= 2005 Arizona Sting season =

2005 Arizona Sting
- League: NLL
- Division: 2nd West
- 2005 record: 9-7
- Home record: 5-3
- Road record: 4-4
- Goals for: 209
- Goals against: 209
- General Manager: Bob Hamley
- Coach: Bob Hamley
- Captain: Peter Lough
- Arena: Jobing.com Arena
- Average attendance: 8,921

Team leaders
- Goals: Dan Dawson (48)
- Assists: Dan Dawson (36)
- Points: Dan Dawson (84)
- Penalties in minutes: Brock Robertson (30)
- Loose Balls: Bruce Codd (97)
- Wins: Mike Miron (5)
- Goals against average: Ken Montour (11.23)

The Arizona Sting are a lacrosse team based in Arizona playing in the National Lacrosse League (NLL). The 2005 season was the 5th in franchise history and 2nd as the Sting (formerly the Columbus Landsharks).

The Sting finished 2nd in the West division with a 9-7 record, and hosted the Colorado Mammoth in the opening round of the playoffs. Arizona defeated Colorado 16-13 to advance to the Western division final against the defending champion Calgary Roughnecks. The Sting defeated Calgary 19-15 in Calgary, advancing to the Championship game in only their second year in Arizona. The Sting faced the Toronto Rock in Toronto for the Championship, and with an NLL record crowd of over 19,400 fans, the Rock defeated the Sting 19-13 to win their fifth championship in seven years.

== Regular season ==
=== Conference standings ===
East Division
P	Team	GP	W	L	PCT	GB	Home	Road	GF	GA	Diff	GF/GP	GA/GP
1	Toronto Rock – xyz	16	12	4	.750	0.0	6–2	6–2	227	190	+37	14.19	11.88
2	Buffalo Bandits – x	16	11	5	.688	1.0	5–3	6–2	217	183	+34	13.56	11.44
3	Rochester Knighthawks – x	16	10	6	.625	2.0	5–3	5–3	193	179	+14	12.06	11.19
4	Philadelphia Wings	16	6	10	.375	6.0	3–5	3–5	213	218	−5	13.31	13.62
5	Minnesota Swarm	16	5	11	.312	7.0	2–6	3–5	188	231	−43	11.75	14.44

West Division
P	Team	GP	W	L	PCT	GB	Home	Road	GF	GA	Diff	GF/GP	GA/GP
1	Calgary Roughnecks – xy	16	10	6	.625	0.0	6–2	4–4	216	208	+8	13.50	13.00
2	Arizona Sting – x	16	9	7	.562	1.0	5–3	4–4	209	209	−-0	13.06	13.06
3	Colorado Mammoth – x	16	8	8	.500	2.0	5–3	3–5	201	182	+19	12.56	11.38
4	Anaheim Storm	16	5	11	.312	5.0	2–6	3–5	175	212	−37	10.94	13.25
5	San Jose Stealth	16	4	12	.250	6.0	2–6	2–6	170	197	−27	10.62	12.31

x: Clinched playoff berth; c: Clinched playoff berth by crossing over to another division; y: Clinched division; z: Clinched best regular season record; GP: Games Played
W: Wins; L: Losses; GB: Games back; PCT: Win percentage; Home: Record at Home; Road: Record on the Road; GF: Goals scored; GA: Goals allowed
Differential: Difference between goals scored and allowed; GF/GP: Average number of goals scored per game; GA/GP: Average number of goals allowed per game

=== Game log ===
Game	Date	Opponent	Location	Score	OT	Attendance	Record
1	January 7, 2005	Philadelphia Wings	Jobing.com Arena	L 9–10	OT	5,903	0–1
2	January 8, 2005	@ Colorado Mammoth	Pepsi Center	W 16–15		17,289	1–1
3	January 15, 2005	@ Rochester Knighthawks	Blue Cross Arena	W 9–8	OT	7,508	2–1
4	January 21, 2005	San Jose Stealth	Jobing.com Arena	L 13–14		6,216	2–2
5	January 22, 2005	@ Calgary Roughnecks	Pengrowth Saddledome	L 14–15		9,886	2–3
6	February 4, 2005	Anaheim Storm	Jobing.com Arena	W 17–10		6,313	3–3
7	February 13, 2005	@ Colorado Mammoth	Pepsi Center	L 12–13	OT	16,238	3–4
8	February 18, 2005	Minnesota Swarm	Jobing.com Arena	W 17–16	OT	6,448	4–4
9	March 11, 2005	San Jose Stealth	Jobing.com Arena	W 13–12	OT	6,614	5–4
10	March 12, 2005	@ San Jose Stealth	HP Pavilion at San Jose	W 12–10		5,069	6–4
11	March 18, 2005	@ Toronto Rock	Air Canada Centre	L 10–18		18,173	6–5
12	March 25, 2005	Calgary Roughnecks	Jobing.com Arena	W 18–16		6,584	7–5
13	April 3, 2005	@ Calgary Roughnecks	Pengrowth Saddledome	L 10–17		10,140	7–6
14	April 9, 2005	Colorado Mammoth	Jobing.com Arena	W 15–12		6,735	8–6
15	April 15, 2005	@ Anaheim Storm	Arrowhead Pond	W 14–12		5,891	9–6
16	April 16, 2005	Anaheim Storm	Jobing.com Arena	L 10–11		7,731	9–7

== Playoffs ==
=== Game log ===
Game	Date	Opponent	Location	Score	OT	Attendance	Record
Division Semifinal	April 22, 2005	Colorado Mammoth	Jobing.com Arena	W 16–13		5,549	1–0
Division Final	April 30, 2005	@ Calgary Roughnecks	Pengrowth Saddledome	W 19–15		11,468	2–0
Championship Game	May 14, 2005	@ Toronto Rock	Air Canada Centre	L 13–19		19,432	2–1

== Player stats ==
=== Runners (Top 10) ===
Note: GP = Games played; G = Goals; A = Assists; Pts = Points; LB = Loose Balls; PIM = Penalty minutes

Player	GP	G	A	Pts	LB	PIM
Dan Dawson	16	48	36	84	73	8
Pat Maddalena	16	31	28	59	71	6
Cory Bomberry	15	24	23	47	23	0
Jonas Derks	11	18	22	40	41	8
Lindsay Plunkett	12	14	22	36	49	14
Peter Veltman	15	13	13	26	57	2
Jason Clark	15	13	9	22	46	8
Gewas Schindler	7	6	16	22	15	6
Scott Self	13	4	15	19	64	16
Totals		253	462	218	1082	52

=== Goaltenders ===
Note: GP = Games played; MIN = Minutes; W = Wins; L = Losses; GA = Goals against; Sv% = Save percentage; GAA = Goals against average

Player	GP	MIN	W	L	GA	Sv%	GAA
Mike Miron	15	765:12	5	7	169	.740	13.25
Ken Montour	7	208:27	4	0	39	.735	11.23
Totals			9	7	209	.738	13.06

== Awards ==
Player	Award
Bob Hamley	Les Bartley Award
Bob Hamley	GM of the Year
Dan Dawson	First Team All-Pro
Dan Dawson	All-Stars
Peter Lough	All-Stars
Scott Self	All-Stars

== Transactions ==
=== Trades ===
February 2, 2005	To Arizona Sting Jonas Derks	To Buffalo Bandits second round pick, 2005 entry draft second round pick, 2007 entry draft
March 9, 2005	To Arizona Sting Chris Seller	To Anaheim Storm Bill Greer
March 24, 2005	To Arizona Sting Craig Conn	To Minnesota Swarm first round pick, 2006 entry draft first round pick, 2007 entry draft
March 24, 2005	To Arizona Sting Chris Panos	To Colorado Mammoth third round pick, 2005 entry draft

== Roster ==
No.		Position	Player
	(Canada)	Fwd	Beirnes, Kasey
72	(Haudenosaunee)	Fwd	Bomberry, Cory
2	(Canada)	Def	Bonterre, Troy
13	(Canada)	Fwd	Clark, Jason
5	(Canada)	Def	Cochrane, Mark
9	(Canada)	Def	Codd, Bruce
8	(Canada)	Fwd	Conn, Craig
6	(Canada)	Fwd	Dawson, Dan
43	(Canada)	Fwd	Derks, Jonas
19	(Canada)	Def	Gibson, Darryl
	(Canada)	Def	Greer, Bill
18	(Canada)	Def	Halls, Darren
	(United States)	Fwd	Henderson, Tony

No.		Position	Player
27	(Canada)	Def	Lough, Peter
36	(United States)	Fwd	Maddalena, Pat
38	(Canada)	Fwd	McKay, Chris
41	(Canada)	Goalie	Miron, Mike
29	(Haudenosaunee)	Goalie	Montour, Ken
	(United States)	Fwd	Panos, Chris
11	(Canada)	Fwd	Plunkett, Lindsay
23	(Canada)	Def	Robertson, Brock
	(United States)	Fwd	Schindler, Gewas
7	(Canada)	Def	Self, Scott
24	(Canada)	Def	Seller, Chris
16	(Canada)	Fwd	Talbot, Noah
4	(Canada)	Fwd	Tinning, Mark
33	(Canada)	Fwd	Veltman, Peter

== See also ==
- 2005 NLL season
