= 2005 Minnesota Swarm season =

2005 Minnesota Swarm
- League: NLL
- Division: 5th East
- 2005 record: 5-11
- Home record: 2-6
- Road record: 3-5
- Goals for: 188
- Goals against: 231
- General Manager: Marty O'Neill
- Coach: Mike Simpson
- Captain: Ryan Cousins
- Arena: Xcel Energy Center
- Average attendance: 9,579

Team leaders
- Goals: Kelly Hall (27)
- Assists: Jamie Taylor (27)
- Points: Kelly Hall (48)
- Penalties in minutes: Ryan Cousins (45); Mike Kilby (45)
- Loose Balls: Riley Kemp (94)
- Wins: Matt Disher (4)
- Goals against average: Matt Disher (14.45)

The Minnesota Swarm are a lacrosse team based in Minnesota playing in the National Lacrosse League (NLL). The 2005 season was the Swarm's inaugural season in the NLL.

The Swarm won the first game in franchise history, 12–11 on New Year's Day in Rochester, and after losing to Toronto and Buffalo, they beat the San Jose Stealth to even their record at 2-2. The Swarm then lost seven in a row, before finally winning their first home game. They finished the season 5-11 and last in the East.

== Regular season ==
=== Conference standings ===
East Division
P	Team	GP	W	L	PCT	GB	Home	Road	GF	GA	Diff	GF/GP	GA/GP
1	Toronto Rock – xyz	16	12	4	.750	0.0	6–2	6–2	227	190	+37	14.19	11.88
2	Buffalo Bandits – x	16	11	5	.688	1.0	5–3	6–2	217	183	+34	13.56	11.44
3	Rochester Knighthawks – x	16	10	6	.625	2.0	5–3	5–3	193	179	+14	12.06	11.19
4	Philadelphia Wings	16	6	10	.375	6.0	3–5	3–5	213	218	−5	13.31	13.62
5	Minnesota Swarm	16	5	11	.312	7.0	2–6	3–5	188	231	−43	11.75	14.44

West Division
P	Team	GP	W	L	PCT	GB	Home	Road	GF	GA	Diff	GF/GP	GA/GP
1	Calgary Roughnecks – xy	16	10	6	.625	0.0	6–2	4–4	216	208	+8	13.50	13.00
2	Arizona Sting – x	16	9	7	.562	1.0	5–3	4–4	209	209	−-0	13.06	13.06
3	Colorado Mammoth – x	16	8	8	.500	2.0	5–3	3–5	201	182	+19	12.56	11.38
4	Anaheim Storm	16	5	11	.312	5.0	2–6	3–5	175	212	−37	10.94	13.25
5	San Jose Stealth	16	4	12	.250	6.0	2–6	2–6	170	197	−27	10.62	12.31

x: Clinched playoff berth; c: Clinched playoff berth by crossing over to another division; y: Clinched division; z: Clinched best regular season record; GP: Games Played
W: Wins; L: Losses; GB: Games back; PCT: Win percentage; Home: Record at Home; Road: Record on the Road; GF: Goals scored; GA: Goals allowed
Differential: Difference between goals scored and allowed; GF/GP: Average number of goals scored per game; GA/GP: Average number of goals allowed per game

=== Game log ===
Game	Date	Opponent	Location	Score	OT	Attendance	Record
1	January 1, 2005	@ Rochester Knighthawks	Blue Cross Arena	W 12–11		8,532	1–0
2	January 15, 2005	@ Toronto Rock	Air Canada Centre	L 15–19		17,229	1–1
3	January 21, 2005	Buffalo Bandits	Xcel Energy Center	L 10–15		13,198	1–2
4	January 22, 2005	@ San Jose Stealth	HP Pavilion at San Jose	W 9–8		5,059	2–2
5	January 28, 2005	Anaheim Storm	Xcel Energy Center	L 7–8		12,514	2–3
6	February 11, 2005	Toronto Rock	Xcel Energy Center	L 9–15		9,109	2–4
7	February 18, 2005	@ Arizona Sting	Jobing.com Arena	L 16–17	OT	6,448	2–5
8	February 20, 2005	Philadelphia Wings	Xcel Energy Center	L 17–18		8,106	2–6
9	March 5, 2005	@ Philadelphia Wings	Wachovia Center	L 8–15		10,846	2–7
10	March 11, 2005	Buffalo Bandits	Xcel Energy Center	L 16–23		8,254	2–8
11	March 18, 2005	@ Buffalo Bandits	HSBC Arena	L 11–13		9,116	2–9
12	March 25, 2005	Rochester Knighthawks	Xcel Energy Center	W 12–11		7,764	3–9
13	March 26, 2005	@ Rochester Knighthawks	Blue Cross Arena	L 11–20		8,557	3–10
14	April 1, 2005	Colorado Mammoth	Xcel Energy Center	L 9–15		10,054	3–11
15	April 9, 2005	@ Anaheim Storm	Arrowhead Pond	W 12–11	OT	4,967	4–11
16	April 15, 2005	Philadelphia Wings	Xcel Energy Center	W 14–12		13,524	5–11

== Player stats ==
=== Runners (Top 10) ===
Note: GP = Games played; G = Goals; A = Assists; Pts = Points; LB = Loose Balls; PIM = Penalty Minutes

Player	GP	G	A	Pts	LB	PIM
Kelly Hall	13	27	21	48	47	34
Ryan Ward	11	19	25	44	53	2
Chad Culp	14	18	23	41	87	17
Ryder Bateman	14	20	19	39	56	20
Jamie Taylor	15	9	27	36	52	17
D'Arcy Berthiaume	13	14	18	32	88	20
Craig Conn	8	14	17	31	78	17
Sean Pollock	13	9	16	25	42	17
Kerry Susheski	14	15	7	22	47	22
Totals		237	425	460	1031	62

=== Goaltenders ===
Note: GP = Games played; MIN = Minutes; W = Wins; L = Losses; GA = Goals against; Sv% = Save percentage; GAA = Goals against average

Player	GP	MIN	W	L	GA	Sv%	GAA
Matt Disher	14	788:46	4	10	190	.729	14.45
Nick Patterson	4	89:13	1	0	23	.729	15.47
John McLellan	2	51:16	0	1	8	.795	9.36
Mike Attwood	3	39:42	0	0	8	.733	12.09
Totals			5	11	231	.731	14.44

== Awards ==
Player	Award
Ryder Bateman	All-Rookie Team
Craig Conn	All-Stars
Ryan Cousins	All-Stars

== Transactions ==
=== Trades ===
February 2, 2005	To Minnesota Swarm second-round pick, 2005 entry draft	To Colorado Mammoth John McLellan
February 12, 2005	To Minnesota Swarm Ryan Ward	To Philadelphia Wings Shawn Nadelen
March 24, 2005	To Minnesota Swarm first-round pick, 2006 entry draft first-round pick, 2007 entry draft	To Arizona Sting Craig Conn

== Roster ==
No.		Position	Player
43		Goalie	Attwood, Mike
14	(Canada)	Fwd	Bateman, Ryder
66	(Canada)	Fwd	Berthiaume, D'Arcy
24	(Canada)	Def	Boyle, Brock
	(Canada)	Fwd	Bryde, Jayme
	(Canada)	Def	Campbell, Scott
	(Canada)	Fwd	Conn, Craig
50	(Canada)	Def	Cousins, Ryan
10	(Canada)	Fwd	Culp, Chad
1	(Canada)	Goalie	Disher, Matt
	(Canada)	Def	Doddridge, Neil
22	(Canada)	Def	Guze, Ray
11	(Canada)	Fwd	Hall, Kelly
	(Canada)	Fwd	Harasym, Jon
37	(United States)	Fwd	Henderson, Tony

No.		Position	Player
47	(United States)	Fwd	Hill, Travis
19	(Canada)	Def	Jenner, Teddy
77	(Canada)	Def	Kemp, Riley
55	(Canada)	Def	Kilby, Mike
15	(Canada)	Def	Martin, Andrew
	(Canada)	Goalie	McLellan, John
	(United States)	Def	Nadelen, Shawn
12	(Canada)	Def	Pacey, Eric
93	(Canada)	Goalie	Patterson, Nick
17	(Canada)	Fwd	Pollock, Sean
	(Canada)	Fwd	Smalley, Trent
23	(Canada)	Def	Sullivan, Jon
33	(Canada)	Fwd	Summerfield, Shawn
84	(Canada)	Fwd	Susheski, Kerry
40	(Canada)	Fwd	Taylor, Jamie
44	(Canada)	Fwd	Ward, Ryan

== See also ==
- 2005 NLL season
