= 2005 Anaheim Storm season =

2005 Anaheim Storm
- League: NLL
- Division: 4th West
- 2005 record: 5–11
- Home record: 2–6
- Road record: 3–5
- Goals for: 175
- Goals against: 212
- General Manager: Derek Keenan
- Coach: Derek Keenan
- Captain: Casey Powell
- Arena: Arrowhead Pond
- Average attendance: 7,697

Team leaders
- Goals: Casey Powell (27)
- Assists: Ryan Powell (31)
- Points: Casey Powell (57)
- Penalties in minutes: Mark Shepherd (105)
- Loose Balls: Bruce Murray (83)
- Wins: Matt Roik (4)
- Goals against average: Matt Roik (12.93)

The Anaheim Storm were a lacrosse team based in Anaheim, California playing in the National Lacrosse League (NLL). The 2005 season was the 4th in franchise history, second in Anaheim (previously the New Jersey Storm), and last before the franchise folded.

The Storm followed up their 1–15 inaugural season in Anaheim by improving to 5–11, and finishing 4th in the West division. The 5–11 record was tied for the best in team history, and was the first time the Storm (whether based in Anaheim or New Jersey) had not finished last in their division. The Storm suspended operations following the 2005 season.

== Regular season ==
=== Conference standings ===
East Division
P	Team	GP	W	L	PCT	GB	Home	Road	GF	GA	Diff	GF/GP	GA/GP
1	Toronto Rock – xyz	16	12	4	.750	0.0	6–2	6–2	227	190	+37	14.19	11.88
2	Buffalo Bandits – x	16	11	5	.688	1.0	5–3	6–2	217	183	+34	13.56	11.44
3	Rochester Knighthawks – x	16	10	6	.625	2.0	5–3	5–3	193	179	+14	12.06	11.19
4	Philadelphia Wings	16	6	10	.375	6.0	3–5	3–5	213	218	−5	13.31	13.62
5	Minnesota Swarm	16	5	11	.312	7.0	2–6	3–5	188	231	−43	11.75	14.44

West Division
P	Team	GP	W	L	PCT	GB	Home	Road	GF	GA	Diff	GF/GP	GA/GP
1	Calgary Roughnecks – xy	16	10	6	.625	0.0	6–2	4–4	216	208	+8	13.50	13.00
2	Arizona Sting – x	16	9	7	.562	1.0	5–3	4–4	209	209	−-0	13.06	13.06
3	Colorado Mammoth – x	16	8	8	.500	2.0	5–3	3–5	201	182	+19	12.56	11.38
4	Anaheim Storm	16	5	11	.312	5.0	2–6	3–5	175	212	−37	10.94	13.25
5	San Jose Stealth	16	4	12	.250	6.0	2–6	2–6	170	197	−27	10.62	12.31

x: Clinched playoff berth; c: Clinched playoff berth by crossing over to another division; y: Clinched division; z: Clinched best regular season record; GP: Games Played
W: Wins; L: Losses; GB: Games back; PCT: Win percentage; Home: Record at Home; Road: Record on the Road; GF: Goals scored; GA: Goals allowed
Differential: Difference between goals scored and allowed; GF/GP: Average number of goals scored per game; GA/GP: Average number of goals allowed per game

=== Game log ===
Game	Date	Opponent	Location	Score	OT	Attendance	Record
1	January 8, 2005	Philadelphia Wings	Arrowhead Pond	W 13–10		5,732	1–0
2	January 22, 2005	Rochester Knighthawks	Arrowhead Pond	L 11–15		4,053	1–1
3	January 28, 2005	@ Minnesota Swarm	Xcel Energy Center	W 8–7		12,514	2–1
4	January 29, 2005	Calgary Roughnecks	Arrowhead Pond	L 12–13		4,159	2–2
5	February 4, 2005	@ Arizona Sting	Jobing.com Arena	L 10–17		6,313	2–3
6	February 11, 2005	@ Buffalo Bandits	HSBC Arena	L 9–20		8,805	2–4
7	February 18, 2005	@ Calgary Roughnecks	Pengrowth Saddledome	L 15–18		9,550	2–5
8	March 4, 2005	Colorado Mammoth	Arrowhead Pond	L 12–13		4,500	2–6
9	March 13, 2005	Toronto Rock	Arrowhead Pond	L 6–14		4,499	2–7
10	March 19, 2005	@ Colorado Mammoth	Pepsi Center	L 8–16		16,270	2–8
11	March 25, 2005	@ San Jose Stealth	HP Pavilion at San Jose	L 14–15		5,022	2–9
12	March 26, 2005	San Jose Stealth	Arrowhead Pond	W 13–12	OT	4,834	3–9
13	April 2, 2005	@ Colorado Mammoth	Pepsi Center	W 10–6		18,326	4–9
14	April 9, 2005	Minnesota Swarm	Arrowhead Pond	L 11–12	OT	4,967	4–10
15	April 15, 2005	Arizona Sting	Arrowhead Pond	L 12–14		5,891	4–11
16	April 16, 2005	@ Arizona Sting	Jobing.com Arena	W 11–10		7,731	5–11

== Player stats ==
=== Runners (Top 10) ===
Note: GP = Games played; G = Goals; A = Assists; Pts = Points; LB = Loose Balls; PIM = Penalty minutes

Player	GP	G	A	Pts	LB	PIM
Casey Powell	14	27	30	57	60	30
Shawn Cable	16	21	27	48	68	13
Mark Shepherd	16	25	22	47	88	105
Ryan Powell	16	15	31	46	76	8
Scott Stewart	16	19	22	41	64	2
Peter Morgan	13	22	15	37	65	4
Richard Morgan	16	18	10	28	62	32
Matt Dwane	16	11	14	25	68	27
B.J. Potter	12	10	12	22	28	29
Chad Wittman	11	8	8	16	48	12
Totals		226	401	349	970	41

=== Goaltenders ===
Note: GP = Games played; MIN = Minutes; W = Wins; L = Losses; GA = Goals against; Sv% = Save percentage; GAA = Goals against average

Player	GP	MIN	W	L	GA	Sv%	GAA
Matt Roik	13	681:58	4	8	147	.725	12.93
Matt King	6	277:13	1	3	62	.699	13.42
Michael McKay	2	8:29	0	0	2	.800	14.15
Totals			5	11	212	.718	13.25

== Awards ==
Player	Award
Rory Glaves	All-Rookie Team
Casey Powell	All-Stars
Mike Law	All-Stars

== Transactions ==
=== Trades ===
March 9, 2005	To Anaheim Storm Bill Greer	To Arizona Sting Chris Seller

== Roster ==
No.		Position	Player
6	(Canada)	Def	Berthiame, DArcy
20	(Canada)	Def	Bysouth, Adam
11	(Canada)	Fwd	Cable, Shawn
21	(United States)	Def	Davis, Damien
7	(Canada)	Def	Dwane, Matt
19	(Canada)	Def	Greer, Bill
12	(Canada)	Def	Jones, Pat
30	(Canada)	Goalie	King, Matt
16	(Canada)	Def	Logeman, Casey
44	(Canada)	Def	McElroy, Chris
27	(Canada)	Goalie	McKay, Michael
43	(Canada)	Def	Melville, Cory

No.		Position	Player
26	(Haudenosaunee)	Fwd	Mitchell, Raweras
12	(Canada)	Fwd	Shepherd, Mark
4	(Canada)	Fwd	Morgan, Peter
33	(United States)	Fwd	Morgan, Richard
10	(Canada)	Def	Murray, Bruce
17	(Canada)	Def	Potter, B.J.
22	(United States)	Fwd	Powell, Casey
1	(United States)	Fwd	Powell, Ryan
37	(Canada)	Goalie	Roik, Matt
	(Canada)	Def	Seller, Chris
8	(Canada)	Fwd	Stewart, Scott
2	(United States)	Fwd	Vallone, Steve
14	(United States)	Def	Wittman, Chad
	(Canada)	Fwd	Yuen, Athen

== See also ==
- 2005 NLL season
