= 2005 Rochester Knighthawks season =

NLL team season

2005 Rochester Knighthawks
- League: NLL
- Division: 3rd East
- 2005 record: 10-6
- Home record: 5-3
- Road record: 5-3
- Goals for: 193
- Goals against: 179
- General Manager: Paul Day
- Coach: Paul Day
- Captain: Mike Hasen
- Alternate captains: Shawn Williams; John Grant, Jr.
- Arena: Blue Cross Arena
- Average attendance: 9,711

Team leaders
- Goals: John Grant, Jr. (49)
- Assists: John Grant, Jr. (56)
- Points: John Grant, Jr. (105)
- Penalties in minutes: Casey Zapf (58)
- Loose Balls: Mike Hasen (91)
- Wins: Pat O'Toole (9)
- Goals against average: Pat O'Toole (11.10)

The Rochester Knighthawks were a lacrosse team based in Rochester, New York that played in the National Lacrosse League (NLL). The 2005 season was the 11th in franchise history.

== Regular season ==
=== Conference standings ===
East Division
P	Team	GP	W	L	PCT	GB	Home	Road	GF	GA	Diff	GF/GP	GA/GP
1	Toronto Rock – xyz	16	12	4	.750	0.0	6–2	6–2	227	190	+37	14.19	11.88
2	Buffalo Bandits – x	16	11	5	.688	1.0	5–3	6–2	217	183	+34	13.56	11.44
3	Rochester Knighthawks – x	16	10	6	.625	2.0	5–3	5–3	193	179	+14	12.06	11.19
4	Philadelphia Wings	16	6	10	.375	6.0	3–5	3–5	213	218	−5	13.31	13.62
5	Minnesota Swarm	16	5	11	.312	7.0	2–6	3–5	188	231	−43	11.75	14.44

West Division
P	Team	GP	W	L	PCT	GB	Home	Road	GF	GA	Diff	GF/GP	GA/GP
1	Calgary Roughnecks – xy	16	10	6	.625	0.0	6–2	4–4	216	208	+8	13.50	13.00
2	Arizona Sting – x	16	9	7	.562	1.0	5–3	4–4	209	209	−-0	13.06	13.06
3	Colorado Mammoth – x	16	8	8	.500	2.0	5–3	3–5	201	182	+19	12.56	11.38
4	Anaheim Storm	16	5	11	.312	5.0	2–6	3–5	175	212	−37	10.94	13.25
5	San Jose Stealth	16	4	12	.250	6.0	2–6	2–6	170	197	−27	10.62	12.31

x: Clinched playoff berth; c: Clinched playoff berth by crossing over to another division; y: Clinched division; z: Clinched best regular season record; GP: Games Played
W: Wins; L: Losses; GB: Games back; PCT: Win percentage; Home: Record at Home; Road: Record on the Road; GF: Goals scored; GA: Goals allowed
Differential: Difference between goals scored and allowed; GF/GP: Average number of goals scored per game; GA/GP: Average number of goals allowed per game

=== Game log ===
Game	Date	Opponent	Location	Score	OT	Attendance	Record
1	January 1, 2005	Minnesota Swarm	Blue Cross Arena	L 11–12		8,532	0–1
2	January 15, 2005	Arizona Sting	Blue Cross Arena	L 8–9	OT	7,508	0–2
3	January 22, 2005	@ Anaheim Storm	Arrowhead Pond	W 15–11		4,053	1–2
4	January 28, 2005	@ Toronto Rock	Air Canada Centre	W 15–6		16,087	2–2
5	January 29, 2005	Toronto Rock	Blue Cross Arena	W 12–11	OT	8,867	3–2
6	February 12, 2005	Philadelphia Wings	Blue Cross Arena	W 16–15		8,061	4–2
7	February 18, 2005	@ Philadelphia Wings	Wachovia Center	W 14–13	OT	12,311	5–2
8	February 19, 2005	Buffalo Bandits	Blue Cross Arena	L 7–11		9,961	5–3
9	February 25, 2005	@ Toronto Rock	Air Canada Centre	L 9–15		16,372	5–4
10	March 12, 2005	@ Philadelphia Wings	Wachovia Center	W 13–12		12,731	6–4
11	March 19, 2005	Buffalo Bandits	Blue Cross Arena	W 12–11	OT	10,102	7–4
12	March 25, 2005	@ Minnesota Swarm	Xcel Energy Center	L 11–12		7,764	7–5
13	March 26, 2005	Minnesota Swarm	Blue Cross Arena	W 20–11		8,557	8–5
14	April 1, 2005	@ Buffalo Bandits	HSBC Arena	L 9–11		10,014	8–6
15	April 8, 2005	@ San Jose Stealth	HP Pavilion at San Jose	W 8–7		5,120	9–6
16	April 15, 2005	Colorado Mammoth	Blue Cross Arena	W 13–12		9,342	10–6

== Playoffs ==
=== Game log ===
Game	Date	Opponent	Location	Score	OT	Attendance	Record
Division Semifinal	April 23, 2005	@ Buffalo Bandits	HSBC Arena	W 19–14		10,014	1–0
Division Final	April 29, 2005	@ Toronto Rock	Air Canada Centre	L 10–12		17,289	1–1

== Player stats ==
=== Runners (Top 10) ===
Note: GP = Games played; G = Goals; A = Assists; Pts = Points; LB = Loose Balls; PIM = Penalty minutes

Player	GP	G	A	Pts	LB	PIM
John Grant, Jr.	15	49	56	105	83	31
Shawn Williams	16	33	50	83	74	12
Mike Accursi	16	23	48	71	74	12
Scott Evans	16	29	23	52	59	25
Ryan O'Connor	14	14	17	31	19	6
Ken Millin	16	8	18	26	45	6
Mat Giles	15	10	13	23	44	18
Andrew Turner	16	0	13	13	80	28
Steve Toll	5	5	5	10	33	0
Totals		294	487	377	1055	50

=== Goaltenders ===
Note: GP = Games played; MIN = Minutes; W = Wins; L = Losses; GA = Goals against; Sv% = Save percentage; GAA = Goals against average

Player	GP	MIN	W	L	GA	Sv%	GAA
Pat O'Toole	16	907:59	9	6	168	.775	11.10
Pat Campbell	4	53:02	1	0	8	.822	9.05
Totals			10	6	179	.775	11.19

== Awards ==
Player	Award
Andrew Turner	Defensive Player of the Year
John Grant, Jr.	First Team All-Pro
John Grant, Jr.	Player of the Month, February

== Transactions ==
=== Trades ===
March 24, 2005	To Rochester Knighthawks Steve Toll	To San Jose Stealth first round pick, 2005 entry draft second round pick, 2005 entry draft

== Roster ==
No.		Position	Player
43	(United States)	Def	Abrams, Marshall
44	(Canada)	Fwd	Accursi, Mike
37	(Canada)	Goalie	Campbell, Pat
42	(United States)	Def	Cougevan, Pat
12	(Canada)	Fwd	Croswell, Brian
7	(United States)	Fwd	Dutton, Pat
19	(Canada)	Fwd	Evans, Scott
15	(Canada)	Fwd	Giles, Mat
24	(Canada)	Fwd	Grant, John
10	(Canada)	Def	Hasen, Mike
23	(Canada)	Def	Hoar, Stephen
	(United States)	Fwd	Juleff, Dennis

No.		Position	Player
4	(Canada)	Def	Livingstone, Carter
32	(Canada)	Fwd	Millin, Ken
14	(Canada)	Fwd	O'Connor, Ryan
39	(Canada)	Goalie	O'Toole, Pat
20	(Canada)	Def	Penny, Steve
2	(United States)	Def	Schiller, Chris
33	(United States)	Fwd	Soudan, Tim
11	(United States)	Def	Thorpe, Regy
17	(Canada)	Def	Toll, Steve
26	(Canada)	Def	Turner, Andrew
51	(Canada)	Fwd	Williams, Shawn
27	(Canada)	Fwd	Zaph, Casey

== See also ==
- 2005 NLL season
