= 2005 Toronto Rock season =

2005 Toronto Rock
- Champion's Cup Champions
- East Division Champions
- League: NLL
- Division: 1st East
- 2005 record: 12-4
- Home record: 6-2
- Road record: 6-2
- Goals for: 227
- Goals against: 190
- General Manager: Terry Sanderson
- Coach: Terry Sanderson
- Captain: Jim Veltman
- Alternate captains: Colin Doyle; Chris Driscoll
- Arena: Air Canada Centre
- Average attendance: 17,123

Team leaders
- Goals: Colin Doyle (42)
- Assists: Josh Sanderson (71)
- Points: Colin Doyle (111)
- Penalties in minutes: Chris Driscoll (33)
- Loose Balls: Jim Veltman (193)
- Wins: Bob Watson (11)
- Goals against average: Bob Watson (11.78)

The Toronto Rock are a lacrosse team based in Toronto playing in the National Lacrosse League (NLL). The 2005 season was the 8th in franchise history and 7th as the Rock.

The Rock continued its dynasty on top of the NLL standings, finishing first in its division for the seventh straight year. The Rock beat the Rochester Knighthawks in the division final and then hosted the Arizona Sting in the championship game. In a decisive win, the Rock beat the Sting 19-13 for their fifth Champion's Cup in seven years, and first without Les Bartley behind the bench.

== Regular season ==
=== Conference standings ===
East Division
P	Team	GP	W	L	PCT	GB	Home	Road	GF	GA	Diff	GF/GP	GA/GP
1	Toronto Rock – xyz	16	12	4	.750	0.0	6–2	6–2	227	190	+37	14.19	11.88
2	Buffalo Bandits – x	16	11	5	.688	1.0	5–3	6–2	217	183	+34	13.56	11.44
3	Rochester Knighthawks – x	16	10	6	.625	2.0	5–3	5–3	193	179	+14	12.06	11.19
4	Philadelphia Wings	16	6	10	.375	6.0	3–5	3–5	213	218	−5	13.31	13.62
5	Minnesota Swarm	16	5	11	.312	7.0	2–6	3–5	188	231	−43	11.75	14.44

West Division
P	Team	GP	W	L	PCT	GB	Home	Road	GF	GA	Diff	GF/GP	GA/GP
1	Calgary Roughnecks – xy	16	10	6	.625	0.0	6–2	4–4	216	208	+8	13.50	13.00
2	Arizona Sting – x	16	9	7	.562	1.0	5–3	4–4	209	209	−-0	13.06	13.06
3	Colorado Mammoth – x	16	8	8	.500	2.0	5–3	3–5	201	182	+19	12.56	11.38
4	Anaheim Storm	16	5	11	.312	5.0	2–6	3–5	175	212	−37	10.94	13.25
5	San Jose Stealth	16	4	12	.250	6.0	2–6	2–6	170	197	−27	10.62	12.31

x: Clinched playoff berth; c: Clinched playoff berth by crossing over to another division; y: Clinched division; z: Clinched best regular season record; GP: Games Played
W: Wins; L: Losses; GB: Games back; PCT: Win percentage; Home: Record at Home; Road: Record on the Road; GF: Goals scored; GA: Goals allowed
Differential: Difference between goals scored and allowed; GF/GP: Average number of goals scored per game; GA/GP: Average number of goals allowed per game

=== Game log ===
Game	Date	Opponent	Location	Score	OT	Attendance	Record
1	January 7, 2005	@ Buffalo Bandits	HSBC Arena	W 15–13		11,067	1–0
2	January 15, 2005	Minnesota Swarm	Air Canada Centre	W 19–15		17,229	2–0
3	January 28, 2005	Rochester Knighthawks	Air Canada Centre	L 6–15		16,087	2–1
4	January 29, 2005	@ Rochester Knighthawks	Blue Cross Arena	L 11–12	OT	8,867	2–2
5	February 11, 2005	@ Minnesota Swarm	Xcel Energy Center	W 15–9		9,109	3–2
6	February 12, 2005	Calgary Roughnecks	Air Canada Centre	W 16–10		17,240	4–2
7	February 25, 2005	Rochester Knighthawks	Air Canada Centre	W 15–9		16,372	5–2
8	March 4, 2005	Buffalo Bandits	Air Canada Centre	L 12–14		17,756	5–3
9	March 13, 2005	@ Anaheim Storm	Arrowhead Pond	W 14–6		4,499	6–3
10	March 18, 2005	Arizona Sting	Air Canada Centre	W 18–10		18,173	7–3
11	March 25, 2005	@ Buffalo Bandits	HSBC Arena	W 12–8		11,309	8–3
12	April 1, 2005	Calgary Roughnecks	Air Canada Centre	W 16–10		17,141	9–3
13	April 2, 2005	@ Philadelphia Wings	Wachovia Center	W 17–15		12,584	10–3
14	April 9, 2005	@ Philadelphia Wings	Wachovia Center	W 15–11		14,480	11–3
15	April 10, 2005	Philadelphia Wings	Air Canada Centre	W 14–13		16,989	12–3
16	April 17, 2005	@ Calgary Roughnecks	Pengrowth Saddledome	L 12–20		11,311	12–4

== Playoffs ==
=== Game log ===
Game	Date	Opponent	Location	Score	OT	Attendance	Record
Division Final	April 29, 2005	Rochester Knighthawks	Air Canada Centre	W 12–10		17,289	1–0
Championship Game	May 14, 2005	Arizona Sting	Air Canada Centre	W 19–13		19,432	2–0

== Player stats ==
=== Runners (Top 10) ===
Note: GP = Games played; G = Goals; A = Assists; Pts = Points; LB = Loose Balls; PIM = Penalty minutes

Player	GP	G	A	Pts	LB	PIM
Colin Doyle	16	42	69	111	94	21
Blaine Manning	16	39	66	105	83	18
Josh Sanderson	16	31	71	102	112	8
Aaron Wilson	16	41	33	74	99	6
Matt Shearer	13	17	21	38	39	0
Jim Veltman	13	8	28	36	193	29
Chris Driscoll	16	13	13	26	91	33
Rusty Kruger	10	9	13	22	37	20
Brian Beisel	15	7	8	15	62	6
Totals		380	607	424	1118	61

=== Goaltenders ===
Note: GP = Games played; MIN = Minutes; W = Wins; L = Losses; GA = Goals against; Sv% = Save percentage; GAA = Goals against average

Player	GP	MIN	W	L	GA	Sv%	GAA
Bob Watson	16	886:27	11	4	174	.757	11.78
Phil Wetherup	5	70:40	1	0	15	.722	12.74
Totals			12	4	190	.754	11.88

== Awards ==
Player	Award
Colin Doyle	NLL Most Valuable Player
Bob Watson	Player of the Month, March (tied with John Tavares)
Colin Doyle	Championship Game MVP
Colin Doyle	First All-Pro Team
Blaine Manning	Second All-Pro Team
Josh Sanderson	Second All-Pro Team
Jim Veltman	Second All-Pro Team
Bob Watson	Second All-Pro Team
Blaine Manning	All-Stars
Glenn Clark	All-Stars
Colin Doyle	All-Stars
Jim Veltman	All-Stars

== Roster ==
No.		Position	Player
17	(Canada)	Def	Brian Beisel
5	(Canada)	Fwd	Sandy Chapman
11	(Canada)	Def	Glenn Clark
7	(Canada)	Fwd	Colin Doyle
93	(Canada)	Fwd	Chris Driscoll
36	(Canada)	Def	Luke Forget
20	(Canada)	Fwd	Rusty Kruger
6	(Canada)	Def	Dan Ladouceur
16	(Canada)	Fwd	Blaine Manning
9	(Canada)	Def	Patrick Merrill
77	(Canada)	Def	Tim OBrien

No.		Position	Player
81	(Canada)	Fwd	Jimmy Quinlan
13	(United States)	Def	John Rosa
40	(Canada)	Def	Ian Rubel
19	(Canada)	Fwd	Josh Sanderson
18	(Canada)	Def	Phil Sanderson
24	(Canada)	Fwd	Matt Shearer
27	(Canada)	Def	Derek Suddons
38	(Canada)	Fwd	Nick Trudeau
32	(Canada)	Fwd	Jim Veltman
29	(Canada)	Goalie	Bob Watson
90	(Canada)	Goalie	Phil Wetherup
10	(Canada)	Fwd	Aaron Wilson

== See also ==
- 2005 NLL season
