= 2005 Philadelphia Wings season =

2005 Philadelphia Wings
- League: NLL
- Division: 4th East
- 2005 record: 6–10
- Home record: 3–5
- Road record: 3–5
- Goals for: 213
- Goals against: 218
- General Manager: Lindsay Sanderson
- Coach: Lindsay Sanderson
- Captain: Thomas Hajek
- Arena: Wachovia Center
- Average attendance: 10,733

Team leaders
- Goals: Tom Marechek (40)
- Assists: Dan Marohl (57)
- Points: Tom Marechek (80); Dan Marohl (80)
- Penalties in minutes: Thomas Hajek (50)
- Loose Balls: Peter Jacobs (180)
- Wins: Dallas Eliuk (5)
- Goals against average: Dallas Eliuk (12.76)

The Philadelphia Wings are a lacrosse team based in Philadelphia playing in the National Lacrosse League (NLL). The 2005 season was the 19th in franchise history.

== Regular season ==
=== Conference standings ===
East Division
P	Team	GP	W	L	PCT	GB	Home	Road	GF	GA	Diff	GF/GP	GA/GP
1	Toronto Rock – xyz	16	12	4	.750	0.0	6–2	6–2	227	190	+37	14.19	11.88
2	Buffalo Bandits – x	16	11	5	.688	1.0	5–3	6–2	217	183	+34	13.56	11.44
3	Rochester Knighthawks – x	16	10	6	.625	2.0	5–3	5–3	193	179	+14	12.06	11.19
4	Philadelphia Wings	16	6	10	.375	6.0	3–5	3–5	213	218	−5	13.31	13.62
5	Minnesota Swarm	16	5	11	.312	7.0	2–6	3–5	188	231	−43	11.75	14.44

West Division
P	Team	GP	W	L	PCT	GB	Home	Road	GF	GA	Diff	GF/GP	GA/GP
1	Calgary Roughnecks – xy	16	10	6	.625	0.0	6–2	4–4	216	208	+8	13.50	13.00
2	Arizona Sting – x	16	9	7	.562	1.0	5–3	4–4	209	209	−-0	13.06	13.06
3	Colorado Mammoth – x	16	8	8	.500	2.0	5–3	3–5	201	182	+19	12.56	11.38
4	Anaheim Storm	16	5	11	.312	5.0	2–6	3–5	175	212	−37	10.94	13.25
5	San Jose Stealth	16	4	12	.250	6.0	2–6	2–6	170	197	−27	10.62	12.31

x: Clinched playoff berth; c: Clinched playoff berth by crossing over to another division; y: Clinched division; z: Clinched best regular season record; GP: Games Played
W: Wins; L: Losses; GB: Games back; PCT: Win percentage; Home: Record at Home; Road: Record on the Road; GF: Goals scored; GA: Goals allowed
Differential: Difference between goals scored and allowed; GF/GP: Average number of goals scored per game; GA/GP: Average number of goals allowed per game

=== Game log ===
Game	Date	Opponent	Location	Score	OT	Attendance	Record
1	January 7, 2005	@ Arizona Sting	Jobing.com Arena	W 10–9	OT	5,903	1–0
2	January 8, 2005	@ Anaheim Storm	Arrowhead Pond	L 10–13		5,732	1–1
3	January 28, 2005	Buffalo Bandits	Wachovia Center	L 10–15		8,849	1–2
4	January 29, 2005	@ Buffalo Bandits	HSBC Arena	L 16–20		10,945	1–3
5	February 5, 2005	San Jose Stealth	Wachovia Center	W 14–13		10,025	2–3
6	February 12, 2005	@ Rochester Knighthawks	Blue Cross Arena	L 15–16		8,061	2–4
7	February 18, 2005	Rochester Knighthawks	Wachovia Center	L 13–14	OT	12,311	2–5
8	February 20, 2005	@ Minnesota Swarm	Xcel Energy Center	W 18–17		8,106	3–5
9	February 25, 2005	@ Buffalo Bandits	HSBC Arena	W 14–8		8,912	4–5
10	March 5, 2005	Minnesota Swarm	Wachovia Center	W 15–8		10,846	5–5
11	March 12, 2005	Rochester Knighthawks	Wachovia Center	L 12–13		12,731	5–6
12	March 18, 2005	Colorado Mammoth	Wachovia Center	W 15–12		11,742	6–6
13	April 2, 2005	Toronto Rock	Wachovia Center	L 15–17		12,584	6–7
14	April 9, 2005	Toronto Rock	Wachovia Center	L 11–15		14,480	6–8
15	April 10, 2005	@ Toronto Rock	Air Canada Centre	L 13–14		16,989	6–9
16	April 15, 2005	@ Minnesota Swarm	Xcel Energy Center	L 12–14		13,524	6–10

== Player stats ==
=== Runners (Top 10) ===
Note: GP = Games played; G = Goals; A = Assists; Pts = Points; LB = Loose Balls; PIM = Penalty minutes

Player	GP	G	A	Pts	LB	PIM
Tom Marechek	16	40	40	80	69	12
Dan Marohl	16	23	57	80	71	0
Jeff Ratcliffe	16	39	31	70	57	18
Keith Cromwell	16	24	43	67	57	9
Marc Morley	16	20	22	42	69	23
Jake Bergey	15	16	25	41	46	8
Andrew Burkholder	11	17	14	31	83	10
Jeff Spano	13	5	13	18	88	22
Dan Finck	14	10	6	16	82	8
Totals		324	537	357	1104	55

=== Goaltenders ===
Note: GP = Games played; MIN = Minutes; W = Wins; L = Losses; GA = Goals against; Sv% = Save percentage; GAA = Goals against average

Player	GP	MIN	W	L	GA	Sv%	GAA
Dallas Eliuk	13	662:49	5	4	141	.761	12.76
Nick Schroeder	11	294:19	1	6	76	.667	15.49
Totals			6	10	218	.734	13.63

== Awards ==
Player	Award
Andrew Burkholder	All-Rookie Team
Dan Finck	All-Rookie Team
Andrew Burkholder	Rookie of the Month, February
Dallas Eliuk	All-Stars
Thomas Hajek	All-Stars
Tom Marechek	All-Stars

== Transactions ==
=== Trades ===
February 12, 2005	To Philadelphia Wings Shawn Nadelen	To Minnesota Swarm Ryan Ward

== Roster ==
No.		Position	Player
41	(United States)	Def	Barrett, Bryan
25	(United States)	Fwd	Bendig, Bryan
66	(United States)	Fwd	Bergey, Jake
	(United States)	Def	Brzeski, Rich
37	(Canada)	Fwd	Burkholder, Andrew
		?	Cole, Bryan
21	(United States)	Fwd	Cromwell, Keith
35	(Canada)	Goalie	Eliuk, Dallas
22	(United States)	Def	Finck, Dan
4	(United States)	Fwd	Frye, Mark
12	(United States)	Def	Galbraith, Keevin
14	(Canada)	Def	Guindon, Andrew
	(Canada)	Def	Guindon, Jordan

No.		Position	Player
28	(United States)	Def	Hajek, Thomas
24	(United States)	Def	Jacobs, Peter
42	(United States)	Fwd	Marechek, Tom
27	(United States)	Fwd	Marohl, Dan
17	(United States)	Fwd	Morley, Marc
34	(United States)	Def	Nadelen, Shawn
9		Fwd	Pape, Mike
90	(United States)	Fwd	Ratcliffe, Jeff
30	(Canada)	Goalie	Schroeder, Nick
47	(United States)	Def	Spano, Jeff
7	(United States)	Def	Sweeney, Kyle
	(Canada)	Fwd	Van Beek, Rob
	(Canada)	Fwd	Ward, Ryan
10	(United States)	Fwd	Wasik, Andrew

== See also ==
- 2005 NLL season
