= 2005 Calgary Roughnecks season =

2005 Calgary Roughnecks
- West Division Champions
- League: NLL
- Division: 1st West
- 2005 record: 10-6
- Home record: 6-2
- Road record: 4-4
- Goals for: 216
- Goals against: 208
- General Manager: Kurt Silcott
- Coach: Chris Hall
- Captain: Tracey Kelusky
- Arena: Pengrowth Saddledome
- Average attendance: 10,822

Team leaders
- Goals: Tracey Kelusky (45)
- Assists: Lewis Ratcliff (50)
- Points: Lewis Ratcliff (86)
- Penalties in minutes: Jesse Phillips (69)
- Loose Balls: Jesse Phillips (99)
- Wins: Curtis Palidwor (7)
- Goals against average: Andrew Leyshon (9.89)

The Calgary Roughnecks are a lacrosse team based in Calgary playing in the National Lacrosse League (NLL). The 2005 season was the 4th in franchise history.

The Roughnecks followed up their Championship season by finishing first in the west in 2005. However, they were not as successful in the playoffs, losing to the Arizona Sting in the division final.

== Regular season ==
=== Conference standings ===
East Division
| P | Team | GP | W | L | PCT | GB | Home | Road | GF | GA | Diff | GF/GP | GA/GP |
|---|---|---|---|---|---|---|---|---|---|---|---|---|---|
| 1 | Toronto Rock – xyz | 16 | 12 | 4 | .750 | 0.0 | 6–2 | 6–2 | 227 | 190 | +37 | 14.19 | 11.88 |
| 2 | Buffalo Bandits – x | 16 | 11 | 5 | .688 | 1.0 | 5–3 | 6–2 | 217 | 183 | +34 | 13.56 | 11.44 |
| 3 | Rochester Knighthawks – x | 16 | 10 | 6 | .625 | 2.0 | 5–3 | 5–3 | 193 | 179 | +14 | 12.06 | 11.19 |
| 4 | Philadelphia Wings | 16 | 6 | 10 | .375 | 6.0 | 3–5 | 3–5 | 213 | 218 | −5 | 13.31 | 13.62 |
| 5 | Minnesota Swarm | 16 | 5 | 11 | .312 | 7.0 | 2–6 | 3–5 | 188 | 231 | −43 | 11.75 | 14.44 |

West Division
| P | Team | GP | W | L | PCT | GB | Home | Road | GF | GA | Diff | GF/GP | GA/GP |
|---|---|---|---|---|---|---|---|---|---|---|---|---|---|
| 1 | Calgary Roughnecks – xy | 16 | 10 | 6 | .625 | 0.0 | 6–2 | 4–4 | 216 | 208 | +8 | 13.50 | 13.00 |
| 2 | Arizona Sting – x | 16 | 9 | 7 | .562 | 1.0 | 5–3 | 4–4 | 209 | 209 | −-0 | 13.06 | 13.06 |
| 3 | Colorado Mammoth – x | 16 | 8 | 8 | .500 | 2.0 | 5–3 | 3–5 | 201 | 182 | +19 | 12.56 | 11.38 |
| 4 | Anaheim Storm | 16 | 5 | 11 | .312 | 5.0 | 2–6 | 3–5 | 175 | 212 | −37 | 10.94 | 13.25 |
| 5 | San Jose Stealth | 16 | 4 | 12 | .250 | 6.0 | 2–6 | 2–6 | 170 | 197 | −27 | 10.62 | 12.31 |

x: Clinched playoff berth; c: Clinched playoff berth by crossing over to another division; y: Clinched division; z: Clinched best regular season record; GP: Games Played
W: Wins; L: Losses; GB: Games back; PCT: Win percentage; Home: Record at Home; Road: Record on the Road; GF: Goals scored; GA: Goals allowed
Differential: Difference between goals scored and allowed; GF/GP: Average number of goals scored per game; GA/GP: Average number of goals allowed per game

=== Game log ===
| Game | Date | Opponent | Location | Score | OT | Attendance | Record |
|---|---|---|---|---|---|---|---|
| 1 | January 1, 2005 | @ Colorado Mammoth | Pepsi Center | L 7–12 | | 16,397 | 0–1 |
| 2 | January 7, 2005 | San Jose Stealth | Pengrowth Saddledome | L 10–12 | | 10,042 | 0–2 |
| 3 | January 8, 2005 | @ San Jose Stealth | HP Pavilion at San Jose | W 14–10 | | 7,028 | 1–2 |
| 4 | January 22, 2005 | Arizona Sting | Pengrowth Saddledome | W 15–14 | | 9,886 | 2–2 |
| 5 | January 29, 2005 | @ Anaheim Storm | Arrowhead Pond | W 13–12 | | 4,159 | 3–2 |
| 6 | February 4, 2005 | Colorado Mammoth | Pengrowth Saddledome | W 18–16 | | 10,031 | 4–2 |
| 7 | February 12, 2005 | @ Toronto Rock | Air Canada Centre | L 10–16 | | 17,240 | 4–3 |
| 8 | February 18, 2005 | Anaheim Storm | Pengrowth Saddledome | W 18–15 | | 9,550 | 5–3 |
| 9 | March 13, 2005 | @ Colorado Mammoth | Pepsi Center | W 13–10 | | 17,380 | 6–3 |
| 10 | March 18, 2005 | San Jose Stealth | Pengrowth Saddledome | W 15–11 | | 10,517 | 7–3 |
| 11 | March 19, 2005 | @ San Jose Stealth | HP Pavilion at San Jose | W 11–10 | | 5,564 | 8–3 |
| 12 | March 25, 2005 | @ Arizona Sting | Jobing.com Arena | L 16–18 | | 6,584 | 8–4 |
| 13 | April 1, 2005 | @ Toronto Rock | Air Canada Centre | L 10–16 | | 17,141 | 8–5 |
| 14 | April 3, 2005 | Arizona Sting | Pengrowth Saddledome | W 17–10 | | 10,140 | 9–5 |
| 15 | April 9, 2005 | Buffalo Bandits | Pengrowth Saddledome | L 9–14 | | 10,183 | 9–6 |
| 16 | April 17, 2005 | Toronto Rock | Pengrowth Saddledome | W 20–12 | | 11,311 | 10–6 |

== Playoffs ==
=== Game log ===
| Game | Date | Opponent | Location | Score | OT | Attendance | Record |
|---|---|---|---|---|---|---|---|
| Division Final | April 30, 2005 | Arizona Sting | Pengrowth Saddledome | L 15–19 | | 11,468 | 0–1 |

== Player stats ==
=== Runners (Top 10) ===
Note: GP = Games played; G = Goals; A = Assists; Pts = Points; LB = Loose Balls; PIM = Penalty minutes

| Player | GP | G | A | Pts | LB | PIM |
|---|---|---|---|---|---|---|
| Lewis Ratcliff | 16 | 36 | 50 | 86 | 69 | 10 |
| Tracey Kelusky | 16 | 45 | 32 | 77 | 77 | 12 |
| Kaleb Toth | 16 | 38 | 34 | 72 | 93 | 14 |
| Kyle Goundrey | 16 | 11 | 29 | 40 | 52 | 24 |
| Jason Wulder | 14 | 15 | 19 | 34 | 37 | 9 |
| Jesse Phillips | 14 | 11 | 14 | 25 | 99 | 69 |
| Andrew Biers | 14 | 9 | 16 | 25 | 68 | 12 |
| Ted Dowling | 5 | 11 | 9 | 20 | 21 | 6 |
| Taylor Wray | 11 | 2 | 13 | 15 | 90 | 26 |
| Totals | | 304 | 520 | 445 | 1044 | 50 |

=== Goaltenders ===
Note: GP = Games played; MIN = Minutes; W = Wins; L = Losses; GA = Goals against; Sv% = Save percentage; GAA = Goals against average

| Player | GP | MIN | W | L | GA | Sv% | GAA |
|---|---|---|---|---|---|---|---|
| Curtis Palidwor | 16 | 848:57 | 7 | 6 | 189 | .748 | 13.36 |
| Andrew Leyshon | 9 | 109:10 | 3 | 0 | 18 | .780 | 9.89 |
| Totals | | | 10 | 6 | 208 | .750 | 13.00 |

== Awards ==
| Player | Award |
|---|---|
| Tracey Kelusky | Second Team All-Pro |
| Tracey Kelusky | All-Stars |
| Craig Gelsvik | All-Stars |
| Jesse Phillips | All-Stars |
| Lewis Ratcliff | All-Stars |
| Kaleb Toth | All-Stars |

== Transactions ==
=== Trades ===
| March 24, 2005 | To Calgary Roughnecks Ted Dowling third round pick, 2006 entry draft | To San Jose Stealth conditional pick, 2005 entry draft |

== Roster ==
| No. | | Position | Player |
|---|---|---|---|
| 12 | (Canada) | Fwd | Biers, Andrew |
| 88 | (Canada) | Def | Catton, Rich |
| 15 | (Canada) | Fwd | Dostie, Kevin |
| 16 | (Canada) | Fwd | Dowling, Ted |
| 26 | (Canada) | Def | Gelsvik, Craig |
| | (Canada) | Fwd | Gill, Chris |
| | (Canada) | Def | Gillespie, Travis |
| 19 | (Canada) | Fwd | Goundrey, Kyle |
| 18 | (Canada) | Fwd | Howard, Kevin |
| 17 | (Canada) | Fwd | Kelusky, Tracey |
| 41 | (Canada) | Goalie | Leyshon, Andrew |
| 28 | (Canada) | Def | MacDonald, Brad |
| 37 | (Canada) | Def | McBride, Andrew |
| | (Canada) | Def | McNish, Ryan |

| No. | | Position | Player |
|---|---|---|---|
| 14 | (Canada) | Def | Moleski, Jeff |
| | | ? | Neufeld, Kyle |
| | (Canada) | Def | Ogilvie, Andy |
| | (Canada) | Def | Olson, John |
| 0 | (Canada) | Goalie | Palidwor, Curtis |
| 74 | (Canada) | Def | Phillips, Jesse |
| 42 | (Canada) | Fwd | Ratcliff, Lewis |
| 76 | (Canada) | Def | Sharp, Ryan |
| 25 | (Canada) | ? | Sundher, Jordan |
| 9 | (Canada) | Fwd | Toth, Kaleb |
| 72 | (Canada) | Def | Williams, Rob |
| | (Canada) | Def | Wray, Devan |
| 44 | (Canada) | Def | Wray, Taylor |
| 22 | (Canada) | Fwd | Wulder, Jason |

== See also ==
- 2005 NLL season
