= Marc Morley =

American lacrosse player

Personal information
- Nickname: "Magic Morley" "The Punisher"
- Nationality: American
- Born: November 1, 1979 (age 46) Canton, New York, U.S.
- Height: 5 ft 10 in (178 cm)
- Weight: 190 lb (86 kg; 13 st 8 lb)

Sport
- Position: Forward
- Shoots: Left
- NLL teams: Philadelphia Wings; New Jersey Storm; Anaheim Storm
- MLL team: Philadelphia Barrage
- OLA team: St. Regis Indians
- Pro career: 2003–

Marc Morley (born November 1, 1979) is from Canton, New York is a lacrosse player for the Philadelphia Barrage in the Major League Lacrosse, and formerly of the Philadelphia Wings, New Jersey Storm, and Anaheim Storm in the National Lacrosse League.

Morley attended the University of Massachusetts Amherst where he was honored as an All-American Player in 2002.

Morley has been named to Team USA in the 2007 World Indoor Lacrosse Championships.

Morley is married to his wife, Meg. They have 4 children, Ireland, Mick, Benji, and Ella. Morley currently coaches his daughter's lacrosse team and coaches his son's travel hockey team.
