= 2005 San Jose Stealth season =

2005 San Jose Stealth
- League: NLL
- Division: 5th West
- 2005 record: 4-12
- Home record: 2-6
- Road record: 2-6
- Goals for: 170
- Goals against: 197
- General Manager: Johnny Mouradian
- Coach: Johnny Mouradian
- Arena: HP Pavilion at San Jose
- Average attendance: 5,435

Team leaders
- Goals: Gary Rosyski (28)
- Assists: Ryan Boyle (42)
- Points: Gary Rosyski (68)
- Penalties in minutes: Spencer Martin (43)
- Loose Balls: Cam Woods (109)
- Wins: Anthony Cosmo (3)
- Goals against average: Brandon Miller (10.43)

The San Jose Stealth are a lacrosse team based in San Jose, California playing in the National Lacrosse League (NLL). The 2005 season was the 2nd in franchise history.

The Stealth finished 2nd in the West in 2004, but did not fare so well in 2005. They started with a 3-2 record, beating division rivals Calgary, Colorado, and Arizona, but then lost 10 of their last 11 games to finish 4-12 and last place overall.

== Regular season ==
=== Conference standings ===
East Division
P	Team	GP	W	L	PCT	GB	Home	Road	GF	GA	Diff	GF/GP	GA/GP
1	Toronto Rock – xyz	16	12	4	.750	0.0	6–2	6–2	227	190	+37	14.19	11.88
2	Buffalo Bandits – x	16	11	5	.688	1.0	5–3	6–2	217	183	+34	13.56	11.44
3	Rochester Knighthawks – x	16	10	6	.625	2.0	5–3	5–3	193	179	+14	12.06	11.19
4	Philadelphia Wings	16	6	10	.375	6.0	3–5	3–5	213	218	−5	13.31	13.62
5	Minnesota Swarm	16	5	11	.312	7.0	2–6	3–5	188	231	−43	11.75	14.44

West Division
P	Team	GP	W	L	PCT	GB	Home	Road	GF	GA	Diff	GF/GP	GA/GP
1	Calgary Roughnecks – xy	16	10	6	.625	0.0	6–2	4–4	216	208	+8	13.50	13.00
2	Arizona Sting – x	16	9	7	.562	1.0	5–3	4–4	209	209	−-0	13.06	13.06
3	Colorado Mammoth – x	16	8	8	.500	2.0	5–3	3–5	201	182	+19	12.56	11.38
4	Anaheim Storm	16	5	11	.312	5.0	2–6	3–5	175	212	−37	10.94	13.25
5	San Jose Stealth	16	4	12	.250	6.0	2–6	2–6	170	197	−27	10.62	12.31

x: Clinched playoff berth; c: Clinched playoff berth by crossing over to another division; y: Clinched division; z: Clinched best regular season record; GP: Games Played
W: Wins; L: Losses; GB: Games back; PCT: Win percentage; Home: Record at Home; Road: Record on the Road; GF: Goals scored; GA: Goals allowed
Differential: Difference between goals scored and allowed; GF/GP: Average number of goals scored per game; GA/GP: Average number of goals allowed per game

=== Game log ===
Game	Date	Opponent	Location	Score	OT	Attendance	Record
1	January 7, 2005	@ Calgary Roughnecks	Pengrowth Saddledome	W 12–10		10,042	1–0
2	January 8, 2005	Calgary Roughnecks	HP Pavilion at San Jose	L 10–14		7,028	1–1
3	January 21, 2005	@ Arizona Sting	Jobing.com Arena	W 14–13		6,216	2–1
4	January 22, 2005	Minnesota Swarm	HP Pavilion at San Jose	L 8–9		5,059	2–2
5	January 29, 2005	Colorado Mammoth	HP Pavilion at San Jose	W 12–10		5,107	3–2
6	February 5, 2005	@ Philadelphia Wings	Wachovia Center	L 13–14		10,025	3–3
7	February 18, 2005	Colorado Mammoth	HP Pavilion at San Jose	L 6–14		5,512	3–4
8	February 24, 2005	@ Colorado Mammoth	Pepsi Center	L 8–14		16,249	3–5
9	March 11, 2005	@ Arizona Sting	Jobing.com Arena	L 12–13	OT	6,614	3–6
10	March 12, 2005	Arizona Sting	HP Pavilion at San Jose	L 10–12		5,069	3–7
11	March 18, 2005	@ Calgary Roughnecks	Pengrowth Saddledome	L 11–15		10,517	3–8
12	March 19, 2005	Calgary Roughnecks	HP Pavilion at San Jose	L 10–11		5,564	3–9
13	March 25, 2005	Anaheim Storm	HP Pavilion at San Jose	W 15–14		5,022	4–9
14	March 26, 2005	@ Anaheim Storm	Arrowhead Pond	L 12–13	OT	4,834	4–10
15	April 8, 2005	Rochester Knighthawks	HP Pavilion at San Jose	L 7–8		5,120	4–11
16	April 16, 2005	@ Buffalo Bandits	HSBC Arena	L 10–13		12,138	4–12

== Player stats ==
=== Runners (Top 10) ===
Note: GP = Games played; G = Goals; A = Assists; Pts = Points; LB = Loose Balls; PIM = Penalty minutes

Player	GP	G	A	Pts	LB	PIM
Gary Rosyski	15	28	40	68	68	29
Ryan Boyle	16	22	42	64	95	12
Derek Malawsky	14	14	36	50	57	10
Curt Malawsky	15	21	26	47	59	14
Cam Sedgwick	14	14	25	39	57	8
Kevin Fines	14	11	8	19	43	19
Ted Dowling	4	10	4	14	17	2
Spencer Martin	10	6	8	14	31	43
Steve Toll	12	4	8	12	76	0
Totals		244	414	366	1037	44

=== Goaltenders ===
Note: GP = Games played; MIN = Minutes; W = Wins; L = Losses; GA = Goals against; Sv% = Save percentage; GAA = Goals against average

Player	GP	MIN	W	L	GA	Sv%	GAA
Anthony Cosmo	15	698:45	3	9	143	.749	12.28
Rob Blasdell	5	157:06	1	2	35	.731	13.37
Brandon Miller	3	103:35	0	1	18	.766	10.43
Totals			4	12	197	.747	12.31

== Awards ==
Player	Award
Ryan Boyle	NLL Rookie of the Year
Ryan Boyle	All-Rookie Team
Ryan Boyle	Rookie of the Month, January
Ryan Boyle	Rookie of the Month, March
Jim Moss	All-Stars
Anthony Cosmo	All-Stars
Ryan Boyle	All-Stars
Gary Rosyski	All-Stars

== Transactions ==
=== Trades ===
March 24, 2005	To San Jose Stealth first round pick, 2005 entry draft second round pick, 2005 entry draft	To Rochester Knighthawks Steve Toll
March 24, 2005	To San Jose Stealth conditional pick, 2005 entry draft	To Calgary Roughnecks Ted Dowling third round pick, 2006 entry draft

== Roster ==
No.		Position	Player
3	(United States)	Fwd	Alrich, Matt
31	(Canada)	Goalie	Blasdell, Rob
14	(United States)	Fwd	Boyle, Ryan
44	(Canada)	Goalie	Cosmo, Anthony
91	(Canada)	Fwd	Dairon, Brad
	(Canada)	Fwd	Dowling, Ted
27	(Canada)	Fwd	Fines, Kevin
	(Canada)	Def	Gibson, Darryl
9	(United States)	Fwd	Gilbert, Luke
6	(Canada)	Fwd	Hodgson, Curtis
19	(United States)	?	Johnson, Ross
11	(Canada)	Fwd	Malawsky, Curt
18	(Canada)	Fwd	Malawsky, Derek

No.		Position	Player
25	(United States)	Def	Martin, Eric
15	(United States)	Fwd	Martin, Spencer
35	(Canada)	Goalie	Miller, Brandon
55	(Canada)	Def	Moss, Jim
88	(United States)	Def	Ogelsby, Matt
20	(Canada)	Fwd	Olson, Kevin
71	(Canada)	Fwd	Ranger, Scott
	(United States)	Fwd	Regan, Mike
32	(Canada)	Def	Reisig, Darren
23	(Canada)	Fwd	Rosyski, Gary
29	(Canada)	Fwd	Sedgwick, Cam
	(Canada)	Def	Toll, Steve
8	(United States)	Def	Virk, Drew
22	(Canada)	Def	Woods, Cam

== See also ==
- 2005 NLL season
