= 2005 Buffalo Bandits season =

Lacrosse team season

2005 Buffalo Bandits
- League: NLL
- Division: 2nd East
- 2005 record: 11–5
- Home record: 5–3
- Road record: 6–2
- Goals for: 217
- Goals against: 183
- General Manager: Darris Kilgour
- Coach: Darris Kilgour
- Captain: Rich Kilgour
- Alternate captains: John Tavares
- Arena: HSBC Arena
- Average attendance: 10,288

Team leaders
- Goals: John Tavares (43)
- Assists: John Tavares (59)
- Points: John Tavares (102)
- Penalties in minutes: Billy Dee Smith (60)
- Loose Balls: Mark Steenhuis (141)
- Wins: Steve Dietrich (9)
- Goals against average: Steve Dietrich (10.96)

The Buffalo Bandits are a lacrosse team based in Buffalo playing in the National Lacrosse League (NLL). The 2005 season was the 14th season in franchise history.

The Bandits finished second in the East after stellar seasons from veterans John Tavares and Steve Dietrich, who was named Goaltender of the Year. They hosted the Rochester Knighthawks in the division semi-final game, but the Knighthawks defeated the Bandits, 19–14, winning the right to face the eventual champion Toronto Rock in the division finals.

== Regular season ==
=== Conference standings ===
East Division
P	Team	GP	W	L	PCT	GB	Home	Road	GF	GA	Diff	GF/GP	GA/GP
1	Toronto Rock – xyz	16	12	4	.750	0.0	6–2	6–2	227	190	+37	14.19	11.88
2	Buffalo Bandits – x	16	11	5	.688	1.0	5–3	6–2	217	183	+34	13.56	11.44
3	Rochester Knighthawks – x	16	10	6	.625	2.0	5–3	5–3	193	179	+14	12.06	11.19
4	Philadelphia Wings	16	6	10	.375	6.0	3–5	3–5	213	218	−5	13.31	13.62
5	Minnesota Swarm	16	5	11	.312	7.0	2–6	3–5	188	231	−43	11.75	14.44

West Division
P	Team	GP	W	L	PCT	GB	Home	Road	GF	GA	Diff	GF/GP	GA/GP
1	Calgary Roughnecks – xy	16	10	6	.625	0.0	6–2	4–4	216	208	+8	13.50	13.00
2	Arizona Sting – x	16	9	7	.562	1.0	5–3	4–4	209	209	−-0	13.06	13.06
3	Colorado Mammoth – x	16	8	8	.500	2.0	5–3	3–5	201	182	+19	12.56	11.38
4	Anaheim Storm	16	5	11	.312	5.0	2–6	3–5	175	212	−37	10.94	13.25
5	San Jose Stealth	16	4	12	.250	6.0	2–6	2–6	170	197	−27	10.62	12.31

x: Clinched playoff berth; c: Clinched playoff berth by crossing over to another division; y: Clinched division; z: Clinched best regular season record; GP: Games Played
W: Wins; L: Losses; GB: Games back; PCT: Win percentage; Home: Record at Home; Road: Record on the Road; GF: Goals scored; GA: Goals allowed
Differential: Difference between goals scored and allowed; GF/GP: Average number of goals scored per game; GA/GP: Average number of goals allowed per game

=== Game log ===
Game	Date	Opponent	Location	Score	OT	Attendance	Record
1	January 7, 2005	Toronto Rock	HSBC Arena	L 13–15		11,067	0–1
2	January 21, 2005	@ Minnesota Swarm	Xcel Energy Center	W 15–10		13,198	1–1
3	January 22, 2005	@ Colorado Mammoth	Pepsi Center	L 8–11		18,137	1–2
4	January 28, 2005	@ Philadelphia Wings	Wachovia Center	W 15–10		8,849	2–2
5	January 29, 2005	Philadelphia Wings	HSBC Arena	W 20–16		10,945	3–2
6	February 11, 2005	Anaheim Storm	HSBC Arena	W 20–9		8,805	4–2
7	February 19, 2005	@ Rochester Knighthawks	Blue Cross Arena	W 11–7		9,961	5–2
8	February 25, 2005	Philadelphia Wings	HSBC Arena	L 8–14		8,912	5–3
9	March 4, 2005	@ Toronto Rock	Air Canada Centre	W 14–12		17,756	6–3
10	March 11, 2005	@ Minnesota Swarm	Xcel Energy Center	W 23–16		8,254	7–3
11	March 18, 2005	Minnesota Swarm	HSBC Arena	W 13–11		9,116	8–3
12	March 19, 2005	@ Rochester Knighthawks	Blue Cross Arena	L 11–12	OT	10,102	8–4
13	March 26, 2005	Toronto Rock	HSBC Arena	L 8–12		11,309	8–5
14	April 1, 2005	Rochester Knighthawks	HSBC Arena	W 11–9		10,014	9–5
15	April 9, 2005	@ Calgary Roughnecks	Pengrowth Saddledome	W 14–9		10,183	10–5
16	April 16, 2005	San Jose Stealth	HSBC Arena	W 13–10		12,138	11–5

== Playoffs ==
=== Game log ===
Game	Date	Opponent	Location	Score	OT	Attendance	Record
Division Semifinal	April 23, 2005	Rochester Knighthawks	HSBC Arena	L 14–19		10,014	0–1

== Player stats ==
=== Runners (Top 10) ===
Note: GP = Games played; G = Goals; A = Assists; Pts = Points; LB = Loose Balls; PIM = Penalty minutes

Player	GP	G	A	Pts	LB	PIM
John Tavares	16	43	59	102	126	9
Dan Teat	16	26	39	65	84	24
Mark Steenhuis	16	34	28	62	141	23
Jason Crosbie	14	20	30	50	69	10
Delby Powless	13	20	24	44	57	4
A.J. Shannon	16	25	15	40	78	8
Aime Caines	13	13	15	28	33	10
Pat McCready	13	7	16	23	77	44
Bryan Kazarian	13	1	17	18	53	20
Totals		304	521	414	1137	40

=== Goaltenders ===
Note: GP = Games played; MIN = Minutes; W = Wins; L = Losses; GA = Goals against; Sv% = Save percentage; GAA = Goals against average

Player	GP	MIN	W	L	GA	Sv%	GAA
Steve Dietrich	15	749:43	9	4	137	.789	10.96
Derek General	8	209:19	2	1	46	.718	13.19
Totals			11	5	183	.774	11.44

== Awards ==
Player	Award
Steve Dietrich	Goaltender of the Year
John Tavares	First Team All-Pro
Steve Dietrich	First Team All-Pro
Delby Powless	All-Rookie Team
John Tavares	Overall Player of the Month, January
John Tavares	Overall Player of the Month, March (tie with Bob Watson)
John Tavares	All-Stars
Kyle Couling	All-Stars
Mark Steenhuis	All-Stars
Dan Teat	All-Stars

== Transactions ==
=== Trades ===
February 2, 2005	To Buffalo Bandits second round pick, 2005 entry draft second round pick, 2007 entry draft	To Arizona Sting Jonas Derks

== Roster ==
No.		Position	Player
49	(Canada)	Fwd	Caines, Aime
25	(Canada)	Def	Candy, Drew
27	(Canada)	Def	Couling, Kyle
54	(Canada)	Fwd	Crosbie, Jason
13	(Canada)	Fwd	Derks, Jonas
30	(Canada)	Goalie	Dietrich, Steve
26	(Canada)	Def	Floris, Greg
19	(United States)	Def	Francey, Tyler
85	(Canada)	Goalie	General, Derek
7	(Canada)	Fwd	Harasym, Jon
5	(Haudenosaunee)	Def	Hill, Clay
90	(Canada)	Fwd	Hominuck, Mike

No.		Position	Player
14	(Haudenosaunee)	Fwd	Jamieson, Kyle
97	(Canada)	Fwd	Kazarian, Bryan
16	(United States)	Def	Kilgour, Rich
17	(Canada)	Def	Laverty, Kyle
23	(Canada)	Def	McCready, Pat
63	(United States)	Fwd	Montour, Thomas
99	(United States)	Fwd	Powless, Delby
8	(Canada)	Fwd	Shannon, A.J.
3	(Canada)	Def	Smith, Billy Dee
9	(Canada)	Fwd	Steenhuis, Mark
11	(Canada)	Fwd	Tavares, John
15	(Canada)	Fwd	Teat, Dan
6	(Canada)	Def	White, Chris

== See also ==
- 2005 NLL season
