= 2005 Colorado Mammoth season =

2005 Colorado Mammoth
- League: NLL
- Division: 3rd West
- 2005 record: 8-8
- Home record: 5-3
- Road record: 3-5
- Goals for: 201
- Goals against: 182
- General Manager: Steve Govett
- Coach: Jamie Batley
- Captain: Gavin Prout
- Alternate captains: Gary Gait
- Arena: Pepsi Center
- Average attendance: 12,456

Team leaders
- Goals: Gary Gait (33)
- Assists: Gavin Prout (50)
- Points: Gary Gait (81)
- Penalties in minutes: Jamie Hanford (45)
- Loose Balls: Jay Jalbert (141)
- Wins: Gee Nash (8)
- Goals against average: Gee Nash (11.16)

The Colorado Mammoth are a lacrosse team based in Colorado playing in the National Lacrosse League (NLL). The 2005 season was the 19th in franchise history and 3rd as the Mammoth (previously the Washington Power, Pittsburgh Crossefire, and Baltimore Thunder).

The 2005 season was lacrosse legend Gary Gait's final season as a player. He led the Mammoth to an 8–8 record, 3rd in the Western division, but they were eliminated from the playoffs by the Arizona Sting in the division finals. Gait would take over as the Mammoth's head coach the next season.

== Regular season ==
=== Conference standings ===
East Division
P	Team	GP	W	L	PCT	GB	Home	Road	GF	GA	Diff	GF/GP	GA/GP
1	Toronto Rock – xyz	16	12	4	.750	0.0	6–2	6–2	227	190	+37	14.19	11.88
2	Buffalo Bandits – x	16	11	5	.688	1.0	5–3	6–2	217	183	+34	13.56	11.44
3	Rochester Knighthawks – x	16	10	6	.625	2.0	5–3	5–3	193	179	+14	12.06	11.19
4	Philadelphia Wings	16	6	10	.375	6.0	3–5	3–5	213	218	−5	13.31	13.62
5	Minnesota Swarm	16	5	11	.312	7.0	2–6	3–5	188	231	−43	11.75	14.44

West Division
P	Team	GP	W	L	PCT	GB	Home	Road	GF	GA	Diff	GF/GP	GA/GP
1	Calgary Roughnecks – xy	16	10	6	.625	0.0	6–2	4–4	216	208	+8	13.50	13.00
2	Arizona Sting – x	16	9	7	.562	1.0	5–3	4–4	209	209	−-0	13.06	13.06
3	Colorado Mammoth – x	16	8	8	.500	2.0	5–3	3–5	201	182	+19	12.56	11.38
4	Anaheim Storm	16	5	11	.312	5.0	2–6	3–5	175	212	−37	10.94	13.25
5	San Jose Stealth	16	4	12	.250	6.0	2–6	2–6	170	197	−27	10.62	12.31

x: Clinched playoff berth; c: Clinched playoff berth by crossing over to another division; y: Clinched division; z: Clinched best regular season record; GP: Games Played
W: Wins; L: Losses; GB: Games back; PCT: Win percentage; Home: Record at Home; Road: Record on the Road; GF: Goals scored; GA: Goals allowed
Differential: Difference between goals scored and allowed; GF/GP: Average number of goals scored per game; GA/GP: Average number of goals allowed per game

=== Game log ===
Game	Date	Opponent	Location	Score	OT	Attendance	Record
1	January 1, 2005	Calgary Roughnecks	Pepsi Center	W 12–7		16,397	1–0
2	January 8, 2005	Arizona Sting	Pepsi Center	L 15–16		17,289	1–1
3	January 22, 2005	Buffalo Bandits	Pepsi Center	W 11–8		18,137	2–1
4	January 29, 2005	@ San Jose Stealth	HP Pavilion at San Jose	L 10–12		5,107	2–2
5	February 4, 2005	@ Calgary Roughnecks	Pengrowth Saddledome	L 16–18		10,031	2–3
6	February 13, 2005	Arizona Sting	Pepsi Center	W 13–12	OT	16,238	3–3
7	February 18, 2005	@ San Jose Stealth	HP Pavilion at San Jose	W 14–6		5,512	4–3
8	February 24, 2005	San Jose Stealth	Pepsi Center	W 14–8		16,249	5–3
9	March 4, 2005	@ Anaheim Storm	Arrowhead Pond	W 13–12		4,500	6–3
10	March 13, 2005	Calgary Roughnecks	Pepsi Center	L 10–13		17,380	6–4
11	March 18, 2005	@ Philadelphia Wings	Wachovia Center	L 12–15		11,742	6–5
12	March 19, 2005	Anaheim Storm	Pepsi Center	W 16–8		16,270	7–5
13	April 1, 2005	@ Minnesota Swarm	Xcel Energy Center	W 15–9		10,054	8–5
14	April 2, 2005	Anaheim Storm	Pepsi Center	L 6–10		18,326	8–6
15	April 9, 2005	@ Arizona Sting	Jobing.com Arena	L 12–15		6,735	8–7
16	April 15, 2005	@ Rochester Knighthawks	Blue Cross Arena	L 12–13		9,342	8–8

== Playoffs ==
=== Game log ===
Game	Date	Opponent	Location	Score	OT	Attendance	Record
Division Final	April 22, 2005	@ Arizona Sting	Jobing.com Arena	L 13–16		5,549	0–1

== Player stats ==
=== Runners (Top 10) ===
Note: GP = Games played; G = Goals; A = Assists; Pts = Points; LB = Loose Balls; PIM = Penalty minutes

Player	GP	G	A	Pts	LB	PIM
Gary Gait	16	33	48	81	81	4
Gavin Prout	16	28	50	78	80	32
Dan Stroup	16	31	10	41	67	0
Jay Jalbert	16	18	22	40	141	40
Josh Sims	16	14	14	28	111	12
Brian Langtry	10	16	11	27	37	10
Del Halladay	11	11	12	23	39	6
Chris Panos	9	8	15	23	30	10
Chris Prat	9	7	12	19	31	20
Totals		287	488	372	1065	47

=== Goaltenders ===
Note: GP = Games played; MIN = Minutes; W = Wins; L = Losses; GA = Goals against; Sv% = Save percentage; GAA = Goals against average

Player	GP	MIN	W	L	GA	Sv%	GAA
Gee Nash	16	940:41	8	8	175	.774	11.16
John McLellan	1	17:12	0	0	5	.792	17.44
Erik Miller	1	0:00	0	0	0	.000	.00
Tom Still	0	0:00	0	0	0	.000	.00
Totals			8	8	182	.773	11.38

== Awards ==
Player	Award
Gary Gait	NLL Sportsmanship Award
Gary Gait	Second Team All-Pro
Gary Gait	All-Stars
Pat Coyle	All-Stars
Gee Nash	All-Stars
Gavin Prout	All-Stars

== Transactions ==
=== Trades ===
March 24, 2005	To Colorado Mammoth third round pick, 2005 entry draft	To Arizona Sting Chris Panos

== Roster ==
No.		Position	Player
8	(Canada)	Fwd	Carlson, Nick
2	(United States)	Def	Coyle, Pat
72	(Canada)	Fwd	Daly, Randy
28	(United States)	Def	Ethington, Tom
22	(Canada)	Fwd	Gait, Gary
19	(United States)	Fwd	Gait, Paul
11	(Canada)	Def	Gallant, John
3	(United States)	Fwd	Halladay, Del
5	(United States)	Def	Hanford, Jamie
10	(United States)	Def	Jalbert, Jay
6	(United States)	Fwd	Langtry, Brian
29	(Canada)	Goalie	McLellan, John
	(United States)	Goalie	Miller, Erik

No.		Position	Player
39	(Canada)	Def	Miyashita, Mark
38	(Canada)	Goalie	Nash, Gee
	(United States)	Fwd	Panos, Chris
7	(Canada)	Fwd	Prat, Chris
9	(United States)	Fwd	Prout, Gavin
34	(United States)	Def	Reese, Brian
23	(Canada)	Fwd	Self, Brad
24	(United States)	Fwd	Sims, Josh
	(United States)	Fwd	Sonke, Jeff
20	(Canada)	Def	Stapleford, Scott
0	(Canada)	Goalie	Still, Tom
77	(United States)	Def	Stilley, Dave
88	(Canada)	Fwd	Stroup, Dan

== See also ==
- 2005 NLL season
