= Bob Hamley =

Lacrosse GM, coach and player

Bob Hamley is the current General Manager of the Panther City Lacrosse Club of the National Lacrosse League. He is also a former head coach and General Manager of the Edmonton Rush and Colorado Mammoth, and a former NLL player.

Hamley played four seasons with the Buffalo Bandits, winning two Championships. Following his playing career, he became head coach and GM of the Kitchener-Waterloo Braves of the Ontario Lacrosse Association. After three years in Kitchener-Waterloo, Hamley was named an assistant coach to Bob McMahon of the Albany Attack, and took the team that had the league's worst offense in 2001 to the 2002 Championship game, losing at home to the Toronto Rock.

In September 2002, Hamley was named head coach and GM of the Columbus Landsharks. In 2003, the Landsharks moved to Arizona, becoming the Sting. Hamley hired Bob McMahon, his boss in Albany, to be an assistant coach.

In the 2005 season, the Sting finished second in the Western Division, and beat both Colorado and Calgary to make it to the Championship game. However, history would repeat itself as Hamley and McMahon were denied the Championship once again by the Toronto Rock. Hamley was named the 2005 recipient of the Les Bartley Award for Coach of the Year, and the next day was also named GM of the Year, becoming the first person in league history to win both awards. In the 2007 NLL season, he again brought his team to the championship game, this time losing to the Rochester Knighthawks. Hamley continued to serve as the Stings head coach and General Manager until the 2008 NLL season, when the Sting decided for "a number of business reasons" to opt out of the 2008 season following the labor dispute.

Due to the Sting suspending operations for the 2008 season, Hamley joined the Colorado Mammoth as an assistant coach under Bob McMahon. This reunion was short-lived. The Edmonton Rush, after starting the 2008 NLL season with an 0-5 record, fired head coach and general manager coach, Paul Day, and hired Hamley to replace him. Hamley led the Rush to a 4-7 record, finishing the season 4-12 and last in the West. Hamley made extensive changes to the team in the off-season, but in 2009, the Rush finished last in the West once again and Hamley was fired.

Hamley remained out of work until March 2010, when he was hired by the Colorado Mammoth as their new head coach. Once again, Hamley's first move was to hire his old friend Bob McMahon as an assistant coach. On September 1, 2020 Hamley was named GM and VP of lacrosse operations for the expansion Panther City LC franchise.

== Statistics ==
=== NLL ===
| | | Regular Season | | | | | | Playoffs |
| Season | Team | GP | G | A | Pts | LB | PIM | GP | G | A | Pts | LB | PIM |
|---|---|---|---|---|---|---|---|---|---|---|---|---|---|
| 1992 | Buffalo | 8 | 13 | 15 | 28 | 26 | 14 | 3 | 6 | 6 | 12 | 13 | 8 |
| 1993 | Buffalo | 8 | 14 | 19 | 33 | 37 | 9 | 2 | 2 | 5 | 7 | 12 | 6 |
| 1994 | Buffalo | 8 | 12 | 13 | 25 | 28 | 12 | 2 | 5 | 4 | 9 | 11 | 0 |
| 1995 | Buffalo | 7 | 5 | 14 | 19 | 12 | 10 | 1 | 0 | 2 | 2 | 2 | 2 |
| NLL totals | | 31 | 44 | 61 | 105 | 103 | 45 | 8 | 13 | 17 | 30 | 38 | 16 |

=== NLL head coaching statistics ===
| Team | Season | Regular Season | | | | Playoffs | | | | Playoff result |
| Team | Season | GC | W | L | W% | GC | W | L | W% | Playoff result |
|---|---|---|---|---|---|---|---|---|---|---|
| Columbus Landsharks | 2003 | 16 | 8 | 8 | .500 | – | – | – | – | Did not qualify |
| Arizona Sting | 2004 | 16 | 7 | 9 | .438 | – | – | – | – | Did not qualify |
| Arizona Sting | 2005 | 16 | 9 | 7 | .563 | 3 | 2 | 1 | .667 | Lost Champions' Cup (TOR) |
| Arizona Sting | 2006 | 16 | 8 | 8 | .500 | 2 | 1 | 1 | .500 | Lost Division Final (COL) |
| Arizona Sting | 2007 | 16 | 9 | 7 | .563 | 3 | 2 | 1 | .667 | Lost Champions' Cup (ROC) |
| Edmonton Rush | 2008* | 11 | 4 | 7 | .364 | – | – | – | – | Did not qualify |
| Edmonton Rush | 2009 | 16 | 5 | 11 | .313 | – | – | – | – | Did not qualify |
| Colorado Mammoth | 2010** | 7 | 2 | 5 | .286 | – | – | – | – | Did not qualify |
| Colorado Mammoth | 2011 | 16 | 5 | 11 | .313 | – | – | – | – | Did not qualify |
| Colorado Mammoth | 2012 | 16 | 11 | 5 | .688 | 1 | 0 | 1 | .000 | Lost Division Semifinal (MIN) |
| Colorado Mammoth | 2013 | 16 | 7 | 9 | .438 | 1 | 0 | 1 | .000 | Lost Division Semifinal (CGY) |
| Colorado Mammoth | 2014*** | 18 | 8 | 10 | .444 | 1 | 0 | 1 | .000 | Lost Division Semifinals (CGY) |
| Totals: | 12 | 180 | 83 | 97 | .461 | 11 | 5 | 6 | .455 | |

* - interim head coach
** - Hamley took over HC duties on March 22
*** - Shared head coaching duties with Pat Coyle, Chris Gill, and Dan Stroup

== Awards ==
| Preceded by John Mouradian | NLL GM of the Year; 2005 | Succeeded by Derek Keenan |
| Preceded by Paul Day | Les Bartley Award; 2005 | Succeeded by Derek Keenan |
