= Derek Keenan =

Canadian lacrosse coach (born 1961)

Derek Keenan (born October 2, 1961, in Oshawa, Ontario) is a former lacrosse player, and current head coach and general manager of the Saskatchewan Rush of the National Lacrosse League. Keenan has won the NLL GM of the Year award and the Les Bartley Award for Coach of the Year three times each; he won both awards in 2006, 2010, and 2014 though he shared the 2010 Bartley Award with Chris Hall.

== Career ==
After a long amateur career, (with the Oshawa Green Gaels and the Brooklin Redmen of the Ontario Junior and Senior Leagues respectively, and Ithaca College where he made All-American), and appearances with the Canadian National Field team at several world championships, Keenan began professional play in 1992 with the Buffalo Bandits, where he won the 1992 Rookie of the Year Award. The Bandits won the Champions Cup in both of Keenan's seasons with the team. After a five-year break, he played six games with the Toronto Rock in 1999, before becoming an assistant coach under Les Bartley. The Rock won the 1999 NLL Championship, and with Bartley at the helm and Keenan and Ed Comeau as assistant coaches, the Rock went to the championship game in each of the next four seasons, winning three times, in 2000, 2002, and 2003.

In November 2003, Bartley stepped down due to his battle with colon cancer, and Keenan was promoted to interim general manager, while Comeau was given the job of interim head coach. However, less than four months later, after a 2–4 start, both Keenan and Comeau were fired by the Rock, replaced by Terry Sanderson.

In 2005, Keenan was hired by the Anaheim Storm, becoming their head coach and general manager. He improved the Storm from a dismal 1–15 record in 2004 to a 5–11 record in 2005. However, the Storm folded after the 2005 season due to low attendance.

In July 2005, Keenan was named head coach and general manager of the then-unnamed Portland expansion franchise. The team was named the "LumberJax", and finished the 2006 season 11–5, becoming the first expansion team in NLL history to finish first in its division. Keenan was awarded both the GM of the Year Award and the Les Bartley Award for coach of the year. As of November 2012 he was the coach of the Edmonton Rush of the National Lacrosse League. He was inducted into the Canadian Lacrosse Hall of Fame in November, 2012

Keenan is the second cousin of former NHL head coach Mike Keenan. Keenan's wife, Wendy, was the sister of Hockey Hall of Famer, Joe Nieuwendyk. Wendy died on January 2, 2015, at age 51.

== Statistics ==
=== National Lacrosse League ===
		Regular Season						Playoffs
Season	Team	GP	G	A	Pts	LB	PIM	GP	G	A	Pts	LB	PIM
1992	Buffalo	8	26	23	42	41	8	3	6	10	16	18	2
1993	Buffalo	8	22	12	34	35	5	2	5	8	13	19	8
1999	Toronto	6	4	7	11	15	0	--	--	--	--	--	--
NLL totals		22	52	42	94	91	13	5	11	18	29	37	10

=== NLL head coaching statistics ===
Team	Season	Regular season				Playoffs				Playoff result
Team	Season	GC	W	L	W%	GC	W	L	W%	Playoff result
Anaheim Storm	2005	16	5	11	.313	–	–	–	–	Did not qualify
Portland LumberJax	2006	16	11	5	.688	1	0	1	.000	Lost Division Semifinal (ARZ)
Portland LumberJax	2007	16	4	12	.250	–	–	–	–	Did not qualify
Portland LumberJax	2008	16	6	10	.375	3	2	1	.667	Lost Champions' Cup (BUF)
Portland LumberJax	2009	16	9	7	.562	1	0	1	.000	Lost Division Semifinal (SJ)
Edmonton Rush	2010	16	10	6	.625	2	1	1	.500	Lost Division Final (WSH)
Edmonton Rush	2011	16	5	11	.312	–	–	–	–	Did not qualify
Edmonton Rush	2012	16	6	10	.375	3	2	1	.667	Lost Champions' Cup (ROC)
Edmonton Rush	2013	16	9	7	.562	1	0	1	.000	Lost Division Semifinal (WSH)
Edmonton Rush	2014	18	16	2	.889	3	1	2	.333	Lost Division Final (CGY)
Edmonton Rush	2015	18	13	5	.722	5	4	1	.800	Won Champions' Cup (TOR)
Saskatchewan Rush	2016	18	13	5	.722	4	4	0	1.000	Won Champions' Cup (BUF)
Saskatchewan Rush	2017	18	12	6	.667	4	2	2	.500	Lost Champions' Cup (GA)
Saskatchewan Rush	2018	18	14	4	.778	4	3	1	.750	Won NLL Finals (ROC)
Saskatchewan Rush	2019	18	11	7	.611	1	0	1	.000	Lost Western Division Semifinal (COL)
Totals:	15	252	144	108	.571	32	19	13	.594	

== Awards ==
Preceded by Gary Gait	NLL Rookie of the Year; 1992	Succeeded by Tom Marechek (1994)
Preceded by Bob Hamley; Ed Comeau; Doug Locker	NLL GM of the Year; 2006; 2010; 2014	Succeeded by Marty O'Neill; Curt Styres; Terry Sanderson
Preceded by Bob Hamley; Troy Cordingley; Troy Cordingley	Les Bartley Award; 2006; 2010 (tie with Chris Hall); 2014	Succeeded by Ed Comeau; Mike Hasen; John Lovell
