= 2005 NLL season =

- League: National Lacrosse League
- Sport: Indoor lacrosse
- Duration: January 1, 2005 – May 14, 2005
- Games: 16
- Teams: 10
- TV partner(s): NBC and America One (United States); The Score (Canada)

Regular season
- Season MVP: Colin Doyle (Toronto Rock)
- Top scorer: Colin Doyle (Toronto Rock)

Playoffs
- Eastern champions: Toronto Rock
- Eastern runners-up: Buffalo Bandits
- Western champions: Calgary Roughnecks
- Western runners-up: Arizona Sting

Champion's Cup
- Champions: Toronto Rock (5th title)
- Runners-up: Arizona Sting
- Finals MVP: Colin Doyle (Toronto)

NLL seasons
- ← 2004 season 2006 season →

The 2005 National Lacrosse League season is the 19th season of the NLL that began on January 1, 2005 and concluded with the championship game on May 14. The Toronto Rock won their fifth NLL championship, defeating the Arizona Sting 19–13 in Toronto.

Colin Doyle of the Toronto Rock won the scoring title, marking the first time since 1990 that someone other than Gary Gait, Paul Gait, or John Tavares has led the league in scoring. For his efforts in leading the Rock to the championship, Doyle was named both league MVP and Championship Game MVP.

Just hours after the Rock's championship victory, another lacrosse legend, former Toronto head coach and general manager Les Bartley died from colon cancer at age 51. Bartley had coached the Buffalo Bandits to three MILL/NLL championships before moving to the expansion Ontario Raiders in 1998. Bartley moved with the Raiders to Toronto the next year, and went on to win titles in four of the next five seasons. Bartley also won the NLL Executive of the Year award in 2005, in part due to his involvement in the negotiation of the new CBA.

The 2005 season featured the NLL retirement of two lacrosse legends: Gary Gait and Tom Marechek. Marechek played his entire 12-year career with the Philadelphia Wings, winning Rookie of the Year in 1994, as well as four championships with the Wings. He was named to the All-Pro team eight times, and is third all-time in the NLL in points, after only Gary Gait and John Tavares . Marechek announced his retirement shortly before the end of the season.

Gait, at the time the league's all-time leading scorer, announced his retirement shortly before the season began. He was named League MVP six times, won seven scoring titles, and was named an All-Pro an astonishing 14 times in 14 seasons. With four games left in the regular season, Gait managed to coax his twin brother Paul out of retirement to play with him. However, Colorado was eliminated in the division semi-finals by Arizona, so Gait's dream of winning the championship in his final season did not come to fruition. He did win the championship in his first year as head coach of the Mammoth the next year.

== Labour dispute ==
The collective bargaining agreement (CBA) between the league and the Professional Lacrosse Players' Association (PLPA) expired at the end of the 2004 season, and negotiations for a new CBA took place over the summer. However, these negotiations did not result in a new agreement, and the NLL even accused the PLPA of negotiating in bad faith. The league made its "last, best, and final offer" to the PLPA on September 29, 2004, and announced that if this offer was not accepted by the players, the season would be officially cancelled on October 2.

Marathon negotiations continued until early morning on October 1, and resulted in two different proposals. Both were presented to the players that day with the stipulation that if neither of them was acceptable, the season would be cancelled. One of the two proposals (a three-year deal) was accepted, and the season went on as scheduled.

== Team movement ==
The season featured a new team added to the East division, and one removed from the West. The ownership of the Minnesota Wild NHL team purchased the rights to the old Montreal Express franchise, moving it to Minnesota and renaming it the Minnesota Swarm, while the Vancouver Ravens franchise was removed from the schedule less than three weeks before the start of the season.

=== Teams ===
2005 National Lacrosse League
Division	Team	City	Arena	Capacity
East	Buffalo Bandits	Buffalo, New York	HSBC Arena	18,690
East	Minnesota Swarm	Saint Paul, Minnesota	XCEL Energy Center	18,064
East	Philadelphia Wings	Philadelphia, Pennsylvania	Wachovia Center	19,523
East	Rochester Knighthawks	Rochester, New York	Blue Cross Arena	10,662
East	Toronto Rock	Toronto, Ontario	Air Canada Centre	18,800
West	Anaheim Storm	Anaheim, California	Arrowhead Pond	17,174
West	Arizona Sting	Glendale, Arizona	Glendale Arena	17,125
West	Calgary Roughnecks	Calgary, Alberta	Pengrowth Saddledome	19,289
West	Colorado Mammoth	Denver, Colorado	Pepsi Center	18,007
West	San Jose Stealth	San Jose, California	HP Pavilion	17,496

=== Map of teams ===
East Division West Division

== Milestones ==
- February 10: Buffalo Bandits legend John Tavares became the first player in league history to reach 500 assists, as the Bandits defeated the Anaheim Storm 20–9.
- February 18: Tavares reaches another milestone in his very next game, scoring his 1000th point in an 11–7 defeat of Rochester. Tavares becomes only the second player ever to reach that milestone, following Gary Gait.

== Final standings ==
=== Regular season ===
East Division
P	Team	GP	W	L	PCT	GB	Home	Road	GF	GA	Diff	GF/GP	GA/GP
1	Toronto Rock – xyz	16	12	4	.750	0.0	6–2	6–2	227	190	+37	14.19	11.88
2	Buffalo Bandits – x	16	11	5	.688	1.0	5–3	6–2	217	183	+34	13.56	11.44
3	Rochester Knighthawks – x	16	10	6	.625	2.0	5–3	5–3	193	179	+14	12.06	11.19
4	Philadelphia Wings	16	6	10	.375	6.0	3–5	3–5	213	218	−5	13.31	13.62
5	Minnesota Swarm	16	5	11	.312	7.0	2–6	3–5	188	231	−43	11.75	14.44

West Division
P	Team	GP	W	L	PCT	GB	Home	Road	GF	GA	Diff	GF/GP	GA/GP
1	Calgary Roughnecks – xy	16	10	6	.625	0.0	6–2	4–4	216	208	+8	13.50	13.00
2	Arizona Sting – x	16	9	7	.562	1.0	5–3	4–4	209	209	−-0	13.06	13.06
3	Colorado Mammoth – x	16	8	8	.500	2.0	5–3	3–5	201	182	+19	12.56	11.38
4	Anaheim Storm	16	5	11	.312	5.0	2–6	3–5	175	212	−37	10.94	13.25
5	San Jose Stealth	16	4	12	.250	6.0	2–6	2–6	170	197	−27	10.62	12.31

x: Clinched playoff berth; c: Clinched playoff berth by crossing over to another division; y: Clinched division; z: Clinched best regular season record; GP: Games Played
W: Wins; L: Losses; GB: Games back; PCT: Win percentage; Home: Record at Home; Road: Record on the Road; GF: Goals scored; GA: Goals allowed
Differential: Difference between goals scored and allowed; GF/GP: Average number of goals scored per game; GA/GP: Average number of goals allowed per game

=== Playoffs ===
Divisional Semifinals
East Division
3	Rochester	17
2	Buffalo	16
West Division
3	Colorado	13
2	Arizona	16

Divisional Finals
3	Rochester	10
1	Toronto	12
2	Arizona	19
1	Calgary	15

Championship
E1	Toronto	19
W2	Arizona	13

- Toronto hosted the championship game.

== All Star Game ==
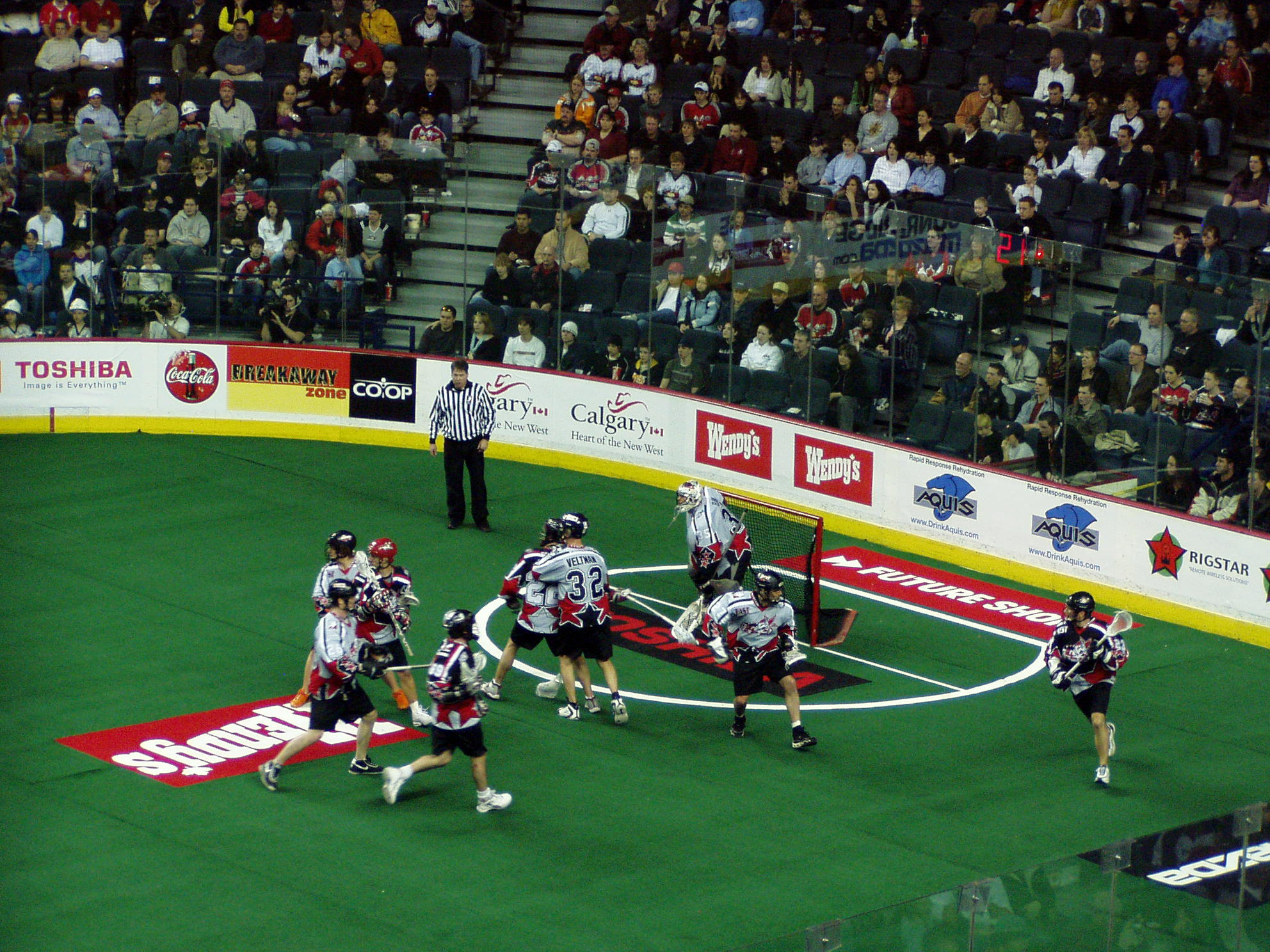
The 2005 NLL All-Star Game in Calgary, Alberta.

The 2005 All-Star Game was held at the Pengrowth Saddledome in Calgary, Alberta on February 26, 2005. The East division defeated the West 11–10 in a thrilling overtime game. John Tavares scored the winner, and hometown captain Tracy Kelusky was named game MVP.

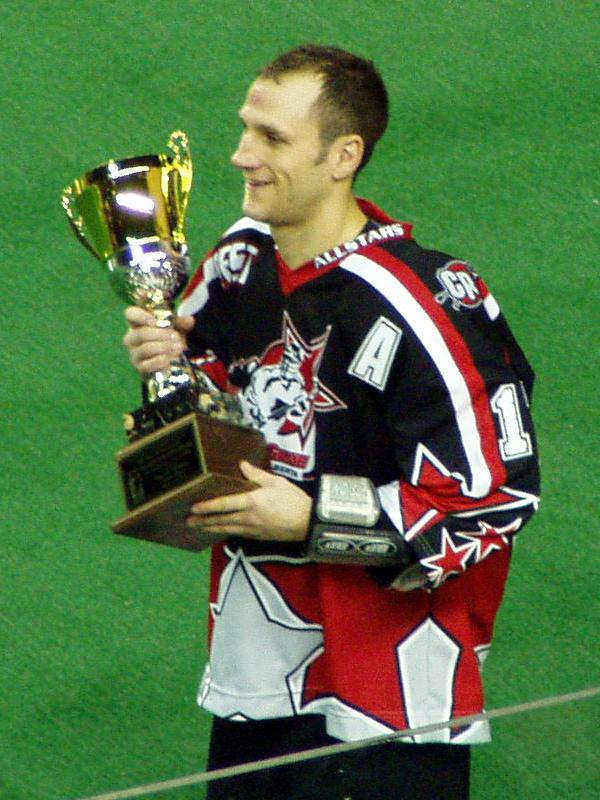
Tracey Kelusky winning the 2005 All Star Game MVP

=== All-Star teams ===
Eastern Division starters	Western Division starters
John Grant, Jr., Rochester	Dan Dawson, Arizona
Blaine Manning, Toronto	Gary Gait, Colorado
John Tavares, Buffalo	Tracey Kelusky, Calgary
Glenn Clark, Toronto	Pat Coyle, Colorado
Andrew Turner, Rochester	Jim Moss, San Jose
Pat O'Toole, Rochester (goalie)	Anthony Cosmo, San Jose (goalie)
Eastern Division Reserves	Western Division Reserves
Craig Conn, Minnesota	Ryan Boyle, San Jose
Kyle Couling, Buffalo	Craig Gelsvik, Calgary
Ryan Cousins, Minnesota	Peter Lough, Arizona
Colin Doyle, Toronto	Gee Nash, Colorado (goalie)
Dallas Eliuk, Philadelphia (goalie)	Jesse Phillips, Calgary
Thomas Hajek, Philadelphia	Casey Powell, Anaheim
Mike Hasen, Rochester	Gavin Prout, Colorado
Tom Marechek, Philadelphia	Lewis Ratcliff, Calgary
Mark Steenhuis, Buffalo	Gary Rosyski, San Jose
Dan Teat, Buffalo	Scott Self, Arizona
Shawn Williams, Rochester	Mike Law, Anaheim
Jim Veltman, Toronto	Kaleb Toth, Calgary

== Awards ==
=== Annual ===
Award	Winner	Team
MVP Award	Colin Doyle	Toronto
Rookie of the Year Award	Ryan Boyle	San Jose
Les Bartley Award (Coach of the Year)	Bob Hamley	Arizona
GM of the Year Award	Bob Hamley	Arizona
Executive of the Year Award	Les Bartley	Toronto
Defensive Player of the Year Award	Andrew Turner	Rochester
Goaltender of the Year Award	Steve Dietrich	Buffalo
Sportsmanship Award	Gary Gait	Colorado
Championship Game MVP	Colin Doyle	Toronto

=== All-Pro Teams ===
==== First Team ====
- Colin Doyle, Toronto
- John Grant, Jr., Rochester
- John Tavares, Buffalo
- Dan Dawson, Arizona
- Steve Dietrich, Buffalo
- Andrew Turner, Rochester

==== Second Team ====
- Gary Gait, Colorado
- Blaine Manning, Toronto
- Josh Sanderson, Toronto
- Jim Veltman, Toronto
- Bob Watson, Toronto
- Tracey Kelusky, Calgary

=== All-Rookie Team ===
- Ryan Boyle, San Jose
- Delby Powless, Buffalo
- Andrew Burkholder, Philadelphia
- Rory Glaves, Anaheim
- Ryder Bateman, Minnesota
- Dan Finck, Philadelphia

=== Weekly awards ===
The NLL gives out awards weekly for the best overall player, best offensive player, best defensive player, and best rookie.

Week	Overall	Offensive	Defensive	Rookie
1	Craig Conn	Craig Conn	Gee Nash	Pat Dutton
2	Dan Dawson	Dan Dawson	Dallas Eliuk	Ryan Boyle
3	Blaine Manning	Blaine Manning	Mike Miron	Riley Kemp
4	John Grant, Jr.	John Grant, Jr.	Matt Disher	Ryan Boyle
5	John Tavares	John Tavares	Pat O'Toole	Delby Powless
6	Dan Dawson	Dan Dawson	Dallas Eliuk	Kevin Fines
7	John Tavares	John Grant, Jr.	Bob Watson	Ryder Bateman
8	John Grant, Jr.	John Grant, Jr.	Steve Dietrich	Andrew Burkholder
9	Keith Cromwell	Keith Cromwell	Dallas Eliuk	Andrew Burkholder
10	Mark Steenhuis	Gary Gait	Dallas Eliuk	Dan Finck
11	John Tavares	John Tavares	Curtis Palidwor	Ryan McNish
12	Pat Campbell	Aaron Wilson	Pat Campbell	Dan Finck
13	Casey Powell	Colin Doyle	Bob Watson	Rory Glaves
14	Matt Roik	Colin Doyle	Matt Roik	Delby Powless
15	Blaine Manning	Blaine Manning	Steve Dietrich	Andrew Burkholder
16	Tracey Kelusky	Tracey Kelusky	Nick Patterson	Ryder Bateman

=== Monthly awards ===
Awards are also given out monthly for the best overall player and best rookie.

Month	Overall	Rookie
Jan	John Tavares	Ryan Boyle
Feb	John Grant, Jr.	Andrew Burkholder
Mar	John Tavares; Bob Watson (tie)	Ryan Boyle

== Statistics leaders ==
Bold numbers indicate new single-season records. Italics indicate tied single-season records.

Stat	Player	Team	Number
Goals	John Grant, Jr.	Rochester	49
Assists	Josh Sanderson	Toronto	**71**
Points	Colin Doyle	Toronto	111
Penalty Minutes	Jesse Phillips	Calgary	69
Shots on Goal	John Grant, Jr.	Rochester	193
Loose Balls	Jim Veltman	Toronto	193
Save Pct	Steve Dietrich	Buffalo	78.9
GAA	Steve Dietrich	Buffalo	10.96

== Attendance ==
=== Regular season ===
Home team	Home games	Average attendance	Total attendance
Toronto Rock	8	17,123	136,987
Colorado Mammoth	8	17,035	136,286
Philadelphia Wings	8	11,696	93,568
Minnesota Swarm	8	10,315	82,523
Buffalo Bandits	8	10,288	82,306
Calgary Roughnecks	8	10,207	81,660
Rochester Knighthawks	8	8,866	70,930
Arizona Sting	8	6,568	52,544
San Jose Stealth	8	5,435	43,481
Anaheim Storm	8	4,829	38,635
**League**	**80**	**10,236**	**818,920**

=== Playoffs ===
Home team	Home games	Average attendance	Total attendance
Toronto Rock	2	18,360	36,721
Calgary Roughnecks	1	11,468	11,468
Buffalo Bandits	1	10,014	10,014
Arizona Sting	1	5,549	5,549
**League**	**5**	**12,750**	**63,752**

== See also ==
- 2005 in sports
