= Peter Lough =

Canadian lacrosse player (born 1975)

Personal information
- Nickname(s): The Punisher & Locker
- Nationality: Canadian
- Born: January 4, 1975 (age 51) Toronto, Ontario
- Height: 6 ft 3 in (191 cm)
- Weight: 220 lb (100 kg; 15 st 10 lb)

Sport
- Position: Defense
- NLL draft: 60th overall, 1998; Ontario Raiders
- NLL team Former teams: Toronto Rock; Arizona Sting; Columbus Landsharks; Montreal Express
- Pro career: 2002–2009

Peter Lough (born January 4, 1975, in Toronto, Ontario) is a former lacrosse player in the National Lacrosse League. In his eight-year NLL career, Lough played for the Montreal Express, Columbus Landsharks, Arizona Sting, and Toronto Rock.

== Professional career ==
Lough was originally drafted in the National Lacrosse League by the now defunct Ontario Raiders, though he did not play for them. For the 2002 season he was signed by the Montreal Express as a free agent. The Express folded prior to the 2003 Season, and in the resulting dispersal draft, Lough was acquired by the Columbus Landsharks (later the Arizona Sting) in the 1st round (3rd overall).

In 2004, Lough was co-winner of the NLL Sportsmanship award, and has made All-Star Game appearances in 2005, 2006, 2007 and 2008.

After the 2007 season, Lough became an unrestricted free agent and signed a two-year contract with the Toronto Rock.

Lough has played with the Brooklin Redmen of the Ontario Lacrosse Association, the Peterborough Lakers (2006 Mann Cup Champions) and played in the 2004 Heritage Cup for Team Canada. In 2007 he represented Canada, in Halifax, at the World Indoor Lacrosse Championships.

== Hockey career ==
In addition, Lough played four years of hockey for Brock University, one year with the Canadian National Team and the Rochester Americans of the American Hockey League.

== Statistics ==
=== NLL ===
Peter Lough		Regular season									Playoffs								
Season	Team	GP	G	A	Pts	LB	PIM	Pts/GP	LB/GP	PIM/GP	GP	G	A	Pts	LB	PIM	Pts/GP	LB/GP	PIM/GP
2002	Montreal Express	16	12	14	26	105	16	1.63	6.56	1.00	–	–	–	–	–	–	–	–	–
2003	Columbus Landsharks	16	4	11	15	137	23	0.94	8.56	1.44	–	–	–	–	–	–	–	–	–
2004	Arizona Sting	16	9	6	15	92	10	0.94	5.75	0.63	–	–	–	–	–	–	–	–	–
2005	Arizona Sting	16	9	8	17	97	10	1.06	6.06	0.63	3	1	5	6	17	0	2.00	5.67	0.00
2006	Arizona Sting	16	5	12	17	104	6	1.06	6.50	0.38	2	0	0	0	12	2	0.00	6.00	1.00
2007	Arizona Sting	16	0	8	8	118	47	0.50	7.38	2.94	3	0	1	1	15	0	0.33	5.00	0.00
2008	Toronto Rock	16	3	9	12	126	21	0.75	7.88	1.31	–	–	–	–	–	–	–	–	–
2009	Toronto Rock	15	2	9	11	88	18	0.73	5.87	1.20	–	–	–	–	–	–	–	–	–
		127	44	77	121	867	151	0.95	6.83	1.19	8	1	6	7	44	2	0.88	5.50	0.25
Career Total:		135	45	83	128	911	153	0.95	6.75	1.13									

GP–Games played; G–Goals; A–Assists; Pts–Points; LB–Loose balls; PIM–Penalty minutes; Pts/GP–Points per games played; LB/GP–Loose balls per games played; PIM/GP–Penalty minutes per games played.

== Awards ==
Preceded by Chris Driscoll	NLL Sportsmanship Award; 2004 (tie with Gary Gait)	Succeeded by Gary Gait
