= Chris Driscoll =

Canadian lacrosse player (born 1971)

Personal information
- Nickname: The Pistol
- Born: September 12, 1971 (age 54) Fergus, Ontario, Canada
- Height: 6 ft 0 in (183 cm)
- Weight: 190 lb (86 kg; 13 st 8 lb)

Sport
- Position: Defenseman
- Shoots: Right
- NLL teams: Rochester Knighthawks; Toronto Rock; New York Saints; Buffalo Bandits; Detroit Turbos
- Pro career: 1993–2011

Chris Driscoll (born September 12, 1971) is a Canadian retired lacrosse player.

== Professional career ==
Born in Fergus, Ontario, Driscoll began his career with the Detroit Turbos in 1993. He played with the Turbos for two seasons before they disbanded, and was claimed by Rochester in the resulting dispersal draft. Driscoll played four seasons in Rochester and during the 1999 season, he was traded to the Buffalo Bandits. Driscoll played the rest of that season plus two more in Buffalo, before being traded to the New York Saints in a seven-player deal. Driscoll played parts of two seasons with the Saints before being traded yet again, this time to the Toronto Rock for defenseman Scott Stapleford and three draft picks.

Driscoll was given the National Lacrosse League Sportsmanship Award in 2003, and won an NLL championship with the Rock in 2005.

In November 2008, Driscoll was named captain of the Toronto Rock, replacing the retired Jim Veltman. Driscoll became only the second team captain in Rock history.

On July 31, 2009, Driscoll was traded to the Buffalo Bandits in exchange for defenseman Phil Sanderson.

He was left off the Knighthawks' 2012 active roster, but will fill a role as Ontario Scout for the team.

== Statistics ==
=== NLL ===
Chris Driscoll		Regular season									Playoffs								
Season	Team	GP	G	A	Pts	LB	PIM	Pts/GP	LB/GP	PIM/GP	GP	G	A	Pts	LB	PIM	Pts/GP	LB/GP	PIM/GP
1993	Detroit Turbos	8	8	12	20	28	2	2.50	3.50	0.25	1	0	0	0	2	0	0.00	2.00	0.00
1994	Detroit Turbos	7	7	13	20	24	2	2.86	3.43	0.29	1	2	0	2	4	2	2.00	4.00	2.00
1995	Rochester Knighthawks	8	15	20	35	37	8	4.38	4.63	1.00	2	1	7	8	8	2	4.00	4.00	1.00
1996	Rochester Knighthawks	10	18	24	42	48	18	4.20	4.80	1.80	1	0	3	3	3	0	3.00	3.00	0.00
1997	Rochester Knighthawks	10	24	25	49	52	19	4.90	5.20	1.90	2	4	6	10	7	4	5.00	3.50	2.00
1998	Rochester Knighthawks	5	9	12	21	13	8	4.20	2.60	1.60	1	0	0	0	2	0	0.00	2.00	0.00
1999	Rochester Knighthawks	9	6	27	33	29	12	3.67	3.22	1.33	–	–	–	–	–	–	–	–	–
1999	Buffalo Bandits	2	3	6	9	17	0	4.50	8.50	0.00	–	–	–	–	–	–	–	–	–
2000	Buffalo Bandits	9	12	23	35	46	6	3.89	5.11	0.67	–	–	–	–	–	–	–	–	–
2001	Buffalo Bandits	12	18	22	40	46	8	3.33	3.83	0.67	–	–	–	–	–	–	–	–	–
2002	Buffalo Bandits	10	14	31	45	43	4	4.50	4.30	0.40	–	–	–	–	–	–	–	–	–
2002	New York Saints	5	11	13	24	25	2	4.80	5.00	0.40	–	–	–	–	–	–	–	–	–
2003	New York Saints	12	30	46	76	68	0	6.33	5.67	0.00	–	–	–	–	–	–	–	–	–
2003	Toronto Rock	3	0	5	5	6	0	1.67	2.00	0.00	2	3	4	7	9	6	3.50	4.50	3.00
2004	Toronto Rock	16	15	19	34	64	21	2.13	4.00	1.31	1	0	1	1	4	0	1.00	4.00	0.00
2005	Toronto Rock	16	13	13	26	91	33	1.63	5.69	2.06	2	1	1	2	19	0	1.00	9.50	0.00
2006	Toronto Rock	13	5	10	15	40	10	1.15	3.08	0.77	1	1	0	1	4	4	1.00	4.00	4.00
2007	Toronto Rock	16	12	16	28	91	14	1.75	5.69	0.88	1	0	0	0	5	0	0.00	5.00	0.00
2008	Toronto Rock	15	6	10	16	77	10	1.07	5.13	0.67	–	–	–	–	–	–	–	–	–
2009	Toronto Rock	16	7	15	22	104	20	1.38	6.50	1.25	–	–	–	–	–	–	–	–	–
2010	Buffalo Bandits	4	2	3	5	10	2	1.25	2.50	0.50	–	–	–	–	–	–	–	–	–
2010	Rochester Knighthawks	11	1	6	7	32	6	0.64	2.91	0.55	–	–	–	–	–	–	–	–	–
2011	Rochester Knighthawks	16	4	7	11	44	6	0.69	2.75	0.38	1	0	0	0	3	2	0.00	3.00	2.00
		233	240	378	618	1,035	211	2.65	4.44	0.91	16	12	22	34	70	20	2.13	4.38	1.25
Career Total:		249	252	400	652	1,105	231	2.62	4.44	0.93									

GP–Games played; G–Goals; A–Assists; Pts–Points; LB–Loose balls; PIM–Penalty minutes; Pts/GP–Points per games played; LB/GP–Loose balls per games played; PIM/GP–Penalty minutes per games played.

== Awards ==
Preceded by Jim Veltman	NLL Sportsmanship Award; 2003	Succeeded by Gary Gait, Peter Lough
Preceded by Jim Veltman	Toronto Rock captain 2009 season	Succeeded by Colin Doyle
