= Pat Campbell (lacrosse) =

Canadian lacrosse player

Personal information
- Nickname: Paddy
- Born: April 28, 1977 (age 49) Hamilton, Ontario, Canada
- Height: 6 ft 1 in (185 cm)
- Weight: 200 lb (91 kg; 14 st 4 lb)

Sport
- Position: Goalie
- Shoots: Left
- NLL teams: Toronto Rock; Columbus Landsharks; Rochester Knighthawks; Calgary Roughnecks; Edmonton Rush
- Pro career: 1999–2012

Pat Campbell (born April 28, 1977) is a Canadian former professional indoor lacrosse goaltender who played for the Toronto Rock, Columbus Landsharks, Rochester Knighthawks, Calgary Roughnecks, and Edmonton Rush in the National Lacrosse League. In his NLL career, he won the Champion's Cup three times with the Rock (1999, 2000, 2011) and once with the Roughnecks (2009). He was also the goalie for Brock University and won four straight Canadian University Field Lacrosse Association championships.

Campbell, who graduated from Brock University studied computer programming at Niagara College, launched a first-person lacrosse video game called Shooter Lacrosse for the iOS platform on March 3, 2012.
