= Ryder Bateman =

Canadian lacrosse player

Personal information
- Born: February 18, 1980 (age 45) Calgary, Alberta, Canada
- Height: 6 ft 0 in (183 cm)
- Weight: 190 lb (86 kg; 13 st 8 lb)

Sport
- Position: Forward
- Shoots: Right
- NLL draft: 6th overall, 2004; Minnesota Swarm
- NLL team Former teams: Portland LumberJax; Minnesota Swarm
- Pro career: 2005–2007

Ryder Bateman (born February 18, 1980, in Calgary, Alberta) was a professional lacrosse player. He played for the Portland LumberJax of the National Lacrosse League and the Victoria Shamrocks of the Western Lacrosse Association. In 2005 Bateman made his debut in the NLL, playing for the Minnesota Swarm. Bateman finished the season tied for second among rookies in goals (20), and third in scoring (39 pts). He made te All Rookie team. In 2006, Bateman was traded to the Portland LumberJax roster mid season, where he helped the expansion franchise clinch the regular season Western Division Title. He played college lacrosse for the Whittier College Poets in Los Angeles.

== Statistics ==
=== NLL ===
		Regular Season						Playoffs
Season	Team	GP	G	A	Pts	LB	PIM	GP	G	A	Pts	LB	PIM
2005	Minnesota	14	20	19	39	56	20	--	--	--	--	--	--
2006	Portland	12	9	9	18	52	19	1	0	2	2	3	0
2007	Portland	15	9	15	24	43	50	--	--	--	--	--	--
NLL totals		41	38	43	81	95	81	0	2	2	3	0	0
