= John Mouradian =

Canadian lacrosse coach

Personal information
- Nationality: Canadian
- Born: August 17, 1952 (age 73) St. Catharines, Ontario, Canada

Sport
- Position: Head Coach and General Manager
- NLL team Former teams: Philadelphia Wings (2011 to 2013); Buffalo Bandits (1992 to 1997); Toronto Rock (1999 to 2009); San Jose Stealth (2003 to 2009); Washington Stealth (2009 to 2010)

Career highlights
- 9x NLL champion (1992, 1993, 1996, 1999, 2000, 2002, 2003, 2005, 2010); NLL GM of the Year Award (2004)

John Mouradian (born August 17, 1952) is a Canadian lacrosse coach and executive.

== National Lacrosse League (NLL) ==
Johnny "Gypsy" Mouradian holds 9 NLL Championships in a variety of roles with NLL organizations. He is the only general manager to win five championships.

Mouradian's National Lacrosse League experience as a General Manager (GM) dates back to 1992 with the expansion Buffalo Bandits. In 1992, the team that he built won the NLL Champions Cup in its inaugural season. Under his management, Buffalo set records for winning that remain intact today, including the longest winning streak (22 games) and the only team to go undefeated through the entire season in league history (10–0 in 1993), winning their second Champions Cup and their third in 1996. During his tenure as General Manager, Buffalo reached the playoffs in all six seasons (1992–1997).

From 1999 to 2009, Mouradian was a partner with the Toronto Rock and Vice President/GM for the 1999 and 2000 championship seasons. The Toronto Rock won the NLL Champions Cup in 1999, 2000, 2002, 2003, and 2005.

From 2003 to 2009, Mouradian spent six seasons in various roles as GM/Head Coach, GM/Assistant Coach, Managing Director/GM, and President/GM of the San Jose Stealth. He served as an advisor to the Washington Stealth, winning the 2010 championship.

In early 2010, Mouradian acted as a consultant for the Philadelphia Wings to develop a new lacrosse infrastructure, including coordinating and mentoring the coaching staff. He provided guidance and input in the development of team strategy. Later that year, he was named GM of the team.

After serving as General Manager for the Philadelphia Wings, Mouradian was named the GM/Head Coach on July 25, 2011, after former coach John Tucker stepped down. After the 2013 season, he stepped down as Head Coach, but remained GM.

=== NLL head coaching statistics ===
Team	Season	Regular Season				Playoffs				Playoff result
Team	Season	GC	W	L	W%	GC	W	L	W%	Playoff result
San Jose Stealth	2004	16	11	5	.688	1	0	1	.000	Lost Division Semifinal (CGY)
San Jose Stealth	2005	16	4	12	.250	–	–	–	–	Did not qualify
Philadelphia Wings	2012	16	7	9	.438	1	0	1	.000	Lost Division Semifinal (ROC)
Philadelphia Wings	2013	16	7	9	.438	1	0	1	.000	Lost Division Semifinal (ROC)
Totals:	4	64	29	33	.468	3	0	3	.000	

== Canadian Lacrosse Association (CLA) and the National Team ==
Field

Mouradian was on the coaching staff for 4 Canadian National Field Lacrosse Teams that participated at the World Championships; 1982 Baltimore, 1986 Toronto, 1990 Perth, and 1998 Baltimore. He was the GM of the team that won the silver medal at the World Field Championships in Manchester, England, in July 2010.

Indoor/Box Lacrosse

Mouradian was GM of the Canadian National Indoor Lacrosse Team that won the inaugural World Indoor Championship in 2003 and Chairman of the Canadian National Indoor Team that won in the 2007 championship. He was the GM of the 2011 team that won the championship in Prague.

In 2011, Mouradian was named the CLA's National Team Director for Box. He oversaw the national team program staff, guided the player identification and selection process, monitored team members, and planned for their respective discipline in conjunction with the National Team Chair and CLA VP International Competition. Under his leadership, in 2015, Canada beat the Iroquois National team 12–8 to win the gold at the World Indoor Championship (Syracuse, NY). To date, the indoor team has never lost a world championship.

In 2017, Mouradian and three other team program leaders resigned from the CLA.

== Education ==
Mouradian earned his Bachelor of Science Degree and Masters of Science Degree from Ithaca College.

== Playing career ==
Mouradian played on the Junior A St. Catharines team from 1970 to 1973. While attending Ithaca College, he played both hockey and field lacrosse. At Ithaca, he excelled at the field game as a captain and All-star attack man. In 1974, he was one of only three Canadians playing field lacrosse in the United States.

Mouradian played on the Canadian National Field Lacrosse Team, winning the bronze in the 1974 World Championship in Melbourne, Australia, and the 1978 team that won the gold in Manchester, England. After returning, he played Major [box] Lacrosse for Brampton, Brandford, and St. Catherines until 1985. He also played with Niagara and Oshawa Blue Knights Field Clubs through the 1980s, winning four Ontario Championships.

== Hall of Fame Inductions ==
1. 1998 Ontario Lacrosse Hall of Fame
2. 2000 Ithaca College Sports Hall of Fame
3. 2001 Canadian Lacrosse Hall of Fame (as a member of the 1978 national team that won the World Field Championships in England)
4. 2003 Lakeport High School Hall of Fame
5. 2008 National Lacrosse League Hall of Fame
6. 2009 St. Catharines, Ontario Sports Hall of Fame
7. 2009 Canadian Lacrosse Hall of Fame (in the Field Player Category)

== Awards ==
1. 1992: St. Catherines' Lacrosse "Player of the Decade" for the '70s
2. 2003: GM of the Year for the National Lacrosse League
3. 2012: Queen Elizabeth II Diamond Jubilee medal
4. 2014: World Lacrosse Development Award
5. Spirit of Lacrosse Award

In 2008, the Ontario Senior Men's Field Lacrosse League established The Johnny Mouradian Award, awarded to the Offensive Player of the Year.
