= Matt Disher =

Canadian lacrosse player

Personal information
- Born: July 10, 1976 (age 49) Hagersville, Ontario, Canada
- Height: 6 ft 3 in (191 cm)
- Weight: 240 lb (110 kg; 17 st 2 lb)

Sport
- Position: Goaltender
- Shoots: Left
- NLL draft: 7th overall, 1998; Buffalo Bandits
- NLL team Former teams: Edmonton Rush; Portland LumberJax; Minnesota Swarm; Anaheim Storm; Ottawa Rebel; Buffalo Bandits
- Pro career: 1999–

Matt Disher (born July 10, 1976, in Hagersville, Ontario, grew up in Arthur, Ontario) is a goaltender for the Edmonton Rush in the National Lacrosse League. Disher has been named NLL Player of the Week four times, defensive player of the week three times, and was named Rookie of the Month in February 1999.He was known for being the last player or goalie to wear the traditional style of field lacrosse helmet.

During the 2009 NLL season, he was named a starter to the All-Star Game.

== Statistics ==
=== NLL ===
		Regular Season						Playoffs
Season	Team	GP	Min	GA	Sv	GAA	Sv %	GP	Min	GA	Sv	GAA	Sv %
1999	Buffalo	6	331	85	257	15.41	75.15%	--	--	--	--	--	--
2000	Buffalo	11	558	151	381	16.24	71.62%	1	14	7	5	30.00	41.67%
2001	Ottawa	3	180	42	118	14.00	73.75%	--	--	--	--	--	--
2002	Ottawa	16	577	151	412	15.70	73.18%	--	--	--	--	--	--
2003	Ottawa	16	759	156	504	12.33	76.36%	--	--	--	--	--	--
2004	Anaheim	16	674	149	426	13.26	74.09%	--	--	--	--	--	--
2005	Minnesota	14	788	189	512	14.39	73.04%	--	--	--	--	--	--
2006	Minnesota	16	429	80	266	11.19	76.88%	1	40	6	31	9.00	83.78%
2007	Minnesota	16	301	87	169	17.34	66.02%	1	0	0	0	0	0.00%
2008	Edmonton	9	216	41	126	11.39	75.45%	--	--	--	--	--	--
2008	Portland	4	244	44	163	10.82	78.74%	3	132	33	80	14.98	70.80%
2009	Portland	13	733	132	502	10.80	79.18%	1	15	6	9	24.00	60.00%
2010	Edmonton	16	808	174	527	12.92	75.18%	2	120	19	104	9.50	84.55%
NLL totals		156	6,598	1,481	4,363	13.47	74.66%	9	321	71	229	13.27	76.33%
