= National Lacrosse League GM of the Year Award =

The General Manager of the Year Award is given annually to the National Lacrosse League general manager who has done the best job of ensuring his team's success.

== Past winners ==
Season	Winner	Team	Win #	Other finalists
2026	Brad Self	Colorado Mammoth	1	Jamie Dawick, Toronto Rock Curt Malawsky, Vancouver Warriors
2025	Derek Keenan	Saskatchewan Rush	4	Curt Malawsky, Vancouver Warriors Mike Board, Calgary Roughnecks
2024	Glenn Clark	Albany FireWolves	1	Jamie Dawick, Toronto Rock; Curt Malawsky, Vancouver Warriors
2023	Dan Carey	Rochester Knighthawks	1	Mike Board, Calgary Roughnecks; Jamie Dawick, Toronto Rock
2022	Steve Dietrich	Buffalo Bandits	3	Jamie Dawick, Toronto Rock; Bob Hamley, Panther City Lacrosse Club
2021	Season cancelled			
2020	Paul Day	Philadelphia Wings	1	Jamie Dawick, Toronto Rock; Rich Lisk, New England Black Wolves
2019	Steve Dietrich	Buffalo Bandits	2	Mike Board, Calgary Roughnecks; Patrick Merrill, San Diego Seals
2018	Curt Styres	Rochester Knighthawks	2	Mike Board, Calgary Roughnecks; Derek Keenan, Saskatchewan Rush
2017	John Arlotta	Georgia Swarm	2	Jamie Dawick, Toronto Rock; Derek Keenan, Saskatchewan Rush
2016	Steve Dietrich	Buffalo Bandits	1	John Arlotta, Georgia Swarm; Rich Lisk, New England Black Wolves
2015	Terry Sanderson	Toronto Rock	1	Steve Dietrich, Buffalo Bandits; Curt Styres, Rochester Knighthawks
2014	Derek Keenan	Edmonton Rush	3	Mike Board, Calgary Roughnecks; Curt Styres, Rochester Knighthawks
2013	Doug Locker	Washington Stealth	1	
2012	John Arlotta	Minnesota Swarm	1	
2011	Curt Styres	Rochester Knighthawks	1	
2010	Derek Keenan	Edmonton Rush	2	
2009	Ed Comeau	New York Titans	1	
2008	Marty O'Neill	Minnesota Swarm	2	
2007	Marty O'Neill	Minnesota Swarm	1	
2006	Derek Keenan	Portland LumberJax	1	
2005	Bob Hamley	Arizona Sting	1	
2004	John Mouradian	San Jose Stealth	1	
2003	Kurt Silcott	Buffalo Bandits	1	
2002	Dave Evans	Vancouver Ravens	1	
