= Craig Conn =

Canadian lacrosse player (born 1983)

Personal information
- Nationality: Canadian
- Born: November 16, 1983 (age 42) St. Catharines, Ontario
- Height: 5 ft 10 in (178 cm)
- Weight: 200 lb (91 kg; 14 st 4 lb)

Sport
- Position: Forward
- Shoots: Left
- NLL draft: 4th overall, 2003; Vancouver Ravens
- NLL teams: Washington Stealth; Calgary Roughnecks; Toronto Rock; Buffalo Bandits; Arizona Sting; Minnesota Swarm; Vancouver Ravens
- Pro career: 2004–2011

Craig Conn (born November 16, 1983, in St. Catharines, Ontario) is a former professional lacrosse player.

== High school career ==
Conn was a four-year starter at Holy Cross Catholic Secondary School in St. Catharines from 1997 to 2001. During those years, he teamed up with fellow future NLL players Matt Vinc, Billy Dee Smith and Sean Greenhalgh to win two OFSAA field lacrosse championships (1999, 2001). After Conn graduated, many St. Catharines lacrosse players would follow in Conn's footsteps and play for Holy Cross, which would help the school become a lacrosse powerhouse for years.

== College career ==
Conn played for the University of Massachusetts Amherst in 2002 and 2003. However, he would renounce his remaining two years of eligibility to enter the NLL entry draft.

== NLL career ==
Conn was originally drafted by the Vancouver Ravens in the first round (4th overall) of the 2003 NLL Entry Draft. In the 2004 season, he was 4th in team scoring with 39 points and was named to 2004 NLL All-Rookie Team. When the Ravens were removed from the 2005 schedule, a dispersal draft was held, and Conn was taken 1st overall by the Minnesota Swarm.

After only playing half a season with Minnesota, Conn was dealt at the trade deadline to the Arizona Sting for their first round draft picks in 2006 & 2007. Conn led Arizona in scoring with 19 points during their playoff run to the 2005 Championship game. Conn also helped lead Arizona to the 2007 Championship game, before losing to the Rochester Knighthawks.

Prior to the 2008 season, the Sting announced that they would not play in 2008, and another dispersal draft was held. Conn was selected by the Buffalo Bandits despite suffering a major knee injury during the summer that sidelined him for the entire 2008 season. The Sting would have retained Conn's rights if they returned in the 2009 season. However, the Sting ceased operations and another dispersal draft was held. Conn, never having played a game in a Bandits uniform, was selected fourth overall by the Toronto Rock.

After one season with the Rock, Conn was traded along with a second round draft pick to the Calgary Roughnecks in exchange for two draft picks.

Conn played for the Washington Stealth during the 2011 season and retired after the season.

== Canadian Box career ==
=== Junior ===
Conn made headlines in 1998 when he played with the St. Catharines Jr. B Spartan Warriors at only the age of 14 (the team's head coach was his father, Morris Conn). Conn played 72 games for the St. Catharines Athletics in the OLA Junior A Lacrosse League from 1999 to 2003. In 1999, he was given the Joey Nieuwendyk Award for Rookie of the Year. From 2001 to 2003, Conn lead the Athletics to three straight League championships and two Minto Cup National championships (2001, 2003). He was also a member of the 2004 Minto Cup Champion Burnaby Lakers of the British Columbia Junior A Lacrosse League. He is one of the few players in CLA history to win 3 Minto Cups in 4 years, and is only one of three players (the other being Shawn Evans and Mark Matthews) to win a Minto Cup title in two consecutive years with two different teams.

=== Senior ===
In the WLA draft, Conn was selected 2nd overall by the New Westminster Salmonbellies. During the 2007 season, Conn suffered a major knee injury while playing with the Salmonbellies during the Western Lacrosse Association's playoffs. This would cause Conn to miss the entire 2008 NLL season as well as the 2008 WLA season. Conn made his return to Senior lacrosse in 2009 with the Six Nations Chiefs of Major Series Lacrosse. Conn returned to the Salmonbellies for the 2010 season where he played in the Mann Cup, losing to the Peterborough Lakers. Conn retired from Senior lacrosse after the season.

== Statistics ==
=== NLL ===
Craig Conn		Regular season									Playoffs								
Season	Team	GP	G	A	Pts	LB	PIM	Pts/GP	LB/GP	PIM/GP	GP	G	A	Pts	LB	PIM	Pts/GP	LB/GP	PIM/GP
2004	Vancouver Ravens	13	19	20	39	60	17	3.00	4.62	1.31	–	–	–	–	–	–	–	–	–
2005	Minnesota Swarm	8	14	17	31	78	17	3.88	9.75	2.13	–	–	–	–	–	–	–	–	–
2005	Arizona Sting	5	6	5	11	33	6	2.20	6.60	1.20	3	12	7	19	13	4	6.33	4.33	1.33
2006	Arizona Sting	15	44	23	67	91	42	4.47	6.07	2.80	2	6	5	11	15	4	5.50	7.50	2.00
2007	Arizona Sting	16	21	55	76	106	35	4.75	6.63	2.19	3	7	12	19	21	4	6.33	7.00	1.33
2009	Toronto Rock	11	14	18	32	68	52	2.91	6.18	4.73	–	–	–	–	–	–	–	–	–
2010	Calgary Roughnecks	16	19	23	42	61	27	2.63	3.81	1.69	1	0	2	2	4	0	2.00	4.00	0.00
2011	Washington Stealth	14	12	21	33	57	14	2.36	4.07	1.00	3	0	0	0	8	6	0.00	2.67	2.00
		98	149	182	331	554	210	3.38	5.65	2.14	12	25	26	51	61	18	4.25	5.08	1.50
Career Total:		110	174	208	382	615	228	3.47	5.59	2.07									

GP–Games played; G–Goals; A–Assists; Pts–Points; LB–Loose balls; PIM–Penalty minutes; Pts/GP–Points per games played; LB/GP–Loose balls per games played; PIM/GP–Penalty minutes per games played.

=== Canadian Lacrosse Association ===
			Regular Season					Playoffs
Season	Team	League	GP	G	A	Pts	PIM	GP	G	A	Pts	PIM
1998	Spartan Warriors	OLA Jr B	4	4	4	8	2	0	0	0	0	0
1999	St. Catharines Athletics	OLA Jr A	17	33	21	54	50	8	8	15	23	39
2000	St. Catharines Athletics	OLA Jr A	8	7	13	20	33	14	15	24	39	31
2001	St. Catharines Athletics	OLA Jr A	15	26	30	56	61	13	22	24	46	51
Minto Cup	St. Catharines Athletics	CLA	--	--	--	--	--	6	8	7	15	27
2002	St. Catharines Athletics	OLA Jr A	10	18	16	34	81	10	17	22	39	42
Minto Cup	St. Catharines Athletics	CLA	--	--	--	--	--	6	12	8	20	13
2003	St. Catharines Athletics	OLA Jr A	4	1	4	5	74	12	29	23	52	54
Minto Cup	St. Catharines Athletics	CLA	--	--	--	--	--	6	13	16	29	--
2004	Burnaby Lakers	BC JR A	18	28	44	72	67	4	10	12	22	30
Minto Cup	Burnaby Lakers	CLA	--	--	--	--	--	5	12	9	21	22
2005	New Westminster Salmonbellies	WLA	16	21	29	50	34	6	9	15	24	4
2006	New Westminster Salmonbellies	WLA	16	29	32	61	20	10	11	13	24	30
2007	New Westminster Salmonbellies	WLA	15	22	41	63	60	1	0	0	0	0
2009	Six Nations Chiefs	MSL	14	8	13	21	18	5	8	9	17	2
2010	New Westminster Salmonbellies	WLA	10	9	17	26	10	8	9	24	33	11
Mann Cup	New Westminster Salmonbellies	CLA	--	--	--	--	--	6	4	13	17	2
Junior A Totals			72	113	128	241	366	61	101	120	221	247
Junior B Totals			4	4	4	8	2	0	0	0	0	0
Minto Cup Totals			--	--	--	--	--	18	18	30	48	0
