= Columbus Landsharks =

Former NLL professional box lacrosse team

- Sport: Box lacrosse
- Founded: 2001
- Last season: 2003
- League: National Lacrosse League
- Division: Central
- Location: Columbus, Ohio
- Arena: Nationwide Arena
- Colors: Blue, Grey, Red, White
- Head coach: Bob Hamley
- Playoff appearances: 0
- Later: Arizona Sting (2004-2008)

The Columbus Landsharks were a member of the National Lacrosse League from 2001 until 2003. They were based in Columbus, Ohio. After the 2003 season, the franchise moved to Phoenix, Arizona, becoming the Arizona Sting. This move was based on poor attendance.

The final active Landshark in the NLL was Dan Dawson, who they drafted in 2001 in the 6th round, 68th overall. He retired on June 12, 2023.

== Awards & honors ==
Year	Player	Award
2001	Tracey Kelusky	Rookie of the Year

== All time record ==
Season	Division	W-L	Finish	Home	Road	GF	GA	Coach	Playoffs
2001		3–11	8th	1–6	2–5	134	201	Marty Cooper	Missed playoffs
2002	Central	5–11	5th	2–6	3–5	198	230	Ron Roy, Wayne Colley, Chris Gallagher	Missed playoffs
2003	Central	8–8	4th	4–4	4–4	184	203	Bob Hamley	Missed playoffs
Total	3 seasons	16–30		7–16	9–14	516	634		

=== 2000-01 season ===
Game	Date	Opponent	Location	Score	OT	Attendance	Record
1	December 30, 2000	New York Saints	Nationwide Arena	L 12–17		8,123	0–1
2	January 6, 2001	@ Buffalo Bandits	HSBC Arena	L 10–23		7,328	0–2
3	January 13, 2001	Washington Power	Nationwide Arena	L 11–19		6,600	0–3
4	January 21, 2001	@ Washington Power	MCI Center	W 9–7		3,018	1–3
5	January 26, 2001	Ottawa Rebel	Nationwide Arena	W 11–10		6,183	2–3
6	February 16, 2001	Albany Attack	Nationwide Arena	L 8–15		6,940	2–4
7	February 24, 2001	@ Rochester Knighthawks (1995-2019)	Blue Cross Arena	L 6–18		8,711	2–5
8	March 2, 2001	Buffalo Bandits	Nationwide Arena	L 19–22		6,923	2–6
9	March 9, 2001	@ Albany Attack	Pepsi Arena	L 8–11		3,985	2–7
10	March 10, 2001	@ New York Saints	Nassau Coliseum	L 9–15		6,938	2–8
11	March 16, 2001	Toronto Rock	Nationwide Arena	L 5–8		5,120	2–9
12	March 31, 2001	@ Toronto Rock	Air Canada Centre	L 8–11		19,056	2–10
13	April 6, 2001	@ Ottawa Rebel	Corel Centre	W 11–8		9,325	3–10
14	April 7, 2001	Philadelphia Wings	Nationwide Arena	L 7–17		6,023	3–11

=== 2001-02 season ===
Game	Date	Opponent	Location	Score	OT	Attendance	Record
1	December 1, 2001	New Jersey Storm	Nationwide Arena	L 12–13		6,138	0–1
2	December 14, 2001	@ Calgary Roughnecks	Corel Centre	L 13–20		4,328	0–2
3	December 28, 2001	New York Saints	Nationwide Arena	L 13–17		4,235	0–3
4	January 4, 2002	@ Ottawa Rebel	Canadian Tire Centre	W 15–11		5,500	1–3
5	January 11, 2002	@ Montreal Express	Molson Centre	W 13–12		9,296	2–3
6	January 13, 2002	Washington Power	Nationwide Arena	W 19–15		3,029	3–3
7	January 19, 2002	@ Rochester Knighthawks (1995–2019)	Blue Cross Arena at the War Memorial	L 9–24		9,840	3–4
8	January 25, 2002	Vancouver Ravens	Nationwide Arena	W 12–11	OT	4,206	4–4
9	February 2, 2002	@ Buffalo Bandits	HSBC Arena	L 8–12		8,826	4–5
10	February 8, 2002	@ Albany Attack	Pepsi Arena	L 12–13		3,027	4–6
11	February 16, 2002	Buffalo Bandits	Nationwide Arena	L 10–12		3,874	4–7
12	February 23, 2002	@ Philadelphia Wings	First Union Center	W 15–14	OT	13,726	5–7
13	March 2, 2002	Montreal Express	Nationwide Arena	L 10–12		3,122	5–8
14	March 9, 2002	Albany Attack	Nationwide Arena	L 15–20		3,214	5–9
15	March 22, 2002	Rochester Knighthawks (1995–2019)	Nationwide Arena	L 13–14	OT	5,211	5–10
16	March 23, 2002	@ New Jersey Storm	Continental Airlines Arena	L 9–10		7,349	5–11

=== 2002-03 schedule ===
Game	Date	Opponent	Location	Score	OT	Attendance	Record
1	December 27, 2002	New York Saints	Nationwide Arena	W 15–10		3,022	1–0
2	January 3, 2003	Ottawa Rebel	Nationwide Arena	W 14–13		2,103	2–0
3	January 5, 2003	@ New Jersey Storm	Continental Airlines Arena	L 9–10		4,232	2–1
4	January 11, 2003	@ Buffalo Bandits	HSBC Arena	L 6–20		5,633	2–2
5	January 17, 2003	@ Albany Attack	Pepsi Arena	W 14–13		4,460	3–2
6	January 24, 2003	Calgary Roughnecks	Nationwide Arena	W 14–9		3,124	4–2
7	February 1, 2003	Buffalo Bandits	Nationwide Arena	L 16–19		3,615	4–3
8	February 7, 2003	@ Calgary Roughnecks	Pengrowth Saddledome	L 7–11		9,219	4–4
9	February 14, 2003	New Jersey Storm	Nationwide Arena	W 12–9		2,954	5–4
10	February 15, 2003	@ Rochester Knighthawks (1995-2019)	Blue Cross Arena at the War Memorial	L 5–12		9,128	5–5
11	March 1, 2003	@ Philadelphia Wings	First Union Center	L 12–13		14,035	5–6
12	March 7, 2003	Albany Attack	Nationwide Arena	L 7–11		3,298	5–7
13	March 23, 2003	Rochester Knighthawks (1995-2019)	Nationwide Arena	L 10–11		2,659	5–8
14	April 4, 2003	Vancouver Ravens	Nationwide Arena	L 7–19		4,328	5–9
15	April 5, 2003	@ New York Saints	Nassau Veterans Memorial Coliseum	W 18–13		3,124	6–9
16	April 12, 2003	@ Ottawa Rebel	Ottawa Civic Centre	W 17–12		5,289	7–9
