= New Jersey Storm =

American lacrosse team

- Sport: Box lacrosse
- Founded: 2002
- Last season: 2003
- League: National Lacrosse League
- Division: Eastern
- Location: East Rutherford, New Jersey
- Arena: Izod Center
- Colors: Blue, Grey, Black, White
- Playoff appearances: 0
- Later: Anaheim Storm (2004–2005)

The New Jersey Storm were a member of the National Lacrosse League, based in East Rutherford, New Jersey. They played from 2002 to 2003 playing at the then Continental Airlines Arena. The team was an expansion team that was purchased for by an equity investment ownership group led former NBA All-Star Jayson Williams.

After the 2003 NLL season the team was sold and relocated to Anaheim, California, becoming the Anaheim Storm under a new ownership group.

The NLL returned to the New York Metro area in 2007 with the inaugural season of the New York Titans, who would play at Madison Square Garden and Nassau Coliseum. The Titans would play for three seasons before relocating to Orlando, Florida.

== All time Record ==
Season	Division	W-L	Finish	Home	Road	GF	GA	Coach	Playoffs
2002	Eastern	5–11	4th	2–6	3–5	178	232	Jim Hinkson, Jim Brady	Missed playoffs
2003	Eastern	3–13	4th	2–6	1–7	187	220	Jim Brady, Peter Vipond	Missed playoffs
Total	2 seasons	8–24		4–12	4–12	365	452		
