= Anaheim Storm =

American lacrosse team

- Sport: Box lacrosse
- First season: 2004
- Disbanded: 2005
- League: National Lacrosse League
- Division: Western
- Team history: New Jersey Storm (2002–2003)
- Location: Anaheim, California
- Arena: Arrowhead Pond
- Colors: Blue, Grey, Black, White
- Head coach: Derek Keenan
- Playoff appearances: 0

The Anaheim Storm was a member of the National Lacrosse League. They played at the Arrowhead Pond, now the Honda Center, in Anaheim, California. They were the New Jersey Storm from the 2002 season to 2003. Starting for the 2004 season the team relocated to Anaheim, California. After the 2005 season, the Storm suspended operations due to low attendance.

The franchise was owned by NBA star Jayson Williams. Notable stars include Mark Shepherd, Casey and Ryan Powell.

== All-time record ==
| Season | Division | W-L | Finish | Home | Road | GF | GA | Coach | Playoffs |
|---|---|---|---|---|---|---|---|---|---|
| 2004 | Western | 1–15 | 6th | 1–7 | 0–8 | 171 | 227 | Peter Vipond, Pat McCabe | Missed playoffs |
| 2005 | Western | 5–11 | 5th | 2–6 | 3–5 | 170 | 197 | Derek Keenan | Missed playoffs |
| Total | 2 seasons | 6–26 | | 3–13 | 3–13 | 341 | 424 | | |
