= 2008 Colorado Mammoth season =

2008 Colorado Mammoth
- League: NLL
- Division: 2nd West
- 2008 record: 9-7
- Home record: 6-2
- Road record: 3-5
- Goals for: 184
- Goals against: 167
- General Manager: Steve Govett
- Coach: Bob McMahon
- Captain: Gavin Prout
- Arena: Pepsi Center
- Average attendance: 17,253

Team leaders
- Goals: Brian Langtry (30)
- Assists: Gavin Prout (67)
- Points: Gavin Prout (92)
- Penalties in minutes: Rich Catton (55)
- Loose Balls: Nenad Gajic (121)
- Wins: Gee Nash (7)
- Goals against average: Chris Levis (10.04)

The Colorado Mammoth are a lacrosse team based in Denver, Colorado playing in the National Lacrosse League (NLL). The 2008 season was the 22nd in franchise history and 6th as the Mammoth (previously the Washington Power, Pittsburgh Crossefire, and Baltimore Thunder).

== Regular season ==
=== Conference standings ===
East Division
P	Team	GP	W	L	PCT	GB	Home	Road	GF	GA	Diff	GF/GP	GA/GP
1	Buffalo Bandits – xyz	16	10	6	.625	0.0	7–2	3–4	203	174	+29	12.69	10.88
2	Minnesota Swarm – x	16	10	6	.625	0.0	6–2	4–4	199	196	+3	12.44	12.25
3	New York Titans – x	16	10	6	.625	0.0	5–1	5–5	197	186	+11	12.31	11.62
4	Philadelphia Wings – x	16	10	6	.625	0.0	7–1	3–5	225	220	+5	14.06	13.75
5	Rochester Knighthawks	16	8	8	.500	2.0	4–4	4–4	197	171	+26	12.31	10.69
6	Toronto Rock	16	7	9	.438	3.0	4–5	3–4	172	174	−2	10.75	10.88
7	Chicago Shamrox	16	6	10	.375	4.0	3–5	3–5	176	212	−36	11.00	13.25

West Division
P	Team	GP	W	L	PCT	GB	Home	Road	GF	GA	Diff	GF/GP	GA/GP
1	San Jose Stealth – xy	16	9	7	.562	0.0	4–4	5–3	185	172	+13	11.56	10.75
2	Colorado Mammoth – x	16	9	7	.562	0.0	6–2	3–5	184	167	+17	11.50	10.44
3	Calgary Roughnecks – x	16	7	9	.438	2.0	5–3	2–6	183	178	+5	11.44	11.12
4	Portland LumberJax – x	16	6	10	.375	3.0	3–5	3–5	179	194	−15	11.19	12.12
5	Edmonton Rush	16	4	12	.250	5.0	3–5	1–7	141	197	−56	8.81	12.31

x: Clinched playoff berth; c: Clinched playoff berth by crossing over to another division; y: Clinched division; z: Clinched best regular season record; GP: Games Played
W: Wins; L: Losses; GB: Games back; PCT: Win percentage; Home: Record at Home; Road: Record on the Road; GF: Goals scored; GA: Goals allowed
Differential: Difference between goals scored and allowed; GF/GP: Average number of goals scored per game; GA/GP: Average number of goals allowed per game

=== Game log ===
Game	Date	Opponent	Location	Score	OT	Attendance	Record
1	December 29, 2007	Calgary Roughnecks	Pepsi Center	W 10–9		17,811	1–0
2	January 12, 2008	Edmonton Rush	Pepsi Center	W 14–11		17,520	2–0
3	January 24, 2008	@ Portland LumberJax	Rose Garden	W 12–11	OT	6,322	3–0
4	January 26, 2008	San Jose Stealth	Pepsi Center	W 11–6		18,007	4–0
5	February 7, 2008	Portland LumberJax	Pepsi Center	W 15–12		15,910	5–0
6	February 15, 2008	Philadelphia Wings	Pepsi Center	L 13–15		17,109	5–1
7	February 24, 2008	@ Calgary Roughnecks	Pengrowth Saddledome	L 9–12		10,203	5–2
8	March 8, 2008	San Jose Stealth	Pepsi Center	L 8–12		18,201	5–3
9	March 14, 2008	@ Calgary Roughnecks	Pengrowth Saddledome	W 11–6		11,134	6–3
10	March 20, 2008	@ Portland LumberJax	Rose Garden	L 15–16		6,182	6–4
11	April 3, 2008	Rochester Knighthawks	Pepsi Center	W 11–8		16,860	7–4
12	April 5, 2008	@ Buffalo Bandits	HSBC Arena	L 11–12		16,905	7–5
13	April 12, 2008	@ New York Titans	Madison Square Garden	L 10–14		6,337	7–6
14	April 18, 2008	Edmonton Rush	Pepsi Center	W 15–4		18,301	8–6
15	April 19, 2008	@ Edmonton Rush	Rexall Place	W 13–8		8,142	9–6
16	April 26, 2008	@ San Jose Stealth	HP Pavilion at San Jose	L 6–11		2,916	9–7

== Playoffs ==
=== Game log ===
Game	Date	Opponent	Location	Score	OT	Attendance	Record
Division Semifinal	May 3, 2008	Calgary Roughnecks	Pepsi Center	L 13–15		15,554	0–1

== Player stats ==
=== Runners (Top 10) ===
Note: GP = Games played; G = Goals; A = Assists; Pts = Points; LB = Loose balls; PIM = Penalty minutes

Player	GP	G	A	Pts	LB	PIM
Gavin Prout	16	25	67	92	85	14
Jamie Shewchuk	15	26	38	64	69	24
Brian Langtry	14	30	33	63	58	21
Dan Carey	11	22	27	49	68	0
Jason Wulder	16	21	26	47	48	4
Jed Prossner	11	14	10	24	32	2
Nenad Gajic	16	6	18	24	121	8
Jordan Cornfield	7	7	11	18	27	2
Nick Carlson	16	8	7	15	58	23
Totals		298	482	329	1078	53

=== Goaltenders ===
Note: GP = Games played; MIN = Minutes; W = Wins; L = Losses; GA = Goals against; Sv% = Save percentage; GAA = Goals against average

Player	GP	MIN	W	L	GA	Sv%	GAA
Gee Nash	16	640:24	7	4	112	.766	10.49
Chris Levis	16	322:49	2	3	54	.789	10.04
Pete Jokisch	0	0:00	0	0	0	.000	.00
Totals			9	7	167	.773	10.44

== Awards ==
Player	Award
Gavin Prout	Second Team All-Pro
Dan Carey	All-Stars
Gavin Prout	All-Stars
Gee Nash	All-Stars
Josh Sims	All-Stars
Bruce Murray	All-Stars
Nick Carlson	All-Stars

== Transactions ==
=== Trades ===
March 25, 2008	To Colorado Mammoth Chris Gill second round pick, 2008 entry draft	To Edmonton Rush first round pick, 2008 entry draft

== Roster ==
No.		Position	Player
47	(United States)	Trans	Bloom, Jason
	(Canada)	Fwd	Brown, Matt
44	(United States)	Fwd	Carey, Dan
8	(Canada)	Trans	Carlson, Nick
48	(Canada)	Def	Catton, Rich
72	(Canada)	Fwd	Cornfield, Jordan
2	(United States)	Def	Coyle, Pat
28	(United States)	Def	Ethington, Tom
		?	Forsythe, Steve
10	(Canada)	Trans	Gajic, Nenad
11	(Canada)	Def	Gallant, John
23	(United States)	Trans	Gill, Chris
25	(Canada)	Fwd	Gill, Chris
24	(United States)	Fwd	Janson, Pat
		Goalie	Jokisch, Pete

No.		Position	Player
6	(United States)	Fwd	Langtry, Brian
	(United States)	Fwd	Law, Mike
66	(Canada)	Def	Leveque, Matt
30	(Canada)	Goalie	Levis, Chris
43	(Canada)	Fwd	Llord, Dylan
	(Canada)	Fwd	McEwen, Kyle
55	(Canada)	Trans	Moss, Jim
20	(Canada)	Def	Murray, Bruce
38	(Canada)	Goalie	Nash, Gee
1	(United States)	Fwd	Prossner, Jed
9	(United States)	Fwd	Prout, Gavin
85	(Canada)	Fwd	Shewchuk, Jamie
4	(United States)	Trans	Sims, Josh
95	(Canada)	Fwd	Wulder, Jason
		?	Zordani, Ryan

== See also ==
- 2008 NLL season
