= 2008 Philadelphia Wings season =

2008 Philadelphia Wings
- League: NLL
- Division: 4th East
- 2008 record: 10–6
- Home record: 7–1
- Road record: 3–5
- Goals for: 225
- Goals against: 220
- General Manager: Lindsay Sanderson
- Coach: Dave Huntley
- Captain: Thomas Hajek
- Alternate captains: Peter Jacobs; Jake Bergey
- Arena: Wachovia Center
- Average attendance: 11,289

Team leaders
- Goals: Athan Iannucci (71)
- Assists: Jason Crosbie (40)
- Points: Athan Iannucci (100)
- Penalties in minutes: Geoff Snider (103)
- Loose Balls: Geoff Snider (244)
- Wins: Rob Blasdell (8)
- Goals against average: Brandon Miller (12.18)

The Philadelphia Wings are a lacrosse team based in Philadelphia, Pennsylvania playing in the National Lacrosse League (NLL). The 2008 season was the 22nd in franchise history.

The Wings had not made the playoffs in five years, the longest playoff drought in the history of the franchise. But the Wings began the season 6–0, and second-year players Athan Iannucci and Geoff Snider were rewriting the record books. Iannucci broke Gary Gait's single-season scoring record in the Wings' 14th game, and ended up with 71 goals. Snider set new records for loose balls (242), penalty minutes (103), and faceoffs won (318), and won 73.8% of his faceoffs, just short of his own record of 75% set in 2007. The Wings finished 4th in the East and made the playoffs again, but were beaten in the division semi-finals by the Buffalo Bandits.

== Regular season ==
=== Conference standings ===
East Division
P	Team	GP	W	L	PCT	GB	Home	Road	GF	GA	Diff	GF/GP	GA/GP
1	Buffalo Bandits – xyz	16	10	6	.625	0.0	7–2	3–4	203	174	+29	12.69	10.88
2	Minnesota Swarm – x	16	10	6	.625	0.0	6–2	4–4	199	196	+3	12.44	12.25
3	New York Titans – x	16	10	6	.625	0.0	5–1	5–5	197	186	+11	12.31	11.62
4	Philadelphia Wings – x	16	10	6	.625	0.0	7–1	3–5	225	220	+5	14.06	13.75
5	Rochester Knighthawks	16	8	8	.500	2.0	4–4	4–4	197	171	+26	12.31	10.69
6	Toronto Rock	16	7	9	.438	3.0	4–5	3–4	172	174	−2	10.75	10.88
7	Chicago Shamrox	16	6	10	.375	4.0	3–5	3–5	176	212	−36	11.00	13.25

West Division
P	Team	GP	W	L	PCT	GB	Home	Road	GF	GA	Diff	GF/GP	GA/GP
1	San Jose Stealth – xy	16	9	7	.562	0.0	4–4	5–3	185	172	+13	11.56	10.75
2	Colorado Mammoth – x	16	9	7	.562	0.0	6–2	3–5	184	167	+17	11.50	10.44
3	Calgary Roughnecks – x	16	7	9	.438	2.0	5–3	2–6	183	178	+5	11.44	11.12
4	Portland LumberJax – x	16	6	10	.375	3.0	3–5	3–5	179	194	−15	11.19	12.12
5	Edmonton Rush	16	4	12	.250	5.0	3–5	1–7	141	197	−56	8.81	12.31

x: Clinched playoff berth; c: Clinched playoff berth by crossing over to another division; y: Clinched division; z: Clinched best regular season record; GP: Games Played
W: Wins; L: Losses; GB: Games back; PCT: Win percentage; Home: Record at Home; Road: Record on the Road; GF: Goals scored; GA: Goals allowed
Differential: Difference between goals scored and allowed; GF/GP: Average number of goals scored per game; GA/GP: Average number of goals allowed per game

=== Game log ===
Game	Date	Opponent	Location	Score	OT	Attendance	Record
1	January 12, 2008	Chicago Shamrox	Wachovia Center	W 19–11		11,974	1–0
2	January 18, 2008	Rochester Knighthawks	Wachovia Center	W 15–14		9,248	2–0
3	January 26, 2008	Buffalo Bandits	Wachovia Center	W 15–14	OT	10,542	3–0
4	February 15, 2008	@ Colorado Mammoth	Pepsi Center	W 15–13		17,109	4–0
5	February 22, 2008	Minnesota Swarm	Wachovia Center	W 17–8		10,342	5–0
6	February 29, 2008	New York Titans	Wachovia Center	W 16–12		11,419	6–0
7	March 1, 2008	@ Buffalo Bandits	HSBC Arena	L 12–21		13,720	6–1
8	March 14, 2008	San Jose Stealth	Wachovia Center	W 16–13		11,737	7–1
9	March 22, 2008	@ New York Titans	Sovereign Bank Arena-Trenton, NJ	L 13–20		5,239	7–2
10	March 29, 2008	@ Rochester Knighthawks	Blue Cross Arena	L 12–20		8,940	7–3
11	April 5, 2008	@ Chicago Shamrox	Sears Centre	L 14–15	OT	5,427	7–4
12	April 6, 2008	Toronto Rock	Wachovia Center	W 11–9		10,244	8–4
13	April 11, 2008	@ Portland LumberJax	Rose Garden	W 13–10		9,195	9–4
14	April 12, 2008	@ Minnesota Swarm	Xcel Energy Center	L 14–15	OT	12,830	9–5
15	April 19, 2008	New York Titans	Wachovia Center	L 8–11		17,340	9–6
16	April 27, 2008	@ Toronto Rock	Air Canada Centre	W 15–14		15,332	10–6

== Playoffs ==
=== Game log ===
Game	Date	Opponent	Location	Score	OT	Attendance	Record
Division Semifinal	May 2, 2008	@ Buffalo Bandits	HSBC Arena	L 12–14		9,344	0–1

== Player stats ==
=== Runners (Top 10) ===
Note: GP = Games played; G = Goals; A = Assists; Pts = Points; LB = Loose balls; PIM = Penalty minutes

Player	GP	G	A	Pts	LB	PIM
Athan Iannucci	16	71	29	100	138	35
Jake Bergey	13	29	31	60	89	8
Merrick Thomson	15	26	29	55	59	26
Geoff Snider	16	13	38	51	244	103
Jason Crosbie	16	11	40	51	80	8
Jamie Rooney	15	20	23	43	59	12
Johnny Christmas	13	5	20	25	61	10
Kyle Sweeney	16	5	20	25	127	4
AJ Shannon	9	11	7	18	35	2
Totals		324	549	440	1283	44

=== Goaltenders ===
Note: GP = Games played; MIN = Minutes; W = Wins; L = Losses; GA = Goals against; Sv% = Save percentage; GAA = Goals against average

Player	GP	MIN	W	L	GA	Sv%	GAA
Rob Blasdell	14	659:16	8	2	153	.739	13.92
Brandon Miller	7	295:28	2	4	60	.788	12.18
Jay Preece	9	6:57	0	0	3	.727	25.90
Matt Roik	0	0:00	0	0	0	.000	.00
Totals			10	6	220	.751	13.75

== Awards ==
Player	Award
Athan Iannucci	NLL Most Valuable Player
Athan Iannucci	Overall Player of the Month, January
Athan Iannucci	Overall Player of the Month, February
Athan Iannucci	Overall Player of the Month, April
Athan Iannucci	First Team All-Pro
Geoff Snider	Second Team All-Pro
Athan Iannucci	All-Stars
Geoff Snider	All-Stars
Taylor Wray	All-Stars

== Transactions ==
=== Trades ===
February 29, 2008	To Philadelphia Wings conditional third round pick, 2008 entry draft	To Edmonton Rush Brendan Thenhaus
March 5, 2008	To Philadelphia Wings AJ Shannon (from Edmonton) fourth round pick, 2008 entry draft (from Minnesota)	To Minnesota Swarm Keith Cromwell (from Philadelphia); Dan Marohl (from Philadelphia) second round pick, 2009 entry draft (from Edmonton)	To Edmonton Rush Mike Hominuck (from Minnesota) first round pick, 2008 entry draft (from Minnesota)
March 5, 2008	To Philadelphia Wings Brandon Miller second round pick, 2008 entry draft	To Chicago Shamrox Matt Roik; Brad Self first round pick, 2009 entry draft second round pick, 2010 entry draft

== Roster ==
No.		Position	Player
27	(Canada)	Def	Beisel, Brian
66	(United States)	Fwd	Bergey, Jake
31	(Canada)	Goalie	Blasdell, Rob
2	(United States)	Fwd	Borell, Jim
	(United States)	Def	Burke, Zach
1	(United States)	Trans	Christmas, John
	(United States)	Fwd	Cromwell, Keith
54	(Canada)	Fwd	Crosbie, Jason
	(United States)	Fwd	Eckerel, Matt
	(United States)	Fwd	Fiat, Kyle
	(United States)	Fwd	Ford, Conor
28	(Canada)	Def	Hajek, Thomas
25	(United States)	Fwd	Heim, Patrick
23	(Canada)	Fwd	Iannucci, Athan
24	(United States)	Def	Jacobs, Peter
	(United States)	Fwd	Marohl, Dan
36	(Canada)	Goalie	Miller, Brandon

No.		Position	Player
22	(Canada)	Fwd	Mitchell, David
	(United States)	Fwd	Morley, Marc
15	(United States)	Fwd	Moyer, Brett
34	(United States)	Def	Nadelen, Shawn
30	(Canada)	Goalie	Preece, Jay
	(Canada)	Goalie	Roik, Matt
14	(Canada)	Fwd	Rooney, Jamie
88	(Canada)	Fwd	Shannon, AJ
4	(Canada)	Trans	Snider, Geoff
7	(United States)	Def	Sweeney, Kyle
	(Canada)	Fwd	Thenhaus, Brenden
9	(Canada)	Fwd	Thomson, Merrick
77	(Canada)	Fwd	Van Beek, Rob
	(Canada)	Fwd	Wailes, Kyle
26	(United States)	Fwd	Westervelt, Drew
44	(Canada)	Def	Wray, Taylor

== See also ==
- 2008 NLL season
