= 2008 Edmonton Rush season =

2008 Edmonton Rush
- League: NLL
- Division: 5th West
- 2008 record: 4-12
- Home record: 3-5
- Road record: 1-7
- Goals for: 141
- Goals against: 197
- General Manager: Bob Hamley
- Coach: Bob Hamley
- Captain: Chris McElroy
- Alternate captains: Jimmy Quinlan; Rory Glaves
- Arena: Rexall Place
- Average attendance: 8,820

Team leaders
- Goals: Jimmy Quinlan (22)
- Assists: Dan Teat (35)
- Points: Mike Hominuck (54)
- Penalties in minutes: Ian Hawksbee (47)
- Loose Balls: Ian Hawksbee (123)
- Wins: Curtis Palidwor (4)
- Goals against average: Curtis Palidwor (12.06)

The Edmonton Rush are a lacrosse team based in Edmonton playing in the National Lacrosse League (NLL). The 2008 season was the 3rd in franchise history.

== Regular season ==
=== Conference standings ===
East Division
P	Team	GP	W	L	PCT	GB	Home	Road	GF	GA	Diff	GF/GP	GA/GP
1	Buffalo Bandits – xyz	16	10	6	.625	0.0	7–2	3–4	203	174	+29	12.69	10.88
2	Minnesota Swarm – x	16	10	6	.625	0.0	6–2	4–4	199	196	+3	12.44	12.25
3	New York Titans – x	16	10	6	.625	0.0	5–1	5–5	197	186	+11	12.31	11.62
4	Philadelphia Wings – x	16	10	6	.625	0.0	7–1	3–5	225	220	+5	14.06	13.75
5	Rochester Knighthawks	16	8	8	.500	2.0	4–4	4–4	197	171	+26	12.31	10.69
6	Toronto Rock	16	7	9	.438	3.0	4–5	3–4	172	174	−2	10.75	10.88
7	Chicago Shamrox	16	6	10	.375	4.0	3–5	3–5	176	212	−36	11.00	13.25

West Division
P	Team	GP	W	L	PCT	GB	Home	Road	GF	GA	Diff	GF/GP	GA/GP
1	San Jose Stealth – xy	16	9	7	.562	0.0	4–4	5–3	185	172	+13	11.56	10.75
2	Colorado Mammoth – x	16	9	7	.562	0.0	6–2	3–5	184	167	+17	11.50	10.44
3	Calgary Roughnecks – x	16	7	9	.438	2.0	5–3	2–6	183	178	+5	11.44	11.12
4	Portland LumberJax – x	16	6	10	.375	3.0	3–5	3–5	179	194	−15	11.19	12.12
5	Edmonton Rush	16	4	12	.250	5.0	3–5	1–7	141	197	−56	8.81	12.31

x: Clinched playoff berth; c: Clinched playoff berth by crossing over to another division; y: Clinched division; z: Clinched best regular season record; GP: Games Played
W: Wins; L: Losses; GB: Games back; PCT: Win percentage; Home: Record at Home; Road: Record on the Road; GF: Goals scored; GA: Goals allowed
Differential: Difference between goals scored and allowed; GF/GP: Average number of goals scored per game; GA/GP: Average number of goals allowed per game

=== Game log ===
Game	Date	Opponent	Location	Score	OT	Attendance	Record
1	January 12, 2008	@ Colorado Mammoth	Pepsi Center	L 11–14		17,520	0–1
2	January 19, 2008	Toronto Rock	Rexall Place	L 9–14		12,107	0–2
3	January 26, 2008	@ Chicago Shamrox	Sears Centre	L 11–17		5,107	0–3
4	February 2, 2008	Portland LumberJax	Rexall Place	L 10–11		7,072	0–4
5	February 17, 2008	@ Portland LumberJax	Rose Garden	L 8–14		6,793	0–5
6	February 23, 2008	San Jose Stealth	Rexall Place	L 8–11		9,032	0–6
7	March 1, 2008	@ Portland LumberJax	Rose Garden	W 9–7		7,744	1–6
8	March 15, 2008	Rochester Knighthawks	Rexall Place	W 10–9	OT	6,711	2–6
9	March 21, 2008	@ Toronto Rock	Air Canada Centre	L 9–14		14,312	2–7
10	March 29, 2008	San Jose Stealth	Rexall Place	W 12–5		7,250	3–7
11	April 5, 2008	Calgary Roughnecks	Rexall Place	W 11–9		9,433	4–7
12	April 12, 2008	@ Calgary Roughnecks	Pengrowth Saddledome	L 7–18		12,451	4–8
13	April 13, 2008	@ San Jose Stealth	HP Pavilion at San Jose	L 6–14		1,437	4–9
14	April 18, 2008	@ Colorado Mammoth	Pepsi Center	L 4–15		18,301	4–10
15	April 19, 2008	Colorado Mammoth	Rexall Place	L 8–13		8,142	4–11
16	April 26, 2008	Calgary Roughnecks	Rexall Place	L 8–12		10,817	4–12

== Player stats ==
=== Runners (Top 10) ===
Note: GP = Games played; G = Goals; A = Assists; Pts = Points; LB = Loose balls; PIM = Penalty minutes

Player	GP	G	A	Pts	LB	PIM
Mike Hominuck	16	21	33	54	76	4
Jimmy Quinlan	16	22	31	53	76	23
Dan Teat	19	16	35	51	61	4
Dan Stroup	16	21	21	42	63	8
Mike Accursi	9	11	22	33	37	6
AJ Shannon	7	11	11	22	20	0
Ben Prepchuk	8	5	14	19	21	2
Kyle Goundrey	12	8	10	18	31	2
Chris Gill	8	12	5	17	27	10
Totals		223	364	316	1015	27

=== Goaltenders ===
Note: GP = Games played; MIN = Minutes; W = Wins; L = Losses; GA = Goals against; Sv% = Save percentage; GAA = Goals against average

Player	GP	MIN	W	L	GA	Sv%	GAA
Curtis Palidwor	16	602:06	4	8	123	.750	12.26
Matt Disher	9	216:15	0	3	42	.750	11.65
Matt King	5	141:50	0	1	27	.733	11.42
Kurtis Wagar	1	0:00	0	0	0	.000	.00
Totals			4	12	197	.743	12.31

== Awards ==
Player	Award
Mike Accursi	All-Stars
Jimmy Quinlan	All-Stars
Chris McElroy	All-Stars
Dan Stroup	All-Stars

== Transactions ==
=== Trades ===
July 18, 2007	To Edmonton Rush Ben Prepchuk (F)	To Colorado Mammoth *2nd round pick in 2007 Entry Draft - Keegan Davidson (F)
July 24, 2007	To Edmonton Rush Mike Accursi (F)	To Rochester Knighthawks 1st round pick in 2009 Entry Draft - Sid Smith (D)
July 31, 2007	To Edmonton Rush *2nd round pick in 2007 Entry Draft - Keegan Davidson (F)	To Colorado Mammoth Jason Wulder (F)
September 2, 2007	To Edmonton Rush 2nd round pick in 2007 Entry Draft - Steve Hutchins (F)	To Boston Blazers Dan Finck; *2nd round pick in 2007 Entry Draft - Keegan Davidson (F)
September 2, 2007	To Edmonton Rush 4th round pick in 2007 Entry Draft - Steve Conrad (D); **2nd round pick in 2008 Entry Draft - Steven Brooks (F)	To Philadelphia Wings 2nd round pick in 2007 Entry Draft - David Mitchell (F)
September 29, 2007	To Edmonton Rush 5th round pick in 2009 Entry Draft - Shane Lopatynski (D)	To Boston Blazers Ryan O'Connor (F)
November 5, 2007	To Edmonton Rush Matt Disher (G)	To Minnesota Swarm 1st round pick in 2007 Dispersal Draft - Andy Secore (F)
November 27, 2007	To Edmonton Rush Mike Grimes (D)	To Minnesota Swarm 4th round pick in 2008 Entry Draft - Ricky Pages (D)
November 27, 2007	To Edmonton Rush Ian Hawksbee (D)	To San Jose Stealth 1st round pick in 2008 Entry Draft - Paul Rabil (T)
January 30, 2008	To Edmonton Rush ***3rd round pick in 2008 Entry Draft - Brendan Loftus (F)	To Calgary Roughnecks Chris Seller (T)
February 29, 2008	To Edmonton Rush Brenden Thenhaus (F)	To Philadelphia Wings 3rd round pick in 2008 Entry Draft - Mike Leveille (F)
March 5, 2008	To Edmonton Rush Mike Hominuck (F); 1st round pick in 2008 Entry Draft - Jamie Floris (F)	To Minnesota Swarm A.J. Shannon; ****2nd round pick in 2009 Entry Draft - Matt Beers (D)
March 5, 2008	To Edmonton Rush Lindsay Plunkett (F)	To Chicago Shamrox Conditional 3rd round pick in 2008 Entry Draft; Conditional 3rd round pick in 2009 Entry Draft
March 25, 2008	To Edmonton Rush Matt King (G); Ian Crashley (D); *****1st round pick in 2009 Entry Draft - Joel Dalgarno (F)	To Portland LumberJax Matt Disher (G); 4th round pick in 2009 Entry Draft
March 25, 2008	To Edmonton Rush Dan Teat (F); ******2nd round pick in 2008 Entry Draft - Matt Bocklet (D); 1st round pick in 2009 Entry Draft - Corey Small (F)	To Buffalo Bandits Mike Accursi (F)
March 25, 2008	To Edmonton Rush *******1st round pick in 2008 Entry Draft - Matt Danowski (F)	To Colorado Mammoth Chris Gill (F); ********2nd round pick in 2008 Entry Draft - Cayle Ratcliff (D)

*Later traded to the Boston Blazers
**Later traded to the Chicago Shamrox
***Later traded to the Rochester Knighthawks
****Later traded to the Washington Stealth
*****Later traded to the Toronto Rock
******Later traded to the Philadelphia Wings
*******Later traded back to the Colorado Mammoth
********Later traded to the Calgary Roughnecks

=== Entry Draft ===
The 2007 NLL Entry Draft took place on September 1, 2007. The Rush made the following selections:

^{#} Denotes player who never played in the NLL regular season or playoffs

Round	Overall	Player	College/Club
2	15	Steve Hutchins (F)	Whitby, Ontario
3	34	John Lintz (D)	Coquitlam, British Columbia
4	45	Steve Conrad^{#} (D)	Clarington, Ontario
4	48	Dan Hartzell^{#} (F)	St. Andrew's College
5	62	Calvin Craig^{#} (F)	Coquitlam, British Columbia
6	76	Jordan Coffey (F)	Brampton, Ontario

== Roster ==
No.		Position	Player
	(Canada)	Fwd	Accursi, Mike
7	(Canada)	Def	Allen, Mac
6	(Canada)	Trans	Bergman, Cam
2	(Canada)	Def	Bonterre, Troy
	(Canada)	Def	Crashley, Ian
9	(Canada)	Fwd	Daly, Randy
	(Canada)	Goalie	Disher, Matt
	(Canada)	Fwd	Gill, Chris
43	(Canada)	Def	Glaves, Rory
10	(Canada)	Fwd	Goundrey, Kyle
23	(Canada)	Def	Grimes, Mike
	(Canada)	Def	Gut, Peter
17	(Canada)	Def	Hartzell, Kris
88	(United States)	Def	Hawksbee, Ian
	(Canada)	Trans	Hillier, Darren
90	(Canada)	Fwd	Hominuck, Mike
41	(United States)	Fwd	Hutchins, Steve
30	(Canada)	Goalie	King, Matt
11	(Canada)	Def	Martin, Andrew

No.		Position	Player
15	(Canada)	Trans	McElroy, Chris
36	(Canada)	Fwd	McKay, Chris
	(Canada)	Trans	Melville, Cory
	(Canada)	Fwd	Olson, Kevin
0	(Canada)	Goalie	Palidwor, Curtis
12	(Canada)	Fwd	Plunkett, Lindsay
	(Canada)	Trans	Polny, Ryan
19	(United States)	Fwd	Prepchuk, Ben
81	(Canada)	Fwd	Quinlan, Jimmy
	(Canada)	Trans	Seller, Chris
	(Canada)	Fwd	Shannon, AJ
	(Canada)	Def	Stobart, Buck
8	(Canada)	Fwd	Stroup, Dan
51	(Canada)	Fwd	Teat, Dan
16	(Canada)	Fwd	Thenhaus, Brenden
	(Canada)	Def	Turner, Andrew
	(Canada)	Goalie	Wagar, Kurtis
	(Canada)	Fwd	Wilhelm, Shaun
33	(Canada)	Def	Williams, Rob

== See also ==
- 2008 NLL season
