= 2008 Calgary Roughnecks season =

2008 Calgary Roughnecks
- League: NLL
- Division: 3rd West
- 2008 record: 7-9
- Home record: 5-3
- Road record: 2-6
- Goals for: 183
- Goals against: 178
- General Manager: Kurt Silcott
- Coach: Chris Hall; Jeff Dowling
- Captain: Tracey Kelusky
- Alternate captains: Kaleb Toth
- Arena: Pengrowth Saddledome
- Average attendance: 10,841

Team leaders
- Goals: Lewis Ratcliff (29); Josh Sanderson (29)
- Assists: Scott Ranger (39)
- Points: Scott Ranger (66)
- Penalties in minutes: Andrew McBride (46)
- Loose Balls: Bruce Codd (114)
- Wins: Pat Campbell (3); Steve Dietrich (3)
- Goals against average: Steve Dietrich (10.47)

The Calgary Roughnecks are a lacrosse team based in Calgary playing in the National Lacrosse League (NLL). The 2008 season was the 7th in franchise history. The Roughnecks finished 3rd in the West Division, making the playoffs for the sixth straight season. They defeated the Colorado Mammoth in the division semifinals, but were eliminated when they lost 16-12 to the Portland LumberJax in the division final in Calgary.

== Regular season ==
=== Conference standings ===
East Division
P	Team	GP	W	L	PCT	GB	Home	Road	GF	GA	Diff	GF/GP	GA/GP
1	Buffalo Bandits – xyz	16	10	6	.625	0.0	7–2	3–4	203	174	+29	12.69	10.88
2	Minnesota Swarm – x	16	10	6	.625	0.0	6–2	4–4	199	196	+3	12.44	12.25
3	New York Titans – x	16	10	6	.625	0.0	5–1	5–5	197	186	+11	12.31	11.62
4	Philadelphia Wings – x	16	10	6	.625	0.0	7–1	3–5	225	220	+5	14.06	13.75
5	Rochester Knighthawks	16	8	8	.500	2.0	4–4	4–4	197	171	+26	12.31	10.69
6	Toronto Rock	16	7	9	.438	3.0	4–5	3–4	172	174	−2	10.75	10.88
7	Chicago Shamrox	16	6	10	.375	4.0	3–5	3–5	176	212	−36	11.00	13.25

West Division
P	Team	GP	W	L	PCT	GB	Home	Road	GF	GA	Diff	GF/GP	GA/GP
1	San Jose Stealth – xy	16	9	7	.562	0.0	4–4	5–3	185	172	+13	11.56	10.75
2	Colorado Mammoth – x	16	9	7	.562	0.0	6–2	3–5	184	167	+17	11.50	10.44
3	Calgary Roughnecks – x	16	7	9	.438	2.0	5–3	2–6	183	178	+5	11.44	11.12
4	Portland LumberJax – x	16	6	10	.375	3.0	3–5	3–5	179	194	−15	11.19	12.12
5	Edmonton Rush	16	4	12	.250	5.0	3–5	1–7	141	197	−56	8.81	12.31

x: Clinched playoff berth; c: Clinched playoff berth by crossing over to another division; y: Clinched division; z: Clinched best regular season record; GP: Games Played
W: Wins; L: Losses; GB: Games back; PCT: Win percentage; Home: Record at Home; Road: Record on the Road; GF: Goals scored; GA: Goals allowed
Differential: Difference between goals scored and allowed; GF/GP: Average number of goals scored per game; GA/GP: Average number of goals allowed per game

=== Game log ===
Game	Date	Opponent	Location	Score	OT	Attendance	Record
1	December 29, 2008	@ Colorado Mammoth	Pepsi Center	L 9–10		17,811	0–1
2	January 12, 2008	San Jose Stealth	Pengrowth Saddledome	L 12–13	OT	12,022	0–2
3	January 25, 2008	@ San Jose Stealth	HP Pavilion at San Jose	W 16–13		3,653	1–2
4	January 26, 2008	Portland LumberJax	Pengrowth Saddledome	W 13–6		10,413	2–2
5	February 8, 2008	Buffalo Bandits	Pengrowth Saddledome	L 9–17		10,922	2–3
6	February 16, 2008	@ Rochester Knighthawks	Blue Cross Arena	L 12–15		8,871	2–4
7	February 22, 2008	@ Portland LumberJax	Rose Garden	L 9–13		7,349	2–5
8	February 24, 2008	Colorado Mammoth	Pengrowth Saddledome	W 12–9		10,203	3–5
9	March 1, 2008	@ Toronto Rock	Air Canada Centre	L 7–9		14,542	3–6
10	March 8, 2008	Portland LumberJax	Pengrowth Saddledome	W 15–12		18,737	4–6
11	March 14, 2008	Colorado Mammoth	Pengrowth Saddledome	L 6–11		11,134	4–7
12	March 22, 2008	@ San Jose Stealth	HP Pavilion at San Jose	L 12–13		3,303	4–8
13	April 5, 2008	@ Edmonton Rush	Rexall Place	L 9–11		9,433	4–9
14	April 12, 2008	Edmonton Rush	Pengrowth Saddledome	W 18–7		12,451	5–9
15	April 19, 2008	Toronto Rock	Pengrowth Saddledome	W 12–11	OT	11,808	6–9
16	April 26, 2008	@ Edmonton Rush	Rexall Place	W 12–8		10,817	7–9

== Playoffs ==
=== Game log ===
Game	Date	Opponent	Location	Score	OT	Attendance	Record
Division Semifinal	May 3, 2008	@ Colorado Mammoth	Pepsi Center	W 15–13		15,554	1–0
Division Final	May 10, 2008	Portland LumberJax	Pengrowth Saddledome	L 12–16		9,327	1–1

== Player stats ==
=== Runners (Top 10) ===
Note: GP = Games played; G = Goals; A = Assists; Pts = Points; LB = Loose balls; PIM = Penalty minutes

Player	GP	G	A	Pts	LB	PIM
Scott Ranger	16	27	39	66	55	7
Lewis Ratcliff	12	29	35	64	65	8
Josh Sanderson	15	29	35	64	80	6
Kaleb Toth	15	19	31	50	57	4
Curt Malawsky	15	22	22	44	52	6
Jeff Shattler	16	17	26	43	110	12
Kelly Hall	14	11	25	36	36	10
Tracey Kelusky	7	11	14	25	26	5
Nolan Heavenor	16	14	9	23	92	14
Totals		268	451	290	1046	35

=== Goaltenders ===
Note: GP = Games played; MIN = Minutes; W = Wins; L = Losses; GA = Goals against; Sv% = Save percentage; GAA = Goals against average

Player	GP	MIN	W	L	GA	Sv%	GAA
Pat Campbell	11	477:21	3	6	87	.760	10.94
Steve Dietrich	9	332:24	3	2	58	.765	10.47
Ryan Avery	11	150:01	1	1	30	.760	12.00
Alex Coutts	1	3:55	0	0	1	.667	15.32
Totals			7	9	178	.759	11.13

== Awards ==
Player	Award
Lewis Ratcliff	All-Stars
Jeff Shattler	All-Stars
Andrew McBride	All-Stars

=== Trades ===
January 30, 2008	To Calgary Roughnecks Chris Seller	To Edmonton Rush third round pick, 2008 entry draft
March 25, 2008	To Calgary Roughnecks Josh Sanderson first round pick, 2008 entry draft	To Toronto Rock Lewis Ratcliff conditional first or second round pick, 2009 entry draft

== Roster ==
2008 Calgary Roughnecks roster
Active (21-man) roster		Inactive roster	Coaches
Goaltenders: 73 (Canada) Pat Campbell; 34 (Canada) Alex Coutts; 30 (Canada) Steve Dietrich; 60 (Canada) Ryan Avery; Defensemen: 16 (Canada) Mike Carnegie; 24 (Canada) Scott Carnegie; 20 (Canada) Bruce Codd; 27 (Canada) Kyle Couling; 47 (Canada) Greg Hinman; 37 (Canada) Andrew McBride; 80 (Canada) Peter McFetridge; 11 (Canada) Ryan McNish; 6 (Canada) Kyle Neufeld	Forwards: 85 (Canada) Shawn Cable; 28 (Canada) Dane Dobbie; 7 (Canada) Kelly Hall; 17 (Canada) Tracey Kelusky (C); 22 (Canada) Curt Malawsky; 71 (Canada) Scott Ranger; 42 (Canada) Lewis Ratcliff; 19 (Canada) Josh Sanderson; 9 (Canada) Kaleb Toth; Transition: 40 (Canada) Nolan Heavenor; 14 (Canada) Jeff Moleski; 8 (Canada) Chris Seller; 77 (Canada) Jeff Shattler; 4 (Canada) Devan Wray	Practice squad: -- (Canada) Craig Gelsvik; -- (Australia) Keith Nyberg; -- (Canada) Jesse Phillips; -- (Canada) Kerry Susheski; -- (Canada) Derek Tom	Head coach {{{Head Coach}}} Legend: * Suspended list; (C) Captain; (A) Alternate captain; updated 16 June 2015; NLL Transactions

== See also ==
- 2008 NLL season
