= 2008 Minnesota Swarm season =

2008 Minnesota Swarm
- League: NLL
- 2008 record: 10-6
- Home record: 6-2
- Road record: 4-4
- Goals for: 199
- Goals against: 196
- General Manager: Marty O'Neill
- Coach: Duane Jacobs
- Captain: Ryan Cousins
- Arena: Xcel Energy Center
- Average attendance: 10,331

Team leaders
- Goals: Ryan Ward (33)
- Assists: Andy Secore (48)
- Points: Andy Secore (76)
- Penalties in minutes: Travis Hill (86)
- Loose Balls: Travis Hill (108)
- Wins: Nick Patterson (10)
- Goals against average: Nick Patterson (11.99)

The Minnesota Swarm are a lacrosse team based in Minnesota playing in the National Lacrosse League (NLL). The 2008 season was the 4th in franchise history.

== Regular season ==
=== Conference standings ===
East Division
P	Team	GP	W	L	PCT	GB	Home	Road	GF	GA	Diff	GF/GP	GA/GP
1	Buffalo Bandits – xyz	16	10	6	.625	0.0	7–2	3–4	203	174	+29	12.69	10.88
2	Minnesota Swarm – x	16	10	6	.625	0.0	6–2	4–4	199	196	+3	12.44	12.25
3	New York Titans – x	16	10	6	.625	0.0	5–1	5–5	197	186	+11	12.31	11.62
4	Philadelphia Wings – x	16	10	6	.625	0.0	7–1	3–5	225	220	+5	14.06	13.75
5	Rochester Knighthawks	16	8	8	.500	2.0	4–4	4–4	197	171	+26	12.31	10.69
6	Toronto Rock	16	7	9	.438	3.0	4–5	3–4	172	174	−2	10.75	10.88
7	Chicago Shamrox	16	6	10	.375	4.0	3–5	3–5	176	212	−36	11.00	13.25

West Division
P	Team	GP	W	L	PCT	GB	Home	Road	GF	GA	Diff	GF/GP	GA/GP
1	San Jose Stealth – xy	16	9	7	.562	0.0	4–4	5–3	185	172	+13	11.56	10.75
2	Colorado Mammoth – x	16	9	7	.562	0.0	6–2	3–5	184	167	+17	11.50	10.44
3	Calgary Roughnecks – x	16	7	9	.438	2.0	5–3	2–6	183	178	+5	11.44	11.12
4	Portland LumberJax – x	16	6	10	.375	3.0	3–5	3–5	179	194	−15	11.19	12.12
5	Edmonton Rush	16	4	12	.250	5.0	3–5	1–7	141	197	−56	8.81	12.31

x: Clinched playoff berth; c: Clinched playoff berth by crossing over to another division; y: Clinched division; z: Clinched best regular season record; GP: Games Played
W: Wins; L: Losses; GB: Games back; PCT: Win percentage; Home: Record at Home; Road: Record on the Road; GF: Goals scored; GA: Goals allowed
Differential: Difference between goals scored and allowed; GF/GP: Average number of goals scored per game; GA/GP: Average number of goals allowed per game

=== Game log ===
Game	Date	Opponent	Location	Score	OT	Attendance	Record
1	January 11, 2008	@ Toronto Rock	Air Canada Centre	W 17–16	OT	13,317	1–0
2	January 12, 2008	Toronto Rock	Xcel Energy Center	W 11–4		10,104	2–0
3	January 26, 2008	@ Rochester Knighthawks	Blue Cross Arena	W 18–17	OT	9,686	3–0
4	February 2, 2008	@ San Jose Stealth	HP Pavilion at San Jose	W 14–12		3,895	4–0
5	February 8, 2008	New York Titans	Xcel Energy Center	W 16–9		10,204	5–0
6	February 10, 2008	Portland LumberJax	Xcel Energy Center	W 14–13	OT	11,244	6–0
7	February 16, 2008	@ Buffalo Bandits	HSBC Arena	L 14–16		14,446	6–1
8	February 22, 2008	@ Philadelphia Wings	Wachovia Center	L 8–17		10,342	6–2
9	March 8, 2008	@ Buffalo Bandits	HSBC Arena	L 7–11		12,313	6–3
10	March 14, 2008	Chicago Shamrox	Xcel Energy Center	W 13–9		13,004	7–3
11	March 29, 2008	@ Chicago Shamrox	Sears Centre	L 10–15		4,036	7–4
12	April 5, 2008	New York Titans	Xcel Energy Center	W 12–9		10,854	8–4
13	April 12, 2008	Philadelphia Wings	Xcel Energy Center	W 15–14	OT	12,830	9–4
14	April 19, 2008	Rochester Knighthawks	Xcel Energy Center	L 8–11		11,568	9–5
15	April 25, 2008	Chicago Shamrox	Xcel Energy Center	L 10–12		11,439	9–6
16	April 26, 2008	@ Chicago Shamrox	Sears Centre	W 12–11		6,014	10–6

== Playoffs ==
=== Game log ===
Game	Date	Opponent	Location	Score	OT	Attendance	Record
Division Semifinal	May 3, 2008	New York Titans	Xcel Energy Center	L 8–11		11,088	0–1

== Player stats ==
=== Runners (Top 10) ===
Note: GP = Games played; G = Goals; A = Assists; Pts = Points; LB = Loose balls; PIM = Penalty minutes

Player	GP	G	A	Pts	LB	PIM
Andy Secore	14	28	48	76	59	4
Ryan Ward	16	33	36	69	56	10
Craig Point	16	27	34	61	74	8
Sean Pollock	16	24	36	60	64	26
Chad Culp	16	23	32	55	89	14
Mike Hominuck	7	5	16	21	35	2
Ryan Sharp	15	9	11	20	78	72
Dean Hill	7	9	10	19	9	0
Rory McDade	8	4	13	17	11	4
Totals		313	512	408	1132	46

=== Goaltenders ===
Note: GP = Games played; MIN = Minutes; W = Wins; L = Losses; GA = Goals against; Sv% = Save percentage; GAA = Goals against average

Player	GP	MIN	W	L	GA	Sv%	GAA
Nick Patterson	16	905:34	10	4	181	.768	11.99
Kevin Croswell	16	63:56	0	2	12	.789	11.26
Totals			10	6	196	.766	12.25

== Awards ==
Player	Award
Craig Point	Rookie of the Year
Ryan Cousins	Defensive Player of the Year
Marty O'Neill	NLL GM of the Year
Craig Point	Rookie of the Month, February
Ryan Cousins	First-Team All-Pro
Ryan Cousins	All-Stars
Nick Patterson	All-Stars
Andy Secore	All-Stars
Ryan Ward	All-Stars

== Transactions ==
=== Trades ===
March 5, 2008	To Minnesota Swarm Keith Cromwell (from Philadelphia); Dan Marohl (from Philadelphia) second round pick, 2009 entry draft (from Edmonton)	To Edmonton Rush Mike Hominuck (from Minnesota) first round pick, 2008 entry draft (from Minnesota)	To Philadelphia Wings AJ Shannon (from Edmonton) fourth round pick, 2008 entry draft (from Minnesota)
March 11, 2008	To Minnesota Swarm Ian Rubel	To Toronto Rock second round pick, 2009 entry draft

== Roster ==
No.		Position	Player
27	(United States)	Fwd	Achenbach, Colin
18	(Canada)	Def	Biers, Andrew
3	(United States)	Def	Courtney, Chris
50	(Canada)	Def	Cousins, Ryan
11	(United States)	Fwd	Cromwell, Keith
31	(Canada)	Goalie	Croswell, Kevin
19	(Canada)	Fwd	Culp, Chad
		?	Favero, Brad
		Goalie	Goodleaf, Angus
	(Canada)	Def	Halls, Darren
	(Canada)	Fwd	Hill, Dean
47	(United States)	Fwd	Hill, Travis
	(Canada)	Fwd	Hominuck, Mike
34	(Canada)	Def	Inch, Nick
		?	Jackson, Marc
	(Canada)	Def	Kemp, Riley

No.		Position	Player
7	(United States)	Fwd	Marohl, Dan
8	(Canada)	Fwd	McDade, Rory
	(United States)	Def	McLean, Ashton
		?	Milkowski, Kevin
	(Canada)	Def	Miyashita, Mark
24	(Canada)	Fwd	Norbraten, Justin
12	(Canada)	Def	Pacey, Eric
93	(Canada)	Goalie	Patterson, Nick
9	(Haudenosaunee)	Fwd	Point, Craig
17	(Canada)	Fwd	Pollock, Sean
20	(Canada)	Def	Ross, Kyle
40	(Canada)	Def	Rubel, Ian
21	(Canada)	Fwd	Secore, Andy
26	(Canada)	Trans	Sharp, Ryan
23	(Canada)	Def	Sullivan, Jon
16	(Canada)	Fwd	Talbot, Noah
44	(Canada)	Fwd	Ward, Ryan

== See also ==
- 2008 NLL season
