= 2008 New York Titans season =

2008 New York Titans
- League: NLL
- Division: 3rd East
- 2008 record: 10-6
- Home record: 5-1
- Road record: 5-5
- Goals for: 197
- Goals against: 186
- General Manager: Timothy Kelly
- Coach: Adam Mueller
- Captain: Casey Powell
- Arena: Madison Square Garden
- Average attendance: 9,660

Team leaders
- Goals: Mike McLellan (34)
- Assists: Casey Powell (54)
- Points: Casey Powell (86)
- Penalties in minutes: Patrick Merrill (61)
- Loose Balls: Jarett Park (147)
- Wins: Matt Vinc (9)
- Goals against average: Matt Vinc (11.35)

The New York Titans are a lacrosse team based in New York City playing in the National Lacrosse League (NLL). The 2008 season was the 2nd in franchise history.

The Titans improved on their 4-12 last place finish from 2007 by tying for the best record in the league, though tiebreakers meant that the Titans actually finished 3rd in the east. They beat the Minnesota Swarm in the team's first ever playoff game to advance to the division finals against the Buffalo Bandits. The Bandits' playoff experience proved too much for the young Titans, and the Bandits went on to the Championship game by defeating the Titans 19-12.

== Regular season ==
=== Conference standings ===
East Division
P	Team	GP	W	L	PCT	GB	Home	Road	GF	GA	Diff	GF/GP	GA/GP
1	Buffalo Bandits – xyz	16	10	6	.625	0.0	7–2	3–4	203	174	+29	12.69	10.88
2	Minnesota Swarm – x	16	10	6	.625	0.0	6–2	4–4	199	196	+3	12.44	12.25
3	New York Titans – x	16	10	6	.625	0.0	5–1	5–5	197	186	+11	12.31	11.62
4	Philadelphia Wings – x	16	10	6	.625	0.0	7–1	3–5	225	220	+5	14.06	13.75
5	Rochester Knighthawks	16	8	8	.500	2.0	4–4	4–4	197	171	+26	12.31	10.69
6	Toronto Rock	16	7	9	.438	3.0	4–5	3–4	172	174	−2	10.75	10.88
7	Chicago Shamrox	16	6	10	.375	4.0	3–5	3–5	176	212	−36	11.00	13.25

West Division
P	Team	GP	W	L	PCT	GB	Home	Road	GF	GA	Diff	GF/GP	GA/GP
1	San Jose Stealth – xy	16	9	7	.562	0.0	4–4	5–3	185	172	+13	11.56	10.75
2	Colorado Mammoth – x	16	9	7	.562	0.0	6–2	3–5	184	167	+17	11.50	10.44
3	Calgary Roughnecks – x	16	7	9	.438	2.0	5–3	2–6	183	178	+5	11.44	11.12
4	Portland LumberJax – x	16	6	10	.375	3.0	3–5	3–5	179	194	−15	11.19	12.12
5	Edmonton Rush	16	4	12	.250	5.0	3–5	1–7	141	197	−56	8.81	12.31

x: Clinched playoff berth; c: Clinched playoff berth by crossing over to another division; y: Clinched division; z: Clinched best regular season record; GP: Games Played
W: Wins; L: Losses; GB: Games back; PCT: Win percentage; Home: Record at Home; Road: Record on the Road; GF: Goals scored; GA: Goals allowed
Differential: Difference between goals scored and allowed; GF/GP: Average number of goals scored per game; GA/GP: Average number of goals allowed per game

=== Game log ===
Game	Date	Opponent	Location	Score	OT	Attendance	Record
1	January 12, 2008	@ Portland LumberJax	Rose Garden	W 14–11		10,893	1–0
2	January 19, 2008	@ Buffalo Bandits	HSBC Arena	L 13–17		11,878	1–1
3	January 26, 2008	@ Toronto Rock	Air Canada Centre	L 10–14		14,142	1–2
4	January 31, 2008	San Jose Stealth	Madison Square Garden	L 7–12		7,332	1–3
5	February 8, 2008	@ Minnesota Swarm	Xcel Energy Center	L 9–16		10,204	1–4
6	February 10, 2008	Buffalo Bandits	Madison Square Garden	W 10–9	OT	6,742	2–4
7	February 16, 2008	@ Chicago Shamrox	Sears Centre	W 14–9		4,427	3–4
8	February 23, 2008	@ Rochester Knighthawks	Blue Cross Arena	W 14–11		10,118	4–4
9	February 29, 2008	@ Philadelphia Wings	Wachovia Center	L 12–16		11,419	4–5
10	March 14, 2008	@ Toronto Rock	Air Canada Centre	W 14–10		14,233	5–5
11	March 22, 2008	Philadelphia Wings	Madison Square Garden	W 20–13		5,239	6–5
12	April 5, 2008	@ Minnesota Swarm	Xcel Energy Center	L 9–12		10,854	6–6
13	April 12, 2008	Colorado Mammoth	Madison Square Garden	W 14–10		6,337	7–6
14	April 18, 2008	Chicago Shamrox	Madison Square Garden	W 14–7		5,379	8–6
15	April 19, 2008	@ Philadelphia Wings	Wachovia Center	W 11–8		17,340	9–6
16	April 26, 2008	Rochester Knighthawks	Madison Square Garden	W 12–11		8,026	10–6

== Playoffs ==
=== Game log ===
Game	Date	Opponent	Location	Score	OT	Attendance	Record
Division Semifinal	May 3, 2008	@ Minnesota Swarm	Xcel Energy Center	W 11–8		11,088	1–0
Division Final	May 10, 2008	@ Buffalo Bandits	HSBC Arena	L 12–19		11,012	1–1

== Player stats ==
=== Runners (Top 10) ===
Note: GP = Games played; G = Goals; A = Assists; Pts = Points; LB = Loose balls; PIM = Penalty minutes

Player	GP	G	A	Pts	LB	PIM
Casey Powell	16	32	54	86	79	10
Pat Maddalena	15	33	52	85	66	6
Jordan Hall	16	24	45	69	109	18
Ryan Boyle	16	17	45	62	65	4
Mike McLellan	16	34	22	56	29	0
Brendan Mundorf	13	23	23	46	39	8
Jeff Ratcliffe	16	12	13	25	51	12
Jarett Park	15	5	5	10	147	24
John Orsen	16	3	7	10	126	59
Totals		301	498	359	1052	60

=== Goaltenders ===
Note: GP = Games played; MIN = Minutes; W = Wins; L = Losses; GA = Goals against; Sv% = Save percentage; GAA = Goals against average

Player	GP	MIN	W	L	GA	Sv%	GAA
Matt Vinc	16	888:06	9	5	168	.770	11.35
Erik Miller	16	74:23	1	1	17	.726	13.71
John McLellan	0	0:00	0	0	0	.000	.00
Totals			10	6	186	.765	11.63

== Awards ==
Player	Award
Adam Mueller	Les Bartley Award
Casey Powell	First Team All-Pro
Matt Vinc	First Team All-Pro
Casey Powell	All-Stars
Jarett Park	All-Stars

== Roster ==
No.		Position	Player
3	(United States)	Def	Alrich, Matt
41	(United States)	Def	Barrett, Bryan
36	(United States)	Def	Belisle, Mitch
		Def	Bigas, Jeff
14	(United States)	Fwd	Boyle, Ryan
32	(United States)	Def	Brzeski, Rich
	(United States)	Fwd	Colsey, Roy
71	(United States)	Trans	Galbraith, Keevin
44	(United States)	Trans	Hall, Jordan
5	(United States)	Def	Hanford, Jamie
	(United States)	Def	Horsey, Bobby
34	(United States)	Def	Kelly, Anthony
		Fwd	Lochte, Hunter
42	(Canada)	Fwd	Maddalena, Pat
	(Canada)	Goalie	McLellan, John
19	(United States)	Fwd	McLellan, Mike

No.		Position	Player
16	(Canada)	Def	Merrill, Patrick
21	(United States)	Goalie	Miller, Erik
2	(United States)	Fwd	Mundorf, Brendan
56		Def	Orsen, John
12	(United States)	Def	Park, Jarett
		?	Passavia, Chris
20	(United States)	Trans	Peyser, Greg
		?	Polanco, Nick
22	(United States)	Fwd	Powell, Casey
90	(United States)	Fwd	Ratcliffe, Jeff
		?	Smith, Rob
24	(Canada)	Def	Smith, Rory
		?	Spallina, Brian
47	(United States)	Def	Spano, Jeff
10	(United States)	Fwd	Tower, Brian
48	(Canada)	Goalie	Vinc, Matt
		Trans	Zash, Matt

== See also ==
- 2008 NLL season
