= 2008 Toronto Rock season =

2008 Toronto Rock
- League: NLL
- Division: 6th East
- 2008 record: 7–9
- Home record: 4–5
- Road record: 3–4
- Goals for: 172
- Goals against: 174
- General Manager: Mike Kloepfer
- Coach: Glenn Clark
- Captain: Jim Veltman
- Alternate captains: Blaine Manning; Chris Driscoll
- Arena: Air Canada Centre
- Average attendance: 14,572

Team leaders
- Goals: Lewis Ratcliff (42)
- Assists: Lewis Ratcliff (50)
- Points: Lewis Ratcliff (92)
- Penalties in minutes: Cam Woods (78)
- Loose Balls: Jim Veltman (122)
- Wins: Bob Watson (7)
- Goals against average: Bob Watson (10.34)

The Toronto Rock are a lacrosse team based in Toronto playing in the National Lacrosse League (NLL). The 2008 season was the 12th in franchise history, and 11th as the Rock.

The 2008 season almost never happened. On October 16, 2007 the league released a statement officially cancelling the season, after no agreement could be reached on a new collective bargaining agreement. However, negotiations continued, and on October 25, the league announced that a new CBA has been agreed on, and that the season would proceed. The new revised schedule was released on November 2, 2007, but only included 12 of the expected 14 teams were included. The expansion Boston Blazers and 2007 Western division champion Arizona Sting had decided for "a number of business reasons" to opt out of the 2008 season and return in 2009. Due to the short time frame between the agreement on a new CBA and the start of the season, the New York Titans were unable to secure 8 home dates for the revised schedule, and thus both the Toronto Rock and Buffalo Bandits hosted a Titans home game in their own arena.

The Rock had their second consecutive sub-.500 season, finishing 7–9, and out of the playoffs for the first time since they were the Ontario Raiders in 1998. Despite the losing season, veteran Bob Watson was named NLL Goaltender of the Year.

This was captain Jim Veltman's final season as a player; he retired after 16 seasons and joined the Rock coaching staff in 2009.

== Regular season ==
=== Conference standings ===
East Division
P	Team	GP	W	L	PCT	GB	Home	Road	GF	GA	Diff	GF/GP	GA/GP
1	Buffalo Bandits – xyz	16	10	6	.625	0.0	7–2	3–4	203	174	+29	12.69	10.88
2	Minnesota Swarm – x	16	10	6	.625	0.0	6–2	4–4	199	196	+3	12.44	12.25
3	New York Titans – x	16	10	6	.625	0.0	5–1	5–5	197	186	+11	12.31	11.62
4	Philadelphia Wings – x	16	10	6	.625	0.0	7–1	3–5	225	220	+5	14.06	13.75
5	Rochester Knighthawks	16	8	8	.500	2.0	4–4	4–4	197	171	+26	12.31	10.69
6	Toronto Rock	16	7	9	.438	3.0	4–5	3–4	172	174	−2	10.75	10.88
7	Chicago Shamrox	16	6	10	.375	4.0	3–5	3–5	176	212	−36	11.00	13.25

West Division
P	Team	GP	W	L	PCT	GB	Home	Road	GF	GA	Diff	GF/GP	GA/GP
1	San Jose Stealth – xy	16	9	7	.562	0.0	4–4	5–3	185	172	+13	11.56	10.75
2	Colorado Mammoth – x	16	9	7	.562	0.0	6–2	3–5	184	167	+17	11.50	10.44
3	Calgary Roughnecks – x	16	7	9	.438	2.0	5–3	2–6	183	178	+5	11.44	11.12
4	Portland LumberJax – x	16	6	10	.375	3.0	3–5	3–5	179	194	−15	11.19	12.12
5	Edmonton Rush	16	4	12	.250	5.0	3–5	1–7	141	197	−56	8.81	12.31

x: Clinched playoff berth; c: Clinched playoff berth by crossing over to another division; y: Clinched division; z: Clinched best regular season record; GP: Games Played
W: Wins; L: Losses; GB: Games back; PCT: Win percentage; Home: Record at Home; Road: Record on the Road; GF: Goals scored; GA: Goals allowed
Differential: Difference between goals scored and allowed; GF/GP: Average number of goals scored per game; GA/GP: Average number of goals allowed per game

=== Game log ===
Game	Date	Opponent	Location	Score	OT	Attendance	Record
1	January 5, 2008	@ Chicago Shamrox	Sears Centre	W 11–9		6,116	1–0
2	January 11, 2008	Minnesota Swarm	Air Canada Centre	L 16–17	OT	13,317	1–1
3	January 12, 2008	@ Minnesota Swarm	Xcel Energy Center	L 4–11		10,104	1–2
4	January 19, 2008	@ Edmonton Rush	Rexall Place	W 14–9		12,107	2–2
5	January 26, 2008	New York Titans	Air Canada Centre	W 14–10		14,142	3–2
6	February 9, 2008	@ Rochester Knighthawks	Blue Cross Arena	L 4–11		9,925	3–3
7	February 15, 2008	Buffalo Bandits	Air Canada Centre	W 11–8		14,611	4–3
8	March 1, 2008	Calgary Roughnecks	Air Canada Centre	W 9–7		14,542	5–3
9	March 14, 2008	New York Titans	Air Canada Centre	L 10–14		14,233	5–4
10	March 21, 2008	Edmonton Rush	Air Canada Centre	W 14–9		14,312	6–4
11	March 22, 2008	@ Buffalo Bandits	HSBC Arena	W 13–9		15,230	7–4
12	April 5, 2008	Rochester Knighthawks	Air Canada Centre	L 6–9		15,422	7–5
13	April 6, 2008	@ Philadelphia Wings	Wachovia Center	L 9–11		10,244	7–6
14	April 12, 2008	Chicago Shamrox	Air Canada Centre	L 12–13	OT	15,238	7–7
15	April 19, 2008	@ Calgary Roughnecks	Pengrowth Saddledome	L 11–12	OT	11,808	7–8
16	April 27, 2008	Philadelphia Wings	Air Canada Centre	L 14–15		15,332	7–9

== Player stats ==
=== Runners (Top 10) ===
Note: GP = Games played; G = Goals; A = Assists; Pts = Points; LB = Loose balls; PIM = Penalty minutes

Player	GP	G	A	Pts	LB	PIM
Lewis Ratcliff	17	42	50	92	91	10
Blaine Manning	16	30	44	74	90	4
Aaron Wilson	16	28	22	50	90	4
Josh Sanderson	11	23	27	50	61	6
Ryan Benesch	14	19	31	50	71	38
Kasey Beirnes	16	15	14	29	57	8
Rob Marshall	16	7	17	24	109	8
Jim Veltman	14	6	17	23	122	8
Cam Woods	14	6	12	18	81	78
Totals		257	429	349	1114	36

=== Goaltenders ===
Note: GP = Games played; MIN = Minutes; W = Wins; L = Losses; GA = Goals against; Sv% = Save percentage; GAA = Goals against average

Player	GP	MIN	W	L	GA	Sv%	GAA
Bob Watson	15	812:38	7	6	140	.786	10.34
Mike Poulin	16	153:04	0	3	32	.740	12.54
Mike Attwood	1	0:00	0	0	0	.000	.00
Totals			7	9	174	.776	10.88

== Awards ==
Player	Award
Bob Watson	NLL Goaltender of the Year
Bob Watson	First Team All-Pro
Jim Veltman	All-Stars
Peter Lough	All-Stars
Bob Watson	All-Stars

== Transactions ==
=== Trades ===
March 25, 2008	To Toronto Rock Lewis Ratcliff conditional first or second round pick, 2009 entry draft	To Calgary Roughnecks Josh Sanderson first round pick, 2008 entry draft
March 11, 2008	To Toronto Rock second round pick, 2009 entry draft	To Minnesota Swarm Ian Rubel

== Roster ==
No.		Position	Player
	(Canada)	Goalie	Mike Attwood
		?	Matt Baker
33	(Canada)	Fwd	Kasey Beirnes
21	(Canada)	Fwd	Ryan Benesch
37	(Canada)	Def	Scott Campbell
23	(Canada)	Def	Matt Carroll
93	(Canada)	Trans	Chris Driscoll
9	(Canada)	Fwd	Jon Harasym
		?	James Hinkson
6	(Canada)	Def	Dan Ladouceur
27	(Canada)	Def	Peter Lough
	(Canada)	Def	Brad MacArthur
17	(Canada)	Fwd	Mike MacLeod
16	(Canada)	Fwd	Blaine Manning
14	(Canada)	Trans	Rob Marshall
	(Canada)	Fwd	Tim O'Brien
30	(Canada)	Goalie	Mike Poulin

No.		Position	Player
42	(Canada)	Fwd	Lewis Ratcliff
		Def	Bryan Riddell
	(Canada)	Def	Ian Rubel
	(Canada)	Fwd	Josh Sanderson
	(Canada)	Fwd	Nathan Sanderson
15	(Canada)	Fwd	Mark Scherman
	(Canada)	Fwd	Matt Shearer
13	(Canada)	Def	Stewart
7	(Canada)	Def	Derek Suddons
40	(Canada)	Fwd	Jamie Taylor
94	(United States)	Fwd	Matt Taylor
	(Canada)	Def	Chad Thompson
32	(Canada)	Trans	Jim Veltman
29	(Canada)	Goalie	Bob Watson
10	(Canada)	Fwd	Aaron Wilson
20	(Canada)	Def	Jay Winder
22	(Canada)	Def	Cam Woods

== See also ==
- 2008 NLL season
