= 2008 San Jose Stealth season =

2008 San Jose Stealth
- West Division Champions
- League: NLL
- Division: 1st West
- 2008 record: 9-7
- Home record: 4-4
- Road record: 5-3
- Goals for: 185
- Goals against: 172
- General Manager: Johnny Mouradian
- Coach: Walt Christianson
- Captain: Colin Doyle
- Alternate captains: Jeff Zywicki; Shaydon Santos
- Arena: HP Pavilion at San Jose
- Average attendance: 3,019

Team leaders
- Goals: Jeff Zywicki (48)
- Assists: Colin Doyle (61)
- Points: Jeff Zywicki (90)
- Penalties in minutes: Eric Martin (71)
- Loose Balls: Eric Martin (151)
- Wins: Anthony Cosmo (7)
- Goals against average: Aaron Bold (9.04)

The San Jose Stealth are a lacrosse team based in San Jose, California. The team plays in the National Lacrosse League (NLL). The 2008 season was the 9th in franchise history and 5th as the Stealth (previously the Albany Attack).

== Regular season ==
=== Conference standings ===
East Division
P	Team	GP	W	L	PCT	GB	Home	Road	GF	GA	Diff	GF/GP	GA/GP
1	Buffalo Bandits – xyz	16	10	6	.625	0.0	7–2	3–4	203	174	+29	12.69	10.88
2	Minnesota Swarm – x	16	10	6	.625	0.0	6–2	4–4	199	196	+3	12.44	12.25
3	New York Titans – x	16	10	6	.625	0.0	5–1	5–5	197	186	+11	12.31	11.62
4	Philadelphia Wings – x	16	10	6	.625	0.0	7–1	3–5	225	220	+5	14.06	13.75
5	Rochester Knighthawks	16	8	8	.500	2.0	4–4	4–4	197	171	+26	12.31	10.69
6	Toronto Rock	16	7	9	.438	3.0	4–5	3–4	172	174	−2	10.75	10.88
7	Chicago Shamrox	16	6	10	.375	4.0	3–5	3–5	176	212	−36	11.00	13.25

West Division
P	Team	GP	W	L	PCT	GB	Home	Road	GF	GA	Diff	GF/GP	GA/GP
1	San Jose Stealth – xy	16	9	7	.562	0.0	4–4	5–3	185	172	+13	11.56	10.75
2	Colorado Mammoth – x	16	9	7	.562	0.0	6–2	3–5	184	167	+17	11.50	10.44
3	Calgary Roughnecks – x	16	7	9	.438	2.0	5–3	2–6	183	178	+5	11.44	11.12
4	Portland LumberJax – x	16	6	10	.375	3.0	3–5	3–5	179	194	−15	11.19	12.12
5	Edmonton Rush	16	4	12	.250	5.0	3–5	1–7	141	197	−56	8.81	12.31

x: Clinched playoff berth; c: Clinched playoff berth by crossing over to another division; y: Clinched division; z: Clinched best regular season record; GP: Games Played
W: Wins; L: Losses; GB: Games back; PCT: Win percentage; Home: Record at Home; Road: Record on the Road; GF: Goals scored; GA: Goals allowed
Differential: Difference between goals scored and allowed; GF/GP: Average number of goals scored per game; GA/GP: Average number of goals allowed per game

=== Game log ===
Game	Date	Opponent	Location	Score	OT	Attendance	Record
1	January 12, 2008	@ Calgary Roughnecks	Pengrowth Saddledome	W 13–12	OT	12,022	1–0
2	January 25, 2008	Calgary Roughnecks	HP Pavilion at San Jose	L 13–16		3,653	1–1
3	January 26, 2008	@ Colorado Mammoth	Pepsi Center	L 6–11		18,007	1–2
4	January 31, 2008	@ New York Titans	Madison Square Garden	W 12–7		7,332	2–2
5	February 2, 2008	Minnesota Swarm	HP Pavilion at San Jose	L 12–14		3,895	2–3
6	February 9, 2008	Chicago Shamrox	HP Pavilion at San Jose	W 17–11		2,514	3–3
7	February 23, 2008	@ Edmonton Rush	Rexall Place	W 11–8		9,032	4–3
8	March 8, 2008	@ Colorado Mammoth	Pepsi Center	W 12–8		18,201	5–3
9	March 14, 2008	@ Philadelphia Wings	Wachovia Center	L 13–16		11,737	5–4
10	March 22, 2008	Calgary Roughnecks	HP Pavilion at San Jose	W 13–12		3,303	6–4
11	March 29, 2008	@ Edmonton Rush	Rexall Place	L 5–12		7,250	6–5
12	April 5, 2008	@ Portland LumberJax	Rose Garden	W 12–9		10,359	7–5
13	April 6, 2008	Portland LumberJax	HP Pavilion at San Jose	L 10–12		3,418	7–6
14	April 13, 2008	Edmonton Rush	HP Pavilion at San Jose	W 14–6		1,437	8–6
15	April 18, 2008	Portland LumberJax	HP Pavilion at San Jose	L 11–12	OT	3,341	8–7
16	April 26, 2008	Colorado Mammoth	HP Pavilion at San Jose	W 11–6		2,916	9–7

== Playoffs ==
=== Game log ===
Game	Date	Opponent	Location	Score	OT	Attendance	Record
Division Semifinal	May 4, 2008	Portland LumberJax	HP Pavilion at San Jose	L 16–18		2,697	0–1

== Player stats ==
=== Runners (Top 10) ===
Note: GP = Games played; G = Goals; A = Assists; Pts = Points; LB = Loose balls; PIM = Penalty minutes

Player	GP	G	A	Pts	LB	PIM
Jeff Zywicki	16	48	42	90	105	4
Colin Doyle	16	27	61	88	45	12
Luke Wiles	11	20	34	54	46	6
Cam Sedgwick	15	13	39	52	60	6
Gary Rosyski	12	18	22	40	44	13
Frank Resetarits	13	17	17	34	27	7
Peter Veltman	9	7	13	20	19	7
Eric Martin	16	9	10	19	151	71
Tom Johnson	8	8	7	15	18	0
Totals		304	489	420	1002	38

=== Goaltenders ===
Note: GP = Games played; MIN = Minutes; W = Wins; L = Losses; GA = Goals against; Sv% = Save percentage; GAA = Goals against average

Player	GP	MIN	W	L	GA	Sv%	GAA
Anthony Cosmo	16	824:56	7	6	147	.795	10.69
Aaron Bold	16	139:25	2	1	21	.806	9.04
Tyler Richards	0	0:00	0	0	0	.000	.00
Totals			9	7	172	.793	10.75

== Awards ==
Player	Award
Colin Doyle	Second Team All-Pro
Jeff Zywicki	Second Team All-Pro
Jeff Zywicki	All-Stars
Eric Martin	All-Stars
Colin Doyle	All-Stars
Anthony Cosmo	All-Stars

== Roster ==
No.		Position	Player
77	(Canada)	Goalie	Bold, Aaron
3	(United States)	Trans	Booth, Tim
44	(Canada)	Goalie	Cosmo, Anthony
2	(Canada)	Def	Dawson, Paul
7	(Canada)	Fwd	Doyle, Colin
17	(United States)	Def	Fairlie, Todd
	(United States)	Fwd	Green, Wes
4	(Canada)	Def	Guindon, Andrew
	(United States)	Def	Gurenlian, Greg
41	(United States)	Def	Heffner, Zach
34	(Canada)	Fwd	Hinton, Luke
6	(Canada)	Def	Hodgson, Curtis
21	(United States)	Def	Holmes, Steve

No.		Position	Player
8	(Canada)	Fwd	Johnson, Tom
25	(United States)	Def	Martin, Eric
		Def	Megill, Ray
10	(United States)	Fwd	Morris, Sean
55	(United States)	Def	Panarelli, Steve
5	(United States)	Fwd	Resetarits, Frank
0	(Canada)	Goalie	Richards, Tyler
23	(Canada)	Fwd	Rosyski, Gary
20	(Canada)	Def	Santos, Shaydon
29	(Canada)	Fwd	Sedgwick, Cam
11	(Canada)	Def	Sorensen, Kyle
13	(Canada)	Fwd	Veltman, Peter
	(United States)	Fwd	Wiles, Luke
9	(Canada)	Fwd	Zywicki, Jeff

== See also ==
- 2008 NLL season
