= 2008 Buffalo Bandits season =

Lacrosse team season; NLL champions, fourth in team history

2008 Buffalo Bandits
- Champion's Cup Champions
- East Division Champions
- League: NLL
- Division: 1st East
- 2008 record: 10–6
- Home record: 7–2
- Road record: 3–4
- Goals for: 203
- Goals against: 174
- General Manager: Darris Kilgour
- Coach: Darris Kilgour
- Captain: Rich Kilgour
- Alternate captains: Pat McCready; John Tavares
- Arena: HSBC Arena
- Average attendance: 12,665

Team leaders
- Goals: Mark Steenhuis (34)
- Assists: John Tavares (58)
- Points: John Tavares (87)
- Penalties in minutes: Kyle Laverty (70)
- Loose Balls: Pat McCready (121)
- Wins: Mike Thompson (5)
- Goals against average: Ken Montour (10.23)

The Buffalo Bandits are a lacrosse team based in Buffalo, New York playing in the National Lacrosse League (NLL). The 2008 season was the franchise's 17th season.

The Bandits tied with Minnesota, New York, and Philadelphia with a 10–6 record, but thanks to tiebreakers, clinched first place overall and home floor advantage throughout the playoffs. They beat the Philadelphia Wings, 14–12, in the opening round of the playoffs, then made quick work of the New York Titans 19–12, before they beat the Portland LumberJax, 14–13, to win their first championship since 1996.

The Bandits would not win another NLL title until 2023.

== Regular season ==
=== Conference standings ===
East Division
P	Team	GP	W	L	PCT	GB	Home	Road	GF	GA	Diff	GF/GP	GA/GP
1	Buffalo Bandits – xyz	16	10	6	.625	0.0	7–2	3–4	203	174	+29	12.69	10.88
2	Minnesota Swarm – x	16	10	6	.625	0.0	6–2	4–4	199	196	+3	12.44	12.25
3	New York Titans – x	16	10	6	.625	0.0	5–1	5–5	197	186	+11	12.31	11.62
4	Philadelphia Wings – x	16	10	6	.625	0.0	7–1	3–5	225	220	+5	14.06	13.75
5	Rochester Knighthawks	16	8	8	.500	2.0	4–4	4–4	197	171	+26	12.31	10.69
6	Toronto Rock	16	7	9	.438	3.0	4–5	3–4	172	174	−2	10.75	10.88
7	Chicago Shamrox	16	6	10	.375	4.0	3–5	3–5	176	212	−36	11.00	13.25

West Division
P	Team	GP	W	L	PCT	GB	Home	Road	GF	GA	Diff	GF/GP	GA/GP
1	San Jose Stealth – xy	16	9	7	.562	0.0	4–4	5–3	185	172	+13	11.56	10.75
2	Colorado Mammoth – x	16	9	7	.562	0.0	6–2	3–5	184	167	+17	11.50	10.44
3	Calgary Roughnecks – x	16	7	9	.438	2.0	5–3	2–6	183	178	+5	11.44	11.12
4	Portland LumberJax – x	16	6	10	.375	3.0	3–5	3–5	179	194	−15	11.19	12.12
5	Edmonton Rush	16	4	12	.250	5.0	3–5	1–7	141	197	−56	8.81	12.31

x: Clinched playoff berth; c: Clinched playoff berth by crossing over to another division; y: Clinched division; z: Clinched best regular season record; GP: Games Played
W: Wins; L: Losses; GB: Games back; PCT: Win percentage; Home: Record at Home; Road: Record on the Road; GF: Goals scored; GA: Goals allowed
Differential: Difference between goals scored and allowed; GF/GP: Average number of goals scored per game; GA/GP: Average number of goals allowed per game

=== Game log ===
Game	Date	Opponent	Location	Score	OT	Attendance	Record
1	January 11, 2008	Rochester Knighthawks	HSBC Arena	L 9–12		18,670	0–1
2	January 12, 2008	@ Rochester Knighthawks	Blue Cross Arena	W 14–9		10,939	1–1
3	January 19, 2008	New York Titans	HSBC Arena	W 17–13		11,878	2–1
4	January 26, 2008	@ Philadelphia Wings	Wachovia Center	L 14–15	OT	10,542	2–2
5	February 8, 2008	@ Calgary Roughnecks	Pengrowth Saddledome	W 17–9		10,922	3–2
6	February 10, 2008	@ New York Titans	Madison Square Garden	L 9–10	OT	6,742	3–3
7	February 15, 2008	@ Toronto Rock	Air Canada Centre	L 8–11		14,611	3–4
8	February 16, 2008	Minnesota Swarm	HSBC Arena	W 16–14		14,446	4–4
9	February 24, 2008	@ Chicago Shamrox	Sears Centre	W 13–8		3,250	5–4
10	March 1, 2008	Philadelphia Wings	HSBC Arena	W 21–12		13,720	6–4
11	March 8, 2008	Minnesota Swarm	HSBC Arena	W 11–7		12,313	7–4
12	March 22, 2008	Toronto Rock	HSBC Arena	L 9–13		15,230	7–5
13	April 5, 2008	Colorado Mammoth	HSBC Arena	W 12–11		16,905	8–5
14	April 12, 2008	@ Rochester Knighthawks	Blue Cross Arena	L 6–11		10,517	8–6
15	April 19, 2008	Chicago Shamrox	HSBC Arena	W 13–9		13,633	9–6
16	April 26, 2008	Portland LumberJax	HSBC Arena	W 14–10		18,325	10–6

== Playoffs ==
=== Game log ===
Game	Date	Opponent	Location	Score	OT	Attendance	Record
Division Semifinal	May 2, 2008	Philadelphia Wings	HSBC Arena	W 14–12		9,344	1–0
Division Final	May 10, 2008	New York Titans	HSBC Arena	W 19–12		11,012	2–0
Championship Game	May 17, 2008	Portland LumberJax	HSBC Arena	W 14–13		18,690	3–0

== Player stats ==
=== Runners (Top 10) ===
Note: GP = Games played; G = Goals; A = Assists; Pts = Points; LB = Loose Balls; PIM = Penalty Minutes

Player	GP	G	A	Pts	LB	PIM
John Tavares	16	29	58	87	91	23
Mark Steenhuis	15	34	41	75	121	27
Delby Powless	16	18	37	55	29	10
Cory Bomberry	16	17	38	55	59	29
Roger Vyse	14	21	27	48	48	4
Kevin Dostie	10	22	14	36	34	11
Dan Teat	12	11	23	34	38	2
Pat McCready	15	8	15	23	121	44
Ian Llord	15	5	12	17	71	26
Totals		316	519	478	1047	48

=== Goaltenders ===
Note: GP = Games played; MIN = Minutes; W = Wins; L = Losses; GA = Goals against; Sv% = Save percentage; GAA = Goals against average

Player	GP	MIN	W	L	GA	Sv%	GAA
Mike Thompson	14	421:36	5	1	83	.762	11.81
Ken Montour	14	480:45	4	5	82	.808	10.23
Daniel Sams	3	60:00	1	0	8	.882	8.00
Totals			10	6	174	.794	10.88

== Awards ==
Player	Award
Mark Steenhuis	Transition Player of the Year
John Tavares	First Team All-Pro
Mark Steenhuis	First Team All-Pro
Mark Steenhuis	Championship Game MVP
John Tavares	All-Stars
Mark Steenhuis	All-Stars
Chris White	All-Stars

== Transactions ==
=== Trades ===
February 5, 2008	To Buffalo Bandits Andrew Lazore; Rusty Kruger	To Chicago Shamrox two second round picks, 2008 entry draft
March 25, 2008	To Buffalo Bandits Mike Accursi	To Edmonton Rush Dan Teat second round pick, 2008 entry draft first round pick, 2009 entry draft

== Roster ==
No.		Position	Player
44	(Canada)	Fwd	Accursi, Mike
72	(Haudenosaunee)	Fwd	Bomberry, Cory
26	(United States)	Fwd	Bucktooth, Brett
	(Canada)	Fwd	Conn, Craig
	(Canada)	?	Croswell, Brian
51	(Canada)	Fwd	Dostie, Kevin
	(Haudenosaunee)	Fwd	Francis, Brandon
	(United States)	Fwd	Greenhalgh, Sean
5	(Haudenosaunee)	Def	Hill, Clay
16	(United States)	Trans	Kilgour, Rich
20	(Canada)	Fwd	Kruger, Rusty
		?	Lalonde, Chris
17	(Canada)	Def	Laverty, Kyle
4	(Haudenosaunee)	Fwd	Lazore, Andrew
2	(Canada)	Fwd	Llord, Ian
10	(Canada)	Trans	McCready, Pat
29	(Haudenosaunee)	Goalie	Montour, Ken

No.		Position	Player
99	(United States)	Fwd	Powless, Delby
	(United States)	Def	Ragnar, Pete
	(Canada)	Goalie	Sams, Daniel
18	(Canada)	Def	Sanderson, Phil
24	(United States)	Def	Schmelzle, Kyle
3	(Canada)	Def	Smith, Billy Dee
14	(United States)	Def	Smith, Joe
	(United States)	Def	Sorci, Tony
	(Haudenosaunee)	Trans	Squire, Chad
9	(Canada)	Trans	Steenhuis, Mark
12	(United States)	Fwd	Swamp, Brandon
11	(Canada)	Fwd	Tavares, John
	(Canada)	Fwd	Teat, Dan
66	(United States)	Goalie	Thompson, Mike
	(Canada)	Fwd	Thorimbert, Jay
81	(Haudenosaunee)	Fwd	Vyse, Roger
6	(Canada)	Def	White, Chris

== See also ==
- 2008 NLL season
