= 2008 Portland LumberJax season =

2008 Portland LumberJax
- League: NLL
- Division: 4th West
- 2008 record: 6-10
- Home record: 3-5
- Road record: 3-5
- Goals for: 179
- Goals against: 194
- General Manager: Derek Keenan
- Coach: Derek Keenan
- Captain: Pat Jones
- Arena: Rose Garden Arena
- Average attendance: 9,581

Team leaders
- Goals: Dan Dawson (38)
- Assists: Dan Dawson (43); Ryan Powell (43)
- Points: Dan Dawson (81)
- Penalties in minutes: Brodie Merrill (53)
- Loose Balls: Brodie Merrill (211)
- Wins: Matt King (4)
- Goals against average: Matt Disher (10.83)

The Portland LumberJax are a lacrosse team based in Portland, Oregon playing in the National Lacrosse League (NLL). The 2008 season was the 3rd in franchise history.

After a disappointing 1-5 start and a mediocre 6-10 season, the LumberJax caught fire in the playoffs, defeating both San Jose and Calgary in their own buildings to advance to their first ever NLL Championship game in only their third season. The Jax put up a good fight, but the Buffalo Bandits defeated the Jax 14–13 to win the Champion's Cup.

== Regular season ==
=== Conference standings ===
East Division
P	Team	GP	W	L	PCT	GB	Home	Road	GF	GA	Diff	GF/GP	GA/GP
1	Buffalo Bandits – xyz	16	10	6	.625	0.0	7–2	3–4	203	174	+29	12.69	10.88
2	Minnesota Swarm – x	16	10	6	.625	0.0	6–2	4–4	199	196	+3	12.44	12.25
3	New York Titans – x	16	10	6	.625	0.0	5–1	5–5	197	186	+11	12.31	11.62
4	Philadelphia Wings – x	16	10	6	.625	0.0	7–1	3–5	225	220	+5	14.06	13.75
5	Rochester Knighthawks	16	8	8	.500	2.0	4–4	4–4	197	171	+26	12.31	10.69
6	Toronto Rock	16	7	9	.438	3.0	4–5	3–4	172	174	−2	10.75	10.88
7	Chicago Shamrox	16	6	10	.375	4.0	3–5	3–5	176	212	−36	11.00	13.25

West Division
P	Team	GP	W	L	PCT	GB	Home	Road	GF	GA	Diff	GF/GP	GA/GP
1	San Jose Stealth – xy	16	9	7	.562	0.0	4–4	5–3	185	172	+13	11.56	10.75
2	Colorado Mammoth – x	16	9	7	.562	0.0	6–2	3–5	184	167	+17	11.50	10.44
3	Calgary Roughnecks – x	16	7	9	.438	2.0	5–3	2–6	183	178	+5	11.44	11.12
4	Portland LumberJax – x	16	6	10	.375	3.0	3–5	3–5	179	194	−15	11.19	12.12
5	Edmonton Rush	16	4	12	.250	5.0	3–5	1–7	141	197	−56	8.81	12.31

x: Clinched playoff berth; c: Clinched playoff berth by crossing over to another division; y: Clinched division; z: Clinched best regular season record; GP: Games Played
W: Wins; L: Losses; GB: Games back; PCT: Win percentage; Home: Record at Home; Road: Record on the Road; GF: Goals scored; GA: Goals allowed
Differential: Difference between goals scored and allowed; GF/GP: Average number of goals scored per game; GA/GP: Average number of goals allowed per game

=== Game log ===
Game	Date	Opponent	Location	Score	OT	Attendance	Record
1	January 12, 2008	New York Titans	Rose Garden	L 11–14		10,893	0–1
2	January 24, 2008	Colorado Mammoth	Rose Garden	L 11–12	OT	6,322	0–2
3	January 26, 2008	@ Calgary Roughnecks	Pengrowth Saddledome	L 6–13		10,413	0–3
4	February 2, 2008	@ Edmonton Rush	Rexall Place	W 11–10		7,072	1–3
5	February 7, 2008	@ Colorado Mammoth	Pepsi Center	L 12–15		15,910	1–4
6	February 10, 2008	@ Minnesota Swarm	Xcel Energy Center	L 13–14	OT	11,244	1–5
7	February 17, 2008	Edmonton Rush	Rose Garden	W 14–8		6,793	2–5
8	February 22, 2008	Calgary Roughnecks	Rose Garden	W 13–9		7,349	3–5
9	March 1, 2008	Edmonton Rush	Rose Garden	L 7–9		7,744	3–6
10	March 8, 2008	@ Calgary Roughnecks	Pengrowth Saddledome	L 12–15		18,737	3–7
11	March 20, 2008	Colorado Mammoth	Rose Garden	W 16–15		6,182	4–7
12	April 5, 2008	San Jose Stealth	Rose Garden	L 9–12		10,359	4–8
13	April 6, 2008	@ San Jose Stealth	HP Pavilion at San Jose	W 12–10		3,418	5–8
14	April 11, 2008	Philadelphia Wings	Rose Garden	L 10–13		9,195	5–9
15	April 18, 2008	@ San Jose Stealth	HP Pavilion at San Jose	W 12–11	OT	3,341	6–9
16	April 26, 2008	@ Buffalo Bandits	HSBC Arena	L 10–14		18,325	6–10

== Playoffs ==
=== Game log ===
Game	Date	Opponent	Location	Score	OT	Attendance	Record
Division Semifinal	May 4, 2008	@ San Jose Stealth	HP Pavilion at San Jose	W 18–16		2,697	1–0
Division Final	May 10, 2008	@ Calgary Roughnecks	Pengrowth Saddledome	W 16–12		9,327	2–0
Championship Game	May 17, 2008	@ Buffalo Bandits	HSBC Arena	L 13–14		18,690	2–1

== Player stats ==
=== Runners (Top 10) ===
Note: GP = Games played; G = Goals; A = Assists; Pts = Points; LB = Loose balls; PIM = Penalty minutes

Player	GP	G	A	Pts	LB	PIM
Dan Dawson	16	38	43	81	96	11
Ryan Powell	16	21	43	64	75	2
Derek Malawsky	16	25	35	60	71	15
Brodie Merrill	16	17	21	38	211	53
Peter Morgan	14	17	18	35	79	8
Spencer Martin	12	5	29	34	28	6
Pete Jacobs	11	11	12	23	40	0
Cory Conway	11	11	10	21	28	0
Scott Stewart	15	7	14	21	89	6
Totals		267	446	297	1128	42

=== Goaltenders ===
Note: GP = Games played; MIN = Minutes; W = Wins; L = Losses; GA = Goals against; Sv% = Save percentage; GAA = Goals against average

Player	GP	MIN	W	L	GA	Sv%	GAA
Matt King	11	464:56	4	5	93	.720	12.00
Matt Disher	4	243:50	2	2	44	.787	10.83
Dallas Eliuk	16	255:36	0	3	53	.745	12.44
Joel Weber	1	3:25	0	0	1	.000	17.56
Totals			6	10	194	.742	12.13

== Awards ==
Player	Award
Tyler Codron	All-Rookie Team
Peter Jacobs	Rookie of the Month, April
Brodie Merrill	All-Stars
Ryan Powell	All-Stars

== Transactions ==
=== Trades ===
March 25, 2008	To Edmonton Rush Matt King; Ian Crashley first round pick, 2008 entry draft	To Portland LumberJax Matt Disher fourth round pick, 2009 entry draft

== Roster ==
No.		Position	Player
49	(Canada)	Def	Alexander, Bruce
20	(Canada)	Trans	Bysouth, Adam
7	(United States)	Trans	Codron, Tyler
91	(Canada)	Fwd	Conway, Cory
	(Canada)	Def	Crashley, Ian
6	(Canada)	Fwd	Dawson, Dan
39	(Canada)	Goalie	Disher, Matt
35	(Canada)	Goalie	Eliuk, Dallas
2	(Canada)	Def	Guze, Ray
	(United States)	Fwd	Heavenor, Tyler
11	(United States)	Fwd	Holman, Matt
1	(Haudenosaunee)	Fwd	Jacobs (akw), Pete
12	(Canada)	Def	Jones, Pat
55	(Canada)	Def	Kilby, Mike

No.		Position	Player
	(Canada)	Goalie	King, Matt
	(Canada)	Fwd	Lowe, Derek
28	(Canada)	Def	MacDonald, Brad
18	(Canada)	Fwd	Malawsky, Derek
15	(Canada)	Fwd	Martin, Spencer
	(Canada)	Def	Mazuran, Scott
17	(United States)	Trans	Merrill, Brodie
13	(Canada)	Def	Morgan, David
44	(Canada)	Fwd	Morgan, Peter
33	(United States)	Def	Morgan, Richard
	(United States)	Def	Munk, Jonathan
22	(United States)	Fwd	Powell, Ryan
10	(Canada)	Trans	Stapleford, Scott
8	(Canada)	Fwd	Stewart, Scott
41	(Canada)	Goalie	Weber, Joel

== See also ==
- 2008 NLL season
