= New York Titans =

New York Titans may refer to:

- Titans of New York (1960–1962), the former name of the National Football League's New York Jets
- New York Titans (lacrosse), a National Lacrosse League team now known as the Orlando Titans
