= 2008 Rochester Knighthawks season =

NLL team season

2008 Rochester Knighthawks
- League: NLL
- Division: 5th East
- 2008 record: 8-8
- Home record: 4-4
- Road record: 4-4
- Goals for: 197
- Goals against: 171
- General Manager: Jody Gage
- Coach: Ed Comeau
- Captain: Regy Thorpe
- Alternate captains: Shawn Williams; John Grant, Jr.
- Arena: Blue Cross Arena
- Average attendance: 10,691

Team leaders
- Goals: John Grant, Jr. (47)
- Assists: Shawn Williams (55)
- Points: John Grant, Jr. (92)
- Penalties in minutes: Shawn Evans (63)
- Loose Balls: Steve Toll (166)
- Wins: Pat O'Toole (8)
- Goals against average: Pat O'Toole (10.52)

The Rochester Knighthawks were a lacrosse team based in Rochester, New York, that played in the National Lacrosse League (NLL). The 2008 season was the 14th in franchise history.

After finishing the 2007 season with a 14-game winning stream winning the Champion's Cup, the Knighthawks hoped to continue their success into 2008. They continued their winning streak by beating the Buffalo Bandits in the season opener, but then lost the next three. The Knighthawks finished with an 8-8 record, good for 5th place in the Eastern division, and missed the playoffs for the first time in franchise history.

== Regular season ==
=== Conference standings ===
East Division
P	Team	GP	W	L	PCT	GB	Home	Road	GF	GA	Diff	GF/GP	GA/GP
1	Buffalo Bandits – xyz	16	10	6	.625	0.0	7–2	3–4	203	174	+29	12.69	10.88
2	Minnesota Swarm – x	16	10	6	.625	0.0	6–2	4–4	199	196	+3	12.44	12.25
3	New York Titans – x	16	10	6	.625	0.0	5–1	5–5	197	186	+11	12.31	11.62
4	Philadelphia Wings – x	16	10	6	.625	0.0	7–1	3–5	225	220	+5	14.06	13.75
5	Rochester Knighthawks	16	8	8	.500	2.0	4–4	4–4	197	171	+26	12.31	10.69
6	Toronto Rock	16	7	9	.438	3.0	4–5	3–4	172	174	−2	10.75	10.88
7	Chicago Shamrox	16	6	10	.375	4.0	3–5	3–5	176	212	−36	11.00	13.25

West Division
P	Team	GP	W	L	PCT	GB	Home	Road	GF	GA	Diff	GF/GP	GA/GP
1	San Jose Stealth – xy	16	9	7	.562	0.0	4–4	5–3	185	172	+13	11.56	10.75
2	Colorado Mammoth – x	16	9	7	.562	0.0	6–2	3–5	184	167	+17	11.50	10.44
3	Calgary Roughnecks – x	16	7	9	.438	2.0	5–3	2–6	183	178	+5	11.44	11.12
4	Portland LumberJax – x	16	6	10	.375	3.0	3–5	3–5	179	194	−15	11.19	12.12
5	Edmonton Rush	16	4	12	.250	5.0	3–5	1–7	141	197	−56	8.81	12.31

x: Clinched playoff berth; c: Clinched playoff berth by crossing over to another division; y: Clinched division; z: Clinched best regular season record; GP: Games Played
W: Wins; L: Losses; GB: Games back; PCT: Win percentage; Home: Record at Home; Road: Record on the Road; GF: Goals scored; GA: Goals allowed
Differential: Difference between goals scored and allowed; GF/GP: Average number of goals scored per game; GA/GP: Average number of goals allowed per game

=== Game log ===
Game	Date	Opponent	Location	Score	OT	Attendance	Record
1	January 11, 2008	@ Buffalo Bandits	HSBC Arena	W 12–9		18,670	1–0
2	January 12, 2008	Buffalo Bandits	Blue Cross Arena	L 9–14		10,939	1–1
3	January 18, 2008	@ Philadelphia Wings	Wachovia Center	L 14–15		9,248	1–2
4	January 26, 2008	Minnesota Swarm	Blue Cross Arena	L 17–18	OT	9,686	1–3
5	February 9, 2008	Toronto Rock	Blue Cross Arena	W 11–4		9,925	2–3
6	February 16, 2008	Calgary Roughnecks	Blue Cross Arena	W 15–12		8,871	3–3
7	February 23, 2008	New York Titans	Blue Cross Arena	L 11–14		10,118	3–4
8	March 1, 2008	@ Chicago Shamrox	Sears Centre	W 18–8		5,335	4–4
9	March 15, 2008	@ Edmonton Rush	Rexall Place	L 9–10	OT	6,711	4–5
10	March 22, 2008	Chicago Shamrox	Blue Cross Arena	L 11–12		10,221	4–6
11	March 29, 2008	Philadelphia Wings	Blue Cross Arena	W 20–12		8,940	5–6
12	April 3, 2008	@ Colorado Mammoth	Pepsi Center	L 8–11		16,860	5–7
13	April 5, 2008	@ Toronto Rock	Air Canada Centre	W 9–6		15,422	6–7
14	April 12, 2008	Buffalo Bandits	Blue Cross Arena	W 11–6		10,517	7–7
15	April 19, 2008	@ Minnesota Swarm	Xcel Energy Center	W 11–8		11,568	8–7
16	April 26, 2008	@ New York Titans	Madison Square Garden	L 11–12		8,026	8–8

== Player stats ==
=== Runners (Top 10) ===
Note: GP = Games played; G = Goals; A = Assists; Pts = Points; LB = Loose balls; PIM = Penalty minutes

Player	GP	G	A	Pts	LB	PIM
John Grant, Jr.	16	47	45	92	116	16
Shawn Williams	16	25	55	80	64	2
Scott Evans	16	44	34	78	88	28
Shawn Evans	15	25	38	63	61	63
Ken Millin	15	8	25	33	49	8
Steve Toll	16	7	25	32	166	8
Stephen Hoar	16	5	17	22	76	36
Sandy Chapman	16	1	15	16	77	12
Matt Lyons	12	9	6	15	26	9
Totals		317	514	375	1167	44

=== Goaltenders ===
Note: GP = Games played; MIN = Minutes; W = Wins; L = Losses; GA = Goals against; Sv% = Save percentage; GAA = Goals against average

Player	GP	MIN	W	L	GA	Sv%	GAA
Pat O'Toole	16	889:25	8	6	156	.776	10.52
Phil Wetherup	15	71:39	0	2	13	.759	10.89
Grant Crawley	1	4:30	0	0	0	1.000	.00
Totals			8	8	171	.773	10.69

== Awards ==
Player	Award
John Grant, Jr.	All-Stars
Scott Evans	All-Stars
Steve Toll	All-Stars
Shawn Williams	All-Stars

== Roster ==
No.		Position	Player
43	(United States)	Def	Abrams, Marshall
26	(Canada)	Def	Brown, David
		?	Bucktooth, Drew
5	(Canada)	Def	Chapman, Sandy
42	(United States)	Def	Cougevan, Pat
52	(Canada)	Goalie	Crawley, Grant
25	(United States)	Def	Ditzell, Scott
	(United States)	Def	Dutton, Pat
19	(Canada)	Fwd	Evans (sc), Scott
15	(Canada)	Fwd	Evans (sh), Shawn
	(Canada)	Def	Forget, Luke
24	(Canada)	Fwd	Grant, John
20	(Canada)	Def	Greer, Bill
23	(Canada)	Trans	Hoar, Stephen

No.		Position	Player
21	(Canada)	Fwd	Lyons, Matt
14	(United States)	Fwd	McLeod, Mat
32	(Canada)	Fwd	Millin, Ken
39	(Canada)	Goalie	O'Toole, Pat
16	(Canada)	Fwd	Potter, Andrew
18	(United States)	Def	Reid, Jack
2	(United States)	Trans	Schiller, Chris
	(United States)	Fwd	Spillett, Brandon
11	(United States)	Def	Thorpe, Regy
17	(Canada)	Trans	Toll, Steve
22		?	Vitarelli, Cory
90	(Canada)	Goalie	Wetherup, Phil
		?	Wilkins, Shawn
51	(Canada)	Fwd	Williams, Shawn

== See also ==
- 2008 NLL season
