= Shawn Cable =

Canadian lacrosse player

Personal information
- Nationality: Canadian
- Born: February 2, 1980 (age 46) Prince George, British Columbia, Canada
- Height: 6 ft 0 in (183 cm)
- Weight: 195 lb (88 kg; 13 st 13 lb)

Sport
- Position: forward/transition
- Shoots: Left
- NLL draft: 34th overall, 2001; Calgary Roughnecks
- NLL teams: Calgary Roughnecks; Colorado Mammoth; Anaheim Storm; Portland LumberJax
- Pro career: 2002–2008

Shawn Cable (born February 2, 1980, in Prince George, British Columbia) is a former professional indoor lacrosse player who played for the Calgary Roughnecks, Colorado Mammoth, Anaheim Storm and Portland LumberJax in the National Lacrosse League. He is currently a video analyst for the Roughnecks.

Cable was the first graduate of the Prince George Minor Lacrosse Association to go on to play in the NLL. He won the Ed Bayley Memorial Trophy in 2002 as the Western Lacrosse Association Outstanding Rookie as a member of the North Shore Thunder.
