= Jeff Ratcliffe =

Canadian lacrosse player

Personal information
- Nickname: The Rat
- Nationality: Canadian
- Born: March 15, 1976 (age 50) Coquitlam, British Columbia, Canada
- Height: 6 ft 1 in (185 cm)
- Weight: 205 lb (93 kg; 14 st 9 lb)

Sport
- Position: Offense
- Shoots: Right
- NLL draft: 4th overall, 2000; Philadelphia Wings
- NLL teams: New York Titans; Philadelphia Wings
- Former WLA team: Burnaby Lakers
- Pro career: 2001–2008

Jeff Ratcliffe (born March 15, 1976, in Coquitlam, British Columbia) is a former lacrosse player for the New York Titans and the Philadelphia Wings in the National Lacrosse League. Ratcliffe attended the University of Maryland, Baltimore County.

Ratcliffe was a first round draft pick in the 2001 NLL Entry Draft by the Philadelphia Wings, and played for seven seasons with the Wings, being named to the All-Star team in 2004. After the 2007 season, Ratcliffe was released by the Wings, and signed by the New York Titans for the 2008 NLL season. Ratcliffe played one season in New York before retiring to spend more time with his family.

== Statistics ==
=== NLL ===
		Regular Season						Playoffs
Season	Team	GP	G	A	Pts	LB	PIM	GP	G	A	Pts	LB	PIM
2001	Philadelphia	14	21	25	46	68	10	2	4	2	6	13	8
2002	Philadelphia	16	47	20	67	81	25	1	3	1	4	2	0
2003	Philadelphia	16	35	32	67	66	22	--	--	--	--	--	--
2004	Philadelphia	16	41	24	65	76	19	--	--	--	--	--	--
2005	Philadelphia	16	39	31	70	57	18	--	--	--	--	--	--
2007	Philadelphia	14	16	5	21	66	26	--	--	--	--	--	--
2008	New York	16	12	13	25	51	12	2	4	0	4	8	0
NLL totals		108	211	150	351	465	132	5	11	3	14	23	8
