= 2008 NLL season =

- League: National Lacrosse League
- Sport: Indoor lacrosse
- Duration: December 29, 2007 – May 17, 2008
- Games: 16
- Teams: 12

Regular season
- Season MVP: Athan Iannucci (Philadelphia)
- Top scorer: Athan Iannucci (Philadelphia)

Playoffs
- Eastern champions: Buffalo Bandits
- Eastern runners-up: Minnesota Swarm
- Western champions: San Jose Stealth
- Western runners-up: Colorado Mammoth

Champion's Cup
- Champions: Buffalo Bandits (4th title)
- Runners-up: Portland LumberJax
- Finals MVP: Mark Steenhuis (Buffalo)

NLL seasons
- ← 2007 season 2009 season →

The 2008 National Lacrosse League season, the 22nd in the history of the NLL, began on December 29, 2007, and concluded with the Buffalo Bandits winning the championship game over the Portland LumberJax on May 17, 2008.

In an odd coincidence, all four eastern division teams that made the playoffs finished with identical 10–6 records. Due to tiebreakers, the Buffalo Bandits clinched first place overall, followed by the Minnesota Swarm, New York Titans in their playoff debut, and the Philadelphia Wings in their return to the playoffs after a five-year absence.

There was also a tie atop the west division standings, as the San Jose Stealth and Colorado Mammoth both finished with 9–7 records. The Stealth won that tiebreaker and clinched their first western division title. The Calgary Roughnecks and Portland LumberJax finished out the playoff teams in the west despite having losing records.

History was made in 2008 as neither the Rochester Knighthawks nor the Toronto Rock made the playoffs, for the first time in the history of either team (though the Toronto franchise, then the Ontario Raiders, missed the playoffs in their inaugural season in 1998). The Knighthawks broke a 13-year streak of making the playoffs, the Rock streak was stopped at 9 years.

Philadelphia Wings second-year stars Athan Iannucci and Geoff Snider set a number of new league records in 2008. Iannucci eclipsed Gary Gait's record of 61 goals by scoring 71, and Snider set or tied marks in loose balls (244), face offs won (318, tied with Peter Jacobs in 2005), and penalty minutes (103).

The 2008 season almost never happened. On October 16, 2007, the league released a statement officially cancelling the season, after no agreement could be reached on a new collective bargaining agreement. However, negotiations continued, and on October 25, the league announced that a new CBA has been agreed on, and that the season would proceed. The new revised schedule was released on November 2, 2007, but only included 12 of the expected 14 teams. The expansion Boston Blazers and 2007 Western division champion Arizona Sting had decided for "a number of business reasons" to opt out of the 2008 season and return in 2009. Due to the short time frame between the agreement on a new CBA and the start of the season, the New York Titans were unable to secure 8 home dates for the revised schedule, and thus both the Toronto Rock and Buffalo Bandits hosted a Titans home game in their own arena.

== Team movement ==
An expansion franchise for Boston, Massachusetts was announced on May 9, 2007. It was expected that the team would play at the TD Banknorth Garden, which is also home to the NBA's Boston Celtics and the NHL's Boston Bruins. On October 3, 2007, the Boston franchise was officially named the Boston Blazers.

When the revised schedule was released on November 2, 2007, it was announced that both the Arizona Sting and Boston Blazers were suspending operations for the 2008 season, returning in 2009.

=== Work stoppage ===
In the off-season between the 2007 and 2008 seasons the Collective Bargaining Agreement between the National Lacrosse League and the Professional Lacrosse Players' Association expired. The owners announced that if there no deal was in place before midnight, October 15, 2007 the 2008 season would be cancelled. On the morning of October 16, the league announced that no agreement had been reached, and that the season was cancelled. The next day, commissioner Jim Jennings even said that the league would not change its mind about the cancellation, saying:

There's no hope due to the fact that we've released our dates. It's very difficult to get dates in places like (New York's) Madison Square Garden and (Toronto's) ACC Centre and places like that. To try to restart this thing up on a moment's notice is an impossibility.

However, the negotiations continued, and on October 25, the league announced that a new seven-year agreement had been reached, and that the season would be played.

Before the initial cancellation of the season, the Versus network announced that it would not carry a game of the week, as they had in 2007, even if an agreement was reached before the deadline.

=== Teams ===
2008 National Lacrosse League
Division	Team	City	Arena	Capacity
East	Buffalo Bandits	Buffalo, New York	HSBC Arena	18,690
East	Chicago Shamrox	Hoffman Estates, Illinois	Sears Centre Arena	9,500
East	Minnesota Swarm	Saint Paul, Minnesota	XCEL Energy Center	18,064
East	New York Titans	New York, New York	Madison Square Garden	18,200
East	Philadelphia Wings	Philadelphia, Pennsylvania	Wachovia Center	19,523
East	Rochester Knighthawks	Rochester, New York	Blue Cross Arena	10,662
East	Toronto Rock	Toronto, Ontario	Air Canada Centre	18,800
West	Calgary Roughnecks	Calgary, Alberta	Pengrowth Saddledome	19,289
West	Colorado Mammoth	Denver, Colorado	Pepsi Center	18,007
West	Edmonton Rush	Edmonton, Alberta	Rexall Place	16,839
West	Portland Lumberjax	Portland, Oregon	Rose Garden	18,280
West	San Jose Stealth	San Jose, California	HP Pavilion	17,496

=== Map of teams ===
East Division West Division

== Final standings ==
East Division
P	Team	GP	W	L	PCT	GB	Home	Road	GF	GA	Diff	GF/GP	GA/GP
1	Buffalo Bandits – xyz	16	10	6	.625	0.0	7–2	3–4	203	174	+29	12.69	10.88
2	Minnesota Swarm – x	16	10	6	.625	0.0	6–2	4–4	199	196	+3	12.44	12.25
3	New York Titans – x	16	10	6	.625	0.0	5–1	5–5	197	186	+11	12.31	11.62
4	Philadelphia Wings – x	16	10	6	.625	0.0	7–1	3–5	225	220	+5	14.06	13.75
5	Rochester Knighthawks	16	8	8	.500	2.0	4–4	4–4	197	171	+26	12.31	10.69
6	Toronto Rock	16	7	9	.438	3.0	4–5	3–4	172	174	−2	10.75	10.88
7	Chicago Shamrox	16	6	10	.375	4.0	3–5	3–5	176	212	−36	11.00	13.25

West Division
P	Team	GP	W	L	PCT	GB	Home	Road	GF	GA	Diff	GF/GP	GA/GP
1	San Jose Stealth – xy	16	9	7	.562	0.0	4–4	5–3	185	172	+13	11.56	10.75
2	Colorado Mammoth – x	16	9	7	.562	0.0	6–2	3–5	184	167	+17	11.50	10.44
3	Calgary Roughnecks – x	16	7	9	.438	2.0	5–3	2–6	183	178	+5	11.44	11.12
4	Portland LumberJax – x	16	6	10	.375	3.0	3–5	3–5	179	194	−15	11.19	12.12
5	Edmonton Rush	16	4	12	.250	5.0	3–5	1–7	141	197	−56	8.81	12.31

x: Clinched playoff berth; c: Clinched playoff berth by crossing over to another division; y: Clinched division; z: Clinched best regular season record; GP: Games Played
W: Wins; L: Losses; GB: Games back; PCT: Win percentage; Home: Record at Home; Road: Record on the Road; GF: Goals scored; GA: Goals allowed
Differential: Difference between goals scored and allowed; GF/GP: Average number of goals scored per game; GA/GP: Average number of goals allowed per game

=== Playoffs ===
Divisional Semifinal
E1	Buffalo	14
E4	Philadelphia	12
Eastern Division
E2	Minnesota	8
E3	New York	11
W1	San Jose	16
W4	Portland	18
Western Division
W2	Colorado	13
W3	Calgary	15

Divisional Final
E1	Buffalo	19
E3	New York	12
W3	Calgary	12
W4	Portland	16

Champion's Cup Final
E1	Buffalo	14
W4	Portland	13

== Milestones and events ==
=== Pre-season ===
- August 22, 2007: Colorado Mammoth head coach Gary Gait announced that he was stepping down to become the head coach of the women's lacrosse team at his alma mater, Syracuse University. Former Arizona Sting assistant coach Bob McMahon was announced as Gait's replacement.
- July 24, 2007: Less than three months after the end of the 2007 NLL season, the league announced one of the biggest blockbuster trades in NLL history. The trade involved three teams and six players, including a former Rookie of the Year and a former MVP and Goaltender of the Year. The trade saw the Calgary Roughnecks sending defenseman Taylor Wray to the Philadelphia Wings, and their first-round pick in the 2007 entry draft and their second-round pick in the 2008 entry draft to the Buffalo Bandits. The Wings sent Sean Greenhalgh to Buffalo and Ian Llord to Calgary, and the Bandits sent goaltender Steve Dietrich and Kyle Couling to Calgary and Jason Crosbie to Philadelphia. During the entry draft in September, Llord was traded again, this time from Calgary to Buffalo for two draft picks.
- October 16, 2007: The league announced that the 2008 season had been cancelled due to the failure of the owners and players to reach a CBA.
- October 25, 2007: The league announced that a new agreement had been reached, and that the 2008 would indeed be played.
- November 2, 2007: The revised schedule was released, and the league announced that the Arizona Sting and Boston Blazers would not play in 2008.
- November 5, 2007: A dispersal draft was held for the remaining teams to choose players from the Arizona and Boston franchises.

=== Regular season ===
- January 9: The league announced the inductees into the National Lacrosse League Hall of Fame for 2008: Sal LoCascio, Johnny Mouradian, Tony Resch, and Neil Stevens.
- January 12: The Rochester Knighthawks' 16-game winning streak came to an end as the Buffalo Bandits defeated the Knighthawks 14–9 in Rochester. The Knighthawks had extended the streak with a victory over Buffalo in the opening game the previous night.
- January 17: The NLL announced that New York Titans star Casey Powell would once again host "Inside the NLL with Casey Powell", a weekly one-hour show on Sirius Satellite Radio.
- January 20: John Tavares of the Buffalo Bandits scored his 597th career goal in a win over the New York Titans, passing Gary Gait and becoming the NLL's all-time leader in goals scored.
- January 30: The Edmonton Rush traded Chris Seller to the Calgary Roughnecks for a third-round draft pick in the 2008 entry draft.
- February 5: Forward Andrew Lazore is traded from the Chicago Shamrox to the Buffalo Bandits for two second-round draft picks in the 2008 entry draft.
- February 8: The Minnesota Swarm established a league record by running up a 12–0 lead before the New York Titans broke their scoreless streak in the third quarter.
- February 20: After starting the season with an 0–5 record, the Rush fired the franchise's original head coach and general manager, Paul Day. On February 21, the Rush announced that Day's replacement would be former NLL Coach and GM of the Year Bob Hamley.
- March 5: Three separate trades involving four teams and six players were made:
  - Edmonton traded a 2008 conditional third-round draft pick and a 2009 conditional third-round draft pick to Chicago for Lindsay Plunkett
  - Chicago sent goalie Brandon Miller and a 2008 second-round draft pick to Philadelphia for Matt Roik, Brad Self, a 2009 first-round draft pick, and a 2010 second-round draft pick
  - In a three-way deal, Edmonton sent A.J. Shannon to Philadelphia, the Wings send Dan Marohl and Keith Cromwell to Minnesota, and Minnesota sent Mike Hominuck to the Rush.
- March 22: Colorado's Brian Langtry scored 9 goals and assisted on 4 others in a losing cause, as the Mammoth lost to the Portland LumberJax. Langtry's 9 goals is the most scored by a player in one game this season.
- March 25: Multiple players were dealt on the season's trade deadline:
  - In an exchange of All-Stars, the Toronto Rock traded set-up man Josh Sanderson to the Calgary Roughnecks for finisher Lewis Ratcliff. The teams also exchanged draft picks.
  - The Edmonton Rush were the most active at the deadline, exchanging goalkeepers with the Portland LumberJax with Matt Disher and a fourth-round draft pick going to the LumberJax in exchange for Matt King, Ian Crashley, and a first-round pick in the 2009 draft. The Rush traded Chris Gill and a second-round pick to the Colorado Mammoth for a first-round draft pick in the 2008 draft, and also traded Mike Accursi to the Buffalo Bandits for Dan Teat, a second-round draft pick in the 2008 draft, a first-round draft pick in the 2009 draft.
- April 12: Athan Iannucci scored three goals and broke Gary Gait's record of 61 goals in a season. Iannucci entered the game with 60 goals, averaging 4.6 goals per game, but didn't score the record-tying goal until six minutes into the third quarter. He then scored the record-setting goal less than three minutes later and then completed his hat-trick in the fourth quarter.
- April 27: After announcing his retirement earlier in the year, Jim Veltman, the league's all-time loose balls leader, played the final game of his 16-year career.

=== Glenn Clark suspension ===
On January 11, the Minnesota Swarm defeated the Toronto Rock 17–16 in overtime, in a game which saw three Swarm players and one Rock player given game misconducts. After the game, Rock head coach Glenn Clark was involved in an altercation with Minnesota forward Sean Pollock outside the Rock dressing room. Clark was later charged with assault by Toronto Police and suspended indefinitely by the NLL. The Rock announced that assistant coach Terry Bullen would serve as the interim head coach and Bullen led the Rock to a 2–2 record.

On February 6, the charges against Clark were dropped by Toronto Police, and the NLL lifted the suspension on February 13.

== All-Star game ==
The 2008 All-Star Game was held at Rexall Place in Edmonton on March 16, 2008. The East division All-Stars defeated the West division 17–16 in overtime, as Shawn Williams scored the winner 31 seconds into OT. Philadelphia Wings' transition player Geoff Snider was named MVP.

=== All-Star teams ===
Eastern Division starters	Western Division starters
Athan Iannucci, Philadelphia	Jeff Zywicki, San Jose
John Tavares, Buffalo	Dan Carey, Colorado
John Grant, Jr., Rochester	Gavin Prout, Colorado
Mark Steenhuis, Buffalo	Brodie Merrill, Portland
Ryan Cousins, Minnesota	Eric Martin, San Jose
Nick Patterson, Minnesota (goalie)	Gee Nash, Colorado (goalie)
Eastern Division reserves	Western Division reserves
Scott Evans, Rochester	Mike Accursi, Edmonton
Casey Powell, New York *	Dan Dawson, Arizona
Andy Secore, Minnesota *	Colin Doyle, San Jose
Geoff Snider, Philadelphia	Ryan Powell, Portland *
Steve Toll, Rochester	Lewis Ratcliff, Calgary
Jim Veltman, Toronto	Jeff Shattler, Calgary
Peter Lough, Toronto	Josh Sims, Colorado *
Jarett Park, New York	Jimmy Quinlan, Edmonton
Scott Self, Chicago	Andrew McBride, Calgary
Chris White, Buffalo	Chris McElroy, Edmonton
Taylor Wray, Philadelphia	Bruce Murray, Colorado
Bob Watson, Toronto (goalie)	Anthony Cosmo, San Jose (goalie)
Ryan Ward, Minnesota (replacing C. Powell)	Dan Stroup, Edmonton (replacing R. Powell)
Shawn Williams, Rochester (replacing Secore)	Nick Carlson, Colorado (replacing Sims)

* Unable to play due to injury

== Awards ==
=== Annual ===
Award	Winner	Team
Reebok Most Valuable Player	Athan Iannucci	Philadelphia
US Navy Goaltender of the Year	Bob Watson	Toronto
Edge Defensive Player of the Year	Ryan Cousins	Minnesota
Transition Player of the Year	Mark Steenhuis	Buffalo
Rookie of the Year	Craig Point	Minnesota
Sportsmanship Award	Dan Carey	Colorado
GM of the Year	Marty O'Neill	Minnesota
Les Bartley Award	Adam Mueller	New York
Executive of the Year Award	Tom Garrity	Minnesota
Tom Borrelli Award	Paul Tutka	

=== All-Pro teams ===
First Team

- Athan Iannucci, Philadelphia
- Casey Powell, New York
- John Tavares, Buffalo
- Mark Steenhuis, Buffalo
- Ryan Cousins, Minnesota
- Bob Watson, Toronto

Second Team

- Colin Doyle, San Jose
- Gavin Prout, Colorado
- Jeff Zywicki, San Jose
- Geoff Snider, Philadelphia
- Scott Self, Chicago
- Matt Vinc, New York

=== All-Rookie team ===
- Craig Point, Minnesota
- Tyler Codron, Portland
- Jordan Hall, New York
- Bobby McBride, Chicago
- Jamie Rooney, Philadelphia
- Merrick Thomson, Philadelphia

=== Weekly awards ===
The NLL gives out awards weekly for the best overall player, best offensive player, best transition player, best defensive player, and best rookie.

Month	Week	Overall	Offensive	Defensive	Transition	Rookie
December	1	Jason Wulder	Jason Wulder	Gord Nash	Josh Sims	Dane Dobbie
January	2	Blaine Manning	Blaine Manning	Rob Marshall	Bobby McBride	Bobby McBride
January	3	Jeff Zywicki	Jeff Zywicki	Nick Patterson	Johnny Christmas	Craig Point
January	4	John Tavares	John Tavares	Bob Watson	Pat McCready	Merrick Thomson
January	5	Sean Pollock	Sean Pollock	Ryan Avery	Geoff Snider	Jordan Hall
February	6	Jeff Zywicki	Jeff Zywicki	Aaron Bold	Jimmy Quinlan	Craig Point
February	7	Pat O'Toole	Shawn Evans	Pat O'Toole	Jarett Park	Craig Point
February	8	John Grant, Jr.	John Grant, Jr.	Bob Watson	Brodie Merrill	Jordan Hall
February	9	Casey Powell	Casey Powell	Daniel Sams	Rob Van Beek	Daniel Sams
February	10	Shawn Evans	Shawn Evans	Curtis Palidwor	Mark Steenhuis	Steve Hutchins
March	11	Ken Montour	Luke Wiles	Ken Montour	Mark Steenhuis	Frank Resetarits
March	12	Gavin Prout	Mike Hominuck	Matt Vinc	John Orson	Craig Point
March	13	Bob Watson	Brian Langtry	Bob Watson	Mitch Belisle	Sean Morris
March	14	Cody Jacobs	Cody Jacobs	Rory Glaves	Chris McKay	Matt MacLeod
April	15	Jeff Zywicki	Ryan Ward	Scott Self	Mark Steenhuis	Bobby McBride
April	16	Athan Iannucci	Athan Iannucci	Pat O'Toole	Nolan Heavenor	Tom Johnson
April	17	Pat Maddalena	Pat Maddalena	Matt Vinc	Mark Steenhuis	Jordan Hall
April	18	Jim Veltman	John Tavares	Greg Peyser	Brad Self	Peter Jacobs

=== Monthly awards ===
Awards are also given out monthly for the best overall player and best rookie.

Month	Overall	Rookie
January	Athan Iannucci	Merrick Thomson
February	Athan Iannucci	Craig Point
March	Curtis Palidwor	Jordan Hall
April	Athan Iannucci	Peter Jacobs

== Statistics leaders ==
Bold numbers indicate new single-season records. Italics indicate tied single-season records.

Stat	Player	Team	Number
Goals	Athan Iannucci	Philadelphia	**71**
Assists	Gavin Prout	Colorado	67
Points	Athan Iannucci	Philadelphia	100
Penalty Minutes	Geoff Snider	Philadelphia	**103**
Shots on Goal	Athan Iannucci	Philadelphia	253
Loose Balls	Geoff Snider	Philadelphia	**244**
Save Pct	Ken Montour	Buffalo	.808
GAA	Chris Levis	Colorado	10.04

== Attendance ==
=== Regular season ===
Home team	Home games	Average attendance	Total Attendance
Colorado Mammoth	8	17,464	139,719
Buffalo Bandits	9	15,013	135,120
Toronto Rock	9	14,572	131,149
Calgary Roughnecks	8	11,605	97,690
Philadelphia Wings	8	11,605	92,846
Minnesota Swarm	8	11,405	91,247
Rochester Knighthawks	8	9,902	79,217
Edmonton Rush	8	8,820	70,564
Portland LumberJax	8	8,104	64,837
New York Titans	6	6,509	39,055
Chicago Shamrox	8	4,964	39,712
San Jose Stealth	8	3,059	24,477
**League**	**96**	**10,475**	**1,005,633**

=== Playoffs ===
Home team	Home games	Average attendance	Total Attendance
Colorado Mammoth	1	15,554	15,554
Buffalo Bandits	3	13,015	39,046
Minnesota Swarm	1	11,088	11,088
Calgary Roughnecks	1	9,327	9,327
San Jose Stealth	1	2,697	2,697
**League**	**7**	**11,101**	**77,712**

== See also ==
- 2008 in sports
