= Timothy Kelly (sports executive) =

American Lacrosse Player, Sports and Entertainment Executive and Lawyer

Timothy Kelly, (born 1980) originally from Levittown, is currently serving in the role of General Counsel at Playhouse Square in Cleveland, Ohio, previously working as Senior Vice President of Legal and Assistant General Counsel for Hall of Fame Resort and Entertainment Company (Hall of Fame Village surrounding the Pro Football Hall of Fame) in Canton. Prior to this he worked as Business Affairs Executive at William Morris Endeavor in their sports division. Early in his career Kelly also served as the General Manager for the Long Island Lizards of Major League Lacrosse, the Chief Operating Officer of the New York Titans of the National Lacrosse League, and the New York Dragons of the Arena Football League. He is a 2002 graduate of Brown University in Providence, Rhode Island, and a 2005 graduate of Brooklyn Law School in Brooklyn, New York. Also the name of the Press Secretary of The Residence
