= Matt Carroll (lacrosse) =

Canadian lacrosse player (born 1986)

Personal information
- Born: February 16, 1986 (age 40) Ajax, Ontario, Canada
- Height: 6 ft 0 in (183 cm)
- Weight: 190 lb (86 kg; 13 st 8 lb)

Sport
- Position: Defense
- Shoots: Left
- NLL draft: 35th overall, 2006; Toronto Rock
- team Former teams: Toronto Rock
- Pro career: 2007–2010

Matt Carroll (born February 16, 1986) is a former professional lacrosse player for the Toronto Rock of the National Lacrosse League.
