= Jordan Cornfield =

Canadian lacrosse player

Personal information
- Born: October 28, 1982 (age 43) Edmonton, Alberta, Canada
- Height: 6 ft 0 in (183 cm)
- Weight: 212 lb (96 kg; 15 st 2 lb)

Sport
- Position: Forward
- Shoots: Left
- NLL draft: 58th overall, 2002; Vancouver Ravens
- NLL teams: Colorado Mammoth; Edmonton Rush
- Pro career: 2002–

Jordan Cornfield (born October 28, 1982, in Edmonton, Alberta) is a Canadian lacrosse player who has played with the Colorado Mammoth and the Edmonton Rush in the National Lacrosse League.

One of his brothers, Graedon, also signed to the Colorado Mammoth team in 2007. Jordan was playing with the Western Lacrosse Association in 2009.

== Statistics ==
=== NLL ===
		Regular Season						Playoffs
Season	Team	GP	G	A	Pts	LB	PIM	GP	G	A	Pts	LB	PIM
2006	Edmonton	6	2	1	3	15	2	--	--	--	--	--	--
2007	Colorado	9	9	3	12	21	6	0	0	0	0	0	0
2008	Colorado	7	7	11	18	27	2	1	1	1	2	2	0
NLL totals		22	18	15	33	63	10	1	1	1	2	2	0

=== WLA ===
		Regular Season
Season	Team	GP	G	A	Pts	LB	PIM
2009	Burnaby	5	2	5	0	1	0
WLA Totals		5	2	5	0	1	0
