= Mike MacLeod =

Canadian lacrosse player

Personal information
- Nationality: Canadian
- Born: Owen Sound

Sport
- NLL draft: 15th overall, 2006; Toronto Rock
- NLL teams: Edmonton Rush, Toronto Rock
- team Former teams: Toronto Rock

Mike MacLeod is a Canadian lacrosse player. He played professional lacrosse for the Toronto Rock of the NLL. MacLeod was selected by the Toronto Rock 15th overall in the 2006 National Lacrosse League Entry Draft.
