= Chris Levis =

Canadian lacrosse player

Personal information
- Nationality: Canadian
- Born: March 25, 1976 (age 49) Windsor, Ontario
- Height: 6 ft 1 in (185 cm)
- Weight: 221 lb (100 kg; 15 st 11 lb)

Sport
- Position: Goaltender
- Shoots: Left
- NLL draft: 63rd overall, 1997; Buffalo Bandits
- NLL team Former teams: Colorado Mammoth; Calgary Roughnecks; Edmonton Rush; Columbus Landsharks; Buffalo Bandits; New York Saints
- Pro career: 1998–

Chris Levis (born March 25, 1976, in Windsor, Ontario) is a Canadian goaltender for the Colorado Mammoth in the National Lacrosse League. Levis was the backup for the Mammoth in the 2006 season behind Gee Nash when they won the NLL Championship. He returned to the Mammoth in the 2010 season, where he ranked 12th in saves. He made 3 key overtime saves in his biggest win as a Mammoth, beating the Boston Bandits 9–8 in overtime to end a home losing streak at Pepsi Center dating back to April 2009, which ended March 25, 2011. He has previously played for Columbus, New York, Buffalo, Edmonton and Calgary.

== Statistics ==
=== NLL ===
		Regular Season						Playoffs
Season	Team	GP	Min	GA	Sv	GAA	Sv %	GP	Min	GA	Sv	GAA	Sv %
1998	Buffalo	3	31	10	15	19.35	60.00%	--	--	--	--	--	--
2000	New York	8	328	83	218	15.17	72.43%	--	--	--	--	--	--
2002	Columbus	6	135	26	89	11.54	77.39%	--	--	--	--	--	--
2002	Buffalo	10	58	16	28	16.49	63.64%	--	--	--	--	--	--
2006	Colorado	10	293	56	208	11.49	78.79%	1	24	5	18	12.33	78.26%
2007	Colorado	16	286	50	177	10.51	77.97%	1	35	6	25	10.28	80.65%
2008	Colorado	16	322	54	202	10.05	78.91%	1	0	0	0	0.00	0.00%
2009	Edmonton	16	596	111	386	11.17	77.67%	--	--	--	--	--	--
2010	Calgary	4	30	6	17	11.85	73.91%	--	--	--	--	--	--
2010	Colorado	11	557	106	345	11.41	76.50%	--	--	--	--	--	--
2011	Colorado	16	841	140	509	9.99	78.40%	1	60	8	33	8.00	80.50%
NLL totals		99	3,479	663	2,194	11.44	76.8%	4	180	35	76	11.70	68.5%
