= Peter Jacobs (lacrosse) =

American lacrosse player

Personal information
- Nationality: American
- Born: February 27, 1973 (age 53)
- Height: 6 ft 5 in (196 cm)
- Weight: 225 lb (102 kg; 16 st 1 lb)

Sport
- Position: Defense / Faceoff
- Shoots: right
- NLL draft: 6th overall, 1995; Philadelphia Wings
- NLL teams: Philadelphia Wings
- MLL teams: New Jersey Pride
- Pro career: 1996–

Peter Jacobs (born February 27, 1973) is a former professional lacrosse player. Jacobs graduated from Johns Hopkins University in Baltimore, MD in 1995. In his senior year, he was team captain of the Blue Jays was named first-team All-American in 1995 and lead his team to the Final Four.

== NLL career ==
Peter Jacobs began his National Lacrosse League career in 1996 with the Philadelphia Wings. He played with the Wings until his retirement before the 2009 season, making him one of the longest tenured professional athletes in Philadelphia sports.

=== Statistics ===
		Regular Season						Playoffs
Season	Team	GP	G	A	Pts	LB	PIM	GP	G	A	Pts	LB	PIM
1996	Philadelphia	8	8	10	18	23	2	2	0	2	2	12	0
1997	Philadelphia	9	0	5	5	26	0	1	0	0	0	0	0
1998	Philadelphia	11	3	10	13	33	10	3	2	4	6	16	2
2000	Philadelphia	12	4	11	15	69	8	1	0	1	1	3	0
2001	Philadelphia	12	3	4	7	80	4	2	0	1	1	16	0
2002	Philadelphia	12	1	6	7	110	4	1	0	0	0	6	0
2003	Philadelphia	12	1	1	2	81	4	--	--	--	--	--	--
2004	Philadelphia	12	5	8	13	122	2	--	--	--	--	--	--
2005	Philadelphia	16	1	9	10	180	8	--	--	--	--	--	--
2006	Philadelphia	16	3	8	11	147	2	--	--	--	--	--	--
2007	Philadelphia	14	1	3	4	79	0	--	--	--	--	--	--
2008	Philadelphia	12	0	2	2	46	2	--	--	--	--	--	--
NLL totals		164	65	119	184	1086	83	13	6	13	19	65	2

== MLL career ==
Peter Jacobs retired after playing with the New Jersey Pride for three seasons. During his tenure he won 524 of 1,016 face-off draws ranking him among the best in the sport.

=== Statistics ===
		Regular Season							Playoffs
Season	Team	GP	G	2ptG	A	Pts	LB	PIM	GP	G	2ptG	A	Pts	LB	PIM
2001	New Jersey	14	0	0	1	1	95	0.5	-	-	-	-	-	-	-
2002	New Jersey	14	3	1	1	5	97	1.5	1	0	0	0	0	10	0
2003	New Jersey	12	1	0	2	3	36	2	1	0	0	0	0	2	0
MLL Totals		40	4	1	4	9	228	4	2	0	0	0	0	12	0
