= A. J. Shannon =

Canadian retired lacrosse player (born 1980)

Personal information
- Born: June 8, 1980 (age 46) Whitby, Ontario, Canada
- Height: 6 ft 0 in (183 cm)
- Weight: 213 lb (97 kg; 15 st 3 lb)

Sport
- Position: Forward
- Shoots: Left
- NLL draft: 6th overall, 2003; Buffalo Bandits
- NLL teams: Philadelphia Wings; Edmonton Rush; Buffalo Bandits
- MLL teams: Boston Cannons
- Former NCAA team: University of Virginia
- Pro career: 2004–2010

A.J. Shannon (born June 8, 1980) is a Canadian retired lacrosse player, who played for the Philadelphia Wings, Edmonton Rush, and the Buffalo Bandits in the National Lacrosse League, and the Boston Cannons of the Major League Lacrosse.

== College career ==
While attending the University of Virginia, Shannon led the Cavaliers to win the 2003 NCAA Division I Men's Lacrosse Championship.

== Professional career ==
Shannon was drafted by the Buffalo Bandits in the first round (6th overall) in the 2003 NLL entry draft. Following the 2004 NLL season, he was named to the NLL All-Rookie team. He was acquired by the Edmonton Rush prior to the 2007 NLL season. In March of the 2008 NLL season, Shannon was traded to the Philadelphia Wings in a series a deals that involved four-teams and six players.

Shannon hit his stride in 2008, putting up his best point total since his rookie season. Shannon started with Edmonton, and finished in Philadelphia, scoring 40 points (22G, 18A), while collecting a career high 55 loose balls, helping Philadelphia to secure their first playoff berth since 2001.

Shannon's production would decline in 2009 with injuries, and eventually, finished his career in an injury-plagued 2010 season with Buffalo.

== Canadian Box career ==
Shannon is a two-time winner of the Minto Cup, Canada's Junior A Lacrosse National Championship, as a member of the Whitby Warriors in 1997 and 1999.

== Statistics ==
=== NLL ===
		Regular Season						Playoffs
Season	Team	GP	G	A	Pts	LB	PIM	GP	G	A	Pts	LB	PIM
2004	Buffalo	16	9	15	24	71	9	3	4	5	9	11	2
2005	Buffalo	16	25	15	40	78	8	1	3	2	5	10	0
2006	Buffalo	9	7	16	23	44	2	0	0	0	0	0	0
2007	Edmonton	5	5	6	11	13	4	--	--	--	--	--	--
2008	Edmonton	7	11	11	22	20	0	--	--	--	--	--	--
2008	Philadelphia	9	11	7	18	35	2	1	0	2	2	5	0
2009	Philadelphia	7	7	10	17	15	2	--	--	--	--	--	--
2010	Buffalo	3	1	2	3	7	2	--	--	--	--	--	--
NLL totals		72	76	82	158	283	29	5	7	9	16	26	2

=== University of Virginia ===
Season	GP	G	A	Pts	PPG
2000	15	16	8	24	--
2001	14	15	3	18	--
2002	15	25	10	35	2.33
2003	17	34	8	42	2.47
Totals	61	90	29	119	--
