= Chris Seller =

Canadian lacrosse player (born 1977)

Personal information
- Nationality: Canadian
- Born: February 4, 1977 (age 49) Richmond, British Columbia, Canada
- Height: 6 ft 2 in (188 cm)
- Weight: 195 lb (88 kg; 13 st 13 lb)

Sport
- Position: Transition
- Shoots: Left
- NLL teams: Buffalo Bandits; Anaheim Storm; Arizona Sting; Calgary Roughnecks; Edmonton Rush
- Pro career: 2000–2009

Chris Seller (born February 4, 1977) is a former Canadian professional indoor lacrosse player. He played for the Buffalo Bandits, Anaheim Storm, Arizona Sting, Calgary Roughnecks and Edmonton Rush in the National Lacrosse League.

Seller was a member of the Canada men's national lacrosse team, winning gold at the 2006 World Lacrosse Championship and silver at the 2002 World Lacrosse Championship.
