= Portland LumberJax =

Former NLL professional box lacrosse team

- Nickname: Jax
- Sport: Box lacrosse
- Founded: 2005
- Disbanded: 2009
- League: National Lacrosse League
- Division: Western
- Location: Portland, Oregon
- Arena: Rose Garden
- Colors: Black, Gold, Red, White
- Head coach: Derek Keenan
- General manager: Derek Keenan
- Championships: 0
- Division titles: 1 (2006)
- Local media: TV Comcast SportsNet

The Portland LumberJax (sometimes referred to as the Jax) were a professional box lacrosse team based in Portland, Oregon, which played in the National Lacrosse League (NLL) starting in the 2006 season and ending operations after the 2009 season. Angela Batinovich, the owner of the team, entered the league as the youngest owner of a professional sports franchise at the age of 24. Announced by the NLL on May 11, 2005, the LumberJax played their home games at the Rose Garden. It was announced on May 4, 2009 that the team would be leaving Portland after four seasons of play and on July 7, 2009 the NLL held a dispersal draft for the Lumberjax players.

== Franchise history ==
The expansion LumberJax got off to a slow start in their first year, but later turned their season around and made it to the playoffs with an 11-5 record. The LumberJax finished first in their division, becoming the only expansion team to win their division in the 20-year history of the NLL. The LumberJax season ended with a loss in the opening round of the playoffs to the Arizona Sting.

The LumberJax were less successful in their sophomore season, finishing last in the West Division with a 4-12 record.

In their third year, the LumberJax finished with a sub-500 record for the second straight year (6-10), but were able to enter the playoffs as the fourth-seed in the West.

The LumberJax won their first playoff game in franchise history on May 4, 2008, an 18-16 victory over the San Jose Stealth at the HP Pavilion in San Jose, California. Dan Dawson scored 7 goals and added 5 assists for a total of 12 points. They then defeated the Calgary Roughnecks in the Western Division Final 16-12, to earn their first ever trip to the Champion's Cup, which took place Saturday, May 17, 2008 at the HSBC Arena in Buffalo, New York against the Buffalo Bandits at 7:30 PM Eastern. The LumberJax lost 14-13.

On May 4, 2009 the team announced it would be leaving Portland after four seasons of play due to financial concerns. Future options included moving the franchise to another city or selling it to new owners; however on July 7, 2009, a dispersal draft was held for Portland's players, essentially shutting down the franchise.

== Awards and honors ==
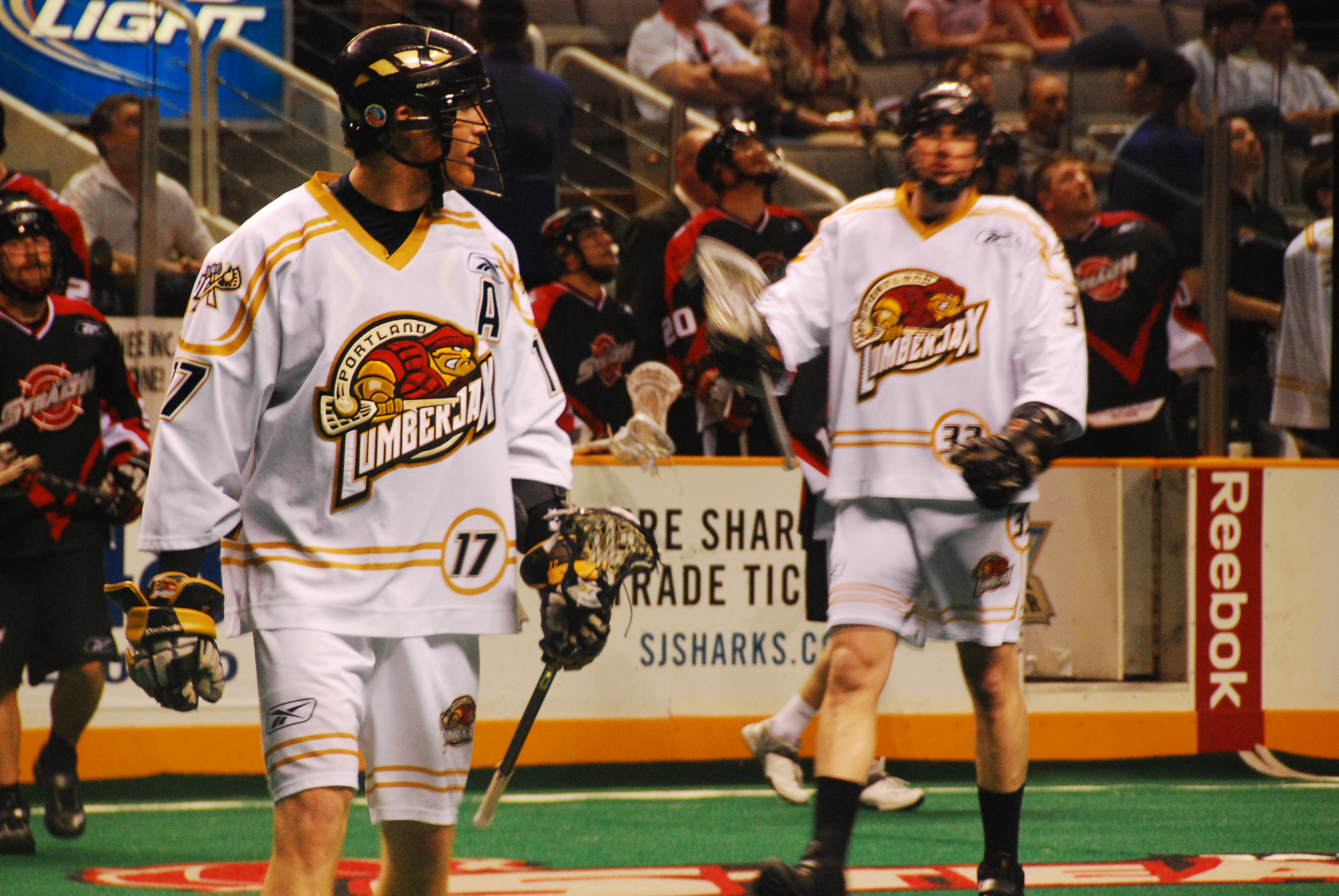
Brodie Merrill (left) and Richard Morgan (right) in 2008

Year	Player	Award
2006	Brodie Merrill	Rookie of the Year
2006	Brodie Merrill	Defensive Player of the Year
2006	Derek Keenan	Les Bartley Award
2006	Derek Keenan	GM of the Year
2006	Angela Batinovich	Executive of the Year

== All-time record ==
Season	Division	W-L	Finish	Home	Road	GF	GA	Coach	Playoffs
2006	Western	11–5	1st	5–3	6–2	188	177	Derek Keenan	Lost in Division semifinals
2007	Western	4–12	6th	3–5	1–7	153	199	Derek Keenan	Missed playoffs
2008	Western	6–10	4th	3–5	3–5	179	194	Derek Keenan	Lost in Championship Game
2009	Western	9–7	2nd	5–3	4–4	181	177	Derek Keenan	Lost in Division semifinals
Total	4 seasons	30–34		16–16	14–18	701	747		
Playoff totals	3 appearances	2–3		0–2	2–1	61	62		

== Playoff results ==
Season	Game	Visiting	Home
2006	Division Semifinals	Arizona 14	Portland 11
2008	Division Semifinal	Portland 18	San Jose 16
2008	Division Final	Portland 16	Calgary 12
2008	Championship	Portland 13	Buffalo 14
2009	Division Semifinal	San Jose 20	Portland 16

== See also ==
- Portland LumberJax seasons
- Portland LumberJax players
