= New York Titans (lacrosse) =

Former NLL professional box lacrosse team

- Sport: Box lacrosse
- Founded: 2006
- Last season: 2009
- League: National Lacrosse League
- Division: Eastern
- Based in: New York City
- Arena: Madison Square Garden; Nassau Veterans Memorial Coliseum; Prudential Center
- Colors: Orange, Blue
- Head coach: Ed Comeau
- Manager: Ed Comeau
- Division titles: 1 (2009)
- Finals appearances: 1 (2009)
- Later: Orlando Titans (2010)

The New York Titans were a professional lacrosse team based in the New York metropolitan area. The team was a member of the Eastern Division of the National Lacrosse League from 2006 to 2009. On August 11, 2009, the National Lacrosse League confirmed that the franchise would relocate to Orlando, Florida and become the Orlando Titans.

In their three seasons in the NLL, the Titans alternated their home games between several sporting venues. During the 2007 season, the Titans played four of their eight home games at Madison Square Garden, and the other four at Nassau Veterans Memorial Coliseum. For the 2008 season, the team played all of its home games at Madison Square Garden, while playing one game at a neutral site at the Sovereign Bank Arena in Trenton, NJ. In 2009, the Titans' home schedule consisted of two games at the Garden, five games at the Prudential Center in Newark, New Jersey and one game at the BankAtlantic Center in Florida.

== History ==
In 2006, the NLL announced the league's expansion into the New York City and Chicago markets with New York's ownership group being composed of principal owner Gary Rosenbach and including William E. Ford, Mark H. Ford, Nick Leone, Flip Huffard and Richard Ullmann. The announcement marked the return of the NLL to the New York after the demise of the New York Saints. On September 13, 2006, following an online poll, the franchise was dubbed the New York Titans. The Titans home games would be played at Madison Square Garden and Nassau Veterans Memorial Coliseum.

=== Inaugural season ===
On January 6, 2007, the Titans played their first franchise game against their fellow expansion team Shamrox in Chicago, Illinois. Gewas Schindler scored the first goal in the team's history; however, the Shamrox defeated the Titans 15–12. Following a two-game losing streak, the Titans defeated the Shamrox 11–9 for their first franchise and home victory. The game also marked the first lacrosse game to be played in Madison Square Garden's history. The team completed the season in last place with a 4–12 record. Following the 2006–2007 season, Daniel resigned as team president and governor and Timothy Kelly was named the team's new chief operating officer.

=== 2008 season ===
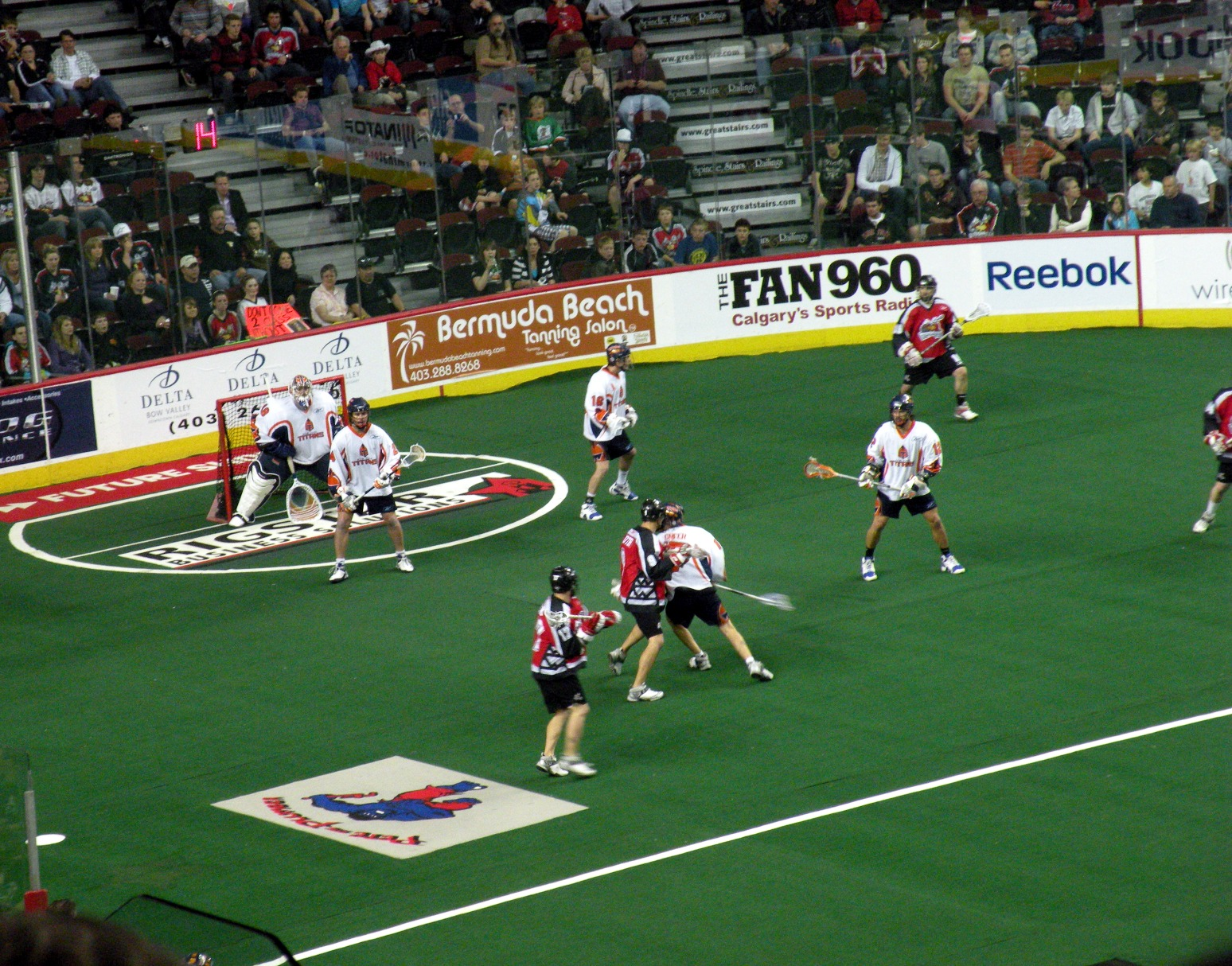
The Titans defending against the Calgary Roughnecks during the NLL Championship game in 2009

After opening the 2008 season with a 1–4 record, the Titans rebounded and ended the season with a 10–6 record. The team finished in a four-way tie for the best record in the league with Buffalo, Minnesota, and Philadelphia. Due to the NLL's tiebreaker rules and procedures, the Titans finished third in the division and league standings, but secured their first playoff berth in franchise history. The Titans advanced to the NLL Eastern Division Final, defeating the Minnesota Swarm 11–8, however, lost 19–12 to eventual Champion's Cup-winners the Buffalo Bandits.

Following the season, head coach Adam Mueller was awarded the Les Bartley Award for coach of the year. Mueller soon after announced his retirement from coaching, and former Rochester Knighthawks coach Ed Comeau was hired as the head coach for the 2009 season.

=== 2009 championship runners-up ===
With new head coach Ed Comeau, the Titans finished on top of the Eastern Division standings with a 10–6 record. They would later defeat the Rochester Knighthawks and returning Champion Cup winners the Buffalo Bandits to advance to the Champion's Cup, The Titans lost 12–10 to the Calgary Roughnecks in the championship game.

== All-time record ==
Season	Division	W–L	Finish	Win %	Home	Road	GF	GA	Coach	Playoffs
2007	Eastern	4–12	7th	.250	3–5	1–7	195	233	Adam Mueller	Did not qualify
2008	Eastern	10–6	3rd	.625	5–1	5–5	197	186	Adam Mueller	Lost East Division Final
2009	Eastern	10–6	1st	.625	5–3	5–3	190	180	Ed Comeau	Lost NLL Championship
Total	3 seasons	24–24		.500	13–9	11–15	582	599	2 Coaches	0 Championships
Playoff Totals	2 appearances	3–2		.600	2–0	1–2	53	52	2 Coaches	0 Championships

== Awards & honors ==
Year	Player	Award
2009	Ed Comeau	GM of the Year
2008	Adam Mueller	Les Bartley Award

== Playoff results ==
Season	Game	Visiting	Home
2008	East Division Semi-Final	New York 11	Minnesota 8
2008	East Division Final	New York 12	Buffalo 19
2009	East Division Semi-Final	Rochester 10	New York 11
2009	East Division Final	Buffalo 3	New York 9
2009	NLL Championship	New York 10	Calgary 12

== Head coaching history ==
#	Name	Term	Regular Season				Playoffs			
#	Name	Term	GC	W	L	W%	GC	W	L	W%
1	Adam Mueller	2007–2008	32	14	18	.438	2	1	1	.500
2	Ed Comeau	2009	16	10	6	.625	3	2	1	.667

== Attendance ==
Year	Played	Game#1	Game#2	Game#3	Game#4	Game#5	Game#6	Game#7	Game#8	Average	Total
2007	8Home	A-13,127	B-5,338	A-7,026	B-7,147	A-7,434	A-7,012	B-7,746	B-6,432	7,657	61,262
2008	6Home	A-7,332	A-6,742	C-5,239	A-6,337	A-5,379	A-8,026	E-Sold	E-Sold	6,509	39,055
2009	8Home	F-5,733	D-3,208	D-4,231	A-5,187	A-5,487	D-3,287	D-4,187	D-6,222	4,693	37,542

- A - Madison Square Garden, NY. Capacity: 18,200
- B - Nassau Coliseum, NY. Capacity: 16,234
- C - Sovereign Bank Arena, NJ. Capacity: 8,100
- D - Prudential Center, NJ. Capacity: 17,625
- E - Sold. Game sold to another team.
- F - Promotion game. Played out of the tri-state area.

== Draft history ==
=== NLL Entry Draft ===
First Round Selections

- 2006: Brendan Mundorf (11th overall)
- 2007: Jordan Hall (1st overall), Mitch Belisle (13th overall)
- 2008: None

== See also ==
- New York Titans seasons
- Orlando Titans
