= 2007 Chicago Shamrox season =

2007 Chicago Shamrox
- League: NLL
- Division: 5th East
- 2007 record: 6-10
- Home record: 4-4
- Road record: 2-6
- Goals for: 176
- Goals against: 191
- General Manager: Jamie Batley
- Coach: Jamie Batley
- Captain: Mat Giles
- Arena: Sears Centre
- Average attendance: 8,639

Team leaders
- Goals: Chris Panos (30)
- Assists: Jason Clark (41)
- Points: Jason Clark (58)
- Penalties in minutes: Cam Woods (50)
- Loose Balls: Brian Kazarian (151)
- Wins: Brandon Miller (6)
- Goals against average: Brandon Miller (12.28)

The Chicago Shamrox were a professional lacrosse team based in Chicago, Illinois, that played in the National Lacrosse League (NLL). The 2007 season was the Shamrox inaugural season. The franchise was awarded to the city of Chicago by the NLL on February 16, 2006, and the name "Shamrox" was chosen in May 2006.

Their first season started off with two consecutive wins, but after splitting the next two games, the Shamrox lost nine of the next ten games (including seven in a row) to finish with a 6–10 record. The Toronto Rock and Philadelphia Wings also had 6-10 records, but the Rock won the tiebreakers and made the playoffs while the Shamrox and Wings were eliminated.

== Regular season ==
=== Conference standings ===
East Division
P	Team	GP	W	L	PCT	GB	Home	Road	GF	GA	Diff	GF/GP	GA/GP
1	Rochester Knighthawks – xyz	16	14	2	.875	0.0	8–0	6–2	249	194	+55	15.56	12.12
2	Buffalo Bandits – x	16	10	6	.625	4.0	6–2	4–4	207	188	+19	12.94	11.75
3	Minnesota Swarm – x	16	9	7	.562	5.0	4–4	5–3	200	207	−7	12.50	12.94
4	Toronto Rock – x	16	6	10	.375	8.0	3–5	3–5	187	183	+4	11.69	11.44
5	Chicago Shamrox	16	6	10	.375	8.0	4–4	2–6	176	191	−15	11.00	11.94
6	Philadelphia Wings	16	6	10	.375	8.0	4–4	2–6	178	186	−8	11.12	11.62
7	New York Titans	16	4	12	.250	10.0	3–5	1–7	195	233	−38	12.19	14.56

West Division
P	Team	GP	W	L	PCT	GB	Home	Road	GF	GA	Diff	GF/GP	GA/GP
1	Colorado Mammoth – xy	16	12	4	.750	0.0	7–1	5–3	209	179	+30	13.06	11.19
2	Calgary Roughnecks – x	16	9	7	.562	3.0	4–4	5–3	219	202	+17	13.69	12.62
3	Arizona Sting – x	16	9	7	.562	3.0	6–2	3–5	188	181	+7	11.75	11.31
4	San Jose Stealth – x	16	9	7	.562	3.0	4–4	5–3	181	170	+11	11.31	10.62
5	Edmonton Rush	16	6	10	.375	6.0	4–4	2–6	160	189	−29	10.00	11.81
6	Portland LumberJax	16	4	12	.250	8.0	3–5	1–7	153	199	−46	9.56	12.44

x: Clinched playoff berth; c: Clinched playoff berth by crossing over to another division; y: Clinched division; z: Clinched best regular season record; GP: Games Played
W: Wins; L: Losses; GB: Games back; PCT: Win percentage; Home: Record at Home; Road: Record on the Road; GF: Goals scored; GA: Goals allowed
Differential: Difference between goals scored and allowed; GF/GP: Average number of goals scored per game; GA/GP: Average number of goals allowed per game

=== Game log ===
Game	Date	Opponent	Location	Score	OT	Attendance	Record
1	January 6, 2007	New York Titans	Sears Centre	W 15–12		8,456	1–0
2	January 13, 2007	@ Minnesota Swarm	Xcel Energy Center	W 11–10		10,544	2–0
3	January 20, 2007	@ New York Titans	Madison Square Garden	L 9–11		13,127	2–1
4	January 26, 2007	@ San Jose Stealth	HP Pavilion at San Jose	W 11–10		7,941	3–1
5	February 3, 2007	@ Rochester Knighthawks	Blue Cross Arena	L 8–13		8,618	3–2
6	February 11, 2007	Buffalo Bandits	Sears Centre	L 11–12		5,010	3–3
7	February 18, 2007	@ Toronto Rock	Air Canada Centre	L 10–11		15,200	3–4
8	February 24, 2007	Minnesota Swarm	Sears Centre	L 11–19		6,101	3–5
9	March 2, 2007	@ Arizona Sting	Jobing.com Arena	L 7–11		6,244	3–6
10	March 17, 2007	Rochester Knighthawks	Sears Centre	L 12–15		8,017	3–7
11	March 24, 2007	@ Philadelphia Wings	Wachovia Center	L 11–12		12,132	3–8
12	March 25, 2007	New York Titans	Sears Centre	W 12–8		3,854	4–8
13	March 31, 2007	@ Buffalo Bandits	HSBC Arena	L 10–15		16,228	4–9
14	April 1, 2007	Edmonton Rush	Sears Centre	L 6–8		4,665	4–10
15	April 7, 2007	Toronto Rock	Sears Centre	W 15–13		5,007	5–10
16	April 14, 2007	Philadelphia Wings	Sears Centre	W 17–11		7,092	6–10

== Player stats ==
=== Runners (Top 10) ===
Note: GP = Games played; G = Goals; A = Assists; Pts = Points; LB = Loose Balls; PIM = Penalty minutes

Player	GP	G	A	Pts	LB	PIM
Jason Clark	15	17	41	58	78	8
Chris Panos	16	30	19	49	31	30
Mat Giles	16	17	30	47	87	38
Josh Wasson	16	20	22	42	65	6
Bill McGlone	16	22	18	40	70	4
Jon Harasym	11	8	26	34	58	14
Thomas Montour	16	11	18	29	107	10
Cody Jacobs	11	14	8	22	19	8
Cam Woods	16	5	15	20	122	50
Totals		277	453	383	1092	46

=== Goaltenders ===
Note: GP = Games played; MIN = Minutes; W = Wins; L = Losses; GA = Goals against; Sv% = Save percentage; GAA = Goals against average

Player	GP	MIN	W	L	GA	Sv%	GAA
Brandon Miller	16	865:07	6	9	177	.773	12.28
Derek Collins	16	93:07	0	1	12	.789	7.73
Totals			6	10	191	.772	11.94

== Awards ==
Player	Award
Bill McGlone	All-Rookie Team
Cam Woods	All-Stars
Brandon Miller	All-Stars

== Transactions ==
=== Trades ===
March 20, 2007	To Chicago Shamrox Rusty Kruger	To Toronto Rock conditional fourth or fifth round pick, 2008 entry draft

== Roster ==
No.		Position	Player
25	(Canada)	Def	Candy, Drew
13	(Canada)	Fwd	Clark, Jason
43	(Canada)	Goalie	Collins, Derek
42	(Canada)	Fwd	Derks, Jonas
7	(Canada)	Def	Dupont, Kyle
57		?	Gallagher, Ryan
19	(Canada)	Def	Gibson, Darryl
27	(Canada)	Fwd	Giles, Mat
16	(Canada)	Fwd	Harasym, Jon
41	(United States)	Def	Heffner, Zach
11	(Canada)	Fwd	Hobbins, Mike
88	(Haudenosaunee)	Fwd	Jacobs, Cody
9	(Canada)	Trans	Kazarian, Bryan

No.		Position	Player
26	(Canada)	Def	Kirk, Mike
20	(Canada)	Fwd	Kruger, Rusty
91	(Canada)	Fwd	Leigh, Cory
12		Fwd	Leveille, Kevin
4	(Canada)	Def	Livingstone, Carter
		?	Marchildon, Matt
33	(United States)	Fwd	McGlone, Bill
35	(Canada)	Goalie	Miller, Brandon
	(Canada)	Fwd	Montgomery, Phil
63	(Haudenosaunee)	Fwd	Montour, Thomas
55	(United States)	Fwd	Panos, Chris
18	(United States)	Fwd	Wasson, Josh
22	(Canada)	Def	Woods, Cam

== See also ==
- 2007 NLL season
- Chicago Shamrox
