= 2008 Chicago Shamrox season =

2008 Chicago Shamrox
- League: NLL
- Division: 7th East
- 2008 record: 6-10
- Home record: 3-5
- Road record: 3-5
- Goals for: 176
- Goals against: 212
- General Manager: Jamie Batley
- Coach: Jamie Batley
- Captain: Mat Giles
- Alternate captains: Scott Self
- Arena: Sears Centre
- Average attendance: 7,694

Team leaders
- Goals: Mat Giles (27)
- Assists: Jason Clark (42)
- Points: Jason Clark (53)
- Penalties in minutes: Drew Candy (50)
- Loose Balls: Thomas Montour (102)
- Wins: Matt Roik (5)
- Goals against average: Derek Collins (10.48)

The Chicago Shamrox were a lacrosse team based in Chicago playing in the National Lacrosse League (NLL). The 2008 season was the second and final in franchise history. The season ended up almost the same as the 2007 season, with the Shamrox 6-10 and out of the playoffs.

== Regular season ==
=== Conference standings ===
East Division
P	Team	GP	W	L	PCT	GB	Home	Road	GF	GA	Diff	GF/GP	GA/GP
1	Buffalo Bandits – xyz	16	10	6	.625	0.0	7–2	3–4	203	174	+29	12.69	10.88
2	Minnesota Swarm – x	16	10	6	.625	0.0	6–2	4–4	199	196	+3	12.44	12.25
3	New York Titans – x	16	10	6	.625	0.0	5–1	5–5	197	186	+11	12.31	11.62
4	Philadelphia Wings – x	16	10	6	.625	0.0	7–1	3–5	225	220	+5	14.06	13.75
5	Rochester Knighthawks	16	8	8	.500	2.0	4–4	4–4	197	171	+26	12.31	10.69
6	Toronto Rock	16	7	9	.438	3.0	4–5	3–4	172	174	−2	10.75	10.88
7	Chicago Shamrox	16	6	10	.375	4.0	3–5	3–5	176	212	−36	11.00	13.25

West Division
P	Team	GP	W	L	PCT	GB	Home	Road	GF	GA	Diff	GF/GP	GA/GP
1	San Jose Stealth – xy	16	9	7	.562	0.0	4–4	5–3	185	172	+13	11.56	10.75
2	Colorado Mammoth – x	16	9	7	.562	0.0	6–2	3–5	184	167	+17	11.50	10.44
3	Calgary Roughnecks – x	16	7	9	.438	2.0	5–3	2–6	183	178	+5	11.44	11.12
4	Portland LumberJax – x	16	6	10	.375	3.0	3–5	3–5	179	194	−15	11.19	12.12
5	Edmonton Rush	16	4	12	.250	5.0	3–5	1–7	141	197	−56	8.81	12.31

x: Clinched playoff berth; c: Clinched playoff berth by crossing over to another division; y: Clinched division; z: Clinched best regular season record; GP: Games Played
W: Wins; L: Losses; GB: Games back; PCT: Win percentage; Home: Record at Home; Road: Record on the Road; GF: Goals scored; GA: Goals allowed
Differential: Difference between goals scored and allowed; GF/GP: Average number of goals scored per game; GA/GP: Average number of goals allowed per game

=== Game log ===
Game	Date	Opponent	Location	Score	OT	Attendance	Record
1	January 5, 2008	Toronto Rock	Sears Centre	L 9–11		6,116	0–1
2	January 12, 2008	@ Philadelphia Wings	Wachovia Center	L 11–19		11,974	0–2
3	January 26, 2008	Edmonton Rush	Sears Centre	W 17–11		5,107	1–2
4	February 9, 2008	@ San Jose Stealth	HP Pavilion at San Jose	L 11–17		2,514	1–3
5	February 16, 2008	New York Titans	Sears Centre	L 9–14		4,427	1–4
6	February 24, 2008	Buffalo Bandits	Sears Centre	L 8–13		3,250	1–5
7	March 1, 2008	Rochester Knighthawks	Sears Centre	L 8–18		5,335	1–6
8	March 14, 2008	@ Minnesota Swarm	Xcel Energy Center	L 9–13		13,004	1–7
9	March 22, 2008	@ Rochester Knighthawks	Blue Cross Arena	W 12–11		10,221	2–7
10	March 29, 2008	Minnesota Swarm	Sears Centre	W 15–10		4,036	3–7
11	April 5, 2008	Philadelphia Wings	Sears Centre	W 15–14	OT	5,427	4–7
12	April 12, 2008	@ Toronto Rock	Air Canada Centre	W 13–12	OT	15,238	5–7
13	April 18, 2008	@ New York Titans	Madison Square Garden	L 7–14		5,379	5–8
14	April 19, 2008	@ Buffalo Bandits	HSBC Arena	L 9–13		13,633	5–9
15	April 25, 2008	@ Minnesota Swarm	Xcel Energy Center	W 12–10		11,439	6–9
16	April 26, 2008	Minnesota Swarm	Sears Centre	L 11–12		6,014	6–10

== Player stats ==
=== Runners (Top 10) ===
Note: GP = Games played; G = Goals; A = Assists; Pts = Points; LB = Loose balls; PIM = Penalty minutes

Player	GP	G	A	Pts	LB	PIM
Jason Clark	15	11	42	53	65	4
Mat Giles	16	27	23	50	71	45
Jonas Derks	13	19	29	48	46	10
Cody Jacobs	10	19	18	37	24	6
Josh Wasson	16	12	19	31	68	6
Callum Crawford	12	14	13	27	37	4
Lindsay Plunkett	6	11	11	22	27	2
Bill McGlone	15	10	11	21	60	6
Bobby McBride	13	8	13	21	73	5
Totals		268	444	349	1101	29

=== Goaltenders ===
Note: GP = Games played; MIN = Minutes; W = Wins; L = Losses; GA = Goals against; Sv% = Save percentage; GAA = Goals against average

Player	GP	MIN	W	L	GA	Sv%	GAA
Matt Roik	8	497:25	5	3	102	.788	12.30
Brandon Miller	3	228:49	1	2	65	.707	17.04
Derek Collins	5	234:41	0	5	41	.777	10.48
Totals	16		6	10	212	.762	13.25

== Awards ==
Player	Award
Scott Self	All-Star
Scott Self	Second Team All-Pro

== Transactions ==
=== Trades ===
February 5, 2008	To Chicago Shamrox two second-round picks, 2008 entry draft	To Buffalo Bandits Andrew Lazore; Rusty Kruger
March 5, 2008	To Chicago Shamrox conditional third-round pick, 2008 entry draft conditional third-round pick, 2009 entry draft	To Edmonton Rush Lindsay Plunkett
March 5, 2008	To Chicago Shamrox Matt Roik; Brad Self first-round pick, 2009 entry draft second-round pick, 2010 entry draft	To Philadelphia Wings Brandon Miller second-round pick, 2008 entry draft

== Roster ==
No.		Position	Player
24	(Canada)	Def	Boyle, Brock
37	(Canada)	Trans	Burkholder, Andrew
25	(Canada)	Def	Candy, Drew
13	(Canada)	Fwd	Clark, Jason
43	(Canada)	Goalie	Collins, Derek
23	(Canada)	Fwd	Crawford, Callum
		?	Dasinger, Matt
		?	Deane, Jake
42	(Canada)	Fwd	Derks, Jonas
	(Canada)	Def	Dupont, Kyle
17	(Canada)	Def	Fines, Kevin
	(Canada)	Def	Gibson, Darryl
27	(Canada)	Fwd	Giles, Mat
11	(Canada)	Fwd	Hobbins, Mike
88	(Haudenosaunee)	Fwd	Jacobs, Cody
9	(Canada)	Trans	Kazarian, Bryan
26	(Canada)	Def	Kirk, Mike

No.		Position	Player
	(Canada)	Fwd	Kruger, Rusty
	(Haudenosaunee)	Fwd	Lazore, Andrew
		?	Leveille, Kevin
4	(Canada)	Def	Livingstone, Carter
44	(Canada)	Trans	McBride, Bobby
33	(United States)	Fwd	McGlone, Bill
	(Canada)	Goalie	Miller, Brandon
63	(United States)	Fwd	Montour, Thomas
21		?	OBrien, Mack
	(United States)	Fwd	Panos, Chris
	(Canada)	Fwd	Plunkett, Lindsay
35	(Canada)	Goalie	Roik, Matt
71	(Canada)	?	Ross, Kevin
12	(Canada)	Fwd	Self, Brad
6	(Canada)	Def	Self, Scott
		?	Stringer, Cory
18	(United States)	Fwd	Wasson, Josh

== See also ==
- 2008 NLL season
