= 2007 San Jose Stealth season =

2007 San Jose Stealth
- League: NLL
- Division: 4th West
- 2007 record: 9-7
- Home record: 4-4
- Road record: 5-3
- Goals for: 181
- Goals against: 170
- General Manager: Walt Christianson
- Coach: Johnny Mouradian
- Arena: HP Pavilion at San Jose
- Average attendance: 4,677

Team leaders
- Goals: Jeff Zywicki (40)
- Assists: Colin Doyle (59)
- Points: Luke Wiles (82)
- Penalties in minutes: Ian Hawksbee (46); Eric Martin (46)
- Loose Balls: Eric Martin (132)
- Wins: Anthony Cosmo (8)
- Goals against average: Anthony Cosmo (10.22)

The San Jose Stealth are a lacrosse team based in San Jose, California playing in the National Lacrosse League (NLL). The 2007 season was the 8th in franchise history and 4th as the Stealth (previously the Albany Attack).

After a 1-5 start, the Stealth won eight of their final ten games, and finished the season in 4th place with a 9-7 record. In the division semi-final, they defeated the division-winning Colorado Mammoth in overtime before losing to the Arizona Sting in the division finals.

== Regular season ==
=== Conference standings ===
East Division
P	Team	GP	W	L	PCT	GB	Home	Road	GF	GA	Diff	GF/GP	GA/GP
1	Rochester Knighthawks – xyz	16	14	2	.875	0.0	8–0	6–2	249	194	+55	15.56	12.12
2	Buffalo Bandits – x	16	10	6	.625	4.0	6–2	4–4	207	188	+19	12.94	11.75
3	Minnesota Swarm – x	16	9	7	.562	5.0	4–4	5–3	200	207	−7	12.50	12.94
4	Toronto Rock – x	16	6	10	.375	8.0	3–5	3–5	187	183	+4	11.69	11.44
5	Chicago Shamrox	16	6	10	.375	8.0	4–4	2–6	176	191	−15	11.00	11.94
6	Philadelphia Wings	16	6	10	.375	8.0	4–4	2–6	178	186	−8	11.12	11.62
7	New York Titans	16	4	12	.250	10.0	3–5	1–7	195	233	−38	12.19	14.56

West Division
P	Team	GP	W	L	PCT	GB	Home	Road	GF	GA	Diff	GF/GP	GA/GP
1	Colorado Mammoth – xy	16	12	4	.750	0.0	7–1	5–3	209	179	+30	13.06	11.19
2	Calgary Roughnecks – x	16	9	7	.562	3.0	4–4	5–3	219	202	+17	13.69	12.62
3	Arizona Sting – x	16	9	7	.562	3.0	6–2	3–5	188	181	+7	11.75	11.31
4	San Jose Stealth – x	16	9	7	.562	3.0	4–4	5–3	181	170	+11	11.31	10.62
5	Edmonton Rush	16	6	10	.375	6.0	4–4	2–6	160	189	−29	10.00	11.81
6	Portland LumberJax	16	4	12	.250	8.0	3–5	1–7	153	199	−46	9.56	12.44

x: Clinched playoff berth; c: Clinched playoff berth by crossing over to another division; y: Clinched division; z: Clinched best regular season record; GP: Games Played
W: Wins; L: Losses; GB: Games back; PCT: Win percentage; Home: Record at Home; Road: Record on the Road; GF: Goals scored; GA: Goals allowed
Differential: Difference between goals scored and allowed; GF/GP: Average number of goals scored per game; GA/GP: Average number of goals allowed per game

=== Game log ===
Game	Date	Opponent	Location	Score	OT	Attendance	Record
1	January 5, 2007	Rochester Knighthawks	HP Pavilion at San Jose	L 11–14		4,417	0–1
2	January 12, 2007	@ Calgary Roughnecks	Pengrowth Saddledome	W 17–16	OT	12,370	1–1
3	January 13, 2007	Arizona Sting	HP Pavilion at San Jose	L 11–14		3,678	1–2
4	January 20, 2007	@ Philadelphia Wings	Wachovia Center	L 8–9		9,737	1–3
5	January 26, 2007	Chicago Shamrox	HP Pavilion at San Jose	L 10–11		7,941	1–4
6	February 3, 2007	Calgary Roughnecks	HP Pavilion at San Jose	L 11–15		6,258	1–5
7	February 24, 2007	@ New York Titans	Madison Square Garden	W 12–11		7,147	2–5
8	March 2, 2007	@ Edmonton Rush	Rexall Place	W 11–9		9,388	3–5
9	March 17, 2007	Portland LumberJax	HP Pavilion at San Jose	W 17–8		4,435	4–5
10	March 24, 2007	@ Portland LumberJax	Rose Garden	W 9–7		6,322	5–5
11	March 25, 2007	Edmonton Rush	HP Pavilion at San Jose	W 14–7		3,552	6–5
12	March 31, 2007	@ Arizona Sting	Jobing.com Arena	L 9–10		4,565	6–6
13	April 6, 2007	@ Portland LumberJax	Rose Garden	W 9–8		6,748	7–6
14	April 7, 2007	Edmonton Rush	HP Pavilion at San Jose	W 9–8		3,845	8–6
15	April 12, 2007	@ Colorado Mammoth	Pepsi Center	L 12–13		16,012	8–7
16	April 13, 2007	Colorado Mammoth	HP Pavilion at San Jose	W 11–10		3,288	9–7

== Playoffs ==
=== Game log ===
Game	Date	Opponent	Location	Score	OT	Attendance	Record
Division Semifinal	April 21, 2007	@ Colorado Mammoth	Pepsi Center	W 15–14	OT	16,309	1–0
Division Final	April 28, 2007	@ Arizona Sting	Jobing.com Arena	L 7–9		6,924	1–1

== Player stats ==
=== Runners (Top 10) ===
Note: GP = Games played; G = Goals; A = Assists; Pts = Points; LB = Loose balls; PIM = Penalty minutes

Player	GP	G	A	Pts	LB	PIM
Luke Wiles	16	30	52	82	95	14
Colin Doyle	16	22	59	81	58	14
Gary Rosyski	16	34	42	76	66	17
Jeff Zywicki	14	40	30	70	107	2
Cam Sedgwick	16	11	28	39	57	8
Callum Crawford	13	10	13	23	44	21
Eric Martin	16	0	14	14	132	46
Curtis Hodgson	16	4	9	13	64	12
Kyle Sorensen	15	8	3	11	58	38
Totals		292	473	401	1040	56

=== Goaltenders ===
Note: GP = Games played; MIN = Minutes; W = Wins; L = Losses; GA = Goals against; Sv% = Save percentage; GAA = Goals against average

Player	GP	MIN	W	L	GA	Sv%	GAA
Anthony Cosmo	15	810:00	8	5	138	.792	10.22
Aaron Bold	13	158:31	1	2	32	.775	12.11
Paul Dawson	2	0:00	0	0	0	.000	.00
Totals			9	7	170	.789	10.63

== Transactions ==
=== Trades ===
February 7, 2007	To San Jose Stealth Andrew Burkholder first round pick, 2007 entry draft	To Colorado Mammoth Jim Moss

== Roster ==
No.		Position	Player
77	(Canada)	Goalie	Bold, Aaron
3	(United States)	Trans	Booth, Tim
37	(Canada)	Trans	Burkholder, Andrew
44	(Canada)	Goalie	Cosmo, Anthony
5	(Canada)	Fwd	Crawford, Callum
2	(Canada)	Goalie	Dawson, Paul
7	(Canada)	Fwd	Doyle, Colin
19	(United States)	Fwd	Green, Wes
4	(Canada)	Def	Guindon, Andrew
18	(Canada)	Def	Halls, Darren
88	(United States)	Trans	Hawksbee, Ian
6	(Canada)	Def	Hodgson, Curtis

No.		Position	Player
21	(United States)	Def	Holmes, Steve
25	(United States)	Def	Martin, Eric
8	(Canada)	Def	Mitchell, Sterling
	(Canada)	Def	Neufeld, Kyle
23	(Canada)	Fwd	Rosyski, Gary
20	(Canada)	Def	Santos, Shaydon
29	(Canada)	Fwd	Sedgwick, Cam
11	(Canada)	Def	Sorensen, Kyle
	(United States)	Trans	Vasold, Joe
		?	Wiles, Jason
15	(United States)	Fwd	Wiles, Luke
		?	Williams, Shawn
9	(Canada)	Fwd	Zywicki, Jeff

== See also ==
- 2007 NLL season
