= 2007 New York Titans season =

Harish Is cinematographer

2007 New York Titans
- League: NLL
- Division: 7th East
- 2007 record: 4-12
- Home record: 3-5
- Road record: 1-7
- Goals for: 195
- Goals against: 233
- General Manager: Adam Mueller
- Coach: Adam Mueller
- Captain: Casey Powell
- Arena: Madison Square Garden
- Average attendance: 7,658

Team leaders
- Goals: Pat Maddalena (40)
- Assists: Ryan Boyle (53)
- Points: Pat Maddalena (83)
- Penalties in minutes: Jarett Park (43)
- Loose Balls: Jarett Park (129)
- Wins: Matt Vinc (3)
- Goals against average: Matt Vinc (13.23)

The New York Titans are a professional lacrosse team based in New York, New York, that plays in the National Lacrosse League (NLL). The 2007 season was the Titans inaugural season. The franchise was announced by the NLL on July 11, 2006, and the name "Titans" was chosen in September 2006.

The Titans suffered through a rough inaugural season. After two losses, they won their first game at home against their expansion cousins, the Chicago Shamrox, but then lost the next six straight games. They did finish strong, however, winning two of their last three games, but finished well out of the playoffs.

== Regular season ==
=== Conference standings ===
East Division
P	Team	GP	W	L	PCT	GB	Home	Road	GF	GA	Diff	GF/GP	GA/GP
1	Rochester Knighthawks – xyz	16	14	2	.875	0.0	8–0	6–2	249	194	+55	15.56	12.12
2	Buffalo Bandits – x	16	10	6	.625	4.0	6–2	4–4	207	188	+19	12.94	11.75
3	Minnesota Swarm – x	16	9	7	.562	5.0	4–4	5–3	200	207	−7	12.50	12.94
4	Toronto Rock – x	16	6	10	.375	8.0	3–5	3–5	187	183	+4	11.69	11.44
5	Chicago Shamrox	16	6	10	.375	8.0	4–4	2–6	176	191	−15	11.00	11.94
6	Philadelphia Wings	16	6	10	.375	8.0	4–4	2–6	178	186	−8	11.12	11.62
7	New York Titans	16	4	12	.250	10.0	3–5	1–7	195	233	−38	12.19	14.56

West Division
P	Team	GP	W	L	PCT	GB	Home	Road	GF	GA	Diff	GF/GP	GA/GP
1	Colorado Mammoth – xy	16	12	4	.750	0.0	7–1	5–3	209	179	+30	13.06	11.19
2	Calgary Roughnecks – x	16	9	7	.562	3.0	4–4	5–3	219	202	+17	13.69	12.62
3	Arizona Sting – x	16	9	7	.562	3.0	6–2	3–5	188	181	+7	11.75	11.31
4	San Jose Stealth – x	16	9	7	.562	3.0	4–4	5–3	181	170	+11	11.31	10.62
5	Edmonton Rush	16	6	10	.375	6.0	4–4	2–6	160	189	−29	10.00	11.81
6	Portland LumberJax	16	4	12	.250	8.0	3–5	1–7	153	199	−46	9.56	12.44

x: Clinched playoff berth; c: Clinched playoff berth by crossing over to another division; y: Clinched division; z: Clinched best regular season record; GP: Games Played
W: Wins; L: Losses; GB: Games back; PCT: Win percentage; Home: Record at Home; Road: Record on the Road; GF: Goals scored; GA: Goals allowed
Differential: Difference between goals scored and allowed; GF/GP: Average number of goals scored per game; GA/GP: Average number of goals allowed per game

=== Game log ===
Game	Date	Opponent	Location	Score	OT	Attendance	Record
1	January 6, 2007	@ Chicago Shamrox	Sears Centre	L 12–15		8,456	0–1
2	January 12, 2007	@ Buffalo Bandits	HSBC Arena	L 14–16		18,690	0–2
3	January 20, 2007	Chicago Shamrox	Madison Square Garden	W 11–9		13,127	1–2
4	January 26, 2007	Philadelphia Wings	Madison Square Garden	L 11–16		5,338	1–3
5	January 27, 2007	@ Rochester Knighthawks	Blue Cross Arena	L 18–22		9,611	1–4
6	February 2, 2007	@ Arizona Sting	Jobing.com Arena	L 15–16		5,559	1–5
7	February 17, 2007	Minnesota Swarm	Madison Square Garden	L 14–15		7,026	1–6
8	February 18, 2007	@ Minnesota Swarm	Xcel Energy Center	L 14–17		9,056	1–7
9	February 24, 2007	San Jose Stealth	Madison Square Garden	L 11–12		7,147	1–8
10	March 3, 2007	Toronto Rock	Madison Square Garden	W 13–10		7,434	2–8
11	March 17, 2007	Buffalo Bandits	Madison Square Garden	L 8–11		7,012	2–9
12	March 24, 2007	Rochester Knighthawks	Madison Square Garden	L 15–21		7,746	2–10
13	March 25, 2007	@ Chicago Shamrox	Sears Centre	L 8–12		3,854	2–11
14	March 31, 2007	Edmonton Rush	Madison Square Garden	W 11–10		6,432	3–11
15	April 7, 2007	@ Philadelphia Wings	Wachovia Center	L 8–20		13,201	3–12
16	April 14, 2007	@ Toronto Rock	Air Canada Centre	W 12–11		16,054	4–12

== Player stats ==
=== Runners (Top 10) ===
Note: GP = Games played; G = Goals; A = Assists; Pts = Points; LB = Loose balls; PIM = Penalty minutes

Player	GP	G	A	Pts	LB	PIM
Pat Maddalena	16	40	43	83	99	6
Ryan Boyle	16	29	53	82	77	11
Casey Powell	13	29	51	80	90	22
Mike McLellan	16	26	18	44	49	0
Brendan Mundorf	14	23	21	44	50	12
Gewas Schindler	14	12	25	37	31	8
Jeff Spano	15	8	19	27	96	14
Jarett Park	16	6	13	19	129	43
Matt Zash	9	5	8	13	46	0
Totals		318	513	349	1082	53

=== Goaltenders ===
Note: GP = Games played; MIN = Minutes; W = Wins; L = Losses; GA = Goals against; Sv% = Save percentage; GAA = Goals against average

Player	GP	MIN	W	L	GA	Sv%	GAA
Matt Vinc	14	712:15	3	9	157	.727	13.23
Curtis Palidwor	6	163:27	1	1	44	.732	16.15
Nick Schroeder	10	81:22	0	2	30	.615	22.12
Erik Miller	2	0:00	0	0	0	.000	.00
Totals			4	12	233	.716	14.56

== Awards ==
Player	Award
Casey Powell	Second Team All-Pro
Casey Powell	All-Stars
Ryan Boyle	All-Stars

== Transactions ==
=== Trades ===
February 9, 2007	To New York Titans 1st round pick, 2007 entry draft	To Edmonton Rush Curtis Palidwor conditional 5th round pick, 2007 entry draft

== Roster ==
No.		Position	Player
7	(United States)	Def	Alrich, Matt
41	(United States)	Def	Barrett, Bryan
14	(United States)	Fwd	Boyle, Ryan
32	(United States)	Def	Brzeski, Rich
	(United States)	Fwd	Colsey, Roy
	(United States)	Def	Francey, Tyler
71	(United States)	Trans	Galbraith, Keevin
45	(United States)	Def	Ghedina, Joseph
4	(United States)	Def	Horsey, Bobby
34	(United States)	Def	Kelly, Anthony
42	(United States)	Fwd	Maddalena, Pat
19	(United States)	Fwd	McLellan, Mike
	(United States)	Trans	Miller, Blake

No.		Position	Player
0	(United States)	Goalie	Miller, Erik
2	(United States)	Fwd	Mundorf, Brendan
56		Def	Orsen, John
	(Canada)	Goalie	Palidwor, Curtis
12	(United States)	Def	Park, Jarett
20	(United States)	?	Peyser, Greg
1	(United States)	Fwd	Powell, Casey
24	(Haudenosaunee)	Fwd	Schindler, Gewas
65	(United States)	Goalie	Schroeder, Nick
47	(United States)	Def	Spano, Jeff
10	(United States)	Fwd	Tower, Brian
48	(United States)	Goalie	Vinc, Matt
15		Trans	Zash, Matt
		Fwd	Zummo, Tom

== See also ==
- 2007 NLL season
