= 2007 Buffalo Bandits season =

Lacrosse team season

2007 Buffalo Bandits
- League: NLL
- Division: 2nd East
- 2007 record: 10–6
- Home record: 6–2
- Road record: 4–4
- Goals for: 207
- Goals against: 188
- General Manager: Darris Kilgour
- Coach: Darris Kilgour
- Captain: Richie Kilgour
- Alternate captains: John Tavares
- Arena: HSBC Arena
- Average attendance: 12,760

Team leaders
- Goals: John Tavares (42)
- Assists: John Tavares (61)
- Points: John Tavares (103)
- Penalties in minutes: Kyle Laverty (66)
- Loose Balls: Pat McCready (126)
- Wins: Steve Dietrich (5); Mike Thompson (5)
- Goals against average: Steve Dietrich (11.54)

The Buffalo Bandits are a lacrosse team based in Buffalo, New York playing in the National Lacrosse League (NLL). The 2007 season was the franchise's 16th season, and was almost a repeat of their 2006 season. After winning the East with an 11–5 record in 2006, the Bandits finished 2nd with a 10–6 record in 2007. Once again, they dispatched Minnesota in the division semi-finals, 14–8, and once again met Rochester in the division finals. This time, however, Rochester would take the division on their way to the Championship, beating the Bandits 14–13, in overtime.

== Regular season ==
=== Conference standings ===
East Division
P	Team	GP	W	L	PCT	GB	Home	Road	GF	GA	Diff	GF/GP	GA/GP
1	Rochester Knighthawks – xyz	16	14	2	.875	0.0	8–0	6–2	249	194	+55	15.56	12.12
2	Buffalo Bandits – x	16	10	6	.625	4.0	6–2	4–4	207	188	+19	12.94	11.75
3	Minnesota Swarm – x	16	9	7	.562	5.0	4–4	5–3	200	207	−7	12.50	12.94
4	Toronto Rock – x	16	6	10	.375	8.0	3–5	3–5	187	183	+4	11.69	11.44
5	Chicago Shamrox	16	6	10	.375	8.0	4–4	2–6	176	191	−15	11.00	11.94
6	Philadelphia Wings	16	6	10	.375	8.0	4–4	2–6	178	186	−8	11.12	11.62
7	New York Titans	16	4	12	.250	10.0	3–5	1–7	195	233	−38	12.19	14.56

West Division
P	Team	GP	W	L	PCT	GB	Home	Road	GF	GA	Diff	GF/GP	GA/GP
1	Colorado Mammoth – xy	16	12	4	.750	0.0	7–1	5–3	209	179	+30	13.06	11.19
2	Calgary Roughnecks – x	16	9	7	.562	3.0	4–4	5–3	219	202	+17	13.69	12.62
3	Arizona Sting – x	16	9	7	.562	3.0	6–2	3–5	188	181	+7	11.75	11.31
4	San Jose Stealth – x	16	9	7	.562	3.0	4–4	5–3	181	170	+11	11.31	10.62
5	Edmonton Rush	16	6	10	.375	6.0	4–4	2–6	160	189	−29	10.00	11.81
6	Portland LumberJax	16	4	12	.250	8.0	3–5	1–7	153	199	−46	9.56	12.44

x: Clinched playoff berth; c: Clinched playoff berth by crossing over to another division; y: Clinched division; z: Clinched best regular season record; GP: Games Played
W: Wins; L: Losses; GB: Games back; PCT: Win percentage; Home: Record at Home; Road: Record on the Road; GF: Goals scored; GA: Goals allowed
Differential: Difference between goals scored and allowed; GF/GP: Average number of goals scored per game; GA/GP: Average number of goals allowed per game

=== Game log ===
Game	Date	Opponent	Location	Score	OT	Attendance	Record
1	December 30, 2007	@ Portland LumberJax	Rose Garden	L 10–11	OT	8,437	0–1
2	January 12, 2007	New York Titans	HSBC Arena	W 16–14		18,690	1–1
3	January 13, 2007	@ Colorado Mammoth	Pepsi Center	L 10–11	OT	16,523	1–2
4	January 20, 2007	Minnesota Swarm	HSBC Arena	W 22–13		12,883	2–2
5	February 2, 2007	Toronto Rock	HSBC Arena	L 10–14		13,659	2–3
6	February 3, 2007	@ Toronto Rock	Air Canada Centre	L 8–13		15,471	2–4
7	February 11, 2007	@ Chicago Shamrox	Sears Centre	W 12–11		5,010	3–4
8	February 17, 2007	@ Philadelphia Wings	Wachovia Center	W 12–8		12,688	4–4
9	February 24, 2007	Philadelphia Wings	HSBC Arena	W 13–12		14,882	5–4
10	March 4, 2007	@ Minnesota Swarm	Xcel Energy Center	W 16–15		7,504	6–4
11	March 17, 2007	@ New York Titans	Madison Square Garden	W 11–8		7,012	7–4
12	March 24, 2007	Colorado Mammoth	HSBC Arena	W 19–15		15,156	8–4
13	March 31, 2007	Chicago Shamrox	HSBC Arena	W 15–10		16,228	9–4
14	April 7, 2007	Arizona Sting	HSBC Arena	W 15–5		13,492	10–4
15	April 13, 2007	Rochester Knighthawks	HSBC Arena	L 10–14		15,334	10–5
16	April 14, 2007	@ Rochester Knighthawks	Blue Cross Arena	L 8–14		11,200	10–6

== Playoffs ==
=== Game log ===
Game	Date	Opponent	Location	Score	OT	Attendance	Record
Division Semifinal	April 22, 2007	Minnesota Swarm	HSBC Arena	W 14–8		9,003	1–0
Division Final	April 27, 2007	@ Rochester Knighthawks	Blue Cross Arena	L 13–14	OT	8,558	1–1

== Player stats ==
=== Runners (Top 10) ===
Note: GP = Games played; G = Goals; A = Assists; Pts = Points; LB = Loose Balls; PIM = Penalty minutes

Player	GP	G	A	Pts	LB	PIM
John Tavares	15	42	61	103	77	6
Kevin Dostie	16	29	33	62	96	15
Dan Teat	16	20	30	50	64	14
Mark Steenhuis	15	25	24	49	108	4
Cory Bomberry	15	16	33	49	46	13
Delby Powless	15	21	22	43	50	4
Brett Bucktooth	11	12	14	26	57	14
Jason Crosbie	12	11	14	25	53	8
Roger Vyse	12	12	12	24	46	0
Totals		310	517	381	1034	52

=== Goaltenders ===
Note: GP = Games played; MIN = Minutes; W = Wins; L = Losses; GA = Goals against; Sv% = Save percentage; GAA = Goals against average

Player	GP	MIN	W	L	GA	Sv%	GAA
Mike Thompson	16	511:39	5	4	103	.759	12.08
Steve Dietrich	14	431:22	5	2	83	.777	11.54
Daniel Sams	2	15:00	0	0	2	.778	8.00
Totals			10	6	188	.768	11.75

== Awards ==
Player	Award
Dave Zygaj	NLL Executive of the Year
John Tavares	First Team All-Pro
John Tavares	Overall player of the Month, March
John Tavares	All-Stars
Mark Steenhuis	All-Stars
Pat McCready	All-Stars

== Transactions ==
=== Trades ===
March 16, 2007	To Buffalo Bandits Phil Sanderson	To Toronto Rock first round pick, 2007 entry draft

== Roster ==
No.		Position	Player
72	(Haudenosaunee)	Fwd	Bomberry, Cory
2	(Canada)	Def	Bonterre, Troy
26	(Haudenosaunee)	Fwd	Bucktooth, Brett
27	(Canada)	Def	Couling, Kyle
54	(Canada)	Fwd	Crosbie, Jason
30	(Canada)	Goalie	Dietrich, Steve
51	(Canada)	Fwd	Dostie, Kevin
	(United States)	Fwd	Henderson, Tony
5	(Haudenosaunee)	Def	Hill, Clay
16	(Haudenosaunee)	Trans	Kilgour, Rich
17	(Canada)	Def	Laverty, Kyle
10	(Canada)	Trans	McCready, Pat

No.		Position	Player
99	(Haudenosaunee)	Fwd	Powless, Delby
86	(Canada)	Goalie	Sams, Daniel
18	(Canada)	Def	Sanderson, Phil
21	(Haudenosaunee)	Def	Seymour, Daryl
3	(Canada)	Def	Smith, Billy Dee
	(United States)	Def	Sorci, Tony
9	(Canada)	Trans	Steenhuis, Mark
11	(Canada)	Fwd	Tavares, John
15	(Canada)	Fwd	Teat, Dan
19	(Haudenosaunee)	Fwd	Thenhaus, Brenden
66	(Haudenosaunee)	Goalie	Thompson, Mike
81	(Haudenosaunee)	Fwd	Vyse, Roger
6	(Canada)	Def	White, Chris

== See also ==
- 2007 NLL season
