= 2007 Rochester Knighthawks season =

NLL team season

2007 Rochester Knighthawks
- Champion's Cup Champions
- East Division Champions
- League: NLL
- Division: 1st East
- 2007 record: 14-2
- Home record: 8-0
- Road record: 6-2
- Goals for: 249
- Goals against: 194
- General Manager: Jody Gage
- Coach: Ed Comeau
- Captain: Mike Hasen (injured); Regy Thorpe (acting)
- Alternate captains: Shawn Williams; John Grant, Jr.
- Arena: Blue Cross Arena
- Average attendance: 10,458

Team leaders
- Goals: John Grant, Jr. (51)
- Assists: John Grant, Jr. (60)
- Points: John Grant, Jr. (110)
- Penalties in minutes: Scott Ditzell (68)
- Loose Balls: Steve Toll (177)
- Wins: Pat O'Toole (13)
- Goals against average: Pat O'Toole (11.80)

The Rochester Knighthawks were a lacrosse team based in Rochester, New York that played in the National Lacrosse League (NLL). The 2007 season was the 13th in franchise history. Rochester started the season 2-2 but then won their last 12 consecutive regular season games. After defeating Toronto and Buffalo in the playoffs, they won the right to host the Championship game against Arizona. However, due to scheduling conflicts at the Blue Cross Arena, the Sting hosted the final game. The Knighthawks extended their winning streak by defeating the Sting 13-11 for their first NLL Championship since 1997.

The winning streak would continue into the 2008 season, but only by a single game.

== Regular season ==
=== Conference standings ===
East Division
P	Team	GP	W	L	PCT	GB	Home	Road	GF	GA	Diff	GF/GP	GA/GP
1	Rochester Knighthawks – xyz	16	14	2	.875	0.0	8–0	6–2	249	194	+55	15.56	12.12
2	Buffalo Bandits – x	16	10	6	.625	4.0	6–2	4–4	207	188	+19	12.94	11.75
3	Minnesota Swarm – x	16	9	7	.562	5.0	4–4	5–3	200	207	−7	12.50	12.94
4	Toronto Rock – x	16	6	10	.375	8.0	3–5	3–5	187	183	+4	11.69	11.44
5	Chicago Shamrox	16	6	10	.375	8.0	4–4	2–6	176	191	−15	11.00	11.94
6	Philadelphia Wings	16	6	10	.375	8.0	4–4	2–6	178	186	−8	11.12	11.62
7	New York Titans	16	4	12	.250	10.0	3–5	1–7	195	233	−38	12.19	14.56

West Division
P	Team	GP	W	L	PCT	GB	Home	Road	GF	GA	Diff	GF/GP	GA/GP
1	Colorado Mammoth – xy	16	12	4	.750	0.0	7–1	5–3	209	179	+30	13.06	11.19
2	Calgary Roughnecks – x	16	9	7	.562	3.0	4–4	5–3	219	202	+17	13.69	12.62
3	Arizona Sting – x	16	9	7	.562	3.0	6–2	3–5	188	181	+7	11.75	11.31
4	San Jose Stealth – x	16	9	7	.562	3.0	4–4	5–3	181	170	+11	11.31	10.62
5	Edmonton Rush	16	6	10	.375	6.0	4–4	2–6	160	189	−29	10.00	11.81
6	Portland LumberJax	16	4	12	.250	8.0	3–5	1–7	153	199	−46	9.56	12.44

x: Clinched playoff berth; c: Clinched playoff berth by crossing over to another division; y: Clinched division; z: Clinched best regular season record; GP: Games Played
W: Wins; L: Losses; GB: Games back; PCT: Win percentage; Home: Record at Home; Road: Record on the Road; GF: Goals scored; GA: Goals allowed
Differential: Difference between goals scored and allowed; GF/GP: Average number of goals scored per game; GA/GP: Average number of goals allowed per game

=== Game log ===
Game	Date	Opponent	Location	Score	OT	Attendance	Record
1	December 30, 2006	@ Colorado Mammoth	Pepsi Center	L 15–20		15,670	0–1
2	January 5, 2007	@ San Jose Stealth	HP Pavilion at San Jose	W 14–11		4,417	1–1
3	January 13, 2007	Toronto Rock	Blue Cross Arena	W 10–6		10,321	2–1
4	January 19, 2007	@ Minnesota Swarm	Xcel Energy Center	L 10–11		8,174	2–2
5	January 20, 2007	@ Toronto Rock	Air Canada Centre	W 19–15		16,882	3–2
6	January 27, 2007	New York Titans	Blue Cross Arena	W 22–18		9,611	4–2
7	February 3, 2007	Chicago Shamrox	Blue Cross Arena	W 13–8		8,618	5–2
8	February 17, 2007	Portland LumberJax	Blue Cross Arena	W 18–12		9,774	6–2
9	February 24, 2007	Arizona Sting	Blue Cross Arena	W 19–16		9,352	7–2
10	March 3, 2007	@ Philadelphia Wings	Wachovia Center	W 14–13		11,491	8–2
11	March 17, 2007	@ Chicago Shamrox	Sears Centre	W 15–12		8,017	9–2
12	March 24, 2007	@ New York Titans	Madison Square Garden	W 21–15		7,746	10–2
13	March 31, 2007	Philadelphia Wings	Blue Cross Arena	W 12–10		11,200	11–2
14	April 7, 2007	Minnesota Swarm	Blue Cross Arena	W 19–9		9,536	12–2
15	April 13, 2007	@ Buffalo Bandits	HSBC Arena	W 14–10		15,334	13–2
16	April 14, 2007	Buffalo Bandits	Blue Cross Arena	W 14–8		11,200	14–2

== Playoffs ==
=== Game log ===
Game	Date	Opponent	Location	Score	OT	Attendance	Record
Division Semifinal	April 20, 2007	Toronto Rock	Blue Cross Arena	W 10–6		7,003	1–0
Division Final	April 27, 2007	Buffalo Bandits	Blue Cross Arena	W 14–13	OT	8,558	2–0
Championship Game	May 12, 2007	@ Arizona Sting	Jobing.com Arena	W 13–11		9,796	3–0

== Player stats ==
=== Runners (Top 10) ===
Note: GP = Games played; G = Goals; A = Assists; Pts = Points; LB = Loose balls; PIM = Penalty minutes

Player	GP	G	A	Pts	LB	PIM
John Grant, Jr.	15	51	60	111	81	40
Shawn Williams	16	36	55	91	69	8
Scott Evans	16	45	42	87	78	48
Mike Accursi	16	26	51	77	69	0
Shawn Evans	16	32	34	66	121	36
Ken Millin	16	19	33	52	58	4
Steve Toll	16	14	24	38	177	2
Stephen Hoar	16	10	13	23	67	25
Bill Greer	13	7	11	18	106	17
Totals		387	636	459	1165	67

=== Goaltenders ===
Note: GP = Games played; MIN = Minutes; W = Wins; L = Losses; GA = Goals against; Sv% = Save percentage; GAA = Goals against average

Player	GP	MIN	W	L	GA	Sv%	GAA
Pat O'Toole	15	838:38	13	1	165	.774	11.80
Phil Wetherup	10	66:30	1	0	14	.791	12.63
Mike Miron	6	50:14	0	1	15	.674	17.92
Grant Crawley	1	0:00	0	0	0	.000	.00
Totals			14	2	194	.770	12.13

== Awards ==
Player	Award
John Grant, Jr.	NLL Most Valuable Player
Ed Comeau	Les Bartley Award
Steve Toll	NLL Transition Player of the Year
John Grant, Jr.	Patronage Game MVP
John Grant, Jr.	First Team All-Pro
Steve Toll	First Team All-Pro
Shawn Williams	Second Team All-Pro
John Grant, Jr.	All-Stars
Scott Evans	All-Stars
Shawn Williams	All-Stars
Steve Toll	All-Stars

== Roster ==
No.		Position	Player
43	(United States)	Def	Abrams, Marshall
44	(Canada)	Fwd	Accursi, Mike
26	(Canada)	Def	Brown, David
5	(Canada)	Def	Chapman, Sandy
42	(United States)	Def	Cougevan, Pat
41	(Canada)	Goalie	Crawley, Grant
12	(Canada)	Fwd	Croswell, Brian
25	(United States)	Def	Ditzell, Scott
7	(United States)	Def	Dutton, Pat
19	(Canada)	Fwd	Evans, Scott
15	(Canada)	Fwd	Evans, Shawn
36	(Canada)	Def	Forget, Luke

No.		Position	Player
24	(Canada)	Fwd	Grant Jr., John
20	(Canada)	Def	Greer, Bill
	(Canada)	Def	Hasen, Mike
23	(Canada)	Def	Hoar, Stephen
32	(Canada)	Fwd	Millin, Ken
	(Canada)	Goalie	Miron, Mike
39	(Canada)	Goalie	O'Toole, Pat
18	(United States)	Def	Reid, Jack
2	(United States)	Trans	Schiller, Chris
11	(United States)	Def	Thorpe, Regy
17	(Canada)	Trans	Toll, Steve
90	(Canada)	Goalie	Wetherup, Phil
51	(Canada)	Fwd	Williams, Shawn

== See also ==
- 2007 NLL season
