= 2007 Arizona Sting season =

2007 Arizona Sting
- League: NLL
- Division: 3rd West
- 2007 record: 9-7
- Home record: 6-2
- Road record: 3-5
- Goals for: 188
- Goals against: 181
- General Manager: Bob Hamley
- Coach: Bob Hamley
- Captain: Peter Lough
- Arena: Jobing.com Arena
- Average attendance: 8,720

Team leaders
- Goals: Dan Dawson (47)
- Assists: Dan Dawson (60)
- Points: Dan Dawson (107)
- Penalties in minutes: Peter Lough (47)
- Loose Balls: Peter Lough (118)
- Wins: Rob Blasdell (9)
- Goals against average: Rob Blasdell (10.94)

The Arizona Sting are a lacrosse team based in Phoenix, Arizona playing in the National Lacrosse League (NLL). The 2007 season was the 7th in franchise history and 4th as the Sting (formerly the Columbus Landsharks).

In 2007, the Sting finished 3rd in the west, but defeated both Calgary and San Jose in the playoffs to make it to the Championship game for the second time in three years. The East division champion Rochester Knighthawks won home field advantage but due to scheduling problems in Rochester, the Sting hosted the championship game. The Knighthawks defeated the Sting 13-11 to win their first NLL Championship in ten years.

== Regular season ==
=== Conference standings ===
East Division
| P | Team | GP | W | L | PCT | GB | Home | Road | GF | GA | Diff | GF/GP | GA/GP |
|---|---|---|---|---|---|---|---|---|---|---|---|---|---|
| 1 | Rochester Knighthawks – xyz | 16 | 14 | 2 | .875 | 0.0 | 8–0 | 6–2 | 249 | 194 | +55 | 15.56 | 12.12 |
| 2 | Buffalo Bandits – x | 16 | 10 | 6 | .625 | 4.0 | 6–2 | 4–4 | 207 | 188 | +19 | 12.94 | 11.75 |
| 3 | Minnesota Swarm – x | 16 | 9 | 7 | .562 | 5.0 | 4–4 | 5–3 | 200 | 207 | −7 | 12.50 | 12.94 |
| 4 | Toronto Rock – x | 16 | 6 | 10 | .375 | 8.0 | 3–5 | 3–5 | 187 | 183 | +4 | 11.69 | 11.44 |
| 5 | Chicago Shamrox | 16 | 6 | 10 | .375 | 8.0 | 4–4 | 2–6 | 176 | 191 | −15 | 11.00 | 11.94 |
| 6 | Philadelphia Wings | 16 | 6 | 10 | .375 | 8.0 | 4–4 | 2–6 | 178 | 186 | −8 | 11.12 | 11.62 |
| 7 | New York Titans | 16 | 4 | 12 | .250 | 10.0 | 3–5 | 1–7 | 195 | 233 | −38 | 12.19 | 14.56 |

West Division
| P | Team | GP | W | L | PCT | GB | Home | Road | GF | GA | Diff | GF/GP | GA/GP |
|---|---|---|---|---|---|---|---|---|---|---|---|---|---|
| 1 | Colorado Mammoth – xy | 16 | 12 | 4 | .750 | 0.0 | 7–1 | 5–3 | 209 | 179 | +30 | 13.06 | 11.19 |
| 2 | Calgary Roughnecks – x | 16 | 9 | 7 | .562 | 3.0 | 4–4 | 5–3 | 219 | 202 | +17 | 13.69 | 12.62 |
| 3 | Arizona Sting – x | 16 | 9 | 7 | .562 | 3.0 | 6–2 | 3–5 | 188 | 181 | +7 | 11.75 | 11.31 |
| 4 | San Jose Stealth – x | 16 | 9 | 7 | .562 | 3.0 | 4–4 | 5–3 | 181 | 170 | +11 | 11.31 | 10.62 |
| 5 | Edmonton Rush | 16 | 6 | 10 | .375 | 6.0 | 4–4 | 2–6 | 160 | 189 | −29 | 10.00 | 11.81 |
| 6 | Portland LumberJax | 16 | 4 | 12 | .250 | 8.0 | 3–5 | 1–7 | 153 | 199 | −46 | 9.56 | 12.44 |

x: Clinched playoff berth; c: Clinched playoff berth by crossing over to another division; y: Clinched division; z: Clinched best regular season record; GP: Games Played
W: Wins; L: Losses; GB: Games back; PCT: Win percentage; Home: Record at Home; Road: Record on the Road; GF: Goals scored; GA: Goals allowed
Differential: Difference between goals scored and allowed; GF/GP: Average number of goals scored per game; GA/GP: Average number of goals allowed per game

=== Game log ===
| Game | Date | Opponent | Location | Score | OT | Attendance | Record |
|---|---|---|---|---|---|---|---|
| 1 | January 5, 2007 | Colorado Mammoth | Jobing.com Arena | L 6–10 | | 7,179 | 0–1 |
| 2 | January 13, 2007 | @ San Jose Stealth | HP Pavilion at San Jose | W 14–11 | | 3,678 | 1–1 |
| 3 | January 19, 2007 | Portland LumberJax | Jobing.com Arena | W 11–4 | | 5,729 | 2–1 |
| 4 | January 20, 2007 | @ Portland LumberJax | Rose Garden | W 12–9 | | 9,238 | 3–1 |
| 5 | February 2, 2007 | New York Titans | Jobing.com Arena | W 16–15 | | 5,559 | 4–1 |
| 6 | February 10, 2007 | @ Edmonton Rush | Rexall Place | L 9–11 | | 10,435 | 4–2 |
| 7 | February 18, 2007 | Edmonton Rush | Jobing.com Arena | W 12–11 | OT | 7,063 | 5–2 |
| 8 | February 24, 2007 | @ Rochester Knighthawks | Blue Cross Arena | L 16–19 | | 9,352 | 5–3 |
| 9 | March 2, 2007 | Chicago Shamrox | Jobing.com Arena | W 11–7 | | 6,244 | 6–3 |
| 10 | March 16, 2007 | Calgary Roughnecks | Jobing.com Arena | W 14–10 | | 5,503 | 7–3 |
| 11 | March 24, 2007 | @ Calgary Roughnecks | Pengrowth Saddledome | L 12–14 | | 12,768 | 7–4 |
| 12 | March 30, 2007 | @ Colorado Mammoth | Pepsi Center | W 14–8 | | 18,027 | 8–4 |
| 13 | March 31, 2007 | San Jose Stealth | Jobing.com Arena | W 10–9 | | 4,565 | 9–4 |
| 14 | April 7, 2007 | @ Buffalo Bandits | HSBC Arena | L 5–15 | | 13,492 | 9–5 |
| 15 | April 13, 2007 | Calgary Roughnecks | Jobing.com Arena | L 11–12 | | 6,556 | 9–6 |
| 16 | April 14, 2007 | @ Minnesota Swarm | Xcel Energy Center | L 15–16 | | 14,144 | 9–7 |

== Playoffs ==
=== Game log ===
| Game | Date | Opponent | Location | Score | OT | Attendance | Record |
|---|---|---|---|---|---|---|---|
| Division Semifinal | April 21, 2007 | @ Calgary Roughnecks | Pengrowth Saddledome | W 13–9 | | 10,057 | 1–0 |
| Division Final | April 28, 2007 | San Jose Stealth | Jobing.com Arena | W 9–7 | | 6,924 | 2–0 |
| Championship Game | May 12, 2007 | Rochester Knighthawks | Jobing.com Arena | L 11–13 | | 9,796 | 2–1 |

== Player stats ==
=== Runners (Top 10) ===
Note: GP = Games played; G = Goals; A = Assists; Pts = Points; LB = Loose Balls; PIM = Penalty minutes

| Player | GP | G | A | Pts | LB | PIM |
|---|---|---|---|---|---|---|
| Dan Dawson | 16 | 47 | 60 | 107 | 65 | 16 |
| Craig Conn | 16 | 21 | 55 | 76 | 106 | 35 |
| Lindsay Plunkett | 16 | 31 | 35 | 66 | 75 | 20 |
| Derek Malawsky | 16 | 20 | 35 | 55 | 78 | 9 |
| Curt Malawsky | 15 | 24 | 21 | 45 | 38 | 4 |
| Matt Brown | 12 | 10 | 14 | 24 | 34 | 2 |
| Andy Secore | 14 | 10 | 12 | 22 | 47 | 8 |
| Scott Self | 16 | 3 | 14 | 17 | 91 | 21 |
| Peter Veltman | 9 | 4 | 10 | 14 | 17 | 12 |
| Totals | | 315 | 503 | 299 | 978 | 53 |

=== Goaltenders ===
Note: GP = Games played; MIN = Minutes; W = Wins; L = Losses; GA = Goals against; Sv% = Save percentage; GAA = Goals against average

| Player | GP | MIN | W | L | GA | Sv% | GAA |
|---|---|---|---|---|---|---|---|
| Rob Blasdell | 16 | 844:16 | 9 | 5 | 154 | .761 | 10.94 |
| Mike Attwood | 16 | 114:11 | 0 | 2 | 25 | .699 | 13.14 |
| Brandon Atherton | 0 | 0:00 | 0 | 0 | 0 | .000 | .00 |
| Totals | | | 9 | 7 | 181 | .752 | 11.31 |

== Awards ==
| Player | Award |
|---|---|
| Dan Dawson | First Team All-Pro |
| Rob Blasdell | Overall Player of the Month, January |
| Dan Dawson | All-Stars |
| Rob Blasdell | All-Stars |
| Peter Lough | All-Stars |

== Roster ==
| No. | | Position | Player |
|---|---|---|---|
| 30 | (Canada) | Goalie | Atherton, Brandon |
| 43 | (Canada) | Goalie | Attwood, Mike |
| 17 | (Canada) | Def | Beisel, Brian |
| 31 | (Canada) | Goalie | Blasdell, Rob |
| 16 | (Canada) | Fwd | Brown, Matt |
| 9 | (Canada) | Def | Codd, Bruce |
| 8 | (Canada) | Fwd | Conn, Craig |
| 6 | (Canada) | Fwd | Dawson, Dan |
| 23 | (Canada) | Def | Grimes, Mike |
| 19 | (Canada) | Def | Hinman, Greg |
| 14 | (Iroquois) | Fwd | Lazore, Andrew |

| No. | | Position | Player |
|---|---|---|---|
| 27 | (Canada) | Def | Lough, Peter |
| 28 | (Canada) | Def | MacDonald, Brad |
| 11 | (Canada) | Fwd | Malawsky, Curt |
| 18 | (Canada) | Fwd | Malawsky, Derek |
| 36 | (Canada) | Fwd | McKay, Chris |
| 10 | (Canada) | Def | Murray, Bruce |
| 12 | (Canada) | Fwd | Plunkett, Lindsay |
| 21 | (Canada) | Fwd | Secore, Andy |
| 7 | (Canada) | Def | Self, Scott |
| 24 | (Canada) | Trans | Seller, Chris |
| 20 | (Canada) | Fwd | Tinning, Mark |
| 13 | (Canada) | Fwd | Veltman, Peter |

== See also ==
- 2007 NLL season
