= 2007 Minnesota Swarm season =

American lacrosse season

2007 Minnesota Swarm
- League: NLL
- Division: 3rd East
- 2007 record: 6-10
- Home record: 3-5
- Road record: 3-5
- Goals for: 200
- Goals against: 207
- General Manager: Marty O'Neill
- Coach: Duane Jacobs
- Captain: Ryan Cousins
- Arena: Xcel Energy Center
- Average attendance: 9,733

Team leaders
- Goals: Chris Panos (30)
- Assists: Ryan Ward (52)
- Points: Ryan Ward (75)
- Penalties in minutes: Mike Kilby (56)
- Loose Balls: Ryan Cousins (108)
- Wins: Nick Patterson (8)
- Goals against average: Nick Patterson (11.43)

The Minnesota Swarm are a lacrosse team based in Saint Paul, Minnesota playing in the National Lacrosse League (NLL). The 2007 season was the franchise's 3rd season in the league.

== Regular season ==
=== Conference standings ===
East Division
P	Team	GP	W	L	PCT	GB	Home	Road	GF	GA	Diff	GF/GP	GA/GP
1	Rochester Knighthawks – xyz	16	14	2	.875	0.0	8–0	6–2	249	194	+55	15.56	12.12
2	Buffalo Bandits – x	16	10	6	.625	4.0	6–2	4–4	207	188	+19	12.94	11.75
3	Minnesota Swarm – x	16	9	7	.562	5.0	4–4	5–3	200	207	−7	12.50	12.94
4	Toronto Rock – x	16	6	10	.375	8.0	3–5	3–5	187	183	+4	11.69	11.44
5	Chicago Shamrox	16	6	10	.375	8.0	4–4	2–6	176	191	−15	11.00	11.94
6	Philadelphia Wings	16	6	10	.375	8.0	4–4	2–6	178	186	−8	11.12	11.62
7	New York Titans	16	4	12	.250	10.0	3–5	1–7	195	233	−38	12.19	14.56

West Division
P	Team	GP	W	L	PCT	GB	Home	Road	GF	GA	Diff	GF/GP	GA/GP
1	Colorado Mammoth – xy	16	12	4	.750	0.0	7–1	5–3	209	179	+30	13.06	11.19
2	Calgary Roughnecks – x	16	9	7	.562	3.0	4–4	5–3	219	202	+17	13.69	12.62
3	Arizona Sting – x	16	9	7	.562	3.0	6–2	3–5	188	181	+7	11.75	11.31
4	San Jose Stealth – x	16	9	7	.562	3.0	4–4	5–3	181	170	+11	11.31	10.62
5	Edmonton Rush	16	6	10	.375	6.0	4–4	2–6	160	189	−29	10.00	11.81
6	Portland LumberJax	16	4	12	.250	8.0	3–5	1–7	153	199	−46	9.56	12.44

x: Clinched playoff berth; c: Clinched playoff berth by crossing over to another division; y: Clinched division; z: Clinched best regular season record; GP: Games Played
W: Wins; L: Losses; GB: Games back; PCT: Win percentage; Home: Record at Home; Road: Record on the Road; GF: Goals scored; GA: Goals allowed
Differential: Difference between goals scored and allowed; GF/GP: Average number of goals scored per game; GA/GP: Average number of goals allowed per game

=== Game log ===
Game	Date	Opponent	Location	Score	OT	Attendance	Record
1	January 13, 2007	Chicago Shamrox	Xcel Energy Center	L 10–11		10,544	0–1
2	January 19, 2007	Rochester Knighthawks	Xcel Energy Center	W 11–10		8,174	1–1
3	January 20, 2007	@ Buffalo Bandits	HSBC Arena	L 13–22		12,883	1–2
4	January 27, 2007	@ Calgary Roughnecks	Pengrowth Saddledome	L 14–15		11,462	1–3
5	February 2, 2007	@ Portland LumberJax	Rose Garden	W 11–8		6,281	2–3
6	February 17, 2007	@ New York Titans	Madison Square Garden	W 15–14		7,026	3–3
7	February 18, 2007	New York Titans	Xcel Energy Center	W 17–14		9,056	4–3
8	February 24, 2007	@ Chicago Shamrox	Sears Centre	W 19–11		6,101	5–3
9	March 4, 2007	Buffalo Bandits	Xcel Energy Center	L 15–16		7,504	5–4
10	March 18, 2007	Philadelphia Wings	Xcel Energy Center	W 11–9		7,524	6–4
11	March 23, 2007	Toronto Rock	Xcel Energy Center	L 6–13		8,184	6–5
12	March 31, 2007	Colorado Mammoth	Xcel Energy Center	L 9–11		10,114	6–6
13	April 6, 2007	@ Toronto Rock	Air Canada Centre	W 13–11		15,469	7–6
14	April 7, 2007	@ Rochester Knighthawks	Blue Cross Arena	L 9–19		9,536	7–7
15	April 13, 2007	@ Philadelphia Wings	Wachovia Center	W 11–8		11,738	8–7
16	April 14, 2007	Arizona Sting	Xcel Energy Center	W 16–15		14,144	9–7

== Playoffs ==
=== Game log ===
Game	Date	Opponent	Location	Score	OT	Attendance	Record
Division Semifinal	April 22, 2007	@ Buffalo Bandits	HSBC Arena	L 8–14		9,003	0–1

== Player stats ==
=== Runners (Top 10) ===
Note: GP = Games played; G = Goals; A = Assists; Pts = Points; LB = Loose balls; PIM = Penalty minutes

Player	GP	G	A	Pts	LB	PIM
Ryan Ward	15	23	52	75	44	6
Sean Pollock	15	26	41	67	60	28
Dean Hill	14	32	21	53	29	4
Kasey Beirnes	15	23	20	43	49	8
Spencer Martin	14	14	27	41	56	15
Scott Stewart	15	17	23	40	57	4
Chad Culp	11	13	24	37	29	12
Mike Hominuck	6	12	16	28	25	2
Ryan Cousins	16	9	14	23	108	16
Totals		323	523	336	1053	52

=== Goaltenders ===
Note: GP = Games played; MIN = Minutes; W = Wins; L = Losses; GA = Goals against; Sv% = Save percentage; GAA = Goals against average

Player	GP	MIN	W	L	GA	Sv%	GAA
Nick Patterson	16	656:19	7	5	125	.775	11.43
Matt Disher	16	300:58	2	2	81	.676	16.15
Totals			9	7	207	.743	12.94

== Awards ==
Player	Award
Marty O'Neill	NLL GM of the Year
Ryan Cousins	NLL Defensive Player of the Year
Ryan Cousins	First Team All-Pro
Nick Patterson	Second Team All-Pro
Ryan Cousins	All-Stars
Ryan Ward	All-Stars

== Transactions ==
=== Trades ===
February 7, 2007	To Minnesota Swarm Mike Hominuck	To Portland LumberJax Kelly Hall
February 9, 2007	To Minnesota Swarm Ryan Sharp	To Portland LumberJax 1st round pick, 2007 entry draft 2nd round pick, 2007 entry draft 3rd round pick, 2008 entry draft

== Roster ==
No.		Position	Player
22	(Canada)	Fwd	Beirnes, Kasey
18	(Canada)	Def	Biers, Andrew
10	(Canada)	Def	Boyle, Brock
50	(Canada)	Def	Cousins, Ryan
19	(Canada)	Fwd	Culp, Chad
1	(Canada)	Goalie	Disher, Matt
	(Canada)	Fwd	Hall, Kelly
73	(Canada)	Fwd	Hill, Dean
47	(United States)	Fwd	Hill, Travis
90	(Canada)	Fwd	Hominuck, Mike
77	(Canada)	Def	Kemp, Riley
55	(Canada)	Def	Kilby, Mike
15	(Canada)	Fwd	Martin, Spencer

No.		Position	Player
8	(Canada)	Fwd	McDade, Rory
6	(United States)	Def	McLean, Ashton
	(Canada)	Def	Miyashita, Mark
12	(Canada)	Def	Pacey, Eric
93	(Canada)	Goalie	Patterson, Nick
		Fwd	Perkins, Eric
17	(Canada)	Fwd	Pollock, Sean
20	(Canada)	Def	Ross, Kyle
26	(Canada)	Def	Sharp, Ryan
48	(Canada)	Fwd	Stewart, Scott
23	(Canada)	Def	Sullivan, Jon
16	(Canada)	Fwd	Talbot, Noah
44	(Canada)	Fwd	Ward, Ryan

== See also ==
- 2007 NLL season
