= 2007 Edmonton Rush season =

2007 Edmonton Rush
- League: NLL
- Division: 5th West
- 2007 record: 6-10
- Home record: 4-4
- Road record: 2-6
- Goals for: 160
- Goals against: 189
- General Manager: Paul Day
- Coach: Paul Day
- Captain: Andrew Turner
- Arena: Rexall Place
- Average attendance: 10,815

Team leaders
- Goals: Chris Gill (37)
- Assists: Jason Wulder (35)
- Points: Chris Gill (62)
- Penalties in minutes: Andrew Turner (34)
- Loose Balls: Chris McElroy (84)
- Wins: Curtis Palidwor (5)
- Goals against average: Curtis Palidwor (10.99)

The Edmonton Rush are a lacrosse team based in Edmonton, Alberta playing in the National Lacrosse League (NLL). The 2007 season was the 2nd in franchise history.

The Rush improved on their single-victory inaugural season with a respectable 6-10 record, but still finished well out of the playoffs.

== Regular season ==
=== Conference standings ===
East Division
P	Team	GP	W	L	PCT	GB	Home	Road	GF	GA	Diff	GF/GP	GA/GP
1	Rochester Knighthawks – xyz	16	14	2	.875	0.0	8–0	6–2	249	194	+55	15.56	12.12
2	Buffalo Bandits – x	16	10	6	.625	4.0	6–2	4–4	207	188	+19	12.94	11.75
3	Minnesota Swarm – x	16	9	7	.562	5.0	4–4	5–3	200	207	−7	12.50	12.94
4	Toronto Rock – x	16	6	10	.375	8.0	3–5	3–5	187	183	+4	11.69	11.44
5	Chicago Shamrox	16	6	10	.375	8.0	4–4	2–6	176	191	−15	11.00	11.94
6	Philadelphia Wings	16	6	10	.375	8.0	4–4	2–6	178	186	−8	11.12	11.62
7	New York Titans	16	4	12	.250	10.0	3–5	1–7	195	233	−38	12.19	14.56

West Division
P	Team	GP	W	L	PCT	GB	Home	Road	GF	GA	Diff	GF/GP	GA/GP
1	Colorado Mammoth – xy	16	12	4	.750	0.0	7–1	5–3	209	179	+30	13.06	11.19
2	Calgary Roughnecks – x	16	9	7	.562	3.0	4–4	5–3	219	202	+17	13.69	12.62
3	Arizona Sting – x	16	9	7	.562	3.0	6–2	3–5	188	181	+7	11.75	11.31
4	San Jose Stealth – x	16	9	7	.562	3.0	4–4	5–3	181	170	+11	11.31	10.62
5	Edmonton Rush	16	6	10	.375	6.0	4–4	2–6	160	189	−29	10.00	11.81
6	Portland LumberJax	16	4	12	.250	8.0	3–5	1–7	153	199	−46	9.56	12.44

x: Clinched playoff berth; c: Clinched playoff berth by crossing over to another division; y: Clinched division; z: Clinched best regular season record; GP: Games Played
W: Wins; L: Losses; GB: Games back; PCT: Win percentage; Home: Record at Home; Road: Record on the Road; GF: Goals scored; GA: Goals allowed
Differential: Difference between goals scored and allowed; GF/GP: Average number of goals scored per game; GA/GP: Average number of goals allowed per game

=== Game log ===
Game	Date	Opponent	Location	Score	OT	Attendance	Record
1	January 6, 2007	Philadelphia Wings	Rexall Place	W 13–12		9,417	1–0
2	January 13, 2007	Calgary Roughnecks	Rexall Place	L 12–13		10,702	1–1
3	January 19, 2007	Colorado Mammoth	Rexall Place	L 9–16		11,065	1–2
4	February 3, 2007	@ Colorado Mammoth	Pepsi Center	L 7–16		17,804	1–3
5	February 10, 2007	Arizona Sting	Rexall Place	W 11–9		10,435	2–3
6	February 18, 2007	@ Arizona Sting	Jobing.com Arena	L 11–12	OT	7,063	2–4
7	February 23, 2007	Portland LumberJax	Rexall Place	W 9–8	OT	9,177	3–4
8	March 2, 2007	San Jose Stealth	Rexall Place	L 9–11		9,388	3–5
9	March 16, 2007	Toronto Rock	Rexall Place	W 12–9		11,547	4–5
10	March 25, 2007	@ San Jose Stealth	HP Pavilion at San Jose	L 7–14		3,552	4–6
11	March 31, 2007	@ New York Titans	Madison Square Garden	L 10–11		6,432	4–7
12	April 1, 2007	@ Chicago Shamrox	Sears Centre	W 8–6		4,665	5–7
13	April 6, 2007	@ Calgary Roughnecks	Pengrowth Saddledome	W 13–12		13,715	6–7
14	April 7, 2007	@ San Jose Stealth	HP Pavilion at San Jose	L 8–9		3,845	6–8
15	April 13, 2007	@ Portland LumberJax	Rose Garden	L 10–14		10,037	6–9
16	April 14, 2007	Calgary Roughnecks	Rexall Place	L 11–17		14,790	6–10

== Player stats ==
=== Runners (Top 10) ===
Note: GP = Games played; G = Goals; A = Assists; Pts = Points; LB = Loose Balls; PIM = Penalty minutes

Player	GP	G	A	Pts	LB	PIM
Chris Gill	16	37	25	62	54	10
Jimmy Quinlan	16	23	32	55	74	25
Dan Stroup	16	29	22	51	51	6
Jason Wulder	15	10	35	45	50	28
Jamey Bowen	12	11	33	44	32	2
Randy Daly	12	13	28	41	64	9
Ryan O'Connor	9	7	15	22	25	8
Chris McElroy	16	8	6	14	84	31
AJ Shannon	5	5	6	11	13	4
Totals		270	430	305	1016	44

=== Goaltenders ===
Note: GP = Games played; MIN = Minutes; W = Wins; L = Losses; GA = Goals against; Sv% = Save percentage; GAA = Goals against average

Player	GP	MIN	W	L	GA	Sv%	GAA
Curtis Palidwor	12	709:44	5	7	124	.789	10.48
Pat Campbell	12	221:31	1	3	56	.724	15.17
Kurtis Wagar	8	31:48	0	0	6	.769	11.32
Totals			6	10	189	.770	11.81

== Awards ==
Player	Award
Andrew Turner	All-Stars
Chris Gill	All-Stars
Jimmy Quinlan	All-Stars

== Transactions ==
=== Trades ===
June 28, 2006	To Edmonton Rush A.J. Shannon (F); *1st round pick in 2007 Entry Draft - Mitch Belisle (D)	To Buffalo Bandits 1st round pick in 2006 Entry Draft - Brett Bucktooth (F)
July 13, 2006	To Edmonton Rush Dan Stroup (F); Chris Gill (F); Ryan O'Connor (F)	To Chicago Shamrox Mat Giles (F); Jason Clark (F); 1st round pick in 2006 Entry Draft - Josh Wasson (F)
July 27, 2006	To Edmonton Rush **3rd round pick in 2008 Entry Draft - Mike Leveille (F)	To Arizona Sting Brad Dairon (F)
August 1, 2006	To Edmonton Rush Jason Wulder (F)	To Calgary Roughnecks Kerry Susheski (T); ***2nd round pick in 2007 Entry Draft - Cory Conway (F)
February 9, 2007	To Edmonton Rush Curtis Palidwor (G); Conditional 5th round pick in 2007 Entry Draft	To New York Titans 1st round pick in 2007 Entry Draft - Mitch Belisle (D)

*Later traded to the New York Titans
**Later traded to the Philadelphia Wings
***Later traded back to the Portland LumberJax

=== Entry Draft ===
The 2006 NLL Entry Draft took place on September 13, 2006. The Rush made the following selections:

Round	Overall	Player	College/Club
3	28	Kurtis Wagar (G)	St. Catharines Jr. A
4	46	Cory Melville (T)	Burnaby Jr. A
5	54	Kris Hartzell (D)	St. Andrew's College

== Roster ==
No.		Position	Player
7	(Canada)	Def	Allen, Mac
6	(Canada)	Trans	Bergman, Cam
15	(Canada)	Fwd	Bowen, Jamey
	(Canada)	Goalie	Campbell, Pat
9	(Canada)	Fwd	Daly, Randy
12	(United States)	Def	Finck, Dan
25	(Canada)	Fwd	Gill, Chris
43	(Canada)	Def	Glaves, Rory
21	(Canada)	Trans	Hillier, Darren
18	(Canada)	Fwd	Howard, Kevin
23	(Canada)	Fwd	Jenner, Teddy
44	(Canada)	Trans	McElroy, Chris

No.		Position	Player
19	(Canada)	Trans	Melville, Cory
	(Canada)	Fwd	O'Connor, Ryan
0	(Canada)	Goalie	Palidwor, Curtis
81	(Canada)	Fwd	Quinlan, Jimmy
11	(Canada)	Trans	Roy, Jamie
88	(Canada)	Fwd	Shannon, AJ
29	(Canada)	Def	Stobart, Buck
8	(Canada)	Fwd	Stroup, Dan
26	(Canada)	Def	Turner, Andrew
50	(Canada)	Goalie	Wagar, Kurtis
2	(Canada)	Def	Welsh, Daryl
33	(Canada)	Def	Williams, Rob
22	(Canada)	Fwd	Wulder, Jason

== See also ==
- 2007 NLL season
