= 2007 Philadelphia Wings season =

2007 Philadelphia Wings
- League: NLL
- Division: 6th East
- 2007 record: 6–10
- Home record: 4–4
- Road record: 2–6
- Goals for: 178
- Goals against: 186
- General Manager: Lindsay Sanderson
- Coach: Lindsay Sanderson
- Captain: Thomas Hajek
- Alternate captains: Jake Bergey; Peter Jacobs
- Arena: Wachovia Center
- Average attendance: 11,061

Team leaders
- Goals: Athan Iannucci (30)
- Assists: Dan Marohl (44)
- Points: Sean Greenhalgh (68)
- Penalties in minutes: Geoff Snider (62)
- Loose Balls: Geoff Snider (180)
- Wins: Matt Roik (6)
- Goals against average: Matt Roik (11.12)

The Philadelphia Wings are a lacrosse team based in Philadelphia, Pennsylvania playing in the National Lacrosse League (NLL). The 2007 season was the 21st in franchise history. 2007 saw the Wings finish with a 6–10 record and out of the playoffs for a fifth straight year.

== Regular season ==
=== Conference standings ===
East Division
P	Team	GP	W	L	PCT	GB	Home	Road	GF	GA	Diff	GF/GP	GA/GP
1	Rochester Knighthawks – xyz	16	14	2	.875	0.0	8–0	6–2	249	194	+55	15.56	12.12
2	Buffalo Bandits – x	16	10	6	.625	4.0	6–2	4–4	207	188	+19	12.94	11.75
3	Minnesota Swarm – x	16	9	7	.562	5.0	4–4	5–3	200	207	−7	12.50	12.94
4	Toronto Rock – x	16	6	10	.375	8.0	3–5	3–5	187	183	+4	11.69	11.44
5	Chicago Shamrox	16	6	10	.375	8.0	4–4	2–6	176	191	−15	11.00	11.94
6	Philadelphia Wings	16	6	10	.375	8.0	4–4	2–6	178	186	−8	11.12	11.62
7	New York Titans	16	4	12	.250	10.0	3–5	1–7	195	233	−38	12.19	14.56

West Division
P	Team	GP	W	L	PCT	GB	Home	Road	GF	GA	Diff	GF/GP	GA/GP
1	Colorado Mammoth – xy	16	12	4	.750	0.0	7–1	5–3	209	179	+30	13.06	11.19
2	Calgary Roughnecks – x	16	9	7	.562	3.0	4–4	5–3	219	202	+17	13.69	12.62
3	Arizona Sting – x	16	9	7	.562	3.0	6–2	3–5	188	181	+7	11.75	11.31
4	San Jose Stealth – x	16	9	7	.562	3.0	4–4	5–3	181	170	+11	11.31	10.62
5	Edmonton Rush	16	6	10	.375	6.0	4–4	2–6	160	189	−29	10.00	11.81
6	Portland LumberJax	16	4	12	.250	8.0	3–5	1–7	153	199	−46	9.56	12.44

x: Clinched playoff berth; c: Clinched playoff berth by crossing over to another division; y: Clinched division; z: Clinched best regular season record; GP: Games Played
W: Wins; L: Losses; GB: Games back; PCT: Win percentage; Home: Record at Home; Road: Record on the Road; GF: Goals scored; GA: Goals allowed
Differential: Difference between goals scored and allowed; GF/GP: Average number of goals scored per game; GA/GP: Average number of goals allowed per game

=== Game log ===
Game	Date	Opponent	Location	Score	OT	Attendance	Record
1	January 6, 2007	@ Edmonton Rush	Rexall Place	L 12–13		9,417	0–1
2	January 13, 2007	Portland LumberJax	Wachovia Center	L 12–14		8,268	0–2
3	January 20, 2007	San Jose Stealth	Wachovia Center	W 9–8		9,737	1–2
4	January 26, 2007	@ New York Titans	Madison Square Garden	W 16–11		5,338	2–2
5	January 27, 2007	Toronto Rock	Wachovia Center	W 10–9		11,292	3–2
6	February 10, 2007	@ Calgary Roughnecks	Pengrowth Saddledome	W 10–7		14,175	4–2
7	February 17, 2007	Buffalo Bandits	Wachovia Center	L 8–12		12,688	4–3
8	February 24, 2007	@ Buffalo Bandits	HSBC Arena	L 12–13		14,882	4–4
9	March 3, 2007	Rochester Knighthawks	Wachovia Center	L 13–14		11,491	4–5
10	March 18, 2007	@ Minnesota Swarm	Xcel Energy Center	L 9–11		7,524	4–6
11	March 24, 2007	Chicago Shamrox	Wachovia Center	W 12–11		12,132	5–6
12	March 30, 2007	@ Toronto Rock	Air Canada Centre	L 6–15		16,813	5–7
13	March 31, 2007	@ Rochester Knighthawks	Blue Cross Arena	L 10–12		11,200	5–8
14	April 7, 2007	New York Titans	Wachovia Center	W 20–8		13,201	6–8
15	April 13, 2007	Minnesota Swarm	Wachovia Center	L 8–11		11,738	6–9
16	April 14, 2007	@ Chicago Shamrox	Sears Centre	L 11–17		7,092	6–10

== Player stats ==
=== Runners (Top 10) ===
Note: GP = Games played; G = Goals; A = Assists; Pts = Points; LB = Loose balls; PIM = Penalty minutes

Player	GP	G	A	Pts	LB	PIM
Sean Greenhalgh	16	26	42	68	100	2
Dan Marohl	16	20	44	64	71	2
Athan Iannucci	15	30	24	54	123	16
Jake Bergey	15	22	25	47	60	6
Kyle Wailes	11	16	21	37	41	8
Geoff Snider	15	14	17	31	180	62
Keith Cromwell	10	7	17	24	27	0
Jeff Ratcliffe	14	16	5	21	66	26
Marc Morley	12	11	7	18	46	2
Totals		259	437	329	1166	40

=== Goaltenders ===
Note: GP = Games played; MIN = Minutes; W = Wins; L = Losses; GA = Goals against; Sv% = Save percentage; GAA = Goals against average

Player	GP	MIN	W	L	GA	Sv%	GAA
Matt Roik	14	744:24	6	6	138	.754	11.12
Jay Preece	6	104:01	0	1	24	.721	13.84
Ken Montour	12	102:48	0	3	21	.696	12.26
Totals			6	10	186	.741	11.63

== Awards ==
Player	Award
Athan Iannucci	All-Rookie Team
Geoff Snider	All-Rookie Team
Geoff Snider	Rookie of the Month, January
Thomas Hajek	All-Stars
Geoff Snider	All-Stars
Matt Roik	All-Stars

== Roster ==
No.		Position	Player
66	(United States)	Fwd	Bergey, Jake
82	(United States)	Def	Burke, Zach
1	(United States)	Trans	Christmas, John
21	(United States)	Fwd	Cromwell, Keith
22	(United States)	Def	Davis, Damien
45	(United States)	Fwd	Fiat, Kyle
19	(Canada)	Fwd	Greenhalgh, Sean
28	(United States)	Def	Hajek, Thomas
32	(Canada)	Fwd	Iannucci, Athan
24	(United States)	Def	Jacobs, Peter
2	(Canada)	Fwd	Llord, Ian

No.		Position	Player
27	(United States)	Fwd	Marohl, Dan
29	(Haudenosaunee)	Goalie	Montour, Ken
17	(United States)	Fwd	Morley, Marc
34	(United States)	Def	Nadelen, Shawn
30	(Canada)	Goalie	Preece, Jay
90	(United States)	Fwd	Ratcliffe, Jeff
37	(Canada)	Goalie	Roik, Matt
9	(United States)	Def	Rosenburger, Ian
4	(Canada)	Trans	Snider, Geoff
7	(United States)	Def	Sweeney, Kyle
77	(Canada)	Fwd	Van Beek, Rob
88	(Canada)	Fwd	Wailes, Kyle

== See also ==
- 2007 NLL season
