= 2007 Toronto Rock season =

Canadian lacrosse team

2007 Toronto Rock
- League: NLL
- Division: 4th East
- 2007 record: 6–10
- Home record: 3–5
- Road record: 3–5
- Goals for: 187
- Goals against: 183
- General Manager: Mike Kloepfer
- Coach: Glenn Clark
- Captain: Jim Veltman
- Alternate captains: Blaine Manning; Chris Driscoll
- Arena: Air Canada Centre
- Average attendance: 15,851

Team leaders
- Goals: Aaron Wilson (37)
- Assists: Blaine Manning (56)
- Points: Josh Sanderson (85)
- Penalties in minutes: Patrick Merrill (53)
- Loose Balls: Jim Veltman (143)
- Wins: Bob Watson (6)
- Goals against average: Bob Watson (11.01)

The Toronto Rock are a lacrosse team based in Toronto, Ontario playing in the National Lacrosse League (NLL). The 2007 season was the franchise's 11th season, and its 10th season as the Toronto Rock.

After firing head coach and GM Terry Sanderson following the 2006 season, the Rock hired Glenn Clark, who played for eight seasons with the franchise, as their new head coach. Clark led the Rock to their worst record ever, and first season under .500. However, both the Philadelphia Wings and Chicago Shamrox finishing with the same 6–10 record, and the Rock sneaked into the playoffs by virtue of tiebreakers. The celebration was short-lived, however, as the Rock scored only 6 goals losing their playoff game against the eventual champion Rochester Knighthawks.

2007 marked the first Rock season without All-Star forward Colin Doyle, who was traded with Darren Halls to San Jose in the off-season for former first-overall draft pick Ryan Benesch, Kevin Fines, and Chad Thompson. Benesch was named Rookie of the Year.

== Regular season ==
=== Conference standings ===
East Division
| P | Team | GP | W | L | PCT | GB | Home | Road | GF | GA | Diff | GF/GP | GA/GP |
|---|---|---|---|---|---|---|---|---|---|---|---|---|---|
| 1 | Rochester Knighthawks – xyz | 16 | 14 | 2 | .875 | 0.0 | 8–0 | 6–2 | 249 | 194 | +55 | 15.56 | 12.12 |
| 2 | Buffalo Bandits – x | 16 | 10 | 6 | .625 | 4.0 | 6–2 | 4–4 | 207 | 188 | +19 | 12.94 | 11.75 |
| 3 | Minnesota Swarm – x | 16 | 9 | 7 | .562 | 5.0 | 4–4 | 5–3 | 200 | 207 | −7 | 12.50 | 12.94 |
| 4 | Toronto Rock – x | 16 | 6 | 10 | .375 | 8.0 | 3–5 | 3–5 | 187 | 183 | +4 | 11.69 | 11.44 |
| 5 | Chicago Shamrox | 16 | 6 | 10 | .375 | 8.0 | 4–4 | 2–6 | 176 | 191 | −15 | 11.00 | 11.94 |
| 6 | Philadelphia Wings | 16 | 6 | 10 | .375 | 8.0 | 4–4 | 2–6 | 178 | 186 | −8 | 11.12 | 11.62 |
| 7 | New York Titans | 16 | 4 | 12 | .250 | 10.0 | 3–5 | 1–7 | 195 | 233 | −38 | 12.19 | 14.56 |

West Division
| P | Team | GP | W | L | PCT | GB | Home | Road | GF | GA | Diff | GF/GP | GA/GP |
|---|---|---|---|---|---|---|---|---|---|---|---|---|---|
| 1 | Colorado Mammoth – xy | 16 | 12 | 4 | .750 | 0.0 | 7–1 | 5–3 | 209 | 179 | +30 | 13.06 | 11.19 |
| 2 | Calgary Roughnecks – x | 16 | 9 | 7 | .562 | 3.0 | 4–4 | 5–3 | 219 | 202 | +17 | 13.69 | 12.62 |
| 3 | Arizona Sting – x | 16 | 9 | 7 | .562 | 3.0 | 6–2 | 3–5 | 188 | 181 | +7 | 11.75 | 11.31 |
| 4 | San Jose Stealth – x | 16 | 9 | 7 | .562 | 3.0 | 4–4 | 5–3 | 181 | 170 | +11 | 11.31 | 10.62 |
| 5 | Edmonton Rush | 16 | 6 | 10 | .375 | 6.0 | 4–4 | 2–6 | 160 | 189 | −29 | 10.00 | 11.81 |
| 6 | Portland LumberJax | 16 | 4 | 12 | .250 | 8.0 | 3–5 | 1–7 | 153 | 199 | −46 | 9.56 | 12.44 |

x: Clinched playoff berth; c: Clinched playoff berth by crossing over to another division; y: Clinched division; z: Clinched best regular season record; GP: Games Played
W: Wins; L: Losses; GB: Games back; PCT: Win percentage; Home: Record at Home; Road: Record on the Road; GF: Goals scored; GA: Goals allowed
Differential: Difference between goals scored and allowed; GF/GP: Average number of goals scored per game; GA/GP: Average number of goals allowed per game

=== Game log ===
| Game | Date | Opponent | Location | Score | OT | Attendance | Record |
|---|---|---|---|---|---|---|---|
| 1 | January 13, 2007 | @ Rochester Knighthawks | Blue Cross Arena | L 6–10 | | 10,321 | 0–1 |
| 2 | January 20, 2007 | Rochester Knighthawks | Air Canada Centre | L 15–19 | | 16,882 | 0–2 |
| 3 | January 27, 2007 | @ Philadelphia Wings | Wachovia Center | L 9–10 | | 11,292 | 0–3 |
| 4 | February 2, 2007 | @ Buffalo Bandits | HSBC Arena | W 14–10 | | 13,659 | 1–3 |
| 5 | February 3, 2007 | Buffalo Bandits | Air Canada Centre | W 13–8 | | 15,471 | 2–3 |
| 6 | February 18, 2007 | Chicago Shamrox | Air Canada Centre | W 11–10 | | 15,200 | 3–3 |
| 7 | February 23, 2007 | @ Calgary Roughnecks | Pengrowth Saddledome | W 12–9 | | 13,672 | 4–3 |
| 8 | February 24, 2007 | Calgary Roughnecks | Air Canada Centre | L 13–17 | | 15,312 | 4–4 |
| 9 | March 3, 2007 | @ New York Titans | Madison Square Garden | L 10–13 | | 7,434 | 4–5 |
| 10 | March 16, 2007 | @ Edmonton Rush | Rexall Place | L 9–12 | | 11,547 | 4–6 |
| 11 | March 17, 2007 | Colorado Mammoth | Air Canada Centre | L 12–13 | OT | 15,614 | 4–7 |
| 12 | March 23, 2007 | @ Minnesota Swarm | Xcel Energy Center | W 13–6 | | 8,184 | 5–7 |
| 13 | March 30, 2007 | Philadelphia Wings | Air Canada Centre | W 15–6 | | 16,813 | 6–7 |
| 14 | April 6, 2007 | Minnesota Swarm | Air Canada Centre | L 11–13 | | 15,469 | 6–8 |
| 15 | April 7, 2007 | @ Chicago Shamrox | Sears Centre | L 13–15 | | 5,007 | 6–9 |
| 16 | April 14, 2007 | New York Titans | Air Canada Centre | L 11–12 | | 16,054 | 6–10 |

== Playoffs ==
=== Game log ===
| Game | Date | Opponent | Location | Score | OT | Attendance | Record |
|---|---|---|---|---|---|---|---|
| Division Semifinal | April 20, 2007 | @ Rochester Knighthawks | Blue Cross Arena | L 6–10 | | 7,003 | 0–1 |

== Player stats ==
=== Runners (Top 10) ===
Note: GP = Games played; G = Goals; A = Assists; Pts = Points; LB = Loose balls; PIM = Penalty minutes

| Player | GP | G | A | Pts | LB | PIM |
|---|---|---|---|---|---|---|
| Josh Sanderson | 16 | 31 | 54 | 85 | 78 | 10 |
| Blaine Manning | 16 | 21 | 56 | 77 | 56 | 2 |
| Aaron Wilson | 16 | 37 | 34 | 71 | 110 | 17 |
| Ryan Benesch | 15 | 33 | 25 | 58 | 64 | 6 |
| Jim Veltman | 13 | 3 | 34 | 37 | 143 | 10 |
| Chris Driscoll | 16 | 12 | 16 | 28 | 91 | 14 |
| Chad Thompson | 16 | 14 | 10 | 24 | 56 | 11 |
| Kevin Fines | 13 | 15 | 7 | 22 | 30 | 21 |
| Matt Shearer | 9 | 9 | 10 | 19 | 19 | 4 |
| Totals | | 290 | 477 | 285 | 1130 | 55 |

=== Goaltenders ===
Note: GP = Games played; MIN = Minutes; W = Wins; L = Losses; GA = Goals against; Sv% = Save percentage; GAA = Goals against average

| Player | GP | MIN | W | L | GA | Sv% | GAA |
|---|---|---|---|---|---|---|---|
| Bob Watson | 16 | 855:37 | 6 | 8 | 157 | .789 | 11.01 |
| Mike Poulin | 16 | 96:11 | 0 | 2 | 18 | .757 | 11.23 |
| Totals | | | 6 | 10 | 183 | .778 | 11.44 |

== Awards ==
| Player | Award |
|---|---|
| Ryan Benesch | NLL Rookie of the Year |
| Ryan Benesch | Rookie of the Month, March |
| Ryan Benesch | All-Rookie Team |
| Aaron Wilson | All-Stars |
| Josh Sanderson | All-Stars |

== Transactions ==
=== Trades ===
| March 16, 2007 | To Toronto Rock first round pick, 2007 entry draft | To Buffalo Bandits Phil Sanderson |
| March 20, 2007 | To Toronto Rock conditional fourth or fifth round pick, 2008 entry draft | To Chicago Shamrox Rusty Kruger |

== Roster ==
| No. | | Position | Player |
|---|---|---|---|
| 21 | (Canada) | Fwd | Benesch, Ryan |
| 37 | (Canada) | Def | Campbell, Scott |
| 23 | (Canada) | Def | Carroll, Matt |
| 93 | (Canada) | Trans | Driscoll, Chris |
| 17 | (Canada) | Def | Fines, Kevin |
| | (Canada) | Fwd | Kimpinski, Sean |
| | (Canada) | Fwd | Kruger, Rusty |
| 6 | (Canada) | Def | Ladouceur, Dan |
| 41 | (Canada) | Def | MacArthur, Brad |
| | (Canada) | ? | MacLeod, Mike |
| 16 | (Canada) | Fwd | Manning, Blaine |
| 14 | (Canada) | Def | Marshall, Rob |
| 9 | (Canada) | Def | Merrill, Patrick |

| No. | | Position | Player |
|---|---|---|---|
| 77 | (Canada) | Fwd | O'Brien, Tim |
| 30 | (Canada) | Goalie | Poulin, Mike |
| 45 | | Def | Riddell, Bryan |
| 40 | (Canada) | Def | Rubel, Ian |
| 19 | (Canada) | Fwd | Sanderson, Josh |
| | (Canada) | Def | Sanderson, Phil |
| 24 | (Canada) | Fwd | Shearer, Matt |
| 27 | (Canada) | Def | Suddons, Derek |
| | (Canada) | Fwd | Taylor, Jamie |
| 12 | (Canada) | Def | Thompson, Chad |
| 32 | (Canada) | Trans | Veltman, Jim |
| 29 | (Canada) | Goalie | Watson, Bob |
| 10 | (Canada) | Fwd | Wilson, Aaron |

== See also ==
- 2007 NLL season
