= 2007 Portland LumberJax season =

2007 Portland LumberJax
- League: NLL
- Division: 6th West
- 2007 record: 4-12
- Home record: 3-5
- Road record: 1-7
- Goals for: 153
- Goals against: 199
- General Manager: Derek Keenan
- Coach: Derek Keenan
- Captain: Pat Jones
- Arena: Rose Garden Arena
- Average attendance: 8,870

Team leaders
- Goals: Ryan Powell (23)
- Assists: Ryan Powell (31)
- Points: Ryan Powell (54)
- Penalties in minutes: Ryder Bateman (50)
- Loose Balls: Brodie Merrill (196)
- Wins: Dallas Eliuk (3)
- Goals against average: Dallas Eliuk (12.19)

The Portland LumberJax are a lacrosse team based in Portland, Oregon playing in the National Lacrosse League (NLL). The 2007 season was the 2nd in franchise history.

After winning the western division in their inaugural season, the LumberJax suffered through a sophomore slump in 2007. After beginning the season with two straight wins, Portland lost the next ten straight, and scored 10 or more goals in only two of those ten games. They finished the season last in the west with a 4–12 record.

== Regular season ==
=== Conference standings ===
East Division
| P | Team | GP | W | L | PCT | GB | Home | Road | GF | GA | Diff | GF/GP | GA/GP |
|---|---|---|---|---|---|---|---|---|---|---|---|---|---|
| 1 | Rochester Knighthawks – xyz | 16 | 14 | 2 | .875 | 0.0 | 8–0 | 6–2 | 249 | 194 | +55 | 15.56 | 12.12 |
| 2 | Buffalo Bandits – x | 16 | 10 | 6 | .625 | 4.0 | 6–2 | 4–4 | 207 | 188 | +19 | 12.94 | 11.75 |
| 3 | Minnesota Swarm – x | 16 | 9 | 7 | .562 | 5.0 | 4–4 | 5–3 | 200 | 207 | −7 | 12.50 | 12.94 |
| 4 | Toronto Rock – x | 16 | 6 | 10 | .375 | 8.0 | 3–5 | 3–5 | 187 | 183 | +4 | 11.69 | 11.44 |
| 5 | Chicago Shamrox | 16 | 6 | 10 | .375 | 8.0 | 4–4 | 2–6 | 176 | 191 | −15 | 11.00 | 11.94 |
| 6 | Philadelphia Wings | 16 | 6 | 10 | .375 | 8.0 | 4–4 | 2–6 | 178 | 186 | −8 | 11.12 | 11.62 |
| 7 | New York Titans | 16 | 4 | 12 | .250 | 10.0 | 3–5 | 1–7 | 195 | 233 | −38 | 12.19 | 14.56 |

West Division
| P | Team | GP | W | L | PCT | GB | Home | Road | GF | GA | Diff | GF/GP | GA/GP |
|---|---|---|---|---|---|---|---|---|---|---|---|---|---|
| 1 | Colorado Mammoth – xy | 16 | 12 | 4 | .750 | 0.0 | 7–1 | 5–3 | 209 | 179 | +30 | 13.06 | 11.19 |
| 2 | Calgary Roughnecks – x | 16 | 9 | 7 | .562 | 3.0 | 4–4 | 5–3 | 219 | 202 | +17 | 13.69 | 12.62 |
| 3 | Arizona Sting – x | 16 | 9 | 7 | .562 | 3.0 | 6–2 | 3–5 | 188 | 181 | +7 | 11.75 | 11.31 |
| 4 | San Jose Stealth – x | 16 | 9 | 7 | .562 | 3.0 | 4–4 | 5–3 | 181 | 170 | +11 | 11.31 | 10.62 |
| 5 | Edmonton Rush | 16 | 6 | 10 | .375 | 6.0 | 4–4 | 2–6 | 160 | 189 | −29 | 10.00 | 11.81 |
| 6 | Portland LumberJax | 16 | 4 | 12 | .250 | 8.0 | 3–5 | 1–7 | 153 | 199 | −46 | 9.56 | 12.44 |

x: Clinched playoff berth; c: Clinched playoff berth by crossing over to another division; y: Clinched division; z: Clinched best regular season record; GP: Games Played
W: Wins; L: Losses; GB: Games back; PCT: Win percentage; Home: Record at Home; Road: Record on the Road; GF: Goals scored; GA: Goals allowed
Differential: Difference between goals scored and allowed; GF/GP: Average number of goals scored per game; GA/GP: Average number of goals allowed per game

=== Game log ===
| Game | Date | Opponent | Location | Score | OT | Attendance | Record |
|---|---|---|---|---|---|---|---|
| 1 | December 30, 2007 | Buffalo Bandits | Rose Garden | W 11–10 | OT | 8,437 | 1–0 |
| 2 | January 13, 2007 | @ Philadelphia Wings | Wachovia Center | W 14–12 | | 8,268 | 2–0 |
| 3 | January 19, 2007 | @ Arizona Sting | Jobing.com Arena | L 4–11 | | 5,729 | 2–1 |
| 4 | January 20, 2007 | Arizona Sting | Rose Garden | L 9–12 | | 9,238 | 2–2 |
| 5 | January 25, 2007 | @ Colorado Mammoth | Pepsi Center | L 11–15 | | 14,388 | 2–3 |
| 6 | February 2, 2007 | Minnesota Swarm | Rose Garden | L 8–11 | | 6,281 | 2–4 |
| 7 | February 15, 2007 | Colorado Mammoth | Rose Garden | L 8–10 | | 7,192 | 2–5 |
| 8 | February 17, 2007 | @ Rochester Knighthawks | Blue Cross Arena | L 12–18 | | 9,774 | 2–6 |
| 9 | February 23, 2007 | @ Edmonton Rush | Rexall Place | L 8–9 | OT | 9,177 | 2–7 |
| 10 | February 24, 2007 | @ Colorado Mammoth | Pepsi Center | L 7–13 | | 18,024 | 2–8 |
| 11 | March 17, 2007 | @ San Jose Stealth | HP Pavilion at San Jose | L 8–17 | | 4,435 | 2–9 |
| 12 | March 24, 2007 | San Jose Stealth | Rose Garden | L 7–9 | | 6,322 | 2–10 |
| 13 | March 30, 2007 | Calgary Roughnecks | Rose Garden | W 13–12 | | 5,963 | 3–10 |
| 14 | March 31, 2007 | @ Calgary Roughnecks | Pengrowth Saddledome | L 11–21 | | 11,915 | 3–11 |
| 15 | April 6, 2007 | San Jose Stealth | Rose Garden | L 8–9 | | 6,748 | 3–12 |
| 16 | April 13, 2007 | Edmonton Rush | Rose Garden | W 14–10 | | 10,037 | 4–12 |

== Player stats ==
=== Runners (Top 10) ===
Note: GP = Games played; G = Goals; A = Assists; Pts = Points; LB = Loose balls; PIM = Penalty minutes

| Player | GP | G | A | Pts | LB | PIM |
|---|---|---|---|---|---|---|
| Ryan Powell | 14 | 23 | 31 | 54 | 65 | 8 |
| Peter Morgan | 15 | 17 | 25 | 42 | 43 | 11 |
| Tyler Heavenor | 10 | 12 | 21 | 33 | 28 | 10 |
| Kelly Hall | 8 | 13 | 11 | 24 | 39 | 25 |
| Ryder Bateman | 15 | 9 | 15 | 24 | 43 | 50 |
| Mike Hominuck | 6 | 6 | 18 | 24 | 39 | 0 |
| Del Halladay | 13 | 8 | 15 | 23 | 44 | 6 |
| Brodie Merrill | 15 | 4 | 19 | 23 | 196 | 49 |
| Scott Stapleford | 15 | 15 | 7 | 22 | 39 | 16 |
| Totals | | 247 | 400 | 385 | 1005 | 51 |

=== Goaltenders ===
Note: GP = Games played; MIN = Minutes; W = Wins; L = Losses; GA = Goals against; Sv% = Save percentage; GAA = Goals against average

| Player | GP | MIN | W | L | GA | Sv% | GAA |
|---|---|---|---|---|---|---|---|
| Dallas Eliuk | 16 | 718:27 | 3 | 9 | 146 | .756 | 12.19 |
| Matt King | 14 | 193:21 | 1 | 2 | 44 | .722 | 13.65 |
| Dwight Maetche | 2 | 53:45 | 0 | 1 | 8 | .818 | 8.93 |
| Totals | | | 4 | 12 | 199 | .752 | 12.44 |

== Awards ==
| Player | Award |
|---|---|
| Brodie Merrill | All-Stars |
| Ryan Powell | All-Stars |
| Pat Jones | All-Stars |
| Richard Morgan | All-Stars |
| Bruce Alexander | All-Stars |

== Transactions ==
=== Trades ===
| February 7, 2007 | To Portland LumberJax Kelly Hall | To Minnesota Swarm Mike Hominuck |
| February 9, 2007 | To Portland LumberJax 1st-round pick, 2007 entry draft 2nd-round pick, 2007 entry draft 3rd-round pick, 2008 entry draft | To Minnesota Swarm Ryan Sharp |

== Roster ==
| No. | | Position | Player |
|---|---|---|---|
| 49 | (Canada) | Def | Alexander, Bruce |
| 14 | (Canada) | Fwd | Bateman, Ryder |
| 20 | (Canada) | Trans | Bysouth, Adam |
| 5 | (Canada) | Def | Crashley, Ian |
| 36 | (United States) | Def | Driscoll, DJ |
| 35 | (Canada) | Goalie | Eliuk, Dallas |
| 2 | (Canada) | Def | Guze, Ray |
| 9 | (Canada) | Fwd | Hall, Kelly |
| 3 | (United States) | Fwd | Halladay, Del |
| 37 | (United States) | Fwd | Heavenor, Tyler |
| 11 | (United States) | Fwd | Holman, Matt |
| | (Canada) | Fwd | Hominuck, Mike |
| 12 | (Canada) | Def | Jones, Pat |

| No. | | Position | Player |
|---|---|---|---|
| 30 | (Canada) | Goalie | King, Matt |
| | (United States) | Goalie | Maetche, Dwight |
| 8 | (United States) | Trans | Marshall, Ryan |
| 24 | (Canada) | Def | Mazuran, Scott |
| 17 | (United States) | Trans | Merrill, Brodie |
| 44 | (Canada) | Fwd | Morgan, Peter |
| 33 | (United States) | Def | Morgan, Richard |
| 7 | (Canada) | Trans | Palmer, Graham |
| 22 | (United States) | Fwd | Powell, Ryan |
| 1 | (United States) | Fwd | Prossner, Jed |
| 32 | (Canada) | Def | Reisig, Darren |
| | (Canada) | Def | Sharp, Ryan |
| 10 | (Canada) | Trans | Stapleford, Scott |

== See also ==
- 2007 NLL season
