= 2007 Colorado Mammoth season =

2007 Colorado Mammoth
- West Division Champions
- League: NLL
- Division: 1st West
- 2007 record: 12-4
- Home record: 7-1
- Road record: 5-3
- Goals for: 209
- Goals against: 179
- General Manager: Steve Govett
- Coach: Gary Gait
- Captain: Gavin Prout
- Alternate captains: Pat Coyle; John Gallant
- Arena: Pepsi Center
- Average attendance: 16,741

Team leaders
- Goals: Dan Carey (32)
- Assists: Gavin Prout (59)
- Points: Gavin Prout (89)
- Penalties in minutes: Jim Moss (36)
- Loose Balls: Josh Sims (136)
- Wins: Gee Nash (9)
- Goals against average: Chris Levis (10.50)

The Colorado Mammoth are a lacrosse team based in Denver, Colorado playing in the National Lacrosse League (NLL). The 2007 season was the 21st in franchise history and 5th as the Mammoth (previously the Washington Power, Pittsburgh Crossefire, and Baltimore Thunder).

The Mammoth won the Western division title with a 12-4 record, but were eliminated in the first round by the 4th place San Jose Stealth. The 2007 season marked Gary Gait's last as Mammoth head coach; he resigned following the season to become head coach of the Syracuse University women's lacrosse team.

== Regular season ==
=== Conference standings ===
East Division
| P | Team | GP | W | L | PCT | GB | Home | Road | GF | GA | Diff | GF/GP | GA/GP |
|---|---|---|---|---|---|---|---|---|---|---|---|---|---|
| 1 | Rochester Knighthawks – xyz | 16 | 14 | 2 | .875 | 0.0 | 8–0 | 6–2 | 249 | 194 | +55 | 15.56 | 12.12 |
| 2 | Buffalo Bandits – x | 16 | 10 | 6 | .625 | 4.0 | 6–2 | 4–4 | 207 | 188 | +19 | 12.94 | 11.75 |
| 3 | Minnesota Swarm – x | 16 | 9 | 7 | .562 | 5.0 | 4–4 | 5–3 | 200 | 207 | −7 | 12.50 | 12.94 |
| 4 | Toronto Rock – x | 16 | 6 | 10 | .375 | 8.0 | 3–5 | 3–5 | 187 | 183 | +4 | 11.69 | 11.44 |
| 5 | Chicago Shamrox | 16 | 6 | 10 | .375 | 8.0 | 4–4 | 2–6 | 176 | 191 | −15 | 11.00 | 11.94 |
| 6 | Philadelphia Wings | 16 | 6 | 10 | .375 | 8.0 | 4–4 | 2–6 | 178 | 186 | −8 | 11.12 | 11.62 |
| 7 | New York Titans | 16 | 4 | 12 | .250 | 10.0 | 3–5 | 1–7 | 195 | 233 | −38 | 12.19 | 14.56 |

West Division
| P | Team | GP | W | L | PCT | GB | Home | Road | GF | GA | Diff | GF/GP | GA/GP |
|---|---|---|---|---|---|---|---|---|---|---|---|---|---|
| 1 | Colorado Mammoth – xy | 16 | 12 | 4 | .750 | 0.0 | 7–1 | 5–3 | 209 | 179 | +30 | 13.06 | 11.19 |
| 2 | Calgary Roughnecks – x | 16 | 9 | 7 | .562 | 3.0 | 4–4 | 5–3 | 219 | 202 | +17 | 13.69 | 12.62 |
| 3 | Arizona Sting – x | 16 | 9 | 7 | .562 | 3.0 | 6–2 | 3–5 | 188 | 181 | +7 | 11.75 | 11.31 |
| 4 | San Jose Stealth – x | 16 | 9 | 7 | .562 | 3.0 | 4–4 | 5–3 | 181 | 170 | +11 | 11.31 | 10.62 |
| 5 | Edmonton Rush | 16 | 6 | 10 | .375 | 6.0 | 4–4 | 2–6 | 160 | 189 | −29 | 10.00 | 11.81 |
| 6 | Portland LumberJax | 16 | 4 | 12 | .250 | 8.0 | 3–5 | 1–7 | 153 | 199 | −46 | 9.56 | 12.44 |

x: Clinched playoff berth; c: Clinched playoff berth by crossing over to another division; y: Clinched division; z: Clinched best regular season record; GP: Games Played
W: Wins; L: Losses; GB: Games back; PCT: Win percentage; Home: Record at Home; Road: Record on the Road; GF: Goals scored; GA: Goals allowed
Differential: Difference between goals scored and allowed; GF/GP: Average number of goals scored per game; GA/GP: Average number of goals allowed per game

=== Game log ===
| Game | Date | Opponent | Location | Score | OT | Attendance | Record |
|---|---|---|---|---|---|---|---|
| 1 | December 30, 2006 | Rochester Knighthawks | Pepsi Center | W 20–15 | | 15,670 | 1–0 |
| 2 | January 5, 2007 | @ Arizona Sting | Jobing.com Arena | W 10–6 | | 7,179 | 2–0 |
| 3 | January 13, 2007 | Buffalo Bandits | Pepsi Center | W 11–10 | OT | 16,523 | 3–0 |
| 4 | January 19, 2007 | @ Edmonton Rush | Rexall Place | W 16–9 | | 11,065 | 4–0 |
| 5 | January 20, 2007 | @ Calgary Roughnecks | Pengrowth Saddledome | L 13–17 | | 11,582 | 4–1 |
| 6 | January 25, 2007 | Portland LumberJax | Pepsi Center | W 15–11 | | 14,388 | 5–1 |
| 7 | February 3, 2007 | Edmonton Rush | Pepsi Center | W 16–7 | | 17,804 | 6–1 |
| 8 | February 15, 2007 | @ Portland LumberJax | Rose Garden | W 10–8 | | 7,192 | 7–1 |
| 9 | February 18, 2007 | Calgary Roughnecks | Pepsi Center | W 15–12 | | 17,911 | 8–1 |
| 10 | February 24, 2007 | Portland LumberJax | Pepsi Center | W 13–7 | | 18,024 | 9–1 |
| 11 | March 17, 2007 | @ Toronto Rock | Air Canada Centre | W 13–12 | OT | 15,614 | 10–1 |
| 12 | March 24, 2007 | @ Buffalo Bandits | HSBC Arena | L 15–19 | | 15,156 | 10–2 |
| 13 | March 30, 2007 | Arizona Sting | Pepsi Center | L 8–14 | | 18,027 | 10–3 |
| 14 | March 31, 2007 | @ Minnesota Swarm | Xcel Energy Center | W 11–9 | | 10,114 | 11–3 |
| 15 | April 12, 2007 | San Jose Stealth | Pepsi Center | W 13–12 | | 16,012 | 12–3 |
| 16 | April 13, 2007 | @ San Jose Stealth | HP Pavilion at San Jose | L 10–11 | | 3,288 | 12–4 |

== Playoffs ==
=== Game log ===
| Game | Date | Opponent | Location | Score | OT | Attendance | Record |
|---|---|---|---|---|---|---|---|
| Division Semifinal | April 21, 2007 | San Jose Stealth | Pepsi Center | L 14–15 | OT | 16,309 | 0–1 |

== Player stats ==
=== Runners (Top 10) ===
Note: GP = Games played; G = Goals; A = Assists; Pts = Points; LB = Loose Balls; PIM = Penalty minutes

| Player | GP | G | A | Pts | LB | PIM |
|---|---|---|---|---|---|---|
| Gavin Prout | 16 | 30 | 59 | 89 | 85 | 32 |
| Dan Carey | 16 | 32 | 44 | 76 | 75 | 9 |
| Brian Langtry | 16 | 31 | 36 | 67 | 77 | 24 |
| Jamie Shewchuk | 15 | 27 | 26 | 53 | 69 | 19 |
| Josh Sims | 15 | 19 | 20 | 39 | 136 | 12 |
| Nenad Gajic | 16 | 13 | 24 | 37 | 102 | 14 |
| Ben Prepchuk | 13 | 15 | 16 | 31 | 36 | 4 |
| Mike Law | 14 | 13 | 12 | 25 | 58 | 0 |
| Jordan Cornfield | 9 | 9 | 3 | 12 | 21 | 6 |
| Totals | | 306 | 515 | 339 | 1094 | 58 |

=== Goaltenders ===
Note: GP = Games played; MIN = Minutes; W = Wins; L = Losses; GA = Goals against; Sv% = Save percentage; GAA = Goals against average

| Player | GP | MIN | W | L | GA | Sv% | GAA |
|---|---|---|---|---|---|---|---|
| Gee Nash | 16 | 681:29 | 9 | 0 | 128 | .779 | 11.27 |
| Chris Levis | 16 | 285:50 | 3 | 4 | 50 | .780 | 10.50 |
| Totals | | | 12 | 4 | 179 | .778 | 11.19 |

== Awards ==
| Player | Award |
|---|---|
| Gavin Prout | Second Team All-Pro |
| Nenad Gajic | All-Rookie Team |
| Jamie Shewchuk | All-Rookie Team |
| Gord Nash | Overall Player of the Month, February |
| Nenad Gajic | Rookie of the Month, February |
| Dan Carey | All-Stars |
| Gavin Prout | All-Stars |
| John Gallant | All-Stars |
| Josh Sims | All-Stars |
| Gord Nash | All-Stars |

== Transactions ==
=== Trades ===
| February 7, 2007 | To Colorado Mammoth Jim Moss | To San Jose Stealth Andrew Burkholder first round pick, 2007 entry draft |

== Roster ==
| No. | | Position | Player |
|---|---|---|---|
| 47 | (United States) | Trans | Bloom, Jason |
| | (Canada) | Fwd | Burkholder, Andrew |
| 44 | (United States) | Fwd | Carey, Dan |
| 8 | (Canada) | Trans | Carlson, Nick |
| 48 | (Canada) | Def | Catton, Rich |
| 72 | (Canada) | Fwd | Cornfield, Jordan |
| 2 | (United States) | Def | Coyle, Pat |
| 13 | (United States) | Trans | Davidson, Scott |
| 28 | (United States) | Def | Ethington, Tom |
| 18 | (Canada) | Trans | Gajic, Nenad |
| 11 | (Canada) | Def | Gallant, John |
| 5 | (United States) | Def | Hanford, Jamie |

| No. | | Position | Player |
|---|---|---|---|
| 6 | (United States) | Fwd | Langtry, Brian |
| 3 | (United States) | Fwd | Law, Mike |
| 66 | (Canada) | Def | Leveque, Matt |
| 30 | (Canada) | Goalie | Levis, Chris |
| 55 | (Canada) | Trans | Moss, Jim |
| 38 | (Canada) | Goalie | Nash, Gee |
| 19 | (United States) | Fwd | Prepchuk, Ben |
| 9 | (Canada) | Fwd | Prout, Gavin |
| 85 | (Canada) | Fwd | Shewchuk, Jamie |
| 4 | (United States) | Trans | Sims, Josh |
| 77 | (United States) | Def | Stilley, Dave |
| 94 | (United States) | Fwd | Taylor, Matt |

== See also ==
- 2007 NLL season
