= 2007 Calgary Roughnecks season =

2007 Calgary Roughnecks
- League: NLL
- Division: 2nd West
- 2007 record: 9-7
- Home record: 4-4
- Road record: 5-3
- Goals for: 219
- Goals against: 202
- General Manager: Kurt Silcott
- Coach: Chris Hall; Jeff Dowling
- Captain: Tracey Kelusky
- Arena: Pengrowth Saddledome
- Average attendance: 11,540

Team leaders
- Goals: Lewis Ratcliff (50)
- Assists: Lewis Ratcliff (54)
- Points: Lewis Ratcliff (104)
- Penalties in minutes: Kerry Susheski (48)
- Loose Balls: Taylor Wray (119)
- Wins: Andrew Leyshon (5)
- Goals against average: Ryan Avery (10.64)

The Calgary Roughnecks are a lacrosse team based in Calgary, Alberta playing in the National Lacrosse League (NLL). The 2007 season was the 6th in franchise history. The Roughnecks finished 2nd in the western division with a 9-7 record but were eliminated in the first round of the playoffs by the Arizona Sting.

== Regular season ==
=== Conference standings ===
East Division
P	Team	GP	W	L	PCT	GB	Home	Road	GF	GA	Diff	GF/GP	GA/GP
1	Rochester Knighthawks – xyz	16	14	2	.875	0.0	8–0	6–2	249	194	+55	15.56	12.12
2	Buffalo Bandits – x	16	10	6	.625	4.0	6–2	4–4	207	188	+19	12.94	11.75
3	Minnesota Swarm – x	16	9	7	.562	5.0	4–4	5–3	200	207	−7	12.50	12.94
4	Toronto Rock – x	16	6	10	.375	8.0	3–5	3–5	187	183	+4	11.69	11.44
5	Chicago Shamrox	16	6	10	.375	8.0	4–4	2–6	176	191	−15	11.00	11.94
6	Philadelphia Wings	16	6	10	.375	8.0	4–4	2–6	178	186	−8	11.12	11.62
7	New York Titans	16	4	12	.250	10.0	3–5	1–7	195	233	−38	12.19	14.56

West Division
P	Team	GP	W	L	PCT	GB	Home	Road	GF	GA	Diff	GF/GP	GA/GP
1	Colorado Mammoth – xy	16	12	4	.750	0.0	7–1	5–3	209	179	+30	13.06	11.19
2	Calgary Roughnecks – x	16	9	7	.562	3.0	4–4	5–3	219	202	+17	13.69	12.62
3	Arizona Sting – x	16	9	7	.562	3.0	6–2	3–5	188	181	+7	11.75	11.31
4	San Jose Stealth – x	16	9	7	.562	3.0	4–4	5–3	181	170	+11	11.31	10.62
5	Edmonton Rush	16	6	10	.375	6.0	4–4	2–6	160	189	−29	10.00	11.81
6	Portland LumberJax	16	4	12	.250	8.0	3–5	1–7	153	199	−46	9.56	12.44

x: Clinched playoff berth; c: Clinched playoff berth by crossing over to another division; y: Clinched division; z: Clinched best regular season record; GP: Games Played
W: Wins; L: Losses; GB: Games back; PCT: Win percentage; Home: Record at Home; Road: Record on the Road; GF: Goals scored; GA: Goals allowed
Differential: Difference between goals scored and allowed; GF/GP: Average number of goals scored per game; GA/GP: Average number of goals allowed per game

=== Game log ===
Game	Date	Opponent	Location	Score	OT	Attendance	Record
1	January 12, 2007	San Jose Stealth	Pengrowth Saddledome	L 16–17	OT	12,370	0–1
2	January 13, 2007	@ Edmonton Rush	Rexall Place	W 13–12		10,702	1–1
3	January 20, 2007	Colorado Mammoth	Pengrowth Saddledome	W 17–13		11,582	2–1
4	January 27, 2007	Minnesota Swarm	Pengrowth Saddledome	W 15–14		11,462	3–1
5	February 3, 2007	@ San Jose Stealth	HP Pavilion at San Jose	W 15–11		6,258	4–1
6	February 10, 2007	Philadelphia Wings	Pengrowth Saddledome	L 7–10		14,175	4–2
7	February 18, 2007	@ Colorado Mammoth	Pepsi Center	L 12–15		17,911	4–3
8	February 23, 2007	Toronto Rock	Pengrowth Saddledome	L 9–12		13,672	4–4
9	February 24, 2007	@ Toronto Rock	Air Canada Centre	W 17–13		15,312	5–4
10	March 16, 2007	@ Arizona Sting	Jobing.com Arena	L 10–14		5,503	5–5
11	March 24, 2007	Arizona Sting	Pengrowth Saddledome	W 14–12		12,768	6–5
12	March 30, 2007	@ Portland LumberJax	Rose Garden	L 12–13		5,963	6–6
13	March 31, 2007	Portland LumberJax	Pengrowth Saddledome	W 21–11		11,915	7–6
14	April 6, 2007	Edmonton Rush	Pengrowth Saddledome	L 12–13		13,715	7–7
15	April 13, 2007	@ Arizona Sting	Jobing.com Arena	W 12–11		6,556	8–7
16	April 14, 2007	@ Edmonton Rush	Rexall Place	W 17–11		14,790	9–7

== Playoffs ==
=== Game log ===
Game	Date	Opponent	Location	Score	OT	Attendance	Record
Division Semifinal	April 21, 2007	Arizona Sting	Pengrowth Saddledome	L 9–13		10,057	0–1

== Player stats ==
=== Runners (Top 10) ===
Note: GP = Games played; G = Goals; A = Assists; Pts = Points; LB = Loose Balls; PIM = Penalty minutes

Player	GP	G	A	Pts	LB	PIM
Lewis Ratcliff	16	50	54	104	98	6
Tracey Kelusky	16	35	53	88	95	0
Kaleb Toth	16	28	47	75	53	24
Scott Ranger	16	24	19	43	65	15
Kyle Goundrey	15	11	28	39	59	23
Jeff Shattler	16	16	21	37	114	10
Nolan Heavenor	16	15	18	33	64	18
Kerry Susheski	12	12	10	22	38	48
Jeff Moleski	15	9	10	19	108	12
Totals		336	555	397	1111	58

=== Goaltenders ===
Note: GP = Games played; MIN = Minutes; W = Wins; L = Losses; GA = Goals against; Sv% = Save percentage; GAA = Goals against average

Player	GP	MIN	W	L	GA	Sv%	GAA
Andrew Leyshon	16	737:30	5	7	161	.737	13.10
Ryan Avery	16	231:09	4	0	41	.782	10.64
Totals			9	7	202	.748	12.63

== Awards ==
Player	Award
Tracey Kelusky	NLL Sportsmanship Award
Lewis Ratcliff	Second Team All-Pro
Taylor Wray	All-Stars
Tracey Kelusky	All-Stars
Lewis Ratcliff	All-Stars

== Roster ==
No.		Position	Player
24	(Canada)	Fwd	Anderson, Scott
60	(Canada)	Goalie	Avery, Ryan
85	(Canada)	Fwd	Cable, Shawn
7	(United States)	Def	Francey, Tyler
26	(Canada)	Fwd	Gelsvik, Craig
19	(Canada)	Fwd	Goundrey, Kyle
40	(Canada)	Trans	Heavenor, Nolan
34	(Canada)	Fwd	Hinton, Luke
17	(Canada)	Fwd	Kelusky, Tracey
41	(Canada)	Goalie	Leyshon, Andrew
37	(Canada)	Def	McBride, Andrew

No.		Position	Player
11	(Canada)	Def	McNish, Ryan
14	(Canada)	Trans	Moleski, Jeff
20	(Canada)	Def	Ogilvie, Andy
74	(Canada)	Def	Phillips, Jesse
71	(Canada)	Fwd	Ranger, Scott
42	(Canada)	Fwd	Ratcliff, Lewis
77	(Canada)	Def	Shattler, Jeff
84	(Canada)	Trans	Susheski, Kerry
06	(Canada)	?	Gaughan, Derek
9	(Canada)	Fwd	Toth, Kaleb
4	(Canada)	Trans	Wray, Devan
44	(Canada)	Def	Wray, Taylor

== See also ==
- 2007 NLL season
