= Jamie Batley =

American lacrosse coach

Jamie Batley is a lacrosse coach who has coached several teams in the NLL and the Major Series Lacrosse. Batley is also a former player, who played with the Buffalo Bandits, Syracuse Smash, and Pittsburgh CrosseFire.

Batley began his coaching career in Colorado in 2002, when he was hired by new coach Rod Jensen as the offensive coordinator. When Jensen was fired in February 2003, Batley took over as interim coach, and the "interim" tag was removed less than two weeks later. Batley led the Mammoth to a 27–16 record in two and a half seasons, making the playoffs each year, but his contract was not renewed after the 2005 season.

A year later, Batley was hired by the expansion Chicago Shamrox to be their first-ever coach and general manager. After consecutive 6–10 seasons, the Shamrox suspended operations shortly before the 2009 season began, and Batley was out of work again, though not for long.

In January 2009, Batley became the head coach of the Toronto Rock after the Rock fired Glenn Clark. The Rock were 5-8 after Batley took over, and missed the playoffs for the second straight year. After the season, Mike Kloepfer resigned as Director of Lacrosse Operations of the Rock, and Batley applied for the job but was turned down. After Terry Sanderson was announced as the new GM, Batley was informed that he would not be returning as head coach of the Rock.

In March 2016, Batley replaced Dan Perreault as head coach of the Vancouver Stealth, he left the team in 2018.

== Statistics ==
=== NLL ===
		Regular Season						Playoffs
Season	Team	GP	G	A	Pts	LB	PIM	GP	G	A	Pts	LB	PIM
1995	Buffalo	8	4	5	9	29	16	1	1	2	3	5	0
1998	Syracuse	8	9	6	15	27	24	--	--	--	--	--	--
1999	Buffalo	12	12	19	31	58	17	--	--	--	--	--	--
2000	Pittsburgh	2	0	2	2	6	2	--	--	--	--	--	--
NLL totals		30	25	32	57	120	59	1	1	2	3	5	0

=== NLL head coaching statistics ===
Team	Season	Regular Season				Playoffs				Playoff result
Team	Season	GC	W	L	W%	GC	W	L	W%	Playoff result
Colorado Mammoth	2003*	7	5	2	.714	2	1	1	.500	Lost Semifinal (TOR)
Colorado Mammoth	2004	16	14	2	.875	1	0	1	.000	Lost Semifinal (CGY)
Colorado Mammoth	2005	16	8	8	.500	1	0	1	.000	Lost Quarterfinal (ARZ)
Chicago Shamrox	2007	16	6	10	.375	–	–	–	–	Did not qualify
Chicago Shamrox	2008	16	6	10	.375	–	–	–	–	Did not qualify
Toronto Rock	2009*	13	5	8	.385	–	–	–	–	Did not qualify
Vancouver Stealth	2017	18	9	9	.500	1	0	1	.000	Lost Division Semifinal (COL)
Totals:	7	102	53	49	.520	5	1	4	.200	

* - interim head coach
