= Matt Roik =

Canadian lacrosse player

Personal information
- Nationality: Canadian
- Born: November 17, 1979 (age 46) Dunnville, Ontario
- Height: 6 ft 5 in (196 cm)
- Weight: 225 lb (102 kg; 16 st 1 lb)

Sport
- Position: Goalie
- Shoots: Right
- NLL draft: 73rd overall, 1999; Toronto Rock
- NLL teams: Toronto Rock; Washington Stealth; San Jose Stealth; Chicago Shamrox; Philadelphia Wings; Anaheim Storm; New Jersey Storm
- OLA team: Barrie Lakeshores
- Pro career: 2002–

Matt Roik (born November 17, 1979, in Dunnville, Ontario) is a Canadian professional lacrosse goaltender who has played in the National Lacrosse League. Roik most recently played for the Toronto Rock, and has also played for the Washington Stealth, San Jose Stealth, Chicago Shamrox, Philadelphia Wings, Anaheim Storm, and New Jersey Storm.

== NLL career ==
Roik was selected with the final pick (72nd overall) of the 1999 NLL Entry Draft by the Toronto Rock, but was subsequently traded to the New Jersey Storm. He played two seasons in New Jersey, and stayed with the organization as they moved to Anaheim. After two seasons in Anaheim, the Storm folded, and Roik was acquired by the San Jose Stealth in the Anaheim dispersal draft. Before ever playing with the Stealth, Roik was dealt to the Philadelphia Wings in exchange for the sixth pick in the 2005 draft.

Roik played two seasons in Philadelphia before being traded once again, this time to the Chicago Shamrox in March 2008. On August 29, 2008, Roik was part of a blockbuster trade, going to San Jose in return for All-Star goalie Anthony Cosmo.

Roik has been named the NLL's Defensive Player of the Week five times:

- Week 5 -- 2012
- Week 1 -- 2006
- Week 14 -- 2005 (also named "Overall" Player of the Week)
- Week 1 -- 2003
- Week 14 -- 2002

While with the Wings, Roik was named as the Wings' "Grassroots Marketing Coordinator" in an effort to grow new fan support and increase ticket sales.

After three seasons with the Stealth, Roik was traded to the Toronto Rock for Kyle Ross in July 2011, but only ten games into the 2012 season, Roik was released by the Rock.

== OLA / WLA career ==
Roik is currently a member of the Victoria Jokers, of the VILL. In 2024, Roik's first season with the Jokers, the team finished 2nd to the Victoria Blazers for the VILL Championship. The Jokers forced a deciding mini game, with a 8-7 win over the Blazers, but fell short of clinching the championship title. The Jokers finished 3rd overall in the regular season, and Roik finished with an .825 save percentage plus 5 assists.

Roik was a member of the Barrie Lakeshores of Major Series Lacrosse (sanctioned by the Ontario Lacrosse Association) where he played under Wings Head Coach Lindsay Sanderson.

Roik was a member of the 2003 Mann Cup Champion Victoria Shamrocks of the Western Lacrosse Association, and was named MVP of the 2000 Minto Cup while he was a member of the Burnaby Lakers.

== Statistics ==
=== NLL ===
Matt Roik		Regular Season								Playoffs							
Season	Team	GP	Min	W	L	GA	GAA	Sv	Sv %	GP	Min	W	L	GA	GAA	Sv	Sv %
2002	New Jersey Storm	16	595:18	5	6	138	13.91	430	0.757	–	–	–	–	–	–	–	–
2003	New Jersey Storm	8	289:31	1	4	69	14.30	185	0.728	–	–	–	–	–	–	–	–
2004	Anaheim Storm	14	304:24	0	5	77	15.18	188	0.709	–	–	–	–	–	–	–	–
2005	Anaheim Storm	13	681:58	4	8	147	12.93	387	0.725	–	–	–	–	–	–	–	–
2006	Philadelphia Wings	15	809:27	8	5	154	11.42	521	0.772	–	–	–	–	–	–	–	–
2007	Philadelphia Wings	14	744:24	6	6	138	11.12	423	0.754	–	–	–	–	–	–	–	–
2008	Chicago Shamrox	9	497:25	5	3	102	12.30	378	0.788	–	–	–	–	–	–	–	–
2009	San Jose Stealth	13	585:46	4	7	111	11.37	358	0.763	1	36:49	0	1	8	13.04	23	0.742
2010	Washington Stealth	9	434:27	6	1	76	10.50	248	0.765	3	0:00	0	0	0	0.00	0	0.000
2011	Washington Stealth	7	306:36	3	2	63	12.33	192	0.753	1	0:54	0	0	1	66.67	0	0.000
2012	Toronto Rock	10	546:32	4	4	114	12.52	300	0.725	–	–	–	–	–	–	–	–
2013	Colorado Mammoth	7	299:07	2	2	68	13.64	174	0.719	–	–	–	–	–	–	–	–
2013	Washington Stealth	3	15:37	0	1	6	23.05	9	0.600	1	2:20	0	0	0	0.00	2	1.000
2014	Vancouver Stealth	9	313:00	0	6	66	12.65	182	0.734	–	–	–	–	–	–	–	–
		147	6,423:32	48	60	1,329	12.41	3,975	0.749	6	40:03	0	1	9	13.48	25	0.735
Career Total:		153	6,463:35	48	61	1,338	12.42	4,000	0.749								

GP–Games played;Min–Minutes played;W–Wins;L–Losses;GA–Goals against;GAA–Goals against average;Sv–Number of saves;Sv %–Save percentage;
