= Rusty Kruger =

Canadian lacrosse player and coach

Personal information
- Nickname: K-Dog
- Born: March 26, 1975 (age 51) Orangeville, Ontario, Canada
- Height: 5 ft 7 in (170 cm)
- Weight: 175 lb (79 kg; 12 st 7 lb)

Sport
- Position: Forward
- Shoots: Left
- NLL draft: 6th overall, 1997; Philadelphia Wings
- NLL team Former teams: Buffalo Bandits; Chicago Shamrox; Toronto Rock; San Jose Stealth; Albany Attack; New York Saints; Rochester Knighthawks
- Pro career: 1998–2008

Rusty Kruger (born March 26, 1975) is a Canadian retired lacrosse player in the National Lacrosse League and a current assistant coach with the Buffalo Bandits.

== Statistics ==
=== NLL ===
| Rusty Kruger | | Regular season | | | | | | | | | Playoffs | | | | | | | | |
| Season | Team | GP | G | A | Pts | LB | PIM | Pts/GP | LB/GP | PIM/GP | GP | G | A | Pts | LB | PIM | Pts/GP | LB/GP | PIM/GP |
|---|---|---|---|---|---|---|---|---|---|---|---|---|---|---|---|---|---|---|---|
| 1998 | Rochester Knighthawks | 3 | 0 | 1 | 1 | 8 | 15 | 0.33 | 2.67 | 5.00 | – | – | – | – | – | – | – | – | – |
| 1999 | Rochester Knighthawks | 11 | 17 | 8 | 25 | 49 | 16 | 2.27 | 4.45 | 1.45 | 2 | 3 | 2 | 5 | 7 | 4 | 2.50 | 3.50 | 2.00 |
| 2000 | Rochester Knighthawks | 9 | 12 | 13 | 25 | 30 | 25 | 2.78 | 3.33 | 2.78 | 2 | 1 | 2 | 3 | 8 | 4 | 1.50 | 4.00 | 2.00 |
| 2001 | Rochester Knighthawks | 14 | 10 | 20 | 30 | 64 | 40 | 2.14 | 4.57 | 2.86 | 1 | 1 | 1 | 2 | 8 | 0 | 2.00 | 8.00 | 0.00 |
| 2002 | New York Saints | 14 | 28 | 17 | 45 | 87 | 33 | 3.21 | 6.21 | 2.36 | – | – | – | – | – | – | – | – | – |
| 2003 | New York Saints | 5 | 11 | 8 | 19 | 28 | 14 | 3.80 | 5.60 | 2.80 | – | – | – | – | – | – | – | – | – |
| 2003 | Albany Attack | 10 | 13 | 6 | 19 | 37 | 15 | 1.90 | 3.70 | 1.50 | – | – | – | – | – | – | – | – | – |
| 2004 | San Jose Stealth | 15 | 10 | 10 | 20 | 51 | 34 | 1.33 | 3.40 | 2.27 | 1 | 6 | 1 | 7 | 0 | 0 | 7.00 | 0.00 | 0.00 |
| 2005 | Toronto Rock | 10 | 9 | 13 | 22 | 37 | 20 | 2.20 | 3.70 | 2.00 | 1 | 0 | 0 | 0 | 4 | 0 | 0.00 | 4.00 | 0.00 |
| 2006 | Toronto Rock | 11 | 7 | 13 | 20 | 38 | 28 | 1.82 | 3.45 | 2.55 | – | – | – | – | – | – | – | – | – |
| 2007 | Toronto Rock | 5 | 3 | 1 | 4 | 25 | 12 | 0.80 | 5.00 | 2.40 | – | – | – | – | – | – | – | – | – |
| 2007 | Chicago Shamrox | 5 | 4 | 5 | 9 | 23 | 2 | 1.80 | 4.60 | 0.40 | – | – | – | – | – | – | – | – | – |
| 2008 | Buffalo Bandits | 3 | 1 | 2 | 3 | 6 | 15 | 1.00 | 2.00 | 5.00 | – | – | – | – | – | – | – | – | – |
| | | 115 | 125 | 117 | 242 | 483 | 269 | 2.10 | 4.20 | 2.34 | 7 | 11 | 6 | 17 | 27 | 8 | 2.43 | 3.86 | 1.14 |
| Career Total: | | 122 | 136 | 123 | 259 | 510 | 277 | 2.12 | 4.18 | 2.27 | | | | | | | | | |

GP–Games played; G–Goals; A–Assists; Pts–Points; LB–Loose balls; PIM–Penalty minutes; Pts/GP–Points per games played; LB/GP–Loose balls per games played; PIM/GP–Penalty minutes per games played.
