= Bill McGlone =

American lacrosse player (born 1984)

Personal information
- Nickname: Billy Mac
- Nationality: American
- Born: April 24, 1984 (age 42) Ridley, Pennsylvania, U.S.
- Height: 6 ft 2 in (188 cm)
- Weight: 220 lb (100 kg; 15 st 10 lb)

Sport
- Position: Midfield
- NLL draft: 41st overall, 2006; Chicago Shamrox
- NLL team Former teams: Philadelphia Wings; Toronto Rock; Chicago Shamrox
- MLL team Former teams: Boston Cannons; Denver Outlaws; San Francisco Dragons; Washington Bayhawks; Chicago Machine
- NCAA team: University of Maryland
- Pro career: 2006–

Bill McGlone (born April 24, 1984) is a professional lacrosse player from Ridley, Pennsylvania. McGlone plays for the Boston Cannons of Major League Lacrosse and the Philadelphia Wings of the National Lacrosse League.

== Collegiate career ==
McGlone was a three-time All-American for the University of Maryland Terps, and twice named to the All-ACC team. In 2006, he was the only repeat first team USILA All-American selection from the 2005 team. He was also the first team captain selected as a junior in 30 years and retained the position his senior in 2006.

He attended Ridley High School outside of Philadelphia, where he was a two time All-American in lacrosse, All-state Receiver/Cornerback in football and an All-Delco point guard for the basketball team. McGlone teamed with Brett Moyer to win two straight Pennsylvania high school lacrosse title, and where he was an all-state football player as wide receiver.

== MLL career ==
McGlone was selected fifth overall in the 2006 Major League Lacrosse Collegiate Draft by the Baltimore Bayhawks. He played ten games for the Bayhawks in the 2006 Season.

During the 2008 MLL season, McGlone was traded to the San Francisco Dragons.

== NLL career ==
McGlone was drafted with the third pick of the fourth round on the 2006 NLL Entry Draft by the Chicago Shamrox. He was awarded Rookie of the Week honours in week two of the 2007 season for leading the Shamrox to their first franchise victory. After the season, McGlone was named to the All-Rookie team.

On March 24, 2007, McGlone (who attended Ridley High School) played in front of his hometown crowd versus the Philadelphia Wings. In honor of high school teammate, Nick Colleluori, who died from non-Hodgkin's Lymphoma in November 2006, McGlone donated his game salary to the HEADstrong Foundation for Cancer Research. Colleluori, who attended Hofstra University, was also honored by Blake Miller of the New York Titans earlier in the season. McGlone scored three goals and recorded one assist in the contest.

Shortly before the 2009 season began, the Shamrox suspended operations, and a dispersal draft was held. McGlone was selected third overall by the Toronto Rock. After one season with the Rock, McGlone was traded to the Philadelphia Wings along with Kevin Huntley for Peter Jacobs.

== Statistics ==
=== University of Maryland ===
Season	GP	G	A	Pts	PPG
2003	15	4	1	5	--
2004	16	25	11	36	--
2005	17	26	7	33	--
2006	17	22	11	33	--
Totals	65	77	30	107

=== NLL ===
Bill McGlone		Regular season									Playoffs								
Season	Team	GP	G	A	Pts	LB	PIM	Pts/GP	LB/GP	PIM/GP	GP	G	A	Pts	LB	PIM	Pts/GP	LB/GP	PIM/GP
2007	Chicago Shamrox	16	22	18	40	70	4	2.50	4.38	0.25	–	–	–	–	–	–	–	–	–
2008	Chicago Shamrox	15	10	11	21	60	6	1.40	4.00	0.40	–	–	–	–	–	–	–	–	–
2009	Toronto Rock	11	8	9	17	49	4	1.55	4.45	0.36	–	–	–	–	–	–	–	–	–
2010	Philadelphia Wings	15	19	16	35	61	13	2.33	4.07	0.87	–	–	–	–	–	–	–	–	–
2011	Philadelphia Wings	15	3	9	12	44	4	0.80	2.93	0.27	–	–	–	–	–	–	–	–	–
2012	Philadelphia Wings	1	0	0	0	2	2	0.00	2.00	2.00	–	–	–	–	–	–	–	–	–
2014	Philadelphia Wings	1	1	3	4	2	0	4.00	2.00	0.00	–	–	–	–	–	–	–	–	–
		74	63	66	129	288	33	1.74	3.89	0.45	0	0	0	0	0	0	0.00	0.00	0.00
Career Total:		74	63	66	129	288	33	1.74	3.89	0.45									

GP–Games played; G–Goals; A–Assists; Pts–Points; LB–Loose balls; PIM–Penalty minutes; Pts/GP–Points per games played; LB/GP–Loose balls per games played; PIM/GP–Penalty minutes per games played.

=== MLL ===
		Regular Season							Playoffs
Season	Team	GP	G	2ptG	A	Pts	LB	PIM	GP	G	2ptG	A	Pts	LB	PIM
2006	Baltimore	10	19	1	2	22	18	0	-	-	-	-	-	-	-
2007	Washington	12	13	1	2	16	29	0	-	-	-	-	-	-	-
2008	San Francisco	7	15	1	8	24	16	-	-	-	-	-	-	-	-
2009	Chicago	10	13	1	3	17	3	1.5	-	-	-	-	-	-	-
2010	Chicago	10	16	1	5	22	-	-	-	-	-	-	-	-	-
MLL Totals		32	45	1	7	55	50	1.5	-	-	-	-	-	-	-

== Accomplishments ==
- 2006 NCAA Division I First Team All-American
- 2005 NCAA Division I First Team All-American

== See also ==
Lacrosse in Pennsylvania
