= Arizona Sting =

Former NLL professional box lacrosse team

- Sport: Box lacrosse
- First season: 2004
- Disbanded: 2008
- Last season: 2007
- League: National Lacrosse League
- Division: Western
- Team history: Columbus Landsharks (2001–2003)
- Based in: Glendale, Arizona
- Arena: Gila River Arena
- Colors: Brick, Black, Sand
- Head coach: Bob Hamley
- General manager: Bob Hamley
- Championships: 0
- Finals appearances: 2 (2005, 2007)
- Local media: COX 7
- Website: www.arizonasting.com

The Arizona Sting was a professional American box lacrosse team and a member of the National Lacrosse League from 2004 to 2007. They played at Nationwide Arena in Columbus, Ohio, from 2001 to 2003 as the Columbus Landsharks, and in 2003 moved to Glendale, Arizona. The team adopted the name Sting in November 2003 and began playing in the Glendale Arena (now Desert Diamond Arena).

In 2005, the Sting defeated the 2004 NLL champion Calgary Roughnecks to win the franchise's first-ever West Division title. The Sting fell 19–13 to the East Division champion Toronto Rock in the league championships.

== Team history ==
On October 16, 2007, the NLL announced that the 2008 season had been cancelled due to the failure of the league and the Professional Lacrosse Players' Association to reach a new collective bargaining agreement. However, the negotiations continued and, on October 25, the league announced that a new seven-year agreement had been reached, and that the season would be played. A new schedule was announced on November 2, 2007, but only included 12 of the expected 14 teams; the Sting and Boston Blazers had been removed. According to a news article posted on the Sting website,

When the NLL Board of Governors cancelled the season on Oct. 16, we ceased our Arizona Sting business operations. On Oct. 25, when the two sides came to an agreement on a new seven-year CBA, the league announced that there would be a season in 2008. The NLL then gave all clubs an option to be placed on voluntary inactive status, whereby the team’s players could be subject to a dispersal draft. Dispersed players may be loaned to other NLL clubs for the 2008 season and returned to their original clubs in 2009. At that time we reviewed our organization and the challenges we faced with fielding and operating a championship-caliber club both on and off the field in a reduced time frame. After our review we made a very difficult decision to declare inactive status for the 2008 season.

Prior to the 2009 NLL season, the Arizona Sting ceased operations and its players were put in a dispersal draft.

== All time record ==
Season	Division	W-L	Finish	Home	Road	GF	GA	Coach	Playoffs
2004	Western	7–9	4th	6–2	1–7	200	208	Bob Hamley	Missed playoffs
2005	Western	9–7	2nd	5–3	4–4	209	209	Bob Hamley	Lost Champions Cup Final
2006	Western	8–8	4th	4–4	4–4	198	199	Bob Hamley	Lost division finals
2007	Western	9–7	3rd	6–2	3–5	188	181	Bob Hamley	Lost Champions Cup Final
Total	4 seasons	33–31		21–11	12–20	795	797		
Playoff Totals		5–3		2–1	3–2	107	100		

== Playoff results ==
Season	Game	Visiting	Home
2005	Division Semifinal	Colorado 13	Arizona 16
2005	Division Final	Arizona 19	Calgary 15
2005	Championship	Arizona 13	Toronto 19
2006	Division Semifinal	Arizona 14	Portland 11
2006	Division Final	Arizona 12	Colorado 13
2007	Division Semifinal	Arizona 13	Calgary 9
2007	Division Final	San Jose 7	Arizona 9
2007	Championship*	Arizona 11	Rochester 13

* the Arizona Sting hosted the Champion's Cup Finals at Jobing.com Arena. The Knighthawks had the overall top seed in the playoffs, but were unable to host the Championship game due to a scheduling conflict at the Blue Cross Arena.

== See also ==
- Arizona Sting seasons
- Arizona Sting players
