= Chicago Shamrox =

Former NLL professional box lacrosse team

- Sport: Box lacrosse
- Founded: 2006
- Disbanded: 2008
- League: National Lacrosse League
- Division: Eastern
- Location: Hoffman Estates, Illinois
- Arena: Sears Centre
- Colors: Black, Green, Orange, White
- Head coach: Jamie Batley
- General manager: Jamie Batley
- Championships: 0
- Local media: Comcast SportsNet Chicago, ION Television
- Website: www.chicagoshamrox.com

The Chicago Shamrox were an American professional lacrosse team that played in the National Lacrosse League (NLL) in the 2007 and 2008 NLL seasons. Home matches were played at the Sears Centre in northwest suburban Hoffman Estates, Illinois. The team's ownership group was headed by Kevin Loughery Jr., the son of former NBA head coach Kevin Loughery. The new franchise was announced on February 16, 2006, and the name "Shamrox" was chosen in May 2006.

During their inaugural season in 2007, the Shamrox finished the season 6–10 and tied for fourth place in the NLL East Division with the Toronto Rock and Philadelphia Wings. But, due to their record inside the division, the Shamrox lost the playoff tiebreaker to the Rock and missed the playoffs.

On December 12, 2008, the Chicago Shamrox franchise closed their doors indefinitely. For the weeks and months before, owner Kevin Loughery Jr. had been trying to find a new ownership group. When the new group wasn't found, the team ceased operations 15 days before the opening night against the Rochester Knighthawks The team suspended operations until further notice.

== Milestones ==
- May 11, 2006: Connie Kowal was announced as the team's first president and Phil Ryan was named Vice President of Lacrosse Operations.
- June 1, 2006: Jamie Batley was named the first Head Coach and General Manager in Chicago Shamrox history.
- July 12, 2006: Goaltender Brandon Miller is selected as the first overall pick in the 2006 NLL Expansion Draft; making him the first player in the history of the Chicago Shamrox.
- September 13, 2006: The Shamrox select Josh Wasson with their first pick (12th overall) in the 2006 NLL Entry Draft. Wasson formerly starred at the University of Hartford and for the Peterborough Lakers of the Ontario Lacrosse Association.
- January 6, 2007: The Shamrox play their first-ever regular season game, a home game against their expansion cousins the New York Titans. The Shamrox win the game 15–12. Forward Jason Clark scored the first goal in franchise history at 2:17 of the 1st quarter, assisted by defenseman Tom Montour and Goaltender Brandon Miller. Miller made 46 saves on 58 shots to earn the win. 8,456 people were in attendance at the Sears Centre for the inaugural game, setting the attendance record (at the time) for the Sears Centre.
- April 14, 2007: The Shamrox defeat the Philadelphia Wings 17–11 at the Sears Centre in Hoffman Estates, Illinois to finish their inaugural season 6–10 and tied with the Philadelphia Wings and Toronto Rock for the fourth and final playoff spot in the NLL East Division, but miss the playoffs due to their intra-division record. 7,096 fans were in attendance at the final game for "Fan Appreciation Night," which included numerous fan giveaways, a silent auction, and a performance by the local Chicago band, Ready...Break.

== Awards ==
- Brandon Miller Defensive Player of the Week - 2007 Week #2 vs. the New York Titans and Week #5 vs. the San Jose Stealth.
- Bill McGlone Rookie of the Week - 2007 Week #2 vs. the New York Titans.
- Cody Jacobs Rookie of the Week - 2007 Week #9 vs. the Minnesota Swarm.

== All time record ==
Season	Division	W-L	Finish	Home	Road	GF	GA	Coach	Playoffs
2007	Eastern	6–10	5th	4–4	2–6	176	191	Jamie Batley	Missed playoffs
2008	Eastern	6–10	7th	3–5	3–5	176	212	Jamie Batley	Missed playoffs
Total	2 seasons	12–20		7–9	5–11	352	403		

== Draft history ==
=== NLL Entry Draft ===
First Round Selections

- 2006: Josh Wasson (12th overall)
- 2007: Kevin Ross (12th overall)

== See also ==
- National Lacrosse League
- Box lacrosse
- Lacrosse
- Chicago Shamrox seasons
- Chicago Shamrox players
