= 2006 Philadelphia Wings season =

2006 Philadelphia Wings
- League: NLL
- Division: 5th East
- 2006 record: 8–8
- Home record: 5–3
- Road record: 3–5
- Goals for: 184
- Goals against: 184
- General Manager: Lindsay Sanderson
- Coach: Lindsay Sanderson
- Captain: Thomas Hajek
- Arena: Wachovia Center
- Average attendance: 11,623

Team leaders
- Goals: Sean Greenhalgh (31)
- Assists: Dan Marohl (52)
- Points: Sean Greenhalgh (73); Dan Marohl (73)
- Penalties in minutes: Rob VanBeek (72)
- Loose Balls: Peter Jacobs (147)
- Wins: Matt Roik (8)
- Goals against average: Erik Miller (11.29)

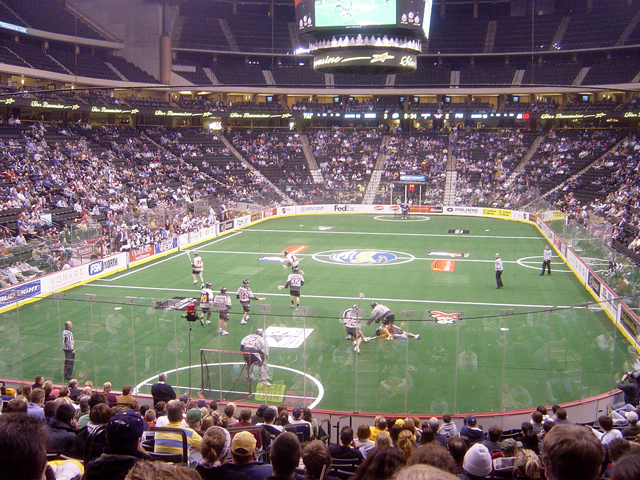
The 2006 Philadelphia Wings visiting the Minnesota Swarm at the Xcel Energy Center, St. Paul, Minnesota.

The Philadelphia Wings are a lacrosse team based in Philadelphia, Pennsylvania playing in the National Lacrosse League (NLL). The 2006 season was the 20th in franchise history.

Other than the emergence of talented rookie Sean Greenhalgh, the 2006 season was largely forgettable for the Wings, who finished 8–8 and out of the playoffs for a fourth straight year.

== Regular season ==
=== Conference standings ===
East Division
P	Team	GP	W	L	PCT	GB	Home	Road	GF	GA	Diff	GF/GP	GA/GP
1	Buffalo Bandits – xyz	16	11	5	.688	0.0	6–2	5–3	193	167	+26	12.06	10.44
2	Rochester Knighthawks – x	16	9	7	.562	2.0	6–2	3–5	196	180	+16	12.25	11.25
3	Toronto Rock – x	16	8	8	.500	3.0	5–3	3–5	182	179	+3	11.38	11.19
4	Minnesota Swarm – x	16	8	8	.500	3.0	3–5	5–3	158	171	−13	9.88	10.69
5	Philadelphia Wings	16	8	8	.500	3.0	5–3	3–5	184	184	−-0	11.50	11.50

West Division
P	Team	GP	W	L	PCT	GB	Home	Road	GF	GA	Diff	GF/GP	GA/GP
1	Portland LumberJax – xy	16	11	5	.688	0.0	5–3	6–2	188	177	+11	11.75	11.06
2	Colorado Mammoth – x	16	10	6	.625	1.0	6–2	4–4	200	172	+28	12.50	10.75
3	Calgary Roughnecks – x	16	9	7	.562	2.0	4–4	5–3	183	178	+5	11.44	11.12
4	Arizona Sting – x	16	8	8	.500	3.0	4–4	4–4	198	199	−1	12.38	12.44
5	San Jose Stealth	16	5	11	.312	6.0	3–5	2–6	151	174	−23	9.44	10.88
6	Edmonton Rush	16	1	15	.062	10.0	0–8	1–7	150	202	−52	9.38	12.62

x: Clinched playoff berth; c: Clinched playoff berth by crossing over to another division; y: Clinched division; z: Clinched best regular season record; GP: Games Played
W: Wins; L: Losses; GB: Games back; PCT: Win percentage; Home: Record at Home; Road: Record on the Road; GF: Goals scored; GA: Goals allowed
Differential: Difference between goals scored and allowed; GF/GP: Average number of goals scored per game; GA/GP: Average number of goals allowed per game

=== Game log ===
Game	Date	Opponent	Location	Score	OT	Attendance	Record
1	December 30, 2006	@ Colorado Mammoth	Pepsi Center	W 13–11		15,726	1–0
2	January 6, 2006	@ Minnesota Swarm	Xcel Energy Center	W 15–11		8,024	2–0
3	January 14, 2006	Minnesota Swarm	Wachovia Center	L 10–13		11,874	2–1
4	January 21, 2006	@ San Jose Stealth	HP Pavilion at San Jose	W 10–7		5,217	3–1
5	February 10, 2006	@ Minnesota Swarm	Xcel Energy Center	L 10–11		7,524	3–2
6	February 11, 2006	Buffalo Bandits	Wachovia Center	W 10–9		11,207	4–2
7	February 18, 2006	Portland LumberJax	Wachovia Center	L 12–15		12,796	4–3
8	February 24, 2006	@ Toronto Rock	Air Canada Centre	L 11–12	OT	16,164	4–4
9	March 4, 2006	Toronto Rock	Wachovia Center	W 14–12		12,165	5–4
10	March 10, 2006	@ Rochester Knighthawks	Blue Cross Arena	L 8–17		9,052	5–5
11	March 11, 2006	Rochester Knighthawks	Wachovia Center	W 16–12		10,959	6–5
12	March 25, 2006	Arizona Sting	Wachovia Center	L 12–13		11,693	6–6
13	April 1, 2006	Rochester Knighthawks	Wachovia Center	W 8–7		12,001	7–6
14	April 8, 2006	@ Toronto Rock	Air Canada Centre	L 14–15	OT	18,400	7–7
15	April 14, 2006	@ Buffalo Bandits	HSBC Arena	L 7–8		10,379	7–8
16	April 15, 2006	Buffalo Bandits	Wachovia Center	W 14–11		12,796	8–8

== Player stats ==
=== Runners (Top 10) ===
Note: GP = Games played; G = Goals; A = Assists; Pts = Points; LB = Loose Balls; PIM = Penalty minutes

Player	GP	G	A	Pts	LB	PIM
Sean Greenhalgh	16	31	42	73	66	4
Dan Marohl	16	21	52	73	69	2
Jake Bergey	16	27	28	55	43	11
Jeff Ratcliffe	15	29	15	44	59	14
Keith Cromwell	15	12	27	39	39	2
Rob VanBeek	16	7	19	26	110	72
Marc Morley	15	12	12	24	48	6
Luke Wiles	8	10	13	23	31	11
Mike Regan	6	6	11	17	24	10
Totals		298	482	370	1061	37

=== Goaltenders ===
Note: GP = Games played; MIN = Minutes; W = Wins; L = Losses; GA = Goals against; Sv% = Save percentage; GAA = Goals against average

Player	GP	MIN	W	L	GA	Sv%	GAA
Matt Roik	16	809:27	8	5	154	.772	11.42
Erik Miller	14	148:51	0	3	28	.728	11.29
Totals			8	8	184	.764	11.50

== Awards ==
Player	Award
Sean Greenhalgh	Sportsmanship Award
Sean Greenhalgh	All-Rookie Team
Sean Greenhalgh	Rookie of the Month, January
Thomas Hajek	All-Stars
Jake Bergey	All-Stars
Glenn Clark	All-Stars
Dan Marohl	All-Stars

== Transactions ==
=== Trades ===
March 10, 2006	To Philadelphia Wings Mike Regan first round pick, 2006 entry draft	To San Jose Stealth Luke Wiles; Chad Thompson

== Roster ==
No.		Position	Player
41	(United States)	Def	Barrett, Bryan
66	(United States)	Fwd	Bergey, Jake
32	(United States)	Def	Brzeski, Rich
1	(United States)	Fwd	Christmas, John
11	(Canada)	Def	Clark, Glenn
21	(United States)	Fwd	Cromwell, Keith
22	(United States)	Def	Finck, Dan
19	(United States)	Fwd	Greenhalgh, Sean
28	(United States)	Def	Hajek, Thomas
24	(United States)	Def	Jacobs, Peter
27	(United States)	Fwd	Marohl, Dan
2	(United States)	Goalie	Miller, Erik

No.		Position	Player
17	(United States)	Fwd	Morley, Marc
34	(United States)	Def	Nadelen, Shawn
90	(United States)	Fwd	Ratcliffe, Jeff
12		Fwd	Regan, Mike
5	(Canada)	Def	Robertson, Brock
37	(Canada)	Goalie	Roik, Matt
	(United States)	?	Rosenburger, Ian
23	(Canada)	Fwd	Self, Brad
47	(United States)	Def	Spano, Jeff
7	(United States)	Def	Sweeney, Kyle
	(Canada)	Def	Thompson, Chad
77	(Canada)	Fwd	Van Beek, Rob
	(Canada)	Fwd	Wiles, Luke

== See also ==
- 2006 NLL season
