= 2006 Portland LumberJax season =

2006 Portland LumberJax
- League: NLL
- Division: 1st West
- 2006 record: 11-5
- Home record: 5-3
- Road record: 6-2
- Goals for: 188
- Goals against: 177
- General Manager: Derek Keenan
- Coach: Derek Keenan
- Arena: Rose Garden Arena
- Average attendance: 8,681

Team leaders
- Goals: Mike Hominuck (28)
- Assists: Bruce Alexander (33)
- Points: Peter Morgan (54)
- Penalties in minutes: Ray Guze (44)
- Loose Balls: Brodie Merrill
- Wins: Dallas Eliuk (6)
- Goals against average: Dallas Eliuk (11.09); Matt King (11.09)

The Portland LumberJax were a lacrosse team based in Portland, Oregon playing in the National Lacrosse League (NLL). The 2006 season was the LumberJax inaugural season, and they became the first expansion team in NLL history to win its division. The playoffs were not so kind to the LumberJax however, as they were eliminated in the Western Division semi-finals by the Arizona Sting.

Portland's regular season success was recognized when the NLL handed out its end-of-season awards. Brodie Merrill was named both Rookie of the Year and Defensive Player of the Year, Derek Keenan was named both coach and GM of the year, and owner Angela Batinovich was named Executive of the Year.

== Regular season ==
=== Conference standings ===
East Division
P	Team	GP	W	L	PCT	GB	Home	Road	GF	GA	Diff	GF/GP	GA/GP
1	Buffalo Bandits – xyz	16	11	5	.688	0.0	6–2	5–3	193	167	+26	12.06	10.44
2	Rochester Knighthawks – x	16	9	7	.562	2.0	6–2	3–5	196	180	+16	12.25	11.25
3	Toronto Rock – x	16	8	8	.500	3.0	5–3	3–5	182	179	+3	11.38	11.19
4	Minnesota Swarm – x	16	8	8	.500	3.0	3–5	5–3	158	171	−13	9.88	10.69
5	Philadelphia Wings	16	8	8	.500	3.0	5–3	3–5	184	184	−-0	11.50	11.50

West Division
P	Team	GP	W	L	PCT	GB	Home	Road	GF	GA	Diff	GF/GP	GA/GP
1	Portland LumberJax – xy	16	11	5	.688	0.0	5–3	6–2	188	177	+11	11.75	11.06
2	Colorado Mammoth – x	16	10	6	.625	1.0	6–2	4–4	200	172	+28	12.50	10.75
3	Calgary Roughnecks – x	16	9	7	.562	2.0	4–4	5–3	183	178	+5	11.44	11.12
4	Arizona Sting – x	16	8	8	.500	3.0	4–4	4–4	198	199	−1	12.38	12.44
5	San Jose Stealth	16	5	11	.312	6.0	3–5	2–6	151	174	−23	9.44	10.88
6	Edmonton Rush	16	1	15	.062	10.0	0–8	1–7	150	202	−52	9.38	12.62

x: Clinched playoff berth; c: Clinched playoff berth by crossing over to another division; y: Clinched division; z: Clinched best regular season record; GP: Games Played
W: Wins; L: Losses; GB: Games back; PCT: Win percentage; Home: Record at Home; Road: Record on the Road; GF: Goals scored; GA: Goals allowed
Differential: Difference between goals scored and allowed; GF/GP: Average number of goals scored per game; GA/GP: Average number of goals allowed per game

=== Game log ===
Game	Date	Opponent	Location	Score	OT	Attendance	Record
1	January 13, 2006	@ Arizona Sting	Jobing.com Arena	L 7–12		6,127	0–1
2	January 21, 2006	Colorado Mammoth	Rose Garden	W 12–11		9,916	1–1
3	January 27, 2006	@ San Jose Stealth	HP Pavilion at San Jose	W 15–8		5,457	2–1
4	January 28, 2006	Calgary Roughnecks	Rose Garden	L 8–12		9,633	2–2
5	February 10, 2006	@ Buffalo Bandits	HSBC Arena	L 6–16		10,395	2–3
6	February 18, 2006	@ Philadelphia Wings	Wachovia Center	W 15–12		12,796	3–3
7	March 4, 2006	Rochester Knighthawks	Rose Garden	L 16–18		6,183	3–4
8	March 11, 2006	Arizona Sting	Rose Garden	W 12–10		7,803	4–4
9	March 12, 2006	@ Colorado Mammoth	Pepsi Center	W 12–11		15,247	5–4
10	March 17, 2006	Minnesota Swarm	Rose Garden	L 12–14		5,487	5–5
11	March 25, 2006	San Jose Stealth	Rose Garden	W 11–10		7,938	6–5
12	March 31, 2006	@ Edmonton Rush	Rexall Place	W 15–12		9,613	7–5
13	April 2, 2006	Edmonton Rush	Rose Garden	W 14–10		5,687	8–5
14	April 7, 2006	@ San Jose Stealth	HP Pavilion at San Jose	W 9–6		5,107	9–5
15	April 14, 2006	Edmonton Rush	Rose Garden	W 11–7		11,408	10–5
16	April 15, 2006	@ Minnesota Swarm	Xcel Energy Center	W 13–8		10,104	11–5

== Playoffs ==
=== Game log ===
Game	Date	Opponent	Location	Score	OT	Attendance	Record
Division Semifinal	April 22, 2006	Arizona Sting	Rose Garden	L 11–14		10,843	0–1

== Player stats ==
=== Runners (Top 10) ===
Note: GP = Games played; G = Goals; A = Assists; Pts = Points; LB = Loose Balls; PIM = Penalty minutes

Player	GP	G	A	Pts	LB	PIM
Peter Morgan	16	25	29	54	58	0
Mike Hominuck	15	28	25	53	68	8
Brodie Merrill	16	17	32	49	214	33
Bruce Alexander	15	12	33	45	42	10
Del Halladay	16	18	20	38	66	11
Ryan Powell	13	12	26	38	46	8
Ryan Sharp	16	16	14	30	137	42
Shawn Cable	13	9	16	25	42	15
Richard Morgan	15	10	11	21	75	38
Totals		278	466	378	1062	43

=== Goaltenders ===
Note: GP = Games played; MIN = Minutes; W = Wins; L = Losses; GA = Goals against; Sv% = Save percentage; GAA = Goals against average

Player	GP	MIN	W	L	GA	Sv%	GAA
Dallas Eliuk	13	616:30	6	3	114	.768	11.09
Matt King	12	297:29	3	2	55	.769	11.09
Aaron Bold	7	45:26	2	0	8	.789	10.56
Totals			11	5	177	.769	11.06

== Awards ==
Player	Award
Brodie Merrill	Rookie of the Year
Brodie Merrill	Defensive Player of the Year
Derek Keenan	Les Bartley Award
Derek Keenan	GM of the Year
Angela Batinovich	Executive of the Year
Brodie Merrill	First Team All-Pro
Brodie Merrill	All-Rookie Team
Brodie Merrill	Rookie of the Month, February
Brodie Merrill	Rookie of the Month, March
Brodie Merrill	All-Stars
Dallas Eliuk	All-Stars
Ryan Sharp	All-Stars

== Transactions ==
=== Trades ===
February 2, 2006	To Portland LumberJax Ryder Bateman	To Minnesota Swarm Scott Stewart
March 10, 2006	To Portland LumberJax Ryan Marshall conditional pick, 2006 entry draft	To Calgary Roughnecks Ted Dowling

== Roster ==
No.		Position	Player
49	(Canada)	Def	Alexander, Bruce
14	(Canada)	Fwd	Bateman, Ryder
77	(Canada)	Goalie	Bold, Aaron
20	(Canada)	Def	Bysouth, Adam
11	(Canada)	Fwd	Cable, Shawn
21	(United States)	Def	Davis, Damien
	(Canada)	Fwd	Dowling, Ted
7	(Canada)	Def	Dwane, Matt
35	(Canada)	Goalie	Eliuk, Dallas
36	(Canada)	Def	Forget, Luke
2	(Canada)	Def	Guze, Ray
3	(United States)	Fwd	Halladay, Del

No.		Position	Player
90	(Canada)	Fwd	Hominuck, Mike
12	(Canada)	Def	Jones, Pat
30	(Canada)	Goalie	King, Matt
8	(United States)	Fwd	Marshall, Ryan
9	(Canada)	Def	McKinnon, Brandon
17	(United States)	Def	Merrill, Brodie
63	(United States)	Fwd	Montour, Thomas
55	(Canada)	Def	Morgan, David
44	(Canada)	Fwd	Morgan, Peter
33	(United States)	Def	Morgan, Richard
22	(United States)	Fwd	Powell, Ryan
26	(Canada)	Def	Sharp, Ryan
	(Canada)	Fwd	Stewart, Scott

== See also ==
- 2006 NLL season
