= 2006 Calgary Roughnecks season =

2006 Calgary Roughnecks
- League: NLL
- Division: 3rd West
- 2006 record: 9-7
- Home record: 4-4
- Road record: 5-3
- Goals for: 183
- Goals against: 178
- General Manager: Kurt Silcott
- Coach: Chris Hall
- Captain: Tracey Kelusky
- Arena: Pengrowth Saddledome
- Average attendance: 11,290

Team leaders
- Goals: Lewis Ratcliff (37)
- Assists: Lewis Ratcliff (54)
- Points: Lewis Ratcliff (91)
- Penalties in minutes: Ryan McNish (40); Rob Kirkby (40)
- Loose Balls: Taylor Wray (102)
- Wins: Curtis Palidwor (8)
- Goals against average: Curtis Palidwor (10.69)

The Calgary Roughnecks are a lacrosse team based in Calgary, Alberta playing in the National Lacrosse League (NLL). The 2006 season was the 5th in franchise history.

The Roughnecks finished third in the west but lost to Colorado in the division semi-finals.

== Regular season ==
=== Conference standings ===
East Division
| P | Team | GP | W | L | PCT | GB | Home | Road | GF | GA | Diff | GF/GP | GA/GP |
|---|---|---|---|---|---|---|---|---|---|---|---|---|---|
| 1 | Buffalo Bandits – xyz | 16 | 11 | 5 | .688 | 0.0 | 6–2 | 5–3 | 193 | 167 | +26 | 12.06 | 10.44 |
| 2 | Rochester Knighthawks – x | 16 | 9 | 7 | .562 | 2.0 | 6–2 | 3–5 | 196 | 180 | +16 | 12.25 | 11.25 |
| 3 | Toronto Rock – x | 16 | 8 | 8 | .500 | 3.0 | 5–3 | 3–5 | 182 | 179 | +3 | 11.38 | 11.19 |
| 4 | Minnesota Swarm – x | 16 | 8 | 8 | .500 | 3.0 | 3–5 | 5–3 | 158 | 171 | −13 | 9.88 | 10.69 |
| 5 | Philadelphia Wings | 16 | 8 | 8 | .500 | 3.0 | 5–3 | 3–5 | 184 | 184 | −-0 | 11.50 | 11.50 |

West Division
| P | Team | GP | W | L | PCT | GB | Home | Road | GF | GA | Diff | GF/GP | GA/GP |
|---|---|---|---|---|---|---|---|---|---|---|---|---|---|
| 1 | Portland LumberJax – xy | 16 | 11 | 5 | .688 | 0.0 | 5–3 | 6–2 | 188 | 177 | +11 | 11.75 | 11.06 |
| 2 | Colorado Mammoth – x | 16 | 10 | 6 | .625 | 1.0 | 6–2 | 4–4 | 200 | 172 | +28 | 12.50 | 10.75 |
| 3 | Calgary Roughnecks – x | 16 | 9 | 7 | .562 | 2.0 | 4–4 | 5–3 | 183 | 178 | +5 | 11.44 | 11.12 |
| 4 | Arizona Sting – x | 16 | 8 | 8 | .500 | 3.0 | 4–4 | 4–4 | 198 | 199 | −1 | 12.38 | 12.44 |
| 5 | San Jose Stealth | 16 | 5 | 11 | .312 | 6.0 | 3–5 | 2–6 | 151 | 174 | −23 | 9.44 | 10.88 |
| 6 | Edmonton Rush | 16 | 1 | 15 | .062 | 10.0 | 0–8 | 1–7 | 150 | 202 | −52 | 9.38 | 12.62 |

x: Clinched playoff berth; c: Clinched playoff berth by crossing over to another division; y: Clinched division; z: Clinched best regular season record; GP: Games Played
W: Wins; L: Losses; GB: Games back; PCT: Win percentage; Home: Record at Home; Road: Record on the Road; GF: Goals scored; GA: Goals allowed
Differential: Difference between goals scored and allowed; GF/GP: Average number of goals scored per game; GA/GP: Average number of goals allowed per game

=== Game log ===
| Game | Date | Opponent | Location | Score | OT | Attendance | Record |
|---|---|---|---|---|---|---|---|
| 1 | January 13, 2006 | Edmonton Rush | Pengrowth Saddledome | W 11–9 | | 13,335 | 1–0 |
| 2 | January 20, 2006 | Minnesota Swarm | Pengrowth Saddledome | L 8–12 | | 10,637 | 1–1 |
| 3 | January 21, 2006 | @ Edmonton Rush | Rexall Place | W 12–9 | | 11,676 | 2–1 |
| 4 | January 27, 2006 | @ Arizona Sting | Jobing.com Arena | L 10–11 | OT | 6,326 | 2–2 |
| 5 | January 28, 2006 | @ Portland LumberJax | Rose Garden | W 12–8 | | 9,633 | 3–2 |
| 6 | February 5, 2006 | Toronto Rock | Pengrowth Saddledome | L 10–14 | | 9,911 | 3–3 |
| 7 | February 17, 2006 | Edmonton Rush | Pengrowth Saddledome | L 11–12 | | 12,025 | 3–4 |
| 8 | February 18, 2006 | @ Arizona Sting | Jobing.com Arena | W 13–7 | | 6,535 | 4–4 |
| 9 | March 11, 2006 | Colorado Mammoth | Pengrowth Saddledome | W 15–14 | OT | 12,028 | 5–4 |
| 10 | March 17, 2006 | @ Edmonton Rush | Rexall Place | W 16–9 | | 11,289 | 6–4 |
| 11 | March 18, 2006 | @ San Jose Stealth | HP Pavilion at San Jose | L 13–14 | OT | 5,338 | 6–5 |
| 12 | March 25, 2006 | @ Toronto Rock | Air Canada Centre | W 11–9 | | 17,942 | 7–5 |
| 13 | April 1, 2006 | San Jose Stealth | Pengrowth Saddledome | W 12–10 | | 12,224 | 8–5 |
| 14 | April 8, 2006 | Arizona Sting | Pengrowth Saddledome | W 14–12 | | 12,173 | 9–5 |
| 15 | April 14, 2006 | @ Colorado Mammoth | Pepsi Center | L 8–11 | | 17,698 | 9–6 |
| 16 | April 15, 2006 | Colorado Mammoth | Pengrowth Saddledome | L 7–17 | | 11,884 | 9–7 |

== Playoffs ==
=== Game log ===
| Game | Date | Opponent | Location | Score | OT | Attendance | Record |
|---|---|---|---|---|---|---|---|
| Division Semifinal | April 22, 2006 | @ Colorado Mammoth | Pepsi Center | L 17–18 | OT | 13,426 | 0–1 |

== Player stats ==
=== Runners (Top 10) ===
Note: GP = Games played; G = Goals; A = Assists; Pts = Points; LB = Loose Balls; PIM = Penalty minutes

| Player | GP | G | A | Pts | LB | PIM |
|---|---|---|---|---|---|---|
| Lewis Ratcliff | 16 | 37 | 54 | 91 | 94 | 4 |
| Tracey Kelusky | 16 | 35 | 34 | 69 | 75 | 17 |
| Kaleb Toth | 16 | 22 | 33 | 55 | 69 | 27 |
| Jason Wulder | 16 | 24 | 24 | 48 | 87 | 13 |
| Kyle Goundrey | 16 | 14 | 34 | 48 | 59 | 6 |
| Kevin Dostie | 14 | 18 | 20 | 38 | 72 | 13 |
| Taylor Wray | 14 | 6 | 16 | 22 | 102 | 33 |
| Grant Hamilton | 14 | 4 | 10 | 14 | 74 | 12 |
| Travis Gillespie | 9 | 4 | 7 | 11 | 48 | 13 |
| Totals | | 291 | 474 | 362 | 1111 | 38 |

=== Goaltenders ===
Note: GP = Games played; MIN = Minutes; W = Wins; L = Losses; GA = Goals against; Sv% = Save percentage; GAA = Goals against average

| Player | GP | MIN | W | L | GA | Sv% | GAA |
|---|---|---|---|---|---|---|---|
| Curtis Palidwor | 16 | 819:15 | 8 | 5 | 146 | .791 | 10.69 |
| Andrew Leyshon | 14 | 147:02 | 1 | 2 | 31 | .735 | 12.65 |
| Ryan Avery | 2 | 1:24 | 0 | 0 | 0 | 1.000 | .00 |
| Totals | | | 9 | 7 | 178 | .783 | 11.13 |

== Awards ==
| Player | Award |
|---|---|
| Lewis Ratcliff | Second Team All-Pro |
| Tracey Kelusky | All-Stars |
| Lewis Ratcliff | All-Stars |
| Kaleb Toth | All-Stars |
| Andrew Turner | All-Stars |

== Transactions ==
=== Trades ===
| March 14, 2006 | To Calgary Roughnecks second round pick, 2006 entry draft third round pick, 2006 entry draft | To Minnesota Swarm Andrew Biers |
| March 10, 2006 | To Calgary Roughnecks Ted Dowling | To Portland LumberJax Ryan Marshall conditional pick, 2006 entry draft |
| February 21, 2006 | To Calgary Roughnecks Ryan Avery | To Buffalo Bandits first round pick, 2006 entry draft |

== Roster ==
| No. | | Position | Player |
|---|---|---|---|
| 30 | (Canada) | Goalie | Avery, Ryan |
| | (Canada) | Fwd | Biers, Andrew |
| 72 | (Canada) | Fwd | Jeremy Cheyne |
| 23 | (Canada) | Fwd | Crawford, Callum |
| 51 | (Canada) | Fwd | Dostie, Kevin |
| | (Canada) | Fwd | Dowling, Ted |
| 26 | (Canada) | Def | Gelsvik, Craig |
| | (Canada) | Def | Gillespie, Travis |
| 19 | (Canada) | Fwd | Goundrey, Kyle |
| 8 | (Canada) | Fwd | Green, Matt |
| 29 | (Canada) | Def | Hamilton, Grant |
| 17 | (Canada) | Fwd | Kelusky, Tracey |
| 15 | (Canada) | Def | Kirkby, Rob |
| 41 | (Canada) | Goalie | Leyshon, Andrew |

| No. | | Position | Player |
|---|---|---|---|
| | (United States) | Def | Marshall, Ryan |
| 37 | (Canada) | Def | McBride, Andrew |
| 11 | (Canada) | Def | McNish, Ryan |
| 14 | (Canada) | Def | Moleski, Jeff |
| 20 | (Canada) | Def | Ogilvie, Andy |
| 0 | (Canada) | Goalie | Palidwor, Curtis |
| 74 | (Canada) | Def | Phillips, Jesse |
| 42 | (Canada) | Fwd | Ratcliff, Lewis |
| | (Canada) | ? | Rooney, Jamie |
| 9 | (Canada) | Fwd | Toth, Kaleb |
| | (Canada) | Def | Williams, Rob |
| 4 | (Canada) | Def | Wray, Devan |
| 44 | (Canada) | Def | Wray, Taylor |
| 22 | (Canada) | Fwd | Wulder, Jason |

== See also ==
- 2006 NLL season
