= 2006 San Jose Stealth season =

Lacrosse team season

2006 San Jose Stealth
- League: NLL
- Division: 5th West
- 2006 record: 5-11
- Home record: 3-5
- Road record: 2-6
- Goals for: 151
- Goals against: 174
- General Manager: Johnny Mouradian
- Arena: HP Pavilion at San Jose
- Average attendance: 5,609

Team leaders
- Goals: Jeff Zywicki (27)
- Assists: Derek Malawsky (30)
- Points: Derek Malawsky (50)
- Penalties in minutes: Eric Martin (37)
- Loose Balls: Eric Martin (112)
- Wins: Anthony Cosmo (5)
- Goals against average: Anthony Cosmo (10.38)

The San Jose Stealth are a lacrosse team based in San Jose playing in the National Lacrosse League (NLL). The 2006 season was the 7th in franchise history and 3rd as the Stealth (previously the Albany Attack).

The 2006 Stealth looked to rebound from the dismal 4-12 2005 season. But after starting the season 5-4, they lost their last seven games to finish 5-11.

== Regular season ==
=== Conference standings ===
East Division
P	Team	GP	W	L	PCT	GB	Home	Road	GF	GA	Diff	GF/GP	GA/GP
1	Buffalo Bandits – xyz	16	11	5	.688	0.0	6–2	5–3	193	167	+26	12.06	10.44
2	Rochester Knighthawks – x	16	9	7	.562	2.0	6–2	3–5	196	180	+16	12.25	11.25
3	Toronto Rock – x	16	8	8	.500	3.0	5–3	3–5	182	179	+3	11.38	11.19
4	Minnesota Swarm – x	16	8	8	.500	3.0	3–5	5–3	158	171	−13	9.88	10.69
5	Philadelphia Wings	16	8	8	.500	3.0	5–3	3–5	184	184	−-0	11.50	11.50

West Division
P	Team	GP	W	L	PCT	GB	Home	Road	GF	GA	Diff	GF/GP	GA/GP
1	Portland LumberJax – xy	16	11	5	.688	0.0	5–3	6–2	188	177	+11	11.75	11.06
2	Colorado Mammoth – x	16	10	6	.625	1.0	6–2	4–4	200	172	+28	12.50	10.75
3	Calgary Roughnecks – x	16	9	7	.562	2.0	4–4	5–3	183	178	+5	11.44	11.12
4	Arizona Sting – x	16	8	8	.500	3.0	4–4	4–4	198	199	−1	12.38	12.44
5	San Jose Stealth	16	5	11	.312	6.0	3–5	2–6	151	174	−23	9.44	10.88
6	Edmonton Rush	16	1	15	.062	10.0	0–8	1–7	150	202	−52	9.38	12.62

x: Clinched playoff berth; c: Clinched playoff berth by crossing over to another division; y: Clinched division; z: Clinched best regular season record; GP: Games Played
W: Wins; L: Losses; GB: Games back; PCT: Win percentage; Home: Record at Home; Road: Record on the Road; GF: Goals scored; GA: Goals allowed
Differential: Difference between goals scored and allowed; GF/GP: Average number of goals scored per game; GA/GP: Average number of goals allowed per game

=== Game log ===
Game	Date	Opponent	Location	Score	OT	Attendance	Record
1	January 6, 2006	@ Edmonton Rush	Rexall Place	W 10–9	OT	11,385	1–0
2	January 13, 2006	@ Colorado Mammoth	Pepsi Center	L 7–9		15,632	1–1
3	January 14, 2006	Colorado Mammoth	HP Pavilion at San Jose	W 10–7		6,277	2–1
4	January 21, 2006	Philadelphia Wings	HP Pavilion at San Jose	L 7–10		5,217	2–2
5	January 27, 2006	Portland LumberJax	HP Pavilion at San Jose	L 8–15		5,457	2–3
6	February 11, 2006	@ Colorado Mammoth	Pepsi Center	L 7–8		18,027	2–4
7	February 18, 2006	@ Rochester Knighthawks	Blue Cross Arena	W 13–12		9,731	3–4
8	March 11, 2006	Edmonton Rush	HP Pavilion at San Jose	W 12–11		6,141	4–4
9	March 18, 2006	Calgary Roughnecks	HP Pavilion at San Jose	W 14–13	OT	5,338	5–4
10	March 25, 2006	@ Portland LumberJax	Rose Garden	L 10–11		7,938	5–5
11	March 31, 2006	Buffalo Bandits	HP Pavilion at San Jose	L 9–11		5,143	5–6
12	April 1, 2006	@ Calgary Roughnecks	Pengrowth Saddledome	L 10–12		12,224	5–7
13	April 7, 2006	Portland LumberJax	HP Pavilion at San Jose	L 6–9		5,107	5–8
14	April 9, 2006	@ Minnesota Swarm	Xcel Energy Center	L 8–9	OT	7,044	5–9
15	April 14, 2006	@ Arizona Sting	Jobing.com Arena	L 13–16		6,575	5–10
16	April 15, 2006	Arizona Sting	HP Pavilion at San Jose	L 7–12		6,188	5–11

== Player stats ==
=== Runners (Top 10) ===
Note: GP = Games played; G = Goals; A = Assists; Pts = Points; LB = Loose Balls; PIM = Penalty minutes

Player	GP	G	A	Pts	LB	PIM
Derek Malawsky	16	20	30	50	73	28
Jeff Zywicki	16	27	21	48	77	4
Ryan Boyle	16	16	28	44	46	4
Gary Rosyski	15	14	29	43	48	15
Cam Sedgwick	16	13	23	36	50	14
Kevin Fines	15	15	12	27	31	19
Luke Wiles	9	13	13	26	37	4
Jarett Park	10	6	6	12	41	2
Cam Woods	16	2	10	12	94	20
Totals		223	374	298	1029	33

=== Goaltenders ===
Note: GP = Games played; MIN = Minutes; W = Wins; L = Losses; GA = Goals against; Sv% = Save percentage; GAA = Goals against average

Player	GP	MIN	W	L	GA	Sv%	GAA
Anthony Cosmo	14	688:05	5	7	119	.779	10.38
Brandon Miller	14	256:51	0	4	49	.754	11.45
Matt Vinc	4	14:14	0	0	4	.556	16.86
Totals			5	11	174	.768	10.88

== Awards ==
Player	Award
Jeff Zywicki	All-Rookie Team
Luke Wiles	All-Rookie Team
Anthony Cosmo	All-Stars
Derek Malawsky	All-Stars

== Transactions ==
=== Trades ===
March 10, 2006	To San Jose Stealth Luke Wiles; Chad Thompson	To Philadelphia Wings Mike Regan first round pick, 2006 entry draft

== Roster ==
No.		Position	Player
3	(United States)	Fwd	Alrich, Matt
14	(United States)	Fwd	Boyle, Ryan
44	(Canada)	Goalie	Cosmo, Anthony
27	(Canada)	Fwd	Fines, Kevin
36		Fwd	Frick, Tony
88	(United States)	Def	Hawksbee, Ian
6	(Canada)	Fwd	Hodgson, Curtis
17	(United States)	Def	Johnson, Ross
	(Canada)	Fwd	Malawsky, Curt
18	(Canada)	Fwd	Malawsky, Derek
	(Canada)	Def	Martin, Andrew
25	(United States)	Def	Martin, Eric
	(United States)	Fwd	Martin, Spencer

No.		Position	Player
35	(Canada)	Goalie	Miller, Brandon
55	(Canada)	Def	Moss, Jim
24	(United States)	Fwd	Neufeld, Kyle
12	(United States)	Def	Park, Jarett
32	(Canada)	Def	Reisig, Darren
23	(Canada)	Fwd	Rosyski, Gary
20	(Canada)	Def	Santos, Shaydon
29	(Canada)	Fwd	Sedgwick, Cam
21	(Canada)	Def	Thompson, Chad
48	(United States)	Goalie	Vinc, Matt
		Def	Virk, Drew
15	(Canada)	Fwd	Wiles, Luke
22	(Canada)	Def	Woods, Cam
9	(Canada)	Fwd	Zywicki, Jeff

== See also ==
- 2006 NLL season
