= 2006 Toronto Rock season =

2006 Toronto Rock
- League: NLL
- Division: 3rd East
- 2006 record: 8–8
- Home record: 5–3
- Road record: 3–5
- Goals for: 182
- Goals against: 179
- General Manager: Terry Sanderson
- Coach: Terry Sanderson
- Captain: Jim Veltman
- Alternate captains: Blaine Manning; Chris Driscoll
- Arena: Air Canada Centre
- Average attendance: 16,538

Team leaders
- Goals: Colin Doyle (43)
- Assists: Josh Sanderson (69)
- Points: Josh Sanderson (98)
- Penalties in minutes: Patrick Merrill (45); Dan Ladouceur (45)
- Loose Balls: Jim Veltman (226)
- Wins: Bob Watson (8)
- Goals against average: Bob Watson (11.21)

The Toronto Rock are a lacrosse team based in Toronto playing in the National Lacrosse League (NLL). The 2006 season was the 9th in franchise history, and 8th as the Rock (they played one season as the Ontario Raiders). The Rock won the Championship in the 2005 season, but followed it up with a mediocre 8-8 record and an early exit from the playoffs at the hands of the Rochester Knighthawks.

== Regular season ==
=== Conference standings ===
East Division
P	Team	GP	W	L	PCT	GB	Home	Road	GF	GA	Diff	GF/GP	GA/GP
1	Buffalo Bandits – xyz	16	11	5	.688	0.0	6–2	5–3	193	167	+26	12.06	10.44
2	Rochester Knighthawks – x	16	9	7	.562	2.0	6–2	3–5	196	180	+16	12.25	11.25
3	Toronto Rock – x	16	8	8	.500	3.0	5–3	3–5	182	179	+3	11.38	11.19
4	Minnesota Swarm – x	16	8	8	.500	3.0	3–5	5–3	158	171	−13	9.88	10.69
5	Philadelphia Wings	16	8	8	.500	3.0	5–3	3–5	184	184	−-0	11.50	11.50

West Division
P	Team	GP	W	L	PCT	GB	Home	Road	GF	GA	Diff	GF/GP	GA/GP
1	Portland LumberJax – xy	16	11	5	.688	0.0	5–3	6–2	188	177	+11	11.75	11.06
2	Colorado Mammoth – x	16	10	6	.625	1.0	6–2	4–4	200	172	+28	12.50	10.75
3	Calgary Roughnecks – x	16	9	7	.562	2.0	4–4	5–3	183	178	+5	11.44	11.12
4	Arizona Sting – x	16	8	8	.500	3.0	4–4	4–4	198	199	−1	12.38	12.44
5	San Jose Stealth	16	5	11	.312	6.0	3–5	2–6	151	174	−23	9.44	10.88
6	Edmonton Rush	16	1	15	.062	10.0	0–8	1–7	150	202	−52	9.38	12.62

x: Clinched playoff berth; c: Clinched playoff berth by crossing over to another division; y: Clinched division; z: Clinched best regular season record; GP: Games Played
W: Wins; L: Losses; GB: Games back; PCT: Win percentage; Home: Record at Home; Road: Record on the Road; GF: Goals scored; GA: Goals allowed
Differential: Difference between goals scored and allowed; GF/GP: Average number of goals scored per game; GA/GP: Average number of goals allowed per game

=== Game log ===
Game	Date	Opponent	Location	Score	OT	Attendance	Record
1	January 7, 2006	Arizona Sting	Air Canada Centre	L 13–14	OT	17,527	0–1
2	January 13, 2006	Buffalo Bandits	Air Canada Centre	L 11–13		15,104	0–2
3	January 14, 2006	@ Rochester Knighthawks	Blue Cross Arena	L 9–14		10,156	0–3
4	January 21, 2006	@ Buffalo Bandits	HSBC Arena	L 10–13		13,072	0–4
5	January 27, 2006	Edmonton Rush	Air Canada Centre	W 14–8		15,104	1–4
6	February 5, 2006	@ Calgary Roughnecks	Pengrowth Saddledome	W 14–10		9,911	2–4
7	February 10, 2006	Rochester Knighthawks	Air Canada Centre	W 11–10	OT	16,235	3–4
8	February 11, 2006	@ Edmonton Rush	Rexall Place	W 13–11		11,019	4–4
9	February 24, 2006	Philadelphia Wings	Air Canada Centre	W 12–11	OT	16,164	5–4
10	March 3, 2006	Minnesota Swarm	Air Canada Centre	W 13–8		15,830	6–4
11	March 4, 2006	@ Philadelphia Wings	Wachovia Center	L 12–14		12,165	6–5
12	March 11, 2006	@ Buffalo Bandits	HSBC Arena	W 10–8		14,064	7–5
13	March 25, 2006	Calgary Roughnecks	Air Canada Centre	L 9–11		17,942	7–6
14	April 1, 2006	@ Minnesota Swarm	Xcel Energy Center	L 9–10		10,084	7–7
15	April 8, 2006	Philadelphia Wings	Air Canada Centre	W 15–14	OT	18,400	8–7
16	April 15, 2006	@ Rochester Knighthawks	Blue Cross Arena	L 7–10		9,899	8–8

== Playoffs ==
=== Game log ===
Game	Date	Opponent	Location	Score	OT	Attendance	Record
Division Semifinal	April 22, 2006	@ Rochester Knighthawks	Blue Cross Arena	L 8–16		7,295	0–1

== Player stats ==
=== Runners (Top 10) ===
Note: GP = Games played; G = Goals; A = Assists; Pts = Points; LB = Loose Balls; PIM = Penalty minutes

Player	GP	G	A	Pts	LB	PIM
Josh Sanderson	16	29	69	98	92	6
Colin Doyle	16	43	53	96	67	4
Blaine Manning	16	28	52	80	79	19
Aaron Wilson	16	39	21	60	98	15
Jim Veltman	16	6	36	42	226	32
Matt Shearer	9	11	10	21	24	0
Rusty Kruger	11	7	13	20	38	28
Chris Driscoll	13	5	10	15	40	10
Brian Beisel	15	3	12	15	64	6
Totals		319	501	387	1111	49

=== Goaltenders ===
Note: GP = Games played; MIN = Minutes; W = Wins; L = Losses; GA = Goals against; Sv% = Save percentage; GAA = Goals against average

Player	GP	MIN	W	L	GA	Sv%	GAA
Bob Watson	16	909:36	8	8	170	.772	11.21
Phil Wetherup	16	48:31	0	0	6	.769	7.42
Totals			8	8	179	.769	11.19

== Awards ==
Player	Award
Colin Doyle	First Team All-Pro
Colin Doyle	All-Stars
Blaine Manning	All-Stars
Josh Sanderson	All-Stars
Phil Sanderson	All-Stars
Jim Veltman	All-Stars

== Transactions ==
=== Trades ===
February 8, 2006	To Toronto Rock second round pick, 2006 entry draft	To Edmonton Rush Mat Giles
March 14, 2006	To Minnesota Swarm first round pick, 2008 entry draft second round pick, 2006 entry draft	To Toronto Rock Darryl Gibson second round pick, 2007 entry draft

== Roster ==
No.		Position	Player
17	(Canada)	Def	Brian Beisel
37	(Canada)	Def	Scott Campbell
25	(Canada)	Fwd	J.J Dickie
7	(Canada)	Fwd	Colin Doyle
93	(Canada)	Fwd	Chris Driscoll
15		Fwd	Steve Evans
	(Canada)	Def	Darryl Gibson
	(Canada)	Fwd	Mat Giles
		?	Jason Henhawk
20	(Canada)	Fwd	Rusty Kruger
6	(Canada)	Def	Dan Ladouceur
28	(Canada)	Def	Brad MacDonald
16	(Canada)	Fwd	Blaine Manning

No.		Position	Player
14	(Canada)	Def	Rob Marshall
9	(Canada)	Def	Patrick Merrill
77	(Canada)	Def	Tim OBrien
40	(Canada)	Def	Ian Rubel
19	(Canada)	Fwd	Josh Sanderson
18	(Canada)	Def	Phil Sanderson
24	(Canada)	Fwd	Matt Shearer
27	(Canada)	Def	Derek Suddons
22	(United States)	Fwd	Matt Taylor
32	(Canada)	Fwd	Jim Veltman
29	(Canada)	Goalie	Bob Watson
90	(Canada)	Goalie	Phil Wetherup
10	(Canada)	Fwd	Aaron Wilson

== See also ==
- 2006 NLL season
