= 2006 Colorado Mammoth season =

2006 Colorado Mammoth
- Champion's Cup Champions
- League: NLL
- Division: 2nd West
- 2006 record: 10-6
- Home record: 6-2
- Road record: 4-4
- Goals for: 200
- Goals against: 172
- General Manager: Steve Govett
- Coach: Gary Gait
- Captain: Gavin Prout
- Arena: Pepsi Center
- Average attendance: 12,916

Team leaders
- Goals: Gavin Prout (29); Chris Gill (29)
- Assists: Gavin Prout (64)
- Points: Gavin Prout (93)
- Penalties in minutes: Dave Stilley (64)
- Loose Balls: Jay Jalbert (152)
- Wins: Gee Nash (6)
- Goals against average: Gee Nash (10.29)

The Colorado Mammoth are a lacrosse team based in Denver, Colorado playing in the National Lacrosse League (NLL). The 2006 season was the 20th in franchise history and 4th as the Mammoth.

The Mammoth finished 2nd in the West with a 10-6 record, but beat both Calgary and Arizona in one-goal games to make it to the Championship game against the Buffalo Bandits. The Bandits, however, were no match for the Mammoth, who took the game 16-9, making lacrosse legend Gary Gait an NLL champion in his first season as head coach.

== Regular season ==
=== Conference standings ===
East Division
| P | Team | GP | W | L | PCT | GB | Home | Road | GF | GA | Diff | GF/GP | GA/GP |
|---|---|---|---|---|---|---|---|---|---|---|---|---|---|
| 1 | Buffalo Bandits – xyz | 16 | 11 | 5 | .688 | 0.0 | 6–2 | 5–3 | 193 | 167 | +26 | 12.06 | 10.44 |
| 2 | Rochester Knighthawks – x | 16 | 9 | 7 | .562 | 2.0 | 6–2 | 3–5 | 196 | 180 | +16 | 12.25 | 11.25 |
| 3 | Toronto Rock – x | 16 | 8 | 8 | .500 | 3.0 | 5–3 | 3–5 | 182 | 179 | +3 | 11.38 | 11.19 |
| 4 | Minnesota Swarm – x | 16 | 8 | 8 | .500 | 3.0 | 3–5 | 5–3 | 158 | 171 | −13 | 9.88 | 10.69 |
| 5 | Philadelphia Wings | 16 | 8 | 8 | .500 | 3.0 | 5–3 | 3–5 | 184 | 184 | −-0 | 11.50 | 11.50 |

West Division
| P | Team | GP | W | L | PCT | GB | Home | Road | GF | GA | Diff | GF/GP | GA/GP |
|---|---|---|---|---|---|---|---|---|---|---|---|---|---|
| 1 | Portland LumberJax – xy | 16 | 11 | 5 | .688 | 0.0 | 5–3 | 6–2 | 188 | 177 | +11 | 11.75 | 11.06 |
| 2 | Colorado Mammoth – x | 16 | 10 | 6 | .625 | 1.0 | 6–2 | 4–4 | 200 | 172 | +28 | 12.50 | 10.75 |
| 3 | Calgary Roughnecks – x | 16 | 9 | 7 | .562 | 2.0 | 4–4 | 5–3 | 183 | 178 | +5 | 11.44 | 11.12 |
| 4 | Arizona Sting – x | 16 | 8 | 8 | .500 | 3.0 | 4–4 | 4–4 | 198 | 199 | −1 | 12.38 | 12.44 |
| 5 | San Jose Stealth | 16 | 5 | 11 | .312 | 6.0 | 3–5 | 2–6 | 151 | 174 | −23 | 9.44 | 10.88 |
| 6 | Edmonton Rush | 16 | 1 | 15 | .062 | 10.0 | 0–8 | 1–7 | 150 | 202 | −52 | 9.38 | 12.62 |

x: Clinched playoff berth; c: Clinched playoff berth by crossing over to another division; y: Clinched division; z: Clinched best regular season record; GP: Games Played
W: Wins; L: Losses; GB: Games back; PCT: Win percentage; Home: Record at Home; Road: Record on the Road; GF: Goals scored; GA: Goals allowed
Differential: Difference between goals scored and allowed; GF/GP: Average number of goals scored per game; GA/GP: Average number of goals allowed per game

=== Game log ===
| Game | Date | Opponent | Location | Score | OT | Attendance | Record |
|---|---|---|---|---|---|---|---|
| 1 | December 30, 2005 | Philadelphia Wings | Pepsi Center | L 11–13 | | 15,726 | 0–1 |
| 2 | January 7, 2006 | Rochester Knighthawks | Pepsi Center | W 12–11 | | 16,850 | 1–1 |
| 3 | January 13, 2006 | San Jose Stealth | Pepsi Center | W 9–7 | | 15,632 | 2–1 |
| 4 | January 14, 2006 | @ San Jose Stealth | HP Pavilion at San Jose | L 7–10 | | 6,277 | 2–2 |
| 5 | January 21, 2006 | @ Portland LumberJax | Rose Garden | L 11–12 | | 9,916 | 2–3 |
| 6 | February 3, 2006 | @ Arizona Sting | Jobing.com Arena | W 18–17 | OT | 6,373 | 3–3 |
| 7 | February 11, 2006 | San Jose Stealth | Pepsi Center | W 8–7 | | 18,027 | 4–3 |
| 8 | March 3, 2006 | Edmonton Rush | Pepsi Center | W 15–10 | | 16,732 | 5–3 |
| 9 | March 11, 2006 | @ Calgary Roughnecks | Pengrowth Saddledome | L 14–15 | OT | 12,028 | 5–4 |
| 10 | March 12, 2006 | Portland LumberJax | Pepsi Center | L 11–12 | | 15,247 | 5–5 |
| 11 | March 18, 2006 | @ Arizona Sting | Jobing.com Arena | W 15–11 | | 6,420 | 6–5 |
| 12 | March 25, 2006 | @ Edmonton Rush | Rexall Place | W 13–7 | | 9,527 | 7–5 |
| 13 | April 2, 2006 | Arizona Sting | Pepsi Center | W 16–11 | | 16,435 | 8–5 |
| 14 | April 8, 2006 | @ Buffalo Bandits | HSBC Arena | L 12–14 | | 11,895 | 8–6 |
| 15 | April 14, 2006 | Calgary Roughnecks | Pepsi Center | W 11–8 | | 17,698 | 9–6 |
| 16 | April 15, 2006 | @ Calgary Roughnecks | Pengrowth Saddledome | W 17–7 | | 11,884 | 10–6 |

== Playoffs ==
=== Game log ===
| Game | Date | Opponent | Location | Score | OT | Attendance | Record |
|---|---|---|---|---|---|---|---|
| Division Semifinal | April 22, 2006 | Calgary Roughnecks | Pepsi Center | W 18–17 | OT | 13,426 | 1–0 |
| Division Final | April 29, 2006 | Arizona Sting | Pepsi Center | W 13–12 | | 12,537 | 2–0 |
| Championship Game | May 13, 2006 | @ Buffalo Bandits | HSBC Arena | W 16–9 | | 16,104 | 3–0 |

== Player stats ==
=== Runners (Top 10) ===
Note: GP = Games played; G = Goals; A = Assists; Pts = Points; LB = Loose Balls; PIM = Penalty minutes

| Player | GP | G | A | Pts | LB | PIM |
|---|---|---|---|---|---|---|
| Gavin Prout | 16 | 29 | 64 | 93 | 89 | 42 |
| Dan Carey | 16 | 17 | 45 | 62 | 80 | 2 |
| Brian Langtry | 15 | 24 | 26 | 50 | 72 | 9 |
| Jay Jalbert | 16 | 19 | 29 | 48 | 152 | 55 |
| Chris Gill | 16 | 29 | 16 | 45 | 55 | 6 |
| Dan Stroup | 15 | 22 | 12 | 34 | 52 | 2 |
| Ben Prepchuk | 15 | 12 | 19 | 31 | 38 | 10 |
| Nick Carlson | 16 | 14 | 15 | 29 | 56 | 51 |
| Josh Sims | 16 | 12 | 7 | 19 | 104 | 26 |
| Totals | | 288 | 488 | 409 | 1099 | 69 |

=== Goaltenders ===
Note: GP = Games played; MIN = Minutes; W = Wins; L = Losses; GA = Goals against; Sv% = Save percentage; GAA = Goals against average

| Player | GP | MIN | W | L | GA | Sv% | GAA |
|---|---|---|---|---|---|---|---|
| Gee Nash | 15 | 670:51 | 6 | 3 | 115 | .787 | 10.29 |
| Chris Levis | 16 | 292:55 | 4 | 3 | 56 | .788 | 11.47 |
| John McLellan | 2 | 0:00 | 0 | 0 | 0 | .000 | .00 |
| Totals | | | 10 | 6 | 172 | .786 | 10.75 |

== Awards ==
| Player | Award |
|---|---|
| Gavin Prout | Championship Game MVP |
| Gavin Prout | First Team All-Pro |
| Jay Jalbert | Second Team All-Pro |
| Dan Carey | All-Rookie Team |
| Gavin Prout | Overall Player of the Month, March |
| Gavin Prout | All-Stars |
| Jay Jalbert | All-Stars |
| Dan Carey | All-Stars |

== Transactions ==
=== Trades ===
| March 14, 2006 | To Colorado Mammoth Andrew Burkholder | To Rochester Knighthawks third round pick, 2006 entry draft |

== Roster ==
| No. | | Position | Player |
|---|---|---|---|
| 37 | (Canada) | Fwd | Burkholder, Andrew |
| 44 | (United States) | Fwd | Carey, Dan |
| 8 | (Canada) | Fwd | Carlson, Nick |
| 48 | (Canada) | Def | Catton, Rich |
| 2 | (United States) | Def | Coyle, Pat |
| 28 | (United States) | Def | Ethington, Tom |
| 11 | (Canada) | Def | Gallant, John |
| 25 | (Canada) | Fwd | Gill, Chris |
| 14 | (Canada) | Def | Glen, Andy |
| 5 | (United States) | Def | Hanford, Jamie |
| 10 | (United States) | Def | Jalbert, Jay |
| 6 | (United States) | Fwd | Langtry, Brian |

| No. | | Position | Player |
|---|---|---|---|
| 3 | (United States) | Fwd | Law, Mike |
| 66 | (Canada) | Def | Leveque, Matt |
| 30 | (Canada) | Goalie | Levis, Chris |
| 29 | (Canada) | Goalie | McLellan, John |
| 38 | (Canada) | Goalie | Nash, Gee |
| 19 | (Canada) | Fwd | Prepchuk, Ben |
| 9 | (United States) | Fwd | Prout, Gavin |
| | (Haudenosaunee) | Fwd | Schindler, Gewas |
| 4 | (United States) | Fwd | Sims, Josh |
| 20 | (Canada) | Def | Stapleford, Scott |
| 77 | (United States) | Def | Stilley, Dave |
| 88 | (Canada) | Fwd | Stroup, Dan |
| | (Canada) | Fwd | Voituk, Steve |

== See also ==
- 2006 NLL season
