= 2006 Edmonton Rush season =

Lacrosse team season

2006 Edmonton Rush
- League: NLL
- Division: 6th West
- 2006 record: 1-15
- Home record: 0-8
- Road record: 1-7
- Goals for: 150
- Goals against: 202
- General Manager: Paul Day
- Coach: Paul Day
- Captain: Andrew Turner
- Arena: Rexall Place
- Average attendance: 10,367

Team leaders
- Goals: Kevin Howard (21)
- Assists: Jamey Bowen (24)
- Points: Jamey Bowen (43)
- Penalties in minutes: Trent Smalley (64)
- Loose Balls: Andrew Turner (95)
- Wins: Pat Campbell (1)
- Goals against average: Dwight Maetche (11.54)

The Edmonton Rush are a lacrosse team based in Edmonton, Alberta playing in the National Lacrosse League (NLL). The 2006 season was the Rush's inaugural season.

After starting the season 0-6, the Rush finally won their first-ever game, beating their provincial rivals the Calgary Roughnecks in Calgary. That was the high point of the season for the Rush, who didn't win again until the 2007 season.

== Regular season ==
=== Conference standings ===
East Division
P	Team	GP	W	L	PCT	GB	Home	Road	GF	GA	Diff	GF/GP	GA/GP
1	Buffalo Bandits – xyz	16	11	5	.688	0.0	6–2	5–3	193	167	+26	12.06	10.44
2	Rochester Knighthawks – x	16	9	7	.562	2.0	6–2	3–5	196	180	+16	12.25	11.25
3	Toronto Rock – x	16	8	8	.500	3.0	5–3	3–5	182	179	+3	11.38	11.19
4	Minnesota Swarm – x	16	8	8	.500	3.0	3–5	5–3	158	171	−13	9.88	10.69
5	Philadelphia Wings	16	8	8	.500	3.0	5–3	3–5	184	184	−-0	11.50	11.50

West Division
P	Team	GP	W	L	PCT	GB	Home	Road	GF	GA	Diff	GF/GP	GA/GP
1	Portland LumberJax – xy	16	11	5	.688	0.0	5–3	6–2	188	177	+11	11.75	11.06
2	Colorado Mammoth – x	16	10	6	.625	1.0	6–2	4–4	200	172	+28	12.50	10.75
3	Calgary Roughnecks – x	16	9	7	.562	2.0	4–4	5–3	183	178	+5	11.44	11.12
4	Arizona Sting – x	16	8	8	.500	3.0	4–4	4–4	198	199	−1	12.38	12.44
5	San Jose Stealth	16	5	11	.312	6.0	3–5	2–6	151	174	−23	9.44	10.88
6	Edmonton Rush	16	1	15	.062	10.0	0–8	1–7	150	202	−52	9.38	12.62

x: Clinched playoff berth; c: Clinched playoff berth by crossing over to another division; y: Clinched division; z: Clinched best regular season record; GP: Games Played
W: Wins; L: Losses; GB: Games back; PCT: Win percentage; Home: Record at Home; Road: Record on the Road; GF: Goals scored; GA: Goals allowed
Differential: Difference between goals scored and allowed; GF/GP: Average number of goals scored per game; GA/GP: Average number of goals allowed per game

=== Game log ===
Game	Date	Opponent	Location	Score	OT	Attendance	Record
1	January 6, 2006	San Jose Stealth	Rexall Place	L 9–10	OT	11,385	0–1
2	January 13, 2006	@ Calgary Roughnecks	Pengrowth Saddledome	L 9–11		13,335	0–2
3	January 21, 2006	Calgary Roughnecks	Rexall Place	L 9–12		11,676	0–3
4	January 27, 2006	@ Toronto Rock	Air Canada Centre	L 8–14		15,104	0–4
5	February 3, 2006	Minnesota Swarm	Rexall Place	L 6–7		8,745	0–5
6	February 11, 2006	Toronto Rock	Rexall Place	L 11–13		11,019	0–6
7	February 17, 2006	@ Calgary Roughnecks	Pengrowth Saddledome	W 12–11		12,025	1–6
8	March 3, 2006	@ Colorado Mammoth	Pepsi Center	L 10–15		16,732	1–7
9	March 4, 2006	Arizona Sting	Rexall Place	L 11–15		9,684	1–8
10	March 10, 2006	@ Arizona Sting	Jobing.com Arena	L 9–13		6,705	1–9
11	March 11, 2006	@ San Jose Stealth	HP Pavilion at San Jose	L 11–12		6,141	1–10
12	March 17, 2006	Calgary Roughnecks	Rexall Place	L 9–16		11,289	1–11
13	March 25, 2006	Colorado Mammoth	Rexall Place	L 7–13		9,527	1–12
14	March 31, 2006	Portland LumberJax	Rexall Place	L 12–15		9,613	1–13
15	April 2, 2006	@ Portland LumberJax	Rose Garden	L 10–14		5,687	1–14
16	April 14, 2006	@ Portland LumberJax	Rose Garden	L 7–11		11,408	1–15

== Player stats ==
=== Runners (Top 10) ===
Note: GP = Games played; G = Goals; A = Assists; Pts = Points; LB = Loose Balls; PIM = Penalty minutes

Player	GP	G	A	Pts	LB	PIM
Jamey Bowen	14	19	24	43	44	6
Kevin Howard	16	21	19	40	52	15
Jimmy Quinlan	16	20	19	39	86	22
Brad Dairon	16	15	21	36	62	21
Kerry Susheski	15	11	17	28	56	25
Jason Clark	6	7	19	26	19	2
Randy Daly	12	11	13	24	51	4
Mat Giles	11	8	14	22	40	24
D'Arcy Berthiame	11	4	14	18	86	4
Totals		223	373	363	1016	31

=== Goaltenders ===
Note: GP = Games played; MIN = Minutes; W = Wins; L = Losses; GA = Goals against; Sv% = Save percentage; GAA = Goals against average

Player	GP	MIN	W	L	GA	Sv%	GAA
Pat Campbell	16	707:33	1	11	152	.750	12.89
Dwight Maetche	13	239:13	0	4	45	.754	11.29
Totals			1	15	202	.746	12.63

== Awards ==
Player	Award
Andrew Turner	All-Star

== Transactions ==
=== Trades ===
July 13, 2005	To Edmonton Rush *1st round pick in 2007 Entry Draft - Mitch Belisle (D)	To Arizona Sting Rob Blasdell (G)
July 13, 2005	To Edmonton Rush **3rd round pick in 2005 Entry Draft - Jon Niziol (D)	To Buffalo Bandits Cory Bomberry (F)
July 13, 2005	To Edmonton Rush Jimmy Quinlan (F)	To Toronto Rock Scott Campbell (D)
July 20, 2005	To Edmonton Rush Chris McElroy (T); Matt Dwane (D)	To Arizona Sting ***2nd round pick in 2007 Entry Draft - Keegan Davidson (F)
July 20, 2005	To Edmonton Rush Kerry Susheski (T); Ted Jenner (F); 3rd round pick in 2005 Entry Draft - Shane Pederson (F)	To Minnesota Swarm Jeff Spano (D); Damien Davis (D); ****1st round pick in 2007 Entry Draft - Tyler Codron (D)
August 3, 2005	To Edmonton Rush *****2nd round pick in 2007 Entry Draft - Cory Conway (F)	To Portland LumberJax Matt Dwane (D)
August 9, 2005	To Edmonton Rush Andrew Turner (D); Cam Bergman (T); Buck Stobart (D)	To Rochester Knighthawks Sandy Chapman (D); 1st round pick in 2005 Entry Draft - Shawn Evans (F)
August 29, 2005	To Edmonton Rush Chris Fiore (F); 4th round pick in 2006 Entry Draft - Cory Melville (T); ***2nd round pick in 2007 Entry Draft - Keegan Davidson (F)	To Arizona Sting Mike McLellan (F); 3rd round pick in 2005 Entry Draft - Jon Niziol (D)
August 29, 2005	To Edmonton Rush 6th round pick in 2005 Entry Draft - Aaron Davis (F)	To Rochester Knighthawks 6th round pick in 2006 Entry Draft - David Lomas (F)
November 9, 2005	To Edmonton Rush Jordan Sundher (D)	To Calgary Roughnecks ******4th round pick in 2006 Entry Draft - Bill McGlone (F)
February 8, 2006	To Edmonton Rush Mat Giles (F)	To Toronto Rock 2nd round pick in 2006 Entry Draft - Mike McLeod (F)

*Later traded to the New York Titans
**Later traded to the Arizona Sting
***Later traded to the Boston Blazers
****Later traded to the Portland LumberJax
*****Later traded back to the Portland LumberJax
******Later traded to the Chicago Shamrox

=== Entry Draft ===
The 2005 NLL Entry Draft took place on August 29, 2005. The Rush made the following selections:

^{#} Denotes player who never played in the NLL regular season or playoffs

Round	Overall	Player	College/Club
2	14	Mike McLellan (F)	Mercyhurst College
3	24	Greg Whitenect (D)	Edmonton Jr. A
3	30	Shane Pederson^{#} (F)	Victoria Jr. A
4	35	Brad Rennie^{#} (D)	Elmira College
5	46	Jon Maresse^{#} (G)	Edmonton Jr. A
6	60	Aaron Davis^{#} (F)	Coquitlam Ontario Major

== Roster ==
No.		Position	Player
6	(Canada)	Def	Berthiame, D'Arcy
15	(Canada)	Fwd	Bowen, Jamey
37	(Canada)	Goalie	Campbell, Pat
13	(Canada)	Fwd	Clark, Jason
72	(Canada)	Fwd	Cornfield, Jordan
19	(Canada)	Fwd	Dairon, Brad
9	(Canada)	Fwd	Daly, Randy
34	(Canada)	Fwd	Giles, Mat
	(Canada)	Def	Gut, Peter
17	(United States)	Fwd	Heavenor, Tyler
21	(Canada)	Fwd	Hillier, Darren
18	(Canada)	Fwd	Howard, Kevin
23	(Canada)	Def	Jenner, Teddy

No.		Position	Player
1	(United States)	Goalie	Maetche, Dwight
44	(Canada)	Def	McElroy, Chris
	(Canada)	Fwd	McEwen, Kyle
43	(Canada)	Def	Melville, Cory
81	(Canada)	Fwd	Quinlan, Jimmy
55	(Canada)	Fwd	Sherbanuk, Colin
20	(Canada)	Fwd	Smalley, Trent
74	(United States)	Def	Stachniak, Chris
29	(Canada)	Def	Stobart, Buck
	(Canada)	Def	Sundher, Jordan
84	(Canada)	Fwd	Susheski, Kerry
26	(Canada)	Def	Turner, Andrew
22		?	Whitenect, Greg
33	(Canada)	Def	Williams, Rob

== See also ==
- 2006 NLL season
