= 2006 Buffalo Bandits season =

Lacrosse team season

2006 Buffalo Bandits
- East Division Champions
- League: NLL
- Division: 1st East
- 2006 record: 11–5
- Home record: 6–2
- Road record: 5–3
- Goals for: 193
- Goals against: 167
- General Manager: Darris Kilgour
- Coach: Darris Kilgour
- Captain: Richie Kilgour
- Alternate captains: John Tavares
- Arena: HSBC Arena
- Average attendance: 11,176

Team leaders
- Goals: Mark Steenhuis (34)
- Assists: John Tavares (53)
- Points: John Tavares (85)
- Penalties in minutes: Chris White (51)
- Loose Balls: Pat McCready (154)
- Wins: Steve Dietrich (10)
- Goals against average: Steve Dietrich (9.97)

The Buffalo Bandits are a lacrosse team based in Buffalo, New York playing in the National Lacrosse League (NLL). The 2006 season was the 15th season in franchise history.

The Bandits captured the Eastern division title by repeating their 11–5 record from 2005. They then spoiled the Minnesota Swarm's first ever playoff game by defeating them 11–10, and advanced to the championship game by beating Rochester, 15–10. The Bandits hosted the Championship game for the first time since 1997, but lost to Gary Gait's Colorado Mammoth, 16–9.

Goaltender Steve Dietrich made history twice, by being the first person to be named Goaltender of the Year in consecutive years (in fact, the first person to win the award twice), and also by being the first goaltender to be named NLL Most Valuable Player.

== Regular season ==
=== Conference standings ===
East Division
P	Team	GP	W	L	PCT	GB	Home	Road	GF	GA	Diff	GF/GP	GA/GP
1	Buffalo Bandits – xyz	16	11	5	.688	0.0	6–2	5–3	193	167	+26	12.06	10.44
2	Rochester Knighthawks – x	16	9	7	.562	2.0	6–2	3–5	196	180	+16	12.25	11.25
3	Toronto Rock – x	16	8	8	.500	3.0	5–3	3–5	182	179	+3	11.38	11.19
4	Minnesota Swarm – x	16	8	8	.500	3.0	3–5	5–3	158	171	−13	9.88	10.69
5	Philadelphia Wings	16	8	8	.500	3.0	5–3	3–5	184	184	−-0	11.50	11.50

West Division
P	Team	GP	W	L	PCT	GB	Home	Road	GF	GA	Diff	GF/GP	GA/GP
1	Portland LumberJax – xy	16	11	5	.688	0.0	5–3	6–2	188	177	+11	11.75	11.06
2	Colorado Mammoth – x	16	10	6	.625	1.0	6–2	4–4	200	172	+28	12.50	10.75
3	Calgary Roughnecks – x	16	9	7	.562	2.0	4–4	5–3	183	178	+5	11.44	11.12
4	Arizona Sting – x	16	8	8	.500	3.0	4–4	4–4	198	199	−1	12.38	12.44
5	San Jose Stealth	16	5	11	.312	6.0	3–5	2–6	151	174	−23	9.44	10.88
6	Edmonton Rush	16	1	15	.062	10.0	0–8	1–7	150	202	−52	9.38	12.62

x: Clinched playoff berth; c: Clinched playoff berth by crossing over to another division; y: Clinched division; z: Clinched best regular season record; GP: Games Played
W: Wins; L: Losses; GB: Games back; PCT: Win percentage; Home: Record at Home; Road: Record on the Road; GF: Goals scored; GA: Goals allowed
Differential: Difference between goals scored and allowed; GF/GP: Average number of goals scored per game; GA/GP: Average number of goals allowed per game

=== Game log ===
Game	Date	Opponent	Location	Score	OT	Attendance	Record
1	January 13, 2006	@ Toronto Rock	Air Canada Centre	W 13–11		15,104	1–0
2	January 21, 2006	Toronto Rock	HSBC Arena	W 13–10		13,072	2–0
3	January 28, 2006	@ Rochester Knighthawks	Blue Cross Arena	L 10–11	OT	11,121	2–1
4	February 10, 2006	Portland LumberJax	HSBC Arena	W 16–6		10,395	3–1
5	February 11, 2006	@ Philadelphia Wings	Wachovia Center	L 9–10		11,207	3–2
6	February 18, 2006	Minnesota Swarm	HSBC Arena	W 14–9		12,458	4–2
7	March 4, 2006	Minnesota Swarm	HSBC Arena	L 8–11		10,961	4–3
8	March 11, 2006	Toronto Rock	HSBC Arena	L 8–10		14,064	4–4
9	March 18, 2006	@ Rochester Knighthawks	Blue Cross Arena	W 14–13		10,209	5–4
10	March 24, 2006	@ Minnesota Swarm	Xcel Energy Center	W 13–11		9,533	6–4
11	March 25, 2006	Rochester Knighthawks	HSBC Arena	W 18–13		13,722	7–4
12	March 31, 2006	@ San Jose Stealth	HP Pavilion at San Jose	W 11–9		5,143	8–4
13	April 1, 2006	@ Arizona Sting	Jobing.com Arena	W 13–10		6,759	9–4
14	April 8, 2006	Colorado Mammoth	HSBC Arena	W 14–12		11,895	10–4
15	April 14, 2006	Philadelphia Wings	HSBC Arena	W 8–7		10,379	11–4
16	April 15, 2006	@ Philadelphia Wings	Wachovia Center	L 11–14		12,796	11–5

== Playoffs ==
=== Game log ===
Game	Date	Opponent	Location	Score	OT	Attendance	Record
Division Semifinal	April 23, 2006	Minnesota Swarm	HSBC Arena	W 11–10		8,110	1–0
Division Final	April 29, 2006	Rochester Knighthawks	HSBC Arena	W 15–10		10,897	2–0
Championship Game	May 13, 2006	Colorado Mammoth	HSBC Arena	L 9–16		16,104	2–1

== Player stats ==
=== Runners (Top 10) ===
Note: GP = Games played; G = Goals; A = Assists; Pts = Points; LB = Loose Balls; PIM = Penalty minutes

Player	GP	G	A	Pts	LB	PIM
John Tavares	16	32	53	85	95	12
Mark Steenhuis	15	34	23	57	144	22
Dan Teat	15	27	29	56	50	10
Cory Bomberry	15	21	27	48	89	22
Delby Powless	15	12	33	45	64	10
Pat McCready	15	11	15	26	154	36
Kim Squire	12	13	10	23	43	12
A.J. Shannon	9	7	16	23	44	2
Lindsay Plunkett	7	9	9	18	21	4
Totals		287	480	402	1039	50

=== Goaltenders ===
Note: GP = Games played; MIN = Minutes; W = Wins; L = Losses; GA = Goals against; Sv% = Save percentage; GAA = Goals against average

Player	GP	MIN	W	L	GA	Sv%	GAA
Steve Dietrich	16	812:34	10	4	135	.808	9.97
Ken Montour	7	116:48	1	1	25	.775	12.84
Ryan Avery	6	30:00	0	0	6	.800	12.00
Totals			11	5	167	.802	10.44

== Awards ==
Player	Award
Steve Dietrich	NLL Most Valuable Player
Steve Dietrich	Goaltender of the Year
Steve Dietrich	First Team All-Pro
John Tavares	Second Team All-Pro
John Tavares	All-Stars
Steve Dietrich	All-Stars
Mark Steenhuis	All-Stars

== Transactions ==
=== Trades ===
February 21, 2006	To Buffalo Bandits Ken Montour third round pick, 2007 entry draft	To Calgary Roughnecks first round pick, 2006 entry draft
February 21, 2006	To Buffalo Bandits first round pick, 2006 entry draft	To Calgary Roughnecks Ryan Avery
March 23, 2006	To Buffalo Bandits Jason Crosbie	To Arizona Sting Lindsay Plunkett fourth round pick, 2007 entry draft

== Roster ==
No.		Position	Player
	(Canada)	Goalie	Avery, Ryan
72	(Haudenosaunee)	Fwd	Bomberry, Cory
2	(Canada)	Def	Bonterre, Troy
27	(Canada)	Def	Couling, Kyle
54	(Canada)	Fwd	Crosbie, Jason
30	(Canada)	Goalie	Dietrich, Steve
	(United States)	Def	Francey, Tyler
7	(Canada)	Fwd	Harasym, Jon
5	(Haudenosaunee)	Def	Hill, Clay
97	(Canada)	Fwd	Kazarian, Bryan
16	(Haudenosaunee)	Def	Kilgour, Rich
32	(Canada)	Def	Langdale, Chris
17	(Canada)	Def	Laverty, Kyle

No.		Position	Player
23	(Canada)	Def	McCready, Pat
29	(Haudenosaunee)	Goalie	Montour, Ken
	(Canada)	Fwd	Plunkett, Lindsay
99	(Haudenosaunee)	Fwd	Powless, Delby
12		Fwd	Schmelzie, Kyle
8	(Canada)	Fwd	Shannon, A.J.
77	(Canada)	Def	Shattler, Jeff
3	(Canada)	Def	Smith, Billy Dee
93	(Haudenosaunee)	Fwd	Squire, Kim
9	(Canada)	Fwd	Steenhuis, Mark
11	(Canada)	Fwd	Tavares, John
15	(Canada)	Fwd	Teat, Dan
81	(Haudenosaunee)	Fwd	Vyse, Roger
6	(Canada)	Def	White, Chris

== See also ==
- 2006 NLL season
