= 2006 Minnesota Swarm season =

2006 Minnesota Swarm
- League: NLL
- Division: 3rd East
- 2006 record: 9-7
- Home record: 4-4
- Road record: 5-3
- Goals for: 158
- Goals against: 171
- General Manager: Marty O'Neill
- Coach: Adam Mueller
- Captain: Ryan Cousins
- Arena: Xcel Energy Center
- Average attendance: 9,582

Team leaders
- Goals: Kasey Biernes (24)
- Assists: Ryan Ward (47)
- Points: Ryan Ward (66)
- Penalties in minutes: Ryan Cousins (32)
- Loose Balls: Mark Miyashita
- Wins: Nick Patterson (6)
- Goals against average: Nick Patterson (10.40)

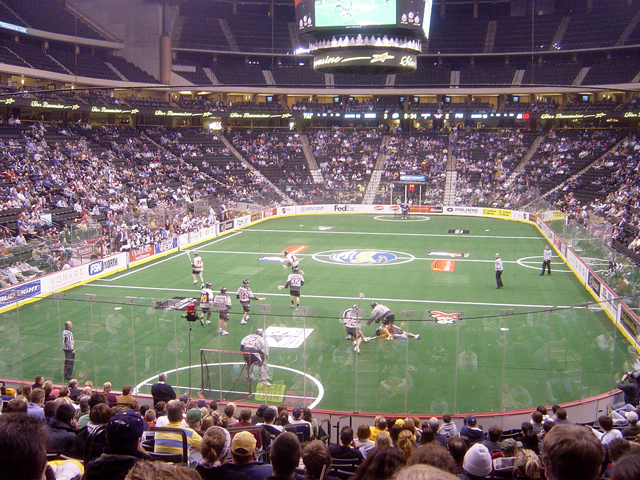
The 2006 National Lacrosse League game with the Philadelphia Wings visiting the Minnesota Swarm at the Xcel Energy Center, St. Paul, Minnesota.

The Minnesota Swarm are a lacrosse team based in Saint Paul, Minnesota playing in the National Lacrosse League (NLL). The 2006 season was the 2nd in franchise history.

== Regular season ==
=== Conference standings ===
East Division
P	Team	GP	W	L	PCT	GB	Home	Road	GF	GA	Diff	GF/GP	GA/GP
1	Buffalo Bandits – xyz	16	11	5	.688	0.0	6–2	5–3	193	167	+26	12.06	10.44
2	Rochester Knighthawks – x	16	9	7	.562	2.0	6–2	3–5	196	180	+16	12.25	11.25
3	Toronto Rock – x	16	8	8	.500	3.0	5–3	3–5	182	179	+3	11.38	11.19
4	Minnesota Swarm – x	16	8	8	.500	3.0	3–5	5–3	158	171	−13	9.88	10.69
5	Philadelphia Wings	16	8	8	.500	3.0	5–3	3–5	184	184	−-0	11.50	11.50

West Division
P	Team	GP	W	L	PCT	GB	Home	Road	GF	GA	Diff	GF/GP	GA/GP
1	Portland LumberJax – xy	16	11	5	.688	0.0	5–3	6–2	188	177	+11	11.75	11.06
2	Colorado Mammoth – x	16	10	6	.625	1.0	6–2	4–4	200	172	+28	12.50	10.75
3	Calgary Roughnecks – x	16	9	7	.562	2.0	4–4	5–3	183	178	+5	11.44	11.12
4	Arizona Sting – x	16	8	8	.500	3.0	4–4	4–4	198	199	−1	12.38	12.44
5	San Jose Stealth	16	5	11	.312	6.0	3–5	2–6	151	174	−23	9.44	10.88
6	Edmonton Rush	16	1	15	.062	10.0	0–8	1–7	150	202	−52	9.38	12.62

x: Clinched playoff berth; c: Clinched playoff berth by crossing over to another division; y: Clinched division; z: Clinched best regular season record; GP: Games Played
W: Wins; L: Losses; GB: Games back; PCT: Win percentage; Home: Record at Home; Road: Record on the Road; GF: Goals scored; GA: Goals allowed
Differential: Difference between goals scored and allowed; GF/GP: Average number of goals scored per game; GA/GP: Average number of goals allowed per game

=== Game log ===
Game	Date	Opponent	Location	Score	OT	Attendance	Record
1	January 6, 2006	Philadelphia Wings	Xcel Energy Center	L 11–15		8,024	0–1
2	January 14, 2006	@ Philadelphia Wings	Wachovia Center	W 13–10		11,874	1–1
3	January 20, 2006	@ Calgary Roughnecks	Pengrowth Saddledome	W 12–8		10,637	2–1
4	January 21, 2006	Rochester Knighthawks	Xcel Energy Center	L 6–12		7,124	2–2
5	January 29, 2006	Rochester Knighthawks	Xcel Energy Center	L 9–10		7,544	2–3
6	February 3, 2006	@ Edmonton Rush	Rexall Place	W 7–6		8,745	3–3
7	February 10, 2006	Philadelphia Wings	Xcel Energy Center	W 11–10		7,524	4–3
8	February 18, 2006	@ Buffalo Bandits	HSBC Arena	L 9–14		12,458	4–4
9	March 3, 2006	@ Toronto Rock	Air Canada Centre	L 8–13		15,830	4–5
10	March 4, 2006	@ Buffalo Bandits	HSBC Arena	W 11–8		10,961	5–5
11	March 17, 2006	@ Portland LumberJax	Rose Garden	W 14–12		5,487	6–5
12	March 24, 2006	Buffalo Bandits	Xcel Energy Center	L 11–13		9,533	6–6
13	April 1, 2006	Toronto Rock	Xcel Energy Center	W 10–9		10,084	7–6
14	April 8, 2006	@ Rochester Knighthawks	Blue Cross Arena	L 9–10		10,352	7–7
15	April 9, 2006	San Jose Stealth	Xcel Energy Center	W 9–8	OT	7,044	8–7
16	April 15, 2006	Portland LumberJax	Xcel Energy Center	L 8–13		10,104	8–8

== Playoffs ==
=== Game log ===
Game	Date	Opponent	Location	Score	OT	Attendance	Record
Division Semifinal	April 23, 2006	@ Buffalo Bandits	HSBC Arena	L 10–11		8,110	0–1

== Player stats ==
=== Runners (Top 10) ===
Note: GP = Games played; G = Goals; A = Assists; Pts = Points; LB = Loose Balls; PIM = Penalty minutes

Player	GP	G	A	Pts	LB	PIM
Ryan Ward	16	19	47	66	37	16
Chad Culp	15	20	35	55	69	25
Kasey Beirnes	15	24	28	52	60	12
Sean Pollock	15	16	24	40	62	20
Jamie Taylor	15	8	24	32	26	12
Kelly Hall	8	16	9	25	21	16
Brock Boyle	16	13	11	24	48	23
D'Arcy Berthiaume	8	4	10	14	52	12
Mark Miyashita	10	4	10	14	87	4
Totals		259	417	309	992	45

=== Goaltenders ===
Note: GP = Games played; MIN = Minutes; W = Wins; L = Losses; GA = Goals against; Sv% = Save percentage; GAA = Goals against average

Player	GP	MIN	W	L	GA	Sv%	GAA
Nick Patterson	16	524:58	6	2	91	.790	10.40
Matt Disher	16	428:39	2	6	78	.773	10.92
Totals			8	8	171	.780	10.69

== Awards ==
Player	Award
Nick Patterson	Second Team All-Pro
Nick Patterson	Overall Player of the Month, February
Ryan Cousins	All-Star

== Transactions ==
=== Trades ===
February 2, 2006	To Minnesota Swarm Scott Stewart	To Portland LumberJax Ryder Bateman
March 14, 2006	To Minnesota Swarm Andrew Biers	To Calgary Roughnecks second round pick, 2006 entry draft third round pick, 2006 entry draft
March 14, 2006	To Minnesota Swarm first round pick, 2008 entry draft second round pick, 2006 entry draft	To Toronto Rock Darryl Gibson second round pick, 2007 entry draft

== Roster ==
No.		Position	Player
	(Canada)	Fwd	Bateman, Ryder
22	(Canada)	Fwd	Beirnes, Kasey
	(United States)	Fwd	Berthiaume, DArcy
18	(Canada)	Fwd	Biers, Andrew
10	(Canada)	Def	Boyle, Brock
50	(Canada)	Def	Cousins, Ryan
19	(Canada)	Fwd	Culp, Chad
1	(Canada)	Goalie	Disher, Matt
	(Canada)	Def	Gibson, Darryl
11	(Canada)	Fwd	Hall, Kelly
28	(Canada)	Def	Heavenor, Nolan
	(United States)	Fwd	Henderson, Tony
73	(Canada)	Fwd	Hill, Dean
47	(United States)	Fwd	Hill, Travis

No.		Position	Player
77	(Canada)	Def	Kemp, Riley
55	(Canada)	Def	Kilby, Mike
15	(Canada)	Fwd	Martin, Spencer
8	(Canada)	Fwd	McDade, Rory
39	(Canada)	Def	Miyashita, Mark
12	(Canada)	Def	Pacey, Eric
93	(Canada)	Goalie	Patterson, Nick
17	(Canada)	Fwd	Pollock, Sean
	(Canada)	Fwd	Stewart, Scott
23	(Canada)	Def	Sullivan, Jon
33	(Canada)	Def	Summerfield, Shawn
16	(Canada)	Fwd	Talbot, Noah
40	(Canada)	Fwd	Taylor, Jamie
44	(Canada)	Fwd	Ward, Ryan

== See also ==
- 2006 NLL season
