= 2006 Arizona Sting season =

Lacrosse team in Phoenix, Arizona, US

2006 Arizona Sting
- League: NLL
- Division: 4th West
- 2006 record: 8-8
- Home record: 4-4
- Road record: 4-4
- Goals for: 198
- Goals against: 199
- General Manager: Bob Hamley
- Coach: Bob Hamley
- Arena: Jobing.com Arena
- Average attendance: 8,919

Team leaders
- Goals: Craig Conn (44)
- Assists: Dan Dawson (48)
- Points: Dan Dawson (82)
- Penalties in minutes: Craig Conn (42)
- Loose Balls: Bruce Codd (117)
- Wins: Rob Blasdell (5)
- Goals against average: Mike Miron (12.41)

The Arizona Sting were a lacrosse team based in Phoenix, Arizona playing in the National Lacrosse League (NLL). The 2006 season was the 6th in franchise history and 3rd in Arizona.

After making it to the Championship game in 2005, the Sting had a disappointing 8-8 season in 2006. The Sting upset the division-winning Portland LumberJax 14-10 in the Western Division semifinals, but the eventual champion Colorado Mammoth defeated the Sting 13-12 in Colorado in the Division finals.

== Regular season ==
=== Conference standings ===
East Division
P	Team	GP	W	L	PCT	GB	Home	Road	GF	GA	Diff	GF/GP	GA/GP
1	Buffalo Bandits – xyz	16	11	5	.688	0.0	6–2	5–3	193	167	+26	12.06	10.44
2	Rochester Knighthawks – x	16	9	7	.562	2.0	6–2	3–5	196	180	+16	12.25	11.25
3	Toronto Rock – x	16	8	8	.500	3.0	5–3	3–5	182	179	+3	11.38	11.19
4	Minnesota Swarm – x	16	8	8	.500	3.0	3–5	5–3	158	171	−13	9.88	10.69
5	Philadelphia Wings	16	8	8	.500	3.0	5–3	3–5	184	184	−-0	11.50	11.50

West Division
P	Team	GP	W	L	PCT	GB	Home	Road	GF	GA	Diff	GF/GP	GA/GP
1	Portland LumberJax – xy	16	11	5	.688	0.0	5–3	6–2	188	177	+11	11.75	11.06
2	Colorado Mammoth – x	16	10	6	.625	1.0	6–2	4–4	200	172	+28	12.50	10.75
3	Calgary Roughnecks – x	16	9	7	.562	2.0	4–4	5–3	183	178	+5	11.44	11.12
4	Arizona Sting – x	16	8	8	.500	3.0	4–4	4–4	198	199	−1	12.38	12.44
5	San Jose Stealth	16	5	11	.312	6.0	3–5	2–6	151	174	−23	9.44	10.88
6	Edmonton Rush	16	1	15	.062	10.0	0–8	1–7	150	202	−52	9.38	12.62

x: Clinched playoff berth; c: Clinched playoff berth by crossing over to another division; y: Clinched division; z: Clinched best regular season record; GP: Games Played
W: Wins; L: Losses; GB: Games back; PCT: Win percentage; Home: Record at Home; Road: Record on the Road; GF: Goals scored; GA: Goals allowed
Differential: Difference between goals scored and allowed; GF/GP: Average number of goals scored per game; GA/GP: Average number of goals allowed per game

=== Game log ===
Game	Date	Opponent	Location	Score	OT	Attendance	Record
1	January 7, 2006	@ Toronto Rock	Air Canada Centre	W 14–13	OT	17,527	1–0
2	January 13, 2006	Portland LumberJax	Jobing.com Arena	W 12–7		6,127	2–0
3	January 27, 2006	Calgary Roughnecks	Jobing.com Arena	W 11–10	OT	6,326	3–0
4	February 3, 2006	Colorado Mammoth	Jobing.com Arena	L 17–18	OT	6,373	3–1
5	February 11, 2006	@ Rochester Knighthawks	Blue Cross Arena	L 14–16		9,386	3–2
6	February 18, 2006	Calgary Roughnecks	Jobing.com Arena	L 7–13		6,535	3–3
7	March 4, 2006	@ Edmonton Rush	Rexall Place	W 15–11		9,684	4–3
8	March 10, 2006	Edmonton Rush	Jobing.com Arena	W 13–9		6,705	5–3
9	March 11, 2006	@ Portland LumberJax	Rose Garden	L 10–12		7,803	5–4
10	March 18, 2006	Colorado Mammoth	Jobing.com Arena	L 11–15		6,420	5–5
11	March 25, 2006	@ Philadelphia Wings	Wachovia Center	W 13–12		11,693	6–5
12	April 1, 2006	Buffalo Bandits	Jobing.com Arena	L 10–13		6,759	6–6
13	April 2, 2006	@ Colorado Mammoth	Pepsi Center	L 11–16		16,435	6–7
14	April 8, 2006	@ Calgary Roughnecks	Pengrowth Saddledome	L 12–14		12,173	6–8
15	April 14, 2006	San Jose Stealth	Jobing.com Arena	W 16–13		6,575	7–8
16	April 15, 2006	@ San Jose Stealth	HP Pavilion at San Jose	W 12–7		6,188	8–8

== Playoffs ==
=== Game log ===
Game	Date	Opponent	Location	Score	OT	Attendance	Record
Division Semifinal	April 22, 2006	@ Portland LumberJax	Rose Garden	W 14–11		10,843	1–0
Division Final	April 29, 2006	@ Colorado Mammoth	Pepsi Center	L 12–13		12,537	1–1

== Player stats ==
=== Runners (Top 10) ===
Note: GP = Games played; G = Goals; A = Assists; Pts = Points; LB = Loose Balls; PIM = Penalty minutes

Player	GP	G	A	Pts	LB	PIM
Dan Dawson	16	34	48	82	76	8
Craig Conn	15	44	23	67	91	42
Pat Maddalena	15	24	34	58	58	6
Jonas Derks	10	18	24	42	42	8
Jason Crosbie	9	12	29	41	30	7
Matt Brown	16	16	19	35	47	6
Lindsay Plunkett	6	8	16	24	20	4
Curt Malawsky	8	10	11	21	30	4
Peter Veltman	15	7	13	20	50	20
Totals		318	516	235	1045	36

=== Goaltenders ===
Note: GP = Games played; MIN = Minutes; W = Wins; L = Losses; GA = Goals against; Sv% = Save percentage; GAA = Goals against average

Player	GP	MIN	W	L	GA	Sv%	GAA
Rob Blasdell	15	621:59	5	5	129	.737	12.44
Mike Miron	16	338:27	3	3	70	.742	12.41
Ken Montour	0	0:00	0	0	0	.000	.00
Totals			8	8	199	.739	12.44

== Awards ==
Player	Award
Craig Conn	Second Team All-Pro
Dan Dawson	Second Team All-Pro
Craig Conn	All-Stars
Bruce Codd	All-Stars
Jonas Derks	All-Stars
Peter Lough	All-Stars
Scott Self	All-Stars

== Transactions ==
=== Trades ===
March 23, 2006	To Arizona Sting Lindsay Plunkett fourth round pick, 2007 entry draft	To Buffalo Bandits Jason Crosbie

== Roster ==
No.		Position	Player
31	(Canada)	Goalie	Blasdell, Rob
16	(Canada)	Fwd	Brown, Matt
	(Canada)	Fwd	Clark, Jason
5	(Canada)	?	Cochrane, Mark
9	(Canada)	Def	Codd, Bruce
8	(Canada)	Fwd	Conn, Craig
	(Canada)	Fwd	Crosbie, Jason
6	(Canada)	Fwd	Dawson, Dan
43	(Canada)	Fwd	Derks, Jonas
14	(Canada)	Def	Guindon, Andrew
18	(Canada)	Def	Halls, Darren
17	(Canada)	Def	Hinman, Greg
4	(Haudenosaunee)	Fwd	Lazore, Andrew

No.		Position	Player
27	(Canada)	Def	Lough, Peter
42	(United States)	Fwd	Maddalena, Pat
11	(Canada)	Fwd	Malawsky, Curt
36	(Canada)	Fwd	McKay, Chris
19	(United States)	Fwd	McLellan, Mike
41	(Canada)	Goalie	Miron, Mike
	(Haudenosaunee)	Goalie	Montour, Ken
10	(Canada)	Def	Murray, Bruce
12	(Canada)	Fwd	Plunkett, Lindsay
21	(Canada)	Fwd	Secore, Andy
7	(Canada)	Def	Self, Scott
24	(Canada)	Def	Seller, Chris
33	(Canada)	Fwd	Veltman, Peter

== See also ==
- 2006 NLL season
