= 2006 Rochester Knighthawks season =

NLL team season

2006 Rochester Knighthawks
- League: NLL
- Division: 2nd East
- 2006 record: 9-7
- Home record: 6-2
- Road record: 3-5
- Goals for: 196
- Goals against: 180
- General Manager: Jody Gage
- Coach: Ed Comeau
- Captain: Mike Hasen
- Alternate captains: Shawn Williams; John Grant, Jr.
- Arena: Blue Cross Arena
- Average attendance: 10,657

Team leaders
- Goals: John Grant, Jr. (54)
- Assists: Shawn Williams (49)
- Points: John Grant, Jr. (97)
- Penalties in minutes: Shawn Evans (59)
- Loose Balls: Steve Toll (119)
- Wins: Pat O'Toole (9)
- Goals against average: Pat O'Toole (10.93)

The Rochester Knighthawks were a lacrosse team based in Rochester, New York that played in the National Lacrosse League (NLL). The 2006 season was the 12th in franchise history.

== Regular season ==
=== Conference standings ===
East Division
P	Team	GP	W	L	PCT	GB	Home	Road	GF	GA	Diff	GF/GP	GA/GP
1	Buffalo Bandits – xyz	16	11	5	.688	0.0	6–2	5–3	193	167	+26	12.06	10.44
2	Rochester Knighthawks – x	16	9	7	.562	2.0	6–2	3–5	196	180	+16	12.25	11.25
3	Toronto Rock – x	16	8	8	.500	3.0	5–3	3–5	182	179	+3	11.38	11.19
4	Minnesota Swarm – x	16	8	8	.500	3.0	3–5	5–3	158	171	−13	9.88	10.69
5	Philadelphia Wings	16	8	8	.500	3.0	5–3	3–5	184	184	−-0	11.50	11.50

West Division
P	Team	GP	W	L	PCT	GB	Home	Road	GF	GA	Diff	GF/GP	GA/GP
1	Portland LumberJax – xy	16	11	5	.688	0.0	5–3	6–2	188	177	+11	11.75	11.06
2	Colorado Mammoth – x	16	10	6	.625	1.0	6–2	4–4	200	172	+28	12.50	10.75
3	Calgary Roughnecks – x	16	9	7	.562	2.0	4–4	5–3	183	178	+5	11.44	11.12
4	Arizona Sting – x	16	8	8	.500	3.0	4–4	4–4	198	199	−1	12.38	12.44
5	San Jose Stealth	16	5	11	.312	6.0	3–5	2–6	151	174	−23	9.44	10.88
6	Edmonton Rush	16	1	15	.062	10.0	0–8	1–7	150	202	−52	9.38	12.62

x: Clinched playoff berth; c: Clinched playoff berth by crossing over to another division; y: Clinched division; z: Clinched best regular season record; GP: Games Played
W: Wins; L: Losses; GB: Games back; PCT: Win percentage; Home: Record at Home; Road: Record on the Road; GF: Goals scored; GA: Goals allowed
Differential: Difference between goals scored and allowed; GF/GP: Average number of goals scored per game; GA/GP: Average number of goals allowed per game

=== Game log ===
Game	Date	Opponent	Location	Score	OT	Attendance	Record
1	January 7, 2006	@ Colorado Mammoth	Pepsi Center	L 11–12		16,850	0–1
2	January 14, 2006	Toronto Rock	Blue Cross Arena	W 14–9		10,156	1–1
3	January 21, 2006	@ Minnesota Swarm	Xcel Energy Center	W 12–6		7,124	2–1
4	January 28, 2006	Buffalo Bandits	Blue Cross Arena	W 11–10	OT	11,121	3–1
5	January 29, 2006	@ Minnesota Swarm	Xcel Energy Center	W 10–9		7,544	4–1
6	February 10, 2006	@ Toronto Rock	Air Canada Centre	L 10–11	OT	16,235	4–2
7	February 11, 2006	Arizona Sting	Blue Cross Arena	W 16–14		9,386	5–2
8	February 18, 2006	San Jose Stealth	Blue Cross Arena	L 12–13		9,731	5–3
9	March 4, 2006	@ Portland LumberJax	Rose Garden	W 18–16		6,183	6–3
10	March 10, 2006	Philadelphia Wings	Blue Cross Arena	W 17–8		9,052	7–3
11	March 11, 2006	@ Philadelphia Wings	Wachovia Center	L 12–16		10,959	7–4
12	March 18, 2006	Buffalo Bandits	Blue Cross Arena	L 13–14	OT	10,209	7–5
13	March 25, 2006	@ Buffalo Bandits	HSBC Arena	L 13–18		13,722	7–6
14	April 1, 2006	@ Philadelphia Wings	Wachovia Center	L 7–8		12,001	7–7
15	April 8, 2006	Minnesota Swarm	Blue Cross Arena	W 10–9		10,352	8–7
16	April 15, 2006	Toronto Rock	Blue Cross Arena	W 10–7		9,899	9–7

== Playoffs ==
=== Game log ===
Game	Date	Opponent	Location	Score	OT	Attendance	Record
Division Semifinal	April 22, 2006	Toronto Rock	Blue Cross Arena	W 16–8		7,295	1–0
Division Final	April 29, 2006	@ Buffalo Bandits	HSBC Arena	L 10–15		10,897	1–1

== Player stats ==
=== Runners (Top 10) ===
Note: GP = Games played; G = Goals; A = Assists; Pts = Points; LB = Loose Balls; PIM = Penalty minutes

Player	GP	G	A	Pts	LB	PIM
John Grant, Jr.	16	54	43	97	86	22
Shawn Williams	16	31	49	80	68	14
Scott Evans	16	22	48	70	81	55
Mike Accursi	16	27	36	63	61	10
Shawn Evans	15	21	16	37	110	59
Steve Toll	16	14	18	32	119	6
Ken Millin	11	4	12	16	20	0
Ryan O'Connor	7	5	6	11	7	11
Pat Dutton	10	4	7	11	39	4
Totals		281	477	387	1094	49

=== Goaltenders ===
Note: GP = Games played; MIN = Minutes; W = Wins; L = Losses; GA = Goals against; Sv% = Save percentage; GAA = Goals against average

Player	GP	MIN	W	L	GA	Sv%	GAA
Pat O'Toole	16	927:35	9	6	169	.780	10.93
Grant Crawley	16	29:03	0	1	9	.400	18.59
Totals			9	7	180	.770	11.25

== Awards ==
Player	Award
John Grant, Jr.	First Team All-Pro
Shawn Evans	All-Rookie Team
John Grant, Jr.	Overall Player of the Month, January
John Grant, Jr.	All-Stars
Steve Toll	All-Stars
Marshall Abrams	All-Stars
Shawn Williams	All-Stars

== Transactions ==
=== Trades ===
March 14, 2006	To Rochester Knighthawks third round pick, 2006 entry draft	To Colorado Mammoth Andrew Burkholder

== Roster ==
No.		Position	Player
43	(United States)	Def	Abrams, Marshall
44	(Canada)	Fwd	Accursi, Mike
	(Canada)	Fwd	Burkholder, Andrew
5	(Canada)	Fwd	Chapman, Sandy
	(United States)	Def	Cougevan, Pat
52	(Canada)	Goalie	Crawley, Grant
12	(Canada)	Fwd	Croswell, Brian
25	(United States)	Def	Ditzell, Scott
7	(United States)	Fwd	Dutton, Pat
19	(Canada)	Fwd	Evans, Scott
15	(Canada)	Fwd	Evans, Shawn
24	(Canada)	Fwd	Grant, John

No.		Position	Player
21	(Canada)	Fwd	Greer, Bill
10	(Canada)	Def	Hasen, Mike
23	(Canada)	Def	Hoar, Stephen
4	(Canada)	Def	Livingstone, Carter
26	(United States)	?	Miller, Blake
32	(Canada)	Fwd	Millin, Ken
14	(Canada)	Fwd	O'Connor, Ryan
39	(Canada)	Goalie	O'Toole, Pat
20	(Canada)	Def	Penny, Steve
2	(United States)	Def	Schiller, Chris
11	(United States)	Def	Thorpe, Regy
17	(Canada)	Def	Toll, Steve
51	(Canada)	Fwd	Williams, Shawn

== See also ==
- 2006 NLL season
