= Mike Regan (lacrosse) =

American lacrosse player

Personal information
- Nationality: American
- Born: July 17, 1978 (age 47) Albany, New York, U.S.

Sport
- Position: Forward
- NLL draft: 10th overall, 2000; Albany Attack
- NLL teams: Philadelphia Wings; San Jose Stealth; Albany Attack
- MLL teams: Boston Cannons
- Pro career: 2001–2006

Mike Regan (born July 17, 1978) is a retired lacrosse player. He played for the Albany Attack, San Jose Stealth, and the Philadelphia Wings in the National Lacrosse League, and the Boston Cannons of Major League Lacrosse.

Regan attended high school at Christian Brothers Academy and played college lacrosse at Butler University. Regan also played in international tournaments on the 2002 and 2004 American Heritage Cup teams.

On January 10, 2004, Regan scored his fourth goal of the night with no time remaining to give the Stealth a 13–12 win over the Colorado Mammoth in their first-ever home game in San Jose.

== Statistics ==
=== NLL ===
		Regular Season						Playoffs
Season	Team	GP	G	A	Pts	LB	PIM	GP	G	A	Pts	LB	PIM
2001	Albany	13	18	7	25	40	21	--	--	--	--	--	--
2002	Albany	16	32	26	58	54	17	2	2	2	4	4	2
2003	Albany	16	44	10	55	50	22	--	--	--	--	--	--
2004	San Jose	16	44	30	74	64	10	1	1	3	4	3	4
2005	San Jose	2	1	1	2	12	0	--	--	--	--	--	--
2006	Philadelphia	6	6	11	17	24	10	--	--	--	--	--	--
NLL totals		69	134	84	218	244	80	3	3	5	8	7	6
