= Lewis Ratcliff =

Canadian lacrosse player (born 1981)

Personal information
- Nationality: Canadian; England
- Born: April 24, 1981 (age 45) London, England
- Height: 6 ft 1 in (185 cm)
- Weight: 210 lb (95 kg; 15 st 0 lb)

Sport
- Position: Forward
- Shoots: Left
- NLL teams: Vancouver Stealth; Washington Stealth; Toronto Rock; Calgary Roughnecks
- MLL teams: San Francisco Dragons
- Pro career: 2003–2015

Lewis Ratcliff (born April 24, 1981) is an English-Canadian former professional lacrosse player. Originally from London, England, Ratcliff moved to Victoria at the age of 7.

== NLL career ==
Ratcliff was drafted 49th overall by the Calgary Roughnecks in the 2001 NLL entry draft. In 2004, the Roughnecks won the Champion's Cup, defeating the Buffalo Bandits in Buffalo. In 2006, Ratcliff was named MVP of the NLL All-Star Game, scoring 4 goals, one of which was the game winner with only 4.4 seconds left in the game.

On March 25, 2008, Ratcliff was traded to the Toronto Rock for forward Josh Sanderson. After a single season in Toronto, Ratcliff was traded back west to the Washington Stealth along with Tyler Codron and Joel Dalgarno in a blockbuster deal for former NLL MVP Colin Doyle. He stayed with the Stealth through their move to Vancouver, and announced his retirement on February 6, 2015.

== WLA career ==
Ratcliff was a longtime member of the Victoria Shamrocks of the Western Lacrosse Association out of British Columbia Canada. He is a 2-time Mann Cup champion with the team and has twice led the league in scoring. In early 2010 Ratcliff was traded (with the consent of the Shamrock players and coaching staff), to the Nanaimo Timbermen of the WLA at his own request to be closer to his current place of residence.

In September 2012, Ratcliff tested positive for use of two forms of steroids and a prohibited pain medication during the Mann Cup. Ratcliff has waived his hearing and accepted his suspension which is due to end on November 9, 2014.

== MLL career ==
Ratcliff was drafted by the San Francisco Dragons of the MLL in 2006. He played one game and recorded 1 goal and 1 assist. Later in the season he was put on waivers due to his commitment of playing in the WLA rather than the MLL.

== Statistics ==
=== NLL ===
Lewis Ratcliff		Regular season									Playoffs								
Season	Team	GP	G	A	Pts	LB	PIM	Pts/GP	LB/GP	PIM/GP	GP	G	A	Pts	LB	PIM	Pts/GP	LB/GP	PIM/GP
2003	Calgary Roughnecks	14	24	21	45	64	4	3.21	4.57	0.29	1	3	2	5	10	0	5.00	10.00	0.00
2004	Calgary Roughnecks	16	34	37	71	42	12	4.44	2.63	0.75	3	6	11	17	17	2	5.67	5.67	0.67
2005	Calgary Roughnecks	16	36	50	86	69	10	5.38	4.31	0.63	1	3	4	7	1	0	7.00	1.00	0.00
2006	Calgary Roughnecks	16	37	54	91	94	4	5.69	5.88	0.25	1	2	7	9	10	0	9.00	10.00	0.00
2007	Calgary Roughnecks	16	50	54	104	98	6	6.50	6.13	0.38	1	1	0	1	1	0	1.00	1.00	0.00
2008	Calgary Roughnecks	12	29	35	64	65	8	5.33	5.42	0.67	–	–	–	–	–	–	–	–	–
2008	Toronto Rock	5	13	15	28	26	2	5.60	5.20	0.40	–	–	–	–	–	–	–	–	–
2009	Toronto Rock	16	34	34	68	68	8	4.25	4.25	0.50	–	–	–	–	–	–	–	–	–
2010	Washington Stealth	16	46	51	97	63	4	6.06	3.94	0.25	3	5	8	13	18	2	4.33	6.00	0.67
2011	Washington Stealth	16	41	51	92	62	2	5.75	3.88	0.13	3	9	8	17	8	2	5.67	2.67	0.67
2012	Washington Stealth	16	36	40	76	65	13	4.75	4.06	0.81	–	–	–	–	–	–	–	–	–
2013	Washington Stealth	16	31	36	67	40	0	4.19	2.50	0.00	3	3	9	12	4	0	4.00	1.33	0.00
2014	Vancouver Stealth	17	23	32	55	42	2	3.24	2.47	0.12	–	–	–	–	–	–	–	–	–
2015	Vancouver Stealth	4	6	9	15	14	0	3.75	3.50	0.00	–	–	–	–	–	–	–	–	–
		196	440	519	959	812	75	4.89	4.14	0.38	16	32	49	81	69	6	5.06	4.31	0.38
Career Total:		212	472	568	1,040	881	81	4.91	4.16	0.38									

GP–Games played; G–Goals; A–Assists; Pts–Points; LB–Loose balls; PIM–Penalty minutes; Pts/GP–Points per games played; LB/GP–Loose balls per games played; PIM/GP–Penalty minutes per games played.

=== Canadian Lacrosse Association ===
			Regular Season					Playoffs
Season	League	Team	GP	G	A	Pts	PIM	GP	G	A	Pts	PIM
1999	BC Jr.A	Victoria Shamrocks	6	10	9	19	10	-	-	-	-	-
2000	BC Jr.A	Victoria Shamrocks	24	38	41	79	20	-	-	-	-	-
2001	BC Jr.A	Victoria Shamrocks	11	17	12	29	12	5	4	1	5	0
2002	BC Jr.A	Victoria Shamrocks	24	66	61	127	30	6	7	12	19	11
2002	WLA	Victoria Shamrocks	2	4	2	6	5	-	-	-	-	-
2003	WLA	Victoria Shamrocks	20	45	40	85	6	14	21	21	42	0
2004	WLA	Victoria Shamrocks	18	47	57	104	0	16	29	31	60	2
2005	WLA	Victoria Shamrocks	11	25	24	49	8	16	26	32	58	2
2006	WLA	Victoria Shamrocks	17	54	46	100	4	16	30	30	60	14
2007	WLA	Victoria Shamrocks	16	47	46	93	8	--	--	--	--	--
2008	WLA	Victoria Shamrocks	11	24	32	56	15	4	5	6	11	2
2009	WLA	Victoria Shamrocks	18	43	73	116	14	5	8	13	21	4
Junior A Totals			65	131	123	254	72	11	11	13	24	11
Senior A Totals			113	289	320	609	60	71	119	133	252	24

== Awards ==
Preceded by Josh Sanderson	Champion's Cup MVP; 2010	Succeeded by Bob Watson
