= Darryl Gibson (lacrosse) =

Canadian lacrosse player

- Born: July 28, 1976 (age 48); Toronto, Ontario, Canada
- Height: 6 ft 1 in (1.85 m)
- Weight: 205 pounds (93 kg)
- Position: Defenseman
- NLL team Former teams: Buffalo Bandits; Chicago Shamrox; Minnesota Swarm; Toronto Rock; Arizona Sting; San Jose Stealth; Albany Attack
- Pro career: 2000–2012
- Nickname: Doctor D

Darryl Gibson (born July 28, 1976 in Toronto, Ontario) is a Canadian lacrosse coach and former professional player. He played for the Albany Attack, Toronto Rock, San Jose Stealth, Arizona Sting, Minnesota Swarm, Chicago Shamrox and Buffalo Bandits the National Lacrosse League. Gibson is now an Assistant Coach for the Albany FireWolves.

Gibson's son Tyson is also a professional lacrosse player currently playing for the Colorado Mammoth.

== Statistics ==
=== NLL ===
Darryl Gibson		Regular Season									Playoffs								
Season	Team	GP	G	A	Pts	LB	PIM	Pts/GP	LB/GP	PIM/GP	GP	G	A	Pts	LB	PIM	Pts/GP	LB/GP	PIM/GP
2000	Albany Attack	11	5	9	14	59	16	1.27	5.36	1.45	–	–	–	–	–	–	–	–	–
2001	Albany Attack	8	3	1	4	37	14	0.50	4.63	1.75	–	–	–	–	–	–	–	–	–
2002	Toronto Rock	15	3	15	18	84	12	1.20	5.60	0.80	2	2	0	2	9	0	1.00	4.50	0.00
2003	Toronto Rock	15	4	6	10	62	12	0.67	4.13	0.80	2	1	1	2	8	4	1.00	4.00	2.00
2004	Toronto Rock	16	6	8	14	62	25	0.88	3.88	1.56	1	0	0	0	6	0	0.00	6.00	0.00
2005	San Jose Stealth	2	0	1	1	0	7	0.50	0.00	3.50	–	–	–	–	–	–	–	–	–
2005	Arizona Sting	14	3	7	10	84	12	0.71	6.00	0.86	3	0	5	5	17	2	1.67	5.67	0.67
2006	Minnesota Swarm	9	0	4	4	41	14	0.44	4.56	1.56	–	–	–	–	–	–	–	–	–
2006	Toronto Rock	3	0	0	0	11	2	0.00	3.67	0.67	1	0	0	0	1	0	0.00	1.00	0.00
2007	Chicago Shamrox	16	4	9	13	57	22	0.81	3.56	1.38	–	–	–	–	–	–	–	–	–
2008	Chicago Shamrox	3	0	0	0	7	9	0.00	2.33	3.00	–	–	–	–	–	–	–	–	–
2010	Buffalo Bandits	11	0	8	8	35	21	0.73	3.18	1.91	1	0	0	0	5	0	0.00	5.00	0.00
2011	Buffalo Bandits	8	0	0	0	24	8	0.00	3.00	1.00	2	0	0	0	3	2	0.00	1.50	1.00
2012	Buffalo Bandits	7	0	5	5	19	21	0.71	2.71	3.00	1	0	0	0	2	2	0.00	2.00	2.00
		138	28	73	101	582	195	0.73	4.22	1.41	13	3	6	9	51	10	0.69	3.92	0.77
Career Total:		151	31	79	110	633	205	0.73	4.19	1.36									

GP–Games played; G–Goals; A–Assists; Pts–Points; LB–Loose balls; PIM–Penalty minutes; Pts/GP–Points per games played; LB/GP–Loose balls per games played; PIM/GP–Penalty minutes per games played.
