= National Lacrosse League Executive of the Year Award =

The Executive of the Year Award is given annually to the National Lacrosse League executive who is chosen as having the most positive impact on his or her team.

== Past winners ==
Season	Winner	Team	Other finalists
2025	Jason Thorne	Vancouver Warriors	Scott Loffler, Buffalo Bandits John Catalano, Halifax Thunderbirds
2024	John Catalano	Halifax Thunderbirds	Mike Hancock, Toronto Rock; Oliver Marti, Albany FireWolves
2023	Mark Fine	Las Vegas Desert Dogs	Melissa Blades, Calgary Roughnecks; Matt Hutchings, Colorado Mammoth
2022	Jamie Dawick	Toronto Rock	Greg Bibb, Panther City Lacrosse Club; Rich Lisk, New York Riptide
2021	Season cancelled		
2020	John Catalano	Halifax Thunderbirds	Matt Hutchings, Colorado Mammoth; Rich Lisk, New England Black Wolves
2019	Terri Giberson	Toronto Rock	Lindsey Masciangelo, Philadelphia Wings; Dave Zygaj, Buffalo Bandits
2018	Matt Hutchings	Colorado Mammoth	Andy Arlotta, Georgia Swarm; Al Ryz, Saskatchewan Rush
2017	Amber Cox	New England Black Wolves	Andy Arlotta, Georgia Swarm; John Catalano, Rochester Knighthawks
2016	Lee Genier	Saskatchewan Rush	Mike French, New England Black Wolves; Scott Loffler, Buffalo Bandits
2015	Bruce Urban	Edmonton Rush	Scott Loffler, Buffalo Bandits; Lewis Staats, Rochester Knighthawks
2014	John Bean	Calgary Roughnecks	Curt Styres, Rochester Knighthawks; Bruce Urban, Edmonton Rush
2013	Jamie Dawick	Toronto Rock	
2012	Andy Arlotta	Minnesota Swarm	
2011	Curt Styres	Rochester Knighthawks	
2010	David Takata	Washington Stealth	
2009	John J. Arlotta	Minnesota Swarm	
2008	Tom Garrity	Minnesota Swarm	
2007	Dave Zygaj	Buffalo Bandits	
2006	Angela Batinovich	Portland LumberJax	
2005	Les Bartley	Toronto Rock	
2004	Steve Govett	Colorado Mammoth	
2003	Brad Bannister	Calgary Roughnecks	
2002	Tom Mayenknecht	Vancouver Ravens	
2001	Russ Cline	Philadelphia Wings	
