= Luke Wiles =

Canadian lacrosse player

Personal information
- Nationality: Canadian
- Born: August 28, 1982 (age 43) Orillia, Ontario
- Height: 5 ft 11 in (180 cm)
- Weight: 200 lb (91 kg; 14 st 4 lb)

Sport
- Position: Forward
- NLL draft: 4th overall, 2005; Philadelphia Wings
- NLL team Former teams: Philadelphia Wings; Buffalo Bandits; Washington Stealth; Toronto Rock; San Jose Stealth; Philadelphia Wings
- WLA team: Victoria Shamrocks
- Pro career: 2006–

Luke Wiles (born August 28, 1982) is a former Canadian lacrosse player who played forward for the Philadelphia Wings of the National Lacrosse League. Wiles was named to the 2006 NLL All-Rookie Team.

== Junior career ==
Wiles had an outstanding junior career over six years with the Orillia Rama Kings and the St. Catharines Athletics. For two straight years (2001–2002), Wiles led the league in scoring. In 2003, he led the Athletics to a Minto Cup National championship, and took home tournament M.V.P honours. He finished his career 404 points in just 108 games, and is currently 53rd all time in Canadian Junior A lacrosse for career goals (regular season and playoffs combined) with 259.

== Statistics ==
=== NLL ===
Luke Wiles		Regular season									Playoffs								
Season	Team	GP	G	A	Pts	LB	PIM	Pts/GP	LB/GP	PIM/GP	GP	G	A	Pts	LB	PIM	Pts/GP	LB/GP	PIM/GP
2006	Philadelphia Wings	8	10	13	23	31	11	2.88	3.88	1.38	–	–	–	–	–	–	–	–	–
2006	San Jose Stealth	9	13	13	26	37	4	2.89	4.11	0.44	–	–	–	–	–	–	–	–	–
2007	San Jose Stealth	16	30	52	82	95	14	5.13	5.94	0.88	2	3	5	8	10	7	4.00	5.00	3.50
2008	San Jose Stealth	11	20	34	54	46	6	4.91	4.18	0.55	–	–	–	–	–	–	–	–	–
2009	Toronto Rock	16	33	36	69	76	8	4.31	4.75	0.50	–	–	–	–	–	–	–	–	–
2010	Washington Stealth	15	24	25	49	41	11	3.27	2.73	0.73	3	4	3	7	14	0	2.33	4.67	0.00
2011	Washington Stealth	16	29	31	60	56	6	3.75	3.50	0.38	3	2	7	9	7	0	3.00	2.33	0.00
2012	Buffalo Bandits	16	39	31	70	71	4	4.38	4.44	0.25	1	1	0	1	1	0	1.00	1.00	0.00
2013	Buffalo Bandits	12	10	11	21	30	10	1.75	2.50	0.83	–	–	–	–	–	–	–	–	–
		119	208	246	454	483	74	3.82	4.06	0.62	9	10	15	25	32	7	2.78	3.56	0.78
Career Total:		128	218	261	479	515	81	3.74	4.02	0.63									

GP–Games played; G–Goals; A–Assists; Pts–Points; LB–Loose balls; PIM–Penalty minutes; Pts/GP–Points per games played; LB/GP–Loose balls per games played; PIM/GP–Penalty minutes per games played.

=== Canadian Lacrosse Association ===
			Regular Season					Playoffs
Season	Team	League	GP	G	A	Pts	PIM	GP	G	A	Pts	PIM
1998	Orillia Rama Kings	OLA Jr.A	17	3	8	11	17	4	2	2	4	0
1999	Orillia Rama Kings	OLA Jr.A	19	40	37	77	12	4	13	1	14	2
2000	Orillia Rama Kings	OLA Jr.A	20	44	39	83	45	--	--	--	--	--
2000	Peterborough Lakers	MSL	6	2	5	7	0	0	0	0	0	0
2001	Orillia Rama Kings	OLA Jr.A	20	54	42	96	78	6	7	14	21	31
2002	Orillia Rama Kings	OLA Jr.A	20	34	47	81	60	7	10	18	28	6
2003	Orillia Rama Kings	OLA Jr.A	7	18	12	30	23	--	--	--	--	--
2003	St. Catharines Athletics	OLA Jr.A	5	12	14	26	4	12	22	42	64	12
Minto Cup	St. Catharines Athletics	CLA	--	--	--	--	--	6	15	12	27	--
2004	Barrie Lakeshores	OLA Sr.B	14	33	28	61	20	7	15	18	33	12
2005	Barrie Lakeshores	MSL	18	32	42	74	29	9	10	19	29	4
2006	Barrie Lakeshores	MSL	18	28	52	80	23	10	13	30	43	10
2007	Barrie Lakeshores	MSL	15	18	39	57	8	4	5	4	9	4
2008	Barrie Lakeshores	MSL	1	0	0	0	0	--	--	--	--	--
2008	Victoria Shamrocks	WLA	5	7	11	18	23	4	5	5	10	11
2009	Victoria Shamrocks	WLA	16	38	37	75	15	5	5	13	18	4
Junior A Totals			108	205	199	404	239	33	54	77	131	51
Minto Cup Totals			--	--	--	--	--	6	15	12	27	--
Senior A Totals			79	125	186	311	98	32	38	71	109	33
Senior B Totals			14	33	28	61	20	7	15	18	33	12
