= 2006 NLL season =

- League: National Lacrosse League
- Sport: Indoor lacrosse
- Duration: December 30, 2005 – May 13, 2006
- Games: 16
- Teams: 11

Regular season
- Season MVP: Steve Dietrich (Buffalo Bandits)
- Top scorer: Josh Sanderson (Toronto Rock)

Playoffs
- Eastern champions: Buffalo Bandits
- Eastern runners-up: Rochester Knighthawks
- Western champions: Portland LumberJax
- Western runners-up: Colorado Mammoth

Champion's Cup
- Champions: Colorado Mammoth (1st title)
- Runners-up: Buffalo Bandits
- Finals MVP: Gavin Prout (Colorado)

NLL seasons
- ← 2005 season 2007 season →

The 2006 National Lacrosse League season was the 20th season in the history of the league, which began as the Eagle Pro Box Lacrosse League in 1987. The season began on December 30, 2005, and concluded with the championship game on May 13, 2006.

The defending champion Toronto Rock were once again the favourite to win the Champions' Cup, but a slow start plus a dismal performance in the semifinal game against Rochester removed the Rock from contention. The Colorado Mammoth, under first-year head coach Gary Gait, won their first title since winning the first ever title in 1987, as the Baltimore Thunder.

Highly touted Portland rookie Brodie Merrill lived up to his hype, winning both the Defensive Player of the Year and the Rookie of the Year awards. Portland continued its domination of the post-season awards with Derek Keenan, himself a former Rookie of the Year Award winner (1992 with Buffalo), winning both the Les Bartley Award for coach of the year and the GM of the Year Award, and owner Angela Batinovich winning the Executive of the Year Award.

== Team movement ==
The season featured the debut of two expansion teams; the Edmonton Rush and the Portland LumberJax, both in the Western Division. Portland beat the expansion team odds and won its division, finishing with an 11–5 record, while Edmonton did not fare so well. The Rush finished the season 1–15, their only win coming at the hands of their provincial rivals, the Calgary Roughnecks.

Before the 2006 season, the Anaheim Storm folded not being able to attract enough fans in their two years in Southern California moving from their original home of New Jersey after the 2003 season where, for two seasons, they were not able to attract enough fans.

=== Teams ===
2006 National Lacrosse League
Division	Team	City	Arena	Capacity
East	Buffalo Bandits	Buffalo, New York	HSBC Arena	18,690
East	Minnesota Swarm	Saint Paul, Minnesota	XCEL Energy Center	18,064
East	Philadelphia Wings	Philadelphia, Pennsylvania	Wachovia Center	19,523
East	Rochester Knighthawks	Rochester, New York	Blue Cross Arena	10,662
East	Toronto Rock	Toronto, Ontario	Air Canada Centre	18,800
West	Arizona Sting	Glendale, Arizona	Glendale Arena	17,125
West	Calgary Roughnecks	Calgary, Alberta	Pengrowth Saddledome	19,289
West	Colorado Mammoth	Denver, Colorado	Pepsi Center	18,007
West	Edmonton Rush	Edmonton, Alberta	Rexall Place	16,839
West	Portland Lumberjax	Portland, Oregon	Rose Garden	18,280
West	San Jose Stealth	San Jose, California	HP Pavilion	17,496

=== Map of teams ===
East Division West Division

== Milestones ==
- February 18: John Tavares tied Gary Gait for the all-time record in points, with 1091, as the Buffalo Bandits defeated the Minnesota Swarm 14–9.
- March 4: Tavares sets a new NLL record for career points, scoring his 1092nd point in an 11–8 loss to the Swarm.

== Final standings ==
=== Regular season ===
East Division
P	Team	GP	W	L	PCT	GB	Home	Road	GF	GA	Diff	GF/GP	GA/GP
1	Buffalo Bandits – xyz	16	11	5	.688	0.0	6–2	5–3	193	167	+26	12.06	10.44
2	Rochester Knighthawks – x	16	9	7	.562	2.0	6–2	3–5	196	180	+16	12.25	11.25
3	Toronto Rock – x	16	8	8	.500	3.0	5–3	3–5	182	179	+3	11.38	11.19
4	Minnesota Swarm – x	16	8	8	.500	3.0	3–5	5–3	158	171	−13	9.88	10.69
5	Philadelphia Wings	16	8	8	.500	3.0	5–3	3–5	184	184	−-0	11.50	11.50

West Division
P	Team	GP	W	L	PCT	GB	Home	Road	GF	GA	Diff	GF/GP	GA/GP
1	Portland LumberJax – xy	16	11	5	.688	0.0	5–3	6–2	188	177	+11	11.75	11.06
2	Colorado Mammoth – x	16	10	6	.625	1.0	6–2	4–4	200	172	+28	12.50	10.75
3	Calgary Roughnecks – x	16	9	7	.562	2.0	4–4	5–3	183	178	+5	11.44	11.12
4	Arizona Sting – x	16	8	8	.500	3.0	4–4	4–4	198	199	−1	12.38	12.44
5	San Jose Stealth	16	5	11	.312	6.0	3–5	2–6	151	174	−23	9.44	10.88
6	Edmonton Rush	16	1	15	.062	10.0	0–8	1–7	150	202	−52	9.38	12.62

x: Clinched playoff berth; c: Clinched playoff berth by crossing over to another division; y: Clinched division; z: Clinched best regular season record; GP: Games Played
W: Wins; L: Losses; GB: Games back; PCT: Win percentage; Home: Record at Home; Road: Record on the Road; GF: Goals scored; GA: Goals allowed
Differential: Difference between goals scored and allowed; GF/GP: Average number of goals scored per game; GA/GP: Average number of goals allowed per game Toronto won the 3-way tiebreaker with Minnesota and Philadelphia

=== Playoffs ===
Divisional Semifinal
1	Buffalo	11
4	Minnesota	10
Eastern Division
3	Toronto	8
2	Rochester	16
1	Portland	10
4	Arizona	14
Western Division
2	Colorado	18
3	Calgary	17

Divisional Final
1	Buffalo	15
2	Rochester	10
2	Colorado	13
4	Arizona	12

Champion's Cup Final
W2	Colorado	16
E1	Buffalo	9

== All-Star game ==
The 2006 All-Star Game was held at the Air Canada Centre in Toronto, Ontario on February 25, 2006. The West Division defeated the East Division 14–13. The MVP of the game was Lewis Ratcliff of the Calgary Roughnecks, who scored 4 goals, including the game winner. This marked the second straight year that a Roughneck player was All-Star Game MVP, with Tracy Kelusky having won it in 2005.

=== All-Star teams ===
Eastern Division starters	Western Division starters
John Grant, Jr., Rochester	Gavin Prout, Colorado
Colin Doyle, Toronto	Tracey Kelusky, Calgary
John Tavares, Buffalo	Craig Conn, Arizona
Steve Toll, Rochester	Jay Jalbert, Colorado
Thomas Hajek, Philadelphia	Brodie Merrill, Portland
Pat O'Toole, Rochester (goalie)	Anthony Cosmo, San Jose (goalie)
Eastern Division Reserves	Western Division Reserves
Marshall Abrams, Rochester	Dan Carey, Colorado
Jake Bergey, Philadelphia	Bruce Codd, Arizona
Ryan Cousins, Minnesota	Jonas Derks, Arizona
Glenn Clark, Philadelphia	Dallas Eliuk, Portland (goalie)
Steve Dietrich, Buffalo (goalie)	Peter Lough, Arizona
Blaine Manning, Toronto	Derek Malawsky, San Jose
Dan Marohl, Philadelphia	Lewis Ratcliff, Calgary
Josh Sanderson, Toronto	Scott Self, Arizona
Phil Sanderson, Toronto	Ryan Sharp, Portland
Mark Steenhuis, Buffalo	Kaleb Toth, Calgary
Shawn Williams, Rochester	Andrew Turner, Edmonton
Jim Veltman, Toronto	Taylor Wray, Calgary

== Awards ==
=== Annual ===
Award	Winner	Team
Jet Blue MVP Award	Steve Dietrich	Buffalo
Edge Active Care Rookie of the Year Award	Brodie Merrill	Portland
Les Bartley Award (Coach of the Year)	Derek Keenan	Portland
GM of the Year Award	Derek Keenan	Portland
Executive of the Year Award	Angela Batinovich	Portland
Defensive Player of the Year	Brodie Merrill	Portland
RBK Goaltender of the Year Award	Steve Dietrich	Buffalo
Bowflex Sportsmanship Award	Sean Greenhalgh	Philadelphia
Championship Game MVP	Gavin Prout	Colorado

=== All-Pro Teams ===
First Team

- Colin Doyle, Toronto
- John Grant, Jr., Rochester
- Brodie Merrill, Portland
- Gavin Prout, Colorado
- Josh Sanderson, Toronto
- Steve Dietrich, Buffalo

Second Team

- Craig Conn, Arizona
- Dan Dawson, Arizona
- Jay Jalbert, Colorado
- Lewis Ratcliff, Calgary
- John Tavares, Buffalo
- Nick Patterson, Minnesota

=== All-Rookie Team ===
- Brodie Merrill, Portland
- Sean Greenhalgh, Philadelphia
- Dan Carey, Colorado
- Jeff Zywicki, San Jose
- Shawn Evans, Rochester
- Luke Wiles, San Jose

=== Weekly awards ===
The NLL gives out awards weekly for the best overall player, best offensive player, best defensive player, and best rookie.

Week	Overall	Offensive	Defensive	Rookie
1	Sean Greenhalgh	Sean Greenhalgh	Matt Roik	Sean Greenhalgh
2	Jonas Derks	Jonas Derks	Chris Levis	Jeff Zywicki
3	Mark Steenhuis	Mark Steenhuis	Steve Dietrich	Shawn Evans
4	Nick Patterson	Jake Bergey	Dallas Eliuk	Brodie Merrill
5	John Grant, Jr.	John Grant, Jr.	Pat O'Toole	Brodie Merrill
6	Craig Conn	Craig Conn	Nick Patterson	Dan Carey
7	Chad Culp	Chad Culp	Nick Patterson	Sean Greenhalgh
8	John Tavares	Brodie Merrill	Pat Campbell	Brodie Merrill
9	Aaron Wilson	Aaron Wilson	Bob Watson	Sean Greenhalgh
10	Matt Disher	John Grant, Jr.	Matt Disher	Shawn Evans
11	Sean Greenhalgh	John Grant, Jr.	Matt King	Jeff Zywicki
12	Jay Jalbert	Ryan Ward	Jeff Zywicki	Jay Jalbert
13	Mark Steenhuis	Mark Steenhuis	Matt King	Roger Vyse; Brodie Merrill (tie)
14	Brodie Merrill	Jay Jalbert	Steve Dietrich	Brodie Merrill
15	Colin Doyle	Colin Doyle	Dallas Eliuk	Sean Greenhalgh
16	Dan Dawson	Dan Dawson	Steve Dietrich	Sean Greenhalgh

=== Monthly awards ===
Awards are also given out monthly for the best overall player and best rookie.

Month	Overall	Rookie
Jan	John Grant, Jr.	Sean Greenhalgh
Feb	Nick Patterson	Brodie Merrill
Mar	Gavin Prout	Brodie Merrill

== Statistics leaders ==
Bold numbers indicate new single-season records. Italics indicate tied single-season records.

Stat	Player	Team	Number
Goals	John Grant, Jr.	Rochester	54
Assists	Josh Sanderson	Toronto	69
Points	Josh Sanderson	Toronto	98
Penalty Minutes	Rob VanBeek	Philadelphia	72
Shots on Goal	John Grant, Jr.	Rochester	**277**
Loose Balls	Jim Veltman	Toronto	**226**
Save Pct	Steve Dietrich	Buffalo	**80.8**
GAA	Steve Dietrich	Buffalo	**9.97**

== Attendance ==
=== Regular season ===
Home team	Home games	Average attendance	Total Attendance
Colorado Mammoth	8	16,543	132,347
Toronto Rock	8	16,538	132,306
Buffalo Bandits	8	12,118	96,946
Philadelphia Wings	8	11,936	95,491
Calgary Roughnecks	8	11,777	94,217
Edmonton Rush	8	10,367	82,938
Rochester Knighthawks	8	9,988	79,906
Minnesota Swarm	8	8,372	66,981
Portland LumberJax	8	8,006	64,055
Arizona Sting	8	6,477	51,820
San Jose Stealth	8	5,608	44,868
**League**	**88**	**10,703**	**941,875**

=== Playoffs ===
Home team	Home games	Average attendance	Total Attendance
Colorado Mammoth	2	12,981	25,963
Buffalo Bandits	3	11,703	35,111
Portland LumberJax	1	10,843	10,843
Rochester Knighthawks	1	7,295	7,295
**League**	**7**	**11,316**	**79,212**

== See also ==
- 2006 in sports
