= Thomas Hajek =

Slovak-Canadian lacrosse player

Personal information
- Nickname: Header or The Captain
- Nationality: Canadian
- Born: February 6, 1978 (age 48) Bratislava, Czechoslovakia
- Height: 5 ft 10 in (178 cm)
- Weight: 185 lb (84 kg; 13 st 3 lb)

Sport
- Position: Defense
- Shoots: Right
- NLL draft: 9th overall, 2003; Philadelphia Wings
- NLL team: Philadelphia Wings
- Former WLA team: Victoria Shamrocks
- Pro career: 2004–

Thomas Hajek (born February 6, 1978) is a Slovak-Canadian lacrosse player from St. Catharines, Ontario, who played for the Philadelphia Wings in the National Lacrosse League. He played Junior lacrosse for the St. Catharines Athletics and Junior hockey for the St. Catharines Falcons.

== Early life and college career ==
Hajek was born in Bratislava, Czechoslovakia. He attended the University of Vermont, where he was captain of the men's hockey team and a three-year letterwinner in men's lacrosse.

== NLL career ==
Hajek was selected 9th overall in the 2003 NLL Entry Draft by the Philadelphia Wings. In 2005, he was named the captain of the Philadelphia Wings and was selected to his first NLL East Division All-Star team. In 2006 and 2007, he was named a starter to the All-Star team.

== Statistics ==
=== NLL ===
		Regular Season						Playoffs
Season	Team	GP	G	A	Pts	LB	PIM	GP	G	A	Pts	LB	PIM
2004	Philadelphia	16	1	2	3	74	55	--	--	--	--	--	--
2005	Philadelphia	16	1	8	9	83	50	--	--	--	--	--	--
2006	Philadelphia	15	2	12	14	105	68	--	--	--	--	--	--
2007	Philadelphia	16	1	4	5	94	53	--	--	--	--	--	--
2008	Philadelphia	14	1	8	9	90	77	1	0	1	1	8	0
2009	Philadelphia	16	0	8	8	94	32	--	--	--	--	--	--
2010	Philadelphia	16	1	3	4	60	44	--	--	--	--	--	--
2011	Boston	7	0	0	0	18	2	1	0	0	0	5	0
2012	Philadelphia	1	0	0	0	0	0	0	0	0	0	0	NLL totals	116	7	45	52	618	381	2	0	1	1	13	0
