= Rob Van Beek =

Canadian lacrosse player

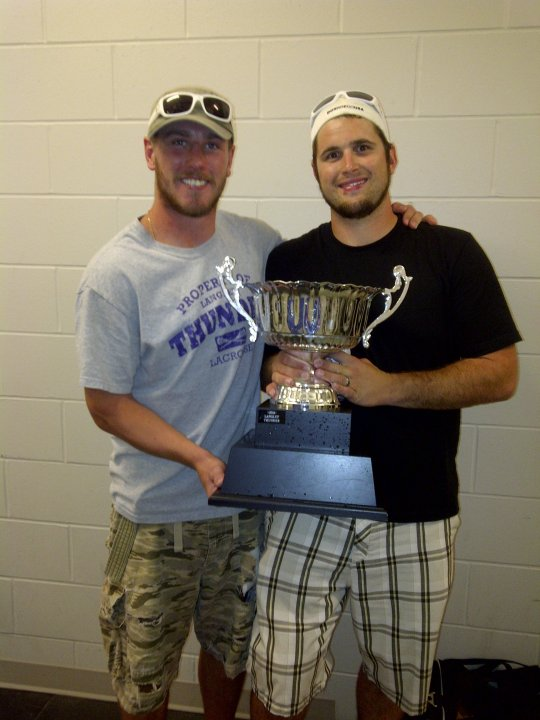

Personal information
- Nickname: Mr. Saturday Night
- Nationality: Canadian
- Born: August 18, 1983 (age 42) Port Coquitlam, British Columbia, Canada
- Height: 5 ft 11 in (180 cm)
- Weight: 205 lb (93 kg; 14 st 9 lb)

Sport
- Position: Forward
- Shoots: Left
- NLL draft: 5th overall, 2004; Philadelphia Wings
- NLL team: Philadelphia Wings
- WLA team: Langley Thunder
- Pro career: 2005–

Rob Van Beek (born August 18, 1983) is a professional indoor lacrosse player. He attended St. Vincent College, and is from Port Coquitlam, British Columbia.

== NLL career ==
Van Beek was selected with the fifth overall pick in the First Round of the 2004 NLL Entry Draft by the Philadelphia Wings.

After missing much of 2005 after tearing his right PCL, Van Beek led the entire NLL in penalty minutes during the 2006 season. In November 2009, Van Beek was traded to the Calgary Roughnecks.

He is a frequent guest on the Preston and Steve morning radio show on 93.3 FM WMMR in Philadelphia to discuss the Philadelphia Wings.

In Spring of 2009, Van Beek was a voluntary assistant lacrosse coach for the Potsdam State Bears. In 2009-10, Van Beek was a coach of Langley Thunder U14 Field Lacrosse Team.

He is a member of the Langley Thunder's 20th Anniversary Squad.

== BCLA / WLA career ==
Van Beek was named league MVP and was also named to the All-Star team in 2003 and 2004 while playing Jr. A lacrosse in the British Columbia Lacrosse Association with the Port Coquitlam Saints.

He was selected 1st overall in the 2005 Western Lacrosse Association draft by the Langley Thunder.

In 2008, Van Beek played for St Regis Indians of OLA Major Lacrosse Series.

In 2009, Van Beek played for Langley Thunder of WLA placed on WLA 2nd All-Star Team.

While playing for the Langley Thunder on August 27, 2011, the team won the Western Lacrosse Association Championship for the first time in franchise history. Van Beek is expected to play in the national Mann Cup that will be held in September 2011 at the Langley Events Centre.

== Statistics ==
=== NLL ===
		Regular Season						Playoffs
Season	Team	GP	G	A	Pts	LB	PIM	GP	G	A	Pts	LB	PIM
2005	Philadelphia	9	1	7	8	59	29	-	-	-	-	-	-
2006	Philadelphia	16	7	19	26	110	72	-	-	-	-	-	-
2007	Philadelphia	16	2	14	16	101	22	-	-	-	-	-	-
2008	Philadelphia	15	8	9	17	96	46	1	1	0	1	6	0
2009	Philadelphia	16	4	10	14	83	11	-	-	-	-	-	-
NLL totals		72	22	59	81	449	180	1	1	0	1	6	0
