= Dan Carey (lacrosse) =

Canadian professional lacrosse player and manager (born 1982)

Personal information
- Born: April 23, 1982 (age 44) Peterborough, Ontario, Canada
- Height: 5 ft 11 in (180 cm)
- Weight: 180 lb (82 kg; 12 st 12 lb)

Sport
- Position: Forward
- Shoots: Left
- NLL draft: 7th overall, 2005; Colorado Mammoth
- NLL teams: Toronto Rock; Colorado Mammoth
- Pro career: 2006–2012

Dan Carey (born April 23, 1982) is a Canadian former professional box lacrosse player and current general manager and vice-president of lacrosse operations of the Rochester Knighthawks of the National Lacrosse League. Carey previously served as the general manager of the Colorado Mammoth.

== Career ==
Carey played six seasons in the National Lacrosse League for both the Colorado Mammoth and the Toronto Rock. Carey was selected in the first round (seventh overall) by the Mammoth in the 2005 NLL Entry Draft after playing one season at Canisius College. Carey played three full seasons and part of a fourth before a concussion during a Major Series Lacrosse game forced him to miss part of the 2009 and all of the 2010 NLL seasons. Carey returned to the Mammoth during the 2011 season, scoring 13 goals and 22 assists in 12 games.

In July 2011, Carey was traded to the Toronto Rock for Creighton Reid and Mat McLeod. After one season in Toronto, during which he scored 25 points in 12 games, Carey announced his retirement due to a second concussion suffered near the end of the 2012 season.

In 2006, as a member of the Peterborough Lakers, Carey was awarded the Mike Kelly Memorial Trophy as most valuable player in the Mann Cup competition.

== Personal life ==
Carey is married to Lisa Foligno, the daughter of former NHL player Mike Foligno and the sister of current NHL players Nick Foligno and Marcus Foligno.

== Statistics ==
=== NLL ===
Dan Carey		Regular season									Playoffs								
Season	Team	GP	G	A	Pts	LB	PIM	Pts/GP	LB/GP	PIM/GP	GP	G	A	Pts	LB	PIM	Pts/GP	LB/GP	PIM/GP
2006	Colorado Mammoth	16	17	45	62	80	2	3.88	5.00	0.13	3	4	4	8	12	0	2.67	4.00	0.00
2007	Colorado Mammoth	16	32	44	76	75	9	4.75	4.69	0.56	1	2	0	2	4	2	2.00	4.00	2.00
2008	Colorado Mammoth	11	22	27	49	68	0	4.45	6.18	0.00	–	–	–	–	–	–	–	–	–
2009	Colorado Mammoth	5	5	9	14	27	0	2.80	5.40	0.00	1	0	3	3	7	0	3.00	7.00	0.00
2011	Colorado Mammoth	12	13	22	35	26	0	2.92	2.17	0.00	1	0	2	2	0	2	2.00	0.00	2.00
2012	Toronto Rock	12	14	11	25	24	4	2.08	2.00	0.33	–	–	–	–	–	–	–	–	–
		72	103	158	261	300	15	3.63	4.17	0.21	6	6	9	15	23	4	2.50	3.83	0.67
Career Total:		78	109	167	276	323	19	3.54	4.14	0.24									

GP–Games played; G–Goals; A–Assists; Pts–Points; LB–Loose balls; PIM–Penalty minutes; Pts/GP–Points per games played; LB/GP–Loose balls per games played; PIM/GP–Penalty minutes per games played.

== Awards ==
Preceded by Tracey Kelusky	NLL Sportsmanship Award; 2008	Succeeded by Dan Dawson
