= Jamey Bowen =

Canadian lacrosse player

Personal information
- Born: November 8, 1969 (age 56) Edmonton, Alberta, Canada
- Height: 6 ft 0 in (183 cm)
- Weight: 210 lb (95 kg; 15 st 0 lb)

Sport
- Position: Forward
- Shoots: Right
- NLL team Former teams: Edmonton Rush; Vancouver Ravens

Jamey Bowen (born November 8, 1969, in Edmonton, Alberta) is a former lacrosse player who played for the Edmonton Rush in the National Lacrosse League. He also teaches at St. Francis Xavier Composite High School in Edmonton, Alberta.

He is the co-founder of Apex Sports Club, also in Edmonton, and is the current president of the club.

== Statistics ==
=== NLL ===
		Regular Season						Playoffs
Season	Team	GP	G	A	Pts	LB	PIM	GP	G	A	Pts	LB	PIM
2002	Vancouver	13	20	42	62	35	0	1	1	4	5	0	0
2006	Edmonton	14	19	24	43	44	6	--	--	--	--	--	--
2007	Edmonton	4	2	9	11	9	0	--	--	--	--	--	--
NLL totals		31	41	75	116	88	6	1	1	4	5	0	0
