= Ryan Avery =

Canadian lacrosse player

Personal information
- Born: June 27, 1982 (age 43) Hamilton, Ontario, CAN
- Height: 6 ft 1 in (185 cm)
- Weight: 215 lb (98 kg; 15 st 5 lb)

Sport
- Position: Goalie
- Shoots: Left
- NLL teams: Buffalo Bandits; Calgary Roughnecks
- Pro career: 2006–2008

Ryan Avery (born June 27, 1982) is a Canadian former professional indoor lacrosse goaltender. He was born in Hamilton, Ontario, and played for the Buffalo Bandits and Calgary Roughnecks in the National Lacrosse League.

Avery participated in a Guinness world record-setting longest lacrosse game that lasted 24 hours, helping raise money for Right To Play.
