= Jason Henhawk =

Canadian lacrosse player

Jason Henhawk (born September 18, 1980, in Niagara Falls, Ontario) is a First Nation lacrosse player who played for the Rochester Knighthawks, a professional box lacrosse team in the North Division of the National Lacrosse League of the United States. At 16, he became the youngest man to play in the National Lacrosse League, in 1998.

== Professional career ==
On August 25, 2008, Jason Henhawk signed a three-year agreement with Knighthawks.

In 2006, Henhawk took part in the National Lacrosse League playing for Toronto Rock. Later, in 2009, he played his sixth season in the same league. During the game Henhawk injured his left leg in fight for loose ball and was removed with an ambulance.

In his nine-season Jason competed with Buffalo, Montreal, Albany, Toronto and Columbus, the 6–0, 215-pound forward scored seven goals and added five 12 point assists. Henhawk faced less success during his first year, getting four goals and one assist, in 1998, in the league with the Buffalo Bandits.

He closed the 2008 Six Nations season with capturing 19 points (10+9) in 12 appearances. Henhawk performed his Junior "A" lacrosse with the Six Nations Arrows and was honored with the Jack Bionda Memorial Award.
