= Mike Hominuck =

Canadian lacrosse player

Personal information
- Born: May 4, 1981 (age 45) Welland, Ontario, Canada
- Height: 5 ft 10 in (178 cm)
- Weight: 170 lb (77 kg; 12 st 2 lb)

Sport
- Position: Forward
- Shoots: Left
- NLL draft: 36th overall, 2001; Philadelphia Wings
- NLL team Former teams: Philadelphia Wings; Edmonton Rush; Minnesota Swarm; Portland LumberJax; Buffalo Bandits; Toronto Rock
- MSL team: Brampton Excelsiors
- Pro career: 2004–

Mike Hominuck (born May 4, 1981 in Welland, Ontario) is a former lacrosse player for the National Lacrosse League. On September 7, 2011, Hominuck signed with the Philadelphia Wings. He played for the Welland Cougars Jr. B hockey club. He is currently a Teacher at Holy Name Catholic Elementary School in Welland, Ontario, Canada. In 2013, he announced his retirement.

== Statistics ==
=== NLL ===
Mike Hominuck		Regular season									Playoffs								
Season	Team	GP	G	A	Pts	LB	PIM	Pts/GP	LB/GP	PIM/GP	GP	G	A	Pts	LB	PIM	Pts/GP	LB/GP	PIM/GP
2004	Buffalo Bandits	2	1	1	2	11	0	1.00	5.50	0.00	–	–	–	–	–	–	–	–	–
2005	Buffalo Bandits	8	5	7	12	36	2	1.50	4.50	0.25	–	–	–	–	–	–	–	–	–
2006	Portland LumberJax	15	28	25	53	68	8	3.53	4.53	0.53	1	4	1	5	6	0	5.00	6.00	0.00
2007	Portland LumberJax	6	6	18	24	39	0	4.00	6.50	0.00	–	–	–	–	–	–	–	–	–
2007	Minnesota Swarm	6	12	16	28	25	2	4.67	4.17	0.33	–	–	–	–	–	–	–	–	–
2008	Minnesota Swarm	7	5	16	21	35	2	3.00	5.00	0.29	–	–	–	–	–	–	–	–	–
2008	Edmonton Rush	9	16	17	33	41	2	3.67	4.56	0.22	–	–	–	–	–	–	–	–	–
2009	Edmonton Rush	13	15	32	47	47	6	3.62	3.62	0.46	–	–	–	–	–	–	–	–	–
2010	Toronto Rock	9	11	9	20	32	22	2.22	3.56	2.44	3	2	4	6	18	0	2.00	6.00	0.00
2012	Philadelphia Wings	15	14	36	50	72	4	3.33	4.80	0.27	1	1	2	3	7	0	3.00	7.00	0.00
2013	Buffalo Bandits	12	14	7	21	48	6	1.75	4.00	0.50	–	–	–	–	–	–	–	–	–
		102	127	184	311	454	54	3.05	4.45	0.53	5	7	7	14	31	0	2.80	6.20	0.00
Career Total:		107	134	191	325	485	54	3.04	4.53	0.50									

GP–Games played; G–Goals; A–Assists; Pts–Points; LB–Loose balls; PIM–Penalty minutes; Pts/GP–Points per games played; LB/GP–Loose balls per games played; PIM/GP–Penalty minutes per games played.
