= Angela Batinovich =

American businesswoman

Angela Batinovich (born c. 1980) is an American businesswoman, notable for being the youngest owner of a professional U.S. sports team. She is the creator of "Bat's Daughter", a line of women's clothing. Her father, Robert Batinovich, is a successful real estate investor and manager. She attended Notre Dame High School which is located in Belmont, California. She earned a degree from Loyola Marymount University in Los Angeles.

From 2005 to 2009, she was the majority shareholder and managing partner of the Portland LumberJax franchise of the National Lacrosse League. The LumberJax were successful on the floor, reaching the playoffs in three of the four seasons including a trip to the Championship game in 2008, but failed to draw sufficient crowds in Portland. The team folded after the 2009 season.

Batinovich, at 24 years old, was the youngest owner in major professional sports. On May 8, 2006, she was named the NLL Executive of the Year.
