= San Jose Stealth =

Former NLL professional box lacrosse team

- Sport: Box lacrosse
- First season: 2004
- Last season: 2009
- League: National Lacrosse League
- Division: Western Division
- Team history: Albany Attack (2000–2003)
- Based in: San Jose, California
- Arena: SAP Center
- Colors: Red, Black, Silver
- Division titles: 1 (2008)

The San Jose Stealth were a member of the National Lacrosse League, the professional box lacrosse league of North America from 2004 until 2009. They played at the HP Pavilion at San Jose, which is also the home of the NHL's San Jose Sharks and the AFL's San Jose SaberCats. They relocated to San Jose, California in 2003, beginning play in the 2004 NLL season. They had previously been the Albany Attack from 2000 to 2003.

On June 17, 2009, the Stealth announced they were moving to Everett, Washington effective immediately, where they would be known as the Washington Stealth. In 2014 they moved to Vancouver and are currently playing as the Vancouver Warriors.

== Awards and honors ==
Year	Player	Award
2005	Ryan Boyle	Rookie of the Year
2007	Anthony Cosmo	Goaltender of the Year

== All time record ==
Season	Division	W-L	Finish	Home	Road	GF	GA	Coach	Playoffs
2004	Western	11–5	2nd	7–1	4–4	204	201	Johnny Mouradian	Lost in division semifinals
2005	Western	4–12	6th	2–6	2–6	170	197	Johnny Mouradian	Missed playoffs
2006	Western	5–11	5th	3–5	2–6	151	174	Walt Christianson	Missed playoffs
2007	Western	9–7	4th	4–4	5–3	181	170	Walt Christianson	Lost in division finals
2008	Western	9–7	1st	4–4	5–3	185	172	Walt Christianson	Lost in division semifinals
2009	Western	7–9	3rd	5–3	2–6	200	185	Chris Hall	Lost in division finals
Total	6 seasons	45–51		25–23	20–28	1091	1099		
Playoff totals	4 appearances	2–4		0–2	2–2	77	89		

== Playoff results ==
Season	Game	Visiting	Home
2004	Division Semifinal	Calgary 15	San Jose 14
2007	Division Semifinal	San Jose 15 (OT)	Colorado 14
2007	Division Final	San Jose 7	Arizona 9
2008	Division Semifinal	Portland 18	San Jose 16
2009	Division Semifinal	San Jose 20	Portland 16
2009	Division Final	San Jose 5	Calgary 17

== See also ==
- Lacrosse
- San Jose Stealth seasons
