= 2011 Minnesota Swarm season =

2011 Minnesota Swarm
- League: NLL
- Division: 2nd West
- 2011 record: 8-8
- Home record: 5-3
- Road record: 3-5
- Goals for: 187
- Goals against: 180
- General Manager: Marty O'Neill
- Coach: Mike Lines
- Captain: Ryan Cousins
- Arena: Xcel Energy Center

Team leaders
- Goals: Ryan Benesch (46)
- Assists: Ryan Benesch (49)
- Points: Ryan Benesch (95)
- Penalties in minutes: Rory Smith (47)
- Loose Balls: Andrew Suitor (108)
- Wins: Nick Patterson (7)
- Goals against average: Nick Patterson (11.08)

The 2011 Minnesota Swarm season was the seventh season of the Minnesota Swarm, a lacrosse team based in Saint Paul, Minnesota playing in the National Lacrosse League.

== Standings ==
East Division
P	Team	GP	W	L	PCT	GB	Home	Road	GF	GA	Diff	GF/GP	GA/GP
1	Buffalo Bandits – xy	16	10	6	.625	0.0	4–4	6–2	169	159	+10	10.56	9.94
2	Toronto Rock – x	16	10	6	.625	0.0	7–1	3–5	187	168	+19	11.69	10.50
3	Rochester Knighthawks – x	16	10	6	.625	0.0	4–4	6–2	176	159	+17	11.00	9.94
4	Boston Blazers – x	16	8	8	.500	2.0	4–4	4–4	166	155	+11	10.38	9.69
5	Philadelphia Wings	16	5	11	.312	5.0	2–6	3–5	143	179	−36	8.94	11.19

West Division
P	Team	GP	W	L	PCT	GB	Home	Road	GF	GA	Diff	GF/GP	GA/GP
1	Calgary Roughnecks – xyz	16	11	5	.688	0.0	6–2	5–3	198	181	+17	12.38	11.31
2	Minnesota Swarm – x	16	8	8	.500	3.0	5–3	3–5	187	180	+7	11.69	11.25
3	Washington Stealth – x	16	8	8	.500	3.0	3–5	5–3	203	198	+5	12.69	12.38
4	Colorado Mammoth – x	16	5	11	.312	6.0	3–5	2–6	151	172	−21	9.44	10.75
5	Edmonton Rush	16	5	11	.312	6.0	4–4	1–7	175	204	−29	10.94	12.75

x: Clinched playoff berth; c: Clinched playoff berth by crossing over to another division; y: Clinched division; z: Clinched best regular season record; GP: Games Played
W: Wins; L: Losses; GB: Games back; PCT: Win percentage; Home: Record at Home; Road: Record on the Road; GF: Goals scored; GA: Goals allowed
Differential: Difference between goals scored and allowed; GF/GP: Average number of goals scored per game; GA/GP: Average number of goals allowed per game

=== Game log ===
Game	Date	Opponent	Location	Score	OT	Attendance	Record
1	January 8, 2011	Rochester Knighthawks	Xcel Energy Center	L 10–11	OT	8,242	0–1
2	January 14, 2011	@ Washington Stealth	Comcast Arena at Everett	W 16–8		3,362	1–1
3	January 22, 2011	Edmonton Rush	Xcel Energy Center	W 9–8		7,042	2–1
4	January 29, 2011	Washington Stealth	Xcel Energy Center	W 11–10	OT	8,911	3–1
5	February 4, 2011	@ Buffalo Bandits	HSBC Arena	L 12–15		15,001	3–2
6	February 12, 2011	@ Rochester Knighthawks	Blue Cross Arena	L 10–12		4,940	3–3
7	February 19, 2011	Boston Blazers	Xcel Energy Center	L 11–14		7,051	3–4
8	February 20, 2011	@ Colorado Mammoth	Pepsi Center	W 12–10		15,825	4–4
9	March 4, 2011	@ Colorado Mammoth	Pepsi Center	W 11–10	OT	13,957	5–4
10	March 25, 2011	@ Edmonton Rush	Rexall Place	L 13–14		7,035	5–5
11	March 27, 2011	Buffalo Bandits	Xcel Energy Center	L 9–12		9,294	5–6
12	April 1, 2011	@ Calgary Roughnecks	Scotiabank Saddledome	L 12–15		10,486	5–7
13	April 2, 2011	Calgary Roughnecks	Xcel Energy Center	W 13–8		6,504	6–7
14	April 9, 2011	@ Washington Stealth	Comcast Arena at Everett	L 15–16	OT	4,864	6–8
15	April 16, 2011	Philadelphia Wings	Xcel Energy Center	W 11–8		9,635	7–8
16	April 23, 2011	Colorado Mammoth	Xcel Energy Center	W 12–8		9,623	8–8

== Playoffs ==
=== Game log ===
Game	Date	Opponent	Location	Score	OT	Attendance	Record
Division Semifinal	April 30, 2011	Washington Stealth	Xcel Energy Center	L 8–14		5,878	0–1

== Roster ==
2011 Minnesota Swarm roster
Active (21-man) roster		Inactive roster	Coaches
Goaltenders: 93 (Canada) Nick Patterson; (Canada) Tyler Carlson; (Canada) Drew Dickie; Defensemen: 4 (United States) Joe Cinosky; 12 (Canada) Eric Pacey (A); 16 (Canada) Noah Talbot; 23 (Canada) Jon Sullivan; 24 (Canada) Rory Smith; 34 (Canada) Nick Inch; 85 (United States) Matt Kelly; (Canada) Nik Bilic; (Canada) Kiel Donahue; (Canada) Ben Salo	Forwards: 7 (Canada) John McClure; 16 (Canada) Jamie Shewchuk; 17 (Canada) Sean Pollock; 21 (Canada) Ryan Benesch; 27 (Canada) Mat Giles (A); 71 (Canada) Kevin Ross; 98 (Canada) Callum Crawford; (Canada) Joel Henry; (Canada) Sean Robinson; (Canada) Pat Saunders; Transition: 9 (Canada) Tyler Hass; 11 (Canada) Rich Morgan; 15 (Canada) Shayne Bennett; 20 (Canada) Andrew Suitor; 22 (Canada) Andrew Watt		Head coach {{{Head Coach}}} Legend: * Suspended list; (C) Captain; (A) Alternate captain; Roster updated 2011-07-06; NLL Transactions

== See also ==
- 2011 NLL season
