= 2012 Minnesota Swarm season =

2012 Minnesota Swarm
- League: NLL
- Division: 3rd West
- 2012 record: 9-7
- Home record: 6-2
- Road record: 3-5
- Goals for: 202
- Goals against: 190
- General Manager: Joe Sullivan
- Coach: Joe Sullivan
- Captain: Andrew Suitor
- Arena: Xcel Energy Center

Team leaders
- Goals: Ryan Benesch (33)
- Assists: Callum Crawford (58)
- Points: Callum Crawford (83)
- Penalties in minutes: Andrew Suitor (74)
- Loose Balls: Jordan MacIntosh (153)
- Wins: Tyler Carlson (5)
- Goals against average: Evan Kirk (9.81)

The 2012 Minnesota Swarm season was the eighth season of the Minnesota Swarm, a lacrosse team based in Saint Paul, Minnesota playing in the National Lacrosse League.

After a 3–3 start, the Swarm fired coach Mike Lines, naming Associate General Manager Joe Sullivan as the new head coach. No reason was given for the move.

== Regular season ==
=== Conference standings ===
East Division
P	Team	GP	W	L	PCT	GB	Home	Road	GF	GA	Diff	GF/GP	GA/GP
1	Toronto Rock – xy	16	9	7	.562	0.0	3–5	6–2	198	196	+2	12.38	12.25
2	Rochester Knighthawks – x	16	7	9	.438	2.0	5–3	2–6	191	197	−6	11.94	12.31
3	Philadelphia Wings – x	16	7	9	.438	2.0	3–5	4–4	176	207	−31	11.00	12.94
4	Buffalo Bandits – x	16	7	9	.438	2.0	4–4	3–5	198	204	−6	12.38	12.75

West Division
P	Team	GP	W	L	PCT	GB	Home	Road	GF	GA	Diff	GF/GP	GA/GP
1	Calgary Roughnecks – xyz	16	12	4	.750	0.0	5–3	7–1	216	170	+46	13.50	10.62
2	Colorado Mammoth – x	16	11	5	.688	1.0	5–3	6–2	217	201	+16	13.56	12.56
3	Minnesota Swarm – x	16	9	7	.562	3.0	6–2	3–5	202	190	+12	12.62	11.88
4	Edmonton Rush – x	16	6	10	.375	6.0	4–4	2–6	167	175	−8	10.44	10.94
5	Washington Stealth	16	4	12	.250	8.0	2–6	2–6	179	204	−25	11.19	12.75

x: Clinched playoff berth; c: Clinched playoff berth by crossing over to another division; y: Clinched division; z: Clinched best regular season record; GP: Games Played
W: Wins; L: Losses; GB: Games back; PCT: Win percentage; Home: Record at Home; Road: Record on the Road; GF: Goals scored; GA: Goals allowed
Differential: Difference between goals scored and allowed; GF/GP: Average number of goals scored per game; GA/GP: Average number of goals allowed per game

=== Game log ===
Game	Date	Opponent	Location	Score	OT	Attendance	Record
1	January 14, 2012	@ Colorado Mammoth	Pepsi Center	L 14–20		14,106	0–1
2	January 28, 2012	Buffalo Bandits	Xcel Energy Center	W 19–11		8,232	1–1
3	February 4, 2012	@ Rochester Knighthawks	Blue Cross Arena	L 14–16		5,267	1–2
4	February 10, 2012	Edmonton Rush	Xcel Energy Center	W 10–9	OT	7,012	2–2
5	February 12, 2012	Rochester Knighthawks	Xcel Energy Center	W 9–6		7,087	3–2
6	February 18, 2012	Colorado Mammoth	Xcel Energy Center	L 7–12		9,030	3–3
7	February 24, 2012	@ Washington Stealth	Comcast Arena at Everett	W 15–7		3,755	4–3
8	March 3, 2012	@ Calgary Roughnecks	Scotiabank Saddledome	W 15–11		7,638	5–3
9	March 17, 2012	@ Buffalo Bandits	First Niagara Center	L 10–13		15,003	5–4
10	March 25, 2012	@ Washington Stealth	Comcast Arena at Everett	L 13–20		3,618	5–5
11	March 30, 2012	Calgary Roughnecks	Xcel Energy Center	L 10–15		8,510	5–6
12	March 31, 2012	@ Edmonton Rush	Rexall Place	L 8–9	OT	6,011	5–7
13	April 6, 2012	@ Philadelphia Wings	Wells Fargo Center	W 13–9		8,070	6–7
14	April 14, 2012	Washington Stealth	Xcel Energy Center	W 14–9		8,239	7–7
15	April 21, 2012	Philadelphia Wings	Xcel Energy Center	W 15–10		9,357	8–7
16	April 28, 2012	Colorado Mammoth	Xcel Energy Center	W 16–13		11,297	9–7

== Playoffs ==
=== Game log ===
Game	Date	Opponent	Location	Score	OT	Attendance	Record
Division Semifinal	May 5, 2012	@ Colorado Mammoth	Pepsi Center	W 14–10		14,152	1–0
Division Final	May 12, 2012	Edmonton Rush	Xcel Energy Center	L 3–15		6,491	1–1

== Transactions ==
=== Trades ===
July 13, 2011	To Minnesota Swarm 1st round pick in 2011 Entry Draft; 4th round pick in 2011 Entry Draft; 2nd round pick in 2012 Entry Draft	To Edmonton Rush Aaron Wilson; Ryan Cousins; Kevin Croswell; 2nd round pick in 2011 Entry Draft
September 6, 2011	To Minnesota Swarm 1st round pick in Boston Blazers dispersal draft (Anthony Cosmo)	To Colorado Mammoth Jon Sullivan; Rory Smith; Sean Pollock
September 9, 2011	To Minnesota Swarm 1st round pick in Boston Blazers dispersal draft (Greg Downing); 2nd round pick in 2011 Entry Draft; 1st round pick in 2012 Entry Draft; Jeff Gilbert	To Toronto Rock Josh Sanderson; Nick Inch
October 25, 2011	To Minnesota Swarm 4th round pick in 2013 entry draft	To Buffalo Bandits Mat Giles
February 16, 2012	To Minnesota Swarm 1st round pick in 2013 entry draft 1st round pick in 2014 entry draft	To Buffalo Bandits Anthony Cosmo
March 20, 2012	To Minnesota Swarm 3rd round pick in 2013 entry draft	To Colorado Mammoth Jamie Shewchuk

=== Dispersal Draft ===
The Swarm chose the following players in the Boston Blazers dispersal draft:

Round	Overall	Player
1	3	Anthony Cosmo
1	4	Josh Sanderson
2	13	Mitch Belisle
3	22	Jason Duboe
4	30	Tyler Collins

=== Entry draft ===
The 2011 NLL Entry Draft took place on September 21, 2011. The Swarm selected the following players:

Round	Overall	Player	College/Club
1	4	Jordan MacIntosh	Rochester Institute of Technology
1	6	Evan Kirk	Hobart College
2	12	Corbyn Tao	Robert Morris University
3	19	Jay Card	Hofstra University
3	27	David Earl	Notre Dame University
4	29	Brian Karalunas	Villanova University
4	31	Patrick Smith	Robert Morris
5	39	Jeremy Boltus	Army
6	48	Todd Baxter	Denver University

== Roster ==
2012 Minnesota Swarm roster
Active (21-man) roster		Inactive roster	Coaches
Goaltenders: 30 (Canada) Tyler Carlson; 35 (Canada) Evan Kirk; Defensemen: 39 (Canada) Dan Ball; 85 (United States) Mitch Belisle; 79 (Canada) Nik Bilic; 4 (United States) Joe Cinosky; 23 (Canada) Brendon Doran; 43 (Canada) Jeff Gilbert; 13 (United States) Matt Kelly	Forwards: 42 (United States) Todd Baxter; 21 (Canada) Ryan Benesch; 77 (Canada) Jay Card; 98 (Canada) Callum Crawford; 94 (Canada) Joel Henry; 7 (Canada) John McClure; 71 (Canada) Kevin Ross]; 84 (Canada) Corbyn Tao; Transition: 8 (United States) Greg Downing; 33 (Canada) David Earl; 9 (Canada) Tyler Hass; 24 (Canada) Jordan MacIntosh; 11 (Canada) Rich Morgan; 20 (Canada) Andrew Suitor (C); 22 (Canada) Andrew Watt	Practice squad: 27 (United States) Pat Smith; 25 (Canada) Joe Wasson	Head coach: Joe Sullivan; Assistant coaches: Aime Caines; Bob Keast; Legend: * Suspended list; (C) Captain; (A) Alternate captain; Roster updated 2011-11-29; NLL Transactions

== See also ==
- 2012 NLL season
