= 2010 Minnesota Swarm season =

2010 Minnesota Swarm
- League: NLL
- Division: 4th West
- 2010 record: 5-11
- Home record: 3-5
- Road record: 2-6
- Goals for: 189
- Goals against: 201
- General Manager: Marty O'Neill
- Coach: Duane Jacobs
- Captain: Ryan Cousins
- Alternate captains: Ryan Ward
- Arena: Xcel Energy Center
- Average attendance: 8,288

Team leaders
- Goals: Aaron Wilson (40)
- Assists: Callum Crawford (64)
- Points: Callum Crawford (96)
- Penalties in minutes: Sean Pollock (46)
- Loose Balls: Jay Thorimbert (152)
- Wins: Nick Patterson (4)
- Goals against average: Kevin Croswell (12.21)

The Minnesota Swarm are a lacrosse team based in Saint Paul, Minnesota playing in the National Lacrosse League (NLL). The 2010 season was the 6th in franchise history.

The Swarm didn't have a strong start to the 2010 season, losing four of their first five games. But after winning four of their next five to even their record at 5-5, they lost their last six games of the season, three of them in overtime, to finish with a 5-11 record. Despite the .313 winning percentage, the Swarm made the playoffs ahead of the 4-12 Colorado Mammoth. But in the playoffs, their losing streak continued, as the eventual champion Washington Stealth eliminated them with a 14-10 victory.

== Regular season ==
=== Conference standings ===
East Division
P	Team	GP	W	L	PCT	GB	Home	Road	GF	GA	Diff	GF/GP	GA/GP
1	Orlando Titans – xy	16	11	5	.688	0.0	5–3	6–2	172	154	+18	10.75	9.62
2	Toronto Rock – x	16	9	7	.562	2.0	6–2	3–5	197	156	+41	12.31	9.75
3	Buffalo Bandits – x	16	8	8	.500	3.0	4–4	4–4	169	170	−1	10.56	10.62
4	Boston Blazers – x	16	8	8	.500	3.0	5–3	3–5	161	162	−1	10.06	10.12
5	Rochester Knighthawks	16	7	9	.438	4.0	4–4	3–5	155	181	−26	9.69	11.31
6	Philadelphia Wings	16	5	11	.312	6.0	3–5	2–6	168	194	−26	10.50	12.12

West Division
P	Team	GP	W	L	PCT	GB	Home	Road	GF	GA	Diff	GF/GP	GA/GP
1	Washington Stealth – xyz	16	11	5	.688	0.0	6–2	5–3	211	179	+32	13.19	11.19
2	Calgary Roughnecks – x	16	10	6	.625	1.0	5–3	5–3	193	169	+24	12.06	10.56
3	Edmonton Rush – x	16	10	6	.625	1.0	5–3	5–3	186	201	−15	11.62	12.56
4	Minnesota Swarm – x	16	5	11	.312	6.0	3–5	2–6	189	201	−12	11.81	12.56
5	Colorado Mammoth	16	4	12	.250	7.0	0–8	4–4	167	201	−34	10.44	12.56

x: Clinched playoff berth; c: Clinched playoff berth by crossing over to another division; y: Clinched division; z: Clinched best regular season record; GP: Games Played
W: Wins; L: Losses; GB: Games back; PCT: Win percentage; Home: Record at Home; Road: Record on the Road; GF: Goals scored; GA: Goals allowed
Differential: Difference between goals scored and allowed; GF/GP: Average number of goals scored per game; GA/GP: Average number of goals allowed per game

=== Game log ===
Game	Date	Opponent	Location	Score	OT	Attendance	Record
1	January 10, 2010	@ Calgary Roughnecks	Pengrowth Saddledome	L 7–12		8,112	0–1
2	January 15, 2010	Calgary Roughnecks	Xcel Energy Center	W 12–10		11,758	1–1
3	January 22, 2010	Colorado Mammoth	Xcel Energy Center	L 14–15	OT	8,648	1–2
4	January 30, 2010	@ Buffalo Bandits	HSBC Arena	L 7–11		15,636	1–3
5	February 5, 2010	@ Washington Stealth	Comcast Arena at Everett	L 9–12		3,526	1–4
6	February 13, 2010	Washington Stealth	Xcel Energy Center	W 16–12		8,952	2–4
7	February 20, 2010	Colorado Mammoth	Xcel Energy Center	W 15–5		9,223	3–4
8	February 27, 2010	@ Colorado Mammoth	Pepsi Center	W 13–12		15,427	4–4
9	March 13, 2010	@ Philadelphia Wings	Wachovia Center	L 11–20		10,248	4–5
10	March 26, 2010	@ Calgary Roughnecks	Pengrowth Saddledome	W 17–13		10,486	5–5
11	March 27, 2010	@ Edmonton Rush	Rexall Place	L 14–16		6,200	5–6
12	April 3, 2010	Edmonton Rush	Xcel Energy Center	L 12–13	OT	8,935	5–7
13	April 9, 2010	Rochester Knighthawks	Xcel Energy Center	L 11–12		9,193	5–8
14	April 10, 2010	@ Boston Blazers	TD Banknorth Garden	L 8–13		10,032	5–9
15	April 17, 2010	Philadelphia Wings	Xcel Energy Center	L 12–13	OT	9,229	5–10
16	April 24, 2010	Orlando Titans	Xcel Energy Center	L 11–12	OT	10,768	5–11

== Playoffs ==
=== Game log ===
Game	Date	Opponent	Location	Score	OT	Attendance	Record
Division Semifinal	May 1, 2010	@ Washington Stealth	Comcast Arena at Everett	L 10–14		3,268	0–1

== Transactions ==
=== New players ===
- Brock Boyle - acquired in trade
- Ryan Benesch - acquired in trade
- Ryan Hoff - acquired in trade
- Richard Morgan - acquired in trade
- Scott Self - acquired in trade
- Sean Thompson - acquired in trade
- Jay Thorimbert - acquired in trade
- Alex Turner - acquired in trade

=== Players not returning ===
- Ian Rubel - traded
- Ryan Ward - traded

=== Trades ===
October 14, 2009	To Minnesota Swarm Ryan Hoff; Second round pick, 2011 entry draft	To Rochester Knighthawks Aaron Bold; Ian Rubel; Cody Johnson
September 24, 2009	To Minnesota Swarm Sean Thomson	To Philadelphia Wings Kevin Colleluori; Third round pick, 2010 entry draft
September 3, 2009	To Minnesota Swarm Richard Morgan	To Edmonton Rush First round pick, 2009 entry draft
September 3, 2009	To Minnesota Swarm Alex Turner; Aaron Bold	To Washington Stealth Two first round picks, 2009 entry draft
August 13, 2009	To Minnesota Swarm Jay Thorimbert	To Boston Blazers Second round pick, 2011 entry draft
July 7, 2009	To Minnesota Swarm Ryan Benesch; Scott Self; First round pick, 2009 entry draft	To Edmonton Rush Ryan Ward; Justin Norbraten; Scott Stewart; Richard Morgan

=== Entry draft ===
The 2009 NLL Entry Draft took place on September 9, 2009. The Swarm selected the following players:

Round	Overall	Player	College/Club
1	3	Zach Greer	Bryant University
4	36	Kevin Colleluori	Colgate University
5	44	Cody Johnson	Onondaga Community College
6	54	Matt Kelly	University of Virginia

== Roster ==
2010 Minnesota Swarm roster
Active (21-man) roster		Inactive roster	Coaches
Goaltenders: 31 (Canada) Kevin Croswell; 93 (Canada) Nick Patterson; Defensemen: -- (Canada) Brock Boyle; 4 (United States) Joe Cinosky; 50 (Canada) Ryan Cousins (C); 21 (Canada) Kevin Fines; 5 (United States) Josh Funk; 28 (Canada) Darren Halls; 34 (Canada) Nick Inch; 12 (Canada) Eric Pacey; 23 (Canada) Jon Sullivan	Forwards: 27 (United States) Colin Achenbach; -- (Canada) Ryan Benesch; 33 (United States) Kevin Buchanan; 19 (Canada) Chad Culp; 47 (Haudenosaunee) Travis Hill; 7 (United States) Dan Marohl; 8 (Canada) Rory McDade; 17 (Canada) Sean Pollock; 71 (Canada) Kevin Ross; 16 (Canada) Noah Talbot; -- (Canada) Sean Thomson; 22 (Canada) Andrew Watt; 10 (Canada) Aaron Wilson; 88 (Canada) Zack Greer; Transition: 26 (Canada) Ryan Sharp	Practice squad: -- (United States) Bruce Bickford; 15 (Canada) Brad Favero; 55 (Canada) Angus Goodleaf; 14 (Canada) Marc Jackson; 11 (United States) Tom Michaelson; 15 (United States) Daniel Nides; 13 (United States) Ricky Pages; -- (United States) Ross Zimmerman	Head coach {{{Head Coach}}} Legend: * Suspended list; (C) Captain; (A) Alternate captain; Roster updated {{{Date}}} NLL Transactions

== See also ==
- 2010 NLL season
