= 2012 Philadelphia Wings season =

2012 Philadelphia Wings
- League: NLL
- Division: 3rd East
- 2012 record: 7–9
- Home record: 3–5
- Road record: 4–4
- Goals for: 176
- Goals against: 207
- General Manager: Johnny Mouradian
- Coach: Johnny Mouradian
- Captain: Brodie Merrill
- Alternate captains: Dan Dawson; Max Seibald
- Arena: Wells Fargo Center
- Average attendance: 8212

Team leaders
- Goals: Kevin Crowley (36); Drew Westervelt (36)
- Assists: Dan Dawson (78)
- Points: Dan Dawson (103)
- Penalties in minutes: Paul Dawson (67)
- Loose Balls: Jeff Reynolds (166)
- Wins: Brandon Miller (7)
- Goals against average: Brandon Miller (12.64)

The Philadelphia Wings are a lacrosse team based in Philadelphia playing in the National Lacrosse League (NLL). The 2012 season was the 26th in franchise history.

In August, the Wings pulled off a blockbuster trade with the Edmonton Rush, sending star forward Athan Iannucci to the Rush along with Alex Turner, Brodie MacDonald, and three first round draft picks for two-time Transition Player of the Year Brodie Merrill, Dean Hill, Mike MacLellan, and two low draft picks. A month later, the look of the team changed even more dramatically, as the Wings landed superstar forward Dan Dawson in the Boston Blazers dispersal draft. The 2012 version of Boston's "big three" was completed when the Wings picked up star Stony Brook forward Kevin Crowley first overall in the entry draft.

The significant roster changes didn't help the Wings in their first game of the year, a 22–12 pounding at the hands of the Rochester Knighthawks. But the Wings settled down and won four of their next five games, and seven of ten to take the lead in the East division. The wheels fell off at the end of March, however, as the Wings lost an overtime game to the Colorado Mammoth, and then lost their next four. The losing streak included three games at home, and the Wings didn't score more than ten goals in any of their last four games.

They finished in third place in the East with a 7–9 record and made the playoffs. They traveled to Rochester to face the Knighthawks, who had beaten them three times already this season. In only their third playoff game since winning the Championship in 2001, the Wings came up a goal short, losing to the Knighthawks 14–13.

== Regular season ==
=== Conference standings ===
East Division
P	Team	GP	W	L	PCT	GB	Home	Road	GF	GA	Diff	GF/GP	GA/GP
1	Toronto Rock – xy	16	9	7	.562	0.0	3–5	6–2	198	196	+2	12.38	12.25
2	Rochester Knighthawks – x	16	7	9	.438	2.0	5–3	2–6	191	197	−6	11.94	12.31
3	Philadelphia Wings – x	16	7	9	.438	2.0	3–5	4–4	176	207	−31	11.00	12.94
4	Buffalo Bandits – x	16	7	9	.438	2.0	4–4	3–5	198	204	−6	12.38	12.75

West Division
P	Team	GP	W	L	PCT	GB	Home	Road	GF	GA	Diff	GF/GP	GA/GP
1	Calgary Roughnecks – xyz	16	12	4	.750	0.0	5–3	7–1	216	170	+46	13.50	10.62
2	Colorado Mammoth – x	16	11	5	.688	1.0	5–3	6–2	217	201	+16	13.56	12.56
3	Minnesota Swarm – x	16	9	7	.562	3.0	6–2	3–5	202	190	+12	12.62	11.88
4	Edmonton Rush – x	16	6	10	.375	6.0	4–4	2–6	167	175	−8	10.44	10.94
5	Washington Stealth	16	4	12	.250	8.0	2–6	2–6	179	204	−25	11.19	12.75

x: Clinched playoff berth; c: Clinched playoff berth by crossing over to another division; y: Clinched division; z: Clinched best regular season record; GP: Games Played
W: Wins; L: Losses; GB: Games back; PCT: Win percentage; Home: Record at Home; Road: Record on the Road; GF: Goals scored; GA: Goals allowed
Differential: Difference between goals scored and allowed; GF/GP: Average number of goals scored per game; GA/GP: Average number of goals allowed per game

== Game log ==
Game	Date	Opponent	Location	Score	OT	Attendance	Record
1	January 14, 2012	Rochester Knighthawks	Wells Fargo Center	L 12–22		8,813	0–1
2	January 21, 2012	Washington Stealth	Wells Fargo Center	W 10–9	OT	8,024	1–1
3	January 27, 2012	@ Buffalo Bandits	First Niagara Center	W 13–10		14,492	2–1
4	February 4, 2012	Toronto Rock	Wells Fargo Center	L 6–15		7,807	2–2
5	February 12, 2012	Buffalo Bandits	Wells Fargo Center	W 14–13		8,119	3–2
6	February 18, 2012	@ Toronto Rock	Air Canada Centre	W 14–8		10,360	4–2
7	February 24, 2012	@ Edmonton Rush	Rexall Place	L 10–12		6,708	4–3
8	March 3, 2012	Rochester Knighthawks	Wells Fargo Center	L 8–11		8,906	4–4
9	March 9, 2012	@ Toronto Rock	Air Canada Centre	W 12–10		9,804	5–4
10	March 17, 2012	Edmonton Rush	Wells Fargo Center	W 15–14		7,524	6–4
11	March 23, 2012	@ Colorado Mammoth	Pepsi Center	W 13–12		14,876	7–4
12	March 25, 2012	Colorado Mammoth	Wells Fargo Center	L 15–16	OT	8,435	7–5
13	April 6, 2012	Minnesota Swarm	Wells Fargo Center	L 9–13		8,070	7–6
14	April 7, 2012	@ Buffalo Bandits	First Niagara Center	L 7–17		15,060	7–7
15	April 21, 2012	@ Minnesota Swarm	Xcel Energy Center	L 10–15		9,357	7–8
16	April 28, 2012	@ Rochester Knighthawks	Blue Cross Arena	L 7–9		8,912	7–9

=== Playoffs ===
Game	Date	Opponent	Location	Score	OT	Attendance	Record
Division Semifinal	May 4, 2012	@ Rochester Knighthawks	Blue Cross Arena	L 13–14		5,176	0–1

== Transactions ==
=== Trades ===
August 9, 2011	To Philadelphia Wings Brodie Merrill; Mike McLellan; Dean Hill; 41st overall pick, 2011 entry draft 4th round pick, 2013 entry draft	To Edmonton Rush Athan Iannucci; Alex Turner; Brodie McDonald; 1st round pick, 2012 entry draft 1st round pick, 2013 entry draft 1st round pick, 2014 entry draft

=== Dispersal Draft ===
The Wings chose the following players in the Boston Blazers dispersal draft:

Round	Overall	Player
1	1	Dan Dawson
2	10	John Orson
3	19	Nick Cotter
4	28	Brett Queener

=== Entry draft ===
The 2011 NLL Entry Draft took place on September 21, 2011. The Wings selected the following players:

Round	Overall	Player	College/Club
1	1	Kevin Crowley	Stony Brook University
4	28	Steve Fryer	Coquitlam, AB
5	37	Matt Stefurak	University of Delaware

== Roster ==
2012 Philadelphia Wings roster
Active (21-man) roster		Inactive roster	Coaches
Goaltenders: 39 (Canada) Steve Fryer; 36 (Canada) Brandon Miller; 38 (Canada) Kurtis Wagar; Defensemen: 92 (Canada) Paul Dawson; 28 (Canada) Thomas Hajek; 15 (United States) Pat Heim; 37 (United States) Eric Hoffman; 8 (United States) Steve Holmes; 13 (United States) Brett Manney; 41 (United States) Ryan McFadyen; 21 (United States) Jeff Reynolds; 20 (Canada) Jordan Sealock; 16 (Canada) Joe Smith	Forwards: 22 (United States) Ned Crotty; 10 (Canada) Kevin Crowley; 6 (Canada) Dan Dawson (A); 90 (Canada) Mike Hominuck; 2 (United States) Brendan Mundorf; 26 (United States) Drew Westervelt; Transition: 71 (United States) David Brock; 23 (Canada) Dan Decklebaum; 17 (Canada) Brodie Merrill (C); 18 (United States) Max Seibald (A)	Injured reserve: – (Canada) Steve Grossi Jr.; 33 (United States) Bill McGlone; Holdout: 9 (United States) Dan Hardy; – (Canada) Matt Zash; Unable to play: – (Canada) Merrick Thompson; Restricted list: 5 (Canada) Mike Ward	Head coach {{{Head Coach}}} Legend: * Suspended list; (C) Captain; (A) Alternate captain; Roster updated 2011-11-11; NLL Transactions

== See also ==
- 2012 NLL season
