= 2011 Philadelphia Wings season =

2011 Philadelphia Wings
- League: NLL
- Division: 5th East
- 2011 record: 5–11
- Home record: 2–6
- Road record: 3–5
- Goals for: 143
- Goals against: 179
- General Manager: Johnny Mouradian
- Coach: John Tucker
- Captain: Taylor Wray
- Alternate captains: Ryan Boyle; Shawn Nadelen
- Arena: Wachovia Center

Team leaders
- Goals: Athan Iannucci (29)
- Assists: Brendan Mundorf (34)
- Points: Athan Iannucci (61)
- Penalties in minutes: Paul Dawson (35)
- Loose Balls: Jeff Reynolds (97)
- Wins: Brandon Miller (5)
- Goals against average: Brandon Miller (11.25)

The Philadelphia Wings are a lacrosse team based in Philadelphia playing in the National Lacrosse League (NLL). The 2011 season was the 25th in franchise history. 2011 was another frustrating season for the Wings as they finished 5–11 and out of the playoffs for the eighth time in the last nine seasons.

== Regular season ==
=== Conference standings ===
East Division
P	Team	GP	W	L	PCT	GB	Home	Road	GF	GA	Diff	GF/GP	GA/GP
1	Buffalo Bandits – xy	16	10	6	.625	0.0	4–4	6–2	169	159	+10	10.56	9.94
2	Toronto Rock – x	16	10	6	.625	0.0	7–1	3–5	187	168	+19	11.69	10.50
3	Rochester Knighthawks – x	16	10	6	.625	0.0	4–4	6–2	176	159	+17	11.00	9.94
4	Boston Blazers – x	16	8	8	.500	2.0	4–4	4–4	166	155	+11	10.38	9.69
5	Philadelphia Wings	16	5	11	.312	5.0	2–6	3–5	143	179	−36	8.94	11.19

West Division
P	Team	GP	W	L	PCT	GB	Home	Road	GF	GA	Diff	GF/GP	GA/GP
1	Calgary Roughnecks – xyz	16	11	5	.688	0.0	6–2	5–3	198	181	+17	12.38	11.31
2	Minnesota Swarm – x	16	8	8	.500	3.0	5–3	3–5	187	180	+7	11.69	11.25
3	Washington Stealth – x	16	8	8	.500	3.0	3–5	5–3	203	198	+5	12.69	12.38
4	Colorado Mammoth – x	16	5	11	.312	6.0	3–5	2–6	151	172	−21	9.44	10.75
5	Edmonton Rush	16	5	11	.312	6.0	4–4	1–7	175	204	−29	10.94	12.75

x: Clinched playoff berth; c: Clinched playoff berth by crossing over to another division; y: Clinched division; z: Clinched best regular season record; GP: Games Played
W: Wins; L: Losses; GB: Games back; PCT: Win percentage; Home: Record at Home; Road: Record on the Road; GF: Goals scored; GA: Goals allowed
Differential: Difference between goals scored and allowed; GF/GP: Average number of goals scored per game; GA/GP: Average number of goals allowed per game

== Game log ==
Game	Date	Opponent	Location	Score	OT	Attendance	Record
1	January 8, 2011	Boston Blazers	Wells Fargo Center	L 6–10		7,940	0–1
2	January 15, 2011	Buffalo Bandits	Wells Fargo Center	L 6–9		7,764	0–2
3	January 22, 2011	@ Colorado Mammoth	Pepsi Center	W 11–10		16,034	1–2
4	January 28, 2011	@ Boston Blazers	TD Garden	W 11–5		7,492	2–2
5	January 29, 2011	Colorado Mammoth	Wells Fargo Center	W 12–11		8,616	3–2
6	February 5, 2011	@ Rochester Knighthawks	Blue Cross Arena	L 6–11		4,560	3–3
7	February 12, 2011	Buffalo Bandits	Wells Fargo Center	L 7–16		9,649	3–4
8	February 19, 2011	@ Buffalo Bandits	HSBC Arena	W 10–9		15,344	4–4
9	February 26, 2011	Toronto Rock	Wells Fargo Center	L 13–16		7,082	4–5
10	March 4, 2011	@ Toronto Rock	Air Canada Centre	L 10–15		10,120	4–6
11	March 5, 2011	Calgary Roughnecks	Wells Fargo Center	L 7–13		9,604	4–7
12	March 26, 2011	@ Rochester Knighthawks	Blue Cross Arena	L 10–13		6,875	4–8
13	April 2, 2011	Toronto Rock	Wells Fargo Center	W 12–11		9,044	5–8
14	April 9, 2011	@ Boston Blazers	TD Garden	L 7–9		9,654	5–9
15	April 10, 2011	Rochester Knighthawks	Wells Fargo Center	L 6–10		9,595	5–10
16	April 16, 2011	@ Minnesota Swarm	Xcel Energy Center	L 9–11		9,635	5–11

== Roster ==
2011 Philadelphia Wings roster
Active (21-man) roster		Inactive roster	Coaches
Goaltenders: 36 (Canada) Brandon Miller; 45 (Canada) Ray Hodgkinson; 50 (Canada) Brodie MacDonald; Defensemen: 3 (United States) Matt Alrich; 6 (United States) Jeff Bigas; 8 (United States) Steve Holmes; 9 (United States) Dan Hardy; 13 (United States) Brett Manney; 16 (United States) Joe Smith; 21 (United States) Jeff Reynolds; 34 (United States) Shawn Nadelen (A); 44 (Canada) Taylor Wray (C); 92 (Canada) Paul Dawson	Forwards: 2 (United States) Brendan Mundorf; 14 (United States) Ryan Boyle (A); 23 (Canada) Athan Iannucci; 26 (United States) Drew Westervelt; 33 (United States) Bill McGlone; 87 (Canada) Alex Turner; Transition: 7 (United States) Kyle Sweeney; 17 (United States) David Brock; 18 (United States) Max Siebald; 27 (Canada) Ryan McClelland	Practice squad: -- (United States) Matt Danowski; Injured reserve: 9 (Canada) Merrick Thomson; 41 (United States) Ryan McFadyen	Head coach {{{Head Coach}}} Legend: * Suspended list; (C) Captain; (A) Alternate captain; Roster updated 2010-01-21; NLL Transactions

== See also ==
- 2011 NLL season
