= 2011 Washington Stealth season =

National Lacrosse League team season

2011 Washington Stealth
- West Division Champions
- League: NLL
- Division: 3rd West
- 2011 record: 8-8
- Home record: 3-5
- Road record: 5-3
- Goals for: 203
- Goals against: 198
- General Manager: Doug Locker
- Coach: Chris Hall
- Captain: Jason Bloom
- Alternate captains: Kyle Sorensen; Cam Sedgwick; Mike Grimes
- Arena: Comcast Arena at Everett

Team leaders
- Goals: Rhys Duch (42)
- Assists: Lewis Ratcliff (51)
- Points: Lewis Ratcliff (92)
- Penalties in minutes: Eric Martin (43)
- Loose Balls: Paul Rabil (153)
- Wins: Tyler Richards (5)
- Goals against average: Tyler Richards (11.61)

The Washington Stealth are a lacrosse team based in Everett, Washington. The team plays in the National Lacrosse League (NLL). The 2011 season was the second season in Washington, and the 12th in franchise history (previously the San Jose Stealth and Albany Attack). The Stealth finished third in the West division, but defeated the Minnesota Swarm and Calgary Roughnecks in the playoffs to advance to their second NLL Championship in as many years. They played the Toronto Rock once again, but this time the Rock prevailed 8-7.

== Regular season ==
=== Conference standings ===
East Division
P	Team	GP	W	L	PCT	GB	Home	Road	GF	GA	Diff	GF/GP	GA/GP
1	Buffalo Bandits – xy	16	10	6	.625	0.0	4–4	6–2	169	159	+10	10.56	9.94
2	Toronto Rock – x	16	10	6	.625	0.0	7–1	3–5	187	168	+19	11.69	10.50
3	Rochester Knighthawks – x	16	10	6	.625	0.0	4–4	6–2	176	159	+17	11.00	9.94
4	Boston Blazers – x	16	8	8	.500	2.0	4–4	4–4	166	155	+11	10.38	9.69
5	Philadelphia Wings	16	5	11	.312	5.0	2–6	3–5	143	179	−36	8.94	11.19

West Division
P	Team	GP	W	L	PCT	GB	Home	Road	GF	GA	Diff	GF/GP	GA/GP
1	Calgary Roughnecks – xyz	16	11	5	.688	0.0	6–2	5–3	198	181	+17	12.38	11.31
2	Minnesota Swarm – x	16	8	8	.500	3.0	5–3	3–5	187	180	+7	11.69	11.25
3	Washington Stealth – x	16	8	8	.500	3.0	3–5	5–3	203	198	+5	12.69	12.38
4	Colorado Mammoth – x	16	5	11	.312	6.0	3–5	2–6	151	172	−21	9.44	10.75
5	Edmonton Rush	16	5	11	.312	6.0	4–4	1–7	175	204	−29	10.94	12.75

x: Clinched playoff berth; c: Clinched playoff berth by crossing over to another division; y: Clinched division; z: Clinched best regular season record; GP: Games Played
W: Wins; L: Losses; GB: Games back; PCT: Win percentage; Home: Record at Home; Road: Record on the Road; GF: Goals scored; GA: Goals allowed
Differential: Difference between goals scored and allowed; GF/GP: Average number of goals scored per game; GA/GP: Average number of goals allowed per game

== Regular season ==
=== Game log ===
Game	Date	Opponent	Location	Score	OT	Attendance	Record
1	January 8, 2011	@ Colorado Mammoth	Pepsi Center	W 11–10	OT	17,029	1–0
2	January 9, 2011	Calgary Roughnecks	Comcast Arena at Everett	L 11–13		5,364	1–1
3	January 14, 2011	Minnesota Swarm	Comcast Arena at Everett	L 8–16		3,362	1–2
4	January 22, 2011	@ Calgary Roughnecks	Scotiabank Saddledome	W 19–14		9,362	2–2
5	January 29, 2011	@ Minnesota Swarm	Xcel Energy Center	L 10–11	OT	8,911	2–3
6	February 5, 2011	@ Colorado Mammoth	Pepsi Center	W 10–8		14,091	3–3
7	February 11, 2011	@ Edmonton Rush	Rexall Place	L 12–14		6,100	3–4
8	February 12, 2011	Edmonton Rush	Comcast Arena at Everett	L 14–15		4,088	3–5
9	February 18, 2011	Colorado Mammoth	Comcast Arena at Everett	W 20–7		3,160	4–5
10	March 5, 2011	@ Edmonton Rush	Rexall Place	W 18–10		7,370	5–5
11	March 13, 2011	Calgary Roughnecks	Comcast Arena at Everett	L 13–17		3,441	5–6
12	March 25, 2011	Boston Blazers	Comcast Arena at Everett	W 9–8		3,616	6–6
13	April 1, 2011	@ Toronto Rock	Air Canada Centre	L 12–13	OT	11,424	6–7
14	April 2, 2011	@ Buffalo Bandits	HSBC Arena	W 10–9	OT	18,690	7–7
15	April 9, 2011	Minnesota Swarm	Comcast Arena at Everett	W 16–15	OT	4,854	8–7
16	April 16, 2011	Rochester Knighthawks	Comcast Arena at Everett	L 10–18		5,161	8–8

== Playoffs ==
=== Game log ===
Game	Date	Opponent	Location	Score	OT	Attendance	Record
Division Semifinal	April 30, 2011	@ Minnesota Swarm	Xcel Energy Center	W 14–8		5,878	1–0
Division Final	May 7, 2011	@ Calgary Roughnecks	Scotiabank Saddledome	W 10–8		10,125	2–0
Championship Final	May 14, 2011	@ Toronto Rock	Air Canada Centre	L 7–8		14,488	2–1

== Roster ==
2011 Washington Stealth roster
Active (21-man) roster		Inactive roster	Coaches
Goaltenders: 00 (Canada) Tyler Richards; Defensemen: 2 (Canada) Matt Beers; 23 (Canada) Mike Grimes; 6 (Canada) Curtis Hodgson; 25 (United States) Eric Martin; 24 (United States) Chris O'Dougherty; 3 (Canada) Jeff Moleski; 44 (Canada) Chris McElroy; -- (Canada) Kyle Ross	Forwards: 10 (Canada) Rhys Duch; 8 (Canada) Tom Johnson; 19 (Canada) Kory Kowalyk; 42 (Canada) Lewis Ratcliff; 29 (Canada) Cam Sedgwick; 15 (Canada) Luke Wiles; 4 (Canada) Peter Morgan; 20 (Canada) Craig Conn; -- (Canada) Jamie Rooney; -- (Canada) Josh Wasson; -- (Canada) Dan Teat; Transition: 47 (Canada) Jason Bloom (C); 21 (Canada) Chet Koneczny; 18 (United States) Kyle Hartzell; 12 (United States) Ben Hunt; 39 (United States) Jamison Koesterer; 9 (United States) Paul Rabil	Practice Squad: 55 (Canada) Martin Cummings; 41 (Canada) Bob Snider; 32 (Canada) Chris Seidel; Injured Reserve: 16 (Canada) Joel Dalgarno; 67 (Canada) Jeff Zywicki (A); Unable to play: 11 (Canada) Kyle Sorensen	Head Coach {{{Head Coach}}} Legend: * Suspended list; (C) Captain; (A) Alternate captain; updated 2011-01-19; NLL Transactions

== See also ==
- 2011 NLL season
