= 2012 Colorado Mammoth season =

Lacrosse team in Denver CO, United States

2012 Colorado Mammoth
- League: NLL
- Division: 2nd West
- 2012 record: 11–5
- Home record: 5–3
- Road record: 6–2
- Goals for: 217
- Goals against: 201
- General Manager: Steve Govett
- Coach: Bob Hamley
- Captain: Gavin Prout
- Alternate captains: John Grant, Jr. Jon Sullivan
- Arena: Pepsi Center

Team leaders
- Goals: John Grant, Jr. (50)
- Assists: John Grant, Jr. (66)
- Points: John Grant, Jr. (116)
- Penalties in minutes: Rory Smith (35)
- Loose Balls: Illja Gajic (124)
- Wins: Chris Levis (10)
- Goals against average: Chris Levis (12.26)

The Colorado Mammoth is a lacrosse team based in Denver, Colorado playing in the National Lacrosse League (NLL). The 2012 season was the 26th in franchise history and 10th as the Mammoth (previously the Washington Power, Pittsburgh Crossefire, and Baltimore Thunder).

== Regular season ==
=== Conference standings ===
East Division
P	Team	GP	W	L	PCT	GB	Home	Road	GF	GA	Diff	GF/GP	GA/GP
1	Toronto Rock – xy	16	9	7	.562	0.0	3–5	6–2	198	196	+2	12.38	12.25
2	Rochester Knighthawks – x	16	7	9	.438	2.0	5–3	2–6	191	197	−6	11.94	12.31
3	Philadelphia Wings – x	16	7	9	.438	2.0	3–5	4–4	176	207	−31	11.00	12.94
4	Buffalo Bandits – x	16	7	9	.438	2.0	4–4	3–5	198	204	−6	12.38	12.75

West Division
P	Team	GP	W	L	PCT	GB	Home	Road	GF	GA	Diff	GF/GP	GA/GP
1	Calgary Roughnecks – xyz	16	12	4	.750	0.0	5–3	7–1	216	170	+46	13.50	10.62
2	Colorado Mammoth – x	16	11	5	.688	1.0	5–3	6–2	217	201	+16	13.56	12.56
3	Minnesota Swarm – x	16	9	7	.562	3.0	6–2	3–5	202	190	+12	12.62	11.88
4	Edmonton Rush – x	16	6	10	.375	6.0	4–4	2–6	167	175	−8	10.44	10.94
5	Washington Stealth	16	4	12	.250	8.0	2–6	2–6	179	204	−25	11.19	12.75

x: Clinched playoff berth; c: Clinched playoff berth by crossing over to another division; y: Clinched division; z: Clinched best regular season record; GP: Games Played
W: Wins; L: Losses; GB: Games back; PCT: Win percentage; Home: Record at Home; Road: Record on the Road; GF: Goals scored; GA: Goals allowed
Differential: Difference between goals scored and allowed; GF/GP: Average number of goals scored per game; GA/GP: Average number of goals allowed per game

== Game log ==
Game	Date	Opponent	Location	Score	OT	Attendance	Record
1	January 14, 2012	Minnesota Swarm	Pepsi Center	W 20–14		14,106	1–0
2	January 20, 2012	@ Edmonton Rush	Rexall Place	W 13–12		8,192	2–0
3	January 21, 2012	@ Calgary Roughnecks	Scotiabank Saddledome	W 13–12	OT	9,341	3–0
4	January 28, 2012	Rochester Knighthawks	Pepsi Center	W 14–11		15,210	4–0
5	February 4, 2012	Edmonton Rush	Pepsi Center	W 11–7		14,055	5–0
6	February 18, 2012	@ Minnesota Swarm	Xcel Energy Center	W 12–7		9,030	6–0
7	February 24, 2012	Calgary Roughnecks	Pepsi Center	L 10–21		15,134	6–1
8	March 3, 2012	@ Buffalo Bandits	First Niagara Center	W 16–13		15,845	7–1
9	March 10, 2012	Washington Stealth	Pepsi Center	W 13–11		17,116	8–1
10	March 11, 2012	@ Washington Stealth	Comcast Arena at Everett	L 8–11		3,919	8–2
11	March 23, 2012	Philadelphia Wings	Pepsi Center	L 12–13		14,876	8–3
12	March 25, 2012	@ Philadelphia Wings	Wells Fargo Center	W 16–15	OT	8,435	9–3
13	March 31, 2012	@ Rochester Knighthawks	Blue Cross Arena	W 16–12		5,611	10–3
14	April 14, 2012	Toronto Rock	Pepsi Center	W 19–12		15,215	11–3
15	April 20, 2012	Edmonton Rush	Pepsi Center	L 11–14		16,201	11–4
16	April 28, 2012	@ Minnesota Swarm	Xcel Energy Center	L 13–16		11,297	11–5

== Playoffs ==
=== Game log ===
Game	Date	Opponent	Location	Score	OT	Attendance	Record
Division Semifinal	May 5, 2012	Minnesota Swarm	Pepsi Center	L 10–14		14,152	0–1

== Transactions ==
=== Trades ===
July 13, 2011	To Colorado Mammoth Mat MacLeod; Creighton Reid; 1st round pick in 2011 Entry Draft; 2nd round pick in 2011 entry draft	To Toronto Rock Dan Carey; 3rd round pick in 2011 entry draft 1st round pick in 2013 entry draft
September 6, 2011	To Colorado Mammoth Jon Sullivan; Rory Smith; Sean Pollock	To Minnesota Swarm 1st round pick in Boston Blazers dispersal draft (Anthony Cosmo)
March 20, 2012	To Colorado Mammoth Jamie Shewchuk	To Minnesota Swarm 3rd round pick in 2013 Entry Draft

=== Dispersal Draft ===
The Mammoth chose the following players in the Boston Blazers dispersal draft:

Round	Overall	Player
2	12	Ryan Hotaling
3	21	Greg Peyser
4	29	Gary Bining
5	35	Sean Morris

=== Entry draft ===
The 2011 NLL Entry Draft took place on September 21, 2011. The Mammoth selected the following players:

Round	Overall	Player	College/Club
1	3	Adam Jones	Canisius College
1	8	Dan Coates	Canisius College
2	13	Jordan McBride	Stoney Brook University
2	14	Jamie Lincoln	Hofstra University
2	16	Tye Belanger	Peterborough, ON
4	30	Craig England	Orangeville, ON
5	38	Joey Cupido	Six Nations, ON
6	47	Jovan Miller	Syracuse University

== Roster ==
2012 Colorado Mammoth roster
Active (21-man) roster		Inactive roster	Coaches
Goaltenders: 30 (Canada) Chris Levis; 35 (Canada) Dan Lewis; Defensemen: 37 (Canada) Dan Coates; 11 (Canada) John Gallant; 66 (Canada) Matt Leveque; 56 (United States) John Orsen; 12 (United States) Jarett Park; 62 (Canada) Creighton Reid; 42 (Canada) Rory Smith; 23 (Canada) Jon Sullivan (A); 88 (Canada) Ian Hawksbee	Forwards: 10 (Canada) Alex Gajic; 24 (Canada) John Grant, Jr. (A); 20 (Canada) Derek Hopcroft; 16 (Canada) Adam Jones; 44 (Canada) Jamie Lincoln; 14 (Canada) Jordan McBride; 17 (Canada) Sean Pollock; 9 (Canada) Gavin Prout (C); Transition: 15 (Canada) Illja Gajic; 19 (Canada) Cameron Holding; 13 (Canada) Mat MacLeod; 1 (Canada) Jed Prossner; 8 (Canada) Scott Stewart	Practice squad: 31 (Canada) Tye Belanger; 82 (Canada) Joey Cupido; 46 (United States) Jovan Miller; Injured reserve: 7 (Canada) Mac Allen; -- (Canada) Jamie Shewchuk; Holdout: 96 (Canada) Joel Dalgarno; Restricted list: -- (United States) Ken Clausen; -- (United States) Tom Ethington; -- (United States) Ryan Hotaling	Head coach {{{Head Coach}}} Legend: * Suspended list; (C) Captain; (A) Alternate captain; updated 2011-12-21; NLL Transactions

== See also ==
- 2012 NLL season
