= 2012 Rochester Knighthawks season =

2012 Rochester Knighthawks
- Champion's Cup Champions
- East Division Champions
- League: NLL
- Division: 2nd East
- 2012 record: 7-9
- Home record: 5-3
- Road record: 2-6
- Goals for: 191
- Goals against: 197
- General Manager: Curt Styres
- Coach: Mike Hasen
- Captain: Pat McCready
- Arena: Blue Cross Arena

Team leaders
- Goals: Cody Jamieson (36)
- Assists: Cody Jamieson (49)
- Points: Cody Jamieson (85)
- Penalties in minutes: Kyle Laverty (46)
- Loose Balls: Pat McCready (94)
- Wins: Matt Vinc (7)
- Goals against average: Matt Vinc (12.21)

The Rochester Knighthawks were a lacrosse team based in Rochester, New York, that played in the National Lacrosse League (NLL). The 2012 season was the 18th in franchise history. After a 7-9 season, the Knighthawks came on strong in the playoffs and won their third NLL Championship, defeating the Edmonton Rush 9-6.

== Regular season ==
=== Conference standings ===
East Division
P	Team	GP	W	L	PCT	GB	Home	Road	GF	GA	Diff	GF/GP	GA/GP
1	Toronto Rock – xy	16	9	7	.562	0.0	3–5	6–2	198	196	+2	12.38	12.25
2	Rochester Knighthawks – x	16	7	9	.438	2.0	5–3	2–6	191	197	−6	11.94	12.31
3	Philadelphia Wings – x	16	7	9	.438	2.0	3–5	4–4	176	207	−31	11.00	12.94
4	Buffalo Bandits – x	16	7	9	.438	2.0	4–4	3–5	198	204	−6	12.38	12.75

West Division
P	Team	GP	W	L	PCT	GB	Home	Road	GF	GA	Diff	GF/GP	GA/GP
1	Calgary Roughnecks – xyz	16	12	4	.750	0.0	5–3	7–1	216	170	+46	13.50	10.62
2	Colorado Mammoth – x	16	11	5	.688	1.0	5–3	6–2	217	201	+16	13.56	12.56
3	Minnesota Swarm – x	16	9	7	.562	3.0	6–2	3–5	202	190	+12	12.62	11.88
4	Edmonton Rush – x	16	6	10	.375	6.0	4–4	2–6	167	175	−8	10.44	10.94
5	Washington Stealth	16	4	12	.250	8.0	2–6	2–6	179	204	−25	11.19	12.75

x: Clinched playoff berth; c: Clinched playoff berth by crossing over to another division; y: Clinched division; z: Clinched best regular season record; GP: Games Played
W: Wins; L: Losses; GB: Games back; PCT: Win percentage; Home: Record at Home; Road: Record on the Road; GF: Goals scored; GA: Goals allowed
Differential: Difference between goals scored and allowed; GF/GP: Average number of goals scored per game; GA/GP: Average number of goals allowed per game

== Game log ==
Game	Date	Opponent	Location	Score	OT	Attendance	Record
1	January 14, 2012	@ Philadelphia Wings	Wells Fargo Center	W 22–12		8,813	1–0
2	January 21, 2012	Buffalo Bandits	Blue Cross Arena	L 9–12		9,776	1–1
3	January 27, 2012	@ Toronto Rock	Air Canada Centre	L 11–13		11,862	1–2
4	January 28, 2012	@ Colorado Mammoth	Pepsi Center	L 11–14		15,210	1–3
5	February 4, 2012	Minnesota Swarm	Blue Cross Arena	W 16–14		5,267	2–3
6	February 12, 2012	@ Minnesota Swarm	Xcel Energy Center	L 6–9		8,087	2–4
7	February 18, 2012	Washington Stealth	Blue Cross Arena	W 15–12		6,163	3–4
8	February 24, 2012	@ Toronto Rock	Air Canada Centre	L 12–16		10,274	3–5
9	March 3, 2012	@ Philadelphia Wings	Wells Fargo Center	W 11–8		8,906	4–5
10	March 10, 2012	Buffalo Bandits	Blue Cross Arena	W 13–10		7,254	5–5
11	March 24, 2012	Toronto Rock	Blue Cross Arena	L 7–13		5,714	5–6
12	March 31, 2012	Colorado Mammoth	Blue Cross Arena	L 12–16		5,611	5–7
13	April 6, 2012	@ Calgary Roughnecks	Scotiabank Saddledome	L 14–15		9,806	5–8
14	April 14, 2012	Calgary Roughnecks	Blue Cross Arena	W 14–12		5,964	6–8
15	April 21, 2012	@ Buffalo Bandits	First Niagara Center	L 9–14		18,690	6–9
16	April 28, 2012	Philadelphia Wings	Blue Cross Arena	W 9–7		8,912	7–9

=== Playoffs ===
Game	Date	Opponent	Location	Score	OT	Attendance	Record
Division Semifinal	May 4, 2012	Philadelphia Wings	Blue Cross Arena	W 14–13		5,176	1–0
Division Final	May 12, 2012	@ Toronto Rock	Air Canada Centre	W 17–13		9,384	2–0
Championship Game	May 19, 2012	Edmonton Rush	Blue Cross Arena	W 9–6		9,277	3–0

== Transactions ==
=== Trades ===
September 21, 2011	To Rochester Knighthawks 1st round pick, 2011 entry draft (Johnny Powless)	To Calgary Roughnecks Shawn Evans
July 25, 2011	To Rochester Knighthawks Ryan Cousins; Andy Secore; Alex Kedoh Hill	To Edmonton Rush Shawn Williams; Aaron Bold; 2nd round pick, 2012 entry draft
March 20, 2012	To Rochester Knighthawks Jamison Koesterer	To Washington Stealth 3rd round pick in 2013 Entry Draft

=== Dispersal Draft ===
The Knighthawks chose the following players in the Boston Blazers dispersal draft:

Round	Overall	Player
1	5	Mike Kirk
2	14	Casey Powell
3	23	Jack Reid

=== Entry draft ===
The 2011 NLL Entry Draft took place on September 21, 2011. The Knighthawks selected the following players:

Round	Overall	Player	College/Club
1	2	Stephen Keogh	Syracuse University
1	5	Johnny Powless	Six Nations, ON
2	10	Joel White	Syracuse University
3	23	Kyle Andrews	Brampton, ON
4	32	Shane Cater	Six Nations, ON
5	36	Aaron Tackaberry	Calgary, AB
5	40	Cal Kitson	Brampton, ON
6	45	Kraig Maracle	Six Nations, ON
6	49	Grant Catalino	University of Maryland

== Roster ==
2012 Rochester Knighthawks roster
Active (21-man) roster		Inactive roster	Coaches
Goaltenders: 33 (Haudenosaunee) Jake Henhawk; 48 (Canada) Matt Vinc; Defensemen: 7 (Canada) Tyler Burton; 37 (Canada) Scott Campbell; 50 (Canada) Ryan Cousins; 16 (Canada) Dylan Evans; 26 (Canada) Mike Kirk; 17 (Canada) Kyle Laverty; 10 (Canada) Pat McCready (C); 79 (Haudenosaunee) Sid Smith	Forwards: 44 (Canada) Mike Accursi; 42 (Canada) Jarrett Davis; 88 (Haudenosaunee) Cody Jamieson; 28 (Canada) Stephen Keogh; 9 (Haudenosaunee) Craig Point; 94 (Haudenosaunee) Johnny Powless; 23 (Canada) Cory Vitarelli; 1 (United States) Joe Walters; Transition: 20 (Canada) Jordan Hall; 25 (Canada) Brad Self; 11 (United States) Joel White	Practice squad: 4 (Canada) Jamie Batson; 77 (Canada) Tim O'Brien; 6 (Canada) Joe Smith; Holdout: -- (Canada) Troy Bonterre; -- (Canada) Jamison Koesterer; 4 (Canada) Joel McCready; 22 (United States) Casey Powell; -- (United States) Jack Reid; Protected list: -- (United States) Michael Evans; Unable to play: 86 (Canada) Rory Glaves; 47 (United States) Travis Hill	Head coach {{{Head Coach}}} Legend: * Suspended list; (C) Captain; (A) Alternate captain; updated 2011-12-22; NLL Transactions

== See also ==
- 2012 NLL season
