= 2011 Buffalo Bandits season =

2011 Buffalo Bandits
- League: NLL
- Division: 2nd East
- 2011 record: 10–6
- Home record: 4–4
- Road record: 6–2
- Goals for: 169
- Goals against: 159
- General Manager: David Zygaj
- Coach: Darris Kilgour
- Captain: Chris White
- Alternate captains: John Tavares
- Arena: HSBC Arena

Team leaders
- Goals: Mark Steenhuis (36)
- Assists: Mark Steenhuis (54)
- Points: Mark Steenhuis (90)
- Penalties in minutes: Ian Llord (53)
- Loose Balls: Tom Montour (112)
- Wins: Mike Thompson (5)
- Goals against average: Mike Thompson (9.92)

The Buffalo Bandits are a lacrosse team based in Buffalo, New York playing in the National Lacrosse League (NLL). The 2011 season was their twentieth season in the NLL. The Bandits finished tied with the Toronto Rock and Rochester Knighthawks with the best record in the East at 10–6, but were awarded first place due to tiebreakers. After defeating the Boston Blazers in the Division Semifinal, the Bandits lost to the eventual league champion Toronto Rock in the Division Final. The Bandits were led by Mark Steenhuis, who scored 36 goals and had 54 assists on the year.

== Standings ==
East Division
P	Team	GP	W	L	PCT	GB	Home	Road	GF	GA	Diff	GF/GP	GA/GP
1	Buffalo Bandits – xy	16	10	6	.625	0.0	4–4	6–2	169	159	+10	10.56	9.94
2	Toronto Rock – x	16	10	6	.625	0.0	7–1	3–5	187	168	+19	11.69	10.50
3	Rochester Knighthawks – x	16	10	6	.625	0.0	4–4	6–2	176	159	+17	11.00	9.94
4	Boston Blazers – x	16	8	8	.500	2.0	4–4	4–4	166	155	+11	10.38	9.69
5	Philadelphia Wings	16	5	11	.312	5.0	2–6	3–5	143	179	−36	8.94	11.19

West Division
P	Team	GP	W	L	PCT	GB	Home	Road	GF	GA	Diff	GF/GP	GA/GP
1	Calgary Roughnecks – xyz	16	11	5	.688	0.0	6–2	5–3	198	181	+17	12.38	11.31
2	Minnesota Swarm – x	16	8	8	.500	3.0	5–3	3–5	187	180	+7	11.69	11.25
3	Washington Stealth – x	16	8	8	.500	3.0	3–5	5–3	203	198	+5	12.69	12.38
4	Colorado Mammoth – x	16	5	11	.312	6.0	3–5	2–6	151	172	−21	9.44	10.75
5	Edmonton Rush	16	5	11	.312	6.0	4–4	1–7	175	204	−29	10.94	12.75

x: Clinched playoff berth; c: Clinched playoff berth by crossing over to another division; y: Clinched division; z: Clinched best regular season record; GP: Games Played
W: Wins; L: Losses; GB: Games back; PCT: Win percentage; Home: Record at Home; Road: Record on the Road; GF: Goals scored; GA: Goals allowed
Differential: Difference between goals scored and allowed; GF/GP: Average number of goals scored per game; GA/GP: Average number of goals allowed per game

=== Game log ===
Game	Date	Opponent	Location	Score	OT	Attendance	Record
1	January 8, 2011	@ Calgary Roughnecks	Scotiabank Saddledome	L 9–10		9,590	0–1
2	January 15, 2011	@ Philadelphia Wings	Wells Fargo Center	W 9–6		7,764	1–1
3	January 22, 2011	Toronto Rock	HSBC Arena	W 15–14	OT	16,685	2–1
4	January 29, 2011	@ Toronto Rock	Air Canada Centre	L 5–8		10,812	2–2
5	February 4, 2011	Minnesota Swarm	HSBC Arena	W 15–12		15,001	3–2
6	February 12, 2011	@ Philadelphia Wings	Wells Fargo Center	W 16–7		9,649	4–2
7	February 19, 2011	Philadelphia Wings	HSBC Arena	L 9–10		15,344	4–3
8	March 5, 2011	Rochester Knighthawks	HSBC Arena	W 11–8		18,690	5–3
9	March 6, 2011	@ Boston Blazers	TD Garden	W 9–8		8,524	6–3
10	March 12, 2011	Boston Blazers	HSBC Arena	W 12–10		16,347	7–3
11	March 27, 2011	@ Minnesota Swarm	Xcel Energy Center	W 12–9		9,294	8–3
12	April 2, 2011	Washington Stealth	HSBC Arena	L 9–10	OT	18,690	8–4
13	April 8, 2011	@ Toronto Rock	Air Canada Centre	W 11–8		15,084	9–4
14	April 9, 2011	@ Rochester Knighthawks	Blue Cross Arena	W 9–8		9,216	10–4
15	April 16, 2011	Boston Blazers	HSBC Arena	L 9–16		17,318	10–5
16	April 23, 2011	Rochester Knighthawks	HSBC Arena	L 9–15		18,690	10–6

== Playoffs ==
=== Game log ===
Game	Date	Opponent	Location	Score	OT	Attendance	Record
Division Semifinal	April 30, 2011	Boston Blazers	HSBC Arena	W 11–10		11,273	1–0
Division Final	May 7, 2011	Toronto Rock	HSBC Arena	L 11–12		12,349	1–1

== Player stats ==
=== Runners (Top 10) ===
Player	GP	G	A	Pts	LB	PIM
John Tavares	16	32	46	78	59	10
Mark Steenhuis	16	22	39	61	82	18
Tracey Kelusky	16	21	33	54	54	11
Chad Culp	15	21	19	40	61	10
Roger Vyse	13	16	20	36	49	2
Brenden Thenhaus	16	17	18	35	42	8
Brett Bucktooth	15	12	19	31	45	12
Tom Montour	15	6	11	17	104	14
Kyle Clancy	9	5	7	12	14	4
Chris Corbeil	16	5	6	11	121	10
Totals		169	268	437	1,150	369

=== Goaltenders ===
Player	GP	MIN	W	L	GA	Sv%	GAA
Mike Thompson	16	763:13	10	3	123	.785	9.67
Angus Goodleaf	16	206:01	0	3	35	.767	10.19
Totals		969:14	10	6	158	.781	9.78

== Transactions ==
=== Trades ===
October 6, 2010	To Calgary Roughnecks First round pick, 2011 entry draft	To Buffalo Bandits Tracey Kelusky; Third round pick, 2011 entry draft

=== Entry draft ===
The 2010 NLL Entry Draft took place on September 8, 2010. The Bandits selected the following players:

Round	Overall	Player	College/Club
1	9	Travis Irving	New Westminster, British Columbia
2	13	Ben McCullough	SUNY Potsdam
2	21	Wayne Van Every	Six Nations, Ontario
4	37	Holden Vyse	Six Nations, Ontario
5	47	Jimmy Purves	Six Nations, Ontario
6	57	Elijah Printup	Six Nations, Ontario
6	60	Jordan Costa	Mississauga, Ontario

- Minnesota traded their 13th overall pick and their third round pick in 2011 to for both Buffalo's 15th and 27th overall picks.
- Toronto traded their 60th overall pick for Buffalo's sixth round pick in 2011.

== Roster ==
2011 Buffalo Bandits roster
Active (21-man) roster		Inactive roster	Coaches
Goaltenders: 55 (Haudenosaunee) Angus Goodleaf; 66 (Haudenosaunee) Michael Thompson; Defensemen: -- (Canada) Damon Edwards; 19 (Canada) Darryl Gibson; 65 (Haudenosaunee) Clay Hill; 88 (Canada) Travis Irving; 2 (Canada) Ian Llord; 23 (Canada) Steve Priolo; 6 (Canada) Scott Self; 6 (Canada) Chris White (C)	Forwards: 26 (Haudenosaunee) Brett Bucktooth; -- (United States) Kevin Buchanan; 22 (Canada) Kyle Clancy; 20 (Canada) Chad Culp; 84 (Haudenosaunee) Brandon Francis; 17 (Canada) Tracey Kelusky; 5 (United States) Frank Resetarits; 11 (Canada) John Tavares (A); 10 (Canada) Brendan Thenhaus; 81 (Haudenosaunee) Roger Vyse; -- (Canada) Luke Wiles; Transition: 7 (Canada) Jon Harasym; 63 (Haudenosaunee) Thomas Montour; 9 (Canada) Mark Steenhuis; 75 (Canada) Jay Thorimbert	Practice squad: 0 (United States) Ben McCullough; 98 (Canada) Jimmy Purves; Injured reserve: 29 (Haudenosaunee) Ken Montour; 3 (Canada) Billy Dee Smith; Unable to play: 51 (Canada) Kevin Dostie; -- (Canada) Sean Greenhalgh	Head coach {{{Head Coach}}} Legend: * Suspended list; (C) Captain; (A) Alternate captain; Roster updated 2011-2-27; NLL Transactions

== See also ==
- 2011 NLL season
