= 2011 Boston Blazers season =

Lacrosse season

2011 Boston Blazers
- League: NLL
- Division: 4th East
- 2011 record: 8-8
- Home record: 4-4
- Road record: 4-4
- Goals for: 166
- Goals against: 155
- General Manager: Doug Reffue
- Coach: Tom Ryan
- Captain: Dan Dawson
- Arena: TD Banknorth Garden
- Average attendance: 8,712

Team leaders
- Goals: Casey Powell (34)
- Assists: Dan Dawson (59)
- Points: Dan Dawson (90)
- Penalties in minutes: Jack Reid (48)
- Loose Balls: Kyle Rubisch (143)
- Wins: Anthony Cosmo (8)
- Goals against average: Anthony Cosmo (9.66)

The Boston Blazers are a lacrosse team based in Boston playing in the National Lacrosse League (NLL). The 2011 season was their third and final season in the NLL. After acquiring both Casey Powell and Josh Sanderson in the off-season, the Blazers looked to dominate the NLL East. But the Blazers did not gel as much as they might have hoped, and finished 4th in the East with an 8-8 record.

== Standings ==
East Division
P	Team	GP	W	L	PCT	GB	Home	Road	GF	GA	Diff	GF/GP	GA/GP
1	Buffalo Bandits – xy	16	10	6	.625	0.0	4–4	6–2	169	159	+10	10.56	9.94
2	Toronto Rock – x	16	10	6	.625	0.0	7–1	3–5	187	168	+19	11.69	10.50
3	Rochester Knighthawks – x	16	10	6	.625	0.0	4–4	6–2	176	159	+17	11.00	9.94
4	Boston Blazers – x	16	8	8	.500	2.0	4–4	4–4	166	155	+11	10.38	9.69
5	Philadelphia Wings	16	5	11	.312	5.0	2–6	3–5	143	179	−36	8.94	11.19

West Division
P	Team	GP	W	L	PCT	GB	Home	Road	GF	GA	Diff	GF/GP	GA/GP
1	Calgary Roughnecks – xyz	16	11	5	.688	0.0	6–2	5–3	198	181	+17	12.38	11.31
2	Minnesota Swarm – x	16	8	8	.500	3.0	5–3	3–5	187	180	+7	11.69	11.25
3	Washington Stealth – x	16	8	8	.500	3.0	3–5	5–3	203	198	+5	12.69	12.38
4	Colorado Mammoth – x	16	5	11	.312	6.0	3–5	2–6	151	172	−21	9.44	10.75
5	Edmonton Rush	16	5	11	.312	6.0	4–4	1–7	175	204	−29	10.94	12.75

x: Clinched playoff berth; c: Clinched playoff berth by crossing over to another division; y: Clinched division; z: Clinched best regular season record; GP: Games Played
W: Wins; L: Losses; GB: Games back; PCT: Win percentage; Home: Record at Home; Road: Record on the Road; GF: Goals scored; GA: Goals allowed
Differential: Difference between goals scored and allowed; GF/GP: Average number of goals scored per game; GA/GP: Average number of goals allowed per game

=== Game log ===
Game	Date	Opponent	Location	Score	OT	Attendance	Record
1	January 8, 2011	@ Philadelphia Wings	Wells Fargo Center	W 10–6		7,940	1–0
2	January 15, 2011	Edmonton Rush	TD Garden	W 10–7		8,536	2–0
3	January 21, 2011	@ Toronto Rock	Air Canada Centre	L 14–15	OT	9,104	2–1
4	January 22, 2011	Rochester Knighthawks	TD Garden	L 10–11	OT	10,422	2–2
5	January 28, 2011	Philadelphia Wings	TD Garden	L 5–11		7,492	2–3
6	January 29, 2011	@ Rochester Knighthawks	Blue Cross Arena	W 16–7		4,945	3–3
7	February 5, 2011	Toronto Rock	TD Garden	W 9–7		7,598	4–3
8	February 12, 2011	Colorado Mammoth	TD Garden	W 11–6		8,462	5–3
9	February 19, 2011	@ Minnesota Swarm	Xcel Energy Center	W 14–11		7,051	6–3
10	March 6, 2011	Buffalo Bandits	TD Garden	L 8–9		8,524	6–4
11	March 12, 2011	@ Buffalo Bandits	HSBC Arena	L 10–12		16,347	6–5
12	March 25, 2011	@ Washington Stealth	Comcast Arena at Everett	L 8–9		3,616	6–6
13	March 26, 2011	@ Colorado Mammoth	Pepsi Center	L 8–9	OT	17,123	6–7
14	April 2, 2011	Rochester Knighthawks	TD Garden	L 8–19		9,008	6–8
15	April 9, 2011	Philadelphia Wings	TD Garden	W 9–7		9,654	7–8
16	April 16, 2011	@ Buffalo Bandits	HSBC Arena	W 16–9		17,318	8–8

== Playoffs ==
=== Game log ===
Game	Date	Opponent	Location	Score	OT	Attendance	Record
Division Semifinal	April 30, 2011	Buffalo Bandits	TD Garden	L 10–11		11,273	0–1

== Transactions ==
=== Trades ===
August 23, 2010	To Boston Blazers Kevin Buchanan; Fourth round pick, 2010 entry draft	To Washington Stealth Mat Giles; First round pick, 2012 entry draft
August 13, 2010	To Boston Blazers Josh Sanderson; First round pick, 2010 entry draft	To Calgary Roughnecks Daryl Veltman; Jon Harnett; Kyle Ross; First round pick, 2010 entry draft
August 12, 2010	To Boston Blazers Fourth round pick, 2011 entry draft	To Calgary Roughnecks Paul Dawson

=== Entry draft ===
The 2010 NLL Entry Draft took place on September 8, 2010. The Blazers selected the following players:

Round	Overall	Player	College/Club
1	2	Kyle Rubisch	Dowling College
1	7	David Brock	University at Albany
3	26	Matt Quinton	Roanoke College
4	35	Martin Cahill	University of Delaware
4	36	Brock Armour	Towson University
5	46	Tyler Collins	Colgate University
6	54	Chase Williams	Bellarmine University

== Roster ==
2011 Boston Blazers roster
Active (21-man) roster		Inactive roster	Coaches
Goaltenders: 44 (Canada) Anthony Cosmo; 66 (Canada) Nick Rose; Defensemen: 85 (United States) Mitch Belisle; 12 (Canada) Jon "Bubba" Durno; 28 (Canada) Dilan Graham; 33 (Canada) Jon Harnett; 4 (Canada) Carter Livingstone; 15 (Canada) Curtis Ptolemy; 18 (United States) Jack Reid	Forwards: 22 (Canada) Bryan Bendig; 9 (Canada) Gary Bining; 6 (Canada) Dan Dawson (C); 8 (United States) Greg Downing; 19 (Canada) Matt Lyons; 17 (Canada) Geoff McNulty; 25 (United States) Sean Morris; 23 (United States) Brett Queener; Transition: 47 (Canada) Jason Bloom; 37 (Canada) Nick Cotter	Practice squad: 20 Travis Brown; 05 Paul Manesis	Head coach {{{Head Coach}}} Legend: * Suspended list; (C) Captain; (A) Alternate captain; Roster updated 2009-02-04; NLL Transactions

== See also ==
- 2011 NLL season
