= 2011 Rochester Knighthawks season =

2011 Rochester Knighthawks
- League: NLL
- Division: 4th East
- 2011 record: 10-6
- Home record: 4-4
- Road record: 6-2
- Goals for: 176
- Goals against: 159
- General Manager: Curt Styres
- Coach: Mike Hasen
- Captain: Shawn Williams
- Arena: Blue Cross Arena

Team leaders
- Goals: Cody Jamieson (28)
- Assists: Shawn Williams (54)
- Points: Shawn Williams (77)
- Penalties in minutes: Kyle Laverty (45)
- Loose Balls: Pat McCready (101)
- Wins: Matt Vinc (10)
- Goals against average: Matt Vinc (9.77)

The Rochester Knighthawks were a lacrosse team based in Rochester, New York, that played in the National Lacrosse League (NLL). The 2011 season was the 17th in franchise history. The Knighthawks finished tied with Buffalo and Toronto with the top record in the East, but finished in third place due to tiebreakers. They lost to the eventual champion Toronto Rock in the Division Semifinals.

== Regular season ==
=== Conference standings ===
East Division
P	Team	GP	W	L	PCT	GB	Home	Road	GF	GA	Diff	GF/GP	GA/GP
1	Buffalo Bandits – xy	16	10	6	.625	0.0	4–4	6–2	169	159	+10	10.56	9.94
2	Toronto Rock – x	16	10	6	.625	0.0	7–1	3–5	187	168	+19	11.69	10.50
3	Rochester Knighthawks – x	16	10	6	.625	0.0	4–4	6–2	176	159	+17	11.00	9.94
4	Boston Blazers – x	16	8	8	.500	2.0	4–4	4–4	166	155	+11	10.38	9.69
5	Philadelphia Wings	16	5	11	.312	5.0	2–6	3–5	143	179	−36	8.94	11.19

West Division
P	Team	GP	W	L	PCT	GB	Home	Road	GF	GA	Diff	GF/GP	GA/GP
1	Calgary Roughnecks – xyz	16	11	5	.688	0.0	6–2	5–3	198	181	+17	12.38	11.31
2	Minnesota Swarm – x	16	8	8	.500	3.0	5–3	3–5	187	180	+7	11.69	11.25
3	Washington Stealth – x	16	8	8	.500	3.0	3–5	5–3	203	198	+5	12.69	12.38
4	Colorado Mammoth – x	16	5	11	.312	6.0	3–5	2–6	151	172	−21	9.44	10.75
5	Edmonton Rush	16	5	11	.312	6.0	4–4	1–7	175	204	−29	10.94	12.75

x: Clinched playoff berth; c: Clinched playoff berth by crossing over to another division; y: Clinched division; z: Clinched best regular season record; GP: Games Played
W: Wins; L: Losses; GB: Games back; PCT: Win percentage; Home: Record at Home; Road: Record on the Road; GF: Goals scored; GA: Goals allowed
Differential: Difference between goals scored and allowed; GF/GP: Average number of goals scored per game; GA/GP: Average number of goals allowed per game

== Game log ==
Game	Date	Opponent	Location	Score	OT	Attendance	Record
1	January 8, 2011	@ Minnesota Swarm	Xcel Energy Center	W 11–10	OT	8,242	1–0
2	January 15, 2011	Toronto Rock	Blue Cross Arena	L 9–12		6,025	1–1
3	January 22, 2011	@ Boston Blazers	TD Garden	W 11–10	OT	10,422	2–1
4	January 29, 2011	Boston Blazers	Blue Cross Arena	L 7–16		4,945	2–2
5	February 5, 2011	Philadelphia Wings	Blue Cross Arena	W 11–6		4,560	3–2
6	February 12, 2011	Minnesota Swarm	Blue Cross Arena	W 12–10		4,940	4–2
7	February 18, 2011	@ Toronto Rock	Air Canada Centre	L 5–10		9,408	4–3
8	February 19, 2011	Toronto Rock	Blue Cross Arena	L 6–13		5,656	4–4
9	February 26, 2011	Edmonton Rush	Blue Cross Arena	W 13–9		5,371	5–4
10	March 5, 2011	@ Buffalo Bandits	HSBC Arena	L 8–11		18,690	5–5
11	March 26, 2011	Philadelphia Wings	Blue Cross Arena	W 13–10		6,875	6–5
12	April 2, 2011	@ Boston Blazers	TD Garden	W 19–8		9,008	7–5
13	April 9, 2011	Buffalo Bandits	Blue Cross Arena	L 8–9		9,216	7–6
14	April 10, 2011	@ Philadelphia Wings	Wells Fargo Center	W 10–6		9,595	8–6
15	April 16, 2011	@ Washington Stealth	Comcast Arena at Everett	W 18–10		5,161	9–6
16	April 23, 2011	@ Buffalo Bandits	HSBC Arena	W 15–9		18,690	10–6

== Playoffs ==
=== Game log ===
Game	Date	Opponent	Location	Score	OT	Attendance	Record
Division Semifinal	May 1, 2011	Toronto Rock	Blue Cross Arena	L 8–10		10,228	0–1

== Roster ==
2011 Rochester Knighthawks roster
Active (21-man) roster		Inactive roster	Coaches
Goaltenders: 48 (Canada) Matt Vinc; 77 (Canada) Aaron Bold; Defensemen: 7 (Canada) Tyler Burton; 10 (Canada) Pat McCready; 12 (Canada) Troy Bonterre; 25 (United States) Scott Ditzell; 40 (Canada) Ian Rubel; 71 (Canada) Kyle Laverty; 79 (Haudenosaunee) Sid Smith; -- (United States) Mike Kirk; -- (United States) Jack Reid	Forwards: 9 (Haudenosaunee) Craig Point; 15 (Canada) Shawn Evans; 22 (Canada) Gary Gait; 42 (Canada) Jarrett Davis; 44 (Canada) Mike Accursi (A); 51 (Canada) Shawn Williams (C); 88 (Haudenosaunee) Cody Jamieson; -- (United States) Casey Powell; Transition: 1 (United States) Joe Walters; 2 (United States) Chris Schiller (A); 3 (Canada) Josh Ruys; 4 (Canada) Joel McCready; 5 (United States) Matt Zash; 93 (Canada) Chris Driscoll	Practice squad: 12 (Haudenosaunee) Cody Johnson; 16 (Canada) Dylan Evans; 83 (Haudenosaunee) Chandon Hill; Injured reserve: 20 (Canada) Jordan Hall; 43 (Haudenosaunee) Marshall Abrams; Holdout: 23 (Canada) Cory Vitarelli	Head coach {{{Head Coach}}} Legend: * Suspended list; (C) Captain; (A) Alternate captain; updated 2011-1-16; NLL Transactions

== See also ==
- 2011 NLL season
