= Mike Lines =

American lacrosse coach (born 1970)

Mike Lines (born August 30, 1970) is the former head coach of the National Lacrosse League's Minnesota Swarm. He was replaced by Joe Sullivan.

== Minnesota Swarm ==
=== 2010 ===
Despite leading the Swarm to a 5-11 record during the 2010 regular season, it was good enough to earn the fourth playoff spot in the Western Division. However, Mike Lines' Minnesota Swarm fell the first-seeded Washington Stealth, the team that eventually won the championship that year, 14-10.

=== 2011 ===
Lines led the Swarm to a 2-1 start as of January 23, 2011. After the season, Lines was replaced by Joe Sullivan.

== NLL head coaching statistics ==
Team	Season	Regular Season				Playoffs				Playoff result
Team	Season	GC	W	L	W%	GC	W	L	W%	Playoff result
Minnesota Swarm	2010	16	5	11	.313	1	0	1	.000	Lost Division Semifinal (WSH)
Minnesota Swarm	2011	16	8	8	.500	1	0	1	.000	Lost Division Semifinal (WSH)
Minnesota Swarm	2012	6	3	3	.500	–	–	–	–	Fired
Totals:	3	38	16	22	.421	2	0	2	.000	
