= 2012 Washington Stealth season =

2012 Washington Stealth
- League: NLL
- Division: 5th West
- 2012 record: 4-12
- Home record: 2-6
- Road record: 2-6
- Goals for: 179
- Goals against: 204
- General Manager: Doug Locker
- Coach: Art Webster (interim)
- Captain: Jason Bloom
- Alternate captains: Kyle Sorensen; Cam Sedgwick
- Arena: Comcast Arena at Everett

Team leaders
- Goals: Lewis Ratcliff (36)
- Assists: Rhys Duch (46)
- Points: Rhys Duch (79)
- Penalties in minutes: Matt Beers (48)
- Loose Balls: Bob Snider (202)
- Wins: Tyler Richards (3)
- Goals against average: Tyler Richards (12.70)

The Washington Stealth are a lacrosse team based in Everett, Washington. The team plays in the National Lacrosse League (NLL). The 2012 season was the third season in Washington, and the 13th in franchise history.

Before the season, head coach Chris Hall was diagnosed with throat cancer and missed the entire season. Defensive co-ordinator Art Webster took over head coaching duties for the season.

== Regular season ==
=== Conference standings ===
East Division
P	Team	GP	W	L	PCT	GB	Home	Road	GF	GA	Diff	GF/GP	GA/GP
1	Toronto Rock – xy	16	9	7	.562	0.0	3–5	6–2	198	196	+2	12.38	12.25
2	Rochester Knighthawks – x	16	7	9	.438	2.0	5–3	2–6	191	197	−6	11.94	12.31
3	Philadelphia Wings – x	16	7	9	.438	2.0	3–5	4–4	176	207	−31	11.00	12.94
4	Buffalo Bandits – x	16	7	9	.438	2.0	4–4	3–5	198	204	−6	12.38	12.75

West Division
P	Team	GP	W	L	PCT	GB	Home	Road	GF	GA	Diff	GF/GP	GA/GP
1	Calgary Roughnecks – xyz	16	12	4	.750	0.0	5–3	7–1	216	170	+46	13.50	10.62
2	Colorado Mammoth – x	16	11	5	.688	1.0	5–3	6–2	217	201	+16	13.56	12.56
3	Minnesota Swarm – x	16	9	7	.562	3.0	6–2	3–5	202	190	+12	12.62	11.88
4	Edmonton Rush – x	16	6	10	.375	6.0	4–4	2–6	167	175	−8	10.44	10.94
5	Washington Stealth	16	4	12	.250	8.0	2–6	2–6	179	204	−25	11.19	12.75

x: Clinched playoff berth; c: Clinched playoff berth by crossing over to another division; y: Clinched division; z: Clinched best regular season record; GP: Games Played
W: Wins; L: Losses; GB: Games back; PCT: Win percentage; Home: Record at Home; Road: Record on the Road; GF: Goals scored; GA: Goals allowed
Differential: Difference between goals scored and allowed; GF/GP: Average number of goals scored per game; GA/GP: Average number of goals allowed per game

== Game log ==
Game	Date	Opponent	Location	Score	OT	Attendance	Record
1	January 14, 2012	Calgary Roughnecks	Comcast Arena at Everett	L 10–13		4,687	0–1
2	January 21, 2012	@ Philadelphia Wings	Wells Fargo Center	L 9–10	OT	8,024	0–2
3	January 28, 2012	Edmonton Rush	Comcast Arena at Everett	L 5–16		4,168	0–3
4	February 4, 2012	@ Buffalo Bandits	First Niagara Center	W 11–10	OT	14,577	1–3
5	February 10, 2012	Calgary Roughnecks	Comcast Arena at Everett	L 11–12		3,509	1–4
6	February 18, 2012	@ Rochester Knighthawks	Blue Cross Arena	L 12–15		6,163	1–5
7	February 24, 2012	Minnesota Swarm	Comcast Arena at Everett	L 7–15		3,755	1–6
8	March 3, 2012	@ Toronto Rock	Air Canada Centre	W 14–9		10,530	2–6
9	March 10, 2012	@ Colorado Mammoth	Pepsi Center	L 11–13		17,116	2–7
10	March 11, 2012	Colorado Mammoth	Comcast Arena at Everett	W 11–8		3,919	3–7
11	March 24, 2012	@ Edmonton Rush	Rexall Place	L 9–10		6,853	3–8
12	March 25, 2012	Minnesota Swarm	Comcast Arena at Everett	W 20–13		3,618	4–8
13	March 31, 2012	@ Calgary Roughnecks	Scotiabank Saddledome	L 11–13		8,203	4–9
14	April 14, 2012	@ Minnesota Swarm	Xcel Energy Center	L 9–14		8,239	4–10
15	April 20, 2012	Toronto Rock	Comcast Arena at Everett	L 13–16		3,846	4–11
16	April 28, 2012	Buffalo Bandits	Comcast Arena at Everett	L 16–17		3,770	4–12

== Transactions ==
=== Trades ===
July 15, 2011	To Washington Stealth 3rd round pick, 2011 entry draft 2nd round pick, 2012 entry draft	To Buffalo Bandits Luke Wiles
July 25, 2011	To Washington Stealth Kyle Ross	To Toronto Rock Matt Roik
February 13, 2012	To Washington Stealth Athan Iannucci; 2nd round pick in 2012 Entry Draft	To Edmonton Rush Paul Rabil; 1st round pick in 2012 Entry Draft
March 20, 2012	To Washington Stealth 3rd round pick in 2013 Entry Draft	To Rochester Knighthawks Jamison Koesterer

=== Dispersal Draft ===
The Stealth chose the following players in the Boston Blazers dispersal draft:

Round	Overall	Player
1	8	Jamie Rooney
2	17	Josh Wasson
3	26	Dan Teat

=== Entry draft ===
The 2011 NLL Entry Draft took place on September 21, 2011. The Stealth selected the following players:

Round	Overall	Player	College/Club
3	21	Mike Mallory	Delta, BC
3	22	Adam McGourty	Brampton, ON
4	34	Trevor Moore	Robert Morris
5	43	Brett Hickey	Windsor, ON
6	52	Justin Salt	New Westminster, BC

== Roster ==
2012 Washington Stealth roster
Active (21-man) roster		Inactive roster	Coaches
Goaltenders: 31 (Canada) Kevin Croswell; 34 (Canada) Matt King; 00 (Canada) Tyler Richards; Defensemen: 2 (Canada) Matt Beers; 47 (Canada) Jason Bloom (C); 23 (Canada) Mike Grimes; 6 (Canada) Curtis Hodgson; 25 (United States) Eric Martin; 44 (Canada) Chris McElroy; 3 (Canada) Jeff Moleski; 24 (United States) Chris O'Dougherty; 17 (Canada) Justin Salt; 11 (Canada) Kyle Sorenson (A)	Forwards: 26 (Haudenosaunee) Brett Bucktooth; 10 (Canada) Rhys Duch; 73 (Haudenosaunee) Dean Hill; 83 (Canada) Athan Iannucci; 42 (Canada) Lewis Ratcliff; 27 (Canada) Cliff Smith; 67 (Canada) Jeff Zywicki; Transition: 18 (United States) Kyle Hartzell; 21 (Canada) Chet Koneczny; 97 (Canada) Kyle Ross; 41 (Canada) Bob Snider	Practice squad: 55 (Canada) Martin Cummings; 88 (Canada) Mike Mallory; 32 (Canada) Chris Seidel	Head coach {{{Head Coach}}} Legend: * Suspended list; (C) Captain; (A) Alternate captain; updated 2012-01-14; NLL Transactions

== See also ==
- 2012 NLL season
