= 2011 Colorado Mammoth season =

2011 Colorado Mammoth
- League: NLL
- Division: 4th West
- 2011 record: 5-11
- Home record: 3-5
- Road record: 2-6
- Goals for: 151
- Goals against: 172
- General Manager: Steve Govett
- Coach: Bob Hamley
- Captain: John Gallant
- Alternate captains: Bruce Murray; Nick Carlson
- Arena: Pepsi Center

Team leaders
- Goals: John Grant, Jr. (36)
- Assists: John Grant, Jr. (47)
- Points: John Grant, Jr. (83)
- Penalties in minutes: Mac Allen (55)
- Loose Balls: Ilija Gajic (101)
- Wins: Chris Levis (5)
- Goals against average: Chris Levis (9.99)

The Colorado Mammoth are a lacrosse team based in Denver, Colorado playing in the National Lacrosse League (NLL). The 2011 season was the 25th in franchise history and 9th as the Mammoth (previously the Washington Power, Pittsburgh Crossefire, and Baltimore Thunder).

The Mammoth lost their first 5 games at home, continuing their home futility streak to 13 games before defeating the Boston Blazers in overtime. They subsequently won their next two home games, and finished the season 5-11 and in 4th place in the West. The Mammoth lost 10–6 to the Calgary Roughnecks in the Division Semifinal.

== Regular season ==
=== Conference standings ===
East Division
P	Team	GP	W	L	PCT	GB	Home	Road	GF	GA	Diff	GF/GP	GA/GP
1	Buffalo Bandits – xy	16	10	6	.625	0.0	4–4	6–2	169	159	+10	10.56	9.94
2	Toronto Rock – x	16	10	6	.625	0.0	7–1	3–5	187	168	+19	11.69	10.50
3	Rochester Knighthawks – x	16	10	6	.625	0.0	4–4	6–2	176	159	+17	11.00	9.94
4	Boston Blazers – x	16	8	8	.500	2.0	4–4	4–4	166	155	+11	10.38	9.69
5	Philadelphia Wings	16	5	11	.312	5.0	2–6	3–5	143	179	−36	8.94	11.19

West Division
P	Team	GP	W	L	PCT	GB	Home	Road	GF	GA	Diff	GF/GP	GA/GP
1	Calgary Roughnecks – xyz	16	11	5	.688	0.0	6–2	5–3	198	181	+17	12.38	11.31
2	Minnesota Swarm – x	16	8	8	.500	3.0	5–3	3–5	187	180	+7	11.69	11.25
3	Washington Stealth – x	16	8	8	.500	3.0	3–5	5–3	203	198	+5	12.69	12.38
4	Colorado Mammoth – x	16	5	11	.312	6.0	3–5	2–6	151	172	−21	9.44	10.75
5	Edmonton Rush	16	5	11	.312	6.0	4–4	1–7	175	204	−29	10.94	12.75

x: Clinched playoff berth; c: Clinched playoff berth by crossing over to another division; y: Clinched division; z: Clinched best regular season record; GP: Games Played
W: Wins; L: Losses; GB: Games back; PCT: Win percentage; Home: Record at Home; Road: Record on the Road; GF: Goals scored; GA: Goals allowed
Differential: Difference between goals scored and allowed; GF/GP: Average number of goals scored per game; GA/GP: Average number of goals allowed per game

== Game log ==
Game	Date	Opponent	Location	Score	OT	Attendance	Record
1	January 8, 2011	Washington Stealth	Pepsi Center	L 10–11	OT	17,029	0–1
2	January 15, 2011	@ Calgary Roughnecks	Scotiabank Saddledome	W 8–7		9,346	1–1
3	January 22, 2011	Philadelphia Wings	Pepsi Center	L 10–11		16,034	1–2
4	January 29, 2011	@ Philadelphia Wings	Wells Fargo Center	L 11–12		8,616	1–3
5	February 5, 2011	Washington Stealth	Pepsi Center	L 8–10		14,091	1–4
6	February 12, 2011	@ Boston Blazers	TD Garden	L 6–11		8,462	1–5
7	February 18, 2011	@ Washington Stealth	Comcast Arena at Everett	L 7–20		3,160	1–6
8	February 20, 2011	Minnesota Swarm	Pepsi Center	L 10–12		15,825	1–7
9	March 4, 2011	Minnesota Swarm	Pepsi Center	L 10–11	OT	13,957	1–8
10	March 26, 2011	Boston Blazers	Pepsi Center	W 9–8	OT	17,123	2–8
11	April 1, 2011	@ Edmonton Rush	Rexall Place	L 10–14		7,092	2–9
12	April 2, 2011	Edmonton Rush	Pepsi Center	W 7–6		15,027	3–9
13	April 8, 2011	@ Calgary Roughnecks	Scotiabank Saddledome	L 13–14		12,213	3–10
14	April 9, 2011	@ Edmonton Rush	Rexall Place	W 13–6		7,164	4–10
15	April 15, 2011	Calgary Roughnecks	Pepsi Center	W 11–7		17,841	5–10
16	April 23, 2011	@ Minnesota Swarm	Xcel Energy Center	L 8–12		9,623	5–11

== Playoffs ==
=== Game log ===
Game	Date	Opponent	Location	Score	OT	Attendance	Record
Division Semifinal	April 30, 2011	@ Calgary Roughnecks	Scotiabank Saddledome	L 6–10		10,092	0–1

== Roster ==
2011 Colorado Mammoth roster
Active (21-man) roster		Inactive roster	Coaches
Goaltenders: 30 (Canada) Chris Levis; 35 (Canada) Matt King; Defensemen: 5 (Canada) Ben Davies; 7 (Canada) Mac Allen; 11 (Canada) John Gallant (C); 14 (United States) Steve Forsythe; 28 (United States) Tom Ethington; 66 (Canada) Matt Leveque; 88 (Canada) Ian Hawksbee	Forwards: 00 (Canada) Connor Martin; 1 (United States) Jed Prossner; 4 (United States) Ned Crotty; 6 (United States) Brian Langtry (A); 9 (Canada) Gavin Prout; 10 (Canada) Alex Gajic; 24 (Canada) John Grant Jr. (A); 44 (Canada) Dan Carey; 65 (Canada) Jamie Floris; 96 (Canada) Joel Dalgarno; Transition: 8 (Canada) Nick Carlson; 12 (United States) Jarett Park; 17 (Canada) Steve Toll; 19 (Canada) Ilija Gajic	Practice squad: 15 (Canada) Tim Campeau; 26 (Canada) Brad Richardson; (Canada) Ron Schibild; Injured reserve: 72 (United States) Ken Clausen; Holdout: 18 (Canada) Derek Malawsky; (Canada) Marc Brown; (Canada) Matt Davenport; (Canada) Ray Guze; (Canada) Matthew Wilson	Head coach {{{Head Coach}}} Legend: * Suspended list; (C) Captain; (A) Alternate captain; updated 2011-05-03; NLL Transactions

== See also ==
- 2011 NLL season
