= 2012 Buffalo Bandits season =

2012 Buffalo Bandits
- League: NLL
- Division: 4th East
- 2012 record: 7–9
- Home record: 4–4
- Road record: 3–5
- Goals for: 198
- Goals against: 204
- General Manager: David Zygaj
- Coach: Darris Kilgour
- Captain: Chris White
- Alternate captains: John Tavares
- Arena: First Niagara Center

Team leaders
- Goals: John Tavares (41)
- Assists: John Tavares (39)
- Points: John Tavares (80)
- Penalties in minutes: Brandon Francis (69)
- Loose Balls: Scott Self (78)
- Wins: Michael Thompson (4)
- Goals against average: Anthony Cosmo (12.41)

The Buffalo Bandits are a lacrosse team based in Buffalo, New York, playing in the National Lacrosse League (NLL). The 2012 season was their 21st season in the NLL.

The Bandits finished last in the East with a 7–9 record, but qualified for the playoffs. Buffalo would go on to lose to the Toronto Rock in the Division Semifinal, 7–6. This was the first season since 1999 where the Bandits finished the season with a losing record.

== Standings ==
East Division
P	Team	GP	W	L	PCT	GB	Home	Road	GF	GA	Diff	GF/GP	GA/GP
1	Toronto Rock – xy	16	9	7	.562	0.0	3–5	6–2	198	196	+2	12.38	12.25
2	Rochester Knighthawks – x	16	7	9	.438	2.0	5–3	2–6	191	197	−6	11.94	12.31
3	Philadelphia Wings – x	16	7	9	.438	2.0	3–5	4–4	176	207	−31	11.00	12.94
4	Buffalo Bandits – x	16	7	9	.438	2.0	4–4	3–5	198	204	−6	12.38	12.75

West Division
P	Team	GP	W	L	PCT	GB	Home	Road	GF	GA	Diff	GF/GP	GA/GP
1	Calgary Roughnecks – xyz	16	12	4	.750	0.0	5–3	7–1	216	170	+46	13.50	10.62
2	Colorado Mammoth – x	16	11	5	.688	1.0	5–3	6–2	217	201	+16	13.56	12.56
3	Minnesota Swarm – x	16	9	7	.562	3.0	6–2	3–5	202	190	+12	12.62	11.88
4	Edmonton Rush – x	16	6	10	.375	6.0	4–4	2–6	167	175	−8	10.44	10.94
5	Washington Stealth	16	4	12	.250	8.0	2–6	2–6	179	204	−25	11.19	12.75

x: Clinched playoff berth; c: Clinched playoff berth by crossing over to another division; y: Clinched division; z: Clinched best regular season record; GP: Games Played
W: Wins; L: Losses; GB: Games back; PCT: Win percentage; Home: Record at Home; Road: Record on the Road; GF: Goals scored; GA: Goals allowed
Differential: Difference between goals scored and allowed; GF/GP: Average number of goals scored per game; GA/GP: Average number of goals allowed per game

=== Game log ===
Game	Date	Opponent	Location	Score	OT	Attendance	Record
1	January 14, 2012	Toronto Rock	First Niagara Center	W 14–10		16,356	1–0
2	January 21, 2012	@ Rochester Knighthawks	Blue Cross Arena	W 12–9		9,776	2–0
3	January 27, 2012	Philadelphia Wings	First Niagara Center	L 10–13		14,492	2–1
4	January 28, 2012	@ Minnesota Swarm	Xcel Energy Center	L 11–19		8,232	2–2
5	February 4, 2012	Washington Stealth	First Niagara Center	L 10–11	OT	14,577	2–3
6	February 12, 2012	@ Philadelphia Wings	Wells Fargo Center	L 13–14		8,119	2–4
7	March 3, 2012	Colorado Mammoth	First Niagara Center	L 13–16		15,845	2–5
8	March 10, 2012	@ Rochester Knighthawks	Blue Cross Arena	L 10–13		7,254	2–6
9	March 16, 2012	@ Toronto Rock	Air Canada Centre	W 21–14		12,153	3–6
10	March 17, 2012	Minnesota Swarm	First Niagara Center	W 13–10		15,003	4–6
11	March 24, 2012	@ Calgary Roughnecks	Scotiabank Saddledome	L 6–17		7,687	4–7
12	March 31, 2012	Toronto Rock	First Niagara Center	L 9–15		15,322	4–8
13	April 7, 2012	Philadelphia Wings	First Niagara Center	W 17–7		15,060	5–8
14	April 14, 2012	@ Edmonton Rush	Rexall Place	L 8–11		6,897	5–9
15	April 21, 2012	Rochester Knighthawks	First Niagara Center	W 14–9		18,690	6–9
16	April 28, 2012	@ Washington Stealth	Comcast Arena at Everett	W 17–16	OT	3,770	7–9

== Playoffs ==
=== Game log ===
Game	Date	Opponent	Location	Score	OT	Attendance	Record
Division Semifinal	May 5, 2012	@ Toronto Rock	Air Canada Centre	L 6–7		9,472	0–1

== Player stats ==
=== Runners (Top 10) ===
Player	GP	G	A	Pts	LB	PIM
John Tavares	16	41	39	80	53	8
Luke Wiles	16	39	31	70	71	4
Mark Steenhuis	16	27	35	62	75	38
Mat Giles	14	18	31	49	43	33
Chad Culp	16	16	30	46	59	24
Kevin Buchanan	15	10	19	29	63	0
Tracey Kelusky	12	12	16	28	37	2
Roger Vyse	9	10	13	23	21	0
Scott Self	16	6	11	17	78	8
Tom Montour	9	3	9	12	72	25
Totals		198	293	491	1,075	521

=== Goaltenders ===
Player	GP	MIN	W	L	GA	Sv%	GAA
Anthony Cosmo	10	382:02	3	3	79	.759	12.41
Mike Thompson	16	525:45	4	4	109	.753	12.44
Angus Goodleaf	6	62:50	0	2	14	.708	13.37
Totals		970:37	7	9	202	.753	12.49

== Transactions ==
=== Trades ===
July 15, 2011	To Buffalo Bandits Luke Wiles	To Washington Stealth 3rd round pick, 2011 entry draft 2nd round pick, 2012 entry draft
September 9, 2011	To Buffalo Bandits 2nd round pick in 2011 Entry Draft - Jeremy Thompson; Conditional 1st round pick in 2012 Entry Draft	To Edmonton Rush Chris Corbeil
October 25, 2011	To Buffalo Bandits Mat Giles	To Minnesota Swarm 4th round pick, 2013 entry draft
February 10, 2012	To Buffalo Bandits 2nd round pick in 2012 Entry Draft; 2nd round pick in 2014 Entry Draft	To Edmonton Rush Jeff Cornwall
February 16, 2012	To Buffalo Bandits Anthony Cosmo	To Minnesota Swarm 1st round pick, 2013 entry draft 1st round pick, 2014 entry draft

=== Dispersal draft ===
The Bandits chose the following players in the Boston Blazers dispersal draft:

Round	Overall	Player
1	6	Kevin Buchanan
2	15	Damon Edwards

=== Entry draft ===
The 2011 NLL Entry Draft took place on September 21, 2011. The Bandits selected the following players:

Round	Overall	Player	College/Club
2	9	Jeremy Thompson	Syracuse University
2	15	Jeff Cornwall	Port Coquitlam, BC
3	24	Connor Daly	Burlington, ON
3	25	Jerome Thompson	Onondaga C.C.
4	33	Billy Bitter	University of North Carolina
5	41	Dwight Bero	Dartmouth College
6	51	Lloyd Chrysler	Tuscarora University

== Roster ==
2012 Buffalo Bandits roster
Active (21-man) roster		Inactive roster	Coaches
Goaltenders: 44 (Canada) Anthony Cosmo; 66 (Haudenosaunee) Michael Thompson; Defensemen: 19 (Canada) Darryl Gibson; 88 (Canada) Travis Irving; 2 (Canada) Ian Llord; 23 (Canada) Steve Priolo; 4 (Canada) Scott Self; 3 (Haudenosaunee) Billy Dee Smith; 6 (Canada) Chris White (C)	Forwards: 33 (United States) Kevin Buchanan; 20 (Canada) Chad Culp; 84 (Haudenosaunee) Brandon Francis; 27 (Canada) Mat Giles; 17 (Canada) Tracey Kelusky; 11 (Canada) John Tavares (A); 81 (Haudenosaunee) Roger Vyse; 15 (Canada) Luke Wiles; Transition: 7 (Canada) Jon Harasym; 63 (Haudenosaunee) Thomas Montour; 9 (Canada) Mark Steenhuis; 74 (Haudenosaunee) Jeremy Thompson; 75 (Canada) Jay Thorimbert	Practice squad: 10 (Canada) Mike McNamara; Injured reserve: -- (Canada) Matt Friedman; -- (Haudenosaunee) Ken Montour; Unable to play: -- (Canada) Kyle Clancy	Head coach {{{Head Coach}}} Legend: * Suspended list; (C) Captain; (A) Alternate captain; Roster updated 2011-2-27; NLL Transactions

== See also ==
- 2012 NLL season
