= 2011 Toronto Rock season =

2011 Toronto Rock
- Champion's Cup Champions
- East Division Champions
- League: NLL
- Division: 2nd East
- 2011 record: 10-6
- Home record: 7-1
- Road record: 3-5
- Goals for: 187
- Goals against: 168
- General Manager: Terry Sanderson
- Coach: Troy Cordingley
- Captain: Colin Doyle
- Alternate captains: Sandy Chapman; Blaine Manning; Phil Sanderson
- Arena: Air Canada Centre
- Average attendance: 10,985

Team leaders
- Goals: Stephan Leblanc (33)
- Assists: Blaine Manning (52)
- Points: Stephan Leblanc (76)
- Penalties in minutes: Kyle Ross (29)
- Loose Balls: Cam Woods (95)
- Wins: Bob Watson (10)
- Goals against average: Bob Watson (10.09)

The Toronto Rock are a lacrosse team based in Toronto playing in the National Lacrosse League (NLL). The 2011 season was the 15th in franchise history, and 14th as the Rock. The Rock won the championship on May 15 defeating the Washington Stealth 8-7. They tied the NLL record with their 6th victory.

== Regular season ==
=== Conference standings ===
East Division
P	Team	GP	W	L	PCT	GB	Home	Road	GF	GA	Diff	GF/GP	GA/GP
1	Buffalo Bandits – xy	16	10	6	.625	0.0	4–4	6–2	169	159	+10	10.56	9.94
2	Toronto Rock – x	16	10	6	.625	0.0	7–1	3–5	187	168	+19	11.69	10.50
3	Rochester Knighthawks – x	16	10	6	.625	0.0	4–4	6–2	176	159	+17	11.00	9.94
4	Boston Blazers – x	16	8	8	.500	2.0	4–4	4–4	166	155	+11	10.38	9.69
5	Philadelphia Wings	16	5	11	.312	5.0	2–6	3–5	143	179	−36	8.94	11.19

West Division
P	Team	GP	W	L	PCT	GB	Home	Road	GF	GA	Diff	GF/GP	GA/GP
1	Calgary Roughnecks – xyz	16	11	5	.688	0.0	6–2	5–3	198	181	+17	12.38	11.31
2	Minnesota Swarm – x	16	8	8	.500	3.0	5–3	3–5	187	180	+7	11.69	11.25
3	Washington Stealth – x	16	8	8	.500	3.0	3–5	5–3	203	198	+5	12.69	12.38
4	Colorado Mammoth – x	16	5	11	.312	6.0	3–5	2–6	151	172	−21	9.44	10.75
5	Edmonton Rush	16	5	11	.312	6.0	4–4	1–7	175	204	−29	10.94	12.75

x: Clinched playoff berth; c: Clinched playoff berth by crossing over to another division; y: Clinched division; z: Clinched best regular season record; GP: Games Played
W: Wins; L: Losses; GB: Games back; PCT: Win percentage; Home: Record at Home; Road: Record on the Road; GF: Goals scored; GA: Goals allowed
Differential: Difference between goals scored and allowed; GF/GP: Average number of goals scored per game; GA/GP: Average number of goals allowed per game

=== Game log ===
Game	Date	Opponent	Location	Score	OT	Attendance	Record
1	January 8, 2011	Edmonton Rush	Air Canada Centre	W 13–7		11,564	1–0
2	January 15, 2011	@ Rochester Knighthawks	Blue Cross Arena	W 12–9		6,025	2–0
3	January 21, 2011	Boston Blazers	Air Canada Centre	W 15–14	OT	9,104	3–0
4	January 22, 2011	@ Buffalo Bandits	HSBC Arena	L 14–15	OT	16,685	3–1
5	January 29, 2011	Buffalo Bandits	Air Canada Centre	W 8–5		10,812	4–1
6	February 5, 2011	@ Boston Blazers	TD Garden	L 7–9		7,598	4–2
7	February 12, 2011	Calgary Roughnecks	Air Canada Centre	W 9–8	OT	10,364	5–2
8	February 18, 2011	Rochester Knighthawks	Air Canada Centre	W 10–5		9,408	6–2
9	February 19, 2011	@ Rochester Knighthawks	Blue Cross Arena	W 13–6		5,656	7–2
10	February 26, 2011	@ Philadelphia Wings	Wells Fargo Center	W 16–13		7,082	8–2
11	March 4, 2011	Philadelphia Wings	Air Canada Centre	W 15–10		10,120	9–2
12	March 25, 2011	@ Calgary Roughnecks	Scotiabank Saddledome	L 9–14		10,075	9–3
13	April 1, 2011	Washington Stealth	Air Canada Centre	W 13–12	OT	11,424	10–3
14	April 2, 2011	@ Philadelphia Wings	Wells Fargo Center	L 11–12		9,044	10–4
15	April 8, 2011	Buffalo Bandits	Air Canada Centre	L 8–11		15,084	10–5
16	April 16, 2011	@ Edmonton Rush	Rexall Place	L 14–18		7,340	10–6

== Playoffs ==
=== Game log ===
Game	Date	Opponent	Location	Score	OT	Attendance	Record
Division Semifinal	May 1, 2011	Rochester Knighthawks	Air Canada Centre	W 10–8		10,228	1–0
Division Final	May 7, 2011	@ Buffalo Bandits	HSBC Arena	W 12–11		12,349	2–0
Championship Game	May 14, 2011	Washington Stealth	Air Canada Centre	W 8–7		14,488	3–0

== Roster ==
2011 Toronto Rock roster
Active (21-man) roster		Inactive roster	Coaches
Goaltenders: 37 (Canada) Pat Campbell; 29 (Canada) Bob Watson; Defensemen: 5 (Canada) Sandy Chapman (A); 4 (Canada) Jeff Gilbert; 44 (Canada) Stephen Hoar; 11 (Canada) Mike Hobbins; 14 (Canada) Rob Marshall; 9 (Canada) Patrick Merrill; 56 (Canada) Drew Petkoff; 8 (Canada) Creighton Reid; 97 (Canada) Kyle Ross; 18 (Canada) Phil Sanderson (A); 22 (Canada) Cam Woods	Forwards: 33 (Canada) Kasey Beirnes; 13 (Canada) Garrett Billings; 7 (Canada) Colin Doyle (C); 10 (Canada) Rob Hellyer; 17 (Canada) Stephan Leblanc; 15 (Canada) Mat MacLeod; 42 (Canada) Pat Maddalena; 16 (Canada) Blaine Manning (A); 77 (Canada) Tim O'Brien; 93 (Canada) Aaron Pascas	Practice squad: 38 (Canada) Gee Nash; Injured reserve: 26 (Canada) Ryan Sharp	Head coach {{{Head Coach}}} Legend: * Suspended list; (C) Captain; (A) Alternate captain; Roster updated 2011-01-30; NLL Transactions

== See also ==
- 2011 NLL season
