= Cam Sedgwick =

Canadian lacrosse player

- Born: February 14, 1978 (age 47); Vancouver, British Columbia, Canada
- Nationality: Canadian
- Height: 6 ft 0 in (1.83 m)
- Weight: 190 pounds (86 kg)
- Position: Forward
- NLL team Former teams: Washington Stealth; Vancouver Ravens
- Pro career: 1998–

Cam Sedgwick (born February 14, 1978, in Vancouver, British Columbia) is a professional lacrosse player for the Washington Stealth of the National Lacrosse League. He played his last game on Saturday, April 28, 2012

== NLL career ==
Cam Sedgwick was originally drafted by the Toronto Rock (second round 13th overall) in 1998. He played three seasons for Vancouver Ravens (2002–04) prior to joining Stealth. Sedgwick was named Rookie of the Month (January 2003) as a member of the Ravens. He scored 48 points (16 goals, 32 assists) for Vancouver in 2003. Sedgwick was selected first round (third overall) by Arizona in the Vancouver Dispersal Draft in 2004. He is now retired playing his last game Saturday April 28

== WLA career ==
Sedgwick has played for the Burnaby Lakers in the Western Lacrosse Association (2001–present). He won the Commissioner's Trophy as the League's Most Valuable Player in 2007 and 2008. Sedwick scored 52 points (27 goals, 25 assists) and was third in the league with 26 playoff points in 2008.
