= Drew Westervelt =

American lacrosse player (born 1985)

Personal information
- Nationality: American
- Born: April 25, 1985 (age 41) Bel Air, Maryland, U.S.
- Height: 6 ft 5 in (196 cm)
- Weight: 235 lb (107 kg; 16 st 11 lb)

Sport
- Position: Attack
- NLL draft: 37th overall, 2007; Philadelphia Wings
- NLL team Former teams: Colorado Mammoth; Philadelphia Wings
- MLL team Former teams: New York Lizards; Chesapeake Bayhawks, Denver Outlaws
- Pro career: 2007–

Drew Westervelt (born April 25, 1985 in Bel Air, Maryland) is an American former professional lacrosse player in the National Lacrosse League and Major League Lacrosse.

== College career ==
Westervelt attended the University of Maryland, Baltimore County, where, as a senior, he was the nation's fifth-leading scorer.

== Entrepreneurship ==
In April 2014, Westervelt launched a new company HEX Performance based in Baltimore, Maryland. The company produces "HEX" removes that sweaty smell leftover in performance synthetic fabrics. HEX is now being sold at Wegmans, Whole Foods Market, Harris Teeter, Shoprite, and Canadian Tire.

== Professional career ==
=== MLL ===
Westervelt was selected by the Denver Outlaws fourth overall in the 2007 MLL Collegiate Draft.

In 2011 he was traded to the Chesapeake Bayhawks, then in 2016 to the New York Lizards.

=== NLL ===
He was acquired by the Philadelphia Wings in the third round (37th overall) in the 2007 National Lacrosse League entry draft. During the 2009 NLL season, he was named to the All-Star Game as an injury replacement.

On September 13, 2013, Westervelt was traded to the Colorado Mammoth for Ryan Hotaling and draft picks. He was not included in the published final roster for Colorado, so his status with that team is not known.

== Statistics ==
=== MLL ===
		Regular Season							Playoffs
Season	Team	GP	G	2ptG	A	Pts	LB	PIM	GP	G	2ptG	A	Pts	LB	PIM
2007	Denver	10	20	0	14	34	16	2	1	2	0	1	3	1	1
2008	Denver	12	24	0	8	32	12	1.5	2	1	0	0	1	1	1
2009	Denver	12	27	2	17	46	11	8.5	2	0	0	1	1	1	0
MLL Totals		34	71	2	39	112	39	12	5	3	0	2	5	3	2

=== NLL ===
		Regular Season						Playoffs
Season	Team	GP	G	A	Pts	LB	PIM	GP	G	A	Pts	LB	PIM
2008	Philadelphia	7	5	4	9	21	16	1	0	0	0	1	0
2009	Philadelphia	16	34	19	53	72	16	-	-	-	-	-	-
2010	Philadelphia	16	32	40	72	87	15	-	-	-	-	-	-
2011	Philadelphia	15	27	27	54	50	14	-	-	-	-	-	-
2012	Philadelphia	16	36	19	55	59	12	1	2	0	2	4	0
2013	Philadelphia	16	30	29	59	60	25	1	2	2	4	3	2
NLL totals		86	164	138	302	349	98	3	4	2	6	8	4

=== University of Maryland, Baltimore County ===
Season	GP	G	A	Pts	PPG
2004	14	23	15	38	2.71
2005	15	27	23	50	3.33
2006	15	27	20	47	3.13
2007	17	35	36	71	4.18
Totals	61	112	94	206	3.38
