= Aaron Wilson (lacrosse) =

Canadian lacrosse player (born 1980)

Personal information
- Nickname: Wild Man
- Nationality: British
- Born: December 20, 1980 (age 45) Kitchener, Ontario, Canada
- Height: 5 ft 9 in (175 cm)
- Weight: 175 lb (79 kg; 12 st 7 lb)

Sport
- Position: Forward
- Shoots: Right
- NLL draft: 14th overall, 2000; Albany Attack
- NLL team Former teams: Edmonton Rush; Rochester Knighthawks; Toronto Rock; Minnesota Swarm; Buffalo Bandits
- Pro career: 2003–

Aaron Wilson (born December 20, 1980, in Kitchener, Ontario) is a Canadian professional box lacrosse player for the Edmonton Rush in the National Lacrosse League.

Wilson began his career with the Toronto Rock. After six seasons with the Rock, including a Championship in 2005, Wilson was traded to the Rochester Knighthawks. After only six games with the Knighthawks, Wilson was traded again, this time to the Minnesota Swarm for former rookie of the year Craig Point and Dean Hill.

Following the 2011 season, Wilson was traded to the Edmonton Rush along with Ryan Cousins and Kevin Croswell for a number of draft picks.

== Statistics ==
=== NLL ===
Aaron Wilson		Regular season									Playoffs								
Season	Team	GP	G	A	Pts	LB	PIM	Pts/GP	LB/GP	PIM/GP	GP	G	A	Pts	LB	PIM	Pts/GP	LB/GP	PIM/GP
2003	Toronto Rock	14	21	16	37	59	6	2.64	4.21	0.43	–	–	–	–	–	–	–	–	–
2004	Toronto Rock	13	24	18	42	58	6	3.23	4.46	0.46	1	3	2	5	6	0	5.00	6.00	0.00
2005	Toronto Rock	16	41	33	74	99	6	4.63	6.19	0.38	2	3	6	9	14	0	4.50	7.00	0.00
2006	Toronto Rock	16	39	21	60	98	15	3.75	6.13	0.94	1	0	1	1	7	0	1.00	7.00	0.00
2007	Toronto Rock	16	37	34	71	110	17	4.44	6.88	1.06	1	0	3	3	15	0	3.00	15.00	0.00
2008	Toronto Rock	16	28	22	50	90	4	3.13	5.63	0.25	–	–	–	–	–	–	–	–	–
2009	Rochester Knighthawks	6	9	6	15	20	0	2.50	3.33	0.00	–	–	–	–	–	–	–	–	–
2009	Minnesota Swarm	10	22	21	43	46	6	4.30	4.60	0.60	–	–	–	–	–	–	–	–	–
2010	Minnesota Swarm	16	40	49	89	73	6	5.56	4.56	0.38	1	3	0	3	1	0	3.00	1.00	0.00
2011	Minnesota Swarm	16	23	34	57	35	8	3.56	2.19	0.50	1	1	2	3	6	0	3.00	6.00	0.00
2012	Edmonton Rush	16	13	18	31	52	15	1.94	3.25	0.94	3	5	9	14	11	2	4.67	3.67	0.67
2013	Buffalo Bandits	16	23	23	46	53	4	2.88	3.31	0.25	–	–	–	–	–	–	–	–	–
2014	Buffalo Bandits	8	8	5	13	30	9	1.63	3.75	1.13	–	–	–	–	–	–	–	–	–
2015	Rochester Knighthawks	4	3	7	10	9	8	2.50	2.25	2.00	–	–	–	–	–	–	–	–	–
		183	331	307	638	832	110	3.49	4.55	0.60	10	15	23	38	60	2	3.80	6.00	0.20
Career Total:		193	346	330	676	892	112	3.50	4.62	0.58									

GP–Games played; G–Goals; A–Assists; Pts–Points; LB–Loose balls; PIM–Penalty minutes; Pts/GP–Points per games played; LB/GP–Loose balls per games played; PIM/GP–Penalty minutes per games played.
