= Marty O'Neill =

Marty O'Neill (born June 6, 1964, in Winnipeg, Manitoba) is a former box lacrosse goaltender and former General Manager of the Minnesota Swarm (2004-2011) and Philadelphia Wings (2001-2004) of the National Lacrosse League (NLL). As a goaltender, O'Neill joined the Boston Blazers of the Major Indoor Lacrosse League (predecessor of the NLL) in 1993. O'Neill played eight season of professional lacrosse, five seasons with the Boston Blazers, one with the Syracuse Smash, and two with the Buffalo Bandits before retiring after the 2000 season. He was voted the Blazer's MVP by his teammates in Boston for both the 1994 and 1995 seasons.

O'Neill was hired as the General Manager of the Philadelphia Wings in June 2001, and amassed a Championship roster that was decimated by expansion of four teams and retirement of Dan Radebaugh and Jay Jalbert. During his time with the Wings, he led them to only one playoff appearance in three years with an overall record of 23-26 and was fired after the 2004 season. Only three months later, O'Neill was hired by the Minnesota Swarm to be their first-ever GM. The Swarm finished 5th and missed the playoffs in their first year, but improved their record and made the playoffs in each of the next three seasons. For his efforts, O'Neill was named NLL GM of the Year in both 2007 and 2008, becoming the first multiple winner of the award.

O'Neill played 11 seasons with the Victoria Shamrocks of the Western Lacrosse Association Senior "A" League, one season in the Major Series Lacrosse with the Six Nations Chiefs, and two seasons of Sr. B lacrosse with the Ladner Pioneers in Ladner, British Columbia. With the Shamrocks, O'Neill won 2 Mann Cups (1997, 1999), and 1 with Six Nations (1995). As a Senior lacrosse player, O'Neill played 162 games in net with 110 assists and 193 penalty minutes. During this time, in the playoffs O'Neil played 82 games, scored 1 goal (1996), 51 assists, and had 148 penalty minutes. O'Neill did not play Junior Lacrosse and was a walk on for the Senior "A" Victoria Payless in 1987.

O'Neill has been involved in the design and production of box lacrosse equipment since 1997 with Maximum Lacrosse, also known as Maxlax.

== Statistics ==
=== NLL ===
| | | Regular Season | | | | | | Playoffs |
| Season | Team | GP | Min | GA | Sv | GAA | Sv % | GP | Min | GA | Sv | GAA | Sv % |
|---|---|---|---|---|---|---|---|---|---|---|---|---|---|
| 1990 | Pittsburgh | 0 | 0 | 0 | 0 | 0 | -- | -- | -- | -- | -- | -- | -- |
| 1993 | Boston | 8 | 477 | 108 | 272 | 13.58 | 71.58% | 4 | 236 | 34 | 112 | 8.64 | 76.71% |
| 1994 | Boston | 8 | 480 | 91 | 252 | 11.38 | 73.47% | -- | -- | -- | -- | -- | -- |
| 1995 | Boston | 7 | 402 | 71 | 231 | 10.60 | 76.49% | 1 | 60 | 10 | 25 | 10.00 | 71.43% |
| 1996 | Boston | 10 | 530 | 99 | 265 | 11.21 | 72.80% | 1 | 59 | 10 | 35 | 10.17 | 77.78% |
| 1997 | Boston | 10 | 545 | 119 | 260 | 13.09 | 68.60% | -- | -- | -- | -- | -- | -- |
| 1998 | Syracuse | 10 | 456 | 139 | 296 | 18.29 | 68.05% | -- | -- | -- | -- | -- | -- |
| 1999 | Buffalo | 8 | 385 | 90 | 256 | 14.03 | 73.99% | -- | -- | -- | -- | -- | -- |
| 2000 | Buffalo | 5 | 161 | 43 | 92 | 16.07 | 68.15% | 1 | 45 | 8 | 22 | 10.60 | 73.33% |
| NLL totals | | 66 | 3,436 | 760 | 1,924 | 13.27 | 71.68% | 7 | 400 | 62 | 194 | 9.29 | 75.78% |

=== Junior/Senior ===
| | | | Regular Season | | | | | | Playoffs |
| Season | Team | League | GP | Min | GA | Sv | GAA | Sv % | GP | Min | GA | Sv | GAA | Sv % |
|---|---|---|---|---|---|---|---|---|---|---|---|---|---|---|
| 1987 | Victoria | WLA | 13 | | | | | | -- | -- | -- | -- | -- | -- |
| 1988 | Victoria | WLA | 14 | | | | | | 4 |
| 1989 | Victoria | WLA | 9 | | | | | | 2 |
| 1990 | Victoria | WLA | 14 | | | | | | 4 |
| 1991 | Victoria | WLA | 18 | | | | | | 5 |
| 1992 | Victoria | WLA | 17 | | | | | | 5 |
| 1994 | Victoria | WLA | 18 | 954 | 132 | 512 | 8.30 | 79.50% | 6 |
| 1995 | Six Nations | OLA | 9 | | | | | | 12 |
| 1996 | Victoria | WLA | 12 | 629 | 105 | 326 | 10.02 | 75.63% | 8 |
| 1997 | Victoria | WLA | 12 | | | | | | 10 |
| 1998 | Victoria | WLA | 11 | 596 | 82 | 386 | 8.25 | 81.77% | 12 |
| 1999 | Victoria | WLA | 13 | 676 | 103 | 337 | 9.14 | 76.59% | 3 |
| 2002 | Ladner | WCSLA | 2 | | | | | | 1 |
| 2004 | Ladner | WCSLA | 5 | | | | | | -- | -- | -- | -- | -- | -- |
| Senior Totals | | | 162 | | | | | | 82 |

== Awards ==
| Preceded by Derek Keenan | NLL GM of the Year; 2007, 2008 | Succeeded by Ed Comeau |
