= Nick Patterson (lacrosse) =

Canadian lacrosse player (born 1982)

Personal information
- Nationality: Canadian
- Born: December 8, 1982 (age 43) Vancouver, British Columbia
- Height: 5 ft 11 in (180 cm)
- Weight: 215 lb (98 kg; 15 st 5 lb)

Sport
- Position: Goaltender
- Shoots: Right
- NLL draft: 19th overall, 2002; Vancouver Ravens
- NLL teams: Washington Stealth; Minnesota Swarm; Vancouver Ravens
- Pro career: 2003–2013

Nick Patterson (born December 8, 1982, in Vancouver, British Columbia) is a Canadian former professional box lacrosse goaltender. Patterson played parts of 11 seasons in the NLL, mostly with the Minnesota Swarm. He won the Defensive Player of the Week award four times, and was named to the second All-Pro team in both 2006 and 2007.

== Statistics ==
=== NLL ===
		Regular Season						Playoffs
Season	Team	GP	Min	GA	Sv	GAA	Sv %	GP	Min	GA	Sv	GAA	Sv %
2003	Vancouver	2	0	0	0	0.00	0.00%	--	--	--	--	--	--
2004	Vancouver	16	228	55	149	14.46	73.04%	--	--	--	--	--	--
2005	Minnesota	10	89	23	62	15.51	72.94%	--	--	--	--	--	--
2006	Minnesota	11	525	91	342	10.41	78.98%	1	17	6	11	20.75	64.71%
2007	Minnesota	16	656	125	430	11.43	77.48%	1	59	14	41	14.16	74.55%
2008	Minnesota	16	905	181	598	11.99	76.80%	1	60	11	33	11.30	75.00%
2009	Minnesota	16	444	100	249	13.62	71.30%	--	--	--	--	--	--
2010	Minnesota	16	756	155	459	12.29	74.80%	1	21	14	7	19.72	50.00%
2011	Minnesota	16	812	150	497	11.08	76.80%	1	60	14	38	14.00	73.10%
2012	Minnesota	1	60	20	30	20.00	60.00%	--	--	--	--	--	--
2013	Washington	9	114	32	75	16.81	70.10%	--	--	--	--	--	--
NLL totals		128	4,587	924	2891	12.08	75.80%	5	218	51	130	14.01	71.80%
