= Rory Smith (lacrosse) =

Canadian lacrosse player

Personal information
- Nickname: The Mimico Mauler
- Born: February 1, 1987 (age 39) Etobicoke, Ontario, Canada
- Height: 6 ft 0 in (183 cm)
- Weight: 200 lb (91 kg; 14 st 4 lb)

Sport
- Position: Defense
- Shoots: Left
- NLL draft: 17th overall, 2007; New York Titans
- NLL team Former teams: Vancouver Warriors; Buffalo Bandits; Colorado Mammoth; Minnesota Swarm; Orlando Titans; New York Titans
- CLA team Former teams: Victoria Shamrocks; New Westminster Salmonbellies
- Pro career: 2008–2016

Rory Smith (born February 1, 1987) is a Canadian former professional lacrosse player. Smith was known as an enforcer, and has racked up over 1,000 career penalty minutes during his amateur and professional career. His 104 penalty minutes with Orlando in 2010 is the record for most penalty minutes in a single season in NLL history.

Smith began his amateur career with the Jr. B Mimico Mountaineers, and was named league MVP in 2006. He played for the Jr. A Brampton Excelsiors from 2007 to 2008. He made his Sr. A debut in 2009 with the New Westminster Salmonbellies of the Western Lacrosse Association, and helped them to two Mann Cup appearances in 2009 and 2010. He moved back east in 2012 to play for the MSL Chiefs, with whom he won back-to-back Mann Cups in 2013 and 2014.

Smith was drafted in the second round of the 2007 NLL Entry Draft by the New York Titans. He played with the Titans in New York for two years and in Orlando for one year, before the franchise was dissolved. He was then selected fourth overall by the Minnesota Swarm in the 2010 Dispersal Draft, and played with the Swarm for one year. He was then traded, along with Jon Sullivan and Sean Pollock, to the Colorado Mammoth for the third overall pick in the 2011 Dispersal Draft. He played the next two seasons with the Mammoth before being traded to the Buffalo Bandits for Carter Bender. After one season in Buffalo, he was again traded, along with Eric Penney, to the Vancouver Stealth in exchange for Nick Weiss. He played his final season in 2016 with Vancouver.

== Personal life ==
Smith was born in Etobicoke, Ontario and lived in the neighbourhood of Mimico and attended York University. Smith played junior hockey for the St. Michael's Buzzers with his younger brothers Brendan and Reilly. Both Brendan and Reilly play professional ice hockey.
