= Brendan Mundorf =

American lacrosse player (born 1984)

Personal information
- Nationality: Australian; United States
- Born: July 27, 1984 (age 42) Baltimore, Maryland, U.S.
- Height: 5 ft 11 in (180 cm)
- Weight: 195 lb (88 kg; 13 st 13 lb)

Sport
- Position: Attack
- NCAA team: UMBC
- NLL draft: 11th overall, 2006; New York Titans
- NLL team Former teams: Philadelphia Wings; Orlando Titans
- MLL team Former teams: Chesapeake Bayhawks; Denver Outlaws
- Pro career: 2006–2017
Medal record
Representing United States
Men's lacrosse
World Lacrosse Championship
Winner	2010 Manchester
Runner-up	2014 Denver
Representing Australia
Men's lacrosse
World Lacrosse Championship
Third place	2006 London

Brendan Mundorf (born July 27, 1984) is an Australian-American lacrosse player who played for the Denver Outlaws of Major League Lacrosse and the Philadelphia Wings of the National Lacrosse League.

== Early years ==
Brendan Mundorf was born on July 27, 1984, in Ellicott City, Maryland, to an Australian father and American mother. He later attended Mount Saint Joseph High School in Baltimore.

== College career ==
During Mundorf's career at UMBC he was a four-year starter and earned America East Player of the Year in his junior and senior season. He led the Retrievers to back-to-back America East regular season titles in his junior and senior season. In his final season he helped the Retrievers go undefeated and earn a berth in the NCAA Tournament. He graduated with a degree in sociology.

== NLL career ==
Mundorf was a first-round draft pick (11th overall) by the Titans in the 2007 NLL Entry Draft. He was awarded Rookie of the Week Honors in Week 10 of the 2007 season. During the 2009 NLL season, he was named to the All-Star Game as an injury replacement. He was picked 3rd in the 2010 Orlando Titans dispersal draft by the Philadelphia Wings.

== MLL career ==
Drafted by Denver 21st overall in the 2006 MLL Collegiate Draft.

Rookie Season: Played 9 games with the Outlaws as a rookie, ranking fourth on the club with 22 goals on 75 shots. Posted 7 assists to finish with 29 points. Named Cascade MLL Rookie of the Week for the 6 goals he scored vs. San Francisco.

2007: Appeared in 12 games with Denver, finishing with 36 goals and 11 assists for 47 points...His 36 goals led the team and tied for second in the league, while his point total led the team and tied for sixth in the league...Turned in an 8-point performance (5 goals, 3 assists.) vs. LA. Earned MVP honors in the Independence Day game with 5 goals and 1 assist vs. the Chicago Machine.

2008: Played 12 games and paced the Outlaws with 30 goals on 83 shots (52 on goal)...Added 14 assists to finished second on the team and seventh in the league with 44 points...Participated in his second MLL All-Star Game.

2009: Appeared in 12 games with Denver and led the team with 34 goals on 75 shots (49 on goal) with 10 assists...Ranked second on the team and tied fourth for league with 44 points. Added 15 groundballs. Named Bud Light MVP Honoree of the week four times...Earned MLL Offensive Player of the Week honors on May 26...Named to his third MLL All Star Game.

2010: Played 11 games with the Outlaws and tied for the team lead with 22 goals on a team-high 83 shots (38 on goal). Added 16 assists to finish with a team-best 38 points. Scored 4 power-play goals, netted 2 game-winning goals and picked up 15 groundballs. Earned MLL Offensive Player of the Week honors after scoring 4 goals and adding 1 assist vs. Chicago.

2011: Played in 11 games with the Outlaws. Led the team with 45 points, 30 goals, and 15 assists. Recovered 23 groundballs. Played in 1 playoff game, scoring 1 goal and 1 assist for a total of 2 points as well as 1 groundball. Played in his fourth MLL All-Star game, representing Team Warrior. Contributed 1 goal, 3 assists, and 2 groundballs.

2012: Played in 12 games for the Denver Outlaws. Led the team with 32 goals, 27 assists, and 59 total points. Finished second in the MLL in goals and fourth is assists. Helped Outlaws increase attendance once again. Named as the 2012 MLL Season Most Valuable Player.

2013: Acquired by the Bayhawks in a trade with the Denver Outlaws according to head coach Dave Cottle."We have been trying to get Brendan for the last four years and are excited to finally be able to keep him here locally," Cottle stated. "He plays with great competitive toughness and we are reuniting him with his college teammate Drew Westervelt." Appeared in just 8 games for the Bayhawks as he was hampered by an ailing knee injury. Tied for fourth on the team in points with 27, including 20 goals and seven assists.

Mundorf retired from professional lacrosse in 2017.

== International career ==
Mundorf played for Team Australia in the 2006 World Lacrosse Championships, but in the 2010 and 2014 Championships he represented Team USA.

== Statistics ==
=== NLL ===
		Regular Season						Playoffs
Season	Team	GP	G	A	Pts	LB	PIM	GP	G	A	Pts	LB	PIM
2007	New York	14	23	21	44	50	12	--	--	--	--	--	--
2008	New York	13	23	23	46	39	8	2	4	3	7	14	0
2009	New York	16	28	31	59	36	2	3	7	8	15	10	0
2011	Philadelphia	15	16	34	50	75	12	--	--	--	--	--	--
2012	Philadelphia	16	28	44	72	58	12	1	4	3	7	3	0
NLL totals		74	118	153	271	212	46	5	15	14	29	27	0

=== MLL ===
		Regular Season
Season	Team	GP	G	2ptG	A	Pts	GB	PIM
2006	Denver	9	22	0	7	29	21	0
2007	Denver	12	36	0	11	47	20	3.5
2008	Denver	12	30	0	14	44	15	3
2009	Denver	12	34	0	10	44	15	1
2010	Denver	11	22	0	16	38	15	4
2011	Denver	11	30	0	15	45	23	6
2012	Denver	12	32	0	27	59	15	5
2013	Denver	11	23	0	18	41	9	4
2014	Chesapeake	8	20	0	7	27	7	4
MLL Totals		98	249	0	125	374	140	30.5

=== UMBC ===
Season	GP	G	A	Pts	PPG
2003	13	22	11	33	2.54
2004	14	33	15	48	3.43
2005	15	29	28	57	3.80
2006	15	28	19	47	3.13
Totals	57	112	73	185	3.25

== Accomplishments ==
- America East Player of the Year 2005 & 2006
- Most Outstanding Player in America East Tournament 2006
- Two-time Division I All American at UMBC
- 21st overall pick in 2006 MLL draft
- 11th overall pick in 2007 NLL Entry Draft
- 10 game-winning goals in MLL
- 2012 MLL MVP
- Denver Outlaws Career Leader in Points
- Played in 2006, 2010, 2014 World Lacrosse Championships (Earned Gold medal in 2010 WLC)
- Has held endorsements with the following reputable companies: Battle Sports Science, Go Pro Workouts, Rockin Refuel and STX
