= Andrew Watt (lacrosse) =

Canadian lacrosse player

Personal information
- Born: January 9, 1984 (age 42) Kitchener, Ontario, Canada
- Height: 6 ft 1 in (185 cm)
- Weight: 205 lb (93 kg; 14 st 9 lb)

Sport
- Position: Transition
- Shoots: Left
- NLL draft: 8th overall, 2008; Minnesota Swarm
- NLL team Former teams: Buffalo Bandits (2014-present); Minnesota Swarm (2009-2013)
- MSL team Former teams: Peterborough Lakers (2012-present); Six Nations Chiefs (2011); Kitchener-Waterloo Kodiaks (2006-2009)
- Pro career: 2009–

Andrew Watt (born January 9, 1984) is a Canadian professional lacrosse player for the Buffalo Bandits of the National Lacrosse League and the Peterborough Lakers of Major Series Lacrosse. Born in Kitchener, Ontario, Watt began his career with the hometown Kitchener-Waterloo Braves of the Ontario Junior A Lacrosse League, with whom he played from 2001 to 2005. Watt was eventually called up to the Kitchener-Waterloo Kodiaks, and has also played for the Six Nations Chiefs before continuing his MSL career with the Lakers. He played collegiality at Robert Morris University

Watt was drafted in the first round of the 2010 NLL Entry Draft by the Minnesota Swarm, and spent five years with the Swarm before being dealt, along with Ryan Benesch, to the Buffalo Bandits in exchange for first round picks in 2015 and 2016 as well a third round pick in 2017.
