= Ryan Cousins =

Canadian lacrosse player (born 1981)

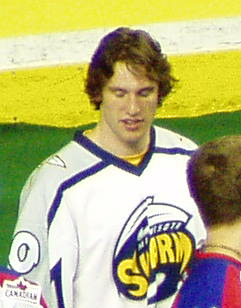
- Cousins with the Minnesota Swarm in 2009

Personal information
- Born: April 1, 1981 (age 45) Toronto, Ontario, Canada
- Height: 6 ft 1 in (185 cm)
- Weight: 200 lb (91 kg; 14 st 4 lb)

Sport
- Position: Defenseman
- Shoots: Right
- NLL draft: 5th overall, 2001; Columbus Landsharks
- NLL teams: Rochester Knighthawks; Minnesota Swarm; Arizona Sting; Columbus Landsharks
- Pro career: 2002–2012

Ryan Cousins (born April 1, 1981 in Toronto, Ontario) is a Canadian former professional lacrosse player. Cousins played for eleven seasons in the National Lacrosse League, winning a championship in 2012 with the Rochester Knighthawks. He was selected to play in the National Lacrosse League All-Star Game in both 2004 and 2005. Cousins plays for the Victoria Shamrocks of the WLA in the offseason.

Cousins was awarded the National Lacrosse League Defensive Player of the Year Award in both the 2007 and 2008 seasons. During the 2009 NLL season, he was named a reserve to the All-Star game.

In July 2011, Cousins was traded to the Edmonton Rush, along with Aaron Wilson and Kevin Croswell, in exchange for a number of entry draft picks. Three months later, Cousins was traded again, this time to the Rochester Knighthawks. The Rush sent Cousins, Alex Kedoh Hill, and Andy Secore to Rochester for Knighthawks captain Shawn Williams and Aaron Bold.

Cousins suffered a knee injury prior to the 2012 season, and was considering retirement, but was convinced by the Knighthawks to return. Cousins' decision paid off, as the Knighthawks won the 2012 NLL Championship. After suffering another injury prior to the 2013 season, Cousins announced his retirement in February, 2013.

== Statistics ==
=== NLL ===
		Regular Season						Playoffs
Season	Team	GP	G	A	Pts	LB	PIM	GP	G	A	Pts	LB	PIM
2002	Columbus	12	0	1	1	59	13	--	--	--	--	--	--
2003	Columbus	12	0	2	2	31	13	--	--	--	--	--	--
2004	Arizona	13	2	3	5	29	17	--	--	--	--	--	--
2005	Minnesota	16	5	4	9	48	45	--	--	--	--	--	--
2006	Minnesota	14	2	6	8	65	32	1	0	1	1	4	0
2007	Minnesota	16	9	14	23	108	16	1	2	0	2	5	2
2008	Minnesota	16	9	5	14	87	36	1	0	0	0	9	0
2009	Minnesota	15	4	3	7	87	20	--	--	--	--	--	--
2010	Minnesota	7	0	4	4	33	16	--	--	--	--	--	--
2011	Minnesota	7	0	5	5	20	2	1	0	0	0	0	0
2012	Rochester	10	1	1	2	31	6	3	1	0	1	8	0
NLL totals		138	32	48	80	598	216	7	3	1	4	26	2

== Awards ==
Preceded by Brodie Merrill	NLL Defensive Player of the Year; 2007, 2008	Succeeded by Billy Dee Smith
