= Minnesota Swarm =

Former NLL professional box lacrosse team

- Division: Eastern/Western
- Team history: Montreal Express (2002)
- Based in: St. Paul, Minnesota
- Arena: Xcel Energy Center
- Colors: Yellow, Blue, White
- Owner: John and Andy Arlotta
- Head coach: Joe Sullivan
- General manager: John Arlotta
- Local media: KARE, KFAN (AM), KXXR
- Later: Georgia Swarm

The Minnesota Swarm was a box lacrosse team in the National Lacrosse League who played at the Xcel Energy Center in Saint Paul, Minnesota from 2004 until 2015. The team's previous owners (Minnesota Sports & Entertainment) who also own the NHL's Minnesota Wild purchased the rights to the inactive Montreal Express team on August 10, 2004. The name Swarm was selected over Thrill, Rush and Bullheads on October 25, 2004.

On July 16, 2008, John J. Arlotta and his son Andy Arlotta were officially announced as the team's new owners. On May 22, 2015, The Swarm announced that they would be relocating for the 2016 NLL Season. On May 29, they announced that they would play in Duluth, Georgia, for the 2016 season as the Georgia Swarm.

== History ==
=== 2004–2015 ===
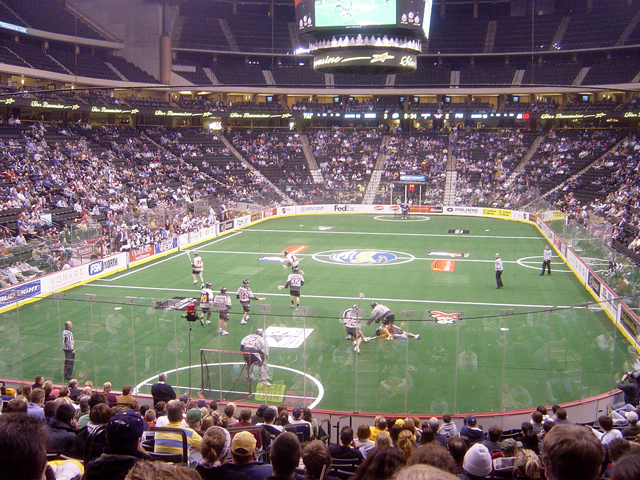
A Swarm game at Xcel Energy Center against the Philadelphia Wings on February 10, 2006

The Minnesota Swarm played their first exhibition game on December 10, 2004 against the Colorado Mammoth. The team drew over 14,000 fans — a record for an NLL preseason game very common for NHL ownership in the league. The Swarm's first regular season game was in Rochester against the Knighthawks on January 1, 2005, in which the Swarm won 12–11. Craig Conn scored the first goal in franchise history. Their first home regular season game was January 21, 2005 against the Buffalo Bandits. The coach of the team for the first season was Mike Simpson and the general manager was Marty O'Neill. Later on the swarm was sold to Arlotta family which eventually moved the franchise to Georgia.

Forward Craig Conn and defenseman Ryan Cousins were named reserves for the East Division All-Star Team at the 2005 NLL All Star Game. Ryder Bateman ranked tied for second among NLL rookies in goals and third in scoring. The team finished the season with a 5–11 record. In August 2005, Adam Mueller was named as the head coach of the team.

The Swarm made the NLL playoffs after the 2006 season with an 8–8 record. In July 2006 Adam Mueller resigned as coach and was replaced on August 1 by Duane Jacobs. In 2007 the Swarm improved to a 9–7 record, again making the playoffs. General Manager Marty O'Neill was named NLL GM of the Year.

As a promotional stunt for the 2007 season opener, local sports newscaster Eric Perkins signed a one-game contract to play for the Swarm. Commercials were aired on NBC showing Perkins at a news conference taunting the Chicago Shamrox. He did end up getting 8 seconds of playing time in the 11–10 loss. In 2008, The Swarm announced that they would be retiring Perkins' number 66.

In Week 7 of the 2008 NLL season, the Swarm established a league record by running up a 12–0 lead before the New York Titans broke their scoreless streak in the third quarter of the contest. For the third year in a row, the Swarm improved their record over the previous season, finishing with a 10–6 record. They lost to the New York Titans in the division semi-finals, but GM Marty O'Neill was once again named NLL GM of the Year, becoming the only multiple winner of this award.

Minnesota finished the 2009 season with a 6–10 record. The team failed to make it to the playoffs for the second time in franchise history. Kevin Buchanan led all Swarm rookies in goals (22), assists (23) and points (45). He received NLL Rookie of the Week honors twice and was named to the All-Rookie Team. After serving as an assistant coach from 2008–09, Mike Lines was named as head coach of the Swarm in August 2009.

The Swarm finished the 2010 season with a 5–11 record, and advanced to the postseason where it fell 14–10 to the eventual NLL Champion Washington Stealth in the first round of the playoffs. During the 2010 season, Minnesota had three of the league's Top 10 scorers in Callum Crawford, Aaron Wilson, and Ryan Benesch. Callum Crawford also set two Swarm records by tallying 96 points and 64 assists during the season.

Improving to an 8–8 record in the 2011 season, the Swarm advanced to the playoffs and was defeated 14–8 by the Washington Stealth for the second consecutive year in the first round of the playoffs. Ryan Benesch led the league as the Top Scorer with 95 points and also led the league with 46 goals, setting a new Swarm record. Representing the Swarm in the Western Division All-Star game, Ryan Benesch and Nick Patterson were selected as starters for the team and Callum Crawford and Andrew Watt were named as reserves.

=== Relocation to Georgia ===
On May 22, 2015, team owner John Arlotta announced that the Xcel Energy Center, home of the Swarm, did not renew the contract for the team. Instead of negotiating for a new lease, the Swarm began looking for more profitable states to relocate to.

Announced in a press release, Arlotta stated that, "The sport of lacrosse is growing at a rapid pace in Georgia and we're thrilled to bring the fastest game on two feet at the professional level to the arena at Gwinnett Center." Arlotta also added: "We have to be on a forward trajectory," and "We need to find an arena that works better for an individual owner."

The Swarm announced on May 29 that they would be relocating to Georgia for the upcoming 2016 NLL season. The Swarm will now play in the 13,000-seat Arena at Gwinnett Center in Duluth, Georgia, as the Georgia Swarm.

Movement to bring the NLL back to Minnesota

On May 23, 2015 an effort was launched by fans of the former Minnesota Swarm called 'Bring back the NLL to Minnesota'. Its purpose was to express discontent with the league and owners of the Swarm for moving the team, and to rally supporters to bring a new NLL team to the Twin Cities.

== Awards and honors ==
Year	Player	Award
2012	Andrew Suitor	Transition Player of the Year
2012	John Arlotta	GM of the Year
2012	Joe Sullivan	Les Bartley Award
2012	Andy Arlotta	Executive of the Year Award
2012	Jake Elliott	Tom Borrelli Award
2011	Ryan Benesch	NLL Scoring Title
2009	John J. Arlotta	Executive of the Year
2008	Marty O'Neill	GM of the Year
2008	Tom Garrity	Executive of the Year
2008	Ryan Cousins	Defensive Player of the Year
2008	Craig Point	Rookie of the Year
2007	Marty O'Neill	GM of the Year
2007	Ryan Cousins	Defensive Player of the Year

== All-time record ==
As Minnesota Swarm

Season	Division	W-L	Finish	Home	Road	GF	GA	Coach	Playoffs
2005	Eastern	5–11	5th	2-6	3-5	188	231	Mike Simpson	Missed playoffs
2006	Eastern	8–8	4th	3-5	5-3	158	171	Adam Mueller	Lost in division semifinals
2007	Eastern	9–7	3rd	4-4	5-3	200	207	Duane Jacobs	Lost in division semifinals
2008	Eastern	10–6	2nd	6-2	4-4	199	176	Duane Jacobs	Lost in division semifinals
2009	Western	6–10	5th	2-6	4-4	174	198	Duane Jacobs	Missed playoffs
2010	Western	5–11	4th	3-5	2-6	189	201	Mike Lines	Lost in division semifinals
2011	Western	8–8	2nd	5-3	3-5	187	180	Mike Lines	Lost in division semifinals
2012	Western	9–7	3rd	6-2	3-5	202	190	Mike Lines; Joe Sullivan	Lost in division finals
2013	Western	7–9	5th	5-3	2-6	219	202	Joe Sullivan	Lost in division finals
2014	Eastern	4–14	5th	2-7	2-7	180	219	Joe Sullivan	Missed playoffs
2015	Eastern	6–12	4th	3-6	3-6	185	226	Joe Sullivan	Missed playoffs
Total	11 seasons	77–103		41–49	36–54	1,981	2,210		
Playoff Totals		2–7		0–3	2–4	91	110		

=== Playoff results ===
Season	Game	Visiting	Home
2006	Division Semifinal	Minnesota 10	Buffalo 11
2007	Division Semifinal	Minnesota 8	Buffalo 14
2008	Division Semifinal	New York 11	Minnesota 8
2010	Division Semifinal	Minnesota 10	Washington 14
2011	Division Semifinal	Washington 14	Minnesota 8
2012	Division Semifinal	Minnesota 14	Colorado 10
2012	Division Final	Edmonton 15	Minnesota 3
2013	Division Semifinal	Minnesota 20	Toronto 11
2013	Division Final	Minnesota 10	Rochester 12

== Team records ==
Single season

Category	Player	Count	Year
Goals	Ryan Benesch	46	2011
Assists	Callum Crawford	64	2010
Points	Callum Crawford	96	2010
PIM	Travis Hill	86	2008
Loose Balls	Jordan MacIntosh	197	2013
Saves	Nick Patterson	598	2008

== Head coaching history ==
#	Name	Term	Regular season				Playoffs			
#	Name	Term	GC	W	L	W%	GC	W	L	W%
1	Mike Simpson	2005	16	5	11	.312	—	—	—	—
2	Adam Mueller	2006	16	8	8	.500	1	0	1	.000
3	Duane Jacobs	2007—2009	48	25	23	.521	2	0	2	.000
4	Mike Lines	2010—2012	38	16	22	.421	2	0	2	.000
5	Joe Sullivan	2012—2015	62	23	39	.371	4	2	2	.500
