= 2012 Edmonton Rush season =

2012 Edmonton Rush
- West Division Champions
- League: NLL
- Division: 4th West
- 2012 record: 6-10
- Home record: 4-4
- Road record: 2-6
- Goals for: 167
- Goals against: 175
- General Manager: Derek Keenan
- Coach: Derek Keenan
- Captain: Jimmy Quinlan
- Alternate captains: Brett Mydske; Derek Suddons; Ryan Ward; Shawn Williams
- Arena: Rexall Place
- Average attendance: 7,050

Team leaders
- Goals: Zack Greer (31)
- Assists: Shawn Williams (52)
- Points: Shawn Williams (68)
- Penalties in minutes: Scott Evans (52)
- Loose Balls: Kyle Rubisch (151)
- Wins: Aaron Bold (6)
- Goals against average: Aaron Bold (10.47)

The Edmonton Rush are a lacrosse team based in Edmonton playing in the National Lacrosse League (NLL). The 2012 season was the 7th in franchise history. The Rush had a tough regular season, starting 2-7 before gaining momentum in the second half. They finished 6-10 but made the playoffs. In the playoffs, however, everything changed as the Rush beat both the Calgary Roughnecks and Minnesota Swarm in dominating performances, before losing to the Rochester Knighthawks 9-6 in the championship game.

The Rush made a number of significant moves in the off-season, most notably trading captain Brodie Merrill, Dean Hill, and Mike McLellan to Philadelphia for Athan Iannucci, Alex Turner, and Brodie McDonald as well as first-round draft picks in three future drafts. They also picked up Kyle Rubisch and Ryan Dilks from the Boston Blazers dispersal draft, and Shawn Williams, Aaron Wilson, Chris Corbeil, Aaron Bold, and Kevin Croswell in other trades. This is also the first out 6 consecutive seasons in the playoffs.

== Regular season ==
=== Conference standings ===
East Division
P	Team	GP	W	L	PCT	GB	Home	Road	GF	GA	Diff	GF/GP	GA/GP
1	Toronto Rock – xy	16	9	7	.562	0.0	3–5	6–2	198	196	+2	12.38	12.25
2	Rochester Knighthawks – x	16	7	9	.438	2.0	5–3	2–6	191	197	−6	11.94	12.31
3	Philadelphia Wings – x	16	7	9	.438	2.0	3–5	4–4	176	207	−31	11.00	12.94
4	Buffalo Bandits – x	16	7	9	.438	2.0	4–4	3–5	198	204	−6	12.38	12.75

West Division
P	Team	GP	W	L	PCT	GB	Home	Road	GF	GA	Diff	GF/GP	GA/GP
1	Calgary Roughnecks – xyz	16	12	4	.750	0.0	5–3	7–1	216	170	+46	13.50	10.62
2	Colorado Mammoth – x	16	11	5	.688	1.0	5–3	6–2	217	201	+16	13.56	12.56
3	Minnesota Swarm – x	16	9	7	.562	3.0	6–2	3–5	202	190	+12	12.62	11.88
4	Edmonton Rush – x	16	6	10	.375	6.0	4–4	2–6	167	175	−8	10.44	10.94
5	Washington Stealth	16	4	12	.250	8.0	2–6	2–6	179	204	−25	11.19	12.75

x: Clinched playoff berth; c: Clinched playoff berth by crossing over to another division; y: Clinched division; z: Clinched best regular season record; GP: Games Played
W: Wins; L: Losses; GB: Games back; PCT: Win percentage; Home: Record at Home; Road: Record on the Road; GF: Goals scored; GA: Goals allowed
Differential: Difference between goals scored and allowed; GF/GP: Average number of goals scored per game; GA/GP: Average number of goals allowed per game

=== Game log ===
Game	Date	Opponent	Location	Score	OT	Attendance	Record
1	January 20, 2012	Colorado Mammoth	Rexall Place	L 12–13		8,192	0–1
2	January 28, 2012	@ Washington Stealth	Comcast Arena at Everett	W 16–5		4,168	1–1
3	February 4, 2012	@ Colorado Mammoth	Pepsi Center	L 7–11		14,055	1–2
4	February 10, 2012	@ Minnesota Swarm	Xcel Energy Center	L 9–10	OT	7,012	1–3
5	February 18, 2012	@ Calgary Roughnecks	Scotiabank Saddledome	L 8–12		8,049	1–4
6	February 24, 2012	Philadelphia Wings	Rexall Place	W 12–10		6,708	2–4
7	March 9, 2012	Calgary Roughnecks	Rexall Place	L 10–13		7,438	2–5
8	March 10, 2012	@ Calgary Roughnecks	Scotiabank Saddledome	L 9–16		8,316	2–6
9	March 17, 2012	@ Philadelphia Wings	Wells Fargo Center	L 15–16		7,524	2–7
10	March 24, 2012	Washington Stealth	Rexall Place	W 10–9		6,853	3–7
11	March 31, 2012	Minnesota Swarm	Rexall Place	W 9–8	OT	6,011	4–7
12	April 7, 2012	@ Toronto Rock	Air Canada Centre	L 8–12		14,060	4–8
13	April 14, 2012	Buffalo Bandits	Rexall Place	W 11–8		6,987	5–8
14	April 20, 2012	@ Colorado Mammoth	Pepsi Center	W 14–11		16,201	6–8
15	April 21, 2012	Calgary Roughnecks	Rexall Place	L 6–9		7,737	6–9
16	April 28, 2012	Toronto Rock	Rexall Place	L 11–12		6,478	6–10

== Playoffs ==
=== Game log ===
Game	Date	Opponent	Location	Score	OT	Attendance	Record
Division Semifinal	May 5, 2012	@ Calgary Roughnecks	Scotiabank Saddledome	W 19–11		11,161	1–0
Division Final	May 12, 2012	@ Minnesota Swarm	Xcel Energy Center	W 15–3		6,491	2–0
Championship Game	May 19, 2012	@ Rochester Knighthawks	Blue Cross Arena	L 6–9		9,344	2–1

== Transactions ==
=== Trades ===
July 13, 2011	To Edmonton Rush Aaron Wilson (F); Ryan Cousins (D); Kevin Croswell (G); *2nd round pick in 2011 Entry Draft - Jeremy Thompson (T)	To Minnesota Swarm 1st round pick in 2011 Entry Draft - Evan Kirk (G); 4th round pick in 2011 Entry Draft - Brian Karalunas (D); *2nd round pick in 2012 Entry Draft - Carter Bender (F)
August 9, 2011	To Edmonton Rush Athan Iannucci (F); Alex Turner (F); Brodie MacDonald (G); **1st round pick in 2012 Entry Draft - Kiel Matisz (F); **1st round pick in 2013 Entry Draft - Cameron Flint (T); **1st round pick in 2014 Entry Draft - Miles Thompson (F)	To Philadelphia Wings Brodie Merrill (T); Dean Hill (F); Mike McLellan (F); 5th round pick in 2011 Entry Draft - Matt Stefurak (D); 4th round pick in 2013 Entry Draft - Don Alton (G)
September 9, 2011	To Edmonton Rush Chris Corbeil (D)	To Buffalo Bandits 2nd round pick in 2011 Entry Draft - Jeremy Thompson (T); **1st round pick in 2012 Entry Draft - Kiel Matisz (F)
October 9, 2011	To Edmonton Rush Shawn Williams (F); Aaron Bold (G); ***2nd round pick in 2012 Entry Draft - Justin Pychel (D)	To Rochester Knighthawks Ryan Cousins (D); Andy Secore (F); Alex Kedoh Hill (T)
November 4, 2011	To Edmonton Rush 2nd round pick in 2012 Entry Draft - Michael Cudmore (D); *2nd round pick in 2012 Entry Draft - Jordan Critch (T)	To Toronto Rock Bill Greer (D)
February 10, 2012	To Edmonton Rush Jeff Cornwall (D)	To Buffalo Bandits 2nd round pick in 2012 Entry Draft - Jordan Critch (T); ****2nd round pick in 2014 Entry Draft - Tyson Roe (D)
February 13, 2012	To Edmonton Rush Paul Rabil (F); 1st round pick in 2012 Entry Draft - Mark Matthews (F)	To Washington Stealth Athan Iannucci (F); 2nd round pick in 2012 Entry Draft - Justin Pychel (D)

*Later traded to the Buffalo Bandits
**Later traded to the Minnesota Swarm
***Later traded to the Washington Stealth
****Later traded to the Calgary Roughnecks

=== Dispersal Draft ===
The Rush chose the following players in the Boston Blazers dispersal draft:

Round	Overall	Player
1	2	Kyle Rubisch
2	11	Ryan Dilks

=== Entry Draft ===
The 2011 NLL Entry Draft took place on September 21, 2011. The Rush drafted the following player:

Round	Overall	Player	College/Club
3	20	Jesse Fehr (T)	Duke University

== Roster ==
2012 Edmonton Rush roster
Active (21-man) roster		Inactive roster	Coaches
Goaltenders: 77 (Canada) Aaron Bold; 50 (Canada) Brodie MacDonald; Defensemen: 71 (Canada) Tyler Codron; 16 (Canada) Chris Corbeil; 13 (Canada) Jeff Cornwall; 24 (Canada) Ryan Dilks; 6 (Canada) John Lintz; 2 (Canada) Brett Mydske (A); 48 (Canada) Kyle Rubisch; 7 (Canada) Derek Suddons (A); 3 (Canada) Jarrett Toll; 17 (Canada) Steve Toll	Forwards: 19 (Canada) Scott Evans; 88 (Canada) Zack Greer; 8 (Canada) Tom Johnson; 15 (Canada) Corey Small; 44 (Canada) Ryan Ward (A); 51 (Canada) Shawn Williams (A); 10 (Canada) Aaron Wilson; Transition: 18 (Canada) Jesse Fehr; 33 (Canada) John LaFontaine; 9 (Canada) Eric Lewthwaite; 81 (Canada) Jimmy Quinlan (C)	Practice squad: 31 (Canada) Dave Marrese; 79 (Canada) Ben Prepchuk; Holdout: -- (United States) Paul Rabil; 20 (Canada) Dane Stevens	Head coach {{{Head Coach}}} Legend: * Suspended list; (C) Captain; (A) Alternate captain; Roster updated 2012-01-08; NLL Transactions

== See also ==
- 2012 NLL season
