= 2012 NLL season =

- League: National Lacrosse League
- Sport: Indoor lacrosse
- Duration: January 8, 2012 – May 19, 2012
- Games: 16
- Teams: 9
- TV partner: CBS Sports Network

Draft
- Top draft pick: Kevin Crowley
- Picked by: Philadelphia Wings

Regular season
- Top seed: Calgary Roughnecks
- Season MVP: John Grant, Jr. (Colorado Mammoth)
- Top scorer: John Grant, Jr. (Colorado Mammoth)

Playoffs
- Finals champions: Rochester Knighthawks (3rd title)
- Runners-up: Edmonton Rush
- Finals MVP: Cody Jamieson (Knighthawks)

NLL seasons
- ← 2011 season 2013 season →

The 2012 National Lacrosse League season, the 26th in the history of the NLL, began on January 8, 2012 and ended with the Championship game on May 19, 2012. The Rochester Knighthawks won their third NLL Championship, and first-ever in Rochester, defeating the Edmonton Rush 9–6 in the final game.

Mid-way through the off-season, the Boston Blazers announced that they would not be participating in the 2012 season due to problems in securing a facility in which to play. A dispersal draft was held and Dan Dawson, for the third time in his career, was the first overall pick, heading to the Philadelphia Wings. Kyle Rubisch was taken second by the Edmonton Rush, and the Minnesota Swarm chose Anthony Cosmo and Josh Sanderson with the third and fourth picks. The Swarm immediately traded Sanderson to the Toronto Rock. Casey Powell, after a knee injury in the MLL Championship game, wasn't chosen until the second round when the Rochester Knighthawks took a chance. Powell did not play in 2012 at all.

Both defending division champions got off to rough starts in 2012, as the Toronto Rock lost their first two and the Washington Stealth lost their first three. The Rock recovered and won their next three, eventually finishing atop the East division, but the Stealth had their worst season in franchise history, finishing 4-12 and the only team out of the playoffs. The Buffalo Bandits won their first two games but then went on a franchise-record six-game losing streak, during which head coach and GM Darris Kilgour called the team "stupid" and "pathetic", and said "I totally question the hearts of basically everybody but about four guys on our team". The Bandits won three of their last four games to finish in fourth place in the East and getting a first-round playoff game against the Toronto Rock.

The Colorado Mammoth only won 5 games in 2011 but in 2012, they had surpassed that total before losing a game. The Mammoth began the year winning 6 in a row and finished with an 11–5 record, good for second in the west behind the 12-5 Calgary Roughnecks. Despite having a league-high 12 rookies playing on the roster, the Minnesota Swarm surprised many finishing third with a 9–7 record.

The 2012 season will be known as a record-breaking year in the NLL. John Grant, Jr. was named league MVP for the second time in his career after scoring 116 points, breaking John Tavares' eleven-year-old single-season scoring record. Grant also scored his 500th career goal and 1000th career point during the season. Toronto Rock forward Garrett Billings finished only two points back of Grant but amassed 82 assists, breaking the old record of 74.

== Team movement ==
The Boston Blazers announced in September 2011 that they would not participate in the 2012 season. A dispersal draft was held on September 9, 2011, as the Philadelphia Wings took Blazers captain and top scorer Dan Dawson first overall.

=== Teams ===
2012 National Lacrosse League
Division	Team	City	Arena	Capacity
East	Buffalo Bandits	Buffalo, New York	First Niagara Center	18,690
East	Philadelphia Wings	Philadelphia, Pennsylvania	Wachovia Center	19,537
East	Rochester Knighthawks	Rochester, New York	Blue Cross Arena	10,662
East	Toronto Rock	Toronto, Ontario	Air Canada Centre	18,800
West	Calgary Roughnecks	Calgary, Alberta	Scotiabank Saddledome	19,289
West	Colorado Mammoth	Denver, Colorado	Pepsi Center	18,007
West	Edmonton Rush	Edmonton, Alberta	Rexall Place	16,839
West	Minnesota Swarm	Saint Paul, Minnesota	XCEL Energy Center	18,064
West	Washington Stealth	Everett, Washington	Comcast Arena at Everett	8,513

=== Map of teams ===
East Division West Division

== Final standings ==
East Division
P	Team	GP	W	L	PCT	GB	Home	Road	GF	GA	Diff	GF/GP	GA/GP
1	Toronto Rock – xy	16	9	7	.562	0.0	3–5	6–2	198	196	+2	12.38	12.25
2	Rochester Knighthawks – x	16	7	9	.438	2.0	5–3	2–6	191	197	−6	11.94	12.31
3	Philadelphia Wings – x	16	7	9	.438	2.0	3–5	4–4	176	207	−31	11.00	12.94
4	Buffalo Bandits – x	16	7	9	.438	2.0	4–4	3–5	198	204	−6	12.38	12.75

West Division
P	Team	GP	W	L	PCT	GB	Home	Road	GF	GA	Diff	GF/GP	GA/GP
1	Calgary Roughnecks – xyz	16	12	4	.750	0.0	5–3	7–1	216	170	+46	13.50	10.62
2	Colorado Mammoth – x	16	11	5	.688	1.0	5–3	6–2	217	201	+16	13.56	12.56
3	Minnesota Swarm – x	16	9	7	.562	3.0	6–2	3–5	202	190	+12	12.62	11.88
4	Edmonton Rush – x	16	6	10	.375	6.0	4–4	2–6	167	175	−8	10.44	10.94
5	Washington Stealth	16	4	12	.250	8.0	2–6	2–6	179	204	−25	11.19	12.75

x: Clinched playoff berth; c: Clinched playoff berth by crossing over to another division; y: Clinched division; z: Clinched best regular season record; GP: Games Played
W: Wins; L: Losses; GB: Games back; PCT: Win percentage; Home: Record at Home; Road: Record on the Road; GF: Goals scored; GA: Goals allowed
Differential: Difference between goals scored and allowed; GF/GP: Average number of goals scored per game; GA/GP: Average number of goals allowed per game

== Scoring leaders ==
Note: GP = Games played; G = Goals; A = Assists; Pts = Points; PIM = Penalty minutes; LB = Loose Balls

Player	Team	GP	G	A	Pts	PIM	LB
John Grant Jr.	Colorado Mammoth	14	50	66	116	24	57
Garrett Billings	Toronto Rock	16	32	82	114	4	74
Dan Dawson	Philadelphia Wings	16	25	78	103	8	58
Cody Jamieson	Rochester Knighthawks	15	36	49	85	15	56
Gavin Prout	Colorado Mammoth	14	22	61	83	26	49
Callum Crawford	Minnesota Swarm	16	25	58	83	8	56
John Tavares	Buffalo Bandits	16	41	39	80	8	53
Shawn Evans	Calgary Roughnecks	16	32	47	79	65	77
Rhys Duch	Washington Stealth	14	33	46	79	17	84
Lewis Ratcliff	Washington Stealth	16	36	40	76	13	65
Adam Jones	Colorado Mammoth	16	29	47	76	8	77

== Leading goaltenders ==
Note: GP = Games played; Mins = Minutes played; W = Wins; L = Losses: GA = Goals Allowed; SV% = Save Percentage; GAA = Goals against average

Player	Team	GP	Mins	W	L	GA	SV%	GAA
Evan Kirk	Minnesota Swarm	16	415	4	4	68	0.807	9.81
Mike Poulin	Calgary Roughnecks	14	759	10	3	130	0.789	10.27
Aaron Bold	Edmonton Rush	16	951	6	10	166	0.775	10.47
Tyler Carlson	Minnesota Swarm	15	498	5	2	100	0.748	12.04
Matt Vinc	Rochester Knighthawks	16	938	7	9	191	0.753	12.21

== Playoffs ==
Divisional Semifinal
E1	Toronto Rock	7
E4	Buffalo Bandits	6
Eastern Division
E2	Rochester Knighthawks	14
E3	Philadelphia Wings	13
W1	Calgary Roughnecks	11
W4	Edmonton Rush	19
Western Division
W2	Colorado Mammoth	10
W3	Minnesota Swarm	14

Divisional Final
E1	Toronto Rock	13
E2	Rochester Knighthawks	17
W3	Minnesota Swarm	3
W4	Edmonton Rush	15

Champion's Cup Final
E2	Rochester Knighthawks	9
W4	Edmonton Rush	6

=== Division Semifinals ===
==== (E1) Toronto Rock vs. (E4) Buffalo Bandits ====
May 5, 2012	Toronto Rock	7–6 (0–4, 2–2, 2–0, 3–0)	Buffalo Bandits	Air Canada Centre; Attendance: 9,472

Game reference

Nick Rose
Goalies
Anthony Cosmo

	0–1	01:08 – Kelusky (Giles, Buchanan)
	0–2	05:03 – Self (Culp)
	0–3	06:59 – Wiles (Kelusky)
	0–4	13:31 – Steenhuis (Tavares, Llord)
Doyle (Manning, Billings) – 26:37	1–4
	1–5	22:05 – Tavares (Self)
Sanderson (Billings, Doyle) (PP) – 27:44	2–5
	2–6	25:27 – Tavares (Vyse, Culp)
Billings (Sanderson, Manning) – 39:57	3–6
Beirnes (Doyle, Manning) – 42:20	4–6
Beirnes (Leblanc, Billings) – 47:11	5–6
Beirnes (Manning, Billings) – 50:17	6–6
Thenhaus – 58:25	7–6

14 min
Penalties
24 min
55
Shots
42

==== (E2) Rochester Knighthawks vs. (E3) Philadelphia Wings ====
May 4, 2012	Rochester Knighthawks	14–13 (2–3, 2–4, 6–1, 2–7)	Philadelphia Wings	Blue Cross Arena; Attendance: 5,176

Game reference

Matt Vinc
Goalies
Brandon Miller

	0–1	02:13 – Crowley (D. Dawson)
Point (Accursi, Davis) – 10:10	1–1
	1–2	10:40 – Crotty (D. Dawson)
Jamieson (Walters, Powless) – 12:58	2–2
	2–3	13:11 – Merrill (D. Dawson, Reynolds)
	2–4	16:49 – Hominuck (Mundorf)
McCready (Walters) – 18:20	3–4
Burton – 20:18	4–4
Keogh (Accursi) – 23:30	5–4
	5–5	29:31 – Westervelt (Crowley)
Point (Vitarelli, Jamieson) – 29:56	6–5
Powless (Walters, Vitarell) – 32:38	7–5
Accursi (Jamieson) – 36:27	8–5
Jamieson (Davis) – 37:50	9–5
Walters (Keogh, Davis) – 38:22	10–5
Walters (Point) – 40:21	11–5
	11–6	41:20 – Crowley (Manney)
Keogh (Walters, Point) – 43:39	12–6
	12–7	45:35 – Westervelt (Crowley, D. Dawson) (PP)
Point (Davis, Jamieson) – 48:38	13–7
	13–8	49:26 – Crotty (Mundorf)
	13–9	56:37 – Crowley (Hominuck, Mundorf)
Cousins (Jamieson) – 56:56	14–9
	14–10	57:28 – Merrill (Crowley, D. Dawson)
	14–11	58:09 – Merrill (Seibald)
	14–12	58:25 – Crowley (Mundorf, Crotty)
	14–13	59:33 – D. Dawson (Hominuck)

6 min
Penalties
6 min
47
Shots
50

==== (W1) Calgary Roughnecks vs. (W4) Edmonton Rush ====
May 5, 2012	Calgary Roughnecks	11–19 (2–6, 4–3, 4–5, 1–5)	Edmonton Rush	Scotiabank Saddledome; Attendance: 11,161

Game reference

Mike Poulin
Frankie Scigliano
Goalies
Aaron Bold
Brodie MacDonald

Ranger (Evans, Dobbie) (PP) – 01:21	1–0
	1–1	03:53 – Greer (Small, Wilson)
	1–2	05:43 – Small (LaFontaine, Williams)
	1–3	09:02 – Ward (Williams, Wilson)
	1–4	09:54 – Ward (Williams, Small)
Ranger (Shattler, Conway) – 10:35	2–4
	2–5	13:07 – Williams (Greer, Ward) (PP)
	2–6	13:36 – Johnson (Codron, Bold)
Evans (Ranger, Heavenor) (PP) – 16:01	3–6
	3–7	18:05 – Quinlan
Shattler (Snider, Heavenor) – 20:32	4–7
	4–8	22:20 – Wilson (Suddons)
	4–9	25:03 – Johnson (Greer, Ward)
Shattler (Dobbie, Conway) – 26:07	5–9
Evans (McFetridge) – 26:41	6–9
Ranger (Evans, Dobbie) – 30:53	7–9
	7–10	32:17 – Small (Wilson, Ward) (PP)
	7–11	33:30 – Ward
	7–12	35:05 – Johnson (Dilks)
Dobbie (Veltman, Shattler) – 37:10	8–12
	8–13	38:53 – Ward (Toll, Bold)
Ranger (Evans, Dobbie) (PP) – 40:08	9–13
Dobbie (Shattler, Evans) – 43:31	10–13
	10–14	44:02 – LaFontaine (Small, Greer)
	10–15	54:43 – Small (Williams, Ward) (PP)
Dobbie (Conway, Veltman) – 55:37	11–15
	11–16	56:24 – Small
	11–17	57:19 – Ward (Mydske, Bold)
	11–18	57:53 – Small (Wilson, Ward)
	11–19	59:25 – Greer (Wilson, Ward) (PP)

38 min
Penalties
14 min
52
Shots
59

==== (W2) Colorado Mammoth vs. (W3) Minnesota Swarm ====
May 5, 2012	Colorado Mammoth	10–14 (2–5, 3–3, 2–2, 3–4)	Minnesota Swarm	Pepsi Center; Attendance: 14,152

Game reference

Chris Levis
Tye Belanger
Goalies
Evan Kirk

	0–1	02:09 – Tao (Card, Gilbert)
Prout (Grant) (PP) – 03:00	1–1
	1–2	03:21 – Card (Gillam, Crawford)
	1–3	06:46 – Benesch (Card) (PP)
	1–4	10:26 – Morgan (Kirk)
	1–5	11:42 – Ross (Benesch)
Gajic (Reid, Hawksbee) – 12:13	2–5
	2–6	17:01 – Benesch (Tao, Ross)
Jones (Prout, Lincoln) – 18:28	3–6
Grant (Reid, MacLeod) – 18:51	4–6
	4–7	23:29 – Watt (SH)
Jones (Prout, Grant) (PP) – 24:54	5–7
	5–8	29:15 – Benesch (Crawford) (PP)
	5–9	31:53 – Hass (SH)
Grant (Stewart, Coates) – 34:25	6–9
Grant (Gajic, Holding) – 35:00	7–9
	7–10	Ross (MacIntosh, Crawford)
Grant (Sullivan) – 45:51	8–10
Grant (Orsen) – 48:36	9–10
	9–11	52:44 – MacIntosh (Benesch) (PP)
	9–12	56:37 – Card (Benesch, Crawford) (PP)
	9–13	57:11 – Crawford (Benesch, Gillam)
Jones (Pollock, Prout) – 58:56	10–13
	10–14	59:08 – Watt

16 min
Penalties
17 min
47
Shots
49

=== Division Finals ===
==== (E1) Toronto Rock vs. (E2) Rochester Knighthawks ====
May 12, 2012	Toronto Rock	13–17 (2–3, 3–4, 2–4, 6–6)	Rochester Knighthawks	Air Canada Centre; Attendance: 9,384

Game reference

Nick Rose
Pat Campbell
Goalies
Matt Vinc

	0–1	01:04 – Jamieson (McCready, Kirk)
	0–2	09:32 – Accursi (Powless, Point)
Sanderson (Billings, Thenhaus) – 10:04	1–2
Thenhaus (Billings) – 14:21	2–2
	2–3	14:59 – Point (Powless, Jamieson)
Beirnes – 16:17	3–3
	3–4	19:58 – Walters (Vitarelli)
Doyle (Billings, Manning) – 20:24	4–4
	4–5	21:51 – Walters (Keogh, Davis)
	4–6	22:43 – Evans (Kirk)
Gamble (Hoar)	5–6
	5–7	29:24 – Vitarelli (Davis)
	5–8	31:34 – Keogh (Powless, Evans)
	5–9	33:02 – Accursi
	5–10	34:36 – Jamieson (Point)
Sanderson – 35:04	6–10
	6–11	36:06 – Davis (Walters, Powless)
Billings (Leblanc) – 36:41	7–11
	7–12	45:49 – Vitarelli
	7–13	46:24 – Powless (Self)
	7–14	47:17 – Powless (Walters, Davis)
Doyle (Thenhaus) – 50:35	8–14
Sanderson (Leblanc, Billings) – 51:06	9–14
	9–15	Vitarelli (Accursi) (PP)
	9–16	53:57 – Kirk (Campbell) (ENG)
	9–17	55:06 – Vitarelli (PP)
Sanderson (Doyle, Billings) – 55:36	10–17
Beirnes (Leblanc, Sanderson) – 55:51	11–17
Leblanc (Billings, Doyle) – 58:32	12–17
Doyle – 59:15	13–17

11 min
Penalties
9 min
64
Shots
40

==== (W3) Minnesota Swarm vs. (W4) Edmonton Rush ====
May 12, 2012	Minnesota Swarm	3–15 (1–6, 0–5, 1–2, 1–2)	Edmonton Rush	Xcel Energy Center; Attendance: 6,491

Game reference

Evan Kirk
Tyler Carlson
Goalies
Aaron Bold

	0–1	00:42 – Wilson (Small, Williams) (PP)
Tao (Hass) – 02:53	1–1
	1–2	04:48 – Small (Williams, Dilks)
	1–3	08:45 – Wilson (Mydske)
	1–4	08:53 – Dilks
	1–5	09:20 – Greer (Bold)
	1–6	12:23 – Williams (Greer, LaFontaine)
	1–7	16:37 – Small (Ward, Wilson)
	1–8	22:18 – Ward (Corbeil)
	1–9	28:59 – Wilson (Ward, Suddons)
	1–10	29:34 – Ward (Williams, Wilson)
	1–11	29:59 – Greer (Williams, Ward)
	1–12	31:19 – Ward (Wilson, Small)
Tao (Benesch, Ross) (PP) – 40:03	2–12
	2–13	44:59 – Suddons (ENG)
Benesch (Crawford, MacIntosh) (PP) – 46:50	3–13
	3–14	47:51 – Small (Wilson, LaFontaine)
	3–15	53:05 – Ward (Greer, Williams) (PP)

42 min
Penalties
19 min
42
Shots
48

=== NLL Finals ===
==== (E2) Rochester Knighthawks vs. (W4) Edmonton Rush ====
May 19, 2012	Rochester Knighthawks	9–6 (0–1, 1–4, 6–0, 2–1)	Edmonton Rush	Blue Cross Arena; Attendance: 9,277

Game reference

Matt Vinc
Goalies
Aaron Bold

	0–1	01:32 – Greer (Ward, Williams)
	0–2	17:44 – Greer (Williams, LaFontaine)
	0–3	19:44 – Corbeil
Jamieson (Davis, Keogh) – 22:13	1–3
	1–4	24:13 – Wilson (Ward, Greer) (PP)
	1–5	27:38 – Toll
Accursi (Davis, Jamieson) – 34:52	2–5
Powless (Walters, Laverty) –– 37:59	3–5
Jamieson (Accursi, Point) – 39:34	4–5
Jamieson (Point) – 40:50	5–5
Accursi (Jamieson, Keogh) (PP) – 43:43	6–5
Keogh (Powless, Jamieson) – 44:41	7–5
Powless (Jamieson, Walters) – 47:09	8–5
	8–6	54:00 – Ward (Small, Greer)
Jamieson (Walters) – 59:28	9–6

6 min
Penalties
2 min
35
Shots
52

== Milestones and events ==
=== Pre-season ===
- September 1, 2011: The Boston Blazers announced that they would not be participating in the 2012 season.
- September 23, 2011: The NLL announced that there would be several rule changes for the 2012 season. The major changes were:
  - For major penalties, the team will be short-handed for five minutes or if the opposing team scores three (rather than two) goals.
  - When a team gains possession of the ball in their own end, they now have eight seconds (rather than ten) to get the ball over centre.
  - When the whistle is blown to indicate a loss of possession, the player with the ball must immediately put it on the floor. Throwing it or rolling it away is now a penalty.
  - Goaltender pads will be one inch narrower.
- October 26, 2011: The playoff format has changed for the 2012 season. Eight teams will still make the playoffs, four from each division, and the single-game elimination format is retained. However, if the fifth-place team in the West Division has a better record than the fourth-place team in the East, the West division team will take its place. This "crossover" rule is already in use in Major League Soccer and the Canadian Football League.
- November 29, 2011: The NLL announced several more rule changes for the 2012 season:
  - Challenges to on-field calls will be limited to one per team per half
  - The maximum length of a stick is reduced from 46 to 42 inches.
- The Philadelphia Wings announced that during the February 12 game against the Buffalo Bandits, the Wings players will wear special jerseys with their Twitter user names instead of their last names. The game-worn jerseys will be auctioned off after the game, with the proceeds going to the American Cancer Society.

=== Regular season ===
- January 21, 2012: John Grant, Jr. became the fifth player in NLL history to score 1000 points with an assist on a Derek Hopcroft goal in Colorado's 13–12 overtime win over the Calgary Roughnecks. Grant started the season with 30 points in three games.
- January 26, 2012: Toronto Rock captain Colin Doyle suffered a lower body injury early in the Rock's 13–11 defeat of the Knighthawks. The injury kept him out of the lineup during the Rock's game against the Calgary Roughnecks the next night, ending his consecutive game streak at 188 games. Doyle is now tied with Steve Toll for the NLL record.
- February 13, 2012: The Edmonton Rush traded holdout Athan Iannucci and a second-round draft pick to the Washington Stealth in exchange for Paul Rabil and a first-round pick. Iannucci was acquired from the Philadelphia Wings in the off-season for Brodie Merrill, but never signed with the Rush.
- February 15, 2012: Five members of the Rochester Knighthawks were suspended indefinitely by the league after a "brawl" at a restaurant in Bloomington, Minnesota. Cody Jamieson, Tyler Burton, Sid Smith, Travis Hill, and Jordan Hall were arrested, charged with various misdemeanors, and released. The suspensions were lifted a week later.
- February 17, 2012: Former NLL Goaltender of the Year Anthony Cosmo was traded from the Minnesota Swarm to the Buffalo Bandits for first-round draft picks in both 2013 and 2014. Cosmo was selected by the Swarm in the Boston Blazers dispersal draft but had not played with the Swarm.
- February 22, 2012: The Minnesota Swarm named Associate General Manager Joe Sullivan head coach, replacing Mike Lines. No reason was given for the move.
- March 2, 2012: John Grant, who reached the 1,000-point milestone earlier in the year, scored his 500th career goal in a 16–13 win over the Buffalo Bandits. Grant became only the third player in NLL history to reach 500 goals, the other two being Gary Gait and John Tavares.
- March 10, 2012: Shawn Williams became the sixth player in NLL history, and second this season, to reach the 1,000-point plateau as his Edmonton Rush lost 16–9 to the Calgary Roughnecks. Williams joins NLL legends Gary Gait, John Tavares, Colin Doyle, Josh Sanderson, and Williams' former Knighthawk teammate John Grant, Jr., who reached the milestone in January.
- March 17, 2012: John Tavares scored the game-winning goal in a 13–10 win against the Minnesota Swarm. The goal was Tavares' 1,600th point in his 21-year NLL career.
- April 7, 2012: Dan Dawson recorded his 75th and 76th assists of the year, breaking the single-season assists record of 74 previously held by Dawson and Josh Sanderson.
- April 23, 2012: Garrett Billings recorded his 79th assist, surpassing Dan Dawson for the league lead and setting a new mark for assists in a season.
- April 28, 2012: John Grant set a new single-season scoring record, recording his 116th point with a goal in Colorado's 16–14 loss to the Minnesota Swarm. Grant surpassed the record of 115 points, set by John Tavares in 2001.
- April 28, 2012: Garrett Billings finished the season with 82 assists, setting the new single-season assist record.

== Media Coverage ==
Beginning with the 2012 NLL season, U.S. broadcast rights shifted to CBS Sports Network, which carried eight regular season games, all of them live.

A new weekly one-hour radio show called "Toronto Rock Total Access" about the Toronto Rock began on January 2, 2012, on TSN Radio. Rock Communications and Public Relations Coordinator Mike Hancock hosts the show, which airs at 8pm on Monday nights. The Rock also announced that 11 of their games would be televised on TSN or TSN2.

The Edmonton Rush and Calgary Roughnecks announced on January 19, 2012, that their four "Battle of Alberta" games would be televised on Sportsnet.

== All-Star game ==
The 2012 All-Star Game was held at the First Niagara Center in Buffalo on February 25, 2012. The West came back from a 9–2 deficit in the second quarter to win the game 20–18. The Calgary Roughneck's Geoff Snider was named Game MVP, scoring 4 goals and 2 assists, and winning 22 of 26 faceoffs.

=== All-Star teams ===
Eastern Division starters	Western Division starters
John Tavares, Buffalo	John Grant, Jr., Colorado
Cody Jamieson, Rochester	Adam Jones, Colorado
Brodie Merrill, Philadelphia	Andrew Suitor, Minnesota
Billy Dee Smith, Buffalo	Rory Smith, Colorado
Pat McCready, Rochester *	Kyle Rubisch, Edmonton
Mike Thompson, Buffalo (goalie)	Chris Levis, Colorado (goalie)
Eastern Division reserves	Western Division reserves
Luke Wiles, Buffalo	Gavin Prout, Colorado
Dan Dawson, Philadelphia	Rhys Duch, Washington *
Garrett Billings, Toronto	Ryan Benesch, Minnesota
Kevin Crowley, Philadelphia	Callum Crawford, Minnesota
Josh Sanderson, Toronto	Shawn Williams, Edmonton
Colin Doyle, Toronto *	Jeff Shattler, Calgary
Johnny Powless, Rochester	Geoff Snider, Calgary
Max Seibald, Philadelphia	Curtis Manning, Calgary
Chris White, Buffalo	Paul Rabil, Washington **
Sandy Chapman, Toronto	Jordan MacIntosh, Minnesota
Mike Kirk, Rochester	Chris Corbeil, Edmonton *
Matt Roik, Toronto (goalie)	Aaron Bold, Edmonton (goalie)
Scott Self, Buffalo (replacing Doyle)	Lewis Ratcliff, Washington (replacing Duch)
Mike Accursi (replacing McCready)	Matt Beers (replacing Corbeil)

* - Not playing due to injury
** - Not playing due to holdout status

== Awards ==
=== Annual ===
Award	Winner	Team
Most Valuable Player	John Grant, Jr.	Colorado Mammoth
Goaltender of the Year	Mike Poulin	Calgary Roughnecks
Defensive Player of the Year	Kyle Rubisch	Edmonton Rush
Transition Player of the Year	Andrew Suitor	Minnesota Swarm
Rookie of the Year	Adam Jones	Colorado Mammoth
Sportsmanship Award	Johnny Powless	Rochester Knighthawks
GM of the Year	John Arlotta	Minnesota Swarm
Les Bartley Award	Joe Sullivan	Minnesota Swarm
Executive of the Year Award	Andy Arlotta	Minnesota Swarm
Tom Borrelli Award	Jake Elliott	Minnesota Swarm

=== All-Pro teams ===
First Team

- John Grant, Jr., Colorado
- Garrett Billings, Toronto
- Dan Dawson, Philadelphia
- Andrew Suitor, Minnesota
- Kyle Rubisch, Edmonton
- Mike Poulin, Calgary

Second Team

- John Tavares, Buffalo
- Cody Jamieson, Rochester
- Shawn Evans, Calgary
- Brodie Merrill, Philadelphia
- Jeff Gilbert, Minnesota
- Mike Carnegie, Calgary
- Aaron Bold, Edmonton

=== All-Rookie team ===
- Adam Jones, Colorado
- Kevin Crowley, Philadelphia
- Jordan MacIntosh, Minnesota
- Evan Kirk, Minnesota
- Johnny Powless, Rochester
- Stephen Keogh, Rochester

=== Weekly awards ===
The NLL gives out awards weekly for the best offensive player, best transition player, best defensive player, and best rookie. The "Best Overall Player" award is no longer being given out.

Month	Week	Offensive	Defensive	Transition	Rookie
January	1	Dane Dobbie	Curtis Manning	Geoff Snider	Jesse Gamble
January	2	John Grant, Jr.	Mike Thompson	Jordan Hall	Kevin Crowley
January	3	John Grant, Jr.	Brandon Miller	Brodie Merrill	Adam Jones
January	4	Josh Sanderson	Aaron Bold	Andrew Suitor	Jordan MacIntosh
February	5	Rhys Duch	Matt Roik	Paul Rabil	Johnny Powless
February	6	Dan Dawson	Tyler Carlson	Brodie Merrill	Evan Kirk
February	7	Dan Dawson	Pat McCready	Geoff Snider	Kevin Crowley
February	8	Kasey Beirnes	Kyle Rubisch	Geoff Snider	Evan Kirk
March	9	John Grant, Jr.	Kevin Croswell	Andrew Suitor	Derek Hopcroft
March	10	Shawn Evans	Tyler Richards	Peter McFetridge	Adam Jones
March	11	John Tavares	Scott Self	Mark Steenhuis	Kevin Crowley
March	12	John Grant, Jr.	Nick Rose	Brodie Merrill	Adam Jones
March	13	Garrett Billings	Evan Kirk	Geoff Snider	Jamie Lincoln
April	14	Shawn Evans	Anthony Cosmo	Tyler Hass	Johnny Powless
April	15	Stephan Leblanc	Kyle Rubisch	Jordan MacIntosh	Johnny Powless
April	16	Rhys Duch	Frankie Scigliano	Mark Steenhuis	Jay Card
April	17	Lewis Ratcliff	Matt Vinc	Jordan MacIntosh	Stephen Keogh

=== Monthly awards ===
Awards are also given out monthly for the best overall player and best rookie.

Month	Overall	Rookie
January	John Grant, Jr.	Adam Jones
February	John Grant, Jr.	Evan Kirk
March	Garrett Billings; John Grant, Jr.	Adam Jones
April	Garrett Billings	Jordan MacIntosh

== Attendance ==
=== Regular season ===
Home team	Home games	Average attendance	Total attendance
Buffalo Bandits	8	15,918	127,345
Colorado Mammoth	8	15,239	121,913
Toronto Rock	8	11,173	89,384
Minnesota Swarm	8	8,595	68,764
Calgary Roughnecks	8	8,312	66,500
Philadelphia Wings	8	8,212	65,698
Edmonton Rush	8	7,039	56,314
Rochester Knighthawks	8	6,832	54,661
Washington Stealth	8	3,902	31,220
League	72	9,469	681,799

=== Playoffs ===
Home team	Home games	Average attendance	Total attendance
Colorado Mammoth	1	14,152	14,152
Calgary Roughnecks	1	11,161	11,161
Toronto Rock	2	9,428	18,856
Rochester Knighthawks	2	7,226	14,453
Minnesota Swarm	1	6,491	6,491
League	7	9,301	65,113

== See also ==
- 2012 in sports
