= 2011 Edmonton Rush season =

2011 Edmonton Rush
- League: NLL
- Division: 5th West
- 2011 record: 5-11
- Home record: 4-4
- Road record: 1-7
- Goals for: 175
- Goals against: 204
- General Manager: Derek Keenan
- Coach: Derek Keenan
- Captain: Brodie Merrill
- Alternate captains: Jimmy Quinlan; Ryan Ward
- Arena: Rexall Place
- Average attendance: 7,151

Team leaders
- Goals: Scott Evans (27)
- Assists: Corey Small (40)
- Points: Corey Small (63)
- Penalties in minutes: Scott Evans (54)
- Loose Balls: Brodie Merrill (187)
- Wins: Matt Disher (5)
- Goals against average: Matt Disher (12.30)

The Edmonton Rush are a lacrosse team based in Edmonton playing in the National Lacrosse League (NLL). The 2011 season was the 6th in franchise history. The Rush finished 5-11, tied with the Colorado Mammoth, but ended up in 5th place due to tiebreakers and finished out of the playoffs for the fifth time in their six seasons.

== Regular season ==
=== Conference standings ===
East Division
P	Team	GP	W	L	PCT	GB	Home	Road	GF	GA	Diff	GF/GP	GA/GP
1	Buffalo Bandits – xy	16	10	6	.625	0.0	4–4	6–2	169	159	+10	10.56	9.94
2	Toronto Rock – x	16	10	6	.625	0.0	7–1	3–5	187	168	+19	11.69	10.50
3	Rochester Knighthawks – x	16	10	6	.625	0.0	4–4	6–2	176	159	+17	11.00	9.94
4	Boston Blazers – x	16	8	8	.500	2.0	4–4	4–4	166	155	+11	10.38	9.69
5	Philadelphia Wings	16	5	11	.312	5.0	2–6	3–5	143	179	−36	8.94	11.19

West Division
P	Team	GP	W	L	PCT	GB	Home	Road	GF	GA	Diff	GF/GP	GA/GP
1	Calgary Roughnecks – xyz	16	11	5	.688	0.0	6–2	5–3	198	181	+17	12.38	11.31
2	Minnesota Swarm – x	16	8	8	.500	3.0	5–3	3–5	187	180	+7	11.69	11.25
3	Washington Stealth – x	16	8	8	.500	3.0	3–5	5–3	203	198	+5	12.69	12.38
4	Colorado Mammoth – x	16	5	11	.312	6.0	3–5	2–6	151	172	−21	9.44	10.75
5	Edmonton Rush	16	5	11	.312	6.0	4–4	1–7	175	204	−29	10.94	12.75

x: Clinched playoff berth; c: Clinched playoff berth by crossing over to another division; y: Clinched division; z: Clinched best regular season record; GP: Games Played
W: Wins; L: Losses; GB: Games back; PCT: Win percentage; Home: Record at Home; Road: Record on the Road; GF: Goals scored; GA: Goals allowed
Differential: Difference between goals scored and allowed; GF/GP: Average number of goals scored per game; GA/GP: Average number of goals allowed per game

=== Game log ===
Game	Date	Opponent	Location	Score	OT	Attendance	Record
1	January 8, 2011	@ Toronto Rock	Air Canada Centre	L 7–13		11,564	0–1
2	January 15, 2011	@ Boston Blazers	TD Garden	L 7–10		8,536	0–2
3	January 22, 2011	@ Minnesota Swarm	Xcel Energy Center	L 8–9		7,042	0–3
4	January 28, 2011	Calgary Roughnecks	Rexall Place	L 11–15		8,115	0–4
5	January 29, 2011	@ Calgary Roughnecks	Scotiabank Saddledome	L 11–12	OT	10,353	0–5
6	February 11, 2011	Washington Stealth	Rexall Place	W 14–12		6,100	1–5
7	February 12, 2011	@ Washington Stealth	Comcast Arena at Everett	W 15–14		4,088	2–5
8	February 20, 2011	Calgary Roughnecks	Rexall Place	L 11–12		6,998	2–6
9	February 26, 2011	@ Rochester Knighthawks	Blue Cross Arena	L 9–13		5,371	2–7
10	March 5, 2011	Washington Stealth	Rexall Place	L 10–18		7,370	2–8
11	March 19, 2011	@ Calgary Roughnecks	Scotiabank Saddledome	L 14–19		11,019	2–9
12	March 25, 2011	Minnesota Swarm	Rexall Place	W 14–13		7,035	3–9
13	April 1, 2011	Colorado Mammoth	Rexall Place	W 14–10		7,092	4–9
14	April 2, 2011	@ Colorado Mammoth	Pepsi Center	L 6–7		15,027	4–10
15	April 9, 2011	Colorado Mammoth	Rexall Place	L 6–13		7,164	4–11
16	April 16, 2011	Toronto Rock	Rexall Place	W 18–14		7,340	5–11

== Transactions ==
=== Trades ===
September 24, 2010	To Edmonton Rush Devan Wray (T)	To Calgary Roughnecks 6th round pick in 2011 Entry Draft - Darren Kinnear (F)
January 27, 2011	To Edmonton Rush Scott Evans (F)	To Rochester Knighthawks Rory Glaves (D)
February 16, 2011	To Edmonton Rush Tyler Codron (D)	To Washington Stealth Ian Hawksbee (D)
March 2, 2011	To Edmonton Rush Zack Greer (F)	To Minnesota Swarm *1st round pick in 2013 Entry Draft - Robert Church (F)
March 15, 2011	To Edmonton Rush Mike McLellan (F); **1st round pick in 2011 Entry Draft - Evan Kirk (G)	To Colorado Mammoth Gavin Prout (F)

*Later traded back to the Edmonton Rush
**Later traded to the Minnesota Swarm

=== Entry Draft ===
The 2010 NLL Entry Draft took place on September 8, 2010. The Rush selected the following players:

Round	Overall	Player	College/Club
3	28	John LaFontaine (D)	Whitby, Ontario
3	29	Alex Kedoh Hill (F)	Six Nations, Ontario
4	38	Cameron Holding (T)	Florida Southern College
5	48	Jarrett Toll (D)	New Westminster, British Columbia
6	58	Eric Lewthwaite (D)	New Westminster, British Columbia

== Roster ==
2011 Edmonton Rush roster
Active (21-man) roster		Inactive roster	Coaches
Goaltenders: 31 (Canada) Rob Blasdell; 1 (Canada) Matt Disher; Defensemen: 77 (Canada) Tyler Codron; 19 (Canada) Bill Greer; 33 (Canada) John LaFontaine; 6 (Canada) John Lintz; 30 (Canada) David Morgan; 2 (Canada) Brett Mydske; 7 (Canada) Derek Suddons; 3 (United States) Jarrett Toll	Forwards: 91 (Canada) Scott Evans; 88 (Canada) Zack Greer; 73 (Iroquois) Dean Hill; 66 (Iroquois) Kedoh Hill; 18 (Canada) Mike McLellan; 21 (Iroquois) Andy Secore; 15 (Canada) Corey Small; 20 (Canada) Dane Stevens; 44 (Canada) Ryan Ward (A); Transition: 17 (Canada) Brodie Merrill (C); 81 (Canada) Jimmy Quinlan (A); 8 (Canada) Scott Stewart; 22 (Canada) Kyle Sweeney	Practice squad: 35 (Canada) Mitch Anders; 12 (Canada) Pat Jones; 11 (Canada) Ryan McNish; Injured reserve: 96 (Canada) Bob McBride; Restricted list: 26 (Canada) Andrew Turner; -- (Canada) Ben Prepchuk	Head coach {{{Head Coach}}} Legend: * Suspended list; (C) Captain; (A) Alternate captain; Roster updated 2011-02-16; NLL Transactions

== See also ==
- 2011 NLL season
