= 2012 Calgary Roughnecks season =

2012 Calgary Roughnecks
- League: NLL
- Division: 1st West
- 2012 record: 12-4
- Home record: 5-3
- Road record: 7-1
- Goals for: 216
- Goals against: 170
- General Manager: Mike Board
- Coach: Dave Pym
- Captain: Andrew McBride
- Arena: Scotiabank Saddledome

Team leaders
- Goals: Shawn Evans (32)
- Assists: Shawn Evans (47)
- Points: Shawn Evans (79)
- Penalties in minutes: Shawn Evans (65)
- Loose Balls: Geoff Snider (232)
- Wins: Mike Poulin (10)
- Goals against average: Mike Poulin (10.27)

The Calgary Roughnecks are a lacrosse team based in Calgary playing in the National Lacrosse League (NLL). The 2012 season was the 11th in franchise history.

== Regular season ==
=== Conference standings ===
East Division
P	Team	GP	W	L	PCT	GB	Home	Road	GF	GA	Diff	GF/GP	GA/GP
1	Toronto Rock – xy	16	9	7	.562	0.0	3–5	6–2	198	196	+2	12.38	12.25
2	Rochester Knighthawks – x	16	7	9	.438	2.0	5–3	2–6	191	197	−6	11.94	12.31
3	Philadelphia Wings – x	16	7	9	.438	2.0	3–5	4–4	176	207	−31	11.00	12.94
4	Buffalo Bandits – x	16	7	9	.438	2.0	4–4	3–5	198	204	−6	12.38	12.75

West Division
P	Team	GP	W	L	PCT	GB	Home	Road	GF	GA	Diff	GF/GP	GA/GP
1	Calgary Roughnecks – xyz	16	12	4	.750	0.0	5–3	7–1	216	170	+46	13.50	10.62
2	Colorado Mammoth – x	16	11	5	.688	1.0	5–3	6–2	217	201	+16	13.56	12.56
3	Minnesota Swarm – x	16	9	7	.562	3.0	6–2	3–5	202	190	+12	12.62	11.88
4	Edmonton Rush – x	16	6	10	.375	6.0	4–4	2–6	167	175	−8	10.44	10.94
5	Washington Stealth	16	4	12	.250	8.0	2–6	2–6	179	204	−25	11.19	12.75

x: Clinched playoff berth; c: Clinched playoff berth by crossing over to another division; y: Clinched division; z: Clinched best regular season record; GP: Games Played
W: Wins; L: Losses; GB: Games back; PCT: Win percentage; Home: Record at Home; Road: Record on the Road; GF: Goals scored; GA: Goals allowed
Differential: Difference between goals scored and allowed; GF/GP: Average number of goals scored per game; GA/GP: Average number of goals allowed per game

=== Game log ===
Game	Date	Opponent	Location	Score	OT	Attendance	Record
1	January 8, 2012	@ Toronto Rock	Air Canada Centre	W 12–9		10,341	1–0
2	January 14, 2012	@ Washington Stealth	Comcast Arena at Everett	W 13–10		4,687	2–0
3	January 21, 2012	Colorado Mammoth	Scotiabank Saddledome	L 12–13	OT	9,341	2–1
4	January 28, 2012	Toronto Rock	Scotiabank Saddledome	L 13–14	OT	7,460	2–2
5	February 10, 2012	@ Washington Stealth	Comcast Arena at Everett	W 12–11		3,509	3–2
6	February 18, 2012	Edmonton Rush	Scotiabank Saddledome	W 12–8		8,049	4–2
7	February 24, 2012	@ Colorado Mammoth	Pepsi Center	W 21–10		15,134	5–2
8	March 3, 2012	Minnesota Swarm	Scotiabank Saddledome	L 11–15		7,638	5–3
9	March 9, 2012	@ Edmonton Rush	Rexall Place	W 13–10		7,438	6–3
10	March 10, 2012	Edmonton Rush	Scotiabank Saddledome	W 16–9		8,316	7–3
11	March 24, 2012	Buffalo Bandits	Scotiabank Saddledome	W 17–6		7,687	8–3
12	March 30, 2012	@ Minnesota Swarm	Xcel Energy Center	W 15–10		8,510	9–3
13	March 31, 2012	Washington Stealth	Scotiabank Saddledome	W 13–11		8,203	10–3
14	April 6, 2012	Rochester Knighthawks	Scotiabank Saddledome	W 15–14		9,806	11–3
15	April 14, 2012	@ Rochester Knighthawks	Blue Cross Arena	L 12–14		5,964	11–4
16	April 21, 2012	@ Edmonton Rush	Rexall Place	W 9–6		7,737	12–4

== Playoffs ==
=== Game logs ===
Game	Date	Opponent	Location	Score	OT	Attendance	Record
Division Semifinal	May 5, 2012	Edmonton Rush	Scotiabank Saddledome	L 11–19		11,161	0–1

== Transactions ==
=== Trades ===
September 21, 2011	To Calgary Roughnecks 1st round pick, 2011 entry draft (Johnny Powless)	To Rochester Knighthawks Shawn Evans
March 19, 2012	To Calgary Roughnecks 1st round pick in 2014 Entry Draft	To Toronto Rock Nick Rose; Conditional 2nd round pick in 2014 Entry Draft

=== Dispersal Draft ===
The Roughnecks chose the following players in the Boston Blazers dispersal draft:

Round	Overall	Player
1	7	Nick Rose
2	16	Geoff McNulty
3	25	Brock Armour
4	32	Kevin Leveille

=== Entry draft ===
The 2011 NLL Entry Draft took place on September 21, 2011. The Roughnecks selected the following players:

Round	Overall	Player	College/Club
1	7	Travis Cornwall	Coquitlam, BC
2	11	Greg Harnett	Orangeville, ON
2	18	Frankie Scigliano	New Westminster, BC
5	42	Barclay Hickey	Okotoks, AB
6	46	Darren Kinnear	Edmonton, AB

== Roster ==
2012 Calgary Roughnecks roster
Active (21-man) roster		Inactive roster	Coaches
Goaltenders: 30 (Canada) Mike Poulin; 92 (Canada) Frankie Scigliano; Defensemen: 16 (Canada) Mike Carnegie (A); 24 (Canada) Scott Carnegie; 50 (Canada) Greg Harnett; 33 (Canada) Jon Harnett; 55 (Canada) Mike Kilby; 3 (Canada) Dan MacRae; 37 (Canada) Andrew McBride (C); 11 (Canada) Ryan McNish	Forwards: 91 (Canada) Cory Conway; 17 (Canada) Curtis Dickson; 44 (Canada) Dane Dobbie; 15 (Canada) Shawn Evans; 71 (Canada) Scott Ranger; 77 (Canada) Jeff Shattler; 9 (Canada) Kaleb Toth (A); 36 (Canada) Daryl Veltman; Transition: 20 (Canada) Travis Cornwall; 40 (Canada) Nolan Heavenor; 10 (Canada) Curtis Manning; 80 (Canada) Peter McFetridge; 4 (Canada) Geoff Snider	Practice squad: -- (Canada) Matt Leveque; 17 (Canada) Geoff McNulty; Injured reserve: 61 (Canada) Dayne Michaud	Head coach {{{Head Coach}}} Legend: * Suspended list; (C) Captain; (A) Alternate captain; Roster updated 2012-01-09; NLL Transactions

== See also ==
- 2012 NLL season
