= NLL on CBS =

- Genre: NLL lacrosse telecasts
- Presented by: Brian Shannahan; Mia Gordon; Ashley Docking; Tyson Geick; Tanner Fetch; Pat Gregoire; John Fraser; Casey Guerin; Craig Rybczynski; Jake Elliot
- Countries of origin: United States; Canada
- Original language: English
- No. of seasons: 2 (2017–2018 version); 2 (2011–2012 version)

Production
- Production locations: Various NLL venues
- Cinematography: George Graffeo; Harold Hoffman; Bob Jamieson; Sig Meyers
- Camera setup: Multi-camera
- Running time: 180 minutes or until game ended
- Production company: CBS Sports

Original release
- Network: CBS
- Release: September 10, 2011–May 24, 2018

Related
- CBS Sports Spectacular

The NLL on CBS is the branding used for broadcasts of National Lacrosse League (NLL) games produced by CBS Sports, the sports division of the CBS television network in the United States, for four separate seasons from 2011 to 2012 and 2017 to 2018.

== History ==
=== 2011 launch ===
In 2011, CBS outbid Fox for the rights to the package of National Lacrosse League games it for the entire 2011 season including playoffs. CBS entered the bidding to regain the National Lacrosse League rights beginning in the 2011, only to again be outbid by Fox, which agreed to pay an undisclosed amount for the three-year broadcast contract.

In 2012, the NLL shifted the package to a new model to increase its prominence. The entire package would be produced by a separate rightsholder, who would hold rights to simulcast a portion of the package on their respective network. CBS was the first rightsholder under this model, airing season games on broadcast television, and producing the remainder of the package to air exclusively on NLL TV to satisfy its carriage agreements.

In 2017, CBS Sports president Sean McManus said regarding the prospects of the NLL returning to CBS in the foreseeable future. "It's a great addition to our entire CBS Sports line up which includes golf and college basketball." NLL Commissioner Nick Sakiewicz reiterated the CBS executive's words by adding “We are thrilled to continue to build upon our historic broadcasting partnerships with the addition of CBS Sports. The future of sports is an ever-changing viewing experience, and bringing in a world class organization and platform like CBS Sports Digital is truly exciting for our fans."

=== 2017-2018 revival ===
Additionally, for the 2017 and 2018 seasons, CBS Sports promoted NLL games across its digital platforms, which exposed a larger audience to the League. CBS already has a long-running deal with the Patriot Lacrosse League but never an expansion into professional lacrosse until this deal.

Preceded by None	NLL network broadcast partner in the United States; 2017 - 2018	Succeeded by BR Live
