= Curtis Manning (lacrosse) =

Canadian lacrosse player (born 1987)

Personal information
- Nationality: Canadian
- Born: December 3, 1987 (age 38) New Westminster, British Columbia, Canada
- Height: 6 ft 4 in (193 cm)
- Weight: 205 lb (93 kg; 14 st 9 lb)

Sport
- Position: Transition
- Shoots: Right
- NLL draft: 6th overall, 2008; Calgary Roughnecks
- NLL team: Calgary Roughnecks
- Pro career: 2010–

Curtis Manning (born December 3, 1987) is a Canadian professional lacrosse player who plays for the Calgary Roughnecks in the National Lacrosse League, wearing #10. Since turning professional in 2010, he has played for the Roughnecks for his entire NLL career. Manning has represented Team Canada in field lacrosse, helping them win silver at the 2010 World Lacrosse Championship.

== Career ==
Manning played for New Westminster Salmonbellies Jr. A of the BC Junior A Lacrosse League. With them in 2008, he was named the Inside Lacrosse Indoor Junior Defender of the Year and First Team All Canadian.

Manning was drafted in the first round (sixth overall), in the 2008 NLL Entry Draft. He returned to play for Simon Fraser University for his senior year after being drafted. While playing for the Simon Fraser Clan in the Pacific Northwest Collegiate Lacrosse League (PNCLL), he was named Division 1 MCLA 1st team All-American in 2008 and 2nd team All-American in 2009 as well as the PNCLL MVP in 2009 and 2010. After finishing his degree in Kinesiology from SFU, he went on to study medicine at the University of British Columbia.

In his rookie season with the Calgary Roughnecks, he was named to the NLL 2010 All-Rookie Team. He then played for the Canada men's national lacrosse team at the 2010 World Lacrosse Championship in Manchester, United Kingdom, winning a silver medal with Team Canada. He missed most of the 2011 NLL season in order to concentrate on his medical school studies. Late in the season, he returned to play two regular season and two playoff games after Roughnecks head coach Dave Pym asked him to return because of an injury to Andrew McBride.

During the summers, Manning has played for the New Westminster Salmonbellies in the Western Lacrosse Association. In 2010, he was named to the WLA First Team All-star Team. In 2011, in addition to being named to the WLA First Team All-Star Team he was also awarded the Gord Nicholson Award for best WLA defender.

== Personal ==
Born in New Westminster, British Columbia, Manning is now a resident family doctor, and his father used to play lacrosse for the New Westminster Salmonbellies. His sister Alyssa is also an athlete, having played volleyball for the Douglas College Royals.

== Statistics ==
=== NLL ===
Curtis Manning		Regular season									Playoffs								
Season	Team	GP	G	A	Pts	LB	PIM	Pts/GP	LB/GP	PIM/GP	GP	G	A	Pts	LB	PIM	Pts/GP	LB/GP	PIM/GP
2010	Calgary Roughnecks	16	4	4	8	72	36	0.50	4.50	2.25	1	0	1	1	5	0	1.00	5.00	0.00
2011	Calgary Roughnecks	2	2	0	2	6	4	1.00	3.00	2.00	2	0	0	0	9	0	0.00	4.50	0.00
2012	Calgary Roughnecks	14	5	9	14	84	18	1.00	6.00	1.29	1	0	0	0	8	0	0.00	8.00	0.00
2013	Calgary Roughnecks	11	0	3	3	52	16	0.27	4.73	1.45	1	0	0	0	4	0	0.00	4.00	0.00
2014	Calgary Roughnecks	13	4	7	11	69	10	0.85	5.31	0.77	7	0	1	1	24	4	0.14	3.43	0.57
2015	Calgary Roughnecks	17	2	4	6	74	14	0.35	4.35	0.82	4	1	0	1	14	4	0.25	3.50	1.00
2016	Calgary Roughnecks	13	2	6	8	59	25	0.62	4.54	1.92	3	0	1	1	11	2	0.33	3.67	0.67
2017	Calgary Roughnecks	18	1	6	7	79	12	0.39	4.39	0.67	–	–	–	–	–	–	–	–	–
2018	Calgary Roughnecks	18	1	6	7	76	20	0.39	4.22	1.11	2	0	0	0	11	0	0.00	5.50	0.00
2019	Calgary Roughnecks	7	0	2	2	27	8	0.29	3.86	1.14	4	0	0	0	14	0	0.00	3.50	0.00
2020	Calgary Roughnecks	9	0	4	4	37	10	0.44	4.11	1.11	–	–	–	–	–	–	–	–	–
2022	Calgary Roughnecks	12	1	1	2	44	10	0.17	3.67	0.83	–	–	–	–	–	–	–	–	–
2023	Calgary Roughnecks	18	3	4	7	47	14	0.39	2.61	0.78	4	0	1	1	15	2	0.25	3.75	0.50
		168	25	56	81	726	197	0.48	4.32	1.17	29	1	4	5	115	12	0.17	3.97	0.41
Career Total:		197	26	60	86	841	209	0.44	4.27	1.06									

GP–Games played; G–Goals; A–Assists; Pts–Points; LB–Loose balls; PIM–Penalty minutes; Pts/GP–Points per games played; LB/GP–Loose balls per games played; PIM/GP–Penalty minutes per games played.
