= 2012 Toronto Rock season =

2012 Toronto Rock
- League: NLL
- Division: 1st East
- 2012 record: 9–7
- Home record: 3–5
- Road record: 6–2
- Goals for: 198
- Goals against: 196
- General Manager: Terry Sanderson
- Coach: Troy Cordingley
- Captain: Colin Doyle
- Alternate captains: Sandy Chapman; Blaine Manning; Phil Sanderson; Cam Woods
- Arena: Air Canada Centre
- Average attendance: 11,173

Team leaders
- Goals: Garrett Billings (32)
- Assists: Garrett Billings (82)
- Points: Garrett Billings (114)
- Penalties in minutes: Patrick Merrill (48)
- Loose Balls: Sandy Chapman (83)
- Wins: Nick Rose (5)
- Goals against average: Nick Rose (10.69)

The Toronto Rock are a lacrosse team based in Toronto playing in the National Lacrosse League (NLL). The 2012 season was the 15th in franchise history, and 14th as the Rock.

After the retirement of Bob Watson, the Rock needed to fill the starting goaltender spot for the first time in franchise history. In July, the Rock traded defender Kyle Ross to the Washington Stealth for Matt Roik, a 10-year NLL veteran. The Rock lost their first two games of the season, but then won four of their next five. Roik was named Defensive Player of the Week in week 5 and was also named to the Eastern All-Star team. But the team lost their next three games, including a 21–14 blowout to the Buffalo Bandits, and management felt a change needed to be made. They sent a draft pick to the Calgary Roughnecks for backup goaltender Nick Rose and released Roik.

The Rock won five of their final six regular season games, finishing the season with a 9–7 record, good enough for first in the Eastern division. In the division semi-finals, they once again faced the Bandits, who had beaten the Rock in 2 of their 3 matchups in the regular season. With stellar goaltending performances by both Rose and former Rock goalie Anthony Cosmo, the Rock defeated the Bandits 7–6 to advance to their third straight Eastern final.

The Rock hosted the Rochester Knighthawks, who had a 4–18 all-time record in Toronto and hadn't beaten the Rock in Toronto since 2008. But the Knighthawks scored early and often, and despite being down by only two at the half, the Rock were never able to regain the lead and Rochester advanced to the Championship game by beating the Rock 17–13.

== Regular season ==
=== Conference standings ===
East Division
| P | Team | GP | W | L | PCT | GB | Home | Road | GF | GA | Diff | GF/GP | GA/GP |
|---|---|---|---|---|---|---|---|---|---|---|---|---|---|
| 1 | Toronto Rock – xy | 16 | 9 | 7 | .562 | 0.0 | 3–5 | 6–2 | 198 | 196 | +2 | 12.38 | 12.25 |
| 2 | Rochester Knighthawks – x | 16 | 7 | 9 | .438 | 2.0 | 5–3 | 2–6 | 191 | 197 | −6 | 11.94 | 12.31 |
| 3 | Philadelphia Wings – x | 16 | 7 | 9 | .438 | 2.0 | 3–5 | 4–4 | 176 | 207 | −31 | 11.00 | 12.94 |
| 4 | Buffalo Bandits – x | 16 | 7 | 9 | .438 | 2.0 | 4–4 | 3–5 | 198 | 204 | −6 | 12.38 | 12.75 |

West Division
| P | Team | GP | W | L | PCT | GB | Home | Road | GF | GA | Diff | GF/GP | GA/GP |
|---|---|---|---|---|---|---|---|---|---|---|---|---|---|
| 1 | Calgary Roughnecks – xyz | 16 | 12 | 4 | .750 | 0.0 | 5–3 | 7–1 | 216 | 170 | +46 | 13.50 | 10.62 |
| 2 | Colorado Mammoth – x | 16 | 11 | 5 | .688 | 1.0 | 5–3 | 6–2 | 217 | 201 | +16 | 13.56 | 12.56 |
| 3 | Minnesota Swarm – x | 16 | 9 | 7 | .562 | 3.0 | 6–2 | 3–5 | 202 | 190 | +12 | 12.62 | 11.88 |
| 4 | Edmonton Rush – x | 16 | 6 | 10 | .375 | 6.0 | 4–4 | 2–6 | 167 | 175 | −8 | 10.44 | 10.94 |
| 5 | Washington Stealth | 16 | 4 | 12 | .250 | 8.0 | 2–6 | 2–6 | 179 | 204 | −25 | 11.19 | 12.75 |

x: Clinched playoff berth; c: Clinched playoff berth by crossing over to another division; y: Clinched division; z: Clinched best regular season record; GP: Games Played
W: Wins; L: Losses; GB: Games back; PCT: Win percentage; Home: Record at Home; Road: Record on the Road; GF: Goals scored; GA: Goals allowed
Differential: Difference between goals scored and allowed; GF/GP: Average number of goals scored per game; GA/GP: Average number of goals allowed per game

=== Game log ===
| Game | Date | Opponent | Location | Score | OT | Attendance | Record |
|---|---|---|---|---|---|---|---|
| 1 | January 8, 2012 | Calgary Roughnecks | Air Canada Centre | L 9–12 | | 10,341 | 0–1 |
| 2 | January 14, 2012 | @ Buffalo Bandits | First Niagara Center | L 10–14 | | 16,356 | 0–2 |
| 3 | January 27, 2012 | Rochester Knighthawks | Air Canada Centre | W 13–11 | | 11,862 | 1–2 |
| 4 | January 28, 2012 | @ Calgary Roughnecks | Scotiabank Saddledome | W 14–13 | OT | 7,460 | 2–2 |
| 5 | February 4, 2012 | @ Philadelphia Wings | Wells Fargo Center | W 15–6 | | 7,807 | 3–2 |
| 6 | February 18, 2012 | Philadelphia Wings | Air Canada Centre | L 8–14 | | 10,360 | 3–3 |
| 7 | February 24, 2012 | Rochester Knighthawks | Air Canada Centre | W 16–12 | | 10,274 | 4–3 |
| 8 | March 3, 2012 | Washington Stealth | Air Canada Centre | L 9–14 | | 10,530 | 4–4 |
| 9 | March 9, 2012 | Philadelphia Wings | Air Canada Centre | L 10–12 | | 9,804 | 4–5 |
| 10 | March 16, 2012 | Buffalo Bandits | Air Canada Centre | L 14–21 | | 12,153 | 4–6 |
| 11 | March 24, 2012 | @ Rochester Knighthawks | Blue Cross Arena | W 13–7 | | 5,714 | 5–6 |
| 12 | March 31, 2012 | @ Buffalo Bandits | First Niagara Center | W 15–9 | | 17,322 | 6–6 |
| 13 | April 7, 2012 | Edmonton Rush | Air Canada Centre | W 12–8 | | 14,060 | 7–6 |
| 14 | April 14, 2012 | @ Colorado Mammoth | Pepsi Center | L 12–19 | | 15,215 | 7–7 |
| 15 | April 20, 2012 | @ Washington Stealth | Comcast Arena | W 16–13 | | 3,846 | 8–7 |
| 16 | April 28, 2012 | @ Edmonton Rush | Rexall Place | W 12–11 | | 6,478 | 9–7 |

== Playoffs ==
=== Game log ===
| Game | Date | Opponent | Location | Score | OT | Attendance | Record |
|---|---|---|---|---|---|---|---|
| Division Semifinal | May 5, 2012 | Buffalo Bandits | Air Canada Centre | W 7–6 | | 9,472 | 1–0 |
| Division Final | May 12, 2012 | Rochester Knighthawks | Air Canada Centre | L 13–17 | | 9,384 | 1–1 |

== Transactions ==
=== Trades ===
| July 13, 2011 | To Toronto Rock Dan Carey; 3rd round pick, 2011 entry draft 1st round pick, 2013 entry draft | To Colorado Mammoth Mat MacLeod; Creighton Reid; 1st round pick, 2011 entry draft 2nd round pick, 2011 entry draft |
| July 25, 2011 | To Toronto Rock Matt Roik | To Washington Stealth Kyle Ross |
| September 9, 2011 | To Toronto Rock Josh Sanderson; Nick Inch | To Minnesota Swarm Jeff Gilbert; 9th pick, Boston Blazers dispersal draft 12th pick, 2011 entry draft Conditional 1st round pick, 2012 entry draft |
| November 4, 2011 | To Toronto Rock Bill Greer | To Edmonton Rush 2nd round pick in 2012 Entry Draft; 2nd round pick in 2012 Entry Draft |
| March 19, 2012 | To Toronto Rock Nick Rose; Conditional 2nd round pick in 2014 Entry Draft | To Calgary Roughnecks 1st round pick in 2014 Entry Draft |

=== Dispersal Draft ===
The Rock chose the following player in the Boston Blazers dispersal draft:

| Round | Overall | Player |
|---|---|---|
| 2 | 18 | Jon Durno |

=== Entry draft ===
The 2011 NLL Entry Draft took place on September 21, 2011. The Rock selected the following players:

| Round | Overall | Player | College/Club |
|---|---|---|---|
| 2 | 17 | Jesse Gamble | Cornell University |
| 3 | 26 | Pete Rennie | Peterborough, ON |
| 4 | 35 | Eric Bissell | Peterborough, ON |
| 5 | 44 | Kyle Davis | Brampton, ON |
| 6 | 50 | Phil Rawn | Kitchener, ON |
| 6 | 53 | Mark Burnett | Mars Hill College |

== Roster ==
2012 Toronto Rock roster
| Active (21-man) roster | | Inactive roster | Coaches |
|---|---|---|---|
| Goaltenders: 37 (Canada) Pat Campbell; 66 (Canada) Nick Rose; Defensemen: 27 (Canada) Glen Bryan; 5 (Canada) Sandy Chapman (A); 20 (Canada) Bruce Codd; 45 (Canada) Damon Edwards; 21 (Canada) Bill Greer; 44 (Canada) Stephen Hoar; 11 (Canada) Mike Hobbins; 88 (Canada) Scott Johnston; 14 (Canada) Rob Marshall; 9 (Canada) Patrick Merrill; 18 (Canada) Phil Sanderson (A); 22 (Canada) Cam Woods (A) | Forwards: 33 (Canada) Kasey Beirnes; 13 (Canada) Garrett Billings; 6 (Canada) Dan Carey; 7 (Canada) Colin Doyle (C); 17 (Canada) Stephan Leblanc; 16 (Canada) Blaine Manning (A); 19 (Canada) Josh Sanderson; 24 (Canada) Brenden Thenhaus; Transition: 4 (Canada) Jesse Gamble | Practice squad: 35 (Canada) Zak Boychuk; 12 (Canada) Adam McGourty; 23 (Canada) Peter Rennie; Injured reserve: 10 (Canada) Rob Hellyer; 56 (Canada) Drew Petkoff; 26 (Canada) Ryan Sharp; Holdout: 34 (Canada) Nick Inch; 93 (Canada) Aaron Pascas; Unable to play: 90 (Canada) Jamie Rooney | Head coach {{{Head Coach}}} Legend: * Suspended list; (C) Captain; (A) Alternate captain; Roster updated 2012-03-19; NLL Transactions |

== See also ==
- 2012 NLL season
