= 2011 Calgary Roughnecks season =

2011 Calgary Roughnecks
- League: NLL
- Division: 1st West
- 2011 record: 11-5
- Home record: 6-2
- Road record: 5-3
- Goals for: 198
- Goals against: 181
- General Manager: Brad Banister
- Coach: Dave Pym
- Captain: Andrew McBride
- Arena: Scotiabank Saddledome

Team leaders
- Goals: Dane Dobbie (34)
- Assists: Jeff Shattler (46)
- Points: Dane Dobbie (75); Jeff Shattler (75)
- Penalties in minutes: Geoff Snider (74)
- Loose Balls: Geoff Snider (171)
- Wins: Mike Poulin (11)
- Goals against average: Mike Poulin (11.03)

The Calgary Roughnecks are a lacrosse team based in Calgary playing in the National Lacrosse League (NLL). The 2011 season was the 10th in franchise history.

Despite a fairly successful 10-6 2010 season, the Roughnecks made a number of major roster changes before the 2011 season. In August 2010, the Roughnecks traded superstar forward Josh Sanderson and a draft pick to the Boston Blazers for Darryl Veltman, Jon Harnett, Kyle Ross, and a draft pick. They also traded defender Jeff Moleski to the Washington Stealth. In October, longtime captain Tracey Kelusky was traded to the Buffalo Bandits for a first-round draft pick.

Because of these changes, the Roughnecks were picked by some experts to finish out of the playoffs. But after a 5-3 start to the season, the Roughnecks won six straight, including wins over the defending champion Stealth as well as the Toronto Rock, who were first in the east at the time. The Roughnecks finished the season with the best record in the league at 11-5.

== Regular season ==
=== Conference standings ===
East Division
P	Team	GP	W	L	PCT	GB	Home	Road	GF	GA	Diff	GF/GP	GA/GP
1	Buffalo Bandits – xy	16	10	6	.625	0.0	4–4	6–2	169	159	+10	10.56	9.94
2	Toronto Rock – x	16	10	6	.625	0.0	7–1	3–5	187	168	+19	11.69	10.50
3	Rochester Knighthawks – x	16	10	6	.625	0.0	4–4	6–2	176	159	+17	11.00	9.94
4	Boston Blazers – x	16	8	8	.500	2.0	4–4	4–4	166	155	+11	10.38	9.69
5	Philadelphia Wings	16	5	11	.312	5.0	2–6	3–5	143	179	−36	8.94	11.19

West Division
P	Team	GP	W	L	PCT	GB	Home	Road	GF	GA	Diff	GF/GP	GA/GP
1	Calgary Roughnecks – xyz	16	11	5	.688	0.0	6–2	5–3	198	181	+17	12.38	11.31
2	Minnesota Swarm – x	16	8	8	.500	3.0	5–3	3–5	187	180	+7	11.69	11.25
3	Washington Stealth – x	16	8	8	.500	3.0	3–5	5–3	203	198	+5	12.69	12.38
4	Colorado Mammoth – x	16	5	11	.312	6.0	3–5	2–6	151	172	−21	9.44	10.75
5	Edmonton Rush	16	5	11	.312	6.0	4–4	1–7	175	204	−29	10.94	12.75

x: Clinched playoff berth; c: Clinched playoff berth by crossing over to another division; y: Clinched division; z: Clinched best regular season record; GP: Games Played
W: Wins; L: Losses; GB: Games back; PCT: Win percentage; Home: Record at Home; Road: Record on the Road; GF: Goals scored; GA: Goals allowed
Differential: Difference between goals scored and allowed; GF/GP: Average number of goals scored per game; GA/GP: Average number of goals allowed per game

=== Game log ===
Game	Date	Opponent	Location	Score	OT	Attendance	Record
1	January 8, 2011	Buffalo Bandits	Scotiabank Saddledome	W 10–9		9,590	1–0
2	January 9, 2011	@ Washington Stealth	Comcast Arena at Everett	W 13–11		5,364	2–0
3	January 15, 2011	Colorado Mammoth	Scotiabank Saddledome	L 7–8		9,346	2–1
4	January 22, 2011	Washington Stealth	Scotiabank Saddledome	L 14–19		9,362	2–2
5	January 28, 2011	@ Edmonton Rush	Rexall Place	W 15–11		8,115	3–2
6	January 29, 2011	Edmonton Rush	Scotiabank Saddledome	W 12–11	OT	10,353	4–2
7	February 12, 2011	@ Toronto Rock	Air Canada Centre	L 8–9	OT	10,364	4–3
8	February 20, 2011	@ Edmonton Rush	Rexall Place	W 12–11		6,998	5–3
9	March 5, 2011	@ Philadelphia Wings	Wells Fargo Center	W 13–7		9,604	6–3
10	March 13, 2011	@ Washington Stealth	Comcast Arena at Everett	W 17–13		3,441	7–3
11	March 19, 2011	Edmonton Rush	Scotiabank Saddledome	W 19–14		11,019	8–3
12	March 25, 2011	Toronto Rock	Scotiabank Saddledome	W 14–9		10,705	9–3
13	April 1, 2011	Minnesota Swarm	Scotiabank Saddledome	W 15–12		10,486	10–3
14	April 2, 2011	@ Minnesota Swarm	Xcel Energy Center	L 8–13		6,504	10–4
15	April 8, 2011	Colorado Mammoth	Scotiabank Saddledome	W 14–13		12,213	11–4
16	April 15, 2011	@ Colorado Mammoth	Pepsi Center	L 7–11		17,841	11–5

== Playoffs ==
=== Game log ===
Game	Date	Opponent	Location	Score	OT	Attendance	Record
Division Semifinal	April 30, 2011	Colorado Mammoth	Scotiabank Saddledome	W 10–6		10,092	1–0
Division Final	May 7, 2011	Washington Stealth	Scotiabank Saddledome	L 8–10		10,125	1–1

== Roster ==
2011 Calgary Roughnecks roster
Active (21-man) roster		Inactive roster	Coaches
Goaltenders: 00 (Canada) Curtis Palidwor; 30 (Canada) Mike Poulin; Defensemen: 16 (Canada) Mike Carnegie (A); 24 (Canada) Scott Carnegie; 20 (Canada) Bruce Codd; 33 (Canada) Jon Harnett; 55 (Canada) Mike Kilby; 3 (Canada) Dan MacRae; 37 (Canada) Andrew McBride (C); 61 (Canada) Dayne Michaud	Forwards: 91 (Canada) Cory Conway; 17 (Canada) Curtis Dickson; 44 (Canada) Dane Dobbie; 41 (Canada) Derek Hopcroft; 6 (Canada) Brandon Ivey; 71 (Canada) Scott Ranger; 11 (Canada) Mark Scherman; 9 (Canada) Kaleb Toth (A); 36 (Canada) Daryl Veltman; Transition: 4 (Canada) Devan Wray; 80 (Canada) Peter McFetridge; 77 (Canada) Jeff Shattler; 22 (Canada) Geoff Snider	Practice squad: 34 (Canada) Alex Coutts-G; 27 (Canada) Jordan Sealock-T; 21 (Canada) Joe Vetere-F	Head coach {{{Head Coach}}} Legend: * Suspended list; (C) Captain; (A) Alternate captain; Roster updated NLL Transactions

== See also ==
- 2011 NLL season
