= Major League Lacrosse on television =

Major League Lacrosse (MLL) was a men's field lacrosse league consisting of six active teams in the United States. The league's inaugural season was in 2001. Teams played 16 regular-season games from late May to late September, with a four-team playoff for the championship trophy, the Steinfeld Trophy.

== Fox Sports Net (2001–2003) ==
For Major League Lacrosse's first two seasons of existence, their games were broadcast on Fox Sports Net. The package called for 12 regular season telecasts on Sunday afternoons beginning in the second week of June and running through MLL Championship Game on Labor Day Weekend.

Fox Sports Net employed Mike Crispino, Quint Kessenich, and Brian Kilmeade as commentators.

== ESPN2 (2003–2012) ==
ESPN2 televised a weekly MLL game on Tuesday afternoons from 2003 through 2011. In 2012, ESPN2 televised three regular season games, the All-Star Game, one semifinal, and the MLL Championship game. MLL games have not been regularly shown on ESPN2 since 2012 due to low ratings. Games continue to be streamed on ESPN3.

ESPN2 used Joe Beninati and Quint Kessenich as their commentary team. Other announcers that ESPN3 employed were play-by-play announcers Todd Bell, Jason Chandler, Mike Evans, Scott Garceau, Eamon McAnaney, Dave Ryan and Tom Werme, along with analysts Paul Carcaterra, Brian Shanahan, Evan Washburn and Ron Zwerin.

== CBS Sports Network (2013–2017) and Lax Sports Network (2018) ==
CBS Sports Network has televised all-star games and the playoffs since 2013. MLL did not receive any money from these networks for these deals.

CBS Sports Network was scheduled to nationally televise 14 games in 2012. Dave Ryan and Evan Washburn were employed as commentators. CBS Sports Network also produced about 18 episodes a year of Inside The MLL, which was a 30-minute show hosted by Evan Washburn that covered the previous week's games and the current league news.

The first game that CBS Sports Network televised was a game at from Sports Authority Field at Mile High between the Rochester Rattlers and the Denver Outlaws on Saturday, May 18, 2013. The game aired on a one hour same-day delay at 10:00 p.m. ET. CBS Sports Network was also scheduled to televise the Semi-Final Game later that August.

In 2017, Lax Sports Network was given exclusive rights to all 63 regular season games. Eric Frede and Brendan McDaniels were employed by LAX Sports Network as commentators. Twitter streamed the semifinal games and CBS Sports Network broadcast the final.

== Stadium, ESPN+, and ESPN2 (2019–2020) ==
On April 1, 2019, the league announced they had reacquired broadcast rights from Lax Sports Network. It was unclear where each team would broadcast its games, though the Boston Cannons announced on March 28 that NBC Sports Boston would air all 16 of their games.

One day prior to the start of the 2019 season, the league announced that 12 games would be broadcast on Stadium and the network would air a weekly studio show.

The league also announced that they would renew its partnership with ESPN and stream a "Game of the Week" throughout the season on the network's streaming service ESPN+. Furthermore, the 2019 All-Star Game and Championship Game would air on ESPN2. Joe Beninati and Quint Kessenich were again used as the primary broadcast team with Mark Dixon and Don Zimmerman serving as the secondary crew.

Following an abbreviated 2020 season due to the COVID-19 pandemic, MLL announced a merger with the Premier Lacrosse League. With the merger, MLL ceased to exist as a separate entity.

== See also ==
- Sports_broadcasting_contracts_in_the_United_States#Major_League_Lacrosse
- National Lacrosse League on television
- Premier Lacrosse League on television
