= National Lacrosse League on television =

NLL television coverage

The National Lacrosse League (NLL) is a men's professional box lacrosse league with teams in the United States and Canada. Games have been broadcast on television in some capacity since the league's first season in 1987.

== Early years on regional sports networks (1987–1990) ==
In Philadelphia, Eagle Pro Box Lacrosse League games were televised by PRISM. Larry Rosen, Tony Seaman, and Mark Zumoff were the commentators for PRISM. Meanwhile in New England, the 1990 Championship Game between the Philadelphia Wings and New England Blazers was broadcast on NESN with Leif Elsmo and Steve Glover on the call.

== National coverage ==
=== 1990s ===
==== Prime Network (1991–1993) ====
From 1991-1993, the Prime Network was the primary national television broadcasters for the Major Indoor Lacrosse League. Commentators that Prime employed included Craig Johnson and Leif Elsmo as well as Bill Beroza, Bruce Todman, and Jon Horton. For the Buffalo market, 1992 Championship Game between the Buffalo Bandits and Philadelphia Wings was broadcast live on Empire Sports Network.

==== ESPN and ESPN2 (1994–1999) ====
On November 30, 1993, ESPN signed a six-year agreement with the National Lacrosse League. This particular package of 12 games would be telecast on ESPN2, on a delayed basis. The first ever Monday night game on ESPN2 featured the Detroit Turbos and the Baltimore Thunder. Playoff broadcasts, meanwhile, would air on both ESPN and ESPN2.

ESPN's broadcast of the 1994 Championship Game between the Philadelphia Wings the Buffalo Bandits, was the first live telecast by ESPN of a National Lacrosse League game. ESPN employed Leif Elsmo, Kristi Lee, and Quint Kessenich as commentators during this period. On December 1, 1995, it was announced that ESPN would broadcast games on Monday nights beginning at 7:30 p.m. ET beginning in the 1996 season.

On January 9, 1998, the NLL announced deals with regional sports networks such as Comcast SportsNet, Buffalo's Empire Sports Network, and Washington, D.C.'s Home Team Sports.

The CTV SportsNet used Joe Bowen, Brian Shanahan, and Suneel Joshi on commentary for their Canadian coverage of the 1999 Championship Game between the Toronto Rock and Rochester Knighthawks.

=== 2000s ===
==== CNN/SI and Rogers SportsNet (2001–2002) ====
For the 2001-02 and 2002-03 seasons, CNN Sports Illustrated broadcast 17 regular season games beginning on November 24, 2001, the All-Star Game, and five playoff games, including the Championship Game. Just like with ESPN's prior coverage, CNN/SI used Leif Elsmo and Quint Kessenich on commentary.

Meanwhile, on September 20, 2001, the NLL announced that Canada's Rogers Sportsnet (formally CTV SportsNet) would broadcast 26 regular season games, the Playoffs, and the Championship Game during the 2001–2002 season.

==== Fox Sports Net (2004) ====
On December 17, 2003, the league announced a new partnership with Fox Sports Net to broadcast nine regular season games NLL games beginning as well as the All-Star Game. Fox Sports Net employed Mitch Hyder, Brian Shanahan, and Bill Hall as commentators.

Five days after the Fox Sports Net deal was announced, the NLL announced an agreement with New York's YES Network to carry eight regular season games in featuring the Buffalo Bandits and the Rochester Knighthawks for the 2004 season.

==== NBC, ESPN2, and America One Television (2005–2006) ====
The NLL had its All-Star Games and Championship games on NBC in 2005 and ESPN2 in 2006. When NBC aired the NLL, it marked first time that live broadcasts of lacrosse would be nationally aired on American network television. Mike Emrick, Brian Shanahan, and Mark Morgan provided commentary for NBC. The NLL paid NBC approximately paid $250,000 per hour to NBC. The 2005 All-Star Game in itself, garnered an 0.8 rating (or more than 800,000 U.S. households) for NBC. The NLL moved the date of the game from February 27 to February 26 to accommodate NBC's schedule. The Championship Game was also televised in Canada on The Score, and internationally via CNBC International, CNBC Asia, and on Armed Forces Network.

On February 1, 2005, the NLL announced new broadcast partnerships with the America One Television Network, Cox Sports Television and Comcast Regional Networks. One month later, the NLL announced an agreement with Canada's Bell Express Vu, to broadcast out-of-market games on its pay-per-view channels.

==== Versus and ESPN2 (2007–2008) ====
In 2007, Versus regularly scheduled NLL games on Saturday nights. Versus however, cancelled their NLL coverage in 2008 season, due to a dispute between the Professional Lacrosse Players' Association and the NLL owners in completing the collective bargaining agreement. ESPN2 and ESPN360 wound up picking up the broadcasting rights for the 2008 NLL Championship Game.

=== 2010s ===
==== Versus, CBS Sports Network (2010–2012) ====
In 2010, it was announced that Versus would broadcast that season's championship game. For the 2011 season, it was announced that Versus would begin its coverage with the All-Star Game. This was followed by 6 weekly games, and 2 playoff games, one of these being the championship game. Versus would drop the NLL for the league's 2012 season; U.S. broadcast rights were instead picked up by CBS Sports Network, which aired eight regular season games.

==== The Lacrosse Network, Fox Sports Go, Twitter, and SportsLive (2013–2017) ====
In 2012, the NLL reached an agreement with The Lacrosse Network, a partnered YouTube channel, to distribute all of the 2013 season's games onto YouTube. All games were available on YouTube after the broadcast and most games were broadcast live.

During the 2016 season, Fox Sports Go streamed a package of 50 games. Streaming was taken in-house during the playoffs, with the NeuLion-operated NLLTV streaming games from the division semifinals onward. The following season, the NLL reached several streaming deals, with CBS Sports Digital's SportsLive service streaming all games, and Twitter streaming a package of selected games throughout the season under a two-season deal.

==== B/R Live (2018–2020) ====
In 2018, the league announced a multi-season deal with Turner Sports to stream games exclusively on Bleacher Report's over-the-top service B/R Live. During the 2019 season, the NLL reinstated a game of the week package, streaming on both Facebook and Twitter.

For the national broadcasting teams assigned to call the 2019 NLL Finals, New England Black Wolves announcer, Brendan Glasheen would provide play-by-play with Toronto Rock color commentator Brian Shanahan as the analyst for the games hosted by the East Division winner. Meanwhile, Colorado Mammoth announcer Teddy Jenner would provide play-by-play along with Vancouver Warriors color commentator Brad Challoner as the analyst for the games hosted by the West Division winner. Finally, Toronto Rock floor reporter Ashley Docking would serve as the sideline reporter for all games during the NLL Finals.

=== 2020s ===
==== ESPN and TSN (2022–2026) ====
For the 2022 season, the NLL reached a new exclusive media rights agreement with ESPN Inc., under which all games will stream on ESPN+ in the United States, and at least 10 will air on an ESPN television channel. TSN, a Canadian sports channel minority-owned by ESPN, also returned as the domestic broadcaster of the league in Canada, airing a weekly "game of the week" package on Saturday nights, playoff games, and streaming all other games. These games were initially free for TSN subscribers via TV Everywhere authentication or TSN Direct, but began to require a separate TSN+ subscription in the 2024 season.

After previously depending on individual teams to provide game broadcasts for B/R Live, the league adopted a centralized production model for the majority of games. A skeleton crew of commentators, camera operators, and other technical staff are present on-site, while the remainder of the production is based out of one of three hubs in Clifton, Salt Lake City, or Toronto. For games televised by TSN, the network employs its own on-site production; both the Toronto hub and TSN games utilize the resources of Dome Productions, which is 50%-owned by TSN parent company Bell Media.

==== FloSports (2026–present) ====
Beginning in 2026, all games will stream globally on FloSports.

== Local coverage ==
=== Current television stations ===
As of the 2026 NLL season

Team	Station(s)	Notes
Buffalo Bandits	WNLO; WIVB (select games); MSG Western New York (select games)	Most games are broadcast on WNLO, however, at least 2 games were broadcast on WIVB and on MSG during the 2026 season.
Calgary Roughnecks	No current local station	Games are broadcast in Canada on TSN/TSN+
Colorado Mammoth	Altitude Sports and Entertainment	Regional sports network owned by Kroenke Sports & Entertainment
Georgia Swarm	Peachtree Sports Network	Regional sports network owned by Gray Media. Swarm games are broadcast in the Atlanta area on WPCH-TV.
Halifax Thunderbirds	No current local station	Games are broadcast in Canada on TSN/TSN+
Las Vegas Desert Dogs	Silver Sports & Entertainment Network; KVVU (select games)	SSEN is owned & operated by KVVU, and games are found on the station's second subchannel. Select games are broadcast on the main channel. Desert Dogs games are also broadcast on YouTube TV.
Oshawa FireWolves	No current local station	Games are broadcast in Canada on TSN/TSN+
Ottawa Black Bears	No current local station	Games are broadcast in Canada on TSN/TSN+
Philadelphia Wings	WPHL	WPHL became the Wings' exclusive television broadcaster in 2026, after splitting rights with WPSG in some form since 2018.
Rochester Knighthawks	WHAM-DT2 (select games)	Only two games were scheduled to be broadcast on WHAM-DT2 in 2026. All other games are exclusive to ESPN+.
San Diego Seals	Spectrum Cable Channel 4	Seals games are broadcast on cable television only in the San Diego area.
Saskatchewan Rush	No current local station	Games are broadcast in Canada on TSN/TSN+
Toronto Rock	No current local station	Games are broadcast in Canada on TSN/TSN+
Vancouver Warriors	No current local station	Games are broadcast in Canada on TSN/TSN+

== National broadcasters ==
=== United States ===
==== Terrestrial television ====
- NBC: 2005

==== Cable television ====
- America One: 2005–2006
- CBS Sports Network: 2011–2012; 2017–2018
- CNN/SI: 2001–2003
- ESPN: 1994–1999; 2022–2026
- ESPN2: 2006, 2008; 2022–2026
- Prime Network: 1991–1993
- Versus: 2007, 2010–2011

==== Internet television ====
- B/R Live: 2018–2020
- CBS Sports Digital: 2017
- ESPN+: 2022–2026
- Facebook: 2019
- Fox Sports Go: 2016
- FloSports: 2026-present
- Twitter: 2017
- The Lacrosse Network (YouTube): 2012–2013

=== Canada ===
- CTV/Rogers Sportsnet: 1999–2002, 2006
- The Score Television Network: 2003–2008
- TSN: 2010–2011; 2015–2016; 2022–2026
- TSN+: 2022–2026

== See also ==
- National Lacrosse League#Media coverage
- Sports broadcasting contracts in the United States#National Lacrosse League
- Major League Lacrosse on television
- Premier Lacrosse League on television
