= Dave Pym =

New Zealand-Canadian lacrosse coach

Dave Pym is a lacrosse coach, currently serving as the video coach and Western scout for the Buffalo Bandits of the National Lacrosse League. Pym previously served as the head coach of the Calgary Roughnecks. He was hired by the Roughnecks after a successful junior coaching career with the Burnaby Lakers of the BC Junior A Lacrosse League, where his team won multiple Minto Cups. Despite great regular season success, Pym's teams had trouble winning in the playoffs, and as a result, Pym's contract was not renewed after a loss to the Edmonton Rush in the 2012 playoffs.

== NLL Coaching Record ==
Team	Year	Regular Season				Post Season			
Team	Year	Won	Lost	Win %	Finish	Won	Lost	Win %	Result
CGY	2010	10	6	.625	2nd in West Division	0	1	.000	Lost in Division Semifinal
CGY	2011	11	5	.688	1st in West Division	1	1	.500	Lost in Division Final
CGY	2012	12	4	.750	1st in West Division	0	1	.000	Lost in Division Semifinal
CGY Total		33	12	.733		1	3	.250	
Total		33	12	.733		1	3	.250	

Preceded by Troy Cordingley	Head coach of the Calgary Roughnecks; 2010–12	Succeeded by Curt Malawsky
