= Bruce Codd =

Canadian lacrosse player (born 1978)

Personal information
- Born: February 23, 1978 Orangeville, Ontario, Canada
- Height: 5 ft 8 in (173 cm)
- Weight: 160 lb (73 kg; 11 st 6 lb)

Sport
- Position: Defenseman
- Shoots: Left
- NLL draft: 66th overall, 1999; Albany Attack
- NLL team Former teams: Toronto Rock; Albany Attack; Columbus Landsharks; Montreal Express; Ottawa Rebel; Arizona Sting; Calgary Roughnecks
- Pro career: 2000–

Bruce Codd (born February 23, 1978, in Orangeville, Ontario) is a lacrosse player for the Toronto Rock in the National Lacrosse League.

Codd began his NLL career with the Albany Attack in 2000. He played one season in each of Albany, Columbus, Montreal, and Ottawa before settling in Arizona for four seasons. When the Sting ceased operations after the 2007 season, Codd was chosen by Calgary in the dispersal draft. Codd remained in Calgary for four seasons before signing a two-year contract with the Toronto Rock as a free agent before the 2012 season.

== Statistics ==
=== NLL ===
Bruce Codd		Regular season									Playoffs								
Season	Team	GP	G	A	Pts	LB	PIM	Pts/GP	LB/GP	PIM/GP	GP	G	A	Pts	LB	PIM	Pts/GP	LB/GP	PIM/GP
2000	Albany Attack	5	3	3	6	13	2	1.20	2.60	0.40	–	–	–	–	–	–	–	–	–
2001	Columbus Landsharks	13	5	7	12	60	4	0.92	4.62	0.31	–	–	–	–	–	–	–	–	–
2002	Montreal Express	16	9	36	45	197	10	2.81	12.31	0.63	–	–	–	–	–	–	–	–	–
2003	Ottawa Rebel	16	4	11	15	101	6	0.94	6.31	0.38	–	–	–	–	–	–	–	–	–
2004	Arizona Sting	6	1	4	5	32	6	0.83	5.33	1.00	–	–	–	–	–	–	–	–	–
2005	Arizona Sting	16	3	11	14	97	10	0.88	6.06	0.63	3	1	4	5	25	2	1.67	8.33	0.67
2006	Arizona Sting	16	0	9	9	117	11	0.56	7.31	0.69	2	0	1	1	20	0	0.50	10.00	0.00
2007	Arizona Sting	16	3	6	9	97	14	0.56	6.06	0.88	3	0	1	1	18	2	0.33	6.00	0.67
2008	Calgary Roughnecks	16	3	7	10	114	0	0.63	7.13	0.00	2	0	2	2	16	0	1.00	8.00	0.00
2009	Calgary Roughnecks	16	1	4	5	76	6	0.31	4.75	0.38	3	2	4	6	20	0	2.00	6.67	0.00
2010	Calgary Roughnecks	16	0	6	6	76	2	0.38	4.75	0.13	1	0	0	0	6	0	0.00	6.00	0.00
2011	Calgary Roughnecks	15	1	2	3	61	0	0.20	4.07	0.00	2	0	0	0	9	0	0.00	4.50	0.00
2012	Toronto Rock	14	0	3	3	51	0	0.21	3.64	0.00	1	0	0	0	2	0	0.00	2.00	0.00
		181	33	109	142	1,092	71	0.78	6.03	0.39	17	3	12	15	116	4	0.88	6.82	0.24
Career Total:		198	36	121	157	1,208	75	0.79	6.10	0.38									

GP–Games played; G–Goals; A–Assists; Pts–Points; LB–Loose balls; PIM–Penalty minutes; Pts/GP–Points per games played; LB/GP–Loose balls per games played; PIM/GP–Penalty minutes per games played.
