= 2024 Saskatchewan Rush season =

Professional lacrosse season in NLL

2024 Saskatchewan Rush
- League: NLL
- Division: West
- General Manager: Derek Keenan
- Coach: Jimmy Quinlan
- Captain: Ryan Keenan
- Arena: SaskTel Centre
- Average attendance: 8,085

The Saskatchewan Rush are a lacrosse team based in Saskatoon, Saskatchewan, Canada, playing in the National Lacrosse League (NLL). The 2024 season is the 18th in franchise history, 8th in Saskatchewan.

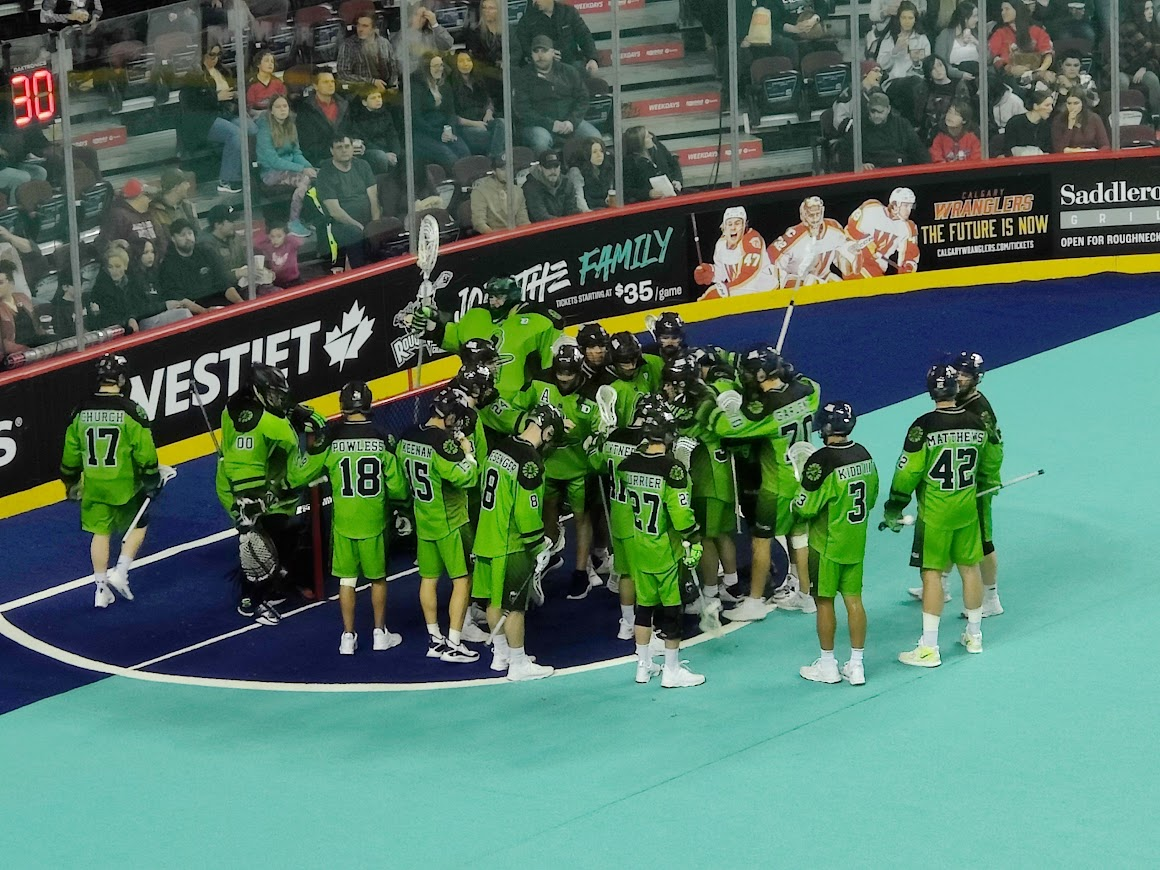
Saskatchewan Rush crowding around the net before a preseason game against the Calgary Roughnecks on November 26, 2022, at the Scotiabank Saddledome.

== Current standings ==
P	Team	GP	W	L	PCT	GB	Home	Road	GF	GA	Diff	GF/GP	GA/GP
1	Toronto Rock – xz	18	15	3	.833	0.0	7–2	8–1	218	169	+49	12.11	9.39
2	San Diego Seals – x	18	13	5	.722	2.0	8–1	5–4	210	178	+32	11.67	9.89
3	Albany FireWolves – x	18	11	7	.611	4.0	5–4	6–3	206	191	+15	11.44	10.61
4	Buffalo Bandits – x	18	11	7	.611	4.0	6–3	5–4	237	212	+25	13.17	11.78
5	Georgia Swarm – x	18	10	8	.556	5.0	6–3	4–5	198	197	+1	11.00	10.94
6	Halifax Thunderbirds – x	18	10	8	.556	5.0	6–3	4–5	228	200	+28	12.67	11.11
7	Panther City Lacrosse Club – x	18	9	9	.500	6.0	5–4	4–5	205	202	+3	11.39	11.22
8	Rochester Knighthawks – x	18	8	10	.444	7.0	4–5	4–5	214	226	−12	11.89	12.56
9	New York Riptide	18	8	10	.444	7.0	4–5	4–5	206	234	−28	11.44	13.00
10	Saskatchewan Rush	18	8	10	.444	7.0	4–5	4–5	217	210	+7	12.06	11.67
11	Calgary Roughnecks	18	8	10	.444	7.0	6–3	2–7	198	194	+4	11.00	10.78
12	Vancouver Warriors	18	8	10	.444	7.0	5–4	3–6	202	211	−9	11.22	11.72
13	Philadelphia Wings	18	6	12	.333	9.0	1–8	5–4	198	233	−35	11.00	12.94
14	Las Vegas Desert Dogs	18	5	13	.278	10.0	2–7	3–6	176	223	−47	9.78	12.39
15	Colorado Mammoth	18	5	13	.278	10.0	4–5	1–8	193	226	−33	10.72	12.56

== Game log ==
=== Regular season ===
Game	Date	Opponent	Location	Score	OT	Attendance	Record
1	December 1, 2023	@ Halifax Thunderbirds	Scotiabank Centre	L 12–17		8,537	0–1
2	December 9, 2023	Rochester Knighthawks	SaskTel Centre	L 14–16		8,708	0–2
3	December 15, 2023	@ Las Vegas Desert Dogs	Michelob Ultra Arena	W 17–5		5,135	1–2
4	December 31, 2023	Albany FireWolves	SaskTel Centre	L 10–11	OT	9,377	1–3
5	January 20, 2024	Vancouver Warriors	SaskTel Centre	L 9–11		8,250	1–4
6	February 3, 2024	Panther City Lacrosse Club	SaskTel Centre	W 10–9		8,133	2–4
7	February 10, 2024	@ Vancouver Warriors	Rogers Arena	W 13–9		9,371	3–4
8	February 24, 2024	Halifax Thunderbirds	SaskTel Centre	L 6–19		7,885	3–5
9	March 2, 2024	@ Colorado Mammoth	Ball Arena	W 15–7		10,449	4–5
10	March 8, 2024	@ Buffalo Bandits	KeyBank Center	L 14–15	OT	16,596	4–6
11	March 16, 2024	New York Riptide	SaskTel Centre	W 17–15		7,010	5–6
12	March 23, 2024	@ New York Riptide	Nassau Veterans Memorial Coliseum	L 11–14		4,875	5–7
13	March 24, 2024	@ Georgia Swarm	Gas South Arena	L 7–9		5,073	5–8
14	March 28, 2024	@ Philadelphia Wings	Wells Fargo Center (Philadelphia)	W 16–12		9,695	6–8
15	April 5, 2024	@ Calgary Roughnecks	Scotiabank Saddledome	L 10–12		10,993	6–9
16	April 6, 2024	Calgary Roughnecks	SaskTel Centre	W 12–9		7,245	7–9
17	April 13, 2024	San Diego Seals	SaskTel Centre	W 13–8		7,090	8–9
18	April 20, 2024	Toronto Rock	SaskTel Centre	L 11–12		9,069	8–10

== Current roster ==
Saskatchewan Rush roster
Active (21-man) roster		Inactive roster	Coaches
Goaltenders: 46 (Canada) Laine Hruska; 92 (Canada) Frankie Scigliano; Defensemen: 3 (Canada) Bobby Kidd III; 6 (Canada) Isaac Ngyou; 8 (Canada) Mike Messenger; 10 (Canada) Mike Mallory; 13 (Canada) Connor McClelland; 43 (Canada) Jake Boudreau; 47 (Canada) Adam Jay; 70 (Canada) Holden Garlent; 77 (Canada) Ryan Barnable; 95 (Canada) Jerrett Smith; 97 (Canada) Keegan Bell	Forwards: 2 (Canada) Zach Manns; 7 (Canada) Patrick Dodds; 9 (Canada) Clark Walter; 15 (Canada) Ryan Keenan; 17 (Canada) Robert Church; 21 (Canada) Nathaniel Kozevnikov; 29 (Canada) Mike Triolo; 96 (Canada) Cameron Wengreniuk		Head coach: Jimmy Quinlan; Assistant coaches: Cam Sedgwick - Offensive Coach; Jeremy Tallevi - Defensive Coach; Legend: * Suspended list; (C) Captain; (A) Alternate captain; Roster updated 2022-11-01; NLL Transactions
