= List of National Lacrosse League venues =

Newest arenas in the NLL

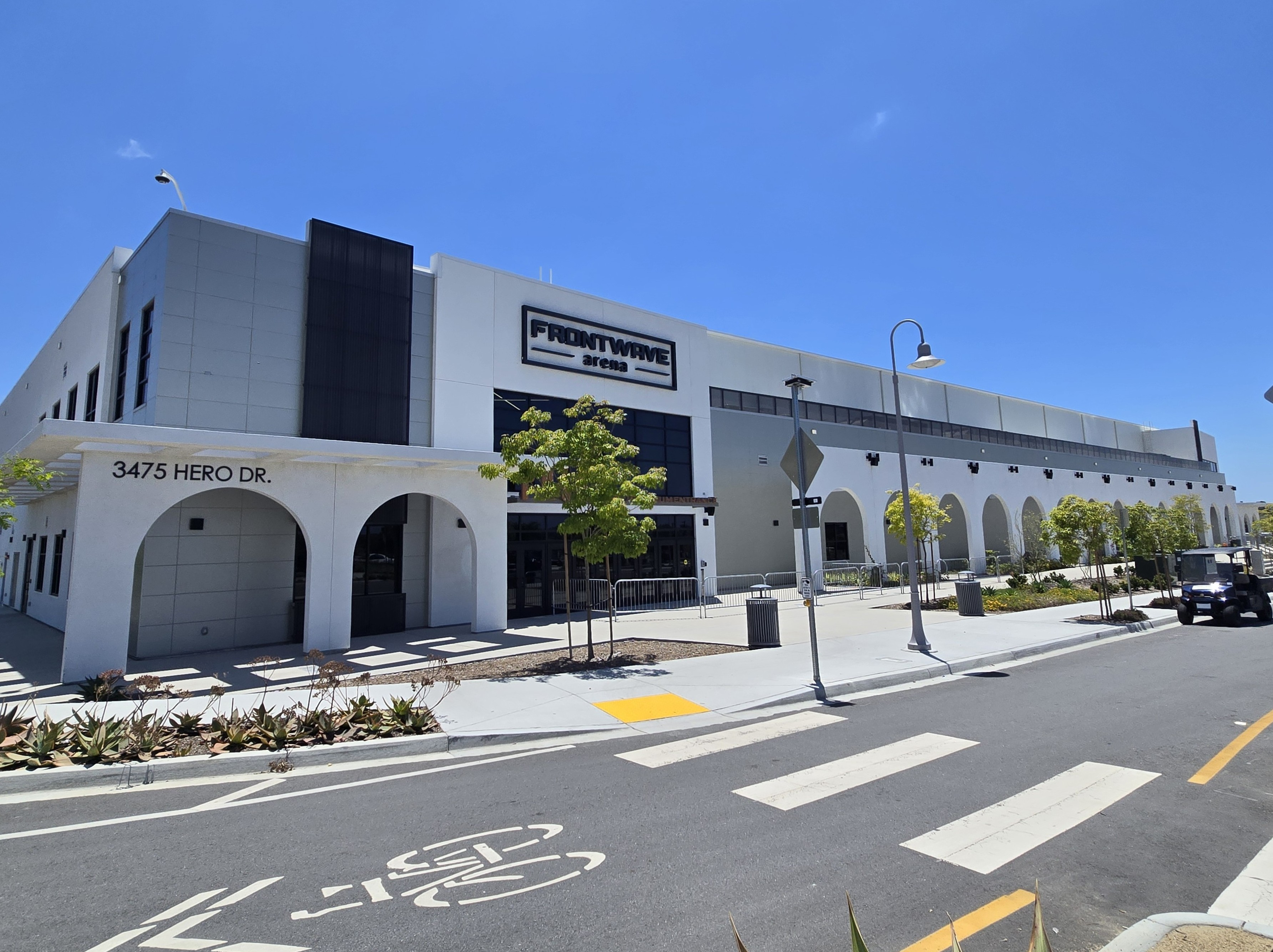
Frontwave Arena, opened in 2024. The building will become the new home of the San Diego Seals in the 2027 season.

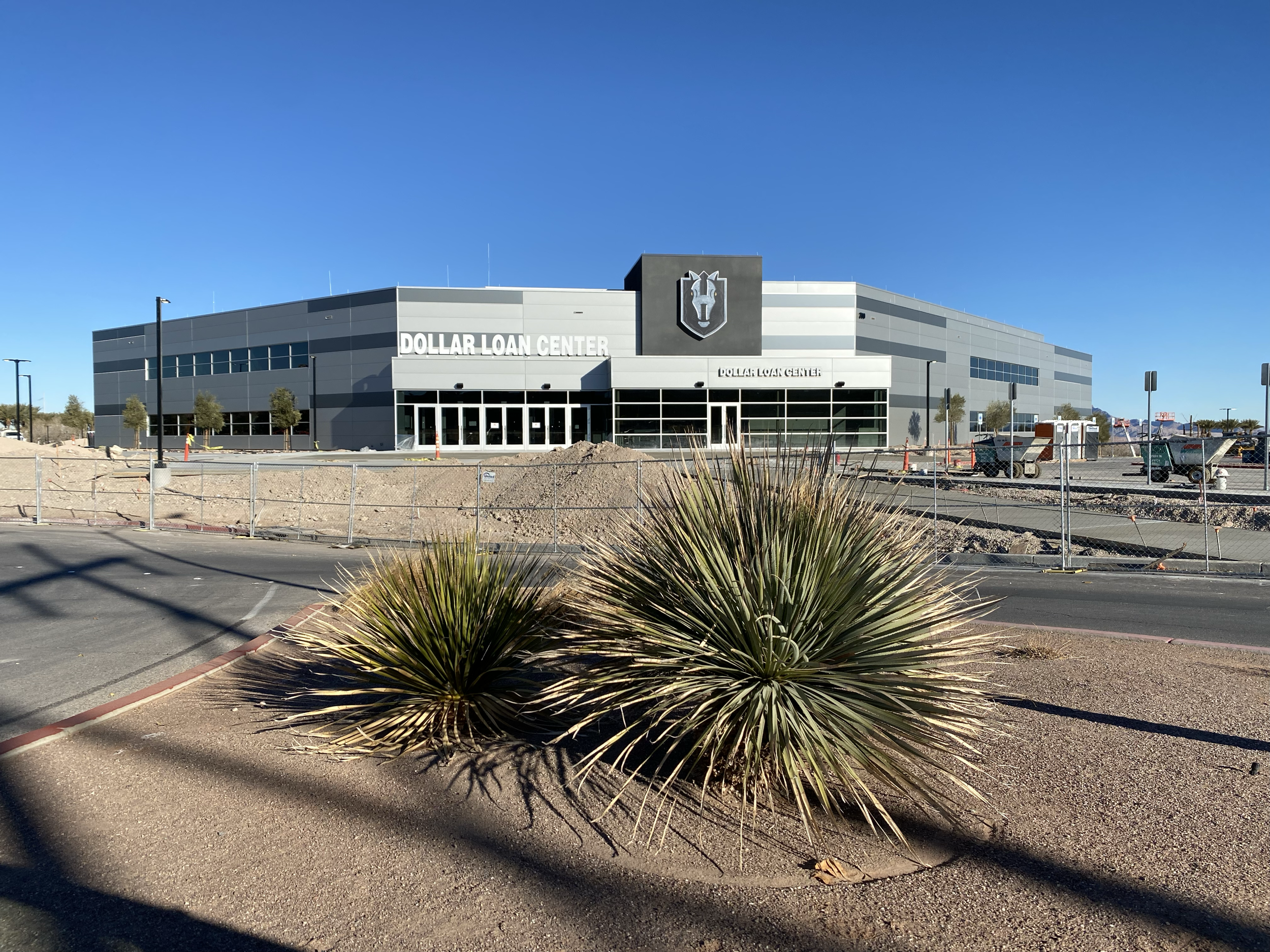
Lee's Family Forum, opened in 2022. It is the home of the Las Vegas Desert Dogs.

This is a list of venues used by the National Lacrosse League, a men's professional indoor lacrosse league in North America. It has teams in Canada and in the United States. This list includes past, present, and future arenas.

== Current arenas ==
Image	Arena	Location	Team	Capacity	Opened	Season of first NLL game	Ref(s)
	Ball Arena	Denver, Colorado	Colorado Mammoth	18,007	1999	2003	
	Blue Cross Arena	Rochester, New York	Rochester Knighthawks	11,200	1955	1995	
	Frontwave Arena	Oceanside, California	San Diego Seals	6,000	2024	2027	
	Gas South Arena	Duluth, Georgia	Georgia Swarm	10,500	2003	2016	
	KeyBank Center	Buffalo, New York	Buffalo Bandits	19,070	1996	1997	
	Lee's Family Forum	Henderson, Nevada	Las Vegas Desert Dogs	5,567	2022	2025	
	Rogers Arena	Vancouver, British Columbia	Vancouver Warriors	18,910	1995	2001	
	SaskTel Centre	Saskatoon, Saskatchewan	Saskatchewan Rush	15,195	1988	2016	
	Scotiabank Centre	Halifax, Nova Scotia	Halifax Thunderbirds	10,500	1978	2019	
	Scotiabank Saddledome	Calgary, Alberta	Calgary Roughnecks	19,289	1983	2001	
	TD Coliseum	Hamilton, Ontario	Toronto Rock	17,383	1985	1998	
	Tribute Communities Centre	Oshawa, Ontario	Oshawa FireWolves	6,125	2006	2026	

== Future and proposed arenas ==
Arena	Team	Location	Capacity	Opening	Reference
Scotia Place	Calgary Roughnecks	Calgary, Alberta	18,400	2027	

== Former arenas ==
Former National Lacrosse League venues
Team	Arena	Years used	Capacity	Opened	Location	Reference
Albany Attack	MVP Arena	2000–2003	14,236	1990	Albany, New York	
Albany FireWolves	MVP Arena	2021–2025	14,236	1990	Albany, New York	
Anaheim Storm	Arrowhead Pond	2004–2005	17,174	1993	Anaheim, California	
Arizona Sting	Gila River Arena	2004–2007	17,125	2003	Glendale, Arizona	
Baltimore Thunder	Baltimore Arena	1987–1999	10,582	1962	Baltimore, Maryland	
Boston Blazers (1992–1997)	Boston Garden	1992–1995	14,448	1928	Boston, Massachusetts	
Boston Blazers (1992–1997)	TD Garden	1996–1997	17,850	1995	Boston, Massachusetts	
Boston Blazers (2009–2011)	TD Garden	2009–2011	17,850	1995	Boston, Massachusetts	
Buffalo Bandits	Buffalo Memorial Auditorium	1992–1996	16,433	1940	Buffalo, New York	
Columbus Landsharks	Nationwide Arena	2001–2003	18,500	2000	Columbus, Ohio	
Charlotte Cobras	Independence Arena	1996	9,605	1955	Charlotte, North Carolina	
Chicago Shamrox	Sears Center	2006–2008	8,329	2006	Hoffman Estates, Illinois	
Detroit Turbos	Joe Louis Arena	1989–1994	19,875	1979	Detroit, Michigan	
Edmonton Rush	Rexall Place	2006–2015	17,100	1974	Edmonton, Alberta	
Las Vegas Desert Dogs	Michelob Ultra Arena	2022–2024	12,000	1999	Paradise, Nevada	
Minnesota Swarm	Xcel Energy Center	2005–2015	17,954	2000	Saint Paul, Minnesota	
Montreal Express	Molson Centre	2002	21,273	1996	Montreal, Quebec	
New England Black Wolves	Mohegan Sun Arena	2015–2020	10,000	2001	Uncasville, Connecticut	
New England Blazers	Worcester Centrum	1989–1991	12,135	1982	Worcester, Massachusetts	
New Jersey Storm	Izod Center	2001–2003	19,040	1981	East Rutherford, New Jersey	
New York Riptide	Nassau Coliseum	2020–2024	13,900	1972	Uniondale, New York	
New York Saints	Nassau Coliseum	1989–2003	13,900	1972	Uniondale, New York	
New York Titans	Madison Square Garden	2007–2009	18,006	1968	New York City, New York	
New York Titans	Prudential Center	2009	17,625	2007	Newark, New Jersey	
Orlando Titans	Amway Arena	2010	15,948	1987	Orlando, Florida	
Ottawa Black Bears	Canadian Tire Centre	2024–2026; 2001–2002	18,655	1996	Kanata, Ontario	
Ottawa Rebel	Canadian Tire Centre	2024–2026; 2001–2002	18,655	1996	Kanata, Ontario	
Ottawa Rebel	Ottawa Civic Center	2002–2003	10,575	1967	Ottawa, Ontario	
Panther City Lacrosse Club	Dickies Arena	2021–2024	14,000	2019	Fort Worth, Texas	
Philadelphia Wings (1987–2014) (2019–2026)	Wachovia Spectrum	1987–1996	17,380	1967	Philadelphia, Pennsylvania	
Philadelphia Wings (1987–2014) (2019–2026)	Xfinity Mobile Arena	1997–2014; 2019–2026	19,173	1996	Philadelphia, Pennsylvania	
Pittsburgh Bulls	Civic Arena	1990–1993	16,940	1961	Pittsburgh, Pennsylvania	
Pittsburgh CrosseFire	Civic Arena	2000	16,940	1961	Pittsburgh, Pennsylvania	
Portland LumberJax	Rose Garden	2006–2009	18,280	1995	Portland, Oregon	
San Diego Seals	Pechanga Arena	2018–2026	12,290	1966	San Diego, California	
San Jose Stealth	SAP Center	2004–2009	17,435	1993	San Jose, California	
Syracuse Smash	War Memorial at Oncenter	1998–2000	5,800	1951	Syracuse, New York	
Toronto Rock (Ontario Raiders)	Paramount Fine Foods Centre	2025	5,420	1998	Mississauga, Ontario	
Toronto Rock (Ontario Raiders)	Maple Leaf Gardens	1999–2000	15,726	1931	Toronto, Ontario	
Toronto Rock (Ontario Raiders)	Air Canada Centre	2001–2020	18,819	1999	Toronto, Ontario	
Vancouver Warriors (Vancouver Stealth)	Langley Events Centre	2013–2018	5,276	2009	Langley, British Columbia	
Washington Power	MCI Center	2001–2002	18,573	1997	Washington, D.C.	
Washington Stealth	Xfinity Arena	2010–2013	8,149	2003	Everett, Washington	
Washington Wave	Capital Centre	1987–1989	18,130	1973	Landover, Maryland	

== Outdoor venues ==
Host team	Venue	Event	Year used	Attendance	Location	Ref(s)
San Diego Seals	Snapdragon Stadium	Stadium Showdown	2023	8,443	San Diego, California	Recap
