= Mike McLellan =

Canadian lacrosse player

Personal information
- Nickname: The Maestro
- Born: September 4, 1981 (age 44) Toronto, Ontario, Canada
- Height: 6 ft 2 in (188 cm)
- Weight: 190 lb (86 kg; 13 st 8 lb)

Sport
- Position: Forward
- Shoots: Right
- NLL draft: 14th overall, 2005; Edmonton Rush
- NLL team Former teams: Philadelphia Wings; Colorado Mammoth; Orlando Titans; New York Titans; Arizona Sting
- MLL teams: Hamilton Nationals
- Pro career: 2005–

Mike McLellan (born September 4, 1981) is an indoor lacrosse player for the Philadelphia Wings in the National Lacrosse League and an outdoor lacrosse player formerly of the Hamilton Nationals of Major League Lacrosse. Nicknamed "The Maestro", he played college lacrosse at Mercyhurst University and was named a two-time NCAA Division II All-American.

McLellan was drafted 14th overall by the Edmonton Rush in the 2005 NLL Entry Draft, and was immediately traded to the Arizona Sting. The following year McLellan was acquired by the New York Titans in the 2006 NLL Expansion Draft.

In week 14 of the 2007 NLL season, McLellan was awarded Rookie of the Week honors. Was named to the NLL ALL Rookie Team.

On August 6, 2010, McLellan was selected by the Toronto Rock in the NLL Dispersal Draft of Orlando Titans players. He was then traded by the Rock and to the Colorado Mammoth for a second round pick in the 2011 draft. Signed as a free agent with the Philadelphia Wings in 2011. Retired from pro lacrosse before the start of the 2014 season ending a 9-year pro career.

Plays for the Mama's on the Hill team in the Brentwood Hockey League on Sunday nights in St. Louis, MO.

== Statistics ==
=== NLL ===
		Regular Season						Playoffs
Season	Team	GP	G	A	Pts	LB	PIM	GP	G	A	Pts	LB	PIM
2006	Arizona	8	11	16	27	14	12	0	0	0	0	0	0
2007	New York	16	26	28	54	49	8	--	--	--	--	--	--
2008	New York	16	34	22	56	29	10	2	2	0	2	2	0
2009	New York	16	29	24	53	39	4	3	1	4	5	5	0
2010	Orlando	16	22	33	55	35	12	2	5	2	7	3	0
2011	Colorado	9	10	11	21	19	4	--	--	--	--	--	--
2011	Edmonton	6	13	18	21	15	6	--	--	--	--	--	--
NLL totals		87	145	152	287	200	56	7	8	6	14	10	0
