= Brenden Thenhaus =

Canadian lacrosse player

Personal information
- Nationality: Canadian
- Born: August 5, 1986 (age 39)
- Height: 6 ft 2 in (188 cm)
- Weight: 210 lb (95 kg; 15 st 0 lb)

Sport
- Position: Forward
- Shoots: Right
- NLL draft: 37th overall, 2006; Buffalo Bandits
- NLL team Former teams: Toronto Rock; Boston Blazers; Edmonton Rush; Philadelphia Wings; Buffalo Bandits
- MSL team: Kitchener Kodiaks
- Pro career: 2007–

Brenden Thenhaus (born August 5, 1986) is a Canadian box lacrosse player for the Toronto Rock in the National Lacrosse League.

== Professional career ==
Thenhaus began his National Lacrosse League career with the Buffalo Bandits in the 2007 NLL season. He was acquired by the Wings as a free agent prior to the 2008 NLL season. Thenhaus scored his first career goal while with the Bandits against the Wings. On February 28, 2008, Thenhaus was traded to the Edmonton Rush in exchange for a second round pick in the 2008 National Lacrosse League entry draft. Thenhaus joined the Boston Blazers for their inaugural season during the 2009 NLL season. After two seasons in Boston, Thenhaus was acquired by the Buffalo Bandits in the Blazers' dispersal draft. He played one year in Buffalo before being signed to a contract by the Toronto Rock.

== Canadian Box career ==
In 2006, Thenhaus led the OLA Junior B Lacrosse League in scoring and won the Founders Cup National Title as a member of the Oakville Buzz. Thenhaus was drafted in the first round (second overall) in the 2008 Major Series Lacrosse Draft by the Brampton Excelsiors.

== Hockey career ==
Thenhaus also played ice hockey with Burlington Cougars of the Ontario Provincial Junior A Hockey League.

== Statistics ==
=== NLL ===
Brenden Thenhaus		Regular season									Playoffs								
Season	Team	GP	G	A	Pts	LB	PIM	Pts/GP	LB/GP	PIM/GP	GP	G	A	Pts	LB	PIM	Pts/GP	LB/GP	PIM/GP
2007	Buffalo Bandits	4	2	2	4	12	2	1.00	3.00	0.50	–	–	–	–	–	–	–	–	–
2008	Philadelphia Wings	3	1	1	2	13	0	0.67	4.33	0.00	–	–	–	–	–	–	–	–	–
2008	Edmonton Rush	7	2	6	8	28	4	1.14	4.00	0.57	–	–	–	–	–	–	–	–	–
2009	Boston Blazers	16	27	26	53	67	6	3.31	4.19	0.38	1	3	1	4	2	0	4.00	2.00	0.00
2010	Boston Blazers	11	17	18	35	45	15	3.18	4.09	1.36	–	–	–	–	–	–	–	–	–
2011	Buffalo Bandits	16	17	18	35	42	8	2.19	2.63	0.50	2	0	2	2	13	0	1.00	6.50	0.00
2012	Toronto Rock	12	10	11	21	31	8	1.75	2.58	0.67	2	2	2	4	9	0	2.00	4.50	0.00
		69	76	82	158	238	43	2.29	3.45	0.62	5	5	5	10	24	0	2.00	4.80	0.00
Career Total:		74	81	87	168	262	43	2.27	3.54	0.58									

GP–Games played; G–Goals; A–Assists; Pts–Points; LB–Loose balls; PIM–Penalty minutes; Pts/GP–Points per games played; LB/GP–Loose balls per games played; PIM/GP–Penalty minutes per games played.
