= Jimmy Quinlan =

Canadian lacrosse player and coach

Personal information
- Born: December 2, 1981 (age 44) Edmonton, Alberta, Canada
- Height: 5 ft 11 in (180 cm)
- Weight: 178 lb (81 kg; 12 st 10 lb)

Sport
- Position: Forward
- Shoots: Left
- NLL draft: 53rd overall, 2001; Calgary Roughnecks
- NLL team Former teams: Saskatchewan Rush; Toronto Rock
- Pro career: 2005–

Jimmy Quinlan (born December 2, 1981, in Edmonton, Alberta) is a Canadian former lacrosse player and current head coach for the Saskatchewan Rush in the National Lacrosse League and 3-time NLL champion.

== Professional career ==
Quinlan was acquired by the Edmonton Rush after playing his rookie season with the 2005 Champion's Cup Toronto Rock. Quinlan was named Transition Player of the Week for his 5-point effort in week 6 of the 2008 NLL season.

Quinlan played with the Coquitlam Adanacs from 2003 to 2006, prior to joining the Sherwood Park Outlaws of the Rocky Mountain Lacrosse League to capture the Presidents Cup in 2007.

Quinlan retired as a player after the 2013 season as the last original player from season 1 of the Edmonton Rush and became the defensive coach for the Edmonton Rush. His career spanned 9 seasons (Toronto Rock and Edmonton Rush) over 108 games, only missing one game in that time.

On January 17, 2013, the Edmonton Rush Honored Jimmy by retiring his number 81 to the rafters of Rexall Place, joining the ranks of NHL Mark Messier, Wayne Gretzky, Paul Coffey, Jari Kurri, Al Hamilton, Grant Fuhr, Glenn Anderson and Edmonton Oilers Play By Play Announcer Rod Philips. Demotix.com

Outside of playing in the NLL, Quinlan is a grade 7 and 9 mathematics teacher at Vimy Ridge Academy in Edmonton, Alberta.

== Statistics ==
=== NLL ===
		Regular Season						Playoffs
Season	Team	GP	G	A	Pts	LB	PIM	GP	G	A	Pts	LB	PIM
2005	Toronto	8	6	4	10	24	25	1	0	1	1	3	2
2006	Edmonton	16	20	19	39	86	24	--	--	--	--	--	--
2007	Edmonton	16	23	32	55	74	25	--	--	--	--	--	--
2008	Edmonton	16	22	31	53	76	18	--	--	--	--	--	--
2009	Edmonton	15	16	15	31	60	41	--	--	--	--	--	--
2010	Edmonton	16	8	6	14	87	21	2	1	1	2	8	0
2011	Edmonton	16	6	5	11	74	12	--	--	--	--	--	--
2012	Edmonton	16	4	3	7	50	4	3	1	0	1	5	4
2013	Edmonton	16	1	8	9	37	5	1	0	1	1	2	2
NLL totals		135	106	123	229	568	175	7	2	3	5	18	8

=== NLL coaching statistics ===
Team	Season	Regular Season				Playoffs				Playoff result
Team	Season	GC	W	L	W%	GC	W	L	W%	Playoff result
Saskatchewan Rush	2022*	4	4	0	1.000	–	–	–	–	Did not qualify
Saskatchewan Rush	2023	18	8	10	.444	–	–	–	–	Did not qualify
Saskatchewan Rush	2024	18	8	10	.444	–	–	–	–	Did not qualify
Saskatchewan Rush	2025	18	13	5	.722	6	4	2	.667	Lost NLL Finals (BUF)
Saskatchewan Rush	2026	18	12	6	.667	1	0	1	.000	Lost Quarterfinals (TOR)
Totals:	5	76	45	31	.592	7	4	3	.571	

* - shared head coach duties with Derek Keenan
