= Brodie MacDonald =

Canadian lacrosse player

Personal information
- Nationality: Canadian
- Born: September 11, 1989 (age 36) Vernon, British Columbia, Canada
- Height: 6 ft 7 in (201 cm)
- Weight: 245 lb (111 kg; 17 st 7 lb)

Sport
- Position: Goalie
- NLL draft: 19th overall, 2010; Philadelphia Wings
- NLL team: Former Teams. Georgia Swarm Minnesota Swarm Vancouver Stealth Edmonton Rush Langley Thunder WLA
- Pro career: 2010-2018–

Brodie MacDonald (born September 11, 1989) is a Canadian former professional box lacrosse goaltender who last played for the Vancouver Stealth of the National Lacrosse League. MacDonald was drafted in the second round (19th overall) in the 2010 National Lacrosse League entry draft by the Philadelphia Wings.

== Statistics ==
=== NLL ===
		Regular Season						Playoffs
Season	Team	GP	Min	GA	Sv	GAA	Sv %	GP	Min	GA	Sv	GAA	Sv %
2012	Edmonton	13	22	8	8	21.82	50.0%	3	1	0	2	0	100%
2013	Edmonton	16	112	15	58	8.04	79.5%	1	0	0	0	0	-
2014	Edmonton	18	74	10	47	8.11	82.5%	3	0	0	0	0	-
2015	Minnesota	17	261	61	175	14.02	74.2%	-	-	-	-	-	-
2016	Georgia	18	823	176	526	12.82	74.9%	1	60	14	38	13.78	73%
2017	Georgia	17	153	30	99	11.70	76.7%	4	-	-	-	-	-
2018	Vancouver	13	239	54	160	13.51	74.8%	-	-	-	-	-	-
NLL totals		112	1684	354	1073	12.61	75.2%	12	60	14	40	14.00	74.1%
