= Tom Johnson (lacrosse) =

Canadian lacrosse player

Personal information
- Nationality: Canadian
- Born: November 18, 1985 (age 39) Vancouver, British Columbia, Canada
- Height: 6 ft 2 in (188 cm)
- Weight: 205 lb (93 kg; 14 st 9 lb)

Sport
- Position: Forward
- NLL draft: 7th overall, 2007; San Jose Stealth
- NLL team: Edmonton Rush
- Pro career: 2007–

Tom Johnson (born November 18, 1985, in Vancouver, British Columbia), is a professional lacrosse forward for the Edmonton Rush of the National Lacrosse League and the Burnaby Lakers of the Western Lacrosse Association (WLA).

== NLL career ==
Johnson was elected in the first round (seventh overall) in the 2007 National Lacrosse League entry draft out of Bellarmine University.

2008 Season: Johnson played in eight regular season games in his rookie season scoring eight goals and adding seven assists for 15 points. He was named NLL Rookie of the Week for his five-point performance (two goals, three assists) in a 14–6 win over Edmonton on April 11. He scored a goal and added an assist against Portland in the first round of the playoffs.

2009 Season: He scored two goals and one assist in the season opening 12–10 loss to the Calgary Roughnecks on January 9.

== WLA career ==
Johnson currently plays for the Maple Ridge Burrards of the WLA in the summer after being released from the Langley Thunder. He was awarded the Ed Bayley Trophy as the 2007 WLA Rookie of the Year in 2007 after scoring 27 goals and 27 assists for 54 points. Johnson was the Thunder's first round WLA draft pick out of the Junior A lacrosse Delta Islanders where he holds the all-time scoring record.

== Statistics ==
=== NLL ===
		Regular Season						Playoffs
Season	Team	GP	G	A	Pts	LB	PIM	GP	G	A	Pts	LB	PIM
2008	San Jose	8	8	7	15	18	2	1	1	1	2	2	0
2009	San Jose	14	20	13	33	64	33	2	2	1	3	8	0
2010	Washington	7	9	8	17	18	4	1	0	0	0	0	0
2011	Washington	12	10	8	18	32	11	--	--	--	--	--	--
2012	Edmonton	14	14	13	17	30	10	3	3	0	3	5	7
NLL totals		55	61	49	110	162	31	7	6	2	8	15	7
