= Derek Suddons =

Canadian lacrosse player (born 1978)

Personal information
- Nationality: Canadian
- Born: October 6, 1978 (age 47)
- Height: 6 ft 1 in (185 cm)
- Weight: 222 lb (101 kg; 15 st 12 lb)

Sport
- Position: Defense
- Shoots: Left
- NLL draft: 4th overall, 2001; Columbus Landsharks
- NLL teams: New England Black Wolves (2016-2018); Buffalo Bandits (2013-2015); Edmonton Rush (2009-12); Toronto Rock (2004-09); Columbus Landsharks (2002-03)
- MSL team: Brooklin Redmen (2010-2019)
- Pro career: 2002–

Derek Suddons (born October 6, 1978) is a Canadian professional box lacrosse player who most recently played for the New England Black Wolves of the National Lacrosse League and the Brooklin Redmen of Major Series Lacrosse. A member of the 1997 and 1999 Minto Cup winning Whitby Warriors club, Suddons played lacrosse collegiality for the University of Hartford Hawks. He was drafted by the Columbus Landsharks in the first round of the 2001 NLL Entry Draft, and has since enjoyed a lengthy career in the NLL.

Suddons began his NLL career in the 2001 with the beleaguered Columbus Landsharks. When the Landsharks moved to Phoenix, Arizona, becoming the Arizona Sting, Suddons opted to sign with the Toronto Rock so that he could be closer to his Whitby, Ontario hometown. Suddons won the 2005 championship with the Rock, and played with the club until early in the 2009 NLL season, when he was traded, along with Ryan Benesch, to the Edmonton Rush. His four years with the Rush were capped with a loss in the 2012 Champions Cup match against the Rochester Knighthawks, at which point Suddons once again chose to go back east, signing with the Buffalo Bandits. He signed with the New England Black Wolves prior to the 2016 season.

== Statistics ==
=== NLL ===
Derek Suddons		Regular season									Playoffs								
Season	Team	GP	G	A	Pts	LB	PIM	Pts/GP	LB/GP	PIM/GP	GP	G	A	Pts	LB	PIM	Pts/GP	LB/GP	PIM/GP
2002	Columbus Landsharks	16	2	11	13	138	7	0.81	8.63	0.44	–	–	–	–	–	–	–	–	–
2003	Columbus Landsharks	16	2	3	5	87	11	0.31	5.44	0.69	–	–	–	–	–	–	–	–	–
2004	Toronto Rock	16	0	4	4	31	4	0.25	1.94	0.25	1	0	0	0	3	0	0.00	3.00	0.00
2005	Toronto Rock	15	0	7	7	54	8	0.47	3.60	0.53	2	0	2	2	4	0	1.00	2.00	0.00
2006	Toronto Rock	16	0	10	10	84	10	0.63	5.25	0.63	1	0	0	0	3	4	0.00	3.00	4.00
2007	Toronto Rock	16	2	7	9	55	6	0.56	3.44	0.38	1	0	0	0	3	0	0.00	3.00	0.00
2008	Toronto Rock	12	2	3	5	35	2	0.42	2.92	0.17	–	–	–	–	–	–	–	–	–
2009	Edmonton Rush	14	0	0	0	36	11	0.00	2.57	0.79	–	–	–	–	–	–	–	–	–
2010	Edmonton Rush	15	1	4	5	47	16	0.33	3.13	1.07	2	0	0	0	6	4	0.00	3.00	2.00
2011	Edmonton Rush	16	1	6	7	38	4	0.44	2.38	0.25	–	–	–	–	–	–	–	–	–
2012	Edmonton Rush	16	6	6	12	50	14	0.75	3.13	0.88	3	1	2	3	10	4	1.00	3.33	1.33
2013	Buffalo Bandits	13	1	1	2	33	4	0.15	2.54	0.31	–	–	–	–	–	–	–	–	–
2014	Buffalo Bandits	17	0	5	5	51	4	0.29	3.00	0.24	3	0	2	2	9	4	0.67	3.00	1.33
2015	Buffalo Bandits	17	1	2	3	39	2	0.18	2.29	0.12	1	0	0	0	3	0	0.00	3.00	0.00
2016	New England Black Wolves	18	2	5	7	60	4	0.39	3.33	0.22	3	1	0	1	5	7	0.33	1.67	2.33
2017	New England Black Wolves	17	0	6	6	49	0	0.35	2.88	0.00	1	0	1	1	2	0	1.00	2.00	0.00
2018	New England Black Wolves	17	0	6	6	32	2	0.35	1.88	0.12	1	0	0	0	4	0	0.00	4.00	0.00
		267	20	86	106	919	109	0.40	3.44	0.41	19	2	7	9	52	23	0.47	2.74	1.21
Career Total:		286	22	93	115	971	132	0.40	3.40	0.46									

GP–Games played; G–Goals; A–Assists; Pts–Points; LB–Loose balls; PIM–Penalty minutes; Pts/GP–Points per games played; LB/GP–Loose balls per games played; PIM/GP–Penalty minutes per games played.
