= Peter McFetridge =

Canadian lacrosse player (born 1986)

Personal information
- Nationality: Canadian
- Born: March 18, 1986 (age 40) Vancouver, British Columbia, Canada
- Height: 6 ft 3 in (191 cm)
- Weight: 205 lb (93 kg; 14 st 9 lb)

Sport
- Position: Transition
- Shoots: Right
- NLL draft: 10th overall, 2007; Calgary Roughnecks
- NLL teams: Calgary Roughnecks; Vancouver Stealth
- WLA team: Burnaby Lakers
- Pro career: 2008–2018

Peter McFetridge (born March 18, 1986, in Vancouver, British Columbia) is a Canadian former professional box lacrosse transition. He played for the Vancouver Stealth and Calgary Roughnecks in the National Lacrosse League.
