= Tyler Codron =

Canadian lacrosse player (born 1986)

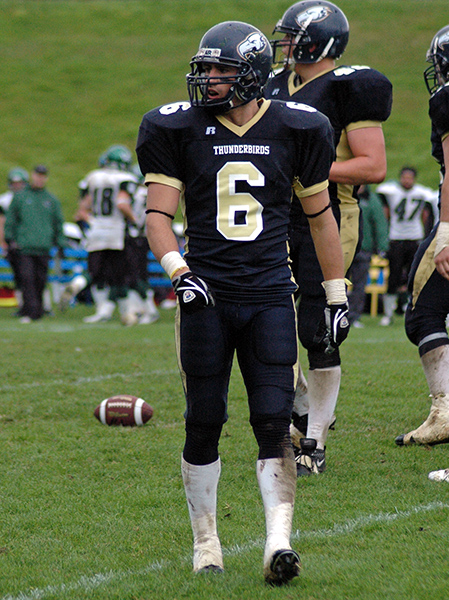

Personal information
- Nationality: Canadian
- Born: October 20, 1986 (age 39) Port Coquitlam, British Columbia, Canada
- Height: 6 ft 0 in (183 cm)
- Weight: 200 lb (91 kg; 14 st 4 lb)

Sport
- Position: Defense
- NLL draft: 6th overall, 2007; Portland Lumberjax
- NLL team Former teams: Vancouver Warriors; Edmonton Rush; Colorado Mammoth; Portland LumberJax; Washington Stealth
- Pro career: 2008–

Tyler Codron (born October 20, 1986, in Port Coquitlam, British Columbia) is a professional lacrosse player for the Vancouver Warriors in the National Lacrosse League. He previously played for the Portland LumberJax, Washington Stealth, Edmonton Rush and Colorado Mammoth. He also formerly played football for the University of British Columbia.

Codron was drafted in the first round (6th overall) in the 2006 NLL Entry Draft by the Portland LumberJax. He played his first two seasons with Portland and was named to the 2008 NLL Rookie Team. After the Portland LumberJax folded, he was selected by the Toronto Rock 2nd overall in the 2009 dispersal draft. He did not start the season with the Rock due to a torn ACL. In December 2009, he was traded from the Rock along with Joel Dalgarno and Lewis Ratcliff to the Washington Stealth for Colin Doyle and a 2nd-round pick in the 2012 NLL Entry Draft. In the 2015 season, he won the Jay Jalbert Award as the Mammoth Teammate of the Year.

== Statistics ==
=== NLL ===
		Regular Season						Playoffs
Season	Team	GP	G	A	Pts	LB	PIM	GP	G	A	Pts	LB	PIM
2008	Portland	16	3	8	11	68	28	3	0	1	1	15	2
2009	Portland	16	5	9	14	89	26	1	0	1	1	6	0
2010	Washington	1	0	0	0	1	0	2	0	0	0	7	2
2011	Washington	8	0	0	0	9	10	--	--	--	--	--	--
2011	Edmonton	9	0	0	0	17	4	--	--	--	--	--	--
2012	Edmonton	15	0	4	4	33	6	3	0	1	1	7	4
2015	Colorado	18	1	3	4	42	13	1	0	0	0	0	4
2019	Vancouver	18	1	2	3	36	14	--	--	--	--	--	--
2020	Vancouver	13	0	3	3	41	8	--	--	--	--	--	--
2022	Vancouver	18	0	5	5	41	8	--	--	--	--	--	--
NLL totals		132	10	34	44	377	117	10	0	3	3	35	12
