= Andrew McBride (lacrosse) =

Canadian lacrosse player

Personal information
- Nickname: The Legend
- Nationality: Canadian
- Born: December 9, 1982 (age 42) Ladner, British Columbia
- Height: 6 ft 0 in (183 cm)
- Weight: 185 lb (84 kg; 13 st 3 lb)

Sport
- Position: Defenceman
- Shoots: Right
- NLL draft: 14th overall, 2002; Calgary Roughnecks
- NLL team: Calgary Roughnecks
- Pro career: 2003–

Andrew McBride (born December 9, 1982) is a Canadian professional box lacrosse player for the Calgary Roughnecks in the National Lacrosse League (NLL) and Coquitlam Adanacs of the Western Lacrosse Association (WLA). He was the fourth overall selection by the Roughnecks at the 2002 NLL Draft, and has played for Calgary since the 2003 season, and has won two Champion's Cup titles with the team in 2004 and 2009. Additionally, he won the Presidents Cup, Canada's senior B championship, in 2004. McBride also competed in the 2015 World Indoor Lacrosse Championships for the Ireland national team.

== Statistics ==
=== NLL ===
		Regular Season						Playoffs
Season	Team	GP	G	A	Pts	LB	PIM	GP	G	A	Pts	LB	PIM
2003	Calgary	13	0	3	3	43	30	1	0	0	0	3	0
2004	Calgary	15	2	9	11	54	31	3	2	0	2	14	4
2005	Calgary	16	6	8	14	60	44	1	0	1	1	4	0
2006	Calgary	16	1	5	6	48	22	1	0	0	0	3	0
2007	Calgary	16	3	12	15	68	32	1	0	0	0	2	5
2008	Calgary	15	3	6	9	84	46	2	0	3	3	13	2
2009	Calgary	16	1	10	11	63	27	2	0	1	1	12	0
2010	Calgary	15	0	5	5	66	18	1	0	0	0	4	0
2011	Calgary	13	1	3	4	54	22	2	1	0	1	3	2
2012	Calgary	16	1	1	2	35	49	1	0	0	0	2	2
2013	Calgary	16	1	3	4	47	23	2	0	5	5	7	2
2014	Calgary	15	0	2	2	52	18	5	0	2	2	20	17
NLL totals		182	19	67	86	614	335	23	3	12	15	83	34
