= Ryan Ward (lacrosse) =

Canadian lacrosse player (born 1980)

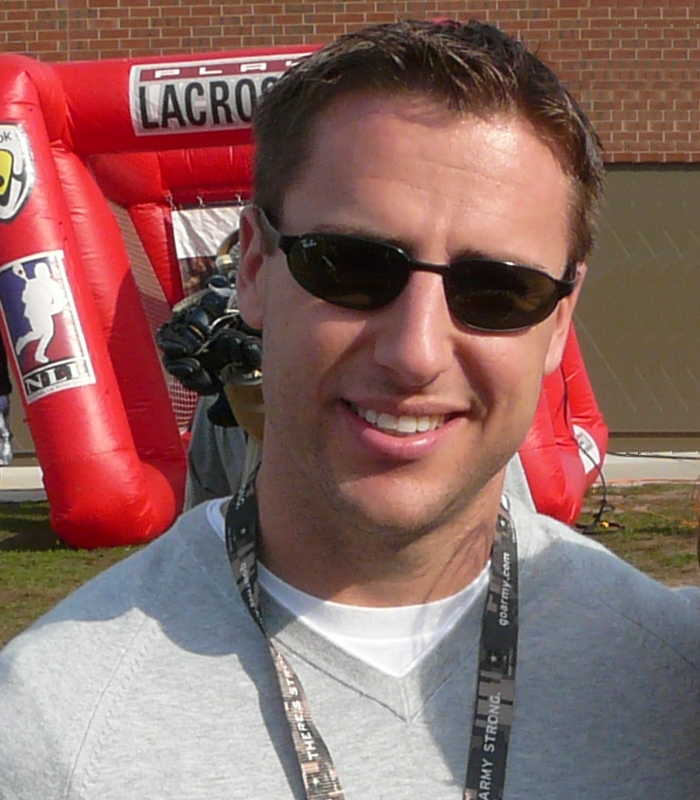

Personal information
- Nickname: Wardo/Wardball
- Nationality: Canadian, American
- Born: September 26, 1980 (age 45) Victoria, British Columbia, Canada
- Height: 5 ft 9 in (175 cm)
- Weight: 190 lb (86 kg; 13 st 8 lb)

Sport
- Position: Forward
- Shoots: Right
- NCAA team: Butler University
- NLL draft: 3rd overall, 2003; Philadelphia Wings
- NLL teams: Edmonton Rush; Minnesota Swarm; Philadelphia Wings
- MLL teams: Rochester Rattlers
- Pro career: 2004–2014

Ryan Ward (born September 26, 1980) is a Canadian-American former professional lacrosse player. Ward played 11 seasons in the NLL with the Philadelphia Wings, Minnesota Swarm, and Edmonton Rush. He retired after the 2014 season.

Ward is a two-time Mann Cup winner (in 2003 and 2005) with the Victoria Shamrocks of the Western Lacrosse Association. In 2003, he was awarded the Western Lacrosse Association MVP award. Ward was also a junior high Physical Education teacher in Owatonna, Minnesota. He is also the founder of Twin Cities Lacrosse; a lacrosse club based in the southwest metro area of Minnesota.

== Beginning and overview ==
Ward has been playing lacrosse since the age of three. For the last 25 years, he has played in top indoor and outdoor leagues across North America. He has spent most of his free time coaching youth lacrosse camps and clinics throughout the Twin Cities. Ward currently resides in Chanhassen, Minnesota. He is also the Varsity Head Coach of the Eden Prairie High School lacrosse team.

== College career ==
Ward is a graduate of Butler University. As a senior, he was named Team Captain, and still holds the school record for assists.

== Professional career ==
Ward was selected by the Rochester Rattlers of Major League Lacrosse as a first-round selection (2nd overall) in the 2004 MLL Collegiate Draft. He played one season in the league.

The Philadelphia Wings drafted Ward in the first round (3rd overall) in the 2003 NLL Entry Draft. As a rookie, he was awarded Rookie of the Week honors in week 8 of the season and named to the 2004 NLL All-Rookie Team. During the 2005 NLL season, Ward was traded to the Minnesota Swarm. In the 2006 NLL season, he was awarded Offensive Player of the Week honors in week 12 for his ten-point game against the Portland LumberJax, and helped lead the Swarm to their first playoff appearance. In 2007, he was elected to his first National Lacrosse League All-Star Game and again helped lead his team back to the playoffs. In 2008, Ward was again named to the All-Star team, replacing the injured Casey Powell.

== Statistics ==
=== NLL ===
		Regular Season						Playoffs
Season	Team	GP	G	A	Pts	LB	PIM	GP	G	A	Pts	LB	PIM
2004	Philadelphia	13	18	19	37	45	0	--	--	--	--	--	--
2005	Philadelphia	5	5	2	7	23	2	--	--	--	--	--	--
2005	Minnesota	11	19	25	44	53	2	--	--	--	--	--	--
2006	Minnesota	16	19	47	66	37	16	1	2	3	5	3	0
2007	Minnesota	15	23	52	75	44	6	1	1	0	1	2	0
2008	Minnesota	16	33	36	69	56	10	1	0	3	3	1	0
2009	Minnesota	15	20	36	56	58	4	--	--	--	--	--	--
2010	Edmonton	16	31	43	74	33	2	2	3	12	15	7	0
2011	Edmonton	16	25	33	58	33	4	--	--	--	--	--	--
2012	Edmonton	16	19	38	57	38	4	3	10	11	21	4	0
2013	Edmonton	16	21	54	75	29	6	1	0	3	3	2	0
2014	Philadelphia	17	14	46	60	48	0	--	--	--	--	--	--
NLL totals		172	247	431	678	497	56	9	16	32	48	19	0
