= 2010 Buffalo Bandits season =

2010 Buffalo Bandits
- League: NLL
- Division: 3rd East
- 2010 record: 8–8
- Home record: 4–4
- Road record: 4–4
- Goals for: 169
- Goals against: 170
- General Manager: Scott Loffler (Director of Lacrosse Operations)
- Coach: Darris Kilgour
- Alternate captains: Mike Accursi; John Tavares
- Arena: HSBC Arena

Team leaders
- Goals: Mark Steenhuis (36)
- Assists: Mark Steenhuis (54)
- Points: Mark Steenhuis (90)
- Penalties in minutes: Brandon Francis (53); Ian Llord (53)
- Loose Balls: Tom Montour (112)
- Wins: Mike Thompson (5)
- Goals against average: Mike Thompson (9.92)

The Buffalo Bandits are a lacrosse team based in Buffalo, New York playing in the National Lacrosse League (NLL). The 2010 season was the franchise's 19th season.

This was the Bandits' first season without longtime transition player Rich Kilgour, as he retired in September 2009. Kilgour had been on the Bandits since their inaugural season in 1992. The Bandits finished the 2010 season with an 8–8 record, tied for 3rd in the East. Buffalo qualified for the playoffs, but they ultimately fell to the Toronto Rock, 13–11, in the Division Semifinal.

== Regular season ==
=== Conference standings ===
East Division
P	Team	GP	W	L	PCT	GB	Home	Road	GF	GA	Diff	GF/GP	GA/GP
1	Orlando Titans – xy	16	11	5	.688	0.0	5–3	6–2	172	154	+18	10.75	9.62
2	Toronto Rock – x	16	9	7	.562	2.0	6–2	3–5	197	156	+41	12.31	9.75
3	Buffalo Bandits – x	16	8	8	.500	3.0	4–4	4–4	169	170	−1	10.56	10.62
4	Boston Blazers – x	16	8	8	.500	3.0	5–3	3–5	161	162	−1	10.06	10.12
5	Rochester Knighthawks	16	7	9	.438	4.0	4–4	3–5	155	181	−26	9.69	11.31
6	Philadelphia Wings	16	5	11	.312	6.0	3–5	2–6	168	194	−26	10.50	12.12

West Division
P	Team	GP	W	L	PCT	GB	Home	Road	GF	GA	Diff	GF/GP	GA/GP
1	Washington Stealth – xyz	16	11	5	.688	0.0	6–2	5–3	211	179	+32	13.19	11.19
2	Calgary Roughnecks – x	16	10	6	.625	1.0	5–3	5–3	193	169	+24	12.06	10.56
3	Edmonton Rush – x	16	10	6	.625	1.0	5–3	5–3	186	201	−15	11.62	12.56
4	Minnesota Swarm – x	16	5	11	.312	6.0	3–5	2–6	189	201	−12	11.81	12.56
5	Colorado Mammoth	16	4	12	.250	7.0	0–8	4–4	167	201	−34	10.44	12.56

x: Clinched playoff berth; c: Clinched playoff berth by crossing over to another division; y: Clinched division; z: Clinched best regular season record; GP: Games Played
W: Wins; L: Losses; GB: Games back; PCT: Win percentage; Home: Record at Home; Road: Record on the Road; GF: Goals scored; GA: Goals allowed
Differential: Difference between goals scored and allowed; GF/GP: Average number of goals scored per game; GA/GP: Average number of goals allowed per game

=== Game log ===
Game	Date	Opponent	Location	Score	OT	Attendance	Record
1	January 8, 2010	@ Rochester Knighthawks	Blue Cross Arena	L 5–10		8,192	0–1
2	January 16, 2010	Rochester Knighthawks	HSBC Arena	L 11–13		17,207	0–2
3	January 22, 2010	@ Washington Stealth	Comcast Arena at Everett	L 11–13		2,879	0–3
4	January 23, 2010	@ Edmonton Rush	Rexall Place	L 7–11		7,102	0–4
5	January 30, 2010	Minnesota Swarm	HSBC Arena	W 11–7		15,636	1–4
6	February 6, 2010	Toronto Rock	HSBC Arena	L 10–14		14,467	1–5
7	February 13, 2010	@ Philadelphia Wings	Wachovia Center	W 13–11		7,723	2–5
8	February 27, 2010	Philadelphia Wings	HSBC Arena	L 11–15		15,336	2–6
9	March 6, 2010	Orlando Titans	HSBC Arena	W 12–10		16,184	3–6
10	March 12, 2010	@ Toronto Rock	Air Canada Centre	W 11–10	OT	8,567	4–6
11	March 13, 2010	@ Boston Blazers	TD Banknorth Garden	W 9–8	OT	9,062	5–6
12	March 27, 2010	@ Rochester Knighthawks	Blue Cross Arena	W 14–7		10,652	6–6
13	April 3, 2010	Colorado Mammoth	HSBC Arena	L 11–12	OT	16,951	6–7
14	April 10, 2010	Toronto Rock	HSBC Arena	W 13–10		18,575	7–7
15	April 16, 2010	@ Orlando Titans	Amway Arena	L 7–9		7,399	7–8
16	April 24, 2010	Boston Blazers	HSBC Arena	W 13–10		18,480	8–8

== Playoffs ==
=== Game log ===
Game	Date	Opponent	Location	Score	OT	Attendance	Record
Division Semifinal	May 1, 2010	@ Toronto Rock	Air Canada Centre	L 11–13		9,367	0–1

== Player stats ==
=== Runners (Top 10) ===
Player	GP	G	A	Pts	LB	PIM
Mark Steenhuis	16	36	54	90	99	11
John Tavares	10	21	28	49	57	22
Mike Accursi	15	25	19	44	49	16
Kevin Dostie	13	16	17	33	43	0
Brett Bucktooth	16	16	11	27	63	13
Roger Vyse	8	9	18	27	31	4
Frank Resetarits	13	11	12	23	14	0
Tom Montour	14	9	12	21	112	26
Kyle Clancy	6	6	15	21	8	4
Jon Harasym	14	4	10	14	66	32
Totals		169	274	443	1,048	378

=== Goaltenders ===
Player	GP	MIN	W	L	GA	Sv%	GAA
Mike Thompson	11	387:03	5	1	64	.809	9.92
Ken Montour	7	385:33	2	4	70	.788	10.89
Angus Goodleaf	13	189:38	1	3	34	.785	10.75
Totals		962:24	8	8	168	.796	10.47

== Transactions ==
=== New players ===
- Chris Driscoll - acquired in trade
- Jon Harasym - acquired in trade
- Frank Resetarits - acquired in trade

=== Players not returning ===
- Rich Kilgour - retired
- Pat McCready - traded
- Phil Sanderson - traded

=== Trades ===
September 3, 2009	To Buffalo Bandits Jon Harasym	To Philadelphia Wings Fourth round pick, 2009 entry draft
September 3, 2009	To Buffalo Bandits Frank Resetarits	To Washington Stealth Third round pick, 2009 entry draft
August 11, 2009	To Buffalo Bandits Second round pick, 2009 entry draft	To Washington Stealth Jamison Koesterer; Fifth round pick, 2009 entry draft
August 4, 2009	To Buffalo Bandits Second round pick, 2009 entry draft First round pick, 2010 entry draft Second round pick, 2011 entry draft	To Toronto Rock Pat McCready; Third round pick, 2009 entry draft
July 31, 2009	To Buffalo Bandits Chris Driscoll	To Toronto Rock Phil Sanderson

=== Entry draft ===
The 2009 NLL Entry Draft took place on September 9, 2009. The Bandits selected the following players:

Round	Overall	Player	College/Club
1	10	Kyle Clancy	Peterborough, ON
2	15	Chris Corbeil	Brampton, ON
2	21	Steve Priolo	St. Catharines, ON
4	39	Zac McIlmoyle	Peterborough, ON
6	60	Matt Freedman	Canisius College

== Roster ==
2010 Buffalo Bandits roster
Active (21-man) roster		Inactive roster	Coaches
Goaltenders: 66 (Haudenosaunee) Michael Thompson; 55 (Haudenosaunee) Angus Goodleaf; Defensemen: 28 (Haudenosaunee) Clay Hill; 2 (Canada) Ian Llord; 24 (United States) Kyle Schmelzle; 14 (United States) Joe Smith; 6 (Canada) Chris White (C); 23 (Canada) Steve Priolo; 91 (Canada) Darryl Gibson; 15 (Canada) Chris Corbeil; 6 (Canada) Scott Self; -- (Haudenosaunee) Holden Vyse; -- James Purves; -- Travis Irving; -- (Haudenosaunee) Elijah Printup; -- Jordan Costa; -- Wayne Van Every; 34 Ryan Maciaszek	Forwards: 12 (Canada) Brian Croswell; 51 (Canada) Kevin Dostie; 84 (Haudenosaunee) Brandon Francis; 19 (Canada) Sean Greenhalgh; 17 (Haudenosaunee) Brandon Swamp; 11 (Canada) John Tavares (A); 81 (Haudenosaunee) Roger Vyse; 5 (United States) Frank Resetarits; 26 (Haudenosaunee) Brett Bucktooth; 7 (Canada) Jon Harasym; 10 (Canada) Brendan Thenhaus; 17 (Canada) Tracey Kelusky; 54 (Canada) Jason Crosbie; -- Bill McCullough; 19 Jordan Coffey; -- Scott Komer; 88 (Haudenosaunee) Cody Jacobs; Transition: 63 (Haudenosaunee) Thomas Montour; 9 (Canada) Mark Steenhuis; 75 (Canada) Jay Thorimbert	Practice squad: 1 (United States) Jamie Stoddard; -- Zac MacImoyle; Injured reserve: 3 (Canada) Billy Dee Smith; 29 (Haudenosaunee) Ken Montour; -- Matt Friedman; Unable to play: -- Tory Gardner; -- Eryn Jones	Head coach {{{Head Coach}}} Legend: * Suspended list; (C) Captain; (A) Alternate captain; Roster updated 2010-10-27; NLL Transactions

== See also ==
- 2010 NLL season
