= 2010 Washington Stealth season =

2010 Washington Stealth
- Champion's Cup Champions
- West Division Champions
- League: NLL
- Division: 1st West
- 2010 record: 11-5
- Home record: 6-2
- Road record: 5-3
- Goals for: 211
- Goals against: 179
- General Manager: Johnny Mouradian
- Coach: Jeff Dowling; Chris Hall
- Captain: Jason Bloom
- Alternate captains: Jeff Zywicki
- Arena: Comcast Arena at Everett

Team leaders
- Goals: Lewis Ratcliff
- Assists: Rhys Duch
- Points: Lewis Ratcliff
- Penalties in minutes: Matt Beers
- Loose Balls: Eric Martin
- Wins: Tyler Richards
- Goals against average: Tyler Richards

The Washington Stealth are a lacrosse team based in Everett, Washington. The team plays in the National Lacrosse League (NLL). The 2010 season was the inaugural season in Washington, but the 11th in franchise history (previously the San Jose Stealth and Albany Attack). The Stealth finished first overall, and captured the first NLL Championship in franchise history.

== Regular season ==
=== Conference standings ===
East Division
P	Team	GP	W	L	PCT	GB	Home	Road	GF	GA	Diff	GF/GP	GA/GP
1	Orlando Titans – xy	16	11	5	.688	0.0	5–3	6–2	172	154	+18	10.75	9.62
2	Toronto Rock – x	16	9	7	.562	2.0	6–2	3–5	197	156	+41	12.31	9.75
3	Buffalo Bandits – x	16	8	8	.500	3.0	4–4	4–4	169	170	−1	10.56	10.62
4	Boston Blazers – x	16	8	8	.500	3.0	5–3	3–5	161	162	−1	10.06	10.12
5	Rochester Knighthawks	16	7	9	.438	4.0	4–4	3–5	155	181	−26	9.69	11.31
6	Philadelphia Wings	16	5	11	.312	6.0	3–5	2–6	168	194	−26	10.50	12.12

West Division
P	Team	GP	W	L	PCT	GB	Home	Road	GF	GA	Diff	GF/GP	GA/GP
1	Washington Stealth – xyz	16	11	5	.688	0.0	6–2	5–3	211	179	+32	13.19	11.19
2	Calgary Roughnecks – x	16	10	6	.625	1.0	5–3	5–3	193	169	+24	12.06	10.56
3	Edmonton Rush – x	16	10	6	.625	1.0	5–3	5–3	186	201	−15	11.62	12.56
4	Minnesota Swarm – x	16	5	11	.312	6.0	3–5	2–6	189	201	−12	11.81	12.56
5	Colorado Mammoth	16	4	12	.250	7.0	0–8	4–4	167	201	−34	10.44	12.56

x: Clinched playoff berth; c: Clinched playoff berth by crossing over to another division; y: Clinched division; z: Clinched best regular season record; GP: Games Played
W: Wins; L: Losses; GB: Games back; PCT: Win percentage; Home: Record at Home; Road: Record on the Road; GF: Goals scored; GA: Goals allowed
Differential: Difference between goals scored and allowed; GF/GP: Average number of goals scored per game; GA/GP: Average number of goals allowed per game

=== Game log ===
Game	Date	Opponent	Location	Score	OT	Attendance	Record
1	January 8, 2010	Colorado Mammoth	Comcast Arena at Everett	W 17–8		4,737	1–0
2	January 15, 2010	Edmonton Rush	Comcast Arena at Everett	W 15–7		2,818	2–0
3	January 22, 2010	Buffalo Bandits	Comcast Arena at Everett	W 13–11		2,879	3–0
4	January 23, 2010	@ Calgary Roughnecks	Pengrowth Saddledome	W 16–15		10,104	4–0
5	January 30, 2010	@ Colorado Mammoth	Pepsi Center	W 12–11		15,242	5–0
6	February 5, 2010	Minnesota Swarm	Comcast Arena at Everett	W 12–9		3,526	6–0
7	February 13, 2010	@ Minnesota Swarm	Xcel Energy Center	L 12–16		8,952	6–1
8	February 19, 2010	Calgary Roughnecks	Comcast Arena at Everett	L 9–13		3,450	6–2
9	February 27, 2010	@ Boston Blazers	TD Banknorth Garden	L 9–11		8,354	6–3
10	March 13, 2010	@ Calgary Roughnecks	Pengrowth Saddledome	W 12–11		10,402	7–3
11	March 26, 2010	@ Colorado Mammoth	Pepsi Center	W 15–14		15,102	8–3
12	March 27, 2010	Colorado Mammoth	Comcast Arena at Everett	W 12–9		5,808	9–3
13	April 2, 2010	@ Edmonton Rush	Rexall Place	L 13–14	OT	7,011	9–4
14	April 10, 2010	@ Orlando Titans	Amway Arena	W 17–7		7,101	10–4
15	April 17, 2010	Edmonton Rush	Comcast Arena at Everett	L 13–14		4,441	10–5
16	April 24, 2010	Rochester Knighthawks	Comcast Arena at Everett	W 14–9		4,200	11–5

== Playoffs ==
=== Game log ===
Game	Date	Opponent	Location	Score	OT	Attendance	Record
Division Semifinal	May 1, 2010	Minnesota Swarm	Comcast Arena (Division Final @ Key Arena)	W 14–10		3,268	1–0
Division Final	May 8, 2010	Edmonton Rush	Comcast Arena (Division Final @ Key Arena)	W 12–11	OT	4,242	2–0
Championship Game	May 15, 2010	Toronto Rock	Comcast Arena (Division Final @ Key Arena)	W 15–11		8,609	3–0

== Transactions ==
=== New players ===
- Jason Bloom - acquired in trade
- Tyler Codron - acquired in trade
- Lewis Ratcliff - acquired in trade
- Luke Wiles - acquired in trade

=== Players not returning ===
- Aaron Bold - traded
- Colin Doyle - traded
- Mike Kirk - traded
- Frank Resetarits - traded

=== Trades ===
December 15, 2009	To Washington Stealth Lewis Ratcliff; Joel Dalgarno; Tyler Codron	To Toronto Rock Colin Doyle; Conditional Second round pick, 2010 entry draft
September 3, 2009	To Washington Stealth Two first round picks, 2009 entry draft	To Minnesota Swarm Alex Turner; Aaron Bold
September 3, 2009	To Washington Stealth Second round pick, 2009 entry draft	To Buffalo Bandits Frank Resetarits
August 10, 2009	To Washington Stealth Jamieson Koesterer; Fifth round pick, 2009 entry draft	To Buffalo Bandits Second round pick, 2009 entry draft
July 7, 2009	To Washington Stealth Luke Wiles	To Toronto Rock Kevin Huntley; Second round pick, 2011 entry draft
July 7, 2009	To Washington Stealth Mike Kirk	To Boston Blazers Jason Bloom

=== Entry draft ===
The 2009 NLL Entry Draft took place on September 9, 2009. The Stealth selected the following players:

Round	Overall	Player	College/Club
2	13	Matt Beers	Coquitlam, BC
2	23	Erik Sage	Victoria, BC
3	24	Ben Hunt	University of North Carolina
3	29	Rhys Jones	Victoria, BC
3	30	Ray Hodgkinson	Burnaby, BC
5	49	Chris Taylor	Georgetown University
6	58	Chris O'Dougherty	Rutgers University

== Roster ==
2010 Washington Stealth roster
Active (21-man) roster		Inactive roster	Coaches
Goaltenders: 00 (Canada) Tyler Richards; 33 (Canada) Matt Roik; Defensemen: 2 (Canada) Matt Beers; 22 (Canada) Wade DeWolff; 23 (Canada) Mike Grimes; 6 (Canada) Curtis Hodgson; 13 (United States) Brett Manney; 25 (United States) Eric Martin; 11 (Canada) Kyle Sorensen	Forwards: 16 (Canada) Joel Dalgarno; 10 (Canada) Rhys Duch; 8 (Canada) Tom Johnson; 19 (Canada) Kory Kowalyk; 42 (Canada) Lewis Ratcliff; 29 (Canada) Cam Sedgwick; 22 (Canada) Alex Turner; 15 (Canada) Luke Wiles; 67 (Canada) Jeff Zywicki (A); Transition: 47 (Canada) Jason Bloom (C); 18 (United States) Kyle Hartzell; 12 (United States) Ben Hunt; 39 (United States) Jamison Koesterer; 4 (Canada) Peter Morgan; 9 (United States) Paul Rabil	Practice squad: 30 (Canada) Matt Findell; 3 (Canada) Rhys Jones; 24 (United States) Chris O'Dougherty; Injured reserve: 44 (Canada) Travis Gillespie; Unable to play: 77 (Canada) Tyler Codron; 17 (Canada) Steve McKinlay	Head coach {{{Head Coach}}} Legend: * Suspended list; (C) Captain; (A) Alternate captain; updated 2010-01-29; NLL Transactions

== See also ==
- 2010 NLL season
