= 2010 Edmonton Rush season =

2010 Edmonton Rush
- League: NLL
- Division: 3rd West
- 2010 record: 10-6
- Home record: 5-3
- Road record: 5-3
- Goals for: 186
- Goals against: 201
- General Manager: Derek Keenan
- Coach: Derek Keenan
- Captain: Chris McElroy
- Alternate captains: Jimmy Quinlan; Rory Glaves
- Arena: Rexall Place
- Average attendance: 7,558

Team leaders
- Goals: Ryan Ward (31)
- Assists: Ryan Ward (43)
- Points: Ryan Ward 74
- Penalties in minutes: Ian Crashley (50)
- Loose Balls: Brodie Merrill (190)
- Wins: Matt Disher (8)
- Goals against average: Brandon Atherton (9.82)

The Edmonton Rush are a lacrosse team based in Edmonton playing in the National Lacrosse League (NLL). The 2010 season will be the 5th in franchise history.

== Regular season ==
=== Conference standings ===
East Division
P	Team	GP	W	L	PCT	GB	Home	Road	GF	GA	Diff	GF/GP	GA/GP
1	Orlando Titans – xy	16	11	5	.688	0.0	5–3	6–2	172	154	+18	10.75	9.62
2	Toronto Rock – x	16	9	7	.562	2.0	6–2	3–5	197	156	+41	12.31	9.75
3	Buffalo Bandits – x	16	8	8	.500	3.0	4–4	4–4	169	170	−1	10.56	10.62
4	Boston Blazers – x	16	8	8	.500	3.0	5–3	3–5	161	162	−1	10.06	10.12
5	Rochester Knighthawks	16	7	9	.438	4.0	4–4	3–5	155	181	−26	9.69	11.31
6	Philadelphia Wings	16	5	11	.312	6.0	3–5	2–6	168	194	−26	10.50	12.12

West Division
P	Team	GP	W	L	PCT	GB	Home	Road	GF	GA	Diff	GF/GP	GA/GP
1	Washington Stealth – xyz	16	11	5	.688	0.0	6–2	5–3	211	179	+32	13.19	11.19
2	Calgary Roughnecks – x	16	10	6	.625	1.0	5–3	5–3	193	169	+24	12.06	10.56
3	Edmonton Rush – x	16	10	6	.625	1.0	5–3	5–3	186	201	−15	11.62	12.56
4	Minnesota Swarm – x	16	5	11	.312	6.0	3–5	2–6	189	201	−12	11.81	12.56
5	Colorado Mammoth	16	4	12	.250	7.0	0–8	4–4	167	201	−34	10.44	12.56

x: Clinched playoff berth; c: Clinched playoff berth by crossing over to another division; y: Clinched division; z: Clinched best regular season record; GP: Games Played
W: Wins; L: Losses; GB: Games back; PCT: Win percentage; Home: Record at Home; Road: Record on the Road; GF: Goals scored; GA: Goals allowed
Differential: Difference between goals scored and allowed; GF/GP: Average number of goals scored per game; GA/GP: Average number of goals allowed per game

=== Game log ===
Game	Date	Opponent	Location	Score	OT	Attendance	Record
1	January 15, 2010	@ Washington Stealth	Comcast Arena at Everett	L 7–15		2,818	0–1
2	January 16, 2010	@ Colorado Mammoth	Pepsi Center	W 14–13		15,178	1–1
3	January 23, 2010	Buffalo Bandits	Rexall Place	W 11–7		7,102	2–1
4	January 30, 2010	Calgary Roughnecks	Rexall Place	W 14–11		7,815	3–1
5	February 5, 2010	@ Calgary Roughnecks	Pengrowth Saddledome	L 8–13		10,724	3–2
6	February 12, 2010	@ Toronto Rock	Air Canada Centre	L 7–16		10,052	3–3
7	February 21, 2010	Toronto Rock	Rexall Place	W 14–13		7,387	4–3
8	February 27, 2010	@ Rochester Knighthawks	Blue Cross Arena	W 12–11	OT	5,229	5–3
9	March 13, 2010	@ Colorado Mammoth	Pepsi Center	W 13–9		14,556	6–3
10	March 20, 2010	Boston Blazers	Rexall Place	L 5–12		8,034	6–4
11	March 27, 2010	Minnesota Swarm	Rexall Place	W 16–14		6,200	7–4
12	April 2, 2010	Washington Stealth	Rexall Place	W 14–13	OT	7,011	8–4
13	April 3, 2010	@ Minnesota Swarm	Xcel Energy Center	W 13–12	OT	8,935	9–4
14	April 9, 2010	Colorado Mammoth	Rexall Place	L 10–14		7,493	9–5
15	April 16, 2010	Calgary Roughnecks	Rexall Place	L 14–15	OT	9,423	9–6
16	April 17, 2010	@ Washington Stealth	Comcast Arena at Everett	W 14–13		4,141	10–6

== Playoffs ==
=== Game log ===
Game	Date	Opponent	Location	Score	OT	Attendance	Record
Division Semifinal	May 1, 2010	@ Calgary Roughnecks	Pengrowth Saddledome	W 11–7		10,388	1–0
Division Final	May 8, 2010	@ Washington Stealth	Comcast Arena at Everett	L 11–12	OT	4,242	1–1

== Transactions ==
=== New players ===
- Matt Disher - signed as free agent
- Derek Malawsky - acquired in trade
- Brodie Merrill - Portland dispersal draft
- Justin Norbraten - acquired in trade
- Mark Scherman - acquired in trade
- Scott Stewart - acquired in trade
- Ryan Ward - acquired in trade

=== Players not returning ===
- Ryan Benesch - traded
- Dave Cutten - traded
- Scott Self - traded
- Dan Teat - traded
- Spencer Martin - released

=== Trades ===
July 7, 2009	To Edmonton Rush Ryan Ward (F); Justin Norbraten (F); Scott Stewart (F); Richard Morgan (D)	To Minnesota Swarm Ryan Benesch (F); Scott Self (D); *1st round pick in 2009 Entry Draft - Corey Small (F)
July 10, 2009	To Edmonton Rush Mark Scherman (F)	To Toronto Rock Dave Cutten (T)
July 21, 2009	To Edmonton Rush 3rd round pick in 2009 Entry Draft - Brett Mydske (D)	To Toronto Rock Mike Hominuck (F)
July 29, 2009	To Edmonton Rush Derek Malawsky (F)	To Philadelphia Wings Dan Teat (F)
September 3, 2009	To Edmonton Rush 1st round pick in 2009 Entry Draft - Corey Small (F)	To Minnesota Swarm Richard Morgan (D)
November 10, 2009	To Edmonton Rush Gavin Prout (F); Dean Hill (F)	To Rochester Knighthawks 1st round pick in 2011 Entry Draft - Stephen Keogh (F); 2nd round pick in 2011 Entry Draft - Joel White (T)
December 1, 2009	To Edmonton Rush Ryan Powell (F)	To Colorado Mammoth Callum Crawford (F)

*Later traded back to the Edmonton Rush

=== Entry draft ===
The 2009 NLL Entry Draft took place on September 9, 2009. The Rush selected the following players:

^{#} Denotes player who never played in the NLL regular season or playoffs

Round	Overall	Player	College/Club
1	9	Corey Small (F)	University at Albany, SUNY
1	12	Scott Tinning (F)	Brampton, Ontario
2	14	Dane Stevens (F)	Brampton, Ontario
3	25	Brett Mydske (D)	New Westminster, British Columbia
5	42	Geoff McNulty (F)	St. Catharines, Ontario
5	48	Shane Lopatynski^{#} (D)	Edmonton, Alberta
6	52	Craig Zeeh^{#} (D)	Kitchener, Ontario

== Roster ==
2010 Edmonton Rush roster
Active (21-man) roster		Inactive roster	Coaches
Goaltenders: 00 (Canada) Brandon Atherton; 1 (Canada) Matt Disher; Defensemen: 49 (Canada) Bruce Alexander; 5 (Canada) Ian Crashley; 43 (Canada) Rory Glaves; 88 (Canada) Ian Hawksbee; 12 (Canada) Pat Jones; 6 (Canada) John Lintz; 11 (Canada) Ryan McNish; 2 (Canada) Brett Mydske; 7 (Canada) Derek Suddons	Forwards: 73 (Canada) Dean Hill; 22 (United States) Ryan Powell; 9 (Canada) Gavin Prout; 81 (Canada) Jimmy Quinlan (A); 21 (Canada) Andy Secore; 45 (Canada) Corey Small; 20 (Canada) Dane Stevens; 4 (Canada) Scott Tinning; 44 (Canada) Ryan Ward; Transition: 15 (Canada) Chris McElroy (C); 17 (Canada) Brodie Merrill (A); 8 (Canada) Scott Stewart	Practice squad: 72 (Canada) Jordan Cornfield; 36 (Canada) Luke Forget; 33 (Canada) Trevor Van Bavel; Injured reserve: 29 (Canada) Buck Stobart; Holdout: -- (Canada) Curt Morwick; -- (Canada) Lindsay Plunkett; Restricted list: 26 (Canada) Andrew Turner; -- (Canada) Ben Prepchuk	Head coach {{{Head Coach}}} Legend: * Suspended list; (C) Captain; (A) Alternate captain; Roster updated 2010-01-17; NLL Transactions

== See also ==
- 2010 NLL season
