= 2010 Toronto Rock season =

2010 Toronto Rock
- East Division Champions
- League: NLL
- Division: 2nd East
- 2010 record: 9–7
- Home record: 6–2
- Road record: 3–5
- Goals for: 197
- Goals against: 156
- General Manager: Terry Sanderson
- Coach: Troy Cordingley
- Captain: Colin Doyle
- Alternate captains: Sandy Chapman; Phil Sanderson; Pat McCready; Blaine Manning
- Arena: Air Canada Centre
- Average attendance: 10,067

Team leaders
- Goals: Stephan Leblanc (36)
- Assists: Colin Doyle (62)
- Points: Colin Doyle (84)
- Penalties in minutes: Drew Petkoff (30)
- Loose Balls: Sandy Chapman (86)
- Wins: Bob Watson (7)
- Goals against average: Bob Watson (9.31)

The Toronto Rock are a lacrosse team based in Toronto playing in the National Lacrosse League (NLL). The 2010 season was the 14th in franchise history, and 13th as the Rock.

Shortly after the 2009 season ended, the Rock franchise was sold to Jamie Dawick, a professional poker player and businessman from nearby Oakville, Ontario. Dawick's first move was to bring Terry Sanderson back on board as general manager. Sanderson soon hired former Calgary Roughnecks head coach Troy Cordingley to coach the Rock and the Rock's fortunes changed immediately.

They finished the 2010 season with a 9–7 record, their best record since their Championship win in 2005 and made the playoffs for the first time in three years. They defeated the Buffalo Bandits and Orlando Titans to get to the Championship game for the seventh time in team history but were defeated by the Washington Stealth.

== Regular season ==
=== Conference standings ===
East Division
P	Team	GP	W	L	PCT	GB	Home	Road	GF	GA	Diff	GF/GP	GA/GP
1	Orlando Titans – xy	16	11	5	.688	0.0	5–3	6–2	172	154	+18	10.75	9.62
2	Toronto Rock – x	16	9	7	.562	2.0	6–2	3–5	197	156	+41	12.31	9.75
3	Buffalo Bandits – x	16	8	8	.500	3.0	4–4	4–4	169	170	−1	10.56	10.62
4	Boston Blazers – x	16	8	8	.500	3.0	5–3	3–5	161	162	−1	10.06	10.12
5	Rochester Knighthawks	16	7	9	.438	4.0	4–4	3–5	155	181	−26	9.69	11.31
6	Philadelphia Wings	16	5	11	.312	6.0	3–5	2–6	168	194	−26	10.50	12.12

West Division
P	Team	GP	W	L	PCT	GB	Home	Road	GF	GA	Diff	GF/GP	GA/GP
1	Washington Stealth – xyz	16	11	5	.688	0.0	6–2	5–3	211	179	+32	13.19	11.19
2	Calgary Roughnecks – x	16	10	6	.625	1.0	5–3	5–3	193	169	+24	12.06	10.56
3	Edmonton Rush – x	16	10	6	.625	1.0	5–3	5–3	186	201	−15	11.62	12.56
4	Minnesota Swarm – x	16	5	11	.312	6.0	3–5	2–6	189	201	−12	11.81	12.56
5	Colorado Mammoth	16	4	12	.250	7.0	0–8	4–4	167	201	−34	10.44	12.56

x: Clinched playoff berth; c: Clinched playoff berth by crossing over to another division; y: Clinched division; z: Clinched best regular season record; GP: Games Played
W: Wins; L: Losses; GB: Games back; PCT: Win percentage; Home: Record at Home; Road: Record on the Road; GF: Goals scored; GA: Goals allowed
Differential: Difference between goals scored and allowed; GF/GP: Average number of goals scored per game; GA/GP: Average number of goals allowed per game

=== Game log ===
Game	Date	Opponent	Location	Score	OT	Attendance	Record
1	January 9, 2010	@ Boston Blazers	TD Garden	W 17–7		8,215	1–0
2	January 15, 2010	Boston Blazers	Air Canada Centre	W 8–7	OT	11,502	2–0
3	January 23, 2010	Rochester Knighthawks	Air Canada Centre	W 17–3		10,104	3–0
4	January 30, 2010	@ Rochester Knighthawks	Blue Cross Arena	L 8–16		6,676	3–1
5	February 5, 2010	Philadelphia Wings	Air Canada Centre	W 19–11		10,256	4–1
6	February 6, 2010	@ Buffalo Bandits	HSBC Arena	W 14–10		14,467	5–1
7	February 12, 2010	Edmonton Rush	Air Canada Centre	W 16–7		10,052	6–1
8	January 14, 2010	@ Calgary Roughnecks	Pengrowth Saddledome	L 8–10		10,193	6–2
9	February 21, 2010	@ Edmonton Rush	Rexall Place	L 13–14		7,387	6–3
10	February 27, 2010	Orlando Titans	Air Canada Centre	L 12–16		10,984	6–4
11	March 12, 2010	Buffalo Bandits	Air Canada Centre	L 10–11	OT	8,567	6–5
12	March 27, 2010	@ Orlando Titans	Amway Arena	L 8–10		5,691	6–6
13	April 2, 2010	Calgary Roughnecks	Air Canada Centre	W 9–8		9,108	7–6
14	April 3, 2010	@ Philadelphia Wings	Wachovia Center	W 13–6		10,246	8–6
15	April 10, 2010	@ Buffalo Bandits	HSBC Arena	L 10–13		18,575	8–7
16	April 16, 2010	Rochester Knighthawks	Air Canada Centre	W 15–7		9,959	9–7

== Playoffs ==
=== Game log ===
Game	Date	Opponent	Location	Score	OT	Attendance	Record
Division Semifinal	May 1, 2010	Buffalo Bandits	Air Canada Centre	W 13–11		9,367	1–0
Division Final	May 8, 2010	@ Orlando Titans	Amway Arena	W 15–10		4,651	2–0
Championship Game	May 15, 2010	@ Washington Stealth	Comcast Arena	L 11–15		8,609	2–1

== Transactions ==
=== New players ===
- Sandy Chapman - acquired in trade
- Colin Doyle - acquired in trade
- Mike Hominuck - acquired in trade
- Pat McCready - acquired in trade
- Phil Sanderson - acquired in trade
- Kim Squire - signed as a free agent

=== Players not returning ===
- Jason Clark - released
- Craig Conn - traded
- Jason Crosbie - released
- Chris Driscoll - traded
- Bill McGlone - traded
- Lewis Ratcliff - traded
- Mark Scherman - traded
- Chad Thompson - released
- Luke Wiles - traded

=== Trades ===
December 22, 2009	To Toronto Rock Sixth round pick, 2010 entry draft	To Boston Blazers Dave Cutten
December 15, 2009	To Toronto Rock Colin Doyle; Conditional Second round pick, 2010 entry draft	To Washington Stealth Lewis Ratcliff; Joel Dalgarno; Tyler Codron
September 3, 2009	To Toronto Rock First round pick, 2009 entry draft Sixth round pick, 2010 entry draft	To Calgary Roughnecks Craig Conn; Second round pick, 2010 entry draft
August 4, 2009	To Toronto Rock Pat McCready; Third round pick, 2009 entry draft	To Buffalo Bandits Second round pick, 2009 entry draft First round pick, 2010 entry draft Second round pick, 2011 entry draft
July 27, 2009	To Toronto Rock Mike Hominuck	To Edmonton Rush Third round pick, 2009 entry draft
July 21, 2009	To Toronto Rock Phil Sanderson	To Buffalo Bandits Chris Driscoll
July 7, 2009	To Toronto Rock Sandy Chapman	To Rochester Knighthawks Peter Jacobs
July 7, 2009	To Toronto Rock Peter Jacobs; First round pick, 2011 entry draft	To Philadelphia Wings Kevin Huntley; Bill McGlone
July 7, 2009	To Toronto Rock Kevin Huntley; First round pick, 2011 entry draft	To Washington Stealth Luke Wiles

=== Entry draft ===
The 2009 NLL Entry Draft took place on September 9, 2009. The Rock selected the following players:

Round	Overall	Player	College/Club
1	6	Garrett Billings	University of Virginia
1	7	Joel Dalgarno	Ohio State University
1	11	Stephen Leblanc	Queens University
3	31	Damon Edwards	Orangeville, ON
5	43	Anthony Lackey	Orangeville, ON
6	53	John Quarrie	Orangeville, ON

== Roster ==
2010 Toronto Rock roster
Active (21-man) roster		Inactive roster	Coaches
Goaltenders: 30 (Canada) Steve Dietrich; 29 (Canada) Bob Watson; Defensemen: 37 (Canada) Scott Campbell; 5 (Canada) Sandy Chapman (A); 9 (Canada) Brendon Doran; 4 (Canada) Jeff Gilbert; 44 (Canada) Stephen Hoar; 11 (Canada) Mike Hobbins; 12 (Canada) Anthony Lackey; 14 (Canada) Rob Marshall; 10 (Canada) Pat McCready (A); 56 (Canada) Drew Petkoff; 8 (Canada) Creighton Reid; 18 (Canada) Phil Sanderson (A); 22 (Canada) Cam Woods	Forwards: 33 (Canada) Kasey Beirnes; 13 (Canada) Garrett Billings; 7 (Canada) Colin Doyle (C); 90 (Canada) Mike Hominuck; 17 (Canada) Stephan Leblanc; 16 (Canada) Blaine Manning (A); 93 (Canada) Kim Squire; 23 (Canada) Josh Wasson	Practice squad: 1 (Canada) Phil Wetherup; 2 (Canada) Pat Saunders; 47 (Canada) Geoff McNulty	Head coach {{{Head Coach}}} Legend: * Suspended list; (C) Captain; (A) Alternate captain; Roster updated 2010-03-06; NLL Transactions

== See also ==
- 2010 NLL season
