= 2010 Boston Blazers season =

2010 Boston Blazers
- League: NLL
- Division: 4th East
- 2010 record: 8-8
- Home record: 5-3
- Road record: 3-5
- Goals for: 161
- Goals against: 162
- General Manager: Doug Reffue
- Coach: Tom Ryan
- Arena: TD Banknorth Garden
- Average attendance: 8,310

Team leaders
- Goals: Dan Dawson (36)
- Assists: Dan Dawson (52)
- Points: Dan Dawson (88)
- Penalties in minutes: Paul Dawson (65)
- Loose Balls: Greg Downing (101); Ryan Hotaling (101); Mitch Belisle (101)
- Wins: Anthony Cosmo (7)
- Goals against average: Anthony Cosmo (9.50)

The Boston Blazers are a lacrosse team based in Boston playing in the National Lacrosse League (NLL). The 2010 season was their second season in the NLL.

== Standings ==
East Division
P	Team	GP	W	L	PCT	GB	Home	Road	GF	GA	Diff	GF/GP	GA/GP
1	Orlando Titans – xy	16	11	5	.688	0.0	5–3	6–2	172	154	+18	10.75	9.62
2	Toronto Rock – x	16	9	7	.562	2.0	6–2	3–5	197	156	+41	12.31	9.75
3	Buffalo Bandits – x	16	8	8	.500	3.0	4–4	4–4	169	170	−1	10.56	10.62
4	Boston Blazers – x	16	8	8	.500	3.0	5–3	3–5	161	162	−1	10.06	10.12
5	Rochester Knighthawks	16	7	9	.438	4.0	4–4	3–5	155	181	−26	9.69	11.31
6	Philadelphia Wings	16	5	11	.312	6.0	3–5	2–6	168	194	−26	10.50	12.12

West Division
P	Team	GP	W	L	PCT	GB	Home	Road	GF	GA	Diff	GF/GP	GA/GP
1	Washington Stealth – xyz	16	11	5	.688	0.0	6–2	5–3	211	179	+32	13.19	11.19
2	Calgary Roughnecks – x	16	10	6	.625	1.0	5–3	5–3	193	169	+24	12.06	10.56
3	Edmonton Rush – x	16	10	6	.625	1.0	5–3	5–3	186	201	−15	11.62	12.56
4	Minnesota Swarm – x	16	5	11	.312	6.0	3–5	2–6	189	201	−12	11.81	12.56
5	Colorado Mammoth	16	4	12	.250	7.0	0–8	4–4	167	201	−34	10.44	12.56

x: Clinched playoff berth; c: Clinched playoff berth by crossing over to another division; y: Clinched division; z: Clinched best regular season record; GP: Games Played
W: Wins; L: Losses; GB: Games back; PCT: Win percentage; Home: Record at Home; Road: Record on the Road; GF: Goals scored; GA: Goals allowed
Differential: Difference between goals scored and allowed; GF/GP: Average number of goals scored per game; GA/GP: Average number of goals allowed per game

== Game log ==
Game	Date	Opponent	Location	Score	OT	Attendance	Record
1	January 9, 2010	Toronto Rock	TD Banknorth Garden	L 7–17		8,215	0–1
2	January 15, 2010	@ Toronto Rock	Air Canada Centre	L 7–8	OT	11,502	0–2
3	January 16, 2010	@ Philadelphia Wings	Wachovia Center	L 8–12		9,330	0–3
4	January 23, 2010	Orlando Titans	TD Banknorth Garden	W 13–9		7,812	1–3
5	January 30, 2010	Philadelphia Wings	TD Banknorth Garden	W 11–9		7,289	2–3
6	February 6, 2010	Rochester Knighthawks	TD Banknorth Garden	W 14–8		7,546	3–3
7	February 13, 2010	@ Rochester Knighthawks	Blue Cross Arena	L 9–11		6,066	3–4
8	February 20, 2010	@ Orlando Titans	Amway Arena	W 12–11	OT	8,442	4–4
9	February 27, 2010	Washington Stealth	TD Banknorth Garden	W 11–9		8,354	5–4
10	March 13, 2010	Buffalo Bandits	TD Banknorth Garden	L 8–9	OT	9,062	5–5
11	March 20, 2010	@ Edmonton Rush	Rexall Place	W 12–5		8,034	6–5
12	March 27, 2010	@ Philadelphia Wings	Wachovia Center	L 7–13		11,241	6–6
13	April 3, 2010	Orlando Titans	TD Banknorth Garden	L 10–13		8,168	6–7
14	April 10, 2010	Minnesota Swarm	TD Banknorth Garden	W 13–8		10,032	7–7
15	April 16, 2010	@ Colorado Mammoth	Pepsi Center	W 9–7		15,104	8–7
16	April 24, 2010	@ Buffalo Bandits	HSBC Arena	L 10–13		18,480	8–8

== Playoffs ==
=== Game log ===
Game	Date	Opponent	Location	Score	OT	Attendance	Record
Division Semifinal	May 1, 2010	@ Orlando Titans	Amway Arena	L 11–12		4,205	0–1

== Transactions ==
=== Trades ===
August 13, 2009	To Boston Blazers Second round pick, 2011 entry draft	To Minnesota Swarm Jay Thorimbert
July 7, 2009	To Boston Blazers Mike Kirk	To Washington Stealth Jason Bloom

=== Entry draft ===
The 2009 NLL Entry Draft took place on September 9, 2009. The Blazers selected the following players:

Round	Overall	Player	College/Club
1	8	Max Seibald	Cornell University
2	20	Matt Abbott	Syracuse University
3	33	Scott Kahoe	Syracuse University
4	38	Matt Messina	NYIT
6	59	Mike Stone	Middlebury College

== Roster ==
2010 Boston Blazers roster
Active (21-man) roster		Inactive roster	Coaches
Goaltenders: 44 (Canada) Anthony Cosmo; 30 (Canada) Mike Poulin; Defensemen: 85 (United States) Mitch Belisle; 2 (Canada) Paul Dawson; 12 (Canada) Jon Durno; 28 (Canada) Dilan Graham; 33 (Canada) Jon Harnett; 4 (Canada) Carter Livingstone; 15 (Canada) Curtis Ptolemy; 18 (United States) Jack Reid	Forwards: 22 (Canada) Bryan Bendig; 9 (Canada) Gary Bining; 6 (Canada) Dan Dawson; 8 (United States) Greg Downing; 19 (Canada) Matt Lyons; 25 (United States) Sean Morris; 23 (United States) Brett Queener; 97 (Canada) Kyle Ross; 10 (Canada) Brenden Thenhaus; 75 (Canada) Jay Thorimbert; 16 (Canada) Daryl Veltman; Transition: 47 (Canada) Jason Bloom; 37 (Canada) Nick Cotter	Practice squad: 20 Travis Brown; 05 Paul Manesis; 66 (Canada) Nick Rose	Head coach {{{Head Coach}}} Legend: * Suspended list; (C) Captain; (A) Alternate captain; Roster updated 2009-02-04; NLL Transactions

== See also ==
- 2010 NLL season
