= 2010 Rochester Knighthawks season =

2010 Rochester Knighthawks
- League: NLL
- Division: 5th East
- 2010 record: 7-9
- Home record: 4-4
- Road record: 3-5
- Goals for: 155
- Goals against: 181
- General Manager: Curt Styres
- Coach: Paul Gait
- Captain: Shawn Williams
- Arena: Blue Cross Arena

Team leaders
- Goals: John Grant, Jr. (49)
- Assists: Shawn Williams (46)
- Points: John Grant, Jr. (83)
- Penalties in minutes: Scott Evans (79)
- Loose Balls: Steve Toll (153)
- Wins: Pat O'Toole (5)
- Goals against average: Aaron Bold (11.12)

The Rochester Knighthawks were a lacrosse team based in Rochester, New York, that played in the National Lacrosse League (NLL). The 2010 season was the 16th in franchise history.

== Regular season ==
=== Conference standings ===
East Division
P	Team	GP	W	L	PCT	GB	Home	Road	GF	GA	Diff	GF/GP	GA/GP
1	Orlando Titans – xy	16	11	5	.688	0.0	5–3	6–2	172	154	+18	10.75	9.62
2	Toronto Rock – x	16	9	7	.562	2.0	6–2	3–5	197	156	+41	12.31	9.75
3	Buffalo Bandits – x	16	8	8	.500	3.0	4–4	4–4	169	170	−1	10.56	10.62
4	Boston Blazers – x	16	8	8	.500	3.0	5–3	3–5	161	162	−1	10.06	10.12
5	Rochester Knighthawks	16	7	9	.438	4.0	4–4	3–5	155	181	−26	9.69	11.31
6	Philadelphia Wings	16	5	11	.312	6.0	3–5	2–6	168	194	−26	10.50	12.12

West Division
P	Team	GP	W	L	PCT	GB	Home	Road	GF	GA	Diff	GF/GP	GA/GP
1	Washington Stealth – xyz	16	11	5	.688	0.0	6–2	5–3	211	179	+32	13.19	11.19
2	Calgary Roughnecks – x	16	10	6	.625	1.0	5–3	5–3	193	169	+24	12.06	10.56
3	Edmonton Rush – x	16	10	6	.625	1.0	5–3	5–3	186	201	−15	11.62	12.56
4	Minnesota Swarm – x	16	5	11	.312	6.0	3–5	2–6	189	201	−12	11.81	12.56
5	Colorado Mammoth	16	4	12	.250	7.0	0–8	4–4	167	201	−34	10.44	12.56

x: Clinched playoff berth; c: Clinched playoff berth by crossing over to another division; y: Clinched division; z: Clinched best regular season record; GP: Games Played
W: Wins; L: Losses; GB: Games back; PCT: Win percentage; Home: Record at Home; Road: Record on the Road; GF: Goals scored; GA: Goals allowed
Differential: Difference between goals scored and allowed; GF/GP: Average number of goals scored per game; GA/GP: Average number of goals allowed per game

=== Game log ===
Game	Date	Opponent	Location	Score	OT	Attendance	Record
1	January 8, 2010	Buffalo Bandits	Blue Cross Arena	W 10–5		8,192	1–0
2	January 16, 2010	@ Buffalo Bandits	HSBC Arena	W 13–11		17,207	2–0
3	January 23, 2010	@ Toronto Rock	Air Canada Centre	L 3–17		10,104	2–1
4	January 29, 2010	@ Orlando Titans	Amway Arena	L 8–13		7,367	2–2
5	January 30, 2010	Toronto Rock	Blue Cross Arena	W 16–8		6,676	3–2
6	February 6, 2010	@ Boston Blazers	TD Banknorth Garden	L 8–14		7,546	3–3
7	February 13, 2010	Boston Blazers	Blue Cross Arena	W 11–9		6,066	4–3
8	February 20, 2010	@ Philadelphia Wings	Wachovia Center	W 12–6		10,019	5–3
9	February 27, 2010	Edmonton Rush	Blue Cross Arena	L 11–12	OT	5,229	5–4
10	March 13, 2010	Orlando Titans	Blue Cross Arena	L 4–9		5,930	5–5
11	March 27, 2010	Buffalo Bandits	Blue Cross Arena	L 7–14		10,652	5–6
12	April 3, 2010	Calgary Roughnecks	Blue Cross Arena	L 9–11		7,206	5–7
13	April 9, 2010	@ Minnesota Swarm	Xcel Energy Center	W 12–11		9,193	6–7
14	April 10, 2010	Philadelphia Wings	Blue Cross Arena	W 15–12		7,086	7–7
15	April 16, 2010	@ Toronto Rock	Air Canada Centre	L 7–15		9,959	7–8
16	April 24, 2010	@ Washington Stealth	Comcast Arena at Everett	L 9–14		4,200	7–9

== Transactions ==
=== New players ===
- Aaron Bold - acquired in trade
- John Grant, Jr. - returning from injury
- Peter Jacobs - acquired in trade
- Cody Johnson - acquired in trade
- Ian Rubel - acquired in trade
- Regy Thorpe - resigned as General Manager to resume playing

=== Players not returning ===
- Sandy Chapman - traded

=== Trades ===
July 7, 2009	To Rochester Knighthawks Peter Jacobs	To Toronto Rock Sandy Chapman
October 15, 2009	To Rochester Knighthawks Aaron Bold; Ian Rubel; Cody Johnson	To Minnesota Swarm Ryan Hoff second round pick, 2011 entry draft

=== Entry draft ===
The 2009 NLL Entry Draft took place on September 9, 2009. The Knighthawks selected the following players:

Round	Overall	Player	College/Club
1	1	Sid Smith	Syracuse University
1	2	Ilija Gajic	Denver University
2	18	Holdon Vyse	Six Nations, ON
3	28	Brendan Doran	Brampton, ON
3	34	Ryan Hoff	University of Notre Dame
5	47	Dan Groot	University of Maryland
6	57	Brandon Corp	Colgate University

== Roster ==
2010 Rochester Knighthawks roster
Active (21-man) roster		Inactive roster	Coaches
Goaltenders: 39 (Canada) Pat O'Toole; 52 (Haudenosaunee) Ben Van Every; Defensemen: 7 (Canada) Mac Allen; 12 (Canada) Troy Bonterre; 5 (Canada) Sandy Chapman; 42 (United States) Pat Cougevan; 20 (Canada) Bill Greer; -- (United States) Anthony Kelly; 71 (Canada) Kyle Laverty	Forwards: 15 (Canada) Shawn Evans; 22 (Canada) Gary Gait; 88 (Canada) Jason Henhawk; 73 (Haudenosaunee) Dean Hill; 14 (Canada) Mat MacLeod; 32 (Canada) Ken Millin; 9 (Haudenosaunee) Craig Point; 1 (United States) Joe Walters; 51 (Canada) Shawn Williams; 90 (Canada) Jamie Rooney; 26 (Canada) Andrew Potter; Transition: 21 (Haudenosaunee) Stuart Hill; 2 (United States) Chris Schiller; 36 (United States) Andrew Spack; 17 (Canada) Steve Toll; 25 (Canada) Bobby McBride	Practice squad: 18 (Canada) Jesse Guerin; 30 (Haudenosaunee) Jake Henhawk; -- (Canada) Darcy Powless; 6 (Canada) Pat Saunders; Injured reserve: 19 (Canada) Scott Evans; 24 (Canada) John Grant; 26 (Haudenosaunee) Chandon Hill; 6 (Haudenosaunee) Logan Kane; 9 (Canada) Joel McCready; 28 (Haudenosaunee) Mitch Nanticoke; Holdout: -- (United States) Kyle Guadagnolo; Protected list: 3 (Canada) Chris Courtney; 25 (United States) Scott Ditzell	Head coach {{{Head Coach}}} Legend: * Suspended list; (C) Captain; (A) Alternate captain; Roster updated 2009-02-25; NLL Transactions

== See also ==
- 2010 NLL season
