= 2010 Orlando Titans season =

2010 Orlando Titans
- League: NLL
- Division: 1st East
- 2010 record: 11-5
- Home record: 5-3
- Road record: 6-2
- Goals for: 172
- Goals against: 154
- General Manager: Timothy Kelly
- Coach: Ed Comeau
- Arena: Amway Arena
- Average attendance: 6,934

Team leaders
- Goals: Casey Powell (44)
- Assists: Jordan Hall (58)
- Points: Casey Powell (80)
- Penalties in minutes: Rory Smith (104)
- Loose Balls: John Orsen (114)
- Wins: Matt Vinc (10)
- Goals against average: Matt Vinc (9.51)

The Orlando Titans was a lacrosse team based in Orlando, Florida playing in the National Lacrosse League (NLL). The 2010 season was their only season in Orlando. The franchise previously played three seasons in New York City as the New York Titans.

== Regular season ==
=== Conference standings ===
East Division
P	Team	GP	W	L	PCT	GB	Home	Road	GF	GA	Diff	GF/GP	GA/GP
1	Orlando Titans – xy	16	11	5	.688	0.0	5–3	6–2	172	154	+18	10.75	9.62
2	Toronto Rock – x	16	9	7	.562	2.0	6–2	3–5	197	156	+41	12.31	9.75
3	Buffalo Bandits – x	16	8	8	.500	3.0	4–4	4–4	169	170	−1	10.56	10.62
4	Boston Blazers – x	16	8	8	.500	3.0	5–3	3–5	161	162	−1	10.06	10.12
5	Rochester Knighthawks	16	7	9	.438	4.0	4–4	3–5	155	181	−26	9.69	11.31
6	Philadelphia Wings	16	5	11	.312	6.0	3–5	2–6	168	194	−26	10.50	12.12

West Division
P	Team	GP	W	L	PCT	GB	Home	Road	GF	GA	Diff	GF/GP	GA/GP
1	Washington Stealth – xyz	16	11	5	.688	0.0	6–2	5–3	211	179	+32	13.19	11.19
2	Calgary Roughnecks – x	16	10	6	.625	1.0	5–3	5–3	193	169	+24	12.06	10.56
3	Edmonton Rush – x	16	10	6	.625	1.0	5–3	5–3	186	201	−15	11.62	12.56
4	Minnesota Swarm – x	16	5	11	.312	6.0	3–5	2–6	189	201	−12	11.81	12.56
5	Colorado Mammoth	16	4	12	.250	7.0	0–8	4–4	167	201	−34	10.44	12.56

x: Clinched playoff berth; c: Clinched playoff berth by crossing over to another division; y: Clinched division; z: Clinched best regular season record; GP: Games Played
W: Wins; L: Losses; GB: Games back; PCT: Win percentage; Home: Record at Home; Road: Record on the Road; GF: Goals scored; GA: Goals allowed
Differential: Difference between goals scored and allowed; GF/GP: Average number of goals scored per game; GA/GP: Average number of goals allowed per game

=== Game log ===
Game	Date	Opponent	Location	Score	OT	Attendance	Record
1	January 8, 2010	Philadelphia Wings	Amway Arena	W 13–8		8,145	1–0
2	January 23, 2010	@ Boston Blazers	TD Banknorth Garden	L 9–13		7,812	1–1
3	January 29, 2010	Rochester Knighthawks	Amway Arena	W 13–8		7,367	2–1
4	February 5, 2010	@ Colorado Mammoth	Pepsi Center	W 12–5		13,953	3–1
5	February 20, 2010	Boston Blazers	Amway Arena	L 11–12	OT	8,442	3–2
6	February 27, 2010	@ Toronto Rock	Air Canada Centre	W 16–12		10,984	4–2
7	March 6, 2010	@ Buffalo Bandits	HSBC Arena	L 10–12		16,184	4–3
8	March 12, 2010	Philadelphia Wings	Amway Arena	W 11–9		5,236	5–3
9	March 13, 2010	@ Rochester Knighthawks	Blue Cross Arena	W 9–4		5,930	6–3
10	March 20, 2010	Calgary Roughnecks	Amway Arena	L 6–13		6,092	6–4
11	March 27, 2010	Toronto Rock	Amway Arena	W 10–8		5,691	7–4
12	April 3, 2010	@ Boston Blazers	TD Banknorth Garden	W 13–10		8,168	8–4
13	April 10, 2010	Washington Stealth	Amway Arena	L 7–17		7,101	8–5
14	April 16, 2010	Buffalo Bandits	Amway Arena	W 9–7		7,399	9–5
15	April 23, 2010	@ Philadelphia Wings	Wachovia Center	W 11–5		8,656	10–5
16	April 24, 2010	@ Minnesota Swarm	Xcel Energy Center	W 12–11	OT	10,768	11–5

== Playoffs ==
=== Game log ===
Game	Date	Opponent	Location	Score	OT	Attendance	Record
Division Semifinal	May 1, 2010	Boston Blazers	Amway Arena	W 12–11		4,205	1–0
Division Final	May 8, 2010	Toronto Rock	Amway Arena	L 10–15		4,651	1–1

== Transactions ==
=== Entry draft ===
The 2009 NLL Entry Draft took place on September 9, 2009. The Titans selected the following players:

Round	Overall	Player	College/Club
2	19	Dan Hardy	Syracuse University
2	22	Michael Evans	Johns Hopkins University
4	41	Kenny Nims	Syracuse University
5	50	Ryan Learn	Burlington, ON
6	61	Ryan McCafferty	Elizabethtown College

== Roster ==
Orlando Titans roster
Active (21-man) roster		Inactive roster	Coaches
Starting goaltender: 48 (Canada) Matt Vinc; Backup goaltenders: 21 (United States) Erik Miller; 1 (Canada) Kurtis Wagar; Defensemen: 3 (United States) Matt Alrich; 41 (United States) Bryan Barrett; 6 (United States) Jeff Bigas; 21 (Canada) Chet Koneczny; 16 (Canada) Patrick Merrill; 24 (Canada) Rory Smith; 77 (United States) Nick O'Hara	Forwards: 14 (United States) Ryan Boyle; 42 (Canada) Pat Maddalena; 19 (Canada) Mike McLellan; 2 (Australia) Brendan Mundorf; 22 (United States) Casey Powell (C); Transition: 7 (Canada) Marc Burton; 44 (Canada) Jordan Hall; 72 (Canada) Chad Johnson; 34 (United States) Ryan Maciaszek; 12 (United States) Jarett Park; 18 (United States) Stephen Peyser	Injured reserve: 56 (United States) John Orsen; 10 (United States) Matt Zash; 20 (United States) Greg Peyser	Head coach {{{Head Coach}}} Legend: * Suspended list; (C) Captain; (A) Alternate captain; NLL Transactions

== See also ==
- 2010 NLL season
