= 2011 NLL season =

- League: National Lacrosse League
- Sport: Indoor lacrosse
- Duration: January 2011 – May 2011
- Games: 16
- Teams: 10

Draft
- Top draft pick: Cody Jamieson
- Picked by: Rochester Knighthawks

Regular season
- Top seed: Calgary Roughnecks
- Season MVP: Jeff Shattler (Calgary Roughnecks)
- Top scorer: Ryan Benesch (Minnesota Swarm)

Playoffs
- Finals champions: Toronto Rock (6th title)
- Runners-up: Washington Stealth
- Finals MVP: Bob Watson (Rock)

NLL seasons
- ← 2010 season 2012 season →

The 2011 National Lacrosse League season, the 25th in the history of the NLL, began on January 8, 2011, and ended with the Championship game, which was won by the Toronto Rock 8-7.

== Team movement ==
The Orlando Titans announced in July 2010 that they would not participate in the 2011 season, due to financial troubles. Some players were granted free agency while others were involved in a dispersal draft.

=== Teams ===
2011 National Lacrosse League
Division	Team	City	Arena	Capacity
East	Boston Blazers	Boston, Massachusetts	TD Garden	17,850
East	Buffalo Bandits	Buffalo, New York	HSBC Arena	18,690
East	Philadelphia Wings	Philadelphia, Pennsylvania	Wachovia Center	19,537
East	Rochester Knighthawks	Rochester, New York	Blue Cross Arena	10,662
East	Toronto Rock	Toronto, Ontario	Air Canada Centre	18,800
West	Calgary Roughnecks	Calgary, Alberta	Scotiabank Saddledome	19,289
West	Colorado Mammoth	Denver, Colorado	Pepsi Center	18,007
West	Edmonton Rush	Edmonton, Alberta	Rexall Place	16,839
West	Minnesota Swarm	Saint Paul, Minnesota	XCEL Energy Center	18,064
West	Washington Stealth	Everett, Washington	Comcast Arena at Everett	8,513

=== Map of teams ===
East Division West Division

== Final standings ==
East Division
P	Team	GP	W	L	PCT	GB	Home	Road	GF	GA	Diff	GF/GP	GA/GP
1	Buffalo Bandits – xy	16	10	6	.625	0.0	4–4	6–2	169	159	+10	10.56	9.94
2	Toronto Rock – x	16	10	6	.625	0.0	7–1	3–5	187	168	+19	11.69	10.50
3	Rochester Knighthawks – x	16	10	6	.625	0.0	4–4	6–2	176	159	+17	11.00	9.94
4	Boston Blazers – x	16	8	8	.500	2.0	4–4	4–4	166	155	+11	10.38	9.69
5	Philadelphia Wings	16	5	11	.312	5.0	2–6	3–5	143	179	−36	8.94	11.19

West Division
P	Team	GP	W	L	PCT	GB	Home	Road	GF	GA	Diff	GF/GP	GA/GP
1	Calgary Roughnecks – xyz	16	11	5	.688	0.0	6–2	5–3	198	181	+17	12.38	11.31
2	Minnesota Swarm – x	16	8	8	.500	3.0	5–3	3–5	187	180	+7	11.69	11.25
3	Washington Stealth – x	16	8	8	.500	3.0	3–5	5–3	203	198	+5	12.69	12.38
4	Colorado Mammoth – x	16	5	11	.312	6.0	3–5	2–6	151	172	−21	9.44	10.75
5	Edmonton Rush	16	5	11	.312	6.0	4–4	1–7	175	204	−29	10.94	12.75

x: Clinched playoff berth; c: Clinched playoff berth by crossing over to another division; y: Clinched division; z: Clinched best regular season record; GP: Games Played
W: Wins; L: Losses; GB: Games back; PCT: Win percentage; Home: Record at Home; Road: Record on the Road; GF: Goals scored; GA: Goals allowed
Differential: Difference between goals scored and allowed; GF/GP: Average number of goals scored per game; GA/GP: Average number of goals allowed per game

== Scoring leaders ==
Note: GP = Games played; G = Goals; A = Assists; Pts = Points; PIM = Penalty minutes; LB = Loose Balls

Player	Team	GP	G	A	Pts	PIM	LB
Ryan Benesch	Minnesota Swarm	16	46	49	95	4	79
Lewis Ratcliff	Washington Stealth	16	41	51	92	2	62
Dan Dawson	Boston Blazers	16	31	59	90	6	65
Rhys Duch	Washington Stealth	16	42	48	90	6	74
John Grant Jr.	Colorado Mammoth	16	36	47	83	12	45
Casey Powell	Boston Blazers	15	34	47	81	10	59
John Tavares	Buffalo Bandits	16	32	46	78	10	59
Shawn Williams	Rochester Knighthawks	16	23	54	77	2	64
Stephan Leblanc	Toronto Rock	15	33	43	76	8	75
Blaine Manning	Washington Stealth	16	23	52	75	14	62
Jeff Shattler	Calgary Roughnecks	15	29	46	75	20	93
Dane Dobbie	Calgary Roughnecks	15	34	41	75	34	55
Garrett Billings	Toronto Rock	15	31	44	75	8	64

== Leading goaltenders ==
Note: GP = Games played; Mins = Minutes played; W = Wins; L = Losses: GA = Goals Allowed; SV% = Save Percentage; GAA = Goals against average

Player	Team	GP	Mins	W	L	GA	SV%	GAA
Anthony Cosmo	Boston Blazers	16	913	8	7	147	0.767	9.66
Michael Thompson	Buffalo Bandits	16	763	10	3	123	0.785	9.67
Matt Vinc	Rochester Knighthawks	16	933	10	6	152	0.794	9.77
Chris Levis	Colorado Mammoth	16	840	5	9	140	0.784	9.99
Bob Watson	Toronto Rock	16	850	10	4	143	0.788	10.09

== Playoffs ==
Divisional Semifinal
E1	Buffalo	11
E4	Boston	10
Eastern Division
E2	Toronto	10
E3	Rochester	8
W1	Calgary	10
W4	Colorado	6
Western Division
W2	Minnesota	8
W3	Washington	14

Divisional Final
E1	Buffalo	11
E2	Toronto	12
W1	Calgary	8
W3	Washington	10

Champion's Cup Final
E2	Toronto	8
W3	Washington	7

=== Division Semifinals ===
==== (E1) Buffalo Bandits vs. (E4) Boston Blazers ====
April 30, 2011	Buffalo Bandits	11–10 (2–1, 5–3, 2–1, 2–5)	Boston Blazers	HSBC Arena; Attendance: 11,273

Game reference

Michael Thompson
Goalies
Anthony Cosmo

Steenhuis (Tavares, Montour) – 03:41	1–0
Vyse (Tavares, Montour) – 09:17	2–0
	2–1	09:53 – Rooney (Dawson, Powell) (PP)
Tavares (Vyse) (PP) – 22:25	3–1
Vyse (Montour, Thompson) – 23:51	4–1
	4–2	24:13 – Cotter (Rooney, Hotaling)
Vyse (Steenhuis, Tavares) – 25:31	5–2
Kelusky (Culp, Thenhaus) – 25:33	6–2
	6–3	26:09 – Powell (Dawson, Buchanan)
Culp (Montour, White) – 26:49	7–3
	7–4	29:45 – Rooney (Dawson) (PP)
	7–5	30:56 – Powell (Buchanan, Dawson)
Vyse (Tavares) – 31:49	8–5
Steenhuis (Culp, Hill) – 32:19	9–5
	9–6	47:19 – Powell (Dawson, Sanderson) (PP)
Tavares (Steenhuis) (PP) – 55:15	10–6
	10–7	55:32 – Dawson (Sanderson, Powell)
	10–8	56:25 – Dawson (Buchanan, Belisle)
	10–9	57:10 – Powell (Buchanan, Downing)
	10–10	58:13 – Buchanan (Cotter, Dawson)
Tavares (Culp, Vyse) – 59:20	11–10

14 min
Penalties
10 min
40
Shots
52

==== (E2) Toronto Rock vs. (E3) Rochester Knighthawks ====
May 1, 2011	Toronto Rock	10–8 (3–3, 3–0, 2–1, 2–4)	Rochester Knighthawks	Air Canada Centre; Attendance: 10,228

Game reference

Bob Watson
Goalies
Matt Vinc

	0–1	04:15 – Davis (Hall, Jamieson)
Chapman – 05:05	1–1
Doyle (Manning) – 12:20	2–1
Pascas (Leblanc, Billings) – 12:45	3–1
	3–2	07:17 – Evans (Jamieson, Williams) (PP)
	3–3	10:42 – Hall (Williams, Campbell)
Merrill (Hobbins) (SH) – 21:38	4–3
Billings (PP) – 24:37	5–3
Billings (Doyle) (PP) – 27:58	6–3
Billings (Doyle) – 36:43	7–3
Manning (Doyle) – 37:44	8–3
	8–4	40:52 – Accursi (Hall, Evans)
	8–5	46:53 – Williams (Davis, Hall)
	8–6	47:30 – Hall (PS)
Doyle (Billings, Hellyer) – 47:47	9–6
	9–7	50:39 – Evans (Williams, Jamieson) (PP)
Doyle (Billings, Leblanc) – 57:05	10–7
	10–8	59:24 – Accursi (Evans, Schiller)

8 min
Penalties
12 min
54
Shots
41

==== (W1) Calgary Roughnecks vs. (W4) Colorado Mammoth ====
April 30, 2011	Calgary Roughnecks	10–6 (2–3, 4–0, 1–1, 3–2)	Colorado Mammoth	Scotiabank Saddledome; Attendance: 10,092

Game reference

Mike Poulin
Goalies
Matt King

	0–1	02:19 – A. Gajic (Prout, Grant) (PP)
Dobbie (S. Carnegie, Snider) – 02:46	1–1
Ranger (Dickson) – 10:58	2–1
	2–2	12:48 – I. Gajic
	2–3	13:08 – Carlson
Ranger (Shattler) – 18:36	3–3
Shattler (Ranger, Dobbie) (PP) – 24:34	4–3
Dickson (Veltman, Shattler) – 27:35	5–3
Dobbie (M. Carnegie, Snider) – 27:42	6–3
	6–4	41:53 – Grant (Carey, Prout)
Dickson (Snider) – 42:07	7–4
Dobbie (Veltman, Shattler) – 46:08	8–4
	8–5	47:40 – Grant (Langtry, Carey) (PP)
	8–6	52:58 – Grant (Langtry) (PP)
McBride (Kilby) (ENG) – 58:35	9–6
Ranger (Shattler) (PP, ENG) – 59:53	10–6

12 min
Penalties
12 min
43
Shots
49

==== (W2) Minnesota Swarm vs. (W3) Washington Stealth ====
April 30, 2011	Minnesota Swarm	8–14 (5–3, 1–3, 2–4, 0–4)	Washington Stealth	Xcel Energy Center; Attendance: 5,878

Game reference

Nick Patterson
Goalies
Tyler Richards
Matt Roik

Morgan – 01:50	1–0
Crawford (Sullivan, Shewchuk) – 03:27	2–0
	2–1	04:53 – Smith (Wiles, Duch)
Wilson (Ross, Benesch) (PP) – 10:16	3–1
Shewchuk (Wilson, Sullivan) – 10:38	4–1
Suitor (Kelly) – 11:32	5–1
	5–2	11:57 – Ratcliff (Zywicki, Duch)
	5–3	12:21 – Moleski (Rabil)
Ross (Wilson, Sullivan) – 20:52	6–3
	6–4	23:31 – Sedgwick (Smith, Beers)
	6–5	27:40 – Ratcliff (Smith, Beers)
	6–6	29:15 – Ratcliff (Sedgwick, Richards)
Crawford (Benesch, Ross) – 32:43	7–6
	7–7	34:45 – Duch (Ratcliff, Rabil)
	7–8	37:28 – Beers (Rabil)
	7–9	38:24 – Zywicki (O'Dougherty, Grimes)
Ross (Benesch, Crawford) (PP) – 41:55	8–9
	8–10	43:56 – Zywicki (Grimes)
	8–11	47:50 – Duch (Zywicki, Sedgwick)
	8–12	48:49 – Duch (Ratcliff, Wiles)
	8–13	54:30 – Sedgwick (Duch, Ratcliff)
	8–14	55:38 – Wiles (Duch)

12 min
Penalties
20 min
48
Shots
52

=== Division Finals ===
==== (E1) Buffalo Bandits vs. (E2) Toronto Rock ====
May 7, 2011	Buffalo Bandits	11–12 (0–4, 6–5, 1–2, 4–1)	Toronto Rock	HSBC Arena; Attendance: 12,349

Game reference
Michael Thompson; Angus Goodleaf	Goalies	Bob Watson
22 min	Penalties	14 min
46	Shots	51

==== (W1) Calgary Roughnecks vs. (W3) Washington Stealth ====
May 7, 2011	Calgary Roughnecks	8–10 (3–1, 0–3, 1–4, 4–2)	Washington Stealth	Scotiabank Saddledome; Attendance: 10,125

Game reference
Tyler Richards	Goalies	Mike Poulin
29 min	Penalties	31 min
52	Shots	53

=== NLL Finals ===
==== (E2) Toronto Rock vs. (W3) Washington Stealth ====
May 15, 2011	Toronto Rock	8–7 (2–1, 5–1, 0–2, 1–3)	Washington Stealth	Air Canada Centre; Attendance: 14,488

Game reference
Bob Watson	Goalies	Tyler Richards
25 min	Penalties	10 min
58	Shots	53

== Milestones and events ==
=== Pre-season ===
- July 30, 2010: The league announced that the Orlando Titans would not be participating in the 2011 season.

=== Regular season ===
- John Tavares scores the first goal of the game against the Philadelphia Wings at the Wells Fargo Center in a 16–7 win, marking the first player in league history to reach 700 goals scored.
- The following week at home against the same team, Tavares would become the first person to tally 1,500 career points.

== Awards ==
=== Annual ===
Award	Winner	Team
Most Valuable Player	Jeff Shattler	Calgary Roughnecks
Goaltender of the Year	Matt Vinc	Rochester Knighthawks
Defensive Player of the Year	Pat McCready	Rochester Knighthawks
Transition Player of the Year	Jeff Shattler	Calgary Roughnecks
Rookie of the Year	Curtis Dickson	Calgary Roughnecks
Sportsmanship Award	Jordan Hall	Rochester Knighthawks
GM of the Year	Curt Styres	Rochester Knighthawks
Les Bartley Award	Mike Hasen	Rochester Knighthawks
Executive of the Year Award	Curt Styres	Rochester Knighthawks
Tom Borrelli Award	Budd Bailey	

=== All-Pro teams ===
First Team

- Jeff Shattler, Calgary
- Pat McCready, Rochester
- Matt Vinc, Rochester
- Ryan Benesch, Minnesota
- Rhys Duch, Washington
- Dan Dawson, Boston

Second Team

- Lewis Ratcliff, Washington
- John Tavares, Buffalo
- Stephan Leblanc, Toronto
- Brodie Merrill, Edmonton
- Mike Carnegie, Calgary
- Anthony Cosmo, Boston

=== All-Rookie team ===
- Curtis Dickson, Calgary
- Cody Jamieson, Rochester
- Kyle Rubisch, Boston
- Aaron Pascas, Toronto
- Andrew Suitor, Minnesota
- Tyler Hass, Minnesota

=== Weekly awards ===
The NLL gives out awards weekly for the best overall player, best offensive player, best transition player, best defensive player, and best rookie.

Month	Week	Overall	Offensive	Defensive	Transition	Rookie
January	1	Bob Watson	Scott Ranger	Mike Poulin	Paul Rabil	Aaron Pascas
January	2	Ryan Benesch	Ryan Benesch	Nick Patterson	Mark Steenhuis	Cody Jamieson
January	3	Stephan Leblanc	Luke Wiles	Nick Patterson	Brodie Merrill	Cody Jamieson
January	4	Brandon Miller	Dane Dobbie	Bob Watson	Jeff Shattler	Curtis Dickson
February	5	Shawn Evans	Dan Dawson	Tyler Richards	Jordan Hall	Cody Jamieson
February	6	John Tavares	John Tavares	Anthony Cosmo	Paul Rabil	Aaron Pascas
February	7	Bob Watson	Garrett Billings	Jeff Moleski	Ryan Hotaling	Curtis Dickson
February	8	Colin Doyle	Colin Doyle	Sandy Chapman	Jordan Hall	Cody Jamieson
March	9	Mike Thompson	Lewis Ratcliff	Mike Grimes	Jordan Hall	Rob Hellyer
March	10	Jeff Shattler	John Tavares	Chris Corbeil	Jeff Shattler	Curtis Dickson
March	11	Dane Dobbie	Dane Dobbie	Nolan Heavenor	Jeff Shattler	Curtis Dickson
March	12	Zack Greer	Zack Greer	Scott Campbell	Jeff Shattler	Curtis Dickson
April	13	John Grant	Shawn Williams	Matt Roik	Jordan Hall	Andrew Suitor
April	14	Rhys Duch	Dan Dawson	Mike Thompson	Tom Montour	Cody Jamieson
April	15	Kevin Buchanan	Kevin Buchanan	Chris Levis	Brodie Merrill	Kyle Rubisch
April	16	Ryan Benesch	Ryan Benesch	Nick Patterson	Jordan Hall	Cody Jamieson

=== Monthly awards ===
Awards are also given out monthly for the best overall player and best rookie.

Month	Overall	Rookie
January	Bob Watson	Curtis Dickson
February	Garrett Billings	Kyle Rubisch
March	Jeff Shattler	Curtis Dickson
April	Ryan Benesch	Cody Jamieson

== Attendance ==
=== Regular season ===
Home team	Home games	Average attendance	Total attendance
Buffalo Bandits	8	17,095	136,765
Colorado Mammoth	8	15,865	126,927
Calgary Roughnecks	8	10,384	83,074
Boston Blazers	8	8,712	69,696
Philadelphia Wings	8	8,661	69,294
Toronto Rock	8	8,513	68,108
Minnesota Swarm	8	8,287	66,302
Edmonton Rush	8	7,151	57,214
Rochester Knighthawks	8	5,331	42,648
Washington Stealth	8	3,226	25,808
League	80	9,322	745,836

=== Playoffs ===
Home team	Home games	Average attendance	Total attendance
Toronto Rock	2	12,358	24,716
Buffalo Bandits	2	11,811	23,622
Calgary Roughnecks	2	10,108	20,217
Minnesota Swarm	1	5,878	5,878
League	7	10,633	74,433

== See also ==
- 2011 in sports
