= 2010 Philadelphia Wings season =

2010 Philadelphia Wings
- League: NLL
- Division: 6th East
- 2010 record: 5–11
- Home record: 3–5
- Road record: 2–6
- Goals for: 168
- Goals against: 194
- General Manager: Dave Huntley
- Coach: Dave Huntley
- Captain: Thomas Hajek
- Alternate captains: Shawn Nadelen; Geoff Snider
- Arena: Wachovia Center

Team leaders
- Goals: Drew Westervelt (32)
- Assists: Drew Westervelt (40)
- Points: Drew Westervelt (72)
- Penalties in minutes: Geoff Snider (79)
- Loose Balls: Geoff Snider (245)
- Wins: Brandon Miller (5)
- Goals against average: Brandon Miller (12.40)

The Philadelphia Wings are a lacrosse team based in Philadelphia, Pennsylvania, that plays in the National Lacrosse League (NLL). The 2010 season was the 24th in franchise history.

== Regular season ==
=== Conference standings ===
East Division
P	Team	GP	W	L	PCT	GB	Home	Road	GF	GA	Diff	GF/GP	GA/GP
1	Orlando Titans – xy	16	11	5	.688	0.0	5–3	6–2	172	154	+18	10.75	9.62
2	Toronto Rock – x	16	9	7	.562	2.0	6–2	3–5	197	156	+41	12.31	9.75
3	Buffalo Bandits – x	16	8	8	.500	3.0	4–4	4–4	169	170	−1	10.56	10.62
4	Boston Blazers – x	16	8	8	.500	3.0	5–3	3–5	161	162	−1	10.06	10.12
5	Rochester Knighthawks	16	7	9	.438	4.0	4–4	3–5	155	181	−26	9.69	11.31
6	Philadelphia Wings	16	5	11	.312	6.0	3–5	2–6	168	194	−26	10.50	12.12

West Division
P	Team	GP	W	L	PCT	GB	Home	Road	GF	GA	Diff	GF/GP	GA/GP
1	Washington Stealth – xyz	16	11	5	.688	0.0	6–2	5–3	211	179	+32	13.19	11.19
2	Calgary Roughnecks – x	16	10	6	.625	1.0	5–3	5–3	193	169	+24	12.06	10.56
3	Edmonton Rush – x	16	10	6	.625	1.0	5–3	5–3	186	201	−15	11.62	12.56
4	Minnesota Swarm – x	16	5	11	.312	6.0	3–5	2–6	189	201	−12	11.81	12.56
5	Colorado Mammoth	16	4	12	.250	7.0	0–8	4–4	167	201	−34	10.44	12.56

x: Clinched playoff berth; c: Clinched playoff berth by crossing over to another division; y: Clinched division; z: Clinched best regular season record; GP: Games Played
W: Wins; L: Losses; GB: Games back; PCT: Win percentage; Home: Record at Home; Road: Record on the Road; GF: Goals scored; GA: Goals allowed
Differential: Difference between goals scored and allowed; GF/GP: Average number of goals scored per game; GA/GP: Average number of goals allowed per game

=== Game log ===
Game	Date	Opponent	Location	Score	OT	Attendance	Record
1	January 8, 2010	@ Orlando Titans	Amway Arena	L 8–13		8,145	0–1
2	January 16, 2010	Boston Blazers	Wachovia Center	W 12–8		9,330	1–1
3	January 23, 2010	Colorado Mammoth	Wachovia Center	L 11–12	OT	8,201	1–2
4	January 30, 2010	@ Boston Blazers	TD Banknorth Garden	L 9–11		7,289	1–3
5	February 5, 2010	@ Toronto Rock	Air Canada Centre	L 11–19		10,256	1–4
6	February 13, 2010	Buffalo Bandits	Wachovia Center	L 11–13		7,723	1–5
7	February 20, 2010	Rochester Knighthawks	Wachovia Center	L 6–12		10,019	1–6
8	February 27, 2010	@ Buffalo Bandits	HSBC Arena	W 15–11		15,336	2–6
9	March 6, 2010	@ Calgary Roughnecks	Pengrowth Saddledome	L 7–15		11,007	2–7
10	March 12, 2010	@ Orlando Titans	Amway Arena	L 9–11		5,236	2–8
11	March 13, 2010	Minnesota Swarm	Wachovia Center	W 20–11		10,248	3–8
12	March 27, 2010	Boston Blazers	Wachovia Center	W 13–7		11,241	4–8
13	April 3, 2010	Toronto Rock	Wachovia Center	L 6–13		10,246	4–9
14	April 10, 2010	@ Rochester Knighthawks	Blue Cross Arena	L 12–15		7,086	4–10
15	April 17, 2010	@ Minnesota Swarm	Xcel Energy Center	W 13–12	OT	9,229	5–10
16	April 23, 2010	Orlando Titans	Wachovia Center	L 5–11		8,656	5–11

== Transactions ==
=== New players ===
- Dan Teat – acquired in trade
- Mike Ward – acquired in trade

=== Players not returning ===
- Sean Thomson – traded

=== Trades ===
July 29, 2009	To Philadelphia Wings Dan Teat	To Edmonton Rush Derek Malawsky
September 3, 2009	To Philadelphia Wings Mike Ward	To Colorado Mammoth 5th round pick, 2009 entry draft
September 3, 2009	To Philadelphia Wings 4th round pick, 2009 entry draft	To Buffalo Bandits Jon Harasym
September 25, 2009	To Philadelphia Wings Kevin Colleluori; 3rd round pick, 2010 entry draft	To Minnesota Swarm Sean Thomson

=== Entry draft ===
The 2009 NLL Entry Draft took place on September 9, 2008. The Wings selected the following players:

Round	Overall	Player	College/Club
2	16	Bobby Snider	Bellarmine University
3	26	John Glynn	Cornell University
4	37	Peet Poillon	UMBC
4	40	Mike Timms	University of Virginia
5	45	PT Ricci	Loyola College

== Roster ==
2010 Philadelphia Wings roster
Active (21-man) roster		Inactive roster	Coaches
Goaltenders: 31 (Canada) Rob Blasdell; 36 (Canada) Brandon Miller; Defensemen: 1 (United States) Johnny Christmas; 28 (Canada) Thomas Hajek (C); 25 (United States) Pat Heim; 34 (United States) Shawn Nadelen (A); 55 (United States) Steve Panarelli; 19 (United States) Josh Sims; 7 (United States) Kyle Sweeney (A); 21 (United States) Jeff Reynolds; 41 (Canada) Bob Snider; 44 (Canada) Taylor Wray; 5 (United States) Mike Ward	Forwards: 23 (Canada) Athan Iannucci; 50 (United States) Kevin Huntley; 33 (United States) Bill McGlone; 15 (United States) Brett Moyer; 51 (Canada) Dan Teat; 9 (Canada) Merrick Thomson; 88 (Canada) Kyle Wailes; 26 (United States) Drew Westervelt; Transition: 17 (United States) Jordan Levine	Practice squad: 70 (United States) Mickey Hover; Injured reserve: 45 (United States) Kyle Fiat; -- (United States) Steve Grossi	Head coach {{{Head Coach}}} Legend: * Suspended list; (C) Captain; (A) Alternate captain; Roster updated 2010-01-21; NLL Transactions

== See also ==
- 2010 NLL season
