= Curtis Hodgson =

Canadian lacrosse player

Personal information
- Nationality: Canadian
- Born: August 12, 1981 (age 44) Burnaby, British Columbia
- Height: 6 ft 1 in (185 cm)
- Weight: 195 lb (88 kg; 13 st 13 lb)

Sport
- Position: Defense
- Shoots: Right
- NLL draft: 43rd overall, 2001; Vancouver Ravens
- NLL team: Washington Stealth
- WLA team: Victoria Shamrocks
- Pro career: 2005–2017

Curtis Hodgson (born August 12, 1981) is a former professional lacrosse defenseman for the Washington Stealth of the National Lacrosse League, where he won the Champions Cup.

He is currently a teacher at Burnaby Central Secondary School where he also serves as co-athletic director and teaches Social Studies and Physical Education.

He won two Minto Cup Championships with the Burnaby Junior A Lakers in 2000 and 2002.

== Early life and education ==
He was born in Burnaby, British Columbia. Hodgson earned a Bachelor's degree from Simon Fraser University where he played lacrosse for four seasons.

== NLL career ==
In the 2008 Season, with the Stealth, he scored four goals and added 10 assists for 14 points. His 95 loose balls were good for third on the team.

In 2010, Hodgson was a member of the Stealth when they won the Champions Cup. In 2011 and 2013, Hodgson returned to the finals with the Stealth but lost.

He retired from the NLL on October 3, 2017. The stealth retired his jersey, which was the first time they had done that in their team's history.

== WLA career ==
Hodgson currently plays for the New Westminster Salmonbellies in the Western Lacrosse Association (WLA). He was selected as the winner of the Gord Nicholson Trophy as the league's top defenseman in both 2007 and 2008. Further, he has been a four-time, first-team All-WLA selection (2005, 2006, 2007 and 2008).

== Statistics ==
=== NLL ===
| Curtis Hodgson | | Regular season | | | | | | | | | Playoffs | | | | | | | | |
| Season | Team | GP | G | A | Pts | LB | PIM | Pts/GP | LB/GP | PIM/GP | GP | G | A | Pts | LB | PIM | Pts/GP | LB/GP | PIM/GP |
|---|---|---|---|---|---|---|---|---|---|---|---|---|---|---|---|---|---|---|---|
| 2005 | San Jose Stealth | 16 | 4 | 4 | 8 | 44 | 6 | 0.50 | 2.75 | 0.38 | 0 | 0 | 0 | 0 | 0 | 0 | 0.00 | 0.00 | 0.00 |
| 2006 | San Jose Stealth | 16 | 3 | 5 | 8 | 68 | 0 | 0.50 | 4.25 | 0.00 | 0 | 0 | 0 | 0 | 0 | 0 | 0.00 | 0.00 | 0.00 |
| 2007 | San Jose Stealth | 16 | 4 | 9 | 13 | 64 | 12 | 0.81 | 4.00 | 0.75 | 2 | 0 | 1 | 1 | 10 | 0 | 0.50 | 5.00 | 0.00 |
| 2008 | San Jose Stealth | 16 | 4 | 10 | 14 | 95 | 18 | 0.88 | 5.94 | 1.13 | 1 | 0 | 0 | 0 | 1 | 0 | 0.00 | 1.00 | 0.00 |
| 2009 | San Jose Stealth | 16 | 4 | 8 | 12 | 82 | 16 | 0.75 | 5.13 | 1.00 | 2 | 1 | 0 | 1 | 6 | 0 | 0.50 | 3.00 | 0.00 |
| 2010 | Washington Stealth | 15 | 5 | 0 | 5 | 52 | 0 | 0.33 | 3.47 | 0.00 | 3 | 0 | 2 | 2 | 12 | 0 | 0.67 | 4.00 | 0.00 |
| 2011 | Washington Stealth | 16 | 0 | 7 | 7 | 41 | 24 | 0.44 | 2.56 | 1.50 | 3 | 0 | 0 | 0 | 10 | 0 | 0.00 | 3.33 | 0.00 |
| 2012 | Washington Stealth | 16 | 5 | 2 | 7 | 52 | 12 | 0.44 | 3.25 | 0.75 | 0 | 0 | 0 | 0 | 0 | 0 | 0.00 | 0.00 | 0.00 |
| 2013 | Washington Stealth | 16 | 3 | 4 | 7 | 45 | 2 | 0.44 | 2.81 | 0.13 | 3 | 0 | 0 | 0 | 8 | 0 | 0.00 | 2.67 | 0.00 |
| 2014 | Vancouver Stealth | 18 | 1 | 8 | 9 | 57 | 0 | 0.50 | 3.17 | 0.00 | 0 | 0 | 0 | 0 | 0 | 0 | 0.00 | 0.00 | 0.00 |
| 2015 | Vancouver Stealth | 18 | 1 | 4 | 5 | 45 | 6 | 0.28 | 2.50 | 0.33 | 0 | 0 | 0 | 0 | 0 | 0 | 0.00 | 0.00 | 0.00 |
| 2016 | Vancouver Stealth | 18 | 0 | 5 | 5 | 39 | 8 | 0.28 | 2.17 | 0.44 | 0 | 0 | 0 | 0 | 0 | 0 | 0.00 | 0.00 | 0.00 |
| 2017 | Vancouver Stealth | 14 | 1 | 4 | 5 | 24 | 0 | 0.36 | 1.71 | 0.00 | 1 | 0 | 0 | 0 | 1 | 0 | 0.00 | 1.00 | 0.00 |
| | | 211 | 35 | 70 | 105 | 708 | 104 | 0.50 | 3.36 | 0.49 | 15 | 1 | 3 | 4 | 48 | 0 | 0.27 | 3.20 | 0.00 |
| Career Total: | | 226 | 36 | 73 | 109 | 756 | 104 | 0.48 | 3.35 | 0.46 | | | | | | | | | |

GP–Games played; G–Goals; A–Assists; Pts–Points; LB–Loose balls; PIM–Penalty minutes; Pts/GP–Points per games played; LB/GP–Loose balls per games played; PIM/GP–Penalty minutes per games played.

=== WLA ===
| | | Regular Season | | | | | Playoffs |
| Season | Team | GP | G | A | Pts | PIM | GP | G | A | Pts | PIM |
|---|---|---|---|---|---|---|---|---|---|---|---|
| 2005 | Burnaby | 15 | 13 | 16 | 29 | 15 | -- | -- | -- | -- | -- |
| 2006 | Burnaby | 16 | 12 | 11 | 23 | 19 | 5 | 0 | 2 | 2 | 4 |
| 2007 | Burnaby | 16 | 8 | 16 | 24 | 9 | 6 | 4 | 2 | 6 | 0 |
| 2008 | Burnaby | 11 | 5 | 3 | 8 | 8 | 7 | 2 | 3 | 5 | 6 |
| 2009 | Victoria | 7 | 2 | 0 | 2 | 0 | 5 | 2 | 2 | 4 | 4 |
| WLA Totals | | 65 | 40 | 46 | 86 | 51 | 23 | 8 | 9 | 17 | 14 |
