= 2010 Calgary Roughnecks season =

2010 Calgary Roughnecks
- League: NLL
- Division: West
- 2010 record: 10-6
- General Manager: Brad Banister
- Coach: Dave Pym
- Captain: Tracey Kelusky
- Alternate captains: Kaleb Toth
- Arena: Pengrowth Saddledome

Team leaders
- Goals: Dane Dobbie
- Assists: Josh Sanderson
- Penalties in minutes: Curtis Manning & Jeff Moleski
- Loose Balls: Jeff Shattler
- Wins: Matt King
- Goals against average: Matt King

The Calgary Roughnecks are a lacrosse team based in Calgary playing in the National Lacrosse League (NLL). The 2010 season was the 9th in franchise history.

Despite winning the Champion's Cup last season, the Roughnecks lost both their head coach and an assistant coach to the Toronto Rock. Former assistant coach Terry Sanderson resigned and was hired as the Rock's new GM, and Sanderson immediately persuaded his former boss in Calgary Troy Cordingley to take the job of head coach of the Rock. Assistant coach Dave Pym was named the new Roughnecks head coach. In addition, former player Curt Malawsky announced his retirement from playing and was hired as both Assistant General Manager and Assistant Coach.

== Regular season ==
=== Conference standings ===
East Division
P	Team	GP	W	L	PCT	GB	Home	Road	GF	GA	Diff	GF/GP	GA/GP
1	Orlando Titans – xy	16	11	5	.688	0.0	5–3	6–2	172	154	+18	10.75	9.62
2	Toronto Rock – x	16	9	7	.562	2.0	6–2	3–5	197	156	+41	12.31	9.75
3	Buffalo Bandits – x	16	8	8	.500	3.0	4–4	4–4	169	170	−1	10.56	10.62
4	Boston Blazers – x	16	8	8	.500	3.0	5–3	3–5	161	162	−1	10.06	10.12
5	Rochester Knighthawks	16	7	9	.438	4.0	4–4	3–5	155	181	−26	9.69	11.31
6	Philadelphia Wings	16	5	11	.312	6.0	3–5	2–6	168	194	−26	10.50	12.12

West Division
P	Team	GP	W	L	PCT	GB	Home	Road	GF	GA	Diff	GF/GP	GA/GP
1	Washington Stealth – xyz	16	11	5	.688	0.0	6–2	5–3	211	179	+32	13.19	11.19
2	Calgary Roughnecks – x	16	10	6	.625	1.0	5–3	5–3	193	169	+24	12.06	10.56
3	Edmonton Rush – x	16	10	6	.625	1.0	5–3	5–3	186	201	−15	11.62	12.56
4	Minnesota Swarm – x	16	5	11	.312	6.0	3–5	2–6	189	201	−12	11.81	12.56
5	Colorado Mammoth	16	4	12	.250	7.0	0–8	4–4	167	201	−34	10.44	12.56

x: Clinched playoff berth; c: Clinched playoff berth by crossing over to another division; y: Clinched division; z: Clinched best regular season record; GP: Games Played
W: Wins; L: Losses; GB: Games back; PCT: Win percentage; Home: Record at Home; Road: Record on the Road; GF: Goals scored; GA: Goals allowed
Differential: Difference between goals scored and allowed; GF/GP: Average number of goals scored per game; GA/GP: Average number of goals allowed per game

=== Game log ===
Game	Date	Opponent	Location	Score	OT	Attendance	Record
1	January 10, 2010	Minnesota Swarm	Pengrowth Saddledome	W 12–7		8,112	1–0
2	January 15, 2010	@ Minnesota Swarm	Xcel Energy Center	L 10–12		11,758	1–1
3	January 23, 2010	Washington Stealth	Pengrowth Saddledome	L 15–16		10,104	1–2
4	January 30, 2010	@ Edmonton Rush	Rexall Place	L 11–14		7,815	1–3
5	February 5, 2010	Edmonton Rush	Pengrowth Saddledome	W 13–8		10,724	2–3
6	February 14, 2010	Toronto Rock	Pengrowth Saddledome	W 10–8		10,193	3–3
7	February 19, 2010	@ Washington Stealth	Comcast Arena at Everett	W 13–9		3,450	4–3
8	March 6, 2010	Philadelphia Wings	Pengrowth Saddledome	W 15–7		11,007	5–3
9	March 13, 2010	Washington Stealth	Pengrowth Saddledome	L 11–12		10,402	5–4
10	March 20, 2010	@ Orlando Titans	Amway Arena	W 13–6		6,902	6–4
11	March 26, 2010	Minnesota Swarm	Pengrowth Saddledome	L 13–17		10,486	6–5
12	April 2, 2010	@ Toronto Rock	Air Canada Centre	L 8–9		9,108	6–6
13	April 3, 2010	@ Rochester Knighthawks	Blue Cross Arena	W 11–9		7,206	7–6
14	April 10, 2010	Colorado Mammoth	Pengrowth Saddledome	W 12–11		12,321	8–6
15	April 16, 2010	@ Edmonton Rush	Rexall Place	W 15–14	OT	9,423	9–6
16	April 23, 2010	@ Colorado Mammoth	Pepsi Center	W 11–10		15,727	10–6

== Playoffs ==
=== Game log ===
Game	Date	Opponent	Location	Score	OT	Attendance	Record
Division Semifinal	May 1, 2010	Edmonton Rush	Pengrowth Saddledome	L 7–11		10,388	0–1

== Transactions ==
=== New players ===
- Craig Conn - acquired in trade
- Rob Kirkby - returning from retirement
- Craig Gelsvik - returning from retirement

=== Players not returning ===
- Curt Malawsky - retired

=== Trades ===
September 3, 2009	To Calgary Roughnecks Craig Conn; Second round pick, 2010 entry draft	To Toronto Rock First round pick, 2009 entry draft Sixth round pick, 2011 entry draft

=== Entry draft ===
The 2009 NLL Entry Draft took place on September 9, 2008. The Roughnecks selected the following players:

Round	Overall	Player	College/Club
3	27	Carlton Schuss	Delta, BC
5	51	Garrett Werschke	Calgary, AB
6	62	Casey MacIntyre	Calgary, AB

== Roster ==
2010 Calgary Roughnecks roster
Active (21-man) roster		Inactive roster	Coaches
Goaltenders: 30 (Canada) Matt King; 33 (Canada) Mike Poulin; Defensemen: 16 (Canada) Mike Carnegie; 24 (Canada) Scott Carnegie; 20 (Canada) Bruce Codd; 26 (Canada) Craig Gelsvik; 55 (Canada) Mike Kilby; 15 (Canada) Rob Kirkby; 6 (Canada) John Lintz; 10 (Canada) Curtis Manning; 37 (Canada) Andrew McBride; 80 (Canada) Peter McFetridge; 14 (Canada) Jeff Moleski	Forwards: 8 (Canada) Craig Conn; 44 (Canada) Dane Dobbie; 71 (Canada) Scott Ranger; 19 (Canada) Josh Sanderson; 28 (Canada) Carlton Schuss; 77 (Canada) Jeff Shattler; 9 (Canada) Kaleb Toth (A); 17 (Canada) Tracey Kelusky (C); Transition: 40 (Canada) Nolan Heavenor; 7 (Canada) Rob Van Beek; 4 (Canada) Devan Wray		Head coach {{{Head Coach}}} Legend: * Suspended list; (C) Captain; (A) Alternate captain; Roster updated NLL Transactions

== See also ==
- 2010 NLL season
