= Tom Ryan (lacrosse) =

American lacrosse player and coach

Tom Ryan is a lacrosse coach and former professional player. He is currently the Head Women’s Lacrosse Coach at St. Lawrence University. Ryan is the former head coach of the Boston Blazers of the National Lacrosse League.

== Playing career ==
Ryan played his high school ball at Canton Central in NY. Ryan attended Bowdoin College where he was an All-American attackman. He amassed 97-points in his senior year to become the leading scorer in school history.

Ryan played in the National Lacrosse League where he was known as the "Dude" due to his long dreadlocked hair. He scored 202 total career points (82 goals and 120 assists) while playing for the Boston Blazers, Baltimore Thunder and the Philadelphia Wings. In addition, he played in the Heritage Cup for Team USA in 2002.

Ryan played in Major League Lacrosse's inaugural season in 2001 with the New Jersey Pride.

Ryan's playing career was cut short by a series of concussions.

== Coaching career ==
Ryan was awarded IMLCA Assistant Coach of the Year in DIII for his role in leading the St. Lawrence University team to a 18–3 record and NCAA Final Four appearance.

Ryan was Head Coach of the U.S. Indoor Lacrosse team for both the 2007 & 2011 World Indoor Lacrosse Championships.

Ryan has served as a coach for the women's lacrosse teams at Towson University and Loyola College. In addition, he has coached the men's lacrosse team at Connecticut College and Mount Ida College.

On May 9, 2007, the NLL announced that an expansion franchise had been granted to the city of Boston, and that Ryan had been named head coach. The team, which was named the Boston Blazers, was scheduled to begin play during the 2008 NLL season, but after a labour dispute that saw the season temporarily cancelled, the Blazers opted to sit out the 2008 season and begin play in 2009. Ryan was dismissed as the head coach of the Blazers on December 23, 2010.

== Statistics ==
=== NLL ===
		Regular Season						Playoffs
Season	Team	GP	G	A	Pts	LB	PIM	GP	G	A	Pts	LB	PIM
1995	Boston	4	2	1	3	11	0	1	0	0	0	0	2
1996	Boston	10	17	15	32	54	8	1	1	1	2	5	2
1997	Boston	10	15	8	23	34	10	-	-	-	-	-	-
1998	Baltimore	12	8	19	27	58	6	3	1	5	6	11	2
1999	Baltimore	10	2	11	13	26	24	1	0	0	0	5	0
2000	Philadelphia	11	6	12	18	38	23	1	0	1	1	6	2
2001	Philadelphia	14	10	22	32	70	18	2	1	4	5	11	7
2002	Philadelphia	16	15	25	40	110	22	1	0	2	2	8	0
2003	Philadelphia	8	7	7	14	35	2	-	-	-	-	-	-
NLL totals		95	82	120	202	436	113	10	3	13	16	46	15

=== MLL ===
		Regular Season							Playoffs
Season	Team	GP	G	2ptG	A	Pts	LB	PIM	GP	G	2ptG	A	Pts	LB	PIM
2001	New Jersey	14	9	0	7	16	15	2.5	-	-	-	-	-	-	-
MLL Totals		14	9	0	7	16	15	2.5	0	0	0	0	0	0	0

=== NLL head coaching statistics ===
Team	Season	Regular Season				Playoffs				Playoff result
Team	Season	GC	W	L	W%	GC	W	L	W%	Playoff result
Boston Blazers	2009	16	10	6	.625	1	0	1	.000	Lost Division Semifinal (BUF)
Boston Blazers	2010	16	8	8	.500	1	0	1	.000	Lost Division Semifinal (ORL)
Totals:	2	32	18	14	.563	2	0	2	.000	
