= Joel Dalgarno =

Canadian lacrosse player (born 1987)

Personal information
- Nationality: Canadian
- Born: June 29, 1986 (age 40) Port Coquitlam, British Columbia, Canada
- Height: 6 ft 0 in (183 cm)
- Weight: 180 lb (82 kg; 12 st 12 lb)

Sport
- Position: Attack
- NLL draft: 7th overall, 2009; Toronto Rock
- NLL team Former teams: Colorado Mammoth; Washington Stealth
- NCAA team: Ohio State Buckeyes
- Pro career: 2010–

Joel Dalgarno (born July 5, 1987) is a Canadian professional box lacrosse player. He was an All-American at the Ohio State University from 2006 to 2009, leading the Buckeyes to an NCAA Men's Lacrosse Championship tournament appearance in 2008. Dalgarno attended Western Reserve Academy as a prep star, and also starred in Canadian box lacrosse at the Junior A level. He was a two time All-American while at Ohio State.

Dalgarno was drafted 7th overall in the 2009 NLL draft by the Toronto Rock but before ever playing for the Rock, he was traded with Lewis Ratcliff and Tyler Codron to the Washington Stealth for Colin Doyle. Dalgarno played one season in Washington, collecting 16 points in 8 games. After appearing in two games during the 2011 season, Dalgarno was traded to the Colorado Mammoth along with Ian Hawskbee for Cliff Smith.

== Statistics ==
=== NLL ===
		Regular Season						Playoffs
Season	Team	GP	G	A	Pts	LB	PIM	GP	G	A	Pts	LB	PIM
2010	Washington	8	5	11	16	20	0	1	0	1	1	3	0
2011	Washington	2	3	1	4	5	0	--	--	--	--	--	--
2011	Colorado	7	12	10	22	29	2	1	0	0	0	3	0
NLL totals		17	20	22	42	54	2	2	0	1	1	6	0

=== Ohio State University ===
Season	GP	G	A	Pts	PPG
2006	13	22	17	39	--
2007	14	28	22	50	--
2008	17	39	32	71	--
2009	14	34	27	61	--
Totals	58	123	98	221	--

=== OLA/WLA/MSL Statistics ===
			Regular Season					Playoffs
Season	Team	League	GP	G	A	Pts	PIM	GP	G	A	Pts	PIM
2003	Poco	BCLA Jr A	9	9	18	27	8	2	--	3	3	4
2004	Poco	BCLA Jr A	3	1	7	8	4	--	--	--	--	--
2005	Poco	BCLA Jr A	8	11	10	21	4	3	6	5	11	2
2006	Poco	BCLA Jr A	12	15	22	37	21	13	12	29	41	48
2007	Poco	BCLA Jr A	5	6	11	4	5	4	10	14	4
2007	Maple Ridge	WLA SR A	1	0	3	3	0	--	--	--	--	--
2007	Coquitlam	WLA SR A	1	2	1	3	0	11	4	11	15	2
2008	Maple Ridge	WLA SR A	13	17	27	44	2	--	--	--	--	--
Junior A Totals			36	41	63	104	41	23	22	47	69	58
PRO/MAJOR/SENIOR TOTALS			15	19	31	50	2	11	4	11	15	2

== See also ==
- Maple Ridge Burrards
