= Sean Paul (disambiguation) =

Sean Paul (born 1973) is a Jamaican dancehall and reggae artist.

Sean Paul may also refer to:

- Sean Paul Joseph (born 1978), American rapper, member of the hip hop duo YoungBloodZ also known as Sean P
- Sean Paul Lockhart (born 1986), American actor, director and producer
- Sean Paul Morris (born 1983), American lacrosse player
