= Geoff McNulty =

Canadian lacrosse player

Geoff McNulty is a 5-foot 10 inch tall and 170 pound National Lacrosse League (Major Indoor Lacrosse League) player. McNulty was signed as a free agent by the Toronto Rock in late 2009 and played the 2010 season (#47) with the team there during scoring his first professional career goal on April 2, 2010. He played the 2011 NLL season with the Boston Blazers (#17). For the 2012 season, McNulty was with the Calgary Roughnecks (Inactive roster).
