= Bill Watkins (Seagate) =

William D. Watkins
- Born: c. 1953; Maracaibo, Venezuela
- Employer(s): Bridgelux, Incorporated
- Title: CEO
- Spouse: Denise
- Children: 3

William D. Watkins is the former CEO of Seagate Technology, the world's largest manufacturer of hard drives. Watkins was appointed as the company's CEO in 2004 and served in this position until January 2009. He was appointed as CEO of BridgeLux, an emerging solid state lighting company in Silicon Valley, in January 2010.

Between June 2000 and July 2004, Watkins served as president and chief operating officer and was responsible for Seagate's global hard disk drive operations. He was elected to Seagate's board of directors in 2004.

Watkins joined Seagate in 1996 as part of the company's merger with Conner Peripherals. While at Conner, he established the Conner Disk Division and managed its success through the merger with Seagate.

== Biography ==
Watkins's early life was marked by frequent moves. His father, a field manager in the oil industry, relocated the family every five years, from Venezuela to Canada to Wyoming, eventually settling in Pampa, Texas (USA). After graduating from Pampa High School in 1971, Watkins enlisted in the Army as a medic, assisting injured Vietnam veterans at a Missouri base. After leaving the Army and graduating from the University of Texas, Watkins hitchhiked to California, where he landed a job at Xidex, a Silicon Valley floppy disk manufacturer. More senior-level jobs followed at Domain, a drive-component manufacturer, and Conner. When Seagate acquired Conner, then-CEO Al Shugart made Watkins responsible for the company's four drive factories.

In an interview with Forbes magazine in 2006, Watkins recalled how the company's management culture rewarded those who "yelled the loudest" in meetings. Watkins was also frustrated by the fact that just 2 percent of Seagate's products shared common parts. He demanded the company's engineers design products that could be built using common components and machinery. The engineers started small, reducing the number of screws used in each product, and worked their way up to complex heads that write data onto the disks. Today, every one of Seagate's products can be manufactured on any of its line in any of its factories. Watkins's efficiency gains won him the job of chief operating officer in 1998.

He currently serves on the board of directors of the Silicon Valley chapter of the Leukemia and Lymphoma Society, along with the Silicon Valley Leadership Group. He also serves on the executive advisory council for IDEMA and the executive advisory board of the Juran Center for Leadership in Quality at the University of Minnesota.

An avid adventure racer, Watkins created "Eco Seagate" in 2000, as a way to change the company's often-divisive culture. He wanted to instill a greater sense of teamwork and accountability throughout the company. Each year, 200 employees spend a week hiking, kayaking, mountain biking and rappelling in preparation for a grueling one-day race. Participants are divided into teams led by a member of Watkins's executive team. The group must complete the course together, by supporting their weakest members. Seagate spends $2 million for every event, which has been held in New Zealand, Australia and Hawaii over the years. Watkins says the event has helped build a more collaborative environment at Seagate.

"It's all about the strength of the team," Watkins said in an interview with the San Francisco Chronicle in 2006. "You're always going to have team members who are weak. How do you work together to get through it? The whole idea is to get people relating to each other."

With his wife Denise, Watkins is the former owner of the Vancouver Stealth professional indoor lacrosse team, which won the National Lacrosse League championship in 2010.

He ceased being the CEO of Seagate in early 2009 after company profits have all but disintegrated and the stock has plummeted about 80 percent over 2008, compared with 45 percent at archrival Western Digital and 40 percent for the broad market indices. The company has also lost market share in the hot notebook computer segment and is behind the innovation curve on up-and-coming solid state drives.

He joined the Board of Directors of Vertical Circuits Inc. in March 2009.

He is married with three children: Kelly, Casey, and Christopher.
