= Doug Reffue =

Douglas Paul Reffue (born December 1, 1969, in Gloversville, New York) is the CEO of the consumer brands platform Cedar Brands and the founder of animal wellness corporation Pets 52. He formerly served as the Vice President for Operations for Millenium Partners Sports Club Management LLC, the parent company of Sports Club/LA and as president and general manager of the Boston Blazers of the National Lacrosse League.

== Education ==
Reffue was a standout collegiate soccer player for Colgate University from 1988 to 1992. He later enrolled in the Master of Business Administration program at Boston College graduating in 1995. He and Boston College professor Dr. Victoria L. Crittenden co-authored a paper entitled "Line Logic on the Bow Tie" for the Journal of Product and Brand Management (2006).

== Move to Professional Sports Management ==
After an early career in product and brand management for Polaroid, Brine Sports and Yankee Candle, Reffue was named president and General Manager of the National Lacrosse League's Boston Blazers on April 7, 2008. Prior to the 2011 NLL season, Reffue engineered several blockbuster signings for the Blazers, including the signing of former NLL MVP forward Casey Powell. In May 2013, he became an executive with Millenium Partners Sports Club Management LLC, responsible for the oversight of the company's luxury sports club brand Sports Club/LA.

On September 21, 2024, he was inducted into the Colgate University Athletics Hall of Honor.
