= Dan Teat =

Personal information
- Nationality: Scotland; Canada
- Born: December 9, 1971 (age 54) Brampton, Ontario, Canada
- Height: 5 ft 11 in (180 cm)
- Weight: 180 lb (82 kg; 12 st 12 lb)

Sport
- Position: Forward
- Shoots: Right
- NLL teams: Philadelphia Wings (2010); Edmonton Rush (2008-09); Buffalo Bandits (2005-08); San Jose Stealth (2004); Albany Attack (2001-03); Rochester Knighthawks (1997-2000)
- Pro career: 1997–2010

Dan Teat (born December 9, 1971) is a Scottish-Canadian professional box lacrosse coach and former player. He is currently a scout for the Buffalo Bandits of the National Lacrosse League. He is also the current head coach of the Brampton Excelsiors of Major Series Lacrosse. A native of Brampton, Ontario, Teat's long lacrosse career began when he was five years old in the Brampton Minor Lacrosse Association. He made his debut with the Brampton Jr. Excelsiors of the Ontario Junior A Lacrosse League in 1988, winning the league's rookie of the year award. Teat began playing for the Major Excelsiors of Major Series Lacrosse in 1993, once again winning his league's rookie of the year award. His association with the Excelsiors would last over two decades, and he was a forward on squads that won Mann Cup championships in 1993, 1998, 2002, 2008 and 2009.

Teat's 211-game MILL/NLL career began in 1997 with the Rochester Knighthawks, with whom he won the Champion's Cup in his rookie year. He was left unprotected in the 2001 Expansion Draft, and was picked up by the Columbus Landsharks, who promptly dealt him to the Albany Attack for Ken Montour and Mat Giles. He spent the next three years with the Attack in Albany, and moved with them as the club became the San Jose Stealth. Teat then moved on to the Buffalo Bandits, where he played from 2005 to the middle of the 2008 season when he was dealt, along with a second-round pick in the 2008 draft and a first-round pick in the 2009 draft, to the Edmonton Rush for Mike Accursi. Teat led the Rush in scoring in 2009, and was traded to the Philadelphia Wings for Derek Malawsky after the season. He spent 2010 with the Wings, and signed on with the Boston Blazers prior to the 2011 season. Teat joined the Blazers for the first week of training camp before announcing his retirement from the NLL. Teat also represented Scotland in the inaugural World Box Lacrosse Championship.

Since retiring from the playing turf, Teat has been the head coach of the Jr. A Excelsiors and the head coach of the Major Excelsiors, with whom he won a sixth Mann Cup in 2011. His 25-year association with the Excelsiors ended in 2013. Teat currently serves as an assistant coach with the Panthers. In the NLL, he also served as an assistant coach for the Buffalo Bandits and the Panther City Lacrosse Club.

His son Jeff is currently a professional lacrosse player for New York Atlas and the Ottawa Black Bears.
