= Jeff Moleski =

Canadian professional lacrosse player (born 1982)

Personal information
- Nationality: Canadian
- Born: February 3, 1982 (age 44) Prince George, British Columbia
- Height: 6 ft 1 in (185 cm)
- Weight: 205 lb (93 kg; 14 st 9 lb)

Sport
- Position: Defenseman
- Shoots: Left
- NLL draft: 34th overall, 2003; Calgary Roughnecks
- NLL team Former teams: Calgary Roughnecks; Washington Stealth; Vancouver Stealth
- Pro career: 2005–

Jeff Moleski (born February 3, 1982, in Prince George, British Columbia) is a Canadian professional box lacrosse player who plays for the Calgary Roughnecks in the National Lacrosse League. The Roughnecks drafted Moleski 34th overall in the 3rd round in the 2003 NLL entry draft. Jeffrey since played for Team Canada in the Czech Republic, contributing to bring home the gold. Prior to returning to the Roughnecks in 2015, he played for the Vancouver Stealth and formerly the Washington Stealth.

During the 2009 NLL season, he was named a reserve to the All-Star game.

== Statistics ==
=== NLL ===
Jeff Moleski		Regular season									Playoffs								
Season	Team	GP	G	A	Pts	LB	PIM	Pts/GP	LB/GP	PIM/GP	GP	G	A	Pts	LB	PIM	Pts/GP	LB/GP	PIM/GP
2005	Calgary Roughnecks	10	3	4	7	0	25	0.70	0.00	2.50	1	1	0	1	5	2	1.00	5.00	2.00
2006	Calgary Roughnecks	16	3	6	9	93	22	0.56	5.81	1.38	1	2	0	2	8	0	2.00	8.00	0.00
2007	Calgary Roughnecks	15	9	10	19	108	12	1.27	7.20	0.80	–	–	–	–	–	–	–	–	–
2008	Calgary Roughnecks	13	2	1	3	54	31	0.23	4.15	2.38	2	0	1	1	15	0	0.50	7.50	0.00
2009	Calgary Roughnecks	15	5	5	10	95	19	0.67	6.33	1.27	3	1	0	1	8	2	0.33	2.67	0.67
2010	Calgary Roughnecks	16	6	10	16	97	36	1.00	6.06	2.25	1	0	1	1	2	2	1.00	2.00	2.00
2011	Washington Stealth	16	3	10	13	74	22	0.81	4.63	1.38	3	1	0	1	12	2	0.33	4.00	0.67
2012	Washington Stealth	16	1	6	7	73	13	0.44	4.56	0.81	–	–	–	–	–	–	–	–	–
2013	Washington Stealth	11	5	8	13	66	21	1.18	6.00	1.91	3	1	2	3	17	4	1.00	5.67	1.33
2014	Vancouver Stealth	17	2	6	8	93	16	0.47	5.47	0.94	–	–	–	–	–	–	–	–	–
2015	Calgary Roughnecks	14	1	8	9	61	6	0.64	4.36	0.43	4	0	2	2	10	2	0.50	2.50	0.50
		159	40	74	114	814	223	0.72	5.12	1.40	18	6	6	12	77	14	0.67	4.28	0.78
Career Total:		177	46	80	126	891	237	0.71	5.03	1.34									

GP–Games played; G–Goals; A–Assists; Pts–Points; LB–Loose balls; PIM–Penalty minutes; Pts/GP–Points per games played; LB/GP–Loose balls per games played; PIM/GP–Penalty minutes per games played.
