= Brett Queener =

American lacrosse player (born 1984)

Personal information
- Nationality: American
- Born: September 30, 1984 (age 41) Penn Yan, New York, U.S.
- Height: 5 ft 10 in (178 cm)
- Weight: 180 lb (82 kg; 12 st 12 lb)

Sport
- Position: Goaltender (field) / Transition (box)
- Shoots: Left
- NLL team Former teams: Philadelphia Wings; Boston Blazers
- MLL teams: Florida Launch; New York Lizards; Hamilton Nationals; Rochester Rattlers
- Former NCAA team: University at Albany
- Pro career: 2008–

Brett Queener (born September 30, 1984 in Penn Yan, New York) is an American lacrosse player. He is currently a member of the Chrome Lacrosse Club in the Premier Lacrosse League and was selected by the Philadelphia Wings of the National Lacrosse League. He never played for them. Queener is best known as a field lacrosse goaltender, however he plays an offensive position in indoor box lacrosse. Queener is currently the head coach of the Community School of Naples varsity lacrosse team.

== Early years ==
Queener, a field lacrosse goaltender, began playing high-school varsity lacrosse for the Penn Yan Academy as an 8th grader. At Penn Yan, under his father and head coach Harry Queener, he helped the team capture five consecutive sectional titles. As a high school senior, Queener was recognized by US Lacrosse as an All-American.

== College career ==
After high school, Queener enrolled at Penn State University, but left due to being kicked out by the college. He then enrolled at Herkimer County Community College. While at Herkimer, Queener led the lacrosse team to the 2005 National Junior College Athletic Association national championship, and was named "National Junior College Player of the Year".

Queener transferred and joined the University at Albany Great Danes, an NCAA Division I collegiate lacrosse program in 2006. During his first game with the Great Dane's, against the Johns Hopkins Blue Jays, Queener ran the length of the field and scored a goal. He would accomplish this feat four more times during his career, setting a Division 1 lacrosse record for most career goals scored by a goal tender with five. While at Albany, he was named to the All-America East Conference team three times. In 2007, he led the Great Danes to the 2007 NCAA Division I Men's Lacrosse Championship tournament, advancing to the quarterfinals before losing, in overtime, to Cornell University. Even though Queener was the team's starting goaltender, during man-up situations he would come out of net, exchange his goaltender stick for a short crosse and play offense.

== MLL career ==
Queener was selected with the fifth-round selection (48th overall) by the Rochester Rattlers in Major League Lacrosse in the 2008 MLL Collegiate Draft. Queener was named Rookie of the Week in week 12 of the 2008 MLL season. He went on to help the Rattlers win their first Steinfeld Cup championship, splitting goaltender responsibilities with Mike Levin. With Levin starting the first half of the championship game, Queener came off the bench to play the second half. Making 10 saves, Queener also was involved in "highlight reel" clearings of the ball from the defensive end to the offensive side of the field. He was a factor on offensive plays, and assisted on one goal. His play was described by league MVP John Grant, Jr. as "a special half by a goaltender." In part due to this performance, Inside Lacrosse named Queener the "Lacrosse Personality of the Year." Prior to the 2014 season, he became a member of the Florida Launch, the first professional lacrosse team in Florida. During the second quarter of the game, Queener took a shot to his hand. He came out of the game, and the backup, Adam Fullerton, was put in. Queener came out after halftime with a sling on his arm. He needed an x-ray. The shot may have broken his hand.

== NLL career ==
Undrafted in the National Lacrosse League draft, Queener joined the expansion Boston Blazers as a free agent. As a field lacrosse goalkeeper, Queener attended the Blazers free agent camp attempting to make the team as a field player and not a goaltender (the skills required and the protective equipment worn by indoor, or box lacrosse goaltenders are very different from the field lacrosse goaltender). After attending a free agent camp, Queener was invited to participate in the Blazers regular camp. Prior to the season, the Blazers announced that Queener made the roster as a transition or forward player. In his first professional indoor lacrosse game, Queener recorded two assists and nine looseballs.

Queener played three seasons with the Blazers before the team folded in the summer of 2011. He was chosen in the fourth round of the resulting dispersal draft by the Philadelphia Wings.

== Personal ==
Queener comes from a lacrosse family. His father Harry is a lacrosse coach at Penn Yan Academy. His mother is also a coach of the girls team at the high school. His brother, Brice, is a former professional lacrosse player and currently a lacrosse coach. His older sister, Sarah, was a collegiate All-American and is current women's lacrosse head coach at Pomona-Pitzer Colleges. His younger sister, Sylvia, plays Division II women's lacrosse at Limestone College.

== Statistics ==
=== NLL ===
		Regular Season						Playoffs
Season	Team	GP	G	A	Pts	LB	PIM	GP	G	A	Pts	LB	PIM
2009	Boston	5	1	3	4	23	15	--	--	--	--	--	--
2010	Boston	13	6	11	17	51	21	1	0	0	0	0	2
2011	Boston	11	1	1	2	44	4	--	--	--	--	--	--
NLL totals		29	8	15	23	118	40	1	0	0	0	0	2
