= Sean Morris =

American lacrosse player

Personal information
- Nationality: American
- Born: September 10, 1982 (age 43) Marshfield, Massachusetts, U.S.
- Height: 5 ft 9 in (175 cm)
- Weight: 190 lb (86 kg; 13 st 8 lb)

Sport
- Position: Attack
- NLL draft: 77th overall, 2006; Colorado Mammoth
- NLL team Former teams: Boston Blazers; San Jose Stealth
- MLL team Former teams: Boston Cannons; Chicago Machine
- NCAA team: University of Massachusetts
- Pro career: 2006–

Sean Paul Morris (born September 10, 1983, in Marshfield, Massachusetts) is a professional lacrosse player with the Boston Cannons of the Major League Lacrosse, and the Boston Blazers in the National Lacrosse League. He founded Laxachusetts, Legacy Lacrosse, BostonLax.net and has recently launched TheLocker.com.

== Amateur career ==
Morris played collegiate lacrosse at University of Massachusetts. Morris initially enrolled at Rutgers University, but transferred and played his four years of eligibility at UMass. Morris lead the Minuteman to the NCAA Men's Lacrosse Championship game in 2006. He was awarded with back to back Eastern College Athletic Conference Player of the Year, and named New England Player of the Year in 2005 and 2006. Morris was also named as one of the five finalist for the Tewaaraton Trophy, awarded to the awarded "Most Outstanding" collegiate lacrosse player in the United States, in 2005 & 2006. In his Senior year, Sean was chosen for Faces in the Crowd by Sports Illustrated for leading the country in points per game.

In high school, Morris was a star running back. Morris was also recognized with the "Al Bundy Award" in 1999 Scoring 5 Touchdowns in one High School Game.

== Professional career ==
=== Major League Lacrosse ===
Morris was drafted in the First Round (3rd overall) in the 2006 MLL Collegiate Draft by the Major League Lacrosse's Chicago Machine. He played with the Machine during the 2006 and 2007 seasons. He was selected to the MLL All Star Team in 2006. In 2008, Morris was traded to his hometown Boston Cannons.

=== National Lacrosse League ===
Morris was selected by the Colorado Mammoth in the 2007 National Lacrosse League entry draft. Following the 2008 NLL expansion draft, Morris was traded with Casey Cittadino to the Boston Blazers for Brian Langtry. However, before the 2008 NLL season began, the Blazers announced that they would not play in the 2008 season. A dispersal draft was held, and Morris was chosen in the second round by the San Jose Stealth. In his Stealth debut, Morris recorded four points (2 goals, 2 assists), and was awarded "Rookie of the Week" honors.

=== Team USA ===
Morris was selected by the Team USA Indoor in the 2011 for World Games in Prague, Czech Republic. Finished 3rd on the Team in points while earning a bronze medal. Morris was selected by the Team USA Outdoor in the 2007 to play reigning National Champion Duke Blue Devils at Disney Wild World of Sports.

== Awards ==
- 2005 & 2006 Eastern College Athletic Conference Player of the Year
- 2005 & 2006 New England Player of the Year
- 2005 & 2006 Tewaaraton Trophy Finalist

== Statistics ==
=== University of Massachusetts ===
Season	GP	G	A	Pts	PPG
2006	18	33	39	72	--
2005	16	44	25	69	--
2004	9	7	17	24	--
2003	10	14	8	22	--
Totals	53	94	89	183	--
