= Angus Goodleaf =

Canadian lacrosse player

Personal information
- Nickname: Gus
- Nationality: Mohawk
- Born: March 6, 1987 (age 39) Kahnawake, Quebec, Canada
- Height: 6 ft 2 in (188 cm)
- Weight: 274 lb (124 kg; 19 st 8 lb)

Sport
- Position: Goaltender
- Shoots: Left
- NLL draft: 51st overall, 2007; Minnesota Swarm
- NLL team Former teams: Philadelphia Wings; Buffalo Bandits; Minnesota Swarm; Rochester Knighthawks
- Quebec Senior Lacrosse League team: Kahnawake Mohawks
- Pro career: 2007–

Angus Goodleaf (born March 6, 1987), is a Iroquois professional box lacrosse goaltender in the National Lacrosse League, currently playing for the Georgia Swarm (2024 and 2025 seasons) and for the Kahnawake Braves of the Major Series Lacrosse. He won back to back silver medals as a member of The Iroquois Nationals during the 2011 World Indoor Lacrosse Championship and the 2015 World Indoor Lacrosse Championship.

Awards

- Won 2013 NLL Champions Cup
- Won 2014 NLL Champions Cup
- Won 2010 Mann Cup
- Won 2011 Silver Medal at the World Indoor Lacrosse Championships
- Won 2015 Silver Medal at the World Indoor Lacrosse Championships
- Won 2015 Presidents Cup with Six Nations Rivermen
