= Chris Schiller =

American lacrosse player

Personal information
- Born: January 18, 1977 (age 48) Rochester, New York, US
- Height: 6 ft 0 in (183 cm)
- Weight: 185 lb (84 kg; 13 st 3 lb)

Sport
- Position: Transition
- Shoots: Right
- NLL team: Rochester Knighthawks
- MLL team: Toronto Nationals
- Pro career: 2001–

Chris Schiller (born January 18, 1977) was a lacrosse player for the Rochester Knighthawks in the National Lacrosse League. In 2006, he was named the team's Unsung Hero. Schiller also played for the Toronto Nationals of Major League Lacrosse (MLL).

Schiller was born in Rochester, New York. He works as an endoscopic account specialist for Johnson & Johnson. He majored in marketing at Penn State University, and is married to his wife Jennifer.
