= Michael Thompson (lacrosse) =

Canadian lacrosse player

Personal information
- Nationality: Iroquois
- Born: June 16, 1977 (age 49) Akwesasne, Ontario, Canada
- Height: 5 ft 10 in (178 cm)
- Weight: 240 lb (110 kg; 17 st 2 lb)

Sport
- Position: Goalie
- Shoots: Right
- NLL teams: Buffalo Bandits; Ottawa Rebel
- CLA teams: St. Regis Indians; Peterborough Lakers
- Pro career: 2001–2012

Michael "Mike" Thompson (b. on June 16, 1977 in Akwesasne, Ontario) is an Iroquois former professional box lacrosse goaltender. Thompson played seven seasons in the National Lacrosse League, six with the Buffalo Bandits.

He signed with the Bandits on August 18, 2006 to replace Ken Montour as back-up goalie to Steve Dietrich. Thompson took over the starting duties from Dietrich due to injuries during the 2007 season and played well enough to inevitably make Dietrich expendable after the season.

In 2008, Montour came back to Buffalo, he and Thompson formed a goalie platoon for the Bandits leading to the franchise's fourth NLL Championship. Thompson would make 39 saves, including one as time expired, as he went the whole way in the 2008 Champion's Cup.

Thompson retired from the NLL following the 2012 NLL season, although he was an unused backup for two games in 2014 for the Rochester Knighthawks.

== Statistics ==
=== NLL ===
		Regular Season						Playoffs
Season	Team	GP	Min	GA	Sv	GAA	Sv %	GP	Min	GA	Sv	GAA	Sv %
2001	Ottawa	8	38	21	27	32.76	56.25%	--	--	--	--	--	--
2007	Buffalo	16	511	103	324	12.08	75.88%	2	119	21	90	10.56	81.08%
2008	Buffalo	14	421	83	266	11.82	76.22%	3	120	25	85	12.50	77.27%
2009	Buffalo	16	313	66	208	12.63	75.91%	2	15	1	6	3.91	85.71%
2010	Buffalo	11	387	64	271	9.92	80.90%	1	55	13	29	14.18	69.05%
2011	Buffalo	16	763	123	450	9.67	78.53%	2	77	16	59	12.44	78.67%
2012	Buffalo	16	525	109	333	12.44	75.30%	1	0	0	0	--	--
NLL totals		97	2,960	569	1879	11.53	76.76%	11	387	76	269	11.78	77.97%
