= 2010 NLL season =

- League: National Lacrosse League
- Sport: Box lacrosse
- Duration: January 2010 – May 2010
- Games: 16
- Teams: 11

Draft
- Top draft pick: Sid Smith
- Picked by: Rochester Knighthawks

Regular season
- Top seed: Washington Stealth
- Season MVP: Casey Powell (Orlando Titans)
- Top scorer: Josh Sanderson (Calgary Roughnecks)

Playoffs
- Finals champions: Washington Stealth (1st title)
- Runners-up: Toronto Rock
- Finals MVP: Lewis Ratcliff (Stealth)

NLL seasons
- ← 2009 season 2011 season →

The 2010 National Lacrosse League season, the 24th in the history of the NLL, began on January 8, 2010, and ended with the Championship game on May 15.

== Team movement ==
After five seasons in San Jose, the Stealth announced shortly after the 2009 season ended that they would be relocating to Everett, Washington, approximately 30 miles north of Seattle. The Washington Stealth will play at the Comcast Arena. In addition it was announced on May 4, 2009, that after four seasons in Portland, the Lumberjax would no longer operate in that city and on July 7, 2009, the NLL held a dispersal draft for the Lumberjax players.

On August 10, 2009, it was announced that after three seasons in New York City, the Titans franchise will be relocating to Orlando, Florida, where they will become the Orlando Titans. The franchise will play its home games at Amway Arena.

=== Teams ===
2010 National Lacrosse League
Division	Team	City	Arena	Capacity
East	Boston Blazers	Boston, Massachusetts	TD Garden	17,850
East	Buffalo Bandits	Buffalo, New York	HSBC Arena	18,690
East	Orlando Titans	Orlando, Florida	Amway Arena	15,948
East	Philadelphia Wings	Philadelphia, Pennsylvania	Wachovia Center	19,537
East	Rochester Knighthawks	Rochester, New York	Blue Cross Arena	10,662
East	Toronto Rock	Toronto, Ontario	Air Canada Centre	18,800
West	Calgary Roughnecks	Calgary, Alberta	Pengrowth Saddledome	19,289
West	Colorado Mammoth	Denver, Colorado	Pepsi Center	18,007
West	Edmonton Rush	Edmonton, Alberta	Rexall Place	16,839
West	Minnesota Swarm	Saint Paul, Minnesota	XCEL Energy Center	18,064
West	Washington Stealth	Everett, Washington	Comcast Arena at Everett	8,513

=== Map of teams ===
East Division West Division

== Standings ==
East Division
P	Team	GP	W	L	PCT	GB	Home	Road	GF	GA	Diff	GF/GP	GA/GP
1	Orlando Titans – xy	16	11	5	.688	0.0	5–3	6–2	172	154	+18	10.75	9.62
2	Toronto Rock – x	16	9	7	.562	2.0	6–2	3–5	197	156	+41	12.31	9.75
3	Buffalo Bandits – x	16	8	8	.500	3.0	4–4	4–4	169	170	−1	10.56	10.62
4	Boston Blazers – x	16	8	8	.500	3.0	5–3	3–5	161	162	−1	10.06	10.12
5	Rochester Knighthawks	16	7	9	.438	4.0	4–4	3–5	155	181	−26	9.69	11.31
6	Philadelphia Wings	16	5	11	.312	6.0	3–5	2–6	168	194	−26	10.50	12.12

West Division
P	Team	GP	W	L	PCT	GB	Home	Road	GF	GA	Diff	GF/GP	GA/GP
1	Washington Stealth – xyz	16	11	5	.688	0.0	6–2	5–3	211	179	+32	13.19	11.19
2	Calgary Roughnecks – x	16	10	6	.625	1.0	5–3	5–3	193	169	+24	12.06	10.56
3	Edmonton Rush – x	16	10	6	.625	1.0	5–3	5–3	186	201	−15	11.62	12.56
4	Minnesota Swarm – x	16	5	11	.312	6.0	3–5	2–6	189	201	−12	11.81	12.56
5	Colorado Mammoth	16	4	12	.250	7.0	0–8	4–4	167	201	−34	10.44	12.56

x: Clinched playoff berth; c: Clinched playoff berth by crossing over to another division; y: Clinched division; z: Clinched best regular season record; GP: Games Played
W: Wins; L: Losses; GB: Games back; PCT: Win percentage; Home: Record at Home; Road: Record on the Road; GF: Goals scored; GA: Goals allowed
Differential: Difference between goals scored and allowed; GF/GP: Average number of goals scored per game; GA/GP: Average number of goals allowed per game

== Scoring leaders ==
Note: GP = Games played; G = Goals; A = Assists; Pts = Points; PIM = Penalty minutes; LB = Loose Balls

Player	Team	GP	G	A	Pts	PIM	LB
Josh Sanderson	Calgary Roughnecks	16	34	70	104	2	67
Lewis Ratcliff	Washington Stealth	16	46	51	97	4	63
Callum Crawford	Minnesota Swarm	16	32	64	96	2	68
Mark Steenhuis	Buffalo Bandits	16	36	54	90	27	99
Aaron Wilson	Minnesota Swarm	16	40	49	89	6	73
Dan Dawson	Boston Blazers	16	36	52	88	36	75
Rhys Duch	Washington Stealth	16	33	53	86	4	70
Colin Doyle	Toronto Rock	16	22	62	84	21	68
John Grant Jr.	Rochester Knighthawks	15	39	44	83	17	85
Ryan Benesch	Minnesota Swarm	16	28	55	83	2	85
Garrett Billings	Toronto Rock	16	33	50	83	2	56

== Leading goaltenders ==
Note: GP = Games played; Mins = Minutes played; W = Wins; L = Losses: GA = Goals Allowed; SV% = Save Percentage; GAA = Goals against average

Player	Team	GP	Mins	W	L	GA	SV%	GAA
Bob Watson	Toronto Rock	16	670	7	4	104	0.789	9.31
Anthony Cosmo	Boston Blazers	16	890	7	6	141	0.799	9.50
Matt Vinc	Orlando Titans	17	902	10	5	143	0.810	9.51
Mike Poulin	Calgary/Boston	17	404	5	3	66	0.784	9.79
Matt Roik	Washington Stealth	16	434	6	1	76	0.765	10.50

== Playoffs ==
Divisional Semifinal
E1	Orlando	12
E4	Boston	11
Eastern Division
E2	Toronto	13
E3	Buffalo	11
W1	Washington	14
W4	Minnesota	10
Western Division
W2	Calgary	7
W3	Edmonton	11

Divisional Final
E1	Orlando	10
E2	Toronto	15
W1	Washington	12
W3	Edmonton	11

Champion's Cup Final
E2	Toronto	11
W1	Washington	15

== Milestones and events ==
=== Pre-season ===
- June 17, 2009: The NLL announced that the San Jose Stealth would be relocating to Everett, Washington, playing at the Comcast Arena.
- June 30, 2009: The NLL announced that George Daniel had been named as Commissioner. Daniel had been Interim Commissioner since Jim Jennings' resignation in January.
- July 7, 2009: A dispersal draft was held for Portland Lumberjax players making the team officially defunct.
- August 10, 2009: The NLL announced that the New York Titans would be moving to Orlando, Florida, becoming the Orlando Titans.

== Awards ==
=== Annual ===
Award	Winner	Team
Most Valuable Player	Casey Powell	Orlando Titans
Goaltender of the Year	Matt Vinc	Orlando Titans
Defensive Player of the Year	Sandy Chapman	Toronto Rock
Transition Player of the Year	Brodie Merrill	Edmonton Rush
Rookie of the Year	Stephan LeBlanc	Toronto Rock
Sportsmanship Award	Shawn Williams	Rochester Knighthawks
GM of the Year	Derek Keenan	Edmonton Rush
Les Bartley Award	Derek Keenan; Chris Hall	Edmonton Rush; Washington Stealth
Executive of the Year Award	David Takata	Washington Stealth
Tom Borrelli Award	Paul Tutka	

=== All-Pro teams ===
First Team

- Casey Powell, Orlando
- Josh Sanderson, Calgary
- Dan Dawson, Boston
- Brodie Merrill, Edmonton
- Sandy Chapman, Toronto
- Matt Vinc, Orlando

Second Team

- Colin Doyle, Toronto
- Lewis Ratcliff, Washington
- Rhys Duch, Washington
- Jordan Hall, Orlando
- John Orsen, Orlando
- Anthony Cosmo, Boston

=== All-Rookie team ===
- Stephan Leblanc, Toronto
- Garrett Billings, Toronto
- Alex Gajic, Colorado
- Curtis Manning, Calgary
- Matt Beers, Washington
- Chris Corbeil, Buffalo

=== Weekly awards ===
The NLL gives out awards weekly for the best overall player, best offensive player, best transition player, best defensive player, and best rookie.

Month	Week	Overall	Offensive	Defensive	Transition	Rookie
January	1	Josh Sanderson	Josh Sanderson	Pat O'Toole	Paul Rabil	Garrett Billings
January	2	Colin Doyle	Colin Doyle	Brandon Miller	Bobby McBride	Ilija Gajic
January	3	Bob Watson	Lewis Ratcliff	Bob Watson	Paul Rabil	Garrett Billings
January	4	Aaron Bold	Jeff Zywicki	Greg Peyser	Brodie Merrill	Brett Mydske
February	5	Blaine Manning	Blaine Manning	Matt Vinc	Peter Morgan	Stephan LeBlanc
February	6	Mike Poulin	John Tavares	Angus Goodleaf	Jay Thorimbert	Stephan LeBlanc
February	7	Callum Crawford	Ryan Powell	Pat O'Toole	Steve Toll	Garrett Billings
March	8	Casey Powell	Casey Powell	Matt Vinc	Geoff Snider	Alex Gajic
March	9	Mark Steenhuis	Mark Steenhuis	Matt King	Jeff Shattler	Kyle Clancy
March	10	John Tavares	John Tavares	Matt Vinc	Jordan Hall	Alex Gajic
March	11	Dan Dawson	Dan Dawson	Anthony Cosmo	Jeff Shattler	Ryan Hotaling
March	12	Lewis Ratcliff	Lewis Ratcliff	Brandon Miller	Paul Rabil	Alex Gajic
April	13	Stephan LeBlanc	Callum Crawford	Brandon Atherton	Brodie Merrill	Stephan LeBlanc
April	14	Shawn Williams	Rhys Duch	Matt Roik	Jed Prossner	Chris Corbeil
April	15	Dan Dawson	Dan Dawson	Matt Vinc	Geoff Snider	Stephan LeBlanc
April	16	Rhys Duch	Rhys Duch	Mike Thompson	Jordan Hall	Kyle Clancy

=== Monthly awards ===
Awards are also given out monthly for the best overall player and best rookie.

Month	Overall	Rookie
January	Bob Watson	Garrett Billings
February	Matt Vinc	Stephan LeBlanc
March	John Tavares	Alex Gajic
April	Brodie Merrill	Stephan LeBlanc

== Statistics leaders ==
Bold numbers indicate new single-season records. Italics indicate tied single-season records.

Stat	Player	Team	Total
Goals	Lewis Ratcliff	Washington	46
Assists	Josh Sanderson	Boston	70
Points	Josh Sanderson	Boston	104
Penalty Minutes	Rory Smith	Orlando	104
Shots on Goal	John Grant, Jr.	Rochester	197
Loose Balls	Geoff Snider	Philadelphia	245
Save Pct	Matt Vinc	Rochester	.810
GAA	Mike Poulin	Calgary	8.99

== Attendance ==
=== Regular season ===
Home team	Home games	Average attendance	Total attendance
Buffalo Bandits	8	16,604	132,836
Colorado Mammoth	8	15,037	120,299
Calgary Roughnecks	8	10,418	83,349
Toronto Rock	8	10,066	80,532
Minnesota Swarm	8	9,588	76,706
Philadelphia Wings	8	9,458	75,664
Boston Blazers	8	8,309	66,478
Edmonton Rush	8	7,558	60,465
Rochester Knighthawks	8	7,129	57,037
Orlando Titans	8	7,035	56,283
Washington Stealth	8	3,944	31,559
**League**	**88**	**9,559**	**841,208**

=== Playoffs ===
Home team	Home games	Average attendance	Total attendance
Calgary Roughnecks	1	10,388	10,388
Toronto Rock	1	9,367	9,367
Washington Stealth	3	5,373	16,119
Orlando Titans	2	4,428	8,856
**League**	**7**	**6,390**	**44,730**

== See also ==
- 2010 in sports
