= Orlando Titans =

Disbanded professional lacrosse team

- Sport: Box lacrosse
- Disbanded: 2010
- League: National Lacrosse League
- Division: Eastern
- Team history: New York Titans (2006–2009)
- Based in: Orlando, Florida
- Arena: Amway Arena
- Colors: Orange, Blue
- Owner: Gary Rosenbach
- Head coach: Ed Comeau
- Manager: Ed Comeau
- Championships: 0
- Division titles: 1 (2010)

The Orlando Titans were a professional lacrosse team in the National Lacrosse League that played in the 2010 season. The Titans began as the New York Titans, and played for three seasons in New York before announcing the move to Orlando, Florida on August 10, 2009.

They played their first official game on January 8, 2010, versus the Philadelphia Wings. The Titans won 13–8.

In July 2010, the web site NLL Insider reported that the Titans would not participate in the 2011 season due to financial difficulties. Reportedly, several Titans players were applying to the league for free agency, based on non-payment of salary; any players not granted free agency will be dispersed to the other teams via a dispersal draft. In September 2010, it was reported in the Orlando Business Journal that the 2011 season had completely been canceled and that calls were placed to all season ticket holders to inform them. The Orlando Business Journal notes that the Titans' website has been taken down, phone lines have been disconnected, and no sources close to the team (along with the league itself) were aware of the shutdown; most fans are unlikely to receive a refund from the team.

== Awards and honors ==
Year	Player	Award
2010	Casey Powell	Most Valuable Player
2010	Matt Vinc	Goaltender of the Year

== All-time record ==
Season	Division	W–L	Finish	Win %	Home	Road	GF	GA	Coach	Playoffs
2010	Eastern	11–5	1st	.688	5–3	6–2	172	154	Ed Comeau	Lost East Division Finals
Total	1 Season	11–5		.688	5–3	6–2	172	154	1 coach	0 Championships
Playoff Totals	1 Appearance	1–1		.500	1–1	0–0	22	26	1 coach	0 Championships

== Playoff results ==
Season	Game	Visiting	Home
2010	East Division Semi-Finals	Boston 11	Orlando 12
2010	East Division Finals	Toronto 15	Orlando 10

== Draft history ==
=== NLL Entry Draft ===
First Round Selections

- 2009: None
- 2010: None
