= Boston Blazers (2009–2011) =

Former NLL professional box lacrosse team

- Sport: Box lacrosse
- Founded: 2007
- First season: 2009
- Disbanded: 2011
- League: National Lacrosse League
- Division: Eastern
- Based in: Boston, Massachusetts
- Arena: TD Garden
- Colors: Red, White, Black
- Owner: Tim Armstrong
- Head coach: Matt Sawyer
- General manager: Doug Reffue
- Championships: 0
- Playoff berths: 3 (2009, 2010, 2011)

The Boston Blazers were an indoor lacrosse team in the National Lacrosse League (NLL). The Blazers were based in Boston, Massachusetts, and began play in the 2009 NLL season.

The team was owned by Tim Armstrong, the former President of Advertising and Commerce for Google. NLL veteran Tom Ryan was the team's head coach until being dismissed on December 23, 2010. Ryan was replaced on December 28, 2010, by former Toronto Rock assistant coach Matt Sawyer. On April 7, 2008, the Blazers named veteran New England marketing executive Doug Reffue to the position of team president.

The team was not associated with the former Boston Blazers, who played in the Major Indoor Lacrosse League (MILL, predecessor to the NLL) from 1992 to 1997. However, the name was chosen "in part due to the popularity and nostalgia associated with the former Boston Blazers franchise".

On August 30, 2011, the team announced that it would be temporarily suspend operations for the 2012 season as they sought a new home facility for the 2013 season. However the team has yet to resume operations by 2025. The team was never reactivated and is considered folded.

== History ==
The Blazers were originally scheduled to begin play in the 2008 NLL season. On July 31, 2007, the league held an expansion draft and the Blazers selected a number of players. In preparation for the season, the team also made a number of trades. On October 16, 2007, the NLL announced that the 2008 season had been cancelled due to the failure of the league and the Professional Lacrosse Players' Association to reach a new collective bargaining agreement. However, the negotiations continued, and on October 25, the league announced that a new seven-year agreement had been reached, and that the season would be played. A new schedule was announced on November 2, 2007, but only included 12 of the expected 14 teams; the Blazers and the Arizona Sting had been removed. The reasons that the Blazers and Sting opted out of the season were not given, just that it was "due to a number of business issues", and that both teams would return in 2009. A dispersal draft was held on November 5, 2007.

== Inaugural season ==
The 2009 NLL season was the Boston Blazers' first season playing in the league. In order to field a team for the season, the Blazers participated in the three separate drafts: the Arizona Sting dispersal draft, the expansion draft on July 24, and the entry draft in September.

On June 30, in the Arizona Sting dispersal draft, the Blazers selected Dan Dawson first overall and forward Peter Veltman with the first pick of the second round. On July 24 the team picked 12 additional players for their roster in the 2008 expansion draft, including goaltender Mike Poulin with the first overall selection.

Player	Original Club	Position
Mike Poulin	Toronto Rock	Goaltender
Mitch Belisle	New York Titans	Defenseman
Matt Lyons	Rochester Knighthawks	Forward
Kyle Laverty	Buffalo Bandits	Defenseman
John Gallant	Colorado Mammoth	Defenseman
Jake Bergey	Philadelphia Wings	Forward
Devan Wray	Calgary Roughnecks	Defenseman
Kyle Ross	Minnesota Swarm	Defenseman
Tom Johnson	San Jose Stealth	Forward
Matt Holman	Chicago Shamrox	Forward
Michael Kilby	Portland LumberJax	Defenseman
Cam Bergman	Edmonton Rush	Transition

Shortly after the draft concluded, the Blazers traded Cam Bergman back to the Edmonton Rush for F Brenden Thenhaus and G Kurtis Wagar.

On July 29, the Blazers and Rochester Knighthawks swapped defenders, with Kyle Laverty going to Rochester in exchange for University of Massachusetts Amherst alum Jack Reid.

On July 30, the Blazers, San Jose Stealth, and Calgary Roughnecks completed a 3-way trade that sent Tom Johnson, Travis Gillespie, and Boston's 3rd-round pick in the 2009 NLL Entry Draft to San Jose, Devan Wray to Calgary, and forward Sean Morris (another UMass alum and Marshfield, MA native), defenseman Steve Panarelli, Calgary's 3rd-round pick in the 2009 NLL Entry Draft, and San Jose's 2nd-round pick in the 2010 NLL Entry Draft to Boston.

Only weeks before the season began, the Chicago Shamrox suspended operations, and another dispersal draft was held. The Blazers had the first overall pick, and chose former Goaltender of the Year Anthony Cosmo.

== Final roster ==
Final Boston Blazers roster
Active (21-man) roster		Inactive roster	Coaches
Goaltenders: 44 (Canada) Anthony Cosmo; 66 (Canada) Nick Rose; Defensemen: 85 (United States) Mitch Belisle; 12 (Canada) Jon "Bubba" Durno; 28 (Canada) Dilan Graham; 33 (Canada) Jon Harnett; 4 (Canada) Carter Livingstone; 15 (Canada) Curtis Ptolemy; 18 (United States) Jack Reid	Forwards: 22 (Canada) Bryan Bendig; 9 (Canada) Gary Bining; 6 (Canada) Dan Dawson (C); 8 (United States) Greg Downing; 19 (Canada) Matt Lyons; 17 (Canada) Geoff McNulty; 25 (United States) Sean Morris; 23 (United States) Brett Queener; Transition: 47 (Canada) Jason Bloom; 37 (Canada) Nick Cotter	Practice squad: 20 Travis Brown; 05 Paul Manesis	Head coach {{{Head Coach}}} Legend: * Suspended list; (C) Captain; (A) Alternate captain; Roster updated 2009-02-04; NLL Transactions

== All time record ==
Season	Division	W-L	Finish	Home	Road	GF	GA	Coach	Playoffs
2009	Eastern	10–6	3rd	4–4	6–2	181	168	Tom Ryan	Lost Division Semifinal
2010	Eastern	8–8	4th	5–3	3–5	161	162	Tom Ryan	Lost Division Semifinal
2011	Eastern	8–8	4th	5–3	3–5	166	155	Matt Sawyer	Lost Division Semifinal
Total	3 seasons	26–22		14–10	12–12	508	485		

== Playoff results ==
Season	Game	Visiting	Home
2009	Division Semifinal	Boston 8	Buffalo 11
2010	Division Semifinal	Boston 11	Orlando 12
2011	Division Semifinal	Boston 10	Buffalo 11

- National Lacrosse League
- Box lacrosse
- Lacrosse
- Boston Blazers (1992-1997)
- New England Blazers
- Boston Cannons

== Awards and honors ==
Year	Player	Award
2009	Dan Dawson	Most Valuable Player
2009	Dan Dawson	Sportsmanship Award

== Draft history ==
=== NLL Entry Draft ===
First Round Selections

- 2007: Craig Point (3rd overall), Matt Lyons (11th overall)
- 2008: Daryl Veltman (1st overall)
- 2009: Max Seibald (8th overall)
- 2010: Kyle Rubisch (2nd overall), David Brock (7th overall)
- 2011: None
