= Washington Stealth =

Lacrosse team in Washington, 2009 to 2013

- Sport: Box lacrosse
- Founded: 2009
- League: National Lacrosse League
- Division: Western
- Team history: Albany Attack (2000–2003); San Jose Stealth (2004–2009)
- Based in: Everett, Washington
- Arena: Xfinity Arena
- Colors: Red, Black, Silver
- Owner: Bill Watkins and Denise Watkins
- Head coach: Chris Hall
- General manager: Doug Locker
- Championships: 1 (2010)
- Division titles: 1 (2010)
- Local media: Fox Sports Net Northwest; Everett Herald; Seattle Times; KONG
- Formerly: San Jose Stealth; Albany Attack
- Later: Vancouver Warriors (2018–present)

The Washington Stealth were a member of the National Lacrosse League, the professional box lacrosse league of North America from the 2010 NLL season through the 2013 NLL season. They were based in Everett (part of the Seattle metropolitan area), with home games played at the 8,513-seat Comcast Arena at Everett.

The team was previously known as the Albany Attack from 2000 until 2003, and later the San Jose Stealth from 2004 until 2009.

On July 24, 2012, the Stealth and Comcast Arena announced that they had agreed to new terms on a five-year lease that will keep the team in Everett through the 2017 season.

On June 27, 2013, it was announced that the team was moving to Langley, British Columbia for the 2014 NLL season, and would continue to use the Stealth name. In 2018, the franchise was purchased by Canucks Sports & Entertainment who announced they would be called the Vancouver Warriors.

== All-time record ==
Season	Division	W-L	Finish	Home	Road	GF	GA	Coach	Playoffs
2010	Western	11–5	1st	6–2	5–3	211	179	Chris Hall	Won NLL Championship
2011	Western	8–8	3rd	3–5	5–3	203	198	Chris Hall	Lost NLL Championship
2012	Western	4–12	5th	2–6	2–6	179	204	Art Webster (interim)	Did not qualify
2013	Western	9–7	2nd	5–3	4–4	193	192	Chris Hall	Lost NLL Championship
Total	4 seasons	32–32		16–16	16–16	786	773		
Playoff totals	3 Appearances	7–2		4–1	3–1	108	91	1 Championship	

== Playoff results ==
Season	Game	Visiting	Home
2010	Division Semifinal	Minnesota 10	Washington 14
2010	Division Final	Edmonton 11	Washington 12
2010	Championship	Toronto 11	Washington 15
2011	Division Semifinal	Washington 14	Minnesota 8
2011	Division Final	Washington 10	Calgary 8
2011	Championship	Washington 7	Toronto 8
2013	Division Semifinal	Edmonton 11	Washington 12
2013	Division Final	Washington 14	Calgary 13
2013	Championship	Rochester 11	Washington 10

== Awards and honors ==
Season	Player	Award
2010	Chris Hall	Les Bartley Award
2010	David Takata	Executive of the Year
2013	Doug Locker	GM of the Year

Preceded by Calgary Roughnecks	National Lacrosse League Champions; 2010	Succeeded by Toronto Rock
