= 2010 Colorado Mammoth season =

2010 Colorado Mammoth
- League: NLL
- Division: 5th West
- 2010 record: 4-12
- Home record: 0-8
- Road record: 4-4
- Goals for: 167
- Goals against: 201
- General Manager: Steve Govett
- Coach: Bob Hamley
- Captain: John Gallant
- Alternate captains: Bruce Murray; Nick Carlson
- Arena: Pepsi Center

Team leaders
- Goals: Jamie Shewchuk (31)
- Assists: Brian Langtry (41)
- Points: Jamie Shewchuk (66)
- Penalties in minutes: Ryan McFayden (52)
- Loose Balls: Jamie Shewchuk (83)
- Wins: Chris Levis (2); Andrew Leyshon (2)
- Goals against average: Curtis Palidwor (11.33)

The Colorado Mammoth are a lacrosse team based in Denver, Colorado playing in the National Lacrosse League (NLL). The 2010 season will be the 24th in franchise history and 8th as the Mammoth (previously the Washington Power, Pittsburgh Crossefire, and Baltimore Thunder).

On January 19, after an 0-2 start, head coach Bob McMahon was fired and replaced on an interim basis by team president and general manager Steve Govett. After bring brought on as an assistant coach in late February, Bob Hamley was made head coach on March 22. Hamley luck wasn't much better, as the Mammoth finished 4-12 (including 0-8 at home) and out of the playoffs.

== Regular season ==
=== Conference standings ===
East Division
P	Team	GP	W	L	PCT	GB	Home	Road	GF	GA	Diff	GF/GP	GA/GP
1	Orlando Titans – xy	16	11	5	.688	0.0	5–3	6–2	172	154	+18	10.75	9.62
2	Toronto Rock – x	16	9	7	.562	2.0	6–2	3–5	197	156	+41	12.31	9.75
3	Buffalo Bandits – x	16	8	8	.500	3.0	4–4	4–4	169	170	−1	10.56	10.62
4	Boston Blazers – x	16	8	8	.500	3.0	5–3	3–5	161	162	−1	10.06	10.12
5	Rochester Knighthawks	16	7	9	.438	4.0	4–4	3–5	155	181	−26	9.69	11.31
6	Philadelphia Wings	16	5	11	.312	6.0	3–5	2–6	168	194	−26	10.50	12.12

West Division
P	Team	GP	W	L	PCT	GB	Home	Road	GF	GA	Diff	GF/GP	GA/GP
1	Washington Stealth – xyz	16	11	5	.688	0.0	6–2	5–3	211	179	+32	13.19	11.19
2	Calgary Roughnecks – x	16	10	6	.625	1.0	5–3	5–3	193	169	+24	12.06	10.56
3	Edmonton Rush – x	16	10	6	.625	1.0	5–3	5–3	186	201	−15	11.62	12.56
4	Minnesota Swarm – x	16	5	11	.312	6.0	3–5	2–6	189	201	−12	11.81	12.56
5	Colorado Mammoth	16	4	12	.250	7.0	0–8	4–4	167	201	−34	10.44	12.56

x: Clinched playoff berth; c: Clinched playoff berth by crossing over to another division; y: Clinched division; z: Clinched best regular season record; GP: Games Played
W: Wins; L: Losses; GB: Games back; PCT: Win percentage; Home: Record at Home; Road: Record on the Road; GF: Goals scored; GA: Goals allowed
Differential: Difference between goals scored and allowed; GF/GP: Average number of goals scored per game; GA/GP: Average number of goals allowed per game

=== Game log ===
Game	Date	Opponent	Location	Score	OT	Attendance	Record
1	January 9, 2010	@ Washington Stealth	Comcast Arena at Everett	L 8–17		4,737	0–1
2	January 16, 2010	Edmonton Rush	Pepsi Center	L 13–14		15,178	0–2
3	January 22, 2010	@ Minnesota Swarm	Xcel Energy Center	W 15–14	OT	8,648	1–2
4	January 23, 2010	@ Philadelphia Wings	Wachovia Center	W 12–11	OT	8,201	2–2
5	January 30, 2010	Washington Stealth	Pepsi Center	L 11–12		15,242	2–3
6	February 5, 2010	Orlando Titans	Pepsi Center	L 5–12		13,953	2–4
7	February 20, 2010	@ Minnesota Swarm	Xcel Energy Center	L 5–15		9,223	2–5
8	February 27, 2010	Minnesota Swarm	Pepsi Center	L 12–13		15,427	2–6
9	March 13, 2010	Edmonton Rush	Pepsi Center	L 9–13		14,566	2–7
10	March 26, 2010	Washington Stealth	Pepsi Center	L 14–15		15,102	2–8
11	March 27, 2010	@ Washington Stealth	Comcast Arena at Everett	L 9–12		5,808	2–9
12	April 3, 2010	@ Buffalo Bandits	HSBC Arena	W 12–11	OT	16,951	3–9
13	April 9, 2010	@ Edmonton Rush	Rexall Place	W 14–10		7,493	4–9
14	April 10, 2010	@ Calgary Roughnecks	Pengrowth Saddledome	L 11–12		12,321	4–10
15	April 16, 2010	Boston Blazers	Pepsi Center	L 7–9		15,104	4–11
16	April 23, 2010	Calgary Roughnecks	Pepsi Center	L 10–11		15,727	4–12

== Transactions ==
=== Trades ===
July 9, 2009	To Colorado Mammoth Ryan Powell	To New York Titans Matt Danowski
September 3, 2009	To Colorado Mammoth Sixth round pick, 2010 entry draft	To Philadelphia Wings Mike Ward
October 31, 2009	To Colorado Mammoth Ilija Gajic; First round selection, 2012 entry draft	To Rochester Knighthawks Gavin Prout; Andrew Potter; 2 First round selections, 2010 entry draft
November 30, 2009	To Colorado Mammoth Callum Crawford	To Edmonton Rush Ryan Powell
November 30, 2009	To Colorado Mammoth Chad Culp	To Minnesota Swarm Callum Crawford
February 3, 2010	To Colorado Mammoth Chris Levis	To Minnesota Swarm Second round selection, 2011 entry draft

=== Entry draft ===
The 2009 NLL Entry Draft took place on September 9, 2009. The Mammoth selected the following players:

Round	Overall	Player	College/Club
1	4	Cliff Smith	Denver University
1	5	Alex Gajic	Denver University
2	17	Brad Richardson	Denver University
3	32	Shaun Dhaliwal	Burnaby, BC
4	35	Ryan McFadyen	Duke University
5	46	Ben Davies	New Westminster, BC
6	55	Neil Tyacke	New Westminster, BC
6	56	Rocco Romero	Cornell University

== Roster ==
2010 Colorado Mammoth roster
Active (21-man) roster		Inactive roster	Coaches
Goaltenders: 30 (Canada) Chris Levis; 41 (Canada) Andrew Leyshon; Defensemen: 48 (Canada) Rich Catton; 28 (United States) Tom Ethington; 14 (United States) Steve Forsythe; 11 (Canada) John Gallant (C); 24 (United States) Ryan McFadyen; 36 (Canada) Chris McKay; 20 (Canada) Bruce Murray (A)	Forwards: 91 (Canada) Cory Conway; 7 (Canada) Chad Culp; 77 (Canada) Shaun Dhaliwal; 65 (Canada) Jamie Floris; 10 (Canada) Alex Gajic; 9 (Canada) Ilija Gajic; 6 (United States) Brian Langtry; 18 (Canada) Derek Malawsky; 1 (United States) Jed Prossner; 85 (Canada) Jamie Shewchuk; 27 (Canada) Cliff Smith; Transition: 8 (Canada) Nick Carlson (A); 19 (Canada) Nenad Gajic; 18 (Canada) Brad Richardson	Practice squad: 88 (Canada) Neil Tyacke; 74 (United States) Kevin Unterstein; Injured reserve: 26 (Canada) Matt Wilson; Unable to play: 44 (Canada) Dan Carey; 38 (Canada) Gee Nash	Head coach {{{Head Coach}}} Legend: * Suspended list; (C) Captain; (A) Alternate captain; Roster updated 2010-04-24; NLL Transactions

== See also ==
- 2010 NLL season
