= 2026 Vancouver Warriors season =

Canadian lacrosse team season

2026 Vancouver Warriors
- League: NLL
- 2026 record: 13–5
- Home record: 6–3
- Road record: 7–2
- Goals for: 200
- Goals against: 170
- General Manager: Curt Malawsky
- Coach: Curt Malawsky
- Captain: Brett Mydske
- Alternate captains: Keegan Bal (home); Matt Beers (home); Reid Bowering (away); Ryan Dilks (away)
- Arena: Rogers Arena
- Average attendance: 9,690

Team leaders
- Goals: Keegan Bal (45)
- Assists: Keegan Bal (79)
- Points: Keegan Bal (124)
- Penalties in minutes: Jackson Suboch (45)
- Loose Balls: Reid Bowering (111)
- Wins: Christian Del Bianco (13)
- Goals against average: Christian Del Bianco (9.42)

The Vancouver Warriors are a professional lacrosse team based in Vancouver, British Columbia. The team plays in the National Lacrosse League (NLL). The 2026 season was the 26th in franchise history and the 12th season in Vancouver. The franchise previously played in Everett, Washington, San Jose, and Albany, New York.

== Regular season ==
=== Current standings ===
| P | Team | GP | W | L | PCT | GB | Home | Road | GF | GA | Diff | GF/GP | GA/GP |
|---|---|---|---|---|---|---|---|---|---|---|---|---|---|
| 1 | Vancouver Warriors – xz | 18 | 13 | 5 | .722 | 0.0 | 6–3 | 7–2 | 200 | 170 | +30 | 11.11 | 9.44 |
| 2 | Colorado Mammoth – x | 18 | 12 | 6 | .667 | 1.0 | 7–2 | 5–4 | 206 | 179 | +27 | 11.44 | 9.94 |
| 3 | Saskatchewan Rush – x | 18 | 12 | 6 | .667 | 1.0 | 7–2 | 5–4 | 206 | 176 | +30 | 11.44 | 9.78 |
| 4 | Georgia Swarm – x | 18 | 12 | 6 | .667 | 1.0 | 5–4 | 7–2 | 193 | 156 | +37 | 10.72 | 8.67 |
| 5 | Buffalo Bandits – x | 18 | 11 | 7 | .611 | 2.0 | 6–3 | 5–4 | 199 | 183 | +16 | 11.06 | 10.17 |
| 6 | Toronto Rock – x | 18 | 11 | 7 | .611 | 2.0 | 6–3 | 5–4 | 195 | 186 | +9 | 10.83 | 10.33 |
| 7 | San Diego Seals – x | 18 | 8 | 10 | .444 | 5.0 | 3–6 | 5–4 | 185 | 191 | −6 | 10.28 | 10.61 |
| 8 | Halifax Thunderbirds – x | 18 | 8 | 10 | .444 | 5.0 | 4–5 | 4–5 | 187 | 182 | +5 | 10.39 | 10.11 |
| 9 | Las Vegas Desert Dogs | 18 | 8 | 10 | .444 | 5.0 | 6–3 | 2–7 | 219 | 229 | −10 | 12.17 | 12.72 |
| 10 | Ottawa Black Bears | 18 | 8 | 10 | .444 | 5.0 | 4–5 | 4–5 | 185 | 203 | −18 | 10.28 | 11.28 |
| 11 | Calgary Roughnecks | 18 | 6 | 12 | .333 | 7.0 | 3–6 | 3–6 | 187 | 205 | −18 | 10.39 | 11.39 |
| 12 | Rochester Knighthawks | 18 | 6 | 12 | .333 | 7.0 | 3–6 | 3–6 | 205 | 239 | −34 | 11.39 | 13.28 |
| 13 | Oshawa FireWolves | 18 | 6 | 12 | .333 | 7.0 | 4–5 | 2–7 | 179 | 212 | −33 | 9.94 | 11.78 |
| 14 | Philadelphia Wings | 18 | 5 | 13 | .278 | 8.0 | 3–6 | 2–7 | 165 | 200 | −35 | 9.17 | 11.11 |

=== Regular season ===
| Game | Date | Opponent | Location | Score | OT | Attendance | Record |
|---|---|---|---|---|---|---|---|
| 1 | November 29, 2025 | Colorado Mammoth | Rogers Arena | L 7–10 | | 9,219 | 0–1 |
| 2 | December 13, 2025 | Las Vegas Desert Dogs | Rogers Arena | W 15–9 | | 9,669 | 1–1 |
| 3 | December 19, 2025 | @ Oshawa FireWolves | Tribute Communities Centre | W 8–6 | | 4,852 | 2–1 |
| 4 | January 9, 2026 | @ Calgary Roughnecks | Scotiabank Saddledome | W 11–10 | | 8,799 | 3–1 |
| 5 | January 16, 2026 | San Diego Seals | Rogers Arena | L 9–11 | | 10,971 | 3–2 |
| 6 | January 23, 2026 | @ Ottawa Black Bears | Canadian Tire Centre | W 12–8 | | 4,129 | 4–2 |
| 7 | January 31, 2026 | @ Rochester Knighthawks | Blue Cross Arena | W 16–6 | | 4,945 | 5–2 |
| 8 | February 7, 2026 | Rochester Knighthawks | Rogers Arena | W 16–15 | | 9,349 | 6–2 |
| 9 | February 14, 2026 | @ Saskatchewan Rush | SaskTel Centre | L 8–9 | | 7,319 | 6–3 |
| 10 | February 20, 2026 | Buffalo Bandits | Rogers Arena | W 11–9 | | 9,392 | 7–3 |
| 11 | February 27, 2026 | @ Las Vegas Desert Dogs | Lee's Family Forum | W 14–10 | | 4,499 | 8–3 |
| 12 | March 1, 2026 | @ San Diego Seals | Pechanga Arena | W 9–7 | | 5,784 | 9–3 |
| 13 | March 6, 2026 | Toronto Rock | Rogers Arena | L 10–13 | | 9,747 | 9–4 |
| 14 | March 14, 2026 | @ Georgia Swarm | Gas South Arena | W 14–7 | | 4,929 | 10–4 |
| 15 | March 20, 2026 | Ottawa Black Bears | Rogers Arena | W 10–8 | | 10,003 | 11–4 |
| 16 | April 4, 2026 | @ Buffalo Bandits | KeyBank Center | L 5–15 | | 17,350 | 11–5 |
| 17 | April 10, 2026 | Halifax Thunderbirds | Rogers Arena | W 8–7 | | 9,234 | 12–5 |
| 18 | April 18, 2026 | Philadelphia Wings | Rogers Arena | W 17–10 | | 9,630 | 13–5 |

=== Playoffs ===
| Game | Date | Opponent | Location | Score | OT | Attendance | Record |
|---|---|---|---|---|---|---|---|
| Quarterfinals | April 24, 2026 | Halifax Thunderbirds | Rogers Arena | L 7–10 | | 9,073 | 0–1 |

== Roster ==
Vancouver Warriors roster
| Active (21-man) roster | | Inactive roster | Coaches |
|---|---|---|---|
| Goaltenders: 35 (Canada) Christian Del Bianco; 39 (Canada) Connor O'Toole; Defencemen: 2 (Canada) Matt Beers (A); 28 (Canada) Reid Bowering (A); 11 (Canada) Reece Callies; 18 (Canada) Steph Charbonneau; 13 (Canada) Jeff Cornwall; 24 (Canada) Ryan Dilks (A); 15 (Canada) Tyler Garrison; 12 (Canada) Brett Mydske (C); 88 (Canada) Remo Schenato; 37 (Canada) Jackson Suboch; 20 (Canada) Nathan Miller | Forwards: 45 (Canada) Keegan Bal (A); 8 (Canada) Adam Charalambides; 42 (Canada) Payton Cormier; 17 (Canada) Curtis Dickson; 19 (Canada) Jesse King; 14 (Canada) Marcus Klarich; 96 (Canada) Ryan Martel; 91 (Canada) Ryan Sheridan; Transition: 16 (Canada) Owen Grant; 22 (Canada) Shane Simpson; 73 (United States) Alec Stathakis; 74 (Canada) Ethan Ticehurst | | Head coach: Curt Malawsky; Assistant coaches: Bob McMahon (offence); Rob Williams (defence); Tyler Richards (player development); Grant Coghill (video); Legend: * Suspended list; (C) Captain; (A) Alternate captain; Roster updated NLL Transactions |

=== Entry Draft ===
The 2025 NLL Entry Draft took place on September 6, 2025.

The Vancouver Warriors selected:

| Round | Overall | Player | Position | Year of Birth | College/Club |
|---|---|---|---|---|---|
| 2 | 19 | Mic Kelly | transition | 2002 | University of Denver |
| 2 | 31 | Nathan Miller | defence | 2004 | Coquitlam Adanacs Jr. A (BCJALL) |
| 4 | 58 | Jaden Laberge | defence | 2004 | Delta Islanders Jr. A (BCJALL) |
| 5 | 72 | Ben Gagnon | defence/transition | 2004 | Langley Thunder Jr. A (BCJALL) |
| 6 | 86 | Boris Maksimenko | goaltender | 2007 | New Westminster Salmonbellies Jr. A (BCJALL) |
