= 2025 Vancouver Warriors season =

Professional lacrosse team

2025 Vancouver Warriors
- League: NLL
- 2025 record: 11–7
- Home record: 7–2
- Road record: 4–5
- Goals for: 196
- Goals against: 172
- General Manager: Curt Malawsky
- Coach: Curt Malawsky
- Captain: Brett Mydske
- Alternate captains: Keegan Bal (home); Matt Beers (home); Reid Bowering (away); Ryan Dilks (away)
- Arena: Rogers Arena
- Average attendance: 9,677

Team leaders
- Goals: Keegan Bal (43)
- Assists: Keegan Bal (68)
- Points: Keegan Bal (111)
- Penalties in minutes: Jackson Suboch (55)
- Loose Balls: Alec Stathakis (137)
- Wins: Christian Del Bianco (6)
- Goals against average: Connor O'Toole (5.93)

The Vancouver Warriors are a professional lacrosse team based in Vancouver, British Columbia. The team plays in the National Lacrosse League (NLL). The 2025 season was the 25th in franchise history and the 11th season in Vancouver. The franchise previously played in Everett, Washington, San Jose, and Albany, New York.

The franchise qualified for the playoffs for the first time since 2017, and the first time since their 2018 rebrand and move to Rogers Arena.

== Regular season ==
=== Final standings ===
P	Team	GP	W	L	PCT	GB	Home	Road	GF	GA	Diff	GF/GP	GA/GP
1	Buffalo Bandits – xz	18	13	5	.722	0.0	6–3	7–2	242	195	+47	13.44	10.83
2	Saskatchewan Rush – x	18	13	5	.722	0.0	6–3	7–2	213	179	+34	11.83	9.94
3	Halifax Thunderbirds – x	18	11	7	.611	2.0	6–3	5–4	239	213	+26	13.28	11.83
4	Vancouver Warriors – x	18	11	7	.611	2.0	7–2	4–5	196	172	+24	10.89	9.56
5	Rochester Knighthawks – x	18	10	8	.556	3.0	4–5	6–3	228	209	+19	12.67	11.61
6	Calgary Roughnecks – x	18	10	8	.556	3.0	3–6	7–2	219	209	+10	12.17	11.61
7	Georgia Swarm – x	18	9	9	.500	4.0	4–5	5–4	214	217	−3	11.89	12.06
8	San Diego Seals – x	18	9	9	.500	4.0	6–3	3–6	215	209	+6	11.94	11.61
9	Ottawa Black Bears	18	8	10	.444	5.0	4–5	4–5	183	202	−19	10.17	11.22
10	Colorado Mammoth	18	8	10	.444	5.0	4–5	4–5	195	212	−17	10.83	11.78
11	Albany FireWolves	18	7	11	.389	6.0	5–4	2–7	192	209	−17	10.67	11.61
12	Philadelphia Wings	18	7	11	.389	6.0	4–5	3–6	207	231	−24	11.50	12.83
13	Toronto Rock	18	6	12	.333	7.0	2–7	4–5	189	208	−19	10.50	11.56
14	Las Vegas Desert Dogs	18	4	14	.222	9.0	2–7	2–7	189	256	−67	10.50	14.22

=== Regular season ===
Game	Date	Opponent	Location	Score	OT	Attendance	Record
1	November 29, 2024	@ Colorado Mammoth	Ball Arena	L 7–11		10,245	0–1
2	December 13, 2024	Rochester Knighthawks	Rogers Arena	W 10–7		9,934	1–1
3	December 28, 2024	@ Calgary Roughnecks	Scotiabank Saddledome	W 14–10		13,094	2–1
4	January 10, 2025	San Diego Seals	Rogers Arena	W 11–9		9,551	3–1
5	January 17, 2025	@ Ottawa Black Bears	Canadian Tire Centre	L 8–9		5,217	3–2
6	January 20, 2025	@ Philadelphia Wings	Wells Fargo Center	L 13–14		5,101	3–3
7	January 24, 2025	Ottawa Black Bears	Rogers Arena	W 8–4		8,887	4–3
8	January 31, 2025	@ Halifax Thunderbirds	Scotiabank Centre	L 9–10		8,453	4–4
9	February 7, 2025	Calgary Roughnecks	Rogers Arena	L 12–15		9,375	4–5
10	February 14, 2025	@ Las Vegas Desert Dogs	Lee's Family Forum	W 12–8		4,925	5–5
11	February 21, 2025	Saskatchewan Rush	Rogers Arena	L 7–10		9,551	5–6
12	March 7, 2025	@ San Diego Seals	Pechanga Arena	L 11–13		4,154	5–7
13	March 14, 2025	Toronto Rock	Rogers Arena	W 13–8		9,990	6–7
14	March 22, 2025	Georgia Swarm	Rogers Arena	W 15–13		9,435	7–7
15	March 29, 2025	@ Buffalo Bandits	KeyBank Center	W 13–12		19,070	8–7
16	April 4, 2025	Albany FireWolves	Rogers Arena	W 10–4		9,492	9–7
17	April 11, 2025	@ Toronto Rock	Paramount Fine Foods Centre	W 12–10		5,014	10–7
18	April 19, 2025	Philadelphia Wings	Rogers Arena	W 11–5		10,876	11–7

=== Playoffs ===
Game	Date	Opponent	Location	Score	OT	Attendance	Record
Quarterfinals	April 26, 2025	Rochester Knighthawks	Rogers Arena	W 15–10		8,164	1–0
Semifinals (game 1)	May 2, 2025	@ Buffalo Bandits	KeyBank Center	L 3–9		14,415	1–1
Semifinals (game 2)	May 4, 2025	Buffalo Bandits	Rogers Arena	L 9–11		9,176	1–2

== Roster ==
Vancouver Warriors roster
Active (21-man) roster		Inactive roster	Coaches
Goaltenders: 35 (Canada) Christian Del Bianco; 39 (Canada) Connor O'Toole; Defencemen: 2 (Canada) Matt Beers (A); 28 (Canada) Reid Bowering (A); 19 (Canada) Steph Charbonneau; 13 (Canada) Jeff Cornwall; 24 (Canada) Ryan Dilks (A); 51 (Canada) Tyson Kirkness; 12 (Canada) Brett Mydske (C); 88 (Canada) Remo Schenato; 37 (Canada) Jackson Suboch; 17 (Canada) Chris Willman	Forwards: 45 (Canada) Keegan Bal (A); 8 (Canada) Adam Charalambides; 42 (Canada) Payton Cormier; 21 (Canada) Kevin Crowley; 10 (Canada) Riley Loewen; 96 (Canada) Ryan Martel; 47 (Canada) Dylan McIntosh; 91 (Canada) Ryan Sheridan; Transition: 16 (Canada) Owen Grant; 14 (Canada) Marcus Klarich; 73 (United States) Alec Stathakis		Head coach: Curt Malawsky; Assistant coaches: Bob McMahon (offence); Rob Williams (defence); Tyler Richards (player development); Grant Coghill (video); Legend: * Suspended list; (C) Captain; (A) Alternate captain; Roster updated NLL Transactions

=== Entry Draft ===
The 2024 NLL Entry Draft took place on September 15, 2024.

The Vancouver Warriors selected:

Round	Overall	Player	Position	Year of Birth	College/Club
1	4	Johnathan Peshko	forward	2001	Johns Hopkins University
1	6	Remo Schenato	defence	2003	Coquitlam Adanacs Jr. A (BCJALL)
3	32	Rhys Porteous	forward	2002	Manhattan University
3	41	Josh Carlson	forward	2002	University of Denver
5	61	Kai George	defence	2002	Lewis University
6	76	Cole Kastner	defence	2002	University of Virginia
