= National Lacrosse League dispersal draft =

Draft type in the NLL

The National Lacrosse League dispersal draft is a meeting where the general managers of National Lacrosse League teams choose players from teams that are ceasing operations. The NLL has seen many team changes over the years (the 1993 season was the last time the league had no team changes over the previous season), so dispersal drafts have been commonplace. Recent dispersal drafts have occurred in 2026 (Ottawa Black Bears, Philadelphia Wings), 2024 (Panther City Lacrosse Club), 2011 (Boston Blazers), 2010 (Orlando Titans), 2009 (Portland LumberJax), 2008 (Arizona Sting, Chicago Shamrox), 2007 (Arizona Sting, Boston Blazers), 2005 (Anaheim Storm), 2004 (Vancouver Ravens), 2003 (Ottawa Rebel), and 2002 (Montréal Express).

== 2026 Draft results ==
Players from the Ottawa Black Bears and Philadelphia Wings - September 15, 2026

Overall	Team	Player
First Round
1	Oshawa	Jeff Teat
2	Las Vegas	Nick Damude
3	Rochester	Callum Jones
4	Georgia (from Calgary)	Lukas Nielsen
5	San Diego	Brennan O'Neill
6	Halifax	Matt Marinier
7	Colorado	Alex Pace
8	Georgia	Deacon Knott
9	Buffalo	Zach Higgins
10	Saskatchewan	Jake Stevens
11	Buffalo (from Vancouver)	Dalton Young
12	Las Vegas (from Toronto)	Mitchell Armstrong
Second Round
13	Oshawa	Connor Kearnan
14	Las Vegas	Sam Leclair
15	Rochester	Brent Noseworthy
16	Calgary	Ben Kromer
17	San Diego	Jake Saunders
18	Halifax	Dustyn Birkhof
19	Saskatchewan (from Colorado)	Sam Firth
20	Georgia	Bo Columbus
21	Buffalo	Larson Sundown
22	Saskatchewan	Reed Kurtz
23	Buffalo (from Vancouver)	Scott Dominey
24	Las Vegas (from Toronto)	Ryan Wagner
Third Round
25	Oshawa	Ron John
26	Las Vegas	Liam Aston
27	Buffalo (from Rochester)	Travis Longboat
28	Calgary	Nicholas Volkov
29	San Diego	Gregory Elijah-Brown
30	Halifax	Liam Patten
31	Colorado	Andrew Borgatti
32	Georgia	Isaiah Davis-Allen
33	Buffalo	Justin Sykes
34	Saskatchewan	pass
35	Vancouver	Michael Sowers
36	Toronto	pass
Fourth Round
37	Oshawa	Kevin Brownell
38	Las Vegas	Chris Corbeil
39	Rochester	Luc Magnan
40	Calgary	Cole Begley
41	San Diego	Mason Woodward
42	Halifax	Landen Sinfield
43	Colorado	Evan Messenger
All remaining teams pass

== 2024 Draft results ==
Players from the Panther City Lacrosse Club - September 2, 2024

Overall	Team	Player
First Round
1	Colorado	Will Malcolm
2	Las Vegas	Jonathan Donville
3	Philadelphia	Nick Damude
4	Vancouver	Ryan Sheridan
5	Calgary	Mathieu Gautier
6	Saskatchewan	Matt Hossack
7	Ottawa	Phil Caputo
8	Rochester	Josh Medeiros
9	Halifax	Jason Knox
10	Calgary (from Georgia)	Cam McLeod
11	San Diego	Justin Sykes
12	Toronto	Elijah Gash
13	Ottawa (from Albany)	Liam Patten
14	Philadelphia (from Buffalo)	Anthony Malcom
Second Round
15	Colorado	Brent Mitchell
16	Las Vegas	Dylan Hutchison
17	Philadelphia	Connor Sellars
18	Vancouver	Ronin Pusch
19	Calgary	Justin Morgan
20	Saskatchewan	Evan Messenger
21	Ottawa	Colin Sharkey
22	Rochester	Mike Sisselberger
23	Halifax	Pat Foley
24	Georgia	Caleb Kueber
25	San Diego	Callum Crawford
26	Las Vegas	Brandon Goodwin
27	Philadelphia	Tim Manning

== 2011 Draft results ==
Players from the Boston Blazers - September 9, 2011

Overall	Team	Player
First Round
1	Philadelphia	Dan Dawson
2	Edmonton	Kyle Rubisch
3	Minnesota (from Colorado)	Anthony Cosmo
4	Minnesota	Josh Sanderson
5	Rochester	Mike Kirk
6	Buffalo	Kevin Buchanan
7	Calgary	Nick Rose
8	Washington	Jamie Rooney
9	Minnesota (from Toronto)	Greg Downing
Second Round
10	Philadelphia	John Orson
11	Edmonton	Ryan Dilks
12	Colorado	Ryan Hotaling
13	Minnesota	Mitch Belisle
14	Rochester	Casey Powell
15	Buffalo	Damon Edwards
16	Calgary	Geoff McNulty
17	Washington	Josh Wasson
18	Toronto	Jon Durno
Third Round
19	Philadelphia	Nick Cotter
20	Edmonton	pass
21	Colorado	Greg Peyser
22	Minnesota	Jason Duboe
23	Rochester	Jack Reid
24	Buffalo	pass
25	Calgary	Brock Armour
26	Washington	Dan Teat
27	Toronto	pass
Fourth Round
28	Philadelphia	Brett Queener
29	Colorado	Gary Bining
30	Minnesota	Tyler Collins
31	Rochester	pass
32	Calgary	Kevin Leveille
33	Washington	pass
Fifth Round
34	Philadelphia	pass
35	Colorado	Sean Morris
36	Minnesota	pass
37	Calgary	pass
All remaining teams pass

== 2010 Draft results ==
Players from the Orlando Titans - August 6, 2010

Overall	Player	Team
First Round
1	Colorado	Matt Vinc
2	Boston (From Philadelphia)	Casey Powell
3	Rochester	Jordan Hall
4	Minnesota	Rory Smith
5	Philadelphia (From Boston)	Brendan Mundorf
6	Boston (From Buffalo)	John Orsen
7	Edmonton	Bill Greer
8	Philadelphia (From Calgary)	Ryan Boyle
9	Toronto	Mike McLellan
10	Washington	Chet Koneczny
Second Round
11	Colorado	Jarett Park
12	Philadelphia	Stephen Peyser
13	Rochester	Dan Hardy
14	Minnesota	Tim O'Brien
15	Boston	Greg Peyser
16	Buffalo	Jesse Guerin
17	Edmonton	Matt Alrich
18	Calgary	Kurtis Wagar
19	Toronto	Mat MacLeod
20	Washington	Matt Zash
Third Round
21	Colorado	Chad Thompson
22	Philadelphia	Jeff Bigas
23	Rochester	Kenny Nims
24	Minnesota	Matt Bocklet
25	Boston	Mike Ammann
26	Buffalo	Matt Brown
27	Edmonton	pass
28	Calgary	Keith Cromwell
29	Toronto	pass
30	Washington	pass
Fourth Round
31	Colorado	Marc Burton
32	Philadelphia	Dan Cocoziello
33	Rochester	Mike Evans
34	Minnesota	pass
35	Boston	Chris Passavia
36	Buffalo	pass
37	Calgary	Rob Smith
Fifth Round
38	Colorado	Bryan Barrett
39	Philadelphia	pass
40	Rochester	Bobby Horsey
41	Boston	pass
42	Calgary	Brian Spallina
All remaining teams pass

== 2009 Draft results ==
Players from the Portland LumberJax - July 7, 2009

Overall	Player	Team
First Round
1	Edmonton	Brodie Merrill
2	Toronto	Tyler Codron
3	Minnesota	Scott Stewart
4	Philadelphia	Peter Jacobs
5	Colorado	Cory Conway
6	Minnesota (from Rochester)	Richard Morgan
7	Washington	Peter Morgan
8	Boston	Kevin Leveille
9	Buffalo	Jamison Koesterer
10	New York	Ryan Powell
11	Calgary	Luke Forget
Second Round
12	Edmonton	Matt Disher
13	Toronto	Joel Weber
14	Minnesota	Tim Campeau
15	Philadelphia	Matt Flindell
16	Colorado	David Morgan
17	Rochester	Dan Stroup
18	Washington	Brad MacDonald
19	Boston	Matt Yager
20	Buffalo	pass
21	New York	Matt Brown
22	Calgary	Dayne Michaud
Third Round
23	Edmonton	Pat Jones
24	Toronto	pass
25	Minnesota	Bruce Alexander
26	Philadelphia	Derek Malawsky
27	Colorado	Dallas Eliuk
28	Rochester	pass
29	Washington	Derek Lowe
All remaining teams pass

== 2008 Draft results ==
There were two separate dispersal drafts in 2008. In June, the Arizona Sting announced that they would not be returning as promised after they decided not to play in the 2008 season. Then just weeks before the 2009 season started, the Chicago Shamrox suspended operations, requiring a second draft.

=== June 30, 2008 ===
Players from the Arizona Sting

Overall	Player	Team
First Round
1	Boston	Dan Dawson
2	Edmonton	Andy Secore
3	Chicago	Scott Self
4	Toronto	Craig Conn
5	Rochester	Lindsay Plunkett
6	Calgary	Bruce Codd
7	Colorado	Bruce Murray
8	San Jose	Mike Grimes
9	Philadelphia	Rob Blasdell
10	New York	Jamie Rooney
11	Minnesota	Chris McKay
12	Portland	Derek Malawsky
13	Buffalo	Greg Hinman
Second Round
14	Boston	Peter Veltman
15	Edmonton	Chris Seller
16	Chicago	Brad MacDonald
17	Toronto	Mike Attwood
18	Rochester	Matt Brown
19	Calgary	Pass
20	Colorado	Matt Ward
21	San Jose	Pass
22	Philadelphia	Luc Pinder
23	New York	Pass
24	Minnesota	Brad Dairon
25	Portland	Kyle McEwen

=== December 12, 2008 ===
Players from the Chicago Shamrox

Overall	Player	Team
First Round
1	Boston	Anthony Cosmo
2	Edmonton	Scott Self
3	Toronto	Bill McGlone
4	Rochester	Mike Kirk
5	Calgary	Tom Montour
6	Colorado	Brad Self
7	San Jose	Steve McKinlay
8	Philadelphia	Mat Giles
9	New York	Josh Funk
10	Minnesota	Kevin Fines
11	Portland	Kevin Leveille
12	Buffalo	Cody Jacobs
Second Round
13	Boston	Geoff Griffiths
14	Edmonton	Callum Crawford
15	Toronto	Josh Wasson
16	Rochester	Bobby McBride
17	Colorado	Steven Brooks
18	San Jose	Jake Byrne
19	New York	Peter Striebel
20	Minnesota	Drew Candy
21	Buffalo	Cory Stringer
Third Round
23	Edmonton	Darryl Gibson
24	Rochester	Craig Robertson
Fourth Round
25	Rochester	Pat Saunders
Fifth Round
26	Rochester	Brock Boyle

== 2007 Draft results ==
Players from the Arizona Sting and Boston Blazers - November 5, 2007

Player	Team	Former team
First Round
Portland	Dan Dawson	Arizona
New York	Patrick Merrill	Boston
Philadelphia	Rob Blasdell	Arizona
Chicago	Scott Self	Arizona
Minnesota (from Edmonton)	Andy Secore	Arizona
Chicago (from Toronto)	Lindsay Plunkett	Arizona
San Jose	Peter Veltman	Arizona
Minnesota	Ryan Avery	Boston
Calgary	Pat Campbell	Boston
Buffalo	Craig Conn	Arizona
Colorado	Bruce Murray	Arizona
Rochester	Jack Reid	Boston
Second Round
Rochester	Matt Lyons	Arizona
Colorado	Matt Brown	Arizona
Buffalo	Brian Croswell	Boston
Calgary	Bruce Codd	Arizona
Minnesota	Mike Grimes	Boston
San Jose	Sean Morris	Boston
Toronto	Curtis Ptolmey	Arizona
Edmonton	Chris Seller	Arizona
Chicago	Brock Boyle	Boston
Philadelphia	Jamie Rooney	Arizona
New York	Matt Alrich	Arizona
Portland	Derek Malawsky	Arizona
Third Round
Portland	Brad MacDonald	Arizona
New York	Greg Downing	Arizona
Philadelphia	Brenden Thenhaus	Boston
Chicago	Andrew Lazore	Boston
Edmonton	Chris McKay	Arizona
Toronto	Jon Harasym	Boston
San Jose	Keegan Davidson	Arizona
Minnesota	Mark Tinning	Arizona
Calgary	Greg Hinman	Arizona
Buffalo	Joe Smith	Arizona
Colorado	Jed Prossner	Boston
Rochester	Alex Smith	Arizona

== 2005 Draft results ==
Players from the Anaheim Storm - July 20, 2005

Player	Team
Rory Glaves	Edmonton
Casey Powell	Portland
Matt Roik	San Jose
Bruce Murray	Minnesota
Peter Morgan	Philadelphia
Bill Greer	Colorado
Matt King	Calgary
Cam Bergman	Rochester
Chris McElroy	Arizona (from Buffalo)
Matt Dwane	Arizona
Scott Stewart	Portland (from Toronto)
Damien Davis	Edmonton
Adam Bysouth	Portland
Mike Law	San Jose
Ryan Powell	Minnesota
Pat Jones	Philadelphia

== 2004 Draft results ==
Players from the Vancouver Ravens - December 15, 2004

Player	Team
Craig Conn	Minnesota
Rory Glaves	Anaheim
Cam Sedgwick	Arizona
Kevin Olson	San Jose
Chris McKay	Rochester
Nick Patterson	Minnesota
Matt Dwane	Philadelphia
Randy Daly	Colorado
Curt Malawsky	Buffalo
D'Arcy Berthiaume	Minnesota
Bruce Murray	Anaheim
Noah Talbot	Arizona
Ian Hawksbee	Philadelphia
Peter Morgan	Rochester
Rich Catton	San Jose
Declined to select	Toronto
Declined to select	Colorado
Declined to select	Buffalo

== 2003 Draft results ==
Players from the Ottawa Rebel - July 31, 2003

Player	Team
Matt Disher	Anaheim
Bruce Codd	New York
Scott Self	Columbus
Kevin Howard	Philadelphia
Brennan Day	San Jose
Jamie Roy	Vancouver
Kyle Laverty	Calgary
Brad Self	Colorado
Jason Clark	Buffalo
Mat Giles	Rochester
Ryan Painter	Toronto
Stephen Evans	Anaheim
Andrew Leyshon	New York
Eric Pacey	Columbus
Jake Lawson	Philadelphia
Chris Konopliff	San Jose
Peter Veltman	Vancouver
Kevin Dostie	Calgary
Mike Henderson	Colorado
Marc Landriault	Buffalo
Shawn Zettel	Rochester
Kevin Lunnie	Toronto
Adam Mitchell	Anaheim
Derek Collins	New York
Shawn Parnell	Columbus
DJ Serr	Philadelphia
Rick Matthews	San Jose
Jamie Raffan	Vancouver
Jon Tarbell	Calgary
Declined to select	Colorado
Mike Hamilton	Buffalo
Declined to select	Rochester
Ryan McNish	Toronto

== 2002 Draft results ==
Players from the Montreal Express - September 21, 2002

Player	Team
Tracey Kelusky	Calgary
Bruce Codd	Ottawa
Peter Lough	Columbus
Jason Crosbie	Ottawa (from New Jersey)
Mat Giles	Ottawa (from New York)
Aime Caines	Buffalo
Eric Pacey	Ottawa (from Philadelphia)
Forfeited	Colorado
Bruce Alexander	Vancouver
Steve Penny	Rochester
Curtis Palidwor	Columbus (from Albany)
Todd Richard	Toronto
Brad MacArthur	Calgary
Shawn Zettel	Ottawa
D'Arcy Berthiaume	Columbus
Shawn Parnell	Ottawa (from New Jersey)
Dean Harrison	New York
Kelly Sullivan	Buffalo
Declines to select	Philadelphia
Brian Buchanon	Colorado
Troy Thompson	Vancouver
Declines to select	Rochester
Shawn Summerfield	Albany
Declines to select	Toronto

== See also ==
- National Lacrosse League entry draft
- National Lacrosse League expansion draft
