= 2024 Vancouver Warriors season =

Professional lacrosse team

2024 Vancouver Warriors
- League: NLL
- 2024 record: 8–10
- Home record: 5–4
- Road record: 3–6
- Goals for: 202
- Goals against: 211
- General Manager: Curt Malawsky
- Coach: Curt Malawsky
- Captain: Brett Mydske
- Alternate captains: Keegan Bal (home); Matt Beers (home); Reid Bowering (away); Ryan Dilks (away)
- Arena: Rogers Arena
- Average attendance: 9,218

Team leaders
- Goals: Keegan Bal (49)
- Assists: Adam Charalambides (61)
- Points: Keegan Bal (105)
- Penalties in minutes: Jackson Suboch (48)
- Loose Balls: Reid Bowering (112)
- Wins: Aden Walsh (6)
- Goals against average: Aaron Bold (11.47)

The Vancouver Warriors are a professional lacrosse team based in Vancouver, British Columbia. The team plays in the National Lacrosse League (NLL). The 2024 season was the 24th in franchise history and the 10th season in Vancouver. The franchise previously played in Everett, Washington, San Jose, and Albany, New York.

This was the first season for the Warriors under new head coach and general manager Curt Malawsky. This season also saw a new standings and schedule format, as the NLL announced the dissolution of the Eastern and Western conferences.

== Regular season ==
=== Final standings ===
P	Team	GP	W	L	PCT	GB	Home	Road	GF	GA	Diff	GF/GP	GA/GP
1	Toronto Rock – xz	18	15	3	.833	0.0	7–2	8–1	218	169	+49	12.11	9.39
2	San Diego Seals – x	18	13	5	.722	2.0	8–1	5–4	210	178	+32	11.67	9.89
3	Albany FireWolves – x	18	11	7	.611	4.0	5–4	6–3	206	191	+15	11.44	10.61
4	Buffalo Bandits – x	18	11	7	.611	4.0	6–3	5–4	237	212	+25	13.17	11.78
5	Georgia Swarm – x	18	10	8	.556	5.0	6–3	4–5	198	197	+1	11.00	10.94
6	Halifax Thunderbirds – x	18	10	8	.556	5.0	6–3	4–5	228	200	+28	12.67	11.11
7	Panther City Lacrosse Club – x	18	9	9	.500	6.0	5–4	4–5	205	202	+3	11.39	11.22
8	Rochester Knighthawks – x	18	8	10	.444	7.0	4–5	4–5	214	226	−12	11.89	12.56
9	New York Riptide	18	8	10	.444	7.0	4–5	4–5	206	234	−28	11.44	13.00
10	Saskatchewan Rush	18	8	10	.444	7.0	4–5	4–5	217	210	+7	12.06	11.67
11	Calgary Roughnecks	18	8	10	.444	7.0	6–3	2–7	198	194	+4	11.00	10.78
12	Vancouver Warriors	18	8	10	.444	7.0	5–4	3–6	202	211	−9	11.22	11.72
13	Philadelphia Wings	18	6	12	.333	9.0	1–8	5–4	198	233	−35	11.00	12.94
14	Las Vegas Desert Dogs	18	5	13	.278	10.0	2–7	3–6	176	223	−47	9.78	12.39
15	Colorado Mammoth	18	5	13	.278	10.0	4–5	1–8	193	226	−33	10.72	12.56

=== Game log ===
Game	Date	Opponent	Location	Score	OT	Attendance	Record
1	December 1, 2023	Panther City Lacrosse Club	Rogers Arena	L 7–11		6,000	0–1
2	December 16, 2023	Georgia Swarm	Rogers Arena	W 15–7		4,500	1–1
3	December 23, 2023	@ Rochester Knighthawks	Blue Cross Arena	L 11–13		3,845	1–2
4	December 30, 2023	@ Colorado Mammoth	Ball Arena	L 11–12	OT	9,743	1–3
5	January 13, 2024	Calgary Roughnecks	Rogers Arena	L 7–14		11,457	1–4
6	January 20, 2024	@ Saskatchewan Rush	SaskTel Centre	W 11–9		8,250	2–4
7	January 26, 2024	Colorado Mammoth	Rogers Arena	L 8–14		9,844	2–5
8	February 2, 2024	@ Georgia Swarm	Gas South Arena	L 11–12	OT	6,957	2–6
9	February 10, 2024	Saskatchewan Rush	Rogers Arena	L 9–12		9,371	2–7
10	February 24, 2024	@ Toronto Rock	FirstOntario Centre	L 5–9		7,611	2–8
11	March 1, 2024	Buffalo Bandits	Rogers Arena	W 13–12		10,355	3–8
12	March 8, 2024	@ Albany FireWolves	MVP Arena	L 8–13		3,231	3–9
13	March 15, 2024	Las Vegas Desert Dogs	Rogers Arena	W 13–12		9,716	4–9
14	March 23, 2024	@ Philadelphia Wings	Wells Fargo Center	W 21–12		10,319	5–9
15	March 30, 2024	@ Las Vegas Desert Dogs	Michelob Ultra Arena	W 12–9		6,233	6–9
16	April 5, 2024	Halifax Thunderbirds	Rogers Arena	W 15–13		10,561	7–9
17	April 13, 2024	New York Riptide	Rogers Arena	W 16–10		11,157	8–9
18	April 19, 2024	@ San Diego Seals	Pechanga Arena	L 9–16		4,639	8–10

== Roster ==
Vancouver Warriors roster
Active (21-man) roster		Inactive roster	Coaches
Goaltenders: 77 (Canada) Aaron Bold; -- (Canada) Chase Cosgrove; -- (Canada) Keegan Melenychuk; 39 (Canada) Connor O'Toole; 29 (Canada) Aden Walsh; Defencemen: 4 (Canada) Matt Beers (A); 28 (Canada) Reid Bowering (A); 19 (Canada) Steph Charbonneau; 24 (Canada) Ryan Dilks (A); 19 (Canada) Owen Grant; 95 (Canada) Tyrell Hamer-Jackson; 81 (Canada) Anthony Kalinich; 37 (Canada) Trent Kellner; 51 (Canada) Tyson Kirkness; 86 (Canada) John Lintz; 2 (Canada) Brett Mydske (C); 46 (Canada) Tyler Sceviour; 47 (Canada) Nick Scott; 12 (Canada) Aidan Solomon; -- (Canada) Taylor Stuart; 37 (Canada) Jackson Suboch; 96 (Canada) Chris Willman	Forwards: 45 (Canada) Keegan Bal (A); 41 (Canada) Isaac Bot; 8 (Canada) Adam Charalambides; 21 (Canada) Kevin Crowley; 11 (Canada) Dean Fairall; -- (Canada) Drew Kask; 67 (Canada) Kyle Killen; 10 (Canada) Riley Loewen; 96 (Canada) Ryan Martel; 22 (Canada) James Rahe; 87 (Canada) Chase Scanlan; Transition: 54 (Canada) Marcus Klarich; 41 (Canada) Nash Moog		Head coach: Curt Malawsky; Assistant coaches: Bob McMahon (offence); Rob Williams (defence); Dwight Maetche (goaltending); Grant Coghill (video); Legend: * Suspended list; (C) Captain; (A) Alternate captain; Roster updated NLL Transactions

=== Entry Draft ===
The 2023 NLL Entry Draft took place on September 16, 2023.

The Vancouver Warriors selected:

Round	Overall	Player	Position	Year of Birth	College/Club
1	4	Payton Cormier	forward	2000	University of Virginia
1	7	Brock Haley	forward	2001	University of Vermont
1	9	Brayden Laity	defence	2003	Port Coquitlam Saints (BCJALL)
1	18	Connor O'Toole	goaltender	2003	Brampton Jr. Excelsiors
3	40	Alec Stathakis	faceoff	2000	University of Denver
4	55	Sam Handley	forward	1999	University of Pennsylvania
6	84	Drew Andre	Forward	2001	Lewis University
