= NLL Draft =

NLL draft may refer to:

- National Lacrosse League expansion draft
- National Lacrosse League dispersal draft
- National Lacrosse League Entry Draft
