= Malawsky =

Malawsky is a surname. Notable people with the surname include:

- Curt Malawsky (born 1970), Canadian lacrosse player and coach
- Derek Malawsky (born 1973), Canadian lacrosse player
