= National Lacrosse League expansion draft =

The National Lacrosse League expansion draft is a meeting where the general managers of expansion National Lacrosse League teams begin to fill their teams with unprotected players from the rosters of existing NLL teams. Such a draft occurs whenever an expansion NLL franchise is awarded. The most recent expansion draft was in 2022 for the Las Vegas Desert Dogs. Prior drafts were:

- 2021 (Panther City LC)
- 2019 (New York Riptide and Rochester Knighthawks)
- 2018 (Philadelphia Wings, San Diego Seals)
- 2008 and 2007 (Boston)
- 2006 (New York and Chicago)
- 2005 (Edmonton and Portland).

== 2022 draft results ==
July 7, 2022

Round	Team	Player	Former team
1	Las Vegas	Jackson Nishimura	Albany FireWolves
2	Las Vegas	Connor Fields	Buffalo Bandits
3	Las Vegas	Riley Hutchcraft	Toronto Rock
4	Las Vegas	John Wagner	Rochester Knighthawks
5	Las Vegas	Landon Kells	Calgary Roughnecks
6	Las Vegas	Brett McIntyre	Colorado Mammoth
7	Las Vegas	Connor Kirst	Georgia Swarm
8	Las Vegas	James Barclay	Halifax Thunderbirds
9	Las Vegas	Ty Thompson	New York Riptide
10	Las Vegas	Jack Hannah	Panther City LC
11	Las Vegas	Jackson Suboch	Philadelphia Wings
12	Las Vegas	Frank Scigliano	San Diego Seals
13	Las Vegas	Jeff Cornwall	Saskatchewan Rush
14	Las Vegas	Tyson Roe	Vancouver Warriors

The following trades were made immediately following the draft:

- Las Vegas traded Riley Hutchcraft, Connor Fields and their 1st round draft pick (1st overall) in the 2022 Entry Draft to Rochester for Charlie Bertrand and their 1st round pick (2nd overall), 4th round pick (74th overall), 6th round pick (91st overall) in the 2022 Entry Draft and their 1st round selection in the 2023 Entry Draft
- Las Vegas traded Brett McIntyre back to Colorado for Sam Firth and Erik Turner
- Las Vegas traded Frank Scigliano back to San Diego for Mark Glicini, Brandon Clelland, their 2nd round pick (26th overall) in the 2022 Entry Draft and their 3rd round pick in the 2023 Entry Draft
- Las Vegas traded Jeff Cornwall to Calgary for Marshal King and their 1st round pick (18th overall) in the 2022 Entry Draft

== 2021 draft results ==
June 29, 2021

Round	Team	Player	Former team
1	Panther City	Matt Hossack	Saskatchewan
2	Panther City	Charlie Kitchen	Albany
3	Panther City	Liam Byrnes	Philadelphia
4	Panther City	Connor Kelly	New York
5	Panther City	Nick Damude	San Diego
6	Panther City	Patrick Dodds	Calgary
7	Panther City	Sam Clare	Vancouver
8	Panther City	Liam Patten	Buffalo
9	Panther City	Phil Caputo	Rochester
10	Panther City	Ryan Benesch	Halifax
11	Panther City	Kevin Oreleman	Georgia
12	Panther City	Chris Wardle*	Colorado
13	Panther City	Scott Dominey*	Toronto

- Immediately following the draft, Chris Wardle was traded back to the Mammoth in exchange for Will Malcom and Jordan Trottier. Scott Dominey was traded to New York in exchange for Dawson Theede.

== 2019 draft results ==
July 9, 2019

Round	Team	Player	Former team
1	Rochester	Shawn Evans	Buffalo
1	New York	Jordan Durston	Buffalo
2	Rochester	Holden Cattoni	Georgia
2	New York	John Ranagan	Georgia
3	Rochester	Rylan Hartley	San Diego
3	New York	Connor Kelly	San Diego
4	Rochester	Shane Simpson	Calgary
4	New York	Dan MacRae	Calgary
5	Rochester	Curtis Knight	Saskatchewan
5	New York	Jeff Cornwall	Saskatchewan
6	Rochester	Dan Lintner	Toronto
6	New York	Kieran McArdle	Toronto
7	Rochester	Frank Brown	Philadelphia
7	New York	Mike Manley	Philadelphia
8	Rochester	Matthew Bennett	Halifax
8	New York	Dawson Theede	Halifax
9	Rochester	Steve Fryer	Colorado
9	New York	Tyler Digby	New England
10	Rochester	Chris Wardle*	Colorado
10	New York	Alex Buque	New England
11	Rochester	Brandon Goodwin	Vancouver
11	New York	Jean-Luc Chetner	Vancouver

- - Immediately following the draft, Wardle was traded back to the Mammoth in exchange for Julian Garritano and Mike Mallory. Mallory was then traded to the Warriors for Travis Burton and a 2nd round pick in the 2020 entry draft.

== 2018 draft results ==
July 16, 2018

Round	Team	Player	Former team
1	Philadelphia	Brett Hickey	Toronto
1	San Diego	Turner Evans	Toronto
2	Philadelphia	Kiel Matisz	Georgia
2	San Diego	Brett Mydske	Saskatchewan
3	Philadelphia	Jordan Hall	Georgia
3	San Diego	Adrian Sorichetti	Saskatchewan
4	Philadelphia	Josh Currier	Rochester
4	San Diego	Cam Holding	Colorado
5	Philadelphia	Frank Brown	Rochester
5	San Diego	Bryce Sweeting*	Colorado
6	Philadelphia	Anthony Joaquim	New England
6	San Diego	Frank Scigliano	Calgary
7	Philadelphia	Matt Rambo	New England
7	San Diego	Garrett MacIntosh	Calgary
8	Philadelphia	Vaughn Harris	Buffalo
8	San Diego	Casey Jackson	Vancouver
9	Philadelphia	Davide DiRuscio	Buffalo
9	San Diego	Brendan Ranford	Vancouver

- - Immediately following the draft, Sweeting was traded to the Buffalo Bandits in exchange for Ethan Schott and a 2nd round pick in the 2018 entry draft.

== 2008 draft results ==
July 24, 2008 .

Team	Player	Former team
Boston	Mike Poulin	Toronto
Boston	Mitch Belisle	New York
Boston	Matt Lyons	Rochester
Boston	Kyle Laverty	Buffalo
Boston	John Gallant	Colorado
Boston	Jake Bergey	Philadelphia
Boston	Devan Wray	Calgary
Boston	Kyle Ross	Minnesota
Boston	Tom Johnson	San Jose
Boston	Matt Holman	Chicago
Boston	Michael Kilby	Portland
Boston	Cam Bergman	Edmonton*

- The Blazers traded Cam Bergman to Edmonton shortly after the Expansion Draft in exchange for forward Brenden Thenhaus and goaltender Kurtis Wagar.

== 2007 draft results ==
July 31, 2007

Team	Player	Former team
Boston	Patrick Merrill	Toronto
Boston	Pat Campbell	Edmonton
Boston	Gewas Schindler	New York
Boston	Ryan Avery	Calgary
Boston	Jed Prossner	Portland
Boston	Jake Bergey	Philadelphia
Boston	Brenden Thenhaus	Buffalo
Boston	Darren Halls	San Jose
Boston	Scott Stewart	Minnesota
Boston	Jon Harasym	Chicago
Boston	Mike Grimes	Arizona
Boston	Brian Langtry	Colorado
Boston	Brian Croswell	Rochester

== 2006 draft results ==
July 12, 2006

Team	Player	Former team
Chicago	Brandon Miller	San Jose
New York	Pat Maddalena	Arizona
Chicago	Darryl Gibson	Toronto
New York	Curtis Palidwor	Calgary
Chicago	Callum Crawford	Calgary
New York	Aaron Bold	Portland
Chicago	Tom Montour	Portland
New York	Jon Sullivan	Minnesota
Chicago	Dan Stroup	Colorado
New York	Rich Brzeski	Philadelphia
Chicago	Chris Gill	Colorado
New York	Jarett Park	San Jose
Chicago	Bryan Kazarian	Buffalo
New York	Jeff Spano	Philadelphia
Chicago	Jon Harasym	Buffalo
New York	Mike McLellan	Arizona
Chicago	Carter Livingstone	Rochester
New York	Matt Taylor	Toronto
Chicago	Ryan O'Connor	Rochester
New York	Eric Pacey	Minnesota
Chicago	Kyle Dupont	Edmonton
New York	Tyler Heavenor	Edmonton

== 2005 draft results ==
June 15, 2005

Team	Player	Former team
Portland	Mike Hominuck	Buffalo
Edmonton	Rob Blasdell	San Jose
Portland	Brock Boyle	Minnesota
Edmonton	Kevin Howard	Calgary
Portland	Luke Forget	Toronto
Edmonton	Sandy Chapman	Toronto
Portland	Ryan Sharp	Calgary
Edmonton	Pat Campbell	Rochester
Portland	Mat Giles	Rochester
Edmonton	Brad Dairon	San Jose
Portland	Brock Robertson	Arizona
Edmonton	Randy Daly	Colorado
Portland	Tom Montour	Buffalo
Edmonton	Scott Campbell	Minnesota
Portland	Nick Schroeder	Philadelphia
Edmonton	Cory Bomberry	Arizona
Portland	Del Halladay	Colorado
Edmonton	Jeff Spano	Philadelphia

== 2004 draft results ==
October 19, 2004. Picks were announced in alphabetical order by former team.

Team	Player	Former team
Minnesota	Cam Bergman	Anaheim
Minnesota	Jason Clark	Buffalo
Minnesota	Matt King	Calgary
Minnesota	Curtis Smith	Colorado
Minnesota	Shawn Nadalen	Philadelphia
Minnesota	Jon Harasym	Rochester
Minnesota	Dan Teat	San Jose
Minnesota	Rusty Kruger	Toronto
Minnesota	Bruce Alexander	Vancouver

== 2001 draft results ==
June 15, 2001

Team	Player	Former team
Buffalo (from Calgary)	Chris Langdale	Toronto
New York (from New Jersey)	Jamie Taylor	Toronto
Vancouver	Rich Catton	Buffalo
Columbus	Phil Wetherup	Buffalo
New Jersey	Darryl Gibson	Albany
Vancouver	Ryan O'Connor	Toronto
Columbus	Craig Gelsvik	Toronto
Calgary	Randy Mearns	Rochester
Vancouver	Ian Rubel	Montreal
Columbus	Andy Duden	Buffalo
Calgary	D'Arcy Berthiaume	Albany
New Jersey	Jamie Hanford	Philadelphia
Columbus	John Rosa	Albany
Calgary	Marc Landriault	Rochester
New Jersey	Dallas Squire	Albany
Vancouver	Lindsey Plunkett	Rochester
Calgary	Jamie Raffan	Montreal
New Jersey	Joe Finstad	Ottawa
Vancouver	Jessie Phillips	Washington
Columbus	Kyle Arbuckle	Montreal
New Jersey	Paul Talmo	Buffalo
Vancouver	Mike Battista	New York
Columbus	Gewas Schindler	New York
Calgary	Jeff Shirk	Philadelphia
New Jersey (from Vancouver)	Michael Busza	Philadelphia
Montreal	Joe Hiltz	Washington
Calgary	Dan Denihen	New York
New Jersey	Blake Miller	New York
Montreal	Shawn Zettel	Ottawa
Calgary	Kevin Howard	Rochester
New Jersey	Shane Wannamaker	Montreal
Vancouver	Kevin Kaiser	Philadelphia
Philadelphia (from Calgary)	Dan Martin	Washington
New Jersey	Travis Kilgour	Washington
Vancouver	Nick Hartofilis	Ottawa
Montreal	Jason Tasse	Ottawa

== 1999 draft results ==
August 26, 1999

Team	Player	Former team
Albany	Rob Blasdell	Toronto
Albany	Josh Sanderson	Rochester
Albany	Troy Cordingley	Buffalo
Albany	Steve Sombrotto	New York
Albany	Todd Evans	Philadelphia
Albany	Dave Evans	Pittsburgh
Albany	Owen Benedict	Syracuse

== See also ==
- National Lacrosse League dispersal draft
- National Lacrosse League entry draft
