= Tom Ethington =

American lacrosse player

Personal information
- Born: April 6, 1980 (age 45) Glenview, Illinois, U.S.
- Height: 6 ft 3 in (191 cm)
- Weight: 215 lb (98 kg; 15 st 5 lb)

Sport
- Position: Forward
- Shoots: Left
- NLL draft: 81st overall, 2002; Colorado Mammoth
- NLL team: Colorado Mammoth
- MLL team: Denver Outlaws
- Pro career: 2003–2011

Tom Ethington (born April 6, 1980) is a former lacrosse player for the Denver Outlaws of Major League Lacrosse, who got him in the 2011 MLL Supplemental Draft, and the Colorado Mammoth in the National Lacrosse League. He played college lacrosse at the University of Denver. He was named in the initial Team USA squad for the 2007 World Indoor Lacrosse Championship. He retired from the MLL after being waived in 2011.

== Statistics ==
=== NLL ===
		Regular Season						Playoffs
Season	Team	GP	G	A	Pts	LB	PIM	GP	G	A	Pts	LB	PIM
2003	Colorado	4	1	1	2	8	6	--	--	--	--	--	--
2005	Colorado	9	0	1	1	23	8	1	0	0	0	2	0
2006	Colorado	15	3	2	5	41	18	3	1	0	1	16	2
2007	Colorado	13	0	2	2	36	12	1	0	0	0	1	0
2008	Colorado	16	1	3	4	60	30	1	0	0	0	1	0
2009	Colorado	16	2	5	7	61	17	1	0	0	0	4	0
2010	Colorado	15	2	4	6	57	6	--	--	--	--	--	--
2011	Colorado	16	0	3	3	42	2	1	0	0	0	1	0
NLL totals		94	9	21	30	328	99	8	1	0	1	25	2
