= Jamie Shewchuk =

Canadian lacrosse player

Personal information
- Nickname: Shewy
- Born: August 5, 1985 (age 41) Edmonton, Alberta, Canada
- Height: 5 ft 10 in (178 cm)
- Weight: 175 lb (79 kg; 12 st 7 lb)

Sport
- Position: Forward
- Shoots: Left
- NLL draft: 25th overall, 2006; Colorado Mammoth
- NLL team Former teams: Colorado Mammoth; Minnesota Swarm
- Pro career: 2007–

Jamie Shewchuk (born August 5, 1985 in Edmonton, Alberta) is a Canadian professional box lacrosse player on the Colorado Mammoth. Shewchuk was the Colorado Mammoth's number 25 overall pick for the 2006 draft.

During the 2007 season, Shewchuk was named Rookie of the Week for week 6, and was also named to the All-Rookie team.

After four years in Colorado, Shewchuk was traded during the 2011 season along with a 2012 draft pick to the Minnesota Swarm for Tim Campeau and a 2011 draft pick. Shewchuk finished the 2011 season in Minnesota, but returned to the Mammoth for the 2012 season. After missing the 2013 season, Shewchuk was again signed by the Mammoth for 2014.

Shewchuk is also an instructor at the US Box Lacrosse Academy.

== Stats ==
=== NLL ===
Jamie Shewchuk		Regular season									Playoffs								
Season	Team	GP	G	A	Pts	LB	PIM	Pts/GP	LB/GP	PIM/GP	GP	G	A	Pts	LB	PIM	Pts/GP	LB/GP	PIM/GP
2007	Colorado Mammoth	15	27	26	53	69	19	3.53	4.60	1.27	1	3	2	5	6	0	5.00	6.00	0.00
2008	Colorado Mammoth	15	26	38	64	69	24	4.27	4.60	1.60	1	2	5	7	5	0	7.00	5.00	0.00
2009	Colorado Mammoth	16	20	33	53	70	16	3.31	4.38	1.00	1	2	2	4	4	0	4.00	4.00	0.00
2010	Colorado Mammoth	16	31	35	66	83	13	4.13	5.19	0.81	–	–	–	–	–	–	–	–	–
2011	Colorado Mammoth	5	5	10	15	18	2	3.00	3.60	0.40	–	–	–	–	–	–	–	–	–
2011	Minnesota Swarm	11	13	17	30	47	6	2.73	4.27	0.55	1	1	1	2	9	0	2.00	9.00	0.00
2012	Minnesota Swarm	6	6	9	15	9	0	2.50	1.50	0.00	–	–	–	–	–	–	–	–	–
2012	Colorado Mammoth	2	2	1	3	4	0	1.50	2.00	0.00	–	–	–	–	–	–	–	–	–
2014	Colorado Mammoth	3	1	2	3	8	23	1.00	2.67	7.67	–	–	–	–	–	–	–	–	–
		89	131	171	302	377	103	3.39	4.24	1.16	4	8	10	18	24	0	4.50	6.00	0.00
Career Total:		93	139	181	320	401	103	3.44	4.31	1.11									

GP–Games played; G–Goals; A–Assists; Pts–Points; LB–Loose balls; PIM–Penalty minutes; Pts/GP–Points per games played; LB/GP–Loose balls per games played; PIM/GP–Penalty minutes per games played.
