= National Lacrosse League Transition Player of the Year Award =

The Transition Player of the Year Award is given annually to the National Lacrosse League player who is chosen as the best transition player. This award debuted after the 2007 NLL season.

== Past winners ==
| Season | Winner | Team | Win # | Other finalists |
|---|---|---|---|---|
| 2026 | Zach Currier | San Diego Seals | 3 | Sam English, Toronto Rock Jordan MacIntosh, Georgia Swarm |
| 2025 | Owen Grant | Vancouver Warriors | 1 | Ryan Terefenko, Halifax Thunderbirds Zach Currier, San Diego Seals |
| 2024 | Jake Withers | Halifax Thunderbirds | 1 | Ian MacKay, Buffalo Bandits; Shane Simpson, Calgary Roughnecks |
| 2023 | Zach Currier | Calgary Roughnecks | 2 | Reid Bowering, Vancouver Warriors; Challen Rogers, Toronto Rock |
| 2022 | Zach Currier | Calgary Roughnecks | 1 | Reid Bowering, Vancouver Warriors; Challen Rogers, Toronto Rock |
| 2021 | Season cancelled | | | |
| 2020 | Challen Rogers | Toronto Rock | 2 | Zach Currier, Calgary Roughnecks; Kiel Matisz, Philadelphia Wings |
| 2019 | Challen Rogers | Toronto Rock | 1 | Zach Currier, Calgary Roughnecks; Kiel Matisz, Philadelphia Wings |
| 2018 | Joey Cupido | Colorado Mammoth | 2 | Zach Currier, Calgary Roughnecks; Challen Rogers, Toronto Rock |
| 2017 | Brodie Merrill | Toronto Rock | 3 | Jay Thorimbert, New England Black Wolves; Jordan MacIntosh, Georgia Swarm |
| 2016 | Brad Self | Rochester Knighthawks | 1 | Jordan MacIntosh, Georgia Swarm; Jeremy Thompson, Saskatchewan Rush |
| 2015 | Joey Cupido | Colorado Mammoth | 1 | Brodie Merrill, Toronto Rock; Karsen Leung, Calgary Roughnecks |
| 2014 | Jordan MacIntosh | Minnesota Swarm | 2 | Brodie Merrill, Philadelphia Wings; Jeremy Thompson, Edmonton Rush |
| 2013 | Jordan MacIntosh | Minnesota Swarm | 1 | Jesse Gamble, Toronto Rock; Brodie Merrill, Philadelphia Wings |
| 2012 | Andrew Suitor | Minnesota Swarm | 1 | |
| 2011 | Jeff Shattler | Calgary Roughnecks | 1 | |
| 2010 | Brodie Merrill | Edmonton Rush | 2 | |
| 2009 | Brodie Merrill | Portland LumberJax | 1 | |
| 2008 | Mark Steenhuis | Buffalo Bandits | 1 | |
| 2007 | Steve Toll | Rochester Knighthawks | 1 | |
