= Dillon Ward =

Canadian lacrosse player (born 1991)

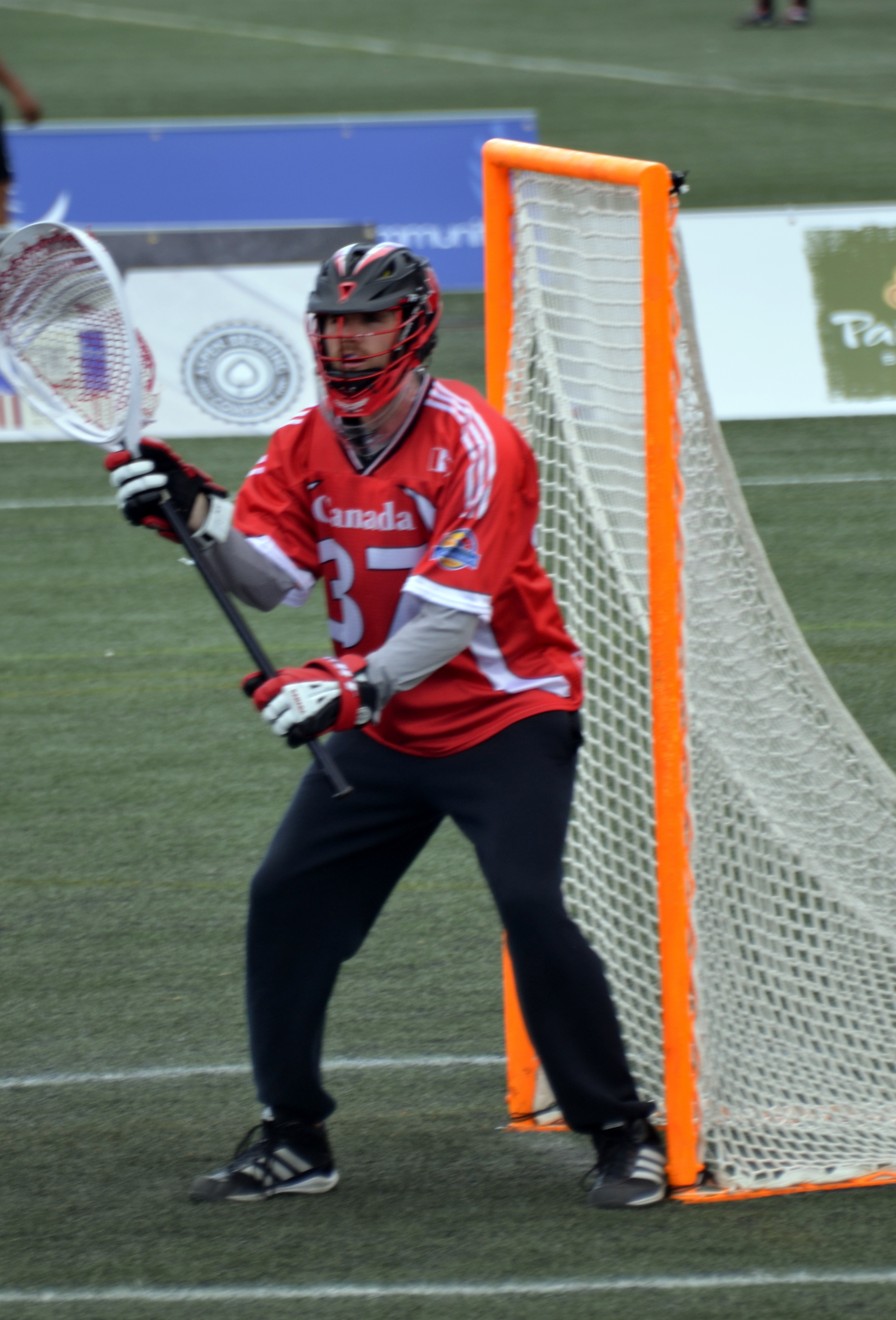
- Ward with Canada during the 2014 World Lacrosse Championship

Personal information
- Born: March 28, 1991 (age 35) Orangeville, Ontario, Canada
- Height: 6 ft 5 in (196 cm)
- Weight: 200 lb (91 kg; 14 st 4 lb)

Sport
- Position: Goaltender
- Shoots: Right
- NCAA team: Bellarmine (2013)
- NLL draft: 3rd overall, 2013; Colorado Mammoth
- NLL team: Colorado Mammoth
- PLL team Former teams: California Redwoods; Carolina Chaos; Philadelphia Waterdogs
- MSL team: Kitchener-Waterloo Kodiaks
- Pro career: 2013–

Career highlights
- NCAA: Third team All-American (2013); First team All-ECAC (2013); ECAC Goalie of the Year (2013); Bellarmine career records for wins (19), saves (576), save percentage (0.567), and goals against average (9.97); Bellarmine single season records for saves (208), save percentage (0.662), and goals against average (7.68); MLL: 1x Champion (2018); NLL: 3x All-Pro (2016-18); 1x Goalie of the Year (2017); All-Rookie Team (2014); 1x Champion (2022); 1x Finals MVP (2022); International: 2x All-World Team (2014, 2018); 2x World Lacrosse Championships Most Outstanding Goalie (2014, 2018); 1x World Lacrosse Championships MVP (2014)

Dillon James Ward (born March 28, 1991) is a Canadian professional lacrosse goaltender currently playing for the Colorado Mammoth in the National Lacrosse League and the California Redwoods in the Premier Lacrosse League.

== Personal ==
Ward was born in Orangeville, Ontario to Kent (minister with the United Church of Canada) and Patricia (lawyer). He is a graduate of The Hill Academy, (Vaughan, Ontario) and has a Communications degree from Bellarmine University in Louisville, Kentucky.

== Junior and Major ==
Ward played for the Orangeville Northmen Jr. A from 2008 to 2012. During that time the Northmen went to the provincial finals all five years, won four provincial championships and three national championships (Minto Cup). He was named Junior Goalie of the Year and Junior Player of the Year in 2010 by Inside Lacrosse. magazine, received the Robert Melville Memorial Award as top Junior A goalie in 2008, 2009 and 2011, and won the Most Valuable Player of the Minto Cup Tournament in 2012.

In 2009 he played for Team Ontario at the U19 Canadian Field Championships (First Nations Cup). Ontario won the title and Ward was named Most Valuable Player of the tournament.

In the 2013 Major Series Lacrosse entry draft he was selected forth overall by the Kitchener-Waterloo Kodiaks and played for them in the 2013 and 2014 seasons.

== NCAA ==
Ward played in net for the Bellarmine Knights from 2010 to 2013 in NCAA Division I lacrosse. He played in fifty-three games, starting in forty-three. During the 2013 season he recorded an NCAA Division-I-leading save percentage of .662 earning him a Tewaaraton Trophy nomination and was named an All American (third team). That same season, the Eastern College Athletic Conference (ECAC) unanimously named him Goalie of the Year In 2020, Ward was named as Bellarmine's player of the decade for men's lacrosse, having been the program's first ever All-American and holding school records in every goaltending category.

== MLL ==
The Ohio Machine drafted Ward in the 2013 MLL collegiate draft and subsequently traded him to the Hamilton Nationals. He played with the Nationals during the 2013 regular season and the semi-finals of the MLL 2013 Championship weekend where they were eliminated by the Chesapeake Bayhawks. On July 20, 2013, Ward recorded 21 saves against the Machine earning him seventh of thirteen highlight plays of 2013 in the MLL. The Hamilton Nationals suspended play after the 2013 season and his rights were transferred to the Florida Launch. Although he did not play in the 2014 season, the Launch protected his rights for the 2015 season. On December 17, 2014, the Denver Outlaws announced that they had traded Charlie Cipriano and Curtis Dickson to Florida for Ward and two fourth-round picks in the 2015 MLL Supplemental Draft.

== PLL ==
On March 10, Ward was announced as one of sixteen players who would be transferring from MLL to the Premier Lacrosse League. Six days later, he was selected by Chaos with the seventh overall pick in the PLL Entry Draft. However, Ward did not see any action in the 2020 season, serving as a backup to Blaze Riorden as Chaos lost in the championship game.

Ward was traded from Chaos to Waterdogs on April 30, 2021, in exchange for Wesley Berg and a first-round pick in the 2022 College Draft.

== NLL ==
The Colorado Mammoth selected Ward third overall in the 2013 NLL entry draft. He played for them during the 2014 season, ultimately earning the role of starter. He was named Rookie of the Year in the NLL by Inside Lacrosse magazine and was runner-up as NLL Rookie of the Year and named to the NLL All-Rookie Team. On September 18, 2014, the Mammoth announced that Ward had signed a five-year contract with the team. In 2016, Ward was a second team all-pro. In 2017, Ward won Goaltender of the Year and was a first team all-pro. In 2018, Ward was second team all pro again. In 2022, Ward led the Mammoth to the NLL Championship, where he made 55 saves in the decisive game 3, a record for the finals, being named Finals MVP.

Heading into the 2023 NLL season, Inside Lacrosse named Ward the top goalie in the NLL.

== International ==
Ward was selected to play for Team Canada at the FIL 2014 World Lacrosse Championship in Denver, Colorado. Ward started in all seven games that Canada played, winning six and losing one. On Saturday, July 19, 2014, Canada defeated the United States 8–5 to win gold. Ward was named Outstanding Goalie, to the All-World Team and Most Valuable Player of the tournament (the first goalie ever to win MVP).

== Statistics ==
=== MLL ===
Season	Team	GP	Min	W	L	GA	GAA	Sv	Sv%
2013	Hamilton Nationals	4	158:24	1	1	29	10.98	38	0.567
2015	Denver Outlaws	4	105:42	2	0	20	11.35	16	0.444
2016	Atlanta Blaze	5	118:00	0	1	27	13.73	27	0.500
2017	Atlanta Blaze	5	133:43	0	2	40	17.95	19	0.322
2018	Denver Outlaws	4	147:47	1	1	30	12.18	32	0.516
2019	Denver Outlaws	15	834:37	0	0	181	13.01	187	0.508

=== NLL ===
Dillon Ward		Regular Season								Playoffs							
Season	Team	GP	Min	W	L	GA	GAA	Sv	Sv %	GP	Min	W	L	GA	GAA	Sv	Sv %
2014	Colorado Mammoth	18	901:14	7	7	174	11.58	592	0.773	1	60:29	0	1	16	15.87	42	0.724
2015	Colorado Mammoth	16	827:03	7	6	173	12.55	547	0.760	1	27:45	0	1	7	15.14	21	0.750
2016	Colorado Mammoth	16	743:20	7	3	128	10.33	511	0.800	1	70:17	0	1	11	9.39	47	0.810
2017	Colorado Mammoth	18	90:05	9	6	165	109.90	632	0.793	3	173:58	2	1	38	13.11	115	0.752
2018	Colorado Mammoth	18	981:41	10	6	181	11.06	645	0.781	1	59:58	0	1	13	13.01	31	0.705
2019	Colorado Mammoth	18	963:01	5	11	174	10.84	599	0.775	2	124:04	1	1	18	8.70	90	0.833
2020	Colorado Mammoth	12	729:51	6	6	117	9.62	520	0.816	–	–	–	–	–	–	–	–
2022	Colorado Mammoth	18	985:53	9	7	168	10.22	688	0.804	7	422:26	5	2	79	11.22	289	0.785
		134	6,222:08	60	52	1,280	12.34	4,734	0.787	16	938:57	8	8	182	11.63	635	0.777
Career Total:		150	7,161:05	68	60	1,462	12.25	5,369	0.786								

GP–Games played;Min–Minutes played;W–Wins;L–Losses;GA–Goals against;GAA–Goals against average;Sv–Number of saves;Sv %–Save percentage;

=== PLL ===
Season	Team	GP	SA	2ptGA	Svs	Sv%	GAA
2021	Waterdogs LC	9	91	7	95	0.531	10.90
2022	Waterdogs LC	6	74	3	73	0.506	13.00
Total		15	165	10	168	0.520	11.95
