= Joey Cupido =

Canadian professional lacrosse player (born 1990)

Personal information
- Born: August 14, 1990 (age 36) Hamilton, Ontario, Canada
- Height: 5 ft 10 in (178 cm)
- Weight: 185 lb (84 kg; 13 st 3 lb)

Sport
- Position: Transition
- Shoots: Right
- NLL draft: 38th overall, 2011; Colorado Mammoth
- NLL team: Georgia Swarm
- MSL team: Peterborough Lakers
- Pro career: 2011–

Joey Cupido (born August 14, 1990) is a Canadian professional box lacrosse player who plays for the Georgia Swarm in the National Lacrosse League. Cupido was also a two time All-Canadian football player with the McMaster University Marauders in the CIS.

== Lacrosse career ==
Born in Hamilton, Ontario, Cupido began his junior lacrosse career with the Hamilton Bengals in the Ontario Junior B league in 2007. He moved on to the Junior A Six Nations Arrows in 2008. Cupido scored 57 goals and added 55 assists for the Arrows over three regular seasons and he finished his Junior A playoff career with 25 goals and 46 points. He was selected in the fifth round, 38th overall, by the Colorado Mammoth in the 2011 NLL draft and in the fourth round, 22nd overall, by the Kitchener-Waterloo Kodiaks in the 2012 MSL draft. Cupido appeared in only one game for Colorado in the 2012 season, but broke through in 2013 playing in all but the first regular season game and was named to the NLL All-Rookie team, leading the Mammoth and all NLL rookies with 101 loose balls. Cupido was named co-winner of the Most Valuable Defensive player in the MSL in 2014 for his play with the Kodiaks. He led the NLL in caused turnovers in 2015 and was the unanimous winner of the Transition Player of the Year award as voted by NLL writers. The NLL announced at their award ceremony in September 2015 that Cupido was the winner of the National Lacrosse League Transition Player of the Year Award and a first team NLL All-Pro. He was a member of Team Canada for the Heritage Cup in October 2017, scoring one goal in Canada's 19 to 6 victory over Team U.S.A. He led all defenders with 16 goals and tied for the NLL lead in short handed goals in 2018 and was once again named the Transition Player of the Year as voted by NLL writers, and the NLL Transition Player of the Year as awarded by the league. He was also named a first team NLL All-Pro for the 2017-2018 season. In June 2022, after winning an NLL championship with the Mammoth, he was traded to the Six Nations Chiefs by the Cobourg Kodiaks. A season ending Achilles injury cut short his 2023 season with the Mammoth. Cupido signed as a free agent with the Georgia Swarm in October 2024.

== Football career ==
Cupido played corner back in the defensive backfield for the McMaster Marauders from 2010 to 2014. In 2012 he was named a first team CIS Football All-Canadian. In 2011 he tied a CIS single game record when he recorded four interceptions in a playoff game against the Queen's University Golden Gaels. Through three seasons he had 12 interceptions in 10 post season games. Cupido and the Marauders appeared in both the 2011 and 2012 Vanier Cup championships against Laval, winning their first and only Canadian national title in the 47th Vanier Cup in 2011. Cupido missed most of the 2013 season with an elbow injury. He returned in 2014 as the Marauders once again played in the Vanier Cup, losing to the Montreal Carabins 20 to 19. Cupido was named a second team All-Canadian and the MVP of the Yates Cup. He finished his career with 14 playoff interceptions in 16 games, a CIS record for post season picks.

== Statistics ==
=== NLL ===
Joey Cupido		Regular season									Playoffs								
Season	Team	GP	G	A	Pts	LB	PIM	Pts/GP	LB/GP	PIM/GP	GP	G	A	Pts	LB	PIM	Pts/GP	LB/GP	PIM/GP
2012	Colorado Mammoth	1	0	0	0	3	2	0.00	3.00	2.00	0	0	0	0	0	0	0.00	0.00	0.00
2013	Colorado Mammoth	15	6	9	15	101	0	1.00	6.73	0.00	1	0	0	0	5	0	0.00	5.00	0.00
2014	Colorado Mammoth	17	6	7	13	74	2	0.76	4.35	0.12	1	1	1	2	4	0	2.00	4.00	0.00
2015	Colorado Mammoth	18	16	15	31	117	16	1.72	6.50	0.89	1	1	0	1	10	0	1.00	10.00	0.00
2016	Colorado Mammoth	17	2	7	9	103	14	0.53	6.06	0.82	1	1	0	1	7	0	1.00	7.00	0.00
2017	Colorado Mammoth	17	9	8	17	98	12	1.00	5.76	0.71	3	3	0	3	13	0	1.00	4.33	0.00
2018	Colorado Mammoth	18	16	11	27	111	6	1.50	6.17	0.33	1	0	0	0	4	0	0.00	4.00	0.00
2019	Colorado Mammoth	18	3	14	17	98	4	0.94	5.44	0.22	2	1	1	2	13	0	1.00	6.50	0.00
2020	Colorado Mammoth	13	7	9	16	64	6	1.23	4.92	0.46	0	0	0	0	0	0	0.00	0.00	0.00
2022	Colorado Mammoth	14	6	4	10	84	4	0.71	6.00	0.29	7	4	3	7	37	8	1.00	5.29	1.14
2023	Colorado Mammoth	6	0	2	2	18	2	0.33	3.00	0.33	0	0	0	0	0	0	0.00	0.00	0.00
2024	Colorado Mammoth	15	2	7	9	50	0	0.60	3.33	0.00	0	0	0	0	0	0	0.00	0.00	0.00
2025	Georgia Swarm	18	4	4	8	77	8	0.44	4.28	0.44	1	0	1	1	5	2	1.00	5.00	2.00
		187	77	97	174	998	76	0.93	5.34	0.41	18	11	6	17	98	10	0.94	5.44	0.56
Career Total:		205	88	103	191	1,096	86	0.93	5.35	0.42									

GP–Games played; G–Goals; A–Assists; Pts–Points; LB–Loose balls; PIM–Penalty minutes; Pts/GP–Points per games played; LB/GP–Loose balls per games played; PIM/GP–Penalty minutes per games played.

== Awards ==
Preceded by Jordan MacIntosh	NLL Transition Player of the Year; 2015	Succeeded by Brad Self
Preceded by Brodie Merrill	NLL Transition Player of the Year; 2018	Succeeded by Challen Rogers
