= 2003 NLL season =

- League: National Lacrosse League
- Sport: Indoor lacrosse
- Duration: December 27, 2002 – May 3, 2003
- Games: 16
- Teams: 12

Regular season
- Season MVP: Gary Gait (Colorado Mammoth)
- Top scorer: John Tavares (Buffalo Bandits)

Playoffs
- Eastern champions: Colorado Mammoth
- Eastern runners-up: Philadelphia Wings
- Central champions: Rochester Knighthawks
- Central runners-up: Buffalo Bandits
- Northern champions: Toronto Rock
- Northern runners-up: Calgary Roughnecks

Champion's Cup
- Champions: Toronto Rock (4th title)
- Runners-up: Rochester Knighthawks
- Finals MVP: Bob Watson (Toronto)

NLL seasons
- ← 2002 season 2004 season →

The 2003 National Lacrosse League season is the 17th season in the NLL that began on December 27, 2002, and concluded with the championship game on May 3, 2003.

In 2003, the NLL became the first major men's sports league in North America to feature a woman playing in a regular-season game. Ginny Capicchioni, a stand-out goaltender at Sacred Heart University, was signed by the New Jersey Storm as their third-string goaltender. She dressed for three games, though only played in one. Capicchioni collected one loose ball and made six saves while allowing 7 goals in 11 minutes of play.

== Team movement ==
2003 saw the Montreal Express suspend operations, and also saw the Washington Power move to Colorado, where even they were unprepared for the warm welcome they received in Denver. The franchise had drawn small crowds in Washington as well as in Pittsburgh and Baltimore before that, but averaged more than 16,000 fans per game in 2003, second in the league only to Toronto.

=== Teams ===
2003 National Lacrosse League
Division	Team	City	Arena	Capacity
Central	Albany Attack	Albany, New York	Pepsi Arena	14,236
Central	Buffalo Bandits	Buffalo, New York	HSBC Arena	18,690
Central	Columbus Landsharks	Columbus, Ohio	Nationwide Arena	18,136
Central	Rochester Knighthawks	Rochester, New York	Blue Cross Arena	10,662
East	Colorado Mammoth	Denver, Colorado	Pepsi Center	18,007
East	New Jersey Storm	East Rutherford, New Jersey	Izod Center	19,040
East	New York Saints	Uniondale, New York	Nassau Veterans Memorial Coliseum	16,234
East	Philadelphia Wings	Philadelphia, Pennsylvania	First Union Center	19,519
North	Calgary Roughnecks	Calgary, Alberta	Pengrowth Saddledome	19,289
North	Ottawa Rebel	Ottawa, Ontario	Ottawa Civic Centre	10,550
North	Toronto Rock	Toronto, Ontario	Air Canada Centre	18,800
North	Vancouver Ravens	Vancouver, British Columbia	General Motors Place	18,514

=== Map of teams ===
Central Division East Division North Division

== Milestones ==
- January 31: John Tavares became the 3rd player in NLL history (after Gary and Paul Gait) with 400 career goals, scoring 5 and adding 6 assists as the Buffalo Bandits defeated the Columbus Landsharks 19–16

== Final standings ==
=== Regular season ===
Central Division
P	Team	GP	W	L	PCT	GB	Home	Road	GF	GA	Diff	GF/GP	GA/GP
1	Rochester Knighthawks – xyz	16	12	4	.750	0.0	6–2	6–2	214	173	+41	13.38	10.81
2	Buffalo Bandits – x	16	12	4	.750	0.0	8–0	4–4	231	188	+43	14.44	11.75
3	Albany Attack	16	8	8	.500	4.0	4–4	4–4	198	191	+7	12.38	11.94
4	Columbus Landsharks	16	8	8	.500	4.0	4–4	4–4	184	203	−19	11.50	12.69

East Division
P	Team	GP	W	L	PCT	GB	Home	Road	GF	GA	Diff	GF/GP	GA/GP
1	Colorado Mammoth – xy	16	9	7	.562	0.0	6–2	3–5	226	223	+3	14.12	13.94
2	Philadelphia Wings	16	8	8	.500	1.0	6–2	2–6	203	209	−6	12.69	13.06
3	New York Saints	16	3	13	.188	6.0	2–6	1–7	198	239	−41	12.38	14.94
4	New Jersey Storm	16	3	13	.188	6.0	3–5	0–8	187	220	−33	11.69	13.75

North Division
P	Team	GP	W	L	PCT	GB	Home	Road	GF	GA	Diff	GF/GP	GA/GP
1	Toronto Rock – xy	16	11	5	.688	0.0	6–2	5–3	195	164	+31	12.19	10.25
2	Calgary Roughnecks – x	16	9	7	.562	2.0	6–2	3–5	209	207	+2	13.06	12.94
3	Vancouver Ravens – x	16	9	7	.562	2.0	5–3	4–4	208	196	+12	13.00	12.25
4	Ottawa Rebel	16	4	12	.250	7.0	3–5	1–7	174	214	−40	10.88	13.38

x: Clinched playoff berth; c: Clinched playoff berth by crossing over to another division; y: Clinched division; z: Clinched best regular season record; GP: Games Played
W: Wins; L: Losses; GB: Games back; PCT: Win percentage; Home: Record at Home; Road: Record on the Road; GF: Goals scored; GA: Goals allowed
Differential: Difference between goals scored and allowed; GF/GP: Average number of goals scored per game; GA/GP: Average number of goals allowed per game

=== Playoffs ===
Quarterfinals
6	Vancouver	12
4	Colorado	15
5	Calgary	9
3	Buffalo	16

Semifinals
4	Colorado	11
2	Toronto	15
3	Buffalo	13
1	Rochester	16

Championship
2	Toronto	8
1	Rochester	6

=== Semifinals ===
Colorado 11 @ Toronto 15
Buffalo 13 @ Rochester 16

=== Championship ===
Toronto 8 @ Rochester 6

== All Star Game ==
No NLL All-Star game was held in 2003.

== Awards ==
Award	Winner	Team
MVP Award	Gary Gait	Colorado
Rookie of the Year Award	Brian Langtry	Colorado
Coach of the Year	Darris Kilgour	Buffalo
GM of the Year Award	Kurt Silcott	Buffalo
Executive of the Year Award	Brad Banister	Calgary
Defensive Player of the Year Award	Jim Moss	Albany
Goaltender of the Year Award	Pat O'Toole	Rochester
Sportsmanship Award	Chris Driscoll	New York / Toronto
Championship Game MVP	Bob Watson	Toronto

=== Weekly awards ===
The NLL gives out awards weekly for the best overall player, best offensive player, best defensive player, and best rookie.

Week	Overall	Offensive	Defensive	Rookie
1	Bill Greer	Tracey Kelusky	Matt Roik	Patrick Merrill
2	Erik Miller	Steve Toll	Erik Miller	Cam Sedgwick
3	Jason Clark	Jason Clark	Pat Campbell	Chris Schiller
4	Steve Dietrich	Pat Maddalena	Bill Greer	Tom Montour
5	Dallas Eliuk	Blaine Manning	Dallas Eliuk	Aaron Wilson
6	John Tavares	Del Halladay	Curtis Palidwor	Aaron Wilson
7	Chris Driscoll	Chris Driscoll	Curtis Palidwor	Nick Polanco
8	Bill Greer	Colin Doyle	Pat O'Toole	Lewis Ratcliff
9	Jim Veltman	Tom Marechek	Jim Veltman	Aaron Wilson
10	Gary Gait	Shawn Williams	Gee Nash	Travis Gillespie
11	Jeff Ratcliffe	Jeff Ratcliffe	Kyle Couling	Brian Tower
12	Gary Gait	Derek Malawsky	Dwight Maetche	Marc Morley
13	Gary Gait	Curt Malawsky	Gee Nash	Brian Langtry
14	Tracey Kelusky	John Grant, Jr.	Pat O'Toole	Brian Langtry
15	Pat Maddalena	Mike Accursi	Brian Beisel	Brian Lantry
16	Erik Miller	Pat Maddalena	Erik Miller	Marc Morley

=== Monthly awards ===
Awards are also given out monthly for the best overall player and best rookie.

Month	Overall	Rookie
Jan	Pat Maddalena; John Tavares (tie)	Cam Sedgwick
Feb	Chris Driscoll	Aaron Wilson
Mar	Gary Gait	Brian Langtry

== Statistics leaders ==
Bold numbers indicate new single-season records. Italics indicate tied single-season records.

Stat	Player	Team	Number
Goals	Gary Gait	Colorado	**61**
Assists	John Tavares	Buffalo	58
Points	John Tavares	Buffalo	107
Penalty Minutes	Casey Zaph	Rochester	59
Loose Balls	Jim Veltman	Toronto	**207**
Save Pct	Pat O'Toole	Rochester	78.3

== Attendance ==
=== Regular season ===
Home team	Home games	Average attendance	Total attendance
Toronto Rock	8	16,733	133,867
Colorado Mammoth	8	16,488	131,907
Philadelphia Wings	8	14,021	112,168
Calgary Roughnecks	8	11,446	91,567
Rochester Knighthawks	8	8,984	71,870
Vancouver Ravens	8	8,337	66,699
Buffalo Bandits	8	7,002	56,015
New Jersey Storm	8	5,484	43,874
New York Saints	8	4,260	34,079
Ottawa Rebel	8	4,202	33,619
Albany Attack	8	3,689	25,103
Columbus Landsharks	8	3,138	25,103
**League**	**96**	**8,603**	**825,871**

=== Playoffs ===
Home team	Home games	Average attendance	Total attendance
Colorado Mammoth	1	17,129	17,129
Toronto Rock	1	16,733	16,733
Rochester Knighthawks	2	9,943	19,885
Buffalo Bandits	1	6,761	6,761
**League**	**5**	**12,102**	**60,508**

== See also ==
- 2003 in sports
