= Brian Langtry =

American lacrosse player

Personal information
- Nationality: American
- Born: May 16, 1976 (age 50) Massapequa, New York
- Height: 5 ft 10 in (178 cm)
- Weight: 185 lb (84 kg; 13 st 3 lb)

Sport
- Position: Forward
- Shoots: Right
- NLL draft: 38th overall, 1998; New York Saints
- NLL teams: Colorado Mammoth; New York Saints
- MLL team Former teams: Long Island Lizards; Denver Outlaws
- Pro career: 2000–2011

Brian Langtry (born May 16, 1976) is an American former lacrosse player for the Colorado Mammoth of the National Lacrosse League and the Denver Outlaws of Major League Lacrosse. Langtry was born in Massapequa, NY, and played NCAA lacrosse for Hofstra University.

== NLL ==
Langtry began his NLL career with the New York Saints in 2000, but only played three games. He didn't play again until 2003 with the Mammoth, and was named the NLL Rookie of the Year. He won the Champion's Cup with the Mammoth in 2006.

In 2003, Langtry scored the game-winning goal in the Mammoth's first-ever game, a 13-12 double-overtime victory over the Toronto Rock.

In the 2007 National Lacrosse League expansion draft, Langtry was selected by the expansion Boston Blazers, but was immediately traded back to the Mammoth. On March 22, 2008, Langtry set a career high with 9 goals and added 4 assists as the Mammoth lost to the Portland LumberJax, and was awarded "Offensive Player of the Week" honors by the league. During the 2009 NLL season, he was named a reserve to the All-Star game.

Langtry announced his retirement shortly before the 2012 season.

== Statistics ==
=== NLL ===
		Regular Season						Playoffs
Season	Team	GP	G	A	Pts	LB	PIM	GP	G	A	Pts	LB	PIM
2000	New York	3	1	0	1	6	5	--	--	--	--	--	--
2003	Colorado	15	28	34	62	107	13	2	7	1	8	9	6
2004	Colorado	16	24	26	50	59	4	1	0	0	0	2	0
2005	Colorado	10	16	11	27	37	10	1	5	1	6	2	0
2006	Colorado	15	24	26	50	72	9	3	10	5	15	15	0
2007	Colorado	16	31	36	67	77	24	1	3	2	5	9	0
2008	Colorado	14	30	33	63	58	21	1	1	2	3	4	0
2009	Colorado	16	38	41	79	80	24	1	1	1	2	5	0
2010	Colorado	16	24	41	65	68	6	--	--	--	--	--	--
2011	Colorado	14	15	25	40	46	18	1	0	2	2	1	0
NLL totals		135	231	273	504	610	134	11	27	14	41	47	6

=== MLL ===
Season	Team	GP	G	2ptG	A	Pts	GB	PIM
2006	Denver	11	17	2	18	37	20	2
2007	Denver	11	26	2	11	39	13	5.5
2008	Denver	12	24	3	20	47	16	4
2009	Denver	11	15	4	10	29	5	10.5
MLL Totals		45	82	11	59	141	54	22

== Awards ==
Preceded by Blaine Manning	NLL Rookie of the Year; 2003	Succeeded by Taylor Wray

== Career outside of lacrosse ==
Brian Langtry also taught Humanities at the Challenge School in Denver, Colorado. He resigned after a legal incident.
