= John Gallant =

Canadian lacrosse player

Personal information
- Nickname: GQ
- Born: June 12, 1978 Brantford, Ontario, Canada
- Height: 6 ft 0 in (183 cm)
- Weight: 185 lb (84 kg; 13 st 3 lb)

Sport
- Position: Defenseman
- Shoots: Left
- NLL team Former teams: Colorado Mammoth; Washington Power
- Pro career: 2002–

John Gallant is a former lacrosse player and captain of the Colorado Mammoth in the National Lacrosse League.

Before signing on with the Colorado Mammoth, Gallant played for the Washington Power for one season. He was voted to the 2007 All-star game as a reserve defenseman and helped Team Canada defend their title at the 2007 World Indoor Lacrosse Championships in Halifax Nova Scotia, Canada.

Gallant was the only remaining player on the Colorado Mammoth to have played with the club for each of its seven seasons, and he was announced as team captain on November 16, 2009, succeeding the team's all time leading scorer, Gavin Prout.

== Statistics ==
=== NLL ===
		Regular Season						Playoffs
Season	Team	GP	G	A	Pts	LB	PIM	GP	G	A	Pts	LB	PIM
2002	Washington	15	1	11	12	108	53	2	0	0	0	12	0
2003	Colorado	16	3	5	8	75	54	2	1	1	2	8	2
2004	Colorado	16	2	7	9	56	22	1	0	1	1	7	0
2005	Colorado	16	2	9	11	67	23	1	0	0	0	4	2
2006	Colorado	15	1	6	7	77	23	1	0	1	1	3	0
2007	Colorado	11	1	8	9	79	11	0	0	0	0	0	0
2008	Colorado	15	0	6	6	79	10	1	0	1	1	8	0
2009	Colorado	16	1	11	12	91	14	1	0	1	1	8	0
2010	Colorado	13	0	3	3	57	6	--	--	--	--	--	--
NLL totals		133	11	66	77	689	216	9	1	5	6	50	4
