= Kevin Leveille =

American lacrosse player

Personal information
- Nationality: American
- Born: August 18, 1981 (age 44) Delmar, New York, U.S.
- Height: 5 ft 10 in (178 cm)
- Weight: 185 lb (84 kg; 13 st 3 lb)

Sport
- Position: Attack
- NCAA team: UMass (2000-2003)
- NLL draft: 29th overall, 2003; Arizona Sting
- NLL teams: Chicago Shamrox
- MLL team Former teams: Chicago Machine; Boston Cannons
- Pro career: 2003–2014

Kevin Leveille (born August 18, 1981) is an American former professional lacrosse player from Delmar, New York. Prior to his retirement in 2014, Leveille played professionally for the Boston Cannons, Chicago Machine, and Rochester Rattlers. He played college lacrosse at UMass Amherst. Regarded as one of the greatest lacrosse players of all time, Leveille was a seven-time All-Star and two-time All-Pro. In 2025, he was inducted into the Professional Lacrosse Hall of Fame.

== College career ==
Leveille played college lacrosse at UMass from 2000 to 2003. At UMass, Leveille was a three-time USILA All-American.

Playing under head coach Greg Cannella, Leveille is one of the most notable players in UMass lacrosse history. Captaining the team in 2003 alongside Tom Fallon and Chris Fiore, Leveille helped lead the Minutemen to a 13–3 record, No. 5 final national ranking, and an appearance in the quarterfinals of the 2003 NCAA Division I men's lacrosse tournament.

Leveille's name as of 2025 still litters the UMass lacrosse record book. His 7 goals and 3 assists against Stony Brook on March 1, 2003, is still the most recent 10+ point game at UMass. He is also 9th in games played, 14th in points, and 10th in goals in program history.

== Professional career ==
=== MLL ===
He was a member of the Rochester Rattlers in Major League Lacrosse, playing the attack position. He was traded to Rochester Rattlers before the 2006 season started, and led the team in goals during its inaugural season.

Previously, Leveille had been a member of the Boston Cannons from 2003 to 2005. In 2004 he won the Major League Lacrosse Most Improved Player of the Year Award. In 2005 he played in the MLL All Star Game. The highlight of the 2005 Season was in Week 5 when he tied MLL record for goals in a game with 9 vs. BAL on July 31, 2005. After Rochester lost in the Steinfeld Cup, a couple days later he retired. Leveilles' number 19 is likely to be retired in the 2015 season.

=== NLL ===
Leveille also played professional indoor lacrosse for one season with the Chicago Shamrox of the National Lacrosse League during the team's inaugural 2007 season.

== Statistics ==
=== Major League Lacrosse ===
| | | Regular Season | | | | | | | Playoffs |
| Season | Team | GP | G | 2ptG | A | Pts | LB | PIM | GP | G | 2ptG | A | Pts | LB | PIM |
|---|---|---|---|---|---|---|---|---|---|---|---|---|---|---|---|
| 2004 | Boston | 12 | 28 | 1 | 12 | 41 | 10 | 2 | 2 | 5 | 0 | 0 | 5 | 1 | 2.5 |
| 2005 | Boston | 12 | 39 | 0 | 12 | 51 | 21 | 4 | 1 | 3 | 0 | 0 | 3 | 0 | 0 |
| 2006 | Chicago | 12 | 27 | 0 | 4 | 31 | 24 | 6 | -- | -- | -- | -- | -- | -- | -- |
| 2007 | Chicago | 11 | 36 | 0 | 8 | 44 | 26 | 3 | -- | -- | -- | -- | -- | -- | -- |
| 2008 | Chicago | 12 | 35 | 0 | 12 | 47 | 29 | 9 | -- | -- | -- | -- | -- | -- | -- |
| 2009 | Chicago | 12 | 35 | 1 | 8 | 44 | 14 | 9.5 | -- | -- | -- | -- | -- | -- | -- |
| MLL Totals | | 71 | 200 | 2 | 56 | 258 | 124 | 33.5 | 3 | 8 | 0 | 0 | 8 | 1 | 2.5 |

=== National Lacrosse League ===
| | | Regular Season | | | | | | Playoffs |
| Season | Team | GP | G | A | Pts | LB | PIM | GP | G | A | Pts | LB | PIM |
|---|---|---|---|---|---|---|---|---|---|---|---|---|---|
| 2007 | Chicago | 6 | 5 | 9 | 14 | 25 | 2 | -- | -- | -- | -- | -- | -- |
| NLL totals | | 6 | 5 | 9 | 14 | 25 | 2 | -- | -- | -- | -- | -- | -- |
