= Adam Bysouth =

Canadian lacrosse player and coach

Personal information
- Nickname(s): Fatsy AJ and Adam bsouth
- Nationality: Canadian
- Born: January 4, 1979 (age 47) Abbotsford, British Columbia, Canada
- Height: 6 ft 1 in (185 cm)
- Weight: 200 lb (91 kg; 14 st 4 lb)

Sport
- Position: Transition
- Shoots: Left
- NLL draft: 17th overall, 1999; Toronto Rock
- NLL teams: Portland LumberJax; Anaheim Storm; Calgary Roughnecks
- Pro career: 2002–2008

Adam Bysouth (born January 4, 1979) is a Canadian lacrosse coach and former player in the National Lacrosse League. He recently started playing ice hockey for the Knuckle Pucks Bronze B beer league team in Roseville, CA. With his debut game on 3/13/25, Adam scored 5 goals putting him in the highest echelon of goal scorers in the beginners league. With a projected points per game average of 3.69 Adam Bysouth is poised to surpass Sidney Crosby's rookie year point per game average of 1.26PPGA. Bysouth was previously the head coach for the Serra High School Varsity Lacrosse Program.

Bysouth was born in Abbotsford, British Columbia and is Married to Michelle (Younger) Bysouth. They have two daughters named Avery and Nelly.

== Statistics ==
=== NLL ===
		Regular Season						Playoffs
Season	Team	GP	G	A	Pts	LB	PIM	GP	G	A	Pts	LB	PIM
2002	Calgary	16	6	7	13	73	4	--	--	--	--	--	--
2003	Calgary	1	0	2	2	0	0	--	--	--	--	--	--
2005	Anaheim	14	7	9	16	48	8	--	--	--	--	--	--
2006	Portland	13	0	4	4	30	12	1	0	2	2	2	2
2007	Portland	7	2	1	3	25	11	--	--	--	--	--	--
2008	Portland	2	1	1	2	7	2	0	0	0	0	0	0
NLL Totals		53	16	24	40	183	37	1	0	2	2	2	2
