= Cam Bergman =

Canadian lacrosse player

Personal information
- Nationality: Canadian
- Born: January 14, 1983 (age 43) Coquitlam, British Columbia, Canada
- Height: 5 ft 10 in (178 cm)
- Weight: 170 lb (77 kg; 12 st 2 lb)

Sport
- Position: Defense
- Shoots: Left
- NLL draft: 19th overall, 2003; New Jersey Storm
- NLL team Former teams: Edmonton Rush; Anaheim Storm
- Pro career: 2004–2008

Cam Bergman (born January 14, 1983, in Coquitlam, British Columbia) was a Canadian lacrosse player who played for the Edmonton Rush in the National Lacrosse League. He was drafted by the Anaheim Storm in then the 2003 National Lacrosse League Entry Draft.

== Statistics ==
=== NLL ===
		Regular Season						Playoffs
Season	Team	GP	G	A	Pts	LB	PIM	GP	G	A	Pts	LB	PIM
2004	Anaheim	7	1	2	3	37	0	--	--	--	--	--	--
2005	Anaheim	9	3	6	9	52	9	--	--	--	--	--	--
2006	Edmonton	11	4	14	18	86	4	--	--	--	--	--	--
2007	Edmonton	9	1	1	2	11	6	--	--	--	--	--	--
2008	Edmonton	8	0	5	5	42	2	--	--	--	--	--	--
NLL totals		44	9	28	37	228	21	--	--	--	--	--	--
