= Bob McMahon =

American lacrosse coach

Bob McMahon is a former head coach in the National Lacrosse League, and currently serves as an assistant coach with the Vancouver Warriors.

Bob McMahon began his professional lacrosse coaching career as an assistant coach with the Detroit Turbos in 1992 and 1993. In 1999, McMahon was hired as an assistant coach to his friend Terry Sanderson in Albany, and was promoted to head coach following the 2001 season, when Sanderson left Albany to become head coach of the expansion Montreal Express. In the two years with Sanderson as head coach, the Attack finished with 6-6 and 5-9 records, but in McMahon's first year as head coach, Albany improved to a league-best 14-2 record. The Attack hosted the NLL Championship game, which they lost to the Toronto Rock, but McMahon was named 2002 NLL Coach of the Year (an award later renamed the Les Bartley Award). McMahon was also selected as coach of the South team in the 2002 NLL All-Star Game.

After a disappointing 8-8 2003 season, the Albany Attack franchise moved to San Jose, and McMahon found himself out of work again. He was hired by his former assistant coach in Albany, Bob Hamley, as an assistant coach of the new Arizona Sting franchise. After four years as an assistant coach in Arizona, McMahon was announced as the new head coach of the Colorado Mammoth in September 2007, after Gary Gait announced that he was stepping down. He was relieved of his duties on January 19, 2010 following an 0-2 start to the 2010 season. Just two months later, Bob Hamley was hired as the new Mammoth head coach, and in an interesting twist, he requested that the Mammoth re-hire McMahon to be one of his assistant coaches, which they did.

In 2004, McMahon was chosen to be an assistant coach for Canada's Heritage Cup team, which defeated Team USA 17-8.

McMahon has also coached in the Major Series Lacrosse league, leading the Brampton Excelsiors to the OLA Major title and a Mann Cup in 1998, and another OLA Major title in 1999.

Bob McMahon (left) and Herb Chorbajian after the final Albany Attack game. (Albany defeated the Vancouver Ravens in Albany on Saturday April 12, 2003.)

== NLL head coaching statistics ==
Team	Season	Regular Season				Playoffs				Playoff result
Team	Season	GC	W	L	W%	GC	W	L	W%	Playoff result
Albany Attack	2002	16	14	2	.875	2	1	1	.500	Lost Champions' Cup (TOR)
Albany Attack	2003	16	8	8	.500	–	–	–	–	Did not qualify
Colorado Mammoth	2007	16	9	7	.563	1	0	1	.000	Lost Division Semifinals (SJ)
Colorado Mammoth	2008	16	7	9	.438	1	0	1	.000	Lost Division Semifinals (CGY)
Colorado Mammoth	2010	2	0	2	.000	–	–	–	–	Fired
Totals:	5	66	38	28	.576	4	1	3	.250	

== Awards ==
Preceded by Tony Resch	NLL Coach of the Year Award; 2002	Succeeded by Darris Kilgour
