= Derek Malawsky =

Canadian lacrosse player

Personal information
- Nickname: D-Rock
- Born: September 6, 1973 (age 52) Coquitlam, British Columbia, Canada
- Height: 6 ft 0 in (183 cm)
- Weight: 175 lb (79 kg; 12 st 7 lb)

Sport
- Position: Forward
- Shoots: Left
- NLL draft: 11th overall, 1997; Ontario Raiders
- NLL team Former teams: Edmonton Rush; Portland LumberJax; Arizona Sting; San Jose Stealth; Rochester Knighthawks; Buffalo Bandits; Ontario Raiders
- Pro career: 1998–

Derek Malawsky (born September 6, 1973) is a retired Canadian lacrosse player, formerly with the Edmonton Rush in the National Lacrosse League. Derek's brother Curt also plays in the NLL, and the two have played together in Rochester, San Jose, and again in Arizona.

== Professional career ==
Malawsky was selected 11th overall in the 1997 National Lacrosse League draft by the Ontario Raiders out of Sonoma State University. He also played on the 2002 Canadian National Team.

After the cancellation and subsequent reinstatement of the 2008 season, the Arizona Sting and Boston Blazers announced that they would not be playing in 2008. A dispersal draft was held, and Malawsky was selected by the Portland LumberJax. When the Arizona Sting ceased operations prior to the 2009 NLL season, another dispersal draft was held, and Malawsky was again selected by the Portland LumberJax. On July 7, 2009, Malawsky was again selected in the Dispersal Draft, this time by the Philadelphia Wings as the 26th overall selection, but was subsequently traded by the Wings to the Edmonton Rush for Dan Teat.

== Statistics ==
=== NLL ===
		Regular Season						Playoffs
Season	Team	GP	G	A	Pts	LB	PIM	GP	G	A	Pts	LB	PIM
1998	Ontario	11	9	19	28	25	8	--	--	--	--	--	--
2000	Buffalo	12	28	33	61	109	25	1	1	3	4	12	6
2001	Buffalo	12	23	47	70	81	12	--	--	--	--	--	--
2002	Rochester	15	24	47	71	90	24	2	3	6	9	18	0
2003	Rochester	16	27	47	74	98	15	2	2	6	8	11	0
2004	Rochester	16	24	54	78	125	8	1	5	3	8	8	0
2005	San Jose	14	14	36	50	57	10	--	--	--	--	--	--
2006	San Jose	16	20	30	50	73	28	--	--	--	--	--	--
2007	Arizona	16	20	35	55	78	9	3	3	13	16	6	4
2008	Portland	16	25	35	60	71	15	--	--	--	--	--	--
2009	Portland	16	19	33	52	70	42	1	2	5	7	5	2
NLL totals		160	233	416	649	877	196	15	21	50	71	89	12
