= Rich Catton =

Canadian lacrosse player (born 1971)

Personal information
- Nationality: Canadian
- Born: September 1, 1971 (age 55) New Westminster, British Columbia, CA
- Height: 6 ft 1 in (185 cm)
- Weight: 215 lb (98 kg; 15 st 5 lb)

Sport
- Position: Defenseman
- Shoots: Right
- NLL team Former teams: Colorado Mammoth; Calgary Roughnecks; Vancouver Ravens; Buffalo Bandits
- WLA team Former teams: New Westminster Salmonbellies; Coquitlam Adanacs; Vancouver Burrards; Victoria Shamrocks
- Pro career: 2000–2010

Career highlights
- 2003 World Lacrosse Box Championships - Team Canada 2005 WLA Mann Cup - Victoria Shamrocks 2006 NLL Champion's Cup - Colorado Mammoth

Rich Catton (born September 1, 1971, in New Westminster, British Columbia) is a retired professional lacrosse player. He was inducted into the Canadian Lacrosse Hall of Fame in 2022.

Catton earned a gold medal with Team Canada at the first ever World Indoor Lacrosse Championship in 2003.

In his Western Lacrosse Association career, he played for the New Westminster Salmonbellies, Coquitlam Adanacs, Vancouver Burrards and Victoria Shamrocks. Winning the Mann Cup with the Shamrocks in 2005.

In his National Lacrosse League career, Catton played for the Buffalo Bandits (2000–2001), Vancouver Ravens (2002–2004), Calgary Roughnecks (2005), and Colorado Mammoth (2005–2010). Winning the NLL Champion's Cup with the Mammoth in 2006.

After retiring as a player, Catton transitioned into coaching and administration. He is currently the President of the New Westminster Minor Lacrosse Association. He has been involved in coaching at various levels within New Westminster minor lacrosse and previously served as the head coach for the Junior "A" Salmonbellies.

== Western Lacrosse Association (WLA) ==
Rich Catton had a stellar lacrosse career including playing four seasons for the New Westminster Junior “A” Salmonbellies.

His Senior career saw him suit up for New Westminster Salmonbellies, Coquitlam Adanacs, Vancouver Burrards and Victoria Shamrocks. Winning the Mann Cupp with the Shamrocks in 2005.

In his 337 games in the WLA, Catton recorded 254 points and 777 penalty minutes.

He was awarded Best Defensive Player with the Junior Salmonbellies in 1992; WLA Best Defensive Player with Maple Ridge in 1996; Selected to the WLA First All-Star team in 1996; Voted to the WLA Second All-Star team in 2003; Winner of the Wayne Goss Leadership Award in 2004; Selected as the WLA Unsung Hero Award in 2006.

== National Lacrosse League (NLL) ==
Rich Catton played with four teams during eleven seasons in the NLL which included winning an NLL Champions Cup. He was known for being an exceptionally reliable defensive player – the type of player any team would relish having on their roster. Catton played a key role in helping the Colorado Mammoths earn its first NLL Championship in 2006.

In his 150 games in the NLL, Catton recorded 67 points, 580 loose balls and 333 penalty minutes.

He played for the Buffalo Bandits (2000–2001), Vancouver Ravens (2002–2004), Calgary Roughnecks (2005), and Colorado Mammoth (2005–2010).

In 77 games with the Mammoth, Catton recorded 29 points, 284 loose balls and 171 penalty minutes throughout five seasons of play, adding to his NLL career figures of 69 points, 575 loose balls and 336 penalty minutes. In 155 regular season appearances. The defensemen added 4 points, 47 loose balls and eight penalty minutes in nine career postseason games played.

== International lacrosse career ==
Rich Catton represented Canada internationally. Playing on Team Canada and winning Gold at the first ever World Indoor Lacrosse Championship in 2003.

The 2003 World Indoor Lacrosse Championship were was held in Toronto, Ontario, Canada from May 15 to 24. Canada went through the six-team group without any losses. In the semifinals they beat Team USA. Canada won the gold medal with a 21–4 victory over the Iroquois Nationals and became the first ever World Indoor Lacrosse Champions.

== Statistics ==
=== NLL ===
| | | Regular Season | | | | | | Playoffs |
| Season | Team | GP | G | A | Pts | LB | PIM | GP | G | A | Pts | LB | PIM |
|---|---|---|---|---|---|---|---|---|---|---|---|---|---|
| 2000 | Buffalo Bandits | 7 | 2 | 3 | 5 | 17 | 4 | 1 | 0 | 0 | 0 | 4 | 2 |
| 2001 | Buffalo Bandits | 14 | 2 | 5 | 7 | 44 | 30 | -- | -- | -- | -- | -- | -- |
| 2002 | Vancouver Ravens | 16 | 3 | 8 | 11 | 63 | 37 | 1 | 0 | 0 | 0 | 5 | 0 |
| 2003 | Vancouver Ravens | 16 | 0 | 7 | 7 | 75 | 51 | 1 | 0 | 0 | 0 | 6 | 0 |
| 2004 | Vancouver Ravens | 16 | 1 | 5 | 6 | 57 | 35 | -- | -- | -- | -- | -- | -- |
| 2005 | Calgary Roughnecks | 9 | 0 | 4 | 4 | 35 | 8 | 1 | 1 | 0 | 1 | 8 | 2 |
| 2006 | Colorado Mammoth* | 16 | 1 | 6 | 7 | 68 | 24 | 3 | 0 | 2 | 2 | 15 | 2 |
| 2007 | Colorado Mammoth | 16 | 0 | 8 | 8 | 63 | 33 | 1 | 0 | 1 | 1 | 8 | 2 |
| 2008 | Colorado Mammoth | 16 | 1 | 2 | 3 | 54 | 55 | 1 | 0 | 0 | 0 | 1 | 0 |
| 2009 | Colorado Mammoth | 15 | 0 | 5 | 5 | 57 | 48 | 0 | 0 | 0 | 0 | 0 | 0 |
| 2010 | Colorado Mammoth | 14 | 1 | 5 | 6 | 42 | 11 | -- | -- | -- | -- | -- | -- |
| NLL totals | | 141 | 10 | 53 | 63 | 533 | 325 | 9 | 1 | 3 | 4 | 47 | 8 |

=== WLA ===
| | | Regular Season | | | | | Playoffs | | | | | Mann Cup |
| Season | Team | GP | G | A | Pts | PIM | GP | G | A | Pts | PIM | GP | G | A | Pts | PIM |
|---|---|---|---|---|---|---|---|---|---|---|---|---|---|---|---|---|
| 1992 | Burnaby Lakers | 2 | 1 | 0 | 1 | 0 | -- | -- | -- | -- | -- | -- | -- | -- | -- | -- |
| 1993 | Vancouver Burrards | 23 | 4 | 11 | 15 | 40 | -- | -- | -- | -- | -- | -- | -- | -- | -- | -- |
| 1994 | Surrey Burrards | 20 | 5 | 12 | 17 | 41 | 4 | 0 | 0 | 0 | 19 | -- | -- | -- | -- | -- |
| 1995 | Surrey Burrards | 25 | 7 | 10 | 17 | 70 | -- | -- | -- | -- | -- | -- | -- | -- | -- | -- |
| 1996 | Maple Ridge Burrards | 20 | 10 | 13 | 23 | 69 | 4 | 0 | 1 | 1 | 20 | -- | -- | -- | -- | -- |
| 1997 | Maple Ridge Burrards | 19 | 8 | 11 | 19 | 45 | 6 | 0 | 3 | 3 | 28 | -- | -- | -- | -- | -- |
| 1998 | Maple Ridge Burrards | 21 | 13 | 10 | 23 | 53 | 5 | 1 | 1 | 2 | 11 | -- | -- | -- | -- | -- |
| 1999 | New Westminster Salmonbellies | 22 | 8 | 11 | 19 | 51 | 4 | 0 | 4 | 4 | 23 | -- | -- | -- | -- | -- |
| 2000 | New Westminster Salmonbellies | 15 | 3 | 7 | 10 | 31 | 3 | 1 | 1 | 2 | 6 | -- | -- | -- | -- | -- |
| 2001 | New Westminster Salmonbellies | 18 | 8 | 17 | 25 | 31 | 4 | 0 | 7 | 7 | 9 | -- | -- | -- | -- | -- |
| 2002 | New Westminster Salmonbellies | 11 | 3 | 4 | 7 | 25 | 4 | 0 | 1 | 1 | 29 | -- | -- | -- | -- | -- |
| 2003 | New Westminster Salmonbellies | 13 | 4 | 14 | 18 | 23 | -- | -- | -- | -- | -- | -- | -- | -- | -- | -- |
| 2005 | Victoria Shamrocks* | 13 | 1 | 9 | 10 | 8 | 10 | 2 | 5 | 7 | 24 | 6 | 0 | 1 | 1 | 4 |
| 2006 | Victoria Shamrocks | 11 | 4 | 4 | 8 | 14 | 11 | 2 | 1 | 3 | 23 | 5 | 0 | 0 | 0 | 8 |
| 2007 | Coquitlam Adanacs | 7 | 1 | 3 | 4 | 4 | 10 | 0 | 2 | 2 | 23 | 6 | 1 | 2 | 3 | 16 |
| 2008 | Coquitlam Adanacs | 5 | 0 | 1 | 1 | 11 | 10 | 1 | 0 | 1 | 18 | -- | -- | -- | -- | -- |
| WLA totals | | 245 | 80 | 137 | 217 | 516 | 75 | 7 | 26 | 33 | 233 | 17 | 1 | 3 | 4 | 28 |
