= Curt Malawsky =

Canadian professional lacrosse player and coach

Personal information
- Nickname: Mouse
- Nationality: Canadian
- Born: May 10, 1970 (age 56) Coquitlam, British Columbia
- Height: 6 ft 1 in (185 cm)
- Weight: 175 lb (79 kg; 12 st 7 lb)

Sport
- Position: Forward
- Shoots: Right
- NLL teams: Calgary Roughnecks; Arizona Sting; San Jose Stealth; Vancouver Ravens; Rochester Knighthawks
- Pro career: 1998–2009

Curt Malawsky (born May 10, 1970 in Coquitlam, British Columbia) is a former box lacrosse player and currently the general manager and head coach of the Vancouver Warriors of the National Lacrosse League. Malawsky played for eleven seasons in the NLL and appeared in five Champion's Cup finals, three with Rochester, one with Arizona, and finally winning the title with Calgary in his final season in 2009. He was inducted into the Canadian Lacrosse Hall of Fame as a box player in 2015. In 2022, he was inducted into the Coquitlam Sports Hall of Fame.

Malawsky is also the coach of the Coquitlam Adanacs Jr. A lacrosse team. He led the Adanacs to the BC Junior A Lacrosse League title and won the Minto Cup national championship in 2010, for which he was named the British Columbia Lacrosse Association's Coach of the Year.

His brother Derek also played in the NLL, and the two played together in Rochester, San Jose, and in Arizona.

== Statistics ==
=== NLL ===
		Regular Season						Playoffs
Season	Team	GP	G	A	Pts	LB	PIM	GP	G	A	Pts	LB	PIM
1998	Rochester	11	17	24	41	55	16	1	5	1	6	5	2
1999	Rochester	12	16	18	34	57	4	2	4	4	8	12	0
2000	Rochester	12	22	29	51	58	6	2	1	1	2	11	4
2001	Rochester	14	25	34	59	55	2	1	3	1	4	6	0
2002	Rochester	16	31	29	60	58	19	2	2	1	3	7	2
2003	Rochester	9	23	15	38	37	9	2	4	2	6	12	4
2004	Vancouver	10	23	21	44	18	8	--	--	--	--	--	--
2005	San Jose	15	21	26	47	59	14	--	--	--	--	--	--
2006	San Jose	6	2	7	9	10	0	--	--	--	--	--	--
2006	Arizona	8	10	11	21	30	4	2	1	4	5	4	2
2007	Arizona	15	24	21	45	38	4	3	4	2	6	2	2
2008	Calgary	15	22	22	44	52	6	--	--	--	--	--	--
2009	Calgary	16	24	20	44	47	11	3	3	1	4	4	0
NLL totals		159	260	277	537	574	103	18	27	17	44	63	16

=== NLL head coaching statistics ===
Team	Season	Regular Season				Playoffs				Playoff result
Team	Season	GC	W	L	W%	GC	W	L	W%	Playoff result
Calgary Roughnecks	2013	16	9	7	.563	2	1	1	.500	Lost West Division Final (WSH)
Calgary Roughnecks	2014	18	12	6	.667	7	4	3	.571	Lost NLL Finals (ROC)
Calgary Roughnecks	2015	18	7	11	.389	4	2	2	.500	Lost Western Final (EDM)
Calgary Roughnecks	2016	18	8	10	.444	3	1	2	.333	Lost Western Final (SSK)
Calgary Roughnecks	2017	18	8	10	.444	–	–	–	–	Did not qualify
Calgary Roughnecks	2018	18	8	10	.444	2	1	1	.500	Lost Western Division Final (SSK)
Calgary Roughnecks	2019	18	10	8	.556	4	4	0	1.000	Won NLL Finals (BUF)
Calgary Roughnecks	2020	10	5	5	.500	–	–	–	–	Season suspended due to the COVID-19 pandemic
Calgary Roughnecks	2022	18	10	8	.556	1	0	1	.000	Lost Western Conference Semifinal (COL)
Calgary Roughnecks	2023	18	13	5	.722	4	2	2	.500	Lost Western Conference Finals (COL)
Vancouver Warriors	2024	18	8	10	.444	–	–	–	–	Did not qualify
Vancouver Warriors	2025	18	11	7	.611	3	1	2	.333	Lost NLL Semifinals (BUF)
Vancouver Warriors	2026	18	13	5	.722	1	0	1	.000	Lost Quarterfinals (HFX)
Totals:	13	224	122	102	.545	31	15	16	.484	
