= Brett Mydske =

Canadian lacrosse player

Personal information
- Born: July 30, 1988 (age 38) New Westminster, British Columbia, Canada
- Education: Limestone College
- Height: 6 ft 4 in (193 cm)
- Weight: 205 lb (93 kg; 14 st 9 lb)

Sport
- Position: Defense
- NLL draft: 25th overall, 2009; Edmonton Rush
- NLL team: Vancouver Warriors
- Pro career: 2010–

Brett Mydske (born July 30, 1988, in New Westminster, British Columbia) is a Canadian professional box lacrosse player for the Vancouver Warriors in the National Lacrosse League. Mydske was drafted in the third round (25th overall) in the 2009 NLL Entry Draft by the Rush.

== Statistics ==
=== NLL ===
		Regular Season						Playoffs
Season	Team	GP	G	A	Pts	LB	PIM	GP	G	A	Pts	LB	PIM
2010	Edmonton	15	4	6	10	67	32	2	0	0	0	6	2
2011	Edmonton	16	8	4	12	50	30	--	--	--	--	--	--
2012	Edmonton	16	4	3	7	48	18	3	0	2	2	7	0
2013	Edmonton	16	6	4	10	72	18	1	0	0	0	5	2
2014	Edmonton	18	4	5	9	58	22	3	0	0	0	2	0
2015	Edmonton	18	1	2	3	38	12	5	0	1	1	9	4
2016	Saskatchewan	18	2	9	11	70	12	4	1	1	2	14	0
2017	Saskatchewan	12	1	3	4	34	19	--	--	--	--	--	--
NLL totals		129	30	36	66	437	163	18	1	4	5	43	8
