= Colorado Mammoth =

NLL professional box lacrosse team based in Denver, Colorado

- Sport: Box lacrosse
- Founded: 2003
- League: National Lacrosse League
- Team history: Baltimore Thunder (1987–1999); Pittsburgh CrosseFire (2000); Washington Power (2001–2002)
- Based in: Denver, Colorado
- Arena: Ball Arena
- Colors: Burgundy and Black
- Owner: Kroenke Sports and Entertainment
- Head coach: Pat Coyle
- General manager: Brad Self
- League titles: 2 (2006, 2022)
- Conference titles: 2 (2022, 2023)
- Division titles: 3 (2003, 2004, 2007)
- Local media: Altitude Sports and Entertainment, KKFN
- PLPA representative: Dan Coates; Joey Cupido
- Website: coloradomammoth.com

The Colorado Mammoth are an American professional box lacrosse team based in Denver, Colorado, that competes in the National Lacrosse League (NLL). The team has played its home games at Ball Arena since the 2003 season. They are owned by Kroenke Sports and Entertainment, who is also the owner of the Colorado Avalanche, Denver Nuggets, the Colorado Rapids, Arsenal, and Los Angeles Angels.

The Mammoth franchise previously played as the Baltimore Thunder from 1987 to 1999, the Pittsburgh CrosseFire in 2000, and the Washington Power from 2001 to 2002. Up until the joining of the expansion team San Diego Seals, Colorado was the only non-Canadian team in the Western Division from 2014 to 2018. They have only missed the playoffs twice since moving to Colorado.

In 2004 and from 2006 to 2008, the Mammoth lead the league in attendance. 2006 was the first year in the 20-year history of the NLL that the league had an attendance of more than one million fans in one season. The Mammoth had the honor of hosting fan number one million. In 2008, the Mammoth average attendance per game was higher than Pepsi Center's other teams, the Colorado Avalanche (NHL) and the Denver Nuggets (NBA).

== 2006 champions ==
In the 2006 season, the Mammoth went to the playoffs in the #2 seed in the Western Division. Round one was hosted in Colorado against rivals Calgary. The Mammoth won 18–17 in overtime. Brian Langtry scored the overtime goal. Round two (Western Division finals) was also hosted at Pepsi Center against the Arizona Sting. Rookie Dan Carey scored the winning goal as the Mammoth defeated the Sting 13–12. The championship game was held at HSBC Arena in Buffalo against the Bandits who held the league's best record and the incumbent league MVP, goaltender Steve Dietrich . The Mammoth won the Champion's Cup by a score of 16–9, with Gavin Prout being named Game MVP.

== 2022 champions ==
The Mammoth won the National Lacrosse League Cup beating the Buffalo Bandits 2 games to 1, with Dillon Ward being named the Finals MVP. For the second time, the Mammoth won their championship in the Bandits' home arena, currently (2026) known as KeyBank Center.

== Notable players ==
- Gary Gait, who retired after the 2005 NLL season as the NLL's all-time scoring leader with 596 goals and 495 assists in 174 games (a record since surpassed by John Tavares). Gait also won the 2003 NLL MVP Award while with the Mammoth. On November 12, 2005, Gait was inducted into the NLL Hall of Fame, and on December 30, 2005, his number 22 jersey banner was hung from Pepsi Center rafters — the first NLL number ever to be retired and hung from any arena. Gait was the Mammoth head coach for the 2006 and 2007 seasons before stepping down in August 2007 to pursue other interests.
- Brian Langtry, who won the NLL Rookie of the Year Award in 2003, is well known for his all-out goal scoring attempts. Langtry retired after the 2011 season.
- Gord "Gee" Nash, who was the 2004 Goaltender of the Year.
- Gavin Prout, a crowd favorite who consistently puts up high numbers. Prout won the 2006 championship as team captain and the won Championship Game MVP. On October 31, 2009, to the outrage of many fans, Prout was traded to the Rochester Knighthawks, who in turn traded him to the Edmonton Rush on November 10. After a season and a half in Edmonton, Prout was traded back to the Mammoth in March 2011. In 2023, Prout was inducted into the Canadian Lacrosse Hall of Fame. He was selected as an NLL All-Star on seven occasions, and his Colorado Mammoth sweater (Number 9) was officially retired.
- Chris Gill, played a key offensive role in winning the 2006 championships. With 186 games, scored 589 points, and scored 1.9 goals a game in the NLL. In 2015, Chris Gill was inducted into the Canadian Lacrosse Hall of Fame. He joined as a fourth generation inductee after his great grandfather, grandfather and father. Returning to coach the Mammoths with Pat Coyle and Dan Stroup from 2015–2017.
- Pat Coyle signed with the Mammoths in 2005 and won the 2006 championship. Retired in 2008. Capturing the league’s first-ever Defensive Player of the Year honors in 2002, he was later named to the Mammoth’s All-Decade Team in 2012 and eventually became the first defenseman in NLL history to be inducted into the NLL Hall of Fame in 2014. In 2017, Pat Coyle was inducted into the Canadian Lacrosse Hall of Fame. Originally hired during the 2014 season to coach alongside Chris Gill and Dan Stroup as a collective unit, he was named head coach in 2018.
- Rich Catton played a key defensive role in helping the Mammoth earn its first NLL Championship in 2006. In 77 games with the Mammoth, Catton recorded 29 points (3g, 26a), 284 loose balls and 171 penalty minutes throughout five seasons of play, adding to his NLL career figures of 69 points (11g, 58a), 575 loose balls and 336 penalty minutes. In 2022, Rich Catton was inducted into the Canadian Lacrosse Hall of Fame.
- John Grant Jr., who was the 2012 NLL MVP. Retired in 2017.
- Joey Cupido, three time fan favorite award winner who was the 2015 and 2018 Transition Player of the Year.
- Dillon Ward, winner of the 2017 Goaltender of the Year Award . He played an essential role during the team's 2022 championship run and he was awarded the 2022 Finals MVP award.

== Awards and honors ==
Year	Player	Award
2003	Gary Gait	Most Valuable Player
2003	Brian Langtry	Rookie of the Year
2004	Steve Govett	Executive of the Year
2004	Gord Nash	Goaltender of the Year
2004	Gary Gait	Sportsmanship Award (tie with Peter Lough)
2005	Gary Gait	Sportsmanship Award
2006	Gavin Prout	Champion's Cup MVP
2012	Adam Jones	Rookie of the Year
2012	John Grant, Jr.	Most Valuable Player
2015	Joey Cupido	Transition Player of the Year
2017	Dillon Ward	Goaltender of the Year
2018	Joey Cupido	Transition Player of the Year
2022	Dillon Ward	Champion's Cup MVP

=== NLL Hall of Fame members ===
- Pat Coyle (Class of 2014)
- Dan Stroup (Class of 2010)
- Gary Gait (Class of 2006)
- Paul Gait (Class of 2006)
- Gavin Prout (Class of 2026)

=== Canadian Lacrosse Hall of Fame members ===
- Chris Gill (Class of 2015)
- Pat Coyle (Class of 2017)
- Rich Catton (Class of 2022)
- Gavin Prout (Class of 2023)

== Current roster ==
Colorado Mammoth roster
Active (21-man) roster		Inactive roster	Coaches
Goaltenders: 30 (Canada) Tyler Carlson; 45 (Canada) Dillon Ward; Defensemen: 13 (Canada) Brett Craig; 37 (Canada) Dan Coates (C); 82 (Canada) Joey Cupido (A); 27 (Canada) Scott Carnegie; 3 (United States) Tim Edwards; 14 (Canada) Warren Jeffrey; 23 (Canada) Jordan Gilles; 18 (Canada) Robert Hope (A); 86 (Canada) John Lintz; 4 (Canada) Josh Sullivan	Forwards: 67 (Canada) Kyle Killen; 55 (Canada) Dylan Kinnear; 16 (Canada) Ryan Lee; 51 (Canada) Eli McLaughlin; 2 (Canada) Will Malcom; 20 (Canada) Jacob Ruest; 17 (Canada) Chris Wardle; 7 (Canada) Tyler Digby	Practice squad: 41 (Canada) Erik Turner; 15 (Canada) Ilija Gajic; 91 (Canada) Jake McNabb; 71 (Canada) Jeff Wittig; Holdout: 84 (United States) Dylan Molloy	Head coach: Pat Coyle; Assistant coaches: Andrew McBride; Shawn Williams; Legend: * Suspended list; (C) Captain; (A) Alternate captain; Roster updated 2018-01-02; NLL Transactions

== All-time record ==
Season	Division/Conference (Note: Conference play began in the 2022 season)	W–L	Finish	Home	Road	GF	GA	Coach	Playoffs
2003	Eastern	9–7	1st	6–2	3–5	226	223	Rod Jensen/Jamie Batley	Lost Division Final
2004	Western	13–3	1st	7–1	6–2	223	173	Jamie Batley	Lost Division Final
2005	Western	8–8	3rd	5–3	3–5	201	182	Jamie Batley	Lost Division Semi-Final
2006	Western	10–6	2nd	6–2	4–4	200	172	Gary Gait	Won Championship
2007	Western	12–4	1st	7–1	5–3	209	179	Gary Gait	Lost Division Semi-Final
2008	Western	9–7	2nd	6–2	3–5	184	162	Bob McMahon	Lost Division Semi-Final
2009	Western	7–9	4th	4–4	3–5	172	184	Bob McMahon	Lost Division Semi-Final
2010	Western	4–12	5th	0–8	4–4	167	201	Bob McMahon/Steve Govett/Bob Hamley	Did Not Qualify
2011	Western	5–11	4th	3–5	2–6	151	172	Bob Hamley	Lost Division Semi-Final
2012	Western	11–5	2nd	5–3	6–2	217	201	Bob Hamley	Lost Division Semi-Final
2013	Western	7–9	4th	3–5	4–4	185	202	Bob Hamley	Lost Division Semi-Final
2014	Western	8–10	3rd	4–5	4–5	201	228	Bob Hamley/Pat Coyle/Chris Gill/Dan Stroup	Lost Division Semi-Final
2015	Western	9–9	3rd	6–3	3–6	212	218	Pat Coyle/Chris Gill/Dan Stroup	Lost Division Semi-Final
2016	Western	12–6	2nd	8–1	4–5	203	202	Pat Coyle/Chris Gill/Dan Stroup	Lost Division Semi-Final
2017	Western	9–9	3rd	5–4	4–5	202	199	Pat Coyle/Chris Gill/Dan Stroup	Lost Division Final
2018	Western	11–7	2nd	5–4	6–3	214	199	Pat Coyle	Lost Division Semi-Final
2019	Western	6–12	4th	3–6	3–6	181	193	Pat Coyle	Lost Division Final
2020	Western	7–6	2nd	4–2	3–4	128	125	Pat Coyle	No playoffs held
2021	Western	Season cancelled due to COVID-19 pandemic							
2022	Western	10–8	3rd	7–2	3–6	196	198	Pat Coyle	Won Championship
2023	Western	9–9	4th	7–2	2–7	190	208	Pat Coyle	Lost Championship
2024	Unified	5–13	15th	4-5	1-8	193	226	Pat Coyle	Did Not Qualify
2025	Unified	8–10	10th	4–5	4–5	195	212	Pat Coyle	Did Not Qualify
2026	Unified	12–6	2nd	7–2	5–4	206	179	Pat Coyle	Lost Quarterfinals
Total	23 seasons	201–186		116–77	84–109	4,456	4,438		
Playoff totals	19 appearances	15–22		6–10	9–12	424	457	2 Championships	

== Playoff results ==
Season	Game	Visiting	Home
2003	Quarterfinals	Vancouver 12	Colorado 15
2003	Semifinals	Colorado 11	Toronto 15
2004	Division Finals	Calgary 13	Colorado 11
2005	Division Semifinals	Colorado 13	Arizona 16
2006	Division Semifinals	Calgary 17	Colorado 18
2006	Division Finals	Arizona 12	Colorado 13
2006	Championship	Colorado 16	Buffalo 9
2007	Division Semifinals	San Jose 15	Colorado 14 (OT)
2008	Division Semifinals	Calgary 15	Colorado 13
2009	Division Semifinals	Colorado 8	Calgary 15
2011	Division Semifinals	Colorado 6	Calgary 10
2012	Division Semifinals	Minnesota 14	Colorado 10
2013	Division Semifinals	Colorado 10	Calgary 15
2014	Division Semifinals	Colorado 15	Calgary 16 (OT)
2015	Division Semifinals	Calgary 11	Colorado 6
2016	Division Semifinals	Calgary 11	Colorado 10 (OT)
2017	Division Semifinals	Colorado 13	Vancouver 12
2017	Western Finals (Game 1)	Saskatchewan 18	Colorado 9
2017	Western Finals (Game 2)	Colorado 10	Saskatchewan 11
2018	Division Semifinals	Calgary 15	Colorado 12
2019	Division Semifinals	Colorado 11	Saskatchewan 10 (OT)
2019	Western Division Final	Colorado 4	Calgary 8
2022	Western Conference Semifinals	Colorado 16	Calgary 12
2022	Western Conference Finals Game 1	Colorado 14	San Diego 12
2022	Western Conference Finals Game 2	San Diego 11	Colorado 10
2022	Western Conference Finals Game 3	Colorado 15	San Diego 13
2022	NLL Finals Game 1	Colorado 14	Buffalo 15
2022	NLL Finals Game 2	Buffalo 8	Colorado 11
2022	NLL Finals Game 3	Colorado 10	Buffalo 8
2023	Western Conference Semifinals	Colorado 13	San Diego 12
2023	Western Conference Finals Game 1	Calgary 7	Colorado 8
2023	Western Conference Finals Game 2	Colorado 12	Calgary 13
2023	Western Conference Finals Game 3	Colorado 9	Calgary 7
2023	NLL Finals Game 1	Colorado 12	Buffalo 13
2023	NLL Finals Game 2	Buffalo 10	Colorado 16
2023	NLL Finals Game 3	Colorado 4	Buffalo 13
2026	Quarterfinals	San Diego 13	Colorado 12 (OT)

== Head coaching history ==
#	Name	Term	Regular season				Playoffs			
#	Name	Term	GC	W	L	W%	GC	W	L	W%
1	Rod Jensen	2003	9	4	5	.444	–	–	–	–
2	Jamie Batley	2003–2005	39	26	13	.667	4	1	3	.250
3	Gary Gait	2006–2007	32	22	10	.688	4	3	1	.750
4	Bob McMahon	2008–2010	34	16	18	.471	2	0	2	.000
5	Steve Govett	2010	7	2	5	.286	–	–	–	–
6	Bob Hamley	2010–2014	66	29	37	.440	3	0	3	.000
7	Pat Coyle, Chris Gill, Dan Stroup	2015–2017	54	30	24	.556	5	1	4	.200
8	Pat Coyle	2018–	139	68	71	.489	17	10	7	.588

== See also ==
- Colorado Mammoth seasons

== Notes ==
Preceded by None	Major Indoor Lacrosse League Champions; 1987	Succeeded by New Jersey Saints
Preceded by Toronto Rock	National Lacrosse League Champions; 2006	Succeeded by Rochester Knighthawks
