= 2009 Philadelphia Wings season =

2009 Philadelphia Wings
- League: NLL
- Division: 5th East
- 2009 record: 7–9
- Home record: 4–4
- Road record: 3–5
- Goals for: 188
- Goals against: 193
- General Manager: Lindsay Sanderson
- Coach: Dave Huntley
- Captain: Thomas Hajek
- Alternate captains: Shawn Nadelen; Geoff Snider
- Arena: Wachovia Center
- Average attendance: 9,691

Team leaders
- Goals: Merrick Thomson (40)
- Assists: Mat Giles (47)
- Points: Mat Giles (70)
- Penalties in minutes: Geoff Snider (53)
- Loose Balls: Geoff Snider (220)
- Wins: Brandon Miller (6)
- Goals against average: Rob Blasdell (11.84)

The Philadelphia Wings are a lacrosse team based in Philadelphia, Pennsylvania playing in the National Lacrosse League (NLL). The 2009 season was the 23rd in franchise history.

== Regular season ==
=== Conference standings ===
East Division
| P | Team | GP | W | L | PCT | GB | Home | Road | GF | GA | Diff | GF/GP | GA/GP |
|---|---|---|---|---|---|---|---|---|---|---|---|---|---|
| 1 | New York Titans – xy | 16 | 10 | 6 | .625 | 0.0 | 5–3 | 5–3 | 190 | 180 | +10 | 11.88 | 11.25 |
| 2 | Buffalo Bandits – x | 16 | 10 | 6 | .625 | 0.0 | 5–3 | 5–3 | 223 | 170 | +53 | 13.94 | 10.62 |
| 3 | Boston Blazers – x | 16 | 10 | 6 | .625 | 0.0 | 4–4 | 6–2 | 181 | 168 | +13 | 11.31 | 10.50 |
| 4 | Rochester Knighthawks – x | 16 | 7 | 9 | .438 | 3.0 | 6–2 | 1–7 | 169 | 197 | −28 | 10.56 | 12.31 |
| 5 | Philadelphia Wings | 16 | 7 | 9 | .438 | 3.0 | 4–4 | 3–5 | 188 | 193 | −5 | 11.75 | 12.06 |
| 6 | Toronto Rock | 16 | 6 | 10 | .375 | 4.0 | 3–5 | 3–5 | 194 | 218 | −24 | 12.12 | 13.62 |

West Division
| P | Team | GP | W | L | PCT | GB | Home | Road | GF | GA | Diff | GF/GP | GA/GP |
|---|---|---|---|---|---|---|---|---|---|---|---|---|---|
| 1 | Calgary Roughnecks – xyz | 16 | 12 | 4 | .750 | 0.0 | 5–3 | 7–1 | 206 | 167 | +39 | 12.88 | 10.44 |
| 2 | Portland LumberJax – x | 16 | 9 | 7 | .562 | 3.0 | 4–4 | 5–3 | 181 | 177 | +4 | 11.31 | 11.06 |
| 3 | San Jose Stealth – x | 16 | 7 | 9 | .438 | 5.0 | 5–3 | 2–6 | 200 | 185 | +15 | 12.50 | 11.56 |
| 4 | Colorado Mammoth – x | 16 | 7 | 9 | .438 | 5.0 | 4–4 | 3–5 | 172 | 184 | −12 | 10.75 | 11.50 |
| 5 | Minnesota Swarm | 16 | 6 | 10 | .375 | 6.0 | 2–6 | 4–4 | 174 | 198 | −24 | 10.88 | 12.38 |
| 6 | Edmonton Rush | 16 | 5 | 11 | .312 | 7.0 | 4–4 | 1–7 | 159 | 200 | −41 | 9.94 | 12.50 |

x: Clinched playoff berth; c: Clinched playoff berth by crossing over to another division; y: Clinched division; z: Clinched best regular season record; GP: Games Played
W: Wins; L: Losses; GB: Games back; PCT: Win percentage; Home: Record at Home; Road: Record on the Road; GF: Goals scored; GA: Goals allowed
Differential: Difference between goals scored and allowed; GF/GP: Average number of goals scored per game; GA/GP: Average number of goals allowed per game

=== Game log ===
| Game | Date | Opponent | Location | Score | OT | Attendance | Record |
|---|---|---|---|---|---|---|---|
| 1 | January 3, 2009 | @ Buffalo Bandits | HSBC Arena | L 11–15 | | 18,690 | 0–1 |
| 2 | January 10, 2009 | @ Rochester Knighthawks | Blue Cross Arena | W 16–13 | | 7,422 | 1–1 |
| 3 | January 23, 2009 | Boston Blazers | Wachovia Center | L 11–13 | | 9,462 | 1–2 |
| 4 | January 24, 2009 | @ Boston Blazers | TD Banknorth Garden | L 7–11 | | 4,423 | 1–3 |
| 5 | February 6, 2009 | Buffalo Bandits | Wachovia Center | W 13–11 | | 10,506 | 2–3 |
| 6 | February 8, 2009 | @ New York Titans | Prudential Center | L 12–15 | | 4,231 | 2–4 |
| 7 | February 13, 2009 | Boston Blazers | Wachovia Center | L 4–8 | | 9,006 | 2–5 |
| 8 | February 21, 2009 | Minnesota Swarm | Wachovia Center | W 13–12 | | 10,559 | 3–5 |
| 9 | February 27, 2009 | @ Edmonton Rush | Rexall Place | W 14–9 | | 14,710 | 4–5 |
| 10 | February 28, 2009 | @ Portland LumberJax | Rose Garden | L 10–12 | | 8,560 | 4–6 |
| 11 | March 14, 2009 | Minnesota Swarm | Wachovia Center | L 12–13 | | 10,160 | 4–7 |
| 12 | March 28, 2009 | Colorado Mammoth | Wachovia Center | W 17–13 | | 11,876 | 5–7 |
| 13 | April 4, 2009 | @ New York Titans | Prudential Center | W 11–7 | | 4,187 | 6–7 |
| 14 | April 5, 2009 | New York Titans | Wachovia Center | L 13–16 | | 10,806 | 6–8 |
| 15 | April 11, 2009 | Toronto Rock | Wachovia Center | W 16–14 | | 11,924 | 7–8 |
| 16 | April 18, 2009 | @ Rochester Knighthawks | Blue Cross Arena | L 8–11 | | 8,539 | 7–9 |

== Player stats ==
=== Runners (Top 10) ===
Note: GP = Games played; G = Goals; A = Assists; Pts = Points; LB = Loose balls; PIM = Penalty minutes

| Player | GP | G | A | Pts | LB | PIM |
|---|---|---|---|---|---|---|
| Mat Giles | 16 | 23 | 47 | 70 | 78 | 33 |
| Merrick Thomson | 15 | 40 | 29 | 69 | 70 | 2 |
| Kyle Wailes | 14 | 15 | 41 | 56 | 43 | 8 |
| Drew Westervelt | 16 | 34 | 20 | 54 | 72 | 16 |
| Athan Iannucci | 10 | 22 | 14 | 36 | 38 | 10 |
| Geoff Snider | 14 | 12 | 22 | 34 | 220 | 53 |
| Kyle Sweeney | 16 | 7 | 18 | 25 | 130 | 6 |
| David Mitchell | 8 | 6 | 12 | 18 | 41 | 0 |
| A.J. Shannon | 7 | 7 | 10 | 17 | 15 | 2 |
| Totals | | 294 | 482 | 297 | 1201 | 35 |

=== Goaltenders ===
Note: GP = Games played; MIN = Minutes; W = Wins; L = Losses; GA = Goals against; Sv% = Save percentage; GAA = Goals against average

| Player | GP | MIN | W | L | GA | Sv% | GAA |
|---|---|---|---|---|---|---|---|
| Brandon Miller | 14 | 569:39 | 6 | 4 | 113 | .769 | 11.90 |
| Rob Blasdell | 16 | 390:07 | 1 | 5 | 77 | .769 | 11.84 |
| Mickey Hover | 1 | 0:00 | 0 | 0 | 0 | .000 | .00 |
| Totals | | | 7 | 9 | 193 | .766 | 12.06 |

== Transactions ==
=== Players not returning ===
- Jake Bergey – lost in the 2008 expansion draft
- Johnny Christmas – taking the year to focus on work with a lacrosse non-profit organization
- Jason Crosbie – lost to free agency (Toronto)
- Peter Jacobs – retired
- Jay Preece – lost to free agency (Colorado)
- Jamie Rooney – lost in the 2008 dispersal draft

=== Entry draft ===
The 2008 NLL Entry Draft took place on September 7, 2008. The Wings selected the following players:

| Round | Overall | Player | College/Club |
|---|---|---|---|
| 1 | 9 | Sean Thomson | Bellarmine University |
| 2 | 25 | Matt Bocklet | Johns Hopkins University |
| 3 | 36 | Mike Leveille | Syracuse University |
| 4 | 45 | Matt Lalli | Colgate University |
| 4 | 47 | Jordan Levine | University at Albany |
| 5 | 58 | Jerry Lambe | Georgetown University |
| 5 | 60 | Tony McDevitt | Duke University |
| 6 | 71 | Steve Grossi | Drexel University |

== Roster ==
2009 Philadelphia Wings roster
| Active (21-man) roster | | Inactive roster | Coaches |
|---|---|---|---|
| Goaltenders: 31 (Canada) Rob Blasdell; 36 (Canada) Brandon Miller; Defensemen: 5 (United States) George Castle; 37 (United States) Benson Erwin; 28 (Canada) Thomas Hajek (C); 25 (United States) Pat Heim; 34 (United States) Shawn Nadelen (A); 55 (United States) Steve Panarelli; 7 (United States) Kyle Sweeney; 24 (Canada) Sean Thomson; 44 (Canada) Taylor Wray | Forwards: 27 (Canada) Mat Giles; 6 (Canada) Jon Harasym; 23 (Canada) Athan Iannucci; 22 (Canada) David Mitchell; 8 (Canada) A.J. Shannon; 9 (Canada) Merrick Thomson; 88 (Canada) Kyle Wailes; 26 (United States) Drew Westervelt; Transition: 10 (United States) Matt Bocklet; 17 (United States) Jordan Levine; 4 (Canada) Geoff Snider (A); 77 (Canada) Rob Van Beek | Practice squad: 70 (United States) Mickey Hover; Injured reserve: 45 (United States) Kyle Fiat; -- (United States) Steve Grossi; Restricted list: 1 (United States) Johnny Christmas; 15 (United States) Brett Moyer | Head coach {{{Head Coach}}} Legend: * Suspended list; (C) Captain; (A) Alternate captain; NLL Transactions |

== See also ==
- 2009 NLL season
