= 2009 Toronto Rock season =

2009 Toronto Rock
- League: NLL
- Division: 6th East
- 2009 record: 6-10
- Home record: 3-5
- Road record: 3-5
- Goals for: 194
- Goals against: 218
- General Manager: Mike Kloepfer
- Coach: Jamie Batley; Glenn Clark
- Captain: Chris Driscoll
- Alternate captains: Blaine Manning; Lewis Ratcliff
- Arena: Air Canada Centre
- Average attendance: 13,922

Team leaders
- Goals: Lewis Ratcliff (34)
- Assists: Blaine Manning (42)
- Points: Luke Wiles (69)
- Penalties in minutes: Craig Conn (52)
- Loose Balls: Rob Marshall (116)
- Wins: Bob Watson (6)
- Goals against average: Bob Watson (13.16)

The Toronto Rock are a lacrosse team based in Toronto playing in the National Lacrosse League (NLL). The 2009 season was the 13th in franchise history, and 12th as the Rock.

On November 6, 2008, the Rock announced that veteran Chris Driscoll would be the new team captain, replacing the retired Jim Veltman.

Only three games into the season, the Rock fired head coach Glenn Clark and assistant coach Terry Bullen and hired former Chicago Shamrox and Colorado Mammoth coach Jamie Batley as the new head coach. Assistant coach Jim Veltman was relieved of his coaching duties, but remained with the Rock as an advisor.

After winning their first game of the season, the Rock won only once in their next eight games before a three-game winning streak gave fans some hope that the season was not lost. However, three straight losses forced the Rock out of the playoffs for the second straight year. Rock President Brad Watters said that the team "drastically under-delivered", and vowed to make whatever changes were necessary to fix the team.

== Regular season ==
=== Conference standings ===
East Division
P	Team	GP	W	L	PCT	GB	Home	Road	GF	GA	Diff	GF/GP	GA/GP
1	New York Titans – xy	16	10	6	.625	0.0	5–3	5–3	190	180	+10	11.88	11.25
2	Buffalo Bandits – x	16	10	6	.625	0.0	5–3	5–3	223	170	+53	13.94	10.62
3	Boston Blazers – x	16	10	6	.625	0.0	4–4	6–2	181	168	+13	11.31	10.50
4	Rochester Knighthawks – x	16	7	9	.438	3.0	6–2	1–7	169	197	−28	10.56	12.31
5	Philadelphia Wings	16	7	9	.438	3.0	4–4	3–5	188	193	−5	11.75	12.06
6	Toronto Rock	16	6	10	.375	4.0	3–5	3–5	194	218	−24	12.12	13.62

West Division
P	Team	GP	W	L	PCT	GB	Home	Road	GF	GA	Diff	GF/GP	GA/GP
1	Calgary Roughnecks – xyz	16	12	4	.750	0.0	5–3	7–1	206	167	+39	12.88	10.44
2	Portland LumberJax – x	16	9	7	.562	3.0	4–4	5–3	181	177	+4	11.31	11.06
3	San Jose Stealth – x	16	7	9	.438	5.0	5–3	2–6	200	185	+15	12.50	11.56
4	Colorado Mammoth – x	16	7	9	.438	5.0	4–4	3–5	172	184	−12	10.75	11.50
5	Minnesota Swarm	16	6	10	.375	6.0	2–6	4–4	174	198	−24	10.88	12.38
6	Edmonton Rush	16	5	11	.312	7.0	4–4	1–7	159	200	−41	9.94	12.50

x: Clinched playoff berth; c: Clinched playoff berth by crossing over to another division; y: Clinched division; z: Clinched best regular season record; GP: Games Played
W: Wins; L: Losses; GB: Games back; PCT: Win percentage; Home: Record at Home; Road: Record on the Road; GF: Goals scored; GA: Goals allowed
Differential: Difference between goals scored and allowed; GF/GP: Average number of goals scored per game; GA/GP: Average number of goals allowed per game

=== Game log ===
Game	Date	Opponent	Location	Score	OT	Attendance	Record
1	January 3, 2009	@ New York Titans	BankAtlantic Center	W 15–14		5,733	1–0
2	January 10, 2009	Buffalo Bandits	Air Canada Centre	L 6–8		15,923	1–1
3	January 17, 2009	Calgary Roughnecks	Air Canada Centre	L 9–16		12,865	1–2
4	January 31, 2009	@ Rochester Knighthawks	Blue Cross Arena	L 11–13		7,088	1–3
5	February 7, 2009	Edmonton Rush	Air Canada Centre	W 16–9		13,468	2–3
6	February 14, 2009	@ Buffalo Bandits	HSBC Arena	L 10–25		18,690	2–4
7	February 20, 2009	Buffalo Bandits	Air Canada Centre	L 16–17	OT	12,844	2–5
8	February 27, 2009	Minnesota Swarm	Air Canada Centre	L 10–13		13,324	2–6
9	February 28, 2009	Rochester Knighthawks	Air Canada Centre	L 10–18		6,739	2–7
10	March 14, 2009	@ Boston Blazers	TD Banknorth Garden	W 9–8	OT	6,485	3–7
11	March 21, 2009	Rochester Knighthawks	Air Canada Centre	W 16–10		14,812	4–7
12	March 27, 2009	@ Calgary Roughnecks	Pengrowth Saddledome	W 12–10		10,586	5–7
13	March 28, 2009	@ Edmonton Rush	Rexall Place	L 12–16		7,356	5–8
14	April 3, 2009	Boston Blazers	Air Canada Centre	L 13–14		12,884	5–9
15	April 11, 2009	@ Philadelphia Wings	Wachovia Center	L 14–16		11,924	5–10
16	April 18, 2009	San Jose Stealth	Air Canada Centre	W 15–11		15,252	6–10

== Player stats ==
=== Runners (Top 10) ===
Note: GP = Games played; G = Goals; A = Assists; Pts = Points; LB = Loose balls; PIM = Penalty minutes

Player	GP	G	A	Pts	LB	PIM
Luke Wiles	16	33	36	69	76	8
Lewis Ratcliff	16	34	34	68	68	8
Blaine Manning	16	20	42	62	68	22
Jason Crosbie	15	12	38	50	83	6
Kasey Beirnes	15	23	15	38	86	12
Craig Conn	11	14	18	32	68	52
Rob Marshall	16	8	15	23	116	8
Chris Driscoll	16	7	15	22	104	20
Bill McGlone	11	8	9	17	49	4
Totals		289	483	347	1126	31

=== Goaltenders ===
Note: GP = Games played; MIN = Minutes; W = Wins; L = Losses; GA = Goals against; Sv% = Save percentage; GAA = Goals against average

Player	GP	MIN	W	L	GA	Sv%	GAA
Bob Watson	16	820:46	6	8	180	.745	13.16
Steve Dietrich	4	48:39	0	1	11	.800	13.57
Mike Attwood	8	46:31	0	0	16	.600	20.64
Curtis Palidwor	1	45:26	0	1	10	.615	13.21
Totals			6	10	218	.736	13.63

== Transactions ==
=== New players ===
- Craig Conn - acquired in dispersal draft
- Jason Crosbie - signed as free agent
- Stephen Hoar - acquired in trade
- Luke Wiles - acquired in trade

=== Players not returning ===
- Mike Poulin - taken in expansion draft
- Jamie Taylor - released
- Matt Taylor - released
- Jim Veltman - retired

=== Trades ===
March 17, 2009	To Toronto Rock Steve Dietrich	To Edmonton Rush Second round pick, 2009 entry draft
March 7, 2009	To Toronto Rock Second round pick, 2010 entry draft	To Colorado Mammoth Curtis Palidwor
February 26, 2009	To Toronto Rock Curtis Palidwor	To Colorado Mammoth Second round pick, 2010 entry draft
January 14, 2009	To Toronto Rock First round pick, 2009 entry draft Second round pick, 2010 entry draft	To Edmonton Rush Ryan Benesch; Derek Suddons
September 7, 2008	To Toronto Rock Luke Wiles; Stephen Hoar	To Rochester Knighthawks Aaron Wilson first round pick, 2009 entry draft (from Toronto)	To San Jose Stealth first round pick, 2008 entry draft (from Rochester)

=== Entry draft ===
The 2008 NLL Entry Draft took place on September 7, 2008. The Rock selected the following players:

Round	Overall	Player	College/Club
2	17	Mike Fleming	Robert Morris College
3	28	Nick Rose	Orangeville, ON
5	53	Derrick Gordon	Orillia, ON
6	66	Tommy Hurley	Burlington, ON

== Roster ==
2009 Toronto Rock roster
Active (21-man) roster		Inactive roster	Coaches
Goaltenders: 1 (Canada) Steve Dietrich; 29 (Canada) Bob Watson; Defensemen: 37 (Canada) Scott Campbell; 23 (Canada) Matt Carroll; 93 (Canada) Chris Driscoll (C); 4 (Canada) Jeff Gilbert; 44 (Canada) Stephen Hoar; 25 (Canada) Mike Hobbins; 27 (Canada) Peter Lough; 14 (Canada) Rob Marshall; 22 (Canada) Cam Woods	Forwards: 33 (Canada) Kasey Beirnes; 20 (Canada) Jason Clark; 8 (Canada) Craig Conn; 54 (Canada) Jason Crosbie; 81 (Canada) Michael Fleming; 16 (Canada) Blaine Manning (A); 10 (United States) Bill McGlone; 42 (Canada) Lewis Ratcliff (A); 5 (Canada) Mark Scherman; 18 (Canada) Josh Wasson; 15 (Canada) Luke Wiles; Transition: 12 (Canada) Chad Thompson	Practice squad: 43 (Canada) Mike Attwood; 0 (Canada) Derrick Gordon; Injured reserve: 17 (Canada) Nick Carson	Head coach {{{Head Coach}}} Legend: * Suspended list; (C) Captain; (A) Alternate captain; NLL Transactions

== See also ==
- 2009 NLL season
