= 2009 Edmonton Rush season =

2009 Edmonton Rush
- League: NLL
- Division: 6th West
- 2009 record: 5-11
- Home record: 4-4
- Road record: 1-7
- Goals for: 159
- Goals against: 200
- General Manager: Bob Hamley
- Coach: Bob Hamley
- Captain: Chris McElroy
- Alternate captains: Jimmy Quinlan; Rory Glaves
- Arena: Rexall Place
- Average attendance: 8,347

Team leaders
- Goals: Dan Teat (28)
- Assists: Dan Teat (41)
- Points: Dan Teat (69)
- Penalties in minutes: Ryan McNish (44)
- Loose Balls: Ian Hawksbee (150)
- Wins: Chris Levis (4)
- Goals against average: Chris Levis (11.27)

The Edmonton Rush are a lacrosse team based in Edmonton playing in the National Lacrosse League (NLL). The 2009 season was the 4th in franchise history.

== Regular season ==
=== Conference standings ===
East Division
P	Team	GP	W	L	PCT	GB	Home	Road	GF	GA	Diff	GF/GP	GA/GP
1	New York Titans – xy	16	10	6	.625	0.0	5–3	5–3	190	180	+10	11.88	11.25
2	Buffalo Bandits – x	16	10	6	.625	0.0	5–3	5–3	223	170	+53	13.94	10.62
3	Boston Blazers – x	16	10	6	.625	0.0	4–4	6–2	181	168	+13	11.31	10.50
4	Rochester Knighthawks – x	16	7	9	.438	3.0	6–2	1–7	169	197	−28	10.56	12.31
5	Philadelphia Wings	16	7	9	.438	3.0	4–4	3–5	188	193	−5	11.75	12.06
6	Toronto Rock	16	6	10	.375	4.0	3–5	3–5	194	218	−24	12.12	13.62

West Division
P	Team	GP	W	L	PCT	GB	Home	Road	GF	GA	Diff	GF/GP	GA/GP
1	Calgary Roughnecks – xyz	16	12	4	.750	0.0	5–3	7–1	206	167	+39	12.88	10.44
2	Portland LumberJax – x	16	9	7	.562	3.0	4–4	5–3	181	177	+4	11.31	11.06
3	San Jose Stealth – x	16	7	9	.438	5.0	5–3	2–6	200	185	+15	12.50	11.56
4	Colorado Mammoth – x	16	7	9	.438	5.0	4–4	3–5	172	184	−12	10.75	11.50
5	Minnesota Swarm	16	6	10	.375	6.0	2–6	4–4	174	198	−24	10.88	12.38
6	Edmonton Rush	16	5	11	.312	7.0	4–4	1–7	159	200	−41	9.94	12.50

x: Clinched playoff berth; c: Clinched playoff berth by crossing over to another division; y: Clinched division; z: Clinched best regular season record; GP: Games Played
W: Wins; L: Losses; GB: Games back; PCT: Win percentage; Home: Record at Home; Road: Record on the Road; GF: Goals scored; GA: Goals allowed
Differential: Difference between goals scored and allowed; GF/GP: Average number of goals scored per game; GA/GP: Average number of goals allowed per game

=== Game log ===
Game	Date	Opponent	Location	Score	OT	Attendance	Record
1	January 10, 2009	@ Calgary Roughnecks	Pengrowth Saddledome	L 9–10	OT	11,197	0–1
2	January 16, 2009	Portland LumberJax	Rexall Place	W 11–10		8,017	1–1
3	January 23, 2009	@ Portland LumberJax	Rose Garden	L 10–15		6,894	1–2
4	January 24, 2009	@ Colorado Mammoth	Pepsi Center	W 11–9		16,734	2–2
5	January 29, 2009	Buffalo Bandits	Rexall Place	L 8–13		6,298	2–3
6	January 31, 2009	@ San Jose Stealth	HP Pavilion at San Jose	L 6–16		3,256	2–4
7	February 7, 2009	@ Toronto Rock	Air Canada Centre	L 9–16		13,468	2–5
8	February 22, 2009	Colorado Mammoth	Rexall Place	W 10–9		7,249	3–5
9	February 27, 2009	Philadelphia Wings	Rexall Place	L 9–14		14,710	3–6
10	March 13, 2009	Calgary Roughnecks	Rexall Place	L 10–22		8,136	3–7
11	March 21, 2009	@ San Jose Stealth	HP Pavilion at San Jose	L 10–11		4,034	3–8
12	March 28, 2009	Toronto Rock	Rexall Place	W 16–12		7,356	4–8
13	April 3, 2009	Portland LumberJax	Rexall Place	W 11–10		6,517	5–8
14	April 4, 2009	@ Minnesota Swarm	Xcel Energy Center	L 7–9		12,476	5–9
15	April 11, 2009	Calgary Roughnecks	Rexall Place	L 13–14		8,500	5–10
16	April 17, 2009	@ Colorado Mammoth	Pepsi Center	L 9–10		16,727	5–11

== Player stats ==
=== Runners (Top 10) ===
Note: GP = Games played; G = Goals; A = Assists; Pts = Points; LB = Loose balls; PIM = Penalty minutes

Player	GP	G	A	Pts	LB	PIM
Dan Teat	16	28	41	69	55	4
Andy Secore	16	23	40	63	52	9
Mike Hominuck	13	15	32	47	47	6
Ryan Benesch	14	17	27	44	71	2
Callum Crawford	13	19	22	41	48	0
Jimmy Quinlan	15	16	15	31	60	31
Jason Wulder	7	7	12	19	34	2
Ian Hawksbee	16	3	11	14	150	16
Scott Self	16	5	8	13	90	14
Totals		250	409	301	1033	35

=== Goaltenders ===
Note: GP = Games played; MIN = Minutes; W = Wins; L = Losses; GA = Goals against; Sv% = Save percentage; GAA = Goals against average

Player	GP	MIN	W	L	GA	Sv%	GAA
Chris Levis	16	596:08	4	6	111	.777	11.17
Steve Dietrich	10	295:45	1	4	69	.742	14.00
Brandon Atherton	6	72:27	0	1	18	.714	14.91
Totals			5	11	200	.759	12.50

== Transactions ==
=== New players ===
- Cam Bergman - acquired in trade
- Andrew Biers - acquired in trade
- Steve Dietrich - acquired in trade
- Greg Hinman - acquired in trade
- Spencer Martin - acquired in trade
- Chris McKay - acquired in trade
- Tim O'Brien - signed as free agent
- Lindsay Plunkett - acquired in trade

=== Players not returning ===
- Mac Allen - traded
- Troy Bonterre - traded
- Kyle Goundrey - released
- Kris Hartzell - traded
- Matt King - traded
- Ben Prepchuk - not playing in 2009
- Dan Stroup - released
- Brendan Thenhaus - traded
- Kurtis Wagar - traded

=== Trades ===
June 30, 2008	To Edmonton Rush Lindsay Plunkett (F); Matt Brown (F)	To Rochester Knighthawks Troy Bonterre (D); Mac Allen (D); 3rd round pick in 2008 Entry Draft - Brendan Loftus (F)
July 1, 2008	To Edmonton Rush Chris McKay (F)	To Minnesota Swarm *2nd round pick in 2008 Entry Draft - Steven Brooks (F)
July 2, 2008	To Edmonton Rush Greg Hinman (D)	To Buffalo Bandits **3rd round pick in 2009 Entry Draft - Ben Hunt (T)
July 8, 2008	To Edmonton Rush Steve Dietrich (G); ***1st round pick in 2008 Entry Draft - Andrew Watt (T)	To Calgary Roughnecks Matt King (G); Kris Hartzell (D); 1st round pick in 2008 Entry Draft - Matt Danowski (F)
July 24, 2008	To Edmonton Rush Cam Bergman (T)	To Boston Blazers Brenden Thenhaus (F); Kurtis Wagar (G)
September 7, 2008	To Edmonton Rush Andrew Biers (F); 1st round pick in 2008 Entry Draft - Ryan Campbell (F)	To Minnesota Swarm 1st round pick in 2008 Entry Draft - Andrew Watt (T)
September 15, 2008	To Edmonton Rush Spencer Martin (F)	To Portland LumberJax Matt Brown (F)
October 2, 2008	To Edmonton Rush Ryan McNish (D); 3rd round pick in 2010 Entry Draft - Alex Kedoh Hill (F)	To Calgary Roughnecks ****1st round pick in 2010 Entry Draft - David Brock (T)
January 14, 2009	To Edmonton Rush Ryan Benesch (F); Derek Suddons (D)	To Toronto Rock 1st round pick in 2009 Entry Draft - Joel Dalgarno (F); ***2nd round pick in 2010 Entry Draft - Josh Gillam (F)
March 17, 2009	To Edmonton Rush 2nd round pick in 2009 Entry Draft - Dane Stevens (F)	To Toronto Rock Steve Dietrich (G)

*Later traded to the Chicago Shamrox
**Later traded to the Washington Stealth
***Later traded to the Minnesota Swarm
****Later traded to the Boston Blazers

=== Entry draft ===
The 2008 NLL Entry Draft took place on September 7, 2008. The Rush selected the following players:

^{#} Denotes player who never played in the NLL regular season or playoffs

Round	Overall	Player	College/Club
1	4	Jamie Floris (F)	Bellarmine University
1	10	Ryan Campbell (F)	Dowling College
3	27	Kelly Kilpatrick^{#} (F)	Coquitlam, BC
5	51	Myles Kenny^{#} (T)	Victoria, BC
6	64	Adam Foss^{#} (D)	New Westminster, BC

== Roster ==
2009 Edmonton Rush roster
Active (21-man) roster		Inactive roster	Coaches
Goaltenders: 00 (Canada) Brandon Atherton; 33 (Canada) Chris Levis; Defensemen: 55 (Canada) Shayne Bennett; 18 (Canada) Andrew Biers; 43 (Canada) Rory Glaves (A); 36 (Canada) Chris McKay; 11 (Canada) Ryan McNish; 6 (Canada) Scott Self; 7 (Canada) Derek Suddons; 29 (Canada) Buck Stobart	Forwards: 9 (Canada) Ryan Benesch; 14 (Canada) Ryan Campbell; 23 (Canada) Callum Crawford; 24 (Canada) Jamie Floris; 90 (Canada) Mike Hominuck; 81 (Canada) Jimmy Quinlan (A); 21 (Canada) Andy Secore; 51 (Canada) Dan Teat; 22 (Canada) Jason Wulder; Transition: 88 (Canada) Ian Hawksbee; 15 (Canada) Chris McElroy (C); 8 (Canada) Chris Seller	Practice squad: -- (Canada) Mike MacLeod; Injured reserve: 5 (Canada) Ian Crashley; Holdout: -- (United States) Dave Cutten; -- (Canada) Curt Morwick; 12 (Canada) Lindsay Plunkett; Restricted list: -- (Canada) Spencer Martin; 26 (Canada) Andrew Turner; 19 (Canada) Ben Prepchuk	Head coach {{{Head Coach}}} Legend: * Suspended list; (C) Captain; (A) Alternate captain; NLL Transactions

== See also ==
- 2009 NLL season
