= 2009 Boston Blazers season =

2009 Boston Blazers
- League: NLL
- Division: 3rd East
- 2009 record: 10-6
- Home record: 4-4
- Road record: 6-2
- Goals for: 181
- Goals against: 168
- General Manager: Tom Ryan
- Coach: Tom Ryan
- Arena: TD Banknorth Garden
- Average attendance: 6,621

Team leaders
- Goals: Daryl Veltman (34)
- Assists: Dan Dawson (74)
- Points: Dan Dawson (104)
- Penalties in minutes: Kyle Ross (53)
- Loose Balls: Jon Harnett (106)
- Wins: Anthony Cosmo (9)
- Goals against average: Anthony Cosmo (10.14)

The Boston Blazers are a lacrosse team based in Boston playing in the National Lacrosse League (NLL). The 2009 season was their first season in the NLL.

The Blazers began their inaugural season by losing back-to-back games to the division rival (and eventual East division champion) New York Titans. But the Blazers surprised everybody by winning seven of their next eight games, on their way to a 10-6 record, tied with New York and Buffalo for best in the East. The Titans won the East on tie-breakers, but the Blazers finished a respectable third and made the playoffs in their first season.

In the Eastern division semi-final, the Blazers were defeated by the defending champion Buffalo Bandits 11-8.

== Regular season ==
=== Conference standings ===
East Division
| P | Team | GP | W | L | PCT | GB | Home | Road | GF | GA | Diff | GF/GP | GA/GP |
|---|---|---|---|---|---|---|---|---|---|---|---|---|---|
| 1 | New York Titans – xy | 16 | 10 | 6 | .625 | 0.0 | 5–3 | 5–3 | 190 | 180 | +10 | 11.88 | 11.25 |
| 2 | Buffalo Bandits – x | 16 | 10 | 6 | .625 | 0.0 | 5–3 | 5–3 | 223 | 170 | +53 | 13.94 | 10.62 |
| 3 | Boston Blazers – x | 16 | 10 | 6 | .625 | 0.0 | 4–4 | 6–2 | 181 | 168 | +13 | 11.31 | 10.50 |
| 4 | Rochester Knighthawks – x | 16 | 7 | 9 | .438 | 3.0 | 6–2 | 1–7 | 169 | 197 | −28 | 10.56 | 12.31 |
| 5 | Philadelphia Wings | 16 | 7 | 9 | .438 | 3.0 | 4–4 | 3–5 | 188 | 193 | −5 | 11.75 | 12.06 |
| 6 | Toronto Rock | 16 | 6 | 10 | .375 | 4.0 | 3–5 | 3–5 | 194 | 218 | −24 | 12.12 | 13.62 |

West Division
| P | Team | GP | W | L | PCT | GB | Home | Road | GF | GA | Diff | GF/GP | GA/GP |
|---|---|---|---|---|---|---|---|---|---|---|---|---|---|
| 1 | Calgary Roughnecks – xyz | 16 | 12 | 4 | .750 | 0.0 | 5–3 | 7–1 | 206 | 167 | +39 | 12.88 | 10.44 |
| 2 | Portland LumberJax – x | 16 | 9 | 7 | .562 | 3.0 | 4–4 | 5–3 | 181 | 177 | +4 | 11.31 | 11.06 |
| 3 | San Jose Stealth – x | 16 | 7 | 9 | .438 | 5.0 | 5–3 | 2–6 | 200 | 185 | +15 | 12.50 | 11.56 |
| 4 | Colorado Mammoth – x | 16 | 7 | 9 | .438 | 5.0 | 4–4 | 3–5 | 172 | 184 | −12 | 10.75 | 11.50 |
| 5 | Minnesota Swarm | 16 | 6 | 10 | .375 | 6.0 | 2–6 | 4–4 | 174 | 198 | −24 | 10.88 | 12.38 |
| 6 | Edmonton Rush | 16 | 5 | 11 | .312 | 7.0 | 4–4 | 1–7 | 159 | 200 | −41 | 9.94 | 12.50 |

x: Clinched playoff berth; c: Clinched playoff berth by crossing over to another division; y: Clinched division; z: Clinched best regular season record; GP: Games Played
W: Wins; L: Losses; GB: Games back; PCT: Win percentage; Home: Record at Home; Road: Record on the Road; GF: Goals scored; GA: Goals allowed
Differential: Difference between goals scored and allowed; GF/GP: Average number of goals scored per game; GA/GP: Average number of goals allowed per game

=== Game log ===
| Game | Date | Opponent | Location | Score | OT | Attendance | Record |
|---|---|---|---|---|---|---|---|
| 1 | January 10, 2009 | @ New York Titans | Prudential Center | L 14–19 | | 3,208 | 0–1 |
| 2 | January 17, 2009 | New York Titans | TD Banknorth Garden | L 9–13 | | 9,313 | 0–2 |
| 3 | January 23, 2009 | @ Philadelphia Wings | Wachovia Center | W 13–11 | | 9,462 | 1–2 |
| 4 | January 24, 2009 | Philadelphia Wings | TD Banknorth Garden | W 11–7 | | 4,423 | 2–2 |
| 5 | January 31, 2009 | Portland LumberJax | TD Banknorth Garden | L 8–9 | OT | 5,029 | 2–3 |
| 6 | February 7, 2009 | New York Titans | TD Banknorth Garden | W 9–8 | | 5,713 | 3–3 |
| 7 | February 13, 2009 | @ Philadelphia Wings | Wachovia Center | W 8–4 | | 9,006 | 4–3 |
| 8 | February 20, 2009 | @ Minnesota Swarm | Xcel Energy Center | W 16–12 | | 12,106 | 5–3 |
| 9 | February 22, 2009 | @ Calgary Roughnecks | Pengrowth Saddledome | W 11–10 | | 10,045 | 6–3 |
| 10 | February 28, 2009 | San Jose Stealth | TD Banknorth Garden | W 16–10 | | 6,833 | 7–3 |
| 11 | March 14, 2009 | Toronto Rock | TD Banknorth Garden | L 8–9 | OT | 6,485 | 7–4 |
| 12 | March 28, 2009 | @ Rochester Knighthawks | Blue Cross Arena | L 10–11 | | 7,329 | 7–5 |
| 13 | April 3, 2009 | @ Toronto Rock | Air Canada Centre | W 14–13 | | 12,884 | 8–5 |
| 14 | April 4, 2009 | Buffalo Bandits | TD Banknorth Garden | L 11–15 | | 7,073 | 8–6 |
| 15 | April 11, 2009 | Rochester Knighthawks | TD Banknorth Garden | W 10–5 | | 8,097 | 9–6 |
| 16 | April 18, 2009 | @ Buffalo Bandits | HSBC Arena | W 13–12 | OT | 18,527 | 10–6 |

== Playoffs ==
=== Game log ===
| Game | Date | Opponent | Location | Score | OT | Attendance | Record |
|---|---|---|---|---|---|---|---|
| Division Semifinal | May 2, 2009 | @ Buffalo Bandits | HSBC Arena | L 8–11 | | 13,343 | 0–1 |

== Player stats ==
=== Runners (Top 10) ===
Note: GP = Games played; G = Goals; A = Assists; Pts = Points; LB = Loose balls; PIM = Penalty minutes

| Player | GP | G | A | Pts | LB | PIM |
|---|---|---|---|---|---|---|
| Dan Dawson | 16 | 30 | 74 | 104 | 54 | 8 |
| Daryl Veltman | 15 | 34 | 43 | 77 | 92 | 2 |
| Brenden Thenhaus | 16 | 27 | 26 | 53 | 67 | 6 |
| Matt Lyons | 16 | 21 | 31 | 52 | 62 | 2 |
| Gary Bining | 15 | 20 | 24 | 44 | 49 | 4 |
| Sean Morris | 6 | 8 | 16 | 24 | 17 | 0 |
| Jason Bloom | 16 | 13 | 10 | 23 | 60 | 5 |
| Greg Downing | 14 | 4 | 13 | 17 | 95 | 10 |
| Nick Cotter | 12 | 8 | 8 | 16 | 32 | 21 |
| Totals | | 301 | 482 | 285 | 1117 | 39 |

=== Goaltenders ===
Note: GP = Games played; MIN = Minutes; W = Wins; L = Losses; GA = Goals against; Sv% = Save percentage; GAA = Goals against average

| Player | GP | MIN | W | L | GA | Sv% | GAA |
|---|---|---|---|---|---|---|---|
| Anthony Cosmo | 16 | 840:02 | 9 | 5 | 142 | .781 | 10.14 |
| Mike Poulin | 16 | 122:12 | 1 | 1 | 25 | .734 | 12.27 |
| Totals | | | 10 | 6 | 168 | .774 | 10.50 |

== Transactions ==
=== Trades ===
| September 18, 2008 | To Boston Blazers Anthony Kelly | To New York Titans Kurtis Wagar |
| September 15, 2008 | To Boston Blazers Jason Bloom; 5th round pick, 2008 entry draft | To Colorado Mammoth John Gallant |
| August 28, 2008 | To Boston Blazers Paul Dawson | To San Jose Stealth Peter Veltman |
| July 29, 2008 | To Boston Blazers Jack Reid | To Rochester Knighthawks Kyle Laverty |
| July 29, 2008 | To Boston Blazers Travis Gillespie third round pick, 2009 entry draft | To Calgary Roughnecks Devan Wray |
| July 29, 2008 | To Boston Blazers Sean Morris; Steve Panarelli second round pick, 2010 entry draft | To San Jose Stealth Travis Gillespie; Tom Johnson third round pick, 2009 entry draft |
| July 24, 2008 | To Boston Blazers Brendan Thenhaus; Kurtis Wagar | To Edmonton Rush Cam Bergman |

=== Entry draft ===
The 2008 NLL Entry Draft took place on September 7, 2008. The Blazers selected the following players:

| Round | Overall | Player | College/Club |
|---|---|---|---|
| 1 | 1 | Daryl Veltman | Hobart College |
| 2 | 14 | Nick Cotter | Dowling College |
| 3 | 26 | Jon Harnett | Adrian College |
| 4 | 37 | Dilan Graham | Bellarmine University |
| 4 | 44 | Reed MacPhail | Victoria, BC |
| 5 | 52 | Chad Henry | Adelphi University |
| 5 | 56 | Paul Manesis | UMass |
| 6 | 63 | Danny Brennan | Syracuse University |

== Roster ==
2009 Boston Blazers roster
| Active (21-man) roster | | Inactive roster | Coaches |
|---|---|---|---|
| Goaltenders: 44 (Canada) Anthony Cosmo; 30 (Canada) Mike Poulin; Defensemen: 85 (United States) Mitch Belisle; 2 (Canada) Paul Dawson; 12 (Canada) Jon Durno; 28 (Canada) Dilan Graham; 33 (Canada) Jon Harnett; 4 (Canada) Carter Livingstone; 15 (Canada) Curtis Ptolemy; 18 (United States) Jack Reid | Forwards: 22 (Canada) Bryan Bendig; 9 (Canada) Gary Bining; 6 (Canada) Dan Dawson; 8 (United States) Greg Downing; 19 (Canada) Matt Lyons; 25 (United States) Sean Morris; 23 (United States) Brett Queener; 97 (Canada) Kyle Ross; 10 (Canada) Brenden Thenhaus; 75 (Canada) Jay Thorimbert; 16 (Canada) Daryl Veltman; Transition: 47 (Canada) Jason Bloom; 37 (Canada) Nick Cotter | Practice squad: -- Travis Brown; -- Paul Manesis; -- (Canada) Nick Rose | Head coach {{{Head Coach}}} Legend: * Suspended list; (C) Captain; (A) Alternate captain; NLL Transactions |

== See also ==
- 2009 NLL season
