= 2009 Rochester Knighthawks season =

NLL team season

2009 Rochester Knighthawks
- League: NLL
- Division: 4th East
- 2009 record: 7-9
- Home record: 6-2
- Road record: 1-7
- Goals for: 169
- Goals against: 197
- General Manager: Regy Thorpe
- Coach: Paul Gait
- Captain: Shawn Williams
- Arena: Blue Cross Arena
- Average attendance: 9,452

Team leaders
- Goals: Shawn Evans (30)
- Assists: Shawn Williams (67)
- Points: Shawn Williams (93)
- Penalties in minutes: Kyle Laverty (83)
- Loose Balls: Steve Toll (178)
- Wins: Pat O'Toole (7)
- Goals against average: Pat O'Toole (10.74)

The Rochester Knighthawks were a lacrosse team based in Rochester, New York, United States, that played in the National Lacrosse League (NLL). The 2009 season was the 15th in franchise history.

In September 2008, Knighthawks superstar John Grant, Jr. underwent emergency surgery on his left knee to remove an infection from his ACL. The surgery meant that Grant would miss the entire 2009 season. To make up for the loss of their most potent scoring threat, the Knighthawks pulled an unexpected move: they traded forward Andrew Potter and two first round draft picks to the Colorado Mammoth for the rights to lacrosse legend Gary Gait, and convinced Gait to return to playing after a three-year retirement.

== Regular season ==
=== Conference standings ===
East Division
P	Team	GP	W	L	PCT	GB	Home	Road	GF	GA	Diff	GF/GP	GA/GP
1	New York Titans – xy	16	10	6	.625	0.0	5–3	5–3	190	180	+10	11.88	11.25
2	Buffalo Bandits – x	16	10	6	.625	0.0	5–3	5–3	223	170	+53	13.94	10.62
3	Boston Blazers – x	16	10	6	.625	0.0	4–4	6–2	181	168	+13	11.31	10.50
4	Rochester Knighthawks – x	16	7	9	.438	3.0	6–2	1–7	169	197	−28	10.56	12.31
5	Philadelphia Wings	16	7	9	.438	3.0	4–4	3–5	188	193	−5	11.75	12.06
6	Toronto Rock	16	6	10	.375	4.0	3–5	3–5	194	218	−24	12.12	13.62

West Division
P	Team	GP	W	L	PCT	GB	Home	Road	GF	GA	Diff	GF/GP	GA/GP
1	Calgary Roughnecks – xyz	16	12	4	.750	0.0	5–3	7–1	206	167	+39	12.88	10.44
2	Portland LumberJax – x	16	9	7	.562	3.0	4–4	5–3	181	177	+4	11.31	11.06
3	San Jose Stealth – x	16	7	9	.438	5.0	5–3	2–6	200	185	+15	12.50	11.56
4	Colorado Mammoth – x	16	7	9	.438	5.0	4–4	3–5	172	184	−12	10.75	11.50
5	Minnesota Swarm	16	6	10	.375	6.0	2–6	4–4	174	198	−24	10.88	12.38
6	Edmonton Rush	16	5	11	.312	7.0	4–4	1–7	159	200	−41	9.94	12.50

x: Clinched playoff berth; c: Clinched playoff berth by crossing over to another division; y: Clinched division; z: Clinched best regular season record; GP: Games Played
W: Wins; L: Losses; GB: Games back; PCT: Win percentage; Home: Record at Home; Road: Record on the Road; GF: Goals scored; GA: Goals allowed
Differential: Difference between goals scored and allowed; GF/GP: Average number of goals scored per game; GA/GP: Average number of goals allowed per game

=== Game log ===
Game	Date	Opponent	Location	Score	OT	Attendance	Record
1	January 10, 2009	Philadelphia Wings	Blue Cross Arena	L 13–16		7,422	0–1
2	January 16, 2009	@ Buffalo Bandits	HSBC Arena	L 6–23		15,494	0–2
3	January 18, 2009	@ San Jose Stealth	HP Pavilion at San Jose	L 6–16		3,463	0–3
4	January 24, 2009	New York Titans	Blue Cross Arena	L 7–8		6,739	0–4
5	January 31, 2009	Toronto Rock	Blue Cross Arena	W 13–11		7,088	1–4
6	February 15, 2009	@ New York Titans	Madison Square Garden	L 9–15		5,187	1–5
7	February 21, 2009	New York Titans	Blue Cross Arena	W 15–7		7,142	2–5
8	February 28, 2009	Toronto Rock	Blue Cross Arena	W 18–10		6,739	3–5
9	March 14, 2009	Buffalo Bandits	Blue Cross Arena	W 15–14	OT	9,134	4–5
10	March 21, 2009	@ Toronto Rock	Air Canada Centre	L 10–16		14,812	4–6
11	March 28, 2009	Boston Blazers	Blue Cross Arena	W 11–10		7,329	5–6
12	April 3, 2009	@ Colorado Mammoth	Pepsi Center	W 12–8		16,834	6–6
13	April 4, 2009	@ Calgary Roughnecks	Pengrowth Saddledome	L 9–12		10,098	6–7
14	April 10, 2009	@ Buffalo Bandits	HSBC Arena	L 9–13		17,118	6–8
15	April 11, 2009	@ Boston Blazers	TD Banknorth Garden	L 5–10		8,097	6–9
16	April 18, 2009	Philadelphia Wings	Blue Cross Arena	W 11–8		8,539	7–9

== Playoffs ==
=== Game log ===
Game	Date	Opponent	Location	Score	OT	Attendance	Record
Division Semifinal	May 1, 2009	@ New York Titans	Prudential Center	L 10–11	OT	4,878	0–1

== Player stats ==
=== Runners (Top 10) ===
Note: GP = Games played; G = Goals; A = Assists; Pts = Points; LB = Loose balls; PIM = Penalty minutes

Player	GP	G	A	Pts	LB	PIM
Shawn Williams	16	26	67	93	85	4
Shawn Evans	16	30	49	79	106	42
Jason Henhawk	14	18	20	38	55	6
Gary Gait	11	22	15	37	42	4
Craig Point	10	17	11	28	47	12
Joe Walters	15	8	12	20	50	7
Chris Schiller	16	8	11	19	100	20
Steve Toll	16	4	13	17	178	6
Ken Millin	14	5	11	16	41	21
Totals		262	431	373	1117	42

=== Goaltenders ===
Note: GP = Games played; MIN = Minutes; W = Wins; L = Losses; GA = Goals against; Sv% = Save percentage; GAA = Goals against average

Player	GP	MIN	W	L	GA	Sv%	GAA
Pat O'Toole	13	776:46	7	6	139	.774	10.74
Derek Collins	3	93:20	0	3	28	.627	18.00
Phil Wetherup	2	49:48	0	0	21	.543	25.30
Ben Vanevery	13	43:52	0	0	7	.788	9.57
Jake Henhawk	1	0:00	0	0	0	.000	.00
Totals			7	9	197	.744	12.31

== Transactions ==
=== New players ===
- Aaron Wilson - acquired in trade
- Gary Gait - acquired in trade
- Chris Courtney - acquired in trade

=== Players not returning ===
- Stephen Hoar - traded
- Andrew Potter - traded
- Jack Reid - traded
- John Grant, Jr. - injured, out for season
- Luke Forget - traded

=== Trades ===
February 19, 2009	To Rochester Knighthawks Craig Point; Dean Hill	To Minnesota Swarm Aaron Wilson conditional draft pick
December 9, 2008	To Rochester Knighthawks second round selection, 2009 entry draft	To Portland LumberJax Luke Forget
November 19, 2008	To Rochester Knighthawks Chris Courtney	To Minnesota Swarm fourth round pick, 2010 entry draft
October 15, 2008	To Rochester Knighthawks Gary Gait	To Colorado Mammoth Andrew Potter; 1st round pick, 2009 entry draft 1st round pick, 2010 entry draft
September 7, 2008	To Rochester Knighthawks Aaron Wilson first round pick, 2009 entry draft (from Toronto)	To Toronto Rock Luke Wiles; Stephen Hoar	To San Jose Stealth first round pick, 2008 entry draft (from Rochester)
July 29, 2008	To Rochester Knighthawks Kyle Laverty	To Boston Blazers Jack Reid
June 30, 2008	To Rochester Knighthawks Troy Bonterre; Mac Allen third round pick, 2008 entry draft	To Edmonton Rush Lindsay Plunkett; Matt Brown

=== Entry draft ===
The 2008 NLL Entry Draft took place on September 7, 2008. The Knighthawks selected the following players:

Round	Overall	Player	College/Club
2	18	Joel McCready	Cornell University/St. Catharines Athletics Jr.A
3	29	Kyle Guadagnolo	Syracuse University
3	30	Brendan Loftus	Syracuse University
4	41	Jesse Guerin	Peterborough Lakers Jr.A
5	54	Logan Kane	Onondaga Community College/Six Nations Arrows Jr.A
6	67	Mitch Nanticoke	Six Nations Arrows Jr.A

== Roster ==
2009 Rochester Knighthawks roster
Active (21-man) roster		Inactive roster	Coaches
Goaltenders: 39 (Canada) Pat O'Toole; 52 (Haudenosaunee) Ben Van Every; Defensemen: 7 (Canada) Mac Allen; 12 (Canada) Troy Bonterre; 5 (Canada) Sandy Chapman; 42 (United States) Pat Cougevan; 20 (Canada) Bill Greer; -- (United States) Anthony Kelly; 71 (Canada) Kyle Laverty; 11 (United States) Regy Thorpe	Forwards: 15 (Canada) Shawn Evans; 22 (Canada) Gary Gait; 88 (Canada) Jason Henhawk; 73 (Haudenosaunee) Dean Hill; 14 (Canada) Mat MacLeod; -- (Canada) Bobby McBride; 32 (Canada) Ken Millin; 9 (Haudenosaunee) Craig Point; 1 (United States) Joe Walters; 51 (Canada) Shawn Williams; Transition: 21 (Haudenosaunee) Stuart Hill; 2 (United States) Chris Schiller; 36 (United States) Andrew Spack; 17 (Canada) Steve Toll	Practice squad: 18 (Canada) Jesse Guerin; -- (Canada) Jake Henhawk; -- (Canada) Darcy Powless; -- Pat Saunders; Injured reserve: 19 (Canada) Scott Evans; 24 (Canada) John Grant; 26 (Haudenosaunee) Chandon Hill; 6 (Haudenosaunee) Logan Kane; 9 (Canada) Joel McCready; 28 (Haudenosaunee) Mitch Nanticoke; Holdout: -- (United States) Kyle Guadagnolo; Protected list: 3 (Canada) Chris Courtney; 25 (United States) Scott Ditzell	Head coach {{{Head Coach}}} Legend: * Suspended list; (C) Captain; (A) Alternate captain; NLL Transactions

== See also ==
- 2009 NLL season
