= 2009 San Jose Stealth season =

2009 San Jose Stealth
- League: NLL
- Division: 3rd West
- 2009 record: 7-9
- Home record: 5-3
- Road record: 2-6
- Goals for: 200
- Goals against: 185
- General Manager: Johnny Mouradian
- Coach: Jeff Dowling; Chris Hall
- Captain: Colin Doyle
- Alternate captains: Jeff Zywicki
- Arena: HP Pavilion at San Jose
- Average attendance: 4,130

Team leaders
- Goals: Colin Doyle (38)
- Assists: Colin Doyle (73)
- Points: Colin Doyle (111)
- Penalties in minutes: Eric Martin (89)
- Loose Balls: Eric Martin (100)
- Wins: Matt Roik (4)
- Goals against average: Tyler Richards (10.08)

The San Jose Stealth are a lacrosse team based in San Jose, California. The team plays in the National Lacrosse League (NLL). The 2009 season will be the 10th in franchise history and 6th as the Stealth (previously the Albany Attack).

On March 19, offensive coordinator Chris Hall was named head coach, while former head coach Jeff Dowling took over Hall's post as offensive coordinator. Dowling resigned a week later.

== Regular season ==
=== Conference standings ===
East Division
| P | Team | GP | W | L | PCT | GB | Home | Road | GF | GA | Diff | GF/GP | GA/GP |
|---|---|---|---|---|---|---|---|---|---|---|---|---|---|
| 1 | New York Titans – xy | 16 | 10 | 6 | .625 | 0.0 | 5–3 | 5–3 | 190 | 180 | +10 | 11.88 | 11.25 |
| 2 | Buffalo Bandits – x | 16 | 10 | 6 | .625 | 0.0 | 5–3 | 5–3 | 223 | 170 | +53 | 13.94 | 10.62 |
| 3 | Boston Blazers – x | 16 | 10 | 6 | .625 | 0.0 | 4–4 | 6–2 | 181 | 168 | +13 | 11.31 | 10.50 |
| 4 | Rochester Knighthawks – x | 16 | 7 | 9 | .438 | 3.0 | 6–2 | 1–7 | 169 | 197 | −28 | 10.56 | 12.31 |
| 5 | Philadelphia Wings | 16 | 7 | 9 | .438 | 3.0 | 4–4 | 3–5 | 188 | 193 | −5 | 11.75 | 12.06 |
| 6 | Toronto Rock | 16 | 6 | 10 | .375 | 4.0 | 3–5 | 3–5 | 194 | 218 | −24 | 12.12 | 13.62 |

West Division
| P | Team | GP | W | L | PCT | GB | Home | Road | GF | GA | Diff | GF/GP | GA/GP |
|---|---|---|---|---|---|---|---|---|---|---|---|---|---|
| 1 | Calgary Roughnecks – xyz | 16 | 12 | 4 | .750 | 0.0 | 5–3 | 7–1 | 206 | 167 | +39 | 12.88 | 10.44 |
| 2 | Portland LumberJax – x | 16 | 9 | 7 | .562 | 3.0 | 4–4 | 5–3 | 181 | 177 | +4 | 11.31 | 11.06 |
| 3 | San Jose Stealth – x | 16 | 7 | 9 | .438 | 5.0 | 5–3 | 2–6 | 200 | 185 | +15 | 12.50 | 11.56 |
| 4 | Colorado Mammoth – x | 16 | 7 | 9 | .438 | 5.0 | 4–4 | 3–5 | 172 | 184 | −12 | 10.75 | 11.50 |
| 5 | Minnesota Swarm | 16 | 6 | 10 | .375 | 6.0 | 2–6 | 4–4 | 174 | 198 | −24 | 10.88 | 12.38 |
| 6 | Edmonton Rush | 16 | 5 | 11 | .312 | 7.0 | 4–4 | 1–7 | 159 | 200 | −41 | 9.94 | 12.50 |

x: Clinched playoff berth; c: Clinched playoff berth by crossing over to another division; y: Clinched division; z: Clinched best regular season record; GP: Games Played
W: Wins; L: Losses; GB: Games back; PCT: Win percentage; Home: Record at Home; Road: Record on the Road; GF: Goals scored; GA: Goals allowed
Differential: Difference between goals scored and allowed; GF/GP: Average number of goals scored per game; GA/GP: Average number of goals allowed per game

=== Game log ===
| Game | Date | Opponent | Location | Score | OT | Attendance | Record |
|---|---|---|---|---|---|---|---|
| 1 | January 9, 2009 | Calgary Roughnecks | HP Pavilion at San Jose | L 10–12 | | 4,538 | 0–1 |
| 2 | January 10, 2009 | @ Minnesota Swarm | Xcel Energy Center | L 7–10 | | 13,094 | 0–2 |
| 3 | January 18, 2009 | Rochester Knighthawks | HP Pavilion at San Jose | W 16–6 | | 3,463 | 1–2 |
| 4 | January 24, 2009 | @ Calgary Roughnecks | Pengrowth Saddledome | L 13–16 | | 9,828 | 1–3 |
| 5 | January 31, 2009 | Edmonton Rush | HP Pavilion at San Jose | W 16–6 | | 3,256 | 2–3 |
| 6 | February 7, 2009 | @ Portland LumberJax | Rose Garden | L 13–16 | | 6,943 | 2–4 |
| 7 | February 21, 2009 | Colorado Mammoth | HP Pavilion at San Jose | W 14–9 | | 5,576 | 3–4 |
| 8 | February 28, 2009 | @ Boston Blazers | TD Banknorth Garden | L 10–16 | | 6,833 | 3–5 |
| 9 | March 1, 2009 | @ New York Titans | Prudential Center | L 14–15 | | 3,287 | 3–6 |
| 10 | March 14, 2009 | Colorado Mammoth | HP Pavilion at San Jose | L 11–14 | | 3,535 | 3–7 |
| 11 | March 21, 2009 | Edmonton Rush | HP Pavilion at San Jose | W 11–10 | | 4,034 | 4–7 |
| 12 | March 28, 2009 | Portland LumberJax | HP Pavilion at San Jose | L 12–14 | | 3,018 | 4–8 |
| 13 | March 29, 2009 | @ Portland LumberJax | Rose Garden | W 13–8 | | 6,473 | 5–8 |
| 14 | April 3, 2009 | Minnesota Swarm | HP Pavilion at San Jose | W 18–8 | | 5,618 | 6–8 |
| 15 | April 11, 2009 | @ Colorado Mammoth | Pepsi Center | W 11–10 | OT | 16,189 | 7–8 |
| 16 | April 18, 2009 | @ Toronto Rock | Air Canada Centre | L 11–15 | | 15,252 | 7–9 |

== Playoffs ==
=== Game log ===
| Game | Date | Opponent | Location | Score | OT | Attendance | Record |
|---|---|---|---|---|---|---|---|
| Division Semifinal | May 1, 2009 | @ Portland LumberJax | Rose Garden | W 20–16 | | 6,053 | 1–0 |
| Division Final | May 9, 2009 | @ Calgary Roughnecks | Pengrowth Saddledome | L 5–17 | | 9,639 | 1–1 |

== Player stats ==
=== Runners (Top 10) ===
Note: GP = Games played; G = Goals; A = Assists; Pts = Points; LB = Loose balls; PIM = Penalty minutes

| Player | GP | G | A | Pts | LB | PIM |
|---|---|---|---|---|---|---|
| Colin Doyle | 16 | 38 | 73 | 111 | 63 | 12 |
| Rhys Duch | 16 | 35 | 54 | 89 | 97 | 4 |
| Jeff Zywicki | 16 | 32 | 46 | 78 | 83 | 33 |
| Cam Sedgwick | 15 | 23 | 40 | 63 | 67 | 6 |
| Paul Rabil | 16 | 16 | 18 | 34 | 60 | 6 |
| Tom Johnson | 14 | 20 | 13 | 33 | 64 | 4 |
| Eric Martin | 12 | 6 | 12 | 18 | 100 | 89 |
| Alex Turner | 7 | 7 | 9 | 16 | 21 | 4 |
| Frank Resetarits | 8 | 7 | 9 | 16 | 21 | 6 |
| Totals | | 340 | 540 | 383 | 1084 | 55 |

=== Goaltenders ===
Note: GP = Games played; MIN = Minutes; W = Wins; L = Losses; GA = Goals against; Sv% = Save percentage; GAA = Goals against average

| Player | GP | MIN | W | L | GA | Sv% | GAA |
|---|---|---|---|---|---|---|---|
| Matt Roik | 15 | 585:46 | 4 | 7 | 111 | .763 | 11.37 |
| Tyler Richards | 10 | 279:39 | 3 | 1 | 47 | .803 | 10.08 |
| Aaron Bold | 7 | 102:16 | 0 | 1 | 27 | .700 | 15.84 |
| Totals | | | 7 | 9 | 185 | .768 | 11.56 |

== Transactions ==
=== New players ===
- Matt Roik - acquired in trade
- Peter Veltman - acquired in trade
- Travis Gillespie - acquired in trade
- Tom Johnson - acquired in trade

=== Players not returning ===
- Luke Wiles - traded
- Anthony Cosmo - traded
- Gary Rosyski - free agent
- Paul Dawson - traded
- Sean Morris - traded
- Steve Panarelli - traded
- Andrew Guindon - released

=== Trades ===
| September 7, 2008 | To San Jose Stealth first round pick, 2008 entry draft (from Rochester) | To Toronto Rock Luke Wiles; Stephen Hoar | To Rochester Knighthawks Aaron Wilson first round pick, 2009 entry draft (from Toronto) |
| August 29, 2008 | To San Jose Stealth Matt Roik first round pick, 2008 entry draft first round pick, 2009 entry draft | To Chicago Shamrox Anthony Cosmo |
| August 28, 2008 | To San Jose Stealth Peter Veltman | To Boston Blazers Paul Dawson |
| July 29, 2008 | To Boston Blazers Sean Morris; Steve Panarelli second round pick, 2010 entry draft | To San Jose Stealth Travis Gillespie; Tom Johnson third round pick, 2009 entry draft |

=== Entry draft ===
The 2008 NLL Entry Draft took place on September 7, 2008. The Stealth selected the following players:

| Round | Overall | Player | College/Club |
|---|---|---|---|
| 1 | 2 | Paul Rabil | Johns Hopkins University |
| 1 | 3 | Rhys Duch | University of Stony Brook |
| 1 | 5 | Kevin Huntley | Johns Hopkins University |
| 3 | 32 | Alex Turner | Simon Fraser University |
| 5 | 57 | Trevor Wagar | University of Vermont |
| 6 | 70 | Nick O'Hara | Duke University |

== Roster ==
2009 San Jose Stealth roster
| Active (21-man) roster | | Inactive roster | Coaches |
|---|---|---|---|
| Goaltenders: 77 (Canada) Aaron Bold; 00 (Canada) Tyler Richards; 37 (Canada) Matt Roik; Defensemen: 44 (Canada) Travis Gillespie; 23 (Canada) Mike Grimes; 6 (Canada) Curtis Hodgson; 26 (United States) Mike Kirk; 25 (United States) Eric Martin; 11 (Canada) Kyle Sorensen | Forwards: 7 (Canada) Colin Doyle (C); 10 (Canada) Rhys Duch; 8 (Canada) Tom Johnson; 5 (United States) Frank Resetarits; 29 (Canada) Cam Sedgwick; 22 (Canada) Alex Turner; 9 (Canada) Jeff Zywicki (A); Transition: 31 (United States) Will Dalton; 18 (United States) Kyle Hartzell; 2 (United States) Brett Manney; 3 (Canada) Ryan Marshall; 17 (Canada) Steve McKinlay; 81 (United States) Paul Rabil; 13 (Canada) Peter Veltman | Practice Squad: 14 (United States) Michael Doneger; 33 (United States) Jonathan Munk; Injured Reserve: 12 (United States) Nick O'Hara | Head Coach {{{Head Coach}}} Legend: * Suspended list; (C) Captain; (A) Alternate captain; NLL Transactions |

== See also ==
- 2009 NLL season
