= 2009 Calgary Roughnecks season =

2009 Calgary Roughnecks
- Champion's Cup Champions
- West Division Champions
- League: NLL
- Division: 1st West
- 2009 record: 12-4
- Home record: 5-3
- Road record: 7-1
- Goals for: 206
- Goals against: 167
- General Manager: Brad Banister (interim)
- Coach: Troy Cordingley
- Captain: Tracey Kelusky
- Alternate captains: Kaleb Toth
- Arena: Pengrowth Saddledome
- Average attendance: 10,040

Team leaders
- Goals: Dane Dobbie (41)
- Assists: Josh Sanderson (74)
- Points: Josh Sanderson (103)
- Penalties in minutes: Scott Carnegie (46)
- Loose Balls: Jeff Shattler (119)
- Wins: Matt King (7)
- Goals against average: Matt King (10.23)

The Calgary Roughnecks are a lacrosse team based in Calgary playing in the National Lacrosse League (NLL). The 2009 season was the 8th in franchise history. The Roughnecks finished the season with a franchise best 12–4 record to lead the league. They won the Champion's Cup at home with a 12–10 victory over the New York Titans.

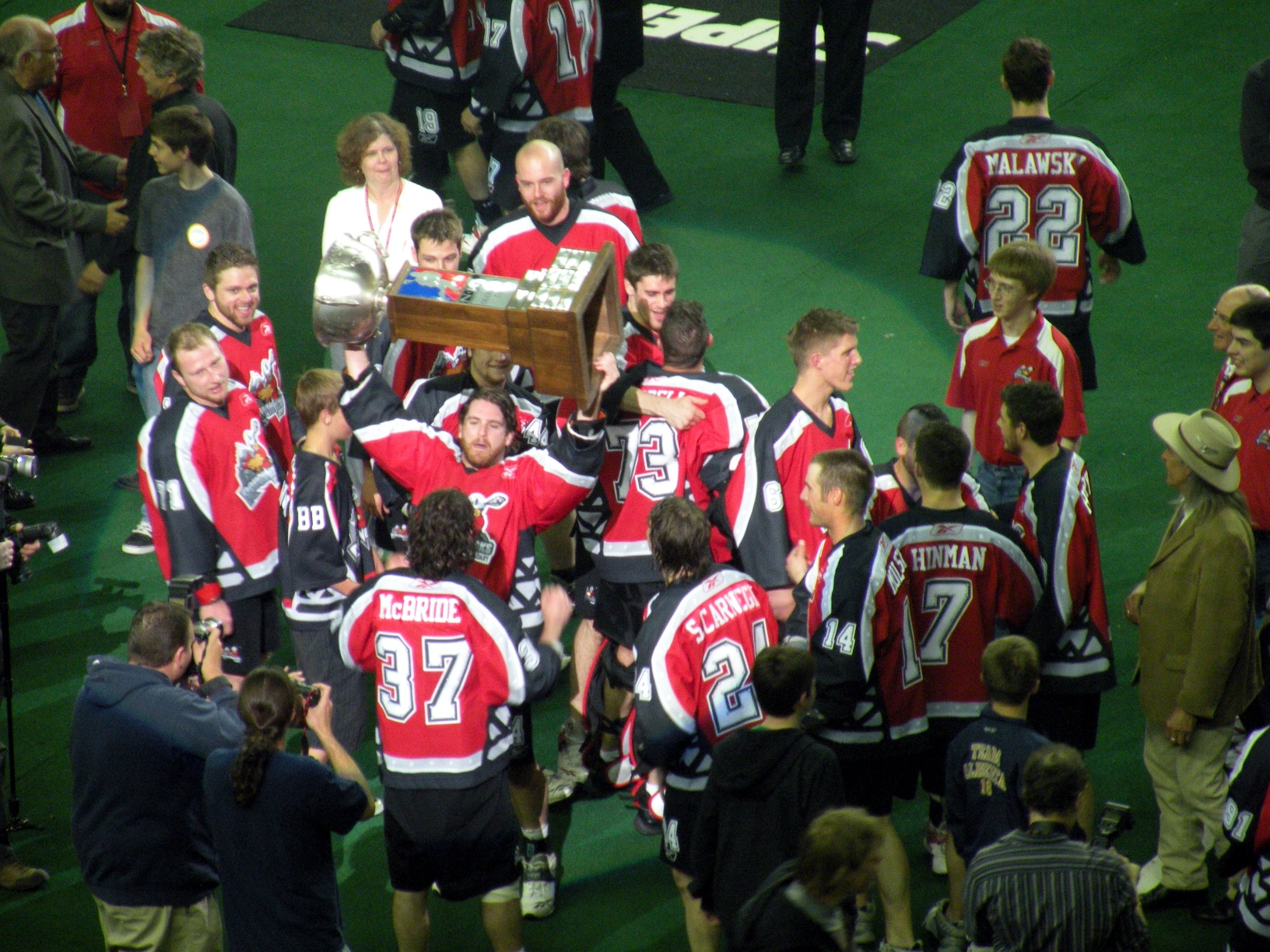
Devan Wray hoists the Champion's Cup

== Regular season ==
=== Conference standings ===
East Division
P	Team	GP	W	L	PCT	GB	Home	Road	GF	GA	Diff	GF/GP	GA/GP
1	New York Titans – xy	16	10	6	.625	0.0	5–3	5–3	190	180	+10	11.88	11.25
2	Buffalo Bandits – x	16	10	6	.625	0.0	5–3	5–3	223	170	+53	13.94	10.62
3	Boston Blazers – x	16	10	6	.625	0.0	4–4	6–2	181	168	+13	11.31	10.50
4	Rochester Knighthawks – x	16	7	9	.438	3.0	6–2	1–7	169	197	−28	10.56	12.31
5	Philadelphia Wings	16	7	9	.438	3.0	4–4	3–5	188	193	−5	11.75	12.06
6	Toronto Rock	16	6	10	.375	4.0	3–5	3–5	194	218	−24	12.12	13.62

West Division
P	Team	GP	W	L	PCT	GB	Home	Road	GF	GA	Diff	GF/GP	GA/GP
1	Calgary Roughnecks – xyz	16	12	4	.750	0.0	5–3	7–1	206	167	+39	12.88	10.44
2	Portland LumberJax – x	16	9	7	.562	3.0	4–4	5–3	181	177	+4	11.31	11.06
3	San Jose Stealth – x	16	7	9	.438	5.0	5–3	2–6	200	185	+15	12.50	11.56
4	Colorado Mammoth – x	16	7	9	.438	5.0	4–4	3–5	172	184	−12	10.75	11.50
5	Minnesota Swarm	16	6	10	.375	6.0	2–6	4–4	174	198	−24	10.88	12.38
6	Edmonton Rush	16	5	11	.312	7.0	4–4	1–7	159	200	−41	9.94	12.50

x: Clinched playoff berth; c: Clinched playoff berth by crossing over to another division; y: Clinched division; z: Clinched best regular season record; GP: Games Played
W: Wins; L: Losses; GB: Games back; PCT: Win percentage; Home: Record at Home; Road: Record on the Road; GF: Goals scored; GA: Goals allowed
Differential: Difference between goals scored and allowed; GF/GP: Average number of goals scored per game; GA/GP: Average number of goals allowed per game

=== Game log ===
Game	Date	Opponent	Location	Score	OT	Attendance	Record
1	January 9, 2009	@ San Jose Stealth	HP Pavilion at San Jose	W 12–10		4,538	1–0
2	January 10, 2009	Edmonton Rush	Pengrowth Saddledome	W 10–9	OT	11,197	2–0
3	January 17, 2009	@ Toronto Rock	Air Canada Centre	W 16–9		12,865	3–0
4	January 24, 2009	San Jose Stealth	Pengrowth Saddledome	W 16–13		9,828	4–0
5	February 6, 2009	Minnesota Swarm	Pengrowth Saddledome	W 13–8		10,090	5–0
6	February 14, 2009	@ Colorado Mammoth	Pepsi Center	L 12–13		17,712	5–1
7	February 22, 2009	Boston Blazers	Pengrowth Saddledome	L 10–11		10,045	5–2
8	February 28, 2009	@ New York Titans	Madison Square Garden	W 12–10		5,487	6–2
9	March 13, 2009	@ Edmonton Rush	Rexall Place	W 22–10		8,136	7–2
10	March 21, 2009	Colorado Mammoth	Pengrowth Saddledome	W 13–10		10,958	8–2
11	March 27, 2009	Toronto Rock	Pengrowth Saddledome	L 10–12		10,586	8–3
12	March 28, 2009	@ Minnesota Swarm	Xcel Energy Center	W 13–10		12,364	9–3
13	April 4, 2009	Rochester Knighthawks	Pengrowth Saddledome	W 12–9		10,098	10–3
14	April 10, 2009	Portland LumberJax	Pengrowth Saddledome	L 9–11		10,387	10–4
15	April 11, 2009	@ Edmonton Rush	Rexall Place	W 14–13		8,500	11–4
16	April 17, 2009	@ Portland LumberJax	Rose Garden	W 12–9		7,855	12–4

== Playoffs ==
=== Game log ===
Game	Date	Opponent	Location	Score	OT	Attendance	Record
Division Semifinal	May 3, 2009	Colorado Mammoth	Pengrowth Saddledome	W 15–8		9,760	1–0
Division Final	May 9, 2009	San Jose Stealth	Pengrowth Saddledome	W 17–4		9,639	2–0
Championship Game	May 15, 2009	New York Titans	Pengrowth Saddledome	W 12–10		13,042	3–0

== Player stats ==
=== Runners (Top 10) ===
Note: GP = Games played; G = Goals; A = Assists; Pts = Points; LB = Loose balls; PIM = Penalty minutes

Player	GP	G	A	Pts	LB	PIM
Josh Sanderson	16	29	74	103	73	4
Tracey Kelusky	16	31	53	84	84	4
Kaleb Toth	16	33	47	80	70	13
Dane Dobbie	16	41	35	76	83	16
Scott Ranger	15	19	32	51	46	4
Curt Malawsky	16	24	20	44	47	11
Jeff Shattler	16	13	15	28	119	15
Andrew McBride	16	1	10	11	63	27
Jeff Moleski	15	5	5	10	95	19
Totals		326	532	261	1108	68

=== Goaltenders ===
Note: GP = Games played; MIN = Minutes; W = Wins; L = Losses; GA = Goals against; Sv% = Save percentage; GAA = Goals against average

Player	GP	MIN	W	L	GA	Sv%	GAA
Matt King	16	422:06	7	0	72	.773	10.23
Pat Campbell	16	542:35	5	4	95	.764	10.51
Totals			12	4	167	.768	10.44

== Transactions ==
=== New players ===
- Matt King - acquired in trade
- Kris Hartzell - acquired in trade
- Kyle Goundrey - signed as free agent

=== Players not returning ===
- Ryan McNish - traded
- Travis Gillespie - traded
- Steve Dietrich - traded
- Ryan Avery - Released

=== Trades ===
October 2, 2008	To Calgary Roughnecks First round pick, 2010 entry draft	To Edmonton Rush Ryan McNish; Third round pick, 2010 entry draft
July 29, 2008	To Calgary Roughnecks Devan Wray	To Boston Blazers Travis Gillespie third round pick, 2009 entry draft
July 8, 2008	To Calgary Roughnecks Matt King; Kris Hartzell first round pick, 2008 entry draft	To Edmonton Rush Steve Dietrich first round pick, 2008 entry draft

=== Entry draft ===
The 2008 NLL Entry Draft took place on September 7, 2008. The Roughnecks selected the following players:

Round	Overall	Player	College/Club
1	6	Curtis Manning	Simon Fraser University
2	15	Cayle Ratcliff	UMBC
2	20	Joe Vetere	Burnaby, BC
4	42	Joel Henry	Victoria, BC
5	50	Bryan Johnson	Bellarmine University
5	55	Eric Lamothe	Canisius College
6	68	Tyler Pridham	Calgary, AB

== Roster ==
2009 Calgary Roughnecks roster
Active (21-man) roster		Inactive roster	Coaches
Goaltenders: 73 (Canada) Pat Campbell; 30 (Canada) Matt King; Defensemen: 16 (Canada) Mike Carnegie; 24 (Canada) Scott Carnegie; 20 (Canada) Bruce Codd; 27 (Canada) Kyle Couling; 7 (Canada) Greg Hinman; 55 (Canada) Mike Kilby; 6 (Canada) John Lintz; 37 (Canada) Andrew McBride; 80 (Canada) Peter McFetridge; 14 (Canada) Jeff Moleski	Forwards: 44 (Canada) Dane Dobbie; 91 (Canada) Kyle Goundrey; 17 (Canada) Tracey Kelusky (C); 22 (Canada) Curt Malawsky; 71 (Canada) Scott Ranger; 10 (England) Cayle Ratcliff; 19 (Canada) Josh Sanderson; 77 (Canada) Jeff Shattler; 9 (Canada) Kaleb Toth (A); Transition: 40 (Canada) Nolan Heavenor; 4 (Canada) Devan Wray	Practice squad: 51 (Canada) Alex Coutts; 08 (Canada) Joel Henry; 21 (Canada) Joe Vetere; Restricted list: 85 (Canada) Shawn Cable	Head coach {{{Head Coach}}} Legend: * Suspended list; (C) Captain; (A) Alternate captain; NLL Transactions

== See also ==
- 2009 NLL season
