= 2009 New York Titans season =

2009 New York Titans
- East Division Champions
- League: NLL
- Division: 1st East
- 2009 record: 10-6
- Home record: 5-3
- Road record: 5-3
- Goals for: 190
- Goals against: 180
- General Manager: Timothy Kelly
- Coach: Ed Comeau
- Captain: Casey Powell
- Arena: Madison Square Garden; Prudential Center; BankAtlantic Center
- Average attendance: 7,752

Team leaders
- Goals: Casey Powell (40)
- Assists: Jordan Hall (56)
- Points: Casey Powell (85)
- Penalties in minutes: Rory Smith (54)
- Loose Balls: Stephen Peyser (137)
- Wins: Matt Vinc (9)
- Goals against average: Matt Vinc (11.33)

The New York Titans are a lacrosse team based in New York City playing in the National Lacrosse League (NLL). The 2009 season was the 3rd in franchise history.

== Regular season ==
=== Conference standings ===
East Division
P	Team	GP	W	L	PCT	GB	Home	Road	GF	GA	Diff	GF/GP	GA/GP
1	New York Titans – xy	16	10	6	.625	0.0	5–3	5–3	190	180	+10	11.88	11.25
2	Buffalo Bandits – x	16	10	6	.625	0.0	5–3	5–3	223	170	+53	13.94	10.62
3	Boston Blazers – x	16	10	6	.625	0.0	4–4	6–2	181	168	+13	11.31	10.50
4	Rochester Knighthawks – x	16	7	9	.438	3.0	6–2	1–7	169	197	−28	10.56	12.31
5	Philadelphia Wings	16	7	9	.438	3.0	4–4	3–5	188	193	−5	11.75	12.06
6	Toronto Rock	16	6	10	.375	4.0	3–5	3–5	194	218	−24	12.12	13.62

West Division
P	Team	GP	W	L	PCT	GB	Home	Road	GF	GA	Diff	GF/GP	GA/GP
1	Calgary Roughnecks – xyz	16	12	4	.750	0.0	5–3	7–1	206	167	+39	12.88	10.44
2	Portland LumberJax – x	16	9	7	.562	3.0	4–4	5–3	181	177	+4	11.31	11.06
3	San Jose Stealth – x	16	7	9	.438	5.0	5–3	2–6	200	185	+15	12.50	11.56
4	Colorado Mammoth – x	16	7	9	.438	5.0	4–4	3–5	172	184	−12	10.75	11.50
5	Minnesota Swarm	16	6	10	.375	6.0	2–6	4–4	174	198	−24	10.88	12.38
6	Edmonton Rush	16	5	11	.312	7.0	4–4	1–7	159	200	−41	9.94	12.50

x: Clinched playoff berth; c: Clinched playoff berth by crossing over to another division; y: Clinched division; z: Clinched best regular season record; GP: Games Played
W: Wins; L: Losses; GB: Games back; PCT: Win percentage; Home: Record at Home; Road: Record on the Road; GF: Goals scored; GA: Goals allowed
Differential: Difference between goals scored and allowed; GF/GP: Average number of goals scored per game; GA/GP: Average number of goals allowed per game

=== Game log ===
Game	Date	Opponent	Location	Score	OT	Attendance	Record
1	January 3, 2009	Toronto Rock	Prudential Center	L 14–15		5,733	0–1
2	January 10, 2009	Boston Blazers	Prudential Center	W 19–14		3,208	1–1
3	January 17, 2009	@ Boston Blazers	TD Banknorth Garden	W 13–9		9,313	2–1
4	January 24, 2009	@ Rochester Knighthawks	Blue Cross Arena	W 8–7		6,739	3–1
5	January 31, 2009	@ Colorado Mammoth	Pepsi Center	L 8–12		15,023	3–2
6	February 7, 2009	@ Boston Blazers	TD Banknorth Garden	L 8–9		5,713	3–3
7	February 8, 2009	Philadelphia Wings	Prudential Center	W 15–12		4,231	4–3
8	February 15, 2009	Rochester Knighthawks	Prudential Center	W 15–9		5,187	5–3
9	February 21, 2009	@ Rochester Knighthawks	Blue Cross Arena	L 7–15		7,142	5–4
10	February 28, 2009	Calgary Roughnecks	Prudential Center	L 10–12		5,487	5–5
11	March 1, 2009	San Jose Stealth	Prudential Center	W 15–14		3,287	6–5
12	March 28, 2009	@ Buffalo Bandits	HSBC Arena	W 11–9		18,550	7–5
13	April 4, 2009	Philadelphia Wings	Prudential Center	L 7–11		4,187	7–6
14	April 5, 2009	@ Philadelphia Wings	Wachovia Center	W 16–13		10,806	8–6
15	April 11, 2009	Buffalo Bandits	Prudential Center	W 12–9		6,222	9–6
16	April 18, 2009	@ Minnesota Swarm	Xcel Energy Center	W 12–10		13,219	10–6

== Playoffs ==
=== Game log ===
Game	Date	Opponent	Location	Score	OT	Attendance	Record
Division Semifinal	May 1, 2009	Rochester Knighthawks	Prudential Center	W 11–10	OT	4,878	1–0
Division Final	May 9, 2009	Buffalo Bandits	Prudential Center	W 9–3		5,633	2–0
Championship Game	May 15, 2009	@ Calgary Roughnecks	Pengrowth Saddledome	L 10–12		13,042	2–1

== Player stats ==
=== Runners (Top 10) ===
Note: GP = Games played; G = Goals; A = Assists; Pts = Points; LB = Loose balls; PIM = Penalty minutes

Player	GP	G	A	Pts	LB	PIM
Casey Powell	13	40	45	85	59	16
Jordan Hall	16	25	56	81	97	12
Pat Maddalena	16	28	47	75	78	2
Brendan Mundorf	16	28	31	59	36	2
Ryan Boyle	16	14	40	54	70	4
Mike McLellan	16	29	24	53	39	4
Stephen Peyser	15	1	16	17	137	31
Jamie Rooney	10	7	7	14	30	4
Greg Peyser	9	5	7	12	74	35
Totals		317	507	322	1023	46

=== Goaltenders ===
Note: GP = Games played; MIN = Minutes; W = Wins; L = Losses; GA = Goals against; Sv% = Save percentage; GAA = Goals against average

Player	GP	MIN	W	L	GA	Sv%	GAA
Matt Vinc	16	916:11	9	6	173	.779	11.33
Erik Miller	7	38:24	1	0	4	.875	6.25
Kurtis Wagar	4	5:23	0	0	1	.750	11.15
Totals			10	6	180	.780	11.25

== Transactions ==
=== New players ===
- Dave Stilley - acquired in trade
- Kurtis Wagar - acquired in trade

=== Players not returning ===
- Anthony Kelly - traded
- Jamison Koesterer - traded

=== Trades ===
November 19, 2008	To New York Titans conditional pick, 2009 or 2010 entry draft	To Portland LumberJax Jamison Koesterer
November 17, 2008	To New York Titans Dave Stilley	To Colorado Mammoth conditional pick, 2009 entry draft
September 18, 2008	To New York Titans Kurtis Wagar	To Boston Blazers Anthony Kelly

=== Entry draft ===
The 2008 NLL Entry Draft took place on September 7, 2008. The Titans selected the following players:

Round	Overall	Player	College/Club
2	23	Stephen Peyser	Johns Hopkins University
3	33	Steve Ammann	University at Albany
4	46	Ben Rubeor	University of Virginia
5	59	Mike Ammann	University at Albany
6	72	Dan Cocoziello	Princeton University

== Roster ==
2009 New York Titans roster
Active (21-man) roster		Inactive roster	Coaches
Starting goaltender: 48 (Canada) Matt Vinc; Backup goaltenders: 21 (United States) Erik Miller; 1 (Canada) Kurtis Wagar; Defensemen: 3 (United States) Matt Alrich; 41 (United States) Bryan Barrett; 6 (United States) Jeff Bigas; 16 (Canada) Patrick Merrill; 24 (Canada) Rory Smith; 77 (United States) Dave Stilley	Forwards: 14 (United States) Ryan Boyle; 42 (Canada) Pat Maddalena; 19 (Canada) Mike McLellan; 2 (Australia) Brendan Mundorf; 22 (United States) Casey Powell (C); 90 (United States) Jamie Rooney; Transition: 7 (United States) Marc Burton; 71 (United States) Keevin Galbraith; 44 (Canada) Jordan Hall; 34 (United States) Ryan Maciaszek; 12 (United States) Jarett Park; 20 (United States) Greg Peyser; 18 (United States) Stephen Peyser; 10 (United States) Matt Zash	Injured reserve: 56 (United States) John Orsen	Head coach {{{Head Coach}}} Legend: * Suspended list; (C) Captain; (A) Alternate captain; NLL Transactions

== See also ==
- 2009 NLL season
