= 2009 Colorado Mammoth season =

2009 Colorado Mammoth
- League: NLL
- Division: 4th West
- 2009 record: 7-9
- Home record: 4-4
- Road record: 3-5
- Goals for: 172
- Goals against: 184
- General Manager: Steve Govett
- Coach: Bob McMahon
- Captain: Gavin Prout
- Arena: Pepsi Center
- Average attendance: 16,475

Team leaders
- Goals: Brian Langtry (38)
- Assists: Gavin Prout (48)
- Points: Brian Langtry (79)
- Penalties in minutes: Rich Catton (48)
- Loose Balls: Bryan Safarik (98)
- Wins: Andrew Leyshon (5)
- Goals against average: Andrew Leyshon (10.93)

The Colorado Mammoth are a lacrosse team based in Denver, Colorado playing in the National Lacrosse League (NLL). The 2009 season was the 23rd in franchise history and 7th as the Mammoth (previously the Washington Power, Pittsburgh Crossefire, and Baltimore Thunder).

== Regular season ==
=== Conference standings ===
East Division
P	Team	GP	W	L	PCT	GB	Home	Road	GF	GA	Diff	GF/GP	GA/GP
1	New York Titans – xy	16	10	6	.625	0.0	5–3	5–3	190	180	+10	11.88	11.25
2	Buffalo Bandits – x	16	10	6	.625	0.0	5–3	5–3	223	170	+53	13.94	10.62
3	Boston Blazers – x	16	10	6	.625	0.0	4–4	6–2	181	168	+13	11.31	10.50
4	Rochester Knighthawks – x	16	7	9	.438	3.0	6–2	1–7	169	197	−28	10.56	12.31
5	Philadelphia Wings	16	7	9	.438	3.0	4–4	3–5	188	193	−5	11.75	12.06
6	Toronto Rock	16	6	10	.375	4.0	3–5	3–5	194	218	−24	12.12	13.62

West Division
P	Team	GP	W	L	PCT	GB	Home	Road	GF	GA	Diff	GF/GP	GA/GP
1	Calgary Roughnecks – xyz	16	12	4	.750	0.0	5–3	7–1	206	167	+39	12.88	10.44
2	Portland LumberJax – x	16	9	7	.562	3.0	4–4	5–3	181	177	+4	11.31	11.06
3	San Jose Stealth – x	16	7	9	.438	5.0	5–3	2–6	200	185	+15	12.50	11.56
4	Colorado Mammoth – x	16	7	9	.438	5.0	4–4	3–5	172	184	−12	10.75	11.50
5	Minnesota Swarm	16	6	10	.375	6.0	2–6	4–4	174	198	−24	10.88	12.38
6	Edmonton Rush	16	5	11	.312	7.0	4–4	1–7	159	200	−41	9.94	12.50

x: Clinched playoff berth; c: Clinched playoff berth by crossing over to another division; y: Clinched division; z: Clinched best regular season record; GP: Games Played
W: Wins; L: Losses; GB: Games back; PCT: Win percentage; Home: Record at Home; Road: Record on the Road; GF: Goals scored; GA: Goals allowed
Differential: Difference between goals scored and allowed; GF/GP: Average number of goals scored per game; GA/GP: Average number of goals allowed per game

=== Game log ===
Game	Date	Opponent	Location	Score	OT	Attendance	Record
1	January 9, 2009	@ Portland LumberJax	Rose Garden	W 12–10		6,859	1–0
2	January 10, 2009	Portland LumberJax	Pepsi Center	L 5–14		16,987	1–1
3	January 24, 2009	Edmonton Rush	Pepsi Center	L 9–11		16,734	1–2
4	January 31, 2009	New York Titans	Pepsi Center	W 12–8		15,023	2–2
5	February 7, 2009	@ Minnesota Swarm	Xcel Energy Center	W 13–8		11,174	3–2
6	February 14, 2009	Calgary Roughnecks	Pepsi Center	W 13–12		17,712	4–2
7	February 21, 2009	@ San Jose Stealth	HP Pavilion at San Jose	L 9–14		5,576	4–3
8	February 22, 2009	@ Edmonton Rush	Rexall Place	L 9–10		7,249	4–4
9	March 14, 2009	@ San Jose Stealth	HP Pavilion at San Jose	W 14–11		3,535	5–4
10	March 21, 2009	@ Calgary Roughnecks	Pengrowth Saddledome	L 10–13		10,958	5–5
11	March 22, 2009	Minnesota Swarm	Pepsi Center	W 13–11		15,594	6–5
12	March 28, 2009	@ Philadelphia Wings	Wachovia Center	L 13–17		11,876	6–6
13	April 3, 2009	Rochester Knighthawks	Pepsi Center	L 8–12		16,834	6–7
14	April 4, 2009	@ Portland LumberJax	Rose Garden	L 12–13	OT	7,859	6–8
15	April 11, 2009	San Jose Stealth	Pepsi Center	L 10–11	OT	16,189	6–9
16	April 17, 2009	Edmonton Rush	Pepsi Center	W 10–9		16,727	7–9

== Playoffs ==
=== Game log ===
Game	Date	Opponent	Location	Score	OT	Attendance	Record
Division Semifinal	May 3, 2009	@ Calgary Roughnecks	Pengrowth Saddledome	L 8–15		9,760	0–1

== Player stats ==
=== Runners (Top 10) ===
Note: GP = Games played; G = Goals; A = Assists; Pts = Points; LB = Loose balls; PIM = Penalty minutes

Player	GP	G	A	Pts	LB	PIM
Brian Langtry	16	38	41	79	80	24
Gavin Prout	16	26	48	74	96	14
Jamie Shewchuk	16	20	33	53	70	16
Gary Rosyski	15	15	36	51	54	25
Jed Prossner	14	15	20	35	34	4
Chris Gill	11	17	4	21	22	4
Nick Carlson	16	4	14	18	83	20
Tyler Crompton	13	9	5	14	35	18
Matt Danowski	9	7	7	14	18	2
Totals		271	443	331	1083	45

=== Goaltenders ===
Note: GP = Games played; MIN = Minutes; W = Wins; L = Losses; GA = Goals against; Sv% = Save percentage; GAA = Goals against average

Player	GP	MIN	W	L	GA	Sv%	GAA
Andrew Leyshon	16	752:06	5	7	137	.774	10.93
Curtis Palidwor	9	111:51	1	1	22	.756	11.80
Gee Nash	3	106:44	1	1	24	.696	13.49
Jeremy Ogden	1	1:09	0	0	0	.000	.00
Totals			7	9	184	.763	11.50

== Transactions ==
=== New players ===
- John Gallant - acquired in trade
- Andrew Leyshon - signed as free agent
- Andrew Potter - acquired in trade
- Jay Preece - signed as free agent
- Gary Rosyski - signed as free agent

=== Players not returning ===
- Jason Bloom - traded
- Jordan Cornfield - released
- Josh Sims - retired
- Dave Stilley - traded

=== Trades ===
March 7, 2009	To Colorado Mammoth Curtis Palidwor	To Toronto Rock Second round pick, 2010 entry draft
February 26, 2009	To Colorado Mammoth Second round pick, 2010 entry draft	To Toronto Rock Curtis Palidwor
November 17, 2008	To Colorado Mammoth conditional pick, 2009 entry draft	To New York Titans Dave Stilley
October 15, 2008	To Colorado Mammoth Andrew Potter; 1st round pick, 2009 entry draft 1st round pick, 2010 entry draft	To Rochester Knighthawks Gary Gait
September 15, 2008	To Colorado Mammoth John Gallant	To Boston Blazers Jason Bloom; 5th round pick, 2008 entry draft

=== Entry draft ===
The 2008 NLL Entry Draft took place on September 7, 2008. The Mammoth selected the following players:

Round	Overall	Player	College/Club
1	7	Matt Danowski	Duke University
3	31	Mike Ward	Duke University
4	43	Terry Kiminer	UMBC
6	69	Ryan McFadyen	Duke University

== Roster ==
2009 Colorado Mammoth roster
Active (21-man) roster		Inactive roster	Coaches
Goaltenders: 41 (Canada) Andrew Leyshon; 30 (United States) Jeremy Ogden; -- (Canada) Curtis Palidwor; Defensemen: 48 (Canada) Rich Catton; 28 (United States) Tom Ethington; 14 (United States) Steve Forsythe; 11 (Canada) John Gallant; 23 (Canada) Ray Guze; 66 (Canada) Matt Leveque; 20 (Canada) Bruce Murray	Forwards: 44 (Canada) Dan Carey; 15 (Canada) Tyler Crompton; 40 (United States) Matt Danowski; 25 (Canada) Chris Gill; 6 (United States) Brian Langtry; 26 (Canada) Andrew Potter; 1 (United States) Jed Prossner; 9 (Canada) Gavin Prout (C); 21 (Canada) Gary Rosyski; 85 (Canada) Jamie Shewchuk; Transition: 3 (United States) Tim Booth; 8 (Canada) Nick Carlson; 7 (Canada) Bryan Safarik; 5 (United States) Mike Ward	Injured reserve: 10 (Canada) Nenad Gajic; 55 (Canada) Jim Moss; 38 (Canada) Gee Nash; Holdout: 23 (United States) Chris Gill	Head coach {{{Head Coach}}} Legend: * Suspended list; (C) Captain; (A) Alternate captain; NLL Transactions

== See also ==
- 2009 NLL season
