= 2009 Minnesota Swarm season =

2009 Minnesota Swarm
- League: NLL
- Division: 5th West
- 2009 record: 6-10
- Home record: 2-6
- Road record: 4-4
- Goals for: 174
- Goals against: 198
- General Manager: Marty O'Neill
- Coach: Duane Jacobs
- Captain: Ryan Cousins
- Alternate captains: Ryan Ward
- Arena: Xcel Energy Center
- Average attendance: 12,308

Team leaders
- Goals: Sean Pollock (26)
- Assists: Sean Pollock (39)
- Points: Sean Pollock (65)
- Penalties in minutes: Ryan Sharp (34)
- Loose Balls: Ryan Sharp (89)
- Wins: Kevin Croswell (3); Nick Patterson (3)
- Goals against average: Kevin Croswell (11.21)

The Minnesota Swarm are a lacrosse team based in Minnesota playing in the National Lacrosse League (NLL). The 2009 season was the 5th in franchise history.

The Swarm played their first four seasons in the East division, but because of the addition of the Boston Blazers and the demise of the Arizona Sting, they were moved to the West division for the 2009 season.

== Regular season ==
=== Conference standings ===
East Division
P	Team	GP	W	L	PCT	GB	Home	Road	GF	GA	Diff	GF/GP	GA/GP
1	New York Titans – xy	16	10	6	.625	0.0	5–3	5–3	190	180	+10	11.88	11.25
2	Buffalo Bandits – x	16	10	6	.625	0.0	5–3	5–3	223	170	+53	13.94	10.62
3	Boston Blazers – x	16	10	6	.625	0.0	4–4	6–2	181	168	+13	11.31	10.50
4	Rochester Knighthawks – x	16	7	9	.438	3.0	6–2	1–7	169	197	−28	10.56	12.31
5	Philadelphia Wings	16	7	9	.438	3.0	4–4	3–5	188	193	−5	11.75	12.06
6	Toronto Rock	16	6	10	.375	4.0	3–5	3–5	194	218	−24	12.12	13.62

West Division
P	Team	GP	W	L	PCT	GB	Home	Road	GF	GA	Diff	GF/GP	GA/GP
1	Calgary Roughnecks – xyz	16	12	4	.750	0.0	5–3	7–1	206	167	+39	12.88	10.44
2	Portland LumberJax – x	16	9	7	.562	3.0	4–4	5–3	181	177	+4	11.31	11.06
3	San Jose Stealth – x	16	7	9	.438	5.0	5–3	2–6	200	185	+15	12.50	11.56
4	Colorado Mammoth – x	16	7	9	.438	5.0	4–4	3–5	172	184	−12	10.75	11.50
5	Minnesota Swarm	16	6	10	.375	6.0	2–6	4–4	174	198	−24	10.88	12.38
6	Edmonton Rush	16	5	11	.312	7.0	4–4	1–7	159	200	−41	9.94	12.50

x: Clinched playoff berth; c: Clinched playoff berth by crossing over to another division; y: Clinched division; z: Clinched best regular season record; GP: Games Played
W: Wins; L: Losses; GB: Games back; PCT: Win percentage; Home: Record at Home; Road: Record on the Road; GF: Goals scored; GA: Goals allowed
Differential: Difference between goals scored and allowed; GF/GP: Average number of goals scored per game; GA/GP: Average number of goals allowed per game

=== Game log ===
Game	Date	Opponent	Location	Score	OT	Attendance	Record
1	January 3, 2009	@ Portland LumberJax	Rose Garden	W 11–7		7,121	1–0
2	January 10, 2009	San Jose Stealth	Xcel Energy Center	W 10–7		13,094	2–0
3	January 24, 2009	Buffalo Bandits	Xcel Energy Center	L 9–10		11,458	2–1
4	February 6, 2009	@ Calgary Roughnecks	Pengrowth Saddledome	L 8–13		10,090	2–2
5	February 7, 2009	Colorado Mammoth	Xcel Energy Center	L 8–13		11,174	2–3
6	February 20, 2009	Boston Blazers	Xcel Energy Center	L 12–16		12,106	2–4
7	February 21, 2009	@ Philadelphia Wings	Wachovia Center	L 12–13		10,559	2–5
8	February 27, 2009	@ Toronto Rock	Air Canada Centre	W 13–10		13,324	3–5
9	February 28, 2009	@ Buffalo Bandits	HSBC Arena	W 16–15		18,690	4–5
10	March 14, 2009	@ Philadelphia Wings	Wachovia Center	W 13–12		10,160	5–5
11	March 22, 2009	@ Colorado Mammoth	Pepsi Center	L 11–13		15,594	5–6
12	March 28, 2009	Calgary Roughnecks	Xcel Energy Center	L 10–13		12,364	5–7
13	April 3, 2009	@ San Jose Stealth	HP Pavilion at San Jose	L 8–18		5,618	5–8
14	April 4, 2009	Edmonton Rush	Xcel Energy Center	W 9–7		12,476	6–8
15	April 11, 2009	Portland LumberJax	Xcel Energy Center	L 14–19		12,574	6–9
16	April 18, 2009	New York Titans	Xcel Energy Center	L 10–12		13,219	6–10

== Player stats ==
=== Runners (Top 10) ===
Note: GP = Games played; G = Goals; A = Assists; Pts = Points; LB = Loose balls; PIM = Penalty minutes

Player	GP	G	A	Pts	LB	PIM
Sean Pollock	15	26	39	65	74	14
Ryan Ward	15	20	36	56	58	4
Kevin Buchanan	11	22	23	45	58	2
Dan Marohl	13	20	25	45	35	2
Aaron Wilson	10	22	21	43	46	6
Kevin Ross	16	20	23	43	47	8
Chad Culp	15	12	23	35	87	7
Andrew Watt	13	6	11	17	68	10
Kevin Fines	12	6	5	11	65	8
Totals		281	455	262	1180	32

=== Goaltenders ===
Note: GP = Games played; MIN = Minutes; W = Wins; L = Losses; GA = Goals against; Sv% = Save percentage; GAA = Goals against average

Player	GP	MIN	W	L	GA	Sv%	GAA
Kevin Croswell	16	519:13	3	4	97	.773	11.21
Nick Patterson	16	440:36	3	6	100	.713	13.62
Totals			6	10	198	.746	12.38

== Transactions ==
=== Players not returning ===
- Andrew Biers - traded
- Chris Courtney - traded
- Chris McKay - traded

=== Trades ===
November 19, 2008	To Minnesota Swarm fourth round pick, 2010 entry draft	To Rochester Knighthawks Chris Courtney
September 7, 2008	To Minnesota Swarm 8th overall pick, 2008 entry draft	To Edmonton Rush Andrew Biers; 10th overall pick, 2008 entry draft
July 1, 2008	To Minnesota Swarm second round pick, 2008 entry draft	To Edmonton Rush Chris McKay

=== Entry draft ===
The 2008 NLL Entry Draft took place on September 7, 2008. The Swarm selected the following players:

Round	Overall	Player	College/Club
1	8	Andrew Watt	Robert Morris College
1	11	Kevin Buchanan	Ohio State University
1	13	Joe Cinosky	University of Maryland
2	24	Tom Michaelsen	St John's University
4	38	Ricky Pages	Ohio State University
4	40	Justin Haworth	Limestone College
6	73	Bruce Bickford	Drexel University

== Roster ==
2009 Minnesota Swarm roster
Active (21-man) roster		Inactive roster	Coaches
Goaltenders: 31 (Canada) Kevin Croswell; 93 (Canada) Nick Patterson; Defensemen: 4 (United States) Joe Cinosky; 50 (Canada) Ryan Cousins (C); 21 (Canada) Kevin Fines; 5 (United States) Josh Funk; 28 (Canada) Darren Halls; 34 (Canada) Nick Inch; 12 (Canada) Eric Pacey; 23 (Canada) Jon Sullivan	Forwards: 27 (United States) Colin Achenbach; 33 (United States) Kevin Buchanan; 19 (Canada) Chad Culp; 47 (Haudenosaunee) Travis Hill; 7 (United States) Dan Marohl; 8 (Canada) Rory McDade; 17 (Canada) Sean Pollock; 71 (Canada) Kevin Ross; 16 (Canada) Noah Talbot; 44 (Canada) Ryan Ward (A); 22 (Canada) Andrew Watt; 10 (Canada) Aaron Wilson; Transition: 26 (Canada) Ryan Sharp	Practice squad: -- (United States) Bruce Bickford; 15 (Canada) Brad Favero; 55 (Canada) Angus Goodleaf; 14 (Canada) Marc Jackson; 11 (United States) Tom Michaelson; 13 (United States) Ricky Pages; -- (United States) Ross Zimmerman	Head coach {{{Head Coach}}} Legend: * Suspended list; (C) Captain; (A) Alternate captain; NLL Transactions

== See also ==
- 2009 NLL season
