= Kyle Wailes =

Canadian lacrosse player

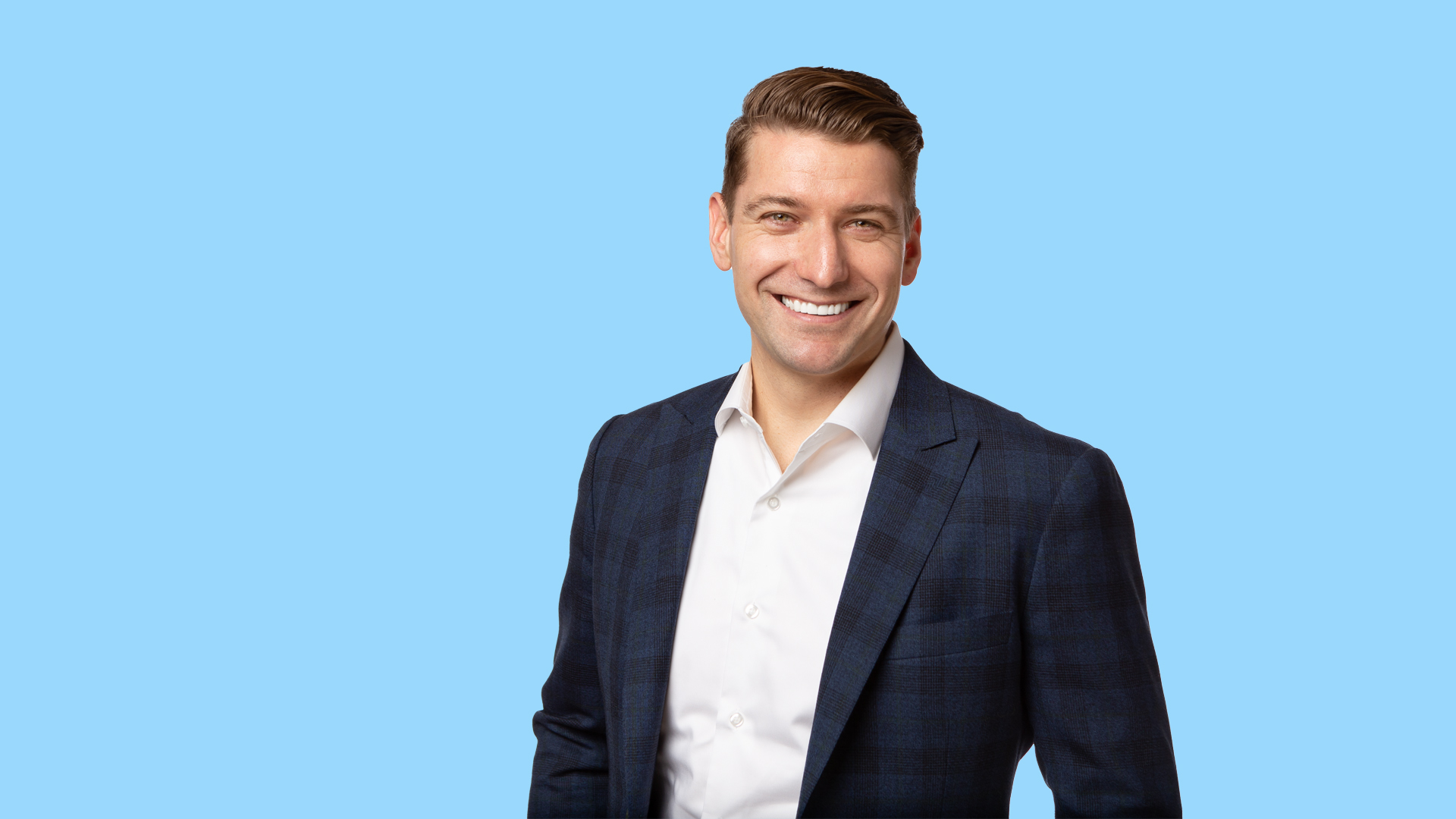

Personal information
- Born: October 19, 1983 (age 42) Scarborough, Ontario, Canada
- Height: 6 ft 1 in (185 cm)
- Weight: 205 lb (93 kg; 14 st 9 lb)

Sport
- Position: Forward
- Shoots: Left
- NLL draft: 9th overall, 2006; Calgary Roughnecks
- NLL team Former teams: Philadelphia Wings; Calgary Roughnecks
- Pro career: 2007–

Kyle Wailes (born October 19, 1983 in Scarborough, Ontario) is a former Canadian indoor lacrosse player. Wailes played for the Philadelphia Wings of the National Lacrosse League, and played collegiate lacrosse at Brown University. Wailes was also a junior hockey player in the Ontario Hockey League.

== National Lacrosse League career ==
Wailes was a first-round draft pick (5th overall) by the Calgary Roughnecks in the 2006 NLL Entry Draft. Wailes was acquired by the Philadelphia Wings from Calgary on December 18, 2006 in exchange for the Wings’ first pick in the 2007 NLL Entry Draft. He was named the NLL's Rookie of the Week in both Week 3 and Week 8 of the 2007 season.

After sitting out the 2008 NLL season due to work visa problems, Wailes will rejoin the Philadelphia Wings for the 2009 season after signing a four-year contract with the team.

== College career ==
Wailes graduated from Brown University with a bachelor's degree in pre-medicine and neuroscience and holds an M.B.A. from the Kellogg School of Management at Northwestern University. As a junior at Brown University, he led the Bears collegiate lacrosse in scoring with 35 points (5 goals, 30 assists) and was named to the All-Ivy League Team.

== Canadian Box career ==
=== Junior ===
In 2000, Wailes led the OLA Jr. B league in assists with the Clarington Green Gaels, who won the Founders Cup Championship. Wailes twice won the OLA Jr. A scoring title with the Toronto Beaches. In 2004, he was named league MVP, and was awarded the "Jim Veltman Award" for Most Outstanding Player and the "B.W. Evans Award" for Top Graduating Player.

=== Senior ===
Wailes was selected first overall in the 2005 Major Series Lacrosse draft by the Brooklin Redmen. However, Wailes only played five games during his rookie season and has not played Senior lacrosse since.

== Hockey career ==
Wailes played hockey in the Ontario Hockey League with the Barrie Colts and the Sault Ste. Marie Greyhounds. In the 1999-2000 season, he was a member of the OHL Champion Barrie Colts.

== Career statistics ==
=== NLL ===
		Regular Season						Playoffs
Season	Team	GP	G	A	Pts	LB	PIM	GP	G	A	Pts	LB	PIM
2007	Philadelphia	11	16	21	37	41	8	0	0	0	0	0	0
2009	Philadelphia	14	15	41	56	43	8	0	0	0	0	0	0
NLL totals		25	31	62	93	84	16	0	0	0	0	0	0

=== OLA ===
			Regular Season					Playoffs
Season	Team	League	GP	G	A	Pts	PIM	GP	G	A	Pts	PIM
1998	Clarington Green Gaels	OLA Jr.B	1	0	0	0	0	3	0	1	1	0
1998	Whitby Warriors	OLA Jr.A	1	0	0	0	0	0	0	0	0	0
1999	Clarington Green Gaels	OLA Jr.B	1	0	3	3	6	0	0	0	0	0
2000	Clarington Green Gaels	OLA Jr.B	9	8	14	22	43	9	7	26	33	0
2001	Orillia Rama Kings	OLA Jr.A	19	14	54	68	25	6	5	11	16	2
2002	Toronto Beaches	OLA Jr.A	16	20	44	64	28	18	13	36	49	12
2003	Toronto Beaches	OLA Jr.A	18	30	65	95	8	11	18	42	60	6
2004	Toronto Beaches	OLA Jr.A	19	31	76	107	28	11	13	25	38	22
2005	Brooklin Redmen	MSL	5	3	8	11	0	0	0	0	0	0
Junior A Totals			173	95	239	334	89	56	54	114	168	42
Junior B Totals			11	8	17	25	49	12	7	27	34	0
Senior A Totals			5	3	8	11	0	0	0	0	0	0
