= 2009 Portland LumberJax season =

2009 Portland LumberJax
- League: NLL
- Division: 2nd West
- 2009 record: 9-7
- Home record: 4-4
- Road record: 5-3
- Goals for: 181
- Goals against: 177
- General Manager: Derek Keenan
- Coach: Derek Keenan
- Captain: Pat Jones
- Alternate captains: Brodie Merrill
- Arena: Rose Garden Arena
- Average attendance: 8,682

Team leaders
- Goals: Peter Morgan (29)
- Assists: Ryan Powell (44)
- Points: Ryan Powell (62)
- Penalties in minutes: Derek Malawsky (42)
- Loose Balls: Brodie Merrill (216)
- Wins: Matt Disher (8)
- Goals against average: Matt Disher (10.80)

The Portland LumberJax are a lacrosse team based in Portland, Oregon playing in the National Lacrosse League (NLL). The 2009 season will be the 4th in franchise history.

== Regular season ==
=== Conference standings ===
East Division
P	Team	GP	W	L	PCT	GB	Home	Road	GF	GA	Diff	GF/GP	GA/GP
1	New York Titans – xy	16	10	6	.625	0.0	5–3	5–3	190	180	+10	11.88	11.25
2	Buffalo Bandits – x	16	10	6	.625	0.0	5–3	5–3	223	170	+53	13.94	10.62
3	Boston Blazers – x	16	10	6	.625	0.0	4–4	6–2	181	168	+13	11.31	10.50
4	Rochester Knighthawks – x	16	7	9	.438	3.0	6–2	1–7	169	197	−28	10.56	12.31
5	Philadelphia Wings	16	7	9	.438	3.0	4–4	3–5	188	193	−5	11.75	12.06
6	Toronto Rock	16	6	10	.375	4.0	3–5	3–5	194	218	−24	12.12	13.62

West Division
P	Team	GP	W	L	PCT	GB	Home	Road	GF	GA	Diff	GF/GP	GA/GP
1	Calgary Roughnecks – xyz	16	12	4	.750	0.0	5–3	7–1	206	167	+39	12.88	10.44
2	Portland LumberJax – x	16	9	7	.562	3.0	4–4	5–3	181	177	+4	11.31	11.06
3	San Jose Stealth – x	16	7	9	.438	5.0	5–3	2–6	200	185	+15	12.50	11.56
4	Colorado Mammoth – x	16	7	9	.438	5.0	4–4	3–5	172	184	−12	10.75	11.50
5	Minnesota Swarm	16	6	10	.375	6.0	2–6	4–4	174	198	−24	10.88	12.38
6	Edmonton Rush	16	5	11	.312	7.0	4–4	1–7	159	200	−41	9.94	12.50

x: Clinched playoff berth; c: Clinched playoff berth by crossing over to another division; y: Clinched division; z: Clinched best regular season record; GP: Games Played
W: Wins; L: Losses; GB: Games back; PCT: Win percentage; Home: Record at Home; Road: Record on the Road; GF: Goals scored; GA: Goals allowed
Differential: Difference between goals scored and allowed; GF/GP: Average number of goals scored per game; GA/GP: Average number of goals allowed per game

=== Game log ===
Game	Date	Opponent	Location	Score	OT	Attendance	Record
1	January 3, 2009	Minnesota Swarm	Rose Garden	L 7–11		7,121	0–1
2	January 9, 2009	Colorado Mammoth	Rose Garden	L 10–12		6,859	0–2
3	January 10, 2009	@ Colorado Mammoth	Pepsi Center	W 14–5		16,987	1–2
4	January 16, 2009	@ Edmonton Rush	Rexall Place	L 10–11		8,017	1–3
5	January 23, 2009	Edmonton Rush	Rose Garden	W 15–10		6,894	2–3
6	January 31, 2009	@ Boston Blazers	TD Banknorth Garden	W 9–8	OT	5,029	3–3
7	February 7, 2009	San Jose Stealth	Rose Garden	W 16–13		6,943	4–3
8	February 28, 2009	Philadelphia Wings	Rose Garden	W 12–10		8,560	5–3
9	March 21, 2009	@ Buffalo Bandits	HSBC Arena	L 4–14		17,822	5–4
10	March 28, 2009	@ San Jose Stealth	HP Pavilion at San Jose	W 14–12		3,018	6–4
11	March 29, 2009	San Jose Stealth	Rose Garden	L 8–13		6,473	6–5
12	April 3, 2009	@ Edmonton Rush	Rexall Place	L 10–11		6,517	6–6
13	April 4, 2009	Colorado Mammoth	Rose Garden	W 13–12	OT	7,859	7–6
14	April 10, 2009	@ Calgary Roughnecks	Pengrowth Saddledome	W 11–9		10,387	8–6
15	April 11, 2009	@ Minnesota Swarm	Xcel Energy Center	W 19–14		12,574	9–6
16	April 17, 2009	Calgary Roughnecks	Rose Garden	L 9–12		7,855	9–7

== Playoffs ==
=== Game log ===
Game	Date	Opponent	Location	Score	OT	Attendance	Record
Division Semifinal	May 1, 2009	San Jose Stealth	Rose Garden	L 16–20		6,053	0–1

== Player stats ==
=== Runners (Top 10) ===
Note: GP = Games played; G = Goals; A = Assists; Pts = Points; LB = Loose balls; PIM = Penalty minutes

Player	GP	G	A	Pts	LB	PIM
Ryan Powell	16	18	44	62	67	8
Cory Conway	15	23	34	57	63	17
Peter Morgan	13	29	24	53	53	6
Derek Malawsky	16	19	33	52	70	42
Brodie Merrill	16	14	33	47	216	38
Scott Stewart	15	13	18	31	98	2
Pete Jacobs	16	20	9	29	54	2
Tim Campeau	11	13	15	28	28	10
Dan Stroup	14	9	8	17	35	14
Totals		280	461	347	1052	30

=== Goaltenders ===
Note: GP = Games played; MIN = Minutes; W = Wins; L = Losses; GA = Goals against; Sv% = Save percentage; GAA = Goals against average

Player	GP	MIN	W	L	GA	Sv%	GAA
Matt Disher	13	733:25	8	5	132	.792	10.80
Matthew Flindell	9	124:09	1	1	24	.789	11.60
Joel Weber	10	107:48	0	1	21	.761	11.69
Totals			9	7	177	.788	11.06

== Transactions ==
=== New players ===
- Matt Brown - acquired in trade
- Luke Forget - acquired in trade
- Jamison Koesterer - acquired in trade
- Brad MacDonald - acquired in trade
- Dan Stroup - signed as free agent

=== Players not returning ===
- Dan Dawson - lost in Arizona dispersal draft
- Dallas Eliuk - retired
- Matt Holman - traded
- Spencer Martin - traded
- Scott Stapleford - released

=== Trades ===
November 19, 2008	To Portland LumberJax Jamison Koesterer	To New York Titans conditional pick, 2009 or 2010 entry draft
September 15, 2008	To Portland LumberJax Matt Brown	To Edmonton Rush Spencer Martin
July 7, 2008	To Portland LumberJax Brad MacDonald	To Chicago Shamrox Matt Holman second round selection, 2009 entry draft
December 9, 2008	To Portland LumberJax Luke Forget	To Rochester Knighthawks second round selection, 2009 entry draft

=== Entry draft ===
The 2008 NLL Entry Draft took place on September 7, 2008. The LumberJax selected the following players:

Round	Overall	Player	College/Club
1	12	Tim Campeau	Notre Dame de Namur University
3	34	Matthew Yager	Victoria, BC
4	48	Dayne Michaud	Seton Hill University
5	61	Matt Flindell	Victoria, BC
6	74	Sean Robinson	New Westminster, BC

== Roster ==
2009 Portland LumberJax roster
Active (21-man) roster		Inactive roster	Coaches
Goaltenders: 39 (Canada) Matt Disher; 30 (Canada) Matt Flindell; 41 (Canada) Joel Weber; Defensemen: 49 (Canada) Bruce Alexander; 36 (Canada) Luke Forget; 12 (Canada) Pat Jones (C); 17 (Canada) Brodie Merrill (A); 21 (Canada) Dayne Michaud; 13 (Canada) David Morgan; 33 (Canada) Richard Morgan	Forwards: 16 (Canada) Matt Brown; 15 (Canada) Tim Campeau; 91 (Canada) Cory Conway; 1 (Haudenosaunee) Peter Jacobs; 11 (Canada) Derek Lowe; 18 (Canada) Derek Malawsky; 44 (Canada) Peter Morgan; 22 (United States) Ryan Powell; 8 (Canada) Scott Stewart; 88 (Canada) Dan Stroup; Transition: 7 (Canada) Tyler Codron; 56 (United States) Jamison Koesterer; 9 (Canada) Matt Yager		Head coach {{{Head Coach}}} Legend: * Suspended list; (C) Captain; (A) Alternate captain; NLL Transactions

== See also ==
- 2009 NLL season
