= 2009 Buffalo Bandits season =

2009 Buffalo Bandits
- League: NLL
- Division: 2nd East
- 2009 record: 10–6
- Home record: 5–3
- Road record: 5–3
- Goals for: 223
- Goals against: 170
- General Manager: Darris Kilgour
- Coach: Darris Kilgour
- Captain: Rich Kilgour
- Alternate captains: Mike Accursi; John Tavares
- Arena: HSBC Arena
- Average attendance: 17,947

Team leaders
- Goals: Mark Steenhuis (51); John Tavares (51)
- Assists: Mark Steenhuis (50)
- Points: Mark Steenhuis (101)
- Penalties in minutes: Chris White (47)
- Loose Balls: Phil Sanderson (137)
- Wins: Ken Montour (8)
- Goals against average: Ken Montour (9.57)

The Buffalo Bandits are a lacrosse team based in Buffalo, New York playing in the National Lacrosse League (NLL). The 2009 season was the franchise's 18th season. It was also their first season in title defense since 1997.

The Bandits finished the season with a 10–6 record, good for 2nd in the East, finishing in a three-way tie with New York and Boston. The Bandits defeated the Boston Blazers in the Division Semifinal, 11–8. However, the Bandits failed to defend their title, as they wound up losing to the New York Titans, 9–3, in the Division Final.

== Regular season ==
=== Conference standings ===
East Division
P	Team	GP	W	L	PCT	GB	Home	Road	GF	GA	Diff	GF/GP	GA/GP
1	New York Titans – xy	16	10	6	.625	0.0	5–3	5–3	190	180	+10	11.88	11.25
2	Buffalo Bandits – x	16	10	6	.625	0.0	5–3	5–3	223	170	+53	13.94	10.62
3	Boston Blazers – x	16	10	6	.625	0.0	4–4	6–2	181	168	+13	11.31	10.50
4	Rochester Knighthawks – x	16	7	9	.438	3.0	6–2	1–7	169	197	−28	10.56	12.31
5	Philadelphia Wings	16	7	9	.438	3.0	4–4	3–5	188	193	−5	11.75	12.06
6	Toronto Rock	16	6	10	.375	4.0	3–5	3–5	194	218	−24	12.12	13.62

West Division
P	Team	GP	W	L	PCT	GB	Home	Road	GF	GA	Diff	GF/GP	GA/GP
1	Calgary Roughnecks – xyz	16	12	4	.750	0.0	5–3	7–1	206	167	+39	12.88	10.44
2	Portland LumberJax – x	16	9	7	.562	3.0	4–4	5–3	181	177	+4	11.31	11.06
3	San Jose Stealth – x	16	7	9	.438	5.0	5–3	2–6	200	185	+15	12.50	11.56
4	Colorado Mammoth – x	16	7	9	.438	5.0	4–4	3–5	172	184	−12	10.75	11.50
5	Minnesota Swarm	16	6	10	.375	6.0	2–6	4–4	174	198	−24	10.88	12.38
6	Edmonton Rush	16	5	11	.312	7.0	4–4	1–7	159	200	−41	9.94	12.50

x: Clinched playoff berth; c: Clinched playoff berth by crossing over to another division; y: Clinched division; z: Clinched best regular season record; GP: Games Played
W: Wins; L: Losses; GB: Games back; PCT: Win percentage; Home: Record at Home; Road: Record on the Road; GF: Goals scored; GA: Goals allowed
Differential: Difference between goals scored and allowed; GF/GP: Average number of goals scored per game; GA/GP: Average number of goals allowed per game

=== Game log ===
Game	Date	Opponent	Location	Score	OT	Attendance	Record
1	January 3, 2009	Philadelphia Wings	HSBC Arena	W 15–11		18,690	1–0
2	January 10, 2009	@ Toronto Rock	Air Canada Centre	W 8–6		15,923	2–0
3	January 16, 2009	Rochester Knighthawks	HSBC Arena	W 23–6		15,494	3–0
4	January 24, 2009	@ Minnesota Swarm	Xcel Energy Center	W 10–9		11,458	4–0
5	January 29, 2009	@ Edmonton Rush	Rexall Place	W 13–8		6,298	5–0
6	February 6, 2009	@ Philadelphia Wings	Wachovia Center	L 11–13		10,506	5–1
7	February 14, 2009	Toronto Rock	HSBC Arena	W 25–10		18,690	6–1
8	February 20, 2009	@ Toronto Rock	Air Canada Centre	W 17–16	OT	12,844	7–1
9	February 28, 2009	Minnesota Swarm	HSBC Arena	L 15–16		18,690	7–2
10	March 14, 2009	@ Rochester Knighthawks	Blue Cross Arena	L 14–15	OT	9,134	7–3
11	March 21, 2009	Portland LumberJax	HSBC Arena	W 14–4		17,822	8–3
12	March 28, 2009	New York Titans	HSBC Arena	L 9–11		18,550	8–4
13	April 4, 2009	@ Boston Blazers	TD Banknorth Garden	W 15–11		7,073	9–4
14	April 10, 2009	Rochester Knighthawks	HSBC Arena	W 13–9		17,118	10–4
15	April 11, 2009	@ New York Titans	Prudential Center	L 9–12		6,222	10–5
16	April 18, 2009	Boston Blazers	HSBC Arena	L 12–13	OT	18,527	10–6

== Playoffs ==
=== Game log ===
Game	Date	Opponent	Location	Score	OT	Attendance	Record
Division Semifinal	May 2, 2009	Boston Blazers	HSBC Arena	W 11–8		13,343	1–0
Division Final	May 9, 2009	@ New York Titans	Prudential Center	L 3–9		5,644	1–1

== Player stats ==
=== Runners (Top 10) ===
Note: GP = Games played; G = Goals; A = Assists; Pts = Points; LB = Loose balls; PIM = Penalty minutes

Player	GP	G	A	Pts	LB	PIM
Mark Steenhuis	16	51	50	101	117	24
John Tavares	16	51	43	94	98	6
Mike Accursi	16	30	30	60	66	4
Cory Bomberry	15	15	36	51	46	11
Roger Vyse	15	27	19	46	57	0
Sean Greenhalgh	15	15	22	37	51	0
Kevin Dostie	14	8	18	26	28	4
Thomas Montour	12	5	15	20	90	4
Pat McCready	9	4	12	16	55	24
Totals		324	547	327	1073	40

=== Goaltenders ===
Note: GP = Games played; MIN = Minutes; W = Wins; L = Losses; GA = Goals against; Sv% = Save percentage; GAA = Goals against average

Player	GP	MIN	W	L	GA	Sv%	GAA
Ken Montour	15	651:46	8	3	104	.813	9.57
Mike Thompson	16	313:49	2	3	66	.759	12.62
Totals			10	6	170	.795	10.63

== Transactions ==
=== New players ===
- Sean Greenhalgh - acquired prior to last season, but did not play due to injury

=== Players not returning ===
- Kyle Laverty - selected in expansion draft

=== Trades ===
July 2, 2008	To Buffalo Bandits third round pick, 2009 entry draft	To Edmonton Rush Greg Hinman^{*}
December 13, 2008	To Buffalo Bandits Thomas Montour	To Calgary Roughnecks first round pick, 2009 entry draft

^{*} - Hinman was acquired from the Arizona Sting in the dispersal draft

=== Entry draft ===
The 2008 NLL Entry Draft took place on September 7, 2008. The Bandits selected the following players:

Round	Overall	Player	College/Club
3	35	Eryn Jones	Six Nations, ON
4	49	Tory Gardner	Six Nations, ON
5	62	Shane Pollock	Wallaceburg, ON
6	65	Dustin Dunn	Potsdam State University

== Roster ==
2009 Buffalo Bandits roster
Active (21-man) roster		Inactive roster	Coaches
Goaltenders: 29 (Haudenosaunee) Ken Montour; 66 (Haudenosaunee) Michael Thompson; Defensemen: 28 (Haudenosaunee) Clay Hill; 16 (Haudenosaunee) Rich Kilgour (C); 2 (Canada) Ian Llord; 10 (Canada) Pat McCready; 18 (Canada) Phil Sanderson; 24 (United States) Kyle Schmelzle; 3 (Canada) Billy Dee Smith; 14 (United States) Joe Smith; 6 (Canada) Chris White	Forwards: 44 (Canada) Mike Accursi (A); 72 (Haudenosaunee) Cory Bomberry; 26 (Haudenosaunee) Brett Bucktooth; 12 (Canada) Brian Croswell; 51 (Canada) Kevin Dostie; 84 (Haudenosaunee) Brandon Francis; 19 (Canada) Sean Greenhalgh; 8 (Haudenosaunee) Delby Powless; 11 (Canada) John Tavares (A); 81 (Haudenosaunee) Roger Vyse; Transition: 63 (Haudenosaunee) Thomas Montour; 9 (Canada) Mark Steenhuis	Practice squad: 27 Dustin Dunn; 17 (Haudenosaunee) Brandon Swamp; 39 Findley Wilson; Holdout: 88 (Haudenosaunee) Cody Jacobs; Unable to play: -- Tory Gardner; -- Eryn Jones	Head coach {{{Head Coach}}} Legend: * Suspended list; (C) Captain; (A) Alternate captain; NLL Transactions

== See also ==
- 2009 NLL season
