= Sean Thomson =

Canadian lacrosse player (born 1985)

Personal information
- Nationality: Canadian
- Born: January 28, 1985 (age 41) Burlington, Ontario, Canada
- Height: 6 ft 2 in (188 cm)
- Weight: 220 lb (100 kg; 15 st 10 lb)

Sport
- Position: Attack
- Shoots: Left
- NLL draft: 9th overall, 2008; Philadelphia Wings
- NLL team Former teams: Minnesota Swarm; Philadelphia Wings
- College team: Guelph University
- Pro career: 2009–

Sean Thomson (born January 28, 1985) is a Canadian lacrosse player who played in the National Lacrosse League. Thomson played one season for the Philadelphia Wings before being traded to the Minnesota Swarm in 2010 for Kevin Colleluori.

Thomson was a member of the Peterborough Lakers during their 2007 Mann Cup championship season. While attending Guelph University, Thomson was a member of the Gryphons who won the 2008 Canadian University Field Lacrosse Association championship. Though he did not play for the Gryphons in 2008, he is expected to play in 2009. He was also named 2008 Burlington Male Athlete of the Year Award. Thomson also played lacrosse at Bellarmine University before transferring to Guelph.

== National Lacrosse League career ==
Thomson was selected with the first round (ninth overall) in the 2008 NLL Entry Draft. He made an immediate impact on the league, earning "Rookie of the Week" honors in Week 2 of the 2009 NLL season.

== Statistics ==
=== NLL ===
		Regular season						Playoffs
Season	Team	GP	G	A	Pts	LB	PIM	GP	G	A	Pts	LB	PIM
2009	Philadelphia	7	5	1	6	8	2	--	--	--	--	--	--
NLL totals		7	5	1	6	8	2	0	0	0	0	0	0
