= Devan Wray =

Lacrosse coach and former transition player

Personal information
- Born: October 2, 1979 (age 46) Edmonton, Alberta, Canada
- Height: 5 ft 10 in (178 cm)
- Weight: 200 lb (91 kg; 14 st 4 lb)

Sport
- Position: transition
- Shoots: right
- NLL draft: 20th overall, 2003; Vancouver Ravens
- NLL team: Calgary Roughnecks
- Pro career: 2004–2011

Devan Wray (born October 2, 1979 in Edmonton, Alberta) is a lacrosse coach and former transition player. He wore #4 for the Calgary Roughnecks in the National Lacrosse League. He was also the defence coach for the Edmonton Rush in 2012 & 2013. Wray has been named the head coach of Team Finland for the 2015 FIL World Indoor Lacrosse Championship.

Prior to the 2011 NLL season, Wray was traded to the Edmonton Rush for a 6th round pick in the 2011 NLL Entry Draft. The Roughnecks later signed Wray off of the Rush practice roster after an injury to Nolan Heavenor before he played any games for the Rush.

Wray's brother Taylor Wray was also a professional lacrosse player. Both of them played college lacrosse for Duke Blue Devils men's lacrosse. He won the Champion's Cup with the Roughnecks in both 2004 and 2009. He also has two Minto Cups with the Burnaby Lakers.

== Statistics ==
=== NLL ===
Devan Wray		Regular season									Playoffs								
Season	Team	GP	G	A	Pts	LB	PIM	Pts/GP	LB/GP	PIM/GP	GP	G	A	Pts	LB	PIM	Pts/GP	LB/GP	PIM/GP
2004	Calgary Roughnecks	14	3	3	6	40	8	0.43	2.86	0.57	3	1	0	1	16	2	0.33	5.33	0.67
2005	Calgary Roughnecks	5	1	3	4	0	6	0.80	0.00	1.20	–	–	–	–	–	–	–	–	–
2006	Calgary Roughnecks	16	1	6	7	86	12	0.44	5.38	0.75	1	0	1	1	5	2	1.00	5.00	2.00
2007	Calgary Roughnecks	16	5	14	19	94	12	1.19	5.88	0.75	1	0	0	0	3	0	0.00	3.00	0.00
2008	Calgary Roughnecks	13	2	9	11	65	9	0.85	5.00	0.69	2	0	1	1	13	0	0.50	6.50	0.00
2009	Calgary Roughnecks	13	1	6	7	61	6	0.54	4.69	0.46	3	0	0	0	17	4	0.00	5.67	1.33
2010	Calgary Roughnecks	6	0	5	5	41	2	0.83	6.83	0.33	1	0	0	0	0	0	0.00	0.00	0.00
2011	Calgary Roughnecks	6	0	0	0	10	2	0.00	1.67	0.33	–	–	–	–	–	–	–	–	–
		89	13	46	59	397	57	0.66	4.46	0.64	11	1	2	3	54	8	0.27	4.91	0.73
Career Total:		100	14	48	62	451	65	0.62	4.51	0.65									

GP–Games played; G–Goals; A–Assists; Pts–Points; LB–Loose balls; PIM–Penalty minutes; Pts/GP–Points per games played; LB/GP–Loose balls per games played; PIM/GP–Penalty minutes per games played.
