= David Mitchell (lacrosse) =

Canadian lacrosse player (born 1984)

Personal information
- Born: March 12, 1984 (age 42) Moose Jaw, Saskatchewan, Canada
- Height: 6 ft 0 in (183 cm)
- Weight: 195 lb (88 kg; 13 st 13 lb)

Sport
- Position: Attack
- Shoots: Left
- NLL draft: 25th overall Philadelphia Wings
- NLL team: Philadelphia Wings
- MLL teams: Chicago Machine; San Francisco Dragons; Boston Cannons
- NCAA team: Cornell University
- Pro career: 2007–

David Mitchell (born March 12, 1984, in Moose Jaw, Saskatchewan) is a Canadian lacrosse player who plays for the Philadelphia Wings in the National Lacrosse League.

== College career ==
Mitchell is a graduate of Cornell University. As a senior he was awarded with second All-American team honors, and named to the first All-Ivy League team while leading the Big Red to the 2007 NCAA Division I Men's Lacrosse Championship Final Four.

== Professional career ==
=== Major League Lacrosse ===
Mitchell was selected by the Boston Cannons as a first round selection (8th overall) in the 2007 MLL Draft Major League Lacrosse Collegiate Draft. On July 14, 2007, he netted a rookie season-high four goals against the Chicago Machine. Prior to the 2008 MLL season, Mitchell was traded to the San Francisco Dragons. He was picked up in late July 2008 by the Chicago Machine after being waived by the Dragons.

=== National Lacrosse League ===
The Philadelphia Wings drafted Mitchell in the Second Round (25th overall) in the 2007 National Lacrosse League Entry Draft.

== Statistics ==
=== MLL ===
| | | Regular Season | | | | | | | Playoffs |
| Season | Team | GP | G | 2ptG | A | Pts | LB | PIM | GP | G | 2ptG | A | Pts | LB | PIM |
|---|---|---|---|---|---|---|---|---|---|---|---|---|---|---|---|
| 2007 | Boston | 7 | 11 | 0 | 1 | 12 | 10 | 0 | -- | -- | -- | -- | -- | -- | -- |
| 2008 | San Francisco | 2 | 0 | 0 | 1 | 1 | 1 | 0.5 | -- | -- | -- | -- | -- | -- | -- |
| 2008 | Chicago | 1 | 2 | 0 | 0 | 2 | 0 | 0 | -- | -- | -- | -- | -- | -- | -- |
| MLL Totals | | 10 | 13 | 0 | 2 | 15 | 11 | 0.5 | 0 | 0 | 0 | 0 | 0 | 0 | 0 |

=== NLL ===
| | | Regular Season | | | | | | Playoffs |
| Season | Team | GP | G | A | Pts | LB | PIM | GP | G | A | Pts | LB | PIM |
|---|---|---|---|---|---|---|---|---|---|---|---|---|---|
| 2008 | Philadelphia | 6 | 5 | 1 | 6 | 26 | 0 | 0 | 0 | 0 | 0 | 0 | 0 |
| 2009 | Philadelphia | 8 | 6 | 12 | 18 | 41 | 0 | -- | -- | -- | -- | -- | -- |
| NLL totals | | 14 | 11 | 13 | 24 | 67 | 0 | 0 | 0 | 0 | 0 | 0 | 0 |

=== NCAA ===
| Season | Team | GP | G | A | Pts | GB |
|---|---|---|---|---|---|---|
| 2003 | Cornell University | 1 | 0 | 0 | 0 | 0 |
| 2005 | Cornell University | 11 | 3 | 1 | 4 | 2 |
| 2006 | Cornell University | 14 | 43 | 9 | 52 | 38 |
| 2007 | Cornell University | 16 | 47 | 9 | 56 | 53 |
| Totals | | 42 | 93 | 19 | 112 | 93 |
