= Ken Millin =

Canadian lacrosse player

Personal information
- Nationality: Canadian
- Born: January 29, 1975 (age 51) Brampton, Ontario, Canada
- Height: 5 ft 11 in (180 cm)
- Weight: 200 lb (91 kg; 14 st 4 lb)

Sport
- Position: Forward
- Shoots: Left
- NLL draft: 3rd overall, 1997; Ontario Raiders
- NLL team Former teams: Rochester Knighthawks; Toronto Rock; Ontario Raiders
- Pro career: 1998–2009

Ken Millin (born January 29, 1975) is a Canadian former indoor lacrosse player for the Rochester Knighthawks in the National Lacrosse League. He has won five NLL championships (four with the Toronto Rock and one with Rochester.

Millin currently works as a school teacher at Prince Philip Public School in St. Catharines, Ontario, and has a wife (Jennifer) and two daughters (Raiya and Kennedy).

== Statistics ==
=== NLL ===
Ken Millin		Regular season									Playoffs								
Season	Team	GP	G	A	Pts	LB	PIM	Pts/GP	LB/GP	PIM/GP	GP	G	A	Pts	LB	PIM	Pts/GP	LB/GP	PIM/GP
1998	Ontario Raiders	5	0	9	9	7	2	1.80	1.40	0.40	–	–	–	–	–	–	–	–	–
1999	Toronto Rock	5	3	2	5	18	4	1.00	3.60	0.80	–	–	–	–	–	–	–	–	–
2000	Toronto Rock	4	0	3	3	14	2	0.75	3.50	0.50	–	–	–	–	–	–	–	–	–
2001	Toronto Rock	14	7	10	17	49	12	1.21	3.50	0.86	2	0	2	2	6	0	1.00	3.00	0.00
2002	Toronto Rock	14	11	12	23	40	2	1.64	2.86	0.14	2	1	2	3	10	0	1.50	5.00	0.00
2004	Toronto Rock	14	12	15	27	48	13	1.93	3.43	0.93	1	1	2	3	7	0	3.00	7.00	0.00
2005	Rochester Knighthawks	16	8	18	26	45	6	1.63	2.81	0.38	2	1	0	1	3	0	0.50	1.50	0.00
2006	Rochester Knighthawks	11	4	12	16	20	0	1.45	1.82	0.00	2	3	0	3	8	2	1.50	4.00	1.00
2007	Rochester Knighthawks	16	19	33	52	58	4	3.25	3.63	0.25	3	0	6	6	9	0	2.00	3.00	0.00
2008	Rochester Knighthawks	15	8	25	33	49	8	2.20	3.27	0.53	–	–	–	–	–	–	–	–	–
2009	Rochester Knighthawks	14	5	11	16	41	21	1.14	2.93	1.50	1	0	0	0	2	0	0.00	2.00	0.00
		128	77	150	227	389	74	1.77	3.04	0.58	13	6	12	18	45	2	1.38	3.46	0.15
Career Total:		141	83	162	245	434	76	1.74	3.08	0.54									

GP–Games played; G–Goals; A–Assists; Pts–Points; LB–Loose balls; PIM–Penalty minutes; Pts/GP–Points per games played; LB/GP–Loose balls per games played; PIM/GP–Penalty minutes per games played.
