= Jason Crosbie =

Canadian lacrosse player

Personal information
- Nationality: Canadian
- Born: June 25, 1975 (age 50) Bowmanville, Ontario
- Height: 5 ft 11 in (180 cm)
- Weight: 314 lb (142 kg; 22 st 6 lb)

Sport
- Position: center
- Shoots: Left
- NLL draft: 24th overall, 1998; Ontario Raiders
- NLL team Former teams: Toronto Rock; Philadelphia Wings; Buffalo Bandits; Arizona Sting; Montreal Express; Rochester Knighthawks
- Pro career: 2001–

Jason Crosbie (born June 25, 1975, in Bowmanville, Ontario) is a Canadian former lacrosse player who is currently an assistant coach in the National Lacrosse League for the New York Riptide.

== NLL ==
Crosbie began his career in 2001 with the Rochester Knighthawks, then played with the Montreal Express in 2002 (where he holds the franchise record for penalty minutes - the team's only year in existence). In 2003, he was picked up by the Buffalo Bandits, where he played for three seasons before joining the Arizona Sting in 2006. The Bandits traded to re-acquire Crosbie just before the 2006 NLL trade deadline., where he played through the 2007 season.

In July 2007, Crosbie was traded to the Philadelphia Wings in a three-team blockbuster trade. In one season with Philadelphia, Crosbie set a career high in assists with forty. Prior to the 2009 NLL season, after playing nine seasons in the league, in five different cities, Crosbie signed a two-year contract with his hometown Toronto Rock as an unrestricted free agent.

During the 2009 NLL season, he was named a reserve to the All-Star game.

In the summer of 2009, Crosbie was released from the Toronto Rock and he is currently a free agent.

== Canadian Box career ==
Crosbie played with the 2006 Mann Cup champion Peterborough Lakers. Prior to playing with the Lakers, he was a member of the Brooklin Redmen from 1997 through 2004. Crosbie is also coach of the Clarington Green Gaels, alongside of Jonas Derks of the Chicago Shamrox. The Green Gaels won the 2004 Founders Cup championship of Canada's Junior "B" lacrosse leagues under Crosbie's direction . In 2007, Crosbie's Green Gaels were undefeated during the regular season in their attempt to reclaim the Cup.

== Statistics ==
=== NLL ===
| Jason Crosbie | | Regular season | | | | | | | | | Playoffs | | | | | | | | |
| Season | Team | GP | G | A | Pts | LB | PIM | Pts/GP | LB/GP | PIM/GP | GP | G | A | Pts | LB | PIM | Pts/GP | LB/GP | PIM/GP |
|---|---|---|---|---|---|---|---|---|---|---|---|---|---|---|---|---|---|---|---|
| 2001 | Rochester Knighthawks | 7 | 7 | 8 | 15 | 13 | 4 | 2.14 | 1.86 | 0.57 | – | – | – | – | – | – | – | – | – |
| 2002 | Montreal Express | 15 | 13 | 26 | 39 | 92 | 59 | 2.60 | 6.13 | 3.93 | – | – | – | – | – | – | – | – | – |
| 2003 | Buffalo Bandits | 16 | 25 | 35 | 60 | 103 | 14 | 3.75 | 6.44 | 0.88 | 2 | 3 | 9 | 12 | 6 | 7 | 6.00 | 3.00 | 3.50 |
| 2004 | Buffalo Bandits | 16 | 19 | 19 | 38 | 81 | 14 | 2.38 | 5.06 | 0.88 | 3 | 2 | 8 | 10 | 8 | 4 | 3.33 | 2.67 | 1.33 |
| 2005 | Buffalo Bandits | 14 | 20 | 30 | 50 | 69 | 10 | 3.57 | 4.93 | 0.71 | 1 | 0 | 3 | 3 | 10 | 0 | 3.00 | 10.00 | 0.00 |
| 2006 | Arizona Sting | 9 | 12 | 29 | 41 | 30 | 7 | 4.56 | 3.33 | 0.78 | – | – | – | – | – | – | – | – | – |
| 2006 | Buffalo Bandits | 7 | 6 | 8 | 14 | 26 | 6 | 2.00 | 3.71 | 0.86 | 3 | 3 | 4 | 7 | 7 | 0 | 2.33 | 2.33 | 0.00 |
| 2007 | Buffalo Bandits | 12 | 11 | 14 | 25 | 53 | 8 | 2.08 | 4.42 | 0.67 | 2 | 3 | 1 | 4 | 5 | 0 | 2.00 | 2.50 | 0.00 |
| 2008 | Philadelphia Wings | 16 | 11 | 40 | 51 | 80 | 8 | 3.19 | 5.00 | 0.50 | 1 | 0 | 3 | 3 | 4 | 0 | 3.00 | 4.00 | 0.00 |
| 2009 | Toronto Rock | 15 | 12 | 38 | 50 | 83 | 6 | 3.33 | 5.53 | 0.40 | – | – | – | – | – | – | – | – | – |
| 2010 | Philadelphia Wings | 7 | 6 | 8 | 14 | 25 | 2 | 2.00 | 3.57 | 0.29 | – | – | – | – | – | – | – | – | – |
| | | 134 | 142 | 255 | 397 | 655 | 138 | 2.96 | 4.89 | 1.03 | 12 | 11 | 28 | 39 | 40 | 11 | 3.25 | 3.33 | 0.92 |
| Career Total: | | 146 | 153 | 283 | 436 | 695 | 149 | 2.99 | 4.76 | 1.02 | | | | | | | | | |

GP–Games played; G–Goals; A–Assists; Pts–Points; LB–Loose balls; PIM–Penalty minutes; Pts/GP–Points per games played; LB/GP–Loose balls per games played; PIM/GP–Penalty minutes per games played.
