= Ryan McNish =

Retired Canadian lacrosse player

Personal information
- Nicknames: McSquish; Corporal Punishment
- Born: March 7, 1981 (age 45) Winnipeg, Manitoba, Canada
- Height: 6 ft 2 in (188 cm)
- Weight: 230 lb (100 kg; 16 st 6 lb)

Sport
- Position: Defenseman
- Shoots: Right
- NLL draft: 109th overall, 2001; Ottawa Rebel
- NLL teams: Edmonton Rush; Calgary Roughnecks
- Pro career: 2005–2012

Ryan McNish (born March 7, 1981 in Winnipeg, Manitoba) is a retired lacrosse player, in the National Lacrosse League. McNish played for the Calgary Roughnecks between the 2005 and 2008 NLL seasons before being traded to the Edmonton Rush in 2009, where he played for three seasons. McNish also served as an aviation technician with 408 Tactical Helicopter Squadron, based in CFB Edmonton.

On November 17, 2011, Ryan signed a one-year deal with the Calgary Roughnecks but was later released by the team on December 22, 2011.

In 2018 he was inducted into the Manitoba Lacrosse Hall of Fame.

== Statistics ==
=== NLL ===
		Regular Season						Playoffs
Season	Team	GP	G	A	Pts	LB	PIM	GP	G	A	Pts	LB	PIM
2005	Calgary	10	2	3	5	27	19	0	0	0	0	0	0
2006	Calgary	15	3	5	8	34	36	1	0	0	0	0	0
2007	Calgary	14	1	5	6	40	31	1	0	1	1	1	4
2008	Calgary	16	2	4	6	63	39	2	0	0	0	8	0
2009	Edmonton	15	2	2	4	35	41	--	--	--	--	--	--
2010	Edmonton	10	1	2	3	18	13	1	0	0	0	0	0
2011	Edmonton	1	0	0	0	0	0	--	--	--	--	--	--
2012	Calgary	3	0	0	0	2	17	--	--	--	--	--	--
NLL totals		84	11	21	32	219	196	5	0	1	1	9	4
