= Stephen Hoar =

Canadian lacrosse player

Personal information
- Nationality: Canadian
- Born: May 28, 1982 (age 44) Oshawa, Ontario
- Height: 6 ft 2 in (188 cm)
- Weight: 215 lb (98 kg; 15 st 5 lb)

Sport
- Position: Transition
- Shoots: right
- NLL team Former teams: Free Agent; Rochester Knighthawks; Toronto Rock
- MLL team Former teams: Free Agent; Hamilton Nationals; Rochester Rattlers
- Pro career: 2004–

Stephen Hoar (born May 28, 1982 in Oshawa, Ontario) is a Canadian professional lacrosse player formerly of the Toronto Rock in the National Lacrosse League and formerly of the Hamilton Nationals of Major League Lacrosse.

== Professional career ==
Hoar played five seasons for the Rochester Knighthawks before being traded to the Rock in September 2008. In 2007, he became the all-time Knighthawks leader for face-off wins and is the only Knighthawk to have over 600 career face-off victories. On February 5, 2014, Hoar was released by the Rock. In 2016 he signed with The New England Black Wolves for a one-year contract.

== International career ==
Hoar won a gold medal with Team Canada at the 2006 World Field Lacrosse Championships in London, Ontario.

== Statistics ==
=== NLL ===
Stephen Hoar		Regular season									Playoffs								
Season	Team	GP	G	A	Pts	LB	PIM	Pts/GP	LB/GP	PIM/GP	GP	G	A	Pts	LB	PIM	Pts/GP	LB/GP	PIM/GP
2004	Rochester Knighthawks	14	2	11	13	76	12	0.93	5.43	0.86	1	1	0	1	5	0	1.00	5.00	0.00
2005	Rochester Knighthawks	14	5	5	10	55	24	0.71	3.93	1.71	2	0	1	1	4	0	0.50	2.00	0.00
2006	Rochester Knighthawks	16	3	5	8	94	35	0.50	5.88	2.19	2	0	1	1	15	0	0.50	7.50	0.00
2007	Rochester Knighthawks	16	10	13	23	67	25	1.44	4.19	1.56	3	1	6	7	15	0	2.33	5.00	0.00
2008	Rochester Knighthawks	16	5	17	22	76	36	1.38	4.75	2.25	–	–	–	–	–	–	–	–	–
2009	Toronto Rock	16	7	7	14	69	39	0.88	4.31	2.44	–	–	–	–	–	–	–	–	–
2010	Toronto Rock	11	1	4	5	59	12	0.45	5.36	1.09	3	0	2	2	19	11	0.67	6.33	3.67
2011	Toronto Rock	16	9	8	17	90	19	1.06	5.63	1.19	3	1	1	2	10	4	0.67	3.33	1.33
2012	Toronto Rock	15	5	5	10	65	28	0.67	4.33	1.87	2	0	1	1	14	0	0.50	7.00	0.00
2013	Toronto Rock	16	1	3	4	74	12	0.25	4.63	0.75	1	0	0	0	7	0	0.00	7.00	0.00
2014	Toronto Rock	5	0	0	0	18	15	0.00	3.60	3.00	–	–	–	–	–	–	–	–	–
2014	Philadelphia Wings	8	2	5	7	21	6	0.88	2.63	0.75	–	–	–	–	–	–	–	–	–
2016	New England Black Wolves	4	1	1	2	11	4	0.50	2.75	1.00	3	1	1	2	6	0	0.67	2.00	0.00
		167	51	84	135	775	267	0.81	4.64	1.60	20	4	13	17	95	15	0.85	4.75	0.75
Career Total:		187	55	97	152	870	282	0.81	4.65	1.51									

GP–Games played; G–Goals; A–Assists; Pts–Points; LB–Loose balls; PIM–Penalty minutes; Pts/GP–Points per games played; LB/GP–Loose balls per games played; PIM/GP–Penalty minutes per games played.

=== MLL ===
		Regular Season							Playoffs
Season	Team	GP	G	2ptG	A	Pts	LB	PIM	GP	G	2ptG	A	Pts	LB	PIM
2006	Rochester	10	6	0	2	8	20	6	-	-	-	-	-	-	-
2009	Toronto	9	4	1	0	5	7	4	2	0	0	0	0	1	0.5
MLL Totals		19	10	1	2	13	27	10	2	0	0	0	0	1	0.5
