= Kurtis Wagar =

Canadian lacrosse player

Personal information
- Born: November 5, 1985 (age 40) St. Catharines, Ontario, Canada
- Height: 6 ft 0 in (183 cm)
- Weight: 215 lb (98 kg; 15 st 5 lb)

Sport
- Position: Goalie
- Shoots: Left
- NLL draft: 28th overall, 2006; Edmonton Rush
- NLL teams: Buffalo Bandits; Philadelphia Wings; Orlando Titans; New York Titans; Edmonton Rush
- Pro career: 2007–2014

Kurtis Wagar (born November 5, 1985) is a retired professional lacrosse goaltender, who spent 9 years in the National Lacrosse League. He began his amateur career with the St. Catharines Athletics of the Ontario Junior A Lacrosse League, played collegiality for the Brock Badgers, and was drafted in the third round of the 2006 NLL Entry Draft by the Edmonton Rush. Wagar spent two seasons with the Rush before he was traded along with Brenden Thenhaus to the Boston Blazers in exchange for Cam Bergman. The Blazers subsequently dealt him to the New York Titans for Anthony Kelly. He spent 2009 with the Titans, and moved with them to Orlando in 2010. When the Titans folded, he was taken in the second round of the dispersal draft by the Calgary Roughnecks, but was released before the season and signed with the Philadelphia Wings. Wagar spent two seasons with the Wings before signing with the Buffalo Bandits. He played two seasons with the Bandits before retiring in 2014.
