= National Lacrosse League Weekly Awards =

In the 1994 season, the National Lacrosse League (then called the Major Indoor Lacrosse League) began naming a Player of the Week. The first recipient was Buffalo Bandits legend John Tavares.

In 2002, the league renamed the award to Overall Player of the Week, and added weekly awards for Offensive Player of the Week, Defensive Player of the Week, and Rookie of the Week. In 2007, another new award was added, Transition Player of the Week.

== Current awards ==
Players listed in italics are retired. Number of awards is up to and including the 2008 NLL season.

=== Overall Player of the Week ===
2002-present

Player	Count
John Tavares	12
John Grant, Jr.	7
Gary Gait	6
Dan Dawson	4
Tracey Kelusky	4
Blaine Manning	4
Jim Veltman	4
Shawn Williams	4
Steve Dietrich	3
Mark Steenhuis	3
Jeff Zywicki	3

=== Offensive Player of the Week ===
2002-present

Player	Count
John Grant, Jr.	13
John Tavares	11
Shawn Williams	7
Dan Dawson	6
Colin Doyle	5
Blaine Manning	5
Pat Maddalena	4
Gary Gait	3
Paul Gait	3
Tracey Kelusky	3
Derek Malawsky	3
Jeff Ratcliffe	3
Jeff Zywicki	3

=== Defensive Player of the Week ===
2002-present

Player	Count
Dallas Eliuk	11
Pat O'Toole	10
Curtis Palidwor	9
Bob Watson	9
Steve Dietrich	8
Gee Nash	5
Nick Patterson	5
Rob Blasdell	4
Matt Roik	4
Pat Campbell	3
Matt Disher	3
Matt King	3
Dwight Maetche	3
Brandon Miller	3
Mike Miron	3

=== Rookie of the Week ===
2002-present

Player	Count
Sean Greenhalgh	5
Brodie Merrill	5
Blaine Manning	4
Craig Point	4
Ryan Benesch	3
Andrew Burkholder	3
Jordan Hall	3
Peter Morgan	3
Aaron Wilson	3

=== Transition Player of the Week ===
2007-present

Player	Count
Mark Steenhuis	9
Josh Sims	4
Steve Toll	2
Pat McCready	2
Brodie Merrill	2
Geoff Snider	2

== Previous awards ==
=== Player of the Week ===
1994-2001

Player	Count
John Tavares	8
Paul Gait	7
Gary Gait	7
Dallas Eliuk	5
Jake Bergey	4
Tom Carmean	4
Roy Colsey	4
Steve Dietrich	4
Tom Marechek	4
Pat O'Toole	4
Sal LoCascio	3

== See also ==
- National Lacrosse League Monthly Awards
- List of NLL seasons—contains the winners for each week
