= Buffalo Bandits All-time Roster =

(Every player that dressed for the Bandits in the regular season or the playoffs)

== A ==
#		Player	Position	Seasons
44	(Canada)	Mike Accursi	Forward	2000–2004, 2008–2010
45	(Canada)	Reid Acton	Defense	2018
6	(United States)	Max Adler	Transition	2022–2023
36	(Canada)	Stu Aird		1993–1995
26	(Canada)	Kevin Alexander	Forward	1992–1993
60	(Canada)	Ryan Avery	Goaltender	2006

== B ==
#		Player	Position	Seasons
15, 12		Jamie Batley		1995, 1999
4	(Canada)	Jamie Batson	Defense	2015–2016
77	(United States)	Zack Belter	Defense	2024–Present
89		Carter Bender		2013
6	(Canada)	Mike Benedict Jr.		1999
17	(Canada)	Ryan Benesch	Forward	2014–2017
15, 19	(Canada)	Matthew Bennett	Transition	2015–2019
14	(Canada)	Garrett Billings	Forward	2020
21		Jim Bissell		1992–1993
15	(Haudenosaunee)	Adam Bomberry	Defense	2023–2024
18	(Haudenosaunee)	Cam Bomberry		1999
72	(Haudenosaunee)	Cory Bomberry	Forward	2006–2009
14	(Haudenosaunee)	Tim Bomberry		1999
2	(Canada)	Troy Bonterre	Defense	2006–2007
35	(Canada)	Zak Boychuk	Goaltender	2015
32, 19	(Canada)	Dallas Bridle	Forward	2019–2020
61	(Canada)	Bryce Brochu	Forward	2017
13	(Canada)	David Brock	Transition	2013–2017
83	(United States)	Frank Brown	Transition	2020–2022, 2024
8	(Canada)	Kevin Brownell	Transition	2013–2022
33	(Canada)	Kevin Brunsch		2000
18	(Canada)	Glen Bryan	Defense	2013–2014
57	(Canada)	Doug Buchan	Goaltender	2020–2022
33	(United States)	Kevin Buchanan	Forward	2012
91	(Canada)	Kyle Buchanan	Forward	2022–Present
26	(Haudenosaunee)	Brett Bucktooth	Forward	2007–2011
27	(Canada)	Alex Buque	Goaltender	2018
12	(United States)	Mark Burnam		1992–1993
22	(Canada)	Josh Byrne	Forward	2018–2024

== C ==
#		Player	Position	Seasons
49	(Canada)	Aime Caines	Forward	2003–2005
77	(Canada)	Bill Callan		1997
25	(Canada)	Drew Candy	Defense	2004–2005
88	(Canada)	Rich Catton		2000–2001
44	(United States)	Dean Cecconi		1995–1998, 1999
22		Kyle Clancy		2010–2011
91, 34	(United States)	Chris Clark	Forward	1998–1999
7	(Canada)	Emerson Clark	Defense	2024
19	(Canada)	Jason Clark		2002, 2004
2	(Canada)	Chris Cloutier	Forward	2019–Present
9		Mark Cochrane		1994–1996
48	(Canada)	Derek Collins	Goaltender	2001
3, 33	(United States)	Roy Colsey		2002, 2004
15	(Canada)	Chris Corbeil	Defense	2010–2011
40	(Canada)	Troy Cordingley		1993–1999
13	(Canada)	Jeff Cornwall	Transition	2012
44	(Canada)	Anthony Cosmo	Goaltender	2012–2017
37	(Canada)	Nick Cotter		2013
27	(Canada)	Kyle Couling	Defense	2000–2007
1	(Canada)	Ross Cowie	Goaltender	1992–1998
19		Kevin Cox		1997
98	(Canada)	Callum Crawford	Forward	2018
91		Jordan Critch		2013
54	(Canada)	Jason Crosbie	Forward	2003–2010
12		Brian Croswell		2009
20, 19	(Canada)	Chad Culp	Forward	2011–2016

== D ==
#		Player	Position	Seasons
6	(Canada)	Paul Dawson	Defense	2024–Present
46		Paul Day		1992
12	(Canada)	Mitch de Snoo	Defense	2016–2020
25, 13	(Canada)	Jonas Derks		2002–2004, 2005
30	(Canada)	Steve Dietrich	Goaltender	2002–2007
65	(Canada)	Davide DiRuscio	Goaltender	2015–2018
1	(Canada)	Matt Disher	Goaltender	1999–2000
9	(Canada)	Neil Doddridge	Forward	1996–1997, 1999
17	(Canada)	Taylor Dooley	Defense	2025–Present
51	(Canada)	Kevin Dostie	Forward	2007–2010
21	(Canada)	Ted Dowling		1996–1997, 2001
55, 93	(Canada)	Chris Driscoll	Forward	1999–2001, 2002
19		Andy Dudun		2001
78	(Canada)	Jordan Durston	Forward	2018–2019

== E ==
#		Player	Position	Seasons
20		Gary Edmands		1996
18	(United States)	Tim Edwards	Transition	2017
37	(United States)	Tom Emmick	Forward	1992–1993
88	(Canada)	Craig England	Transition	2016–2018
15	(Canada)	Shawn Evans	Forward	2018–2019

== F ==
#		Player	Position	Seasons
5	(England)	Steve Fannell		1996–1999
53, 41	(United States)	Connor Farrell	Transition	2024–Present
21	(Canada)	Tyler Ferreira	Transition	2016
5	(United States)	Connor Fields	Forward	2022
23	(Canada)	Bob Fisher		1999
26		Greg Floris	Defense	2004–2005
81	(Canada)	Ryan Fournier	Defense	2018
91		Corey Fowler		2015
19		Tyler Francey		2005
84	(Haudenosaunee)	Brandon Francis	Forward	2008–2012
95	(Canada)	Chase Fraser	Forward	2018–Present
18		Randy Fraser		2002–2004

== G ==
#		Player	Position	Seasons
26	(Canada)	Craig Gelsvik	Forward	2002–2003
85	(Canada)	Derek General	Goaltender	2004–2005
6		Miles General		1993
39		Bill Gerrie	Goaltender	1992–1995
91, 19	(Canada)	Darryl Gibson	Defense	2010–2012
27	(Canada)	Mat Giles	Forward	2012–2013
81	(Canada)	Matt Gilray	Defense	2019–2020
55	(Haudenosaunee)	Angus Goodleaf	Goaltender	2009–2012
71	(Canada)	Brandon Goodwin	Transition	2015
89	(Canada)	Derek Graham		1998
19	(Canada)	Sean Greenhalgh	Forward	2009–2010
2	(Canada)	Ray Guze	Defense	2003

== H ==
#		Player	Position	Seasons
55	(Canada)	Jamie Hackel		2001–2003
17		Brian Hall		1992–1997
28		Bob Hamley	Forward	1992–1995
7	(Canada)	Jon Harasym	Forward	2005–2006
21		Jeff Hardill		1994
39, 33	(Canada)	Jon Harnett	Defense	2019–2020
28	(Haudenosaunee)	Vaughn Harris	Forward	2018
10	(Canada)	Mike Hasen		1996–1999
7	(United States)	Tony Henderson		2007
88	(United States)	Jason Henhawk		1998
18		Donald Henry		1997
33, 9		Robert Henry		1993–1999, 2002
71	(Canada)	Zach Herreweyers	Forward	2018–2019
33, 65	(Canada)	Zach Higgins	Goalie	2018–2019
88, 96	(Canada)	Cory Highfield	Transition	2024
66	(Haudenosaunee)	Alexander-Kedoh Hill	Transition	2013, 2015–2017
5, 28	(Haudenosaunee)	Clay Hill	Defense	2005–2011
6		Gerry Hiltz		1992
66		Scott Hochstadt		2000
14, 91	(Canada)	Thomas Hoggarth	Forward	2018–2019
8		Sean Holmes		2001
90, 28	(Canada)	Mike Hominuck	Forward	2004–2005, 2013
20	(Canada)	Derek Hopcroft	Forward	2013
15	(Canada)	Kevin Howard		2002

== I ==
#		Player	Position	Seasons
88	(Canada)	Travis Irving	Defense	2011–2012

== J ==
#		Player	Position	Seasons
88		Cody Jacobs		2009
34	(Canada)	Duane Jacobs		2003
14		Kyle Jamieson	Forward	2005
33	(Haudenosaunee)	Ron John	Transition	2025–Present
10		Grant Johnston		1995
71	(Haudenosaunee)	Brier Jonathan	Defense	2017
24	(Canada)	Mitch Jones	Forward	2014–2018
46		Carl Jutzin		1993

== K ==
#		Player	Position	Seasons
97	(Canada)	Bryan Kazarian	Forward	2004–2006
13	(Canada)	JP Kealey	Forward	2020
45	(Canada)	Derek Keenan		1992–1993
17	(Canada)	Tracey Kelusky	Forward	2011–2013
13		William Kerr		1992–1993
35, 43	(United States)	Darris Kilgour		1992–1999
33, 16	(United States)	Rich Kilgour	Transition	1992–2009
22	(United States)	Travis Kilgour		1995–2000
6	(Canada)	Rob Kirkby		2001–2002
44		Steve Kisslinger		1999
56, 38		Scott Komer	Goaltender	2001, 2013
44	(Canada)	Nathaniel Kozevnikov	Forward	2023
20	(Canada)	Rusty Kruger	Forward	2008

== L ==
#		Player	Position	Seasons
13	(Canada)	Marc Landriault		2002
32	(Canada)	Chris Langdale	Defense	2002–2006
14		Jon Lantzy		1993
12	(Canada)	Sam La Roue	Forward	2021–2025
7		Derek Laub		1994–1995
17	(Canada)	Kyle Laverty	Defense	2004–2008
5		Glen Lay		1993–1994
4	(Haudenosaunee)	Andrew Lazore	Forward	2008
52	(Canada)	Kellen LeClair	Defense	2023
49	(Canada)	Tyson Leies		1994
77, 33	(Canada)	Chris Levis	Goaltender	1998, 2002
41, 51	(Canada)	Dan Lintner	Forward	2020
20, 2	(Canada)	Ian Llord	Defense	2008–2012
4		Mario Lopez		2000
24		Jason Luke		1996–1998

== M ==
#		Player	Position	Seasons
4	(Canada)	Ian MacKay	Transition	2019–Present
42		Pat Maddalena	Forward	2002
18	(Canada)	Derek Malawsky		2000–2001
93	(Canada)	Tony Malcom	Forward	2016–2017
21	(Canada)	Justin Martin	Defense	2017–Present
24	(Canada)	Kiel Matisz	Transition	2025–Present
23, 10	(Canada)	Pat McCready	Transition	2002–2009
10	(Canada)	Brad McCulley	Forward	2022–2024
0	(Canada)	Ben McCullough	Defense	2011
2		Ryan McDermott		1999-2000
29	(Canada)	Carter McKenzie	Defense	2023–2024
10, 14	(Canada)	Mike McNamara	Defense	2012–2013
22, 9		Bill Meagher		1992–1994
18, 36	(Canada)	Randy Mearns		1993, 2002
49	(Canada)	Marcus Minichiello	Defense	2020–2023
29	(Haudenosaunee)	Ken Montour	Goaltender	2002, 2006, 2008–2010
63	(Haudenosaunee)	Tom Montour	Transition	2004–2005, 2009–2012
40, 98		Mike Mooradian		1992, 1999
10	(Canada)	Darren Mutch		2004

== N ==
#		Player	Position	Seasons
1	(Haudenosaunee)	Tehoka Nanticoke	Forward	2022–Present
18	(Canada)	Lukas Nielsen	Forward	2025–Present
12	(Canada)	Brian Nikula		1994
15, 26	(Canada)	Brent Noseworthy	Defense	2020–2022

== O ==
#		Player	Position	Seasons
96	(Haudenosaunee)	Bill O'Brien	Defense	2018
37	(Canada)	Ethan O'Connor	Transition	2019–2023
19, 10, 20	(Canada)	Andy Ogilvie	Defense	1999–2004
16		Bill O'Hanlon		1992
48	(Canada)	Marty O'Neill	Goaltender	1999–2000
44	(Canada)	Steven Orleman	Goaltender	2024–Present
31	(Canada)	Pat O'Toole	Goaltender	1996–1998

== P ==
#		Player	Position	Seasons
53	(United States)	Chris Panos		1999
15	(Canada)	Peter Parke		1997
37	(Canada)	Liam Patten	Defense	2018
56	(Canada)	Drew Petkoff	Defense	2013
4	(Canada)	Tom Phair		1996–1998
77		Brandon Piccaretto		2001
12	(Canada)	Lindsey Plunkett		2003, 2006
49	(Haudenosaunee)	Craig Point	Forward	2017
22	(United States)	Ryan Powell		2001–2002, 2004
15	(United States)	Barry Powless		1992
99, 8	(Haudenosaunee)	Delby Powless	Forward	2005–2010
6	(Haudenosaunee)	Neal Powless		2004
77	(Haudenosaunee)	Quinn Powless	Forward	2020
7	(Canada)	Chris Prat		2000
23	(Canada)	Steve Priolo	Defense	2010–Present
98	(Canada)	Jimmy Purves	Defense	2011–2013

== Q ==
#		Player	Position	Seasons
31	(Canada)	Corey Quinn	Goaltender	2003–2004

== R ==
#		Player	Position	Seasons
49		Chris Redwood		1995
19	(Canada)	Zac Reid	Defense	2018
5	(United States)	Frank Resetarits	Forward	2010–2012
5	(United States)	Joe Resetarits	Forward	2014–2015
10	(United States)	Blaze Riorden	Forward	2017
73	(Canada)	Brandon Robinson	Forward	2023–2024
8	(Canada)	Dylan Robinson	Defense	2023–Present
53	(Canada)	Justin Robinson	Defense	2022–2024
90	(Canada)	Jamie Rooney	Forward	2013–2014
13	(Canada)	John Rosa		1995, 1998–1999
33	(United States)	Brent Rothfuss	Transition	1999

== S ==
#		Player	Position	Seasons
86	(Canada)	Daniel Sams	Goaltender	2007–2008
18	(Canada)	Phil Sanderson	Defense	2007–2009
3, 94	(Canada)	Ryan Sanderson		1997–1998
20	(Canada)	Shaydon Santos		1998–2000
14	(Canada)	Pat Saunders	Forward	2017–2018
81	(Haudenosaunee)	Clay Scanlan	Forward	2025–Present
12, 24	(United States)	Kyle Schmelzle	Defense	2006, 2008–2010
4	(Canada)	Ethan Schott	Defense	2018
25	(Canada)	Brad Self	Transition	2017
56, 4	(Canada)	Scott Self		2001, 2011-2013
24	(Canada)	Chris Seller	Transition	2000–2003
21	(Haudenosaunee)	Daryl Seymour	Defense	2007
30	(Canada)	Devlin Shanahan	Goaltender	2020–2024
8	(Canada)	A.J. Shannon	Forward	2004–2006, 2010
77	(Canada)	Jeff Shattler	Transition	2006
44		Andy Shaughnessy		1994
4	(United States)	Brian Silcott		1994, 1999
45, 15	(Canada)	Corey Small	Forward	2019–2020
3	(Canada)	Billy Dee Smith	Defense	2003–2017
92	(Canada)	Dhane Smith	Forward	2013–Present
97	(Canada)	Hayden Smith	Transition	2013
14	(United States)	Joe Smith	Defense	2008–2010
42	(Canada)	Rory Smith	Defense	2014
22	(United States)	Tony Sorci		2007
25	(Canada)	Matt Spanger	Defense	2019–Present
5, 28	(Haudenosaunee)	Clay Squire	Defense	1998
92	(Canada)	Dallas Squire		1998
93	(Canada)	Kim Squire	Forward	2006
34	(Haudenosaunee)	Rodd Squire		1995
9	(Canada)	Mark Steenhuis	Transition	2003–2018
24	(Canada)	Matt Steinwald		1999
8	(Canada)	Craig Stevenson		1999–2000
17	(Canada)	Jordan Stouros	Transition	2022
6, 7	(Canada)	Derek Suddons	Defense	2013–2015
19	(Canada)	Kelly Sullivan		2003
27	(United States)	Dalton Sulver	Transition	2022–2024
84	(Canada)	Kerry Susheski		2003–2004
12, 17	(Haudenosaunee)	Brandon Swamp	Forward	2008–2009
38	(United States)	Dave Sweeney	Transition	1992, 1993
71, 77	(United States)	Kyle Sweeney	Transition	2012
17		D'Arcy Sweet		2000–2001
7, 94	(Canada)	Bryce Sweeting	Defense	2019-Present

== T ==
#		Player	Position	Seasons
11	(Canada)	John Tavares	Forward	1992–2015
47	(Canada)	Peter Tavares		2003
4, 70	(Canada)	Joel Tayler	Defense	2014, 2023
15	(Canada)	Dan Teat	Forward	2005–2008
19	(Canada)	Brenden Thenhaus	Forward	2007, 2011
74	(Haudenosaunee)	Jeremy Thompson	Transition	2012
2	(Haudenosaunee)	Jerome Thompson	Forward	2015–2016
66	(Haudenosaunee)	Michael Thompson	Goaltender	2007–2012
75	(Canada)	Jay Thorimbert	Transition	2011–2016
42	(Canada)	Nick Trudeau		1998

== V ==
#		Player	Position	Seasons
61	(Canada)	Thomas Vaesen	Forward	2023
36	(Canada)	Daryl Veltman	Forward	2016–2017
32	(Canada)	Jim Veltman		1992–1996
28	(Canada)	Jim Vilneff		1999
48	(Canada)	Matt Vinc	Goaltender	2019–2026
81	(Haudenosaunee)	Roger Vyse	Forward	2006–2012

== W ==
#		Player	Position	Seasons
38	(Canada)	Kurtis Wagar	Goaltender	2013–2015
94	(Canada)	Ryan Wagner	Defense	2018–2019
14	(Canada)	Shane Wannamaker		2000
39		Bill Warder		2001
22	(Canada)	Andrew Watt	Defense	2014–2017
24	(Canada)	Christian Watts	Forward	2024
20	(Canada)	Nick Weiss	Transition	2015–Present
90	(Canada)	Phil Wetherup	Goaltender	2001
6	(Canada)	Chris White	Defense	2005–2012
3	(Canada)	Thomas Whitty	Transition	2025–Present
55	(Canada)	Mitch Wilde	Defense	2014–2017
15	(Canada)	Luke Wiles	Forward	2012–2013
5	(Canada)	Adam Will	Defense	2016–2017
51	(Canada)	Shawn Williams		2000–2001, 2013-2014
10	(Canada)	Aaron Wilson	Forward	2013–2014
5	(Canada)	Cam Wyers	Defense	2024–Present

== Z ==
#		Player	Position	Seasons
12	(Canada)	Casey Zaph	Forward	1998
14	(United States)	John Zulberti	Forward	1992
