= Rochester Knighthawks all-time roster =

Here is the roster of everyone who has played on the Rochester Knighthawks of the National Lacrosse League, or who was placed just on the practice squad, including the player's number, position, nationality, and years with the team.

No.		Position	Player
43	(Haudenosaunee)	Def	Marshall Abrams 2002-08
44	(Canada)	Fwd	Mike Accursi 2005-07
4	(Canada)	Def	Yul Baker 1997
66	(Haudenosaunee)	Def	Mike Benedict 1995-97
77		Def	Jim Blanding 1996
18	(Haudenosaunee)	Fwd	Cam Bomberry 1996-99
72	(Haudenosaunee)	Fwd	Cory Bomberry 1997-03
26	(Canada)	Trans	David Brown 2006-08
77	(Canada)	Def	Tim Burke 2002-03
37	(Canada)	Fwd	Andrew Burkholder 2006
23	(Haudenosaunee)	Def	Mark Burnam 1995
88	(United States)	Fwd	Gerry Byrne 1997
37	(Canada)	Goalie	Pat Campbell 2002-05
25	(United States)	Fwd	Eric Carlsen 2001-02
45	(United States)	Fwd	Tom Carmean 1999
44	(Canada)	Def	Dean Cecconi 1999
5	(Canada)	Def	Sandy Chapman 2006-08
2	(United States)	Def	Greg Clements 1995
44	(Canada)	Goalie	Derek Collins 1996
3	(United States)	Fwd	Roy Colsey 1996
40	(Canada)	Def	Troy Cordingley 2001
28/42	(United States)	Def	Pat Cougevan 1996, 1998-08
92		Def	Kevin Cox 1998
54	(Canada)	Fwd	Jason Crosbie 2000-01
12	(Canada)	Def	Brian Croswell 2005-07
52/41	(Canada)	Goalie	Grant Crawley 2006-08
13	(Canada)	Fwd	Kevin Dance 1998-99
31/30	(Canada)	Goalie	Steve Dietrich 1995-01
25	(United States)	Def	Scott Ditzell 2006-08
4	(Canada)	Fwd	Ted Dowling 1998-99
93	(Canada)	Fwd	Chris Driscoll 1995–99, 2010–11
7	(United States)	Def	Pat Dutton 2005-07
37		Def	Tom Emmick 1995-98
19	(Canada)	Fwd	Scott Evans 2004-08
15	(Canada)	Fwd	Shawn Evans 2006-08
9	(United States)	Def	Mark Fietta 1996-97
17		Fwd	Bobby Fisher 1998-99
36	(Canada)	Trans	Luke Forget 2007-08
19	(Canada)	Fwd	Paul Gait 1995-97
1	(Haudenosaunee)	Goalie	Derek General 1996-99
39	(Canada)	Goalie	Bill Gerrie 1998
15	(Canada)	Fwd	Mat Giles 2004-05
24	(Canada)	Fwd	John Grant 2000-08
21/20	(Canada)	Def	Billy Greer 2006-08
9	(Canada)	Fwd	Jon Harasym 2004
10	(Canada)	Def	Mike Hasen 1999-07
88	(Canada)	Def	Tom Hawke 1995
29	(Canada)	Goalie	Clayton Henry 1995
23	(Canada)	Trans	Stephen Hoar 2004-08
16	(United States)	Fwd	Jeremy Hollenbeck 1995-04
94	(United States)	Fwd	Ben Hunt 2000-02
34	(Haudenosaunee)	Fwd	Duane Jacobs 1995-02
19	(Canada)	Fwd	Ted Jenner 2002-03
14	(Canada)	Def	Steve Jennings 2003-04
3/9	(Australia)	Def	Dennis Juleff 2004-05

No.		Position	Player
2	(United States)	Def	Matt Kerwick 1996
43	(Haudenosaunee)	Def	Darris Kilgour 1999
20	(Canada)	Fwd	Rusty Kruger 1998-01
7	(Canada)	Def	Brian Lemon 1995-96
4	(Canada)	Def	Carter Livingstone 2005-06
23		Def	Charlie Lockwood 1997
21	(Canada)	Fwd	Matt Lyons 2008
14		Def	Rex Lyons 1995-96
32	(Canada)	Def	Brad MacArthur 1999-01
14	(Canada)	Fwd	Mat MacLeod 2008
22	(Canada)	Fwd	Curt Malawsky 1998-03
18	(Canada)	Fwd	Derek Malawsky 2002-04
10/23	(Canada)	Trans	Pat McCready 1997-01
24		Def	Bill Meagher 1995
36	(Canada)	Fwd	Randy Mearns 1995-01
32	(Canada)	Def	Ken Millin 2005-08
9	(United States)	Trans	Blake Miller 2006
41	(Canada)	Goalie	Mike Miron 2007
15	(Canada)	Def	Darren Mutch 2001
77	(Canada)	Fwd	Tim O’Brien 2000
14	(Canada)	Fwd	Ryan O'Connor 2004-06
39	(Canada)	Goalie	Pat O'Toole 1999-08
15	(Canada)	Def	Peter Parke 1995-96
20	(Canada)	Def	Steve Penny 2003-06
16	(Canada)	Fwd	Andrew Potter 2008
99	(United States)	Fwd	Casey Powell 1999-00
8	(Haudenosaunee)	Fwd	Neal Powless 1997
18	(United States)	Def	Jack Reid 2007-08
5	(United States)	Def	Matt Riter 1995-98
5	(Canada)	Def	Brock Robertson 2004
2	(United States)	Trans	Brent Rothfuss 1998-99
19	(Canada)	Fwd	Josh Sanderson 1998-99
20	(Canada)	Def	Shaydon Santos 1997
2	(United States)	Trans	Chris Schiller 2002-08
96/3	(United States)	Def	Charlie Shoulberg 1998-99
4	(United States)	Def	Brian Silcott 1995-96
33	(United States)	Def	Tim Soudan 1995-05
21	(Haudenosaunee)	Def	Dallas Squire 1995
93	(Haudenosaunee)	Def	Kim Squire 2004
29	(Canada)	Def	Buck Stobart 2004
17	(Canada)	Fwd	D'Arcy Sweet 2002-03
18	(United States)	Def	Jeff Tambroni 1995
12	(Canada)	Def	Rodney Tapp 2002
28	(Canada)	Fwd	Jamie Taylor 2004
15	(Canada)	Fwd	Daniel Teat 1997-00
11	(United States)	Def	Regy Thorpe 1995-08
17	(Canada)	Trans	Steve Toll 2005-08
26	(Canada)	Def	Andrew Turner 2000-05
9	(Canada)	Fwd	Cory Vitarelli 2008
93	(United States)	Fwd	Bill Warder 2003
90	(Canada)	Goalie	Phil Wetherup 2007-08
88	(United States)	Def	Jeff Wilfong 1998
23/21	(Canada)	Def	Shawn Wilkins 2003, 2007–08
51	(Canada)	Fwd	Shawn Williams 2002-08
27	(Canada)	Def	Casey Zaph 2000-05
22	(Canada)	Fwd	Gary Gait 2009-11

== Practice squad ==
No.		Position	Player
28	(Canada)	Fwd	Kyle Arbuckle 2004
35	(Canada)	Goalie	Ryan Avery 2003
21	(United States)	Def	Solomon Bliss 2004
4	(United States)	Fwd	Tim Booth 2004
25	(Canada)	Def	Dan Bowman 2003
12	(United States)	Def	Jamie Breslin 2002
6	(Haudenosaunee)	Fwd	Drew Bucktooth 2008
1	(United States)	Goalie	Jake Coon 2001-02
17		Def	Anthony Gray 1995
12	(Canada)	Fwd	Sean Howe 2001
18	(Canada)	Fwd	Marc Landriault 2001
1	(Canada)	Goalie	Josh McNaughton 2005
0		Def	Peter Paul 1997

No.		Position	Player
30	(Canada)	Goalie	Ryan Phillips 2002
5	(United States)	Fwd	David Pittard 2005
1	(Canada)	Goalie	Corey Quinn 2000-01
3	(United States)	Fwd	T.J. Rogers 2005
92	(Canada)	Def	Phil Sanderson 1999
44	(United States)	Fwd	Billy Serino 2003
3	(United States)	Def	Joe Smith 2007
6	(United States)	Def	Andrew Spack 2008
22	(United States)	Fwd	Brandon Spillett 2008
13	(Canada)	Def	Chris Stewart 2006
22	(Canada)	Def	Mike Temple 2006
17	(United States)	Fwd	Andrew Whipple 2001
19	(United States)	Fwd	Craig Whipple 2001-02
