= Heritage Cup (box lacrosse) =

The Heritage Cup is an international box lacrosse tournament between the national teams of Canada, Iroquois and United States. The games feature mostly players that were members of National Lacrosse League teams.

== 2002 Heritage Cup ==
The inaugural Heritage Cup was played on October 2, 2002 at the Hershey Centre in Mississauga, Ontario, and featured Team USA against Team Canada. Team USA won the game 21-16.

=== Rosters ===
UNITED STATES

Name	Pos	NLL team
Jake Bergey	F	Philadelphia
Richard Brzeski	D	Philadelphia
Roy Colsey	F	New Jersey
Hugh Donovan	D	Colorado
Kevin Finneran	F	Philadelphia
Jamie Hanford	D	New Jersey
Peter Jacobs	D	Philadelphia
Jay Jalbert	D	Philadelphia
Dwight Maetche	G	Vancouver
Pat McCabe	D	New York
Erik Miller	G	Colorado
Mark Millon	F	Philadelphia
Chris Panos	F	Calgary
Brian Reese	D	Colorado
Mike Regan	F	Albany
Tom Ryan	F	Philadelphia
Tom Slate	D	Philadelphia
Dave Stilley	D	Philadelphia
Tim Soudan	F	Rochester
Regy Thorpe	D	Rochester

Head Coaches: Darris Kilgour (Buffalo), Tony Resch (Philadelphia)

CANADA

Name	Pos	NLL team
Rob Blasdell	G	Albany
Glenn Clark	D	Toronto
Anthony Cosmo	G	Toronto
Pat Coyle	D	Toronto
Colin Doyle	F	Toronto
Gary Gait	F	Colorado
John Grant Jr.	F	Rochester
Tracey Kelusky	F	Montreal
Curt Malawsky	F	Rochester
Blaine Manning	F	Toronto
Jim Moss	D	Albany
Gavin Prout	F	New York
Josh Sanderson	F	Albany
Dan Stroup	F	Toronto
Dan Teat	F	Albany
Steve Toll	F	Toronto
John Tavares	F	Buffalo
Jim Veltman	F	Toronto
Bob Watson	G	Toronto
Cam Woods	D	Albany

Head Coach: Les Bartley (Toronto)

== 2004 Heritage Cup ==
The 2004 Heritage Cup was held at the Pepsi Center in Denver, Colorado on October 16, 2004. The game once again featured Team USA against Team Canada, but this time Team Canada came out on top, winning 17-8.

=== Rosters ===
UNITED STATES

#	Name	Pos	Sh	Age	NLL team	Ht.	Wt.
1	Dwight Maetche	G	R	41	Vancouver	6'0"	195
2	Erik Miller	G	R	33	Colorado	6'5"	235
4	Josh Sims	F	L	26	Colorado	6'2"	200
5	Jamie Hanford	D	R	29	Colorado	6'2"	215
6	Brian Langtry	F	R	28	Colorado	5'11"	180
9	Keith Cromwell	F	L	25	Philadelphia	6'1"	195
10	Jay Jalbert	D	R	27	Colorado	6'2"	210
71	Regy Thorpe	D	R	33	Rochester	6'1"	240
11	Kevin Finneran	F	L	37	None	6'2"	200
13	John Rosa	D	L	34	Anaheim	6'2"	213
15	Jeff Sonke	D	L	25	Colorado	6'2"	200
20	Scott Stapleford	D	L	23	Colorado	6'0"	185
21	Mike Regan	F	R	26	San Jose	5'10"	190
22	Ryan Powell	F	R	26	Anaheim	6'1"	195
27	Dan Marohl	F	R	26	Philadelphia	6'1"	190
32	Shawn Nadelen	D	L	25	Philadelphia	6'0"	200
34	Brian Reese	D	R	28	Colorado	6'3"	210
41	Nicky Polanco	D	R	24	None	6'4"	215
55	Chris Panos	F	L	30	Anaheim	6'0"	195
77	Dave Stilley	D	R	30	Colorado	6'2"	220

Head Coach: Tony Resch
Assistant Coach: Jamie Batley
Assistant Coach: Jimmy Rogers
General Manager: Steve Govett

CANADA

#	Name	Pos	Sh	Age	NLL team	Ht.	Wt.
6	Dan Dawson	F	R	23	Arizona	6'5"	225
7	Colin Doyle	F	L	27	Toronto	6'3"	215
9	Kaleb Toth	F	R	27	Calgary	6'0"	190
10	Gavin Prout	F	R	26	Colorado	5'10"	185
11	John Tavares	F	L	36	Buffalo	5'11"	175
15	Rob Kirkby	D	R	25	Calgary	6'3"	200
16	Blaine Manning	F	R	25	Toronto	6'1"	205
17	Steve Toll	F	R	30	San Jose	6'0"	187
22	Gary Gait	F	L	37	Colorado	6'2"	210
23	Cam Woods	D	R	28	San Jose	6'3"	205
24	John Grant Jr.	F	R	29	Rochester	6'2"	224
27	Peter Lough	F	R	29	Arizona	6'2"	210
32	Jim Veltman	F	L	38	Toronto	6'2"	185
38	Gee Nash	G	L	26	Colorado	6'0"	190
39	Pat O'Toole	G	R	33	Rochester	6'0"	215
40	Ian Rubel	D	L	26	Toronto	6'0"	200
44	Anthony Cosmo	G	L	27	Toronto	6'2"	205
45	Taylor Wray	D	R	23	Calgary	6'2"	225
55	Jim Moss	D	R	27	San Jose	6'0"	180
71	Tracey Kelusky	F	R	29	Calgary	5'10"	180

Head Coach: Les Bartley
Assistant Coach: Walt Christianson
Assistant Coach: Ed Comeau
Assistant Coach: Bob McMahon
General Manager: Johnny Mouradian

== Results ==
Year	Location	Winning team	Score	Losing team
2002	Canada (Mississauga, Ontario)	United States	21-16	Canada
2004	United States (Denver, Colorado)	Canada	17-8	United States
2013	Canada (Montreal, Quebec)	Canada	12-11	Haudenosaunee
2017	Canada (Hamilton, Ontario)	Canada	19-6	United States
2023	United States (Philadelphia, Pennsylvania)			
