= 2007 NLL season =

- League: National Lacrosse League
- Sport: Indoor lacrosse
- Duration: December 30, 2006 – May 12, 2007
- Games: 16
- Teams: 13

Regular season
- Season MVP: John Grant, Jr. (Rochester Knighthawks)
- Top scorer: John Grant, Jr. (Rochester Knighthawks)

Playoffs
- Eastern champions: Rochester Knighthawks
- Eastern runners-up: Buffalo Bandits
- Western champions: Colorado Mammoth
- Western runners-up: Calgary Roughnecks

Champion's Cup
- Champions: Rochester Knighthawks (2nd title)
- Runners-up: Arizona Sting
- Finals MVP: John Grant, Jr. (Rochester)

NLL seasons
- ← 2006 season 2008 season →

The 2007 National Lacrosse League season, the 21st in the history of the NLL (including the Eagle Pro Box Lacrosse League and Major Indoor Lacrosse League years) began on December 30, 2006 and concluded with the championship game on May 12, 2007.

The Rochester Knighthawks finished the regular season with a 14–2 record, winning their last 12 games. They followed this up by beating Toronto in the first round, and then clinched the Eastern division title by defeating Buffalo in the Eastern division finals, with league MVP John Grant, Jr. scoring in overtime.

The Arizona Sting finished third in their division, but defeated the Calgary Roughnecks in the first round, and then beat the San Jose Stealth to clinch their second division title in three years. The championship game was awarded to Rochester because of their higher seed, but the Blue Cross Arena was unavailable on the day of the game, so the Championship game was held in Phoenix.

The Knighthawks continued their winning streak in the desert, defeating the Sting 13–11. John Grant, Jr., who had been named the league MVP only two days before, was named game MVP. It was Rochester's second championship overall, and first since 1997. The championship game loss was Arizona's second in three years.

The season began with a blockbuster trade just three days before the first game, as the Toronto Rock traded star forward and 2005 MVP Colin Doyle along with Darren Halls and a draft pick to the San Jose Stealth for 1st round draft selection Ryan Benesch, Kevin Fines, Chad Thompson, and two draft picks. Doyle scored nine assists in San Jose's second game of the season, a 17–16 OT win over the Calgary Roughnecks, and finished the season second in team scoring. Benesch was named 2007 Rookie of the Year.

In February, the NLL signed an agreement with Sirius Satellite Radio to air a "Game of the Week" throughout the season as well as during the playoffs. In March, the league announced that New York Titans star Casey Powell would be hosting a weekly radio show on SIRIUS, called Inside the National Lacrosse League with Casey Powell.

== Teams ==
2007 National Lacrosse League
Division	Team	City	Arena	Capacity
East	Buffalo Bandits	Buffalo, New York	HSBC Arena	18,690
East	Chicago Shamrox	Hoffman Estates, Illinois	Sears Centre Arena	9,500
East	Minnesota Swarm	Saint Paul, Minnesota	XCEL Energy Center	18,064
East	New York Titans	New York, New York	Madison Square Garden; Nassau Veterans Memorial Coliseum	18,200; 16,234
East	Philadelphia Wings	Philadelphia, Pennsylvania	Wachovia Center	19,523
East	Rochester Knighthawks	Rochester, New York	Blue Cross Arena	10,662
East	Toronto Rock	Toronto, Ontario	Air Canada Centre	18,800
West	Arizona Sting	Glendale, Arizona	Jobing.com Arena	17,125
West	Calgary Roughnecks	Calgary, Alberta	Pengrowth Saddledome	19,289
West	Colorado Mammoth	Denver, Colorado	Pepsi Center	18,007
West	Edmonton Rush	Edmonton, Alberta	Rexall Place	16,839
West	Portland Lumberjax	Portland, Oregon	Rose Garden	18,280
West	San Jose Stealth	San Jose, California	HP Pavilion	17,496

=== Map of teams ===
East Division West Division

== Final standings ==
East Division
P	Team	GP	W	L	PCT	GB	Home	Road	GF	GA	Diff	GF/GP	GA/GP
1	Rochester Knighthawks – xyz	16	14	2	.875	0.0	8–0	6–2	249	194	+55	15.56	12.12
2	Buffalo Bandits – x	16	10	6	.625	4.0	6–2	4–4	207	188	+19	12.94	11.75
3	Minnesota Swarm – x	16	9	7	.562	5.0	4–4	5–3	200	207	−7	12.50	12.94
4	Toronto Rock – x	16	6	10	.375	8.0	3–5	3–5	187	183	+4	11.69	11.44
5	Chicago Shamrox	16	6	10	.375	8.0	4–4	2–6	176	191	−15	11.00	11.94
6	Philadelphia Wings	16	6	10	.375	8.0	4–4	2–6	178	186	−8	11.12	11.62
7	New York Titans	16	4	12	.250	10.0	3–5	1–7	195	233	−38	12.19	14.56

West Division
P	Team	GP	W	L	PCT	GB	Home	Road	GF	GA	Diff	GF/GP	GA/GP
1	Colorado Mammoth – xy	16	12	4	.750	0.0	7–1	5–3	209	179	+30	13.06	11.19
2	Calgary Roughnecks – x	16	9	7	.562	3.0	4–4	5–3	219	202	+17	13.69	12.62
3	Arizona Sting – x	16	9	7	.562	3.0	6–2	3–5	188	181	+7	11.75	11.31
4	San Jose Stealth – x	16	9	7	.562	3.0	4–4	5–3	181	170	+11	11.31	10.62
5	Edmonton Rush	16	6	10	.375	6.0	4–4	2–6	160	189	−29	10.00	11.81
6	Portland LumberJax	16	4	12	.250	8.0	3–5	1–7	153	199	−46	9.56	12.44

x: Clinched playoff berth; c: Clinched playoff berth by crossing over to another division; y: Clinched division; z: Clinched best regular season record; GP: Games Played
W: Wins; L: Losses; GB: Games back; PCT: Win percentage; Home: Record at Home; Road: Record on the Road; GF: Goals scored; GA: Goals allowed
Differential: Difference between goals scored and allowed; GF/GP: Average number of goals scored per game; GA/GP: Average number of goals allowed per game

Toronto won the 3-way tiebreaker with Philadelphia and Chicago due to their 5–7 record against divisional opponents (Philadelphia was 4–8, and Chicago was 5–8).
Calgary won the 3-way tiebreaker with Arizona and San Jose because of their head-to-head record (Calgary was 2–1 against Arizona and 1–1 against San Jose, while San Jose went 0–2 against Arizona).

=== Playoffs ===
Divisional Semifinal
1	Rochester	10
4	Toronto	6
Eastern Division
2	Buffalo	14
3	Minnesota	8
1	Colorado	14
4	San Jose	15 (OT)
Western Division
2	Calgary	9
3	Arizona	13

Divisional Final
1	Rochester	14 (OT)
2	Buffalo	13
3	Arizona	9
4	San Jose	7

Champion's Cup Final
E1	Rochester	13
W3	Arizona	11

The Knighthawks had the overall top seed in the playoffs, but were unable to host the Championship game due to a scheduling conflict at the Blue Cross Arena.

== Team movement ==
The 2007 season features two new expansion teams, both in the East Division: the Chicago Shamrox and the New York Titans.

== Rule changes ==
A number of rule changes were made for the 2007 season. The main changes are:

- Cross-checks to the head are more severely punished
- Cross-checking a player without the ball is now illegal
- Scoring from behind the net is now allowed, provided there is no contact between the ball and the goalie or his equipment (this effectively allows the "Air Gait" move invented by Gary Gait)
- When a penalty shot is awarded, the coach can choose any player on the team to take the shot

== Milestones ==
- January 6:
  - Chicago and New York played their first ever games
  - Chicago recorded its first win and first home win
  - New York's first goal was scored by Gewas Schindler
  - Chicago's first goal was scored by Jason Clark
  - Edmonton won its first ever home game, defeating the Philadelphia Wings 13–12
- January 12: San Jose beat Calgary 17–16 in overtime in the longest game in NLL history. The game lasted 71 minutes and 42 seconds before Luke Wiles scored at 11:42 of overtime, narrowly beating the old record of 70:45 during an Arizona-Anaheim game in 2004.
- January 20: New York records its first win and first home win at Madison Square Garden with an 11–9 victory over the Chicago Shamrox. The game is also the first loss for the Shamrox.
- January 26: New York plays their first game at Nassau Veterans Memorial Coliseum, losing 16–11 to the Philadelphia Wings. The New York Titans will split their home games between the Coliseum and Madison Square Garden.
- January 27: Rochester Knighthawk star John Grant Jr. sets a new NLL record for points in a single game with 15 (9 goals, 6 assists) in a 22–18 defeat of the New York Titans.
- February 22: After a 12–9 loss to Toronto, the Calgary Roughnecks fired head coach Chris Hall, the only coach in team history.
- March 24: Calgary teammates Kaleb Toth and Tracey Kelusky both reach 500 career points in the same game, as Jeff Dowling wins his first game as head coach.
- March 31:
  - Rochester beats Philadelphia 12–10 in Rochester, setting a new franchise record with their ninth consecutive win.
  - The 1,000th regular-season game in league history is played at Xcel Energy Center in Saint Paul, with Colorado defeating Minnesota 11–9.
- April 6: The Calgary Roughnecks play their 100th game in franchise history against the Edmonton Rush at the Pengrowth Saddledome in Calgary.

== All Star Game ==
The 2007 All-Star Game was held at the Rose Garden Arena in Portland, Oregon on March 10, 2007. The East won the game 20–16, on the strength of Mark Steenhuis' six goals. Steenhuis was named game MVP. Steenhuis was also named game MVP in the 2004 All-Star game, and became the first player in NLL history to be named All-Star Game MVP twice. The game was broadcast on Sirius Satellite Radio; Travis Demers and Martin Wright called the action.

=== All-Star teams ===
Eastern Division starters	Western Division starters
John Grant, Jr., Rochester	Dan Carey, Colorado
John Tavares, Buffalo	Dan Dawson, Arizona
Thomas Hajek, Philadelphia	Andrew Turner, Edmonton *
Cam Woods, Chicago	Taylor Wray, Calgary
Geoff Snider, Philadelphia	Brodie Merrill, Portland **
Matt Roik, Philadelphia (goalie)	Rob Blasdell, Arizona (goalie)
Eastern Division Reserves	Western Division Reserves
Casey Powell, New York	Colin Doyle, San Jose
Aaron Wilson, Toronto	Gavin Prout, Colorado
Ryan Boyle, New York	Tracey Kelusky, Calgary
Scott Evans, Rochester	Jeff Zywicki, San Jose
Josh Sanderson, Toronto	Ryan Powell, Portland
Ryan Ward, Minnesota	Chris Gill, Edmonton ***
Shawn Williams, Rochester	Lewis Ratcliff, Calgary
Ryan Cousins, Minnesota	John Gallant, Colorado
Mark Steenhuis, Buffalo	Pat Jones, Portland
Pat McCready, Buffalo	Peter Lough, Arizona (Starting in place of Turner)
Steve Toll, Rochester	Josh Sims, Colorado (Starting in place of Merrill)
Brandon Miller, Chicago (goalie)	Gee Nash, Colorado (goalie)
	Richard Morgan, Portland (replacing Merrill)
	Jimmy Quinlan, Edmonton (replacing Gill)
	Bruce Alexander, Portland (replacing Turner)

* Unable to play for personal reasons
** Unable to play due to injury
*** Unable to play due to family commitments

== Awards ==
=== Annual ===
Award	Winner	Team
MVP Award	John Grant, Jr.	Rochester
Rookie of the Year Award	Ryan Benesch	Toronto
Les Bartley Award (Coach of the Year)	Ed Comeau	Rochester
GM of the Year Award	Marty O'Neill	Minnesota
Tom Borrelli Award	Ty Pilson	Calgary
Executive of the Year Award	Dave Zygaj	Buffalo
Defensive Player of the Year Award	Ryan Cousins	Minnesota
Transition Player of the Year Award	Steve Toll	Rochester
Goaltender of the Year Award	Anthony Cosmo	San Jose
Sportsmanship Award	Tracy Kelusky	Calgary
Championship Game MVP	John Grant, Jr.	Rochester

=== All-Pro Teams ===
First Team

- John Tavares, Buffalo
- John Grant, Jr., Rochester
- Dan Dawson, Arizona
- Steve Toll, Rochester
- Ryan Cousins, Minnesota
- Anthony Cosmo, San Jose

Second Team

- Gavin Prout, Colorado
- Colin Doyle, San Jose
- Casey Powell, New York
- Lewis Ratcliff, Calgary
- Shawn Williams, Rochester
- Nick Patterson, Minnesota

=== All-Rookie Team ===
- Ryan Benesch, Toronto
- Geoff Snider, Philadelphia
- Athan Iannucci, Philadelphia
- Bill McGlone, Chicago
- Nenad Gajic, Colorado
- Jamie Shewchuk, Colorado

=== Weekly awards ===
The NLL gives out awards weekly for the best overall player, best offensive player, best transition player (new for 2007), best defensive player, and best rookie.

Month	Week	Overall	Offensive	Defensive	Transition	Rookie
December	1	Brian Langtry	Brian Langtry	Dallas Eliuk	Josh Sims	Jed Prossner
January	2	Gee Nash	Chris Gill	Brandon Miller	Josh Sims	Bill McGlone
January	3	Pat O'Toole	Jeff Zywicki	Pat O'Toole	Brodie Merrill	Kyle Wailes
January	4	Rob Blasdell	John Tavares	Rob Blasdell	Mark Steenhuis	Ryan Benesch
January	5	John Grant, Jr.	John Grant, Jr.	Brandon Miller	Geoff Snider	Athan Iannucci
February	6	Bob Watson	Dan Dawson	Bob Watson	Josh Sims	Jamie Shewchuk
February	7	John Tavares	John Tavares	Curtis Palidwor	Mark Steenhuis	Ian Llord
February	8	Steve Dietrich	Dan Dawson	Steve Dietrich	Nenad Gajic	Kyle Wailes
February	9	John Grant, Jr.	John Grant, Jr.	Gee Nash	Pat McCready	Cody Jacobs
March	10	John Tavares	John Tavares	Peter Lough	Steve Toll	Brendan Mundorf
March	11	No awards given due to All-Star Game				
March	12	Gary Rosyski	Gary Rosyski	Curtis Palidwor	Mark Steenhuis	Ryan Benesch
March	13	John Tavares	John Tavares	Bob Watson	Mark Steenhuis	Ryan Benesch
April	14	Dan Dawson	Dan Dawson	Bob Watson	Brett Bucktooth	Mike McLellan
April	15	Steve Dietrich	John Grant, Jr.	Steve Dietrich	Mark Steenhuis	Athan Iannucci
April	16	Luke Wiles	Luke Wiles	Nick Patterson	Steve Toll	Matt Zash

=== Monthly awards ===
Awards are also given out monthly for the best overall player and best rookie.

Month	Overall	Rookie
January	Rob Blasdell	Geoff Snider
February	Gee Nash	Nenad Gajic
March	John Tavares	Ryan Benesch

== Statistics leaders ==
Bold numbers indicate new single-season records. Italics indicate tied single-season records.

Stat	Player	Team	Number
Goals	John Grant, Jr.	Rochester	51
Assists	John Tavares	Buffalo	61
Points	John Grant, Jr.	Rochester	111
Penalty Minutes	Scott Ditzell	Rochester	68
Shots on Goal	Lewis Ratcliff	Calgary	203
Loose Balls	Brodie Merrill	Portland	196
Save Pct	Anthony Cosmo	San Jose	79.2
GAA	Anthony Cosmo	San Jose	10.22

== Attendance ==
=== Regular season ===
Home team	Home games	Average attendance	Total Attendance
Colorado Mammoth	8	16,794	134,359
Toronto Rock	8	15,851	126,815
Buffalo Bandits	8	15,040	120,324
Calgary Roughnecks	8	12,707	101,659
Philadelphia Wings	8	11,318	90,547
Edmonton Rush	8	10,815	86,521
Rochester Knighthawks	8	9,951	79,612
Minnesota Swarm	8	9,405	75,244
New York Titans	8	7,657	61,262
Portland LumberJax	8	7,527	60,218
Arizona Sting	8	6,049	48,398
Chicago Shamrox	8	6,025	48,202
San Jose Stealth	8	4,676	37,414
**League**	**104**	**10,293**	**1,070,575**

=== Playoffs ===
Home team	Home games	Average attendance	Total Attendance
Colorado Mammoth	1	16,309	16,309
Calgary Roughnecks	3	10,057	10,057
Buffalo Bandits	1	9,003	9,003
Arizona Sting	2	8,360	16,720
Rochester Knighthawks	2	7,780	15,561
**League**	**7**	**9,664**	**67,650**

== See also ==
- 2007 in sports
