= Nenad Gajic =

Canadian lacrosse player

Personal information
- Nationality: Canadian
- Born: August 30, 1983 (age 42) Burnaby, BC, CAN
- Height: 6 ft 0 in (183 cm)
- Weight: 195 lb (88 kg; 13 st 13 lb)

Sport
- Position: Transition
- Shoots: Right
- NLL draft: 39th overall, 2004; San Jose Stealth
- NLL team: Colorado Mammoth
- Pro career: 2007–

Nenad Gajić (born August 30, 1983 in Burnaby, British Columbia) is a lacrosse player for the Colorado Mammoth of the National Lacrosse League and the New Westminster Salmonbellies of the Western Lacrosse Association.

== Lacrosse career ==
Gajić was the number 39 pick in the 2004 NLL draft by the San Jose Stealth. He then became a free agent and sat out for two seasons to pursue a hockey career at University of Nebraska-Omaha. Prior to the 2007 season, Gajic signed on with the Colorado Mammoth, where he scored 37 points, was named Transition Player of the Week in week 8, Rookie of the Month for February, and was named to the All-Rookie team.

In the summer, Gajić is the captain of the New Westminster Salmonbellies lacrosse club in the Western Lacrosse Association. Gajic missed the entire 2009 Mann Cup finalist campaign due to injury.

== Family ==
Nenad's brothers Ilija and Alex also play for the Mammoth. Both were drafted in the 2009 NLL entry draft - Ilija was chosen second overall by the Rochester Knighthawks, while Alex was chosen fifth overall by Colorado. In October 2009, Ilija was acquired by the Mammoth in a trade with Rochester in exchange for forward Gavin Prout. A fourth brother, Milan, is a professional ice hockey player currently playing for the Victoria Salmon Kings of the ECHL.
