= Chris Hall (lacrosse) =

Canadian lacrosse player and coach

Chris Hall (September 17, 1950 – December 21, 2014) was a Canadian lacrosse player and coach. He was inducted into National Lacrosse League Hall of Fame in 2014 and the Canadian Lacrosse Hall of Fame as builder in 2015. As a coach in the National Lacrosse League, he won the Champion's Cup with the Calgary Roughnecks and Washington Stealth.

Hall co-won the Les Bartley Award with Derek Keenan as the NLL coach of the year in 2010. He won the Mann Cup with the Victoria Shamrocks three times: twice as a coach and once as a player.

== NLL head coaching statistics ==
Team	Season	Regular Season				Playoffs				Playoff result
Team	Season	GC	W	L	W%	GC	W	L	W%	Playoff result
Calgary Roughnecks	2002	16	4	12	.250	–	–	–	–	Did not qualify
Calgary Roughnecks	2003	16	9	7	.563	1	0	1	.000	Lost Quarterfinal (BUF)
Calgary Roughnecks	2004	16	10	6	.625	3	3	0	1.000	Won Champions' Cup (BUF)
Calgary Roughnecks	2005	16	10	6	.625	1	0	1	.000	Lost Division Final (ARZ)
Calgary Roughnecks	2006	16	9	7	.563	1	0	1	.000	Lost Division Semifinal (COL)
Calgary Roughnecks	2007	5	4	1	.800	–	–	–	–	Fired
San Jose Stealth	2009	16	7	9	.438	2	1	1	.500	Lost Division Final (CGY)
Washington Stealth	2010	16	11	5	.688	3	3	0	1.000	Won Champions' Cup (TOR)
Washington Stealth	2011	16	8	8	.500	3	2	1	.667	Lost Champions' Cup (TOR)
Washington Stealth	2013	16	9	7	.563	3	2	1	.667	Lost Champions' Cup (ROC)
Vancouver Stealth	2014	18	4	14	.222	–	–	–	–	Did not qualify
Totals:	11	167	85	82	.509	17	11	6	.647	
