= Heritage Cup =

Heritage Cup may refer to:

- Heritage Cup (box lacrosse), an international box lacrosse tournament between the national teams of Canada, the United States, and the Iroquois Confederacy
- Heritage Cup (MLS), an annual cup rivalry between the Major League Soccer teams San Jose Earthquakes and Seattle Sounders FC
- NXT Heritage Cup, a professional wrestling title promoted by WWE
