= National Lacrosse League Goaltender of the Year Award =

The National Lacrosse League Goaltender of the Year Award is given annually to the best NLL goaltender of the year.

In the 2008 season, the award was sponsored by the US Navy and was known as the "US Navy Goaltender of the Year award". In the 2007 season, it was the "Progressive National Lacrosse League Goaltender of the Year Award".

== Past winners ==
Season	Winner	Team	Win #	Other finalists
2026	Brett Dobson	Georgia Swarm	1	Christian Del Bianco, Vancouver Warriors; Dillon Ward, Colorado Mammoth
2025	Frank Scigliano	Saskatchewan Rush	1	Matt Vinc, Buffalo Bandits; Nick Rose, Calgary Roughnecks
2024	Nick Rose	Toronto Rock	1	Doug Jamieson, Albany FireWolves; Chris Origlieri, San Diego Seals
2023	Christian Del Bianco	Calgary Roughnecks	1	Nick Rose, Toronto Rock; Matt Vinc, Buffalo Bandits
2022	Matt Vinc	Buffalo Bandits	8	Nick Rose, Toronto Rock; Dillon Ward, Colorado Mammoth
2021	Season cancelled			
2020	Doug Jamieson	New England Black Wolves	1	Zach Higgins, Philadelphia Wings; Dillon Ward, Colorado Mammoth
2019	Matt Vinc	Buffalo Bandits	7	Christian Del Bianco, Calgary Roughnecks; Dillon Ward, Colorado Mammoth
2018	Matt Vinc	Rochester Knighthawks	6	Christian Del Bianco, Calgary Roughnecks; Dillon Ward, Colorado Mammoth
2017	Dillon Ward	Colorado Mammoth	1	Mike Poulin, Georgia Swarm; Nick Rose, Toronto Rock
2016	Evan Kirk	New England Black Wolves	1	Nick Rose, Toronto Rock; Dillon Ward, Colorado Mammoth
2015	Matt Vinc	Rochester Knighthawks	5	Aaron Bold, Edmonton Rush; Brandon Miller, Toronto Rock
2014	Matt Vinc	Rochester Knighthawks	4	Aaron Bold, Edmonton Rush; Anthony Cosmo, Buffalo Bandits
2013	Matt Vinc	Rochester Knighthawks	3	
2012	Mike Poulin	Calgary Roughnecks	1	
2011	Matt Vinc	Rochester Knighthawks	2	
2010	Matt Vinc	Orlando Titans	1	
2009	Ken Montour	Buffalo Bandits	1	
2008	Bob Watson	Toronto Rock	2	
2007	Anthony Cosmo	San Jose Stealth	1	
2006	Steve Dietrich	Buffalo Bandits	2	
2005	Steve Dietrich	Buffalo Bandits	1	
2004	Gord Nash	Colorado Mammoth	1	
2003	Pat O'Toole	Rochester Knighthawks	1	
2002	Rob Blasdell	Albany Attack	1	
2001	Bob Watson	Toronto Rock	1	
