= Rob Blasdell =

Canadian lacrosse player

Personal information
- Nickname: Blazer
- Born: May 15, 1970 (age 56) Brantford, Ontario, Canada
- Height: 6 ft 1 in (185 cm)
- Weight: 205 lb (93 kg; 14 st 9 lb)

Sport
- Position: Goaltender
- Shoots: Left
- NLL team Former teams: Edmonton Rush; Arizona Sting; San Jose Stealth; Albany Attack; Toronto Rock; Ontario Raiders; Philadelphia Wings
- Pro career: 1998–

Rob "Blazer" Blasdell (born May 15, 1970) is a former Canadian lacrosse goaltender in the National Lacrosse League.

== Professional career ==
Blasdell began his career with the Ontario Raiders in 1998, moving with them to Toronto the next year. After being left unprotected by the Rock, Blasdell was selected by the expansion Albany Attack in the 1999 expansion draft. Blasdell played four seasons in Albany, and was named NLL Goaltender of the Year in 2002 when he led the Attack to the NLL finals.

The Attack moved to San Jose before the 2004 season and Blasdell played in all 16 games that season, but after a blockbuster trade brought goaltender Anthony Cosmo to San Jose in the summer of 2004, Blasdell served as a backup for Cosmo for the 2005 season. He was then dealt to the Arizona Sting, where he earned the starting role and returned to the championship game in 2007.

After the cancellation and subsequent reinstatement of the 2008 season, the Arizona Sting and Boston Blazers announced that they would not be playing in 2008. A dispersal draft was held, and Blasdell was selected third overall by the Philadelphia Wings. When the Arizona Sting ceased operations prior to the 2009 NLL season, another dispersal draft was held, and Blasdell was again selected by the Philadelphia Wings.

== Statistics ==
=== NLL ===
		Regular Season						Playoffs
Season	Team	GP	Min	GA	Sv	GAA	Sv %	GP	Min	GA	Sv	GAA	Sv %
1998	Ontario	5	161	42	90	15.65	68.18%	--	--	--	--	--	--
1999	Toronto	5	149	21	87	8.46	80.56%	2	0	0	0	0.00	0.00%
2000	Albany	12	674	144	434	12.82	75.09%	--	--	--	--	--	--
2001	Albany	13	745	151	474	12.16	75.84%	--	--	--	--	--	--
2002	Albany	16	934	187	644	12.01	77.50%	2	118	23	78	11.67	77.23%
2003	Albany	16	855	168	513	11.79	75.33%	--	--	--	--	--	--
2004	San Jose	16	600	128	333	12.79	72.23%	1	43	9	22	12.50	70.97%
2005	San Jose	5	157	35	95	13.37	73.08%	--	--	--	--	--	--
2006	Arizona	12	622	129	362	12.45	73.73%	2	118	24	80	12.17	76.92%
2007	Arizona	16	844	154	490	10.95	76.09%	3	178	29	133	9.76	82.10%
2008	Philadelphia	14	659	153	434	13.93	75.09%	1	30	8	19	16.00	70.37%
NLL totals		130	6401	1312	3956	12.30	75.09%	11	488	93	332	11.43	78.12%

Note: GP = Games played; Min = Minutes played; GA = Goals-against; GAA = Goals-against average; Sv = Shots saved; SV% = Save percentage;

== Awards ==
Preceded by Bob Watson	NLL Goaltender of the Year; 2002	Succeeded by Pat O'Toole
