= Brandon Goodwin (lacrosse) =

Canadian lacrosse player (born 1991)

Personal information
- Nationality: Canadian
- Born: April 1, 1991 (age 35)
- Height: 6 ft 2 in (188 cm)
- Weight: 212 lb (96 kg; 15 st 2 lb)

Sport
- Position: Transition
- Shoots: Right
- NLL draft: 9th overall, 2014; Buffalo Bandits
- NLL team Former teams: Vancouver Warriors; Buffalo Bandits; Calgary Roughnecks
- WLA team Former teams: New Westminster Salmonbellies; Coquitlam Adanacs; Langley Thunder
- Pro career: 2015–

Brandon Goodwin (born April 1, 1991) is a professional lacrosse player for the Vancouver Warriors of the National Lacrosse League and the New Westminster Salmonbellies of the Western Lacrosse Association. Hailing from New Westminster, British Columbia, Goodwin is the son of Steve Goodwin, the head coach of the Salmonbellies, for whose junior arm Goodwin played. A graduate of New Westminster Secondary School, Goodwin played collegiality first at ASA College where he was a two-time NJCAA All-American, and later at Adelphi University.

After four years with the Junior A Salmonbellies, Goodwin was drafted by the Langley Thunder in 2012, and was traded to the Coquitlam Adanacs seven games into the 2013 season. He was drafted with the final pick in the first round of the 2014 NLL Entry Draft by the Bandits.
