= 2004 NLL season =

- League: National Lacrosse League
- Sport: Indoor lacrosse
- Duration: December 26, 2003 – May 7, 2004
- Games: 16
- Teams: 10
- TV partner: Fox Sports Net

Regular season
- Season MVP: Jim Veltman (Toronto Rock)
- Top scorer: Gary Gait (Colorado Mammoth)

Playoffs
- Eastern champions: Toronto Rock
- Eastern runners-up: Rochester Knighthawks
- Western champions: Colorado Mammoth
- Western runners-up: San Jose Stealth

Champion's Cup
- Champions: Calgary Roughnecks (1st title)
- Runners-up: Buffalo Bandits
- Finals MVP: Curtis Palidwor (Calgary)

NLL seasons
- ← 2003 season 2005 season →

The 2004 National Lacrosse League season is the 18th season in the NLL that began on December 26, 2003, with the Arizona Sting hosting the Vancouver Ravens. That game was the Sting's first-ever game and the first event held in the new Glendale Arena (now Gila River Arena) in Glendale, Arizona. The season concluded with the championship game on May 7, 2004. Over 19,000 fans, the second largest crowd ever at an NLL game, packed the Pengrowth Saddledome (now Scotiabank Saddledome) to watch the Calgary Roughnecks defeat the Buffalo Bandits 14–11. This game was the first NLL championship game since 1998 that did not feature the Toronto Rock.

The collective bargaining agreement (CBA) between the league and the Professional Lacrosse Players' Association expired before the 2004 season, and the lack of a new agreement caused a 12-day players strike in December 2003. On December 17, the NLL and PLPA announced that the previous CBA had been extended by one year, guaranteeing that the 2004 season would be played without strikes or lockouts.

== Team movement ==
2004 was a season of turmoil for the NLL – two franchises disappeared while three others moved cross-country, causing a division realignment. Gone was the three-division format that had been used in the preceding two seasons; the league was now split into East and West divisions. The Ottawa Rebel and New York Saints franchises both folded, and the following teams moved:

- the Columbus Landsharks moved to Glendale, Arizona, becoming the Arizona Sting
- the New Jersey Storm moved to Anaheim, California, becoming the Anaheim Storm
- the Albany Attack moved to San Jose, California, becoming the San Jose Stealth

These three joined Colorado, Calgary, and Vancouver in the West division, while perennial rivals Toronto, Buffalo, Rochester, and Philadelphia were left to fight over three playoff spots in the East.

=== Teams ===
2004 National Lacrosse League
Division	Team	City	Arena	Capacity
East	Buffalo Bandits	Buffalo, New York	HSBC Arena	18,690
East	Philadelphia Wings	Philadelphia, Pennsylvania	Wachovia Center	19,523
East	Rochester Knighthawks	Rochester, New York	Blue Cross Arena	10,662
East	Toronto Rock	Toronto, Ontario	Air Canada Centre	18,800
West	Anaheim Storm	Anaheim, California	Arrowhead Pond	17,174
West	Arizona Sting	Glendale, Arizona	Glendale Arena	17,125
West	Calgary Roughnecks	Calgary, Alberta	Pengrowth Saddledome	19,289
West	Colorado Mammoth	Denver, Colorado	Pepsi Center	18,007
West	San Jose Stealth	San Jose, California	HP Pavilion	17,496
West	Vancouver Ravens	Vancouver, British Columbia	General Motors Place	18,514

=== Map of teams ===
East Division West Division

== Milestones ==
- January 9: The Anaheim Storm play their first ever home game, losing to the Arizona Sting 19–18 in the first triple overtime game in NLL history. Mark Shepherd scored the teams first regulation goal. This is a record not likely to ever be broken – before the 2005 season, the NLL changed overtime periods to 15 minutes from five. Since then, no games have even seen double overtime.
- April 3: Colorado Mammoth fans threw socks at the game floor after Gary Gait scored 6 goals against the Anaheim Storm. Creating the tradition of the "Sock Trick". It also resulted in a delay of game penalty being called on Gary Gait

== Final standings ==
=== Regular season ===
East Division
P	Team	GP	W	L	PCT	GB	Home	Road	GF	GA	Diff	GF/GP	GA/GP
1	Toronto Rock – xy	16	10	6	.625	0.0	5–3	5–3	202	176	+26	12.62	11.00
2	Rochester Knighthawks – x	16	8	8	.500	2.0	6–2	2–6	173	186	−13	10.81	11.62
3	Buffalo Bandits – x	16	8	8	.500	2.0	4–4	4–4	205	198	+7	12.81	12.38
4	Philadelphia Wings	16	7	9	.438	3.0	3–5	4–4	192	198	−6	12.00	12.38

West Division
P	Team	GP	W	L	PCT	GB	Home	Road	GF	GA	Diff	GF/GP	GA/GP
1	Colorado Mammoth – xyz	16	13	3	.812	0.0	7–1	6–2	223	173	+50	13.94	10.81
2	San Jose Stealth – x	16	11	5	.688	2.0	7–1	4–4	204	201	+3	12.75	12.56
3	Calgary Roughnecks – x	16	10	6	.625	3.0	4–4	6–2	214	187	+27	13.38	11.69
4	Arizona Sting	16	7	9	.438	6.0	6–2	1–7	200	208	−8	12.50	13.00
5	Vancouver Ravens	16	5	11	.312	8.0	3–5	2–6	188	213	−25	11.75	13.31
6	Anaheim Storm	16	1	15	.062	12.0	1–7	0–8	171	227	−56	10.69	14.19

x: Clinched playoff berth; c: Clinched playoff berth by crossing over to another division; y: Clinched division; z: Clinched best regular season record; GP: Games Played
W: Wins; L: Losses; GB: Games back; PCT: Win percentage; Home: Record at Home; Road: Record on the Road; GF: Goals scored; GA: Goals allowed
Differential: Difference between goals scored and allowed; GF/GP: Average number of goals scored per game; GA/GP: Average number of goals allowed per game

=== Playoffs ===
Divisional Semifinals
East Division
3	Buffalo	13
2	Rochester	9
West Division
3	Calgary	15
2	San Jose	14

Divisional Finals
3	Buffalo	19
1	Toronto	10
3	Calgary	13
1	Colorado	11

Championship
E3	Buffalo	11
W3	Calgary	14

== All Star Game ==
The 2004 All-Star Game was held at Pepsi Center in Denver on February 22, 2004. The East division defeated the West 19–15, and Buffalo's Mark Steenhuis was named game MVP.

=== All-Star teams ===
Eastern Division starters	Western Division starters
Colin Doyle, Toronto	Gary Gait, Colorado
Blaine Manning, Toronto	Tracey Kelusky, Calgary
John Tavares, Buffalo	Gavin Prout, Colorado
Pat Coyle, Toronto	Jim Moss, San Jose
Mike Hasen, Rochester	Andy Ogilvie, Vancouver
Pat O'Toole, Rochester (goalie)	Gee Nash, Colorado (goalie)
Eastern Division Reserves	Western Division Reserves
Mike Accursi, Buffalo	Ted Dowling, Calgary
Jake Bergey, Philadelphia	Mark Shepherd, Anaheim
Paul Cantabene, Philadelphia	Jay Jalbert, Colorado
Glenn Clark, Toronto	Rob Kirkby, Calgary
Kyle Couling, Buffalo	Mike Law, Anaheim
Steve Dietrich, Buffalo (goalie)	Pat Maddalena, Arizona
Derek Malawsky, Rochester	Mike Miron, Arizona (goalie)
Tom Marechek, Philadelphia	Casey Powell, Anaheim
Jeff Ratcliffe, Philadelphia	Josh Sanderson, San Jose
Mark Steenhuis, Buffalo	Dan Stroup, Vancouver
Andrew Turner, Rochester	Kaleb Toth, Calgary
Jim Veltman, Toronto	Cam Woods, San Jose

== Awards ==
Award	Winner	Team
MVP Award	Jim Veltman	Toronto
Rookie of the Year Award	Taylor Wray	Calgary
Les Bartley Award (Coach of the Year)	Paul Day	Rochester
GM of the Year Award	John Mouradian	San Jose
Executive of the Year Award	Steve Govett	Colorado
Defensive Player of the Year Award	Cam Woods (tie)	San Jose
	Taylor Wray	Calgary
Goaltender of the Year Award	Gord Nash	Colorado
Sportsmanship Award	Gary Gait (tie)	Colorado
	Peter Lough	Arizona
Championship Game MVP	Curtis Palidwor	Calgary

=== Weekly awards ===
The NLL gives out awards weekly for the best overall player, best offensive player, best defensive player, and best rookie.

Week	Overall	Offensive	Defensive	Rookie
1	No awards given			
2	Gary Gait	Gary Gait	Mike Miron	AJ Shannon
3	Ted Dowling	John Grant, Jr.	Matt King	Randy Daly
4	Blaine Manning	Blaine Manning	Andy Ogilvie	Craig Conn
5	Mike Regan	Mike Regan	Brandon Miller	Nick Patterson
6	John Tavares	Shawn Williams	Curtis Palidwor	Steve Hoar
7	Dallas Eliuk	Derek Malawsky	Dallas Eliuk	Taylor Wray
8	John Tavares	Jeff Ratcliffe	Pat O'Toole	Ryan Ward
9	Dan Teat	Mark Shepherd	Cam Woods	AJ Shannon
10	Curtis Palidwor	Shawn Williams	Curtis Palidwor	Scott Evans
11	Mike Miron	Pat Maddalena	Mike Miron	Cam Bergman
12	Jim Veltman	Jim Veltman	Dwight Maetche	Scott Evans
13	Shawn Williams	Shawn Williams	Peter Lough	Chris Cercy
14	Jim Veltman	Colin Doyle	Dallas Eliuk	Ryan Ward
15	Shawn Williams	Shawn Williams	Pat O'Toole	Curtis Smith
16	Shawn Williams	Shawn Williams	Pat O'Toole	Brad MacDonald

=== Monthly awards ===
Awards are also given out monthly for the best overall player and best rookie.

Month	Overall	Rookie
Jan	Gavin Prout	Craig Conn
Feb	John Tavares	Craig Conn
Mar	Jim Veltman	Taylor Wray

== Statistics leaders ==
Bold numbers indicate new single-season records. Italics indicate tied single-season records.

Stat	Player	Team	Number
Goals	Gary Gait	Colorado	55
Assists	Josh Sanderson	San Jose	61
Points	Gary Gait	Colorado	93
Penalty Minutes	Troy Bonterre	Arizona	73
Loose Balls	Jim Veltman	Toronto	179
Save Pct	Gee Nash	Colorado	79.0

== Attendance ==
=== Regular season ===
Home team	Home games	Average attendance	Total attendance
Colorado Mammoth	8	17,617	140,942
Toronto Rock	8	16,907	135,256
Philadelphia Wings	8	13,640	109,123
Calgary Roughnecks	8	9,994	79,950
Buffalo Bandits	8	8,929	71,435
Rochester Knighthawks	8	8,787	70,293
Vancouver Ravens	8	7,124	56,992
Arizona Sting	8	5,768	46,147
San Jose Stealth	8	5,332	42,656
Anaheim Storm	8	4,750	37,997
**League**	**80**	**9,749**	**779,946**

=== Playoffs ===
Home team	Home games	Average attendance	Total attendance
Calgary Roughnecks	1	19,289	19,289
Toronto Rock	1	14,618	14,618
Colorado Mammoth	1	14,283	14,283
Rochester Knighthawks	1	7,029	7,029
San Jose Stealth	1	4,874	4,874
**League**	**5**	**12,019**	**60,093**

== See also ==
- 2004 in sports
