= Andy Ogilvie =

Canadian lacrosse player (born 1965)

Personal information
- Born: January 3, 1965 (age 61) Peterborough, Ontario, Canada
- Height: 6 ft 1 in (185 cm)
- Weight: 210 lb (95 kg; 15 st 0 lb)

Sport
- Position: Defence
- Shoots: Left
- NLL team: Calgary Roughnecks
- Pro career: 1999–2007

Andy Ogilvie (born January 3, 1965) is a former professional lacrosse player. He played for the Buffalo Bandits, Vancouver Ravens and Calgary Roughnecks in the National Lacrosse League. His NLL career lasted from 1999 to 2007. He was inducted into the Canadian Lacrosse Hall of Fame in 2014 along with Gary Gait and Paul Gait.

Ogilvie was born in Peterborough, Ontario. In Ogilvie's career, he won the Mann Cup three times (1989 and 1991 with New Westminster Salmonbellies, 2001 with Coquitlam Adanacs, the Minto Cup twice (1983, 1986), the world box lacrosse championships once, and a bronze at the 1994 world field lacrosse championships.

== Awards ==
- top OLA junior A defender: 1986
- WLA playoff MVP: 1989, 1991
- WLA regular season MVP: 1993
- Mike Kelly Memorial Trophy (Mann Cup series MVP): 2001

== Statistics ==
=== NLL ===
Andy Ogilvie		Regular season									Playoffs								
Season	Team	GP	G	A	Pts	LB	PIM	Pts/GP	LB/GP	PIM/GP	GP	G	A	Pts	LB	PIM	Pts/GP	LB/GP	PIM/GP
1999	Buffalo Bandits	4	1	5	6	19	19	1.50	4.75	4.75	–	–	–	–	–	–	–	–	–
2000	Buffalo Bandits	10	1	14	15	79	59	1.50	7.90	5.90	1	0	1	1	9	4	1.00	9.00	4.00
2001	Buffalo Bandits	13	1	11	12	88	51	0.92	6.77	3.92	–	–	–	–	–	–	–	–	–
2002	Buffalo Bandits	7	3	12	15	69	16	2.14	9.86	2.29	–	–	–	–	–	–	–	–	–
2003	Buffalo Bandits	10	1	5	6	55	56	0.60	5.50	5.60	2	0	1	1	12	4	0.50	6.00	2.00
2004	Buffalo Bandits	3	2	3	5	24	34	1.67	8.00	11.33	3	0	1	1	23	6	0.33	7.67	2.00
2004	Vancouver Ravens	7	3	4	7	51	23	1.00	7.29	3.29	–	–	–	–	–	–	–	–	–
2005	Calgary Roughnecks	6	2	7	9	39	28	1.50	6.50	4.67	0	0	0	0	0	0	0.00	0.00	0.00
2006	Calgary Roughnecks	8	0	5	5	40	25	0.63	5.00	3.13	1	0	0	0	6	4	0.00	6.00	4.00
2007	Calgary Roughnecks	6	0	7	7	28	29	1.17	4.67	4.83	1	0	1	1	3	0	1.00	3.00	0.00
		74	14	73	87	492	340	1.18	6.65	4.59	8	0	4	4	53	18	0.50	6.63	2.25
Career Total:		82	14	77	91	545	358	1.11	6.65	4.37									

GP–Games played; G–Goals; A–Assists; Pts–Points; LB–Loose balls; PIM–Penalty minutes; Pts/GP–Points per games played; LB/GP–Loose balls per games played; PIM/GP–Penalty minutes per games played.
