= Shawn Wilkins =

American football player (born 1994)

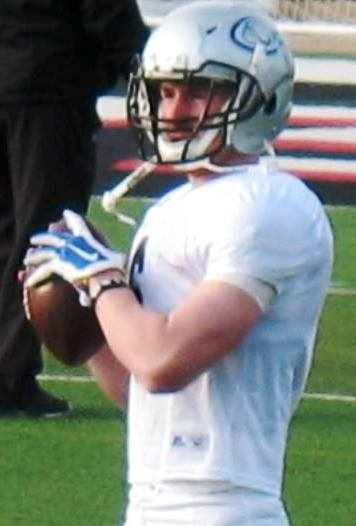
Shawn Wilkins

Shawn Wilkins (born October 16, 1994) is an American football player (quarterback and wide receiver).

Wilkins, a highly recruited football player out of Blackstone Valley Regional Vocational Technical High School in Upton, Massachusetts, was the first football player to be on scholarship at a Division I FCS football program (Bryant University). Wilkins completed his high school career as one of the team captains, MVP for Offense, Colonial Athletic League All Star - 2011 & 2012, Ranked in the top ten for receiving in Central Mass (two years), and ranked 27th overall class of 2013 in Massachusetts by ESPNBoston. He committed to Bryant in April 2013.

While at Bryant, Wilkins was a wide receiver and backup long snapper. Upon transferring to Penn State University (World Campus) Wilkins joined Europlayers and signed under contract to play football in Germany for the GFL. Wilkins was a member of the Pforzheim Wilddogs playing wide receiver, safety, cornerback, punter, kick returner and back-up quarterback. Upon completion of his season with the Wilddogs, Wilkins returned to a tryout with the Lehigh Valley Steelhawks of the Professional Indoor Football League. Through that tryout and later into 2016 Wilkins received a roster spot with the Steel City Stampede of the Major Indoor Football League.

On January 10, 2016, Wilkins attended the College Gridiron Showcase in Bedford, Texas for a Pro Free Agent Day as a quarterback. It was from this showcase, Wilkins moved to Pennsylvania to train with quarterback coach Anthony Glaud of ASK Athletics.

On April 16, 2016, Wilkins competed for a roster spot on the Winnipeg Blue Bombers, opting instead to head back to the GFL (third division) and play the 2017 season with the Bremerhaven Seahawks. He led the Bremerhaven Seahawks of the GFL 4th division to a 5–0 start during the 2017 season, before being sidelined with a concussion.

To round out the 2017 season, Wilkins was chosen in the 60th round of the Rivals Professional Football League draft by the Michigan Bearcats.
