= Tracey Kelusky =

Canadian lacrosse player and coach

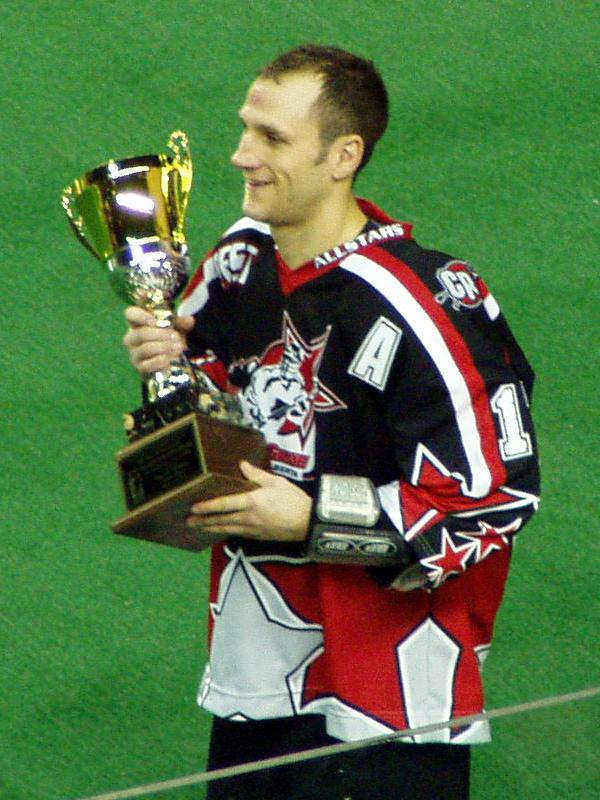

Personal information
- Nickname: TK
- Born: September 9, 1975 (age 51) Peterborough, Ontario, Canada
- Height: 5 ft 10 in (178 cm)
- Weight: 180 lb (82 kg; 12 st 12 lb)

Sport
- Position: Forward
- Shoots: Right
- NLL draft: 1st overall, 2000; Columbus Landsharks
- NLL teams: Philadelphia Wings; Buffalo Bandits; Calgary Roughnecks; Montreal Express; Columbus Landsharks
- MSL team: Peterborough Lakers
- Pro career: 2001–2014

Tracey Kelusky (born September 9, 1975) is a Canadian former professional box lacrosse player and was the first and last head coach of Panther City LC before the team folded following the 2024 NLL season. Kelusky played for the Columbus Landsharks, Montreal Express, Calgary Roughnecks, Buffalo Bandits and Philadelphia Wings. While with the Roughnecks, Kelusky was named captain and led them to titles in 2004 and 2009.

== College career ==
Kelusky played college lacrosse at the University of Hartford, making his mark in the NCAA record books by scoring 59 goals in 14 games during the 2000 season.

== Professional career ==
Kelusky joined the NLL in the 2000–2001 season with the Columbus Landsharks and was named the NLL Rookie of the Year. In the 2001–2002 season, he played for the expansion franchise Montreal Express. The Roughnecks picked up Kelusky first overall in the dispersal draft after the Express franchise folded in 2002.

In the 2005 National Lacrosse League All-Star Game, Kelusky won the MVP in front of a home crowd at the Pengrowth Saddledome. During the 2009 NLL season, he was named a reserve to the All-Star game.

In December 2013, Kelusky was acquired by the Philadelphia Wings as a free agent.

On September 19, 2014, Kelusky announced he was retiring from professional lacrosse.

== Coaching career ==
After retiring as a player, Kelusky became an assistant coach for the New England Blackwolves. For the 2019–20 season, he served as offensive coach for the Philadelphia Wings. Kelusky became the first-ever head coach for the expansion Panther City LC club in 2021.

== Statistics ==
=== NLL ===
Tracey Kelusky		Regular season									Playoffs								
Season	Team	GP	G	A	Pts	LB	PIM	Pts/GP	LB/GP	PIM/GP	GP	G	A	Pts	LB	PIM	Pts/GP	LB/GP	PIM/GP
2001	Columbus Landsharks	14	24	27	51	98	20	3.64	7.00	1.43	–	–	–	–	–	–	–	–	–
2002	Montreal Express	16	44	50	94	98	8	5.88	6.13	0.50	–	–	–	–	–	–	–	–	–
2003	Calgary Roughnecks	13	37	26	63	51	16	4.85	3.92	1.23	1	3	2	5	9	2	5.00	9.00	2.00
2004	Calgary Roughnecks	16	32	37	69	73	8	4.31	4.56	0.50	3	7	4	11	13	4	3.67	4.33	1.33
2005	Calgary Roughnecks	16	45	32	77	77	12	4.81	4.81	0.75	1	4	1	5	3	0	5.00	3.00	0.00
2006	Calgary Roughnecks	16	35	34	69	75	17	4.31	4.69	1.06	1	4	4	8	6	0	8.00	6.00	0.00
2007	Calgary Roughnecks	16	35	53	88	95	0	5.50	5.94	0.00	1	3	1	4	2	0	4.00	2.00	0.00
2008	Calgary Roughnecks	7	11	14	25	26	5	3.57	3.71	0.71	2	3	7	10	6	0	5.00	3.00	0.00
2009	Calgary Roughnecks	16	31	53	84	84	4	5.25	5.25	0.25	3	9	5	14	16	0	4.67	5.33	0.00
2010	Calgary Roughnecks	13	30	34	64	56	10	4.92	4.31	0.77	1	1	2	3	3	0	3.00	3.00	0.00
2011	Buffalo Bandits	16	21	33	54	54	11	3.38	3.38	0.69	2	2	3	5	10	0	2.50	5.00	0.00
2012	Buffalo Bandits	12	12	16	28	37	2	2.33	3.08	0.17	1	1	1	2	4	0	2.00	4.00	0.00
2013	Buffalo Bandits	7	4	6	10	22	9	1.43	3.14	1.29	–	–	–	–	–	–	–	–	–
2014	Philadelphia Wings	17	22	25	47	40	17	2.76	2.35	1.00	–	–	–	–	–	–	–	–	–
		195	383	440	823	886	139	4.22	4.54	0.71	16	37	30	67	72	6	4.19	4.50	0.38
Career Total:		211	420	470	890	958	145	4.22	4.54	0.69									

GP–Games played; G–Goals; A–Assists; Pts–Points; LB–Loose balls; PIM–Penalty minutes; Pts/GP–Points per games played; LB/GP–Loose balls per games played; PIM/GP–Penalty minutes per games played.

=== NLL head coaching statistics ===
Team	Season	Regular Season				Playoffs				Playoff result
Team	Season	GC	W	L	W%	GC	W	L	W%	Playoff result
Panther City Lacrosse Club	2022	18	7	11	.389	–	–	–	–	Did not qualify
Panther City Lacrosse Club	2023	18	10	8	.556	1	0	1	.000	Lost Western Conference Semifinal (CGY)
Panther City Lacrosse Club	2024	18	9	9	.500	1	0	1	.000	Lost NLL Quarterfinal (SD)
Totals:	3	54	26	28	.481	2	0	2	.000	

== Awards ==
- 2000, Drafted first overall by the Columbus Landsharks
- 2001, NLL Rookie of the Year
- 2001, NLL second team all pro
- 2002, NLL first team all pro
- 2002, Inside Lacrosse Magazine's NLL MVP (voted by NLL players and coaches)
- 2002, part of Canada's silver medal team at the World Lacrosse Championship
- 2002, part of Team Canada at the Heritage Cup
- 2003, NLL first team all pro
- 2003, part of Canada's gold medal team at the World Indoor Lacrosse Championship
- 2004, part of Canada's Heritage Cup-winning team
- 2004, NLL first team all pro
- 2004, Champion's Cup
- 2005, NLL All Star Game Most Valuable Player
- 2005, NLL second team all pro
- 2007, NLL Sportsmanship Award
- 2009, Champion's Cup
- 2022, Les Bartley Award

== Personal life ==
Kelusky is a boyhood friend of professional wrestler Bobby Roode. Kelusky even made an appearance on the December 29th, 2011 edition of Impact Wrestling, where he confronted Roode and was attacked by him.

== See also ==
- NCAA Men's Division I Lacrosse Records

Preceded by John Grant Jr	NLL Rookie of the Year; 2001	Succeeded by Blaine Manning
Preceded by Mark Steenhuis	NLL All-Star Game MVP; 2005	Succeeded by Lewis Ratcliff
Preceded by Sean Greenhalgh	NLL Sportsmanship Award; 2007	Succeeded by Dan Carey
