= Scott Evans (lacrosse) =

Canadian lacrosse player (born 1981)

Personal information
- Born: July 27, 1981 (age 45) Peterborough, Ontario, Canada
- Height: 6 ft 1 in (185 cm)
- Weight: 220 lb (100 kg; 15 st 10 lb)

Sport
- Position: Forward
- NLL draft: 5th overall, 2003; Rochester Knighthawks
- NLL team Former teams: Free Agent; Rochester Knighthawks; Edmonton Rush; Toronto Rock
- Pro career: 2004–

Scott Evans (born July 27, 1981, in Peterborough, Ontario) is a lacrosse who most recently played for the Edmonton Rush in the National Lacrosse League. Evans also plays for the Peterborough Lakers of Major Series Lacrosse (MSL) in the summer and won the Mann Cup with the Lakers in both 2004 and 2006.

== Professional career ==
In 2003, Evans was drafted by the Rochester Knighthawks in the first round, fifth overall. During the 2004 NLL season, Evans was selected to the NLL All-Rookie team and was named rookie of the week twice.

On December 16, it was announced that Evans will miss the entire 2009 season with a torn ACL.

== Statistics ==
=== NLL ===
Scott Evans		Regular season									Playoffs								
Season	Team	GP	G	A	Pts	LB	PIM	Pts/GP	LB/GP	PIM/GP	GP	G	A	Pts	LB	PIM	Pts/GP	LB/GP	PIM/GP
2004	Rochester Knighthawks	16	16	19	35	71	44	2.19	4.44	2.75	1	0	0	0	5	0	0.00	5.00	0.00
2005	Rochester Knighthawks	16	29	23	52	59	25	3.25	3.69	1.56	2	4	3	7	8	2	3.50	4.00	1.00
2006	Rochester Knighthawks	16	22	48	70	81	55	4.38	5.06	3.44	2	3	7	10	12	7	5.00	6.00	3.50
2007	Rochester Knighthawks	16	45	42	87	78	48	5.44	4.88	3.00	3	3	9	12	20	6	4.00	6.67	2.00
2008	Rochester Knighthawks	16	44	34	78	88	28	4.88	5.50	1.75	–	–	–	–	–	–	–	–	–
2010	Rochester Knighthawks	10	7	13	20	43	79	2.00	4.30	7.90	–	–	–	–	–	–	–	–	–
2011	Edmonton Rush	13	27	19	46	46	54	3.54	3.54	4.15	–	–	–	–	–	–	–	–	–
2012	Edmonton Rush	12	23	24	47	42	52	3.92	3.50	4.33	–	–	–	–	–	–	–	–	–
2013	Toronto Rock	11	11	11	22	40	12	2.00	3.64	1.09	1	2	1	3	3	19	3.00	3.00	19.00
		126	224	233	457	548	397	3.63	4.35	3.15	9	12	20	32	48	34	3.56	5.33	3.78
Career Total:		135	236	253	489	596	431	3.62	4.41	3.19									

GP–Games played; G–Goals; A–Assists; Pts–Points; LB–Loose balls; PIM–Penalty minutes; Pts/GP–Points per games played; LB/GP–Loose balls per games played; PIM/GP–Penalty minutes per games played.
