= Curtis Palidwor =

Canadian lacrosse player

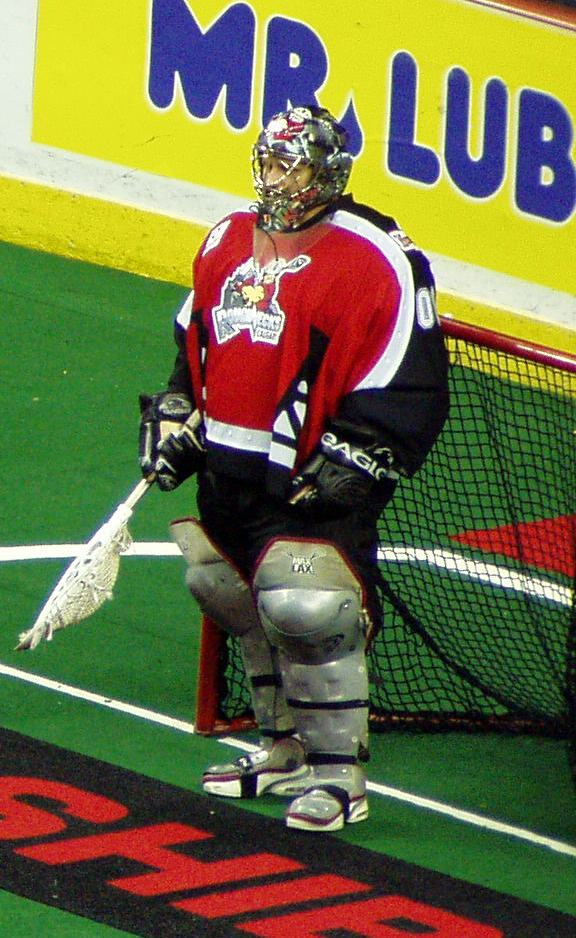

Personal information
- Nickname(s): Pally, Shut-The-Door
- Nationality: Canadian
- Born: January 16, 1973 (age 53) New Westminster, British Columbia, Canada
- Height: 5 ft 11 in (180 cm)
- Weight: 190 lb (86 kg; 13 st 8 lb)

Sport
- Position: Goaltender
- Shoots: Left
- NLL draft: 9th overall, 1998; New York Saints
- NLL team Former teams: Calgary Roughnecks; Colorado Mammoth; Toronto Rock; Edmonton Rush; New York Titans; Montreal Express; Columbus Landsharks
- Pro career: 2001–

Curtis Palidwor (born January 16, 1973, in New Westminster, British Columbia) is a former goaltender for the Calgary Roughnecks in the National Lacrosse League. In 2004 he was named MVP (Most Valuable Player) of the NLL's Champions Cup game, backstopping the Roughnecks to a 14–11 victory over the Buffalo Bandits.

Palidwor was awarded "Player of the Month" honors in March of the 2008 NLL season.

During the 2009 season, Palidwor was traded from the Colorado Mammoth to the Toronto Rock for a second-round pick in the 2010 entry draft. In his first and only game as a member of the Rock, he made 16 saves and allowed 10 goals in 45 minutes as the Rock lost 18–10 to Rochester. A week later, the trade was reversed as Palidwor was traded back to the Mammoth for the same draft pick.

== Statistics ==
=== NLL ===
Curtis Palidwor		Regular Season								Playoffs							
Season	Team	GP	Min	W	L	GA	GAA	Sv	Sv %	GP	Min	W	L	GA	GAA	Sv	Sv %
2001	Columbus Landsharks	13	429:30	2	6	110	15.37	266	0.707	–	–	–	–	–	–	–	–
2002	Montreal Express	16	932:18	8	8	222	14.29	639	0.742	–	–	–	–	–	–	–	–
2003	Calgary Roughnecks	16	789:12	9	5	162	12.32	502	0.756	1	21:12	0	1	8	22.64	12	0.600
2004	Calgary Roughnecks	16	778:31	8	5	148	11.41	496	0.770	3	179:30	3	0	36	12.03	140	0.795
2005	Calgary Roughnecks	16	848:57	7	6	189	13.36	561	0.748	1	60:00	0	1	18	18.00	25	0.581
2006	Calgary Roughnecks	16	819:15	8	5	146	10.69	554	0.791	1	24:47	0	0	10	24.21	20	0.667
2007	New York Titans	5	163:27	1	1	44	16.15	120	0.732	–	–	–	–	–	–	–	–
2007	Edmonton Rush	12	709:44	5	7	124	10.48	465	0.789	–	–	–	–	–	–	–	–
2008	Edmonton Rush	14	602:06	4	8	123	12.26	369	0.750	–	–	–	–	–	–	–	–
2009	Toronto Rock	1	45:26	0	1	10	13.21	16	0.615	–	–	–	–	–	–	–	–
2009	Colorado Mammoth	5	111:51	1	1	22	11.80	68	0.756	1	37:07	0	0	5	8.08	22	0.815
2010	Colorado Mammoth	1	21:11	0	0	4	11.33	15	0.789	–	–	–	–	–	–	–	–
2011	Calgary Roughnecks	6	9:33	0	0	2	12.57	4	0.667	2	0:00	0	0	0	0.00	0	0.000
		137	6,261:01	53	53	1,306	12.52	4,075	0.757	9	322:36	3	2	77	14.32	219	0.740
Career Total:		146	6,583:37	56	55	1,383	12.60	4,294	0.756								

GP–Games played;Min–Minutes played;W–Wins;L–Losses;GA–Goals against;GAA–Goals against average;Sv–Number of saves;Sv %–Save percentage;

== Awards ==
Preceded by Bob Watson	Champion's Cup MVP; 2004	Succeeded by Colin Doyle
