= Calgary Roughnecks =

NLL professional box lacrosse team

- Sport: Box lacrosse
- Founded: 2002
- League: National Lacrosse League
- Location: Calgary, Alberta
- Arena: Scotiabank Saddledome
- Colours: Black, White, Grey, Red
- Owner: Calgary Sports and Entertainment
- Head coach: Josh Sanderson
- General manager: Mike Board
- League titles: 3 (2004, 2009, 2019)
- Division titles: 5 (2005, 2009, 2011, 2012, 2013)
- Local media: FAN 960
- Website: calgaryroughnecks.com

The Calgary Roughnecks are a Canadian professional box lacrosse team based in Calgary, Alberta, that competes in the National Lacrosse League (NLL). The team plays its home games at Scotiabank Saddledome. The team name is derived from the roughnecks who work drilling rigs in Alberta's oil and gas industry. The team is affectionately known by fans as the Riggers.

The Roughnecks were founded in 2001, their first season was 2002, and they have qualified for the post-season every year from 2003 to 2016. They have won three division championships (2005, 2009, 2011) and have captured the NLL Cup as NLL champions three times. Calgary won all three titles on their home floor, defeating the Buffalo Bandits in 2004, the New York Titans in 2009, and the Bandits again in 2019.

== History ==
=== Team beginnings ===
The National Lacrosse League announced on March 28, 2001, that it had awarded an expansion franchise to a group of four owners led by Brad Banister. The idea for the team was formed a year earlier during Calgary's famous Canada Day lacrosse tournament where it was suggested that professional lacrosse could work in Calgary. Within eight weeks of Banister contacting the league, Calgary was announced as the tenth franchise in the NLL at a cost of $500,000. The new team did not immediately announce its nickname, though Banister stated it would relate to the oilpatch. The name was later announced as the "Roughnecks", named after workers on an oil rig.

Kevin Melnyk was installed as the coach and general manager, but as the season approached, Banister felt that the team was in danger of not being prepared for the season, replaced Melnyk. He took over as general manager, and hired Chris Hall to be the coach. The pair sought to build a more veteran team that is typical for an expansion franchise, and traded their first draft pick, Blaine Manning, to the Toronto Rock for Calgary native Kaleb Toth, who was expected to be the team's marquee player.

The team made its debut on November 24, 2001, against the Montreal Express, a fellow expansion team. The Roughnecks lost the game 32–17 in front of 9,517 fans. The score shattered league records for total goals in a game with 49, and Montreal set a new mark for goals by one team. Another loss to the Express followed five days later before the Roughnecks earned their first win in franchise history on December 2 with a 17–11 defeat on the road versus the Ottawa Rebel. The Roughnecks then won three of their next four games, including their first home win on December 14, against the Columbus Landsharks. The team lost its last nine games, however, to finish with a 4–12 record.

=== First championship ===
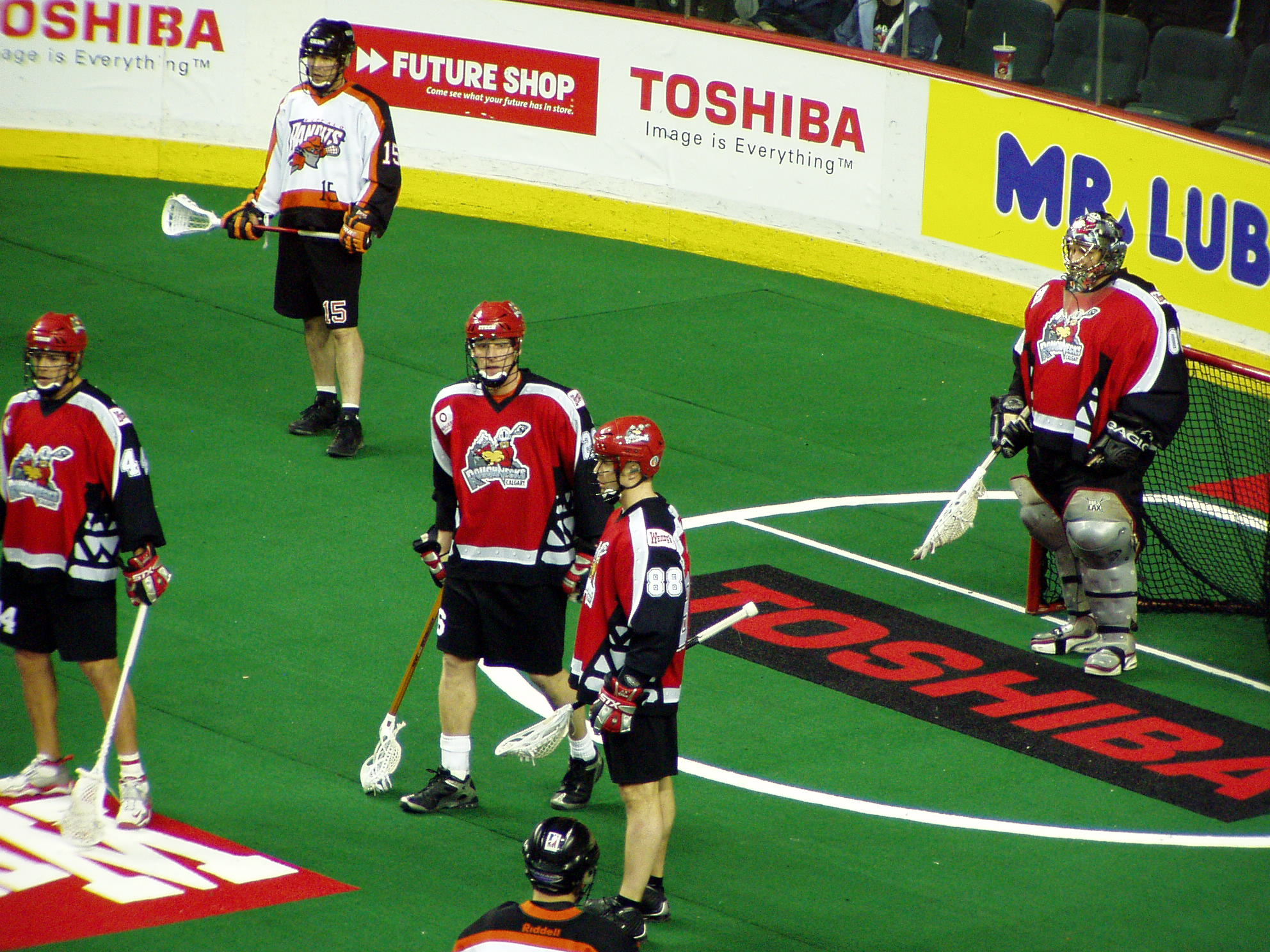
Calgary Roughnecks in 2005

In the 2002-2003 season, the Roughnecks enhanced their record to 9-7, with a very successful 6-2 record at home. Leading the team with 63 points was Tracey Kelusky. Close behind him was Kaleb Toth with 61 points. Before the season started Brad Banister promised the fans the playoffs and they were successful in achieving this goal. They travelled to Buffalo for the first playoff game in franchise history. The team lost 16-9 against the Buffalo Bandits to get knocked out of the playoffs.

The Roughnecks continued their improvement in the 2003-2004 season with a record of 10-6. Lewis Ratcliff lead the team with 71 points. Tracey Kelusky finished second with 69. Again Banister predicted a playoff entry and this time he predicted a home game to boot. Finishing third in the West the only way to get a home playoff game was to meet the third place team from the East. In the playoffs, the Roughnecks beat the San Jose Stealth 15-14 on the road to advance to the conference final. Again on the road, the Roughnecks beat the Colorado Mammoth with a final score of 13-11. On May 7, 2004, the Roughnecks hosted the championship game against the Buffalo Bandits, who had knocked them out of the playoff the previous year. Calgary won the Champion's Cup by beating the Bandits 14-11 in front of a home crowd of 19,289 in the Pengrowth Saddledome.

For the 2004-2005 season former Roughneck player and assistant coach Dave Bremner was hired as general manager.

The Roughnecks hosted the 2005 NLL All Star Game on February 26, 2005. This was the first NLL game televised nationally in the United States; it was broadcast on NBC. Roughnecks' captain Kelusky took home the Most Valuable Player award as the East beat the West in an 11-10 overtime win. The 2005 season saw the Roughnecks come in first place in the Western Conference for the first time in franchise history. This garnered them a bye in the first round of the playoffs. On April 30, they hosted the Arizona Sting for the conference title and lost with a score of 19-15.

=== Second championship ===
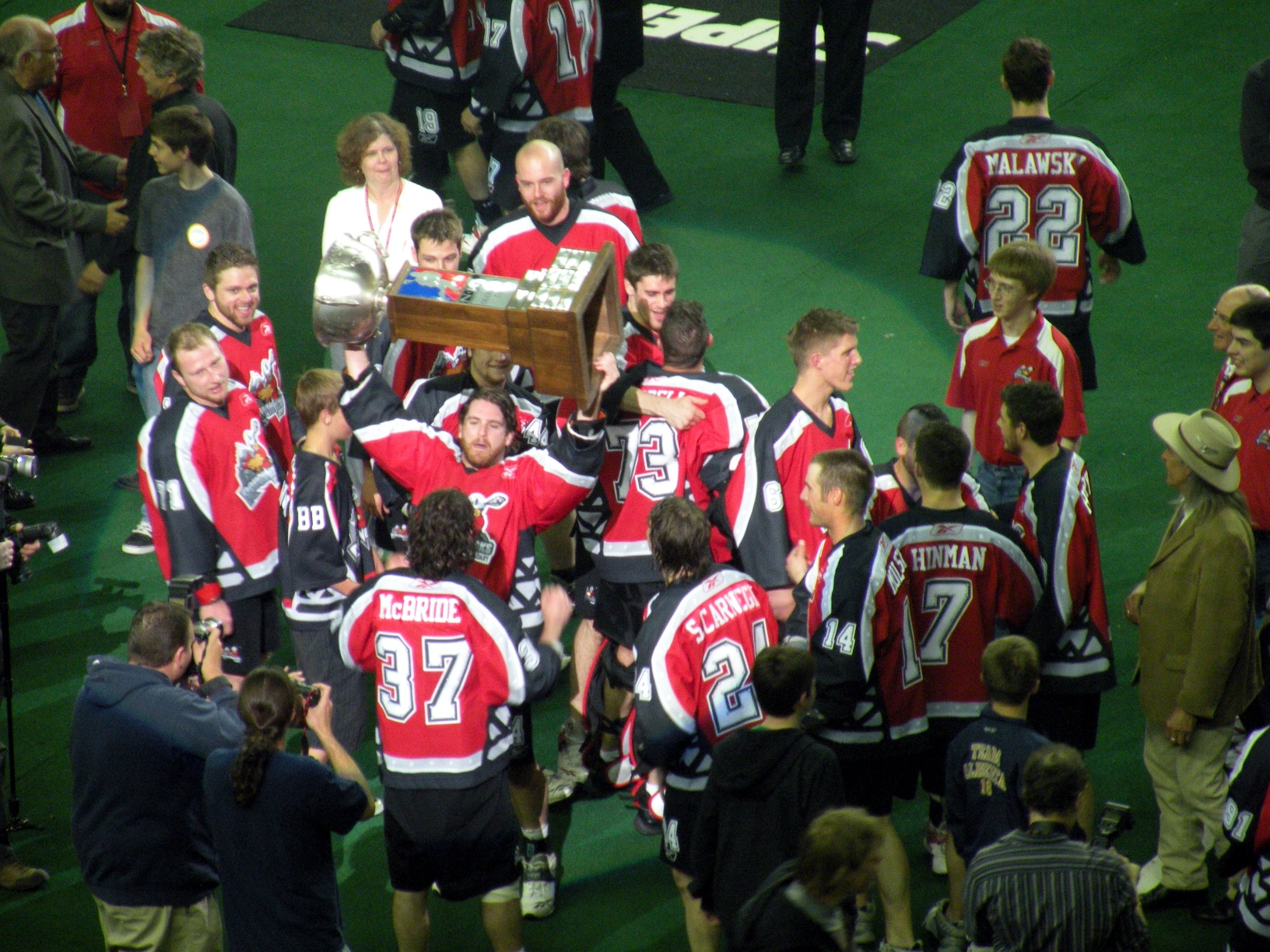
Devan Wray hoists the Champion's Cup as the Roughnecks celebrate the 2009 championship.

Prior to the 2005-2006 season the Roughnecks hired on former Buffalo GM Kurt Silcott to replace Dave Bremner and become the fourth GM in team history.

After beginning the 2007 NLL season 4-1, the Roughnecks lost three straight games, and Silcott fired the only head coach in Roughnecks history, Chris Hall. Silcott filled in as interim head coach for one game, and then hired former Roughnecks player Jeff Dowling as the second head coach in Roughnecks history on March 9, 2007. He was replaced as Head Coach for the 2008 season by Troy Cordingley, while former Toronto Rock Head Coach Terry Sanderson was added as Assistant Coach.

In 2008, Calgary finished 3rd in the West with a 7-9 record, beat Colorado in the division semi-final, but lost in the division final to the Portland LumberJax. Despite this relatively successful season, general manager Kurt Silcott was fired. Team President Brad Banister gave no reason for the firing other than to say that "the team and Silcott are heading into different directions, and this move would allow both parties to succeed to their full potential" and that he would take over as interim GM.

The 2009 season was the most successful in team history. After opening the year with a record five straight wins, the Roughnecks finished the season 12-4. This allowed Calgary to take first overall in the NLL for the first time ever. They would go on to defeat the Colorado Mammoth and San Jose Stealth in the playoffs and then triumph over the New York Titans 12-10 in the Champion's Cup final to win their first NLL championship since 2004.

=== New ownership ===
Banister announced shortly before the 2011 season began that he had placed the team for sale. He had talks with the National Hockey League's (NHL) Calgary Flames, who indicated at the time they were not interested in the team. Midway through the season, Banister announced that he was late in meeting payroll and that the team was in danger of folding during the season. In a press release, he made an impassioned plea for the city's business community to step forward and save the team.

The announcement touched off several weeks of speculation about the team, its future, and the potential for the Flames to purchase the team. On the floor, the team shrugged off the team's instability, finishing with the best record in the NLL at 11–5. As they were set to face the Colorado Mammoth in the West semi-final, Banister put out another plea to the fans for support in the playoff game, threatening to turn the West final, which Calgary would have had the right to host, to their opponent for the game. The Roughnecks defeated the Mammoth, and played the West final at home, but were eliminated by the Washington Stealth in an upset by a 10–8 score.

The team's future was settled in the off-season, as Banister announced on June 14, 2011, that the Flames had purchased the team, becoming the third NHL franchise to operate an NLL team after the Mammoth and Bandits. As part of the deal, it was announced that Banister would assist in the team's transition period, and was replaced as general manager by former Calgary Herald writer and Flames employee Mike Board.

=== Third championship ===
The 2019 season was up and down for the Roughnecks and they finished the season 10-8. However, they ended it on a winning streak and then upset the suddenly-slumping San Diego Seals in the opening round by a score of 12-11 in San Diego. They then faced the Colorado Mammoth, who had similarly upset the defending champion Saskatchewan Rush and defeated them 8-4 in the West Final in Calgary in one of the lowest-scoring playoff games in NLL history.

This set them up for a best-of-three series against the Buffalo Bandits, which the Roughnecks swept with a 10-7 victory in Game 1 in Buffalo on May 18, and a 14-13 victory in an overtime thriller in Game 2 in Calgary on May 25. Rhys Duch scored the overtime winning goal.

== Mascot ==
Howie, the honey badger, is the team's official mascot. The Roughnecks introduced the new mascot at a media event on January 26, 2012, and later unveiled the name after holding a naming contest. The team's former mascot is Derrick, an oilpatch rigger. Derrick has since returned as a secondary mascot at games.

== Current roster ==
Calgary Roughnecks roster
Active (21-man) roster		Inactive roster	Coaches
Goaltenders: 34 (Canada) Cam MacLeod; 88 (Canada) Aden Walsh; Defencemen: 6 (Canada) Griffen Hall; 10 (Canada) Brayden Laity; 11 (Canada) Tyler Hendrycks; 14 (Canada) Matt Sykes; 18 (Canada) Harrison Matsuoka; 21 (Canada) Bennett Smith; 23 (Canada) Liam LeClair; 30 (Canada) Justin Inacio; 33 (Canada) Kyle Pepper; 45 (Canada) Jack Follows; 83 (Canada) Carter Cook	Forwards: 7 (Canada) Noah Manning; 12 (Canada) Tanner Cook; 20 (Canada) Mathieu Gautier; 55 (Canada) Brayden Mayea; 68 (Canada) Tyler Pace; 89 (Canada) Riley Loewen; 97 (Canada) Haiden Dickson; Transition: 13 (Canada) Eli Salama (C); 18 (Canada) Harrison Matsuoka; 29 (Canada) Riley Isaacs	Practice squad: 1 (Canada) Colby Bowman; 4 (Canada) Brett McIntyre; 48 (Canada) Justin Morgan	Head coach: Josh Sanderson; Assistant coaches: Troy Cordingley; Shawn Cable; Legend: * Suspended list; (C) Captain; (A) Alternate captain; updated 2025-12-13; NLL Transactions

== All-time record ==
Season	Division/Conference (Note: Conference play began in the 2022 season)	W–L	Finish	Home	Road	GF	GA	Coach	Playoffs
2002	Northern	4–12	3rd	2–6	2–6	224	264	Chris Hall	Did not qualify
2003	Northern	9–7	2nd	6–2	3–5	209	207	Chris Hall	Lost division Semi-Final
2004	Western	10–6	3rd	4–4	6–2	214	187	Chris Hall	NLL Champions
2005	Western	10–6	1st	6–2	4–4	216	208	Chris Hall	Lost division Final
2006	Western	9–7	3rd	4–4	5–3	183	178	Chris Hall	Lost division Semi-Final
2007	Western	9–7	2nd	4–4	5–3	219	202	Chris Hall / Jeff Dowling	Lost division Semi-Final
2008	Western	7–9	3rd	5–3	2–6	183	178	Troy Cordingley	Lost division final
2009	Western	12–4	1st	5–3	7–1	206	167	Troy Cordingley	NLL Champions
2010	Western	10–6	2nd	5–3	5–3	193	169	Dave Pym	Lost division Semi-Final
2011	Western	11–5	1st	6–2	5–3	198	181	Dave Pym	Lost division Final
2012	Western	12–4	1st	5–3	7–1	216	170	Dave Pym	Lost division Semi-Final
2013	Western	9–7	1st	3–5	6–2	222	211	Curt Malawsky	Lost division Final
2014	Western	12–6	2nd	6–3	6–3	237	215	Curt Malawsky	Lost Championship Final
2015	Western	7–11	3rd	4–5	3–6	212	217	Curt Malawsky	Lost division Final
2016	Western	8–10	3rd	5–4	3–6	216	216	Curt Malawsky	Lost division Final
2017	Western	8–10	4th	5–4	3–6	212	220	Curt Malawsky	Did not qualify
2018	Western	8–10	3rd	5–4	3–6	227	211	Curt Malawsky	Lost division Final
2019	Western	10–8	3rd	5–4	5–4	212	201	Curt Malawsky	NLL Champions
2020	Western	5–5	4th	1–4	4–1	122	111	Curt Malawsky	No playoffs held
2021	Western	Season cancelled due to COVID-19 pandemic							
2022	Western	10–8	2nd	6–3	4–5	194	201	Curt Malawsky	Lost Conference Semi-Final
2023	Western	13–5	2nd	7–2	6–3	218	167	Curt Malawsky	Lost Conference Final
2024	Unified	8–10	11th	6–3	2–7	198	194	Josh Sanderson	Did not qualify
2025	Unified	10–8	6th	3–6	7–2	219	209	Josh Sanderson	Lost Quarterfinals
2026	Unified	6–12	11th	3–6	3–6	187	205	Josh Sanderson	Did not qualify
Total	24 seasons	217–183		111–89	106–94	4,937	4,689		
Playoff totals	18 Appearances	19–21		12–10	7–11	440	435	3 championships	

== Playoff results ==
Season	Game	Visiting	Home
2003	Quarterfinals	Calgary 9	Buffalo 16
2004	Division Semifinal	Calgary 15	San Jose 14
2004	Division Final	Calgary 13	Colorado 11
2004	Championship	Buffalo 11	Calgary 14
2005	Division Final	Arizona 19	Calgary 15
2006	Division Semifinal	Calgary 17	Colorado 18
2007	Division Semifinal	Arizona 13	Calgary 9
2008	Division Semifinal	Calgary 15	Colorado 13
2008	Division Final	Portland 16	Calgary 12
2009	Division Semifinal	Colorado 8	Calgary 15
2009	Division Final	San Jose 5	Calgary 17
2009	Championship	New York 10	Calgary 12
2010	Division Semifinal	Edmonton 11	Calgary 7
2011	Division Semifinal	Colorado 6	Calgary 10
2011	Division Final	Washington 10	Calgary 8
2012	Division Semifinal	Edmonton 19	Calgary 11
2013	Division Semifinal	Colorado 10	Calgary 15
2013	Division Final	Washington 14	Calgary 13
2014	Division Semifinal	Colorado 15	Calgary 16 (OT)
2014	Division Final (Game 1)	Edmonton 11	Calgary 12 (OT)
2014	Division Final (Game 2)	Calgary 13	Edmonton 15
2014	Division Final (Mini-game)	Calgary 2	Edmonton 1
2014	Championship (Game 1)	Rochester 7	Calgary 10
2014	Championship (Game 2)	Calgary 10	Rochester 16
2014	Championship (Mini-game)	Calgary 2	Rochester 3
2015	Division Semifinal	Colorado 6	Calgary 11
2015	Division Final (Game 1)	Calgary 6	Edmonton 10
2015	Division Final (Game 2)	Edmonton 9	Calgary 12
2015	Division Final (Mini-game)	Edmonton 4	Calgary 1
2016	Division Semifinal	Calgary 11(OT)	Colorado 10
2016	Division Final (Game 1)	Saskatchewan 16	Calgary 10
2016	Division Final (Game 2)	Calgary 9	Saskatchewan 12
2019	Division Semifinal	Calgary 12	San Diego 11
2019	Division Final	Colorado 4	Calgary 8
2019	Championship (Game 1)	Calgary 10	Buffalo 7
2019	Championship (Game 2)	Buffalo 13	Calgary 14(OT)
2022	Western Conference Semifinals	Colorado 16	Calgary 12
2023	Western Conference Semifinals	Panther City 9	Calgary 12
2023	Western Conference Finals Game 1	Calgary 7	Colorado 8
2023	Western Conference Finals Game 2	Colorado 12	Calgary 13
2023	Western Conference Finals Game 3	Colorado 9	Calgary 7
2025	Quarterfinals	Calgary 12	Halifax 16

== Awards and honours ==
Award	Winner	Season
Most Valuable Player	Jeff Shattler	2011
Most Valuable Player	Shawn Evans	2013
Most Valuable Player	Shawn Evans	2015
Most Valuable Player	Dane Dobbie	2019
Most Valuable Player	Christian Del Bianco	2023
Rookie of the Year	Taylor Wray	2004
Rookie of the Year	Curtis Dickson	2011
Defensive Player of the Year	Taylor Wray (co-winner)	2004
Transition Player of the Year	Jeff Shattler	2011
Transition Player of the Year	Zach Currier	2022
Transition Player of the Year	Zach Currier	2023
Goaltender of the Year	Mike Poulin	2012
Goaltender of the Year	Christian Del Bianco	2023
Sportsman of the Year	Tracy Kelusky	2007
Les Bartley Award; Coach of the Year	Troy Cordingley	2009
Les Bartley Award; Coach of the Year	Curt Malawsky	2023
Executive of the Year	Brad Banister	2003
Executive of the Year	John Bean	2014
Champion's Cup Most Valuable Player	Curtis Palidwor	2004
Champion's Cup Most Valuable Player	Josh Sanderson	2009
Champion's Cup Most Valuable Player	Dane Dobbie	2019

== Head coaching history ==
#	Name	Term	Regular season				Playoffs			
#	Name	Term	GC	W	L	W%	GC	W	L	W%
1	Chris Hall	2002-2007	88	46	42	.523	6	3	3	.500
2	Kurt Silcott	2007	1	1	0	1.000	-	-	-	-
3	Jeff Dowling	2007	8	4	3	.571	1	0	1	.000
4	Troy Cordingley	2008-2009	32	19	13	.594	5	4	1	.800
5	Dave Pym	2010-2012	48	33	15	.688	4	1	3	.250
6	Curt Malawsky	2013-2023	170	90	80	.529	25	14	11	.560
6	Josh Sanderson	2024–	54	24	30	.444	1	0	1	.000

== Hall of Famers ==
- Steve Dietrich (Class of 2012)
- Chris Hall (Class of 2014)
- Tracy Kelusky (Class of 2016)
- Josh Sanderson (Class of 2016)

== See also ==
- Calgary Roughnecks seasons

== Notes ==
Preceded by Toronto Rock	National Lacrosse League Champions; 2004	Succeeded by Toronto Rock
Preceded by Buffalo Bandits	National Lacrosse League Champions; 2009	Succeeded by Washington Stealth
