= Gavin Prout =

Canadian lacrosse player (born 1978)

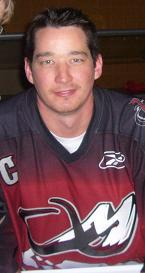

Personal information
- Born: March 13, 1978 (age 48) Whitby, Ontario, Canada
- Height: 5 ft 10 in (178 cm)
- Weight: 188 lb (85 kg; 13 st 6 lb)

Sport
- Position: Forward
- Shoots: Right
- NCAA team: Loyola (2001)
- NLL draft: 1st overall, 2001; New York Saints
- NLL team Former teams: Colorado Mammoth; Edmonton Rush; Rochester Knighthawks; New York Saints
- MLL team Former teams: Free Agent; Hamilton Nationals; Rochester Rattlers; Baltimore Bayhawks
- Pro career: 2002–2013

Gavin Prout (born March 13, 1978, in Whitby, Ontario) is a Canadian former professional box lacrosse player. He was inducted into the Canadian Lacrosse hall of fame in 2023.

He is the current general manager of the Brooklin Lacrosse Club of Major Series Lacrosse. He was also a member of the Team Canada squad that won the gold medal during the 2006 World Lacrosse Championship.

== Canadian Box career ==
=== Junior ===
Prout played for the Whitby Warriors of the OLA Junior A Lacrosse League. In 1997, Prout lead the Warriors to their first Minto Cup championship in 12 years. The following year, Prout was awarded the "Green Gael Trophy" for League M.V.P., scoring 49 goals and 125 points during the season. In 1999, Prout led the league in scoring with a career high 132 points, and led the Warriors to their second Minto Cup in three years. Prout was also given the "Dean McLeod Award" for Playoffs M.V.P. and the "B.W. Evans Award" for Top Graduating Player.

Prout finished his junior career with an outstanding 676 points (regular season and playoffs combined), ranking him 25th all time in Canadian Junior A lacrosse history. Prout is also ranked 21st all time in combined assists with 396.

=== Senior ===
Prout finished his first season in the MSL with 73 points, and helped the Brooklin Redmen to their first Mann Cup in ten years. Prout was awarded the "Gene Dopp Memorial Trophy" as Rookie of the Year.

== College career ==
Prout started his collegiate career in Erie, PA playing at Mercyhurst College as a freshman until they dropped Men's Lacrosse as a Division 1 sport and Gannon University as a sophomore, until they also dropped Men's Lacrosse as a division 1 sport. Prout played collegiate lacrosse at Loyola College in Maryland, where he was named to the First-team All-American team as a senior.

== Professional career ==
Prout was drafted first overall by the New York Saints in the 2001 National Lacrosse League entry draft.

As a rookie, Prout was named to the All-Rookie team as a member of the Saints. Since joining the league, Prout has played in six NLL All-Star Games (2002, & 2004 - 2008).

Prout joined the Mammoth in 2004, and was named the captain of the Mammoth prior to the 2006 season. He was named the Championship game MVP when the Mammoth won the NLL championship in 2006.

In 2008, Prout led the National Lacrosse League in assists with 67, a career high. During the 2009 NLL season, he was named a reserve to the All-Star game.

In October 2009, Prout was traded along with Andrew Potter and two 2010 1st round draft selections to the Rochester Knighthawks for Ilija Gajic and their 2012 first round draft selection. Just two weeks later, Prout was once again traded with Dean Hill to the Edmonton Rush for two draft picks.

In March 2011, after playing a season and a half for Edmonton, Prout was traded back to the Mammoth.

== Statistics ==
=== NCAA ===
| Season | Team | GP | G | A | Pts |
|---|---|---|---|---|---|
| 1998 | Mercyhurst College | 12 | 6 | 7 | 13 |
| 1999 | Gannon University | 15 | 47 | 40 | 87 |
| 2000 | Loyola University | 14 | 42 | 11 | 53 |
| 2001 | Loyola University | 14 | 37 | 21 | 58 |
| Totals | | 55 | 132 | 79 | 211 |

=== MLL ===
| | | Regular Season | | | | | | | Playoffs |
| Season | Team | GP | G | 2ptG | A | Pts | LB | PIM | GP | G | 2ptG | A | Pts | LB | PIM |
|---|---|---|---|---|---|---|---|---|---|---|---|---|---|---|---|
| 2005 | Baltimore | 11 | 13 | 0 | 14 | 27 | 33 | 8 | 2 | 1 | 0 | 2 | 3 | 0 | 0 |
| 2007 | Rochester | 10 | 16 | 0 | 5 | 21 | 14 | 6.5 | 1 | 2 | 0 | 1 | 3 | 2 | 1 |
| 2008 | Rochester | 12 | 7 | 0 | 10 | 17 | 18 | 5 | 2 | 2 | 0 | 1 | 3 | 1 | 1 |
| 2009 | Toronto | 10 | 3 | 0 | 7 | 10 | 8 | 3 | 2 | 0 | 0 | 1 | 1 | 2 | 1.5 |
| MLL Totals | | 43 | 39 | 0 | 36 | 75 | 73 | 22.5 | 7 | 5 | 0 | 5 | 10 | 5 | 3.5 |

=== NLL ===
| Gavin Prout | | Regular season | | | | | | | | | Playoffs | | | | | | | | |
| Season | Team | GP | G | A | Pts | LB | PIM | Pts/GP | LB/GP | PIM/GP | GP | G | A | Pts | LB | PIM | Pts/GP | LB/GP | PIM/GP |
|---|---|---|---|---|---|---|---|---|---|---|---|---|---|---|---|---|---|---|---|
| 2002 | New York Saints | 16 | 30 | 52 | 82 | 115 | 33 | 5.13 | 7.19 | 2.06 | – | – | – | – | – | – | – | – | – |
| 2003 | New York Saints | 15 | 28 | 44 | 72 | 131 | 29 | 4.80 | 8.73 | 1.93 | – | – | – | – | – | – | – | – | – |
| 2004 | Colorado Mammoth | 16 | 34 | 57 | 91 | 107 | 33 | 5.69 | 6.69 | 2.06 | 1 | 1 | 2 | 3 | 5 | 2 | 3.00 | 5.00 | 2.00 |
| 2005 | Colorado Mammoth | 16 | 28 | 50 | 78 | 80 | 32 | 4.88 | 5.00 | 2.00 | 1 | 1 | 1 | 2 | 7 | 0 | 2.00 | 7.00 | 0.00 |
| 2006 | Colorado Mammoth | 16 | 29 | 64 | 93 | 89 | 42 | 5.81 | 5.56 | 2.63 | 3 | 10 | 15 | 25 | 20 | 0 | 8.33 | 6.67 | 0.00 |
| 2007 | Colorado Mammoth | 16 | 30 | 59 | 89 | 85 | 32 | 5.56 | 5.31 | 2.00 | 1 | 1 | 3 | 4 | 6 | 2 | 4.00 | 6.00 | 2.00 |
| 2008 | Colorado Mammoth | 16 | 25 | 67 | 92 | 85 | 14 | 5.75 | 5.31 | 0.88 | 1 | 2 | 4 | 6 | 4 | 0 | 6.00 | 4.00 | 0.00 |
| 2009 | Colorado Mammoth | 16 | 26 | 48 | 74 | 96 | 14 | 4.63 | 6.00 | 0.88 | 1 | 2 | 3 | 5 | 6 | 2 | 5.00 | 6.00 | 2.00 |
| 2010 | Edmonton Rush | 16 | 27 | 40 | 67 | 72 | 29 | 4.19 | 4.50 | 1.81 | 2 | 4 | 6 | 10 | 7 | 4 | 5.00 | 3.50 | 2.00 |
| 2011 | Edmonton Rush | 10 | 11 | 26 | 37 | 41 | 16 | 3.70 | 4.10 | 1.60 | – | – | – | – | – | – | – | – | – |
| 2011 | Colorado Mammoth | 6 | 3 | 20 | 23 | 23 | 7 | 3.83 | 3.83 | 1.17 | 1 | 0 | 2 | 2 | 4 | 0 | 2.00 | 4.00 | 0.00 |
| 2012 | Colorado Mammoth | 14 | 22 | 61 | 83 | 49 | 26 | 5.93 | 3.50 | 1.86 | 1 | 1 | 3 | 4 | 4 | 2 | 4.00 | 4.00 | 2.00 |
| 2013 | Colorado Mammoth | 11 | 8 | 33 | 41 | 33 | 9 | 3.73 | 3.00 | 0.82 | – | – | – | – | – | – | – | – | – |
| | | 184 | 301 | 621 | 922 | 1,006 | 316 | 5.01 | 5.47 | 1.72 | 12 | 22 | 39 | 61 | 63 | 12 | 5.08 | 5.25 | 1.00 |
| Career Total: | | 196 | 323 | 660 | 983 | 1,069 | 328 | 5.02 | 5.45 | 1.67 | | | | | | | | | |

GP–Games played; G–Goals; A–Assists; Pts–Points; LB–Loose balls; PIM–Penalty minutes; Pts/GP–Points per games played; LB/GP–Loose balls per games played; PIM/GP–Penalty minutes per games played.

=== O.L.A. Jr.A ===
| | | | Regular Season | | | | | Playoffs |
| Season | Team | League | GP | G | A | Pts | PIM | GP | G | A | Pts | PIM |
|---|---|---|---|---|---|---|---|---|---|---|---|---|
| 1995 | Oshawa Green Gaels | OLA Jr.B | 2 | 4 | 2 | 6 | 10 | 0 | 0 | 0 | 0 | 0 |
| 1995 | Whitby Warriors | OLA Jr.A | 16 | 18 | 15 | 33 | 39 | 10 | 3 | 6 | 9 | 33 |
| 1996 | Whitby Warriors | OLA Jr.A | 18 | 32 | 51 | 83 | 16 | 12 | 16 | 26 | 42 | 36 |
| 1997 | Whitby Warriors | OLA Jr.A | 18 | 44 | 53 | 97 | 50 | 17 | 23 | 31 | 54 | 41 |
| Minto Cup | Whitby Warriors | CLA | -- | -- | -- | -- | -- | 6 | 4 | 11 | 15 | 20 |
| 1998 | Whitby Warriors | OLA Jr.A | 20 | 49 | 76 | 125 | 44 | 12 | 24 | 27 | 51 | 20 |
| 1999 | Whitby Warriors | OLA Jr.A | 20 | 49 | 82 | 132 | 44 | 13 | 25 | 35 | 60 | 50 |
| Minto Cup | Whitby Warriors | CLA | -- | -- | -- | -- | -- | 5 | 7 | 18 | 25 | 14 |
| Junior A Totals | | | 92 | 192 | 277 | 469 | 193 | 64 | 91 | 125 | 216 | 180 |
| Junior B Totals | | | 2 | 4 | 2 | 6 | 10 | 0 | 0 | 0 | 0 | 0 |
| Minto Cup Totals | | | -- | -- | -- | -- | -- | 11 | 11 | 29 | 40 | 34 |

=== MSL ===
| | | | Regular Season | | | | | Playoffs |
| Season | Team | League | GP | G | A | Pts | PIM | GP | G | A | Pts | PIM |
|---|---|---|---|---|---|---|---|---|---|---|---|---|
| 1997 | Brooklin Redmen | MSL | 1 | 2 | 1 | 3 | 0 | 0 | 0 | 0 | 0 | 0 |
| 1998 | Brooklin Redmen | MSL | 0 | 0 | 0 | 0 | 0 | 3 | 8 | 9 | 17 | 30 |
| 2000 | Brooklin Redmen | MSL | 18 | 26 | 47 | 73 | 40 | 11 | 12 | 31 | 43 | 15 |
| Mann Cup | Brooklin Redmen | CLA | -- | -- | -- | -- | -- | 4 | 8 | 10 | 18 | 4 |
| 2003 | Brooklin Redmen | MSL | 12 | 22 | 26 | 48 | 26 | 8 | 17 | 31 | 48 | 10 |
| 2004 | Brooklin Redmen | MSL | 13 | 27 | 65 | 92 | 30 | 4 | 9 | 10 | 19 | 16 |
| 2006 | Brooklin Redmen | MSL | 11 | 22 | 31 | 53 | 14 | 7 | 11 | 24 | 35 | 17 |
| 2007 | Brooklin Redmen | MSL | 8 | 11 | 22 | 33 | 25 | -- | -- | -- | -- | -- |
| Senior A Totals | | | 63 | 110 | 192 | 302 | 193 | 33 | 57 | 105 | 162 | 88 |
| Mann Cup Totals | | | -- | -- | -- | -- | -- | 4 | 8 | 10 | 18 | 4 |

== Awards ==
| Preceded by Colin Doyle | Champion's Cup MVP; 2006 | Succeeded by John Grant, Jr. |
