= Anthony Cosmo (lacrosse) =

Canadian lacrosse player

Personal information
- Nickname: Coz
- Born: October 6, 1977 (age 48) Mississauga, Ontario, Canada
- Height: 6 ft 2 in (188 cm)
- Weight: 205 lb (93 kg; 14 st 9 lb)

Sport
- Position: Goaltender
- Shoots: Left
- NLL draft: 15th overall, 1998; Rochester Knighthawks
- NLL teams: Boston Blazers; San Jose Stealth; Toronto Rock; Buffalo Bandits
- MSL team: Brampton Excelsiors (MSL)
- Pro career: 2001–2017

Anthony Cosmo (born October 6, 1977) is a Canadian former professional box lacrosse goaltender and current goaltending coach in the National Lacrosse League. Cosmo is a three-time NLL All-Star, and was named NLL Goaltender of the Year in 2007. Cosmo also plays for the Brampton Excelsiors (MSL) Major Series Lacrosse Senior A Men's league.

Cosmo began his lacrosse career with the Junior A Mississauga Tomahawks of the Ontario Lacrosse Association. He then went on to play for the Burnaby Lakers of the BC Junior A Lacrosse League. In 1998, playing with fellow stars Cam Sedgwick and Kaleb Toth, Cosmo and the Lakers won the Minto Cup.

Cosmo then went on to play for the Victoria Shamrocks of the Western Lacrosse Association. On September 16, 2005, the Shamrocks won their eighth Mann Cup, and he was named the series' Most Valuable Player.

Since the 2018-19 National Lacrosse League season, Cosmo has served as the goaltending coach for the NLL's Buffalo Bandits, the team with which he ended his playing career.

== National Lacrosse League career ==
In 2001, he made his NLL debut with the Toronto Rock, where he played for four seasons as a backup goaltender. On July 27, 2004, Cosmo was traded to San Jose in a six-player blockbuster trade. He continued to succeed as a starter for the Stealth, and was selected as the starting goaltender for the Western Division in both the 2005 and 2006 National Lacrosse League All-Star Game.

In 2009 Cosmo finished fifth in the league with a 12.28 goals against average (GAA). During 2006, Cosmo's 10.38 GAA was the third best in the league, and his save percentage was sixth best in the league. 2007 was Cosmo's best career season, leading the league in both GAA (10.22) and save percentage (.792). For his performance, Cosmo was named the Progressive Goaltender of the Year award for the 2007 season.

Cosmo was traded to the Chicago Shamrox for Matt Roik and two first-round draft picks. However, shortly before the 2009 season began, the Shamrox suspended operations, and a dispersal draft was held. Cosmo was selected first overall by the expansion Boston Blazers. During the 2009 NLL season, he was named a reserve to the All-Star game.

After three seasons, the Boston Blazers announced that they would not be participating in the 2012 NLL season, and a dispersal draft was held. Cosmo was selected third overall by the Minnesota Swarm. Cosmo never reported to the Swarm, and five games into the 2012 season he was traded to the Buffalo Bandits for two first-round draft picks.

== Statistics ==
=== NLL ===
Anthony Cosmo		Regular Season								Playoffs							
Season	Team	GP	Min	W	L	GA	GAA	Sv	Sv %	GP	Min	W	L	GA	GAA	Sv	Sv %
2001	Toronto Rock	5	132:10	1	1	19	8.63	69	0.784	1	0:00	0	0	0	0.00	0	0.000
2002	Toronto Rock	16	255:33	2	2	45	10.57	170	0.791	2	0:00	0	0	0	0.00	0	0.000
2003	Toronto Rock	16	359:12	5	1	61	10.19	226	0.787	2	0:00	0	0	0	0.00	0	0.000
2004	Toronto Rock	16	392:26	5	1	68	10.40	222	0.766	1	37:23	0	1	11	17.65	18	0.621
2005	San Jose Stealth	15	698:45	3	9	143	12.28	427	0.749	–	–	–	–	–	–	–	–
2006	San Jose Stealth	13	688:05	5	7	119	10.38	420	0.779	–	–	–	–	–	–	–	–
2007	San Jose Stealth	15	810:00	8	5	138	10.22	524	0.792	2	106:39	1	1	20	11.25	63	0.759
2008	San Jose Stealth	16	824:56	7	6	147	10.69	571	0.795	1	60:00	0	1	18	18.00	40	0.690
2009	Boston Blazers	15	0:00	0	0	0	0.00	0	0.000	1	59:59	0	1	10	10.00	35	0.778
2010	Boston Blazers	15	890:18	7	6	141	9.50	559	0.799	1	60:00	0	1	12	12.00	37	0.755
2011	Boston Blazers	16	913:08	8	7	147	9.66	484	0.767	1	60:00	0	1	11	11.00	29	0.725
2012	Buffalo Bandits	9	382:02	3	3	79	12.41	249	0.759	1	60:00	0	1	7	7.00	48	0.873
2013	Buffalo Bandits	14	628:21	4	4	140	13.37	423	0.751	–	–	–	–	–	–	–	–
2014	Buffalo Bandits	18	1,063:36	8	9	191	10.77	752	0.797	3	180:00	2	1	34	11.33	107	0.759
2015	Buffalo Bandits	17	1,013:41	10	7	191	11.31	681	0.781	1	59:29	0	1	14	14.12	41	0.745
2016	Buffalo Bandits	15	711:00	8	2	139	11.73	501	0.783	4	240:00	2	2	47	11.75	164	0.777
2017	Buffalo Bandits	14	583:01	5	6	132	13.58	437	0.768	–	–	–	–	–	–	–	–
		245	10,346:14	89	76	1,900	11.02	6,715	0.779	21	923:30	5	11	184	11.95	582	0.760
Career Total:		266	11,269:44	94	87	2,084	11.10	7,297	0.778								

GP–Games played;Min–Minutes played;W–Wins;L–Losses;GA–Goals against;GAA–Goals against average;Sv–Number of saves;Sv %–Save percentage;

== Awards ==
Preceded by Steve Dietrich	NLL Goaltender of the Year; 2007	Succeeded by Bob Watson
Preceded by unknown	Mississauga's Pro Athlete of the Year; 2008	Succeeded by incumbent
