= Mike Miron =

Canadian lacrosse player

Personal information
- Nickname: Tiny
- Nationality: Canadian
- Born: September 11, 1980 (age 45) Capreol, Ontario
- Height: 5 ft 10 in (178 cm)

Sport
- Position: Goaltender
- NLL draft: 17th overall, 2001; Columbus Landsharks
- NLL teams: Rochester Knighthawks; Arizona Sting; Columbus Landsharks
- Pro career: 2002–

Mike Miron (born September 11, 1980, in Capreol, Ontario) is a former professional box lacrosse goaltender. In the National Lacrosse League he was a member of the Rochester Knighthawks, Arizona Sting, and the Columbus Landsharks.

Mike Miron's Statistics
		Regular Season						Playoffs
Season	Team	GP	Min	GA	Sv	GAA	Sv %	GP	Min	GA	Sv	GAA	Sv %
2002	Columbus	14	424	109	319	15.44	74.53%	--	--	--	--	--	--
2003	Columbus	16	802	165	508	12.34	75.48%	--	--	--	--	--	--
2004	Arizona	16	905	188	572	12.46	75.26%	--	--	--	--	--	--
2005	Arizona	15	765	169	481	13.25	74.00%	3	176	45	113	15.34	71.52%
2006	Arizona	7	338	70	201	12.42	74.17%	1	0	0	0	0.00	0.00%
2007	Rochester	6	50	15	31	17.95	67.39%	--	--	--	--	--	--
NLL totals		74	3,285	716	2,112	13.08	74.68%	4	176	45	113	15.34	71.52%
