= Gord Nash =

Canadian lacrosse player

Personal information
- Nickname: Gee
- Nationality: Canadian
- Born: January 17, 1978 (age 48) Ajax, Ontario
- Height: 6 ft 0 in (183 cm)
- Weight: 195 lb (88 kg; 13 st 13 lb)

Sport
- Position: Goaltender
- Shoots: Left
- NLL draft: 2nd overall, 1999; New York Saints
- NLL team Former teams: Toronto Rock; Colorado Mammoth; New York Saints
- Pro career: 2000–2009

Gordon "Gee" Nash (born January 17, 1978, in Ajax, Ontario) is a Canadian former professional box lacrosse goaltender, who last played with the Toronto Rock of the National Lacrosse League. Nash played four seasons with the New York Saints before they disbanded after the 2003 NLL season. He was subsequently signed by the Colorado Mammoth, where he played six seasons before retiring in 2009. Nash was named NLL Goaltender of the Year in 2004.

== Statistics ==
=== NLL ===
Gord Nash		Regular Season								Playoffs							
Season	Team	GP	Min	W	L	GA	GAA	Sv	Sv %	GP	Min	W	L	GA	GAA	Sv	Sv %
2000	New York Saints	8	305:14	1	4	80	15.73	210	0.724	–	–	–	–	–	–	–	–
2001	New York Saints	14	807:16	6	6	168	12.49	571	0.773	–	–	–	–	–	–	–	–
2002	New York Saints	16	800:11	5	8	190	14.25	512	0.729	–	–	–	–	–	–	–	–
2003	New York Saints	16	823:34	3	10	202	14.72	597	0.747	–	–	–	–	–	–	–	–
2004	Colorado Mammoth	16	803:13	11	3	143	10.68	539	0.790	1	74:07	0	1	13	10.52	31	0.705
2005	Colorado Mammoth	16	940:41	8	8	175	11.16	601	0.774	1	60:00	0	1	16	16.00	37	0.698
2006	Colorado Mammoth	15	670:51	6	3	115	10.29	425	0.787	3	156:26	2	0	33	12.66	108	0.766
2007	Colorado Mammoth	16	681:29	9	0	128	11.27	452	0.779	1	29:41	0	0	9	18.19	18	0.667
2008	Colorado Mammoth	16	640:24	7	4	112	10.49	366	0.766	1	59:58	0	1	14	14.01	37	0.725
2009	Colorado Mammoth	3	106:44	1	1	24	13.49	55	0.696	–	–	–	–	–	–	–	–
2011	Toronto Rock	2	0:00	0	0	0	0.00	0	0.000	–	–	–	–	–	–	–	–
		138	6,579:37	57	47	1,337	12.19	4,328	0.764	7	380:12	2	3	85	13.41	231	0.731
Career Total:		145	6,959:49	59	50	1,422	12.26	4,559	0.762								

GP–Games played;Min–Minutes played;W–Wins;L–Losses;GA–Goals against;GAA–Goals against average;Sv–Number of saves;Sv %–Save percentage;

== Awards ==
Preceded by Pat O'Toole	NLL Goaltender of the Year; 2004	Succeeded by Steve Dietrich
