= Steve Dietrich =

Canadian lacrosse GM and player

Personal information
- Nickname: Chugger
- Nationality: Canadian
- Born: February 18, 1970 (age 56) Kitchener, Ontario
- Height: 5 ft 9 in (175 cm)
- Weight: 250 lb (110 kg; 17 st 12 lb)

Sport
- Position: Goaltender
- Shoots: Right
- NLL teams: Calgary Roughnecks; Buffalo Bandits; Rochester Knighthawks; Detroit Turbos; Baltimore Thunder; Toronto Rock
- Pro career: 1992–2009

Career highlights
- 4x NLL champion (1997, 2023–2025); 2x NLL Goaltender of the Year Award (2005, 2006); NLL MVP (2006); 2x NLL GM of the Year Award (2019, 2022)

Steve "Chugger" Dietrich (born February 18, 1970, in Kitchener, Ontario) is the general manager of the Buffalo Bandits of the National Lacrosse League. Dietrich is also a NLL Hall of Fame goaltender who played for the Calgary Roughnecks, Buffalo Bandits, Rochester Knighthawks, Detroit Turbos, Baltimore Thunder, and Toronto Rock.

== Professional career ==
Dietrich played six seasons with each of the Bandits and Knighthawks. He led the Bandits to the NLL Championship game twice, in 2004 and 2006, and also won the Championship with the Knighthawks in 1997, when he was named Championship game MVP. He was named NLL Goaltender of the Year in both 2005 and 2006, and was the first goaltender to be named NLL MVP in 2006.

On November 22, 2010, Dietrich announced his retirement as a player in the NLL to become the Toronto Rock's goaltending coach.

In July 2012, Dietrich was announced as the new general manager of the Buffalo Bandits, after Darris Kilgour was relieved of that title earlier in the month.

On July 30, 2012, Dietrich was elected in the NLL Hall of Fame. Dietrich was the leading vote-getter, appearing on 79% of all ballots cast. The induction ceremony was held on October 2, 2012.

== Statistics ==
=== NLL ===
Steve Dietrich		Regular Season								Playoffs							
Season	Team	GP	Min	W	L	GA	GAA	Sv	Sv %	GP	Min	W	L	GA	GAA	Sv	Sv %
1992	Baltimore Thunder	8	305:00	0	0	89	17.51	205	0.697	1	0:00	0	0	0	0.00	0	0.000
1994	Detroit Turbos	7	372:00	0	0	64	10.32	219	0.774	1	60:00	0	1	16	16.00	42	0.724
1995	Rochester Knighthawks	8	455:00	0	0	90	11.87	322	0.782	2	121:00	1	1	23	11.40	81	0.779
1996	Rochester Knighthawks	10	505:00	0	0	116	13.78	377	0.765	1	58:00	0	0	16	16.55	42	0.724
1997	Rochester Knighthawks	10	597:03	5	5	132	13.27	396	0.750	2	120:00	2	0	25	12.50	93	0.788
1998	Rochester Knighthawks	8	464:00	5	3	91	11.77	320	0.779	1	55:00	0	1	13	14.18	46	0.780
1999	Rochester Knighthawks	3	124:00	0	2	33	15.97	87	0.725	–	–	–	–	–	–	–	–
2000	Rochester Knighthawks	3	98:25	0	2	25	15.24	52	0.675	2	0:00	0	0	0	0.00	0	0.000
2001	Rochester Knighthawks	9	287:17	2	2	61	12.74	195	0.762	–	–	–	–	–	–	–	–
2002	Buffalo Bandits	16	845:07	7	7	174	12.35	586	0.771	–	–	–	–	–	–	–	–
2003	Buffalo Bandits	16	838:09	11	3	162	11.60	480	0.748	1	0:00	0	0	0	0.00	0	0.000
2004	Buffalo Bandits	12	483:17	5	4	91	11.30	313	0.775	3	174:09	2	1	32	11.02	129	0.801
2005	Buffalo Bandits	15	749:43	9	4	137	10.96	511	0.789	1	45:07	0	1	15	19.95	21	0.583
2006	Buffalo Bandits	15	812:34	10	4	135	9.97	568	0.808	3	162:13	2	0	34	12.58	127	0.789
2007	Buffalo Bandits	9	431:22	5	2	83	11.54	290	0.777	–	–	–	–	–	–	–	–
2008	Calgary Roughnecks	6	332:24	3	2	58	10.47	189	0.765	2	114:12	1	1	27	14.19	62	0.697
2009	Edmonton Rush	7	295:45	1	4	69	14.00	198	0.742	–	–	–	–	–	–	–	–
2009	Toronto Rock	3	48:39	0	1	11	13.57	44	0.800	–	–	–	–	–	–	–	–
2010	Toronto Rock	7	296:46	2	3	48	9.70	162	0.771	1	3:07	0	0	2	38.50	0	0.000
		172	8,341:31	65	48	1,669	12.01	5,514	0.768	21	912:48	8	6	203	13.34	643	0.760
Career Total:		193	9,254:19	73	54	1,872	12.14	6,157	0.767								

GP–Games played;Min–Minutes played;W–Wins;L–Losses;GA–Goals against;GAA–Goals against average;Sv–Number of saves;Sv %–Save percentage;

Preceded by Pat O'Toole	MILL Championship game MVP; 1997	Succeeded by Dallas Eliuk
Preceded by Colin Doyle	NLL Most Valuable Player; 2006	Succeeded by John Grant, Jr.
Preceded by Gord Nash	NLL Goaltender of the Year; 2005, 2006	Succeeded by Anthony Cosmo
Preceded by Curt Styres; Paul Day	NLL GM of the Year; 2019, 2022	Succeeded by Paul Day; Dan Carey
