= Pat O'Toole =

Canadian lacrosse player and coach

Personal information
- Nickname: Toole Time
- Born: December 24, 1971 (age 54) Toronto, ON, CAN
- Height: 6 ft 0 in (183 cm)
- Weight: 220 lb (100 kg; 15 st 10 lb)

Sport
- Position: Goaltender
- Shoots: Right
- NLL teams: Rochester Knighthawks; Buffalo Bandits; New York Saints
- Pro career: 1995–2010

Patrick "Toole Time" O'Toole (born December 24, 1971, in Toronto, Ontario) is a Canadian professional box lacrosse coach and former player who most recently served as an assistant coach for the Rochester Knighthawks in the National Lacrosse League. O'Toole was named NLL Goaltender of the Year in 2003.

In 1998, as a member of the Brampton Excelsiors, O'Toole was awarded the Mike Kelly Memorial Trophy as most valuable player in the Mann Cup competition.

In 2010, O'Toole became the NLL all-time saves leader with 6,464.

He is one of the 2022 inductee list for the Brampton Sports Hall of Fame.

== Statistics ==
=== NLL ===
		Regular Season						Playoffs
Season	Team	GP	Min	GA	Sv	GAA	Sv %	GP	Min	GA	Sv	GAA	Sv %
1995	New York	5	39	7	28	10.77	80.00%	–	–	–	–	–	–
1996	Buffalo	10	566	113	375	11.98	76.84%	2	120	20	75	10.00	78.95%
1997	Buffalo	8	189	53	96	16.80	64.43%	2	0	0	0	0.00	0.00%
1998	Buffalo	8	369	78	211	12.68	73.01%	1	57	15	40	15.79	72.73%
1999	Rochester	8	357	65	221	10.92	77.27%	2	119	25	71	12.61	73.96%
2000	Rochester	12	621	124	418	11.99	77.12%	2	120	25	83	12.50	76.85%
2001	Rochester	13	555	98	384	10.59	79.67%	1	60	12	42	12.00	77.78%
2002	Rochester	16	849	180	572	12.72	76.06%	2	110	18	66	9.86	78.57%
2003	Rochester	16	841	143	515	10.21	78.27%	2	120	21	75	10.50	78.13%
2004	Rochester	16	910	175	515	11.54	74.64%	1	60	13	36	13.00	73.47%
2005	Rochester	16	908	168	579	11.11	77.51%	2	118	26	72	13.27	73.47%
2006	Rochester	16	927	169	598	10.93	77.97%	2	118	23	68	11.69	74.73%
2007	Rochester	16	838	165	566	11.81	77.43%	3	179	30	131	10.08	81.37%
2008	Rochester	16	889	156	540	10.53	77.59%	–	–	–	–	--	–
2009	Rochester	16	776	139	475	10.74	77.36%	1	62	11	43	10.62	79.63
2010	Rochester	16	650	122	371	11.26	75.25%	–	–	–	–	--	–
NLL totals		204	10,285	1,955	6,464	11.40	76.78%	23	1,242	239	802	11.55	77.04%

Note: GP = Games played; Min = Minutes played; GA = Goals-against; GAA = Goals-against average; Sv = Shots saved; SV% = Save percentage;

== Awards ==
Preceded by Gary Gait	MILL Championship game MVP; 1996	Succeeded by Steve Dietrich
Preceded by Rob Blasdell	NLL Goaltender of the Year; 2003	Succeeded by Gord Nash
