= 2027 Buffalo Bandits season =

Lacrosse team season

2027 Buffalo Bandits
- League: NLL
- General Manager: Steve Dietrich
- Coach: John Tavares
- Captain: Steve Priolo
- Alternate captains: Dhane Smith, Nick Weiss
- Arena: KeyBank Center

The Buffalo Bandits are a professional box lacrosse team based in Buffalo, New York playing in the National Lacrosse League (NLL). The 2027 season will be their 35th season in the NLL. This season will mark the first year without longtime goaltender Matt Vinc, who announced his retirement on August 20, 2026.

== Regular season ==
NLL Standings Reference:

P	Team	GP	W	L	PCT	GB	Home	Road	GF	GA	Diff	GF/GP	GA/GP
1	Oshawa FireWolves	0	0	0	.000	0.0	0–0	0–0	0	0	−-0	0.00	0.00
2	Buffalo Bandits	0	0	0	.000	0.0	0–0	0–0	0	0	−-0	0.00	0.00
3	Calgary Roughnecks	0	0	0	.000	0.0	0–0	0–0	0	0	−-0	0.00	0.00
4	Colorado Mammoth	0	0	0	.000	0.0	0–0	0–0	0	0	−-0	0.00	0.00
5	Georgia Swarm	0	0	0	.000	0.0	0–0	0–0	0	0	−-0	0.00	0.00
6	Halifax Thunderbirds	0	0	0	.000	0.0	0–0	0–0	0	0	−-0	0.00	0.00
7	Las Vegas Desert Dogs	0	0	0	.000	0.0	0–0	0–0	0	0	−-0	0.00	0.00
8	Rochester Knighthawks	0	0	0	.000	0.0	0–0	0–0	0	0	−-0	0.00	0.00
9	San Diego Seals	0	0	0	.000	0.0	0–0	0–0	0	0	−-0	0.00	0.00
10	Saskatchewan Rush	0	0	0	.000	0.0	0–0	0–0	0	0	−-0	0.00	0.00
11	Toronto Rock	0	0	0	.000	0.0	0–0	0–0	0	0	−-0	0.00	0.00
12	Vancouver Warriors	0	0	0	.000	0.0	0–0	0–0	0	0	−-0	0.00	0.00

== Game log ==
The Bandits' schedule was released on September 22, 2026.

Game	Date	Opponent	Location	Score	OT	Attendance	Record
1	November 28, 2026	Georgia Swarm	KeyBank Center				
2	December 19, 2026	@ Halifax Thunderbirds	Scotiabank Centre				
3	December 27, 2026	Toronto Rock	KeyBank Center				
4	January 2, 2027	Vancouver Warriors	KeyBank Center				
5	January 9, 2027	@ Georgia Swarm	Gas South Arena				
6	January 23, 2027	San Diego Seals	KeyBank Center				
7	January 30, 2027	@ Las Vegas Desert Dogs	Lee's Family Forum				
8	February 5, 2027	@ Toronto Rock	TD Coliseum				
9	February 20, 2027	Halifax Thunderbirds	KeyBank Center				
10	March 6, 2027	@ San Diego Seals	Frontwave Arena				
11	March 13, 2027	Colorado Mammoth	KeyBank Center				
12	March 19, 2027	@ Vancouver Warriors	Rogers Arena				
13	March 20, 2027	@ Saskatchewan Rush	SaskTel Centre				
14	March 27, 2027	Oshawa FireWolves	KeyBank Center				
15	April 3, 2027	Rochester Knighthawks	KeyBank Center				
16	April 10, 2027	@ Rochester Knighthawks	Blue Cross Arena				
17	April 17, 2027	@ Oshawa FireWolves	Tribute Communities Centre				
18	April 24, 2027	Calgary Roughnecks	KeyBank Center				

== Current roster ==
Buffalo Bandits roster
Active (21-man) roster		Inactive roster	Coaches
Goaltenders: 46 (Canada) Evan Constantopoulos; 48 (Canada) Matt Vinc; Defensemen: 77 (United States) Zack Belter; 93 (Canada) Carter Coffey; 6 (Canada) Paul Dawson; 12 (Canada) Mitch de Snoo; 44 (Canada) Tyler Hendrycks; 23 (Canada) Steve Priolo (C); 8 (Canada) Dylan Robinson; 25 (Canada) Matt Spanger; 5 (Canada) Cam Wyers	Forwards: 91 (Canada) Kyle Buchanan; 22 (Canada) Josh Byrne; 1 (Haudenosaunee) Tehoka Nanticoke; 15 (United States) Joe Resetarits; 81 (Haudenosaunee) Clay Scanlan; 92 (Canada) Dhane Smith (A); Transition: 41 (United States) Connor Farrell; 4 (Canada) Ian MacKay; 26 (Canada) Mike McCannell; 20 (Canada) Nick Weiss (A); 3 (Canada) Thomas Whitty	Practice squad: 19 (Canada) Taylor Dooley; 00 (Haudenosaunee) Waukiigan Shognosh; 87 (Canada) Coltrane Tyson; Unable to play: 94 (Canada) Bryce Sweeting	Head coach John Tavares Assistant coaches: Anthony Cosmo; Steve Dietrich; Eric Vinc; Legend: * Suspended list; (C) Captain; (A) Alternate captain; Roster updated 2026-3-21; NLL Transactions

== Dispersal Draft ==
On September 10, 2026, the NLL announced that the league would undergo a dispersal draft, with the franchise terminations of the Ottawa Black Bears and the Philadelphia Wings, bringing the league down to 12 teams. The 2026 NLL Disperal Draft was held on September 15, 2026. The Bandits' selections are listed below.

Round	Overall	Position	Player	Notes
1	9	Goaltender	Zach Higgins	Selected from Ottawa
1	11	Transition	Dalton Young	Selected from Philadelphia (trade with Vancouver)
2	21	Forward	Larson Sundown	Selected from Ottawa
2	23	Transiton	Scott Dominey	Selected from Philadelphia (trade with Vancouver)
3	27	Forward	Travis Longboat	Selected from Philadelphia (trade with Rochester)
3	33	Forward	Justin Sykes	Selected from Ottawa

== Entry Draft ==
The 2026 NLL Entry Draft was held on September 24, 2026. The Bandits' selections are listed below.

Round	Overall	Player	College/Club	Notes
1	6	Dante Bowen	Syracuse Orange (NCAA Division I)	
1	16	Traded to Vancouver (Note: The Bandits traded Luca Antongiovanni and the 16th overall selection in the 2026 Entry Draft to the Vancouver Warriors in exchange for Payton Cormier, and the 11th and 23rd overall selections in the 2026 NLL dispersal draft.)		
2	21	Owen Rice	Kahnawake Hunters (Ontario Junior B Lacrosse League)	from San Diego
3	41	Obrigh Tallchief	D'Youville University Saints (East Coast Conference)	from Toronto
4	48	Ray Cortes	D'Youville University Saints (East Coast Conference)	
5	57	Micah Hanson	Canisius Golden Griffins (Metro Conference)	
6	64	Kyle Gonsiorek	Jacksonville Dolphins (Atlantic Sun Conference)	from Philadelphia via Calgary
6	65	Nate Ruff	Robert Morris Colonials (NCAA Division I)	from Oshawa via Calgary
6	74	Nikhil Lowe (Note: This pick was made posthumously to honor Lowe's memory, as he died on September 10, 2026, at the age of 20 after a battle with cancer.)	Brampton Excelsiors (Ontario Junior B Lacrosse League)	from Vancouver
