= 2026 Buffalo Bandits season =

Lacrosse team season

2026 Buffalo Bandits
- League: NLL
- 2026 record: 11–7
- Home record: 6–3
- Road record: 5–4
- Goals for: 199
- Goals against: 183
- General Manager: Steve Dietrich
- Coach: John Tavares
- Captain: Steve Priolo
- Alternate captains: Dhane Smith, Nick Weiss
- Arena: KeyBank Center
- Average attendance: 18,290

Team leaders
- Goals: Dhane Smith (39)
- Assists: Dhane Smith (79)
- Points: Dhane Smith (118)
- Penalties in minutes: Nick Weiss (36)
- Loose Balls: Mitch de Snoo (144)
- Wins: Matt Vinc (11)
- Goals against average: Matt Vinc (9.85)

The Buffalo Bandits are a professional box lacrosse team based in Buffalo, New York playing in the National Lacrosse League (NLL). The 2026 season was their 34th season in the NLL.

The Bandits entered the season as the defending champions for the third straight year, and attempted to become the first team in league history to win four straight NLL championships.

Buffalo finished the season with an 11–7 record, earning the fifth seed in the playoffs following a 4–6 start to the season. However, the Bandits fell in the single-elimination Quarterfinal round of the playoffs to the Georgia Swarm. The playoff defeat marked the first time since 2018 where the Bandits did not reach the NLL Finals.

== Regular season ==
NLL Standings Reference:

P	Team	GP	W	L	PCT	GB	Home	Road	GF	GA	Diff	GF/GP	GA/GP
1	Vancouver Warriors – xz	18	13	5	.722	0.0	6–3	7–2	200	170	+30	11.11	9.44
2	Colorado Mammoth – x	18	12	6	.667	1.0	7–2	5–4	206	179	+27	11.44	9.94
3	Saskatchewan Rush – x	18	12	6	.667	1.0	7–2	5–4	206	176	+30	11.44	9.78
4	Georgia Swarm – x	18	12	6	.667	1.0	5–4	7–2	193	156	+37	10.72	8.67
5	Buffalo Bandits – x	18	11	7	.611	2.0	6–3	5–4	199	183	+16	11.06	10.17
6	Toronto Rock – x	18	11	7	.611	2.0	6–3	5–4	195	186	+9	10.83	10.33
7	San Diego Seals – x	18	8	10	.444	5.0	3–6	5–4	185	191	−6	10.28	10.61
8	Halifax Thunderbirds – x	18	8	10	.444	5.0	4–5	4–5	187	182	+5	10.39	10.11
9	Las Vegas Desert Dogs	18	8	10	.444	5.0	6–3	2–7	219	229	−10	12.17	12.72
10	Ottawa Black Bears	18	8	10	.444	5.0	4–5	4–5	185	203	−18	10.28	11.28
11	Calgary Roughnecks	18	6	12	.333	7.0	3–6	3–6	187	205	−18	10.39	11.39
12	Rochester Knighthawks	18	6	12	.333	7.0	3–6	3–6	205	239	−34	11.39	13.28
13	Oshawa FireWolves	18	6	12	.333	7.0	4–5	2–7	179	212	−33	9.94	11.78
14	Philadelphia Wings	18	5	13	.278	8.0	3–6	2–7	165	200	−35	9.17	11.11

== Game log ==
The Bandits' schedule was released on September 19, 2025. The team's home opener was announced by the league on September 12.

=== Regular season ===
Game	Date	Opponent	Location	Score	OT	Attendance	Record
1	November 29, 2025	Georgia Swarm	KeyBank Center	W 15–11		19,070	1–0
2	December 13, 2025	Halifax Thunderbirds	KeyBank Center	L 8–9	OT	17,192	1–1
3	December 28, 2025	@ Calgary Roughnecks	Scotiabank Saddledome	W 13–7		11,715	2–1
4	January 3, 2026	Las Vegas Desert Dogs	KeyBank Center	W 15–13		19,070	3–1
5	January 10, 2026	@ Rochester Knighthawks	Blue Cross Arena	L 9–12		8,546	3–2
6	January 16, 2026	Ottawa Black Bears	KeyBank Center	L 9–10		17,190	3–3
7	January 31, 2026	@ Colorado Mammoth	Ball Arena	L 9–20		9,114	3–4
8	February 7, 2026	Philadelphia Wings	KeyBank Center	L 11–13		19,070	3–5
9	February 14, 2026	@ Halifax Thunderbirds	Scotiabank Centre	W 11–10		10,595	4–5
10	February 20, 2026	@ Vancouver Warriors	Rogers Arena	L 9–11		9,392	4–6
11	February 27, 2026	Saskatchewan Rush	KeyBank Center	W 11–10	OT	17,595	5–6
12	February 28, 2026	@ Toronto Rock	TD Coliseum	W 14–9		8,960	6–6
13	March 13, 2026	Colorado Mammoth	KeyBank Center	W 13–10		19,070	7–6
14	March 21, 2026	@ San Diego Seals	Pechanga Arena	W 9–8	OT	6,034	8–6
15	March 28, 2026	@ Saskatchewan Rush	SaskTel Centre	W 8–7		7,063	9–6
16	April 4, 2026	Vancouver Warriors	KeyBank Center	W 15–5		17,350	10–6
17	April 11, 2026	Rochester Knighthawks	KeyBank Center	W 12–6		19,070	11–6
18	April 18, 2026	@ Oshawa FireWolves	Tribute Communities Centre	L 8–12		6,018	11–7

=== Playoffs ===
Game	Date	Opponent	Location	Score	OT	Attendance	Record
NLL Quarterfinals	April 25, 2026	@ Georgia Swarm	Gas South Arena	L 10–17		4,134	0–1

== Current roster ==
Buffalo Bandits roster
Active (21-man) roster		Inactive roster	Coaches
Goaltenders: 46 (Canada) Evan Constantopoulos; 48 (Canada) Matt Vinc; Defensemen: 77 (United States) Zack Belter; 93 (Canada) Carter Coffey; 6 (Canada) Paul Dawson; 12 (Canada) Mitch de Snoo; 44 (Canada) Tyler Hendrycks; 23 (Canada) Steve Priolo (C); 8 (Canada) Dylan Robinson; 25 (Canada) Matt Spanger; 5 (Canada) Cam Wyers	Forwards: 91 (Canada) Kyle Buchanan; 22 (Canada) Josh Byrne; 1 (Haudenosaunee) Tehoka Nanticoke; 15 (United States) Joe Resetarits; 81 (Haudenosaunee) Clay Scanlan; 92 (Canada) Dhane Smith (A); Transition: 41 (United States) Connor Farrell; 4 (Canada) Ian MacKay; 26 (Canada) Mike McCannell; 20 (Canada) Nick Weiss (A); 3 (Canada) Thomas Whitty	Practice squad: 19 (Canada) Taylor Dooley; 00 (Haudenosaunee) Waukiigan Shognosh; 87 (Canada) Coltrane Tyson; Unable to play: 94 (Canada) Bryce Sweeting	Head coach John Tavares Assistant coaches: Anthony Cosmo; Steve Dietrich; Eric Vinc; Legend: * Suspended list; (C) Captain; (A) Alternate captain; Roster updated 2026-3-21; NLL Transactions

== Entry Draft ==
The 2025 NLL Entry Draft was held on September 6, 2025. The Bandits' selections are listed below.

Round	Overall	Player	College/Club	Notes
1	14	Waukiigan Shognosh	Peterborough Lakers Jr. A (OLA Junior A Lacrosse)	
2	21	Coltrane Tyson	UMass Minutemen (NCAA) / Brampton Excelsiors (MSL)	from Philadelphia
2	32	Jimmy Freehill	Denver Pioneers (NCAA)	
3	39	Carter Coffey	Orangeville Northmen Jr. A (OLA Junior A Lacrosse)	from Ottawa
4	61	Jaden Kennedy	Onondaga Community College (NJCAA) / Seneca WarChiefs (First Nations Junior B Lacrosse League)	
5	74	David Burr	Robert Morris Colonials (NCAA)	from Saskatchewan
5	75	Liam Keane	Robert Morris Colonials (NCAA)	
6	89	Traded to the Philadelphia Wings (Note: The Bandits traded their sixth round selection to the Philadelphia Wings in exchange for a sixth round selection in the 2027 NLL Entry Draft.)		

== Player stats ==
= Indicates team leader

=== Runners (Top 10) ===
Player	GP	G	A	Pts	LB	PIM
Dhane Smith	18	39	79	118	86	6
Josh Byrne	18	36	77	113	64	8
Ian MacKay	16	24	34	58	82	28
Kyle Buchanan	18	29	26	55	71	2
Tehoka Nanticoke	16	21	16	37	39	23
Clay Scanlan	17	11	11	22	60	0
Ryan Benesch	8	8	10	18	9	2
Steve Priolo	18	6	12	18	98	31
Nick Weiss	15	5	13	18	110	36
Joe Resetarits	6	9	6	15	15	0
Totals		199	331	550	1,300	223

=== Goaltenders ===
Player	GP	MIN	W	L	GA	Sv%	GAA
Matt Vinc	18	1,054:11	11	7	173	.791	9.85
Evan Constantopoulos	12	36:25	0	0	9	.710	14.83
Steven Orleman	6	0:36	0	0	1	.000	100.00
Totals		1,091:12	11	7	183	.787	10.06
