= 2024 Buffalo Bandits season =

Lacrosse team season; NLL champions, sixth in team history

2024 Buffalo Bandits
- NLL Champions
- League: NLL
- 2024 record: 11–7
- Home record: 6–3
- Road record: 5–4
- Goals for: 237
- Goals against: 212
- General Manager: Steve Dietrich
- Coach: John Tavares
- Captain: Steve Priolo
- Alternate captains: Dhane Smith, Nick Weiss
- Arena: KeyBank Center
- Average attendance: 16,974

Team leaders
- Goals: Josh Byrne (53)
- Assists: Dhane Smith (101)
- Points: Josh Byrne (135)
- Penalties in minutes: Nick Weiss (31)
- Loose Balls: Ian MacKay (160)
- Wins: Matt Vinc (11)
- Goals against average: Steven Orleman (10.42)

The Buffalo Bandits are a lacrosse team based in Buffalo, New York playing in the National Lacrosse League (NLL). The 2024 season was their 32nd season in the NLL.

The Bandits finished the regular season with an 11-7 record and the 4th seed in the playoffs. Buffalo beat the Georgia Swarm, 10-9, in the quarterfinals in overtime. The Bandits would go on to sweep the Toronto Rock in 2 games to advance to their 4th straight NLL Finals appearance. In the Finals, Buffalo swept the Albany FireWolves in 2 games to repeat as NLL Champions for the first time since the 1992 and 1993 seasons.

== Regular season ==
NLL Standings Reference:

P	Team	GP	W	L	PCT	GB	Home	Road	GF	GA	Diff	GF/GP	GA/GP
1	Toronto Rock – xz	18	15	3	.833	0.0	7–2	8–1	218	169	+49	12.11	9.39
2	San Diego Seals – x	18	13	5	.722	2.0	8–1	5–4	210	178	+32	11.67	9.89
3	Albany FireWolves – x	18	11	7	.611	4.0	5–4	6–3	206	191	+15	11.44	10.61
4	Buffalo Bandits – x	18	11	7	.611	4.0	6–3	5–4	237	212	+25	13.17	11.78
5	Georgia Swarm – x	18	10	8	.556	5.0	6–3	4–5	198	197	+1	11.00	10.94
6	Halifax Thunderbirds – x	18	10	8	.556	5.0	6–3	4–5	228	200	+28	12.67	11.11
7	Panther City Lacrosse Club – x	18	9	9	.500	6.0	5–4	4–5	205	202	+3	11.39	11.22
8	Rochester Knighthawks – x	18	8	10	.444	7.0	4–5	4–5	214	226	−12	11.89	12.56
9	New York Riptide	18	8	10	.444	7.0	4–5	4–5	206	234	−28	11.44	13.00
10	Saskatchewan Rush	18	8	10	.444	7.0	4–5	4–5	217	210	+7	12.06	11.67
11	Calgary Roughnecks	18	8	10	.444	7.0	6–3	2–7	198	194	+4	11.00	10.78
12	Vancouver Warriors	18	8	10	.444	7.0	5–4	3–6	202	211	−9	11.22	11.72
13	Philadelphia Wings	18	6	12	.333	9.0	1–8	5–4	198	233	−35	11.00	12.94
14	Las Vegas Desert Dogs	18	5	13	.278	10.0	2–7	3–6	176	223	−47	9.78	12.39
15	Colorado Mammoth	18	5	13	.278	10.0	4–5	1–8	193	226	−33	10.72	12.56

== Game log ==
Game	Date	Opponent	Location	Score	OT	Attendance	Record
1	December 9, 2023	@ Albany FireWolves	MVP Arena	L 13–17		3,406	0–1
2	December 16, 2023	San Diego Seals	KeyBank Center	W 12–9		17,200	1–1
3	December 29, 2023	Georgia Swarm	KeyBank Center	L 8–9		16,763	1–2
4	January 6, 2024	Colorado Mammoth	KeyBank Center	W 12–8		15,147	2–2
5	January 13, 2024	@ Rochester Knighthawks	Blue Cross Arena	W 15–13		8,167	3–2
6	January 19, 2024	New York Riptide	KeyBank Center	L 13–15		14,440	3–3
7	January 27, 2024	@ Toronto Rock	FirstOntario Centre	W 16–14		8,586	4–3
8	February 3, 2024	Rochester Knighthawks	KeyBank Center	W 15–14		17,135	5–3
9	February 16, 2024	@ Halifax Thunderbirds	Scotiabank Centre	L 12–14		7,824	5–4
10	February 24, 2024	Albany FireWolves	KeyBank Center	L 10–13		17,953	5–5
11	March 1, 2024	@ Vancouver Warriors	Rogers Arena	L 12–13		10,355	5–6
12	March 8, 2024	Saskatchewan Rush	KeyBank Center	W 15–14	OT	16,596	6–6
13	March 16, 2024	Toronto Rock	KeyBank Center	W 14–12		18,463	7–6
14	March 22, 2024	@ Panther City Lacrosse Club	Dickies Arena	L 11–12	OT	3,045	7–7
15	March 30, 2024	@ Philadelphia Wings	Wells Fargo Center	W 18–12		8,182	8–7
16	April 5, 2024	@ Colorado Mammoth	Ball Arena	W 13–11		11,252	9–7
17	April 13, 2024	Calgary Roughnecks	KeyBank Center	W 14–7		19,070	10–7
18	April 20, 2024	@ Las Vegas Desert Dogs	Michelob Ultra Arena	W 14–5		6,051	11–7

=== Playoffs ===
Game	Date	Opponent	Location	Score	OT	Attendance	Record
NLL Quarterfinals	April 27, 2024	Georgia Swarm	KeyBank Center	W 10–9	OT	17,865	1–0
NLL Semifinals (Game 1)	May 3, 2024	@ Toronto Rock	FirstOntario Centre	W 12–4		7,130	2–0
NLL Semifinals (Game 2)	May 5, 2024	Toronto Rock	KeyBank Center	W 10–8		16,312	3–0
NLL Finals (Game 1)	May 17, 2024	@ Albany FireWolves	MVP Arena	W 12–8		5,032	4–0
NLL Finals (Game 2)	May 18, 2024	Albany FireWolves	KeyBank Center	W 15–13		19,070	5–0

== Roster ==
Buffalo Bandits roster
Active (21-man) roster		Inactive roster	Coaches
Goaltenders: 30 (Canada) Devlin Shanahan; 48 (Canada) Matt Vinc; Defensemen: 8 (Canada) Dylan Robinson; 15 (Canada) Adam Bomberry; 21 (Canada) Justin Martin; 23 (Canada) Steve Priolo (C); 25 (Canada) Matt Spanger; 37 (Canada) Ethan O'Connor; 53 (Canada) Justin Robinson; 94 (Canada) Bryce Sweeting	Forwards: 1 (Haudenosaunee) Tehoka Nanticoke; 2 (Canada) Chris Cloutier; 10 (Canada) Brad McCulley; 12 (Canada) Sam La Roue; 22 (Canada) Josh Byrne; 73 (Canada) Brandon Robinson; 91 (Canada) Kyle Buchanan; 92 (Canada) Dhane Smith (A); 95 (Canada) Chase Fraser; Transition: 4 (Canada) Ian MacKay; 6 (United States) Max Adler; 20 (Canada) Nick Weiss (A); 27 (United States) Dalton Sulver	Practice squad: 29 (Canada) Carter McKenzie; 44 (Canada) Nathaniel Kozevnikov; 70 (Canada) Joel Tayler; Holdout: (Canada) Alec Tulett; 5 (Canada) Devyn Mayea; 57 (Canada) Doug Buchan; 64 (Canada) Greg Harnett; Protected list: (United States) Justin Guterding; Unable to play: 83 (Haudenosaunee) Frank Brown	Head coach: John Tavares; Assistant coaches: Steve Dietrich; Anthony Cosmo; Eric Vinc; Equipment Manager: Ted Cordingley; Legend: * Suspended list; (C) Captain; (A) Alternate captain; Roster updated 2022-02-11; NLL Transactions

=== Entry Draft ===
The 2023 NLL Entry Draft took place on September 11, 2023. The Bandits made the following selections:

Round	Overall	Player	College/Club
2	38	Evan Constantopoulos	Oakville Buzz Jr. A
3	53	Jake Rosa	St. Bonaventure
4	68	Kellen Pulera	St. Bonaventure
5	82	Duncan Carte	Brampton Express(ALL)

== Player stats ==
= Indicates team leader

= Indicates league leader

=== Runners (Top 10) ===
Player	GP	G	A	Pts	LB	PIM
Josh Byrne	18	53	82	135	75	14
Dhane Smith	18	33	101	134	119	8
Chris Cloutier	18	30	38	68	64	2
Chase Fraser	17	31	26	57	50	21
Kyle Buchanan	18	23	24	57	83	2
Tehoka Nanticoke	16	27	16	43	37	10
Ian MacKay	18	12	17	29	160	16
Nick Weiss	18	5	24	29	113	31
Brandon Robinson	13	9	8	17	39	25
Steve Priolo	18	5	8	13	120	30
Totals		237	385	622	1,276	265

=== Goaltenders ===
Player	GP	MIN	W	L	GA	Sv%	GAA
Matt Vinc	16	962:39	11	5	182	.782	11.34
Devlin Shanahan	11	78:09	0	1	20	.747	15.36
Steven Orleman	9	46:04	0	1	8	.805	10.42
Totals		1,086:52	11	7	210	.780	11.59
