= 2025 Buffalo Bandits season =

Lacrosse team season; NLL champions, league-record seventh title in team history

2025 Buffalo Bandits
- NLL Champions
- League: NLL
- 2025 record: 13–5
- Home record: 6–3
- Road record: 7–2
- Goals for: 242
- Goals against: 195
- General Manager: Steve Dietrich
- Coach: John Tavares
- Captain: Steve Priolo
- Alternate captains: Dhane Smith, Nick Weiss
- Arena: KeyBank Center
- Average attendance: 18,471

Team leaders
- Goals: Josh Byrne (44)
- Assists: Dhane Smith (103)
- Points: Dhane Smith (135)
- Penalties in minutes: Zack Belter (49)
- Loose Balls: Nick Weiss (138)
- Wins: Matt Vinc (13)
- Goals against average: Steven Orleman (9.74)

The Buffalo Bandits are a lacrosse team based in Buffalo, New York playing in the National Lacrosse League (NLL). The 2025 season was their 33rd season in the NLL. The Bandits entered the season as the defending champions for the second straight year.

In the regular season, Buffalo finished the regular season with a 13–5 record, allowing them to secure the number 1 seed in the playoffs. (Note: The Bandits and Rush finished the regular season with identical records of 13–5. Buffalo secured the number 1 seed based on the head-to-head tiebreaker with Saskatchewan, who they defeated in the regular season on March 1.) In the Quarterfinal, the Bandits survived a close contest against the San Diego Seals, winning 5–4, in the lowest scoring playoff game in league history. In the Semifinals, Buffalo swept the Vancouver Warriors in 2 games to advance to their 5th straight NLL Finals appearance, where they would face the Saskatchewan Rush.

In the Finals, Buffalo would take Game 1 over Saskatchewan, but would lose Game 2 to the Rush, forcing a deciding Game 3. In Game 3, the Bandits went on to win, 15–6, and became the first team since the original Rochester Knighthawks from 2012 to 2014 to win 3 straight NLL championships. They also became the first NLL franchise to win seven championships.

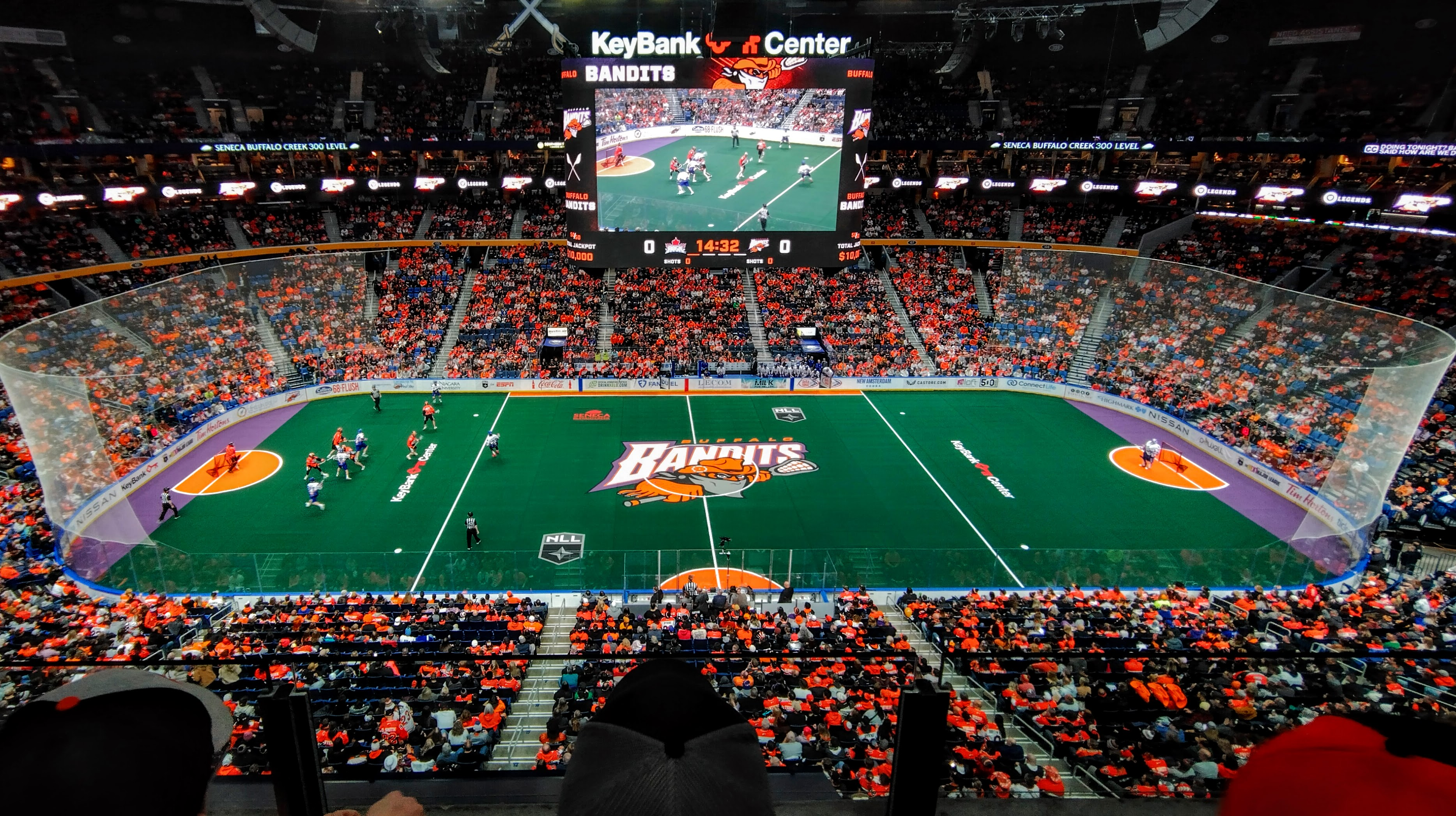
Bandits game at KeyBank Center against the Toronto Rock on January 10, 2025

== Regular season ==
NLL Standings Reference:

P	Team	GP	W	L	PCT	GB	Home	Road	GF	GA	Diff	GF/GP	GA/GP
1	Buffalo Bandits – xz	18	13	5	.722	0.0	6–3	7–2	242	195	+47	13.44	10.83
2	Saskatchewan Rush – x	18	13	5	.722	0.0	6–3	7–2	213	179	+34	11.83	9.94
3	Halifax Thunderbirds – x	18	11	7	.611	2.0	6–3	5–4	239	213	+26	13.28	11.83
4	Vancouver Warriors – x	18	11	7	.611	2.0	7–2	4–5	196	172	+24	10.89	9.56
5	Rochester Knighthawks – x	18	10	8	.556	3.0	4–5	6–3	228	209	+19	12.67	11.61
6	Calgary Roughnecks – x	18	10	8	.556	3.0	3–6	7–2	219	209	+10	12.17	11.61
7	Georgia Swarm – x	18	9	9	.500	4.0	4–5	5–4	214	217	−3	11.89	12.06
8	San Diego Seals – x	18	9	9	.500	4.0	6–3	3–6	215	209	+6	11.94	11.61
9	Ottawa Black Bears	18	8	10	.444	5.0	4–5	4–5	183	202	−19	10.17	11.22
10	Colorado Mammoth	18	8	10	.444	5.0	4–5	4–5	195	212	−17	10.83	11.78
11	Albany FireWolves	18	7	11	.389	6.0	5–4	2–7	192	209	−17	10.67	11.61
12	Philadelphia Wings	18	7	11	.389	6.0	4–5	3–6	207	231	−24	11.50	12.83
13	Toronto Rock	18	6	12	.333	7.0	2–7	4–5	189	208	−19	10.50	11.56
14	Las Vegas Desert Dogs	18	4	14	.222	9.0	2–7	2–7	189	256	−67	10.50	14.22

== Game log ==
The Bandits' schedule was released on September 17, 2024.

Game	Date	Opponent	Location	Score	OT	Attendance	Record
1	December 7, 2024	@ Rochester Knighthawks	Blue Cross Arena	W 15–7		6,454	1–0
2	December 13, 2024	@ Ottawa Black Bears	Canadian Tire Centre	W 18–7		5,272	2–0
3	December 28, 2024	Rochester Knighthawks	KeyBank Center	W 13–6		19,070	3–0
4	January 10, 2025	Toronto Rock	KeyBank Center	W 15–13		17,240	4–0
5	January 18, 2025	Philadelphia Wings	KeyBank Center	W 19–14		17,561	5–0
6	February 1, 2025	Albany FireWolves	KeyBank Center	W 16–10		18,459	6–0
7	February 14, 2025	@ Toronto Rock	Paramount Fine Foods Centre	W 13–12		5,167	7–0
8	February 15, 2025	San Diego Seals	KeyBank Center	L 13–14	OT	18,224	7–1
9	February 22, 2025	@ San Diego Seals	Pechanga Arena	W 13–12		6,280	8–1
10	March 1, 2025	@ Saskatchewan Rush	SaskTel Centre	W 9–7		7,029	9–1
11	March 8, 2025	Calgary Roughnecks	KeyBank Center	L 11–17		19,070	9–2
12	March 15, 2025	@ Calgary Roughnecks	Scotiabank Saddledome	W 11–6		16,443	10–2
13	March 21, 2025	Las Vegas Desert Dogs	KeyBank Center	W 13–10		18,474	11–2
14	March 22, 2025	@ Albany FireWolves	MVP Arena	L 10–11	OT	6,724	11–3
15	March 29, 2025	Vancouver Warriors	KeyBank Center	L 12–13		19,070	11–4
16	April 5, 2025	@ Colorado Mammoth	Ball Arena	W 15–10		10,788	12–4
17	April 12, 2025	Halifax Thunderbirds	KeyBank Center	W 15–12		19,070	13–4
18	April 19, 2025	@ Georgia Swarm	Gas South Arena	L 11–14		5,381	13–5

=== Playoffs ===
Game	Date	Opponent	Location	Score	OT	Attendance	Record
NLL Quarterfinals	April 25, 2025	San Diego Seals	KeyBank Center	W 5–4		17,703	1–0
NLL Semifinals (Game 1)	May 2, 2025	Vancouver Warriors	KeyBank Center	W 9–3		14,415	2–0
NLL Semifinals (Game 2)	May 4, 2025	@ Vancouver Warriors	Rogers Arena	W 11–9		9,176	3–0
NLL Finals (Game 1)	May 16, 2025	Saskatchewan Rush	KeyBank Center	W 12–10		16,761	4–0
NLL Finals (Game 2)	May 18, 2025	@ Saskatchewan Rush	SaskTel Centre	L 10–11		8,216	4–1
NLL Finals (Game 3)	May 24, 2025	Saskatchewan Rush	KeyBank Center	W 15–6		19,070	5–1

== Roster ==
Buffalo Bandits roster
Active (21-man) roster		Inactive roster	Coaches
Goaltenders: 44 (Canada) Steve Orleman; 48 (Canada) Matt Vinc; Defensemen: 5 (Canada) Cam Wyers; 6 (Canada) Paul Dawson; 8 (Canada) Dylan Robinson; 21 (Canada) Justin Martin; 23 (Canada) Steve Priolo (C); 77 (United States) Zack Belter	Forwards: 1 (Haudenosaunee) Tehoka Nanticoke; 2 (Canada) Chris Cloutier; 12 (Canada) Sam La Roue; 18 (Canada) Lukas Nielsen; 22 (Canada) Josh Byrne; 81 (Haudenosaunee) Clay Scanlan; 91 (Canada) Kyle Buchanan; 92 (Canada) Dhane Smith (A); 95 (Canada) Chase Fraser; Transition: 3 (Canada) Thomas Whitty; 4 (Canada) Ian MacKay; 20 (Canada) Nick Weiss (A); 41 (United States) Connor Farrell	Practice squad: 17 (Canada) Taylor Dooley; 42 (Canada) Trent Robertson; 46 (Canada) Evan Constantopoulos; Injured reserve: 7 (Canada) Emerson Clark; 25 (Canada) Matt Spanger; Unable to play: 94 (Canada) Bryce Sweeting	Head coach John Tavares Legend: * Suspended list; (C) Captain; (A) Alternate captain; Roster updated 2025-2-20; NLL Transactions

=== Dispersal Draft ===
On August 30, 2024, the NLL announced that the Panther City Lacrosse Club would cease operations. The league held a dispersal draft on September 2.

Round	Overall	Player
1	14	Traded to Philadelphia (Note: The Bandits traded the 14th overall selection in the 2024 Dispersal Draft to the Philadelphia Wings in exchange for Philadelphia’s 2nd round selection in the 2025 Entry Draft.)

=== Entry Draft ===
The 2024 NLL Entry Draft was held virtually on September 15. The Bandits' selections are listed below.

Round	Overall	Player	College/Club	Notes
1	7	Lukas Nielsen	New Westminster Salmonbellies (WLA)	from Ottawa
1	8	Luca Antongiovanni	University of North Carolina (ACC)	from Rochester
1	15	Taylor Dooley	Ennismore James Gang (Ontario Series Lacrosse)	
2	19	Trent Robertson	Brampton Express (Arena Lacrosse League)	from Vancouver
3	35	Marquez White	Princeton Tigers (Ivy League)	from Ottawa via Colorado
4	57	Angus McDonnell	Mimico Mountaineers (OLA Junior A Lacrosse League)	
5	65	Bryce Cordingley	Mimico Mountaineers (OLA Junior A Lacrosse League)	from Rochester
6	86	Vance Adams	Akwesasne Thunder (OLA Junior B Lacrosse League)	

== Player stats ==
= Indicates team leader

= Indicates league leader

=== Runners (Top 10) ===
Player	GP	G	A	Pts	LB	PIM
Josh Byrne	18	44	90	134	88	18
Dhane Smith	18	32	102	134	116	6
Kyle Buchanan	18	34	21	55	86	4
Ian MacKay	18	37	17	54	94	16
Chase Fraser	17	26	24	50	42	20
Chris Cloutier	14	17	20	37	47	4
Tehoka Nanticoke	16	18	15	33	38	10
Nick Weiss	18	7	19	26	138	47
Steve Priolo	18	4	13	17	110	34
Clay Scanlan	11	9	7	16	25	4
Totals		242	374	616	1,348	301

=== Goaltenders ===
Player	GP	MIN	W	L	GA	Sv%	GAA
Matt Vinc	18	1,080:51	13	5	193	.791	10.71
Steven Orleman	18	12:19	0	0	2	.818	9.74
Totals		1,093:10	13	5	195	.791	10.70
