= Chris White (lacrosse) =

Canadian lacrosse player (born 1980)

Personal information
- Nationality: Canadian
- Born: April 26, 1980 (age 45) Peterborough, Ontario, Canada
- Height: 6 ft 0 in (183 cm)
- Weight: 190 lb (86 kg; 13 st 8 lb)

Sport
- Position: Defense
- Shoots: Right
- NLL draft: 20th overall, 2001; Albany Attack
- NLL team Former teams: Toronto Rock; Buffalo Bandits; San Jose Stealth; Albany Attack
- Pro career: 2003–

Chris White (born April 26, 1980) is a professional box lacrosse player in the National Lacrosse League with the Toronto Rock.

== Professional career ==
White was originally drafted in the second round, 20th overall by the Albany Attack in the 2001 NLL Entry Draft.

White played one season with the Attack, then transferred with the franchise when it relocated to San Jose, California and became the San Jose Stealth in 2004.

He was acquired by the Bandits in a trade on December 4, 2004. He was traded to the Bandits by the Stealth in exchange for a first-round pick, 11th overall (which was originally the Toronto Rock's pick) in the 2005 NLL Entry Draft.

As of the conclusion of the 2008 season, White is ninth all-time on the Bandits penalty list. To start the 2009 season, he was named captain of the Bandits in place of injured Rich Kilgour. White served as captain for four games. During the 2009 NLL season, he was named a starter to the All-Star Game.

After two more years in Buffalo, serving as the team captain after the retirement of Rich Kilgour, White became an unrestricted free agent and signed a one-year deal with the Toronto Rock.

== Statistics ==
=== NLL ===
Chris White		Regular season									Playoffs								
Season	Team	GP	G	A	Pts	LB	PIM	Pts/GP	LB/GP	PIM/GP	GP	G	A	Pts	LB	PIM	Pts/GP	LB/GP	PIM/GP
2003	Albany Attack	13	1	1	2	27	18	0.15	2.08	1.38	–	–	–	–	–	–	–	–	–
2004	San Jose Stealth	16	3	3	6	47	43	0.38	2.94	2.69	1	0	2	2	7	0	2.00	7.00	0.00
2005	Buffalo Bandits	7	0	1	1	22	17	0.14	3.14	2.43	1	0	0	0	2	2	0.00	2.00	2.00
2006	Buffalo Bandits	16	0	8	8	58	51	0.50	3.63	3.19	3	0	2	2	11	10	0.67	3.67	3.33
2007	Buffalo Bandits	15	0	5	5	39	51	0.33	2.60	3.40	2	0	3	3	8	6	1.50	4.00	3.00
2008	Buffalo Bandits	16	3	4	7	50	59	0.44	3.13	3.69	3	0	1	1	14	2	0.33	4.67	0.67
2009	Buffalo Bandits	16	0	8	8	66	47	0.50	4.13	2.94	2	0	0	0	4	2	0.00	2.00	1.00
2010	Buffalo Bandits	13	0	6	6	67	13	0.46	5.15	1.00	1	0	0	0	7	2	0.00	7.00	2.00
2011	Buffalo Bandits	16	0	11	11	84	14	0.69	5.25	0.88	2	0	1	1	8	6	0.50	4.00	3.00
2012	Buffalo Bandits	15	0	6	6	53	27	0.40	3.53	1.80	1	0	0	0	5	0	0.00	5.00	0.00
2013	Toronto Rock	15	0	3	3	40	21	0.20	2.67	1.40	1	0	0	0	1	4	0.00	1.00	4.00
2014	Toronto Rock	5	0	1	1	7	16	0.20	1.40	3.20	–	–	–	–	–	–	–	–	–
		163	7	57	64	560	377	0.39	3.44	2.31	17	0	9	9	67	34	0.53	3.94	2.00
Career Total:		180	7	66	73	627	411	0.41	3.48	2.28									

GP–Games played; G–Goals; A–Assists; Pts–Points; LB–Loose balls; PIM–Penalty minutes; Pts/GP–Points per games played; LB/GP–Loose balls per games played; PIM/GP–Penalty minutes per games played.
