= John Tavares (lacrosse) =

Canadian lacrosse player (born 1968)

Personal information
- Born: September 4, 1968 (age 57) Toronto, Ontario, Canada
- Height: 5 ft 11 in (180 cm)
- Weight: 175 lb (79 kg; 12 st 7 lb)

Sport
- Position: Forward
- Shoots: Left
- Coached by: Buffalo Bandits (Assistant) (2016–2019); Head coach (2019–present)
- NLL team: Buffalo Bandits
- CLA teams: Peterborough Lakers; Brampton Excelsiors; Six Nations Chiefs; Victoria Shamrocks
- Pro career: 1992–2015

Career highlights
- NLL all-time leader: goals (815) and points (1,749); NLL champion (2008); 2x NLL MVP (2000, 2001); 3x NLL Top Scorer (2000, 2001, 2003) 3x MILL Champion (1992, 1993, 1996); 3x MILL MVP (1992, 1993, 1994); 3x MILL Top Scorer (1993, 1994, 1996); 2x MILL Championship MVP (1992, 1993)

John Tavares (born September 4, 1968, in Toronto, Ontario) is a Canadian retired professional box lacrosse player and now is the current head coach of the Buffalo Bandits of the National Lacrosse League (NLL) and Six Nations Chiefs of the Major Series Lacrosse League. As a player, he spent his entire 24-year career in Buffalo. He is widely considered the greatest box lacrosse player of all time and is the NLL's all time point leader.

Starting with the Bandits in their inaugural season in 1992, he was acquired from the Detroit Turbos in exchange for Brian Nikula in October 1991. Tavares was also the Professional Lacrosse Players' Association representative for the Bandits.

Tavares is the NLL's all-time leader in games played (306), goals (815), assists (934), and points (1,749). His 2,191 loose balls recovered is the second most all-time.

Tavares is the uncle of John Tavares, the alternate captain and star forward of the Toronto Maple Leafs.

Tavares is currently the head coach of the MSL's Six Nations Chiefs, winning the 2023 MANN cup.

John Tavares was awarded the Order of Sport, marking his induction into Canada's Sports Hall of Fame on May 12, 2022.

== National Lacrosse League ==
On February 18, 2006, the Buffalo Bandits defeated the Minnesota Swarm by a score of 14–9 in front of 12,458 fans at HSBC Arena in Buffalo, New York. In that game, John Tavares tied the NLL Career Points (goals + assists) record at 1,091 points held by Gary Gait, who had retired after the 2005 season.

On March 4, 2006, 10,961 fans witnessed history. On that night, the Buffalo Bandits played their 7th regular season game again hosting the Minnesota Swarm, and Tavares scored two points in an 11–8 loss. The first was his 1,092nd career point, the record-breaker, which was an assist to Mark Steenhuis who scored a power-play goal at 11:57 in the second period. (The second point, Point 1,093, was also an assist to Steenhuis in the third period.) Play was stopped, and Tavares was given the game ball.

On January 20, 2008, Tavares scored his 597th career goal (against goalie Matt Vinc) in a win over the New York Titans, passing Gary Gait and becoming the NLL's all-time leader in goals scored. On May 17, 2008, Tavares won his fourth championship and first since 1996. The Bandits beat the Portland Lumberjax in the championship game with the help of two Tavares goals.

During the 2009 NLL season, he was named to the All-Star Game.

Following the end of his playing career after the 2015 season, Tavares remained with the Bandits as an assistant coach, before being elevated to co-head coach of the Bandits in 2019. In his first season in that position, he won the Les Bartley Award for the NLL's top head coach for the season, an award he shared with Rich Kilgour. Tavares became Buffalo's full-time head coach for the 2020 season after Kilgour's contract was not renewed by the team.

Tavares won his first NLL championship as a head coach with Buffalo in 2023, his fifth championship overall. The Bandits repeated as league champions in 2024 and 2025, marking his sixth and seventh NLL titles for his career as a player and a coach.

=== Career totals including playoffs ===
- Games Played: 344
- Career Goals: 899
- Career Assists: 1,050
- Career Points: 1,949
- Loose Balls: 2,464
- Tavares was the first player in NLL history to have 500 goals and 500 assists.

=== Points milestones ===
- No. 1: Jan. 4, 1992, assist to Rich Kilgour vs. New York in first game.
- 100: March 20, 1993, goal vs. Detroit's Paul Mootz in 16th game.
- 200: Jan. 20, 1996, goal vs. Baltimore's J.J. Pearl in 34th game.
- 300: Feb. 7, 1997, assist to Darris Kilgour vs. Baltimore in 47th game.
- 400: Jan. 8, 1999, goal vs. Philadelphia's Dallas Eliuk in 62nd game.
- 500: Feb. 18, 2000, goal vs. Rochester's Pat O'Toole in 78th game.
- 600: Feb. 10, 2001, goal vs. Washington's Devin Dalep in 91st game.
- 700: Feb. 1, 2002, assist to Chris Driscoll vs. Montreal in 107th game.
- 800: Feb. 8, 2003, assist to Mike Accursi vs. Toronto in 122nd game.
- 900: Feb. 14, 2004, goal vs. Anaheim's Matt Disher in 139th game.
- 1,000: Feb. 19, 2005, assist to Delby Powless vs. Rochester in 154th game.
- 1,091: Feb. 18, 2006, assist to Cory Bomberry vs. Minnesota in 169th game. (Ties Gary Gait's then-existing NLL Career Points Record)
- 1,092: March 4, 2006, assist to Mark Steenhuis vs. Minnesota in 170th game. (New NLL Career Points Record)
- 1,600: March 17, 2012, goal vs. Minnesota in 259th game.
- 1,949: May 8, 2015, assist to Dhane Smith vs. Rochester in (Division Semifinal) game 349. (final tally)

=== Career statistics ===
John Tavares		Regular season									Playoffs								
Season	Team	GP	G	A	Pts	LB	PIM	Pts/GP	LB/GP	PIM/GP	GP	G	A	Pts	LB	PIM	Pts/GP	LB/GP	PIM/GP
1992	Buffalo Bandits	8	21	22	43	66	26	5.38	8.25	3.25	3	12	12	24	29	8	8.00	9.67	2.67
1993	Buffalo Bandits	8	35	23	58	93	28	7.25	11.63	3.50	2	4	3	7	6	2	3.50	3.00	1.00
1994	Buffalo Bandits	8	27	20	47	74	14	5.88	9.25	1.75	2	6	8	14	19	9	7.00	9.50	4.50
1995	Buffalo Bandits	8	24	21	45	66	21	5.63	8.25	2.63	1	2	1	3	6	0	3.00	6.00	0.00
1996	Buffalo Bandits	10	41	40	81	102	4	8.10	10.20	0.40	2	4	7	11	20	2	5.50	10.00	1.00
1997	Buffalo Bandits	10	37	29	66	104	18	6.60	10.40	1.80	2	7	9	16	30	0	8.00	15.00	0.00
1998	Buffalo Bandits	9	31	25	56	80	8	6.22	8.89	0.89	1	2	5	7	9	0	7.00	9.00	0.00
1999	Buffalo Bandits	12	33	34	67	112	35	5.58	9.33	2.92	–	–	–	–	–	–	–	–	–
2000	Buffalo Bandits	12	34	49	83	123	10	6.92	10.25	0.83	1	2	1	3	18	0	3.00	18.00	0.00
2001	Buffalo Bandits	14	51	64	115	159	14	8.21	11.36	1.00	–	–	–	–	–	–	–	–	–
2002	Buffalo Bandits	16	42	46	88	145	12	5.50	9.06	0.75	–	–	–	–	–	–	–	–	–
2003	Buffalo Bandits	16	49	58	107	155	25	6.69	9.69	1.56	2	5	8	13	16	0	6.50	8.00	0.00
2004	Buffalo Bandits	16	49	44	93	118	25	5.81	7.38	1.56	3	7	13	20	21	4	6.67	7.00	1.33
2005	Buffalo Bandits	16	43	59	102	126	9	6.38	7.88	0.56	1	2	3	5	9	0	5.00	9.00	0.00
2006	Buffalo Bandits	16	32	53	85	95	12	5.31	5.94	0.75	3	7	4	11	13	0	3.67	4.33	0.00
2007	Buffalo Bandits	15	42	61	103	77	6	6.87	5.13	0.40	2	5	5	10	12	2	5.00	6.00	1.00
2008	Buffalo Bandits	16	29	58	87	91	23	5.44	5.69	1.44	3	5	14	19	22	0	6.33	7.33	0.00
2009	Buffalo Bandits	16	51	43	94	98	6	5.88	6.13	0.38	2	2	6	8	10	0	4.00	5.00	0.00
2010	Buffalo Bandits	10	21	28	49	57	22	4.90	5.70	2.20	1	0	2	2	5	0	2.00	5.00	0.00
2011	Buffalo Bandits	16	32	46	78	59	10	4.88	3.69	0.63	1	3	4	7	3	0	7.00	3.00	0.00
2012	Buffalo Bandits	16	41	39	80	53	8	5.00	3.31	0.50	1	2	1	3	3	0	3.00	3.00	0.00
2013	Buffalo Bandits	12	14	25	39	38	6	3.25	3.17	0.50	–	–	–	–	–	–	–	–	–
2014	Buffalo Bandits	16	24	27	51	78	31	3.19	4.88	1.94	3	7	5	12	17	0	4.00	5.67	0.00
2015	Buffalo Bandits	9	12	20	32	22	6	3.56	2.44	0.67	1	0	5	5	5	0	5.00	5.00	0.00
		305	815	934	1,749	2,191	379	5.73	7.18	1.24	37	84	116	200	273	27	5.41	7.38	0.73
Career Total:		342	899	1,050	1,949	2,464	406	5.70	7.20	1.19									

GP–Games played; G–Goals; A–Assists; Pts–Points; LB–Loose balls; PIM–Penalty minutes; Pts/GP–Points per games played; LB/GP–Loose balls per games played; PIM/GP–Penalty minutes per games played.

=== Coaching statistics ===
Team	Season	Regular season				Playoffs				Playoff result
Team	Season	GC	W	L	W%	GC	W	L	W%	Playoff result
Buffalo Bandits	2019*	18	14	4	.778	4	2	2	.500	Lost NLL Finals (CGY)
Buffalo Bandits	2020	11	7	4	.636	–	–	–	–	Season suspended due to COVID-19 pandemic
Buffalo Bandits	2022	18	14	4	.778	6	4	2	.667	Lost NLL Finals (COL)
Buffalo Bandits	2023	18	14	4	.778	6	5	1	.833	Won NLL Finals (COL)
Buffalo Bandits	2024	18	11	7	.611	5	5	0	1.000	Won NLL Finals (ALB)
Buffalo Bandits	2025	18	13	5	.722	6	5	1	.833	Won NLL Finals (SSK)
Buffalo Bandits	2026	18	11	7	.611	1	0	1	.000	Lost Quarterfinals (GA)
Totals:	7	119	84	35	.706	28	21	7	.750	

* - shared head coaching duties with Rich Kilgour

== Canadian Lacrosse Association ==
Tavares' teams have won seven Mann Cups, 1992 and 1993 with the Brampton Excelsiors, 1994 through 1996 with the Six Nations Chiefs, 2002 with the Victoria Shamrocks, and 2012 with the Peterborough Lakers. In 1992, 1993, and 1996, Tavares won the Mike Kelley Memorial Trophy as most valuable player in the Mann Cup competition. Tavares also won the Major Series Lacrosse scoring title eight times, and the MSL's Most Valuable Player award three times. Tavares played Ontario Junior A lacrosse for the Mississauga Tomahawks.

=== Statistics ===
			Regular Season					Playoffs
Season	Team	League	GP	G	A	Pts	PIM	GP	G	A	Pts	PIM
1983	Mississauga Tomahawks	OLA Jr B	1	4	0	4	0	2	0	0	0	4
1984	Mississauga Tomahawks	OLA Jr B	-	-	-	-	-	2	7	4	11	0
1985	Mississauga Tomahawks	OLA Jr B	4	7	2	9	9	10	17	15	32	4
1986	Mississauga Tomahawks	OLA Jr B	17	132	44	176	14	15	71	28	99	16
1987	Mississauga Tomahawks	OLA Jr B	23	128	56	184	25	11	42	23	65	12
1987	Bay Area Bengals	OLA Jr A	1	3	2	5	0	-	-	-	-	-
1988	Mississauga Tomahawks	OLA Jr A	23	77	72	149	36	-	-	-	-	-
1989	Mississauga Tomahawks	OLA Jr A	24	70	61	131	35	-	-	-	-	-
1989	Orangeville Northmen	MSL	1	2	2	4	0	-	-	-	-	-
1990	Vancouver Burrards	WLA	16	32	28	60	30	15	20	23	43	35
1991	Vancouver Burrards	WLA	24	46	48	94	80	4	5	6	11	14
1992	Brampton Excelsiors	MSL	16	44	46	90	47	13	30	26	56	25
1993	Brampton Excelsiors	MSL	16	53	40	93	39	13	34	29	63	22
1994	Six Nations Chiefs	MSL	13	44	45	89	42	18	42	46	88	32
1995	Six Nations Chiefs	MSL	20	55	53	108	50	14	31	36	67	20
1996	Six Nations Chiefs	MSL	24	69	71	140	45	14	39	24	63	38
1997	Six Nations Chiefs	MSL	20	46	57	103	27	4	9	5	14	8
1998	Akwesasne Thunder	MSL	16	33	48	81	27	-	-	-	-	-
1999	Akwesasne Thunder	MSL	18	36	43	79	25	16	26	29	55	28
2000	Akwesasne Thunder	MSL	16	45	66	111	45	-	-	-	-	-
2001	Akwesasne Thunder	MSL	14	26	52	78	10	-	-	-	-	-
2001	Victoria Shamrocks	WLA	8	20	32	52	6	11	25	27	52	13
2002	Victoria Shamrocks	WLA	7	9	23	32	15	17	34	39	73	6
2003	Victoria Shamrocks	WLA	8	14	22	36	11	14	27	26	53	21
2004	Akwesasne Thunder	MSL	18	38	51	89	7	3	5	4	9	0
2005	Akwesasne Thunder	MSL	17	31	55	86	8	3	7	0	7	4
2006	St. Regis Indians	MSL	13	16	40	56	11	3	2	7	9	0
2007	St. Regis Indians	MSL	10	10	25	35	2	10	7	21	28	9
2008	St. Regis Indians	MSL	17	34	59	93	6	9	17	24	41	4
2009	St. Regis Indians	MSL	12	16	29	45	2	9	14	22	36	7
2010	Peterborough Lakers	MSL	11	20	20	40	4	18	24	30	54	4
2011	Peterborough Lakers	MSL	18	20	41	61	2	11	7	20	27	4
2012	Peterborough Lakers	MSL	12	12	22	34	2	17	17	38	55	4
Junior B			45	271	102	373	48	40	127	70	197	36
Junior A Totals			48	150	135	285	71	-	-	-	-	-
Senior A Totals			365	771	1018	1789	543	236	422	482	904	301

== International play ==
Medal record

Indoor lacrosse

Representing Canada

World Championships
Gold medal – first place	2003 Toronto	
Gold medal – first place	2007 Halifax	

John Tavares represented Canada internationally. He played for his home country in the 2003 and in the 2007 World Championships, winning the gold medal in both.

== See also ==
- NLL records

Preceded by Gary Gait	MILL Championship game MVP; 1992, 1993	Succeeded by Paul Gait
Preceded by none	MILL MVP; 1994	Succeeded by Gary Gait
Preceded by Gary Gait	NLL MVP; 2000, 2001	Succeeded by Paul Gait
Preceded by Derek Keenan	Les Bartley Award; 2019 (Note: Award shared with Rich Kilgour)	Succeeded by Paul Day
