= Blood, Sweat & Chrome =

2022 book

Blood, Sweat & Chrome: The Wild and True Story of Mad Max: Fury Road
- Author: Kyle Buchanan
- Audio read by: Fred Berman
- Cover artist: Leah Carlson-Stanisic
- Language: English
- Genre: non-fiction
- Published: 22 February 2022
- Publisher: HarperCollins
- Publication place: United States
- Pages: 384 (first edition)
- ISBN: 978-0-06-308434-6

Blood, Sweat & Chrome: The Wild and True Story of Mad Max: Fury Road is a non-fiction book by author and film journalist Kyle Buchanan. The book covers the production of the film Mad Max: Fury Road, as well as the career of director George Miller.

== Contents ==
The book is structured as an oral history, consisting of intercut snippets of more than 130 interviews with the films' cast and crew, as well as critics, filmmakers, and admirers of the film.

The main narrative is split into three parts. "Part I: Building A World Gone Mad," begins with George Miller's early career and the first three Mad Max films: Mad Max, Mad Max 2 (The Road Warrior), and Mad Max Beyond Thunderdome. It also covers the rest of Miller's filmography and the long preproduction of Fury Road. The film endures false starts, and torrential rains force the majority of shooting to relocate from Broken Hill, Australia to the Namib desert in Namibia.

"Part II: Shoot to Kill" goes into depth about shooting the majority of the action scenes and exteriors in the Namib desert, as well as the interiors done on sound stages in Cape Town, South Africa. Production issues arise due to the harsh natural environment, culture shock, interpersonal conflicts, and the changing priorities of executives at Warner Bros. Pictures. Production is shut down before Fury Road's beginning and ending sequences can be completed, due to budgetary concerns.

"Part III: End of the Road" covers post-production, during which Miller and his wife, Margaret Sixel, struggle to edit four hundred hours of footage into a feature-length film. The film production is finally allowed to shoot the beginning and ending in Sydney, Australia. The successful advertising campaign sets a positive tone for the theatrical release. Interviewees reflect on the film's legacy and influence. The then-upcoming Fury Road prequel, Furiosa: A Mad Max Saga, is mentioned.

== Reception ==
The critical reception was generally positive. Brian Tallerico of RogerEbert.com wrote, "Blood, Sweat & Chrome Offers Full, Fascinating History of Mad Max: Fury Road"

Chris Klimek of The Washington Post wrote, "'Blood, Sweat & Chrome' offers a candid, sometimes contradictory, always compelling examination of the most unlikely big-budget cinematic triumph since 'Titanic.'"

For Paste, Jacob Oller felt, "Blood, Sweat & Chrome rises to its subject matter...in its dedication to getting 'the only thing they done got' right, simplicity be damned."

The Independent's review wrote, "Kyle Buchanan’s oral history “Blood, Sweat & Chrome: The Wild and True Story of ‘Mad Max: Fury Road’” pulls away from clichés," and "The pop culture reporter for The New York Times assembles scores of voices that rev up a narrative that will excite Mad Max fans specifically, and entertain film buffs generally, on how ideas are realized as epics."
