= Matt Zash =

American lacrosse player

Personal information
- Nickname: Prince
- Born: October 18, 1983 (age 42) Massapequa, New York, U.S.
- Height: 5 ft 11 in (180 cm)
- Weight: 190 lb (86 kg; 13 st 8 lb)

Sport
- Position: Midfield/Transition
- NLL draft: 32nd overall, 2006; New York Titans
- NLL team Former teams: Philadelphia Wings; Rochester Knighthawks; Orlando Titans; New York Titans
- MLL team Former teams: Long Island Lizards; Philadelphia Barrage
- Former NCAA team: Duke University
- Pro career: 2006–

Matt Zash (born October 18, 1983, in Massapequa, New York) is a retired lacrosse player, formerly of the Philadelphia Wings in the National Lacrosse League, and of the Long Island Lizards of Major League Lacrosse.

== Collegiate ==
Zash played under Coach Mike Pressler at Duke University, where he helped lead the Blue Devils to the NCAA Men's Lacrosse Championship game in 2005. Zash's, who was team co-captain, senior season was cut short by the 2006 Duke University lacrosse case.

== Major League Lacrosse ==
Zash was drafted by the Philadelphia Barrage in the first round (sixth overall) in the 2006 MLL Collegiate Draft. In his first two seasons in the Major League Lacrosse, Zash and his teammates won back-to-back MLL championships.

== National Lacrosse League ==
Zash was drafted by the New York Titans with 32nd overall pick in the 2006 National Lacrosse League entry draft. Zash, who has played field lacrosse since childhood, described the transition from field to box lacrosse as:

It's faster, unbelievably physical, and awfully frustrating. I still haven't quite figured out how one gets that ball past that huge goalie and into that tiny net...while someone is crosschecking you in the back.

Zash figured out the indoor game by end of his rookie season, having been awarded Rookie of the Week honors in the final week of the 2007 NLL season.

Zash played two more seasons with the Titans organization: one in New York and one in Orlando after the team moved there for the 2010 NLL season. The Titans disbanded after that season, and Zash was chosen by the Washington Stealth in the dispersal draft. He was then traded to the Colorado Mammoth for a draft pick, and then traded again, this time to Rochester as part of the Matt Vinc/John Grant Jr. swap. After playing only four games with the Knighthawks, Zash was traded for two draft picks to the Philadelphia Wings.

Zash also won a bronze medal with Team USA in the 2007 World Indoor Lacrosse Championships. After the 2011 season with Philadelphia, Zash retired from the NLL, and now works in property management in the greater New York City area.

== Statistics ==
=== MLL ===
		Regular Season							Playoffs
Season	Team	GP	G	2ptG	A	Pts	LB	PIM	GP	G	2ptG	A	Pts	LB	PIM
2006	Philadelphia	10	1	0	2	3	28	3	2	1	0	0	1	17	0
2007	Philadelphia	9	2	0	1	3	55	3	1	0	0	0	0	0	0
2008	Barrage	12	0	0	1	1	37	2	1	1	0	0	1	2	3
2009	Long Island	11	2	0	0	2	22	1.5	1	1	0	0	1	1	0
MLL Totals		42	5	0	4	9	142	10.5	5	3	0	0	3	20	3

== Statistics ==
=== NLL ===
		Regular Season						Playoffs
Season	Team	GP	G	A	Pts	LB	PIM	GP	G	A	Pts	LB	PIM
2007	New York	9	5	8	13	46	0	--	--	--	--	--	--
2009	New York	14	1	10	11	79	8	--	--	--	--	--	--
2010	Orlando	10	2	5	7	39	6	1	1	1	2	7	0
2011	Rochester	4	0	1	1	18	2	--	--	--	--	--	--
2011	Philadelphia	6	0	1	1	38	0	--	--	--	--	--	--
NLL totals		43	8	25	33	220	16	1	1	1	2	7	0

== Personal ==
Zash co-owns a lacrosse store in Massapequa, New York called the "Lax Hut."
