= Rich Kilgour =

American lacrosse player

Personal information
- Nationality: Native American
- Born: April 5, 1967 (age 59) Niagara Falls, NY, United States
- Height: 6 ft 0 in (183 cm)
- Weight: 185 lb (84 kg; 13 st 3 lb)

Sport
- Position: Transition
- Shoots: Right
- NLL teams: Buffalo Bandits
- Pro career: 1992–2009

Rich Kilgour (born January 14, 1969) is a retired professional lacrosse player and coach who was most recently the co-head coach of the Buffalo Bandits of the National Lacrosse League. He joined the Bandits in 1992 as a training camp invitee, and spent the next 18 years as a defensive specialist with the Bandits, 12 of those as team captain. His teams made the playoffs 13 times, played in eight championship games, and won four.

A Niagara Falls, New York native, Kilgour played lacrosse and football at Niagara-Wheatfield High School, and attended Nazareth College from 1988 to 1990. As a Bandit, he played alongside his brothers Darris and Travis.

Since retiring from the playing box, Kilgour has served as an assistant coach with the Bandits. He served as the head coach of the Niagara County Community College lacrosse program from 2009 to 2014, and served as the head coach of the Iroquois Nationals for the 2015 World Indoor Lacrosse Championship and again in 2019. As head coach of the Six Nations Chiefs of Major Series Lacrosse, Kilgour has coached back-to-back Mann Cup winning squads in 2013 and 2014.

In recognition of his achievements in the NLL, Kilgour was inducted into the Greater Buffalo Sports Hall of Fame and the NLL Hall of Fame 2010. His number, 16, was retired by the Bandits on April 16, 2011.
