= Buffalo Bandits =

NLL professional box lacrosse team in Buffalo, New York

- Sport: Box lacrosse
- Founded: 1991
- League: National Lacrosse League
- Location: Buffalo, New York
- Arena: KeyBank Center
- Colors: Orange, Purple, Black, White
- Owner: Terry Pegula
- Head coach: John Tavares
- General manager: Steve Dietrich
- League titles: 7 (1992, 1993, 1996, 2008, 2023, 2024, 2025)
- Conference titles: 2 (2022, 2023)
- Division titles: 8 (1993, 1994, 1996, 2006, 2008, 2011, 2016, 2019)
- Local media: WNLO, WWKB, WGR
- Retired numbers: 4 (11, 16, 34, 43)
- Website: bandits.com

The Buffalo Bandits are an American professional box lacrosse team based in Buffalo, New York, that competes in the National Lacrosse League (NLL). The team plays its home games at KeyBank Center. The Bandits played in the Major Indoor Lacrosse League from 1992 to 1997, then in its successor the NLL since 1998. The Bandits are one of the oldest franchises in the league, behind the Oshawa FireWolves (which were founded in 1987 as the original Philadelphia Wings franchise) and the Colorado Mammoth (which were founded in 1987 as the Baltimore Thunder). The Bandits are the oldest franchise still playing in their original city and are widely regarded as the most popular franchise in the league. The Bandits are tied with the Toronto Rock for the most National Lacrosse League Cup championships with 7 titles.

The Bandits are owned by Hockey Western New York LLC, led by Terry Pegula who also owns the Rochester Americans, Buffalo Sabres and the Buffalo Bills.

== History ==
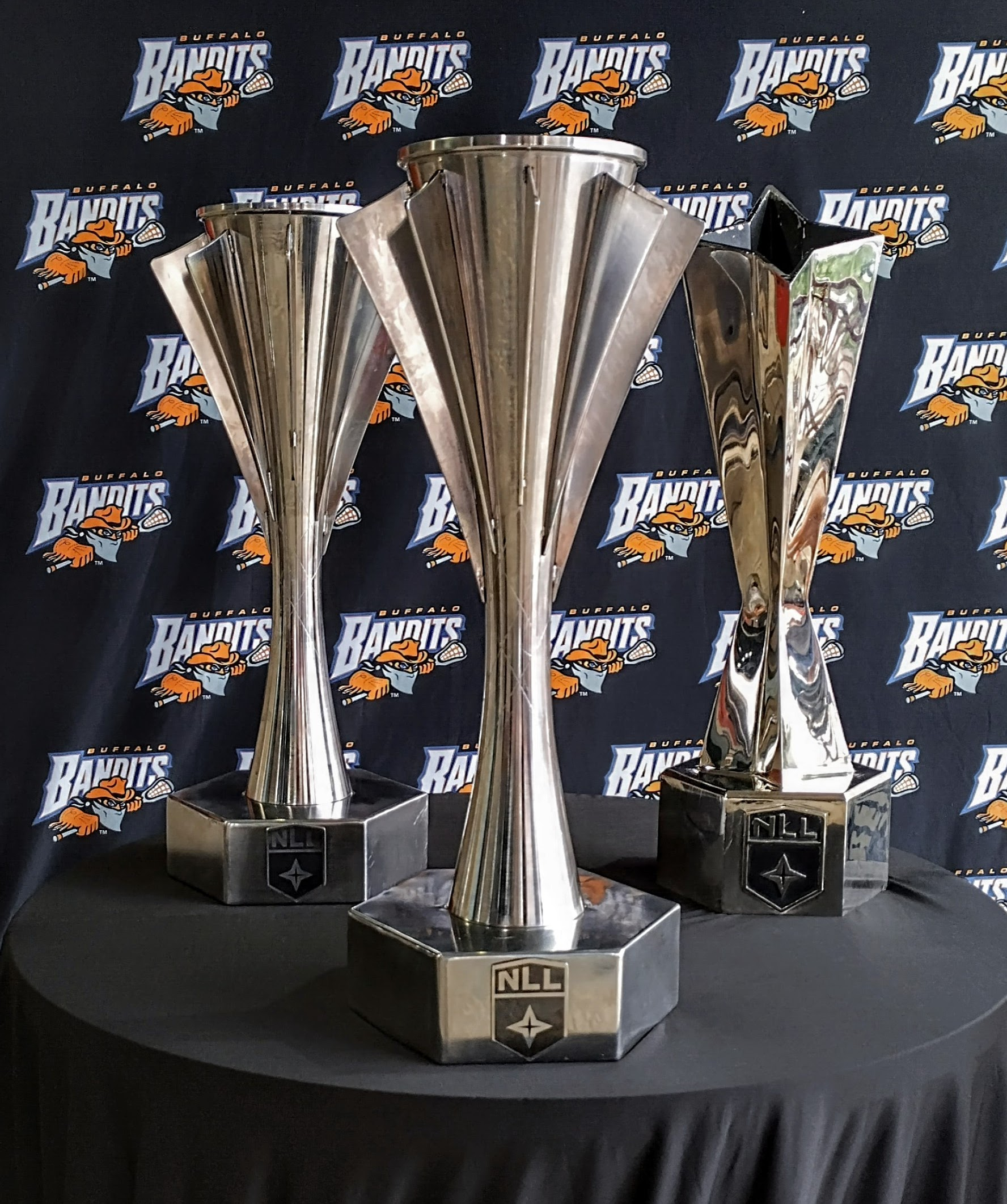
The three NLL Cups won by the Bandits in the 2020s. The cup on the left was awarded in 2024, the cup in the center was awarded in 2025, and the cup on the right was awarded in 2023.

The Bandits played their first season in 1992. They played home games at Buffalo Memorial Auditorium sharing with the Buffalo Sabres until its closure in 1996.

The Bandits became the first expansion franchise in MILL/NLL history to win a championship in its first season. The Bandits repeated as champions in their second season, compiling the league's only perfect season to date that year, lost the championship game their third season and captured their third Championship in 1996, their fifth season. It was not until 1999, their eighth season, that the Bandits did not make the playoffs.

After their 1996 championship-winning season, the Bandits returned to the NLL Championship in 1997, 2004, and 2006) only to lose each time, including twice at home. It would not be until 2008 that the Bandits would win their elusive fourth championship, a 14–13 triumph over Portland. The Bandits would lose the finals three more times before securing their fifth championship in 2023. The Bandits won their fifth title against the Colorado Mammoth winning the third and final game of the three game series 13–4. The following year, the Bandits repeated as champions, winning their sixth title in a sweep of the Albany FireWolves. The Bandits secured a third-straight championship in 2025, their 7th overall and most in the NLL all-time.

As of 2025, Buffalo is the longest tenured team in the NLL, in terms of continuous years in their home city, at 33 seasons. The team is also the strongest-attended franchise in the league, with an average attendance of over 18,000 fans per game in 2025, an NLL record.

== Awards and honors ==
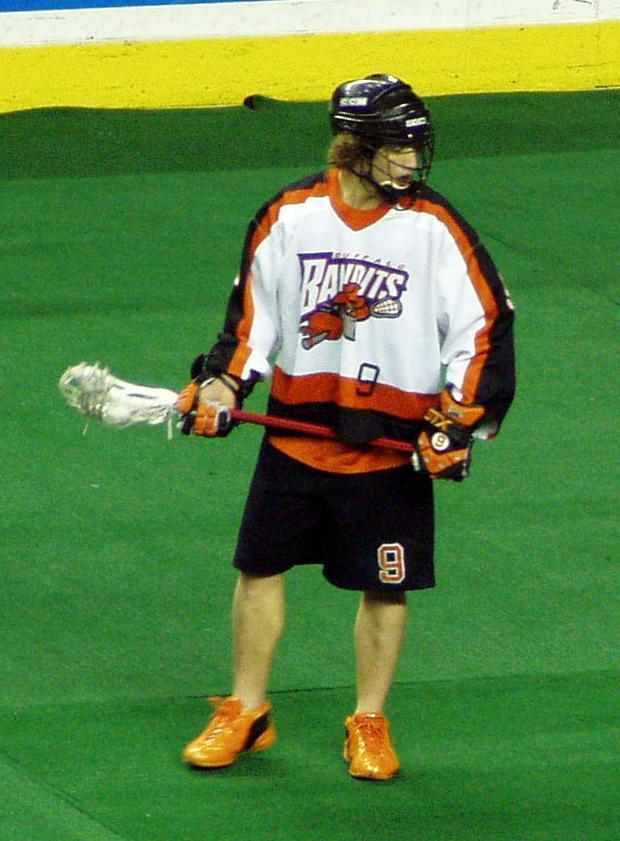
During the 2009 season, Mark Steenhuis set two league records for most assists (13) and points (17) in a single game. He was also selected to his fifth all-star game, second consecutive as a starter.

Year	Player	Award
1992	Derek Keenan	Rookie of the Year
1992	John Tavares	Championship Game MVP
1993	John Tavares	Championship Game MVP
1994	John Tavares	Most Valuable Player
1996	Pat O'Toole	Championship Game MVP
2000	John Tavares	Most Valuable Player
2001	John Tavares	Most Valuable Player
2003	Darris Kilgour	Coach of the Year
2003	Kurt Silcott	GM of the Year
2005	Steve Dietrich	Goaltender of the Year
2006	Steve Dietrich	Goaltender of the Year
2006	Steve Dietrich	Most Valuable Player
2007	Dave Zygaj	Executive of the Year
2008	Mark Steenhuis	Transition Player of the Year
2008	Mark Steenhuis	Champion's Cup MVP
2009	Billy Dee Smith	Defensive Player of the Year
2009	Ken Montour	Goaltender of the Year
2016	Steve Dietrich	GM of the Year
2016	Dhane Smith	Most Valuable Player
2018	Craig England	Teammate of the Year
2019	Matt Vinc	Goaltender of the Year
2019	John Tavares/Rich Kilgour	Coach of the Year
2019	Steve Dietrich	GM of the Year
2022	Matt Vinc	Goaltender of the Year
2022	Steve Dietrich	GM of the Year
2022	Dhane Smith	Most Valuable Player
2023	Dhane Smith	NLL Finals MVP
2024	Josh Byrne	Offensive Player of the Year
2024	Josh Byrne	Most Valuable Player
2024	Josh Byrne	NLL Finals MVP
2025	John Gurtler	Media Person of the Year
2025	Kyle Buchanan	Sportsmanship Award
2025	Dhane Smith	Offensive Player of the Year
2025	Ian MacKay	NLL Finals MVP

=== NLL Hall of Fame members ===
- Les Bartley, Head Coach, 2006
- Darris Kilgour, Forward, 2007
- John Mouradian, General Manager, 2008
- Jim Veltman, Defense, 2009
- Rich Kilgour, Transition, 2010
- Steve Dietrich, Goaltender, 2012
- Pat O'Toole, Goaltender, 2013
- Tracey Kelusky, Forward, 2016
- John Tavares, Forward, 2016
- Pat McCready, Defense, 2021
- Shawn Williams, Forward, 2021
- Mike Accursi, Forward, 2026
- Shawn Evans, Forward, 2026
- John Gurtler, Builder (play-by-play), 2026
- Mark Steenhuis, Forward, 2026

=== NLL records ===
==== Single-game record holders ====
- Most assists in a single game – Mark Steenhuis (13 assists, February 14, 2009)
- Most points in a single game – Mark Steenhuis (17 points, February 14, 2009)

==== Season record holders ====
- Most points in a single season – Dhane Smith (137 points, 2016)
- Most goals in a single season – Dhane Smith (72 goals, 2016)
- Most assists in a single season – Dhane Smith (103 assists, 2025)

==== All-time record holders ====
- Most goals in a career – John Tavares (724 goals, 1991–2015)
- Most assists in a career – John Tavares (823 assists, 1991–2015)
- Most points in a career – John Tavares (1,547 points, 1991–2015)
- Most saves in a career – Matt Vinc (8,299 saves 2005–2026)
- Most wins in a career – Matt Vinc (119 wins 2005–2026)
- Most minutes played – Matt Vinc (12,627:54 2005–2026)

==== NLL All-Star Game ====
- 2005: Kyle Couling, Mark Steenhuis, John Tavares*, Dan Teat
- 2006: Steve Dietrich, Mark Steenhuis, John Tavares*
- 2007: Pat McCready, Mark Steenhuis, John Tavares*
- 2008: Mark Steenhuis*, John Tavares*, Chris White
- 2009: Ken Montour*, Mark Steenhuis*, John Tavares, Roger Vyse, Chris White*
- 2011: Chris White, Mark Steenhuis, John Tavares, Brett Bucktooth
- 2012: Billy Dee Smith, Scott Self, Chris White, John Tavares, Mike Thompson

* – voted as starter

== Current roster ==
Buffalo Bandits roster
Active (21-man) roster		Inactive roster	Coaches
Goaltenders: 46 (Canada) Evan Constantopoulos; 48 (Canada) Matt Vinc; Defensemen: 77 (United States) Zack Belter; 93 (Canada) Carter Coffey; 6 (Canada) Paul Dawson; 12 (Canada) Mitch de Snoo; 44 (Canada) Tyler Hendrycks; 23 (Canada) Steve Priolo (C); 8 (Canada) Dylan Robinson; 25 (Canada) Matt Spanger; 5 (Canada) Cam Wyers	Forwards: 91 (Canada) Kyle Buchanan; 22 (Canada) Josh Byrne; 1 (Haudenosaunee) Tehoka Nanticoke; 15 (United States) Joe Resetarits; 81 (Haudenosaunee) Clay Scanlan; 92 (Canada) Dhane Smith (A); Transition: 41 (United States) Connor Farrell; 4 (Canada) Ian MacKay; 26 (Canada) Mike McCannell; 20 (Canada) Nick Weiss (A); 3 (Canada) Thomas Whitty	Practice squad: 19 (Canada) Taylor Dooley; 00 (Haudenosaunee) Waukiigan Shognosh; 87 (Canada) Coltrane Tyson; Unable to play: 94 (Canada) Bryce Sweeting	Head coach John Tavares Assistant coaches: Anthony Cosmo; Steve Dietrich; Eric Vinc; Legend: * Suspended list; (C) Captain; (A) Alternate captain; Roster updated 2026-3-21; NLL Transactions

== All-time record ==
Season	Division/ Conference (Note: Conference play began in the 2022 season)	W–L	Finish	Home	Road	GF	GA	Coach	Playoffs
1992	National	5–3	2nd	2–2	3–1	161	125	Bob McCready / Les Bartley	Champions
1993	National	8–0	1st	4–0	4–0	143	108	Les Bartley	Champions
1994	National	6–2	1st	3–1	3–1	121	99	Les Bartley	Lost final
1995		3–5	4th	2–2	1–3	109	108	Les Bartley	Lost semi-final
1996		8–2	1st	3–2	5–0	173	127	Les Bartley	Champions
1997		6–4	3rd	3–2	3–2	158	153	Les Bartley	Lost final
1998		6–6	4th	4–2	2–4	166	171	Les Wakeling	Lost semi-final
1999		4–8	6th	1–5	3–3	158	177	Les Wakeling	Did not qualify
2000		8–4	2nd	5–1	3–3	202	194	Ted Sawicki	Lost semi-final
2001		8–6	5th	4–3	4–3	248	218	Ted Sawicki	Did not qualify
2002	Central	8–8	4th	4–4	4–4	210	215	Ted Sawicki / Frank Neilson	Did not qualify
2003	Central	12–4	2nd	8–0	4–4	231	188	Darris Kilgour	Lost division final
2004	Eastern	8–8	3rd	4–4	4–4	205	198	Darris Kilgour	Lost final
2005	Eastern	11–5	2nd	5–3	6–2	217	183	Darris Kilgour	Lost division semi-final
2006	Eastern	11–5	1st	6–2	5–3	193	167	Darris Kilgour	Lost final
2007	Eastern	10–6	2nd	6–2	4–4	207	188	Darris Kilgour	Lost division final
2008	Eastern	10–6	1st	7–2	3–4	203	174	Darris Kilgour	Champions
2009	Eastern	10–6	2nd	5–3	5–3	223	170	Darris Kilgour	Lost division final
2010	Eastern	8–8	3rd	4–4	4–4	169	170	Darris Kilgour	Lost division semi-final
2011	Eastern	10–6	1st	4–4	6–2	169	159	Darris Kilgour	Lost division final
2012	Eastern	7–9	4th	4–4	3–5	198	204	Darris Kilgour	Lost division semi-final
2013	Eastern	6–10	4th	2–6	4–4	171	211	Darris Kilgour	Did not qualify
2014	Eastern	8–10	3rd	6–3	2–7	190	200	Troy Cordingley	Lost division final
2015	Eastern	11–7	3rd	7–2	4–5	236	208	Troy Cordingley	Lost division semi-final
2016	Eastern	13–5	1st	8–1	5–4	251	214	Troy Cordingley	Lost Finals
2017	Eastern	6–12	5th	3–6	3–6	226	251	Troy Cordingley	Did not qualify
2018	Eastern	8–10	5th	4–5	4–5	232	240	Troy Cordingley	Did not qualify
2019	Eastern	14–4	1st	7–2	7–2	244	186	John Tavares, Rich Kilgour	Lost Finals
2020	North	7–4	T-2nd	4–2	3–2	130	118	John Tavares	No playoffs held
2021	Eastern	Season cancelled due to COVID-19 pandemic							
2022	Eastern	14–4	1st	7–2	7–2	247	185	John Tavares	Lost Finals
2023	Eastern	14–4	1st	7–2	7–2	215	191	John Tavares	Champions
2024	Unified	11–7	4th	6–3	5–4	237	212	John Tavares	Champions
2025	Unified	13–5	1st	6–3	7–2	242	195	John Tavares	Champions
2026	Unified	11–7	5th	6–3	5–4	199	183	John Tavares	Lost Quarterfinal
Total	34 seasons	303–200		161–92	142–108	6,681	6,091		
Playoff totals	27 Appearances	45–26		34–10	11–16	892	783	7 Championships	

=== All-time team-by-team records ===
(active NLL franchises only)

	Home				Road				Overall
Team	GP	W	L	PCT	GP	W	L	PCT	GP	W	L	PCT
Calgary Roughnecks	8	6	2	.750	11	6	5	.545	19	12	7	.632
Colorado Mammoth	13	8	5	.615	11	4	7	.364	24	12	12	.500
as Washington Power	2	1	1	.500	2	2	0	1.000	4	3	1	.750
as Pittsburgh CrosseFire	0	0	0	—	1	0	1	.000	1	0	1	.000
as Baltimore Thunder	8	6	2	.750	5	4	1	.800	13	10	3	.769
Oshawa FireWolves	0	0	0	—	1	0	1	.000	1	0	1	.000
as Albany FireWolves	4	2	2	.500	4	2	2	.500	8	4	4	.500
as New England Black Wolves	5	3	2	.600	5	2	3	.400	10	5	5	.500
as Philadelphia Wings	27	15	12	.555	24	11	13	.458	51	26	25	.509
Georgia Swarm	9	4	5	.444	9	6	3	.667	18	10	8	.556
as Minnesota Swarm	14	12	2	.857	11	7	4	.636	25	19	6	.760
Halifax Thunderbirds	7	5	2	.714	5	3	2	.600	12	8	4	.667
as Rochester Knighthawks	32	16	16	.500	37	13	24	.351	69	29	40	.420
Las Vegas Desert Dogs	2	2	0	1.000	1	1	0	1.000	3	3	0	1.000
Rochester Knighthawks	6	6	0	1.000	6	4	2	.667	12	10	2	.833
San Diego Seals	3	2	1	.667	4	4	0	1.000	7	6	1	.857
Saskatchewan Rush	4	2	2	.500	5	5	0	1.000	9	7	2	.778
as Edmonton Rush	2	1	1	.500	4	1	3	.250	6	2	4	.333
Toronto Rock	37	19	18	.514	33	15	18	.454	70	34	36	.486
as Ontario Raiders	1	1	0	1.000	1	0	1	.000	2	1	1	.500
Vancouver Warriors	3	1	2	.333	3	2	1	.667	6	3	3	.500
as Vancouver Stealth	4	3	1	.750	4	3	1	.750	8	6	2	.750
as Washington Stealth	2	0	2	.000	3	2	1	.667	5	2	3	.400
as San Jose Stealth	1	1	0	1.000	1	1	0	1.000	2	2	0	1.000
as Albany Attack	4	3	1	.750	4	3	1	.750	8	6	2	.750
Total	198	120	78	.606	191	100	91	.524	389	220	169	.566

== Playoff results ==
Season	Game	Visiting	Home
1992	Division Semifinal	Boston Blazers 16	Buffalo Bandits 22
1992	Division Final	Buffalo Bandits 19	Detroit Turbos 16
1992	Championship	Buffalo Bandits 11	Philadelphia Wings 10 (OT)
1993	Division Final	Boston Blazers 10	Buffalo Bandits 12
1993	Championship	Philadelphia Wings 12	Buffalo Bandits 13
1994	Division Final	Detroit Turbos 10	Buffalo Bandits 16
1994	Championship	Philadelphia Wings 26	Buffalo Bandits 15
1995	Semifinals	Philadelphia Wings 19	Buffalo Bandits 16
1996	Semifinals	Rochester Knighthawks 10	Buffalo Bandits 18
1996	Championship	Philadelphia Wings 10	Buffalo Bandits 15
1997	Semifinals	New York Saints 10	Buffalo Bandits 19
1997	Championship	Rochester Knighthawks 15	Buffalo Bandits 12
1998	Semifinals	Buffalo Bandits 12	Philadelphia Wings 17
2000	Semifinals	Rochester Knighthawks 15	Buffalo Bandits 11
2003	Quarterfinals	Calgary Roughnecks 9	Buffalo Bandits 16
2003	Semifinals	Buffalo Bandits 13	Rochester Knighthawks 16
2004	Division Semifinal	Buffalo Bandits 13	Rochester Knighthawks 9
2004	Division Final	Buffalo Bandits 19	Toronto Rock 10
2004	Championship	Buffalo Bandits 11	Calgary Roughnecks 14
2005	Division Semifinal	Rochester Knighthawks 17	Buffalo Bandits 16
2006	Division Semifinal	Buffalo Bandits 11	Minnesota Swarm 10
2006	Division Final	Buffalo Bandits 15	Rochester Knighthawks 10
2006	Championship	Colorado Mammoth 16	Buffalo Bandits 9
2007	Division Semifinal	Minnesota Swarm 8	Buffalo Bandits 14
2007	Division Final	Buffalo Bandits 13	Rochester Knighthawks 14 (OT)
2008	Division Semifinal	Philadelphia Wings 12	Buffalo Bandits 14
2008	Division Final	New York Titans 12	Buffalo Bandits 19
2008	Championship	Portland LumberJax 13	Buffalo Bandits 14
2009	Division Semifinal	Boston Blazers 8	Buffalo Bandits 11
2009	Division Final	Buffalo Bandits 3	New York Titans 9
2010	Division Semifinal	Buffalo Bandits 11	Toronto Rock 13
2011	Division Semifinal	Boston Blazers 10	Buffalo Bandits 11
2011	Division Final	Buffalo Bandits 11	Toronto Rock 12
2012	Division Semifinal	Buffalo Bandits 6	Toronto Rock 7
2014	Division Semifinal	Buffalo Bandits 15	Toronto Rock 13
2014	Division Final 1	Rochester Knighthawks 8	Buffalo Bandits 12
2014	Division Final 2	Buffalo Bandits 8	Rochester Knighthawks 13
2014	Division Final 3	Buffalo Bandits 1	Rochester Knighthawks 2
2015	Division Semifinal	Buffalo Bandits 11	Rochester Knighthawks 14
2016	Division Final 1	Buffalo Bandits 15	New England Black Wolves 10
2016	Division Final 2	New England Black Wolves 15	Buffalo Bandits 20
2016	Championship 1	Saskatchewan Rush 11	Buffalo Bandits 9
2016	Championship 2	Buffalo Bandits 10	Saskatchewan Rush 11
2019	Division Semifinal	New England Black Wolves 6	Buffalo Bandits 13
2019	Division Final	Toronto Rock 8	Buffalo Bandits 12
2019	Championship 1	Calgary Roughnecks 10	Buffalo Bandits 7
2019	Championship 2	Buffalo Bandits 13	Calgary Roughnecks 14 (OT)
2022	Conference Semifinal	Albany FireWolves 5	Buffalo Bandits 10
2022	Conference Final 1	Toronto Rock 17	Buffalo Bandits 18
2022	Conference Final 2	Buffalo Bandits 10	Toronto Rock 9
2022	Championship 1	Colorado Mammoth 14	Buffalo Bandits 15
2022	Championship 2	Buffalo Bandits 8	Colorado Mammoth 11
2022	Championship 3	Colorado Mammoth 10	Buffalo Bandits 8
2023	Conference Semifinal	Rochester Knighthawks 8	Buffalo Bandits 20
2023	Conference Final 1	Toronto Rock 5	Buffalo Bandits 14
2023	Conference Final 2	Buffalo Bandits 17	Toronto Rock 8
2023	Championship 1	Colorado Mammoth 12	Buffalo Bandits 13
2023	Championship 2	Buffalo Bandits 10	Colorado Mammoth 16
2023	Championship 3	Colorado Mammoth 4	Buffalo Bandits 13
2024	Quarterfinals	Georgia Swarm 9	Buffalo Bandits 10 (OT)
2024	Semi Final 1	Buffalo Bandits 12	Toronto Rock 4
2024	Semi Final 2	Toronto Rock 8	Buffalo Bandits 12
2024	Championship 1	Buffalo Bandits 12	Albany FireWolves 8
2024	Championship 2	Albany FireWolves 13	Buffalo Bandits 15
2025	Quarterfinals	San Diego Seals 4	Buffalo Bandits 5
2025	Semi Final 1	Vancouver Warriors 3	Buffalo Bandits 9
2025	Semi Final 2	Buffalo Bandits 11	Vancouver Warriors 9
2025	Championship 1	Saskatchewan Rush 10	Buffalo Bandits 12
2025	Championship 2	Buffalo Bandits 10	Saskatchewan Rush 11
2025	Championship 3	Saskatchewan Rush 6	Buffalo Bandits 15
2026	Quarterfinals	Buffalo Bandits 10	Georgia Swarm 17

=== All-time team-by-team playoff records ===
(Active NLL franchises only)

	Home				Road				Overall
Team	GP	W	L	PCT	GP	W	L	PCT	GP	W	L	PCT
Calgary Roughnecks	1	1	1	.500	2	0	2	.000	3	1	2	.333
Colorado Mammoth	5	3	2	.600	2	0	2	.000	7	3	4	.429
Georgia Swarm	1	1	0	1.000	1	0	1	.000	2	1	1	.500
Rochester Knighthawks	1	1	0	1.000	0	0	0	—	1	1	0	1.000
San Diego Seals	1	1	0	1.000	0	0	0	—	1	1	0	1.000
Saskatchewan Rush	3	2	1	.667	2	0	2	.000	5	2	3	.400
Toronto Rock	5	4	1	.800	7	5	2	.714	12	9	3	.750
Vancouver Warriors	1	1	0	1.000	1	1	0	1.000	2	2	0	1.000
Total	18	14	4	.778	15	6	9	.400	33	20	13	.606

== Head coaching history ==
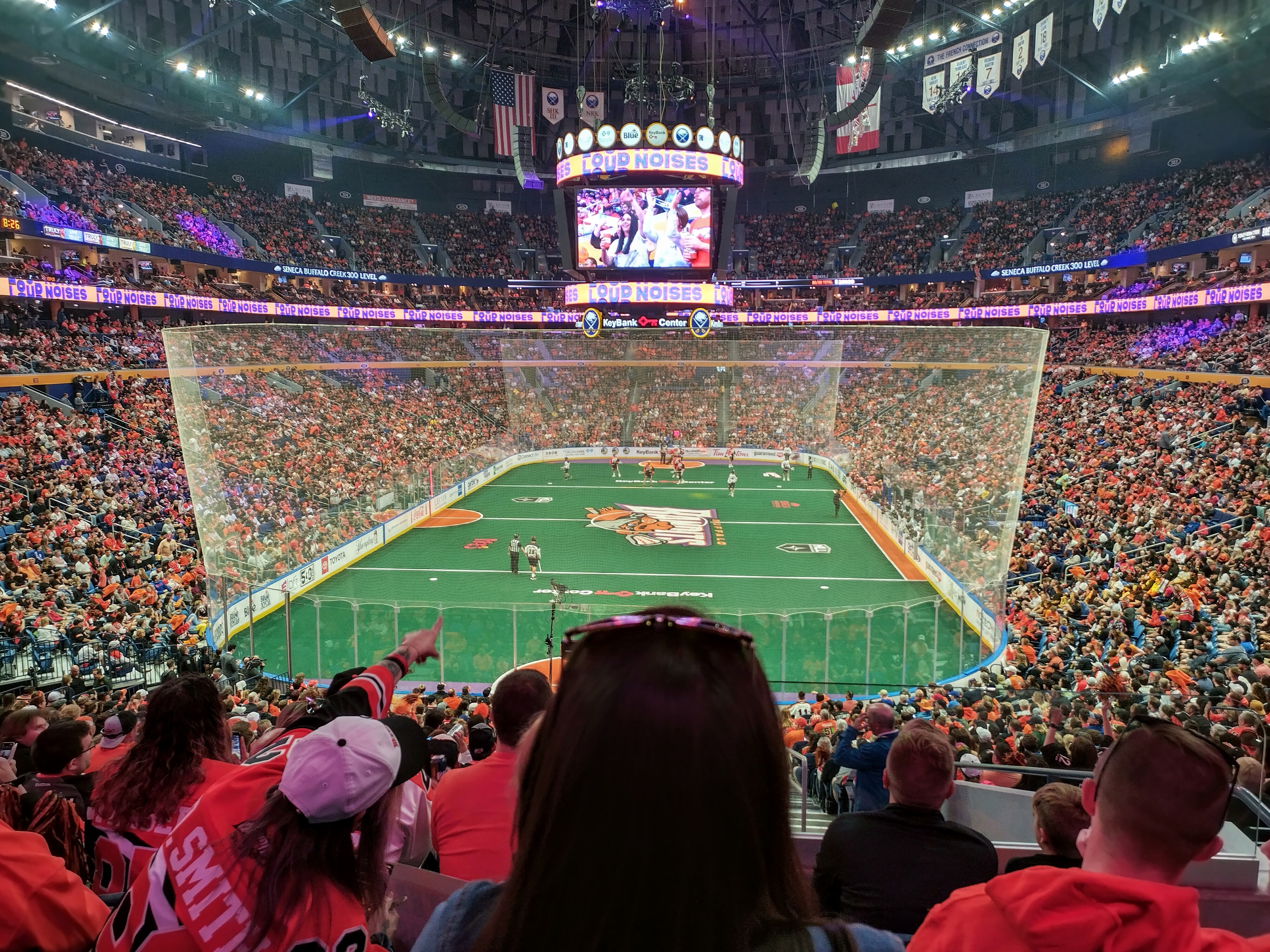
The Colorado Mammoth visit the Buffalo Bandits in Game 3 of the 2022 NLL Cup Finals

#	Name	Term	Regular season				Playoffs			
#	Name	Term	GC	W	L	W%	GC	W	L	W%
1	Bob McCready	1992	3	0	3	.000	—	—	—	—
2	Les Bartley	1992–1997	49	36	13	.735	12	9	3	.750
3	Les Wakeling	1998–1999	24	10	14	.417	1	0	1	.000
4	Ted Sawicki	2000–2002	35	21	14	.600	1	0	1	.000
5	Frank Neilson	2002	7	3	4	.429	—	—	—	—
6	Darris Kilgour	2003–2013	176	103	73	.585	20	11	9	.550
7	Troy Cordingley	2014–2018	90	46	44	.511	9	4	5	.444
8	John Tavares, Rich Kilgour	2019	18	14	4	.778	3	2	1	.666
9	John Tavares	2020–	101	70	31	.693	24	19	5	.792

== Draft history ==
=== NLL Entry Draft ===
First Round Selections

- 1991: Darris Kilgour (1st overall)
- 1992: Tom Marechek (6th overall)
- 1993: Gil Nieuwendyk (6th overall)
- 1994: Rodd Squire (5th overall)
- 1995: Jason Luke (3rd overall)
- 1996: Mike Murray (6th overall)
- 1997: Casey Zaph (7th overall) & Marty O'Brien (8th overall)
- 1998: Matt Disher (7th overall)
- 1999: None
- 2000: Ryan Powell (2nd overall)
- 2001: None
- 2002: Billy Dee Smith (3rd overall)
- 2003: A.J. Shannon (6th overall)
- 2004: Delby Powless (1st overall)
- 2005: Jeff Shattler (10th overall)
- 2006: Brett Bucktooth (3rd overall)
- 2007: None
- 2008: None
- 2009: Kyle Clancy (10th overall)
- 2010: Travis Irving (9th overall)
- 2011: None
- 2012: Dhane Smith (5th overall)
- 2013: None
- 2014: Brandon Goodwin (9th overall)
- 2015: None
- 2016: None
- 2017: Josh Byrne (1st overall)
- 2018: Matt Gilray (3rd overall) & Ian MacKay (4th overall)
- 2019: Brent Noseworthy (12th overall)
- 2020: Brad McCulley (9th overall)
- 2021: Tehoka Nanticoke (3rd overall) & Thomas Vaesen (14th overall)
- 2022: Cam Wyers (13th overall), Dylan Robinson (14th overall), Zack Belter (19th overall)
- 2023: None
- 2024: Lukas Nielsen (7th overall), Luca Antongiovanni (8th overall), Taylor Dooley (15th overall)
- 2025: Waukiigan Shognosh (14th overall)
- 2026: Dante Bowen (6th overall)

=== NLL Dispersal Draft ===
- 2002 from Montreal Express: Aime Caines (6th overall); Kelly Sullivan (18th overall)
- 2003 from Ottawa Rebel: Jason Clark (9th overall); Marc Landriault (20th overall); Mike Hamilton (31st overall)
- 2004 from Vancouver Ravens: Curt Malawsky (9th overall); Declined to pick (18th overall)
- 2005 from Anaheim Storm: Traded to Arizona (9th overall)
- 2007 from Arizona Sting & Boston Blazers: Craig Conn, Arizona (10th overall); Brian Croswell, Boston (15th overall); Joe Smith, Arizona (34th overall)
- 2008 from Arizona Sting: Greg Hinman (13th overall)
- 2008 from Chicago Shamrox: Cody Jacobs (12th overall); Cory Stringer (21st overall)
- 2009 from Portland LumberJax: Jamison Koesterer (9th overall)
- 2010 from Orlando Titans: Jesse Guerin (16th overall) & Matt Brown (26th overall)
- 2011 from Boston Blazers: Kevin Buchanan (6th overall) & Damon Edwards (15th overall)
- 2024 from Panther City Lacrosse Club: None (Traded to Philadelphia)
- 2026 from Ottawa Black Bears & Philadelphia Wings: Zach Higgins, Ottawa (9th overall); Dalton Young, Philadelphia (11th overall); Larson Sundown, Ottawa (21st overall); Scott Dominey, Philadelphia (23rd overall); Travis Longboat, Philadelphia (27th overall); Justin Sykes, Ottawa (33rd overall)

=== NLL Expansion Draft ===
- 1999 to Albany Attack: Troy Cordingley (3rd overall)
- 2001 to Calgary Roughnecks, New Jersey Storm, Vancouver Ravens & Columbus Landsharks: Rich Catton, Vancouver (3rd overall); Phil Wetherup, Columbus (4th overall); Andy Duden, Columbus (10th overall); Peter Talmo, New Jersey (21st overall)
- 2004 to Minnesota Swarm: Jason Clark (N/A overall)
- 2005 to Portland Lumberjax & Edmonton Rush: Mike Hominuck, Portland (1st overall); Thomas Montour, Portland (13th overall)
- 2006 to Chicago Shamrox & New York Titans: Bryan Kazarian, Chicago (13th overall); Jon Harasym, Portland (15th overall)
- 2007 to Boston Blazers: Brendan Thenhaus (7th overall)
- 2008 to Boston Blazers: Kyle Laverty (4th overall)
- 2018 to San Diego Seals & Philadelphia Wings: Vaughn Harris (15th overall); Davide DiRuscio (17th overall)
- 2019 to Rochester Knighthawks & New York Riptide: Shawn Evans (1st overall); Jordan Durston (2nd overall)
- 2021 to Panther City Lacrosse Club: Liam Patten (8th overall)
- 2022 to Las Vegas Desert Dogs: Connor Fields (2nd overall)

== Retired numbers ==
The Bandits have four retired numbers, three of which are represented at the Arena in the rafters with the Championship banners.

- 34 Thomas Gardner, western New York youth lacrosse organizer, March 20, 1999
- 43 Darris Kilgour, F, March 25, 2001
- 16 Rich Kilgour, D, April 16, 2011
- 11 John Tavares, F, March 11, 2016

== Game broadcasts ==
Buffalo Bandits games can be heard on Buffalo's Audacy stations, either WGR 550 AM or WWKB 1520 AM. John Gurtler, former play-by-play man for the Buffalo Sabres, handles announcing duties, while former Bandit Randy Mearns handles color commentary. During its existence from 2010 to 2021, Seneca Nation-owned WGWE in Little Valley simulcast Bandits games in the Southern Tier.

All games are broadcast on ESPN+. Select games can be found nationally on ESPN Linear Networks, and locally (to the Buffalo market) on WNLO CW23. The Bandits are a strong television draw for WNLO, outrating the CW programming that usually airs in prime time on that network.

== See also ==
- Buffalo Bandits seasons
- Buffalo Bandits all-time roster

== Footnotes and references ==
Preceded by Detroit Turbos	Major Indoor Lacrosse League Champions; 1992, 1993	Succeeded by Philadelphia Wings
Preceded by Philadelphia Wings	Major Indoor Lacrosse League Champions; 1996	Succeeded by Rochester Knighthawks
Preceded by Rochester Knighthawks	National Lacrosse League Champions; 2008	Succeeded by Calgary Roughnecks
Preceded by Colorado Mammoth	National Lacrosse League Champions; 2023, 2024, 2025	Succeeded by Toronto Rock
