= Steve Priolo =

Canadian lacrosse player

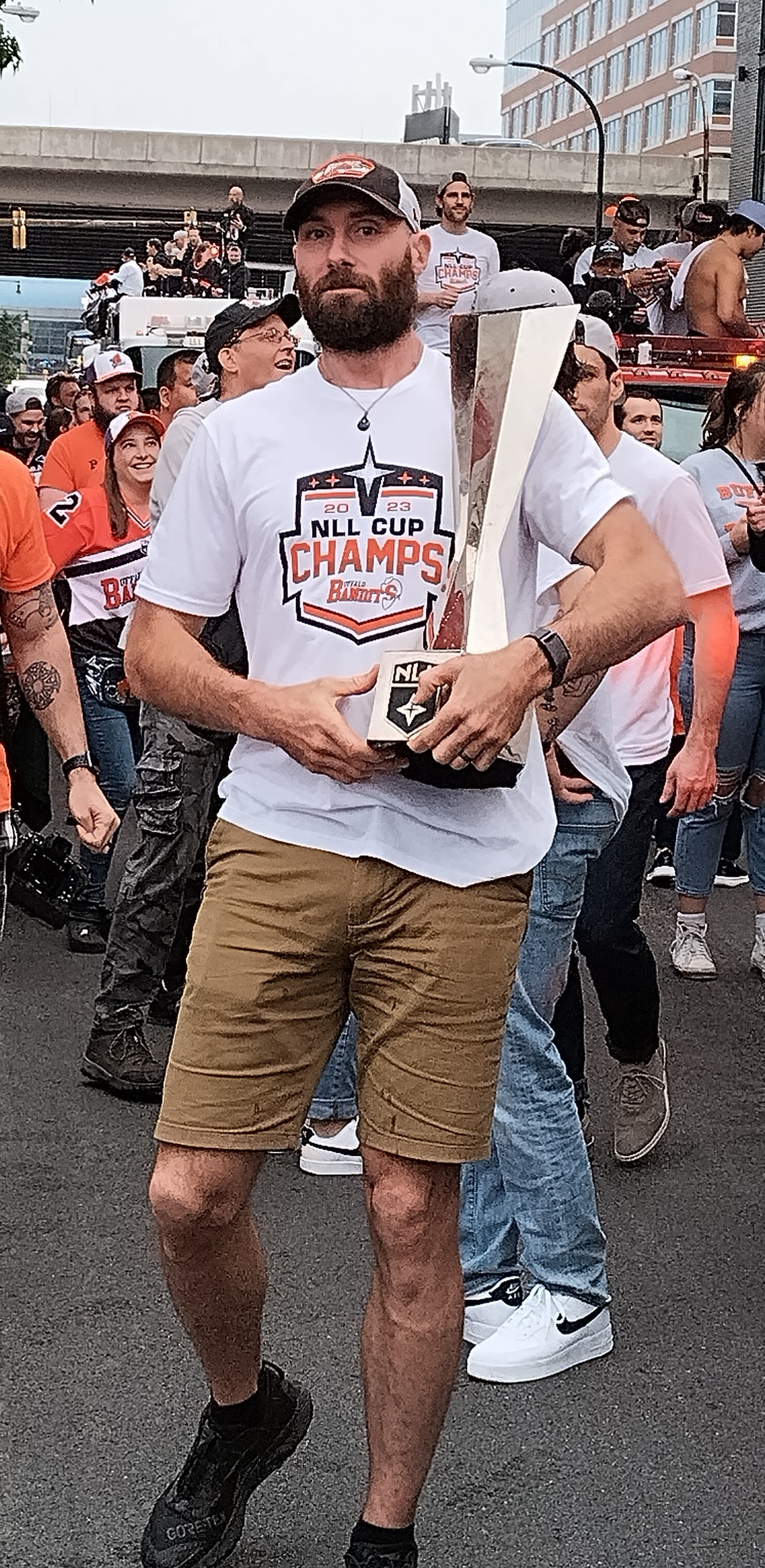

Personal information
- Born: January 15, 1989 (age 37) St. Catharines, Ontario, Canada
- Height: 6 ft 5 in (196 cm)
- Weight: 234 lb (106 kg; 16 st 10 lb)

Sport
- Position: Defense
- Shoots: Right
- NLL draft: 21st overall, 2009; Buffalo Bandits
- NLL team: Buffalo Bandits
- MSL team Former teams: Six Nations Chiefs; Brooklin Redmen
- Pro career: 2010–

Career highlights
- 3x NLL Cup Champion (2023, 2024, 2025)

Steve Priolo (born January 15, 1989) is a Canadian professional box lacrosse player for the Buffalo Bandits of the National Lacrosse League. Initially drafted by the Bandits in 2009, he gained a roster spot for the 2010 NLL season. A basketball and lacrosse standout at Holy Cross Catholic Secondary School, Priolo initially played basketball at the University of Windsor before transferring to Brock University, where he played lacrosse. Outside of the NLL, Priolo has played for the St. Catharines Athletics, St. Catharines Saints, and the Brooklin Redmen. He was a finalist for the NLL's Defensive Player of the Year Award in 2013 and 2014.

== Statistics ==
=== National Lacrosse League ===
Steve Priolo		Regular season									Playoffs								
Season	Team	GP	G	A	Pts	LB	PIM	Pts/GP	LB/GP	PIM/GP	GP	G	A	Pts	LB	PIM	Pts/GP	LB/GP	PIM/GP
2010	Buffalo Bandits	9	0	7	7	22	22	0.78	2.44	2.44	–	–	–	–	–	–	–	–	–
2011	Buffalo Bandits	14	0	6	6	44	38	0.43	3.14	2.71	2	0	0	0	6	4	0.00	3.00	2.00
2012	Buffalo Bandits	12	2	3	5	34	35	0.42	2.83	2.92	–	–	–	–	–	–	–	–	–
2013	Buffalo Bandits	16	2	5	7	76	46	0.44	4.75	2.88	–	–	–	–	–	–	–	–	–
2014	Buffalo Bandits	18	8	18	26	99	65	1.44	5.50	3.61	4	0	2	2	24	4	0.50	6.00	1.00
2015	Buffalo Bandits	18	5	15	20	104	48	1.11	5.78	2.67	1	0	0	0	4	0	0.00	4.00	0.00
2016	Buffalo Bandits	18	7	12	19	112	61	1.06	6.22	3.39	4	0	1	1	19	2	0.25	4.75	0.50
2017	Buffalo Bandits	18	7	15	22	131	27	1.22	7.28	1.50	–	–	–	–	–	–	–	–	–
2018	Buffalo Bandits	18	3	16	19	138	45	1.06	7.67	2.50	–	–	–	–	–	–	–	–	–
2019	Buffalo Bandits	18	11	15	26	135	21	1.44	7.50	1.17	4	2	8	10	37	2	2.50	9.25	0.50
2020	Buffalo Bandits	8	1	4	5	63	6	0.63	7.88	0.75	–	–	–	–	–	–	–	–	–
2022	Buffalo Bandits	16	3	15	18	116	20	1.13	7.25	1.25	6	2	5	7	61	6	1.17	10.17	1.00
2023	Buffalo Bandits	17	3	16	19	143	67	1.12	8.41	3.94	6	2	6	8	58	12	1.33	9.67	2.00
2024	Buffalo Bandits	18	5	8	13	120	30	0.72	6.67	1.67	5	0	4	4	35	2	0.80	7.00	0.40
2025	Buffalo Bandits	18	4	13	17	110	34	0.94	6.11	1.89	6	0	1	1	48	2	0.17	8.00	0.33
2026	Buffalo Bandits	18	6	12	18	98	31	1.00	5.44	1.72	–	–	–	–	–	–	–	–	–
		254	67	180	247	1,545	596	0.97	6.08	2.35	38	6	27	33	292	34	0.87	7.68	0.89
Career Total:		292	73	207	280	1,837	630	0.96	6.29	2.16									

GP–Games played; G–Goals; A–Assists; Pts–Points; LB–Loose balls; PIM–Penalty minutes; Pts/GP–Points per games played; LB/GP–Loose balls per games played; PIM/GP–Penalty minutes per games played.
