= Ian MacKay =

Canadian lacrosse player (born 1994)

Personal information
- Nickname: Mickey
- Born: May 31, 1994 (age 32) Port Elgin, Ontario
- Height: 5 ft 10 in (178 cm)
- Weight: 216 lb (98 kg; 15 st 6 lb)

Sport
- Position: Forward/Transition (Box), Midfield (Field)
- Shoots: Left
- NCAA team: Vermont (2018)
- NLL draft: 4th overall, 2018; Buffalo Bandits
- NLL team: Buffalo Bandits
- PLL team Former teams: Carolina Chaos; Archers Lacrosse Club; Chesapeake Bayhawks
- Pro career: 2019–

Career highlights
- NLL: 3x NLL Cup Champion (2023, 2024, 2025); NLL Cup Finals MVP (2025); 1x Second Team All-League (2024); All-Rookie Team (2019); PLL: 1x Champion (2021)
Medal record
Representing Canada
Men's field lacrosse
World Lacrosse Championship
Runner-up	2018 Netanya
Men's box lacrosse
World Lacrosse Box Championships
Winner	2024 Utica

Ian MacKay (born May 31, 1994) is a Canadian professional lacrosse player for the Buffalo Bandits of the National Lacrosse League. He is also a player for the Carolina Chaos of the Premier Lacrosse League. He also plays for the Canadian men's indoor lacrosse team.

== Early life ==
MacKay grew up in Port Elgin, Ontario, where he attended The Hill Academy. He played collegiate lacrosse for the University of Vermont. At Vermont, MacKay was a two-time team captain, a three-time all-conference selection, and a two-time All-American selection.

MacKay left Vermont as the program's all-time leading goal scorer (150), fifth-most in assists (80), and third-most in points (230) between 2014 and 2018.

== Professional career ==
=== NLL ===
MacKay was selected fourth overall in the 2018 NLL Entry Draft by the Buffalo Bandits. In his rookie season with the Bandits, MacKay scored 11 goals and 21 assists for 32 points in 18 games. He was named a finalist for the NLL's Rookie of the Year Award, and was named to the NLL All-Rookie Team. On October 3, 2023, MacKay signed a three-year contract extension with the Bandits.

MacKay remained a transition player through the 2024 season, but switched to being a bigger part of the Bandits' offense going into the 2025 season. MacKay recorded a career-high 37 goals for Buffalo in the 2025 regular season after making the transition.

MacKay was named NLL Finals MVP after the Bandits won their third-straight NLL championship in 2025. He recorded seven goals and five assists in the three-game championship series over the Saskatchewan Rush. He also led the team in scoring during the playoffs, with 16 goals in six playoff games.

On July 8, 2026, MacKay signed a three-year contract to remain with the Bandits.

=== PLL ===
MacKay was drafted 13th overall by the Chesapeake Bayhawks of Major League Lacrosse in 2018, where he recorded 12 points in 5 games.

He then joined the Archers Lacrosse Club of the Premier Lacrosse League in 2019. After two seasons with Archers, he was traded to the Chaos Lacrosse Club prior to the 2021 season.

== Career stats ==
NCAA:

Team	Season	GP	GS	G	A	Pts	Sh	GB
Vermont	2014	13	12	28	14	42	122	30
Vermont	2015	16	16	41	18	59	170	31
Vermont	2016	17	17	42	28	70	162	38
Vermont	2018	16	12	39	20	59	130	20
Career		62	57	150	80	230	584	119

NLL:

Ian MacKay		Regular season									Playoffs								
Season	Team	GP	G	A	Pts	LB	PIM	Pts/GP	LB/GP	PIM/GP	GP	G	A	Pts	LB	PIM	Pts/GP	LB/GP	PIM/GP
2019	Buffalo Bandits	18	11	21	32	88	8	1.78	4.89	0.44	4	1	1	2	15	7	0.50	3.75	1.75
2020	Buffalo Bandits	11	7	4	11	93	16	1.00	8.45	1.45	–	–	–	–	–	–	–	–	–
2022	Buffalo Bandits	17	11	12	23	104	16	1.35	6.12	0.94	6	4	8	12	43	4	2.00	7.17	0.67
2023	Buffalo Bandits	18	19	19	38	121	16	2.11	6.72	0.89	6	5	11	16	40	6	2.67	6.67	1.00
2024	Buffalo Bandits	18	12	17	29	160	16	1.61	8.89	0.89	5	3	8	11	35	7	2.20	7.00	1.40
2025	Buffalo Bandits	18	37	17	54	94	16	3.00	5.22	0.89	6	16	8	24	27	0	4.00	4.50	0.00
2026	Buffalo Bandits	16	24	34	58	82	28	3.63	5.13	1.75	1	3	2	5	8	0	5.00	8.00	0.00
		116	121	124	245	742	116	2.11	6.40	1.00	28	32	38	70	168	24	2.50	6.00	0.86
Career Total:		144	153	162	315	910	140	2.19	6.32	0.97									

GP–Games played; G–Goals; A–Assists; Pts–Points; LB–Loose balls; PIM–Penalty minutes; Pts/GP–Points per games played; LB/GP–Loose balls per games played; PIM/GP–Penalty minutes per games played.

MLL:

Season	Team	Regular season											Playoffs										
Season	Team	GP	G	2PG	A	Pts	Sh	GB	Pen	PIM	FOW	FOA	GP	G	2PG	A	Pts	Sh	GB	Pen	PIM	FOW	FOA
2018	Chesapeake Bayhawks	5	10	1	1	12	32	3	0	0	0	0	–	–	–	–	–	–	–	–	–	–	–
		5	10	1	1	12	32	3	0	0	0	0	0	0	0	0	0	0	0	0	0	0	0
Career total:		5	10	1	1	12	32	3	0	0	0	0											

GP–Games played; G–Goals; 2PG–2-point goals; A–Assists; Pts–Points; Sh–Shots; GB–Ground balls; Pen–Penalties; PIM–Penalty minutes; FOW–Faceoffs won; FOA–Faceoffs attempted

PLL:

Season	Team	Regular season											Playoffs										
Season	Team	GP	G	2PG	A	Pts	Sh	GB	Pen	PIM	FOW	FOA	GP	G	2PG	A	Pts	Sh	GB	Pen	PIM	FOW	FOA
2019	Archers	4	2	0	1	3	11	1	0	0	0	0	1	0	0	0	0	3	1	0	0	0	0
2020	Archers	6	2	1	1	4	21	4	0	0	1	3	–	–	–	–	–	–	–	–	–	–	–
2021	Chaos	9	3	3	0	6	13	18	6	5.5	0	0	3	0	0	1	1	1	4	0	0	0	0
2022	Chaos	5	0	0	0	0	4	1	2	1.5	0	1	3	0	0	0	0	1	1	0	0	0	0
2023	Chaos	9	7	1	3	11	26	6	5	3	0	0	1	0	0	0	0	2	1	0	0	0	0
2024	Chaos	9	6	0	1	7	19	9	5	5	0	6	2	0	0	1	1	6	0	1	1	0	0
		42	20	5	6	31	94	39	18	15	1	10	10	0	0	2	2	7	7	1	1	0	0
Career total:		52	20	5	8	33	101	46	19	16	1	10											

GP–Games played; G–Goals; 2PG–2-point goals; A–Assists; Pts–Points; Sh–Shots; GB–Ground balls; Pen–Penalties; PIM–Penalty minutes; FOW–Faceoffs won; FOA–Faceoffs attempted
