= Tehoka Nanticoke =

Haudenosaunee lacrosse player

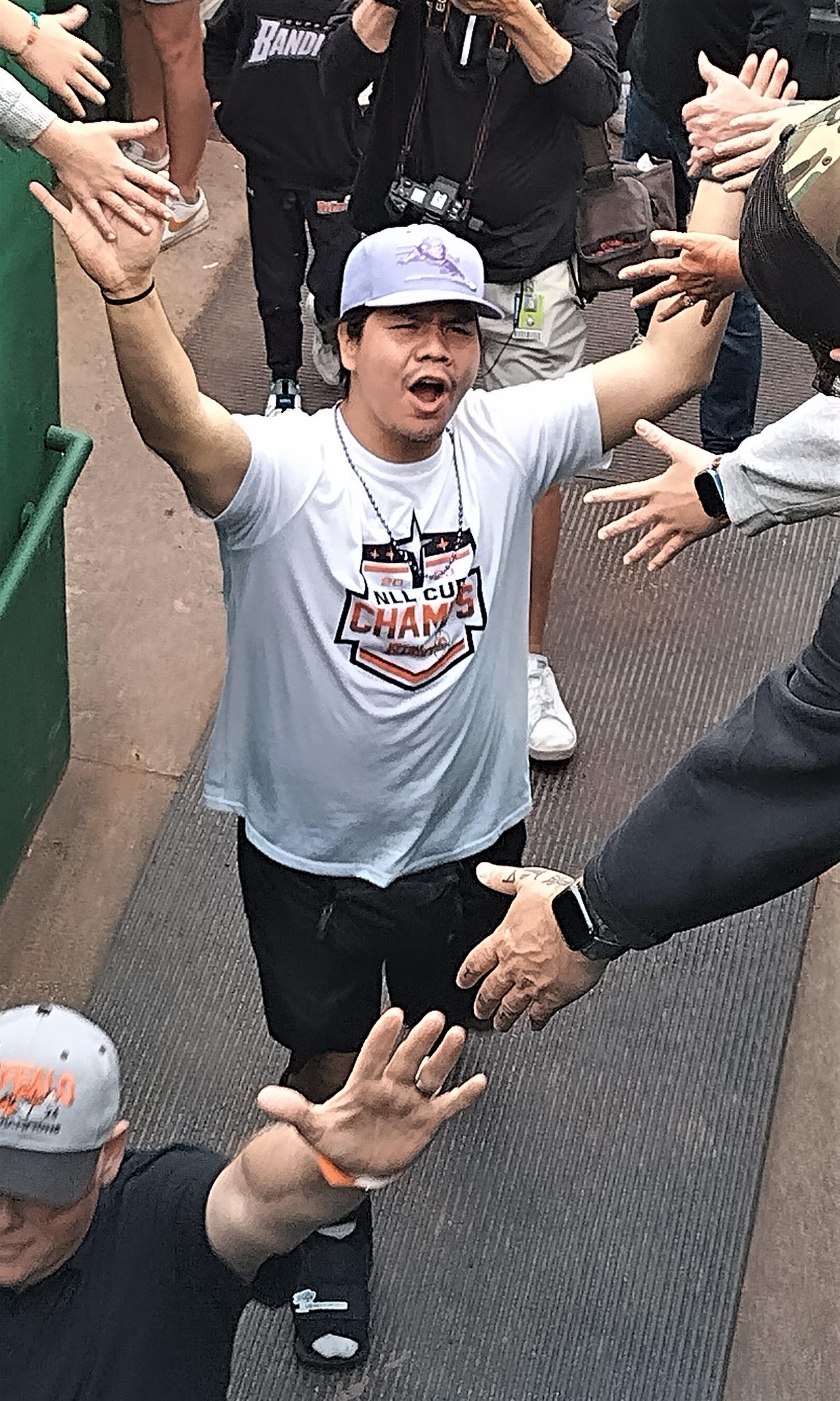
- Nanticoke with the Buffalo Bandits in 2023

Personal information
- Nationality: Six Nations of the Grand River First Nation
- Born: January 18, 1998 (age 28) Six Nations, Ontario, Canada
- Height: 6 ft 2 in (188 cm)
- Weight: 230 lb (100 kg; 16 st 6 lb)

Sport
- Position: Attack (Field), Forward (Box)
- Shoots: Right
- NCAA team: Albany (2021)
- NLL draft: 3rd overall, 2021; Buffalo Bandits
- NLL team: Buffalo Bandits
- PLL team: Carolina Chaos
- Pro career: 2021–
Medal record
Representing Haudenosaunee
Men's lacrosse
World Lacrosse Championship
Third place	2018 Netanya
Third place	2023 San Diego
World Indoor Lacrosse Championship
Runner-up	2019 Langley

Tehoka Nanticoke (born 18 January 1998) is a Haudenosaunee professional lacrosse player who plays for the Buffalo Bandits of the National Lacrosse League (NLL) and the Carolina Chaos of the Premier Lacrosse League (PLL). Nanticoke has become popular on the internet due to his trick shots and skill. He is also an assistant coach for the Women's Lacrosse team at Niagara University.

== Early life ==
Nanticoke was born on the Six Nations Reserve in Ontario. From an early age, he was taught to play lacrosse by his brother, Chancey Hill, who is 10 years older than him. Hill taught Nanticoke many nontraditional moves and shots that Nanticoke incorporated into his game. Early on, he was scouted and recruited to the IMG Academy in Bradenton, Florida, where he became one of the team's standout players. In 2016 he committed to play for the University at Albany. Nanticoke was considered the number one recruit in 2017 for college lacrosse.

== College career ==
Nanticoke initially did not consider going to college to play lacrosse, but after encouragement from his mother, Catherine, he chose to play at the University of Albany, as he was drawn to the attack minded playing style of coach Scott Marr. In 2018, Nanticoke finished his first season at Albany with 49 goals and 32 assists. The following fall semester, Nanticoke did not take part in the lacrosse team, as he was not enrolled in the university. According to head coach Marr, Nanticoke had stayed home due to 'personal reasons', although he added that he expected Nanticoke to rejoin the team for the Spring 2019 season. On March 31, 2021, it was reported that Nanticoke was dismissed from the UAlbany men's lacrosse program, and he did not return.

== Professional career ==
Nanticoke was drafted third overall in the 2021 NLL Draft by the Buffalo Bandits. He was a key part of the Bandits' three consecutive championships from 2023 to 2025.

Nanticoke was claimed from the PLL player pool by Chaos on March 5, 2022.

== Coaching career ==
Before the start of the 2024 Women's Collegiate lacrosse season, Nanticoke was named an assistant coach for the Niagara University Purple Eagles. He helped Head Coach Wendy Stone lead the Purple Eagles to a 16–4 overall record on route to the program's first conference championship and NCAA tournament appearance. He loves the celebrations the Purple Eagles bench does, led by Delaney Banks.

=== NLL stats ===
Tehoka Nanticoke		Regular season									Playoffs								
Season	Team	GP	G	A	Pts	LB	PIM	Pts/GP	LB/GP	PIM/GP	GP	G	A	Pts	LB	PIM	Pts/GP	LB/GP	PIM/GP
2022	Buffalo Bandits	18	32	19	51	53	47	2.83	2.94	2.61	6	6	8	14	16	6	2.33	2.67	1.00
2023	Buffalo Bandits	13	21	18	39	31	26	3.00	2.38	2.00	6	15	8	23	18	6	3.83	3.00	1.00
2024	Buffalo Bandits	16	27	16	43	37	10	2.69	2.31	0.63	5	6	6	12	10	2	2.40	2.00	0.40
2025	Buffalo Bandits	16	18	15	33	38	10	2.06	2.38	0.63	6	2	11	13	9	6	2.17	1.50	1.00
2026	Buffalo Bandits	16	21	16	37	39	23	2.31	2.44	1.44	1	0	1	1	7	0	1.00	7.00	0.00
		79	119	84	203	198	116	2.57	2.51	1.47	24	29	34	63	60	20	2.63	2.50	0.83
Career Total:		103	148	118	266	258	136	2.58	2.50	1.32									

GP–Games played; G–Goals; A–Assists; Pts–Points; LB–Loose balls; PIM–Penalty minutes; Pts/GP–Points per games played; LB/GP–Loose balls per games played; PIM/GP–Penalty minutes per games played.

== International career ==
Nanticoke is a member of the Haudenosaunee Nationals and has represented the under-19 side at the 2016 FIL U-19 World Championship. He is now a part of the 2019 FIL Indoor World Championship team playing for the Haudenosaunee Nationals.

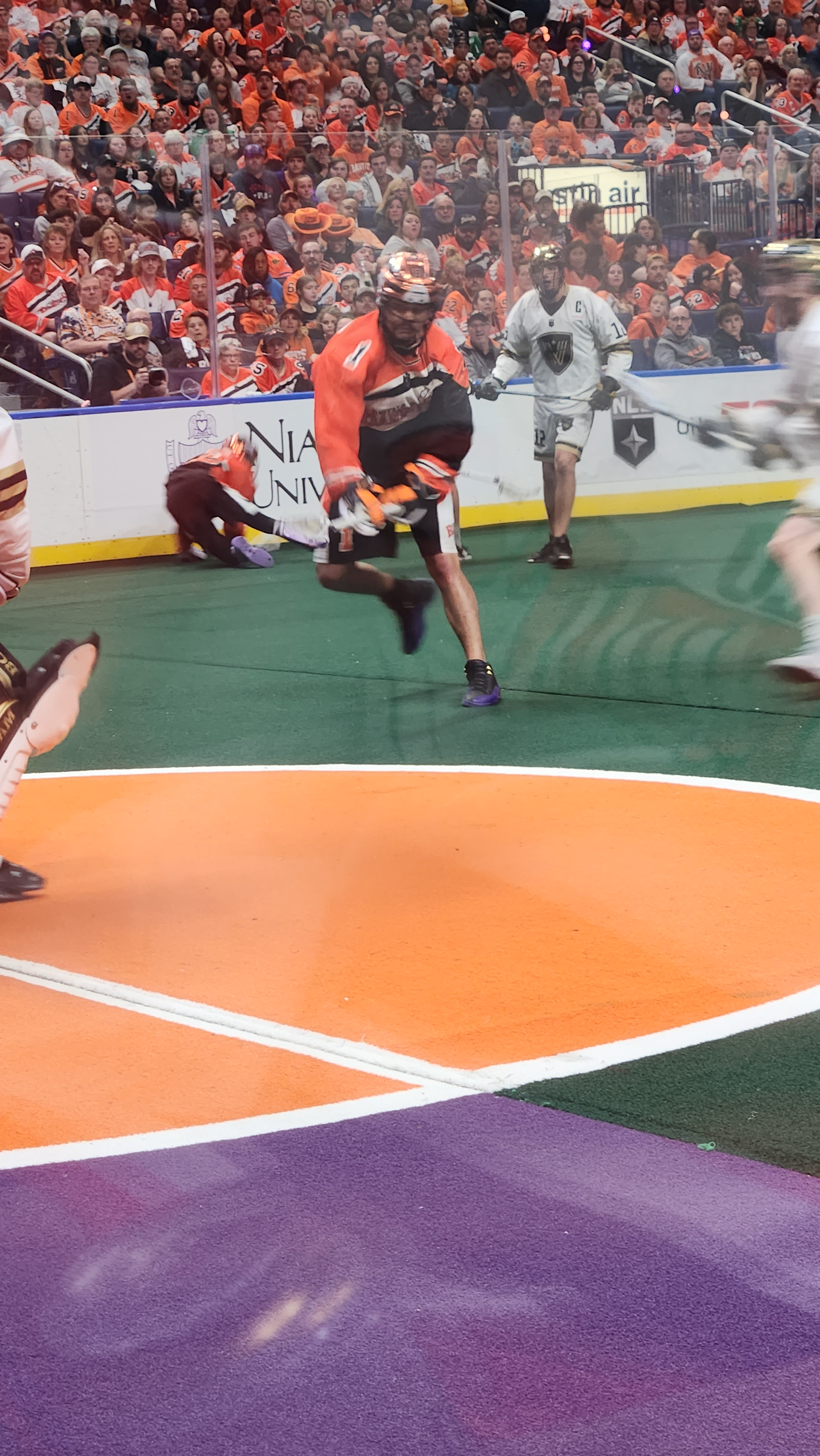
Nanticoke during the 2025 NLL Playoffs

== Style of play ==
Nanticoke is known as an extremely skillful and talented player. He gained popularity online, even in his highschool days for his moves and trick shots. In 2017, he made ESPN's top ten plays for a one handed behind the back and between the legs goals while at IMG Academy. He is also known as an extremely physical player. He weighs more than 200 pounds and is often capable of outmuscling opposing defences.

At times, Nanticoke had been criticized for overly physical play and taking cheap shots at opponents, with his cross-checking penalty in the third period described as one of the turning points in UAlbany's semifinal defeat to Yale in the 2018 NCAA Tournament.

== Personal life ==
He is a member of the Mohawk Nation. He was one of eight Indigenous players on the Albany roster for the 2018 season. Nanticoke comes from a deeply political and cultural family with many of his grandparents being faith keepers, or stewards of culture, language, and tradition in Mohawk society. His grandfather took part in the protests at Wounded Knee, South Dakota. His mother spent a year of her childhood summer at the Occupation of Alcatraz. Nanticoke is profoundly influenced by his cultural heritage as he refuses to cut his hair, believes in the spiritual qualities of lacrosse or the "Medicine Game", is a practitioner of the Longhouse Religion, and is fluent in Mohawk.
