= Nick Weiss =

Buffalo Bandits professional lacrosse player

Personal information
- Born: August 16, 1992 (age 33) Port Hope, Ontario, Canada
- Height: 6 ft 2 in (188 cm)
- Weight: 207 lb (94 kg; 14 st 11 lb)

Sport
- Position: Transition
- Shoots: Right
- NLL draft: 17th overall, 2013; Vancouver Stealth
- NLL team Former teams: Buffalo Bandits; Vancouver Stealth
- MSL team: Peterborough Lakers (2014-present)
- Pro career: 2014–

Career highlights
- NLL: 3x Champion (2023, 2024, 2025)

Nick Weiss (born August 16, 1992) is a Canadian professional box lacrosse player for the Buffalo Bandits of the National Lacrosse League and the Peterborough Lakers of Major Series Lacrosse. Hailing from Port Hope, Ontario, Weiss began his career with the Peterborough Junior Lakers of the Ontario Junior A Lacrosse League, with whom he played from 2010 to 2013, before being called up to the MSL Lakers in 2014.

Weiss was drafted in the second round of the 2013 NLL Entry Draft by the Vancouver Stealth, and played in fifteen games in his rookie year. He was dealt, along with some draft picks, to the Buffalo Bandits in exchange for defenseman Rory Smith and goaltender Eric Penney, as well as a first round pick in the 2014 Draft.

Weiss has also played junior hockey in a variety of leagues. He ended his Junior hockey career with the Port Hope Panthers in the Ontario Hockey Association in the Empire B Junior C Hockey League.

Weiss is also an avid hunter and fisherman in Central Ontario.

== Statistics ==
Nick Weiss		Regular season									Playoffs								
Season	Team	GP	G	A	Pts	LB	PIM	Pts/GP	LB/GP	PIM/GP	GP	G	A	Pts	LB	PIM	Pts/GP	LB/GP	PIM/GP
2014	Vancouver Stealth	15	7	6	13	86	18	0.87	5.73	1.20	–	–	–	–	–	–	–	–	–
2015	Buffalo Bandits	17	7	5	12	92	33	0.71	5.41	1.94	1	1	0	1	4	2	1.00	4.00	2.00
2016	Buffalo Bandits	10	6	4	10	78	17	1.00	7.80	1.70	4	1	5	6	22	4	1.50	5.50	1.00
2017	Buffalo Bandits	9	3	6	9	41	21	1.00	4.56	2.33	–	–	–	–	–	–	–	–	–
2018	Buffalo Bandits	18	9	13	22	114	23	1.22	6.33	1.28	–	–	–	–	–	–	–	–	–
2019	Buffalo Bandits	18	5	9	14	107	41	0.78	5.94	2.28	4	1	1	2	16	4	0.50	4.00	1.00
2020	Buffalo Bandits	8	4	4	8	30	4	1.00	3.75	0.50	–	–	–	–	–	–	–	–	–
2022	Buffalo Bandits	13	3	7	10	48	18	0.77	3.69	1.38	6	1	2	3	27	11	0.50	4.50	1.83
2023	Buffalo Bandits	18	6	14	20	117	14	1.11	6.50	0.78	6	0	5	5	32	14	0.83	5.33	2.33
2024	Buffalo Bandits	18	5	24	29	113	31	1.61	6.28	1.72	5	1	4	5	26	5	1.00	5.20	1.00
2025	Buffalo Bandits	18	7	19	26	138	47	1.44	7.67	2.61	6	1	7	8	46	4	1.33	7.67	0.67
2026	Buffalo Bandits	15	5	13	18	110	36	1.20	7.33	2.40	1	0	0	0	12	2	0.00	12.00	2.00
		177	67	124	191	1,074	303	1.08	6.07	1.71	33	6	24	30	185	46	0.91	5.61	1.39
Career Total:		210	73	148	221	1,259	349	1.05	6.00	1.66									

GP–Games played; G–Goals; A–Assists; Pts–Points; LB–Loose balls; PIM–Penalty minutes; Pts/GP–Points per games played; LB/GP–Loose balls per games played; PIM/GP–Penalty minutes per games played.

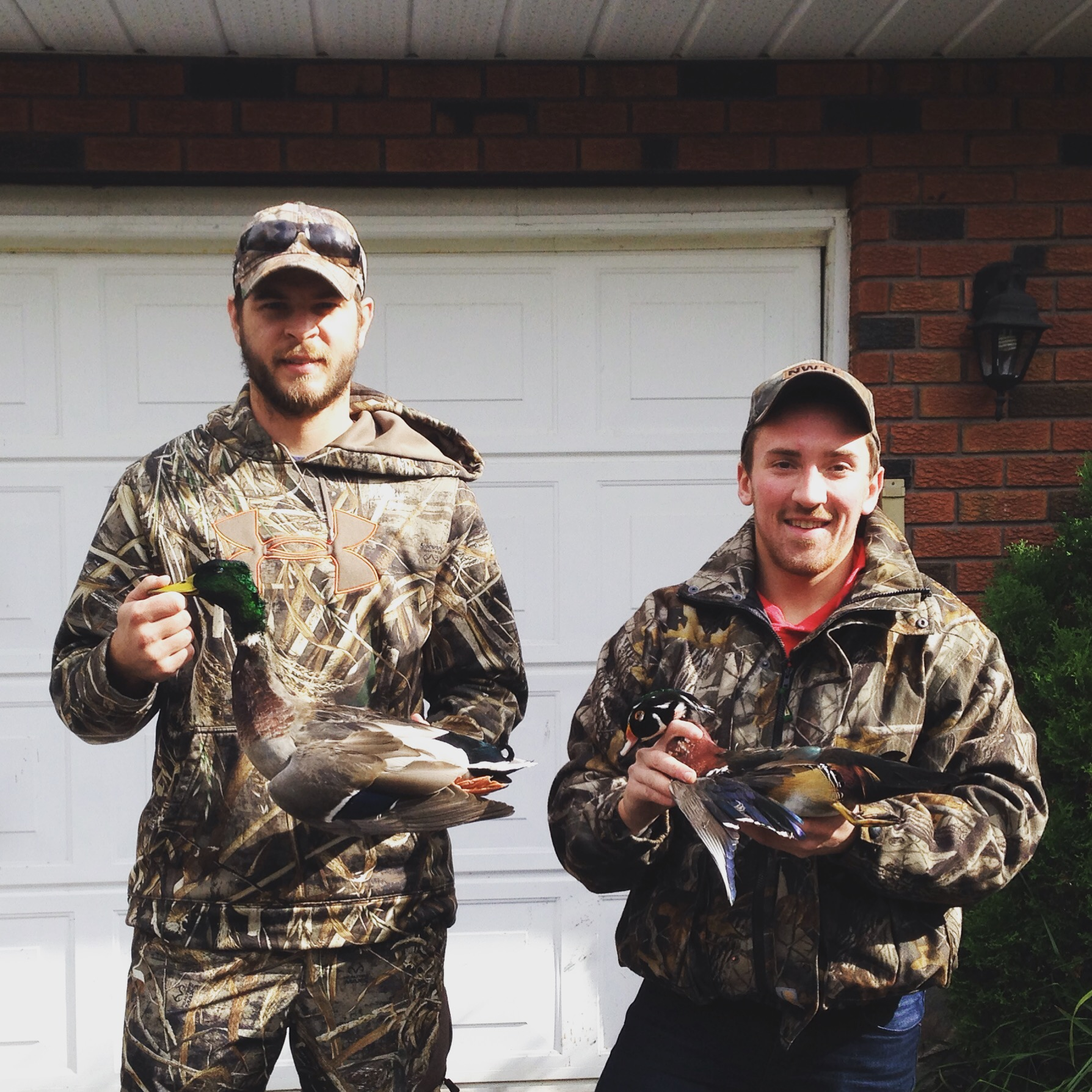
Weiss (left) shown here with a 3.3lb Drake Mallard Duck in Central Ontario
