= Matt Vinc =

Canadian lacrosse player

Personal information
- Nickname: Vino
- Nationality: Canadian
- Born: June 9, 1982 (age 44) St. Catharines, Ontario, Canada
- Height: 6 ft 2 in (188 cm)
- Weight: 220 lb (100 kg; 15 st 10 lb)

Sport
- Position: Goaltender
- Shoots: Right
- NLL draft: 6th overall, 2005; San Jose Stealth
- NLL team Former teams: Buffalo Bandits; Rochester Knighthawks; New York/Orlando Titans; San Jose Stealth
- MSL team Former teams: Peterborough Lakers; St. Catharines Athletics; Six Nations Chiefs; Brampton Excelsiors Victoria Shamrocks WLA
- Pro career: 2006–2026

Career highlights
- OJLL: OJLL Season MVP (2003); 3x Bob Meleville Memorial Award (fewest team goals against) (2001, 2002, 2003); B.W. Evans Award (Top Graduating Player) (2003); 3x Playoffs MVP (2000, 2001, 2002); Finals MVP (2001); 2x OJLL Champion; NCAA: Male Athlete of the Year; Canisius Hall of Fame; NLL: 8x Goaltender of the Year (2010, 2011, 2013, 2014, 2015, 2018, 2019, 2022); 5x All-Pro Team (2008, 2010, 2011, 2013, 2014); 6x NLL Champion (2012, 2013, 2014, 2023, 2024, 2025); Most career wins by a goaltender (182); Most career saves (11,823); Most career minutes played by a goaltender (17,836:49)

Matt Vinc (/vɪns/ VINSS; born June 9, 1982, in St. Catharines, Ontario) is a Canadian former professional box lacrosse goaltender who last played for the Buffalo Bandits of the National Lacrosse League (NLL). Vinc is widely considered the greatest box lacrosse goaltender of all time.

== Junior career ==
Vinc had an outstanding junior career. He played for the St. Catharines Athletics in the OLA Junior A Lacrosse League from 1999 to 2003. His accomplishments playing for the A's include:

- 1 OLA Jr.A regular season MVP award
- 3 OLA Jr.A playoff MVP awards
- 3 OLA Jr.A championships (2001–2003)
- 3 Bob Meleville Memorial Awards (lowest team total goals)
- 2 Minto Cup National championships (2001, 2003)
- 1 Minto Cup MVP Award
- B.W. Evans Award (Top Graduating Player).

== High school career ==
Vinc played high school field lacrosse at Holy Cross Catholic Secondary School, along with fellow future professional lacrosse players Billy Dee Smith, Craig Conn, and Sean Greenhalgh. In five years, he helped the Holy Cross Raiders to win 2 gold medals, 1 silver, and 1 bronze at the OFSAA field lacrosse championships. This would begin a dynasty for the Holy Cross lacrosse program to excel in Niagara and Ontario competition.

== College career ==
Vinc is also a graduate of Canisius University, where he played long-stick defense and was named the college's Male Athlete of the Year.

== NLL career ==
Vinc was acquired by the San Jose Stealth in the 2005 NLL entry draft in the first round (sixth overall). In the 2006 NLL season, Vinc played sparingly with the Stealth. Following the season, he was acquired by the New York Titans in the 2006 NLL expansion draft. In 2007, he took over the starting goaltender role for the Titans. In 2009, Vinc guided his team to a 10–6 record for a three way tie for first place in the Eastern Division with the Buffalo Bandits and the Boston Blazers. The Titans were awarded the Eastern Division regular season championship by way of tie breakers. On May 9, in the Eastern Division playoff championship game, Vinc stopped 41 out of 44 shots and kept the high-powered offense of the Buffalo Bandits to only three goals as the Titans defeated Buffalo 9–3. Vinc allowed 1 more goal than the National Lacrosse League playoff record of 2 goals against in a game, which was set by Bob Watson, and the Toronto Rock defeated the Philadelphia Wings 13–2 during a 1999 semi-final playoff game.

Vinc became a member of the Orlando Titans when the franchise moved to Florida for the 2010 season. When the team folded after that season, Vinc was chosen first overall in the dispersal draft, sending him to the Colorado Mammoth. As he teaches high school in St. Catharines, Ontario, however, he did not want to play in Colorado. In October 2010, he was thus traded to the Rochester Knighthawks in a significant trade that sent Vinc and transition player Matt Zash to Rochester in exchange for superstar attackman John Grant, Jr. and defenseman Mac Allen. Draft picks were also exchanged.

Vinc has won a league record eight Goaltender of the Year awards:

- 2010 with the Orlando Titans
- 2011, 2013, 2014, 2015, and 2018 with the Knighthawks
- 2019 and 2022 with the Bandits

Heading into the 2023 NLL season, Inside Lacrosse named Vinc the #2 goalie in the NLL.

== Statistics ==
=== NLL ===
Matt Vinc		Regular Season								Playoffs							
Season	Team	GP	Min	W	L	GA	GAA	Sv	Sv %	GP	Min	W	L	GA	GAA	Sv	Sv %
2006	San Jose Stealth	1	14:14	0	0	4	16.86	5	0.556	–	–	–	–	–	–	–	–
2007	New York Titans	13	712:15	3	9	157	13.23	419	0.727	–	–	–	–	–	–	–	–
2008	New York Titans	16	888:06	9	5	168	11.35	562	0.770	2	105:51	1	1	23	13.04	52	0.693
2009	New York Titans	16	916:11	9	6	173	11.33	609	0.779	3	182:16	2	1	25	8.23	110	0.815
2010	Orlando Titans	15	902:04	10	5	143	9.51	608	0.810	2	112:44	1	1	24	12.77	68	0.739
2011	Rochester Knighthawks	16	933:16	10	6	152	9.77	585	0.794	1	60:00	0	1	10	10.00	44	0.815
2012	Rochester Knighthawks	16	938:30	7	9	191	12.21	583	0.753	3	180:00	3	0	32	10.67	134	0.807
2013	Rochester Knighthawks	16	955:29	8	8	162	10.17	662	0.803	3	180:00	3	0	28	9.33	93	0.769
2014	Rochester Knighthawks	17	947:45	12	3	151	9.56	595	0.798	4	240:00	2	2	40	10.00	126	0.759
2015	Rochester Knighthawks	17	1,003:58	10	6	161	9.62	655	0.803	3	180:00	2	1	31	10.33	111	0.782
2016	Rochester Knighthawks	17	890:00	5	9	172	11.60	592	0.775	–	–	–	–	–	–	–	–
2017	Rochester Knighthawks	16	902:06	6	9	171	11.37	592	0.776	–	–	–	–	–	–	–	–
2018	Rochester Knighthawks	18	960:12	9	6	182	11.37	651	0.782	5	299:45	3	2	57	11.41	227	0.799
2019	Buffalo Bandits	18	1,036:24	14	2	173	10.02	705	0.803	4	238:57	2	2	37	9.29	160	0.812
2020	Buffalo Bandits	11	627:24	7	4	113	10.81	476	0.808	–	–	–	–	–	–	–	–
2022	Buffalo Bandits	18	1,063:35	14	4	179	10.10	747	0.807	6	359:59	4	2	65	10.83	238	0.785
2023	Buffalo Bandits	18	1,047:39	14	4	182	10.42	742	0.803	6	347:03	5	1	51	8.82	249	0.830
2024	Buffalo Bandits	16	962:39	11	5	182	11.34	652	0.782	5	304:01	5	0	42	8.29	224	0.842
2025	Buffalo Bandits	18	1,080:51	13	5	193	10.71	729	0.791	6	360:00	5	1	43	7.17	239	0.848
2026	Buffalo Bandits	18	1,054:11	11	7	173	9.85	654	0.791	1	55:52	0	1	17	18.26	34	0.667
		311	17,836:49	182	112	3,182	10.70	11,823	0.788	54	3,206:28	38	16	525	9.82	2,109	0.801
Career Total:		365	21,043:17	220	128	3,707	10.57	13,932	0.790								

GP–Games played;Min–Minutes played;W–Wins;L–Losses;GA–Goals against;GAA–Goals against average;Sv–Number of saves;Sv %–Save percentage;

Preceded by Ken Montour	NLL Goaltender of the Year; 2010, 2011	Succeeded by Mike Poulin
Preceded by Mike Poulin	NLL Goaltender of the Year; 2013, 2014, 2015	Succeeded by Evan Kirk
Preceded by Dillon Ward	NLL Goaltender of the Year; 2018, 2019	Succeeded by Doug Jamieson
Preceded by Doug Jamieson	NLL Goaltender of the Year; 2022	Succeeded by Christian Del Bianco
Preceded by Toronto Rock	NLL Cup; 2012, 2013, 2014	Succeeded by Edmonton Rush
Preceded by Colorado Mammoth	NLL Cup; 2023, 2024, 2025	Succeeded by Incumbent
