= Kyle Buchanan =

American film journalist

Kyle Buchanan (born 1979-1980) is an American journalist. He writes primarily about film and often conducts interviews with figures from the entertainment industry. Buchanan especially focuses on awards season coverage.

Buchanan served as an editor at Vulture and New York magazine. From 2018 to 2026, he worked as a culture reporter at The New York Times, including as "The Projectionist" columnist. Buchanan also wrote the 2022 book Blood, Sweat & Chrome, about the production of Mad Max: Fury Road. In October 2026, he began a podcast called The Kyle Buchanan Show.

== Life and career ==
Buchanan graduated with a bachelor's degree from University of Southern California in 2002. The next year, Buchanan co-founded the Los Angeles-based digital zine Ostrich Ink, which he described as a "compendium of interesting true stories and interviews by the young and trod-upon of Los Angeles". It closed in 2006, but Buchanan wrote that it was the "catalyst" that helped him write for mainstream publications.

Buchanan was one of the three components—with editor Seth Abramovitch and fellow writer Stu VanAirsdale—for the Hollywood-focused blog Defamer, which owner Nick Denton effectively closed by a 2009 merge into Gawker. During the merge, Denton fired Buchanan and VanAirsdale. The three subsequently joined the revamped website Movieline, where Buchanan was cited as a notable critic of Andrew Jarecki's Catfish.

In 2010, Buchanan left Movieline to become the movie editor at the revamped website Vulture, part of New York magazine. He then joined The New York Times in 2018, to run the award season column "The Carpetbagger", which was originally written by David Carr.

After 8 years, Buchanan left the newspaper to launch The Kyle Buchanan Show podcast in October 2026. The series is structured around two weekly segments: "The Panel" and "The Profile". "The Panel" features a discussion between Buchanan and three industry figures on broad trends in Hollywood; in "The Profile", Buchanan has a one-on-one longform interview with a given star.

Buchanan also wrote Blood Sweat & Chrome, an oral history of the production of Mad Max: Fury Road. The book, which was authorized by director George Miller, was noted for its revelation of the troubled working relationship between stars Charlize Theron and Tom Hardy.
