= List of family relations in the National Lacrosse League =

This is a list of family relations of current and former National Lacrosse League players.

== Brothers ==
| Surname | Brothers | Country | Notes |
|---|---|---|---|
| Bergey | Jake and Josh | United States | |
| Bomberry | Cam, Cory, and Tim | Haudenosaunee | |
| Carnegie | Mike and Scott | Canada | |
| Currier | Josh and Zach | Canada | |
| Dawson | Dan and Paul | Canada | |
| Evans | Shawn, Steve, and Scott | Canada | |
| French | Mike and Paul | Canada | |
| Gait | Gary and Paul | Canada | Played together: 1991 & 1992 on the Detroit Turbos. 1993 & 1994 on the Philadelphia Wings. 2000 on the Pittsburgh CrossFire. 2001 & 2002 on the Washington Power. 2005 on the Colorado Mammoth |
| Goodwin | Justin and Brandon | Canada | |
| Greer | Bill and Zack | Canada | |
| Harnett | Greg and Jon | Canada | |
| Hossack | Graeme and Matt | Canada | |
| Hutchison | Drew and Dylan | Canada | |
| Jenner | Teddy and Fred | Canada | |
| Kilgour | Darris, Richie, and Travis | Haudenosaunee | |
| King | Jesse and Marshal | Canada | Played together on the Calgary Roughnecks from 2020 to 2022. |
| Kirst | Conner, Collin, and Cole | United States | Conner and Collin played together in 2024 for the Las Vegas Desert Dogs. |
| LeClair | Kellen and Liam | Canada | |
| Malawsky | Curt and Derek | Canada | |
| Martin | Spencer and Andrew | Canada | Played together for the Philadelphia Wings in 2004 and the San Jose Stealth in 2006. |
| Merrill | Brodie and Patrick | Canada | |
| Morgan | David, Richard, and Peter | Canada | |
| Mydske | Brett and Reid | Canada | |
| Noble | Jason and Jeremy | Canada | |
| Orleman | Kevin and Steven | Canada | |
| Peyser | Greg and Stephen | United States | |
| Powell | Casey and Ryan | United States | |
| Reinholdt | Reid and Tor | Canada | Played together in 2023 & 2024 for the Las Vegas Desert Dogs. |
| Resetarits | Frank and Joe | United States | |
| Sanderson (Players): | Ryan,Chris, Brandon, Phil, and Nate | Canada | |
| Sanderson (Coaches): | Terry, Lindsay, and Shane | Canada | |
| Self | Scott and Brad | Canada | |
| Snider | Geoff and Bob | Canada | |
| Squire | Kim and Rodd | Haudenosaunee | |
| Staats | Randy and Austin | Haudenosaunee | |
| Suddons | Derek and Wes | Canada | |
| Tavares | John and Peter | Canada | |
| Thompson | Lyle, Miles, Jerome and Jeremy | Haudenosaunee | Set Guinness World Record of "Most siblings to compete in same professional lacrosse game" 1/7/2017 Lyle and Miles played together on the Georgia Swarm from 2016 to 2025. Jerome, Lyle, and Miles played together on the Georgia Swarm from 2017 to 2019. Jeremy, Lyle, and Miles played together on the Georgia Swarm from 2023 to 2025. |
| Wray | Devan and Taylor | Canada | |

== Fathers - sons ==
- Castle: J.R. Castle and George Castle
- Sanderson: Terry and Josh
- Sanderson: Lindsay and Phil, Brandon, Nate
- Williams: Shawn and Dyson

== Cousins ==
- Evans: Shawn and Turner
- Goodwin: Justin and Brandon (brothers) and Connor
- Messenger: Mike and Evan
- Sanderson: Ryan and Chris (brothers), Brandon, Nate and Phil (brothers), Josh

== Uncles - nephews ==
- Sanderson: Lindsay and Chris, Josh, Ryan
- Sanderson: Terry and Brandon, Chris, Phil, Ryan, Nate
- Veltman: Jim and Peter, Daryl
- McCready: Pat and Joel

== Brothers-in-law ==
- Mike Hasen and Pat O'Toole
- Bill and Zack Greer and Dan and Paul Dawson (Bill Greer married Dawson's older sister)
- Billy Dee Smith and Mark Steenhuis
