= Peyser =

Peyser is a surname. It may refer to:

- Gregory Peyser, American lacrosse player
- Michael Peyser, American lacrosse player
- Penny Peyser, American actress
- Peter A. Peyser, American politician from New York
- Stephen Peyser, American lacrosse player
- Theodore A. Peyser, American politician from New York

Other uses

- Peyser Building—Security Savings and Commercial Bank, National Register of Historic Places in Washington, D.C.
