= Pat Maddalena =

Canadian professional lacrosse player (born 1978)

Personal information
- Born: June 26, 1978 (age 47) Welland, Ontario, Canada
- Height: 5 ft 9 in (175 cm)
- Weight: 169 lb (77 kg; 12 st 1 lb)

Sport
- Position: Forward
- Shoots: Left
- NLL draft: 15th overall, 1999; Buffalo Bandits
- NLL teams: Toronto Rock; Buffalo Bandits; Columbus Landsharks; Arizona Sting; New York Titans; Orlando Titans
- Pro career: 2000–2011

Pat Maddalena (born June 26, 1978 in Welland, Ontario) is a Canadian professional lacrosse player who last played for the Toronto Rock in the National Lacrosse League. In 2009, Maddalena was ranked number 25 on NLLInsider.com's top 50 players in the NLL. During the 2009 NLL season, he was named a reserve to the All-Star game. As of the 2012 NLL season, Maddalena is no longer playing for the league.

When not playing lacrosse, Maddalena is a chiropractor, with a practice in Fonthill, Ontario, Canada.

== Junior career ==
Maddalena played four years of Junior "A" lacrosse with the Burlington Chiefs. In 1996, he was awarded the "P.C.O Trophy" for Rookie of the Year. Maddalena was also awarded the "Gaylord Powless Award" for Ability/Sportsmanship in 1998 and the All-Star Game M.V.P. in 1999.

== Statistics ==
=== NLL ===
Pat Maddalena		Regular season									Playoffs								
Season	Team	GP	G	A	Pts	LB	PIM	Pts/GP	LB/GP	PIM/GP	GP	G	A	Pts	LB	PIM	Pts/GP	LB/GP	PIM/GP
2000	Buffalo Bandits	11	12	11	23	52	8	2.09	4.73	0.73	–	–	–	–	–	–	–	–	–
2001	Buffalo Bandits	14	24	13	37	94	4	2.64	6.71	0.29	–	–	–	–	–	–	–	–	–
2002	Buffalo Bandits	15	22	14	36	52	2	2.40	3.47	0.13	–	–	–	–	–	–	–	–	–
2003	Columbus Landsharks	16	40	31	71	91	6	4.44	5.69	0.38	–	–	–	–	–	–	–	–	–
2004	Arizona Sting	16	42	41	83	44	6	5.19	2.75	0.38	–	–	–	–	–	–	–	–	–
2005	Arizona Sting	16	31	28	59	71	6	3.69	4.44	0.38	3	6	9	15	14	2	5.00	4.67	0.67
2006	Arizona Sting	15	24	34	58	58	6	3.87	3.87	0.40	2	0	5	5	9	2	2.50	4.50	1.00
2007	New York Titans	16	40	43	83	99	6	5.19	6.19	0.38	–	–	–	–	–	–	–	–	–
2008	New York Titans	15	33	52	85	66	6	5.67	4.40	0.40	2	5	5	10	8	2	5.00	4.00	1.00
2009	New York Titans	16	28	47	75	78	2	4.69	4.88	0.13	3	3	8	11	9	0	3.67	3.00	0.00
2010	Orlando Titans	15	18	47	65	47	4	4.33	3.13	0.27	2	4	7	11	6	0	5.50	3.00	0.00
2011	Toronto Rock	7	4	6	10	26	0	1.43	3.71	0.00	–	–	–	–	–	–	–	–	–
		172	318	367	685	778	56	3.98	4.52	0.33	12	18	34	52	46	6	4.33	3.83	0.50
Career Total:		184	336	401	737	824	62	4.01	4.48	0.34									

GP–Games played; G–Goals; A–Assists; Pts–Points; LB–Loose balls; PIM–Penalty minutes; Pts/GP–Points per games played; LB/GP–Loose balls per games played; PIM/GP–Penalty minutes per games played.

=== Canadian Lacrosse Association ===
			Regular Season					Playoffs
Season	Team	League	GP	G	A	Pts	PIM	GP	G	A	Pts	PIM
1994	Niagara Spartan Warriors	OLA Jr.B	1	0	0	0	0	0	0	0	0	0
1995	Spartan Warriors	OLA Jr.B	20	22	26	48	10	14	8	16	24	6
1996	Burlington Chiefs	OLA Jr.A	19	17	26	43	13	3	2	1	3	2
1997	Burlington Chiefs	OLA Jr.A	17	35	27	62	13	4	4	9	13	0
1998	Burlington Chiefs	OLA Jr.A	20	45	41	86	6	5	10	9	19	0
1999	Burlington Chiefs	OLA Jr.A	20	41	43	84	32	4	4	2	6	4
2000	New Westminster Salmonbellies	WLA	23	34	30	64	19	4	4	5	9	0
2001	New Westminster Salmonbellies	WLA	19	23	28	51	2	4	3	0	3	0
2002	St. Catharines Athletics	MSL	6	11	8	19	2	4	1	4	5	2
2004	Brooklin Redmen	MSL	3	6	3	9	0	2	1	2	3	0
2007	St. Regis Indians	MSL	3	4	4	8	0	10	10	14	24	10
2008	St. Regis Indians	MSL	14	16	25	41	2	8	6	6	12	0
2009	St. Regis Indians	MSL	15	19	44	63	24	8	8	14	22	0
Junior A Totals			76	138	137	275	64	20	16	42	58	6
Junior B Totals			21	22	26	48	10	16	20	21	41	6
Senior A Totals			83	113	142	255	49	40	33	45	78	12
