= Chris Sanderson =

Canadian lacrosse player (c. 1974 – 2012)

Personal information
- Nationality: Canadian
- Born: c. 1974 Orangeville, Ontario, Canada
- Died: June 28, 2012 (aged 37–38) Princeton, New Jersey, U.S.

Sport
- Position: Goaltender
- NLL draft: 4th overall, 1998; Baltimore Thunder
- NLL teams: New Jersey Storm; Philadelphia Wings; Baltimore Thunder
- MLL team: Toronto Nationals
- Pro career: 1999–2003

Chris Sanderson (c. 1974 – June 28, 2012) was a Canadian lacrosse coach and member of the Canadian team defending their world championship. Sanderson was an assistant coach for the Philadelphia Wings in the National Lacrosse League from 2005 to 2007 season. Sanderson played for parts of five seasons as a goaltender.

Chris was a member of the Sanderson family of Orangeville, Ontario. He was the cousin of current NLL players Josh and Phil, as well as former NLL player Nate, and was the nephew of both former Wings GM Lindsay Sanderson and Toronto GM Terry Sanderson. Lastly, but definitely not least, he was the son of multiple Mann Cup championships winner and hall of fame inductee, Bill Gerrie. He played for multiple MSL teams such as Six Nations, and Brampton Excelsiors, as well as the NLL team Buffalo Bandits.

Sanderson led the University of Virginia Cavaliers to two NCAA Final Fours. He has played in four world championships with the Canadian National Team, and has coached the U-19 Canadian team to a world championship. He also taught at the Pennington School in Pennington, NJ, and owned a lacrosse company and club team known as True North Lacrosse Company.

He was originally diagnosed with a grade IV malignant brain tumor called Glioblastoma Multiforme in December, 2008. The 2006 ILF gold medalist fought back, skipping a month of chemo therapy to miraculously represent Canada at the 2010 FIL World Championships in England, helping the Canadians to a silver medal. Sanderson was named to the All-World Team at the goaltender position in the 2010 FIL WC, becoming the first (and only) person in the history of the sport to have been named All-World goalie three times ('98, '06, '10). Sanderson died of brain cancer on June 28, 2012, at the age of 38.

== Statistics ==
=== NLL ===
		Regular Season						Playoffs
Season	Team	GP	Min	GA	Sv	GAA	Sv %	GP	Min	GA	Sv	GAA	Sv %
1999	Baltimore	12	663	156	388	14.12	71.32%	1	21	8	11	22.86	57.89%
2001	Philadelphia	6	94	28	55	17.80	66.27%	--	--	--	--	--	--
2002	Philadelphia	16	346	92	223	15.93	70.79%	1	0	0	0	0.00	0.00%
2003	New Jersey	5	44	9	24	12.26	72.73%	--	--	--	--	--	--
NLL totals		39	1,148	285	690	14.90	70.77%	2	21	8	11	22.86	57.89%
