= Mark Steenhuis =

Canadian professional lacrosse player

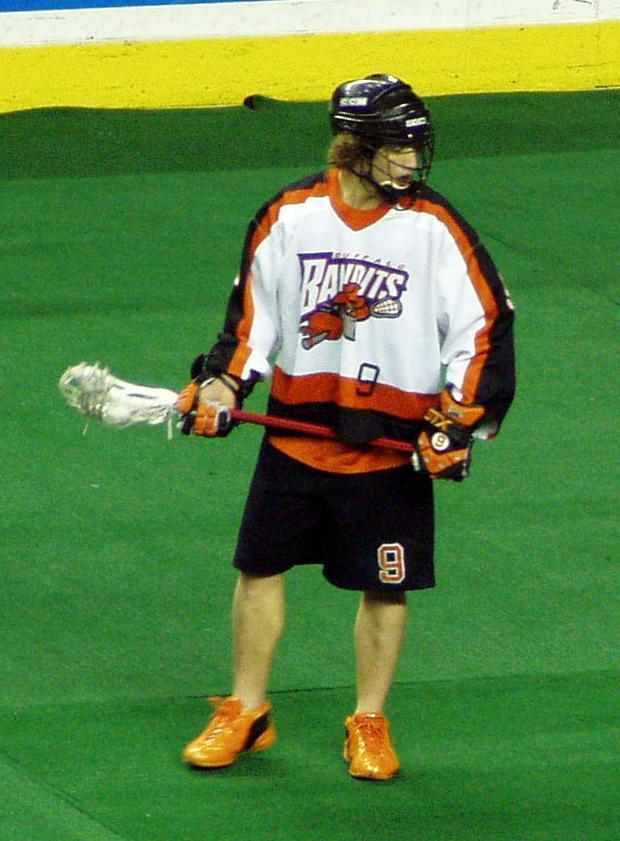
- Steenhuis with the Buffalo Bandits in 2006

Personal information
- Nationality: Canadian
- Born: December 3, 1980 (age 45) St. Catharines, Ontario
- Height: 5 ft 9 in (175 cm)
- Weight: 185 lb (84 kg; 13 st 3 lb)

Sport
- Position: Forward
- Shoots: Right
- NLL draft: 7th overall, 2002; Columbus Landsharks
- NLL teams: Buffalo Bandits; Columbus Landsharks
- MLL teams: Hamilton Nationals
- MSL team: Peterborough Lakers
- Pro career: 2002–2018

Mark Steenhuis (born December 3, 1980) is a Canadian retired professional lacrosse player who is best known for his time with the Buffalo Bandits in the National Lacrosse League (NLL) from 2003-2018.

== Introduction to lacrosse ==
Born in St. Catharines, Ontario, Steenhuis graduated from Governor Simcoe Secondary School in 1998. He did not start playing lacrosse until he was 17-years-old, when he was introduced to the game by friend and future Buffalo Bandits teammate, Billy Dee Smith.

== NLL career ==
Steenhuis made his NLL debut in 2002 with the Columbus Landsharks. After the 2002 season, he was traded to the Buffalo Bandits for goalie Ken Montour. Once in Buffalo, Steenhuis quickly became a fan favorite, due in part to his energetic style of play, goal-scoring ability, and athleticism, but also for his afro hair and bright orange shoes.

Steenhuis was named MVP of the 2004, 2007 and 2009 National Lacrosse League All-Star Games, becoming the first player in NLL history to be named MVP of multiple All-Star Games. He scored six times in 2004 and 2007 and seven times in 2009. In 2008, Steenhuis was named the NLL Transition Player of the Year. and the NLL Championship Game MVP.

On February 14, 2009, he set the league single-game records for assists (13) and points (17).

== Canadian Box career ==
=== Junior ===
After having a successful rookie season with the Spartan Warriors in 1999, Steenhuis played two successful years of Jr.A lacrosse with the St. Catharines Athletics, and helped lead the team to a Minto Cup national championship in 2001.

=== Senior ===
Steenhuis began his senior career with the St. Catharines Athletics of Major Series Lacrosse. During his first season, he recorded 20 goals and 50 points, and shared the "Gene Dopp Memorial Trophy" for Rookie of the Year with Mike Miron. The next year, Steenhuis had 54 points in 14 games, and was awarded the "Jim Murphy Trophy" for league Most Valuable Player. In 2004, Steenhuis would have a career high of 91 points in just 17 games, averaging 5.3 points per game. Steenhuis played for the St. Regis Indians in 2008 and 2009 before the team folded. In 2010, Steenhuis was selected 1st overall by the Peterborough Lakers in the St. Regis dispersal draft.

== Statistics ==
=== NLL ===
Mark Steenhuis		Regular season									Playoffs								
Season	Team	GP	G	A	Pts	LB	PIM	Pts/GP	LB/GP	PIM/GP	GP	G	A	Pts	LB	PIM	Pts/GP	LB/GP	PIM/GP
2002	Columbus Landsharks	12	11	19	30	85	11	2.50	7.08	0.92	–	–	–	–	–	–	–	–	–
2003	Buffalo Bandits	15	16	17	33	128	35	2.20	8.53	2.33	2	1	1	2	24	2	1.00	12.00	1.00
2004	Buffalo Bandits	16	27	17	44	129	20	2.75	8.06	1.25	3	7	4	11	36	2	3.67	12.00	0.67
2005	Buffalo Bandits	16	34	28	62	141	23	3.88	8.81	1.44	1	5	1	6	7	0	6.00	7.00	0.00
2006	Buffalo Bandits	15	34	23	57	144	22	3.80	9.60	1.47	3	5	3	8	17	0	2.67	5.67	0.00
2007	Buffalo Bandits	15	25	24	49	108	4	3.27	7.20	0.27	2	2	1	3	13	2	1.50	6.50	1.00
2008	Buffalo Bandits	15	34	41	75	121	27	5.00	8.07	1.80	3	12	5	17	23	6	5.67	7.67	2.00
2009	Buffalo Bandits	16	51	50	101	117	24	6.31	7.31	1.50	2	4	2	6	6	2	3.00	3.00	1.00
2010	Buffalo Bandits	16	36	54	90	99	27	5.63	6.19	1.69	1	2	4	6	4	0	6.00	4.00	0.00
2011	Buffalo Bandits	16	22	39	61	82	18	3.81	5.13	1.13	2	2	5	7	7	2	3.50	3.50	1.00
2012	Buffalo Bandits	16	27	35	62	75	38	3.88	4.69	2.38	1	1	0	1	10	0	1.00	10.00	0.00
2013	Buffalo Bandits	16	13	26	39	71	29	2.44	4.44	1.81	–	–	–	–	–	–	–	–	–
2014	Buffalo Bandits	18	31	32	63	108	21	3.50	6.00	1.17	3	6	9	15	21	2	5.00	7.00	0.67
2015	Buffalo Bandits	17	36	59	95	68	25	5.59	4.00	1.47	1	1	4	5	5	2	5.00	5.00	2.00
2016	Buffalo Bandits	18	34	38	72	68	36	4.00	3.78	2.00	4	6	5	11	18	6	2.75	4.50	1.50
2017	Buffalo Bandits	18	24	43	67	67	32	3.72	3.72	1.78	–	–	–	–	–	–	–	–	–
2018	Buffalo Bandits	11	4	9	13	30	10	1.18	2.73	0.91	–	–	–	–	–	–	–	–	–
		266	459	554	1,013	1,641	402	3.81	6.17	1.51	28	54	44	98	191	26	3.50	6.82	0.93
Career Total:		294	513	598	1,111	1,832	428	3.78	6.23	1.46									

GP–Games played; G–Goals; A–Assists; Pts–Points; LB–Loose balls; PIM–Penalty minutes; Pts/GP–Points per games played; LB/GP–Loose balls per games played; PIM/GP–Penalty minutes per games played.

=== OLA ===
			Regular Season					Playoffs
Season	Team	League	GP	G	A	Pts	PIM	GP	G	A	Pts	PIM
1999	Spartan Warriors	OLA Jr.B	21	11	15	26	20	11	9	3	12	25
1999	St. Catharines Athletics	OLA Jr.A	4	0	0	0	0	6	0	2	2	12
2000	St. Catharines Athletics	OLA Jr.A	17	22	19	41	14	15	9	12	21	18
2001	St. Catharines Athletics	OLA Jr.A	18	18	21	39	35	13	9	20	29	18
Minto Cup	St. Catharines Athletics	CLA	--	--	--	--	--	6	5	9	14	4
2002	St. Catharines Athletics	MSL	19	20	30	50	24	4	7	2	9	15
2003	St. Catharines Athletics	MSL	14	36	18	54	34	10	29	19	48	12
2004	St. Catharines Athletics	MSL	17	42	49	91	70	3	5	4	9	6
2005	Barrie Lakeshores	MSL	16	32	38	70	57	9	17	19	36	27
2006	Barrie Lakeshores	MSL	16	18	22	40	8	10	15	19	34	37
2007	Barrie Lakeshores	MSL	16	30	50	80	12	4	3	6	9	10
2008	St. Regis Indians	MSL	15	34	48	82	16	9	20	20	40	20
2009	St. Regis Indians	MSL	10	20	22	42	18	8	22	22	44	12
Junior A Totals			39	40	40	80	49	34	18	34	52	48
Junior B Totals			21	11	15	26	20	11	9	3	12	25
Minto Cup Totals			--	--	--	--	--	6	5	9	14	4
Senior A Totals			123	185	288	473	280	57	118	111	229	139

== Personal life ==
Steenhuis' son, Ari, also plays lacrosse. Ari renounced his NCAA eligibility, and was drafted by the NLL's San Diego Seals with the 18th selection of the 2025 NLL Entry Draft.

== Awards ==
Preceded by Steve Toll	NLL Transition Player of the Year; 2008	Succeeded by Brodie Merrill
Preceded by John Grant, Jr.	Champion's Cup MVP; 2008	Succeeded by Josh Sanderson
