= The Warrior's Way =

2010 film

- Theatrical release poster
- Directed by: Sngmoo Lee
- Written by: Sngmoo Lee
- Produced by: Barrie M. Osborne; Lee Joo-Ick; Michael Peyser
- Starring: Geoffrey Rush; Kate Bosworth; Danny Huston; Jang Dong-gun; Tony Cox; Ti Lung
- Cinematography: Woo-Hyung Kim
- Edited by: Jonathan Woodford-Robinson
- Music by: Javier Navarrete
- Production companies: Fuse Media; Sad Flutes; Relativity Media
- Distributed by: Rogue
- Release date: 3 December 2010
- Running time: 100 minutes
- Countries: New Zealand; South Korea
- Language: English
- Budget: $42 million
- Box office: $11 million

The Warrior's Way is a 2010 New Zealand-South Korean fantasy action film written and directed by Sngmoo Lee and starring Jang Dong-gun, Kate Bosworth, Geoffrey Rush, Danny Huston and Tony Cox. The film was released on 3 December 2010. Its plot concerns a 19th-century warrior named Yang (Jang Dong-gun), who is ordered to kill the last member of an enemy clan — a baby girl. He refuses the mission and flees with the child to a dilapidated town in the American West.

== Plot ==
In 19th century Asia, Yang is a warrior and member of Sad Flute's clan, the cruelest assassins in the east. His personal goal to become the greatest swordsman in the entire world is accomplished when he kills the former champion and leader of the enemy clan. Both clans having sworn to fight until every member of the opposing clan is dead, Yang has killed every member except a baby girl, deciding to spare her. This act makes Yang a sworn enemy of his own clan, and forces him to flee his homeland.

After making his way to the American West, Yang arrives in the small town of Lode. There he seeks out a fellow rogue warrior friend known to the townsfolk as Smiley, but he discovers that Smiley died 3 years previously. Among the townspeople Yang meets are a gang of carnival members led by the dwarf Eight-Ball, town drunk Ron and Lynne, a spunky young woman who was friends with Smiley.

Lynne gives Yang the nickname Skinny and agrees to teach him how to do the laundry. Naming the baby girl ‘April’, Yang begins to enjoy life in the town, learning to enjoy pleasures he never knew as a warrior, even finding an interest in opera after Lynne shows him a gramophone. Lynne reveals to Yang that Smiley taught her about using a sword and the Sad Flute clan, and she wants Yang to teach her more, but he is reluctant to do so. Back in the East, Yang's former master Saddest Flute and his warrior army board the same boat to America, killing the entire crew in the process.

Yang sees Lynne place flowers on a grave, and asks Eight-Ball what happened. He explains that when Lynne was a young girl, the town came under siege by a corrupt Colonel. His preference to rape women with healthy teeth prompted him to choose Lynne as his victim, but she was able to escape by throwing a pan of boiling grease in his face. She flees, but the Colonel shoots her in the back and kills her father, mother, and baby brother.

When the townsfolk buried her family, they found Lynne still breathing. Ever since, Lynne has sworn revenge against the Colonel. Lynne gives Yang a pendant as a gift after he teaches her how to throw knives.

Yang shows her his jedok geom (a Korean single-edged sword), but Lynne notes it is welded to its scabbard. Yang explains it is so he cannot fight any longer. In a flashback, Yang is shown being given a puppy by his master.

The Colonel returns to the town to terrorize the people, sporting a frightening mask to hide the grotesque scar from the hot grease. The Colonel tortures a clown by having his men shoot at a bucket of water on the Clown's head, and is about to shoot a glass of whiskey himself when Ron drinks it and is dragged through the town with a whip around his neck being pulled by a horse. The Colonel then inspects a lineup of women for their teeth, and chooses a Hispanic woman whose husband begs for mercy. The Colonel releases the woman to her husband, to only shoot them down simultaneously with a single bullet.

Eight-Ball and the other carnival members tie Lynne up in a cellar for her own safety and Yang removes her blades, but she manages to free herself with a knife hidden in her boot. The Colonel has the Hispanic woman's daughters cleaned to be raped, but Lynne, disguised as a prostitute, offers herself instead. She initially fools the Colonel before he reveals he remembers who she is. His men then rush in to hold Lynne down on the bed. Back in the laundry, the carnival members run in looking for Lynne, and Yang realises where she is. He grabs an iron and shatters the seal on his sword to free it. Far away, Saddest Flute jerks up from meditation, sensing the seal break.

Just as Lynne is about to be raped, Yang bursts in through the window and expertly slays everyone in the room except the Colonel. As Yang turns to kill him, Lynne intercedes, saying that she will do it, but the Colonel grabs her and leaps out the window, using her to break his fall before attempting to flee on horse, but Lynne is able to deliver an expert knife throw to his back. The townsfolk pull off the mask to reveal a decoy instead, and are terrified that the Colonel will return to kill them. Yang is about to leave town before the Sad Flutes come for him, but the townsfolk implore him to stay and help.

The people are worried they don't have the means to defend themselves, but Eight-Ball has Ron's secret stash of guns and explosives unburied. Ron is shown to be an expert marksman, shooting a bowling pin down amidst his best liquor from hundreds of feet away. Yang asks Ron why he stopped shooting and Ron explains that he was once an outlaw, using his great skill to rob banks and trains. His criminal career ended when the woman he loved was shot during a gunfight, and he vowed to never pick up a gun again. Ron advises Yang that the best thing he can do is stay far away from those he cares about. The day before battle, Lynne asks to leave with Yang. Later that night, Yang comes to Lynne's house and gives her his twin short swords.

The Colonel arrives with scores of outlaws to assault the town. As the men approach, they are met with explosions. Perched at the top of the Ferris wheel, Ron is sniping sticks of dynamite hidden in the garden as riders come. In the ensuing dust and chaos, Yang rapidly and stealthily disposes of many of the men. The outlaws are lured to the Ferris wheel, where Yang and the carnival members ambush them as Ron slides to safety on a cable, and the Ferris wheel is blown up, killing many of the Colonel's men. The survivors chase the carnival members to the centre of town, where the Sad Flutes suddenly assemble. Yang looks to Lynne holding April and tells her to run.

Yang follows Lynne to the laundry shop, killing many warriors on the way as the outlaws and warriors engage in battle. In the laundry, Lynne hands April to Eight-Ball so she can help Yang. After they kill some warriors, they hear shots and run to the dying Eight-Ball, who says he couldn't protect April. The Colonel is then shown entering a building carrying April.

The Sad Flutes pursue, but are fended off with a machine gun. However, the outlaws are unable to stop Yang, who brutally slices through them as he chases after the Colonel. He enters a room to find the Colonel holding a gun to April's head, but leaps up to cut the gun barrel and bullet in half mid-firing. Catching April, Yang steps aside to let Lynne fight the Colonel. After a tense battle, Lynne manages to finally drive a sword into the Colonel's back.

Yang and Lynne exit the room to find Saddest Flute waiting, who tells Yang that April is the enemy, and asks if he would ever tell April that he killed her parents. Yang and Saddest Flute go to the desert at sunset and duel to the death. During the duel, flashbacks show Saddest Flute training Yang and forcing him to kill the puppy he was given, declaring Yang's biggest enemy would be his heart. In the present, Yang wins the duel, cutting Saddest Flute's throat.

Lynne tells Yang she knows she won't be coming with him, and tries to hand him April, but he refuses. He makes the baby laugh once more, and gives Lynne a caring look before turning to the sunset and leaving. Ron narrates that Yang never stopped walking, putting as much space between him and the people he loved as possible. The scene then shifts to a hooded man in a parka. Another man approaches and the hooded man nimbly kills him, knives falling out of the latter's hands as he collapses. The hooded man, revealed to be Yang, stands up and goes to his shack, where he takes the pendant he had been given by Lynne, his sword disguised as a snowman's broom and April's pacifier before setting the hut on fire. Walking out to the snow, a slew of clan warriors leap out of the snow, and Yang unsheathes his sword as the scene fades.

== Cast ==
- Jang Dong-gun as Yang
- Jo Young-min as young Yang
- Geoffrey Rush as Ron
- Kate Bosworth as Lynne
- Danny Huston as The Colonel
- Tony Cox as Eight-Ball
- Ti Lung as Saddest Flute
- Ash Jones as Rug
- Analin Rudd as Baby April
- Nic Sampson as Pug
- Ryan Richards as Slug
- Matt Gillanders as Geyser
- Eoin McDonald as Hell Rider
- John Rawls as Hell Rider
- Chontelle Melgren as Young Lynne
- Wayne Gordon as Killer Klown

== Production ==
The film was written and directed by Sngmoo Lee, and produced by Barrie M. Osborne (who also produced The Lord of the Rings), along with Lee Joo-Ick and Michael Peyser. Cinematography was by Woo-Hyung Kim, and Jonathan Woodford-Robinson edited the film. Javier Navarrete composed the score.

Filming began in Auckland on 12 November 2007 and wrapped on 28 February 2008.

== Reception ==
The film received negative reviews. It has a 31% approval rating on the review aggregator website Rotten Tomatoes, based on 42 reviews, with an average rating of 4.5 out of 10. The website's consensus reads, "Perfectly, thoroughly divisive, The Warrior's Way will either be delightful or unbearable, depending on your tolerance for surreal, shamelessly over the top collisions of eastern and western clichés." Audiences polled by CinemaScore gave the film an average grade of "C−" on an A+ to F scale.

=== Box office ===
In the film's opening weekend, it grossed a poor $3,048,665 in the US. The film ranked #9 at the weekend charts. The number of theatres dramatically reduced from 1,622 to 34 within three weeks from the opening day. The film grossed $11,087,569 worldwide and had a production budget of $42 million, making the movie a box office bomb. The movie was one of the biggest box office bombs of 2010 next to MacGruber, How Do You Know and Jonah Hex.
