= George Castle (lacrosse) =

American lacrosse player

Personal information
- Nationality: American
- Born: October 8, 1984 (age 41) Glenside, Pennsylvania, U.S.
- Height: 6 ft 1 in (185 cm)
- Weight: 190 lb (86 kg; 13 st 8 lb)

Sport
- Position: Midfield/Defense
- NLL team: Philadelphia Wings
- NCAA team: Johns Hopkins University
- Pro career: 2009–

George Castle (born October 8, 1984) from Glenside, Pennsylvania, is an American lacrosse player previously with the Philadelphia Wings of National Lacrosse League. He is a defensive midfielder. A William Penn Charter School graduate, Castle played collegiate lacrosse with the Johns Hopkins Blue Jays where he helped his team win two national championships.

In December 2008, he joined the Philadelphia Wings as a free agent for the 2009 season, primarily as a defensive player. Castle's father, J.R. Castle, played on the Wings' inaugural team during its 1987 season.

In 2012, Castle was selected in the 4th round of the 2012 North American Lacrosse League draft (23rd overall) and played for the Stickhorses in their 2013 NALL campaign.

The Radotin Custodes (Czech Republic) also selected Castle 17th overall in the European Lacrosse League draft where he also competed in the 2013 ELL season.

== See also ==
- List of family relations in the National Lacrosse League
- Lacrosse in Pennsylvania
