= Jason Bloom =

Jason Bloom may refer to:

- Jason Bloom (lacrosse) (born 1982), American lacrosse player
- Jason Bloom (director) (born 1968/9), American film and television director
