= Jarett Park =

American lacrosse player

Personal information
- Nickname: J-Rat
- Nationality: American
- Born: October 25, 1982 (age 43) Winfield, Illinois, U.S.
- Height: 6 ft 1 in (185 cm)
- Weight: 205 lb (93 kg; 14 st 9 lb)

Sport
- Position: Midfield
- Shoots: Right
- NLL team Former teams: Colorado Mammoth; Orlando Titans; New York Titans; San Jose Stealth
- MLL team Former teams: Washington Bayhawks; San Francisco Dragons; Boston Cannons
- NCAA team: Syracuse University
- Pro career: 2005–

Jarett Park (born October 25, 1982) is a professional lacrosse player from Otisco, New York. He currently plays for the Colorado Mammoth in the National Lacrosse League, and the Washington Bayhawks of Major League Lacrosse.

== College career ==
Park is a graduate of Syracuse University, where he was a two-sport athlete. A midfielder on the lacrosse team, leading the team in groundballs in all four seasons, he helped them win two NCAA Men's Lacrosse Championships in 2002 and 2004. Park also played on the Orangemen soccer team. As a freshman, he was awarded the Big East Rookie of the Year and led the nation in assists per game. In 2001 he was named College Men's Freshman of the Year by Soccer America magazine. As a junior, he garnered All-Big East recognition. As a senior, Park did not play soccer, instead deciding to focus on lacrosse.

== Professional career ==
Park's professional career started in 2005 with the Boston Cannons of the Major League Lacrosse, where he was twice named Rookie of the Week. Following his rookie season, he was traded to the expansion San Francisco Dragons. In both 2006 and 2007, he finished with the team's second highest groundball totals. During the 2008 MLL season, Park was traded to the Washington Bayhawks.

In the 2006 NLL season, Park played with the San Jose Stealth of the National Lacrosse League. Following the season, he was acquired by the New York Titans in the 2006 NLL expansion draft. In 2007, he led the team in groundballs with 129, good for eighth in the league. In 2008, he was awarded Week 7 "Transition Player of the Week" honors, and was also named to the National Lacrosse League All-Star Game. During the 2009 NLL season, he was again named to the All-Star Game as an injury replacement.

When the Titans moved to Orlando, Park went with them, playing one more season with the team before they disbanded. He was chosen by the Colorado Mammoth in the dispersal draft.

== Statistics ==
=== NLL ===
		Regular Season						Playoffs
Season	Team	GP	G	A	Pts	LB	PIM	GP	G	A	Pts	LB	PIM
2006	San Jose	10	6	6	12	41	2	--	--	--	--	--	--
2007	New York	16	6	13	19	129	43	--	--	--	--	--	--
2008	New York	15	5	5	10	147	24	2	1	2	3	26	4
2009	New York	16	4	5	9	134	21	3	0	1	1	29	2
2010	Orlando	9	1	4	5	63	26	2	1	0	1	11	6
2011	Colorado	12	0	2	2	82	15	1	0	0	0	4	0
NLL totals		78	22	35	57	596	131	8	2	3	5	70	12
