= Athan Iannucci =

Canadian lacrosse player

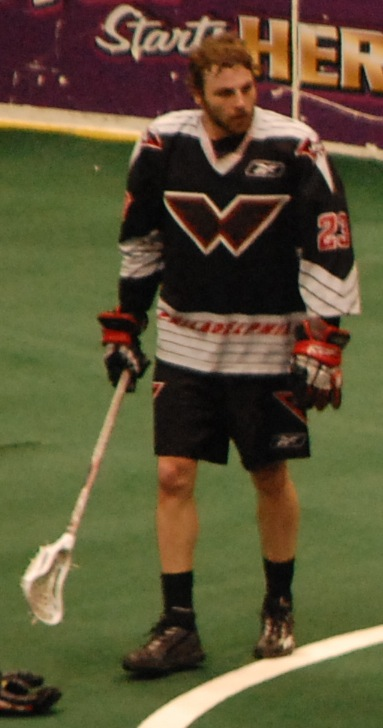
- Iannucci with the Philadelphia Wings in 2008

Personal information
- Nickname: Nooch
- Born: April 15, 1982 (age 44) New Westminster, British Columbia, Canada
- Height: 6 ft 4 in (193 cm)
- Weight: 215 lb (98 kg; 15 st 5 lb)

Sport
- Position: Forward
- Shoots: Right
- NLL draft: 8th overall, 2006; Philadelphia Wings
- NLL team Former teams: Colorado Mammoth; Washington Stealth; Philadelphia Wings
- MLL team Former teams: Toronto Nationals; Chicago Machine
- WLA team: Langley Thunder
- Pro career: 2007–

Athan Iannucci (born April 15, 1982) is a Canadian professional lacrosse player. He played collegiate lacrosse at Hofstra University. Iannucci played professional lacrosse for the Colorado Mammoth of the National Lacrosse League. He was a member of the now defunct St. Regis Indians of the Ontario Lacrosse Association's Senior-A Major Series Lacrosse. He plays in the summer months for the WLA Langley Thunder.

== Professional career ==
=== NLL career ===
Iannucci was a first-round draft pick (8th overall) by the Philadelphia Wings of the National Lacrosse League in the 2007 NLL entry draft. He was awarded Rookie of the Week Honors in Week 5 and Week 15 of the 2007 season, and was also named to the 2007 All-Rookie team. As a rookie, he led the Wings in goals scored.

Iannucci's second season in the league was record-setting. On April 12, 2008, Iannucci scored three goals and broke Gary Gait's National Lacrosse League record of 61 goals in a season.

During 2008, Iannucci was awarded Player of the Month honours in both January and February, the first time since 1996 that a player has been Player of the Month in back-to-back months. He was also named player of the month for April, giving him three of the four player of the month awards in the 2008 season. He led the league in goals, points, and shots on goal, was named Offensive and Overall Player of the Week in week 16, was named to both the starting All-Star team and the First All-Pro team. His stellar season was capped off when he was named 2008 NLL Most Valuable Player, the first Wings player to do so since Gary Gait in 1997.

In June 2008, Iannucci suffered two meniscal tears in his knee, and underwent successful knee surgery in July. He did not play again until Philadelphia's third game of the 2009 season, but left that game after only playing a few minutes. Iannucci sat out the 2010 NLL season to undergo further surgery, a right leg ligament reconstruction.

After scoring 100 (71g 29a) points with the Wings in 2011, Philadelphia traded Iannucci to the Edmonton Rush with teammates Alex Turner and Brodie McDonald, along with Philadelphia's first round draft picks in 2012, 2013 and 2014. In exchange, the Wings acquired Edmonton transition player Brodie Merrill, Rush forwards Dean Hill, Mike McLellan, and Edmonton's 41st selection in the 2011 entry draft, and the 4th round selection in 2013.

Iannucci never signed a contract with the Rush, and on February 13, 2012, he was traded to the Washington Stealth for Paul Rabil.

After two seasons in Washington, Iannucci was released by the Stealth prior to the 2014 season but only two weeks into the season, he was signed by the Colorado Mammoth.

=== MLL ===
The Chicago Machine selected Iannucci first Overall in the 2007 Major League Lacrosse Supplemental Draft, though he played sparingly with the team in 2007.

He signed with the Toronto Nationals expansion team in 2009, but played just two games with the team before being released.

== WLA/OLA career ==
In 2007, Iannucci won the Denny Huddleston Memorial Trophy in the Western Lacrosse Association as the league's top scorer with the New Westminster Salmonbellies. In 1999, he won the Joe Nieuwendyk Award as the top rookie in the OLA Junior A Lacrosse League. In 2008, he played for St. Regis Indians of the Ontario Lacrosse Association's Senior-A Major Series Lacrosse until he injured his knee. The knee was successfully repaired by surgery and Iannucci is expected to rehabilitate for approximately 6 months, in time for the next NLL season. While playing for the Langley Thunder on August 27, 2011, the team won the Western Lacrosse Association Championship for the first time in franchise history. Iannucci is expected to play in the national Mann Cup that will be held in September 2011 at the Langley Events Centre.

== College career ==
Iannucci attended Hofstra University. In 2006, he tied with teammate Chris Unterstein for leading scorer the nation with 80 points (62G, 18A) in 19 games. While at Hofstra, Iannucci had back surgery to repair a disc herniation.

Iannucci played only three years at Hofstra, after his NCAA eligibility waiver for a fourth year was denied due to his prior playing career in the Canadian summer box lacrosse leagues.

== Personal life ==
Iannucci lives in Langley, British Columbia, with his wife Jamie and four children, Ryker, Nixon, Hawksen, and Presley.

== Statistics ==
=== NLL ===
Athan Iannucci		Regular season									Playoffs								
Season	Team	GP	G	A	Pts	LB	PIM	Pts/GP	LB/GP	PIM/GP	GP	G	A	Pts	LB	PIM	Pts/GP	LB/GP	PIM/GP
2007	Philadelphia Wings	15	30	24	54	123	16	3.60	8.20	1.07	–	–	–	–	–	–	–	–	–
2008	Philadelphia Wings	16	71	29	100	138	35	6.25	8.63	2.19	1	4	1	5	6	0	5.00	6.00	0.00
2009	Philadelphia Wings	10	23	14	37	38	10	3.70	3.80	1.00	–	–	–	–	–	–	–	–	–
2011	Philadelphia Wings	13	29	32	61	68	4	4.69	5.23	0.31	–	–	–	–	–	–	–	–	–
2012	Washington Stealth	11	21	24	45	33	2	4.09	3.00	0.18	–	–	–	–	–	–	–	–	–
2013	Washington Stealth	14	22	25	47	40	8	3.36	2.86	0.57	3	6	7	13	4	0	4.33	1.33	0.00
2014	Colorado Mammoth	10	14	19	33	21	6	3.30	2.10	0.60	1	2	2	4	2	0	4.00	2.00	0.00
2015	Colorado Mammoth	4	4	8	12	8	5	3.00	2.00	1.25	–	–	–	–	–	–	–	–	–
		93	214	175	389	469	86	4.18	5.04	0.92	5	12	10	22	12	0	4.40	2.40	0.00
Career Total:		98	226	185	411	481	86	4.19	4.91	0.88									

GP–Games played; G–Goals; A–Assists; Pts–Points; LB–Loose balls; PIM–Penalty minutes; Pts/GP–Points per games played; LB/GP–Loose balls per games played; PIM/GP–Penalty minutes per games played.

=== MLL ===
		Regular Season							Playoffs
Season	Team	GP	G	2ptG	A	Pts	LB	PIM	GP	G	2ptG	A	Pts	LB	PIM
2007	Chicago	4	16	1	3	20	18	0	0	0	0	0	0	0	0
2009	Toronto	2	3	0	1	4	2	1	0	0	0	0	0	0	0
MLL Totals		6	19	1	4	24	20	1	0	0	0	0	0	0	0

=== Junior "A" ===
			Regular Season					Playoffs
Season	Team	League	GP	G	A	Pts	PIM	GP	G	A	Pts	PIM
2000	Coquitlam	BCLA Jr A	5	10	9	19	2	0	0	0	0	0
2001	Coquitlam	BCLA Jr A	20	42	25	67	27	2	0	4	4	4
2002	St. Catharines Athletics	OLA Jr A	20	26	36	62	16	18	20	24	44	16
Minto Cup	St. Catharines Athletics	CLA	--	--	--	--	--	6	3	5	8	10
2003	Coquitlam Adanacs	BCLA Jr A	24	48	47	95	51	6	10	14	24	2
Junior A Totals			69	126	117	243	96	26	30	42	72	22
Minto Cup totals			--	--	--	--	--	6	3	5	8	10

=== Senior "A" ===
			Regular Season					Playoffs
Season	Team	League	GP	G	A	Pts	PIM	GP	G	A	Pts	PIM
2002	St. Catharines Athletics	MSL	2	0	1	1	0	0	0	0	0	0
2003	Coquitlam Adanacs	WLA	1	0	0	0	0	0	0	0	0	0
2004	New Westminster Salmonbellies	WLA	10	8	11	19	2	0	0	0	0	0
2005	New Westminster Salmonbellies	WLA	15	12	34	46	12	6	5	11	16	0
2006	New Westminster Salmonbellies	WLA	17	44	31	75	10	10	17	13	30	14
2007	New Westminster Salmonbellies	WLA	17	51	44	95	45	9	17	23	40	10
2008	St. Regis Indians	MSL	5	10	9	19	2	0	0	0	0	0
2009	St. Regis Indians	MSL	17	29	27	56	0	7	12	6	18	4
2011	Langley Thunder	WLA	18	29	29	58	6	10	22	13	35	20
Senior A Totals			110	193	196	389	79	42	73	66	139	48

=== Hofstra University ===
Season	Team	GP	G	A	Pts	GB
2004	Hofsta University	14	16	11	27	32
2005	Hofsta University	15	27	13	40	39
2006	Hofsta University	19	62	18	80	37
Totals		48	105	42	147	108

== Awards ==
Preceded by John Grant, Jr.	NLL Most Valuable Player; 2008	Succeeded by Dan Dawson
