= J. R. Castle =

American lacrosse player

Personal information
- Nationality: American

Sport
- NLL team: Philadelphia Wings
- NCAA team: Drexel University; North Carolina State
- Pro career: 1987

James "J.R." Castle of Glenside, Pennsylvania, is a former American lacrosse player with the Philadelphia Wings of National Lacrosse League. A William Penn Charter School graduate, Castle played collegiate lacrosse with the Drexel Dragons, after transferring from the now-defunct North Carolina State lacrosse program. While at Drexel, Castle earned all-East Coast Conference honors.

After college, Castle played club lacrosse. At age 28, Castle joined the Philadelphia Wings for their inaugural season in 1987, playing with well-known lacrosse figures such as Mike French, Henry Ciccarone Jr., and John Grant Sr. Castle's son, George Castle, joined the Wings' inaugural team during its 2009 season. They are believed to be the first father-son duo to appear as player's in the league's history.

== See also ==
- List of family relations in the National Lacrosse League
- Lacrosse in Pennsylvania
