= Nick Inch =

Canadian lacrosse player

- Born: December 20, 1984 (age 40); Kitchener, ON, CAN
- Height: 6 ft 1 in (1.85 m)
- Weight: 210 pounds (95 kg)
- Shoots: Left
- Position: Defense
- NLL draft: 55th overall, 2005; Toronto Rock
- NLL teams: Minnesota Swarm; Toronto Rock
- Pro career: 2005–
- Nickname: Vanilla Gorilla

Nick Inch (born December 20, 1984) is a Canadian lacrosse player in the National Lacrosse League. He was drafted to the NLL in 2005 by the Toronto Rock in the 5th round as the 55th overall pick.

On September 13, 2006, the Rock traded Inch to the Georgia Swarm along with a second round pick in the 2007 draft for the 19th pick in the 2006 entry draft and a fourth rounder in the 2007 draft. He was traded from the Minnesota Swarm to the Toronto Rock on September 9, 2011, along with Josh Sanderson in exchange for 9th pick in the Boston Blazers Dispersal Draft, 12th pick in the 2011 NLL Entry Draft and a conditional first round pick in the 2012 NLL Entry Draft.
