= Nate Sanderson =

Canadian lacrosse player (born 1985)

Personal information
- Born: June 3, 1985 (age 40) Orangeville, ON, CAN
- Height: 5 ft 10 in (178 cm)
- Weight: 180 lb (82 kg; 12 st 12 lb)

Sport
- Position: Forward
- NLL draft: 26th overall, 2006; Colorado Mammoth
- NLL teams: Toronto Rock
- Pro career: 2008–

Nathan "Nate" Sanderson (born June 3, 1985 in Orangeville, ON) is a Canadian lacrosse player. Sanderson was drafted by the Colorado Mammoth 26th overall in the 2007 National Lacrosse League Entry Draft. He played for the Toronto Rock of the National Lacrosse League during the 2008 NLL season and signed with the Calgary Roughnecks for the 2009 NLL season. Sanderson is one of a number of Sandersons in the NLL, including his brother Phil and his cousin Josh.

== Statistics ==
=== NLL ===
		Regular Season						Playoffs
Season	Team	GP	G	A	Pts	LB	PIM	GP	G	A	Pts	LB	PIM
2008	Toronto	1	0	0	0	1	0	--	--	--	--	--	--
2011	Calgary	0	0	0	0	0	0	--	--	--	--	--	--
NLL totals		1	0	0	0	1	0	0	0	0	0	0	0
