= Dan Dawson =

Canadian lacrosse player (born 1981)

Personal information
- Nickname: Dangerous Dan
- Born: December 11, 1981 (age 44) Oakville, Ontario, Canada
- Height: 6 ft 6 in (198 cm)
- Weight: 220 lb (100 kg; 15 st 10 lb)

Sport
- Position: Forward
- Shoots: Right
- NLL team Former teams: Toronto Rock; Saskatchewan Rush; Rochester Knighthawks; Philadelphia Wings; Boston Blazers; Portland LumberJax; Arizona Sting; Columbus Landsharks
- MLL team Former teams: Free Agent; Hamilton Nationals
- MSL team: Six Nations Chiefs
- Pro career: 2002–2023

Dan Dawson (born December 11, 1981) is a Canadian former professional box lacrosse player formally playing for the Toronto Rock of the National Lacrosse League, Brampton Excelsiors (MSL) of Major Series Lacrosse, and is currently a free agent in Major League Lacrosse. Dawson ranks 2nd on the all-time NLL points list through of the 2022 season. He is a 7 time NLL All Pro selection. As a professional, he is a 7 time Mann Cup Canadian box lacrosse champion, and a 1 time Major League Lacrosse (field) champion (2009 Toronto Nationals. Representing Canada, Dawson has won two World Indoor (Box) Lacrosse Championship titles and was a finalist in the 2010 World (Field) Lacrosse Championship. Dawson has won two Champion's Cups as a member of the Rochester Knighthawks in 2013 and 2014.

== NLL career ==
Dawson was drafted in the sixth round (68th overall) by the Columbus Landsharks in 2001, and played in 11 games in his rookie season with Columbus, tallying 3 goals, 3 assists and 29 loose balls. In 2003, he played in 16 games, setting career highs in goals and loose balls. In 2004, Dawson helped Team Canada beat Team USA in the Heritage Cup. During the 2004 season, he led Arizona in assists and was 2nd in points. In 2005, Dawson finished 7th in the NLL with 84 points and 2nd in goals with 48. He scored a hat-trick in his first All-Star game with the West Division. In 2005 he was named a First Team All-Pro.

Dawson was selected first overall by the LumberJax in the 2008 dispersal draft, after the Arizona Sting and Boston Blazers announced that they would not be playing in the 2008 season. After leading the LumberJax's the 2008 Champions Cup final, Dawson was again put into National Lacrosse League dispersal draft pool when Arizona ceased operations. This time, Dawson was selected first overall by the Boston Blazers.

During the 2009 NLL season, he was named a starter to the All-Star Game. Dawson and Josh Sanderson both finished the season with 74 assists, a new league record. During the 2012 NLL season, Dawson broke the assists record he shared with Josh Sanderson. However, Garrett Billings eclipsed Dawson's total with 82 and now holds the record.

After only one season in Philadelphia, Dawson was traded along with his brother Paul to the Rochester Knighthawks for four players including Paul Rabil.

Played one season with the expansion team San Diego Seals from 2018-2019.

Dawson announced his retirement on June 12, 2023 after 21 seasons in the NLL. He retired leading all-time in assists and games played, 2nd in points, and 4th in goals scored.

== Canadian Professional Lacrosse ==
As a junior in 2002 he played for Brampton Excelsiors Jr.A, jumped to the Brampton Excelsiors (MSL) that same year and won the Mann Cup. He was signed by the Victoria Shamrocks in 2005 and helped lead them to their 8th Mann Cup victory. He won the Bill Ellison Award twice for the MVP of the 2005 WLA playoffs and the 2006 WLA playoffs.

== Mann Cup ==
2002 - Member of Brampton Excelsiors (MSL), winners in the Mann Cup, MSL champions
2003 - Member of Brampton Excelsiors (MSL), runner up in the Mann Cup, MSL champions
2005 - Member of Victoria Shamrocks, winners in the Mann Cup, WLA champions
2006 - Member of Victoria Shamrocks, runner up in the Mann Cup, WLA champions
2008 - Member of Brampton Excelsiors (MSL), winners of the Mann Cup, MSL champions
2009 - Member of Brampton Excelsiors (MSL), winners of the Mann Cup, MSL champions
2011 - Member of Brampton Excelsiors (MSL), winners of the Mann Cup, MSL champions
Bible of Lacrosse Mann Cup Stats

== International lacrosse career ==
2004 - Member of Team Canada, winners of the Heritage Cup (box lacrosse)
2007 - Member of Team Canada, winners of the World Indoor Lacrosse Championships in Halifax, Nova Scotia
2010 - Member of Team Canada, runner up in the World Lacrosse Championship in Manchester, England
2011 - Member of Team Canada, winners of the World Indoor Lacrosse Championships in Prague, Czech Republic
Bible of Lacrosse 2011 World Box Lacrosse Stats
Indoor.com

== Statistics ==
=== NLL ===
| Dan Dawson | | Regular season | | | | | | | | | Playoffs | | | | | | | | |
| Season | Team | GP | G | A | Pts | LB | PIM | Pts/GP | LB/GP | PIM/GP | GP | G | A | Pts | LB | PIM | Pts/GP | LB/GP | PIM/GP |
|---|---|---|---|---|---|---|---|---|---|---|---|---|---|---|---|---|---|---|---|
| 2002 | Columbus Landsharks | 11 | 3 | 3 | 6 | 29 | 6 | 0.55 | 2.64 | 0.55 | – | – | – | – | – | – | – | – | – |
| 2003 | Columbus Landsharks | 16 | 28 | 24 | 52 | 51 | 12 | 3.25 | 3.19 | 0.75 | – | – | – | – | – | – | – | – | – |
| 2004 | Arizona Sting | 16 | 26 | 48 | 74 | 43 | 19 | 4.63 | 2.69 | 1.19 | – | – | – | – | – | – | – | – | – |
| 2005 | Arizona Sting | 16 | 48 | 36 | 84 | 73 | 8 | 5.25 | 4.56 | 0.50 | 3 | 10 | 5 | 15 | 16 | 2 | 5.00 | 5.33 | 0.67 |
| 2006 | Arizona Sting | 16 | 34 | 48 | 82 | 76 | 8 | 5.13 | 4.75 | 0.50 | 2 | 4 | 7 | 11 | 3 | 0 | 5.50 | 1.50 | 0.00 |
| 2007 | Arizona Sting | 16 | 47 | 60 | 107 | 65 | 16 | 6.69 | 4.06 | 1.00 | 3 | 6 | 12 | 18 | 5 | 0 | 6.00 | 1.67 | 0.00 |
| 2008 | Portland LumberJax | 16 | 38 | 43 | 81 | 96 | 11 | 5.06 | 6.00 | 0.69 | 3 | 15 | 16 | 31 | 14 | 2 | 10.33 | 4.67 | 0.67 |
| 2009 | Boston Blazers | 16 | 30 | 74 | 104 | 54 | 8 | 6.50 | 3.38 | 0.50 | 1 | 0 | 7 | 7 | 6 | 0 | 7.00 | 6.00 | 0.00 |
| 2010 | Boston Blazers | 16 | 36 | 52 | 88 | 75 | 36 | 5.50 | 4.69 | 2.25 | 1 | 1 | 7 | 8 | 5 | 0 | 8.00 | 5.00 | 0.00 |
| 2011 | Boston Blazers | 16 | 31 | 59 | 90 | 65 | 6 | 5.63 | 4.06 | 0.38 | 1 | 2 | 6 | 8 | 3 | 0 | 8.00 | 3.00 | 0.00 |
| 2012 | Philadelphia Wings | 16 | 25 | 78 | 103 | 58 | 8 | 6.44 | 3.63 | 0.50 | 1 | 1 | 5 | 6 | 5 | 0 | 6.00 | 5.00 | 0.00 |
| 2013 | Rochester Knighthawks | 16 | 23 | 52 | 75 | 67 | 4 | 4.69 | 4.19 | 0.25 | 3 | 6 | 8 | 14 | 7 | 0 | 4.67 | 2.33 | 0.00 |
| 2014 | Rochester Knighthawks | 18 | 19 | 72 | 91 | 60 | 8 | 5.06 | 3.33 | 0.44 | 3 | 7 | 7 | 14 | 1 | 0 | 4.67 | 0.33 | 0.00 |
| 2015 | Rochester Knighthawks | 18 | 23 | 62 | 85 | 59 | 19 | 4.72 | 3.28 | 1.06 | 3 | 2 | 10 | 12 | 8 | 0 | 4.00 | 2.67 | 0.00 |
| 2016 | Rochester Knighthawks | 18 | 40 | 55 | 95 | 62 | 12 | 5.28 | 3.44 | 0.67 | – | – | – | – | – | – | – | – | – |
| 2017 | Rochester Knighthawks | 15 | 18 | 36 | 54 | 41 | 21 | 3.60 | 2.73 | 1.40 | – | – | – | – | – | – | – | – | – |
| 2018 | Rochester Knighthawks | 8 | 9 | 17 | 26 | 13 | 2 | 3.25 | 1.63 | 0.25 | – | – | – | – | – | – | – | – | – |
| 2018 | Saskatchewan Rush | 5 | 2 | 9 | 11 | 11 | 0 | 2.20 | 2.20 | 0.00 | 1 | 1 | 0 | 1 | 1 | 0 | 1.00 | 1.00 | 0.00 |
| 2019 | San Diego Seals | 18 | 29 | 59 | 88 | 49 | 8 | 4.89 | 2.72 | 0.44 | 1 | 1 | 4 | 5 | 1 | 0 | 5.00 | 1.00 | 0.00 |
| 2020 | Toronto Rock | 10 | 17 | 23 | 40 | 21 | 7 | 4.00 | 2.10 | 0.70 | – | – | – | – | – | – | – | – | – |
| 2022 | Toronto Rock | 14 | 17 | 28 | 45 | 34 | 2 | 3.21 | 2.43 | 0.14 | 3 | 2 | 4 | 6 | 11 | 0 | 2.00 | 3.67 | 0.00 |
| 2023 | Toronto Rock | 12 | 8 | 16 | 24 | 19 | 10 | 2.00 | 1.58 | 0.83 | 2 | 1 | 6 | 7 | 3 | 0 | 3.50 | 1.50 | 0.00 |
| | | 323 | 551 | 954 | 1,505 | 1,121 | 231 | 4.66 | 3.47 | 0.72 | 31 | 59 | 104 | 163 | 89 | 4 | 5.26 | 2.87 | 0.13 |
| Career Total: | | 354 | 610 | 1,058 | 1,668 | 1,210 | 235 | 4.71 | 3.42 | 0.66 | | | | | | | | | |

GP–Games played; G–Goals; A–Assists; Pts–Points; LB–Loose balls; PIM–Penalty minutes; Pts/GP–Points per games played; LB/GP–Loose balls per games played; PIM/GP–Penalty minutes per games played.

=== CLA ===
| Season | Team | League | GP | G | A | Pts | PIM | NRB |
|---|---|---|---|---|---|---|---|---|
| 1998 | Brampton | JR A | 21 | 8 | 17 | 25 | 8 | 43 |
| 1999 | Brampton | JR A | 20 | 2 | 12 | 14 | 10 | 38 |
| 2000 | Brampton | JR A | 19 | 11 | 17 | 28 | 24 | 52 |
| 2001 | Brampton | JR A | 20 | 13 | 28 | 41 | 10 | 56 |
| 2002 | Brampton | OLA | 4 | 4 | 1 | 5 | 0 | 51 |
| 2003 | Brampton | OLA | 14 | 7 | 11 | 18 | 12 | 47 |
| 2004 | Brampton | OLA | 16 | 17 | 23 | 40 | 13 | 49 |
| 2005 | Victoria | WLA | 6 | 8 | 17 | 25 | 17 | 89 |
| 2006 | Victoria | WLA | 15 | 19 | 34 | 53 | 17 | - |
| 2007 | Victoria | WLA | 15 | 39 | 41 | 80 | 16 | - |
| 2008 | Brampton | OLA | 14 | 16 | 25 | 41 | 16 | - |
| 2009 | Brampton | OLA | 8 | 15 | 18 | 33 | 2 | - |
| 2010 | Brampton | OLA | 6 | 11 | 22 | 33 | 10 | - |
| 2011 | Brampton | OLA | 12 | 14 | 32 | 46 | 11 | - |
| 2012 | Brampton | OLA | 7 | 4 | 15 | 19 | 0 | - |
| CLA Totals | | | 217 | 219 | 360 | 579 | 196 |

== Awards ==
| Preceded by Dan Carey | NLL Sportsmanship Award; 2009 | Succeeded by Shawn Williams |
| Preceded by Athan Iannucci | NLL Most Valuable Player; 2009 | Succeeded by Casey Powell |
| Preceded by Cody Jamieson | Champion's Cup MVP; 2014 | Succeeded by Mark Matthews |
