= Ken Montour =

Haudenosaunee lacrosse player

Personal information
- Nickname: Monster
- Nationality: Haudenosaunee
- Born: September 9, 1979 (age 47) Six Nations, Ontario, Canada
- Height: 5 ft 11 in (180 cm)
- Weight: 190 lb (86 kg; 13 st 8 lb)

Sport
- Position: Goalie
- Shoots: Right
- NLL draft: 26th overall, 1999; Albany Attack
- NLL teams: Buffalo Bandits; Philadelphia Wings; Arizona Sting; Columbus Landsharks
- Pro career: 2002–2010

Ken "Monster" Montour (born September 9, 1979 in Six Nations of the Grand River First Nation) is a former professional box lacrosse player in the National Lacrosse League. Montour played 8 seasons in the NLL, most of them with the Buffalo Bandits. Montour is an Ontario Lacrosse Hall of Fame, NLL Champion & Mann Cup Champion.

== National Lacrosse League ==
Ken Montour was drafted in the 4th round, 26th overall by the Albany attack in 1999.

During the 2001 season, he made his professional debut. He appeared in 6 games that season, and had a record of 1 win and no loses. He had a save % of 0.676 during his first year as a pro.

During the 2009 NLL season, he was named a starter to the All-Star Game and was also named NLL Goaltender of the Year.

During the 2010 season, Montour was hit by Toronto Rock defender Drew Petkoff and suffered a concussion. Montour finished the game but has not played since. He has also missed all but one half-day in his job as a teacher.

In 2017, He was inducted into the Ontario lacrosse hall of fame

== Early in his Career ==
Being from Six Nations, Ken Montour began his lacrosse journey as a young boy playing minor box lacrosse on Six Nations. He had early success in his minor playing days; he received several accolades, like the Larry Ruse Award for a leading goalkeeper in a midget in the OLA and a Gold medal in the Indigenous Games field lacrosse in St. Paul, Minnesota in 1995.

As a member of the Six Nations Arrows, he was named the 1999 Ontario Junior A Lacrosse League Most Valuable Player and was a Tom Longboat Award Finalist. After playing for the Arrows, where he was just named to the team’s Hall of Fame, he played almost all of his summer lacrosse as a senior for the Chiefs, except for 2001 and 2002, where he made the move out west and played for the Western Lacrosse Association’s Coquitlam Adanacs, helping Coquitlam win their first ever a Mann Cup in 2001.

At the university field lacrosse level, Montour was a member of the four-time Ontario championship teams at Brock University, and was named an Ontario University Athletics All-Star, and was the MVP of the 2003 championship game

== International play ==
Ken Montour also competed internationally with the Iroquois Nationals. In 1996 and 1999, he represented the Iroquois Nationals Under-19 Field team in Japan and Australia. The 1999 team won bronze. In 2002,& 2007, he represented the Iroquois Nationals Mens Box team and competed in In the Box Lacrosse Championship. He was instrumental in the success of the team in those years, helping the team finish second in both tournaments.

== Statistics ==
=== NLL ===
		Regular Season						Playoffs
Season	Team	GP	Min	GA	Sv	GAA	Sv %	GP	Min	GA	Sv	GAA	Sv %
2002	Buffalo	6	62	22	46	21.46	67.65%	--	--	--	--	--	--
2002	Columbus	3	125	31	96	14.84	75.59%	--	--	--	--	--	--
2003	Columbus	16	147	36	78	14.74	68.42%	--	--	--	--	--	--
2005	Arizona	7	208	39	108	11.24	73.47%	3	0	0	0	0.00	0.00%
2006	Arizona	0	0	0	0	0.00	0.00%	--	--	--	--	--	--
2006	Buffalo	4	0	0	0	0.00	0.00%	1	17	2	12	6.87	85.71%
2007	Philadelphia	12	102	21	48	12.30	69.57%	--	--	--	--	--	--
2008	Buffalo	15	480	82	346	10.24	80.84%	3	60	12	41	12.00	77.36%
2009	Buffalo	15	651	104	451	9.58	81.26%	2	104	16	74	9.21	82.22%
2010	Buffalo	7	385	70	260	10.90	78.79%	--	--	--	--	--	--
NLL totals		85	2,161	405	1,433	11.24	77.97%	9	182	30	127	9.91	80.89%

Note: GP = Games played; Min = Minutes played; GA = Goals-against; GAA = Goals-against average; Sv = Shots saved; SV% = Save percentage;

== Awards ==
2001 - Mann Cup with Coquitlam Adanacs 2009 - NLL Championship

Preceded by Bob Watson	NLL Goaltender of the Year; 2009	Succeeded by Matt Vinc
