= Jason Bloom (lacrosse) =

Canadian lacrosse player

Personal information
- Nickname: Bloomer
- Nationality: Canadian
- Born: September 4, 1982 (age 43) Coquitlam, British Columbia, Canada
- Height: 6 ft 0 in (183 cm)
- Weight: 205 lb (93 kg; 14 st 9 lb)

Sport
- Position: Forward
- Shoots: Right
- NLL team Former teams: Washington Stealth; Colorado Mammoth, Boston Blazers
- Pro career: 2007–

Jason Bloom (born September 4, 1982, in Coquitlam, British Columbia) is a lacrosse player on the Washington Stealth of the National Lacrosse League. He also played for Coquitlam Adanacs of the Western Lacrosse Association in the summer of 2006. Bloom was the captain of the Under-19 British Columbia Selects, MVP of the B.C. Provincials in 1999, two-time gold medal winner at the Canadian Nationals with the B.C. Selects (1999, 2000) and was selected to the first team British Columbia Major Junior A All-Star team in 2001 for hockey.

== College career ==
Bloom earned a psychology degree from Ohio State University, where he captained the Buckeyes in 2004 and 2005. He was a four-time Ohio State Scholar-Athlete and a two-time Academic All-Big Ten selection.

== Professional career ==
Bloom played two season with the Colorado Mammoth, before being traded to the Boston Blazers for current Colorado captain John Gallant. Bloom joined the Boston Blazers for their inaugural season during the 2009 NLL season, and was named NLL Transition Player of the Week during 2009. Bloom was traded in June 2009 to the Washington Stealth, and was named team captain shortly thereafter. Bloom helped the Stealth win the 2010 NLL Championship, and is the youngest captain in the NLL to ever do so. Has a young family and works in commercial real estate in Seattle for GVA Kidder Mathews.

== Statistics ==
=== NLL ===
		Regular Season						Playoffs
Season	Team	GP	G	A	Pts	LB	PIM	GP	G	A	Pts	LB	PIM
2007	Colorado	10	2	9	11	33	10	1	0	0	0	5	6
2008	Colorado	9	5	6	11	19	4	0	0	0	0	0	0
2009	Boston	16	13	10	23	60	5	1	0	0	0	2	0
2010	Washington	16	2	8	11	111	20	3	0	2	2	14	0
NLL totals		51	22	34	56	223	59	5	0	2	2	21	8
