= Stephen Peyser =

American lacrosse player

Personal information
- Nationality: American
- Born: July 28, 1986 (age 39) Lloyd Harbor, New York, U.S.
- Height: 6 ft 2 in (188 cm)
- Weight: 220 lb (100 kg; 15 st 10 lb)

Sport
- Position: Midfield
- NLL draft: 23rd overall, 2008; New York Titans
- NLL teams: Orlando Titans; New York Titans
- MLL team: Long Island Lizards
- NCAA team: Johns Hopkins University
- Pro career: 2008–

Stephen Peyser (born July 28, 1986) is an American former professional lacrosse player. He played with the Long Island Lizards of Major League Lacrosse and the Orlando Titans and New York Titans of the National Lacrosse League. He played the midfield position.

== Collegiate career ==
Peyser won two national championships while playing with the Johns Hopkins Blue Jays. As a freshman, he played in all sixteen games and helped the Blue Jays win the 2005 NCAA Division I Men's Lacrosse Championship. In 2006, Peyser missed a significant part of the season due to a broken jaw suffered prior to the season. In his junior season he was awarded USILA third team All-American honors, and again helped his team win the national championship. Peyser was named to the 2007 NCAA Division I Men's Lacrosse Championship All-tournament team for his efforts in the tournament. As a senior, Peyser and the Blue Jays were again in the national championship game; however, this time they were defeated by the Syracuse Orange.

As collegiate lacrosse has developed more specialists, Peyser's abilities as both a face-off man and offensive and defensive midfielder contributed to the Blue Jays success during his collegiate career.

== Professional career ==
Peyser began his professional career with the New Jersey Pride in 2008. The Pride drafted Peyser 5th overall in the first round of the 2008 MLL Collegiate Draft. Peyser joined the New Jersey Pride which already featured his two older brothers, Michael and Gregory. During Week 6 of the 2008 MLL season, the Peyser brothers (Michael, Gregory, and Stephen) became the first trio of brothers to play on the same Major League Lacrosse team together.

Peyser has had an immediate impact on the league, and was named Rookie of the Week for Week 11 of the 2008 season.

He also joined his brother Greg as a member of the indoor lacrosse 2009 New York Titans. During the season, he was named to the All-Star Game as an injury replacement.

Peyser worked in finance throughout his professional lacrosse career. He began working for JPMorgan in 2003 and later worked for Goldman Sachs and Bank of America.

== Statistics ==
=== NLL ===
		Regular Season						Playoffs
Season	Team	GP	G	A	Pts	LB	PIM	GP	G	A	Pts	LB	PIM
2009	New York	15	1	16	17	137	31	3	0	1	1	36	8
2010	Orlando	8	2	0	2	52	13	1	0	1	1	6	2
NLL totals		23	3	16	19	189	44	4	0	2	2	42	10
