= 2009 NLL season =

- League: National Lacrosse League
- Sport: Indoor lacrosse
- Duration: January 3, 2009 – May 15, 2009
- Games: 16
- Teams: 12

Regular season
- Top scorer: Colin Doyle (San Jose)

Playoffs
- Eastern champions: New York Titans
- Eastern runners-up: Buffalo Bandits
- Western champions: Calgary Roughnecks
- Western runners-up: San Jose Stealth

Champion's Cup
- Champions: Calgary Roughnecks (2nd title)
- Runners-up: New York Titans
- Finals MVP: Josh Sanderson

NLL seasons
- ← 2008 season 2010 season →

The 2009 National Lacrosse League season, the 23rd in the history of the NLL, began January 3, 2009 in Buffalo, Portland, and Sunrise, Florida, and concluded with the Calgary Roughnecks defeating the New York Titans 12—10 in the Champion's Cup on May 15, 2009 in Calgary, Alberta, Canada.

== Team movement ==
After the 2008 season was cancelled and then reinstated, the Boston Blazers and Arizona Sting both announced that they would not participate in the 2008 season, and would return in 2009. However, in the summer of 2008 the Arizona Sting ceased operations and its players were put in a dispersal draft. The Blazers drafted former Sting and LumberJax forward Dan Dawson first overall.

Just weeks prior to the start of the season, the Chicago Shamrox suspended operations due to financial troubles and the players were placed in another dispersal draft. Anthony Cosmo was selected 1st overall by the Boston Blazers in this draft.

Finally, while not a franchise relocation, the Minnesota Swarm were moved from the East Division to the West Division.

=== Teams ===
2009 National Lacrosse League
Division	Team	City	Arena	Capacity
East	Boston Blazers	Boston, Massachusetts	TD Garden	17,850
East	Buffalo Bandits	Buffalo, New York	HSBC Arena	18,690
East	New York Titans	Newark, New Jersey	Prudential Center	17,625
East	Philadelphia Wings	Philadelphia, Pennsylvania	Wachovia Center	19,523
East	Rochester Knighthawks	Rochester, New York	Blue Cross Arena	10,662
East	Toronto Rock	Toronto, Ontario	Air Canada Centre	18,800
West	Calgary Roughnecks	Calgary, Alberta	Pengrowth Saddledome	19,289
West	Colorado Mammoth	Denver, Colorado	Pepsi Center	18,007
West	Edmonton Rush	Edmonton, Alberta	Rexall Place	16,839
West	Minnesota Swarm	Saint Paul, Minnesota	XCEL Energy Center	18,064
West	Portland Lumberjax	Portland, Oregon	Rose Garden	18,280
West	San Jose Stealth	San Jose, California	HP Pavilion	17,496

=== Map of teams ===
East Division West Division

== Final standings ==
East Division
P	Team	GP	W	L	PCT	GB	Home	Road	GF	GA	Diff	GF/GP	GA/GP
1	New York Titans – xy	16	10	6	.625	0.0	5–3	5–3	190	180	+10	11.88	11.25
2	Buffalo Bandits – x	16	10	6	.625	0.0	5–3	5–3	223	170	+53	13.94	10.62
3	Boston Blazers – x	16	10	6	.625	0.0	4–4	6–2	181	168	+13	11.31	10.50
4	Rochester Knighthawks – x	16	7	9	.438	3.0	6–2	1–7	169	197	−28	10.56	12.31
5	Philadelphia Wings	16	7	9	.438	3.0	4–4	3–5	188	193	−5	11.75	12.06
6	Toronto Rock	16	6	10	.375	4.0	3–5	3–5	194	218	−24	12.12	13.62

West Division
P	Team	GP	W	L	PCT	GB	Home	Road	GF	GA	Diff	GF/GP	GA/GP
1	Calgary Roughnecks – xyz	16	12	4	.750	0.0	5–3	7–1	206	167	+39	12.88	10.44
2	Portland LumberJax – x	16	9	7	.562	3.0	4–4	5–3	181	177	+4	11.31	11.06
3	San Jose Stealth – x	16	7	9	.438	5.0	5–3	2–6	200	185	+15	12.50	11.56
4	Colorado Mammoth – x	16	7	9	.438	5.0	4–4	3–5	172	184	−12	10.75	11.50
5	Minnesota Swarm	16	6	10	.375	6.0	2–6	4–4	174	198	−24	10.88	12.38
6	Edmonton Rush	16	5	11	.312	7.0	4–4	1–7	159	200	−41	9.94	12.50

x: Clinched playoff berth; c: Clinched playoff berth by crossing over to another division; y: Clinched division; z: Clinched best regular season record; GP: Games Played
W: Wins; L: Losses; GB: Games back; PCT: Win percentage; Home: Record at Home; Road: Record on the Road; GF: Goals scored; GA: Goals allowed
Differential: Difference between goals scored and allowed; GF/GP: Average number of goals scored per game; GA/GP: Average number of goals allowed per game

=== Playoffs ===
Divisional Semifinal
E1	New York	11
E4	Rochester	10
Eastern Division
E2	Buffalo	11
E3	Boston	8
W1	Calgary	15
W4	Colorado	8
Western Division
W2	Portland	16
W3	San Jose	20

Divisional Final
E1	New York	9
E2	Buffalo	3
W1	Calgary	17
W3	San Jose	5

Champion's Cup Final
E1	New York	10
W1	Calgary	12

== Milestones and events ==
=== Pre-season ===
- August 19, 2008: The NLL announced that the Minnesota Swarm would be moving from the East division to the West division, giving the West six teams to the East's seven.
- August 22, 2008: Chicago Shamrox goalie Matt Roik was traded to the San Jose Stealth with two first round draft picks in exchange for veteran goalie Anthony Cosmo.
- September 2, 2008: The Rochester Knighthawks announce that Paul Suggate will be the new head coach. Freeman Bucktooth and former team captain Mike Hasen were also named assistant coaches.
- September 7, 2008: Just hours before the entry draft, the Toronto Rock, San Jose Stealth, and Rochester Knighthawks made a blockbuster trade. Toronto sent Aaron Wilson and a 2009 first round draft pick to Rochester, who sent Stephen Hoar back to Toronto. Toronto also received Luke Wiles from San Jose, while San Jose gets Rochester's first round pick in the 2008 entry draft.
- September 9, 2008: Rochester Knighthawks star John Grant, Jr. announced that he would miss the entire 2009 season after undergoing emergency surgery to remove an infection in the ACL in his left knee.
- September 25: The NLL announced that a regular season game will be played between the New York Titans and the Toronto Rock at BankAtlantic Center in Sunrise, Florida, a suburb of Fort Lauderdale. The game will be known as the Florida Lacrosse Cup. This will be the first pro lacrosse game ever played in the state. The event was spearheaded by former Rock and Philadelphia Wings forward Kevin Finneran.
- October 15, 2008: The Rochester Knighthawks acquired the rights to lacrosse legend Gary Gait from the Colorado Mammoth for forward Andrew Potter and first-round draft picks in both 2009 and 2010. Gait, whose single-season scoring record was shattered during the 2008 season by Athan Iannucci, originally retired from the NLL after the 2005 season.
- November 11, 2008: Legendary goaltender Dallas Eliuk announced that he will not play in 2009, taking a job as an assistant coach with the Portland LumberJax. Eliuk did not officially announce his retirement until December 9. Eliuk won four NLL championships, all with the Wings, and is the NLL's all-time leader in saves.
- November 25, 2008: Rochester Knighthawks GM Regy Thorpe signed a playing contract, becoming the first player-GM in NLL history.
- December 24, 2008: Less than four months after taking the job and without a single regular season game under his belt, Paul Suggate resigned his position as Rochester head coach. No reason was given for Suggate's resignation. Only two days later, the Knighthawks announced that lacrosse legend Paul Gait had been hired as head coach.

=== Regular season ===
- January 3, 2009: The Toronto Rock won the first-ever Florida Lacrosse Cup, defeating the New York Titans 15-14 to open the season. Blaine Manning scored the winner, his fourth goal of the game, with 38 seconds left in regulation time to seal the victory, and was named Overall Player of the Week.
- January 10, 2009: Jim Jennings announced his resignation as commissioner of the NLL, stating: "I feel that I have accomplished all the goals I set out to do at the NLL. I want to spend some time with my family before pursuing other opportunities and taking on the next challenge." NLL Deputy Commissioner and COO George Daniel was named Interim Commissioner.
- January 10, 2009: Gary Gait scored five goals in his return to the NLL, but Rochester lost to Philadelphia 16-13.
- January 16, 2009: In a 23-6 loss at Buffalo, the Rochester Knighthawks allowed the most goals in a single game in their history. The 17-point defeat was also their most lopsided loss ever.
- January 20, 2009: Only three games into the season, the Toronto Rock fired head coach Glenn Clark and assistant coach Terry Bullen and hired former Chicago Shamrox and Colorado Mammoth coach Jamie Batley as the new head coach. Assistant coach Jim Veltman was relieved of his coaching duties, but remained with the Rock as an advisor.
- February 10, 2009: The league announced that Dallas Eliuk and Jim Veltman will be inducted into the National Lacrosse League Hall of Fame in March, 2009.
- February 14, 2009: Mark Steenhuis of the Buffalo Bandits scored 13 assists and 17 points in a 25-10 win over Toronto breaking the league's single-game records for assists and points. The records were previously held by Derek Malawsky (11 assists in 2002) and John Grant Jr. (15 points in 2007) both of the Rochester Knighthawks.
- March 20, 2009: The San Jose Stealth announced that offensive coordinator Chris Hall has been named head coach, while former head coach Jeff Dowling will take over Hall's post as offensive coordinator.
- April 11, 2009: San Jose Stealth rookie Rhys Duch scored five goals and added three assists, giving him 86 points for the season, breaking Gavin Prout's rookie scoring record. In the same game, Stealth captain Colin Doyle tied Josh Sanderson's single-season assists record of 71.
- April 17, 2009: Calgary's Josh Sanderson finished the season with 74 assists, breaking his own single-season record of 71. The next night, Boston's Dan Dawson had five assists, tying him with Sanderson for the league lead and record.
- April 18, 2009: Rhys Duch extends his new rookie scoring record to 89, with one goal and two assists against the Toronto Rock.

=== Post-season ===
- April 22, 2009: After missing the playoffs for the sixth time in seven years, the Philadelphia Wings fired GM Lindsay Sanderson. The Wings were 38-42 during Sanderson's five-year tenure, and only made the playoffs once.
- April 29, 2009: Toronto Rock Director of Lacrosse Operations Mike Kloepfer announced his resignation. The Rock were 19-29 in three years under Kloepfer, missing the playoffs in both 2008 and 2009.
- May 4, 2009: The Portland LumberJax announced that they will not be playing in Portland next season. Executive vice president Brian Silcott said that the team will not fold, but they are looking at either moving or selling the franchise; the franchise did fold, however.
- May 9, 2009: Both division final games featured outstanding performances by the winning goaltenders. In New York, Matt Vinc stopped 41 out of 44 shots and kept the Buffalo Bandits to only three goals as the Titans defeated Buffalo 9-3. In Calgary, Matt King shut the San Jose Stealth out for the first three quarters and even scored a goal of his own - the game-winner - as Calgary destroyed the Stealth 17-5.
- May 15, 2009: The Calgary Roughnecks defeated the New York Titans 12-10 to capture their second Champions Cup title.
- May 19, 2009: The Edmonton Rush fired head coach and GM Bob Hamley after finishing last in the West for the second straight season.

== All-Star game ==
The 2009 All-Star Game was held at Pepsi Center in Denver on March 7, 2009. The East beat the West 27-21 as Buffalo's Mark Steenhuis scored seven goals and six assists on his way to his third All-Star Game MVP award.

=== All-Star teams ===
Eastern Division starters	Western Division starters
Dan Dawson, Boston	Colin Doyle, San Jose
Casey Powell, New York *	Josh Sanderson, Calgary
Mark Steenhuis, Buffalo	Dan Teat, Edmonton
Geoff Snider, Philadelphia *	Brodie Merrill, Portland
Chris White, Buffalo	Bruce Murray, Colorado
Ken Montour, Buffalo (goalie)	Matt Disher, Portland (goalie)
Eastern Division reserves	Western Division reserves
Jason Crosbie, Toronto	Brian Langtry, Colorado
Gary Gait, Rochester	Peter Morgan, Portland
Pat Maddalena, New York	Gavin Prout, Colorado
John Tavares, Buffalo	Tracey Kelusky, Calgary
Roger Vyse, Buffalo	Jeff Zywicki, San Jose
Shawn Williams, Rochester	Nick Carlson, Colorado
Jordan Hall, New York	Jeff Shattler, Calgary
Mitch Belisle, Boston	Ryan Cousins, Minnesota
Greg Peyser, New York *	Ian Hawksbee, Edmonton
Kyle Sweeney, Philadelphia	Nick Inch, Minnesota
Cam Woods, Toronto *	Jeff Moleski, Calgary
Anthony Cosmo, Boston (goalie)	Andrew Leyshon, Colorado (goalie)
Drew Westervelt, Philadelphia (injury replacement)	
Brendan Mundorf, New York (injury replacement)	
Jarett Park, New York (injury replacement)	
Stephen Peyser, New York (injury replacement)	

* Unable to play due to injury

== Awards ==
=== Annual ===
Award	Winner	Team
Most Valuable Player	Dan Dawson	Boston Blazers
Goaltender of the Year	Ken Montour	Buffalo Bandits
Defensive Player of the Year	Billy Dee Smith	Buffalo Bandits
Transition Player of the Year	Brodie Merrill	Portland Lumberjax
Rookie of the Year	Rhys Duch	San Jose Stealth
Sportsmanship Award	Dan Dawson	Boston Blazers
GM of the Year	Ed Comeau	New York Titans
Les Bartley Award	Troy Cordingley	Calgary Roughnecks
Executive of the Year Award	John J. Arlotta	Minnesota Swarm
Tom Borrelli Award	Paul Tutka	

=== All-Pro teams ===
First Team

- Dan Dawson, Boston
- Colin Doyle, San Jose
- Casey Powell, New York
- Brodie Merrill, Portland
- Billy Dee Smith, Buffalo
- Ken Montour, Buffalo

Second Team

- Josh Sanderson, Calgary
- John Tavares, Buffalo
- Jordan Hall, New York
- Mark Steenhuis, Buffalo
- Mac Allen, Rochester
- Anthony Cosmo, Boston

=== All-Rookie team ===
- Rhys Duch, San Jose
- Daryl Veltman, Boston
- Kevin Buchanan, Minnesota
- Stephen Peyser, New York
- Jon Harnett, Boston
- Tyler Richards, San Jose

=== Weekly awards ===
The NLL gives out awards weekly for the best overall player, best offensive player, best transition player, best defensive player, and best rookie.

Month	Week	Overall	Offensive	Defensive	Transition	Rookie
January	1	Blaine Manning	Casey Powell	Kevin Croswell	Scott Stewart	Andrew Watt
January	2	Gary Gait	Pat Maddalena	Ken Montour	Brodie Merrill	Sean Thomson
January	3	Mark Steenhuis	Mark Steenhuis	Ken Montour	Greg Peyser	Daryl Veltman
January	4	Dan Teat	Dan Dawson	Michael Thompson	Tyler Codron	Daryl Veltman
January	5	Matt Disher	Mike Accursi	Matt Disher	Curtis Hodgson	Matt Danowski
February	6	Gary Bining	Tracey Kelusky	Pat Campbell	Chris Driscoll	Gary Bining
February	7	Mark Steenhuis	Mark Steenhuis	Anthony Cosmo	Jason Bloom	Tyler Crompton
February	8	Dan Dawson	Mark Steenhuis	Jon Harnett	Bobby McBride	Rhys Duch
February	9	Shawn Evans	Shawn Evans	Matt Disher	Kyle Ross	Kevin Buchanan
March	10	Shawn Evans	Shawn Evans	Sandy Chapman	Pat McCready	Kevin Buchanan
March	11	Bob Watson	John Tavares	Ken Montour	Paul Rabil	Tyler Crompton
March	12	Athan Iannucci	Andy Secore	Matt Vinc	Brodie Merrill	Rhys Duch
March	13	John Tavares	Colin Doyle	Tyler Richards	Brodie Merrill	Rhys Duch
April	14	Anthony Cosmo	Merrick Thomson	Matt Disher	Scott Stewart	Rhys Duch
April	15	Pat O'Toole	Sean Morris	Ray Guze	Steve Toll	Daryl Veltman

=== Monthly awards ===
Awards are also given out monthly for the best overall player and best rookie.

Month	Overall	Rookie
January	Casey Powell	Daryl Veltman
February	Mark Steenhuis	Daryl Veltman
March	Bob Watson	Rhys Duch

== Statistics leaders ==
Bold numbers indicate new single-season records. Italics indicate tied single-season records.

Stat	Player	Team	Total
Goals	Mark Steenhuis	Buffalo	51
Goals	John Tavares	Buffalo	51
Assists	Dan Dawson	Boston	**74**
Assists	Josh Sanderson	Calgary	**74**
Points	Colin Doyle	San Jose	111
Penalty Minutes	Eric Martin	San Jose	89
Shots on Goal	Mark Steenhuis	Buffalo	186
Loose Balls	Geoff Snider	Philadelphia	220
Save Pct	Ken Montour	Buffalo	.813
GAA	Ken Montour	Buffalo	9.57

== Attendance ==
=== Regular season ===
Home team	Home games	Average attendance	Total Attendance
Buffalo Bandits	8	17,947	143,581
Colorado Mammoth	8	16,475	131,800
Toronto Rock	8	13,921	111,372
Minnesota Swarm	8	12,308	98,465
Philadelphia Wings	8	10,537	84,299
Calgary Roughnecks	8	10,398	83,189
Edmonton Rush	8	8,347	66,783
Rochester Knighthawks	8	7,516	60,132
Portland LumberJax	8	7,320	58,564
Boston Blazers	8	6,620	52,966
New York Titans	8	4,692	37,542
San Jose Stealth	8	4,129	33,038
**League**	**96**	**10,018**	**961,731**

=== Playoffs ===
Home team	Home games	Average attendance	Total Attendance
Buffalo Bandits	1	13,343	13,343
Calgary Roughnecks	3	10,813	32,441
Portland LumberJax	1	6,053	6,053
New York Titans	2	5,261	10,522
**League**	**7**	**8,908**	**62,359**

== See also ==
- 2009 in sports
