= Steve Toll =

Personal information
- Nickname: Speedin' Stevie
- Nationality: Canadian
- Born: June 16, 1974 (age 52) St. Catharines, Ontario
- Height: 6 ft 0 in (183 cm)
- Weight: 195 lb (88 kg; 13 st 13 lb)

Sport
- Position: Transition
- Shoots: Right
- NLL draft: 43rd overall, 1997; Ontario Raiders
- NLL teams: Edmonton Rush; Colorado Mammoth; Rochester Knighthawks; San Jose Stealth; Toronto Rock; Ontario Raiders
- Pro career: 1998–2012

Steve Toll (born June 16, 1974 in St. Catharines, Ontario) is a Canadian retired dual-sport athlete. In his 14-year National Lacrosse League career, Toll won five NLL Championships four with the Toronto Rock and one with the Rochester Knighthawks. He was a transition specialist, and in 2007 was awarded the first ever National Lacrosse League Transition Player of the Year Award. Toll also played professional hockey in the East Coast Hockey League for the Raleigh Icecaps, and played for 3 different teams in the Central Hockey League.

In October 2011, Toll announced that he was retiring from the NLL to become the Director of Operations for the Durham and Oshawa franchises of the new Canadian Lacrosse League (CLax).

== Junior career ==
Toll had one of the greatest junior lacrosse careers in St. Catharines Athletics history. Toll would finish his five-year tenure with the A's as the all-time leader in assists (355) and points (607) (regular season and playoffs combined).

== Hockey career ==
Toll played ice hockey and lacrosse for Rochester Institute of Technology; he was named the NCAA Division III Men's Ice Hockey Player of the Year in 1997. Toll also played professional hockey in the East Coast Hockey League and Central Hockey League.

== Statistics ==
=== NLL ===
Steve Toll		Regular season									Playoffs								
Season	Team	GP	G	A	Pts	LB	PIM	Pts/GP	LB/GP	PIM/GP	GP	G	A	Pts	LB	PIM	Pts/GP	LB/GP	PIM/GP
1998	Ontario Raiders	1	0	0	0	2	0	0.00	2.00	0.00	–	–	–	–	–	–	–	–	–
1999	Toronto Rock	1	0	1	1	4	0	1.00	4.00	0.00	2	2	1	3	10	5	1.50	5.00	2.50
2000	Toronto Rock	12	9	13	22	78	6	1.83	6.50	0.50	2	1	8	9	18	0	4.50	9.00	0.00
2001	Toronto Rock	14	15	20	35	128	6	2.50	9.14	0.43	2	1	7	8	15	0	4.00	7.50	0.00
2002	Toronto Rock	16	26	39	65	125	11	4.06	7.81	0.69	2	1	3	4	8	0	2.00	4.00	0.00
2003	Toronto Rock	16	27	26	53	91	2	3.31	5.69	0.13	2	3	5	8	19	5	4.00	9.50	2.50
2004	Toronto Rock	16	19	34	53	141	5	3.31	8.81	0.31	1	0	1	1	6	0	1.00	6.00	0.00
2005	San Jose Stealth	12	4	8	12	76	0	1.00	6.33	0.00	–	–	–	–	–	–	–	–	–
2005	Rochester Knighthawks	5	5	5	10	33	0	2.00	6.60	0.00	2	2	5	7	21	0	3.50	10.50	0.00
2006	Rochester Knighthawks	16	14	18	32	119	6	2.00	7.44	0.38	2	3	2	5	15	0	2.50	7.50	0.00
2007	Rochester Knighthawks	16	14	24	38	177	2	2.38	11.06	0.13	3	2	3	5	28	2	1.67	9.33	0.67
2008	Rochester Knighthawks	16	7	25	32	166	8	2.00	10.38	0.50	–	–	–	–	–	–	–	–	–
2009	Rochester Knighthawks	16	4	13	17	178	6	1.06	11.13	0.38	1	1	0	1	12	2	1.00	12.00	2.00
2010	Rochester Knighthawks	16	5	8	13	153	10	0.81	9.56	0.63	–	–	–	–	–	–	–	–	–
2011	Colorado Mammoth	16	2	11	13	75	19	0.81	4.69	1.19	1	0	0	0	2	0	0.00	2.00	0.00
2012	Edmonton Rush	6	3	1	4	16	2	0.67	2.67	0.33	3	0	1	1	6	0	0.33	2.00	0.00
		195	154	246	400	1,562	83	2.05	8.01	0.43	23	16	36	52	160	14	2.26	6.96	0.61
Career Total:		218	170	282	452	1,722	97	2.07	7.90	0.44									

GP–Games played; G–Goals; A–Assists; Pts–Points; LB–Loose balls; PIM–Penalty minutes; Pts/GP–Points per games played; LB/GP–Loose balls per games played; PIM/GP–Penalty minutes per games played.

=== OLA ===
			Regular Season					Playoffs
Season	Team	League	GP	G	A	Pts	PIM	GP	G	A	Pts	PIM
1991	St. Catharines Athletics	OLA Jr.A	20	11	16	27	4	14	8	7	15	0
Minto Cup	St. Catharines Athletics	CLA	--	--	--	--	--	5	0	1	1	0
1992	St. Catharines Athletics	OLA Jr.A	20	29	56	85	41	14	19	14	33	34
1993	St. Catharines Athletics	OLA Jr.A	22	36	44	80	10	16	25	30	55	29
1994	St. Catharines Athletics	OLA Jr.A	21	40	57	97	31	12	22	37	59	42
1995	St. Catharines Athletics	OLA Jr.A	20	35	62	97	31	13	27	32	59	45
1996	Peterborough Lakers	MSL	24	45	48	93	16	5	6	8	14	0
1997	Niagara Falls Gamblers	MSL	18	21	36	57	8	11	9	12	21	24
Mann Cup	Niagara Falls Gamblers	CLA	--	--	--	--	--	5	3	6	9	30
1998	Buffalo Gamblers	MSL	11	12	13	25	8	9	5	6	11	8
1999	Brooklin Redmen	MSL	15	18	41	59	26	10	16	17	33	21
2000	Brooklin Redmen	MSL	13	13	33	46	30	11	14	18	32	20
Mann Cup	Brooklin Redmen	CLA	--	--	--	--	--	4	4	11	15	4
2001	Brooklin Redmen	MSL	14	26	46	72	40	10	13	20	33	16
2002	Brooklin Redmen	MSL	14	12	23	35	34	10	1	13	14	30
2003	Brooklin Redmen	MSL	3	3	6	9	5	10	13	11	24	6
2004	Brooklin Redmen	MSL	16	18	32	50	32	4	1	9	10	9
2005	Brooklin Redmen	MSL	17	11	41	52	40	--	--	--	--	--
2006	Brooklin Redmen	MSL	12	14	31	45	8	8	6	6	12	28
2007	Brooklin Redmen	MSL	12	4	25	29	2	--	--	--	--	--
2007	St. Regis Indians	MSL	7	4	3	7	2	10	6	2	8	2
2008	St. Regis Indians	MSL	16	8	12	20	2	9	5	5	10	16
2009	St. Regis Indians	MSL	18	13	32	45	44	9	2	11	13	22
2010	Peterborough Lakers	MSL	15	7	11	18	26	13	8	11	19	6
2011	Peterborough Lakers	MSL	17	3	13	16	10	6	0	3	3	10
Junior A Totals			103	151	235	386	117	69	101	120	221	150
Minto Cup Totals			--	--	--	--	--	5	0	1	1	0
Senior A Totals			210	222	422	644	297	116	97	138	235	202
Mann Cup Totals			--	--	--	--	--	9	7	17	24	33

Preceded by None	NLL Transition Player of the Year; 2007	Succeeded by Mark Steenhuis
