= Geoff Snider =

Canadian lacrosse player

Personal information
- Nationality: Canadian
- Born: 2 April 1981 (age 45) Calgary, Alberta, Canada
- Height: 5 ft 11 in (180 cm)
- Weight: 200 lb (91 kg; 14 st 4 lb)

Sport
- Position: FOGO/Midfield
- Shoots: Right
- NLL draft: 4th overall, 2006; Philadelphia Wings
- NLL team: Calgary Roughnecks; Philadelphia Wings
- MLL team Former teams: Charlotte Hounds; Rochester Rattlers
- MSL team: Peterborough Lakers
- Pro career: 2007–

Geoff Snider (born 2 April 1981) is a Canadian former professional lacrosse player.

== Amateur career ==
Growing up, Snider played for the Calgary Hornets in the Calgary District Lacrosse Association. His junior lacrosse career began with the Burnaby Lakers of the British Columbia Junior A Lacrosse League. In 1998, 2000 and 2002, he helped the Lakers win the Minto Cup as Canada's champion junior men's lacrosse team. He continued to play with the Senior "A" Coquitlam Adanacs in the Western Lacrosse Association, leading them to win the 2007 WLA championship.

Snider honed his physical game in the summer box lacrosse seasons and in junior hockey. With the junior ice hockey Calgary Canucks, of the Alberta Junior Hockey League, Snider racked up 415 penalty minutes during the 2001–02 season. In lacrosse he has developed a reputation as being one of lacrosse's top fighters.

== Collegiate career ==
Snider attended the University of Denver. In 2006, with the Pioneers he was named a third-team All-American. His 194 recorded groundballs as a senior holds the record for a single season groundballs in NCAA lacrosse. In addition he holds the standard for highest average groundballs per game in a season with 11.41.

== Professional career ==
=== NLL career ===
Snider was drafted by the Philadelphia Wings of the National Lacrosse League in the first round (fourth overall) of the 2006 NLL Entry Draft. Snider made an immediate impact on the league and was named the NLL's January Rookie of the Month. Snider scored 13 points (6G, 7A), collected 53 loose balls and won 53 of 79 face-off attempts in five games during his first month of action in the league. He was also the only rookie voted onto the 2007 All-Star team, and won the Accuracy challenge in the All-Star game Skills Competition. After the season, Snider was named to the 2007 All-Rookie team.

On 26 January 2008, Snider put his name in the record books again when he won the opening face-off in a game against the Buffalo Bandits and scored :05 seconds into the game. This goal is the league record for fastest goal to start a game.

In the 2008 season, Snider was named to the All-Star team, and was named game MVP after scoring three goals, recording 28 loose balls, and winning 31 out of 38 face-offs. He set league records in loose balls (244), faceoffs won (318), and penalty minutes (103), and fell just short of tying his own faceoff winning percentage record of 75%, winning 73.8% of his faceoffs.

During the 2009 NLL season, he was named a starter to the All-Star Game but was unable to play due to injury when he suffered a tracheal fracture (windpipe) in a game against the Edmonton Rush. Snider was also named to the 2012 All-Star game and scored 4 goals, added 2 assists, and won 22 of 26 faceoffs. Snider was named game MVP.

=== MLL ===
Snider was drafted by the Denver Outlaws of Major League Lacrosse in the second round of the MLL Collegiate Draft. During the 2007 MLL season, Snider played in the MLL All-Star Game representing the Western Conference. Snider has participated in two MLL championships. In 2008 with the Denver Outlaws, and in 2009 with the champion Toronto Nationals.

In 2012 he was traded to the Charlotte Hounds where he helped lead the team to its first playoff and championship appearance.

In December 2014 he was traded by the Charlotte Hounds to the Denver Outlaws for midfielder Terry Kimener.

=== MSL ===
On 30 June 2009 the Peterborough Lakers of Major Series Lacrosse announced they signed Snider. He played his first game as a Laker on 1 July and made his Peterborough debut on 2 July.

== International career ==
In international competition, Snider won the tournament MVP award at the 2006 World Lacrosse Championship, where he dominated face-offs helping the Canadian National Men's Lacrosse team win their first World Championship win since 1978.

== Statistics ==
=== NLL ===
Geoff Snider		Regular season									Playoffs								
Season	Team	GP	G	A	Pts	LB	PIM	Pts/GP	LB/GP	PIM/GP	GP	G	A	Pts	LB	PIM	Pts/GP	LB/GP	PIM/GP
2007	Philadelphia Wings	15	14	17	31	180	62	2.07	12.00	4.13	–	–	–	–	–	–	–	–	–
2008	Philadelphia Wings	16	13	38	51	244	103	3.19	15.25	6.44	1	0	1	1	6	0	1.00	6.00	0.00
2009	Philadelphia Wings	14	12	22	34	220	53	2.43	15.71	3.79	–	–	–	–	–	–	–	–	–
2010	Philadelphia Wings	16	19	22	41	245	79	2.56	15.31	4.94	–	–	–	–	–	–	–	–	–
2011	Calgary Roughnecks	14	9	7	16	171	74	1.14	12.21	5.29	2	1	3	4	25	0	2.00	12.50	0.00
2012	Calgary Roughnecks	14	11	13	24	232	55	1.71	16.57	3.93	1	0	1	1	20	2	1.00	20.00	2.00
2013	Calgary Roughnecks	15	17	11	28	235	69	1.87	15.67	4.60	2	0	3	3	41	2	1.50	20.50	1.00
2014	Calgary Roughnecks	18	17	16	33	209	45	1.83	11.61	2.50	1	2	0	2	10	2	2.00	10.00	2.00
2015	Calgary Roughnecks	14	4	7	11	121	42	0.79	8.64	3.00	3	1	2	3	26	4	1.00	8.67	1.33
		136	116	153	269	1,857	582	1.98	13.65	4.28	10	4	10	14	128	10	1.40	12.80	1.00
Career Total:		146	120	163	283	1,985	592	1.94	13.60	4.05									

GP–Games played; G–Goals; A–Assists; Pts–Points; LB–Loose balls; PIM–Penalty minutes; Pts/GP–Points per games played; LB/GP–Loose balls per games played; PIM/GP–Penalty minutes per games played.

=== MLL ===
		Regular Season								Playoffs
Season	Team	GP	G	2ptG	A	Pts	GB	PIM	FO	GP	G	2ptG	A	Pts	GB	PIM	FO
2006	Denver	3	1	0	0	1	9	0	9–28	1	1	0	0	1	5	10–28
2007	Denver	10	8	0	6	14	76	3.5	188–338	3	0	0	2	2	2	10–21
2008	Denver	12	9	0	1	10	78	6	175–363	2	0	0	0	0	14	21–51
2009	Toronto	12	12	1	8	21	87	16.5	195–385	2	1	0	0	1	8	26–53
MLL Totals		37	30	1	15	46	250	26	567–1114	7	2	0	2	4	29	5	67–153

=== NCAA ===
Season	Team	GP	G	A	Pts	GB	FO	FO%
2003	University of Denver	11	13	6	19	37	36–65
2004	University of Denver	14	15	1	16	51	77–151
2005	University of Denver	14	9	2	11	67	92–161
2006	University of Denver	17	21	10	31	194	242–354	.684
Totals		56	58	21	79	349	447–731	.611
