= Gregory Peyser =

American lacrosse player

Personal information
- Nationality: American
- Born: September 7, 1983 (age 42) Lloyd Harbor, New York, U.S.
- Height: 6 ft 1 in (185 cm)
- Weight: 210 lb (95 kg; 15 st 0 lb)

Sport
- Position: Midfield
- NLL draft: 29th overall, 2006; Portland LumberJax
- NLL teams: Orlando Titans; New York Titans
- MLL team Former teams: Long Island Lizards; New Jersey Pride; Philadelphia Barrage
- NCAA team: Johns Hopkins University
- Pro career: 2006–

Gregory Robert Peyser (born September 7, 1983 in Lloyd Harbor, New York) is an American professional lacrosse player with the Long Island Lizards of Major League Lacrosse. Peyser also played with the Orlando Titans and New York Titans of the National Lacrosse League. He played collegiate lacrosse at Johns Hopkins University. He plays midfield and is known as a face-off specialist.

== Collegiate career ==
Peyser was a team captain as a senior while playing for the Johns Hopkins Blue Jays. In his junior season he was awarded USILA third team All-American honors, and helped his team win the 2005 NCAA Division I Men's Lacrosse Championship game. He finished his career with the all-time leading face-off wins percentage in Blue Jays history.

In 2003, Peyser helped Team USA win its fifth consecutive Under-19 World Lacrosse Championships, and was honored with being named the tournaments Most Outstanding Midfielder.

== Professional career ==
Peyser began his professional career with the Philadelphia Barrage in 2006. The Barrage drafted Peyser 9th overall in the second round of the 2006 MLL Collegiate Draft.

Peyser has been a member of the New Jersey Pride since the 2007 season, when he joined his brother Michael on a team that already shared a number of brothers as teammates, including the Donegers and the Molletts. The Pride acquired Peyser in exchange for the team's first round selection in the 2007 MLL Collegiate Draft (which turned out to be Navy's Bill Looney). During the 2008 MLL Collegiate Draft, the Pride selected Peyser's younger brother Stephen. During Week 6 of the 2008 MLL season, the Peyser brothers (Michael, Gregory, and Stephen) became the first trio of brothers to play on the same Major League Lacrosse team together.

During the 2009 NLL season, he was named a reserve to the All-Star game but was unable to play due to injury.

== Arena Football League ==
In 2007, when the 2008 National Lacrosse League season was cancelled, Peyser, who had played football in high school, competed for a roster spot during try-outs for the Arena Football League's New York Dragons. He was eventually cut from the team and played the 2008 lacrosse season with the New York Titans once the season was reinstated.

== Statistics ==
=== MLL ===
		Regular Season							Playoffs
Season	Team	GP	G	2ptG	A	Pts	LB	PIM	GP	G	2ptG	A	Pts	LB	PIM
2006	Philadelphia	8	3	0	4	7	0	1.5	2	0	0	0	0	0	0
2007	New Jersey	11	9	0	6	15	0	6.5	0	0	0	0	0	0	0
2008	New Jersey	9	12	1	4	17	1	3.5	0	0	0	0	0	0	0
MLL Totals		28	24	1	14	39	1	11.5	2	0	0	0	0	0	0

=== NLL ===
		Regular Season						Playoffs
Season	Team	GP	G	A	Pts	LB	PIM	GP	G	A	Pts	LB	PIM
2007	New York	8	3	2	5	38	19	--	--	--	--	--	--
2008	New York	13	3	6	9	75	41	2	1	2	3	16	2
2009	New York	9	5	7	12	74	35	--	--	--	--	--	--
2010	Orlando	13	4	7	11	110	18	2	1	3	4	17	4
NLL totals		43	15	22	37	297	113	4	2	5	7	33	6
