= Phil Sanderson =

Canadian lacrosse player

Personal information
- Nickname: Flip
- Born: January 23, 1977 (age 49) Orangeville, Ontario, Canada
- Height: 5 ft 9 in (175 cm)
- Weight: 175 lb (79 kg; 12 st 7 lb)

Sport
- Position: Defenseman
- Shoots: Left
- NLL draft: 56th overall, 1997; Rochester Knighthawks
- NLL teams: Albany Attack; San Jose Stealth; Rochester Knighthawks; Buffalo Bandits
- MLL teams: Toronto Nationals
- Pro career: 2000–2012

Phil "Flip" Sanderson (born January 23, 1977, in Orangeville, Ontario) is a Canadian professional box lacrosse coach and former player. He is the current head coach of the Oakville Rock of Major Series Lacrosse. Sanderson is one of a number of Sandersons involved (or formerly involved) in the NLL, including his brother Nate and cousin Josh.

Phil was on the 1999 Rochester Knighthawks practice squad before being signed by the Albany Attack for the 2000 season.

On July 31, 2009, Sanderson was traded from the Buffalo Bandits to the Toronto Rock in exchange for Chris Driscoll.

== Statistics ==
=== NLL ===
Phil Sanderson		Regular season									Playoffs								
Season	Team	GP	G	A	Pts	LB	PIM	Pts/GP	LB/GP	PIM/GP	GP	G	A	Pts	LB	PIM	Pts/GP	LB/GP	PIM/GP
2000	Albany Attack	12	2	6	8	98	28	0.67	8.17	2.33	–	–	–	–	–	–	–	–	–
2001	Albany Attack	14	1	11	12	154	21	0.86	11.00	1.50	–	–	–	–	–	–	–	–	–
2002	Albany Attack	16	3	9	12	109	48	0.75	6.81	3.00	2	1	0	1	12	0	0.50	6.00	0.00
2003	Albany Attack	16	4	14	18	97	48	1.13	6.06	3.00	–	–	–	–	–	–	–	–	–
2004	San Jose Stealth	15	1	4	5	66	14	0.33	4.40	0.93	1	0	0	0	1	2	0.00	1.00	2.00
2005	Toronto Rock	16	3	10	13	113	25	0.81	7.06	1.56	2	1	0	1	21	2	0.50	10.50	1.00
2006	Toronto Rock	16	4	8	12	113	14	0.75	7.06	0.88	1	0	0	0	4	0	0.00	4.00	0.00
2007	Toronto Rock	9	3	3	6	75	6	0.67	8.33	0.67	–	–	–	–	–	–	–	–	–
2007	Buffalo Bandits	6	2	2	4	35	0	0.67	5.83	0.00	2	0	1	1	8	0	0.50	4.00	0.00
2008	Buffalo Bandits	16	0	7	7	92	20	0.44	5.75	1.25	3	0	1	1	19	4	0.33	6.33	1.33
2009	Buffalo Bandits	16	1	11	12	137	15	0.75	8.56	0.94	2	0	0	0	12	5	0.00	6.00	2.50
2010	Toronto Rock	16	0	5	5	80	21	0.31	5.00	1.31	1	0	0	0	4	0	0.00	4.00	0.00
2011	Toronto Rock	14	0	2	2	56	14	0.14	4.00	1.00	3	1	0	1	7	2	0.33	2.33	0.67
2012	Toronto Rock	10	1	3	4	41	12	0.40	4.10	1.20	–	–	–	–	–	–	–	–	–
		192	25	95	120	1,266	286	0.63	6.59	1.49	17	3	2	5	88	15	0.29	5.18	0.88
Career Total:		209	28	97	125	1,354	301	0.60	6.48	1.44									

GP–Games played; G–Goals; A–Assists; Pts–Points; LB–Loose balls; PIM–Penalty minutes; Pts/GP–Points per games played; LB/GP–Loose balls per games played; PIM/GP–Penalty minutes per games played.
