= Billy Dee Smith =

Canadian lacrosse player

Personal information
- Nationality: Canadian
- Born: June 30, 1982 (age 43) St. Catharines, Ontario
- Height: 6 ft 3 in (191 cm)
- Weight: 195 lb (88 kg; 13 st 13 lb)

Sport
- Position: Defense
- Shoots: Left
- NLL draft: 3rd overall, 2002; Buffalo Bandits
- NLL teams: Buffalo Bandits, Rochester Knighthawks
- MLL teams: Hamilton Nationals
- MSL team: Six Nations Chiefs
- Pro career: 2003–2019

Billy Dee Smith (born June 30, 1982 in St. Catharines, Ontario) is a former professional lacrosse player played for the Buffalo Bandits and Rochester Knighthawks of the National Lacrosse League and the Hamilton Nationals of Major League Lacrosse. He was also a member of the gold medal winning Canadian lacrosse team at the 2006 World Lacrosse Championship. Smith is an assistant coach for the Halifax Thunderbirds.

Smith was named Defensive Player of the Year for the 2009 NLL season. Injuries have limited his career.

In 2019, Smith was announced as part of Paul Rabil’s new Premier Lacrosse League as a member of Chaos Lacrosse Club.

== Statistics ==
=== NLL ===
		Regular Season						Playoffs
Season	Team	GP	G	A	Pts	LB	PIM	GP	G	A	Pts	LB	PIM
2003	Buffalo	7	2	1	3	24	46	--	--	--	--	--	--
2004	Buffalo	15	2	2	4	40	56	3	0	1	1	11	4
2005	Buffalo	16	3	1	4	37	60	1	0	0	0	1	4
2006	Buffalo	11	5	1	6	42	45	3	1	2	3	8	25
2007	Buffalo	14	0	8	8	40	29	2	0	0	0	6	2
2008	Buffalo	14	7	2	9	57	58	3	4	0	4	16	2
2009	Buffalo	13	5	7	12	47	33	2	0	1	1	8	4
2010	Buffalo	16	4	4	8	67	48	1	0	1	1	6	2
2011	Buffalo	--	--	--	--	--	--	--	--	--	--	--	--
2012	Buffalo	15	1	1	2	40	54	1	0	0	0	3	20
2013	Buffalo	12	2	1	3	22	37	--	--	--	--	--	--
2014	Buffalo	13	0	2	2	24	29	4	0	0	0	7	6
2015	Buffalo	17	1	4	5	32	53	1	0	0	0	3	0
2016	Buffalo	15	0	1	1	15	49	4	0	0	0	2	6
2017	Buffalo	14	0	0	0	25	37	--	--	--	--	--	--
2018	Rochester	14	0	0	0	22	35	4	0	0	0	5	8
2019	Rochester	2	0	0	0	0	16	--	--	--	--	--	--
NLL totals		208	32	35	67	534	685	29	5	5	10	76	80

== Awards ==
Preceded by Ryan Cousins	NLL Defensive Player of the Year; 2009	Succeeded by Sandy Chapman
