= Michael Peyser =

American lacrosse player

- Born: January 7, 1981 (age 44)
- Nationality: American
- Height: 6 ft 2 in (1.88 m)
- Weight: 227 pounds (103 kg)
- Position: Defense
- MLL team Former teams: New Jersey Pride; Boston Cannons
- NCAA team: Johns Hopkins University
- Pro career: 2003–

Michael Peyser (born January 7, 1981, in Lloyd Harbor, New York) is an American professional lacrosse player with the New Jersey Pride of Major League Lacrosse. He played collegiate lacrosse at Johns Hopkins University. He is a long-stick defenseman.

== Collegiate career ==
Peyser was a two-time USILA All-American while playing for the Johns Hopkins Blue Jays. In 2002, he was awarded an Honorable Mention All-American distinction. While in 2003, his senior season, he was awarded Second Team All-American honors. He was the leader of the Blue Jay defensive unit as a senior, and helped his team reach the 2003 NCAA Division I Men's Lacrosse Championship game where they were defeated by the University of Virginia.

== Professional career ==
Peyser began his professional career with the Boston Cannons in 2003. The Cannons drafted Peyser 11th overall in the second round of the 2003 MLL Collegiate Draft. In his first season, he appeared in twelve games. In 2004 he appeared in eleven games for the Cannons, before taking the next two seasons off.

Peyser has been a member of the New Jersey Pride since the 2007 season, when he was acquired from the league's "player pool" of free agents. He joined his brother Gregory on a team that already shared a number of brothers as teammates, including the Donegers and the Molletts. In 2008, Peyser scored his first career goal. During the 2008 MLL Collegiate Draft, the Pride selected Peyser's younger brother Stephen. During Week 6 of the 2008 MLL season, the Peyser brothers (Michael, Gregory, and Stephen) became the first trio of brothers to play on the same Major League Lacrosse team together.

== Statistics ==
=== MLL ===
		Regular Season							Playoffs
Season	Team	GP	G	2ptG	A	Pts	LB	PIM	GP	G	2ptG	A	Pts	LB	PIM
2003	Boston	12	0	0	0	0	0	3	0	0	0	0	0	0	0
2004	Boston	12	0	0	0	0	0	6	0	0	0	0	0	0	0
2007	New Jersey	10	0	0	0	0	0	2	0	0	0	0	0	0	0
2008	New Jersey	7	1	0	0	1	0	4	0	0	0	0	0	0	0
MLL Totals		41	1	0	0	1	0	15	0	0	0	0	0	0	0
