= Josh Sanderson =

Canadian lacrosse player (born 1977)

Personal information
- Nickname: Shooter
- Born: April 23, 1977 (age 49) Orangeville, Ontario, Canada
- Height: 5 ft 7 in (170 cm)
- Weight: 150 lb (68 kg; 10 st 10 lb)

Sport
- Position: Forward
- Shoots: Left
- NLL draft: 16th overall, 1997; Rochester Knighthawks
- NLL teams: Toronto Rock; Boston Blazers; Calgary Roughnecks; San Jose Stealth; Albany Attack; Rochester Knighthawks
- Pro career: 1998–2016

Josh "Shooter" Sanderson (born April 23, 1977 in Orangeville, Ontario) is a Canadian former professional box lacrosse player. Sanderson played 19 seasons in the National Lacrosse League including nine with the Toronto Rock.

In 2002, as a member of the Brampton Excelsiors, Sanderson was awarded the Mike Kelly Memorial Trophy as most valuable player in the Mann Cup competition.

== Professional career ==
Sanderson began his NLL career with the Rochester Knighthawks. After two seasons in Rochester, Sanderson was left unprotected in the expansion draft, and was chosen by his father, Albany Attack GM Terry Sanderson. Josh went on to be the leading scorer on the Attack for four years, including setting a new NLL record for assists in a season, with 68 in 2002.

After the 2003 NLL season, the Attack moved to San Jose, California, becoming the San Jose Stealth. After one year in San Jose, now-Toronto Rock GM Terry Sanderson once again acquired his son, as Josh was traded to the Rock in a 6-player blockbuster deal. In 2005, Sanderson broke his own single-season assists record with 71, and helped the Rock win their fifth NLL Championship.

During the 2008 season, Sanderson was traded to the Calgary Roughnecks for Lewis Ratcliff. Calgary became the third team (after Albany and Toronto) where Sanderson played for his father, who was an assistant coach for the Roughnecks until the end of the 2009 NLL season.

In 2009, Sanderson broke his own record once again, as he and Dan Dawson both finished the season with 74 assists.

Sanderson was named to the NLL All-Pro teams in 2000, 2002, 2003, 2004, 2005, and 2006. During the 2009 NLL season, he was named a starter to the All-Star Game.

On August 13, 2010, Sanderson was traded to the Boston Blazers along with a 1st-round draft pick in the 2010 entry draft in exchange for Daryl Veltman, Jon Harnett and transition player Kyle Ross as well as the Blazers' first round selection in the 2010 Entry Draft.

He was selected with the 4th pick in the Boston Blazers Dispersal Draft by the Minnesota Swarm. He was then traded from the Minnesota Swarm to the Toronto Rock, along with Nick Inch in exchange for 9th pick in the Boston Blazers dispersal draft, 12th pick in the 2011 NLL Entry Draft and a conditional first-round pick in the 2012 NLL entry draft.

After contemplating retirement before the 2016 season, Sanderson decided to return for one more season, picking up 42 points in 11 games. Sanderson announced his retirement shortly after the conclusion of the 2016 season. He was subsequently named assistant General Manager of the Rock. On August 8, 2023, he was named Head Coach and Assistant General Manager of the Calgary Roughnecks.

== Statistics ==
=== NLL ===
Josh Sanderson		Regular season									Playoffs								
Season	Team	GP	G	A	Pts	LB	PIM	Pts/GP	LB/GP	PIM/GP	GP	G	A	Pts	LB	PIM	Pts/GP	LB/GP	PIM/GP
1998	Rochester Knighthawks	4	1	3	4	10	6	1.00	2.50	1.50	–	–	–	–	–	–	–	–	–
1999	Rochester Knighthawks	5	6	6	12	17	2	2.40	3.40	0.40	–	–	–	–	–	–	–	–	–
2000	Albany Attack	11	30	34	64	61	6	5.82	5.55	0.55	–	–	–	–	–	–	–	–	–
2001	Albany Attack	14	18	32	50	68	18	3.57	4.86	1.29	–	–	–	–	–	–	–	–	–
2002	Albany Attack	16	35	68	103	62	12	6.44	3.88	0.75	2	7	10	17	14	2	8.50	7.00	1.00
2003	Albany Attack	15	25	51	76	61	7	5.07	4.07	0.47	–	–	–	–	–	–	–	–	–
2004	San Jose Stealth	16	28	61	89	60	10	5.56	3.75	0.63	1	2	2	4	3	2	4.00	3.00	2.00
2005	Toronto Rock	16	31	71	102	112	8	6.38	7.00	0.50	2	5	6	11	14	0	5.50	7.00	0.00
2006	Toronto Rock	16	29	69	98	92	6	6.13	5.75	0.38	1	2	2	4	1	0	4.00	1.00	0.00
2007	Toronto Rock	16	31	54	85	78	10	5.31	4.88	0.63	1	0	0	0	7	0	0.00	7.00	0.00
2008	Toronto Rock	11	23	27	50	61	6	4.55	5.55	0.55	–	–	–	–	–	–	–	–	–
2008	Calgary Roughnecks	4	6	8	14	19	0	3.50	4.75	0.00	2	2	8	10	10	2	5.00	5.00	1.00
2009	Calgary Roughnecks	16	29	74	103	73	4	6.44	4.56	0.25	3	5	14	19	14	0	6.33	4.67	0.00
2010	Calgary Roughnecks	16	34	70	104	67	2	6.50	4.19	0.13	1	0	3	3	3	0	3.00	3.00	0.00
2011	Boston Blazers	16	20	43	63	52	4	3.94	3.25	0.25	1	0	2	2	2	0	2.00	2.00	0.00
2012	Toronto Rock	14	22	42	64	50	2	4.57	3.57	0.14	2	5	2	7	13	0	3.50	6.50	0.00
2013	Toronto Rock	16	29	33	62	68	4	3.88	4.25	0.25	1	0	1	1	1	0	1.00	1.00	0.00
2014	Toronto Rock	17	22	48	70	77	6	4.12	4.53	0.35	1	2	4	6	7	0	6.00	7.00	0.00
2015	Toronto Rock	18	19	83	102	90	10	5.67	5.00	0.56	4	3	10	13	19	8	3.25	4.75	2.00
2016	Toronto Rock	11	11	31	42	38	8	3.82	3.45	0.73	–	–	–	–	–	–	–	–	–
		268	449	908	1,357	1,216	131	5.06	4.54	0.49	22	33	64	97	108	14	4.41	4.91	0.64
Career Total:		290	482	972	1,454	1,324	145	5.01	4.57	0.50									

GP–Games played; G–Goals; A–Assists; Pts–Points; LB–Loose balls; PIM–Penalty minutes; Pts/GP–Points per games played; LB/GP–Loose balls per games played; PIM/GP–Penalty minutes per games played.

=== NLL head coaching statistics ===
Team	Season	Regular Season				Playoffs				Playoff result
Team	Season	GC	W	L	W%	GC	W	L	W%	Playoff result
Calgary Roughnecks	2024	18	8	10	.444	–	–	–	–	Did not qualify
Calgary Roughnecks	2025	18	10	8	.556	1	0	1	.000	Lost NLL Quarterfinals (HFX)
Calgary Roughnecks	2026	18	6	12	.333	–	–	–	–	Did not qualify
Totals:	3	54	24	30	.444	1	0	1	.000	

Preceded by Mark Steenhuis	Champion's Cup MVP; 2009	Succeeded by Lewis Ratcliff
