= St. Regis Indians =

St. Regis Indians
City	St. Regis, NY
League	Major Series Lacrosse
Founded	1998
Home Arena	A`nowara`ko:wa Arena
Colours	Black & Silver
Coach
GM

The St. Regis Indians were a Senior "A" box lacrosse team from St. Regis Mohawk Reservation, New York on Akwesasne Island. The Indians played in the Major Series Lacrosse Senior "A" Lacrosse League from 1998 to 2009.

== History ==
Until 1998 the team was known as the Akwesasne Thunder. The Thunder played at the Senior B level and were 2-time Presidents Cup (box lacrosse) national champions (1995 and 1997). The Thunder won league championships four consecutive times (1994-97) before the move to Senior A.

The Indians played in the 1999 Major Series Lacrosse championship series, losing to the Brampton Excelsiors in five games.

The club folded after a story-filled 2009 season.
