= National Lacrosse League All-Star Game =

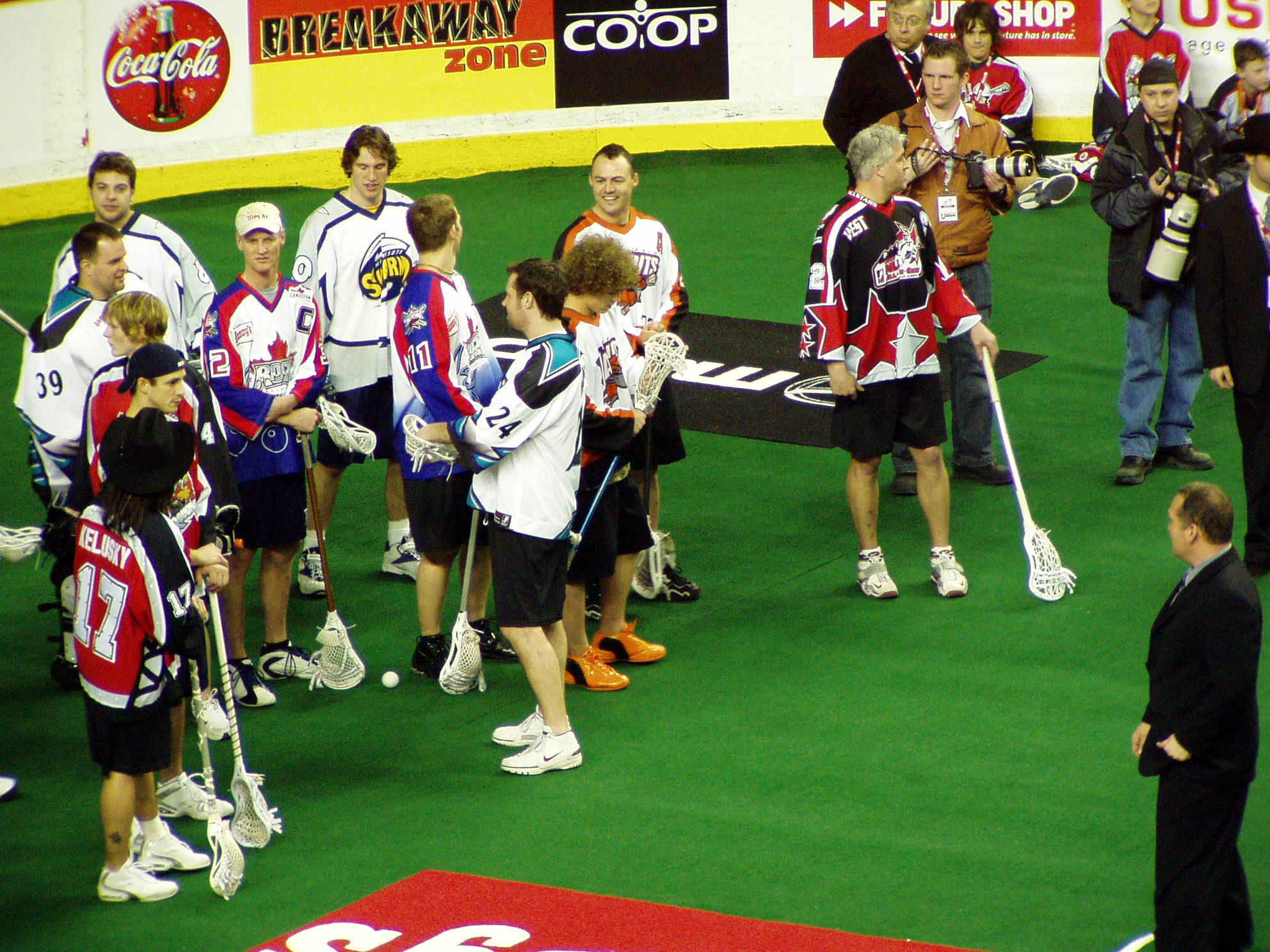
All Stars during the skills competition, 2005, Calgary

The National Lacrosse League All Star Game was a box lacrosse game played between two teams representing the two divisions of the National Lacrosse League (NLL). The last game took place during the 2012 season.

== 1990s ==
=== 1991 (Major Indoor Lacrosse League) ===
The National Division (Detroit Turbos, New England Blazers, Pittsburgh Bulls) defeated the American Division (Baltimore Thunder, New York Saints, Philadelphia Wings), by a score of 25-20, at the Spectrum in Philadelphia, Pennsylvania.

=== 1999 ===
Team Canada defeated Team USA, by a score of 25-24 in overtime at the Blue Cross Arena, in Rochester, New York. The All-Stars were placed into their respective teams by their nationality.

== 2000s ==
=== 2002 ===
On Sunday, April 21, 2002, eight days after the 2001–2002 NLL Championship Game, the North (Calgary Roughnecks, Montreal Express, Ottawa Rebel, Rochester Knighthawks, Toronto Rock, Vancouver Ravens) defeated the South (Albany Attack, Buffalo Bandits, Columbus Landsharks, New Jersey Storm, New York Saints, Philadelphia Wings, Washington Power) by a score of 14-10 at the Mohegan Sun Arena in Uncasville, Connecticut.

=== 2004 ===
The Eastern Division All-Stars won 19-15 over the Western Division All-Stars at the Pepsi Center in Denver, Colorado. The Most Valuable Player of the game was Mark Steenhuis.

=== 2005 ===
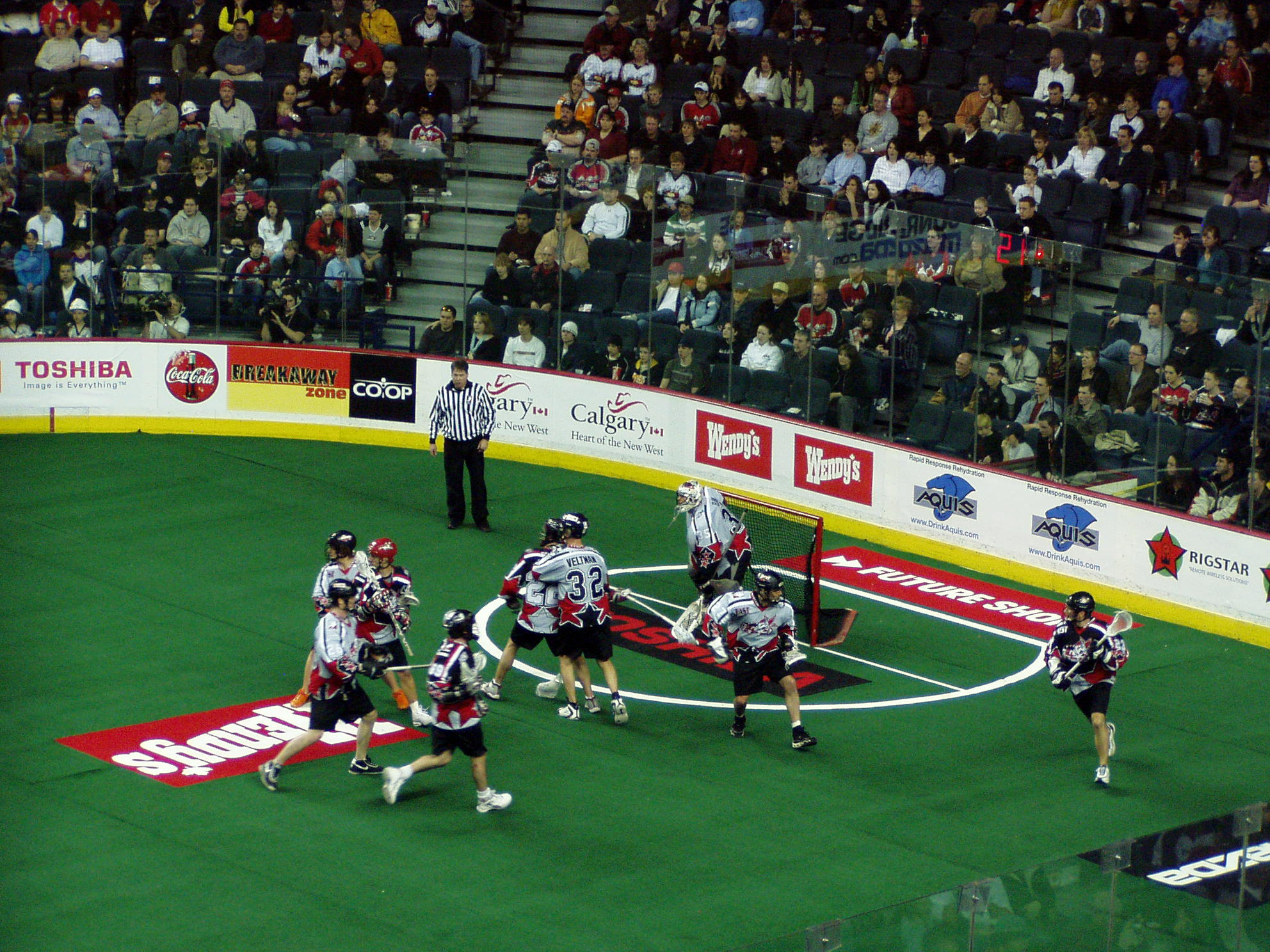
Action during 2005 All Star Game

The 2005 NLL All Star Game was played on February 26, 2005, in the Pengrowth Saddledome, the home of the Calgary Roughnecks. For the first time ever, the game was on US national broadcast TV – on NBC. The NLL moved the date of the game from February 27 to February 26 to accommodate NBC's schedule. The East Division defeated the West in overtime 11-10 in front of 11,569 fans at Pengrowth Saddledome. John Tavares of Buffalo scored the winning goal. Tracey Kelusky of Calgary was named Most Valuable Player of the game. After the game, there was a youth USA vs. Canada lacrosse game and an NLL All-Star skills competition.

Box Score

=== 2006 ===
The 2006 NLL All Star Game was played in Toronto on February 25, 2006. The West Division won 14-13 with a crowd of 15,924 fans at Air Canada Centre.

Lewis Ratcliff, a forward for the Calgary Roughnecks, was the MVP of the game. He scored 4 goals, one of which was the game winner with only 4.4 seconds left in the game.

Box Score

=== 2007 ===
The 2007 NLL All Star Game was played in Portland, Oregon, at the Rose Garden Arena on March 10, 2007. The East beat the West 20-16. Mark Steenhuis of the Buffalo Bandits was named game MVP with six goals, marking the first time an NLL player has been named All-Star Game MVP twice. Steenhuis also won the award in 2004.

Box Score

=== 2008 ===
The 2008 All-Star Game was held at Rexall Place in Edmonton on March 16, 2008. The East division All-Stars defeated the West division 17-16 in overtime, as Shawn Williams scored the winner 31 seconds into OT. Philadelphia Wings' transition player Geoff Snider was named MVP.

Box Score

=== 2009 ===
The 2009 NLL All-Star Game was held at the Pepsi Center in Denver, Colorado, on March 7, 2009. The East defeated the west 27-21. Once again, Mark Steenhuis was named game MVP with seven goals and six assists. Steenhuis was also All-Star Game MVP in 2004 and 2007.

Box Score

== 2010s ==
=== 2011 ===
The 2011 NLL All-Star Game returned after a one-year hiatus, and was played at the Turning Stone Casino Arena in Verona, New York, on February 27, 2011. The East Division All-Stars beat West Division All-Stars 30-26. Rochester forward Shawn Evans was named MVP.

=== 2012 ===
It was announced on September 26, 2011, that the 2012 NLL All-Star Game will be held at the First Niagara Center in Buffalo on February 25, 2012. The West Division All-Stars beat East Division All-Stars 20-18. Calgary Transition Player Geoff Snider was named MVP.

=== 2013 to present ===
No All-Star game has been held since the 2012 season.

== Game log ==
#	Date	Winner	Score	Loser	Score	OT	Attendance	Arena	Location	MVP
1	February 24, 1991	National Division	25	American Division	20	-	7,658	Spectrum	Philadelphia, PA	-
2	February 28, 1999	Canada All-Stars	25	USA All-Stars	24	OT	9,070	Blue Cross Arena	Rochester, NY	-
3	April 21, 2002	North Division	14	South Division	10	-	-	Mohegan Sun Arena	Uncasville, CT	Steve Toll
4	February 22, 2004	East Division	19	West Division	15	-	16,742	Pepsi Center	Denver, CO	Mark Steenhuis
5	February 16, 2005	East Division	11	West Division	10	OT	11,569	Pengrowth Saddledome	Calgary, AB	Tracey Kelusky
6	February 25, 2006	West Division	14	East Division	13	-	15,924	Air Canada Centre	Toronto, ON	Lewis Ratcliff
7	March 10, 2007	East Division	20	West Division	16	-	12,856	Rose Garden Arena	Portland, OR	Mark Steenhuis
8	March 16, 2008	East Division	17	West Division	16	OT	9,750	Rexall Place	Edmonton, AB	Geoff Snider
9	March 7, 2009	East Division	27	West Division	21	-	13,380	Pepsi Center	Denver, CO	Mark Steenhuis
10	February 27, 2011	East Division	30	West Division	26	-	-	Turning Stone Casino Arena	Verona, NY	Shawn Evans
11	February 25, 2012	West Division	20	East Division	18	-	13,466	First Niagara Center	Buffalo, NY	Geoff Snider
