= List of NLL seasons =

This is a list of seasons of the National Lacrosse League (NLL), a professional box lacrosse league, since its inception in 1987. The list also includes the seasons of Eagle Pro Box Lacrosse League and the Major Indoor Lacrosse League, the predecessor leagues of the NLL, which had teams continue play in the NLL.

== 1987–88: Eagle Pro Box Lacrosse ==
No.	Season	No. of teams	Reg. season games	Start (reg. season)	Finish (incl. playoffs)	Top record	Champion
1	1987	4	6	January 10	March 21	New Jersey Saints (5–1)	Philadelphia Wings
2	1988	4	8	January 3	March 20	Washington Wave (6–2)	New Jersey Saints

== 1989–97: Major Indoor Lacrosse League ==
No.	Season	No. of teams	Reg. season games	Start (reg. season)	Finish (incl. playoffs)	Top record	Champion
3	1989	6^{[1]}	8	January 7	April 7	Philadelphia Wings (6–2)	Philadelphia Wings
4	1990	6^{[2]}	8	January 5	April 13	New England Blazers (6–2)	Philadelphia Wings
5	1991	6	10	December 29, 1990	April 6	Detroit Turbos (8–2)	Detroit Turbos
6	1992	7^{[3]}	8	December 27, 1991	April 11	Detroit Turbos (6–2)	Buffalo Bandits
7	1993	7	8	January 9	April 10	Buffalo Bandits (8–0)	Buffalo Bandits
8	1994	6^{[4]}	8	January 8	April 16	Buffalo Bandits (6–2)	Philadelphia Wings
9	1995	6^{[5]}	8	January 7	April 8	Philadelphia Wings (7–1)	Philadelphia Wings
10	1996	7^{[6]}	10	December 30, 1995	April 12	Buffalo Bandits (8–2)	Buffalo Bandits
11	1997	6^{[7]}	10	January 4	April 12	Philadelphia Wings (7–3)	Rochester Knighthawks

Notes

1. The Detroit Turbos and New England Blazers started play. The New Jersey Saints relocated to Long Island, New York, renamed the New York Saints.
2. The Pittsburgh Bulls started play. The Washington Wave dissolved.
3. The Buffalo Bandits started play. The New England Blazers relocated to Boston, Massachusetts, renamed the Boston Blazers.
4. The Pittsburgh Bulls were dissolved.
5. The Rochester Knighthawks started play. The Detroit Turbos were dissolved.
6. The Charlotte Cobras started play.
7. The Charlotte Cobras dissolved.

== 1998–present: National Lacrosse League ==
No.	Season	No. of teams	Reg. season games	Start (reg. season)	Finish (incl. playoffs)	Top record	Champion
12	1998	7^{[8]}	12	January 3	April 28	Philadelphia Wings (9–3)	Philadelphia Wings
13	1999	7^{[9]}	12	December 26, 1998	April 23	Toronto Rock (9–3)	Toronto Rock
14	2000	8^{[10]}	12	January 7	May 6	Toronto Rock (9–3)	Toronto Rock
15	2001	9^{[11]}	14	December 21, 2000	April 27	Toronto Rock (11–3)	Philadelphia Wings
16	2002	13^{[12]}	16	November 16, 2001	April 13	Albany Attack (14–2)	Toronto Rock
17	2003	12^{[13]}	16	December 27, 2002	May 3	Rochester Knighthawks (12–4)	Toronto Rock
18	2004	10^{[14]}	16	December 26, 2003	May 7	Colorado Mammoth (13–3)	Calgary Roughnecks
19	2005	10^{[15]}	16	January 1	May 14	Toronto Rock (12–4)	Toronto Rock
20	2006	11^{[16]}	16	December 30, 2005	May 13	Buffalo Bandits (11–5)	Colorado Mammoth
21	2007	13^{[17]}	16	December 30, 2006	May 12	Rochester Knighthawks (14–2)	Rochester Knighthawks
22	2008	12^{[18]}	16	December 29, 2007	May 17	Buffalo Bandits (10–6)	Buffalo Bandits
23	2009	12^{[19]}	16	January 3	May 15	Calgary Roughnecks (12–4)	Calgary Roughnecks
24	2010	11^{[20]}	16	January 8	May 15	Washington Stealth (11–5)	Washington Stealth
25	2011	10^{[21]}	16	January 8	May 14	Calgary Roughnecks (11–5)	Toronto Rock
26	2012	9^{[22]}	16	January 8	May 19	Calgary Roughnecks (12–4)	Rochester Knighthawks
27	2013	9	16	January 4	May 11	Toronto Rock (10–6)	Rochester Knighthawks
28	2014	9^{[23]}	18	December 28, 2013	May 31	Edmonton Rush (16–2)	Rochester Knighthawks
29	2015	9^{[24]}	18	January 2	June 5	Toronto Rock (14–4)	Edmonton Rush
30	2016	9^{[25]}	18	January 1	June 4	Buffalo Bandits (13–5)	Saskatchewan Rush
31	2017	9	18	December 29, 2016	June 10	Georgia Swarm (13–5)	Georgia Swarm
32	2018	9	18	December 8, 2017	June 9	Saskatchewan Rush (14–4)	Saskatchewan Rush
33	2019	11^{[26]}	18	December 15, 2018	May 25	Buffalo Bandits (14–4)	Calgary Roughnecks
34	2020	13^{[27]}	18	November 29, 2019	March 12	New England Black Wolves (8–3)	Not awarded due to the COVID-19 pandemic
–	2021	Season not played due to COVID-19 pandemic					
35	2022	14^{[28]}	18	December 3, 2021	June 18	Buffalo Bandits (14–4)	Colorado Mammoth
36	2023	15^{[29]}	18	December 2, 2022	June 3	Buffalo Bandits (14–4)	Buffalo Bandits
37	2024	15	18	December 1, 2023	May 18	Toronto Rock (15–3)	Buffalo Bandits
38	2025	14^{[30]}	18	November 29, 2024	May 24	Buffalo Bandits (13–5)	Buffalo Bandits
39	2026	14^{[31]}	18	November 28, 2025	May 17	Vancouver Warriors (13–5)	Toronto Rock

Notes

8. The Boston Blazers were dissolved. The Ontario Raiders and Syracuse Smash started play.
9. The Ontario Raiders relocated to Toronto, Ontario, renamed the Toronto Rock.
10. The Albany Attack started play. The Baltimore Thunder relocated to Pittsburgh, Pennsylvania, renamed the Pittsburgh CrosseFire.
11. The Columbus Landsharks began play. The Pittsburgh CrosseFire relocated to Washington, D.C., renamed the Washington Power. The Syracuse Smash relocated to Ottawa, Ontario, renamed the Ottawa Rebel.
12. The Calgary Roughnecks, Montreal Express, New Jersey Storm, and Vancouver Ravens started play.
13. The Montreal Express dissolved. The Washington Power relocated to Denver, Colorado, renamed the Colorado Mammoth.
14. The Ottawa Rebel and New York Saints dissolved. The Albany Attack relocated to San Jose, California, renamed the San Jose Stealth. The Columbus Landsharks relocated to Glendale, Arizona, renamed the Arizona Sting. The New Jersey Storm relocated to Anaheim, California, renamed the Anaheim Storm.
15. The Minnesota Swarm started play. The Vancouver Ravens dissolved.
16. The Edmonton Rush and the Portland LumberJax started play. The Anaheim Storm dissolved.
17. The Chicago Shamrox and the New York Titans started play.
18. The Arizona Sting dissolved.
19. The Boston Blazers started play.
20. The Portland LumberJax dissolved. The New York Titans relocated to Orlando, Florida, renamed the Orlando Titans. The San Jose Stealth relocated to Everett, Washington, renamed the Washington Stealth.
21. The Orlando Titans dissolved.
22. The Boston Blazers dissolved.
23. The Washington Stealth relocated to Langley, British Columbia, renamed the Vancouver Stealth.
24. The Philadelphia Wings relocated to Uncasville, Connecticut, renamed the New England Black Wolves.
25. The Edmonton Rush relocated to Saskatoon, Saskatchewan, renamed the Saskatchewan Rush. The Minnesota Swarm relocated to Duluth, Georgia, renamed the Georgia Swarm.
26. The Philadelphia Wings and the San Diego Seals started play.
27. The New York Riptide and the Rochester Knighthawks started play. The original Rochester Knighthawks franchise relocated to Halifax, Nova Scotia, renamed the Halifax Thunderbirds.
28. The Panther City Lacrosse Club started play. The New England Black Wolves relocated to Albany, New York, renamed the Albany FireWolves.
29. The Las Vegas Desert Dogs started play.
30. The New York Riptide relocated to Ottawa, Ontario, renamed the Ottawa Black Bears. The Panther City Lacrosse Club dissolved.
31. The Albany FireWolves relocated to Oshawa, Ontario, renamed the Oshawa FireWolves.
