= List of defunct NLL teams =

This is a list of teams that once played in the National Lacrosse League but no longer exist or have suspended operations for various reasons. This includes franchises which have relocated to different cities.

Team	Seasons	Overall record	Relocated to
Albany Attack	2000–2003	33–25	San Jose Stealth
Albany FireWolves	2022–2025	30–42	Oshawa FireWolves
Anaheim Storm	2004–2005	6–26	
Arizona Sting	2004–2007	33–31	
Baltimore Thunder	1987–1999	49–67	Pittsburgh CrosseFire
Boston Blazers	1992–1997	24–28	
Boston Blazers	2009–2011	26–22	
Charlotte Cobras	1996	0–10	
Chicago Shamrox	2007–2008	12–20	
Columbus Landsharks	2001–2003	16–30	Arizona Sting
Detroit Turbos	1989–1994	29–21	
Edmonton Rush	2006–2015	75–89	Saskatchewan Rush
Minnesota Swarm	2004–2015	76–104	Georgia Swarm
Montreal Express	2002	8–8	Minnesota Swarm
New England Blazers	1989–1991	10–16	Boston Blazers
New England Black Wolves	2015–2021	48–53	Albany FireWolves
New Jersey Saints	1987–1988	10–4	New York Saints
New Jersey Storm	2002–2003	4–12	Anaheim Storm
New York Saints	1989–2003	75–95	
New York Riptide	2018–2024	20–47	Ottawa Black Bears
New York Titans	2007–2009	24–24	Orlando Titans
Ontario Raiders	1998	6–6	Toronto Rock
Orlando Titans	2010	11–5	
Ottawa Black Bears	2024–2026	16–20	
Ottawa Rebel	2001–2003	9–37	
Philadelphia Wings	1986–2014; 2019–2026	187–181	New England Black Wolves (first incarnation)
Panther City Lacrosse Club	2021–2024	26–28	
Pittsburgh Bulls	1990–1993	10–24	
Pittsburgh CrosseFire	2000	6–6	Washington Power
Portland LumberJax	2006–2009	30–34	
San Jose Stealth	2004–2009	38–42	Washington Stealth
Syracuse Smash	1998–2000	6–30	Ottawa Rebel
Vancouver Ravens	2002–2004	24–24	
Washington Power	2001–2002	18–12	Colorado Mammoth
Washington Stealth	2009–2013	32–32	Vancouver Stealth (Now Warriors)
Washington Wave	1987–1989	9–13	
