= 1992 Major Indoor Lacrosse League season =

1992 MILL season
- League: Major Indoor Lacrosse League
- Sport: Indoor lacrosse
- Duration: December 27, 1991 - April 11, 1992
- Games: 8
- Teams: 7
- TV partner: Prime Network

Draft
- Top draft pick: Darris Kilgour
- Picked by: Buffalo Bandits

Regular season
- Season MVP: John Tavares (Buffalo Bandits)
- Top scorer: Paul Gait (Detroit Turbos)

Playoffs
- Finals champions: Buffalo Bandits (1st title)
- Runners-up: Philadelphia Wings
- Finals MVP: John Tavares (Buffalo)

MILL seasons
- ← 1991 season 1993 season →

The 1992 season is the 6th season of the league that began on December 27, 1991, and concluded with the championship game on April 11, 1992.

== Team movement ==
1992 saw the debut of the Buffalo Bandits, and also saw the New England Blazers move to Boston.

=== Teams ===
1992 Major Indoor Lacrosse League
Division	Team	City	Arena	Capacity
American	Baltimore Thunder	Baltimore, Maryland	Baltimore Arena	10,582
American	New York Saints	Uniondale, New York	Nassau Veterans Memorial Coliseum	16,297
American	Philadelphia Wings	Philadelphia, Pennsylvania	Spectrum	17,382
National	Boston Blazers	Boston, Massachusetts	Boston Garden	14,448
National	Buffalo Bandits	Buffalo, New York	Buffalo Memorial Auditorium	16,325
National	Detroit Turbos	Detroit, Michigan	Joe Louis Arena	19,875
National	Pittsburgh Bulls	Pittsburgh, Pennsylvania	Civic Arena	16,164

=== Map of teams ===
American Division National Division

== Regular season ==
National Division
P	Team	GP	W	L	PCT	GB	Home	Road	GF	GA	Diff	GF/GP	GA/GP
1	Detroit Turbos – xyz	8	6	2	.750	0.0	2–2	4–0	140	104	+36	17.50	13.00
2	Buffalo Bandits – x	8	5	3	.625	1.0	2–2	3–1	161	125	+36	20.12	15.62
3	Boston Blazers – x	8	3	5	.375	3.0	2–2	1–3	101	116	−15	12.62	14.50
4	Pittsburgh Bulls	8	3	5	.375	3.0	2–2	1–3	99	121	−22	12.38	15.12

American Division
P	Team	GP	W	L	PCT	GB	Home	Road	GF	GA	Diff	GF/GP	GA/GP
1	New York Saints – xy	8	5	3	.625	0.0	3–1	2–2	0	0	−-0	0.00	0.00
2	Philadelphia Wings – x	8	3	5	.375	2.0	1–3	2–2	0	0	−-0	0.00	0.00
3	Baltimore Thunder – x	8	3	5	.375	2.0	2–2	1–3	0	0	−-0	0.00	0.00

x: Clinched playoff berth; c: Clinched playoff berth by crossing over to another division; y: Clinched division; z: Clinched best regular season record; GP: Games Played
W: Wins; L: Losses; GB: Games back; PCT: Win percentage; Home: Record at Home; Road: Record on the Road; GF: Goals scored; GA: Goals allowed
Differential: Difference between goals scored and allowed; GF/GP: Average number of goals scored per game; GA/GP: Average number of goals allowed per game

== All Star Game ==
No All-Star Game was played in 1992.

== Playoffs ==
Divisional Semifinals
National Division
3	Boston	16
2	Buffalo	22
American Division
3	Baltimore	12
2	Philadelphia	14

Divisional Finals
2	Buffalo	19
1	Detroit	16
2	Philadelphia	8
1	New York	6

Championship
N2	Buffalo	11*
A2	Philadelphia	10

- * indicates an overtime period

== Awards ==
Award	Winner	Team
Rookie of the Year Award	Derek Keenan	Buffalo
Championship Game MVP	John Tavares	Buffalo

=== All-Pro Teams ===
First Team:

- Gary Gait, Detroit
- Paul Gait, Detroit
- Dave Pietramala, Pittsburgh
- Rick Sowell, Baltimore
- John Tucker, Philadelphia
- Sal LoCascio, New York (goalie)

Second Team:

- Jeff Jackson, Baltimore
- Derek Keenan, Buffalo
- Darris Kilgour, Buffalo
- John Nostrant, Philadelphia
- Jim Veltman, Buffalo
- Dallas Eliuk, Philadelphia (goalie)

== Statistics leaders ==
Bold numbers indicate new single-season records. Italics indicate tied single-season records.

Stat	Player	Team	Number
Goals	Paul Gait	Detroit	33
Assists	Derek Keenan	Buffalo	23
	Jim Veltman	Buffalo	23
Points	Paul Gait	Detroit	53
Penalty Minutes	Darris Kilgour	Buffalo	**49**
Shots on Goal	Paul Gait	Detroit	**85**
	Jeff Jackson	Baltimore	**85**
Loose Balls	Jim Veltman	Buffalo	**111**

== Attendance ==
=== Regular season ===
Home team	Home games	Average attendance	Total attendance
Philadelphia Wings	4	14,860	59,440
Buffalo Bandits	4	13,821	55,283
New York Saints	4	11,562	46,247
Baltimore Thunder	4	9,313	37,252
Detroit Turbos	4	8,356	33,425
Pittsburgh Bulls	4	7,925	31,701
Boston Blazers	4	6,859	27,435
**League**	**28**	**10,385**	**290,783**

=== Playoffs ===
Home team	Home games	Average attendance	Total attendance
Buffalo Bandits	1	15,603	15,603
Philadelphia Wings	2	11,686	23,372
New York Saints	1	9,678	9,678
Detroit Turbos	1	4,136	4,136
**League**	**5**	**10,558**	**52,789**

== See also ==
- 1992 in sports
