= 1993 Major Indoor Lacrosse League season =

1993 MILL season
- League: Major Indoor Lacrosse League
- Sport: Indoor lacrosse
- Duration: January 9, 1993 - April 10, 1993
- Games: 8
- Teams: 7
- TV partner: Prime Network

Draft
- Top draft pick: Jim Buczek
- Picked by: Pittsburgh Bulls

Regular season
- Season MVP: John Tavares (Buffalo Bandits)
- Top scorer: John Tavares (Buffalo Bandits)

Playoffs
- Finals champions: Buffalo Bandits (2nd title)
- Runners-up: Philadelphia Wings
- Finals MVP: John Tavares (Buffalo)

MILL seasons
- ← 1992 season 1994 season →

The 1993 Major Indoor Lacrosse League season is the 7th season of the league that began on January 9, 1993, and concluded with the championship game on April 10. 1993 saw the only undefeated season in the history of the MILL/NLL; the Buffalo Bandits won all eight of their regular season games, then defeated Boston in the Divisional finals and Philadelphia in the Championship game to finish with a perfect 10–0 record.

== Team movement ==
1993 saw no team changes from the 1992 season. The next season to see no team changes from the previous season did not occur until 2013.

=== Teams ===
1993 Major Indoor Lacrosse League
Division	Team	City	Arena	Capacity
American	Baltimore Thunder	Baltimore, Maryland	Baltimore Arena	10,582
American	New York Saints	Uniondale, New York	Nassau Veterans Memorial Coliseum	16,297
American	Philadelphia Wings	Philadelphia, Pennsylvania	Spectrum	17,382
National	Boston Blazers	Boston, Massachusetts	Boston Garden	14,448
National	Buffalo Bandits	Buffalo, New York	Buffalo Memorial Auditorium	16,325
National	Detroit Turbos	Detroit, Michigan	Joe Louis Arena	19,875
National	Pittsburgh Bulls	Pittsburgh, Pennsylvania	Civic Arena	16,164

=== Map of teams ===
American Division National Division

== Regular season ==
National Division
P	Team	GP	W	L	PCT	GB	Home	Road	GF	GA	Diff	GF/GP	GA/GP
1	Buffalo Bandits – xyz	8	8	0	1.000	0.0	4–0	4–0	143	108	+35	17.88	13.50
2	Detroit Turbos – x	8	3	5	.375	5.0	2–2	1–3	108	122	−14	13.50	15.25
3	Boston Blazers – x	8	2	6	.250	6.0	2–2	0–4	93	103	−10	11.62	12.88
4	Pittsburgh Bulls	8	1	7	.125	7.0	0–4	1–3	97	107	−10	12.12	13.38

American Division
P	Team	GP	W	L	PCT	GB	Home	Road	GF	GA	Diff	GF/GP	GA/GP
1	Philadelphia Wings – xy	8	7	1	.875	0.0	4–0	3–1	121	96	+25	15.12	12.00
2	New York Saints – x	8	5	3	.625	2.0	3–1	2–2	88	89	−1	11.00	11.12
3	Baltimore Thunder – x	8	2	6	.250	5.0	1–3	1–3	122	147	−25	15.25	18.38

x: Clinched playoff berth; c: Clinched playoff berth by crossing over to another division; y: Clinched division; z: Clinched best regular season record; GP: Games Played
W: Wins; L: Losses; GB: Games back; PCT: Win percentage; Home: Record at Home; Road: Record on the Road; GF: Goals scored; GA: Goals allowed
Differential: Difference between goals scored and allowed; GF/GP: Average number of goals scored per game; GA/GP: Average number of goals allowed per game

== All Star Game ==
No All-Star Game was played in 1993.

== Playoffs ==
Divisional Semifinals
National Division
3	Detroit	5
2	Boston	18
American Division
3	Baltimore	9
2	New York	10

Divisional Finals
2	Boston	10
1	Buffalo	12
2	New York	9
1	Philadelphia	17

Championship
N1	Buffalo	13
A1	Philadelphia	12

- Buffalo hosted the championship game.

== Awards ==
Award	Winner	Team
Championship Game MVP	John Tavares	Buffalo

=== All-Pro Teams ===
First Team:

- Gary Gait, Philadelphia
- Paul Gait, Philadelphia
- Dave Pietramala, Pittsburgh
- John Tavares, Buffalo
- Jim Veltman, Buffalo
- Dallas Eliuk, Philadelphia (goalie)

Second Team:

- Thomas Carmean, Boston
- Jeff Jackson, Baltimore
- Derek Keenan, Buffalo
- Rob Shek, Philadelphia
- John Tucker, Baltimore
- Sal LoCascio, New York (goalie)

== Statistics leaders ==
Bold numbers indicate new single-season records. Italics indicate tied single-season records.

Stat	Player	Team	Number
Goals	John Tavares	Buffalo	35
Assists	John Tavares	Buffalo	23
Points	John Tavares	Buffalo	58
Penalty Minutes	Pat Welsh	Baltimore	38
Shots on Goal	Paul Gait	Detroit	**91**
Loose Balls	Jim Veltman	Buffalo	102

== Attendance ==
=== Regular season ===
Home team	Home games	Average attendance	Total attendance
Buffalo Bandits	4	16,325	65,300
Philadelphia Wings	4	16,314	65,255
New York Saints	4	12,136	48,543
Baltimore Thunder	4	8,893	35,572
Boston Blazers	4	7,399	29,596
Detroit Turbos	4	7,112	28,447
Pittsburgh Bulls	4	5,763	23,052
**League**	**28**	**10,563**	**295,765**

=== Playoffs ===
Home team	Home games	Average attendance	Total attendance
Buffalo Bandits	2	16,325	32,650
Philadelphia Wings	1	13,380	13,380
New York Saints	1	5,877	5,877
Boston Blazers	1	3,182	3,182
**League**	**5**	**11,018**	**55,089**

== See also ==
- 1993 in sports
