= 1994 Major Indoor Lacrosse League season =

1994 MILL season
- League: Major Indoor Lacrosse League
- Sport: Indoor lacrosse
- Duration: January 8, 1994 - April 16, 1994
- Games: 8
- Teams: 6
- TV partner(s): ESPN and ESPN2

Draft
- Top draft pick: John Webster
- Picked by: Philadelphia Wings

Regular season
- Season MVP: John Tavares (Buffalo Bandits)
- Top scorer: John Tavares (Buffalo Bandits)
- National champions: Buffalo Bandits
- National runners-up: Detroit Turbos
- American champions: Philadelphia Wings
- American runners-up: New York Saints

Champion's Cup
- Champions: Philadelphia Wings (3rd title)
- Runners-up: Buffalo Bandits
- Finals MVP: Paul Gait (Philadelphia)

MILL seasons
- ← 1993 season 1995 season →

The 1994 season is the 8th season of the league that began on January 8, 1994, and concluded with the championship game on April 16. In this season, a game between the Detroit Turbos and Philadelphia Wings, was the only game in MILL history to be called off exclusively for fighting.

== Team movement ==
The only change in teams from the 1993 MILL season to 1994 was the loss of the Pittsburgh Bulls.

=== Teams ===
1994 Major Indoor Lacrosse League
Division	Team	City	Arena	Capacity
American	Baltimore Thunder	Baltimore, Maryland	Baltimore Arena	10,582
American	New York Saints	Uniondale, New York	Nassau Veterans Memorial Coliseum	16,297
American	Philadelphia Wings	Philadelphia, Pennsylvania	Spectrum	17,382
National	Boston Blazers	Boston, Massachusetts	Boston Garden	14,448
National	Buffalo Bandits	Buffalo, New York	Buffalo Memorial Auditorium	16,325
National	Detroit Turbos	Detroit, Michigan	Joe Louis Arena	19,875

=== Map of teams ===
American Division National Division

== Regular season ==
National Division
P	Team	GP	W	L	PCT	GB	Home	Road	GF	GA	Diff	GF/GP	GA/GP
1	Buffalo Bandits – xyz	8	6	2	.750	0.0	3–1	3–1	121	99	+22	15.12	12.38
2	Detroit Turbos – x	8	5	3	.625	1.0	3–1	2–2	94	95	−1	11.75	11.88
3	Boston Blazers	8	4	4	.500	2.0	1–3	3–1	93	91	+2	11.62	11.38

American Division
P	Team	GP	W	L	PCT	GB	Home	Road	GF	GA	Diff	GF/GP	GA/GP
1	Philadelphia Wings – xy	8	6	2	.750	0.0	4–0	2–2	0	0	−-0	0.00	0.00
2	New York Saints – x	8	2	6	.250	4.0	2–2	0–4	0	0	−-0	0.00	0.00
3	Baltimore Thunder	8	1	7	.125	5.0	1–3	0–4	0	0	−-0	0.00	0.00

x: Clinched playoff berth; c: Clinched playoff berth by crossing over to another division; y: Clinched division; z: Clinched best regular season record; GP: Games Played
W: Wins; L: Losses; GB: Games back; PCT: Win percentage; Home: Record at Home; Road: Record on the Road; GF: Goals scored; GA: Goals allowed
Differential: Difference between goals scored and allowed; GF/GP: Average number of goals scored per game; GA/GP: Average number of goals allowed per game

== All Star Game ==
No All-Star Game was played in 1994.

== Playoffs ==
Semifinals
1	Buffalo	16
2	Detroit	10
1	Philadelphia	17
2	New York	7

Finals
N1	Buffalo	15
A1	Philadelphia	26

== Awards ==
Award	Winner	Team
MVP Award	John Tavares	Buffalo
Rookie of the Year Award	Tom Marechek	Philadelphia
Championship Game MVP	Paul Gait	Philadelphia

=== Weekly awards ===
In 1994, the MILL began awarding "Player of the Week" honours.

Week	Player of the Week
1	No award given
2	John Tavares
3	Tim Soudan
4	Jim Veltman
5	Thomas Carmean
6	Marty O'Neill
7	Sal LoCascio
8	Ted Dowling
9	Kevin Bilger
10	Dallas Eliuk
11	No award given

=== Monthly awards ===
An award is also given out monthly for the best overall player.

Month	Player of the Month
Jan	Steve Dietrich
Feb	Ted Dowling
Mar	Paul Gait

=== All-Pro Teams ===
First Team:

- Gary Gait, Philadelphia
- Paul Gait, Philadelphia
- Tim Soudan, Boston
- John Tavares, Buffalo
- Jim Veltman, Buffalo
- Dallas Eliuk, Philadelphia (goalie)

Second Team:

- Stu Aird, Buffalo
- Thomas Carmean, Boston
- Lindsey Dixon, Baltimore
- Ted Dowling, Detroit
- Kevin Finneran, Philadelphia
- Sal LoCascio, New York (goalie)

== Statistics leaders ==
Bold numbers indicate new single-season records. Italics indicate tied single-season records.

Stat	Player	Team	Number
Goals	Paul Gait	Philadelphia	31
Assists	Jim Veltman	Buffalo	24
Points	John Tavares	Buffalo	47
Penalty Minutes	Brian Kroneberger	Baltimore	25
Shots on Goal	John Tavares	Buffalo	83
Loose Balls	Jim Veltman	Buffalo	**130**
Save Pct	Dallas Eliuk	Philadelphia	**78.7**

== Attendance ==
=== Regular season ===
Home team	Home games	Average attendance	Total attendance
Buffalo Bandits	4	16,284	65,136
Philadelphia Wings	4	15,102	60,408
New York Saints	4	8,618	34,473
Boston Blazers	4	8,173	32,690
Baltimore Thunder	4	7,517	30,066
Detroit Turbos	4	4,983	19,932
**League**	**24**	**10,112**	**242,705**

=== Playoffs ===
Home team	Home games	Average attendance	Total attendance
Buffalo Bandits	2	16,060	32,120
Philadelphia Wings	1	10,794	10,794
**League**	**3**	**14,305**	**42,914**

== See also ==
- 1994 in sports
