= 1990 Major Indoor Lacrosse League season =

1990 MILL season
- League: Major Indoor Lacrosse League
- Sport: Indoor lacrosse
- Duration: January 5, 1990 - April 13, 1990
- Games: 8
- Teams: 6

Draft
- Top draft pick: Brendan Kelly
- Picked by: Pittsburgh Bulls

Regular season
- League champions: New England Blazers
- Runners-up: Philadelphia Wings
- Top scorer: Paul Gait (Detroit Turbos)

Champion's Cup
- Champions: Philadelphia Wings (2nd title)
- Runners-up: New England Blazers
- Finals MVP: Brad Kotz (Philadelphia)

MILL seasons
- ← 1989 season 1991 season →

The 1990 season is the 4th season of the league that began on January 5, 1990, and concluded with the championship game on April 13.

== Team movement ==
The Pittsburgh Bulls made their MILL debut in 1990, while the Washington Wave ceased operations.

=== Teams ===
1990 Major Indoor Lacrosse League
Team	City	Arena	Capacity
Baltimore Thunder	Baltimore, Maryland	Baltimore Arena	10,582
Detroit Turbos	Detroit, Michigan	Joe Louis Arena	19,875
New England Blazers	Worcester, Massachusetts	Worcester Centrum	12,135
New York Saints	Uniondale, New York	Nassau Veterans Memorial Coliseum	16,297
Philadelphia Wings	Philadelphia, Pennsylvania	Spectrum	17,423
Pittsburgh Bulls	Pittsburgh, Pennsylvania	Civic Arena	16,025

=== Map of teams ===
Major Indoor Lacrosse League teams

== Regular season ==
P	Team	GP	W	L	PCT	GB	Home	Road	GF	GA	Diff	GF/GP	GA/GP
1	New England Blazers – xyz	8	6	2	.750	0.0	3–1	3–1	95	80	+15	11.88	10.00
2	Philadelphia Wings – x	8	6	2	.750	0.0	3–1	3–1	89	82	+7	11.12	10.25
3	New York Saints – x	8	4	4	.500	2.0	1–3	3–1	77	78	−1	9.62	9.75
4	Baltimore Thunder	8	4	4	.500	2.0	2–2	2–2	96	95	+1	12.00	11.88
5	Pittsburgh Bulls	8	3	5	.375	3.0	2–2	1–3	86	86	−-0	10.75	10.75
6	Detroit Turbos	8	1	7	.125	5.0	1–3	0–4	89	111	−22	11.12	13.88

x: Clinched playoff berth; c: Clinched playoff berth by crossing over to another division; y: Clinched division; z: Clinched best regular season record; GP: Games Played
W: Wins; L: Losses; GB: Games back; PCT: Win percentage; Home: Record at Home; Road: Record on the Road; GF: Goals scored; GA: Goals allowed
Differential: Difference between goals scored and allowed; GF/GP: Average number of goals scored per game; GA/GP: Average number of goals allowed per game

== Playoffs ==
Semifinals			Championship
			2	Philadelphia	17
3	New York	8	1	New England	7
2	Philadelphia	9

== Awards ==
Award	Winner	Team
Championship Game MVP	Brad Kotz	Philadelphia

=== All-Pro Teams ===
First Team:

- John Fay, New England
- Brad Kotz, Philadelphia
- Brian Nikula, Pittsburgh
- Rick Sowell, Baltimore
- John Tucker, Philadelphia
- Ted Sawicki, Detroit (goalie)

Second Team:

- Don Borges, New York
- Toby Boucher, New England
- Ron Martinello, Detroit
- Dave Pietramala, Pittsburgh
- Tim Welsh, Baltimore
- Dan O'Neill, Boston (goalie)

== Statistics leaders ==
Bold numbers indicate new single-season records. Italics indicate tied single-season records.

Stat	Player	Team	Number
**Goals**	Brian Nikula	Pittsburgh	20
**Assists**	Terry Martinello	Detroit	20
**Points**	Terry Martinello	Detroit	34
**Penalty Minutes**	K. Forrester	Pittsburgh	28
**Shots on Goal**	Brian Nikula	Pittsburgh	70

== Attendance ==
=== Regular season ===
Home team	Home games	Average attendance	Total attendance
Philadelphia Wings	4	16,298	65,193
Detroit Turbos	4	11,910	47,639
Pittsburgh Bulls	4	10,840	43,359
Baltimore Thunder	4	9,556	38,223
New England Blazers	4	8,807	35,228
New York Saints	4	8,206	32,822
**League**	**24**	**10,936**	**262,464**

=== Playoffs ===
Home team	Home games	Average attendance	Total attendance
Philadelphia Wings	1	13,552	13,552
New England Blazers	1	11,479	11,479
**League**	**2**	**12,516**	**25,031**

== See also ==
- 1990 in sports
