= Jim Veltman =

Canadian lacrosse player (born 1966)

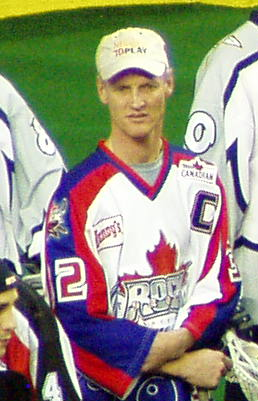

Personal information
- Nickname: Scoop
- Born: March 8, 1966 (age 60) Brampton, Ontario, Canada
- Height: 6 ft 2 in (188 cm)
- Weight: 185 lb (84 kg; 13 st 3 lb)

Sport
- Position: Defenseman
- Shoots: Left
- NLL team Former teams: Toronto Rock; Ontario Raiders; Buffalo Bandits
- Pro career: 1992–2008

James Edward Veltman (born March 8, 1966) is a Canadian former lacrosse player who played for the Toronto Rock, the Ontario Raiders, and the Buffalo Bandits in the National Lacrosse League. Veltman won three NLL championships with the Bandits and then five more with the Rock, where he was captain for ten seasons.

Veltman and Dallas Eliuk were inducted into the National Lacrosse League Hall of Fame in March, 2009.

== NLL career ==
Veltman began his NLL career in 1992 with the Buffalo Bandits. He played 5 seasons with the Bandits, winning three NLL Championships. After the 1996 season, Veltman and his wife travelled to Uganda where they did volunteer work for 17 months.

In 1998, Veltman returned to the NLL, moving with Bandit head coach Les Bartley to the expansion Ontario Raiders, based in Hamilton, Ontario. A year later, the Ontario franchise move to Toronto, becoming the Toronto Rock, where Jim has won five more NLL Championships. Veltman was the captain of the Rock from 1999 until his retirement following the 2008 season.

Jim Veltman led the National Lacrosse League in loose balls in 14 out of the 16 seasons he played, earning him the nickname "Scoop". On February 5, 2006, Veltman reached a milestone as he "scooped" his 2000th career loose ball. He also set the single season record for loose balls with 226 in the 2006 season. Veltman scooped 14 loose balls on April 8, 2006, to break his own previous record of 207, set in 2003. The record stood until Geoff Snider scooped 244 in 2008. John Tavares, the NLL's all-time leading scorer, considers Veltman to be "the best teammate he ever had."

Veltman was the first recipient of the National Lacrosse League Sportsmanship Award in 2002, and was named league MVP in 2004. He was also the first recipient of the Toronto Rock's Les Bartley Award (not to be confused with the NLL's Les Bartley Award for coach of the year).

On September 11, 2007, the Toronto Rock announced that they had resigned Veltman to a five-year agreement. Veltman would remain captain of the Rock for one more season, after which he would retire from playing and join the Rock coaching staff. The announcement ended speculation that Veltman was considering retiring to take the vacant Colorado Mammoth head coach position, a position eventually taken by Bob McMahon.

On April 27, 2008, Veltman played his last career game, as the Rock lost 15–14 to the Philadelphia Wings. Veltman had one goal, four assists, and 17 loose balls.

On April 12, 2019, Veltman's jersey number 32 was retired by the Toronto Rock in a pregame ceremony.

Off the floor, Veltman is a physical education teacher at Agincourt Collegiate Institute.

== Post-playing career ==
Following his retirement, Veltman became an assistant coach for the Rock in the 2009 season, later serving as the defensive coordinator for the New England Black Wolves in 2016 and 2017. He also served as head coach for the Czech national team at the 2011 World Indoor Lacrosse Championships in Prague. He was named the second general manager in New York Riptide franchise history on July 10, 2020. Veltman was relieved of his duties as Riptide GM on January 9, 2023.

== Canadian Lacrosse Association Career ==
1992 - Member of the Mann Cup winning Brampton Excelsiors
1993 - Member of the Mann Cup winning Brampton Excelsiors
1998 - Member of the Mann Cup winning Brampton Excelsiors
2003 - Member of the Mann Cup winning Victoria Shamrocks

== International Lacrosse Career ==
2003 - Captain of Team Canada, winners of the World Indoor Lacrosse Championships

== Statistics ==
=== NLL ===
Jim Veltman		Regular season									Playoffs								
Season	Team	GP	G	A	Pts	LB	PIM	Pts/GP	LB/GP	PIM/GP	GP	G	A	Pts	LB	PIM	Pts/GP	LB/GP	PIM/GP
1992	Buffalo Bandits	8	8	23	31	111	6	3.88	13.88	0.75	3	3	2	5	25	7	1.67	8.33	2.33
1993	Buffalo Bandits	6	7	20	27	102	14	4.50	17.00	2.33	2	0	7	7	19	4	3.50	9.50	2.00
1994	Buffalo Bandits	8	13	24	37	130	8	4.63	16.25	1.00	2	4	7	11	32	6	5.50	16.00	3.00
1995	Buffalo Bandits	8	16	24	40	91	8	5.00	11.38	1.00	1	2	4	6	12	2	6.00	12.00	2.00
1996	Buffalo Bandits	10	11	22	33	125	6	3.30	12.50	0.60	2	0	5	5	35	0	2.50	17.50	0.00
1998	Ontario Raiders	12	7	40	47	194	10	3.92	16.17	0.83	–	–	–	–	–	–	–	–	–
1999	Toronto Rock	12	12	32	44	166	6	3.67	13.83	0.50	2	2	10	12	33	4	6.00	16.50	2.00
2000	Toronto Rock	12	7	37	44	164	10	3.67	13.67	0.83	2	2	6	8	31	4	4.00	15.50	2.00
2001	Toronto Rock	14	9	23	32	161	13	2.29	11.50	0.93	2	1	2	3	19	2	1.50	9.50	1.00
2002	Toronto Rock	16	16	37	53	203	22	3.31	12.69	1.38	2	0	4	4	34	0	2.00	17.00	0.00
2003	Toronto Rock	16	16	43	59	207	12	3.69	12.94	0.75	2	2	5	7	20	2	3.50	10.00	1.00
2004	Toronto Rock	16	12	53	65	179	18	4.06	11.19	1.13	1	1	2	3	11	0	3.00	11.00	0.00
2005	Toronto Rock	13	8	28	36	193	29	2.77	14.85	2.23	2	2	7	9	36	2	4.50	18.00	1.00
2006	Toronto Rock	16	6	36	42	226	32	2.63	14.13	2.00	1	1	2	3	13	0	3.00	13.00	0.00
2007	Toronto Rock	13	3	34	37	143	10	2.85	11.00	0.77	1	0	1	1	10	0	1.00	10.00	0.00
2008	Toronto Rock	14	6	17	23	122	8	1.64	8.71	0.57	–	–	–	–	–	–	–	–	–
		194	157	493	650	2,517	212	3.35	12.97	1.09	25	20	64	84	330	33	3.36	13.20	1.32
Career Total:		219	177	557	734	2,847	245	3.35	13.00	1.12									

GP–Games played; G–Goals; A–Assists; Pts–Points; LB–Loose balls; PIM–Penalty minutes; Pts/GP–Points per games played; LB/GP–Loose balls per games played; PIM/GP–Penalty minutes per games played.

== Awards ==
Preceded by Gary Gait	NLL Most Valuable Player; 2004	Succeeded by Colin Doyle
Preceded by none	NLL Sportsmanship Award; 2002	Succeeded by Chris Driscoll
Preceded by none	Toronto Rock captain 1999–2008 seasons	Succeeded by Chris Driscoll
