= 1991 Major Indoor Lacrosse League season =

1991 MILL season
- League: Major Indoor Lacrosse League
- Sport: Indoor lacrosse
- Duration: December 29, 1990 - April 6, 1991
- Games: 10
- Teams: 6
- TV partner: Prime Network

Draft
- Top draft pick: Gary Gait
- Picked by: Detroit Turbos

Regular season
- Top scorer: Paul Gait (Detroit Turbos)
- National champions: Detroit Turbos
- National runners-up: Pittsburgh Bulls
- American champions: Baltimore Thunder
- American runners-up: New York Saints

Champion's Cup
- Champions: Detroit Turbos (1st title)
- Runners-up: Baltimore Thunder
- Finals MVP: Gary Gait (Detroit)

MILL seasons
- ← 1990 season 1992 season →

The 1991 season is the 5th season of the league that began on December 29, 1990, and concluded with the championship game on April 6, 1991.

== Team movement ==
No teams were added, removed, or relocated in the 1991 season. However, the MILL did divide the six teams into two divisions: Detroit, Pittsburgh, and New England comprised the National Division, and the American Division was Baltimore, New York, and Philadelphia.

=== Teams ===
1991 Major Indoor Lacrosse League
Division	Team	City	Arena	Capacity
American	Baltimore Thunder	Baltimore, Maryland	Baltimore Arena	10,582
American	New York Saints	Uniondale, New York	Nassau Veterans Memorial Coliseum	16,297
American	Philadelphia Wings	Philadelphia, Pennsylvania	Spectrum	17,382
National	Detroit Turbos	Detroit, Michigan	Joe Louis Arena	19,875
National	New England Blazers	Worcester, Massachusetts	Worcester Centrum	12,135
National	Pittsburgh Bulls	Pittsburgh, Pennsylvania	Civic Arena	16,164

=== Map of teams ===
American Division National Division

== Regular season ==
National Division
P	Team	GP	W	L	PCT	GB	Home	Road	GF	GA	Diff	GF/GP	GA/GP
1	Detroit Turbos – xyz	10	8	2	.800	0.0	4–1	4–1	184	136	+48	18.40	13.60
2	Pittsburgh Bulls	10	3	7	.300	5.0	1–4	2–3	125	158	−33	12.50	15.80
3	New England Blazers	10	3	7	.300	5.0	2–3	1–4	109	136	−27	10.90	13.60

American Division
P	Team	GP	W	L	PCT	GB	Home	Road	GF	GA	Diff	GF/GP	GA/GP
1	Baltimore Thunder – xy	10	6	4	.600	0.0	3–2	3–2	156	157	−1	15.60	15.70
2	New York Saints	10	5	5	.500	1.0	3–2	2–3	146	131	+15	14.60	13.10
3	Philadelphia Wings	10	5	5	.500	1.0	3–2	2–3	129	131	−2	12.90	13.10

x: Clinched playoff berth; c: Clinched playoff berth by crossing over to another division; y: Clinched division; z: Clinched best regular season record; GP: Games Played
W: Wins; L: Losses; GB: Games back; PCT: Win percentage; Home: Record at Home; Road: Record on the Road; GF: Goals scored; GA: Goals allowed
Differential: Difference between goals scored and allowed; GF/GP: Average number of goals scored per game; GA/GP: Average number of goals allowed per game

== All Star Game ==
The first-ever MILL All-Star Game was held at the Spectrum in Philadelphia during the 1991 season. The National Division defeated the American Division 25-20.

== Playoffs ==
=== Championship ===
Detroit 14 @ Baltimore 12

== Awards ==
Award	Winner	Team
Rookie of the Year Award	Gary Gait	Detroit
Championship Game MVP	Gary Gait	Detroit

=== All-Pro Teams ===
First Team:

- John Conley, Philadelphia
- Gary Gait, Detroit
- Paul Gait, Detroit
- Rick Sowell, Baltimore
- John Tucker, Philadelphia
- Ted Sawicki, Detroit (goalie)

Second Team:

- Jeff Jackson, Baltimore
- Butch Marino, Pittsburgh
- Mike Cummings, New York
- John Nostrant, Philadelphia
- Brian Nikula, Pittsburgh
- Sal LoCascio, New York (goalie)

== Statistics leaders ==
Bold numbers indicate new single-season records. Italics indicate tied single-season records.

Stat	Player	Team	Number
**Goals**	Paul Gait	Detroit	**47**
**Assists**	Gary Gait	Detroit	**36**
**Points**	Gary Gait	Detroit	**68**
**Penalty Minutes**	Neil Doddridge	Detroit	**39**

== Attendance ==
Home team	Home games	Average attendance	Total attendance
Philadelphia Wings	5	15,543	77,714
Baltimore Thunder	5	8,936	44,678
New York Saints	5	8,719	43,597
Pittsburgh Bulls	5	8,277	41,387
Detroit Turbos	5	7,854	39,269
New England Blazers	5	6,826	34,132
**League**	**30**	**9,359**	**280,777**

10,814 were in attendance at Baltimore Arena to see the visiting Detroit Turbos defeat the Baltimore Thunder in the championship game.

== See also ==
- 1991 in sports
