= Detroit Turbos =

Former NLL professional box lacrosse team

- Sport: Box lacrosse
- League: Major Indoor Lacrosse League
- Division: National
- Location: Detroit, Michigan
- Arena: Joe Louis Arena
- Colors: Purple, Silver, Black
- Championships: 1 (1991)
- Division titles: 2 (1991, 1992)

The Detroit Turbos were a member of the Major Indoor Lacrosse League from 1989 to 1994. They were based in Detroit, Michigan. Led by Paul and Gary Gait in their first year in the NLL, the Turbos won the 1991 MILL Championship.

== Awards and honors ==
Year	Player	Award
1991	Gary Gait	Rookie of the Year
1991	Gary Gait	Championship Game MVP

== All time record ==
Season	Division	W-L	Finish	Home	Road	GF	GA	Coach	Playoffs	Source
1989	N/A	6–2	2nd	3–1	3–1	104	87	Medo Martinello	Lost in semifinals	
1990	N/A	1–7	6th	1–3	0–4	89	111	Medo Martinello	Missed playoffs	
1991	National	8–2	1st	4–1	4–1	184	136	Medo Martinello	Won Championship	
1992	National	6–2	1st	2–2	4–0	140	107	Medo Martinello	Lost in division finals	
1993	National	3–5	2nd	2–2	1–3	109	122	Shane Sanderson	Lost in division semifinals	
1994	National	5–3	2nd	3–1	2–2	94	95	Shane Sanderson	Lost in division finals	
Total	6 seasons	29–21		15–10	14–11	720	658	1 championship		

== Playoff results ==
Season	Game	Visiting	Home
1989	Semifinals	New York 9	Detroit 8 (2OT)
1991	Championship	Detroit 14	Baltimore 12
1992	Divisional Finals	Buffalo 19	Detroit 16
1993	Divisional Semifinals	Detroit 5	Boston 18
1994	Divisional Finals	Detroit 10	Buffalo 16

== Attendance ==
Season	Attendance
1989	11,496
1990	11,910
1991	7,854
1992	7,512
1993	7,112
1994	4,983

== Championships ==
Preceded by Philadelphia Wings	Major Indoor Lacrosse League Champions; 1991	Succeeded by Buffalo Bandits
