= Paul Gait =

Canadian lacrosse player and coach

Personal information
- Born: April 5, 1967 (age 59) Victoria, Canada

Sport
- Position: Attack
- Shoots: Left/Right
- NCAA team: Syracuse University
- NLL draft: 6th overall, 1990; Detroit Turbos
- NLL teams: Detroit Turbos; Philadelphia Wings; Rochester Knighthawks; Syracuse Smash; Washington Power; Colorado Mammoth
- MLL teams: Long Island Lizards; Boston Cannons
- Former WLA team: Victoria Shamrocks
- Pro career: 1991–2002, 2005
- U.S. Lacrosse Hall of Fame, 2005; Canadian Lacrosse Hall of Fame, 2014; NLL Hall of Fame, 2006

Paul Gait (born April 5, 1967) is a Canadian lacrosse player and coach. He is widely regarded as one of the best lacrosse players of all time and is the current Vice President of the Rochester Knighthawks of the National Lacrosse League. Gait, along with his twin brother Gary Gait, had outstanding playing careers at Syracuse University, in the National Lacrosse League, Major League Lacrosse, the Western Lacrosse Association, and at the international level for Canada.

== College career ==
Paul and his twin brother Gary played NCAA lacrosse at Syracuse University as midfielders, where they set numerous records from 1987 to 1990 and popularized innovative moves such as behind-the-back passing and scoring. One of the best NCAA players of all time, Paul helped lead Syracuse to three national championships and was selected as a First Team All-Americans by the USILA three times, in 1988, 1989, and 1990. Paul was also named the Most Outstanding Player of the 1989 NCAA Division I Lacrosse Championship Tournament.

After defeating Loyola in the 1990 NCAA Division I lacrosse tournament finals, the NCAA determined that head coach Roy Simmons Jr's wife Nancy Simmons had improperly co-signed for a car loan for Paul Gait. Gait was ruled ineligible for postseason play, and Syracuse vacated their tournament records and title.

After college, he played with his brother for the storied amateur Mount Washington Lacrosse Club in the 1990s.

== Professional career ==
Paul and Gary have both starred at all levels of professional lacrosse, including the National Lacrosse League, the Western Lacrosse Association, Major League Lacrosse, and at the international level for the Canadian National Team. Paul was a 3-time winner of the Mann Cup MVP award. The twins were named Co-MVPs of the Mann Cup in 1999, when they played for the Victoria Shamrocks. Paul initially retired from play following the 2002 NLL season but then returned during the 2005 NLL season to play for the Colorado Mammoth with his brother. He played four games totaling nine points and then retired again after the 2005 season. Paul is sixth all time on the NLL points total list with 712 points in 13 seasons. In 2001 Paul was named the MLL playoff and championship game MVP, after leading the Long Island Lizards to their first MLL title, with a record setting 7 goal performance,(on 8 shots)in the MLL championship game. In 2002 Paul led the NLL in goals and points and was named the league MVP. He retired due to the early onset osteoarthritis in his back, ankles and elbows.

In 1990, Paul represented STX Lacrosse as a Sales Representative. In 1994 Paul started GBLax, a lacrosse specialty retail business located in Syracuse NY. In 1996 Paul sold GBLAX and became an independent lacrosse equipment design/developer for J.deBeer & Son, where he developed a line of lacrosse equipment for the softball manufacturing company. He was hired full-time by deBeer in 1996 where he worked, in various roles until 2011, ultimately becoming the company president between 2003 and 2011. In his tenure at deBeer he was credited for developing the modern women's lacrosse head (Apex) and has revolutionized the women's lacrosse pocket. He also introduced the Gait Brand of men's lacrosse equipment in 2003. deBeer/Gait quickly became the world's leading producer of women's lacrosse equipment and Canadian box lacrosse gear. In 2011 Paul founded Team 22 Lacrosse(Guilderland, NY), the exclusive licensee for Under Armour lacrosse products. Paul has 30 lacrosse related patents issued during his time in the business. Paul is also the founder of Laxpocket LLC, the country's leading producer of women's lacrosse pockets. Both Laxpocket and Team 22 Lacrosse are located in the Albany, NY area.

Paul was named the head coach of the Rochester Knighthawks on December 26, 2008, where he coached for two years.

== Awards ==
NLL Weekly and Monthly Awards:

- Player of the Week (1994–2001) 7 times
- Overall Player of the Week (2002-) twice
- Offensive Player of the Week (2002-) 3 times
- Player of the Month 5 times

Paul along with his twin brother Gary Gait were inducted into The British Columbia Sports Hall of Fame on September 13, 2011 in a ceremony in Vancouver, BC.

In 2005, both Gait brothers were inducted into the United States Lacrosse National Hall of Fame. The following year, in 2006, both brothers were among the five charter members to be voted into the National Lacrosse League Hall of Fame. Paul, Gary and Jim Brown were also named to the NCAA all century team.

Gait's #19 jersey was retired by Syracuse University in 2024. He is the third men's lacrosse player to have his jersey retired after brother Gary Gait and Mike Powell.

== Personal life ==
Gait was paralyzed from the waist-down after a 20-ft fall at the Gait Lacrosse warehouse in Altamont, New York on November 3, 2022. The fall left him partially paralyzed and unable to walk again. He underwent spinal fusion surgery at Albany Medical Center.

== Statistics ==
=== Major League Lacrosse ===
| | | Regular Season | | | | | | | Playoffs |
| Season | Team | GP | G | 2ptG | A | Pts | LB | PIM | GP | G | 2ptG | A | Pts | LB | PIM |
|---|---|---|---|---|---|---|---|---|---|---|---|---|---|---|---|
| 2001 | Long Island | 6 | 10 | 0 | 7 | 17 | 9 | 0.0 | 2 | 10 | 0 | 2 | 12 | 10 | 0.0 |
| 2002 | Boston | 3 | 6 | 2 | 0 | 8 | 1 | 0.0 | -- | -- | -- | -- | -- | -- | -- |
| MLL Totals | | 9 | 16 | 2 | 7 | 25 | 10 | 0.0 | 2 | 10 | 0 | 2 | 12 | 10 | 0.0 |

=== NLL ===
| | | Regular Season | | | | | | Playoffs |
| Season | Team | GP | G | A | Pts | LB | PIM | GP | G | A | Pts | LB | PIM |
|---|---|---|---|---|---|---|---|---|---|---|---|---|---|
| 1991 | Detroit | 10 | 47 | 19 | 66 | 63 | 20 | 1 | 3 | 1 | 4 | 2 | 0 |
| 1992 | Detroit | 7 | 33 | 20 | 53 | 30 | 4 | 1 | 5 | 3 | 8 | 6 | 0 |
| 1993 | Philadelphia | 8 | 28 | 13 | 41 | 65 | 8 | 2 | 6 | 5 | 11 | 15 | 4 |
| 1994 | Philadelphia | 8 | 31 | 13 | 44 | 58 | 8 | 2 | 12 | 7 | 19 | 28 | 0 |
| 1995 | Rochester | 8 | 23 | 13 | 36 | 39 | 0 | 2 | 9 | 6 | 15 | 9 | 0 |
| 1996 | Rochester | 9 | 24 | 21 | 45 | 64 | 4 | 1 | 3 | 2 | 5 | 7 | 2 |
| 1997 | Rochester | 10 | 40 | 25 | 65 | 58 | 6 | 2 | 10 | 6 | 16 | 10 | 4 |
| 1998 | Syracuse | 11 | 28 | 23 | 51 | 46 | 4 | -- | -- | -- | -- | -- | -- |
| 1999 | Syracuse | 12 | 37 | 37 | 74 | 62 | 12 | -- | -- | -- | -- | -- | -- |
| 2000 | Syracuse | 4 | 8 | 13 | 21 | 34 | 2 | -- | -- | -- | -- | -- | -- |
| 2001 | Washington | 14 | 27 | 25 | 52 | 52 | 8 | 1 | 2 | 2 | 4 | 5 | 0 |
| 2002 | Washington | 16 | 54 | 60 | 114 | 107 | 6 | 2 | 1 | 6 | 7 | 8 | 0 |
| 2005 | Colorado | 4 | 6 | 3 | 9 | 13 | 2 | 1 | 1 | 0 | 1 | 0 | 0 |
| Totals | | 128 | 410 | 302 | 712 | 734 | 88 | 15 | 52 | 38 | 90 | 90 | 10 |

=== Syracuse University ===
| Season | GP | G | A | Pts | PPG |
|---|---|---|---|---|---|
| 1987 | 13 | 11 | 3 | 14 | 1.08 |
| 1988 | 15 | 47 | 19 | 66 | 4.40 |
| 1989 | 15 | 38 | 29 | 67 | 4.47 |
| 1990 | 13 | 31 | 34 | 65 | 5.00 |
| Totals | 56 | 127 | 85 | 212 | 3.79 |

=== NLL head coaching statistics ===
| Team | Season | Regular Season | | | | Playoffs | | | | Playoff result |
| Team | Season | GC | W | L | W% | GC | W | L | W% | Playoff result |
|---|---|---|---|---|---|---|---|---|---|---|
| Rochester Knighthawks | 2009 | 16 | 7 | 9 | .438 | 1 | 0 | 1 | .000 | Lost Division Semifinal (NY) |
| Rochester Knighthawks | 2010 | 16 | 7 | 9 | .438 | – | – | – | – | Did not qualify |
| Totals: | 2 | 32 | 14 | 18 | .438 | 1 | 0 | 1 | .000 | |

| Preceded by John Tavares | MILL Championship game MVP; 1994 | Succeeded by Gary Gait |
| Preceded by John Tavares | NLL Most Valuable Player; 2002 | Succeeded by Gary Gait |
| Preceded by None | New Balance Major League Lacrosse; Championship Game MVP; 2001 | Succeeded by Mark Millon |

== See also ==
- Syracuse Orange men's lacrosse
