= Pittsburgh Bulls =

Former NLL professional box lacrosse team

- Sport: Box lacrosse
- Founded: 1990
- Disbanded: 1993
- League: Major Indoor Lacrosse League
- Division: National
- Location: Pittsburgh, Pennsylvania
- Arena: Pittsburgh Civic Arena
- Colors: Black, Gold
- Championships: 0

The Pittsburgh Bulls were a member of the Major Indoor Lacrosse League from 1990 to 1993.They were based in Pittsburgh, Pennsylvania. The National Lacrosse League would return to Pittsburgh in 2000 with the Pittsburgh CrosseFire, but the team would only stay for one season before moving to become the Washington Power.

Dennis Wey served as head coach for all four seasons.

== All time record ==
| Season | Division | W-L | Finish | Home | Road | GF | GA | Coach | Playoffs |
|---|---|---|---|---|---|---|---|---|---|
| 1990 | | 3–5 | 5th | 2–2 | 1–3 | 86 | 86 | Dennis Wey | Missed playoffs |
| 1991 | National | 3–7 | 2nd | 1–4 | 2–3 | 125 | 158 | Dennis Wey | Missed playoffs |
| 1992 | National | 3–5 | 4th | 2–2 | 1–3 | 97 | 121 | Dennis Wey | Missed playoffs |
| 1993 | National | 1–7 | 4th | 0–4 | 1–3 | 97 | 108 | Dennis Wey | Missed playoffs |
| Total | 4 seasons | 10–24 | | 5–12 | 5–12 | 405 | 473 | | |

== See also ==
- Lacrosse in Pennsylvania
