= National Lacrosse League =

North American professional box lacrosse league

- Current season, competition or edition: 2027 NLL season
- Formerly: Eagle Pro Box Lacrosse League (1986–1988); Major Indoor Lacrosse League (1988–1997)
- Sport: Box lacrosse
- Founded: 1986; 40 years ago
- First season: 1987
- Commissioner: Brett Frood
- No. of teams: 12
- Countries: Canada (6 teams); United States (6 teams)
- Headquarters: Philadelphia, Pennsylvania, U.S.
- Most recent champions: Toronto Rock (7th title)
- Most titles: Buffalo Bandits; Toronto Rock (7 titles)
- Broadcaster: FloSports
- Website: NLL.com

The National Lacrosse League (NLL) is a professional box lacrosse league in North America. The league comprises 12 teams – 6 in the United States and 6 in Canada. The NLL is headquartered in Philadelphia, Pennsylvania.

The NLL once ranked third in average attendance for pro indoor sports worldwide, behind only the National Hockey League (NHL) and National Basketball Association (NBA). Unlike other box lacrosse leagues, which play in the summer, the NLL plays its games in the winter and spring, from December to June. Each year, the playoff teams battle for the National Lacrosse League Cup. The NLL has averaged between 8,900 and 10,700 spectators per game each year since 2004.

== Box lacrosse rules ==
The NLL plays four 15-minute quarters with 2-minute breaks between quarters and a 15-minute half-time. At the start of the each quarter and after every goal, players "face-off" at the center of the field to determine who will get possession. This is done by the two players pushing the heads of their sticks together with the game ball in the middle. A scrum-like match usually happens when the players on either team try and win the ball. Unlike traditional field lacrosse, box lacrosse is played on an standard ice hockey rink with artificial turf and to cover the ice.

If a game is tied after regulation, the two teams play sudden death overtime. Each team may take a 45-second timeout per half. Each team dresses 19 players: 2 goaltenders and 17 "runners". NLL goals are 4 feet 9 inches (1.45 m) wide and 4 feet (1.22 m) tall. Similar to ice hockey there six players which consist of 5 runners and one goaltender on the field at a time with players playing shifts and constant substitution throughout the game.

The NLL uses a 30-second shot clock, which is similar to a professional or collegiate basketball shot clock. The clock starts its countdown once one team gets possession of the ball. If the offense does not shoot the ball in time, they lose possession. However, if the offense shoots on goal and then retrieves the ball, the shot clock is restarted.

Similar to ice hockey, Fighting is a 5-minute major penalty and does not result in an automatic ejection.

== Season and playoffs ==
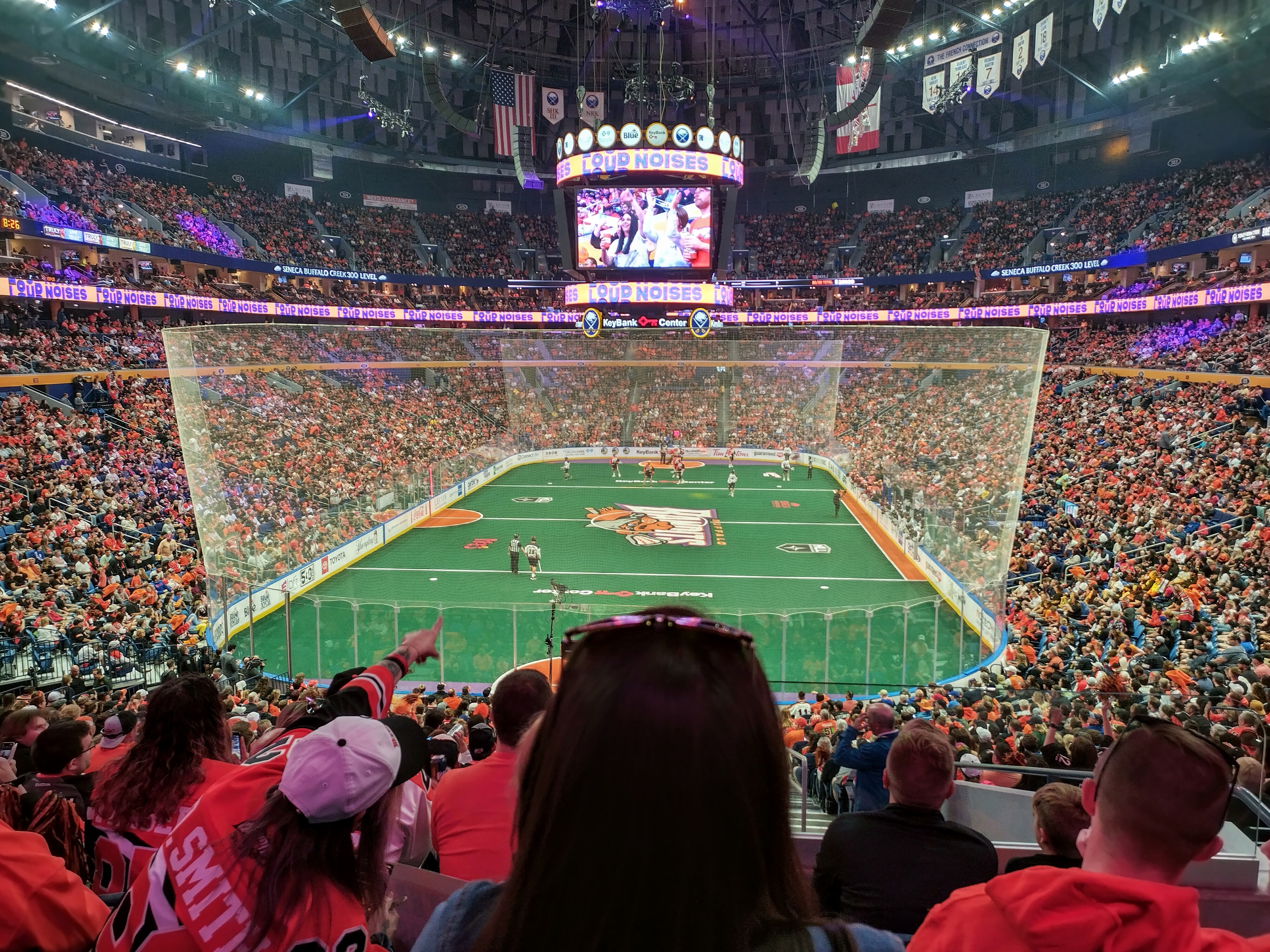
The Colorado Mammoth visit the Buffalo Bandits in Game 3 of the 2022 NLL Cup Finals

Each team in the NLL plays eighteen games during the regular season, nine each at home and away. The league has one standings table for its 14 teams. NLL games are typically played on Fridays, Saturdays, and Sundays while some weekends see teams play twice.

The regular season begins in December and ends in April. Starting in 2018, the league announced that the playoffs would be expanded to eight teams to accommodate expansion.

Beginning with the 2024 season, the playoffs feature the top 8 teams in the standings. The first round is single-elimination, and the Conference Finals and Championship rounds are best-of-three.

== Players ==
Most NLL players have full-time jobs off the floor, such as former Buffalo Bandits player John Tavares, who is a high school teacher in Mississauga, Ontario.

Although six of the thirteen teams are based in the U.S., less than 7% of players are American. Approximately 83% are Canadian and 10% are Haudenosaunee, from either Canada or the U.S.

== Teams ==
=== Current teams ===
Beginning with the 2024 NLL season, the league eliminated its East and West Conferences that existed during the 2023 NLL season and all teams play in a single division with every team playing every other team at least once.

Overview of NLL teams
Team	City	Arena	Capacity	Founded	Joined	Head coach
Buffalo Bandits	Buffalo, New York	KeyBank Center	19,070	1991	1992	John Tavares
Calgary Roughnecks	Calgary, Alberta	Scotiabank Saddledome	19,289	2001	2002	Josh Sanderson
Colorado Mammoth	Denver, Colorado	Ball Arena	18,007	1987*	2003	Pat Coyle
Georgia Swarm	Duluth, Georgia	Gas South Arena	10,500	2004*	2015	Ed Comeau
Halifax Thunderbirds	Halifax, Nova Scotia	Scotiabank Centre	10,595	1995*	2019	Mike Accursi
Las Vegas Desert Dogs	Henderson, Nevada	Lee's Family Forum	5,567	2021	2022	Shawn Williams
Oshawa FireWolves	Oshawa, Ontario	Tribute Communities Centre	5,180	1987*	2025	Glenn Clark
Rochester Knighthawks	Rochester, New York	Blue Cross Arena	10,662	2019	2019	Randy Mearns
San Diego Seals	Oceanside, California	Frontwave Arena	5,500	2017	2018	Patrick Merrill
Saskatchewan Rush	Saskatoon, Saskatchewan	SaskTel Centre	15,195	2005*	2015	Jimmy Quinlan
Toronto Rock	Hamilton, Ontario	TD Coliseum	17,383	1998*	1999	Matt Sawyer
Vancouver Warriors	Vancouver, British Columbia	Rogers Arena	18,910	2000*	2013	Curt Malawsky

An asterisk (*) denotes the franchise moved to its present location and has been in one or more previous locations in its history (see franchise timeline below or team pages for relocation history).

=== Former teams ===
The following lists franchises that are no longer active in the NLL.

Overview of former NLL teams
Team	City	Years active	Notes
Washington Wave	Washington, D.C.	1987–1989	
Baltimore Thunder	Baltimore, Maryland	1987–1999	Relocated to Pittsburgh (Pittsburgh CrosseFire)
New York Saints	Uniondale, New York	1987–2003	Relocated from East Rutherford, New Jersey (New Jersey Saints)
Philadelphia Wings	Philadelphia, Pennsylvania	1987–2014	Relocated to Uncasville (New England Black Wolves)
Detroit Turbos	Detroit, Michigan	1989–1994	
Boston Blazers	Boston, Massachusetts	1989–1997	Relocated from Worcester, Massachusetts (New England Blazers)
Pittsburgh Bulls	Pittsburgh, Pennsylvania	1990–1993	
Rochester Knighthawks	Rochester, New York	1995–2019	Relocated to Halifax (Halifax Thunderbirds)
Charlotte Cobras	Charlotte, North Carolina	1996	
Ontario Raiders	Hamilton, Ontario, Canada	1998	Relocated to Toronto (Toronto Rock)
Syracuse Smash	Syracuse, New York	1998–2000	Relocated to Ottawa (Ottawa Rebel)
Pittsburgh CrosseFire	Pittsburgh, Pennsylvania	2000	Relocated to Washington (Washington Power)
Albany Attack	Albany, New York	2000–2003	Relocated to San Jose (San Jose Stealth)
Ottawa Rebel	Ottawa, Ontario, Canada	2001–2003	Relocated to Edmonton (Edmonton Rush)
Washington Power	Washington, DC	2001-2002	Relocated to Denver (Colorado Mammoth)
Arizona Sting	Glendale, Arizona	2001–2007	Relocated from Columbus, Ohio (Columbus Landsharks)
Montreal Express	Montreal, Quebec, Canada	2002	Relocated to Saint Paul (Minnesota Swarm) in 2004
Anaheim Storm	Anaheim, California	2002–2005	Relocated from East Rutherford, New Jersey (New Jersey Storm)
Vancouver Ravens	Vancouver, British Columbia	2002–2004	
San Jose Stealth	San Jose, California	2004–2009	Relocated to Everett (Washington Stealth)
Minnesota Swarm	Saint Paul, Minnesota	2004–2015	Relocated to Duluth, Georgia (Georgia Swarm)
Edmonton Rush	Edmonton, Alberta, Canada	2005–2015	Relocated to Saskatoon (Saskatchewan Rush)
Portland LumberJax	Portland, Oregon	2006–2009	
Orlando Titans	Orlando, Florida	2007–2010	Relocated from New York City (New York Titans)
Chicago Shamrox	Hoffman Estates, Illinois	2007–2008	
Washington Stealth	Everett, Washington	2010–2013	Relocated to Vancouver (Vancouver Warriors)
New England Black Wolves	Uncasville, Connecticut	2015–2020	Relocated to Albany (Albany FireWolves)
New York Riptide	Uniondale, New York	2018–2024	Relocated to Ottawa (Ottawa Black Bears) starting in the 2024–25 season
Panther City Lacrosse Club	Fort Worth, Texas	2021–2024	
Albany FireWolves	Albany, New York	2021–2025	Relocated to Oshawa (Oshawa FireWolves)
Philadelphia Wings	Philadelphia, Pennsylvania	2018–2026	Folded
Ottawa Black Bears	Ottawa, Ontario	2024–2026	Folded due to no ownership group

== History ==
NLL Progression
Year	Teams	Games played
1987	4 teams	6 games
1988	4 teams	8 games
1989	6 teams	8 games
1990	6 teams	8 games
1991	6 teams	10 games
1992	7 teams	8 games
1993	7 teams	8 games
1994	6 teams	8 games
1995	6 teams	8 games
1996	7 teams	10 games
1997	6 teams	10 games
1998	7 teams	12 games
1999	7 teams	12 games
2000	8 teams	12 games
2001	9 teams	14 games
2002	13 teams	16 games
2003	12 teams	16 games
2004	10 teams	16 games
2005	10 teams	16 games
2006	11 teams	16 games
2007	13 teams	16 games
2008	12 teams	16 games
2009	12 teams	16 games
2010	11 teams	16 games
2011	10 teams	16 games
2012	9 teams	16 games
2013	9 teams	16 games
2014	9 teams	18 games
2015	9 teams	18 games
2016	9 teams	18 games
2017	9 teams	18 games
2018	9 teams	18 games
2019	11 teams	18 games
2020	13 teams	18 (12 played)
2021	Season cancelled	
2022	14 teams	18 games
2023	15 teams	18 games
2024	15 teams	18 games
2025	14 teams	18 games
2026	14 teams	18 games
2027	12 teams	18 games

=== Eagle Pro Box Lacrosse League ===
The rebirth of major professional box lacrosse in the United States came on March 13, 1986, with the formation of the Eagle Pro Box Lacrosse League (EPBLL), which was incorporated by Russ Cline and Chris Fritz. The "Eagle League" moniker was inspired by a meeting with Iroquois leaders, whose culture views the animal as a tutelary spirit. Previously, in 1985, box lacrosse sponsored an event played at the Spectrum in Philadelphia. The USA/Canada Superseries was an eight-game series seen as a precursor to the new league.

Darrell Russell was named commissioner of the league, which had four teams based in Philadelphia, Baltimore, Washington, D.C., and East Rutherford, New Jersey. The EPBLL opened play for the 1987 season with two games on January 10, 1987: the Philadelphia Wings at the New Jersey Saints (Philadelphia defeated New Jersey 11–8) and the Baltimore Thunder at the Washington Wave.

The four teams contested a six-game regular season before a postseason that saw all four teams qualify for a single knockout tournament, which ended with the Baltimore Thunder being crowned as the EPBLL's first champion. Coached by Bob Griebe, the Baltimore Thunder defeated the Washington Wave by a score of 11–10 to capture the league's first championship.

The league announced that a total of 124,536 fans attended Eagle Pro Box Lacrosse League games in its first season.

==== 1988 ====
The same four teams played in the second season of the EPBLL. The teams expanded to an eight-game schedule, and set up a three-team playoff with the regular season winner claiming a bye to the title game. The New Jersey Saints became the second league champions by defeating the Washington Wave 17–16 before 8,125 fans at the Capital Centre. For the Wave, it was the second time in as many years they reached the championship game, only to lose a one-goal game.

After the season, the league announced that the champion Saints would relocate to the Nassau Coliseum on Long Island and be called the New York Saints beginning in the 1989 season. Moreover, the league itself would be changing its name, adopting the more conventional Major Indoor Lacrosse League (MILL) name, as the spiritual implications of its original name proved too cryptic for most people to understand.

The MILL announced that it awarded expansion teams to Detroit and Boston, to begin play in the 1989 season. The Detroit team was named the Turbos, and played at Joe Louis Arena; the Boston entry was called the New England Blazers and they played their home games at the Worcester Centrum.

=== Major Indoor Lacrosse League ===
MILL logo

==== 1989 ====
Each of the six teams played an eight-game schedule in 1989, with an even four home and road games.

In its first ever regular season game, 12,171 fans watched the expansion Turbos defeat the Washington Wave 11–9 in Detroit to start 1989 season. As the season went on, regular season attendance figures for the league totaled at 230,724 for 24 regular season games, which made an average of 9,614 people in the stands per game. When adding the postseason, the numbers grew to 255,088 total and an average of 9,811 a game. The Philadelphia Wings captured the league championship in front of a record postseason crowd of 16,042 at the Spectrum, defeating the New York Saints 11–10.

After the championship game, the league announced expansion into Pittsburgh, with a team called the Pittsburgh Bulls. The new team effectively replaced the Washington Wave, who closed operations after three seasons.

==== 1990 ====
In 1990, each of the six teams played an eight-game schedule. Near the end of the season, the New York Saints defeated the Philadelphia Wings 8–5 before the first sellout and the largest crowd in league history: 17,177 at the Spectrum in Philadelphia. The Saints' victory forced a playoff rematch the following week. However, the Wings won that game and later went on to become the first team to win a second league championship, defeating the New England Blazers 17–7 in front of 11,479 fans for their second consecutive title.

The league announced that attendance for 26 total games during the season was 287,585, increasing the average attendance per game to 11,060. After the season, the MILL announced the signing of twin brothers Paul Gait and Gary Gait, 3-time All-Americans at Syracuse, to the Detroit Turbos after being drafted. The two brothers had won national championships with the Syracuse Orange in 1988, 1989, and 1990.

==== 1991 ====
In 1991, the season schedule increased from 8 to 10 games, with each team playing five games at home and five games on the road.

In the first game of the regular season, the debut of Detroit rookie twin brothers Paul and Gary Gait was successful, as they paced the Turbos to a 20–16 victory over the Baltimore Thunder. 1991 was a record-breaking year, especially in Detroit. The Gaits set new standards in most offensive categories. Paul scored a record 47 goals, while Gary was second in the league with 32. Gary established new records with 36 assists and 68 points. As a team, Detroit set records for goals scored with 184, assists with 227, and total points with 411. The Turbos went on to defeat the Thunder 14–12 to claim their first championship. The championship game was attended by 10,814 at the Baltimore Arena. Final league attendance numbers for the 1991 season reached 287,654. On April 20, 1991, the National Division All-Stars defeated the American Division All-Stars, 25–20, in the inaugural League All-Star Game at the Spectrum in Philadelphia.

After the season, the league announced that Buffalo had been awarded an expansion team for the 1992 season. The team was named the Bandits.

==== 1992 ====
The league reverted to an eight-game schedule for the 1992 season, with four home games and four road games. The Blazers moved from Worcester to Boston and were rebranded as the Boston Blazers. The expansion Buffalo Bandits defeated the Philadelphia Wings 20–11 in their first ever sellout of 16,325 at Memorial Auditorium. It marked the second sellout in league history. The Bandits also defeated the Baltimore Thunder in front of a second sellout crowd, marking the first time a team sold out two games in the same season. The Bandits advanced to the league championship game by defeating the Detroit Turbos 19–16 to win the National Division crown. The Philadelphia Wings defeated the Saints 8–6 to capture the American Division Championship. Buffalo defeated Philadelphia 11–10 in overtime, marking the first time an expansion team won the league title.

==== 1993 ====
Buffalo won their second consecutive championship with a 13–12 comeback victory over the Philadelphia Wings before 16,325 in the sold-out Memorial Auditorium. The Bandits kept their 18-game winning streak alive, the longest in professional sports at the time. Buffalo joined the Wings as the only team in league history to win back-to-back championships.

Business-wise, the League and the Players Association announced a three-year contract agreement and the league signed a six-year agreement with ESPN. The Pittsburgh Bulls folded after their fourth season, having never made the playoffs, bringing the league back to six teams going into 1994.

==== 1994 ====
ESPN2's first Monday night broadcast featured the Detroit Turbos against the Baltimore Thunder. The Philadelphia Wings denied the Buffalo Bandits a third consecutive championship by defeating the Bandits 26–15 in front of a sellout crowd of 16,284 at Memorial Auditorium. The win gave the Wings its third league championship, the most of any team. ESPN broadcast the game live from Buffalo, marking the first live telecast by ESPN of a league game.

After the season, the league announced that Rochester, New York, would be awarded an expansion team for the 1995 season, the Rochester Knighthawks. The team would effectively replace the Turbos, who folded after their sixth season, keeping the league at six teams.

==== 1995 ====
The expansion Rochester Knighthawks won their inaugural game 12–8 against the New York Saints at the War Memorial. Philadelphia broke the league's attendance record when 17,380 fans watched the Wings defeat the Baltimore Thunder in the regular season finale. The 1995 season marked the first time that Paul and Gary Gait played on different teams, with the former playing for Rochester and the latter for Philadelphia. The Philadelphia Wings won a second-consecutive and fourth overall championship by defeating the Knighthawks 15–14 in overtime.

After the season the league another expansion team, the Charlotte Cobras, who would play out of Charlotte, North Carolina.

==== 1996 ====
For 1996, the league schedule expanded to 10 games. A crowd of 16,818, the fourth largest in league history, watched the Wings defeat the Charlotte Cobras at CoreStates Spectrum in Philadelphia. The Cobras went on to post the first winless season in league history, and subsequently folded after only one year of play. The Wings advanced to their fifth consecutive league championship game by defeating the Boston Blazers 10–8 in the final MILL game to be played in their historic home arena. However, the Buffalo Bandits played spoiler to the Wings and denied them a third consecutive title, defeating Philadelphia 15–10 in the championship game in front of a sold-out Memorial Auditorium in Buffalo. The Bandits picked up their third championship, and said goodbye to their own arena at the end of the season.

==== 1997 ====
The 11th season opened with three games, including Rochester playing Buffalo at the Bandits' new home, the Marine Midland Arena, in front of a new league record crowd of 18,595 fans. The Rochester Knighthawks, coached by Barry Powless, claimed their first MILL championship in front of the second largest crowd in MILL history, 18,055, also played at the Marine Midland Arena, defeating the Bandits 15–12.

=== National Lacrosse League ===
NLL logo 1998–2016

In 1997, the Major Indoor Lacrosse League was renamed the National Lacrosse League, and announced that the schedule would be expanded from 10 to 12 games. In addition, the league welcomed two new expansion teams, the Syracuse Smash, based in Syracuse, New York, and the Ontario Raiders, based in Hamilton, Ontario, while the Boston Blazers folded after nine seasons. John Livsey Jr. was named as the first Commissioner of the NLL.

==== 1998 ====
The 1998 regular season schedule included six home and six road games for each team, with each team facing their six opponents twice during the regular season. In addition, the playoff format saw a best-of-three championship series with semifinal playoff action still taking place in a single-game elimination format, though sites of all post-season games were based on regular season record.

A blockbuster trade saw seven-time All-Pro Paul Gait go to the expansion Syracuse Smash in exchange for draft picks and player compensation. Reigning league MVP Gary Gait was sent to Baltimore in a blockbuster trade involving player and cash compensation.

The Philadelphia Wings swept the best-of-three Championship Series with 16–12 and 17–12 victories. The second game marked the first title game appearance by Baltimore since 1991, and the win was Philadelphia's fifth in franchise history. Wings goaltender Dallas Eliuk was named Championship Series MVP.

==== 1999 ====
In 1999, the Raiders moved to Toronto and were renamed the Toronto Rock. The Rock finished the season with a perfect home record, going a combined 8–0 (regular season and playoffs) after a 13–10 win over the Rochester Knighthawks in the championship game before a sellout crowd of 15,691 at Maple Leaf Gardens. The game was televised throughout Canada by CTV SportsNet, and in the United States on ESPN2.

After the season, it was announced that the charter franchise Baltimore Thunder would move to Pittsburgh and become the Pittsburgh CrosseFire. In addition, the Albany Attack, based in Albany, New York, joined the NLL as an expansion team, bringing the league to eight teams ahead of the 2000 season for the first time.

==== 2000 ====
18,911 fans watched the Philadelphia Wings battle the Pittsburgh CrosseFire. Pittsburgh won the game 14–8 in front of a new record NLL crowd. The Toronto Rock won their second consecutive championship when Kaleb Toth beat Knighthawks goaltender Pat O'Toole with 1.1 seconds remaining in regulation time of the title match to give the Rock a 14–13 victory. Considered to be among the best lacrosse games ever played, the 2000 Final was the last sporting event to be held in the historic Maple Leaf Gardens.

After the season, the league expanded again, with former Commissioner John Livsey leading the establishment of the Columbus Landsharks in Columbus, Ohio. In addition, the Smash relocated north of the border and became the Ottawa Rebel, after three straight last place finishes, while the CrosseFire moved to Washington, D.C., and became the Washington Power. Jim Jennings was named the new Commissioner and announced that league headquarters would be relocated from Buffalo to Lyndhurst, New Jersey.

==== 2001 ====
In front of the league's largest crowd in history, the Philadelphia Wings won their sixth league championship with a 9–8 win over the Toronto Rock at the Air Canada Centre in front of 19,409 fans. Wings goaltender Dallas Eliuk was named Most Valuable Player.

The league announced a major expansion after the season, awarding new franchises to Montreal, New Jersey, Calgary, and Vancouver for the 2002. This would take the league from nine to thirteen teams, more than three times the number of teams that played the inaugural season in 1987. The expansion teams were the Montreal Express, the New Jersey Storm, the Calgary Roughnecks, and the Vancouver Ravens.

==== 2002 ====
With thirteen teams, the league established a divisional format with Eastern, Central, and Northern divisions. The Vancouver Ravens played their inaugural home game at General Motors Place in Vancouver. The Ravens defeated the Toronto Rock 13–12 in front of a crowd of 13,772, the largest to attend the first home game of an expansion franchise. The Albany Attack hosted the Rock in the 2002 Final, with the Rock defeating the Attack by a score of 13–12 to capture their third title in four seasons. 9,289 fans watched the game at the Pepsi Arena in Albany. Toronto forward Colin Doyle was voted Championship Game MVP, scoring three goals and one assist.

After the season, the league announced another relocation of the Washington Power franchise, now under new ownership in Denver. The team was bought by Kroenke Sports Enterprises, who also owned the Colorado Avalanche, Denver Nuggets, and the Pepsi Center, where the new Colorado Mammoth would host games. The new team marked the league's first U.S. team west of the Mississippi River. In addition, the Montreal Express suspended operations after just one season of play.

==== 2003 ====
The Colorado Mammoth played their inaugural home game at Pepsi Center in Denver. The Mammoth won 13–12 in double overtime against the Toronto Rock in front of 16,121 fans. The crowd broke the record for an inaugural home game attendance. The Mammoth also defeated the New York Saints by a score of 19–13 in front of a sellout of 18,207 fans, the first of two sellouts in Denver that season. The Mammoth averaged over 16,000 fans per game, second only to Toronto.

The Rochester Knighthawks hosted the Toronto Rock in the 2003 Champion's Cup Final. The Rock defeated the Knighthawks by a score of 8–6 to capture their fourth title in five seasons. 11,051 fans attended the game at the Blue Cross Arena in Rochester. Toronto goalie Bob Watson earned Championship Game MVP honors with his 40 saves.

The off-season was a tumultuous one for the NLL. The Ottawa Rebel joined the Montreal Express in suspending operations, while the New York Saints folded altogether after sixteen seasons. There were also three relocations: the Columbus Landsharks moved to Glendale and became the Arizona Sting; the New Jersey Storm moved to southern California and became the Anaheim Storm; and the Albany Attack moved to northern California and became the San Jose Stealth. This led to a new divisional alignment, with the league opting for a two-division, East/West format.

==== 2004 ====
For 2004, the new Western Division consisted of Anaheim, Arizona, Calgary, Colorado, San Jose, and Vancouver, while the Eastern Division consisted of Buffalo, Philadelphia, Rochester, and Toronto. The top three teams in each division would earn playoff berths with the division champions receiving byes. The second and third-place finishers would face each other in the opening round with the winners facing their respective division champions in the semi-final round. The semi-final winners (East vs. West) would meet in the 2004 Champions' Cup Final with the higher seed hosting. Fox Sports Net became the league's new national broadcast partner in the United States. Fox Sports Net carried nine regular-season game broadcasts spread across the schedule to over 50 million homes, along with the 2004 All-Star Game on February 22, 2004.

The Arizona Sting played their inaugural home game at the new Glendale Arena in Arizona, the first event ever held inside the arena. The Sting defeated the Vancouver Ravens by a score of 16–12 in front of 12,789 fans. The Colorado Mammoth hosted a sellout crowd of 18,305 at Pepsi Center in a 14–13 loss to the Calgary Roughnecks, the first of five Mammoth sellout crowds on the season. The 2004 All-Star Game was played in front of 16,742 fans at Pepsi Center in Denver, the largest All-Star Game crowd in league history. The East Division All-Stars defeated the West Division All-Stars by a score of 19–15.

The Calgary Roughnecks won their first Champion's Cup by defeating the Buffalo Bandits 14–11 at Pengrowth Saddledome in Calgary in front of 19,289 fans. The sellout crowd was the second highest single game attendance total in NLL history.

The collective bargaining agreement (CBA) between the league and players' association expired at the end of the season, necessitating negotiations for a new agreement. The Vancouver Ravens suspended operations after three seasons, while the owners of the Minnesota Wild purchased the dormant Montreal Express franchise and relocated it to Saint Paul, calling the team the Minnesota Swarm.

==== 2005 ====
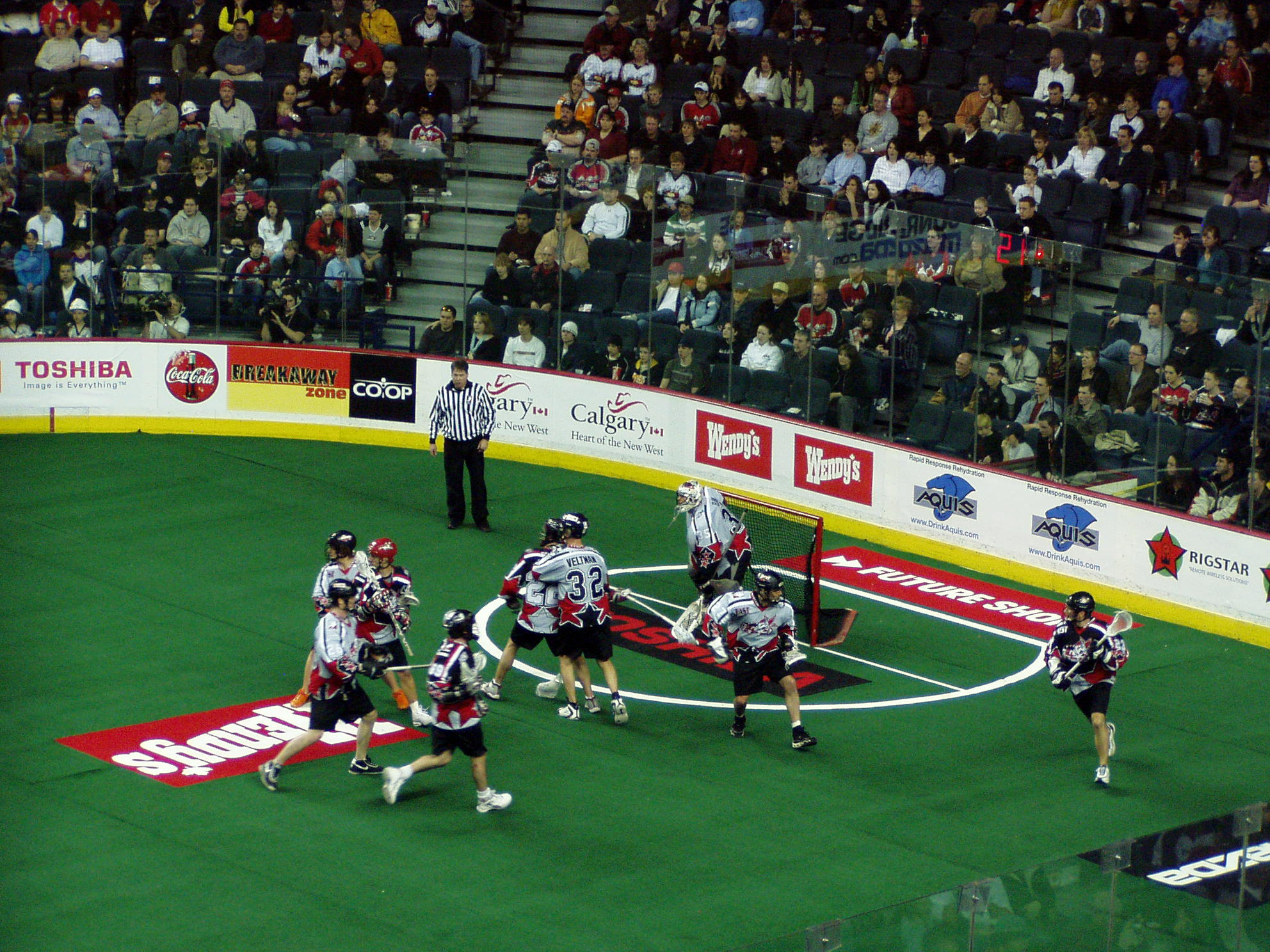
2005 NLL All-Star Game, Calgary, Alberta.

The protracted negotiations over a new CBA threatened to encroach upon or even cancel the 2005 season; however, the league announced a new 3-year CBA with the Player's Association (PLPA) in October, allowing the season to porceed.

A new preseason attendance record was set as 14,084 fans came to the Xcel Energy Center in St. Paul for the first home exhibition game of the expansion Minnesota Swarm. The game marked the first professional lacrosse game ever played in the state of Minnesota.

The National Lacrosse League All-Star Game aired live on NBC at 2 PM Eastern. The game became the first live broadcast of lacrosse on national U.S. network television. The game was also televised in Canada on The Score, and internationally via CNBC International, CNBC Asia, and on Armed Forces Network. The East Division defeated the West Division 11–10 in overtime in front of 11,511 fans at Pengrowth Saddledome in Calgary.

The Gait brothers were reunited when Paul ended his retirement, signing with the Colorado Mammoth and re-joining brother and Mammoth captain Gary.

The 2005 NLL Championship Game was played in front of a record 19,432 fans at the Air Canada Centre in Toronto and in front of a national network television audience in the US on NBC and in Canada on the Score. The Toronto Rock defeated the Arizona Sting 19–13, capturing their fifth title in seven seasons, capping a dominant run for the team and pulling within one title of the Philadelphia Wings' six. Colin Doyle was named MVP of the game after leading the Rock with five goals and three assists.

After the season, the Anaheim Storm folded after two years in California. However, the dormant Ottawa Rebel franchise was purchased and relocated to Edmonton by Bruce Urban, where the team was called the Edmonton Rush. In addition, the NLL awarded an expansion franchise to Portland, Oregon, which would be known as the Portland LumberJax, and which brought the league up to eleven teams.

The league also announced the establishment of the National Lacrosse League Hall of Fame. The Hall opened with five charter members who made contributions to the league and the sport of lacrosse: league founders Russ Cline and Chris Fritz; players Paul and Gary Gait; and the late Les Bartley, the coach with the most wins in league history.

The NLL and Reebok announced a multi-year exclusive partnership in which all NLL players would use Reebok equipment and would be exclusively outfitted in the brand's footwear and apparel. The partnership made the brand the official equipment, uniform, and footwear provider of the league.

==== 2006 ====
The Edmonton Rush played their inaugural game and home opener in front of 11,385 fans at Rexall Place in Edmonton, Alberta, losing 10–9 in overtime to the San Jose Stealth, the second time an expansion team forced overtime in their inaugural game.

The 2006 National Lacrosse League All-Star Game was held at the Air Canada Centre in Toronto. The West Division defeated the East Division 14–13 in front of 15,924 fans. Calgary Roughnecks forward Lewis Ratcliff scored the game-winning goal with 4.4 seconds remaining. Ratcliff was named the Game MVP. The league finished its 20th season by setting an all-time single season attendance mark, reaching a total of 1,037,147 fans for the 2006 season, which included 88 regular-season games, six playoff games, and the All-Star Game.

The Colorado Mammoth defeated the Buffalo Bandits 16–9 in front of 16,104 fans at HSBC Arena in Buffalo to secure the first championship in team history. Mammoth forward Gavin Prout was named game MVP, scoring four goals and adding three assists for seven points in the win.

After the season, the NLL announced two new expansion franchises for the 2007 season: a return to New York City with the New York Titans, and the first team in Chicago in the Chicago Shamrox. This brought the league back to thirteen teams for the first time since 2002.

==== 2007 ====
The expansion New York Titans played their home opener at Madison Square Garden, defeating the expansion Chicago Shamrox 11–9 in front of 13,127 fans. The Eastern Division defeated the Western Division 20–16 in front of 12,856 fans at Rose Garden in Portland in the 2007 All-Star Game. Buffalo Bandits forward Mark Steenhuis was named the game's Most Valuable Player becoming the first player in NLL history to win two All-Star Game MVP honors.

The NLL reached a milestone in 2007 as the league plays its 1,000th regular season game when the Minnesota Swarm hosted the Colorado Mammoth, with the Mammoth winning 11–9.

The Rochester Knighthawks defeated the Arizona Sting 13–11 in the 2007 Championship final. John Grant was named Championship Game MVP with a three-goal/five-assist performance. The victory marked the first time that Rochester had won the title since 1997.

After the season, the NLL reached a new seven-year CBA with the players' union. However, negotiations were protracted and threatened the 2008 season, to the extent that the Arizona Sting and a new Boston expansion franchise, reviving the Blazers name, announced that they would pause operations until 2009. As such, only twelve teams would compete in 2008.

==== 2008 ====
John Tavares broke Gary Gait's all-time goal scoring record in 2008. Tavares, who had already captured the all-time points and assists records, notched his record-breaking 597th career goal in the third quarter of Buffalo's 17–13 victory over New York. Philadelphia Forward Athan Iannucci broke Gary Gait's single season scoring record of 61 goals. He went on to finish the season with 71 goals.

The Buffalo Bandits defeated the Portland LumberJax by the score of 14–13 in the 2008 Championship game at HSBC Arena. The event, which aired nationally on ESPN2, drew a sellout crowd of 18,690 fans. Mark Steenhuis captured the game's MVP honors with five goals and one assist. The Toronto Rock and Rochester Knighthawks both missed the playoffs for the first time in either franchise's history.

==== 2009 ====
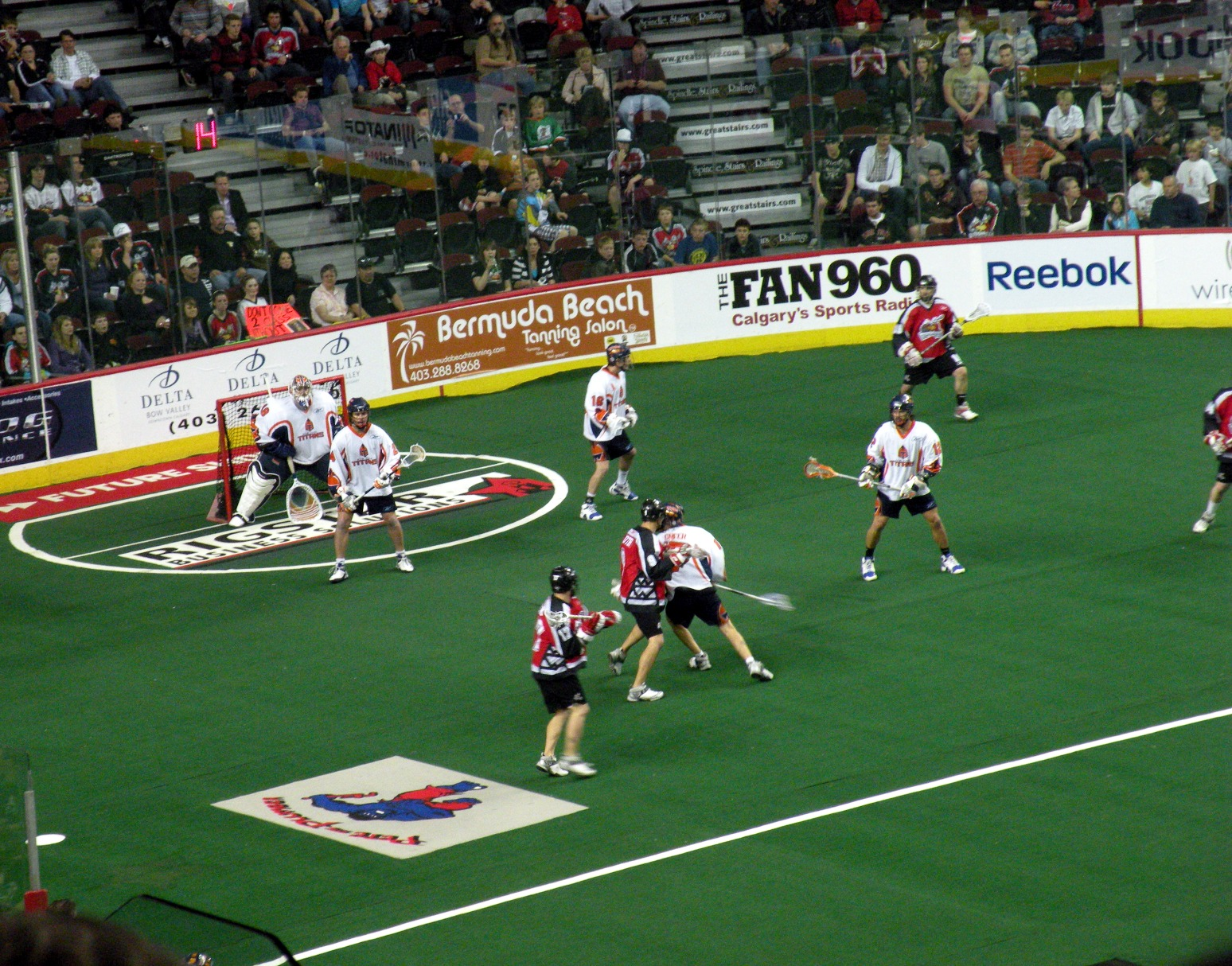
The New York Titans defend against the Calgary Roughnecks during the 2009 NLL Championship game, in Calgary.

The Arizona Sting and Boston Blazers were both expected to re-join the league for the 2009 season. While the Blazers did so, the Sting instead folded, and its players were dispersed in a dispersal draft. Moreover, the Chicago Shamrox folded after just two seasons, failing to make the playoffs either year. The league also announced the addition of instant replay for officials to review disputed goals and crease violations during games. George Daniel was named new league Commissioner.

Calgary won its second championship, defeating New York 12–10 in front of a crowd of 13,042 at Pengrowth Saddledome. Josh Sanderson was named Championship Game MVP, finishing with two goals and three assists.

After the season, the San Jose Stealth announced that they were relocating to Everett, where they would be known as the Washington Stealth. The New York Titans, also relocated, moving to Florida and becoming the Orlando Titans. Finally, the Portland LumberJax folded after four seasons of play.

==== 2010 ====
The Washington Stealth won the championship in its first season in its new home, defeating the Toronto Rock 15–11 in front of a crowd of 8,609 at Comcast Arena. Lewis Ratcliff was named Championship Game MVP.

After the season, the Orlando Titans folded after just one season in Florida.

==== 2011 ====
2011 marked the 25th season for the NLL. The Toronto Rock won its record-tying sixth championship, tying the Philadelphia Wings, by defeating the Washington Stealth 8–7 in front of a crowd of 8,609 at Air Canada Centre. Bob Watson was named Championship Game MVP. After the season, the latest incarnation of the Boston Blazers announced that it was folding after just three seasons, bringing the league down below ten teams for the first time since 2001, where it would stay until 2019.

==== 2012 ====
The Rochester Knighthawks won its third championship, defeating the Edmonton Rush 9–6 in front of a crowd of 9,277 at Blue Cross Arena. Cody Jamieson was named Championship Game MVP. For the first time since 1992, there was no off-season team movement in 2012.

==== 2013 ====
The Rochester Knighthawks won its second-consecutive and fourth overall championship, defeating the Washington Stealth 11–10 in front of a crowd of 5,200 at Langley Events Centre. Cody Jamieson was named Championship Game MVP. After the season, the Stealth announced that they would be re-locating north of the border to become the Vancouver Stealth, bringing the NLL back to British Columbia for the first time since 2004.

==== 2014 ====
The Rochester Knighthawks won a third-consecutive and fifth overall championship in 2014, defeating Calgary Roughnecks 2–1 in the final series. Game 1 was an 11–7 victory for the Roughnecks in front of a crowd of 16,541 at Scotiabank Saddledome. The Knighthawks won game 2, 16–10, and clinched game 3, 3–2, in front of a crowd of 9,188 at Blue Cross Arena. Dan Dawson was named Championship Game MVP.

After the season, the Philadelphia Wings were purchased and moved to Connecticut, where they were renamed the New England Black Wolves, ending a run of 28 seasons for the Wings in Philadelphia.

==== 2015 ====
The Edmonton Rush won its first championship in 2015, defeating the Toronto Rock 2–0 in the final series. The Rush won game 1, 15–9 in front of a crowd of 9,257 at Air Canada Centre. Game 2 was an 11–10 victory in front of a crowd of 12,275 at Rexall Place. Mark Matthews was named Championship Game MVP. However, the Rush announced after the season that, unable to come to a new arena-lease agreement, the team would be relocating to Saskatoon, where it was renamed the Saskatchewan Rush. In addition, the Minnesota Swarm were relocated to Atlanta and renamed the Georgia Swarm.

==== 2016 ====
Nick Sakiewicz was appointed the 5th Commissioner of the NLL ahead of the 2016 season.

The Rush won its second-consecutive Champion's Cup and its first after relocating to Saskatchewan, defeating the Buffalo Bandits 2–0 in the final series. Game 1 finished 11–9, in front of a crowd of 12,692 at First Niagara Center. Game 2 finished 11–10 in front of a crowd of 15,182 at SaskTel Centre. Aaron Bold was named Championship Game MVP.

==== 2017 ====
In 2017, the Georgia Swarm won its first championship in just its second season in Georgia, defeating the Saskatchewan Rush 2–0 in the final series. It was the third straight year that the Rush made the finals. Game 1 was an 18–14 result in front of a crowd of 7,642 at Infinite Energy Arena. Game 2 finished 15–14 in front of a crowd of 14,264 at SaskTel Centre. Lyle Thompson was named Championship Game MVP.

==== 2018 ====
In 2018, the Saskatchewan Rush re-gained the title, winning the first National Lacrosse League Cup, which replaced the Champion's Cup, defeating the Rochester Knighthawks 2–1 in the final series. It was the third title in four seasons for the Rush with the team making the final all four seasons.

After the season, the league announced two expansion franchises that would begin play in 2019: a new Philadelphia Wings franchise along with a new southern California team, the San Diego Seals. This brought the league back to eleven teams. In addition, the league announced two further expansion teams that would begin play for the 2020 season. First, the New York Riptide would play out of the Saints' old home in Uniondale. Secondly, while Knighthawks owner Curt Styres announced that he would be moving the franchise from Rochester to Halifax after the 2019 season, the league awarded a new expansion franchise for Rochester to the owners of the Buffalo Sabres, Pegula Sports and Entertainment, to immediately replace the departing Knighthawks.

==== 2019 ====
The 2019 NLL season was delayed when the Professional Lacrosse Players Association went on strike shortly before training camp was set to begin over negotiations for a new CBA. On November 15, 2018, the league announced that a counter-proposal submitted by the Players Association had been rejected. Subsequently, the league announced that all games to be played in the first two weeks of the season were canceled. On November 24, the NLL and the PLPA reached a new five-year collective bargaining agreement. The first week of the season began on December 15 and the league announced each team will still play the standard 18 game schedule.

The league kicked off its first game of the season on December 15, with the Wings returning to Philadelphia. The Wings fell to the visiting Buffalo Bandits 17–15. On December 22, the San Diego Seals played their first ever game, upsetting the Colorado Mammoth at the Pepsi Center, 17–12. The Calgary Roughnecks won their third title, defeating Buffalo 2–0 in the final series.

==== 2020 ====
Three teams debuted in the 2020 season. The original Knighthawks completed their move to Nova Scotia and were re-branded the Halifax Thunderbirds; the departing K-Hawks were replaced by the new expansion Rochester Knighthawks; and the New York Riptide also began play. This brought the league to thirteen teams for the first time since 2007.

On March 13, 2020, league play was indefinitely suspended due to the COVID-19 pandemic. At the time teams had played 10 to 14 matches. On June 4, the league announced that the rest of the season and the playoffs were canceled due to the pandemic, and that attention would turn to organizing the 2021 season. However, this development did not stop league business, and in July 2020, a new expansion team was awarded to Fort Worth, Texas. The new team would be known as the Panther City Lacrosse Club.

On February 3, 2021, the 2021 season was also canceled due to logistical issues and uncertainties relating to the pandemic, including travel restrictions and quarantine requirements. The NLL stated that it was turning its attention to planning for the 2022 season. That spring, the New England Black Wolves announced that they would be relocating to New York and would be renamed the Albany FireWolves, bringing the NLL back to Albany for the first time since 2003. In addition, the league awarded another expansion franchise, this one to Las Vegas, to begin play in 2023. This new team would become the Las Vegas Desert Dogs.

==== 2022 ====
The NLL returned on December 3, 2021, marking the beginning of the 2022 season, the league's 35th, and the first game action in nearly two years. The fourteen teams, the highest number ever for the league, played a full 18-game schedule. The return was successful, and the season ended with the Colorado Mammoth defeating the Buffalo Bandits on June 18, 2022, winning the championship series 2 games to 1. The season marked the debut of Panther City and the FireWolves.

==== 2023 ====
The 2023 season began December 2, 2022, and ended with the Buffalo Bandits avenging their championship series loss from the previous season, defeating the Colorado Mammoth on June 3, 3, 2023, to win the series 2 games to 1. This was the inaugural season for the Las Vegas Desert Dogs, bringing the number of teams to fifteen. The 2023 NLL Stadium Showdown, the first outdoor NLL game, was held on March 4 at Snapdragon Stadium in San Diego, between the Desert Dogs and the San Diego Seals; the Seals won the game 15–12.

==== 2024 ====
The 2024 season began on December 1, 2023, and ended on May 18, 2024, with the Buffalo Bandits sweeping the Albany FireWolves 2–0 in the NLL Finals series to claim their sixth league title. This season introduced "NLL Unboxed", an initiative to promote lacrosse among youth via branded "lacrosse communities" in strategic markets that do not have NLL teams (see NLL Unboxed section below).

On December 29, 2023, Canadian referee Carmen Massel became the first woman to be part of the officiating crew in a game in the NLL. She was the shot clock operator for the San Diego Seals vs. Rochester Knighthawks game in San Diego.

On February 21, 2024, the NLL announced that the New York Riptide would relocate to Ottawa, and will be renamed the Ottawa Black Bears.

==== 2025 ====
Ahead of the 2025 season, the Panther City Lacrosse Club ceased operations after three seasons of play, returning the league to 14 teams. The Buffalo Bandits started off with a 7–0 record but the winning streak was ended by the San Diego Seals. The Buffalo Bandits became the second team ever to win three championships in a row. The Bandits defeated the Saskatchewan Rush 2–1 in the series with game 1 being 12–10 Bandits, 11–10 Rush, and 15–6 Bandits. Buffalo now leads the league with championships with seven total, additionally Matt Vinc is now the only player to have a three peat on two different teams.

==== 2026 ====
Ahead of the 2026 season, the Albany FireWolves relocated to Oshawa, Ontario. They were temporarily called the FireWolves Lacrosse Club, before being officially renaming to the Oshawa FireWolves on September 9, 2025. On March 30, 2026, the Philadelphia Wings announced that they would cease operations after the end of the 2026 season, bringing the league to 13 teams.

=== Commissioners ===
1. Darrel Russell, 1987–1997
2. John Livsey Jr, 1997–2000
3. Jim Jennings, 2000–2009
4. George Daniel, 2009–2015
5. Nick Sakiewicz, 2016–2022
6. Brett Frood, 2022–present

== Championship history ==
Team	Championships	Years	Runner-ups	Runner-up years
Buffalo Bandits	7	1992, 1993, 1996, 2008, 2023, 2024, 2025	7	1994, 1997, 2004, 2006, 2016, 2019, 2022
Toronto Rock	7	1999, 2000, 2002, 2003, 2005, 2011, 2026	3	2001, 2010, 2015
Philadelphia Wings^{(Original)}/Albany FireWolves_{(Now Oshawa FireWolves)}	6	1989, 1990, 1994, 1995, 1998, 2001	4	1992, 1993, 1996, 2024
Rochester Knighthawks^{(Original)}_{(Now Halifax Thunderbirds)}	5	1997, 2007, 2012, 2013, 2014	6	1995, 1999, 2000, 2003, 2018, 2026
Edmonton/Saskatchewan Rush	3	2015, 2016, 2018	3	2012, 2017, 2025
Calgary Roughnecks	3	2004, 2009, 2019	1	2014
Baltimore Thunder/Colorado Mammoth	3	1987, 2006, 2022	3	1991, 1998, 2023
New Jersey/New York Saints _{(Folded in 2003)}	1	1988	1	1989
Detroit Turbos _{(Folded in 1994)}	1	1991	0	—
Albany Attack/Washington Stealth _{(Now Vancouver Warriors)}	1	2010	3	2002, 2011, 2013
Georgia Swarm	1	2017	0	—
Washington Wave _{(Folded in 1989)}	0	—	2	1987, 1988
Arizona Sting _{(Folded in 2009)}	0	—	2	2005, 2007
New England Blazers _{(Folded in 1991)}	0	—	1	1990
Portland LumberJax _{(Folded in 2009)}	0	—	1	2008
New York Titans _{(Folded in 2009)}	0	—	1	2009

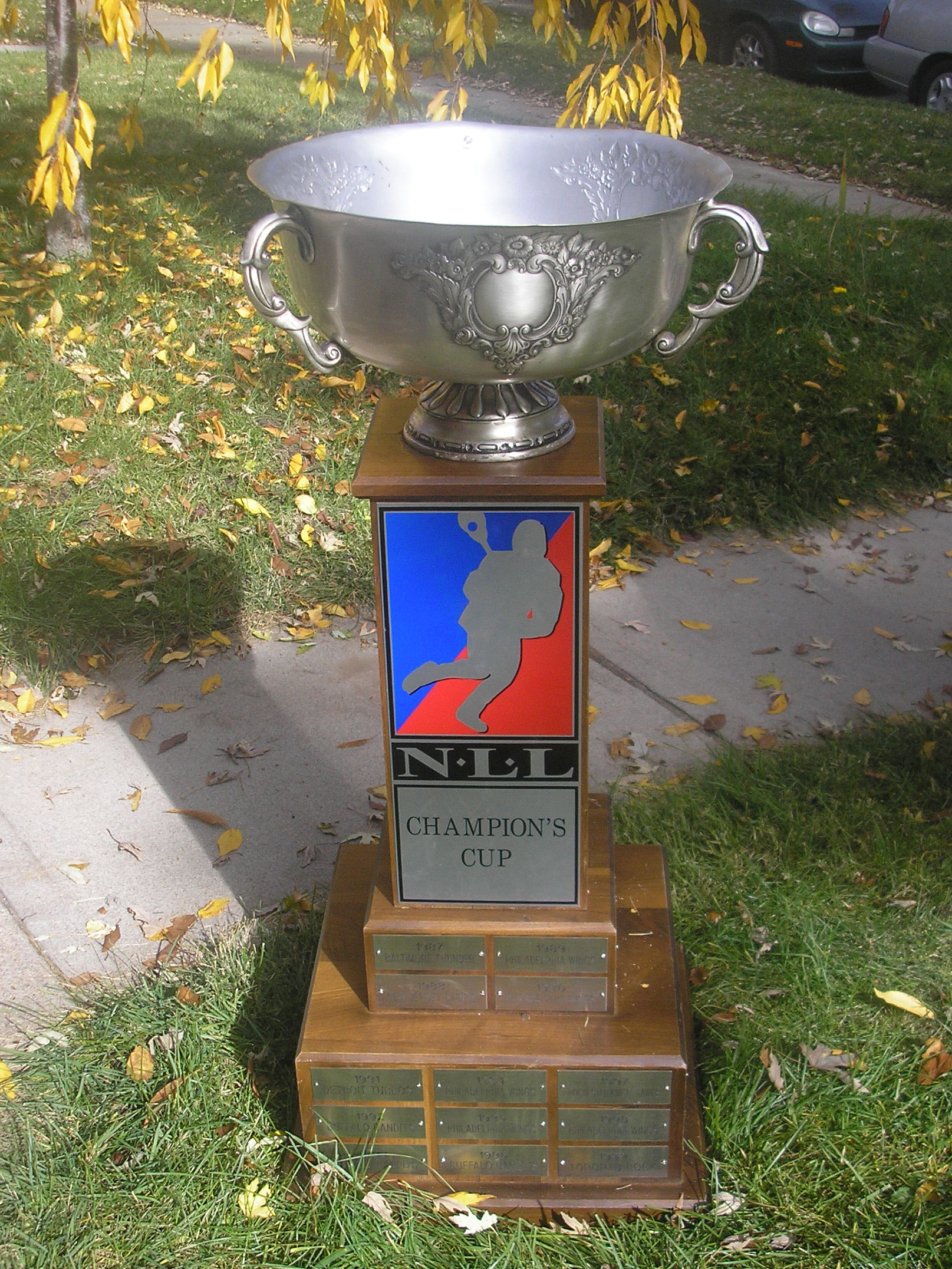
The Champion's Cup was awarded to the NLL Champion from 1998 to 2017

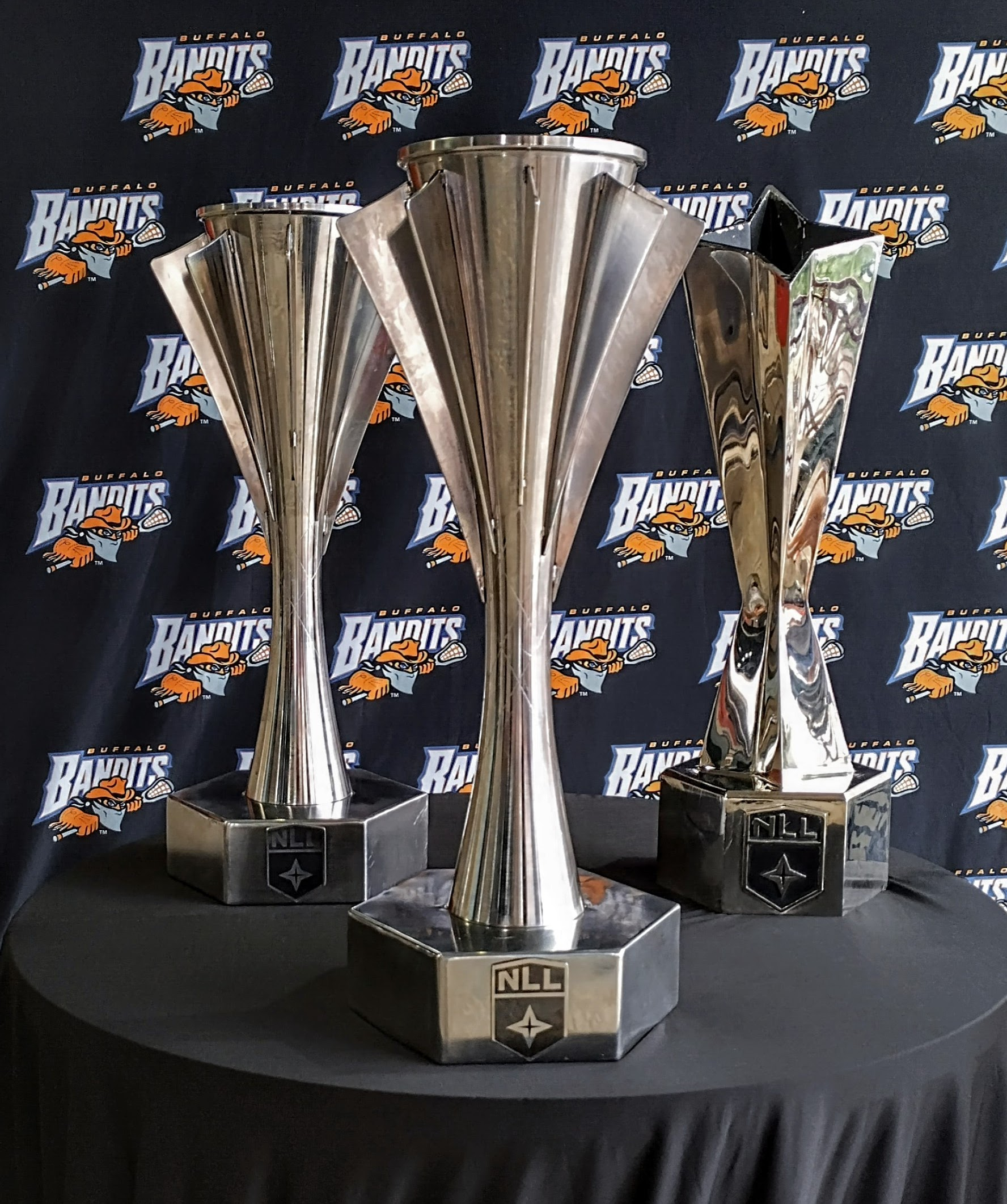
The National Lacrosse League Cup replaced the Champion's Cup in 2018. The design on the right was used through 2023.

Year	Winner	Runner-up	Score	Series
Eagle Pro Box Lacrosse League
1987	Baltimore Thunder	Washington Wave	11–10	
1988	New Jersey Saints	Washington Wave	17–16	
Major Indoor Lacrosse League
1989	Philadelphia Wings	New York Saints	11–10	
1990	Philadelphia Wings	New England Blazers	17–7	
1991	Detroit Turbos	Baltimore Thunder	14–12	
1992	Buffalo Bandits	Philadelphia Wings	11–10^{OT}	
1993	Buffalo Bandits	Philadelphia Wings	13–12	
1994	Philadelphia Wings	Buffalo Bandits	26–15	
1995	Philadelphia Wings	Rochester Knighthawks	15–14^{OT}	
1996	Buffalo Bandits	Philadelphia Wings	15–10	
1997	Rochester Knighthawks	Buffalo Bandits	15–12	
National Lacrosse League
1998	Philadelphia Wings	Baltimore Thunder		2–0
1999	Toronto Rock	Rochester Knighthawks	13–10	
2000	Toronto Rock	Rochester Knighthawks	14–13	
2001	Philadelphia Wings	Toronto Rock	9–8	
2002	Toronto Rock	Albany Attack	13–12	
2003	Toronto Rock	Rochester Knighthawks	8–6	
2004	Calgary Roughnecks	Buffalo Bandits	14–11	
2005	Toronto Rock	Arizona Sting	19–13	
2006	Colorado Mammoth	Buffalo Bandits	16–9	
2007	Rochester Knighthawks	Arizona Sting	13–11	
2008	Buffalo Bandits	Portland LumberJax	14–13	
2009	Calgary Roughnecks	New York Titans	12–10	
2010	Washington Stealth	Toronto Rock	15–11	
2011	Toronto Rock	Washington Stealth	8–7	
2012	Rochester Knighthawks	Edmonton Rush	9–6	
2013	Rochester Knighthawks	Washington Stealth	11–10	
2014	Rochester Knighthawks	Calgary Roughnecks		2–1
2015	Edmonton Rush	Toronto Rock		2–0
2016	Saskatchewan Rush	Buffalo Bandits		2–0
2017	Georgia Swarm	Saskatchewan Rush		2–0
2018	Saskatchewan Rush	Rochester Knighthawks		2–1
2019	Calgary Roughnecks	Buffalo Bandits		2–0
2020	Season suspended due to COVID-19 pandemic.			
2021	Season canceled due to COVID-19 pandemic.			
2022	Colorado Mammoth	Buffalo Bandits		2–1
2023	Buffalo Bandits	Colorado Mammoth		2–1
2024	Buffalo Bandits	Albany FireWolves		2–0
2025	Buffalo Bandits	Saskatchewan Rush		2–1
2026	Toronto Rock	Halifax Thunderbirds		2–0

== Expansion and relocation ==
=== Name changes/relocations ===
- New Jersey Saints (1987–1988) → New York Saints (1989–2003) → Inactive
- New England Blazers (1989–1991) → Boston Blazers (1992–1997) → Inactive
- Baltimore Thunder (1987–1999) → Pittsburgh CrosseFire (2000) → Washington Power (2001–2002) → Colorado Mammoth (2003–current)
- Ontario Raiders (1998) → Toronto Rock (1999–current)
- Syracuse Smash (1998–2000) → Ottawa Rebel (2001–2003) → Inactive (2003–2005) → Edmonton Rush (2005–2015) → Saskatchewan Rush (2016–current)
- Albany Attack (1999–2003) → San Jose Stealth (2004–2009) → Washington Stealth (2010–2013) → Vancouver Stealth (2014–2018) → Vancouver Warriors (2018–current)
- Columbus Landsharks (2001–2003) → Arizona Sting (2004–2007) → Inactive
- Montreal Express (2002) → Inactive → Minnesota Swarm (2004–2015) → Georgia Swarm (2016–current)
- New Jersey Storm (2002–2003) → Anaheim Storm (2004–2005) → Inactive
- New York Titans (2007–2009) → Orlando Titans (2010) → Inactive
- Philadelphia Wings (1987–2014) → New England Black Wolves (2015–2021) → Albany FireWolves (2022–2025) → Oshawa FireWolves (2026–current)
- Rochester Knighthawks (1995–2019) → Halifax Thunderbirds (2020–current)
- New York Riptide (2018–2024) → Ottawa Black Bears (2025–2026) → Inactive

=== NLL Unboxed program ===
In November 2023, ahead of the 2024 season, the NLL launched an initiative known as "NLL Unboxed" (stylized as "NLL unBOXed"). It is designed to help promote the sport of lacrosse via youth and school programs in strategic markets that do not currently have NLL franchises, and build interest in the sport in the lead-up to lacrosse at the 2028 Summer Olympics. Each market in the program receives a branded "lacrosse community", which is used as part of promotion for the program and related activities.

As part of the program, the league began to hold "NLL Unboxed Series" games in the 2024 season, which are played in the market of one of the lacrosse communities in the program. The first of these games featured the Toronto Rock playing the New York Riptide at Place Bell in Laval, Quebec, marking the first NLL game played in the Montreal area since the Montreal Express' first and only season in 2002.

Lacrosse community	City	Years
Tampa Bay Snowbirds	Tampa, Florida	2023
St. Louis Rhythm/Howlers	St. Louis, Missouri	2023
Baltimore Ghost Crabs	Baltimore, Maryland	2023
Charlotte Cobras	Charlotte, North Carolina	2023
Minnesota Lake Dragons	Minneapolis-St. Paul, Minnesota	2023
Castors de Montréal	Montréal, Québec	2023
Utah Spikes	Salt Lake City, Utah	2023
Seattle Shipwrecks	Seattle, Washington	2023
Dallas OilCats	Dallas, Texas	2024
Indianapolis Checkers	Indianapolis, Indiana	2024
New Jersey Humpbacks	Newark, New Jersey	2024
Nashville Drumsticks	Nashville, Tennessee	2024
Portland Undercutters	Portland, Oregon	2024
Chicago Shamrocks	Chicago, Illinois	2024
Columbus Redtails	Columbus, Ohio	2024
Los Angeles Ligers	Los Angeles, California	2024
Miami Tormentas	Miami, Florida	2024
London Mounties	London, Ontario	2024
Edmonton Juice	Edmonton, Alberta	2024
Québec Harfangs	Quebec City, Québec	2024
Boston Wickies	Boston, Massachusetts	2024
Providence Vampires	Providence, Rhode Island	2024
Arizona Gilazillas	Phoenix, Arizona	2025
Austin Vibes	Austin, Texas	2025
Cincinnati Hammies	Cincinnati, Ohio	2025
Detroit Drive	Detroit, Michigan	2025
District Cherries	Washington, D.C.	2025
Jacksonville Swamp Pups	Jacksonville, Florida	2025
Long Island Moon Jellies	Long Island, New York	2025
Milwaukee Steel Steeds	Milwaukee, Wisconsin	2025
Raleigh Rascals	Raleigh, North Carolina	2025
Saint John Skippers	Saint John, New Brunswick	2025
San Francisco Gold	San Francisco, California	2025
Winnipeg Frostbite	Winnipeg, Manitoba	2025

== Attendance ==
Below is a table of the NLL regular season attendance.

Season	Teams	Games	Total attendance	Average attendance	Top team
1987	4	12	99,164	8,264	Philadelphia Wings (11,953)
1988	4	16	126,652	7,916	Philadelphia Wings (12,228)
1989	6	24	230,674	9,611	Philadelphia Wings (14,709)
1990	6	24	262,464	10,936	Philadelphia Wings (16,298)
1991	6	30	280,777	9,359	Philadelphia Wings (15,543)
1992	7	28	290,783	10,385	Philadelphia Wings (14,860)
1993	7	28	295,765	10,563	Buffalo Bandits (16,325)
1994	6	24	242,705	10,113	Buffalo Bandits (16,284)
1995	6	24	249,772	10,407	Philadelphia Wings (16,706)
1996	7	35	304,629	8,704	Buffalo Bandits (14,884)
1997	6	30	281,600	9,387	Buffalo Bandits (17,533)
1998	7	42	325,808	7,757	Philadelphia Wings (14,197)
1999	7	42	384,757	9,161	Philadelphia Wings (16,040)
2000	8	48	394,994	8,229	Philadelphia Wings (15,857)
2001	9	63	533,190	8,463	Toronto Rock (15,749)
2002	13	104	804,408	7,735	Toronto Rock (15,689)
2003	12	96	830,281	8,649	Toronto Rock (16,733)
2004	10	80	790,791	9,885	Colorado Mammoth (17,618)
2005	10	80	818,920	10,237	Toronto Rock (17,123)
2006	11	88	941,875	10,703	Colorado Mammoth (16,543)
2007	13	104	1,070,575	10,294	Colorado Mammoth (16,795)
2008	12	96	1,005,633	10,475	Colorado Mammoth (17,465)
2009	12	96	961,731	10,018	Buffalo Bandits (17,948)
2010	11	88	841,208	9,559	Buffalo Bandits (16,605)
2011	10	80	777,796	9,722	Buffalo Bandits (17,096)
2012	9	72	681,799	9,469	Buffalo Bandits (15,918)
2013	9	72	695,723	9,663	Colorado Mammoth (15,761)
2014	9	81	763,451	9,425	Colorado Mammoth (15,706)
2015	9	81	726,632	8,971	Colorado Mammoth (14,788)
2016	9	81	741,391	9,153	Buffalo Bandits (15,834)
2017	9	81	765,811	9,454	Buffalo Bandits (15,149)
2018	9	81	762,367	9,412	Saskatchewan Rush (14,639)
2019	11	99	950,083	9,597	Saskatchewan Rush (13,459)
2020	13	77	618,738	8,036	Buffalo Bandits (12,090)
2021 season not played due to the COVID-19 pandemic
2022	14	121	830,694	6,865	Buffalo Bandits (9,921)
2023	15	135	1,039,418	7,699	Buffalo Bandits (14,731)
2024	15	135	1,048,712	7,768	Buffalo Bandits (16,974)
2025	14	126	987,080	7,834	Buffalo Bandits (18,471)
2026	14	126	1,006,479	7,988	Buffalo Bandits (18,290)

Key
Record high
Record low

== National Lacrosse League Players' Association ==
The National Lacrosse League Players' Association (NLLPA), formerly the Professional Lacrosse Players' Association (PLPA), is the trade union of players in the NLL. The PLPA was founded in 1991 by Dave Succamore (a former Detroit Turbos player), Peter Schmitz (a former Boston Blazers player and president) and four other players from other teams with assistance by labor attorney Ronald L. Jaros. The union was organized to assist with missed work pay for players who miss their regular jobs for games; expanded expense reimbursement; more opportunities for promotional pay on top of their regular game salaries; more time for rookies to assess their initial contracts; game compensation for practice players; free agency; a standard grievance and arbitration process for fines and suspensions. Before the players' union was in place, injured players' medical bills were paid by the League through workers' compensation insurance in the states where teams were located.

== Media coverage ==
In the early 2000s, CNN Sports Illustrated aired NLL games regularly. The NLL had had its All-Star Games and Championship games on NBC in 2005 and ESPN2 in 2006.

In 2007, the NLL had a regularly scheduled "Game of the Week" on Versus. For the 2008 season, due to dispute between the Professional Lacrosse Players' Association and the NLL owners in completing the collective bargaining agreement, the "Game of the Week" on Versus was cancelled. Also in 2007, the NLL signed an agreement with Sirius Satellite Radio, who were the "Official Satellite Radio Partner". The pact included a "Game of the Week" as well as a weekly highlight show.

For the 2011 season, the NLL returned to Versus, beginning with coverage of the 2011 All-Star Game, followed by 6 weekly games, and 2 playoff games, one of these being the championship game. In the 2012 season, the rights shifted to CBS Sports Network, which carried a package of eight regular season games.

In 2012, the NLL reached an agreement with the YouTube channel The Lacrosse Network, with most games broadcast live on the channel, and all games available on-demand after their broadcast. For the 2016 season, the league moved to Fox Sports' streaming platform Fox Sports Go. Beginning with the 2016 division semifinals, the NLL introduced an in-house NLLTV service operated by NeuLion.

In the 2017 season, the NLL reached a two-season deal with Twitter to stream a weekly game, as well as playoff games and the Champion's Cup, via the social network's live streaming features. A separate deal was reached with CBS Sports Digital to stream games on its subscription platform SportsLive.

For the 2018–19 season, the league announced a broadcasting agreement with Turner Sports, under which its games would be streamed exclusively by B/R Live.

For the 2021–22 season, the NLL reached a new media rights agreement with ESPN Inc., under which all games would stream on ESPN+ in the United States, and at least 10 would air on an ESPN television channel. In Canada, the league also returned to TSN (which is minority-owned by ESPN) for the first time since 2016, airing a "game of the week" package focusing on its Canadian franchises, playoff games, and streaming of other games online on subscription platform TSN+. All other game broadcasts are produced in-house by the league, using a mix of on-site staff and REMI hubs (with Dome Productions, a joint venture between TSN's parent company Bell Media and rival Rogers Media, handling the hub for Canadian teams and other games broadcast by TSN).

For the 2026–27 season, the NLL reached a global streaming agreement with FloSports; all games will stream on the new FloLacrosse channel, while a weekly NLL Saturday Showcase and the finals will stream for free on the FAST channel FloSports Channel. The league also renewed with TSN to continue its NLL Friday Night package.

== Video games ==
Blast Lacrosse, a video game based on the NLL, was released on 23 May 2001. Developed by Sandbox Studios and published by Acclaim Entertainment, it was the first lacrosse video game and included all nine teams from the NLL's 15th season (2001).

On March 31, 2010, the NLL announced it had partnered with Crosse Studio and Triple B Games to develop NLL Lacrosse 2010 presented by Reebok Lacrosse. The game was released exclusively on Xbox 360 via Xbox Live Indie Games on April 23, 2010. Crosse Studio and Triple B Games developed Inside Lacrosse's College Lacrosse 2010 in 2009 before approaching the NLL to license their next game.

== Awards ==
- National Lacrosse League Weekly Awards
- National Lacrosse League Monthly Awards
- MVP Award
- Rookie of the Year Award
- Les Bartley Award (coach of the year)
- GM of the Year Award
- Executive of the Year Award
- Defensive Player of the Year Award
- Transition Player of the Year Award
- Goaltender of the Year Award
- Sportsmanship Award
- Tom Borrelli Award (writer of the year)

== See also ==
- Arena Lacrosse League, Canadian semi-professional box lacrosse league
- Premier Lacrosse League, American professional field lacrosse league
- List of professional sports teams in the United States and Canada
- Professional sports leagues in the United States
- List of National Lacrosse League venues
