= New England Blazers =

Former NLL professional box lacrosse team

- Sport: Box lacrosse
- Founded: 1989
- Last season: 1991
- League: Major Indoor Lacrosse League
- Division: National
- Team history: Boston Blazers (1992–1997)
- Location: Worcester, Massachusetts
- Championships: 0

The New England Blazers were a member of the Major Indoor Lacrosse League (MILL) from 1989 to 1991. They were based in Worcester, Massachusetts, playing at the Worcester Centrum. After the 1991 season, they moved to Boston, Massachusetts, becoming the Boston Blazers.

== All time Record ==
Season	Division	W-L	Finish	Home	Road	GF	GA	Coach	Playoffs
1989		1–7	5th	0–4	1–3	70	110	Ron Fraser	Missed playoffs
1990		6–2	1st	3–1	3–1	98	80	Ron Fraser	Lost Championship
1991	National	3–7	3rd	2–3	1–4	109	136	Ron Fraser	Missed playoffs
Total	3 seasons	10–16		5–8	5–8	277	326		

== Playoff Results ==
Season	Game	Visiting	Home
1990	Championship	Philadelphia 17	New England 9
