= 1988 Philadelphia Wings season =

1988 Philadelphia Wings
- League: Eagle Pro Box Lacrosse League
- Rank: 3rd
- 1988 record: 3–6
- Home record: 2–2
- Road record: 1–3
- Goals for: 97
- Goals against: 90
- General Manager: Mike French
- Coach: Steve Wey
- Arena: Wachovia Spectrum
- Average attendance: 12,000

The Philadelphia Wings were one of the original four franchises in the Eagle Pro Box Lacrosse League, joining the New Jersey Saints, Washington Wave, and Baltimore Thunder in 1987. The Wings were still in a growing phase in 1988 and recorded 3 wins and 6 losses that season. Once again, though, the team was able to draw in fans, with a home attendance of 48,910 (over 12,000 per game). Star player Mike French moved upstairs into the Wings' general manager's chair during the year.

== Game log ==
| # | Date | at/vs. | Opponent | Score | Attendance | Record |
|---|---|---|---|---|---|---|
| 1 | January 9, 1988 | at | Washington Wave | 13–14 | 6,624 | Loss |
| 2 | January 16, 1988 | vs. | Washington Wave | 10–11 | 13,814 | Loss |
| 3 | January 30, 1988 | vs. | Baltimore Thunder | 12–7 | 16,028 | Win |
| 4 | February 6, 1988 | vs. | New Jersey Saints | 7–10 | 9,064 | Loss |
| 5 | February 14, 1988 | at | Washington Wave | 12–13 | 6,683 | Loss |
| 6 | February 20, 1988 | vs. | Baltimore Thunder | 14–13 | 10,004 | Win |
| 7 | February 21, 1988 | at | New Jersey Saints | 12–13 | 6,427 | Loss |
| 8 | February 27, 1988 | at | Baltimore Thunder | 17–9 | 4,937 | Win |
| 9 (p) | March 6, 1988 | at | New Jersey Saints | 10–12 | 4,118 | Loss |

(p) – denotes playoff game

== 1988 Highlights ==
- The Wings drew more fans at home, 48,910 at the Spectrum, with their largest draw, 16,028 fans in a 12–7 victory against the New Jersey Saints.
- The team was able to acquire the services of Hall of Famers Brad Kotz and Tony Resch during the year.
- Kevin Bilger led the league in Save Percentage at 77.2%.

== Roster ==
| No. | | Position | Player |
|---|---|---|---|
| 30 | (United States) | Goalie | Bilger, Kevin (Maryland) |
| 99 | (United States) | Fwd | Bozel, Jeff (Loyola) |
| 5 | (United States) | Fwd | Carruthers, Scott (Drexel) |
| 10 | (United States) | Fwd | Conley, John (Towson) |
| – | (United States) | Fwd | Corrigan, George (Washington & Lee) |
| 15 | (United States) | Fwd | Danko, Paul (North Carolina) |
| 25 | (United States) | Fwd | Decico, Mark (Towson) |
| 77 | (United States) | Fwd | Delligatti, Lou (Towson) |
| 14 | (Canada) | Fwd | French, Paul (Virginia) |
| 12 | (United States) | Fwd | Grieves, Dick (Washington College) |
| 3 | (United States) | Fwd | Johnson, Mark |
| 11 | (United States) | Fwd | Lamon, Pat (Loyola) |

| No. | | Position | Player |
|---|---|---|---|
| 8 | (United States) | Fwd | Manley, Greg (Loyola) |
| 33 | (United States) | Fwd | Martin, Gary (Penn State) |
| – | (United States) | Fwd | McGeeney, John (UMBC) |
| 9 | (United States) | Fwd | McGrath, Steve (Washington & Lee) |
| 1 | (United States) | Goalie | Moschella, Mark (Drexel) |
| – | (United States) | Fwd | Page, Mike (Penn) |
| – | (United States) | Goalie | Pfeifer, Vinnie(University of Baltimore) |
| 34 | (United States) | Fwd | Resch, Tony (Yale) |
| 16 | (United States) | Fwd | Singleton, Tom (Loyola) |
| 21 | (United States) | Fwd | Tasker, Dave (Langara) |
| 2 | (United States) | Fwd | Tucker, John (Hopkins) |
| 24 | (United States) | Fwd | Wey, Steve (Hopkins) |

== See also ==
- Philadelphia Wings
- 1988 Eagle Pro Box Lacrosse League season
