= 1992 Philadelphia Wings season =

1992 Philadelphia Wings
- League: Major Indoor Lacrosse League
- Division: 2nd American
- 1992 record: 3–5
- Home record: 1–3
- Road record: 2–2
- Goals for: 106
- Goals against: 109
- Coach: Dave Evans
- Arena: Wachovia Spectrum

The 1992 Philadelphia Wings season marked the team's sixth season of operation.

== Game log ==
#	Date	at/vs.	Opponent	Score	Attendance	Record
1	January 11, 1992	vs.	Boston Blazers	6–9	15,176	Loss
2	January 24, 1992	at	Pittsburgh Bulls	9–14	6,803	Loss
3	February 2, 1992	vs.	New York Saints	8–9	13,697	Loss
4	February 8, 1992	at	Detroit Turbos	16–15	8,246	Win
5	February 14, 1992	vs.	Baltimore Thunder	16–12	13,814	Win
6	February 28, 1992	at	Buffalo Bandits	11–20	16,325	Loss
7	March 7, 1992	vs.	Pittsburgh Bulls	15–19	16,753	Loss
8	March 21, 1992	at	Baltimore Thunder	20–8	9,776	Win
9 (p)	April 4, 1992	at	New York Saints	8–6	9,678	Win
10(p)	April 11, 1992	vs.	Buffalo Bandits	10–11	13,187	Loss

(p) – denotes playoff game

== Roster ==
No.		Position	Player
30	(United States)	Fwd	Bates, Chris (Dartmouth)
7	(United States)	Fwd	Burt, Tom (Virginia)
10	(United States)	Fwd	Conley, John(Towson)
3	(United States)	Fwd	Deniken, Paul (Washington College)
44	(United States)	Fwd	Dirrigl, Bill (Syracuse)
1	(United States)	Goalie	Donnelly, Joe
35	(United States)	Goalie	Eliuk, Dallas
9	(United States)	Fwd	Flynn, Chris (Penn)
13	(United States)	Fwd	Fried, Ricky (UMBC)
8	(United States)	Fwd	Gabrielsen, Scott (Vermont)
4	(United States)	Fwd	Hahn, Mark
26	(United States)	Fwd	Hoynes, Rob
38	(United States)	Goalie	Maetche, Dwight

No.		Position	Player
33	(United States)	Fwd	Martin, Gary
12	(United States)	Fwd	McEvoy, John (Villanova)
99	(United States)	Fwd	Miller, Billy (Hobart)
20	(United States)	Fwd	Moore, Matt
5	(United States)	Fwd	Nostrant, John (Washington College)
11	(United States)	Fwd	Nugent, John
55	(United States)	Fwd	Panetta, Matt
34	(United States)	Fwd	Resch, Tony (Yale)
19	(United States)	Fwd	Shek, Rob (Towson)
2	(United States)	Fwd	Tucker, John (Hopkins)
6	(United States)	Fwd	Voelker, Bryan (Hopkins)
17	(United States)	Goalie	Warren, Chuck

== See also ==
- Philadelphia Wings
- 1992 MILL season
