= 1987 Philadelphia Wings season =

1987 Philadelphia Wings
- League: Eagle Pro Box Lacrosse League
- Rank: 2nd
- 1987 record: 3-4
- Home record: 2-1
- Road record: 1-2
- Goals for: 86
- Goals against: 82
- General Manager: David Huntley
- Coach: Steve Wey
- Arena: Wachovia Spectrum
- Average attendance: 10,972

Team leaders
- Goals: Mike French (14)
- Assists: John Tucker (14)
- Points: John Tucker (26)

The Philadelphia Wings were one of the original four franchises in the Eagle Pro Box Lacrosse League, joining the New Jersey Saints, Washington Wave, and Baltimore Thunder in 1987. While the Wings went only 3-4 that first season including a loss in the playoffs, they drew an average of almost 12,000 fans to their three 1987 regular season games.

Some of the early stars of those teams included Mike French, Hall of Fame college player at Cornell and a current team executive, as well as John Grant Sr., father of current NLL star John Grant Jr.

== Results ==
=== Game log ===
#	Date	at/vs.	Opponent	Score	Attendance	Record
1	January 10, 1987	at	New Jersey Saints	8 - 11	5,976	Loss
2	January 24, 1987	at	Baltimore Thunder	19 - 20	6,593	Loss
3	January 31, 1987	vs.	New Jersey Saints	17 - 11	14,189	Win
4	February 14, 1987	vs.	Washington Wave	15 - 12	10,088	Win
5	February 22, 1987	vs.	Baltimore Thunder	8 - 14	11,583	Loss
6	February 25, 1987	at	Washington Wave	19 - 14	8,100	Win
7(p)	March 8, 1987	vs.	Washington Wave	15 - 20	8,027	Loss

(p) - denotes playoff game

== 1987 Highlights ==
- Wings drew 43,887 fans at home at the Spectrum for an average of 10,972 per game.
- Hall of Famer Mike French led the league in scoring with 14 goals, 9 assists for 23 points in 6 games.
- Original Philadelphia Wings player John Grant Sr. contributed 4 goals, 10 assists for 14 points in 8 games.

== Roster ==
No.		Position	Player
30	(United States)	Goalie	Bilger, Kevin (Maryland)
5	(United States)	Fwd	Castle, James R. (Drexel/NC State)
23	(United States)	Fwd	Ciccarone, Henry (Johns Hopkins)
10	(United States)	Fwd	Conley, John (Towson)
15	(United States)	Fwd	Danko, Paul (North Carolina)
25	(United States)	Fwd	Decico, Mark (Towson)
17	(Canada)	Fwd	French, Mike (Cornell)
14	(Canada)	Fwd	French, Paul (Virginia)
12	(Canada)	Fwd	Grant, John
22	(United States)	Fwd	Growney, Scott (Trinity)
9	(United States)	Fwd	Hanley, Pat (Towson)
19	(United States)	Fwd	Harris, Jeff (Johns Hopkins)

No.		Position	Player
3	(United States)	Fwd	Johnson, Mark
6	(United States)	Fwd	Krumenacker, John (Johns Hopkins)
11	(United States)	Fwd	Lamon, Pat (Loyola)
8	(United States)	Fwd	Manley, Greg (Loyola)
1	(United States)	Goalie	Moschella, Mark (Drexel)
20	(United States)	Fwd	Powers, Bob (Towson)
13	(United States)	Fwd	Scott, Peter (Johns Hopkins)
16	(United States)	Fwd	Singleton, Tom (Loyola)
21	(United States)	Fwd	Tasker, Dave (Langara)
18	(United States)	Fwd	Townsend, Dennis (Johns Hopkins)
2	(United States)	Fwd	Tucker, John (Johns Hopkins)
7	(United States)	Fwd	Wey, Dennis (UMBC)
24	(United States)	Fwd	Wey, Steve (Johns Hopkins)

== See also ==
- Philadelphia Wings
- 1987 Eagle Pro Box Lacrosse League season
