= 2003 Philadelphia Wings season =

2003 Philadelphia Wings
- League: NLL
- Division: 2nd Eastern
- 2003 record: 8–8
- Home record: 6–2
- Road record: 2–6
- Goals for: 203
- Goals against: 209
- Coach: Adam Mueller
- Arena: Wachovia Center

The 2003 Philadelphia Wings season marked the team's seventeenth season of operation.

== Regular season ==
=== Conference standings ===
Central Division
P	Team	GP	W	L	PCT	GB	Home	Road	GF	GA	Diff	GF/GP	GA/GP
1	Rochester Knighthawks – xyz	16	12	4	.750	0.0	6–2	6–2	214	173	+41	13.38	10.81
2	Buffalo Bandits – x	16	12	4	.750	0.0	8–0	4–4	231	188	+43	14.44	11.75
3	Albany Attack	16	8	8	.500	4.0	4–4	4–4	198	191	+7	12.38	11.94
4	Columbus Landsharks	16	8	8	.500	4.0	4–4	4–4	184	203	−19	11.50	12.69

East Division
P	Team	GP	W	L	PCT	GB	Home	Road	GF	GA	Diff	GF/GP	GA/GP
1	Colorado Mammoth – xy	16	9	7	.562	0.0	6–2	3–5	226	223	+3	14.12	13.94
2	Philadelphia Wings	16	8	8	.500	1.0	6–2	2–6	203	209	−6	12.69	13.06
3	New York Saints	16	3	13	.188	6.0	2–6	1–7	198	239	−41	12.38	14.94
4	New Jersey Storm	16	3	13	.188	6.0	3–5	0–8	187	220	−33	11.69	13.75

North Division
P	Team	GP	W	L	PCT	GB	Home	Road	GF	GA	Diff	GF/GP	GA/GP
1	Toronto Rock – xy	16	11	5	.688	0.0	6–2	5–3	195	164	+31	12.19	10.25
2	Calgary Roughnecks – x	16	9	7	.562	2.0	6–2	3–5	209	207	+2	13.06	12.94
3	Vancouver Ravens – x	16	9	7	.562	2.0	5–3	4–4	208	196	+12	13.00	12.25
4	Ottawa Rebel	16	4	12	.250	7.0	3–5	1–7	174	214	−40	10.88	13.38

x: Clinched playoff berth; c: Clinched playoff berth by crossing over to another division; y: Clinched division; z: Clinched best regular season record; GP: Games Played
W: Wins; L: Losses; GB: Games back; PCT: Win percentage; Home: Record at Home; Road: Record on the Road; GF: Goals scored; GA: Goals allowed
Differential: Difference between goals scored and allowed; GF/GP: Average number of goals scored per game; GA/GP: Average number of goals allowed per game

=== Game log ===
Game	Date	Opponent	Location	Score	OT	Attendance	Record
1	January 3, 2003	@ Vancouver Ravens	GM Place	L 10–14			0–1
2	January 18, 2003	@ Colorado Mammoth	Pepsi Center	L 9–13			0–2
3	January 25, 2003	Colorado Mammoth	Wachovia Center	W 13–11		13,848	1–2
4	February 1, 2003	Toronto Rock	Wachovia Center	L 9–13			1–3
5	February 6, 2003	@ New Jersey Storm	Continental Airlines Arena	W 16–15			2–3
6	February 5, 2003	Rochester Knighthawks	Wachovia Center	L 9–12			2–4
7	February 15, 2003	@ Ottawa Rebel	Ottawa Civic Centre	L 9–11			2–5
8	February 22, 2003	New Jersey Storm	Wachovia Center	W 16–14		13,344	3–5
9	March 1, 2003	Columbus Landsharks	Wachovia Center	W 13–12			4–5
10	March 6, 2003	@ New York Saints	Nassau Veterans Memorial Coliseum	W 18–17	OT		5–5
11	March 8, 2003	New York Saints	Wachovia Center	W 15–14		12,863	6–5
12	March 15, 2003	Buffalo Bandits	Wachovia Center	W 15–12		15,097	7–5
13	March 21, 2003	@ Toronto Rock	Air Canada Centre	L 9–12			7–6
14	March 22, 2003	Calgary Roughnecks	Wachovia Center	W 19–13		15,689	8–6
15	April 4, 2003	@ Albany Attack	Pepsi Arena	L 13–14			8–7
16	April 12, 2003	@ Rochester Knighthawks	Blue Cross Arena	L 10–12			8–8

== Roster ==
No.		Position	Player
32	(United States)	Def	Barrett, Bryan
66	(United States)	Fwd	Bergey, Jake
32	(United States)	Def	Brzeski, Richard
16	(United States)	Def	Burke, Zachery
6	(United States)	Def	Cantabene, Paul
25	(Canada)	Def	Candy, Drew
17	(United States)	Fwd	Cromwell, Keith
35	(Canada)	Goalie	Eliuk, Dallas
	(Canada)	Def	Guindon, Andrew
7	(United States)	Fwd	Henderson, Tony
		Fwd	Klienmann, Randy
24	(United States)	Def	Jacobs, Peter

No.		Position	Player
42	(Canada)	Fwd	Marechek, Tom
	(Canada)	Def	Martin, Andrew
90	(Canada)	Fwd	Ratcliffe, Jeff
17	(United States)	Fwd	Ryan, Tom
55	(United States)	Def	Ruhle, Jeff
30	(United States)	Goalie	Schroeder, Nick
3	(United States)	Def	Slate, Tom
47	(United States)	Def	Spano, Jeff
9	(United States)	Fwd	Striebel, Matt
36	(United States)	Fwd	Tower, Brian
		Fwd	Wasik, Andrew

== See also ==
- Philadelphia Wings
- 2003 NLL season
