= 2004 Philadelphia Wings season =

2004 Philadelphia Wings
- League: NLL
- Division: 4th Eastern
- 2004 record: 7–9
- Home record: 3–5
- Road record: 4–4
- Goals for: 192
- Goals against: 198
- Coach: Adam Mueller
- Arena: Wachovia Center

The 2004 Philadelphia Wings season marked the team's eighteenth season of operation.

== Regular season ==
=== Conference standings ===
East Division
P	Team	GP	W	L	PCT	GB	Home	Road	GF	GA	Diff	GF/GP	GA/GP
1	Toronto Rock – xy	16	10	6	.625	0.0	5–3	5–3	202	176	+26	12.62	11.00
2	Rochester Knighthawks – x	16	8	8	.500	2.0	6–2	2–6	173	186	−13	10.81	11.62
3	Buffalo Bandits – x	16	8	8	.500	2.0	4–4	4–4	205	198	+7	12.81	12.38
4	Philadelphia Wings	16	7	9	.438	3.0	3–5	4–4	192	198	−6	12.00	12.38

West Division
P	Team	GP	W	L	PCT	GB	Home	Road	GF	GA	Diff	GF/GP	GA/GP
1	Colorado Mammoth – xyz	16	13	3	.812	0.0	7–1	6–2	223	173	+50	13.94	10.81
2	San Jose Stealth – x	16	11	5	.688	2.0	7–1	4–4	204	201	+3	12.75	12.56
3	Calgary Roughnecks – x	16	10	6	.625	3.0	4–4	6–2	214	187	+27	13.38	11.69
4	Arizona Sting	16	7	9	.438	6.0	6–2	1–7	200	208	−8	12.50	13.00
5	Vancouver Ravens	16	5	11	.312	8.0	3–5	2–6	188	213	−25	11.75	13.31
6	Anaheim Storm	16	1	15	.062	12.0	1–7	0–8	171	227	−56	10.69	14.19

x: Clinched playoff berth; c: Clinched playoff berth by crossing over to another division; y: Clinched division; z: Clinched best regular season record; GP: Games Played
W: Wins; L: Losses; GB: Games back; PCT: Win percentage; Home: Record at Home; Road: Record on the Road; GF: Goals scored; GA: Goals allowed
Differential: Difference between goals scored and allowed; GF/GP: Average number of goals scored per game; GA/GP: Average number of goals allowed per game

=== Game log ===
Game	Date	Opponent	Location	Score	OT	Attendance	Record
1	December 27, 2003	@ Rochester Knighthawks	Blue Cross Arena	W 13–7		7,984	1–0
2	January 10, 2004	@ Buffalo Bandits	HSBC Arena	W 16–13			2–0
3	January 17, 2004	Rochester Knighthawks	Wachovia Center	L 11–17			2–1
4	January 23, 2004	@ San Jose Stealth	HP Pavilion at San Jose	L 10–12			2–2
5	January 31, 2004	Buffalo Bandits	Wachovia Center	L 10–18			2–3
6	February 7, 2004	@ Toronto Rock	Air Canada Centre	W 10–8		17,550	3–3
7	February 14, 2004	Arizona Sting	Wachovia Center	W 16–12			4–3
8	February 21, 2004	Buffalo Bandits	Wachovia Center	L 8–12			4–4
9	February 27, 2004	@ Toronto Rock	Air Canada Centre	L 15–18			4–5
10	February 28, 2004	Toronto Rock	Wachovia Center	L 10–11			4–6
11	March 6, 2004	@ Colorado Mammoth	Pepsi Center	L 12–13		17,385	4–7
12	March 13, 2004	Toronto Rock	Wachovia Center	L 10–12			4–8
13	March 20, 2004	Anaheim Storm	Wachovia Center	W 14–9		13,153	5–8
14	March 27, 2004	Rochester Knighthawks	Wachovia Center	W 12–8			6–8
15	April 3, 2004	@ Rochester Knighthawks	Blue Cross Arena	L 8–13			6–9
16	April 4, 2004	@ Buffalo Bandits	HSBC Arena	W 17–15			7–9

== Roster ==
No.		Position	Player
32	(United States)	Def	Barrett, Bryan
66	(United States)	Fwd	Bergey, Jake
32	(United States)	Def	Brzeski, Richard
6	(United States)	Def	Cantabene, Paul
17	(United States)	Fwd	Cromwell, Keith
	(United States)	Fwd	Donovan, Hugh
	(United States)	Fwd	Frye, Mark
35	(Canada)	Goalie	Eliuk, Dallas
	(Canada)	Def	Guindon, Andrew
	(Canada)	Def	Hajek, Tom
7	(United States)	Fwd	Henderson, Tony
	(United States)	Fwd	Howard, Kevin

No.		Position	Player
24	(United States)	Def	Jacobs, Peter
42	(Canada)	Fwd	Marechek, Tom
27	(United States)	Fwd	Marohl, Dan
	(Canada)	Def	Martin, Andrew
34	(United States)	Def	Nadelen, Shawn
90	(Canada)	Fwd	Ratcliffe, Jeff
30	(United States)	Goalie	Schroeder, Nick
47	(United States)	Def	Spano, Jeff
36	(United States)	Fwd	Tower, Brian
42	(Canada)	Fwd	Ward, Ryan
		Fwd	Wasik, Andrew

== See also ==
- Philadelphia Wings
- 2004 NLL season
