= 1987 Eagle Pro Box Lacrosse League Playoffs =

Tournament details
- Dates: N/A–March 21, 1987
- Teams: 4

Final positions
- Champions: Baltimore Thunder
- Runners-up: Washington Wave
- Semifinalists: New Jersey Saints; Philadelphia Wings

Awards
- MVP: Buzz Sheain

The 1987 Eagle Pro Box Lacrosse League Playoffs began in March 1987 with the championship on March 21, 1987.

All 4 teams made the playoffs, New Jersey Saints in 1st place, Philadelphia Wings in 2nd, Washington Wave in 3rd, Baltimore Thunder in 4th, even though New Jersey and Philadelphia were the top 2, Baltimore and Washington both upset them and Baltimore won the league's first title.

Semifinals
1	New Jersey	9
4	Baltimore	14
2	Philadelphia	15
3	Washington	20

Championship
3	Washington	10
4	Baltimore	11

Playoff Games

Baltimore Thunder 14 @ New Jersey Saints 9

Washington Wave 11 @ Philadelphia Wings 10

Championship

Baltimore Thunder 11 @ Washington Wave 10

== See also ==
- 1987 in sports
