= 1991 Philadelphia Wings season =

1991 Philadelphia Wings
- League: Major Indoor Lacrosse League
- Division: 3rd American
- 1991 record: 5–5
- Home record: 3–2
- Road record: 2–3
- Goals for: 129
- Goals against: 131
- Coach: Dave Evans
- Arena: Wachovia Spectrum

The 1991 Philadelphia Wings season marked the team's fifth season of operation.

== Game log ==
#	Date	at/vs.	Opponent	Score	Attendance	Record
1	January 5, 1991	at	Detroit Turbos	8–18	6,847	Loss
2	January 11, 1991	vs.	New England Blazers	11–10	14,789	Win
3	January 19, 1991	at	New York Saints	13–19	9,081	Loss
4	January 26, 1991	vs.	New York Saints	13–8	16,282	Win
5	February 10, 1991	vs.	Detroit Turbos	12–14	16,642	Loss
6	February 22, 1991	at	New England Blazers	11–13	7,095	Loss
7	February 28, 1991	vs.	Pittsburgh Bulls	11–9	13,712	Win
8	March 9, 1991	at	Pittsburgh Bulls	15–7	8,589	Win
9	March 17, 1991	vs.	Baltimore Thunder	14–17	16,289	Loss
10	March 23, 1991	at	Baltimore Thunder	0–16	10,265	Win

(p) – denotes playoff game

== Roster ==
No.		Position	Player
99	(United States)	Fwd	Burt, Tom (Virginia)
17	(United States)	Goalie	Carney, Pat (Swarthmore)
10	(United States)	Fwd	Conley, John (Towson)
14	(United States)	Fwd	Curry, Todd (Syracuse)
20	(United States)	Fwd	DeCicco, Andy
25	(United States)	Fwd	DeCicco, Mark
77	(United States)	Fwd	Delligatti, Lou
3	(United States)	Fwd	Deniken, Paul (Washington College)
35	(United States)	Goalie	Eliuk, Dallas
9	(United States)	Fwd	Flynn, Chris (Penn)
13	(United States)	Fwd	Fried, Ricky (UMBC)
6	(United States)	Fwd	Gabrielsen, Scott (Vermont)

No.		Position	Player
4	(United States)	Fwd	Hahn, Mark (UMBC)
11	(United States)	Fwd	Holthaus, John
26	(United States)	Fwd	Hoynes, Rob
30	(United States)	Fwd	Kotz, Brad (Syracuse)
8	(United States)	Fwd	Manley, Greg
33	(United States)	Fwd	Martin, Gary (Penn State)
12	(United States)	Fwd	McEvoy, John (Villanova)
5	(United States)	Fwd	McGeady, Matt (Maryland)
1	(United States)	Goalie	Moschella, Mark (Drexel)
34	(United States)	Fwd	Resch, Tony (Yale)
2	(United States)	Fwd	Tucker, John
55	(United States)	Fwd	Wilson, Andy

== See also ==
- Philadelphia Wings
- 1991 MILL season
