= National Lacrosse League Cup =

Trophy awarded to the playoff winners in the National Lacrosse League

National Lacrosse League Cup (formerly known as Champion’s Cup)
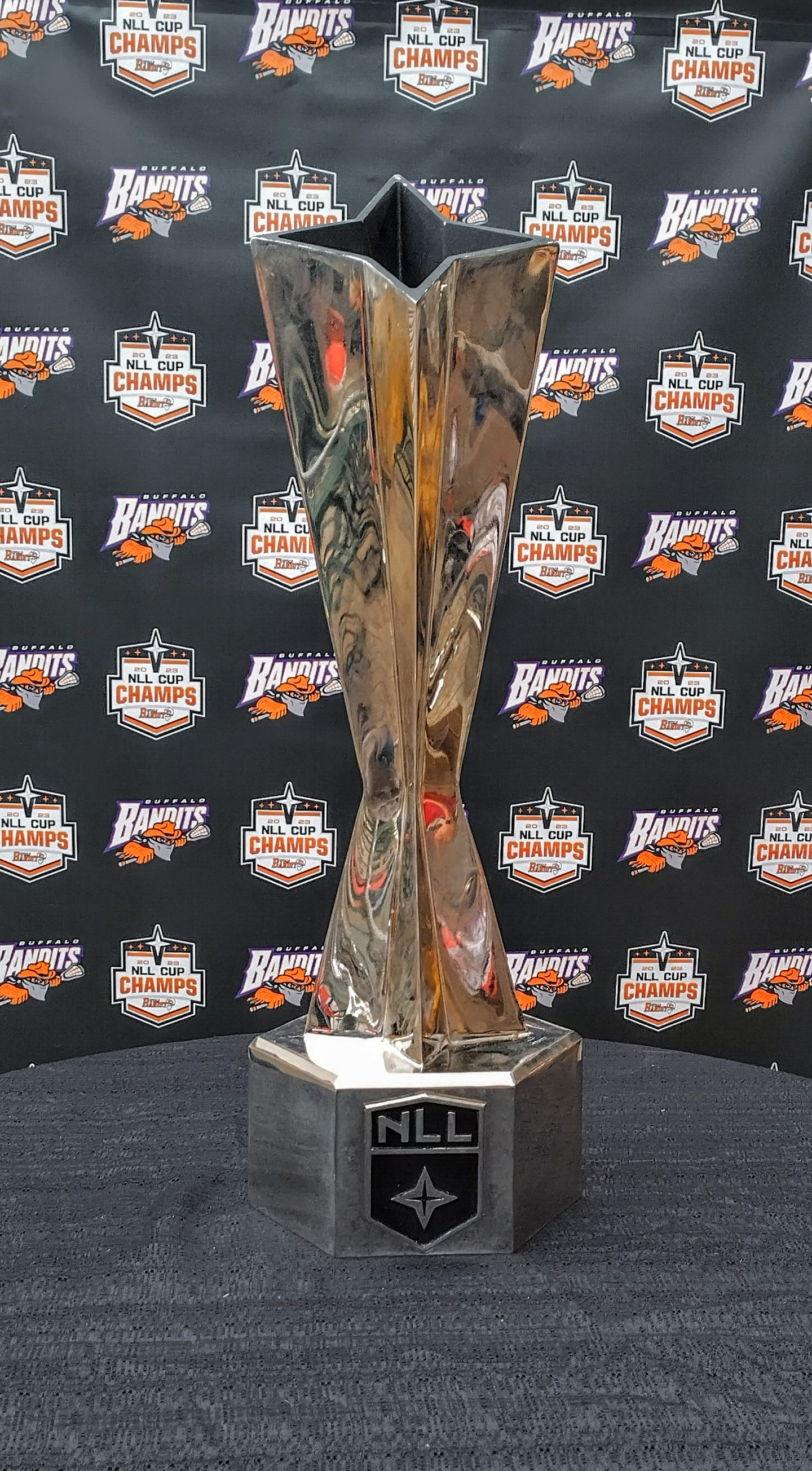
- The National Lacrosse League Cup in 2023 presented to that season's champion, the Buffalo Bandits
- Sport: Box Lacrosse
- Awarded for: The winner of the National Lacrosse League championship finals.

History
- First award: 1998
- First winner: Philadelphia Wings
- Most wins: Buffalo Bandits (7) Toronto Rock (7)
- Most recent: Toronto Rock (7th title)

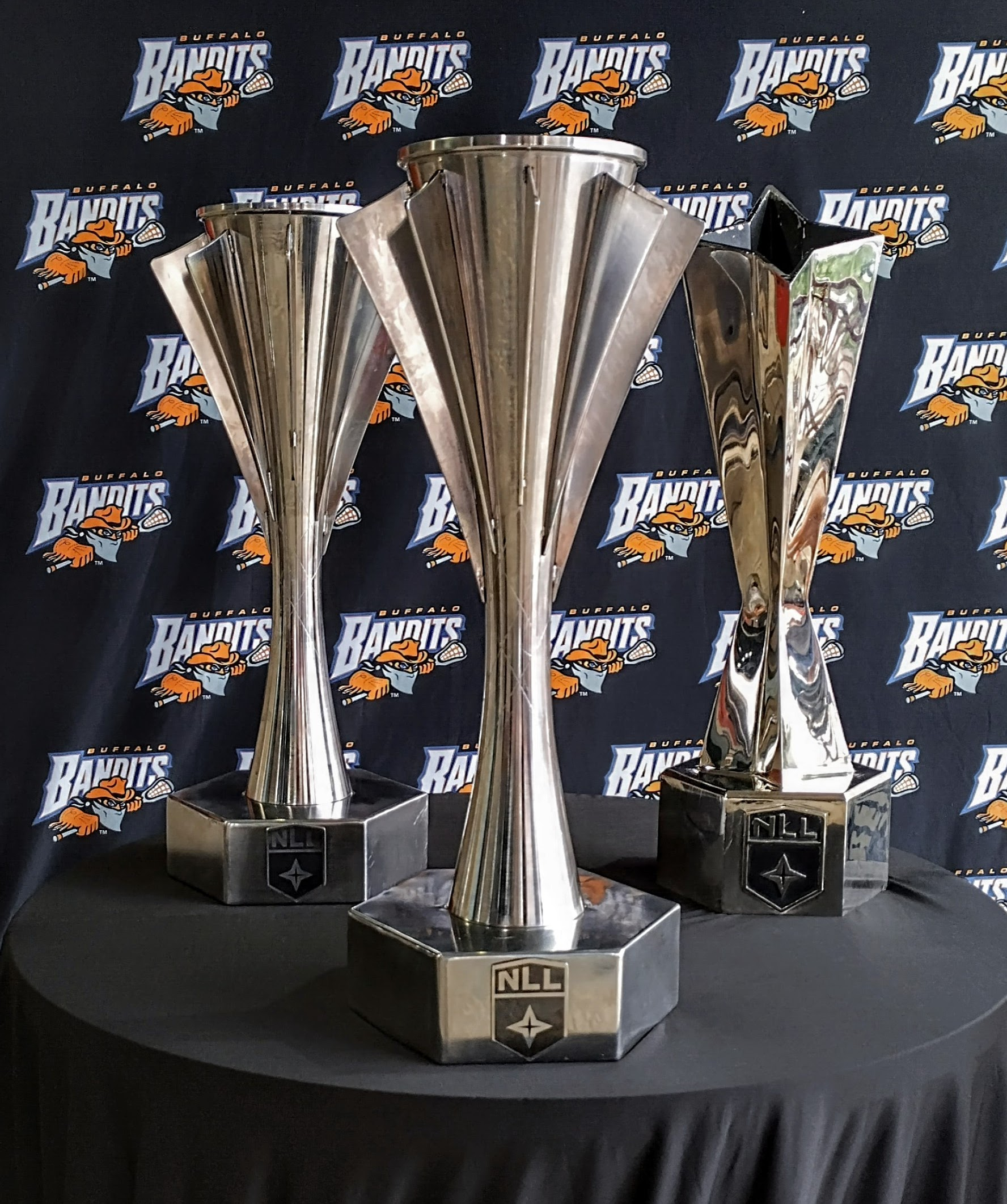
Three National Lacrosse League Cups, each awarded to the Buffalo Bandits. The design of the Cup on the right was used from 2018 through 2023. The design of the other two cups has been utilized since 2024.

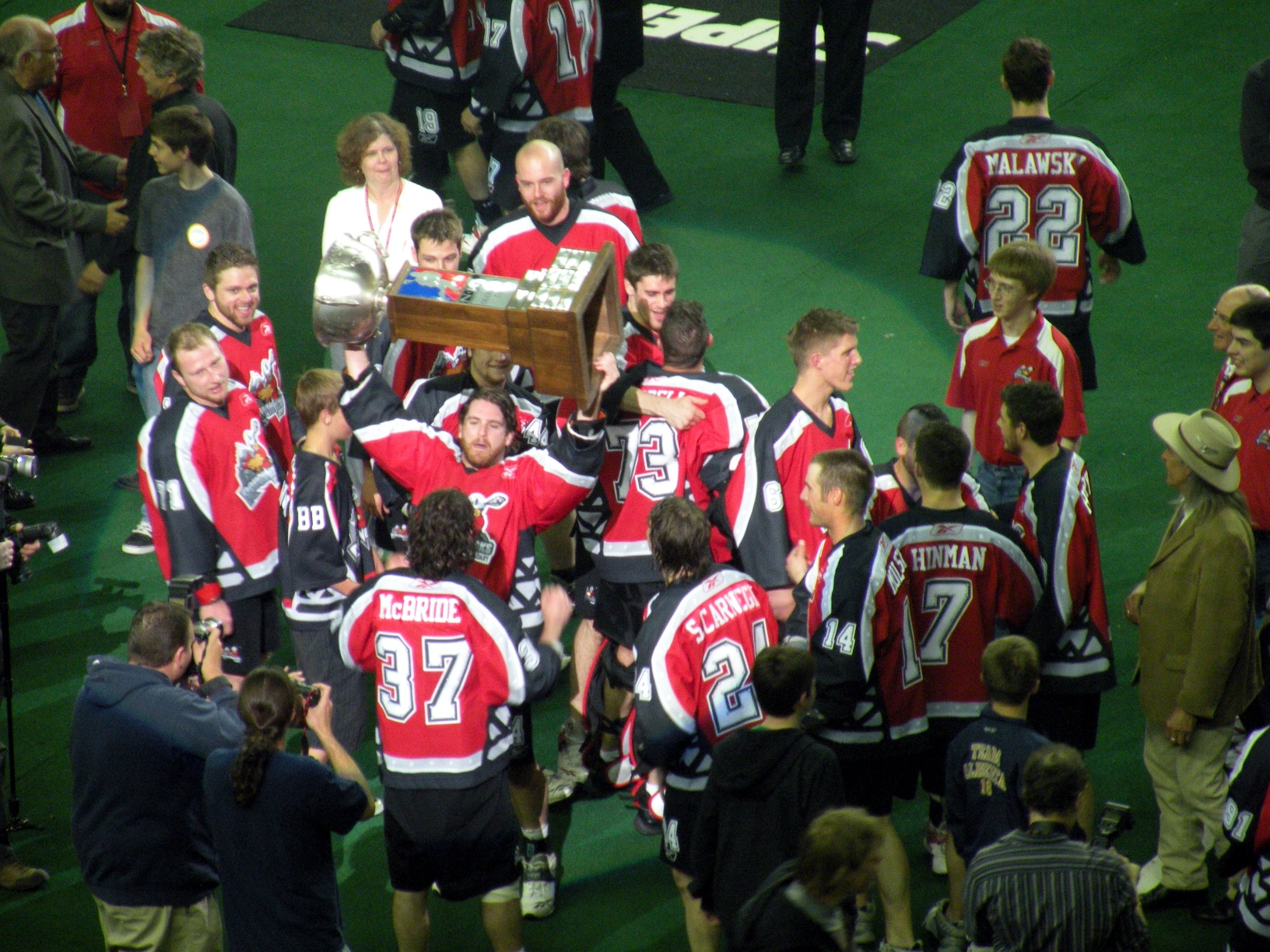
The Calgary Roughnecks raise the Champion's Cup in celebration of their 2009 championship.

The National Lacrosse League Cup (NLL Cup) is the trophy awarded each year to the champions of the National Lacrosse League (NLL). Prior to 2018, the league awarded the Champions Cup. The NLL Cup was redesigned in 2024.

== Winners ==
Year	Winner	Runner-up	Score	Series
1998	Philadelphia Wings	Baltimore Thunder		2–0
1999	Toronto Rock	Rochester Knighthawks	13–10	
2000	Toronto Rock	Rochester Knighthawks	14–13	
2001	Philadelphia Wings	Toronto Rock	9–8	
2002	Toronto Rock	Albany Attack	13–12	
2003	Toronto Rock	Rochester Knighthawks	8–6	
2004	Calgary Roughnecks	Buffalo Bandits	14–11	
2005	Toronto Rock	Arizona Sting	19–13	
2006	Colorado Mammoth	Buffalo Bandits	16–9	
2007	Rochester Knighthawks	Arizona Sting	13–11	
2008	Buffalo Bandits	Portland LumberJax	14–13	
2009	Calgary Roughnecks	New York Titans	12–10	
2010	Washington Stealth	Toronto Rock	15–11	
2011	Toronto Rock	Washington Stealth	8–7	
2012	Rochester Knighthawks	Edmonton Rush	9–6	
2013	Rochester Knighthawks	Washington Stealth	11–10	
2014	Rochester Knighthawks	Calgary Roughnecks		2–1
2015	Edmonton Rush	Toronto Rock		2–0
2016	Saskatchewan Rush	Buffalo Bandits		2–0
2017	Georgia Swarm	Saskatchewan Rush		2–0
2018	Saskatchewan Rush	Rochester Knighthawks		2–1
2019	Calgary Roughnecks	Buffalo Bandits		2–0
2022	Colorado Mammoth	Buffalo Bandits		2–1
2023	Buffalo Bandits	Colorado Mammoth		2–1
2024	Buffalo Bandits	Albany FireWolves		2–0
2025	Buffalo Bandits	Saskatchewan Rush		2–1
2026	Toronto Rock	Halifax Thunderbirds		2–0

== Most Valuable Players ==
Year	Winner	Team	Statistics
1998	Dallas Eliuk	Philadelphia Wings	2 wins
1999	Colin Doyle	Toronto Rock	4 goals, 2 assists
2000	Dan Stroup	Toronto Rock	5 goals
2001	Dallas Eliuk	Philadelphia Wings	40 saves
2002	Colin Doyle	Toronto Rock	3 goals, 1 assist
2003	Bob Watson	Toronto Rock	40 saves
2004	Curtis Palidwor	Calgary Roughnecks	41 saves
2005	Colin Doyle	Toronto Rock	5 goals, 3 assists
2006	Gavin Prout	Colorado Mammoth	4 goals, 3 assists
2007	John Grant, Jr.	Rochester Knighthawks	3 goals, 5 assists
2008	Mark Steenhuis	Buffalo Bandits	5 goals, 1 assist
2009	Josh Sanderson	Calgary Roughnecks	2 goals, 3 assists
2010	Lewis Ratcliff	Washington Stealth	5 goals, 1 assist
2011	Bob Watson	Toronto Rock	46 saves
2012	Cody Jamieson	Rochester Knighthawks	4 goals, 4 assists
2013	Cody Jamieson	Rochester Knighthawks	3 goals, 2 assists
2014	Dan Dawson	Rochester Knighthawks	3 goals, 5 assists
2015	Mark Matthews	Edmonton Rush	5 goals, 3 assists
2016	Aaron Bold	Saskatchewan Rush	9.50 GAA, 82.5% save pct.
2017	Lyle Thompson	Georgia Swarm	3 goals, 4 assists
2018	Jeff Shattler	Saskatchewan Rush	7 goals, 5 assists
2019	Dane Dobbie	Calgary Roughnecks	7 goals, 6 assists
2022	Dillon Ward	Colorado Mammoth	289 playoff saves
2023	Dhane Smith	Buffalo Bandits	9 goals, 14 assists
2024	Josh Byrne	Buffalo Bandits	4 goals, 12 assists
2025	Ian MacKay	Buffalo Bandits	7 goals, 5 assists
2026	Sam English	Toronto Rock	8 goals, 10 assists

== All-time Finals appearances since league inception ==
Appearances	Team	Wins	Losses	Winning %
Currently active franchises
14	Buffalo Bandits	7	7	.500
10	Toronto Rock	7	3	.700
6	Colorado Mammoth	3	3	.500
5	Saskatchewan Rush	3	2	.600
4	Vancouver Warriors	1	3	.250
4	Calgary Roughnecks	3	1	.750
1	Georgia Swarm	1	0	1.000
1	Halifax Thunderbirds	0	1	.000
Inactive franchises - Knighthawks relocated, not inactive
10	Rochester Knighthawks (1995–2019)	5	5	.500
9	Philadelphia Wings	6	3	.667
2	New York Saints	1	1	.500
2	Arizona Sting	0	2	.000
2	Washington Wave	0	2	.000
1	Detroit Turbos	1	0	1.000
1	Albany FireWolves	0	1	.000
1	Boston Blazers (1992–1997)	0	1	.000
1	New York Titans	0	1	.000
1	Portland LumberJax	0	1	.000

== All-time league championships ==
League championships	Team	Winning seasons
7	Toronto Rock	1999, 2000, 2002, 2003, 2005, 2011, 2026
7	Buffalo Bandits	1992, 1993, 1996, 2008, 2023, 2024, 2025
6	Philadelphia Wings	1989, 1990, 1994, 1995, 1998, 2001
5	Rochester Knighthawks (1995–2019)	1997, 2007, 2012, 2013, 2014
3	Saskatchewan Rush	2015, 2016, 2018
3	Calgary Roughnecks	2004, 2009, 2019
3	Colorado Mammoth	1987, 2006, 2022
1	Detroit Turbos	1991
1	Georgia Swarm	2017
1	New York Saints	1988
1	Washington Stealth	2010

== National Lacrosse League Cup Appearances ==
Appearances	Team	Wins	Losses	Winning %
4	Buffalo Bandits	2	2	.500
2	Colorado Mammoth	1	1	.500
2	Saskatchewan Rush	1	1	.500
1
1	Calgary Roughnecks	1	0	1.000
1	Rochester Knighthawks (1995-2019)	0	1	.000
1	Albany FireWolves	0	1	.000

== All-time National Lacrosse League Cup wins ==
NLL Cups won	Team	Winning seasons
3	Buffalo Bandits	2023, 2024, 2025
1
1	Saskatchewan Rush	2018
1	Calgary Roughnecks	2019
1	Colorado Mammoth	2022
1	Toronto Rock	2026

== Champion's Cup appearances ==
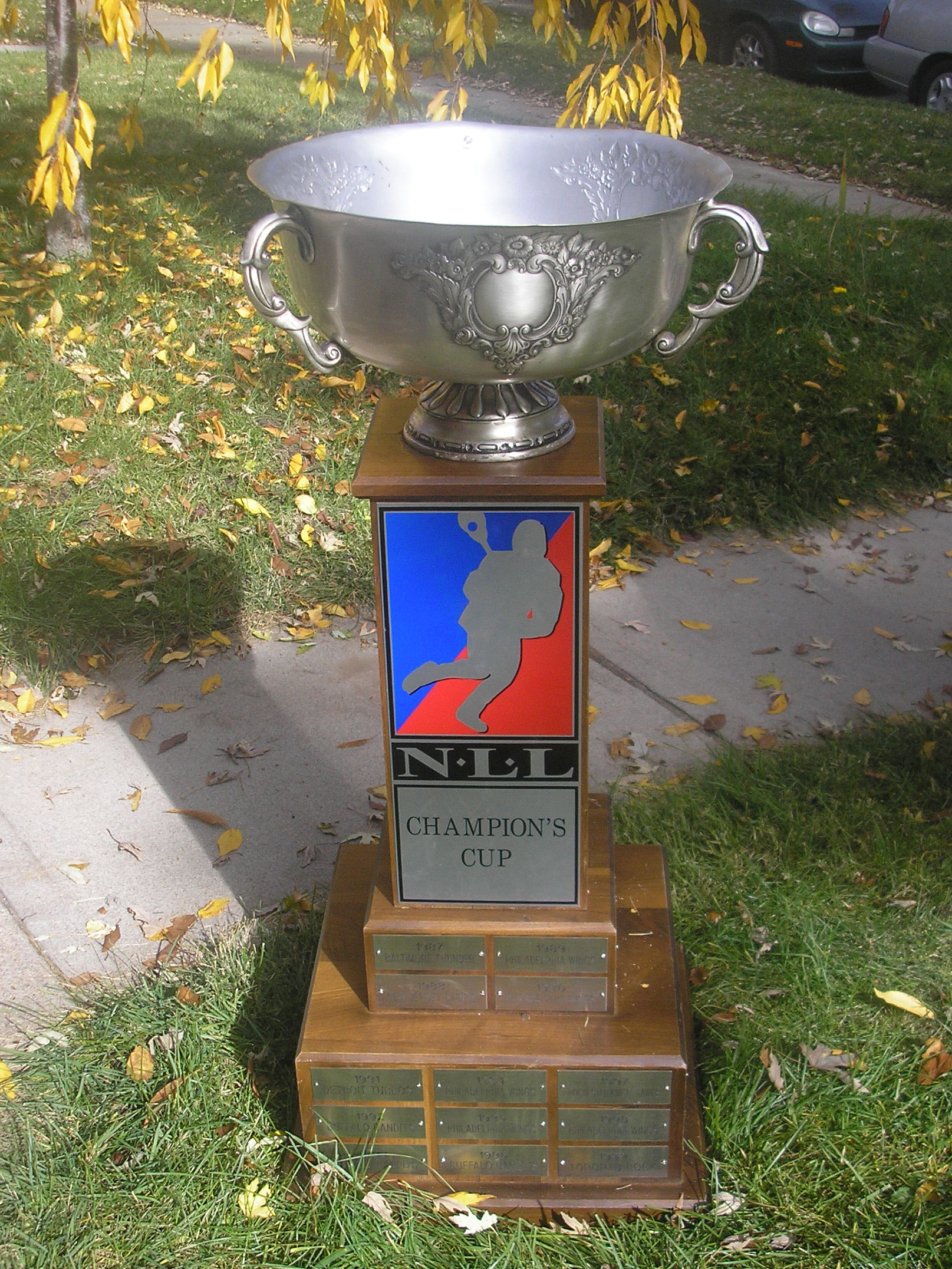
The NLL Champion's Cup, photographed in 2006 after the winning season of the Colorado Mammoth

Awarded from 1998 to 2017

Appearances	Team	Wins	Losses	Winning %
Currently active franchises
9	Toronto Rock	6	3	.667
7	Rochester Knighthawks (1995-2019)	4	3	.571
4	Saskatchewan Rush	2	2	.500
4	Vancouver Warriors	1	3	.250
4	Buffalo Bandits	1	3	.250
4	Calgary Roughnecks	3	1	.750
2	Philadelphia Wings (1987-2014)	2	0	1.000
1	Colorado Mammoth	1	0	1.000
1	Georgia Swarm	1	0	1.000
Inactive franchises
2	Arizona Sting	0	2	.000
1	New York Titans	0	1	.000
1	Portland LumberJax	0	1	.000

== All-time Champion's Cup wins ==
Champion's Cups won	Team	Winning seasons
6	Toronto Rock	1999, 2000, 2002, 2003, 2005, 2011
4	Rochester Knighthawks (1995-2019)	2007, 2012, 2013, 2014
2	Calgary Roughnecks	2004, 2009
2	Philadelphia Wings (1987-2014)	1998, 2001
2	Saskatchewan Rush	2015, 2016
1	Buffalo Bandits	2008
1	Colorado Mammoth	2006
1	Georgia Swarm	2017
1	Washington Stealth	2010

== North American Cup era ==
For the 1987 and 1988 seasons, the league was known as the Eagle Pro Box Lacrosse League; from the 1989 season until the conclusion of the 1997 season, the league was known as the Major Indoor Lacrosse League. In 1998, the Major Indoor Lacrosse League changed to become the National Lacrosse League. During the entire non-NLL name era (1987-1997), a different trophy was awarded to the league champion called the North American Cup. It was a tall, skinny, silver-colored trophy that somewhat resembled the Stanley Cup.

== North American Cup era league champions ==
Year	Winner	Runner-up	Score
	Eagle Pro Box Lacrosse League		
1987	Baltimore Thunder	Washington Wave	11—10
1988	New Jersey Saints	Washington Wave	17—16
	Major Indoor Lacrosse League		
1989	Philadelphia Wings	New York Saints	11—10
1990	Philadelphia Wings	New England Blazers	17—7
1991	Detroit Turbos	Baltimore Thunder	14—12
1992	Buffalo Bandits	Philadelphia Wings	11—10 (OT)
1993	Buffalo Bandits	Philadelphia Wings	13—12
1994	Philadelphia Wings	Buffalo Bandits	26—15
1995	Philadelphia Wings	Rochester Knighthawks	15—14 (OT)
1996	Buffalo Bandits	Philadelphia Wings	15—10
1997	Rochester Knighthawks	Buffalo Bandits	15—12

== See also ==
- Mann Cup
