= 1993 Philadelphia Wings season =

1993 Philadelphia Wings
- American Division Champions
- League: Major Indoor Lacrosse League
- Division: 1st American
- 1993 record: 7–1
- Home record: 4–0
- Road record: 3–1
- Goals for: 121
- Goals against: 86
- Coach: Dave Evans
- Arena: Wachovia Spectrum

The 1993 Philadelphia Wings season marked the team's seventh season of operation.

== Game log ==
#	Date	at/vs.	Opponent	Score	Attendance	Record
1	January 15, 1993	vs.	Baltimore Thunder	17–14	16,274	Win
2	January 22, 1993	at	Boston Blazers	12–9	8,186	Win
3	January 23, 1993	vs.	Detroit Turbos	22–15	16,068	Win
4	January 30, 1993	at	Baltimore Thunder	23–9	11,408	Win
5	February 6, 1993	vs.	New York Saints	13–8	16,731	Win
6	February 20, 1993	at	New York Saints	13–10	13,796	Win
7	February 27, 1993	at	Buffalo Bandits	12–13	16,325	Loss
8	March 21, 1993	vs.	Pittsburgh Bulls	9 – 8 (OT)	16,182	Win
9 (p)	April 3, 1993	vs.	New York Saints	17–9	13,380	Win
10 (p)	April 10, 1993	at	Buffalo Bandits	12–13	16,325	Loss

(p) – denotes playoff game

== Roster ==
No.		Position	Player
30	(United States)	Fwd	Bates, Chris (Dartmouth)
7	(United States)	Fwd	Burt, Tom
10	(United States)	Fwd	Conley, John
3	(United States)	Fwd	Deniken, Paul
35	(Canada)	Goalie	Eliuk, Dallas
11	(United States)	Fwd	Finneran, Kevin
9	(United States)	Fwd	Flynn, Chris (Penn)
8	(United States)	Fwd	Gabrielsen, Scott
22	(Canada)	Fwd	Gait, Gary (Syracuse)
19	(Canada)	Fwd	Gait, Paul (Syracuse)
55	(United States)	Fwd	Gilhuley, Steve
4	(United States)	Fwd	Hahn, Mark
26	(United States)	Fwd	Hoynes, Rob

No.		Position	Player
38	(Canada)	Goalie	Maetche, Dwight
33	(United States)	Fwd	Martin, Gary (Penn State)
12	(United States)	Fwd	McEvoy, John
99	(United States)	Fwd	Miller, Billy
20	(United States)	Fwd	Moore, Matt
15	(United States)	Fwd	Nostrant, John
1	(United States)	Goalie	Piazza, Andy
34	(United States)	Fwd	Resch, Tony
14	(United States)	Fwd	Rogers, Jim
18	(United States)	Fwd	Shek, Rob (Towson)
6	(United States)	Fwd	Voelker, Bryan
17	(United States)	Goalie	Warren, Chuck

== See also ==
- Philadelphia Wings
- 1993 MILL season
