= 1989 Philadelphia Wings season =

1989 Philadelphia Wings
- Major Indoor Lacrosse League Champions
- Division Champions
- League: Major Indoor Lacrosse League
- Rank: 1st
- 1989 record: 6–2
- Home record: 4–0
- Road record: 2–2
- Goals for: 122
- Goals against: 96
- General Manager: Mike French
- Coach: Dave Evans
- Arena: Wachovia Spectrum
- Average attendance: 14,975

Team leaders
- Goals: Brad Kotz(31)
- Assists: John Tucker (28)
- Points: Brad Kotz (50)

The 1989 Philadelphia Wings season marked the team's third season of operation. In 1989, the Eagle Pro Box Lacrosse League changed its name to the Major Indoor Lacrosse League.

The Wings also made a move on the field that season, winning their first league championship. This was the first of a record six National Lacrosse league titles. They recorded 7 wins and 2 losses while once again drawing upon an ever increasing home base, with a total home attendance of 74,876 (14,975 per game).

Star players Brad Kotz and Tony Resch led the team.

== Game log ==
#	Date	at/vs.	Opponent	Score	Attendance	Record
1	January 14, 1989	vs.	New England Blazers	19–8	16,269	Win
2	January 21, 1989	at	Baltimore Thunder	14–13	6,479	Win
3	January 28, 1989	at	New York Saints	16–20	9,324	Loss
4	February 12, 1989	vs.	Baltimore Thunder	14–9	12,220	Win
5	February 18, 1989	vs.	Detroit Turbos	19–10	13,932	Win
6	February 24, 1989	at	New England Blazers	16–11	8,107	Win
7	March 4, 1989	at	Detroit Turbos	11–16	10,637	Loss
8	March 10, 1989	vs.	Washington Wave	13–9	16,413	Win
9 (p)	April 7, 1989	vs.	New York Saints	11 – 10 *	16,042	Win

(p) – denotes playoff game

- * MILL Championship

== 1989 Highlights ==
- The Wings drew a total of 74,876 fans at home, 14,975 per game.
- Brad Kotz led the league with 50 points and 31 goals, John Tucker led the league with 28 assists.
- The Wings won the first of their league record six total championships.

== Roster ==
Reference: WingsZone History Archive

No.		Position	Player
20	(United States)	Goalie	Bilger, Kevin (Maryland)
99	(United States)	Fwd	Bozel, Jeff (Loyola)
37	(United States)	Goalie	Carney, Pat (Swarthmore)
5	(United States)	Fwd	Carruthers, Scott (Drexel)
10	(United States)	Fwd	Conley, John (Towson)
25	(United States)	Fwd	DeCicco, Mark (Towson)
77	(United States)	Fwd	Delligatti, Lou (Towson)
26	(United States)	Fwd	Dent, Chris (Penn State)
44	(United States)	Fwd	Dirrigl, Bill (Syracuse)
11	(Canada)	Fwd	French, Paul (Virginia)
13	(United States)	Fwd	Fried, Rick (UMBC)
6	(United States)	Fwd	Gabrielsen, Scott (Vermont)
4	(United States)	Fwd	Hahn, Mark (UMBC)

No.		Position	Player
30	(United States)	Fwd	Kotz, Brad (Syracuse)
8	(United States)	Fwd	Manley, Greg (Loyola)
33	(United States)	Fwd	Martin, Gary (Penn State)
3	(United States)	Fwd	McGeady, Matt (Maryland)
28	(United States)	Fwd	McGeeney, John (UMBC)
9	(United States)	Fwd	McGrath, Steve (Washington & Lee)
1	(United States)	Goalie	Moschella, Mark (Drexel)
14	(United States)	Goalie	O'Brien, John
34	(United States)	Fwd	Resch, Tony (Yale)
7	(Canada)	Fwd	Tasker, Dave (Langara)
2	(United States)	Fwd	Tucker, John (Hopkins)
55	(United States)	Fwd	Wilson, Andy (Loyola)

== See also ==
- 1989 MILL season
- List of NLL Championships won
- Philadelphia Wings
