= 1990 Philadelphia Wings season =

1990 Philadelphia Wings
- Major Indoor Lacrosse League Champions
- League: Major Indoor Lacrosse League
- Rank: 2nd
- 1990 record: 6–2
- Home record: 3–1
- Road record: 3–1
- Goals for: 89
- Goals against: 82
- General Manager: Mike French
- Coach: Dave Evans
- Arena: Wachovia Spectrum

The 1990 Philadelphia Wings season marked the team's fourth season of operation and second league championship.

== Game log ==
#	Date	at/vs.	Opponent	Score	Attendance	Record
1	January 12, 1990	at	New York Saints	9–4	10,126	Win
2	January 13, 1990	vs.	Pittsburgh Bulls	13–8	16,101	Win
3	February 11, 1990	vs.	Detroit Turbos	21–19	15,204	Win
4	February 17, 1990	at	Baltimore Thunder	14–13	10,904	Win
5	March 3, 1990	at	Pittsburgh Bulls	9–8	12,121	Win
6	March 11, 1990	vs.	Baltimore Thunder	10–9	16,711	Win
7	March 16, 1990	at	New England Blazers	11–13	10,551	Loss
8	March 24, 1990	vs.	New York Saints	5–8	17,177	Loss
9 (p)	April 7, 1990	vs.	New York Saints	11–10	13,552	Win
10(p)	April 13, 1990	at	New England Blazers	17 – 7 *	11,479	Win

(p) – denotes playoff game

- * MILL Championship

== Roster ==
No.		Position	Player
20	(United States)	Goalie	Bilger, Kevin (Maryland)
10	(United States)	Fwd	Conley, John (Towson)
14	(United States)	Fwd	Curry, Todd (Syracuse)
11	(United States)	Fwd	Davy, Brett (North Carolina)
25	(United States)	Fwd	DeCicco, Mark (Towson)
77	(United States)	Fwd	Delligatti, Lou (Towson)
3	(United States)	Fwd	Deniken, Paul (Washington College)
26	(United States)	Fwd	Dent, Chris (Penn State)
44	(United States)	Fwd	Dirrigl, Bill (Syracuse)
9	(United States)	Fwd	Flynn, Chris (Penn)
13	(United States)	Fwd	Fried, Rick (UMBC)
6	(United States)	Fwd	Gabrielsen, Scott (Vermont)
4	(United States)	Fwd	Hahn, Mark (UMBC)

No.		Position	Player
7	(United States)	Fwd	Holthaus, John (Loyola)
37	(United States)	Fwd	Kelly, Mike
30	(United States)	Fwd	Kotz, Brad (Syracuse)
99	(United States)	Fwd	Lamon, Pat (Loyola)
35	(Canada)	Goalie	Maetche, Dwight
8	(United States)	Fwd	Manley, Greg (Loyola)
33	(United States)	Fwd	Martin, Gary (Penn State)
5	(United States)	Fwd	McGeady, Matt (Maryland)
1	(United States)	Goalie	Moschella, Mark (Drexel)
34	(United States)	Fwd	Resch, Tony (Yale)
2	(United States)	Fwd	Tucker, John (Johns Hopkins)
55	(United States)	Fwd	Wilson, Andy (Loyola)

- General Manager: Mike French
- Assistant General Manager: Peter Tyson
- Coach: Dave Evans
- Assistant coach: Mike Paige
- Equipment Manager: Larry Subotich
- Trainer: Kelly Donnelly
- Assistant trainer: Nick Coppolino

== See also ==
- Philadelphia Wings
- 1990 MILL season
