= 1996 Philadelphia Wings season =

1996 Philadelphia Wings
- Division Champions
- League: Major Indoor Lacrosse League
- Rank: T-1st
- 1996 record: 8–2
- Home record: 4–1
- Road record: 4–1
- Goals for: 165
- Goals against: 114
- Coach: Tony Resch
- Arena: Wachovia Spectrum

The 1996 Philadelphia Wings season marked the team's tenth season of operation.

== Game log ==
#	Date	at/vs.	Opponent	Score	Attendance	Record
1	January 12, 1996	at	Buffalo Bandits	12–15	13,024	Loss
2	January 13, 1996	at	Baltimore Thunder	17–12	5,989	Win
3	January 27, 1996	vs.	New York Saints	23–8	14,122	Win
4	February 2, 1996	vs.	Rochester Knighthawks	17–14	13,014	Win
5	February 3, 1996	at	New York Saints	15–6	9,381	Win
6	February 17, 1996	at	Rochester Knighthawks	15–18	7,394	Loss
7	February 24, 1996	vs.	Boston Blazers	12–10	16,818	Win
8	March 2, 1996	at	Charlotte Cobras	14–8	2,813	Win
9	March 9, 1996	vs.	Charlotte Cobras	26–11	16,244	Win
10	March 23, 1996	vs.	Buffalo Bandits	14–12	15,242	Win
11 (p)	April 6, 1996	vs.	Boston Blazers	10–8	12,092	Win
12(p)	April 12, 1996	at	Buffalo Bandits	10–15	16,230	Loss

(p) – denotes playoff game

== Roster ==
No.		Position	Player
20	(United States)	Fwd	Burt, Tom
27	(United States)	Fwd	Cummings, Mike
3	(United States)	Fwd	Deniken, Paul
28	(United States)	Fwd	Dwan, Matt
35	(Canada)	Goalie	Eliuk, Dallas
11	(United States)	Fwd	Finneran, Kevin
9	(United States)	Fwd	Flynn, Chris
8	(United States)	Fwd	Gabrielsen, Scott
22	(Canada)	Fwd	Gait, Gary
44	(Canada)	Fwd	Govett, Steven
23	(United States)	Goalie	Hunter, Bill
24	(United States)	Fwd	Jacobs, Peter

No.		Position	Player
16	(United States)	Fwd	Leahy, Bill
42	(Canada)	Fwd	Marechek, Tom
99	(United States)	Fwd	Miller, Billy
15	(United States)	Fwd	Nostrant, John
7	(United States)	Fwd	O'Grady, Paul
1	(United States)	Goalie	Piazza, Andy
13	(United States)	Fwd	Roe, Gabby (Virginia)
14	(United States)	Fwd	Rogers, Jim
4	(United States)	Fwd	Simmers, Taylor
6	(United States)	Fwd	Voelker, Bryan
29	(United States)	Fwd	Wilson, Matt

== See also ==
- Philadelphia Wings
- 1996 MILL season
