= 1997 Philadelphia Wings season =

1997 Philadelphia Wings
- Division Champions
- League: Major Indoor Lacrosse League
- Rank: 1st
- 1997 record: 7–3
- Home record: 3–2
- Road record: 4–1
- Goals for: 137
- Goals against: 115
- Coach: Tony Resch
- Arena: Wachovia Center

The 1997 Philadelphia Wings season marked the team's eleventh season of operation.

== Game log ==
#	Date	at/vs.	Opponent	Score	Attendance	Record
1	January 4, 1997	at	New York Saints	17–14	6,585	Win
2	January 11, 1997	at	Boston Blazers	12–11	6,110	Win
3	January 18, 1997	vs.	Baltimore Thunder	16–11	12,889	Win
4	January 25, 1997	vs.	New York Saints	10 – 9 (2OT)	12,464	Win
5	February 9, 1997	vs.	Rochester Knighthawks	12–17	13,583	Loss
6	February 14, 1997	vs.	Boston Blazers	18–11	12,400	Win
7	February 22, 1997	at	Baltimore Thunder	10–11	5,407	Loss
8	March 15, 1997	at	Buffalo Bandits	16–8	18,595	Win
9	March 22, 1997	vs.	Buffalo Bandits	13 – 14(OT)	17,575	Loss
10	March 29, 1997	at	Rochester Knighthawks	13–9	9,372	Win
11 (p)	April 5, 1997	vs.	Rochester Knighthawks	13–15	18,055	Loss

(p) – denotes playoff game

== Roster ==
No.		Position	Player
20	(United States)	Fwd	Bates, Chris
3	(United States)	Fwd	Deniken, Paul
35	(Canada)	Goalie	Eliuk, Dallas
11	(United States)	Fwd	Finneran, Kevin
9	(United States)	Fwd	Flynn, Chris
8	(United States)	Fwd	Gabrielsen, Scott
22	(Canada)	Fwd	Gait, Gary
44	(Canada)	Fwd	Govett, Steven
23	(United States)	Goalie	Hunter, Bill
24	(United States)	Fwd	Jacobs, Peter
42	(Canada)	Fwd	Marechek, Tom
2	(United States)	Fwd	McEvoy, John

No.		Position	Player
99	(United States)	Fwd	Miller, Billy
21	(United States)	Fwd	Mueller, Adam
88	(United States)	Fwd	Ogelsby, Matt
7	(United States)	Fwd	O'Grady, Paul
1	(United States)	Goalie	Piazza, Andy
13	(United States)	Fwd	Roe, Gabby
14	(United States)	Fwd	Rogers, Jim
43	(United States)	Fwd	Slate, Tom (West Chester)
91	(United States)	Fwd	Traynor, Greg (Virginia)
6	(United States)	Fwd	Voelker, Brian (Hopkins)
29	(United States)	Fwd	Wilson, Matt

== See also ==
- Philadelphia Wings
- 1997 MILL season
