= Larry Quinn =

Larry or Lawrence Quinn may refer to:

- Larry Quinn (lacrosse), American lacrosse goaltender
- Larry Quinn (ice hockey), American ice hockey executive, businessman and politician
- Lawrie Quinn, British politician and railway engineer
