= 1995 Philadelphia Wings season =

1995 Philadelphia Wings
- Major Indoor Lacrosse League Champions
- Division Champions
- League: Major Indoor Lacrosse League
- Rank: 1st
- 1995 record: 7–1
- Home record: 4–0
- Road record: 3–1
- Goals for: 115
- Goals against: 94
- Coach: Tony Resch
- Arena: Wachovia Spectrum

The 1995 Philadelphia Wings season marked the team's ninth season of operation.

== Game log ==
#	Date	at/vs.	Opponent	Score	Attendance	Record
1	January 7, 1995	at	Buffalo Bandits	13–17	16,230	Loss
2	January 14, 1995	at	New York Saints	11–10	10,051	Win
3	January 20, 1995	vs.	Rochester Knighthawks	18–17	16,305	Win
4	January 28, 1995	vs.	Buffalo Bandits	17–10	16,515	Win
5	February 11, 1995	at	Boston Blazers	15–10	7,800	Win
6	February 17, 1995	vs.	New York Saints	11–8	16,623	Win
7	February 25, 1995	at	Baltimore Thunder	15–10	7,260	Win
8	March 11, 1995	vs.	Baltimore Thunder	15–12	17,380	Win
9(p)	March 25, 1995	at	Buffalo Bandits	19–16	10,557	Win
10 (p)	April 8, 1995	vs.	Rochester Knighthawks	15 – 14 (OT)	14,824	Win

(p) – denotes playoff game

== Roster ==
No.		Position	Player
20	(United States)	Fwd	Bates, Chris
3	(United States)	Fwd	Deniken, Paul
35	(Canada)	Goalie	Eliuk, Dallas
11	(United States)	Fwd	Finneran, Kevin
9	(United States)	Fwd	Flynn, Chris
8	(United States)	Fwd	Gabrielsen, Scott
22	(Canada)	Fwd	Gait, Gary
44	(Canada)	Fwd	Govett, Steven
4	(United States)	Fwd	Kerwick, Matt
16	(United States)	Fwd	Leahy, Bill
42	(Canada)	Fwd	Marechek, Tom (Syracuse)
33	(United States)	Fwd	Martin, Gary

No.		Position	Player
12	(United States)	Fwd	McEvoy, John
99	(United States)	Fwd	Miller, Billy
15	(United States)	Fwd	Nostrant, John
7	(United States)	Fwd	O'Grady, Paul
1	(United States)	Goalie	Piazza, Andy (UNC)
13	(United States)	Fwd	Roe, Gabby
14	(United States)	Fwd	Rogers, Jim
43	(United States)	Fwd	Tobin, Mike
6	(United States)	Fwd	Voelker, Brian (Hopkins)
17	(United States)	Goalie	Warren, Chuck
5	(United States)	Fwd	Whitlow, M.V.

== See also ==
- Philadelphia Wings
- 1995 MILL season
