= 1994 Philadelphia Wings season =

1994 Philadelphia Wings
- Major Indoor Lacrosse League Champions
- American Division Champions
- League: Major Indoor Lacrosse League
- Division: 1st American
- 1994 record: 6–2
- Home record: 4–0
- Road record: 2–2
- Goals for: 127
- Goals against: 89
- Coach: Tony Resch
- Arena: Wachovia Spectrum

The 1994 Philadelphia Wings season marked the team's eighth season of operation.

== Game log ==
#	Date	at/vs.	Opponent	Score	Attendance	Record
1	January 23, 1994	vs.	New York Saints	20–7	13,196	Win
2	February 5, 1994	at	Buffalo Bandits	11–15	16,284	Loss
3	February 13, 1994	vs.	Baltimore Thunder	25–9	13,483	Win
4	February 19, 1994	at	Baltimore Thunder	20–17	9,707	Win
5	February 26, 1994	at	New York Saints	4–13	9,039	Loss
6	March 11, 1994	vs.	Detroit Turbos	15–6	16,349	Win
7	March 19, 1994	vs.	Buffalo Bandits	16–12	17,380	Win
8	March 26, 1994	at	Boston Blazers	16–10	8,105	Win
9 (p)	April 10, 1994	vs.	New York Saints	17–7	10,794	Win
10 (p)	April 16, 1994	at	Buffalo Bandits	26–15	16,284	Win

(p) – denotes playoff game

== Roster ==
No.		Position	Player
20	(United States)	Fwd	Bates, Chris (Dartmouth)
27	(United States)	Fwd	Blatchley, John (Towson)
10	(United States)	Fwd	Conley, John (Towson)
3	(United States)	Fwd	Deniken, Paul (Washington College)
35	(Canada)	Goalie	Eliuk, Dallas
11	(United States)	Fwd	Finneran, Kevin (Ohio Wesleyan)
9	(United States)	Fwd	Flynn, Chris (Penn)
8	(United States)	Fwd	Gabrielsen, Scott (Vermont)
22	(Canada)	Fwd	Gait, Gary (Syracuse)
19	(Canada)	Fwd	Gait, Paul (Syracuse)
21	(United States)	Fwd	Gold, Mark (UMBC)
44	(Canada)	Fwd	Govett, Steve

No.		Position	Player
42	(Canada)	Fwd	Marechek, Tom (Syracuse)
33	(United States)	Fwd	Martin, Gary (Penn State)
12	(United States)	Fwd	McEvoy, John (Villanova)
99	(United States)	Fwd	Miller, Billy (Hobart)
15	(United States)	Fwd	Nostrant, John (Washington College)
7	(United States)	Fwd	O'Grady, Paul (Villanova)
1	(United States)	Goalie	Piazza, Andy (North Carolina)
14	(United States)	Fwd	Rogers, Jim (Villanova)
18	(United States)	Fwd	Shek, Rob (Towson)
6	(United States)	Fwd	Voelker, Bryan (Hopkins)
17	(United States)	Goalie	Warren, Chuck (Hobart)

== See also ==
- Philadelphia Wings
- 1994 MILL season
