= 1988 Eagle Pro Box Lacrosse League season =

- League: Eagle Pro Box Lacrosse League
- Sport: Indoor lacrosse
- Duration: January 3, 1988 - March 20, 1988
- Games: 8
- Teams: 4

Regular season
- League champions: Washington Wave
- Runners-up: New Jersey Saints
- Top scorer: Joe Gold (Washington Wave)

Champion's Cup
- Champions: New Jersey Saints (1st title)
- Runners-up: Washington Wave
- Finals MVP: Larry Quinn (New Jersey); Jeff Goldberg (New Jersey)

Eagle Pro / MILL seasons
- ← 1987 season 1989 season →

The 1988 Eagle Pro Box Lacrosse League season is the 2nd season of the Eagle Pro Box Lacrosse, that began on January 3, 1988, and concluded with the championship game on March 20. On May 15, 1988 the league was renamed Major Indoor Lacrosse League (MILL), a name the league would keep for the next ten years.

== Team movement ==
No teams were added, removed, or relocated for the 1988 season.

=== Teams ===
1988 Eagle Pro Box Lacrosse League
Team	City	Arena	Capacity
Baltimore Thunder	Baltimore, Maryland	Baltimore Arena	10,582
New Jersey Saints	East Rutherford, New Jersey	Brendan Byrne Arena	19,040
Philadelphia Wings	Philadelphia, Pennsylvania	Spectrum	17,423
Washington Wave	Landover, Maryland	Capital Centre	18,130

=== Map of teams ===
Eagle Pro Box Lacrosse Teams

== Regular season ==
P	Team	GP	W	L	PCT	GB	Home	Road	GF	GA	Diff	GF/GP	GA/GP
1	Washington Wave – xyz	8	6	2	.750	0.0	4–0	2–2	121	117	+4	15.12	14.62
2	New Jersey Saints – x	8	5	3	.625	1.0	3–1	2–2	125	112	+13	15.62	14.00
3	Philadelphia Wings – x	8	3	5	.375	3.0	2–2	1–3	97	90	+7	12.12	11.25
4	Baltimore Thunder	8	2	6	.250	4.0	2–2	0–4	98	122	−24	12.25	15.25

x: Clinched playoff berth; c: Clinched playoff berth by crossing over to another division; y: Clinched division; z: Clinched best regular season record; GP: Games Played
W: Wins; L: Losses; GB: Games back; PCT: Win percentage; Home: Record at Home; Road: Record on the Road; GF: Goals scored; GA: Goals allowed
Differential: Difference between goals scored and allowed; GF/GP: Average number of goals scored per game; GA/GP: Average number of goals allowed per game

== Playoffs ==
Semifinals			Championship
			2	New Jersey	17
3	Philadelphia	10	1	Washington	16
2	New Jersey	12

== Awards ==
Award	Winner	Team
Championship Game MVP (tie)	Larry Quinn	New Jersey
Championship Game MVP (tie)	Jeff Goldberg	New Jersey

== Statistics leaders ==
Bold numbers indicate new single-season records. Italics indicate tied single-season records.

Stat	Player	Team	Number
Goals	Mark Gold	Washington	**22**
Assists	Joe Gold	Washington	14
Points	Joe Gold	Washington	**34**
Penalty Minutes	F. Tashman	New Jersey	12
Shots on Goal	Joe Gold	Washington	**74**
Loose Balls	Rick Sowell	Washington	**43**
Save Pct.	Kevin Bilger	Philadelphia	77.2%

== Attendance ==
=== Regular season ===
Home team	Home games	Average attendance	Total attendance
Philadelphia Wings	4	12,276	48,910
Washington Wave	4	7,314	29,254
New Jersey Saints	4	6,092	24,366
Baltimore Thunder	4	6,031	24,122
**League**	**16**	**7,916**	**126,652**

=== Playoffs ===
Home team	Home games	Average attendance	Total attendance
Washington Wave	1	8,215	8,215
New Jersey Saints	1	4,118	4,118
**League**	**2**	**6,167**	**12,333**

== See also ==
- 1988 in sports
- 1988 Philadelphia Wings
