= 1987 Eagle Pro Box Lacrosse League season =

- League: Eagle Pro Box Lacrosse League
- Sport: Indoor lacrosse
- Duration: January 10, 1987 - March 21, 1987
- Games: 6
- Teams: 4

Regular season
- League champions: New Jersey Saints
- Runners-up: Philadelphia Wings
- Top scorer: John Tucker (Philadelphia Wings)

Champion's Cup
- Champions: Baltimore Thunder (1st title)
- Runners-up: Washington Wave
- Finals MVP: Buzz Sheain (Baltimore)

Eagle Pro Box Lacrosse League seasons
- 1988 season →

1987 was the inaugural season of the Eagle Pro Box Lacrosse League. The season began on January 10, 1987, and concluded with the championship game on March 21 of that year.

== Teams ==
In the inaugural season of the Eagle Pro Box Lacrosse League, the league consisted of four teams.

1987 Eagle Pro Box Lacrosse League
Team	City	Arena	Capacity
Baltimore Thunder	Baltimore, Maryland	Baltimore Arena	10,582
New Jersey Saints	East Rutherford, New Jersey	Brendan Byrne Arena	19,040
Philadelphia Wings	Philadelphia, Pennsylvania	Spectrum	17,222
Washington Wave	Landover, Maryland	Capital Centre	18,130

=== Map of teams ===
Eagle Pro Box Lacrosse Teams

== Regular season ==
P	Team	GP	W	L	PCT	GB	Home	Road	GF	GA	Diff	GF/GP	GA/GP
1	New Jersey Saints – xyz	6	5	1	.833	0.0	3–0	2–1	88	75	+13	14.67	12.50
2	Philadelphia Wings – x	6	3	3	.500	2.0	2–1	1–2	86	82	+4	14.33	13.67
3	Washington Wave – x	6	2	4	.333	3.0	1–2	1–2	83	97	−14	13.83	16.17
4	Baltimore Thunder – x	6	2	4	.333	3.0	1–2	1–2	79	82	−3	13.17	13.67

x: Clinched playoff berth; c: Clinched playoff berth by crossing over to another division; y: Clinched division; z: Clinched best regular season record; GP: Games Played
W: Wins; L: Losses; GB: Games back; PCT: Win percentage; Home: Record at Home; Road: Record on the Road; GF: Goals scored; GA: Goals allowed
Differential: Difference between goals scored and allowed; GF/GP: Average number of goals scored per game; GA/GP: Average number of goals allowed per game

== Playoffs ==
Semifinals
1	New Jersey	9
4	Baltimore	14
2	Philadelphia	15
3	Washington	20

Championship
3	Washington	10
4	Baltimore	11

== Awards ==
Award	Winner	Team
Championship Game MVP	Buzz Sheain	Baltimore

== Statistics leaders ==
Stat	Player	Team	Number
Goals	Mike French	Philadelphia	14
Assists	John Tucker	Philadelphia	14
	John Lamon	Washington	14
Points	John Tucker	Philadelphia	26
Shots on Goal	Paul French	Philadelphia	49

== Attendance ==
=== Regular season ===
Home team	Home games	Average attendance	Total attendance
Philadelphia Wings	3	11,953	35,860
Washington Wave	3	8,305	24,916
Baltimore Thunder	3	6,737	20,212
New Jersey Saints	3	6,059	18,176
League	12	8,264	99,164

=== Playoffs ===
Home team	Home games	Average attendance	Total attendance
New Jersey Saints	1	9,015	9,015
Philadelphia Wings	1	8,027	8,027
Washington Wave	1	7,019	7,019
League	2	8,020	24,061

== See also ==
- 1987 in sports
- 1987 Philadelphia Wings
