= Bryan Barrett =

American lacrosse player

Personal information
- Nationality: American
- Born: December 22, 1977 (age 48)
- Height: 6 ft 1 in (185 cm)
- Weight: 220 lb (100 kg; 15 st 10 lb)

Sport
- Position: Defense
- NLL teams: Orlando Titans; Philadelphia Wings
- NCAA team: University of Delaware
- Pro career: 2002–

Bryan Barrett (born December 22, 1977) is a professional lacrosse player.

Barrett is a graduate of University of Delaware. While at Delaware, his team was the 2000 Pre-Season All-American, named First Team All-American East in 2001, was the America East All-Tournament Team in 2001, and received an Inside Lacrosse Honorable Mention in 2000. He also served as team captain in 2000 and 2001.

Originally signed as a free agent by the Philadelphia Wings Barrett was traded to the New York Titans prior to the 2007 NLL season for a fourth round draft pick.
