= Philadelphia Wings (1974–1975) =

Defunct professional lacrosse team

The Philadelphia Wings was one of six teams from the original National Lacrosse League. This team mimicked Philadelphia's NHL counterpart, the Flyers with a "Broad Street Bullies" style of play. The Wings played at the home of the Flyers, the Spectrum, and played their first game in that arena on May 19, 1974, mere hours after the Flyers won the Stanley Cup. The Wings were one of three teams that did not go bankrupt prior to the 1976 season cancellation.

There were two seasons in the league. The regular season, which lasted 40 games in 1974 and 48 in 1975, took place during the NHL's off-season. Four of the six clubs qualified for the two-round playoffs in both seasons. It was a best-of-seven series in each round.

The Wings were regular season champions in the first season (1974). After defeating the Maryland Arrows in the first round, they were eliminated in the final round by the Rochester Griffins four games to two in the first season. They failed to make the playoffs with a disappointing fifth-place finish (they missed the playoffs by one win).

The 1974–75 NLL is unrelated to the modern-day National Lacrosse League, which also included two iterations of a team called the Philadelphia Wings. This was the only original league logo resurrected in the rebirth of pro indoor lacrosse. The current NLL league and franchise makes no references to the original incarnation although in 2004 there was a "retro" night in Philadelphia where the Wings wore the original orange jersey and the Rochester Knighthawks donned the Rochester Griffins jersey. Members of the original Wings were honored at a ceremony at half-time.

The players included Doug Favell (NHL goalie), John Grant Sr., the only player to play for the first two versions of the NLL Wings and father of John Grant Jr., Jimmy Wasson, goalkeeper Wayne Platt, Zeny Lipinski, long-time Lower Merion lacrosse coach John Linehan and Canadian lacrosse Hall of Famer Larry Lloyd. Flyer's television announcer Gene Hart called the games for the Wings.

== 1974 Players ==
Name	GP	G	A	Pts	PIM
Tom Buckley	4	1	0	1	2
Carm Collins	23	22	24	46	97
Mike Collins	34	26	15	41	78
Doug Favell	18	9	7	16	23
Glen Ferguson	30	13	18	31	15
Larry Ferguson	40	36	49	85	22
Keith Goebey	10	0	0	0	0
Bob Goulding	39	38	52	90	36
John Grant Sr.	39	78	105	183	26
John Hamilton	19	0	7	7	0
Jim Hickey	23	7	12	19	0
Jim Hinkson	26	19	27	46	18
Paul Jones	16	3	5	8	4
Joe Krasnaj	38	23	42	65	110
John Linehan	4	0	0	0	2
Zeny Lipinski Sr.	40	29	49	74	123
Larry Lloyd	40	82	91	173	39
Terry Lloyd	40	77	34	111	27
Doug Maynard	10	7	9	16	7
Ian Montgomery	25	7	18	25	4
Joe Musical	6	0	0	0	0
Tim O'Grady	25	8	17	25	36
Ted Peters	4	0	1	1	0
Wayne Platt	35	0	47	47	4
Barry Richardson	21	5	16	21	23
Brian Robinson	36	61	63	124	20
Terry Rowland	24	32	33	65	68
Adock Shenandoah	1	0	0	0	0
Jim Vilneff	28	7	17	24	36
Jim Wasson	34	37	57	94	16

== 1975 Players ==
Name	GP	G	A	Pts	PIM
Carm Collins	46	28	28	56	197
Mike Collins	2	2	0	2	2
Glen Ferguson	19	6	9	15	14
Larry Ferguson	18	18	24	42	6
Bob Goulding	34	14	32	46	57
John Grant Sr.	47	64	134	198	52
John Hamilton	25	0	7	7	0
Jim Hickey	35	2	23	25	28
Zeny Lipinski Sr.	46	26	63	89	178
Larry Lloyd	44	68	76	144	46
Terry Lloyd	48	113	56	169	54
Ted Peters	22	1	1	2	2
Wayne Platt	36	0	49	49	2
Brian Robinson	3	1	2	3	2
Terry Rowland	9	11	5	16	19
Jim Wasson	48	78	68	146	60

KEY:
GP = Games Played
G = Goals Scored
A = Assists
Pts = Points
PIM = Penalties In Minutes

== See also ==
Lacrosse in Pennsylvania
