= Keith Cromwell =

American professional lacrosse player

Personal information
- Nationality: American
- Born: September 7, 1979 (age 46)
- Height: 6 ft 1 in (185 cm)
- Weight: 205 lb (93 kg; 14 st 9 lb)

Sport
- Position: Forward
- Shoots: Left
- NLL draft: 19th overall, 2001; Columbus Landsharks
- NLL team Former teams: Calgary Roughnecks; Philadelphia Wings Minnesota Swarm New York Titans
- MLL team Former teams: Long Island Lizards; Philadelphia Barrage
- NCAA team: Rutgers University
- Pro career: 2001–2011

Keith Cromwell (born September 7, 1979) is an American professional lacrosse player. He was a member of the Minnesota Swarm in the National Lacrosse League and of the Long Island Lizards of Major League Lacrosse. He played the attack position. He graduated from Rutgers University in 2001. Cromwell was also hired in 2007 by Manhasset High School as the Boys Varsity Lacrosse Offensive Coordinator.

Keith Cromwell played at Rutgers from 1998 to 2001, posting one of the most accomplished careers in Rutgers lacrosse history. Cromwell is the leading scorer in school history, totaling 152 goals and 266 points. He also recorded 114 assists, which is third in program history. He totaled at least 65 points in three seasons, while scoring 42 and 44 goals in his sophomore and junior campaigns. All of those marks rank among the top-10 single season performances in Rutgers history.

The Hicksville, N.Y., native was a three-time USILA Lacrosse All-American, capping his career with First Team All-American honors in 2001 after Second Team and Honorable Mention selections the previous two seasons. He was a two-time team captain and four-time winner of the team's William Miller Trophy, given to the player who made the greatest contribution to the team during the season. Cromwell also earned the Coursen Award (Outstanding Male Athlete) from the Rutgers athletic department in 2001.

After his collegiate career, Cromwell was the seventh overall selection in the inaugural Major League Lacrosse Draft. He was named MLL Rookie of the Year in 2001 and went on to play 12 seasons in the league, ranking in the top five all-time in assists. He also has spent years as a lacrosse coach, including spending the 2011-12 season as an assistant at Rutgers. In 2013, he was inducted into the Long Island Lacrosse Hall of Fame.

Keith still regularly returns to his alma mater Rutgers to spread his wisdom among the players at Rutgers. He regularly returns to give speeches for alumni weekend at Rutgers.

== Professional career ==
Cromwell was drafted by Bridgeport Barrage in 2001. He won the MLL rookie of the year that season. He was a member of the MLL championship team Philadelphia Barrage in 2004. He did not play in 2005. Before the 2006 MLL season, his rights were traded to Long Island Lizards where he is currently playing.

== Statistics ==
=== NLL ===
		Regular Season						Playoffs
Season	Team	GP	G	A	Pts	LB	PIM	GP	G	A	Pts	LB	PIM
2002	Philadelphia	15	9	19	28	43	0	1	1	1	2	1	0
2003	Philadelphia	16	23	34	57	31	2	--	--	--	--	--	--
2004	Philadelphia	15	19	38	57	47	2	--	--	--	--	--	--
2005	Philadelphia	16	24	43	67	57	9	--	--	--	--	--	--
2006	Philadelphia	15	12	27	39	39	2	--	--	--	--	--	--
2007	Philadelphia	10	7	17	24	27	0	--	--	--	--	--	--
2008	Philadelphia	2	0	3	3	6	0	--	--	--	--	--	--
2008	Minnesota	4	5	5	10	1	0	--	--	--	--	--	--
NLL totals		93	99	186	285	251	15	1	1	1	2	1	0

=== MLL ===
		Regular Season							Playoffs
Season	Team	GP	G	2ptG	A	Pts	LB	PIM	GP	G	2ptG	A	Pts	LB	PIM
2001	Bridgeport	11	15	0	6	21	0	1	-	-	-	-	-	-	-
2002	Bridgeport	14	19	1	14	34	0	0	-	-	-	-	-	-	-
2003	Bridgeport	12	16	3	12	31	0	2	-	-	-	-	-	-	-
2004	Philadelphia	11	27	2	24	53	0	2.5	2	4	0	2	6	6	0
2006	Long Island	12	17	5	16	38	1	1	-	-	-	-	-	-	-
2007	Long Island	11	16	1	16	33	1	1	-	-	-	-	-	-	-
2008	Long Island	11	21	2	17	40	26	2	-	-	-	-	-	-	-
2009	Long Island	11	9	1	8	18	4	0.5	1	1	0	1	2	0	0
MLL Totals		93	140	15	113	268	32	10	3	5	0	3	8	6	0

== Awards ==
Preceded by None	MLL Rookie of the Year; 2001	Succeeded by Conor Gill
