= Philadelphia Wings =

NLL professional box lacrosse team

- Sport: Box lacrosse
- First season: 1987 (first iteration); 2018 (second iteration)
- Last season: 2014 (first iteration); 2026 (second iteration)
- League: National Lacrosse League
- Location: Philadelphia, Pennsylvania
- Arena: Xfinity Mobile Arena
- Colors: Black, charcoal, red, gold
- Owner: Comcast Spectacor
- Head coach: Ian Rubel
- General manager: Paul Day
- League titles: 6 (1989, 1990, 1994, 1995, 1998, 2001)
- Division titles: 6 (1993, 1994, 1995, 1996, 1997, 1998)
- Website: wingslax.com

The Philadelphia Wings were an American professional box lacrosse team based in Philadelphia, Pennsylvania, that competed in the National Lacrosse League (NLL) from 1987 to 2014, and again from 2018 to 2026.

The Wings were founded in 1987 as one of four original teams in the Eagle Pro Box Lacrosse League, now known as the NLL.

After the 2014 season, the Wings relocated to Uncasville, Connecticut, after 28 seasons in Philadelphia. The franchise rebranded to the New England Black Wolves.

In September 2017, the National Lacrosse League announced that Comcast Spectacor would be the owner of an expansion franchise for the 2018–19 season. The new franchise took on the Wings name as a nod to Philadelphia lacrosse history. The second iteration of the Wings ceased operations after the 2026 season.

The Wings are tied for the most titles in the league's history with six: four North American Cups in the Major Indoor Lacrosse League (MILL) era, followed by two Champion's Cups in 1998 and 2001.

== History ==
=== Early years ===
The Philadelphia Wings were one of the original four franchises in the Eagle Pro Box Lacrosse League, joining the New Jersey Saints, Washington Wave, and Baltimore Thunder in the premiere season. While the Wings were not an immediate success on the floor, going 3–3 and 3–5 in the first two regular seasons with two playoff losses, they were the biggest draw in the league. They drew an average of almost 12,000 fans to their three 1987 regular season games, and slightly over 12,000 fans for their four games in 1988.

Their first on-field success came in 1989 with a first place 6–2 campaign, ending with their first of a league record 6 titles with an 11–10 win over New York at the Spectrum. The Wings became the first team to repeat with another 6–2 regular season followed by a championship win in Worcester over the New England Blazers. A 5–5 season in 1991 left the Wings in third place in the American Division, one game behind the division winners Baltimore and out of the playoffs for the first time in their history, denying them the opportunity for a "threepeat."

Some of the early stars of those teams included Mike French, Hall of Fame college player at Cornell and a current team executive; John Grant Sr., father of current NLL star John Grant Jr. and member of the Philadelphia Wings (1974–1975); Syracuse Hall of Famer Brad Kotz; long time Wings coach, Tony Resch; and long time NLL player and coach John Tucker.

=== Wings vs. Bandits ===
In 1992, the league, which was known as the Major Indoor Lacrosse League (MILL) during the 1989 through 1997 seasons, expanded to Western New York with the Buffalo Bandits. The Bandits were primarily Canadian players from Ontario, while the Wings were still mostly American based, like the rest of the league at the time. The rivalry was instant, as the teams would play each other in 4 of the next 5 title games, interrupted only by the Wings triumph over Rochester in the 1995 season. The Wings struggled in the regular season of 1992 but turned it on in the playoffs to defeat Baltimore and New York and host the Bandits in the championship game. John Tavares would end the Wings quest for their 3rd title with an overtime winner, however.

1993 saw the Wings have a 7–1 season, only to be topped by the Bandits perfect 8–0 season. Both teams dispatched their semifinal opponents, and the rematch was on. The Bandits once again ended the Wings hopes, this time winning a one-goal contest in regulation 13–12.

1994 saw both teams top their respective divisions with 6–2 marks, and again both teams dominated the semifinal game to meet for a 3rd consecutive time for the North American Cup. An incredible run by Philadelphia in the middle of the game buried the Bandits hopes of their own threepeat, giving the Wings a 26–15 win and their third title.

The Wings were their same dominating selves in 1995, going 7–1 to finish atop the single table (a structure the league changed back to before the season), while the Bandits uncharacteristically struggled, finishing just 4th in a 6 team league at 3–5. This meant the Wings faced the Bandits in the semifinals, and due to the MILL's "attendance rule" that gave postseason home field advantage to the team with better attendance, the game was played in Buffalo. The Wings proved to be the better team with a 19–16 win on their way to a league high 4th title.

1996 saw the Bandits return to their prior form, while both teams finishing 8–2 and tied atop the league standings. Once again, the teams found themselves in the final, and the Bandits returned the favor of stopping a threepeat with a dominating 15–10 performance.

1997 saw the Wings move from the Spectrum to the new CoreStates Center. It would also be the first time that the Wings and Bandits would not meet in the playoffs since the Bandits had been introduced in 1992. The Wings won another regular season title with a 7–1 record, but were upset in the semifinals by the eventual champion Rochester Knighthawks.

=== NLL era ===
The league name changed for 1998, but the Wings success did not. Despite the loss of Gary Gait to the Baltimore Thunder, the Wings still claimed their 4th regular season title in 5 years at 9–3. Once again, the Wings were paired up with their arch-rival Bandits in the semifinal round, and the Wings dispatched the Bandits just as they had in the previous semifinal matchup. The Wings advanced to play the Thunder and Gary Gait in the final round, which was a best 2 of 3 series for the one and only time in league history. The Wings opened the series with a 16–12 victory at home, before sweeping the series with a dominating 17–12 road victory in Baltimore Arena. Wings goaltender Dallas Eliuk was named Championship Series MVP.

1999 saw the end of the heated Wings–Bandits rivalry, as the Bandits started to rebuild and fell to a 4–8 mark, missing the postseason. The Wings also had regular season struggles, finishing at just 5–7 and squeaking into the playoffs as the fourth seed. Wings fans probably wish the team had missed the postseason, as the team was pummeled in a record breaking 13–2 loss to the eventual champion Toronto Rock. 2000 saw the team improve slightly to 7–5 during the season, but it ended the same way, with a semifinal loss in Toronto by a more respectable 14–10 score.

That set up the 2001 season, with the Wings once again seeing their league dominance challenged by a newcomer to the league. The Rock and the Wings did not disappoint, with the Rock going 11–3 and the Wings 10–4 in the regular season, and winning their semifinal games to set up a third straight postseason matchup in Toronto, this time with the title on the line. Unlike the previous two games, the Wings dictated the style of play, combined with the stellar goaltending of 2001 Championship Game MVP Dallas Eliuk, built a 9–4 lead, and never looked back. The Rock made a late-game rally but it proved too little, too late, and the Wings claimed their 6th title with a 9–8 upset victory, silencing the 19,409 Toronto Fans in attendance.

The 2002 season was a transition year for the franchise, as they muddled through a difficult season to finish at 8–8 before falling in a quarterfinal game against the Washington Power. Until the 2008 season, it would prove to be the last playoff appearance for the franchise.

=== Rebuilding ===
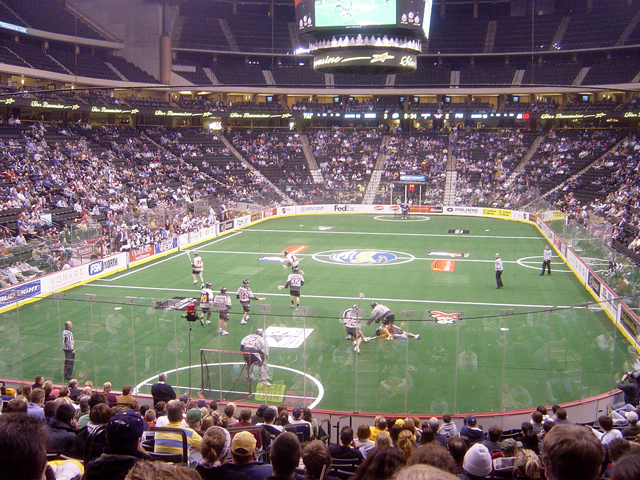
Philadelphia Wings at Minnesota Swarm in February 2006

The 2003 season saw the Wings start off strongly, but collapse down the stretch as they finished 8–8, and lost the division title to the Colorado Mammoth, missing the postseason for the first time since 1991. It would continue to get worse for the Wings, as the next two years ended with a last-place 7–9 2004 season and a 6–10 2005 season. The rebuilding of the Wings began in earnest in the offseason, with Perennial All-Pro Goaltender Dallas Eliuk being granted a trade request to be closer to home (due to his father's failing health), the Wings would have three first round draft picks before the 2006 season, adding Sean Greenhalgh, Luke Wiles, and Chad Thompson. Wiles and Thompson were later dealt for Mike Regan, and Greenhalgh was moved to Buffalo after the 2007 season. Despite the added firepower, the Wings saw some improvement, going 8–8 in 2006 but missing the postseason on tiebreakers.

The 2006 draft was again fertile ground for the Wings, adding Geoff Snider, Ian Llord, and Athan Iannucci in the first round, and adding Kyle Wailes, another first round pick, through a trade with Calgary. However, the 2007 season again would leave fans wondering about the future, when the Wings collapsed down the stretch with 4 losses in the last 5 games to crash to a 6–10 record and miss the playoffs for a fifth consecutive season. The entire coaching staff was fired after the season ended, though Lindsay Sanderson kept the role of GM.

=== Dave Huntley returns ===
The Wings' logo from 2002 to until their relocation in 2014

On June 8, 2007, the Wings announced that the team's original general manager Dave Huntley would be their head coach for the 2008 season. The personnel changes would continue as Sean Greenhalgh was moved to Buffalo and Ian Llord moved to Calgary in a deal that brought the Wings Jason Crosbie on offense and former Defenseman of the Year Taylor Wray on defense. The Wings added goaltender Rob Blasdell in the dispersal draft that occurred for the one-year suspension of the Arizona Sting, and he was named the starting goaltender for the 2008 season. On March 5, 2008, the Wings continued to restructure the team, even when leading the league with a 6–1 record at the halfway point. The Wings were involved in trades with the Chicago Shamrox, Minnesota Swarm, and Edmonton Rush leading to the acquisition of A.J. Shannon and Brandon Miller, while sending Matt Roik, Dan Marohl, Keith Cromwell, and Brad Self elsewhere.

All the changes paid off, as the Wings compiled a 10–6 record, good for a four-way tie for the Eastern Division championship. Due to tiebreakers, they finished with the 4th seed in the East, and travelled to Buffalo for an Eastern Division semifinal game on May 2, 2008. The Wings return to the postseason was short-lived, however, as the Wings dropped a 14–12 decision to the Bandits.

The 2008 season saw the emergence of two new Wings superstars, second year players Athan Iannucci and Geoff Snider. Iannucci scored 71 goals on the season, breaking Gary Gait's single-season scoring record of 61, and Snider set new records for loose balls (242), penalty minutes (103), and faceoffs won (318). Both made the All-Star team and All-Pro teams, and Iannucci was named Player of the Month three times as well as league MVP.

The 2009 season was marred by an offseason injury to star Athan Iannucci, who was only able to appear in 10 games, and compiled just 36 points after his record-breaking haul the season before. Needing to re-establish an offense without the focal point, the Wings struggled to a 2–5 start, but were able to rally to win 4 of the next 6 and get back to a 7–8 record heading into the season finale in Rochester with a playoff spot on the line. Back to back playoff berths were not to be, however, as the Wings fell to the Knighthawks 11–8 to finish the season 5th in the East.

=== 2011 ===
In 2011, after two seasons with Dave Huntley as coach, the Wings appointed former Wings player John Tucker to the head coaching position. After winning two championships with the Wings while they were in the Major Indoor Lacrosse League in 1989 and 1990, Tucker had success in coaching the now defunct Baltimore Thunder and Pittsburgh Crossefire.

2011 started out well for Tucker and the Wings. After a slow start at home against Boston and Buffalo, Philadelphia ended January on a 3-game winning streak, taking two games from Colorado, and blowing out Boston on the road. Strong play from Max Seibald and goaltender Brandon Miller highlighted these wins, and put the Wings half a game out of first place. Shortly thereafter, the Wings season began to crumble. After an up and down February, which saw Philadelphia split with Buffalo, and lose in Rochester, the season bottomed out, with the Wings losing 7 out of their last 8 games, and finishing with a 5–11 record, 5 and a half games out of first place and tied with Dave Huntley in 2010 for the worst season record of all time. In June 2011, Tucker announced he was stepping down from the head coaching position to focus on his position as the Wings new director of United States collegiate scouting efforts.

On July 25, 2011, current Wings general manager Johnny Mouradian became the team's new head coach. Mouradian had previously served as president, general manager, and advisor to the 2010 NLL Champs, the Washington Stealth. Mouradian wasted little time in shaping the 2012 season by trading Athan Iannucci to the Edmonton Rush with teammates Alex Turner and Brodie McDonald, along with Philadelphia's first round draft picks in 2012, 2013 and 2014. In exchange, the Wings acquired Edmonton transition player Brodie Merrill, Rush forwards Dean Hill, Mike McLellan, and Edmonton's 41st selection in the 2011 entry draft, and the 4th round selection in 2013.

=== Relocation ===
On July 11, 2014, the Philadelphia Wings announced through their internet website that the franchise was looking to relocate for the 2015 season. Citing the increasing saturation of the Philadelphia sports marketplace, "My love for the Wings and my connection with the city has made this move all the more difficult," said Wings owner and team president Michael French. "I would like to express my sincere gratitude to all of our Philadelphia supporters over the past 28 years."

"The financial model in a market with so many sport and entertainment alternatives has proven to be unsustainable," added French. "Finding a new venue with new strategic partners was the only way to ensure financial stability."

Despite being one of the oldest and most historic franchises in the league, attendance had begun to falter in the years before the Wings demise. Their attendance dropped 5% from 2011 to 2012 and then another 6% from 2012 to 2013. In February 2013 the Wings hosted a weekday game at 11 am, drawing the smallest attendance (5,139) in franchise history.

On August 4, 2014, it was reported that the Mohegan tribe would be purchasing an NLL team to play at the Mohegan Sun Arena in Uncasville, Connecticut. Two days later it was made official that French had sold half of the franchise to the Mohegans, and that the Wings would be relocating to Uncasville. The franchise would be renamed the New England Black Wolves.

=== Resurrection ===
On September 14, 2017, the NLL awarded an expansion franchise in Philadelphia to owner Comcast Spectacor. The franchise fee for Philadelphia and fellow expansion team San Diego Seals was a reported $5 million. On November 29, 2017, it was announced the new franchise would use the "Wings" name to pay homage to the history of indoor lacrosse in Philadelphia. The Wings played their first game on December 15, 2018 in a 17–15 loss against the Buffalo Bandits.

On March 30, 2026, the Wings announced the franchise would cease operations following the conclusion of the 2025–26 season.

On September 10, 2026, the NLL announced that the Wings and Ottawa Black Bears ceased operations and would not participate in the 2026-2027 NLL season. Furthermore, a dispersal draft was being held on September 15.

== Players ==
=== Roster ===
Philadelphia Wings roster
Active (21-man) roster		Inactive roster	Coaches
Goaltenders: 39 (Canada) Nick Damude; 30 (Canada) Deacan Knott; Defensemen: 12 (Canada) Liam Patten; 13 (Canada) Connor Sellars; 26 (United States) Isaiah Davis-Allen; 33 (Canada) Anthony Joaquim; 41 (Canada) Alex Pace; 94 (Canada) Ryan Wagner	Forwards: 92 (Canada) Sam LeClair; 19 (Canada) Phil Caputo; 19 (Canada) Holden Cattoni; 15 (United States) Joe Resetarits; 24 (Canada) Mitchell Jones; 34 (United States) Brennan O'Neill; 10 (United States) Blaze Riorden (C); 22 (United States) Michael Sowers; Transition: 7 (Canada) Tyler Burton; 13 (Canada) Scott Dominey; 2 (Canada) Tony Malcom; 96 (Canada) Mike McCannell; 67 (Canada) Jordan Stouros	Practice squad: 21 (United States) Dalton Young; 77 (United States) Kevin Lynch; 43 (Canada) Stone Jacobs; 20 (Canada) Nathan Fehr; Injured reserve: 73 (United States) Nicholas Rowlett; 6 (Canada) Mitchell Armstrong	Head coach: Ian Rubel; Assistant coaches: Landon Miller; Tracey Kelusky; Pat McCready; Rob Taylor; Legend: * Suspended list; (C) Captain; (A) Alternate captain; Roster updated 2019-02-20; NLL Transactions

=== Retired numbers ===
Philadelphia Wings retired numbers
No.	Player	Pos.	Career	Ref.
11	Kevin Finneran	MF	1993–2002	
35	Dallas Eliuk	GT	1991–2005	
42	Tom Marechek		1994–2005	
66	Jake Bergey		1998–2008	

== All-time record ==
Season	Conference	W–L	Finish	Home	Road	GF	GA	Coach	Playoffs
1987		3–3	2nd	2–1	1–2	86	82	Steve Wey	Lost in semifinals
1988		3–5	3rd	2–2	1–3	97	90	Steve Wey	Lost in semifinals
1989		6–2	1st	4–0	2–2	122	96	Dave Evans	Won Championship
1990		6–2	2nd	3–1	3–1	89	82	Dave Evans	Won Championship
1991	American	5–5	3rd	3–2	2–3	129	131	Dave Evans	Missed playoffs
1992	American	3–5	2nd	1–3	2–2	106	109	Dave Evans	Lost Championship
1993	American	7–1	1st	4–0	3–1	121	86	Dave Evans	Lost Championship
1994	American	6–2	1st	4–0	2–2	127	89	Tony Resch	Won Championship
1995		7–1	1st	4–0	3–1	115	94	Tony Resch	Won Championship
1996		8–2	T-1st	4–1	4–1	165	114	Tony Resch	Lost Championship
1997		7–3	1st	3–2	4–1	137	115	Tony Resch	Lost in semifinals
1998		9–3	1st	3–3	6–0	166	148	Tony Resch	Won Championship
1999		5–7	4th	4–2	1–5	153	153	Tony Resch	Lost in semifinals
2000		7–5	4th	4–2	3–3	172	165	Tony Resch	Lost in semifinals
2001		10–4	2nd	6–1	4–3	205	177	Tony Resch	Won Championship
2002	Eastern	8–8	2nd	6–2	2–6	222	237	Adam Mueller	Lost in quarterfinals
2003	Eastern	8–8	2nd	6–2	2–6	203	209	Adam Mueller	Missed playoffs
2004	Eastern	7–9	4th	3–5	4–4	192	198	Adam Mueller	Missed playoffs
2005	Eastern	6–10	4th	3–5	3–5	213	218	Lindsay Sanderson	Missed playoffs
2006	Eastern	8–8	5th	5–3	3–5	184	184	Lindsay Sanderson	Missed playoffs
2007	Eastern	6–10	6th	4–4	2–6	178	186	Lindsay Sanderson	Missed playoffs
2008	Eastern	10–6	4th	7–1	3–5	225	220	Dave Huntley	Lost in quarterfinals
2009	Eastern	7–9	5th	4–4	3–5	188	193	Dave Huntley	Missed playoffs
2010	Eastern	5–11	6th	3–5	2–6	168	194	Dave Huntley	Missed playoffs
2011	Eastern	5–11	5th	2–6	3–5	189	133	John Tucker	Missed playoffs
2012	Eastern	7–9	3rd	3–5	4–4	176	207	Johnny Mouradian	Lost in Division Semifinal
2013	Eastern	7–9	3rd	4–4	3–5	170	207	Johnny Mouradian	Lost in Division Semifinal
2014	Eastern	6–10	4th	2–7	4–3	202	218	Blaine Harrison	Missed Playoffs
2019	Eastern	4–14	6th	3–6	1–8	218	246	Paul Day	Did not qualify
2020	Eastern	8–6	3rd	3–3	5–3	151	134	Paul Day	No playoffs held
2021	Eastern	Season cancelled due to COVID-19 pandemic							
2022	Eastern	9–9	5th	4–5	5–4	185	199	Paul Day	Lost Conference Semi-finals
2023	Eastern	9–9	5th	4–5	5–4	200	211	Paul Day	Did not qualify
2024	Unified	6–12	13th	1–8	5–4	198	233	Paul Day	Did not qualify
2025	Unified	7–11	12th	4–5	3–6	207	231	Ian Rubel	Did not qualify
2026	Unified	5–13	14th	3–6	2–7	165	200	Ian Rubel	Did not qualify
Total	35 seasons	187–181		107–79	79–102	4,661	4,545		
Playoff totals		16–13		10–4	6–9	360	329		

== Playoff results ==
Season	Game	Visiting	Home
1987	Semifinals	Washington 20	Philadelphia 15
1988	Semifinals	Philadelphia 10	New Jersey 12
1989	Championship	New York 10	Philadelphia 11
1990	Semifinals	New York 8	Philadelphia 9
1990	Championship	Philadelphia 17	New England 7
1992	Division Semifinal	Baltimore 12	Philadelphia 14
1992	Division Final	Philadelphia 8	New York 6
1992	Championship	Buffalo 11	Philadelphia 10 (OT)
1993	Division Final	New York 9	Philadelphia 17
1993	Championship	Philadelphia 12	Buffalo 13
1994	Division Final	New York 7	Philadelphia 17
1994	Championship	Philadelphia 26	Buffalo 15
1995	Semifinals	Philadelphia 19	Buffalo 16
1995	Championship	Rochester 14	Philadelphia 15 OT
1996	Semifinals	Boston 8	Philadelphia 10
1996	Championship	Philadelphia 10	Buffalo 15
1997	Semifinals	Rochester 15	Philadelphia 13
1998	Semifinals	Buffalo 12	Philadelphia 17
1998	Championship (Game 1)	Baltimore 12	Philadelphia 16
1998	Championship (Game 2)	Philadelphia 17	Baltimore 12
1999	Semifinals	Philadelphia 2	Toronto 13
2000	Semifinals	Philadelphia 10	Toronto 14
2001	Semifinals	Rochester 11	Philadelphia 12
2001	Championships	Philadelphia 9	Toronto 8
2002	Quarterfinals	Washington 12	Philadelphia 11
2008	Division Semifinal	Philadelphia 12	Buffalo 14
2012	Division Semifinal	Philadelphia 13	Rochester 14
2013	Division Semifinal	Philadelphia 8	Rochester 10
2022	Conference Semifinals	Philadelphia 8	San Diego 9

== Awards and honors ==
Year	Player	Award
1989	John Tucker	Championship Game MVP
1990	Brad Kotz	Championship Game MVP
1994	Tom Marechek	Rookie of the Year
1994	Scott Montgomery	Championship Game MVP
1995	Gary Gait	Most Valuable Player
1995	Gary Gait	Championship Game MVP
1996	Gary Gait	Most Valuable Player
1997	Gary Gait	Most Valuable Player
1998	Dallas Eliuk	Champion's Cup MVP (series and game 1)
1998	Bill Miller	Champion's Cup MVP (game 2)
2001	Tony Resch	Coach of the Year
2001	Russ Cline	Executive of the Year
2001	Dallas Eliuk	Champion's Cup MVP
2006	Sean Greenhalgh	Sportsmanship Award
2008	Athan Iannucci	Most Valuable Player
2020	Paul Day	GM of the Year
2020	Paul Day	Les Bartley Award

=== NLL Hall of Fame members ===
- Scott Montgomery, Chris Fritz, Gary Gait, Paul Gait (Class of 2006)
- Mike French, Tom Marechek (Class of 2007)
- Tony Resch (Class of 2008)
- Dallas Eliuk (Class of 2009)
- Terry Sanderson (Class of 2015)
- Kevin Finneran (Class of 2021)

=== NLL records held ===
- Single Season Goal Scoring Record – Athan Iannucci (71 goals, 2008)
- Single Season Loose Balls Record – Geoff Snider (244 LB, 2008)
- Single Season Faceoff Wins Record – Peter Jacobs (318 FW, 2005) and Geoff Snider (318 FW, 2008)
- Single Season PIM Record – Geoff Snider (103 PIM, 2008)
- Most Goals in a Single Game – Paul Gait (10 goals, 26 March 1994)

== Head coaching history ==
#	Name	Term	Regular season				Playoffs			
#	Name	Term	GC	W	L	W%	GC	W	L	W%
1	Steve Wey	1987–1988	14	6	8	.429	2	0	2	.000
2	Dave Evans	1989–1993	42	27	15	.643	8	6	2	.750
3	Mike French	1994	8	6	2	.750	2	2	0	1.000
4	Tony Resch	1995–2001	78	53	25	.679	12	8	4	.667
5	Adam Mueller	2002–2004	48	23	25	.479	1	0	1	.000
6	Lindsay Sanderson	2005–2007	48	20	28	.417	–			
7	Dave Huntley	2008–2010	48	22	26	.458	1	0	1	.000
8	John Tucker	2011	16	5	11	.312	–			
9	Johnny Mouradian	2012–2013	32	14	18	.438	2	0	2	.000
10	Blane Harrison	2014	18	6	12	.333	–			
11	Paul Day	2019–2024	86	36	50	.419	1	0	1	.000%
12	Ian Rubel	2025–2026	36	12	24	.333	–			

== Fan support and traditions ==
Philadelphia fans were known for their passionate support of their team, and the less-than-hospitable treatment of opposing players. In a poll of the players, over 62% stated that Wings fans had screamed the filthiest and nastiest things at them in the league.

Of the fans, goaltender Rob Blasdell said "They truly are the best fans in the league. They're probably the most knowledgeable fans in the league. It would kind of be the same as playing for the Leafs in Toronto. They're very, very passionate." Philadelphia fans enjoy the physical aspect of the game, leading Geoff Snider to comment: "The Philly fans are great. They are very loyal and they get behind it. I got a standing ovation once for a roughing penalty. I'd never seen anything like that before."

Fans traditions started from the national anthem, when fans could be heard making a 'tsch' sound at the end of each line, mocking a recording that was used by the Wings in the early years where the only audible portion of the song was the cymbal crashes. During the introductions of the opposing team, each player's name was followed by a call of "sucks", a tradition that has been extended to the opposing coaches, trainers, and the game officials. The local shot clock operator had escaped the jeering, and was instead cheered.

During the game, the opposing goalie was often the target of fans' heckling. The most common chant was to remind the goalies "It's all your fault" after every goal they allow.

One of the more notable traditions was the dueling "W-I-N-G-S" cheers. The side of the arena with the penalty boxes was led by "Chopper", a Wings superfan with face paint and a hard hat, who was known around the league for making opposing players who found their way to the penalty box regret their time there. The bench side went through many leaders, from "Big Gabe" and the little gabesters (consisting of Matt Denker, Joshua Gross, Jordan Elsas, Adam David and Eli Goldstein) (father of Scott Gabrielson, a Wings captain in the 1990s) to "Big E" to Chasmo, and now "The Captain" and "Morpheus" or as he made himself known as during the second half of the game on February 29, 2008, "Doctor Lacrosse". The "kick butt baby" (Eric Kulb Martinez) was the biggest little fan even though he could barely talk. While the leader of the chants aren't always the same from year to year, the "W-I-N-G-S WINGS!" cheer has endured following the team's revival.

== See also ==
- Philadelphia Wings seasons
- 1974–75 Philadelphia Wings team
- Lacrosse in Pennsylvania

Preceded by New Jersey Saints	Major Indoor Lacrosse League Champions; 1989, 1990	Succeeded by Detroit Turbos
Preceded by Buffalo Bandits	Major Indoor Lacrosse League Champions; 1994, 1995	Succeeded by Buffalo Bandits
Preceded by Rochester Knighthawks (MILL)	National Lacrosse League Champions; 1998	Succeeded by Toronto Rock
Preceded by Toronto Rock	National Lacrosse League Champions; 2001	Succeeded by Toronto Rock
