= Larry Quinn (lacrosse) =

American lacrosse player

Personal information
- Nationality: American

Sport
- Position: Goaltender
- NLL teams: New Jersey Saints
- NCAA team: Johns Hopkins Blue Jays
- Pro career: 1987–1988

Career highlights
- 1984, 1985 NCAA Division I Men's Lacrosse Championship; 1984, 1985 Division I Goaltender of the Year; 1984, 1985 Division I National Player of the Year; 1986, 1990, 1994 World Lacrosse Championship Champions (United States); 1988 NLL Champions Cup Champion (New Jersey Saints); 2018 Tewaaraton Legend Award

Lawrence J. Quinn (born March 9, 1963) was an All-American lacrosse goaltender at the Johns Hopkins University from 1982 to 1985, leading the Johns Hopkins Blue Jays to the NCAA Men's Lacrosse Championship in 1984 and 1985, and two additional finals appearances in 1982 and 1983.

== Career ==
Quinn was high school All-American in Levittown N.Y., who twice won the Lt. Raymond Enners Award as the nation's top player. Quinn also won the Ensign C. Markland Kelly, Jr. Award in 1984 and 1985 as the nation's best goalie.

Quinn also won world championships with the U.S. National Team in 1986, 1990 and 1994. He played 11 years in the United States Club Lacrosse Association (USCLA), leading his team to three titles, and played two years in the MILL, winning a championship with the New Jersey Saints in 1988.

Quinn is one of only three goaltenders to win College National Player of the year. He holds the Johns Hopkins single-season (.708) and career (.673) records for save percentage.

Quinn was inducted into the National Lacrosse Hall of Fame in 2000.

Quinn is a partner at Tydings & Rosenberg LLP, and a recipient of the Maryland SuperLawyer designation.

In 2018 Larry Quinn was awarded the Tewaaraton Legend Award for his performance in college which at the time would have earned him the Tewaaraton Award for the best college player of the year.

== See also ==
- National Lacrosse Hall of Fame
- Johns Hopkins Blue Jays lacrosse
