= Tony Resch =

American lacrosse coach

Personal information
- Nationality: American

Sport
- Position: Defense
- Coached by: Philadelphia Wings (NLL) 1994 – 2001; Philadelphia Barrage (MLL) 2005 – 2008
- NLL teams: Philadelphia Wings
- Pro career: 1988–1993

Tony Resch is a retired lacrosse player, and current field and box lacrosse coach. He is the former head coach of the Philadelphia Wings of the National Lacrosse League from 1994 to 2001, and led the Wings to four Championships. Resch was named to the NLL Hall of Fame in 2008. Resch returned to coaching as the head coach of the Philadelphia Barrage of Major League Lacrosse. Resch graduated from Yale University, where he was a two-time All-American and three-time First Team All-Ivy League player.

Resch also won a gold medal in the 1990 World Lacrosse Championship held in Perth, Australia as a member of Team USA.

He is currently a guidance counselor at La Salle College High School, in Wyndmoor, Pennsylvania. He also serves as the Defensive Coordinator for the La Salle Lacrosse team, and assistant to head coach Jack Forster. La Salle has won five Pennsylvania State Championships during his coaching tenure. He resides in Flourtown, Pennsylvania with his wife, Mary, and their three sons, Patrick, Brendan, and Conor. Patrick played collegiate lacrosse at Dartmouth College as an undergraduate where he was a two-time captain, and later played at Duke University as a graduate student. Patrick currently plays for Chaos LC in the Premier Lacrosse League. Conor also played lacrosse at Yale University.

== NLL playing career ==
Resch played as a defenseman with the Philadelphia Wings of the National Lacrosse League for six seasons, and was Team Captain for three seasons. He scored 12 goals and was credited with 10 assists during his playing career. He was a member of the MILL Championship Philadelphia Wings teams in 1989 season and 1990 season.

== NLL coaching career ==
Resch was the Wings Head Coach from 1994 to 2001. Under the guidance of Resch, the Wings went to the playoffs every season he was head coach, and won the Championship in 1994, 1995, 1998, and 2001. As Head Coach of the Wings, Resch had a 59–27 regular season record.

== MLL coaching career ==
Resch joined the Philadelphia Barrage of Major League Lacrosse as head coach in 2005. In his first season as coach, the team finished 4–8, and missed the playoffs.

In his second season as Head Coach in 2006, Resch led the Barrage to the Major League Lacrosse Championship while finishing the regular season 10–2. The Barrage were repeat champions in 2007 with a record of 9–3.

Resch was an Assistant Coach for the Baltimore/Chesapeake Bayhawks during Championship seasons in 2002, 2012, and 2013.

== International ==
In addition to earning a Gold Medal as a player in the 1990 World Lacrosse Championship, Resch was an Assistant Coach for the gold medal-winning USA National Teams in 2010 in Manchester, England and 2018 in Netanya, Israel. He was also the Head Coach of the 2015 USA Indoor Team, that earned a bronze medal at the 2015 World Indoor Lacrosse Championship played on the Onondaga Reservation in New York.

== Awards ==
In 2001, Resch was presented with the inaugural NLL Coach of the Year award. The award was renamed to the Les Bartley Award in 2004. In 2006 and 2008, Resch was awarded the Warrior Major League Lacrosse Coach of the Year Award. Resch was inducted into the National Lacrosse League Hall of Fame in February, 2008. He was elected to the Pennsylvania Sports Hall of Fame City All Star Chapter in 2011 and the Montgomery County Chapter in 2018.

== MILL/NLL head coaching statistics ==
Team	Season	Regular Season				Playoffs				Playoff result
Team	Season	GC	W	L	W%	GC	W	L	W%	Playoff result
Philadelphia Wings	1994	8	6	2	.750	2	2	0	1.000	Won North American Cup (BUF)
Philadelphia Wings	1995	8	7	1	.875	2	2	0	1.000	Won North American Cup (ROC)
Philadelphia Wings	1996	10	8	2	.800	2	1	1	.500	Lost North American Cup (BUF)
Philadelphia Wings	1997	10	7	3	.700	1	0	1	.000	Lost Semifinals (ROC)
Philadelphia Wings	1998	12	9	3	.750	3	3	0	1.000	Won Champions' Cup (BAL)
Philadelphia Wings	1999	12	5	7	.417	1	0	1	.000	Lost Semifinals (TOR)
Philadelphia Wings	2000	12	7	5	.583	1	0	1	.000	Lost Semifinals (TOR)
Philadelphia Wings	2001	14	10	4	.714	2	2	0	1.000	Won Champions' Cup (TOR)
Totals:	8	86	59	27	.686	14	10	4	.714	

== See also ==
- Lacrosse in Pennsylvania

Preceded by none	NLL Coach of the Year Award; 2001	Succeeded by Bob McMahon
Preceded by Scott Hiller	Major League Lacrosse Coach of the Year Award; 2006, 2008	Succeeded by John Tucker
