= New Jersey Saints =

- Sport: Box lacrosse
- Founded: 1987
- First season: 1987
- Last season: 1988
- League: Eagle Pro Box Lacrosse League
- Location: East Rutherford, New Jersey
- Arena: Brendan Byrne Arena
- Championships: 1 (1988)
- Division titles: 1 (1987)
- Later: New York Saints (1989–2003)

The New Jersey Saints were one of the founding teams in the Eagle Pro Box Lacrosse League (renamed in 1989 to the Major Indoor Lacrosse League, and then again in 1998 to the National Lacrosse League). They played at the Brendan Byrne Arena in East Rutherford, New Jersey. The Saints won the 1988 Eagle Pro championship. After the 1988 season, they moved to Long Island, New York and became the New York Saints.

== Awards and honors ==
Year	Player	Award
1988	Larry Quinn	Championship Game MVP (tie)
1988	Jeff Goldberg	Championship Game MVP (tie)

== All time record ==
Season	W-L	Finish	Home	Road	GF	GA	Coach	Playoffs
1987	5–1	1st	3–0	2–1	88	75	Bob Engelke	Lost in semifinals
1988	5–3	2nd	3–1	2–2	127	112	Bob Engelke	Won Championship
Total	10–4		6–1	4–3	215	187	1 championship	

== Playoff results ==
Season	Game	Visiting	Home
1987	Semifinals	Baltimore 14	New Jersey 9
1988	Semifinals	Philadelphia 10	New Jersey 12
1988	Championships	New Jersey 17	Washington 16

== Championships ==
Preceded by Baltimore Thunder	Eagle Pro Box Lacrosse League Champions; 1988	Succeeded by Philadelphia Wings
