= John Tucker (lacrosse) =

American lacrosse coach

Personal information
- Nationality: American

Sport
- Position: Forward
- NLL teams: Philadelphia Wings (NLL) 1987 to 1994 (as a player) 2009 to 2011 (as a coach); Pittsburgh CrosseFire 2000; Baltimore Thunder (NLL) 1997 to 1999
- MLL teams: Atlanta Blaze (MLL) 2016 (fired mid-season); Boston Cannons (MLL 2009 to 2015; Los Angeles Riptide (MLL) 2006 to 2008
- Former NCAA team: Johns Hopkins University
- Pro career: 1987–1993

John Tucker is a retired American professional lacrosse player, and former head coach of the Boston Cannons and Atlanta Blaze of the now defunct MLL. He was also the head coach of the Philadelphia Wings of the National Lacrosse League. He was elected into the National Lacrosse League Hall of Fame in 2010 and into the National Lacrosse Hall of Famee in 2016.

== Playing career ==
Tucker began his lacrosse playing career in ninth grade, joining the junior league team at Archbishop Curley High School under Coach Joe D'Adamo. He was a freshman and sophomore on the team during the school's 1976 and 1977 championship seasons, and he graduated from Curley in 1979. As a collegiate player, Tucker was a member on a number of winning teams. He played on the undefeated Johns Hopkins University Blue Jays team that won the NCAA Men's Lacrosse Championship in 1984. In international competition Tucker played for Team USA in winning three gold medals at the World Lacrosse Championships in 1986, 1990, 1994. Tucker captained the 1990 and 1994 teams. In addition, Tucker won two championships with the Philadelphia Wings of the Major Indoor Lacrosse League in 1989 and 1990. Tucker played at the amateur level for the storied Maryland Lacrosse Club winning three USILA Club championships. He is enshrined in both the NLL and US Lacrosse Hall of Fame. Tucker was also an outstanding football player for the Blue Jays. In 1983 he was named to the all-state team and was all-Centennial Conference for his performance as a tight end. He holds the Centennial Conference record for both receptions and total yards in a season by a tight end.

== Coaching career ==
As a coach, he has led a number of teams to championships, including a total of four Maryland Interscholastic Athletic Association championships: three with the Gilman School in Baltimore, Maryland, and one with Loyola Blakefield in Towson, Maryland.

In the National Lacrosse League, Tucker coached the Baltimore Thunder from 1997 to 1999. He also was the coach of the Pittsburgh CrosseFire for their one year of existence in 2000.

Tucker served as Head Coach of the Los Angeles Riptide of Major League Lacrosse from 2006 to 2008 compiling a 22–14 record. Following the 2007 MLL season he was awarded the Major League Lacrosse Coach of the Year Award. With the folding of the Riptide, Tucker signed a two-year deal to coach the Washington Bayhawks beginning in 2009.

In October 2009, Tucker was an assistant coach with his original NLL team from the 1980s, the Wings. After a dismal 2010 campaign under head coach Dave Huntley, when the Wings had their worst ever record (5–11), the team fired the coaching staff, eventually hiring Tucker back as the head coach. In June 2011, Tucker stepped down to assume a scouting position within the Wings organization.

In 2011, Tucker came full circle and accepted the head coach position of his alma mater, Archbishop Curley High School. Assisting him on defense was his own former coach, Joe D'Adamo. He worked as an admissions at Concordia Prep in Towson, Maryland.

Tucker was named Head Coach of the Boston Cannons (MLL) in 2013 and was named, for a second time, Brine Coach of the Year in 2015.

Following the end of the 2015 season on September 8, it was announced that Tucker would not re-sign to coach the Boston Cannons for the 2016 season. Tucker instead opted to coach the expansion Atlanta Blaze. After a dismal 3–7 start the Blaze fired Tucker and associate head coach Dave Huntley assumed the head coaching job.

Tucker is now the head coach of the varsity boys lacrosse team at Saint James School in Hagerstown, Maryland, where he also works as the Director of Admissions & Enrollment Management.

== Statistics ==
=== Major Indoor Lacrosse League career ===
	Regular Season						Playoffs
	GP	G	A	Pts	LB	PIM	GP	G	A	Pts	LB	PIM
1987	--	12	14	26	--	--	--	--	--	--	--	--
1988	--	18	16	34	--	--	--	--	--	--	--	--
1989	--	11	24	35	--	--	--	--	--	--	--	--
1990	--	27	15	42	--	--	--	--	--	--	--	--
1991	--	32	18	50	--	--	--	--	--	--	--	--
Totals	47	100	87	187	207	64	6	8	16	24	26	15

- Philadelphia Wings stats only (may not be complete)

=== MILL/NLL head coaching statistics ===
Team	Season	Regular Season				Playoffs				Playoff result
Team	Season	GC	W	L	W%	GC	W	L	W%	Playoff result
Baltimore Thunder	1997	10	2	8	.200	–	–	–	–	Did not qualify
Baltimore Thunder	1998	12	8	4	.667	3	2	1	.667	Lost Champions' Cup (PHI)
Baltimore Thunder	1999	12	8	4	.667	1	0	1	.000	Lost Semifinal (ROC)
Pittsburgh CrosseFire	2000	12	6	6	.500	–	–	–	–	Did not qualify
Philadelphia Wings	2011	16	5	11	.313	–	–	–	–	Did not qualify
Totals:	5	62	29	33	.468	4	2	2	.500	

== See also ==
- Philadelphia Wings
- 1987 Philadelphia Wings season

== Notes and references ==
Preceded by Tony Resch	Major League Lacrosse Coach of the Year Award; 2007	Succeeded by Incumbent
