= Washington Wave =

Defunct American lacrosse team

The Washington Wave was an American lacrosse team that competed in the Eagle Pro Box Lacrosse League and the Major Indoor Lacrosse League from 1987 to 1989. They were based in Washington, D.C., and played in the Capital Centre in Landover, Maryland.

Coaching and Players

The team's first coach was Bud Beardmore, a respected former coach who had previously won two national titles with the Maryland Terrapins. Notable players for the Washington Wave included Brad Kotz and Frank Urso.

== All time record ==
Season	Division	W-L	Finish	Home	Road	GF	GA	Coach	Playoffs
1987		2-4	3rd	1-2	1-2	83	97	Bud Beardmore	Lost Championship
1988		6-2	1st	4-0	2-2	121	119	Glen Little	Lost Championship
1989		1-7	6th	0-4	1-3	80	102	Glen Little	Missed playoffs
Total	3 seasons	9-13		5-6	4-7	284	318		

== Playoff results ==
Season	Game	Visiting	Home
1987	Semifinals	Washington 20	Philadelphia 15
1987	Championship	Baltimore 11	Washington 10
1988	Championship	New Jersey 17	Washington 16
