= Dallas Eliuk =

Canadian lacrosse player and coach (born 1964)

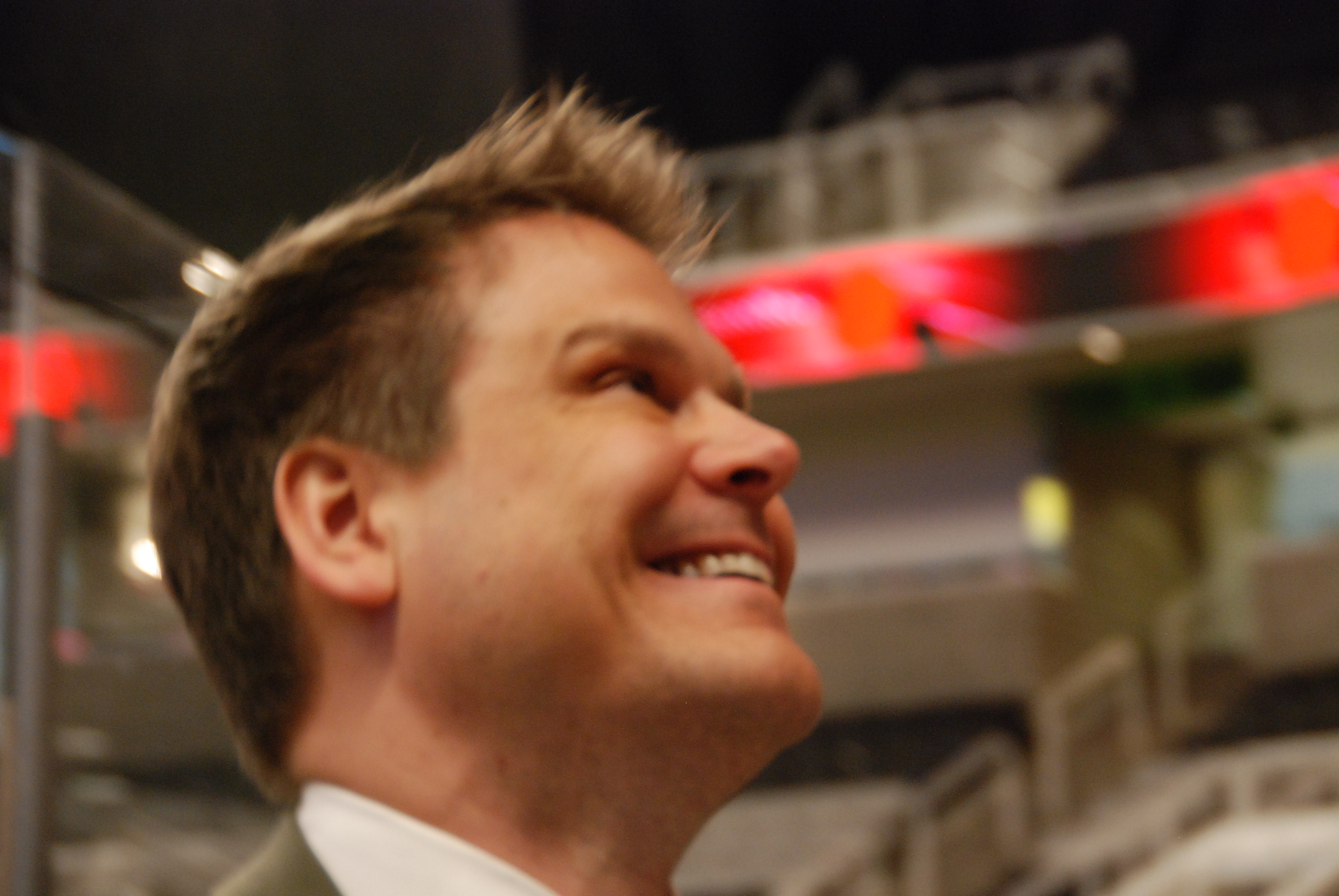

Personal information
- Nickname: Dally-Lama
- Nationality: Canadian
- Born: November 4, 1964 (age 61) Vancouver, British Columbia, Canada
- Height: 5 ft 10 in (178 cm)
- Weight: 195 lb (88 kg; 13 st 13 lb)

Sport
- Position: Goaltender
- Shoots: Right
- NLL teams: Portland LumberJax; Philadelphia Wings
- Pro career: 1991–2008

Dallas Eliuk (born November 4, 1964, in Vancouver, British Columbia) is a Canadian former professional box lacrosse goaltender and assistant coach in the National Lacrosse League. Upon his retirement from play, Eliuk coached one season with the Portland LumberJax and two with the Colorado Mammoth. Dallas played for 18 years, 15 seasons for the Philadelphia Wings before being traded to the LumberJax (per his request), where he played for three seasons. Eliuk won four championships with the Wings, two championship MVP awards, was named to the All-Pro team nine times, and retired as the league's all-time leader in saves. Because of his success, his longevity, and unparalleled acrobatic athleticism, he is considered a legend in indoor lacrosse, and widely regarded as the best goalie to ever to play the game.

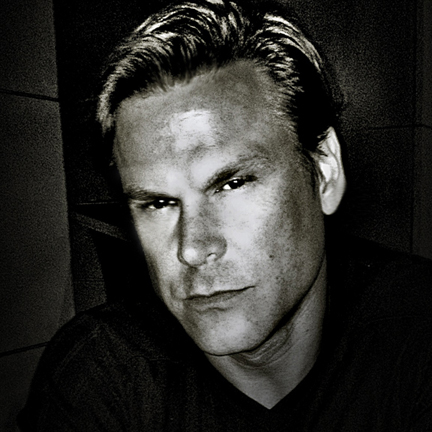

Eliuk was inducted into the Canadian Lacrosse Hall of Fame November 2013. Eliuk and Jim Veltman were inducted into the National Lacrosse League Hall of Fame in March, 2009.

In January 2005, when the Wings were in Anaheim for a game against the Storm, several members of the team, including Eliuk, went to a taping of the game show The Price Is Right. Eliuk was chosen to participate, and won a world-map lithograph, some dinnerware, and an exercise machine. The episode aired on February 11, 2005.

Eliuk married former Radio D.J. Daria O'Neill on December 31, 2007. Their first child Xander Eliuk was born in May 2009.

== Statistics ==
=== NLL ===
		Regular Season						Playoffs
Season	Team	GP	Min	GA	Sv	GAA	Sv %	GP	Min	GA	Sv	GAA	Sv %
1991	Philadelphia	10	0	0	0	0	--	--	--	--	--	--	--
1992	Philadelphia	8	448	102	312	13.66	75.36%	3	142	21	96	8.87	82.05%
1993	Philadelphia	8	443	89	274	12.05	75.48%	2	92	14	52	9.13	78.79%
1994	Philadelphia	7	316	62	211	11.77	77.29%	2	109	21	67	11.56	76.14%
1995	Philadelphia	7	391	68	240	10.43	77.92%	2	121	30	72	14.88	70.59%
1996	Philadelphia	10	502	91	284	10.88	75.73%	2	119	23	80	11.60	77.67%
1997	Philadelphia	8	476	81	299	10.21	78.68%	1	60	15	35	15.00	70.00%
1998	Philadelphia	12	636	133	435	12.55	76.58%	3	177	35	108	11.86	75.52%
1999	Philadelphia	12	699	146	474	12.53	76.45%	1	60	13	46	13.00	77.97%
2000	Philadelphia	10	580	130	419	13.44	76.32%	1	60	14	29	14.00	67.44%
2001	Philadelphia	14	747	149	504	11.96	77.18%	2	119	19	75	9.54	79.79%
2002	Philadelphia	14	598	140	424	14.04	75.18%	1	59	12	45	12.20	78.95%
2003	Philadelphia	16	899	196	608	13.09	75.62%	--	--	--	--	--	--
2004	Philadelphia	16	726	140	439	11.57	75.82%	--	--	--	--	--	--
2005	Philadelphia	16	662	141	449	12.77	76.10%	--	--	--	--	--	--
2006	Portland	13	616	114	377	11.10	76.78%	1	58	13	31	13.39	70.45%
2007	Portland	16	718	146	452	12.20	75.59%	--	--	--	--	--	--
2008	Portland	16	255	53	155	12.45	74.52%	3	48	9	38	11.37	80.85%
NLL totals		213	9,714	1,981	6,356	12.24	76.24%	24	1,224	239	774	11.71	76.41%

== Awards ==
Preceded by Steve Dietrich	Champion's Cup MVP; 1998	Succeeded by Colin Doyle
Preceded by Dan Stroup	Champion's Cup MVP; 2001	Succeeded by Colin Doyle
