= 2000 Philadelphia Wings season =

2000 Philadelphia Wings
- League: NLL
- Rank: 4th
- 2000 record: 7–5
- Home record: 4–2
- Road record: 3–3
- Goals for: 172
- Goals against: 165
- Coach: Tony Resch
- Arena: Wachovia Center

The 2000 Philadelphia Wings season marked the team's fourteenth season of operation.

== Regular season ==
=== Conference standings ===
P	Team	GP	W	L	PCT	GB	Home	Road	GF	GA	Diff	GF/GP	GA/GP
1	Toronto Rock – xyz	12	9	3	.750	0.0	5–1	4–2	162	130	+32	13.50	10.83
2	Buffalo Bandits – x	12	8	4	.667	1.0	5–1	3–3	202	194	+8	16.83	16.17
3	Rochester Knighthawks – x	12	8	4	.667	1.0	5–1	3–3	187	149	+38	15.58	12.42
4	Philadelphia Wings – x	12	7	5	.583	2.0	4–2	3–3	172	165	+7	14.33	13.75
5	Albany Attack	12	6	6	.500	3.0	4–2	2–4	169	160	+9	14.08	13.33
6	Pittsburgh CrosseFire	12	6	6	.500	3.0	4–2	2–4	184	164	+20	15.33	13.67
7	New York Saints	12	3	9	.250	6.0	2–4	1–5	152	194	−42	12.67	16.17
8	Syracuse Smash	12	1	11	.083	8.0	1–5	0–6	135	207	−72	11.25	17.25

x: Clinched playoff berth; c: Clinched playoff berth by crossing over to another division; y: Clinched division; z: Clinched best regular season record; GP: Games Played
W: Wins; L: Losses; GB: Games back; PCT: Win percentage; Home: Record at Home; Road: Record on the Road; GF: Goals scored; GA: Goals allowed
Differential: Difference between goals scored and allowed; GF/GP: Average number of goals scored per game; GA/GP: Average number of goals allowed per game

=== Game log ===
Game	Date	Opponent	Location	Score	OT	Attendance	Record
1	January 7, 2000	Albany Attack	Wachovia Center	W 12–11	OT	11,201	1–0
2	January 22, 2000	@ Pittsburgh CrosseFire	Mellon Arena	L 15–16		4,521	1–1
3	January 29, 2000	Rochester Knighthawks	Wachovia Center	W 15–12		15,550	2–1
4	February 5, 2000	New York Saints	Wachovia Center	W 15–13		16,750	3–1
5	February 11, 2000	@ New York Saints	NassauColiseum	W 17–11		5,618	4–1
6	February 26, 2000	Pittsburgh CrosseFire	Wachovia Center	L 8–14		18,911	4–2
7	March 18, 2000	@ Syracuse Smash	Onondaga County War Memorial	W 17–14		2,421	5–2
8	March 25, 2000	Toronto Rock	Wachovia Center	L 13–15		16,544	5–3
9	April 1, 2000	@ Buffalo Bandits	Marine Midland Arena	L 11–16		10,396	5–4
10	April 2, 2000	@ Albany Attack	Pepsi Arena	W 13–12	OT	5,933	6–4
11	April 8, 2000	Buffalo Bandits	Wachovia Center	W 22–11		16,187	7–4
12	April 15, 2000	@ Rochester Knighthawks	Blue Cross Arena	L 14–20		10,627	7–5

== Playoffs ==
=== Game log ===
Game	Date	Opponent	Location	Score	OT	Attendance	Record
Semifinal	April 22, 2000	@ Toronto Rock	Maple Leaf Gardens	L 10–14		10,561	0–1

== Roster ==
No.		Position	Player
66	(United States)	Fwd	Bergey, Jake
41	(United States)	Fwd	Busza, Michael
13	(Canada)	Fwd	Clark, Jason
35	(Canada)	Goalie	Eliuk, Dallas
11	(United States)	Fwd	Finneran, Kevin
88	(United States)	Fwd	Hanford, Jamie
24	(United States)	Fwd	Jacobs, Peter
42	(Canada)	Fwd	Marechek, Tom
12	(United States)	Fwd	McEvoy, John
9	(United States)	Fwd	Millon, Mark
18	(United States)	Fwd	Ogelsby, Matt

No.		Position	Player
7	(United States)	Fwd	O'Grady, Paul
51	(United States)	Fwd	Panos, Chris
4	(Canada)	Fwd	Phair, Tom
1	(United States)	Goalie	Piazza, Andy
55	(United States)	Fwd	Radebaugh, Dan
84	(United States)	Fwd	Radebaugh, Sean
14	(United States)	Fwd	Rogers, Jim
17	(United States)	Fwd	Ryan, Tom
43	(United States)	Fwd	Slate, Tom
77	(United States)	Fwd	Stilley, David
91	(United States)	Fwd	Traynor, Greg

== See also ==
- Philadelphia Wings
- 2000 NLL season
