= 1999 Philadelphia Wings season =

1999 Philadelphia Wings
- League: NLL
- Rank: 4th
- 1999 record: 5–7
- Home record: 4–2
- Road record: 1–5
- Goals for: 153
- Goals against: 153
- Coach: Tony Resch
- Arena: Wachovia Center

The 1999 Philadelphia Wings season marked the team's thirteenth season of operation.

== Regular season ==
=== Conference standings ===
P	Team	GP	W	L	PCT	GB	Home	Road	GF	GA	Diff	GF/GP	GA/GP
1	Toronto Rock – xyz	12	9	3	.750	0.0	6–0	3–3	157	139	+18	13.08	11.58
2	Baltimore Thunder – x	12	8	4	.667	1.0	5–1	3–3	211	175	+36	17.58	14.58
3	Rochester Knighthawks – x	12	8	4	.667	1.0	4–2	4–2	169	160	+9	14.08	13.33
4	Philadelphia Wings – x	12	5	7	.417	4.0	4–2	1–5	153	153	−-0	12.75	12.75
5	New York Saints	12	5	7	.417	4.0	2–4	3–3	149	156	−7	12.42	13.00
6	Buffalo Bandits	12	4	8	.333	5.0	1–5	3–3	158	177	−19	13.17	14.75
7	Syracuse Smash	12	3	9	.250	6.0	3–3	0–6	161	198	−37	13.42	16.50

x: Clinched playoff berth; c: Clinched playoff berth by crossing over to another division; y: Clinched division; z: Clinched best regular season record; GP: Games Played
W: Wins; L: Losses; GB: Games back; PCT: Win percentage; Home: Record at Home; Road: Record on the Road; GF: Goals scored; GA: Goals allowed
Differential: Difference between goals scored and allowed; GF/GP: Average number of goals scored per game; GA/GP: Average number of goals allowed per game

=== Game log ===
Game	Date	Opponent	Location	Score	OT	Attendance	Record
1	January 8, 1999	Buffalo Bandits	Wachovia Center	L 17–18	OT	14,348	0–1
2	January 9, 1999	@ Syracuse Smash	Onondaga County War Memorial	L 12–19		5,213	0–2
3	January 22, 1999	Rochester Knighthawks	Wachovia Center	L 12–15		15,183	0–3
4	January 30, 1999	@ Baltimore Thunder	Baltimore Arena	L 17–18	OT	10,125	0–4
5	February 5, 1999	@ Buffalo Bandits	Marine Midland Arena	W 13–11		9,205	1–4
6	February 19, 1999	@ Toronto Rock	Maple Leaf Gardens	L 7–9		10,166	1–5
7	February 27, 1999	Toronto Rock	Wachovia Center	W 12–11	OT	17,057	2–5
8	March 6, 1999	Syracuse Smash	Wachovia Center	W 15–6		15,678	3–5
9	March 13, 1999	Baltimore Thunder	Wachovia Center	W 16–13		16,398	4–5
10	March 26, 1999	@ New York Saints	Nassau Coliseum	L 13–14		6,513	4–6
11	April 3, 1999	New York Saints	Wachovia Center	W 10–9	OT	17,573	5–6
12	April 10, 1999	@ Rochester Knighthawks	Blue Cross Arena	L 9–10		9,236	5–7

== Playoffs ==
=== Game log ===
Game	Date	Opponent	Location	Score	OT	Attendance	Record
Semifinals	April 16, 1999	@ Toronto Rock	Maple Leaf Gardens	L 2–13		12,026	0–1

== Roster ==
No.		Position	Player
20	(United States)	Fwd	Bates, Chris
66	(United States)	Fwd	Bergey, Jake
41	(United States)	Fwd	Busza, Michael
35	(Canada)	Goalie	Eliuk, Dallas
16	(United States)	Fwd	Evans, Todd
11	(United States)	Fwd	Finneran, Kevin
9	(United States)	Fwd	Flynn, Chris
88	(United States)	Fwd	Hanford, Jamie
23	(United States)	Goalie	Hunter, Bill
19	(Canada)	Fwd	Jenner, Fred
22	(Canada)	Fwd	Katanchik, Todd

No.		Position	Player
42	(Canada)	Fwd	Marechek, Tom
12	(United States)	Fwd	McEvoy, John
21	(United States)	Fwd	Mueller, Adam
18	(United States)	Fwd	Ogelsby, Matt
55	(United States)	Fwd	Radebaugh, Dan
84	(United States)	Fwd	Radebaugh, Sean
14	(United States)	Fwd	Rogers, Jim
43	(United States)	Fwd	Slate, Tom
77	(United States)	Fwd	Stilley, David
91	(United States)	Fwd	Traynor, Greg

== See also ==
- Philadelphia Wings
- 1999 NLL season
