= 2001 Philadelphia Wings season =

2001 Philadelphia Wings
- Champion's Cup Champions
- League: NLL
- Rank: 2nd
- 2001 record: 10–4
- Home record: 6–1
- Road record: 4–3
- Goals for: 205
- Goals against: 177
- Coach: Tony Resch
- Captain: Dave Stilley
- Arena: Wachovia Center

The 2001 Philadelphia Wings season marked the team's fifteenth season of operation.

== Regular season ==
=== Conference standings ===
P	Team	GP	W	L	PCT	GB	Home	Road	GF	GA	Diff	GF/GP	GA/GP
1	Toronto Rock – xyz	14	11	3	.786	0.0	6–1	5–2	168	125	+43	12.00	8.93
2	Philadelphia Wings – x	14	10	4	.714	1.0	6–1	4–3	205	177	+28	14.64	12.64
3	Rochester Knighthawks – x	14	10	4	.714	1.0	6–1	4–3	198	159	+39	14.14	11.36
4	Washington Power – x	14	9	5	.643	2.0	4–3	5–2	226	204	+22	16.14	14.57
5	Buffalo Bandits	14	8	6	.571	3.0	4–3	4–3	248	218	+30	17.71	15.57
6	New York Saints	14	6	8	.429	5.0	3–4	3–4	179	181	−2	12.79	12.93
7	Albany Attack	14	5	9	.357	6.0	3–4	2–5	152	169	−17	10.86	12.07
8	Columbus Landsharks	14	3	11	.214	8.0	1–6	2–5	134	201	−67	9.57	14.36
9	Ottawa Rebel	14	1	13	.071	10.0	0–7	1–6	144	220	−76	10.29	15.71

x: Clinched playoff berth; c: Clinched playoff berth by crossing over to another division; y: Clinched division; z: Clinched best regular season record; GP: Games Played
W: Wins; L: Losses; GB: Games back; PCT: Win percentage; Home: Record at Home; Road: Record on the Road; GF: Goals scored; GA: Goals allowed
Differential: Difference between goals scored and allowed; GF/GP: Average number of goals scored per game; GA/GP: Average number of goals allowed per game

=== Game log ===
Game	Date	Opponent	Location	Score	OT	Attendance	Record
1	December 30, 2000	@ Rochester Knighthawks	Blue Cross Arena	W 17–16		9,870	1–0
2	January 12, 2001	Ottawa Rebel	Wachovia Center	W 17–8		14,386	2–0
3	January 20, 2001	@ Buffalo Bandits	HSBC Arena	L 18–26		8,261	2–1
4	January 27, 2001	Albany Attack	Wachovia Center	W 18–9		15,392	3–1
5	February 3, 2001	Rochester Knighthawks	Wachovia Center	W 14–12		15,186	4–1
6	February 9, 2001	@ Toronto Rock	Air Canada Centre	L 11–17		15,497	4–2
7	February 10, 2001	@ New York Saints	Nassau Veterans Memorial Coliseum	W 13–12		5,791	5–2
8	February 24, 2001	Buffalo Bandits	Wachovia Center	W 17–12		16,566	6–2
9	March 10, 2001	Toronto Rock	Wachovia Center	L 7–11		13,485	6–3
10	March 17, 2001	New York Saints	Wachovia Center	W 14–10		14,421	7–3
11	March 31, 2001	Washington Power	Wachovia Center	W 14–13		16,779	8–3
12	April 1, 2001	@ Washington Power	MCI Center	L 19–20		4,146	8–4
13	April 7, 2001	@ Columbus Landsharks	Nationwide Arena	W 17–7		6,023	9–4
14	April 14, 2001	@ Albany Attack	Pepsi Arena	W 9–4		3,906	10–4

== Playoffs ==
Tom Marechek on the 2001 Wings team said, “I’d say the last world championship when the Wings won in 2001 in Toronto. We shocked the whole league winning as underdogs, but we were confident. We had a bunch of scrappy American defenders and a handful of Canadians. We went into Toronto with an attitude. They won it in the two years before that and we did not play tough against them. That year, 2001, we put it together and we got it at the right time. That was definitely the highlight in my 12-year career as a Wing.”

=== Game log ===
Game	Date	Opponent	Location	Score	OT	Attendance	Record
Semifinals	April 20, 2001	Rochester Knighthawks	Wachovia Center	W 12–11		10,259	1–0
Championship Game	April 27, 2001	@ Toronto Rock	Air Canada Centre	W 9–8		19,409	2–0

== Roster ==
No.		Position	Player
66	(United States)	Fwd	Bergey, Jake
PS	(United States)	Def	Brzeski, Richard
41	(United States)	Fwd	Busza, Michael
PS	(United States)	Def	Ceglia, Joe
13	(United States)	Fwd	Clark, Jason
98	(United States)	Fwd	D'Alonzo, Jesse
3	(United States)	Goalie	Dougherty, Brian
35	(Canada)	Goalie	Eliuk, Dallas
11	(United States)	Fwd	Finneran, Kevin
19	(United States)	Def	Gagliardi, John
5	(United States)	Def	Hanford, Jamie
24	(United States)	Def	Jacobs, Peter
56	(United States)	Fwd	Jalbert, Jay
10	(United States)	Def	Kaiser, Kevin

No.		Position	Player
42	(Canada)	Fwd	Marechek, Tom
9	(United States)	Fwd	Millon, Mark
51	(United States)	Fwd	Panos, Chris
4	(Canada)	Fwd	Phair, Tom
55	(United States)	Def	Radebaugh, Dan
90	(Canada)	Fwd	Ratcliffe, Jeff
17	(United States)	Fwd	Ryan, Tom
0	(Canada)	Goalie	Sanderson, Chris
PS	(United States)	Fwd	Schiller, Chris
37	(United States)	Def	Shirk, Jeff
#43	(United States)	Defense	Slate, Tom
77	(United States)	Def	Stilley, David
61	(United States)	Fwd	Traynor, Greg

== See also ==
- Philadelphia Wings
- 2001 NLL season
- Toronto Rock – Philadelphia Wings Finals Highlights
