= 2002 Philadelphia Wings season =

2002 Philadelphia Wings
- League: NLL
- Division: 2nd Eastern
- 2002 record: 8–8
- Home record: 6–2
- Road record: 2–6
- Goals for: 222
- Goals against: 237
- Coach: Adam Mueller
- Arena: Wachovia Center

The 2002 Philadelphia Wings season marked the team's sixteenth season of operation.

== Regular season ==
=== Conference standings ===
Central Division
P	Team	GP	W	L	PCT	GB	Home	Road	GF	GA	Diff	GF/GP	GA/GP
1	Albany Attack – xyz	16	14	2	.875	0.0	7–1	7–1	252	194	+58	15.75	12.12
2	Rochester Knighthawks – x	16	13	3	.812	1.0	8–0	5–3	261	202	+59	16.31	12.62
3	Montreal Express	16	8	8	.500	6.0	4–4	4–4	237	227	+10	14.81	14.19
4	Buffalo Bandits	16	8	8	.500	6.0	4–4	4–4	210	215	−5	13.12	13.44
5	Columbus Landsharks	16	5	11	.312	9.0	2–6	3–5	198	230	−32	12.38	14.38

East Division
P	Team	GP	W	L	PCT	GB	Home	Road	GF	GA	Diff	GF/GP	GA/GP
1	Washington Power – xy	16	9	7	.562	0.0	6–2	3–5	253	243	+10	15.81	15.19
2	Philadelphia Wings – x	16	8	8	.500	1.0	6–2	2–6	222	237	−15	13.88	14.81
3	New York Saints	16	5	11	.312	4.0	2–6	3–5	200	249	−49	12.50	15.56
4	New Jersey Storm	16	5	11	.312	4.0	3–5	2–6	178	232	−54	11.12	14.50

North Division
P	Team	GP	W	L	PCT	GB	Home	Road	GF	GA	Diff	GF/GP	GA/GP
1	Toronto Rock – xy	16	11	5	.688	0.0	8–0	3–5	223	176	+47	13.94	11.00
2	Vancouver Ravens – x	16	10	6	.625	1.0	6–2	4–4	236	192	+44	14.75	12.00
3	Calgary Roughnecks	16	4	12	.250	7.0	2–6	2–6	224	264	−40	14.00	16.50
4	Ottawa Rebel	16	4	12	.250	7.0	1–7	3–5	202	245	−43	12.62	15.31

x: Clinched playoff berth; c: Clinched playoff berth by crossing over to another division; y: Clinched division; z: Clinched best regular season record; GP: Games Played
W: Wins; L: Losses; GB: Games back; PCT: Win percentage; Home: Record at Home; Road: Record on the Road; GF: Goals scored; GA: Goals allowed
Differential: Difference between goals scored and allowed; GF/GP: Average number of goals scored per game; GA/GP: Average number of goals allowed per game

=== Game log ===
Game	Date	Opponent	Location	Score	OT	Attendance	Record
1	December 1, 2001	@ Albany Attack	Pepsi Arena	L 16–20		3,114	0–1
2	December 9, 2001	@ Vancouver Ravens	GM Place	W 18–14		8,324	1–1
3	December 15, 2001	@ Rochester Knighthawks	Blue Cross Arena	L 10–15		7,864	1–2
4	January 12, 2002	@ New York Saints	Nassau Veterans Memorial Coliseum	L 18–21		6,248	1–3
5	January 18, 2002	New York Saints	Wachovia Center	W 11–10		14,013	2–3
6	January 20, 2002	@ New Jersey Storm	Continental Airlines Arena	W 17–15		4,922	3–3
7	January 25, 2002	Buffalo Bandits	Wachovia Center	W 8–7		11,785	4–3
8	February 1, 2002	Rochester Knighthawks	Wachovia Center	W 21–13		10,236	5–3
9	February 16, 2002	New Jersey Storm	Wachovia Center	L 11–13		17,488	5–4
10	February 22, 2002	@ Buffalo Bandits	HSBC Arena	L 14–19		7,726	5–5
11	February 23, 2002	Columbus Landsharks	Wachovia Center	L 14–15	OT	13,726	5–6
12	March 2, 2002	Ottawa Rebel	Wachovia Center	W 19–17		14,016	6–6
13	March 9, 2002	@ Washington Power	Capital Centre	L 12–19		3,586	6–7
14	March 16, 2002	Washington Power	Wachovia Center	W 12–11		13,717	7–7
15	March 22, 2002	@ Toronto Rock	Air Canada Centre	L 9–17		17,501	7–8
16	March 23, 2002	Toronto Rock	Wachovia Center	W 12–11	OT	14,361	8–8

== Playoffs ==
=== Game log ===
Game	Date	Opponent	Location	Score	OT	Attendance	Record
Semifinals	March 30, 2012	Washington Power	Wachovia Center	L 11–12		10,041	0–1

== Roster ==
No.		Position	Player
66	(United States)	Fwd	Bergey, Jake
	(United States)	Def	Brzeski, Richard
	(United States)	Fwd	Burke, Zachery
13	(Canada)	Fwd	Clark, Jason
35	(Canada)	Goalie	Eliuk, Dallas
11	(United States)	Fwd	Finneran, Kevin
		Fwd	Janney, Peter
		Fwd	Klienmann, Randy
24	(United States)	Def	Jacobs, Peter
42	(Canada)	Fwd	Marechek, Tom
	(Canada)	Def	Martin, Andrew
4	(Canada)	Fwd	Phair, Tom

No.		Position	Player
90	(Canada)	Fwd	Ratcliffe, Jeff
17	(United States)	Fwd	Ryan, Tom
0	(Canada)	Goalie	Sanderson, Chris
	(United States)	Goalie	Schroeder, Nick
43	(United States)	Def	Slate, Tom
	(United States)	Def	Spano, Jeff
	(United States)	Fwd	Striebel, Matt
77	(United States)	Def	Stilley, David
61	(United States)	Fwd	Traynor, Greg
	(United States)	Fwd	Traynor, Ryan
		Fwd	Wasik, Andrew

== See also ==
- Philadelphia Wings
- 2002 NLL season
