= 1998 Philadelphia Wings season =

1998 Philadelphia Wings
- Champion's Cup Champions
- Division Champions
- League: NLL
- Rank: 1st
- 1998 record: 9–3
- Home record: 3–3
- Road record: 6–0
- Goals for: 166
- Goals against: 148
- Coach: Tony Resch
- Arena: Wachovia Center

The 1998 Philadelphia Wings season marked the team's twelfth season of operation.

== Regular season ==
=== Conference standings ===
P	Team	GP	W	L	PCT	GB	Home	Road	GF	GA	Diff	GF/GP	GA/GP
1	Philadelphia Wings – xyz	12	9	3	.750	0.0	3–3	6–0	166	148	+18	13.83	12.33
2	Baltimore Thunder – x	12	8	4	.667	1.0	4–2	4–2	184	160	+24	15.33	13.33
3	Rochester Knighthawks – x	12	6	6	.500	3.0	3–3	3–3	168	159	+9	14.00	13.25
4	Buffalo Bandits – x	12	6	6	.500	3.0	4–2	2–4	166	171	−5	13.83	14.25
5	Ontario Raiders	12	6	6	.500	3.0	4–2	2–4	165	157	+8	13.75	13.08
6	New York Saints	12	5	7	.417	4.0	3–3	2–4	167	165	+2	13.92	13.75
7	Syracuse Smash	12	2	10	.167	7.0	2–4	0–6	163	219	−56	13.58	18.25

x: Clinched playoff berth; c: Clinched playoff berth by crossing over to another division; y: Clinched division; z: Clinched best regular season record; GP: Games Played
W: Wins; L: Losses; GB: Games back; PCT: Win percentage; Home: Record at Home; Road: Record on the Road; GF: Goals scored; GA: Goals allowed
Differential: Difference between goals scored and allowed; GF/GP: Average number of goals scored per game; GA/GP: Average number of goals allowed per game

=== Game log ===
Game	Date	Opponent	Location	Score	OT	Attendance	Record
1	January 3, 1998	@ Buffalo Bandits	HSBC Arena	W 14–12		11,402	1–0
2	January 9, 1998	@ New York Saints	Nassau Coliseum	W 15–8		6,032	2–0
3	January 16, 1998	Baltimore Thunder	Wachovia Center	L 9–12		12,289	2–1
4	January 24, 1998	@ Syracuse Smash	Onondaga County War Memorial	W 17–15		3,755	3–1
5	January 31, 1998	@ Baltimore Thunder	Baltimore Arena	W 15–9		5,818	4–1
6	February 7, 1998	Buffalo Bandits	Wachovia Center	W 15–9		15,065	5–1
7	February 13, 1998	Syracuse Smash	Wachovia Center	W 14–11		13,213	6–1
8	February 28, 1998	@ Ontario Raiders	Copps Coliseum	W 12–11	OT	3,446	7–1
9	March 21, 1998	New York Saints	Wachovia Center	L 14–15		17,077	7–2
10	March 28, 1998	Rochester Knighthawks	Wachovia Center	W 13–12	OT	14,043	8–2
11	April 4, 1998	@ Rochester Knighthawks	Blue Cross Arena	W 20–19	OT	6,480	9–2
12	April 11, 1998	Ontario Raiders	Wachovia Center	L 8–15		13,495	9–3

== Playoffs ==
=== Game log ===
Game	Date	Opponent	Location	Score	OT	Attendance	Record
Semifinals	April 18, 1998	Buffalo Bandits	Wachovia Center	W 17–12		9,795	1–0
Championship Game 1 of 3	April 26, 1998	Baltimore Thunder	Wachovia Center	W 16–12		9,860	2–0
Championship Game 2 of 3	April 28, 1998	@ Baltimore Thunder	Baltimore Arena	W 17–12		3,137	3–0

== Roster ==
No.		Position	Player
20	(United States)	Fwd	Bates, Chris
66	(United States)	Fwd	Bergey, Jake
41	(United States)	Fwd	Busza, Michael
3	(United States)	Fwd	Deniken, Paul
35	(Canada)	Goalie	Eliuk, Dallas
11	(United States)	Fwd	Finneran, Kevin
9	(United States)	Fwd	Flynn, Chris
8	(United States)	Fwd	Gabrielsen, Scott
44	(Canada)	Fwd	Govett, Steve
23	(United States)	Goalie	Hunter, Bill
24	(United States)	Fwd	Jacobs, Peter
42	(Canada)	Fwd	Marechek, Tom

No.		Position	Player
2	(United States)	Fwd	McEvoy, John
99	(United States)	Fwd	Miller, Bill
21	(United States)	Fwd	Mueller, Adam
88	(United States)	Fwd	Ogelsby, Matt
7	(United States)	Fwd	O'Grady, Paul
1	(United States)	Goalie	Piazza, Andy
13	(United States)	Fwd	Roe, Gabby
14	(United States)	Fwd	Rogers, Jim
43	(United States)	Fwd	Slate, Tom
91	(United States)	Fwd	Traynor, Greg
29	(United States)	Fwd	Traynor, Ryan (Randolph-Macon)
6	(United States)	Fwd	Voelker, Bryan

== See also ==
- Philadelphia Wings
- 1998 NLL season
