= Pittsburgh CrosseFire =

American box lacrosse team

- Sport: Box lacrosse
- First season: 2000
- League: National Lacrosse League
- Team history: Baltimore Thunder (1987–1999)
- Based in: Pittsburgh, Pennsylvania
- Arena: Pittsburgh Civic Arena
- Colors: Red, Yellow, Black
- Formerly: Baltimore Thunder
- Later: Washington Power (2001–2002); Colorado Mammoth (2003–Present)

The Pittsburgh CrosseFire was an American professional box lacrosse team and a member of the National Lacrosse League during the 2000 NLL season. It was based in Pittsburgh, Pennsylvania.

== History ==
=== Relocation from Baltimore ===
The franchise started out as the Baltimore Thunder in 1987. Following the 1999 season, team owner Dennis Townsend expressed disappoint in Baltimore's lack of support for the team, despite the team featuring five-time MVP Gary Gait and reigning Rookie of the Year Jesse Hubbard. After reportedly losing $2 million during his two-year ownership, Townsend moved the team to Pittsburgh in July 1999.

=== 2000 season ===
Despite retaining the core of the Thunder team that had reached the postseason in the previous two seasons, the CrosseFire struggled early in the season. After a 2-3 start, the CrossFire acquired Gait's twin brother Paul in a mid-season trade from the Syracuse Smash. The team finished the season with a 6-6 record, losing their final game in double overtime to the winless Smash to finish one game out of a playoff spot.

Gary Gait finished with 83 points, tied with John Tavares for most in the league and was named First Team All-Pro, but missed out on winning his sixth straight MVP Award. Paul Gait would earn 2nd Team All-Pro honors.

The Pittsburgh CrosseFire average 4,916 fans per game during the 2000 season, the second-lowest in the league and significantly less than the 7,057 averaged by the Thunder in their final season in Baltimore.

=== Sale and relocation ===
In April 2000, one month after the team's inaugural season, Dennis Townsend closed the team's Pittsburgh offices and announced the team was for sale. The CrossFire would be sold to DC-based attorney Steve Comiskey, who relocated the team to Washington, becoming the Washington Power.

== All time Record ==
Season	W-L	Finish	Home	Road	GF	GA	Coach	Playoffs
2000	6–6	6th	4–2	2–4	184	164	John Tucker	Missed playoffs
Total	6–6		4–2	2–4	184	164		

Game	Date	Opponent	Location	Score	OT	Attendance	Record
1	January 8, 2000	@ New York Saints		W 23–12			1–0
2	January 14, 2000	@ Albany Attack		L 19–21			1–1
3	January 15, 2000	@ Rochester Knighthawks		L 14–18			1–2
4	January 22, 2000	Philadelphia Wings	Mellon Arena	W 16–15		4,521	2–2
5	January 28, 2000	Toronto Rock	Mellon Arena	L 9–11		3,217	2–3
6	February 12, 2000	Buffalo Bandits	Mellon Arena	W 17–14		5,218	3–3
7	February 25, 2000	New York Saints	Mellon Arena	W 20–15		5,074	4–3
8	February 26, 2000	@ Philadelphia Wings		W 14–8			5–3
9	March 10, 2000	Rochester Knighthawks	Mellon Arena	L 12–17		5,325	5–4
10	March 25, 2000	Syracuse Smash	Mellon Arena	W 21–9		6,140	6–4
11	March 31, 2000	@ Toronto Rock		L 10–14			6–5
12	April 8, 2000	@ Syracuse Smash		L 9–10	2OT		6–6
