= 2000 NLL season =

- League: National Lacrosse League
- Sport: Indoor lacrosse
- Duration: January 7, 2000 – May 6, 2000
- Games: 12
- Teams: 8

Regular season
- League champions: Toronto Rock
- Runners-up: Buffalo Bandits
- Season MVP: John Tavares (Buffalo Bandits)
- Top scorer: John Tavares (Buffalo Bandits); Gary Gait (Pittsburgh CrosseFire)

Champion's Cup
- Champions: Toronto Rock (2nd title)
- Runners-up: Rochester Knighthawks
- Finals MVP: Dan Stroup (Toronto)

NLL seasons
- ← 1999 season 2001 season →

The 2000 National Lacrosse League season is the 14th season in the NLL that began on January 7, 2000, and concluded with the championship game on May 6, 2000. The Toronto Rock defeated the Rochester Knighthawks 14–13. Kaleb Toth scored the winning goal with less than two seconds left in regulation to give the Rock their second straight championship.

== Team movement ==
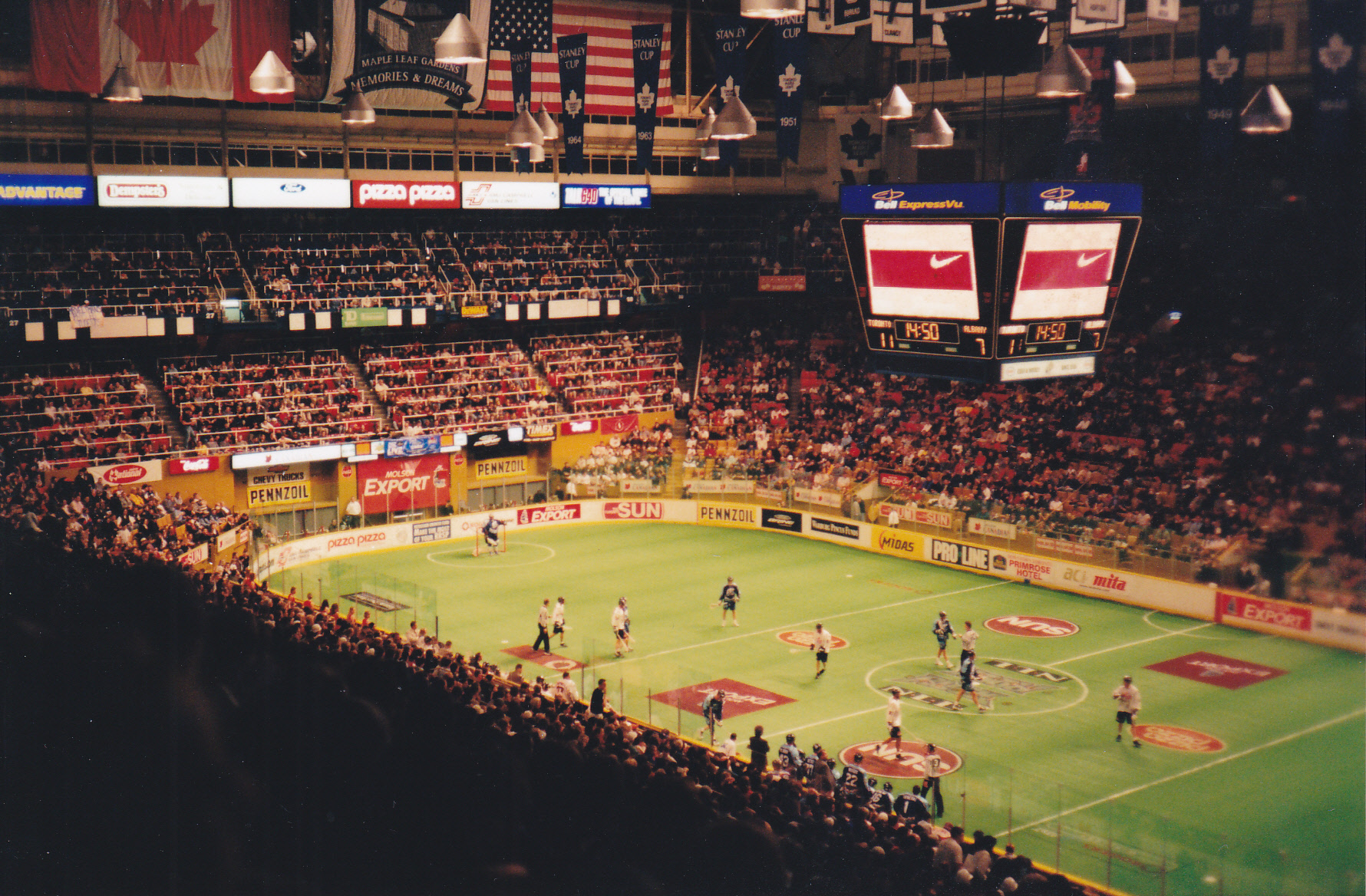
The Toronto Rock vs Albany Attack on 8 April 2000

One expansion team was added to the NLL for the 2000 season, the Albany Attack. In addition, the Baltimore Thunder left Baltimore and became the Pittsburgh CrosseFire, though the franchise would only last a single season in Pittsburgh before moving to Washington.

=== Teams ===
2000 National Lacrosse League
Team	City	Arena	Capacity
Albany Attack	Albany, New York	Pepsi Arena	14,236
Buffalo Bandits	Buffalo, New York	Marine Midland Arena	18,595
New York Saints	Uniondale, New York	Nassau Veterans Memorial Coliseum	16,297
Philadelphia Wings	Philadelphia, Pennsylvania	First Union Center	19,519
Pittsburgh CrosseFire	Pittsburgh, Pennsylvania	Civic Arena	16,958
Rochester Knighthawks	Rochester, New York	Blue Cross Arena	10,662
Syracuse Smash	Syracuse, New York	Oncenter War Memorial Arena	5,800
Toronto Rock	Toronto, Ontario	Maple Leaf Gardens	15,726

=== Map of teams ===
National Lacrosse League Teams

== Regular season ==
P	Team	GP	W	L	PCT	GB	Home	Road	GF	GA	Diff	GF/GP	GA/GP
1	Toronto Rock – xyz	12	9	3	.750	0.0	5–1	4–2	162	130	+32	13.50	10.83
2	Buffalo Bandits – x	12	8	4	.667	1.0	5–1	3–3	202	194	+8	16.83	16.17
3	Rochester Knighthawks – x	12	8	4	.667	1.0	5–1	3–3	187	149	+38	15.58	12.42
4	Philadelphia Wings – x	12	7	5	.583	2.0	4–2	3–3	172	165	+7	14.33	13.75
5	Albany Attack	12	6	6	.500	3.0	4–2	2–4	169	160	+9	14.08	13.33
6	Pittsburgh CrosseFire	12	6	6	.500	3.0	4–2	2–4	184	164	+20	15.33	13.67
7	New York Saints	12	3	9	.250	6.0	2–4	1–5	152	194	−42	12.67	16.17
8	Syracuse Smash	12	1	11	.083	8.0	1–5	0–6	135	207	−72	11.25	17.25

x: Clinched playoff berth; c: Clinched playoff berth by crossing over to another division; y: Clinched division; z: Clinched best regular season record; GP: Games Played
W: Wins; L: Losses; GB: Games back; PCT: Win percentage; Home: Record at Home; Road: Record on the Road; GF: Goals scored; GA: Goals allowed
Differential: Difference between goals scored and allowed; GF/GP: Average number of goals scored per game; GA/GP: Average number of goals allowed per game

== All Star Game ==
No All-Star game was held in 2000.

== Playoffs ==
Semifinals
3	Rochester	15
2	Buffalo	11
4	Philadelphia	10
1	Toronto	14

Championship
3	Rochester	13
1	Toronto	14

== Awards ==
Award	Winner	Team
MVP Award	John Tavares	Buffalo
Rookie of the Year Award	John Grant Jr.	Rochester
Championship Game MVP	Dan Stroup	Toronto

=== Weekly awards ===
Each week, a player is awarded "Player of the Week" honours.

Week	Player of the Week
1	Kim Squire
2	Josh Sanderson
3	Kip Fulks
4	Tom Marechek
5	Pat O'Toole
6	Roy Colsey
7	Matt Disher
8	Paul Gait
9	Kaleb Toth
10	Rob Blasdell
11	John Grant Jr.
12	Colin Doyle
13	John Grant, Jr.
14	Mark Millon
15	Mark Shepherd

=== Monthly awards ===
Awards are also given out monthly for the best overall player and best rookie.

Month	Overall	Rookie
Jan	Ted Dowling	John Grant, Jr.
Feb	John Tavares	Devin Dalep
Mar	Rob Blasdell	John Grant, Jr.

== Statistics leaders ==
Bold numbers indicate new single-season records. Italics indicate tied single-season records.

Stat	Player	Team	Number
**Goals**	Ted Dowling	Albany	41
	Tom Marechek	Philadelphia	41
**Assists**	John Tavares	Buffalo	**49**
**Points**	Gary Gait	Baltimore	83
	John Tavares	Buffalo	83
**Loose balls**	Jim Veltman	Toronto	167
**Save pct**	Bob Watson	Toronto	77.2

== Attendance ==
=== Regular season ===
Home team	Home games	Average attendance	Total attendance
Philadelphia Wings	6	15,857	95,143
Toronto Rock	6	13,881	83,287
Rochester Knighthawks	6	8,910	53,458
Buffalo Bandits	6	8,186	49,116
Albany Attack	6	5,749	34,492
New York Saints	6	5,674	34,046
Pittsburgh CrosseFire	6	4,916	29,495
Syracuse Smash	6	2,660	15,957
**League**	**48**	**8,229**	**394,994**

=== Playoffs ===
Home team	Home games	Average attendance	Total attendance
Toronto Rock	2	12,386	24,772
Buffalo Bandits	1	7,873	7,873
**League**	**3**	**10,882**	**32,645**

== See also ==
- 2000 in sports
