= Jake Bergey =

American lacrosse player (born 1974)

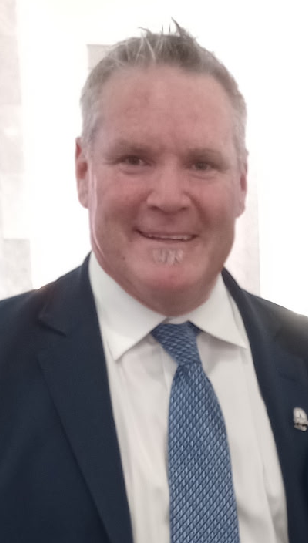
- Bergey in 2025

Personal information
- Born: May 4, 1974 (age 52) Covington, Kentucky, U.S.
- Height: 6 ft 0 in (183 cm)
- Weight: 215 lb (98 kg; 15 st 5 lb)

Sport
- Position: Forward
- NLL draft: 38th overall, 1997; Philadelphia Wings
- NLL teams: Philadelphia Wings
- MLL teams: Rochester Rattlers; Baltimore Bayhawks
- NCAA team: Salisbury Sea Gulls
- Pro career: 1998–2008

Jake Bergey (born May 4, 1974) is an American former lacrosse player. He played 10 seasons for the Philadelphia Wings of the National Lacrosse League (NLL) and also played three seasons in Major League Lacrosse (MLL).

The son of National Football League player Bill Bergey, Bergey was born in Kentucky and grew up in the Philadelphia area. He grew up playing several sports and was a standout football and lacrosse player at the Tatnall School in Delaware. After high school, he played lacrosse in college for the Salisbury Sea Gulls, being a three-time first-team All-American while helping the team win two national championships.

Following his graduation from college, Bergey joined the Philadelphia Wings of the NLL in 1998, having been selected in the league's 1997 draft. He became a fan favorite and played 10 seasons for the Wings, contributing to their 1998 and 2001 Champion's Cup victories while scoring 256 goals and 301 assists for a total of 557 points, each placing second in franchise history. He also played three seasons in Major League Lacrosse (MLL) with the Rochester Rattlers and Baltimore Bayhawks.

== Early life ==
Bergey was born on May 4, 1974, in Covington, Kentucky. He has two brothers, Josh and Jason, who also competed in sports. The son of National Football League player Bill Bergey, he moved to the Philadelphia area as a child when his father was traded to the Philadelphia Eagles. He grew up in Chadds Ford, Pennsylvania. He attended Upland Country Day School in Kennett Square, Pennsylvania, from third grade to eighth grade, where he began playing lacrosse and also competed in soccer and ice hockey.

Bergey later attended the Tatnall School in Wilmington, Delaware, where he competed in football and lacrosse; he was coached by his father in football at Tatnall. In football, he played as a defensive back, running back and slotback, being a starter both ways in three seasons on the varsity team. He was honorable mention All-American and first-team all-state in football as a senior, when he led the team in tackles, interceptions, forced fumbles and fumble recoveries while placing third in the state in scoring. In lacrosse, he helped Tatnall to the state championship as a freshman in 1990 and later helped them to over 35 consecutive wins and a state championship in his senior year in 1993. He scored 89 goals in his senior year and was named an All-American. After Bergey graduated from Tatnall in 1993, he enrolled at Salisbury State University to play lacrosse.

== College career ==
Bergey played lacrosse for the Salisbury Sea Gulls from 1994 to 1997 and received varsity letters in all four years. Although he had been recruited to play the attack position, he was switched to midfield after joining the team. In his freshman year, he scored 23 goals and six assists while helping the Sea Gulls to an undefeated 16–0 season. Salisbury reached the NCAA Division III championship where they defeated Hobart by a score of 15–9, with Bergey scoring a team-leading five goals in the game. The following year, he recorded 50 goals and 25 assists while helping Salisbury to a 17–0 record and another national title, with Bergey scoring three goals in the championship game. He was named the NCAA Division III Midfielder of the Year for his performance during the 1995 season. He was also selected a first-team All-American.

Bergey became team captain and repeated as a first-team All-American in 1996, while Salisbury was upset in the NCAA tournament. He was the team leader with 57 goals and 18 assists on the season. He remained team captain as a senior in 1997, helping the Sea Gulls to the final four at the NCAA tournament while being the team leader with 39 goals and 19 assists. He was selected first-team All-American and the Capital Athletic Conference (CAC) Player of the Year. Overall, Salisbury compiled a record of 59–3 during Bergey's career. At the conclusion of his collegiate career, he competed at the North–South all-star game, where he was named MVP. Bergey graduated from Salisbury in December 1997 with a degree in biology. He was later inducted into the Salisbury Athletics Hall of Fame in 2007.

== Professional career ==
=== National Lacrosse League ===
In September 1997, Bergey was selected by the Philadelphia Wings in the National Lacrosse League (NLL) draft. The NLL is a box lacrosse (indoor lacrosse) league, while previously, Bergey had only played field lacrosse (outdoor lacrosse). After joining the Wings, he took the jersey number #66, the same his father had worn in the NFL, and quickly became a fan favorite. In his first season, 1998, he was third in the team in scoring with 20 goals and 18 assists in 12 games. He was the February 1998 Rookie of the Month and finished third in Rookie of the Year voting, while helping the Wings to the league title, the Champion's Cup. In the championship series, he scored one goal and four assists.

Bergey was named All-Pro in 1999 after scoring 31 goals and 39 assists, placing fourth in the league in scoring. He recorded 27 goals and 35 assists in 2000 and was again among the league leaders in scoring. He became assistant captain during the 2001 season and set a Wings record with 86 points, which came off 43 goals and 43 assists. He helped them win the Champion's Cup over the Toronto Rock. He scored 30 goals and 30 assists in 2002, but then missed the entirety of the 2003 season due to a torn ACL sustained in an exhibition game. He returned in 2004, but was limited by chronic plantar fasciitis; he scored 11 goals and 27 assists in 11 games. He scored 16 goals and 25 assists in 2005, then recorded 27 goals and 28 assists in 2006 and 22 goals and 25 assists in 2007. By the end of the 2007 season, he was second all-time in scoring for the Wings.

After playing 10 years for the Wings, Bergey was chosen by Boston Blazers coach and former teammate Tom Ryan in the 2007 National Lacrosse League expansion draft. After the draft, he was given a franchise tag by Boston to retain his rights for the 2008 season. Boston drafted Bergey even though he had off-season knee surgery and was considering retirement. Afterwards, Bergey said that he had no intention of playing outside Philadelphia, telling the Daily News that "I'm a Philly guy, through and through ... I totally expect to be back in Philadelphia. If things don't work out as planned, I have my hands filled enough with my family and my job that I can stay busy." During the 2007 entry draft, he was traded back to the Wings in exchange for two late-round draft picks. Bergey then played the 2008 season for Philadelphia, scoring 29 goals and 31 assists. He was second on the team in goals and assists and helped them achieve their first playoff berth in six years. He was selected by Boston again in the 2008 expansion draft, but did not play during the 2009 season. In February 2009, he was traded back to the Wings so he could retire as a member of them. He totaled 256 goals and 301 assists in his NLL career for a total of 557 points, with each of those being second in Wings history at the time of his retirement. The team later retired his number 66 in February 2014.

=== Major League Lacrosse ===
In 2000, Bergey helped promote the new Major League Lacrosse (MLL), a professional outdoor lacrosse league which played its seasons at a different time of the year than the NLL. He participated in the MLL's Summer Showcase tour that summer. He joined the Rochester Rattlers in the MLL for the 2001 season and was named a league all-star after scoring 15 goals and 10 assists. He returned to the Rattlers in 2002 and tallied seven goals and eight assists. During the 2003 Major League Lacrosse collegiate draft, he was traded from the Rattlers to the Baltimore Bayhawks. He began the 2003 season on injured reserve due to the torn ACL he suffered playing with the Wings. He debuted for the Bayhawks in the ninth game of the season, making one shot, and then was inactive the rest of the year. He did not play in the MLL after the 2003 season.

== Personal life ==
During his career, Bergey and Wings teammate Matt Oglesby co-owned a Mexican restaurant in West Chester, Pennsylvania. He married Heather Henry, who also played lacrosse, in December 2002. They have two children, including Bret and Taylor, who both play college lacrosse. After Bergey's career, he worked in medical sales. In 2025, he was inducted into the Delaware Sports Museum and Hall of Fame.

== Statistics ==
=== NLL ===
		Regular season						Playoffs
Season	Team	GP	G	A	Pts	LB	PIM	GP	G	A	Pts	LB	PIM
1998	Philadelphia	12	20	18	38	35	33	3	4	9	13	14	6
1999	Philadelphia	12	31	39	70	52	18	1	1	0	1	5	2
2000	Philadelphia	12	27	35	62	67	11	1	0	2	2	3	0
2001	Philadelphia	14	43	43	86	90	2	2	3	4	7	10	0
2002	Philadelphia	13	30	30	60	56	7	1	2	2	4	3	0
2004	Philadelphia	11	11	27	38	39	18	--	--	--	--	--	--
2005	Philadelphia	15	16	25	41	46	8	--	--	--	--	--	--
2006	Philadelphia	16	27	28	55	43	11	--	--	--	--	--	--
2007	Philadelphia	15	22	25	47	60	6	--	--	--	--	--	--
2008	Philadelphia	13	29	31	60	89	8	1	3	0	3	4	0
NLL totals		133	256	301	557	577	122	9	13	17	30	39	8

=== MLL ===
		Regular season							Playoffs
Season	Team	GP	G	2ptG	A	Pts	LB	PIM	GP	G	2ptG	A	Pts	LB	PIM
2001	Rochester	14	15	0	10	25	5	9	1	2	0	0	2	4	0
2002	Rochester	14	7	0	8	15	12	6	0	0	0	0	0	0	0
2003	Baltimore	1	0	0	0	0	1	0	0	0	0	0	0	0	0
MLL totals		22	22	0	18	40	18	15	1	2	0	0	2	4	0

=== College ===
Season	GP	G	A	Pts	PPG
1994	--	--	--	--	--
1995	--	--	--	--	--
1996	--	57	18	75	--
1997	--	39	19	58	--
Totals	--	--	--	--	--
