= 2002 NLL season =

- League: National Lacrosse League
- Sport: Indoor lacrosse
- Duration: November 16, 2001 – April 13, 2002
- Games: 16
- Teams: 13
- TV partner(s): CNN Sports Illustrated (United States); Rogers Sportsnet (Canada)

Regular season
- Season MVP: Paul Gait (Washington Power)
- Top scorer: Paul Gait (Washington Power)

Playoffs
- Eastern champions: Washington Power
- Eastern runners-up: Philadelphia Wings
- Central champions: Albany Attack
- Central runners-up: Rochester Knighthawks
- Northern champions: Toronto Rock
- Northern runners-up: Vancouver Ravens

Champion's Cup
- Champions: Toronto Rock (3rd title)
- Runners-up: Albany Attack
- Finals MVP: Colin Doyle (Toronto)

NLL seasons
- ← 2001 season 2003 season →

The 2002 National Lacrosse League season is the 16th season in the NLL. The season began on November 16, 2001 and concluded with the championship game on April 13, 2002, so, during that season, it was known as the 2001-2002 season as can be seen in the Albany Attack's 2001-2002 Central Division Championship banner.

The Toronto Rock defeated the Albany Attack 13–12 to win their third championship in four seasons. Colin Doyle was named championship game MVP for the second time.

Only one year after the season was lengthened to 14 games, 2002 saw it extended again, this time to 16 games.

== Team movement ==
2002 was a year of expansion for the NLL, particularly north of the border. The league added four teams, three of which were Canadian: the New Jersey Storm, Montreal Express, Vancouver Ravens, and Calgary Roughnecks all made their NLL debuts. The expansion caused the NLL to return to a divisional format for the first time since 1994. The teams were split into the Eastern, Central, and Northern divisions; the winners of each division would make the playoffs, as well as the top three ranked non-division-winners. The Eastern division consisted of Washington, Philadelphia, New York, and New Jersey, the Central division had Albany, Rochester, Montreal, Buffalo, and Columbus, while the remaining Canadian teams (Toronto, Ottawa, Vancouver, and Calgary) were in the Northern division.

Early in the morning of February 14, limousine driver Costas Christofi was found shot to death at the home of New Jersey Storm owner Jayson Williams. Williams was later arrested and charged with manslaughter. Williams was acquitted of most charges, but was to be retried for reckless manslaughter. However, the case was delayed several times. On Monday, January 11, 2010, Williams pleaded guilty to aggravated assault in the case, and was sentenced on February 23, 2010. Williams would remain owner of the Storm until the franchise folded after the 2005 season.

For the first time in league history, a team changed arenas midseason, as the Ottawa Rebel left the Corel Centre for the smaller Ottawa Civic Centre. There were two home games left in the season at the time of the move.

=== Teams ===
2002 National Lacrosse League
Division	Team	City	Arena	Capacity
Central	Albany Attack	Albany, New York	Pepsi Arena	14,236
Central	Buffalo Bandits	Buffalo, New York	HSBC Arena	18,690
Central	Columbus Landsharks	Columbus, Ohio	Nationwide Arena	18,136
Central	Montreal Express	Montreal, Quebec	Molson Centre	21,273
Central	Rochester Knighthawks	Rochester, New York	Blue Cross Arena	10,662
East	New Jersey Storm	East Rutherford, New Jersey	Izod Center	19,040
East	New York Saints	Uniondale, New York	Nassau Veterans Memorial Coliseum	16,234
East	Philadelphia Wings	Philadelphia, Pennsylvania	First Union Center	19,519
East	Washington Power	Landover, Maryland	Capital Centre	18,130
North	Calgary Roughnecks	Calgary, Alberta	Pengrowth Saddledome	19,289
North	Ottawa Rebel	Ottawa, Ontario	Corel Centre; Ottawa Civic Centre	18,500; 10,550
North	Toronto Rock	Toronto, Ontario	Air Canada Centre	18,800
North	Vancouver Ravens	Vancouver, British Columbia	General Motors Place	18,514

=== Map of teams ===
Central Division East Division North Division

== Milestones ==
- November 23, 2001: The first ever game for both the Montreal Express and Calgary Roughnecks was a record-setting affair. Montreal set an NLL record for goals by one team in a game by defeating the Roughnecks 32–17 in Calgary. The records for most goals by in a game by both teams (49) and most penalty minutes in a game by both teams (155) were also broken in this game.
- January 4, 2002: Derek Malawsky of the Rochester Knighthawks sets a new NLL record with 11 assists in a 22–11 win over the Buffalo Bandits

== Final standings ==
=== Regular season ===
Central Division
P	Team	GP	W	L	PCT	GB	Home	Road	GF	GA	Diff	GF/GP	GA/GP
1	Albany Attack – xyz	16	14	2	.875	0.0	7–1	7–1	252	194	+58	15.75	12.12
2	Rochester Knighthawks – x	16	13	3	.812	1.0	8–0	5–3	261	202	+59	16.31	12.62
3	Montreal Express	16	8	8	.500	6.0	4–4	4–4	237	227	+10	14.81	14.19
4	Buffalo Bandits	16	8	8	.500	6.0	4–4	4–4	210	215	−5	13.12	13.44
5	Columbus Landsharks	16	5	11	.312	9.0	2–6	3–5	198	230	−32	12.38	14.38

East Division
P	Team	GP	W	L	PCT	GB	Home	Road	GF	GA	Diff	GF/GP	GA/GP
1	Washington Power – xy	16	9	7	.562	0.0	6–2	3–5	253	243	+10	15.81	15.19
2	Philadelphia Wings – x	16	8	8	.500	1.0	6–2	2–6	222	237	−15	13.88	14.81
3	New York Saints	16	5	11	.312	4.0	2–6	3–5	200	249	−49	12.50	15.56
4	New Jersey Storm	16	5	11	.312	4.0	3–5	2–6	178	232	−54	11.12	14.50

North Division
P	Team	GP	W	L	PCT	GB	Home	Road	GF	GA	Diff	GF/GP	GA/GP
1	Toronto Rock – xy	16	11	5	.688	0.0	8–0	3–5	223	176	+47	13.94	11.00
2	Vancouver Ravens – x	16	10	6	.625	1.0	6–2	4–4	236	192	+44	14.75	12.00
3	Calgary Roughnecks	16	4	12	.250	7.0	2–6	2–6	224	264	−40	14.00	16.50
4	Ottawa Rebel	16	4	12	.250	7.0	1–7	3–5	202	245	−43	12.62	15.31

x: Clinched playoff berth; c: Clinched playoff berth by crossing over to another division; y: Clinched division; z: Clinched best regular season record; GP: Games Played
W: Wins; L: Losses; GB: Games back; PCT: Win percentage; Home: Record at Home; Road: Record on the Road; GF: Goals scored; GA: Goals allowed
Differential: Difference between goals scored and allowed; GF/GP: Average number of goals scored per game; GA/GP: Average number of goals allowed per game

=== Playoffs ===
First Round
3	Washington	12
6	Philadelphia	11
5	Vancouver	10
4	Rochester	11

Semifinals
3	Washington	11
2	Toronto	12
4	Rochester	10
1	Albany	14

Championship
2	Toronto	13
1	Albany	12

- Washington was the higher seed but surrendered the location of the game to Philadelphia for financial reasons.

== All Star Game ==
The 2002 All-Star Game was held on April 21 at the Mohegan Sun Arena in Uncasville, Connecticut, where the North team (all of the Canadian teams plus Rochester) beat the South 14–10. The MVP was Toronto's Steve Toll, who scored three goals. At the time, this also marked Paul Gait's final professional lacrosse game, as he retired after this season. However, Gait was convinced by his brother Gary to come out of retirement during the 2005 season, and played four games for the Colorado Mammoth before retiring once again.

=== All-Star teams ===
North Team starters	South Team starters
John Grant, Jr., Rochester	Paul Gait, Washington
Colin Doyle, Toronto	Gary Gait, Washington
Chris Gill, Vancouver	Josh Sanderson, Albany
Pat Coyle, Toronto	Cam Woods, Albany
Jim Veltman, Toronto	Paul Cantabene, Philadelphia
Bob Watson, Toronto (goalie)	Rob Blasdell, Albany (goalie)
North Team Reserves	South Team Reserves
Tracey Kelusky, Montreal	Gary Rosyski, Albany
Ryan Painter, Ottawa	Roy Colsey, Buffalo
Peter Morgan, Vancouver	John Tavares, Buffalo
Steve Toll, Toronto	Gewas Schindler, Columbus
Kaleb Toth, Calgary	Gavin Prout, New York
Shawn Williams, Rochester	Kevin Finneran, Philadelphia
Derek Malawsky, Rochester	Tom Marechek, Philadelphia
Bruce Codd, Montreal	Jim Moss, Albany
Darren Reisig, Vancouver	Jamie Hanford, New Jersey
Mike Hasen, Rochester	Pat McCabe, New York
Dwight Maetche, Vancouver	Steve Dietrich, Buffalo (goalie)
Pat O'Toole, Rochester	Dallas Eliuk, Philadelphia (goalie)

== Awards ==
Award	Winner	Team
MVP Award	Paul Gait	Washington
Rookie of the Year Award	Blaine Manning	Toronto
Coach of the Year	Bob McMahon	Albany
GM of the Year Award	Dave Evans	Vancouver
Executive of the Year Award	Tom Mayenknecht	Vancouver
Defensive Player of the Year Award	Pat Coyle	Toronto
Goaltender of the Year Award	Rob Blasdell	Albany
Sportsmanship Award	Jim Veltman	Toronto
Championship Game MVP	Colin Doyle	Toronto

=== Weekly awards ===
In 2002, the NLL expanded its weekly player awards from one to four. There are now awards for the best overall player, best offensive player, best defensive player, and best rookie.

Week	Overall	Offensive	Defensive	Rookie
1	Matt Disher	Dan Stroup	Matt Disher	Blaine Manning
2	Tracey Kelusky	Tracey Kelusky	Bruce Codd	Blaine Manning
3	Tracey Kelusky	Paul Gait	Dwight Maetche	Peter Morgan
4	Tom Marechek	Roy Colsey	Dallas Eliuk	Gavin Prout
5	Gary Gait	Gary Gait	Steve Dietrich	Andrew Leyshon
6	Kyle Goundrey	Kyle Goundrey	Rob Blasdell	Peter Morgan
7	Shawn Williams	Kaleb Toth	Jesse Phillips	Billy LeFeuvre
8	Derek Malawsky	Derek Malawsky	Devin Dalep	Kasey Beirnes
9	Gewas Schindler	Gewas Schindler	Pat Coyle	Mike Miron
10	Peter Morgan	John Tavares	Devin Dalep	Peter Morgan
11	Paul Gait	Paul Gait	Bob Watson	Kasey Beirnes
12	Gary Gait	Jake Bergey	Bruce Codd	Blaine Manning
13	Chris Gill	Chris Gill	Rob Blasdell	Ryan Painter
14	Josh Sanderson	Shawn Williams	Matt Roik	Gavin Prout
15	John Tavares	John Tavares	Jesse Phillips	Mike Miron
16	Jeff Ratcliffe	Jeff Ratcliffe	Anthony Cosmo	Blaine Manning
17	Paul Gait	Paul Gait	Curtis Palidwor	Steve Penny
18	John Grant, Jr.	John Grant, Jr.	Chris Sanderson	Blaine Manning
19	Tom Marechek	John Tavares	Rob Blasdell	Ryan Painter

=== Monthly awards ===
Awards are also given out monthly for the best overall player and best rookie.

Month	Overall	Rookie
Nov/Dec	Tracy Kelusky	none selected
Jan	Paul Gait	Kasey Beirnes
Feb	Chris Gill	Gavin Prout
Mar	Paul Gait	Blaine Manning

== Statistics leaders ==
Bold numbers indicate new single-season records. Italics indicate tied single-season records.

Stat	Player	Team	Number
Goals	Paul Gait	Washington	54
Assists	Josh Sanderson	Albany	**68**
Points	Paul Gait	Washington	114
Penalty Minutes	Brian Reese	Washington	**78**
Loose Balls	Jim Veltman	Toronto	**203**
Save Pct	Rob Blasdell	Albany	77.5

== Attendance ==
=== Regular season ===
Home team	Home games	Average attendance	Total attendance
Toronto Rock	8	15,689	125,513
Philadelphia Wings	8	13,668	109,342
Vancouver Ravens	8	10,211	81,689
Rochester Knighthawks	8	8,945	71,559
Calgary Roughnecks	8	8,781	70,249
Montréal Express	8	7,969	63,755
Buffalo Bandits	8	7,448	59,582
Ottawa Rebel	8	5,937	47,498
New Jersey Storm	8	5,677	45,414
New York Saints	8	5,259	42,074
Columbus Landsharks	8	4,129	33,029
Albany Attack	8	3,508	28,066
Washington Power	8	3,330	26,638
**League**	**104**	**7,735**	**804,408**

=== Playoffs ===
Home team	Home games	Average attendance	Total attendance
Toronto Rock	1	14,442	14,442
Philadelphia Wings	1	10,041	10,041
Rochester Knighthawks	1	8,266	8,266
Albany Attack	2	7,182	14,363
**League**	**5**	**9,422**	**47,112**

== See also ==
- 2002 in sports
