= 2001 NLL season =

- League: National Lacrosse League
- Sport: Indoor lacrosse
- Duration: December 21, 2000 – April 27, 2001
- Games: 14
- Teams: 9
- TV partner: CNN Sports Illustrated

Draft
- Top draft pick: Gavin Prout
- Picked by: New York Saints

Regular season
- League champions: Toronto Rock
- Runners-up: Philadelphia Wings
- Season MVP: John Tavares (Buffalo Bandits)
- Top scorer: John Tavares (Buffalo Bandits)

Champion's Cup
- Champions: Philadelphia Wings (6th title)
- Runners-up: Toronto Rock
- Finals MVP: Dallas Eliuk (Wings)

NLL seasons
- ← 2000 season 2002 season →

The 2001 National Lacrosse League season is the 15th season in the NLL that began on December 21, 2000, and concluded with the championship game on April 27, 2001. The Philadelphia Wings won their 6th NLL championship, defeating the Toronto Rock 9–8 in Toronto. Philadelphia had now won twice as many championships as any other team in NLL history (the Buffalo Bandits had won three, and the Rock two). The Championship game was one of only two games (out of ten) the Rock lost at home during the 2001 season, and ended Toronto's bid for an unprecedented third straight Championship.

The NLL expanded its schedule from 12 games to 14 during this season.

The lowest-scoring game in NLL history happened during the 2001 season, as the Toronto Rock and Albany Attack combined for only 11 goals in a 7-4 Toronto win at the Air Canada Centre.

== Team movement ==
For the 2001 season, one expansion team was added to the NLL, the Columbus Landsharks. In addition, the Syracuse Smash ended a dismal existence (dead last in the standings for three straight years) in Syracuse, moving to Ottawa, Ontario to become the Rebel. Unfortunately, the Rebel would finish in the basement three straight years as well. The Pittsburgh CrosseFire, formerly the Baltimore Thunder, moved again, this time to Washington, becoming the Washington Power.

In addition, the Toronto Rock moved from the aging Maple Leaf Gardens to the Air Canada Centre for the 2001 season. The first Rock game at the ACC was a 17-7 Toronto win over the Ottawa Rebel on the opening night of the season, December 21, 2000.

=== Teams ===
2001 National Lacrosse League
Team	City	Arena	Capacity
Albany Attack	Albany, New York	Pepsi Arena	14,236
Buffalo Bandits	Buffalo, New York	HSBC Arena	18,690
Columbus Landsharks	Columbus, Ohio	Nationwide Arena	18,136
New York Saints	Uniondale, New York	Nassau Veterans Memorial Coliseum	16,297
Ottawa Rebel	Ottawa, Ontario	Corel Centre	18,500
Philadelphia Wings	Philadelphia, Pennsylvania	First Union Center	19,519
Rochester Knighthawks	Rochester, New York	Blue Cross Arena	10,662
Toronto Rock	Toronto, Ontario	Air Canada Centre	18,800
Washington Power	Washington, District of Columbia	MCI Center	18,277

=== Map of teams ===
National Lacrosse League Teams

== Regular season ==
P	Team	GP	W	L	PCT	GB	Home	Road	GF	GA	Diff	GF/GP	GA/GP
1	Toronto Rock – xyz	14	11	3	.786	0.0	6–1	5–2	168	125	+43	12.00	8.93
2	Philadelphia Wings – x	14	10	4	.714	1.0	6–1	4–3	205	177	+28	14.64	12.64
3	Rochester Knighthawks – x	14	10	4	.714	1.0	6–1	4–3	198	159	+39	14.14	11.36
4	Washington Power – x	14	9	5	.643	2.0	4–3	5–2	226	204	+22	16.14	14.57
5	Buffalo Bandits	14	8	6	.571	3.0	4–3	4–3	248	218	+30	17.71	15.57
6	New York Saints	14	6	8	.429	5.0	3–4	3–4	179	181	−2	12.79	12.93
7	Albany Attack	14	5	9	.357	6.0	3–4	2–5	152	169	−17	10.86	12.07
8	Columbus Landsharks	14	3	11	.214	8.0	1–6	2–5	134	201	−67	9.57	14.36
9	Ottawa Rebel	14	1	13	.071	10.0	0–7	1–6	144	220	−76	10.29	15.71

x: Clinched playoff berth; c: Clinched playoff berth by crossing over to another division; y: Clinched division; z: Clinched best regular season record; GP: Games Played
W: Wins; L: Losses; GB: Games back; PCT: Win percentage; Home: Record at Home; Road: Record on the Road; GF: Goals scored; GA: Goals allowed
Differential: Difference between goals scored and allowed; GF/GP: Average number of goals scored per game; GA/GP: Average number of goals allowed per game

== Statistics leaders ==
=== Scoring leaders ===
Note: GP = Games played; G = Goals; A = Assists; Pts = Points; PIM = Penalty minutes; LB = Loose Balls The following players lead the league in regular season points at the conclusion of games played on April 14, 2001.

Player	Team	GP	G	A	Pts	PIM	LB
John Tavares	Buffalo Bandits	14	51	64	115	14	159
Gary Gait	Washington Power	14	43	47	90	10	82
John Grant Jr.	Rochester Knighthawks	14	42	48	90	18	124
Jake Bergey	Philadelphia Wings	14	43	43	86	2	90
Tom Marechek	Philadelphia Wings	13	48	31	79	14	62
Shawn Williams	Buffalo Bandits	14	46	31	77	0	100
Roy Colsey	New York Saints	14	51	25	76	52	92
Derek Malawsky	Buffalo Bandits	12	23	47	70	12	81
Cory Bomberry	Rochester Knighthawks	14	24	42	66	14	69
Kevin Finneran	Philadelphia Wings	14	23	39	62	11	54

=== Leading goaltenders ===
Note: GP = Games played; Mins = Minutes played; W = Wins; L = Losses: GA = Goals Allowed; SV% = Save Percentage; GAA = Goals against average

The following goaltenders lead the league at the conclusion regular season on April 14, 2001.

Player	Team	GP	Mins	W	L	GA	SV%	GAA
Bob Watson	Toronto Rock	14	715	10	2	106	.796	8.90
Pat O'Toole	Rochester Knighthawks	13	555	8	2	98	.796	10.59
Dallas Eliuk	Philadelphia Wings	14	747	8	2	149	.771	11.97
Rob Blasdell	Albany Attack	13	745	5	8	151	.758	12.16
Gee Nash	New York Saints	14	807	6	6	168	.772	12.46

== All Star Game ==
No All-Star game was held in 2001.

== Playoffs ==
Semifinals
3	Rochester	11
2	Philadelphia	12
4	Washington	9
1	Toronto	10

Championship
2	Philadelphia	9
1	Toronto	8

== Awards ==
Award	Winner	Team
MVP Award	John Tavares	Buffalo
Rookie of the Year Award	Tracey Kelusky	Columbus
Coach of the Year	Tony Resch	Philadelphia
Executive of the Year Award	Russ Cline	Philadelphia
Goaltender of the Year Award	Bob Watson	Toronto
Championship Game MVP	Dallas Eliuk	Philadelphia

=== Weekly awards ===
Each week, a player is awarded "Player of the Week" honours.

Week	Player of the Week
1	no award given
2	John Grant Jr.
3	John Tavares
4	Roy Colsey
5	Derek Malawsky
6	Steve Toll
7	Jake Bergey
8	Devin Dalep
9	Pat O'Toole
10	Gee Nash
11	Tracey Kelusky
12	Kim Squire
13	Kevin Finneran
14	Pat O'Toole
15	Matt Shearer
16	Roy Colsey
17	Dallas Eliuk

=== Monthly awards ===
Awards are also given out monthly for the best overall player and best rookie.

Month	Overall	Rookie
Jan	Derek Malawsky	Tracey Kelusky
Feb	John Tavares	Kris Bryde
Mar	Gary Gait	Tracey Kelusky

== Attendance ==
=== Regular season ===
Home team	Home games	Average attendance	Total attendance
Toronto Rock	7	15,749	110,240
Philadelphia Wings	7	15,174	106,215
Rochester Knighthawks	7	9,147	64,032
Ottawa Rebel	7	8,058	56,409
Buffalo Bandits	7	8,041	56,289
Columbus Landsharks	7	6,559	45,912
New York Saints	7	5,918	41,426
Albany Attack	7	4,255	29,782
Washington Power	7	3,341	23,386
League	63	8,471	533,691

=== Playoffs ===
Home team	Home games	Average attendance	Total attendance
Toronto Rock	2	16,926	33,851
Philadelphia Wings	1	10,259	10,259
League	3	14,703	44,110

== See also ==
- 2001 in sports
