= Colin Doyle =

Colin Doyle may refer to:

- Colin Doyle (footballer) (born 1985), Irish footballer
- Colin Doyle (lacrosse) (born 1977), Canadian lacrosse player
