= 1998 NLL season =

- League: National Lacrosse League
- Sport: Indoor lacrosse
- Duration: January 3, 1998 - April 28, 1998
- Games: 12
- Teams: 7

Regular season
- League champions: Philadelphia Wings
- Runners-up: Baltimore Thunder
- Season MVP: Gary Gait (Baltimore Thunder)
- Top scorer: Gary Gait (Baltimore Thunder)

Champion's Cup
- Champions: Philadelphia Wings (5th title)
- Runners-up: Baltimore Thunder
- Finals MVP: Dallas Eliuk (Philadelphia)

MILL/NLL seasons
- ← 1997 season 1999 season →

Before the 1998 season, the Major Indoor Lacrosse League was renamed to be the National Lacrosse League, in the process increasing the length of the regular season from ten to twelve games. The first season as the NLL and the 12th season overall, began on January 3, 1998, and concluded with the second championship game on April 28. The championship was decided by a best-two-of-three series, with the Philadelphia Wings defeating the Baltimore Thunder 16–12 in the first game and 17–12 in the second.

== Team movement ==
The 1998 season featured the debut of two new teams, and the removal of one. The Boston Blazers folded after nine seasons in Boston and New England, while the Ontario Raiders and Syracuse Smash began play.

=== Teams ===
1998 National Lacrosse League
Team	City	Arena	Capacity
Baltimore Thunder	Baltimore, Maryland	Baltimore Arena	10,582
Buffalo Bandits	Buffalo, New York	Marine Midland Arena	18,595
New York Saints	Uniondale, New York	Nassau Veterans Memorial Coliseum	16,297
Ontario Raiders	Hamilton, Ontario	Copps Coliseum	17,383
Philadelphia Wings	Philadelphia, Pennsylvania	CoreStates Center	19,511
Rochester Knighthawks	Rochester, New York	Rochester Community War Memorial	10,662
Syracuse Smash	Syracuse, New York	Onondaga County War Memorial	5,800

=== Map of teams ===
National Lacrosse League Teams

== Regular season ==
P	Team	GP	W	L	PCT	GB	Home	Road	GF	GA	Diff	GF/GP	GA/GP
1	Philadelphia Wings – xyz	12	9	3	.750	0.0	3–3	6–0	166	148	+18	13.83	12.33
2	Baltimore Thunder – x	12	8	4	.667	1.0	4–2	4–2	184	160	+24	15.33	13.33
3	Rochester Knighthawks – x	12	6	6	.500	3.0	3–3	3–3	168	159	+9	14.00	13.25
4	Buffalo Bandits – x	12	6	6	.500	3.0	4–2	2–4	166	171	−5	13.83	14.25
5	Ontario Raiders	12	6	6	.500	3.0	4–2	2–4	165	157	+8	13.75	13.08
6	New York Saints	12	5	7	.417	4.0	3–3	2–4	167	165	+2	13.92	13.75
7	Syracuse Smash	12	2	10	.167	7.0	2–4	0–6	163	219	−56	13.58	18.25

x: Clinched playoff berth; c: Clinched playoff berth by crossing over to another division; y: Clinched division; z: Clinched best regular season record; GP: Games Played
W: Wins; L: Losses; GB: Games back; PCT: Win percentage; Home: Record at Home; Road: Record on the Road; GF: Goals scored; GA: Goals allowed
Differential: Difference between goals scored and allowed; GF/GP: Average number of goals scored per game; GA/GP: Average number of goals allowed per game

== All Star Game ==
No All-Star Game was played in 1998.

== Playoffs ==
Semifinals
4	Buffalo	12
1	Philadelphia	17
3	Rochester	14
2	Baltimore	15

Championship (best-of-3)
2	Baltimore	0
1	Philadelphia	2

- Game 1: Baltimore 12 @ Philadelphia 16
  Game 2: Philadelphia 17 @ Baltimore 12

== Awards ==
Award	Winner	Team
MVP Award	Gary Gait	Baltimore
Rookie of the Year Award	Colin Doyle	Ontario
Championship Game MVP (Series)	Dallas Eliuk	Philadelphia
Championship Game MVP (Game 1)	Dallas Eliuk	Philadelphia
Championship Game MVP (Game 2)	Bill Miller	Philadelphia

=== Weekly awards ===
Each week, a player is awarded "Player of the Week" honours.

Week	Player of the Week
1	Gary Gait
2	Andy Piazza
3	Derek Collins
4	Chris Gill
5	Eric Seremet
6	Tom Marechek
7	Gary Gait
8	Darris Kilgour
9	Derek General
10	Russ Heard
11	Colin Doyle
12	Steve Sombrotto
13	Mark Millon
14	John Tavares
15	Bob Watson

=== Monthly awards ===
Awards are also given out monthly for the best overall player and best rookie. The 1998 season was the first season that the Rookie of the Month award was given out.

Month	Overall	Rookie
Jan	Gary Gait	Curt Malawsky
Feb	Darris Kilgour	Jake Bergey
Mar	Mark Millon	Colin Doyle

== Statistics leaders ==
Bold numbers indicate new single-season records. Italics indicate tied single-season records.

Stat	Player	Team	Number
Goals	Gary Gait	Baltimore	**57**
Assists	Jim Veltman	Ontario	40
Points	Gary Gait	Baltimore	**85**
Penalty Minutes	Pat Coyle	Ontario	48
Shots on Goal	Gary Gait	Baltimore	**156**
Loose Balls	Jim Veltman	Ontario	**194**
Save Pct	Steve Dietrich	Rochester	77.9

== Attendance ==
=== Regular season ===
Home team	Home games	Average attendance	Total attendance
Philadelphia Wings	6	14,197	85,182
Buffalo Bandits	6	12,256	73,534
New York Saints	6	6,725	40,349
Rochester Knighthawks	6	6,706	40,234
Baltimore Thunder	6	5,378	32,269
Ontario Raiders	6	4,810	28,862
Syracuse Smash	6	4,230	25,378
**League**	**42**	**7,757**	**325,808**

=== Playoffs ===
Home team	Home games	Average attendance	Total attendance
Philadelphia Wings	2	9,288	19,655
Baltimore Thunder	2	3,282	6,564
**League**	**4**	**6,555**	**26,219**

== See also ==
- 1998 in sports
