= Rich Brzeski =

American lacrosse player (born 1978)

Personal information
- Nationality: American
- Born: May 26, 1978 (age 48)
- Height: 6 ft 2 in (188 cm)
- Weight: 215 lb (98 kg; 15 st 5 lb)

Sport
- Position: Defense
- NLL draft: 60th overall, 2000; Philadelphia Wings
- NLL teams: New York Titans; Philadelphia Wings
- NCAA team: Rutgers University
- Pro career: 2001–

Rich Brzeski (born May 26, 1978) is a former professional lacrosse player for the New York Titans and Philadelphia Wings in the National Lacrosse League

Brzeski played collegiate lacrosse at Rutgers University. He was drafted by the Philadelphia Wings in the 2000 NLL Entry Draft. Brzeski was acquired by the New York Titans prior to the 2007 NLL season in the 2006 NLL Expansion draft.
