= National Lacrosse League Rookie of the Year Award =

The National Lacrosse League Rookie of the Year Award is given annually to the top rookie in the National Lacrosse League. The award winners are chosen by a vote of the leagues coaches, general managers, and executives.

In 2006, the award was sponsored by S.C. Johnson and was known as the "Edge Active Care Rookie of the Year Award".

== Past winners ==
Season	Winner	Team	Other finalists
2026	CJ Kirst	Toronto Rock	Nolan Byrne, Georgia Swarm; Michael Grace, Georgia Swarm
2025	Dyson Williams	Albany FireWolves	Brennan O'Neill, Philadelphia Wings; Adam Poitras, Las Vegas Desert Dogs
2024	Alex Simmons	Albany FireWolves	Owen Grant, Vancouver Warriors; Tye Kurtz, Albany FireWolves
2023	Jonathan Donville	Panther City Lacrosse Club	Brett Dobson, Georgia Swarm; Jack Hannah, Las Vegas Desert Dogs
2022	Jeff Teat	New York Riptide	Reid Bowering, Vancouver Warriors; Patrick Dodds, Panther City Lacrosse Club
2021	Season cancelled		
2020	Tyson Gibson	New York Riptide	Connor Fields, San Diego Seals; Andrew Kew, New England Black Wolves
2019	Austin Staats	San Diego Seals	Ian MacKay, Buffalo Bandits; Matt Rambo, Philadelphia Wings
2018	Jake Withers	Rochester Knighthawks	Zach Currier, Calgary Roughnecks; Austin Shanks, Rochester Knighthawks
2017	Tom Schreiber	Toronto Rock	Kyle Jackson, Rochester Knighthawks; Latrell Harris, Toronto Rock
2016	Randy Staats	Georgia Swarm	Wesley Berg, Calgary Roughnecks; Jesse King, Georgia Swarm
2015	Ben McIntosh	Edmonton Rush	Jeremy Noble, Colorado Mammoth; Miles Thompson, Minnesota Swarm
2014	Logan Schuss	Minnesota Swarm	Robert Church, Edmonton Rush; Dillon Ward, Colorado Mammoth
2013	Mark Matthews	Edmonton Rush	
2012	Adam Jones	Colorado Mammoth	
2011	Curtis Dickson	Calgary Roughnecks	
2010	Stephan Leblanc	Toronto Rock	
2009	Rhys Duch	San Jose Stealth	
2008	Craig Point	Minnesota Swarm	
2007	Ryan Benesch	Toronto Rock	
2006	Brodie Merrill	Portland LumberJax	
2005	Ryan Boyle	San Jose Stealth	
2004	Taylor Wray	Calgary Roughnecks	
2003	Brian Langtry	Colorado Mammoth	
2002	Blaine Manning	Toronto Rock	
2001	Tracey Kelusky	Columbus Landsharks	
2000	John Grant, Jr.	Rochester Knighthawks	
1999	Jesse Hubbard	Baltimore Thunder	
1998	Colin Doyle	Ontario Raiders	
1997	Jeff Wilfong	Boston Blazers	
1996	Darren Fridge	Boston Blazers	
1995	Charlie Lockwood	New York Saints	
1994	Tom Marechek	Philadelphia Wings	
1993	No award given		
1992	Derek Keenan	Buffalo Bandits	
1991	Gary Gait	Detroit Turbos	
