= Mark Millon =

American lacrosse player (born 1971)

Personal information
- Nationality: American
- Born: May 17, 1971 (age 55) Huntington, New York, U.S.
- Height: 5 ft 9 in (175 cm)
- Weight: 185 lb (84 kg; 13 st 3 lb)

Sport
- Position: Attack
- Shoots: Right
- NLL draft: 4th overall, 1993; New York Saints
- NLL teams: New York Saints; Baltimore Thunder; Syracuse Smash; Philadelphia Wings
- MLL team Former teams: Rochester Rattlers; Baltimore/Wash Bayhawks; Boston Cannons; Long Island Lizards
- Pro career: 1994-2001 Club Lacrosse/ 2001-2006 Professional (MLL)–

Mark Millon (born May 17, 1971) is an American retired lacrosse player who last played for the Rochester Rattlers of Major League Lacrosse. He attended Harborfields Highschool in Huntington, Long Island. He played collegiate lacrosse at the University of Massachusetts. He is widely regarded as one of the greatest lacrosse players of all time, particularly known for his offensive prowess. He is also widely recognized as one of the best technical instructors and teachers in the sport.

== Playing career ==
Mark (Butterball) Millon was a college player at the University of Massachusetts Amherst, where he gained honors as a three-time All-American (twice on the first team), leading UMass to three berths in the NCAA tournament. After college, he moved to Baltimore and where he played alongside his brother Tony Millon while leading the Mount Washington Wolfpack to several US Club Lacrosse championships. During his time on the Wolfpack, he often relied upon his superior speed and agility to isolate one defenseman before dodging around him to score. This talent was noticed by the US Lacrosse World team coaches which included Millon on two rosters, earning a spot as one of the World's Best Attackman in 1998, the overall World Games MVP in the 1994 World Games, as well as being named to the All-World Team in 1994 and 1998.

He joined the Baltimore Bayhawks in 2001 and played with them until 2005 when he was traded to the Boston Cannons. He rejoined the Baltimore Bayhawks for the 2006 season, and played one game in the beginning of the 2007 season before announcing he would not play the remainder of the season due to other commitments. Later, in the season he joined the Long Island Lizards organization.

He retired again after the 2007 season as the league's all-time leading scorer.

Millon was selected in the 2013 MLL Supplemental Draft after announcing his return to the MLL after a five-season absence. He was selected first by the Rochester Rattlers and made his Rattlers debut on April 27, 2013, with a one goal-one-assist performance.

Mark also played nine seasons in the indoor National Lacrosse League. He played for the New York Saints, Baltimore Thunder, Syracuse Smash, and Philadelphia Wings.

== Later career ==
For 14 years, Mark has run the Millon International Lacrosse Camps, long considered the nation's top instructional lacrosse camp. His camp enrollment is nearly double that of the second biggest camps in the country.

In 2009, Millon was inducted into the National Lacrosse Hall of Fame.

Mark Millon Coached and was Director of Player and Coach Development for the Baltimore Breakers Club Lacrosse program from 2013 to 2014.

In 2015, Mark Millon became head of operations the Team 91 Lacrosse Club's new Maryland program, "Team 91 MD".

== MLL Honors ==
- Major League Lacrosse All-Star Game MVP 2001
- Major League Lacrosse MVP Award 2005
- Major League Lacrosse Offensive Player of the Year Award 2002, 2003

== Statistics ==
=== NLL ===
		Regular Season						Playoffs
Season	Team	GP	G	A	Pts	LB	PIM	GP	G	A	Pts	LB	PIM
1994	New York	8	6	8	14	22	8	1	0	0	0	1	4
1995	Baltimore	8	13	8	21	17	10	--	--	--	--	--	--
1996	Baltimore	10	25	10	35	33	10	--	--	--	--	--	--
1997	New York	10	27	22	49	31	17	1	0	2	2	6	4
1998	New York	12	40	18	58	33	18	--	--	--	--	--	--
1999	New York	12	26	28	54	29	14	--	--	--	--	--	--
2000	Syracuse	6	14	14	28	20	21	--	--	--	--	--	--
	Philadelphia	6	19	19	38	29	4	1	1	4	5	3	2
2001	Philadelphia	14	23	37	60	48	20	2	4	3	7	12	0
2002	Philadelphia	10	19	28	47	53	4	--	--	--	--	--	--
NLL totals		96	212	192	404	315	126	5	5	9	14	22	10

=== MLL ===
		Regular Season							Playoffs
Season	Team	GP	G	2ptG	A	Pts	LB	PIM	GP	G	2ptG	A	Pts	LB	PIM
2001	Baltimore	14	41	0	16	57	16	1.5	2	2	0	0	2	0	0
2002	Baltimore	14	44	0	19	63	18	1.5	2	6	0	3	9	1	1
2003	Baltimore	11	45	0	23	68	17	1	2	3	0	2	5	1	1
2004	Baltimore	12	38	4	19	61	23	2.5	1	0	0	4	4	0	0
2005	Boston	12	38	0	18	56	16	1	1	1	0	1	2	0	0
2006	Baltimore	12	28	0	13	41	13	2	-	-	-	-	-	-	-
2007	Washington	2	1	0	2	3	0	0	-	-	-	-	-	-	-
2007	Long Island	3	4	0	3	7	6	0	-	-	-	-	-	-	-
MLL Totals		80	239	4	114	357	109	9.5	8	12	0	10	22	2	2

4. MARK MILLON (1990–93) YEAR G 1990 14 1991 38 1992 45 1993 58 TOTALS 155 A P 5 19 13 51 17 62 23 81 58 213
