= National Lacrosse League MVP Award =

The National Lacrosse League Most Valuable Player Award is given annually to the NLL player who is considered to have contributed most to his team's success. The award winners are chosen by a vote of the league's coaches, general managers, and executives.

In 2006, the award was known as the "JetBlue National Lacrosse League MVP Award" and in 2007, it was known as the "Dodge Nitro National Lacrosse League MVP Award".

== Past winners ==
Season	Winner	Team	Win #	Other finalists
2026	Brett Dobson	Georgia Swarm	1	Keegan Bal, Vancouver Warriors; Dhane Smith, Buffalo Bandits
2025	Connor Fields	Rochester Knighthawks	1	Wesley Berg, San Diego Seals; Dhane Smith, Buffalo Bandits
2024	Josh Byrne	Buffalo Bandits	1	Dhane Smith, Buffalo Bandits; Nick Rose, Toronto Rock
2023	Christian Del Bianco	Calgary Roughnecks	1	Dhane Smith, Buffalo Bandits; Jeff Teat, New York Riptide
2022	Dhane Smith	Buffalo Bandits	2	Joe Resetarits, Albany FireWolves; Matt Vinc, Buffalo Bandits
2021	Season cancelled			
2020	Shayne Jackson	Georgia Swarm	1	Callum Crawford, New England Black Wolves; Rob Hellyer, Toronto Rock
2019	Dane Dobbie	Calgary Roughnecks	1	Lyle Thompson, Georgia Swarm; Matt Vinc, Buffalo Bandits
2018	Mark Matthews	Saskatchewan Rush	1	Robert Church, Saskatchewan Rush; Kevin Crowley, New England Black Wolves
2017	Lyle Thompson	Georgia Swarm	1	Corey Small, Vancouver Stealth; Mark Matthews, Saskatchewan Rush
2016	Dhane Smith	Buffalo Bandits	1	Shawn Evans, New England Black Wolves; Mark Matthews, Saskatchewan Rush
2015	Shawn Evans	Calgary Roughnecks	2	Mark Matthews, Edmonton Rush; Ryan Benesch, Buffalo Bandits
2014	Cody Jamieson	Rochester Knighthawks	1	Garrett Billings, Toronto Rock; Matt Vinc, Rochester Knighthawks
2013	Shawn Evans	Calgary Roughnecks	1	
2012	John Grant, Jr.	Colorado Mammoth	2	
2011	Jeff Shattler	Calgary Roughnecks	1	
2010	Casey Powell	Orlando Titans	1	
2009	Dan Dawson	Boston Blazers	1	
2008	Athan Iannucci	Philadelphia Wings	1	
2007	John Grant, Jr.	Rochester Knighthawks	1	
2006	Steve Dietrich	Buffalo Bandits	1	
2005	Colin Doyle	Toronto Rock	1	
2004	Jim Veltman	Toronto Rock	1	
2003	Gary Gait	Colorado Mammoth	6	
2002	Paul Gait	Washington Power	1	
2001	John Tavares	Buffalo Bandits	3	
2000	John Tavares	Buffalo Bandits	2	
1999	Gary Gait	Baltimore Thunder	5	
1998	Gary Gait	Baltimore Thunder	4	
1997	Gary Gait	Philadelphia Wings	3	
1996	Gary Gait	Philadelphia Wings	2	
1995	Gary Gait	Philadelphia Wings	1	
1994	John Tavares	Buffalo Bandits	1	

== See also ==
- Lt. Raymond Enners Award, MVP award of the NCAA men's college lacrosse
- Mike Kelley Memorial Trophy, MVP award of the Mann Cup series
