= Colin Doyle (lacrosse) =

Canadian lacrosse player (born 1977)

Personal information
- Nickname: Popeye
- Born: September 8, 1977 (age 48) Kitchener, Ontario, Canada
- Education: Wilfred Laurier University
- Height: 6 ft 3 in (191 cm)
- Weight: 215 lb (98 kg; 15 st 5 lb)

Sport
- Position: Forward
- Shoots: Left
- NLL teams: Toronto Rock; San Jose Stealth; Ontario Raiders
- MLL team: Toronto Nationals
- MSL team: Six Nations Chiefs
- Pro career: 1998–2016

Colin "Popeye" Doyle (born September 8, 1977) is a Canadian former professional lacrosse player and captain for the Toronto Rock of the National Lacrosse League and the Six Nations Chiefs of Major Series Lacrosse.

== National Lacrosse League (NLL) career ==
Doyle was born in Kitchener, Ontario. He began his NLL career in 1998, playing for Ontario Raiders. He scored 34 goals and 27 assists, leading the Raiders in scoring. He was named NLL Rookie of the Year.

In 1999, the Raiders moved to Toronto, becoming the Toronto Rock, where they won their first of 6 NLL Championships. Doyle finished first or second in Rock scoring every year from 1999 until 2005, and was named league MVP in 2005. He has been named playoff MVP an unprecedented three times — in 1999, 2002, and 2005.

On December 27, 2006, the Rock traded Doyle, Darren Halls, and a draft pick to the San Jose Stealth for Ryan Benesch, Kevin Fines, Chad Thompson, and two draft picks.

Just after the 2009 season began, Doyle was named by Paul Tutka of NLLInsider.com as the top player in the league, stating that Doyle "has become today's most stellar offensive leader, creating a relationship with Jeff Zywicki that is turning out to be one of the most lethal in the NLL." Tutka also praised Doyle's commitment to his teammates:

Doyle has also shown to be maybe the most versatile ball player in the sport over the years... altering his game to ensure an unparalleled chemistry is sparked between him and his teammate (usually teammates). It's an unselfishness rarely seen by superstar players in any sport, not just lacrosse, and is definitely comparable to what John Tavares did in his prime with some classic Buffalo Bandits teams in the early and mid-1990s.

Doyle was named a starter to the All-Star Game in both 2009 and 2012.

On December 14, 2009, almost three years after they traded him away, the Rock re-acquired Doyle from the Stealth for Lewis Ratcliff, Tyler Codron, and Joel Dalgarno.

On November 9, 2016, Doyle announced his retirement from lacrosse.

== Major League Lacrosse (MLL) career ==
2008 - Member of Rochester Rattlers, MLL Champions
2009 - Member of Toronto Nationals (now Hamilton Nationals), MLL Champions

== Mann Cup career ==
The Mann Cup is the trophy awarded to the senior men's lacrosse champions of Canada. The championship series is played between the British Columbia Western Lacrosse Association (WLA) champion and the Ontario Major Series Lacrosse (MSL) champion.

Doyle has been a Mann Cup winner with both a WLA team and an MSL team.

2001 - Member of Coquitlam Adanacs, winners of the Mann Cup, WLA champions
2003 - Member of Brampton Excelsiors (MSL), finalists in the Mann Cup, MSL champions
2007 - Member of Coquitlam Adanacs, finalists in the Mann Cup, WLA champions
2008 - Member of Brampton Excelsiors (MSL), winners of the Mann Cup, MSL champions
2009 - Member of Brampton Excelsiors (MSL), winners of the Mann Cup, MSL champions
2013 - Member of Six Nations Chiefs, winners of the Mann Cup, MSL champions
2014 - Member of Six Nations Chiefs, winners of the Mann Cup, MSL champions

Bible of Lacrosse Mann Cup Stats
MSL Statistics 2010-2014 - Colin Doyle
MSL Statistics 2009 - Colin Doyle
WLA Statistics 2007 - Colin Doyle
WLA Statistics 2005 - Colin Doyle

== International lacrosse career ==
2002 - Member of Team Canada, finalists in the Heritage Cup and World Lacrosse Championship
2003 - Member of Team Canada, winners of the World Indoor Lacrosse Championships in Hamilton, Ontario
2004 - Member of Team Canada, winners of the Heritage Cup
2006 - Member of Team Canada, winners of the World Lacrosse Championship in London, Ontario

== Statistics ==
=== NLL ===
Colin Doyle		Regular season									Playoffs								
Season	Team	GP	G	A	Pts	LB	PIM	Pts/GP	LB/GP	PIM/GP	GP	G	A	Pts	LB	PIM	Pts/GP	LB/GP	PIM/GP
1998	Ontario Raiders	12	34	27	61	49	16	5.08	4.08	1.33	–	–	–	–	–	–	–	–	–
1999	Toronto Rock	12	17	37	54	60	24	4.50	5.00	2.00	2	5	3	8	8	2	4.00	4.00	1.00
2000	Toronto Rock	11	16	26	42	43	35	3.82	3.91	3.18	2	3	6	9	4	4	4.50	2.00	2.00
2001	Toronto Rock	14	26	33	59	55	28	4.21	3.93	2.00	2	0	4	4	3	4	2.00	1.50	2.00
2002	Toronto Rock	16	47	33	80	58	17	5.00	3.63	1.06	2	5	2	7	6	2	3.50	3.00	1.00
2003	Toronto Rock	16	39	55	94	63	16	5.88	3.94	1.00	2	5	2	7	5	0	3.50	2.50	0.00
2004	Toronto Rock	16	33	55	88	64	22	5.50	4.00	1.38	1	3	1	4	8	0	4.00	8.00	0.00
2005	Toronto Rock	16	42	69	111	94	21	6.94	5.88	1.31	2	6	4	10	16	0	5.00	8.00	0.00
2006	Toronto Rock	16	43	53	96	67	4	6.00	4.19	0.25	1	1	3	4	5	0	4.00	5.00	0.00
2007	San Jose Stealth	16	22	59	81	58	14	5.06	3.63	0.88	2	1	15	16	11	0	8.00	5.50	0.00
2008	San Jose Stealth	16	27	61	88	45	12	5.50	2.81	0.75	1	3	2	5	2	0	5.00	2.00	0.00
2009	San Jose Stealth	16	38	73	111	63	12	6.94	3.94	0.75	2	2	8	10	6	0	5.00	3.00	0.00
2010	Toronto Rock	16	22	62	84	68	21	5.25	4.25	1.31	3	7	8	15	16	0	5.00	5.33	0.00
2011	Toronto Rock	16	27	43	70	76	8	4.38	4.75	0.50	3	4	7	11	12	2	3.67	4.00	0.67
2012	Toronto Rock	13	25	34	59	37	10	4.54	2.85	0.77	2	4	4	8	25	0	4.00	12.50	0.00
2013	Toronto Rock	15	26	58	84	41	13	5.60	2.73	0.87	1	3	3	6	7	0	6.00	7.00	0.00
2014	Toronto Rock	18	31	41	72	48	21	4.00	2.67	1.17	1	3	5	8	0	0	8.00	0.00	0.00
2015	Toronto Rock	1	2	3	5	3	0	5.00	3.00	0.00	4	5	5	10	11	2	2.50	2.75	0.50
2016	Toronto Rock	10	10	35	45	31	11	4.50	3.10	1.10	–	–	–	–	–	–	–	–	–
		266	527	857	1,384	1,023	305	5.20	3.85	1.15	33	60	82	142	145	16	4.30	4.39	0.48
Career Total:		299	587	939	1,526	1,168	321	5.10	3.91	1.07									

GP–Games played; G–Goals; A–Assists; Pts–Points; LB–Loose balls; PIM–Penalty minutes; Pts/GP–Points per games played; LB/GP–Loose balls per games played; PIM/GP–Penalty minutes per games played.

== Awards ==
Preceded by Jeff Wilfong	NLL Rookie of the Year; 1998	Succeeded by Jesse Hubbard
Preceded by Dallas Eliuk	Champion's Cup MVP; 1999	Succeeded by Dan Stroup
Preceded by Dallas Eliuk	Champion's Cup MVP; 2002	Succeeded by Bob Watson
Preceded by Jim Veltman	NLL Most Valuable Player; 2005	Succeeded by Steve Dietrich
Preceded by Curtis Palidwor	Champion's Cup MVP; 2005	Succeeded by Gavin Prout
Preceded by Chris Driscoll	Toronto Rock captain 2010–2016	Succeeded by Brodie Merrill
