= Washington Power =

American professional lacrosse team (2001–02)

- Sport: Box lacrosse
- First season: 2001
- Last season: 2002
- League: National Lacrosse League
- Division: Eastern
- Team history: Baltimore Thunder (1987–1999); Pittsburgh CrosseFire (2000)
- Based in: Washington, D.C.
- Arena: MCI Center (2001); Capital Centre (2002)
- Colors: Blue, Red, White
- Division titles: 1 (2002)
- Later: Colorado Mammoth (2003–Present)

The Washington Power were a member of the National Lacrosse League during the 2001 and 2002 seasons. After the inaugural championship in 1987 in Baltimore (as the Thunder) through 1999 and an unsuccessful stint in Pittsburgh (as the CrosseFire), the franchise moved to Washington, D.C. in 2001, with a new ownership structure led by Steve Comiskey, a DC attorney to high-tech billionaires, Wall Street executive Gene Podsiadlo, and star player Gary Gait. After two seasons of low attendance in Washington, the franchise moved again, this time to Denver, Colorado, as the Colorado Mammoth. In Colorado they have seen success both on and off the field, culminating in 2006, when they had the highest attendance in the league, and also won the Champion's Cup.

== Awards & honors ==
Year	Player	Award
2002	Paul Gait	Most Valuable Player

== All-time record ==
Season	Division	W-L	Finish	Home	Road	GF	GA	Coach	Playoffs
2001		9–5	4th	4–3	5–2	226	204	Darris Kilgour	Lost in semifinals
2002	Eastern	9–7	1st	6–2	3–5	253	243	Darris Kilgour	Lost in semifinals
Total	2 seasons	18–12		10–5	8–7	479	447		

== Playoff results ==
Season	Game	Visiting	Home
2001	Semifinals	Washington 9	Toronto 10
2002	Quarterfinals	Washington 12	Philadelphia 11
2002	Semifinals	Washington 11	Toronto 12
