= 1999 NLL season =

- League: National Lacrosse League
- Sport: Indoor lacrosse
- Duration: December 26, 1998 – April 23, 1999
- Games: 12
- Teams: 7

Regular season
- League champions: Toronto Rock
- Runners-up: Baltimore Thunder
- Season MVP: Gary Gait (Baltimore Thunder)
- Top scorer: Gary Gait (Baltimore Thunder)

Champion's Cup
- Champions: Toronto Rock (1st title)
- Runners-up: Rochester Knighthawks
- Finals MVP: Colin Doyle (Toronto)

NLL seasons
- ← 1998 season 2000 season →

The 1999 National Lacrosse League season is the 13th season in the NLL that began on December 26, 1998, and concluded with the championship game on April 23, 1999. The Toronto Rock celebrated their first season in Toronto by winning the championship, defeating the Rochester Knighthawks 13–10 at Maple Leaf Gardens.

The playoffs featured the lowest score by a team in NLL history, when goaltender Bob Watson and the Toronto Rock defeated the Philadelphia Wings 13–2.

== Team movement ==
The only change of teams from the 1998 NLL season to 1999 was the movement of the Ontario Raiders from Hamilton down the QEW to Toronto to become the Toronto Rock.

=== Teams ===
1999 National Lacrosse League
Team	City	Arena	Capacity
Baltimore Thunder	Baltimore, Maryland	Baltimore Arena	10,582
Buffalo Bandits	Buffalo, New York	Marine Midland Arena	18,595
New York Saints	Uniondale, New York	Nassau Veterans Memorial Coliseum	16,297
Philadelphia Wings	Philadelphia, Pennsylvania	First Union Center	19,519
Rochester Knighthawks	Rochester, New York	Blue Cross Arena	10,662
Syracuse Smash	Syracuse, New York	Onondaga County War Memorial	5,800
Toronto Rock	Toronto, Ontario	Maple Leaf Gardens	15,726

=== Map of teams ===
National Lacrosse League Teams

== Regular season ==
P	Team	GP	W	L	PCT	GB	Home	Road	GF	GA	Diff	GF/GP	GA/GP
1	Toronto Rock – xyz	12	9	3	.750	0.0	6–0	3–3	157	139	+18	13.08	11.58
2	Baltimore Thunder – x	12	8	4	.667	1.0	5–1	3–3	211	175	+36	17.58	14.58
3	Rochester Knighthawks – x	12	8	4	.667	1.0	4–2	4–2	169	160	+9	14.08	13.33
4	Philadelphia Wings – x	12	5	7	.417	4.0	4–2	1–5	153	153	−-0	12.75	12.75
5	New York Saints	12	5	7	.417	4.0	2–4	3–3	149	156	−7	12.42	13.00
6	Buffalo Bandits	12	4	8	.333	5.0	1–5	3–3	158	177	−19	13.17	14.75
7	Syracuse Smash	12	3	9	.250	6.0	3–3	0–6	161	198	−37	13.42	16.50

x: Clinched playoff berth; c: Clinched playoff berth by crossing over to another division; y: Clinched division; z: Clinched best regular season record; GP: Games Played
W: Wins; L: Losses; GB: Games back; PCT: Win percentage; Home: Record at Home; Road: Record on the Road; GF: Goals scored; GA: Goals allowed
Differential: Difference between goals scored and allowed; GF/GP: Average number of goals scored per game; GA/GP: Average number of goals allowed per game

== All Star Game ==
The 1999 All-Star Game took place at the Blue Cross Arena in Rochester, where Team Canada defeated Team USA by a score of 25–24.

== Playoffs ==
Semifinals
4	Philadelphia	2
1	Toronto	13
3	Rochester	14
2	Baltimore	12

Championship
3	Rochester	10
1	Toronto	13

== Awards ==
Award	Winner	Team
MVP Award	Gary Gait	Baltimore
Rookie of the Year Award	Jesse Hubbard	Baltimore
Championship Game MVP	Colin Doyle	Toronto

=== Weekly awards ===
Each week, a player is awarded "Player of the Week" honours.

Week	Player of the Week
1	Sal LoCascio
2	Matt Shearer
3	Gary Gait (tie); Paul Gait
4	Joe Hiltz
5	Derek General
6	John Tavares
7	Jake Bergey
8	Gary Gait
9	Bob Watson
10	Jake Bergey
11	Dallas Eliuk
12	Jake Bergey
13	Pat O'Toole
14	Jim Veltman
15	Gary Gait
16	Paul Gait

=== Monthly awards ===
Awards are also given out monthly for the best overall player and best rookie.

Month	Overall	Rookie
Jan	Gary Gait	Chris Sanderson
Feb	Bob Watson	Matt Disher
Mar	Jake Bergey	Casey Powell

== Statistics leaders ==
Bold numbers indicate new single-season records. Italics indicate tied single-season records.

Stat	Player	Team	Number
Goals	Gary Gait	Baltimore	50
Assists	Joe Hiltz	Baltimore	**46**
Points	Gary Gait	Baltimore	82
Penalty Minutes	Tony Millon	Syracuse	**59**
Shots on Goal	Gary Gait	Baltimore	**157**
	Tom Marechek	Philadelphia	**157**
Loose Balls	Jim Veltman	Toronto	166
Save Pct	Dallas Eliuk	Philadelphia	76.4

== Attendance ==
=== Regular season ===
Home team	Home games	Average attendance	Total attendance
Philadelphia Wings	6	16,040	96,237
Toronto Rock	6	11,075	66,451
Buffalo Bandits	6	9,638	57,829
Rochester Knighthawks	6	9,067	54,400
Baltimore Thunder	6	7,057	42,340
New York Saints	6	6,704	40,223
Syracuse Smash	6	4,546	27,277
**League**	**42**	**9,161**	**384,757**

=== Playoffs ===
Home team	Home games	Average attendance	Total attendance
Toronto Rock	2	13,859	27,717
Baltimore Thunder	1	6,325	6,325
**League**	**3**	**11,347**	**34,042**

== See also ==
- 1999 in sports
