= Dave Stilley =

American lacrosse player (born 1974)

Personal information
- Nationality: American
- Born: January 8, 1974 (age 52) Philadelphia, Pennsylvania, U.S.

Sport
- Position: Defenseman
- Shoots: Right
- NLL draft: 30th overall, 1997; Philadelphia Wings
- NLL teams: New York Titans; Colorado Mammoth; Philadelphia Wings
- MLL teams: New Jersey Pride
- Pro career: 1998–2009

Dave Stilley (born January 8, 1974) is an American lacrosse player. He has played for the New York Titans, Colorado Mammoth and the Philadelphia Wings in the National Lacrosse League, and also the New Jersey Pride in Major League Lacrosse. Stilley won NLL titles in 1998 and 2001 with the Wings, and in 2006 in Colorado. He was selected in the 11th round in the first ever MLL Collegiate Draft.

Stilley was a two time All-American while attending Duke University, and also a prep All American at Haverford School. He retired from the MLL in 2005, and from all lacrosse after the 2007 NLL season. Prior to the 2009 NLL season Stilley came out of retirement to join the New York Titans.

Stilley joined the Philadelphia Wings front office as Assistant GM under Johnny Mouradian for the 2010 MLL Season.

Stilley returned to coaching, joining the Shipley School Gators in Bryn Mawr, PA for the 2012 season. He was also hired as the defensive coordinator for the Reading Rockets of the Professional Lacrosse League, which only lasted one season.

In 2015, the Colorado Mammoth named an award after him, which is given to the best defender on the team. The inaugural award was given to Dan Coates.

== Statistics ==
=== NLL ===
| | | Regular Season | | | | | | Playoffs |
| Season | Team | GP | G | A | Pts | LB | PIM | GP | G | A | Pts | LB | PIM |
|---|---|---|---|---|---|---|---|---|---|---|---|---|---|
| 1998 | Philadelphia | 2 | 0 | 1 | 1 | 0 | 7 | -- | -- | -- | -- | -- | -- |
| 1999 | Philadelphia | 2 | 0 | 0 | 0 | 4 | 4 | -- | -- | -- | -- | -- | -- |
| 2000 | Philadelphia | 9 | 1 | 3 | 4 | 37 | 36 | 1 | 0 | 1 | 1 | 0 | 3 |
| 2001 | Philadelphia | 12 | 0 | 6 | 6 | 28 | 56 | 2 | 0 | 2 | 2 | 0 | 8 |
| 2002 | Philadelphia | 14 | 0 | 6 | 6 | 39 | 58 | 1 | 0 | 0 | 0 | 4 | 3 |
| 2003 | Colorado | 7 | 0 | 2 | 2 | 16 | 16 | 2 | 0 | 0 | 0 | 20 | 1 |
| 2004 | Colorado | 14 | 1 | 9 | 10 | 18 | 61 | 1 | 0 | 0 | 0 | 7 | 3 |
| 2005 | Colorado | 15 | 2 | 3 | 5 | 31 | 49 | 1 | 0 | 0 | 0 | 0 | 2 |
| 2006 | Colorado | 12 | 0 | 2 | 2 | 64 | 23 | 3 | 0 | 2 | 2 | 5 | 6 |
| 2007 | Colorado | 12 | 2 | 4 | 6 | 25 | 20 | 1 | 0 | 0 | 0 | 6 | 0 |
| 2009 | New York | 11 | 0 | 2 | 2 | 25 | 28 | 3 | 0 | 1 | 1 | 7 | 2 |
| NLL totals | | 110 | 6 | 38 | 44 | 287 | 358 | 15 | 0 | 6 | 6 | 49 | 28 |

=== MLL ===
| | | Regular Season | | | | | | | Playoffs |
| Season | Team | GP | G | 2ptG | A | Pts | LB | PIM | GP | G | 2ptG | A | Pts | LB | PIM |
|---|---|---|---|---|---|---|---|---|---|---|---|---|---|---|---|
| 2001 | New Jersey | 12 | 1 | 0 | 1 | 2 | 14 | 3.5 | 0 | 0 | 0 | 0 | 0 | 0 | 0 |
| 2002 | New Jersey | 11 | 0 | 0 | 0 | 0 | 21 | 2 | 1 | 0 | 0 | 0 | 0 | 3 | 0 |
| 2003 | New Jersey | 12 | 0 | 0 | 0 | 0 | 22 | 7 | 1 | 0 | 0 | 0 | 0 | 0 | 2 |
| 2005 | New Jersey | 12 | 1 | 0 | 1 | 2 | 12 | 6.5 | 0 | 0 | 0 | 0 | 0 | 0 | 0 |
| MLL Totals | | 47 | 2 | 0 | 2 | 4 | 69 | 19 | 2 | 0 | 0 | 0 | 0 | 3 | 2 |
