= Baltimore Thunder =

Former NLL professional box lacrosse team

- Sport: Box lacrosse
- Founded: 1987
- Last season: 1999
- League: National Lacrosse League
- Location: Baltimore, Maryland
- Arena: Baltimore Arena
- Colors: Red, Yellow, Black
- Championships: 1 (1987)
- Division titles: 1 (1991)
- Later: Pittsburgh CrosseFire (2000); Washington Power (2001–2002); Colorado Mammoth (2003–present)

The Baltimore Thunder were an American professional box lacrosse team and a member of the National Lacrosse League from 1987 until 1999. They were based in Baltimore, Maryland, and won the first then-Eagle Pro Box Lacrosse League championship in 1987. After the 1999 season, the franchise moved three times, becoming the Pittsburgh CrosseFire in 2000, the Washington Power in 2001, and finally the Colorado Mammoth in 2003, where it remains as of 2026.

== Awards and honors ==
Year	Player	Award
1987	Buzz Sheain	Championship Game MVP
1998	Gary Gait	Most Valuable Player
1999	Gary Gait	Most Valuable Player
1999	Jesse Hubbard	Rookie of the Year

== All time record ==
Season	Division	W-L	Finish	Home	Road	GF	GA	Coach	Playoffs
1987		2–4	4th	1–2	1–2	79	82	Bob Griebe	Won Championship
1988		2–6	4th	2–2	0–4	98	122	John Stewart	Missed playoffs
1989		4–4	4th	2–2	2–2	99	96	John Stewart	Missed playoffs
1990		4–4	4th	2–2	2–2	96	95	John Stewart	Missed playoffs
1991	American	6–4	1st	3–2	3–2	156	157	John Stewart	Lost in semifinals
1992	American	3–5	3rd	2–2	1–3	117	147	John Stewart	Lost in division semifinals
1993	American	2–6	3rd	1–3	1–3	122	147	John Stewart	Missed playoffs
1994	American	1–7	3rd	1–3	0–4	93	113	Skip Lichtfuss	Missed playoffs
1995		3–5	5th	2–2	1–3	98	117	Skip Lichtfuss	Missed playoffs
1996		4–6	5th	3–2	1–4	144	163	Skip Lichtfuss	Missed playoffs
1997		2–8	6th	1–4	1–4	125	165	John Tucker	Missed playoffs
1998		8–4	2nd	4–2	4–2	184	160	John Tucker	Lost Championship
1999		8–4	2nd	5–1	3–3	211	175	John Tucker	Lost in semifinals
Total	13 seasons	49–67		29–29	20–38	1,622	1,739	1 championship	

== Playoff results ==
Season	Game	Visiting	Home
1987	Semifinals	Baltimore 14	New Jersey 9
1987	Championships	Baltimore 11	Washington 10
1991	Semifinals	Baltimore 12	Detroit 14
1992	Division Semifinals	Baltimore 12	Philadelphia 14
1998	Semifinals	Rochester 14	Baltimore 15
1998	Championship (Game 1)	Baltimore 12	Philadelphia 16
1998	Championship (Game 2)	Philadelphia 17	Baltimore 12
1999	Semifinals	Rochester 14	Baltimore 12

== Championships ==
Preceded by None	Eagle Pro Box Lacrosse League Champions; 1987	Succeeded by New Jersey Saints
