= Syracuse Smash =

Former NLL professional box lacrosse team

- Based in: Syracuse, New York
- Arena: War Memorial at Oncenter
- Colors: black, blue, white and gray
- Later: Ottawa Rebel 2001–2003 & Edmonton Rush 2005-2015
- Currently: Saskatchewan Rush 2016-Present

The Syracuse Smash were a member of the National Lacrosse League from 1998 to 2000. They were based in Syracuse, New York. The team finished last in the standings each of their three seasons, before moving to Ottawa, Ontario to become the Ottawa Rebel. In their three seasons in the NLL, the Smash never won a game on the road.

== All time Record ==
Season	Division	W-L	Finish	Home	Road	GF	GA	Coach	Playoffs
1998		2-10	7th	2-4	0-6	163	219	Kevin Alexander	Missed playoffs
1999		3-9	7th	3-3	0-6	161	198	Freeman Bucktooth, Pat Donahue, Steve Scaramuzzino	Missed playoffs
2000		1-11	8th	1-5	0-6	135	207	Pat Donahue	Missed playoffs
Total	3 seasons	6-30		6-12	0-18	459	624		

== Schedule ==
=== 1998 schedule ===
Game	Date	Opponent	Location	Score	OT	Attendance	Record
1	January 3, 1998	@ Baltimore Thunder	1st Mariner Arena	L 13–23		2,954	0–1
2	January 10, 1998	@ Rochester Knighthawks	Blue Cross Arena	L 12–17		6,836	0–2
3	January 17, 1998	Rochester Knighthawks	Oncenter War Memorial Arena	W 14–12		4,671	1–2
4	January 24, 1998	Philadelphia Wings	Oncenter War Memorial Arena	L 15–17		3,755	1–3
5	January 30, 1998	Baltimore Thunder	Oncenter War Memorial Arena	L 11–20		4,743	1–4
6	January 31, 1998	@ New York Saints	Nassau Veterans Memorial Coliseum	L 10–23		7,857	1–5
7	February 13, 1998	@ Philadelphia Wings	Wachovia Center	L 11–14		13,213	1–6
8	February 21, 1998	New York Saints	Oncenter War Memorial Arena	W 19–17		3,914	2–6
9	March 7, 1998	@ Ontario Raiders	Copps Coliseum	L 11–15		3,416	2–7
10	March 27, 1998	Ontario Raiders	Oncenter War Memorial Arena	L 21–22	OT	4,211	2–8
11	April 4, 1998	Buffalo Bandits	Oncenter War Memorial Arena	L 16–20		4,084	2–9
12	April 11, 1998	@ Buffalo Bandits	KeyBank Center	L 10–19		12,745	2–10

=== 1999 schedule ===
Game	Date	Opponent	Location	Score	OT	Attendance	Record
1	January 9, 1999	Philadelphia Wings	Oncenter War Memorial Arena	W 19–12		5,213	1–0
2	January 23, 1999	@ Rochester Knighthawks	Blue Cross Arena	L 13–20		9,151	1–1
3	January 29, 1999	@ Buffalo Bandits	HSBC Arena	L 16–17		8,129	1–2
4	February 5, 1998	Baltimore Thunder	Oncenter War Memorial Arena	W 15–14		4,984	2–2
5	February 26, 1998	Rochester Knighthawks	Oncenter War Memorial Arena	L 15–17		5,347	2–3
6	February 28, 1998	@ New York Saints	Nassau Veterans Memorial Coliseum	L 8–13		6,337	2–4
7	March 6, 1998	@ Philadelphia Wings	Wachovia Center	L 6–15		15,678	2–5
8	March 13, 1999	Toronto Rock	Oncenter War Memorial Arena	L 12–19		4,237	2–6
9	March 26, 1999	@ Toronto Rock	Maple Leaf Gardens	L 12–19		13,300	2–7
10	March 27, 1999	New York Saints	Oncenter War Memorial Arena	L 14–15		4,044	2–8
11	April 3, 1999	@ Baltimore Thunder	1st Mariner Arena	L 17–26		7,132	2–9
12	April 10, 1999	Buffalo Bandits	Oncenter War Memorial Arena	W 14–11		3,452	3–9
