= Albany Attack =

- Sport: Box lacrosse
- Founded: 2000
- Last season: 2003
- League: National Lacrosse League
- Division: Central
- Location: Albany, New York
- Arena: Pepsi Arena
- Colors: Navy Blue, Columbia Blue, Silver, White
- Division titles: 1 (2002)
- Later: San Jose Stealth (2004–2009); Washington Stealth (2010–2013); Vancouver Stealth/Warriors (2014–Present)

The Albany Attack was the name of a franchise which played in the National Lacrosse League (NLL) from the 2000 season through the 2003 season. The Attack played in the former Pepsi Arena in Albany, New York (now known as MVP Arena). After the 2003 season, the franchise was sold and moved to San Jose, California and renamed the San Jose Stealth. The current incarnation of the franchise, now owned by Canucks Sports & Entertainment, is the Vancouver Warriors.

== Awards and honors ==
| Year | Player | Award |
|---|---|---|
| 2002 | Bob McMahon | Coach of the Year |
| 2002 | Rob Blasdell | Goaltender of the Year |
| 2003 | Jim Moss | Defensive Player of the Year |

== All time record ==
| Season | Division | W-L | Finish | Home | Road | GF | GA | Coach | Playoffs |
|---|---|---|---|---|---|---|---|---|---|
| 2000 | | 6–6 | T-5th | 4–2 | 2–4 | 169 | 160 | Terry Sanderson | Missed playoffs |
| 2001 | | 5–9 | 7th | 3–4 | 2–5 | 152 | 169 | Terry Sanderson | Missed playoffs |
| 2002 | Central | 14–2 | 1st | 7–1 | 7–1 | 250 | 194 | Bob McMahon | Lost Championship |
| 2003 | Central | 8–8 | T-7th | 4–4 | 4–4 | 198 | 191 | Bob McMahon | Missed playoffs |
| Total | 4 seasons | 33–25 | | 18–11 | 15–14 | 769 | 714 | | |

== Playoff results ==
| Season | Game | Visiting | Home |
|---|---|---|---|
| 2002 | Semifinals | Rochester 10 | Albany 14 |
| 2002 | Championships | Toronto 13 | Albany 12 |

=== 2001-02 schedule ===
| Game | Date | Opponent | Location | Score | OT | Attendance | Record |
|---|---|---|---|---|---|---|---|
| 1 | November 16, 2001 | New Jersey Storm | Times Union Center | W 20–16 | | 4,608 | 1–0 |
| 2 | November 24, 2001 | @ Rochester Knighthawks | Blue Cross Arena | L 16–22 | | 8,343 | 1–1 |
| 3 | December 1, 2001 | Philadelphia Wings | Times Union Center | W 20–16 | | 3,114 | 2–1 |
| 7 | January 19, 2002 | Ottawa Rebel | Times Union Center | W 18–17 | | 3,027 | 3–1 |
| 15 | March 15, 2002 | @ Montreal Express | Bell Centre | W 14–13 | | 7,346 | 4–1 |
| 16 | March 24, 2002 | Montreal Express | Times Union Center | W 14–6 | | 3,562 | 5–1 |

== 2002 highlights ==
A banner commemorating the 2001–02 season

The 2002 (called then the 2001–2002) Albany Attack team was the most successful Attack team during the franchise's four years in Albany, New York. It is the only Attack team to have made the NLL playoffs. (Note: The San Jose Stealth made the NLL playoffs in their inaugural season, 2004, as well as the 2007 and 2008 seasons.) The team went 14–2 in the regular season winning the Central Division championship, and went 15–3 overall having lost to the Toronto Rock in the 2002 NLL Champion's Cup Game in Albany.

- Before the season began, head coach Terry Sanderson left the Albany Attack to become the head coach of the expansion Montréal Express. He was replaced by Bob McMahon.
- The 2002 season began in Albany on November 16, 2001. On that date, the Albany Attack defeated the expansion New Jersey Storm, who were playing their first game. Storm owner and former NBA star Jayson Williams was in attendance.
- With a regular season record of 14–2, and overall record of 15–3, the Albany Attack established new NLL records for most regular season wins and most overall wins.
- The Attack finished first in the Central Division, one game ahead of the Rochester Knighthawks who had finished with a regular season record of 13–3, the second best in the NLL that season. Ironically, those two Attack regular season losses were both to Rochester; one game in Albany and another in Rochester.
- In the playoffs, the Albany Attack (the #1 seed) had a bye during the first round. They then hosted and defeated the Rochester Knighthawks (the #4 seed), 14–10, in a semifinal game with an attendance of 5074. On Saturday April 13, 2002, the Albany Attack hosted the #2 seed Toronto Rock for the Champion's Cup, but they lost to Toronto by a score of 13–12 in front of 9289 fans.
- Head Coach Bob McMahon was named NLL Head Coach of the Year.
- Forward Josh Sanderson established a new NLL record for Most Assists (68). (Update: In the 2005 season, Sanderson, then with the Toronto Rock, broke his own record and accumulated 71 assists.)
- Goalie Rob Blasdell was named 2002 Goalie of the Year.
- Forward Josh Sanderson and Goalie Rob Blasdell were selected to the NLL All-Pro First Team.
- Five Albany Attack players were selected to play on the South Team of the 2002 NLL All-Star Game: Rob Blasdell (G, starter), Cam Woods (D, starter), Jim Moss (D), Josh Sanderson (F, starter), and Gary Rosyski (F). The head coach of the South Team was the Albany Attack head coach, Bob McMahon.

== Attendance problems ==
For various reasons, the Albany Attack were plagued by poor attendance most of their existence with average attendances in the 3000–4000 range which was not enough for the franchise to be profitable.

On June 14, 2001, Albany Attack owner Herb Chorbajian, a banker with CharterOne Bank, and Albany River Rats owner Walter Robb announced an agreement in which Robb would purchase a minority equity share in the Albany Attack. Given both teams played in the Pepsi Arena, the purpose of the agreement was to establish marketing and promotional synergy.

Despite the agreement, the Albany Attack was still not profitable so, throughout the 2002 season, Herb Chorbajian considered selling the Albany Attack. However, the success of the playoffs encouraged him to keep the team for another season. Furthermore, in the summer of 2002, the Albany Attack Pack, the Official Fan Club of the Albany Attack, was created by several fans with hopes of improving attendance.

Bob McMahon (left) and Herb Chorbajian after the final Albany Attack game. (Albany defeated the Vancouver Ravens in Albany on Saturday April 12, 2003.)

In the 2003 season, according to Albany Attack General Manager Michael DeRossi, season ticket sales did go up considerably over the previous season, but the marketing effort actually decreased. Furthermore, the Attack went only 2–6 in their first eight games, losing all four home games to that point. While the Attack did have a second half record of 6–2, they never recovered enough to return to the playoffs nor did they have sufficient attendance to be profitable.

== Move to San Jose ==
With no significant improvement in attendance throughout the 2003 season, the Albany Attack were destined to be a financial loss for a fourth consecutive year. During that season, there were numerous rumors that Mr. Chorbajian was going to sell the franchise, in particular to a group from San Jose, California.

On June 9, 2003, the rumors were confirmed when an announcement was made that the Albany Attack franchise was sold and relocated to San Jose, California where it was located until 2009. Mr. Chorbajian retained a share in the franchise. This may no longer be the case as the team has since been resold.

During the summer of 2003, the new owners had a "Name the Team Contest" and, on September 16, 2003, the winner, a high school sophomore from San Jose, elected to officially rename the team the San Jose Stealth.

On June 17, 2009, the Stealth announced it would be moving to Everett, Washington effective immediately. The newly renamed Washington Stealth played their home games at the Comcast Arena at Everett beginning in the 2010 season. Four years later, they relocated again to Vancouver, BC, becoming the Vancouver Stealth.

Jerseys of the Albany Attack franchise (1999–2003) of the National Lacrosse League. The dark jersey was traditionally the road jersey; the light jersey was traditionally the home jersey. The jerseys were manufactured by ProJoy.
