= Upstate Medical University Arena =

Arena in Syracuse, New York

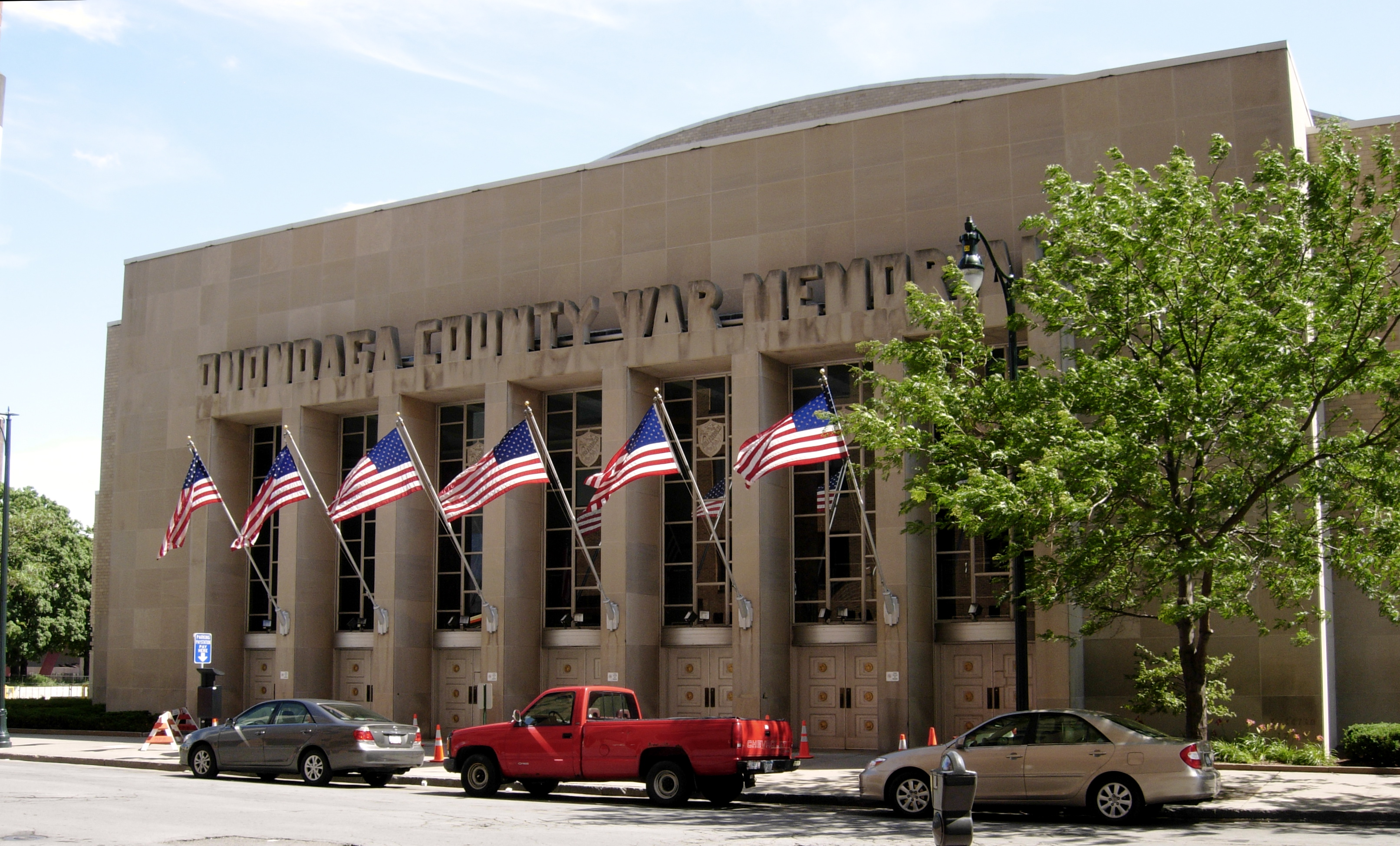
- Exterior of the venue (c.2008)

- Location within New York Location within the United States
- Full name: Upstate Medical University Arena at Onondaga County War Memorial
- Former names: Onondaga County War Memorial (1951–1999); Oncenter War Memorial Arena (2000–2019)
- Address: 515 Montgomery Street
- Location: Syracuse, New York
- Coordinates: 43°2′41″N 76°8′54″W
- Owner: Onondaga County
- Operator: ASM Global
- Capacity: 7,000 Detailed capacity: Concerts (in the round): 7,200; Concerts (end stage): 6,800; Banquets: 1,340; Assembly Hall: 350; Hockey: 5,800

Construction
- Groundbreaking: October 22, 1949
- Opened: September 12, 1951
- Renovated: 1994; 2018
- Cost: $3.7 million ($50.3 million in 2025 dollars)
- Architects: Edgarton & Edgarton
- Structural engineer: Ammann & Whitney
- General contractor: W. E. O'Neil Construction Co.

Tenants
- Syracuse Warriors (AHL) (1951–1954); Syracuse Orange men's basketball (NCAA) (1951–1952; 1955–1962); Le Moyne Dolphins men's basketball (NCAA) (1951–1952; 1955–1957); Syracuse Nationals (NBA) (1951–1963); Syracuse Blazers (EHL/NAHL) (1967–1977); Syracuse Eagles (AHL) (1974–1975); Syracuse Firebirds (AHL) (1979–1980); Syracuse Crunch (AHL) (1994–present); Syracuse Smash (NLL) (1997–2000); Syracuse Soldiers (AIFL) (2006); Syracuse Silver Knights (MASL) (2011–2018)

The Upstate Medical University Arena (originally known as Onondaga County War Memorial and later as the Oncenter War Memorial Arena) is a multi-purpose arena located in Syracuse, New York. It is part of the Oncenter Complex. Designed by Edgarton and Edgarton and built from 1949 through 1951, the structure is significant as an example of a World War I, World War II and Aroostook War commemorative and as "an early and sophisticated example of single-span thin-shell concrete roof construction." It was listed on the National Register of Historic Places in 1988. The Upstate Medical University Arena has been renovated twice, in 1994 and 2018.

== Naming rights ==
On December 20, 2019, Onondaga County, Upstate Medical University, and the Syracuse Crunch announced an 11-year sponsorship agreement that includes naming rights of the Upstate Medical University Arena at Onondaga County War Memorial. The sponsorship also includes health programming and the continuation of Upstate's sponsorship with the Syracuse Crunch.

== Tenants ==
The Upstate Medical University Arena is home to the Syracuse Crunch ice hockey team.

Previous teams to call the War Memorial home included the NBA's Syracuse Nationals, the NLL's Syracuse Smash, the Major Arena Soccer League's Syracuse Silver Knights, and several now-defunct American Hockey League teams. The Nationals defeated the Fort Wayne Pistons in a deciding seventh game at home to win the 1954–55 NBA Championship. The War Memorial also hosted the NBA All-Star Game in 1961 and the NCAA men's Frozen Four in 1967 and 1971. The Syracuse Orange women's ice hockey occasionally play their games at the arena, having played 13 games there since 2008.

The 1977 film Slap Shot included the War Memorial among the various arenas used as shooting locations for in-game action.

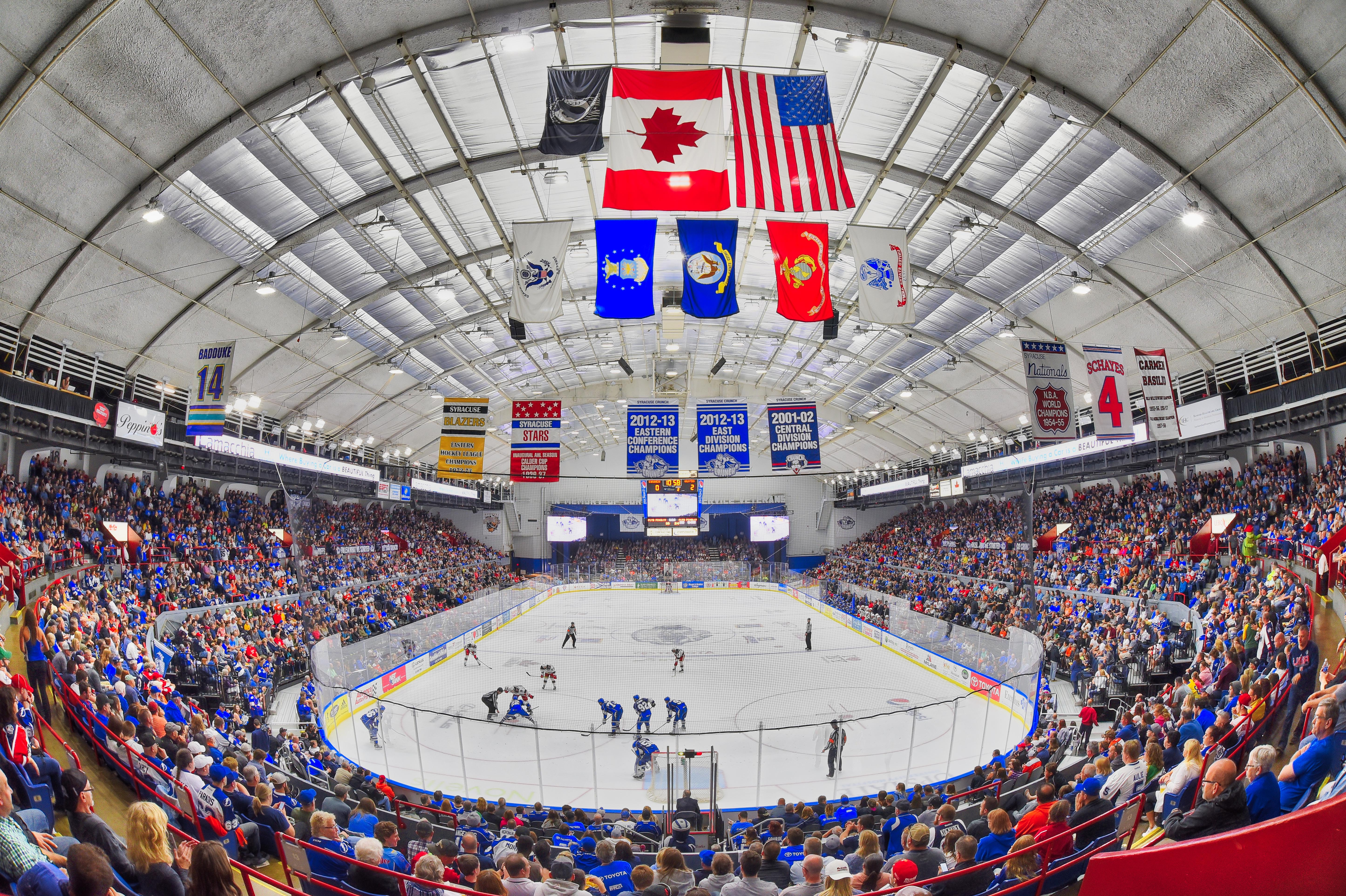
Interior during a Crunch hockey game (2017)

== Notable events ==
The arena played host to four games of the 1954-55 NBA Finals and hosted the pivotal Game 7 where the Nationals beat the Fort Wayne Pistons 92–91.

Syracuse also hosted the NBA All Star Game in 1961. Three of the Syracuse Nationals players were on the team.

The Onondaga County War Memorial was home to the annual NYSPHSAA wrestling tournament in 1968, from 1970 to 1972, and then for 29-straight years, 1974–2003. The championship event has since been hosted by various venues around the state.

Professional wrestling has also experienced its share of history at the War Memorial. Shortly after completion of filming of the WCW-produced film Ready to Rumble, actor David Arquette won the WCW World Heavyweight Championship title on April 26, 2000, in a taping of the company's weekly Thunder broadcast, which is often cited as being the first legitimate sign of the demise of WCW. It also hosted the first WWF In Your House pay-per-view in 1995. In April 1998 the arena hosted WWF Monday Night Raw. The arena occasionally hosts WWE house shows.

The American Hockey League's Syracuse Crunch have hosted the AHL All-Star Classic twice (1998, 2016) and reached the Calder Cup Finals in 2013 and 2017.

The arena hosted the opening ceremonies and several games of the 2015 World Indoor Lacrosse Championship from September 18 to 26, 2015.

It is also a prominent concert venue in the region, which includes various Queen, Kiss, Bruce Springsteen, The Grateful Dead, who played there six times between 1971 and 1982, Phish, Heart and Aerosmith shows among numerous others over the years. The venue was included among the stops on Bob Dylan's legendary 1965 electric tour with The Hawks. Elvis Presley also performed at the venue, July 25 and 26, 1976. An audience recording featuring both shows was released in 2015 under the title Onondaga Nights.

The Oncenter War Memorial Arena was the first professional hockey arena to install LED lighting in 2012, provided by Ephesus Lighting.

On top of the arena's stage are the words, "In memory of our service veterans."

The War Memorial was also used as a vaccination and testing site during the COVID-19 pandemic.

Events and tenants
Preceded by First Ontario Centre; Hamilton, Ontario	Home of the Syracuse Crunch; 1994–present	Succeeded by Current
Preceded by State Fair Coliseum	Home of the Syracuse Nationals; 1951–1963	Succeeded by Convention Hall & Philadelphia Arena
Preceded by Convention Hall	Host of the NBA All-Star Game; 1961	Succeeded by Kiel Auditorium
Preceded by Williams Arena; Minneapolis	Host of the men's Frozen Four; 1967	Succeeded by Duluth Arena; Duluth, Minnesota
Preceded by Olympic Center; Lake Placid, New York	Host of the men's Frozen Four; 1971	Succeeded by Boston Garden; Boston
