= Tom Marechek =

Canadian lacrosse player

Personal information
- Nationality: Canadian
- Born: August 25, 1968 (age 58) Victoria, British Columbia, Canada

Sport
- NLL draft: 6th overall, 1992; Buffalo Bandits
- NLL teams: Philadelphia Wings
- MLL teams: Washington Bayhawks
- Former NCAA team: Syracuse University
- Pro career: 1994–2007

Tom "Hollywood" Marechek (born August 25, 1968, in Victoria, British Columbia) is a Canadian former professional box lacrosse player.

== College career ==
Marechek played college lacrosse at Syracuse University where he teamed with Paul and Gary Gait to form one of the great college lacrosse squads in history, winning national title games in 1989 and 1990. Marechek is the fifth leading college goal scorer in lacrosse history with 182 goals, a four-time All-American, three-time first-team All-American pick, had 76 assists and 258 career points, scored 53 goals during his junior season to lead NCAA Division I, and set a Syracuse freshman record by scoring 46 goals on just 82 shots (56.1 per cent). He is well known for scoring shots behind his back. He was inducted into both the NCAA Hall of Fame and the US Lacrosse Hall of Fame in 2008.

== Professional career ==
=== NLL ===
He also played indoor lacrosse in the National Lacrosse League, where he played 12 seasons with the Philadelphia Wings. He retired from the NLL after the 2005 season. His number 42 was retired by the Wings and now hangs from the rafters at the Wells Fargo Center. Marechek was inducted into the National Lacrosse League Hall of Fame in 2007 and the Canadian Lacrosse Hall of Fame in 2012.

== Post-professional career ==
He formerly coached the Friends School of Baltimore's Men's Lacrosse team in Baltimore, Maryland and was the schools Physical Education Teacher. Tom founded and coaches for the Team 42 Lacrosse Club. He is also director of All Pro Lacrosse Club with camps held in Florida, Texas, Kansas, Pennsylvania and his flagship camp held at Notre Dame of Maryland University.

== Statistics ==
=== Syracuse University ===
Season	GP	G	A	Pts	PPG
1989	15	46	19	65	4.33
1990	13	36	26	62	4.77
1991	15	53	23	76	5.07
1992	15	47	8	55	3.67
Totals	58	182(a)	76	258	4.45

^{(a)} 10th in NCAA Men's Division I all-time Total Goals

=== NLL ===
		Regular Season						Playoffs
Season	Team	GP	G	A	Pts	LB	PIM	GP	G	A	Pts	LB	PIM
1994	Philadelphia	7	14	19	33	32	8	2	2	6	8	4	2
1995	Philadelphia	8	17	18	35	42	10	2	4	5	9	7	0
1996	Philadelphia	10	27	28	55	61	8	2	1	11	12	16	2
1997	Philadelphia	10	28	22	50	65	19	1	2	4	6	2	0
1998	Philadelphia	12	31	30	61	50	12	3	6	11	17	19	0
1999	Philadelphia	12	39	19	58	50	34	1	0	2	2	4	0
2000	Philadelphia	12	41	26	67	71	18	1	2	2	4	7	0
2001	Philadelphia	13	48	31	79	62	14	2	5	2	7	14	6
2002	Philadelphia	16	45	53	98	87	20	1	1	3	4	7	0
2003	Philadelphia	15	42	45	87	58	8	--	--	--	--	--	--
2004	Philadelphia	15	27	43	70	51	15	--	--	--	--	--	--
2005	Philadelphia	16	40	40	80	69	12	--	--	--	--	--	--
Totals		146	399	374	773	698	178	15	23	46	69	80	10

=== MLL ===
		Regular Season							Playoffs
Season	Team	GP	G	2ptG	A	Pts	LB	PIM	GP	G	2ptG	A	Pts	LB	PIM
2001	Baltimore	14	39	0	11	50	17	5	2	4	0	2	6	5	0
2002	Baltimore	14	29	0	11	40	20	4	2	3	0	2	5	6	0.5
2003	Baltimore	11	24	0	9	33	21	5	2	4	0	3	7	8	0
2004	Baltimore	11	26	0	11	37	20	2	1	1	0	0	1	0	1
2005	Baltimore	12	33	0	21	54	10	2	2	6	0	3	9	0	1
2006	Baltimore	7	17	2	6	25	10	0	-	-	-	-	-	-	-
2007	Washington	10	19	0	13	32	11	1	-	-	-	-	-	-	-
MLL Totals		79	187	2	82	271	109	19	9	18	0	10	28	19	2.5

== Awards ==
Preceded by Derek Keenan (1992)	NLL Rookie of the Year; 1994	Succeeded by Charlie Lockwood

== See also ==
- Syracuse Orange men's lacrosse
