= Kevin Finneran =

American lacrosse coach

Kevin Finneran is an American lacrosse coach and former player. In 2006, he was the head coach and general manager of Major League Lacrosse's Chicago Machine. Prior to becoming the team's first head coach Finneran had played in the MLL. He played with the Long Island Lizards from 2001 to 2004 and the Philadelphia Barrage in 2005.

Kevin also played box lacrosse in the National Lacrosse League (NLL). He spent 12 years and won four NLL Championships with the Philadelphia Wings before signing as a free agent with the Toronto Rock, where he played one season and won another championship.

Kevin played for Team USA in the Heritage Cup in both 2002 and 2004, and was named the captain of the 2004 team. He played his college ball at Ohio Wesleyan where he was a first Team All-American Midfield, was coached by Mike Pressler and played in the 1989 NCAA Division III Lacrosse Championship.

His brother Brian Finneran, a former director of catering at the "21" Club and Tavern on the Green, is a well known event producer in New York City.

Finneran served as the Director of Lacrosse of IMG Academy from May 2010 to February 2011.

Finneran attended Holy Trinity Diocesan High School on Long Island, where he led the lacrosse team to its first-ever winning season, as well as a Nassau-Suffolk Catholic League title, in 1982. He played college lacrosse at Ohio Wesleyan and Cornell.

Finneran was inducted into the Ohio Wesleyan Athletics Hall of Fame as a member of the class of 2018. In 2021, he was inducted into the NLL Hall of Fame.

== Statistics ==
=== NLL ===
		Regular Season						Playoffs
Season	Team	GP	G	A	Pts	LB	PIM	GP	G	A	Pts	LB	PIM
1991	New England	9	11	9	20	42	2	--	--	--	--	--	--
1992	Detroit	8	7	7	14	23	6	1	0	1	1	2	0
1993	Philadelphia	8	9	14	23	51	4	2	2	5	7	12	2
1994	Philadelphia	8	11	19	30	43	0	2	1	12	13	14	2
1995	Philadelphia	8	6	21	27	42	6	2	4	7	11	13	0
1996	Philadelphia	10	24	21	45	52	2	2	6	3	9	16	2
1997	Philadelphia	10	17	26	43	41	6	1	2	1	3	2	0
1998	Philadelphia	12	28	37	65	50	6	3	8	12	20	16	0
1999	Philadelphia	12	20	32	52	61	13	1	0	1	1	3	2
2000	Philadelphia	12	15	34	49	52	4	1	3	2	5	2	0
2001	Philadelphia	14	23	39	62	54	11	2	1	3	4	5	0
2002	Philadelphia	16	39	40	79	69	14	1	0	3	3	5	0
2003	Toronto	16	25	30	55	51	6	2	0	3	3	10	0
Totals		143	235	329	564	631	80	20	27	53	80	100	8

=== MLL ===
		Regular Season							Playoffs
Season	Team	GP	G	2ptG	A	Pts	LB	PIM	GP	G	2ptG	A	Pts	LB	PIM
2001	Long Island	12	8	0	3	11	12	0	2	1	0	1	2	2	0.5
2002	Long Island	14	24	2	10	36	39	1	2	4	0	2	6	0	0
2003	Long Island	10	8	0	5	13	17	2	2	0	0	0	0	4	2
2004	Long Island	12	16	0	8	24	19	0.5	0	0	0	0	0	0	0
2005	Philadelphia	3	0	0	0	0	4	0	0	0	0	0	0	0	0
MLL Totals		51	56	2	26	84	91	3.5	6	5	0	3	8	6	2.5
