= New York Saints =

Former NLL professional box lacrosse team

- Sport: Box lacrosse
- League: National Lacrosse League
- Division: American/Eastern
- Team history: New Jersey Saints (1987–1988)
- Location: Uniondale, New York
- Arena: Nassau Veterans Memorial Coliseum
- Colors: Blue, Maroon, Brown, White
- Championships: 0
- Division titles: 1992
- Formerly: New Jersey Saints

The New York Saints are a former member of the National Lacrosse League. They played at the Nassau Coliseum in Uniondale, New York, from 1989 to 2003. They became an inactive team after the 2002–03 season and were officially defunct in 2006.

The Saints had played in the Major Indoor Lacrosse League from 1987 to 1988 in New Jersey (at Brendan Byrne Arena) as the New Jersey Saints. The Saints won the 1988 MILL championship.

== Awards and honors ==
Year	Player	Award
1995	Charlie Lockwood	Rookie of the Year
2004	Chris Driscoll	Sportsmanship Award

== All-time record ==
Season	Division	W-L	Finish	Home	Road	GF	GA	Coach	Playoffs
1989		6–2	3rd	2–2	4–0	103	87	Bob Engelke	Lost Championship
1990		4–4	3rd	1–3	3–1	77	78	Bob Engelke	Lost in semifinals
1991	American	5–5	2nd	3–2	2–3	146	131	Bob Engelke	Missed playoffs
1992	American	5–3	1st	3–1	2–2	104	101	Bob Engelke	Lost in division finals
1993	American	5–3	2nd	3–1	2–2	88	89	William Dougherty	Lost in division finals
1994	American	2–6	2nd	2–2	0–4	81	102	William Dougherty	Lost in division finals
1995		2–6	6th	1–3	1–3	83	93	William Dougherty	Missed playoffs
1996		3-7	6th	2-3	1-4	125	144	Vinnie Pfeifer	Missed playoffs
1997		6–4	2nd	4–1	2–3	134	127	Vinnie Pfeifer	Lost in semifinals
1998		5–7	6th	3–3	2–4	167	165	Vinnie Pfeifer, Norm Engelke, John Phillips	Missed playoffs
1999		5–7	5th	2–4	3–3	149	156	Scott Huff	Missed playoffs
2000		3–9	7th	2–4	1–5	152	194	Scott Huff	Missed playoffs
2001		6–8	6th	3–4	3–4	179	181	Sal LoCascio	Missed playoffs
2002	Eastern	5–11	3rd	3–5	2–6	200	249	Sal LoCascio	Missed playoffs
2003	Eastern	3–13	3rd	3–5	0–8	198	239	Pat McCabe	Missed playoffs
Total	15 seasons	75–95		37–43	28–52	1,986	2,136	0 championships	

== Playoff results ==
Season	Game	Visiting	Home
1989	Semifinals	New York 9	Detroit 8 (2OT)
1989	Championships	New York 10	Philadelphia 11
1990	Semifinals	New York 8	Philadelphia 9
1992	Division Finals	Philadelphia 8	New York 6
1993	Division Semifinals	Baltimore 9	New York 10
1993	Division Finals	New York 9	Philadelphia 17
1994	Division Finals	New York 7	Philadelphia 17
1997	Semifinals	New York 10	Buffalo 19
