= 1997 NLL draft =

The 1997 NLL Draft composed of nine rounds where 72 lacrosse players were selected. The draft was completed on a conference call with all the teams coaches.

== 1st round ==
^{#} Denotes player who never played in the NLL regular season or playoffs

Pick #	NLL team	Player	Position	Club/college
1	Baltimore Thunder	Matt Shearer	F	Loyola College
2	Boston Blazers	Brenden Glass^{#}		University of Massachusetts
3	Ontario Raiders	Ken Millin	F	Six Nations Chiefs (MSL)
4	Syracuse Smash	Jim Rankin	G	Western Canada
5	New York Saints	Tom Wreggitt^{#}		Peterborough Lakers (MSL)
6	Philadelphia Wings	Rusty Kruger	F	Orangeville, Ontario
7	Buffalo Bandits	Casey Zaph	F	Peterborough Lakers (MSL)
8	Buffalo Bandits	Marty O'Brien	F	Whitby Warriors (OLL Jr. A)

== 2nd round ==
* Denotes player who has been selected for at least one All-Pro Team and had won at least one NLL Award
^{#} Denotes player who never played in the NLL regular season or playoffs

Pick #	NLL team	Player	Position	Club/college
9	Baltimore Thunder	Michael Watson^{#}	F	University of Virginia
10	Boston Blazers	Mike Tughan^{#}		Scarborough, Ontario
11	Ontario Raiders	Derek Malawsky	F	New Westminster Salmonbellies (WLA)
12	Syracuse Smash	John Wilson	F	Burnaby, British Columbia
13	New York Saints	Danen Reisig	D	Victoria Shamrocks (WLA)
14	Philadelphia Wings	Verigin Tutty^{#}		Vancouver, British Columbia
15	Buffalo Bandits	Bob Henry	F	Six Nations Chiefs (MSL)
16	Rochester Knighthawks	Josh Sanderson*	F	Orangeville Northmen (OLL Jr. A)

== 3rd round ==
^{x} Denotes player who won at least one NLL Award
^{#} Denotes player who never played in the NLL regular season or playoffs

Pick #	NLL team	Player	Position	Club/college
17	Baltimore Thunder	Andrew Ross	F	United States Naval Academy
18	Boston Blazers	Cam Woods^{x}	D	Brooklin Redmen (MSL)
19	Ontario Raiders	Chris Langdale	D	Ontario
20	Syracuse Smash	Jason Johnson^{#}		Six Nations Chiefs (MSL)
21	New York Saints	Jeff Gombar^{#}	G	North Shore Indians (WLA)
22	Philadelphia Wings	Brad Downey^{#}		Coquitlam Adanacs (WLA)
23	Buffalo Bandits	Gary Scott	F	Orangeville, Ontario
24	Rochester Knighthawks	Kevin Dance	F	Brampton Excelsiors (MSL)

== 4th round ==
^{#} Denotes player who never played in the NLL regular season or playoffs

Pick #	NLL team	Player	Position	Club/college
25	Baltimore Thunder	Billy Evans^{#}		Johns Hopkins University
26	Boston Blazers	Scott Ronson^{#}		Niagara Falls Gamblers (MSL)
27	Ontario Raiders	Glenn Clark	D	Brooklin Redmen (MSL)
28	Syracuse Smash	Brent Rothfuss	F	Nazareth College
29	New York Saints	John Gagliardi	F	Johns Hopkins University
30	Philadelphia Wings	Dave Stilley	D	Duke University
31	Buffalo Bandits	Clay Hill	D	Six Nations Chiefs (MSL)
32	Rochester Knighthawks	Bob Fisher	F	St. Catharines Athletics (MSL)

== 5th round ==
^{#} Denotes player who never played in the NLL regular season or playoffs

Pick #	NLL team	Player	Position	Club/college
33	Baltimore Thunder	Doug Knight	F	University of Virginia
34	Boston Blazers	Jason Fivek^{#}		Colgate University
35	Ontario Raiders	R. Phillips^{#}	G	Peterborough Lakers (MSL)
36	Syracuse Smash	Ryan Kells	F	Niagara Falls Gamblers (MSL)
37	New York Saints	Jason Osier^{#}		Princeton University
38	Philadelphia Wings	Jake Bergey	F	Salisbury State University
39	Buffalo Bandits	Sean Howe^{#}		St. Catharines Athletics (MSL)
40	Rochester Knighthawks	Pat Cougevan		Syracuse University

== 6th round ==
^{x} Denotes player who won at least one NLL Award
^{#} Denotes player who never played in the NLL regular season or playoffs

Pick #	NLL team	Player	Position	Club/college
41	Baltimore Thunder	Jason Wade^{#}		University of North Carolina
42	Boston Blazers	Paul Judge^{#}		Hofstra University
43	Ontario Raiders	Steve Toll^{x}	D	Niagara Falls Gamblers (MSL)
44	Syracuse Smash	Warren Blackwell	F	Victoria Shamrocks (WLA)
45	New York Saints	Jim Gonnella^{#}		Duke University
46	Philadelphia Wings	G. Atterbury^{#}		Washington College
47	Buffalo Bandits	Cort Knodel^{#}		Canisius College
48	Rochester Knighthawks	Dan Garrett^{#}	D	Nazareth College

== 7th round ==
^{#} Denotes player who never played in the NLL regular season or playoffs

Pick #	NLL team	Player	Position	Club/college
49	Baltimore Thunder	David Curry^{#}		University of Virginia
50	Boston Blazers	B. Proefrock^{#}		Rensselaer Polytechnic Institute
51	Ontario Raiders	Pat Jones	D	Whitby Warriors (OLL Jr. A)
52	Syracuse Smash	Tony Henderson	F	Niagara Falls Gamblers (MSL)
53	New York Saints	Chris Grande^{#}		University of Massachusetts
54	Philadelphia Wings	Jude Collins	F	University of North Carolina
55	Buffalo Bandits	Chris Clark	F	Michigan State University
56	Rochester Knighthawks	Phil Sanderson	D	Orangeville Northmen (OLL Jr. A)

== 8th round ==
^{#} Denotes player who never played in the NLL regular season or playoffs

Pick #	NLL team	Player	Position	Club/college
57	Baltimore Thunder	M. Marchant^{#}		Mount Washington College
58	Boston Blazers	Steve Rogie^{#}		Michigan State University
59	Ontario Raiders	Kris Bryde	F	Coquitlam Adanacs (WLA)
60	Syracuse Smash	Jim Roberts^{#}		Brooklin Redmen (MSL)
61	New York Saints	Craig Kahoun^{#}		Butler University
62	Philadelphia Wings	Werner Krueger	F	Johns Hopkins University
63	Buffalo Bandits	Chris Levis	G	Six Nations Chiefs (MSL)
64	Rochester Knighthawks	Rory Thorpe^{#}		Syracuse University

== 9th round ==
^{#} Denotes player who never played in the NLL regular season or playoffs

Pick #	NLL team	Player	Position	Club/college
65	Baltimore Thunder	Brian Volpe^{#}		Loyola College
66	Boston Blazers	Alex Nephew^{#}		Denison University
67	Ontario Raiders	Chad Squire	F	Six Nations Chiefs (MSL)
68	Syracuse Smash	Bill Genie^{#}		Six Nations Chiefs (MSL)
69	New York Saints	Brian Kuczma^{#}		Johns Hopkins University
70	Philadelphia Wings	Tim Lucky^{#}		Mount Washington College
71	Buffalo Bandits	Jeff Hanson	F	Burnaby Lakers (MSL)
72	Rochester Knighthawks	Matt Kerwick	F	Hobart and William Smith Colleges

Preceded by 1996 NLL Draft	National Lacrosse League Entry Draft; 1997	Succeeded by 1998 NLL Draft
