= Pat McCready =

Canadian former lacrosse player (born 1974)

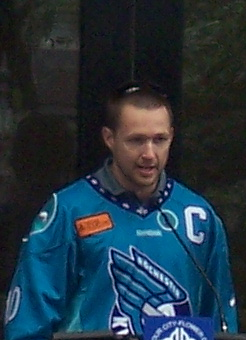
- McCready with the Rochester Knighthawks in 2012

Personal information
- Nickname: Speedy
- Born: October 18, 1974 (age 51) St. Catharines, Ontario, Canada
- Height: 6 ft 1 in (185 cm)
- Weight: 190 lb (86 kg; 13 st 8 lb)

Sport
- Position: Forward
- Shoots: Right
- NLL teams: Rochester Knighthawks; Toronto Rock; Buffalo Bandits; Charlotte Cobras
- MSL team: Peterborough Lakers
- Pro career: 1996–2012

Pat McCready (born October 18, 1974, in St. Catharines, Ontario) is a Canadian former box lacrosse player who played most of his National Lacrosse League career for Rochester Knighthawks, Buffalo Bandits, Toronto Rock, and Charlotte Cobras. As of 2013, he ranks third in NLL history in loose balls (1,593), second in penalty minutes (468), and seventh in games played (219).

== NLL career ==
McCready made his professional lacrosse debut in 1996 with the Charlotte Cobras. In 1997, he joined the Rochester Knighthawks where he played until he was traded to the Buffalo Bandits in a blockbuster deal that exchanged seven players between the two teams before the 2002 season. In 2007, McCready made his National Lacrosse League All-Star Game debut.

On August 5, 2009, McCready was traded from the Buffalo Bandits along with a third-round draft pick in 2009 to the Toronto Rock in exchange for a second-round draft pick in the 2009 entry draft, first-round pick in 2010, and a second-round pick in 2011.

On December 18, 2010, McCready signed a one-year deal with the Rochester Knighthawks. He played the 2011 and 2012 seasons as a teammate of his nephew, Joel McCready, winning a championship in 2012. McCready retired before the 2013 season.

== Canadian Box career ==
=== Junior ===
McCready played five years with the St. Catharines Athletics of the OLA Junior A Lacrosse League. During his rookie season with the Niagara Spartan Warriors, he was called up to play with the Athletics. McCready played with the team the entire playoffs and helped the team to their second league championship in a row. In 1995, McCready was named the league's "Best Defensive Player".

=== Senior ===
McCready won the Mann Cup with the Brampton Excelsiors in 1998. He also won the Presidents Cup in 2003 with the Kitchener-Waterloo Kodiaks. He currently plays for the Peterborough Lakers of Major League Lacrosse.

== Family ==
Pat's nephew, Joel McCready, currently plays for the Rochester Knighthawks. Pat's late father, Bob "Buff" McCready, who was the Bandits' first head coach in 1992, was inducted into the Canadian Lacrosse Hall of Fame in 1997.

== Statistics ==
=== NLL ===
Pat McCready		Regular season									Playoffs								
Season	Team	GP	G	A	Pts	LB	PIM	Pts/GP	LB/GP	PIM/GP	GP	G	A	Pts	LB	PIM	Pts/GP	LB/GP	PIM/GP
1996	Charlotte Cobras	10	14	11	25	71	20	2.50	7.10	2.00	–	–	–	–	–	–	–	–	–
1997	Rochester Knighthawks	10	4	15	19	48	8	1.90	4.80	0.80	2	0	1	1	5	7	0.50	2.50	3.50
1998	Rochester Knighthawks	9	8	14	22	46	37	2.44	5.11	4.11	1	0	3	3	7	2	3.00	7.00	2.00
1999	Rochester Knighthawks	10	7	16	23	46	8	2.30	4.60	0.80	2	0	0	0	4	2	0.00	2.00	1.00
2000	Rochester Knighthawks	9	13	10	23	43	10	2.56	4.78	1.11	2	0	0	0	11	2	0.00	5.50	1.00
2001	Rochester Knighthawks	13	10	11	21	70	52	1.62	5.38	4.00	1	0	0	0	2	0	0.00	2.00	0.00
2002	Buffalo Bandits	16	16	24	40	173	13	2.50	10.81	0.81	–	–	–	–	–	–	–	–	–
2003	Buffalo Bandits	15	14	15	29	118	29	1.93	7.87	1.93	2	1	3	4	13	2	2.00	6.50	1.00
2004	Buffalo Bandits	16	6	20	26	166	36	1.63	10.38	2.25	3	2	2	4	24	0	1.33	8.00	0.00
2005	Buffalo Bandits	13	7	16	23	77	44	1.77	5.92	3.38	1	1	2	3	9	2	3.00	9.00	2.00
2006	Buffalo Bandits	15	11	15	26	154	36	1.73	10.27	2.40	3	1	3	4	27	0	1.33	9.00	0.00
2007	Buffalo Bandits	13	5	18	23	126	25	1.77	9.69	1.92	2	1	1	2	11	2	1.00	5.50	1.00
2008	Buffalo Bandits	15	8	15	23	121	44	1.53	8.07	2.93	3	0	8	8	23	19	2.67	7.67	6.33
2009	Buffalo Bandits	9	4	12	16	55	24	1.78	6.11	2.67	2	0	2	2	16	6	1.00	8.00	3.00
2010	Toronto Rock	15	3	6	9	84	28	0.60	5.60	1.87	3	0	4	4	17	0	1.33	5.67	0.00
2011	Rochester Knighthawks	15	6	12	18	101	18	1.20	6.73	1.20	1	0	0	0	9	0	0.00	9.00	0.00
2012	Rochester Knighthawks	16	5	13	18	94	38	1.13	5.88	2.38	3	1	1	2	20	7	0.67	6.67	2.33
		219	141	243	384	1,593	470	1.75	7.27	2.15	31	7	30	37	198	51	1.19	6.39	1.65
Career Total:		250	148	273	421	1,791	521	1.68	7.16	2.08									

GP–Games played; G–Goals; A–Assists; Pts–Points; LB–Loose balls; PIM–Penalty minutes; Pts/GP–Points per games played; LB/GP–Loose balls per games played; PIM/GP–Penalty minutes per games played.

=== Canadian Lacrosse Association ===
			Regular Season					Playoffs
Season	Team	League	GP	G	A	Pts	PIM	GP	G	A	Pts	PIM
1991	Niagara Spartan Warriors	OLA Jr.B	18	10	9	19	39	--	--	--	--	--
1991	St. Catharines Athletics	OLA Jr.A	6	1	0	1	20	8	2	2	4	2
1992	St. Catharines Athletics	OLA Jr.A	20	3	8	11	32	14	1	1	2	25
1993	St. Catharines Athletics	OLA Jr.A	21	3	8	11	53	16	6	2	8	46
1994	St. Catharines Athletics	OLA Jr.A	24	17	33	50	69	13	3	17	20	41
1995	St. Catharines Athletics	OLA.Jr.A	20	14	35	49	36	13	7	17	24	12
1996	North Shore Indians	WLA	20	18	22	40	17	11	4	9	13	9
1997	North Shore Indians	WLA	8	1	12	13	37	11	2	5	7	33
1998	Brampton Excelsiors	MSL	11	15	15	30	4	5	2	3	5	13
Mann Cup	Brampton Excelsiors	CLA	--	--	--	--	--	3	2	5	7	26
1999	Six Nations Chiefs	MSL	3	4	6	10	0	--	--	--	--	--
1999	Peterborough Lakers	MSL	3	4	2	6	0	7	10	6	16	9
2000	Peterborough Lakers	MSL	9	12	17	29	19	3	3	3	6	0
2001	St. Catharines Athletics	MSL	13	18	17	35	17	4	6	12	18	2
2002	St. Catharines Athletics	MSL	4	6	7	13	23	--	--	--	--	--
2002	Brooklin Redmen	MSL	4	6	8	14	0	8	6	8	14	22
2003	St. Catharines Athletics	MSL	4	3	6	9	10	3	3	3	6	7
2003	Kitchener-Waterloo Kodiaks	OLA Sr. B	2	3	0	3	0	6	8	4	12	6
2004	St. Catharines Athletics	MSL	9	4	9	13	12	2	1	0	1	2
2004	Kitchener-Waterloo Kodiaks	OLA Sr. B	0	0	0	0	0	3	6	5	11	10
2005	Brampton Excelsiors	MSL	10	15	19	34	46	12	7	14	21	32
2006	Brampton Excelsiors	MSL	5	4	7	11	6	11	6	8	14	26
2007	Brampton Excelsiors	MSL	7	5	7	12	2	11	4	10	14	22
2008	Brampton Excelsiors	MSL	2	1	1	2	2	9	8	13	21	4
2009	St. Regis Indians	MSL	11	10	16	26	6	9	5	13	18	12
Junior A Totals			91	38	84	122	210	64	19	39	58	126
Junior B Totals			18	10	9	19	39	0	0	0	0	0
Senior A Totals			123	126	149	275	201	106	67	107	174	193
Senior B Totals			2	3	0	3	0	9	14	9	23	16
Mann Cup Totals			--	--	--	--	--	3	2	5	7	26

Preceded by Sandy Chapman	NLL Defensive Player of the Year; 2011	Succeeded by Kyle Rubisch
