= National Lacrosse League entry draft =

Annual professional box lacrosse sports draft

The National Lacrosse League entry draft is an annual event where the general managers of National Lacrosse League (NLL) teams choose eligible players for their rosters from US college programs and Canada's junior lacrosse system.

A player is deemed eligible for the draft if he is 21 years of age, or is less than 21 years of age and has used or given up all NCAA or NAIA eligibility.

== NLL 1st round draft selections ==
=== 2025 NLL ===
The 2025 entry draft took place on September 6, 2025. 89 players were selected in 6 rounds.

# Overall	Team	Player	Position	Club/college	Notes
1	Toronto Rock	CJ Kirst	F	Mimico Mountaineers Jr. A - Cornell University	Traded from Las Vegas Desert Dogs
2	Toronto Rock	Ty English	F/T	Oakville Rock - University of North Carolina	
3	Toronto Rock	Owen Hiltz	F	Peterborough Lakers (MSL) - Syracuse University	Traded from Philadelphia Wings
4	Las Vegas Desert Dogs	Casey Wilson	T/D	Victoria Shamrocks WLA - University of Denver	Traded from Albany FireWolves
5	Colorado Mammoth	Braedon Saris	F	Peterborough Lakers (MSL) - Princeton University	
6	Halifax Thunderbirds	Alex Marinier	F	Cobourg Kodiaks MSL - Ohio State University	Traded from Ottawa Black Bears
7	Georgia Swarm	Ben Trumble	D	Peterborough Lakers (MSL) - Colgate University	Traded from San Diego Seals
8	Georgia Swarm	Nolan Byrne	F	Whitby Warriors Jr. A - Lafayette College	
9	Calgary Roughnecks	Noah Manning	F	Nanaimo Timbermen WLA - University of Denver	
10	Rochester Knighthawks	Connor Nock	D	Owen Sound North Stars MSL - Quincy University	
11	Calgary Roughnecks	Kyle Pepper	T	Victoria Shamrocks WLA - St. Bonaventure University	Traded from Vancouver Warriors
12	Halifax Thunderbirds	Will MacLeod	F	Brooklin Lacrosse Club MSL - Robert Morris University	
13	Saskatchewan Rush	Levi Verch	D	Nanaimo Timbermen WLA - Saint Joseph's University	
14	Buffalo Bandits	Waukiigan Shognosh	G	Peterborough Lakers Jr. A	
15	Philadelphia Wings	Bo Columbus	D	Brooklin Lacrosse Club MSL - Robert Morris University	Compensatory selection
16	Georgia Swarm	Jeremi Phoenix-Lefebvre	T	Cobourg Kodiaks MSL - Mercyhurst University	Compensatory selection. Traded from Halifax Thunderbirds
17	Las Vegas Desert Dogs	Caleb Khan	G	Langley Thunder WLA	Compensatory selection
18	San Diego Seals	Ari Steenhuis	T	St. Catharines Athletics Jr. A	Compensatory selection. Traded from Calgary Roughnecks

=== 2024 NLL ===
The 2024 entry draft took place on September 15, 2024 at the Toronto Rock Athletic Centre in Toronto. 86 players were selected in 6 rounds.

# Overall	Team	Player	Position	Club/college	Notes
1	Philadelphia Wings	Brennan O'Neill	F	Duke University	
2	Toronto Rock	Sam English	F	Oakville Rock - Syracuse University	
3	Georgia Swarm	Michael Grace	D	Brooklin Lacrosse Club - RIT/Syracuse University	
4	Vancouver Warriors	Johnathan Peshko	F	Owen Sound North Stars - Johns Hopkins University	
5	Calgary Roughnecks	Brayden Mayea	F	High Point University	
6	Vancouver Warriors	Remo Schenato	D	Coquitlam Adanacs Jr. A	Traded from Saskatchewan Rush
7	Buffalo Bandits	Lukas Nielsen	F	New Westminster Salmonbellies Jr. A	
8	Buffalo Bandits	Luca Antongiovanni	D/T	Coquitlam Adanacs - University of North Carolina	
9	San Diego Seals	Trent DiCicco	D	Victoria Shamrocks - Ohio State University	Traded from Georgia Swarm
10	Calgary Roughnecks	Jack Follows	D	Oakville Rock - Cornell University	
11	Georgia Swarm	Alex Bean	D	Loyola University	
12	San Diego Seals	Jacob Power	T	Nanaimo Timbermen - Belmont Abbey	
13	Toronto Rock	Jake Darlison	T	Whitby Warriors Jr. A	
14	San Diego Seals	Robbie Turpin	D	Coquitlam Adanacs Jr. A - Simon Fraser University	
15	Buffalo Bandits	Taylor Dooley	D	Toronto Beaches Jr. A - Mercer University	
16	Saskatchewan Rush	Matt Acchione	T	Snake Island Muskies - University of Delaware	

=== 2023 NLL ===
The 2023 entry draft took place on September 15, 2023 at the Toronto Rock Athletic Centre in Toronto. 97 players were selected in 6 rounds.

# Overall	Team	Player	Position	Club/college	Notes
1	Albany FireWolves	Dyson Williams	F	Brooklin Lacrosse Club - Duke University	
2	Las Vegas Desert Dogs	Adam Poitras	F/T	Whitby Warriors - Loyola University	Traded from Vancouver Warriors
3	New York Riptide	Callum Jones	D	Oakville - Norwich University	
4	Vancouver Warriors	Payton Cormier	F	Brooklin Lacrosse Club - University of Virginia	Traded from Las Vegas Desert Dogs
5	Panther City LC	Ryan Sheridan	F	Nanaimo Timbermen - Hofstra University	Traded from Saskatchewan Rush
6	Georgia Swarm	Toron Eccleston	F	Burnaby Lakers - Lenoir-Rhyne University	
7	Vancouver Warriors	Brock Haley	F	Whitby Warriors - University of Vermont	Traded from Philadelphia Wings
8	Georgia Swarm	Jacob Hickey	F	Toronto Beaches	Traded from Panther City LC
9	Vancouver Warriors	Brayden Laity	D	Port Coquitlam Saints Jr. A/Langley Thunder WLA	Traded from Rochester Knighthawks via Las Vegas Desert Dogs
10	New York Riptide	Jake Stevens	T	Brooklin Lacrosse Club - Princeton University/Syracuse University	
11	Calgary Roughnecks	Bennett Smith	T	Victoria Shamrocks - Queen's University	
12	Saskatchewan Rush	Levi Anderson	F	Miner's LC Sr. B - Saint Joseph's University	Traded from Toronto Rock
13	San Diego Seals	Matthew Wright	T	Peterborough Lakers - University of North Carolina/Syracuse University	
14	Albany FireWolves	Nicholas Volkov	T	Burlington Blaze	Traded from Colorado Mammoth
15	Rochester Knighthawks	Graydon Hogg	F/T	Whitby Warriors - University of Albany	
16	Rochester Knighthawks	Ben MacDonnell	D	Brooklin Lacrosse Club - Robert Morris University	
17	Albany FireWolves	Zachary Young	D	Brooklin Lacrosse Club - University of North Carolina	Compensatory selection
18	Vancouver Warriors	Connor O'Toole	G	Brampton Excelsiors - Brock University	
19	Georgia Swarm	Kaleb Benedict	F	Orangeville Northmen	Compensatory selection

=== 2022 NLL ===
The 2022 entry draft took place on September 10, 2022, at The Carlu in Toronto. 104 players were selected in 6 rounds.

# Overall	Team	Player	Position	Club/college	Notes
1	Rochester Knighthawks	Thomas McConvey	F	Mimico Mountaineers - University of Vermont/University of Virginia	Traded from Las Vegas Desert Dogs
2	Las Vegas Desert Dogs	Dylan Watson	F	Orangeville Northmen - Georgetown University/Jacksonville University	Traded from Rochester Knighthawks
3	Vancouver Warriors	Owen Grant	D	Toronto Beaches – University of Delaware	
4	Albany FireWolves	Alex Simmons	F	St Catharines – University of Denver/Syracuse University	Traded from New York Riptide
5	Panther City LC	Jason Knox	F	Burlington Chiefs – Hobart College/Ohio State University	
6	Saskatchewan Rush	Austin Madronic	F	Victoria Shamrocks – Harvard University	
7	Albany FireWolves	Will Johansen	F	Nanaimo Timbermen – Robert Morris University	Traded from Georgia Swarm
8	New York Riptide	Zack Deaken	T	Brooklin Lacrosse Club – Jacksonville University	Traded from Philadelphia Wings via Albany Firewolves
9	Panther City LC	Mathieu Gautier	F	Edmonton Miners	Traded from Albany Firewolves via Halifax Thunderbirds
10	Calgary Roughnecks	Seth Van Schepen	F	Brampton Excelsior – Siena College	
11	Georgia Swarm	Brett Dobson	G	Whitby Warriors – St. Bonaventure University	Traded from San Diego Seals
12	Halifax Thunderbirds	WakeRiat Bowhunter	F	Six Nations Chiefs – Jacksonville University	
13	Buffalo Bandits	Cam Wyers	D	Toronto Beaches – Loyola University	Traded from Toronto Rock
14	Buffalo Bandits	Dylan Robinson	D	Toronto Beaches	
15	Colorado Mammoth	Owen Down	D	Cobourg Kodiaks – Robert Morris University	
16	Las Vegas Desert Dogs	Jacob Saunders	D	Brooklin Lacrosse Club – University of Richmond	Compensatory selection
17	Albany FireWolves	Tye Kurtz	F	Cobourg Kodiaks – University of Delaware	Compensatory selection
18	Rochester Knighthawks	Austin Hasen	F	Peterborough Lakers – Belmont Abbey College	Traded from Calgary Roughnecks via Las Vegas Desert Dogs (compensatory selection)
19	Buffalo Bandits	Zach Belter	D	Niagara Thunderhawks – St. Bonaventure University	Compensatory selection
20	Georgia Swarm	Brady Kearnan	F	Brooklin Lacrosse Club – Mercy College	Compensatory selection
21	Panther City LC	Colton Lidstone	F	Nanaimo Timbermen – Robert Morris University	Traded from Albany Firewolves
22	San Diego Seals	Jake Govett	F	San Diego Royals – University of Delaware	Compensatory selection
23	Philadelphia Wings	Taggart Clark	F	Toronto Beaches – Robert Morris University	Traded from Saskatchewan Rush (compensatory selection)

=== 2021 NLL ===
The 2021 entry draft took place on August 28, 2021, virtually with 6 rounds and 90 players selected.

# Overall	Team	Player	Position	Club/college	Notes
1	Panther City LC	Jonathan Donville	RF	Cornell University	
2	Georgia Swarm	Ryan Lanchbury	RF	University of Richmond	Traded from New York Riptide
3	Buffalo Bandits	Tehoka Nanticoke	RF	Six Nations/University of Albany	Traded from Rochester Knighthawks
4	Vancouver Warriors	Adam Charalambides	LF	Rutgers University	
5	San Diego Seals	Mike McCannell	LT	Stony Brook University	
6	Calgary Roughnecks	Kyle Waters	RF	Detroit Mercy College	
7	Saskatchewan Rush	Jake Boudreau	LT	Robert Morris University	Traded from Colorado Mammoth
8	Saskatchewan Rush	Ryan Barnable	LD	RIT	Traded from Philadelphia Wings
9	San Diego Seals	Patrick Shoemay	RD	RIT	Traded from Florida Launch
10	Calgary Roughnecks	Justin Inacio	RT	Ohio State University	Traded from Buffalo Bandits via Philadelphia Wings
11	Panther City LC	Nathan Grenon	LF	Mercyhurst University	Traded from Toronto Rock via Georgia Swarm
12	Halifax Thunderbirds	Max Wilson	RD	NJIT	
13	San Diego Seals	Jacob Dunbar	RF	Port Coquitlam Jr. Saints	Traded from Saskatchewan Rush via Buffalo Bandits
14	Buffalo Bandits	Thomas Vaesen	LF	University of Montevallo	Traded from Albany FireWolves
15	Philadelphia Wings	Hunter Lemeuix	LF	Roberts Wesleyan College	Traded from Calgary Roughnecks via Panther City LC
16	Albany FireWolves	Patrick Kaschalk	LD	Stony Brook University	Compensatory selection

=== 2020 NLL ===
The 2020 entry draft took place on September 17, 2020, virtually with 6 rounds and 93 players selected.

# Overall	Team	Player	Position	Club/college	Notes
1	New York Riptide	Jeff Teat	F	Cornell University	
2	Vancouver Warriors	Reid Bowering	D	Drexel University	Traded from Rochester Knighthawks
3	Rochester Knighthawks	Ryan Smith	F	Robert Morris University	Traded from Vancouver Warriors
4	San Diego Seals	Tre Leclaire	F	Ohio State University	
5	Calgary Roughnecks	Tanner Cook	F	University of North Carolina	
6	Georgia Swarm	Robert Hudson	T	University of Vermont	Traded from Colorado Mammoth
7	Saskatchewan Rush	Marshall Powless	F	Six Nations	Traded from Philadelphia Wings
8	Georgia Swarm	Jeff Henrick	D	Ohio State University	
9	Buffalo Bandits	Brad McCulley	F	Robert Morris University	
10	Georgia Swarm	Ethan Walker	F	University of Denver	Traded from Toronto Rock
11	Halifax Thunderbirds	Ethan Riggs	D	Burlington Chiefs	
12	Saskatchewan Rush	Connor McClelland	D	Marquette University	
13	Georgia Swarm	Laine Hruska	D	Saskatchewan SWAT	Traded from New England Black Wolves
14	Calgary Roughnecks	Harrison Matsuoka	T	Stony Brook University	Traded from Halifax Thunderbirds
15	San Diego Seals	Mac O'Keefe	F	Penn State	
16	Philadelphia Wings	Jackson Suboch	D	University of Massachusetts	

=== 2019 NLL ===
The 2019 entry draft took place on September 17, 2019, at Xfinity Live! in Philadelphia, Pennsylvania.

# Overall	Team	Player	Club/college
1	New York Riptide	Tyson Gibson	Robert Morris University
2	Rochester Knighthawks	Ryland Rees	Stony Brook University
3	New England Black Wolves	Andrew Kew	University of Tampa
4	Saskatchewan Rush	Holden Garlent	Canisius College
5	Halifax Thunderbirds	Clarke Petterson	Cornell University
6	Colorado Mammoth	Warren Jeffrey	University of Vermont
7	Calgary Roughnecks	Liam LeClair	Six Nations Jr. A
8	Calgary Roughnecks	Haiden Dickson	Coquitlam Adanacs
9	Saskatchewan Rush	Justin Robinson	Robert Morris University
10	New York Riptide	Tyson Bomberry	Syracuse University
11	Georgia Swarm	Kason Tarbell	Cornell University
12	Buffalo Bandits	Brent Noseworthy	University of Michigan
13	Georgia Swarm	Ryan MacSpadyen	Mercy College
14	Halifax Thunderbirds	Trevor Smyth	Rochester Institute of Technology
15	Toronto Rock	Aaron Forster	New Jersey Institute of Technology
16	Saskatchewan Rush	Tanner Thomson	Marquette University
17	New England Black Wolves	Zach Goodrich	Towson University

=== 2018 NLL ===
The 2018 entry draft took place on September 25, 2018, at Xfinity Live! in Philadelphia, Pennsylvania.

# Overall	Team	Player	Club/college
1	San Diego Seals	Austin Staats	Onondaga Community College
2	Philadelphia Wings	Chris Cloutier	University of North Carolina
3	Buffalo Bandits	Matt Gilray	Bucknell University
4	Buffalo Bandits	Ian MacKay	University of Vermont
5	Saskatchewan Rush	Connor Robinson	High Point University
6	Calgary Roughnecks	Shane Simpson	University of North Carolina
7	Georgia Swarm	Brendan Bomberry	Syracuse University
8	Georgia Swarm	Adam Wiedemann	Belmont Abbey College
9	Rochester Knighthawks	James Barclay	Providence College
10	San Diego Seals	Connor Fields	University of Albany
11	San Diego Seals	Connor Kearnan	Canisius College
12	Calgary Roughnecks	Eli Salama	Rochester Institute of Technology
13	Calgary Roughnecks	Reece Callies	Colorado Mesa University

=== 2017 NLL ===
The 2017 entry draft took place on September 18, 2017, at the Toronto Rock Athletic Centre in Oakville, Ontario.

# Overall	Team	Player	Club/college
1	Buffalo Bandits	Josh Byrne	Burnaby Lakers / Hofstra University
2	Rochester Knighthawks	Jake Withers	Atlanta Blaze
3	Calgary Roughnecks	Zach Currier	Peterborough Lakers
4	Georgia Swarm	Zed Williams	Rochester Rattlers
5	Rochester Knighthawks	Austin Shanks	Brooklin Redmen
6	Rochester Knighthawks	Eric Fannell	Oakville Rock
7	New England Black Wolves	Colton Watkinson	Brooklin Redmen
8	New England Black Wolves	Anthony Joaquim	Brampton Excelsiors
9	Calgary Roughnecks	Tyler Pace	Langley Thunder / University of Denver
10	New England Black Wolves	JP Kealey	Langley Thunder
11	Calgary Roughnecks	Ryan Martel	Langley Thunder

=== 2016 NLL ===
The 2016 entry draft took place on September 26, 2016, at the Toronto Rock Athletic Centre in Toronto.

# Overall	Team	Player	Club/college
1	Saskatchewan Rush	Ryan Keenan	Quinnipiac University
2	Toronto Rock	Challen Rogers	Stony Brook University
3	Saskatchewan Rush	Michael Messenger	Limestone College
4	Georgia Swarm	Bryan Cole	University of Maryland
5	Calgary Roughnecks	Holden Cattoni	Johns Hopkins University
6	Rochester Knighthawks	Josh Currier	Virginia Wesleyan College
7	Rochester Knighthawks	Kyle Jackson	University of Michigan
8	New England Black Wolves	Seth Oakes	University of Albany
9	Colorado Mammoth	Zach Herreweyers	Loyola University Maryland
10	Georgia Swarm	Connor Sellars	Belmont Abbey College

=== 2015 NLL ===
The 2015 entry draft took place on September 28, 2015, at the Toronto Rock Athletic Centre in Toronto.

# Overall	Team	Player	Club/college
1	Georgia Swarm	Lyle Thompson	Albany
2	Rochester Knighthawks	Graeme Hossack	Lindenwood
3	Georgia Swarm	Jesse King	Ohio State
4	Calgary Roughnecks	Wesley Berg	Denver
5	Georgia Swarm	Chad Tutton	North Carolina
6	Georgia Swarm	Randy Staats	Syracuse
7	Calgary Roughnecks	Reilly O'Connor	Georgetown
8	New England Black Wolves	Dan Lintner	Cornell
9	Rochester Knighthawks	Brad Gillies	RIT

=== 2014 NLL ===
The 2014 entry draft took place on September 16, 2014, at the Toronto Rock Athletic Centre in Oakville.

# Overall	Team	Player	Club/college
1	Edmonton Rush	Ben McIntosh	Drexel Dragons
2	Rochester Knighthawks	Jeremy Noble	University of Denver
3	Minnesota Swarm	Miles Thompson	University at Albany
4	Colorado Mammoth	Eli McLaughlin	Coquitlam, British Columbia
5	Minnesota Swarm	Shane MacDonald	Brampton, Ontario
6	New England Black Wolves	Mark Cockerton	University of Virginia
7	Colorado Mammoth	Robert Hope	Pfeiffer University
8	New England Black Wolves	Quinn Powless	Six Nations, Ontario
9	Buffalo Bandits	Brandon Goodwin	Adelphi University

=== 2013 NLL ===
The 2013 entry draft took place on September 16, 2013, at the Toronto Rock Athletic Centre in Oakville.

# Overall	Team	Player	Club/college
1	Minnesota Swarm	Logan Schuss	Ohio State University
2	Minnesota Swarm	Jason Noble	Cornell University
3	Colorado Mammoth	Dillon Ward	Bellarmine University
4	Minnesota Swarm	Cameron Flint	University of Denver
5	Edmonton Rush	Robert Church	Drexel University
6	Calgary Roughnecks	Tor Reinholdt	Limestone College
7	Minnesota Swarm	Scott Jones	UMBC
8	Vancouver Stealth	Cody Bremner	Cornell University
9	Toronto Rock	Ethan O'Connor	Hobart College

=== 2012 NLL ===
The 2012 entry draft took place on October 1, 2012.

# Overall	Team	Player	Club/college
1	Edmonton Rush	Mark Matthews	University of Denver
2	Minnesota Swarm	Brock Sorenson	Ohio State University
3	Minnesota Swarm	Kiel Matisz	Robert Morris University
4	Minnesota Swarm	Shayne Jackson	Limestone College
5	Buffalo Bandits	Dhane Smith	Kitchener, Ontario
6	Calgary Roughnecks	Joe Resetarits	Brampton, Ontario
7	Calgary Roughnecks	Matthew Dinsdale	Coquitlam, BC
8	Edmonton Rush	Curtis Knight	Whitby, Ontario
9	Colorado Mammoth	Colton Clark	Bellarmine University
10	Minnesota Swarm	Alex Crepinsek	RIT

=== 2011 NLL ===
The 2011 entry draft took place on September 21, 2011.

# Overall	Team	Player	Club/college
1	Philadelphia Wings	Kevin Crowley	Stony Brook University
2	Rochester Knighthawks	Stephen Keogh	Syracuse University
3	Colorado Mammoth	Adam Jones	Canisius College
4	Minnesota Swarm	Jordan MacIntosh	Rochester Institute of Technology
5	Rochester Knighthawks	Johnny Powless	Six Nations, Ontario
6	Minnesota Swarm	Evan Kirk	Hobart College
7	Calgary Roughnecks	Travis Cornwall	Coquitlam, British Columbia
8	Colorado Mammoth	Dan Coates	Canisius College

=== 2010 NLL ===
The 2010 entry draft took place on September 8, 2010, at the Westin Harbour Castle Hotel in Toronto.

# Overall	Team	Player	Club/college
1	Rochester Knighthawks	Cody Jamieson	Syracuse University
2	Boston Blazers	Kyle Rubisch	Dowling College
3	Calgary Roughnecks	Curtis Dickson	University of Delaware
4	Minnesota Swarm	Andrew Suitor	R.I.T.
5	Rochester Knighthawks	Jarrett Davis	Bellarmine University
6	Calgary Roughnecks	Dan MacRae	R.I.T.
7	Boston Blazers	David Brock	University at Albany
8	Calgary Roughnecks	Brandon Ivey	Orangeville, Ontario
9	Buffalo Bandits	Travis Irving	New Westminster, British Columbia
10	Rochester Knighthawks	Ryan McClelland	Colgate University

=== 2009 NLL ===
The 2009 entry draft took place in Buffalo, New York, on September 9.

# Overall	Team	Player	Club/college
1	Rochester Knighthawks	Sid Smith	Six Nations Arrows/Syracuse University
2	Rochester Knighthawks	Ilija Gajic	New Westminster Salmonbellies/University of Denver
3	Minnesota Swarm	Zack Greer	Whitby Warriors/Duke University & Bryant University
4	Colorado Mammoth	Cliff Smith	New Westminster Salmonbellies/University of Denver
5	Colorado Mammoth	Alex Gajic	New Westminster Salmonbellies/University of Denver
6	Toronto Rock	Garrett Billings	Burnaby Lakers/University of Virginia
7	Toronto Rock	Joel Dalgarno	Port Coquitlam Saints/Ohio State University
8	Boston Blazers	Max Seibald	Cornell University
9	Edmonton Rush	Corey Small	St. Catharines Athletics/University of Albany
10	Buffalo Bandits	Kyle Clancy	Peterborough Lakers
11	Toronto Rock	Stephen Leblanc	Burnaby Lakers/Queen's University
12	Edmonton Rush	Scott Tinning	Brampton Excelsiors

=== 2008 NLL ===
The 2008 entry draft took place in Boston, Massachusetts, on September 7.

# Overall	Team	Player	Club/college
1	Boston Blazers	Daryl Veltman	Orangeville Northmen/Hobart College
2	San Jose Stealth	Paul Rabil	Johns Hopkins University
3	San Jose Stealth	Rhys Duch	Victoria Shamrocks Jr.A/Stony Brook University
4	Edmonton Rush	Jamie Floris	St. Catharines Athletics/Bellarmine University
5	San Jose Stealth	Kevin Huntley	Johns Hopkins University
6	Calgary Roughnecks	Curtis Manning	New Westminster Salmonbellies Jr.A/Simon Fraser University
7	Colorado Mammoth	Matt Danowski	Duke University
8	Minnesota Swarm	Andrew Watt	Kitchener-Waterloo Braves/Robert Morris College
9	Philadelphia Wings	Sean Thomson	Bellarmine University
10	Edmonton Rush	Ryan Campbell	Brampton Excelsiors/Dowling College
11	Minnesota Swarm	Kevin Buchanan	Ohio State University
12	Portland LumberJax	Tim Campeau	Coquitlam Adanacs Jr.A/Notre Dame de Namur University
13	Minnesota Swarm	Joe Cinosky	University of Maryland

=== 2007 NLL ===
The 2007 entry draft took place on September 1, 2007, at the Pepsi Center in Denver.

# Overall	Team	Player	Club/college
1	New York Titans	Jordan Hall	University of Delaware
2	Philadelphia Wings	Merrick Thomson	University of Albany
3	Boston Blazers	Craig Point	Six Nations Arrows/Onondaga Community College
4	Calgary Roughnecks	Dane Dobbie	Burnaby Lakers Jr.A
5	San Jose Stealth	Frank Resetarits	St. Catharines Athletics/University of Albany
6	Portland Lumberjax	Tyler Codron	Port Coquitlam Saints
7	San Jose Stealth	Tom Johnson	Bellarmine University
8	Rochester Knighthawks	Matt MacLeod	Orangeville Northmen
9	Minnesota Swarm	Justin Norbraten	Bellarmine University
10	Calgary Roughnecks	Peter McFeteridge	Burnaby Lakers Jr.A
11	Boston Blazers	Matt Lyons	Orangeville Northmen
12	Chicago Shamrox	Kevin Ross	Canisius College
13	New York Titans	Mitch Belisle	Cornell University
14	Rochester Knighthawks	Andrew Potter	St. Catharines Athletics

=== 2006 NLL ===
The 2006 entry draft took place on September 13, 2006, at the Madison Square Garden in New York City.

# Overall	Team	Player	Club/college
1	San Jose Stealth	Ryan Benesch	Kitchener-Waterloo Braves
2	San Jose Stealth	Kyle Sorensen	Peterborough Lakers/Bellarmine University
3	Buffalo Bandits	Brett Bucktooth	Syracuse University
4	Philadelphia Wings	Geoff Snider	Burnaby Lakers/University of Denver
5	Philadelphia Wings	Ian Llord	St. Catharines Athletics
6	Arizona Sting	Mike Grimes	Peterborough Lakers
7	San Jose Stealth	Paul Dawson	Brampton Excelsiors
8	Philadelphia Wings	Athan Iannucci	Coquitlam Adanacs Jr.A/St. Catharines Athletics/Hofstra University
9	Calgary Roughnecks	Kyle Wailes	Toronto Beaches/Brown University
10	Rochester Knighthawks	Jack Reid	University of Massachusetts Amherst
11	New York Titans	Brendan Mundorf	University of Maryland
12	Chicago Shamrox	Josh Wasson	University of Hartford
13	Colorado Mammoth	Gary Bining	Ohio State University

=== 2005 NLL ===
The 2005 entry draft took place on August 29, 2005, at Rexall Place in Edmonton.

# Overall	Team	Player	Club/college
1	Portland LumberJax	Brodie Merrill	Orangeville Northmen/Georgetown University
2	Rochester Knighthawks	Shawn Evans	Peterborough Lakers/Bellarmine University
3	Philadelphia Wings	Sean Greenhalgh	St. Catharines Athletics/Cornell University
4	Philadelphia Wings	Luke Wiles	Orillia Rama Kings&St. Catharines Athletics/University of Delaware
5	Arizona Sting	Matt Brown	University of Denver
6	San Jose Stealth	Matt Vinc	St. Catharines Athletics/Canisius College
7	Colorado Mammoth	Dan Carey	Peterborough Lakers/Canisius College
8	San Jose Stealth	Jeff Zywicki	Orillia Rama Kings/University of Massachusetts Amherst
9	Philadelphia Wings	Chad Thompson	N/A
10	Buffalo Bandits	Jeff Shattler	Brampton Excelsiors
11	San Jose Stealth	Ed Brown	Middlebury College

=== 2004 NLL ===
# Overall	Team	Player	Club/college
1	Buffalo Bandits	Delby Powless	Six Nations Arrows/Rutgers University
2	Vancouver Ravens	Rory Glaves	St. Catharines Athletics/University of Hartford
3	San Jose Stealth	Ryan Boyle	Princeton University
4	Arizona Sting	Darren Halls	Orangeville Northmen
5	Philadelphia Wings	Rob VanBeek	Coquitlam Adanacs Jr.A/Saint Vincent College
6	Minnesota Swarm	Ryder Bateman	Victoria Shamrocks Jr.A/Whittier College
7	Vancouver Ravens	Chris McKay	Victoria Shamrocks Jr.A
8	Rochester Knighthawks	Mike Morrison	Brooklin Redmen
9	Calgary Roughnecks	Matt Morehouse	Surrey/BCLA

=== 2003 NLL ===
The 2003 entry draft took place on October 25, 2003, at the Westin Harbour Castle Hotel in Toronto.

# Overall	Team	Player	Club/college
1	Vancouver Ravens	Mark Miyashita	Canisius College
2	Calgary Roughnecks	Taylor Wray	Duke University
3	Philadelphia Wings	Ryan Ward	Butler University
4	Vancouver Ravens	Craig Conn	St. Catharines Athletics&Burnaby Lakers Jr.A/University of Massachusetts Amherst
5	Rochester Knighthawks	Scott Evans	Peterborough Lakers
6	Buffalo Bandits	A.J. Shannon	University of Virginia
7	San Jose Stealth	Scott Ranger	Victoria/BCLA
8	Toronto Rock	Josh Bergey	Salisbury University
9	Philadelphia Wings	Thomas Hajek	St. Catharines Athletics/University of Vermont
10	San Jose Stealth	Kelly Hall	Whittier College
11	Arizona Sting	Kyle Nuefeld	St. Catharines Athletics
12	Vancouver Ravens	Kevin Olson	Burnaby/BCLA

=== 2002 NLL ===
The 2002 entry draft took place on September 17, 2002, at the Air Canada Centre in Toronto.

# Overall	Team	Player	Club/college
1	Toronto Rock	Patrick Merrill	Orangeville Northmen/Mercyhurst College
2	Columbus Landsharks	Jon Harasym	University of Maryland
3	Buffalo Bandits	Billy Dee Smith	St. Catharines Athletics
4	Columbus Landsharks	Travis Gillespie	Limestone College
5	New York Saints	Nick Carlson	Limestone College
6	Ottawa Rebel	Peter Veltman	Orangeville Northmen
7	Columbus Landsharks	Mark Steenhuis	St. Catharines Athletics
8	Albany Attack	Josh Coffman	Syracuse University
9	New York Saints	Chad Culp	Orangeville Northmen
10	Toronto Rock	Brian Croswell	Peterborough Lakers
11	Rochester Knighthawks	Peter Benedict	Onondaga Community College
12	Columbus Landsharks	Steve Dusseau	Georgetown University
13	Toronto Rock	John McLellan	Toronto Beaches

=== 2001 NLL ===
The 2001 entry draft took place on August 25, 2001, at the HSBC Arena in Buffalo.

# Overall	Team	Player	Club/college
1	New York Saints	Gavin Prout	Loyola College
2	Calgary Roughnecks	Blaine Manning	Radford University
3	New Jersey Storm	Scott Stewart	Drexel Dragons
4	Columbus Landsharks	Derek Suddons	University of Hartford
5	Columbus Landsharks	Ryan Cousins	Toronto Beaches
6	Columbus Landsharks	Spencer Martin	Coquitlam
7	Albany Attack	Brian Kazarian	Orangeville Northmen
8	Vancouver Ravens	Geoff Snider	Burnaby Lakers
9	Columbus Landsharks	Bill Greer	Whitby Warriors
10	Vancouver Ravens	Kevin Hanson	Burnaby Lakers
11	Rochester Knighthawks	Teddy Jenner	Mercyhurst College
12	Toronto Rock	Sandy Chapman	Brampton Excelsiors
13	Ottawa Rebel	Andrew Guindon	Burnaby Lakers

=== 2000 NLL ===
The 2000 entry draft took place on September 21, 2000, at the Air Canada Centre in Toronto.

# Overall	Team	Player	Club/college
1	Columbus Landsharks	Tracey Kelusky	University of Hartford
2	Buffalo Bandits	Ryan Powell	Syracuse University
3	New York Saints	Ben Prepchuk	Burnaby Lakers Jr.A
4	Philadelphia Wings	Jeff Ratcliffe	University of Maryland, Baltimore County/ Port Coquitlam Saints
5	Columbus Landsharks	Marshall Abrams	Syracuse University
6	Ottawa Rebel	Jake Lawson	Maple Ridge Burrards WLA
7	New York Saints	A.J. Haugen	Johns Hopkins University
8	Rochester Knighthawks	Lindsay Plunkett	Burnaby Lakers Jr.A
9	Toronto Rock	Jamie Taylor	Burlington Chiefs

=== 1999 NLL ===
The 1999 entry draft took place on September 21, 1999, at the Marine Midland Arena in Buffalo.

# Overall	Team	Player	Club/college
1	Rochester Knighthawks	John Grant, Jr.	Peterborough Lakers/University of Delaware
2	New York Saints	Gord Nash	Whitby Warriors
3	New York Saints	Mark Frye	Loyola College
4	Toronto Rock	John Olson	Burnaby Lakers Jr.A
5	Philadelphia Wings	Greg McCavera	Georgetown University
6	Albany Attack	Scott Stewart	Burlington Chiefs
7	Philadelphia Wings	Gewas Schindler	Loyola College
8	Toronto Rock	Kevin Langdale	Rochester Institute of Technology
9	Rochester Knighthawks	Ben Hunt	Rochester Institute of Technology

=== 1998 NLL ===
The 1998 entry draft took place on September 14, 1998, at the ESL Sports Centre in Rochester.

# Overall	Team	Player	Club/college	
1	Rochester Knighthawks	Casey Powell	Syracuse University	
2	Toronto Rock	Kaleb Toth	Burnaby Lakers WLA	
3	Toronto Rock	Rory Graham	Burnaby Lakers WLA	
4	Baltimore Thunder	Chris Sanderson	University of Virginia	
5	Rochester Knighthawks	Brad MacArthur	Brooklin Redmen	St. Andrews Presbyterian College
6	Philadelphia Wings	Jamie Hanford	Loyola College	
7	Buffalo Bandits	Matt Disher	New Westminster Salmonbellies Jr.A	

=== 1997 NLL ===
# Overall	Team	Player	Club/college
1	Baltimore Thunder	Matt Shearer	Loyola College
2	Boston Blazers	Brendan Glass	University of Massachusetts Amherst
3	Ontario Raiders	Ken Millin	Six Nations Arrows
4	Syracuse Smash	Jim Rankin	Orangeville Northmen
5	New York Saints	Tom Wreggitt	Peterborough Lakers
6	Philadelphia Wings	Rusty Kruger	Orangeville Northmen
7	Buffalo Bandits	Casey Zaph	Peterborough Lakers
8	Buffalo Bandits	Marty O’Brien	Whitby Warriors

=== 1996 NLL ===
# Overall	Team	Player	Club/college
1	New York Saints	Tim Langton	Towson State University
2	Baltimore Thunder	Brian Dougherty	University of Maryland
3	Rochester Knighthawks	Cory Bomberry	Six Nations Arrows
4	Boston Blazers	Chris Panos	Hofstra University
5	Philadelphia Wings	Greg Traynor	University of Virginia
6	Buffalo Bandits	Mike Murray	Orangeville Northmen

== Major Indoor Lacrosse League (MILL) 1st round draft selections ==
=== 1995 MILL ===
# Overall	Team	Player	Club/college
1	New York Saints	Brian Piccola	Johns Hopkins University
2	Philadelphia Wings	Matt Dwan	Loyola College
3	Buffalo Bandits	Jason Luke	St. Catharines Athletics
4	Boston Blazers	Keith Flanigan	Springfield College
5	Rochester Knighthawks	Derek Collins	Scarborough Saints
6	Philadelphia Wings	Peter Jacobs	Johns Hopkins University

=== 1994 MILL ===
# Overall	Team	Player	Club/college
1	Rochester Knighthawks	Cam Bomberry	St. Catharines Athletics/Six Nations Arrows/Nazareth College
2	Philadelphia Wings	Ryan Wade	University of North Carolina
3	Boston Blazers	Robert Felt	Springfield College
4	New York Saints	Kevin Lowe	Princeton University
5	Buffalo Bandits	Rodd Squire	Six Nations Arrows
6	Philadelphia Wings	Scott Reinhardt	Princeton University

=== 1993 MILL ===
# Overall	Team	Player	Club/college
1	Philadelphia Wings	John Webster	University of North Carolina
2	Boston Blazers	Andy Towers	Brown University
3	Detroit Turbos	Greg Van Sickle	N/A
4	New York Saints	Mark Millon	University of Massachusetts Amherst
5	Philadelphia Wings	David Morrow	Princeton University
6	Buffalo Bandits	Gil Nieuwendyk	N/A

=== 1992 MILL ===
# Overall	Team	Player	Club/college
1	Pittsburgh Bulls	Jim Buczek	University of North Carolina
2	Boston Blazers	Dave Donovan	Duke University
3	Baltimore Thunder	Jim Blanding	Loyola College
4	New York Saints	Steve Huff	University of North Carolina
5	Detroit Turbos	Bill Callan	N/A
6	Buffalo Bandits	Tom Marechek	Syracuse University

=== 1991 MILL ===
# Overall	Team	Player	Club/college
1	Buffalo Bandits	Darris Kilgour	St. Catharines Athletics/Nazareth College
2	Boston Blazers	Neil Ringers	Ohio Wesleyan
3	Pittsburgh Bulls	Phil Willard	University of Maryland
4	Philadelphia Wings	Rob Shek	Towson State University
5	New York Saints	Andy Kraus	University of Virginia
6	Baltimore Thunder	Tony Millon	Towson State University
7	Detroit Turbos	John Hamilton	University of Victoria

=== 1990 MILL ===
# Overall	Team	Player	Club/college
1	Detroit Turbos	Gary Gait	Esquimalt Legion Jr.A/Syracuse University
2	Pittsburgh Bulls	Tim Hormes	Washington
3	Baltimore Thunder	Brian Kroneberger	Loyola College
4	New York Saints	Jon Reese	Yale University
5	New England Blazers	Tim Soudan	University of Massachusetts Amherst
6	Detroit Turbos	Paul Gait	Esquimalt Legion Jr.A/Syracuse University

=== 1989 MILL ===
# Overall	Team	Player	Club/college
1	Pittsburgh Bulls	Brendan Kelly	Johns Hopkins University
2	New England Blazers	Toby Boucher	Ohio Wesleyan
3	Baltimore Thunder	Bart Aldridge	University of Delaware
4	Detroit Turbos	Mark Tummillo	University of North Carolina
5	New York Saints	Gordon Purdie	Adelphi University
6	Philadelphia Wings	Chris Flynn	University of Pennsylvania

=== 1988 MILL ===
# Overall	Team	Player	Club/college
1	New England Blazers	David Desko	Syracuse University
2	Detroit Turbos	Ron Martinello	Syracuse University
3	Baltimore Thunder	Tom McClelland	Loyola College
4	Philadelphia Wings	Andy Wilson	Loyola College
5	New York Saints	Tim Goldstein	Cornell University

== See also ==
- National Lacrosse League expansion draft
- National Lacrosse League dispersal draft
