= 1995 Major Indoor Lacrosse League season =

1995 MILL season
- League: Major Indoor Lacrosse League
- Sport: Indoor lacrosse
- Duration: January 7, 1995 - April 8, 1995
- Games: 8
- Teams: 6
- TV partner(s): ESPN and ESPN2

Draft
- Top draft pick: Cam Bomberry
- Picked by: Rochester Knighthawks

Regular season
- League champions: Philadelphia Wings
- Runners-up: Boston Blazers
- Season MVP: Gary Gait (Philadelphia Wings)
- Top scorer: Gary Gait (Philadelphia Wings)

Champion's Cup
- Champions: Philadelphia Wings (4th title)
- Runners-up: Rochester Knighthawks
- Finals MVP: Gary Gait (Philadelphia)

MILL seasons
- ← 1994 season 1996 season →

The 1995 Major Indoor Lacrosse League season is the 9th season of the league that began on January 7, 1995, and concluded with the championship game on April 8, 1995.

== Team movement ==
1995 featured the debut of the Rochester Knighthawks to the MILL, replacing the Detroit Turbos.

=== Teams ===
1995 Major Indoor Lacrosse League
Team	City	Arena	Capacity
Baltimore Thunder	Baltimore, Maryland	Baltimore Arena	10,582
Boston Blazers	Boston, Massachusetts	Boston Garden	14,448
Buffalo Bandits	Buffalo, New York	Buffalo Memorial Auditorium	16,325
New York Saints	Uniondale, New York	Nassau Veterans Memorial Coliseum	16,297
Philadelphia Wings	Philadelphia, Pennsylvania	CoreStates Spectrum	17,380
Rochester Knighthawks	Rochester, New York	Rochester Community War Memorial	10,662

=== Map of teams ===
Major Indoor Lacrosse League Teams

== Regular season ==
P	Team	GP	W	L	PCT	GB	Home	Road	GF	GA	Diff	GF/GP	GA/GP
1	Philadelphia Wings – xyz	8	7	1	.875	0.0	4–0	3–1	115	94	+21	14.38	11.75
2	Boston Blazers – x	8	5	3	.625	2.0	2–2	3–1	93	91	+2	11.62	11.38
3	Rochester Knighthawks – x	8	4	4	.500	3.0	3–1	1–3	97	94	+3	12.12	11.75
4	Buffalo Bandits – x	8	3	5	.375	4.0	2–2	1–3	109	108	+1	13.62	13.50
5	Baltimore Thunder	8	3	5	.375	4.0	2–2	1–3	98	117	−19	12.25	14.62
6	New York Saints	8	2	6	.250	5.0	1–3	1–3	85	93	−8	10.62	11.62

x: Clinched playoff berth; c: Clinched playoff berth by crossing over to another division; y: Clinched division; z: Clinched best regular season record; GP: Games Played
W: Wins; L: Losses; GB: Games back; PCT: Win percentage; Home: Record at Home; Road: Record on the Road; GF: Goals scored; GA: Goals allowed
Differential: Difference between goals scored and allowed; GF/GP: Average number of goals scored per game; GA/GP: Average number of goals allowed per game

== All Star Game ==
No All-Star Game was played in 1995.

== Playoffs ==
Semifinals
1	Philadelphia	19
4	Buffalo	16
2	Boston	8
3	Rochester	10

Championship
3	Rochester	14
1	Philadelphia	15*

- * indicates an overtime period.

== Awards ==
Award	Winner	Team
MVP Award	Gary Gait	Philadelphia
Rookie of the Year Award	Charlie Lockwood	New York
Championship Game MVP	Gary Gait	Philadelphia

=== Weekly awards ===
Each week, a player is awarded "Player of the Week" honours.

Week	Player of the Week
1	Steve Dietrich
2	Marty O'Neill
3	Tom Marechek
4	No award given
5	Thomas Carmean
6	J.J. Pearl
7	Thomas Carmean
8	Steve Dietrich
9	Paul Gait
10	Gary Gait

=== Monthly awards ===
An award is also given out monthly for the best overall player.

Month	Player of the Month
Jan	Ted Dowling
Feb	Gary Gait
Mar	Paul Gait

=== All-Pro Teams ===
First Team:

- Ted Dowling, Boston
- Gary Gait, Philadelphia
- Paul Gait, Rochester
- John Tavares, Buffalo
- Jim Veltman, Buffalo
- Dallas Eliuk, Philadelphia (goalie)

Second Team:

- Thomas Carmean, Boston
- Tim Hormes, Baltimore
- Tom Marechek, Philadelphia
- Bob Martino, Baltimore
- Mark Millon, Baltimore
- Steve Dietrich, Rochester (goalie)

== Statistics leaders ==
Bold numbers indicate new single-season records. Italics indicate tied single-season records.

Stat	Player	Team	Number
Goals	Gary Gait	Philadelphia	30
Assists	Tom Carmean	Boston	27
Points	Gary Gait	Philadelphia	48
Penalty Minutes	Steve Govett	Philadelphia	39
Shots on Goal	Gary Gait	Philadelphia	88
Loose Balls	Jim Veltman	Buffalo	91
Save Pct	Dallas Eliuk	Philadelphia	78.2

== Attendance ==
=== Regular season ===
Home team	Home games	Average attendance	Total attendance
Philadelphia Wings	4	16,706	66,823
Buffalo Bandits	4	15,827	63,306
New York Saints	4	7,916	35,765
Boston Blazers	4	7,850	30,321
Rochester Knighthawks	4	7,386	29,545
Baltimore Thunder	4	6,003	24,012
**League**	**24**	**10,407**	**249,772**

=== Playoffs ===
Home team	Home games	Average attendance	Total attendance
Philadelphia Wings	1	14,824	14,824
Buffalo Bandits	1	10,557	10,557
Rochester Knighthawks	1	7,027	7,027
**League**	**3**	**10,803**	**32,408**

== See also ==
- 1995 in sports
