= Pat Cougevan =

American lacrosse player

Personal information
- Born: July 13, 1971 (age 54) Penn Yan, New York, US
- Height: 6 ft 1 in (185 cm)
- Weight: 215 lb (98 kg; 15 st 5 lb)

Sport
- Position: Defense
- Shoots: right
- NLL team: Rochester Knighthawks
- Pro career: 1996–

Pat Cougevan (born July 13, 1971) is a lacrosse player for the Rochester Knighthawks in the National Lacrosse League. In 2007, he was named the team's "Comeback Player of the Year" after suffering a season-ending injury in the 2006 season.

Cougevan was an All-American lacrosse player at Penn Yan High School in his native Penn Yan, New York.

Cougevan played college lacrosse at Syracuse, helping them win the 1993 NCAA tournament as a senior. After graduation, he was an assistant coach at Colgate for a year before accepting a job as a legislative aide for state Senator Randy Kuhl. Cougevan played in recreational lacrosse leagues until he joined the newly-formed Rochester Knighthawks of the Major Indoor Lacrosse League in 1995. He played in just seven games in his first five seasons, but became a regular member of the rotation during the 2002 season.

Cougevan was inducted into the Rochester Knighthawks Hall of Fame as a member of the class of 2012.

Cougevan has a master's degree in Business Administration from Alfred University and is married.

== Statistics ==
=== NLL ===
		Regular Season						Playoffs
Season	Team	GP	G	A	Pts	LB	PIM	GP	G	A	Pts	LB	PIM
1996	Rochester	1	0	0	0	1	0	--	--	--	--	--	--
1998	Rochester	3	0	1	1	3	4	--	--	--	--	--	--
2000	Rochester	3	0	0	0	3	6	--	--	--	--	--	--
2002	Rochester	16	1	1	2	45	12	2	0	0	0	6	4
2003	Rochester	12	0	1	1	32	9	2	0	0	0	10	0
2004	Rochester	14	0	0	0	27	4	1	1	0	0	0	4
2005	Rochester	15	1	2	3	40	16	2	0	1	1	4	0
2006	Rochester	4	0	1	1	3	4	0	0	0	0	0	0
2007	Rochester	14	0	1	1	25	15	3	0	0	0	3	0
2008	Rochester	14	1	1	2	11	4	--	--	--	--	--	--
2009	Rochester	6	0	0	0	10	0	0	0	0	0	0	0
NLL totals		92	3	8	11	200	74	10	0	1	1	23	8
