= Tim Soudan =

American lacrosse player and coach

Personal information
- Nationality: American
- Born: January 10, 1968 (age 58) Fairport, New York, U.S.
- Height: 5 ft 10 in (178 cm)
- Weight: 200 lb (91 kg; 14 st 4 lb)

Sport
- Position: Midfield / Forward
- Shoots: Right
- Coached by: Denver Outlaws (2023-present); Chrome Lacrosse Club (2020–2023); Rochester Rattlers (2011–2017)
- NCAA team: UMass (1990)
- NLL teams: New England Blazers; Boston Blazers; Rochester Knighthawks
- MLL teams: Rochester Rattlers
- Pro career: 1991–2005

Career highlights
- Rochester Knighthawks Hall of Fame (2009); UMass Hall of Fame (2012)
Medal record
Representing United States
Box lacrosse
Heritage Cup
Gold medal – first place	2002
Field lacrosse
World Lacrosse Championship
Gold medal – first place	1994 England
Gold medal – first place	1998 United States

Tim Soudan is the current head coach for the Denver Outlaws of the Premier Lacrosse League. He joined the team, known as Chrome Lacrosse Club at the time after the conclusion of their 2019 season, replacing legendary coach Dom Starsia. Soudan is a former National Lacrosse League (NLL) and Major League Lacrosse (MLL) player. Soudan was one year too early before the Olympic lacrosse team was formed, and was registered as a player but injured himself making him unable to play. Soudan also played in the NLL for the Boston Blazers (1991–1994) and the Rochester Knighthawks (1995–2005), and in the MLL for the Rochester Rattlers (2001–2003). Soudan coached the Rochester Rattlers from 2011 to 2017, earning coach of the year honors in 2014 and reaching the championship final in 2014 and 2015.

== Playing career ==
=== Field lacrosse ===
In college, he was second team All-American at the University of Massachusetts Amherst in 1989 and 1990. He scored 84 goals for the Minutemen, the program's career record for a midfielder. UMass was 41–14 over his four years, earning an NCAA tournament appearance each year.

In 1994 and 1998, he played for Team USA and won the World Lacrosse Championship both years.

Soudan played professional field lacrosse for the Rochester Rattlers starting in the league's inaugural season in 2001. His three-year career produced 32 goals, 3 two-point goals, and 9 assists for 44 points in 31 games.

=== Box lacrosse ===
Soudan started his indoor career with the New England Blazers in 1991, continuing with the Boston Blazers from 1992 to 1994. Starting in 1995, Soudan played with the Rochester Knighthawks for 11 years, retiring after the 2005 season. In 1996, he was honored as the team's Seventh Man for his hard work and dedication. He was a member of the 1997 MILL Championship team and a key component in the team's string of 11 playoff appearances in 11 seasons. Soudan was inducted into the Rochester Knighthawks Hall of Fame in 2009.

He also earned a gold medal for playing for Team USA in the 2002 Heritage Cup against Team Canada.

== Coaching career ==
In August 2008, Soudan was hired by the Knighthawks as the assistant general manager.

In June 2011, Soudan was hired as the head coach of the Rochester Rattlers. He won the Coach of the Year award in 2014.

In December 2019, Soudan was hired as the head coach of Chrome Lacrosse Club.

== Other ==
Following his retirement from professional lacrosse, Tim became a physical education teacher and assistant lacrosse coach at Fairport High School. He also hosts a boys lacrosse camp and runs the Blaze Lacrosse Club.

He resides in his hometown of Fairport, New York with his wife, Colleen, and children Kaitlyn and Tanner.
