= Matt Leveque =

Canadian lacrosse player

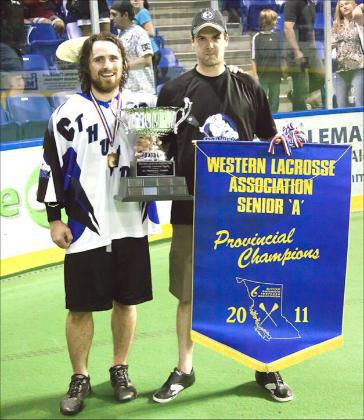

Personal information
- Nationality: Canadian
- Born: September 20, 1984 (age 42) Surrey, British Columbia
- Height: 5 ft 11 in (180 cm)
- Weight: 205 lb (93 kg; 14 st 9 lb)

Sport
- Position: Defenseman
- Shoots: Right
- NLL draft: 57th overall, 2004; Vancouver Ravens
- NLL team: Colorado Mammoth
- WLA team: Langley Thunder
- Pro career: 2006–

Matt Leveque (born September 20, 1984) is a lacrosse player for the Colorado Mammoth in the National Lacrosse League. Leveque was the captain of the Surrey Stickmen and All Star in the British Columbia Junior A league in 2005. During the off season Matt plays for a local team, Langley Thunder.

While playing for the Langley Thunder on August 27, 2011, the team won the Western Lacrosse Association Championship for the first time in franchise history. Leveque is expected to play in the national Mann Cup that will be held in September 2011 at the Langley Events Centre.

== Statistics ==
=== NLL ===
		Regular Season						Playoffs
Season	Team	GP	G	A	Pts	LB	PIM	GP	G	A	Pts	LB	PIM
2006	Colorado Mammoth	4	2	0	2	13	6	2	0	0	0	3	5
2007	Colorado Mammoth	12	1	2	3	35	19	1	0	0	0	2	4
2008	Colorado Mammoth	8	0	1	1	22	13	0	0	0	0	0	0
2009	Colorado Mammoth	12	4	2	6	46	11	1	1	0	1	1	0
2010	Colorado Mammoth	1
2011	Colorado Mammoth	16	0	2	2	36	4	1	0	0	0	0	2
NLL totals		36	7	5	12	116	49	4	1	0	1	6	9

== Postseason - Scoring ==
Year	Lg	Team	GP	G	2G	A	Pts	PIM	PPG	SHG	GWG	Shts	SOG	S%	SG%	GB	TOC	CTO	FO	FW	FO%
2006	NLL	Colorado Mammoth	2	0	0	0	0	5	0	0	0	1	1	0.0	0.0	3	0	0	0	0	
2007	NLL	Colorado Mammoth	1	0	0	0	0	4	0	0	0	2	2	0.0	0.0	2	0	0	0	0	
2009	NLL	Colorado Mammoth	1	1	0	0	1	0	0	0	0	1	1	100.0	100.0	1	0	0	0	0	
2011	NLL	Colorado Mammoth	1	0	0	0	0	2	0	0		0	0			0	3	0	5	0	0.0
Totals			5	1	0	0	1	11	0	0	0	4	4	25.0	25.0	6	3	0	5	0	0.0

== Scoring ==
Year	Lg	Team	GP	G	2G	A	Pts	PIM	PPG	SHG	GWG	Shts	SOG	S%	SG%	GB	TOC	CTO	FO	FW	FO%
2006	NLL	Colorado Mammoth	4	2	0	0	2	8	0	0	0	5	5	40.0	40.0	13	0	0	0	0	
2007	NLL	Colorado Mammoth	12	1	0	2	3	19	0	0	0	5	5	20.0	20.0	35	0	0	0	0	
2008	NLL	Colorado Mammoth	8	0	0	1	1	17	0	0	0	3	3	0.0	0.0	22	0	0	10	5	50.0
2009	NLL	Colorado Mammoth	12	4	0	2	6	19	0	0	0	9	9	44.4	44.4	46	0	0	177	83	46.9
2010	NLL	Colorado Mammoth	1	0	0	0	0	0	0	0	0	0	0			0	0	0	0	0	
2011	NLL	Colorado Mammoth	16	0	0	2	2	4	0	0	0	4	2	0.0	0.0	36	15	3	316	148	46.8
Totals			53	7	0	7	14	67	0	0	0	26	24	26.9	29.2	152	15	3	503	236	46.9
