= Charlotte Cobras =

American indoor lacrosse team

- Sport: Box lacrosse
- Founded: 1995
- Disbanded: 1996
- League: Major Indoor Lacrosse League
- Location: Charlotte, North Carolina
- Arena: Independence Arena
- Colors: Red, Black
- Playoff appearances: 0

The Charlotte Cobras were a member of the Major Indoor Lacrosse League (MILL). They were based at Independence Arena in Charlotte, North Carolina, and only played during the 1996 season. In October 1995, the MILL announced that Charlotte had been awarded an expansion franchise to begin play for the 1996 season. After failing to win a single game for the season, the MILL folded the franchise in August 1996.

The name was later alluded to in the name of the Carolina Cobras, which played in the Arena Football League. There is a Charlotte Cobras playing as a works team of city public employees in the National Public Safety Football League.

== Game log ==
Game	Date	Opponent	Location	Score	OT	Attendance	Record
1	January 12, 1996	Boston Blazers (1992-1997)	Independence Arena	L 4–17		3,695	0–1
2	January 13, 1996	@ Boston Blazers (1992-1997)	Boston Garden	L 9–19		8,081	0–2
3	January 20, 1996	@ Rochester Knighthawks (1995-2019)	Blue Cross Arena	L 9–19		7,373	0–3
4	January 27, 1996	Baltimore Thunder	Independence Arena	L 6–16		3,012	0–4
5	February 10, 1996	@ Baltimore Thunder	Baltimore Arena	L 10–14		5,602	0–5
6	February 16, 1996	New York Saints	Independence Arena	L 9–20		2,108	0–6
7	February 24, 1996	@ Buffalo Bandits	Buffalo Memorial Auditorium	L 6–28		15,741	0–7
8	March 2, 1996	Philadelphia Wings	Independence Arena	L 8–14		2,813	0–8
9	March 9, 1996	@ Philadelphia Wings	CoreStates Spectrum	L 11–26		16,244	0–9
10	March 23, 1996	Rochester Knighthawks (1995-2019)	Independence Arena	L 12–17		2,174	0–10

Season	W-L	Finish	Home	Road	GF	GA	Coach	Playoffs
1996	0–10	7th	0–5	0–5	85	186	Joe Seivold	Missed playoffs
Total	0–10		0–5	0–5	85	186		
