= Rochester Knighthawks (1995–2019) =

Former Professional lacrosse team in Rochester, New York, United States

- Founded: 1995
- Folded: 2019
- League: National Lacrosse League
- Division: Eastern
- Based in: Rochester, New York
- Arena: Blue Cross Arena
- Colors: Purple, Teal, White
- League titles: 5 (1997, 2007, 2012, 2013, 2014)
- Division titles: 10 (1995, 1997, 1999, 2000, 2003, 2007, 2012, 2013, 2014, 2018)
- Later: Halifax Thunderbirds

The original Rochester Knighthawks (also known as the K-Hawks) were a professional box lacrosse team in the National Lacrosse League. They played in Rochester, New York at the Blue Cross Arena at the War Memorial. The Knighthawks were previously members of the Major Indoor Lacrosse League from 1995 to 1997. They were members of the NLL since the league's inaugural 1998 season.

The Knighthawks reached the playoffs in each of their first 13 seasons, from 1995 to 2007. This is a league record going back to the league's original creation, the Eagle Pro Box Lacrosse League. The previous record was 11 straight years, held by the Philadelphia Wings. They were also the first NLL team to win three consecutive championships (2012–14).

The new Knighthawks are owned by the Seneca Nation of New York, via their subsidiary Seneca Holdings, LLC. They took over in 2025 from previous owner Terry Pegula, who had purchased the intellectual property of the original Knighthawks in 2019 from former owner Curt Styres who moved the previous version of the team to Halifax, Nova Scotia as the Halifax Thunderbirds at the end of the 2018–2019 season. As an expansion team they are not a continuation of the original Knighthawks. All records and championships were transferred to Halifax.

== History ==
The Rochester Knighthawks found success throughout their history despite playing in a small market.

In their inaugural season they finished 3rd during the regular season and dispatched the Boston Blazers in the playoff semifinals to get to the finals as an expansion team. As they would do three times later on, they found themselves coming up just short in the championship game, falling in overtime to the Philadelphia Wings.

Just two seasons later, the Knighthawks would find their way to the top of the MILL heap, claiming the final North American Cup before the merger with the National Lacrosse League prior to the 1998 season. It would be ten years before the Knighthawks claimed their second title. They beat the Arizona Sting in the 2007 Championship by a score of 13–11. In 2012, the Knighthawks defeated the Edmonton Rush for the Championship by a score of 9–6. In 2013, the Knighthawks became the first team in the league to clinch back-to-back championship titles since the Toronto Rock in 2002 and 2003 by defeating the Washington Stealth 11–10. In 2014, the Knighthawks set a new league record by winning their third straight championship title.

=== 2007 season ===
After starting the season with a record of 2-2, the Knighthawks beat the Toronto Rock 19–15 in Toronto, where they had only won twice before in team history. The Knighthawks followed this victory up with 11 more, finishing the season with a franchise-record 12 regular-season-game winning streak and a 14–2 record. The Knighthawks were a perfect 8–0 at home, becoming the first team since the 2003 Bandits to post a perfect record at home. The winning streak was extended to 13 games after they defeated the Rock 10–6 in the division semi-finals; and to 14 after beating the Bandits in overtime, 14–13, for the East Division title. After the season, head coach Ed Comeau was named the 2007 Les Bartley Award winner.

Despite having the best overall record, they could not host the championship game due to a scheduling conflict with the Ringling Bros. and Barnum & Bailey Circus at the Blue Cross Arena. Playing the game instead in Arizona, the Knighthawks defeated the Arizona Sting 13–11 on May 12, 2007, to win their first NLL championship. John Grant, Jr., regular-season league MVP, was named MVP of the game.

The winning streak continued during the 2008 season, as the Knighthawks defeated the Buffalo Bandits in the opening game on January 11, 2008. However, the next night in Rochester, the streak was halted at 16 games as they were defeated by the Bandits 14–9.

=== Lease issue ===
During the 2007 season, a dispute over concession revenues between owner Steve Donner and the Sports Management Group, then operators of the Blue Cross Arena, jeopardized the continued play of the Knighthawks in Rochester. Donner claimed that the Knighthawks and the Rochester Americans of the American Hockey League had lost over $500,000 the previous two seasons, and without concession revenue sharing, he would be unable to continue to operate the teams in Rochester. An agreement was reached between the Amerks/Knighthawks SMG, and the City of Rochester on a one-year lease extension on May 11, 2007, that would allow for long-term negotiations to continue through both teams' 2008 season. Under the extension, the Amerks/Knighthawks agreed to an independent audit of their finances and the city agreed to forgo additional luxury suite revenue from the arena and to loan the Amerks an additional $100,000, added on to a $500,000 loan that is now past-due. On June 16, 2008, the Knighthawks and Americans announced a new five-year lease with the Blue Cross Arena.

=== Curt Styres era ===
On May 28, 2008, the National Lacrosse League's Board of Governors approved the sale of a majority stake of the Knighthawks to the President of Arrow Express Sports Curt Styres at a price of $5,575,000, the highest price paid for a team in league history. The league's approval was conditional upon whether or not the Knighthawks and Sports Management Group could secure a new lease for play at the Blue Cross Arena. Styres had also recently been approved by the American Hockey League to purchase the Americans. On June 16, 2008, the Knighthawks and Americans announced a new five-year lease with the Blue Cross Arena.

In June 2011, the Americans and Knighthawks were split up when Terrence Pegula purchased the Americans. The split was necessary at the time due to Pegula owning the Buffalo Bandits. This is a rule that would later be changed.

== Original team relocation and replacement ==
On September 13, 2018, Styres announced that he would be accepting a new team in Halifax, Nova Scotia and would be relocating the Knighthawks to the city for the winter 2019–2020 season. The Knighthawks intellectual property was sold to Terry and Kim Pegula (the latter of whom was raised in the Rochester suburbs) along with an expansion franchise to ensure Rochester's uninterrupted presence in the league. The original name was used, but the color scheme and logo changed. The team logo, colors, and other officials were announced on May 29, 2019, in an event at Blue Cross Arena. The new franchise does not count as a continuation of the previous franchise. All championships and records were transferred to Halifax.

== Awards and honors ==
Year	Player	Award
1997	Steve Dietrich	Championship Cup MVP
2000	John Grant, Jr.	Rookie of the Year
2003	Pat O'Toole	Goaltender of the Year
2004	Paul Day	Les Bartley Award
2005	Andrew Turner	Defensive Player of the Year
2007	John Grant, Jr.	Most Valuable Player
2007	Ed Comeau	Les Bartley Award
2007	Steve Toll	Transition Player of the Year
2007	John Grant, Jr.	Champion's Cup MVP
2010	Shawn Williams	Sportsmanship Award
2011	Matt Vinc	Goaltender of the Year
2011	Pat McCready	Defensive Player of the Year
2011	Jordan Hall	Sportsmanship Award
2011	Curt Styres	GM of the Year
2011	Mike Hasen	Les Bartley Award
2011	Curt Styres	Executive of the Year Award
2012	Johnny Powless	Sportsmanship Award
2012	Cody Jamieson	Champion's Cup MVP
2013	Matt Vinc	Goaltender of the Year
2013	Cody Jamieson	Champion's Cup MVP
2014	Dan Dawson	Champion's Cup MVP
2015	Matt Vinc	Goaltender of the Year

=== NLL Hall of Fame members ===
- Gary Gait, 2009–2011 (class of 2006)
- Paul Gait, 1995–1997 (class of 2006)
- Steve Dietrich, 1995–2001 (class of 2012)
- Pat O'Toole 1999–2010 (class of 2013)

== Final roster ==
Rochester Knighthawks roster
Active (21-man) roster		Inactive roster	Coaches
Goaltenders: 76 (Haudenosaunee) Warren Hill; 55 (Haudenosaunee) Angus Goodleaf; Defensemen: 25 (Canada) James Barclay; 37 (Canada) Scott Campbell (C); 2 (Canada) Paul Dawson (A); 12 (Haudenosaunee) Oran Horn; 4 (Canada) Graeme Hossack (A); 29 (Canada) Ian Llord; 45 (Canada) Luc Magnan; 73 (Haudenosaunee) Leland Powless; 9 (Canada) Darryl Robertson; 20 (Canada) Luke Van Schepen; 21 (Canada) Eric Shewell; 18 (Canada) Jake Withers	Forwards: 3 (Canada) Eric Fannell; 47 (Haudenosaunee) Kyle Jackson; 88 (Haudenosaunee) Cody Jamieson (A); 77 (Haudenosaunee) Quinn Powless; 15 (United States) Joe Resetarits; 96 (Canada) Dylan Riley; 14 (Canada) Pat Saunders; 11 (Canada) Austin Shanks; 23 (Canada) Cory Vitarelli; Transition: 10 (Canada) Brad Gillies	Practice squad: 7 (Canada) Cam Milligan; Injured reserve: 79 (Haudenosaunee) Sid Smith; Unable to play: 13 (Canada) Brandon Robinson	Head coach {{{Head Coach}}} Legend: * Suspended list; (C) Captain; (A) Alternate captain; Roster updated 2019-01-18; NLL Transactions

== All-time record ==
Season	Division	W–L	Finish	Home	Road	GF	GA	Coach	Playoffs
1995		4–4	3rd	3–1	1–3	97	94	Barry Powless	lost final
1996		6–4	4th	4–1	2–3	148	137	Barry Powless	lost semi-final
1997		5–5	4th	2–3	3–2	156	135	Barry Powless	Champions
1998		6–6	3rd	3–3	3–3	168	156	Paul Day	lost semi-final
1999		8–4	3rd	4–2	4–2	169	160	Paul Day	lost final
2000		8–4	3rd	5–1	3–3	187	149	Paul Day	lost final
2001		10–4	3rd	6–1	4–3	198	159	Paul Day	lost semi-final
2002	Central	13–3	2nd	8–0	5–3	261	202	Paul Day	lost division final
2003	Central	12–4	1st	6–2	6–2	214	173	Paul Day	lost final
2004	Eastern	8–8	2nd	6–2	2–6	173	186	Paul Day	lost division semi-final
2005	Eastern	10–6	3rd	5–3	5–3	193	179	Paul Day	lost division final
2006	Eastern	9–7	2nd	6–2	3–5	196	180	Ed Comeau	lost division final
2007	Eastern	14–2	1st	8–0	6–2	249	194	Ed Comeau	Champions
2008	Eastern	8–8	5th	4–4	4–4	197	171	Ed Comeau	did not qualify
2009	Eastern	7–9	4th	6–2	1–7	169	197	Paul Gait	lost division semi-final
2010	Eastern	7–9	5th	4–4	3–5	155	181	Paul Gait	did not qualify
2011	Eastern	10–6	3rd	4–4	6–2	176	159	Mike Hasen	lost division semi-final
2012	Eastern	7–9	2nd	5–3	2–6	191	197	Mike Hasen	Champions
2013	Eastern	8–8	2nd	3–5	5–3	179	165	Mike Hasen	Champions
2014	Eastern	14–4	1st	8–1	6–3	210	167	Mike Hasen	Champions
2015	Eastern	12–6	2nd	7–2	5–4	205	173	Mike Hasen	lost division final
2016	Eastern	7–11	4th	3–6	4–5	200	215	Mike Hasen	did not qualify
2017	Eastern	7–11	4th	4–5	3–6	175	209	Mike Hasen	did not qualify
2018	Eastern	10-8	2nd	5–4	5–4	236	210	Mike Hasen	lost final
2019	Eastern	6-12	5th	4-5	2-7	212	226	Mike Hasen	did not qualify
Total	24 seasons	208–144		118–58	90–86	4,402	4,048		
Playoff totals	20 Appearances	27–19		17–3	10–16	499	492		5 championships

== Playoff results ==
Season	Game	Visiting	Home
1995	Semifinals	Buffalo 8	Rochester 10
1995	Championship	Rochester 14	Philadelphia 15 (OT)
1996	Semifinals	Rochester 10	Buffalo 18
1997	Semifinals	Rochester 15	Philadelphia 13
1997	Championship	Rochester 15	Buffalo 12
1998	Semifinals	Rochester 14	Baltimore 15
1999	Semifinals	Rochester 14	Baltimore 12
1999	Championship	Rochester 10	Toronto 13
2000	Semifinals	Rochester 15	Buffalo 11
2000	Championship	Rochester 13	Toronto 14
2001	Semifinals	Rochester 11	Philadelphia 12
2002	Quarterfinals	Vancouver 10	Rochester 11
2002	Semifinals	Rochester 10	Albany 14
2003	Semifinals	Buffalo 13	Rochester 16
2003	Championship	Toronto 8	Rochester 6
2004	Division Semifinals	Buffalo 13	Rochester 9
2005	Division Semifinals	Rochester 17	Buffalo 16
2005	Division Finals	Rochester 10	Toronto 12
2006	Division Semifinals	Rochester 16	Toronto 8
2006	Division Finals	Buffalo 15	Rochester 10
2007	Division Semifinals	Toronto 6	Rochester 10
2007	Division Finals	Buffalo 13	Rochester 14 (OT)
2007	Championship*	Rochester 13	Arizona 11
2008	missed playoffs		
2009	Division Semifinals	Rochester 10	New York 11 (OT)
2010	missed playoffs		
2011	Division Semifinals	Rochester 6	Toronto 13
2012	Division Semifinals	Philadelphia 13	Rochester 14
2012	Division Finals	Rochester 17	Toronto 13
2012	Championship	Edmonton 6	Rochester 9
2013	Division Semifinals	Philadelphia 8	Rochester 10
2013	Division Finals	Minnesota 10	Rochester 12
2013	Championship	Rochester 11	Washington 10
2014	Division Finals	Rochester 8	Buffalo 12
2014	Division Finals	Buffalo 8	Rochester 13
2014	Division Finals	Buffalo 1	Rochester 2 (OT)
2014	Championship	Rochester 7	Calgary 10
2014	Championship	Calgary 10	Rochester 16
2014	Championship	Calgary 2	Rochester 3
2015	Division Semifinals	Rochester 14	Buffalo 11
2015	Division Finals	Toronto (2)	Rochester (1)
2016	missed playoffs		
2017	missed playoffs		
2018	Division Semifinals	New England 11	Rochester 15
2018	Division Finals	Rochester 9	Georgia 8
2018	Championship	Rochester 9	Saskatchewan 16
2018	Championship	Saskatchewan 8	Rochester 13
2018	Championship	Rochester 10	Saskatchewan 15
2019	missed playoffs		

*The Knighthawks had the overall top seed in the playoffs, but were unable to host the Championship game due to a scheduling conflict at the Blue Cross Arena.

== Head coaching history ==
#	Name	Term	Regular season				Playoffs			
#	Name	Term	GC	W	L	W%	GC	W	L	W%
1	Barry Powless	1995—1997	28	15	13	.536	5	3	2	.600
2	Paul Day	1998—2005	114	75	39	.658	13	5	8	.385
3	Ed Comeau	2006—2008	48	31	17	.646	5	4	1	.800
4	Paul Suggate	2009	Resigned prior to season							
5	Paul Gait	2009—2010	16	7	9	.438	1	0	1	.000
6	Mike Hasen	2011—2019	120	65	55	.552	17	12	5	.706

== Draft history ==
=== NLL Entry Draft ===
First Round Selections

- 1994: Cam Bomberry (1st overall)
- 1995: Derek Collins (5th overall)
- 1996: Cory Bomberry (3rd overall)
- 1997: None
- 1998: Casey Powell (1st overall) & Brad MacArthur (5th overall)
- 1999: John Grant (1st overall) & Ben Hunt (9th overall)
- 2000: Lindsay Plunkett (8th overall)
- 2001: Teddy Jenner (11th overall)
- 2002: Pete Benedict (11th overall)
- 2003: Scott Evans (5th overall)
- 2004: Mike Morrison (8th overall)
- 2005: Shawn Evans (2nd overall)
- 2006: Jack Reid (10th overall)
- 2007: Matt McLeod (8th overall) & Andrew Potter (14th overall)
- 2008: None
- 2009: Sid Smith (1st overall)
- 2010: Cody Jamieson (1st overall)
- 2011: Stephen Keogh (2nd overall), Johnny Powless (5th overall)
- 2012: Carson Michaud (56th overall)
- 2013: None
- 2014: Jeremy Noble (2nd overall)
- 2015: Graeme Hossack (2nd overall), Brad Gillies (9th overall)

=== NLL Dispersal Draft ===
- 2002 from Montreal Express: Steve Penny (10th overall); Declined to pick (22nd overall)
- 2003 from Ottawa Rebel: Mat Giles (10th overall); Shawn Zettel (21st overall); Declined to pick (32nd overall)
- 2004 from Vancouver Ravens: Chris McKay (5th overall); Peter Morgan (14th overall)
- 2005 from Anaheim Storm: Cam Bergman (8th overall)
- 2007 from Arizona Sting & Boston Blazers: Jack Reid, Boston (12th overall); Matt Lyons, Arizona (13th overall); Alex Smith, Arizona (36th overall)
- 2008 from Arizona Sting: Lindsay Plunkett (5th overall); Matt Brown (18th overall)
- 2008 from Chicago Shamrox: Mike Kirk (4th overall); Bobby McBride (16th overall); Craig Robertson (24th overall); Pat Saunders (25th overall); Brock Boyle (26th overall)
- 2009 from Arizona Sting: Dan Stroup (17th overall)
- 2010 from Orlando Titans: Jordan Hall (3rd overall); Dan Hardy (13th overall); Kenny Nims (23rd overall); Mike Evans (33rd overall); Bobby Horsey (40th overall)
- 2011 from Boston Blazers: Mike Kirk (5th overall), Casey Powell (14th overall), Jack Reid (23rd overall)

=== NLL Expansion Draft ===
- 1999 to Albany Attack: Josh Sanderson (2nd overall)
- 2001 to Calgary Roughnecks, New Jersey Storm, Vancouver Ravens & Columbus Landsharks: Randy Mearns, Calgary (8th overall); Marc Landriault, Calgary (14th overall); Lindsay Plunkett, Vancouver (16th overall); Kevin Howard, Calgary (30th overall)
- 2004 to Minnesota Swarm: Jon Harasym (N/A overall)
- 2005 to Portland Lumberjax & Edmonton Rush: Pat Campbell, Edmonton (8th overall); Mat Giles, Portland (9th overall)
- 2006 to Chicago Shamrox & New York Titans: Carter Livingstone, Chicago (17th overall); Ryan O'Connor, Chicago (19th overall)
- 2007 to Boston Blazers: Brian Croswell (13th overall)
- 2008 to Boston Blazers: Matt Lyons (3rd overall)

== See also ==
- Rochester Knighthawks seasons

Preceded by Buffalo Bandits	Major Indoor Lacrosse League Champions; 1997	Succeeded by Philadelphia Wings (NLL)
Preceded by Colorado Mammoth	National Lacrosse League Champions; 2007	Succeeded by Buffalo Bandits
Preceded by Toronto Rock	National Lacrosse League Champions; 2012, 2013, 2014	Succeeded by Edmonton Rush
