= 1997 Major Indoor Lacrosse League season =

1997 MILL season
- League: Major Indoor Lacrosse League
- Sport: Indoor lacrosse
- Duration: January 4, 1997 - April 12, 1997
- Games: 10
- Teams: 6
- TV partner(s): ESPN and ESPN2

Regular season
- League champions: Philadelphia Wings
- Runners-up: New York Saints
- Season MVP: Gary Gait (Baltimore Thunder)
- Top scorer: Gary Gait (Baltimore Thunder)

Champion's Cup
- Champions: Rochester Knighthawks (1st title)
- Runners-up: Buffalo Bandits
- Finals MVP: Steve Dietrich (Rochester)

MILL/NLL seasons
- ← 1996 season 1998 season →

The 1997 season is the 11th season of the league and, is the last as the MILL, began on January 4, 1997, and concluded with the championship game on April 12. The league was renamed to the National Lacrosse League after this season.

== Team movement ==
The Charlotte Cobras, who debuted in the 1996 Major Indoor Lacrosse League season, folded after only a single winless season.

=== Teams ===
1997 Major Indoor Lacrosse League
| Team | City | Arena | Capacity |
| Baltimore Thunder | Baltimore, Maryland | Baltimore Arena | 10,582 |
| Boston Blazers | Boston, Massachusetts | FleetCenter | 17,850 |
| Buffalo Bandits | Buffalo, New York | Marine Midland Arena | 18,595 |
| New York Saints | Uniondale, New York | Nassau Veterans Memorial Coliseum | 16,297 |
| Philadelphia Wings | Philadelphia, Pennsylvania | CoreStates Center | 19,463 |
| Rochester Knighthawks | Rochester, New York | Rochester Community War Memorial | 10,662 |

=== Map of teams ===
Major Indoor Lacrosse League Teams

== Regular season ==
| P | Team | GP | W | L | PCT | GB | Home | Road | GF | GA | Diff | GF/GP | GA/GP |
|---|---|---|---|---|---|---|---|---|---|---|---|---|---|
| 1 | Philadelphia Wings – xyz | 10 | 7 | 3 | .700 | 0.0 | 3–2 | 4–1 | 137 | 115 | +22 | 13.70 | 11.50 |
| 2 | New York Saints – x | 10 | 6 | 4 | .600 | 1.0 | 4–1 | 2–3 | 134 | 127 | +7 | 13.40 | 12.70 |
| 3 | Buffalo Bandits – x | 10 | 6 | 4 | .600 | 1.0 | 3–2 | 3–2 | 158 | 153 | +5 | 15.80 | 15.30 |
| 4 | Rochester Knighthawks – x | 10 | 5 | 5 | .500 | 2.0 | 2–3 | 3–2 | 156 | 135 | +21 | 15.60 | 13.50 |
| 5 | Boston Blazers | 10 | 4 | 6 | .400 | 3.0 | 3–2 | 1–4 | 120 | 135 | −15 | 12.00 | 13.50 |
| 6 | Baltimore Thunder | 10 | 2 | 8 | .200 | 5.0 | 1–4 | 1–4 | 125 | 165 | −40 | 12.50 | 16.50 |

x: Clinched playoff berth; c: Clinched playoff berth by crossing over to another division; y: Clinched division; z: Clinched best regular season record; GP: Games Played
W: Wins; L: Losses; GB: Games back; PCT: Win percentage; Home: Record at Home; Road: Record on the Road; GF: Goals scored; GA: Goals allowed
Differential: Difference between goals scored and allowed; GF/GP: Average number of goals scored per game; GA/GP: Average number of goals allowed per game

== All Star Game ==
No All-Star Game was played in 1997.

== Playoffs ==
Semifinals
2 | New York | 10
3 | Buffalo | 19
4 | Rochester | 15
1 | Philadelphia | 13

Championship
4 | Rochester | 15
3 | Buffalo | 12

== Awards ==
| Award | Winner | Team |
|---|---|---|
| MVP Award | Gary Gait | Philadelphia |
| Rookie of the Year Award | Jeff Wilfong | Boston |
| Championship Game MVP | Steve Dietrich | Rochester |

=== Weekly awards ===
Each week, a player is awarded "Player of the Week" honours.

| Week | Player of the Week |
|---|---|
| 1 | Paul Gait |
| 2 | Roy Colsey |
| 3 | Sal LoCascio |
| 4 | Paul Gait |
| 5 | Paul Gait |
| 6 | John Tavares |
| 7 | Derek Collins |
| 8 | Thomas Carmean |
| 9 | Matt Panetta |
| 10 | Tom Marechek |
| 11 | Ted Dowling |
| 12 | Dallas Eliuk |

=== Monthly awards ===
An award is also given out monthly for the best overall player.

| Month | Player of the Month |
|---|---|
| Jan | Paul Gait |
| Feb | Derek Collins |
| Mar | Tom Marechek |

=== All-Pro Teams ===
First Team:

- Gary Gait, Philadelphia
- Paul Gait, Rochester
- Tom Marechek, Philadelphia
- Mark Millon, New York
- John Tavares, Buffalo
- Dallas Eliuk, Philadelphia (goalie)

Second Team:

- Thomas Carmean, Boston
- Duane Jacobs, Rochester
- Darris Kilgour, Buffalo
- Jeff Klodzen, Baltimore
- Bob Martino, Baltimore
- Sal LoCascio, New York (goalie)

== Statistics leaders ==
Bold numbers indicate new single-season records. Italics indicate tied single-season records.

| Stat | Player | Team | Number |
|---|---|---|---|
| Goals | Gary Gait | Philadelphia | 40 |
| Assists | Gary Gait | Philadelphia | 32 |
| Points | Gary Gait | Philadelphia | 72 |
| Penalty Minutes | Tom Phair | Buffalo | **58** |
| Shots on Goal | Paul Gait | Rochester | **131** |
| Loose Balls | John Tavares | Buffalo | 104 |

== Attendance ==
=== Regular season ===
| Home team | Home games | Average attendance | Total attendance |
|---|---|---|---|
| Buffalo Bandits | 5 | 17,533 | 87,665 |
| Philadelphia Wings | 5 | 13,875 | 69,336 |
| New York Saints | 5 | 7,268 | 36,338 |
| Rochester Knighthawks | 5 | 6,570 | 32,852 |
| Boston Blazers | 5 | 6,149 | 30,743 |
| Baltimore Thunder | 5 | 5,018 | 25,091 |
| **League** | **30** | **9,401** | **282,025** |

=== Playoffs ===
| Home team | Home games | Average attendance | Total attendance |
|---|---|---|---|
| Buffalo Bandits | 2 | 15,085 | 30,170 |
| Philadelphia Wings | 1 | 9,372 | 9,372 |
| **League** | **3** | **13,181** | **39,542** |

== See also ==
- 1997 in sports
