= Burnaby Lakers Jr. A =

Burnaby Lakers
City	Burnaby, British Columbia
League	BC Junior A Lacrosse League
Founded	1969
Home Arena	Bill Copeland Arena
Colours	Green, White, Black
Head coach	Russ Heard
Assistant coaches	Tyler Kirkby
General Manager	Brad Parker
Alternate Governor	Brad Parker
President/Governor	Brad Hara

The Burnaby Lakers are a Junior "A" box lacrosse team from Burnaby, British Columbia. The Lakers play in the British Columbia Junior A Lacrosse League.

Burnaby Cablevision 1969 - 1989
Burnaby Lakers 1990 - present

== Dynasties ==
=== 1970s ===
During the 1970s, the Cablevision won seven league championships and three straight Minto Cup national championships (1977–1979).

=== Late 1990s/2000s ===
From 1996 to 2007, the Lakers won 12 straight league championships, which included three undefeated regular seasons (1998, 1999, 2006). The Lakers had a total record of 242-26-1 during those 12 seasons. They would also win the Minto Cup 5 times (1998, 2000, 2002, 2004, 2005).

== See also ==
- Burnaby Lakers (WLA) - the Senior "A" affiliate that competes in the Western Lacrosse Association.
