= Tom Wreggitt =

Canadian lacrosse player

Tom Wreggitt is a former Canadian National Lacrosse League and Ontario Lacrosse Association player. He was a fifth overall pick in the 1997 NLL Draft. Wreggitt is currently a member of the Ontario Lacrosse Hall of Fame. He has four Mann Cup rings with the Brooklin Redman (1985, 1987, 1988 and 1990). He is ranked 14th all time in OLA scoring with 426 goals, 654 assists, and 1,080 points.
