= Robert Morris Colonials men's lacrosse =

Robert Morris Colonials
- Founded: 2005 (varsity)
- University: Robert Morris
- Head coach: Craig McDonald (since 2021 season)
- Stadium: Joe Walton Stadium (capacity: 3,000)
- Location: Moon Township, Pennsylvania
- Conference: Northeast Conference
- Nickname: Colonials
- Colors: Blue, white, and red

NCAA Tournament appearances
- (5) 2018, 2019, 2022, 2025, 2026

Conference Tournament championships
- (3) 2018, 2019, 2022

Conference regular season championships
- (3) 2012, 2018, 2019

The Robert Morris Colonials men's lacrosse team represents Robert Morris University in National Collegiate Athletic Association (NCAA) Division I men's lacrosse. The Colonials became a varsity program in 2005.

== History ==
Robert Morris currently competes in the Northeast Conference (NEC). The Colonials, which had been full NEC members from 1981 to 2020, returned men's lacrosse to that conference after the 2024 season, coinciding with the NEC's reinstatement of that sport after a two-season hiatus. The Colonials play home games at Joe Walton Stadium on the RMU campus in the Pittsburgh suburb of Moon Township, Pennsylvania.

Before rejoining NEC men's lacrosse, RMU had housed that sport in the Atlantic Sun Conference (ASUN). After leaving the NEC in 2020 to join the Horizon League, which does not sponsor men's lacrosse, the Colonials played as an independent for the 2021 season. Shortly before the start of that season, RMU was unveiled as a member of the newly reinstated ASUN men's lacrosse league, which started play in the 2022 season.

In 2018, Robert Morris was the number one seed in the NEC year-end tournament, reaching the finals where they defeated Saint Joseph’s 9-8 to reach their first NCAA tournament in lacrosse.

Robert Morris joined the ASUN in 2022, winning the initial ASUN title and automatic NCAA bid.

Robert Morris is 130–145 (.473) over 17 Seasons, with 7 NEC Tournaments, 2 NEC Tournament titles, 1 ASUN Tournament title, 3 NCAA Tournaments and 1 NEC Regular-Season title.

== Annual record ==
=== Season Records ===
Year	Wins	Losses	Percent	Conference	Playoffs	National Rank	SOS	RPI	Power Rating ^{(1)}
2025	3	2	.600						
2024	5	10	.333	6th	ASUN Championship				
2023	8	8	.500	6th	ASUN Semifinals		41	53	52
2022	10	6	.625	2nd	NCAA 1st Round ^{(2)}		52	34	40
2021	7	6	.538				23	29	26
2020	4	2	.667				66	61	49
2019	9	8	.529	1st	NCAA 1st Round ^{(3)}		65	30	22
2018	13	5	.722	1st	NCAA 1st Round ^{(4)}	20	54	17	9
2017	9	7	.563	5th			58	42	45
2016	7	8	.467	2nd	NEC Semifinals		52	40	42
2015	3	11	.214	5th			48	62	53
2014	5	9	.357	5th			64	33	31
2013	8	7	.533	2nd	NEC Finals ^{(5)}		50	53	55
2012	11	4	.733	1st	NEC Semifinals		46	46	50
2011	9	6	.600	3rd	NEC Semifinals		14	55	58
2010	10	5	.667	3rd			53	55	58
2009	9	7	.563	3rd			53	55	58
2008	4	11	.267	7th					
2007	3	9	.250	7th					

^{(1)} Laxpower/LaxBytes Power Ratings
^{(2)} Won ASUN tournament final 18-17 in overtime over Utah. Lost 1st Round NCAA tournament game to Delaware 20–8.
^{(3)} Won NEC tournament final 11-10 over Hobart. Lost 1st Round NCAA tournament game to UVA 19-10.
^{(4)} Won NEC tournament final 9-8 over Saint Joseph's. Won NCAA play in game over Canisius 12-6. Lost 1st Round NCAA tournament game to Maryland 14-11.
^{(5)} Lost NEC tournament final 14-7 to Bryant.

=== Head coaching records ===
Season	Coach	Overall	Conference	Standing	Postseason
(Independent, Colonial Athletic Conference, Northeast Conference) (2005–2011)
Kenneth "Bear" Davis:		36–64 (.360)	7–26 (.212)		
(Northeast Conference) (2012–2021)
Andrew McMinn:		76–67 (.531)	28–18 (.609)		
(Southern Conference, Atlantic Sun Conference) (2022–2024)
Craig McDonald:		18–14 (.563)	8–6 (.571)		
(Northeast Conference) (2025–present)
Craig McDonald:		26–26 (.500)	12–11 (.522)		
Total:		138–157 (.468)			
National champion Postseason invitational champion Conference regular season champion Conference regular season and conference tournament champion Division regular season champion Division regular season and conference tournament champion Conference tournament champion

†NCAA canceled 2020 collegiate activities due to the COVID-19 virus.

== See also ==
- Lacrosse in Pennsylvania
