= 1996 Major Indoor Lacrosse League season =

1996 MILL season
- League: Major Indoor Lacrosse League
- Sport: Indoor lacrosse
- Duration: December 30, 1995 - April 12, 1996
- Games: 10
- Teams: 7
- TV partner(s): ESPN and ESPN2

Regular season
- League champions: Buffalo Bandits
- Runners-up: Philadelphia Wings
- Season MVP: Gary Gait (Philadelphia Wings)
- Top scorer: John Tavares (Buffalo Bandits)

Champion's Cup
- Champions: Buffalo Bandits (3rd title)
- Runners-up: Philadelphia Wings
- Finals MVP: Pat O'Toole (Buffalo)

MILL seasons
- ← 1995 season 1997 season →

The 1996 season is the 10th season of the league that began on December 30, 1995, and concluded with the championship game on April 12, 1996.

== Team movement ==
The Charlotte Cobras played their only season in 1996, in the process achieving the only winless season in the history of the league.

=== Teams ===
1996 Major Indoor Lacrosse League
Team	City	Arena	Capacity
Baltimore Thunder	Baltimore, Maryland	Baltimore Arena	10,582
Boston Blazers	Boston, Massachusetts	FleetCenter	17,850
Buffalo Bandits	Buffalo, New York	Buffalo Memorial Auditorium	16,325
Charlotte Cobras	Charlotte, North Carolina	Independence Arena	9,605
New York Saints	Uniondale, New York	Nassau Veterans Memorial Coliseum	16,297
Philadelphia Wings	Philadelphia, Pennsylvania	CoreStates Spectrum	17,380
Rochester Knighthawks	Rochester, New York	Rochester Community War Memorial	10,662

=== Map of teams ===
Major Indoor Lacrosse League Teams

== Regular season ==
P	Team	GP	W	L	PCT	GB	Home	Road	GF	GA	Diff	GF/GP	GA/GP
1	Buffalo Bandits – xyz	10	8	2	.800	0.0	3–2	5–0	173	127	+46	17.30	12.70
2	Philadelphia Wings – x	10	8	2	.800	0.0	4–1	4–1	165	114	+51	16.50	11.40
3	Boston Blazers – x	10	6	4	.600	2.0	4–1	2–3	146	114	+32	14.60	11.40
4	Rochester Knighthawks – x	10	6	4	.600	2.0	4–1	2–3	148	137	+11	14.80	13.70
5	Baltimore Thunder	10	4	6	.400	4.0	3–2	1–4	144	163	−19	14.40	16.30
6	New York Saints	10	3	7	.300	5.0	2–3	1–4	124	144	−20	12.40	14.40
7	Charlotte Cobras	10	0	10	.000	8.0	0–5	0–5	85	186	−101	8.50	18.60

x: Clinched playoff berth; c: Clinched playoff berth by crossing over to another division; y: Clinched division; z: Clinched best regular season record; GP: Games Played
W: Wins; L: Losses; GB: Games back; PCT: Win percentage; Home: Record at Home; Road: Record on the Road; GF: Goals scored; GA: Goals allowed
Differential: Difference between goals scored and allowed; GF/GP: Average number of goals scored per game; GA/GP: Average number of goals allowed per game

== All Star Game ==
No All-Star Game was played in 1996.

== Playoffs ==
Semifinals
4	Rochester	10
1	Buffalo	18
3	Boston	8
2	Philadelphia	10

Championship
2	Philadelphia	10
1	Buffalo	15

== Awards ==
Award	Winner	Team
MVP Award	Gary Gait	Philadelphia
Rookie of the Year Award	Darren Fridge	Boston
Championship Game MVP	Pat O'Toole	Buffalo

=== Weekly awards ===
Each week, a player is awarded "Player of the Week" honours.

Week	Player of the Week
1	J.J. Pearl
2	Steve Dietrich
3	Gary Gait
4	Tom Phair
5	Darren Fridge
6	Andy Piazza
7	John Tavares
8	Eric Seremet
9	Dallas Eliuk
10	John Tavares
11	John Tavares
12	Steve Dietrich
13	Charlie Blanchard
14	Kevin Bilger

=== Monthly awards ===
An award is also given out monthly for the best overall player.

Month	Player of the Month
Jan	Gary Gait
Feb	John Tavares
Mar	John Tavares

=== All-Pro Teams ===
First Team:

- Gary Gait, Philadelphia
- Paul Gait, Rochester
- Tom Marechek, Philadelphia
- John Tavares, Buffalo
- Jim Veltman, Buffalo
- Dallas Eliuk, Philadelphia (goalie)

Second Team:

- Chris Bates, Charlotte
- Thomas Carmean, Boston
- Chris Driscoll, Rochester
- Kevin Finneran, Philadelphia
- Duane Jacobs, Rochester
- Steve Dietrich, Rochester (goalie)

== Statistics leaders ==
Bold numbers indicate new single-season records. Italics indicate tied single-season records.

Stat	Player	Team	Number
Goals	Gary Gait	Philadelphia	43
Assists	Jim Veltman	Buffalo	**40**
Points	John Tavares	Buffalo	**81**
Penalty Minutes	Tom Phair	Buffalo	**53**
Shots on Goal	Gary Gait	Philadelphia	**126**
Loose Balls	Jim Veltman	Buffalo	125
Save Pct	Pat O'Toole	Buffalo	76.3

== Attendance ==
=== Regular season ===
Home team	Home games	Average attendance	Total attendance
Buffalo Bandits	5	14,883	74,419
Philadelphia Wings	5	14,644	73,222
Boston Blazers	5	8,358	41,792
New York Saints	5	7,916	39,579
Rochester Knighthawks	5	7,376	36,881
Baltimore Thunder	5	4,987	24,934
Charlotte Cobras	5	2,760	13,802
**League**	**35**	**7,991**	**279,695**

=== Playoffs ===
Home team	Home games	Average attendance	Total attendance
Buffalo Bandits	2	15,333	30,665
Philadelphia Wings	1	12,092	12,092
**League**	**3**	**14,252**	**42,757**

== See also ==
- 1996 in sports
