= Langley Thunder =

Canadian box lacrosse team

- Founded: 1994
- League: Western Lacrosse Association
- Based in: Langley, British Columbia
- Arena: Langley Events Centre
- Colours: Black, blue, white
- Head coach: Curt Malawsky
- Championships: Western Lacrosse Association: (3) 2011, 2012, 2022
- Website: https://www.langleythunder.com

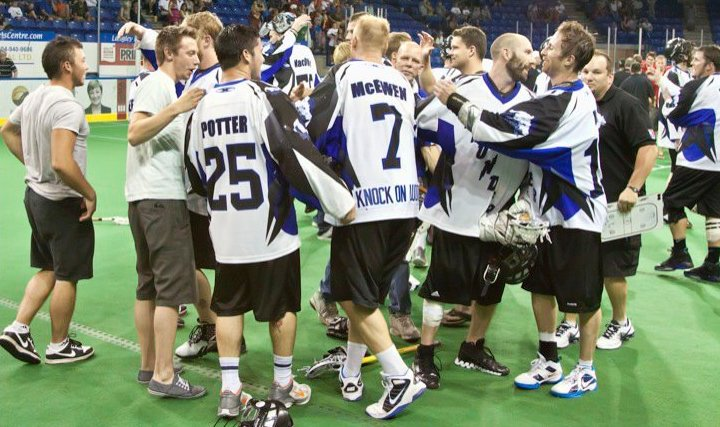
2011 Langley Thunder after winning the WLA championship

The Langley Thunder are a Senior A box lacrosse team, based in Langley, British Columbia, Canada. The team competes in the 7-team Western Lacrosse Association (WLA), playing their home games at the 5,276 capacity Langley Events Centre, the largest arena in the league.

The Thunder won back-to-back WLA Championships in the 2011 and 2012 seasons. Notable Thunder players include Athan Iannucci, Alex Turner, and Matt Leveque.

The Langley Thunder hosted the Mann Cup in September 2011 at the Langley Events Centre where they played the Brampton Excelsiors, losing the series 4–1 to the visitors.

The Langley Junior Thunder of the BC Junior A Lacrosse League and the Langley Intermediate Thunder also play at the LEC, operating under the same management as the WLA Thunder.

== All-time record ==
| Season | Team name | Games | Win | Losses | Tie | GF | GA | Points | Playoffs |
|---|---|---|---|---|---|---|---|---|---|
| 1994 | North Shore Indians | 20 | 5 | 15 | 0 | 189 | 234 | 10 | Did Not Qualify |
| 1995 | North Shore Indians | 25 | 7 | 13 | 5 | 214 | 247 | 19 | Did Not Qualify |
| 1996 | North Shore Indians | 20 | 12 | 7 | 1 | 204 | 184 | 25 | Defeated in Finals |
| 1997 | North Shore Indians | 20 | 11 | 9 | 0 | 231 | 174 | 22 | Defeated in Finals |
| 1998 | North Shore Indians | 25 | 13 | 11 | 1 | 245 | 233 | 27 | Defeated in Semi-Finals |
| 1999 | North Shore Indians | 25 | 10 | 14 | 1 | 213 | 241 | 21 | Defeated in Semi-Finals |
| 2000 | Okanagan Thunder | 25 | 5 | 19 | 1 | 298 | 375 | 11 | Did Not Qualify |
| 2001 | Okanagan Thunder | 20 | 5 | 15 | 0 | 223 | 274 | 10 | Did Not Qualify |
| 2002 | North Shore Thunder | 20 | 4 | 15 | 1 | 196 | 260 | 9 | Did Not Qualify |
| 2003 | North Shore Thunder | 20 | 7 | 11 | 2 | 217 | 245 | 16 | Defeated in Semi-Finals |
| 2004 | Langley Thunder | 20 | 1 | 19 | 0 | 146 | 254 | 2 | Did Not Qualify |
| 2005 | Langley Thunder | 17 | 2 | 15 | 0 | 227 | 439 | 4 | Did Not Qualify |
| 2006 | Langley Thunder | 18 | 2 | 16 | 0 | 138 | 501 | 4 | Did Not Qualify |
| 2007 | Langley Thunder | 18 | 6 | 12 | 0 | 176 | 199 | 12 | Did Not Qualify |
| 2008 | Langley Thunder | 18 | 3 | 15 | 0 | 156 | 173 | 6 | Did Not Qualify |
| 2009 | Langley Thunder | 18 | 10 | 7 | 1 | 188 | 163 | 21 | Defeated in Semi-Finals |
| 2010 | Langley Thunder | 18 | 6 | 12 | 0 | 184 | 198 | 12 | Did Not Qualify |
| 2011 | Langley Thunder | 18 | 8 | 8 | 2 | 161 | 168 | 18 | Defeated in Mann Cup |
| 2012 | Langley Thunder | 18 | 12 | 6 | 0 | 177 | 161 | 24 | Defeated in Mann Cup |
| 2013 | Langley Thunder | 18 | 11 | 5 | 2 | 157 | 137 | 24 | Defeated in Finals |
| 2014 | Langley Thunder | 18 | 7 | 11 | 0 | 138 | 163 | 14 | Did Not Qualify |
| 2015 | Langley Thunder | 18 | 9 | 9 | 0 | 163 | 160 | 18 | Defeated in Semi-Finals |
| 2016 | Langley Thunder | 18 | 3 | 15 | 0 | 111 | 191 | 6 | Did Not Qualify |
| 2017 | Langley Thunder | 18 | 4 | 14 | 0 | 131 | 182 | 8 | Did Not Qualify |
| 2018 | Langley Thunder | 18 | 7 | 10 | 1 | 183 | 205 | 15 | Did Not Qualify |
| 2019 | Langley Thunder | 18 | 4 | 14 | 0 | 136 | 194 | 8 | Did Not Qualify |
| 2020 | Season cancelled | | | | | | | | |
| 2021 | Season cancelled | | | | | | | | |
| 2022 | Langley Thunder | 18 | 12 | 6 | 0 | 185 | 160 | 24 | Defeated in Mann Cup |
| 2023 | Langley Thunder | 18 | 14 | 4 | 0 | 193 | 143 | 28 | Defeated in Finals |
| 2024 | Langley Thunder | 18 | 8 | 9 | 1 | 162 | 173 | 17 | Defeated in Finals |
| 2025 | Langley Thunder | 18 | 5 | 13 | 0 | 136 | 194 | 10 | Did Not Qualify |
| 2026 | Langley Thunder | 18 | 4 | 14 | 0 | 129 | 184 | 8 | Did Not Qualify |

== History ==
The Thunder were founded as the North Shore Indians in 1994. This team was a reborn version of earlier indigenous teams who played under the banner of the 'Indians'. After playing for 5 years in North Vancouver, they were transferred to Kelowna, the first time a WLA team had left the Lower Mainland/Vancouver Island area since the Portland experiment in 1968, and were renamed the Thunder. The Kelowna stay only lasted two years, before they returned back to the North Shore. Another short, two year stay in North Vancouver ended when they moved once again to Langley, where they have played the last 21 years. The Thunder moved into the Langley Events Centre when it opened in 2009.

The Thunder have made 3 Mann Cups in franchise history, but have failed to win any. They are one of six Senior A teams to have never won the national championship.

== Jr A Thunder ==
The Langley Jr A Thunder play in the BCJALL, the highest tier of junior lacrosse in BC. Originally founded as the South Fraser Stickmen, they played in Surrey for 19 years before moving to Langley to become the Thunder's junior outfit. They are yet to qualify for the Minto Cup

== Gallery ==
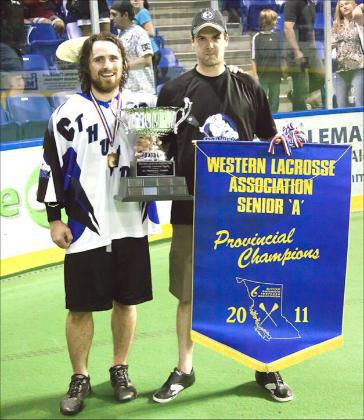
Captain Matt Leveque & Owner Rob Buchan

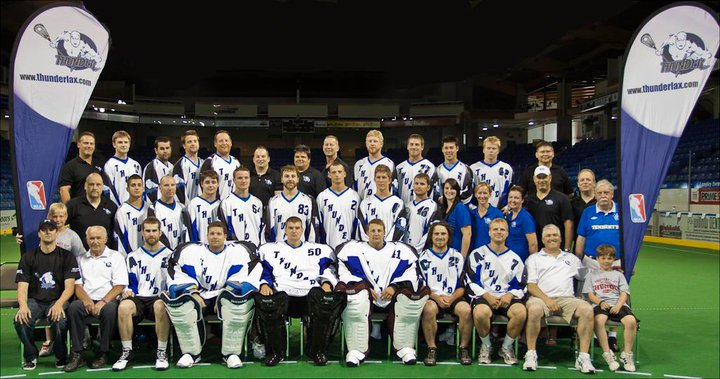
2011 Langley Thunder
