= BC Junior A Lacrosse League =

- British Columbia Junior A Lacrosse League
- Formerly: Inter-City Junior A Lacrosse League
- Sport: Box Lacrosse
- Founded: 1937
- Commissioner: Karl Christiansen
- No. of teams: 8
- Country: Canada
- Most recent champion: Coquitlam Adanacs
- Website: www.bcjall.com

The British Columbia Junior A Lacrosse League is a junior box lacrosse league based in British Columbia, Canada. The BCJALL is one of three leagues that constitute as Junior A within the Canadian Lacrosse Association as the highest level of junior, ages 16 to 21 years old, box lacrosse in Canada. The BCJALL currently consists of eight (8) teams located throughout the Lower Mainland (6) and Vancouver Island (2). Regular Season play begins the last week of April through to the first week of July. Teams compete annually for the British Columbia Provincial Championship, with the winner moving on to play for the Minto Cup, the Canadian National Championship.

== History ==
- Inter-City Junior A Lacrosse League (1955-1969)
- Junior A Lacrosse League (1970-1971)
- Pacific Junior A Lacrosse League (1972-1974)
- West Canada Major Junior Lacrosse League (1975-1982)
- British Columbia Junior A Lacrosse League (1983-Present)

== Teams ==
Current

Team	City	Arena	Capacity
Burnaby Lakers	Burnaby, British Columbia, Canada	Bill Copeland Sports Centre	2,000
Coquitlam Adanacs	Coquitlam, British Columbia, Canada	Poirier Sport & Leisure Complex	2,200
Delta Islanders	Ladner, British Columbia, Canada	Ladner Leisure Center	1,800
Langley Thunder	Langley, British Columbia, Canada	Langley Events Centre	5,276
Nanaimo Timbermen	Nanaimo, British Columbia, Canada	Nanaimo Ice Centre	300
New Westminster Salmonbellies	New Westminster, British Columbia, Canada	Queen's Park Arena	3,500
Port Coquitlam Saints	Port Coquitlam, British Columbia, Canada	Port Coquitlam Recreation Complex	1,000
Victoria Shamrocks	Victoria, British Columbia, Canada	The Q Centre	2,781

Former

- Edmonton Outlaws - in 1987 played a 12-game BCJALL schedule, playing each team twice
- South Fraser Stickmen (1983-2001) → Surrey Stickmen (2002-2007) → South Fraser Stickmen (2008) → Langley
- Richmond Roadrunners (1972-1992)

Potential

== Player eligibility ==
New players enter the league annually through the BCJALL Midget Draft. Teams select minor lacrosse players throughout British Columbia who are in their second year of midget lacrosse, 15 or 16 years old. The order of selection depends on the final standings of the teams in the prior regular season. The last place team selects first, the second to last will choose second, and so on. Players aged 16–21 are eligible to play in the BCJALL. There is no limit to the amount of 21-year-olds on a teams rosters. Each team is permitted to carry only two non-British Columbian players.

== League Champions ==
Season	Champion	Runner-Up	Series
1955	Victoria Shamrocks	New Westminster Salmonbellies	2-1
1956	Mount Pleasant No.177 Legionnaires	New Westminster Salmonbellies	2-0
1957	Victoria Shamrocks	Mount Pleasant Legion	28-6
1958	New Westminster Salmonbellies	Vancouver Rockies	21-5
1959	New Westminster Salmonbellies	Vancouver Lobbans Florists	3-0
1960	New Westminster Salmonbellies	Vancouver Lobbans Florists	3-0
1961	Burnaby Norburn Athletic Club	New Westminster Pastimes	
1962	Victoria Shamrocks	South Vancouver Legion	3-2
1963	Victoria Shamrocks	South Vancouver Legion	3-2
1964	New Westminster Salmonbellies	Victoria Shamrocks	3-1
1965	New Westminster Salmonbellies	Victoria Shamrocks	3-1
1966	New Westminster Salmonbellies	Burnaby Norburns	3-0
1967	New Westminster Salmonbellies	Burnaby Norburns	
1968	South Vancouver Legion	Victoria Shamrocks	2-1
1969	South Vancouver Legion	Coquitlam J-Hawks	12-10
1970	Burnaby Cablevision	Coquitlam J-Hawks	4-2
1971	Richmond Roadrunners	Burnaby Cablevision	4-3
1972	Richmond Roadrunners	Victoria MacDonald's Bread	4-2
1973	Richmond Roadrunners	Victoria MacDonald's Bread	4-1
1974	Burnaby Cablevision	Richmond Roadrunners	4-1
1975	Burnaby Cablevision	Victoria MacDonald's Bread	4-3
1976	Victoria MacDonald's Bread	Burnaby Cablevision	4-3
1977	Burnaby Cablevision	New Westminster Salmonbellies	
1978	Burnaby Cablevision	New Westminster Salmonbellies	
1979	Burnaby Cablevision	New Westminster Salmonbellies	
1980	New Westminster Salmonbellies	Burnaby Cablevision	
1981	Burnaby Cablevision	New Westminster Salmonbellies	4-1
1982	Victoria Esquimalt Legion	Coquitlam Adanacs	4-3
1983	New Westminster Salmonbellies	Burnaby Cablevision	3-0
1984	New Westminster Salmonbellies	Burnaby Cablevision	3-0
1985	Victoria Esquimalt Legion	Burnaby Cablevision	4-2
1986	Victoria Esquimalt Legion	Coquitlam Adanacs	3-0
1987	Victoria Esquimalt Legion	Coquitlam Adanacs	3-0
1988	Victoria Esquimalt Legion	Coquitlam Adanacs	2-0
1989	Richmond Outlaws	Coquitlam Adanacs	
1990	Richmond Outlaws	Victoria Esquimalt Legion	
1991	Victoria Eagles	Coquitlam Adanacs	
1992	Coquitlam Adanacs	South Fraser Stickmen	
1993	Coquitlam Adanacs	New Westminster Salmonbellies	
1994	New Westminster Salmonbellies	Coquitlam Adanacs	4-1
1995	New Westminster Salmonbellies	South Fraser Stickmen	4-2
1996	Burnaby Lakers	New Westminster Salmonbellies	4-1
1997	Burnaby Lakers	Port Coquitlam Saints	
1998	Burnaby Lakers	Port Coquitlam Saints	
1999	Burnaby Lakers	Victoria Shamrocks	4-2
2000	Burnaby Lakers	Victoria Shamrocks	4-3
2001	Burnaby Lakers	Victoria Shamrocks	4-1
2002	Burnaby Lakers	Victoria Shamrocks	4-0
2003	Burnaby Lakers	Victoria Shamrocks	3-2
2004	Burnaby Lakers	Victoria Shamrocks	3-0
2005	Burnaby Lakers	Surrey Stickmen	3-0
2006	Burnaby Lakers	Port Coquitlam Saints	3-0
2007	Burnaby Lakers	Coquitlam Adanacs	3-1
2008	Victoria Shamrocks	Burnaby Lakers	3-2
2009	Coquitlam Adanacs	New Westminster Salmonbellies	4-2
2010	Coquitlam Adanacs	New Westminster Salmonbellies	4-1
2011	Coquitlam Adanacs	New Westminster Salmonbellies	4-1
2012	Coquitlam Adanacs	Delta Islanders	4-1
2013	Coquitlam Adanacs	New Westminster Salmonbellies	3-2
2014	Coquitlam Adanacs	New Westminster Salmonbellies	4-3
2015	Coquitlam Adanacs	Delta Islanders	4-0
2016	Delta Islanders	Coquitlam Adanacs	2-1
2017	Coquitlam Adanacs	New Westminster Salmonbellies	4-1
2018	Coquitlam Adanacs	New Westminster Salmonbellies	4-2
2019	Coquitlam Adanacs	Victoria Shamrocks	2-0
2020	season cancelled		
2021 (Mainland)	Coquitlam Adanacs	Burnaby Lakers	3-1
2021 (Island)	Nanaimo Timbermen	Victoria Shamrocks	2-0
2022	Victoria Shamrocks	Langley Thunder	4-2
2023	Coquitlam Adanacs	Victoria Shamrocks	4-1
2024	Coquitlam Adanacs	Port Coquitlam Saints	3-0
2025	Coquitlam Adanacs	Victoria Shamrocks	4-2
2026	Victoria Shamrocks	Coquitlam Adanacs	4-2

== Minto Cup ==
=== Champions ===
The Minto Cup has been captured by a BCJALL team 11 times since the league's reformation in 1983

Year	Champion	Finalist	Series/Score
1988	Victoria-Esquimalt Legion (BC)	Coquitlam Adanacs (BC)	2-0 gms
1994	New Westminster Salmonbellies (BC)	Brampton Excelsiors (ON)	4-3 gms
1998	Burnaby Lakers (BC)	Six Nations Arrows (ON)	4-1 gms
2000	Burnaby Lakers (BC)	Orangeville Northmen (ON)	4-2 gms
2002	Burnaby Lakers (BC)	St. Catharines Athletics (ON)	4-2 gms
2004	Burnaby Lakers (BC)	Victoria Shamrocks (BC)	2-0 gms
2005	Burnaby Lakers (BC)	Six Nations Arrows (ON)	2-1 gms
2010	Coquitlam Adanacs (BC)	Orangeville Northmen (ON)	2-0 gms
2016	Coquitlam Adanacs (BC)	Orangeville Northmen (ON)	3-2 gms
2018	Coquitlam Adanacs (BC)	Brampton Excelsiors (ON)	3-1 gms
2024	Coquitlam Adanacs (BC)	Orangeville Northmen (ON)	2-0 gms
2025	Coquitlam Adanacs (BC)	Orangeville Northmen (ON)	2-0 gms

The Minto Cup was also won 12 times by teams from British Columbia between 1948 and 1988:

Year	Champion	Finalist	Series/Score
1948	Vancouver Burrards (BC)	St. Catharines Athletics (ON)	3-2 gms
1949	Vancouver Norburn Eagletime (BC)	Ontario All-Stars (ON)	3-1 gms
1953	New Westminster Salmonacs (BC)	Long Branch Monarchs	3-2 gms
1954	Vancouver PNE Junior Indians (BC)	Manitoba All-Stars (MB)	3-0 gms
1956	Mount Pleasant No.177 Legionnaires (BC)	Brampton Excelsiors (ON)	4-0 gms
1960	New Westminster Salmonbellies (BC)	Whitby Red Wings (ON)	4-1 gms
1962	Victoria Shamrocks (BC)	Brampton Armstrongs (ON)	4-2 gms
1971	Richmond Roadrunners (BC)	Peterborough PCO's (ON)	4-3 gms
1976	Victoria MacDonalds (BC)	Brampton Excelsiors (ON)	4-0 gms
1977	Burnaby Cablevision (BC)	Whitby CBC Builders (ON)	4-2 gms
1978	Burnaby Cablevision (BC)	Whitby CBC Builders (ON)	4-1 gms
1979	Burnaby Cablevision (BC)	Peterborough Gray-Munros (ON)	8-6

British Columbian teams saw some success between 1901 and 1909 when the Minto Cup was played for as the Canadian Senior National Championship, New Westminster Salmonbellies winning in 1908 and 1909. As the Canadian Professional Championship, the West dominated the Minto Cup, never relenting between 1910 and 1924. The Salmonbellies winning nine and Vancouver winning three as the Vancouver Lacrosse Club, Vancouver Greenshirts, and Vancouver Terminals.

== Records and awards ==
Individual records

- Most Goals in a Season: 115, Kevin Alexander 1975
- Most Assists in a Season: 118, Dan Wilson 1977
- Most Points in a Season: 217, Kevin Alexander 1976
- Most Penalty Minutes in a Season: 196, Jame Harding 1998
- Most Short Handed Goals in a Season: 18, Brad Dickson 1990
- Most Points in a Season, Rookie:
- Most Sock-Tricks (6 G/GM) in a Season:
- Most Goals in a Single Game:

Team records

- Most Wins in a Season:
- Most Wins in an Inaugural Season:
- Most Points in a Season:
- Most Goals in a Season:
- Fewest Goals Against in a Season:
- Most Power Play Goals in a Season:

Annual awards

- Bill Dickinson Trophy - Scoring Champion: 2013, Cody Nass (Delta Islanders/New Westminster Salmonbellies)
- Delmonico Trophy - Most Valuable Player: 2013, Cody Nass (Delta Islanders/New Westminster Salmonbellies)
- Monty Leahy Memorial Trophy - Top Goal Tender: 2013, Davide DiRuscio (Coquitlam Adanacs)
- Marholis Gilson Award - Rookie of the Year: 2013, Cody Nass (Delta Islanders/New Westminster Salmonbellies)
- Keith McEachren Trophy - Most Sportsmanlike Player: 2013, Brandon Bull (Langley Thunder)
- John Urban Award - Graduating Player Award: 2013, Chris Wardle (Victoria Shamrocks)
- Al Boles Memorial Trophy - Most Inspirational Player: 2013, Peter Dubenski (Nanaimo Timbermen)
- Doug Hazelwood Memorial Trophy - Coach of the Year: 2013, Neil Doddridge (Coquitlam Junior Adanacs)
