= Matt Shearer =

Canadian lacrosse player

- Born: October 19, 1973 (age 51); Whitby, Ontario, CA
- Shoots: Right
- Position: Forward
- NLL draft: 1st overall, 1997; Baltimore Thunder
- NLL teams: Toronto Rock; Colorado Mammoth; New York Saints; Washington Power; Pittsburgh CrosseFire; Baltimore Thunder
- Pro career: 1998–2007
- Nickname: The Sniper

Matt Shearer (born October 19, 1973, in Whitby, Ontario) is a retired lacrosse player. Shearer retired after the 2007 NLL season following a ten-year career in the National Lacrosse League.

== Statistics ==
=== NLL ===
Matt Shearer		Regular Season									Playoffs								
Season	Team	GP	G	A	Pts	LB	PIM	Pts/GP	LB/GP	PIM/GP	GP	G	A	Pts	LB	PIM	Pts/GP	LB/GP	PIM/GP
1998	Baltimore Thunder	9	11	6	17	34	2	1.89	3.78	0.22	3	5	3	8	7	0	2.67	2.33	0.00
1999	Baltimore Thunder	10	27	14	41	42	6	4.10	4.20	0.60	–	–	–	–	–	–	–	–	–
2000	Pittsburgh CrosseFire	12	19	19	38	56	11	3.17	4.67	0.92	–	–	–	–	–	–	–	–	–
2001	Washington Power	14	26	26	52	40	8	3.71	2.86	0.57	1	1	0	1	3	0	1.00	3.00	0.00
2002	Washington Power	16	31	28	59	79	13	3.69	4.94	0.81	2	1	1	2	14	0	1.00	7.00	0.00
2003	Colorado Mammoth	1	1	0	1	0	2	1.00	0.00	2.00	–	–	–	–	–	–	–	–	–
2003	New York Saints	10	28	20	48	46	2	4.80	4.60	0.20	–	–	–	–	–	–	–	–	–
2004	Toronto Rock	12	26	18	44	32	6	3.67	2.67	0.50	1	0	2	2	3	0	2.00	3.00	0.00
2005	Toronto Rock	13	17	21	38	39	0	2.92	3.00	0.00	1	2	1	3	6	0	3.00	6.00	0.00
2006	Toronto Rock	9	11	10	21	24	0	2.33	2.67	0.00	1	3	0	3	3	0	3.00	3.00	0.00
2007	Toronto Rock	9	9	10	19	19	4	2.11	2.11	0.44	–	–	–	–	–	–	–	–	–
		115	206	172	378	411	54	3.29	3.57	0.47	9	12	7	19	36	0	2.11	4.00	0.00
Career Total:		124	218	179	397	447	54	3.20	3.60	0.44									

GP–Games played; G–Goals; A–Assists; Pts–Points; LB–Loose balls; PIM–Penalty minutes; Pts/GP–Points per games played; LB/GP–Loose balls per games played; PIM/GP–Penalty minutes per games played.

== College ==
Shearer played one season at Loyola College where he scored 30 goals and had 15 assists in 1997.
