= Thomas Carmean =

American lacrosse player and coach

Thomas Carmean is the assistant coach of the Boys' NCAA lacrosse team at Keene State College in New Hampshire. Carmean is the former Guilford College Men's Lacrosse Team, a lacrosse alumnus of the University of Massachusetts Amherst, and a former player for the Boston Blazers, New York Saints and Bridgeport Barrage, He is an inductee of the US Lacrosse Hall of Fame, New England Chapter. He coached at Amherst College from 2000 through 2010 and was named the head men's lacrosse at Guilford College on June 2, 2010. Carmean Was named assistant coach of the Keene State Owls in 2022.

In 2007, Carmean received accolades in an article where he was listed as one of the three best American-born attackmen to have ever played the game. The article noted that Carmean was a "fantastic athlete with a lightning fast split dodge and a competitive spirit that never quit.

== University of Massachusetts Lacrosse (1984–1987) ==
Tom was a starting attackman for the Minutemen for all four of his years at the University of Massachusetts. He earned All-American honors two times in his career and led his team to Division I NCAA men's lacrosse tournament appearances in 1986 and 1987.

== Professional Lacrosse Career ==
Tom went on to play in the Major Indoor Lacrosse League (MILL) as an attackman. He had a successful career and was nominated Second Team All-Pro for five straight seasons from 1993 to 1997. Tom was also awarded team MVP three years in a row with two different teams. Once with New England in 1991 and twice with Boston from 1992 to 1993.
