= Boston Blazers (1992–1997) =

- Sport: Box lacrosse
- First season: 1992
- Disbanded: 1997
- League: Major Indoor Lacrosse League
- Division: National
- Team history: New England Blazers (1989–1991)
- Location: Boston, Massachusetts
- Arena: Boston Garden (1992–1995); FleetCenter (1996–1997)
- Colors: Green, Orange, Black
- Championships: 0
- Formerly: New England Blazers

The Boston Blazers were a member of the Major Indoor Lacrosse League from 1989 to 1997. They were called the New England Blazers from 1989 to 1991 while based in Worcester, Massachusetts, and were renamed the Boston Blazers in 1992 when they moved to Boston. While in Worcester, the Blazers played at the Worcester Centrum. In Boston, they played at the Boston Garden from 1992–1995 and then moved to the FleetCenter in 1996 and played there until 1997.

A separate franchise, also known as the Boston Blazers, was founded in 2007 and played in the National Lacrosse League from 2009 to 2013. While the name of the new team was chosen "in part due to the popularity and nostalgia associated with the former Boston Blazers franchise" it did not share any lineage with the MILL Blazers.

== Awards and honors ==
Year	Player	Award
1996	Darren Fridge	Rookie of the Year
1997	Jeff Wilfong	Rookie of the Year

== All time record ==
Season	Division	W-L	Finish	Home	Road	GF	GA	Coach	Playoffs
1992	National	3–5	3rd	2–2	1–3	101	116	Ron Fraser	Lost in division semifinals
1993	National	2–6	3rd	2–2	0–4	93	108	Ron Fraser	Lost in division finals
1994	National	4–4	3rd	1–3	3–1	93	91	Ron Fraser	Missed playoffs
1995		5–3	2nd	2–2	3–1	93	91	Ron Fraser	Lost in semifinals
1996		6–4	3rd	4–1	2–3	146	113	Ron Fraser	Lost in semifinals
1997		4–6	5th	3–2	1–4	120	135	Ron Fraser	Missed playoffs
Total	6 seasons	24–28		14–12	10–16	646	654		

== Playoff results ==
Season	Game	Visiting	Home
1992	Division Semifinals	Boston 16	Buffalo 22
1993	Division Semifinals	Detroit 5	Boston 18
1993	Division Finals	Boston 10	Buffalo 12
1995	Semifinals	Boston 8	Rochester 10
1996	Semifinals	Boston 8	Philadelphia 10
