= 2020 Saskatchewan Rush season =

2020 Saskatchewan Rush
- League: NLL
- Division: West
- 2020 record: 7-3
- Home record: 2-3
- Road record: 5-0
- Goals for: 111
- Goals against: 93
- General Manager: Derek Keenan
- Coach: Jeff McComb
- Captain: Chris Corbeil
- Alternate captains: Mark Matthews; Kyle Rubisch
- Arena: SaskTel Centre

The Saskatchewan Rush are a lacrosse team based in Saskatoon, Saskatchewan, playing in the National Lacrosse League (NLL). The 2020 season is the 15th in franchise history, 5th in Saskatchewan. Due to the COVID-19 pandemic, the season was suspended on March 12, 2020. On April 8, the league made a further public statement announcing the cancellation of the remaining games of the 2020 season and that they would be exploring options for playoffs once it was safe to resume play.

On June 4, the league confirmed that the playoffs would also be cancelled due to the pandemic.

== Current standings ==
North Division
P	Team	GP	W	L	PCT	GB	Home	Road	GF	GA	Diff	GF/GP	GA/GP
1	Halifax Thunderbirds	12	8	4	.667	0.0	6–1	2–3	139	126	+13	11.58	10.50
2	Toronto Rock	11	7	4	.636	0.5	4–2	3–2	122	106	+16	11.09	9.64
3	Buffalo Bandits	11	7	4	.636	0.5	4–2	3–2	130	118	+12	11.82	10.73
4	Rochester Knighthawks	12	2	10	.167	6.0	2–3	0–7	115	165	−50	9.58	13.75

East Division
P	Team	GP	W	L	PCT	GB	Home	Road	GF	GA	Diff	GF/GP	GA/GP
1	New England Black Wolves	11	8	3	.727	0.0	4–3	4–0	135	101	+34	12.27	9.18
2	Georgia Swarm	12	7	5	.583	1.5	2–4	5–1	149	126	+23	12.42	10.50
3	Philadelphia Wings	14	8	6	.571	1.5	3–3	5–3	151	134	+17	10.79	9.57
4	New York Riptide	13	1	12	.077	8.0	1–5	0–7	116	177	−61	8.92	13.62

West Division
P	Team	GP	W	L	PCT	GB	Home	Road	GF	GA	Diff	GF/GP	GA/GP
1	Saskatchewan Rush	10	7	3	.700	0.0	2–3	5–0	111	93	+18	11.10	9.30
2	Colorado Mammoth	13	7	6	.538	1.5	4–2	3–4	128	125	+3	9.85	9.62
3	San Diego Seals	12	6	6	.500	2.0	3–3	3–3	138	131	+7	11.50	10.92
4	Calgary Roughnecks	10	5	5	.500	2.0	1–4	4–1	122	111	+11	12.20	11.10
5	Vancouver Warriors	13	4	9	.308	4.5	2–4	2–5	117	160	−43	9.00	12.31

x: Clinched playoff berth; c: Clinched playoff berth by crossing over to another division; y: Clinched division; z: Clinched best regular season record; GP: Games Played
W: Wins; L: Losses; GB: Games back; PCT: Win percentage; Home: Record at Home; Road: Record on the Road; GF: Goals scored; GA: Goals allowed
Differential: Difference between goals scored and allowed; GF/GP: Average number of goals scored per game; GA/GP: Average number of goals allowed per game

== Game log ==
=== Regular season ===
Game	Date	Opponent	Location	Score	OT	Attendance	Record
1	November 29, 2019	@ Colorado Mammoth	Pepsi Center	W 9–8		12,132	1–0
2	December 14, 2019	New England Black Wolves	SaskTel Centre	L 8–12		11,119	1–1
3	December 28, 2019	@ New York Riptide	Nassau Coliseum	W 11–4		6,089	2–1
4	January 12, 2020	@ San Diego Seals	Pechanga Arena	W 12–9		4,145	3–1
5	January 18, 2020	Colorado Mammoth	SaskTel Centre	L 6–12		12,542	3–2
6	February 8, 2020	Colorado Mammoth	SaskTel Centre	W 9–7		11,982	4–2
7	February 15, 2020	@ Halifax Thunderbirds	Scotiabank Centre	W 16–15	OT	8,833	5–2
8	February 22, 2020	@ Philadelphia Wings	Wells Fargo Center	W 15–10		9,683	6–2
9	February 29, 2020	Toronto Rock	SaskTel Centre	L 8–9		12,764	6–3
10	March 7, 2020	Vancouver Warriors	SaskTel Centre	W 17–7		11,632	7–3

== Cancelled games ==
Game	Date	Opponent	Location	Score	OT	Attendance	Record
11	March 13, 2020	@ Calgary Roughnecks	Scotiabank Saddledome				
12	March 20, 2020	Georgia Swarm	SaskTel Centre				
13	March 28, 2020	@ Buffalo Bandits	KeyBank Center				
14	April 4, 2020	Rochester Knighthawks	SaskTel Centre				
15	April 11, 2020	San Diego Seals	SaskTel Centre				
16	April 17, 2020	@ Calgary Roughnecks	Scotiabank Saddledome				
17	April 18, 2020	Calgary Roughnecks	SaskTel Centre				
18	April 24, 2020	@ Vancouver Warriors	Rogers Arena				

== Current roster ==
Saskatchewan Rush roster
Active (21-man) roster		Inactive roster	Coaches
Goaltenders: 31 (Canada) Adam Shute; 35 (Canada) Evan Kirk; Defensemen: 20 (Canada) Travis Cornwall; 94 (Canada) Matt Hossack; 8 (Canada) Mike Messenger; 4 (Canada) Kyle Rubisch (A); 23 (Canada) Ryan Dilks; 70 (Canada) Holden Garlent; 53 (Canada) Justin Robinson	Forwards: 17 (Canada) Robert Church; 32 (Canada) Matthew Dinsdale; 25 (Canada) Ryan Keenan; 42 (Canada) Mark Matthews (A); 90 (Canada) Ben McIntosh; 3 (Canada) Connor Robinson; 77 (Haudenosaunee) Jeff Shattler; 11 (Canada) Austin Murphy; Transition: 16 (Canada) Chris Corbeil (C); 19 (Canada) Jordi Jones-Smith; 74 (Haudenosaunee) Jeremy Thompson; 13 (Canada) Jeff Cornwall	Practice squad: 12 (Canada) Zach Gould; 88 (Canada) Cameron Dunkerley; 65 (Canada) Ryan McLean; 44 (Australia) Tristan Rai	Head coach: Derek Keenan; Assistant coaches: Jimmy Quinlan - Offensive Coach; Jeremy Tallevi - Defensive Coach; Legend: * Suspended list; (C) Captain; (A) Alternate captain; Roster updated 2019-04-18; NLL Transactions
