= 2020 Halifax Thunderbirds season =

2020 Halifax Thunderbirds
- League: NLL
- Division: North
- 2020 record: 8-4
- Home record: 6-1
- Road record: 2-3
- Goals for: 139
- Goals against: 126
- General Manager: Curt Styres
- Coach: Mike Accursi
- Arena: Scotiabank Centre

The Halifax Thunderbirds are a lacrosse team based in Halifax, Nova Scotia, that plays in the National Lacrosse League (NLL). the 2020 NLL season was their first season the NLL. They were formerly the Rochester Knighthawks but moved to Halifax, as Rochester gained an expansion franchise. Due to the COVID-19 pandemic, the season was suspended on March 12, 2020. On April 8, the league made a further public statement announcing the cancellation of the remaining games of the 2020 season and that they would be exploring options for playoffs once it was safe to resume play.

On June 4, the league confirmed that the playoffs would also be cancelled due to the pandemic.

== Regular season ==
=== Final standings ===
North Division
P	Team	GP	W	L	PCT	GB	Home	Road	GF	GA	Diff	GF/GP	GA/GP
1	Halifax Thunderbirds	12	8	4	.667	0.0	6–1	2–3	139	126	+13	11.58	10.50
2	Toronto Rock	11	7	4	.636	0.5	4–2	3–2	122	106	+16	11.09	9.64
3	Buffalo Bandits	11	7	4	.636	0.5	4–2	3–2	130	118	+12	11.82	10.73
4	Rochester Knighthawks	12	2	10	.167	6.0	2–3	0–7	115	165	−50	9.58	13.75

East Division
P	Team	GP	W	L	PCT	GB	Home	Road	GF	GA	Diff	GF/GP	GA/GP
1	New England Black Wolves	11	8	3	.727	0.0	4–3	4–0	135	101	+34	12.27	9.18
2	Georgia Swarm	12	7	5	.583	1.5	2–4	5–1	149	126	+23	12.42	10.50
3	Philadelphia Wings	14	8	6	.571	1.5	3–3	5–3	151	134	+17	10.79	9.57
4	New York Riptide	13	1	12	.077	8.0	1–5	0–7	116	177	−61	8.92	13.62

West Division
P	Team	GP	W	L	PCT	GB	Home	Road	GF	GA	Diff	GF/GP	GA/GP
1	Saskatchewan Rush	10	7	3	.700	0.0	2–3	5–0	111	93	+18	11.10	9.30
2	Colorado Mammoth	13	7	6	.538	1.5	4–2	3–4	128	125	+3	9.85	9.62
3	San Diego Seals	12	6	6	.500	2.0	3–3	3–3	138	131	+7	11.50	10.92
4	Calgary Roughnecks	10	5	5	.500	2.0	1–4	4–1	122	111	+11	12.20	11.10
5	Vancouver Warriors	13	4	9	.308	4.5	2–4	2–5	117	160	−43	9.00	12.31

x: Clinched playoff berth; c: Clinched playoff berth by crossing over to another division; y: Clinched division; z: Clinched best regular season record; GP: Games Played
W: Wins; L: Losses; GB: Games back; PCT: Win percentage; Home: Record at Home; Road: Record on the Road; GF: Goals scored; GA: Goals allowed
Differential: Difference between goals scored and allowed; GF/GP: Average number of goals scored per game; GA/GP: Average number of goals allowed per game

== Game log ==
Game	Date	Opponent	Location	Score	OT	Attendance	Record
1	December 7, 2019	New York Riptide	Scotiabank Centre	W 12–4		6,847	1–0
2	December 21, 2019	Rochester Knighthawks	Scotiabank Centre	W 14–12		5,278	2–0
3	December 28, 2019	@ Buffalo Bandits	KeyBank Center	W 15–10		13,576	3–0
4	January 11, 2020	Colorado Mammoth	Scotiabank Centre	W 12–9		7,623	4–0
5	January 18, 2020	San Diego Seals	Scotiabank Centre	W 8–5		7,219	5–0
6	January 25, 2020	@ Calgary Roughnecks	Scotiabank Saddledome	W 15–12		15,362	6–0
7	January 31, 2020	@ Toronto Rock	Air Canada Centre	L 9–12		10,946	6–1
8	February 15, 2020	Saskatchewan Rush	Scotiabank Centre	L 15–16	OT	8,833	6–2
9	February 21, 2020	Toronto Rock	Scotiabank Centre	W 9–8		9,337	7–2
10	February 29, 2020	@ Buffalo Bandits	KeyBank Center	L 9–13		12,813	7–3
11	March 1, 2020	@ New England Black Wolves	Mohegan Sun Arena	L 10–16		5,502	7–4
12	March 8, 2020	Buffalo Bandits	Scotiabank Centre	W 11–9		8,359	8–4

== Cancelled games ==
Game	Date	Opponent	Location	Score	OT	Attendance	Record
13	March 14, 2020	@ Rochester Knighthawks	Blue Cross Arena				
14	March 28, 2020	@ Rochester Knighthawks	Blue Cross Arena				
15	April 3, 2020	@ Vancouver Warriors	Rogers Arena				
16	April 18, 2020	Philadelphia Wings	Scotiabank Centre				
17	April 19, 2020	@ Georgia Swarm	Infinite Energy Arena				
18	April 25, 2020	Toronto Rock	Scotiabank Centre				

== Roster ==
Goaltenders

- 35 (Czech Republic) Peter Dubenski
- 76 (Haudenosaunee) Warren Hill

Defenseman

- 4 (Canada) Graeme Hossack
- 18 (Canada) Jake Withers
- 19 (Haudenosaunee) Nonkon Thompson
- 25 (Canada) James Barclay
- 34 (United States) Cory Becker
- 37 (Canada) Scott Campbell
- 45 (Canada) Luc Magnan
- 68 (Canada) Trevor Smyth

Forwards

- 7 (Canada) Eric Fannell
- 16 (Canada) Mike Burke
- 17 (Canada) Ryan Benesch
- 21 (Canada) Chris Boushy
- 24 (Canada) Clarke Petterson
- 28 (Republic of Ireland) Stephen Keogh
- 33 (Canada) Austin Shanks
- 47 (Haudenosaunee) Kyle Jackson
- 88 (Haudenosaunee) Cody Jamieson

Transition

- 6 (Canada) Brad Gillies
- 44 (Canada) Colton Armstrong

Practice

- 00 (Haudenosaunee) Johnny Jimerson
- 12 (Canada) Chet Koneczny
- 13 (Canada) Brandon Robinson
- 81 (Haudenosaunee) Clay Scanlan

Injured

- 20 (Canada) Luke Van Schepen

Head Coach

- Mike Accursi

Assistant Coaches

- Chad Culp
- Jason Johnson
- Roger Chrysler
- Billy Dee Smith

Athletic Performance Coach

- Dan Noble

Equipment Manager

- Dave Sowden

=== Entry Draft ===
The 2019 NLL Entry Draft took place on September 17, 2019. The Thunderbirds made the following selections:

Round	Overall	Player	College/Club
1	5	Clarke Petterson	Cornell University (NCAA D1)
1	14	Trevor Smyth	Rochester Institute of Technology (NCAA D1)
2	30	Clay Scanlan	Six Nations Arrows (OJALL)
3	38	Nonkon Thompson	Akwesasne Indians (OJBLL)
5	68	Matt Dziama	Virginia University (NCAA D1)
6	81	Brad Fannell	St. Catharines Athletics (OJALL)
