= 2020 Buffalo Bandits season =

2020 Buffalo Bandits
- League: NLL
- Division: North
- 2020 record: 7–4
- Home record: 4–2
- Road record: 3–2
- Goals for: 130
- Goals against: 118
- General Manager: Steve Dietrich
- Coach: John Tavares
- Captain: Steve Priolo
- Arena: KeyBank Center
- Average attendance: 12,089

Team leaders
- Goals: Josh Byrne (29)
- Assists: Dhane Smith (33)
- Points: Josh Byrne (55)
- Penalties in minutes: Mitch de Snoo (25)
- Loose Balls: Ian MacKay (93)
- Wins: Matt Vinc (7)
- Goals against average: Doug Buchan (4.94)

The Buffalo Bandits are a lacrosse team based in Buffalo, New York playing in the National Lacrosse League (NLL). The 2020 season was their 29th season in the NLL.

Due to the COVID-19 pandemic, the season was suspended on March 12, 2020. On April 8, the league made a further public statement announcing the cancellation of the remaining games of the 2020 season and that they would be exploring options for playoffs once it was safe to resume play. The league ultimately did not resume the 2020 season, in addition to cancelling the 2021 season as well due to the pandemic and government restrictions.

== Regular season ==
=== Final standings ===
North Division
P	Team	GP	W	L	PCT	GB	Home	Road	GF	GA	Diff	GF/GP	GA/GP
1	Halifax Thunderbirds	12	8	4	.667	0.0	6–1	2–3	139	126	+13	11.58	10.50
2	Toronto Rock	11	7	4	.636	0.5	4–2	3–2	122	106	+16	11.09	9.64
3	Buffalo Bandits	11	7	4	.636	0.5	4–2	3–2	130	118	+12	11.82	10.73
4	Rochester Knighthawks	12	2	10	.167	6.0	2–3	0–7	115	165	−50	9.58	13.75

East Division
P	Team	GP	W	L	PCT	GB	Home	Road	GF	GA	Diff	GF/GP	GA/GP
1	New England Black Wolves	11	8	3	.727	0.0	4–3	4–0	135	101	+34	12.27	9.18
2	Georgia Swarm	12	7	5	.583	1.5	2–4	5–1	149	126	+23	12.42	10.50
3	Philadelphia Wings	14	8	6	.571	1.5	3–3	5–3	151	134	+17	10.79	9.57
4	New York Riptide	13	1	12	.077	8.0	1–5	0–7	116	177	−61	8.92	13.62

West Division
P	Team	GP	W	L	PCT	GB	Home	Road	GF	GA	Diff	GF/GP	GA/GP
1	Saskatchewan Rush	10	7	3	.700	0.0	2–3	5–0	111	93	+18	11.10	9.30
2	Colorado Mammoth	13	7	6	.538	1.5	4–2	3–4	128	125	+3	9.85	9.62
3	San Diego Seals	12	6	6	.500	2.0	3–3	3–3	138	131	+7	11.50	10.92
4	Calgary Roughnecks	10	5	5	.500	2.0	1–4	4–1	122	111	+11	12.20	11.10
5	Vancouver Warriors	13	4	9	.308	4.5	2–4	2–5	117	160	−43	9.00	12.31

x: Clinched playoff berth; c: Clinched playoff berth by crossing over to another division; y: Clinched division; z: Clinched best regular season record; GP: Games Played
W: Wins; L: Losses; GB: Games back; PCT: Win percentage; Home: Record at Home; Road: Record on the Road; GF: Goals scored; GA: Goals allowed
Differential: Difference between goals scored and allowed; GF/GP: Average number of goals scored per game; GA/GP: Average number of goals allowed per game

== Game log ==
Game	Date	Opponent	Location	Score	OT	Attendance	Record
1	December 7, 2019	San Diego Seals	KeyBank Center	W 13–10		10,685	1–0
2	December 28, 2019	Halifax Thunderbirds	KeyBank Center	L 10–15		13,576	1–1
3	January 11, 2020	@ Georgia Swarm	Infinite Energy Arena	W 16–10		8,585	2–1
4	January 18, 2020	Toronto Rock	KeyBank Center	W 10–8		12,026	3–1
5	January 25, 2020	@ Colorado Mammoth	Pepsi Center	W 13–12	OT	10,994	4–1
6	January 31, 2020	Rochester Knighthawks	KeyBank Center	W 16–15	OT	10,978	5–1
7	February 7, 2020	@ Vancouver Warriors	Rogers Arena	W 15–8		7,215	6–1
8	February 9, 2020	@ Toronto Rock	Scotiabank Arena	L 9–13		7,021	6–2
9	February 15, 2020	Philadelphia Wings	KeyBank Center	L 6–7		12,459	6–3
10	February 29, 2020	Halifax Thunderbirds	KeyBank Center	W 13–9		12,813	7–3
11	March 8, 2020	@ Halifax Thunderbirds	Scotiabank Centre	L 9–11		8,359	7–4

== Cancelled games ==
Game	Date	Opponent	Location	Score	OT	Attendance	Record
12	March 13, 2020	@ Toronto Rock	Scotiabank Arena				
13	March 14, 2020	New England Black Wolves	KeyBank Center				
14	March 28, 2020	Saskatchewan Rush	KeyBank Center				
15	April 3, 2020	@ Calgary Roughnecks	Scotiabank Saddledome				
16	April 11, 2020	@ Rochester Knighthawks	Blue Cross Arena				
17	April 18, 2020	New York Riptide	KeyBank Center				
18	April 25, 2020	@ Rochester Knighthawks	Blue Cross Arena				

== Roster ==
Buffalo Bandits roster
Active (21-man) roster		Inactive roster	Coaches
Goaltenders: 33 (Canada) Zach Higgins; 48 (Canada) Matt Vinc; Defensemen: 7 (Canada) Bryce Sweeting; 12 (Canada) Mitch de Snoo; 19 (Canada) Matthew Bennett; 20 (Canada) Nick Weiss; 21 (Canada) Justin Martin; 23 (Canada) Steve Priolo (C); 25 (Canada) Matt Spanger; 94 (Canada) Ryan Wagner	Forwards: 15 (Canada) Shawn Evans; 22 (Canada) Josh Byrne; 45 (Canada) Corey Small; 78 (Canada) Jordan Durston; 91 (Canada) Thomas Hoggarth; 92 (Canada) Dhane Smith; 95 (Canada) Chase Fraser; Transition: 4 (Canada) Ian MacKay; 8 (Canada) Kevin Brownell; 37 (Canada) Ethan O'Connor; 81 (Canada) Matt Gilray	Practice squad: (Canada) Dallas Bridle; 71 (Canada) Zach Herreweyers; (Canada) Devlin Shanahan; Injured reserve: 9 (Canada) Mark Steenhuis; (Canada) Jon Harnett	Head coach: John Tavares; Rich Kilgour; Assistant coaches: Anthony Cosmo; Dave Pym; Rusty Kruger; Equipment Manager: Ted Cordingley; Legend: * Suspended list; (C) Captain; (A) Alternate captain; Roster updated 2019-01-06; NLL Transactions

=== Entry Draft ===
The 2019 NLL Entry Draft took place on September 17, 2019. The Bandits made the following selections:

Round	Overall	Player	College/Club
1	12	Brent Noseworthy	Michigan University
2	29	Nathaniel Kozevnikov	Robert Morris University
3	45	Ryder Garnsey	Notre Dame University
4	52	Taylor Kauffeldt	Brampton Jr. A
4	56	Tyler Halls	Orangeville
6	84	Joel Watson	Whitby

== Player stats ==
= Indicates team leader

=== Runners (Top 10) ===
Player	GP	G	A	Pts	LB	PIM
Josh Byrne	11	29	26	55	52	7
Dhane Smith	8	15	33	48	48	4
Chris Cloutier	10	20	21	41	50	2
Corey Small	11	17	21	38	37	0
Chase Fraser	8	16	10	26	34	21
Garrett Billings	8	3	17	20	23	2
Matt Gilray	11	5	7	12	81	2
Ian MacKay	11	7	4	11	93	16
Dallas Bridle	4	1	9	10	8	0
Nick Weiss	8	4	4	8	30	4
Totals		130	194	324	846	161

=== Goaltenders ===
Player	GP	MIN	W	L	GA	Sv%	GAA
Matt Vinc	11	627:24	7	4	113	.808	10.81
Doug Buchan	10	36:26	0	0	3	.880	4.94
Totals		663:50	7	4	116	.811	10.48
