= 2020 Philadelphia Wings season =

National Lacrosse League season

2020 Philadelphia Wings
- League: NLL
- Division: East
- 2020 record: 8–6
- Home record: 3–3
- Road record: 5–3
- Goals for: 151
- Goals against: 134
- General Manager: Paul Day
- Coach: Paul Day
- Arena: Wells Fargo Center
- Average attendance: 8,054

The Philadelphia Wings are a lacrosse team based in Philadelphia, Pennsylvania, playing in the National Lacrosse League (NLL). The 2019-2020 season is their 2nd season in the NLL. Due to the COVID-19 pandemic in Philadelphia, the season was suspended on March 12, 2020. On April 8, the league made a further public statement announcing the cancellation of the remaining games of the 2020 season and that they would be exploring options for playoffs once it was safe to resume play.

On June 4, the league confirmed that the playoffs would also be cancelled due to the pandemic.

== Regular season ==
=== Final standings ===
North Division
P	Team	GP	W	L	PCT	GB	Home	Road	GF	GA	Diff	GF/GP	GA/GP
1	Halifax Thunderbirds	12	8	4	.667	0.0	6–1	2–3	139	126	+13	11.58	10.50
2	Toronto Rock	11	7	4	.636	0.5	4–2	3–2	122	106	+16	11.09	9.64
3	Buffalo Bandits	11	7	4	.636	0.5	4–2	3–2	130	118	+12	11.82	10.73
4	Rochester Knighthawks	12	2	10	.167	6.0	2–3	0–7	115	165	−50	9.58	13.75

East Division
P	Team	GP	W	L	PCT	GB	Home	Road	GF	GA	Diff	GF/GP	GA/GP
1	New England Black Wolves	11	8	3	.727	0.0	4–3	4–0	135	101	+34	12.27	9.18
2	Georgia Swarm	12	7	5	.583	1.5	2–4	5–1	149	126	+23	12.42	10.50
3	Philadelphia Wings	14	8	6	.571	1.5	3–3	5–3	151	134	+17	10.79	9.57
4	New York Riptide	13	1	12	.077	8.0	1–5	0–7	116	177	−61	8.92	13.62

West Division
P	Team	GP	W	L	PCT	GB	Home	Road	GF	GA	Diff	GF/GP	GA/GP
1	Saskatchewan Rush	10	7	3	.700	0.0	2–3	5–0	111	93	+18	11.10	9.30
2	Colorado Mammoth	13	7	6	.538	1.5	4–2	3–4	128	125	+3	9.85	9.62
3	San Diego Seals	12	6	6	.500	2.0	3–3	3–3	138	131	+7	11.50	10.92
4	Calgary Roughnecks	10	5	5	.500	2.0	1–4	4–1	122	111	+11	12.20	11.10
5	Vancouver Warriors	13	4	9	.308	4.5	2–4	2–5	117	160	−43	9.00	12.31

x: Clinched playoff berth; c: Clinched playoff berth by crossing over to another division; y: Clinched division; z: Clinched best regular season record; GP: Games Played
W: Wins; L: Losses; GB: Games back; PCT: Win percentage; Home: Record at Home; Road: Record on the Road; GF: Goals scored; GA: Goals allowed
Differential: Difference between goals scored and allowed; GF/GP: Average number of goals scored per game; GA/GP: Average number of goals allowed per game

== Game log ==
Game	Date	Opponent	Location	Score	OT	Attendance	Record
1	December 14, 2019	@ Georgia Swarm	Infinite Energy Arena	L 6–12		6,301	0–1
2	December 28, 2019	@ Calgary Roughnecks	Scotiabank Saddledome	W 8–7		11,352	1–1
3	January 4, 2020	@ New York Riptide	Nassau Coliseum	W 15–12		5,019	2–1
4	January 10, 2020	Vancouver Warriors	Wells Fargo Center (Philadelphia)	W 18–10		9,676	3–1
5	January 18, 2020	@ New England Black Wolves	Mohegan Sun Arena	L 7–8	OT	4,084	3–2
6	January 19, 2020	Rochester Knighthawks	Wells Fargo Center (Philadelphia)	W 12–4		7,015	4–2
7	January 24, 2020	New York Riptide	Wells Fargo Center (Philadelphia)	W 14–6		7,183	5–2
8	January 31, 2020	Georgia Swarm	Wells Fargo Center (Philadelphia)	L 11–12		6,679	5–3
9	February 15, 2020	@ Buffalo Bandits	KeyBank Center	W 7–6		12,459	6–3
10	February 16, 2020	@ New England Black Wolves	Mohegan Sun Arena	W 14–11		5,387	7–3
11	February 22, 2020	Saskatchewan Rush	Wells Fargo Center (Philadelphia)	L 10–15		9,683	7–4
12	February 29, 2020	@ Colorado Mammoth	Pepsi Center	L 10–11		12,297	7–5
13	March 7, 2020	New England Black Wolves	Wells Fargo Center (Philadelphia)	L 7–9		8,089	7–6
14	March 8, 2020	@ Georgia Swarm	Infinite Energy Arena	W 12–11		8,662	8–6

== Cancelled games ==
Game	Date	Opponent	Location	Score	OT	Attendance	Record
15	March 15, 2020	New York Riptide	Wells Fargo Center (Philadelphia)				
16	March 28, 2020	San Diego Seals	Wells Fargo Center (Philadelphia)				
17	April 4, 2020	Toronto Rock	Wells Fargo Center (Philadelphia)				
18	April 18, 2020	@ Halifax Thunderbirds	Scotiabank Centre				

== Roster ==
Philadelphia Wings roster
Active (21-man) roster		Inactive roster	Coaches
Goaltenders: 31 (Canada) Zach Higgins; 36 (Canada) Brandon Miller; Defensemen: 55 (United States) Liam Byrnes; 18 (Canada) Steph Charbonneau; 16 (Canada) Nick Finlay; 33 (Canada) Anthony Joaquim; 29 (Canada) Ian Llord; 41 (Canada) Alex Pace; 12 (Canada) Liam Patten; 2 (Canada) Eric Shewell; 51 (Canada) Nate Wade; 94 (Canada) Ryan Wagner	Forwards: 72 (United States) Kevin Buchanan; 21 (Canada) Kevin Crowley; 27 (Canada) Josh Currier; 44 (United States) Jordan Hall (A); 11 (Canada) Brett Hickey; 1 (United States) Matt Rambo; 10 (United States) Blaze Riorden; 23 (Canada) Cory Vitarelli; Transition: 9 (United States) Trevor Baptiste; 26 (United States) Isaiah Davis-Allen; 46 (Canada) Kiel Matisz (C)	Practice squad: (United States) Kyle Marr; (United States) Austin Pifani; (Canada) Matt Marinier; 93 (Canada) Daryl Waud	Head coach: Ian Rubel (2024); Assistant coaches: Landon Miller; Legend: * Suspended list; (C) Captain; (A) Alternate captain; Roster updated 2022-05-20; NLL Transactions

=== Entry Draft ===
The 2019 NLL Entry Draft took place on September 17, 2019. The Wings made the following selections:

Round	Overall	Player	College/Club
2	20	Alex Pace	Brock University
2	21	Matt Marinier	Burlington Chiefs
3	36	Pat Spencer	Loyola University
4	51	Kyle Marr	Johns Hopkins University
4	53	Dave Smith	Virginia University
5	66	Jordan Krug	Cabrini University
6	79	Austin Fusco	Syracuse University
