= 2020 San Diego Seals season =

National Lacrosse League season

2020 San Diego Seals
- League: NLL
- Division: West
- 2020 record: 6-6
- Home record: 3-3
- Road record: 3-3
- Goals for: 138
- Goals against: 131
- General Manager: Patrick Merrill
- Coach: Patrick Merrill
- Captain: Brodie Merrill
- Alternate captains: Dan Dawson; Kyle Buchanan; Cam Holding
- Arena: Pechanga Arena

The San Diego Seals are a lacrosse team based in San Diego, California. The team plays in the National Lacrosse League (NLL). The 2020 season was their second season in the NLL. Due to the COVID-19 pandemic, the season was suspended on March 12, 2020. On April 8, the league made a further public statement announcing the cancellation of the remaining games of the 2020 season and that they would be exploring options for playoffs once it was safe to resume play.

== Regular season ==
=== Final standings ===
North Division
P	Team	GP	W	L	PCT	GB	Home	Road	GF	GA	Diff	GF/GP	GA/GP
1	Halifax Thunderbirds	12	8	4	.667	0.0	6–1	2–3	139	126	+13	11.58	10.50
2	Toronto Rock	11	7	4	.636	0.5	4–2	3–2	122	106	+16	11.09	9.64
3	Buffalo Bandits	11	7	4	.636	0.5	4–2	3–2	130	118	+12	11.82	10.73
4	Rochester Knighthawks	12	2	10	.167	6.0	2–3	0–7	115	165	−50	9.58	13.75

East Division
P	Team	GP	W	L	PCT	GB	Home	Road	GF	GA	Diff	GF/GP	GA/GP
1	New England Black Wolves	11	8	3	.727	0.0	4–3	4–0	135	101	+34	12.27	9.18
2	Georgia Swarm	12	7	5	.583	1.5	2–4	5–1	149	126	+23	12.42	10.50
3	Philadelphia Wings	14	8	6	.571	1.5	3–3	5–3	151	134	+17	10.79	9.57
4	New York Riptide	13	1	12	.077	8.0	1–5	0–7	116	177	−61	8.92	13.62

West Division
P	Team	GP	W	L	PCT	GB	Home	Road	GF	GA	Diff	GF/GP	GA/GP
1	Saskatchewan Rush	10	7	3	.700	0.0	2–3	5–0	111	93	+18	11.10	9.30
2	Colorado Mammoth	13	7	6	.538	1.5	4–2	3–4	128	125	+3	9.85	9.62
3	San Diego Seals	12	6	6	.500	2.0	3–3	3–3	138	131	+7	11.50	10.92
4	Calgary Roughnecks	10	5	5	.500	2.0	1–4	4–1	122	111	+11	12.20	11.10
5	Vancouver Warriors	13	4	9	.308	4.5	2–4	2–5	117	160	−43	9.00	12.31

x: Clinched playoff berth; c: Clinched playoff berth by crossing over to another division; y: Clinched division; z: Clinched best regular season record; GP: Games Played
W: Wins; L: Losses; GB: Games back; PCT: Win percentage; Home: Record at Home; Road: Record on the Road; GF: Goals scored; GA: Goals allowed
Differential: Difference between goals scored and allowed; GF/GP: Average number of goals scored per game; GA/GP: Average number of goals allowed per game

== Game log ==
=== Regular season ===
Game	Date	Opponent	Location	Score	OT	Attendance	Record
1	December 7, 2019	@ Buffalo Bandits	KeyBank Center	L 10–13		10,685	0–1
2	December 14, 2019	Toronto Rock	Pechanga Arena San Diego	L 6–13		5,414	0–2
3	December 27, 2019	Calgary Roughnecks	Pechanga Arena San Diego	L 11–16		4,088	0–3
4	December 29, 2019	@ Vancouver Warriors	Rogers Arena	W 11–10	OT	6,125	1–3
5	January 12, 2020	Saskatchewan Rush	Pechanga Arena San Diego	L 9–12		4,145	1–4
6	January 18, 2020	@ Halifax Thunderbirds	Scotiabank Centre	L 5–8		7,219	1–5
7	January 25, 2020	@ New York Riptide	Nassau Coliseum	W 15–11		3,275	2–5
8	February 1, 2020	@ Colorado Mammoth	Orleans Arena	W 17–10		4,821	3–5
9	February 15, 2020	@ Colorado Mammoth	Pepsi Center	L 7–10		10,820	3–6
10	February 22, 2020	Vancouver Warriors	Pechanga Arena San Diego	W 15–10		4,217	4–6
11	February 29, 2020	@ Calgary Roughnecks	Scotiabank Saddledome	W 13–12		12,217	5–6
12	March 7, 2020	Rochester Knighthawks	Pechanga Arena San Diego	W 19–6		6,292	6–6

The eighth game of the season was a home game played at the Orleans Arena in Paradise.

== Cancelled games ==
Game	Date	Opponent	Location	Score	OT	Attendance	Record
13	March 13, 2020	@ Vancouver Warriors	Rogers Arena				
14	March 20, 2020	New England Black Wolves	Pechanga Arena San Diego				
15	March 28, 2020	@ Philadelphia Wings	Wells Fargo Center (Philadelphia)				
16	April 4, 2020	Georgia Swarm	Pechanga Arena San Diego				
17	April 11, 2020	@ Saskatchewan Rush	SaskTel Centre				
18	April 25, 2020	Calgary Roughnecks	Pechanga Arena San Diego				

== Roster ==
San Diego Seals roster
Active (21-man) roster		Inactive roster	Coaches
Goaltenders: 85 (Canada) Tyler Carlson; 92 (England) Frank Scigliano; Defensemen: 44 (Canada) Graydon Bradley; 52 (United States) Garett Epple; 11 (United States) Mark Glicini; 25 (United States) Eli Gobrecht; 19 (Canada) Cam Holding; 3 (Canada) Garrett McIntosh; 17 (Canada) Brodie Merrill; 7 (Canada) Tor Reinholdt; 12 (Canada) Matt Sykes	Forwards: 14 (Canada) Wesley Berg; 91 (Canada) Kyle Buchanan; 5 (United States) Connor Fields; 88 (Canada) Zack Greer; 81 (Canada) Connor Kearnan; 22 (Canada) Evan Messenger; 45 (Canada) Jeremy Noble; Transition: 2 (Canada) Drew Belgrave; 63 (Canada) Brandon Clelland	Practice squad: 77 (United States) Jules Heningburg; 4 (Canada) Ethan Schott; 59 (United States) Mikie Schlosser; Injured reserve: 21 (Canada) Casey Jackson; 33 (United States) Zach Miller; 30 (Canada) Johnny Pearson; 83 (Haudenosaunee) Austin Staats	Head coach: Patrick Merrill; Assistant coaches: Josh Sanderson; Bill Greer; Legend: * Suspended list; (C) Captain; (A) Alternate captain; Roster updated 2019-01-18; NLL Transactions

== See also ==
- 2020 NLL season
