= 2020 Toronto Rock season =

2020 Toronto Rock
- League: NLL
- Division: North
- 2020 record: 7-4
- Home record: 4-2
- Road record: 3-2
- Goals for: 122
- Goals against: 106
- General Manager: Jamie Dawick
- Coach: Matt Sawyer
- Captain: Challen Rogers
- Alternate captains: Rob Hellyer; Bill Hostrawser; Brad Kri; Tom Schreiber
- Arena: Scotiabank Arena

The Toronto Rock are a lacrosse team based in Toronto playing in the National Lacrosse League (NLL). The 2020 season is the 23rd in franchise history, and 22nd as the Rock. Due to the COVID-19 pandemic, the season was suspended on March 12, 2020. On April 8, the league made a further public statement announcing the cancellation of the remaining games of the 2020 season and that they would be exploring options for playoffs once it was safe to resume play. On February 3, 2021, the NLL announced that plans for an abbreviated spring season were cancelled due to travel and logistics uncertainty, and that their focus will move toward playing a full 2021–22 NLL season.

== Regular season ==
=== Final standings ===
North Division
P	Team	GP	W	L	PCT	GB	Home	Road	GF	GA	Diff	GF/GP	GA/GP
1	Halifax Thunderbirds	12	8	4	.667	0.0	6–1	2–3	139	126	+13	11.58	10.50
2	Toronto Rock	11	7	4	.636	0.5	4–2	3–2	122	106	+16	11.09	9.64
3	Buffalo Bandits	11	7	4	.636	0.5	4–2	3–2	130	118	+12	11.82	10.73
4	Rochester Knighthawks	12	2	10	.167	6.0	2–3	0–7	115	165	−50	9.58	13.75

East Division
P	Team	GP	W	L	PCT	GB	Home	Road	GF	GA	Diff	GF/GP	GA/GP
1	New England Black Wolves	11	8	3	.727	0.0	4–3	4–0	135	101	+34	12.27	9.18
2	Georgia Swarm	12	7	5	.583	1.5	2–4	5–1	149	126	+23	12.42	10.50
3	Philadelphia Wings	14	8	6	.571	1.5	3–3	5–3	151	134	+17	10.79	9.57
4	New York Riptide	13	1	12	.077	8.0	1–5	0–7	116	177	−61	8.92	13.62

West Division
P	Team	GP	W	L	PCT	GB	Home	Road	GF	GA	Diff	GF/GP	GA/GP
1	Saskatchewan Rush	10	7	3	.700	0.0	2–3	5–0	111	93	+18	11.10	9.30
2	Colorado Mammoth	13	7	6	.538	1.5	4–2	3–4	128	125	+3	9.85	9.62
3	San Diego Seals	12	6	6	.500	2.0	3–3	3–3	138	131	+7	11.50	10.92
4	Calgary Roughnecks	10	5	5	.500	2.0	1–4	4–1	122	111	+11	12.20	11.10
5	Vancouver Warriors	13	4	9	.308	4.5	2–4	2–5	117	160	−43	9.00	12.31

x: Clinched playoff berth; c: Clinched playoff berth by crossing over to another division; y: Clinched division; z: Clinched best regular season record; GP: Games Played
W: Wins; L: Losses; GB: Games back; PCT: Win percentage; Home: Record at Home; Road: Record on the Road; GF: Goals scored; GA: Goals allowed
Differential: Difference between goals scored and allowed; GF/GP: Average number of goals scored per game; GA/GP: Average number of goals allowed per game

== Game log ==
Game	Date	Opponent	Location	Score	OT	Attendance	Record
1	December 7, 2019	New England Black Wolves	Scotiabank Arena	L 8–12		7,158	0–1
2	December 14, 2019	@ San Diego Seals	Pechanga Arena	W 13–6		5,414	1–1
3	December 28, 2019	@ Rochester Knighthawks	Blue Cross Arena	W 14–11		5,036	2–1
4	January 11, 2020	Rochester Knighthawks	Scotiabank Arena	W 13–12		8,685	3–1
5	January 18, 2020	@ Buffalo Bandits	KeyBank Center	L 8–10		12,026	3–2
6	January 31, 2020	Halifax Thunderbirds	Scotiabank Arena	W 12–9		10,946	4–2
7	February 9, 2020	Buffalo Bandits	Scotiabank Arena	W 13–9		7,021	5–2
8	February 15, 2020	Vancouver Warriors	Scotiabank Arena	W 14–7		8,401	6–2
9	February 21, 2020	@ Halifax Thunderbirds	Scotiabank Centre	L 8–9		9,337	6–3
10	February 29, 2020	@ Saskatchewan Rush	SaskTel Centre	W 9–8		12,764	7–3
11	March 8, 2020	Calgary Roughnecks	Scotiabank Arena	L 10–13		7,826	7–4

== Cancelled games ==
Game	Date	Opponent	Location	Score	OT	Attendance	Record
12	March 13, 2020	Buffalo Bandits	Scotiabank Arena				
13	March 27, 2020	Colorado Mammoth	Scotiabank Arena				
14	April 4, 2020	@ Philadelphia Wings	Wells Fargo Center				
15	April 5, 2020	@ New York Riptide	Nassau Coliseum				
16	April 11, 2020	@ Georgia Swarm	Infinite Energy Arena				
17	April 17, 2020	Rochester Knighthawks	Scotiabank Arena				
18	April 25, 2020	@ Halifax Thunderbirds	Scotiabank Centre				

== Roster ==
Toronto Rock roster
Active (21-man) roster		Inactive roster	Coaches
Goaltenders: 1 (Canada) Riley Hutchcraft; 66 (Canada) Nick Rose; Defensemen: 71 (Canada) Sheldon Burns; 21 (Canada) Mitch de Snoo; 13 (Canada) Scott Dominey; 45 (Canada) Damon Edwards; 91 (Canada) Bill Hostrawser (A); 47 (Canada) Adam Jay; 33 (Canada) Josh Jubenville; 20 (Canada) Bradley Kri (A); 22 (Canada) Jason Noble; 23 (Canada) Challen Rogers (C); 11 (Canada) Taylor Stuart	Forwards: 25 (Canada) Dan Craig; 6 (Canada) Dan Dawson; 17 (Canada) Aaron Forster; 10 (Canada) Rob Hellyer (A); 2 (Canada) Zach Manns; 18 (Haudenosaunee) Johnny Powless; 97 (Canada) Reid Reinholdt; 26 (United States) Tom Schreiber (A)	Practice squad: 42 (Canada) Jamison Dilks (D); 9 (Canada) Mitchell Gustavsen (D); 92 (Canada) Troy Holowchuk (G); 77 (Canada) Alec Simons (F); Injured reserve: 93 (Canada) Latrell Harris (D); 16 (Canada) Adam Jones (F); 61 (Canada) Brandon Slade (D); Holdout: 2 (Canada) AJ Kluck (D); Protected list: 99 (United States) Paul Rabil (T)	Head coach: Matt Sawyer; Assistant coaches: Bruce Codd; Blaine Manning; Brandon Miller; Legend: * Suspended list; (C) Captain; (A) Alternate captain; Roster updated 2020-07-16; NLL Transactions

=== Entry Draft ===
The 2019 NLL Entry Draft took place on September 17, 2019. The Toronto Rock made the following selections:

Round	Overall	Player	College/Club
1	15	Aaron Forster	NJIT
2	27	Zach Manns	Drexel University
3	43	Jamison Dilks	Six Nations Jr. A
4	54	Troy Holowchuk	Six Nations Jr. A
5	69	Ryan Conrad	Virginia University
6	82	Jordan Caskenette	Orangeville Jr. A
