= 2020 Colorado Mammoth season =

National Lacrosse League season

2020 Colorado Mammoth
- League: NLL
- Division: West
- 2020 record: 7-6
- Home record: 4-2
- Road record: 3-4
- Goals for: 128
- Goals against: 126
- General Manager: Pat Coyle
- Coach: Pat Coyle
- Captain: Dan Coates
- Alternate captains: Joey Cupido; Robert Hope
- Arena: Pepsi Center

The Colorado Mammoth are a lacrosse team based in Denver, Colorado playing in the National Lacrosse League (NLL). The 2020 season is the 34th in franchise history and 18th as the Mammoth (previously the Washington Power, Pittsburgh Crossefire, and Baltimore Thunder). Due to the COVID-19 pandemic, the season was suspended on March 12, 2020. On April 8, the league made a further public statement announcing the cancellation of the remaining games of the 2020 season and that they would be exploring options for playoffs once it was safe to resume play.

== Final standings ==
North Division
P	Team	GP	W	L	PCT	GB	Home	Road	GF	GA	Diff	GF/GP	GA/GP
1	Halifax Thunderbirds	12	8	4	.667	0.0	6–1	2–3	139	126	+13	11.58	10.50
2	Toronto Rock	11	7	4	.636	0.5	4–2	3–2	122	106	+16	11.09	9.64
3	Buffalo Bandits	11	7	4	.636	0.5	4–2	3–2	130	118	+12	11.82	10.73
4	Rochester Knighthawks	12	2	10	.167	6.0	2–3	0–7	115	165	−50	9.58	13.75

East Division
P	Team	GP	W	L	PCT	GB	Home	Road	GF	GA	Diff	GF/GP	GA/GP
1	New England Black Wolves	11	8	3	.727	0.0	4–3	4–0	135	101	+34	12.27	9.18
2	Georgia Swarm	12	7	5	.583	1.5	2–4	5–1	149	126	+23	12.42	10.50
3	Philadelphia Wings	14	8	6	.571	1.5	3–3	5–3	151	134	+17	10.79	9.57
4	New York Riptide	13	1	12	.077	8.0	1–5	0–7	116	177	−61	8.92	13.62

West Division
P	Team	GP	W	L	PCT	GB	Home	Road	GF	GA	Diff	GF/GP	GA/GP
1	Saskatchewan Rush	10	7	3	.700	0.0	2–3	5–0	111	93	+18	11.10	9.30
2	Colorado Mammoth	13	7	6	.538	1.5	4–2	3–4	128	125	+3	9.85	9.62
3	San Diego Seals	12	6	6	.500	2.0	3–3	3–3	138	131	+7	11.50	10.92
4	Calgary Roughnecks	10	5	5	.500	2.0	1–4	4–1	122	111	+11	12.20	11.10
5	Vancouver Warriors	13	4	9	.308	4.5	2–4	2–5	117	160	−43	9.00	12.31

x: Clinched playoff berth; c: Clinched playoff berth by crossing over to another division; y: Clinched division; z: Clinched best regular season record; GP: Games Played
W: Wins; L: Losses; GB: Games back; PCT: Win percentage; Home: Record at Home; Road: Record on the Road; GF: Goals scored; GA: Goals allowed
Differential: Difference between goals scored and allowed; GF/GP: Average number of goals scored per game; GA/GP: Average number of goals allowed per game

=== Regular season ===
Game	Date	Opponent	Location	Score	OT	Attendance	Record
1	November 29, 2019	Saskatchewan Rush	Pepsi Center	L 8–9		12,132	0–1
2	December 21, 2019	@ Calgary Roughnecks	Scotiabank Saddledome	W 8–7	OT	12,072	1–1
3	December 28, 2019	@ Georgia Swarm	Infinite Energy Arena	W 13–11		5,724	2–1
4	January 4, 2020	Vancouver Warriors	Pepsi Center	W 13–9		11,157	3–1
5	January 11, 2020	@ Halifax Thunderbirds	Scotiabank Centre	L 9–12		7,623	3–2
6	January 17, 2020	@ Vancouver Warriors	Rogers Arena	L 5–7		6,450	3–3
7	January 18, 2020	@ Saskatchewan Rush	SaskTel Centre	W 12–6		12,542	4–3
8	January 25, 2020	Buffalo Bandits	Pepsi Center	L 12–13	OT	10,994	4–4
9	February 1, 2020	@ San Diego Seals	Orleans Arena	L 10–17		4,821	4–5
10	February 8, 2020	@ Saskatchewan Rush	SaskTel Centre	L 7–9		11,982	4–6
11	February 15, 2020	San Diego Seals	Pepsi Center	W 10–7		10,820	5–6
12	February 29, 2020	Philadelphia Wings	Pepsi Center	W 11–10		12,297	6–6
13	March 8, 2020	Rochester Knighthawks	Pepsi Center	W 10–8		12,121	7–6

== Cancelled games ==
Game	Date	Opponent	Location	Score	OT	Attendance	Record
14	March 20, 2020	Calgary Roughnecks	Pepsi Center				
15	March 27, 2020	@ Toronto Rock	Scotiabank Arena				
16	March 28, 2020	@ New York Riptide	Nassau Coliseum				
17	April 4, 2020	New England Black Wolves	Pepsi Center				
18	April 17, 2020	Vancouver Warriors	Pepsi Center				

== Roster ==
Colorado Mammoth roster
Active (21-man) roster		Inactive roster	Coaches
Goaltenders: 30 (Canada) Tyler Carlson; 45 (Canada) Dillon Ward; Defensemen: 13 (Canada) Brett Craig; 37 (Canada) Dan Coates (C); 82 (Canada) Joey Cupido (A); 27 (Canada) Scott Carnegie; 3 (United States) Tim Edwards; 14 (Canada) Warren Jeffrey; 23 (Canada) Jordan Gilles; 18 (Canada) Robert Hope (A); 86 (Canada) John Lintz; 4 (Canada) Josh Sullivan	Forwards: 67 (Canada) Kyle Killen; 55 (Canada) Dylan Kinnear; 16 (Canada) Ryan Lee; 51 (Canada) Eli McLaughlin; 2 (Canada) Will Malcom; 20 (Canada) Jacob Ruest; 17 (Canada) Chris Wardle; 7 (Canada) Tyler Digby; 28 (Haudenosaunee) Zed Williams	Practice squad: 41 (Canada) Erik Turner; 15 (Serbia) Ilija Gajic; 91 (Canada) Jake McNabb; 71 (Canada) Jeff Wittig; Holdout: 84 (United States) Dylan Molloy	Head coach: Pat Coyle; Assistant coaches: Andrew McBride; Shawn Williams; Legend: * Suspended list; (C) Captain; (A) Alternate captain; updated 2018-01-02; NLL Transactions

== See also ==
- 2020 NLL season
