= 2020 New York Riptide season =

NLL season

2020 New York Riptide
- League: NLL
- Division: East
- 2020 record: 1-12
- Home record: 1-5
- Road record: 0-7
- Goals for: 116
- Goals against: 177
- General Manager: Regy Thorpe
- Coach: Regy Thorpe
- Arena: Nassau Coliseum
- Average attendance: 4,157

The New York Riptide are a lacrosse team based in Uniondale, New York playing in the National Lacrosse League (NLL). The 2020 season was the team's 1st season in the league. Due to the COVID-19 pandemic, the season was suspended on March 12, 2020. On April 8, the league made a further public statement announcing the cancellation of the remaining games of the 2020 season and that they would be exploring options for playoffs once it was safe to resume play.

== Regular season ==
=== Current standings ===
North Division
P	Team	GP	W	L	PCT	GB	Home	Road	GF	GA	Diff	GF/GP	GA/GP
1	Halifax Thunderbirds	12	8	4	.667	0.0	6–1	2–3	139	126	+13	11.58	10.50
2	Toronto Rock	11	7	4	.636	0.5	4–2	3–2	122	106	+16	11.09	9.64
3	Buffalo Bandits	11	7	4	.636	0.5	4–2	3–2	130	118	+12	11.82	10.73
4	Rochester Knighthawks	12	2	10	.167	6.0	2–3	0–7	115	165	−50	9.58	13.75

East Division
P	Team	GP	W	L	PCT	GB	Home	Road	GF	GA	Diff	GF/GP	GA/GP
1	New England Black Wolves	11	8	3	.727	0.0	4–3	4–0	135	101	+34	12.27	9.18
2	Georgia Swarm	12	7	5	.583	1.5	2–4	5–1	149	126	+23	12.42	10.50
3	Philadelphia Wings	14	8	6	.571	1.5	3–3	5–3	151	134	+17	10.79	9.57
4	New York Riptide	13	1	12	.077	8.0	1–5	0–7	116	177	−61	8.92	13.62

West Division
P	Team	GP	W	L	PCT	GB	Home	Road	GF	GA	Diff	GF/GP	GA/GP
1	Saskatchewan Rush	10	7	3	.700	0.0	2–3	5–0	111	93	+18	11.10	9.30
2	Colorado Mammoth	13	7	6	.538	1.5	4–2	3–4	128	125	+3	9.85	9.62
3	San Diego Seals	12	6	6	.500	2.0	3–3	3–3	138	131	+7	11.50	10.92
4	Calgary Roughnecks	10	5	5	.500	2.0	1–4	4–1	122	111	+11	12.20	11.10
5	Vancouver Warriors	13	4	9	.308	4.5	2–4	2–5	117	160	−43	9.00	12.31

x: Clinched playoff berth; c: Clinched playoff berth by crossing over to another division; y: Clinched division; z: Clinched best regular season record; GP: Games Played
W: Wins; L: Losses; GB: Games back; PCT: Win percentage; Home: Record at Home; Road: Record on the Road; GF: Goals scored; GA: Goals allowed
Differential: Difference between goals scored and allowed; GF/GP: Average number of goals scored per game; GA/GP: Average number of goals allowed per game

== Game log ==
Game	Date	Opponent	Location	Score	OT	Attendance	Record
1	December 7, 2019	@ Halifax Thunderbirds	Scotiabank Centre	L 4–12		6,847	0–1
2	December 14, 2019	@ Vancouver Warriors	Rogers Arena	L 10–14		5,120	0–2
3	December 27, 2019	@ New England Black Wolves	Mohegan Sun Arena	L 11–21		6,089	0–3
4	December 28, 2019	Saskatchewan Rush	Nassau Coliseum	L 4–11		6,089	0–4
5	January 4, 2020	Philadelphia Wings	Nassau Coliseum	L 12–15		5,019	0–5
6	January 18, 2020	Georgia Swarm	Nassau Coliseum	W 13–12	OT	2,351	1–5
7	January 24, 2020	@ Philadelphia Wings	Wells Fargo Center (Philadelphia)	L 6–14		7,183	1–6
8	January 25, 2020	San Diego Seals	Nassau Coliseum	L 11–15		3,275	1–7
9	February 8, 2020	@ Calgary Roughnecks	Scotiabank Saddledome	L 9–13		12,384	1–8
10	February 15, 2020	@ Georgia Swarm	Infinite Energy Arena	L 9–14		8,591	1–9
11	February 28, 2020	New England Black Wolves	Nassau Coliseum	L 8–12		3,001	1–10
12	February 29, 2020	@ Rochester Knighthawks	Blue Cross Arena	L 12–13		6,006	1–11
13	March 7, 2020	Georgia Swarm	Nassau Coliseum	L 7–11		5,207	1–12

== Cancelled games ==
Game	Date	Opponent	Location	Score	OT	Attendance	Record
14	March 15, 2020	@ Philadelphia Wings	Wells Fargo Center				
15	March 28, 2020	Colorado Mammoth	Nassau Coliseum				
16	April 5, 2020	Toronto Rock	Nassau Coliseum				
17	April 11, 2020	New England Black Wolves	Nassau Coliseum				
18	April 18, 2020	@ Buffalo Bandits	KeyBank Center				

== Roster ==
New York Riptide roster
Active (21-man) roster		Inactive roster	Coaches
Goaltenders: 12 (Haudenosaunee) Gowah Abrams; 30 (Canada) Steve Orleman; Defensemen: 20 (Canada) Leo Stouros; 25 (Canada) Scott Dominey; 27 (Canada) Darryl Robertson; 44 (Canada) Matt Marinier; 45 (Canada) Damon Edwards; 58 (Canada) Andrew Borgatti; 75 (Canada) Jay Thorimbert	Forwards: 4 (Canada) Dan Lomas; 9 (Canada) Reilly O'Connor; 23 (Canada) Tyler Digby; 51 (Canada) Jeff Teat; 68 (Haudenosaunee) Larson Sundown; 92 (Canada) Connor Kearnan; 98 (Canada) Callum Crawford; Transition: 8 (United States) Kevin Brownell; 15 (Canada) Brent Noseworthy; 19 (Canada) Jordi Jones-Smith; 88 (United States) Ron John	Practice squad: 16 (Canada) Jack Kelly; 20 (Canada) Tyler Davis; 33 (Canada) Mackenzie Mitchell; 96 (Canada) Mason Kamminga; Injured reserve: (Canada) Chad Cummings; 3 (Canada) Dan MacRae; Holdout: (United States) Peter Dearth; (Haudenosaunee) Chris Gray; (United States) Cade van Raaphorst; 84 (United States) Dylan Molloy; Unable to play: (Canada) Justin Tkachuk; 31 (Canada) Will Johnston	Head coach {{{Head Coach}}} Legend: * Suspended list; (C) Captain; (A) Alternate captain; updated 2020-02-15; NLL Transactions

=== Entry draft ===
The 2019 NLL Entry Draft took place on September 17, 2019. The Riptide made the following selections:

Round	Overall	Player	College/Club
1	1	Tyson Gibson	Robert Morris University
1	10	Tyson Bomberry	Syracuse University
2	19	Jake Fox	Johns Hopkins University
2	24	Connor Farrell	Long Island University
2	33	Gale Thorpe	Ohio State University
3	34	John Wagner	Marquette University
3	47	Travis Longboat	Six Nations Arrows
4	50	Jack Rowlett	North Carolina University
4	63	Matthew Borges	Ohio State University
5	64	Daylen Hill	Six Nations
6	78	Brad McKinney	Syracuse University
