= 2020 Rochester Knighthawks season =

2020 Rochester Knighthawks
- League: NLL
- Division: North
- 2020 record: 2-10
- Home record: 2-4
- Road record: 0-6
- Goals for: 115
- Goals against: 165
- General Manager: Dan Carey
- Coach: Mike Hasen
- Arena: Blue Cross Arena
- Average attendance: 5,050

The Rochester Knighthawks are a lacrosse team based in Rochester, New York playing in the National Lacrosse League (NLL). The 2020 season will be the team's 1st season in the league. The original Knighthawks moved to Halifax to become the Halifax Thunderbirds. Due to the COVID-19 pandemic, the season was suspended on March 12, 2020. On April 8, the league made a further public statement announcing the cancellation of the remaining games of the 2020 season and that they would be exploring options for playoffs once it was safe to resume play.

== Regular season ==
=== Current standings ===
North Division
P	Team	GP	W	L	PCT	GB	Home	Road	GF	GA	Diff	GF/GP	GA/GP
1	Halifax Thunderbirds	12	8	4	.667	0.0	6–1	2–3	139	126	+13	11.58	10.50
2	Toronto Rock	11	7	4	.636	0.5	4–2	3–2	122	106	+16	11.09	9.64
3	Buffalo Bandits	11	7	4	.636	0.5	4–2	3–2	130	118	+12	11.82	10.73
4	Rochester Knighthawks	12	2	10	.167	6.0	2–3	0–7	115	165	−50	9.58	13.75

East Division
P	Team	GP	W	L	PCT	GB	Home	Road	GF	GA	Diff	GF/GP	GA/GP
1	New England Black Wolves	11	8	3	.727	0.0	4–3	4–0	135	101	+34	12.27	9.18
2	Georgia Swarm	12	7	5	.583	1.5	2–4	5–1	149	126	+23	12.42	10.50
3	Philadelphia Wings	14	8	6	.571	1.5	3–3	5–3	151	134	+17	10.79	9.57
4	New York Riptide	13	1	12	.077	8.0	1–5	0–7	116	177	−61	8.92	13.62

West Division
P	Team	GP	W	L	PCT	GB	Home	Road	GF	GA	Diff	GF/GP	GA/GP
1	Saskatchewan Rush	10	7	3	.700	0.0	2–3	5–0	111	93	+18	11.10	9.30
2	Colorado Mammoth	13	7	6	.538	1.5	4–2	3–4	128	125	+3	9.85	9.62
3	San Diego Seals	12	6	6	.500	2.0	3–3	3–3	138	131	+7	11.50	10.92
4	Calgary Roughnecks	10	5	5	.500	2.0	1–4	4–1	122	111	+11	12.20	11.10
5	Vancouver Warriors	13	4	9	.308	4.5	2–4	2–5	117	160	−43	9.00	12.31

x: Clinched playoff berth; c: Clinched playoff berth by crossing over to another division; y: Clinched division; z: Clinched best regular season record; GP: Games Played
W: Wins; L: Losses; GB: Games back; PCT: Win percentage; Home: Record at Home; Road: Record on the Road; GF: Goals scored; GA: Goals allowed
Differential: Difference between goals scored and allowed; GF/GP: Average number of goals scored per game; GA/GP: Average number of goals allowed per game

== Game log ==
Game	Date	Opponent	Location	Score	OT	Attendance	Record
1	November 30, 2019	Georgia Swarm	Blue Cross Arena	L 4–14		5,642	0–1
2	December 21, 2019	@ Halifax Thunderbirds	Scotiabank Centre	L 12–14		5,278	0–2
3	December 28, 2019	Toronto Rock	Blue Cross Arena	L 11–14		5,036	0–3
4	January 11, 2020	@ Toronto Rock	Scotiabank Arena	L 12–13		8,685	0–4
5	January 18, 2020	Calgary Roughnecks	Blue Cross Arena	W 13–12		4,505	1–4
6	January 19, 2020	@ Philadelphia Wings	Wells Fargo Center (Philadelphia)	L 4–12		7,015	1–5
7	January 31, 2020	@ Buffalo Bandits	KeyBank Center	L 15–16	OT	10,978	1–6
8	February 9, 2020	Vancouver Warriors	Blue Cross Arena	L 10–11	OT	4,063	1–7
9	February 22, 2020	@ New England Black Wolves	Mohegan Sun Arena	L 7–18		5,328	1–8
10	February 29, 2020	New York Riptide	Blue Cross Arena	W 13–12		6,006	2–8
11	March 7, 2020	@ San Diego Seals	Pechanga Arena	L 6–19		6,292	2–9
12	March 8, 2020	@ Colorado Mammoth	Pepsi Center	L 8–10		12,121	2–10

== Cancelled games ==
Game	Date	Opponent	Location	Score	OT	Attendance	Record
13	March 14, 2020	Halifax Thunderbirds	Blue Cross Arena				
14	March 28, 2020	Halifax Thunderbirds	Blue Cross Arena				
15	April 4, 2020	@ Saskatchewan Rush	SaskTel Centre				
16	April 11, 2020	Buffalo Bandits	Blue Cross Arena				
17	April 17, 2020	@ Toronto Rock	Scotiabank Arena				
18	April 25, 2020	Buffalo Bandits	Blue Cross Arena				

== Roster ==
Rochester Knighthawks roster
Active (21-man) roster		Inactive roster	Coaches
Goaltenders: 35 (Canada) Evan Kirk; 49 (Canada) Rylan Hartley; Defensemen: 20 (Canada) Matthew Bennett; 2 (Canada) Paul Dawson (C); 3 (Canada) Thomas Whitty; 18 (Canada) Julian Garritano; 11 (Canada) Darryl Robertson; 34 (Israel) Doug Utting	Forwards: 16 (Canada) Phil Caputo; 19 (Canada) Holden Cattoni; 41 (Canada) Mark Cockerton; 5 (Canada) Turner Evans; 9 (Canada) Curtis Knight (A); 14 (Canada) Dan Lintner; 23 (Canada) Dan Michel; Transition: 83 (Haudenosaunee) Frank Brown; 96 (Canada) Cory Highfield; 17 (Canada) Ryland Rees; 26 (Canada) Thomas Whitty	Practice squad: 29 (Canada) Tyler Biles (T); 21 (Canada) Adam Perroni (T); 72 (Canada) Dustyn Pratt (D); Injured reserve: 91 (Canada) Travis Burton (D); 75 (Canada) Jay Thorimbert (D); Holdout: 45 (Canada) Chris Willman (T); Unable to play: 6 (Canada) Zac Reid (T)	Head coach: Mike Hasen; Assistant coaches Legend: * Suspended list; (C) Captain; (A) Alternate captain; Roster updated 2019-09-18; NLL Transactions

=== Entry Draft ===
The 2019 NLL Entry Draft took place on September 17, 2019. The Knighthawks made the following selections:

Round	Overall	Player	College/Club
1	2	Ryland Rees	Stony Brook University
2	18	Cory Highfield	Massachusetts Lowell University
2	32	Dustyn Pratt	Orangeville Northmen Jr. A
3	35	Thomas Whitty	St. Catharines Athletics Jr. A
3	37	Matt Vangalen	Detroit Mercy University
3	48	Sean Darroch	Lindenwood University
4	49	Tyler Biles	Brampton Excelsiors Jr. A
4	62	Bradley Voigt	Syracuse University
5	65	Carter Badour	College of Saint Rose
6	77	Alec Simons	Mimico Mountaineers Jr. A
