= 2020 Georgia Swarm season =

2020 Georgia Swarm
- League: NLL
- Division: East
- 2020 record: 7-5
- Home record: 2-4
- Road record: 5-1
- Goals for: 149
- Goals against: 126
- General Manager: John J. Arlotta
- Coach: Ed Comeau
- Arena: Infinite Energy Arena

The 2020 Georgia Swarm season is the 5th season of the Georgia Swarm, a lacrosse team based in Duluth, Georgia playing in the National Lacrosse League. The team was formerly based in Saint Paul, Minnesota and was known as the Minnesota Swarm. Due to the COVID-19 pandemic, the season was suspended on March 12, 2020. On April 8, the league made a further public statement announcing the cancellation of the remaining games of the 2020 season and that they would be exploring options for playoffs once it was safe to resume play.

== Regular season ==
=== Current standings ===
North Division
P	Team	GP	W	L	PCT	GB	Home	Road	GF	GA	Diff	GF/GP	GA/GP
1	Halifax Thunderbirds	12	8	4	.667	0.0	6–1	2–3	139	126	+13	11.58	10.50
2	Toronto Rock	11	7	4	.636	0.5	4–2	3–2	122	106	+16	11.09	9.64
3	Buffalo Bandits	11	7	4	.636	0.5	4–2	3–2	130	118	+12	11.82	10.73
4	Rochester Knighthawks	12	2	10	.167	6.0	2–3	0–7	115	165	−50	9.58	13.75

East Division
P	Team	GP	W	L	PCT	GB	Home	Road	GF	GA	Diff	GF/GP	GA/GP
1	New England Black Wolves	11	8	3	.727	0.0	4–3	4–0	135	101	+34	12.27	9.18
2	Georgia Swarm	12	7	5	.583	1.5	2–4	5–1	149	126	+23	12.42	10.50
3	Philadelphia Wings	14	8	6	.571	1.5	3–3	5–3	151	134	+17	10.79	9.57
4	New York Riptide	13	1	12	.077	8.0	1–5	0–7	116	177	−61	8.92	13.62

West Division
P	Team	GP	W	L	PCT	GB	Home	Road	GF	GA	Diff	GF/GP	GA/GP
1	Saskatchewan Rush	10	7	3	.700	0.0	2–3	5–0	111	93	+18	11.10	9.30
2	Colorado Mammoth	13	7	6	.538	1.5	4–2	3–4	128	125	+3	9.85	9.62
3	San Diego Seals	12	6	6	.500	2.0	3–3	3–3	138	131	+7	11.50	10.92
4	Calgary Roughnecks	10	5	5	.500	2.0	1–4	4–1	122	111	+11	12.20	11.10
5	Vancouver Warriors	13	4	9	.308	4.5	2–4	2–5	117	160	−43	9.00	12.31

x: Clinched playoff berth; c: Clinched playoff berth by crossing over to another division; y: Clinched division; z: Clinched best regular season record; GP: Games Played
W: Wins; L: Losses; GB: Games back; PCT: Win percentage; Home: Record at Home; Road: Record on the Road; GF: Goals scored; GA: Goals allowed
Differential: Difference between goals scored and allowed; GF/GP: Average number of goals scored per game; GA/GP: Average number of goals allowed per game

== Game log ==
Game	Date	Opponent	Location	Score	OT	Attendance	Record
1	November 30, 2019	@ Rochester Knighthawks	Blue Cross Arena	W 14–4		5,642	1–0
2	December 14, 2019	Philadelphia Wings	Infinite Energy Arena	W 12–6		6,301	2–0
3	December 28, 2019	Colorado Mammoth	Infinite Energy Arena	L 11–13		5,724	2–1
4	January 11, 2020	Buffalo Bandits	Infinite Energy Arena	L 10–16		8,585	2–2
5	January 18, 2020	@ New York Riptide	Nassau Coliseum	L 12–13	OT	2,351	2–3
6	January 26, 2020	@ New England Black Wolves	Mohegan Sun Arena	W 11–10	OT	4,737	3–3
7	January 31, 2020	@ Philadelphia Wings	Wells Fargo Center (Philadelphia)	W 12–11		6,679	4–3
8	February 15, 2020	New York Riptide	Infinite Energy Arena	W 14–9		8,591	5–3
9	February 22, 2020	Calgary Roughnecks	Infinite Energy Arena	L 10–15		7,818	5–4
10	February 29, 2020	@ Vancouver Warriors	Rogers Arena	W 14–7		8,250	6–4
11	March 7, 2020	@ New York Riptide	Nassau Coliseum	W 11–7		5,207	7–4
12	March 8, 2020	Philadelphia Wings	Infinite Energy Arena	L 11–12		8,662	7–5

== Game log ==
Game	Date	Opponent	Location	Score	OT	Attendance	Record
13	March 20, 2020	@ Saskatchewan Rush	SaskTel Centre				
14	March 27, 2020	New England Black Wolves	Infinite Energy Arena				
15	April 4, 2020	@ San Diego Seals	Pechanga Arena				
16	April 11, 2020	Toronto Rock	Infinite Energy Arena				
17	April 18, 2020	@ New England Black Wolves	Mohegan Sun Arena				
18	April 19, 2020	Halifax Thunderbirds	Infinite Energy Arena				

== Roster ==
Georgia Swarm roster
Active (21-man) roster		Inactive roster	Coaches
Goaltenders: 29 (Canada) Kevin Orleman; 30 (Canada) Mike Poulin; Defensemen: 10 (Canada) Alex Crepinsek; 33 (United States) Matt Dunn; 45 (Canada) Jason Noble (A); 13 (Canada) Connor Sellars; 25 (Canada) Leo Stouros; 44 (Canada) Chad Tutton; 11 (United States) Joel White; 27 (Canada) Adam Wiedemann	Forwards: 20 (Canada) Jordan Hall; 32 (Canada) Shayne Jackson (A); 3 (Haudenosaunee) Zach Miller; 83 (Haudenosaunee) Randy Staats; 4 (Haudenosaunee) Lyle Thompson; 2 (Haudenosaunee) Miles Thompson; 28 (Haudenosaunee) Zed Williams; Transition: 21 (Haudenosaunee) Brendan Bomberry; 24 (Canada) Jordan MacIntosh (C); 71 (Canada) Ryan MacSpadyen; 15 (Haudenosaunee) Kason Tarbell	Practice squad: 91 (United States) TJ Comizio (D); 34 (Canada) Steven Orleman (G); 16 (United States) Sergio Perkovic (D); Injured reserve: 55 (Canada) Bryan Cole (T); Unable to play: (Canada) Jordan Gillis (D); (Canada) Justin Lemcke (D)	Head coach: Ed Comeau; Assistant coaches: Sean Ferris; Dan Ladouceur; Legend: * Suspended list; (C) Captain; (A) Alternate captain; Roster updated 2019-07-01; NLL Transactions

=== Entry Draft ===
The 2019 NLL Entry Draft took place on September 17, 2019. The Swarm made the following selections:

Round	Overall	Player	College/Club
1	11	Kason Tarbell	Cornell University
1	13	Ryan MacSpadyen	Mercy College
3	44	TJ Comizio	Villanova University
4	55	Gunnar Schimoler	UMBC
5	74	Jordan Gillis	Hamilton Jr. B
5	75	Mikey Herring	Virginia University
