= 2020 New England Black Wolves season =

2020 New England Black Wolves
- League: NLL
- Division: East
- 2020 record: 8-3
- Home record: 4-3
- Road record: 4-0
- Goals for: 135
- Goals against: 101
- General Manager: Chris Seinko
- Coach: Glenn Clark
- Arena: Mohegan Sun Arena

The New England Black Wolves are a lacrosse team based in Uncasville, Connecticut playing in the National Lacrosse League (NLL). The 2020 season was the team's 6th season in the league. Due to the COVID-19 pandemic, the season was suspended on March 12, 2020. On April 8, the league made a further public statement announcing the cancellation of the remaining games of the 2020 season and that they would be exploring options for playoffs once it was safe to resume play.

== Regular season ==
=== Current standings ===
North Division
P	Team	GP	W	L	PCT	GB	Home	Road	GF	GA	Diff	GF/GP	GA/GP
1	Halifax Thunderbirds	12	8	4	.667	0.0	6–1	2–3	139	126	+13	11.58	10.50
2	Toronto Rock	11	7	4	.636	0.5	4–2	3–2	122	106	+16	11.09	9.64
3	Buffalo Bandits	11	7	4	.636	0.5	4–2	3–2	130	118	+12	11.82	10.73
4	Rochester Knighthawks	12	2	10	.167	6.0	2–3	0–7	115	165	−50	9.58	13.75

East Division
P	Team	GP	W	L	PCT	GB	Home	Road	GF	GA	Diff	GF/GP	GA/GP
1	New England Black Wolves	11	8	3	.727	0.0	4–3	4–0	135	101	+34	12.27	9.18
2	Georgia Swarm	12	7	5	.583	1.5	2–4	5–1	149	126	+23	12.42	10.50
3	Philadelphia Wings	14	8	6	.571	1.5	3–3	5–3	151	134	+17	10.79	9.57
4	New York Riptide	13	1	12	.077	8.0	1–5	0–7	116	177	−61	8.92	13.62

West Division
P	Team	GP	W	L	PCT	GB	Home	Road	GF	GA	Diff	GF/GP	GA/GP
1	Saskatchewan Rush	10	7	3	.700	0.0	2–3	5–0	111	93	+18	11.10	9.30
2	Colorado Mammoth	13	7	6	.538	1.5	4–2	3–4	128	125	+3	9.85	9.62
3	San Diego Seals	12	6	6	.500	2.0	3–3	3–3	138	131	+7	11.50	10.92
4	Calgary Roughnecks	10	5	5	.500	2.0	1–4	4–1	122	111	+11	12.20	11.10
5	Vancouver Warriors	13	4	9	.308	4.5	2–4	2–5	117	160	−43	9.00	12.31

x: Clinched playoff berth; c: Clinched playoff berth by crossing over to another division; y: Clinched division; z: Clinched best regular season record; GP: Games Played
W: Wins; L: Losses; GB: Games back; PCT: Win percentage; Home: Record at Home; Road: Record on the Road; GF: Goals scored; GA: Goals allowed
Differential: Difference between goals scored and allowed; GF/GP: Average number of goals scored per game; GA/GP: Average number of goals allowed per game

== Game log ==
Game	Date	Opponent	Location	Score	OT	Attendance	Record
1	December 7, 2019	@ Toronto Rock	Scotiabank Arena	W 12–8		7,158	1–0
2	December 14, 2019	@ Saskatchewan Rush	SaskTel Centre	W 12–8		11,119	2–0
3	December 27, 2019	New York Riptide	Mohegan Sun Arena	W 21–11		6,089	3–0
4	January 18, 2020	Philadelphia Wings	Mohegan Sun Arena	W 8–7	OT	4,084	4–0
5	January 26, 2020	Georgia Swarm	Mohegan Sun Arena	L 10–11	OT	4,737	4–1
6	February 1, 2020	Vancouver Warriors	Mohegan Sun Arena	L 6–10		4,801	4–2
7	February 16, 2020	Philadelphia Wings	Mohegan Sun Arena	L 11–14		5,387	4–3
8	February 22, 2020	Rochester Knighthawks	Mohegan Sun Arena	W 18–7		5,328	5–3
9	February 28, 2020	@ New York Riptide	Nassau Coliseum	W 12–8		3,001	6–3
10	March 1, 2020	Halifax Thunderbirds	Mohegan Sun Arena	W 16–10		5,502	7–3
11	March 7, 2020	@ Philadelphia Wings	Wells Fargo Center (Philadelphia)	W 9–7		8,089	8–3

== Cancelled games ==
Game	Date	Opponent	Location	Score	OT	Attendance	Record
12	March 14, 2020	@ Buffalo Bandits	KeyBank Center				
13	March 15, 2020	Calgary Roughnecks	Mohegan Sun Arena				
14	March 20, 2020	@ San Diego Seals	Pechanga Arena				
15	March 27, 2020	@ Georgia Swarm	Infinite Energy Center				
16	April 4, 2020	@ Colorado Mammoth	Pepsi Center				
17	April 11, 2020	@ New York Riptide	Nassau Coliseum				
18	April 18, 2020	Georgia Swarm	Mohegan Sun Arena				

== Roster ==
New England Black Wolves roster
Active (21-man) roster		Inactive roster	Coaches
Goaltenders: 30 (Canada) Doug Jamieson; 35 (Canada) Ethan Woods; Defensemen: 10 (Haudenosaunee) Adam Bomberry; 22 (Canada) Nick Chaykowsky; 8 (United States) Greg Downing; 19 (Haudenosaunee) Ty Logan; 13 (United States) Brett Manney (C); 21 (Canada) Mackenzie Mitchell; 91 (United States) Joe Nardella; 26 (Canada) Jackson Nishimura; 62 (Canada) Creighton Reid	Forwards: 98 (Canada) Callum Crawford; 78 (Canada) Jordan Durston; 14 (United States) Dave Emala; 42 (Canada) Andrew Kew; 86 (Canada) Stephan Leblanc (A); 9 (Canada) Reilly O'Connor; 44 (Canada) Tanner Thomson; 15 (United States) Joe Resetarits; Transition: 33 (Canada) John LaFontaine (A); 4 (Canada) Anthony Malcom; 17 (Canada) Colton Watkinson	Practice squad: 27 (Canada) Bailey Brown; 21 (Canada) Mike Byrne; 55 (Canada) Joel Tinney	Head coach: Glenn Clark; Assistant coaches: Darryl Gibson; Clem O'Drasio; Legend: * Suspended list; (C) Captain; (A) Alternate captain; Roster updated 2019-09-18; NLL Transactions

=== Entry Draft ===
The 2019 NLL Entry Draft took place on September 17, 2019. The Black Wolves made the following selections:

Round	Overall	Player	College/Club
1	3	Andrew Kew	Tampa University
1	17	Zach Goodrich	Towson University
4	61	Bailey Brown	Toronto Beaches
5	70	Tristan Rai	Lehigh University
6	83	Travis Brown	Orangeville
