= 2020 Calgary Roughnecks season =

2020 Calgary Roughnecks
- League: NLL
- Division: 4 West
- 2020 record: 5-5
- Home record: 1-4
- Road record: 4-1
- Goals for: 122
- Goals against: 111
- General Manager: Mike Board
- Coach: Curt Malawsky
- Captain: Dane Dobbie
- Arena: Scotiabank Saddledome

Team leaders
- Goals: Curtis Dickson (21)
- Assists: Dan Taylor (22)
- Points: Curtis Dickson (41)
- Penalties in minutes: Tyson Bell (32)
- Loose Balls: Zach Currier (108)
- Wins: Christian Del Bianco (5)
- Goals against average: Christian Del Bianco (10.94)

The Calgary Roughnecks are a lacrosse team based in Calgary, Alberta. The team plays in the National Lacrosse League (NLL). The 2020 season is the 19th in franchise history. Due to the COVID-19 pandemic, the season was suspended on March 12, 2020. On April 8, the league made a further public statement announcing the cancellation of the remaining games of the 2020 season and that they would be exploring options for playoffs once it was safe to resume play.

On June 4, the league confirmed that the playoffs would also be cancelled due to the pandemic.

== Final standings ==
North Division
P	Team	GP	W	L	PCT	GB	Home	Road	GF	GA	Diff	GF/GP	GA/GP
1	Halifax Thunderbirds	12	8	4	.667	0.0	6–1	2–3	139	126	+13	11.58	10.50
2	Toronto Rock	11	7	4	.636	0.5	4–2	3–2	122	106	+16	11.09	9.64
3	Buffalo Bandits	11	7	4	.636	0.5	4–2	3–2	130	118	+12	11.82	10.73
4	Rochester Knighthawks	12	2	10	.167	6.0	2–3	0–7	115	165	−50	9.58	13.75

East Division
P	Team	GP	W	L	PCT	GB	Home	Road	GF	GA	Diff	GF/GP	GA/GP
1	New England Black Wolves	11	8	3	.727	0.0	4–3	4–0	135	101	+34	12.27	9.18
2	Georgia Swarm	12	7	5	.583	1.5	2–4	5–1	149	126	+23	12.42	10.50
3	Philadelphia Wings	14	8	6	.571	1.5	3–3	5–3	151	134	+17	10.79	9.57
4	New York Riptide	13	1	12	.077	8.0	1–5	0–7	116	177	−61	8.92	13.62

West Division
P	Team	GP	W	L	PCT	GB	Home	Road	GF	GA	Diff	GF/GP	GA/GP
1	Saskatchewan Rush	10	7	3	.700	0.0	2–3	5–0	111	93	+18	11.10	9.30
2	Colorado Mammoth	13	7	6	.538	1.5	4–2	3–4	128	125	+3	9.85	9.62
3	San Diego Seals	12	6	6	.500	2.0	3–3	3–3	138	131	+7	11.50	10.92
4	Calgary Roughnecks	10	5	5	.500	2.0	1–4	4–1	122	111	+11	12.20	11.10
5	Vancouver Warriors	13	4	9	.308	4.5	2–4	2–5	117	160	−43	9.00	12.31

x: Clinched playoff berth; c: Clinched playoff berth by crossing over to another division; y: Clinched division; z: Clinched best regular season record; GP: Games Played
W: Wins; L: Losses; GB: Games back; PCT: Win percentage; Home: Record at Home; Road: Record on the Road; GF: Goals scored; GA: Goals allowed
Differential: Difference between goals scored and allowed; GF/GP: Average number of goals scored per game; GA/GP: Average number of goals allowed per game

=== Regular season ===
Game	Date	Opponent	Location	Score	OT	Attendance	Record
1	November 29, 2019	@ Vancouver Warriors	Rogers Arena	W 12–7		7,456	1–0
2	December 21, 2019	Colorado Mammoth	Scotiabank Saddledome	L 7–8	OT	12,072	1–1
3	December 27, 2019	@ San Diego Seals	Pechanga Arena	W 16–11		4,088	2–1
4	December 28, 2019	Philadelphia Wings	Scotiabank Saddledome	L 7–8		11,352	2–2
5	January 18, 2020	@ Rochester Knighthawks	Blue Cross Arena	L 12–13		4,505	2–3
6	January 25, 2020	Halifax Thunderbirds	Scotiabank Saddledome	L 12–15		15,362	2–4
7	February 8, 2020	New York Riptide	Scotiabank Saddledome	W 13–9		12,384	3–4
8	February 22, 2020	@ Georgia Swarm	Infinite Energy Arena	W 18–17		7,818	4–4
9	February 29, 2020	San Diego Seals	Scotiabank Saddledome	L 12–13		12,217	4–5
10	March 8, 2020	@ Toronto Rock	Scotiabank Arena	W 13–10		7,826	5–5

=== Cancelled games ===
Game	Date	Opponent	Location	Score	OT	Attendance	Record
11	March 13, 2020	Saskatchewan Rush	Scotiabank Saddledome				
12	March 15, 2020	@ New England Black Wolves	Mohegan Sun Arena				
13	March 20, 2020	@ Colorado Mammoth	Pepsi Center				
14	March 28, 2020	Vancouver Warriors	Scotiabank Saddledome				
15	April 3, 2020	Buffalo Bandits	Scotiabank Saddledome				
16	April 17, 2020	Saskatchewan Rush	Scotiabank Saddledome				
17	April 18, 2020	@ Saskatchewan Rush	SaskTel Centre				
18	April 25, 2020	@ San Diego Seals	Pechanga Arena				

== Roster ==
Calgary Roughnecks roster
Active (21-man) roster		Inactive roster	Coaches
Goaltenders: 35 (Canada) Christian Del Bianco; 00 (Canada) Tyler Richards; Defensemen: 16 (Canada) Mike Carnegie; 11 (Canada) Greg Harnett (A); 81 (Canada) Anthony Kalinich; 68 (Canada) Tyler Pace; 13 (Canada) Eli Salama	Forwards: 21 (Canada) Chris Boushy; 8 (Canada) Carter Dickson; 44 (Canada) Dane Dobbie (A); 18 (Canada) Rhys Duch; 89 (Canada) Riley Loewen; 88 (Canada) Ryan Martel; 68 (Canada) Tyler Pace; 26 (Canada) Dan Taylor; Transition: 94 (Canada) Tyson Bell; 7 (Canada) Tyler Burton; 2 (Canada) Reece Callies; 25 (Canada) Chad Cummings; 77 (Canada) Zach Currier; 3 (Canada) Dan MacRae (C); 22 (Canada) Shane Simpson; 55 (Canada) Mitch Wilde	Practice squad: 41 (Canada) Bob Snider; 47 (Canada) Sean Tyrrell; Injured reserve: 10 (Canada) Curtis Manning; 19 (Canada) Jesse King; Protected list: 14 (Canada) Wesley Berg; 17 (Canada) Curtis Dickson (A)	Head coach: Curt Malawsky; Assistant coaches: Bob McMahon; Rob Williams; Legend: * Suspended list; (C) Captain; (A) Alternate captain; updated 2017-12-09; NLL Transactions

== See also ==
- 2020 NLL season
