= 2020 Vancouver Warriors season =

2023 Vancouver Warriors
- League: NLL
- Division: TBD West
- 2023 record: 4–9
- Home record: 2–4
- Road record: 2–5
- Goals for: 117
- Goals against: 160
- General Manager: Dan Richardson
- Coach: Chris Gill
- Captain: Matt Beers
- Alternate captains: Ian Hawksbee; Logan Schuss
- Arena: Rogers Arena

The Vancouver Warriors is a professional lacrosse team based in Vancouver, British Columbia. The team plays in the National Lacrosse League (NLL). The 2020 season was the 21st in franchise history and the 7th season in Vancouver. The franchise previously played in Everett, Washington, San Jose, and Albany, New York. Due to the COVID-19 pandemic, the season was suspended on March 12, 2020. On April 8, the league made a further public statement announcing the cancellation of the remaining games of the 2020 season and that they would be exploring options for playoffs once it was safe to resume play.

On June 4, the league confirmed that the playoffs would also be cancelled due to the pandemic.

== Regular season ==
=== Final standings ===
North Division
P	Team	GP	W	L	PCT	GB	Home	Road	GF	GA	Diff	GF/GP	GA/GP
1	Halifax Thunderbirds	12	8	4	.667	0.0	6–1	2–3	139	126	+13	11.58	10.50
2	Toronto Rock	11	7	4	.636	0.5	4–2	3–2	122	106	+16	11.09	9.64
3	Buffalo Bandits	11	7	4	.636	0.5	4–2	3–2	130	118	+12	11.82	10.73
4	Rochester Knighthawks	12	2	10	.167	6.0	2–3	0–7	115	165	−50	9.58	13.75

East Division
P	Team	GP	W	L	PCT	GB	Home	Road	GF	GA	Diff	GF/GP	GA/GP
1	New England Black Wolves	11	8	3	.727	0.0	4–3	4–0	135	101	+34	12.27	9.18
2	Georgia Swarm	12	7	5	.583	1.5	2–4	5–1	149	126	+23	12.42	10.50
3	Philadelphia Wings	14	8	6	.571	1.5	3–3	5–3	151	134	+17	10.79	9.57
4	New York Riptide	13	1	12	.077	8.0	1–5	0–7	116	177	−61	8.92	13.62

West Division
P	Team	GP	W	L	PCT	GB	Home	Road	GF	GA	Diff	GF/GP	GA/GP
1	Saskatchewan Rush	10	7	3	.700	0.0	2–3	5–0	111	93	+18	11.10	9.30
2	Colorado Mammoth	13	7	6	.538	1.5	4–2	3–4	128	125	+3	9.85	9.62
3	San Diego Seals	12	6	6	.500	2.0	3–3	3–3	138	131	+7	11.50	10.92
4	Calgary Roughnecks	10	5	5	.500	2.0	1–4	4–1	122	111	+11	12.20	11.10
5	Vancouver Warriors	13	4	9	.308	4.5	2–4	2–5	117	160	−43	9.00	12.31

x: Clinched playoff berth; c: Clinched playoff berth by crossing over to another division; y: Clinched division; z: Clinched best regular season record; GP: Games Played
W: Wins; L: Losses; GB: Games back; PCT: Win percentage; Home: Record at Home; Road: Record on the Road; GF: Goals scored; GA: Goals allowed
Differential: Difference between goals scored and allowed; GF/GP: Average number of goals scored per game; GA/GP: Average number of goals allowed per game

=== Game log ===
Game	Date	Opponent	Location	Score	OT	Attendance	Record
1	November 29, 2019	Calgary Roughnecks	Rogers Arena	L 7–12		7,456	0–1
2	December 14, 2019	New York Riptide	Rogers Arena	W 14–10		5,120	1–1
3	December 29, 2019	San Diego Seals	Rogers Arena	L 10–11	OT	6,125	1–2
4	January 4, 2020	@ Colorado Mammoth	Pepsi Center	L 9–13		11,157	1–3
5	January 10, 2020	@ Philadelphia Wings	Wells Fargo Center	L 10–18		9,676	1–4
6	January 17, 2020	Colorado Mammoth	Rogers Arena	W 7–5		6,450	2–4
7	February 1, 2020	@ New England Black Wolves	Mohegan Sun Arena	W 10–6		4,801	3–4
8	February 7, 2020	Buffalo Bandits	Rogers Arena	L 8–15		7,215	3–5
9	February 9, 2020	@ Rochester Knighthawks	Blue Cross Arena	W 11–10	OT	4,063	4–5
10	February 15, 2020	@ Toronto Rock	Scotiabank Arena	L 7–14		8,401	4–6
11	February 22, 2020	@ San Diego Seals	Pechanga Arena	L 10–15		4,217	4–7
12	February 29, 2020	Georgia Swarm	Rogers Arena	L 7–14		8,250	4–8
13	March 7, 2020	@ Saskatchewan Rush	SaskTel Centre	L 7–17		11,632	4–9

=== Cancelled games ===
Game	Date	Opponent	Location	Score	OT	Attendance	Record
14	March 13, 2020	San Diego Seals	Rogers Arena				
15	March 28, 2020	@ Calgary Roughnecks	Scotiabank Saddledome				
16	April 3, 2020	Halifax Thunderbirds	Rogers Arena				
17	April 17, 2020	@ Colorado Mammoth	Pepsi Center				
18	April 24, 2020	Saskatchewan Rush	Rogers Arena				

== Roster ==
Vancouver Warriors roster
Active (21-man) roster		Inactive roster	Coaches
Goaltenders: 77 (Canada) Aaron Bold; 61 (Canada) Eric Penny; Defensemen: 27 (Canada) Owen Barker; 2 (Canada) Matt Beers (C); 7 (Canada) Tyler Codron; 88 (Canada) Ian Hawksbee (A); 41 (Canada) Reid Mydske; 29 (Canada) Colton Porter; 26 (Canada) Zac Porter; 19 (Canada) Justin Salt; 3 (Canada) Jarrett Toll; 28 (Canada) Dallas Wade	Forwards: 45 (Canada) Keegan Bal; 12 (Canada) Brody Eastwood; 16 (Canada) Mitch Jones; 44 (Canada) Tony Malcom; 11 (Scotland) Jordan McBride; 10 (Canada) Joel McCready; 22 (Canada) James Rahe; 18 (Canada) Logan Schuss (A); Transition: 14 (Canada) Brandon Goodwin	Practice squad: 65 (Canada) Andrew Gallant (G); 5 (Canada) Nate Wade (D)	Head coach: Chris Gill; Assistant coaches: Rory McDade; Clay Richardson; Legend: * Suspended list; (C) Captain; (A) Alternate captain; Roster updated 2019-09-24; NLL Transactions

== See also ==
- 2019 NLL season
