= 1998 Ontario Raiders season =

Team season in the National Lacrosse League

1998 Ontario Raiders
- League: NLL
- Rank: 3rd (tie)
- 1998 record: 6–6
- Home record: 4–2
- Road record: 2–4
- Goals for: 165
- Goals against: 157
- General Manager: John Mouradian
- Coach: Les Bartley
- Captain: Jim Veltman
- Arena: Copps Coliseum
- Average attendance: 4,810

Team leaders
- Goals: Colin Doyle (34)
- Assists: Jim Veltman (40)
- Points: Colin Doyle (61)
- Penalties in minutes: Pat Coyle (48)
- Loose Balls: Jim Veltman (194)
- Wins: Bob Watson (5)

The Ontario Raiders were a lacrosse team based in Hamilton, Ontario playing in the National Lacrosse League (NLL). The 1998 season was the 1st in franchise history.

The Raiders finished in a three-way tie for third in the NLL standings. However, due to their head to head record against the Rochester Knighthawks and Buffalo Bandits, they were seeded in 5th place, just missing the playoffs.

== Regular season ==
=== Conference standings ===
P	Team	GP	W	L	PCT	GB	Home	Road	GF	GA	Diff	GF/GP	GA/GP
1	Philadelphia Wings – xyz	12	9	3	.750	0.0	3–3	6–0	166	148	+18	13.83	12.33
2	Baltimore Thunder – x	12	8	4	.667	1.0	4–2	4–2	184	160	+24	15.33	13.33
3	Rochester Knighthawks – x	12	6	6	.500	3.0	3–3	3–3	168	159	+9	14.00	13.25
4	Buffalo Bandits – x	12	6	6	.500	3.0	4–2	2–4	166	171	−5	13.83	14.25
5	Ontario Raiders	12	6	6	.500	3.0	4–2	2–4	165	157	+8	13.75	13.08
6	New York Saints	12	5	7	.417	4.0	3–3	2–4	167	165	+2	13.92	13.75
7	Syracuse Smash	12	2	10	.167	7.0	2–4	0–6	163	219	−56	13.58	18.25

x: Clinched playoff berth; c: Clinched playoff berth by crossing over to another division; y: Clinched division; z: Clinched best regular season record; GP: Games Played
W: Wins; L: Losses; GB: Games back; PCT: Win percentage; Home: Record at Home; Road: Record on the Road; GF: Goals scored; GA: Goals allowed
Differential: Difference between goals scored and allowed; GF/GP: Average number of goals scored per game; GA/GP: Average number of goals allowed per game

=== Game log ===
Game	Date	Opponent	Location	Score	OT	Attendance	Record
1	January 3, 1998	Rochester Knighthawks	Copps Coliseum	L 14–15	OT	7,536	0–1
2	January 17, 1998	@ Baltimore Thunder	Baltimore Arena	L 10–11	OT	3,815	0–2
3	January 24, 1998	New York Saints	Copps Coliseum	W 13–11		4,078	1–2
4	February 7, 1998	@ Rochester Knighthawks	Rochester Community War Memorial	L 9–14		6,265	1–3
5	February 13, 1998	@ New York Saints	Nassau Coliseum	L 10–11		5,082	1–4
6	February 21, 1998	Buffalo Bandits	Copps Coliseum	W 17–15		5,841	2–4
7	February 28, 1998	Philadelphia Wings	Copps Coliseum	L 11–12	OT	3,446	2–5
8	March 7, 1998	Syracuse Smash	Copps Coliseum	W 15–11		3,416	3–5
9	March 13, 1998	Baltimore Thunder	Copps Coliseum	W 17–14		4,545	4–5
10	March 14, 1998	@ Buffalo Bandits	Marine Midland Arena	L 12–14		11,913	4–6
11	March 27, 1998	@ Syracuse Smash	Onondaga County War Memorial	W 22–21	OT	4,211	5–6
12	April 11, 1998	@ Philadelphia Wings	CoreStates Center	W 15–8		13,495	6–6

== Player stats ==
=== Runners (Top 10) ===
Note: GP = Games played; G = Goals; A = Assists; Pts = Points; LB = Loose Balls; PIM = Penalty minutes

Player	GP	G	A	Pts	LB	PIM
Colin Doyle	12	34	27	61		
Russ Heard	9	21	34	55		
Totals						

=== Goaltenders ===
Note: GP = Games played; MIN = Minutes; W = Wins; L = Losses; GA = Goals against; Sv% = Save percentage; GAA = Goals against average

Player	GP	MIN	W	L	GA	Sv%	GAA
Bob Watson		574	5	5	115	.763	12.02
Totals							

== Awards ==
Player	Award
Colin Doyle	Rookie of the Year Award
Colin Doyle	Rookie of the Month, March
Jim Veltman	Second All-Pro Team
Colin Doyle	Second All-Pro Team
Bob Watson	Second All-Pro Team

== Roster ==
No.		Position	Player
11	(Canada)	Def	Clark, Glenn
2	(Canada)	Def	Coyle, Pat
7	(Canada)	Fwd	Doyle, Colin
25	(Canada)	Fwd	Gill, Chris

No.		Position	Player
8	(Canada)	Fwd	Stroup, Dan
32	(Canada)	Fwd	Veltman, Jim
29	(Canada)	Goalie	Watson, Bob

== See also ==
- 1998 NLL season
