= 2020 NLL season =

- League: National Lacrosse League
- Sport: Indoor lacrosse (box lacrosse)
- Duration: November 29, 2019 — March 12, 2020
- Games: 18
- Teams: 13
- TV partner(s): B/R Live (United States); Twitter and Facebook (Globally)

Draft
- Top draft pick: Tyson Gibson
- Picked by: New York Riptide

Regular season
- Top seed: New England Black Wolves
- Season MVP: Shayne Jackson (Georgia Swarm)
- Top scorer: Callum Crawford (New England Black Wolves)

Playoffs

NLL seasons
- ← 2019 season 2022 season →

The 2020 National Lacrosse League season, formally known as the 2019–2020 season, was the 34th in the history of the NLL. The season began on November 29, 2019, and was scheduled to end with the NLL final in late spring of 2020. However, due to the COVID-19 pandemic, the season was suspended on March 12, 2020. On April 8, the league made a further public statement announcing the cancellation of the remaining games of the 2020 season and that they would be exploring options for playoffs once it was safe to resume play.

This season was the inaugural season for the expansion Knighthawks and Riptide. The former Rochester Knighthawks under owner Curt Styres relocated to Halifax for this season while Pegula Sports and Entertainment took over the Knighthawks moniker with a new expansion team.

With the addition of two teams, the NLL was realigned into a three division league. The five west division teams remained the same but the six east division and two expansion teams were distributed into a north and a new east division. The top-two teams in each division would qualify for the playoffs plus and additional two wild card teams.

== Teams ==
2020 National Lacrosse League
Division	Team	City	Arena	Capacity
North	Buffalo Bandits	Buffalo, New York	KeyBank Center	19,070
North	Halifax Thunderbirds	Halifax, Nova Scotia	Scotiabank Centre	10,500
North	Rochester Knighthawks	Rochester, New York	Blue Cross Arena	10,662
North	Toronto Rock	Toronto, Ontario	Scotiabank Arena	18,800
East	Georgia Swarm	Duluth, Georgia	Infinite Energy Arena	10,500
East	New England Black Wolves	Uncasville, Connecticut	Mohegan Sun Arena	7,074
East	New York Riptide	Uniondale, New York	Nassau Veterans Memorial Coliseum	13,917
East	Philadelphia Wings	Philadelphia, Pennsylvania	Wells Fargo Center	19,306
West	Calgary Roughnecks	Calgary, Alberta	Scotiabank Saddledome	19,289
West	Colorado Mammoth	Denver, Colorado	Pepsi Center	18,007
West	San Diego Seals	San Diego, California	Pechanga Arena	12,920
West	Saskatchewan Rush	Saskatoon, Saskatchewan	SaskTel Centre	15,195
West	Vancouver Warriors	Vancouver, British Columbia	Rogers Arena	18,910

=== Map of teams ===
North Division East Division West Division

== Regular season ==
North Division
P	Team	GP	W	L	PCT	GB	Home	Road	GF	GA	Diff	GF/GP	GA/GP
1	Halifax Thunderbirds	12	8	4	.667	0.0	6–1	2–3	139	126	+13	11.58	10.50
2	Toronto Rock	11	7	4	.636	0.5	4–2	3–2	122	106	+16	11.09	9.64
3	Buffalo Bandits	11	7	4	.636	0.5	4–2	3–2	130	118	+12	11.82	10.73
4	Rochester Knighthawks	12	2	10	.167	6.0	2–3	0–7	115	165	−50	9.58	13.75

East Division
P	Team	GP	W	L	PCT	GB	Home	Road	GF	GA	Diff	GF/GP	GA/GP
1	New England Black Wolves	11	8	3	.727	0.0	4–3	4–0	135	101	+34	12.27	9.18
2	Georgia Swarm	12	7	5	.583	1.5	2–4	5–1	149	126	+23	12.42	10.50
3	Philadelphia Wings	14	8	6	.571	1.5	3–3	5–3	151	134	+17	10.79	9.57
4	New York Riptide	13	1	12	.077	8.0	1–5	0–7	116	177	−61	8.92	13.62

West Division
P	Team	GP	W	L	PCT	GB	Home	Road	GF	GA	Diff	GF/GP	GA/GP
1	Saskatchewan Rush	10	7	3	.700	0.0	2–3	5–0	111	93	+18	11.10	9.30
2	Colorado Mammoth	13	7	6	.538	1.5	4–2	3–4	128	125	+3	9.85	9.62
3	San Diego Seals	12	6	6	.500	2.0	3–3	3–3	138	131	+7	11.50	10.92
4	Calgary Roughnecks	10	5	5	.500	2.0	1–4	4–1	122	111	+11	12.20	11.10
5	Vancouver Warriors	13	4	9	.308	4.5	2–4	2–5	117	160	−43	9.00	12.31

x: Clinched playoff berth; c: Clinched playoff berth by crossing over to another division; y: Clinched division; z: Clinched best regular season record; GP: Games Played
W: Wins; L: Losses; GB: Games back; PCT: Win percentage; Home: Record at Home; Road: Record on the Road; GF: Goals scored; GA: Goals allowed
Differential: Difference between goals scored and allowed; GF/GP: Average number of goals scored per game; GA/GP: Average number of goals allowed per game

== Scoring leaders ==
Note: GP = Games played; G = Goals; A = Assists; Pts = Points; PIM = Penalty minutes; LB = Loose Balls

Player	Team	GP	G	A	Pts	PIM	LB
Callum Crawford	New England Black Wolves	11	33	43	76	2	52
Mitchell Jones	Vancouver Warriors	13	28	46	74	17	89
Shayne Jackson	Georgia Swarm	12	31	42	73	8	65
Kevin Crowley	Philadelphia Wings	14	20	51	71	10	56
Randy Staats	Georgia Swarm	12	22	48	70	17	63
Holden Cattoni	Rochester Knighthawks	12	24	38	62	8	60
Lyle Thompson	Georgia Swarm	12	27	33	60	4	87
Ryan Lee	Colorado Mammoth	13	25	35	60	4	63
Cody Jamieson	Halifax Thunderbirds	12	26	33	59	18	45
Wesley Berg	San Diego Seals	12	19	39	58	4	52

== Leading goaltenders ==
Note: GP = Games played; Mins = Minutes played; W = Wins; L = Losses: GA = Goals Allowed; SV% = Save Percentage; GAA = Goals against average

Player	Team	GP	Mins	W	L	GA	SV%	GAA
Doug Jamieson	New England Black Wolves	11	654	8	3	96	0.828	8.80
Evan Kirk	Saskatchewan Rush	10	563	7	2	87	0.813	9.26
Nick Rose	Toronto Rock	11	656	7	4	103	0.816	9.41
Nick Damude	San Diego Seals	12	292	3	1	46	0.790	9.43
Zach Higgins	Philadelphia Wings	14	800	8	5	126	0.814	9.44

== Awards ==
=== Annual awards ===
References: Winners

Award	Winner	Other Finalists
Most Valuable Player	Shayne Jackson, Georgia Swarm	Callum Crawford, New England Black Wolves; Rob Hellyer, Toronto Rock
Goaltender of the Year	Doug Jamieson, New England Black Wolves	Zach Higgins, Philadelphia Wings; Dillon Ward, Colorado Mammoth
Defensive Player of the Year	Graeme Hossack, Halifax Thunderbirds	Robert Hope, Colorado Mammoth; Kyle Rubisch, Saskatchewan Rush
Transition Player of the Year	Challen Rogers, Toronto Rock	Zach Currier, Calgary Roughnecks; Kiel Matisz, Philadelphia Wings
Rookie of the Year	Tyson Gibson, New York Riptide	Connor Fields, San Diego Seals; Andrew Kew, New England Black Wolves
Sportsmanship Award	Lyle Thompson, Georgia Swarm	Kyle Buchanan, San Diego Seals; Curtis Knight, Rochester Knighthawks
GM of the Year	Paul Day, Philadelphia Wings	Jamie Dawick, Toronto Rock; Rich Lisk, New England Black Wolves
Les Bartley Award	Paul Day, Philadelphia Wings	Mike Accursi, Halifax Thunderbirds; Glenn Clark, New England Black Wolves
Executive of the Year Award	John Catalano, Halifax Thunderbirds	Matt Hutchings, Colorado Mammoth; Rich Lisk, New England Black Wolves
Teammate of the Year Award	Dan Dawson, Toronto Rock (tie); Mike Poulin, Georgia Swarm	John Ranagan, New England Black Wolves
Tom Borrelli Award	Craig Rybczynski	Jake Elliott; Teddy Jenner

== Stadiums and locations ==
Georgia Swarm	New England Black Wolves	New York Riptide	Philadelphia Wings
Gas South Arena	Mohegan Sun Arena	Nassau Coliseum	Wells Fargo Center
Capacity: 11,355	Capacity: 7,700	Capacity: 13,917	Capacity: 19,543

Buffalo Bandits	Halifax Thunderbirds	Rochester Knighthawks	Toronto Rock
KeyBank Center	Scotiabank Centre	Blue Cross Arena	Scotiabank Arena
Capacity: 19,070	Capacity: 10,595	Capacity: 11,200	Capacity: 18,819

Calgary Roughnecks	Colorado Mammoth	San Diego Seals	Saskatchewan Rush	Vancouver Warriors
Scotiabank Saddledome	Ball Arena	Pechanga Arena	SaskTel Centre	Rogers Arena
Capacity: 19,289	Capacity: 18,007	Capacity: 12,920	Capacity: 15,190	Capacity: 18,910

== Attendance ==
Home team	Home games	Average attendance	Total attendance
Calgary Roughnecks	5	12,677	63,387
Buffalo Bandits	6	12,089	72,537
Saskatchewan Rush	5	12,007	60,039
Colorado Mammoth	6	11,586	69,521
Toronto Rock	6	8,339	50,037
Philadelphia Wings	6	8,054	48,325
Halifax Thunderbirds	7	7,642	53,496
Georgia Swarm	6	7,613	45,681
Vancouver Warriors	6	6,769	40,616
New England Black Wolves	7	5,132	35,928
Rochester Knighthawks	5	5,050	25,252
San Diego Seals	6	4,829	28,977
New York Riptide	6	4,157	24,942
League	77	8,035	618,738

== See also ==
- 2020 in sports
