= Clarke Petterson =

Canadian lacrosse player (born 1997)

Personal information
- Nationality: Canadian
- Born: August 23, 1997 (age 29)
- Height: 5 ft 11 in (180 cm)
- Weight: 190 lb (86 kg; 13 st 8 lb)

Sport
- Position: Attack (field), Forward (box)
- Shoots: Right
- NCAA team: Cornell University (2019)
- NLL draft: 5th, 2019; Halifax Thunderbirds
- NLL team: Halifax Thunderbirds
- MLL draft: 12th overall, 2019; Boston Cannons
- PLL team Former teams: California Redwoods; New York Atlas
- Pro career: 2019–

Career highlights
- NCAA: Honorable Mention USILA All-American in 2019; Second-team All-Ivy in 2019 and Honorable Mention All-Ivy in 2017
Medal record
Representing Canada
Men's field lacrosse
World Lacrosse Championship
Runner-up	2023 San Diego
Under-19 World Lacrosse Championships
Runner-up	2016 Coquitlam
Men's lacrosse sixes
World Games
Winner	2022 Birmingham

Clarke Petterson (born August 23, 1997) is a Canadian professional lacrosse player with California Redwoods of the Premier Lacrosse League and the Halifax Thunderbirds of the NLL. He attended The Hill Academy in Ontario, Canada, and played collegiate lacrosse at Cornell University.

== College career ==
Petterson was an Honorable Mention All-Ivy in 2017, second-team All-Ivy in 2019, and a USILA All-American in 2019. At Cornell, he was a three-time team captain and was the first sophomore captain in the history of the men’s lacrosse program in 2017. Petterson finished in the top 10 at Cornell for career goals and points and during the 2019 season was ranked second in the nation in shooting percentage (.557), 17th in goals per game (2.93), and 28th in points per game (4.13). During the course of his collegiate career he moved from defensive midfield, to offensive midfield, to attack.

== Professional career ==
With the 5th overall pick in the 2019 Premier Lacrosse League Draft, Petterson was selected by the Redwoods Lacrosse Club. Petterson was also selected by the Boston Cannons with the 12th overall pick in the 2019 Major League Lacrosse draft. He made his first professional start with Redwoods on Sunday, June 2 in a win against the Atlas Lacrosse Club. Petterson was also the 5th overall pick in the 2020 NLL Entry Draft. His first professional indoor lacrosse appearance came on December 21, 2019 with the Thunderbirds. In this first game against the Rochester Knighthawks, Petterson scored a hat trick and was named player of the game.

Petterson was selected by Cannons Lacrosse Club in the PLL Expansion Draft ahead of the 2021 season.

Petterson was claimed off of Atlas' inactive roster by Redwoods on July 5, 2023.

== Statistics ==
=== NLL ===
Clarke Petterson		Regular season									Playoffs								
Season	Team	GP	G	A	Pts	LB	PIM	Pts/GP	LB/GP	PIM/GP	GP	G	A	Pts	LB	PIM	Pts/GP	LB/GP	PIM/GP
2020	Halifax Thunderbirds	11	16	22	38	58	4	3.45	5.27	0.36	–	–	–	–	–	–	–	–	–
2022	Halifax Thunderbirds	17	26	46	72	82	8	4.24	4.82	0.47	1	1	4	5	8	0	5.00	8.00	0.00
2023	Halifax Thunderbirds	18	32	52	84	86	14	4.67	4.78	0.78	1	1	1	2	6	0	2.00	6.00	0.00
2024	Halifax Thunderbirds	18	40	64	104	91	10	5.78	5.06	0.56	1	2	1	3	8	0	3.00	8.00	0.00
		64	114	184	298	317	36	4.66	4.95	0.56	3	4	6	10	22	0	3.33	7.33	0.00
Career Total:		67	118	190	308	339	36	4.60	5.06	0.54									

GP–Games played; G–Goals; A–Assists; Pts–Points; LB–Loose balls; PIM–Penalty minutes; Pts/GP–Points per games played; LB/GP–Loose balls per games played; PIM/GP–Penalty minutes per games played.

=== PLL ===
Season	Team	Regular season											Playoffs										
Season	Team	GP	G	2PG	A	Pts	Sh	GB	Pen	PIM	FOW	FOA	GP	G	2PG	A	Pts	Sh	GB	Pen	PIM	FOW	FOA
2019	Redwoods LC	7	9	0	3	12	22	7	0	0	0	0	–	–	–	–	–	–	–	–	–	–	–
2020	Redwoods LC	6	5	0	4	9	22	9	0	0	0	0	–	–	–	–	–	–	–	–	–	–	–
2022	Atlas LC	1	1	0	1	2	3	1	0	0	0	0	1	1	0	1	2	1	0	0	0	0	0
		14	15	0	8	23	47	17	0	0	0	0	1	1	0	1	2	1	0	0	0	0	0
Career total:		15	16	0	9	25	48	17	0	0	0	0											

GP–Games played; G–Goals; 2PG–2-point goals; A–Assists; Pts–Points; Sh–Shots; GB–Ground balls; Pen–Penalties; PIM–Penalty minutes; FOW–Faceoffs won; FOA–Faceoffs attempted

=== NCAA ===
Season	Team	GP	G	A	GB	Pts
2016	Cornell	13	9	6	15	15
2017	Cornell	13	15	17	22	32
2018	Cornell	18	44	19	21	63
2019	Cornell	15	44	18	26	62
NCAA Totals		59	112	60	84	172
