= Zach Gould =

Canadian lacrosse player

Personal information
- Nickname: Gouldy
- Born: June 20, 1997 (age 29) Saskatoon, Saskatchewan, Canada
- Height: 5 ft 11 in (180 cm)
- Weight: 182 lb (83 kg; 13 st 0 lb)

Sport
- Position: Forward/Transition
- Shoots: Left
- NLL draft: 74th overall, 2018; Saskatchewan Rush
- NLL team: Saskatchewan Rush
- CLA teams: Burnaby Lakers
- Pro career: 2018–

Zach Gould (born June 20, 1997) is a Canadian professional box lacrosse player who currently plays with the Saskatchewan Rush of the National Lacrosse League (NLL). He was the first Saskatchewan-born player to sign a long-term contract in the NLL.

== Professional career ==
He was drafted in 2018 74th overall by the Saskatchewan Rush. He scored his first NLL goal on December 18, 2018, in the battle of the prairies against the Saskatchewan's archrivals the Calgary Roughnecks. Gould has played for the Burnaby Lakers of the WLA.
