= Scotiabank Centre =

Multi-purpose facility in Halifax, Canada

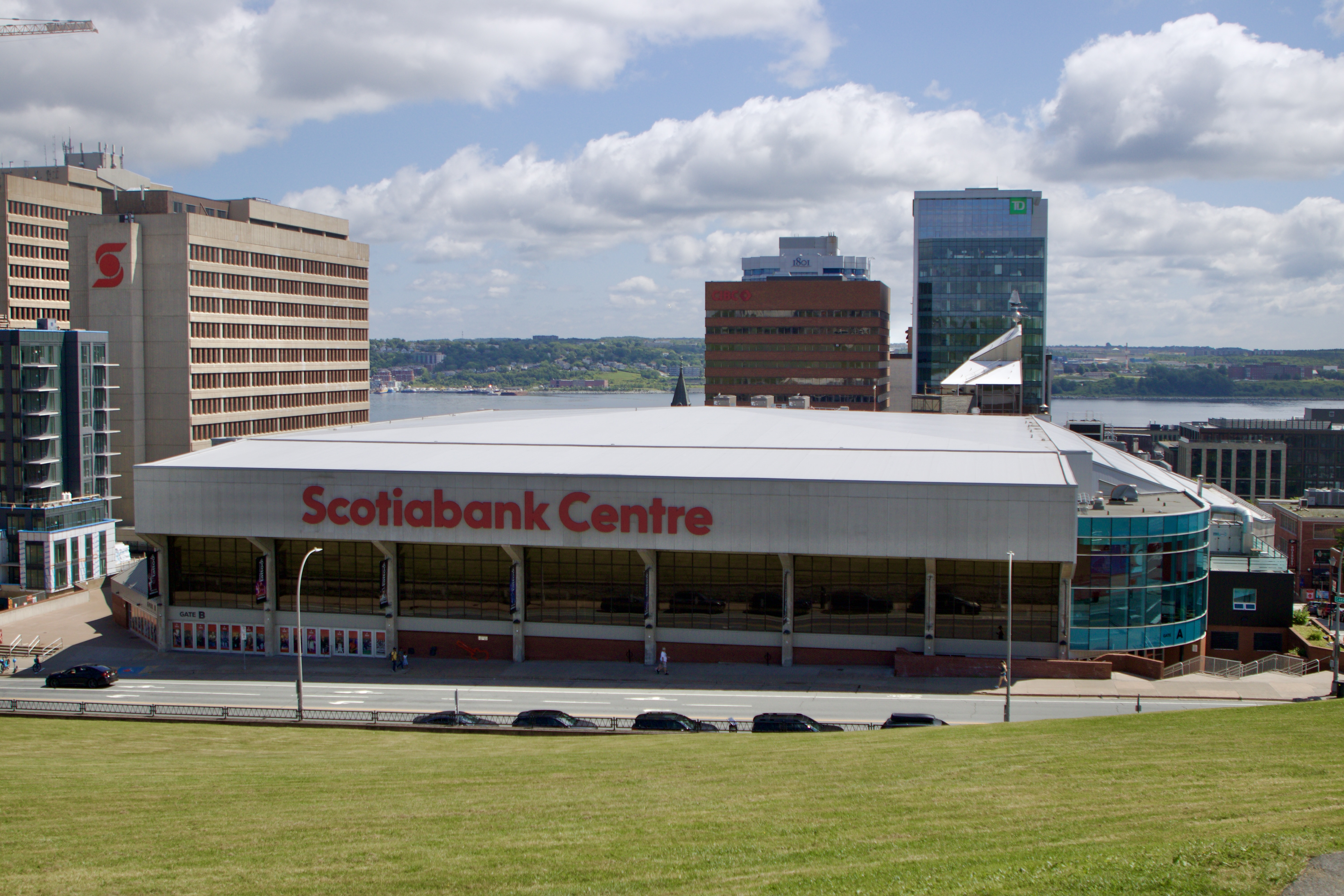
- The facility in 2025

- Location within Nova Scotia Location within Canada
- Former names: Halifax Metro Centre (1978–2014)
- Address: 1800 Argyle Street
- Location: Halifax, Nova Scotia
- Coordinates: 44°38′54″N 63°34′36″W
- Owner: Halifax Regional Municipality
- Capacity: 10,595

Construction
- Groundbreaking: July 1976
- Opened: 17 February 1978

Tenants
- Nova Scotia Voyageurs (AHL) (1978–1984); Nova Scotia Oilers (AHL) (1984–1988); Halifax Citadels (AHL) (1988–1993); Halifax Windjammers (WBL/NBL) (1991–1994); Halifax Mooseheads (QMJHL) (1994–present); Halifax Rainmen (ABA/PBL/NBL Canada) (2007–2015); Halifax Hurricanes (NBL Canada) (2015–2020); Halifax Thunderbirds (NLL) (2019–present)

Scotiabank Centre (formerly known as Halifax Metro Centre) is the largest multi-purpose facility in Atlantic Canada, located in downtown Halifax, Nova Scotia. The main entrances to the building are located on Brunswick Street, at the corner of Duke Street and Carmichael Street, at the foot of Citadel Hill. The building's box office entrance is located on Carmichael Street.

== History ==
The original logo of the Halifax Metro Centre upon opening.

The arena was opened on February 17, 1978, as the Halifax Metro Centre, and was built into the ground to compensate for the steep elevation of the land it occupies. Spectators can see cars at street level, outside, while watching an event.

In December 2007, an Ozzy Osbourne concert sold out in nine minutes, setting a box office ticket record for the Halifax Metro Centre. In July 2008, the Halifax Metro Centre also set a record sell-out (25,000 tickets sold in 40 minutes), for two back-to-back Elton John concerts held in late September 2008. In April 2012, the Halifax Mooseheads sold-out game 6 of the Quebec Major Junior Hockey League semifinals in 20 minutes. On May 9, 2013, QMJHL Presidents Cup final Game 5 sold-out in record time 11 minutes, setting another attendance mark for the Scotiabank Centre.

The facility is owned by the municipality but operated by Events East.

On June 25, 2014, it was announced that Scotiabank had won the naming rights to the facility and that the Metro Centre would be renamed the Scotiabank Centre. The facility officially opened its doors as the rebranded Scotiabank Centre on September 19, 2014.

== Arena information ==
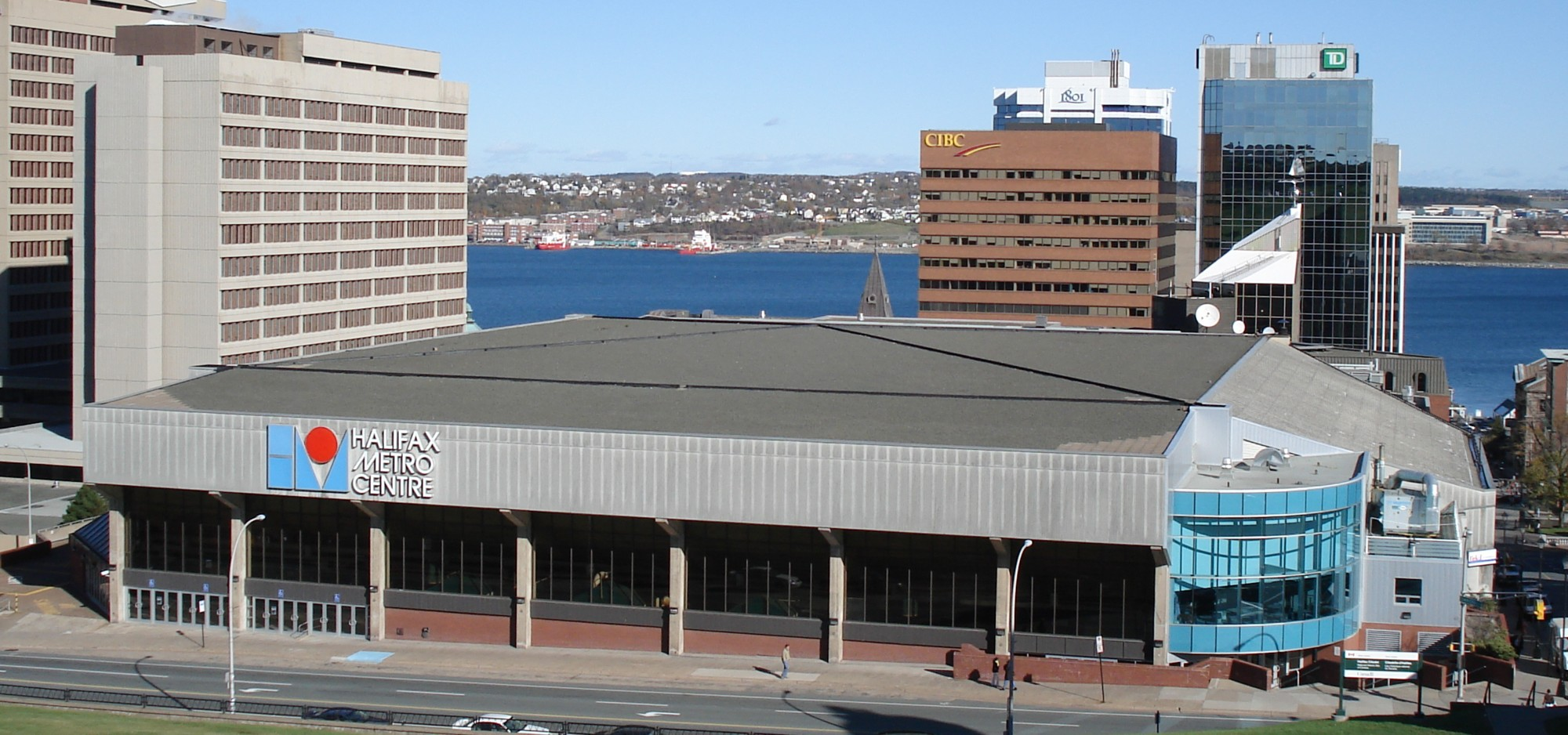
Halifax Metro Centre (now Scotiabank Centre) in 2006.

The Scotiabank Centre originally featured a full ring of bright orange seats around the playing surface, which is known as the "lower bowl". It also has an incomplete "upper bowl" on each side of the arena facing rink-side (court-side) with seats of the same colour. In the mid to late 1990s, there were numerous renovations to the arena, including the addition of 43 SkyBoxes and 11 "Executive Suites". The addition of the SkyBoxes has since partially obscured views for people sitting high up in the upper bowl. Views of some or all of the ice surface from the uppermost rows of seating is either partially or fully blocked by the boxes. To help mitigate this issue, video projection equipment was installed that projects onto the exterior rear walls of the boxes: If a video recording is being produced for an event, then a live feed of the video may be projected for the benefit of people in the obstructed parts of the upper bowl. Before the 2002–03 ice hockey season, in preparation for the World Junior Ice Hockey Championship, a new scoreboard and "SilverVision" LED screens were added. The arena concourses feature photographs of the various events that have taken place at the Scotiabank Centre, with one side featuring entertainment events and the other featuring sporting events. It currently has a seating capacity of 10,595 for ice hockey. The building is connected to the Downtown Halifax Link system.

When the rebranded Scotiabank Centre was unveiled in September 2014, plans to use funding received from the naming rights partnership for capital reinvestment in the facility were also announced. Started from January 2015 to September 2015 the Scotiabank Centre renovated the concessions adding Taste 902, Asian, Links, Donairs, etc. The bathrooms were also renovated, and the original orange seats were replaced with new navy blue ones. The original roof was replaced with a thermoplastic membrane through 2016 to 2017. In the summer of 2018, the original ice-level concrete floor and cooling system was replaced.

== Notable events ==
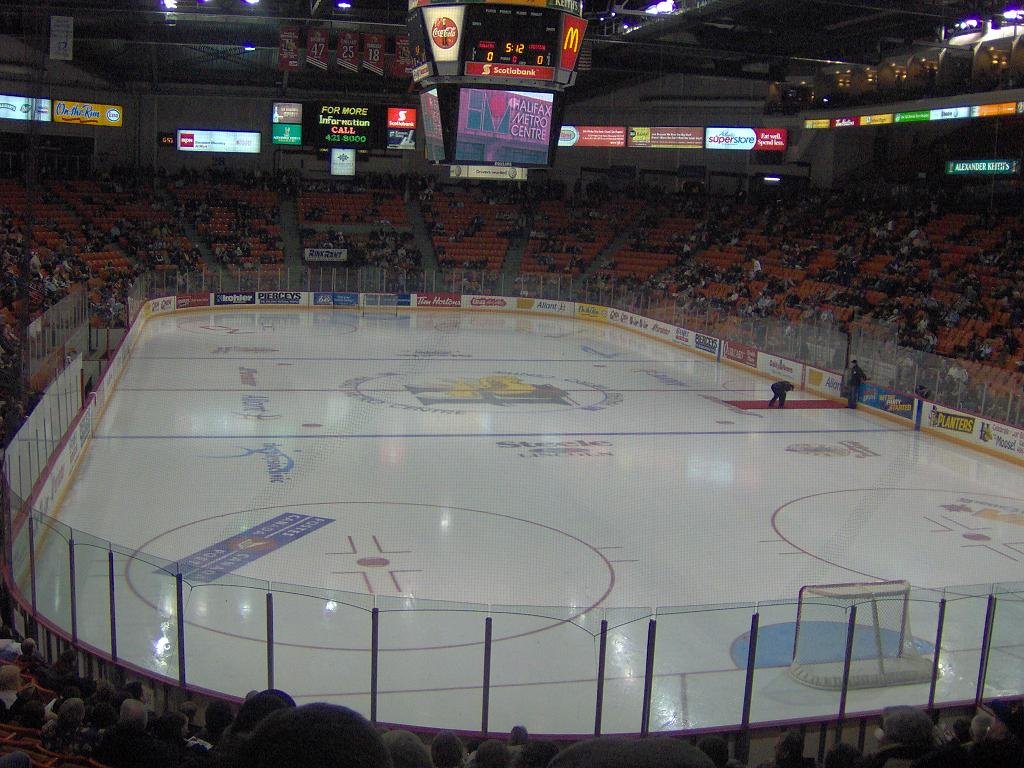
The Scotiabank Centre prior to a Mooseheads game against Lewiston on December 27, 2005

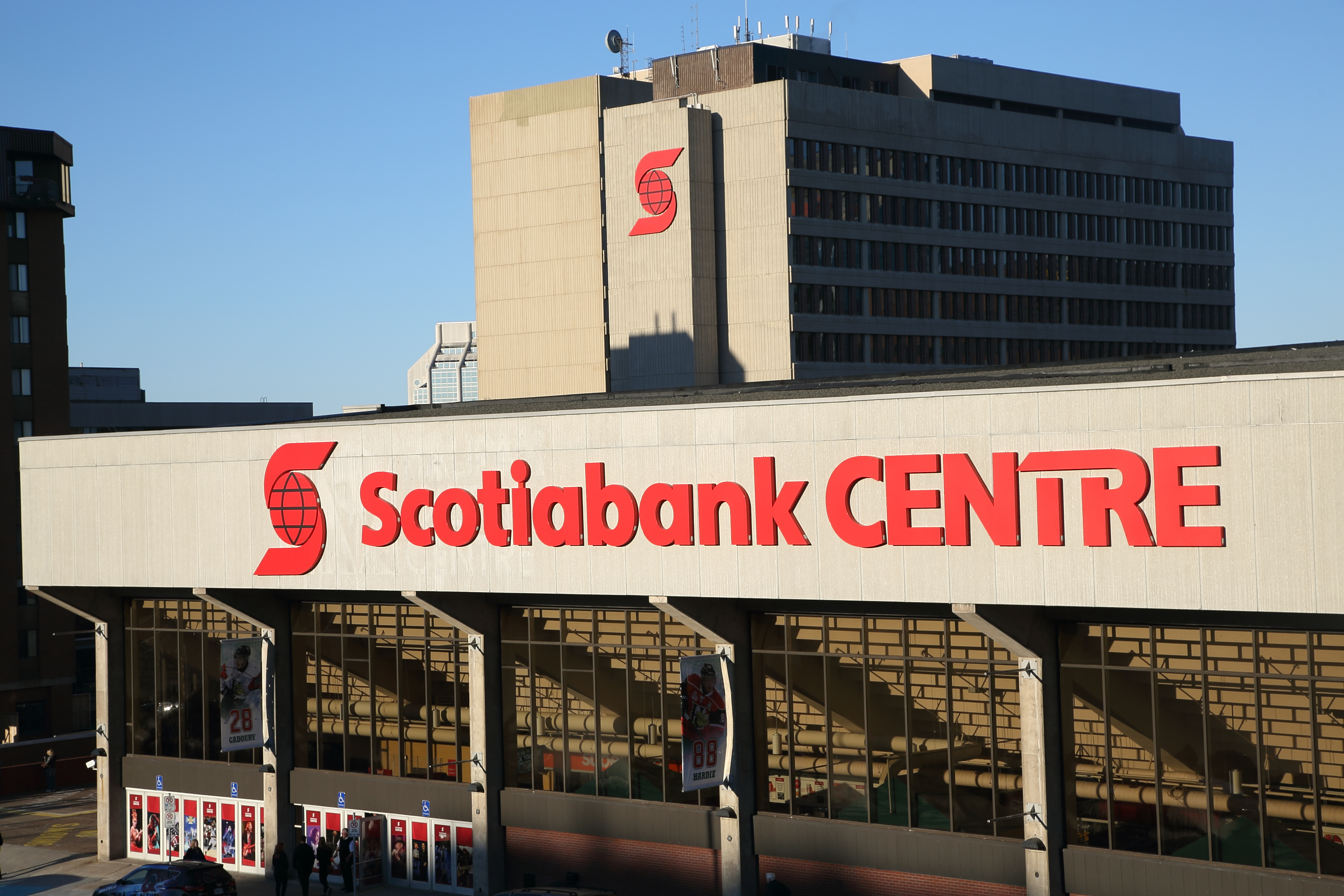
The exterior of Scotiabank Centre in Halifax, photographed in 2014.

- 1978 – Rush – A Farewell to Kings Tour (w/ Max Webster)
- 1978 – Nazareth – Expect No Mercy Tour (w/ The Guess Who)
- 1978 – Gordon Lightfoot
- 1979 – First performance of Royal Nova Scotia International Tattoo; held annually since 1979
- 1979 – Billy Graham – Atlantic Canada Crusade
- 1981 – Ted Nugent
- 1981 – Van Halen - Fair Warning Tour
- 1982 – Loverboy – Get Lucky Tour (w/ Bryan Adams)
- 1983 – Loverboy – Keep It Up Tour (w/ The Headpins)
- 1984 – John Denver
- 1984 – Billy Idol – Rebel Yell Tour (w/ Platinum Blonde)
- 1984 – April Wine – One More for the Road Tour (w/ Corey Hart)
- 1984 – Aerosmith – Back in the Saddle Tour (w/ Honeymoon Suite)
- 1984 – Frank Zappa – Them or Us Tour
- 1984 – Iron Maiden – Powerslave Tour (w/ Twisted Sister)
- 1984 – Krokus (w/ Accept & Rough Cutt)
- 1985 – Tina Turner – Private Dancer Tour
- 1985 – Triumph – Thunder Seven Tour (w/ Helix)
- 1985 – Thompson Twins (w/ OMD)
- 1986 – Kim Mitchell – Shakin' Like a Human Being Tour (w/ Haywire)
- 1986 – George Thorogood (w/ Johnny Winter)
- 1987 – The Cult (w/ Guns N' Roses) – Appetite for Destruction Tour
- 1987 – Triumph – Sport of Kings Tour (w/ Brighton Rock)
- 1987 – Diet Coke International Women's Tennis Tournament
- 1987 – Alice Cooper – Constrictor Tour (w/ Sword)
- 1988 – Alice Cooper – Live In the Flesh Tour (w/ Motörhead)
- 1988 – Stevie Ray Vaughan – Live Alive Tour (w/ The Stray Cats)
- 1988 – Iron Maiden – Seventh Tour of a Seventh Tour (w/ Guns N' Roses)
- 1989 – Metallica – Damaged Justice Tour (w/ Queensrÿche)
- 1989 – Cheap Trick (w/ Eddie Money)
- 1990 – Alice Cooper – Trash Tour (w/ Great White)
- 1990 – World Figure Skating Championships
- 1991 - Paul Simon - The Rhythm of the Saints Tour
- 1991 – Iron Maiden – No Prayer on the Road Tour (w/ Anthrax)
- 1992 – WBL Basketball All Star game
- 1992 – 1992 Scott Tournament of Hearts
- 1993 – Metallica – Nowhere Else To Roam Tour
- 1993 - Bon Jovi - I'll Sleep When I'm Dead Tour
- 1993 – WWF Superstars of Wrestling TV Tapings
- 1993 – Aerosmith – Get a Grip Tour (w/ Too Many Cooks)
- 1995 – 1995 Labatt Brier Green Day Dookie Tour
- 1996 - Celine Dion - Falling into You: Around the World
- 1996 – Alan Jackson (w/ Faith Hill)
- 1996 – Garth Brooks – The Garth Brooks World Tour
- 1996 – Anne Murray - This show was taped for DVD and CD An Intimate Evening with Anne Murray
- 1997 – WWE Raw Live TV Tapings
- 1997 – Backstreet Boys – Backstreet's Back Tour
- 1998 – Our Lady Peace (w/ Everclear)
- 1998 – Celine Dion – Let's Talk About Love World Tour
- 1998 – Van Morrison
- 1999 – Alanis Morissette (w/ Crash Test Dummies)
- 1999 – The Tragically Hip – Phantom Power Tour (w/ By Divine Right)
- 2000 – Canadian Hockey League 2000 Memorial Cup
- 2002 – Nelly Furtado
- 2003 – 2003 World Junior Ice Hockey Championships
- 2003 – 2003 Nokia Brier
- 2003 – WWE Raw & Smackdown T.V. Tapings
- 2004 – 2004 IIHF Women's World Championship
- 2004 – Cher – Living Proof: The Farewell Tour (w/ Tommy Drake)
- 2004 – Nickelback (w/ Three Days Grace and The Trews)
- 2004 – Kid Rock – Rock N Roll Pain Train Tour
- 2005 – Pearl Jam – North American Tour (w/ Sleater-Kinney)
- 2005 – 50 Cent (w/ Kardinal Offishall)
- 2005 – Canadian Olympic Curling Trials
- 2006 - Hilary Duff
- 2006 – 2006 Juno Awards
- 2006 – Dixie Chicks – Accidents & Accusations Tour
- 2007 – Cirque Du Soleil – Saltimbanco Guns N' Roses
- 2007 – Barenaked Ladies – Barenaked Ladies Are Me (B.L.A.M.) Tour
- 2008 – Ozzy Osbourne – Black Rain Tour
- 2008 – Michael Bublé – Irresponsible Tour
- 2008 – 2008 IIHF World Championship
- 2008 – Elton John – Rocket Man: Greatest Hits Live
- 2008 – Neil Young
- 2008 – Carrie Underwood
- 2009 – Stone Temple Pilots
- 2010 – 2010 Tim Hortons Brier
- 2011 – 2011 Canada Winter Games
- 2011 – Heart
- 2011 – Bachman & Turner
- 2011 – Prince – Welcome 2 Tour
- 2011 – Pixies – Doolittle Tour
- 2012 – Tom Petty and the Heartbreakers
- 2013 – CHL/NHL Top Prospects Game
- 2013 – Leonard Cohen
- 2013 – Rush – Clockwork Angels Tour
- 2013 – Kiss – Monster World Tour (w/ Shinedown)
- 2014 – Chicago
- 2014 – George Thorogood and The Destroyers - 40 Years Strong Tour
- 2014 – Black Sabbath – 13 Tour (w/ Reignwolf)
- 2014 – 2014 Davis Cup World Group play-offs
- 2014 – We Day
- 2014 – UFC Fight Night: MacDonald vs. Saffiedine
- 2014 – Alice In Chains
- 2014 – Sarah McLachlan
- 2014 – Bob Seger & The Silver Bullet Band – Ride Out Tour
- 2014 – Backstreet Boys – In A World Like This Tour
- 2015 – 2015 Ford World Men's Curling Championship
- 2015 – Judas Priest – Redeemer of Souls Tour (w/Mastodon)
- 2015 – 2015 CIS University Cup
- 2016 – 2016 CIS University Cup
- 2016 – Carly Rae Jepsen
- 2017 – UFC Fight Night: Lewis vs. Browne
- 2017 – Jim Gaffigan Noble Ape Tour
- 2017 – Canada vs Bahamas men's basketball game for the 2019 FIBA Basketball World Cup qualification
- 2018 – 2018 U Sports Men's Basketball Championship
- 2018 – Jack White
- 2018 – Theory of a Deadman
- 2019 – 2019 U Sports Men's Basketball Championship
- 2019 – Canadian Hockey League 2019 Memorial Cup
- 2019 – Barack Obama
- 2019 – Sum 41
- 2019 – Metric
- 2019 – Daniel Caesar
- 2022 – Sting - My Songs Tour
- 2022 – Avril Lavigne - Bite Me Tour
- 2022 – Trevor Noah - Back to Abnormal World Tour
- 2022 – Simple Plan
- 2023 – 2023 IIHF World Junior Championship * 2023 Shania Twain * Doobie Brothers
- 2024 – 2024 Juno Awards
- 2024 — Billy Idol - Rebel Yell 40th Anniversary Tour (w/ Platinum Blonde)
- 2024 - Arkells- Big Feelings Tour (w/ Joel Plaskett Emergency)
- 2025 — Montreal Victoire vs. Toronto Sceptres Professional Women's Hockey League (PWHL) Takeover Tour.
- 2026 — Ottawa Charge vs. Boston Fleet PWHL Takeover Tour.
- 2027 — Boston Fleet vs. Toronto Sceptres PWHL Takeover Tour.
- 2027 — Hamilton Havoc vs. Ottawa Charge PWHL Takeover Tour.
- 2027 — Vegas Vanguards vs. Vancouver Goldeneyes PWHL Takeover Tour.
