= Halifax Thunderbirds =

NLL professional box lacrosse team in Halifax, Nova Scotia

- Sport: Box lacrosse
- Founded: 1995
- League: National Lacrosse League
- Team history: Rochester Knighthawks (1995–2019); Halifax Thunderbirds (2020-present)
- Location: Halifax, Nova Scotia
- Arena: Scotiabank Centre
- Colours: Purple, Orange, White, Black
- Owner: Curt Styres
- Head coach: Mike Accursi
- General manager: Curt Styres
- Division titles: 1 (2020)
- Playoff berths: 5 (2022, 2023, 2024, 2025, 2026)
- Website: halifaxthunderbirds.com

The Halifax Thunderbirds (known colloquially as the T-Birds) are a Canadian professional box lacrosse team based in Halifax, Nova Scotia, that competes in the National Lacrosse League (NLL). The Thunderbirds play their home games at Scotiabank Centre, which they share with the Halifax Mooseheads of the Quebec Maritimes Junior Hockey League.

== History ==
=== Original Rochester Knighthawks (1995-2019) ===
The franchise began play in 1995 as the Rochester Knighthawks during the Major Indoor Lacrosse League era and first played their home games at Blue Cross Arena in Rochester, New York. The team made the playoffs their first 13 seasons in a row and won 5 championships between 1997 and 2014. In 2018 after losing to the Saskatchewan Rush in the NLL finals, it was announced the franchise would move to Halifax. Franchise owner, Curt Styres sold the team's original name and logo to Terry and Kim Pegula (Owners of Pegula Sports and Entertainment) and relocated the franchise to Halifax.

Following the relocation, PSE founded a new expansion franchise with the same name, who started play the following season. The new franchise based in Rochester is not a continuation of original franchise. All of the original team's championships and records were transferred to Halifax as part of the relocation. The new Knighthawks team also uses a different color scheme and logo than the original franchise.

=== Relocation to Halifax and after ===
On September 13, 2018, the NLL approved a franchise relocation to the city of Halifax. Curt Styres, the previous owner of the NLL's Rochester Knighthawks, moved the Knighthawks' franchise to Halifax, Nova Scotia. The Knighthawks intellectual property (name and logo) was sold to Pegula Sports and Entertainment, owners of the Buffalo Bandits, which founded a new expansion franchise that started play in the 2019–2020 season under the Knighthawks moniker. While located in Rochester the franchise won 5 championships.

The Halifax Thunderbirds made their league debut on December 7, 2019, defeating the New York Riptide 12–4 in front of a crowd of 6,847 at the Scotiabank Centre.

The Thunderbirds made their first playoffs in the 2022 season but were defeated in the first round in overtime 14–13 by their rival, the Toronto Rock.

On February 14, 2026, Maki Jenner did play-by-play for the Thunderbirds in a game in Halifax between them and the Buffalo Bandits, which made her the first woman to do play-by-play for the NLL.

== Team name and logo ==
According to the Toronto Star, Curt Styres got the idea for the team's name when he saw a lacrosse stick made from the wood of a tree that had been struck by lightning and wanted to reflect the "one in one thousand odds" that was the lacrosse stick's embodiement.

== Current roster ==
Halifax Thunderbirds roster
| Active (21-man) roster | | Inactive roster | Coaches |
|---|---|---|---|
| Goaltenders: 35 (Czech Republic) Peter Dubenski; 76 (Haudenosaunee) Warren Hill; Defensemen: 4 (Canada) Graeme Hossack; 7 (Canada) Jordan Stouros; 13 (Canada) Ethan O'Connor; 15 (Canada) Johnny Pearson; 18 (Canada) Jake Withers; 19 (Haudenosaunee) Nonkon Thompson; 27 (Canada) Curtis Romanchych | Forwards: 00 (Canada) Alex Marinier; 11 (Canada) Jason Knox; 16 (Canada) Will MacLeod; 20 (Canada) Mike Robinson; 24 (Canada) Clarke Petterson; 28 (Republic of Ireland) Stephen Keogh; 47 (United States) Cole Kirst; 83 (Canada) Randy Staats; 85 (Haudenosaunee) Wake:Riat Bowhunter; 88 (Haudenosaunee) Cody Jamieson; 91 (Canada) Thomas Hoggarth; Transition: 2 (Canada) Casey Wilson; 8 (United States) Austin Blumbergs; 21 (Haudenosaunee) Brendan Bomberry; 34 (United States) Ryan Terefenko; 44 (Canada) Colton Armstrong | Practice squad: 31 (Canada) Justin Geddie; 42 (Haudenosaunee) Stone Jacobs; 52 (Canada) Brooker Muir; Injured reserve: 9 (Canada) Max Wilson; 19 (Haudenosaunee) Nonkon Thompson; 22 (Canada) Sam La Roue; 59 (Canada) Levi Touhey; 68 (Canada) Trevor Smyth; 77 (Canada) Alex Kew; Holdout: 14 (Canada) Daniel Amesbury | Head coach {{{Head Coach}}} Legend: * Suspended list; (C) Captain; (A) Alternate captain; Roster updated 2026-05-27; NLL Transactions |

== Awards and honours ==
| Year | Player | Award |
|---|---|---|
| 2020 | Graeme Hossack | Defensive Player of the Year |
| 2020 | John Catalano | Executive of the Year |
| 2022 | Pat Gregoire | Tom Borrelli Award |
| 2024 | Jake Withers | Transition Player of the Year |
| 2024 | John Catalano | Executive of the Year |

== All-time record ==
| Season | Division/Conference (Note: Conference play began in the 2022 season) | W–L | Finish | PCT | Home | Road | GF | GA | Avg Attendance | Coach | Playoffs |
|---|---|---|---|---|---|---|---|---|---|---|---|
| 2020 | North | 8–4 | 1st | .667 | 6–1 | 2–3 | 139 | 126 | 7,642 | Mike Accursi | No playoffs held |
| 2021 | Eastern | Season cancelled due to COVID-19 pandemic | | | | | | | | | |
| 2022 | Eastern | 11–7 | 3rd | .611 | 7–2 | 4–5 | 198 | 195 | 5,439 | Mike Accursi | Lost Conference Semi-Final |
| 2023 | Eastern | 10–8 | 3rd | .556 | 5–4 | 5–4 | 238 | 210 | 8,512 | Mike Accursi | Lost Conference Semi-Final |
| 2024 | Unified | 10–8 | 6th | .556 | 6–3 | 4–5 | 223 | 200 | 9,164 | Mike Accursi | Lost Quarterfinals |
| 2025 | Unified | 11–7 | 3rd | .611 | 6–3 | 5–4 | 239 | 213 | 9,789 | Mike Accursi | Lost Semifinals |
| 2026 | Unified | 8–10 | 8th | .444 | 4–5 | 4–5 | 187 | 182 | 10,338 | Mike Accursi | Lost NLL Finals |
| Total | 6 Seasons | 58–44 | | .569 | 34–18 | 24–28 | 1,229 | 1,126 | 8,636 | | |
| Playoff Totals | 5 Appearances | 4–8 | | .333 | 1–2 | 3–6 | 124 | 147 | 10,595 | 0 Championships | |

== Playoff results ==
| Season | Game | Visiting | Home |
|---|---|---|---|
| 2022 | Eastern Conference Semi-Finals | Halifax 13 | Toronto 14 |
| 2023 | Eastern Conference Semi-Finals | Halifax 11 | Toronto 15 |
| 2024 | Quarterfinals | Halifax 3 | Albany 9 |
| 2025 | Quarterfinals | Calgary 12 | Halifax 16 |
| 2025 | Semi Final 1 | Saskatchewan 16 | Halifax 7 |
| 2025 | Semi Final 2 | Halifax 9 | Saskatchewan 10 (OT) |
| 2026 | Quarterfinals | Halifax 10 | Vancouver 7 |
| 2026 | Semi Final 1 | Halifax 12 | Georgia 7 |
| 2026 | Semi Final 2 | Georgia 21 | Halifax 10 |
| 2026 | Semi Final 3 | Halifax 15 | Georgia 11 |
| 2026 | NLL Finals Game 1 | Halifax 11 | Toronto 13 |
| 2026 | NLL Finals Game 2 | Toronto 12 | Halifax 7 |

== Draft history ==
=== NLL entry draft ===
First-round selections

- 2019: Clarke Petterson (5th overall), Trevor Smyth (14th overall)
- 2020: Ethan Riggs (11th overall)
- 2021: Max Wilson (12th overall)
- 2022: Wake:Riat "Bo" Bowhunter (12th overall)
- 2023: None
- 2024: None
- 2025: Alex Marinier (6th overall), Will MacLeod (12th overall)
