= Rochester Knighthawks =

NLL professional box lacrosse team

- Sport: Box lacrosse
- Founded: 2019
- League: National Lacrosse League
- Location: Rochester, New York
- Arena: Blue Cross Arena
- Colors: Purple, Teal, White
- Owner: Seneca Holdings, LLC
- Head coach: Troy Cordingley
- General manager: Dan Carey
- Playoff berths: 3 (2023, 2024, 2025)
- Local media: WHAM-DT2, WNBL, WHTK
- Website: rochesterknighthawks.com

The Rochester Knighthawks (also known as the K-Hawks) are an American professional box lacrosse team based in Rochester, New York, that competes in the National Lacrosse League (NLL). The team plays its home games at Blue Cross Arena.

The Knighthawks are owned by the Seneca Nation of New York, via their subsidiary Seneca Holdings, LLC. They took over in 2025 from previous owner Terry Pegula, who had purchased the intellectual property of the original Knighthawks in 2019.

The new Knighthawks franchise was created to replace the original team, which owner Curt Styres moved to Halifax, Nova Scotia, as the Halifax Thunderbirds at the end of the 2018–2019 season. All records and championships followed the original franchise to Halifax, and the new team uses different colors, mascot, and logo.

== History ==
The original Knighthawks played in Rochester from 1995 until 2019. They began as members of the Major Indoor Lacrosse League from 1995 to 1997 then became members of the NLL beginning with the league's inaugural 1998 season.

The Knighthawks reached the playoffs in each of their first 13 seasons, from 1995 to 2007. This is a league record going back to the league's original creation, the Eagle Pro Box Lacrosse League. The previous record was 11 straight years, held by the Philadelphia Wings. They were also the first NLL team to win three consecutive championships (2012–14).

On September 13, 2018, owner Curt Styres announced that he would be accepting a new team in Halifax, Nova Scotia and would be relocating the Knighthawks' to the city for the winter 2019–2020 season. The Knighthawks intellectual property was sold to Terry and Kim Pegula (the latter of whom was raised in the Rochester suburbs) along with an expansion franchise to ensure Rochester's uninterrupted presence in the league. The original name was used, but the color scheme and logo changed. The team logo, colors, and other officials were announced on May 29, 2019 in an event at Blue Cross Arena. The new franchise does not count as a continuation of the previous franchise. All championships and records were transferred to Halifax.

On June 27, 2019, the Knighthawks named Mike Hasen, who had coached the original Knighthawks since 2011, as head coach, Dan Carey as General Manager, and Pat O'Toole as assistant coach.

On June 23, 2025, it was announced that Pegula would divest ownership of the Knighthawks franchise on June 30. The league worked to find new owners who would keep the team in Rochester, and on August 5, the Seneca Nation of New York announced its acquisition of the team.

On July 20, 2026, the Knighthawks announced that it had officially changed its team colors from army green, gold, and black to purple, teal, and white. These were the same colors used by the original franchise. The franchise says these colors define one of the “most successful eras in Rochester’s history,” and bringing back these colors creates a bridge between the team’s championship heritage and aspirations for the years ahead.

== Current roster ==
Rochester Knighthawks roster
Active (21-man) roster		Inactive roster	Coaches
Goaltenders: 49 (Canada) Rylan Hartley; 1 (Canada) Riley Hutchcraft; Defensemen: 2 (Canada) Paul Dawson (C); 4 (Canada) Ethan Schott; 6 (Canada) Brad Gillies; 8 (Canada) Mitch Ogilvie; 15 (Canada) Matt Bennett; 23 (Canada) Curtis Romanchych; 27 (Canada) Tyler Halls; 29 (Canada) Tyler Biles	Forwards: 5 (Canada) Turner Evans; 7 (Canada) Thomas Vela; 9 (Canada) Curtis Knight (A); 10 (United States) Connor Fields; 18 (Canada) Austin Hasen; 19 (Canada) Holden Cattoni; 43 (Canada) Ryan Smith; 91 (Canada) Thomas Hoggarth; Transition: 17 (Canada) Ryland Rees; 67 (Canada) Jordan Stouros; 81 (Canada) Matt Gilray	Practice squad: 25 (Canada) Parker Pipher (T); 71 (Canada) Jeff Wittig (F); 93 (Canada) Pent Eistrat (F); Injured reserve: 37 (Canada) Dan Coates (D); 96 (Canada) Cory Highfield (T); Unable to play: 3 (Canada) Thomas Whitty (T); 52 (Canada) Carter Schott (T)	Head coach: Mike Hasen; Assistant coaches: Kyle Kallay; Pat O'Toole; Legend: * Suspended list; (C) Captain; (A) Alternate captain; updated 12/5/2023; NLL Transactions

== All-time record ==
Season	Division/Conference (Note: Conference play began in the 2022 season)	W–L	Finish	PCT	Home	Road	GF	GA	Coach	Playoffs
2020	North	2–10	4th	.167	2–3	0–7	115	165	Mike Hasen	No playoffs held
2021	Eastern	Season cancelled due to COVID-19 pandemic								
2022	Eastern	4–14	8th	.222	2–7	2–7	184	221	Mike Hasen	Did not qualify
2023	Eastern	10–8	4th	.556	6–3	4–5	218	214	Mike Hasen	Lost Conference Semi-Final
2024	Unified	8–10	8th	.444	4–5	4–5	214	226	Mike Hasen	Lost Quarterfinals
2025	Unified	10–8	5th	.556	4–5	6–3	228	209	Mike Hasen	Lost Quarterfinals
2026	Unified	6–12	12th	.333	3–6	3–6	205	239	Mike Hasen (5–6) / Randy Mearns (1–6)	Did not qualify
Total	6 seasons	40–62		.392	21–29	19–33	1,164	1,274		
Playoff total	3 appearances	0–3		.000	0–0	0–3	24	44	0 championships	

== Playoff results ==
Season	Game	Visiting	Home
2023	Conference Semi-Final	Rochester 8	Buffalo 20
2024	Quarterfinals	Rochester 6	Toronto 9
2025	Quarterfinals	Rochester 10	Vancouver 15

== Head coaching history ==
#	Name	Term	Regular season				Playoffs			
#	Name	Term	GC	W	L	W%	GC	W	L	W%
1	Mike Hasen	2020–2026	95	39	56	.411	3	0	3	.000
2	Randy Mearns	2026	7	1	6	.143	0	–	–	–
3	Troy Cordingley	2027–	–	–	–	–	–	–	–	–

== Award winners ==
Year	Player	Award
2023	Dan Carey	General Manager of the Year
2025	Connor Fields	Most Valuable Player

== Draft history ==
=== NLL Entry Draft ===
First round selections

- 2019: Ryland Rees (2nd overall)
- 2020: Ryan Smith (3rd overall)
- 2022: Thomas McConvey (1st overall), Austin Hasen (18th overall)
- 2023: Graydon Hogg (15th overall), Ben MacDonnell (16th overall)
- 2024: None
- 2025: Connor Nock (10th overall)
