= Cody Jamieson =

Haudenosaunee lacrosse player

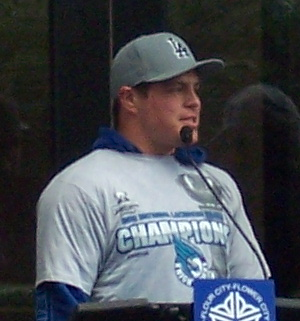
- Jamieson with the Rochester Knighthawks in 2012

Personal information
- Nickname: Jammer
- Nationality: Six Nations of the Grand River
- Born: July 17, 1987 (age 39) Six Nations, Ontario, Canada
- Height: 5 ft 9 in (175 cm)
- Weight: 215 lb (98 kg; 15 st 5 lb)

Sport
- Position: Attack
- Shoots: Left
- NCAA team: Syracuse (2010)
- NLL draft: 1st overall, 2010; Rochester Knighthawks
- NLL team: Halifax Thunderbirds
- MLL draft: 10th overall, 2010; Toronto Nationals
- MLL teams: Toronto/Hamilton Nationals; New York Lizards
- MSL team: Six Nations Chiefs
- Pro career: 2011–

Career highlights
- NCAA: 1x Champion (2009); USILA Honorable Mention All-American (2010); First Team All-Big East (2010); NCAA Tournament All-Tournament Team (2009); NLL: 3x Champion (2012-14); MVP (2014); 2x Champion's Cup MVP (2012-13); 1x First Team All-NLL (2014); 3x Second Team All-NLL (2012, 2015, 2020); International: 2019 World Indoor Lacrosse Championship MVP; 2011 World Indoor Lacrosse Championship Transition Player of the Tournament; 1x All-World Team (2011)

Cody Ryan Jamieson (born July 17, 1987) is a Haudenosaunee professional lacrosse player. He plays for the Halifax Thunderbirds of the National Lacrosse League and the Six Nations Chiefs in Major Series Lacrosse. Jamieson is a former attackman for Syracuse University, where he obtained a degree in Communications.

== National Lacrosse League ==
Jamieson was selected first overall by the Rochester Knighthawks in the 2010 NLL draft. He had 53 points in his rookie season and finished second to Curtis Dickson in the Rookie of the Year voting. Jamieson became the de facto offensive leader of the Knighthawks in his second season, leading the team with 36 goals and 85 points as the Knighthawks captured their third Champion's Cup. Jamieson, with four goals and four assists, was named Championship Game MVP.

A year later, Jamieson won the scoring title with 108 points and 72 assists. He led the Knighthawks to their third straight Championship, making them second in the NLL and top of their Eastern Division. His hard work and achievements were recognized and he was named league MVP in 2014.

On April 11, 2025, Jamieson recorded his 1,000th career NLL point, becoming the first Indigenous player, and 17th overall, to do so.

== Canadian Box career ==
=== Junior ===
During Jamieson's tenure with the Six Nations Arrows Express of the OLA Junior A Lacrosse League, he would help the team to four straight league championships. In 2007, Jamieson would lead an all-star team, which included future NLL players Sid Smith, Shawn Evans and Craig Point, to Six Nations' first Minto Cup national championship in 15 years. Jamieson was also awarded the "Jim McConaghy Memorial Cup" as Series M.V.P.

Jamieson had his best season yet the following year. Jamieson would lead the league in scoring with a career high 59 goals and 101 points, and was awarded the "Green Gael Trophy" as league M.V.P. He was also given the "Jim Veltman Award" as the league's Most Outstanding Player.

Jamieson finished his outstanding junior career with 199 goals and 395 points, as well as 141 goals and 251 points in the playoffs. He is currently ranked 24th all time in goals (regular season and playoffs combined) in Canadian junior lacrosse history with 340.

=== Senior ===
Jamieson scored 48 goals and 96 points during his first season of senior lacrosse with the Six Nations Chiefs. Jamieson became the first player in Major Series Lacrosse history to lead the league in scoring, win the Rookie of the Year and the Most Valuable Player awards all in his rookie season.

== College career ==
=== Onondaga Community College ===
Jamieson began his college career at Onondaga Community College. He began here to get his academic record up to par as to attend Syracuse University and play Division 1 NCAA. During his first year, Jamieson led the Lazers (which included fellow Six Nations players Craig Point and Sid Smith) to an 18–0 undefeated season and a national championship. Jamieson finished his first season second in the league scoring with 57 goals and 121 points.

In 2007, Jamieson led the nation in goals (65), assists (51), and points (116) on the way to a second consecutive undefeated season and national championship. In the 2007 championship game, Jamieson scored 9 goals, and was awarded game M.V.P. honours for a second year in a row. He was named an NJCAA first-team All-American and the NJCAA Offensive Player of the Year.

During the last year of his lacrosse career at Onondaga Community College he received the Tom Longboat Award, given to Canada's top aboriginal athletes. This made him the second lacrosse player from Six Nations to receive this accolade. His career at the college also left a legacy as in 2014 he was added to the college's Alumni Faces display, which stands to recognize alumni for their achievements and contributions to the community. Jamieson was inducted into the OCC Athletic Hall of Fame in 2026.

=== Syracuse University ===
Jamieson transferred to Syracuse in 2008. However, due to academic reasons, Jamieson was not allowed to play until the last few games of the 2009 season. Jamieson played with the Orange during the 2009 NCAA Division I Men's Lacrosse Championship. Syracuse advanced to the championship game. In sudden death overtime of the championship game, Jamieson scored the game-winning goal to give Syracuse their second national championship in a row. He was named to the NCAA championship All-Tournament team after scoring 8 goals in 6 games.

He obtained from his academic career an undergraduate degree in Communications. As the first in his family to achieve a degree in post secondary education, he plans to use his education to help more indigenous youth make it to post secondary education through lacrosse programs.

== Personal life ==
=== Suicide prevention workshops ===
Lacrosse is deeply rooted in Mohawk culture as it is described in their creation story and is the centre of many cultural practices. Using the games significance Jamieson saw an opportunity to tackle an issue ravaging Indigenous communities, suicide among Indigenous youth. Using lacrosse as a basis he created suicide prevention workshops in his community, allowing a way for youth to not only let out pent up emotions but also more importantly to connect with their culture in a meaningful way.

== Statistics ==
=== NLL ===
Cody Jamieson		Regular season									Playoffs								
Season	Team	GP	G	A	Pts	LB	PIM	Pts/GP	LB/GP	PIM/GP	GP	G	A	Pts	LB	PIM	Pts/GP	LB/GP	PIM/GP
2011	Rochester Knighthawks	16	28	25	53	45	30	3.31	2.81	1.88	1	0	3	3	1	0	3.00	1.00	0.00
2012	Rochester Knighthawks	15	36	49	85	56	15	5.67	3.73	1.00	3	8	9	17	7	0	5.67	2.33	0.00
2013	Rochester Knighthawks	16	28	61	89	56	25	5.56	3.50	1.56	3	5	9	14	13	0	4.67	4.33	0.00
2014	Rochester Knighthawks	18	36	72	108	70	26	6.00	3.89	1.44	6	9	13	22	13	4	3.67	2.17	0.67
2015	Rochester Knighthawks	18	36	56	92	67	40	5.11	3.72	2.22	2	2	7	9	9	0	4.50	4.50	0.00
2016	Rochester Knighthawks	18	35	64	99	102	21	5.50	5.67	1.17	–	–	–	–	–	–	–	–	–
2017	Rochester Knighthawks	1	0	2	2	0	0	2.00	0.00	0.00	–	–	–	–	–	–	–	–	–
2018	Rochester Knighthawks	18	26	63	89	75	8	4.94	4.17	0.44	5	9	11	20	16	2	4.00	3.20	0.40
2019	Rochester Knighthawks	18	30	57	87	80	32	4.83	4.44	1.78	–	–	–	–	–	–	–	–	–
2020	Halifax Thunderbirds	12	26	33	59	45	18	4.92	3.75	1.50	–	–	–	–	–	–	–	–	–
2022	Halifax Thunderbirds	16	17	43	60	62	7	3.75	3.88	0.44	1	2	3	5	4	2	5.00	4.00	2.00
2023	Halifax Thunderbirds	18	23	50	73	82	12	4.06	4.56	0.67	1	0	3	3	2	0	3.00	2.00	0.00
2024	Halifax Thunderbirds	18	22	41	63	71	16	3.50	3.94	0.89	1	0	1	1	5	0	1.00	5.00	0.00
2025	Halifax Thunderbirds	15	23	23	46	50	14	3.07	3.33	0.93	3	3	3	6	13	4	2.00	4.33	1.33
2026	Halifax Thunderbirds	18	23	33	56	57	6	3.11	3.17	0.33	6	8	17	25	22	2	4.17	3.67	0.33
		235	389	672	1,061	918	270	4.51	3.91	1.15	32	46	79	125	105	14	3.91	3.28	0.44
Career Total:		267	435	751	1,186	1,023	284	4.44	3.83	1.06									

GP–Games played; G–Goals; A–Assists; Pts–Points; LB–Loose balls; PIM–Penalty minutes; Pts/GP–Points per games played; LB/GP–Loose balls per games played; PIM/GP–Penalty minutes per games played.

=== MLL ===
Season	Team	Regular season											Playoffs										
Season	Team	GP	G	2PG	A	Pts	Sh	GB	Pen	PIM	FOW	FOA	GP	G	2PG	A	Pts	Sh	GB	Pen	PIM	FOW	FOA
2010	Toronto Nationals	1	0	0	0	0	4	3	0	0	0	0	–	–	–	–	–	–	–	–	–	–	–
2011	Hamilton Nationals	11	16	0	10	26	42	11	0	2	0	0	2	2	0	1	3	6	2	0	1	0	0
2012	Hamilton Nationals	9	14	0	11	25	27	12	0	3	0	0	–	–	–	–	–	–	–	–	–	–	–
2013	Hamilton Nationals	9	10	0	13	23	33	18	0	4.5	0	0	1	1	0	1	2	4	2	0	0	0	0
2016	New York Lizards	2	3	0	0	3	6	0	0	0	0	0	–	–	–	–	–	–	–	–	–	–	–
2018	New York Lizards	1	1	0	0	1	4	0	0	0	0	0	–	–	–	–	–	–	–	–	–	–	–
		33	44	0	34	78	116	44	0	9.5	0	0	3	3	0	2	5	10	4	0	1	0	0
Career total:		36	47	0	36	83	126	48	0	10.5	0	0											

GP–Games played; G–Goals; 2PG–2-point goals; A–Assists; Pts–Points; Sh–Shots; GB–Ground balls; Pen–Penalties; PIM–Penalty minutes; FOW–Faceoffs won; FOA–Faceoffs attempted

=== Junior ===
			Regular Season					Playoffs
Season	Team	League	GP	G	A	Pts	PIM	GP	G	A	Pts	PIM
2002	Six Nations Rebels	OLA Jr.B	0	0	0	0	0	1	3	1	4	0
2002	Six Nations Arrows	OLA Jr.A	7	1	3	4	0	0	0	0	0	0
2003	Six Nations Rebels	OLA Jr.B	19	21	18	39	32	15	16	20	36	26
2004	Six Nations Arrows	OLA Jr.A	18	31	25	56	28	14	21	13	34	16
Minto Cup	Six Nations Arrows	CLA	--	--	--	--	--	0	0	0	0	0
2005	Six Nations Arrows	OLA Jr.A	19	26	36	62	19	18	19	21	40	18
Minto Cup	Six Nations Arrows	CLA	--	--	--	--	--	5	10	10	20	0
2006	Six Nations Arrows	OLA Jr.A	21	45	51	96	44	13	17	26	43	18
Minto Cup	Six Nations Arrows	CLA	--	--	--	--	--	5	8	5	13	4
2007	Six Nations Arrows	OLA Jr.A	17	37	39	76	35	15	37	17	54	16
Minto Cup	Six Nations Arrows	CLA	--	--	--	--	--	5	14	9	23	4
2008	Six Nations Arrows	OLA Jr.A	21	59	42	101	36	18	46	31	77	12
Junior A Totals			103	199	196	395	162	78	141	110	251	80
Junior B Totals			19	21	18	39	32	16	19	21	40	26
Minto Cup Totals			--	--	--	--	--	15	32	24	46	8

=== Senior ===
			Regular Season					Playoffs
Season	Team	League	GP	G	A	Pts	PIM	GP	G	A	Pts	PIM
2006	Six Nations Chiefs	MSL	1	1	0	1	2	--	--	--	--	--
2007	Six Nations Chiefs	MSL	3	1	2	3	0	0	0	0	0	0
2008	Six Nations Chiefs	MSL	2	6	1	7	0	0	0	0	0	0
2009	Six Nations Chiefs	MSL	17	48	48	96	16	5	7	10	17	8
Senior A Totals			23	56	51	107	18	5	7	10	17	8

== Awards ==
Preceded by Bob Watson	Champion's Cup MVP; 2012 and 2013	Succeeded by Dan Dawson
Preceded by Shawn Evans	NLL MVP; 2014	Succeeded by Shawn Evans
