= Shawn Evans (lacrosse) =

Canadian lacrosse player (born 1986)

Personal information
- Born: April 28, 1986 (age 40) Peterborough, Ontario, Canada
- Height: 5 ft 9 in (175 cm)
- Weight: 180 lb (82 kg; 12 st 12 lb)

Sport
- Position: Forward
- Shoots: Right
- NLL draft: 2nd overall, 2005; Rochester Knighthawks
- NLL team Former teams: Vancouver Warriors; Rochester Knighthawks; New England Black Wolves; Calgary Roughnecks; Buffalo Bandits; Halifax Thunderbirds
- MSL team: Peterborough Lakers
- Pro career: 2006–2023

Shawn Evans (born April 28, 1986, in Peterborough, Ontario) is a Canadian former professional box lacrosse player who played in the National Lacrosse League, and the Major League Lacrosse. Evans' brothers, Scott and Stephen have also played in the NLL. Evans is one of two lacrosse player in history to win the Minto Cup (the Canadian Junior lacrosse title), the Mann Cup (the Canadian Senior lacrosse title), and the NLL Champion's Cup all within 12 months of each other. He is also only one of three lacrosse players in history (the others being Craig Conn and Mark Matthews) to win 2 Minto Cups back to back (2006 & 2007) with 2 different Junior teams.

In May 2013, after winning the scoring title with 112 points, Evans was named NLL MVP.

== Junior career ==
During his seven-year tenure with the Peterborough Lakers and the Six Nations Arrows, Evans scored 199 goals and 462 points. He also finished his playoff career with 71 goals and 194 points. In combination with his regular season and playoff points, Evans his ranked 29th all time in Canadian Junior A lacrosse history with 656.

Evans' awards and accomplishments during his junior career include:

- 2 Bobby Allan Awards (top scorer) - (2006–2007)
- 2 OLA Jr.A regular season MVP awards - (2006–2007)
- 3 Jim Veltman Awards (Most outstanding player) - (2005–2007)
- 1 OLA Jr.A championship - (2007 with the Six Nations Arrows)
- 2 Minto Cup National Championships - (2006 with the Peterborough Lakers, 2007 with the Six Nations Arrows)
- 1 Minto Cup M.V.P award - (2006)

== College career ==
Evans played a year of NCAA Division I lacrosse at Bellarmine University in 2005. He was the leading freshman scorer that year totalling 53 goals and 21 assists for 74 points.

== Statistics ==
=== NLL ===
Shawn Evans		Regular season									Playoffs								
Season	Team	GP	G	A	Pts	LB	PIM	Pts/GP	LB/GP	PIM/GP	GP	G	A	Pts	LB	PIM	Pts/GP	LB/GP	PIM/GP
2006	Rochester Knighthawks	15	21	16	37	110	59	2.47	7.33	3.93	2	2	2	4	15	0	2.00	7.50	0.00
2007	Rochester Knighthawks	16	32	34	66	121	36	4.13	7.56	2.25	3	3	5	8	32	2	2.67	10.67	0.67
2008	Rochester Knighthawks	15	25	38	63	61	63	4.20	4.07	4.20	–	–	–	–	–	–	–	–	–
2009	Rochester Knighthawks	16	30	49	79	106	42	4.94	6.63	2.63	1	3	2	5	8	0	5.00	8.00	0.00
2010	Rochester Knighthawks	15	11	34	45	100	61	3.00	6.67	4.07	–	–	–	–	–	–	–	–	–
2011	Rochester Knighthawks	16	24	49	73	96	18	4.56	6.00	1.13	1	2	2	4	6	0	4.00	6.00	0.00
2012	Calgary Roughnecks	16	32	47	79	77	65	4.94	4.81	4.06	1	2	4	6	5	14	6.00	5.00	14.00
2013	Calgary Roughnecks	16	32	80	112	69	25	7.00	4.31	1.56	2	4	5	9	7	0	4.50	3.50	0.00
2014	Calgary Roughnecks	18	26	79	105	89	8	5.83	4.94	0.44	5	10	17	27	18	6	5.40	3.60	1.20
2015	Calgary Roughnecks	18	47	83	130	96	39	7.22	5.33	2.17	3	7	10	17	11	4	5.67	3.67	1.33
2016	New England Black Wolves	17	50	68	118	116	39	6.94	6.82	2.29	3	7	9	16	25	19	5.33	8.33	6.33
2017	New England Black Wolves	17	38	65	103	90	50	6.06	5.29	2.94	1	2	0	2	6	4	2.00	6.00	4.00
2018	New England Black Wolves	9	18	33	51	47	8	5.67	5.22	0.89	–	–	–	–	–	–	–	–	–
2018	Buffalo Bandits	8	16	16	32	42	8	4.00	5.25	1.00	–	–	–	–	–	–	–	–	–
2019	Buffalo Bandits	17	28	66	94	69	17	5.53	4.06	1.00	4	8	12	20	14	2	5.00	3.50	0.50
2020	Rochester Knighthawks	9	14	29	43	57	31	4.78	6.33	3.44	–	–	–	–	–	–	–	–	–
2022	Rochester Knighthawks	10	9	38	47	42	12	4.70	4.20	1.20	–	–	–	–	–	–	–	–	–
2022	Halifax Thunderbirds	6	4	14	18	20	4	3.00	3.33	0.67	–	–	–	–	–	–	–	–	–
2023	Vancouver Warriors	16	22	41	63	94	82	3.94	5.88	5.13	–	–	–	–	–	–	–	–	–
		270	479	879	1,358	1,502	667	5.03	5.56	2.47	26	50	68	118	147	51	4.54	5.65	1.96
Career Total:		296	529	947	1,476	1,649	718	4.99	5.57	2.43									

GP–Games played; G–Goals; A–Assists; Pts–Points; LB–Loose balls; PIM–Penalty minutes; Pts/GP–Points per games played; LB/GP–Loose balls per games played; PIM/GP–Penalty minutes per games played.

=== OLA Jr.A ===
			Regular Season					Playoffs
Season	Team	League	GP	G	A	Pts	PIM	GP	G	A	Pts	PIM
2001	Peterborough Lakers	OLA Jr.A	1	0	1	1	0	1	0	0	0	30
2002	Peterborough Lakers	OLA Jr.A	1	2	0	2	0	5	2	4	5	16
2003	Peterborough Lakers	OLA Jr.A	20	32	35	67	60	5	8	13	21	39
2004	Peterborough Lakers	OLA Jr.A	19	44	35	79	61	7	8	15	23	21
2005	Peterborough Lakers	OLA Jr.A	22	47	46	93	69	11	21	21	42	40
2006	Peterborough Lakers	OLA Jr.A	19	38	74	112	93	14	15	40	55	52
Minto Cup	Peterborough Lakers	CLA	--	--	--	--	--	4	14	13	27	8
2007	Six Nations Arrows	OLA Jr.A	18	36	72	108	33	12	17	31	48	61
Minto Cup	Six Nations	CLA	--	--	--	--	--	5	7	18	25	7
Junior A Totals			100	199	263	462	316	55	71	123	194	259
Minto Cup Totals			--	--	--	--	--	9	21	31	52	15

=== MSL ===
			Regular Season					Playoffs
Season	Team	League	GP	G	A	Pts	PIM	GP	G	A	Pts	PIM
2004	Peterborough Lakers	MSL	0	0	0	0	0	1	1	0	1	5
Mann Cup	Peterborough Lakers	CLA	--	--	--	--	--	3	1	1	2	2
2005	Peterborough Lakers	MSL	1	1	1	2	2	7	8	5	14	39
Mann Cup	Peterborough lakers	CLA	--	--	--	--	--	5	5	5	10	6
2006	Peterborough Lakers	MSL	1	2	0	2	0	0	0	0	0	0
Mann Cup	Peterborough Lakers	CLA	--	--	--	--	--	2	3	4	7	8
2008	Peterborough Lakers	MSL	10	17	36	53	41	11	8	14	22	106
2009	Peterborough Lakers	MSL	16	28	40	68	40	15	24	33	57	58
Senior A Totals			28	48	77	125	93	34	42	52	94	208
Mann Cup Totals			--	--	--	--	--	10	9	10	19	16

=== MLL ===
Season	Team	GP	G	2PtG	A	Pts
2017	Chesapeake Bayhawks	4	9	0	5	14
2018	Denver Outlaws	3	5	0	6	11
2019	Boston Cannons	2	1	0	2	3
Total		9	15	0	13	28

== Awards ==
Preceded by John Grant Jr.	NLL Most Valuable Player; 2013	Succeeded by Cody Jamieson
Preceded by Cody Jamieson	NLL Most Valuable Player; 2015	Succeeded by Dhane Smith
