= Sid Smith (lacrosse) =

Haudenosaunee lacrosse player (born 1986)

Personal information
- Nationality: Haudenosaunee
- Born: July 24, 1986 (age 40) Six Nations, Ontario
- Height: 6 ft 0 in (183 cm)
- Weight: 225 lb (102 kg; 16 st 1 lb)

Sport
- Position: Defense
- Shoots: Left
- NLL draft: 1st overall, 2009; Rochester Knighthawks
- NLL team: Rochester Knighthawks
- MLL team: Hamilton Nationals
- MSL team Former teams: Six Nations Chiefs; Syracuse University (NCAA)
- Pro career: 2005–

Sid Smith (born July 24, 1986 in Six Nations, Ontario) is a Haudenosaunee lacrosse player who plays for the Rochester Knighthawks of the National Lacrosse League.

== Junior career ==
Smith played for the Six Nations Arrows of the OLA Junior A Lacrosse League. Smith would lead the Arrows to four straight league championships. Smith won the John "Gus" McCauley Memorial Trophy as the league's Defender of the Year in both 2006 and 2007. In 2006, he also won the Jim Bishop Memorial Award as the Most Sportsmanlike Player in the Minto Cup Tournament. In 2007, Smith won the B.W. "Bill" Evans Award for the league's Top Graduating Player and the Dean McLeod Award as the league's Playoffs Most Valuable Player. Smith also captained the 2007 team to Six Nations' first Minto Cup national championship since 1992.

== College career ==
=== Onondaga Community College ===
Smith began his college career at Onondaga Community College. Smith played alongside fellow Six Nations players Craig Point and Cody Jamieson and led the Lazers to the 2006 NJCAA national championship with an undefeated 18–0 overall record. He was named a 2006 NJCAA First-Team All-American.

=== Syracuse University ===
During his two years with Syracuse (2008–2009), Smith helped the Orange to back-to-back national championships. He was Honorable Mention All-American in 2008 and Second-Team All-American in 2009.

== Professional career ==
=== Major League Lacrosse ===
Smith was drafted sixth overall by the Toronto Nationals in the 2009 Major League Lacrosse Collegiate Draft. As a rookie, he was a member of the 2009 MLL Champion Nationals.

=== National Lacrosse League ===
On September 9, 2009, Smith was selected first overall by the Rochester Knighthawks in the 2009 National Lacrosse League entry Draft.

Smith was a member of the 2012, 2013 and 2014 NLL Champion Rochester Knighthawks and captain of the 2013 and 2014 teams.

=== Canadian Senior "A" ===
Smith was a member of the 2013 Mann Cup Champion Six Nations Chiefs.

== Statistics ==
=== Major League Lacrosse ===
Season	Team	Regular season											Playoffs										
Season	Team	GP	G	2PG	A	Pts	Sh	GB	Pen	PIM	FOW	FOA	GP	G	2PG	A	Pts	Sh	GB	Pen	PIM	FOW	FOA
2009	Toronto Nationals	8	1	0	0	1	1	16	2	2	0	0	2	0	0	0	0	0	4	1	.5	0	0
2011	Hamilton Nationals	2	0	0	0	0	0	0	0	0	0	0	–	–	–	–	–	–	–	–	–	–	–
2013	Hamilton Nationals	8	0	0	0	0	0	9	1	1	0	0	1	0	0	0	0	0	0	0	0	0	0
		18	1	0	0	1	1	25	3	3	0	0	3	0	0	0	0	0	4	1	0.5	0	0
Career total:		21	1	0	0	1	1	29	4	3.5	0	0											

GP–Games played; G–Goals; 2PG–2-point goals; A–Assists; Pts–Points; Sh–Shots; GB–Ground balls; Pen–Penalties; PIM–Penalty minutes; FOW–Faceoffs won; FOA–Faceoffs attempted

Note: Smith was on the Toronto Nationals' roster in 2010, but he did not appear in any games.

=== National Lacrosse League ===
Sid Smith		Regular season									Playoffs								
Season	Team	GP	G	A	Pts	LB	PIM	Pts/GP	LB/GP	PIM/GP	GP	G	A	Pts	LB	PIM	Pts/GP	LB/GP	PIM/GP
2010	Rochester Knighthawks	16	0	1	1	62	15	0.06	3.88	0.94	–	–	–	–	–	–	–	–	–
2011	Rochester Knighthawks	11	0	3	3	39	17	0.27	3.55	1.55	1	0	0	0	2	2	0.00	2.00	2.00
2012	Rochester Knighthawks	15	0	1	1	45	8	0.07	3.00	0.53	3	0	0	0	9	4	0.00	3.00	1.33
2013	Rochester Knighthawks	16	0	3	3	68	14	0.19	4.25	0.88	3	0	3	3	15	0	1.00	5.00	0.00
2014	Rochester Knighthawks	17	1	3	4	87	10	0.24	5.12	0.59	6	0	0	0	20	4	0.00	3.33	0.67
		75	1	11	12	301	64	0.16	4.01	0.85	13	0	3	3	46	10	0.23	3.54	0.77
Career Total:		88	1	14	15	347	74	0.17	3.94	0.84									

GP–Games played; G–Goals; A–Assists; Pts–Points; LB–Loose balls; PIM–Penalty minutes; Pts/GP–Points per games played; LB/GP–Loose balls per games played; PIM/GP–Penalty minutes per games played.

=== Canadian Lacrosse Association ===
Sid Smith - Junior "B"			Regular Season							Playoffs						
Season	Team	League	GP	G	A	Pts	PIM	Pts/GP	PIM/GP	GP	G	A	Pts	PIM	Pts/GP	PIM/GP
2002	Six Nations Rebels	OLA JR B	1	1	1	2	0	2.00	0.00	–	–	–	–	–	–	–
2003	Six Nations Rebels	OLA JR B	16	4	10	14	24	0.88	1.50	12	1	5	6	0	0.50	0.00
			17	5	11	16	24	0.94	1.41	12	1	5	6	0	0.50	0.00
Junior "B" Career Total:			29	6	16	22	24	0.76	0.83							

Sid Smith - Junior "A"			Regular Season							Playoffs						
Season	Team	League	GP	G	A	Pts	PIM	Pts/GP	PIM/GP	GP	G	A	Pts	PIM	Pts/GP	PIM/GP
2002	Six Nations Arrows	OLA JR A	6	0	0	0	0	0.00	0.00	–	–	–	–	–	–	–
2004	Six Nations Arrows	OLA JR A	19	2	14	16	6	0.84	0.32	16	0	8	8	10	0.50	0.63
2005	Six Nations Arrows	OLA JR A	17	3	10	13	10	0.76	0.59	18	0	9	9	22	0.50	1.22
2006	Six Nations Arrows	OLA JR A	20	5	14	19	37	0.95	1.85	13	1	12	13	30	1.00	2.31
2007	Six Nations Arrows	OLA JR A	18	0	8	8	14	0.44	0.78	15	3	11	14	25	0.93	1.67
			80	10	46	56	67	0.70	0.84	62	4	40	44	87	0.71	1.40
Junior "A" Career Total:			142	14	86	100	154	0.70	1.08							

Sid Smith - Senior "A"			Regular Season							Playoffs						
Season	Team	League	GP	G	A	Pts	PIM	Pts/GP	PIM/GP	GP	G	A	Pts	PIM	Pts/GP	PIM/GP
2005	Six Nations Chiefs	MSL	1	0	0	0	0	0.00	0.00	–	–	–	–	–	–	–
2008	Six Nations Chiefs	MSL	4	1	1	2	4	0.50	1.00	3	0	1	1	4	0.33	1.33
2009	Six Nations Chiefs	MSL	10	2	6	8	4	0.80	0.40	5	0	3	3	10	0.60	2.00
2010	Six Nations Chiefs	MSL	5	0	1	1	22	0.20	4.40	11	0	2	2	18	0.18	1.64
2011	Six Nations Chiefs	MSL	10	0	2	2	16	0.20	1.60	9	0	2	2	25	0.22	2.78
2012	Six Nations Chiefs	MSL	10	1	2	3	8	0.30	0.80	10	1	1	2	12	0.20	1.20
2013	Six Nations Chiefs	MSL	17	2	3	5	35	0.29	2.06	14	0	3	3	37	0.21	2.64
			57	6	15	21	89	0.37	1.56	52	1	12	13	106	0.25	2.04
Senior "A" Career Total:			109	7	27	34	195	0.31	1.79							

GP–Games played; G–Goals; A–Assists; Pts–Points; PIM–Penalty minutes; Pts/GP–Points per game; PIM/GP–Penalty minutes per game
