= Whitby Warriors =

Canadian box lacrosse team

- Sport: Box lacrosse
- League: OLA Junior A Lacrosse League
- Based in: Whitby, Ontario
- Arena: Iroquois Park Sports Centre
- Colours: Red, Yellow, and White
- Head coach: Kevin Jenkins
- General manager: Joel Watson/Mark Mason

The Whitby Warriors are a Junior "A" box lacrosse team from Whitby, Ontario, Canada. The Warriors play in the OLA Junior A Lacrosse League.

== History ==
The Whitby Jr Lacrosse Franchise began in 1969 as the Whitby B & R Transporters. The Transporters won the Castrol Cup in 1970 as Canadian Jr B Champions. The Castrol Cup gave way to the Founders Cup in 1972. Whitby B & R Transporters won their 2nd Canadian Jr B Championship Founders Cup in 1974. In 1975, Whitby Warriors came into the OLA Jr A League. The franchise has won the Minto Cup 7-times starting in 1980 known as Whitby C. B. C. Builders. The franchise was known as Whitby First City for 1982 & 1983. Named Whitby Warriors at start of 1984 season. Since then the Warriors have won Minto Cups in 1984, 1985, 1997, 1999, 2011 and 2013.

*2012 Season: The Ontario Lacrosse League implements a goals for/goals against ruling when two teams are tied with the same number of points at the end of the season, AND the two teams have split the outcomes of their own games equally. Whitby was outscored by Six Nations 2 goals between their two games, hence giving Six Nations the 1st place seed in the tie-break and overall OLA-A standings.

*2015 Season: The Whitby Warriors update their team logo. The primary reason for the logo change is that the general manager of the Warriors felt the "logo was very similar to an NBA logo (Golden State Warriors) ..."

== Season-by-season results ==
Note: GP = Games played, W = Wins, L = Losses, T = Ties, Pts = Points, GF = Goals for, GA = Goals against

Season	GP	W	L	T	PTS	GF	GA	Placing	Playoffs
1969	20	9	10	1	19	235	235	4th OLA-B Central	Lost OLA Jr B Playoffs
1970	20	18	1	1	37	424	188	1st OLA-B Central	Lost semi-finals, won Castrol Cup
1971	26	21	4	1	43	429	244	2nd OLA-B Central	Lost quarter-finals
1972	28	25	3	0	50	479	261	1st OLA-B Central	Won League J. A. MacDonald Trophy
1973	24	18	6	0	36	381	219	1st OLA-B Central	OLA Jr B Finalist
1974	25	22	3	0	44	383	226	1st OLA-B Central	Won League, won Founders Cup
1975	28	15	13	0	30	356	367	4th OLA-A	Lost semi-finals
1976	26	18	8	0	36	406	300	2nd OLA-A East	Lost semi-finals
1977	22	19	3	0	38	376	225	1st OLA-A East	Won League, Minto Cup Finalist
1978	30	23	7	0	46	478	346	1st OLA-A East	Won League, Minto Cup Finalist
1979	28	23	5	0	46	495	327	2nd OLA-A East	Lost 1st round
1980	20	17	3	0	34	381	202	1st OLA-A	Won League, won Minto Cup
1981	20	15	5	0	30	400	251	2nd OLA-A	Lost 1st round
1982	20	16	4	0	32	358	211	2nd OLA-A	Lost semi-finals
1983	22	14	7	1	29	287	208	3rd OLA-A	Lost 1st round
1984	24	22	2	0	44	421	199	1st OLA-A	Won League, won Minto Cup
1985	24	19	5	0	38	402	203	1st OLA-A	Won League, won Minto Cup
1986	20	11	9	0	22	207	222	3rd OLA-A	Lost 1st round
1987	25	14	11	0	28	294	258	3rd OLA-A	Lost 1st round
1988	24	14	8	2	30	252	226	3rd OLA-A	OLA Jr A Finalist
1989	24	15	8	1	31	308	242	3rd OLA-A	Lost 1st round
1990	20	10	10	0	20	233	189	3rd OLA-A	Lost semi-finals
1991	20	1	19	0	2	156	325	11th OLA-A	Did Not Qualify
1992	20	6	13	1	13	178	265	10th OLA-A	Did Not Qualify
1993	22	11	11	0	22	220	254	8th OLA-A	Lost 1st round
1994	26	18	8	0	36	360	264	2nd OLA-A East	Lost 1st round
1995	20	17	3	0	34	285	186	2nd OLA-A	Lost semi-finals
1996	20	19	1	0	38	333	142	1st OLA-A	OLA Jr A Finalist
1997	18	16	2	0	32	315	137	1st OLA-A	Won League, won Minto Cup
1998	22	18	4	0	36	309	148	2nd OLA-A	Lost semi-finals
1999	20	19	1	0	38	338	139	1st OLA-A	Won League, won Minto Cup
2000	20	15	5	0	30	188	158	3rd OLA-A	Lost semi-finals
2001	20	12	8	0	24	202	155	5th OLA-A	Lost semi-finals
2002	20	11	8	1	23	173	161	5th OLA-A	Lost 1st round
2003	20	10	9	1	21	171	160	5th OLA-A	Lost semi-finals
2004	20	14	6	0	28	209	144	2nd OLA-A	OLA Jr A Finalist
2005	22	14	7	1	29	192	150	5th OLA-A	Lost 1st round
2006	22	19	3	0	38	231	186	2nd OLA-A	Lost semi-finals
2007	18	10	6	2	22	166	138	4th OLA-A	Lost semi-finals
2008	22	7	14	1	15	159	209	9th OLA-A	Did Not Qualify
2009	22	8	14	0	16	228	232	8th OLA-A	Lost quarterfinals vs Orangeville Northmen
2010	22	17	5	0	34	249	155	3rd OLA-A	Lost semifinals vs Six Nations Arrows
2011	22	16	6	0	32	285	162	3rd OLA-A	Won League, won Minto Cup
*2012	20	17	3	0	34	262	147	2nd OLA-A	Lost semifinals vs Orangeville Northmen
2013	20	15	5	0	30	223	147	2nd OLA-A	Won League, won Minto Cup
2014	20	12	8	0	24	223	177	3rd OLA-A	OLA Jr A Finalist vs Six Nations Arrows
2015	20	9	8	2	20	175	149	4th OLA-A	Lost semifinals vs Six Nations Arrows
2016	20	10	10	0	20	173	162	6th OLA-A	Lost quarterfinals vs Brampton Excelsiors
2017	20	10	9	1	21	202	206	4th OLA-A	Lost semifinals vs Six Nations Arrows
2018	20	12	8	0	24	168	156	5th OLA-A	Lost quarterfinals vs Orangeville Northmen
2019	20	12	7	1	25	180	151	5th OLA-A	Lost quarterfinals vs Brampton Excelsiors
2020	Season cancelled due to COVID-19 pandemic								
2021	8	7	1	0	14	51	37	1st of 5 in East; 1st of 11 in OJLL	Lost semi-final, 7-8 (Excelsiors)
2022	20	14	6	0	28	249	163	3rd OJLL	Won quarterfinals, 3-0 (Athletics) Won semifinals, 3-2 (Northmen) Won finals, 3-0 (Beaches) Won Minto Cup, 2-1 (Miners)
2023	20	9	11	0	18	183	175	6th OJLL	Lost quarterfinals, 3-0 (Mountaineers)
2024	20	9	11	0	18	174	78	9th OJLL	Did Not Qualify
2025	20	14	6	0	28	216	197	3rd OJLL	Won quarterfinals, 3-2 (Athletics) Won semifinals, 4-3 (Beaches) Lost finals, 4-2 (Northmen)
2026	18	12	6	0	24	181	148	1st of 6 in East 4th of 12 in OJLL	Won quarterfinals, 4-2 (Excelsiors) Won semifinals, 4-0 (Buzz) Lost finals, 4-2 (Athletics)
Total	1,224	818	387	18	1,654	15,592	11,312		8 Minto Cup Championships

== Whitby natives and Warrior alumni in the NLL ==
- Zack Greer Duke University (National Freshman of the year), Edmonton Rush
- John LaFontaine, Edmonton Rush Brooklin Redmen
- Gavin Prout, Colorado Mammoth (team captain '06) Brooklin Redmen
- Chris Corbeil, Edmonton Rush (team captain '12) Brooklin Redmen
- Cameron Holding, Colorado Mammoth
- Mark Matthews, Edmonton Rush
- Curtis Knight team captain 2012 and 13 [Guelph] [Edmonton Rush] Brooklin Redmen
- Mike Lum-Walker, Toronto Rock
- Emerson Clark, Buffalo Bandits
- Adrian Sorichetti, Edmonton Rush Brooklin Redmen
- Jason Crosbie, Toronto Rock Brooklin Redmen
- Alexis Buque, Colorado Mammoth
- Joel Watson, Las Vegas Desert Dogs
