= Cory Vitarelli =

Canadian lacrosse player (born 1985)

Personal information
- Nickname: The Dog
- Nationality: Canadian
- Born: June 30, 1985 (age 41) Peterborough, Ontario
- Height: 5 ft 11 in (180 cm)
- Weight: 215 lb (98 kg; 15 st 5 lb)

Sport
- Position: Forward
- Shoots: Left
- NLL draft: 61st overall, 2006; Rochester Knighthawks
- NLL team: Philadelphia Wings
- MSL team: Peterborough Lakers
- Pro career: 2007–

Cory Vitarelli (born June 30, 1985 in Peterborough, Ontario) is a Canadian professional box lacrosse player who plays for the Philadelphia Wings of the National Lacrosse League and the Peterborough Lakers of Major Series Lacrosse. Vitarelli scored the NLL's first ever series-ending overtime goal in a mini-game in the 2014 NLL Playoffs.

== National Lacrosse League career ==
Vitarelli was signed by the Rochester Knighthawks in December 2010, while playing his final season of college hockey at the University of Prince Edward Island with the expectation that he would join the Knighthawks after his team's hockey season concluded. After an unexpected early exit from the playoffs by his college hockey team, Vitarelli made his NLL debut with the Knighthawks on March 26, 2011, scoring 2 goals and assisting on another. He followed that up in his second game a week later with a hat trick. Vitarelli finished his brief 2011 regular season with 7 goals and 6 assists in 6 games played. The Knighthawks won 5 of those 6 games. Vitarelli made his NLL playoff debut with the Knighthawks on May 1, 2011 in a 10–8 loss to the Toronto Rock.

Vitarelli's career-highs for regular-season goals and points came in 2012, when he had 29 goals and 46 points. His career-high for regular-season assists is 19 in 2013.

Vitarelli was a member of the Knighthawks three consecutive Champion's Cup winners in 2012, 2013 and 2014.

== Canadian box lacrosse ==
As a junior, Vitarelli played six years for Peterborough Lakers Jr. A in the Ontario Junior A Lacrosse League from 2001 to 2006. He was a member of their Minto Cup championship team in 2006. Since 2007, Vitarelli has played for the Peterborough Lakers of Major Series Lacrosse. He has been a member of three Mann Cup championship teams with the Lakers in 2007, 2010 and 2012.

== Mann Cup ==
2007 - Member of Peterborough Lakers, winners of the Mann Cup, MSL champions
2010 - Member of Peterborough Lakers, winners of the Mann Cup, MSL champions
2012 - Member of Peterborough Lakers, winners of the Mann Cup, MSL champions
Bible of Lacrosse Player Stats

== Statistics ==
=== National Lacrosse League ===
Cory Vitarelli		Regular season									Playoffs								
Season	Team	GP	G	A	Pts	LB	PIM	Pts/GP	LB/GP	PIM/GP	GP	G	A	Pts	LB	PIM	Pts/GP	LB/GP	PIM/GP
2011	Rochester Knighthawks	6	7	6	13	19	0	2.17	3.17	0.00	1	0	0	0	2	2	0.00	2.00	2.00
2012	Rochester Knighthawks	16	29	17	46	64	10	2.88	4.00	0.63	3	4	3	7	12	2	2.33	4.00	0.67
2013	Rochester Knighthawks	15	25	19	44	75	17	2.93	5.00	1.13	2	2	2	4	5	6	2.00	2.50	3.00
2014	Rochester Knighthawks	14	23	17	40	68	10	2.86	4.86	0.71	6	7	3	10	18	6	1.67	3.00	1.00
		51	84	59	143	226	37	2.80	4.43	0.73	12	13	8	21	37	16	1.75	3.08	1.33
Career Total:		63	97	67	164	263	53	2.60	4.17	0.84									

GP–Games played; G–Goals; A–Assists; Pts–Points; LB–Loose balls; PIM–Penalty minutes; Pts/GP–Points per games played; LB/GP–Loose balls per games played; PIM/GP–Penalty minutes per games played.

=== Canadian Lacrosse Association ===
Cory Vitarelli - Junior "A"			Regular Season							Playoffs						
Season	Team	League	GP	G	A	Pts	PIM	Pts/GP	PIM/GP	GP	G	A	Pts	PIM	Pts/GP	PIM/GP
2001	Peterborough Lakers	OLA JR A	3	0	1	1	0	0.33	0.00	7	1	2	3	15	0.43	2.14
2002	Peterborough Lakers	OLA JR A	16	8	8	16	4	1.00	0.25	10	6	11	17	24	1.70	2.40
2003	Peterborough Lakers	OLA JR A	9	7	17	24	13	2.67	1.44	4	2	3	5	0	1.25	0.00
2004	Peterborough Lakers	OLA JR A	–	–	–	–	–	–	–	6	5	6	11	4	1.83	0.67
2005	Peterborough Lakers	OLA JR A	14	8	14	22	22	1.57	1.57	6	0	4	4	12	0.67	2.00
2006	Peterborough Lakers	OLA JR A	15	13	14	27	16	1.80	1.07	13	17	12	29	16	2.23	1.23
			57	36	54	90	55	1.58	0.96	46	31	38	69	71	1.50	1.54
Junior "A" Career Total:			103	67	92	159	126	1.54	1.22							

Cory Vitarelli - Senior "A"			Regular Season							Playoffs						
Season	Team	League	GP	G	A	Pts	PIM	Pts/GP	PIM/GP	GP	G	A	Pts	PIM	Pts/GP	PIM/GP
2007	Peterborough Lakers	MSL	16	8	10	18	4	1.13	0.25	11	4	3	7	12	0.64	1.09
2008	Peterborough Lakers	MSL	7	9	6	15	0	2.14	0.00	1	1	0	1	0	1.00	0.00
2009	Peterborough Lakers	MSL	14	15	15	30	8	2.14	0.57	15	12	15	27	10	1.80	0.67
2010	Peterborough Lakers	MSL	7	7	9	16	0	2.29	0.00	17	26	17	43	6	2.53	0.35
2011	Peterborough Lakers	MSL	8	8	6	14	17	1.75	2.13	13	9	8	17	14	1.31	1.08
2012	Peterborough Lakers	MSL	13	14	9	23	8	1.77	0.62	16	25	27	52	6	3.25	0.38
2013	Peterborough Lakers	MSL	18	18	25	43	10	2.39	0.56	7	5	10	15	12	2.14	1.71
			83	79	80	159	47	1.92	0.57	80	82	80	162	60	2.03	0.75
Senior "A" Career Total:			163	161	160	321	107	1.97	0.66							

GP–Games played; G–Goals; A–Assists; Pts–Points; PIM–Penalty minutes; Pts/GP–Points per game; PIM/GP–Penalty minutes per game
