= Mike Accursi =

Canadian lacrosse player

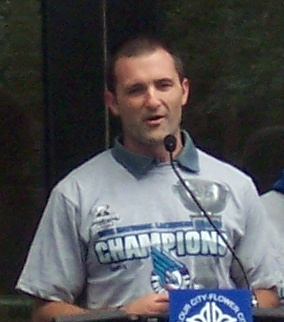
- Accursi with the Rochester Knighthawks in 2012

Personal information
- Nickname: No Mercy
- Born: February 25, 1975 (age 51) Pelham, Ontario, Canada
- Height: 5 ft 11 in (180 cm)
- Weight: 175 lb (79 kg; 12 st 7 lb)

Sport
- Position: Forward
- Shoots: Right
- NLL teams: Rochester Knighthawks; Buffalo Bandits; Edmonton Rush; Syracuse Smash; Ontario Raiders
- Pro career: 1998–2014

Mike Accursi (born February 25, 1975, in Pelham, Ontario) is a Canadian former professional box lacrosse player. He is also a teacher and lacrosse coach at Holy Cross Catholic Secondary School in St. Catharines, Ontario. Accursi professionally coaches currently for the newly relocated lacrosse team, Halifax Thunderbirds of the National Lacrosse League, and has formerly coached for the Rochester Knighthawks.

Accursi has been very successful during his lacrosse career, winning two Champion's Cups in consecutive years with the Rochester Knighthawks and the Buffalo Bandits. He has also won two Mann Cups in the Canadian Lacrosse Association; one with the Brampton Excelsiors (2002) and one with the Peterborough Lakers (2004).

== Junior career ==
For five years, Accursi played for the Burlington Chiefs and the St. Catharines Athletics of the OLA Junior A Lacrosse League. In 1993, Accursi was awarded the "P.C.O. Trophy" for Rookie of the Year.

== Statistics ==
=== NLL ===
		Regular Season						Playoffs
Season	Team	GP	G	A	Pts	LB	PIM	GP	G	A	Pts	LB	PIM
1998	Ontario	12	24	18	42	63	28	--	--	--	--	--	--
1999	Syracuse	11	7	11	18	35	0	--	--	--	--	--	--
2000	Buffalo	12	30	18	48	79	14	1	2	2	4	12	0
2001	Buffalo	14	29	25	54	94	18	--	--	--	--	--	--
2002	Buffalo	16	26	20	46	96	20	--	--	--	--	--	--
2003	Buffalo	15	35	20	55	85	18	2	7	2	9	13	2
2004	Buffalo	16	26	28	54	87	18	3	6	7	13	16	2
2005	Rochester	16	23	48	71	74	12	2	7	1	8	6	0
2006	Rochester	16	27	36	63	61	10	2	0	3	3	10	2
2007	Rochester	16	26	51	77	69	0	3	11	4	15	15	2
2008	Edmonton	9	11	22	33	37	6	--	--	--	--	--	--
2008	Buffalo	4	6	3	9	17	0	3	7	10	17	14	4
2009	Buffalo	16	30	30	60	66	4	2	2	2	4	9	2
2010	Buffalo	15	25	19	44	49	16	1	6	3	9	3	0

=== NLL head coaching statistics ===
Team	Season	Regular Season				Playoffs				Playoff result
Team	Season	GC	W	L	W%	GC	W	L	W%	Playoff result
Halifax Thunderbirds	2020	12	8	4	.667	–	–	–	–	Season suspended due to COVID-19 pandemic
Halifax Thunderbirds	2022	18	11	7	.611	1	0	1	.000	Lost Eastern Conference Semifinal (TOR)
Halifax Thunderbirds	2023	18	10	8	.556	1	0	1	.000	Lost Eastern Conference Semifinal (TOR)
Halifax Thunderbirds	2024	18	10	8	.556	1	0	1	.000	Lost NLL Quarterfinals (ALB)
Halifax Thunderbirds	2025	18	11	7	.611	3	1	2	.333	Lost NLL Semifinals (SSK)
Halifax Thunderbirds	2026	18	8	10	.444	6	3	3	.500	Lost NLL Finals (TOR)
Totals:	6	102	58	44	.569	12	4	8	.333	

=== OLA ===
			Regular Season					Playoffs
Season	Team	League	GP	G	A	Pts	PIM	GP	G	A	Pts	PIM
1992	Burlington Chiefs	OLA Jr.B	12	22	25	47	33	1	1	2	3	2
1992	Burlington Chiefs	OLA Jr.A	11	13	15	28	30	--	--	--	--	--
1993	Burlington Chiefs	OLA Jr.A	21	44	50	94	81	--	--	--	--	--
1994	Niagara Spartan Warriors	OLA Jr.B	8	19	14	33	27	11	26	25	51	28
1995	St. Catharines Athletics	OLA Jr.A	19	18	43	61	52	13	9	24	33	18
1996	St. Catharines Athletics	OLA.Jr.A	20	25	36	61	52	7	7	18	25	18
1997	Niagara Falls Gamblers	MSL	19	11	16	27	43	10	5	10	15	24
Mann Cup	Niagara Falls Gamblers	CLA	--	--	--	--	--	4	0	4	4	2
1998	Buffalo Gamblers	MSL	18	10	25	35	15	10	8	6	14	6
1999	Brampton Excelsiors	MSL	15	19	18	37	20	15	12	27	39	10
Mann Cup	Brampton Excelsiors	CLA	--	--	--	--	--	3	3	1	4	7
2000	Brampton Excelsiors	MSL	13	27	15	42	19	10	10	10	20	23
2001	Akwesasne Thunder	MSL	6	7	8	15	12	--	--	--	--	--
2002	Brampton Excelsiors	MSL	9	8	16	24	6	9	14	14	28	15
Mann Cup	Brampton Excelsiors	CLA	--	--	--	--	--	7	6	9	15	4
2004	Windsor Warlocks	MSL	4	3	4	7	2	--	--	--	--	--
2004	Peterborough Lakers	MSL	4	3	5	8	2	13	25	21	46	2
Mann Cup	Peterborough Lakers	CLA	--	--	--	--	--	6	7	11	18	0
2005	Peterborough Lakers	MSL	4	2	8	10	0	7	6	3	9	2
Mann Cup	Peterborough Lakers	CLA	--	--	--	--	--	2	2	4	6	2
2006	Peterborough Lakers	MSL	4	4	2	6	0	--	--	--	--	--
2006	Brooklin Redmen	MSL	7	10	12	22	4	7	8	9	17	2
2007	Brooklin Redmen	MSL	7	7	10	17	2	--	--	--	--	--
2008	St. Regis Indians	MSL	6	7	10	17	0	9	8	13	21	4
2009	St. Regis Indians	MSL	15	21	20	41	20	9	11	14	25	10
Junior A Totals			71	100	144	244	215	20	16	42	58	36
Junior B Totals			20	41	39	80	60	12	27	27	54	30
Senior A Totals			131	139	169	308	145	99	107	127	234	110
Mann Cup Totals			--	--	--	--	--	22	18	29	47	15
