= Rory Glaves =

Canadian lacrosse player

Personal information
- Born: January 13, 1982 (age 44) Niagara Falls, Ontario, Canada
- Height: 6 ft 0 in (183 cm)
- Weight: 195 lb (88 kg; 13 st 13 lb)

Sport
- Position: Defense
- Shoots: Left
- NLL draft: 2nd overall, 2004; Vancouver Ravens
- NLL teams: Rochester Knighthawks; Edmonton Rush; Anaheim Storm; Vancouver Ravens
- Pro career: 2005–2013

Rory Glaves (born January 13, 1982, in Niagara Falls, Ontario) is a former Canadian professional lacrosse player. Glaves played for the Anaheim Storm, Edmonton Rush and the Rochester Knighthawks of the National Lacrosse League from 2005 to 2013. Glaves also played two years of college lacrosse for the University of Hartford. Glaves has won two Minto Cup championships with the St. Catharines Athletics (2001, 2003) and one Mann Cup championship with the Victoria Shamrocks (2005).

== Junior career ==
Glaves played for the St. Catharines Athletics in the OLA Junior A Lacrosse League from 1999 to 2003. He quickly earned a reputation as one of the best defensive players in the game. In 2003, Glaves was given the "Dean McLeod Award" for Playoffs M.V.P. He was also awarded the "John McCauley Award" for Best Defensive Player two years in a row. During his five-year tenure with the Athletics, Glaves helped lead the team to three straight league championships and two Minto Cups.

== Professional career ==
Glaves was drafted 2nd overall in the 2004 NLL entry draft by the Vancouver Ravens.

Shortly before the beginning of the 2005 NLL season, the Ravens folded, and Glaves was selected second overall in the dispersal draft by the Anaheim Storm.

Glaves played every game for Anaheim. On July 20, 2005, the Storm folded, and Glaves was again put into a dispersal draft. Glaves was selected first overall by the Edmonton Rush. Glaves played his first season in the NLL with the Rush in 2006.

== Hockey career ==
Glaves began his junior hockey career with the Jr.B Niagara Falls Canucks in 1998, and helped the Canucks to their second Sutherland Cup championship in three years. He was then drafted 160th overall in the 1999 Ontario Hockey League Priority Draft by the Toronto St. Michael's Majors. Glaves would only play six games with the Majors before returning to the Canucks.

== Statistics ==
=== Canadian Lacrosse Association ===
			Regular Season					Playoffs
Season	Team	League	GP	G	A	Pts	PIM	GP	G	A	Pts	PIM
1999	St. Catharines Athletics	OLA Jr.A	19	2	5	7	7	8	1	0	1	2
2000	St. Catharines Athletics	OLA Jr.A	19	3	5	8	2	15	0	7	7	8
2001	St. Catharines Athletics	OLA Jr.A	14	2	5	7	12	13	2	1	3	0
Minto Cup	St. Catharines Athletics	CLA	--	--	--	--	--	6	0	0	0	2
2002	St. Catharines Athletics	OLA Jr.A	18	1	3	4	4	12	2	2	4	11
Minto Cup	St. Catharines Athletics	CLA	--	--	--	--	--	6	0	1	1	13
2003	St. Catharines Athletics	OLA Jr.A	13	0	5	5	2	12	0	3	3	2
Minto Cup	St. Catharines Athletics	CLA	--	--	--	--	--	6	0	2	2	--
2004	Victoria Shamrocks	WLA	20	0	10	10	2	8	1	6	7	0
Mann Cup	Victoria Shamrocks	CLA	--	--	--	--	--	4	0	0	0	0
2005	Victoria Shamrocks	WLA	13	1	5	6	0	8	1	2	3	0
Mann Cup	Victoria Shamrocks	CLA	--	--	--	--	--	6	0	0	0	2
Junior A Totals			83	8	23	31	27	60	5	13	18	23
Minto Cup Totals			--	--	--	--	--	18	0	3	3	15
Senior A Totals			33	1	15	16	2	16	2	8	10	0
Mann Cup Totals			--	--	--	--	--	10	0	0	0	2
