= St. Catharines Athletics Jr. A =

Canadian box lacrosse team

St. Catharines Athletics
- Sport: Box lacrosse
- Founded: 1877 (Organization)
- League: OLA Junior A Lacrosse League
- Based in: St. Catharines, Ontario
- Arena: Canada Games Park
- Colours: Navy Blue, Royal Blue and White
- Head coach: Steve Toll; Assist. Coaches: Rob Taylor; Brad Favaro
- General manager: Jeff Chcoski

The St. Catharines Athletics are a Junior "A" box lacrosse team from St. Catharines, Ontario, Canada. The Athletics play in the OLA Junior A Lacrosse League. Since 2022 the organization has also operated a Junior "B" franchise of the same name that plays in the OJBLL.

== History ==
The St. Catharines Athletics Jr.A squad has played in various arenas and under many different names in their history. They also had many years in which the team was defunct. However, the organization has been running successfully without danger of defunction since 1982. In 2021 the Athletics organization acquired the St. Catharines Spartans franchise of the OJBLL. They were renamed to the Athletics as well and now serve as a direct affiliate to the Junior "A" squad.

St. Catharines Athletics 1877-1953, 1958-1961, 1982 to Present
St. Catharines Teepees 1954
St. Catharines Norsemen 1955-1956
St. Catharines Supertests 1964 - 1966
St. Catharines Lakesides 1967 - 1971
St. Catharines Legionaires 1972 - 1977

== Minto Cup championships ==
During their history, the team has won six Minto Cup championships (1947, 1950, 1990, 1991, 2001, 2003.)

- 1947 defeated the Vancouver Jr. Burrards 3 games to 1 - played @ Haig Bowl in St. Catharines, Ontario.
- 1950 defeated the Vancouver Jr. Burradrs 3 games to 0 - played in Vancouver, British Columbia and the Winnipeg All-Stars 2 games to 0 - played in Winnipeg, Manitoba.
- 1990 defeated the Richmond Outlaws 2 games to 1 - played @ Queen's Park Arena in New Westminster, B.C.
- 1991 defeated the Victoria Eagles 4 games to 1 - played @ Garden City Arena in St. Catharines, Ontario
- 2001 defeated the Burnaby Jr. A Lakers 4 games to 2 - played @ Garden City Arena in St. Catharines, Ontario
- 2003 defeated the Burnaby Jr. A Lakers 2 games to 1 - played @ Waterloo Memorial Recreation Complex in Waterloo, Ontario

== NLL players ==
Many St. Catharines lacrosse players who played for the Athletics have gone on to successfully play in the National Lacrosse League, such as:

- Ian Llord - Buffalo Bandits
- Sean Greenhalgh - Buffalo Bandits
- Billy Dee Smith - Buffalo Bandits
- Mark Steenhuis - Buffalo Bandits
- Matt Skinner- Toronto Rock
- Steve Priolo - Buffalo Bandits
- Corey Quinn - Buffalo Bandits
- Geoff McNulty - Calgary Roughnecks
- Joel McCready - Rochester Knighthawks
- Ian Rubel - Rochester Knighthawks
- Steve Toll - Rochester Knighthawks (all time leader in assists (356) and points (608))
- Matt Vinc - Buffalo Bandits
- Pat McCready - Rochester Knighthawks
- Thomas Hajek - Philadelphia Wings
- Craig Conn - Washington Stealth
- Jon Sullivan - Minnesota Swarm
- Brad Favero - Minnesota Swarm
- Corey Small - Toronto Rock
- Randy Mearns - retired.
- Tyson Bell - Calgary Roughnecks
- Latrell Harris - Toronto Rock
- Jeff Wittig - Colorado Mammoth
- Holden Garlent - Saskatchewan Rush
- Alex Pace - Philadelphia Wings
- Thomas Whitty - Rochester Knighthawks
- Nick Damude - Panther City Lacrosse
- Ari Steenhuis - San Diego Seals

There is also a notable number of players outside of St. Catharines who have gone on to successful careers after playing for the Athletics. Players included are:

- Mike Accursi - Rochester Knighthawks (two seasons)
- Luke Wiles - Washington Stealth (one season)
- Athan Iannucci - Philadelphia Wings (one season)
- Mike Hominuck - Toronto Rock
- Rory Glaves - Edmonton Rush
- Frank Resetarits - Buffalo Bandits
- Joe Resetarits - Buffalo Bandits
- Brett Bucktooth - Buffalo Bandits (one season)
- Darris Kilgour - Buffalo Bandits (Retired from playing, now head coach of the Bandits)
- Cam Bomberry - retired
- Tyson Leies - retired.
- Brian Lemon - Baltimore Thunder, Detroit Turbos (Current National Lacrosse League Vice President of Operations)

Recently drafted players (2020) include:

- Laine Hruska - 13th Overall (Georgia)
- Owen Friesen - 48th Overall (Halifax)
- John Kit - 74th Overall (Philadelphia)
- Sam LeClair - 86th Overall (Colorado)

== Season-by-season results ==
Note: GP = Games played, W = Wins, L = Losses, T = Ties, Pts = Points, GF = Goals for, GA = Goals against

Season	GP	W	L	T	GF	GA	PTS	Placing	Playoffs
1961	22	11	11	0	200	255	22	4th OLA-A	Lost semi-final
1962	0	-	-	-	-	-	-	Folded	
1963	24	12	12	0	261	272	24	4th OLA-A	Lost semi-final
1964	24	14	10	0	322	274	28	3rd OLA-A	Lost semi-final
1965	20	9	11	0	270	257	18	5th OLA-A	Lost quarter-final
1966	24	11	13	0	326	315	22	4th OLA-A	Lost quarter-final
1967	24	6	18	0	240	350	12	8th OLA-A	Lost semi-final
1968	24	9	14	1	277	325	19	5th OLA-A	Lost quarter-final
1969	24	7	17	0	301	376	14	7th OLA-A	Lost quarter-final
1970	28	11	16	1	357	400	23	7th OLA-A	Lost semi-final
1971	30	5	25	0	341	463	10	7th OLA-A	Lost quarter-final
1972	28	11	17	0	346	442	22	6th OLA-A	Lost quarter-final
1973	28	9	19	0	369	457	18	6th OLA-A	Lost semi-final
1974	28	6	22	0	338	448	12	8th OLA-A	Lost semi-final
1975	28	11	17	0	331	389	22	7th OLA-A	DNQ
1976	26	9	16	1	310	392	19	4th OLA-A West	Lost quarter-final
1977	22	3	19	0	237	364	6	11th OLA-A	DNQ
1982	20	8	9	3	236	289	19	5th OLA-A	Lost quarter-final
1983	24	12	11	1	272	290	25	5th OLA-A	Lost Tier II Final
1984	24	13	10	1	327	288	27	3rd OLA-A	Lost semi-final
1985	24	17	7	0	405	284	34	3rd OLA-A	Lost semi-final
1986	20	12	8	0	258	210	24	2nd OLA-A	Lost final
1987	25	18	7	0	299	227	36	2nd OLA-A	Lost final
1988	24	17	6	1	388	235	35	2nd OLA-A	Lost semi-final
1989	24	19	5	0	346	195	38	2nd OLA-A	Lost final
1990	20	19	1	0	419	154	38	1st OLA-A	Won League, won Minto Cup
1991	20	15	5	0	261	163	30	1st OLA-A	Won League, won Minto Cup
1992	20	16	4	0	301	179	32	1st OLA-A	Lost final
1993	22	21	1	0	391	184	42	1st OLA-A	Lost final
1994	26	20	6	0	395	258	40	2nd OLA-A West	Lost semi-final
1995	20	15	5	0	279	190	30	3rd OLA-A	Lost final
1996	20	14	5	1	248	192	29	3rd OLA-A	Lost semi-final
1997	18	10	8	0	182	198	20	5th OLA-A	Lost quarter-final
1998	22	15	6	1	288	177	31	5th OLA-A	Lost final
1999	20	13	7	0	186	150	26	4th OLA-A	Lost semi-final
2000	20	11	9	0	178	174	22	5th OLA-A	Lost final
2001	20	14	5	1	200	144	29	2nd OLA-A	Won League, won Minto Cup
2002	20	20	0	0	223	118	40	1st OLA-A	Won League
2003	20	17	2	1	192	121	35	1st OLA-A	Won League, won Minto Cup
2004	20	12	8	0	193	158	24	5th OLA-A	Lost quarter-final
2005	22	6	16	0	188	198	12	9th OLA-A	DNQ
2006	22	14	6	2	186	159	30	3rd OLA-A	Lost quarter-final
2007	18	10	8	0	138	111	20	6th OLA-A	Lost quarter-final
2008	22	15	5	2	204	130	32	3rd OLA-A	Lost semi-final
2009	22	14	8	0	248	198	28	5th OLA-A	Lost quarter-final
2010	22	16	6	0	267	183	32	4th OLA-A	Lost quarter-final
2011	22	12	9	1	228	195	25	6th OLA-A	Lost quarter-final
2012	20	5	14	1	177	249	11	8th OLA-A	Lost quarter-final
2013	20	3	17	0	113	209	6	10th OLA-A	DNQ
2014	20	8	12	0	175	192	16	8th OLA-A	Lost quarter-final
2015	20	4	16	0	150	223	8	11th OLA-A	DNQ
2016	20	6	13	1	154	209	13	8th OLA-A	Lost quarter-final
2017	20	8	12	0	162	166	16	9th OLA-A	DNQ
2018	20	13	7	0	181	144	26	3rd OLA-A	Lost semi-final
2019	20	15	5	0	188	107	30	3rd OLA-A	Lost semi-final
2020	Season cancelled due to COVID-19 pandemic								
2021	8	6	2	0	66	43	12	1st of 6 West; 2nd of 11 OJLL	Won semi-final, 7-6 (Mountaineers); Won Iroquois Trophy, 14-13 (Excelsiors)
2022	20	10	10	0	185	200	20	6th OJLL	Lost quarter-final, 3-0 (Warriors)
2023	20	8	12	0	148	184	16	7th OJLL	Lost quarter-final, 3-0 (Blaze)
2024	20	10	10	0	165	153	20	5th OJLL	Won quarter-final, 3-1 (Blaze) Lost semi-final, 3-0 (Northmen)
2025	20	12	8	0	172	160	22	6th OJLL	Lost quarter-final, 3-2 (Warriors)
2026	18	15	3	0	193	161	30	1st of 6 in West 1st of 12 in OJLL	Won quarter-final, 4-1 (Blaze) Won semi-final, 4-1 (Northmen) Won Iroquois Trophy, 4-2 (Warriors)
