= Peterborough Lakers =

Peterborough Lakers may refer to:

- Peterborough Lakers (MSL), a Senior A box lacrosse team from Peterborough, Ontario, Canada
- Peterborough Lakers Jr. A, a Junior A box lacrosse team from Peterborough, Ontario, Canada
