= Craig Point =

Haudenosaunee lacrosse player (born 1986)

Personal information
- Nationality: Haudenosaunee
- Born: January 19, 1986 (age 40) Ohsweken, Ontario, Canada
- Height: 5 ft 11 in (180 cm)
- Weight: 215 lb (98 kg; 15 st 5 lb)

Sport
- Position: Forward (box lacrosse), Midfield (field lacrosse)
- Shoots: Right
- NLL draft: 3rd overall, 2007; Boston Blazers
- NLL teams: Buffalo Bandits; Rochester Knighthawks; Minnesota Swarm
- MLL teams: Toronto/Hamilton Nationals
- MSL team: Six Nations Chiefs
- Pro career: 2008–2017

Craig Point (born January 19, 1986) is a Haudenosaunee lacrosse player who currently plays for the Rochester Knighthawks of the National Lacrosse League and the Six Nations Chiefs of Major Series Lacrosse. He was born in Ohsweken, Ontario, and comes from the Six Nations of the Grand River First Nation.

== Amateur career ==
Point led the Six Nations Arrows of the OLA Junior A Lacrosse League to four straight league championships and a Minto Cup national championship in 2007. He also played on the Iroquois Nationals team in the 2015 FIL World Indoor Lacrosse Championship, leading the team in scoring and earning a silver medal.

In 2006, Point led Onondaga Community College to an undefeated season and a NJCAA National Championship.

== National Lacrosse League career ==
The Boston Blazers drafted Point in the first round (third overall) in the 2007 NLL Entry Draft. Point was traded to the Minnesota Swarm prior to the 2008 NLL season. Making an immediate impact on the league, Point was named Rookie of the Week four times and Rookie of the Month in February. After the season, was awarded the Rookie of the Year award and was named the All-Rookie team.

In February 2009, Point was traded along with Dean Hill to the Rochester Knighthawks for Aaron Wilson.

Point was a member of the 2012 and 2013 Champion's Cup winning Rochester Knighthawks.

== Canadian Senior "A" career ==
Point was a member of the 2013 Mann Cup champion Six Nations Chiefs.

== Major League Lacrosse career ==
Point was a member of the Nationals for three seasons: the first two when the team played in Toronto, and the third after the team moved to Hamilton. Although he was a member of the 2009 Steinfeld Cup winning Toronto Nationals, he played only three regular-season games with the team and did not appear in any playoff games.

== Statistics ==
=== Major League Lacrosse ===
Season	Team	Regular season											Playoffs										
Season	Team	GP	G	2PG	A	Pts	Sh	GB	Pen	PIM	FOW	FOA	GP	G	2PG	A	Pts	Sh	GB	Pen	PIM	FOW	FOA
2009	Toronto Nationals	3	0	0	0	0	6	0	0	0	0	0	–	–	–	–	–	–	–	–	–	–	–
2010	Toronto Nationals	5	3	0	2	5	20	2	1	1	0	0	–	–	–	–	–	–	–	–	–	–	–
2011	Hamilton Nationals	2	0	0	0	0	1	0	0	0	0	0	–	–	–	–	–	–	–	–	–	–	–
		10	3	0	2	5	27	2	1	1	0	0	0	0	0	0	0	0	0	0	0	0	0
Career total:		10	3	0	2	5	27	2	1	1	0	0											

GP–Games played; G–Goals; 2PG–2-point goals; A–Assists; Pts–Points; Sh–Shots; GB–Ground balls; Pen–Penalties; PIM–Penalty minutes; FOW–Faceoffs won; FOA–Faceoffs attempted

=== National Lacrosse League ===
Craig Point		Regular season									Playoffs								
Season	Team	GP	G	A	Pts	LB	PIM	Pts/GP	LB/GP	PIM/GP	GP	G	A	Pts	LB	PIM	Pts/GP	LB/GP	PIM/GP
2008	Minnesota Swarm	16	27	34	61	74	8	3.81	4.63	0.50	1	1	1	2	4	0	2.00	4.00	0.00
2009	Minnesota Swarm	4	2	6	8	13	8	2.00	3.25	2.00	–	–	–	–	–	–	–	–	–
2009	Rochester Knighthawks	10	17	11	28	47	10	2.80	4.70	1.00	1	2	3	5	5	0	5.00	5.00	0.00
2010	Rochester Knighthawks	16	31	15	46	95	38	2.88	5.94	2.38	–	–	–	–	–	–	–	–	–
2011	Rochester Knighthawks	15	20	27	47	67	0	3.13	4.47	0.00	1	0	0	0	0	0	0.00	0.00	0.00
2012	Rochester Knighthawks	7	10	14	24	22	2	3.43	3.14	0.29	3	4	6	10	7	0	3.33	2.33	0.00
2013	Rochester Knighthawks	10	9	11	20	18	7	2.00	1.80	0.70	3	6	2	8	5	0	2.67	1.67	0.00
2014	Rochester Knighthawks	7	18	13	31	18	19	4.43	2.57	2.71	4	5	4	9	6	0	2.25	1.50	0.00
2015	Rochester Knighthawks	15	22	24	46	35	2	3.07	2.33	0.13	3	4	2	6	4	4	2.00	1.33	1.33
2016	Rochester Knighthawks	4	6	12	18	12	0	4.50	3.00	0.00	–	–	–	–	–	–	–	–	–
2017	Buffalo Bandits	1	0	0	0	2	0	0.00	2.00	0.00	–	–	–	–	–	–	–	–	–
		105	162	167	329	403	94	3.13	3.84	0.90	16	22	18	40	31	4	2.50	1.94	0.25
Career Total:		121	184	185	369	434	98	3.05	3.59	0.81									

GP–Games played; G–Goals; A–Assists; Pts–Points; LB–Loose balls; PIM–Penalty minutes; Pts/GP–Points per games played; LB/GP–Loose balls per games played; PIM/GP–Penalty minutes per games played.

=== Canadian Lacrosse Association ===
Craig Point - Junior "B"			Regular Season							Playoffs						
Season	Team	League	GP	G	A	Pts	PIM	Pts/GP	PIM/GP	GP	G	A	Pts	PIM	Pts/GP	PIM/GP
2002	Six Nations Rebels	OLA JR B	5	6	7	13	4	2.60	0.80	–	–	–	–	–	–	–
2003	Six Nations Rebels	OLA JR B	17	14	19	33	19	1.94	1.12	14	5	11	16	8	1.14	0.57
			22	20	26	46	23	2.09	1.05	14	5	11	16	8	1.14	0.57
Junior "B" Career Total:			36	25	37	62	31	1.72	0.86							

Craig Point - Junior "A"			Regular Season							Playoffs						
Season	Team	League	GP	G	A	Pts	PIM	Pts/GP	PIM/GP	GP	G	A	Pts	PIM	Pts/GP	PIM/GP
2002	Six Nations Arrows	OLA JR A	3	1	0	1	4	0.33	1.33	–	–	–	–	–	–	–
2003	Six Nations Arrows	OLA JR A	1	0	0	0	0	0.00	0.00	–	–	–	–	–	–	–
2004	Six Nations Arrows	OLA JR A	20	26	30	56	20	2.80	1.00	7	8	10	18	4	2.57	0.57
2005	Six Nations Arrows	OLA JR A	22	38	21	59	20	2.68	0.91	18	15	20	35	16	1.94	0.89
2006	Six Nations Arrows	OLA JR A	21	41	24	65	24	3.10	1.14	14	20	14	34	15	2.43	1.07
2007	Six Nations Arrows	OLA JR A	18	34	30	64	27	3.56	1.50	15	28	24	52	6	3.47	0.40
			85	140	105	245	95	2.88	1.12	54	71	68	139	41	2.57	0.76
Junior "A" Career Total:			139	211	173	384	136	2.76	0.98							

Craig Point - Senior "A"			Regular Season							Playoffs						
Season	Team	League	GP	G	A	Pts	PIM	Pts/GP	PIM/GP	GP	G	A	Pts	PIM	Pts/GP	PIM/GP
2008	Six Nations Chiefs	MSL	17	18	22	40	2	2.35	0.12	4	3	6	9	2	2.25	0.50
2009	Six Nations Chiefs	MSL	14	21	34	55	10	3.93	0.71	5	5	5	10	6	2.00	1.20
2010	Six Nations Chiefs	MSL	15	26	44	70	19	4.67	1.27	11	18	20	38	18	3.45	1.64
2011	Six Nations Chiefs	MSL	10	8	19	27	11	2.70	1.10	11	22	15	37	4	3.36	0.36
2012	Six Nations Chiefs	MSL	14	19	15	34	8	2.43	0.57	10	13	9	22	8	2.20	0.80
2013	Six Nations Chiefs	MSL	18	24	47	71	23	3.94	1.28	14	13	25	38	12	2.71	0.86
			88	116	181	297	73	3.38	0.83	55	74	80	154	50	2.80	0.91
Senior "A" Career Total:			143	190	261	451	123	3.15	0.86							

GP–Games played; G–Goals; A–Assists; Pts–Points; PIM–Penalty minutes; Pts/GP–Points per game; PIM/GP–Penalty minutes per game

== Awards ==
Preceded by Ryan Benesch	NLL Rookie of the Year; 2008	Succeeded by Rhys Duch
