= Brampton Excelsiors Jr. A =

Canadian box lacrosse team

Brampton Excelsiors
- Sport: Box lacrosse
- Founded: 1883
- League: OLA Junior A Lacrosse League
- Based in: Brampton, Ontario
- Arena: Memorial Arena
- Colours: Maroon, Yellow, and White
- Head coach: Patty O’Toole
- General manager: Chris Lowe
- National championships: (4) 1952, 1957, 1958, 1959 - Minto Cup
- History: Brampton Excelsiors 19xx - 1961; Brampton ABC's 1962 - 1967; Bramalea Excelsiors 1968 - 1976; Brampton Excelsiors 1977 to Present

The Brampton Excelsiors are Junior "A" box lacrosse team from Brampton, Ontario, Canada. The Excelsiors play in the OLA Junior A Lacrosse League.

== History ==
- 2012 Season: The Ontario Lacrosse League implements a goals for/goals against ruling. When two teams are tied with the same number of points at the end of the season, and when those two teams have split the outcomes of their own two-game series equally (e.g. 7-4, 4-7 respectively). Burlington outscored Brampton by 1 goal, between their two games, giving Burlington the 6th place seed in the tie-break.
- 2017 Season: For the second time in recorded team history the top three point scorers in the OLA were Brampton Excelsiors. Jeff Teat, Tyson Gibson and Clarke Petterson respectively finished the 2017 regular season in the top three points league-wide.
- 2018 Season: Doug Arthur creates controversy - suspended after berating referees in their dressing room (assessed a gross misconduct) Team members threaten officials at Minto Cup and lose best of 5 series to Coquitlam 3-1.

== Season-by-season results ==
Note: GP = Games played, W = Wins, L = Losses, T = Ties, Pts = Points, GF = Goals for, GA = Goals against

Season	GP	W	L	T	GF	GA	PTS	Placing	Playoffs
1961	24	20	4	0	342	201	40	1st OLA-A	Lost final
1962	20	17	3	0	315	159	34	2nd OLA-A	Won League
1963	24	20	4	0	287	174	40	1st OLA-A	Lost final
1964	24	16	8	0	311	288	32	2nd OLA-A	Lost final
1965	20	8	12	0	226	250	16	7th OLA-A	Lost quarter-final
1966	24	9	15	0	271	311	18	5th OLA-A	Lost quarter-final
1967	24	12	12	0	270	284	24	5th OLA-A	Lost quarter-final
1968	24	18	6	0	346	268	36	2nd OLA-A	Lost semi-final
1969	24	10	14	0	393	367	20	6th OLA-A	Lost quarter-final
1970	28	20	8	0	393	316	40	2nd OLA-A	Lost final
1971	30	16	14	0	359	349	32	3rd OLA-A	Lost semi-final
1972	28	16	10	2	380	305	34	2nd OLA-A	Lost quarter-final
1973	28	18	10	0	426	399	36	3rd OLA-A	Lost final
1974	28	14	12	2	391	408	30	3rd OLA-A	Lost Round Robin
1975	28	17	11	0	422	389	34	3rd OLA-A	Lost semi-final
1976	26	17	8	1	356	312	35	1st OLA-A West	Won League
1977	22	14	8	0	317	258	28	6th OLA-A	Lost quarter-final
1978	30	2	28	0	300	547	4	6th OLA-A East	Did not qualify
1979	28	7	21	0	364	447	14	5th OLA-A East	Lost quarter-final
1980	20	3	17	0	270	373	6	8th OLA-A	Lost quarter-final
1981	20	11	9	0	272	265	22	4th OLA-A	Lost semi-final
1982	20	6	14	0	266	331	12	7th OLA-A	Lost quarter-final
1983	24	8	16	0	289	340	16	7th OLA-A	Lost Tier II Semi-final
1984	24	8	16	0	269	342	16	5th OLA-A	Lost semi-final
1985	24	16	8	0	332	273	32	4th OLA-A	Lost semi-final
1986	20	4	16	0	196	277	8	5th OLA-A	Did not qualify
1987	25	11	14	0	300	311	22	4th OLA-A	Lost semi-final
1988	24	9	15	0	266	289	18	5th OLA-A	Did not qualify
1989	24	9	15	0	229	297	18	4th OLA-A	Lost semi-final
1990	20	10	10	0	211	240	20	4th OLA-A	Lost quarter-final
1991	20	9	10	1	232	219	19	7th OLA-A	Lost semi-final
1992	20	14	5	1	246	201	29	2nd OLA-A	Lost semi-final
1993	22	14	8	0	281	221	28	4th OLA-A	Lost quarter-final
1994	25	16	9	0	329	254	32	3rd OLA-A East	Won League
1995	20	9	11	0	231	234	18	6th OLA-A	Lost quarter-final
1996	20	3	17	0	183	285	6	11th OLA-A	Did not qualify
1997	18	2	15	1	172	293	5	10th OLA-A	Did not qualify
1998	22	3	19	0	163	343	6	11th OLA-A	Did not qualify
1999	20	3	17	0	171	250	6	11th OLA-A	Did not qualify
2000	20	4	16	0	154	195	8	11th OLA-A	Did not qualify
2001	20	4	16	0	136	218	8	10th OLA-A	Did not qualify
2002	20	6	13	1	160	205	13	8th OLA-A	Lost quarter-final
2003	20	8	10	2	202	194	18	7th OLA-A	Lost quarter-final
2004	20	9	11	0	165	179	18	8th OLA-A	Lost quarter-final
2005	22	13	9	0	201	176	26	6th OLA-A	Lost semi-final
2006	22	10	12	0	182	169	20	9th OLA-A	Did not qualify
2007	18	13	5	0	155	105	26	3rd OLA-A	Lost semi-final
2008	22	10	11	1	130	127	21	8th OLA-A	Lost quarter-final
2009	22	18	3	1	226	145	37	2nd OLA-A	Lost final
2010	22	12	10	0	197	172	24	6th OLA-A	Lost quarter-final
2011	22	14	8	0	250	208	28	4th OLA-A	Lost quarter-final
*2012	20	10	9	1	229	213	21	7th OLA-A	Lost quarter-final
2013	20	13	7	0	216	195	26	4th OLA-A	Lost semi-final
2014	20	15	5	0	248	179	30	2nd OLA-A	Lost semi-final
2015	20	13	7	0	201	174	26	3rd OLA-A	Lost semi-final
2016	20	12	6	2	213	176	26	3rd OLA-A	Lost semi-final
2017	20	14	6	0	249	185	28	2nd OLA-A	Lost semi-final
2018	20	14	6	0	194	151	28	2nd OLA-A	Won League
2019	20	13	7	0	182	148	26	4th OLA-A	Lost semi-final
2020	Season cancelled due to COVID-19 pandemic								
2021	8	6	2	0	57	41	12	2nd of 6 West; 3rd of 11 OJLL	Won semi-final, 8-7 (Warriors); Lost final, 13-14 (Athletics)
2022	20	3	17	0	134	224	6	10th OJLL	Did not qualify
2023	20	7	13	0	150	182	14	9th OJLL	Did not qualify
2024	20	10	10	0	176	183	20	6th OJLL	Lost quarter-final, 3-0 (Mountaineers)
2025	20	3	17	0	177	237	6	11th OJLL	Did not qualify
