= Ottawa Titans (lacrosse) =

- Sport: Box lacrosse
- Founded: 2005
- League: OLA Junior A Lacrosse League
- Based in: Ottawa, Ontario
- Arena: Earl Armstrong Arena
- Colours: Turquoise, Blue, and White
- Head coach: Andre Leduc
- General manager: Don Moore

The Ottawa Titans were a Junior "A" box lacrosse team from Ottawa, Ontario, Canada. The Titans played in the OLA Junior A Lacrosse League from 2005 to 2007. The Titans suspended their operations for the 2008 and 2009 seasons, and are not likely to return.

== History ==
The Ottawa Titans joined the Ontario Lacrosse Associations Jr. A circuit as an expansion team in 2005.

== Season-by-season results ==
Note: GP = Games played, W = Wins, L = Losses, T = Ties, Pts = Points, GF = Goals for, GA = Goals against

Season	GP	W	L	T	GF	GA	PTS	Placing	Playoffs
2005	22	9	13	0	184	180	18	8th OLA-A	Lost quarter-final
2006	22	11	10	1	178	201	23	7th OLA-A	Lost quarter-final
2007	18	2	16	0	112	200	4	13th OLA-A	DNQ

The Titans have suspended operations for the 2008 and 2009 seasons and did not return.
