= Toronto Beaches (lacrosse) =

Canadian box lacrosse team

Toronto Beaches Junior A Lacrosse Club
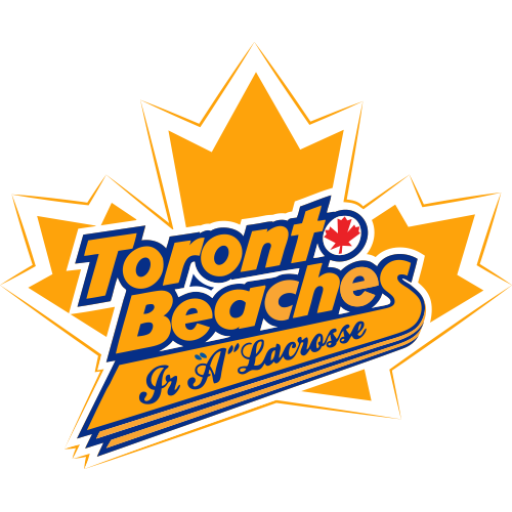
- Sport: Box lacrosse
- Founded: 1991
- League: Formally in the Junior A Lacrosse League
- Based in: Toronto, Ontario
- Arena: Ted Reeve Community Arena
- Colours: Blue, Yellow, and White
- Anthem: First Day Out - Tee Grizzley
- Head coach: Reilly O' Connor

The Toronto Beaches are a Junior "A" box lacrosse team from Toronto, Ontario, Canada. The Beaches play in the OLA Junior A Lacrosse League (OJLL). They are named after The Beaches, an east-end Toronto neighbourhood.

== Season-by-season results ==
Note: GP = Games played, W = Wins, L = Losses, T = Ties, Pts = Points, GF = Goals for, GA = Goals against

Season	GP	W	L	T	GF	GA	PTS	Placing	Playoffs
1979	22	15	7	0	352	243	30	2nd OLA-B East	
1980	16	11	5	0	230	182	22	3rd OLA-B East	Lost final
1981	18	15	3	0	280	153	30	2nd OLA-B East	Lost final
1982	20	18	2	0	285	158	36	1st OLA-B East	Lost final
1983	22	15	6	1	314	226	31	1st OLA-B East	Lost final
1991	20	8	12	0	203	218	16	10th OLA-A	DNQ
1992	20	10	10	0	219	210	20	6th OLA-A	Lost quarter-final
1993	22	12	10	0	249	191	24	5th OLA-A	Lost semi-final
1994	24	14	10	0	292	271	28	4th OLA-A East	Lost quarter-final
1995	20	12	8	0	226	179	24	4th OLA-A	Lost quarter-final
1996	20	9	10	1	211	214	19	5th OLA-A	Lost quarter-final
1997	0	-	-	-	-	-	-	Folded	
1998	22	5	17	0	174	262	10	10th OLA-A	DNQ
1999	20	3	17	0	139	257	6	10th OLA-A	DNQ
2000	20	6	14	0	184	213	12	9th OLA-A	DNQ
2001	20	9	11	0	168	178	18	7th OLA-A	Lost quarter-final
2002	20	14	6	0	171	159	28	2nd OLA-A	Lost final
2003	20	12	8	0	181	150	24	3rd OLA-A	Lost semi-final
2004	20	14	6	0	197	176	28	3rd OLA-A	Lost semi-final
2005	22	11	11	0	193	185	22	7th OLA-A	Lost quarter-final
2006	22	12	10	0	220	206	24	4th OLA-A	Lost quarter-final
2007	18	3	14	1	146	188	7	12th OLA-A	DNQ
2008	22	4	18	0	124	199	8	11th OLA-A	DNQ
2009	22	4	18	0	154	297	8	11th OLA-A	DNQ
2010	22	3	18	1	167	266	7	11th OLA-A	DNQ
2011	22	3	19	0	158	275	6	11th OLA-A	DNQ
2012	20	4	15	1	147	234	9	9th OLA-A	DNQ
2013	20	6	14	0	164	215	12	9th OLA-A	DNQ
2014	20	6	14	0	160	223	12	10th OLA-A	DNQ
2015	20	9	10	0	187	179	19	6th OLA-A	Lost quarter-final
2016	20	5	15	0	155	208	10	10th OLA-A	DNQ
2017	20	8	11	1	181	210	17	8th OLA-A	Lost quarter-final
2018	20	9	11	0	175	177	18	8th OLA-A	Lost semi-final
2019	20	9	11	0	179	172	18	9th OLA-A	DNQ
2020	Season cancelled due to COVID-19 pandemic								
2021	8	4	4	0	54	51	8	3rd of 5 East; 6th of 11 OJLL	Did not qualify
2022	20	15	5	0	237	169	30	2nd OJLL	Lost final, Lost Minto Cup
2023	20	12	8	0	220	167	24	5th OJLL	Lost semi-final
