= Orangeville Northmen Jr. A =

Canadian box lacrosse team

Orangeville Northmen
- Sport: Box lacrosse
- Founded: 1975; 51 years ago
- League: OLA Junior A Lacrosse League
- Based in: Orangeville, Ontario
- Arena: Tony Rose Memorial Sports Centre
- Colours: Silver, Black, and White
- President: Nick Rose (President and GM)
- Head coach: Rusty Kruger

The Orangeville Northmen are a Junior "A" box lacrosse team from Orangeville, Ontario, Canada. The Northmen play in the OLA Junior A Lacrosse League.

== History ==
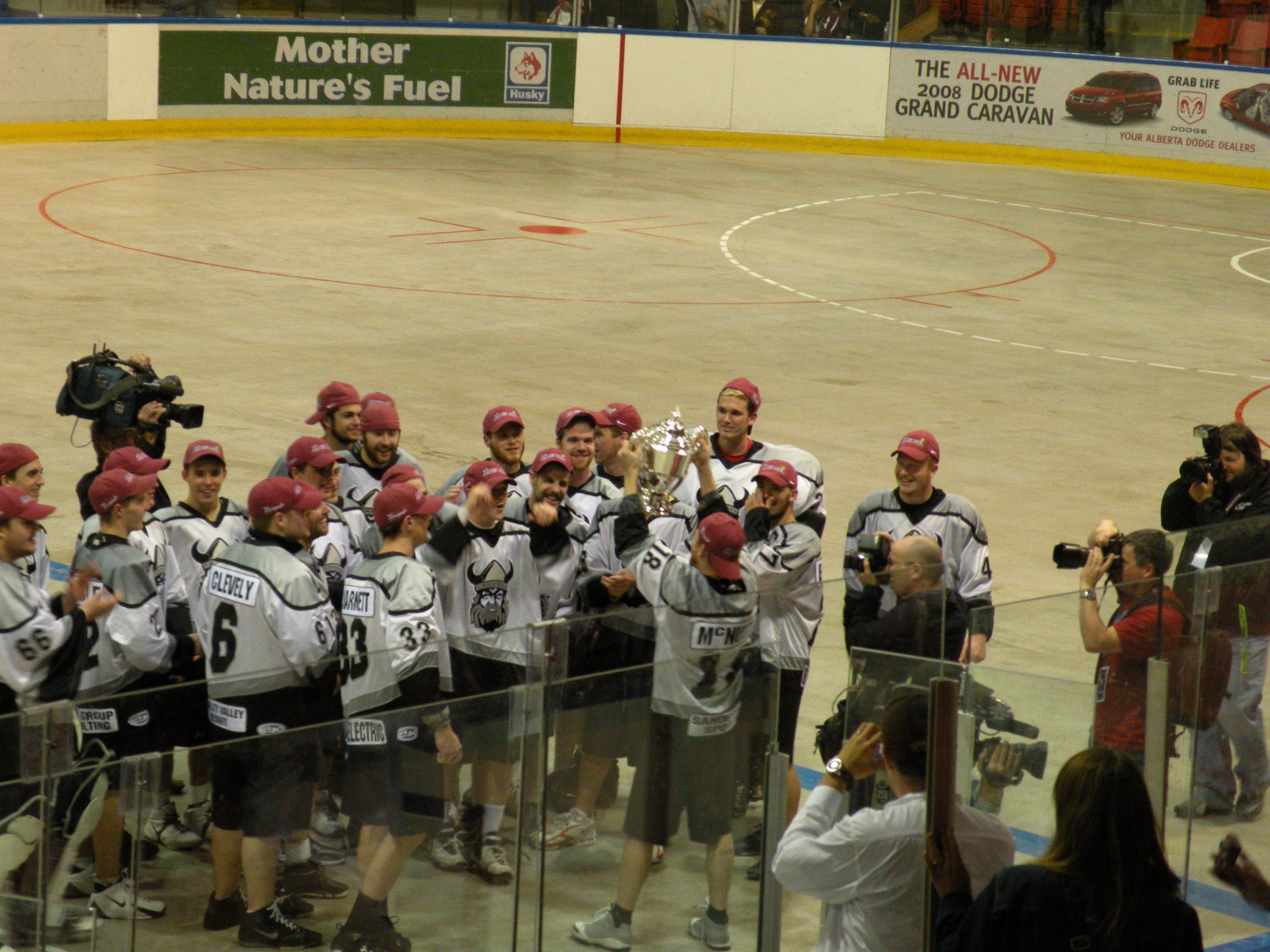
The Northmen celebrate their 2008 Minto Cup championship in Calgary.

Orangeville Stingers 1975 - 1981
Orangeville Northmen 1982 to Present

The Northmen are connected to the Orangeville Northmen Jr. B, who were founded to be a feeder team for the Junior "A" Northmen.

== Season-by-season results ==
Note: GP = Games played, W = Wins, L = Losses, T = Ties, Pts = Points, GF = Goals for, GA = Goals against

Season	GP	W	L	T	GF	GA	PTS	Placing	Playoffs
1975	24	13	11	0	341	359	26	3rd OLA-C Central	Lost Division Quarter-final
1976	22	11	11	0	257	276	22	6th OLA-C	Won League
1977	24	15	8	1	301	230	31	3rd OLA-C	Lost final
1978	20	8	12	0	214	237	16	4th OLA-C	Lost quarter-final
1979	24	5	19	0	232	442	10	4th OLA-C	
1980	16	2	14	0	146	269	4	6th OLA-B Central	DNQ
1981	20	0	20	0	89	394	0	8th OLA-B West	DNQ
1982	20	4	16	0	180	283	8	9th OLA-B East	DNQ
1983	22	9	13	0	308	324	18	10th OLA-B East	DNQ
1984	20	8	12	0	313	317	16	3rd OLA-B Div II	Won Tier II Title
1985	24	9	15	0	281	354	18	5th OLA-B East	DNQ
1986	18	8	9	1	192	257	17	5th OLA-B East	Lost quarter-final
1987	0	-	-	-	-	-	-	Folded	
1988	0	-	-	-	-	-	-	Folded	
1989	20	15	5	0	276	160	30	2nd OLA-B	Won League, won Founders Cup
1990	20	17	3	0	268	158	34	2nd OLA-B	Won League, won Founders Cup
1991	20	14	6	0	234	198	28	2nd OLA-A	Lost quarter-final
1992	20	9	11	0	213	219	18	7th OLA-A	Lost quarter-final
1993	22	18	4	0	329	213	36	2nd OLA-A	Won League, won Minto Cup
1994	26	21	5	0	367	194	42	1st OLA-A West	Lost semi-final
1995	20	19	1	0	231	125	38	1st OLA-A	Won League, won Minto Cup
1996	20	18	2	0	283	118	36	2nd OLA-A	Won League, won Minto Cup
1997	18	14	4	0	184	158	28	2nd OLA-A	Lost semi-final
1998	22	12	10	0	264	205	24	6th OLA-A	Lost semi-final
1999	20	16	3	1	211	165	33	2nd OLA-A	Lost semi-final
2000	20	16	4	0	220	141	32	2nd OLA-A	Won League
2001	20	14	5	1	203	158	29	3rd OLA-A	Lost quarter-final
2002	20	14	6	0	185	158	28	4th OLA-A	Lost semi-final
2003	20	16	3	1	194	137	33	2nd OLA-A	Lost final
2004	20	15	4	1	196	140	31	1st OLA-A	Lost semi-final
2005	22	19	3	0	220	123	38	2nd OLA-A	Lost final
2006	22	11	10	1	176	155	23	6th OLA-A	Lost semi-final
2007	18	14	3	1	170	106	29	2nd OLA-A	Lost final
2008	22	19	3	0	207	114	38	1st OLA-A	Won League, won Minto Cup
2009	22	19	2	1	303	138	39	1st OLA-A	Won League, won Minto Cup
2010	22	21	1	0	268	116	42	1st OLA-A	Won League
2011	22	19	3	0	242	147	38	1st OLA-A	Lost final
2012	20	16	4	0	256	148	32	3rd OLA-A	Won League, won Minto Cup
2013	20	12	8	0	212	197	24	5th OLA-A	Lost quarter-final
2014	20	12	8	0	196	154	24	6th OLA-A	Lost quarter-final
2015	20	9	9	2	171	149	20	5th OLA-A	Lost Quarter-Final
2016	20	14	5	1	197	165	27	2nd OLA-A	Won League
2017	20	10	9	1	145	158	21	6th OLA-A	Lost Quarter-Final
2018	20	12	8	0	169	142	24	4th OLA-A	Lost Final
2019	20	16	3	1	191	128	33	1st OLA-A	Won League, Won Minto Cup
2020	Season cancelled due to COVID-19 pandemic								
2021	8	3	5	0	46	65	6	4th of 5 East; 9th of 11 OJLL	Did not qualify
2022	20	13	7	0	200	156	26	5th OLA-A	Lost Semi-Final
2023	20	20	0	0	270	117	40	1st OLA-A	Lost Final
2024	20	17	3	0	230	153	34	1st OLA-A	Won League
2025	20	16	4	0	183	149	32	1st OLA-A	Won League
2026	18	9	9	0	160	150	18	3rd of 6 East; 7th of 12 OJLL	Lost Semi-Final

== Orangeville natives and Northmen alumni in the NLL ==
Orangeville and the Northmen have produced a number of National Lacrosse League players, coaches, and executives.

- Dillon Ward (Colorado Mammoth)
- Adam Jones (Colorado Mammoth)
- Greg Harnett (Calgary Roughnecks)
- Jon Harnett (Boston Blazers, Calgary Roughnecks)
- Mike Poulin (Toronto Rock, Boston Blazers, Calgary Roughnecks)
- Bill Hostrawser (Washington Stealth, Toronto Rock)
- Rob Hellyer (Toronto Rock)
- Damon Edwards (Toronto Rock)
- Jesse Gamble (Toronto Rock)
- Hayden Smith (Buffalo Bandits)
- Andrew Suitor (Minnesota Swarm, New England)
- Glen Bryan (Toronto Rock, Buffalo Bandits)
- Craig England (Buffalo Bandits, Toronto Rock, New England)
- Nick Rose (Boston Blazers, Calgary Roughnecks, Toronto Rock)
- Bruce Codd (Albany Attack, Columbus Landsharks, Montreal Express, Ottawa Rebel, Arizona Sting, Calgary Roughnecks, Toronto Rock)
- Pat Coyle (Detroit Turbos, Ontario Raiders, Toronto Rock, Colorado Mammoth)
- Chad Culp (Buffalo Bandits)
- Darren Halls (Minnesota Swarm)
- Jon Harasym (Columbus Landsharks, Rochester Knighthawks, Minnesota Swarm, Buffalo Bandits, Toronto Rock)
- Bryan Kazarian (Albany Attack, Buffalo Bandits, Chicago Shamrox)
- Mike Kirk (Boston Blazers, Rochester Knighthawks)
- Rusty Kruger (Rochester Knighthawks, New York Saints, Albany Attack, San Jose Sharks, Toronto Rock, Chicago Shamrox, Buffalo Bandits)
- Matt Lyons (Rochester Knighthawks, Boston Blazers)
- Brad MacDonald (Calgary Roughnecks, Toronto Rock, Arizona Sting, Portland Lumberjax)
- Mat MacLeod (Rochester Knighthawks, Orlando Titans, Toronto Rock)
- Mike MacLeod (Toronto Rock)
- Rob Marshall (Toronto Rock)
- Brodie Merrill (Edmonton Rush)
- Patrick Merrill (Orlando Titans, Toronto Rock)
- Brandon Miller (Albany Attack, San Jose Stealth, Chicago Shamrox, Philadelphia Wings, Toronto Rock)
- Mackenzie Mitchell (Vancouver, New England)
- Mike Murray (Toronto Rock)
- Pat O'Toole (New York Saints, Buffalo Bandits, Rochester Knighthawks)
- Jim Rankin (Syracuse Smash)
- Gary Scott (Albany Attack, Toronto Rock)
- Brandon Sanderson (Montreal Express, Ottawa Rebel)
- Chris Sanderson (Baltimore Thunder, Philadelphia Wings, New Jersey Storm)
- Josh Sanderson (Albany Attack, Toronto Rock, Calgary Roughnecks, Boston Blazers)
- Lindsay Sanderson
- Nathan Sanderson (Toronto Rock)
- Phil Sanderson (Buffalo Bandits, Toronto Rock)
- Ryan Sanderson (Buffalo Bandits, Baltimore Thunder, Albany Attack)
- Shane Sanderson
- Terry Sanderson
- Brandon Slade (Toronto Rock)
- Ty Thompson (Las Vegas Desert Dogs)
- Peter Veltman (Arizona Sting, San Jose Stealth)
