= Burlington Blaze =

Canadian junior "A" box lacrosse team from Burlington, Ontario, Canada

- Former team logo
- Sport: Box lacrosse
- Founded: 1976
- League: OLA Junior A Lacrosse League
- Team history: Burlington Blaze (2023-present); Burlington Chiefs (1992-2023); Bay Area Bengals (1984-1991); Hamilton Bengals (1976-1983)
- Location: Burlington, Ontario
- Arena: Central Arena
- Colours: Red, Black, and White
- Head coach: Dan Macrae
- General manager: Sean Gillies
- National championships: 2023 - Minto Cup
- League titles: 2023 - OJLL

Burlington Blaze Jr A team logo

The Burlington Blaze are a Junior "A" box lacrosse team from Burlington, Ontario, Canada. The Blaze play in the OLA Junior A Lacrosse League. From 1992 until 2023 the franchise was known as the Burlington Chiefs. In August 2023, the Burlington Blaze Jr A team won the Canada Minto Cup.

== Season-by-season results ==
Note: GP = Games played, W = Wins, L = Losses, T = Ties, Pts = Points, GF = Goals for, GA = Goals against

Season	GP	W	L	T	GF	GA	PTS	Placing	Playoffs
1976	26	10	16	0	375	400	20	3rd OLA-A West	Lost quarter-final
1977	22	9	12	1	282	298	19	8th OLA-A	Lost quarter-final
1978	24	12	12	0	298	299	24	3rd OLA-A West	Lost semi-final
1979	24	14	9	1	338	303	29	1st OLA-A West	Lost semi-final
1980	20	11	9	0	312	287	22	5th OLA-A	Lost semi-final
1981	20	9	11	0	281	259	18	6th OLA-A	Lost quarter-final
1982	20	3	16	1	188	336	7	8th OLA-A	Lost quarter-final
1983	24	11	12	1	295	286	23	6th OLA-A	Won Tier II Title
1984	24	6	18	0	245	398	12	6th OLA-A	Lost quarter-final, lost Tier II Final
1985	24	6	18	0	263	365	12	6th OLA-A	Won Tier II Title
1986	20	3	16	1	203	340	7	6th OLA-A	Did not qualify
1987	25	5	20	0	182	356	10	5th OLA-A	Did not qualify
1988	24	10	14	0	289	292	20	4th OLA-A	Lost semi-final
1989	24	6	18	0	251	337	12	7th OLA-A	Did not qualify
1990	20	2	18	0	169	314	4	8th OLA-A	Did not qualify
1991	20	9	11	0	212	239	18	8th OLA-A	Lost quarter-final
1992	20	2	18	0	139	289	4	11th OLA-A	Did not qualify
1993	22	9	12	1	257	277	19	9th OLA-A	Did not qualify
1994	26	9	17	0	286	365	18	5th OLA-A West	Did not qualify
1995	20	3	17	0	151	280	6	11th OLA-A	Did not qualify
1996	20	9	10	1	170	212	19	7th OLA-A	Lost quarter-final
1997	18	8	9	1	181	212	17	6th OLA-A	Lost quarter-final
1998	22	15	6	1	243	193	31	4th OLA-A	Lost quarter-final
1999	20	6	14	0	202	248	12	8th OLA-A	Lost quarter-final
2000	20	8	12	0	205	225	16	7th OLA-A	Lost quarter-final
2001	20	8	12	0	190	214	16	8th OLA-A	Lost quarter-final
2002	20	4	16	0	157	208	8	10th OLA-A	Did not qualify
2003	20	3	17	0	146	235	6	11th OLA-A	Did not qualify
2004	20	6	14	0	159	182	12	9th OLA-A	Did not qualify
2005	22	2	20	0	139	284	4	12th OLA-A	Did not qualify
2006	22	0	22	0	144	297	0	12th OLA-A	Did not qualify
2007	18	8	8	2	145	147	18	8th OLA-A	Lost quarter-final
2008	22	13	9	0	192	145	26	5th OLA-A	Lost quarter-final
2009	22	17	5	0	284	200	34	3rd OLA-A	Lost semi-final
2010	22	12	10	0	253	211	24	5th OLA-A	Lost semi-final
2011	22	11	11	0	205	208	22	7th OLA-A	Lost quarter-final
*2012	20	10	9	1	209	217	21	6th OLA-A	Lost quarter-final
2013	20	14	5	1	225	176	29	3rd OLA-A	Lost quarter-final
2014	20	9	11	0	202	192	18	7th OLA-A	Lost quarter-final
2015	20	9	11	0	177	183	18	8th OLA-A	Lost quarter-final
2016	20	11	8	1	186	186	25	5th OLA-A	Lost quarter-final
2017	20	10	9	1	196	187	21	5th OLA-A	Lost quarter-final
2018	20	15	5	0	217	160	30	1st OLA-A	Lost quarter-final
2019	20	16	4	0	192	131	32	2nd OLA-A	Lost final
2020	Season cancelled due to COVID-19 pandemic								
2021	8	5	3	0	79	62	10	3rd of in 6 West; 5th of 11 in OJLL	Did not qualify
2022	20	10	10	0	206	169	20	3rd OJLL	Lost semi-final
2023	20	14	6	0	206	174	28	2nd OJLL	Won Championship
2023 Minto Cup	5	5	0	0	51	37	10	1st Minto	Won 1st - Minto Cup Canada
2024	20	10	10	0	183	180	20	4th OJLL	Lost quarter-final
2025	20	6	14	0	197	232	12	9th OJLL	Did not qualify
2026	18	6	12	0	168	185	12	5th of 6 in West 8th of 12 in OJLL	Lost quarter-final

== Team history ==
The team history stretches back to 1976 when they began as the Hamilton Bengals. As a Junior A team, they played formidable opponents like the Peterborough Gray-Munros, Whitby C.B.C Builders, Rexdale Warriors, Lakeshore Maple Leafs, and Bramalea Excelsiors, among others.

In their initial years, Wayne Stringer emerged as one of the top ten scorers, setting the momentum for the team. That same year, while the Victoria MacDonalds claimed the Minto Cup by beating the Bramalea Excelsiors, the Hamilton side was gearing up for their shot at the Cup. Their aspirations for the Minto in 1983 were short-lived as they were overtaken by St Catharines in a series ending 4 to 1.

By 1984, a transformative merge occurred. The Hamilton team joined forces with Burlington, resulting in the creation of the Bay Area Bengals. This collaboration bore fruit with a Tier 2 Championship win in 1985, just one year post the merger. The Bengals flag soared high until 1991.

The team was known as the Burlington Chiefs from 1992 to 2023. In 2023, it was renamed the Burlington Blaze and won the Minto Cup.[1]

Though they are officially registered as the Bay Area Bengals Lacrosse Club today, they are known and operate as the Burlington Blaze. The team has a long legacy of NLL Entry Draft players.
