= Peterborough Lakers Jr. A =

Junior "A" box lacrosse team from Peterborough, Ontario

Peterborough Jr Lakers
- Sport: Box lacrosse
- Founded: 1300
- League: OLA Junior A Lacrosse League
- Based in: Peterborough, Ontario
- Arena: Peterborough Memorial Centre
- Colours: Blue, Green, and White
- Head coach: Robert Hope
- General manager: Lee Vitarelli

The Peterborough Lakers are Junior "A" box lacrosse team from Peterborough, Ontario, Canada. The Lakers play in the OLA Junior A Lacrosse League.

== History ==
Peterborough Filter Queens 1950–1952
Peterborough Pat's 1953
Peterborough Pete's 1954-1956
Peterborough UEW's 1957–1958
Peterborough Pete's 1959–1960
Hastings Legionnaires 1961–1967
Peterborough Petes 1968
Peterborough Tee-Pees 1969–1973
Peterborough Gray-Munros 1974–1979
Peterborough Century 21 1980–1981

Peterborough James Gang 1982–1984
Peterborough Maulers 1985–1993
Peterborough Traders 1994
Peterborough Javelins 1995–1998
Peterborough Lakers 1999 to Present

== Season-by-season results ==
Note: GP = Games played, W = Wins, L = Losses, T = Ties, Pts = Points, GF = Goals for, GA = Goals against

| Season | GP | W | L | T | GF | GA | PTS | Placing | Playoffs |
|---|---|---|---|---|---|---|---|---|---|
| 1961 | 20 | 14 | 6 | 0 | 300 | 195 | 34 | 2nd OLA-A | Won League, won Minto Cup |
| 1962 | 20 | 19 | 1 | 0 | 295 | 158 | 38 | 1st OLA-A | Lost final |
| 1963 | 24 | 3 | 21 | 0 | 197 | 323 | 6 | 8th OLA-A | DNQ |
| 1964 | 24 | 10 | 14 | 0 | 250 | 258 | 20 | 6th OLA-A | Lost quarter-final |
| 1965 | 20 | 11 | 8 | 1 | 270 | 255 | 23 | 3rd OLA-A | Lost semi-final |
| 1966 | 24 | 7 | 17 | 0 | 273 | 319 | 14 | 8th OLA-A | Lost semi-final |
| 1967 | 24 | 9 | 15 | 0 | 253 | 308 | 18 | 6th OLA-A | Lost quarter-final |
| 1968 | 24 | 9 | 14 | 1 | 256 | 318 | 19 | 6th OLA-A | Lost quarter-final |
| 1969 | 24 | 3 | 21 | 0 | 292 | 613 | 6 | 9th OLA-A | DNQ |
| 1970 | 28 | 12 | 16 | 0 | 334 | 356 | 24 | 6th OLA-A | Lost quarter-final |
| 1971 | 30 | 19 | 11 | 0 | 450 | 389 | 38 | 2nd OLA-A | Won League |
| 1972 | 28 | 28 | 0 | 0 | 478 | 242 | 56 | 1st OLA-A | Won League, won Minto Cup |
| 1973 | 28 | 26 | 2 | 0 | 459 | 262 | 52 | 1st OLA-A | Won League, won Minto Cup |
| 1974 | 28 | 28 | 0 | 0 | 606 | 244 | 56 | 1st OLA-A | Won League, won Minto Cup |
| 1975 | 28 | 22 | 5 | 1 | 510 | 308 | 43 | 1st OLA-A | Won League, won Minto Cup |
| 1976 | 26 | 20 | 5 | 1 | 457 | 314 | 41 | 1st OLA-A East | Lost final |
| 1977 | 22 | 15 | 6 | 1 | 318 | 252 | 31 | 4th OLA-A | Lost final |
| 1978 | 30 | 21 | 9 | 0 | 486 | 356 | 42 | 2nd OLA-A East | Lost semi-final |
| 1979 | 28 | 22 | 6 | 0 | 368 | 295 | 44 | 3rd OLA-A East | Won League |
| 1980 | 20 | 12 | 8 | 0 | 266 | 199 | 24 | 3rd OLA-A | Lost final |
| 1981 | 20 | 20 | 0 | 0 | 342 | 162 | 40 | 1st OLA-A | Won League, won Minto Cup |
| 1982 | 20 | 17 | 3 | 0 | 354 | 143 | 34 | 1st OLA-A | Won League, won Minto Cup |
| 1983 | 22 | 21 | 1 | 0 | 360 | 144 | 42 | 1st OLA-A | Won League, won Minto Cup |
| 1984 | 24 | 21 | 3 | 0 | 408 | 225 | 42 | 2nd OLA-A | Lost final |
| 1985 | 24 | 18 | 6 | 0 | 363 | 201 | 36 | 2nd OLA-A | Lost final |
| 1986 | 20 | 20 | 0 | 0 | 347 | 145 | 40 | 1st OLA-A | Won League, won Minto Cup |
| 1987 | 25 | 25 | 0 | 0 | 454 | 149 | 50 | 1st OLA-A | Won League, won Minto Cup |
| 1988 | 24 | 23 | 1 | 0 | 405 | 152 | 46 | 1st OLA-A | Won League |
| 1989 | 24 | 20 | 3 | 1 | 304 | 165 | 41 | 1st OLA-A | Won League, won Minto Cup |
| 1990 | 20 | 17 | 3 | 0 | 242 | 171 | 34 | 2nd OLA-A | Lost final |
| 1991 | 20 | 8 | 11 | 1 | 172 | 188 | 17 | 9th OLA-A | DNQ |
| 1992 | 20 | 8 | 11 | 1 | 223 | 237 | 17 | 9th OLA-A | DNQ |
| 1993 | 22 | 15 | 7 | 0 | 314 | 235 | 30 | 3rd OLA-A | Lost quarter-final |
| 1994 | 26 | 20 | 5 | 1 | 395 | 281 | 41 | 1st OLA-A East | Lost final |
| 1995 | 20 | 12 | 8 | 0 | 228 | 186 | 24 | 5th OLA-A | Lost semi-final |
| 1996 | 20 | 10 | 10 | 0 | 222 | 216 | 20 | 4th OLA-A | Lost semi-final |
| 1997 | 18 | 11 | 7 | 0 | 219 | 190 | 22 | 4th OLA-A | Lost semi-final |
| 1998 | 22 | 11 | 11 | 0 | 243 | 247 | 22 | 7th OLA-A | Lost quarter-final |
| 1999 | 20 | 12 | 8 | 0 | 227 | 229 | 24 | 5th OLA-A | Lost quarter-final |
| 2000 | 20 | 9 | 11 | 0 | 186 | 202 | 18 | 6th OLA-A | Lost quarter-final |
| 2001 | 20 | 11 | 9 | 0 | 191 | 189 | 22 | 6th OLA-A | Lost semi-final |
| 2002 | 20 | 14 | 6 | 0 | 209 | 161 | 28 | 3rd OLA-A | Lost semi-final |
| 2003 | 20 | 10 | 10 | 0 | 208 | 188 | 20 | 6th OLA-A | Lost quarter-final |
| 2004 | 20 | 9 | 11 | 0 | 180 | 194 | 18 | 7th OLA-A | Lost quarter-final |
| 2005 | 22 | 15 | 7 | 0 | 224 | 193 | 30 | 4th OLA-A | Lost semi-final |
| 2006 | 22 | 12 | 10 | 0 | 232 | 188 | 24 | 5th OLA-A | Lost final, won Minto Cup |
| 2007 | 18 | 10 | 7 | 1 | 154 | 143 | 21 | 5th OLA-A | Lost quarter-final |
| 2008 | 22 | 10 | 10 | 2 | 147 | 171 | 22 | 7th OLA-A | Lost quarter-final |
| 2009 | 22 | 11 | 11 | 0 | 225 | 217 | 22 | 6th OLA-A | Lost quarter-final |
| 2010 | 22 | 9 | 13 | 0 | 196 | 205 | 18 | 8th OLA-A | Lost quarter-final |
| 2011 | 22 | 13 | 8 | 1 | 210 | 198 | 27 | 5th OLA-A | Lost semi-final |
| 2012 | 20 | 14 | 5 | 1 | 240 | 201 | 29 | 4th OLA-A | Lost semi-final |
| 2013 | 20 | 11 | 9 | 0 | 229 | 192 | 22 | 6th OLA-A | Lost semi-final |
| 2014 | 20 | 12 | 8 | 0 | 225 | 201 | 24 | 5th OLA-A | Lost semi-final |
| 2015 | 20 | 15 | 5 | 0 | 211 | 175 | 30 | 2nd OLA-A | Lost final |
| 2016 | 20 | 5 | 15 | 0 | 153 | 198 | 10 | 11th OLA-A | DNQ |
| 2017 | 20 | 5 | 13 | 2 | 152 | 197 | 12 | 10th OLA-A | DNQ |
| 2018 | 20 | 3 | 17 | 0 | 127 | 215 | 6 | 10th OLA-A | DNQ |
| 2019 | 20 | 6 | 14 | 0 | 96 | 179 | 12 | 10th OLA-A | DNQ |
| 2020 | Season cancelled due to COVID-19 pandemic | | | | | | | | |
| 2021 | 8 | 1 | 7 | 0 | 47 | 69 | 2 | 5th of 5 East; 10th of 11 OJLL | Did not qualify |
