= Minto Cup =

Canadian lacrosse championship trophy

- Current season, competition or edition: 2026 Minto Cup Tournament
- Sport: Box Lacrosse
- Founded: 1901
- Country: Canada
- Most recent champion: Raiders Lacrosse Club (2026)
- Most titles: Peterborough Lakers (11 titles)

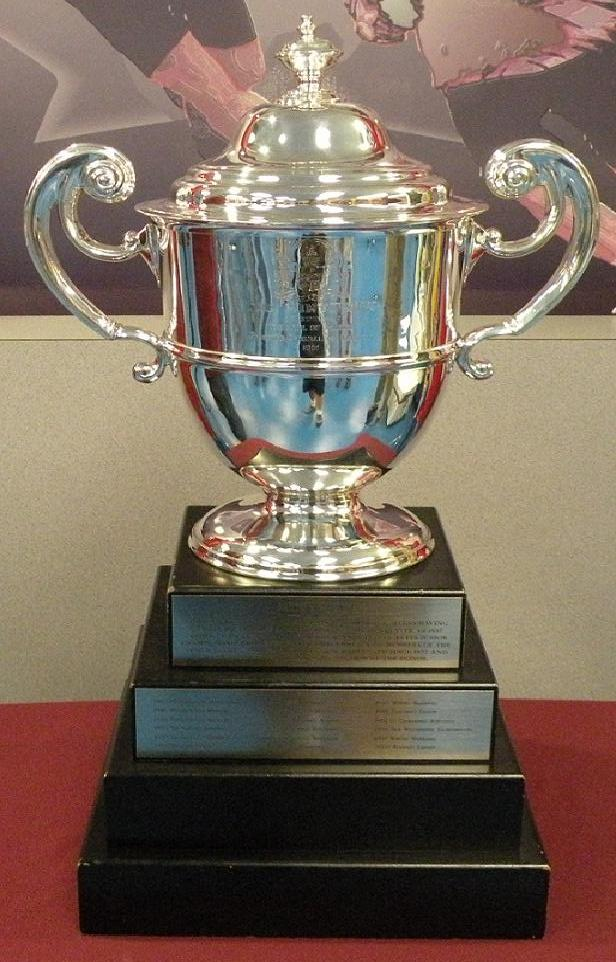
The Minto Cup

The Minto Cup is awarded annually to the champion junior men's box lacrosse team of Canada. The 2026 competition is in Calgary, Alberta, from August 16-23.

It was donated in 1901 by the Governor General, Lord Minto. Originally restricted to amateurs, within three years the first under-the-table professional teams were already competing for it. After 1904, with efforts to keep the professionals out of competition proving to be futile, it was made open to all challengers.

The last successful amateur challenge came in 1908 when New Westminster Salmonbellies won it; the last amateur challenge was made in 1913 by Vancouver Athletic Club. This would be the only time in Canadian lacrosse history when the Mann Cup champions (Vancouver) faced the Minto Cup champions (New Westminster) head-to-head – with the silverware (Minto) going to the winner.

With the professionals essentially in control of the cup by 1910, the newly inaugurated Mann Cup became the replacement for the senior men's national amateur championship.

The Minto Cup professional competition was dominated by the New Westminster Salmonbellies, who held the trophy for 21 of the 29 years in which it was contested (the competition was suspended during World War I). 1924 was the last year professionals played for the Minto Cup—after the Coast professional league folded in June 1924, it was then placed into storage and for a time lost and forgotten when the last trustee died. The trophy was located just prior to the 1938 junior competition, underneath a desk in his office. During the trophy's period of inactivity, there were suggestions to make the Minto Cup an international championship trophy.

In 1934 the last trustee appointed to supervise the Cup died, and the Lord Minto of the day eventually transferred it to the Canadian Lacrosse Association, which decided to award it as the trophy for the national junior men's champion, starting in 1937. Originally, the competition was between all-star provincial teams formed by adding players to the provincial champion. In 1960 this practice was abandoned and the trophy has since been competed for by the Junior A provincial champions of British Columbia of the British Columbia Junior A Lacrosse League, Ontario of the Ontario Junior A Lacrosse League and recently Alberta, of the RMLL the only provinces where organized lacrosse thrives.

== Champions ==
=== Senior Amateur Champions (1901–1903) ===
- 1901 Ottawa Capitals - defeated Cornwall Lacrosse Club
- 1901 Montreal Shamrocks - defeated Cornwall Lacrosse Club and Vancouver YMCA
- 1902 Montreal Shamrocks - won cup through league play; defeated New Westminster Salmonbellies
- 1903 Montreal Shamrocks - defeated Brantford Lacrosse Club

=== Professional/Senior Champions (1904–1908) ===
- 1904 Montreal Shamrocks - won cup through league play
- 1905 Montreal Shamrocks - defeated St. Catharines Athletics
- 1906 Montreal Shamrocks - defeated Souris (Manitoba)
- 1906 Ottawa Capitals - defeated Toronto Tecumsehs
- 1907 Montreal Shamrocks - won cup through league play
- 1908 New Westminster Salmonbellies - defeated Montreal Shamrocks and Ottawa Capitals

=== Professional Champions (1909–1924) ===
- 1909 New Westminster Salmonbellies - defeated Regina Capitals and Toronto Tecumsehs
- 1910 New Westminster Salmonbellies - defeated Montreal Lacrosse Club and Montreal Nationals
- 1911 Vancouver Lacrosse Club - defeated New Westminster and Toronto Tecumsehs
- 1912 New Westminster Salmonbellies - defeated Cornwall
- 1913 New Westminster Salmonbellies - defeated Vancouver Athletic Club
- 1914 New Westminster Salmonbellies - won by default
- 1915 New Westminster Salmonbellies - defeated Vancouver Lacrosse Club
- 1916 no competition
- 1917 no competition
- 1918 Vancouver "Greenshirts" - claim disputed by New Westminster
- 1919 New Westminster Salmonbellies - defeated Vancouver Terminals
- 1920 Vancouver Terminals - defeated New Westminster
- 1921 New Westminster Salmonbellies defeated Vancouver Terminals
- 1922 New Westminster Salmonbellies defeated Vancouver Terminals
- 1924 New Westminster Salmonbellies - won by default
- 1925–1936 no competition for trophy; placed in storage by Trustee (New Westminster Salmonbellies claims the titles for these years of non-competition)

=== Junior Champions (1937–Present) ===
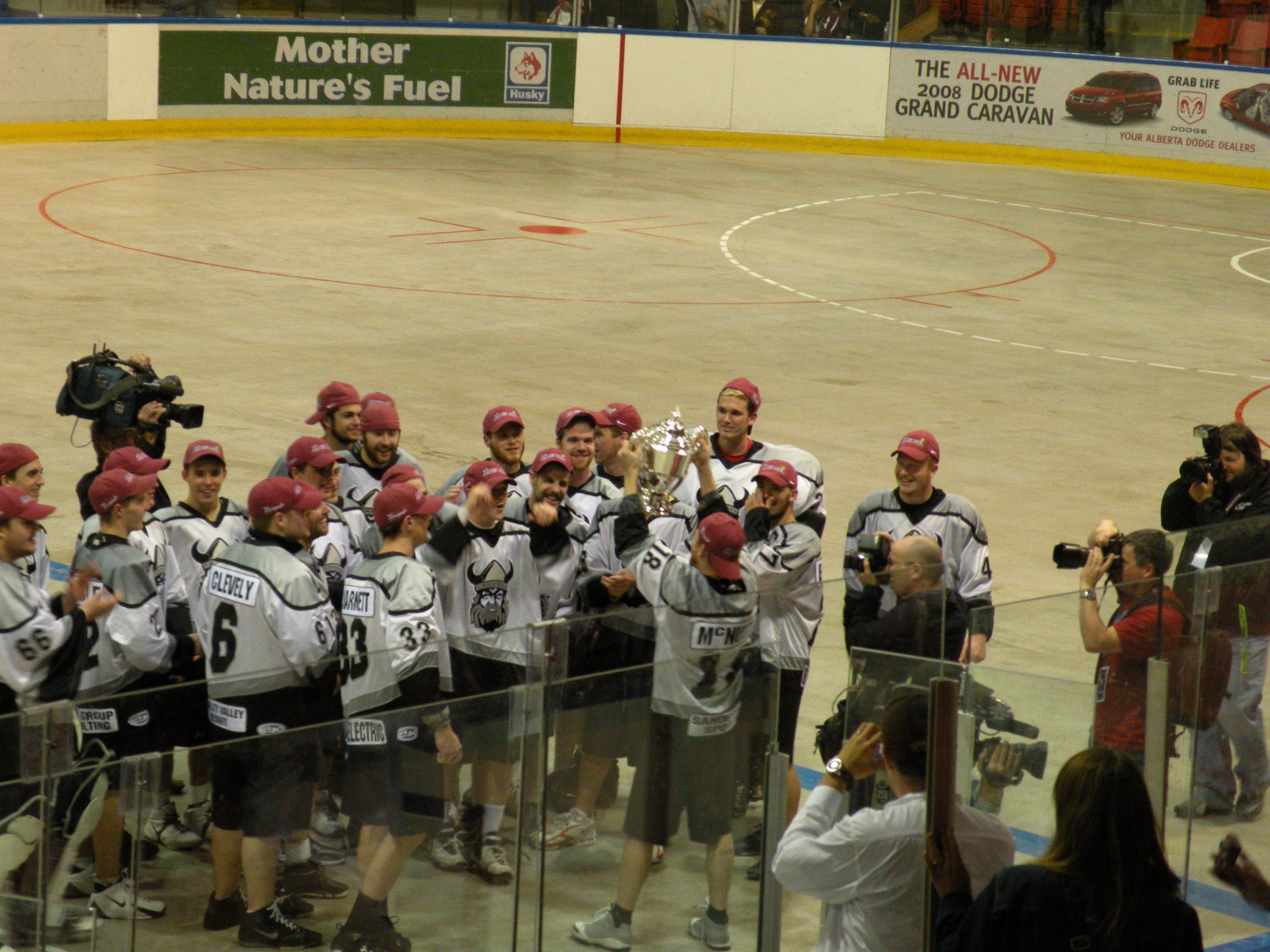
The Orangeville Northmen celebrate their 2008 championship in Calgary.

- 1937 Orillia Terriers - defeated Vancouver Burrard Bluebirds
- 1938 Mimico Mountaineers - defeated Richmond-Point Grey Juniors
- 1939 no decision
- 1940 Ontario All-Stars - defeated British Columbia All-Stars
- 1941–1946, no competition
- 1947 St. Catharines Athletics - defeated Vancouver Burrard BC All-Stars
- 1948 Vancouver Burrards - defeated St. Catharines Athletics
- 1949 Vancouver Norburn Eagletime - defeated Ontario All-Stars
- 1950 St. Catharines Athletics - defeated Vancouver Burrard BC All-Stars
- 1951 Mimico Mountaineers - defeated Manitoba All-Stars
- 1952 Brampton Excelsiors - defeated Vancouver Kerrisdale BC All-Stars
- 1953 New Westminster Salmonacs - defeated Long Branch Monarchs
- 1954 Vancouver PNE Junior Indians - defeated Manitoba All-Stars
- 1955 Long Branch Monarchs - defeated Manitoba All-Stars
- 1956 Mount Pleasant (Vancouver) No.177 Legionnaires - defeated Brampton Excelsiors
- 1957 Brampton ABC's - defeated Victoria Shamrocks
- 1958 Brampton ABC's - defeated Victoria Shamrocks
- 1959 Brampton ABC's - defeated New Westminster Salmonbellies
- 1960 New Westminster Salmonbellies - defeated Whitby Red Wings
- 1961 Hastings Legionnaires - defeated Burnaby Norburns
- 1962 Victoria Shamrocks - defeated Brampton Armstrongs

Year	Champion	Finalist	Series	Scores
1963	Oshawa Green Gaels (ON)	Victoria Shamrocks (BC)	4-2 gms
1964	Oshawa Green Gaels (ON)	New Westminster Salmonbellies (BC)	4-1 gms
1965	Oshawa Green Gaels (ON)	New Westminster Salmonbellies (BC)	4-2 gms
1966	Oshawa Green Gaels (ON)	New Westminster Salmonbellies (BC)	4-2 gms
1967	Oshawa Green Gaels (ON)	New Westminster Salmonbellies (BC)
1968	Oshawa Green Gaels (ON)	New Westminster Salmonbellies (BC)
1969	Oshawa Green Gaels (ON)	South Vancouver Legion (BC)	4-0 gms
1970	Lakeshore Maple Leafs (ON)	Burnaby Cablevision (BC)	4-0 gms
1971	Richmond Roadrunners (BC)	Peterborough PCO's (ON)	4-3 gms
1972	Peterborough PCO's (ON)	Richmond Roadrunners (BC)	4-0 gms
1973	Peterborough PCO's (ON)	Richmond Roadrunners (BC)	4-3 gms
1974	Peterborough PCO's (ON)	Burnaby Cablevision (BC)
1975	Peterborough Gray-Munros (ON)	Burnaby Cablevision (BC)	4-1 gms
1976	Victoria MacDonalds (BC)	Bramelea Excelsiors (ON)	4-0 gms
1977	Burnaby Cablevision (BC)	Whitby CBC Builders (ON)	4-2 gms
1978	Burnaby Cablevision (BC)	Whitby CBC Builders (ON)	4-1 gms
1979	Burnaby Cablevision (BC)	Peterborough Gray-Munros (ON)
1980	Whitby CBC Builders (ON)	New Westminster Salmonbellies (BC)	4-1 gms
1981	Peterborough James Gang (ON)	Burnaby Cablevision (BC)	4-0 gms
1982	Peterborough James Gang (ON)	Victoria-Esquimalt Legion (BC)	4-1 gms
1983	Peterborough James Gang (ON)	Etobicoke Eclipse (ON)
1984	Whitby Warriors (ON)	New Westminster Salmonbellies (BC)
1985	Whitby Warriors (ON)	Victoria-Esquimalt Legion (BC)	4-3 gms
1986	Peterborough Maulers (ON)	Victoria-Esquimalt Legion (BC)	11-7
1987	Peterborough Maulers (ON)	Victoria-Esquimalt Legion (BC)
1988	Victoria-Esquimalt Legion (BC)	Coquitlam Adanacs (BC)	2-0 gms
1989	Peterborough Maulers (ON)	Richmond Outlaws (BC)	4-1 gms
1990	St. Catharines Athletics (ON)	Richmond Outlaws (BC)	2-1 gms
1991	St. Catharines Athletics (ON)	Victoria Eagles (BC)	4-1 gms
1992	Six Nations Arrows (ON)	Coquitlam Adanacs (BC)	4-3 gms
1993	Orangeville Northmen (ON)	Coquitlam Adanacs (BC)	4-0 gms
1994	New Westminster Salmonbellies (BC)	Brampton Excelsiors (ON)	4-3 gms
1995	Orangeville Northmen (ON)	New Westminster Salmonbellies (BC)	4-0 gms
1996	Orangeville Northmen (ON)	Burnaby Lakers (BC)	4-3 gms
1997	Whitby Warriors (ON)	Burnaby Lakers (BC)	4-2 gms
1998	Burnaby Lakers (BC)	Six Nations Arrows (ON)	4-1 gms
1999	Whitby Warriors (ON)	Burnaby Lakers (BC)	4-1 gms
2000	Burnaby Lakers (BC)	Orangeville Northmen (ON)	4-2 gms
2001	St. Catharines Athletics (ON)	Burnaby Lakers (BC)	4-2 gms
2002	Burnaby Lakers (BC)	St. Catharines Athletics (ON)	4-2 gms
2003	St. Catharines Athletics (ON)	Burnaby Lakers (BC)	2-1 gms
2004; Burnaby & Victoria, BC	Burnaby Lakers (BCJALL)	Victoria Shamrocks (BCJALL)	2-0	6-3, 13-5
2005; Edmonton, AB	Burnaby Lakers (BCJALL)	Six Nations Arrows (OJALL)	2-1	9-11, 13-12, 8-6
2006; Whitby, ON	Peterborough Lakers (OJALL)	Six Nations Arrows (OJALL)	1-0	9-5
2007; New Westminster, BC	Six Nations Arrows (OJALL)	Burnaby Lakers (BCJALL)	1-0	19-8
2008; Calgary, AB	Orangeville Northmen (OJALL)	Victoria Shamrocks (BCJALL)	1-0	9-4
2009; Brampton, ON	Orangeville Northmen (OJALL)	Brampton Excelsiors (OJALL)	2-1	10-9, 8-11, 8-4
2010; Coquitlam, BC	Coquitlam Adanacs (BCJALL)	Orangeville Northmen (OJALL)	2-0	9-6, 8-4
2011; Okotoks, AB	Whitby Warriors (OJALL)	Coquitlam Adanacs (BCJALL)	2-1	9-12, 5-4, 12-7
2012; Whitby, ON	Orangeville Northmen (OJALL)	Coquitlam Adanacs (BCJALL)	2-0	19-6, 9-4
2013; New Westminster, BC	Whitby Warriors (OJALL)	New Westminster Salmonbellies (BCJALL)	3-1	16-6, 7-9, 13-4, 10-8 OT
2014; Langley, BC	Six Nations Arrows (OJALL)	Coquitlam Adanacs (BCJALL)	4-2	6-7, 6-11, 19-5, 10-7, 12-7, 14-8
2015; Hagersville, ON	Six Nations Arrows (OJALL)	Coquitlam Adanacs (BCJALL)	4-2	7-9, 9-8 OT, 8-5, 4-5, 8-2, 9-4
2016; Langley, BC	Coquitlam Adanacs (BCJALL)	Orangeville Northmen (OJALL)	3-2	3-2, 6-9, 9-7, 5-6, 6-5 OT
2017; Brampton, ON	Six Nations Arrows (OJALL)	Coquitlam Adanacs (BCJALL)	3-0	12-7, 9-4, 8-3
2018; Calgary, AB	Coquitlam Adanacs (BCJALL)	Brampton Excelsiors (OJALL)	3-1	11-9, 8-6, 6-8, 10-8 OT
2019; Victoria, BC	Orangeville Northmen (OJALL)	Victoria Shamrocks (BCJALL)	3-0	10-8, 11-5, 7-5
2022; Brampton, ON	Whitby Warriors (OJLL)	Edmonton Miners (RMLL)	2-1	12-8, 8-9 OT, 6-5
2023; Edmonton, AB	Burlington Blaze (OJLL)	Coquitlam Adanacs (BCJALL)	2-0	10-9 OT, 12-7
2024; Coquitlam, BC	Coquitlam Adanacs (BCJALL)	Orangeville Northmen (OJALL)	2-0	14-7, 9-6
2025 St. Catherines, ON	Coquitlam Adanacs (BCJALL)	Orangeville Northmen (OJALL)	2-0	7-5, 11-10
2026 Calgary, AB	Raiders Lacrosse Club (RMLL)	Victoria Shamrocks (BCJALL)	2-1	9-7, 6-14, 9-6

== See also ==
- List of awards presented by the governor general of Canada
- List of awards named after governors general of Canada
