= Six Nations Arrows =

- Sport: Box lacrosse
- Founded: 1974
- League: OLA Junior A Lacrosse League
- Based in: Ohsweken, Ontario on the Six Nations of the Grand River Reserve
- Arena: Iroquois Lacrosse Arena
- Colours: Orange, Black, and White
- Head coach: Johnny Powless
- General manager: Scott Smith
- National championships: 1992, 2007, 2014, 2015, 2017
- League titles: OLA - 1992, 1998, 2004, 2005, 2006, 2007, 2014, 2015, 2017

The Six Nations Arrows are Canadian Junior "A" box lacrosse team from Ohsweken, Ontario on the Six Nations of the Grand River Reserve. The Arrows play in the OLA Junior A Lacrosse League.

In 2021, the Arrows announced that they'd be leaving the OLA for a new league, the Tewaaraton Lacrosse League. In response the OLA was quick to establish a new Six Nations Arrows team, to take over the original Arrows franchise history in the OLA. The "new" Arrows completed their first season of play in the shortened 2021 OLA Junior A Lacrosse League season, and continue to play in the league. Meanwhile the "original" Arrows franchise has yet to play a game since leaving the OLA as it is becoming ever increasingly unlikely the TLL will ever manage to get off the ground. While there has been no official announcement of folding, neither the "Original" Arrows, TLL, or any other of it member franchises have had any sort of notable on floor activity, internet activity, transactions or announcements since the spring of 2022.

== History ==
Six Nations Braves 1974 - 1979
Six Nations Arrows 1980 to Present

*2012 Season: The Ontario Lacrosse League implements a goals for/goals against ruling when two teams are tied with the same number of points at the end of the season, AND those two teams have split the outcomes of their own games equally. Six Nations outscored Whitby by 2 goals between their two games, hence giving Six Nations the 1st place seed in the tie-break and the 1st overall seed in the OLA-A standings.

*2016 Season: The Arrows organization forfeit four games due ineligible player, Oliver Bolsterli - former property of the London Blue Devils. Bolsterli played seven games for the Arrows; however, the Blue Devils did not register him as an active OLA player until June 20. The Arrows appealed the League's decision. On July 14 the Arrows won their appeal, as the ruling was ultimately overturned by the Ontario Lacrosse Association; the Arrows finish 1st overall for the fifth straight season.

== Season-by-season results ==
Note: GP = Games played, W = Wins, L = Losses, T = Ties, Pts = Points, GF = Goals for, GA = Goals against

Season	GP	W	L	T	GF	GA	PTS	Placing	Playoffs
1974	24	10	14	0	293	392	20	3rd OLA-C West	Lost semi-final
1975	24	10	14	0	378	403	20	5th OLA-B West	Lost semi-final
1976	24	17	7	0	423	372	34	3rd OLA-B West	Lost 1st round
1977	20	14	6	0	404	331	28	2nd OLA-B West	Lost 2nd round
1978	22	17	5	0	475	291	34	2nd OLA-B Central	Lost quarter-finals
1979	22	17	5	0	425	289	34	1st OLA-B West	Lost semi-finals
1980	16	13	3	0	298	222	26	1st OLA-B West	Lost semi-finals
1981	20	10	10	0	346	335	20	4th OLA-B West	Lost quarter-final
1982	24	10	13	1	331	403	21	5th OLA-B West	Did not qualify
1983	20	4	15	1	286	413	9	5th OLA-B West	Did not qualify
1984	20	6	13	1	310	389	13	4th OLA-B Div I	Lost Tier II Semi-final
1985	24	2	22	0	299	509	4	7th OLA-B West	Lost Tier II Final
1986	20	1	19	0	183	490	2	6th OLA-B West	Lost Tier II Semi-final
1987	24	1	23	0	270	489	2	7th OLA-B West	Won Tier II Title
1988	20	6	14	0	198	343	12	5th OLA-B West	Did not qualify
1989	20	9	11	0	223	249	18	7th OLA-B	Lost quarter-final
1990	20	5	15	0	222	269	10	7th OLA-A	Did not qualify
1991	20	12	8	0	274	256	24	3rd OLA-A	Lost final
1992	20	13	6	1	267	217	27	3rd OLA-A	Won League, won Minto Cup
1993	22	12	10	0	249	191	24	6th OLA-A	Lost semi-finals
1994	26	13	13	0	331	323	26	3rd OLA-A West	Lost quarter-final
1995	20	5	15	0	182	273	10	9th OLA-A	Did not qualify
1996	20	5	13	2	198	243	12	9th OLA-A	Did not qualify
1997	18	12	6	0	261	194	24	3rd OLA-A	Lost final
1998	22	19	3	0	341	199	38	1st OLA-A	Won League, Minto Cup Finalist
1999	20	16	3	1	209	124	33	3rd OLA-A	Lost final
2000	20	16	3	1	241	164	33	1st OLA-A	Lost semi-finals
2001	20	16	4	0	222	152	32	1st OLA-A	Lost final
2002	20	9	11	0	206	207	18	6th OLA-A	Lost quarter-finals
2003	20	8	12	0	177	221	16	8th OLA-A	Lost quarter-finals
2004	20	13	7	0	186	153	26	4th OLA-A	Won League, OLA Minto Cup Rep
2005	22	19	3	0	245	130	38	1st OLA-A	Won League, Minto Cup Finalist
2006	22	19	3	0	268	117	38	1st OLA-A	Won League, Minto Cup Finalist
2007	18	17	0	1	198	101	35	1st OLA-A	Won League, won Minto Cup
2008	22	16	6	0	195	144	32	2nd OLA-A	Lost final
2009	22	15	6	1	235	170	31	4th OLA-A	Lost semi-finals
2010	22	18	4	0	239	115	36	2nd OLA-A	Lost final
2011	22	18	4	0	286	158	36	2nd OLA-A	Lost semi-finals
*2012	20	17	3	0	271	152	34	1st OLA-A	Lost final
2013	20	17	3	0	243	141	34	1st OLA-A	Lost final
2014	20	16	4	0	231	131	32	1st OLA-A	Won League, won Minto Cup
2015	20	17	3	0	216	119	34	1st OLA-A	Won League, won Minto Cup
*2016	20	18	2	0	246	126	36	1st OLA-A	Lost final
2017	20	18	2	0	194	121	36	1st OLA-A	Won League, won Minto Cup
2018	20	11	9	0	190	152	22	6th OLA-A	Lost quarter-finals
2019	20	11	9	0	178	149	22	6th OLA-A	Lost quarter-finals
2020	Season cancelled due to COVID-19 pandemic								
2021	8	4	4	0	59	74	8	4th of 6 West; 7th of 11 OJLL	Did not qualify
2022	20	5	15	0	159	217	10	9th OLA-A	Did not qualify

== "New" Six Nations Arrows Season-by-season results ==
After the original Six Nations Arrows decided to leave the OLA for the TLL a "new" Six Nations Arrows team was created. They now participate in the Ontario Junior Lacrosse League or OJLL.

Season	GP	W	L	T	GF	GA	PTS	Placing	Playoffs
2023	20	7	13	0	175	228	14	8th OJLL	Lost quarter-finals
2024	20	9	11	0	162	174	18	7th OJLL	Lost quarter-finals
Total	40	16	24	0	337	402	32	2 Playoff Appearances	
