= Ontario Junior Lacrosse League =

Lacrosse league in Canada

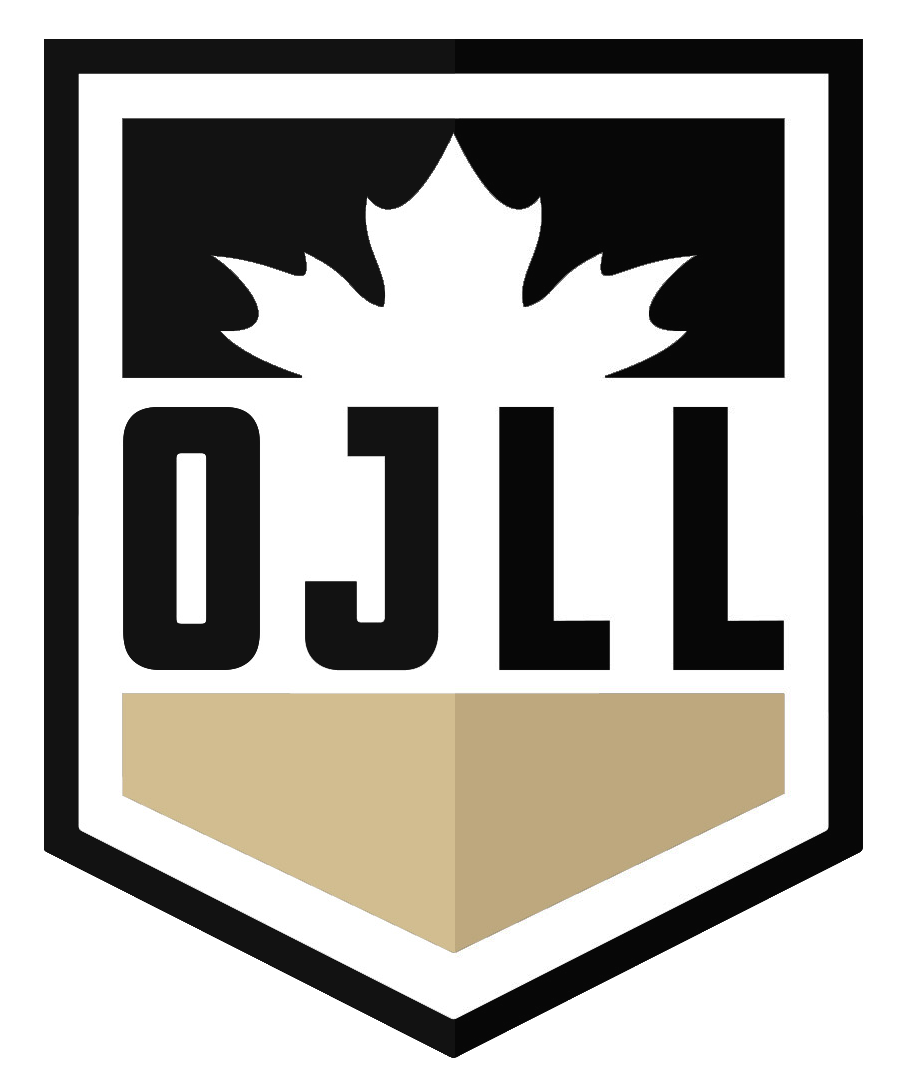
- Ontario Junior Lacrosse League
- Sport: Box lacrosse
- Founded: c. 1933
- Commissioner: Mark Grimes
- No. of teams: 11
- Country: Canada
- Most recent champion: St. Catharines Athletics (2026)

The Ontario Junior Lacrosse League (OJLL) is considered the most competitive Junior A men's box lacrosse league in the world and the number one source for talent for the National Lacrosse League (NLL). The OJLL is sanctioned by the Ontario Lacrosse Association. It is an 12 team league wherein the top 8 go to the playoffs and battle it out for top spot in Ontario. The Ontario Champion is annually awarded the Iroquois Trophy and moves on to compete against teams from Alberta and British Columbia for the Minto Cup - the Junior A National Box Lacrosse Championship of Canada. Ontario has captured the Minto Cup fifty-six times since 1937. Since the first NLL draft in 1996, sixteen OJLL alumni have been selected first overall.

== The teams ==
Team	Joined	Centre
Brampton Excelsiors	c. 1933	Brampton
Burlington Blaze	1976	Burlington
Kitchener-Waterloo LC	1991	Kitchener
Mimico Mountaineers	2015	Mimico
Oakville Buzz	2019	Oakville
Orangeville Northmen Jr. A	1991	Orangeville, ON
Peterborough Lakers	1961	Peterborough
St. Catharines Athletics	1982	St. Catharines
Six Nations Arrows	1990	Hagersville
Toronto Beaches	1991	Toronto
Whitby Warriors	1975	Whitby
Elora Hawks	2026	Elora

== 2021 OJLL Playoffs Bracket - Iroquois Trophy ==
Semifinals
W1	Athletics	7
E2	Mountaineers	6
E1	Warriors	7
W2	Excelsiors	8

Final
W1	Athletics	14
W2	Excelsiors	13

== The Iroquois Trophy playoff champions ==
Champion moves on to the Minto Cup national championship.

Year	Champion	Finalist	Series
1933	Mount Dennis	Brampton Excelsiors	2-0
1934
1935
1936
1937	Orillia Terriers
1938	Mimico Mounties	Orillia Terriers	2-0
1939	Orillia Terriers	St. Catharines Shamrocks	Protest
1940	Orillia Terriers	St. Catharines Shamrocks	2-1
Suspended due to World War II
1946	Mimico Mounties	Owen Sound Georgians	3-1
1947	St. Catharines Athletics	Mimico Mounties	3-0
1948	St. Catharines Athletics	Brampton Excelsiors	3-0
1949	St. Catharines Athletics	Mimico Mounties	2-1-1
1950	St. Catharines Athletics	Brampton Excelsiors	3-0
1951	Mimico Mounties	Peterborough Filter Queens	3-1
1952	Brampton Excelsiors	St. Catharines Athletics	4-0
1953	Long Branch Monarchs	Brampton Excelsiors	4-0
1954	Long Branch Monarchs	Newmarket Green Gaels	4-3
1955	Long Branch Monarchs	Newmarket Green Gaels	4-2
1956	Brampton Excelsiors	Long Branch Monarchs	4-2
1957	Brampton ABC's	Peterborough UEW's	4-3
1958	Brampton Excelsiors	Long Branch Castrolites
1959	Brampton Excelsiors	St. Catharines Athletics	4-1
1960	Whitby Red Wings	Brampton Excelsiors	4-2
1961	Hastings Legionnaires	Brampton Excelsiors	4-3
1962	Brampton ABC's	Hastings Legionnaires	4-2
1963	Oshawa Green Gaels	Brampton ABC's	4-2
1964	Oshawa Green Gaels	Bramalea ABC's	4-0
1965	Oshawa Green Gaels	Mimico Mountaineers	4-0
1966	Oshawa Green Gaels	Mimico Mountaineers	4-0
1967	Oshawa Green Gaels	Toronto Township PCO's	4-1
1968	Oshawa Green Gaels	Mississauga PCO's	4-1
1969	Oshawa Green Gaels	Lakeshore Maple Leafs	4-0
1970	Lakeshore Maple Leafs	Bramalea Excelsiors	4-3
1971	Peterborough PCO's	Etobicoke PCO's	4-2
1972	Peterborough PCO's	Oshawa Green Gaels	4-0
1973	Peterborough PCO's	Bramalea Excelsiors	4-2
1974	Peterborough PCO's	Mississauga Athletics	4-0
1975	Peterborough Gray Munros	Mississauga Chiefs	4-1
1976	Bramalea Excelsiors	Peterborough Gray Munros	4-2
1977	Whitby Consolidated Builders	Peterborough Gray Munros	4-1
1978	Whitby Consolidated Builders	Elora Mohawks	4-0
1979	Peterborough Century 21	Oshawa Green Gaels	4-3
1980	Whitby Consolidated Builders	Peterborough Century 21	4-2
1981	Peterborough James Gang	Oshawa Green Gaels	4-3
1982	Peterborough James Gang	Oshawa Green Gaels	4-0
1983	Peterborough James Gang	Etobicoke Eclipse	4-0
1984	Whitby Warriors	Peterborough 'A' Team	4-1
1985	Whitby Warriors	Peterborough Maulers	4-0
1986	Peterborough Maulers	St. Catharines Athletics	4-0
1987	Peterborough Maulers	St. Catharines Athletics	4-0
1988	Peterborough Maulers	Whitby Warriors	4-0
1989	Peterborough Maulers	St. Catharines Athletics	4-3
1990	St. Catharines Athletics	Peterborough Maulers	4-1
1991	St. Catharines Athletics	Six Nations Arrows	4-1
1992	Six Nations Arrows	St. Catharines Athletics	4-0
1993	Orangeville Northmen	St. Catharines Athletics	4-1
1994	Brampton Excelsiors	Peterborough Traders	4-2
1995	Orangeville Northmen	St. Catharines Athletics	4-0
1996	Orangeville Northmen	Whitby Warriors	4-1
1997	Whitby Warriors	Six Nations Arrows	4-3
1998	Six Nations Arrows	St. Catharines Athletics	4-3
1999	Whitby Warriors	Six Nations Arrows	4-1
2000	Orangeville Northmen	St. Catharines Athletics	4-1
2001	St. Catharines Athletics	Six Nations Arrows	4-1
2002	St. Catharines Athletics	Toronto Beaches	4-0
2003	St. Catharines Athletics	Orangeville Northmen	4-0
2004	Six Nations Arrows	Whitby Warriors	4-3
2005	Six Nations Arrows	Orangeville Northmen	4-1
2006	Six Nations Arrows	Peterborough Lakers	4-1
2007	Six Nations Arrows	Orangeville Northmen	4-2
2008	Orangeville Northmen	Six Nations Arrows	4-1
2009	Orangeville Northmen	Brampton Excelsiors	4-3
2010	Orangeville Northmen	Six Nations Arrows	4-0
2011	Whitby Warriors	Orangeville Northmen	4-3
2012	Orangeville Northmen	Six Nations Arrows	4-1
2013	Whitby Warriors	Six Nations Arrows	4-3
2014	Six Nations Arrows	Whitby Warriors	4-0
2015	Six Nations Arrows	Peterborough Lakers	4-1
2016	Orangeville Northmen	Six Nations Arrows	4-0
2017	Six Nations Arrows	Mimico Mountaineers	3-0
2018	Brampton Excelsiors	Orangeville Northmen	4-1
2019	Orangeville Northmen	Burlington Chiefs	4-1
2020 Season Cancelled due to COVID-19
2021	St. Catherines Athletics	Brampton Excelsiors	14—13
2022	Whitby Warriors	Toronto Beaches	2-0
2023	Burlington Blaze	Orangeville Northmen	4-2
2024	Orangeville Northmen	Mimico Mountaineers	4-3
2025	Orangeville Northmen	Whitby Warriors	4-2
2026	St. Catherines Athletics	Whitby Warriors	4-2

== Former member teams ==
Akwesasne Indians (Folded in 2012)
Elora Mohawks (Promoted to Jr A status in 2026 again)
Hamilton Bengals
Huntsville Hawks
Mississauga Tomahawks (Relocated to Mimico in 2015)
Orillia Rama Kings
Oshawa Green Gaels
Ottawa Titans
Rexdale Warriors
Scarborough Saints
Sarnia Pacers
Windsor Warlocks
