= Sean Greenhalgh (lacrosse) =

Canadian lacrosse player

Personal information
- Nationality: Canadian
- Born: July 15, 1982 (age 43) St. Catharines, Ontario
- Height: 5 ft 10 in (178 cm)
- Weight: 185 lb (84 kg; 13 st 3 lb)

Sport
- Position: Forward
- NLL draft: 3rd overall, 2005; Philadelphia Wings
- NLL teams: Buffalo Bandits; Philadelphia Wings
- Pro career: 2006–2010

Sean Greenhalgh (born July 15, 1982) is a former professional lacrosse player. Sean is a cousin to Charlie Mulgrew, a Scottish retired footballer.

== Junior career ==
Born in St. Catharines, Ontario, Greenhalgh had a very successful junior career with the St. Catharines Athletics of the OLA Junior A Lacrosse League. In 2000, he was awarded the "Joey Nieuwendyk Award" for Rookie of the Year. The following year, he would win the "Gaylord Powless Sportsmanship Award", and would help lead would lead the Athletics to their first Minto Cup in 10 years.

In 2002, one of the greatest junior teams ever assembled, Greenhalgh and future professionals Craig Conn, Billy Dee Smith, Matt Vinc, Athan Iannucci, Rory Glaves and Mike Hominuck, led the Athletics to an undefeated season and their second league championship in a row. However, the A's would lose the Minto Cup to the Burnaby Lakers.

In Greenhalgh's final season, the Athletics won their third straight league championship and defeated the Burnaby Lakers to win their second Minto Cup in three years.

== High school career ==
Greenhalgh was a five-year starter at Holy Cross Catholic Secondary School, where along with fellow National Lacrosse League players Craig Conn, Matt Vinc, and Billy Dee Smith, won 2 OFSAA championships, and created a dynasty at the school for many more years in the sport.

== College career ==
After high school, Greenhalgh played for Cornell University, where he was named 2005 Ivy League Player of the Year. He is second in career goals scored (136) and fourth in career points (169) at Cornell.

== Professional career ==
=== NLL ===
Greenhalgh was drafted in the first round (3rd overall) of the 2005 NLL entry draft by the Philadelphia Wings. He had an impressive rookie season:

- Led the Wings in goals (31)
- Tied with Dan Marohl for the lead in points (73)
- Won Overall Player of the Week twice, Offensive Player of the Week once, and Rookie of the Week five times
- Named Rookie of the Month for January
- Given the 2006 National Lacrosse League Sportsmanship Award

In July 2007, Greenhalgh was traded to the Buffalo Bandits in a three-team blockbuster trade, but tore a knee ligament before the season began and missed the entire 2008 season (the same season in which the Bandits won the Champion's Cup). Greenhalgh played six games with the Bandits during the 2010 season. He did not play the entire 2011 season and then retired from professional lacrosse.

=== MLL ===
Greenhalgh was selected by the Los Angeles Riptide in the second round (19th overall) in the 2008 MLL Supplemental Draft. He was also named to the Pre-Season Active roster of the Toronto Nationals for their inaugural season in 2009.

== International career ==
Greenhalgh participated in the 2007 World Indoor Lacrosse Championships, representing Scotland (Greenhalgh has dual citizenship through his mother).

== Statistics ==
=== NLL ===
		Regular Season						Playoffs
Season	Team	GP	G	A	Pts	LB	PIM	GP	G	A	Pts	LB	PIM
2006	Philadelphia	16	31	42	73	66	4	--	--	--	--	--	--
2007	Philadelphia	16	26	42	68	100	2	--	--	--	--	--	--
2009	Buffalo	15	15	22	37	51	0	2	2	3	5	7	0
2010	Buffalo	6	3	9	12	13	5	--	--	--	--	--	--
NLL totals		53	75	115	190	230	11	2	2	3	5	7	0

=== OLA ===
			Regular Season					Playoffs
Season	Team	League	GP	G	A	Pts	PIM	GP	G	A	Pts	PIM
1998	Spartan Warriors	OLA Jr.B	2	0	3	3	0	0	0	0	0	0
1999	St. Catharines Athletics	OLA Jr.A	1	0	0	0	0	0	0	0	0	0
2000	St. Catharines Athletics	OLA Jr.A	19	20	17	37	0	15	18	17	35	2
2001	St. Catharines Athletics	OLA Jr.A	18	48	29	77	2	13	22	27	49	12
Minto Cup	St. Catharines Athletics	CLA	--	--	--	--	--	6	6	7	13	0
2002	St. Catharines Athletics	OLA Jr.A	16	28	37	65	2	12	23	21	44	0
Minto Cup	St. Catharines Athletics	CLA	--	--	--	--	--	6	5	10	15	0
2003	St. Catharines Athletics	OLA Jr.A	9	23	16	39	2	7	19	16	35	2
Minto Cup	St. Catharines Athletics	CLA	--	--	--	--	--	6	7	13	20	0
2007	Barrie Lakeshores	MSL	12	15	11	26	0	4	2	3	5	0
2009	Six Nations Chiefs	MSL	10	15	11	26	4	3	0	0	0	0
Junior A Totals			63	119	99	218	6	47	82	81	163	16
Junior B Totals			2	0	3	3	0	0	0	0	0	0
Minto Cup Totals			--	--	--	--	--	18	18	30	48	0
Senior A Totals			22	30	22	52	4	7	2	3	5	0

=== NCAA ===
Season	GP	G	A	Pts	PPG
2002	14	39	3	42	3.00
2003	13	37	9	46	3.54
2004	14	28	6	34	2.42
2005	14	32	14	46	3.29
Totals	55	136	32	168	3.06

== Awards ==
Preceded by Gary Gait	NLL Sportsmanship Award; 2006	Succeeded by Tracy Kelusky
