= Kahnawake Hunters =

- Sport: Box lacrosse
- Founded: 2009
- League: OJBLL
- Based in: Kahnawake, Quebec
- Arena: Kahnawake Sports Complex
- Colours: Maroon, Black, and White
- President: Derek Stacey
- Head coach: Brandon Francis
- General manager: Greg Horn
- Championships: 2025 Founders Cup, 2025 OJBLL Championship, 2025 Eastern Conference Championship 2024 Eastern Conference Championship

The Kahnawake Hunters are a Junior "B" box lacrosse team from Kahnawake, Quebec, Canada. The Hunters play in the Ontario Junior B Lacrosse League and are eligible for the Founders Cup National Championship. The Hunters are the only Quebec team in the OJBLL.

== History ==
The Hunters were proposed by Kahnawake Minor Lacrosse in 2007 as local players had nowhere to play after graduating the minor levels. In 2008, the team operated as an intermediate squad before applying as a Junior B team for the 2009 season.

The Kahnawake Hunters made their debut in 2009 in the Ontario Junior B Lacrosse League. The Hunters expansion marked the first time a Kahnawake team competed in Junior B in almost a decade. In their first season, the Hunters finished with a record of 3 wins, 15 losses, and 2 ties.

== Season-by-season results ==
Note: GP = Games played, W = Wins, L = Losses, T = Ties, Pts = Points, GF = Goals for, GA = Goals against

Season	GP	W	L	T	PTS	GF	GA	Finish	Playoffs
2009	20	3	15	2	8	152	201	4th of 4, Far East	DNQ
2010	20	13	7	0	26	162	132	1st of 4, Far East	Won, 3-0 vs Gloucester Griffins Lost, 1-3 vs Clarington Green Gaels
2011	20	14	6	0	28	249	171	1st of 4, Far East	Lost, 1-3 vs Newmarket Saints
2012	20	10	10	0	20	190	182	2nd of 4, Far East	Lost, 0-3 vs Halton Hills Bulldogs
2013	20	10	10	0	20	208	188	2nd of 4, Far East	Lost, 0-2 vs Halton Hills Bulldogs
2014	20	9	11	0	18	194	201	3rd of 4, Far East	Lost, 0-3 vs Akwesasne Indians
2015	20	5	15	0	10	227	267	4th of 4, Far East	DNQ
2016	20	7	13	0	14	204	224	3rd of 4, Far East	DNQ
2017	20	14	6	0	28	199	179	2nd of 4, Far East	Won, 3-0 vs Gloucester Griffins Lost, 0-3 vs Akwesasne Indians
2018	20	8	12	0	16	229	214	3rd of 4, Far East	Won, 3-0 vs Halton Hills Bulldogs Lost, 0-3 vs Clarington Green Gaels
2019	20	7	13	0	14	185	230	3rd of 4, Far East	Lost, 1-3 vs Nepean Knights

== Alumni ==
- Stone Jacobs (2016-17) - University of Vermont '23
- Koleton Marquis (2018-22) - committed to Johns Hopkins University
- Teioshontathe McComber (2014-19) - Victoria Shamrocks (BCJALL); University of Albany '22
- Brine Rice (2014-16) - 51st pick of the 2016 NLL Draft
