= Jeff Zywicki =

Canadian lacrosse player

Personal information
- Born: April 8, 1981 (age 45) Ottawa, Canada
- Height: 5 ft 10 in (178 cm)
- Weight: 195 lb (88 kg; 13 st 13 lb)

Sport
- Position: Forward
- Shoots: Right
- NLL draft: 8th overall, 2005; San Jose Stealth
- NLL team: Washington Stealth
- MLL team Former teams: Toronto Nationals: San Francisco Dragons; Denver Outlaws
- Pro career: 2006–

Jeff Zywicki (born April 8, 1981) is a Canadian former professional lacrosse player from Ottawa. He played college lacrosse at UMass. He was drafted 8th overall by the San Jose Stealth in the 2005 National Lacrosse League Entry Draft. He also played in Major League Lacrosse for the San Francisco Dragons, Denver Outlaws and the Toronto Nationals, who drafted him.

== Early career ==
Zywicki grew up in Nepean, Ontario, Canada, where he played his minor lacrosse. At 15, he led his Midget lacrosse team to a Provincial championship with his father, Eugene Zywicki as the head coach. At 16, Zywicki began playing for the Nepean Knights of the OLA Junior B Lacrosse League, where he finished second with 5.0 points per game to Andre Leduc (5.4 points per game) for most career points per game. In 1998, Zywicki had a career high 96 points and was awarded as the League's Most Outstanding Rookie. During his time with the Knights, Zywicki also split time playing with the Jr. ‘A’ Orillia Rama Kings.

== College & professional career ==
Zywicki attended the University of Massachusetts Amherst where he was awarded ECAC Lacrosse League First Team honors as a senior.

That same year, Jeff was drafted 8th overall by the San Jose Stealth in the National Lacrosse League entry draft. He also plays for the Toronto Nationals of Major League Lacrosse. During the 2009 NLL season, he was named a reserve to the All-Star game.

== International career ==
In 2006, Jeff lead the Canadian Men's lacrosse team to its first World Lacrosse Championship since 1978, when it defeated the U.S. 15–10 in the final of the 2006 World Lacrosse Championship. Jeff had an outstanding championship, being awarded the 'Best Attackman' and earning a spot on the All-World team after scoring a tournament record 28 goals in 8 games.

== Statistics ==
=== NCAA ===
Season	GP	G	A	Pts	PPG
2001	7	1	2	3	--
2002	16	16	11	27	2.41
2003	16	41	21	62	3.50
2004	1	1	0	1	--
2005	16	44	9	53	3.18
Totals	55	103	43	146	2.79

=== NLL ===
		Regular Season						Playoffs
Season	Team	GP	G	A	Pts	LB	PIM	GP	G	A	Pts	LB	PIM
2006	San Jose	16	27	21	48	77	8	--	--	--	--	--	--
2007	San Jose	14	40	30	70	107	2	2	8	2	10	14	4
2008	San Jose	16	48	42	90	105	4	1	4	3	7	3	0
2009	San Jose	16	32	46	78	83	33	2	5	5	10	17	0
NLL totals		62	147	139	286	372	47	5	17	10	27	34	4

=== MLL ===
		Regular Season							Playoffs
Season	Team	GP	G	2ptG	A	Pts	GB	PIM	GP	G	2ptG	A	Pts	GB	PIM
2006	San Francisco	1	0	0	2	2	1	0	--	--	--	--	--	--	--
2006	Denver	4	6	0	3	9	4	0	2	5	0	1	6	1	0
2007	Rochester	12	31	0	17	48	23	0	1	1	0	0	1	3	0
2008	Rochester	11	31	0	14	45	26	0.5	2	7	0	1	8	5	1
2009	Toronto	10	19	0	14	33	14	2.5	2	4	0	1	5	3	0
MLL Totals		28	68	0	36	104	54	0.5	5	13	0	2	15	9	1

=== Junior ===
			Regular Season					Playoffs
Season	Team	League	GP	G	A	Pts	PIM	GP	G	A	Pts	PIM
1997	Nepean Knights	OLA Jr.B	3	3	1	4	0	5	10	11	21	2
1998	Nepean Knights	OLA Jr.B	16	57	39	96	8	8	13	10	23	20
1998	Orillia Rama Kings	OLA Jr.A	8	10	11	21	2	0	0	0	0	0
1999	Nepean Knights	OLA Jr.B	12	41	30	71	20	5	17	16	33	0
1999	Orillia Rama Kings	OLA Jr.A	9	22	18	40	0	0	0	0	0	0
2000	Nepan Knights	OLA Jr.B	12	29	32	61	55	7	19	19	38	8
2000	Orillia Rama Kings	OLA Jr.A	16	23	27	50	10	--	--	--	--	--
2001	Nepean Knights	OLA Jr.B	1	3	0	3	0	--	--	--	--	--
2001	Orillia Rama Kings	OLA Jr.A	16	18	21	39	8	6	10	9	19	9
2002	Orillia Rama Kings	OLA Jr.A	17	48	23	71	10	7	17	12	29	4
Junior A Totals			66	121	100	221	30	23	27	21	48	13
Junior B Totals			44	133	102	235	83	25	59	56	115	30

=== Senior ===
			Regular Season					Playoffs
Season	Team	League	GP	G	A	Pts	PIM	GP	G	A	Pts	PIM
2001	Akwesasne Thunder	MSL	1	0	2	2	0	--	--	--	--	--
2005	Brooklin Redmen	MSL	15	21	27	48	0	--	--	--	--	--
2006	Brooklin Redmen	MSL	5	9	3	12	0	6	9	17	26	0
2007	Brooklin Redmen	MSL	11	19	24	43	2	--	--	--	--	--
Senior A Totals			32	49	56	105	2	6	9	17	26	0
