= Point Edward Pacers =

Canadian box lacrosse team

- Sport: Box lacrosse
- Founded: 1973
- League: Ontario Junior B Lacrosse League
- Based in: Point Edward, Ontario
- Arena: Point Edward Arena
- Colours: Orange, Black, and White
- Head coach: Matt Vince
- General manager: Steve Baker
- History: Point Edward Easy Movers 1973–1975; Point Edward Pacers 1976–1984; Sarnia Pacers 1984–2012; Point Edward Pacers 2013–present

The Point Edward Pacers a are Junior "B" box lacrosse team from Point Edward, Ontario, Canada. The Pacers play in the Ontario Junior B Lacrosse League. The Pacers are four-time Founders Cup Canadian Junior B champions.

== History ==
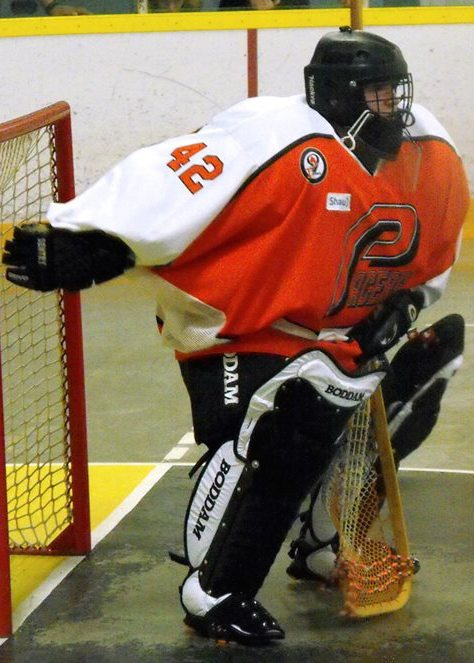
Reece Landeryou 2014.

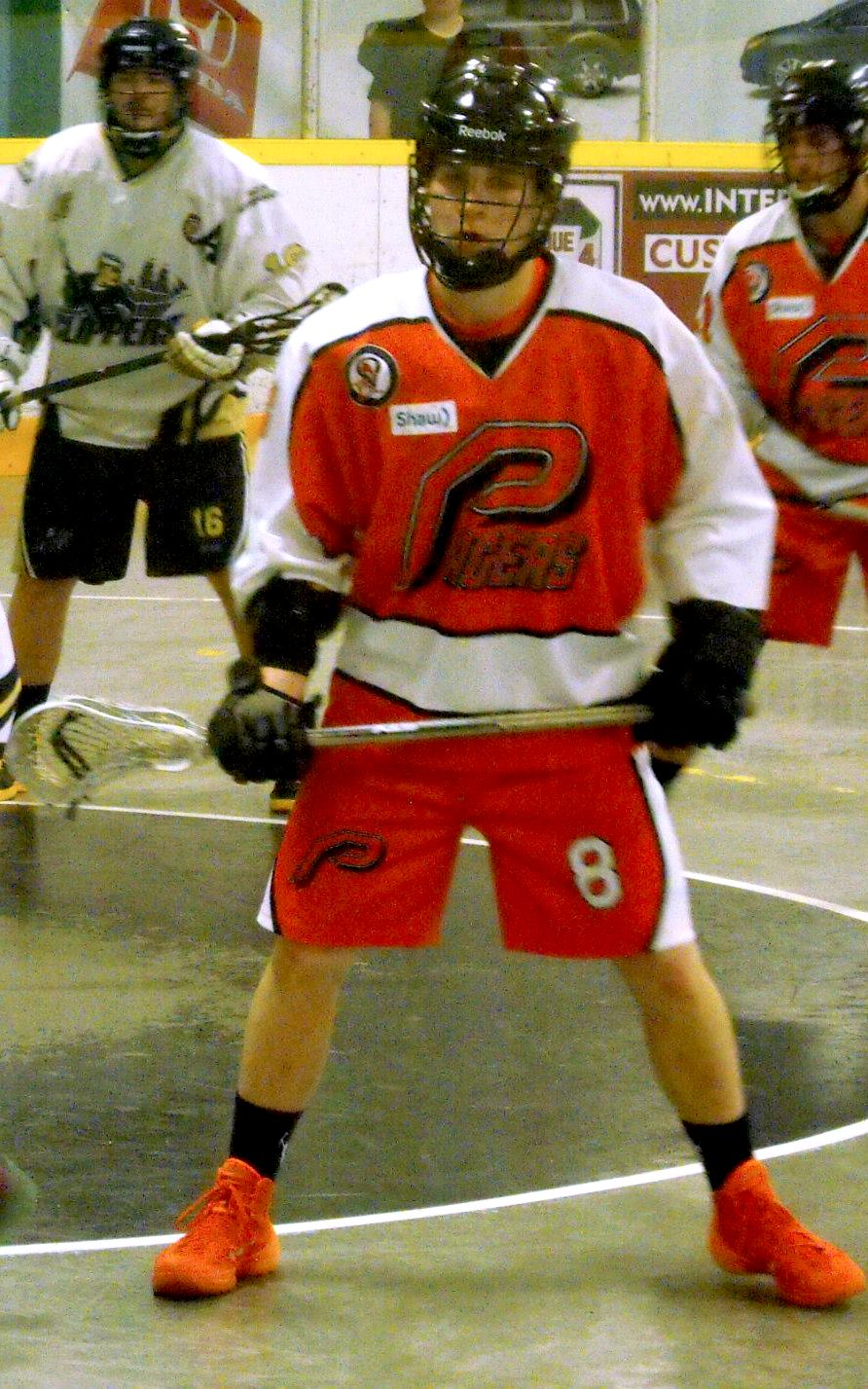
Current head coach.

The Point Edward Pacers were founded in 1973 as members of the OLA's Junior C League. After three seasons, including the last two making the division final, the Pacers were promoted to the Ontario Junior B Lacrosse League.

Despite starting off with a losing season and not making the playoffs, the Pacers went 19–1 in 1977 and lost in the league final. The next two years, the Pacers won both the OJBLL playoffs and the Founders Cup as Canadian Junior B champions. The Pacers repeated this in the 1983 and 1984 season.

In 1989, the Pacers, now based out of Sarnia, Ontario, were promoted to the Ontario Junior A Lacrosse League. The Pacers stayed in Junior A until 1998, but struggled. The Pacers never made it past the league semi-final and in the 1998 season went winless with a 0–22 record.

The Pacers returned to the OJBLL in 1999, putting up winning seasons in five of their first six years back in the league. From 2005 until 2013, the Pacers fell off and did not make the playoffs. In 2013, the Pacers returned to Point Edward.

== Season-by-season results ==
Note: GP = Games played, W = Wins, L = Losses, T = Ties, Pts = Points, GF = Goals for, GA = Goals against

Season	GP	W	L	T	GF	GA	PTS	Placing	Playoffs
Point Edward Jr. C Easy Movers
1973	20	5	15	0	237	290	10	3rd OLA-C Div A	DNQ
1974	24	15	9	0	361	334	30	2nd OLA-C West	Lost division final
1975	22	13	9	0	341	320	26	2nd OLA-C West	Lost division final, lost League Final
3 Seasons	66	33	33	0	939	944	66	Best: 2nd West (Twice)	Best: Lost final (1975)
Point Edward Jr. B Pacers
1976	24	10	14	0	394	358	20	5th OLA-B West	DNQ
1977	20	19	1	0	434	191	38	1st OLA-B West	Lost final
1978	22	20	2	0	464	245	40	1st OLA-B West	Won League, won Founders Cup
1979	22	15	7	0	416	338	30	2nd OLA-B West	Won League, won Founders Cup
1980	16	12	4	0	342	174	24	2nd OLA-B West	Lost quarter-final
1981	20	17	3	0	422	256	34	2nd OLA-B West	Lost semi-final
1982	24	19	5	0	474	358	38	2nd OLA-B West	Lost semi-final
1983	20	19	1	0	502	278	38	1st OLA-B West	Won League, won Founders Cup
1984	20	18	2	0	450	233	36	1st OLA-B Div I	Won League, won Founders Cup
9 Seasons	188	149	39	0	3898	2431	298	Best: 1st West (4 Times)	Best: Won Founders Cup (4 Times)
Sarnia Jr. B Pacers
1985	24	15	9	0	414	324	30	2nd OLA-B West	Lost semi-final
1986	20	17	3	0	404	210	34	2nd OLA-B West	Lost final
1987	24	17	6	1	333	241	35	2nd OLA-B West	Lost semi-final
1988	20	12	8	0	279	216	24	3rd OLA-B West	Lost quarter-final
4 Seasons	88	61	26	1	1430	991	123	Best: 2nd West (Thrice)	Best: Lost final (1986)
Sarnia Jr. A Pacers
1989	24	7	17	0	248	347	14	5th OLA-A	DNQ
1990	20	10	10	0	219	268	20	5th OLA-A	Lost semi-final
1991	20	11	9	0	230	201	22	5th OLA-A	Lost semi-final
1992	20	10	9	1	216	208	21	5th OLA-A	Lost quarter-final
1993	22	3	18	1	196	361	7	10th OLA-A	DNQ
1994	26	2	24	0	190	409	4	6th OLA-A West	DNQ
1995	20	3	17	0	175	300	6	10th OLA-A	DNQ
1996	20	4	16	0	177	255	8	10th OLA-A	DNQ
1997	18	4	14	0	188	261	8	9th OLA-A	DNQ
1998	22	0	22	0	176	386	0	12th OLA-A	DNQ
10 Seasons	212	54	156	2	2015	2996	110	Best: 5th (4 Times)	Best: Lost semi-final (Twice)
Sarnia Jr. B Pacers
1999	21	13	8	0	270	219	26	4th OLA-B West	Lost quarter-final
2000	21	15	6	0	243	191	30	2nd OLA-B West	Lost semi-final
2001	20	8	11	1	174	199	17	7th OLA-B West	DNQ
2002	22	13	7	2	274	207	28	5th OLA-B West	Lost quarter-final
2003	20	16	4	0	236	160	32	4th OLA-B West	Lost 1st round
2004	20	16	4	0	236	160	32	3rd OLA-B West	Lost 1st round
2005	20	5	15	0	164	203	10	9th OLA-B West	DNQ
2006	20	3	17	0	133	255	6	12th OLA-B West	DNQ
2007	20	2	18	0	121	248	4	12th OLA-B West	DNQ
2008	20	5	14	1	138	178	11	11th OLA-B West	DNQ
2009	20	5	14	1	115	186	11	11th OLA-B West	DNQ
2010	20	5	14	1	137	182	11	11th OLA-B West	DNQ
2011	20	7	13	0	167	246	14	9th OLA-B West	DNQ
2012	20	6	14	0	185	246	12	10th OLA-B West	DNQ
14 Seasons	284	119	159	6	2593	2880	244	Best: 2nd West (2000)	Best: Lost Conference Final (2000)
Point Edward Jr. B Pacers
2013	20	5	15	0	207	283	10	12th OLA-B West	DNQ
2014	20	2	18	0	151	308	4	12th OLA-B West	DNQ
2015	20	4	15	1	149	203	9	10th OLA-B West	DNQ
2016	20	8	12	0	143	201	16	10th OLA-B West	DNQ
2017	20	9	11	0	189	212	18	8th OLA-B West	Lost 1st round
2018	20	3	17	0	138	260	6	11th OLA-B West	DNQ
2019	20	5	15	0	171	284	10	10th OLA-B West	DNQ
2022	20	6	14	0	148	258	12	8th OLA-B West	Lost 1st round
2023	20	0	20	0	108	326	0	12th OLA-B West	DNQ

== Playoff results ==
Season	Opponent	Series	GF–GA	Result	Round
1999	Owen Sound Flying Dutchmen	3-0	45-26	Win	Conference QF
--	Elora Mohawks	1-3	37-60	Loss	Conference SF
2000	St. Catharines Spartans	4-3	77-60	Win	Division SF
--	Elora Mohawks	3-4	66-102	Loss	Division Final
2002	Six Nations Rebels	3-0	31-25	Win	Conference QF
--	St. Catharines Spartans	2-3	32-56	Loss	Conference SF
2003	Owen Sound Flying Dutchmen	1-3	42-35	Loss	Conference QF
2004	Orangeville Northmen	1-3	33-35	Loss	Conference QF
2017	Six Nations Rebels	0-3	18-56	Loss	Conference QF
2022	Elora Mohawks	0-3	6-55	Loss	Conference QF
