= Brampton Excelsiors Jr. B =

Brampton Excelsiors
- Sport: Box lacrosse
- Founded: 2012
- League: Ontario Junior B Lacrosse League
- Based in: Brampton, Ontario
- Arena: Brampton Memorial
- Colours: Maroon, Yellow, and White
- Head coach: Todd Wilfong
- General manager: Brent McCauley
- Championships: Founders Cup wins: None; Ontario Titles: None

The Brampton Excelsiors are a Junior "B" box lacrosse team from Brampton, Ontario, Canada. The Excelsiors play in the OLA Junior B Lacrosse League and are eligible to compete for the Founders Cup National Championship. The Excelsiors are members of the same system of teams as the Major Excelsiors and the Junior A Excelsiors.

== History ==
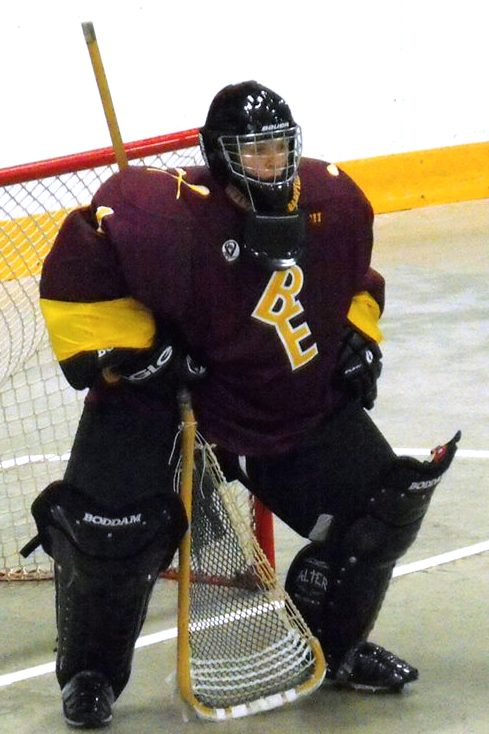
Brampton Excelsiors goalie in 2014

Announced October 16, 2011, the Excelsiors were admitted as an expansion team into the OJBLL for the 2012 season.

On April 22, 2012, the Jr. B Excelsiors played their first game, at home, with an 11–6 win over the Hamilton Bengals. The Excelsiors finished the season with a 4-16 record and did not make the playoffs.

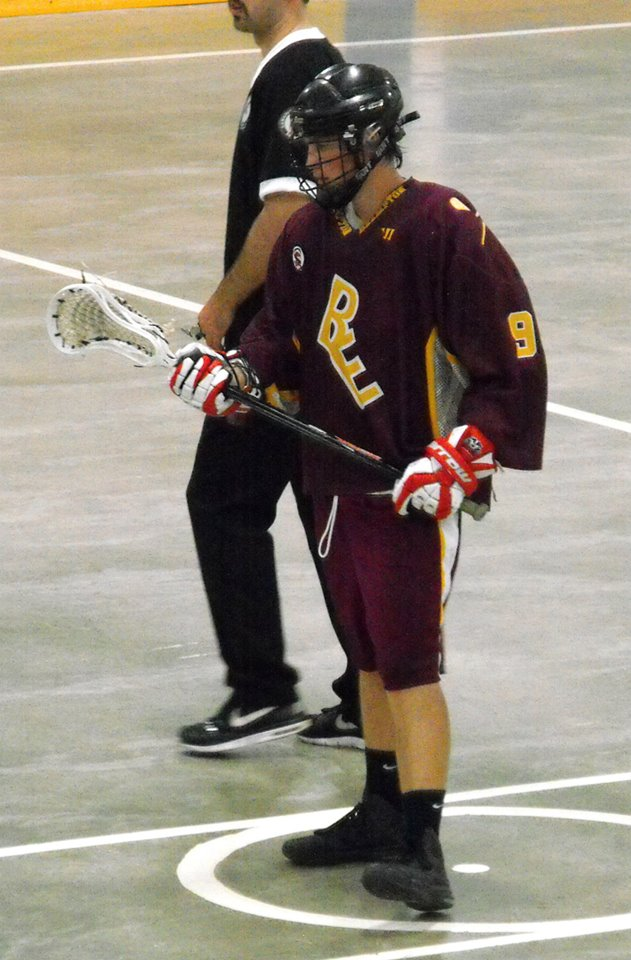
Brampton Excelsiors player in 2014

In their second season, the Excelsiors finished 10–10 and received the final playoff spot in their conference. In the conference quarter-final, they drew the undefeated, two-time defending national champion Six Nations Rebels. The Rebels won 15–5 and 17–5 to finish the Excelsiors' season and first playoff berth.

The 2014 season was filled with a summer-long battle against the Welland Generals and Owen Sound North Stars for the final playoff spot in the West. Even though the final rankings were not determined until the final weekend of the season, the Generals topped both Owen Sound and Brampton for the final spot.

In the 2015 season, the Brampton Excelsiors were moved from the West division to the East division because Mimico's Jr B was folded and became a Jr A team after moving from Mississauga.

== Season-by-season results ==
Note: GP = Games played, W = Wins, L = Losses, T = Ties, Pts = Points, GF = Goals for, GA = Goals against

Season	GP	W	L	T	GF	GA	PTS	Placing	Playoffs
2012	20	4	16	0	190	269	8	13th OJBLL West	DNQ
2013	20	10	10	0	233	225	20	8th OJBLL West	Lost Conference QF
2014	20	6	13	1	179	227	13	10th OJBLL West	DNQ
2015	20	8	11	1	205	209	17	9th OJBLL East	DNQ
2016	20	7	13	0	185	237	14	8th OJBLL East	Lost Conference QF
2017	20	8	11	1	187	198	17	9th OJBLL East	DNQ

=== Playoff results ===
Season	Opponent	Series	GF–GA	Result	Round
2013	Six Nations Rebels	0-2	10-32	Loss	Conference QF
2016	Green Gaels	0-3	09-54	Loss	Conference QF
