= Founders Cup =

Lacrosse championship trophy

Founders Cup Trophy

2006 Founders Cup Logo

The Founders' Cup is the championship trophy of Canada's Junior "B" lacrosse leagues. The custodial duties of this trophy fall upon the Lacrosse Canada (LC). The national champions are determined through a round robin format with a play-down for the final.

== History ==
The original Founders Cup was inaugurated in 1972 by the CLA in honour of "the founders of organized lacrosse," especially "The Father of Organized Lacrosse", William George Beers of Montreal, Quebec. Dr. Beers wrote the first rulebook of the sport and was key to the organizing the National Lacrosse Association in 1867, the forerunner of the CLA.

== Competitive leagues ==
- Alberta - Rocky Mountain Lacrosse League
- British Columbia - Pacific Northwest Junior Lacrosse League, Thompson Okanagan Junior Lacrosse League, West Coast Junior Lacrosse League
- First Nations - First Nations Junior B Lacrosse League
- Manitoba - Rocky Mountain Lacrosse League
- New Brunswick - East Coast Junior Lacrosse League
- Nova Scotia - East Coast Junior Lacrosse League
- Ontario - Ontario Junior B Lacrosse League
- Quebec - Fédération de crosse du Québec, Ontario Junior C Lacrosse League
- Saskatchewan - Prairie Gold Lacrosse League, Rocky Mountain Lacrosse League

== Founders' Cup Champions ==
Year	Champion	Finalist	Third	Host
Castrol Cup era
1964	Guelph Mohawks (ON)	Cornwall Wildcats(ON)		Best 2 of 3
1965	Huntsville Teen Towners (ON)	Ottawa (ON)		Best 3 of 5
1966	New Westminster Athletics (BC)	Cornwall Wildcats(ON)		Port Arthur(ON)
1967	Elora Mohawks (ON)	Cornwall Wildcats(ON)		Best 2 of 3
1968	Elora Mohawks (ON)	Winnipeg Northstars(MB)	Morrisburg Mets(ON)	Winnipeg(MB)
1969	Vancouver Grandview (BC)	Rexdale Warriors(ON)		Halifax(NS)- Canada Summer Games
1970	Whitby B&R Transporters (ON)	Vancouver Grandview Legion(BC)		Whitby(ON)
1971	Victoria McDonalds Bread Co. (BC)	Cornwall Wildcats(ON)		Cornwall(ON)
Founders Cup era
1972	Long Branch PCO's* (ON)	Calgary Shamrocks(AB)		Long Branch(ON)
1973	NOTL Warriors (ON)	Halifax/Dartmouth(NS)		Burnaby/New Westminster(BC)Canada Summer Games
1974	Whitby B&R Transporters (ON)	Esquimalt Teamsters(BC)		Whitby(ON)
1975	Windsor Warlocks (ON)	Esquimalt (BC)	North Glenora Blues (AB)	Edmonton, AB
1976	Elora Mohawks(ON)	Burnaby Cablevision (BC)	Windsor Warlocks (ON)	Windsor, ON
1977	Scarborough Saints(ON)	(QC)		St.John's(NL) Canada Summer Games
1978	Point Edward Pacers (ON)	(BC)	(QC)	Montreal(QC)
1979	Point Edward Pacers (ON)	(BC)		Point Edward(ON)
1980	Enoch Tomahawks (AB)	Toronto Beaches (ON)	Owen Sound Signmen (ON)	Baie-Comeau, QC
1981	NOTL Warriors (ON)
1982	Owen Sound Signmen (ON)	Delta Islanders(BC)	POCO Saints(BC)	Port Coquitlam, BC
1983	Point Edward Pacers (ON)	Enoch Tomahawks(AB)		Calgary(AB)
1984	Point Edward Pacers (ON)	Scarborough Saints (ON)		Huntsville, ON
1985	Scarborough Saints (ON)	Laval Nations(QC)		Scarborough(ON)
1986	Mississauga Tomahawks (ON)	Alberta (AB)	Akwesasne Eagles	Dartmouth, NS
1987	Kitchener-Waterloo Braves (ON)	Mississauga Tomahawks (ON)	Huntsville Hawks (ON)	Kitchener, ON
1988	Kitchener-Waterloo Braves (ON)	Peterbourgh Stags(ON)		Sarnia, ON
1989	Orangeville Northmen (ON)	Kitchener-Waterloo Braves(ON)		Gloucester (QC)
1990	Orangeville Northmen (ON)	Port Coquitlam Saints (BC)	Esquimalt Legion	Esquimalt, BC

(*) denotes in 1972, the Founders Cup was awarded to the Junior "C" Champion instead of the Junior "B" Champion.

Year	Gold Medal Game			Bronze Medal Game		
Year	Champions	Score	Finalists	Third Place	Score	Fourth Place
1991	Huntsville Hawks; OJBLL	18-6	Gloucester Griffins OJBLL-Host	Delta Islanders (BC)		
1992; Scarborough, ON	Scarborough Saints; OJBLL - Host	9-5	Orillia Kings; OJBLL			
1993; Winnipeg, MB	Owen Sound Flying Dutchmen; OJBLL	15-13	Orillia Kings; OJBLL			
1994 Orillia, Ontario	Orillia Kings; OJBLL					
1995; St. Catharines, ON	Orillia Kings; OJBLL					
1996	Spartan Warriors; OJBLL		Orillia Kings; OJBLL	Edmonton Miners (AB)-Host		
1997; Etobicoke, ON	Six Nations Red Rebels; OJBLL	11-9 OT	Orillia Kings; OJBLL	Iroquois Nationals; ILA	11-4	Mimico Mountaineers; OJBLL - Host
1998; Akwesasne	Clarington Green Gaels; OJBLL	13-6	Iroquois Nationals; ILA - Host	Six Nations Red Rebels; OJBLL	12-10	Edmonton Miners; RMLL
1999; Milton, ON	Edmonton Miners; RMLL	13-10	Milton Mavericks; OJBLL - Host	Clarington Green Gaels; OJBLL	10-8	Elora Mohawks; OJBLL
2000; Clarington, ON	Clarington Green Gaels; OJBLL - Host	8-6	Iroquois Nationals; ILA	Elora Mohawks; OJBLL	18-1	Calgary Mountaineers; RMLL
2001; Edmonton, AB	Wallaceburg Red Devils; OJBLL	10-5	Edmonton Miners; RMLL - Host	Scarborough Saints; OJBLL	11-10 OT	Delta Islanders; WCJLL
2002; Georgetown, ON	Clarington Green Gaels; OJBLL	7-6	St. Catharines Spartans; OJBLL	Edmonton Miners; RMLL	9-7 OT	Halton Hills Bulldogs; OJBLL - Host
2003; Port Coquitlam, BC	Barrie Tornado; OJBLL	16-8	Coquitlam Adanacs; WCJLL	Prince George Posse; TOJLL	13-11 OT	Port Coquitlam Saints; WCJLL - Host
2004; Elora, ON	Clarington Green Gaels; OJBLL	11-8	Elora Mohawks; OJBLL - Host	Edmonton Warriors; RMLL	15-9	Manitoba Buffalo; RMLL
2005; Saskatoon, SK	Elora Mohawks; OJBLL	11-2	Edmonton Warriors; RMLL	Kamloops Rattlers; TOJLL	6-4	Calgary Shamrocks; RMLL
2006; Windsor, ON	Oakville Buzz; OJBLL	10-4	Windsor AKO Fratmen; OJBLL - Host	Calgary Shamrocks; RMLL	14-4	Iroquois Nationals; ILA
2007; Kamloops, BC	Six Nations Rebels; OJBLL	8-2	Coquitlam Adanacs; WCJLL	Calgary Shamrocks; RMLL	6-5	Calgary Mountaineers; RMLL
2008; Guelph, ON	Six Nations Rebels; OJBLL	8-7	Guelph Regals; OJBLL - Host	Iroquois Nationals; FNLA	5-3	Port Coquitlam Saints; WCJLL
2009; Edmonton, AB	Calgary Mountaineers; RMLL	8-4	Clarington Green Gaels; OJBLL	Edmonton Warriors; RMLL - Host	7-6	Red Deer Rampage; RMLL
2010; Etobicoke, ON	Halton Hills Bulldogs; OJBLL	4-3 2OT	Mimico Mountaineers; OJBLL - Host	Kamloops Venom; TOJLL	8-3	Calgary Mountaineers; RMLL
2011; Saskatoon, SK	Six Nations Rebels; OJBLL	14-11	Calgary Mountaineers; RMLL	Saskatchewan SWAT; PGLL - Host	15-7	Manitoba Gryphons; RMLL
2012; Hagersville, ON	Six Nations Rebels; OJBLL - Host	8-7	Akwesasne Indians; OJBLL	Calgary Mountaineers; RMLL	17-11	Onondaga Redhawks; ILA
2013; Winnipeg, MB	Six Nations Rebels; OJBLL	16-12	Calgary Mountaineers; RMLL	Onondaga Redhawks; ILA	14-9	Team Nova Scotia
2014; Halifax, NS	Six Nations Rebels; OJBLL	14-7	Seneca WarChiefs; INJBLL	Team Nova Scotia; Host	11-4	Manitoba Blizzard; RMLL
2015; Calgary, AB	Akwesasne Indians; OJBLL	9-6 OT	Seneca WarChiefs; FNJBLL	Calgary Mountaineers; RMLL - Host	9-6	Coquitlam Adanacs; WCJLL
2016; Orangeville, ON	Orangeville Northmen; OJBLL - Host	11-6	Clarington Green Gaels; OJBLL	Seneca WarChiefs; FNJBLL	17-8	Calgary Chill; RMLL
2017; Saskatoon, SK	Orangeville Northmen; OJBLL	18-7	Red Deer Rampage; RMLL	Seneca WarChiefs; FNJBLL	15-8	Manitoba Blizzard; RMLL
2018; Akwesasne	Elora Mohawks; OJBLL	9-5	Seneca WarChiefs; FNJBLL	Coquitlam Adanacs; BCJT1LL	9-8	Manitoba Blizzard; RMLL
2019; Winnipeg, MB	Calgary Shamrocks; RMLL	16-15	Six Nations Rebels; OJBLL	Coquitlam Adanacs; BCJT1LL	7-4	Manitoba Blizzard; RMLL - Host
2022; Brampton, ON	Nepean Knights; OJBLL	7-6	Coquitlam Adanacs; BCJT1LL	Edmonton Warriors; RMLL	12-11	Brampton Excelsiors; OBJLL - Host
2023; Port Coquitlam, BC	Edmonton Warriors; RMLL	9-7	Akwesasne Thunder; OJBLL	Port Coquitlam Saints; BCJT1LL - Host	12-8	Onondaga Redhawks; FNJBLL
2024; Hamilton, ON	Elora Mohawks; OJBLL	10-1	Hamilton Bengals; OJBLL - Host	Onondaga Redhawks; FNJBLL	11-3	Victoria Shamrocks; BCJT1LL
2025; Calgary, AB	Kahnawake Hunters; OJBLL	9-4	Coquitlam Adanacs; BCJT1LL	Calgary Shamrocks; RMLL - Host	9-7	Mountainview Mavericks; RMLL
2026; St. John, NB	Akwesasne Thunder; OJBLL	11-4	Seneca WarChiefs; FNJBLL	Mountainview Mavericks; RMLL	8-7	Port Coquitlam Saints; BCJBT1
