= Ontario Junior B Lacrosse League =

Lacrosse league in Canada

- OJBLL
- Sport: Box lacrosse
- Founded: 1965
- Commissioner: Dave Vernon
- No. of teams: 24
- Country: Canada
- Most recent champion: Kahnawake Hunters (2025)

The Ontario Junior B Lacrosse League (OJBLL) is a box lacrosse league sanctioned by the Ontario Lacrosse Association in Canada. The league features twenty-five teams in Ontario, one in Quebec, and one in the Akwesasne (which straddles the two aforementioned provinces and New York) that annually play a 20-game schedule and four rounds of playoffs for the J. A. MacDonald Trophy. After the conclusion of the playoffs, a league champion represents the OJBLL at the Founders Cup National Junior B Championship.

== History ==
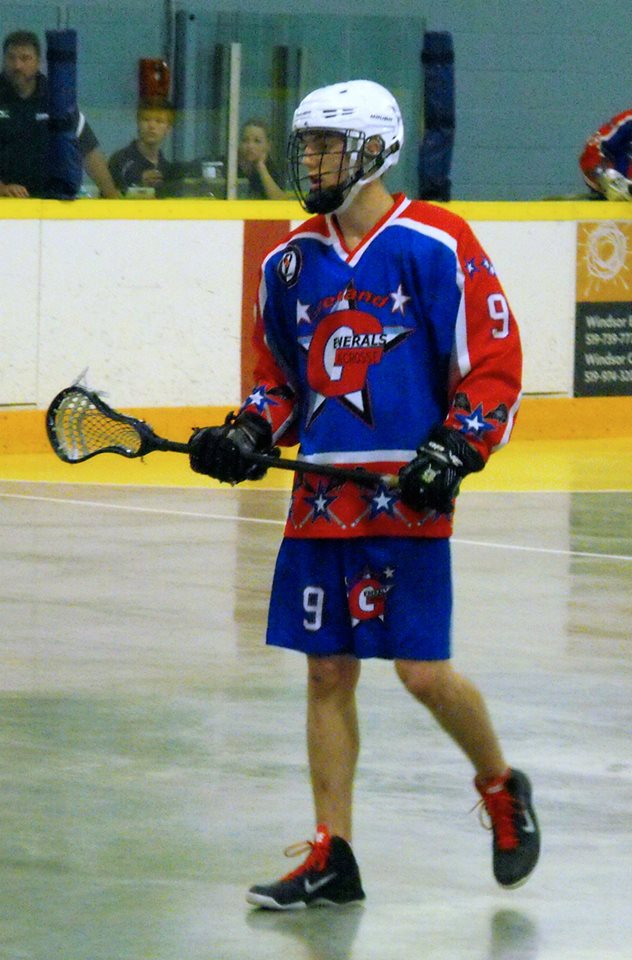
Welland Generals player 2014.

The Ontario Junior B Lacrosse League of the Ontario Lacrosse Association has been around since at least 1965. The OJBLL compete for the J. A. MacDonald Trophy annually at the provincial level. At the national level, the OJBLL has been extremely dominant at the Founders Cup tournament only losing out to other leagues a handful of times in the last 40+ years.

Players from the OJBLL and the Ontario Junior A Lacrosse League are often drafted straight into the professional levels of lacrosse, the National Lacrosse League and Canadian Lacrosse League.

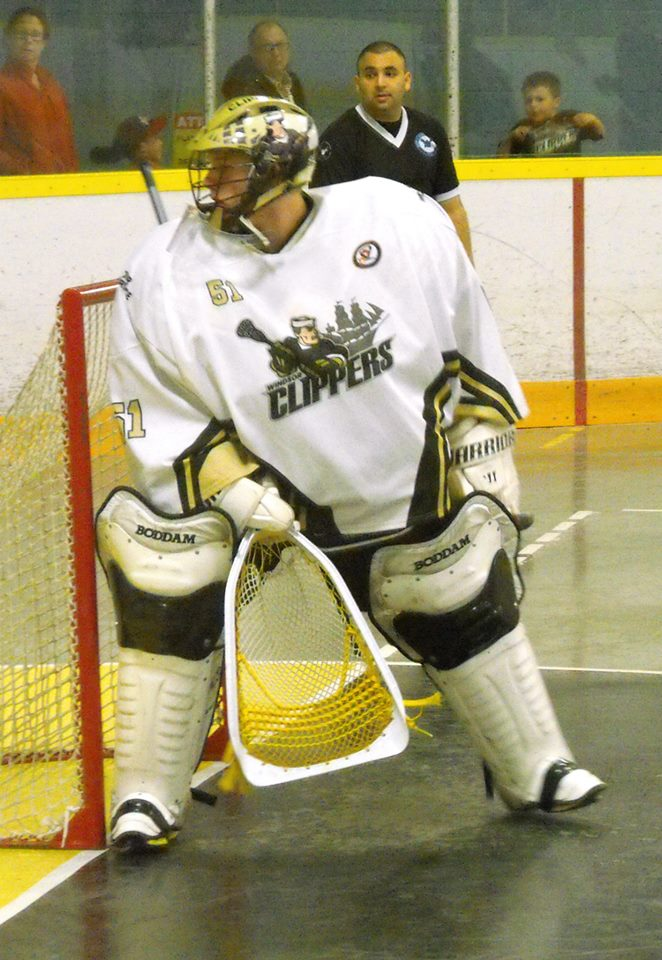
Windsor Clippers goalie Cooper Cecile 2014.

The league has changed formats few times in the last few decades. The league has played with no divisions (1990) and with as many as seven (2005). In the past few years, the league has expanded to Oakville, Windsor, London, Cornwall, Hamilton, Niagara, Markham, Orangeville, and Welland. Also, for the 2007 season, the City of Caledon applied to resurrect its old Caledon Bandits franchise, but was offered a spot in the new OLA Junior C Lacrosse League in 2008. Kahnawake Hunters joined the OLA Junior B League in 2009 after not fielding a team in the OLA or Iroquois League for five years. In 2012, the Brampton Excelsiors joined the OJBLL.

Clarington Green Gaels had a run between 1998 and 2004 when the Gaels won four Founders Cups Canadian Junior B titles and two J. A. MacDonald Trophy championships. Of the more recent expansion of the league, the Oakville Buzz have been the most remarkable franchise to be built. In 2006, the Buzz team went 19-1 and strolled through the playoffs with little opposition. The Buzz went undefeated at the Founders Cup and crushed the hopes of the host Windsor AKO Fratmen, beating them by a score of 10–4 in the final. Oakville made the jump to Junior A for the 2019 season.

Six Nations Rebels dominated the league from 2007 through 2014, winning five league championships (2007, 2008, 2011, 2012, 2013) and six Founders Cups (2007, 2008, 2011, 2012, 2013, and 2014).

Orangeville continued the league success at Founders Cup winning back-to-back titles in 2016 and 2017. Elora Mohawks kept the OJBLL streak alive when they captured gold at the 2018 national championship. It would mark the sixth gold medal in the history of the Mohawks.

== Teams ==
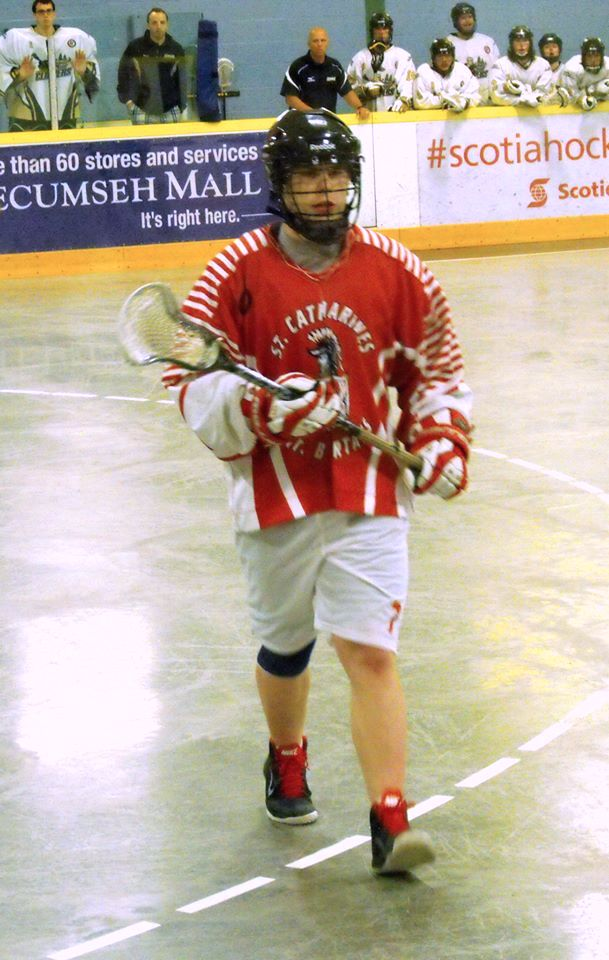
St. Catharines Spartans player in 2014.

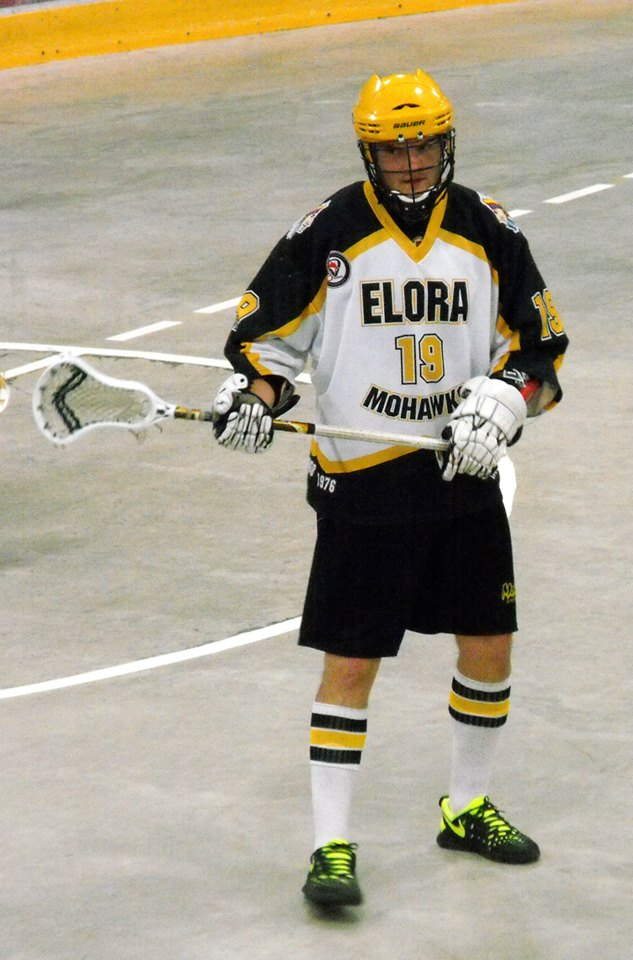
Elora Mohawks player in 2014.

Eastern Conference
Team	Joined	Centre
Akwesasne Indians	1996	Akwesasne
Brampton Excelsiors	2012	Brampton
Clarington Green Gaels	1995	Clarington
Gloucester Griffins	1990	Gloucester
Halton Hills Bulldogs	1992	Georgetown
Kahnawake Hunters	2009	Kahnawake
Mimico Mountaineers	2019	Mimico
Nepean Knights	1993	Nepean
Redbirds	1979	Newmarket
Orangeville Northmen	2001	Orangeville
Orillia Kings	2009	Orillia
West Durham Ironheads	2002	Ajax
Western Conference
Team	Joined	Centre
Cambridge Highlanders	2023	Cambridge
Elora Mohawks	1987	Elora
Guelph Regals	1992	Guelph
Hamilton Bengals	2006	Hamilton
London Blue Devils	2003	London
Owen Sound North Stars	1980	Owen Sound
Point Edward Pacers	1999	Sarnia
Six Nations Rebels	1996	Hagersville
St. Catharines Athletics	2022	St. Catharines
Wallaceburg Red Devils	1998	Wallaceburg
Welland Generals	2001	Welland
Windsor Clippers	2003	Windsor

== Champions ==
Overall champions are bolded. In three-division years, the italics denote finals runner-up. Champion moves on to the Founders Cup national championship.

**Year**	**Champion**	**Finalist**	**Series**	**Scores**
1965	**Huntsville Teen Towners**	Whitby Steelers	4-1	**8-6**, **11-7**, **21-12**, 9–10, **14-8**
1966	**Toronto Township Combines**	Oshawa Steelers	4-2
1967	**Elora Mohawks**	Dixie Combines	4-0
1968	**Elora Mohawks**	Oshawa Steelers	4-1	**16-8**, **13-9**, **14-10**, 15–17, **15-11**

**Year**	**West**	**Central**	**East**	**Series**	**Scores**
1969	Mississauga PCO's
1970	Niagara Warriors	Rexdale Warriors	**Whitby B&R Trans**	CC*
1971	Hamilton Bengals	**Rexdale Warriors**	Cornwall Celtics	3-1
1972	Hamilton Bengals	**Whitby B&R Trans**	Cornwall Celtics	3-1

**Year**	**West**	**East**	**Series**	**Scores**
1973	**Niagara Warriors**	Whitby B&R Transporters	4-1
1974	Kitchener-Waterloo Braves	**Whitby B&R Transporters**	FC*
1975	**Windsor Warlocks**	Mississauga Sullivan Homes	3-0

**Year**	**West**	**Central**	**East**	**Series**	**Scores**
1976	**Elora Mohawks**	Ennismore TWS	Nepean Timbermen	3-1

**Year**	**West**	**East**	**Series**	**Scores**
1977	Point Edward Pacers	**Scarborough Saints**	2-4
1978	**Point Edward Pacers**	St. Regis Mohawks	2-1
1979	**Point Edward Pacers**

**Year**	**West**	**Central**	**East**	**Series**	**Scores**
1980	Six Nations Arrows	**Owen Sound Signmen**	Toronto Beaches	4-3

**Year**	**West**	**East**	**Series**	**Scores**
1981	**Niagara Spartan Warriors**	Toronto Beaches	4-2
1982	**Owen Sound Signmen**	Toronto Beaches	4-2
1983	**Point Edward Pacers**	Toronto Beaches	4-0
1984	**Point Edward Pacers**	Mississauga Arrowheads	4-1
1985	Mississauga Tomahawks	**Scarborough Saints**	0-4
1986	Sarnia Pacers	**Mississauga Tomahawks**	3-4
1987	**Mississauga Tomahawks**	Huntsville Hawks	4-0
1988	**Kitchener-Waterloo Braves**	Peterborough Stags	4-0

**Year**	**Champion**	**Finalist**	**Series**	**Scores**
1989	Orangeville Northmen	Kitchener-Waterloo Braves	4-3
1990	Orangeville Northmen	Kitchener-Waterloo Braves	4-2
1991	Huntsville Hawks	Elora Mohawks	4-2
1992	Scarborough Saints	Orillia Kings	4-0
1993	Owen Sound Flying Dutchmen	Orillia Kings	4-2
1994	Orillia Kings	Niagara Spartan Warriors	4-1
1995	Orillia Kings	St. Catharines Spartan Warriors	4-0

**Year**	**West**	**East**	**Series**	**Scores**
1996	**St. Catharines Spartan Warriors**	Orillia Kings	4-1
1997	Six Nations Rebels	**Orillia Kings**	0-3	**4-16**, **6-10**, **10-28**
1998	**Six Nations Rebels**	Clarington Green Gaels	4-2	8-9, **13-10**, **12-11**, **7-5**, 7–11, **10-4**
1999	**Elora Mohawks**	Clarington Green Gaels	3-1	**8-7**, **12-11** OT, 10–11, **9-8**
2000	Elora Mohawks	**Clarington Green Gaels**	2-4	**8-9** 2OT, 9–7, **7-10**, 7–6, **7-8**, **10-11** OT
2001	**Wallaceburg Red Devils**	Scarborough Saints	FC*	N/A
2002	**St. Catharines Spartan Warriors**	Clarington Green Gaels	3-0	**9-3**, **8-4**, **13-5**
2003	Six Nations Rebels	**Barrie Tornado**	2-3	15-8, **10-15**, **6-8**, 12–5, **8-11**
2004	Elora Mohawks	**Clarington Green Gaels**	2-3	16-4, **8-9**, 12–1, **7-8** OT, **7-10**
2005	**Elora Mohawks**	Oakville Buzz	3-1	**9-7**, **14-5**, 4–9, **9-8**
2006	Orangeville Northmen	**Oakville Buzz**	1-3	**5-10**, **6-8**, 8–7, **1-5**
2007	**Six Nations Rebels**	Clarington Green Gaels	3-0	**8-6**, **10-7**, **9-6** OT
2008	**Six Nations Rebels**	Halton Hills Bulldogs	3-1	**12-3**, **10-2**, 4–8, **8-6**
2009	Elora Mohawks	**Clarington Green Gaels**	0-3	**4-10**, **7-12**, **7-13**
2010	Elora Mohawks	**Halton Hills Bulldogs**	2-3	**11-14**, **8-9**, 7–1, 8–7, **3-8**
2011	**Six Nations Rebels**	Halton Hills Bulldogs	3-2	**14-11**, 6–9, 5–8, **13-9**, **10-7**
2012	**Six Nations Rebels**	Akwesasne Lightning	3-0	**15-6**, **8-7**, **11-10**
2013	**Six Nations Rebels**	Clarington Green Gaels	3-1	**19-10**, **6-4**, 9–13, **7-5**
2014	**Six Nations Rebels**	Halton Hills Bulldogs	3-0	**16-2**, **14-13**, **13-5**
2015	Six Nations Rebels	**Akwesasne Indians**	1-3	**6-11**, **12-15** OT, 10–8, **5-9**
2016	**Orangeville Northmen**	Clarington Green Gaels	3-0	**7-6**, **9-8**, **7-4**
2017	**Orangeville Northmen**	Clarington Green Gaels	3-2	8-9 OT, **7-6** OT, 10-11 2OT, **13-8**, **13-5**
2018	**Elora Mohawks**	Clarington Green Gaels	3-1	**13-5**, **9-7**, 4–8, **10-4**
2019	**Six Nations Rebels**	Akwesasne Indians	3-2	7-10, **10-9**, 5–11, **11-6**, **9-7**
2020 & 2021 Season Cancelled due to COVID-19
2022	Windsor Clippers	**Nepean Knights**	0-3	**4-6**, **6-11**, **1-8**
2023	Akwesasne Thunder	**Six Nations Rebels**
2024	**Elora Mohawks**	Kahnawake Hunters

(*) denotes that OLA championship was awarded through a superior record at Founders Cup/Castrol Cup tournament.

== Former teams ==
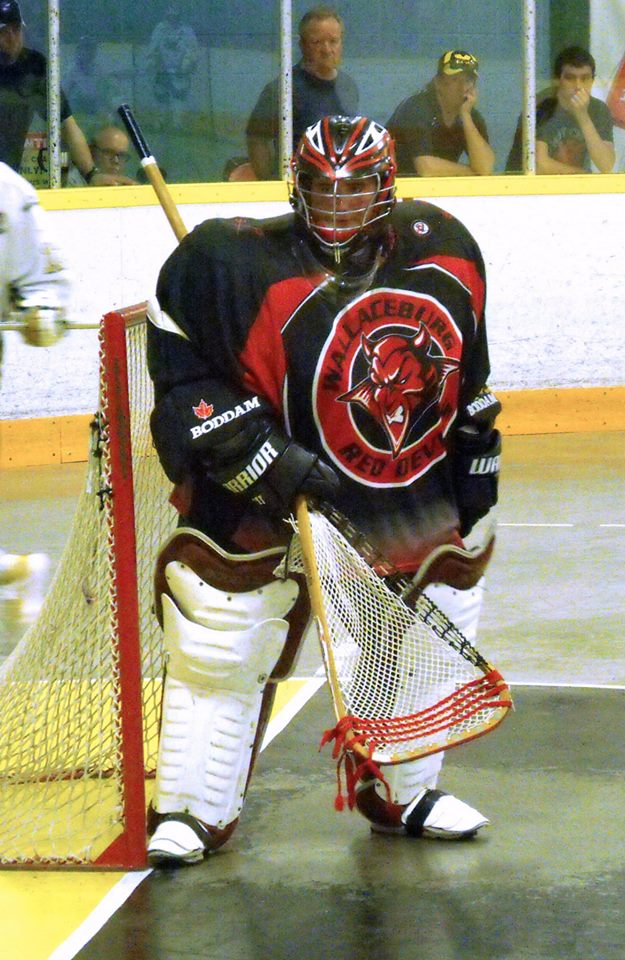
Wallaceburg Red Devils goalie (2014).

- Barrie Tornado (Relocated to Orillia in 2009 in return getting Orillia Junior A franchise in Barrie)
- Brantford Posse (Folded after 2002 season)
- Huntsville Hawks (Moved to Junior C in 2011)
- Kitchener-Waterloo Braves (Moved to Junior A in 1991)
- Mimico Mountaineers (Mississauga Junior A moved to Mimico in 2015 folding Mimico Junior B)
- Mississauga Tomahawks (Moved to Junior A in 1988)
- Oakville Buzz (Moved to Junior A in 2019)
- Niagara Thunderhawks (Folded in 2021)
- Onondaga Redhawks (Folded after 2003 season)
- Orangeville Northmen (Moved to Junior A in 1991)
- Scarborough Saints (Renamed Newmarket Saints in 2006, renamed Redbirds in 2025)
- Six Nations Arrows (Moved to Junior A in 1990)
- St. Catharines Spartans (Integrated into the St. Catharines Athletics organization in 2021)
- Toronto Beaches (Folded after 1983 season)
- Windsor Warlocks (Folded after 1985 season)
