= Mimico Mountaineers =

Canadian box lacrosse association

- Sport: Box lacrosse
- Founded: 1993
- League: Ontario Junior A Lacrosse League
- Based in: Toronto, Ontario
- Arena: Mimico Arena
- Colours: Blue and White
- Head coach: Dean George
- General manager: Anthony Smitheram

The Mimico Junior A Mountaineers are a Jr. A box lacrosse association in Toronto, Ontario, Canada. The Mountaineers operate junior-age and younger teams. Their home arena is Mimico Arena in the Mimico neighbourhood of Toronto. Beginning in 2015, their primary junior team will be a member of the Ontario Junior A Lacrosse League. From 1993 until 2014, the Mountaineers were members of the Ontario Junior B Lacrosse League.

== History ==
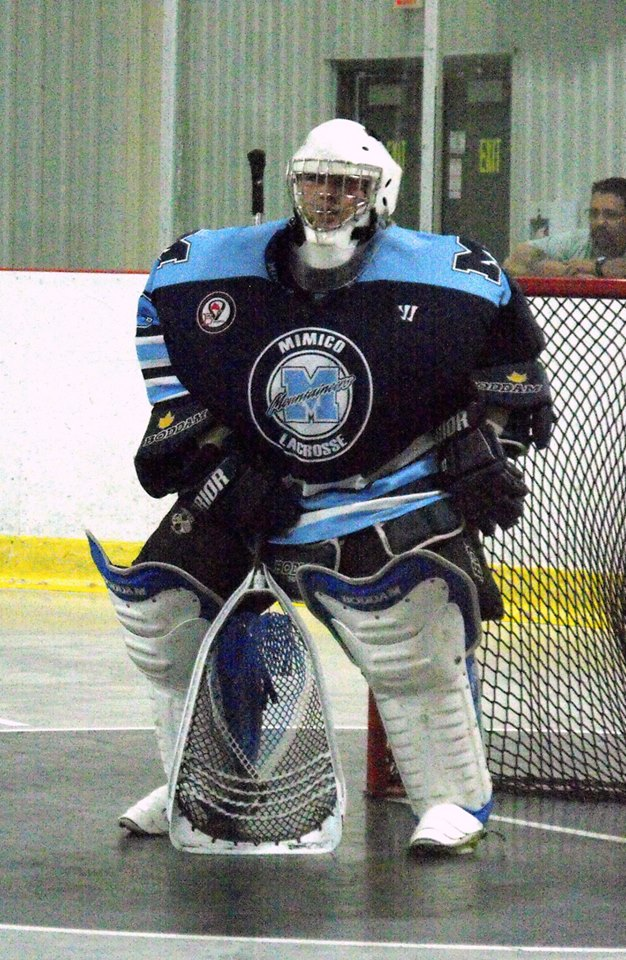
Mountaineers goalie 2014

The Mimico Lacrosse Club was established in 1890 as a field lacrosse organization. In 1931, when the Canadian Lacrosse Association chose the box lacrosse game as its new form of play, the Mimico Lacrosse Club built an outdoor box at the corner of Church Street (Royal York) and Drummond Street, where the game has been played continuously until today. The Mountaineers won the Mann Cup in 1932 and 1942, and Eastern Canadian Senior titles in 1943 and 1947. In World War II, Conn Smythe's 30th Light Anti-aircraft Battery, dubbed "The Sportsmen's Battery", included every member of the Mimico Mountaineers who won the 1942 Mann Cup. Minto Cup victories were also recorded in 1938 and 1951, with Eastern Canadian championships in 1941 and 1946.

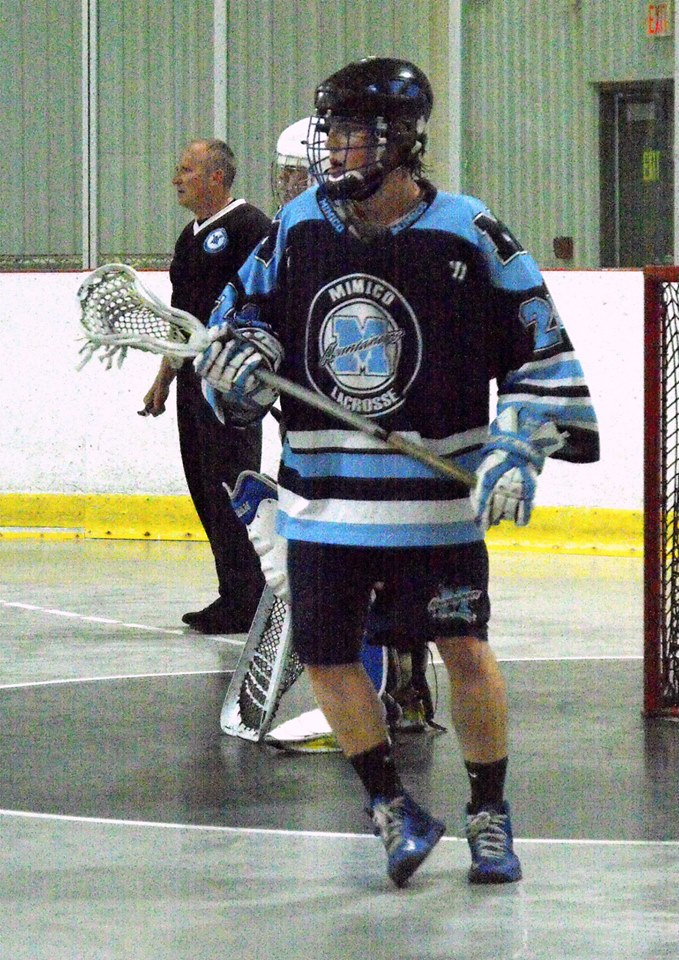
Mountaineers player 2014

1993-: Since the expansion in 1993 with the Nepean Knights, the Mimico Mountaineers never really wavered from "average", and lacked consistency between 1993 and 2000. Between 2001 and 2010 there had been noticeable improvement, but ultimately even during this time of success the Mountaineers found themselves bowing out in the early stages of the playoffs. Mimico then once again found themselves near the bottom of the league between 2011 and 2014; their final four years in the Jr. B Association.

2006: The Mountaineer line-up for the 2006 season included 10 rookies and the team went the furthest it has even been into the playoffs. The 2006 season was a somewhat landmark year for the Mountaineers, as they made the playoff semi-finals. After defeating the Clarington Green Gaels 3 games to 1 and the Barrie Tornado in the quarter-finals 3 games to 1, the Mountaineers quietly exited the playoffs via 3–0 sweep to the eventual Founders Cup champions, the Oakville Buzz.

2014: On June 26, 2014 the Jr. B Mountaineers amalgamated with the Mississauga Tomahawks of the Ontario Junior A Lacrosse League. The Jr. B Mountaineers program will no longer operate following the 2014 season. The Jr. B Tomahawks become the official affiliate of the Jr. A Mountaineers, beginning in 2015.

2015: In their first Jr. A season, the Mountaineers finished a respectable 10th in the OLA-A; finishing above last place St. Catherines Athletics. This was the first season for the Mountaineers in Jr. A lacrosse since 1978. The last time the Tomahawks/Mountaineers franchise won five games in a season was back in 2007; wherein the Tomahawks as well finished in 10th place. This season, the Mimico Mountaineers won more games than the entire Tomahawks franchise did over the past five seasons; a strong indication of some early success for the Jr. A Mountaineers.

2016: The Mountaineers finish a surprising 4th in the OLA-A. This marks the first time since 1978 that the Mountaineers will compete in the Jr. A playoffs, and the first time since 2000 that the newly amalgamated Mississauga/Mimico franchise as a whole will participate in the playoffs. This is a huge step for the Mountaineers organization, who won 12 of their 20 regular season games, including an 8-2 home record. Impressively, the Mountaineers swept the Burlington Chiefs 3-0 in the quarterfinals; however, they too would be swept themselves by the Six Nations Arrows, 4-0 in the semifinals.

== Season-by-season results ==
Note: GP = Games played, W = Wins, L = Losses, T = Ties, Pts = Points, GF = Goals for, GA = Goals against

Season	GP	W	L	T	GF	GA	PTS	Placing	Playoffs
1993	22	6	16	0	169	268	12	10th OJBLL	DNQ
1994	22	7	15	0	196	253	14	11th OJBLL	DNQ
1995	22	11	10	1	222	212	23	3rd OJBLL East	Lost quarter-final
1996	22	17	5	0	274	202	34	2nd OJBLL East	Lost quarter-final
1997	22	14	8	0	301	212	28	4th OJBLL East	Lost quarter-final
1998	20	4	16	0	154	264	8	8th OJBLL East	DNQ
1999	20	7	13	0	156	219	14	7th OJBLL East	Lost 1st round
2000	20	5	15	0	173	245	10	7th OJBLL East	DNQ
2001	20	10	9	1	177	167	21	6th OJBLL East	Lost 1st round
2002	22	12	9	1	216	182	25	6th OJBLL East	Lost 1st round
2003	20	13	6	1	194	160	27	4th OJBLL East	Lost quarter-final
2004	20	14	6	0	193	130	28	3rd OJBLL East	Lost quarter-final
2005	20	15	5	0	204	128	30	4th OJBLL East	Lost 1st round
2006	20	14	6	0	217	159	28	4th OJBLL East	Lost semi-final
2007	20	15	5	0	198	139	30	2nd OJBLL East	Lost quarter-final
2008	20	14	6	0	215	136	28	6th OJBLL East	Eastern Conference Finalist
2009	20	11	8	1	198	177	23	5th OJBLL East	Eastern Conference Semi-Finalist
2010	20	13	7	0	193	133	26	4th OJBLL East	Founders Cup Silver Medalists
2011	20	6	14	0	196	215	26	10th OJBLL East	DNQ
2012	20	9	11	0	224	229	18	7th OJBLL East	Lost Conference Quarter-Finals
2013	20	10	10	0	175	175	20	6th OJBLL East	Lost Conference Quarter-Finals
2014	20	5	15	0	161	217	10	10th OJBLL East	DNQ
2015	20	5	14	1	142	207	11	10th OLA-A	DNQ
2016	20	12	8	0	156	171	24	4th OLA-A	Lost semi-finals
2017	20	12	8	0	185	147	24	3rd OLA-A	Lost finals
2018	20	11	9	0	163	168	22	7th OLA-A	Lost quarter-finals
2019	20	9	11	0	197	190	18	8th OLA-A	Lost quarter-finals
2020	Season cancelled due to COVID-19 pandemic								
2021	8	5	3	0	73	59	10	2nd of 5 East; 4th of 11 OJLL	Lost semi-final, 6-7 (Athletics)
2022	20	16	4	0	270	198	32	1st OJLL	Lost quarter-finals 3-0 (Chiefs)
2023	20	13	7	0	224	183	26	3rd OJLL	Lost semi-finals 4-1 (Blaze)
2024	20	12	8	0	198	178	24	3rd OJLL	Lost finals 4-3 (Northmen)

=== Previous franchise ===
Season	GP	W	L	T	GF	GA	PTS	Placing	Playoffs
1961	24	8	16	0	194	270	16	5th OLA-A	DNQ
1962	20	5	15	0	154	232	10	5th OLA-A	DNQ
1963	24	8	16	0	225	273	16	7th OLA-A	DNQ
1964	24	9	15	0	264	354	18	7th OLA-A	DNQ
1965	20	17	3	0	322	229	34	2nd OLA-A	Lost final
1966	24	21	3	0	381	252	42	2nd OLA-A	Lost final
1967	24	13	11	0	285	294	26	4th OLA-A	Lost quarter-final
1968	24	8	16	0	242	287	16	8th OLA-A	Lost quarter-final
1977	22	5	17	0	261	383	10	10th OLA-A	DNQ
1978	24	7	17	0	241	326	14	4th OLA-A West	Discipline Suspension—DNQ

== Founders Cup ==
CANADIAN NATIONAL CHAMPIONSHIPS

Year	Round Robin	Record W-L-T	Standing	Semifinal	Bronze Medal Game	Gold Medal Game
1997; HOST	W, Iroquois Nationals 13-10; Game 2 vs. Team Nova Scotia; Game 3 vs. Edmonton Miners; Game 4 vs. Orillia Kings; L, Six Nations Red Rebels 4-13	?-?-?		L, Six Nations Red Rebels 6-7 OT	L, Iroquois Nationals 4-11	N/A
2010; HOST	W, Team Quebec 15-11; W, Nova Scotia Schooners 12-5; W, Calgary Chill 10-3; W, Kamloops Venom 10-6; W, Edmonton Warriors 8-5	5-0-0	1st of 6 Ruby Lang Division	W, Calgary Mountaineers 8-5	N/A	L, Halton Hills Bulldogs 3-4 2OT
