= West Durham Ironheads =

Junior lacrosse team in Pickering, Canada

- Sport: Box lacrosse
- Founded: 2002
- League: OLA Junior B Lacrosse League
- Based in: Pickering, Ontario
- Arena: Pickering Recreation Complex
- Colours: Black, Red, and White
- Head coach: Pat Gregoire; Brock Levick; Mike Lum-Walker; James Malloy
- General manager: Ron Reed

The West Durham Ironheads are Junior "B" box lacrosse team from Pickering, Ontario, Canada. The Ironheads play in the OLA Junior B Lacrosse League.

== History ==
The West Durham Ironheads (formerly the Markham Ironheads) are a relatively new team. The 2006 season was their fifth in the league and they have shown substantial growth, gaining access to the playoffs in their past three seasons.

- Their first-ever OLA Junior "B" game took place on April 20, 2002, against the Onondaga Warriors (now of the Iroquois league)—a 20–9 loss. Their first-ever victory came on April 28, 2002, against the Nepean Knights. In their fourth-ever game, they beat the Knights by a score of 9–5.

They have yet to win a playoff round.

The Ironheads are the Jr. B affiliate of the Toronto Beaches of the Ontario Jr. A Lacrosse League.

In 2010, the Ironheads moved to Ajax and played out of the Ajax Community Centre while retaining the "Markham Ironheads" name. In 2017, the Ironheads officially changed their name to the "West Durham Ironheads" and affiliated with the West Durham Minor Lacrosse Association. In 2018, the Ironheads moved once again, this time to Pickering. The West Durham Ironheads now play their home games at Delany Arena at the Pickering Recreation Centre.

On one hot night in the summer of 2013, the Ironheads equipment manager Sean "Boa" Gillespie invented the "Seannie Shuffle", in which he danced while wiping the floor of sweat and condensation while also getting players and fans to cheer uncontrollably. "Seannie Shuffles" are usually followed by a lengthy towel wave while full sprinting back to the bench.

== Season-by-season results ==
Note: GP = Games played, W = Wins, L = Losses, T = Ties, Pts = Points, GF = Goals for, GA = Goals against

Season	GP	W	L	T	GF	GA	PTS	Placing	Playoffs
2002	22	4	18	0	165	262	8	10th OLA-B East	DNQ
2003	20	7	13	0	163	201	14	10th OLA-B East	DNQ
2004	20	10	8	2	196	180	20	8th OLA-B East	Lost 1st Round
2005	20	9	11	0	179	169	18	7th OLA-B East	Lost 1st Round
2006	20	10	10	0	180	157	20	8th OLA-B East	Lost 1st Round
2007	20	8	12	0	139	183	16	9th OLA-B East	DNQ
2008	20	4	14	2	123	182	10	11th OLA-B East	DNQ
2009	20	7	11	2	145	174	16	7th OLA-B East	Lost Conference Quarter-Finals
2010	20	4	16	0	117	166	8	11th OLA-B East	DNQ
2011	20	9	11	0	219	223	18	7th OLA-B East	Lost Conference Quarter-Finals
2012	20	7	13	0	167	234	14	8th OLA-B East	Lost Conference Quarter-Finals
2013	20	9	11	0	188	214	18	8th OLA-B East	Lost Conference Quarter-Finals
2014	20	6	13	1	143	191	13	9th OLA-B East	DNQ
2015	20	9	11	0	168	175	18	8th OLA-B East	Lost Conference Quarter-Finals
2016	20	8	12	0	166	166	16	7th OLA-B East	Lost Conference Quarter-Finals
2017	20	10	9	1	177	199	21	6th OLA-B East	Lost Conference Quarter-Finals
