= Huntsville Hawks =

- Sport: Box lacrosse
- Founded: 1965
- League: Ontario Junior C Lacrosse League
- Based in: Huntsville, Ontario
- Arena: Jack Bionda Arena
- Colours: Green, Black, and Yellow
- President: Shelly Nobile

The Huntsville Hawks are Junior "C" box lacrosse team from Huntsville, Ontario, Canada. The Hawks play in the Ontario Junior C Lacrosse League. They were known as the Huntsville Legionaires in 1965, Huntsville Tornadoes in 1966, and as the Huntsville Hawks from 1967 to the present.

== History ==
The Hawks were one of the oldest running Junior "B" teams in lacrosse prior to 2010. The Hawks won the second ever National title, then known as the Castrol Cup in their inaugural season. They also pulled off a second National title in 1991, winning the Founders Cup.

Since their last Founders Cup, the Hawks have found it hard to draw top talent to the Huntsville area and their season results have suffered. The team also had to fold in 2000 to rebuild some of its interior structure. The fold happened after a winless 1999 season. Since another winless season in 2004, the past two season have gone a little smoother for the Hawks with two straight 6-14-0 seasons. In 2007 the club almost went .500, only to suffer through yet another winless season in 2008. Although there were marginal gains in 2009 & 2010, it is clear the Hawks were going to have a tough time competing going forward.

At the 2010 OLA AGM, the Hawks asked for admission into the OLA Jr. C Lacrosse League, dropping from Jr. B.

=== 1991 Founders Cup ===
At the end of the 1991 season, the Hawks were in 4th place overall with a 13-5-0 record. With home advantage in the first round of the playoffs, they drew the fifth seed Gloucester Griffins. The Griffins did not provide much of a challenge as the Hawks swept them 3 games to none. In the league semi-final, the Hawks drew the first place Scarborough Saints in a best-of-seven series. After dropping the first two games, the Hawks walked through them in four straight. The finals saw them take on the second seed Elora Mohawks. In another upset, the Hawks again lost the first two games, only to take the next four to clinch the Provincial title. The 1991 Founders Cup was played in the host city of Gloucester, Ontario. In their opening game, Huntsville once again met their first round playoff opponents, the host team Gloucester Griffins and beat them by a 12–5 score. The Hawks next met the West Coast champion Delta Islanders, and dropped a close decision 10–9. Next came the Manitoba team, whom the Hawks defeated easily. Thanks to a defeat for the Islanders at the hands of the Griffins, Huntsville qualified for the finals, wherein they defeated Gloucester 18–6 to claim the 1991 Founders Cup.

== Season-by-season results ==
Note: GP = Games played, W = Wins, L = Losses, T = Ties, Pts = Points, GF = Goals for, GA = Goals against

Season	GP	W	L	T	GF	GA	PTS	Placing	Playoffs
1966	24	9	15	0	265	365	18	6th OLA-A	Lost quarter-final
1967	24	14	10	0	343	304	28	3rd OLA-A	Lost semi-final
1968	24	12	12	0	282	339	24	3rd OLA-A	Lost semi-final
1969	24	13	11	0	303	323	26	5th OLA-A	Lost quarter-final
1970	28	1	27	0	243	593	2	8th OLA-A	DNQ
1974	26	8	18	0	285	377	16	7th OLA-C Central	Eliminated in Round Robin
1975	24	12	11	1	356	364	25	4th OLA-C Central	Lost semi-final
1976	22	11	11	0	313	311	22	4th OLA-C	Lost quarter-final
1977	24	11	13	0	346	333	22	6th OLA-C	Lost quarter-final
1978								OLA-B	
1979	22	17	4	1	385	253	35	1st OLA-B East	
1980	16	14	2	0	314	153	28	1st OLA-B East	Lost quarter-final
1981	18	8	10	0	258	206	16	4th OLA-B East	Lost quarter-final
1982	20	7	13	0	232	272	14	6th OLA-B East	DNQ
1983	22	15	7	0	333	259	30	2nd OLA-B East	Lost semi-final
1984	20	13	6	1	301	216	27	1st OLA-B Div III	Lost semi-final
1985	24	16	7	1	278	246	33	2nd OLA-B East	Lost semi-final
1986	18	10	8	0	252	209	20	3rd OLA-B East	Lost semi-final
1987	20	16	4	0	303	185	32	1st OLA-B East	Lost final
1988	20	7	13	0	197	203	14	5th OLA-B East	DNQ
1989	20	12	8	0	231	172	24	5th OLA-B	Lost semi-final
1990	20	14	5	1	258	176	29	3rd OLA-B	Lost quarter-final
1991	18	13	5	0	261	202	26	4th OLA-B	Won League, won Founders Cup
1992	20	10	9	1	255	224	21	5th OLA-B	Lost semi-final
1993	22	4	18	0	194	289	8	11th OLA-B	DNQ
1994	22	7	14	1	202	235	15	10th OLA-B	DNQ
1995	22	4	18	0	170	260	8	5th OLA-B Central	DNQ
1996	22	8	14	0	207	298	16	5th OLA-B East	DNQ
1997	22	4	18	0	192	304	8	6th OLA-B East	DNQ
1998	20	5	15	0	169	243	10	6th OLA-B East	DNQ
1999	20	0	20	0	126	325	0	9th OLA-B East	DNQ
2000	0	-	-	-	-	-	-	Folded	
2001	20	1	19	0	141	294	2	11th OLA-B East	DNQ
2002	22	3	19	0	173	259	6	11th OLA-B East	DNQ
2003	20	5	15	0	122	203	10	12th OLA-B East	DNQ
2004	20	0	20	0	102	256	0	12th OLA-B East	DNQ
2005	20	6	14	0	160	236	12	8th OLA-B East	Lost 1st round
2006	20	6	14	0	145	188	12	10th OLA-B East	DNQ
2007	20	9	10	1	188	188	19	6th OLA-B East	Lost Round 1
2008	20	0	20	0	131	256	0	13th OLA-B East	DNQ
2009	20	6	14	0	120	217	12	9th OLA-B East	DNQ
2010	20	3	16	1	100	253	7	13th OLA-B East	DNQ
2011	16	0	16	0	68	225	0	6th OLA-C Central	DNQ
2012	15	3	11	1	61	169	7	5th OLA-C Central	DNQ
