= East Coast Junior Lacrosse League =

- Most recent season or competition: 2024
- Sport: Box lacrosse
- First season: 2004
- No. of teams: 11
- Country: Canada
- Most recent champion: Sackville Wolves (M) Sackville Wolves (F) (2025)
- Most titles: Halifax Hurricanes (M) (8)
- Website: ECJLL website

The East Coast Junior Lacrosse League is a junior-level Canadian box lacrosse league headquartered in Nova Scotia, Canada.

The ECJLL has two divisions, a men's and a women's league. The men's league has five teams in Nova Scotia and one in New Brunswick, and the women's league has four teams in Nova Scotia and one in New Brunswick. The ECJLL operates from May to July, with playoff teams competing yearly for the Garnet Knight Cup (for males) or the East Coast Cup (for females).

== History ==
The league formed in 2004 with five inaugural teams for its first season, the Dartmouth Bandits, Halifax Northwest Rebels, Halifax Southwest Hurricanes, Moncton Mavericks, and Sackville Wolves.

A second-tier "B" league was added in 2012 with Eastern Shore Breakers, St. Margaret's Bay Storm and Truro Bearcats competing against "B" teams from Halifax Northwest, Moncton and Sackville. This league was operational for only two years with St. Margaret's ceasing operation after the 2012 season and Sackville failing to finish their 2013 season.

Only four teams competed in the league in 2014, with the Moncton Mavericks going on hiatus for the duration of the season. Halifax Northwest rebranded as the Northwest Marley Lions. The Mavericks returned in 2015 along with a new team, the Truro-based Mi'kmaq Warriors. In 2016, the Mavericks changed their name from Moncton to the New Brunswick Mavericks.

The 2018 season saw the Halifax Northwest Marley Lions withdraw from play and a dispersal draft spread their players throughout the remaining teams on a one-year release. The ECJLL operated as a five team league for the duration of the season.

Prior to the 2019 season, Halifax Northwest moved to St. Margaret's Bay and rebranded once again as the St. Margaret's Bay Rebels. Previously dispersed players were recalled and the St. Margaret's Bay Rebels began operation, restoring the league to six teams.

The 2020 season was cancelled due to the COVID-19 pandemic.

The league completed a shortened 2021 season with 5 teams, as the New Brunswick Mavericks were unable to compete due to Covid-19 restrictions. The Dartmouth Bandits won their 5th consecutive Garnet Knight Cup, their 7th title overall, making them the most successful franchise in ECJLL history.

League champions have in the past moved on to represent Team Nova Scotia at the Founders Cup, the Canadian National Junior B championship. The ECJLL has produced some notable players, including players who have gone on to play in the National Lacrosse League (NLL) NCAA Division II, NCAA Division III, CUFLA and Ontario Junior A and B leagues.

== ECJLL (F) ==
The league announced the creation of a female division, ECJLL (F) in January 2022, and in February announced the inaugural four franchises, the Eastern Shore Breakers, Halifax Hurricanes, Sackville Wolves, and Saint John Rapids)

Between May and June 2022 the 12-game inaugural season was played. The Halifax Hurricanes and Sackville Wolves tied in the standings with identical 10-2 records, but Halifax was awarded first place by virtue of the tie-breaking formula. The Sackville Wolves defeated Eastern Shore Breakers 2-0 in a best-of-three semi-finals and went on to face the Halifax Hurricanes in the finals. Halifax did not allow a goal against in their two shutout wins to take the first-ever ECJLL Female Division Championship and the East Coast Cup.

In the 2023 season, Halifax Hurricanes and Sackville Wolves once again tied in the standings with identical 9-3 records. Halifax was awarded first place in the tie-breaking formula. Finishing third with a 6-6 regular season record, Eastern Shore Breakers went on to defeat Sackville Wolves 2-0 in a best-of-three semi-final series. Halifax Hurricanes took game 1 of this best-of-three final series 7-1. Eastern Shore Breakers beat Halifax 11-5 in the second game. Eastern Shore Breakers took the win in the final 5-2, and were awarded the East Coast Cup.

In December 2023, the ECJLL announced the creation of a fifth franchise for the female division, the Dartmouth Bandits, to begin play in 2024.

The ECJLL(F) has produced some notable players, including players who have gone on to play NCAA Division I and II.

== Teams ==
=== ECJLL (M) Teams ===
Team	City	Arena	Formed
Dartmouth Bandits	Dartmouth, Nova Scotia	Shearwater Arena	2005
Halifax Hurricanes	Halifax, Nova Scotia	Spryfield Lions Arena	2005
St. Margaret's Bay Rebels	St. Margaret's Bay, Nova Scotia	Spryfield Lions Arena	2019
Mi'kmaq Warriors	Truro, Nova Scotia	Colchester Arena	2015
Saint John Rapids	Saint John, New Brunswick	Lord Beaverbrook Rink	2022
Sackville Wolves	Lower Sackville, Nova Scotia	Sackville Arena	2005

=== Former teams ===
- Suburban Storm (2006–2008)
- Halifax Northwest Rebels (2004–2013)
- Halifax Northwest Marley Lions (2014–2017)
- Moncton Mavericks (2009–2013, 2015)
- New Brunswick Mavericks (2016–2019)

=== ECJLL (F) teams ===
Team	City	Arena	Formed
Eastern Shore Breakers	Musquodoboit, Nova Scotia	Eastern Shore Arena	2022
Halifax Hurricanes	Halifax, Nova Scotia	Spryfield Lions Arena	2022
Saint John Rapids	Saint John, New Brunswick	Lord Beaverbrook Rink	2022
Sackville Wolves	Lower Sackville, Nova Scotia	Sackville Arena	2022
Dartmouth Bandits	Dartmouth, Nova Scotia	Shearwater Arena	2024

== Garnet Knight Cup Champions [ECJLL(M)] ==
Season	Champions	Runner-up	Results
2004	Halifax Northwest Rebels		(Best of 5)
2005	Suburban Storm	Halifax Northwest Rebels	(Best of 5)
2006	Halifax Northwest Rebels	Suburban Storm	(Best of 5)
2007	Halifax Northwest Rebels	Suburban Storm	(Best of 5)
2008	Halifax Southwest Hurricanes	Sackville Wolves	(Best of 5)
2009	Dartmouth Bandits	Sackville Wolves	3-1 (best of 5)
2010	Halifax Southwest Hurricanes	Halifax Northwest Rebels	3-2 (best of 5)
2011	Dartmouth Bandits	Halifax Southwest Hurricanes	3-1 (best-of 5)
2012	Halifax Southwest Hurricanes	Halifax Northwest Rebels	3-0 (best of 5)
2013	Halifax Southwest Hurricanes	Moncton Mavericks	3-1 (best-of 5)
2014	Halifax Southwest Hurricanes	Halifax Northwest Marley Lions	4-0 (best-of 7)
2015	Halifax Southwest Hurricanes	Halifax Northwest Marley Lions	3-2 (best-of 5)
2016	Dartmouth Bandits	Halifax Northwest Marley Lions	3-0 (best of 5)
2017	Dartmouth Bandits	Halifax Southwest Hurricanes	3-0 (best of 5)
2018	Dartmouth Bandits	Halifax Hurricanes	3-2 (best of 5)
2019	Dartmouth Bandits	Sackville Wolves	3-0 (best of 5)
2020	no season due to Covid-19		
2021	Dartmouth Bandits	Sackville Wolves	2-0 (best of 3)
2022	Halifax Hurricanes	Sackville Wolves	3-1 (best of 5)
2023	Halifax Hurricanes	Saint John Rapids	3-2 (best of 5)
2024	Sackville Wolves	Saint John Rapids	3-0 (best of 5)

== East Coast Cup Champions [ECJLL(F)] ==
Season	Champions	Runner-up	Results	Ref.
2022	Halifax Hurricanes	Sackville Wolves	2-0 (Best-of-3)	
2023	Eastern Shore Breakers	Halifax Hurricanes	2-1 (Best-of-3)	

== Notable players and alumni ==
The ECJLL has evolved into a competitive and skilled lacrosse league producing players and coaches who have gone on to continue their lacrosse careers at the NCAA, national and professional levels. Notable players/alumni include:

- Alex Bechard (St. Lawrence University)
- Zac Carrigan (Mars Hill University)
- Brett Draper (Colorado Mammoth)
- Jack Dulong (Team Canada & Grizzlies)
- Jamie Dunbar (New England College)
- Matt Dunbar (Guilford College)
- Adam Gallop (Emmanuel College)
- Michael Gallop (Emmanuel College)
- Brian Huyghue (Limestone College & Team Canada)
- Halley James (Mars Hill University)
- Hannah Kent (Niagara University)
- Chet Koneczny (Halifax Thunderbirds, Philadelphia, Orlando, Washington, Colorado)
- Liam McGrath (Lenoir-Rhyne University & Team Canada)
- Jordan McKenna (Toronto Rock)
- Ian McShane (Victoria Shamrocks)
- Jake Mosher-McGraw (Tampa University)
- Alex Pace (Philadelphia Wings)
- Luke Parker (Briarcliffe College)
- Breton Penney (Lynchburg College)
- Luke Smeltzer (Rochester Institute of Technology)
- Jeremy Vautour (St. Lawrence University)
- Zach Watson (St. Michaels University)

== League Awards ==
=== All-Star Awards ===
1st Team All-Stars ECJLL
Year	League	Offense	Defense	Goalie	Ref.
2023	(F)	Rachel Cormier Pearce Batchilder Hannah Kent	Maddi Hamilton Samantha Taylor	Greer Nagel	
2023	(M)	Ben Allison Francis Greyson Nate Watson	Thomas Davies Cooper Puma	Gage MacPhee	
2022	(F)	Elizabeth Smithers Brooke Rose Macy Giles	Samantha Taylor Jenna Giffin	Greer Nagel	
2022	(M)	Glen Holmes Shamus Locke Isaac Abbott	Alex Bechard Ben Normandeau	Gage MacPhee	
2021	(M)	Zac Carrigan Jordan McKenna Glen Holmes	Chris Duplisea Brett Draper	Nate Jollymore	
2019	(M)	Zac Carrigan Jake Mosher Glen Holmes	Mark Seward Chris Malette	Ayden Pierro	
2018	(M)	Breton Penney Jake Mosher-McGraw	Kirk Drabble Chris Malette Thomas Bakeeff	Alex Mitchell	
2017	(M)	Breton Penney Mitch Broussard Jake Mosher-McGraw	Chris Duplisea Chris Mallette	Matt Kent	
2016	(M)	Bobby Green Andrew Neilson John MacDonald	Alex Bungay Liam MacDonald	Ayden Pierro	
2015	(M)	Max McBride John MacDonald Trey Carvery	Gee Clarke Nick Simpson	Jake Nordin	

2nd Team All-Stars ECJLL(F)
Year	League	Offense	Defense	Goalie	Ref.
2023	(F)	Sofia Mullen Macey Hatfield	Sophie LeMarquand Anne Christie Emily Todd	Kate Heaslip	
2023	(M)	Chris Bungay Ayden McCaustlin	Aiden Carr Isaac Abbott Jack Cowen	Zack Malcom	
2022	(F)	Rachel Cormier Kelsie Johnson Cadence Haas	Maddi Hamilton Grace Landry	Alli Dyer	
2022	(M)	Francis Greyson Ethan Muir Luke Wilson	Thomas Davies Grant Keefe	Noah Cox	
2021	(M)	Mitch Broussard Luke Wilson	Theo Grant Chris Malette Mark Seward	Noah Cox	
2019	(M)	Mitch Broussard Dakota Morrisey Connor Dennis	Kirk Drabble Ian Connors	Alex Mitchell	
2018	(M)	Zac Carrigan Glen Holmes Jordan Mckenna	Chris Burgess Chris Duplisea	Brett McKinnon	
2017	(M)	Max McBride Luke Smeltzer	Nic Thompson Chris Burgess Liam MacDonald Geoff Zed	Keegan Delaney	
2016	(M)	Luke Smeltzer Connor Aquanno Brian Huyghue	Bret Himmelman	Matt Kent	
2015	(M)	Paddy Quinn Jesse Magarvey Bryson Knockwood	Nathan Clarke Keith Langille	Dan Hubley	

Offensive All-Stars (2013 only)
Player	Ref.
Rod Diamond	
Alex Taylor
Paddy Quinn
Brian Huyghue
Rick Canning
Jon Boutin

Defensive All-Stars (2013 only)
Player	Ref.
Matt Beck	
Andrew Leonard
Trey Carvery
John Gagnier
Shane MacMillan
Matt McConnell

=== Individual Awards ===
Indigenous Player of the Year
Year	League	Player	Ref.
2023	(M)	Dakota Copp	
2022	(F)	Kiley Brow	
2022	(M)	Joseph Asselstine Dakota Morrisey	
2021	(M)	Connor Dennis	

Offensive Player of the Year
Year	League	Player	Ref.
2023	(F)	Pearce Batchilder	
2023	(M)	Ben Allison	
2022	(F)	Elizabeth Smithers	
2022	(M)	Glen Holmes	
2021	(M)	Zac Carrigan	
2019	(M)	Zac Carrigan	
2018	(M)	Breton Penney	
2017	(M)	Breton Penney	
2016	(M)	Andrew Neilson	
2015	(M)	John MacDonald	
2013	(M)	Paddy Quinn	

Top Scorer
Year	League	Player	Ref.
2023	(F)	Pearce Batchilder	
2023	(M)	Ben Allison	
2022	(F)	Elizabeth Smithers	
2022	(M)	Glen Holmes	
2021	(M)	Zac Carrigan	
2019	(M)	Zac Carrigan	
2018	(M)	Breton Penney	
2017	(M)	Breton Penney	
2016	(M)	Andrew Neilson	
2015	(M)	Rob Diamond	

Defensive Player of the Year
Year	League	Player	Ref.
2023	(F)	Samatha Taylor	
2023	(M)	Thomas Davies	
2022	(F)	Jenna Giffin	
2022	(M)	Alex Bechard	
2021	(M)	Chris Duplisea	
2019	(M)	Mark Seward	
2018	(M)	Thomas Bakeeff	
2017	(M)	Chris Duplisea	
2016	(M)	Liam MacDonald	
2015	(M)	Gee Clarke	
2013	(M)	Trey Carvery	

Goalie of the Year
Year	League	Player	Ref.
2023	(F)	Greer Nagel	
2023	(M)	Gage MacPhee	
2022	(F)	Greer Nagel	
2022	(M)	Gage MacPhee	
2021	(M)	Nate Jollymore	
2019	(M)	Ayden Pierro	
2018	(M)	Alex Mitchell	
2017	(M)	Matt Kent	
2016	(M)	Ayden Pierro	
2015	(M)	Jake Nordin	
2013	(M)	Jon Boutin	

Rookie of the Year
Year	League	Player	Ref.
2023	(F)	Pearce Batchilder	
2023	(M)	Ben Barreiro	
2022	(F)	Macey Hatfield	
2022	(M)	Ethan Muir	
2021	(M)	Isaac Abbott	
2019	(M)	Alfie West	
2018	(M)	Jordan Whitford	
2017	(M)	Liam McGrath	
2016	(M)	Andrew Neilson	
2015	(M)	Alex Pace	
2013	(M)	Brian Huyghue	

Coaching Staff of the Year
Year	League	Team	Ref.
2023	(F)	Halifax Hurricanes	
2023	(M)	Halifax Hurricanes	
2022	(F)	Saint John Rapids	
2022	(M)	Sackville Wolves	
2021	(M)	Halifax Hurricanes	
2019	(M)	Sackville Wolves	

Coach of the Year
Year	League	Coach	Ref.
2018	(M)	Andrew MacNeil	
2017	(M)	Jamie Dunbar	
2016	(M)	Luke Parker	
2015	(M)	Gary Wallace	
2013	(M)	Mitch Hannigan	

Team MVPs
Year	Ref.	League	Team	Player
2015		(M)	Hurricanes	Jake Nordin
2015		(M)	Marley Lions	John McDonald
2015		(M)	Wolves	Connor Aquanno
2015		(M)	Warriors	Bryson Knockwood
2015		(M)	Mavericks	Jesse Magarvey
2015		(M)	Bandits	Trey Carvery
2013		(M)	Hurricanes	Adam Gaunce
2013		(M)	Marley Lions	Paddy Quinn
2013		(M)	Bandits	Jon Boutin
2013		(M)	Mavericks	Rob Diamond
2013		(M)	Wolves	Cody Marche
