= Barrie Lakeshores =

Canadian lacrosse team

- Sport: Box lacrosse
- Founded: 2000
- League: OLA Junior A Lacrosse League
- Based in: Barrie, Ontario
- Arena: Innisfil Recreation Complex
- Colours: Blue, Red, and White
- Head coach: Dave Ree, Brett Kloepfer, Brandon Ree, Steph Charbonneau
- General manager: Mike Kloepfer

The Barrie Lakeshores are Junior "A" box lacrosse team from Barrie, Ontario, Canada. The Lakeshores play in the OLA Junior A Lacrosse League.

== History ==
Founded in 2000 as an Ontario Jr. B lacrosse team, the Barrie Tornado were named after the deadly 1985 tornado that put the Canadian City on the map.

The 2000 season, their first season, was a good start but nothing special. Since then, the Tornado have never slipped below a .500 record. Between 2000 and 2003, the team got progressively better. In 2000, they started out with a 5–15–0 record. The next season, the Tornado performed much better with an even 10–10–0 record, making the playoffs. In the first round, the squad faced the Green Gaels, the defending Canadian Champs. The boys from Barrie made quick work defeating the Gaels 3–1. The Tornado moved onto the second round and faced the Scarborough Saints, and eventually fell in a 5-game series. In 2002, Barrie had a 14–7–1 record in an extended 22-game season. Barrie met the Saints again in the first round defeating them 3–0. In the second round, the Tornado faced off against the Gaels yet again. In a back and forth series, the Tornado succumbed to the Gaels in 5 games. (The Gaels would eventually claim the Canadian Championship.)

Logo before joining Jr. A.

2003 was the coming out party for the Tornado. By the end of the season, Barrie clinched first in the Eastern Conference with a 15–4–1 record. In the first round of the playoffs, Barrie took on the Oakville Buzz. The series, surprisingly, went the distance. The long series was a sign of the beginning of the growth of a young and quickly developing Buzz team. The Tornado took the series 3 games to 2. The Quarter-finals were against the Mimico Mountaineers. Barrie very quickly went down 2 games to none in the best-of-5 series. To the dismay of the Mountaineers, Barrie pulled themselves back together and won the next 3 games straight to earn a berth to the Conference final. In the Eastern Conference final, the Barrie Tornado took on the Nepean Knights. The Tornado won the series without much trouble, 3 games to 1, to earn a berth into the League final.

The finals determine the OLA's representative at the National Championships. The Tornado's opponent in the Provincial championship was the Six Nations Red Rebels. The two teams split the first two games of the best-of-5 final series with Six Nations winning 15–8 and Barrie taking game two 15–10. Barrie won a hard-fought 8–6 win on the Six Nations home floor only to have the Rebels return the favour in on the Barrie floor with a 12–5 win to force a game 5. The thrilling series came to an end with Barrie Tornado claiming an 11–8 victory to win the Ontario title and the J. A. MacDonald Trophy to earn a berth into the 2003 Founders Cup tournament in Port Coquitlam, British Columbia.

=== 2003 Founders Cup ===
The National Championship opened for Barrie against Juan de Fuca on August 20, 2003. The Tornado dominated their opponents, defeating them by a score of 11–5. The same day, Barrie played their second game against Coquitlam. The result was indicative of a team playing their second game of the day, as they squashed Coquitlam by a score of 17–3.

Day two, August 21, saw Barrie crush Edmonton by a score of 13–3. August 22, had Barrie play their last game of the round robin against Winnipeg, defeating them 18–7. The victory clinched first place in Pool A, and a berth into the semi-final against Prince George. In the end, Barrie pulled out a squeaker as they defeated Prince George by a close and low scoring 7–6 decision. In the other semi, Coquitlam defeated Port Coquitlam by a score of 10–8 to meet Barrie in the final.

Although the final between Barrie and Coquitlam was a lot closer than their first meeting, the Tornado cruised to a 16–8 win to earn their first ever Founders Cup as National Junior "B" Champions.

=== Since 2003 ===
Barrie had a pair of rebuilding years in 2004 and 2005, but came back to form in 2006 with a 17–2–0 record. However, the Tornado were upset in the quarter-finals by the Mimico Mountaineers, cutting down the dream of a second Founders Cup. Following the 2008 season the Tornado switched leagues with the Orillia Rama Kings and are now a member of the Ontario Junior A Lacrosse League. They now go by the name Barrie Lakeshores.

== Season-by-season results ==
Note: GP = Games played, W = Wins, L = Losses, T = Ties, Pts = Points, GF = Goals for, GA = Goals against

| Season | GP | W | L | T | GF | GA | PTS | Placing | Playoffs |
|---|---|---|---|---|---|---|---|---|---|
| 2000 | 20 | 5 | 15 | 0 | 146 | 272 | 10 | 8th OLA-B East | DNQ |
| 2001 | 20 | 10 | 10 | 0 | 209 | 202 | 20 | 7th OLA-B East | Lost quarter-final |
| 2002 | 22 | 14 | 7 | 1 | 253 | 205 | 29 | 4th OLA-B East | Lost quarter-final |
| 2003 | 20 | 15 | 4 | 1 | 245 | 159 | 31 | 1st OLA-B East | Won League, won Founders Cup |
| 2004 | 20 | 10 | 10 | 0 | 204 | 166 | 20 | 9th OLA-B East | DNQ |
| 2005 | 20 | 11 | 8 | 1 | 215 | 148 | 23 | 6th OLA-B East | Lost 1st round |
| 2006 | 19 | 17 | 2 | 0 | 202 | 119 | 34 | 2nd OLA-B East | Lost quarter-final |
| 2007 | 20 | 11 | 9 | 0 | 176 | 139 | 22 | 5th OLA-B East | Lost quarter-final |
| 2008 | 20 | 13 | 6 | 1 | 160 | 129 | 27 | 7th OLA-B East | Lost 1st round |
| 2009 | *22 | 8 | 15 | 0 | 188 | 215 | 16 | 9th OLA-A | DNQ |
| 2010 | 22 | 4 | 18 | 0 | 174 | 279 | 8 | 10th OLA-A | DNQ |
| 2011 | 22 | 7 | 15 | 0 | 187 | 270 | 14 | 10th OLA-A | DNQ |
| 2012 | 20 | 3 | 17 | 0 | 174 | 274 | 6 | 10th OLA-A | DNQ |
| 2013 | 20 | 10 | 10 | 0 | 186 | 191 | 20 | 7th OLA-A | Lost quarter-final |
| 2014 | 20 | 8 | 12 | 0 | 190 | 224 | 16 | 9th OLA-A | DNQ |
| 2015 | 20 | 9 | 10 | 1 | 159 | 175 | 19 | 7th OLA-A | Lost quarter-final |
| 2016 | 20 | 6 | 14 | 0 | 152 | 177 | 12 | 9th OLA-A | DNQ |
| 2017 | 20 | 3 | 16 | 1 | 131 | 197 | 7 | 11th OLA-A | DNQ |
| 2018 | 20 | 2 | 18 | 0 | 88 | 197 | 4 | 11th OLA-A | DNQ |
| 2019 | 20 | 0 | 20 | 0 | 82 | 247 | 0 | 12th OLA-A | DNQ |
