= Mississauga Tomahawks Jr. A =

Canadian box lacrosse team

Mississauga Tomahawks
- Founded: 1973
- League: OLA Junior B Lacrosse League
- Based in: Mississauga, Ontario
- Arena: Port Credit Arena
- Colours: Orange, blue, and white
- President: Craig Ferchat

The Mississauga Tomahawks were a Junior "A" box lacrosse team from Mississauga, Ontario, Canada. The Tomahawks played in the OLA Junior A Lacrosse League. Some former Tomahawks players who have gone on to professional lacrosse are John Tavares, Peter Tavares, Anthony Cosmo, Jeff Shatler, Drew Candy, Jamie McKeracher, Cory Leigh, John Rosa, Rob Kirkby, Ted Dowling, Mat Giles, Jason Clark, Neil Doddridge and Ted Dowling.

On June 26, 2014 the Board of Governors and the OLA Board of Directors approved the relocation of the Jr. A Tomahawks to Mimico, beginning in 2015. This is a franchise amalgamation between the Jr. A Tomahawks and the Jr. B Mountaineers. The Jr. B Tomahawks remain the direct affiliate of the Jr. A Mountaineers. Their women's affiliate team is the Mississauga Trilliums of the Ontario Women's Lacrosse.

== History ==
Current franchise

Mississauga Athletics 19xx - 1974
Mississauga Sullivan Homes 1975 - 1976
Mississauga Merchants 1977 - 1979
Mississauga Arrowheads 1980 - 1984
Mississauga Tomahawks 1985 - 2014

Traditional franchise

Toronto Township PCO's 1965 - 1967
Mississauga Athletics 1968 - 1974
Mississauga Chiefs 1975 - 1976
Mississauga Builders 1977 - 1980
Mississauga Tomahawks 1981 - 1983

== Current franchise season-by-season results ==
Note: GP = Games played, W = Wins, L = Losses, T = Ties, Pts = Points, GF = Goals for, GA = Goals against

Season	GP	W	L	T	GF	GA	PTS	Placing	Playoffs
1979	22	14	8	0	346	317	28	3rd OLA-B East	
1980	16	7	9	0	235	233	14	4th OLA-B Central	Lost 1st round
1981	20	9	11	0	262	251	18	5th OLA-B West	DNQ
1982	24	15	9	0	319	324	30	3rd OLA-B West	Lost quarter-final
1983	22	13	9	0	288	243	26	4th OLA-B East	Lost quarter-final
1984	20	16	4	0	308	216	32	1st OLA-B Div IV	Lost semi-final
1985	24	20	4	0	369	257	40	1st OLA-B West	Lost final
1986	18	18	0	0	453	160	36	1st OLA-B East	Won League, won Founders Cup
1987	24	21	3	1	432	253	42	1st OLA-B West	Won League
1988	24	8	15	1	268	371	17	6th OLA-A	DNQ
1989	24	7	17	0	244	347	14	6th OLA-A	DNQ
1990	20	7	13	0	188	298	14	6th OLA-A	Lost quarter-final
1991	20	11	9	0	247	214	22	4th OLA-A	Lost quarter-final
1992	20	8	11	1	224	230	17	8th OLA-A	Lost quarter-final
1993	22	12	10	0	303	322	24	7th OLA-A	Lost quarter-final
1994	26	7	19	0	242	364	14	5th OLA-A East	DNQ
1995	20	7	13	0	170	214	14	8th OLA-A	Lost quarter-final
1996	20	6	12	2	157	271	14	8th OLA-A	Lost quarter-final
1997	18	5	13	0	166	215	10	8th OLA-A	Lost quarter-final
1998	22	8	14	0	210	261	16	9th OLA-A	DNQ
1999	20	7	13	0	195	208	14	7th OLA-A	Lost quarter-final
2000	20	12	8	0	210	194	24	4th OLA-A	Lost quarter-final
2001	20	7	13	0	196	221	14	9th OLA-A	DNQ
2002	20	3	17	0	164	239	6	11th OLA-A	DNQ
2003	20	7	12	1	197	239	15	9th OLA-A	DNQ
2004	20	0	20	0	138	267	0	11th OLA-A	DNQ
2005	22	3	19	0	167	304	6	11th OLA-A	DNQ
2006	22	7	15	0	203	275	14	10th OLA-A	DNQ
2007	18	5	13	0	129	188	10	10th OLA-A	DNQ
2008	22	2	20	0	113	212	4	12th OLA-A	DNQ
2009	22	1	21	0	137	330	2	12th OLA-A	DNQ
2010	22	2	20	0	136	361	4	12th OLA-A	DNQ
2011	22	2	20	0	130	295	4	12th OLA-A	DNQ
2012	20	0	20	0	140	313	0	11th OLA-A	DNQ
2013	20	1	19	0	114	266	2	11th OLA-A	DNQ
2014	20	0	20	0	94	280	0	11th OLA-A	DNQ

== Traditional franchise season-by-season results ==
Note: GP = Games played, W = Wins, L = Losses, T = Ties, Pts = Points, GF = Goals for, GA = Goals against

Season	GP	W	L	T	GF	GA	PTS	Placing	Playoffs
1965	20	7	13	0	234	277	14	8th OLA-A	Lost semi-final
1966	24	16	8	0	319	267	32	3rd OLA-A	Lost semi-final
1967	24	18	6	0	315	250	36	2nd OLA-A	Lost final
1968	24	11	13	0	289	257	22	4th OLA-A	Lost final
1969	24	14	10	0	418	364	28	4th OLA-A	Lost semi-final
1970	28	16	12	0	435	369	32	4th OLA-A	Lost quarter-final
1971	30	11	19	0	374	403	22	6th OLA-A	Lost quarter-final
1972	28	12	15	1	356	366	25	4th OLA-A	Lost quarter-final
1973	28	12	15	1	359	366	25	5th OLA-A	Lost quarter-final
1974	28	20	8	0	397	333	40	2nd OLA-A	Lost final
1975	28	18	10	0	446	359	36	2nd OLA-A	Lost final
1976	26	14	10	2	423	368	30	2nd OLA-A West	Lost semi-final
1977	22	16	6	0	392	276	32	2nd OLA-A	Lost quarter-final
1978	30	12	18	0	410	469	24	4th OLA-A East	Lost quarter-final
1979	28	13	15	0	397	469	26	4th OLA-A East	Lost quarter-final
1980	20	11	9	0	339	353	22	6th OLA-A	Lost quarter-final
1981	20	6	14	0	274	359	12	7th OLA-A	Lost quarter-final
1982	20	6	13	1	248	347	13	6th OLA-A	Lost quarter-final
1983	24	7	16	1	270	345	15	8th OLA-A	Lost Tier II Semi-final

== Mississauga Junior "C" ==
The Mississauga farm system also incorporated a Junior "C" team in the 1970s as a feeder team.

Mississauga Athletics 1973 - 1974
Mississauga Medics 1975 - 1977
Mississauga Renegades 1978

Season	GP	W	L	T	GF	GA	PTS	Placing	Playoffs
1973	26	19	7	0	422	305	38	1st OLA-C Div B	Lost semi-final
1974	26	21	5	0	475	284	42	1st OLA-C Central	Eliminated in Round Robin
1975	24	16	7	1	382	270	33	1st OLA-C Central	Won League
1976	22	11	11	0	301	268	22	3rd OLA-C	Lost quarter-final
1977	24	13	11	0	332	309	26	5th OLA-C	Lost quarter-final
1978	20	11	9	0	314	269	22	3rd OLA-C	Lost semi-final
