= Halton Hills Bulldogs =

- Sport: Box lacrosse
- Founded: 1992
- League: OLA Junior B Lacrosse League
- Based in: Georgetown, Ontario
- Arena: Mold-Masters Sportsplex (Alcott Arena)
- Colours: Black, Red, and White
- Head coach: Blaine McCauley
- General manager: Mike Hancock
- History: Caledon Bandits 1992–1995; Georgetown Bulldogs 1995–1999; Halton Hills Bulldogs 2000 to Present

The Halton Hills Bulldogs are Junior "B" box lacrosse team from Georgetown, Ontario, Canada. The Bulldogs play in the OLA Junior B Lacrosse League.

== History ==
The Bulldogs joined the OLA-B in 1995. Despite the 1999–2000 name change, the team has always played out of Georgetown.

The Bulldogs first four seasons were mediocre at best and their fifth season was horrible. The 1999 season (0-21-0), although terrible served as a catalyst for turning Halton into a winning lacrosse team.

The 2000 season turned out to be an excellent turnaround for the team. Changing their name during the wintertime, the Bulldogs went from no wins in 1999 to an 8-12-0 record. They failed to make the playoffs that year, but did qualify for the "Tier II" Championship—and won. Since winning the Tier II title, Halton has not had a losing season. The only unfortunate point is that the Bulldogs, despite having some regular season success, have yet to do very well in the playoffs. In six straight playoff berths, the Bulldogs have yet to get past the quarter-finals. Another highpoint in their recent history is that for the past six seasons, the team's goals for have surpassed the number of goals against. Once again though, making the playoffs is one thing, having success in them is another.

In 2002, the Bulldogs were awarded the right to host the prestigious Founders Cup Tournament. This gave the Bulldogs an automatic berth in the national tourney. In pool play the Bulldogs came second to the Ontario Champs from Spartan. This put them in the semi-finals against the Clarington Green Gaels. The Bulldogs, despite a huge effort from everyone involved could not pull out the victory as the Gaels came from behind to win 7–5 in overtime. While the Gaels went on to win the tournament, the Bulldogs were forced to play in the bronze medal game against Edmonton. In the end it was not meant to be as the Miners defeated the Bulldogs 9–7 in overtime.

In 2010, the Bulldogs won the Founders Cup, defeating the host Mimico Mountaineers 4–3 in double overtime.

== Season-by-season results ==
Note: GP = Games played, W = Wins, L = Losses, T = Ties, Pts = Points, GF = Goals for, GA = Goals against

Season	GP	W	L	T	GF	GA	PTS	Placing	Playoffs
1992	20	1	18	1	154	279	3	11th OLA-B	DNQ
1993	22	11	11	0	229	233	22	8th OLA-B	Lost quarter-final
1994	22	9	13	0	193	217	18	7th OLA-B	Lost quarter-final
1995	22	7	15	0	158	230	14	4th OLA-B Central	DNQ
1996	22	12	10	0	221	193	24	5th OLA-B West	Won Tier II Title
1997	22	5	17	0	174	285	10	7th OLA-B West	DNQ
1998	24	7	17	0	201	263	14	7th OLA-B West	DNQ
1999	21	0	21	0	141	285	0	10th OLA-B West	DNQ
2000	21	8	12	0	181	206	16	6th OLA-B West	Won Tier II Title
2001	20	12	6	2	239	182	26	5th OLA-B West	Lost quarter-final
2002	22	16	5	1	265	145	33	3rd OLA-B West	Lost quarter-final
2003	20	10	9	1	193	164	21	8th OLA-B East	Lost 1st round
2004	20	14	6	0	199	131	28	4th OLA-B East	Lost quarter-final
2005	20	11	7	2	175	147	24	5th OLA-B East	Lost quarter-final
2006	20	10	10	0	182	141	20	6th OLA-B East	Lost 1st round
2007	20	14	6	0	216	129	28	4th OLA-B East	Lost Conference Final
2008	20	15	5	0	224	137	30	4th OLA-B East	Ontario Jr B Finalist
2009	20	17	2	1	208	99	35	2nd OLA-B East	Conference Finalists
2010	20	17	3	0	202	92	34	2nd OLA-B East	Won League & Won Founders Cup
2011	20	17	3	0	216	117	34	2nd OLA-B East	Ontario Jr B Finalist
2012	20	17	2	1	243	130	35	3rd OLA-B East	Lost Conference Semi-Finals
2013	20	17	2	1	262	146	35	2nd OLA-B East	Lost Conference Semi-Finals
2014	20	16	4	0	225	137	32	4th OLA-B East	

== Founders Cup ==
CANADIAN NATIONAL CHAMPIONSHIPS

Year	Round Robin	Record W-L-T	Standing	Semifinal	Gold Medal Game
2010; Etobicoke, ON	W, Onondaga Jr. Redhawks 17-3; W, Calgary Mountaineers 7-3; W, Saskatchewan SWAT 17-4; W, Moncton Mavericks 14-1; W, Winnipeg Gryphons 18-4	5-0-0	1st of 6 Barb Cormier Division	W, Kamloops Venom 11-2	W, Mimico Mountaineers 4-3 2OT; CHAMPIONS
