= Kitchener Kodiaks =

Canadian lacrosse team

- Sport: Box lacrosse
- Founded: 1967(Organization)
- League: OLA Junior A Lacrosse League
- Team history: Kitchener–Waterloo Braves (1967–2020); KW Jr A Lacrosse Club (2020–2026); Kitchener Kodiaks (2020–Present)
- Based in: Kitchener, Ontario
- Arena: Kinsmen Arena
- Colours: Black, Maroon and White
- Head coach: Will Petschenig
- General manager: Doug Arthur

The Kitchener Kodiaks are Junior "A" box lacrosse team from Kitchener, Ontario, Canada. The Kodiaks play in the OLA Junior A Lacrosse League.

== History ==
The Kitchener–Waterloo Braves were founded in 1967. 2017 marked their 50th anniversary of continuous operation. In 2020 the lacrosse team rebranded as the KW Jr A Lacrosse Club and rebranded in 2026 as the Kitchener Kodiaks.

== Season-by-season results ==
Note: GP = Games played, W = Wins, L = Losses, T = Ties, Pts = Points, GF = Goals for, GA = Goals against

Season	GP	W	L	T	GF	GA	PTS	Placing	Playoffs
1976	26	8	16	2	351	427	18	5th OLA-A West	DNQ
1977	22	2	20	0	232	454	4	12th OLA-A	DNQ
1978	24	3	21	0	206	369	6	5th OLA-A West	Lost quarter-final
1979	24	1	23	0	221	479	2	4th OLA-A West	DNQ
1980	20	1	19	0	145	456	2	9th OLA-A	DNQ
1981	20	1	19	0	187	476	2	9th OLA-A	DNQ
1982	24	2	22	0	285	424	4	7th OLA-B West	DNQ
1983	22	3	16	1	271	439	7	6th OLA-B West	DNQ
1984	20	11	8	1	318	300	23	2nd OLA-B Div I	Lost quarter-final
1985	24	15	9	0	405	317	30	3rd OLA-B West	Lost quarter-final
1986	20	18	2	0	425	175	36	1st OLA-B West	Lost semi-final
1987	24	13	10	1	296	252	27	4th OLA-B West	Lost quarter-final, won Founders Cup
1988	20	14	5	1	272	171	29	1st OLA-B West	Won League, won Founders Cup
1989	20	20	0	0	263	84	40	1st OLA-B	Lost final
1990	20	19	1	0	275	127	38	1st OLA-B	Lost final
1991	20	11	9	0	201	201	22	6th OLA-A	Lost quarter-final
1992	20	11	9	0	222	193	22	4th OLA-A	Lost semi-final
1993	22	1	21	0	192	334	2	12th OLA-A	DNQ
1994	26	11	15	0	280	289	22	4th OLA-A West	Lost quarter-final
1995	20	8	12	0	189	180	16	7th OLA-A	Lost quarter-final
1996	20	9	10	1	178	221	19	6th OLA-A	Lost quarter-final
1997	18	7	11	0	210	220	14	7th OLA-A	Lost quarter-final
1998	22	16	6	0	288	236	32	3rd OLA-A	Lost quarter-final
1999	20	5	15	0	158	240	10	9th OLA-A	DNQ
2000	20	7	13	0	170	215	14	8th OLA-A	Lost quarter-final
2001	20	2	18	0	143	245	4	11th OLA-A	DNQ
2002	20	5	15	0	157	182	10	9th OLA-A	DNQ
2003	20	11	9	0	181	159	22	4th OLA-A	Lost quarter-final
2004	20	11	8	1	168	150	23	6th OLA-A	Lost quarter-final
2005	22	15	6	1	202	169	31	3rd OLA-A	Lost quarter-final
2006	22	10	10	2	202	186	22	8th OLA-A	Lost quarter-final
2007	18	8	10	0	128	145	16	9th OLA-A	DNQ
2008	22	11	11	0	141	141	22	6th OLA-A	Lost quarter-final
2009	22	7	15	0	183	218	14	10th OLA-A	DNQ
2010	22	6	16	0	187	262	12	9th OLA-A	DNQ
2011	22	7	15	0	186	238	14	9th OLA-A	DNQ
2012	20	11	8	1	215	199	23	5th OLA-A	Lost quarter-final
2013	20	7	12	1	184	190	15	8th OLA-A	Lost quarter-final
2014	20	12	8	0	189	180	15	4th OLA-A	Lost quarter-final
2015	20	6	13	1	149	194	13	9th OLA-A	DNQ
2016	20	8	11	1	153	160	17	7th OLA-A	Lost quarter-final
2017	20	8	11	1	160	183	17	7th OLA-A	Lost quarter-final
2018	20	8	12	0	173	183	17	9th OLA-A	DNQ
2019	20	3	17	0	135	178	6	11th OLA-A	DNQ
2020	Season cancelled due to COVID-19 pandemic								
2021	8	0	8	0	57	95	0	6th of 6 West; 11th of 11 OJLL	Did not qualify
