= St. Catharines Spartans =

- Sport: Box lacrosse
- Founded: 1969
- League: OLA Junior B Lacrosse League
- Based in: St. Catharines, Ontario
- Arena: Merritton Arena & Lions Club
- Colours: Red, Black, and White
- Head coach: Chris Spiers
- General manager: Chris Spiers
- History: Niagara-on-the-Lake Warriors 1969 - 1984; Niagara Spartan Warriors 1985 - 1994; Spartan Warriors 1995 - 2001; St. Catharines Spartans 2002 - 2021; St. Catharines Athletics 2022 - Present

The St. Catharines Spartans were a Junior "B" box lacrosse team from St. Catharines, Ontario, Canada. The Spartans played in the OLA Junior B Lacrosse League.

== History ==
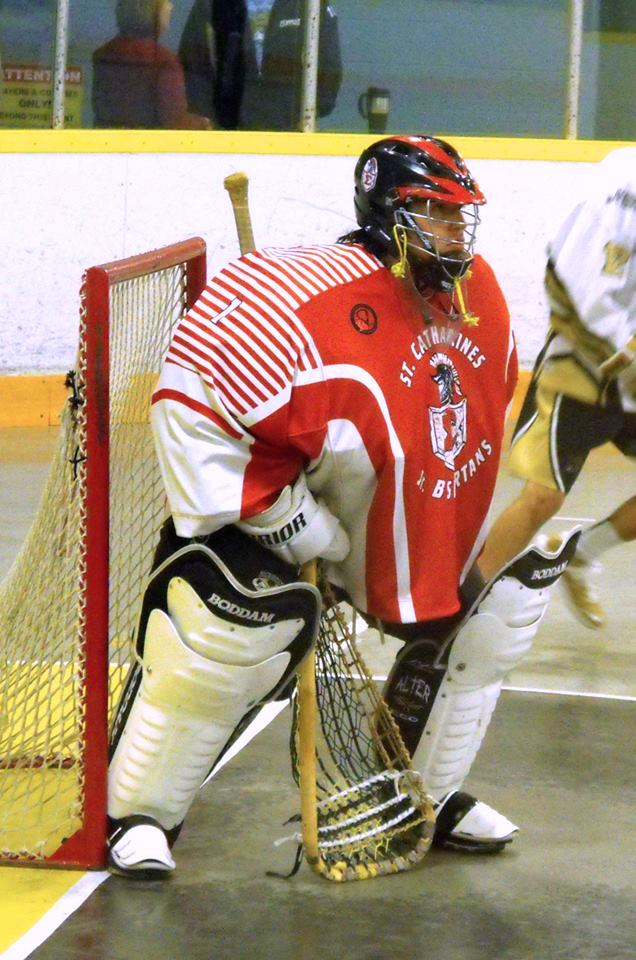
Spartans goalie in 2014.

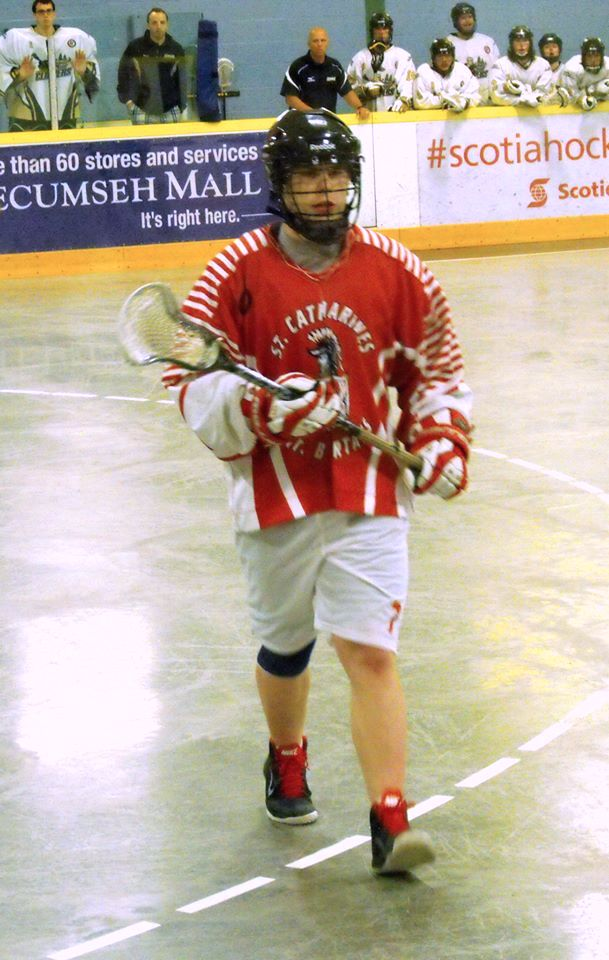
Spartans player in 2014.

The Spartans franchise won the Founders Cup as Canada's Junior B box lacrosse champions in 1981 and 1996. In 2002, the Spartans were league champions again, but lost the national final to the Clarington Green Gaels.

Founded in 1979, as the Niagara-on-the-Lake Warriors, the Warriors won their league and the national championship in only their third season. In 1984, the team changed its name to the Niagara Spartan Warriors.

In 1994, the team shortened its name to just the "Spartan Warriors" and in 1996 won the league and national championships again. In the 1996 national final, the Spartan Warriors defeated the Orillia Rama Kings to win it all after not being able to beat the Kings for nearly 3 years running. After the 2001 season, the team changed its name to the St. Catharines Spartans.

In 2021 the Spartans franchise was acquired by the Junior "A" St. Catharines Athletics Lacrosse Club, which saw the franchise being integrated into the Athletics organization. This resulted in Spartans being renamed to the Athletics and repurposed to serve as a direct affiliate the Junior "A" Athletics, thus ending over 50 years of Spartans Lacrosse History.

== Season-by-season results ==
Note: GP = Games played, W = Wins, L = Losses, T = Ties, Pts = Points, GF = Goals for, GA = Goals against

Season	GP	W	L	T	GF	GA	PTS	Placing	Playoffs
1979	22	4	16	2	248	200	10	5th OJBLL West	
1980	16	8	8	0	214	200	16	3rd OJBLL Central	Lost 1st round
1981	20	18	2	0	363	201	36	1st OJBLL West	Won League, won Founders Cup
1982	24	5	19	0	273	371	10	6th OJBLL West	DNQ
1983	22	14	6	0	322	279	28	3rd OJBLL West	Lost quarter-final
1984	20	9	10	1	272	265	19	2nd OJBLL Div IV	Lost quarter-final
1985	24	13	11	0	315	305	26	5th OJBLL West	Won Tier II Title
1986	20	6	14	0	259	357	12	4th OJBLL West	Lost quarter-final
1987	24	14	10	0	304	371	28	3rd OJBLL West	Lost quarter-final
1988	20	11	8	1	216	223	23	4th OJBLL West	Lost quarter-final
1989	20	10	10	0	189	196	20	6th OJBLL	Lost quarter-final
1990	20	7	12	1	189	229	15	8th OJBLL	Lost quarter-final
1991	18	0	18	0	111	353	0	10th OJBLL	DNQ
1992	20	4	16	0	172	336	8	10th OJBLL	DNQ
1993	22	7	15	0	202	265	14	9th OJBLL	DNQ
1994	22	15	6	1	291	210	31	2nd OJBLL	Lost final
1995	22	18	4	0	345	191	36	1st OJBLL West	Lost final
1996	22	19	3	0	334	201	38	1st OJBLL West	Won League, won Founders Cup
1997	22	16	6	0	304	221	32	2nd OJBLL West	Lost semi-final
1998	24	5	18	1	200	307	11	8th OJBLL West	DNQ
1999	21	15	6	0	259	187	30	2nd OJBLL West	Lost semi-final
2000	21	14	7	0	238	189	28	3rd OJBLL West	Lost quarter-final
2001	20	15	5	0	229	136	30	3rd OJBLL West	Lost 1st round
2002	22	19	2	1	233	123	39	1st OJBLL West	Won League
2003	20	17	2	1	245	123	35	1st OJBLL West	Lost semi-final
2004	20	17	3	0	267	119	34	2nd OJBLL West	Lost semi-final
2005	20	18	2	0	270	129	36	1st OJBLL West	Lost quarter-final
2006	20	13	7	0	167	134	26	4th OJBLL West	Lost quarter-final
2007	20	9	10	1	151	153	19	9th OJBLL West	DNQ
2008	20	11	9	0	168	166	22	6th OJBLL West	Lost Conference QF
2009	20	12	8	0	126	111	24	7th OJBLL West	Lost Conference QF
2010	20	10	10	0	155	142	20	8th OJBLL West	Lost Conference QF
2011	20	12	7	1	183	161	25	5th OJBLL West	Lost Conference QF
2012	20	13	7	0	202	200	26	4th OJBLL West	Lost Conference QF
2013	20	10	9	1	170	175	21	7th OJBLL West	Lost Conference QF
2014	20	11	9	0	205	161	22	7th OJBLL West	Lost Conference QF
2015	20	10	10	0	157	173	20	7th OJBLL West	Lost Conference QF
2016	20	11	9	0	201	175	22	5th OJBLL West	Lost Conference QF
