= Newmarket Redbirds =

Junior lacrosse team from Ontario, Canada

- Sport: Box lacrosse
- Founded: 1979
- League: OLA Junior B Lacrosse League
- Based in: Newmarket, Ontario
- Arena: Ray Twinney Complex
- Colours: Red, Black, and White
- Head coach: Dan Ransom Sr.
- General manager: Dan Vertolli
- Championships: Founders Cup wins: 1985, 1992; Ontario Titles: 1985, 1992
- Website: www.saintsjrblacrosse.com

The Redbirds Jr B are a Junior "B" box lacrosse team based in Newmarket, Ontario, Canada. The Redbirds play in the OLA Junior B Lacrosse League. Founded in 1979, the Saints lacrosse club has built a rich history over the last four decades. Initially based out of Scarborough, the team raised its first Founder's Cup in 1985. Seven years later the Saints tasted glory again, winning the 1992 Jr B Championship.

After 23 years, the Saints moved from Scarborough to their current home in Newmarket in 2008.

Hundreds of players have worn the red, white and blue team colors, a number of whom went on to play professionally.

2018 marks the 40th season for the Saints lacrosse club.

In 2025 the team changed it name from Saints to Redbirds

== History ==
=== Season-by-season results ===
Note: GP = Games played, W = Wins, L = Losses, T = Ties, Pts = Points, GF = Goals for, GA = Goals against

Season	GP	W	L	T	GF	GA	PTS	Placing	Playoffs
Scarborough Saints
1977	22	1	21	0	185	357	2	Founders Cup	
1979	22	1	21	0	185	357	2	6th OLA-B East	
1980	16	2	14	0	128	276	4	5th OLA-B East	DNQ
1981	18	1	17	0	146	358	2	7th OLA-B East	DNQ
1982	20	7	13	0	220	265	14	7th OLA-B East	DNQ
1983	22	10	12	0	216	237	20	9th OLA-B East	DNQ
1984	20	18	1	1	401	173	37	1st OLA-B Div II	Lost final
1985	24	23	0	1	533	145	47	1st OLA-B East	Won League, won Founders Cup
1986	18	4	13	1	188	278	9	6th OLA-B East	DNQ
1987	20	14	6	0	235	173	28	3rd OLA-B East	Lost quarter-final
1988	20	12	7	1	290	210	25	3rd OLA-B East	Lost quarter-final
1989	20	7	13	0	188	210	14	8th OLA-B	Lost quarter-final
1990	20	5	15	0	165	248	10	9th OLA-B	DNQ
1991	18	15	2	1	259	167	31	1st OLA-B	Lost semi-final
1992	20	20	0	0	332	135	40	1st OLA-B	Won League, won Founders Cup
1993	22	3	19	0	214	367	6	11th OLA-A	DNQ
1994	25	2	22	1	244	439	5	6th OLA-A East	DNQ
1995	22	14	8	0	240	231	28	2nd OLA-B East	Lost quarter-final
1996	22	15	7	0	272	214	30	4th OLA-B East	Lost quarter-final
1997	22	18	4	0	322	219	36	2nd OLA-B East	Lost quarter-final
1998	20	13	7	0	214	171	26	4th OLA-B East	Lost quarter-final
1999	20	10	10	0	227	201	20	5th OLA-B East	Lost quarter-final
2000	20	12	8	0	191	189	24	4th OLA-B East	Lost quarter-final
2001	20	13	6	1	227	185	27	4th OLA-B East	Lost final
2002	22	13	9	0	215	178	26	5th OLA-B East	Lost 1st round
2003	20	12	8	0	170	150	24	5th OLA-B East	Lost 1st round
2004	20	13	7	0	199	166	26	5th OLA-B East	Lost 1st round
2005	20	1	19	0	126	224	2	10th OLA-B East	DNQ
2006	20	10	10	0	181	158	20	7th OLA-B East	Lost quarter-final
2007	20	7	13	0	184	180	14	10th OLA-B East	DNQ
Newmarket Saints
2008	20	14	6	0	190	131	28	5th OLA-B East	Lost Conference Quarter-Finals
2009	20	16	4	0	191	117	32	3rd OLA-B East	Lost Conference Semi-Finals
2010	20	16	4	0	189	108	32	3rd OLA-B East	Lost Conference Semi-Finals
2011	20	12	8	0	222	195	24	6th OLA-B East	Lost Conference Semi-Finals
2012	20	12	8	0	229	222	24	5th OLA-B East	Lost Conference Quarter-Finals
2013	20	8	12	0	159	210	16	9th OLA-B East	DNQ
2014	20	9	11	0	180	179	18	7th OLA-B East	Lost Conference Quarter-Finals
2015	20	9	11	0	174	184	18	6th OLA-B East	Lost Conference Quarter-Finals
2016	20	5	15	0	158	207	10	11th OLA-B East	DNQ
2017	20	0	20	0	158	207	0	12th OLA-B East	DNQ
2018	20	8	12	0	158	207	16	7th OLA-B East	Lost Conference Quarter-finals (3–0) Green Gaels
2019	20	6	14	0	129	212	12	9th OLA-B East	DNQ
2020	0	0	0	0	0	0	0	DNP	DNP
2021	0	0	0	0	0	0	0	DNP	DNP
2022	20	0	20	0	145	270	0	12th OLA-B East	DNQ
2023	20	1	19	0	113	277	2	12th OLA-B East	DNQ
2024	20	0	20	0	114	276	0	12th OLA-B East	DNQ
Newmarket Redbirds
2025	20	3	15	1	116	215	7	12th OLA-B East	DNQ
