= Owen Sound North Stars Jr. B =

Owen Sound North Stars
- Sport: Box lacrosse
- Founded: 1973
- League: OLA Junior B Lacrosse League
- Based in: Owen Sound, Ontario
- Arena: Harry Lumley Bayshore Community Centre
- Colours: Orange, Black, and White
- Head coach: Travis Gibbons
- General manager: Ethan Woods
- History: Owen Sound Satellites 1973 - 1977; Owen Sound Forsythes 1978; Owen Sound Signmen 1979 - 1989; Owen Sound Flying Dutchmen 1990 - 2005; Owen Sound Rams 2006 - 2008; Owen Sound North Stars 2009 to Present

The Owen Sound North Stars are Junior "B" box lacrosse team from Owen Sound, Ontario, Canada. The North Stars play in the OLA Junior B Lacrosse League.
