= Orillia Kings =

- Sport: Box lacrosse
- Founded: 1973
- League: OLA Junior B Lacrosse League
- Based in: Orillia, Ontario, Canada
- Arena: West Orillia Rotary Place
- Colours: Red, blue, and white
- General manager: Scott Balkwill

The Orillia Kings are Junior "B" box lacrosse team from Orillia, Ontario, Canada. The Kings play in the OLA Junior B Lacrosse League.

== History ==
Orillia Lions 1973 - 1988
Orillia Kings 1990 - 1997
Orillia Rama Kings 1998 - 2008
Orillia Kings 2009 - Present

== Season-by-season results ==
Note: GP = Games played, W = Wins, L = Losses, T = Ties, Pts = Points, GF = Goals for, GA = Goals against

Season	GP	W	L	T	GF	GA	PTS	Placing	Playoffs
1973	18	17	1	0	349	134	34	1st OLA-C Div C	Lost Tier II Semi-final
1974	26	16	10	0	432	349	32	5th OLA-C Central	Eliminated in Round Robin
1975	24	11	13	0	370	374	22	5th OLA-C Central	Lost Division Quarter-final
1976	22	7	15	0	233	322	14	9th OLA-C	DNQ
1977	24	20	4	0	373	210	40	1st OLA-C	Lost semi-final
1978	20	17	3	0	320	202	34	1st OLA-C	Lost final
1979	24	18	6	0	418	266	36	2nd OLA-C	
1980	16	11	5	0	252	190	22	2nd OLA-B East	Lost 1st round
1981	18	15	3	0	291	181	30	1st OLA-B East	Lost semi-final
1982	20	16	4	0	299	192	32	2nd OLA-B East	Lost semi-final
1983	22	14	8	0	333	283	28	3rd OLA-B East	Lost quarter-final
1984	20	6	14	0	272	307	12	3rd OLA-B Div III	Lost Tier II Semi-final
1985	24	5	19	0	263	387	10	6th OLA-B East	DNQ
1986	0	-	-	-	-	-	-	Folded	
1987	20	8	11	1	206	268	17	5th OLA-B East	DNQ
1988	20	14	6	0	318	219	28	2nd OLA-B East	Lost semi-final
1989	0	-	-	-	-	-	-	Folded	
1990	20	8	12	0	212	244	16	7th OLA-B	Lost quarter-final
1991	18	13	5	0	255	159	26	3rd OLA-B	Lost semi-final
1992	19	15	4	0	304	187	30	2nd OLA-B	Lost final
1993	22	15	7	0	306	194	30	3rd OLA-B	Lost final
1994	22	22	0	0	344	154	44	1st OLA-B	Won League, won Founders Cup
1995	22	20	1	1	325	173	41	1st OLA-B Central	Won League, won Founders Cup
1996	22	18	4	0	389	201	36	1st OLA-B East	Lost final
1997	22	18	3	1	351	171	37	1st OLA-B East	Won League
1998	22	9	13	0	209	251	18	8th OLA-A	Lost quarter-final
1999	20	9	11	0	226	252	18	6th OLA-A	Lost quarter-final
2000	20	5	14	1	186	241	10	10th OLA-A	DNQ
2001	20	12	8	0	188	165	24	4th OLA-A	Lost quarter-final
2002	20	9	11	0	186	193	18	7th OLA-A	Lost quarter-final
2003	20	5	15	0	166	211	10	10th OLA-A	DNQ
2004	20	6	14	0	162	210	12	10th OLA-A	DNQ
2005	22	5	17	0	169	232	10	10th OLA-A	DNQ
2006	22	4	18	0	172	255	8	11th OLA-A	DNQ
2007	18	3	14	1	112	180	7	11th OLA-A	DNQ
2008	22	6	15	1	121	199	13	10th OLA-A	DNQ
2009	20	5	14	1	108	164	11	10th OLA-B East	DNQ
2010	20	10	10	0	157	172	20	7th OLA-B East	Lost Conference Quarter-Finals
2011	20	1	19	0	113	335	2	12th OLA-B East	DNQ
2012	20	1	19	0	146	316	2	12th OLA-B East	DNQ
2013	20	0	19	1	142	284	1	12th OLA-B East	DNQ
2014	20	2	18	0	143	287	4	12th OLA-B East	DNQ
