= Nepean Knights =

- Sport: Box lacrosse
- Founded: 1993
- League: OLA Junior B Lacrosse League; Ontario Junior C Lacrosse League
- Based in: Nepean, Ontario
- Arena: Merivale Arena
- Colours: Black, Red, and Yellow
- Head coach: Jr. B - Matt Firth, Jr. C - TBD
- General manager: Matt Firth

The Nepean Knights is a minor lacrosse association playing within the Ontario Lacrosse Association. The name is also shared by The Nepean Knights Jr. B and a newly formed (2019) Junior C team. While the Jr. B team is privately owned, the Junior C team is owned by the minor association.

- Nepean Nights Minor Lacrosse Assosication box lacrosse team from Nepean, Ontario, Canada. The Knights play in the Ontario Lacrosse Association.
- Junior "B" box lacrosse team from Nepean, Ontario, Canada. The Knights play in the OLA Junior B Lacrosse League.
- Junior "C" box lacrosse team from Nepean, Ontario, Canada. The Nepean Knights play in the OLA Junior C Lacrosse League.

== Junior B history ==
The Nepean Knights history actually dates back well before its 1993 inception. The original Nepean junior team was the Nepean Lumberjacks of the OLA Junior "C" league in 1975 and 1976. Nepean was virtually a vacant lot for lacrosse until the 1990s, when locals applied for an expansion team in the OLA. In 1993, the Knights and the Mimico Mountaineers were granted expansion into the OLA Junior "B" league. Unlike Mimico, which has seemed to carry rather average results every year, Nepean seems to have more of one extreme or the other. From 1993 until 1997, the Knights only pulled off 19 victories in 110 contests. They failed to make the playoffs each year and were looking much like a failed franchise. But from 1998 to 2004 with the exception of a rather average 2002 seasons, the Knights hit the OLA like a Bat out of Hell. They made the playoffs seven straight year and made it to the semi-finals four times. They even finished first place in their conference in 1998, and made to the semis in their first ever playoff.

The 2005 to 2007 seasons were not so plentiful. Junior A lacrosse came to Ottawa in 2005 and that team drew most of its players from the Knights roster. This resulted in the team having three straight losing seasons, despite coming close to cracking .500 in 2006. With the Ottawa Titans on a two-year leave of absence, the Knights 2008 season was big improvement with the team going 11-9 and having a strong showing in the playoffs against the Mimico Mountaineers.

== Jr. B season-by-season results ==
Note: GP = Games played, W = Wins, L = Losses, T = Ties, Pts = Points, GF = Goals for, GA = Goals against

Season	GP	W	L	T	GF	GA	PTS	Placing	Playoffs
1993	22	3	18	1	175	285	7	12th OLA-B	DNQ
1994	22	4	18	0	169	316	8	12th OLA-B	DNQ
1995	22	4	18	0	179	318	8	5th OLA-B East	DNQ
1996	22	6	16	0	214	262	12	6th OLA-B East	DNQ
1997	22	2	20	0	133	348	4	7th OLA-B East	DNQ
1998	20	16	4	0	219	171	32	1st OLA-B East	Lost Conference Final
1999	20	13	7	0	232	191	26	3rd OLA-B East	Lost Conference Quarter-Final
2000	20	14	6	0	231	155	28	3rd OLA-B East	Lost Conference Final
2001	20	12	7	1	237	191	25	5th OLA-B East	Lost Conference Final
2002	22	8	13	1	193	244	17	7th OLA-B East	Lost Conference Quarter-Final
2003	20	15	4	1	229	167	31	2nd OLA-B East	Lost Conference Final
2004	20	12	7	1	203	155	25	6th OLA-B East	Lost Conference Quarter-Final
2005	20	5	15	0	116	239	10	9th OLA-B East	DNQ
2006	20	8	12	0	182	201	16	9th OLA-B East	DNQ
2007	20	4	15	1	132	224	9	12th OLA-B East	DNQ
2008	20	11	9	0	210	182	22	3rd OLA-B East	Lost Conference Quarter-Final
2009	20	6	12	2	121	164	14	8th OLA-B East	Lost Conference Quarter-Final
2010	20	5	15	0	92	155	10	10th OLA-B East	DNQ
2011	20	1	19	0	92	281	2	12th OLA-B East	DNQ
2012	20	3	17	0	113	268	6	11th OLA-B East	DNQ
2013	20	10	10	0	194	194	20	5th OLA-B East	Lost Conference Quarter-Final
2014	20	7	13	0	150	179	14	8th OLA-B East	Lost Conference Quarter-Final
2015	20	13	7	0	212	186	26	4th OLA-B East	Lost Conference Quarter-Final
2016	20	3	17	0	155	273	6	12th OLA-B East	DNQ
2017	20	5	15	0	183	229	10	11th OLA-B East	DNQ
2018	20	12	8	0	216	215	24	4th OLA-B East	Lost Conference Quarter-Final
2019	20	13	7	0	241	173	26	4th OLA-B East	Lost Conference Final
2022	20	18	2	0	242	109	36	1st OLA-B East	Won League, Won Founders Cup
2023	20	18	2	0	226	78	36	1st OLA-B East	Lost Conference Semi-Final
2024	20	17	2	1	230	131	35	1st OLA-B East	Lost Conference Semi-Final
2025	20	16	4	0	177	111	32	1st OLA-B East	Lost Conference Semi-Final

== Junior C history ==
In 2019, The Nepean Knights were granted a team to be a part of membership of the OLA Junior "C" league.
