= Drexel Dragons =

Intercollegiate sports teams of Drexel University

Coordinates: 39.96057°N 75.20817°W

- University: Drexel University
- Nickname: Dragons
- NCAA: Division I
- Conference: CAA (primary); EIWA (wrestling); IRA (men's rowing); CSA (squash)
- Athletic director: Maisha Kelly
- Location: Philadelphia, Pennsylvania
- Varsity teams: 18
- Basketball arena: Daskalakis Athletic Center
- Baseball stadium: Ramp Playground Field
- Softball stadium: Vidas Athletic Complex
- Soccer stadium: Vidas Field
- Aquatics center: Daskalakis Athletic Center Pool
- Lacrosse stadium: Vidas Field
- Other venues: Kline & Specter Squash Center (Squash); Villanova Ballpark at Plymouth (Alternate Baseball field)
- Colors: Navy blue and gold
- Mascot: Mario the Magnificent
- Fight song: Drexel Fight Song
- Website: drexeldragons.com
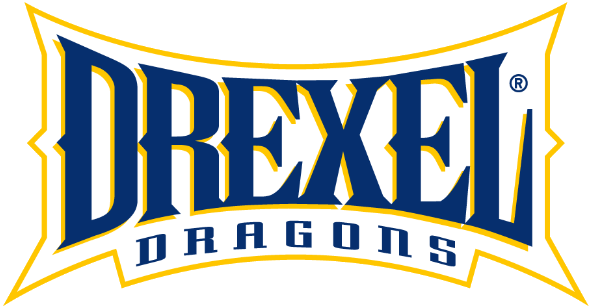

Colonial Athletic Association logo in Drexel's colors

The Drexel Dragons are the athletic teams of Drexel University in Philadelphia, Pennsylvania. The school's athletic program includes eighteen NCAA Division I sports including nine men's and nine women's teams, with most sports teams competing in the Coastal Athletic Association (CAA). Drexel's athletic department was ranked first in gender equity by U.S. News. The university has demonstrated a high level of student-athlete academic performance, with a 10-year NCAA graduation rate of 91% compared to a national average of 85%.

== National championships ==
Drexel has two recognized National Titles: the 1958 Dragon Soccer team, which was voted number one in a year end poll, and the 2012–13 Drexel Dragons women's basketball team, which won the 2013 Women's National Invitation Tournament.

Drexel's women's rifle team won 5 national championships before the NCAA sponsored rifle as a sport in 1947, 1949, 1950, 1952, and 1954.

Drexel's karate team won eleven total National Collegiate Karate Association championships in team kata and kumite between 1988 through 2004.

== Athletic teams ==
Men's sports	Women's sports
Basketball	Basketball
Crew	Crew
Golf	Field hockey
Lacrosse	Lacrosse
Soccer	Soccer
Squash	Softball
Swimming & diving	Squash
Tennis	Swimming & diving
Wrestling	Tennis

Drexel is one of the only 5 NCAA Division I schools that doesn't sponsor volleyball or baseball (The other 4 being Boston University, Detroit Mercy, Saint Joseph's University, and Vermont).

== Facilities ==
In addition to the DAC which is located inside the Main Campus, Drexel utilizes fields located at 43rd and Powelton Avenues, the Vidas Athletic Complex.

== Athletics history ==
=== Men's basketball ===
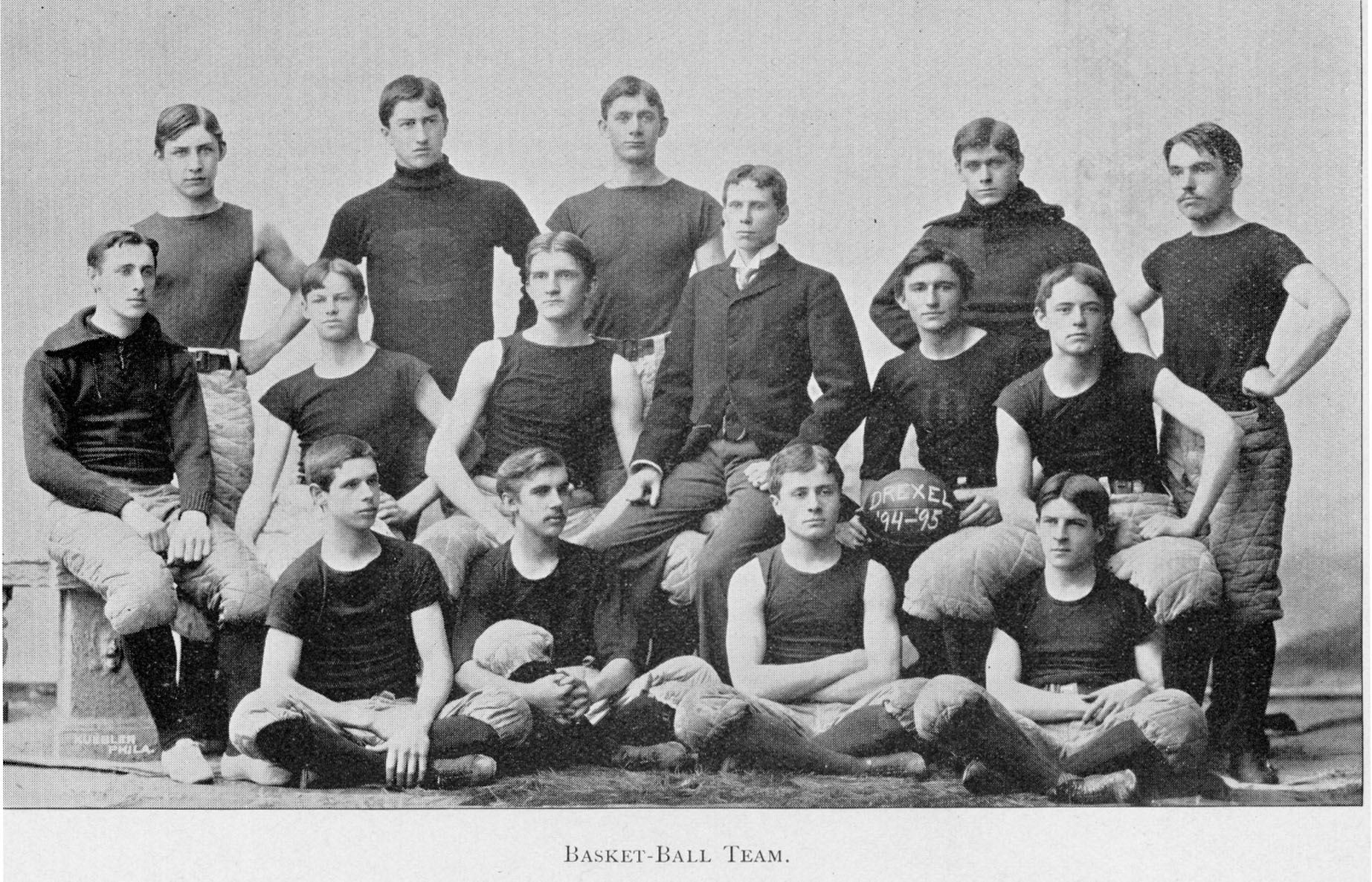
The first Drexel basketball team, fielded for the 1894–95 season

Drexel's first intercollegiate event was a basketball game played against Temple College in January 1895, a game that Drexel won by a score of 26 to 1. The Dragons joined Division I in 1973. Drexel has received bids to five NCAA Division I men's basketball tournaments in 1986, 1994, 1995, 1996, and most recently in 2021.

During the 1996 tournament, Malik Rose led the team to their only second round NCAA appearance after an upset of fifth-seeded Memphis.

Prior to this, Drexel had appeared in four Division II NCAA tournaments in 1957, 1960, 1966 and 1967, including the very first Division II tournament in 1957.

Drexel's men's basketball team was ranked as high as 35th nationally in 2007, finishing the season with a 23–9 record while making the National Invitational tournament for the fourth time in the prior five years.

All Time Record achievements include 1,293 wins, 1,145 losses (through 2018–19 season), and 8 tournament Appearances.

=== Women's basketball ===
In 2009, Drexel women's basketball team ended Old Dominion University's NCAA record 17-year reign as CAA champion with a 62–41 victory in the conference semifinals. Behind Colonial player of the year Gabriela Marginean, Drexel captured its first-ever CAA Basketball championship with a 64–58 victory against James Madison University. This was the Dragon's first CAA tournament title in any sport since joining the conference in 2001–02 and it represented the first NCAA tournament berth for Drexel women's basketball since going Division I in 1982. The win also marked the team's 16th straight since starting off the season with an 8 and 8 record. The Dragons received a number twelve seeding in the 2009 NCAA Division I women's basketball tournament where they lost to Kansas State 68–44.

The 2012–2013 Drexel Dragons finished third in the CAA with a 13–5 conference record and were invited to the Women's National Invitation Tournament. They won six straight games in the NIT postseason tournament, beating Iona (59–50), Harvard (82–72), Bowling Green (50–47), Auburn (56–43), the Lady Florida Gators women's basketball team 67–57, and finally the Lady Utah Utes, 46 to 43, to win the WNIT Championship title.

=== Field hockey ===
Drexel's field hockey team won the 2012 CAA Title for the first time in program history with a 2–1 overtime victory against Northeastern, getting the automatic NCAA tournament bid. In 2009, women's field hockey reached a number of program milestones. The team won the CAA regular season title, earned its first NCAA Tournament berth and picked up its first NCAA Tournament victory. The team's 19 victories broke their 2008 record of 16 wins. The Dragon's defeated No. 5 University of Connecticut, 3–2, in the first round of the NCAA Women's Field Hockey Championship. They reached the 'round of eight' before losing to No. 1 ranked and undefeated University of Maryland. In 2008, Drexel was also ranked at 14th in the nation, before losing in the CAA semi-finals to Old Dominion.

=== Men's lacrosse ===
In 2014, Drexel scored in the third overtime as the Dragons came from behind to defeat Hofstra 11–10, to win its first Colonial Athletic Association championship and earn their first-ever NCAA tournament berth. Drexel trailed by three with five minutes to play in the fourth quarter, but rallied to force the overtime, earn the automatic NCAA bid and win their eighth straight game.

In 2010, men's reached their highest ever ranking at number 7 in the nation, following a win over then number three Notre Dame, the eventual NCAA Division I tournament runner up. In 2008 the Dragons were ranked 15th and reached the Colonial Tournament finals before losing 10–9 in overtime to Hofstra.

In 2007, Drexel lacrosse defeated University of Virginia, ranked number one at the time and the defending National Champion, Drexel's first victory over a number one ranked Division I team in any sport. Drexel's 1998 lacrosse squad finished the year with a then school record of twelve wins against two defeats. The season included a 14 to 10 defeat of a top 20 team, Towson University, eleven straight wins to start the season and a number 19 ranking. This win total has since been eclipsed by the 2008 lacrosse team which had 13 victories. In 72 seasons, Drexel has had 44 lacrosse All-Americans since beginning the sport in 1941. Prior to 2014, Drexel had not appeared in the NCAA Division I Men's Lacrosse Championship, but the team did get an invitation to the 1972 and 1973 USILA small college tournament.

=== Women's lacrosse ===
Women's lacrosse completed 2011 with their first ever Colonial Tournament appearance after a fourth place conference finish. The season included a total of three Colonial conference wins, the most since 2007. Charlotte Wood in 2011 was the first Drexel women's lacrosse player to be named to the Tewaaraton Trophy award list, which is composed of the top lacrosse players from all three collegiate divisions.

In 41 seasons, Drexel has an all-time record of 282 wins, 351 losses and 3 ties, with four straight NCAA tournament appearances (2021-2022-2023-2024).

=== Women's Ultimate Frisbee ===
The team competes in tournaments and scrimmages.

=== Rifle ===
Drexel fielded both men's and women's rifle teams from 1919 through 2003, when the program was shut down by the administration due to public safety concerns, a lack of leadership, and the need for expensive renovations to the rifle range. The women's rifle team won National Championships in 1947, 1949, 1950, 1952, and 1954.

=== Rowing ===
Drexel has also had success participating in the Dad Vail Regatta, the largest regular intercollegiate rowing event in the US, held on the Schuylkill River. At the 2000 Dad Vail, Drexel placed second in the Men's Second Varsity 8 event. Their rowing teams have won gold medals in the 1997 Men's Frosh/Novice and Men's JV Eight, silver in the 2000 Men's JV Eight, as well as bronze in the 2005 Women's Varsity Heavyweight Eight. The 2005 Women's Varsity Heavyweight Eight participated in the Women's Henley Regatta competing for the Jeffries Cup. However they were eliminated in the first round of duals by Neptune Rowing Club of Ireland.

Recently, the Drexel Rowing program has made significant strides in the rowing community. In the 2010 spring season at the Dad Vail Regatta, the Men's Second Varsity eight and the Men's Varsity pair took gold medals; while the Men's Freshman eight came across the line with a silver medal. The Women's Varsity eight placed third overall and the Women's Second Varsity eight finished just shy of a medal in fourth. The Women's Varsity eight then continued their success a few weeks later at the Royal Henley Woman's Regatta on the Thames River in England, finishing in first place to claim the Elite 8 championship title and the Sports Council Cup.

=== Rugby ===
In 2009, the Drexel women's rugby team won the National Women's Collegiate Division IV championship in 2009, and was runner-up at the Division III championship in 2010.

In 1988, the men's rugby team won the National Collegiate Sports Festival rugby championship.

=== Shotokan Karate ===
From 1988 through 2004, Drexel won eleven National Collegiate Karate Association team kata and kumite championships.

=== Soccer ===
Drexel has one major National Championship to its credit. In 1958 with a 12–0–0 record, coached by United Soccer Coaches Hall of Fame member Donald Y. Yonker, the men's soccer team was awarded the national title by the Intercollegiate Soccer Football Association of America, then the governing body of men's college soccer. This occurred the year before the NCAA instituted a playoff system and so Drexel's championship is not officially recognized today by the NCAA. The 1963 men's soccer team at 10–3–1 and the 1972 team at 9–5–0, subsequently earned NCAA tournament berths. Men's soccer has a Division I Record of 448–356–78 in 60 seasons.

Drexel won the CAA regular season title in 2007, finishing at 11–5–3 in a tie for first with Old Dominion and reaching then CAA tournament semifinals. It also won the CAA regular season outright in 2012, finishing 12–4–3 and earning the program's first NCAA tournament berth since 1972.

Drexel Soccer alumni Jeff Parke played 10 years of professional soccer, most recently for Major League Soccer's D.C. United in 2014.

In 2013, Drexel soccer won the CAA tournament, earning the conference's No. 1 seed for the first time, and also again earning an NCAA tournament berth. Drexel lost to Old Dominion 5–1 in the NCAA's first round.

- All Time Record – 448 wins, 356 losses, 78 ties
- Tournament Appearances – 4

=== Squash ===
Squash is an emerging sport at Drexel University, with the men's and women's varsity squash program established in 2011. The men's club team was founded in 2005 by Evan Cyrkin and Justin Burkholder and the women's by Violetta Shubayeva in 2007. Both, the Drexel Men's and Women's Squash teams, compete in the intercollegiate circuit (governed by the College Squash Association) as well as the Philadelphia Squash Racquets Association. On April 25, 2011, the Drexel Athletics Director, Dr. Eric Zillmer, announced the addition of men's and women's squash as varsity programs that will begin competing in the 2011–12 academic year. It was also announced that former world number 1 John White will lead both the men's and women's programs as head coach.

The Drexel Squash Club also has strong ties through volunteer work with Squash Smarts, a Philadelphia Youth Enrichment Program, which combines the sport of squash with academic tutoring and mentoring of under-served urban youth, in order to develop self-esteem and discipline through academic, athletic and personal achievement.

=== Track and field ===
The school's men's track and field team was formed in 1898. It was disbanded in 1952 but then was officially re-instated in 1970. The women's track program began in 1993. All track and field teams were cut in 1998 due to budgetary reasons, but there is a Drexel Running Club that competes in NIRCA championships.

=== Wrestling ===
In Wrestling, Coach Jack Childs became just the fifth coach in NCAA history to reach 500 career wins, spending more than 30 years at Drexel. Childs coached the school's first NCAA All-American in 2004 when Rob Rebmann placed 7th at the NCAA Tournament. In 2013, Drexel's wrestling team joined the Eastern Intercollegiate Wrestling Association after the CAA ceased sponsorship of the sport.

=== Golf ===
In 2016, Chris Crawford qualified for the 2016 U.S. Open, becoming the first Drexel golfer to qualify for the tournament.

=== Football ===
Drexel fielded a football team from 1895 to 1973, with the sport being discontinued after the 1973 season in order to increase funding for other sports teams. In 1927, Drexel hired Walter Halas as their coach for football, basketball, and baseball. Halas had been a backfield coach under Knute Rockne and George Gipp at Notre Dame, and his younger brother was the Hall of Fame coach and founder of the Chicago Bears George Halas. In Halas's second year as coach in 1928, the team won eight out of nine games.

Since 2005, the name "The Drexel Football Team" has been used by the universities comedy improv team whose proper name is The Drexel Football Comedy Improv Team. Members of the former Drexel Football Team have on occasion visited the university to attend the new team's shows, even vocally praising the team for continuing its legacy in a new and creative way.

=== Cricket ===
Drexel University Club Cricket is an NCCA Division 1 team that was the runner up in the 2015 edition of American College Cricket. It also won the Mid-Atlantic regionals in 2015 and 2017. Since the tournament became defunct after 2023, they currently participate in the NCCA National College Championship.

== Notable athletes ==
Basketball

- Drexel basketball teams have included both locally and nationally known players such as Michael Anderson and Malik Rose. Besides Rose and Anderson, the only other Drexel alumnus to play in the NBA is Damion Lee. Several other Drexel alumni have been drafted by NBA teams including: Randy Burkert (9th round of 1982 draft by Philadelphia 76ers), Rich Congo (7th round of 1984 draft by Philadelphia 76ers), Michael Mitchell (9th round of 1984 draft by Philadelphia 76ers), and Len Hatzenbeller (8th round of the 1981 draft by the Indiana Pacers).
- Nicole Hester – 2008 Philadelphia Sports Writers Association "Most Courageous" Award
- Gabriela Mărginean – 2009 Philadelphia Sports Writers Association "Outstanding Amateur Athlete"
- In March 2012, Bashir Mason, a four-year starter on the men's basketball team was named the 18th head coach of the Wagner Seahawks basketball team. At the time of the announcement, this made Bashir Mason the youngest head coach in the NCAA at 28 years of age.

Football

- Fox Stanton was football captain at Drexel in 1892 as a freshman and later went on to have a successful coaching career
- Jim Ostendarp played for two seasons on the football team from 1946 to 1947 and later went on to play for the New York Giants and become head coach at Amherst College for 33 years

Field hockey

- Head Coach Denise Zelenak was a member and captain of the United States Women's Indoor Field Hockey Team, leading them to a silver medal in the Pan American games. After retiring as a player she was named head coach in 2011.

Lacrosse

- Former Drexel lacrosse head coach Chris Bates played professionally for the Philadelphia Wings tallying 29 goals and 49 assists in 73 games, winning NLL championships in 1994, 1995 and 1998 with the club, and making the All-Pro team in 1996. In 2009, Bates was named head lacrosse coach at Princeton University, replacing legendary coach Bill Tierney.
- Scott Stewart, who played one year of lacrosse at Drexel and graduated in 2001, was the third overall pick in the 2001 NLL draft and had tabulated 151 goals with 162 assists in his career through 2012. Also Jeff Spano, another 2001 graduate, played professionally from 2003 to 2008 with the Philadelphia Wings and the New York Titans, accumulating 28 goals and 78 assists for 106 points in 80 games.
- Robert Church was the fifth overall selection in the 2013 NLL entry draft.
- Ben McIntosh was the first overall selection in the 2013 Western Lacrosse Association Draft.

Rowing

- In the sport of rowing, Mark Gerban (who swam for Drexel) was the first person in history to represent Palestine at the 2005 World Championships in Gifu Prefecture, Japan. Competing in the Lightweight Men's Single, he also had the highest placed World Championship finish (16th) of a Palestinian Athlete in any sport.

Soccer

- Jeff Parke was drafted by the Major League Soccer MetroStars in 2004 and won U.S. Open Cups with Seattle in 2010 and 2011.

Swimming & diving

- In 2008, Kate Hynes became Drexel's first women's swimming & diving All-American when she placed 13th on the three-meter board at the NCAA Swimming & Diving Championships. On the one-meter board, Hynes finished 20th at the national championships.

In general

- Other notable athletes include Lynn B. Ferguson, who was an All-American in both football and lacrosse during his time at Drexel; as well as Dennis Fink who earned the university's first-ever Division I All-America honor for lacrosse, was the first Drexel player to lead the nation in scoring, and currently remains among the all-time leaders in several NCAA Men's Division I Lacrosse Records categories. Also, Ray Greene who played on one of the first Drexel lacrosse teams is one of only two Dragons in the National Lacrosse Hall of Fame.

== Mascot ==
Mario the Magnificent is the mascot of Drexel University’s athletic teams. The mascot is named after Mario V. Mascioli, a member of Drexel’s Class of 1945 who was known for regularly attending Drexel athletic events for more than two decades. Mario appears at athletics competitions and other university events, where the mascot supports teams, participates in halftime and timeout entertainment, and takes part in campus activities.

== Traditions ==
The Drexel Fight Song was written by Gay V. Piercy 1939 and Todd Groo 1941 and first appeared in print in a 1938 edition of the Drexel Athletic News. In the 1950s, the song was recorded by the Drexel Bands and combined Glee Clubs; this recording was lost but rediscovered in 2006, sparking a revival of its use.

The DAC Pack is the student cheering section for men's and women's basketball games at Drexel University. "DAC" refers to the Daskalakis Athletic Center, the arena in which the men's and women's home games are played. Founded in 2002, the DAC Pack has grown from 10 people its first year, to a group that consistently fills the sideline and baseline student seating areas at home games. The DAC Pack also funds and organizes the annual Midnight Madness concert event to kick off the season. Previous performers at Midnight Madness have included Dev, and rap-duo Chiddy Bang. In addition to filling the stands for home games, the DAC Pack also organizes road trips for away games, such as at rivals Penn and Delaware, as well as the CAA tournament in Richmond, Virginia.

For the 2011–2012 basketball season, the DAC Pack was named one of the top 16 student sections in the country as a semi-finalist in the national Naismith Student Section of the Year Award. Additionally, the DAC Pack was picked as the top student section in Philadelphia.

== See also ==
- Eddie Burke
- City 6
- Bill Herrion
- Lacrosse in Pennsylvania
- Philadelphia Sports Hall of Fame
