= Drexel Dragons men's lacrosse =

- Founded: 1941; 85 years ago
- University: Drexel University
- Athletic director: Maisha Kelly
- Head coach: Brian Voelker (11th season)
- Stadium: Vidas Field (capacity: 1,500)
- Location: Philadelphia, Pennsylvania
- Conference: Colonial Athletic Association
- Past conferences: Middle Atlantic Conference; East Coast Conference; America East Conference
- All-time record: 468–490–3 (.489)
- Nickname: Dragons
- Colors: Navy blue and gold

NCAA Tournament Quarterfinals
- 2014

NCAA Tournament appearances
- (4) NCAA - 2014, 2021; USILA – 1972, 1973

Conference Tournament championships
- 2014, 2021

Conference regular season championships
- (5) - 2014, 2008, 2007; 1978 (ECC), 1956 (Penn-Del Lacrosse League)

The Drexel Dragons men's lacrosse team represents Drexel University in National Collegiate Athletic Association (NCAA) Division I men's lacrosse. Drexel currently competes as a member of the Colonial Athletic Association (CAA) and plays its home games at Vidas Field in Philadelphia, Pennsylvania. Drexel made its first NCAA tournament appearance in 2014, and a second NCAA tournament appearance in 2021.

== History ==
Lacrosse was established at Drexel in 1941 under coach Maury McMains. At the time, the university was known as Drexel Institute of Technology. Drexel's first USILA All-American was Ray Greene, who after serving in World War II transferred to Johns Hopkins, where he became a Hall of Fame midfielder. Drexel's 1947 schedule included games against Syracuse, Johns Hopkins, Virginia, Penn State and Penn.

Through the 1950s, highlights included Drexel reaching as high as number six in the standings in 1952, finishing the year with a five and two record. In 1953, Dick Young achieved first-team All-American honors at midfield. Drexel in 1958 completed the season with an 8 and 2 record, including a win over a Lehigh team who would go on to win the "Class C" lacrosse national title the following year.

In 1967, Drexel lacrosse aligned with the Middle Atlantic Conference and in 1975 the East Coast Conference. During this era, Lynn Ferguson, a two-time All-American midfielder, was named an All-American in both football and lacrosse in the same year. Drexel reached the small college USILA tournaments in both 1972 and 1973, with records of 11–3 and 9–4, respectively. The 1972 season also included a 14 to 6 win over the innovative Morgan State Bears lacrosse team.

In 1978, Dennis Fink earned Drexel's first Division I All-America honor for lacrosse, was the first Drexel player to lead the nation in scoring with 98 points and currently ranks among the all-time leader in several College Lacrosse Records. Fink also led Drexel to their only ECC conference title, as well as a 10 and 2 record.

Drexel would later realign with the North Atlantic Conference (1992) and the America East Conference (1997) before settling in the Colonial Athletic Association in 2002.

The 1998 men's lacrosse squad won eleven straight to begin the season, finished with twelve wins against two defeats, including a 14 to 10 defeat of top 20 Towson University, and a number 19 national ranking. In 2007, Drexel lacrosse defeated University of Virginia, ranked number one at the time and the defending National Champion, Drexel's first victory over a number one ranked Division I team in any sport.

In 2008 the Dragons set a school record with 13 wins, ranking as high as 10th in the nation and reaching the Colonial Tournament finals before losing 10–9 in overtime to Hofstra, narrowly missing out on an NCAA tournament bid. In 2010, the team reached their highest ever national ranking at number 7 in the nation following a win over then number three Notre Dame, the eventual NCAA Division I tournament runner up.

In 2014, Drexel scored in the third overtime as the Dragons came back from a three-goal deficit with five minutes to go in the game, to defeat Hofstra 11–10, win its first Colonial Athletic Association championship and earn their first NCAA tournament berth in lacrosse. In the first round of the tournament, the Dragons eliminated fourth seeded Penn by a score of 16–11. The highlight of the game was three consecutive goals by Drexel in a span of just over 11 seconds at the end of the first half. The Dragons moved on to the quarterfinals where they lost to Denver 15–6 at Delaware Stadium. Drexel was the first Pennsylvania based Division I college team to advance past the first round of the NCAAs since Penn reached the Final Four in 1988.

Prior to 2014, Drexel had not appeared in any NCAA Lacrosse Tournaments, though the team did get invitations to the 1972 and 1973 USILA small college tournaments, and since then, they did make the 2021 NCAA Tournament.

Drexel has had 46 lacrosse All-Americans since beginning the sport in 1941.

In 82 seasons, Drexel has an all-time record of 468 wins, 490 losses and 3 ties, 961 total games, .489 winning percentage through the 2024 season.

== Notable athletes and coaches ==
- Walter "Sonny" Bajkowski: Ranked 20th all-time in Division II total points for a season (36 goals, 60 assists, 96 points in 14 games) and 16th all-time in points-per-game for a season (6.86 ppg for 14 games) in 1972, Boy's Latin graduate.
- Chris Bates: Former head coach who played for the Philadelphia Wings, winning NLL titles in 1994, 1995 and 1998, and making the All-Pro team in 1996. In 2009, Bates was named head lacrosse coach at Princeton University, replacing Bill Tierney. Bates led Drexel to 13–4 record in 2008 and the CAA finals, and in 2007 led Drexel to an upset over defending champion UVA.
- Reid Bowering: The second overall selection in the 2020 NLL entry draft. Tied for the all-time lead in goals scored at Drexel. Led Drexel to the NCAA tournament and was named All American in 2021.
- Robert Church: The fifth overall selection in the 2013 NLL entry draft, fourth all time in Drexel lacrosse scoring, team was 37-23 during Church's time there, reaching the CAA Finals in 2012, Church was named All American in 2013. Church won National Lacrosse Leagues titles in 2015, 2016 and 2018 with the Rush, with over 900 career points in the NLL.
- Mitch de Snoo: Drafted in the second round (13th overall) of the 2015 NLL Entry Draft by the Calgary Roughnecks. Key player on Drexel's NCAA tournament quarterfinals team, de Snoo made the 2019 and 2016 NLL finals. He was also named the 2022 NLL Defensive Player of the Year.
- Lynn B. Ferguson: a Midfielder, was named an All-American in both football and lacrosse while at Drexel, a Lower Merion graduate.
- Dennis Fink: Earned Drexel's first NCAA Division I All-America honor for lacrosse. Fink is the only Drexel player to lead the nation in scoring and is among the leaders in single season points per game with 98 points in 12 games for an 8.17 per game average, and is second in assists-per-game in a season (63 assists in 12 games for a 5.25 per game average), accomplished in 1978.
- Ray Greene: Played on one of the first Drexel lacrosse teams and selected first-team All-American in 1943. Transferred to Johns Hopkins after serving during WWII, leading Hopkins to two USILA national titles. Greene was elected to the National Lacrosse Hall of Fame in 1981.
- Tom Hayes: Former Drexel head coach who also coached for many years at Rutgers, elected to the National Lacrosse Hall of Fame in 1989. Led Drexel to two USILA college tournament bids.
- Zach Manns: 2nd round pick in the 2019 NLL entry draft. Played in 2017 and 2018 for Drexel, made the decision to go professional. Manns won the Western Lacrosse Association Most Valuable Player in 2023. He is currently teamed with fellow Drexel alum Robert Church playing for the Saskatchewan Rush.
- Ben McIntosh: The first overall selection in the 2013 Western Lacrosse Association draft, as well as the first overall selection in the 2014 National Lacrosse League draft. Named 2015 NLL Rookie of the Year. Led Drexel to their first CAA championship, first NCAA tournament berth in lacrosse and only NCAA Quarterfinals appearance. McIntosh was named to the All World Team in the 2018 World Lacrosse Championships. He won National Lacrosse Leagues titles in 2015, 2016 and 2018 with the Rush.
- Jeff Spano: 2001 graduate who played professionally from 2002 to 2006 with the Philadelphia Wings and the New York Titans, with 28 goals and 78 assists for 106 points in 81 games.
- Scott Stewart: The 3rd overall pick in the 2001 NLL draft, accumulating 151 goals with 162 assists for 313 points over a ten-year NLL career.
- Brian Voelker: Current head coach, elected to the National Lacrosse Hall of Fame in 2015, All American defenseman with Johns Hopkins. Also was head coach at Penn.

== Annual record ==
| Year | Wins | Losses | Ties | Percent | Conference | Playoffs | National Rank | RPI | SOS | Power Rating ^{(1)} |
|---|---|---|---|---|---|---|---|---|---|---|
| 2024 | 6 | 9 | 0 | .400 | 4th | CAA Semifinals | | 41 | 34 | 47 |
| 2023 | 8 | 6 | 0 | .571 | 2nd | CAA Semifinals | | 40 | 50 | 42 |
| 2022 | 6 | 8 | 0 | .429 | 4th | CAA Semifinals | | 42 | 48 | 44 |
| 2021 | 10 | 3 | 0 | .769 | 2nd | CAA Title, NCAA First Round ^{(2)} | 12 | 12 | 27 | 16 |
| 2020 | 3 | 3 | 0 | .500 | | | | 34 | 36 | 26 |
| 2019 | 7 | 8 | 0 | .467 | 4th | CAA Finals ^{(3)} | | 28 | 22 | 26 |
| 2018 | 5 | 8 | 0 | .385 | 5th | | | 37 | 19 | 44 |
| 2017 | 6 | 8 | 0 | .429 | 4th | CAA Semifinals | | 33 | 21 | 36 |
| 2016 | 6 | 9 | 0 | .400 | 4th | CAA Semifinals | | 35 | 23 | 30 |
| 2015 | 7 | 8 | 0 | .467 | 2nd | CAA Semifinals | | 32 | 20 | 37 |
| 2014 | 13 | 5 | 0 | .722 | 1st | CAA Title, NCAA Quarterfinals ^{(4)} | 9 | 8 | 22 | 18 |
| 2013 | 11 | 4 | 0 | .733 | 2nd | CAA Semifinals | 18 | 18 | 30 | 24 |
| 2012 | 8 | 8 | 0 | .500 | 3rd | CAA Finals ^{(5)} | 18 | 17 | 9 | 17 |
| 2011 | 8 | 6 | 0 | .571 | 5th | | | 26 | 29 | 15 |
| 2010 | 10 | 5 | 0 | .667 | 3rd | CAA Semifinals | 13 | 20 | 25 | 14 |
| 2009 | 7 | 8 | 0 | .467 | 3rd | CAA Semifinals | | 35 | 40 | 34 |
| 2008 | 13 | 4 | 0 | .764 | 1st | CAA Finals ^{(6)} | 15 | 19 | 33 | 20 |
| 2007 | 11 | 5 | 0 | .688 | 1st | CAA Semifinals | 17 | 20 | 39 | 17 |
| 2006 | 5 | 9 | 0 | .357 | 5th | | | 39 | 33 | 30 |
| 2005 | 9 | 5 | 0 | .643 | 5th | | | 29 | 41 | 29 |
| 2004 | 4 | 9 | 0 | .310 | 5th | | | 43 | 39 | 36 |
| 2003 | 6 | 8 | 0 | .430 | 4th | CAA Semifinals | | | 31 | 37 |
| 2002 | 9 | 5 | 0 | .643 | 4th | | | | 30 | 32 |
| 2001 | 5 | 8 | 0 | .385 | 6th | | | | 36 | 35 |
| 2000 | 1 | 10 | 0 | .091 | 6th | | | | 32 | 44 |
| 1999 | 6 | 7 | 0 | .491 | 5th | | | | 37 | 36 |
| 1998 | 12 | 2 | 0 | .857 | 2nd | | 19 | | 41 | 25 |
| 1997 | 8 | 6 | 0 | .571 | 6th | | | | 41 | 38 |
| 1996 | 3 | 10 | 0 | .231 | | | | | | |
| 1995 | 7 | 8 | 0 | .467 | | | | | | |
| 1994 | 4 | 10 | 0 | .286 | | | | | | |
| 1993 | 6 | 7 | 0 | .462 | | | | | | |
| 1992 | 5 | 8 | 0 | .385 | | | | | | |
| 1991 | 4 | 9 | 0 | .308 | | | | | | |
| 1990 | 2 | 11 | 0 | .154 | | | | | | |
| 1989 | 3 | 10 | 0 | .231 | | | | | | |
| 1988 | 4 | 8 | 0 | .333 | | | | | | |
| 1987 | 4 | 9 | 0 | .308 | | | | | | |
| 1986 | 5 | 8 | 0 | .385 | | | | | | |
| 1985 | 6 | 7 | 0 | .462 | | | | | | |
| 1984 | 5 | 10 | 0 | .333 | | | | | | |
| 1983 | 4 | 8 | 0 | .333 | | | | | | |
| 1982 | 6 | 7 | 0 | .462 | | | | | | |
| 1981 | 4 | 7 | 0 | .364 | | | | | | |
| 1980 | 4 | 6 | 0 | .400 | | | | | | |
| 1979 | 8 | 4 | 0 | .667 | | | | | | |
| 1978 | 10 | 2 | 0 | .833 | 1st | ECC Title ^{(7)} | | | | |
| 1977 | 8 | 4 | 0 | .667 | | | | | | |
| 1976 | 5 | 6 | 0 | .455 | | | | | | |
| 1975 | 8 | 3 | 0 | .727 | | | | | | |
| 1974 | 8 | 4 | 0 | .667 | | | | | | |
| 1973 | 9 | 4 | 0 | .692 | | USILA First Round ^{(8)} | | | | |
| 1972 | 11 | 3 | 0 | .786 | | USILA First Round ^{(9)} | | | | |
| 1971 | 7 | 3 | 0 | .700 | | | | | | |
| 1970 | 4 | 7 | 0 | .364 | | | | | | |
| 1969 | 2 | 8 | 0 | .200 | | | | | | |
| 1968 | 1 | 8 | 0 | .111 | | | | | | |
| 1967 | 3 | 6 | 0 | .333 | | | | | | |
| 1966 | 1 | 8 | 0 | .111 | | | | | | |
| 1965 | 3 | 5 | 1 | .389 | | | | | | |
| 1964 | 5 | 4 | 0 | .556 | | | | | | |
| 1963 | 3 | 5 | 0 | .375 | | | | | | |
| 1962 | 3 | 5 | 0 | .375 | | | | | | |
| 1961 | 4 | 5 | 0 | .444 | | | | | | |
| 1960 | 6 | 4 | 0 | .600 | | | | | | |
| 1959 | 6 | 3 | 1 | .650 | | | | | | |
| 1958 | 8 | 2 | 0 | .800 | | | | | | |
| 1957 | 6 | 3 | 0 | .667 | | | | | | |
| 1956 | 7 | 2 | 0 | .778 | 1st | Penn-Del title ^{(10)} | | | | |
| 1955 | 3 | 5 | 0 | .375 | | | | | | |
| 1954 | 6 | 3 | 0 | .667 | | | | | | |
| 1953 | 4 | 4 | 0 | .500 | | | | | | |
| 1952 | 5 | 2 | 0 | .714 | | | | | | |
| 1951 | 5 | 3 | 0 | .625 | | | | | | |
| 1950 | 5 | 2 | 0 | .714 | | | | | | |
| 1949 | 5 | 2 | 0 | .714 | | | | | | |
| 1948 | 2 | 5 | 0 | .286 | | | | | | |
| 1947 | 0 | 13 | 1 | .036 | | | | | | |
| 1946 | 0 | 6 | 0 | .000 | | | | | | |
| 1945 | – | – | – | – | | | | | | |
| 1944 | – | – | – | – | | | | | | |
| 1943 | 3 | 4 | 0 | .429 ^{(11)} | | | | | | |
| 1942 | 4 | 4 | 0 | .500 | | | | | | |
| 1941 | 4 | 2 | 0 | .667 ^{(12)} | | | | | | |

^{(1)} LaxBytes / Laxpower / Lax Numbers Power Ratings / NCAA RPIs / Massey Ratings / Lacrosse Reference
^{(2)} Won CAA tournament finals over Hofstra 15–11. Lost to Notre Dame 10–8 in NCAA 1st Round
^{(3)} Lost CAA tournament finals 16–14 to Towson
^{(4)} Won CAA tournament finals in three overtimes over Hofstra 11–10. Defeated Penn 16–11 in NCAA 1st Round. Lost to Denver 15–6 in NCAA Quarterfinals
^{(5)} Lost CAA tournament finals 18–12 to Massachusetts
^{(6)} Lost CAA tournament finals 10–9 in overtime to Hofstra
^{(7)} Tied for 1st place in ECC with 3-1 record, with Bucknell and Delaware
^{(8)} Invited to post-season USILA small college tournament, lost to Towson 19-7
^{(9)} Invited to post-season USILA small college tournament, lost to Towson 17-6
^{(10)} Undefeated in Penn-Del Lacrosse League play
^{(11)} Unofficially, finished with a 3 and 4 record
^{(12)} In 1941, Drexel played 6 informal games, with a record of 4–2 The team was suspended in 1944 and 1945 due to World War II

== See also ==
- College men's lacrosse teams in the United States
- Lacrosse in Pennsylvania
