= 2018 Buffalo Bandits season =

2018 Buffalo Bandits
- League: NLL
- Division: 5th East
- 2018 record: 8–10
- Home record: 4–5
- Road record: 4–5
- Goals for: 232
- Goals against: 240
- General Manager: Steve Dietrich
- Coach: Troy Cordingley
- Captain: Steve Priolo
- Arena: KeyBank Center
- Average attendance: 14,181

Team leaders
- Goals: Mitch Jones (38)
- Assists: Dhane Smith (68)
- Points: Dhane Smith (105)
- Penalties in minutes: Steve Priolo (45)
- Loose Balls: Steve Priolo (138)
- Wins: Alex Buque (6)
- Goals against average: Alex Buque (12.94)

The Buffalo Bandits are a lacrosse team based in Buffalo, New York playing in the National Lacrosse League (NLL). The 2018 season was their 27th season in the NLL.

The Bandits held the first overall pick in the NLL Entry Draft, where they selected Josh Byrne with the first overall pick. They also selected Chase Fraser with the 13th pick. These players would be instrumental in the Bandits' contention window opening, which would lead to three straight titles between 2023 and 2025.

However, Buffalo finished the 2018 season with an 8–10 record, finishing last in the East for a second straight season, in addition to missing the playoffs. Despite a slim chance to make the playoffs near the end of the season, Buffalo lost three straight games to finish the season, ending their playoff hopes.

As of the 2026 season, this remains the most recent season in which the Bandits missed the playoffs or finished with a losing record.

== Regular season ==
=== Final standings ===
East Division
P	Team	GP	W	L	PCT	GB	Home	Road	GF	GA	Diff	GF/GP	GA/GP
1	Georgia Swarm – xy	18	11	7	.611	0.0	6–3	5–4	226	215	+11	12.56	11.94
2	Rochester Knighthawks – x	18	10	8	.556	1.0	5–4	5–4	236	210	+26	13.11	11.67
3	New England Black Wolves – x	18	9	9	.500	2.0	4–5	5–4	194	242	−48	10.78	13.44
4	Toronto Rock	18	8	10	.444	3.0	3–6	5–4	237	216	+21	13.17	12.00
5	Buffalo Bandits	18	8	10	.444	3.0	4–5	4–5	232	240	−8	12.89	13.33

West Division
P	Team	GP	W	L	PCT	GB	Home	Road	GF	GA	Diff	GF/GP	GA/GP
1	Saskatchewan Rush – xyz	18	14	4	.778	0.0	6–3	8–1	254	196	+58	14.11	10.89
2	Colorado Mammoth – x	18	11	7	.611	3.0	5–4	6–3	214	199	+15	11.89	11.06
3	Calgary Roughnecks – x	18	8	10	.444	6.0	5–4	3–6	227	211	+16	12.61	11.72
4	Vancouver Stealth	18	2	16	.111	12.0	0–9	2–7	186	277	−91	10.33	15.39

x: Clinched playoff berth; c: Clinched playoff berth by crossing over to another division; y: Clinched division; z: Clinched best regular season record; GP: Games Played
W: Wins; L: Losses; GB: Games back; PCT: Win percentage; Home: Record at Home; Road: Record on the Road; GF: Goals scored; GA: Goals allowed
Differential: Difference between goals scored and allowed; GF/GP: Average number of goals scored per game; GA/GP: Average number of goals allowed per game

=== Game log ===
Game	Date	Opponent	Location	Score	OT	Attendance	Record
1	December 8, 2017	Toronto Rock	KeyBank Center	W 13–9		11,516	1–0
2	December 23, 2017	@ Rochester Knighthawks	Blue Cross Arena	L 11–21		7,272	1–1
3	December 30, 2017	@ Toronto Rock	Air Canada Centre	L 13–20		9,398	1–2
4	January 6, 2018	Calgary Roughnecks	KeyBank Center	W 13–8		11,803	2–2
5	January 13, 2018	Vancouver Stealth	KeyBank Center	L 10–11	OT	12,610	2–3
6	January 19, 2018	@ Saskatchewan Rush	SaskTel Centre	W 16–15	OT	14,693	3–3
7	February 3, 2018	@ Rochester Knighthawks	Blue Cross Arena	W 16–14		9,425	4–3
8	February 9, 2018	@ New England Black Wolves	Mohegan Sun Arena	W 18–13		5,357	5–3
9	February 10, 2018	Georgia Swarm	KeyBank Center	W 18–9		14,058	6–3
10	February 24, 2018	Rochester Knighthawks	KeyBank Center	L 10–17		15,302	6–4
11	March 3, 2018	@ Colorado Mammoth	Pepsi Center	L 7–8		16,062	6–5
12	March 16, 2018	Saskatchewan Rush	KeyBank Center	L 10–16		12,936	6–6
13	March 18, 2018	@ Georgia Swarm	Infinite Energy Arena	L 10–14		3,863	6–7
14	March 23, 2018	@ New England Black Wolves	Mohegan Sun Arena	W 20–7		5,378	7–7
15	March 31, 2018	New England Black Wolves	KeyBank Center	W 14–11		13,709	8–7
16	April 14, 2018	@ Calgary Roughnecks	Scotiabank Saddledome	L 9–16		17,113	8–8
17	April 21, 2018	Toronto Rock	KeyBank Center	L 11–16		16,630	8–9
18	April 28, 2018	Rochester Knighthawks	KeyBank Center	L 13–15		19,070	8–10

== Roster ==
Buffalo Bandits roster
Active (21-man) roster		Inactive roster	Coaches
Goaltenders: 27 (Canada) Alex Buque; 65 (Canada) Davide DiRuscio; Defensemen: 0 (United States) Ryan Wagner; 4 (Canada) Ethan Schott; 12 (Canada) Mitch de Snoo; 15 (Canada) Matthew Bennett; 21 (Canada) Justin Martin; 23 (Canada) Steve Priolo (A); (Canada) Reid Acton	Forwards: 95 (Canada) Chase Fraser; 9 (Canada) Mark Steenhuis; 22 (Canada) Josh Byrne; 24 (Canada) Mitch Jones; 88 (Canada) Craig England; 98 (Canada) Callum Crawford; 92 (Canada) Dhane Smith; 78 (Canada) Jordan Durston; Transition: 8 (Canada) Kevin Brownell; 20 (Canada) Nick Weiss; 23 (Canada) Thomas Hoggarth	Injured reserve: (Canada) Vaughn Harris	Head coach {{{Head Coach}}} Legend: * Suspended list; (C) Captain; (A) Alternate captain; Roster updated 2017-12-08; NLL Transactions

=== Entry Draft ===
The 2017 NLL Entry Draft took place on September 18, 2017. The Bandits made the following selections:

Round	Overall	Player	College/Club
1	1	Josh Byrne	
2	13	Chase Fraser	
2	20	Ethan Schott	
3	33	Dallas Bridle	
4	34	Mackenzie Mitchell	
4	36	Connor Laird	
5	43	Dylan Molloy	
6	51	Braden Wallace	

== Player stats ==
=== Runners (Top 10) ===
Player	GP	G	A	Pts	LB	PIM
Dhane Smith	18	37	68	105	95	0
Mitch Jones	18	38	43	81	116	8
Jordan Durston	18	24	41	65	79	15
Josh Byrne	18	26	37	63	72	9
Callum Crawford	9	18	22	40	29	16
Vaughn Harris	14	18	14	32	105	6
Shawn Evans	8	16	16	32	42	8
Nick Weiss	18	9	13	22	114	23
Craig England	14	9	11	20	29	25
Steve Priolo	18	3	16	19	138	45
Totals		232	341	573	1,416	287

=== Goaltenders ===
Player	GP	MIN	W	L	GA	Sv%	GAA
Alex Buque	18	709:41	6	6	153	.771	12.94
Zach Higgins	16	373:23	2	4	81	.758	13.02
Davide DiRuscio	2	0:31	0	0	1	.000	116.13
Totals		1,083:35	8	10	235	.766	13.01

== See also ==
- 2018 NLL season
