= 2018 Saskatchewan Rush season =

2018 Saskatchewan Rush
- NLL Champions
- West Division Champions
- League: NLL
- Division: 1st West
- 2018 record: 14–4
- Home record: 6–3
- Road record: 8–1
- Goals for: 254
- Goals against: 196
- General Manager: Derek Keenan
- Coach: Derek Keenan
- Captain: Chris Corbeil
- Alternate captains: Brett Mydske; Kyle Rubisch
- Arena: SaskTel Centre
- Average attendance: 14,639

Team leaders
- Goals: Robert Church (47)
- Assists: Mark Matthews (84)
- Points: Mark Matthews (116)
- Penalties in minutes: Jeremy Thompson (26)
- Loose Balls: Jeremy Thompson (164)
- Wins: Evan Kirk (12)
- Goals against average: Tyler Carlson (9.33)

The Saskatchewan Rush are a lacrosse team based in Saskatoon, Saskatchewan playing in the National Lacrosse League (NLL). The 2018 season was the 13th in franchise history, and the 3rd in Saskatchewan. Originally they played in Edmonton. In 2018, they won their 3rd title in four years.

== Current standings ==
East Division
P	Team	GP	W	L	PCT	GB	Home	Road	GF	GA	Diff	GF/GP	GA/GP
1	Georgia Swarm – xy	18	11	7	.611	0.0	6–3	5–4	226	215	+11	12.56	11.94
2	Rochester Knighthawks – x	18	10	8	.556	1.0	5–4	5–4	236	210	+26	13.11	11.67
3	New England Black Wolves – x	18	9	9	.500	2.0	4–5	5–4	194	242	−48	10.78	13.44
4	Toronto Rock	18	8	10	.444	3.0	3–6	5–4	237	216	+21	13.17	12.00
5	Buffalo Bandits	18	8	10	.444	3.0	4–5	4–5	232	240	−8	12.89	13.33

West Division
P	Team	GP	W	L	PCT	GB	Home	Road	GF	GA	Diff	GF/GP	GA/GP
1	Saskatchewan Rush – xyz	18	14	4	.778	0.0	6–3	8–1	254	196	+58	14.11	10.89
2	Colorado Mammoth – x	18	11	7	.611	3.0	5–4	6–3	214	199	+15	11.89	11.06
3	Calgary Roughnecks – x	18	8	10	.444	6.0	5–4	3–6	227	211	+16	12.61	11.72
4	Vancouver Stealth	18	2	16	.111	12.0	0–9	2–7	186	277	−91	10.33	15.39

x: Clinched playoff berth; c: Clinched playoff berth by crossing over to another division; y: Clinched division; z: Clinched best regular season record; GP: Games Played
W: Wins; L: Losses; GB: Games back; PCT: Win percentage; Home: Record at Home; Road: Record on the Road; GF: Goals scored; GA: Goals allowed
Differential: Difference between goals scored and allowed; GF/GP: Average number of goals scored per game; GA/GP: Average number of goals allowed per game

== Game log ==
=== Regular season ===
Game	Date	Opponent	Location	Score	OT	Attendance	Record
1	December 16, 2017	@ Toronto Rock	Air Canada Centre	W 17–9		8,624	1–0
2	December 23, 2017	New England Black Wolves	SaskTel Centre	W 24–11		14,344	2–0
3	January 6, 2018	@ Georgia Swarm	Infinite Energy Arena	W 13–9		3,714	3–0
4	January 13, 2018	@ Colorado Mammoth	Pepsi Center	W 17–12		11,085	4–0
5	January 19, 2018	Buffalo Bandits	SaskTel Centre	L 15–16	OT	14,693	4–1
6	January 27, 2018	@ Calgary Roughnecks	Scotiabank Saddledome	W 13–12	OT	11,196	5–1
7	February 2, 2018	@ Colorado Mammoth	Pepsi Center	W 13–10		12,740	6–1
8	February 3, 2018	Vancouver Stealth	SaskTel Centre	W 11–9		14,387	7–1
9	February 10, 2018	@ Vancouver Stealth	Langley Events Centre	W 16–9		4,113	8–1
10	February 17, 2018	@ Rochester Knighthawks	Blue Cross Arena	L 11–16		6,188	8–2
11	February 24, 2018	Calgary Roughnecks	SaskTel Centre	W 10–6		15,075	9–2
12	March 3, 2018	Vancouver Stealth	SaskTel Centre	W 16–10		14,057	10–2
13	March 16, 2018	@ Buffalo Bandits	KeyBank Center	W 16–10		12,936	11–2
14	March 24, 2018	Rochester Knighthawks	SaskTel Centre	L 10–13		14,811	11–3
15	April 7, 2018	Colorado Mammoth	SaskTel Centre	W 11–8		14,971	12–3
16	April 13, 2018	@ Vancouver Stealth	Langley Events Centre	W 20–10		3,523	13–3
17	April 14, 2018	Georgia Swarm	SaskTel Centre	L 10–16		14,745	13–4
18	April 28, 2018	Calgary Roughnecks	SaskTel Centre	W 11–10		14,671	14–4

=== Playoffs ===
Game	Date	Opponent	Location	Score	OT	Attendance	Record
Western division final	May 13, 2018	Calgary Roughnecks	SaskTel Centre	W 15–13		11,568	1–0
finals (game 1)	May 26, 2018	Rochester Knighthawks	SaskTel Centre	W 16–9		11,842	2–0
finals (game 2)	June 2, 2018	@ Rochester Knighthawks	Blue Cross Arena	L 8–13		9,174	2–1
finals (game 3)	June 9, 2018	Rochester Knighthawks	SaskTel Centre	W 15–10		13,645	3–1

== Current roster ==
Saskatchewan Rush roster
Active (21-man) roster		Inactive roster	Coaches
Goaltenders: 31 (Canada) Adam Shute; 35 (Canada) Evan Kirk; 44 (Canada) Peter Dubenski; Defensemen: 79 (Canada) Nik Bilic; 24 (Canada) Ryan Dilks; 94 (Canada) Matt Hossack; 8 (Canada) Mike Messenger; 2 (Canada) Brett Mydske (A); 4 (Canada) Kyle Rubisch (A)	Forwards: 17 (Canada) Robert Church; 32 (Canada) Matthew Dinsdale; 25 (Canada) Ryan Keenan; 9 (Canada) Curtis Knight; 42 (Canada) Mark Matthews (A); 90 (Canada) Ben McIntosh; 77 (Haudenosaunee) Jeff Shattler; Transition: 16 (Canada) Chris Corbeil (C); 13 (Canada) Jeff Cornwall; 7 (Canada) Tor Reinholdt; 72 (Canada) Adrian Sorichetti; 74 (Haudenosaunee) Jeremy Thompson	Practice squad: 61 (Canada) Nick Finlay (T); 10 (Canada) Johnny Pearson (F); 31 (Canada) Adam Shute (G); Injured reserve: 15 (Canada) Matt MacGrotty (D)	Head coach {{{Head Coach}}} Legend: * Suspended list; (C) Captain; (A) Alternate captain; Roster updated 2018-01-19; NLL Transactions

=== Entry Draft ===
The 2017 NLL Entry Draft took place on September 18, 2017. The Rush made the following selections:

Round	Overall	Player	College/Club
2	16	Nick Finlay	
2	19	Johnny Pearson	Ohio State
3	31	Chris Boushy	
4	41	Austin Murphy	Wingate
6	58	Anthony Hallborg	

=== Runners (Top 10) ===
Note: GP = Games played; G = Goals; A = Assists; Pts = Points; LB = Loose Balls; PIM = Penalty Minutes

Player	GP	G	A	Pts	LB	PIM
Mark Matthews	18	32	84	116	67	6
Robert Church	18	47	60	107	72	6
Ben McIntosh	18	46	34	80	70	17
Ryan Keenan	18	26	47	73	66	2
Jeff Shattler	17	24	36	60	76	8
Matthew Dinsdale	17	23	22	45	39	4
Curtis Knight	14	15	29	44	42	0
Adrian Sorichetti	18	7	8	15	64	6
Jeremy Thompson	18	6	9	15	164	26
Mike Messenger	18	8	4	12	92	117
Team Totals	18	254	391	645	1320	180

== See also ==
- 2018 NLL season
