= 2018 Toronto Rock season =

2018 Toronto Rock
- League: NLL
- Division: 4th East
- 2018 record: 8-10
- Home record: 3-6
- Road record: 5-4
- Goals for: 237
- Goals against: 216
- General Manager: Jamie Dawick
- Coach: Matt Sawyer
- Captain: Brodie Merrill
- Alternate captains: Sandy Chapman; Stephan Leblanc
- Arena: Air Canada Centre
- Average attendance: 9,700

Team leaders
- Goals: Adam Jones (37)
- Assists: Rob Hellyer (63)
- Points: Rob Hellyer (93)
- Penalties in minutes: Brock Sorensen (60)
- Loose Balls: Brad Kri (135)
- Wins: Nick Rose (8)
- Goals against average: Nick Rose (11.63)

The Toronto Rock are a lacrosse team based in Toronto playing in the National Lacrosse League (NLL). The 2018 season is the 21st in franchise history, and 20th as the Rock.

== Regular season ==
=== Finalstandings ===
East Division
P	Team	GP	W	L	PCT	GB	Home	Road	GF	GA	Diff	GF/GP	GA/GP
1	Georgia Swarm – xy	18	11	7	.611	0.0	6–3	5–4	226	215	+11	12.56	11.94
2	Rochester Knighthawks – x	18	10	8	.556	1.0	5–4	5–4	236	210	+26	13.11	11.67
3	New England Black Wolves – x	18	9	9	.500	2.0	4–5	5–4	194	242	−48	10.78	13.44
4	Toronto Rock	18	8	10	.444	3.0	3–6	5–4	237	216	+21	13.17	12.00
5	Buffalo Bandits	18	8	10	.444	3.0	4–5	4–5	232	240	−8	12.89	13.33

West Division
P	Team	GP	W	L	PCT	GB	Home	Road	GF	GA	Diff	GF/GP	GA/GP
1	Saskatchewan Rush – xyz	18	14	4	.778	0.0	6–3	8–1	254	196	+58	14.11	10.89
2	Colorado Mammoth – x	18	11	7	.611	3.0	5–4	6–3	214	199	+15	11.89	11.06
3	Calgary Roughnecks – x	18	8	10	.444	6.0	5–4	3–6	227	211	+16	12.61	11.72
4	Vancouver Stealth	18	2	16	.111	12.0	0–9	2–7	186	277	−91	10.33	15.39

x: Clinched playoff berth; c: Clinched playoff berth by crossing over to another division; y: Clinched division; z: Clinched best regular season record; GP: Games Played
W: Wins; L: Losses; GB: Games back; PCT: Win percentage; Home: Record at Home; Road: Record on the Road; GF: Goals scored; GA: Goals allowed
Differential: Difference between goals scored and allowed; GF/GP: Average number of goals scored per game; GA/GP: Average number of goals allowed per game

== Game log ==
=== Regular season ===
Game	Date	Opponent	Location	Score	OT	Attendance	Record
1	December 8, 2017	@ Buffalo Bandits	KeyBank Center	L 9–13		11,516	0–1
2	December 16, 2017	Saskatchewan Rush	Air Canada Centre	L 9–17		8,624	0–2
3	December 30, 2017	Buffalo Bandits	Air Canada Centre	W 20–13		9,398	1–2
4	January 6, 2018	@ Vancouver Stealth	Langley Events Centre	W 24–7		4,206	2–2
5	January 12, 2018	Rochester Knighthawks	Air Canada Centre	W 17–9		7,101	3–2
6	January 27, 2018	New England Black Wolves	Air Canada Centre	W 21–9		9,145	4–2
7	February 3, 2018	Calgary Roughnecks	Air Canada Centre	L 8–16		10,344	4–3
8	February 10, 2018	@ Rochester Knighthawks	Blue Cross Arena	W 12–9		5,439	5–3
9	February 17, 2018	@ Georgia Swarm	Infinite Energy Arena	L 13–14	OT	5,052	5–4
10	March 3, 2018	Georgia Swarm	Air Canada Centre	L 7–12		10,679	5–5
11	March 11, 2018	New England Black Wolves	Air Canada Centre	L 7–8		10,259	5–6
12	March 16, 2018	@ New England Black Wolves	Mohegan Sun Arena	W 14–9		5,832	6–6
13	March 24, 2018	@ Calgary Roughnecks	Scotiabank Saddledome	W 17–14		12,097	7–6
14	March 30, 2018	Colorado Mammoth	Air Canada Centre	L 7–11		10,288	7–7
15	April 8, 2018	@ Georgia Swarm	Infinite Energy Arena	L 10–11		4,496	7–8
16	April 13, 2018	Rochester Knighthawks	Air Canada Centre	L 11–14		11,463	7–9
17	April 21, 2018	@ Buffalo Bandits	KeyBank Center	W 16–11		16,630	8–9
18	April 28, 2018	@ Colorado Mammoth	Pepsi Center	L 15–19		15,787	8–10

== Roster ==
Toronto Rock roster
Active (21-man) roster		Inactive roster	Coaches
Goaltenders: 35 (Canada) Brandon Miller; 66 (Canada) Nick Rose; Defensemen: 2 (Canada) Drew Belgrave; 71 (Canada) Sheldon Burns; 5 (Canada) Sandy Chapman (A); 45 (Canada) Damon Edwards; 93 (Canada) Latrell Harris; 91 (Canada) Bill Hostrawser; 20 (Canada) Bradley Kri; 82 (Canada) Jordan Magnuson (D)	Forwards: 22 (Canada) Phil Caputo; 25 (Canada) Dan Craig; 10 (Canada) Rob Hellyer; 11 (Canada) Brett Hickey; 16 (Canada) Adam Jones; 17 (Canada) Stephan Leblanc (A); 41 (Canada) Dan Lintner; 6 (United States) Kieran McArdle; 97 (Canada) Reid Reinholdt; Transition: 23 (Canada) Challen Rogers; 3 (Canada) Brock Sorensen	Practice Squad: 1 (Canada) Riley Hutchcraft (G); 47 (Canada) Adam Jay (D); 27 (Canada) Darryl Robertson (D); 61 (Canada) Brandon Slade (D); Injured Reserve: 15 (Canada) Turner Evans (F); 37 (Canada) Brodie Merrill (C) (D); 26 (United States) Tom Schreiber (F); Holdout: 4 (Canada) Jesse Gamble (T); Protected list: 99 (United States) Paul Rabil (T)	Head Coach {{{Head Coach}}} Legend: * Suspended list; (C) Captain; (A) Alternate captain; Roster updated 2018-3-4; NLL Transactions

=== Entry Draft ===
The 2017 NLL Entry Draft took place on September 18, 2017. The Rock made the following selections:

Round	Overall	Player	College/Club
2	15	Drew Belgrave	
2	18	Zac Mason	
3	30	Riley Hutchcraft	
4	35	Alec Tulett	
4	40	Josh Jubenville	
5	49	Christian Burgdorf	
6	57	Daniel Craig	

== See also ==
- 2018 NLL season
