= 2018 NLL season =

- League: National Lacrosse League
- Sport: Indoor lacrosse (box lacrosse)
- Duration: December 8, 2017 – June 9, 2018
- Games: 18
- Teams: 9
- TV partner: B/R Live

Draft
- Top draft pick: Josh Byrne
- Picked by: Buffalo Bandits

Regular Season
- Top seed: Saskatchewan Rush
- Season MVP: Mark Matthews (Saskatchewan Rush)
- Top scorer: Mark Matthews (Saskatchewan Rush)

Playoffs
- Finals champions: Saskatchewan Rush (3rd title)
- Runners-up: Rochester Knighthawks
- Finals MVP: Jeff Shattler (Rush)

NLL seasons
- ← 2017 season 2019 season →

The 2018 National Lacrosse League season, also known as the 2017–18 season, was the 32nd season in NLL history. It began on December 8, 2017, and ending on June 9, 2018, with the Saskatchewan Rush winning their 3rd title in 4 years.

== Teams ==
2018 National Lacrosse League
| Division | Team | City | Arena | Capacity |
| East | Buffalo Bandits | Buffalo, New York | KeyBank Center | 19,070 |
| East | Georgia Swarm | Duluth, Georgia | Infinite Energy Arena | 10,500 |
| East | New England Black Wolves | Uncasville, Connecticut | Mohegan Sun Arena | 7,074 |
| East | Rochester Knighthawks | Rochester, New York | Blue Cross Arena | 10,662 |
| East | Toronto Rock | Toronto, Ontario | Air Canada Centre | 18,800 |
| West | Calgary Roughnecks | Calgary, Alberta | Scotiabank Saddledome | 19,289 |
| West | Colorado Mammoth | Denver, Colorado | Pepsi Center | 18,007 |
| West | Saskatchewan Rush | Saskatoon, Saskatchewan | SaskTel Centre | 15,195 |
| West | Vancouver Stealth | Langley, British Columbia | Langley Events Centre | 5,276 |

=== Map of teams ===
East Division West Division

== Final standings ==
East Division
| P | Team | GP | W | L | PCT | GB | Home | Road | GF | GA | Diff | GF/GP | GA/GP |
|---|---|---|---|---|---|---|---|---|---|---|---|---|---|
| 1 | Georgia Swarm – xy | 18 | 11 | 7 | .611 | 0.0 | 6–3 | 5–4 | 226 | 215 | +11 | 12.56 | 11.94 |
| 2 | Rochester Knighthawks – x | 18 | 10 | 8 | .556 | 1.0 | 5–4 | 5–4 | 236 | 210 | +26 | 13.11 | 11.67 |
| 3 | New England Black Wolves – x | 18 | 9 | 9 | .500 | 2.0 | 4–5 | 5–4 | 194 | 242 | −48 | 10.78 | 13.44 |
| 4 | Toronto Rock | 18 | 8 | 10 | .444 | 3.0 | 3–6 | 5–4 | 237 | 216 | +21 | 13.17 | 12.00 |
| 5 | Buffalo Bandits | 18 | 8 | 10 | .444 | 3.0 | 4–5 | 4–5 | 232 | 240 | −8 | 12.89 | 13.33 |

West Division
| P | Team | GP | W | L | PCT | GB | Home | Road | GF | GA | Diff | GF/GP | GA/GP |
|---|---|---|---|---|---|---|---|---|---|---|---|---|---|
| 1 | Saskatchewan Rush – xyz | 18 | 14 | 4 | .778 | 0.0 | 6–3 | 8–1 | 254 | 196 | +58 | 14.11 | 10.89 |
| 2 | Colorado Mammoth – x | 18 | 11 | 7 | .611 | 3.0 | 5–4 | 6–3 | 214 | 199 | +15 | 11.89 | 11.06 |
| 3 | Calgary Roughnecks – x | 18 | 8 | 10 | .444 | 6.0 | 5–4 | 3–6 | 227 | 211 | +16 | 12.61 | 11.72 |
| 4 | Vancouver Stealth | 18 | 2 | 16 | .111 | 12.0 | 0–9 | 2–7 | 186 | 277 | −91 | 10.33 | 15.39 |

x: Clinched playoff berth; c: Clinched playoff berth by crossing over to another division; y: Clinched division; z: Clinched best regular season record; GP: Games Played
W: Wins; L: Losses; GB: Games back; PCT: Win percentage; Home: Record at Home; Road: Record on the Road; GF: Goals scored; GA: Goals allowed
Differential: Difference between goals scored and allowed; GF/GP: Average number of goals scored per game; GA/GP: Average number of goals allowed per game

== Scoring leaders ==
Note: GP = Games played; G = Goals; A = Assists; Pts = Points; PIM = Penalty minutes; LB = Loose Balls

| Player | Team | GP | G | A | Pts | PIM | LB |
|---|---|---|---|---|---|---|---|
| Mark Matthews | Saskatchewan Rush | 18 | 33 | 84 | 116 | 6 | 67 |
| Robert Church | Saskatchewan Rush | 18 | 47 | 60 | 107 | 6 | 72 |
| Dhane Smith | Buffalo Bandits | 18 | 37 | 68 | 105 | 0 | 95 |
| Joe Resetarits | Rochester Knighthawks | 18 | 37 | 63 | 100 | 0 | 92 |
| Ryan Benesch | Colorado Mammoth | 18 | 36 | 57 | 93 | 6 | 96 |
| Rob Hellyer | Toronto Rock | 18 | 30 | 63 | 93 | 5 | 84 |
| Curtis Dickson | Calgary Roughnecks | 18 | 47 | 45 | 92 | 26 | 86 |
| Cody Jamieson | Rochester Knighthawks | 18 | 26 | 63 | 89 | 8 | 75 |
| Adam Jones | Toronto Rock | 18 | 37 | 52 | 89 | 9 | 109 |
| Lyle Thompson | Georgia Swarm | 18 | 46 | 40 | 86 | 6 | 123 |
| Wesley Berg | Calgary Roughnecks | 18 | 37 | 49 | 86 | 12 | 82 |

== Leading goaltenders ==
Note: GP = Games played; Mins = Minutes played; W = Wins; L = Losses: GA = Goals Allowed; SV% = Save Percentage; GAA = Goals against average

| Player | Team | GP | Mins | W | L | GA | SV% | GAA |
|---|---|---|---|---|---|---|---|---|
| Christian Del Bianco | Calgary Roughnecks | 18 | 788 | 7 | 6 | 138 | 0.793 | 10.50 |
| Evan Kirk | Saskatchewan Rush | 18 | 926 | 12 | 3 | 167 | 0.777 | 10.82 |
| Dillon Ward | Colorado Mammoth | 18 | 981 | 10 | 6 | 181 | 0.780 | 11.06 |
| Matt Vinc | Rochester Knighthawks | 18 | 960 | 9 | 6 | 182 | 0.781 | 11.37 |
| Nick Rose | Toronto Rock | 18 | 1016 | 8 | 9 | 197 | 0.781 | 11.63 |

== Playoffs ==
Division semifinals (Single elimination)
East Division
E2 | Rochester | 15
E3 | New England | 11
West Division
W2 | Colorado | 12
W3 | Calgary | 15

Division finals (Single elimination)
E1 | Georgia | 8
E2 | Rochester | 9
W1 | Saskatchewan | 15
W3 | Calgary | 13

Finals (Best-of-3)
E2 | Rochester | 1
W1 | Saskatchewan | 2

*Overtime

=== Conference Semifinals ===
==== (E2) Rochester Knighthawks vs. (E3) New England Black Wolves ====
| May 4, 2018 | Rochester Knighthawks | 15–11 (4–2, 7–2, 1–5, 3–2) | New England Black Wolves | Blue Cross Arena; Attendance: 5,263 |

Game reference

Matt Vinc
Goalies
Aaron Bold
Doug Jamieson

| Shanks (Smith, Withers) – 01:07 | 1–0 |
| Shanks (Gillies, Perroni – 04:00 | 2–0 |
| Jackson (Resetarits) – 04:22 | 3–0 |
| Shanks (Magnan, Vinc) – 07:38 | 4–0 |
| | 4–1 | 08:05 – Leblanc (O'Connor, Crowley) |
| | 4–2 | 10:19 – Crawford (Bomberry, Coyle) |
| Gillies (Withers) – 15:28 | 5–2 |
| | 5–3 | 15:42 – O'Connor (Powless, Crawford) |
| | 5–4 | 16:50 – Buchanan (Evans) |
| Fannell (Currier, Resetarits) – 17:27 | 6–4 |
| Jackson (Vitarelli) (PP) – 19:47 | 7–4 |
| Resetarits (Vitarelli) – 20:07 | 8–4 |
| Vitarelli (Magnan, Vinc) – 21:39 | 9–4 |
| Hossack (Jamieson) – 25:31 | 10–4 |
| Shanks (Resetarits, Jackson) – 29:46 | 11–4 |
| | 11–5 | 30:54 – Crawford (Crowley, Powless) |
| | 11–6 | 31:14 – Leblanc (Crowley, Buchanan) |
| | 11–7 | 32:45 – O'Connor (Brock) |
| | 11–8 | 37:52 – Crawford (Leblanc) |
| Resetarits (Currier) – 40:10 | 12–8 |
| | 12–9 | 40:47 – Bomberry |
| | 12–10 | 45:41 – Leblanc (Crowley) (SH) |
| Gillies – 49:42 | 13–10 |
| Vitarelli (Resetarits, Jamieson) – 50:53 | 14–10 |
| | 14–11 | 53:22 – O'Connor (Bomberry) |
| Gillies (ENG) – 57:03 | 15–11 |

0 min
Penalties
6 min
60
Shots
60

==== (W2) Colorado Mammoth vs. (W3) Calgary Roughnecks ====
| May 5, 2018 | Colorado Mammoth | 12–15 (3–1, 4–2, 2–6, 3–6) | Calgary Roughnecks | Pepsi Center; Attendance: 13,884 |

Game reference

Dillon Ward
Goalies
Christian Del Bianco

| | 0–1 | 01:27 – Dobbie (Berg, Cattoni) |
| Keogh (Benesch) – 02:55 | 1–1 |
| Benesch (Greer, Noble) – 03:58 | 2–1 |
| Ruest – 05:34 | 3–1 |
| Greer (Wardle, Keogh) – 16:59 | 4–1 |
| Downing – 17:33 | 5–1 |
| McLaughlin (Ruest) (SH) – 19:54 | 6–1 |
| | 6–2 | 21:23 – Dickson (Cattoni, Bell) |
| Noble (Benesch) (PP) – 26:45 | 7–2 |
| | 7–3 | 29:29 – Dobbie |
| | 7–4 | 31:28 – Berg (Loewen, Cattoni) |
| | 7–5 | 33:19 – Dobbie (Berg, Digby) |
| | 7–6 | 35:29 – Digby (Cattoni, Dobbie) (PP) |
| Greer (Ruest, Keogh) (PP) – 36:54 | 8–6 |
| | 8–7 | 40:20 – Berg (Dobbie, Cummings |
| | 8–8 | 41:01 – Dobbie (Dickson) |
| | 8–9 | 42:30 – Cattoni (Dobbie, Loewen) |
| Benesch (Ruest) – 44:50 | 9–9 |
| | 9–10 | 47:04 – Dickson (Digby, Berg) |
| Greer – 50:43 | 10–10 |
| Noble – 51:18 | 11–10 |
| | 11–11 | 52:09 – Dobbie (Cattoni, McIntosh) |
| Ruest (Benesch, McLaughlin) – 53:23 | 12–11 |
| | 12–12 | 55:35 – Dobbie (Loewen, Berg) |
| | 12–13 | 57:17 – Dickson (Digby, Berg) |
| | 12–14 | 59:37 – Dickson (Del Bianco) (ENG) |
| | 12–15 | 59:54 – Wilde (ENG) |

8 min
Penalties
6 min
50
Shots
46

=== Divisional Finals ===
==== (E1) Georgia Swarm vs. (E3) Rochester Knighthawks ====
| May 12, 2018 | Georgia Swarm | 8–9 (1–1, 1–1, 1–2, 5–5) | Rochester Knighthawks | Infinite Energy Arena; Attendance: 4,106 |

Game reference

Mike Poulin
Goalies
Matt Vinc

| | 0–1 | 07:30 – Jamieson (Resetarits) (PP) |
| M. Thompson (Staats, L. Thompson) (PP) – 10:44 | 1–1 |
| M. Thompson (Jackson, Hall) – 15:55 | 2–1 |
| | 2–2 | 29:04 – Jamieson |
| Staats (Jackson, L. Thompson) – 31:50 | 3–2 |
| | 3–3 | 32:12 – Jamieson (Vitarelli, Magnan) |
| | 3–4 | 41:53 – Currier (Withers, Magnan) |
| | 3–5 | 45:48 – Fannell (Resetarits, Jamieson) |
| Staats (M. Thompson, Jackson) – 46:44 | 4–5 |
| | 4–6 | 47:32 – Shanks (Magnan) |
| | 4–7 | 48:34 – Campbell (Llord, Dawson) |
| | 4–8 | 48:55 – Jackson (Shanks, Dawson) |
| M. Thompson (Staats, Jackson) – 50:20 | 5–8 |
| M. Thompson (Jackson, Staats) – 51:42 | 6–8 |
| L. Thompson (White, Poulin) – 52:15 | 7–8 |
| | 7–9 | 53:50 – Shanks (Jackson, Campbell) |
| Jackson (Sellars, Cole) – 57:50 | 8–9 |

8 min
Penalties
4 min
54
Shots
44

==== (W1) Saskatchewan Rush vs. (W3) Calgary Roughnecks ====
| May 13, 2018 | Saskatchewan Rush | 15–13 (4–2, 4–3, 4–4, 3–4) | Calgary Roughnecks | SaskTel Centre; Attendance: 11,568 |

Game reference

Evan Kirk
Goalies
Christian Del Bianco

| McIntosh (Keenan, Church) – 01:08 | 1–0 |
| Keenan (Church, Dinsdale) – 06:18 | 2–0 |
| | 2–1 | 07:19 – Dickson (Dobbie, Loewen) |
| Knight (Matthews) – 12:07 | 3–1 |
| | 3–2 | 13:04 – Dickson (Dobbie, Cattoni) |
| Church (Matthews) (PP) – 13:53 | 4–2 |
| Hossack (Matthews) – 16:34 | 5–2 |
| McIntosh (Matthews, Shattler) (PP) – 18:05 | 6–2 |
| | 6–3 | 18:52 – Berg (Digby) |
| Dilks – 19:07 | 7–3 |
| | 7–4 | 23:20 – Dickson (Cummings, Del Bianco) |
| | 7–5 | 24:20 – Berg (Dickson, Dobbie) |
| Matthews (Church) – 26:28 | 8–5 |
| | 8–6 | 32:51 – Cattoni (Dickson, Dobbie) (PP) |
| | 8–7 | 33:25 – Dickson (Dobbie, Loewen) |
| | 8–8 | 35:06 – Dobbie (Dickson) |
| Church (Dinsdale) – 36:19 | 9–8 |
| Shattler (McIntosh, Keenan) – 41:07 | 10–8 |
| Church (Dinsdale, McIntosh) – 42:29 | 11–8 |
| McIntosh (Matthews, Keenan) (PP) – 43:39 | 12–8 |
| | 12–9 | 44:59 – Berg (Dobbie, Cattoni) |
| Dinsdale (McIntosh, Thompson) – 47:55 | 13–9 |
| Matthews (Corbeil) – 48:56 | 14–9 |
| | 14–10 | 51:43 – Dickson (Dobbie) (PP) |
| | 14–11 | 53:31 – Dobbie (Berg, Cattoni) (PP) |
| Dilks (ENG) – 56:59 | 15–11 |
| | 15–12 | 57:55 – Dickson (Dobbie, Cattoni) |
| | 15–13 | 58:35 – Berg (Dobbie, Dickson) (PP) |

15 min
Penalties
8 min
60
Shots
46

=== NLL Final (best of three) ===
==== (W1) Saskatchewan Rush vs. (E2) Rochester Knighthawks ====
| May 26, 2018 | Saskatchewan Rush | 16–9 (2–2, 4–2, 5–2, 5–3) | Rochester Knighthawks | SaskTel Centre; Attendance: 11,842 |

Game reference

Evan Kirk
Goalies
Matt Vinc
Angus Goodleaf

| Thompson (Kirk) – 02:34 | 1–0 |
| | 1–1 | 07:10 – Hossack |
| | 1–2 | 10:47 – Shanks (Jackson, Fannell) |
| Cornwall (Messenger, Dilks) – 13:19 | 2–2 |
| McIntosh (Shattler, Knight) – 16:56 | 3–2 |
| | 3–3 | 18:51 – Resetarits (Jamieson) |
| | 3–4 | 19:40 – Jamieson (Resetarits) |
| Church (SH) – 22:05 | 4–4 |
| Church (Dinsdale) – 23:39 | 5–4 |
| Church – 25:08 | 6–4 |
| McIntosh (Cornwall) – 30:57 | 7–4 |
| Cornwall (Mydske) – 32:14 | 8–4 |
| Keenan (Dinsdale, Church) – 32:44 | 9–4 |
| Matthews (Hossack) – 33:39 | 10–4 |
| | 10–5 | 39:17 – Currier (Resetarits, Jamieson) (PP) |
| | 10–6 | 39:41 – Fannell (Jackson, Resetarits) |
| Dinsdale (Church) – 41:10 | 11–6 |
| Keenan (Dinsdale) – 47:08 | 12–6 |
| | 12–7 | 47:29 – Fannell (Jamieson, Currier) |
| | 12–8 | 48:31 – Vitarelli (Jamieson, Jackson) |
| Church (Dilks, Matthews) – 49:28 | 13–8 |
| | 13–9 | 50:46 – Jackson (Jamieson, Fannell) |
| Hossack (Thompson) – 52:06 | 14–9 |
| Messenger (Kirk) – 52:42 | 15–9 |
| Keenan (Dinsdale, Matthews) (PP) – 57:12 | 16–9 |

8 min
Penalties
16 min
64
Shots
44

| June 2, 2018 | Rochester Knighthawks | 13–8 (3–3, 5–1, 2–1, 3–3) | Saskatchewan Rush | Blue Cross Arena; Attendance: 9,174 |

Game reference

Matt Vinc
Goalies
Evan Kirk
Tyler Carlson

| | 0–1 | 00:50 – Church (McIntosh, Shattler) |
| | 0–2 | 03:32 – Shattler (Matthews, Church) |
| Currier (Fannell, Jackson – 07:38 | 1–2 |
| Hossack (Campbell) – 13:21 | 2–2 |
| Fannell (Currier) – 14:27 | 3–2 |
| | 3–3 | 14:56 – Keenan (McIntosh, Matthews) |
| Shanks (Dawson, Fannell) (SH) – 15:26 | 4–3 |
| Currier (Shanks) – 20:08 | 5–3 |
| Jamieson (Shanks, Currier) – 23:10 | 6–3 |
| Currier (Jamieson, Shanks) – 23:47 | 7–3 |
| | 7–4 | 24:42 – McIntosh (Shattler) |
| Vitarelli (Dawson, Fannell) – 27:42 | 8–4 |
| | 8–5 | 32:53 – Shattler (McIntosh, Matthews) |
| Jamieson (Campbell, Magnan) – 35:32 | 9–5 |
| Hossack – 37:30 | 10–5 |
| Currier (Brown, Vitarelli) | 11–5 |
| | 11–6 | 50:49 – Keenan (Matthews, Shattler) (PP) |
| Jackson (Jamieson, Resetarits) – 51:24 | 12–6 |
| | 12–7 | 52:15 – Shattler (Bilic) |
| Gillies (Llord) (ENG) – 57:40 | 13–7 |
| | 13–8 | 59:59 – Dawson (Church, Shattler) |

4 min
Penalties
10 min
53
Shots
55

| May 26, 2018 | Saskatchewan Rush | 15–10 (0–1, 6–3, 4–4, 5–2) | Rochester Knighthawks | SaskTel Centre; Attendance: 13,645 |

Game reference

Evan Kirk
Goalies
Matt Vinc

| | 0–1 | 14:16 – Currier (Fannell, Shanks) |
| Shattler (Keenan, Matthews) – 15:25 | 1–1 |
| McIntosh (Matthews, Thompson) – 18:05 | 2–1 |
| Keenan (Shattler, Hossack) – 20:25 | 3–1 |
| Corbeil (Hossack) – 21:25 | 4–1 |
| | 4–2 | 22:11 – Resetarits (Shanks, Campbell) |
| | 4–3 | 23:39 – Shanks (Jackson, Magnan) (SH) |
| Shattler (Messenger, Kirk) – 25:43 | 5–3 |
| Knight (Matthews) – 27:01 | 6–3 |
| | 6–4 | 27:25 – Jamieson (Resetarits, Shanks) |
| | 6–5 | 34:21 – Currier (Campbell) |
| Shattler (Knight, McIntosh) – 35:57 | 7–5 |
| | 7–6 | 37:19 – Jamieson |
| | 7–7 | 39:27 – Currier |
| | 7–8 | 39:42 – Jamieson (Jackson, Shanks) |
| Shattler (McIntosh, Matthews) (PP) – 41:05 | 8–8 |
| Corbeil (Rubisch) – 41:32 | 9–8 |
| Dinsdale (Matthews, McIntosh) – 42:46 | 10–8 |
| McIntosh (Matthews, Sorichetti) – 47:08 | 11–8 |
| | 11–9 | 47:29 – Fannell (Shanks, Jamieson) |
| | 11–10 | 48:00 – Currier (Jackson, Campbell) |
| Knight – 52:56 | 12–10 |
| Keenan (McIntosh, Matthews) – 53:38 | 13–10 |
| Dinsdale (Knight, Matthews) – 56:15 | 14–10 |
| Corbeil (Rubisch) (ENG) – 57:26 | 15–10 |

4 min
Penalties
6 min
52
Shots
47

Rush wins series 2–1.

== Awards ==
=== Annual awards ===
| Award | Winner | Other Finalists |
|---|---|---|
| Most Valuable Player | Mark Matthews, Saskatchewan | Robert Church, Saskatchewan; Kevin Crowley, New England |
| Goaltender of the Year | Matt Vinc, Rochester | Christian Del Bianco, Calgary; Dillon Ward, Colorado |
| Defensive Player of the Year | Graeme Hossack, Rochester | Robert Hope, Colorado; Kyle Rubisch, Saskatchewan |
| Transition Player of the Year | Joey Cupido, Colorado | Zach Currier, Calgary; Challen Rogers, Toronto |
| Rookie of the Year | Jake Withers, Rochester | Zach Currier, Calgary; Austin Shanks, Rochester |
| Sportsmanship Award | Lyle Thompson, Georgia | Jordan Gilles, Colorado; John Lafontaine, New England |
| GM of the Year | Curt Styres, Rochester | Mike Board, Calgary; Derek Keenan, Saskatchewan |
| Les Bartley Award | Derek Keenan, Saskatchewan | Pat Coyle, Colorado; Mike Hasen, Rochester |
| Executive of the Year Award | Matt Hutchings, Colorado | Andy Arlotta, Georgia; Al Ryz, Saskatchewan |
| Teammate of the Year Award | Craig England, Buffalo | Chris Corbeil, Saskatchewan; Brandon Miller, Toronto |
| Tom Borrelli Award | Stephen Stamp | Jake Elliott; Teddy Jenner |

=== All-Pro First Team ===
- Kevin Crowley, New England Black Wolves
- Mark Matthews, Saskatchewan Rush
- Robert Church, Saskatchewan Rush
- Joey Cupido, Colorado Mammoth
- Graeme Hossack, Rochester Knighthawks
- Matt Vinc, Rochester Knighthawks

=== All-Pro Second Team ===
- Curtis Dickson, Calgary Roughnecks
- Joe Resetarits, Rochester Knighthawks
- Lyle Thompson, Georgia Swarm
- Zach Currier, Calgary Roughnecks
- Kyle Rubisch, Saskatchewan Rush
- Dillon Ward, Colorado Mammoth

=== All-Rookie Team ===
- Josh Byrne, Buffalo Bandits
- Zach Currier, Calgary Roughnecks
- Eric Fannell, Rochester Knighthawks
- Austin Shanks, Rochester Knighthawks
- Colton Watkinson, New England Black Wolves
- Jake Withers, Rochester Knighthawks

== Stadiums and locations ==
| Buffalo Bandits | Georgia Swarm | New England Black Wolves | Rochester Knighthawks | Toronto Rock |
|---|---|---|---|---|
| KeyBank Center | Infinite Energy Arena | Mohegan Sun Arena | Blue Cross Arena | Air Canada Centre |
| Capacity: 19,070 | Capacity: 11,355 | Capacity: 7,700 | Capacity: 11,200 | Capacity: 18,819 |

| Calgary Roughnecks | Colorado Mammoth | Saskatchewan Rush | Vancouver Stealth |
|---|---|---|---|
| Scotiabank Saddledome | Pepsi Center | SaskTel Centre | Langley Events Centre |
| Capacity: 19,289 | Capacity: 18,007 | Capacity: 15,190 | Capacity: 5,276 |

== Attendance ==
=== Regular season ===
| Home team | Home games | Average attendance | Total attendance |
|---|---|---|---|
| Saskatchewan Rush | 9 | 14,639 | 131,754 |
| Buffalo Bandits | 9 | 14,181 | 127,634 |
| Colorado Mammoth | 9 | 14,077 | 126,693 |
| Calgary Roughnecks | 9 | 11,847 | 106,623 |
| Toronto Rock | 9 | 9,700 | 87,301 |
| Rochester Knighthawks | 9 | 6,760 | 60,841 |
| New England Black Wolves | 9 | 5,557 | 50,013 |
| Georgia Swarm | 9 | 4,437 | 39,940 |
| Vancouver Stealth | 9 | 3,507 | 31,568 |
| League | 81 | 9,411 | 762,367 |

=== Playoffs ===
| Home team | Home games | Average attendance | Total attendance |
|---|---|---|---|
| Colorado Mammoth | 1 | 13,884 | 13,884 |
| Saskatchewan Rush | 3 | 12,351 | 37,055 |
| Rochester Knighthawks | 2 | 7,218 | 14,437 |
| Georgia Swarm | 1 | 4,106 | 4,106 |
| League | 7 | 9,926 | 69,482 |

== See also ==
- 2018 in sports
