= 2018 New England Black Wolves season =

2018 New England Black Wolves
- League: NLL
- Division: 3rd East
- 2018 record: 9-9
- Home record: 4-5
- Road record: 5-4
- Goals for: 194
- Goals against: 242
- General Manager: Chris Seinko
- Coach: Glenn Clark
- Captain: Shawn Evans
- Alternate captains: Brett Manney; Kyle Buchanan
- Arena: Mohegan Sun Arena
- Average attendance: 5,557

Team leaders
- Goals: Kevin Crowley (51)
- Assists: Stephan Leblanc (46)
- Points: Kevin Crowley (76)
- Penalties in minutes: Joel Coyle, Callum Crawford(31)
- Loose Balls: Jay Thorimbert (136)
- Wins: Aaron Bold (9)
- Goals against average: Aaron Bold (12.50)

The New England Black Wolves are a lacrosse team based in Uncasville, Connecticut playing in the National Lacrosse League (NLL). The 2018 season will be the team's 4th season in the league.

== Regular season ==
=== Current standings ===
East Division
P	Team	GP	W	L	PCT	GB	Home	Road	GF	GA	Diff	GF/GP	GA/GP
1	Georgia Swarm – xy	18	11	7	.611	0.0	6–3	5–4	226	215	+11	12.56	11.94
2	Rochester Knighthawks – x	18	10	8	.556	1.0	5–4	5–4	236	210	+26	13.11	11.67
3	New England Black Wolves – x	18	9	9	.500	2.0	4–5	5–4	194	242	−48	10.78	13.44
4	Toronto Rock	18	8	10	.444	3.0	3–6	5–4	237	216	+21	13.17	12.00
5	Buffalo Bandits	18	8	10	.444	3.0	4–5	4–5	232	240	−8	12.89	13.33

West Division
P	Team	GP	W	L	PCT	GB	Home	Road	GF	GA	Diff	GF/GP	GA/GP
1	Saskatchewan Rush – xyz	18	14	4	.778	0.0	6–3	8–1	254	196	+58	14.11	10.89
2	Colorado Mammoth – x	18	11	7	.611	3.0	5–4	6–3	214	199	+15	11.89	11.06
3	Calgary Roughnecks – x	18	8	10	.444	6.0	5–4	3–6	227	211	+16	12.61	11.72
4	Vancouver Stealth	18	2	16	.111	12.0	0–9	2–7	186	277	−91	10.33	15.39

x: Clinched playoff berth; c: Clinched playoff berth by crossing over to another division; y: Clinched division; z: Clinched best regular season record; GP: Games Played
W: Wins; L: Losses; GB: Games back; PCT: Win percentage; Home: Record at Home; Road: Record on the Road; GF: Goals scored; GA: Goals allowed
Differential: Difference between goals scored and allowed; GF/GP: Average number of goals scored per game; GA/GP: Average number of goals allowed per game

== Game log ==
Game	Date	Opponent	Location	Score	OT	Attendance	Record
1	December 8, 2017	Georgia Swarm	Mohegan Sun Arena	W 13–11		5,489	1–0
2	December 23, 2017	@ Saskatchewan Rush	SaskTel Centre	L 11–24		14,344	1–1
3	December 29, 2017	Vancouver Stealth	Mohegan Sun Arena	W 13–9		5,608	2–1
4	January 13, 2018	@ Rochester Knighthawks	Blue Cross Arena	W 9–8		6,336	3–1
5	January 21, 2018	Rochester Knighthawks	Mohegan Sun Arena	W 11–9		5,373	4–1
6	January 27, 2018	@ Toronto Rock	Air Canada Centre	L 9–21		9,145	4–2
7	February 9, 2018	Buffalo Bandits	Mohegan Sun Arena	L 13–18		5,357	4–3
8	February 18, 2018	Colorado Mammoth	Mohegan Sun Arena	L 11–19		5,720	4–4
9	February 24, 2018	@ Vancouver Stealth	Langley Events Centre	W 12–11	OT	3,073	5–4
10	March 11, 2018	@ Toronto Rock	Air Canada Centre	W 8–7		10,259	6–4
11	March 16, 2018	Toronto Rock	Mohegan Sun Arena	L 9–14		5,832	6–5
12	March 23, 2018	Buffalo Bandits	Mohegan Sun Arena	L 7–20		5,378	6–6
13	March 24, 2018	@ Georgia Swarm	Infinite Energy Arena	L 12–17		5,039	6–7
14	March 31, 2018	@ Buffalo Bandits	KeyBank Center	L 11–14		13,709	6–8
15	April 8, 2018	Calgary Roughnecks	Mohegan Sun Arena	W 13–12		5,098	7–8
16	April 14, 2018	@ Colorado Mammoth	Pepsi Center	W 10–6		15,303	8–8
17	April 21, 2018	@ Rochester Knighthawks	Blue Cross Arena	W 11–6		8,143	9–8
18	April 29, 2018	Georgia Swarm	Mohegan Sun Arena	L 11–16		6,158	9–9

=== Playoffs ===
Game	Date	Opponent	Location	Score	OT	Attendance	Record
Eastern division semi-final	May 4, 2018	@ Rochester Knighthawks	Blue Cross Arena	L 11–15		5,263	0–1

== Roster ==
New England Black Wolves roster
Active (21-man) roster		Inactive roster	Coaches
Goaltenders: 77 (Canada) Aaron Bold; 30 (Canada) Doug Jamieson; Defensemen: 10 (Iroquois) Adam Bomberry; 4 (Canada) David Brock; 71 (Canada) Sheldon Burns; 24 (Canada) Joel Coyle; 13 (United States) Brett Manney (A); 45 (Canada) Matt Spanger; 7 (Canada) Derek Suddons	Forwards: 27 (United States) Kevin Buchanan; 91 (Canada) Kyle Buchanan (A); 41 (Canada) Mark Cockerton; 21 (Canada) Kevin Crowley; 15 (Canada) Shawn Evans (C); 83 (Canada) JP Kealey; 9 (Canada) Reilly O'Connor; 12 (United States) Seth Oakes; Transition: 33 (Canada) John LaFontaine; 75 (Canada) Jay Thorimbert; 17 (Canada) Colton Watkinson		Head coach {{{Head Coach}}} Legend: * Suspended list; (C) Captain; (A) Alternate captain; Roster updated 2017-12-09; NLL Transactions

=== Entry Draft ===
The 2017 NLL Entry Draft took place on September 18, 2017. The Black Wolves made the following selections:

Round	Overall	Player	College/Club
1	7	Colton Watkinson	
1	8	Anthony Joaquim	
1	10	JP Kealey	
2	17	Nick Chaykowsky	
3	27	Larken Kemp	
4	37	Nick Mariano	
5	46	Matt Rambo	
6	54	Cam Milligan	

== See also ==
- 2018 NLL season
