= 2018 Georgia Swarm season =

National Lacrosse League season

2018 Georgia Swarm
- League: NLL
- Division: 1st East
- 2018 record: 11-7
- Home record: 6-3
- Road record: 5-4
- Goals for: 226
- Goals against: 215
- General Manager: John J. Arlotta
- Coach: Ed Comeau
- Captain: Jordan MacIntosh
- Alternate captains: Shayne Jackson; Jason Noble
- Arena: Infinite Energy Arena
- Average attendance: 4,437

Team leaders
- Goals: Lyle Thompson (46)
- Assists: Shayne Jackson (52)
- Points: Lyle Thompson (86)
- Penalties in minutes: Bryan Cole (25)
- Loose Balls: Lyle Thompson (123)
- Wins: Mike Poulin (11)
- Goals against average: Mike Poulin (11.69)

The 2018 Georgia Swarm season is the 3rd season of the Georgia Swarm, a lacrosse team based in Duluth, Georgia playing in the National Lacrosse League. The team was formerly based in Saint Paul, Minnesota and was known as the Minnesota Swarm.

== Regular season ==
=== Final standings ===
East Division
P	Team	GP	W	L	PCT	GB	Home	Road	GF	GA	Diff	GF/GP	GA/GP
1	Georgia Swarm – xy	18	11	7	.611	0.0	6–3	5–4	226	215	+11	12.56	11.94
2	Rochester Knighthawks – x	18	10	8	.556	1.0	5–4	5–4	236	210	+26	13.11	11.67
3	New England Black Wolves – x	18	9	9	.500	2.0	4–5	5–4	194	242	−48	10.78	13.44
4	Toronto Rock	18	8	10	.444	3.0	3–6	5–4	237	216	+21	13.17	12.00
5	Buffalo Bandits	18	8	10	.444	3.0	4–5	4–5	232	240	−8	12.89	13.33

West Division
P	Team	GP	W	L	PCT	GB	Home	Road	GF	GA	Diff	GF/GP	GA/GP
1	Saskatchewan Rush – xyz	18	14	4	.778	0.0	6–3	8–1	254	196	+58	14.11	10.89
2	Colorado Mammoth – x	18	11	7	.611	3.0	5–4	6–3	214	199	+15	11.89	11.06
3	Calgary Roughnecks – x	18	8	10	.444	6.0	5–4	3–6	227	211	+16	12.61	11.72
4	Vancouver Stealth	18	2	16	.111	12.0	0–9	2–7	186	277	−91	10.33	15.39

x: Clinched playoff berth; c: Clinched playoff berth by crossing over to another division; y: Clinched division; z: Clinched best regular season record; GP: Games Played
W: Wins; L: Losses; GB: Games back; PCT: Win percentage; Home: Record at Home; Road: Record on the Road; GF: Goals scored; GA: Goals allowed
Differential: Difference between goals scored and allowed; GF/GP: Average number of goals scored per game; GA/GP: Average number of goals allowed per game

=== Game log ===
Game	Date	Opponent	Location	Score	OT	Attendance	Record
1	December 8, 2017	@ New England Black Wolves	Mohegan Sun Arena	L 11–13		5,489	0–1
2	December 23, 2017	@ Colorado Mammoth	Pepsi Center	L 11–14		13,125	0–2
3	December 30, 2017	Rochester Knighthawks	Infinite Energy Arena	W 14–11		6,254	1–2
4	January 6, 2018	Saskatchewan Rush	Infinite Energy Arena	L 9–13		3,714	1–3
5	January 13, 2018	@ Calgary Roughnecks	Scotiabank Saddledome	W 15–12		11,843	2–3
6	January 27, 2018	@ Vancouver Stealth	Langley Events Centre	W 16–12		3,423	3–3
7	February 10, 2018	@ Buffalo Bandits	KeyBank Center	L 9–18		14,058	3–4
8	February 11, 2018	Rochester Knighthawks	Infinite Energy Arena	L 10–17		3,181	3–5
9	February 17, 2018	Toronto Rock	Infinite Energy Arena	W 14–13	OT	5,052	4–5
10	March 2, 2018	Colorado Mammoth	Infinite Energy Arena	L 10–11		3,093	4–6
11	March 4, 2018	@ Toronto Rock	Air Canada Centre	W 12–7		10,679	5–6
12	March 10, 2018	@ Rochester Knighthawks	Blue Cross Arena	L 10–11	OT	7,214	5–7
13	March 18, 2018	Buffalo Bandits	Infinite Energy Arena	W 14–10		3,863	6–7
14	March 24, 2018	New England Black Wolves	Infinite Energy Arena	W 17–12		5,039	7–7
15	April 8, 2018	Toronto Rock	Infinite Energy Arena	W 11–10		4,496	8–7
16	April 14, 2018	@ Saskatchewan Rush	SaskTel Centre	W 16–10		14,745	9–7
17	April 28, 2018	Vancouver Stealth	Infinite Energy Arena	W 11–10		5,248	10–7
18	April 29, 2018	@ New England Black Wolves	Mohegan Sun Arena	W 16–11		6,158	11–7

=== Playoffs ===
Game	Date	Opponent	Location	Score	OT	Attendance	Record
Eastern division final	May 12, 2018	Rochester Knighthawks	Infinite Energy Arena	L 8–9		4,106	0–1

== Roster ==
Georgia Swarm roster
Active (21-man) roster		Inactive roster	Coaches
Goaltenders: 76 (Iroquois) Warren Hill; 29 (Canada) Kevin Orleman; 30 (Canada) Mike Poulin; Defensemen: 10 (Canada) Alex Crepinsek; 45 (Canada) Jason Noble (A); 31 (United States) John Ranagan; 13 (Canada) Connor Sellars; 25 (Canada) Leo Stouros	Forwards: 32 (Canada) Shayne Jackson (A); 19 (Canada) Jesse King; 46 (Canada) Kiel Matisz; 93 (Iroquois) Johnny Powless; 83 (Iroquois) Randy Staats; 22 (Iroquois) Jerome Thompson; 4 (Iroquois) Lyle Thompson; 2 (Iroquois) Miles Thompson; Transition: 89 (Iroquois) Frank Brown; 55 (Canada) Bryan Cole; 24 (Canada) Jordan MacIntosh (C); 28 (Iroquois) Zed Williams	Practice squad: (United States) Isaiah Davis-Allen; Lauchlin Elder; Brayden Hill	Head coach {{{Head Coach}}} Legend: * Suspended list; (C) Captain; (A) Alternate captain; Roster updated 2017-12-08; NLL Transactions

=== Entry Draft ===
The 2017 NLL Entry Draft took place on September 18, 2017. The Swarm made the following selections:

Round	Overall	Player	College/Club
1	4	Zed Williams	
3	24	Frank Brown	
3	32	Mason Jones	
4	42	Nik Farrus	
5	47	Bennett Drake	
5	50	Isaiah Davis-Allen	
6	59	Adam Osika	

== See also ==
- 2018 NLL season
