= 2018 Calgary Roughnecks season =

2018 Calgary Roughnecks
- League: NLL
- Division: 3rd West
- 2018 record: 8-10
- Home record: 5-4
- Road record: 3-6
- Goals for: 227
- Goals against: 211
- General Manager: Mike Board
- Coach: Curt Malawsky
- Captain: Dan McRae
- Arena: Scotiabank Saddledome
- Average attendance: 11,847

Team leaders
- Goals: Cutis Dickson (47)
- Assists: Wesley Berg, Dane Dobbie (49)
- Points: Cutis Dickson (92)
- Penalties in minutes: Dane Dobbie (44)
- Loose Balls: Zach Currier (200)
- Wins: Christian Del Bianco (7)
- Goals against average: Christian Del Bianco (10.50)

The Calgary Roughnecks are a lacrosse team based in Calgary playing in the National Lacrosse League (NLL). The 2018 season is the 17th in franchise history.

== Final standings ==
East Division
| P | Team | GP | W | L | PCT | GB | Home | Road | GF | GA | Diff | GF/GP | GA/GP |
|---|---|---|---|---|---|---|---|---|---|---|---|---|---|
| 1 | Georgia Swarm – xy | 18 | 11 | 7 | .611 | 0.0 | 6–3 | 5–4 | 226 | 215 | +11 | 12.56 | 11.94 |
| 2 | Rochester Knighthawks – x | 18 | 10 | 8 | .556 | 1.0 | 5–4 | 5–4 | 236 | 210 | +26 | 13.11 | 11.67 |
| 3 | New England Black Wolves – x | 18 | 9 | 9 | .500 | 2.0 | 4–5 | 5–4 | 194 | 242 | −48 | 10.78 | 13.44 |
| 4 | Toronto Rock | 18 | 8 | 10 | .444 | 3.0 | 3–6 | 5–4 | 237 | 216 | +21 | 13.17 | 12.00 |
| 5 | Buffalo Bandits | 18 | 8 | 10 | .444 | 3.0 | 4–5 | 4–5 | 232 | 240 | −8 | 12.89 | 13.33 |

West Division
| P | Team | GP | W | L | PCT | GB | Home | Road | GF | GA | Diff | GF/GP | GA/GP |
|---|---|---|---|---|---|---|---|---|---|---|---|---|---|
| 1 | Saskatchewan Rush – xyz | 18 | 14 | 4 | .778 | 0.0 | 6–3 | 8–1 | 254 | 196 | +58 | 14.11 | 10.89 |
| 2 | Colorado Mammoth – x | 18 | 11 | 7 | .611 | 3.0 | 5–4 | 6–3 | 214 | 199 | +15 | 11.89 | 11.06 |
| 3 | Calgary Roughnecks – x | 18 | 8 | 10 | .444 | 6.0 | 5–4 | 3–6 | 227 | 211 | +16 | 12.61 | 11.72 |
| 4 | Vancouver Stealth | 18 | 2 | 16 | .111 | 12.0 | 0–9 | 2–7 | 186 | 277 | −91 | 10.33 | 15.39 |

x: Clinched playoff berth; c: Clinched playoff berth by crossing over to another division; y: Clinched division; z: Clinched best regular season record; GP: Games Played
W: Wins; L: Losses; GB: Games back; PCT: Win percentage; Home: Record at Home; Road: Record on the Road; GF: Goals scored; GA: Goals allowed
Differential: Difference between goals scored and allowed; GF/GP: Average number of goals scored per game; GA/GP: Average number of goals allowed per game

== Game log ==
=== Regular season ===
| Game | Date | Opponent | Location | Score | OT | Attendance | Record |
|---|---|---|---|---|---|---|---|
| 1 | December 9, 2017 | @ Rochester Knighthawks | Blue Cross Arena | L 6–17 | | 4,596 | 0–1 |
| 2 | December 15, 2017 | Vancouver Stealth | Scotiabank Saddledome | W 15–12 | | 9,708 | 1–1 |
| 3 | December 29, 2017 | Colorado Mammoth | Scotiabank Saddledome | L 7–11 | | 9,555 | 1–2 |
| 4 | January 6, 2018 | @ Buffalo Bandits | KeyBank Center | L 8–13 | | 11,803 | 1–3 |
| 5 | January 13, 2018 | Georgia Swarm | Scotiabank Saddledome | L 12–15 | | 11,843 | 1–4 |
| 6 | January 27, 2018 | Saskatchewan Rush | Scotiabank Saddledome | L 12–13 | OT | 11,196 | 1–5 |
| 7 | February 3, 2018 | @ Toronto Rock | Air Canada Centre | W 16–8 | | 10,344 | 2–5 |
| 8 | February 10, 2018 | Colorado Mammoth | Scotiabank Saddledome | W 13–9 | | 11,167 | 3–5 |
| 9 | February 16, 2018 | Vancouver Stealth | Scotiabank Saddledome | W 20–12 | | 8,874 | 4–5 |
| 10 | February 24, 2018 | @ Saskatchewan Rush | SaskTel Centre | L 6–10 | | 15,075 | 4–6 |
| 11 | March 10, 2018 | @ Colorado Mammoth | Pepsi Center | L 7–8 | | 15,034 | 4–7 |
| 12 | March 17, 2018 | Rochester Knighthawks | Scotiabank Saddledome | W 14–13 | | 15,070 | 5–7 |
| 13 | March 24, 2018 | Toronto Rock | Scotiabank Saddledome | L 14–17 | | 12,097 | 5–8 |
| 14 | March 31, 2018 | @ Vancouver Stealth | Langley Events Centre | W 13–9 | | 3,363 | 6–8 |
| 15 | April 8, 2018 | @ New England Black Wolves | Mohegan Sun Arena | L 12–13 | | 5,098 | 6–9 |
| 16 | April 14, 2018 | Buffalo Bandits | Scotiabank Saddledome | W 16–9 | | 17,113 | 7–9 |
| 17 | April 21, 2018 | @ Vancouver Stealth | Langley Events Centre | W 26–11 | | 3,653 | 8–9 |
| 18 | April 28, 2018 | @ Saskatchewan Rush | SaskTel Centre | L 10–11 | | 14,671 | 8–10 |

=== Playoffs ===
| Game | Date | Opponent | Location | Score | OT | Attendance | Record |
|---|---|---|---|---|---|---|---|
| Western division semi-final | May 5, 2018 | @ Colorado Mammoth | Pepsi Center | W 15–12 | | 13,884 | 1–0 |
| Western division final | May 13, 2018 | @ Saskatchewan Rush | SaskTel Centre | L 13–15 | | 11,568 | 1–1 |

== Roster ==
Calgary Roughnecks roster
| Active (21-man) roster | | Inactive roster | Coaches |
|---|---|---|---|
| Goaltenders: 35 (Canada) Christian Del Bianco; 92 (Canada) Frankie Scigliano; Defensemen: 94 (Canada) Tyson Bell; 7 (Canada) Tyler Burton; 25 (Canada) Chad Cummings; 77 (Canada) Zach Currier; 11 (Canada) Greg Harnett (A); 81 (Canada) Anthony Kalinich; 3 (Canada) Dan MacRae (C); 10 (Canada) Curtis Manning; 6 (Canada) Garrett McIntosh; 68 (Canada) Tyler Pace; 8 (Canada) Creighton Reid; 55 (Canada) Mitch Wilde | Forwards: 14 (Canada) Wesley Berg; 19 (Canada) Holden Cattoni; 17 (Canada) Curtis Dickson (A); 23 (Canada) Tyler Digby; 44 (Canada) Dane Dobbie (A); 89 (Canada) Riley Loewen | Practice squad: -- (Canada) Steph Charbonneau; -- (Canada) Ryan Martel; 41 (Canada) Bob Snider; Injured reserve: 52 (Canada) Kellen LeClair; Unable to play: 16 (Canada) Mike Carnegie | Head coach {{{Head Coach}}} Legend: * Suspended list; (C) Captain; (A) Alternate captain; updated 2019-01-18; NLL Transactions |

=== Entry Draft ===
The 2017 NLL Entry Draft took place on September 18, 2017. The Roughnecks made the following selections:

| Round | Overall | Player | College/Club |
|---|---|---|---|
| 1 | 3 | Zach Currier | |
| 1 | 9 | Tyler Pace | |
| 1 | 11 | Ryan Martel | |
| 2 | 21 | Anthony Kalinich | |
| 2 | 22 | Cole Pickup | |
| 2 | 23 | Cole Shafer | |
| 3 | 26 | Liam Patten | |
| 5 | 45 | Steph Charbonneau | |
| 6 | 53 | Mitch McDole | |

== See also ==
- 2018 NLL season
