= 2018 Vancouver Stealth season =

2018 Vancouver Stealth
- League: NLL
- Division: 4th West
- 2018 record: 2-16
- Home record: 0-9
- Road record: 2-7
- Goals for: 186
- Goals against: 277
- General Manager: Doug Locker
- Coach: Jamie Batley
- Captain: Matt Beers
- Alternate captains: Rhys Duch; Cliff Smith
- Arena: Langley Event Centre
- Average attendance: 3,507

Team leaders
- Goals: Corey Small (28)
- Assists: Corey Small (49)
- Points: Corey Small (77)
- Penalties in minutes: Matt Beers (45)
- Loose Balls: Ian Hawksbee (147)
- Wins: Eric Penney (2)
- Goals against average: Brodie Macdonald (13.51)

The Vancouver Stealth are a lacrosse team based in Vancouver, British Columbia. The team plays in the National Lacrosse League (NLL). The 2018 season is the 19th in franchise history and the 5th season in Vancouver. The franchise previously played in Everett, Washington, San Jose, and Albany, New York.

== Regular season ==
=== Final standings ===
East Division
P	Team	GP	W	L	PCT	GB	Home	Road	GF	GA	Diff	GF/GP	GA/GP
1	Georgia Swarm – xy	18	11	7	.611	0.0	6–3	5–4	226	215	+11	12.56	11.94
2	Rochester Knighthawks – x	18	10	8	.556	1.0	5–4	5–4	236	210	+26	13.11	11.67
3	New England Black Wolves – x	18	9	9	.500	2.0	4–5	5–4	194	242	−48	10.78	13.44
4	Toronto Rock	18	8	10	.444	3.0	3–6	5–4	237	216	+21	13.17	12.00
5	Buffalo Bandits	18	8	10	.444	3.0	4–5	4–5	232	240	−8	12.89	13.33

West Division
P	Team	GP	W	L	PCT	GB	Home	Road	GF	GA	Diff	GF/GP	GA/GP
1	Saskatchewan Rush – xyz	18	14	4	.778	0.0	6–3	8–1	254	196	+58	14.11	10.89
2	Colorado Mammoth – x	18	11	7	.611	3.0	5–4	6–3	214	199	+15	11.89	11.06
3	Calgary Roughnecks – x	18	8	10	.444	6.0	5–4	3–6	227	211	+16	12.61	11.72
4	Vancouver Stealth	18	2	16	.111	12.0	0–9	2–7	186	277	−91	10.33	15.39

x: Clinched playoff berth; c: Clinched playoff berth by crossing over to another division; y: Clinched division; z: Clinched best regular season record; GP: Games Played
W: Wins; L: Losses; GB: Games back; PCT: Win percentage; Home: Record at Home; Road: Record on the Road; GF: Goals scored; GA: Goals allowed
Differential: Difference between goals scored and allowed; GF/GP: Average number of goals scored per game; GA/GP: Average number of goals allowed per game

=== Game log ===
Game	Date	Opponent	Location	Score	OT	Attendance	Record
1	December 8, 2017	Colorado Mammoth	Langley Events Centre	L 8–15		3,201	0–1
2	December 15, 2017	@ Calgary Roughnecks	Scotiabank Saddledome	L 12–15		9,708	0–2
3	December 29, 2017	@ New England Black Wolves	Mohegan Sun Arena	L 9–13		5,608	0–3
4	January 6, 2018	Toronto Rock	Langley Events Centre	L 7–24		4,206	0–4
5	January 13, 2018	@ Buffalo Bandits	KeyBank Center	W 11–10	OT	12,610	1–4
6	January 26, 2018	@ Colorado Mammoth	Pepsi Center	L 13–14		12,016	1–5
7	January 27, 2018	Georgia Swarm	Langley Events Centre	L 12–16		3,423	1–6
8	February 3, 2018	@ Saskatchewan Rush	SaskTel Centre	L 9–11		14,387	1–7
9	February 10, 2018	Saskatchewan Rush	Langley Events Centre	L 9–16		4,113	1–8
10	February 16, 2018	@ Calgary Roughnecks	Scotiabank Saddledome	L 12–20		8,874	1–9
11	February 24, 2018	New England Black Wolves	Langley Events Centre	L 11–12	OT	3,073	1–10
12	March 3, 2018	@ Saskatchewan Rush	SaskTel Centre	L 10–16		14,057	1–11
13	March 17, 2018	Colorado Mammoth	Langley Events Centre	L 10–13		3,013	1–12
14	March 24, 2018	@ Colorado Mammoth	Pepsi Center	W 13–12		15,541	2–12
15	March 31, 2018	Calgary Roughnecks	Langley Events Centre	L 9–13		3,363	2–13
16	April 13, 2018	Saskatchewan Rush	Langley Events Centre	L 10–20		3,523	2–14
17	April 21, 2018	Calgary Roughnecks	Langley Events Centre	L 11–26		3,653	2–15
18	April 28, 2018	@ Georgia Swarm	Infinite Energy Arena	L 10–11		5,248	2–16

== Roster ==
Vancouver Stealth roster
Active (21-man) roster		Inactive roster	Coaches
Goaltenders: 50 (Canada) Brodie MacDonald; 31 (Canada) Tye Belanger; Defensemen: 2 (Canada) Matt Beers; 4 (United States) Chris O'Dougherty; 80 (Canada) Peter McFetridge; 88 (Canada) Ian Hawksbee	Forwards: 10 (Canada) Rhys Duch (A); 15 (Canada) Corey Small; 18 (Canada) Logan Schuss (A); 22 (Canada) Evan Messenger; 32 (Canada) James Rahe; 44 (Canada) Tony Malcom; 55 (Canada) Joel McCready; 14 (Canada) Pat Saunders; Transition: 5 (Canada) Cliff Smith; 14 (Canada) Brandon Goodwin; 19 (Canada) Justin Salt; 20 (Canada) Travis Cornwall; 63 (Canada) Brandon Clelland; 88 (Canada) Ian Hawksbee; 96 (Canada) Andrew Suitor	Practice Squad: 61 (Canada) Eric Penney (G); Injured Reserve: 33 (Canada) Jon Harnett; Holdout: 8 (Canada) Tyler Hass (T); 44 (Canada) Brendan Ranford (T)	Head Coach {{{Head Coach}}} Legend: * Suspended list; (C) Captain; (A) Alternate captain; Roster updated 2017-12-09; NLL Transactions

=== Entry Draft ===
The 2017 NLL Entry Draft took place on September 18, 2017. The Stealth made the following selections:

Round	Overall	Player	College/Club
2	12	Ryan Fournier	
3	29	Sam Degroot	
4	39	Jeff Wittig	
5	48	Eric Kratz	
6	56	Andrew Garant	

== See also ==
- 2018 NLL season
