= Collegiate club sports in the United States =

Non-varsity college sports

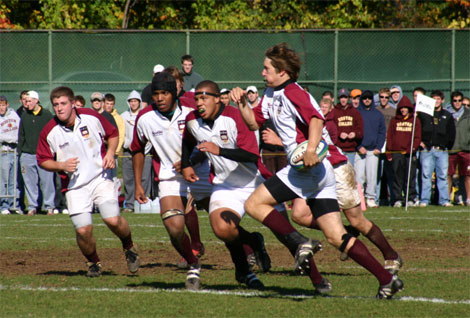
A Boston College rugby home match

Collegiate club sports in the United States are any sports offered at a university or college in the United States that compete competitively with other universities, or colleges, but are not regulated by the National Collegiate Athletic Association (NCAA) or National Association of Intercollegiate Athletics (NAIA), and do not have varsity status. Collegiate club sports can exist at schools that do have teams that are part of the NCAA or NAIA. Many times, club sports are student-run and receive little financial aid from the school. An estimated 2 million student athletes compete in club sports.

Typically, most sports offered at universities and offered in youth leagues are also available as a collegiate club team. However, the variety of sports offered is also often related to the size of the school. Collegiate club sports offer college athletes the ability to play at a competitive level, but without the time commitment generally required for a sport governed by the NCAA. The tryout procedure for club sports varies from school to school and from sport to sport.

== Responsibility of club sport members ==
Collegiate club sports differ from NCAA sports in the way that they are almost entirely paid for by students through student fees, generally from $50 for certain sports up to $3,000 a year for more expensive sports such as ice hockey. This offers the students a unique opportunity because the club team is operated by students, including in many instances, registered student organizations who must organize and ensure financial support for all club activities. Activities may include picking and paying a coach, nominating and voting on club officers, buying team jerseys and equipment, paying for and deciding on team travel, etc. Many captains or club presidents of club sport teams act like managers in comparison to the captains of NCAA teams. However, some universities or colleges will provide some level of support, including access to facilities and club advisors, and in some instances some level of financial support or access to financial support through university supported student funding boards.

== Governing bodies ==
There is no single national governing body for all club sports. Collegiate club sports are often, but not always, governed by a governing body such as the National Collegiate Sport Committee. Much of soccer, flag football, basketball, and tennis is governed by the National Intramural and Recreational Sports Association (NIRSA). Water-skiing and Wakeboarding teams are governed by the National Collegiate Water Ski Association (NCWSA). Kiteboarding is governed by the Collegiate Kiteboarding Association. Surfing is governed by the National Scholastic Surfing Association (NSSA). Skiing and snowboarding teams are governed by the United States College Ski Association (USCSA). Ice Hockey has multiple governing bodies, most notably the CHF and ACHA. Golf is governed by the National Collegiate Club Golf Association (NCCGA). Governing bodies usually have the job of organizing tournaments, a league, national or regional championships, providing officials for matches, as well as providing rules, regulations, and bylaws which all teams governed by that body are required to follow. Baseball, football, softball, and basketball are governed by an organization known as CollClubSports, based in Pittsburgh, PA. The NCBA, NCSA, and NCBBA each are very competitive leagues that are quickly growing in numbers. Two partially overlapping sanctioning bodies, the National Club Football Association (NCFA) and Intercollegiate Club Football Federation (ICFF), oversee Club Division College Football at the national level. The National Collegiate Volleyball Federation (NCVF) registers hundreds of club teams each who participate in over 20 collegiate club leagues, thousands of men's and women's intercollegiate club competitions and the annual NCVF National Championship Tournament. The National Intercollegiate Running Club Association also administers a track and field and cross country program. The National Collegiate Roller Hockey Association is the governing body of intercollegiate inline hockey. USA Ultimate is the governing body of Ultimate Frisbee.

Due to the lack of a single, national governing body for club sports, student motivation is crucial to keeping programs running.

== See also ==
- United States Collegiate Athletic Association
- College athletics
- College athletics in the United States
- Intercollegiate sports team champions
- Intramural sports
