= 2018 Rochester Knighthawks season =

2018 Rochester Knighthawks
- East Division Champions
- League: NLL
- Division: 2nd East
- 2018 record: 10-8
- Home record: 5-4
- Road record: 5-4
- Goals for: 236
- Goals against: 210
- General Manager: Curt Styres
- Coach: Mike Hasen
- Captain: Sid Smith
- Alternate captains: Scott Campbell
- Arena: Blue Cross Arena
- Average attendance: 6,760

Team leaders
- Goals: Joe Resetaritis, Kyle Jackson (37)
- Assists: Cody Jamieson, Joe Resetaritis (63)
- Points: Joe Resetaritis (100)
- Penalties in minutes: Billy Dee Smith (35)
- Loose Balls: Graeme Hossack (163)
- Wins: Matt Vinc (9)
- Goals against average: Matt Vinc (11.37)

The Rochester Knighthawks were a lacrosse team based in Rochester, New York, that played in the National Lacrosse League (NLL). The 2018 season was the 24th in franchise history.

== Regular season ==
=== Final standings ===
East Division
| P | Team | GP | W | L | PCT | GB | Home | Road | GF | GA | Diff | GF/GP | GA/GP |
|---|---|---|---|---|---|---|---|---|---|---|---|---|---|
| 1 | Georgia Swarm – xy | 18 | 11 | 7 | .611 | 0.0 | 6–3 | 5–4 | 226 | 215 | +11 | 12.56 | 11.94 |
| 2 | Rochester Knighthawks – x | 18 | 10 | 8 | .556 | 1.0 | 5–4 | 5–4 | 236 | 210 | +26 | 13.11 | 11.67 |
| 3 | New England Black Wolves – x | 18 | 9 | 9 | .500 | 2.0 | 4–5 | 5–4 | 194 | 242 | −48 | 10.78 | 13.44 |
| 4 | Toronto Rock | 18 | 8 | 10 | .444 | 3.0 | 3–6 | 5–4 | 237 | 216 | +21 | 13.17 | 12.00 |
| 5 | Buffalo Bandits | 18 | 8 | 10 | .444 | 3.0 | 4–5 | 4–5 | 232 | 240 | −8 | 12.89 | 13.33 |

West Division
| P | Team | GP | W | L | PCT | GB | Home | Road | GF | GA | Diff | GF/GP | GA/GP |
|---|---|---|---|---|---|---|---|---|---|---|---|---|---|
| 1 | Saskatchewan Rush – xyz | 18 | 14 | 4 | .778 | 0.0 | 6–3 | 8–1 | 254 | 196 | +58 | 14.11 | 10.89 |
| 2 | Colorado Mammoth – x | 18 | 11 | 7 | .611 | 3.0 | 5–4 | 6–3 | 214 | 199 | +15 | 11.89 | 11.06 |
| 3 | Calgary Roughnecks – x | 18 | 8 | 10 | .444 | 6.0 | 5–4 | 3–6 | 227 | 211 | +16 | 12.61 | 11.72 |
| 4 | Vancouver Stealth | 18 | 2 | 16 | .111 | 12.0 | 0–9 | 2–7 | 186 | 277 | −91 | 10.33 | 15.39 |

x: Clinched playoff berth; c: Clinched playoff berth by crossing over to another division; y: Clinched division; z: Clinched best regular season record; GP: Games Played
W: Wins; L: Losses; GB: Games back; PCT: Win percentage; Home: Record at Home; Road: Record on the Road; GF: Goals scored; GA: Goals allowed
Differential: Difference between goals scored and allowed; GF/GP: Average number of goals scored per game; GA/GP: Average number of goals allowed per game

== Game log ==
| Game | Date | Opponent | Location | Score | OT | Attendance | Record |
|---|---|---|---|---|---|---|---|
| 1 | December 9, 2017 | Calgary Roughnecks | Blue Cross Arena | W 17–6 | | 4,596 | 1–0 |
| 2 | December 23, 2017 | Buffalo Bandits | Blue Cross Arena | W 21–11 | | 7,272 | 2–0 |
| 3 | December 30, 2017 | @ Georgia Swarm | Infinite Energy Arena | L 11–14 | | 6,254 | 2–1 |
| 4 | January 12, 2018 | @ Toronto Rock | Air Canada Centre | L 9–17 | | 7,101 | 2–2 |
| 5 | January 13, 2018 | New England Black Wolves | Blue Cross Arena | L 8–9 | | 6,336 | 2–3 |
| 6 | January 21, 2018 | @ New England Black Wolves | Mohegan Sun Arena | L 9–11 | | 5,373 | 2–4 |
| 7 | February 3, 2018 | Buffalo Bandits | Blue Cross Arena | L 14–16 | | 9,425 | 2–5 |
| 8 | February 10, 2018 | Toronto Rock | Blue Cross Arena | L 9–12 | | 5,439 | 2–6 |
| 9 | February 11, 2018 | @ Georgia Swarm | Infinite Energy Arena | W 17–10 | | 3,181 | 3–6 |
| 10 | February 17, 2018 | Saskatchewan Rush | Blue Cross Arena | W 16–11 | | 6,188 | 4–6 |
| 11 | February 24, 2018 | @ Buffalo Bandits | KeyBank Center | W 17–10 | | 15,302 | 5–6 |
| 12 | March 10, 2018 | Georgia Swarm | Blue Cross Arena | W 11–10 | OT | 7,214 | 6–6 |
| 13 | March 17, 2018 | @ Calgary Roughnecks | Scotiabank Saddledome | L 13–14 | | 15,070 | 6–7 |
| 14 | March 24, 2018 | @ Saskatchewan Rush | SaskTel Centre | W 13–10 | | 14,811 | 7–7 |
| 15 | March 31, 2018 | Colorado Mammoth | Blue Cross Arena | W 16–14 | | 6,228 | 8–7 |
| 16 | April 13, 2018 | @ Toronto Rock | Air Canada Centre | W 14–11 | | 11,463 | 9–7 |
| 17 | April 21, 2018 | New England Black Wolves | Blue Cross Arena | L 6–11 | | 8,143 | 9–8 |
| 18 | April 28, 2018 | @ Buffalo Bandits | KeyBank Center | W 15–13 | | 19,070 | 10–8 |

=== Playoffs ===
| Game | Date | Opponent | Location | Score | OT | Attendance | Record |
|---|---|---|---|---|---|---|---|
| Eastern division semi-final | May 4, 2018 | New England Black Wolves | Blue Cross Arena | W 15–11 | | 5,263 | 1–0 |
| Eastern division final | May 12, 2018 | @ Georgia Swarm | Infinite Energy Arena | W 9–8 | | 4,106 | 2–0 |
| finals (game 1) | May 26, 2018 | @ Saskatchewan Rush | SaskTel Centre | L 9–16 | | 11,842 | 2–1 |
| finals (game 2) | June 2, 2018 | Saskatchewan Rush | Blue Cross Arena | W 13–8 | | 9,174 | 3–1 |
| finals (game 3) | June 9, 2018 | @ Saskatchewan Rush | SaskTel Centre | L 10–15 | | 13,645 | 3–2 |

== Roster ==
Rochester Knighthawks roster
| Active (21-man) roster | | Inactive roster | Coaches |
|---|---|---|---|
| Goaltenders: 48 (Canada) Matt Vinc; 55 (Iroquois) Angus Goodleaf; Defensemen: 2 (Canada) Paul Dawson; 3 (Canada) Billy Dee Smith; 4 (Canada) Graeme Hossack; 16 (Canada) Dylan Evans; 18 (Canada) Jake Withers; 21 (Canada) Eric Shewell; 29 (Canada) Ian Llord; 37 (Canada) Scott Campbell; 45 (Canada) Luc Magnan; 79 (Iroquois) Sid Smith (C) | Forwards: 6 (Canada) Dan Dawson; 11 (Canada) Austin Shanks; 15 (United States) Joe Resetarits; 23 (Canada) Cory Vitarelli; 27 (Canada) Josh Currier; 47 (Iroquois) Kyle Jackson; 61 (Canada) Dan Lomas; 66 (Canada) Eric Fannell; 88 (Iroquois) Cody Jamieson (A) | Practice squad: 7 (Iroquois) Greg Longboat; 33 (Canada) Adam Perroni; 77 (Iroquois) Quinn Powless; 12 (Canada) Mike Triolo; Injured reserve: 10 (Canada) Brad Gillies (D/T); Holdout: (Canada) Brandon Robinson; (Canada) Sean Young | Head coach {{{Head Coach}}} Legend: * Suspended list; (C) Captain; (A) Alternate captain; Roster updated 2018-01-18; NLL Transactions |

=== Entry Draft ===
The 2017 NLL Entry Draft took place on September 18, 2017. The Knighthawks made the following selections:

| Round | Overall | Player | College/Club |
|---|---|---|---|
| 1 | 2 | Jake Withers | |
| 1 | 5 | Austin Shanks | |
| 1 | 6 | Eric Fannell | |
| 2 | 14 | Adam Perroni | |
| 5 | 44 | Trevor Stacey | |
| 6 | 52 | Kessler Doolittle | |

== See also ==
- 2018 NLL season
