= 2018 Colorado Mammoth season =

Sports season

2018 Colorado Mammoth
- League: NLL
- Division: 2nd West
- 2018 record: 11-7
- Home record: 5-4
- Road record: 6-3
- Goals for: 214
- Goals against: 199
- General Manager: Dan Carey
- Coach: Dan Stroup, Pat Coyle, Chris Gill
- Captain: Robert Hope
- Alternate captains: Joey Cupido; Zack Greer
- Arena: Pepsi Center
- Average attendance: 14,077

Team leaders
- Goals: Ryan Benesch (36)
- Assists: Jeremy Noble, Ryan Benesch (57)
- Points: Ryan Benesch (93)
- Penalties in minutes: Robert Hope (22)
- Loose Balls: Robert Hope (151)
- Wins: Dillon Ward (10)
- Goals against average: Steve Fryer (8.55)

The Colorado Mammoth are a lacrosse team based in Denver, Colorado playing in the National Lacrosse League (NLL). The 2018 season is the 32nd in franchise history and 16th as the Mammoth (previously the Washington Power, Pittsburgh Crossefire, and Baltimore Thunder).

== Final standings ==
East Division
P	Team	GP	W	L	PCT	GB	Home	Road	GF	GA	Diff	GF/GP	GA/GP
1	Georgia Swarm – xy	18	11	7	.611	0.0	6–3	5–4	226	215	+11	12.56	11.94
2	Rochester Knighthawks – x	18	10	8	.556	1.0	5–4	5–4	236	210	+26	13.11	11.67
3	New England Black Wolves – x	18	9	9	.500	2.0	4–5	5–4	194	242	−48	10.78	13.44
4	Toronto Rock	18	8	10	.444	3.0	3–6	5–4	237	216	+21	13.17	12.00
5	Buffalo Bandits	18	8	10	.444	3.0	4–5	4–5	232	240	−8	12.89	13.33

West Division
P	Team	GP	W	L	PCT	GB	Home	Road	GF	GA	Diff	GF/GP	GA/GP
1	Saskatchewan Rush – xyz	18	14	4	.778	0.0	6–3	8–1	254	196	+58	14.11	10.89
2	Colorado Mammoth – x	18	11	7	.611	3.0	5–4	6–3	214	199	+15	11.89	11.06
3	Calgary Roughnecks – x	18	8	10	.444	6.0	5–4	3–6	227	211	+16	12.61	11.72
4	Vancouver Stealth	18	2	16	.111	12.0	0–9	2–7	186	277	−91	10.33	15.39

x: Clinched playoff berth; c: Clinched playoff berth by crossing over to another division; y: Clinched division; z: Clinched best regular season record; GP: Games Played
W: Wins; L: Losses; GB: Games back; PCT: Win percentage; Home: Record at Home; Road: Record on the Road; GF: Goals scored; GA: Goals allowed
Differential: Difference between goals scored and allowed; GF/GP: Average number of goals scored per game; GA/GP: Average number of goals allowed per game

== Game log ==
=== Regular season ===
Game	Date	Opponent	Location	Score	OT	Attendance	Record
1	December 8, 2017	@ Vancouver Stealth	Langley Events Centre	W 15–8		3,201	1–0
2	December 23, 2017	Georgia Swarm	Pepsi Center	W 14–11		13,125	2–0
3	December 29, 2017	@ Calgary Roughnecks	Scotiabank Saddledome	W 11–7		9,555	3–0
4	January 13, 2018	Saskatchewan Rush	Pepsi Center	L 12–17		11,085	3–1
5	January 26, 2018	Vancouver Stealth	Pepsi Center	W 14–13		12,016	4–1
6	February 2, 2018	Saskatchewan Rush	Pepsi Center	L 10–13		12,740	4–2
7	February 10, 2018	@ Calgary Roughnecks	Scotiabank Saddledome	L 9–13		11,167	4–3
8	February 18, 2018	@ New England Black Wolves	Mohegan Sun Arena	W 19–11		5,720	5–3
9	March 2, 2018	@ Georgia Swarm	Infinite Energy Center	W 11–10		3,093	6–3
10	March 3, 2018	Buffalo Bandits	Pepsi Center	W 8–7		16,062	7–3
11	March 10, 2018	Calgary Roughnecks	Pepsi Center	W 8–7		15,034	8–3
12	March 17, 2018	@ Vancouver Stealth	Langley Events Centre	W 13–10		3,013	9–3
13	March 24, 2018	Vancouver Stealth	Pepsi Center	L 12–13		15,541	9–4
14	March 30, 2018	@ Toronto Rock	Air Canada Centre	W 11–7		10,288	10–4
15	March 31, 2018	@ Rochester Knighthawks	Blue Cross Arena	L 14–16		6,228	10–5
16	April 7, 2018	@ Saskatchewan Rush	SaskTel Centre	L 8–11		14,971	10–6
17	April 14, 2018	New England Black Wolves	Pepsi Center	L 6–10		15,303	10–7
18	April 28, 2018	Toronto Rock	Pepsi Center	W 19–15		15,787	11–7

=== Playoffs ===
Game	Date	Opponent	Location	Score	OT	Attendance	Record
Western division semi-final	May 5, 2018	Calgary Roughnecks	Pepsi Center	L 12–15		13,884	0–1

== Roster ==
Colorado Mammoth roster
Active (21-man) roster		Inactive roster	Coaches
Goaltenders: 39 (Canada) Steve Fryer; 45 (Canada) Dillon Ward; Defensemen: 82 (Canada) Joey Cupido; 27 (Canada) Scott Carnegie; 8 (United States) Greg Downing; 23 (Canada) Jordan Gilles; 18 (Canada) Robert Hope; 4 (Canada) Josh Sullivan; 94 (Canada) Bryce Sweeting; 11 (United States) Taylor Stuart	Forwards: 7 (Canada) Ryan Benesch; 3 (United States) Tim Edwards; 12 (Canada) Brody Eastwood; 28 (Canada) Stephen Keogh; 16 (Canada) Ryan Lee; 93 (Canada) Quinn MacKay; 51 (Canada) Eli McLaughlin; 35 (Canada) Jeremy Noble; 20 (Canada) Jacob Ruest; 17 (Canada) Chris Wardle	Practice squad: 42 (Canada) Rowan Kelly; 32 (United States) Nick Ossello; Injured reserve: 80 (United States) Brent Adams; Holdout: 25 (Canada) Brad Self; Unable to play: 37 (Canada) Dan Coates (C); 88 (Canada) Zack Greer; 19 (Canada) Cameron Holding (A)	Head coach {{{Head Coach}}} Legend: * Suspended list; (C) Captain; (A) Alternate captain; Roster updated 2018-12-08; NLL Transactions

=== Entry Draft ===
The 2017 NLL Entry Draft took place on September 18, 2017. The Mammoth made the following selections:

Round	Overall	Player	College/Club
3	25	Ryan Lee	
3	28	Connor Cannizzaro	
4	38	Jarrod Neumann	
6	55	Rowan Kelly	

== See also ==
- 2018 NLL season
