= Mitch de Snoo =

Canadian lacrosse player

Personal information
- Nationality: Canadian
- Born: October 22, 1992 (age 33) Oshawa, Ontario
- Height: 6 ft 2 in (188 cm)
- Weight: 220 lb (100 kg; 15 st 10 lb)

Sport
- Position: Defense
- Shoots: Left
- NCAA team: Drexel (2015)
- NLL draft: 13th overall, 2015; Calgary Roughnecks
- NLL team Former teams: Buffalo Bandits; Philadelphia Wings; Toronto Rock
- MSL team: Oakville Rock
- Pro career: 2016–

Career highlights
- 2022 NLL Defensive Player of the Year; 2019 National Lacrosse League Cup Finals; 2016 NLL Champion's Cup Finals; 2014 NCAA Quarterfinals

Mitchell "Mitch" de Snoo (born October 22, 1992) is a Canadian professional box lacrosse player for the Buffalo Bandits of the National Lacrosse League and the Oakville Rock of Major Series Lacrosse. Hailing from Oshawa, Ontario, de Snoo attended Monsignor Paul Dwyer Catholic High School, where he played four years of lacrosse and ice hockey.

== College ==
He played collegiality at Drexel University, where he earned a degree in biomedical engineering. de Snoo was key to Drexel lacrosse making their first NCAA tournament where they upset Penn in the first round. That season, de Snoo scored the game-winner with 46 seconds left in the third overtime beating Penn State 13–12 in a key Colonial Athletic Association game.

== Pro Lacrosse ==
de Snoo played junior lacrosse for the Clarington Green Gaels and the Whitby Warriors, with whom he won the Minto Cup in 2013. He was in the third round (15th overall) in the 2014 MSL draft by the Oakville Rock.

de Snoo was drafted in the second round (13th overall) of the 2015 NLL Entry Draft by the Calgary Roughnecks, and was traded to the Buffalo Bandits on December 28, 2016, in exchange for Brandon Goodwin. On July 6, 2020, de Snoo was traded to the Toronto Rock in exchange for Brock Sorensen, Alex Tulett, & conditional 2022 draft pick.

de Snoo was named Defensive Player of the Year for the NLL's 2021–2022 season. Heading into the 2023 NLL season, Inside Lacrosse named de Snoo the #2 best defender in the NLL.

On February 25, 2025, de Snoo, along with teammate Chris Corbeil, were traded by the Rock to the Philadelphia Wings in exchange for a 2025 first round pick.

On November 26, 2025, de Snoo was traded by the Wings to the Buffalo Bandits in exchange for a conditional 2026 first round pick, and a conditional 2028 second round pick.

Off the floor, de Snoo earned a master's degree in laboratory medicine and pathobiology from the University of Toronto, having done research into genetic inheritable forms of Parkinson's. Currently, he is pursuing a medical degree at the University of Toronto.

He resides in Toronto with his wife, Meg de Snoo, and their dog.

== Statistics ==
NCAA

		Regular Season
Season	Team	GP	G	A	Pts
2012	Drexel	16	0	0	0
2013	Drexel	15	4	0	4
2014	Drexel	18	5	2	7
2015	Drexel	15	7	1	8
College totals		64	16	3	19

NLL

		Regular Season						Playoffs
Season	Team	GP	G	A	Pts	LB	PIM	GP	G	A	Pts	LB	PIM
2026	Buffalo	14	3	8	11	144	4	1	1	1	2	9	2
2025	Philadelphia	7	3	3	6	96	0	--	--	--	--	--	--
2025	Toronto	11	6	7	13	109	27	--	--	--	--	--	--
2024	Toronto	17	8	13	21	164	30	3	0	1	1	23	8
2023	Toronto	11	10	9	19	102	13	--	--	--	--	--	--
2022	Toronto	16	5	6	11	121	10	2	0	1	1	19	0
2021	Toronto	11	3	7	10	53	9	3	1	1	2	12	2
2020	Buffalo	11	1	5	6	86	25	1	0	1	1	6	0
2019	Buffalo	17	5	9	14	131	25	4	0	1	1	28	14
2018	Buffalo	16	3	12	15	127	39	--	--	--	--	--	--
2017	Buffalo	18	3	12	15	111	42	--	--	--	--	--	--
2016	Buffalo	16	1	7	8	98	8	4	0	0	0	20	10
NLL totals		156	51	97	148	1,358	265	18	4	7	11	140	42

== See also ==
- Drexel Dragons men's lacrosse
- 2014 NCAA Division I men's lacrosse tournament
