= Ray Greene (lacrosse) =

American lacrosse player (1923–1987)

Biographical details
- Born: August 18, 1923; Baltimore, Maryland
- Died: February 16, 1987 (aged 63)

Playing career
- 1942–1948: Johns Hopkins, Drexel University
- Position: Midfielder

Coaching career (HC unless noted)
- 1951–1953: St. Paul's School

Accomplishments and honors

Championships
- 1947 USILA National Championship; 1948 USILA National Championship

Awards
- 1943 First Team All-American; 1948 First Team All-American

Melvin R. "Ray" Greene, Jr. (August 18, 1923 – February 16, 1987) was an American lacrosse player. He was inducted into the National Lacrosse Hall of Fame in 1981.

== Early life and college ==
Greene attended St. Paul's School in Brooklandville, Maryland, where he was a four-year letterwinner on the varsity lacrosse team. Greene was coached by Hall of Fame coach Howdy Myers at St. Paul's. Ray Greene was Drexel University’s first All-American, earning First Team Honors in 1943. After the 1943 season, Ray reported for military service in the Navy and when the war ended, he resumed his lacrosse career at Johns Hopkins University.

At Johns Hopkins University, Greene played lacrosse as a midfielder. He played on the Blue Jays' national championship teams in 1947 and 1948. The United States Intercollegiate Lacrosse Association named him a First Team All-American midfielder in 1947. The following season, the USILA again named Greene to the USILA first team. Ray was credited by Bob Scott in his book, Lacrosse: Technique and Tradition, with scoring the winning goal in the 1948 Navy game. Greene participated in the 1943, 1947 and 1948 North/South Collegiate All-Star Games.

From 1949 through 1951 Ray played for the National Open Champions Mt. Washington Lacrosse Club and was selected by Kid Norris to his All Time Mt. Washington Team. During this time he also coached lacrosse at St. Paul's School. He was considered one of the five greatest lacrosse players of all time.

Among his team mates were numerous future lacrosse Hall of Famers, including Jim Adams.

Greene spent two years coaching at his prep alma mater, St. Paul's School, where he led the team to 10–2 and 9–1 records in 1949 and 1950, respectively. He also taught sixth grade math at St. Paul's. Greene is among 18 players or coaches from St. Paul's in the National Lacrosse Hall of Fame, including Jim Adams, Scott Bacigalupo, Jeff Cook, Howdy Myers, and Don Zimmerman.

Greene's children were Fadra Lee Greene, Chip Greene, and Rich Greene; grandchildren, Fadra Christine, Lauren, Taylor, Cameron, Chance, Brayson and Farrah.

== See also ==
- Lacrosse in Pennsylvania
