= National Intercollegiate Running Club Association =

The National Intercollegiate Running Club Association (NIRCA) is the National governing body for club level collegiate cross country, road running and track and field clubs at over 50 colleges and universities across the U.S.

== History ==
On campus running clubs existed at various schools prior to the formation of the NIRCA. The Ball State Runners Association dated to October 2003 and hosted the MC5 meet as early as 2004 which set the trend. The official organization was formed during the National Club Cross Country Conference at Ohio State University in May, 2006. That resulted in the first national championship meet held at Penn State University on November 4, 2006.

== Major meets ==
There are several major meets held by NIRCA, including regional and national cross country championships, and an outdoor track and field and half marathon championship meet. The 2020 outdoor track championship meet, set to be hosted in Oxford, Ohio, was cancelled due to the Coronavirus Pandemic.

== Divisions ==
The organization is broken down into 7 regional divisions, each hosting their own regional championship.

- Heartland
- Great Lakes
- Great Plains
- Mid-Atlantic
- Northeast
- Pacific
- Southeast
