= Robert Church (lacrosse) =

Canadian lacrosse player (born 1988)

Personal information
- Nickname: Milk Man
- Nationality: Canadian
- Born: November 18, 1991 (age 34) Coquitlam, BC, CAN
- Height: 5 ft 10 in (178 cm)
- Weight: 197 lb (89 kg; 14 st 1 lb)

Sport
- Position: Forward
- Shoots: Right
- NCAA team: Drexel (2013)
- NLL draft: 5th overall, 2013; Edmonton Rush
- NLL team Former teams: Saskatchewan Rush; Edmonton Rush
- WLA team: Burnaby Lakers
- Pro career: 2013–
Medal record
Representing Canada
Men's box lacrosse
World Lacrosse Box Championships
Winner	2024 Utica

Robert Church (born August 29, 1988) is a Canadian professional box lacrosse player for the Saskatchewan Rush in the National Lacrosse League.

== Early life ==
Church is the son of Nancy and Bruce Church. He grew up in Coquitlam, BC and began playing lacrosse when he was 11. He attended Dr. Charles Best Secondary School where he graduated with honors, was the B.C. High School MVP and played on the provincial championship team. After high school he transitioned into B.C. Intermediate A Lacrosse League and was named MVP in 2008 where he scored 106 points.

== Junior career ==
Robert played his Jr A Lacrosse career for the Coquitlam Adanacs of the British Columbia Junior A Lacrosse League. He was the 2009 BCJALL Most Valuable Player leading the league with 107 points and was a First Team All-Star. He was named MVP of the 2010 Minto Cup. Church helped his Jr club reach three consecutive Minto Cups in 2010, 2011, and 2012.

== College career ==
Church is a graduate from Drexel University. During his tenure there, he set the record for most goals scored in a game by a Drexel Dragon's player since 1996, scoring seven goals as a freshman against Hofstra in an upset victory. Church earned Rookie of the Week four times, as a result he was named to the NCAA's All-Rookie Team.

Church finished fourth all time in Drexel scoring with 194 career points. As a senior, Church was selected a Division I honorable mention All American.

Church was named to the men's lacrosse program 75th Anniversary all-time team.

== Professional career ==
Robert was the 5th overall draft pick, going to the Edmonton Rush in the 2013 NLL Entry Draft. Named to the NLL's 2014 All-Rookie Team; finishing third in the NLL rookie scoring race with 52 goals and 31 assists. In 2017, he finished second in team scoring and 15th in the league during regular season, and in the playoffs finished second on the team and second in the league in scoring. In the same year, Church scored 23 power-play goals to lead the NLL for a second consecutive season. Finished tied for 10th overall in league scoring with 92 points in 2015 and was third in the league with 14 power-play goals; tied with Rush teammate and former Coquitlam Adanacs Jr A teammate Ben McIntosh for 12th in the league with 37 goals. He has won 3 National Lacrosse League Championships in 2015, 2016, and 2018.

Church led the NLL in 2016 with 17 power-play goals and finished tied for 14th in league scoring with 86 points.

== Statistics ==
=== NLL ===
[]		Regular season									Playoffs								
Season	Team	GP	G	A	Pts	LB	PIM	Pts/GP	LB/GP	PIM/GP	GP	G	A	Pts	LB	PIM	Pts/GP	LB/GP	PIM/GP
2014	Edmonton Rush	17	21	31	52	51	2	3.06	3.00	0.12	3	2	2	4	5	2	1.33	1.67	0.67
2015	Edmonton Rush	17	37	55	92	75	4	5.41	4.41	0.24	4	8	7	15	7	0	3.75	1.75	0.00
2016	Saskatchewan Rush	18	35	51	86	98	7	4.78	5.44	0.39	4	8	12	20	15	2	5.00	3.75	0.50
2017	Saskatchewan Rush	18	35	42	77	57	2	4.28	3.17	0.11	4	10	15	25	15	0	6.25	3.75	0.00
2018	Saskatchewan Rush	18	47	60	107	72	6	5.94	4.00	0.33	5	10	15	25	14	0	5.00	2.80	0.00
2019	Saskatchewan Rush	17	25	42	67	66	2	3.94	3.88	0.12	1	2	0	2	4	0	2.00	4.00	0.00
2020	Saskatchewan Rush	10	17	24	41	41	2	4.10	4.10	0.20	–	–	–	–	–	–	–	–	–
2022	Saskatchewan Rush	18	38	56	94	42	4	5.22	2.33	0.22	–	–	–	–	–	–	–	–	–
2023	Saskatchewan Rush	18	51	52	103	82	8	5.72	4.56	0.44	–	–	–	–	–	–	–	–	–
		151	306	413	719	584	37	4.76	3.87	0.25	21	40	51	91	60	4	4.33	2.86	0.19
Career Total:		172	346	464	810	644	41	4.71	3.74	0.24									

GP–Games played; G–Goals; A–Assists; Pts–Points; LB–Loose balls; PIM–Penalty minutes; Pts/GP–Points per games played; LB/GP–Loose balls per games played; PIM/GP–Penalty minutes per games played.

== NCAA Statistics ==
		Regular Season
Season	Team	GP	G	A	Pts
2010	Drexel	14	32	9	41
2011	Drexel	14	27	21	48
2012	Drexel	16	29	18	47
2013	Drexel	15	33	24	57
College totals		59	121	72	193

== Awards ==
- 2009 BC Jr A Lacrosse League MVP
- 2009 BC Jr A Lacrosse League Rookie of the Year
- 2010 CAA All-Rookie Team
- 2010 Minto Cup Champion (Coquitlam Adanacs)
- 2010 Minto Cup MVP (Coquitlam Adanacs)
- 2014 Western Lacrosse Association MVP (Burnaby Lakers)
- 2017 Western Lacrosse Association MVP (Burnaby Lakers)
- 2019 Western Lacrosse Association MVP (Burnaby Lakers)
- 2012 Second Team All-CAA (Drexel Dragons)
- 2013 First Team All-CAA (Drexel Dragons)
- 2013 Honorable Mention All-American (Drexel Dragons)
- 2014 NLL All-Rookie Team
- 2015 NLL Champions Cup Winner (Edmonton Rush)
- 2016 NLL Champions Cup Winner (Saskatchewan Rush)
- 2018 1st Team NLL All-Pro
- 2018 NLL Cup Winner (Saskatchewan Rush)

== See also ==
- Drexel Dragons men's lacrosse
