= 2022 New York Riptide season =

NLL season

2022 New York Riptide
- League: NLL
- Division: 7th East
- 2022 record: 6-12
- Home record: 3-6
- Road record: 3-6
- Goals for: 214
- Goals against: 226
- General Manager: Jim Veltman
- Coach: Dan Ladouceur
- Captain: Dan MacRae
- Arena: Nassau Coliseum
- Average attendance: 4,267

Team leaders
- Goals: Callum Crawford (39)
- Assists: Jeff Teat (71)
- Points: Jeff Teat (108)
- Penalties in minutes: Brent Noseworthy (29)
- Loose Balls: Scott Dominey (120)
- Wins: Steven Orleman (6)
- Goals against average: Steven Orleman (12.10)

The New York Riptide are a lacrosse team based in Uniondale, New York playing in the National Lacrosse League (NLL). The 2022 season is the team's 2nd season in the league.

== Regular season ==
=== Current standings ===
East Conference
P	Team	GP	W	L	PCT	GB	Home	Road	GF	GA	Diff	GF/GP	GA/GP
1	Buffalo Bandits – xyz	18	14	4	.778	0.0	7–2	7–2	247	185	+62	13.72	10.28
2	Toronto Rock – x	18	13	5	.722	1.0	7–2	6–3	207	166	+41	11.50	9.22
3	Halifax Thunderbirds – x	18	11	7	.611	3.0	7–2	4–5	198	195	+3	11.00	10.83
4	Albany FireWolves – x	18	9	9	.500	5.0	5–4	4–5	198	195	+3	11.00	10.83
5	Philadelphia Wings – x	18	9	9	.500	5.0	4–5	5–4	185	199	−14	10.28	11.06
6	Georgia Swarm	18	9	9	.500	5.0	4–5	5–4	205	212	−7	11.39	11.78
7	New York Riptide	18	6	12	.333	8.0	3–6	3–6	214	226	−12	11.89	12.56
8	Rochester Knighthawks	18	4	14	.222	10.0	2–7	2–7	184	221	−37	10.22	12.28

West Conference
P	Team	GP	W	L	PCT	GB	Home	Road	GF	GA	Diff	GF/GP	GA/GP
1	San Diego Seals – xy	18	10	8	.556	0.0	5–4	5–4	202	183	+19	11.22	10.17
2	Calgary Roughnecks – x	18	10	8	.556	0.0	6–3	4–5	194	201	−7	10.78	11.17
3	Colorado Mammoth – x	18	10	8	.556	0.0	7–2	3–6	196	198	−2	10.89	11.00
4	Saskatchewan Rush	18	8	10	.444	2.0	6–3	2–7	196	194	+2	10.89	10.78
5	Panther City Lacrosse Club	18	7	11	.389	3.0	3–6	4–5	190	223	−33	10.56	12.39
6	Vancouver Warriors	18	6	12	.333	4.0	3–6	3–6	199	209	−10	11.06	11.61

== Game log ==
Game	Date	Opponent	Location	Score	OT	Attendance	Record
1	December 4, 2021	Rochester Knighthawks	Nassau Coliseum	L 12–13	OT	4,494	0–1
2	December 10, 2021	@ Philadelphia Wings	Wells Fargo Center	L 12–14		3,709	0–2
3	December 12, 2021	Georgia Swarm	Nassau Coliseum	L 10–14		3,205	0–3
4	January 15, 2022	Panther City Lacrosse Club	Nassau Coliseum	L 12–13		3,401	0–4
5	January 23, 2022	@ Philadelphia Wings	Wells Fargo Center	W 13–12		6,206	1–4
6	January 29, 2022	Buffalo Bandits	Nassau Coliseum	L 17–18		4,051	1–5
7	February 4, 2022	@ Halifax Thunderbirds	Scotiabank Centre	L 10–13			1–6
8	February 12, 2022	@ Georgia Swarm	Gas South Arena	L 11–13		9,188	1–7
9	February 26, 2022	Toronto Rock	Nassau Coliseum	W 14–13		3,956	2–7
10	March 5, 2022	@ Toronto Rock	FirstOntario Centre	L 9–12		7,920	2–8
11	March 12, 2022	@ Rochester Knighthawks	Blue Cross Arena	W 15–12		3,790	3–8
12	March 26, 2022	Albany FireWolves	Nassau Coliseum	W 15–6		4,967	4–8
13	April 2, 2022	Philadelphia Wings	Nassau Coliseum	L 5–11		4,669	4–9
14	April 4, 2022	@ Colorado Mammoth	Ball Arena	L 7–10		6,549	4–10
15	April 9, 2022	@ Buffalo Bandits	KeyBank Center	W 15–12		12,436	5–10
16	April 16, 2022	Rochester Knighthawks	Nassau Coliseum	W 15–7		4,689	6–10
17	April 23, 2022	Halifax Thunderbirds	Nassau Coliseum	L 13–16		4,968	6–11
18	April 30, 2022	@ Albany FireWolves	MVP Arena	L 9–17		6,663	6–12

== Roster ==
New York Riptide roster
Active (21-man) roster		Inactive roster	Coaches
Goaltenders: 12 (United States) Gowah Abrams; 27 (Canada) Alex Buque; Defensemen: 3 (Canada) Dan MacRae (C); 5 (United States) Mike Manley; 11 (Canada) Andrew Suitor; 14 (Haudenosaunee) Tyson Bomberry; 31 (United States) John Ranagan (A); 44 (Canada) Ethan Schott; 88 (Canada) Scott Johnston	Forwards: 1 (United States) Connor Kelly; 4 (Canada) Dan Lomas; 6 (United States) Kieran McArdle; 8 (Haudenosaunee) Travis Longboat; 18 (Israel) Jean Luc-Chetner; 19 (Canada) Tyson Gibson; 41 (Canada) Pat Saunders; 71 (United States) Gale Thorpe; 97 (Canada) John Wagner; Transition: 9 (United States) Alex Woodall; 57 (United States) Cody Radziewicz; 81 (Canada) Ryan Fournier	Practice squad: 15 (United States) Myles Jones; 25 (United States) Connor Farrell; 45 (Haudenosaunee) Jake Fox; Injured reserve: (United States) Jack Rowlett; (Haudenosaunee) Angus Goodleaf; Holdout: (Canada) Dawson Theede	Head coach: Regy Thorpe; Assistant coaches: Marshall Abrams; Joe Smith; Legend: * Suspended list; (C) Captain; (A) Alternate captain; updated 2020-02-15; NLL Transactions

=== Entry Draft ===
The 2021 NLL Entry Draft took place on August 28, 2021. The Riptide made the following selections:

Round	Overall	Player	College/Club
2	21	Jack Kelly	Oakville Rock MSL/Penn State
3	34	Will Johnston	Toronto Jr. A
4	56	Bryce Tolmie	Clarington Jr. B/Hofstra
5	65	Tristan Hanna	Toronto Jr. A/Cleveland State
6	78	Kyle Gallagher	Notre Dame
6	79	Jacob Martino	Oakville Jr. A
