= 2022 Georgia Swarm season =

2022 Georgia Swarm
- League: NLL
- Division: East
- 2022 record: 9-9
- Home record: 4-5
- Road record: 5-4
- Goals for: 205
- Goals against: 212
- General Manager: John J. Arlotta
- Coach: Ed Comeau
- Arena: Gas South Arena

The 2022 Georgia Swarm season is the 6th season of the Georgia Swarm, a lacrosse team based in Duluth, Georgia playing in the National Lacrosse League. The team was formerly based in Saint Paul, Minnesota and was known as the Minnesota Swarm.

== Regular season ==
=== Current standings ===
East Conference
| P | Team | GP | W | L | PCT | GB | Home | Road | GF | GA | Diff | GF/GP | GA/GP |
|---|---|---|---|---|---|---|---|---|---|---|---|---|---|
| 1 | Buffalo Bandits – xyz | 18 | 14 | 4 | .778 | 0.0 | 7–2 | 7–2 | 247 | 185 | +62 | 13.72 | 10.28 |
| 2 | Toronto Rock – x | 18 | 13 | 5 | .722 | 1.0 | 7–2 | 6–3 | 207 | 166 | +41 | 11.50 | 9.22 |
| 3 | Halifax Thunderbirds – x | 18 | 11 | 7 | .611 | 3.0 | 7–2 | 4–5 | 198 | 195 | +3 | 11.00 | 10.83 |
| 4 | Albany FireWolves – x | 18 | 9 | 9 | .500 | 5.0 | 5–4 | 4–5 | 198 | 195 | +3 | 11.00 | 10.83 |
| 5 | Philadelphia Wings – x | 18 | 9 | 9 | .500 | 5.0 | 4–5 | 5–4 | 185 | 199 | −14 | 10.28 | 11.06 |
| 6 | Georgia Swarm | 18 | 9 | 9 | .500 | 5.0 | 4–5 | 5–4 | 205 | 212 | −7 | 11.39 | 11.78 |
| 7 | New York Riptide | 18 | 6 | 12 | .333 | 8.0 | 3–6 | 3–6 | 214 | 226 | −12 | 11.89 | 12.56 |
| 8 | Rochester Knighthawks | 18 | 4 | 14 | .222 | 10.0 | 2–7 | 2–7 | 184 | 221 | −37 | 10.22 | 12.28 |

West Conference
| P | Team | GP | W | L | PCT | GB | Home | Road | GF | GA | Diff | GF/GP | GA/GP |
|---|---|---|---|---|---|---|---|---|---|---|---|---|---|
| 1 | San Diego Seals – xy | 18 | 10 | 8 | .556 | 0.0 | 5–4 | 5–4 | 202 | 183 | +19 | 11.22 | 10.17 |
| 2 | Calgary Roughnecks – x | 18 | 10 | 8 | .556 | 0.0 | 6–3 | 4–5 | 194 | 201 | −7 | 10.78 | 11.17 |
| 3 | Colorado Mammoth – x | 18 | 10 | 8 | .556 | 0.0 | 7–2 | 3–6 | 196 | 198 | −2 | 10.89 | 11.00 |
| 4 | Saskatchewan Rush | 18 | 8 | 10 | .444 | 2.0 | 6–3 | 2–7 | 196 | 194 | +2 | 10.89 | 10.78 |
| 5 | Panther City Lacrosse Club | 18 | 7 | 11 | .389 | 3.0 | 3–6 | 4–5 | 190 | 223 | −33 | 10.56 | 12.39 |
| 6 | Vancouver Warriors | 18 | 6 | 12 | .333 | 4.0 | 3–6 | 3–6 | 199 | 209 | −10 | 11.06 | 11.61 |

== Game log ==
| Game | Date | Opponent | Location | Score | OT | Attendance | Record |
|---|---|---|---|---|---|---|---|
| 1 | December 4, 2021 | Colorado Mammoth | Gas South Arena | L 11–16 | | 5,127 | 0–1 |
| 2 | December 12, 2021 | @ New York Riptide | Nassau Coliseum | W 14–10 | | 3,205 | 1–1 |
| 3 | January 8, 2022 | @ Philadelphia Wings | Wells Fargo Center | L 11–12 | OT | 5,549 | 1–2 |
| 4 | January 14, 2022 | @ Buffalo Bandits | KeyBank Center | L 10–12 | | 7,744 | 1–3 |
| 5 | January 21, 2022 | @ Rochester Knighthawks | Blue Cross Arena | W 12–8 | | 3,157 | 2–3 |
| 6 | January 29, 2022 | Philadelphia Wings | Gas South Arena | L 7–8 | | 7,353 | 2–4 |
| 7 | February 4, 2022 | Albany FireWolves | Gas South Arena | W 14–13 | | 7,352 | 3–4 |
| 8 | February 5, 2022 | @ Albany FireWolves | MVP Arena | L 11–13 | | 5,297 | 3–5 |
| 9 | February 12, 2022 | New York Riptide | Gas South Arena | W 13–11 | | 9,188 | 4–5 |
| 10 | February 19, 2022 | @ Halifax Thunderbirds | Scotiabank Centre | L 10–15 | | 3,000 | 4–6 |
| 11 | March 4, 2022 | Rochester Knighthawks | Gas South Arena | W 17–16 | | 7,122 | 5–6 |
| 12 | March 12, 2022 | Halifax Thunderbirds | Gas South Arena | W 10–9 | | 8,546 | 6–6 |
| 13 | March 19, 2022 | @ Albany FireWolves | MVP Arena | W 15–12 | | 6,076 | 7–6 |
| 14 | March 26, 2022 | @ Toronto Rock | FirstOntario Centre | W 10–6 | | 8,841 | 8–6 |
| 15 | April 1, 2022 | Toronto Rock | Gas South Arena | L 9–13 | | 9,399 | 8–7 |
| 16 | April 16, 2022 | Buffalo Bandits | Gas South Arena | L 9–18 | | 9,374 | 8–8 |
| 17 | April 23, 2022 | @ Panther City Lacrosse Club | Dickies Arena | W 12–9 | | 3,959 | 9–8 |
| 18 | April 30, 2022 | Philadelphia Wings | Gas South Arena | L 10–11 | | 9,428 | 9–9 |

== Roster ==
Georgia Swarm roster
| Active (21-man) roster | | Inactive roster | Coaches |
|---|---|---|---|
| Goaltenders: 29 (Canada) Kevin Orleman; 30 (Canada) Mike Poulin; Defensemen: 10 (Canada) Alex Crepinsek; 33 (United States) Matt Dunn; 45 (Canada) Jason Noble (A); 13 (Canada) Connor Sellars; 25 (Canada) Leo Stouros; 44 (Canada) Chad Tutton; 11 (United States) Joel White; 27 (Canada) Adam Wiedemann | Forwards: 20 (Canada) Jordan Hall; 32 (Canada) Shayne Jackson (A); 3 (Haudenosaunee) Zach Miller; 83 (Haudenosaunee) Randy Staats; 4 (Haudenosaunee) Lyle Thompson; 2 (Haudenosaunee) Miles Thompson; 28 (Haudenosaunee) Zed Williams; Transition: 21 (Haudenosaunee) Brendan Bomberry; 24 (Canada) Jordan MacIntosh (C); 71 (Canada) Ryan MacSpadyen; 15 (Haudenosaunee) Kason Tarbell | Practice squad: 91 (United States) TJ Comizio (D); 34 (Canada) Steven Orleman (G); 16 (United States) Sergio Perkovic (D); Injured reserve: 55 (Canada) Bryan Cole (T); Unable to play: (Canada) Jordan Gillis (D); (Canada) Justin Lemcke (D) | Head coach: Ed Comeau; Assistant coaches: Sean Ferris; Dan Ladouceur; Legend: * Suspended list; (C) Captain; (A) Alternate captain; Roster updated 2019-07-01; NLL Transactions |

=== Entry Draft ===
The 2021 NLL Entry Draft took place on August 28, 2021. The Swarm made the following selections:

| Round | Overall | Player | College/Club |
|---|---|---|---|
| 1 | 2 | Ryan Lanchbury | Burlington Jr. A/University of Richmond |
| 2 | 24 | Jordan Ackie | KW Jr. A/Maryville University |
| 2 | 25 | Aden Walsh | Oakville Jr. A/Harford CC |
| 2 | 30 | Thomas Semple | Coquitlam/Denver |
| 2 | 32 | Will Cecile | Burlington Jr. A |
| 3 | 37 | Devin Pipher | Mimico Jr. A/Mercyhurst |
| 3 | 41 | Owen Russell | Victoria Jr. A |
| 3 | 42 | Morrison Mirer | Notre Dame |
| 5 | 71 | Wheaton Jackoboice | Notre Dame |
| 6 | 85 | Brad Apgar | Salisbury |
