= 2022 Buffalo Bandits season =

Results of New York state lacrosse team

2022 Buffalo Bandits
- East Division Champions
- League: NLL
- Division: 1st East
- 2022 record: 14–4
- Home record: 7–2
- Road record: 7–2
- Goals for: 247
- Goals against: 185
- General Manager: Steve Dietrich
- Coach: John Tavares
- Captain: Steve Priolo
- Alternate captains: Dhane Smith, Kevin Brownell
- Arena: KeyBank Center

Team leaders
- Goals: Dhane Smith (41)
- Assists: Dhane Smith (94)
- Points: Dhane Smith (135)
- Penalties in minutes: Tehoka Nanticoke (47)
- Loose Balls: Steve Priolo (116)
- Wins: Matt Vinc (14)
- Goals against average: Matt Vinc (10.10)

The Buffalo Bandits are a lacrosse team based in Buffalo, New York, playing in the National Lacrosse League (NLL). The 2022 season was their 30th season in the NLL. The Bandits returned to play after the entire 2021 season was cancelled due to Covid 19. They started the season on December 4 at home, defeating the Calgary Roughnecks, 16–9.

Buffalo got out to a hot start, starting with a 6–0 record, before falling to the Toronto Rock on February 12, by a score of 12–10. The Bandits then won seven straight following the loss, bringing their record to a league-best 13–1 record, after defeating the Philadelphia Wings on March 31. Despite losing three of their final four games of the regular season, Buffalo finished the regular season with a 14–4 record, the best record in the NLL for the season.

In the playoffs, Buffalo took down the Albany FireWolves in the Eastern Conference Quarterfinals, which was then followed up with a 2 games to none sweep of the Toronto Rock in the Eastern Conference Finals, allowing the Bandits to advance to the NLL Finals for the first time since 2019, where they would face the Colorado Mammoth.

Unfortunately, the Bandits could not win the championship, as they lost two straight games after winning Game 1 of the Finals at home. The loss in the NLL Finals extended their championship drought to 14 years.

== Regular season ==
NLL Standings Reference:

East Conference
P	Team	GP	W	L	PCT	GB	Home	Road	GF	GA	Diff	GF/GP	GA/GP
1	Buffalo Bandits – xyz	18	14	4	.778	0.0	7–2	7–2	247	185	+62	13.72	10.28
2	Toronto Rock – x	18	13	5	.722	1.0	7–2	6–3	207	166	+41	11.50	9.22
3	Halifax Thunderbirds – x	18	11	7	.611	3.0	7–2	4–5	198	195	+3	11.00	10.83
4	Albany FireWolves – x	18	9	9	.500	5.0	5–4	4–5	198	195	+3	11.00	10.83
5	Philadelphia Wings – x	18	9	9	.500	5.0	4–5	5–4	185	199	−14	10.28	11.06
6	Georgia Swarm	18	9	9	.500	5.0	4–5	5–4	205	212	−7	11.39	11.78
7	New York Riptide	18	6	12	.333	8.0	3–6	3–6	214	226	−12	11.89	12.56
8	Rochester Knighthawks	18	4	14	.222	10.0	2–7	2–7	184	221	−37	10.22	12.28

West Conference
P	Team	GP	W	L	PCT	GB	Home	Road	GF	GA	Diff	GF/GP	GA/GP
1	San Diego Seals – xy	18	10	8	.556	0.0	5–4	5–4	202	183	+19	11.22	10.17
2	Calgary Roughnecks – x	18	10	8	.556	0.0	6–3	4–5	194	201	−7	10.78	11.17
3	Colorado Mammoth – x	18	10	8	.556	0.0	7–2	3–6	196	198	−2	10.89	11.00
4	Saskatchewan Rush	18	8	10	.444	2.0	6–3	2–7	196	194	+2	10.89	10.78
5	Panther City Lacrosse Club	18	7	11	.389	3.0	3–6	4–5	190	223	−33	10.56	12.39
6	Vancouver Warriors	18	6	12	.333	4.0	3–6	3–6	199	209	−10	11.06	11.61

== Game log ==
Game	Date	Opponent	Location	Score	OT	Attendance	Record
1	December 4, 2021	Calgary Roughnecks	KeyBank Center	W 16–9		7,395	1–0
2	December 11, 2021	@ Rochester Knighthawks	Blue Cross Arena	W 12–8		4,311	2–0
3	January 8, 2022	Toronto Rock	KeyBank Center	W 12–6		8,005	3–0
4	January 14, 2022	Georgia Swarm	KeyBank Center	W 12–10		7,744	4–0
5	January 30, 2022	@ New York Riptide	Nassau Coliseum	W 18–17	OT	4,051	5–0
6	February 5, 2022	Rochester Knighthawks	KeyBank Center	W 11–8		9,371	6–0
7	February 12, 2022	@ Toronto Rock	FirstOntario Centre	L 10–12			6–1
8	February 18, 2022	Albany FireWolves	KeyBank Center	W 13–8		8,241	7–1
9	February 26, 2022	@ Rochester Knighthawks	Blue Cross Arena	W 14–8		4,830	8–1
10	March 5, 2022	@ Albany FireWolves	Times Union Center	W 12–11	OT	6,011	9–1
11	March 12, 2022	Philadelphia Wings	KeyBank Center	W 17–5		11,451	10–1
12	March 26, 2022	Halifax Thunderbirds	KeyBank Center	W 16–11		11,169	11–1
13	March 27, 2022	@ Halifax Thunderbirds	Scotiabank Centre	W 16–11		5,715	12–1
14	March 31, 2022	@ Philadelphia Wings	Wells Fargo Center	W 17–12		10,699	13–1
15	April 2, 2022	@ Colorado Mammoth	Ball Arena	L 14–15		9,601	13–2
16	April 9, 2022	New York Riptide	KeyBank Center	L 12–15		12,436	13–3
17	April 16, 2022	@ Georgia Swarm	Gas South Arena	W 18–9		9,374	14–3
18	April 30, 2022	Toronto Rock	KeyBank Center	L 7–10		13,481	14–4

=== Playoffs ===
Game	Date	Opponent	Location	Score	OT	Attendance	Record
Eastern Conference Quarterfinals	May 7, 2022	Albany FireWolves	KeyBank Center	W 10–5		12,535	1–0
Eastern Conference Finals (Game 1)	May 15, 2022	Toronto Rock	KeyBank Center	W 18–17		10,258	2–0
Eastern Conference Finals (Game 2)	May 21, 2022	@ Toronto Rock	FirstOntario Centre	W 10–9		7,992	3–0
NLL Finals (Game 1)	June 3, 2022	Colorado Mammoth	KeyBank Center	W 15–14		14,274	4–0
NLL Finals (Game 2)	June 11, 2022	@ Colorado Mammoth	Ball Arena	L 8–11		10,082	4–1
NLL Finals (Game 3)	June 18, 2022	Colorado Mammoth	KeyBank Center	L 8–10		19,060	4–2

== Roster ==
Buffalo Bandits roster
Active (21-man) roster		Inactive roster	Coaches
Goaltenders: 48 (Canada) Matt Vinc; 57 (Canada) Doug Buchan; Defensemen: 21 (Canada) Justin Martin; 23 (Canada) Steve Priolo (C); 25 (Canada) Matt Spanger; 37 (Canada) Ethan O'Connor; 53 (Canada) Justin Robinson; 94 (Canada) Bryce Sweeting	Forwards: 1 (Haudenosaunee) Tehoka Nanticoke; 2 (Canada) Chris Cloutier; 5 (United States) Connor Fields; 10 (Canada) Brad McCulley; 22 (Canada) Josh Byrne; 91 (Canada) Kyle Buchanan; 92 (Canada) Dhane Smith (A); 95 (Canada) Chase Fraser; Transition: 4 (Canada) Ian MacKay; 6 (United States) Max Adler; 8 (Canada) Kevin Brownell (A); 15 (Canada) Brent Noseworthy; 17 (Canada) Jordan Stouros; 20 (Canada) Nick Weiss	Practice squad: 13 (Canada) Sam LaRoue; 27 (United States) Dalton Sulver; 30 (Republic of Ireland) Devlin Shanahan; 49 (Jamaica) Marcus Minichiello; Injured reserve: 44 (Canada) Nathaniel Kozevnikov; Holdout: (Canada) Alec Tulett; Unable to play: (Canada) Joel Matthews; 83 (Haudenosaunee) Frank Brown	Head coach: John Tavares; Assistant coaches: Steve Dietrich; Anthony Cosmo; Eric Vinc; Equipment Manager: Ted Cordingley; Legend: * Suspended list; (C) Captain; (A) Alternate captain; Roster updated 2022-02-11; NLL Transactions

=== Entry Draft ===
The 2021 NLL Entry Draft took place on August 28, 2021. The Bandits made the following selections:

Round	Overall	Player	College/Club
1	3	Tehoka Nanticoke	Six Nations MSL/University of Albany
1	14	Thomas Vaesen	Nanaimo Jr. A/Montevello University
2	26	Colin Munro	Coquitlam Jr. A/Georgetown
4	57	Carson Rees	Maple Ridge WLA/Chestnut Hill
4	62	Nicholas Miller	Hawkeyes UCBLL/St. John Fisher College
5	73	Kyle Hebert	New Westminster WLA/Stony Brook
6	86	Hunter Aggus	Six Nations Jr. A/Paris ALL

== Player stats ==
= Indicates team leader

= Indicates league leader

=== Runners (Top 10) ===
Player	GP	G	A	Pts	LB	PIM
Dhane Smith	18	41	94	135	93	10
Josh Byrne	18	37	62	99	74	12
Connor Fields	18	32	35	67	97	2
Chris Cloutier	18	25	34	59	65	8
Kyle Buchanan	17	19	38	57	81	0
Chase Fraser	18	32	24	56	62	14
Tehoka Nanticoke	18	32	19	51	53	47
Ian MacKay	17	11	12	23	104	16
Steve Priolo	16	3	15	18	116	20
Kevin Brownell	16	2	13	15	86	6
Totals		247	389	636	1,259	259

=== Goaltenders ===
Player	GP	MIN	W	L	GA	Sv%	GAA
Matt Vinc	18	1,063:55	14	4	179	.807	10.10
Doug Buchan	13	17:58	0	0	6	.625	20.04
Totals		1,081:33	14	4	185	.804	10.26
