= 2022 Philadelphia Wings season =

National Lacrosse League season

2022 Philadelphia Wings
- League: NLL
- Division: East
- 2022 record: 9–9
- Home record: 4–5
- Road record: 5–4
- Goals for: 185
- Goals against: 199
- General Manager: Paul Day
- Coach: Paul Day
- Arena: Wells Fargo Center
- Average attendance: 6,586

The Philadelphia Wings are a lacrosse team based in Philadelphia, Pennsylvania playing in the National Lacrosse League (NLL). The 2021-2022 season is their 3rd season in the NLL.

== Regular season ==
=== Final standings ===
East Conference
P	Team	GP	W	L	PCT	GB	Home	Road	GF	GA	Diff	GF/GP	GA/GP
1	Buffalo Bandits – xyz	18	14	4	.778	0.0	7–2	7–2	247	185	+62	13.72	10.28
2	Toronto Rock – x	18	13	5	.722	1.0	7–2	6–3	207	166	+41	11.50	9.22
3	Halifax Thunderbirds – x	18	11	7	.611	3.0	7–2	4–5	198	195	+3	11.00	10.83
4	Albany FireWolves – x	18	9	9	.500	5.0	5–4	4–5	198	195	+3	11.00	10.83
5	Philadelphia Wings – x	18	9	9	.500	5.0	4–5	5–4	185	199	−14	10.28	11.06
6	Georgia Swarm	18	9	9	.500	5.0	4–5	5–4	205	212	−7	11.39	11.78
7	New York Riptide	18	6	12	.333	8.0	3–6	3–6	214	226	−12	11.89	12.56
8	Rochester Knighthawks	18	4	14	.222	10.0	2–7	2–7	184	221	−37	10.22	12.28

West Conference
P	Team	GP	W	L	PCT	GB	Home	Road	GF	GA	Diff	GF/GP	GA/GP
1	San Diego Seals – xy	18	10	8	.556	0.0	5–4	5–4	202	183	+19	11.22	10.17
2	Calgary Roughnecks – x	18	10	8	.556	0.0	6–3	4–5	194	201	−7	10.78	11.17
3	Colorado Mammoth – x	18	10	8	.556	0.0	7–2	3–6	196	198	−2	10.89	11.00
4	Saskatchewan Rush	18	8	10	.444	2.0	6–3	2–7	196	194	+2	10.89	10.78
5	Panther City Lacrosse Club	18	7	11	.389	3.0	3–6	4–5	190	223	−33	10.56	12.39
6	Vancouver Warriors	18	6	12	.333	4.0	3–6	3–6	199	209	−10	11.06	11.61

== Game log ==
Game	Date	Opponent	Location	Score	OT	Attendance	Record
1	December 4, 2021	Panther City Lacrosse Club	Wells Fargo Center (Philadelphia)	W 12–11	OT	4,116	1–0
2	December 10, 2021	New York Riptide	Wells Fargo Center (Philadelphia)	W 14–12		3,709	2–0
3	December 18, 2021	@ Toronto Rock	FirstOntario Centre	L 9–12		5,024	2–1
4	January 8, 2022	Georgia Swarm	Wells Fargo Center (Philadelphia)	W 12–11	OT	5,549	3–1
5	January 15, 2022	Albany FireWolves	Wells Fargo Center (Philadelphia)	L 8–9		6,368	3–2
6	January 22, 2022	Rochester Knighthawks	Wells Fargo Center (Philadelphia)	W 18–10		6,617	4–2
7	January 23, 2022	New York Riptide	Wells Fargo Center (Philadelphia)	L 12–13		6,206	4–3
8	January 29, 2022	@ Georgia Swarm	Gas South Arena	W 8–7	OT	7,353	5–3
9	February 5, 2022	Toronto Rock	Wells Fargo Center (Philadelphia)	L 7–14		6,776	5–4
10	February 12, 2022	@ Halifax Thunderbirds	Scotiabank Centre	L 8–10		NA	5–5
11	February 26, 2022	Halifax Thunderbirds	Wells Fargo Center (Philadelphia)	L 8–10		9,236	5–6
12	March 12, 2022	@ Buffalo Bandits	KeyBank Center	L 5–17		11,451	5–7
13	March 26, 2022	@ Rochester Knighthawks	Blue Cross Arena	W 12–8		4,571	6–7
14	March 31, 2022	Buffalo Bandits	Wells Fargo Center (Philadelphia)	L 12–17		10,699	6–8
15	April 2, 2022	@ New York Riptide	Nassau Coliseum	W 11–5		4,669	7–8
16	April 8, 2022	@ San Diego Seals	Pechanga Arena	W 13–12		5,688	8–8
17	April 16, 2022	@ Albany FireWolves	Times Union Center	L 5–11		5,745	8–9
18	April 30, 2022	@ Georgia Swarm	Gas South Arena	W 11–10		9,428	9–9

=== Playoffs ===
Game	Date	Opponent	Location	Score	OT	Attendance	Record
Western Conference quarterfinals	May 7, 2022	@ San Diego Seals	Pechanga Arena	L 8–9		6,726	0–1

== Roster ==
Philadelphia Wings roster
Active (21-man) roster		Inactive roster	Coaches
Goaltenders: 31 (Canada) Zach Higgins; 55 (Canada) Angus Goodleaf; Defensemen: 18 (Canada) Steph Charbonneau; 7 (Canada) Alex Crepinsek; 26 (United States) Isaiah Davis-Allen; 29 (Canada) Ian Llord; 41 (Canada) Alex Pace; 44 (United States) John Ranagan; 2 (Canada) Eric Shewell; 3 (Canada) Brock Sorensen; 37 (Canada) Jason Suboch; 94 (Canada) Ryan Wagner	Forwards: 21 (Canada) Kevin Crowley; 22 (Canada) Ben French; 90 (Canada) Ben McIntosh; 1 (United States) Matt Rambo; 10 (United States) Blaze Riorden; 15 (Canada) Corey Small; 23 (Canada) Cory Vitarelli; Transition: 9 (United States) Trevor Baptiste; 46 (Canada) Kiel Matisz (C)	Practice squad: 55 (Canada) Noah Clayton; 20 (Canada) Jonathan Gagliardi; 73 (Canada) Blake Gibson-McDonald; 47 (United States) Kyle Jackson; 22 (Canada) Rowan Kelly; 92 (Canada) Sam LeClair; 13 (United States) Kyle Marr; 96 (United States) Patrick Resch	Head coach: Paul Day; Assistant coaches: Landon Miller; Legend: * Suspended list; (C) Captain; (A) Alternate captain; Roster updated 2019-02-20; NLL Transactions

=== Entry Draft ===
The 2021 NLL Entry Draft took place on August 28, 2022. The Wings made the following selections:

Round	Overall	Player	College/Club
1	15	Hunter Lemieux	Burlington Jr. A/Roberts Wesleyan
3	40	Koby Smith	Towson
4	49	Matt Moore	Virginia
4	55	John Gagliardi	Oakville Jr. A
5	70	Sean Quinn	Drexel
6	84	Jack Farrell	Drexel
