= 2022 Albany FireWolves season =

2022 Albany FireWolves
- League: NLL
- Division: East
- 2022 record: 9-9
- Home record: 5-4
- Road record: 4-5
- Goals for: 198
- Goals against: 195
- General Manager: Chris Seinko
- Coach: Glenn Clark
- Arena: Times Union Center
- Average attendance: 5,524

The Albany FireWolves are a lacrosse team based in Albany, New York playing in the National Lacrosse League (NLL). The 2022 season was the franchise's 6th season in the league, 1st as the Albany FireWolves. The New England Black Wolves moved to Albany to become the Albany FireWolves prior to this season.

== Regular season ==
=== Current standings ===
East Conference
| P | Team | GP | W | L | PCT | GB | Home | Road | GF | GA | Diff | GF/GP | GA/GP |
|---|---|---|---|---|---|---|---|---|---|---|---|---|---|
| 1 | Buffalo Bandits – xyz | 18 | 14 | 4 | .778 | 0.0 | 7–2 | 7–2 | 247 | 185 | +62 | 13.72 | 10.28 |
| 2 | Toronto Rock – x | 18 | 13 | 5 | .722 | 1.0 | 7–2 | 6–3 | 207 | 166 | +41 | 11.50 | 9.22 |
| 3 | Halifax Thunderbirds – x | 18 | 11 | 7 | .611 | 3.0 | 7–2 | 4–5 | 198 | 195 | +3 | 11.00 | 10.83 |
| 4 | Albany FireWolves – x | 18 | 9 | 9 | .500 | 5.0 | 5–4 | 4–5 | 198 | 195 | +3 | 11.00 | 10.83 |
| 5 | Philadelphia Wings – x | 18 | 9 | 9 | .500 | 5.0 | 4–5 | 5–4 | 185 | 199 | −14 | 10.28 | 11.06 |
| 6 | Georgia Swarm | 18 | 9 | 9 | .500 | 5.0 | 4–5 | 5–4 | 205 | 212 | −7 | 11.39 | 11.78 |
| 7 | New York Riptide | 18 | 6 | 12 | .333 | 8.0 | 3–6 | 3–6 | 214 | 226 | −12 | 11.89 | 12.56 |
| 8 | Rochester Knighthawks | 18 | 4 | 14 | .222 | 10.0 | 2–7 | 2–7 | 184 | 221 | −37 | 10.22 | 12.28 |

West Conference
| P | Team | GP | W | L | PCT | GB | Home | Road | GF | GA | Diff | GF/GP | GA/GP |
|---|---|---|---|---|---|---|---|---|---|---|---|---|---|
| 1 | San Diego Seals – xy | 18 | 10 | 8 | .556 | 0.0 | 5–4 | 5–4 | 202 | 183 | +19 | 11.22 | 10.17 |
| 2 | Calgary Roughnecks – x | 18 | 10 | 8 | .556 | 0.0 | 6–3 | 4–5 | 194 | 201 | −7 | 10.78 | 11.17 |
| 3 | Colorado Mammoth – x | 18 | 10 | 8 | .556 | 0.0 | 7–2 | 3–6 | 196 | 198 | −2 | 10.89 | 11.00 |
| 4 | Saskatchewan Rush | 18 | 8 | 10 | .444 | 2.0 | 6–3 | 2–7 | 196 | 194 | +2 | 10.89 | 10.78 |
| 5 | Panther City Lacrosse Club | 18 | 7 | 11 | .389 | 3.0 | 3–6 | 4–5 | 190 | 223 | −33 | 10.56 | 12.39 |
| 6 | Vancouver Warriors | 18 | 6 | 12 | .333 | 4.0 | 3–6 | 3–6 | 199 | 209 | −10 | 11.06 | 11.61 |

== Game log ==
| Game | Date | Opponent | Location | Score | OT | Attendance | Record |
|---|---|---|---|---|---|---|---|
| 1 | December 4, 2021 | @ Toronto Rock | FirstOntario Centre | L 9–10 | | 8,043 | 0–1 |
| 2 | December 18, 2021 | Rochester Knighthawks | Times Union Center | L 7–16 | | 4,885 | 0–2 |
| 3 | January 8, 2022 | Saskatchewan Rush | Times Union Center | W 10–5 | | 4,651 | 1–2 |
| 4 | January 15, 2022 | @ Philadelphia Wings | Wells Fargo Center (Philadelphia) | W 9–8 | | 6,368 | 2–2 |
| 5 | January 29, 2022 | Halifax Thunderbirds | Times Union Center | W 8–6 | | 5,038 | 3–2 |
| 6 | February 4, 2022 | @ Georgia Swarm | Gas South Arena | L 13–14 | | 7,352 | 3–3 |
| 7 | February 5, 2022 | Georgia Swarm | Times Union Center | W 13–11 | | 5,297 | 4–3 |
| 8 | February 12, 2022 | @ Rochester Knighthawks | Blue Cross Arena | L 13–15 | | 3,737 | 4–4 |
| 9 | February 18, 2022 | @ Buffalo Bandits | KeyBank Center | L 8–13 | | 8,241 | 4–5 |
| 10 | February 19, 2022 | Toronto Rock | Times Union Center | L 9–13 | | 5,347 | 4–6 |
| 11 | February 26, 2022 | @ San Diego Seals | Pechanga Arena | W 13–12 | | 5,783 | 5–6 |
| 12 | March 5, 2022 | Buffalo Bandits | Times Union Center | L 11–12 | | 6,011 | 5–7 |
| 13 | March 11, 2022 | @ Halifax Thunderbirds | Scotiabank Centre | W 8–7 | | 5,000 | 6–7 |
| 14 | March 19, 2022 | Georgia Swarm | Times Union Center | L 12–15 | | 6,076 | 6–8 |
| 15 | March 26, 2022 | @ New York Riptide | Nassau Coliseum | L 6–15 | | 4,967 | 6–9 |
| 16 | April 2, 2022 | @ Vancouver Warriors | Rogers Arena | W 11–7 | | 5,864 | 7–9 |
| 17 | April 16, 2022 | Philadelphia Wings | Times Union Center | W 11–5 | | 5,745 | 8–9 |
| 18 | April 30, 2022 | New York Riptide | Times Union Center | W 17–9 | | 6,663 | 9–9 |

=== Playoffs ===
| Game | Date | Opponent | Location | Score | OT | Attendance | Record |
|---|---|---|---|---|---|---|---|
| Eastern Conference quarterfinals | May 7, 2022 | @ Buffalo Bandits | KeyBank Center | L 5–10 | | | 0–1 |

== Roster ==
New England Black Wolves roster
| Active (21-man) roster | | Inactive roster | Coaches |
|---|---|---|---|
| Goaltenders: 30 (Canada) Doug Jamieson; 35 (Canada) Ethan Woods; Defensemen: 10 (Haudenosaunee) Adam Bomberry; 22 (Canada) Nick Chaykowsky; 8 (United States) Greg Downing; 19 (Haudenosaunee) Ty Logan; 13 (United States) Brett Manney (C); 21 (Canada) Mackenzie Mitchell; 91 (United States) Joe Nardella; 26 (Canada) Jackson Nishimura; 62 (Canada) Creighton Reid | Forwards: 98 (Canada) Callum Crawford; 78 (Canada) Jordan Durston; 14 (United States) Dave Emala; 42 (Canada) Andrew Kew; 86 (Canada) Stephan Leblanc (A); 9 (Canada) Reilly O'Connor; 44 (Canada) Tanner Thomson; 15 (United States) Joe Resetarits; Transition: 33 (Canada) John LaFontaine (A); 4 (Canada) Anthony Malcom; 17 (Canada) Colton Watkinson | Practice squad: 27 (Canada) Bailey Brown; 21 (Canada) Mike Byrne; 55 (Canada) Joel Tinney | Head coach: Glenn Clark; Assistant coaches: Darryl Gibson; Clem O'Drasio; Legend: * Suspended list; (C) Captain; (A) Alternate captain; Roster updated 2019-09-18; NLL Transactions |

=== Entry Draft ===
The 2021 NLL Entry Draft took place on August 28, 2021. The FireWolves made the following selections:

| Round | Overall | Player | College/Club |
|---|---|---|---|
| 1 | 16 | Patrick Kaschalk | Burlington Jr. A/Stony Brook |
| 4 | 61 | Jake Harrington | Vermont |
| 5 | 76 | Jake Foster | Calgary Mountaineers Jr. A/Maryville |
| 6 | 90 | Brett Erskine | St. Catharines Jr. A/Detroit Mercy |
