= 2022 Halifax Thunderbirds season =

2022 Halifax Thunderbirds
- League: NLL
- Division: 3rd East
- 2022 record: 11-7
- Home record: 7-2
- Road record: 4-5
- Goals for: 198
- Goals against: 195
- General Manager: Curt Styres
- Coach: Mike Accursi
- Arena: Scotiabank Centre

The Halifax Thunderbirds are a lacrosse team based in Halifax, Nova Scotia, that plays in the National Lacrosse League (NLL). the 2022 NLL season is their 2nd season the NLL. They were formerly the Rochester Knighthawks but moved to Halifax, as Rochester gained an expansion franchise.

== Regular season ==
=== Final standings ===
East Conference
P	Team	GP	W	L	PCT	GB	Home	Road	GF	GA	Diff	GF/GP	GA/GP
1	Buffalo Bandits – xyz	18	14	4	.778	0.0	7–2	7–2	247	185	+62	13.72	10.28
2	Toronto Rock – x	18	13	5	.722	1.0	7–2	6–3	207	166	+41	11.50	9.22
3	Halifax Thunderbirds – x	18	11	7	.611	3.0	7–2	4–5	198	195	+3	11.00	10.83
4	Albany FireWolves – x	18	9	9	.500	5.0	5–4	4–5	198	195	+3	11.00	10.83
5	Philadelphia Wings – x	18	9	9	.500	5.0	4–5	5–4	185	199	−14	10.28	11.06
6	Georgia Swarm	18	9	9	.500	5.0	4–5	5–4	205	212	−7	11.39	11.78
7	New York Riptide	18	6	12	.333	8.0	3–6	3–6	214	226	−12	11.89	12.56
8	Rochester Knighthawks	18	4	14	.222	10.0	2–7	2–7	184	221	−37	10.22	12.28

West Conference
P	Team	GP	W	L	PCT	GB	Home	Road	GF	GA	Diff	GF/GP	GA/GP
1	San Diego Seals – xy	18	10	8	.556	0.0	5–4	5–4	202	183	+19	11.22	10.17
2	Calgary Roughnecks – x	18	10	8	.556	0.0	6–3	4–5	194	201	−7	10.78	11.17
3	Colorado Mammoth – x	18	10	8	.556	0.0	7–2	3–6	196	198	−2	10.89	11.00
4	Saskatchewan Rush	18	8	10	.444	2.0	6–3	2–7	196	194	+2	10.89	10.78
5	Panther City Lacrosse Club	18	7	11	.389	3.0	3–6	4–5	190	223	−33	10.56	12.39
6	Vancouver Warriors	18	6	12	.333	4.0	3–6	3–6	199	209	−10	11.06	11.61

== Game log ==
Game	Date	Opponent	Location	Score	OT	Attendance	Record
1	December 4, 2021	Saskatchewan Rush	Scotiabank Centre	W 12–11	OT	7,488	1–0
2	December 10, 2021	Toronto Rock	Scotiabank Centre	W 11–7		6,424	2–0
3	January 15, 2022	@ Toronto Rock	FirstOntario Centre	W 14–13	OT		3–0
4	January 29, 2022	@ Albany FireWolves	Times Union Center	L 6–8		5,038	3–1
5	February 4, 2022	New York Riptide	Scotiabank Centre	W 13–10			4–1
6	February 13, 2022	Philadelphia Wings	Scotiabank Centre	W 10–8			5–1
7	February 19, 2022	Georgia Swarm	Scotiabank Centre	W 15–10		3,000	6–1
8	February 26, 2022	@ Philadelphia Wings	Wells Fargo Center (Philadelphia)	W 10–8		9,236	7–1
9	March 5, 2022	Vancouver Warriors	Scotiabank Centre	W 14–12		3,000	8–1
10	March 11, 2022	Albany FireWolves	Scotiabank Centre	L 7–8		5,000	8–2
11	March 12, 2022	@ Georgia Swarm	Gas South Arena	L 9–10		8,546	8–3
12	March 26, 2022	@ Buffalo Bandits	KeyBank Center	L 11–16		11,169	8–4
13	March 27, 2022	Buffalo Bandits	Scotiabank Centre	L 11–16		5,715	8–5
14	April 1, 2022	Rochester Knighthawks	Scotiabank Centre	W 11–7		7,443	9–5
15	April 8, 2022	@ Calgary Roughnecks	Scotiabank Saddledome	L 8–13		8,321	9–6
16	April 16, 2022	@ Toronto Rock	FirstOntario Center	L 7–15		10,047	9–7
17	April 23, 2022	@ New York Riptide	Nassau Coliseum	W 16–13		4,968	10–7
18	April 30, 2022	@ Rochester Knighthawks	Blue Cross Arena	W 13–10		5,156	11–7

=== Playoffs ===
Game	Date	Opponent	Location	Score	OT	Attendance	Record
Eastern Conference Quarterfinals	May 6, 2022	Toronto Rock	Scotiabank Centre	L 13–14	OT	7,241	0–1

== Roster ==
Goaltenders

- 35 (Czech Republic) Peter Dubenski
- 76 (Haudenosaunee) Warren Hill

Defenseman

- 4 (Canada) Graeme Hossack
- 18 (Canada) Jake Withers
- 19 (Haudenosaunee) Nonkon Thompson
- 25 (Canada) James Barclay
- 34 (United States) Cory Becker
- 37 (Canada) Scott Campbell
- 45 (Canada) Luc Magnan
- 68 (Canada) Trevor Smyth

Forwards

- 7 (Canada) Eric Fannell
- 16 (Canada) Mike Burke
- 17 (Canada) Ryan Benesch
- 21 (Canada) Chris Boushy
- 24 (Canada) Clarke Petterson
- 28 (Republic of Ireland) Stephen Keogh
- 33 (Canada) Austin Shanks
- 47 (Haudenosaunee) Kyle Jackson
- 88 (Haudenosaunee) Cody Jamieson

Transition

- 6 (Canada) Brad Gillies
- 44 (Canada) Colton Armstrong

Practice

- 00 (Haudenosaunee) Johnny Jimerson
- 12 (Canada) Chet Koneczny
- 13 (Canada) Brandon Robinson
- 81 (Haudenosaunee) Clay Scanlan

Injured

- 20 (Canada) Luke Van Schepen

Head Coach

- Mike Accursi

Assistant Coaches

- Chad Culp
- Jason Johnson
- Roger Chrysler
- Billy Dee Smith

Athletic Performance Coach

- Dan Noble

Equipment Manager

- Dave Sowden

=== Entry Draft ===
The 2021 NLL Entry Draft took place on August 28, 2021. The Thunderbirds made the following selections:

Round	Overall	Player	College/Club
1	12	Max Wilson	Victoria Shamrocks Jr. A/NJIT
2	18	Drew Hutchison	Burlington Jr. A/RIT
2	28	Jackson Reid	Six Nations Jr. A/Ohio State
3	39	Kealan Pilon	St. Catharines Jr. A/Queen’s University of Charlotte
4	59	Chris Fake	Yale
5	74	Jeremy Winston	Jacksonville
6	88	Colin Hinton	Jacksonville
