= 2022 Colorado Mammoth season =

National Lacrosse League season

2022 Colorado Mammoth
- NLL Champions
- League: NLL
- Division: 3rd West
- 2022 record: 10-8
- Home record: 7-2
- Road record: 3-6
- Goals for: 196
- Goals against: 198
- General Manager: Brad Self
- Coach: Pat Coyle
- Captain: Dan Coates
- Alternate captains: Joey Cupido; Robert Hope
- Arena: Ball Arena

The Colorado Mammoth are a lacrosse team based in Denver, Colorado playing in the National Lacrosse League (NLL). The 2022 season is the 35th in franchise history and 19th as the Mammoth (previously the Washington Power, Pittsburgh Crossefire, and Baltimore Thunder).

== Final standings ==
East Conference
P	Team	GP	W	L	PCT	GB	Home	Road	GF	GA	Diff	GF/GP	GA/GP
1	Buffalo Bandits – xyz	18	14	4	.778	0.0	7–2	7–2	247	185	+62	13.72	10.28
2	Toronto Rock – x	18	13	5	.722	1.0	7–2	6–3	207	166	+41	11.50	9.22
3	Halifax Thunderbirds – x	18	11	7	.611	3.0	7–2	4–5	198	195	+3	11.00	10.83
4	Albany FireWolves – x	18	9	9	.500	5.0	5–4	4–5	198	195	+3	11.00	10.83
5	Philadelphia Wings – x	18	9	9	.500	5.0	4–5	5–4	185	199	−14	10.28	11.06
6	Georgia Swarm	18	9	9	.500	5.0	4–5	5–4	205	212	−7	11.39	11.78
7	New York Riptide	18	6	12	.333	8.0	3–6	3–6	214	226	−12	11.89	12.56
8	Rochester Knighthawks	18	4	14	.222	10.0	2–7	2–7	184	221	−37	10.22	12.28

West Conference
P	Team	GP	W	L	PCT	GB	Home	Road	GF	GA	Diff	GF/GP	GA/GP
1	San Diego Seals – xy	18	10	8	.556	0.0	5–4	5–4	202	183	+19	11.22	10.17
2	Calgary Roughnecks – x	18	10	8	.556	0.0	6–3	4–5	194	201	−7	10.78	11.17
3	Colorado Mammoth – x	18	10	8	.556	0.0	7–2	3–6	196	198	−2	10.89	11.00
4	Saskatchewan Rush	18	8	10	.444	2.0	6–3	2–7	196	194	+2	10.89	10.78
5	Panther City Lacrosse Club	18	7	11	.389	3.0	3–6	4–5	190	223	−33	10.56	12.39
6	Vancouver Warriors	18	6	12	.333	4.0	3–6	3–6	199	209	−10	11.06	11.61

=== Regular season ===
Game	Date	Opponent	Location	Score	OT	Attendance	Record
1	December 4, 2021	@ Georgia Swarm	Gas South Arena	W 16–11		5,127	1–0
2	December 11, 2021	San Diego Seals	Ball Arena	L 4–13		8,730	1–1
3	December 17, 2021	@ Panther City Lacrosse Club	Dickies Arena	W 8–7		3,587	2–1
4	January 7, 2022	@ Vancouver Warriors	Rogers Arena	W 18–15		4,830	3–1
5	January 29, 2022	Vancouver Warriors	Ball Arena	W 9–4		8,102	4–1
6	February 5, 2022	Calgary Roughnecks	Ball Arena	W 14–10		7,826	5–1
7	February 11, 2022	@ Calgary Roughnecks	Scotiabank Saddledome	L 7–9		6,591	5–2
8	February 20, 2022	Saskatchewan Rush	Ball Arena	W 12–10		4,830	6–2
9	February 26, 2022	@ Saskatchewan Rush	SaskTel Centre	L 9–10			6–3
10	March 11, 2022	Panther City Lacrosse Club	Ball Arena	L 14–20			6–4
11	March 18, 2022	Vancouver Warriors	Ball Arena	W 17–16			7–4
12	March 19, 2022	@ San Diego Seals	Pechanga Arena	L 7–9			7–5
13	March 26, 2022	@ Panther City Lacrosse Club	Dickies Arena	L 6–10			7–6
14	April 2, 2022	Buffalo Bandits	Ball Arena	W 15–14		9,601	8–6
15	April 4, 2022	New York Riptide	Ball Arena	W 10–7			9–6
16	April 9, 2022	San Diego Seals	Ball Arena	W 11–10		9,560	10–6
17	April 16, 2022	@ Saskatchewan Rush	SaskTel Centre	L 8–9			10–7
18	April 30, 2022	@ Calgary Roughnecks	Scotiabank Saddledome	L 11–14			10–8

=== Playoffs ===
Game	Date	Opponent	Location	Score	OT	Attendance	Record
Western Conference semi-final	May 6, 2022	@ Calgary Roughnecks	Scotiabank Saddledome	W 16–12			1–0
Western Conference final (game 1)	May 13, 2022	@ San Diego Seals	Pechanga Arena	W 14–12			2–0
Western Conference final (game 2)	May 21, 2022	San Diego Seals	Ball Arena	L 10–11	OT		2–1
Western Conference final (game 3)	May 28, 2022	@ San Diego Seals	Pechanga Arena	W 15–13			3–1
finals (game 1)	June 4, 2022	@ Buffalo Bandits	KeyBank Center	L 14–15			3–2
finals (game 2)	June 11, 2022	Buffalo Bandits	Ball Arena	W 11–8			4–2
finals (game 3)	June 18, 2022	@ Buffalo Bandits	KeyBank Center	W 10–8			5–2

== Roster ==
Colorado Mammoth roster
Active (21-man) roster		Inactive roster	Coaches
Goaltenders: 30 (Canada) Tyler Carlson; 45 (Canada) Dillon Ward; Defensemen: 13 (Canada) Brett Craig; 37 (Canada) Dan Coates (C); 82 (Canada) Joey Cupido (A); 27 (Canada) Scott Carnegie; 3 (United States) Tim Edwards; 14 (Canada) Warren Jeffrey; 23 (Canada) Jordan Gilles; 18 (Canada) Robert Hope (A); 86 (Canada) John Lintz; 4 (Canada) Josh Sullivan	Forwards: 67 (Canada) Kyle Killen; 55 (Canada) Dylan Kinnear; 16 (Canada) Ryan Lee; 51 (Canada) Eli McLaughlin; 2 (Canada) Will Malcom; 20 (Canada) Jacob Ruest; 17 (Canada) Chris Wardle; 7 (Canada) Tyler Digby	Practice squad: 41 (Canada) Erik Turner; 15 (Canada) Ilija Gajic; 91 (Canada) Jake McNabb; 71 (Canada) Jeff Wittig; Holdout: 84 (United States) Dylan Molloy	Head coach: Pat Coyle; Assistant coaches: Andrew McBride; Shawn Williams; Legend: * Suspended list; (C) Captain; (A) Alternate captain; Roster updated 2018-01-02; NLL Transactions

=== Entry Draft ===
The 2021 NLL Entry Draft took place on August 28, 2021. The Mammoth made the following selections:

Round	Overall	Player	College/Club
3	44	Logan Wisnauskas	Maryland
4	54	Keegan Khan	Villanova
5	69	Jake Higgins	Maryland
6	83	Noah Lebar	KW Jr. A

== See also ==
- 2022 NLL season
