= 2022 Panther City Lacrosse Club season =

2022 Panther City Lacrosse Club
- League: NLL
- Division: TBD West
- 2022 record: 7–11
- Home record: 3–6
- Road record: 4–5
- Goals for: 190
- Goals against: 223
- General Manager: Bob Hamley
- Coach: Tracey Kelusky
- Captain: TBD
- Alternate captains: TBD
- Arena: Dickies Arena
- Average attendance: 4,995

The Panther City Lacrosse Club is a professional lacrosse team based in Fort Worth, Texas. The team plays in the National Lacrosse League (NLL). The 2022 season is the Inaugural season in franchise history.

== Regular season ==
=== Final standings ===
East Conference
P	Team	GP	W	L	PCT	GB	Home	Road	GF	GA	Diff	GF/GP	GA/GP
1	Buffalo Bandits – xyz	18	14	4	.778	0.0	7–2	7–2	247	185	+62	13.72	10.28
2	Toronto Rock – x	18	13	5	.722	1.0	7–2	6–3	207	166	+41	11.50	9.22
3	Halifax Thunderbirds – x	18	11	7	.611	3.0	7–2	4–5	198	195	+3	11.00	10.83
4	Albany FireWolves – x	18	9	9	.500	5.0	5–4	4–5	198	195	+3	11.00	10.83
5	Philadelphia Wings – x	18	9	9	.500	5.0	4–5	5–4	185	199	−14	10.28	11.06
6	Georgia Swarm	18	9	9	.500	5.0	4–5	5–4	205	212	−7	11.39	11.78
7	New York Riptide	18	6	12	.333	8.0	3–6	3–6	214	226	−12	11.89	12.56
8	Rochester Knighthawks	18	4	14	.222	10.0	2–7	2–7	184	221	−37	10.22	12.28

West Conference
P	Team	GP	W	L	PCT	GB	Home	Road	GF	GA	Diff	GF/GP	GA/GP
1	San Diego Seals – xy	18	10	8	.556	0.0	5–4	5–4	202	183	+19	11.22	10.17
2	Calgary Roughnecks – x	18	10	8	.556	0.0	6–3	4–5	194	201	−7	10.78	11.17
3	Colorado Mammoth – x	18	10	8	.556	0.0	7–2	3–6	196	198	−2	10.89	11.00
4	Saskatchewan Rush	18	8	10	.444	2.0	6–3	2–7	196	194	+2	10.89	10.78
5	Panther City Lacrosse Club	18	7	11	.389	3.0	3–6	4–5	190	223	−33	10.56	12.39
6	Vancouver Warriors	18	6	12	.333	4.0	3–6	3–6	199	209	−10	11.06	11.61

=== Game log ===
Game	Date	Opponent	Location	Score	OT	Attendance	Record
1	December 4, 2021	@ Philadelphia Wings	Wells Fargo Center (Philadelphia)	L 11–12	OT	4,116	0–1
2	December 10, 2021	Vancouver Warriors	Dickies Arena	L 8–14		7,309	0–2
3	December 17, 2021	Colorado Mammoth	Dickies Arena	L 7–8		3,587	0–3
4	January 8, 2022	@ San Diego Seals	Pechanga Arena	L 12–15		5,187	0–4
5	January 15, 2022	@ New York Riptide	Nassau Coliseum	W 13–12	OT	3,401	1–4
6	January 29, 2022	@ Saskatchewan Rush	SaskTel Centre	L 7–16		8,606	1–5
7	February 5, 2022	@ Vancouver Warriors	Rogers Arena	L 11–17		7,483	1–6
8	February 12, 2022	San Diego Seals	Dickies Arena	L 4–10		6,465	1–7
9	February 20, 2022	Calgary Roughnecks	Dickies Arena	L 12–13		5,403	1–8
10	February 26, 2022	Vancouver Warriors	Dickies Arena	W 11–10		4,714	2–8
11	March 5, 2022	Saskatchewan Rush	Dickies Arena	W 17–16	OT	4,741	3–8
12	March 11, 2022	@ Colorado Mammoth	Ball Arena	W 20–14		7,959	4–8
13	March 19, 2022	@ Calgary Roughnecks	Scotiabank Saddledome	W 14–11		9,312	5–8
14	March 26, 2022	Colorado Mammoth	Dickies Arena	W 10–6		4,630	6–8
15	April 9, 2022	@ Calgary Roughnecks	Scotiabank Saddledome	L 4–14		8,178	6–9
16	April 15, 2022	@ San Diego Seals	Pechanga Arena	W 11–10		6,200	7–9
17	April 23, 2022	Georgia Swarm	Dickies Arena	L 9–12		3,959	7–10
18	April 30, 2022	Saskatchewan Rush	Dickies Arena	L 9–13		4,143	7–11

=== Entry Draft ===
The 2021 NLL Entry Draft took place on August 28, 2021. The Panther City made the following selections:

Round	Overall	Player	College/Club
1	1	Jonathan Donville	Brooklin MSL/Cornell
1	11	Nathan Grenon	Brampton Jr. A/Mercyhurst
2	17	Caleb Kueber	Victoria Shamrocks Jr. A/Mercyhurst
2	31	Jack Hannah	Rivermen OCBLL/Denver
3	33	Taite Cattoni	Peterborough Jr. A/Johns Hopkins
4	48	Cam Badour	Cobourg MSL/Duke
5	63	Owen Seebold	Syracuse
6	77	Ronan Jacoby	Wesleyan University
