= 2022 Toronto Rock season =

2022 Toronto Rock
- League: NLL
- Division: 2nd East
- 2022 record: 13-5
- Home record: 7-2
- Road record: 6-3
- Goals for: 207
- Goals against: 166
- General Manager: Jamie Dawick
- Coach: Matt Sawyer
- Captain: Challen Rogers
- Alternate captains: Rob Hellyer; Bill Hostrawser; Brad Kri; Tom Schreiber
- Arena: FirstOntario Centre
- Average attendance: 8,071

The Toronto Rock are a lacrosse team based in Hamilton, Ontario playing in the National Lacrosse League (NLL). The 2022 season is the 24th in franchise history, and 23rd as the Rock. This was the second team season in Hamilton and the first since 1998 following a move from Toronto.

== Regular season ==
=== Final standings ===
East Conference
P	Team	GP	W	L	PCT	GB	Home	Road	GF	GA	Diff	GF/GP	GA/GP
1	Buffalo Bandits – xyz	18	14	4	.778	0.0	7–2	7–2	247	185	+62	13.72	10.28
2	Toronto Rock – x	18	13	5	.722	1.0	7–2	6–3	207	166	+41	11.50	9.22
3	Halifax Thunderbirds – x	18	11	7	.611	3.0	7–2	4–5	198	195	+3	11.00	10.83
4	Albany FireWolves – x	18	9	9	.500	5.0	5–4	4–5	198	195	+3	11.00	10.83
5	Philadelphia Wings – x	18	9	9	.500	5.0	4–5	5–4	185	199	−14	10.28	11.06
6	Georgia Swarm	18	9	9	.500	5.0	4–5	5–4	205	212	−7	11.39	11.78
7	New York Riptide	18	6	12	.333	8.0	3–6	3–6	214	226	−12	11.89	12.56
8	Rochester Knighthawks	18	4	14	.222	10.0	2–7	2–7	184	221	−37	10.22	12.28

West Conference
P	Team	GP	W	L	PCT	GB	Home	Road	GF	GA	Diff	GF/GP	GA/GP
1	San Diego Seals – xy	18	10	8	.556	0.0	5–4	5–4	202	183	+19	11.22	10.17
2	Calgary Roughnecks – x	18	10	8	.556	0.0	6–3	4–5	194	201	−7	10.78	11.17
3	Colorado Mammoth – x	18	10	8	.556	0.0	7–2	3–6	196	198	−2	10.89	11.00
4	Saskatchewan Rush	18	8	10	.444	2.0	6–3	2–7	196	194	+2	10.89	10.78
5	Panther City Lacrosse Club	18	7	11	.389	3.0	3–6	4–5	190	223	−33	10.56	12.39
6	Vancouver Warriors	18	6	12	.333	4.0	3–6	3–6	199	209	−10	11.06	11.61

== Game log ==
=== Regular season ===
Game	Date	Opponent	Location	Score	OT	Attendance	Record
1	December 4, 2021	Albany FireWolves	FirstOntario Centre	W 10–9		8,043	1–0
2	December 10, 2021	@ Halifax Thunderbirds	Scotiabank Centre	L 7–11		6,424	1–1
3	December 18, 2021	Philadelphia Wings	FirstOntario Centre	W 12–9		5,024	2–1
4	January 8, 2022	@ Buffalo Bandits	KeyBank Center	L 6–12		8,005	2–2
5	January 15, 2022	Halifax Thunderbirds	FirstOntario Centre	L 13–14	OT	0	2–3
6	January 29, 2022	Rochester Knighthawks	FirstOntario Centre	W 12–8		0	3–3
7	February 5, 2022	@ Philadelphia Wings	Wells Fargo Center	W 14–7		6,776	4–3
8	February 12, 2022	Buffalo Bandits	FirstOntario Centre	W 12–10		0	5–3
9	February 19, 2022	@ Albany FireWolves	MVP Arena	W 13–9		5,347	6–3
10	February 26, 2022	@ New York Riptide	Nassau Coliseum	L 13–14		3,956	6–4
11	March 5, 2022	New York Riptide	FirstOntario Centre	W 12–9		7,920	7–4
12	March 12, 2022	@ Vancouver Warriors	Rogers Arena	W 14–5		8,283	8–4
13	March 26, 2022	Georgia Swarm	FirstOntario Centre	L 6–10		8,841	8–5
14	April 1, 2022	@ Georgia Swarm	Gas South Arena	W 13–9		9,399	9–5
15	April 2, 2022	San Diego Seals	FirstOntario Centre	W 14–7		8,549	10–5
16	April 9, 2022	@ Rochester Knighthawks	Blue Cross Arena	W 11–9		4,117	11–5
17	April 16, 2022	Halifax Thunderbirds	FirstOntario Centre	W 15–7		10,047	12–5
18	April 30, 2022	@ Buffalo Bandits	KeyBank Center	W 10–7		13,481	13–5

=== Playoffs ===
Game	Date	Opponent	Location	Score	OT	Attendance	Record
Eastern Conference Quarterfinals	May 6, 2022	Halifax Thunderbirds	FirstOntario Centre	W 14–13	OT	7,241	1–0
Eastern Conference Finals (Game 1)	May 15, 2022	@ Buffalo Bandits	KeyBank Center	L 17–18		10,258	1–1
Eastern Conference Finals (Game 2)	May 21, 2022	Buffalo Bandits	FirstOntario Centre	L 9–10		7,992	1–2

== Roster ==
Toronto Rock roster
Active (21-man) roster		Inactive roster	Coaches
Goaltenders: 1 (Canada) Riley Hutchcraft; 66 (Canada) Nick Rose; Defencemen: 71 (Canada) Sheldon Burns; 21 (Canada) Mitch de Snoo; 42 (Canada) Jamison Dilks; 45 (Canada) Damon Edwards; 93 (Canada) Latrell Harris; 91 (Canada) Billy Hostrawser (A); 3 (United States) T. D. Ierlan; 33 (Canada) Josh Jubenville; 20 (Canada) Bradley Kri (A); 14 (Canada) Phil Mazzuca; 22 (Canada) Jason Noble; 61 (Canada) Brandon Slade (D)	Forwards: 25 (Canada) Dan Craig; 10 (South Africa) Chris Boushy; 6 (Canada) Dan Dawson; 10 (Canada) Rob Hellyer (A); 2 (Canada) Zach Manns; 97 (Canada) Reid Reinholdt; 19 (Canada) Justin Scott; 26 (United States) Tom Schreiber (A); Transition: 23 (Canada) Challen Rogers (C)	Practice squad: 17 (Canada) Aaron Forster (F); 92 (Canada) Troy Holowchuk (G); Injured reserve: 47 (Canada) Adam Jay (D); 55 (Canada) Chris Weier (D); Holdout: 51 (Canada) Jordan McKenna (D)	Head coach: Matt Sawyer; Assistant coaches: Bruce Codd; Blaine Manning; Brandon Miller; Legend: * Suspended list; (C) Captain; (A) Alternate captain; Roster updated 2022-3-1; NLL Transactions

=== Entry Draft ===
The 2021 NLL Entry Draft took place on August 28, 2021. The Toronto Rock made the following selections:

Round	Overall	Player	College/Club
4	58	Devon Dunkerley	Orangeville Jr. A
5	73	Curtis Hall	KW Jr. A/Paris ALL
6	87	Jordan McKenna	Orangeville Jr. A
