= 2022 Vancouver Warriors season =

2022 Vancouver Warriors
- League: NLL
- Division: 6th West
- 2022 record: 6–12
- Home record: 3–6
- Road record: 3–6
- Goals for: 199
- Goals against: 209
- General Manager: Dan Richardson
- Coach: Chris Gill
- Captain: Brett Mydske
- Alternate captains: Mitch Jones; Tyler Codron
- Arena: Rogers Arena
- Average attendance: 6,920

Team leaders
- Goals: Keegan Bal (44)
- Assists: Keegan Bal (55)
- Points: Keegan Bal (99)
- Penalties in minutes: Owen Barker (47)
- Wins: Alex Buque (5)
- Goals against average: Steve Fryer (10.38)

The Vancouver Warriors is a professional lacrosse team based in Vancouver, British Columbia. The team plays in the National Lacrosse League (NLL). The 2022 season was the 22nd in franchise history and the 8th season in Vancouver. The franchise previously played in Everett, Washington, San Jose, and Albany, New York.

After going 6-12 for the season, and winning only one of their last 10 games, the Warriors decided to part ways with head coach Chris Gill and offensive coordinator Kaleb Toth at the end of the season.

Brett Mydske took over the role of captain this season from Matt Beers, and Mitch Jones and Tyler Codron were named Assistant Captains.

== Regular season ==
=== Final standings ===
East Conference
| P | Team | GP | W | L | PCT | GB | Home | Road | GF | GA | Diff | GF/GP | GA/GP |
|---|---|---|---|---|---|---|---|---|---|---|---|---|---|
| 1 | Buffalo Bandits – xyz | 18 | 14 | 4 | .778 | 0.0 | 7–2 | 7–2 | 247 | 185 | +62 | 13.72 | 10.28 |
| 2 | Toronto Rock – x | 18 | 13 | 5 | .722 | 1.0 | 7–2 | 6–3 | 207 | 166 | +41 | 11.50 | 9.22 |
| 3 | Halifax Thunderbirds – x | 18 | 11 | 7 | .611 | 3.0 | 7–2 | 4–5 | 198 | 195 | +3 | 11.00 | 10.83 |
| 4 | Albany FireWolves – x | 18 | 9 | 9 | .500 | 5.0 | 5–4 | 4–5 | 198 | 195 | +3 | 11.00 | 10.83 |
| 5 | Philadelphia Wings – x | 18 | 9 | 9 | .500 | 5.0 | 4–5 | 5–4 | 185 | 199 | −14 | 10.28 | 11.06 |
| 6 | Georgia Swarm | 18 | 9 | 9 | .500 | 5.0 | 4–5 | 5–4 | 205 | 212 | −7 | 11.39 | 11.78 |
| 7 | New York Riptide | 18 | 6 | 12 | .333 | 8.0 | 3–6 | 3–6 | 214 | 226 | −12 | 11.89 | 12.56 |
| 8 | Rochester Knighthawks | 18 | 4 | 14 | .222 | 10.0 | 2–7 | 2–7 | 184 | 221 | −37 | 10.22 | 12.28 |

West Conference
| P | Team | GP | W | L | PCT | GB | Home | Road | GF | GA | Diff | GF/GP | GA/GP |
|---|---|---|---|---|---|---|---|---|---|---|---|---|---|
| 1 | San Diego Seals – xy | 18 | 10 | 8 | .556 | 0.0 | 5–4 | 5–4 | 202 | 183 | +19 | 11.22 | 10.17 |
| 2 | Calgary Roughnecks – x | 18 | 10 | 8 | .556 | 0.0 | 6–3 | 4–5 | 194 | 201 | −7 | 10.78 | 11.17 |
| 3 | Colorado Mammoth – x | 18 | 10 | 8 | .556 | 0.0 | 7–2 | 3–6 | 196 | 198 | −2 | 10.89 | 11.00 |
| 4 | Saskatchewan Rush | 18 | 8 | 10 | .444 | 2.0 | 6–3 | 2–7 | 196 | 194 | +2 | 10.89 | 10.78 |
| 5 | Panther City Lacrosse Club | 18 | 7 | 11 | .389 | 3.0 | 3–6 | 4–5 | 190 | 223 | −33 | 10.56 | 12.39 |
| 6 | Vancouver Warriors | 18 | 6 | 12 | .333 | 4.0 | 3–6 | 3–6 | 199 | 209 | −10 | 11.06 | 11.61 |

=== Game log ===
| Game | Date | Opponent | Location | Score | OT | Attendance | Record |
|---|---|---|---|---|---|---|---|
| 1 | December 3, 2021 | @ San Diego Seals | Pechanga Arena | W 8–7 | | 5,633 | 1–0 |
| 2 | December 10, 2021 | @ Panther City Lacrosse Club | Dickies Arena | W 14–8 | | 7,309 | 2–0 |
| 3 | December 17, 2021 | Saskatchewan Rush | Rogers Arena | L 9–10 | | 6,086 | 2–1 |
| 4 | January 7, 2022 | Colorado Mammoth | Rogers Arena | L 15–18 | | 4,830 | 2–2 |
| 5 | January 29, 2022 | @ Colorado Mammoth | Ball Arena | L 4–9 | | 8,102 | 2–3 |
| 6 | February 5, 2022 | Panther City Lacrosse Club | Rogers Arena | W 17–11 | | 7,483 | 3–3 |
| 7 | February 12, 2022 | Saskatchewan Rush | Rogers Arena | W 13–7 | | 5,830 | 4–3 |
| 8 | February 18, 2022 | @ Calgary Roughnecks | Scotiabank Saddledome | W 11–10 | | 9,337 | 5–3 |
| 9 | February 26, 2022 | @ Panther City Lacrosse Club | Dickies Arena | L 10–11 | | 4,714 | 5–4 |
| 10 | March 5, 2022 | @ Halifax Thunderbirds | Scotiabank Centre | L 12–14 | | 3,000 | 5–5 |
| 11 | March 12, 2022 | Toronto Rock | Rogers Arena | L 5–14 | | 8,283 | 5–6 |
| 12 | March 18, 2022 | @ Colorado Mammoth | Ball Arena | L 16–17 | OT | 7,699 | 5–7 |
| 13 | March 25, 2022 | San Diego Seals | Rogers Arena | W 14–12 | | 7,683 | 6–7 |
| 14 | April 1, 2022 | @ Calgary Roughnecks | Scotiabank Saddledome | L 9–10 | OT | 7,958 | 6–8 |
| 15 | April 2, 2022 | Albany FireWolves | Rogers Arena | L 7–11 | | 5,864 | 6–9 |
| 16 | April 9, 2022 | @ Saskatchewan Rush | SaskTel Centre | L 13–15 | | 9,324 | 6–10 |
| 17 | April 16, 2022 | Calgary Roughnecks | Rogers Arena | L 13–15 | | 7,138 | 6–11 |
| 18 | April 30, 2022 | San Diego Seals | Rogers Arena | L 9–10 | | 9,083 | 6–12 |

== Roster ==
Vancouver Warriors roster
| Active (21-man) roster | | Inactive roster | Coaches |
|---|---|---|---|
| Goaltenders: (Canada) Aiden Walsh; (Canada) Steve Fryer; (Canada) Brody Harris; Defensemen: 27 (Canada) Owen Barker; (Canada) Reid Bowering; 7 (Canada) Tyler Codron (A); (Canada) Tyrell Hamer-Jackson; (Canada) Anthony Kalinich; (Canada) Garrett McIntosh; 2 (Canada) Brett Mydske (C); 29 (Canada) Colton Porter; (Canada) Tyson Roe; (Canada) Taylor Stuart | Forwards: 45 (Canada) Keegan Bal; (Canada) Adam Charalambides; (Canada) Matthew Dinsdale; (Canada) Michell Gustavsen; 16 (Canada) Mitch Jones (A); (Canada) Kyle Killen; (Canada) Riley Loewen; (Canada) Ryan Martel; 11 (Scotland) Jordan McBride; 18 (Canada) Logan Schuss; Transition: (Canada) Keegan Bell; 14 (Canada) Brandon Goodwin; (Canada) Derek Lloyd; (Canada) Justin Salt; (Canada) Thomas Semple | | Head Coach: Chris Gill; Assistant Coaches: Kaleb Toth (offensive coordinator); Curtis Hodgson (defensive coordinator); Legend: * Suspended list; (C) Captain; (A) Alternate captain; Roster updated 2022-10-30; NLL Transactions |

=== Entry Draft ===
The 2021 NLL Entry Draft took place on August 28, 2021. The Warriors made the following selections:

| Round | Overall | Player | College/Club |
|---|---|---|---|
| 1 | 4 | Adam Charalambides | Orangeville Jr. A/Rutgers |
| 3 | 36 | Bryce Schmermund | St. Albert Jr. A |
| 3 | 46 | Graden Soucy | Nanaimo WLA/Rockhurst |
| 4 | 51 | Owen Prybylski | Villanova |
| 5 | 66 | William Clayton | Coquitlam Jr. A/Newberry |
| 6 | 80 | Aiden Danby | Delta Jr. A/SFU |

== See also ==
- 2022 NLL season
