= 2022 Rochester Knighthawks season =

2022 Rochester Knighthawks
- League: NLL
- Division: North
- 2022 record: 4-14
- Home record: 2-7
- Road record: 2-7
- Goals for: 184
- Goals against: 221
- General Manager: Dan Carey
- Coach: Mike Hasen
- Arena: Blue Cross Arena

The Rochester Knighthawks are a lacrosse team based in Rochester, New York playing in the National Lacrosse League (NLL). The 2022 season will be the team's 2nd season in the league. The original Knighthawks moved to Halifax to become the Halifax Thunderbirds.

== Regular season ==
=== Current standings ===
East Conference
P	Team	GP	W	L	PCT	GB	Home	Road	GF	GA	Diff	GF/GP	GA/GP
1	Buffalo Bandits – xyz	18	14	4	.778	0.0	7–2	7–2	247	185	+62	13.72	10.28
2	Toronto Rock – x	18	13	5	.722	1.0	7–2	6–3	207	166	+41	11.50	9.22
3	Halifax Thunderbirds – x	18	11	7	.611	3.0	7–2	4–5	198	195	+3	11.00	10.83
4	Albany FireWolves – x	18	9	9	.500	5.0	5–4	4–5	198	195	+3	11.00	10.83
5	Philadelphia Wings – x	18	9	9	.500	5.0	4–5	5–4	185	199	−14	10.28	11.06
6	Georgia Swarm	18	9	9	.500	5.0	4–5	5–4	205	212	−7	11.39	11.78
7	New York Riptide	18	6	12	.333	8.0	3–6	3–6	214	226	−12	11.89	12.56
8	Rochester Knighthawks	18	4	14	.222	10.0	2–7	2–7	184	221	−37	10.22	12.28

West Conference
P	Team	GP	W	L	PCT	GB	Home	Road	GF	GA	Diff	GF/GP	GA/GP
1	San Diego Seals – xy	18	10	8	.556	0.0	5–4	5–4	202	183	+19	11.22	10.17
2	Calgary Roughnecks – x	18	10	8	.556	0.0	6–3	4–5	194	201	−7	10.78	11.17
3	Colorado Mammoth – x	18	10	8	.556	0.0	7–2	3–6	196	198	−2	10.89	11.00
4	Saskatchewan Rush	18	8	10	.444	2.0	6–3	2–7	196	194	+2	10.89	10.78
5	Panther City Lacrosse Club	18	7	11	.389	3.0	3–6	4–5	190	223	−33	10.56	12.39
6	Vancouver Warriors	18	6	12	.333	4.0	3–6	3–6	199	209	−10	11.06	11.61

== Game log ==
Game	Date	Opponent	Location	Score	OT	Attendance	Record
1	December 4, 2021	@ New York Riptide	Nassau Coliseum	W 13–12	OT	4,494	1–0
2	December 11, 2021	Buffalo Bandits	Blue Cross Arena	L 8–12		4,311	1–1
3	December 18, 2021	@ Albany FireWolves	Times Union Center	W 16–7		4,885	2–1
4	January 21, 2022	Georgia Swarm	Blue Cross Arena	L 8–12			2–2
5	January 22, 2022	@ Philadelphia Wings	Wells Fargo Center (Philadelphia)	L 10–18			2–3
6	January 29, 2022	@ Toronto Rock	FirstOntario Centre	L 8–12			2–4
7	February 5, 2022	@ Buffalo Bandits	KeyBank Center	L 8–11			2–5
8	February 12, 2022	Albany FireWolves	Blue Cross Arena	W 15–13			3–5
9	February 26, 2022	Buffalo Bandits	Blue Cross Arena	L 8–14			3–6
10	March 4, 2022	@ Georgia Swarm	Gas South Arena	L 16–17	OT		3–7
11	March 12, 2022	New York Riptide	Blue Cross Arena	L 12–15			3–8
12	March 19, 2022	@ Saskatchewan Rush	SaskTel Centre	L 6–9			3–9
13	March 26, 2022	Philadelphia Wings	Blue Cross Arena	L 8–12			3–10
14	April 1, 2022	@ Halifax Thunderbirds	Scotiabank Centre	L 7–11			3–11
15	April 9, 2022	Toronto Rock	Blue Cross Arena	L 9–11			3–12
16	April 16, 2022	@ New York Riptide	Nassau Coliseum	L 7–15			3–13
17	April 22, 2022	Calgary Roughnecks	Blue Cross Arena	W 15–7			4–13
18	April 30, 2022	Halifax Thunderbirds	Blue Cross Arena	L 10–13			4–14

== Roster ==
Rochester Knighthawks roster
Active (21-man) roster		Inactive roster	Coaches
Goaltenders: 39 (Canada) Steve Fryer; 49 (Canada) Rylan Hartley; 1 (Germany) Craig Wende; Defensemen: 20 (Canada) Matthew Bennett; 2 (Canada) Paul Dawson (C); 3 (Canada) Dylan Evans; 18 (Canada) Julian Garritano; 11 (Canada) Darryl Robertson; 34 (Israel) Doug Utting	Forwards: 16 (Canada) Phil Caputo; 19 (Canada) Holden Cattoni; 41 (Canada) Mark Cockerton; 15 (Canada) Shawn Evans (A); 5 (Canada) Turner Evans; 9 (Canada) Curtis Knight (A); 14 (Canada) Dan Lintner; 23 (Canada) Dan Michel; Transition: 83 (Haudenosaunee) Frank Brown; 96 (Canada) Cory Highfield; 17 (Canada) Ryland Rees; 26 (Canada) Thomas Whitty	Practice squad: 29 (Canada) Tyler Biles (T); 21 (Canada) Adam Perroni (T); 72 (Canada) Dustyn Pratt (D); Injured reserve: 91 (Canada) Travis Burton (D); 75 (Canada) Jay Thorimbert (D); Holdout: 45 (Canada) Chris Willman (T); Unable to play: 6 (Canada) Zac Reid (T)	Head coach {{{Head Coach}}} Legend: * Suspended list; (C) Captain; (A) Alternate captain; updated 12/2/2022; NLL Transactions

=== Entry draft ===
The 2021 NLL Entry Draft took place on August 28, 2021. The Knighthawks made the following selections:

Round	Overall	Player	College/Club
2	19	Corson Kealey	Brooklin MSL/Robert Morris
3	35	Riley Curtis	Cobourg MSL/Denver
4	50	Pent Eistrat	RIT
