= 2022 San Diego Seals season =

National Lacrosse League season

2022 San Diego Seals
- West Division Champions
- League: NLL
- Division: 1st West
- 2022 record: 10-8
- Home record: 5-4
- Road record: 5-4
- Goals for: 202
- Goals against: 183
- General Manager: Patrick Merrill
- Coach: Patrick Merrill
- Captain: Brodie Merrill
- Alternate captains: Dan Dawson; Kyle Buchanan; Cam Holding
- Arena: Pechanga Arena
- Average attendance: 5,778

The San Diego Seals are a lacrosse team based in San Diego, California. The team plays in the National Lacrosse League (NLL). The 2022 season was their third season in the NLL.

== Regular season ==
=== Final standings ===
East Conference
| P | Team | GP | W | L | PCT | GB | Home | Road | GF | GA | Diff | GF/GP | GA/GP |
|---|---|---|---|---|---|---|---|---|---|---|---|---|---|
| 1 | Buffalo Bandits – xyz | 18 | 14 | 4 | .778 | 0.0 | 7–2 | 7–2 | 247 | 185 | +62 | 13.72 | 10.28 |
| 2 | Toronto Rock – x | 18 | 13 | 5 | .722 | 1.0 | 7–2 | 6–3 | 207 | 166 | +41 | 11.50 | 9.22 |
| 3 | Halifax Thunderbirds – x | 18 | 11 | 7 | .611 | 3.0 | 7–2 | 4–5 | 198 | 195 | +3 | 11.00 | 10.83 |
| 4 | Albany FireWolves – x | 18 | 9 | 9 | .500 | 5.0 | 5–4 | 4–5 | 198 | 195 | +3 | 11.00 | 10.83 |
| 5 | Philadelphia Wings – x | 18 | 9 | 9 | .500 | 5.0 | 4–5 | 5–4 | 185 | 199 | −14 | 10.28 | 11.06 |
| 6 | Georgia Swarm | 18 | 9 | 9 | .500 | 5.0 | 4–5 | 5–4 | 205 | 212 | −7 | 11.39 | 11.78 |
| 7 | New York Riptide | 18 | 6 | 12 | .333 | 8.0 | 3–6 | 3–6 | 214 | 226 | −12 | 11.89 | 12.56 |
| 8 | Rochester Knighthawks | 18 | 4 | 14 | .222 | 10.0 | 2–7 | 2–7 | 184 | 221 | −37 | 10.22 | 12.28 |

West Conference
| P | Team | GP | W | L | PCT | GB | Home | Road | GF | GA | Diff | GF/GP | GA/GP |
|---|---|---|---|---|---|---|---|---|---|---|---|---|---|
| 1 | San Diego Seals – xy | 18 | 10 | 8 | .556 | 0.0 | 5–4 | 5–4 | 202 | 183 | +19 | 11.22 | 10.17 |
| 2 | Calgary Roughnecks – x | 18 | 10 | 8 | .556 | 0.0 | 6–3 | 4–5 | 194 | 201 | −7 | 10.78 | 11.17 |
| 3 | Colorado Mammoth – x | 18 | 10 | 8 | .556 | 0.0 | 7–2 | 3–6 | 196 | 198 | −2 | 10.89 | 11.00 |
| 4 | Saskatchewan Rush | 18 | 8 | 10 | .444 | 2.0 | 6–3 | 2–7 | 196 | 194 | +2 | 10.89 | 10.78 |
| 5 | Panther City Lacrosse Club | 18 | 7 | 11 | .389 | 3.0 | 3–6 | 4–5 | 190 | 223 | −33 | 10.56 | 12.39 |
| 6 | Vancouver Warriors | 18 | 6 | 12 | .333 | 4.0 | 3–6 | 3–6 | 199 | 209 | −10 | 11.06 | 11.61 |

== Game log ==
=== Regular season ===
| Game | Date | Opponent | Location | Score | OT | Attendance | Record |
|---|---|---|---|---|---|---|---|
| 1 | December 3, 2021 | Vancouver Warriors | Pechanga Arena | L 7–8 | | 5,633 | 0–1 |
| 2 | December 11, 2021 | @ Colorado Mammoth | Ball Arena | W 13–4 | | 8,730 | 1–1 |
| 3 | December 17, 2021 | @ Calgary Roughnecks | Scotiabank Saddledome | W 17–12 | | 9,361 | 2–1 |
| 4 | January 8, 2022 | Panther City Lacrosse Club | Pechanga Arena | W 15–12 | | 5,187 | 3–1 |
| 5 | January 14, 2022 | @ Saskatchewan Rush | SaskTel Centre | W 12–11 | | 6,999 | 4–1 |
| 6 | January 29, 2022 | Calgary Roughnecks | Pechanga Arena | W 13–10 | | 5,280 | 5–1 |
| 7 | February 12, 2022 | @ Panther City Lacrosse Club | Dickies Arena | W 10–4 | | 6,465 | 6–1 |
| 8 | February 26, 2022 | Albany FireWolves | Pechanga Arena | L 12–13 | | 5,783 | 6–2 |
| 9 | March 4, 2022 | Calgary Roughnecks | Pechanga Arena | W 9–4 | | 4,492 | 7–2 |
| 10 | March 11, 2022 | Saskatchewan Rush | Pechanga Arena | W 10–9 | | 5,345 | 8–2 |
| 11 | March 19, 2022 | Colorado Mammoth | Pechanga Arena | W 9–7 | | 8,392 | 9–2 |
| 12 | March 25, 2022 | @ Vancouver Warriors | Rogers Arena | L 12–14 | | 7,683 | 9–3 |
| 13 | April 2, 2022 | @ Toronto Rock | FirstOntario Centre | L 7–14 | | 8,549 | 9–4 |
| 14 | April 8, 2022 | Philadelphia Wings | Pechanga Arena | L 12–13 | | 5,688 | 9–5 |
| 15 | April 9, 2022 | @ Colorado Mammoth | Ball Arena | L 10–11 | | 9,560 | 9–6 |
| 16 | April 15, 2022 | Panther City Lacrosse Club | Pechanga Arena | L 10–11 | | 6,200 | 9–7 |
| 17 | April 23, 2022 | @ Saskatchewan Rush | SaskTel Centre | L 14–17 | | 10,253 | 9–8 |
| 18 | April 30, 2022 | @ Vancouver Warriors | Rogers Arena | W 10–9 | | 9,083 | 10–8 |

=== Playoffs ===
| Game | Date | Opponent | Location | Score | OT | Attendance | Record |
|---|---|---|---|---|---|---|---|
| Western Conference semi-final | May 7, 2022 | Philadelphia Wings | Pechanga Arena San Diego | W 9–8 | | 6,726 | 1–0 |
| Western Conference final (game 1) | May 13, 2022 | Colorado Mammoth | Pechanga Arena San Diego | L 12–14 | | 6,317 | 1–1 |
| Western Conference final (game 2) | May 21, 2022 | Colorado Mammoth | Pechanga Arena San Diego | W 11–10 | OT | 10,545 | 2–1 |
| Western Conference final (game 3) | May 28, 2022 | Colorado Mammoth | Pechanga Arena San Diego | L 13–15 | | 7,114 | 2–2 |

== Roster ==
San Diego Seals roster
| Active (21-man) roster | | Inactive roster | Coaches |
|---|---|---|---|
| Goaltenders: 85 (Canada) Tyler Carlson; 92 (England) Frank Scigliano; Defensemen: 44 (Canada) Graydon Bradley; 52 (United States) Garett Epple; 11 (United States) Mark Glicini; 25 (United States) Eli Gobrecht; 19 (Canada) Cam Holding; 3 (Canada) Garrett McIntosh; 17 (Canada) Brodie Merrill; 7 (Canada) Tor Reinholdt; 12 (Canada) Matt Sykes | Forwards: 14 (Canada) Wesley Berg; 91 (Canada) Kyle Buchanan; 5 (United States) Connor Fields; 88 (Canada) Zack Greer; 81 (Canada) Connor Kearnan; 22 (Canada) Evan Messenger; 45 (Canada) Jeremy Noble; Transition: 2 (Canada) Drew Belgrave; 63 (Canada) Brandon Clelland | Practice squad: 77 (United States) Jules Heningburg; 4 (Canada) Ethan Schott; 59 (United States) Mikie Schlosser; Injured reserve: 21 (Canada) Casey Jackson; 33 (United States) Zach Miller; 30 (Canada) Johnny Pearson; 83 (Haudenosaunee) Austin Staats | Head coach: Patrick Merrill; Assistant coaches: Josh Sanderson; Bill Greer; Legend: * Suspended list; (C) Captain; (A) Alternate captain; Roster updated 2019-01-18; NLL Transactions |

=== Entry Draft ===
The 2021 NLL Entry Draft took place on August 28, 2021. The Seals made the following selections:

| Round | Overall | Player | College/Club |
|---|---|---|---|
| 1 | 5 | Mike McCannell | Oakville MSL/Stonybrook |
| 1 | 9 | Patrick Shoemay | New Westminster Salmonbellies Jr. A/RIT |
| 1 | 13 | Jacob Dunbar | Port Coquitlam Jr. A |
| 2 | 23 | Chris Origlieri | Orangeville |
| 3 | 47 | Jerry Staats | Six Nations MSL/Syracuse |
| 4 | 52 | Garrett Winter | Port Coquitlam Jr. A/SFU |
| 5 | 64 | Jeff Trainor | Archers PLL/UMass |
| 5 | 67 | Reed Rezanka | Endicott College |
| 6 | 81 | Teddy Legget | St. Catharines Jr. A/Lehigh |

== Media ==
In November 2023, a five-part docuseries recounting the Seals' 2022 season was released on Amazon Prime. It was titled War on the Floor: A Season with the San Diego Seals.

== See also ==
- 2022 NLL season
