= 2022 Saskatchewan Rush season =

Lacrosse team season

2022 Saskatchewan Rush
- League: NLL
- Division: 4th West
- 2022 record: 8–10
- Home record: 6–3
- Road record: 2–7
- Goals for: 196
- Goals against: 194
- General Manager: Derek Keenan
- Coach: Derek Keenan
- Captain: Chris Corbeil
- Alternate captains: Brett Mydske; Kyle Rubisch
- Arena: SaskTel Centre

The Saskatchewan Rush are a lacrosse team based in Saskatoon, Saskatchewan playing in the National Lacrosse League (NLL). The 2022 season is the 16th in franchise history, 6th in Saskatchewan.

== Current standings ==
East Conference
P	Team	GP	W	L	PCT	GB	Home	Road	GF	GA	Diff	GF/GP	GA/GP
1	Buffalo Bandits – xyz	18	14	4	.778	0.0	7–2	7–2	247	185	+62	13.72	10.28
2	Toronto Rock – x	18	13	5	.722	1.0	7–2	6–3	207	166	+41	11.50	9.22
3	Halifax Thunderbirds – x	18	11	7	.611	3.0	7–2	4–5	198	195	+3	11.00	10.83
4	Albany FireWolves – x	18	9	9	.500	5.0	5–4	4–5	198	195	+3	11.00	10.83
5	Philadelphia Wings – x	18	9	9	.500	5.0	4–5	5–4	185	199	−14	10.28	11.06
6	Georgia Swarm	18	9	9	.500	5.0	4–5	5–4	205	212	−7	11.39	11.78
7	New York Riptide	18	6	12	.333	8.0	3–6	3–6	214	226	−12	11.89	12.56
8	Rochester Knighthawks	18	4	14	.222	10.0	2–7	2–7	184	221	−37	10.22	12.28

West Conference
P	Team	GP	W	L	PCT	GB	Home	Road	GF	GA	Diff	GF/GP	GA/GP
1	San Diego Seals – xy	18	10	8	.556	0.0	5–4	5–4	202	183	+19	11.22	10.17
2	Calgary Roughnecks – x	18	10	8	.556	0.0	6–3	4–5	194	201	−7	10.78	11.17
3	Colorado Mammoth – x	18	10	8	.556	0.0	7–2	3–6	196	198	−2	10.89	11.00
4	Saskatchewan Rush	18	8	10	.444	2.0	6–3	2–7	196	194	+2	10.89	10.78
5	Panther City Lacrosse Club	18	7	11	.389	3.0	3–6	4–5	190	223	−33	10.56	12.39
6	Vancouver Warriors	18	6	12	.333	4.0	3–6	3–6	199	209	−10	11.06	11.61

== Game log ==
=== Regular season ===
Game	Date	Opponent	Location	Score	OT	Attendance	Record
1	December 4, 2021	@ Halifax Thunderbirds	Scotiabank Centre	L 11–12	OT	7,488	0–1
2	December 11, 2021	Calgary Roughnecks	SaskTel Centre	L 10–11		9,116	0–2
3	December 17, 2021	@ Vancouver Warriors	Rogers Arena	W 10–9		6,083	1–2
4	January 8, 2022	@ Albany FireWolves	MVP Arena	L 5–10		4,651	1–3
5	January 14, 2022	San Diego Seals	SaskTel Centre	L 11–12		6,999	1–4
6	January 29, 2022	Panther City Lacrosse Club	SaskTel Centre	W 16–7		8,606	2–4
7	February 12, 2022	@ Vancouver Warriors	Rogers Arena	L 7–13			2–5
8	February 20, 2022	@ Colorado Mammoth	Ball Arena	L 10–12			2–6
9	February 26, 2022	Colorado Mammoth	SaskTel Centre	W 10–9	OT	9,302	3–6
10	March 5, 2022	@ Panther City Lacrosse Club	Dickies Arena	L 16–17	OT	4,741	3–7
11	March 11, 2022	@ San Diego Seals	Pechanga Arena	L 9–10		5,345	3–8
12	March 17, 2022	@ Calgary Roughnecks	Scotiabank Saddledome	L 12–14		8,590	3–9
13	March 19, 2022	Rochester Knighthawks	SaskTel Centre	W 9–6		9,012	4–9
14	March 26, 2022	Calgary Roughnecks	SaskTel Centre	L 6–8		9,427	4–10
15	April 9, 2022	Vancouver Warriors	SaskTel Centre	W 15–13		9,324	5–10
16	April 16, 2022	Colorado Mammoth	SaskTel Centre	W 9–8		8,488	6–10
17	April 23, 2022	San Diego Seals	SaskTel Centre	W 17–14			7–10
18	April 30, 2022	@ Panther City Lacrosse Club	Dickies Arena	W 13–9			8–10

== Current roster ==
Saskatchewan Rush roster
Active (21-man) roster		Inactive roster	Coaches
Goaltenders: 31 (Canada) Adam Shute; 35 (Canada) Evan Kirk; Defensemen: 20 (Canada) Travis Cornwall; 94 (Canada) Matt Hossack; 8 (Canada) Mike Messenger; 4 (Canada) Kyle Rubisch (A); 23 (Canada) Ryan Dilks; 70 (Canada) Holden Garlent; 53 (Canada) Justin Robinson	Forwards: 17 (Canada) Robert Church; 32 (Canada) Matthew Dinsdale; 25 (Canada) Ryan Keenan; 42 (Canada) Mark Matthews (A); 90 (Canada) Ben McIntosh; 3 (Canada) Connor Robinson; 77 (Iroquois) Jeff Shattler; 11 (Canada) Austin Murphy; Transition: 16 (Canada) Chris Corbeil (C); 19 (Canada) Jordi Jones-Smith; 74 (Iroquois) Jeremy Thompson; 13 (Canada) Jeff Cornwall	Practice squad: 12 (Canada) Zach Gould; 88 (Canada) Cameron Dunkerley; 65 (Canada) Ryan McLean; 44 (Australia) Tristan Rai	Head coach {{{Head Coach}}} Legend: * Suspended list; (C) Captain; (A) Alternate captain; Roster updated 2019-04-18; NLL Transactions

=== Entry draft ===
The 2021 NLL Entry Draft took place on August 28, 2021. The Rush made the following selections:

Round	Overall	Player	College/Club
1	7	Jake Boudreau	Brampton Jr. A/Robert Morris
1	8	Ryan Barnable	Whitby Jr. A/RIT
2	29	Mackenzie Burke	Brampton Jr. A
3	43	Ethan Forgrave	St. Albert Jr. A/McGill
3	45	Mason Kamminga	Six Nations MSL/Detroit Mercy
4	60	Troy Gutowski	Saskatchewan SWAT Jr. A
5	75	Keagan White	Saskatchewan Jr. A
6	89	Jordan Tabin	Saskatchewan SWAT Jr. A

== See also ==
- 2022 NLL season
