= 2022 Calgary Roughnecks season =

2022 Calgary Roughnecks
- League: NLL
- Division: West
- 2022 record: 10-8
- Home record: 6-3
- Road record: 4-5
- Goals for: 194
- Goals against: 201
- General Manager: Mike Board
- Coach: Curt Malawsky
- Captain: Curtis Dickson
- Alternate captains: Jesse King, Curtis Manning
- Arena: Scotiabank Saddledome

Team leaders
- Goals: Curtis Dickson (42)
- Assists: Jesse King (66)
- Points: Jesse King (95)
- Penalties in minutes: Reece Callies (25)
- Ground Balls: Zach Currier (237)
- Wins: Christian Del Bianco (10)
- Goals against average: Christian Del Bianco (11.04)

The Calgary Roughnecks are a lacrosse team based in Calgary, Alberta. The team plays in the National Lacrosse League (NLL). The 2022 season is the 20th in franchise history.

== Final standings ==
East Conference
P	Team	GP	W	L	PCT	GB	Home	Road	GF	GA	Diff	GF/GP	GA/GP
1	Buffalo Bandits – xyz	18	14	4	.778	0.0	7–2	7–2	247	185	+62	13.72	10.28
2	Toronto Rock – x	18	13	5	.722	1.0	7–2	6–3	207	166	+41	11.50	9.22
3	Halifax Thunderbirds – x	18	11	7	.611	3.0	7–2	4–5	198	195	+3	11.00	10.83
4	Albany FireWolves – x	18	9	9	.500	5.0	5–4	4–5	198	195	+3	11.00	10.83
5	Philadelphia Wings – x	18	9	9	.500	5.0	4–5	5–4	185	199	−14	10.28	11.06
6	Georgia Swarm	18	9	9	.500	5.0	4–5	5–4	205	212	−7	11.39	11.78
7	New York Riptide	18	6	12	.333	8.0	3–6	3–6	214	226	−12	11.89	12.56
8	Rochester Knighthawks	18	4	14	.222	10.0	2–7	2–7	184	221	−37	10.22	12.28

West Conference
P	Team	GP	W	L	PCT	GB	Home	Road	GF	GA	Diff	GF/GP	GA/GP
1	San Diego Seals – xy	18	10	8	.556	0.0	5–4	5–4	202	183	+19	11.22	10.17
2	Calgary Roughnecks – x	18	10	8	.556	0.0	6–3	4–5	194	201	−7	10.78	11.17
3	Colorado Mammoth – x	18	10	8	.556	0.0	7–2	3–6	196	198	−2	10.89	11.00
4	Saskatchewan Rush	18	8	10	.444	2.0	6–3	2–7	196	194	+2	10.89	10.78
5	Panther City Lacrosse Club	18	7	11	.389	3.0	3–6	4–5	190	223	−33	10.56	12.39
6	Vancouver Warriors	18	6	12	.333	4.0	3–6	3–6	199	209	−10	11.06	11.61

=== Regular season ===
Game	Date	Opponent	Location	Score	OT	Attendance	Record
1	December 4, 2021	@ Buffalo Bandits	KeyBank Center	L 9–16		7,395	0–1
2	December 11, 2021	@ Saskatchewan Rush	SaskTel Centre	W 11–10		9,116	1–1
3	December 17, 2021	San Diego Seals	Scotiabank Saddledome	L 12–17		9,361	1–2
4	January 29, 2022	@ San Diego Seals	Pechanga Arena	L 10–13		5,280	1–3
5	February 5, 2022	@ Colorado Mammoth	Ball Arena	L 10–14			1–4
6	February 11, 2022	Colorado Mammoth	Scotiabank Saddledome	W 9–7			2–4
7	February 18, 2022	Vancouver Warriors	Scotiabank Saddledome	L 10–11			2–5
8	February 20, 2022	@ Panther City Lacrosse Club	Dickies Arena	W 13–12			3–5
9	March 4, 2022	@ San Diego Seals	Pechanga Arena	L 4–9			3–6
10	March 17, 2022	Saskatchewan Rush	Scotiabank Saddledome	W 14–12			4–6
11	March 19, 2022	Panther City Lacrosse Club	Scotiabank Saddledome	L 11–14			4–7
12	March 26, 2022	@ Saskatchewan Rush	SaskTel Centre	W 8–6			5–7
13	April 1, 2022	Vancouver Warriors	Scotiabank Saddledome	W 10–9			6–7
14	April 8, 2022	Halifax Thunderbirds	Scotiabank Saddledome	W 13–8			7–7
15	April 9, 2022	Panther City Lacrosse Club	Scotiabank Saddledome	W 14–4			8–7
16	April 16, 2022	@ Vancouver Warriors	Rogers Arena	W 15–13			9–7
17	April 22, 2022	@ Rochester Knighthawks	Blue Cross Arena	L 7–15			9–8
18	April 30, 2022	Colorado Mammoth	Scotiabank Saddledome	W 14–11			10–8

=== Playoffs ===
Game	Date	Opponent	Location	Score	OT	Attendance	Record
Western conference semi-final	May 6, 2022	Colorado Mammoth	Scotiabank Saddledome	L 12–16			0–1

== Roster ==
Calgary Roughnecks roster
Active (21-man) roster		Inactive roster	Coaches
Goaltenders: 35 (Canada) Christian Del Bianco; Landon Kells; Defensemen: Tyler Burton; Reece Callies; Kellen LeClair; Liam LeClair; Curtis Manning; Harrison Matsuoka; Carter McKenzie; Andrew Mullen; 13 (Canada) Eli Salama; Nick Scott; Shane Simpson; Ethan Ticehurst; Nate Wade	Forwards: Tanner Cook; 17 (Canada) Curtis Dickson; (Canada) Haiden Dickson; Zach Herreweyers; Jesse King; Marshal King; 68 (Canada) Tyler Pace; Cole Pickup; 26 (Canada) Dan Taylor; Kyle Waters; Transition: 77 (Canada) Zach Currier; 55 (Canada) Mitch Wilde		Head coach: Curt Malawsky; Assistant coaches: Bob McMahon; Rob Williams; Legend: * Suspended list; (C) Captain; (A) Alternate captain; updated 2022-10-28; NLL Transactions

=== Entry Draft ===
The 2021 NLL Entry Draft took place on August 28, 2021. The Roughnecks made the following selections:

Round	Overall	Player	College/Club
1	6	Kyle Waters	Brooklin MSL/Detroit Mercy
1	10	Justin Inacio	Brooklin MSL/Ohio State
2	20	Dylan McIntosh	Maple Ridge WLA/Hofstra
3	38	Carter McKenzie	Queen's University CUFLA
4	53	Adam Bland	Victoria Jr. A
5	68	Daire Newbrough	Guelph Jr. A/St. Bonaventure
6	82	Tyler Yanko	Burnaby WLA/Hobart

== See also ==
- 2022 NLL season
