= 2022 NLL season =

- League: National Lacrosse League
- Sport: Indoor lacrosse (box lacrosse)
- Duration: December 3, 2021 — June 18, 2022
- Games: 18
- Teams: 14
- TV partner(s): ESPN (United States); TSN (Canada)

Draft
- Top draft pick: Jonathan Donville
- Picked by: Panther City Lacrosse Club

Regular Season
- Top seed: Buffalo Bandits
- Season MVP: Dhane Smith (Buffalo Bandits)
- Top scorer: Dhane Smith (Buffalo Bandits)

Playoffs
- Finals champions: Colorado Mammoth (2nd title)
- Runners-up: Buffalo Bandits
- Finals MVP: Dillon Ward (Mammoth)

NLL seasons
- ← 2020 season 2023 season →

The 2022 National Lacrosse League season, formally known as the 2021–2022 season, was the 35th in the history of the NLL. The season began on December 3, 2021, and ended with the NLL final in late spring of 2022. This was the inaugural season for the expansion team Panther City Lacrosse Club, and the Albany FireWolves who relocated from New England. The NLL returned after missing a season due to the COVID-19 pandemic.

The Colorado Mammoth defeated the Buffalo Bandits in a best of three series to win its first championship since 2006.

The 2022 season was the start of a multi-year broadcasting deal with ESPN.

== Teams ==
2022 National Lacrosse League
Division	Team	City	Arena	Capacity
East	Albany FireWolves	Albany, New York	MVP Arena	14,236
East	Buffalo Bandits	Buffalo, New York	KeyBank Center	19,070
East	Georgia Swarm	Duluth, Georgia	Gas South Arena	10,500
East	Halifax Thunderbirds	Halifax, Nova Scotia	Scotiabank Centre	10,500
East	New York Riptide	Uniondale, New York	Nassau Veterans Memorial Coliseum	13,917
East	Rochester Knighthawks	Rochester, New York	Blue Cross Arena	10,662
East	Philadelphia Wings	Philadelphia, Pennsylvania	Wells Fargo Center	19,306
East	Toronto Rock	Toronto, Ontario	Scotiabank Arena	18,800
West	Calgary Roughnecks	Calgary, Alberta	Scotiabank Saddledome	19,289
West	Colorado Mammoth	Denver, Colorado	Ball Arena	18,000
West	Panther City Lacrosse Club	Fort Worth, Texas	Dickies Arena	12,200
West	San Diego Seals	San Diego, California	Pechanga Arena	12,920
West	Saskatchewan Rush	Saskatoon, Saskatchewan	SaskTel Centre	15,195
West	Vancouver Warriors	Vancouver, British Columbia	Rogers Arena	18,910

=== Map of teams ===
East Division West Division

== Regular season ==
East Conference
P	Team	GP	W	L	PCT	GB	Home	Road	GF	GA	Diff	GF/GP	GA/GP
1	Buffalo Bandits – xyz	18	14	4	.778	0.0	7–2	7–2	247	185	+62	13.72	10.28
2	Toronto Rock – x	18	13	5	.722	1.0	7–2	6–3	207	166	+41	11.50	9.22
3	Halifax Thunderbirds – x	18	11	7	.611	3.0	7–2	4–5	198	195	+3	11.00	10.83
4	Albany FireWolves – x	18	9	9	.500	5.0	5–4	4–5	198	195	+3	11.00	10.83
5	Philadelphia Wings – x	18	9	9	.500	5.0	4–5	5–4	185	199	−14	10.28	11.06
6	Georgia Swarm	18	9	9	.500	5.0	4–5	5–4	205	212	−7	11.39	11.78
7	New York Riptide	18	6	12	.333	8.0	3–6	3–6	214	226	−12	11.89	12.56
8	Rochester Knighthawks	18	4	14	.222	10.0	2–7	2–7	184	221	−37	10.22	12.28

West Conference
P	Team	GP	W	L	PCT	GB	Home	Road	GF	GA	Diff	GF/GP	GA/GP
1	San Diego Seals – xy	18	10	8	.556	0.0	5–4	5–4	202	183	+19	11.22	10.17
2	Calgary Roughnecks – x	18	10	8	.556	0.0	6–3	4–5	194	201	−7	10.78	11.17
3	Colorado Mammoth – x	18	10	8	.556	0.0	7–2	3–6	196	198	−2	10.89	11.00
4	Saskatchewan Rush	18	8	10	.444	2.0	6–3	2–7	196	194	+2	10.89	10.78
5	Panther City Lacrosse Club	18	7	11	.389	3.0	3–6	4–5	190	223	−33	10.56	12.39
6	Vancouver Warriors	18	6	12	.333	4.0	3–6	3–6	199	209	−10	11.06	11.61

== Scoring leaders ==
Note: GP = Games played; G = Goals; A = Assists; Pts = Points; PIM = Penalty minutes; LB = Loose Balls

Player	Team	GP	G	A	Pts	PIM	LB
Dhane Smith	Buffalo Bandits	18	41	94	135	10	93
Ryan Lee	Colorado Mammoth	18	34	85	119	13	68
Joe Resetarits	Albany FireWolves	18	47	64	111	0	58
Jeff Teat	New York Riptide	16	37	71	108	2	111
Lyle Thompson	Georgia Swarm	17	47	55	102	8	107
Keegan Bal	Vancouver Warriors	17	44	55	99	4	93
Josh Byrne	Buffalo Bandits	18	37	62	99	12	74
Jesse King	Calgary Roughnecks	18	29	66	95	6	104
Robert Church	Saskatchewan Rush	18	38	56	94	4	74
Mark Matthews	Saskatchewan Rush	18	30	62	92	10	59

== Leading goaltenders ==
Note: GP = Games played; Mins = Minutes played; W = Wins; L = Losses: GA = Goals Allowed; SV% = Save Percentage; GAA = Goals against average

Player	Team	GP	Mins	W	L	GA	SV%	GAA
Nick Rose	Toronto Rock	18	1007	13	3	152	0.802	9.05
Frankie Scigliano	San Diego Seals	16	926	8	8	151	0.793	9.78
Matt Vinc	Buffalo Bandits	18	1063	14	4	179	0.806	10.10
Eric Penney	Philadelphia/Saskatchewan	11	477	4	3	81	0.774	10.18
Warren Hill	Halifax Thunderbirds	17	892	9	6	152	0.783	10.21

== Playoffs ==
Conference Semifinal
E1	Buffalo	10
E4	Albany	5
Eastern Conference
E2	Toronto	14*
E3	Halifax	13
W1	San Diego	9
WC	Philadelphia	8
Western Conference
W2	Calgary	12
W3	Colorado	16

Conference Final (best of 3)
E1	Buffalo	2
E2	Toronto	0
W1	San Diego	1
W3	Colorado	2

NLL Final (best of 3)
E1	Buffalo	1
W3	Colorado	2

*Overtime

=== Conference Semifinal ===
==== (E1) Buffalo Bandits vs. (E4) Albany FireWolves ====
May 7, 2022	Buffalo Bandits	10–5 (1–1, 1–1, 4–2, 4–1)	Albany FireWolves	KeyBank Center; Attendance: 12,535

Game reference

Matt Vinc
Goalies
Doug Jamieson

	0–1	09:17 – O'Connor (Benesch) (PP)
Smith (Byrne) – 10:17	1–1
	1–2	18:42 – Resetarits (O'Connor, Ruest)
MacKay (Spanger) – 28:00	2–2
Smith (Buchanan) – 30:14	3–2
Byrne (Nanticoke, Brownwell) – 31:32	4–2
	4–3	33:48 – Ruest (O'Connor, Watkinson)
Byrne (Smith, Fields) – 38:04	5–3
	5–4	39:05 – O'Connor (Kitchen, Chaykowsky)
Fields (Cloutier, Byrne) (PP) – 41:16	6–4
Cloutier (Smith, Fields) – 49:52	7–4
	7–5	50:19 – Watkinson (Malcom)
Fields (Buchanan, Smith) – 57:31	8–5
Brown (Priolo, Brownwell) (ENG) – 58:20	9–5
Priolo (Smith, Brownwell) (ENG) – 59:01	10–5

8 min
Penalties
10 min
59
Shots
50

==== (E2) Toronto Rock vs. (E3) Halifax Thunderbirds ====
May 6, 2022	Toronto Rock	14–13 OT (5–1, 4–2, 3–5, 1–5, 1–0)	Halifax Thunderbirds	FirstOntario Centre; Attendance: 7,241

Game reference

Nick Rose
Goalies
Warren Hill
Aaron Bold

Schreiber (Hellyer, Burns) – 03:18	1–0
Manns (Schreiber, McKenna) – 06:34	2–0
Harris – 07:28	3–0
Schreiber (Kri, Burns) – 10:57	4–0
de Snoo (Kri) – 11:56	5–0
	5–1	12:28 – Fannell (Jamieson)
Hellyer (McKenna, Slade) – 21:21	6–1
	6–2	21:31 – Terefenko (Withers)
Dawson (Rogers, Craig) (PP) – 26:09	7–2
	7–3	27:03 – Shanks (Terefenko)
de Snoo (Harris) – 27:38	8–3
Craig (Hellyer, Harris) – 28:42	9–3
	9–4	30:20 – Withers
	9–5	33:38 – Jamieson (Petterson, Shanks) (PP)
	9–6	36:14 – Shanks (Petterson, Jamieson) (PP)
	9–7	40:35 – Bell (Terefenko)
Hellyer (Schreiber, Manns) – 38:15	10–7
	10–8	45:28 – Jamieson (Fannell, Keogh)
Manns (Hellyer, de Snoo) – 42:57	11–8
Dawson (Craig, Manns) – 44:42	12–8
	12–9	46:59 – Gillies (Bell)
	12–10	48:54 – Petterson (Fannell, Terefenko)
	12–11	50:18 – Keogh (Jamieson, Robinson)
	12–12	50:33 – Theede (Petterson, Boushy)
	12–13
Schreiber (Craig, Manns) – 52:20	13–13
Rogers – 62:27	14–13

8 min
Penalties
8 min
56
Shots
54

==== (W1) San Diego Seals vs. (WC) Philadelphia Wings ====
May 7, 2022	San Diego Seals	9–8 (3–2, 2–2, 3–3, 1–1)	Philadelphia Wings	Pechanga Arena; Attendance: 6,726

Game reference

Frankie Scigliano
Goalies
Zach Higgins

Berg (Dobbie, Staats) (PP) – 03:30	1–0
Dobbie (Noble, Belgrave) – 05:03	2–0
	2–1	11:37 – Charbonneau (Higgins)
	2–2	12:41 – Matisz (PP)
Berg – 13:58	3–2
Shoemay (Gobrecht) – 15:40	4–2
	4–3	23:52 – Rambo (Crowley, McIntosh) (PP)
Noble (Dobbie, Staats) – 25:41	5–3
	5–4	29:41 – Jackson (McIntosh, Crowley)
	5–5	36:12 – Rambo (Crowley, McIntosh)
Staats (Noble) – 40:26	6–5
Staats (Jackson, Noble) – 40:49	7–5
	7–6	41:38 – Matisz (Crowley, Small) (PP)
Shoemay (Leclaire) – 42:50	8–6
	8–7	44:32 – Rambo
Dobbie (Berg, Staats) – 51:58	9–7
	9–8	55:32 – Jackson (McIntosh, Crowley)

8 min
Penalties
4 min
61
Shots
52

==== (W2) Calgary Roughnecks vs. (W3) Colorado Mammoth ====
May 6, 2022	Calgary Roughnecks	12–16 (4–3, 2–4, 3–4, 2–1)	Colorado Mammoth	Scotiabank Saddledome; Attendance: 6,000

Game reference

Christian Del Bianco
Goalies
Dillon Ward

	0–1	04:31 – Gilles (Cupido)
H. Dickson (Simpson, Salama) – 04:59	1–1
	1–2	08:30 – Robinson (McLaughlin, Lee)
	1–3	10:44– Robinson (Lee, Chaster)
Pace (Taylor, Cook) – 11:19	2–3
Herreweyers (C. Dickson) – 12:16	3–3
King (Pace, C. Dickson) – 12:45	4–3
	4–4	16:12 – McLaughlin (Wardle, Kinnear)
	4–5	18:51 – Robinson (Lee) (PP)
Pace (C. Dickson) (PP) – 23:23	5–5
	5–6	25:35 – Lee (Wardle, Gilles)
	5–7	25:59 – McLaughlin (Williams, Lee)
Herreweyers (King, C. Dickson) (PP) – 28:59	6–7
King (Wilde) – 30:30	7–7
King (C. Dickson, Pace) – 33:21	8–7
	8–8	36:16 – McLaughlin (Williams)
Herreweyers (Pace, Cook) – 37:33	9–8
	9–9	39:40 – Wardle (Lee, Robinson)
	9–10	43:31 – Robinson (Lee, Gibson)
	9–11	43:59 – Robinson (Wardle, Lee)
	9–12	48:48 – Lee (Wardle, McLaughlin)
Taylor (King, C. Dickson) – 49:48	10–12
Salama – 53:27	11–12
	11–13	53:48 – Williams (Edwards)
	11–14	57:09 – Gibson (Lee, McLaughlin)
	11–15	58:05 – Cupido (Gilles) (ENG)
	11–16	58:17 – Gilles (Edwards)
Pace (King) – 59:15	12–16

4 min
Penalties
6 min
47
Shots
53

=== Conference Final (best of three) ===
==== (E1) Buffalo Bandits vs. (E2) Toronto Rock ====
May 15, 2022	Buffalo Bandits	18–17 (5–3, 5–5, 2–4, 6–5)	Toronto Rock	KeyBank Center; Attendance: 10,258

Game reference

Matt Vinc
Goalies
Nick Rose

Byrne (Smith) – 00:33	1–0
	1–1	00:57 – Hellyer (Schreiber)
MacKay – 01:56	2–1
	2–2	02:24 – Manns (Craig, Schreiber)
Fields (Weiss) – 06:25	3–2
Priolo – 06:57	4–2
Smith (Byrne) – 10:56	5–2
	5–3	13:46 – Scott (Hellyer)
	5–4	16:14 – Manns (Slade)
	5–5	19:05 – Schreiber (Dawson)
	5–6	20:32 – Schreiber (de Snoo)
	5–7	21:32 – Manns (Hellyer, Schreiber)
Fraser (Byrne) – 23:36	6–7
Smith (Byrne) – 24:29	7–7
Fraser (Byrne, Smith) – 27:06	8–7
Cloutier (Buchanan, Fields) – 27:32	9–7
Cloutier (Fields, Smith) – 28:05	10–7
	10–8	29:58 – Rogers (Craig)
Byrne (Nanticoke, Smith) – 30:33	11–8
Cloutier (Smith, Byrne) – 35:18	12–8
	12–9	37:08 – Craig (Schreiber, Rogers)
	12–10	37:36 – Manns
	12–11	41:14 – Rogers (Craig, Manns)
	12–12	43:28 – Craig (Schreiber, Dawson)
	12–13	46:04 – Slade (de Snoo)
	12–14	47:38 – Rogers (Dawson, Scott)
Buchanan (Byrne, Smith) – 48:34	13–14
Byrne (Cloutier, Fraser) – 49:51	14–14
Byrne (Smith, Cloutier) – 50:30	15–14
Nanticoke (Fraser, Priolo) – 51:19	16–14
Fields – 52:13	17–14
	17–15	54:37– Hellyer (Rogers, Scott)
	17–16	57:11 – Scott (Dawson, Hellyer)
Smith (Byrne, MacKay) – 58:04	18–16
	18–17	59:51 – Schreiber (Craig, Scott)

2 min
Penalties
0 min
51
Shots
58

May 21, 2022	Toronto Rock	9–10 (1–2, 1–1, 2–3, 5–4)	Buffalo Bandits	FirstOntario Centre; Attendance: 7,992

Game reference

Nick Rose
Goalies
Matt Vinc

	0–1	02:17 – Buchanan
Slade (Hellyer, Kri) – 08:23	1–1
	1–2	12:13 – Byrne (Cloutier, Priolo)
	1–3	17:28 – Fields (Smith, Buchanan)
Harris (Kri, Slade) – 20:27	2–3
Schreiber (Jubenville, Rose) – 33:06	3–3
	3–4	33:25 – Cloutier (Smith, Byrne)
Jubenville (Harris) – 35:29	4–4
	4–5	36:58 – Smith (Byrne) (PP)
	4–6	42:40 – Cloutier (Byrne, Smith) (PP)
Schreiber (Hellyer, Manns) – 45:49	5–6
	5–7	48:17 – Smith (Fields, Byrne)
	5–8	49:12 – Fraser (Cloutier, Byrne)
	5–9	53:10 – Byrne (Smith, MacKay)
Hellyer (Schreiber, Kri) – 53:51	6–9
Hellyer (Rogers) – 54:48	7–9
Craig (Schreiber, Hellyer) – 54:19	8–9
	8–10	56:26 – Fraser (Nanticoke, Byrne)
Schreiber (Craig, Manns) – 59:14	9–10

6 min
Penalties
10 min
49
Shots
51

Bandits win series 2–0.

==== (W1) San Diego Seals vs. (W3) Colorado Mammoth ====
May 13, 2022	San Diego Seals	12–14 (5–3, 4–3, 1–5, 2–3)	Colorado Mammoth	Pechanga Arena; Attendance: 6,317

Game reference

Frankie Scigliano
Christopher Origlieri
Goalies
Dillon Ward

	0–1	00:36 – Williams (McLaughlin, Wardle)
Staats (Dobbie, Noble) – 01:51	1–1
Berg (Noble, Jackson) – 03:03	2–1
Jackson (Dobbie, Staats) (PP) – 04:56	3–1
	3–2	05:30 – Williams (Wardle, Kinnear)
	3–3	05:56 – Robinson (McLaughlin, Chaster)
Leclaire (Berg, Gobrecht) – 08:45	4–3
Jackson (Noble, Leclaire) – 10:08	5–3
	5–4	17:24 – Robinson (Williams, McLaughlin)
	5–5	17:57 – Robinson (Chaster, Gilles)
Noble – 21:20	6–5
Shoemay (Dobbie, Reinholdt) (SH) – 22:46	7–5
	7–6	23:20 – Williams (Gibson) (PP)
Dobbie (Noble, Staats) (PP) – 26:39	8–6
Dobbie (Staats, Sykes) – 29:08	9–6
	9–7	33:03 – McLaughlin (Kinnear, Robinson)
	9–8	33:43 – Cupido (Ward)
	9–9	35:26 – McLaughlin (Gibson) (PP)
	9–10	38:21 – Robinson (Gibson, Hope)
	9–11	40:27 – Williams (McLaughlin, Wardle)
O'Keefe (Dobbie) – 41:47	10–11
Dobbie (Staats, Berg) – 51:18	11–11
	11–12	54:23 – Kinnear (Wardle, McLaughlin)
Leclaire (Merrill) – 54:34	12–12
	12–13	55:22 – Williams (Gibson)
	12–14	56:15 – McLaughlin (Robinson)

10 min
Penalties
6 min
48
Shots
44

May 21, 2022	Colorado Mammoth	10–11 OT (2–3, 1–2, 4–2, 3–3, 0–1)	San Diego Seals	Ball Arena; Attendance: 10,545

Game reference

Dillon Ward
Goalies
Frankie Scigliano

McLaughlin (Kinnear, Joaquim) – 03:00	1–0
	1–1	04:26 – Staats (Dobbie, Noble)
	1–2	06:25 – Staats (Berg, Hickey) (PP)
	1–3	11:59 – Dobbie (Berg, Leclaire)
McLaughlin (McIntyre, Williams) – 12:12	2–3
	2–4	16:47 – Dobbie (Holding, Shoemay)
	2–5	25:39 – Dobbie (Noble, McCannell)
McLaughlin (Robinson, Wardle) – 26:32	3–5
Kinnear (McLaughlin, Hope) – 31:36	4–5
McIntyre – 35:28	5–5
Gibson (Kinnear, Joaquim) – 37:30	6–5
Cupido (Edwards) – 38:31	7–5
	7–6	39:20 – Staats (Berg)
	7–7	42:44 – Staats (Dobbie, Noble)
McLaughlin (Robinson) (PP) – 47:56	8–7
McLaughlin (Gibson, Robinson) – 51:12	9–7
	9–8	51:47 – Greer (Jackson, Hickey)
	9–9	53:14 – Staats (Jackson, Berg)
	9–10	56:54 – Greer (Berg, Noble)
McLaughlin (Gibson, Williams) – 59:00	10–10
	10–11	62:26 – Dobbie (Noble, Jackson)

2 min
Penalties
2 min
52
Shots
52

May 28, 2022	San Diego Seals	13–15 (2–2, 7–3, 0–3, 4–7)	Colorado Mammoth	Pechanga Arena; Attendance: 7,114

Game reference

Frankie Scigliano
Christopher Origlieri
Goalies
Dillon Ward

	0–1	03:17 – Turner (Wardle, Edwards)
Greer (Noble, Jackson) – 05:25	1–1
	1–2	11:18 – Williams (McLaughlin, Robinson)
Greer (Berg) – 12:46	2–2
	2–3	19:51 – Gibson (McLaughlin) (PP)
Berg (Noble) – 20:15	3–3
Jackson (Noble, Staats) – 21:32	4–3
Staats (Leclaire, Belgrave) – 21:52	5–3
	5–4	22:19 – Robinson (McLaughlin, Kinnear)
Shoemay (McCannell) – 23:42	6–4
Berg (Dobbie, Noble) – 25:21	7–4
Dobbie (Noble, Berg) – 26:11	8–4
	8–5	26:39 – McLaughlin (Williams, Gibson)
Leclaire (Dobbie) – 28:46	9–5
	9–6	35:21 – Gibson (McLaughlin) (PP)
	9–7	36:01 – Robinson (McIntyre, McLaughlin)
	9–8	38:11 – McLaughlin (Gibson, Williams)
	9–9	47:46 – Robinson (McLaughlin)
	9–10	48:50 – Cupido
	9–11	50:23 – McLaughlin (Robinson, Hope)
Berg (Dobbie, Staats) (PP) – 51:27	10–11
	10–12	51:34 – Chaster (Edwards)
	10–13	53:26 – Williams (McLaughlin, Robinson)
Dobbie (PS) – 55:23	11–13
Staats (Gobrecht) – 56:00	12–13
	12–14	57:00 – McLaughlin (Robinson)
	12–15	59:00 – McLaughlin (Robinson, Williams)
Berg (Leclaire, Holding) – 59:15	13–15

16 min
Penalties
8 min
55
Shots
49

Mammoth wins series 2–1.

=== NLL Final (best of three) ===
==== (E1) Buffalo Bandits vs. (W3) Colorado Mammoth ====
June 4, 2022	Buffalo Bandits	15–14 (4–1, 5–7, 3–3, 3–3)	Colorado Mammoth	KeyBank Center; Attendance: 14,274

Game reference

Matt Vinc
Goalies
Dillon Ward

	0–1	00:55 – McIntyre (Robinson, Wardle)
Byrne (Spanger) – 02:14	1–1
Smith (Byrne) (PP) – 07:29	2–1
Fields (Cloutier) – 14:11	3–1
Smith (Buchanan) – 14:16	4–1
Fraser (Byrne, Nanticoke) – 16:43	5–1
	5–2	17:27 – Robinson (Jeffrey, Ward)
	5–3	22:19 – Williams (McLaughlin, Robinson)
Nanticoke (Fraser, Fields) – 22:42	6–3
	6–4	23:08 – McLaughlin (Williams, Robinson)
Smith (Cloutier) – 23:50	7–4
Nanticoke (Brownwell, Brown) – 24:04	8–4
	8–5	24:45 – Williams (McLaughlin)
	8–6	25:11 – McLaughlin (Gibson) (PP)
	8–7	25:41 – McIntyre (McLaughlin, Williams)
Nanticoke (Buchanan, Smith) – 26:49	9–7
	9–8	27:47 – Robinson (Williams, McIntyre)
Nanticoke (Byrne, Smith) – 34:30	10–8
Nanticoke (Smith, MacKay) – 35:30	11–8
	11–9	41:12 – McLaughlin (Robinson, Williams)
Byrne (Buchanan, MacKay) – 41:34	12–9
	12–10	42:01 – McIntyre (Kinnear, Wardle)
	12–11	43:07 – Wardle (Gibson, Robinson)
	12–12	47:19 – Robinson (McLaughlin)
Cloutier (Fields, Byrne) – 50:57	13–12
	13–13	53:23 – Williams (Robinson, McLaughlin)
Byrne (Nanticoke, Smith) – 56:34	14–13
	14–14	58:03 – Williams (McIntyre, Wardle)
Weiss (MacKay) – 59:09	15–14

4 min
Penalties
6 min
55
Shots
54

June 11, 2022	Colorado Mammoth	11–8 (1–0, 3–6, 2–1, 5–1)	Buffalo Bandits	Ball Arena; Attendance: 10,082

Game reference

Dillon Ward
Goalies
Matt Vinc

Williams (Kinnear, Wardle) – 02:47	1–0
Robinson (McIntyre, Gibson) – 16:18	2–0
	2–1	19:30 – Smith (Cloutier)
	2–2	23:00 – MacKay (Priolo)
	2–3	24:00 – Smith (Byrne, MacKay)
	2–4	24:26 – Byrne (Smith, Nanticoke)
	2–5	25:25 – Cloutier (Fields) (PP)
Williams (Wardle, McIntyre) – 27:08	3–5
	3–6	29:10 – Byrne (Fields, Brownwell)
Robinson (Williams, Gibson) – 29:58	4–6
Williams (Robinson, Carnegie) – 31:09	5–6
	5–7	31:28 – Cloutier (Nanticoke, Buchanan)
Robinson (Wardle, McIntyre) – 33:33	6–7
	6–8	45:46 – Buchanan (Byrne, MacKay)
McIntyre (Wardle, Sullivan) – 48:01	7–8
Williams (Kinnear, McIntyre) – 49:04	8–8
Kinnear (Gibson, Cupido) – 50:10	9–8
Gibson (Williams, Kinnear) – 52:47	10–8
McIntyre (Williams) – 53:41	11–8

6 min
Penalties
15 min
44
Shots
48

June 18, 2022	Buffalo Bandits	8–10 (3–2, 2–5, 1–0, 2–3)	Colorado Mammoth	KeyBank Center; Attendance: 19,060

Game reference

Matt Vinc
Goalies
Dillon Ward

	0–1	00:24 – Williams (Wardle, Hope)
Smith (Byrne, MacKay) – 01:15	1–1
Byrne (Buchanan, Fraser) – 01:34	2–1
MacKay (O'Connor) – 07:33	3–1
	3–2	10:01 – Williams (Robinson, Wardle)
	3–3	15:36 – McIntyre (Robinson, Wardle)
	3–4	15:49 – Firth (Kinnear, Wardle)
Buchanan (Byrne, Weiss) – 17:05	4–4
	4–5	18:20 – Kinnear (Wardle, Williams)
Buchanan (O'Connor, Vinc) – 22:25	5–5
	5–6	24:09 – Gibson (Williams, McIntyre)
	5–7	25:29 – Joaquim
Cloutier (Byrne, Smith) (PP) – 40:14	6–7
Fields (Smith, Priolo) – 45:27	7–7
	7–8	48:14 – Williams (Firth, Cupido)
	7–9	50:31 – Wardle (Joaquim, Hope)
	7–10	59:34 – Williams (Gilles, Hope) (ENG)
Buchanan (Nanticoke) – 59:53	8–10

6 min
Penalties
8 min
63
Shots
47

Mammoth wins series 2–1.

== Awards ==
=== Annual awards ===
Award	Winner	Other Finalists
Most Valuable Player	Dhane Smith, Buffalo Bandits	Joe Resetarits, Albany FireWolves; Matt Vinc, Buffalo Bandits
Goaltender of the Year	Matt Vinc, Buffalo Bandits	Nick Rose, Toronto Rock; Dillon Ward, Colorado Mammoth
Defensive Player of the Year	Mitch de Snoo, Toronto Rock	Steve Priolo, Buffalo Bandits; Kyle Rubisch, Saskatchewan Rush
Transition Player of the Year	Zach Currier, Calgary Roughnecks	Reid Bowering, Vancouver Warriors; Challen Rogers, Toronto Rock
Rookie of the Year	Jeff Teat, New York Riptide	Reid Bowering, Vancouver Warriors; Patrick Dodds, Panther City Lacrosse Club
Sportsmanship Award	Lyle Thompson, Georgia Swarm	Keegan Bal, Vancouver Warriors; Dan Dawson, Toronto Rock
GM of the Year	Steve Dietrich, Buffalo Bandits	Jamie Dawick, Toronto Rock; Bob Hamley, Panther City Lacrosse Club
Les Bartley Award	Tracey Kelusky, Panther City Lacrosse Club	Matt Sawyer, Toronto Rock; John Tavares, Buffalo Bandits
Executive of the Year Award	Jamie Dawick, Toronto Rock	Greg Bibb, Panther City Lacrosse Club; Rich Lisk, New York Riptide
Teammate of the Year Award	Jeremy Thompson, Panther City Lacrosse Club	Zach Currier, Calgary Roughnecks; Jeff Shattler, Saskatchewan Rush
Tom Borrelli Award	Pat Gregoire, Halifax Thunderbirds	Jake Elliott, Vancouver Warriors; Tyson Geick, Halifax Thunderbirds / Lacrosse Flash

== Stadiums and locations ==
Georgia Swarm	Albany FireWolves	New York Riptide	Philadelphia Wings
Gas South Arena	MVP Arena	Nassau Coliseum	Wells Fargo Center
Capacity: 11,355	Capacity: 14,236	Capacity: 13,917	Capacity: 19,543

Buffalo Bandits	Halifax Thunderbirds	Rochester Knighthawks	Toronto Rock
KeyBank Center	Scotiabank Centre	Blue Cross Arena	First Ontario Centre
Capacity: 19,070	Capacity: 10,595	Capacity: 11,200	Capacity: 17,383

Calgary Roughnecks	Colorado Mammoth	San Diego Seals	Saskatchewan Rush	Vancouver Warriors
Scotiabank Saddledome	Ball Arena	Pechanga Arena	Co-op Field at SaskTel Centre	Rogers Arena
Capacity: 19,289	Capacity: 18,007	Capacity: 12,920	Capacity: 15,190	Capacity: 18,910

== Attendance ==
=== Regular season ===
Home team	Home games (Note: Only games open to the public are included)	Average attendance	Total attendance
Buffalo Bandits	9	9,921	89,293
Calgary Roughnecks	9	9,282	83,539
Saskatchewan Rush	9	8,947	80,523
Colorado Mammoth	9	8,218	73,963
Georgia Swarm	9	8,099	72,889
Toronto Rock	6	8,071	48,424
Vancouver Warriors	9	6,920	62,277
Philadelphia Wings	9	6,586	59,276
San Diego Seals	9	5,778	52,000
Albany FireWolves	9	5,524	49,713
Halifax Thunderbirds (Note: For three games, the Thunderbirds reported attendance totals rounded to the even thousand)	7	5,439	38,070
Panther City LC	9	4,995	44,951
New York Riptide	9	4,267	38,400
Rochester Knighthawks	9	4,153	37,376
League	121	6,865	830,694

=== Playoffs ===
Home team	Home games	Average attendance	Total attendance
Buffalo Bandits	4	14,031	56,127
Colorado Mammoth	2	10,314	20,627
Toronto Rock	2	7,617	15,233
San Diego Seals	3	6,719	20,157
Calgary Roughnecks	1	6,000	6,000
League	12	9,845	118,144

== See also ==
- 2022 in sports
