= Kevin Brownell =

Canadian lacrosse player

Personal information
- Nationality: Canadian
- Born: August 16, 1988 (age 37) Millgrove Ontario
- Height: 6 ft 1 in (185 cm)
- Weight: 172 lb (78 kg; 12 st 4 lb)

Sport
- Position: Transition
- Shoots: Right
- NLL draft: 22nd overall, 2012; Buffalo Bandits
- NLL team Former teams: Ottawa Black Bears (2025-Present); New York Riptide (2023-2024); Buffalo Bandits (2013-2022)
- MSL team: Brooklin Redmen (2010-present)
- Pro career: 2013–

Kevin Brownell (born August 16, 1988) is a Canadian professional box lacrosse player for the Ottawa Black Bears of the National Lacrosse League and the Brooklin Redmen of Major Series Lacrosse. Hailing from Millgrove, Ontario, Brownell played collegiality at Robert Morris University, where he received all-Northeastern Conference first team honors. Brownell was drafted in the third round of the 2012 by the Bandits, beginning his rookie season on the practice roster, and working his way up to the active roster. He has played for the Brooklin Redmen since 2010, and has also played for the Burlington Chiefs of the Ontario Junior A Lacrosse League.

== Career Statistics ==
Kevin Brownell		Regular Season									Playoffs								
Season	Team	GP	G	A	Pts	LB	PIM	Pts/GP	LB/GP	PIM/GP	GP	G	A	Pts	LB	PIM	Pts/GP	LB/GP	PIM/GP
2013	Buffalo Bandits	7	2	6	8	19	0	1.14	2.71	0.00	–	–	–	–	–	–	–	–	–
2014	Buffalo Bandits	12	3	4	7	44	12	0.58	3.67	1.00	–	–	–	–	–	–	–	–	–
2015	Buffalo Bandits	18	6	13	19	79	11	1.06	4.39	0.61	1	0	0	0	2	0	0.00	2.00	0.00
2016	Buffalo Bandits	18	8	14	22	101	14	1.22	5.61	0.78	4	1	4	5	27	0	1.25	6.75	0.00
2017	Buffalo Bandits	18	4	12	16	92	10	0.89	5.11	0.56	–	–	–	–	–	–	–	–	–
2018	Buffalo Bandits	18	6	4	10	105	15	0.56	5.83	0.83	–	–	–	–	–	–	–	–	–
2019	Buffalo Bandits	17	3	11	14	74	4	0.82	4.35	0.24	4	1	1	2	22	0	0.50	5.50	0.00
2020	Buffalo Bandits	11	2	5	7	33	6	0.64	3.00	0.55	–	–	–	–	–	–	–	–	–
2022	Buffalo Bandits	16	2	13	15	86	6	0.94	5.38	0.38	6	0	5	5	26	0	0.83	4.33	0.00
2023	New York Riptide	18	7	6	13	84	6	0.72	4.67	0.33	–	–	–	–	–	–	–	–	–
2024	New York Riptide	17	4	4	8	83	4	0.47	4.88	0.24	–	–	–	–	–	–	–	–	–
		170	47	92	139	800	88	0.82	4.71	0.52	15	2	10	12	77	0	0.80	5.13	0.00
Career Total:		185	49	102	151	877	88	0.82	4.74	0.48									

GP–Games played; G–Goals; A–Assists; Pts–Points; LB–Loose balls; PIM–Penalty minutes; Pts/GP–Points per games played; LB/GP–Loose balls per games played; PIM/GP–Penalty minutes per games played.
