= Panther City Lacrosse Club =

Former professional box lacrosse team from Fort Worth, Texas

- Sport: Box lacrosse
- Founded: 2020
- Folded: 2024
- League: National Lacrosse League
- Conference: Western
- Based in: Fort Worth, TX
- Arena: Dickies Arena
- Colors: Purple, Black, White, Red
- Owner: Bill Cameron
- Head coach: Tracey Kelusky
- Playoff berths: 2 (2023, 2024)
- Website: panthercitylax.com

The Panther City Lacrosse Club were a professional box lacrosse team in the National Lacrosse League. They played at Dickies Arena in Fort Worth, Texas from their inaugural 2021–2022 season until ceasing operations in 2024.

== History ==
On July 22, 2020, the NLL awarded an expansion franchise to the city of Fort Worth and owner Bill Cameron. It was announced that the team would begin play in the 2021–2022 season, with its home arena being Dickies Arena.

At a press conference on November 17, 2020, the franchise officially became the Panther City Lacrosse Club. The team's unique name is in reference to Fort Worth's "Panther City" nickname, which stems from an 1875 article in the Dallas Herald that derisively characterized the city's economy as being so slow that a panther could sleep in the street by the courthouse. Although an intended insult, the name Panther City was enthusiastically embraced by locals after Fort Worth recovered economically. The team is also the league's first and only member to use the "Lacrosse Club" moniker, similar to how teams in the Premier Lacrosse League were named at the time.

On January 25, 2021, former Philadelphia Wings assistant Tracey Kelusky was named the team's first head coach.

=== Inaugural season ===
Panther City debuted on December 4, 2021, against the Wings in Philadelphia. Travis Cornwall scored the first goal in franchise history as Panther City took a 1–0 lead. Despite leading 7–4 at halftime, the team could not start 1–0 as they fell to the Wings, 12–11 in overtime. A week later on December 10, the franchise played its first ever home game at Dickies Arena, where they fell to the Vancouver Warriors, 14–8 in front of 7,309 fans. After five games, Panther City got their first franchise win on January 15, 2022, on Long Island against the New York Riptide, 13–12 thanks to an overtime goal from rookie forward Patrick Dodds. It took a month and a half and four more tries, but Panther City notched their second win and first ever home win on February 26, 11–10, in a rematch with the Warriors in front of 4,714 fans. Again it would be Patrick Dodds providing late-game heroics with a goal with 39 seconds remaining. The next week, Panther City collected a consecutive win for the first time, and set a franchise record for goals scored with a 17–16 home overtime win over the Saskatchewan Rush.

The streak would eventually climb to five games, catapulting the team back to the playoff race with a 6–8 record. Panther City would hang in there until the penultimate week of the regular season when they lost to the Georgia Swarm. A home loss to Saskatchewan closed out the year, though Panther City still posted the best inaugural season record by an expansion team since the San Diego Seals in 2018–19.

=== Cessation of operations ===
On August 30, 2024, the NLL announced that Panther City would cease operations effective immediately.

== Season-by-season record ==
Season	Conference	W	L	%	Finish	Home	Away	GF	GA	Coach	Playoffs
2022	Western	7	11	.389	5th	3–6	4–5	190	223	Tracey Kelusky	Did not qualify
2023	Western	10	8	.556	3rd	6–3	4–5	204	193	Tracey Kelusky	Lost Western Conference Semi-Final
2024	Unified	9	9	.500	7th	5–4	4–5	205	202	Tracey Kelusky	Lost Quarterfinals
Total	3 Seasons	26	28	.481		14–13	12–15	599	618	1 Head Coach	0 Championships
Playoff Totals	2 Appearances	0	2	.000		0–0	0–2	17	21	1 Head Coach	0 Championships

== Playoff results ==
Season	Game	Visiting	Home
2023	Western Conference Semi-Final	Panther City 9	Calgary 12
2024	Quarterfinals	Panther City 8	San Diego 9 OT

== Awards and honors ==
Year	Player	Award
2022	Tracey Kelusky	Les Bartley Award
2022	Jeremy Thompson	Teammate of the Year Award
2023	Jonathan Donville	Rookie of the Year

== Draft history ==
=== NLL Entry Draft ===
First Round Selections

- 2021: Jonathan Donville (1st overall), Nathan Grenon (11th overall)
- 2022: Jason Knox (5th overall), Mathieu Gautier (9th overall), Colton Lidstone (21st overall)
- 2023: None
