= New York Riptide =

NLL professional box lacrosse team

- Sport: Box lacrosse
- Founded: 2018
- Disbanded: 2024
- League: National Lacrosse League
- Location: Uniondale, New York
- Arena: Nassau Coliseum
- Colors: Navy, Teal, Orange
- Owner: GF Sports
- Head coach: Dan Ladouceur
- General manager: Rich Lisk
- Website: newyorkriptide.com

The New York Riptide were a professional box lacrosse franchise based in Uniondale, New York. They were members of the Eastern Conference of the National Lacrosse League (NLL) and played home games at Nassau Coliseum and began their first season in 2019.

2024 was the team's final season in Uniondale as the Riptide moved to Ottawa, with the team rebranding as the Ottawa Black Bears beginning with the 2024–2025 season.

== History ==
On December 12, 2018, the NLL awarded an expansion franchise to Uniondale, New York and owner GF Sports. The team began play in December 2019 with its home arena being the Nassau Coliseum. The Riptide mark the return of the National Lacrosse League to the Long Island area after the departure of the New York Saints (1989–2003) and the New York Titans (2006–2009), both of whom also played at Nassau Coliseum.

The New York Riptide name and logo were announced on February 17, 2019, as chosen by fans.

On January 18, 2020, the Riptide got their first win in franchise history when they beat the Georgia Swarm by a score of 13–12 in overtime at Nassau Coliseum.

On June 3, 2020, the entire coaching staff and lacrosse operations team, including head coach and general manager Regy Thorpe, were fired.

On July 10, 2020, the Riptide announced the hiring of Jim Veltman as general manager and Dan Ladouceur as head coach.

Veltman was relieved of his duties on January 9, 2023, and replaced by executive vice president Rich Lisk.

=== Relocation to Ottawa ===
On February 20, 2024, John Rodenburg of sports radio station CFGO reported that the Riptide would be relocating to Ottawa for the 2024–25 season, citing poor attendance. The next day, the NLL officially announced that the Riptide would relocate to Ottawa, and will be renamed the Ottawa Black Bears. The team will play its games at Canadian Tire Centre. It will mark the return of the NLL to Ottawa; the Ottawa Rebel (a relocation of the Syracuse Smash) relocated to Edmonton as the Edmonton Rush in 2003 (that team later moved to Saskatoon as the Saskatchewan Rush).

== Final roster ==
New York Riptide roster
Active (21-man) roster		Inactive roster	Coaches
Goaltenders: 31 (Canada) Will Johnston; 86 (Canada) Cameron Dunkerly; Defensemen: 11 (Canada) Callum Jones; 44 (Canada) Matt Marinier; 45 (Canada) Damon Edwards (C); 55 (Canada) Mitch Wilde; 58 (Canada) Andrew Borgatti; 75 (Canada) Jay Thorimbert	Forwards: 5 (Canada) Taggart Clark; 9 (Canada) Reilly O'Connor (A); 18 (Canada) Colton Lidstone; 28 (Canada) Stephen Keogh; 46 (Canada) Kyle Matiszi; 51 (Canada) Jeff Teat; 68 (United States) Larson Sundown; 92 (Canada) Connor Kearnan; Transition: 8 (Canada) Kevin Brownell (A); 10 (Canada) Zack Deaken; 15 (Canada) Brent Noseworthy; 33 (Canada) John LaFontaine; 88 (United States) Ron John	Practice squad: 1 (Canada) Kaleb Martin; 16 (Canada) Jacob Gasperetti; (Canada) Jack Kelly; Injured reserve: 19 (Canada) Mackenzie Mitchell; Holdout: 84 (United States) Dylan Molloy; 93 (Canada) Austin Madronic; (United States) JT Giles-Harris; (United States) Chris Gray; (United States) Petey LaSalla; Protected list: 43 (Canada) Corson Kealey; Unable to play: (Canada) Robert Morgan; (Canada) Justin Tkachuk	Head coach Dan Ladouceur Assistant coaches Jason Crosbie, Angus Dineley, Pat Jones Legend: * Suspended list; (C) Captain; (A) Alternate captain; NLL Transactions

== All-time record ==
Season	Division/Conference (Note: Conference play began in the 2022 season)	W–L	Finish	Home	Road	GF	GA	Coach	Playoffs
2020	Eastern	1–12	4th	1–5	0–7	116	177	Regy Thorpe	No Playoffs Held
2021	Eastern	Season cancelled due to COVID-19 pandemic							
2022	Eastern	6–12	7th	3–6	3–6	214	226	Dan Ladouceur	Did Not Qualify
2023	Eastern	5–13	7th	3–6	2–7	201	243	Dan Ladouceur	Did Not Qualify
2024	Unified	8–10	9th	4–5	4–5	206	234	Dan Ladouceur	Did Not Qualify
Total	4 Seasons	20–47		11–22	9–25	737	880	0 Championships	

== Award winners ==
Year	Player	Award
2020	Tyson Gibson	Rookie of the Year
2022	Jeff Teat	Rookie of the Year

== Coaching history ==
#	Name	Term	Regular season				Playoffs			
#	Name	Term	GC	W	L	W%	GC	W	L	W%
1	Regy Thorpe	2020	13	1	12	.077%	—	—	—	—
2	Dan Ladouceur	2022–2024	54	19	35	.312%	—	—	—	—

== Draft history ==
=== NLL Entry Draft ===
First Round Selections

- 2019: Tyson Gibson (1st overall), Tyson Bomberry (10th overall)
- 2020: Jeff Teat (1st overall)
- 2021: None
- 2022: Zack Deaken (8th overall)
- 2023: Callum Jones (3rd overall), Jake Stevens (10th overall)
