= Albany FireWolves =

NLL professional box lacrosse team in Albany, New York

- Sport: Box lacrosse
- First season: 2021
- Last season: 2025
- League: National Lacrosse League
- Team history: Philadelphia Wings (1987–2014); New England Black Wolves (2015–2020)
- Location: Albany, New York
- Arena: MVP Arena
- Colors: Maroon, Tan, White
- Head coach: Glenn Clark
- Playoff berths: 2 (2022, 2024)
- Formerly: New England Black Wolves
- Website: albanyfirewolves.com

The Albany FireWolves were an American professional box lacrosse team based in Albany, New York, that competed in the National Lacrosse League (NLL). The team began play in the 2021–22 season at MVP Arena. The team was owned by a group headed by former NLL player Oliver Marti.

== Team history ==
The team relocated from Uncasville, Connecticut, where they were known as the New England Black Wolves. The Black Wolves themselves were a relocation of the Philadelphia Wings. This is also the second National Lacrosse League franchise in Albany after the Albany Attack, who played from 2000 to 2003 before relocating to San Jose, where they were known as the San Jose Stealth.

The team was officially named the FireWolves on April 14, 2021, after an online naming contest was held. The final three names considered were Attack, FireWolves and Black Arrows. The team changed its original logo after hearing from Stony Brook University lawyers, who raised concerns about the original logo's similarity to the Stony Brook Seawolves logo.

On August 18, 2025, reports from local and national sports media surfaced that the FireWolves would relocate to Oshawa, Ontario prior to the start of the 2026 NLL season. The team declined to comment when inquired about the reports. However, the following day, on August 19, the NLL officially announced the FireWolves' relocation to Oshawa, where they will be known as the Oshawa FireWolves.

== Final roster ==
Albany FireWolves roster
Active (21-man) roster		Inactive roster	Coaches
Goaltenders: 29 (Canada) Andrew Kidd; 30 (Haudenosaunee) Doug Jamieson; Defensemen: 11 (Canada) Jackson Nishimura; 14 (Canada) Nicholas Volkov; 16 (Canada) Zac Masson; 22 (Canada) Nick Chaykowsky; 24 (Canada) Zachary Young; 27 (Canada) Mike Byrne; 37 (Canada) Ethan O'Connor; 77 (Canada) John Wagner; 91 (United States) Joe Nardella	Forwards: 2 (Canada) Tye Kurtz; 6 (Canada) Alex Simmons; 7 (Canada) Ben MacDonnell; 41 (United States) John Piatelli; 47 (Canada) Kyle Jackson; 51 (Canada) Dyson Williams; 57 (Canada) Ethan Walker; 94 (Canada) Sam Firth; Transition: 15 (Haudenosaunee) Blake Gibson-McDonald; 17 (Canada) Colton Watkinson; 19 (Canada) Patrick Kaschalk; 43 (Canada) Will Johansen	Practice squad: 20 (Canada) Jackson Raposo; 21 (Canada) Johnathan Peshko; 31 (Canada) Cameron Pilon; 45 (Canada) Carson Moyer	Head coach Glenn Clark Legend: * Suspended list; (C) Captain; (A) Alternate captain; updated 2025-03-28; NLL Transactions

== All-time record ==
Season	Conference	W–L	Finish	Home	Road	GF	GA	Coach	Playoffs
2022	Eastern	9–9	4th	5–4	4–5	188	193	Glenn Clark	Lost Conference Semi-finals
2023	Eastern	3–15	8th	0–9	3–6	167	233	Glenn Clark	Did Not Qualify
2024	Unified	11–7	4th	5–4	6–3	206	191	Glenn Clark	Lost Finals
2025	Unified	7–11	11th	5–4	2–7	192	209	Glenn Clark	Did Not Qualify
Total	4 Seasons	30–42		15–21	15–21	753	826		
Playoff Totals	2 appearances	3–2		2–1	1–1	62	56	0 Championships	

== Playoff results ==
Season	Game	Visiting	Home
2022	Eastern Conference Semi-finals	Albany 5	Buffalo 10
2024	Quarterfinals	Halifax 3	Albany 9
2024	Semi-finals Game 1	Albany 14	San Diego 12
2024	Semi-finals Game 2	San Diego 10	Albany 13
2024	Championship Game 1	Buffalo 12	Albany 8
2024	Championship Game 2	Albany 13	Buffalo 15

== Awards and honors ==
Year	Player	Award
2024	Alex Simmons	Rookie of the Year
2024	Glenn Clark	Les Bartley Award
2024	Glenn Clark	GM of the Year

== Draft history ==
The following lists Albany FireWolves first-round selections in the NLL Entry Draft.

Year	Player(s) selected
2021	Patrick Kaschalk (16th overall)
2022	Alex Simmons (4th overall), Will Johansen (7th overall), Tye Kurtz (17th overall)
2023	Dyson Williams (1st overall), Zach Young (17th overall)
2024	None
