= 2025 NLL season =

- League: National Lacrosse League
- Sport: Indoor lacrosse (box lacrosse)
- Duration: November 29, 2024 — May 24, 2025
- Games: 18
- Teams: 14
- TV partner(s): ESPN (United States); TSN (Canada)

Draft
- Top draft pick: Brennan O'Neill
- Picked by: Philadelphia Wings

Regular season
- Top seed: Buffalo Bandits
- Season MVP: Connor Fields (Rochester Knighthawks)
- Top scorer: Dhane Smith & Josh Byrne (Buffalo Bandits)

Playoffs
- Finals champions: Buffalo Bandits (7th title)
- Runners-up: Saskatchewan Rush
- Finals MVP: Ian MacKay (Bandits)

NLL seasons
- ← 2024 season 2026 season →

The 2025 NLL season was the 38th season of play of the National Lacrosse League (NLL). The season began on November 29, 2024, and ended on May 24, 2025, with the Buffalo Bandits defeating the Saskatchewan Rush, 2–1, in the NLL Finals to claim a record seventh league title.

== Team movement ==
On February 21, 2024, the NLL announced that the New York Riptide would relocate to Ottawa, and be renamed the Ottawa Black Bears for competition in the 2025 season.

On August 30, 2024, the NLL announced that the Panther City Lacrosse Club would cease operations. The league held a dispersal draft on September 2.

On April 12, 2024, the Las Vegas Desert Dogs announced they were moving their home arena from Michelob Ultra Arena to Lee's Family Forum.

== Teams ==
2025 National Lacrosse League
Team	City	Arena	Capacity
Albany FireWolves	Albany, New York	MVP Arena	14,236
Buffalo Bandits	Buffalo, New York	KeyBank Center	19,070
Calgary Roughnecks	Calgary, Alberta	Scotiabank Saddledome	19,289
Colorado Mammoth	Denver, Colorado	Ball Arena	18,000
Georgia Swarm	Duluth, Georgia	Gas South Arena	10,500
Halifax Thunderbirds	Halifax, Nova Scotia	Scotiabank Centre	10,595
Las Vegas Desert Dogs	Henderson, Nevada	Lee's Family Forum	5,567
Ottawa Black Bears	Ottawa, Ontario	Canadian Tire Centre	18,655
Philadelphia Wings	Philadelphia, Pennsylvania	Wells Fargo Center	19,306
Rochester Knighthawks	Rochester, New York	Blue Cross Arena	10,662
San Diego Seals	San Diego, California	Pechanga Arena	12,920
Saskatchewan Rush	Saskatoon, Saskatchewan	SaskTel Centre	15,195
Toronto Rock	Mississauga, Ontario	Paramount Fine Foods Centre	5,612
Vancouver Warriors	Vancouver, British Columbia	Rogers Arena	18,910

=== Map of teams ===
NLL Teams

== Regular season ==
P	Team	GP	W	L	PCT	GB	Home	Road	GF	GA	Diff	GF/GP	GA/GP
1	Buffalo Bandits – xz	18	13	5	.722	0.0	6–3	7–2	242	195	+47	13.44	10.83
2	Saskatchewan Rush – x	18	13	5	.722	0.0	6–3	7–2	213	179	+34	11.83	9.94
3	Halifax Thunderbirds – x	18	11	7	.611	2.0	6–3	5–4	239	213	+26	13.28	11.83
4	Vancouver Warriors – x	18	11	7	.611	2.0	7–2	4–5	196	172	+24	10.89	9.56
5	Rochester Knighthawks – x	18	10	8	.556	3.0	4–5	6–3	228	209	+19	12.67	11.61
6	Calgary Roughnecks – x	18	10	8	.556	3.0	3–6	7–2	219	209	+10	12.17	11.61
7	Georgia Swarm – x	18	9	9	.500	4.0	4–5	5–4	214	217	−3	11.89	12.06
8	San Diego Seals – x	18	9	9	.500	4.0	6–3	3–6	215	209	+6	11.94	11.61
9	Ottawa Black Bears	18	8	10	.444	5.0	4–5	4–5	183	202	−19	10.17	11.22
10	Colorado Mammoth	18	8	10	.444	5.0	4–5	4–5	195	212	−17	10.83	11.78
11	Albany FireWolves	18	7	11	.389	6.0	5–4	2–7	192	209	−17	10.67	11.61
12	Philadelphia Wings	18	7	11	.389	6.0	4–5	3–6	207	231	−24	11.50	12.83
13	Toronto Rock	18	6	12	.333	7.0	2–7	4–5	189	208	−19	10.50	11.56
14	Las Vegas Desert Dogs	18	4	14	.222	9.0	2–7	2–7	189	256	−67	10.50	14.22

== Scoring leaders ==
Note: GP = Games played; G = Goals; A = Assists; Pts = Points; PIM = Penalty minutes; LB = Loose Balls

Player	Team	GP	G	A	Pts	PIM	LB
Dhane Smith	Buffalo Bandits	18	32	102	134	6	116
Josh Byrne	Buffalo Bandits	18	44	90	134	18	88
Joe Resetarits	Philadelphia Wings	18	41	81	122	2	66
Connor Fields	Rochester Knighthawks	18	46	76	122	12	148
Ryan Lanchbury	Rochester Knighthawks	18	27	89	116	8	80
Keegan Bal	Vancouver Warriors	18	43	69	112	18	68
Mitchell Jones	Philadelphia Wings	18	31	80	111	37	100
Jeff Teat	Ottawa Black Bears	18	56	55	111	2	107
Curtis Dickson	Calgary Roughnecks	18	48	60	108	6	73
Jesse King	Calgary Roughnecks	18	30	75	105	10	85

== Leading goaltenders ==
Note: GP = Games played; Mins = Minutes played; W = Wins; L = Losses: GA = Goals Allowed; SV% = Save Percentage; GAA = Goals against average

Player	Team	GP	Mins	W	L	GA	SV%	GAA
Frankie Scigliano	Saskatchewan Rush	16	957	11	4	150	0.795	9.40
Aden Walsh	Vancouver Warriors	16	703	5	6	150	0.788	9.40
Nick Rose	Toronto/Calgary	18	1048	7	10	183	0.820	10.47
Matt Vinc	Buffalo Bandits	18	1080	13	5	193	0.790	10.71
Rylan Hartley	Rochester Knighthawks	9	478	6	2	86	0.774	10.79

== Awards ==
=== Annual awards ===
Reference for nominees:

Award	Winner	Other Finalists
Most Valuable Player	Connor Fields, Rochester Knighthawks	Wesley Berg, San Diego Seals; Dhane Smith, Buffalo Bandits
Goaltender of the Year	Frankie Scigliano, Saskatchewan Rush	Nick Rose, Calgary Roughnecks; Matt Vinc, Buffalo Bandits
Defensive Player of the Year	Matt Hossack, Saskatchewan Rush	Ryan Dilks, Vancouver Warriors; Graeme Hossack, Halifax Thunderbirds
Transition Player of the Year	Owen Grant, Vancouver Warriors	Zach Currier, San Diego Seals; Ryan Terefenko, Halifax Thunderbirds
Offensive Player of the Year	Dhane Smith, Buffalo Bandits	Connor Fields, Rochester Knighthawks; Jeff Teat, Ottawa Black Bears
Rookie of the Year	Dyson Williams, Albany FireWolves	Brennan O'Neill, Philadelphia Wings; Adam Poitras, Las Vegas Desert Dogs
Sportsmanship Award	Kyle Buchanan, Buffalo Bandits	Keegan Bal, Vancouver Warriors; Lyle Thompson, Georgia Swarm
GM of the Year	Derek Keenan, Saskatchewan Rush	Mike Board, Calgary Roughnecks; Curt Malawsky, Vancouver Warriors
Les Bartley Award	Jimmy Quinlan, Saskatchewan Rush	Mike Hasen, Rochester Knighthawks; Curt Malawsky, Vancouver Warriors
Executive of the Year Award	Jason Thorne, Vancouver Warriors	John Catalano, Halifax Thunderbirds; Scott Loffler, Buffalo Bandits
Teammate of the Year Award	Keegan Bell, Saskatchewan Rush	Each team nominated one candidate for the award
Tom Borrelli Award	John Gurtler, Buffalo Bandits	Maki Jenner, Halifax Thunderbirds, TSN; Teddy Jenner, "Off the Crossebar" podcast, TSN

== Playoffs ==
Quarterfinal
1	Buffalo	5
8	San Diego	4
4	Vancouver	15
5	Rochester	10
2	Saskatchewan	13
7	Georgia	9
3	Halifax	16
6	Calgary	12

Semifinal (best of 3)
1	Buffalo	2
4	Vancouver	0
2	Saskatchewan	2
3	Halifax	0

NLL Final (best of 3)
1	Buffalo	2
2	Saskatchewan	1

*Overtime

=== Quarterfinals ===
==== (1) Buffalo Bandits vs. (8) San Diego Seals ====
April 25, 2025	Buffalo Bandits	5–4 (1–0, 4–2, 0–1, 0–1)	San Diego Seals	KeyBank Center; Attendance: 17,703

Game reference

Matt Vinc
Goalies
Christopher Origlieri

MacKay – 05:24	1–0
	1–1	17:11 – Currier (Leclaire, McIntosh)
	1–2	17:49 – Berg (McIntosh, Hellyer)
Smith (Buchanan) – 21:03	2–2
MacKay (Byrne, Smith) – 26:08	3–2
Weiss (Vinc) – 28:47	4–2
Buchanan (Smith, Byrne) – 29:59	5–2
	5–3	40:01 – Leclaire (McIntosh, Gamble)
	5–4	59:59 – Currier (Hellyer, Leclaire) (PP)

13 min
Penalties
8 min
44
Shots
52

* Note: With both teams only combining for a total of nine goals, this was the lowest scoring game in NLL Playoff history.

==== (2) Saskatchewan Rush vs. (7) Georgia Swarm ====
April 26, 2025	Saskatchewan Rush	13–9 (4–2, 2–1, 2–3, 5–3)	Georgia Swarm	SaskTel Centre; Attendance: 5,434

Game reference

Frankie Scigliano
Goalies
Brett Dobson

	0–1	01:02 – Hickey (Cupido)
	0–2	06:41 – Bomberry (L. Thompson)
Shanks (Walter, Church) – 10:17	1–2
Boudreau (Hossack) – 11:27	2–2
Manns (Keenan, Haley) – 11:48	3–2
Keenan (Church, Haley) – 13:53	4–2
	4–3	20:21 – Bomberry (MacIntosh, Kew)
Walter (Manns, Shanks) – 21:52	5–3
Messenger (Hossack) – 29:10	6–3
	6–4	30:36 – L. Thompson (Wiedemann, Dobson)
	6–5	31:21 – Cole (L. Thompson, Bomberry) (PP)
Shanks (Hossack) (SH) – 31:41	7–5
	7–6	34:54 – MacIntosh (Wiedemann)
Walter – 44:22	8–6
Keenan (Shanks, Church) (PP) – 46:25	9–6
Boudreau (PP) – 47:27	10–6
	10–7	47:58 – Jackson (Cole, MacIntosh)
	10–8	54:13 – MacIntosh (Ranagan)
Boudreau (ENG) – 58:47	11–8
	11–9	59:02 – Cole
Naso (ENG) – 59:13	12–9
Boudreau – 59:54	13–9

7 min
Penalties
12 min
60
Shots
48

==== (3) Halifax Thunderbirds vs. (6) Calgary Roughnecks ====
April 26, 2025	Halifax Thunderbirds	16–12 (3–0, 5–3, 3–4, 5–5)	Calgary Roughnecks	Scotiabank Centre; Attendance: 10,595

Game reference

Drew Hutchison
Goalies
Nick Rose
Cam MacLeod

Thompson – 01:33	1–0
Petterson (Hoggarth, Robinson) – 1:47	2–0
Hoggarth (Petterson, Jamieson) – 9:52	3–0
	3–1	20:36 – Mayea (King, C. Dickson)
Jamieson (Petterson, Hoggarth) – 23:49	4–1
	4–2	25:15 – Pace (Dobbie, Callies)
Theede (Staats) – 26:00	5–2
Theede (Robinson, Petterson) (SH) – 27:16	6–2
	6–3	29:07 – King (Callies, Rose)
Robinson (Hoggarth, Staats) – 29:45	7–3
Hoggarth (Staats, Theede) – 29:58	8–3
	8–4	31:03 – Dobbie (King, C. Dickson) (PP)
Jamieson (Withers) – 32:09	9–4
	9–5	34:16 – C. Dickson (Follows, Matsuoka)
	9–6	36:54 – King (Dobbie, C. Dickson)
Smyth (Armstrong) – 38:09	10–6
	10–7	38:59 – Pace (Cook, Dobbie)
Hoggarth (Staats, Robinson) – 43:08	11–7
Staats (Petterson, Theede) (PP) – 51:05	12–7
Staats (Robinson, Hoggarth) – 52:08	13–7
	13–8	55:15 – C. Dickson (Ticehurst)
Theede (Robinson, Petterson) (SH) – 56:13	14–8
Jamieson (Hoggarth, Staats) – 56:45	15–8
	15–9	57:40 – C. Dickson (Pace, H. Dickson)
	15–10	57:53 – Pace (Dobbie, C. Dickson)
Smyth (Bell) – 58:12	16–10
	16–11	58:32 – H. Dickson (King, Cook)
	16–12	59:21 – Pace (Dobbie, C. Dickson) (PP)

14 min
Penalties
8 min
58
Shots
50

==== (4) Vancouver Warriors vs. (5) Rochester Knighthawks ====
April 26, 2025	Vancouver Warriors	15–10 (4–1, 5–2, 2–2, 4–5)	Rochester Knighthawks	Rogers Arena; Attendance: 8,164

Game reference

Christian Del Bianco
Goalies
Ryan Hartley
Riley Hutchcraft

Klarich (Charalambides, Bal) – 02:08	1–0
	1–1	02:23 – McConvey (Lanchbury, Fields)
Bal (Charalambides, Martel) – 06:09	2–1
McIntosh (Bal, Charalambides) – 07:29	3–1
Dilks (Cornwall) – 13:01	4–1
Crowley (Bal, Bowering) – 17:11	5–1
Loewen (Bal, Crowley) – 17:41	6–1
	6–2	20:33 – Smith (Lanchbury)
	6–3	24:45 – Fields (Lanchbury)
Crowley (Bal, Charalambides) – 27:10	7–3
Bal (Charalambides, McIntosh) – 28:01	8–3
Cornwall (Grant) – 29:03	9–3
	9–4	31:15 – Waters (Lanchbury, Fields)
Grant (Del Bianco) (SH) – 33:51	10–4
Bal (Loewen, Crowley) – 37:33	11–4
	11–5	43:11 – Fields (Lanchbury, Smith)
	11–6	46:33 – McConvey (Fields, Smith)
	11–7	46:54 – Gillies (McConvey, Gilray)
	11–8	50:23 – Smith (Lanchbury)
Bal (Klarich) – 52:11	12–8
	12–9	53:13 – Smith (Lanchbury, Knight)
Martel (Bal, McIntosh) – 54:35	13–9
	13–10	57:23 – McConvey (Hogg, Fields)
Bal (Bowering, Del Bianco) (ENG) – 59:12	14–10
Bowering (Cornwall) (ENG) – 59:26	15–10

8 min
Penalties
4 min
47
Shots
57

=== Semifinals ===
==== (1) Buffalo Bandits vs. (4) Vancouver Warriors ====
May 2, 2025	Buffalo Bandits	9–3 (3–1, 4–1, 1–0, 1–1)	Vancouver Warriors	KeyBank Center; Attendance: 14,415

Game reference

Matt Vinc
Goalies
Christian Del Bianco
Aden Walsh

	0–1	03:04 – Crowley (Martel, Bal) (PP)
MacKay (John) – 05:14	1–1
Smith (Byrne, Vinc) (PP) – 07:48	2–1
Fraser (Byrne, Nanticoke) (PP) – 10:23	3–1
MacKay (Buchanan) (PP) – 22:49	4–1
MacKay (Robinson) – 24:10	5–1
Nanticoke (Priolo) – 24:58	6–1
	6–2	26:32 – McIntosh (Charalambides, Bal) (PP)
Byrne (Cloutier, Weiss) – 27:11	7–2
MacKay (Byrne, Smith) – 44:49	8–2
	8–3	47:36 – Bal (Crowley, Charalambides) (PP)
Smith (Byrne) (PP) – 52:52	9–3

10 min
Penalties
25 min
49
Shots
38

May 4, 2025	Vancouver Warriors	9–11 (2–2, 2–3, 4–2, 1–4)	Buffalo Bandits	Rogers Arena; Attendance: 9,176

Game reference

Christian Del Bianco
Goalies
Matt Vinc

	0–1	01:28 – Smith (Buchanan, MacKay) (PP)
	0–2	04:42 – MacKay (Weiss, Vinc)
Crowley (Bal, Klarich) – 09:24	1–2
Loewen (Charalambides) – 13:41	2–2
	2–3	16:44 – Fraser (Nanticoke, Byrne)
Charalambides (Bal, Schenato) – 19:43	3–3
	3–4	24:43 – MacKay (Fraser)
	3–5	25:48 – MacKay (Buchanan, Smith)
Bal (Charalambides, Crowley) – 29:43	4–5
Charalambides (Klarich) – 30:29	5–5
Klarich (Charalambides, Charbonneau) – 30:43	6–5
	6–6	31:33 – Nanticoke (Byrne, John)
Charalambides (Klarich, Bal) – 35:06	7–6
Bal (McIntosh, Charalambides) – 35:47	8–6
	8–7	39:57 – Cloutier (Smith, Byrne) (PP)
	8–8	45:39 – Smith (MacKay)
	8–9	48:03 – Fraser (Nanticoke, Cloutier)
	8–10	48:59 – Cloutier (Byrne, Buchanan)
Klarich (Martel, Suboch) – 49:32	9–10
	9 –11	54:15 – Fraser (Smith, MacKay)

8 min
Penalties
6 min
38
Shots
41

Bandits win series 2–0.

==== (2) Saskatchewan Rush vs. (3) Halifax Thunderbirds ====
May 3, 2025	Saskatchewan Rush	16–7 (6–3, 1–1, 5–1, 4–2)	Halifax Thunderbirds	Scotiabank Centre; Attendance: 10,595

Game reference

Frankie Scigliano
Thomas Kiazyk
Goalies
Drew Hutchinson
Warren Hill

	0–1	00:53 – Petterson (Staats)
Walter (Church, Triolo) – 01:19	1–1
Manns (Church) – 03:50	2–1
Church (Keenan) – 09:56	3–1
Shanks (Keenan) – 10:56	4–1
Shanks (Haley, Manns) – 12:08	5–1
	5–2	13:10 – Staats (Petterson, Robinson)
	5–3	14:12 – Theede (Staats, Jamieson)
Shanks (Manns, Walter) – 14:38	6–3
	6–4	16:14 – Hoggarth (Staats, Robinson)
Hossack (Walter) – 29:00	7–4
Keenan (Manns) (PP) – 31:20	8–4
Shanks (Manns, Hossack) – 31:46	9–4
	9–5	38:22 – Terefenko (SH)
Shanks (Manns, Keenan) (PP) – 39:16	10–5
Shanks (Church, Manns) (PP) – 42:52	11–5
Messenger – 43:46	12–5
	12–6	49:28 – Hoggarth (Theede, Staats)
Church (Keenan, Manns) (PP) – 54:13	13–6
	13–7	56:55 – Theede (Petterson, Staats)
Manns (Hossack) (ENG) – 57:23	14–7
Haley (PS) – 58:53	15–7
Haley (PS) – 58:59	16–7

35 min
Penalties
71 min
51
Shots
48

May 10, 2025	Halifax Thunderbirds	9–10 OT (3–4, 1–1, 2–1, 3–3, 0–1)	Saskatchewan Rush	SaskTel Centre; Attendance: 5,829

Game reference

Warren Hill
Goalies
Frankie Scigliano
Thomas Kiazyk

	0–1	05:06 – Church (Manns, Barnable)
	0–2	10:11 – Manns (Shanks, Church) (PP)
	0–3	10:39 – Church (Shanks, Boudreau) (PP)
Theede (Petterson, Staats) – 11:11	1–3
	1–4	11:52 – Garlent (Boudreau)
Hoggarth (Staats, Theede) – 14:26	2–4
Staats (Robinson) – 14:58	3–4
Hoggarth (Theede) – 21:58	4–4
	4–5	23:06 – Keenan (Kid III, Hossack)
Petterson (Jamieson) (PP) – 32:37	5–5
	5–6	33:23 – Messenger
Petterson (Theede, BowHunter) – 44:56	6–6
Theede (Robinson, Kirst) – 56:37	7–6
	7–7	57:03 – Shanks (Keenan, Walter)
Hoggarth (Robinson, Petterson) – 57:27	8–7
Hoggarth (Theede, Robinson) – 58:24	9–7
	9–8	59:16 – Manns (Church)
	9–9	59:54 – Hossack (Barnable)
	9–10	61:40 – Shanks (Church, Manns) (PP)

26 min
Penalties
6 min
54
Shots
55

Rush win series 2–0

=== NLL Final (best of three) ===
==== (1) Buffalo Bandits vs. (2) Saskatchewan Rush ====
May 16, 2025	Buffalo Bandits	12–10 (2–3, 4–3, 5–4, 1–0)	Saskatchewan Rush	KeyBank Center; Attendance: 16,761

Game reference

Matt Vinc
Goalies
Frankie Scigliano

	0–1	00:22 – Walter (Church)
	0–2	02:04 – Anderson (Haley, Shanks)
Byrne (Fraser, Whitty) – 05:09	1–2
Buchanan (Nanticoke, Smith) – 05:47	2–2
	2–3	11:12 – Shanks (Anderson)
	2–4	15:41 – Haley (Manns, Walter)
MacKay (Smith, Buchanan) – 21:22	3–4
MacKay (Smith, Weiss) – 22:52	4–4
Fraser (Byrne, Matisz) – 23:35	5–4
	5–5	27:32 – Messenger (Boudreau, Shanks)
	5–6	29:10 – Shanks (Boudreau, Garlent)
MacKay (Weiss) – 29:45	6–6
	6–7	30:28 – Manns (Walter, Shanks)
	6–8	31:33 – Manns (Shanks, Church)
MacKay (Smith, Cloutier) (PP) – 33:16	7–8
	7–9	33:55 – Keenan (Shanks)
Smith (Cloutier, Nanticoke) – 36:06	8–9
	8–10	38:17 – Shanks (Manns, Church)
Smith (MacKay, Byrne) – 38:48	9–10
Buchanan (Byrne, MacKay) – 40:08	10–10
Smith (Nanticoke, Byrne) – 41:36	11–10
Buchanan (Smith) (ENG) – 59:48	12–10

8 min
Penalties
6 min
44
Shots
54

May 18, 2025	Saskatchewan Rush	11–10 (3–1, 3–5, 2–3, 3–1)	Buffalo Bandits	SaskTel Centre; Attendance: 8,216

Game reference

Frankie Scigliano
Goalies
Matt Vinc

Boudreau – 01:07	1–0
Shanks (Church, Garlent) – 04:01	2–0
Keenan (Manns, Church) – 09:08	3–0
	3–1	11:20 – Smith (Buchanan, Matisz)
	3–2	18:49 – MacKay (Byrne, Wyers)
	3–3	19:34 – Smith (Scanlan, MacKay)
Keenan (Shanks, Manns) (PP) – 21:07	4–3
Manns (Church, Shanks) – 22:49	5–3
	5–4	23:57 – Scanlan (Byrne, Smith)
	5–5	25:44 – MacKay (Matisz, Robinson)
	5–6	28:04 – Scanlan (Nanticoke, Smith)
Boudreau (Hossack) – 29:59	6–6
	6–7	34:11 – Fraser (Byrne, Nanticoke)
Haley (Shanks) – 39:38	7–7
	7–8	41:10 – Byrne (Nanticoke, Fraser)
Walter (Shanks, Church) – 43:55	8–8
	8–9	44:28 – Fraser (Buchanan)
Manns (Shanks, Haley) (PP) – 51:06	9–9
Shanks (Manns) – 52:44	10–9
Shanks (Manns, Keenan) – 56:52	11–9
	11–10	58:55 – Buchanan (Smith)

4 min
Penalties
8 min
52
Shots
50

May 24, 2025	Buffalo Bandits	15–6 (3–3, 4–3, 6–0, 2–0)	Saskatchewan Rush	KeyBank Center; Attendance: 19,070

Game reference

Matt Vinc
Goalies
Frankie Scigliano
Thomas Kiazyk

	0–1	00:24 – Shanks (Manns, Church)
Byrne (Smith, Vinc) – 03:06	1–1
	1–2	03:23 – Shanks (Church, Hossack) (PP)
Smith (Byrne) – 03:52	2–2
	2–3	06:48 – Manns (Church, Hossack)
Cloutier (Byrne) – 11:24	3–3
Byrne (Buchanan, Weiss) – 16:30	4–3
MacKay (Robinson, Wyers) – 17:38	5–3
Byrne (Buchanan, Matisz) – 17:56	6–3
Buchanan (Byrne, MacKay) – 19:14	7–3
	7–4	19:27 – Church (Keenan, Messenger)
	7–5	22:47 – Church (Keenan)
	7–6	25:42 – Church (Boudreau)
Fraser (Smith, Byrne) – 31:34	8–6
Byrne (MacKay, Smith) – 32:37	9–6
Smith (Cloutier, Byrne) – 38:32	10–6
Cloutier (Nanticoke, Smith) – 40:35	11–6
Smith (Nanticoke) – 41:29	12–6
Cloutier (Smith) – 42:55	13–6
Buchanan (Fraser, Weiss) – 54:42	14–6
Wyers (Weiss) – 56:41	15–6

8 min
Penalties
2 min
53
Shots
48

Bandits win series 2–1.

== Stadiums and locations ==
Georgia Swarm	Albany FireWolves	Ottawa Black Bears	Philadelphia Wings
Gas South Arena	MVP Arena	Canadian Tire Centre	Wells Fargo Center
Capacity: 11,355	Capacity: 14,236	Capacity: 18,655	Capacity: 19,543

Buffalo Bandits	Halifax Thunderbirds	Rochester Knighthawks	Toronto Rock
KeyBank Center	Scotiabank Centre	Blue Cross Arena	Paramount Fine Foods Centre
Capacity: 19,070	Capacity: 10,595	Capacity: 11,200	Capacity: 5,612

Calgary Roughnecks	Colorado Mammoth	San Diego Seals	Saskatchewan Rush
WestJet Field at Scotiabank Saddledome	Ball Arena	Pechanga Arena	Co-op Field at SaskTel Centre
Capacity: 19,289	Capacity: 18,007	Capacity: 12,920	Capacity: 15,190

Vancouver Warriors	Las Vegas Desert Dogs
Rogers Arena	Lee's Family Forum
Capacity: 18,910	Capacity: 5,567

== Attendance ==
=== Regular season ===
Home team	Home games	Average attendance	Total attendance
Buffalo Bandits	9	18,471	166,238
Calgary Roughnecks	9	12,086	108,777
Colorado Mammoth	9	9,874	88,870
Halifax Thunderbirds	9	9,789	88,101
Vancouver Warriors	9	9,677	87,091
Philadelphia Wings	9	6,829	61,465
Saskatchewan Rush	9	6,572	59,145
Rochester Knighthawks	9	6,138	49,101
Ottawa Black Bears	9	5,434	48,909
Toronto Rock	9	5,124	46,113
San Diego Seals (Note: For one game, the Seals reported an attendance total rounded to the even thousand)	9	5,229	47,063
Georgia Swarm	9	5,063	45,574
Las Vegas Desert Dogs	9	5,057	45,513
Albany FireWolves	9	5,013	45,120
League	126	7,834	987,080

=== Playoffs ===
Home team	Home games	Average attendance	Total attendance
Buffalo Bandits	4	16,987	67,949
Halifax Thunderbirds	2	10,595	21,190
Vancouver Warriors	2	8,670	17,340
Saskatchewan Rush	3	6,493	19,479
League	11	11,451	125,958

== See also ==
- 2025 in sports
