= 2024 NLL season =

- League: National Lacrosse League
- Sport: Indoor lacrosse (box lacrosse)
- Duration: December 1, 2023 — May 18, 2024
- Games: 18
- Teams: 15
- TV partner(s): ESPN (United States); TSN (Canada)

Draft
- Top draft pick: Dyson Williams
- Picked by: Albany FireWolves

Regular season
- Top seed: Toronto Rock
- Season MVP: Josh Byrne (Buffalo Bandits)
- Top scorer: Josh Byrne (Buffalo Bandits)

Playoffs
- Finals champions: Buffalo Bandits (6th title)
- Runners-up: Albany FireWolves
- Finals MVP: Josh Byrne (Bandits)

NLL seasons
- ← 2023 season 2025 season →

The 2024 NLL season was the 37th season of play of the National Lacrosse League (NLL). The season began on December 1, 2023, and ended on May 18, 2024, with the Buffalo Bandits sweeping the Albany FireWolves 2–0 in the NLL Finals series to claim their sixth league title.

During the season, on 29 December 2023, Canadian referee Carmen Massel became the first woman to be part of the officiating crew in a game in the NLL. She was the shot clock operator for the San Diego Seals vs. Rochester Knighthawks game in San Diego.

== League business ==
=== NLL Unboxed ===
On November 16, 2023, the NLL announced "NLL Unboxed", a new initiative to promote lacrosse among youth via branded "lacrosse communities" in strategic markets that do not currently have NLL teams. As part of the initiative, the NLL hosted a regular season game known as the NLL Unboxed Series in Laval, Quebec (a suburb of Unboxed market Montreal, which previously had an NLL team in 2002 in the form of the Montreal Express) featuring the New York Riptide hosting the Toronto Rock at Place Bell.

=== Team relocation ===
On February 21, 2024, the NLL announced that the New York Riptide would relocate to Ottawa, and will be renamed the Ottawa Black Bears.

== Teams ==
2024 National Lacrosse League
Team	City	Arena	Capacity
Albany FireWolves	Albany, New York	MVP Arena	14,236
Buffalo Bandits	Buffalo, New York	KeyBank Center	19,070
Calgary Roughnecks	Calgary, Alberta	Scotiabank Saddledome	19,289
Colorado Mammoth	Denver, Colorado	Ball Arena	18,000
Georgia Swarm	Duluth, Georgia	Gas South Arena	10,500
Halifax Thunderbirds	Halifax, Nova Scotia	Scotiabank Centre	10,500
Las Vegas Desert Dogs	Paradise, Nevada	Michelob Ultra Arena	12,000
New York Riptide	Uniondale, New York	Nassau Veterans Memorial Coliseum	13,917
Panther City Lacrosse Club	Fort Worth, Texas	Dickies Arena	12,200
Philadelphia Wings	Philadelphia, Pennsylvania	Wells Fargo Center	19,306
Rochester Knighthawks	Rochester, New York	Blue Cross Arena	10,662
San Diego Seals	San Diego, California	Pechanga Arena	12,920
Saskatchewan Rush	Saskatoon, Saskatchewan	SaskTel Centre	15,195
Toronto Rock	Toronto, Ontario	Scotiabank Arena	18,800
Vancouver Warriors	Vancouver, British Columbia	Rogers Arena	18,910

=== Map of teams ===
NLL Teams

== Regular season ==
The 2024 season introduced a new regular season format; conferences were abolished, with all teams now playing within the same standings. Each team played each other at least once, and the schedule formula provided the opportunity for four "flex games" to showcase league rivalries and players. The top eight teams advanced to the playoffs.Reference:

P	Team	GP	W	L	PCT	GB	Home	Road	GF	GA	Diff	GF/GP	GA/GP
1	Toronto Rock – xz	18	15	3	.833	0.0	7–2	8–1	218	169	+49	12.11	9.39
2	San Diego Seals – x	18	13	5	.722	2.0	8–1	5–4	210	178	+32	11.67	9.89
3	Albany FireWolves – x	18	11	7	.611	4.0	5–4	6–3	206	191	+15	11.44	10.61
4	Buffalo Bandits – x	18	11	7	.611	4.0	6–3	5–4	237	212	+25	13.17	11.78
5	Georgia Swarm – x	18	10	8	.556	5.0	6–3	4–5	198	197	+1	11.00	10.94
6	Halifax Thunderbirds – x	18	10	8	.556	5.0	6–3	4–5	228	200	+28	12.67	11.11
7	Panther City Lacrosse Club – x	18	9	9	.500	6.0	5–4	4–5	205	202	+3	11.39	11.22
8	Rochester Knighthawks – x	18	8	10	.444	7.0	4–5	4–5	214	226	−12	11.89	12.56
9	New York Riptide	18	8	10	.444	7.0	4–5	4–5	206	234	−28	11.44	13.00
10	Saskatchewan Rush	18	8	10	.444	7.0	4–5	4–5	217	210	+7	12.06	11.67
11	Calgary Roughnecks	18	8	10	.444	7.0	6–3	2–7	198	194	+4	11.00	10.78
12	Vancouver Warriors	18	8	10	.444	7.0	5–4	3–6	202	211	−9	11.22	11.72
13	Philadelphia Wings	18	6	12	.333	9.0	1–8	5–4	198	233	−35	11.00	12.94
14	Las Vegas Desert Dogs	18	5	13	.278	10.0	2–7	3–6	176	223	−47	9.78	12.39
15	Colorado Mammoth	18	5	13	.278	10.0	4–5	1–8	193	226	−33	10.72	12.56

x = clinched playoff berth | z = clinched top overall record

== Scoring leaders ==
Note: GP = Games played; G = Goals; A = Assists; Pts = Points; PIM = Penalty minutes; LB = Loose Balls

Player	Team	GP	G	A	Pts	PIM	LB
Josh Byrne	Buffalo Bandits	18	53	82	135	14	75
Dhane Smith	Buffalo Bandits	18	33	101	134	8	119
Jeff Teat	New York Riptide	18	58	73	131	6	111
Connor Fields	Rochester Knighthawks	18	56	64	120	10	158
Mitchell Jones	Philadelphia Wings	18	36	75	111	0	110
Wesley Berg	San Diego Seals	18	41	67	108	18	96
Jesse King	Calgary Roughnecks	18	32	73	105	16	85
Keegan Bal	Vancouver Warriors	18	49	56	105	2	66
Will Malcom	Panther City Lacrosse Club	18	37	68	105	0	94
Clarke Petterson	Halifax Thunderbirds	18	40	64	104	10	91

== Leading goaltenders ==
Note: GP = Games played; Mins = Minutes played; W = Wins; L = Losses: GA = Goals Allowed; SV% = Save Percentage; GAA = Goals against average

Player	Team	GP	Mins	W	L	GA	SV%	GAA
Nick Rose	Toronto Rock	18	1078	15	2	165	0.811	9.18
Christopher Origlieri	San Diego Seals	18	1059	13	5	173	0.792	9.79
Doug Jamieson	Albany FireWolves	17	978	11	5	165	0.800	10.12
Christian Del Bianco	Calgary Roughnecks	18	1081	8	10	192	0.795	10.65
Warren Hill	Halifax Thunderbirds	18	1039	9	8	188	0.773	10.85

== Playoffs ==
Quarterfinal
1	Toronto	9
8	Rochester	6
4	Buffalo	10*
5	Georgia	9
2	San Diego	9*
7	Panther City	8
3	Albany	9
6	Halifax	3

Semifinal (best of 3)
1	Toronto	0
4	Buffalo	2
2	San Diego	0
3	Albany	2

NLL Final (best of 3)
4	Buffalo	2
3	Albany	0

*Overtime

=== Quarterfinal ===
==== (1) Toronto Rock vs. (8) Rochester Knighthawks ====
April 27, 2024	Toronto Rock	9–6 (5–1, 1–2, 2–0, 1–3)	Rochester Knighthawks	FirstOntario Centre; Attendance: 6,934

Game reference

Nick Rose
Goalies
Rylan Hartley
Riley Hutchcraft

Rogers (Schreiber, Weier) – 02:08	1–0
Rogers (Craig) – 02:19	2–0
Boushy (Martin, Jubenville) – 02:42	3–0
Small (Matthews, Rogers) – 03:46	4–0
	4–1	12:00 – Waters (Knight, Lanchbury)
Schreiber (Small, de Snoo) – 13:26	5–1
	5–2	21:58 – Smith (Fields) (PP)
	5–3	27:10 – Knight (Coates, Evans)
Schreiber (Matthews) (SH) – 29:39	6–3
Matthews (Rogers, Kri) – 34:53	7–3
Boushy (Matthews, Rogers) – 45:34	8–3
	8–4	47:23 – Fields (Rees)
Craig (Small, Boushy) – 52:25	9–4
	9–5	54:42 – Smith (Fields, Biles)
	9–6	57:39 – Smith (Fields, McConvey) (PP)

12 min
Penalties
16 min
50
Shots
57

==== (4) Buffalo Bandits vs. (5) Georgia Swarm ====
April 27, 2024	Buffalo Bandits	10–9 OT (1–2, 4–3, 3–1, 1–3, 1–0)	Georgia Swarm	KeyBank Center; Attendance: 17,865

Game reference

Matt Vinc
Goalies
Brett Dobson

	0–1	00:26 – Bomberry (Jackson, Kearnan)
MacKay (Martin) – 03:57	1–1
	1–2	04:20 – Kew (Jackson)
Weiss (MacKay) – 19:38	2–2
	2–3	20:27 – L. Thompson (Kew, Jackson)
Byrne (B. Robinson) – 23:53	3–3
Byrne (Smith, MacKay) – 25:49	4–3
	4–4	26:44 – Henrick
Byrne (Fraser, Smith) (PP) – 29:07	5–4
	5–5	29:31 – Bomberry (L.Thompson)
Byrne (Nanticoke) (PP) – 32:29	6–5
Nanticoke (Smith, Buchanan) (PP) – 35:42	7–5
Cloutier (Smtih, Byrne) (PP) – 37:43	8–5
	8–6	42:57 – Kew (L.Thompson) (PP)
	8–7	47:43 – Bomberry (Cole, Comizio)
	8–8	52:53 – Kew (Bomberry, L.Thompson) (PP)
	8–9	53:26 – L.Thompson (Jackson, Kew)
Buchanan (Smith) – 54:05	9–9
Byrne (Smith) – 64:01	10–9

6 min
Penalties
8 min
59
Shots
55

==== (2) San Diego Seals vs. (8) Panther City Lacrosse Club ====
April 27, 2024	San Diego Seals	9–8 OT (2–2, 4–4, 1–1, 1–1, 1–0)	Panther City Lacrosse Club	Pechanga Arena; Attendance: 4,804

Game reference

Christopher Origlieri
Goalies
Nick Damude

Dobbie (Berg, Leclaire) – 02:36	1–0
	1–1	06:35 – Crawford (Knox, T. Malcom)
Holding – 09:25	2–1
	2–2	10:11 – Sheridan (Gautier, T. Malcom)
Leclaire (Staats) – 15:28	3–2
	3–3	17:28 – Caputo (Patten, Damude)
Staats (Dobbie, Berg) – 17:41	4–3
	4–4	20:30 – Sheridan (W. Malcom, Gautier)
	4–5	21:11 – Foley (Crawford)
Staats (Berg) – 24:28	5–5
	5–6	27:03 – W. Malcom (Crawford, Hutchison)
Dobbie (Berg, Dickson) – 29:57	6–6
Staats (Logan) – 32:24	7–6
	7–7	38:10 – Gautier (W. Malcom, Crawford)
	7–8	48:39 – T. Malcom
Staats (Logan, Holding) – 49:35	8–8
Dobbie (Berg, Dickson) – 62:49	9–8

6 min
Penalties
4 min
63
Shots
45

==== (3) Albany FireWolves vs. (6) Halifax Thunderbirds ====
April 28, 2024	Albany FireWolves	9–3 (1–1, 3–0, 2–2, 3–0)	Halifax Thunderbirds	MVP Arena; Attendance: 3,278

Game reference

Doug Jamieson
Goalies
Warren Hill

Longboat (Firth, Kurtz) – 09:51	1–0
	1–1	12:56 – Petterson (Staats, Shanks) (PP)
Simmons – 17:31	2–1
Kurtz (Wagner) – 20:05	3–1
Nishimura (Stouros) – 20:49	4–1
	4–2	30:28 – Shanks (Benesch, Petterson)
Longboat (Firth, Kurtz) – 34:45	5–2
Walker (Simmons) – 41:06	6–2
	6–3	44:43 – Petterson (Staats, Jamieson)
Watkinson (Chaykowsky) (ENG) – 57:49	7–3
Wagner (Jamieson) (ENG) – 58:56	8–3
Wagner (Joaquim, Nishimura) – 59:17	9–3

12 min
Penalties
82 min
56
Shots
55

=== Semifinal (best of three) ===
==== (1) Toronto Rock vs. (4) Buffalo Bandits ====
May 3, 2024	Toronto Rock	4–12 (0–3, 0–2, 1–3, 3–4)	Buffalo Bandits	FirstOntario Centre; Attendance: 7,130

Game reference

Nick Rose
Troy Holowchuk
Goalies
Matt Vinc

	0–1	07:14 – MacKay
	0–2	08:16 – Fraser (D. Robinson, Priolo)
	0–3	13:44 – Byrne (MacKay, Weiss)
	0–4	19:37 – Cloutier (Weiss, MacKay)
	0–5	21:49 – Buchanan (Byrne)
	0–6	35:01 – Smith (Byrne, Buchanan)
Martin (Corbeil) (SH) – 39:04	1–6
	1–7	39:31 – B. Robinson (Smith, Cloutier) (PP)
	1–8	44:48 – B. Robinson (Nanticoke)
Schreiber (Martin, Hostrawser) – 47:09	2–8
	2–9	53:02 – Buchanan (Smith)
	2–10	53:47 – Buchanan (Vinc) (PP, ENG)
	2–11	54:15 – Fraser (Byrne, Farrell)
Small (Boushy, Matthews) – 54:40	3–11
Small (Rogers, Schreiber) (PP) – 57:56	4–11
	4–12	58:59 – Cloutier (Smith)

23 min
Penalties
39 min
58
Shots
50

May 5, 2024	Buffalo Bandits	10–8 (3–2, 0–4, 1–1, 6–1)	Toronto Rock	KeyBank Center; Attendance: 16,312

Game reference

Matt Vinc
Goalies
Nick Rose

Smith (Nanticoke) – 03:19	1–0
	1–1	07:48 – Boushy (Schreiber)
	1–2	08:17 – Craig (Matthews, Schreiber)
Nanticoke (Byrne, Smith) – 10:43	2–2
Buchanan (Smith, B. Robinson) (PP) – 12:48	3–2
	3–3	21:20 – Rogers (Matthews, Boushy) (PP)
	3–4	26:04 – Matthews (Rogers, Schreiber) (PP)
	3–5	27:39 – Schreiber (Small, Matthews) (PP)
	3–6	28:04 – Small (Schreiber, Boushy)
Smith (Nanticoke, Cloutier) – 33:17	4–6
	4–7	40:50 – Weier (Jubenville)
	4–8	46:32 – Matthews (Martin, Kri)
Fraser (Byrne, Bomberry) – 47:05	5–8
Nanticoke (Byrne, MacKay) – 48:01	6–8
Byrne (Buchanan, Smith) – 48:54	7–8
Fraser (Byrne, Smith) – 51:40	8–8
Fraser (Byrne, Priolo) – 54:21	9–8
Byrne (Priolo, Weiss) – 55:15	10–8

15 min
Penalties
10 min
46
Shots
58

Bandits win series 2–0.

==== (2) San Diego Seals vs. (3) Albany FireWolves ====
May 3, 2024	San Diego Seals	12–14 (2–3, 2–3, 2–5, 6–3)	Albany FireWolves	Pechanga Arena; Attendance: 5,001

Game reference

Christopher Origlieri
Goalies
Doug Jamieson

Dobbie (Berg) – 00:40	1–0
	1–1	06:15 – Simmons (Powless, Walker)
Dickson (Baptiste, Belgrave) – 06:49	2–1
	2–2	13:46 – Walker (Simmons)
	2–3	14:59 – Firth (Simmons, Kurtz)
	2–4	16:22 – Simmons (Wagner)
	2–5	17:35 – Walker (Kurtz, Simmons) (PP)
	2–6	19:32 – Kurtz (Powless, Simmons)
Dobbie (Staats, Berg) (PP) – 23:28	3–6
Berg (Bradley, Shoemay) – 29:26	4–6
Berg (Leclaire, Dickson) – 30:23	5–6
	5–7	30:46 – Simmons (Walker, Longboat)
	5–8	31:20 – Grenon (Kurtz, Firth)
Dickson (Berg, Dobbie) (PP) – 33:11	6–8
	6–9	36:25 – Simmons (Walker) (PP)
	6–10	39:32 – Simmons (Powless, Walker)
	6–11	43:39 – Grenon (Kurtz, Chaykowsky)
Staats (Gobrecht, LeClair) – 47:19	7–11
Berg (Dickson, Staats) – 48:16	8–11
	8–12	49:21 – Byrne (Wagner)
	8–13	54:06 – Powless (Walker, Simmons) (PP)
Leclaire (Staats) – 56:28	9–13
Dickson (Berg, Staats) (SH) – 56:53	10–13
Dickson (Gobrecht) – 58:11	11–13
Dobbie (Staats) – 58:53	12–13
	12–14	59:21 – Watkinson (Kaschalk) (ENG)

25 min
Penalties
18 min
39
Shots
52

May 5, 2024	Albany FireWolves	13–10 (3–2, 3–3, 4–2, 3–3)	San Diego Seals	MVP Arena; Attendance: 4,237

Game reference

Doug Jamieson
Justin Geddie
Goalies
Christopher Origlieri

	0–1	02:23 – Leclaire (Dickson, Gobrecht)
	0–2	02:53 – Staats (Dickson, Berg)
Simmons (Firth, Kurtz) – 07:55	1–2
Firth (Walker, Kurtz) (PP) – 11:06	2–2
Longboat (Simmons) – 13:33	3–2
	3–3	17:49 – Leclaire (Origlieri)
Kurtz (Walker) – 18:31	4–3
Walker (Kurtz, Simmons) (PP) – 21:04	5–3
Simmons (Kurtz, Walker) (PP) – 24:31	6–3
	6–4	28:10 – Dickson (Dobbie) (PP)
	6–5	29:36 – Staats (Dickson)
	6–6	32:27 – Dobbie (Berg)
Longboat (Simmons, Firth) – 33:11	7–6
Kurtz (SH) – 34:56	8–6
Longboat (Simmons, Kurtz) (PP) – 37:08	9–6
	9–7	42:19 – Dickson (Leclaire, Dobbie) (PP)
Simmons (Walker) (PP) – 44:20	10–7
Walker (Kurtz, Nishimura) – 46:06	11–7
	11–8	49:44 – Staats (Leclaire, Berg) (PP)
Kurtz – 52:43	12–8
	12–9	53:58 – Dobbie (Leclaire, Gobrecht)
	12–10	54:51 – Staats (Merrill, Origlieri)
Watkinson (Kaschalk) (ENG) – 58:05	13–10

14 min
Penalties
63 min
46
Shots
61

FireWolves win series 2–0.

=== NLL Final (best of three) ===
May 17, 2024	Albany FireWolves	8–12 (4–4, 2–1, 0–2, 2–5)	Buffalo Bandits	MVP Arena; Attendance: 5,032

Game reference

Doug Jamieson
Justin Geddie
Goalies
Matt Vinc

Kurtz (Simmons, Walker) – 00:35	1–0
	1–1	02:44 – Nanticoke (Byrne, Smith)
	1–2	05:26 – Byrne (Smith, Cloutier)
Walker (Simmons, Powless) – 07:13	2–2
Kurtz (Simmons, Kaschalk) – 10:09	3–2
	3–3	12:47 – Byrne (Smith, Cloutier) (PP)
	3–4	13:11 – Smith (Cloutier, Byrne) (PP)
Walker (Grenon, Simmons) – 14:39	4–4
	4–5	17:43 – Cloutier (Smith)
Longboat (Walker, Kurtz) – 23:44	5–5
Simmons (Kurtz, Walker) – 29:34	6–5
	6–6	34:33 – Cloutier (Smith, Nanticoke)
	6–7	41:57 – Fraser (Smith, Cloutier)
	6–8	45:37 – MacKay (Smith, Byrne)
Simmons (Walker) – 46:10	7–8
	7–9	52:04 – Buchanan (Smith)
	7–10	55:44 – Byrne (Smith, MacKay)
	7–11	57:26 – Smith (B. Robinson, Byrne)
	7–12	57:40 – D. Robinson (ENG)
Firth (Powless, Walker) – 58:58	8–12

8 min
Penalties
2 min
45
Shots
56

May 18, 2024	Buffalo Bandits	15–13 (4–3, 5–4, 5–1, 1–5)	Albany FireWolves	KeyBank Center; Attendance: 19,070

Game reference

Matt Vinc
Goalies
Doug Jamieson

Buchanan (Byrne, Weiss) (SH) – 01:58	1–0
	1–1	04:54 – Kaschalk (Chaykowsky, Nishimura)
Smith (Byrne, D. Robinson) – 07:56	2–1
B. Robinson (Byrne, Fraser) – 08:33	3–1
Nanticoke (Smith, Byrne) (PP) – 10:46	4–1
	4–2	11:05 – Simmons (Firth)
	4–3	14:57 – Firth (Kurtz, Walker) (PP)
Nanticoke (Fraser, Dawson – 15:53	5–3
Fraser (Priolo) – 19:14	6–3
Cloutier (Byrne, Smith) – 20:02	7–3
Fraser (Byrne, Nanticoke) – 20:32	8–3
	8–4	21:27 – Simmons (Longboat)
Cloutier (Smith, Byrne) – 22:12	9–4
	9–5	25:29 – Firth (Walker, Simmons)
	9–6	27:49 – Firth (Simmons, Grenon)
	9–7	29:59 – Longboat (Walker)
	9–8	32:32 – Longboat (Firth, Kurtz)
Smith (Byrne, MacKay) – 33:52	10–8
Fraser (Buchanan, Cloutier) – 35:30	11–8
Fraser (Cloutier, Smith) – 37:16	12–8
Byrne (Buchanan) – 38:53	13–8
Fraser (MacKay, Farrell) – 39:19	14–8
	14–9	46:03 – Firth (Simmons, Walker)
B. Robinson (Smith, Cloutier) (PP) – 47:55	15–9
	15–10	48:08 – Longboat (Grenon, Chaykowsky)
	15–11	49:59 – Simmons (Kurtz)
	15–12	57:21 – Kurtz (Powless)
	15–13	59:52 – Firth (Simmons, Walker)

14 min
Penalties
12 min
51
Shots
49

Bandits win series 2–0.

== Awards ==
=== Annual awards ===
Award	Winner	Other Finalists
Most Valuable Player	Josh Byrne, Buffalo Bandits	Dhane Smith, Buffalo Bandits; Nick Rose, Toronto Rock
Goaltender of the Year	Nick Rose, Toronto Rock	Doug Jamieson, Albany FireWolves; Chris Origlieri, San Diego Seals
Defensive Player of the Year	Ryan Dilks, Vancouver Warriors	Mitch de Snoo, Toronto Rock; Brad Kri, Toronto Rock
Transition Player of the Year	Jake Withers, Halifax Thunderbirds	Ian MacKay, Buffalo Bandits; Shane Simpson, Calgary Roughnecks
Offensive Player of the Year	Josh Byrne, Buffalo Bandits	Dhane Smith, Buffalo Bandits; Jeff Teat, New York Riptide
Rookie of the Year	Alex Simmons, Albany FireWolves	Owen Grant, Vancouver Warriors; Tye Kurtz, Albany FireWolves
Sportsmanship Award	Lyle Thompson, Georgia Swarm	Keegan Bal, Vancouver Warriors; Tom Schreiber, Toronto Rock
GM of the Year	Glenn Clark, Albany FireWolves	Jamie Dawick, Toronto Rock; Curt Malawsky, Vancouver Warriors
Les Bartley Award	Glenn Clark, Albany FireWolves	Curt Malawsky, Vancouver Warriors; Matt Sawyer, Toronto Rock
Executive of the Year Award	John Catalano, Halifax Thunderbirds	Mike Hancock, Toronto Rock; Oliver Marti, Albany FireWolves
Teammate of the Year Award	Zach Greer, Las Vegas Desert Dogs	not announced
Tom Borrelli Award	Adam Levi, NLL.com, NLLPA, Inside Lacrosse, "Lacrosse Matrix" podcast	Teddy Jenner, TSN, "Off the CrosseBar" podcast Graeme Perrow, NLL Chatter

== Stadiums and locations ==
Georgia Swarm	Albany FireWolves	New York Riptide	Philadelphia Wings
Gas South Arena	MVP Arena	Nassau Coliseum	Wells Fargo Center
Capacity: 11,355	Capacity: 14,236	Capacity: 13,917	Capacity: 19,543

Buffalo Bandits	Halifax Thunderbirds	Rochester Knighthawks	Toronto Rock
KeyBank Center	Scotiabank Centre	Blue Cross Arena	First Ontario Centre
Capacity: 19,070	Capacity: 10,595	Capacity: 11,200	Capacity: 17,383

Calgary Roughnecks	Colorado Mammoth	San Diego Seals	Saskatchewan Rush
WestJet Field at Scotiabank Saddledome	Ball Arena	Pechanga Arena	Co-op Field at SaskTel Centre
Capacity: 19,289	Capacity: 18,007	Capacity: 12,920	Capacity: 15,190

Vancouver Warriors	Las Vegas Desert Dogs	Panther City Lacrosse Club
Rogers Arena	Michelob Ultra Arena	Dickies Arena
Capacity: 18,910	Capacity: 12,000	Capacity: 12,200

=== Regular season ===
Home team	Home games	Average attendance	Total attendance
Buffalo Bandits	9	16,974	152,767
Calgary Roughnecks	9	11,713	105,417
Colorado Mammoth	9	10,380	93,416
Halifax Thunderbirds	9	9,165	82,484
Vancouver Warriors	9	8,874	79,867
Toronto Rock	9	8,636	77,727
Philadelphia Wings	9	8,364	75,276
Saskatchewan Rush	9	8,085	72,767
Las Vegas Desert Dogs	9	6,350	57,154
Georgia Swarm	9	6,231	56,079
Rochester Knighthawks	9	5,526	48,738
New York Riptide	9	4,891	44,021
San Diego Seals	9	4,667	42,002
Albany FireWolves	9	3,963	35,665
Panther City LC	9	2,704	24,332
League	135	7,768	1,047,712

=== Playoffs ===
Home team	Home Games	Average Attendance	Total Attendance
Buffalo Bandits	3	17,749	53,247
Toronto Rock	2	7,032	14,064
San Diego Seals	2	4,903	9,805
Albany FireWolves	3	2,930	8,790
League	10	8,591	85,906

== See also ==
- 2024 in sports
