= 2023 NLL season =

- League: National Lacrosse League
- Sport: Indoor lacrosse (box lacrosse)
- Duration: December 2, 2022 — June 3, 2023
- Games: 18
- Teams: 15
- TV partner(s): ESPN (United States); TSN (Canada)

Draft
- Top draft pick: Thomas McConvey
- Picked by: Rochester Knighthawks

Regular season
- Top seed: Buffalo Bandits
- Season MVP: Christian Del Bianco (Calgary Roughnecks)
- Top scorer: Jeff Teat (New York Riptide)

Playoffs
- Finals champions: Buffalo Bandits (5th Title)
- Runners-up: Colorado Mammoth
- Finals MVP: Dhane Smith (Bandits)

NLL seasons
- ← 2022 season 2024 season →

The 2023 National Lacrosse League season, formally known as the 2022–2023 season, was the 36th in the history of the NLL. The season began on December 2, 2022, and ended with the NLL final on June 3, 2023. This was the inaugural season for the expansion team Las Vegas Desert Dogs.

The preseason went from November 5 through November 26, 2022. It included games at Aʼnowaraʼko꞉wa Arena and Toronto Rock Athletic Centre. The regular season went from December 2, 2022, through April 20, 2023. This season had the most regular season games in NLL history with 135. The broadcasting partners are TSN in Canada and ESPN in the United States. TSN featured 20 games on TV with their NLL Game of the Week on TSN and show all the games online and their app. ESPN aired 10 games on TV and all games on ESPN+. Due to scheduling conflicts with ESPN's linear networks, Game 3 of the NLL Final was simulcast on WNLO in addition to being carried on ESPN+.

This was the first season for Commissioner Brett Frood, who was previously a NASCAR executive as president of the Stewart-Haas Racing team. Frood was a collegiate lacrosse player and was captain of the Brown University lacrosse team.

The 2023 NLL Stadium Showdown, the first outdoor NLL game, was held on March 4 at Snapdragon Stadium, between the San Diego Seals and the Las Vegas Desert Dogs.

== Teams ==
2023 National Lacrosse League
Division	Team	City	Arena	Capacity
East	Albany FireWolves	Albany, New York	MVP Arena	14,236
East	Buffalo Bandits	Buffalo, New York	KeyBank Center	19,070
East	Georgia Swarm	Duluth, Georgia	Gas South Arena	10,500
East	Halifax Thunderbirds	Halifax, Nova Scotia	Scotiabank Centre	10,500
East	New York Riptide	Uniondale, New York	Nassau Veterans Memorial Coliseum	13,917
East	Philadelphia Wings	Philadelphia, Pennsylvania	Wells Fargo Center	19,306
East	Rochester Knighthawks	Rochester, New York	Blue Cross Arena	10,662
East	Toronto Rock	Toronto, Ontario	Scotiabank Arena	18,800
West	Calgary Roughnecks	Calgary, Alberta	Scotiabank Saddledome	19,289
West	Colorado Mammoth	Denver, Colorado	Ball Arena	18,000
West	Las Vegas Desert Dogs	Paradise, Nevada	Michelob Ultra Arena	12,000
West	Panther City Lacrosse Club	Fort Worth, Texas	Dickies Arena	12,200
West	San Diego Seals	San Diego, California	Pechanga Arena	12,920
West	Saskatchewan Rush	Saskatoon, Saskatchewan	SaskTel Centre	15,195
West	Vancouver Warriors	Vancouver, British Columbia	Rogers Arena	18,910

=== Map of teams ===
East Division West Division

== Regular season ==
East Conference
P	Team	GP	W	L	PCT	GB	Home	Road	GF	GA	Diff	GF/GP	GA/GP
1	Buffalo Bandits – xyz	18	14	4	.778	0.0	7–2	7–2	215	191	+24	11.94	10.61
2	Toronto Rock – x	18	13	5	.722	1.0	8–1	5–4	234	164	+70	13.00	9.11
3	Halifax Thunderbirds – x	18	10	8	.556	4.0	5–4	5–4	238	210	+28	13.22	11.67
4	Rochester Knighthawks – x	18	10	8	.556	4.0	6–3	4–5	218	214	+4	12.11	11.89
5	Philadelphia Wings	18	9	9	.500	5.0	4–5	5–4	200	211	−11	11.11	11.72
6	Georgia Swarm	18	8	10	.444	6.0	3–6	5–4	219	207	+12	12.17	11.50
7	New York Riptide	18	5	13	.278	9.0	3–6	2–7	201	243	−42	11.17	13.50
8	Albany FireWolves	18	3	15	.167	11.0	0–9	3–6	167	233	−66	9.28	12.94

West Conference
P	Team	GP	W	L	PCT	GB	Home	Road	GF	GA	Diff	GF/GP	GA/GP
1	San Diego Seals – xy	18	14	4	.778	0.0	7–2	7–2	240	193	+47	13.33	10.72
2	Calgary Roughnecks – x	18	13	5	.722	1.0	7–2	6–3	218	167	+51	12.11	9.28
3	Panther City Lacrosse Club – x	18	10	8	.556	4.0	6–3	4–5	204	193	+11	11.33	10.72
4	Colorado Mammoth – x	18	9	9	.500	5.0	7–2	2–7	190	208	−18	10.56	11.56
5	Saskatchewan Rush	18	8	10	.444	6.0	5–4	3–6	204	212	−8	11.33	11.78
6	Las Vegas Desert Dogs	18	5	13	.278	9.0	4–5	1–8	179	222	−43	9.94	12.33
7	Vancouver Warriors	18	4	14	.222	10.0	2–7	2–7	188	247	−59	10.44	13.72

== Scoring leaders ==
Note: GP = Games played; G = Goals; A = Assists; Pts = Points; PIM = Penalty minutes; LB = Loose Balls

Player	Team	GP	G	A	Pts	PIM	LB
Jeff Teat	New York Riptide	18	56	80	136	2	105
Dhane Smith	Buffalo Bandits	18	36	96	132	6	99
Mitchell Jones	Vancouver/Philadelphia	19	44	82	126	14	119
Tom Schreiber	Toronto Rock	18	48	68	116	2	110
Connor Fields	Rochester Knighthawks	17	52	60	112	12	142
Joe Resetarits	Philadelphia Wings	18	41	69	110	2	62
Wesley Berg	San Diego Seals	18	39	70	109	12	100
Lyle Thompson	Georgia Swarm	18	46	60	106	2	113
Andrew Kew	Georgia Swarm	16	43	63	106	2	91
Robert Church	Saskatchewan Rush	18	51	53	104	8	82

== Leading goaltenders ==
Note: GP = Games played; Mins = Minutes played; W = Wins; L = Losses: GA = Goals Allowed; SV% = Save Percentage; GAA = Goals against average

Player	Team	GP	Mins	W	L	GA	SV%	GAA
Nick Rose	Toronto Rock	18	1056	13	5	159	0.804	9.03
Christian Del Bianco	Calgary Roughnecks	18	1080	13	5	167	0.810	9.28
Nick Damude	Panther City Lacrosse Club	18	971	10	6	167	0.788	10.31
Matt Vinc	Buffalo Bandits	18	1047	14	4	182	0.803	10.42
Brett Dobson	Georgia Swarm	18	881	8	7	157	0.779	10.69

== Playoffs ==
Conference Semifinal
E1	Buffalo	20
E4	Rochester	8
Eastern Conference
E2	Toronto	15
E3	Halifax	11
W1	San Diego	12
W4	Colorado	13
Western Conference
W2	Calgary	12
W3	Panther City	9

Conference Final (best of 3)
E1	Buffalo	2
E2	Toronto	0
W4	Colorado	2
W2	Calgary	1

NLL Final (best of 3)
E1	Buffalo	2
W4	Colorado	1

=== Conference Semifinal ===
==== (E1) Buffalo Bandits vs. (E4) Rochester Knighthawks ====
May 6, 2023	Buffalo Bandits	20–8 (3–0, 5–4, 6–3, 6–1)	Rochester Knighthawks	KeyBank Center; Attendance: 14,794

Game reference

Matt Vinc
Devlin Shanahan
Goalies
Rylan Hartley
Riley Hutchcraft

MacKay (Byrne) – 00:23	1–0
Buchanan (Fraser, Cloutier) – 05:21	2–0
Byrne (PP) – 09:56	3–0
	3–1	16:38 – Cattoni (Fields)
	3–2	17:25 – Cattoni
	3–3	20:17 – Cattoni (Fields)
Cloutier (Byrne, Smith) (PP) – 23:10	4–3
	4–4	24:03 – Fields (Smith, Cattoni) (PP)
Cloutier (Fraser, Byrne) – 24:48	5–4
Smith (Cloutier) – 25:36	6–4
Smith (Nanticoke) – 27:18	7–4
Nanticoke (Smith, Byrne) – 29:29	8–4
	8–5	31:14 – Smith (Gilray, Hasen)
	8–6	34:16 – Hoggarth (Cattoni, Evans) (PP)
Smith (Cloutier, MacKay) – 37:25	9–6
MacKay – 39:01	10–6
Priolo – 39:39	11–6
Buchanan (Smith) – 39:57	12–6
Byrne (Cloutier, Smith) – 40:54	13–6
	13–7	41:16 – Knight (Smith, Fields)
Byrne (MacKay) – 43:00	14–7
Fraser (Weiss, Vinc) – 45:34	15–7
McCulley (Smith, Buchanan) – 47:43	16–7
Nanticoke – 49:45	17–7
Buchanan (Smith, MacKay) – 50:13	18–7
Clouiter (Smith, Byrne) – 50:38	19–7
Byrne (Buchanan, Nanticoke) – 52:50	20–7
	20–8	59:05 – Cattoni (Fields, Smith) (PP)

10 min
Penalties
10 min
60
Shots
58

==== (E2) Toronto Rock vs. (E3) Halifax Thunderbirds ====
May 5, 2023	Toronto Rock	15–11 (3–1, 2–4, 4–1, 6–5)	Halifax Thunderbirds	FirstOntario Centre; Attendance: 8,831

Game reference

Nick Rose
Goalies
Warren Hill

Keogh (Small, Rogers) – 01:06	1–0
	1–1	01:13 – Hossack
Small (Rogers, Dawson) (PP) – 11:24	2–1
Manns (Jubenville, Rose) – 11:42	3–1
Dawson (Manns, Hostrawser) (PP) – 16:44	4–1
	4–2	18:36 – Boushy (Terefenko)
Small (Craig, Jay) – 19:58	5–2
	5–3	21:46 – Staats (Boushy) (PP)
	5–4	22:02 – Benesch (Terefenko, Withers)
	5–5	28:39 – Brock (Hill)
Craig (Dawson) – 32:43	6–5
	6–6	34:54 – Staats (Benesch, Withers) (PP)
Small (Manns, Rogers) (PP) – 36:37	7–6
Harris (de Snoo) – 37:16	8–6
Keogh (Manns, Dawson) – 38:07	9–6
Craig (Kri) – 47:11	10–6
Manns (Small, Keogh) – 48:05	11–6
	11–7	48:55 – Staats (Boushy, Petterson)
	11–8	49:13 – Boushy (Jamieson, Withers)
	11–9	50:59 – Boushy (Theede)
Manns (Keogh) – 55:30	12–9
	12–10	56:57 – Benesch (Boushy, Jamieson)
de Snoo (ENG) – 57:33	13–10
Jay (Corbeil) (ENG) – 58:51	14–10
	14–11	59:24 – Petterson (Jamieson) (PP)
Downing (ENG) – 59:30	15–11

17 min
Penalties
26 min
53
Shots
41

==== (W1) San Diego Seals vs. (W4) Colorado Mammoth ====
May 5, 2023	San Diego Seals	12–13 (1–3, 2–4, 4–3, 5–3)	Colorado Mammoth	Pechanga Arena; Attendance: 5,210

Game reference

Frankie Scigliano
Goalies
Dillon Ward

	0–1	04:08 – Gilles (Ward)
	0–2	05:44 – Wardle (Lee, McLaughlin)
Dobbie (Dickson) – 10:38	1–2
	1–3	11:28 – McLaughlin (Lee, Williams)
	1–4	20:37 – Williams (Robinson)
	1–5	21:56 – Lee (McLaughlin)
Dickson (Staats, Crowley) – 23:18	2–5
	2–6	24:35 – McLaughlin (Williams, Lee)
	2–7	29:14 – Lee (Joaquim, Ward)
Crowley (Dobbie, Dickson) (PP) – 29:51	3–7
Staats (Dobbie, Belgrave) – 33:45	4–7
Berg (Dickson, Dobbie) – 34:10	5–7
	5–8	Edwards – 35:01
Crowley (Berg, O'Keefe) – 36:26	6–8
	6–9	39:02 – Lee (Williams, Gibson)
	6–10	40:05 – Williams (Kinnear)
O'Keefe (Dickson) – 43:17	7–10
Staats (Berg) – 47:05	8–10
	8–11	48:58 – Lee (Lintz, Hope) (SH)
Berg (Dobbie, Crowley) (PP) – 49:29	9–11
Staats (Crowley) (PP) – 51:27	10–11
O'Keefe (Dickson) – 53:21	11–11
	11–12	55:43 – McLaughlin (Lee)
Crowley – 56:44	12–12
	12–13	59:58 – McLaughlin (Lee) (PP)

2 min
Penalties
8 min
64
Shots
45

==== (W2) Calgary Roughnecks vs. (W3) Panther City Lacrosse Club ====
May 6, 2023	Calgary Roughnecks	12–9 (4–6, 4–1, 0–2, 4–0)	Panther City Lacrosse Club	Scotiabank Saddledome; Attendance: 10,104

Game reference

Christian Del Bianco
Goalies
Nick Damude

King (Cook, Pace) – 00:31	1–0
	1–1	00:52 – Donville (Gautier, W. Malcom) (PP)
	1–2	01:45 – Crawford (T. Malcom, Sellars)
	1–3	03:34 – Caputo (Donville, W. Malcom)
Pace (King, Cook) – 05:24	2–3
	2–4	07:30 – Dodds (Crawford, Hossack)
Cook (Pace, J. Currier) – 07:59	3–4
	3–5	09:16 – Gautier (Donville, Dodds)
	3–6	10:15 – Caputo (Dodds, Gautier)
Z. Currier (Del Bianco) – 14:19	4–6
King (Cook, J. Currier) – 17:39	5–6
Z. Currier (Callies) – 18:37	6–6
Cook (Pace) (PP) – 21:25	7–6
	7–7	27:38 – W. Malcom (Crawford, Grenon)
King (Pace) – 28:30	8–7
	8–8	30:52 – Dodds (Crawford, W. Malcom)
	8–9	44:54 – Hossack (Hutchison) (SH)
Pace (King) (PP) – 47:05	9–9
Pace (King) (PP) – 51:05	10–9
Pace (Cook, Dickson) – 57:54	11–9
Cornwall (Manning) (ENG) – 58:53	12–9

10 min
Penalties
12 min
50
Shots
46

=== Conference Final (best of three) ===
==== (E1) Buffalo Bandits vs. (E2) Toronto Rock ====
May 12, 2023	Buffalo Bandits	14–5 (4–3, 3–1, 6–0, 1–1)	Toronto Rock	KeyBank Center; Attendance: 11,510

Game reference

Matt Vinc
Goalies
Nick Rose
Troy Holowchuk

Byrne (Smith, Nanticoke) – 00:30	1–0
	1–1	04:38 – Schreiber (Rogers, Craig)
Nanticoke (Smith, McCulley) – 08:11	2–1
Fraser (Bomberry, Robinson) – 08:27	3–1
	3–2	09:51 – Rogers (Schreiber, Kri)
Robinson (Spanger) – 09:35	4–2
	4–3	13:30 – Rogers (Schreiber, Manns)
Byrne (Smith, Vinc) – 23:56	5–3
	5–4	26:28 – Rogers (Craig, Manns)
Byrne (Buchanan) – 24:25	6–4
Nanticoke (Byrne, Smith) – 27:23	7–4
Fraser – 31:29	8–4
MacKay – 33:31	9–4
Byrne (Buchanan, Smith) – 36:05	10–4
Buchanan (Cloutier, Smith) – 36:31	11–4
Byrne (Weiss, Sweeting) – 37:20	12–4
Cloutier (Smith) (PP) – 44:18	13–4
	13–5	45:21 – Schreiber (Manns, Rogers)
Cloutier (Smith, Byrne) (PP) – 55:32	14–5

18 min
Penalties
18 min
41
Shots
57

May 13, 2023	Toronto Rock	8–17 (3–3, 1–8, 3–3, 1–3)	Buffalo Bandits	FirstOntario Centre; Attendance: 8,304

Game reference

Nick Rose
Troy Holowchuk
Goalies
Matt Vinc
Devlin Shanahan

	0–1	01:19 – Byrne (McCulley)
Small (Dawson, Mazzuca) – 02:48	1–1
	1–2	06:49 – Smith (Byrne, Buchanan)
Mazzuca – 11:56	2–2
	2–3	10:25 – Nanticoke (Byrne, Buchanan) (SH)
Small – 12:15	3–3
	3–4	18:18 – Cloutier (Priolo, O'Connor) (SH)
Craig (Small, Rogers) (PP) – 18:40	4–4
	4–5	21:52 – Cloutier (Smith, Byrne) (PP)
	4–6	22:24 – Smith (Byrne) (PP)
	4–7	23:28 – Cloutier (Byrne)
	4–8	23:38 – Nanticoke (MacKay)
	4–9	25:09 – Cloutier (Buchanan, Byrne)
	4–10	25:22 – Nanticoke (Smith, Cloutier)
	4–11	25:41 – Fraser (Buchanan, Byrne)
Jubenville (Harris, Rose) – 33:28	5–11
	5–12	33:58 – Robinson
Craig (Rogers, Dawson) (PP) – 36:41	6–12
	6–13	37:49 – Smith (Byrne, Nanticoke)
Craig (Dawson) (PP) – 41:17	7–13
	7–14	44:25 – Byrne (Cloutier, Smith)
Slade (Downing, Corbeil) – 49:16	8–14
	8–15	52:24 – Cloutier (Smith, Weiss)
	8–16	52:52 – Priolo (Vinc)
	8–17	54:41 – Cloutier (Smith) (ENG)

14 min
Penalties
12 min
47
Shots
57

Bandits win series 2–0.

==== (W2) Calgary Roughnecks vs. (W4) Colorado Mammoth ====
May 11, 2023	Colorado Mammoth	8–7 (0–2, 3–3, 3–2, 2–0)	Calgary Roughnecks	Ball Arena; Attendance: 8,183

Game reference

Dillon Ward
Goalies
Christian Del Bianco

	0–1	05:37 – Cook (King)
	0–2	07:04 – Cook (King, J. Currier) (PP)
	0–3	15:10 – Z. Currier
Williams (Robinson) – 15:43	1–3
	1–4	15:54 – Cornwall (J. Currier, Willman)
Robinson (Lee, Joaquim) – 17:31	2–4
Gilles (Jeffrey) – 20:37	3–4
	3–5	24:15 – Van Schepen (Z. Currier)
Wardle (McLaughlin, Lee) (PP) – 30:27	4–5
McLaughlin (Gilles, Sullivan) (SH) – 32:02	5–5
Wardle (Robinson, McLaughlin) (PP) – 34:28	6–5
	6–6	38:33 – Taylor (Herreweyers, Waters)
	6–7	40:23 – Taylor (Cook, J. Currier)
Robinson (Lee, Williams) (PP) – 54:06	7–7
Robinson (Williams, Lee) (PP) – 56:49	8–7

4 min
Penalties
14 min
50
Shots
43

May 13, 2023	Calgary Roughnecks	13–12 (2–2, 3–1, 4–3, 4–6)	Colorado Mammoth	Scotiabank Saddledome; Attendance: 7,681

Game reference

Christian Del Bianco
Goalies
Dillon Ward

	0–1	07:58 – Robinson (Williams)
Simpson – 08:40	1–1
King (Pace, Dickson) (PP) – 09:33	2–1
	2–2	12:13 – Jeffrey
Taylor (King, Simpson) – 22:29	3–2
Pace (King) (PP) – 24:05	4–2
	4–3	26:41 – Williams (Robinson) (PP)
Cook (Z. Currier) – 29:46	5–3
Pace (King, Simpson) – 31:21	6–3
	6–4	32:40 – Williams (Lee)
Taylor (King, J. Currier) – 35:54	7–4
	7–5	39:34 – McLaughlin (Lee, Wardle)
J. Currier (Waters, King) – 40:27	8–5
	8–6	42:11 – Kinnear (Robinson, Lee)
Z. Currier (Waters, Dickson) – 44:18	9–6
King (Pace) – 46:18	10–6
	10–7	47:09 – Robinson (McLaughlin, Lintz)
Cook (Pace, Dickson) – 47:39	11–7
	11–8	48:42 – Robinson (Lee, McLaughlin)
	11–9	49:52 – Wardle (Lee, Robinson)
	11–10	50:54 – McLaughlin (Wardle, Kinnear)
Cook (King, Pace) – 54:35	12–10
Pace (Cook) – 56:39	13–10
	13–11	58:09 – McIntyre (Robinson, Lee)
	13–12	58:35 – Williams (McLaughlin, McIntyre)

8 min
Penalties
10 min
50
Shots
44

May 20, 2023	Calgary Roughnecks	7–9 (4–2, 1–4, 2–0, 0–3)	Colorado Mammoth	Scotiabank Saddledome; Attendance: 8,251

Game reference

Christian Del Bianco
Goalies
Dillon Ward

Cornwall (LeClair) (SH) – 00:49	1–0
	1–1	01:08 – McLaughlin (Robinson) (PP)
King (Waters) – 08:01	2–1
Dickson (King, Cornwall) – 10:40	3–1
	3–2	11:37 – Williams (Jeffrey)
Waters (Cook, Dickson) – 12:39	4–2
	4–3	16:11 – Lee (McLaughlin, McIntosh)
	4–4	16:29 – Wardle (Gibson, Williams)
Z. Currier (Simpson) (SH) – 20:23	5–4
	5–5	20:53 – Gibson (Wardle, Williams)
	5–6	24:40 – Edwards (Jeffrey)
Cook (Dickson) – 31:11	6–6
Simpson (Z. Currier, Callies) (SH) – 33:18	7–6
	7–7	51:08 – Williams (Lee, McLaughlin)
	7–8	53:32 – Jeffrey
	7–9	59:46 – Robinson (Gilles) (ENG)

12 min
Penalties
8 min
40
Shots
37

Mammoth wins series 2–1.

=== NLL Final (best of three) ===
May 27, 2023	Buffalo Bandits	13–12 (5–4, 2–4, 5–1, 1–3)	Colorado Mammoth	KeyBank Center; Attendance: 14,260

Game reference

Matt Vinc
Goalies
Dillon Ward

Smith (Cloutier) – 00:40	1–0
Smith (Nanticoke, MacKay) – 02:02	2–0
Fraser – 04:36	3–0
Smith (Cloutier) (PP) – 08:16	4–0
	4–1	10:11 – Downey (Edwards)
	4–2	11:36 – Lee (Williams, Garrison)
Smith (MacKay, Buchanan) – 12:01	5–2
	5–3	14:07 – Williams (Lee, Robinson)
	5–4	14:57 – McLaughlin (Gibson, Robinson)
MacKay (Buchanan) – 16:29	6–4
	6–5	17:39 – Gibson (McLaughlin)
	6–6	18:12 – Robinson (McLaughlin, Williams) (PP)
	6–7	25:45 – Gibson (McLaughlin) (PP)
McCulley (Nanticoke, Weiss) – 24:44	7–7
	7–8	27:34 – Lee (Kinnear)
Nanticoke (MacKay, Buchanan) (PP) – 30:24	8–8
Fraser (Smith, MacKay) (SH) – 31:31	9–8
Smith (Weiss, MacKay) – 33:01	10–8
Nanticoke (Cloutier, Buchanan) – 33:24	11–8
	11–9	34:06 – McLaughlin (Lee, Williams)
Nanticoke (MacKay, Buchanan) (PP) – 37:00	12–9
	12–10	45:38 – Williams (Lee) (PP)
Fraser (Cloutier, Buchanan) (PP) – 48:13	13–10
	13–11	47:37 – Wardle (Robinson, Downey)
	13–12	54:42 – McLaughlin (Lee, Robinson) (PP)

12 min
Penalties
12 min
54
Shots
43

May 29, 2023	Colorado Mammoth	16–10 (4–3, 5–4, 5–1, 1–5)	Buffalo Bandits	Ball Arena; Attendance: 10,686

Game reference

Dillon Ward
Tyler Carlson
Goalies
Matt Vinc
Devlin Shanahan

	0–1	04:00 – MacKay (Smith, Priolo)
	0–2	07:54 – Buchanan (Cloutier) (PP)
Wardle (Chaster, Lee) – 10:43	1–2
	1–3	12:23 – Smith (Cloutier) (PP)
Edwards (Gilles) – 12:33	2–3
Robinson (Hope, Ward) – 13:35	3–3
Lee (Williams, Robinson) – 16:24	4–3
Lee (McLaughlin, Kinnear) – 16:48	5–3
	5–4	20:29 – Smith (Cloutier)
Lee (McLaughlin, Williams) (PP) – 21:34	6–4
Robinson (Lee, McLaughlin) (PP) – 24:37	7–4
	7–5	26:43 – Cloutier (Smith)
Williams (McIntosh, Jeffrey) – 29:14	8–5
McLaughlin (Robinson) (PP) – 33:23	9–5
	9–6	33:52 – Nanticoke (Smith, Cloutier) (PP)
Lee (Williams, Gibson) – 34:48	10–6
McLaughlin (Kinnear, Downey) – 36:54	11–6
	11–7	38:36 – Nanticoke (Priolo, McCulley)
Williams (Downey) – 39:01	12–7
McLaughlin (Lee, Williams) (PP) – 43:36	13–7
Gibson (McLaughlin) (PP) – 46:33	14–7
	14–8	47:40 – Nanticoke (Smith)
	14–9	51:27 – Fraser (Smith, Buchanan)
Robinson (Joaquim, Hope) (SH) – 55:29	15–9
	15–10	55:46 – Nanticoke (Buchanan, Smith) (PP)
Kinnear (PS) – 59:26	16–10

16 min
Penalties
50 min
59
Shots
48

June 3, 2023	Buffalo Bandits	13–4 (2–1, 2–1, 4–1, 5–1)	Colorado Mammoth	KeyBank Center; Attendance: 18,296

Game reference

Matt Vinc
Goalies
Dillon Ward

Nanticoke (Byrne, Priolo) – 01:40	1–0
	1–1	05:06 – Robinson (Lee, Kinnear)
Byrne (Smith) (PP) – 14:59	2–1
Fraser (Robinson, Priolo) – 18:27	3–1
Fraser (Smith, Cloutier) – 25:20	4–1
	4–2	27:32 – McLaughlin (Williams) (PP)
Byrne (Smith) – 30:28	5–2
Byrne (Smith, Nanticoke) – 33:14	6–2
	6–3	40:33 – McLaughlin (Robinson)
Byrne (Smith, Nanticoke) – 41:02	7–3
Smith (Fraser) – 42:42	8–3
Cloutier (Byrne, Smith) (PP) – 48:24	9–3
	9–4	48:51 – Wardle (McLaughlin, Robinson)
Spanger (MacKay) – 49:10	10–4
McCulley (Smith, Byrne) – 50:28	11–4
Adler – 50:33	12–4
Smith (Cloutier) – 54:19	13–4

4 min
Penalties
8 min
60
Shots
51

Bandits win series 2–1

== Awards ==
=== Annual awards ===
Award	Winner	Other Finalists
Most Valuable Player	Christian Del Bianco, Calgary Roughnecks	Dhane Smith, Buffalo Bandits; Jeff Teat, New York Riptide
Goaltender of the Year	Christian Del Bianco, Calgary Roughnecks	Nick Rose, Toronto Rock; Matt Vinc, Buffalo Bandits
Defensive Player of the Year	Latrell Harris, Toronto Rock	Graeme Hossack, Halifax Thunderbirds; Brad Kri, Toronto Rock
Transition Player of the Year	Zach Currier, Calgary Roughnecks	Reid Bowering, Vancouver Warriors; Challen Rogers, Toronto Rock
Rookie of the Year	Jonathan Donville, Panther City Lacrosse Club	Brett Dobson, Georgia Swarm; Jack Hannah, Las Vegas Desert Dogs
Sportsmanship Award	Lyle Thompson, Georgia Swarm	Kyle Buchanan, Buffalo Bandits; Tom Schreiber, Toronto Rock
GM of the Year	Dan Carey, Rochester Knighthawks	Mike Board, Calgary Roughnecks; Jamie Dawick, Toronto Rock
Les Bartley Award	Curt Malawsky, Calgary Roughnecks	Tracey Kelusky, Panther City Lacrosse Club; Mike Hasen, Rochester Knighthawks
Executive of the Year Award	Mark Fine, Las Vegas Desert Dogs	Melissa Blades, Calgary Roughnecks; Matt Hutchings, Colorado Mammoth
Teammate of the Year Award	Dan Dawson, Toronto Rock	Kyle Buchanan, Buffalo Bandits; John LaFontaine, Albany FireWolves
Tom Borrelli Award	Teddy Jenner, TSN, Off The Crossebar Podcast	Adam Levi, NLL, Lacrosse Flash; Pat Gregoire, Halifax Thunderbirds, Off The Crossebar Podcast

== Stadiums and locations ==
Georgia Swarm	Albany FireWolves	New York Riptide	Philadelphia Wings
Gas South Arena	MVP Arena	Nassau Coliseum	Wells Fargo Center
Capacity: 11,355	Capacity: 14,236	Capacity: 13,917	Capacity: 19,543

Buffalo Bandits	Halifax Thunderbirds	Rochester Knighthawks	Toronto Rock
KeyBank Center	Scotiabank Centre	Blue Cross Arena	First Ontario Centre
Capacity: 19,070	Capacity: 10,595	Capacity: 11,200	Capacity: 17,383

Calgary Roughnecks	Colorado Mammoth	San Diego Seals	Saskatchewan Rush
WestJet Field at Scotiabank Saddledome	Ball Arena	Pechanga Arena	Co-op Field at SaskTel Centre
Capacity: 19,289	Capacity: 18,007	Capacity: 12,920	Capacity: 15,190

Vancouver Warriors	Las Vegas Desert Dogs	Panther City Lacrosse Club
Rogers Arena	Michelob Ultra Arena	Dickies Arena
Capacity: 18,910	Capacity: 12,000	Capacity: 12,200

== Attendance ==
=== Regular season ===
Home team	Home games	Average attendance	Total attendance
Buffalo Bandits	9	14,731	132,581
Calgary Roughnecks	9	11,665	104,984
Colorado Mammoth	9	9,972	89,748
Toronto Rock	9	9,423	84,806
Georgia Swarm	9	8,665	77,984
Saskatchewan Rush	9	8,606	77,454
Philadelphia Wings	9	8,530	76,768
Halifax Thunderbirds	9	8,512	76,604
Vancouver Warriors	9	8,166	73,489
Las Vegas Desert Dogs	9	5,960	53,636
San Diego Seals	9	5,115	46,032
Rochester Knighthawks	9	5,114	46,024
New York Riptide	9	4,612	41,501
Albany FireWolves	9	3,610	32,491
Panther City LC	9	2,813	25,316
League	135	7,700	1,039,418

=== Playoffs ===
Home team	Home games	Average attendance	Total attendance
Buffalo Bandits	4	14,715	58,860
Calgary Roughnecks	3	8,679	26,036
Colorado Mammoth	2	9,435	18,869
Toronto Rock	2	8,568	17,135
San Diego Seals	1	5,210	5,210
League	12	10,509	126,110

== See also ==
- 2023 in sports
