= National Lacrosse League Teammate of the Year Award =

The National Lacrosse League Teammate of the Year Award is given annually to an NLL player chosen by his peers.

== Past winners ==
| Season | Winner | Team | Win # | Other finalists |
|---|---|---|---|---|
| 2026 | Luc Magnan | Ottawa Black Bears | 1 | Cam Dunkerley, San Diego Seals; Robert Hope, Colorado Mammoth |
| 2025 | Keegan Bell | Saskatchewan Rush | 1 | Each team nominated one candidate for the award |
| 2024 | Zack Greer | Las Vegas Desert Dogs | 1 | Each team nominated one candidate for the award |
| 2023 | Dan Dawson | Toronto Rock | 2 | Kyle Buchanan, Buffalo Bandits; John LaFontaine, Albany FireWolves |
| 2022 | Jeremy Thompson | Panther City Lacrosse Club | 1 | Zach Currier, Calgary Roughnecks; Jeff Shattler, Saskatchewan Rush |
| 2021 | Season cancelled | | | |
| 2020 (tie) | Dan Dawson; Mike Poulin | Toronto Rock; Georgia Swarm | 1; 3 | John Ranagan, New England Black Wolves |
| 2019 | John Ranagan | Georgia Swarm | 1 | Kyle Buchanan, San Diego Seals; Chad Cummings, Calgary Roughnecks |
| 2018 | Craig England | Buffalo Bandits | 1 | Chris Corbeil, Saskatchewan Rush; Brandon Miller, Toronto Rock |
| 2017 | Mike Poulin | Georgia Swarm | 2 | Kyle Buchanan, New England Black Wolves; Joel McCready, Vancouver Stealth |
| 2016 | Mike Poulin | Calgary Roughnecks | 1 | Joel McCready, Vancouver Stealth; Andrew Watt, Buffalo Bandits |
