= Dhane Smith =

Canadian lacrosse player (born 1992)

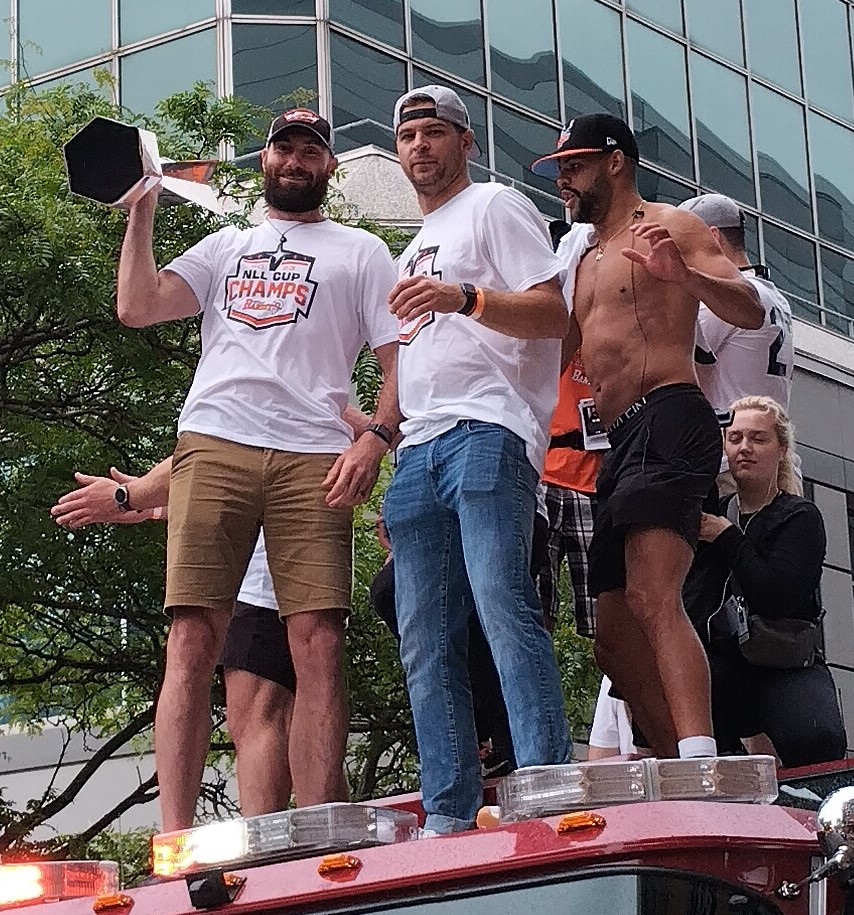
- Smith, on the right, celebrating the 2023 NLL championship with teammates Steve Priolo (left) and Nick Weiss (center)

Personal information
- Nationality: Canadian
- Born: September 23, 1992 (age 33) Kitchener, Ontario, Canada
- Height: 6 ft 3 in (191 cm)
- Weight: 195 lb (88 kg; 13 st 13 lb)

Sport
- Position: Forward/Transition (Box), Midfield (Field)
- Shoots: Right
- NLL draft: 5th overall, 2012; Buffalo Bandits
- NLL team: Buffalo Bandits
- MLL teams: Rochester Rattlers; Chesapeake Bayhawks
- PLL team: Chaos LC
- CLA teams: Kitchener-Waterloo Kodiaks; Victoria Shamrocks
- Pro career: 2013–

Career highlights
- NLL: 2x MVP (2016, 2022); 3x NLL Cup Champion (2023, 2024, 2025); 2023 NLL Cup Finals MVP; 4x First Team All-League (2016, 2022, 2023, 2025); 1x Second Team All-League (2024); Regular season record for goals (72, 2016); Regular season record for assists (102, 2025); Regular season record for points (137, 2016); PLL: 1x Champion (2021); 2x All-Star (2021, 2023)

Dhane Smith (born January 22, 1992) is a Canadian professional lacrosse player for the Buffalo Bandits of the National Lacrosse League. He is also a player for the Chaos Lacrosse Club in the Premier Lacrosse League. He also plays for the Canadian men's indoor lacrosse team and the Canada men's lacrosse team.

In the NLL, he has won the MVP award twice and has won 3 consecutive championships with the Bandits from 2023 to 2025 (where he was named the championship game MVP in 23), and in 2024 set the NLL single-season assists record (101) and all-time playoffs assists record. In the PLL, he won a championship with the Chaos in 2021, and was named an All-Star in 2021 and 2023. He also won a gold medal at the 2019 World Indoor Lacrosse Championships for Canada.

He is known for his offensive effectiveness and astute passing skills and holds the current NLL single-season points record, while also simultaneously holding both the current single-season goals record and the current NLL single-season assists record.

== Early life ==
Smith grew up in the heart of Kitchener. A lacrosse player from birth, he later in life transitioned into hockey and football, where he reached elite levels in both. Known by many as a multi-sport athlete, Smith led his high school football team to a championship final while running the offence as a gunslinging mobile quarterback.

Smith is a cousin of former NLL Defensive Player of the Year Billy Dee Smith.

== Professional career ==
Smith began his career in 2009 with the Kitchener-Waterloo Braves of the Ontario Junior A Lacrosse League, where he won the Green Gael Trophy as the league's MVP in 2012. Smith also played for the Kitchener-Waterloo Kodiaks of Major Series Lacrosse, and the Victoria Shamrocks of the Western Lacrosse Association.

=== NLL ===
Heading into the 2023 NLL season, Inside Lacrosse ranked Smith the #1 best forward in the NLL.

Smith declined several offers from NCAA universities and instead declared for the 2012 NLL draft. Smith was drafted fifth overall by the Bandits in the 2012 NLL Entry Draft. He began his NLL career as a transition player, but eventually switched to forward. He ranked third on the Bandits in scoring in both 2013 and 2014. In 2016, he set a Bandits record for most goals in a season and set the NLL single-season record for most points in a season. At the end of the season, Smith was named NLL MVP, becoming the first Black player to win the award.

Smith won his second MVP award during the 2022 season, where he set the single season record for assists with 94, making him the fifth player ever to become a multi-time MVP. The following season, he broke his assist record, finishing with 96, and was runner-up to Christian Del Bianco for MVP, while being named first team All-NLL for the third time.

=== MLL ===
Smith joined the Rochester Rattlers of Major League Lacrosse ahead of the 2016 season despite having little experience in field lacrosse, where he played under coach Tim Soudan.

=== PLL ===
Smith played for Chaos in the inaugural season of the Premier Lacrosse League, recording four points in five regular season games, and an additional four points in two playoff games. Smith became a focal point in the Chaos offense during the 2020 season, and in 2021, he finished second among all midfielders in assists with 13 before leading the playoffs with 18 points, en route to Chaos' first championship.

== International career ==
Smith has represented Canada at the World Indoor Lacrosse Championship twice, winning gold medals in 2015 and 2019. He will represent Canada in field lacrosse at the 2023 World Lacrosse Championship.

== Personal life ==
Away from lacrosse, Smith hosts a podcast, The Dhane and Josh Show, with Bandits and Chaos teammate Josh Byrne. Both Smith and Byrne, who are Black Canadians, have supported the Black Lives Matter movement.

== Career stats ==
NLL:

Dhane Smith		Regular season									Playoffs								
Season	Team	GP	G	A	Pts	LB	PIM	Pts/GP	LB/GP	PIM/GP	GP	G	A	Pts	LB	PIM	Pts/GP	LB/GP	PIM/GP
2013	Buffalo Bandits	15	24	20	44	42	4	2.93	2.80	0.27	–	–	–	–	–	–	–	–	–
2014	Buffalo Bandits	18	20	39	59	79	9	3.28	4.39	0.50	4	7	7	14	12	0	3.50	3.00	0.00
2015	Buffalo Bandits	18	39	68	107	75	11	5.94	4.17	0.61	1	3	5	8	6	0	8.00	6.00	0.00
2016	Buffalo Bandits	18	72	65	137	111	9	7.61	6.17	0.50	4	13	14	27	14	2	6.75	3.50	0.50
2017	Buffalo Bandits	14	30	51	81	63	8	5.79	4.50	0.57	–	–	–	–	–	–	–	–	–
2018	Buffalo Bandits	18	37	68	105	95	0	5.83	5.28	0.00	–	–	–	–	–	–	–	–	–
2019	Buffalo Bandits	16	32	70	102	72	8	6.38	4.50	0.50	4	5	16	21	14	0	5.25	3.50	0.00
2020	Buffalo Bandits	8	15	33	48	48	4	6.00	6.00	0.50	–	–	–	–	–	–	–	–	–
2022	Buffalo Bandits	18	41	94	135	93	10	7.50	5.17	0.56	6	13	22	35	27	4	5.83	4.50	0.67
2023	Buffalo Bandits	18	36	96	132	99	6	7.33	5.50	0.33	6	15	34	49	23	2	8.17	3.83	0.33
2024	Buffalo Bandits	18	33	101	134	119	8	7.44	6.61	0.44	5	7	27	34	34	2	6.80	6.80	0.40
2025	Buffalo Bandits	18	32	102	134	116	6	7.44	6.44	0.33	6	13	19	32	26	0	5.33	4.33	0.00
2026	Buffalo Bandits	18	39	79	118	86	6	6.56	4.78	0.33	1	0	2	2	8	0	2.00	8.00	0.00
		215	450	886	1,336	1,098	89	6.21	5.11	0.41	37	76	146	222	164	10	6.00	4.43	0.27
Career Total:		252	526	1,032	1,558	1,262	99	6.18	5.01	0.39									

GP–Games played; G–Goals; A–Assists; Pts–Points; LB–Loose balls; PIM–Penalty minutes; Pts/GP–Points per games played; LB/GP–Loose balls per games played; PIM/GP–Penalty minutes per games played.

PLL:

Season	Team	Regular season											Playoffs										
Season	Team	GP	G	2PG	A	Pts	Sh	GB	Pen	PIM	FOW	FOA	GP	G	2PG	A	Pts	Sh	GB	Pen	PIM	FOW	FOA
2019	Chaos	5	2	0	2	4	8	0	0	0	0	0	2	3	0	1	4	4	0	0	0	0	0
2020	Chaos	7	6	0	4	10	19	8	0	0	0	0	–	–	–	–	–	–	–	–	–	–	–
2021	Chaos	9	7	0	13	20	22	10	2	1.5	0	0	3	8	1	9	18	13	3	0	0	0	0
2022	Chaos	7	6	0	17	23	29	4	0	0	0	0	3	2	0	3	5	12	3	1	0.5	0	0
2023	Chaos	8	5	0	25	30	24	4	2	1.5	0	0	1	1	0	3	4	4	1	0	0	0	0
		36	26	0	61	87	102	26	4	3	0	0	9	14	1	16	31	33	7	1	0.5	0	0
Career total:		45	40	1	77	118	135	33	5	3.5	0	0											

GP–Games played; G–Goals; 2PG–2-point goals; A–Assists; Pts–Points; Sh–Shots; GB–Ground balls; Pen–Penalties; PIM–Penalty minutes; FOW–Faceoffs won; FOA–Faceoffs attempted

Season	Team	Regular season											Playoffs										
Season	Team	GP	G	2PG	A	Pts	Sh	GB	Pen	PIM	FOW	FOA	GP	G	2PG	A	Pts	Sh	GB	Pen	PIM	FOW	FOA
2016	Rochester Rattlers	3	8	0	2	10	19	3	0	0	0	0	–	–	–	–	–	–	–	–	–	–	–
2017	Rochester Rattlers	4	3	0	9	12	13	4	0	0	0	0	1	0	0	1	1	13	0	0	0	0	0
2018	Chesapeake Bayhawks	2	1	0	1	2	4	1	0	0	0	0	–	–	–	–	–	–	–	–	–	–	–
		9	12	0	12	24	36	8	0	0	0	0	1	0	0	1	1	13	0	0	0	0	0
Career total:		10	12	0	13	25	49	8	0	0	0	0											

GP–Games played; G–Goals; 2PG–2-point goals; A–Assists; Pts–Points; Sh–Shots; GB–Ground balls; Pen–Penalties; PIM–Penalty minutes; FOW–Faceoffs won; FOA–Faceoffs attempted

International:

Dhane Smith		Regular season									Playoffs								
Season	Team	GP	G	A	Pts	LB	PIM	Pts/GP	LB/GP	PIM/GP	GP	G	A	Pts	LB	PIM	Pts/GP	LB/GP	PIM/GP
2019	Canada	4	10	12	22	0	0	5.50	0.00	0.00	2	4	6	10	0	2	5.00	0.00	1.00
		4	10	12	22	0	0	5.50	0.00	0.00	2	4	6	10	0	2	5.00	0.00	1.00
Career Total:		6	14	18	32	0	2	5.33	0.00	0.33									

GP–Games played; G–Goals; A–Assists; Pts–Points; LB–Loose balls; PIM–Penalty minutes; Pts/GP–Points per games played; LB/GP–Loose balls per games played; PIM/GP–Penalty minutes per games played.

== Awards and achievements ==
Preceded by Shawn Evans	NLL Most Valuable Player; 2016	Succeeded by Lyle Thompson
Preceded by Shayne Jackson	NLL Most Valuable Player; 2022	Succeeded by Christian Del Bianco

- 2013 NLL All Rookie Team
- 2016 NLL MVP
- 2016 NLL All-League First Team
- Holds Buffalo Bandits and NLL single season records for goals (72, 2016), assists (101, 2024), and points (137, 2016).
- 2021 PLL Second Team All-Pro
- 2021 PLL Champion
- 2022 NLL MVP
- 2022 NLL All-League First Team
- 2023 NLL Cup Champion
- 2023 NLL Cup MVP
- 2023 NLL All-League First Team
- 2024 NLL Cup Champion
- 2024 NLL All-League Second Team
