= Chase Fraser =

Canadian lacrosse player (born 1995)

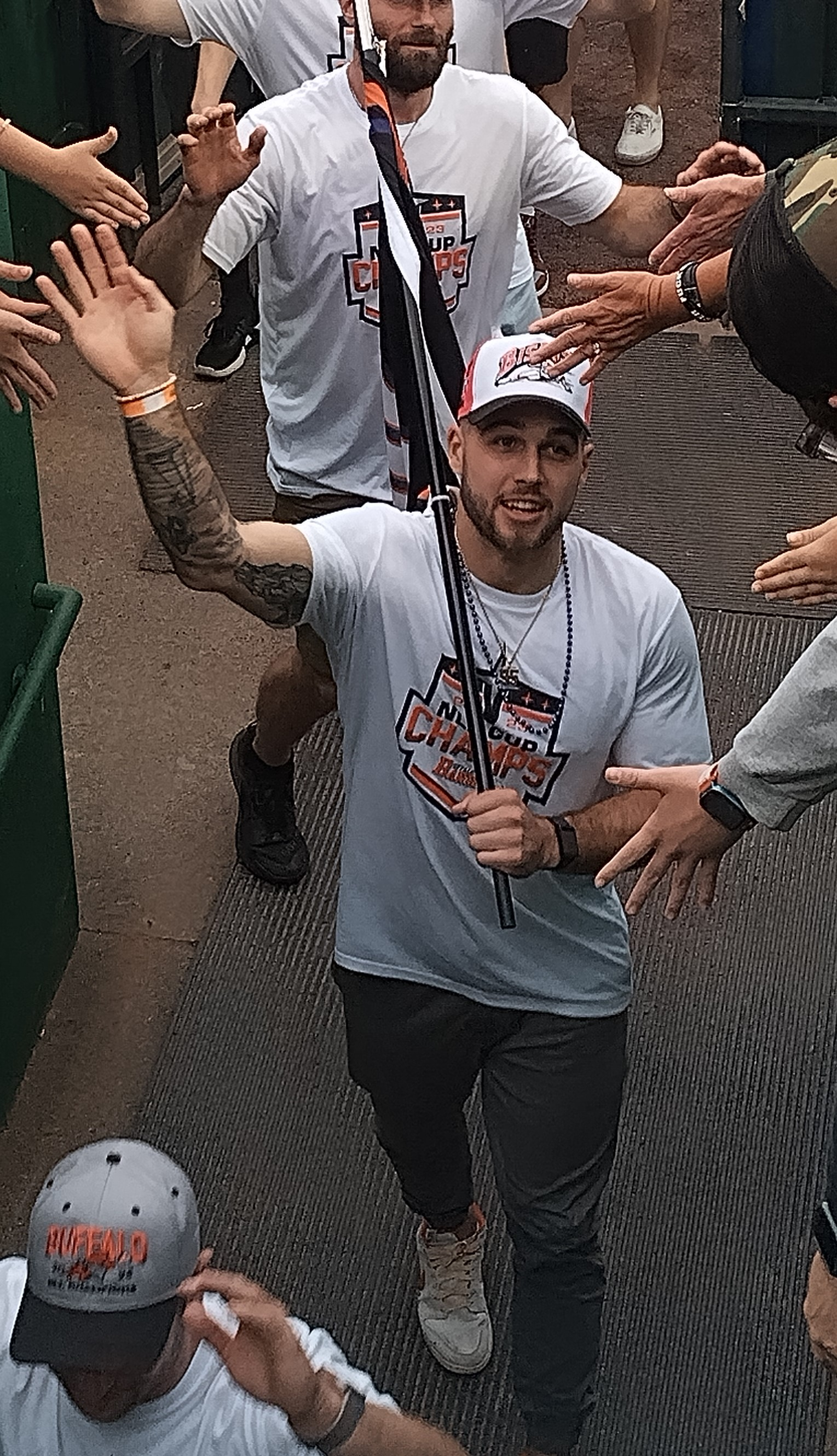
- Fraser with the Buffalo Bandits in 2023

Personal information
- Nationality: Canadian
- Born: August 3, 1995 (age 30) Vancouver, British Columbia, Canada
- Height: 6 ft 3 in (191 cm)
- Weight: 200 lb (91 kg; 14 st 4 lb)

Sport
- Position: Forward (box), Attack (field)
- Shoots: Right
- NCAA team: UDC Neumann (2017)
- NLL draft: 13th overall, 2017; Buffalo Bandits
- NLL team Former teams: Las Vegas Desert Dogs; Buffalo Bandits
- PLL team: Chaos LC
- Pro career: 2018–

Career highlights
- PLL: 1x Champion (2021); NLL: 3x Champion (2023, 2024, 2025)

Chase Fraser (born August 3, 1995) is a Canadian professional lacrosse player who plays as a forward for the Las Vegas Desert Dogs of the National Lacrosse League and as an attackman for Chaos Lacrosse Club of the Premier Lacrosse League.

== Early life and amateur Career ==
Born in Vancouver, British Columbia, Fraser's athletic career began with baseball, but he found the physicality of lacrosse more to his liking, and he developed a rivalry with future Bandits teammate Josh Byrne. From his Sophomore to Senior year of High School, he attended Blue Ridge School, an all boys, all boarding school in Saint George, Virginia, where he was recruited to play lacrosse. He helped Blue Ridge to their best lacrosse season in decades. Fraser played his first three years of college lacrosse for the District of Columbia Firebirds, where he tallied 87 goals and 22 assists over 33 games and helped inaugurate the lacrosse program at the University of the District of Columbia. Fraser spent his senior year at Neumann University, where he scored 66 goals in 14 games. He played junior lacrosse for the Delta Islanders of the BC Junior A Lacrosse League, where he played in the 2016 Minto Cup tournament. Fraser was taken third overall in the 2017 Western Lacrosse Association draft by the Nanaimo Timbermen. In 34 career regular season games with Nanaimo, he tallied 64 goals and 36 assists.

== Professional career ==
Fraser was drafted thirteenth overall in the 2017 NLL Entry Draft by the Buffalo Bandits. With the Bandits, Fraser reached the NLL Cup Finals in 2019 and 2022, and won the NLL Cup in 2023, 2024 and 2025.

On October 22, 2025, Fraser signed with the Las Vegas Desert Dogs.

In the field game, Fraser has played for the Chaos Lacrosse Club since 2021. He helped Chaos to a PLL Championship game appearance in 2022, and the league championship in 2021.

== Statistics ==
=== NLL ===
Chase Fraser		Regular season									Playoffs								
Season	Team	GP	G	A	Pts	LB	PIM	Pts/GP	LB/GP	PIM/GP	GP	G	A	Pts	LB	PIM	Pts/GP	LB/GP	PIM/GP
2018	Buffalo Bandits	9	8	6	14	41	8	1.56	4.56	0.89	–	–	–	–	–	–	–	–	–
2019	Buffalo Bandits	16	29	15	44	84	10	2.75	5.25	0.63	4	7	0	7	21	10	1.75	5.25	2.50
2020	Buffalo Bandits	8	16	10	26	34	21	3.25	4.25	2.63	–	–	–	–	–	–	–	–	–
2022	Buffalo Bandits	18	32	24	56	62	14	3.11	3.44	0.78	6	5	4	9	18	6	1.50	3.00	1.00
2023	Buffalo Bandits	4	9	3	12	16	6	3.00	4.00	1.50	6	10	3	13	19	4	2.17	3.17	0.67
2024	Buffalo Bandits	17	31	26	57	50	21	3.35	2.94	1.24	5	11	3	14	15	8	2.80	3.00	1.60
2025	Buffalo Bandits	17	26	24	50	42	20	2.94	2.47	1.18	6	8	4	12	3	6	2.00	0.50	1.00
		89	151	108	259	329	100	2.91	3.70	1.12	27	41	14	55	76	34	2.04	2.81	1.26
Career Total:		116	192	122	314	405	134	2.71	3.49	1.16									

GP–Games played; G–Goals; A–Assists; Pts–Points; LB–Loose balls; PIM–Penalty minutes; Pts/GP–Points per games played; LB/GP–Loose balls per games played; PIM/GP–Penalty minutes per games played.

=== PLL ===
Season	Team	Regular season											Playoffs										
Season	Team	GP	G	2PG	A	Pts	Sh	GB	Pen	PIM	FOW	FOA	GP	G	2PG	A	Pts	Sh	GB	Pen	PIM	FOW	FOA
2021	Chaos LC	5	12	0	1	13	35	5	1	0.5	0	0	3	6	0	2	8	16	5	0	0	0	0
2022	Chaos LC	7	12	0	1	13	39	15	2	1.5	0	0	3	2	0	0	2	10	1	1	2	0	0
2023	Chaos LC	3	4	0	0	4	17	4	0	0	0	0	1	0	0	0	0	2	0	0	0	0	0
		15	28	0	2	30	91	24	3	2	0	0	7	8	0	2	10	28	6	1	2	0	0
Career total:		22	36	0	4	40	119	30	4	4	0	0											

GP–Games played; G–Goals; 2PG–2-point goals; A–Assists; Pts–Points; Sh–Shots; GB–Ground balls; Pen–Penalties; PIM–Penalty minutes; FOW–Faceoffs won; FOA–Faceoffs attempted
