= Frankie Scigliano =

Canadian lacrosse player (born 1992)

Personal information
- Nationality: Canadian; English
- Born: January 16, 1992 (age 34) Coquitlam, British Columbia, Canada
- Height: 6 ft 4 in (193 cm)
- Weight: 290 lb (130 kg; 20 st 10 lb)

Sport
- Position: Goaltender
- Shoots: Right
- NLL draft: 18th overall, 2011; Calgary Roughnecks
- NLL team Former teams: Saskatchewan Rush; Calgary RoughnecksSan Diego Seals
- WLA team: Maple Ridge Burrards
- Pro career: 2012–

Frankie Scigliano (born January 16, 1992, in Coquitlam, British Columbia) is an English-Canadian professional box lacrosse goaltender for the Saskatchewan Rush in the National Lacrosse League. He was a second round draft pick (18th overall) in the 2011 NLL Entry Draft.

Scigliano played junior for the New Westminster Jr. Salmonbellies. The team went to the Minto Cup final in 2013, but lost to the Whitby Warriors. He was drafted 3rd overall in the Western Lacrosse Association 2014 draft by the Maple Ridge Burrards. He went on to win the WLA rookie of the year and best goalie awards in 2014.

Internationally, Scigliano represented England at the 2019 World Indoor Lacrosse Championship. Heading into the 2023 NLL season, Inside Lacrosse named Scigliano the #7 best goalie in the NLL.

In July 2023, Scigliano was traded to the Saskatchewan Rush.

== Awards ==
- John Urban Award, New Westminster Jr A Salmonbellies Top Rookie: 2010
- Ab Brown Award, New Westminster Jr A Salmonbellies Most Inspirational Player: 2011
- Jack Fulton Award, New Westminster Jr A Salmonbellies MVP: 2013
- WLA Ed Bayley Memorial Trophy (Rookie of the Year): 2014
- WLA Leo Nicholson Award for Outstanding Goaltender: 2014
- WLA All Star Team: 2014
