= Matt Hossack =

Lacrosse player

Personal information
- Nickname: Hoss
- Born: February 8, 1994 (age 32) Port Perry, Ontario, Canada
- Height: 6 ft 0 in (183 cm)
- Weight: 192 lb (87 kg; 13 st 10 lb)

Sport
- Position: Defence/Transition
- Shoots: Right
- NCAA team: Rochester Institute of Technology
- NLL draft: 14th overall, 2016; Saskatchewan Rush
- NLL team Former teams: Saskatchewan Rush; Panther City Lacrosse Club
- MLL team Former teams: Atlanta Blaze; Denver Outlaws
- PLL team: Philadelphia Waterdogs
- CLA team Former teams: Brooklin Lacrosse Club; Whitby Warriors
- Pro career: 2016–

Matt Hossack (born February 2, 1994) is a Canadian professional lacrosse player currently playing for the Saskatchewan Rush of the National Lacrosse League and for the Philadelphia Waterdogs of the Premier Lacrosse League.

== College career ==
Hossack attended the Rochester Institute of Technology, where he was named the Liberty League Defensive Player of the Year for two straight seasons with the RIT Tigers. At RIT he finished 5th all time in ground balls with 369 ground balls, as well as second all time in caused turnovers with 139.

== Professional career ==
Hossack was drafted 14th overall by the Saskatchewan Rush in 2016. He went on to win one NLL Championship in the 2018 NLL Cup Finals with the Rush. He was drafted in the 2020 NLL expansion draft by the Panther City Lacrosse Club.

Hossack has played for the Brooklin Lacrosse Club of the Major Series Lacrosse and has won a Minto Cup with the Whitby Warriors Junior A lacrosse club.

=== NLL stats ===
Matt Hossack		Regular season									Playoffs								
Season	Team	GP	G	A	Pts	LB	PIM	Pts/GP	LB/GP	PIM/GP	GP	G	A	Pts	LB	PIM	Pts/GP	LB/GP	PIM/GP
2017	Saskatchewan Rush	6	5	1	6	19	0	1.00	3.17	0.00	4	1	1	2	11	0	0.50	2.75	0.00
2018	Saskatchewan Rush	17	3	7	10	61	4	0.59	3.59	0.24	4	2	3	5	25	0	1.25	6.25	0.00
2019	Saskatchewan Rush	18	3	14	17	93	10	0.94	5.17	0.56	1	0	0	0	12	0	0.00	12.00	0.00
2020	Saskatchewan Rush	10	1	4	5	40	2	0.50	4.00	0.20	0	0	0	0	0	0	0.00	0.00	0.00
2021	Panther City Lacrosse Club	17	2	7	9	117	14	0.53	6.88	0.82	0	0	0	0	0	0	0.00	0.00	0.00
		68	14	33	47	330	30	0.69	4.85	0.44	9	3	4	7	48	0	0.78	5.33	0.00
Career Total:		77	17	37	54	378	30	0.70	4.91	0.39									

GP–Games played; G–Goals; A–Assists; Pts–Points; LB–Loose balls; PIM–Penalty minutes; Pts/GP–Points per games played; LB/GP–Loose balls per games played; PIM/GP–Penalty minutes per games played.

== Awards and honours ==
- Minto Cup, 2013 (with the Brooklin Lacrosse Club)
- 2015 Liberty League Defensive Player of the Year
- 2016 Liberty League Defensive Player of the Year
- NLL Cup, 2018 (with the Saskatchewan Rush)
- [NLL Defensive Player of the Year], 2025 (with the Saskatchewan Rush)
