= Teddy Jenner =

Canadian lacrosse player

Personal information
- Nationality: Canadian
- Born: July 23, 1979 (age 46) Victoria, British Columbia
- Height: 6 ft 1 in (185 cm)
- Weight: 200 lb (91 kg; 14 st 4 lb)

Sport
- Position: Transition
- Shoots: Left
- NLL draft: 11th overall, 2001; Rochester Knighthawks
- NLL teams: Edmonton Rush; Minnesota Swarm; Anaheim Storm; Rochester Knighthawks
- Pro career: 2002–2007

Teddy Jenner (born July 23, 1979 in Victoria, British Columbia) is a former box lacrosse player for the Victoria Shamrocks in the Western Lacrosse Association as well as a number of teams in the National Lacrosse League from 2002 to 2007. He is now a lacrosse analyst.

He now hosts the only radio show in Canada specifically focused on the game of lacrosse. The Off the Crosse-Bar Radio show debuted May 3, 2011 and airs Tuesday nights on TEAM 1410 in Vancouver BC. Listen Here You can hear past shows via podcast Here

You can also read his work and listen to his podcasts on ILIndoor.com where he covers the National Lacrosse League.

== Statistics ==
=== NLL ===
| | | Regular Season | | | | | | Playoffs |
| Season | Team | GP | G | A | Pts | LB | PIM | GP | G | A | Pts | LB | PIM |
|---|---|---|---|---|---|---|---|---|---|---|---|---|---|
| 2002 | Rochester | 3 | 6 | 4 | 10 | 13 | 0 | -- | -- | -- | -- | -- | -- |
| 2003 | Rochester | 9 | 2 | 5 | 7 | 26 | 4 | -- | -- | -- | -- | -- | -- |
| 2004 | Anaheim | 10 | 4 | 5 | 9 | 36 | 4 | -- | -- | -- | -- | -- | -- |
| 2005 | Minnesota | 8 | 4 | 3 | 7 | 31 | 12 | -- | -- | -- | -- | -- | -- |
| 2006 | Edmonton | 15 | 2 | 5 | 7 | 44 | 17 | -- | -- | -- | -- | -- | -- |
| 2007 | Edmonton | 6 | 2 | 7 | 9 | 7 | 4 | -- | -- | -- | -- | -- | -- |
| NLL totals | | 51 | 20 | 29 | 49 | 157 | 41 | 0 | 0 | 0 | 0 | 0 | 0 |
