= Nick Rose (lacrosse) =

Canadian lacrosse player (born 1988)

Personal information
- Born: February 11, 1988 (age 38) Orangeville, Ontario, Canada
- Height: 6 ft 0 in (183 cm)
- Weight: 285 lb (129 kg; 20 st 5 lb)

Sport
- Position: Goaltender
- Shoots: Right
- NLL draft: 28th overall, 2008; Toronto Rock
- NLL team Former teams: Toronto Rock; Boston Blazers; Calgary Roughnecks
Medal record
Representing Canada
Men's box lacrosse
World Lacrosse Box Championships
Winner	2024 Utica

Nick Rose (born February 11, 1988) is a Canadian professional box lacrosse goaltender currently playing for the Toronto Rock of the National Lacrosse League (NLL). He is also the current president and general manager of the Orangeville Northmen of the Ontario Junior Lacrosse League (OJLL). He was drafted 28th overall by the Toronto Rock in the 2008 NLL Entry Draft.

== Early life and education ==
Rose was born on February 11, 1988, in Orangeville, Ontario, Canada. His father Tony, a former lacrosse player, died when Rose was two years old and an arena was named in his honour.

== Playing career ==
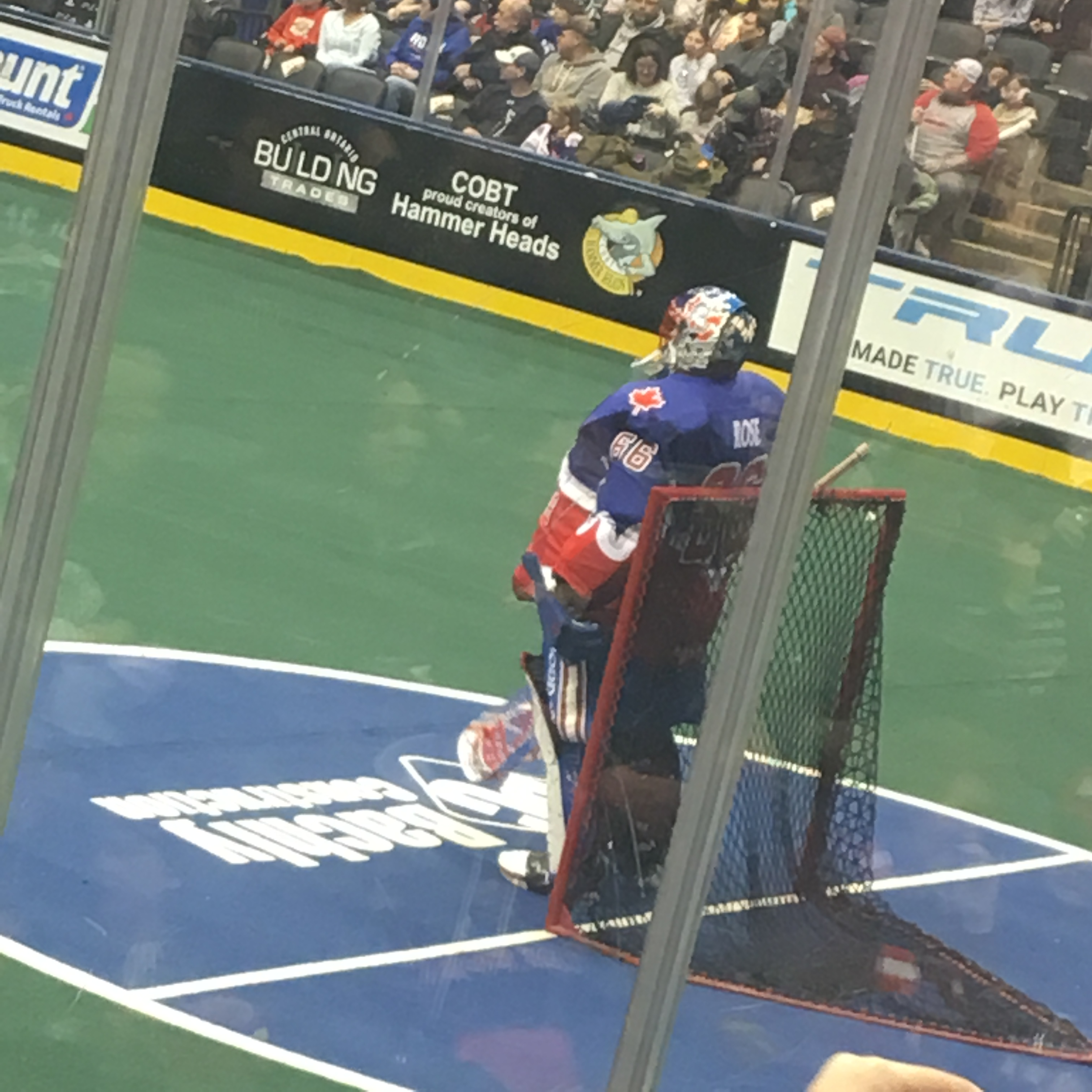
Rose in net for the Rock during a game against the Vancouver Warriors in 2020

=== Minor ===
As a youth, Rose competed with the Orangeville Northmen Jr. A lacrosse team. He was the recipient of the 2007 Junior A Rookie of the Year Award. The following year, Rose was drafted in 3rd round, 28th overall by the Toronto Rock in the 2008 National Lacrosse League Entry Draft and later helped the Northmen clinch the 2009 Canadian Lacrosse Association's Minto Cup, where he was also named MVP of the tournament.

=== Professional ===
In 2010, Rose made the Boston Blazers' opening night roster for the 2010 NLL season. He played his first career NLL game after Mike Poulin was traded to the Calgary Roughnecks and ended up playing a total of 22:05 minutes in his first year with the team. He returned to the Blazers for the 2011 season, before the team was dispersed.

Rose was drafted by the Calgary Roughnecks in the first round of the 2011 Boston Blazers Dispersal Draft. While with the Roughnecks, he played five games and registered 17 saves in two relief appearances. Rose was eventually traded to the Toronto Rock in March 2012 for a first-round pick in the 2014 NLL Entry Draft. He made his debut with the Rock on March 24, 2012, in a 13–7 win over the Rochester Knighthawks. Rose signed a one-year contract extension with the Rock on August 2, 2012. As the starting goaltender for the Rock, Rose went 6–8 in 2014 and 6–2 in 2015 as he led the team to the Champions Cup Finals. By 2016, Rose was named a finalist for the National Lacrosse League's Goaltender of the Year Award after ranking third in the NLL in goals against average and tied for sixth in wins with five. Rose later agreed to 3-year contract extension with the Rock on July 27, 2016.

The following year, Rose became the first goaltender in the NLL to score two goals in one season from his crease. At the conclusion of his three-year contract, Rose opted out of becoming an unrestricted free agent and signed a two-year extension with the Rock. Heading into the 2023 NLL season, Inside Lacrosse named Rose the #3 best goalie in the NLL.

On February 25, 2025, Rose was traded back to the Calgary Roughnecks alongside Tyler Hendrycks, and a 2025 fourth-round draft pick in exchange for the Roughnecks's 2026 first-round draft pick, Robert Hudson, and Gowah Abrams.

== Statistics ==
=== NLL ===
Nick Rose		Regular Season								Playoffs							
Season	Team	GP	Min	W	L	GA	GAA	Sv	Sv %	GP	Min	W	L	GA	GAA	Sv	Sv %
2010	Boston Blazers	2	22:05	1	0	3	8.15	20	0.870	–	–	–	–	–	–	–	–
2011	Boston Blazers	4	59:09	0	1	8	8.11	38	0.826	–	–	–	–	–	–	–	–
2012	Calgary Roughnecks	2	32:23	0	0	10	18.53	17	0.630	–	–	–	–	–	–	–	–
2012	Toronto Rock	6	342:15	5	1	61	10.69	184	0.751	2	112:55	1	1	20	10.63	58	0.744
2013	Toronto Rock	16	905:00	10	5	160	10.61	604	0.791	1	53:24	0	1	17	19.10	33	0.660
2014	Toronto Rock	15	806:21	6	8	165	12.28	542	0.767	–	–	–	–	–	–	–	–
2015	Toronto Rock	8	432:52	6	2	70	9.70	285	0.803	1	21:40	0	0	3	8.31	16	0.842
2016	Toronto Rock	13	719:13	5	7	133	11.10	480	0.783	–	–	–	–	–	–	–	–
2017	Toronto Rock	18	1,019:56	8	8	184	10.82	631	0.774	2	62:30	0	1	12	11.52	38	0.760
2018	Toronto Rock	18	1,016:08	8	9	197	11.63	650	0.767	–	–	–	–	–	–	–	–
2019	Toronto Rock	18	1,028:03	12	6	201	11.73	675	0.771	2	119:59	1	1	25	12.50	80	0.762
2020	Toronto Rock	11	656:33	7	4	103	9.41	458	0.816	–	–	–	–	–	–	–	–
2022	Toronto Rock	18	1,007:22	13	3	152	9.05	618	0.803	3	182:45	1	2	41	13.46	113	0.734
2023	Toronto Rock	18	1,057:17	13	5	159	9.02	655	0.805	3	151:18	1	2	36	14.28	81	0.692
		167	9,104:37	94	59	1,606	10.58	5,857	0.785	14	704:31	4	8	154	13.12	419	0.731
Career Total:		181	9,809:08	98	67	1,760	10.77	6,276	0.781								

GP–Games played;Min–Minutes played;W–Wins;L–Losses;GA–Goals against;GAA–Goals against average;Sv–Number of saves;Sv %–Save percentage;
