= Josh Byrne =

Canadian lacrosse player (born 1994)

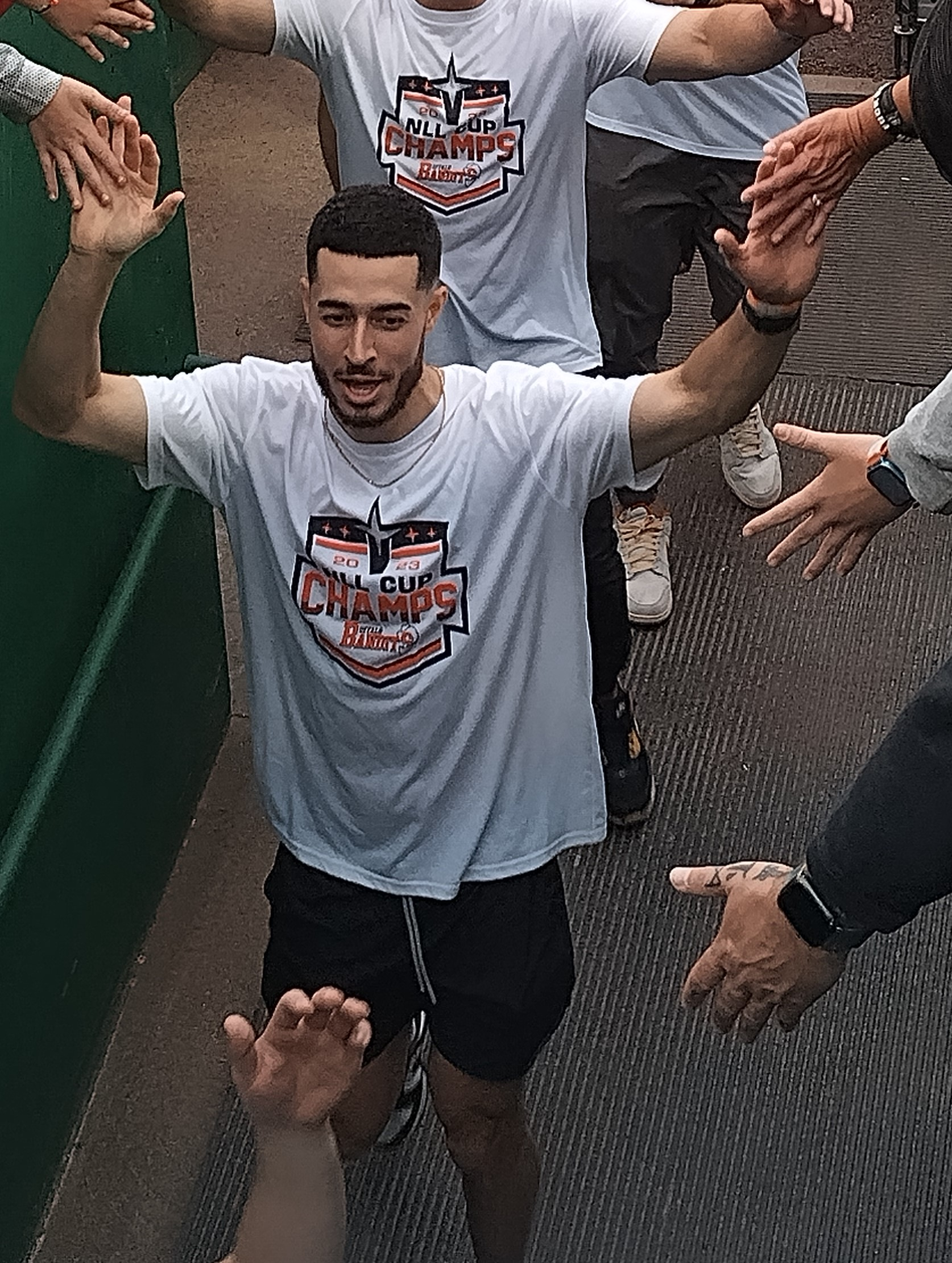
- Byrne with the Buffalo Bandits in 2023

Personal information
- Nationality: Canadian
- Born: April 15, 1994 (age 32) New Westminster, British Columbia, Canada
- Height: 6 ft 3 in (191 cm)

Sport
- Position: Forward (box), Attack (field)
- Shoots: Left
- NCAA team: Hofstra (2017)
- NLL draft: 1st overall, 2017; Buffalo Bandits
- NLL team: Buffalo Bandits
- MLL draft: 19th overall, 2017; Chesapeake Bayhawks
- MLL teams: Chesapeake Bayhawks
- PLL team: Chaos LC
- Pro career: 2017–

Career highlights
- MLL Rookie of the Year (2017); PLL champion (2021); 3× PLL All-Star (2019, 2021, 2023); PLL All-Pro (2020); 3× NLL champion (2023, 2024, 2025); NLL MVP (2024); NLL Finals MVP (2024); NLL Offensive Player of the Year (2024); First-team All-NLL (2024)
Medal record
Representing Canada
Men's field lacrosse
World Lacrosse Championship
Runner-up	2018 Netanya
Runner-up	2023 San Diego
Men's lacrosse sixes
World Games
Winner	2022 Birmingham
Men's box lacrosse
World Lacrosse Box Championships
Winner	2024 Utica

Josh Byrne (born April 15, 1994) is a Canadian professional lacrosse player for the Buffalo Bandits of the National Lacrosse League and Six Nations Chiefs of Major Series Lacrosse. He has won a championship with each team, with the Chaos in 2021, and with the Bandits in 2023, 2024 and 2025. He won the 2024 NLL MVP award and was also named the Finals MVP.

== Early life ==
Born in New Westminster, British Columbia to an Irish father and Trinidadian mother, Byrne attended New Westminster Secondary School and played junior lacrosse for his hometown New Westminster Salmonbellies of the BC Junior A Lacrosse League. Byrne played collegiately at ASA College and Nassau Community College. From 2016 to 2017, he played at Hofstra University, where he scored 71 goals and tallied 111 points in 29 games.

== Professional career ==
Byrne was taken first overall in the 2016 Western Lacrosse Association draft by the Burnaby Lakers. In 16 career regular season games with Burnaby, he tallied 12 goals and 33 assists.

Byrne was drafted first overall in the 2017 NLL Entry Draft by the Buffalo Bandits. With the Bandits, Byrne reached the NLL Cup Finals in 2019 and 2022, and won the NLL Cup in 2023, 2024, and 2025.

In the field game, Byrne was drafted 19th overall by the Chesapeake Bayhawks in the 2017 Major League Lacrosse draft. He played for Chesapeake in 2017 and 2018. Upon the foundation of the Premier Lacrosse League in 2019, Byrne joined Chaos Lacrosse Club, where he helped his team to PLL Championship game appearances in 2020 and 2022, and the league championship in 2021.

In April 2022, Byrne decided to leave Chaos and the PLL, opting instead to play for Six Nations in MSL, following several Bandits and Chaos teammates who opted to play box instead of PLL, the dismissal of Chaos head coach Andy Towers, and physical and mental health concerns.

== Personal life ==
Byrne hosts a podcast, The Dhane and Josh Show, with Bandits and Chaos teammate Dhane Smith. Both Byrne and Smith, who are Black Canadians, have supported the Black Lives Matter movement.

== Statistics ==
=== NLL ===
Josh Byrne		Regular season									Playoffs								
Season	Team	GP	G	A	Pts	LB	PIM	Pts/GP	LB/GP	PIM/GP	GP	G	A	Pts	LB	PIM	Pts/GP	LB/GP	PIM/GP
2018	Buffalo Bandits	18	26	37	63	72	9	3.50	4.00	0.50	–	–	–	–	–	–	–	–	–
2019	Buffalo Bandits	9	13	29	42	33	2	4.67	3.67	0.22	4	3	7	10	15	2	2.50	3.75	0.50
2020	Buffalo Bandits	11	29	26	55	52	7	5.00	4.73	0.64	–	–	–	–	–	–	–	–	–
2022	Buffalo Bandits	18	37	62	99	74	12	5.50	4.11	0.67	6	14	24	38	26	0	6.33	4.33	0.00
2023	Buffalo Bandits	15	43	50	93	66	12	6.20	4.40	0.80	4	15	18	33	18	6	8.25	4.50	1.50
2024	Buffalo Bandits	18	53	82	135	75	14	7.50	4.17	0.78	5	12	22	34	25	0	6.80	5.00	0.00
2025	Buffalo Bandits	18	44	90	134	88	18	7.44	4.89	1.00	6	7	22	29	22	10	4.83	3.67	1.67
2026	Buffalo Bandits	18	36	77	113	64	8	6.28	3.56	0.44	1	1	5	6	5	0	6.00	5.00	0.00
		125	281	453	734	524	82	5.87	4.19	0.66	26	52	98	150	111	18	5.77	4.27	0.69
Career Total:		151	333	551	884	635	100	5.85	4.21	0.66									

GP–Games played; G–Goals; A–Assists; Pts–Points; LB–Loose balls; PIM–Penalty minutes; Pts/GP–Points per games played; LB/GP–Loose balls per games played; PIM/GP–Penalty minutes per games played.

=== MLL ===
Season	Team	Regular season											Playoffs										
Season	Team	GP	G	2PG	A	Pts	Sh	GB	Pen	PIM	FOW	FOA	GP	G	2PG	A	Pts	Sh	GB	Pen	PIM	FOW	FOA
2017	Chesapeake Bayhawks	9	39	0	7	46	92	17	0	0	0	0	–	–	–	–	–	–	–	–	–	–	–
2018	Chesapeake Bayhawks	9	22	0	8	30	65	11	0	2	0	0	1	2	0	1	3	7	1	0	0.5	0	0
		18	61	0	15	76	157	28	0	2	0	0	1	2	0	1	3	7	1	0	0.5	0	0
Career total:		19	63	0	16	79	164	29	0	2.5	0	0											

GP–Games played; G–Goals; 2PG–2-point goals; A–Assists; Pts–Points; Sh–Shots; GB–Ground balls; Pen–Penalties; PIM–Penalty minutes; FOW–Faceoffs won; FOA–Faceoffs attempted

=== PLL ===
Season	Team	Regular season											Playoffs										
Season	Team	GP	G	2PG	A	Pts	Sh	GB	Pen	PIM	FOW	FOA	GP	G	2PG	A	Pts	Sh	GB	Pen	PIM	FOW	FOA
2019	Chaos	8	17	0	8	25	39	11	0	1	0	0	2	2	0	2	4	3	1	0	0	0	0
2020	Chaos	7	13	0	7	20	44	8	2	1	0	0	–	–	–	–	–	–	–	–	–	–	–
2021	Chaos	9	17	0	12	29	67	19	1	0.5	0	0	3	7	0	4	11	27	4	0	0	0	0
2022	Chaos	7	15	0	5	20	53	9	2	1.5	0	0	3	6	0	4	10	24	5	1	1	0	0
2023	Chaos	6	15	0	6	21	46	11	0	0	0	0	1	3	0	1	4	11	1	0	0	0	0
2024	Carolina Chaos	9	11	0	18	29	50	13	2	1	0	0	2	2	0	1	3	11	2	1	1	0	0
		46	88	0	56	144	299	71	7	5	0	0	11	20	0	12	32	65	13	2	2	0	0
Career total:		57	108	0	68	176	364	84	9	7	0	0											

GP–Games played; G–Goals; 2PG–2-point goals; A–Assists; Pts–Points; Sh–Shots; GB–Ground balls; Pen–Penalties; PIM–Penalty minutes; FOW–Faceoffs won; FOA–Faceoffs attempted

== Awards and achievements ==
Preceded by Christian Del Bianco	NLL Most Valuable Player; 2024	Succeeded by Connor Fields
