= Christian Del Bianco =

Canadian professional lacrosse player

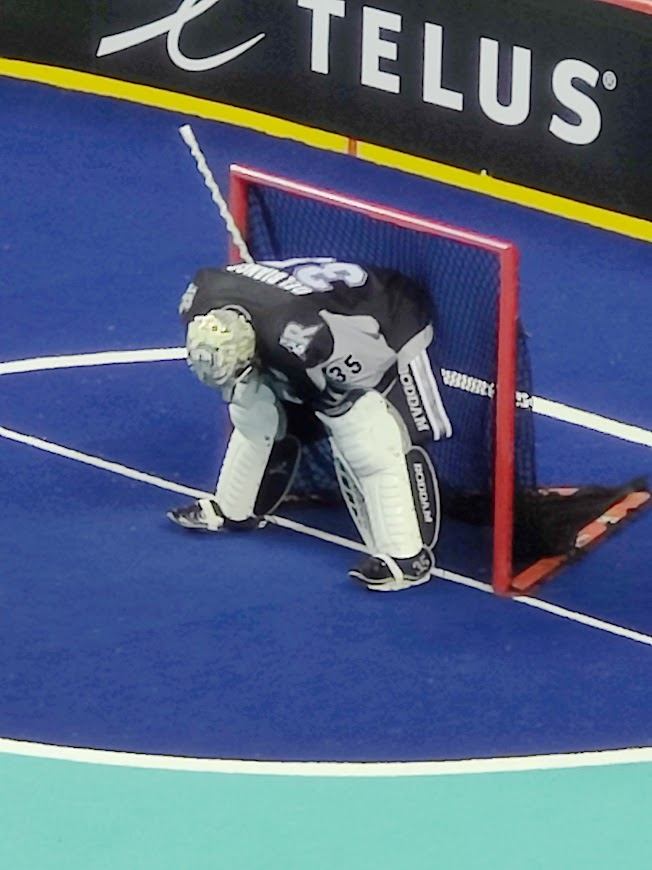
- Del Bianco with the Calgary Roughnecks in 2023

Personal information
- Nationality: Canadian
- Born: August 31, 1997 (age 28) Coquitlam, British Columbia, Canada
- Height: 5 ft 10 in (178 cm)
- Weight: 205 lb (93 kg; 14 st 9 lb)

Sport
- Position: Goaltender
- Shoots: Right
- NLL draft: 15th overall, 2015; Calgary Roughnecks
- NLL team Former teams: Vancouver Warriors; Calgary Roughnecks
- Pro career: 2016–

Career highlights
- NLL: NLL Season MVP (2023); NLL Goaltender of the Year (2023); 1x First Team All-NLL (2023); Single season record for minutes played by a goaltender (1,080:19, 2023)

Christian Del Bianco (born August 31, 1997) is a Canadian professional box lacrosse goaltender for the Vancouver Warriors of the National Lacrosse League (NLL). Drafted 15th overall in the second round in the 2015 NLL Entry Draft, he has played most of his career in Calgary.

Del Bianco announced via social media on July 23, 2024 that he chose not to re-sign with Calgary to focus on off-floor endeavors. Calgary retained his rights under the CBA by using their "Franchise Tag" on him before they traded him to the Vancouver Warriors at the trade deadline of the 2025 season on March 10, 2025.

Del Bianco was named to the NLL All-League 2nd Team in 2019. Heading into the 2023 NLL season, Inside Lacrosse named Del Bianco the #5 best goalie in the NLL.

Del Bianco was named the 2023 NLL Goalie of the Year and MVP, having set a league record for most minutes played by a goalie in a season, and leading the Roughnecks to their highest win total in club history. Del Bianco is just the second goalie to win NLL MVP, after Steve Dietrich in 2006, and the third non-forward to win the award, following Dietrich and transition player Jeff Shattler in 2011.

== Career statistics ==
		Regular Season								Playoffs							
Season	Team	GP	Min	W	L	GA	GAA	Sv	Sv %	GP	Min	W	L	GA	GAA	Sv	Sv %
2016	Calgary	1	0:19	0	0	0	0.00	0	0.000	–	–	–	–	–	–	–	–
2017	Calgary	18	192:21	0	3	45	14.04	110	0.710	–	–	–	–	–	–	–	–
2018	Calgary	18	788:34	7	6	138	10.50	530	0.793	2	119:59	1	1	26	13.00	83	0.761
2019	Calgary	18	1,074:44	10	8	200	11.17	716	0.782	4	241:12	4	0	35	8.71	181	0.838
2020	Calgary	10	608:51	5	5	111	10.94	458	0.805	–	–	–	–	–	–	–	–
2022	Calgary	18	1,070:28	10	8	197	11.04	666	0.772	1	59:59	0	1	15	15.00	37	0.712
2023	Calgary	18	1,080:19	13	5	167	9.28	712	0.810	4	239:59	2	2	37	9.25	139	0.790
2024	Calgary	18	1,081:56	8	10	192	10.65	748	0.796	–	–	–	–	–	–	–	–
2025	Vancouver	6	355:50	6	0	52	8.77	238	0.821	3	178:57	1	2	30	10.06	117	0.796
		125	6,253:22	59	45	1,102	10.57	4,178	0.791	14	840:06	8	6	143	10.21	557	0.796
Career Total:		139	7,093:28	67	51	1,245	10.53	4,735	0.792								

GP–Games played;Min–Minutes played;W–Wins;L–Losses;GA–Goals against;GAA–Goals against average;Sv–Number of saves;Sv %–Save percentage;

== Awards and achievements ==
Preceded by Dhane Smith	NLL Most Valuable Player; 2023	Succeeded by Josh Byrne
