= Chris Boushy =

South African-Canadian lacrosse player (born 1997)

Personal information
- Nationality: South African; Canadian

Sport
- NLL draft: 31st overall, 2017; Saskatchewan Rush
- NLL team Former teams: Toronto Rock; Calgary Roughnecks; Rochester Knighthawks; Halifax Thunderbirds
- Pro career: 2018–

Career highlights
- NLL: 1x Champion (2026)

Chris Boushy (born July 28, 1997) is a South African-Canadian lacrosse player who currently plays as a forward for the Toronto Rock, having previously played for the Calgary Roughnecks, Rochester Knighthawks, and Halifax Thunderbirds. He is also the president of the South Africa Lacrosse Association, and helped admit them into World Lacrosse in 2021.

== Early life ==
Boushy and his brother Michael were born in Johannesburg, South Africa to a Canadian father and German born-South African mother. The family moved to Canada when Chris was five years old, and afterwards, he picked up hockey and lacrosse, ultimately deciding to focus on lacrosse in Grade 11. He played Junior B for the Halton Hills Bulldogs, before eventually moving to the Burlington Chiefs of the OJLL. He would also enroll at Queen's University at Kingston, which allowed him to enter the NLL draft while still playing college lacrosse in Canada.

== NLL career ==
Boushy was drafted 31st overall by the Saskatchewan Rush in 2017, but failed to make their roster and was released. After another failed training camp with the Buffalo Bandits, Boushy would be signed by the Calgary Roughnecks, making his NLL debut on December 15, 2018, in a loss to the Vancouver Warriors, becoming the NLL's first South African-born player. Boushy would be traded to the Rochester Knighthawks on March 7, 2019, in exchange for a fourth-round pick in the 2020 NLL Entry Draft, and following the season, the Knighthawks organization relocated and became the Halifax Thunderbirds. Boushy would continue his growth, setting career highs in points in the 2021–22 and 2022–23 seasons before being traded to the Toronto Rock on September 18, 2023, in exchange for their first-round pick in the 2026 NLL Entry Draft. Boushy would score a career high 40 goals in the 2024–25 season, and would sign a 2-year extension in Toronto in October 2025.

== Stats ==
Chris Boushy		Regular season									Playoffs								
Season	Team	GP	G	A	Pts	LB	PIM	Pts/GP	LB/GP	PIM/GP	GP	G	A	Pts	LB	PIM	Pts/GP	LB/GP	PIM/GP
2019	Calgary Roughnecks	8	8	6	14	20	2	1.75	2.50	0.25	–	–	–	–	–	–	–	–	–
2019	Rochester Knighthawks	8	14	8	22	36	6	2.75	4.50	0.75	–	–	–	–	–	–	–	–	–
2020	Halifax Thunderbirds	4	1	6	7	14	2	1.75	3.50	0.50	–	–	–	–	–	–	–	–	–
2022	Halifax Thunderbirds	17	26	21	47	44	13	2.76	2.59	0.76	1	0	1	1	2	0	1.00	2.00	0.00
2023	Halifax Thunderbirds	17	38	20	58	56	26	3.41	3.29	1.53	1	3	3	6	1	7	6.00	1.00	7.00
2024	Toronto Rock	16	31	28	59	46	30	3.69	2.88	1.88	3	3	4	7	6	2	2.33	2.00	0.67
2025	Toronto Rock	18	40	32	72	62	33	4.00	3.44	1.83	–	–	–	–	–	–	–	–	–
2026	Toronto Rock	18	28	18	46	44	6	2.56	2.44	0.33	6	15	5	20	10	2	3.33	1.67	0.33
		106	186	139	325	322	118	3.07	3.04	1.11	11	21	13	34	19	11	3.09	1.73	1.00
Career Total:		117	207	152	359	341	129	3.07	2.91	1.10									

GP–Games played; G–Goals; A–Assists; Pts–Points; LB–Loose balls; PIM–Penalty minutes; Pts/GP–Points per games played; LB/GP–Loose balls per games played; PIM/GP–Penalty minutes per games played.

== South African Lacrosse Association ==
Boushy established the South African Lacrosse Association in 2020, with the goal of admitting them to World Lacrosse, and future establishment of a national team. South Africa would be welcomed as the 69th full member of World Lacrosse in 2021, and the fourth from Africa, following Ghana, Uganda, and Kenya.

== International career ==
Boushy has represented Germany on the international level at the 2026 European Box Lacrosse and 2026 European Sixes Lacrosse Championships.
