= Jesse King (lacrosse) =

Canadian lacrosse player (born 1992)

Personal information
- Nationality: Canadian
- Born: July 12, 1992 (age 33) Victoria, British Columbia, Canada
- Height: 6 ft 3 in (191 cm)
- Weight: 220 lb (100 kg; 15 st 10 lb)

Sport
- Position: Forward (box), Midfield (field)
- Shoots: Left
- NCAA team: Ohio State (2015)
- NLL draft: 3rd overall, 2015; Georgia Swarm
- NLL team Former teams: Vancouver Warriors; Calgary Roughnecks, Georgia Swarm
- MLL draft: 6th overall, 2015; Rochester Rattlers
- MLL teams: Rochester Rattlers
- PLL teams: Chrome LC
- Pro career: 2016–

Jesse King (born July 12, 1992) is a Canadian professional lacrosse player who plays for the Vancouver Warriors in the National Lacrosse League. He has previously played for the Georgia Swarm and the Calgary Roughnecks in the NLL, captaining the latter, and for the Rochester Rattlers in the Major League Lacrosse.

King was named to the 2016 NLL All-Rookie Team. In college, he played for the Ohio State Buckeyes.

== Statistics ==
=== NLL ===
Jesse King		Regular season									Playoffs								
Season	Team	GP	G	A	Pts	LB	PIM	Pts/GP	LB/GP	PIM/GP	GP	G	A	Pts	LB	PIM	Pts/GP	LB/GP	PIM/GP
2016	Georgia Swarm	17	22	55	77	83	11	4.53	4.88	0.65	1	1	2	3	6	0	3.00	6.00	0.00
2018	Georgia Swarm	18	28	41	69	69	7	3.83	3.83	0.39	1	0	0	0	3	0	0.00	3.00	0.00
2019	Calgary Roughnecks	2	3	6	9	8	0	4.50	4.00	0.00	4	6	11	17	10	2	4.25	2.50	0.50
2020	Calgary Roughnecks	4	6	9	15	18	4	3.75	4.50	1.00	–	–	–	–	–	–	–	–	–
2022	Calgary Roughnecks	18	29	66	95	104	6	5.28	5.78	0.33	1	3	3	6	5	0	6.00	5.00	0.00
2023	Calgary Roughnecks	18	42	58	100	66	14	5.56	3.67	0.78	4	6	12	18	14	4	4.50	3.50	1.00
2024	Calgary Roughnecks	18	32	73	105	85	16	5.83	4.72	0.89	–	–	–	–	–	–	–	–	–
2025	Calgary Roughnecks	18	30	76	106	85	10	5.89	4.72	0.56	1	2	3	5	3	0	5.00	3.00	0.00
		113	192	384	576	518	68	5.10	4.58	0.60	12	18	31	49	41	6	4.08	3.42	0.50
Career Total:		125	210	415	625	559	74	5.00	4.47	0.59									

GP–Games played; G–Goals; A–Assists; Pts–Points; LB–Loose balls; PIM–Penalty minutes; Pts/GP–Points per games played; LB/GP–Loose balls per games played; PIM/GP–Penalty minutes per games played.

=== MLL ===
Season	Team	Regular season											Playoffs										
Season	Team	GP	G	2PG	A	Pts	Sh	GB	Pen	PIM	FOW	FOA	GP	G	2PG	A	Pts	Sh	GB	Pen	PIM	FOW	FOA
2016	Rochester Rattlers	10	25	0	10	35	51	18	0	2	0	0	–	–	–	–	–	–	–	–	–	–	–
		10	25	0	10	35	51	18	0	2	0	0	0	0	0	0	0	0	0	0	0	0	0
Career total:		10	25	0	10	35	51	18	0	2	0	0											

GP–Games played; G–Goals; 2PG–2-point goals; A–Assists; Pts–Points; Sh–Shots; GB–Ground balls; Pen–Penalties; PIM–Penalty minutes; FOW–Faceoffs won; FOA–Faceoffs attempted

=== PLL ===
Season	Team	Regular season											Playoffs										
Season	Team	GP	G	2PG	A	Pts	Sh	GB	Pen	PIM	FOW	FOA	GP	G	2PG	A	Pts	Sh	GB	Pen	PIM	FOW	FOA
2020	Chrome	5	8	0	2	10	19	3	0	0	0	0	–	–	–	–	–	–	–	–	–	–	–
2023	Chrome	6	3	0	5	8	12	2	1	0.5	0	0	–	–	–	–	–	–	–	–	–	–	–
		11	11	0	7	18	31	5	1	0.5	0	0	0	0	0	0	0	0	0	0	0	0	0
Career total:		11	11	0	7	18	31	5	1	0.5	0	0											

GP–Games played; G–Goals; 2PG–2-point goals; A–Assists; Pts–Points; Sh–Shots; GB–Ground balls; Pen–Penalties; PIM–Penalty minutes; FOW–Faceoffs won; FOA–Faceoffs attempted
