= List of current NLL team rosters =

The following is a list of current National Lacrosse League (NLL) team rosters. Each National Lacrosse League team may carry twenty-three players on their active roster. In addition, teams may keep two players on their practice team. Also, teams may place players on a number of restricted lists, such as "injured reserve," "unable to play," "hold out," and "protected."

For each game, teams are allowed to dress a total of eighteen players. This must include two goaltenders and sixteen runners.

Rosters are filled by a combination of drafts, free agency, and trades. Each year, the league holds an entry draft with players who are 21 years of age, or if less than 21 years of age, has used or given up all NCAA or NAIA eligibility. Also, in years in which a new team is introduced the league holds an expansion draft, or in some years in which a team is ceasing operations a dispersal draft is held.

The league has an annual trade deadline, which typically falls right before the final month of the season. After this deadline no players exchanged may join the new team on its playoff roster.

There are two difference types of free agency in the National Lacrosse League, restricted and unrestricted. In order to qualify for restricted free agency players must have played in the league for three seasons and participated in twenty-three regular season games. A restricted free agent's club may sign the player to a qualifying offer prior to the deadline, or match any offer made by any other club after the deadline in order to retain the players services. An unrestricted free agent (‡) is any player who has reached thirty-two years of age and has played six seasons in the league. An unrestricted free agent may be "franchised" by their club. A franchise player (†), limited to two per club, earns an automatic twenty-percent above the league's maximum salary. If an unrestricted free agent is not franchised, then he may sign with any team in the league.

== Eastern Division ==
=== Buffalo Bandits ===
Buffalo Bandits roster
Active (21-man) roster		Inactive roster	Coaches
Goaltenders: 33 (Canada) Zach Higgins; 48 (Canada) Matt Vinc; Defensemen: 7 (Canada) Bryce Sweeting; 12 (Canada) Mitch de Snoo; 19 (Canada) Matthew Bennett; 20 (Canada) Nick Weiss; 21 (Canada) Justin Martin; 23 (Canada) Steve Priolo (C); 25 (Canada) Matt Spanger; 94 (Canada) Ryan Wagner	Forwards: 22 (Canada) Josh Byrne; 45 (Canada) Corey Small; 78 (Canada) Jordan Durston; 91 (Canada) Thomas Hoggarth; 92 (Canada) Dhane Smith; 95 (Canada) Chase Fraser; Transition: 4 (Canada) Ian MacKay; 8 (Canada) Kevin Brownell; 37 (Canada) Ethan O’Connor; 81 (Canada) Matt Gilray	Practice squad: (Canada) Dallas Bridle; 71 (Canada) Zach Herreweyers; (Republic of Ireland) Devlin Shanahan; Injured reserve: 9 (Canada) Mark Steenhuis; (Canada) Jon Harnett	Head coach: John Tavares; Assistant coaches: Anthony Cosmo; Dave Pym; Rusty Kruger; Equipment Manager: Ted Cordingley; Legend: * Suspended list; (C) Captain; (A) Alternate captain; Roster updated 2019-01-06; NLL Transactions

=== Georgia Swarm ===
Georgia Swarm roster
Active (21-man) roster		Inactive roster	Coaches
Goaltenders: 29 (Canada) Kevin Orleman; 30 (Canada) Mike Poulin; Defensemen: 10 (Canada) Alex Crepinsek; 33 (United States) Matt Dunn; 45 (Canada) Jason Noble (A); 31 (United States) John Ranagan; 13 (Canada) Connor Sellars; 25 (Canada) Leo Stouros; 27 (Canada) Adam Wiedemann	Forwards: 21 (Haudenosaunee) Brendan Bomberry; 9 (Canada) Holden Cattoni; 32 (Canada) Shayne Jackson (A); 83 (Haudenosaunee) Randy Staats; 22 (Haudenosaunee) Jerome Thompson; 4 (Haudenosaunee) Lyle Thompson; 2 (Haudenosaunee) Miles Thompson; 5 (Canada) Joel Tinney; Transition: 44 (Canada) Chad Tutton; 55 (Canada) Bryan Cole; 24 (Canada) Jordan MacIntosh (C); 28 (Haudenosaunee) Zed Williams	Practice squad: 1 (Germany) Craig Wende; 17 (Canada) Tyler Ferriera; 34 (Canada) Steven Orleman; 38 (Haudenosaunee) LeRoy Halftown	Head coach: Ed Comeau; Assistant coaches: Sean Ferris; Dan Ladouceur; Legend: * Suspended list; (C) Captain; (A) Alternate captain; Roster updated 2019-07-01; NLL Transactions

=== New England Black Wolves ===
New England Black Wolves roster
Active (21-man) roster		Inactive roster	Coaches
Goaltenders: 29 (Canada) Alex Buque; 30 (Canada) Doug Jamieson; Defensemen: 10 (Haudenosaunee) Adam Bomberry; 4 (Canada) David Brock; 24 (Canada) Joel Coyle; 8 (United States) Greg Downing; 81 (Canada) Ryan Fournier; 13 (United States) Brett Manney (C); 26 (Canada) Jackson Nishimura; (Canada) Adam Perroni; 20 (Canada) Andrew Suitor	Forwards: 27 (United States) Kevin Buchanan; 22 (Canada) Nick Chaykowsky; 98 (Canada) Callum Crawford; 23 (Canada) Tyler Digby; 77 (United States) Dereck Downs; 14 (United States) Dave Emala; 83 (Canada) JP Kealey; 86 (Canada) Stephan Leblanc (A); 9 (Canada) Reilly O'Connor; Transition: 17 (Canada) Colton Watkinson	Practice squad: 5 (United States) Tal Bruno (D); (Haudenosaunee) Quinn Powless; 35 (Canada) Ethan Woods (G); Injured reserve: 33 (Canada) John LaFontaine (A)	Head coach {{{Head Coach}}} Legend: * Suspended list; (C) Captain; (A) Alternate captain; Roster updated 2019-02-07; NLL Transactions

=== Philadelphia Wings ===
Philadelphia Wings roster
Active (21-man) roster		Inactive roster	Coaches
Goaltenders: 31 (Canada) Zach Higgins; 36 (Canada) Brandon Miller; Defensemen: 29 (Canada) Ian Llord (A); 21 (Canada) Steph Charbonneau; 33 (Canada) Anthony Joaquim; 51 (Canada) Nate Wade; 12 (Canada) Liam Patten; 2 (Canada) Eric Shewell; 94 (Canada) Ryan Wagner; 16 (Canada) Nick Finlay; 41 (Canada) Alex Pace; 55 (United States) Liam Byrnes	Forwards: 1 (United States) Matt Rambo; 10 (United States) Blaze Riorden; 11 (Canada) Brett Hickey; 21 (Canada) Kevin Crowley (A); 23 (Canada) Corey Vitarelli; 27 (Canada) Josh Currier; 72 (United States) Kevin Buchanan; Transition: 9 (United States) Trevor Baptiste; 46 (Canada) Kiel Matisz (C); 26 (United States) Isaiah Davis-Allen	Practice squad: -- (United States) Kyle Marr; -- (United States) Austin Pifani; -- (Canada) Matt Marinier; 93 (Canada) Daryl Waud	Head coach: Paul Day; Assistant coaches: Landon Miller; Legend: * Suspended list; (C) Captain; (A) Alternate captain; Roster updated 2022-05-18; NLL Transactions

=== Rochester Knighthawks ===
Rochester Knighthawks roster
Active (21-man) roster		Inactive roster	Coaches
Goaltenders: 76 (Haudenosaunee) Warren Hill; 55 (Haudenosaunee) Angus Goodleaf; Defensemen: 25 (Canada) James Barclay; 37 (Canada) Scott Campbell (C); 2 (Canada) Paul Dawson (A); 12 (Haudenosaunee) Oran Horn; 4 (Canada) Graeme Hossack (A); 29 (Canada) Ian Llord; 45 (Canada) Luc Magnan; 73 (Haudenosaunee) Leland Powless; 9 (Canada) Darryl Robertson; 20 (Canada) Luke Van Schepen; 21 (Canada) Eric Shewell; 18 (Canada) Jake Withers	Forwards: 3 (Canada) Eric Fannell; 47 (Haudenosaunee) Kyle Jackson; 88 (Haudenosaunee) Cody Jamieson (A); 77 (Haudenosaunee) Quinn Powless; 15 (United States) Joe Resetarits; 96 (Canada) Dylan Riley; 14 (Canada) Pat Saunders; 11 (Canada) Austin Shanks; 23 (Canada) Cory Vitarelli; Transition: 10 (Canada) Brad Gillies	Practice squad: 7 (Canada) Cam Milligan; Injured reserve: 79 (Haudenosaunee) Sid Smith; Unable to play: 13 (Canada) Brandon Robinson	Head coach {{{Head Coach}}} Legend: * Suspended list; (C) Captain; (A) Alternate captain; Roster updated 2019-01-18; NLL Transactions

=== Toronto Rock ===
Toronto Rock roster
Active (21-man) roster		Inactive roster	Coaches
Goaltenders: 1 (Canada) Riley Hutchcraft; 66 (Canada) Nick Rose; Defensemen: 4 (Canada) David Brock; 71 (Canada) Sheldon Burns; 13 (Canada) Scott Dominey; 91 (Canada) Bill Hostrawser (A); 47 (Canada) Adam Jay; 33 (Canada) Josh Jubenville; 20 (Canada) Bradley Kri (A); 11 (Canada) Taylor Stuart; 15 (Canada) Alex Tulett	Forwards: 25 (Canada) Dan Craig; 6 (Canada) Dan Dawson; 17 (Canada) Aaron Forster; 10 (Canada) Rob Hellyer (A); 2 (Canada) Zach Manns; 18 (Haudenosaunee) Johnny Powless; 97 (Canada) Reid Reinholdt; 26 (United States) Tom Schreiber (A); Transition: 23 (Canada) Challen Rogers (C)	Practice squad: 9 (Canada) Mitchell Gustavsen (D); 47 (Canada) Adam Jay (D); 14 (Canada) Brad Lyons (D); 13 (Canada) Scott Dominey (T); Injured reserve: 16 (Canada) Adam Jones (F); 61 (Canada) Brandon Slade (D); 93 (Canada) Latrell Harris (D); Holdout: 2 (Canada) AJ Kluck; Protected list: 99 (United States) Paul Rabil (T); Unable to play: 3 (Canada) Brock Sorensen	Head coach: Matt Sawyer; Assistant coaches: Bruce Codd; Blaine Manning; Brandon Miller; Legend: * Suspended list; (C) Captain; (A) Alternate captain; Roster updated 2019-03-13; NLL Transactions

== Western Division ==
=== Calgary Roughnecks ===
Calgary Roughnecks roster
Active (21-man) roster		Inactive roster	Coaches
Goaltenders: 35 (Canada) Christian Del Bianco; 00 (Canada) Tyler Richards; Defensemen: 16 (Canada) Mike Carnegie; 11 (Canada) Greg Harnett (A); 81 (Canada) Anthony Kalinich; 68 (Canada) Tyler Pace; 13 (Canada) Eli Salama	Forwards: 21 (Canada) Chris Boushy; 8 (Canada) Carter Dickson; 44 (Canada) Dane Dobbie (A); 18 (Canada) Rhys Duch; 89 (Canada) Riley Loewen; 88 (Canada) Ryan Martel; 68 (Canada) Tyler Pace; 26 (Canada) Dan Taylor; Transition: 94 (Canada) Tyson Bell; 7 (Canada) Tyler Burton; 2 (Canada) Reece Callies; 25 (Canada) Chad Cummings; 77 (Canada) Zach Currier; 3 (Canada) Dan MacRae (C); 22 (Canada) Shane Simpson; 55 (Canada) Mitch Wilde	Practice squad: 41 (Canada) Bob Snider; 47 (Canada) Sean Tyrrell; Injured reserve: 10 (Canada) Curtis Manning; 19 (Canada) Jesse King; Protected list: 14 (Canada) Wesley Berg; 17 (Canada) Curtis Dickson (A)	Head coach: Curt Malawsky; Assistant coaches: Bob McMahon; Rob Williams; Legend: * Suspended list; (C) Captain; (A) Alternate captain; updated 2017-12-09; NLL Transactions

=== Colorado Mammoth ===
Colorado Mammoth roster
Active (21-man) roster		Inactive roster	Coaches
Goaltenders: 39 (Canada) Steve Fryer; 45 (Canada) Dillon Ward; Defensemen: 8 (United States) Brent Adams; 37 (Canada) Dan Coates (C); 82 (Canada) Joey Cupido (A); 27 (Canada) Scott Carnegie; 3 (United States) Tim Edwards; 94 (Canada) Julian Garritano; 23 (Canada) Jordan Gilles; 18 (Canada) Robert Hope (A); 86 (Canada) John Lintz; 25 (Canada) Brad Self; 4 (Canada) Josh Sullivan; 11 (Canada) Taylor Stuart	Forwards: 7 (Canada) Ryan Benesch; 28 (Canada) Stephen Keogh; 16 (Canada) Ryan Lee; 51 (Canada) Eli McLaughlin; 35 (Canada) Jeremy Noble; 20 (Canada) Jacob Ruest; 17 (Canada) Chris Wardle	Practice squad: 42 (Canada) Rowan Kelly; 67 (Canada) Kyle Killen; 54 (Canada) Steven Lee; 71 (Canada) Jeff Wittig	Head coach: Pat Coyle; Assistant coaches: Andrew McBride; Shawn Williams; Legend: * Suspended list; (C) Captain; (A) Alternate captain; Roster updated 2018-01-02; NLL Transactions

=== San Diego Seals ===
San Diego Seals roster
Active (21-man) roster		Inactive roster	Coaches
Goaltenders: 39 (Canada) Nick Damude; 92 (England) Frank Scigliano; Defensemen: 44 (Canada) Graydon Bradley; 11 (United States) Mark Glicini; 25 (United States) Eli Gobrecht; 19 (Canada) Cam Holding (A); 3 (Canada) Garrett McIntosh; 17 (Canada) Brodie Merrill (C); 7 (Canada) Tor Reinholdt; 12 (Canada) Matt Sykes	Forwards: 14 (Canada) Wesley Berg; 91 (Canada) Kyle Buchanan (A); 5 (United States) Connor Fields; 88 (Canada) Zack Greer; 81 (Canada) Connor Kearnan; 22 (Canada) Evan Messenger; 45 (Canada) Jeremy Noble; 21 (Canada) Casey Jackson; 83 (Haudenosaunee) Austin Staats; Transition: 2 (Canada) Drew Belgrave; 63 (Canada) Brandon Clelland	Practice squad: 77 (United States) Jules Heningburg; 30 (Canada) Johnny Pearson; 96 (Canada) Dylan Riley	Head coach: Patrick Merrill; Assistant coaches: Josh Sanderson; Bill Greer; Legend: * Suspended list; (C) Captain; (A) Alternate captain; Roster updated 2019-01-18; NLL Transactions

=== Saskatchewan Rush ===
Saskatchewan Rush roster
Active (21-man) roster		Inactive roster	Coaches
Goaltenders: 31 (Canada) Adam Shute; 35 (Canada) Evan Kirk; Defensemen: 13 (Canada) Jeff Cornwall; 20 (Canada) Travis Cornwall; 24 (Canada) Ryan Dilks (A); 70 (Canada) Holden Garlent; 94 (Canada) Matt Hossack; 65 (Canada) Ryan McLean; 8 (Canada) Mike Messenger; 53 (Canada) Justin Robinson; 4 (Canada) Kyle Rubisch (A)	Forwards: 17 (Canada) Robert Church; 32 (Canada) Matthew Dinsdale; 15 (Canada) Ryan Keenan; 9 (Canada) Curtis Knight; 42 (Canada) Mark Matthews (A); 90 (Canada) Ben McIntosh (A); 11 (Canada) Austin Murphy; 3 (Canada) Connor Robinson; 77 (Haudenosaunee) Jeff Shattler; Transition: 16 (Canada) Chris Corbeil (C); 61 (Canada) Nick Finlay; 19 (Canada) Jordi Jones-Smith; 74 (Haudenosaunee) Jeremy Thompson	Practice squad: 88 (Canada) Cameron Dunkerley (G); 12 (Canada) Zach Gould (F); 44 (Canada) Tanner Thomson (F); Protected list: 23 (Canada) Ryan Dilks; 13 (Canada) Jeff Cornwall	Head coach: Derek Keenan; Assistant coaches: Jeff McComb - Offensive Coach; Jimmy Quinlan - Defensive Coach; Legend: * Suspended list; (C) Captain; (A) Alternate captain; Roster updated 2019-04-18; NLL Transactions

=== Vancouver Warriors ===
Vancouver Warriors roster
Active (21-man) roster		Inactive roster	Coaches
Goaltenders: 00 (Canada) Alexis Buque; 39 (Canada) Steve Fryer; Defensemen: 27 (Canada) Owen Barker; 2 (Canada) Brett Mydske; 3 (Canada) Garrett McIntosh; 28 (Canada) Reid Bowering; 71 (Canada) Taylor Stuart; 81 (Canada) Anthony Kalinich; 7 (Canada) Tyler Codron; 39 (Canada) Tyrell Hamer-Jackson; 13 (Canada) Tyson Roe; 19 (Canada) Justin Salt; 42 (Canada) Derek Lloyd	Forwards: 45 (Canada) Keegan Bal; 14 (Canada) Brandon Goodwin; 16 (Canada) Mitch Jones; 89 (Canada) Riley Loewen; 11 (Scotland) Jordan McBride; 67 (Canada) Kyle Killen; 18 (Canada) Logan Schuss; 32 (Canada) Matthew Dinsdale; 8 (Canada) Adam Charalambides; 96 (Canada) Ryan Martel	Practice squad: 23 (Canada) Keegan Bell (F); 41 (Canada) Isaac Bot (D/T); 97 (Canada) Lyndon Bunio (F); 36 (Canada) Brody Harris (G)	Head coach: Chris Gill; Assistant coaches: Kaleb Toth; Curtis Hodgson; Legend: * Suspended list; (C) Captain; (A) Alternate captain; NLL Transactions
