= 2019 NLL season =

- League: National Lacrosse League
- Sport: Indoor lacrosse (box lacrosse)
- Duration: December 15, 2018 — May 25, 2019
- Games: 18
- Teams: 11
- TV partner: B/R Live

Draft
- Top draft pick: Austin Staats
- Picked by: San Diego Seals

Regular Season
- Top seed: Buffalo Bandits
- Season MVP: Dane Dobbie (Calgary Roughnecks)
- Top scorer: Dane Dobbie (Calgary Roughnecks)

Playoffs
- Finals champions: Calgary Roughnecks (3rd title)
- Runners-up: Buffalo Bandits
- Finals MVP: Dane Dobbie (Roughnecks)

NLL seasons
- ← 2018 season 2020 season →

The 2019 National Lacrosse League season, formally known as the 2018–2019 season, is the 33rd in the history of the NLL. It was originally scheduled to begin on December 1, 2018 and ending with the NLL final in late spring of 2019. This season is the inaugural season for the expansion teams San Diego Seals and Philadelphia Wings. This is also the final season for the Rochester Knighthawks under owner Curt Styres, as the team's operations are being relocated to Halifax for the 2019–20 season while Pegula Sports and Entertainment takes over the Knighthawks moniker with a new expansion team.

The Professional Lacrosse Players Association, who represents the NLL players, opted out of their seven-year collective bargaining agreement after the fifth season (2017–18) seeking a new deal. On November 15, 2018 the league announced that a counter-proposal submitted by the Professional Lacrosse Players Association was rejected. This came after the league suspended their Wednesday November 14 deadline to review the counter-proposal after the PLPA rejected the league's offer; the PLPA advised its members not to attend training camp and thus effectively went on strike. Subsequent to this the league announced that all games to be played in the first two weeks of the season (encompassing December 1 and 8 weekends) were cancelled. On November 24 the NLL and the PLPA came to an agreement on the CBA for 5 years, ending the labor dispute.

== Teams ==
2019 National Lacrosse League
Division	Team	City	Arena	Capacity
East	Buffalo Bandits	Buffalo, New York	KeyBank Center	19,070
East	Georgia Swarm	Duluth, Georgia	Infinite Energy Arena	10,500
East	New England Black Wolves	Uncasville, Connecticut	Mohegan Sun Arena	7,074
East	Philadelphia Wings	Philadelphia, Pennsylvania	Wells Fargo Center	19,306
East	Rochester Knighthawks	Rochester, New York	Blue Cross Arena	10,662
East	Toronto Rock	Toronto, Ontario	Scotiabank Arena	18,800
West	Calgary Roughnecks	Calgary, Alberta	Scotiabank Saddledome	19,289
West	Colorado Mammoth	Denver, Colorado	Pepsi Center	18,007
West	San Diego Seals	San Diego, California	Pechanga Arena	12,920
West	Saskatchewan Rush	Saskatoon, Saskatchewan	SaskTel Centre	15,195
West	Vancouver Warriors	Vancouver, British Columbia	Rogers Arena	18,910

=== Map of teams ===
East Division West Division

== Regular season ==
East Division
P	Team	GP	W	L	PCT	GB	Home	Road	GF	GA	Diff	GF/GP	GA/GP
1	Buffalo Bandits – xyz	18	14	4	.778	0.0	7–2	7–2	244	186	+58	13.56	10.33
2	Georgia Swarm – x	18	12	6	.667	2.0	7–2	5–4	230	210	+20	12.78	11.67
3	Toronto Rock – x	18	12	6	.667	2.0	8–1	4–5	213	207	+6	11.83	11.50
4	New England Black Wolves – x	18	9	9	.500	5.0	7–2	2–7	213	223	−10	11.83	12.39
5	Rochester Knighthawks	18	6	12	.333	8.0	4–5	2–7	212	226	−14	11.78	12.56
6	Philadelphia Wings	18	4	14	.222	10.0	3–6	1–8	218	246	−28	12.11	13.67

West Division
P	Team	GP	W	L	PCT	GB	Home	Road	GF	GA	Diff	GF/GP	GA/GP
1	Saskatchewan Rush – xy	18	11	7	.611	0.0	7–2	4–5	222	202	+20	12.33	11.22
2	San Diego Seals – x	18	10	8	.556	1.0	6–3	4–5	208	217	−9	11.56	12.06
3	Calgary Roughnecks – x	18	10	8	.556	1.0	5–4	5–4	212	201	+11	11.78	11.17
4	Colorado Mammoth – x	18	6	12	.333	5.0	3–6	3–6	181	193	−12	10.06	10.72
5	Vancouver Warriors	18	5	13	.278	6.0	3–6	2–7	179	221	−42	9.94	12.28

x: Clinched playoff berth; c: Clinched playoff berth by crossing over to another division; y: Clinched division; z: Clinched best regular season record; GP: Games Played
W: Wins; L: Losses; GB: Games back; PCT: Win percentage; Home: Record at Home; Road: Record on the Road; GF: Goals scored; GA: Goals allowed
Differential: Difference between goals scored and allowed; GF/GP: Average number of goals scored per game; GA/GP: Average number of goals allowed per game

== Scoring leaders ==
Note: GP = Games played; G = Goals; A = Assists; Pts = Points; PIM = Penalty minutes; LB = Loose Balls

Player	Team	GP	G	A	Pts	PIM	LB
Dane Dobbie	Calgary Roughnecks	18	47	68	115	12	69
Callum Crawford	New England Black Wolves	16	48	61	109	33	78
Mark Matthews	Saskatchewan Rush	18	41	64	105	8	70
Lyle Thompson	Georgia Swarm	18	43	62	105	6	94
Dhane Smith	Buffalo Bandits	16	32	70	102	8	72
Randy Staats	Georgia Swarm	17	37	59	96	12	45
Shawn Evans	Buffalo Bandits	17	28	66	94	17	69
Tom Schreiber	Toronto Rock	18	29	65	94	2	61
Stephan Leblanc	New England Black Wolves	18	27	66	93	13	58
Dan Dawson	San Diego Seals	18	29	59	88	8	49

== Leading goaltenders ==
Note: GP = Games played; Mins = Minutes played; W = Wins; L = Losses: GA = Goals Allowed; SV% = Save Percentage; GAA = Goals against average

Player	Team	GP	Mins	W	L	GA	SV%	GAA
Matt Vinc	Buffalo Bandits	18	1036	14	2	173	0.802	10.02
Adam Shute	Saskatchewan Rush	18	483	5	3	83	0.772	10.30
Dillon Ward	Colorado Mammoth	18	963	5	11	174	0.775	10.84
Mike Poulin	Georgia Swarm	17	899	11	4	164	0.791	10.94
Christian Del Bianco	Calgary Roughnecks	18	1074	10	8	200	0.781	11.17

== Playoffs ==
Divisional Semifinal
E1	Buffalo	13
E4	New England	6
Eastern Division
E2	Georgia	14
E3	Toronto	16
W1	Saskatchewan	10
W4	Colorado	11*
Western Division
W2	San Diego	11
W3	Calgary	12

Divisional Final
E1	Buffalo	12
E3	Toronto	8
W4	Colorado	4
W3	Calgary	8

NLL Final (best of 3)
E1	Buffalo	7	13	—
W3	Calgary	10	14*	—

*Overtime

=== Conference Semifinal ===
==== (E1) Buffalo Bandits vs. (E4) New England Black Wolves ====
May 7, 2019	Buffalo Bandits	13–6 (4–1, 3–2, 2–2, 4–1)	New England Black Wolves	KeyBank Center; Attendance: 11,776

Game reference

Matt Vinc
Zach Higgins
Goalies
Doug Jamieson
Alex Buque

MacKay – 00:45	1–0
Smith (Small, Cloutier) – 01:16	2–0
Evans (Cloutier, Smith) – 02:31	3–0
	3–1	09:16 – Crawford (Leblanc, Brock) (PP)
Fraser (Smith) – 13:36	4–1
	4–2	18:57 – Digby (O'Connor, Crawford)
	4–3	20:14 – Crawford (Nishimura)
Cloutier (Weiss, Vinc) – 22:45	5–3
Smith (Byrne, Small) (PP) – 25:57	6–3
Evans (Smith, Byrne) (PP)	7–3
Small (Cloutier, Byrne) (PP) – 36:48	8–3
	8–4	41:05 – O'Connor (Crawford, Fournier)
Priolo (Brownwell) (SH) – 43:23	9–4
	9–5	43:49 – Crawford (Leblanc, Digby) (PP)
Evans (Smith, Durtson) (PP) – 47:10	10–5
	10–6	49:52 – Crawford (Downing) (SH)
Small (Smith, Evans) (PP) – 50:40	11–6
Weiss (de Snoo) (ENG) – 55:55	12–6
Priolo (Spanger) (ENG) – 56:35	13–6

18 min
Penalties
27 min
59
Shots
54

==== (E2) Georgia Swarm vs. (E3) Toronto Rock ====
May 6, 2019	Georgia Swarm	14–16 (5–4, 2–6, 1–3, 6–3)	Toronto Rock	Infinite Energy Arena; Attendance: 8,862

Game reference

Mike Poulin
Goalies
Nick Rose

L. Thompson (Jackson, Cattoni) – 00:21	1–0
Staats (L. Thompson, Jackson) – 02:25	2–0
	2–1	03:12 – Jones (Hellyer, Harris)
	2–2	05:45 – Schreiber (Jones, Hellyer)
	2–3	09:03 – Powless (McArdle, Craig)
	2–4	10:03 – Craig (McArdle, Jones)
Williams (Cole, Jackson) – 13:04	3–4
Staats (Wiedemann, Poulin) – 13:46	4–4
Bomberry (Stouros, MacIntosh) – 13:55	5–4
	5–5	15:59 – Hellyer (Jones)
	5–6	16:57 – Sorensen (Craig)
	5–7	21:07 – Craig (Jones, Hellyer)
	5–8	22:26 – Jones (Schreiber, Rogers) (PP)
	5–9	23:16 – Schreiber (Jones, Hellyer)
M. Thompson (Jackson, Cattoni) (PP) – 26:16	6–9
	6–10	27:38 – McArdle (Jones)
Cattoni (Jackson, MacIntosh) – 28:26	7–10
	7–11	30:26 – Schreiber (Craig, McArdle)
	7–12	41:16 – McArdle (Craig, Kri) (SH)
	7–13	43:21 – Hellyer (Lintner, Kri)
MacIntosh – 43:30	8–13
Jackson (M. Thompson) – 46:45	9–13
L. Thompson (Jackson, Cole) – 53:28	10–13
	10–14	54:17 – Slade
	10–15	56:10 – Schreiber (Slade, Jay)
Cattoni (L. Thompson, Staats) – 56:33	11–15
	11–16	57:25 – Jones (Schreiber, Sorensen) (ENG)
Staats (L. Thompson, Cattoni) (PP) – 57:45	12–16
L. Thompson (Staats) – 58:00	13–16
Jackson (L. Thompson, Staats) – 58:26	14–16

6 min
Penalties
10 min
49
Shots
49

==== (W1) Saskatchewan Rush vs. (W4) Colorado Mammoth ====
May 3, 2019	Saskatchewan Rush	10–11 OT (2–3, 2–1, 3–0, 3–6, 0–1)	Colorado Mammoth	SaskTel Centre; Attendance: 11,658

Game reference

Evan Kirk
Goalies
Dillon Ward

Shattler (Keenan) – 06:05	1–0
	1–1	06:20 – Ruest (Cupido)
	1–2	06:46 – Wardle
	1–3	09:30 – Lee (Ruest)
Knight (Matthews, Campbell) – 12:53	2–3
Matthews (Shattler, Dinsdale) – 17:13	3–3
	3–4	17:39 – Noble (Vitarelli)
Church (McIntosh) (SH) – 27:22	4–4
McIntosh (Knight, Shattler) – 32:22	5–4
Knight – 41:34	6–4
Church (Shattler, Matthews) (PP) – 44:06	7–4
	7–5	46:03 – McLaughlin (Lee, Ruest)
Shattler (Corbeil, Kirk) – 48:01	8–5
	8–6	48:17 – Ruest (Stuart, Hope)
	8–7	50:01 – Lee (McLaughlin)
	8–8	53:03 – McLaughlin (Lee)
	8–9	53:20 – Ruest (Wardle, Stuart)
McIntosh (Matthews, Keenan) – 53:55	9–9
	9–10	57:04 – Lee (McLaughlin)
McIntosh – 59:19	10–10
	10–11	64:04 – Cupido

6 min
Penalties
8 min
54
Shots
41

==== (W2) San Diego Seals vs. (W3) Calgary Roughnecks ====
May 6, 2019	San Diego Seals	11–12 (3–2, 3–4, 4–2, 1–4)	Calgary Roughnecks	Pechanga Arena; Attendance: 5,005

Game reference

Frankie Scigliano
Goalies
Christian Del Bianco

	0–1	00:25 – Dickson (Dobbie, King)
Jackson (Billings, D. Dawson) – 01:14	1–1
Fields (Buchanan) – 04:40	2–1
Evans (Buchanan, Holding) – 07:57	3–1
	3–2	14:59 – Dickson (King, Dobbie) (PP)
Kearnan (Buchanan, Holding) (SH) – 16:59	4–2
Evans (D. Dawson, Jackson) – 17:29	5–2
	5–3	20:32 – Dobbie (Dickson) (PP)
	5–4	24:15 – King (Dickson, Simpson) (PP)
	5–5	26:53 – Dobbie (Dickson) (PP)
D. Dawson (Billings, Evans) – 27:51	6–5
	6–6	28:45 – Dickson (Callies, Del Bianco)
Clelland – 32:16	7–6
Buchanan (D. Dawson) – 32:50	8–6
	8–7	34:42 – Wilde (Dobbie)
Reinholdt – 39:19	9–7
Buchanan (Kearnan, D. Dawson) – 40:12	10–7
	10–8	41:26 – Dobbie (Duch, Loewen)
	10–9	47:34 – King (Dobbie, Bell)
	10–10	47:42 – Burton
	10–11	49:33 – Loewen (Harnett)
Evans (Jackson, Buchanan) – 49:14	11–11
	11–12	52:04 – Dickson (Wilde)

16 min
Penalties
8 min
54
Shots
43

=== Divisional Final ===
==== (E1) Buffalo Bandits vs. (E3) Toronto Rock ====
May 11, 2019	Buffalo Bandits	12–8 (2–2, 4–1, 2–3, 4–2)	Toronto Rock	KeyBank Center; Attendance: 11,635

Game reference

Matt Vinc
Goalies
Nick Rose

Smith (Martin, Vinc) – 02:27	1–0
	1–1	04:08 – Jones (Rogers) (PP)
Byrne (Hoggarth, Priolo) – 04:30	2–1
	2–2	04:47 – Sorensen (Edwards, Kri)
	2–3	23:49 – Rogers (Jones) (PP)
Small (Evans, Priolo) – 24:04	3–3
Sweeting (Smith, Gilray) – 25:29	4–3
Small (Smith, Hoggarth) – 26:30	5–3
Evans (Priolo, Sweeting) – 29:16	6–3
Spanger (Gilray) – 32:05	7–3
Small (Smith, Durston) (PP) – 38:23	8–3
	8–4	39:11 – McArdle (Schreiber, Jones)
	8–5	40:35 – Rogers (Jones, Schreiber) (PP)
	8–6	43:26 – Jones (Schreiber, Hellyer)
	8–7	48:00 – Jones (Schreiber, Hellyer)
Fraser (Priolo) – 50:25	9–7
Evans (Hoggarth, Byrne) – 51:56	10–7
Fraser (Evans, Smith) (PP) – 56:26	11–7
Brownell (O'Connor) (ENG) – 57:58	12–7
	12–8	58:30 – Jones (Hellyer)

12 min
Penalties
4 min
57
Shots
51

==== (W3) Calgary Roughnecks vs. (W4) Colorado Mammoth ====
May 11, 2019	Calgary Roughnecks	8–4 (0–0, 2–0, 4–3, 2–1)	Colorado Mammoth	Scotiabank Saddledome; Attendance: 8,900

Game reference

Christian Del Bianco
Goalies
Dillon Ward

Pace (Dickson, Dobbie) (PP) – 20:47	1–0
Dickson (Duch) – 29:51	2–0
King (Dickson, Duch) (PP) – 31:05	3–0
	3–1	32:54 – Lee (Wardle, Edwards)
Dobbie (Duch, Pace) – 35:44	4–1
King (Dobbie) (PP) – 37:14	5–1
Dobbie (Currier) (PP) – 37:30	6–1
	6–2	38:22 – McLaughlin (Vitarelli, Wardle)
	6–3	39:30 – Vitarelli (McLaughlin, Wardle)
Dickson (Dobbie, King) (PP) – 46:43	7–3
	7–4	51:55 – Lee (McLaughlin) (PP)
Callies (Dobbie) – 55:39	8–4

21 min
Penalties
19 min
54
Shots
51

=== NLL Final (best of three) ===
==== (E1) Buffalo Bandits vs. (W3) Calgary Roughnecks ====
May 18, 2019	Buffalo Bandits	7–10 (1–1, 1–1, 1–3, 4–5)	Calgary Roughnecks	KeyBank Center; Attendance: 15,747

Game reference

Matt Vinc
Goalies
Christian Del Bianco

	0–1	08:35 – Duch (Loewen)
Small (Evans, Smith) – 13:37	1–1
Smith (Evans, Byrne) – 24:39	2–1
	2–2	27:53 – Duch (Dobbie, Loewen)
Evans (Small) – 34:16	3–2
	3–3	34:58 – MacRae (Callies, Del Bianco)
	3–4	40:44 – Dickson (Dobbie, King)
	3–5	44:50 – Dobbie (King, Duch)
	3–6	45:34 – Dobbie (Dickson, Bell)
Small (Evans, Byrne) (PP) – 46:35	4–6
	4–7	47:22 – Dobbie (King)
	4–8	49:02 – King (Dobbie, Duch)
	4–9	49:47 – Taylor (Loewen)
Byrne (Priolo, MacKay) – 50:39	5–9
Byrne (Evans, Priolo)	6–9
Fraser – 54:25	7–9
	7–10	57:34 – Wilde (MacRae) (ENG)

11 min
Penalties
8 min
55
Shots
44

May 25, 2019	Calgary Roughnecks	14–13 OT (3–4, 6–2, 1–4, 3–3, 1–0)	Buffalo Bandits	Scotiabank Saddledome; Attendance: 17,038

Game reference

Christian Del Bianco
Goalies
Matt Vinc

Dobbie (King, Duch) (PP) – 02:32	1–0
	1–1	05:11 – Evans (Smith)
Loewen (Pace, Currier) – 08:39	2–1
	2–2	09:12 – Cloutier (Evans, Small)
	2–3	10:01 – Fraser (Smith)
	2–4	10:48 – Small (Byrne, Evans) (PP)
Dickson (MacRae, Del Bianco) – 12:05	3–4
	3–5	16:49 – Evans (Smith, Durston)
King (Loewen) (PP) – 19:56	4–5
Currier (Wilde) – 20:11	5–5
Burton – 21:38	6–5
Pace (Harnett) (PP) – 24:49	7–5
Loewen (Dobbie, King) (PP) – 26:31	8–5
	8–6	29:52 – Fraser (Cloutier, Small) (PP)
Dobbie (Dickson) – 29:59	9–6
	9–7	39:05 – Fraser (Cloutier) (PP)
	9–8	39:28 – Durtson (Evans, Priolo)
	9–9	41:26 – Spanger (Priolo)
Dobbie (King, Dickson) (PP) – 43:57	10–9
	10–10	44:24 – Durston (Evans, Smith)
Duch (Dobbie, King) – 45:18	11–10
Dickson (Dobbie, Taylor) – 46:06	12–10
	12–11	52:49 – Durtson (Smith) (PP)
	12–12	56:07 – Smith (Evans)
Dobbie (Del Bianco) – 59:05	13–12
	13–13	59:32 – Small (Smith, Cloutier)
Duch (Loewen, King) – 61:12	14–13

10 min
Penalties
10 min
51
Shots
56

Roughnecks win series 2–0.

== Awards ==
=== Annual awards ===
References: Nominees and Winners

Award	Winner	Other Finalists
Most Valuable Player	Dane Dobbie, Calgary Roughnecks	Lyle Thompson, Georgia Swarm; Matt Vinc, Buffalo Bandits
Goaltender of the Year	Matt Vinc, Buffalo Bandits	Christian Del Bianco, Calgary Roughnecks; Dillon Ward, Colorado Mammoth
Defensive Player of the Year	Graeme Hossack, Rochester Knighthawks	Steve Priolo, Buffalo Bandits; Kyle Rubisch, Saskatchewan Rush
Transition Player of the Year	Challen Rogers, Toronto Rock	Zach Currier, Calgary Roughnecks; Kiel Matisz, Philadelphia Wings
Rookie of the Year	Austin Staats, San Diego Seals	Ian MacKay, Buffalo Bandits; Matt Rambo, Philadelphia Wings
Sportsmanship Award	Lyle Thompson, Georgia Swarm	Dan Dawson, San Diego Seals; Tom Schreiber, Toronto Rock
GM of the Year	Steve Dietrich, Buffalo Bandits	Mike Board, Calgary Roughnecks; Patrick Merrill, San Diego Seals
Les Bartley Award	John Tavares/Rich Kilgour, Buffalo Bandits	Curt Malawsky, Calgary Roughnecks; Matt Sawyer, Toronto Rock
Executive of the Year Award	Terri Giberson, Toronto Rock	Lindsey Masciangelo, Philadelphia Wings; Dave Zygaj, Buffalo Bandits
Teammate of the Year Award	John Ranagan, Georgia Swarm	Kyle Buchanan, San Diego Seals; Chad Cummings, Calgary Roughnecks
Tom Borrelli Award	Tyson Geick, Lacrosse Flash	Bob Chavez, IL Indoor; Barstool Jordie, Barstool Sports

== Stadiums and locations ==
Buffalo Bandits	Georgia Swarm	New England Black Wolves	Philadelphia Wings	Rochester Knighthawks	Toronto Rock
KeyBank Center	Infinite Energy Arena	Mohegan Sun Arena	Wells Fargo Center	Blue Cross Arena	Scotiabank Arena
Capacity: 19,070	Capacity: 11,355	Capacity: 7,700	Capacity: 19,543	Capacity: 11,200	Capacity: 18,819

Calgary Roughnecks	Colorado Mammoth	San Diego Seals	Saskatchewan Rush	Vancouver Warriors
Scotiabank Saddledome	Pepsi Center	Valley View Casino Center	SaskTel Centre	Rogers Arena
Capacity: 19,289	Capacity: 18,007	Capacity: 12,920	Capacity: 15,190	Capacity: 18,910

== Attendance ==
=== Regular season ===
Home team	Home games	Average attendance	Total attendance
Saskatchewan Rush	9	13,459	121,131
Buffalo Bandits	9	13,046	117,415
Colorado Mammoth	9	12,815	115,342
Calgary Roughnecks	9	12,593	113,345
Philadelphia Wings	9	10,905	98,147
Toronto Rock	9	9,476	85,289
San Diego Seals	9	7,769	69,921
Vancouver Warriors	9	6,833	61,501
Georgia Swarm	9	6,698	60,287
Rochester Knighthawks	9	6,440	57,964
New England Black Wolves	9	5,526	49,741
League	99	9,596	950,083

=== Playoffs ===
Home team	Home games	Average attendance	Total attendance
Buffalo Bandits	3	13,052	39,158
Calgary Roughnecks	2	12,969	25,938
Saskatchewan Rush	1	11,658	11,658
Georgia Swarm	1	8,862	8,862
San Diego Seals	1	5,005	5,005
League	12	10,509	126,110

== See also ==
- 2019 in sports
