= 2019 Buffalo Bandits season =

2019 Buffalo Bandits
- East Division Champions
- League: NLL
- Division: 1st East
- 2019 record: 14–4
- Home record: 7–2
- Road record: 7–2
- Goals for: 244
- Goals against: 186
- General Manager: Steve Dietrich
- Coach: John Tavares; Rich Kilgour
- Captain: Steve Priolo
- Arena: KeyBank Center
- Average attendance: 13,046

Team leaders
- Goals: Corey Small (36)
- Assists: Dhane Smith (70)
- Points: Dhane Smith (102)
- Penalties in minutes: Nick Weiss (41)
- Loose Balls: Steve Priolo (135)
- Wins: Matt Vinc (14)
- Goals against average: Matt Vinc (10.02)

The Buffalo Bandits are a lacrosse team based in Buffalo, New York playing in the National Lacrosse League (NLL). The 2019 season was their 28th season in the NLL.

Two seasons after finishing with the worst record in the NLL, the Bandits finished the season with a league-best 14–4 record, a 1st-place finish in the East, and the first seed in the playoffs. Buffalo took care of the New England Black Wolves in the Eastern division semi-final, 13–6, which was followed up by defeating the Toronto Rock in the Eastern Division final, 12–8, to advance to the NLL Finals, where they would face the Calgary Roughnecks.

Despite holding home-floor advantage, the Bandits would be swept by the Roughnecks in the championship series, losing in overtime in Calgary in Game 2.

== Regular season ==
=== Final standings ===
East Division
P	Team	GP	W	L	PCT	GB	Home	Road	GF	GA	Diff	GF/GP	GA/GP
1	Buffalo Bandits – xyz	18	14	4	.778	0.0	7–2	7–2	244	186	+58	13.56	10.33
2	Georgia Swarm – x	18	12	6	.667	2.0	7–2	5–4	230	210	+20	12.78	11.67
3	Toronto Rock – x	18	12	6	.667	2.0	8–1	4–5	213	207	+6	11.83	11.50
4	New England Black Wolves – x	18	9	9	.500	5.0	7–2	2–7	213	223	−10	11.83	12.39
5	Rochester Knighthawks	18	6	12	.333	8.0	4–5	2–7	212	226	−14	11.78	12.56
6	Philadelphia Wings	18	4	14	.222	10.0	3–6	1–8	218	246	−28	12.11	13.67

West Division
P	Team	GP	W	L	PCT	GB	Home	Road	GF	GA	Diff	GF/GP	GA/GP
1	Saskatchewan Rush – xy	18	11	7	.611	0.0	7–2	4–5	222	202	+20	12.33	11.22
2	San Diego Seals – x	18	10	8	.556	1.0	6–3	4–5	208	217	−9	11.56	12.06
3	Calgary Roughnecks – x	18	10	8	.556	1.0	5–4	5–4	212	201	+11	11.78	11.17
4	Colorado Mammoth – x	18	6	12	.333	5.0	3–6	3–6	181	193	−12	10.06	10.72
5	Vancouver Warriors	18	5	13	.278	6.0	3–6	2–7	179	221	−42	9.94	12.28

x: Clinched playoff berth; c: Clinched playoff berth by crossing over to another division; y: Clinched division; z: Clinched best regular season record; GP: Games Played
W: Wins; L: Losses; GB: Games back; PCT: Win percentage; Home: Record at Home; Road: Record on the Road; GF: Goals scored; GA: Goals allowed
Differential: Difference between goals scored and allowed; GF/GP: Average number of goals scored per game; GA/GP: Average number of goals allowed per game

=== Game log ===
Game	Date	Opponent	Location	Score	OT	Attendance	Record
1	December 15, 2018	@ Philadelphia Wings	Wells Fargo Center	W 17–15		11,023	1–0
2	December 21, 2018	Toronto Rock	KeyBank Center	L 12–17		10,370	1–1
3	December 28, 2018	Vancouver Warriors	KeyBank Center	W 16–10		12,005	2–1
4	January 5, 2019	Rochester Knighthawks	KeyBank Center	W 13–4		12,480	3–1
5	January 19, 2019	Philadelphia Wings	KeyBank Center	W 14–10		10,509	4–1
6	January 26, 2019	@ Rochester Knighthawks	Blue Cross Arena	L 13–18		8,337	4–2
7	January 27, 2019	@ New England Black Wolves	Mohegan Sun Arena	W 15–5		5,098	5–2
8	February 2, 2019	Colorado Mammoth	KeyBank Center	W 15–12		10,766	6–2
9	February 9, 2019	@ Georgia Swarm	Infinite Energy Arena	W 19–9		7,767	7–2
10	February 16, 2019	Calgary Roughnecks	KeyBank Center	W 12–10		13,085	8–2
11	February 22, 2019	@ Rochester Knighthawks	Blue Cross Arena	W 16–9		6,672	9–2
12	March 8, 2019	@ Philadelphia Wings	Wells Fargo Center	W 12–11	OT	10,805	10–2
13	March 9, 2019	Georgia Swarm	KeyBank Center	L 9–14		15,061	10–3
14	March 16, 2019	@ Saskatchewan Rush	SaskTel Centre	W 12–11	OT	13,291	11–3
15	March 23, 2019	Toronto Rock	KeyBank Center	W 8–6		16,580	12–3
16	April 5, 2019	@ Toronto Rock	Scotiabank Arena	L 11–12	OT	9,565	12–4
17	April 20, 2019	New England Black Wolves	KeyBank Center	W 12–6		16,559	13–4
18	April 27, 2019	@ San Diego Seals	Pechanga Arena	W 18–7		8,357	14–4

=== Playoffs ===
Game	Date	Opponent	Location	Score	OT	Attendance	Record
Eastern division semi-Final	May 4, 2019	New England Black Wolves	KeyBank Center	W 13–6		11,776	1–0
Eastern division Final	May 11, 2019	Toronto Rock	KeyBank Center	W 12–8		11,635	2–0
NLL Final (game 1)	May 18, 2019	Calgary Roughnecks	KeyBank Center	L 7–10		15,747	2–1
NLL Final (game 2)	May 25, 2019	@ Calgary Roughnecks	Scotiabank Saddledome	L 13–14	OT	17,038	2–2

== Roster ==
Buffalo Bandits roster
Active (21-man) roster		Inactive roster	Coaches
Goaltenders: 33 (Canada) Zach Higgins; 48 (Canada) Matt Vinc; Defensemen: 7 (Canada) Bryce Sweeting; 12 (Canada) Mitch de Snoo; 19 (Canada) Matthew Bennett; 20 (Canada) Nick Weiss; 21 (Canada) Justin Martin; 23 (Canada) Steve Priolo (C); 25 (Canada) Matt Spanger; 94 (Canada) Ryan Wagner	Forwards: 22 (Canada) Josh Byrne; 45 (Canada) Corey Small; 78 (Canada) Jordan Durston; 91 (Canada) Thomas Hoggarth; 92 (Canada) Dhane Smith; 95 (Canada) Chase Fraser; Transition: 4 (Canada) Ian MacKay; 8 (Canada) Kevin Brownell; 37 (Canada) Ethan O’Connor; 81 (Canada) Matt Gilray	Practice squad: (Canada) Dallas Bridle; 71 (Canada) Zach Herreweyers; (Republic of Ireland) Devlin Shanahan; Injured reserve: 9 (Canada) Mark Steenhuis; (Canada) Jon Harnett	Head coach: John Tavares; Assistant coaches: Anthony Cosmo; Dave Pym; Rusty Kruger; Equipment Manager: Ted Cordingley; Legend: * Suspended list; (C) Captain; (A) Alternate captain; Roster updated 2019-01-06; NLL Transactions

=== Entry Draft ===
The 2018 NLL Entry Draft took place on September 25, 2018. The Bandits made the following selections:

Round	Overall	Player	College/Club
1	3	Matt Gilray	
1	4	Ian MacKay	
4	43	Devlin Shanahan	

== Player stats ==
=== Runners (Top 10) ===
Player	GP	G	A	Pts	LB	PIM
Dhane Smith	16	32	70	102	72	8
Shawn Evans	17	28	66	94	69	17
Corey Small	17	36	38	74	75	2
Thomas Hoggarth	17	29	32	61	90	4
Jordan Durston	18	15	32	47	64	14
Chase Fraser	16	29	15	44	84	10
Josh Byrne	9	13	29	42	33	2
Ian MacKay	18	11	21	32	88	8
Steve Priolo	18	11	15	26	135	21
Chris Cloutier	8	12	10	22	29	0
Totals		244	384	628	1,342	224

=== Goaltenders ===
Player	GP	MIN	W	L	GA	Sv%	GAA
Matt Vinc	18	1,036:24	14	2	173	.803	10.02
Zach Higgins	18	51:53	0	2	13	.783	15.03
Totals		1,088:17	14	4	186	.802	10.25

== See also ==
- 2019 NLL season
