= 2019 Calgary Roughnecks season =

2019 Calgary Roughnecks
- NLL Champions
- West Division Champions
- League: NLL
- Division: 3rd West
- 2019 record: 10-8
- Home record: 5-4
- Road record: 5-4
- Goals for: 212
- Goals against: 201
- General Manager: Mike Board
- Coach: Curt Malawsky
- Captain: Dan McRae
- Arena: Scotiabank Saddledome

The Calgary Roughnecks are a lacrosse team based in Calgary playing in the National Lacrosse League (NLL). The 2019 season is the 18th in franchise history.

== Final standings ==
East Division
P	Team	GP	W	L	PCT	GB	Home	Road	GF	GA	Diff	GF/GP	GA/GP
1	Buffalo Bandits – xyz	18	14	4	.778	0.0	7–2	7–2	244	186	+58	13.56	10.33
2	Georgia Swarm – x	18	12	6	.667	2.0	7–2	5–4	230	210	+20	12.78	11.67
3	Toronto Rock – x	18	12	6	.667	2.0	8–1	4–5	213	207	+6	11.83	11.50
4	New England Black Wolves – x	18	9	9	.500	5.0	7–2	2–7	213	223	−10	11.83	12.39
5	Rochester Knighthawks	18	6	12	.333	8.0	4–5	2–7	212	226	−14	11.78	12.56
6	Philadelphia Wings	18	4	14	.222	10.0	3–6	1–8	218	246	−28	12.11	13.67

West Division
P	Team	GP	W	L	PCT	GB	Home	Road	GF	GA	Diff	GF/GP	GA/GP
1	Saskatchewan Rush – xy	18	11	7	.611	0.0	7–2	4–5	222	202	+20	12.33	11.22
2	San Diego Seals – x	18	10	8	.556	1.0	6–3	4–5	208	217	−9	11.56	12.06
3	Calgary Roughnecks – x	18	10	8	.556	1.0	5–4	5–4	212	201	+11	11.78	11.17
4	Colorado Mammoth – x	18	6	12	.333	5.0	3–6	3–6	181	193	−12	10.06	10.72
5	Vancouver Warriors	18	5	13	.278	6.0	3–6	2–7	179	221	−42	9.94	12.28

x: Clinched playoff berth; c: Clinched playoff berth by crossing over to another division; y: Clinched division; z: Clinched best regular season record; GP: Games Played
W: Wins; L: Losses; GB: Games back; PCT: Win percentage; Home: Record at Home; Road: Record on the Road; GF: Goals scored; GA: Goals allowed
Differential: Difference between goals scored and allowed; GF/GP: Average number of goals scored per game; GA/GP: Average number of goals allowed per game

=== Regular season ===
Game	Date	Opponent	Location	Score	OT	Attendance	Record
1	December 15, 2018	Vancouver Warriors	Scotiabank Saddledome	L 13–14	OT	10,804	0–1
2	December 21, 2018	@ Vancouver Warriors	Rogers Arena	W 14–8		9,902	1–1
3	December 28, 2018	San Diego Seals	Scotiabank Saddledome	W 9–5		12,696	2–1
4	January 6, 2019	@ Colorado Mammoth	Pepsi Center	W 11–8		11,378	3–1
5	January 12, 2019	New England Black Wolves	Scotiabank Saddledome	L 10–16		12,439	3–2
6	January 18, 2019	@ San Diego Seals	Valley View Casino Center	L 9–15		7,283	3–3
7	January 20, 2019	@ Colorado Mammoth	Pepsi Center	L 7–12		11,101	3–4
8	February 2, 2019	Vancouver Warriors	Scotiabank Saddledome	W 8–5		10,817	4–4
9	February 9, 2019	@ Saskatchewan Rush	SaskTel Centre	W 17–12		13,424	5–4
10	February 16, 2019	@ Buffalo Bandits	KeyBank Center	L 10–12		13,085	5–5
11	March 2, 2019	@ Saskatchewan Rush	SaskTel Centre	L 9–15		12,814	5–6
12	March 9, 2019	Toronto Rock	Scotiabank Saddledome	W 15–9		10,674	6–6
13	March 16, 2019	Colorado Mammoth	Scotiabank Saddledome	L 9–11		13,946	6–7
14	March 23, 2019	@ Rochester Knighthawks	Blue Cross Arena	W 12–9		5,394	7–7
15	March 30, 2019	San Diego Seals	Scotiabank Saddledome	L 9–16		10,854	7–8
16	April 6, 2019	@ Philadelphia Wings	Wells Fargo Center (Philadelphia)	W 18–13		9,150	8–8
17	April 12, 2019	Georgia Swarm	Scotiabank Saddledome	W 14–13		11,826	9–8
18	April 20, 2019	Saskatchewan Rush	Scotiabank Saddledome	W 18–8		19,289	10–8

=== Playoffs ===
Game	Date	Opponent	Location	Score	OT	Attendance	Record
Western division semi-final	May 6, 2019	@ San Diego Seals	Valley View Casino Center	W 12–11		5,005	1–0
Western division final	May 10, 2019	Colorado Mammoth	Scotiabank Saddledome	W 8–4		8,900	2–0
NLL Final (game 1)	May 18, 2019	@ Buffalo Bandits	KeyBank Center	W 10–7		15,747	3–0
NLL Final (game 2)	May 25, 2019	Buffalo Bandits	Scotiabank Saddledome	W 14–13		17,038	4–0

== Roster ==
Calgary Roughnecks roster
Active (21-man) roster		Inactive roster	Coaches
Goaltenders: 35 (Canada) Christian Del Bianco; 00 (Canada) Tyler Richards; Defensemen: 16 (Canada) Mike Carnegie; 11 (Canada) Greg Harnett (A); 81 (Canada) Anthony Kalinich; 68 (Canada) Tyler Pace; 13 (Canada) Eli Salama	Forwards: 21 (Canada) Chris Boushy; 8 (Canada) Carter Dickson; 44 (Canada) Dane Dobbie (A); 18 (Canada) Rhys Duch; 89 (Canada) Riley Loewen; 88 (Canada) Ryan Martel; 68 (Canada) Tyler Pace; 26 (Canada) Dan Taylor; Transition: 94 (Canada) Tyson Bell; 7 (Canada) Tyler Burton; 2 (Canada) Reece Callies; 25 (Canada) Chad Cummings; 77 (Canada) Zach Currier; 3 (Canada) Dan MacRae (C); 22 (Canada) Shane Simpson; 55 (Canada) Mitch Wilde	Practice squad: 41 (Canada) Bob Snider; 47 (Canada) Sean Tyrrell; Injured reserve: 10 (Canada) Curtis Manning; 19 (Canada) Jesse King; Protected list: 14 (Canada) Wesley Berg; 17 (Canada) Curtis Dickson (A)	Head coach: Curt Malawsky; Assistant coaches: Bob McMahon; Rob Williams; Legend: * Suspended list; (C) Captain; (A) Alternate captain; updated 2017-12-09; NLL Transactions

== See also ==
- 2019 NLL season
