= 2019 New England Black Wolves season =

2019 New England Black Wolves
- League: NLL
- Division: 4th East
- 2019 record: 9-9
- Home record: 7-2
- Road record: 2-7
- Goals for: 213
- Goals against: 223
- General Manager: Chris Seinko
- Coach: Glenn Clark
- Captain: Brett Manney
- Alternate captains: Stephan Leblanc; John LaFontaine
- Arena: Mohegan Sun Arena

The New England Black Wolves are a lacrosse team based in Uncasville, Connecticut playing in the National Lacrosse League (NLL). The 2019 season was the team's 5th season in the league.

== Regular season ==
=== Current standings ===
East Division
P	Team	GP	W	L	PCT	GB	Home	Road	GF	GA	Diff	GF/GP	GA/GP
1	Buffalo Bandits – xyz	18	14	4	.778	0.0	7–2	7–2	244	186	+58	13.56	10.33
2	Georgia Swarm – x	18	12	6	.667	2.0	7–2	5–4	230	210	+20	12.78	11.67
3	Toronto Rock – x	18	12	6	.667	2.0	8–1	4–5	213	207	+6	11.83	11.50
4	New England Black Wolves – x	18	9	9	.500	5.0	7–2	2–7	213	223	−10	11.83	12.39
5	Rochester Knighthawks	18	6	12	.333	8.0	4–5	2–7	212	226	−14	11.78	12.56
6	Philadelphia Wings	18	4	14	.222	10.0	3–6	1–8	218	246	−28	12.11	13.67

West Division
P	Team	GP	W	L	PCT	GB	Home	Road	GF	GA	Diff	GF/GP	GA/GP
1	Saskatchewan Rush – xy	18	11	7	.611	0.0	7–2	4–5	222	202	+20	12.33	11.22
2	San Diego Seals – x	18	10	8	.556	1.0	6–3	4–5	208	217	−9	11.56	12.06
3	Calgary Roughnecks – x	18	10	8	.556	1.0	5–4	5–4	212	201	+11	11.78	11.17
4	Colorado Mammoth – x	18	6	12	.333	5.0	3–6	3–6	181	193	−12	10.06	10.72
5	Vancouver Warriors	18	5	13	.278	6.0	3–6	2–7	179	221	−42	9.94	12.28

x: Clinched playoff berth; c: Clinched playoff berth by crossing over to another division; y: Clinched division; z: Clinched best regular season record; GP: Games Played
W: Wins; L: Losses; GB: Games back; PCT: Win percentage; Home: Record at Home; Road: Record on the Road; GF: Goals scored; GA: Goals allowed
Differential: Difference between goals scored and allowed; GF/GP: Average number of goals scored per game; GA/GP: Average number of goals allowed per game

== Game log ==
Game	Date	Opponent	Location	Score	OT	Attendance	Record
1	December 15, 2018	@ Georgia Swarm	Infinite Energy Arena	L 12–16		4,943	0–1
2	December 28, 2018	Saskatchewan Rush	Mohegan Sun Arena	W 12–11		6,445	1–1
3	January 12, 2019	@ Calgary Roughnecks	Scotiabank Saddledome	W 16–10		12,439	2–1
4	January 19, 2019	Georgia Swarm	Mohegan Sun Arena	W 13–12		4,393	3–1
5	January 27, 2019	Buffalo Bandits	Mohegan Sun Arena	L 5–15		5,098	3–2
6	February 1, 2019	@ Georgia Swarm	Infinite Energy Arena	L 8–10		4,405	3–3
7	February 9, 2019	Rochester Knighthawks	Mohegan Sun Arena	W 16–13		5,766	4–3
8	February 16, 2019	@ Philadelphia Wings	Wells Fargo Center	L 10–14		10,614	4–4
9	February 17, 2019	Philadelphia Wings	Mohegan Sun Arena	W 17–11		5,805	5–4
10	February 24, 2019	Toronto Rock	Mohegan Sun Arena	W 13–11		5,691	6–4
11	March 3, 2019	Colorado Mammoth	Mohegan Sun Arena	W 17–11		4,954	7–4
12	March 16, 2019	@ Vancouver Warriors	Rogers Arena	L 9–12		5,769	7–5
13	March 23, 2019	@ Philadelphia Wings	Wells Fargo Center	L 8–13		11,988	7–6
14	March 31, 2019	Rochester Knighthawks	Mohegan Sun Arena	L 8–13		5,545	7–7
15	April 6, 2019	San Diego Seals	Mohegan Sun Arena	W 17–14		6,046	8–7
16	April 12, 2019	@ Toronto Rock	Scotiabank Arena	L 12–13		9,829	8–8
17	April 20, 2019	@ Buffalo Bandits	KeyBank Center	L 6–12		16,559	8–9
18	April 27, 2019	@ Rochester Knighthawks	Blue Cross Arena	W 14–12		6,158	9–9

=== Playoffs ===
Game	Date	Opponent	Location	Score	OT	Attendance	Record
Eastern division semi-final	May 4, 2019	@ Buffalo Bandits	KeyBank Center	L 6–13			0–1

== Roster ==
New England Black Wolves roster
Active (21-man) roster		Inactive roster	Coaches
Goaltenders: 29 (Canada) Alex Buque; 30 (Canada) Doug Jamieson; Defensemen: 10 (Haudenosaunee) Adam Bomberry; 4 (Canada) David Brock; 24 (Canada) Joel Coyle; 8 (United States) Greg Downing; 81 (Canada) Ryan Fournier; 13 (United States) Brett Manney (C); 26 (Canada) Jackson Nishimura; (Canada) Adam Perroni; 20 (Canada) Andrew Suitor	Forwards: 27 (United States) Kevin Buchanan; 22 (Canada) Nick Chaykowsky; 98 (Canada) Callum Crawford; 23 (Canada) Tyler Digby; 77 (United States) Dereck Downs; 14 (United States) Dave Emala; 83 (Canada) JP Kealey; 86 (Canada) Stephan Leblanc (A); 9 (Canada) Reilly O'Connor; Transition: 17 (Canada) Colton Watkinson	Practice squad: 5 (United States) Tal Bruno (D); (Haudenosaunee) Quinn Powless; 35 (Canada) Ethan Woods (G); Injured reserve: 33 (Canada) John LaFontaine (A)	Head coach {{{Head Coach}}} Legend: * Suspended list; (C) Captain; (A) Alternate captain; Roster updated 2019-02-07; NLL Transactions

=== Entry draft ===
The 2018 NLL Entry Draft took place on September 25, 2018. The Black Wolves made the following selections:

Round	Overall	Player	College/Club
2	26	Jackson Nishimura	
3	31	Ethan Woods	
3	34	Tal Bruno	
5	59	Dereck Downs	
6	70	Matt Lee	

== See also ==
- 2019 NLL season
