= 2024 Toronto Rock season =

Season of Toronto Rock lacrosse team

2024 Toronto Rock
- League: NLL
- 2024 record: 15-3
- Home record: 7-2
- Road record: 8-1
- Goals for: 218
- Goals against: 169
- General Manager: Jamie Dawick
- Coach: Matt Sawyer
- Captain: Challen Rogers
- Alternate captains: Rob Hellyer; Bill Hostrawser; Brad Kri; Tom Schreiber
- Arena: FirstOntario Centre
- Average attendance: 7,894

The Toronto Rock are a lacrosse team based in Hamilton, Ontario playing in the National Lacrosse League (NLL). The 2024 season is the 26th in franchise history, and 25th as the Rock.

== Regular season ==
It was originally announced that beginning in January 2024, the Rock would need to temporarily relocate their home games to the Paramount Fine Foods Centre in Mississauga, Ontario, as following their home games in December 2023 Hamilton's FirstOntario Centre would close for renovations for approximately two years. This also forced the Bulldogs and Honey Badgers to temporarily and permanently relocate to Brantford and Brampton, respectively. However, in September 2023 it was announced that the renovations would be delayed and that the Toronto Rock would play the entirety of the 2023/24 season in Hamilton before temporarily relocating to Mississauga for the following season until the renovations are completed.

Prior to the season the league announced a new alignment of teams, with the Eastern and Western conferences being eliminated in favour of a single unified standings for ranking the teams.

The Rock made a number of notable acquisitions in the offseason via trades and free agency, including Mark Matthews, Chris Boushy, Dan Lintner, and Justin Martin. Meanwhile, the team lost Jamison Dilks, Zach Manns and Adam Jay. Additionally, Dan Dawson retired.

Latrell Harris, the defending National Lacrosse League Defensive Player of the Year Award, injured his ACL in the offseason and will be out for the full season.

The team had a strong start to the regular season, winning its first 5 games. The Rock finished 15–3, and clinched first place after defeating the Rochester Knighthawks 13–6 on April 13.

=== Final standings ===
P	Team	GP	W	L	PCT	GB	Home	Road	GF	GA	Diff	GF/GP	GA/GP
1	Toronto Rock – xz	18	15	3	.833	0.0	7–2	8–1	218	169	+49	12.11	9.39
2	San Diego Seals – x	18	13	5	.722	2.0	8–1	5–4	210	178	+32	11.67	9.89
3	Albany FireWolves – x	18	11	7	.611	4.0	5–4	6–3	206	191	+15	11.44	10.61
4	Buffalo Bandits – x	18	11	7	.611	4.0	6–3	5–4	237	212	+25	13.17	11.78
5	Georgia Swarm – x	18	10	8	.556	5.0	6–3	4–5	198	197	+1	11.00	10.94
6	Halifax Thunderbirds – x	18	10	8	.556	5.0	6–3	4–5	228	200	+28	12.67	11.11
7	Panther City Lacrosse Club – x	18	9	9	.500	6.0	5–4	4–5	205	202	+3	11.39	11.22
8	Rochester Knighthawks – x	18	8	10	.444	7.0	4–5	4–5	214	226	−12	11.89	12.56
9	New York Riptide	18	8	10	.444	7.0	4–5	4–5	206	234	−28	11.44	13.00
10	Saskatchewan Rush	18	8	10	.444	7.0	4–5	4–5	217	210	+7	12.06	11.67
11	Calgary Roughnecks	18	8	10	.444	7.0	6–3	2–7	198	194	+4	11.00	10.78
12	Vancouver Warriors	18	8	10	.444	7.0	5–4	3–6	202	211	−9	11.22	11.72
13	Philadelphia Wings	18	6	12	.333	9.0	1–8	5–4	198	233	−35	11.00	12.94
14	Las Vegas Desert Dogs	18	5	13	.278	10.0	2–7	3–6	176	223	−47	9.78	12.39
15	Colorado Mammoth	18	5	13	.278	10.0	4–5	1–8	193	226	−33	10.72	12.56

== Game log ==
=== Regular season ===
Game	Date	Opponent	Location	Score	OT	Attendance	Record
1	December 9, 2023	Philadelphia Wings	FirstOntario Centre	W 11–7		7,217	1–0
2	December 22, 2023	@ Panther City Lacrosse Club	Dickies Arena	W 13–10		2,862	2–0
3	December 30, 2023	New York Riptide	FirstOntario Centre	W 14–8		9,566	3–0
4	January 12, 2024	@ Halifax Thunderbirds	Scotiabank Centre	W 11–9		8,921	4–0
5	January 20, 2024	Georgia Swarm	FirstOntario Centre	W 12–9		7,420	5–0
6	January 27, 2024	Buffalo Bandits	FirstOntario Centre	L 14–16		8,586	5–1
7	February 3, 2024	@ Calgary Roughnecks	Scotiabank Saddledome	W 9–7		9,971	6–1
8	February 10, 2024	Calgary Roughnecks	FirstOntario Centre	L 10–11		7,263	6–2
9	February 16, 2024	@ New York Riptide	Place Bell	W 16–10		6,437	7–2
10	February 24, 2024	Vancouver Warriors	FirstOntario Centre	W 9–5		7,611	8–2
11	March 1, 2024	@ Las Vegas Desert Dogs	Michelob Ultra Arena	W 16–11		6,039	9–2
12	March 2, 2024	@ San Diego Seals	Pechanga Arena	W 15–13		4,199	10–2
13	March 9, 2024	Colorado Mammoth	FirstOntario Centre	W 12–7		9,220	11–2
14	March 16, 2024	@ Buffalo Bandits	KeyBank Center	L 12–14		18,463	11–3
15	March 23, 2024	Halifax Thunderbirds	FirstOntario Centre	W 9–8	OT	9,588	12–3
16	April 6, 2024	@ Albany FireWolves	MVP Arena	W 10–7		5,749	13–3
17	April 13, 2024	Rochester Knighthawks	FirstOntario Centre	W 13–6		11,256	14–3
18	April 20, 2024	@ Saskatchewan Rush	SaskTel Centre	W 12–11		9,069	15–3

=== Playoffs ===
Game	Date	Opponent	Location	Score	OT	Attendance	Record
Quarterfinals	April 27, 2024	Rochester Knighthawks	FirstOntario Centre	W 9–6		6,934	1–0
Semifinals (game 1)	May 3, 2024	Buffalo Bandits	FirstOntario Centre	L 4–12		7,130	1–1
Semifinals (game 2)	May 5, 2024	@ Buffalo Bandits	KeyBank Center	L 8–10		16,312	1–2

== Roster ==
Toronto Rock roster
Active (21-man) roster		Inactive roster	Coaches
Goaltenders: 1 (Canada) Riley Hutchcraft; 66 (Canada) Nick Rose; Defensemen: 71 (Canada) Sheldon Burns; 21 (Canada) Mitch de Snoo; 42 (Canada) Jamison Dilks; 45 (Canada) Damon Edwards; 93 (Canada) Latrell Harris; 91 (Canada) Billy Hostrawser (A); 3 (United States) T. D. Ierlan; 33 (Canada) Josh Jubenville; 20 (Canada) Bradley Kri (A); 22 (Canada) Jason Noble; 61 (Canada) Brandon Slade (D)	Forwards: 25 (Canada) Dan Craig; 6 (Canada) Dan Dawson; 10 (Canada) Rob Hellyer (A); 2 (Canada) Zach Manns; 97 (Canada) Reid Reinholdt; 19 (Canada) Justin Scott; 26 (United States) Tom Schreiber (A); Transition: 14 (Canada) Phil Mazzuca; 23 (Canada) Challen Rogers (C)	Practice squad: 17 (Canada) Aaron Forster (F); 92 (Canada) Troy Holowchuk (G); Injured reserve: 47 (Canada) Adam Jay (D); 55 (Canada) Chris Weier (D); Holdout: 51 (Canada) Jordan McKenna (D)	Head coach: Matt Sawyer; Assistant coaches: Bruce Codd; Blaine Manning; Brandon Miller; Legend: * Suspended list; (C) Captain; (A) Alternate captain; Roster updated 2022-3-1; NLL Transactions

=== Entry Draft ===
The 2023 NLL Entry Draft took place on September 11, 2023. The Toronto Rock made the following selections:

Round	Overall	Player	College/Club
3	39	Zack Kearney	Umass Amherst- Oakville Rock Sr. B
3	50	Chase Schiavon	Orangeville
4	65	John Wheller	Whitby Warriors
5	79	Brett Handsor	Johns Hopkins- Oakville Rock Sr. B
6	94	Luke Dawick	Oakville Buzz Jr. A
