= 2019 Toronto Rock season =

2019 Toronto Rock
- League: NLL
- Division: 3rd East
- 2019 record: 12-6
- Home record: 8-1
- Road record: 4-5
- Goals for: 213
- Goals against: 207
- General Manager: Jamie Dawick
- Coach: Matt Sawyer
- Captain: Challen Rogers
- Alternate captains: Rob Hellyer; Bill Hostrawser; Brad Kri; Tom Schreiber
- Arena: Scotiabank Arena

The Toronto Rock are a lacrosse team based in Toronto playing in the National Lacrosse League (NLL). The 2019 season is the 22nd in franchise history, and 21st as the Rock.

== Regular season ==
=== Final standings ===
East Division
P	Team	GP	W	L	PCT	GB	Home	Road	GF	GA	Diff	GF/GP	GA/GP
1	Buffalo Bandits – xyz	18	14	4	.778	0.0	7–2	7–2	244	186	+58	13.56	10.33
2	Georgia Swarm – x	18	12	6	.667	2.0	7–2	5–4	230	210	+20	12.78	11.67
3	Toronto Rock – x	18	12	6	.667	2.0	8–1	4–5	213	207	+6	11.83	11.50
4	New England Black Wolves – x	18	9	9	.500	5.0	7–2	2–7	213	223	−10	11.83	12.39
5	Rochester Knighthawks	18	6	12	.333	8.0	4–5	2–7	212	226	−14	11.78	12.56
6	Philadelphia Wings	18	4	14	.222	10.0	3–6	1–8	218	246	−28	12.11	13.67

West Division
P	Team	GP	W	L	PCT	GB	Home	Road	GF	GA	Diff	GF/GP	GA/GP
1	Saskatchewan Rush – xy	18	11	7	.611	0.0	7–2	4–5	222	202	+20	12.33	11.22
2	San Diego Seals – x	18	10	8	.556	1.0	6–3	4–5	208	217	−9	11.56	12.06
3	Calgary Roughnecks – x	18	10	8	.556	1.0	5–4	5–4	212	201	+11	11.78	11.17
4	Colorado Mammoth – x	18	6	12	.333	5.0	3–6	3–6	181	193	−12	10.06	10.72
5	Vancouver Warriors	18	5	13	.278	6.0	3–6	2–7	179	221	−42	9.94	12.28

x: Clinched playoff berth; c: Clinched playoff berth by crossing over to another division; y: Clinched division; z: Clinched best regular season record; GP: Games Played
W: Wins; L: Losses; GB: Games back; PCT: Win percentage; Home: Record at Home; Road: Record on the Road; GF: Goals scored; GA: Goals allowed
Differential: Difference between goals scored and allowed; GF/GP: Average number of goals scored per game; GA/GP: Average number of goals allowed per game

== Game log ==
=== Regular season ===
Game	Date	Opponent	Location	Score	OT	Attendance	Record
1	December 21, 2018	@ Buffalo Bandits	KeyBank Center	W 17–12		10,370	1–0
2	December 28, 2018	Georgia Swarm	Scotiabank Arena	L 11–12		10,123	1–1
3	January 4, 2019	Philadelphia Wings	Scotiabank Arena	W 11–10	OT	8,299	2–1
4	January 12, 2019	@ Colorado Mammoth	Pepsi Center	W 11–10		11,678	3–1
5	January 18, 2019	Georgia Swarm	Scotiabank Arena	W 14–9		7,118	4–1
6	January 26, 2019	@ Philadelphia Wings	Wells Fargo Center	W 13–12		11,164	5–1
7	February 1, 2019	Saskatchewan Rush	Scotiabank Arena	W 16–13		8,071	6–1
8	February 15, 2019	San Diego Seals	Scotiabank Arena	W 12–11		8,167	7–1
9	February 24, 2019	@ New England Black Wolves	Mohegan Sun Arena	L 11–13		5,691	7–2
10	March 9, 2019	@ Calgary Roughnecks	Scotiabank Saddledome	L 9–15		10,674	7–3
11	March 16, 2019	Rochester Knighthawks	Scotiabank Arena	W 15–13		12,873	8–3
12	March 22, 2019	@ Georgia Swarm	Infinite Energy Arena	L 5–14		7,933	8–4
13	March 23, 2019	@ Buffalo Bandits	KeyBank Center	L 6–8		16,580	8–5
14	March 30, 2019	Philadelphia Wings	Scotiabank Arena	W 12–11		11,244	9–5
15	April 5, 2019	Buffalo Bandits	Scotiabank Arena	W 12–11	OT	9,565	10–5
16	April 6, 2019	@ Rochester Knighthawks	Blue Cross Arena	L 10–12		4,997	10–6
17	April 12, 2019	New England Black Wolves	Scotiabank Arena	W 13–12		9,829	11–6
18	April 26, 2019	@ Vancouver Warriors	Rogers Arena	W 15–9		6,685	12–6

=== Playoffs ===
Game	Date	Opponent	Location	Score	OT	Attendance	Record
Eastern Division Semi-final	May 6, 2019	@ Georgia Swarm	Infinite Energy Arena	W 16–14		8,862	1–0
Eastern Division final	May 11, 2019	@ Buffalo Bandits	KeyBank Center	L 8–12		11,635	1–1

== Roster ==
Toronto Rock roster
Active (21-man) roster		Inactive roster	Coaches
Goaltenders: 1 (Canada) Riley Hutchcraft; 66 (Canada) Nick Rose; Defensemen: 4 (Canada) David Brock; 71 (Canada) Sheldon Burns; 13 (Canada) Scott Dominey; 91 (Canada) Bill Hostrawser (A); 47 (Canada) Adam Jay; 33 (Canada) Josh Jubenville; 20 (Canada) Bradley Kri (A); 11 (Canada) Taylor Stuart; 15 (Canada) Alex Tulett	Forwards: 25 (Canada) Dan Craig; 6 (Canada) Dan Dawson; 17 (Canada) Aaron Forster; 10 (Canada) Rob Hellyer (A); 2 (Canada) Zach Manns; 18 (Haudenosaunee) Johnny Powless; 97 (Canada) Reid Reinholdt; 26 (United States) Tom Schreiber (A); Transition: 23 (Canada) Challen Rogers (C)	Practice squad: 9 (Canada) Mitchell Gustavsen (D); 47 (Canada) Adam Jay (D); 14 (Canada) Brad Lyons (D); 13 (Canada) Scott Dominey (T); Injured reserve: 16 (Canada) Adam Jones (F); 61 (Canada) Brandon Slade (D); 93 (Canada) Latrell Harris (D); Holdout: 2 (Canada) AJ Kluck; Protected list: 99 (United States) Paul Rabil (T); Unable to play: 3 (Canada) Brock Sorensen	Head coach: Matt Sawyer; Assistant coaches: Bruce Codd; Blaine Manning; Brandon Miller; Legend: * Suspended list; (C) Captain; (A) Alternate captain; Roster updated 2019-03-13; NLL Transactions

== See also ==
- 2019 NLL season
