= 2019 Saskatchewan Rush season =

2019 Saskatchewan Rush
- League: NLL
- Division: 1st West
- 2019 record: 11-7
- Home record: 7-2
- Road record: 4-5
- Goals for: 222
- Goals against: 202
- General Manager: Derek Keenan
- Coach: Derek Keenan
- Captain: Chris Corbeil
- Alternate captains: Brett Mydske; Kyle Rubisch
- Arena: SaskTel Centre

The Saskatchewan Rush are a lacrosse team based in Saskatoon, Saskatchewan playing in the National Lacrosse League (NLL). The 2019 season was the 14th in franchise history, 4th in Saskatchewan.

== Current standings ==
East Division
P	Team	GP	W	L	PCT	GB	Home	Road	GF	GA	Diff	GF/GP	GA/GP
1	Buffalo Bandits – xyz	18	14	4	.778	0.0	7–2	7–2	244	186	+58	13.56	10.33
2	Georgia Swarm – x	18	12	6	.667	2.0	7–2	5–4	230	210	+20	12.78	11.67
3	Toronto Rock – x	18	12	6	.667	2.0	8–1	4–5	213	207	+6	11.83	11.50
4	New England Black Wolves – x	18	9	9	.500	5.0	7–2	2–7	213	223	−10	11.83	12.39
5	Rochester Knighthawks	18	6	12	.333	8.0	4–5	2–7	212	226	−14	11.78	12.56
6	Philadelphia Wings	18	4	14	.222	10.0	3–6	1–8	218	246	−28	12.11	13.67

West Division
P	Team	GP	W	L	PCT	GB	Home	Road	GF	GA	Diff	GF/GP	GA/GP
1	Saskatchewan Rush – xy	18	11	7	.611	0.0	7–2	4–5	222	202	+20	12.33	11.22
2	San Diego Seals – x	18	10	8	.556	1.0	6–3	4–5	208	217	−9	11.56	12.06
3	Calgary Roughnecks – x	18	10	8	.556	1.0	5–4	5–4	212	201	+11	11.78	11.17
4	Colorado Mammoth – x	18	6	12	.333	5.0	3–6	3–6	181	193	−12	10.06	10.72
5	Vancouver Warriors	18	5	13	.278	6.0	3–6	2–7	179	221	−42	9.94	12.28

x: Clinched playoff berth; c: Clinched playoff berth by crossing over to another division; y: Clinched division; z: Clinched best regular season record; GP: Games Played
W: Wins; L: Losses; GB: Games back; PCT: Win percentage; Home: Record at Home; Road: Record on the Road; GF: Goals scored; GA: Goals allowed
Differential: Difference between goals scored and allowed; GF/GP: Average number of goals scored per game; GA/GP: Average number of goals allowed per game

== Game log ==
=== Regular season ===
Game	Date	Opponent	Location	Score	OT	Attendance	Record
1	December 28, 2018	@ New England Black Wolves	Mohegan Sun Arena	L 11–12		6,445	0–1
2	January 5, 2019	San Diego Seals	SaskTel Centre	W 16–12		13,713	1–1
3	January 12, 2019	@ Vancouver Warriors	Rogers Arena	W 14–10		8,217	2–1
4	January 19, 2019	Rochester Knighthawks	SaskTel Centre	W 12–7		13,590	3–1
5	January 27, 2019	@ Georgia Swarm	Infinite Energy Arena	L 10–13		3,775	3–2
6	February 1, 2019	@ Toronto Rock	Scotiabank Arena	L 13–16		8,071	3–3
7	February 9, 2019	Calgary Roughnecks	SaskTel Centre	L 12–17		13,426	3–4
8	February 16, 2019	@ Vancouver Warriors	Rogers Arena	W 15–13		7,247	4–4
9	February 22, 2019	Colorado Mammoth	SaskTel Centre	W 9–7		12,462	5–4
10	March 2, 2019	Calgary Roughnecks	SaskTel Centre	W 15–9		12,814	6–4
11	March 16, 2019	Buffalo Bandits	SaskTel Centre	L 11–12	OT	13,291	6–5
12	March 22, 2019	@ San Diego Seals	Valley View Casino Center	L 12–13		6,163	6–6
13	March 30, 2019	Vancouver Warriors	SaskTel Centre	W 12–9		13,970	7–6
14	April 6, 2019	@ Colorado Mammoth	Pepsi Center	W 9–7		12,841	8–6
15	April 12, 2019	@ San Diego Seals	Valley View Casino Center	W 14–8		6,245	9–6
16	April 13, 2019	Philadelphia Wings	SaskTel Centre	W 16–11		14,005	10–6
17	April 20, 2019	@ Calgary Roughnecks	Scotiabank Saddledome	L 8–18		19,289	10–7
18	April 27, 2019	Colorado Mammoth	SaskTel Centre	W 13–8		13,860	11–7

=== Playoffs ===
Game	Date	Opponent	Location	Score	OT	Attendance	Record
Western division semi-final	May 3, 2019	Colorado Mammoth	SaskTel Centre	L 10–11	OT	11,658	0–1

== Current roster ==
Saskatchewan Rush roster
Active (21-man) roster		Inactive roster	Coaches
Goaltenders: 31 (Canada) Adam Shute; 35 (Canada) Evan Kirk; Defensemen: 13 (Canada) Jeff Cornwall; 20 (Canada) Travis Cornwall; 24 (Canada) Ryan Dilks (A); 70 (Canada) Holden Garlent; 94 (Canada) Matt Hossack; 65 (Canada) Ryan McLean; 8 (Canada) Mike Messenger; 53 (Canada) Justin Robinson; 4 (Canada) Kyle Rubisch (A)	Forwards: 17 (Canada) Robert Church; 32 (Canada) Matthew Dinsdale; 15 (Canada) Ryan Keenan; 9 (Canada) Curtis Knight; 42 (Canada) Mark Matthews (A); 90 (Canada) Ben McIntosh (A); 11 (Canada) Austin Murphy; 3 (Canada) Connor Robinson; 77 (Haudenosaunee) Jeff Shattler; Transition: 16 (Canada) Chris Corbeil (C); 61 (Canada) Nick Finlay; 19 (Canada) Jordi Jones-Smith; 74 (Haudenosaunee) Jeremy Thompson	Practice squad: 88 (Canada) Cameron Dunkerley (G); 12 (Canada) Zach Gould (F); 44 (Canada) Tanner Thomson (F); Protected list: 23 (Canada) Ryan Dilks; 13 (Canada) Jeff Cornwall	Head coach: Derek Keenan; Assistant coaches: Jeff McComb - Offensive Coach; Jimmy Quinlan - Defensive Coach; Legend: * Suspended list; (C) Captain; (A) Alternate captain; Roster updated 2019-04-18; NLL Transactions

== See also ==
- 2019 NLL season
