= 2019 Vancouver Warriors season =

2019 Vancouver Warriors
- League: NLL
- Division: 5th West
- 2019 record: 5–13
- Home record: 3–6
- Road record: 2–7
- Goals for: 179
- Goals against: 221
- General Manager: Dan Richardson
- Coach: Chris Gill
- Captain: Brett Mydske
- Alternate captains: Mitch Jones/ Tyler Codron
- Arena: Rogers Arena

The Vancouver Warriors are a lacrosse team based in Vancouver, British Columbia. The team plays in the National Lacrosse League (NLL). The 2019 season is the 20th in franchise history and the 6th season in Vancouver. The franchise previously played in Everett, Washington, San Jose, and Albany, New York. They were the Vancouver Stealth but changed their team name during the off season to the Vancouver Warriors for 2019 season.

== Regular season ==
=== Final standings ===
East Division
P	Team	GP	W	L	PCT	GB	Home	Road	GF	GA	Diff	GF/GP	GA/GP
1	Buffalo Bandits – xyz	18	14	4	.778	0.0	7–2	7–2	244	186	+58	13.56	10.33
2	Georgia Swarm – x	18	12	6	.667	2.0	7–2	5–4	230	210	+20	12.78	11.67
3	Toronto Rock – x	18	12	6	.667	2.0	8–1	4–5	213	207	+6	11.83	11.50
4	New England Black Wolves – x	18	9	9	.500	5.0	7–2	2–7	213	223	−10	11.83	12.39
5	Rochester Knighthawks	18	6	12	.333	8.0	4–5	2–7	212	226	−14	11.78	12.56
6	Philadelphia Wings	18	4	14	.222	10.0	3–6	1–8	218	246	−28	12.11	13.67

West Division
P	Team	GP	W	L	PCT	GB	Home	Road	GF	GA	Diff	GF/GP	GA/GP
1	Saskatchewan Rush – xy	18	11	7	.611	0.0	7–2	4–5	222	202	+20	12.33	11.22
2	San Diego Seals – x	18	10	8	.556	1.0	6–3	4–5	208	217	−9	11.56	12.06
3	Calgary Roughnecks – x	18	10	8	.556	1.0	5–4	5–4	212	201	+11	11.78	11.17
4	Colorado Mammoth – x	18	6	12	.333	5.0	3–6	3–6	181	193	−12	10.06	10.72
5	Vancouver Warriors	18	5	13	.278	6.0	3–6	2–7	179	221	−42	9.94	12.28

x: Clinched playoff berth; c: Clinched playoff berth by crossing over to another division; y: Clinched division; z: Clinched best regular season record; GP: Games Played
W: Wins; L: Losses; GB: Games back; PCT: Win percentage; Home: Record at Home; Road: Record on the Road; GF: Goals scored; GA: Goals allowed
Differential: Difference between goals scored and allowed; GF/GP: Average number of goals scored per game; GA/GP: Average number of goals allowed per game

=== Game log ===
Game	Date	Opponent	Location	Score	OT	Attendance	Record
1	December 15, 2018	@ Calgary Roughnecks	Scotiabank Saddledome	W 14–13	OT	10,804	1–0
2	December 21, 2018	Calgary Roughnecks	Rogers Arena	L 8–14		9,902	1–1
3	December 28, 2018	@ Buffalo Bandits	KeyBank Center	L 10–16		12,005	1–2
4	January 5, 2019	@ Georgia Swarm	Infinite Energy Arena	L 8–10		4,975	1–3
5	January 12, 2019	Saskatchewan Rush	Rogers Arena	L 10–14		8,217	1–4
6	January 19, 2019	San Diego Seals	Rogers Arena	L 10–11		6,051	1–5
7	January 26, 2019	Colorado Mammoth	Rogers Arena	W 11–10	OT	6,630	2–5
8	February 2, 2019	@ Calgary Roughnecks	Scotiabank Saddledome	L 5–8		10,817	2–6
9	February 8, 2019	@ San Diego Seals	Valley View Casino Center	W 14–6		8,706	3–6
10	February 16, 2019	Saskatchewan Rush	Rogers Arena	L 13–15		7,247	3–7
11	March 2, 2019	@ San Diego Seals	Valley View Casino Center	L 10–13		9,117	3–8
12	March 16, 2019	New England Black Wolves	Rogers Arena	W 12–9		5,769	4–8
13	March 22, 2019	Colorado Mammoth	Rogers Arena	L 7–11		5,800	4–9
14	March 23, 2019	@ Colorado Mammoth	Pepsi Center	L 4–14		12,826	4–10
15	March 30, 2019	@ Saskatchewan Rush	SaskTel Centre	L 9–12		13,970	4–11
16	April 14, 2019	Philadelphia Wings	Rogers Arena	W 19–12		5,200	5–11
17	April 20, 2019	@ Rochester Knighthawks	Blue Cross Arena	L 6–18		5,376	5–12
18	April 26, 2019	Toronto Rock	Rogers Arena	L 9–15		6,685	5–13

== Roster ==
Vancouver Warriors roster
Active (21-man) roster		Inactive roster	Coaches
Goaltenders: 00 (Canada) Alexis Buque; 39 (Canada) Steve Fryer; Defensemen: 27 (Canada) Owen Barker; 2 (Canada) Brett Mydske; 3 (Canada) Garrett McIntosh; 28 (Canada) Reid Bowering; 71 (Canada) Taylor Stuart; 81 (Canada) Anthony Kalinich; 7 (Canada) Tyler Codron; 39 (Canada) Tyrell Hamer-Jackson; 13 (Canada) Tyson Roe; 19 (Canada) Justin Salt; 42 (Canada) Derek Lloyd	Forwards: 45 (Canada) Keegan Bal; 14 (Canada) Brandon Goodwin; 16 (Canada) Mitch Jones; 89 (Canada) Riley Loewen; 11 (Scotland) Jordan McBride; 67 (Canada) Kyle Killen; 18 (Canada) Logan Schuss; 32 (Canada) Matthew Dinsdale; 8 (Canada) Adam Charalambides; 96 (Canada) Ryan Martel	Practice squad: 23 (Canada) Keegan Bell (F); 41 (Canada) Isaac Bot (D/T); 97 (Canada) Lyndon Bunio (F); 36 (Canada) Brody Harris (G)	Head coach: Chris Gill; Assistant coaches: Kaleb Toth; Curtis Hodgson; Legend: * Suspended list; (C) Captain; (A) Alternate captain; NLL Transactions
