= 2019 Colorado Mammoth season =

Sports season

2019 Colorado Mammoth
- League: NLL
- Division: 4th West
- 2019 record: 6-12
- Home record: 3-6
- Road record: 3-6
- Goals for: 181
- Goals against: 193
- General Manager: Dan Carey
- Coach: Dan Stroup, Pat Coyle, Chris Gill
- Captain: Dan Coates
- Alternate captains: Joey Cupido; Robert Hope
- Arena: Pepsi Center

The Colorado Mammoth are a lacrosse team based in Denver, Colorado playing in the National Lacrosse League (NLL). The 2019 season is the 33rd in franchise history and 17th as the Mammoth (previously the Washington Power, Pittsburgh Crossefire, and Baltimore Thunder).

== Final standings ==
East Division
P	Team	GP	W	L	PCT	GB	Home	Road	GF	GA	Diff	GF/GP	GA/GP
1	Buffalo Bandits – xyz	18	14	4	.778	0.0	7–2	7–2	244	186	+58	13.56	10.33
2	Georgia Swarm – x	18	12	6	.667	2.0	7–2	5–4	230	210	+20	12.78	11.67
3	Toronto Rock – x	18	12	6	.667	2.0	8–1	4–5	213	207	+6	11.83	11.50
4	New England Black Wolves – x	18	9	9	.500	5.0	7–2	2–7	213	223	−10	11.83	12.39
5	Rochester Knighthawks	18	6	12	.333	8.0	4–5	2–7	212	226	−14	11.78	12.56
6	Philadelphia Wings	18	4	14	.222	10.0	3–6	1–8	218	246	−28	12.11	13.67

West Division
P	Team	GP	W	L	PCT	GB	Home	Road	GF	GA	Diff	GF/GP	GA/GP
1	Saskatchewan Rush – xy	18	11	7	.611	0.0	7–2	4–5	222	202	+20	12.33	11.22
2	San Diego Seals – x	18	10	8	.556	1.0	6–3	4–5	208	217	−9	11.56	12.06
3	Calgary Roughnecks – x	18	10	8	.556	1.0	5–4	5–4	212	201	+11	11.78	11.17
4	Colorado Mammoth – x	18	6	12	.333	5.0	3–6	3–6	181	193	−12	10.06	10.72
5	Vancouver Warriors	18	5	13	.278	6.0	3–6	2–7	179	221	−42	9.94	12.28

x: Clinched playoff berth; c: Clinched playoff berth by crossing over to another division; y: Clinched division; z: Clinched best regular season record; GP: Games Played
W: Wins; L: Losses; GB: Games back; PCT: Win percentage; Home: Record at Home; Road: Record on the Road; GF: Goals scored; GA: Goals allowed
Differential: Difference between goals scored and allowed; GF/GP: Average number of goals scored per game; GA/GP: Average number of goals allowed per game

=== Regular season ===
Game	Date	Opponent	Location	Score	OT	Attendance	Record
1	December 22, 2018	San Diego Seals	Pepsi Center	L 12–17		13,407	0–1
2	January 6, 2019	Calgary Roughnecks	Pepsi Center	L 8–11		11,378	0–2
3	January 12, 2019	Toronto Rock	Pepsi Center	L 10–11		11,678	0–3
4	January 20, 2019	Calgary Roughnecks	Pepsi Center	W 12–7		11,101	1–3
5	January 26, 2019	@ Vancouver Warriors	Rogers Arena	L 10–11	OT	6,630	1–4
6	February 2, 2019	@ Buffalo Bandits	KeyBank Center	L 12–16		10,766	1–5
7	February 9, 2019	@ Philadelphia Wings	Wells Fargo Center (Philadelphia)	W 12–10		10,505	2–5
8	February 16, 2019	Georgia Swarm	Pepsi Center	W 10–8		12,958	3–5
9	February 22, 2019	@ Saskatchewan Rush	SaskTel Centre	L 7–9		12,462	3–6
10	March 3, 2019	@ New England Black Wolves	Mohegan Sun Arena	L 11–17		4,954	3–7
11	March 9, 2019	San Diego Seals	Pepsi Center	L 10–13		15,951	3–8
12	March 16, 2019	@ Calgary Roughnecks	Scotiabank Saddledome	W 11–9		13,946	4–8
13	March 22, 2019	@ Vancouver Warriors	Rogers Arena	W 11–7		5,800	5–8
14	March 23, 2019	Vancouver Warriors	Pepsi Center	W 14–4		12,826	6–8
15	April 6, 2019	Saskatchewan Rush	Pepsi Center	L 7–9		12,841	6–9
16	April 12, 2019	Rochester Knighthawks	Pepsi Center	L 9–10	OT	13,202	6–10
17	April 20, 2019	@ San Diego Seals	Valley View Casino Center	L 7–12		5,121	6–11
18	April 27, 2019	@ Saskatchewan Rush	SaskTel Centre	L 8–13		13,860	6–12

=== Playoffs ===
Game	Date	Opponent	Location	Score	OT	Attendance	Record
Western division semi-final	May 3, 2019	@ Saskatchewan Rush	SaskTel Centre	W 11–10	OT	11,658	1–0
Western division final	May 10, 2019	@ Calgary Roughnecks	Scotiabank Saddledome	L 4–8			1–1

== Roster ==
Colorado Mammoth roster
Active (21-man) roster		Inactive roster	Coaches
Goaltenders: 39 (Canada) Steve Fryer; 45 (Canada) Dillon Ward; Defensemen: 8 (United States) Brent Adams; 37 (Canada) Dan Coates (C); 82 (Canada) Joey Cupido (A); 27 (Canada) Scott Carnegie; 3 (United States) Tim Edwards; 94 (Canada) Julian Garritano; 23 (Canada) Jordan Gilles; 18 (Canada) Robert Hope (A); 86 (Canada) John Lintz; 25 (Canada) Brad Self; 4 (Canada) Josh Sullivan; 11 (Canada) Taylor Stuart	Forwards: 7 (Canada) Ryan Benesch; 28 (Canada) Stephen Keogh; 16 (Canada) Ryan Lee; 51 (Canada) Eli McLaughlin; 35 (Canada) Jeremy Noble; 20 (Canada) Jacob Ruest; 17 (Canada) Chris Wardle	Practice squad: 42 (Canada) Rowan Kelly; 67 (Canada) Kyle Killen; 54 (Canada) Steven Lee; 71 (Canada) Jeff Wittig	Head coach: Pat Coyle; Assistant coaches: Andrew McBride; Shawn Williams; Legend: * Suspended list; (C) Captain; (A) Alternate captain; Roster updated 2018-01-02; NLL Transactions

== See also ==
- 2019 NLL season
