= 2019 Georgia Swarm season =

National Lacrosse League season

2019 Georgia Swarm
- League: NLL
- Division: 2nd East
- 2019 record: 12-6
- Home record: 7-2
- Road record: 5-4
- Goals for: 230
- Goals against: 210
- General Manager: John J. Arlotta
- Coach: Ed Comeau
- Captain: Jordan MacIntosh
- Alternate captains: Shayne Jackson; Jason Noble
- Arena: Infinite Energy Arena

The 2019 Georgia Swarm season is the 4th season of the Georgia Swarm, a lacrosse team based in Duluth, Georgia playing in the National Lacrosse League. The team was formerly based in Saint Paul, Minnesota and was known as the Minnesota Swarm.

== Regular season ==
=== Final standings ===
East Division
P	Team	GP	W	L	PCT	GB	Home	Road	GF	GA	Diff	GF/GP	GA/GP
1	Buffalo Bandits – xyz	18	14	4	.778	0.0	7–2	7–2	244	186	+58	13.56	10.33
2	Georgia Swarm – x	18	12	6	.667	2.0	7–2	5–4	230	210	+20	12.78	11.67
3	Toronto Rock – x	18	12	6	.667	2.0	8–1	4–5	213	207	+6	11.83	11.50
4	New England Black Wolves – x	18	9	9	.500	5.0	7–2	2–7	213	223	−10	11.83	12.39
5	Rochester Knighthawks	18	6	12	.333	8.0	4–5	2–7	212	226	−14	11.78	12.56
6	Philadelphia Wings	18	4	14	.222	10.0	3–6	1–8	218	246	−28	12.11	13.67

West Division
P	Team	GP	W	L	PCT	GB	Home	Road	GF	GA	Diff	GF/GP	GA/GP
1	Saskatchewan Rush – xy	18	11	7	.611	0.0	7–2	4–5	222	202	+20	12.33	11.22
2	San Diego Seals – x	18	10	8	.556	1.0	6–3	4–5	208	217	−9	11.56	12.06
3	Calgary Roughnecks – x	18	10	8	.556	1.0	5–4	5–4	212	201	+11	11.78	11.17
4	Colorado Mammoth – x	18	6	12	.333	5.0	3–6	3–6	181	193	−12	10.06	10.72
5	Vancouver Warriors	18	5	13	.278	6.0	3–6	2–7	179	221	−42	9.94	12.28

x: Clinched playoff berth; c: Clinched playoff berth by crossing over to another division; y: Clinched division; z: Clinched best regular season record; GP: Games Played
W: Wins; L: Losses; GB: Games back; PCT: Win percentage; Home: Record at Home; Road: Record on the Road; GF: Goals scored; GA: Goals allowed
Differential: Difference between goals scored and allowed; GF/GP: Average number of goals scored per game; GA/GP: Average number of goals allowed per game

=== Game log ===
Game	Date	Opponent	Location	Score	OT	Attendance	Record
1	December 15, 2018	New England Black Wolves	Infinite Energy Arena	W 16–12		4,943	1–0
2	December 28, 2018	@ Toronto Rock	Scotiabank Arena	W 12–11		10,123	2–0
3	January 5, 2019	Vancouver Warriors	Infinite Energy Arena	W 10–8		4,975	3–0
4	January 12, 2019	@ Philadelphia Wings	Wells Fargo Center (Philadelphia)	W 13–11		12,688	4–0
5	January 18, 2019	@ Toronto Rock	Scotiabank Arena	L 9–14		7,118	4–1
6	January 19, 2019	@ New England Black Wolves	Mohegan Sun Arena	L 12–13		4,393	4–2
7	January 27, 2019	Saskatchewan Rush	Infinite Energy Arena	W 13–10		3,775	5–2
8	February 1, 2019	New England Black Wolves	Infinite Energy Arena	W 10–8		4,405	6–2
9	February 2, 2019	@ Rochester Knighthawks	Blue Cross Arena	W 16–12		7,478	7–2
10	February 9, 2019	Buffalo Bandits	Infinite Energy Arena	L 9–19		7,767	7–3
11	February 16, 2019	@ Colorado Mammoth	Pepsi Center	L 8–10		12,958	7–4
12	March 2, 2019	Rochester Knighthawks	Infinite Energy Arena	W 15–11		8,410	8–4
13	March 9, 2019	@ Buffalo Bandits	KeyBank Center	W 14–9		15,061	9–4
14	March 15, 2019	@ Rochester Knighthawks	Blue Cross Arena	W 15–14		5,428	10–4
15	March 22, 2019	Toronto Rock	Infinite Energy Arena	W 14–5		7,933	11–4
16	April 5, 2019	San Diego Seals	Infinite Energy Arena	W 17–10		9,344	12–4
17	April 12, 2019	@ Calgary Roughnecks	Scotiabank Saddledome	L 13–14		11,826	12–5
18	April 20, 2019	Philadelphia Wings	Infinite Energy Arena	L 14–19		8,735	12–6

=== Playoffs ===
Game	Date	Opponent	Location	Score	OT	Attendance	Record
Eastern division semi-final	May 6, 2019	Toronto Rock	Infinite Energy Arena	L 14–16			0–1

== Roster ==
Georgia Swarm roster
Active (21-man) roster		Inactive roster	Coaches
Goaltenders: 29 (Canada) Kevin Orleman; 30 (Canada) Mike Poulin; Defensemen: 10 (Canada) Alex Crepinsek; 33 (United States) Matt Dunn; 45 (Canada) Jason Noble (A); 31 (United States) John Ranagan; 13 (Canada) Connor Sellars; 25 (Canada) Leo Stouros; 27 (Canada) Adam Wiedemann	Forwards: 21 (Haudenosaunee) Brendan Bomberry; 9 (Canada) Holden Cattoni; 32 (Canada) Shayne Jackson (A); 83 (Haudenosaunee) Randy Staats; 22 (Haudenosaunee) Jerome Thompson; 4 (Haudenosaunee) Lyle Thompson; 2 (Haudenosaunee) Miles Thompson; 5 (Canada) Joel Tinney; Transition: 44 (Canada) Chad Tutton; 55 (Canada) Bryan Cole; 24 (Canada) Jordan MacIntosh (C); 28 (Haudenosaunee) Zed Williams	Practice squad: 1 (Germany) Craig Wende; 17 (Canada) Tyler Ferriera; 34 (Canada) Steven Orleman; 38 (Haudenosaunee) LeRoy Halftown	Head coach: Ed Comeau; Assistant coaches: Sean Ferris; Dan Ladouceur; Legend: * Suspended list; (C) Captain; (A) Alternate captain; Roster updated 2019-07-01; NLL Transactions

=== Entry Draft ===
The 2018 NLL Entry Draft took place on September 25, 2018. The Swarm made the following selections:

Round	Overall	Player	College/Club
1	7	Brendan Bomberry	
1	8	Adam Wiedemann	
2	18	Joel Tinney	
2	19	Steven Orleman	
2	20	LeRoy Halftown	
4	46	Justin Lemcke	
4	47	John Sexton	
5	60	Tanner Poole	
5	61	Nolan Apers	
6	71	Sawyer Howell	

== See also ==
- 2019 NLL season
