= 2019 San Diego Seals season =

2019 San Diego Seals
- League: NLL
- Division: 2nd West
- 2019 record: 10-8
- Home record: 6-3
- Road record: 4-5
- Goals for: 208
- Goals against: 217
- General Manager: Patrick Merrill
- Coach: Patrick Merrill
- Captain: Brodie Merrill
- Alternate captains: Kyle Buchanan Cam Holding
- Arena: Pechanga Arena

The San Diego Seals are a lacrosse team based in San Diego, California. The team plays in the National Lacrosse League (NLL). The 2019 season was their inaugural season in the NLL.

== Regular season ==
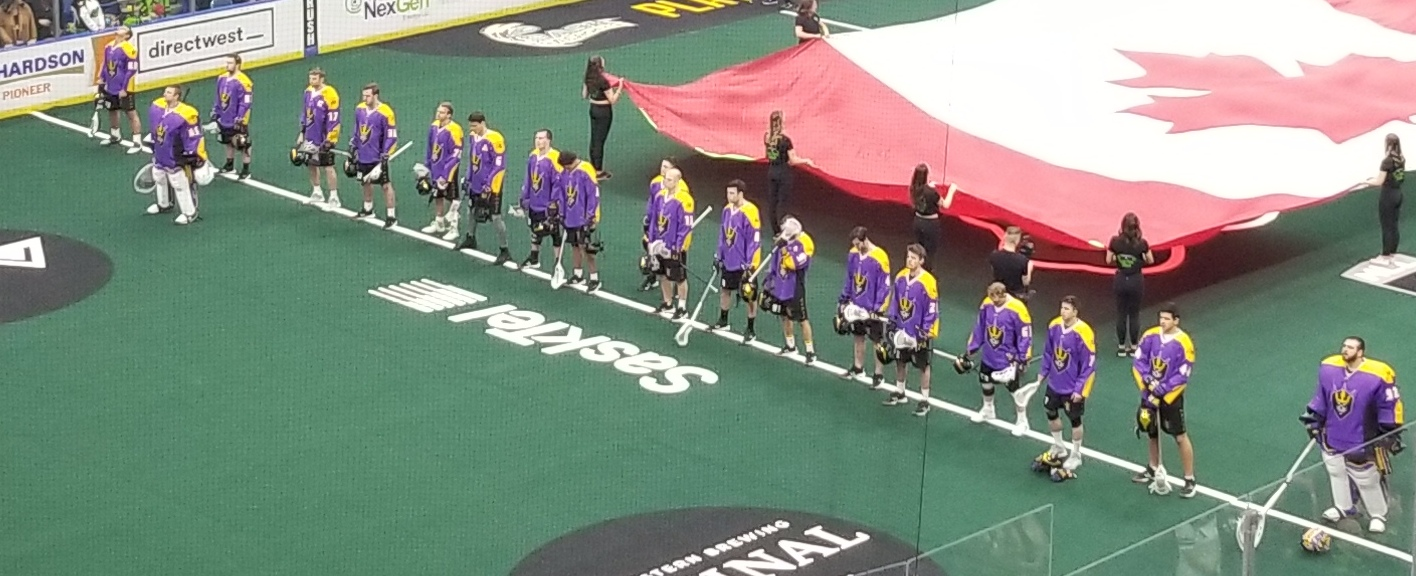
The San Diego Seals playing at the SaskTel Centre in 2019

=== Final standings ===
East Division
P	Team	GP	W	L	PCT	GB	Home	Road	GF	GA	Diff	GF/GP	GA/GP
1	Buffalo Bandits – xyz	18	14	4	.778	0.0	7–2	7–2	244	186	+58	13.56	10.33
2	Georgia Swarm – x	18	12	6	.667	2.0	7–2	5–4	230	210	+20	12.78	11.67
3	Toronto Rock – x	18	12	6	.667	2.0	8–1	4–5	213	207	+6	11.83	11.50
4	New England Black Wolves – x	18	9	9	.500	5.0	7–2	2–7	213	223	−10	11.83	12.39
5	Rochester Knighthawks	18	6	12	.333	8.0	4–5	2–7	212	226	−14	11.78	12.56
6	Philadelphia Wings	18	4	14	.222	10.0	3–6	1–8	218	246	−28	12.11	13.67

West Division
P	Team	GP	W	L	PCT	GB	Home	Road	GF	GA	Diff	GF/GP	GA/GP
1	Saskatchewan Rush – xy	18	11	7	.611	0.0	7–2	4–5	222	202	+20	12.33	11.22
2	San Diego Seals – x	18	10	8	.556	1.0	6–3	4–5	208	217	−9	11.56	12.06
3	Calgary Roughnecks – x	18	10	8	.556	1.0	5–4	5–4	212	201	+11	11.78	11.17
4	Colorado Mammoth – x	18	6	12	.333	5.0	3–6	3–6	181	193	−12	10.06	10.72
5	Vancouver Warriors	18	5	13	.278	6.0	3–6	2–7	179	221	−42	9.94	12.28

x: Clinched playoff berth; c: Clinched playoff berth by crossing over to another division; y: Clinched division; z: Clinched best regular season record; GP: Games Played
W: Wins; L: Losses; GB: Games back; PCT: Win percentage; Home: Record at Home; Road: Record on the Road; GF: Goals scored; GA: Goals allowed
Differential: Difference between goals scored and allowed; GF/GP: Average number of goals scored per game; GA/GP: Average number of goals allowed per game

== Game log ==
=== Regular season ===
Game	Date	Opponent	Location	Score	OT	Attendance	Record
1	December 22, 2018	@ Colorado Mammoth	Pepsi Center	W 17–12		13,407	1–0
2	December 28, 2018	@ Calgary Roughnecks	Scotiabank Saddledome	L 5–9		12,696	1–1
3	January 5, 2019	@ Saskatchewan Rush	SaskTel Centre	L 12–16		13,713	1–2
4	January 12, 2019	Rochester Knighthawks	Pechanga Arena San Diego	W 12–10		12,075	2–2
5	January 18, 2019	Calgary Roughnecks	Pechanga Arena San Diego	W 15–9		7,283	3–2
6	January 19, 2019	@ Vancouver Warriors	Rogers Arena	W 11–10		6,051	4–2
7	February 8, 2019	Vancouver Warriors	Pechanga Arena San Diego	L 6–14		8,706	4–3
8	February 15, 2019	@ Toronto Rock	Scotiabank Arena	L 11–12		8,167	4–4
9	March 2, 2019	Vancouver Warriors	Pechanga Arena San Diego	W 13–10		9,117	5–4
10	March 9, 2019	@ Colorado Mammoth	Pepsi Center	W 13–10		15,951	6–4
11	March 16, 2019	Philadelphia Wings	Pechanga Arena San Diego	W 13–11		7,606	7–4
12	March 22, 2019	Saskatchewan Rush	Pechanga Arena San Diego	W 13–12		6,163	8–4
13	March 30, 2019	@ Calgary Roughnecks	Scotiabank Saddledome	W 16–9		10,854	9–4
14	April 5, 2019	@ Georgia Swarm	Infinite Energy Arena	L 10–17		9,344	9–5
15	April 6, 2019	@ New England Black Wolves	Mohegan Sun Arena	L 14–17		6,046	9–6
16	April 12, 2019	Saskatchewan Rush	Pechanga Arena San Diego	L 8–14		6,245	9–7
17	April 20, 2019	Colorado Mammoth	Pechanga Arena San Diego	W 12–7		5,121	10–7
18	April 27, 2019	Buffalo Bandits	Pechanga Arena San Diego	L 7–18		8,357	10–8

=== Playoffs ===
Game	Date	Opponent	Location	Score	OT	Attendance	Record
Western division semi-final	May 6, 2019	Calgary Roughnecks	Pechanga Arena San Diego	L 11–12		5,005	0–1

== Roster ==
San Diego Seals roster
Active (21-man) roster		Inactive roster	Coaches
Goaltenders: 39 (Canada) Nick Damude; 92 (England) Frank Scigliano; Defensemen: 44 (Canada) Graydon Bradley; 11 (United States) Mark Glicini; 25 (United States) Eli Gobrecht; 19 (Canada) Cam Holding (A); 3 (Canada) Garrett McIntosh; 17 (Canada) Brodie Merrill (C); 7 (Canada) Tor Reinholdt; 12 (Canada) Matt Sykes	Forwards: 14 (Canada) Wesley Berg; 91 (Canada) Kyle Buchanan (A); 5 (United States) Connor Fields; 88 (Canada) Zack Greer; 81 (Canada) Connor Kearnan; 22 (Canada) Evan Messenger; 45 (Canada) Jeremy Noble; 21 (Canada) Casey Jackson; 83 (Haudenosaunee) Austin Staats; Transition: 2 (Canada) Drew Belgrave; 63 (Canada) Brandon Clelland	Practice squad: 77 (United States) Jules Heningburg; 30 (Canada) Johnny Pearson; 96 (Canada) Dylan Riley	Head coach: Patrick Merrill; Assistant coaches: Josh Sanderson; Bill Greer; Legend: * Suspended list; (C) Captain; (A) Alternate captain; Roster updated 2019-01-18; NLL Transactions

== See also ==
- 2019 NLL season
