= 2019 Rochester Knighthawks season =

2019 Rochester Knighthawks
- League: NLL
- Division: 5th East
- 2019 record: 6-12
- Home record: 4-5
- Road record: 2-7
- Goals for: 212
- Goals against: 226
- General Manager: Curt Styres
- Coach: Mike Hasen
- Captain: Scott Campbell; Cody Jamieson
- Alternate captains: Paul Dawson; Graeme Hossack; Cody Jamieson
- Arena: Blue Cross Arena

The Rochester Knighthawks were a lacrosse team based in Rochester, New York, that played in the National Lacrosse League (NLL). The 2019 season was the 25th and final in franchise history. The roster and personnel were moved to Halifax for the 2020 season to form the Halifax Thunderbirds, while Pegula Sports and Entertainment took over an expansion franchise in Rochester, retaining the team's intellectual property.

== Regular season ==
=== Final standings ===
East Division
P	Team	GP	W	L	PCT	GB	Home	Road	GF	GA	Diff	GF/GP	GA/GP
1	Buffalo Bandits – xyz	18	14	4	.778	0.0	7–2	7–2	244	186	+58	13.56	10.33
2	Georgia Swarm – x	18	12	6	.667	2.0	7–2	5–4	230	210	+20	12.78	11.67
3	Toronto Rock – x	18	12	6	.667	2.0	8–1	4–5	213	207	+6	11.83	11.50
4	New England Black Wolves – x	18	9	9	.500	5.0	7–2	2–7	213	223	−10	11.83	12.39
5	Rochester Knighthawks	18	6	12	.333	8.0	4–5	2–7	212	226	−14	11.78	12.56
6	Philadelphia Wings	18	4	14	.222	10.0	3–6	1–8	218	246	−28	12.11	13.67

West Division
P	Team	GP	W	L	PCT	GB	Home	Road	GF	GA	Diff	GF/GP	GA/GP
1	Saskatchewan Rush – xy	18	11	7	.611	0.0	7–2	4–5	222	202	+20	12.33	11.22
2	San Diego Seals – x	18	10	8	.556	1.0	6–3	4–5	208	217	−9	11.56	12.06
3	Calgary Roughnecks – x	18	10	8	.556	1.0	5–4	5–4	212	201	+11	11.78	11.17
4	Colorado Mammoth – x	18	6	12	.333	5.0	3–6	3–6	181	193	−12	10.06	10.72
5	Vancouver Warriors	18	5	13	.278	6.0	3–6	2–7	179	221	−42	9.94	12.28

x: Clinched playoff berth; c: Clinched playoff berth by crossing over to another division; y: Clinched division; z: Clinched best regular season record; GP: Games Played
W: Wins; L: Losses; GB: Games back; PCT: Win percentage; Home: Record at Home; Road: Record on the Road; GF: Goals scored; GA: Goals allowed
Differential: Difference between goals scored and allowed; GF/GP: Average number of goals scored per game; GA/GP: Average number of goals allowed per game

== Game log ==
Game	Date	Opponent	Location	Score	OT	Attendance	Record
1	December 29, 2018	Philadelphia Wings	Blue Cross Arena	W 13–9		8,144	1–0
2	January 5, 2019	@ Buffalo Bandits	KeyBank Center	L 4–13		12,480	1–1
3	January 12, 2019	@ San Diego Seals	Valley View Casino Center	L 10–12		12,075	1–2
4	January 19, 2019	@ Saskatchewan Rush	SaskTel Centre	L 7–12		13,590	1–3
5	January 26, 2019	Buffalo Bandits	Blue Cross Arena	W 18–13		8,337	2–3
6	February 1, 2019	@ Philadelphia Wings	Wells Fargo Center (Philadelphia)	L 14–15	OT	10,210	2–4
7	February 2, 2019	Georgia Swarm	Blue Cross Arena	L 12–16		7,478	2–5
8	February 9, 2019	@ New England Black Wolves	Mohegan Sun Arena	L 13–16		5,766	2–6
9	February 22, 2019	Buffalo Bandits	Blue Cross Arena	L 9–16		6,672	2–7
10	March 2, 2019	@ Georgia Swarm	Infinite Energy Arena	L 11–15		8,410	2–8
11	March 15, 2019	Georgia Swarm	Blue Cross Arena	L 14–15		5,428	2–9
12	March 16, 2019	@ Toronto Rock	Scotiabank Arena	L 13–15		12,873	2–10
13	March 23, 2019	Calgary Roughnecks	Blue Cross Arena	L 9–12		5,394	2–11
14	March 31, 2019	@ New England Black Wolves	Mohegan Sun Arena	W 13–8		5,545	3–11
15	April 6, 2019	Toronto Rock	Blue Cross Arena	W 12–10		4,977	4–11
16	April 12, 2019	@ Colorado Mammoth	Pepsi Center	W 10–9	OT	13,202	5–11
17	April 20, 2019	Vancouver Warriors	Blue Cross Arena	W 18–6		5,376	6–11
18	April 27, 2019	New England Black Wolves	Blue Cross Arena	L 12–14		6,158	6–12

== Roster ==
Rochester Knighthawks roster
Active (21-man) roster		Inactive roster	Coaches
Goaltenders: 76 (Haudenosaunee) Warren Hill; 55 (Haudenosaunee) Angus Goodleaf; Defensemen: 25 (Canada) James Barclay; 37 (Canada) Scott Campbell (C); 2 (Canada) Paul Dawson (A); 12 (Haudenosaunee) Oran Horn; 4 (Canada) Graeme Hossack (A); 29 (Canada) Ian Llord; 45 (Canada) Luc Magnan; 73 (Haudenosaunee) Leland Powless; 9 (Canada) Darryl Robertson; 20 (Canada) Luke Van Schepen; 21 (Canada) Eric Shewell; 18 (Canada) Jake Withers	Forwards: 3 (Canada) Eric Fannell; 47 (Haudenosaunee) Kyle Jackson; 88 (Haudenosaunee) Cody Jamieson (A); 77 (Haudenosaunee) Quinn Powless; 15 (United States) Joe Resetarits; 96 (Canada) Dylan Riley; 14 (Canada) Pat Saunders; 11 (Canada) Austin Shanks; 23 (Canada) Cory Vitarelli; Transition: 10 (Canada) Brad Gillies	Practice squad: 7 (Canada) Cam Milligan; Injured reserve: 79 (Haudenosaunee) Sid Smith; Unable to play: 13 (Canada) Brandon Robinson	Head coach {{{Head Coach}}} Legend: * Suspended list; (C) Captain; (A) Alternate captain; Roster updated 2019-01-18; NLL Transactions

=== Entry draft ===
The 2018 NLL Entry Draft took place on September 25, 2018. The Knighthawks made the following selections:

Round	Overall	Player	College/Club
1	9	James Barclay	
2	16	Luke Van Schepen	
3	36	Oran Horn	
4	40	Nick Damude	
4	49	Dawson Theede	
5	62	Dylan Riley	
6	73	Leland Powless	

== See also ==
- 2019 NLL season
