= 2019 Philadelphia Wings season =

2019 Philadelphia Wings
- League: NLL
- Division: 6th East
- 2019 record: 4-14
- Home record: 3-6
- Road record: 1-8
- Goals for: 218
- Goals against: 246
- General Manager: Paul Day
- Coach: Paul Day
- Arena: Wells Fargo Center
- Average attendance: 10,905

The Philadelphia Wings are a lacrosse team based in Philadelphia, Pennsylvania playing in the National Lacrosse League (NLL). The 2018-2019 season is their inaugural season in the NLL.

== Regular season ==
=== Final standings ===
East Division
P	Team	GP	W	L	PCT	GB	Home	Road	GF	GA	Diff	GF/GP	GA/GP
1	Buffalo Bandits – xyz	18	14	4	.778	0.0	7–2	7–2	244	186	+58	13.56	10.33
2	Georgia Swarm – x	18	12	6	.667	2.0	7–2	5–4	230	210	+20	12.78	11.67
3	Toronto Rock – x	18	12	6	.667	2.0	8–1	4–5	213	207	+6	11.83	11.50
4	New England Black Wolves – x	18	9	9	.500	5.0	7–2	2–7	213	223	−10	11.83	12.39
5	Rochester Knighthawks	18	6	12	.333	8.0	4–5	2–7	212	226	−14	11.78	12.56
6	Philadelphia Wings	18	4	14	.222	10.0	3–6	1–8	218	246	−28	12.11	13.67

West Division
P	Team	GP	W	L	PCT	GB	Home	Road	GF	GA	Diff	GF/GP	GA/GP
1	Saskatchewan Rush – xy	18	11	7	.611	0.0	7–2	4–5	222	202	+20	12.33	11.22
2	San Diego Seals – x	18	10	8	.556	1.0	6–3	4–5	208	217	−9	11.56	12.06
3	Calgary Roughnecks – x	18	10	8	.556	1.0	5–4	5–4	212	201	+11	11.78	11.17
4	Colorado Mammoth – x	18	6	12	.333	5.0	3–6	3–6	181	193	−12	10.06	10.72
5	Vancouver Warriors	18	5	13	.278	6.0	3–6	2–7	179	221	−42	9.94	12.28

x: Clinched playoff berth; c: Clinched playoff berth by crossing over to another division; y: Clinched division; z: Clinched best regular season record; GP: Games Played
W: Wins; L: Losses; GB: Games back; PCT: Win percentage; Home: Record at Home; Road: Record on the Road; GF: Goals scored; GA: Goals allowed
Differential: Difference between goals scored and allowed; GF/GP: Average number of goals scored per game; GA/GP: Average number of goals allowed per game

== Game log ==
Game	Date	Opponent	Location	Score	OT	Attendance	Record
1	December 15, 2018	Buffalo Bandits	Wells Fargo Center (Philadelphia)	L 15–17		11,023	0–1
2	December 29, 2018	@ Rochester Knighthawks	Blue Cross Arena	L 9–13		8,144	0–2
3	January 4, 2019	@ Toronto Rock	Scotiabank Arena	L 10–11	OT	8,299	0–3
4	January 12, 2019	Georgia Swarm	Wells Fargo Center (Philadelphia)	L 11–13		12,688	0–4
5	January 19, 2019	@ Buffalo Bandits	KeyBank Center	L 10–14		10,509	0–5
6	January 26, 2019	Toronto Rock	Wells Fargo Center (Philadelphia)	L 12–13		11,164	0–6
7	February 1, 2019	Rochester Knighthawks	Wells Fargo Center (Philadelphia)	W 15–14	OT	10,210	1–6
8	February 9, 2019	Colorado Mammoth	Wells Fargo Center (Philadelphia)	L 10–12		10,505	1–7
9	February 16, 2019	New England Black Wolves	Wells Fargo Center (Philadelphia)	W 14–10		10,614	2–7
10	February 17, 2019	@ New England Black Wolves	Mohegan Sun Arena	L 11–17		5,805	2–8
11	March 8, 2019	Buffalo Bandits	Wells Fargo Center (Philadelphia)	L 11–12		10,805	2–9
12	March 16, 2019	@ San Diego Seals	Valley View Casino Center	L 11–13		7,606	2–10
13	March 23, 2019	New England Black Wolves	Wells Fargo Center (Philadelphia)	W 13–8		11,988	3–10
14	March 30, 2019	@ Toronto Rock	Scotiabank Arena	L 11–12		11,244	3–11
15	April 6, 2019	Calgary Roughnecks	Wells Fargo Center (Philadelphia)	L 13–18		9,150	3–12
16	April 13, 2019	@ Saskatchewan Rush	SaskTel Centre	L 11–16		14,005	3–13
17	April 14, 2019	@ Vancouver Warriors	Rogers Arena	L 12–19		5,200	3–14
18	April 20, 2019	@ Georgia Swarm	Infinite Energy Arena	W 19–14		8,735	4–14

== Roster ==
Philadelphia Wings roster
Active (21-man) roster		Inactive roster	Coaches
Goaltenders: 31 (Canada) Zach Higgins; 36 (Canada) Brandon Miller; Defensemen: 29 (Canada) Ian Llord (A); 21 (Canada) Steph Charbonneau; 33 (Canada) Anthony Joaquim; 51 (Canada) Nate Wade; 12 (Canada) Liam Patten; 2 (Canada) Eric Shewell; 94 (Canada) Ryan Wagner; 16 (Canada) Nick Finlay; 41 (Canada) Alex Pace; 55 (United States) Liam Byrnes	Forwards: 1 (United States) Matt Rambo; 10 (United States) Blaze Riorden; 11 (Canada) Brett Hickey; 21 (Canada) Kevin Crowley (A); 23 (Canada) Corey Vitarelli; 27 (Canada) Josh Currier; 72 (United States) Kevin Buchanan; Transition: 9 (United States) Trevor Baptiste; 46 (Canada) Kiel Matisz (C); 26 (United States) Isaiah Davis-Allen	Practice squad: -- (United States) Kyle Marr; -- (United States) Austin Pifani; -- (Canada) Matt Marinier; 93 (Canada) Daryl Waud	Head coach: Paul Day; Assistant coaches: Landon Miller; Legend: * Suspended list; (C) Captain; (A) Alternate captain; Roster updated 2022-05-18; NLL Transactions

=== Entry Draft ===
The 2018 NLL Entry Draft took place on September 25, 2018. The Wings made the following selections:

Round	Overall	Player	College/Club
1	2	Chris Cloutier	
2	14	Trevor Baptiste	
2	25	James Leary	
3	28	Justin Guterding	
3	39	Kyle Staveley	
4	51	Christian Cuccinello	
5	54	Connor Keating	
6	64	Michael Rexrode	

== See also ==
- 2019 NLL season
