= Eli Salama =

Canadian lacrosse player (born 1996)

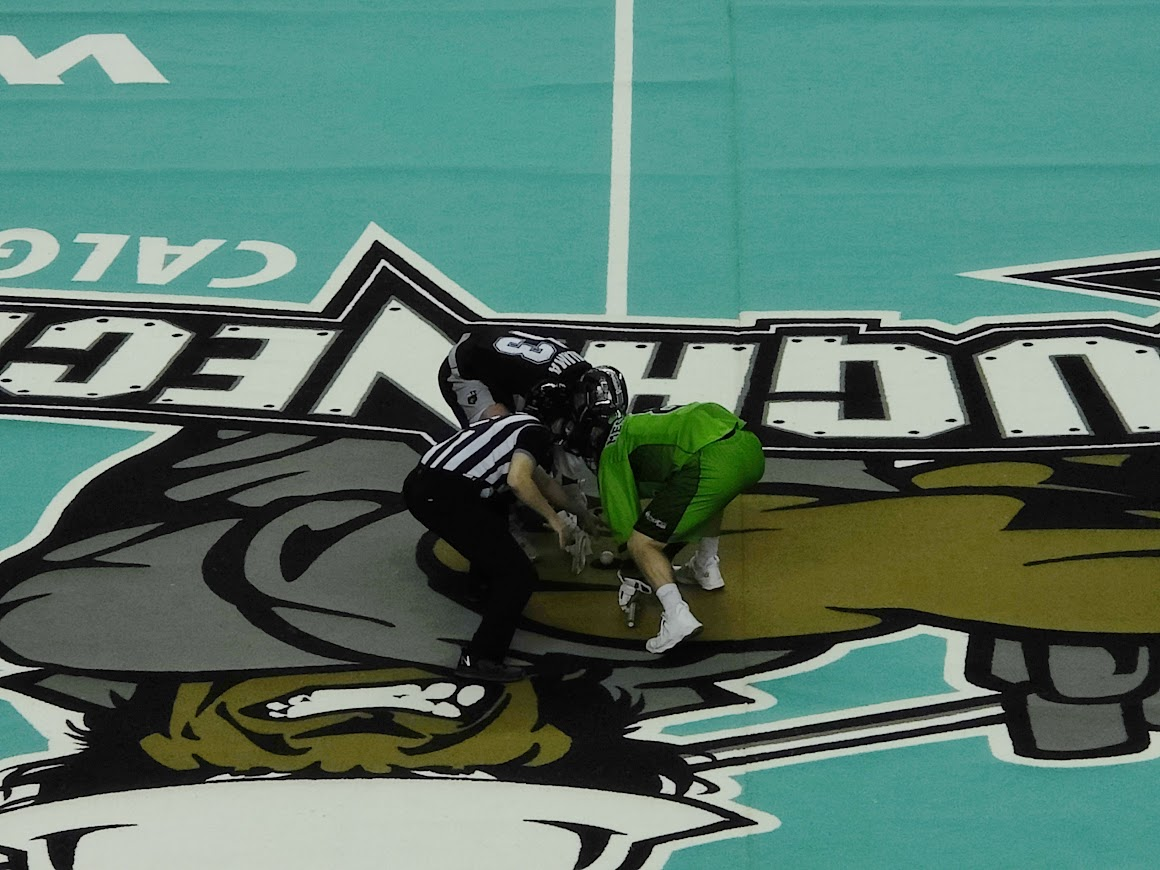
- Salama (left) with the Calgary Roughnecks in 2022

Personal information
- Nationality: Canadian
- Born: August 24, 1996 (age 29) Coquitlam, British Columbia, Canada
- Height: 6 ft 2 in (188 cm)
- Weight: 211 lb (96 kg; 15 st 1 lb)

Sport
- Position: Defence/LSM
- Shoots: Right
- NCAA team: RIT (2018)
- NLL draft: 12th overall, 2018; Calgary Roughnecks
- NLL team: Calgary Roughnecks
- MLL teams: Dallas Rattlers
- PLL team: Denver Outlaws
- Pro career: 2019–

Career highlights
- NCAA: USILA Division III Defenseman of the Year (2018); Liberty League Defenseman of the Year (2018); First team All-American (2018)

Eli Salama (born August 24, 1996) is a Canadian professional lacrosse defenceman playing with and captaining the Calgary Roughnecks of the National Lacrosse League (NLL). He previously played for the Dallas Rattlers of the MLL.

== College career ==
Salama played for the RIT Tigers for four seasons and advanced to the NCAA Championship game with the Tigers 20 2017. In 2018, he was named USILA Division III Long-Pole of the Year, Liberty League Defensive Player of the Year, USILA First Team All-American and All-Liberty League First Team.

== Professional career ==
=== NLL ===
Salama was drafted 12th overall in the 2018 NLL draft by the Calgary Roughnecks and joined the team in the 2019 season, winning an NLL Championship as a rookie.

=== PLL ===
Salama plays long stick midfield for Chrome Lacrosse Club.

== Statistics ==
=== NCAA ===
Season	Team	GP	GS	G	A	Pts	GB	CT
2015	RIT	11	0	0	1	1	4	3
2016	RIT	15	0	0	3	3	14	10
2017	RIT	23	0	4	5	9	44	28
2018	RIT	22	22	10	11	21	51	29
Total		71	22	14	20	34	113	70

=== NLL ===
Eli Salama		Regular season									Playoffs								
Season	Team	GP	G	A	Pts	LB	PIM	Pts/GP	LB/GP	PIM/GP	GP	G	A	Pts	LB	PIM	Pts/GP	LB/GP	PIM/GP
2019	Calgary Roughnecks	16	1	4	5	67	22	0.31	4.19	1.38	4	0	0	0	15	9	0.00	3.75	2.25
2020	Calgary Roughnecks	10	5	7	12	55	13	1.20	5.50	1.30	–	–	–	–	–	–	–	–	–
2022	Calgary Roughnecks	16	2	4	6	84	20	0.38	5.25	1.25	1	1	1	2	9	0	2.00	9.00	0.00
2023	Calgary Roughnecks	18	3	5	8	116	20	0.44	6.44	1.11	4	0	0	0	21	6	0.00	5.25	1.50
2024	Calgary Roughnecks	13	2	8	10	59	22	0.77	4.54	1.69	–	–	–	–	–	–	–	–	–
2025	Calgary Roughnecks	18	0	7	7	128	20	0.39	7.11	1.11	1	0	0	0	6	4	0.00	6.00	4.00
2026	Calgary Roughnecks	18	0	8	8	111	43	0.44	6.17	2.39	–	–	–	–	–	–	–	–	–
		109	13	43	56	620	160	0.51	5.69	1.47	10	1	1	2	51	19	0.20	5.10	1.90
Career Total:		119	14	44	58	671	179	0.49	5.64	1.50									

GP–Games played; G–Goals; A–Assists; Pts–Points; LB–Loose balls; PIM–Penalty minutes; Pts/GP–Points per games played; LB/GP–Loose balls per games played; PIM/GP–Penalty minutes per games played.

=== MLL ===
Season	Team	Regular season											Playoffs										
Season	Team	GP	G	2PG	A	Pts	Sh	GB	Pen	PIM	FOW	FOA	GP	G	2PG	A	Pts	Sh	GB	Pen	PIM	FOW	FOA
2019	Dallas Rattlers	16	5	4	0	9	15	0	6	6	0	0	–	–	–	–	–	–	–	–	–	–	–
		16	5	4	0	9	15	0	6	6	0	0	0	0	0	0	0	0	0	0	0	0	0
Career total:		16	5	4	0	9	15	0	6	6	0	0											

GP–Games played; G–Goals; 2PG–2-point goals; A–Assists; Pts–Points; Sh–Shots; GB–Ground balls; Pen–Penalties; PIM–Penalty minutes; FOW–Faceoffs won; FOA–Faceoffs attempted

=== PLL ===
Season	Team	Regular season											Playoffs										
Season	Team	GP	G	2PG	A	Pts	Sh	GB	Pen	PIM	FOW	FOA	GP	G	2PG	A	Pts	Sh	GB	Pen	PIM	FOW	FOA
2020	Chrome	5	1	1	1	3	4	5	1	1	0	0	–	–	–	–	–	–	–	–	–	–	–
2021	Chrome	1	0	0	0	0	1	0	0	0	0	0	–	–	–	–	–	–	–	–	–	–	–
2022	Chrome	10	3	1	2	6	11	20	3	3	0	0	1	0	0	0	0	0	0	0	0	0	0
2023	Chrome	10	1	1	1	3	7	13	3	3	0	28	–	–	–	–	–	–	–	–	–	–	–
		26	5	3	4	12	23	38	7	7	0	28	1	0	0	0	0	0	0	0	0	0	0
Career total:		27	5	3	4	12	23	38	7	7	0	28											

GP–Games played; G–Goals; 2PG–2-point goals; A–Assists; Pts–Points; Sh–Shots; GB–Ground balls; Pen–Penalties; PIM–Penalty minutes; FOW–Faceoffs won; FOA–Faceoffs attempted
