= Dane Dobbie =

Canadian lacrosse player

Personal information
- Born: December 1, 1986 (age 39) Elora, Ontario, Canada
- Height: 5 ft 8 in (173 cm)
- Weight: 180 lb (82 kg; 12 st 12 lb)

Sport
- Position: Forward
- Shoots: Left
- NLL draft: 4th overall, 2007; Calgary Roughnecks
- NLL teams: Calgary Roughnecks; San Diego Seals
- WLA team: Langley Thunder; Coquitlam Adanacs
- Pro career: 2008–2025

Dane Dobbie (born December 1, 1986, in Elora, Ontario) is a former Canadian professional box lacrosse player for the Calgary Roughnecks in the National Lacrosse League.

Dobbie comes from a lacrosse family. His grandfather, Bob Dobbie, is a member of Canadian Lacrosse Hall of Fame and his father Larry also competed at a high level.

Dobbie won the National Lacrosse League MVP Award MVP in the 2019 NLL season. Dobbie announced he would retire from playing in 2025, taking a position as operations advisor for the Calgary Roughnecks.
