= Jon Harnett =

Canadian lacrosse player

Personal information
- Born: May 28, 1988 (age 37) Orangeville, Ontario, Canada
- Height: 6 ft 1 in (185 cm)
- Weight: 190 lb (86 kg; 13 st 8 lb)

Sport
- Position: Defence
- Shoots: Left
- NLL draft: 26th overall, 2008; Boston Blazers
- NLL teams: Boston Blazers; Buffalo Bandits; Calgary Roughnecks; Vancouver Stealth
- Pro career: 2009–2020

Jon Harnett (born May 28, 1988) is a Canadian former professional box lacrosse defenceman who played for the Calgary Roughnecks, Boston Blazers, Vancouver Stealth and Buffalo Bandits in the National Lacrosse League. He was drafted by the Boston Blazers in the 3rd round (26th overall) in the 2008 NLL Entry Draft. His brother Greg is also a professional lacrosse player.
