= Tyler Pace (lacrosse) =

Canadian professional indoor lacrosse player

Personal information
- Nationality: Canadian
- Born: April 5, 1995 (age 31) Coquitlam, British Columbia, Canada
- Height: 6 ft 0 in (183 cm)
- Weight: 195 lb (88 kg; 13 st 13 lb)

Sport
- Position: Forward
- Shoots: Right
- NCAA team: Denver (2017)
- NLL draft: 9th overall, 2017; Calgary Roughnecks
- NLL team: Calgary Roughnecks
- Pro career: 2018–

Tyler Pace (born April 5, 1995) is a Canadian professional box lacrosse forward playing with the Calgary Roughnecks of the National Lacrosse League (NLL).

After attending Blue Ridge School in Dyke, Virginia USA, Pace attended the University of Denver and played for the Denver Pioneers men's lacrosse team.

Pace was selected 9th overall in the 2017 NLL Entry Draft.

== Early life and career ==
Pace originally began his athletic career under the influence of his mother Sandy and Italian grandfather, picking up lacrosse at age three. He played junior lacrosse for the Coquitlam Adanacs, where he played under future Roughnecks head coach Curt Malawsky, and alongside future NLL teammates Christian Del Bianco and Eli Salama, winning a Minto Cup in 2016.

== College career ==
Pace attended the University of Denver, where he played four years of lacrosse, winning an NCAA championship in 2015 as a sophomore. In 2016, he was named a Second Team All-American by USILA and First Team All Big East. Pace would finish his collegiate career fifth on Denver's all-time list with 155 points.

== Professional career ==
Pace was selected 9th overall by the Calgary Roughnecks in the 2017 NLL Draft. After beginning his career as a defenceman due to Calgary having too many forwards, Pace would eventually work his way back to his natural position of forward.

== Off the field ==
Pace is the CEO of Pro Caliber Lacrosse, which he founded after his graduation from Denver in 2017, spurning an opportunity to play Major League Lacrosse to do so. Pro Caliber lacrosse states that it is the premiere development and travel program in British Columbia, with Pace stating that his goal is to help as many young lacrosse players reach the NCAA as he can. He is also a player representative for the NLLPA.

== Statistics ==
=== NLL ===
| Tyler Pace | | Regular season | | | | | | | | | Playoffs | | | | | | | | |
| Season | Team | GP | G | A | Pts | LB | PIM | Pts/GP | LB/GP | PIM/GP | GP | G | A | Pts | LB | PIM | Pts/GP | LB/GP | PIM/GP |
|---|---|---|---|---|---|---|---|---|---|---|---|---|---|---|---|---|---|---|---|
| 2018 | Calgary Roughnecks | 13 | 6 | 13 | 19 | 37 | 4 | 1.46 | 2.85 | 0.31 | – | – | – | – | – | – | – | – | – |
| 2019 | Calgary Roughnecks | 11 | 17 | 25 | 42 | 39 | 2 | 3.82 | 3.55 | 0.18 | 2 | 2 | 2 | 4 | 5 | 2 | 2.00 | 2.50 | 1.00 |
| 2022 | Calgary Roughnecks | 7 | 14 | 10 | 24 | 36 | 2 | 3.43 | 5.14 | 0.29 | – | – | – | – | – | – | – | – | – |
| 2022 | Calgary Roughnecks | 15 | 26 | 41 | 67 | 57 | 2 | 4.47 | 3.80 | 0.13 | 1 | 3 | 3 | 6 | 4 | 0 | 6.00 | 4.00 | 0.00 |
| 2023 | Calgary Roughnecks | 14 | 24 | 50 | 74 | 39 | 8 | 5.29 | 2.79 | 0.57 | 3 | 7 | 8 | 15 | 10 | 0 | 5.00 | 3.33 | 0.00 |
| 2024 | Calgary Roughnecks | 18 | 36 | 50 | 86 | 71 | 10 | 4.78 | 3.94 | 0.56 | – | – | – | – | – | – | – | – | – |
| 2025 | Calgary Roughnecks | 14 | 16 | 41 | 57 | 49 | 2 | 4.07 | 3.50 | 0.14 | 1 | 4 | 1 | 5 | 3 | 0 | 5.00 | 3.00 | 0.00 |
| 2026 | Calgary Roughnecks | 18 | 31 | 72 | 103 | 46 | 2 | 5.72 | 2.56 | 0.11 | – | – | – | – | – | – | – | – | – |
| | | 110 | 170 | 302 | 472 | 374 | 32 | 4.29 | 3.40 | 0.29 | 7 | 16 | 14 | 30 | 22 | 2 | 4.29 | 3.14 | 0.29 |
| Career Total: | | 117 | 186 | 316 | 502 | 396 | 34 | 4.29 | 3.38 | 0.29 | | | | | | | | | |

GP–Games played; G–Goals; A–Assists; Pts–Points; LB–Loose balls; PIM–Penalty minutes; Pts/GP–Points per games played; LB/GP–Loose balls per games played; PIM/GP–Penalty minutes per games played.
