= Bryce Sweeting =

Canadian lacrosse player

- Born: July 7, 1994 (age 30); Peterborough, Ontario
- Nationality: Canadian
- Height: 6 ft 2 in (1.88 m)
- Weight: 240 pounds (109 kg)
- Shoots: Left
- Position: Defense
- NLL draft: 32nd overall, 2015; Buffalo Bandits
- NLL team Former teams: Buffalo Bandits; Colorado Mammoth
- MSL team: Peterborough Lakers
- Pro career: 2016–

Bryce Sweeting (born July 7, 1994) is a Canadian professional box lacrosse player for the Buffalo Bandits of the National Lacrosse League and the Peterborough Lakers of Major Series Lacrosse. Hailing from Peterborough, Ontario, Sweeting began playing lacrosse when he was six years old. He is a graduate of St. Peter Catholic Secondary School and St. Clair College.

Sweeting began his junior career in 2012 with the Peterborough Lakers of the Ontario Junior C Lacrosse League. He worked his way up the Lakers system and began his MSL career in 2016. He was selected in the fourth round (32nd overall) of the 2015 NLL Draft, and began his career with the Colorado Mammoth in the 2016 season. After three seasons in Colorado, he was selected by the San Diego Seals in the 2018 NLL expansion draft, and was promptly dealt to the Buffalo Bandits in exchange for Ethan Schott and a second round pick in the 2018 entry draft.

In addition to lacrosse, Sweeting played junior hockey for the Lakefield Chiefs, Lindsay Muskies, and the Peterborough Stars.
