= Greg Harnett =

Canadian lacrosse player

Personal information
- Born: June 30, 1990 (age 35) Toronto, Ontario, Canada
- Height: 5 ft 11 in (180 cm)
- Weight: 185 lb (84 kg; 13 st 3 lb)

Sport
- Position: Defence
- Shoots: Left
- NLL draft: 11th overall, 2011; Calgary Roughnecks
- NLL team Former teams: Buffalo Bandits; Calgary Roughnecks
- Pro career: 2012–

Greg Harnett (born June 30, 1990) is a Canadian professional box lacrosse defenceman who plays for the Buffalo Bandits in the National Lacrosse League. He previously played for the Calgary Roughnecks, wearing #50. He was drafted in the 2nd round (11th overall) in the 2011 NLL Entry Draft. After playing 9 years with the Roughneck, Harnett signed a 1-year contract with the Bandits prior to the 2023 season.

Harnett's brother, Jon, is also a lacrosse player.
