= Corey Small =

Canadian lacrosse player (born 1987)

Personal information
- Born: March 23, 1987 (age 39) St. Catharines, Ontario, Canada
- Height: 5 ft 10 in (178 cm)
- Weight: 200 lb (91 kg; 14 st 4 lb)

Sport
- Position: Attack
- Shoots: Left
- NLL draft: 9th overall, 2009; Edmonton Rush
- NLL team Former teams: Philadelphia Wings; Vancouver Stealth; Edmonton Rush; Buffalo Bandits
- MLL team Former teams: Free Agent; Hamilton Nationals
- MSL team: Kitchener-Waterloo Kodiaks
- Pro career: 2009–

Corey Small (born March 23, 1987, in St. Catharines, Ontario) is a Canadian professional lacrosse player who plays for the Toronto Rock of the National Lacrosse League and formerly the Hamilton Nationals in Major League Lacrosse.

== High school career ==
Small attended Holy Cross Catholic Secondary School in St. Catharines. During his senior year at Holy Cross, he helped lead the Raiders to a provincial championship.

== Canadian Box career ==
=== Junior ===
Small played for the St. Catharines Athletics in the OLA Junior A Lacrosse League from to 2004 to 2008. In 2005, he won the Gaylord Powless Sportsmanship Award. During his 5 years for the Athletics, Small totaled up 127 goals and 278 points in just 102 games. He would also round up 40 goals and 77 points in 30 playoff games.

=== Senior ===
Small was selected 2nd overall in the 2009 Major Series Lacrosse draft by the Kitchener-Waterloo Kodiaks, just ahead of former Athletics teammate Dan Coates. Small finished his first season with the Kodiaks with 13 goals and 35 points.

== Professional career ==
=== Major League Lacrosse ===
After finishing his successful four-year tenure at the University of Albany, Small was drafted 22nd overall by the Toronto Nationals in the 2009 Major League Lacrosse Collegiate Draft.

=== National Lacrosse League ===
On September 9, 2009, Small was drafted 1st round, 9th overall in the 2009 NLL entry draft by the Edmonton Rush. After missing the 2014 season due to injury, Small returned to the Rush in 2015 but was traded to the Vancouver Stealth shortly into the season.

== Statistics ==
=== NCAA ===
Season	Team	GP	G	A	Pts	PPG
2006	UAlbany	10	20	5	25	2.00
2007	UAlbany	18	24	7	31	1.72
2008	UAlbany	13	34	11	45	3.46
2009	UAlbany	10	31	5	36	3.60
Totals		51	109	28	137	2.13

=== MLL ===
		Regular Season								Playoffs
Season	Team	GP	G	2ptG	A	Pts	PIM	GB	S	GP	G	2ptG	A	Pts	PIM	GB	S
2009	Toronto Nationals	4	1	0	2	3	0.5	2	7	0	0	0	0	0	0	0	0
MLL totals		4	1	0	2	3	0.5	2	7	0	0	0	0	0	0	0	0
