= David Brock (lacrosse) =

Canadian lacrosse player

Personal information
- Nationality: Canadian
- Born: August 13, 1986 (age 39) Burlington, Ontario, Canada
- Height: 6 ft 4 in (193 cm)
- Weight: 223 lb (101 kg; 15 st 13 lb)

Sport
- Position: Transition
- Shoots: Right
- NLL draft: 7th overall, 2010; Boston Blazers
- NLL team Former teams: Halifax Thunderbirds (2013-present); Philadelphia Wings (2011-12); Boston Blazers (2011)
- Pro career: 2011–

David "Big Daddy" Brock (born August 13, 1986) is a Canadian professional box lacrosse player for the Halifax Thunderbirds of the National Lacrosse League. He played college lacrosse at the University at Albany, and was selected seventh overall in the 2010 NLL Entry Draft by the Boston Blazers. Brock played two games with the blazers in 2011, before being released. He then signed with the Philadelphia Wings, with whom he spent two seasons, before being traded to the Bandits in 2012. Since then it has been hard to keep track of where David has played, he has packed his suitcase almost as much as Ryan Benesch.

Brock was drafted in the fifth round (36th overall) of the 2010 MLL Collegiate Draft by the Toronto Nationals, but never played for the club. He has also played for the Kitchener-Waterloo Kodiaks of Major Series Lacrosse.
