= Zach Higgins =

Canadian lacrosse player

Personal information
- Nationality: Canadian
- Born: December 30, 1990 (age 35) Courtice, Ontario, Canada
- Height: 6 ft 1 in (185 cm)
- Weight: 225 lb (102 kg; 16 st 1 lb)

Sport
- Position: Goaltender
- Shoots: Left
- NLL team: Buffalo Bandits
- MSL team Former teams: Brooklin Redmen; Minnesota Swarm; Georgia Swarm; Calgary Roughnecks; Philadelphia Wings; Ottawa Black Bears
- Pro career: 2014–

Zachary "Zach" Higgins (born December 30, 1990), nicknamed "the Tendy Bear", is a Canadian professional box lacrosse goaltender for the Buffalo Bandits of the National Lacrosse League and the Brooklin Redmen of Major Series Lacrosse. Hailing from Courtice, Ontario, Higgins began his Canadian amateur career with the Jr. B Clarington Green Gaels, where he won the league's Goaltender of the Year Award in 2007 and 2008. He moved up to the Jr. A Whitby Warriors, where he won a Minto Cup as the team's starter in 2011. He made his MSL debut with the Redmen in 2012. Higgins attended Courtice Secondary School, and went on to play lacrosse at Davenport University, where he was a two-time first team all-CCLA award winner.

Undrafted in the NLL, Higgins was signed by the Minnesota Swarm in 2012, and spent most of the 2013 season with the Durham TurfDogs, while remaining on Minnesota's practice squad. Although he was signed to the club's active roster on March 12, 2012, Higgins did not see any playing time. He was signed to a three-year contract extension after the season, made his first NLL appearance against the Philadelphia Wings on January 18, 2014, and made his first start on February 1, 2014, against the Colorado Mammoth.

Heading into the 2023 NLL season, Inside Lacrosse named Higgins the #4 best goalie in the NLL.
