= Justin Martin (lacrosse) =

Canadian lacrosse player (born 1995)

Personal information
- Nationality: Canadian
- Born: April 4, 1995 (age 31) Oakville, Ontario
- Height: 5 ft 11 in (180 cm)
- Weight: 185 lb (84 kg; 13 st 3 lb)

Sport
- Position: Defense
- Shoots: Left
- NLL draft: 13th overall, 2016; Buffalo Bandits
- NLL teams: Buffalo Bandits
- MSL team: Oakville Rock
- Pro career: 2017–2025

Career highlights
- NLL: 3x NLL Cup Champion (2023, 2024, 2025)

Justin Martin (born April 4, 1995) is a Canadian former professional box lacrosse player. He played for the Buffalo Bandits of the National Lacrosse League and the Oakville Rock of Major Series Lacrosse. Hailing from Oakville, Ontario, Martin began his junior lacrosse career in 2013 with the Junior B Oakville Buzz. In 2015, he moved up to Junior A with the Burlington Chiefs. He played collegiality at the University of Guelph, where he was named to the 2015 Canadian University Field Lacrosse Association All-Canadian team.

Martin was drafted in the second round (13th overall) by the Buffalo Bandits in the 2016 NLL Entry Draft. After his rookie season, he signed a two-year extension with the club.

On November 20, 2025, Martin announced his retirement from lacrosse, appearing in 122 regular season games for the Bandits over his eight seasons with the club. He won three NLL championships during his professional career.
