= 2023 Las Vegas Desert Dogs season =

National Lacrosse League season

2023 Las Vegas Desert Dogs
- League: NLL
- Division: TBD West
- 2023 record: 5–13
- Home record: 4–5
- Road record: 1–8
- Goals for: 179
- Goals against: 222
- General Manager: Bob Hamley
- Coach: Shawn Williams
- Captain: TBD
- Alternate captains: TBD
- Arena: Michelob Ultra Arena
- Average attendance: 5,960

The Las Vegas Desert Dogs are a lacrosse team based in Las Vegas, Nevada playing in the National Lacrosse League (NLL). The 2023 season was the inaugural season for the franchise and played their home games in the Michelob Ultra Arena. They are owned by Brooklyn Nets owner Joe Tsai, former NHL player Wayne Gretzky, former NBA player Steve Nash and pro golfer Dustin Johnson. All games were televised on MyLVTV and streamed on ESPN+.

The head coach and general manager of the Desert Dogs is Shawn Williams. They hired Ken Millin as offensive coordinator and Rob Williams as defensive coordinator.

== Final standings ==
East Conference
P	Team	GP	W	L	PCT	GB	Home	Road	GF	GA	Diff	GF/GP	GA/GP
1	Buffalo Bandits – xyz	18	14	4	.778	0.0	7–2	7–2	215	191	+24	11.94	10.61
2	Toronto Rock – x	18	13	5	.722	1.0	8–1	5–4	234	164	+70	13.00	9.11
3	Halifax Thunderbirds – x	18	10	8	.556	4.0	5–4	5–4	238	210	+28	13.22	11.67
4	Rochester Knighthawks – x	18	10	8	.556	4.0	6–3	4–5	218	214	+4	12.11	11.89
5	Philadelphia Wings	18	9	9	.500	5.0	4–5	5–4	200	211	−11	11.11	11.72
6	Georgia Swarm	18	8	10	.444	6.0	3–6	5–4	219	207	+12	12.17	11.50
7	New York Riptide	18	5	13	.278	9.0	3–6	2–7	201	243	−42	11.17	13.50
8	Albany FireWolves	18	3	15	.167	11.0	0–9	3–6	167	233	−66	9.28	12.94

West Conference
P	Team	GP	W	L	PCT	GB	Home	Road	GF	GA	Diff	GF/GP	GA/GP
1	San Diego Seals – xy	18	14	4	.778	0.0	7–2	7–2	240	193	+47	13.33	10.72
2	Calgary Roughnecks – x	18	13	5	.722	1.0	7–2	6–3	218	167	+51	12.11	9.28
3	Panther City Lacrosse Club – x	18	10	8	.556	4.0	6–3	4–5	204	193	+11	11.33	10.72
4	Colorado Mammoth – x	18	9	9	.500	5.0	7–2	2–7	190	208	−18	10.56	11.56
5	Saskatchewan Rush	18	8	10	.444	6.0	5–4	3–6	204	212	−8	11.33	11.78
6	Las Vegas Desert Dogs	18	5	13	.278	9.0	4–5	1–8	179	222	−43	9.94	12.33
7	Vancouver Warriors	18	4	14	.222	10.0	2–7	2–7	188	247	−59	10.44	13.72

=== Game log ===
Game	Date	Opponent	Location	Score	OT	Attendance	Record
1	December 9, 2022	@ Panther City Lacrosse Club	Dickies Arena	L 11–13		4,184	0–1
2	December 16, 2022	Panther City Lacrosse Club	Michelob Ultra Arena	L 3–9		7,072	0–2
3	January 6, 2023	Philadelphia Wings	Michelob Ultra Arena	L 9–14		4,809	0–3
4	January 14, 2023	@ Vancouver Warriors	Rogers Arena	L 16–19		8,483	0–4
5	January 20, 2023	Vancouver Warriors	Michelob Ultra Arena	W 15–14		5,057	1–4
6	January 28, 2023	@ Saskatchewan Rush	SaskTel Centre	L 10–15		9,335	1–5
7	February 4, 2023	Colorado Mammoth	Michelob Ultra Arena	W 13–8		6,053	2–5
8	February 18, 2023	@ Albany FireWolves	MVP Arena	W 12–10		3,520	3–5
9	February 24, 2023	Calgary Roughnecks	Michelob Ultra Arena	W 11–9		4,814	4–5
10	March 4, 2023	@ San Diego Seals	Snapdragon Stadium	L 12–15		8,443	4–6
11	March 11, 2023	Vancouver Warriors	Michelob Ultra Arena	L 5–14		7,914	4–7
12	March 18, 2023	@ Panther City Lacrosse Club	Dickies Arena	L 8–11		2,238	4–8
13	March 25, 2023	Rochester Knighthawks	Michelob Ultra Arena	W 12–7		5,430	5–8
14	March 31, 2023	@ Colorado Mammoth	Ball Arena	L 9–11		9,798	5–9
15	April 8, 2023	San Diego Seals	Michelob Ultra Arena	L 10–14		5,540	5–10
16	April 14, 2023	@ Calgary Roughnecks	Scotiabank Saddledome	L 7–12		12,998	5–11
17	April 22, 2023	@ San Diego Seals	Pechanga Arena	L 4–14		4,092	5–12
18	April 29, 2023	Saskatchewan Rush	Michelob Ultra Arena	L 12–13		6,947	5–13

== Roster ==
=== Expansion Draft ===
The expansion draft for the Las Vegas Desert Dogs was held on July 7, 2022. The Desert Dogs selected:

Round	Player	Former team
1	Jackson Nishimura	Albany FireWolves
2	Connor Fields	Buffalo Bandits
3	Riley Hutchcraft	Toronto Rock
4	John Wagner	Rochester Knighthawks
5	Landon Kells	Calgary Roughnecks
6	Brett McIntyre	Colorado Mammoth
7	Connor Kirst	Georgia Swarm
8	James Barclay	Halifax Thunderbirds
9	Ty Thompson	New York Riptide
10	Jack Hannah	Panther City LC
11	Jackson Suboch	Philadelphia Wings
12	Frank Scigliano	San Diego Seals
13	Jeff Cornwall	Saskatchewan Rush
14	Tyson Roe	Vancouver Warriors

The following trades were made immediately following the draft:

- Las Vegas traded Riley Hutchcraft, Connor Fields and their 1st round Draft Pick (1st overall) in the 2022 Entry Draft to Rochester for Charlie Bertrand and their 1st-round pick (2nd overall), 4th-round pick (74th overall), 6th-round pick (91st overall) in the 2022 Entry Draft and their 1st round selection in the 2023 Entry Draft
- Las Vegas traded Brett McIntyre back to Colorado for Sam Firth and Erik Turner
- Las Vegas traded Frank Scigliano back to San Diego for Mark Glicini, Brandon Clelland, their 2nd-round pick (26th overall) in the 2022 Entry Draft and their 3rd-round pick in the 2023 Entry Draft
- Las Vegas traded Jeff Cornwall to Calgary for Marshal King and their 1st-round pick (18th overall) in the 2022 Entry Draft

=== Entry Draft ===
The 2022 NLL Entry Draft took place on September 10, 2022. The Las Vegas Desert Dogs selected:

Round	Overall	Player	Position	College/Club
1	2	Dylan Watson	F	Orangeville Northmen – Jacksonville University
1	16	Jake Saunders	D	Brooklin Lacrosse Club – University of Richmond
2	24	Griffin Hall	D	Victoria Shamrocks
2	26	Sean Westley	F	Brooklin Lacrosse Club – St. Bonaventure University
3	44	Zach Cole	D	St. Joseph's University
4	59	Colin Jeffrey	G	Victoria Shamrocks – University of Montevallo
4	74	Chris Merle	D	Stony Brook University
5	75	Peytin Wallace	D	Whitby Jr A
6	90	Tyler Ewen	F	Burnaby – Queens University of Charlotte
6	91	Stryker Roloff	D	Langley Jr A
