= 2023 San Diego Seals season =

National Lacrosse League season

2023 San Diego Seals
- League: NLL
- Division: West
- 2023 record: 14-4
- Home record: 7-2
- Road record: 7-2
- Goals for: 240
- Goals against: 193
- General Manager: Patrick Merrill
- Coach: Patrick Merrill
- Captain: Brodie Merrill
- Alternate captains: Cam Holding; Wesley Berg
- Arena: Pechanga Arena
- Average attendance: 5,115

The San Diego Seals are a lacrosse team based in San Diego, California. The team plays in the National Lacrosse League (NLL). The 2023 season was their fourth season in the NLL. The season started on December 3, 2022, and their home opener was on December 9, 2022, against the Saskatchewan Rush. That game was First Responder Appreciation Night.

The 2023 NLL Stadium Showdown, the first outdoor NLL game, was held on March 4 at Snapdragon Stadium, between the Las Vegas Desert Dogs and the San Diego Seals.

On September 13, 2023, team captain Brodie Merrill announced his retirement from professional lacrosse. His number (#17) was retired at the beginning of the 2024 Seals season.

== Regular season ==
=== Standings ===
East Conference
P	Team	GP	W	L	PCT	GB	Home	Road	GF	GA	Diff	GF/GP	GA/GP
1	Buffalo Bandits – xyz	18	14	4	.778	0.0	7–2	7–2	215	191	+24	11.94	10.61
2	Toronto Rock – x	18	13	5	.722	1.0	8–1	5–4	234	164	+70	13.00	9.11
3	Halifax Thunderbirds – x	18	10	8	.556	4.0	5–4	5–4	238	210	+28	13.22	11.67
4	Rochester Knighthawks – x	18	10	8	.556	4.0	6–3	4–5	218	214	+4	12.11	11.89
5	Philadelphia Wings	18	9	9	.500	5.0	4–5	5–4	200	211	−11	11.11	11.72
6	Georgia Swarm	18	8	10	.444	6.0	3–6	5–4	219	207	+12	12.17	11.50
7	New York Riptide	18	5	13	.278	9.0	3–6	2–7	201	243	−42	11.17	13.50
8	Albany FireWolves	18	3	15	.167	11.0	0–9	3–6	167	233	−66	9.28	12.94

West Conference
P	Team	GP	W	L	PCT	GB	Home	Road	GF	GA	Diff	GF/GP	GA/GP
1	San Diego Seals – xy	18	14	4	.778	0.0	7–2	7–2	240	193	+47	13.33	10.72
2	Calgary Roughnecks – x	18	13	5	.722	1.0	7–2	6–3	218	167	+51	12.11	9.28
3	Panther City Lacrosse Club – x	18	10	8	.556	4.0	6–3	4–5	204	193	+11	11.33	10.72
4	Colorado Mammoth – x	18	9	9	.500	5.0	7–2	2–7	190	208	−18	10.56	11.56
5	Saskatchewan Rush	18	8	10	.444	6.0	5–4	3–6	204	212	−8	11.33	11.78
6	Las Vegas Desert Dogs	18	5	13	.278	9.0	4–5	1–8	179	222	−43	9.94	12.33
7	Vancouver Warriors	18	4	14	.222	10.0	2–7	2–7	188	247	−59	10.44	13.72

== Game log ==
=== Regular season ===
Game	Date	Opponent	Location	Score	OT	Attendance	Record
1	December 3, 2022	@ New York Riptide	Nassau Live Center	W 15–14		5,028	1–0
2	December 9, 2022	Saskatchewan Rush	Pechanga Arena	W 13–12	OT	7,471	2–0
3	December 30, 2022	@ Calgary Roughnecks	Scotiabank Saddledome	W 17–14		10,559	3–0
4	January 7, 2023	Vancouver Warriors	Pechanga Arena	W 16–11		6,283	4–0
5	January 14, 2023	@ Calgary Roughnecks	Scotiabank Saddledome	L 10–14		10,113	4–1
6	January 28, 2023	@ Colorado Mammoth	Ball Arena	W 13–9		10,021	5–1
7	February 4, 2023	Panther City Lacrosse Club	Pechanga Arena	W 12–10		4,214	6–1
8	February 17, 2023	Saskatchewan Rush	Pechanga Arena	L 11–16		4,144	6–2
9	March 4, 2023	Las Vegas Desert Dogs	Pechanga Arena	W 15–12		8,443	7–2
10	March 11, 2023	@ Saskatchewan Rush	SaskTel Centre	W 12–11		7,425	8–2
11	March 17, 2023	@ Vancouver Warriors	Rogers Arena	W 16–9		8,583	9–2
12	March 24, 2023	@ Panther City Lacrosse Club	Dickies Arena	W 17–9		2,238	10–2
13	March 25, 2023	Buffalo Bandits	Pechanga Arena	L 6–7	OT	4,388	10–3
14	March 31, 2023	Calgary Roughnecks	Pechanga Arena	W 14–8		3,114	11–3
15	April 8, 2023	@ Las Vegas Desert Dogs	Michelob Ultra Arena	W 14–10		5,540	12–3
16	April 14, 2023	@ Colorado Mammoth	Ball Arena	L 14–15		10,443	12–4
17	April 22, 2023	Las Vegas Desert Dogs	Pechanga Arena	W 14–4		4,092	13–4
18	April 29, 2023	Colorado Mammoth	Pechanga Arena	W 11–8		3,883	14–4

The ninth game of the season was a home game played at Snapdragon Stadium in San Diego.

=== Playoffs ===
Game	Date	Opponent	Location	Score	OT	Attendance	Record
Western division semi-final	May 5, 2023	Colorado Mammoth	Pechanga Arena San Diego	L 12–13		5,210	0–1

== Roster ==
San Diego Seals roster
Active (21-man) roster		Inactive roster	Coaches
Goaltenders: 31 (Canada) Chris Origlieri; 92 (England) Frank Scigliano; Defensemen: 2 (Canada) Drew Belgrave; 44 (Canada) Graydon Bradley; 25 (United States) Eli Gobrecht; 19 (Canada) Cam Holding (A); 52 (Canada) Kellen LeClair; 91 (United States) Danny Logan; 17 (Canada) Brodie Merrill (C); 26 (Canada) Patrick Shoemay; 12 (Canada) Matt Sykes	Forwards: 14 (Canada) Wesley Berg (A); 10 (Canada) Kevin Crowley; 71 (Canada) Curtis Dickson; 44 (Canada) Dane Dobbie; 88 (United States) Jake Govett; 3 (United States) Mac O'Keefe; 83 (Iroquois) Austin Staats; Transition: 9 (Canada) Jesse Gamble; 33 (Canada) Tre Leclaire; 96 (Canada) Mike McCannell	Practice squad: 41 (United States) Connor Farrell; 11 (Canada) Cameron Lumb; 16 (Canada) Adam Noakes; 43 (Canada) Tyler Sceviour; Injured reserve: 22 (Canada) Oliver Bolsterli; 13 (Canada) Jacob Dunbar; 21 (Canada) Casey Jackson; Holdout: 15 (Canada) Mathieu Boissonneault; 23 (Iroquois) Tyson Bomberry; -- (Canada) Owen Russell	Head coach: Patrick Merrill; Assistant coaches: Josh Sanderson; Legend: * Suspended list; (C) Captain; (A) Alternate captain; Roster updated 2023-05-05; NLL Transactions

=== Entry Draft ===
The 2022 NLL Entry Draft took place on September 10, 2022. The Seals made the following selections:

Round	Overall	Player	Position	College/Club
1	22	Jake Govett	F	San Diego Royals – University of Delaware
2	31	Cameron Lumb	D	Victoria Shamrocks
2	34	Payton Rezenka	D	San Diego Royals – Loyola University
2	39	Adam Noakes	F	Coquitlam Jr A
4	69	Chris Dong	T	Oakville Buzz Jr A – Western University
6	100	Mike Sisselberger	T	Lehigh University
