= 2023 Philadelphia Wings season =

National Lacrosse League season

2023 Philadelphia Wings
- League: NLL
- Division: East
- 2023 record: 9–9
- Home record: 4–5
- Road record: 5–4
- Goals for: 200
- Goals against: 211
- General Manager: Paul Day
- Coach: Paul Day
- Arena: Wells Fargo Center
- Average attendance: 8,530

The Philadelphia Wings are a lacrosse team based in Philadelphia, Pennsylvania playing in the National Lacrosse League (NLL). The 2023 season is their 4th season in the NLL.

== Regular season ==
=== Final standings ===
East Conference
P	Team	GP	W	L	PCT	GB	Home	Road	GF	GA	Diff	GF/GP	GA/GP
1	Buffalo Bandits – xyz	18	14	4	.778	0.0	7–2	7–2	215	191	+24	11.94	10.61
2	Toronto Rock – x	18	13	5	.722	1.0	8–1	5–4	234	164	+70	13.00	9.11
3	Halifax Thunderbirds – x	18	10	8	.556	4.0	5–4	5–4	238	210	+28	13.22	11.67
4	Rochester Knighthawks – x	18	10	8	.556	4.0	6–3	4–5	218	214	+4	12.11	11.89
5	Philadelphia Wings	18	9	9	.500	5.0	4–5	5–4	200	211	−11	11.11	11.72
6	Georgia Swarm	18	8	10	.444	6.0	3–6	5–4	219	207	+12	12.17	11.50
7	New York Riptide	18	5	13	.278	9.0	3–6	2–7	201	243	−42	11.17	13.50
8	Albany FireWolves	18	3	15	.167	11.0	0–9	3–6	167	233	−66	9.28	12.94

West Conference
P	Team	GP	W	L	PCT	GB	Home	Road	GF	GA	Diff	GF/GP	GA/GP
1	San Diego Seals – xy	18	14	4	.778	0.0	7–2	7–2	240	193	+47	13.33	10.72
2	Calgary Roughnecks – x	18	13	5	.722	1.0	7–2	6–3	218	167	+51	12.11	9.28
3	Panther City Lacrosse Club – x	18	10	8	.556	4.0	6–3	4–5	204	193	+11	11.33	10.72
4	Colorado Mammoth – x	18	9	9	.500	5.0	7–2	2–7	190	208	−18	10.56	11.56
5	Saskatchewan Rush	18	8	10	.444	6.0	5–4	3–6	204	212	−8	11.33	11.78
6	Las Vegas Desert Dogs	18	5	13	.278	9.0	4–5	1–8	179	222	−43	9.94	12.33
7	Vancouver Warriors	18	4	14	.222	10.0	2–7	2–7	188	247	−59	10.44	13.72

== Game log ==
Game	Date	Opponent	Location	Score	OT	Attendance	Record
1	December 2, 2022	@ Halifax Thunderbirds	Scotiabank Centre	L 8–18		7,778	0–1
2	December 17, 2022	@ Georgia Swarm	Gas South Arena	W 13–12		8,085	1–1
3	January 6, 2023	@ Las Vegas Desert Dogs	Michelob Ultra Arena	W 14–9		4,809	2–1
4	January 14, 2023	Panther City Lacrosse Club	Wells Fargo Center	L 10–12		10,234	2–2
5	January 21, 2023	Toronto Rock	Wells Fargo Center	L 5–14		7,330	2–3
6	January 27, 2023	Buffalo Bandits	Wells Fargo Center	L 9–13		7,768	2–4
7	February 4, 2023	Albany FireWolves	Wells Fargo Center	W 13–5		8,333	3–4
8	February 18, 2023	@ Buffalo Bandits	KeyBank Center	L 12–13	OT	14,632	3–5
9	March 4, 2023	New York Riptide	Wells Fargo Center	W 19–12		9,329	4–5
10	March 6, 2023	Toronto Rock	Wells Fargo Center	W 11–10		6,180	5–5
11	March 11, 2023	@ New York Riptide	Nassau Coliseum	L 10–13		5,102	5–6
12	March 18, 2023	Georgia Swarm	Wells Fargo Center	L 12–13		7,840	5–7
13	March 19, 2023	@ Rochester Knighthawks	Blue Cross Arena	W 9–8	OT	4,855	6–7
14	March 25, 2023	Halifax Thunderbirds	Wells Fargo Center	L 10–14		9,819	6–8
15	April 2, 2023	Rochester Knighthawks	Wells Fargo Center	W 14–13	OT	9,935	7–8
16	April 15, 2023	@ Toronto Rock	FirstOntario Centre	L 7–12		10,320	7–9
17	April 23, 2023	@ Albany FireWolves	MVP Arena	W 10–9	OT	3,107	8–9
18	April 29, 2023	@ Rochester Knighthawks	Blue Cross Arena	W 14–11		5,811	9–9

== Roster ==
Philadelphia Wings roster
Active (21-man) roster		Inactive roster	Coaches
Goaltenders: 55 (Canada) Angus Goodleaf; 31 (Canada) Zach Higgins; Defensemen: 18 (Canada) Steph Charbonneau; 7 (Canada) Alex Crepinsek; 26 (United States) Isaiah Davis-Allen; 29 (Canada) Ian Llord; 41 (Canada) Alex Pace; 44 (United States) John Ranagan; 2 (Canada) Eric Shewell; 12 (Canada) Chad Tutton; 94 (Canada) Ryan Wagner	Forwards: 92 (Canada) Sam LeClair; 6 (United States) Hunter Lemieux; 90 (Canada) Ben McIntosh; 1 (United States) Matt Rambo; 15 (United States) Joe Resetarits; 10 (United States) Blaze Riorden; 23 (Canada) Cory Vitarelli; Transition: 9 (United States) Trevor Baptiste; 73 (Haudenosaunee) Blake Gibson-McDonald; 46 (Canada) Kiel Matisz (C)	Practice squad: Bryan Costabile; 96 George Downey; 30 (Canada) Deacan Knott; 50 (United States) Christian Scarpello; Injured reserve: 3 (Canada) Brock Sorenson; Holdout: (United States) Patrick Resch; 8 (United States) Koby Smith; Protected list: 47 (Canada) Kyle Jackson	Head coach {{{Head Coach}}} Legend: * Suspended list; (C) Captain; (A) Alternate captain; Roster updated 2019-02-20; NLL Transactions

=== Entry draft ===
The 2022 NLL Entry Draft took place on September 10, 2022. The Wings made the following selections:

Round	Overall	Player	College/Club
1	23	Taggart Clark	Toronto Beaches – Robert Morris University
2	33	Matt Anderson	Burlington Jr A – Stoney Brook University
2	38	Deacon Knott	Peterborough Jr A
3	57	Troy Hettinger	Jacksonville University
4	66	Jack Myers	Ohio State University
6	103	Max Waldbaum	3d Lacrosse – Jacksonville University*
