= 2023 Colorado Mammoth season =

National Lacrosse League season

2023 Colorado Mammoth
- League: NLL
- Division: West
- 2023 record: 9-9
- Home record: 7-2
- Road record: 2-7
- Goals for: 190
- Goals against: 208
- General Manager: Brad Self
- Coach: Pat Coyle
- Captain: Dan Coates
- Alternate captains: Joey Cupido; Robert Hope
- Arena: Ball Arena
- Average attendance: 9,972

The Colorado Mammoth are a lacrosse team based in Denver, Colorado playing in the National Lacrosse League (NLL). The 2023 season is the 36th in franchise history and 20th as the Mammoth (previously the Washington Power, Pittsburgh Crossefire, and Baltimore Thunder). They lost the 2023 NLL Finals to the Buffalo Bandits in 3 games.

== Final standings ==
East Conference
P	Team	GP	W	L	PCT	GB	Home	Road	GF	GA	Diff	GF/GP	GA/GP
1	Buffalo Bandits – xyz	18	14	4	.778	0.0	7–2	7–2	215	191	+24	11.94	10.61
2	Toronto Rock – x	18	13	5	.722	1.0	8–1	5–4	234	164	+70	13.00	9.11
3	Halifax Thunderbirds – x	18	10	8	.556	4.0	5–4	5–4	238	210	+28	13.22	11.67
4	Rochester Knighthawks – x	18	10	8	.556	4.0	6–3	4–5	218	214	+4	12.11	11.89
5	Philadelphia Wings	18	9	9	.500	5.0	4–5	5–4	200	211	−11	11.11	11.72
6	Georgia Swarm	18	8	10	.444	6.0	3–6	5–4	219	207	+12	12.17	11.50
7	New York Riptide	18	5	13	.278	9.0	3–6	2–7	201	243	−42	11.17	13.50
8	Albany FireWolves	18	3	15	.167	11.0	0–9	3–6	167	233	−66	9.28	12.94

West Conference
P	Team	GP	W	L	PCT	GB	Home	Road	GF	GA	Diff	GF/GP	GA/GP
1	San Diego Seals – xy	18	14	4	.778	0.0	7–2	7–2	240	193	+47	13.33	10.72
2	Calgary Roughnecks – x	18	13	5	.722	1.0	7–2	6–3	218	167	+51	12.11	9.28
3	Panther City Lacrosse Club – x	18	10	8	.556	4.0	6–3	4–5	204	193	+11	11.33	10.72
4	Colorado Mammoth – x	18	9	9	.500	5.0	7–2	2–7	190	208	−18	10.56	11.56
5	Saskatchewan Rush	18	8	10	.444	6.0	5–4	3–6	204	212	−8	11.33	11.78
6	Las Vegas Desert Dogs	18	5	13	.278	9.0	4–5	1–8	179	222	−43	9.94	12.33
7	Vancouver Warriors	18	4	14	.222	10.0	2–7	2–7	188	247	−59	10.44	13.72

=== Regular season ===
Game	Date	Opponent	Location	Score	OT	Attendance	Record
1	December 3, 2022	@ Saskatchewan Rush	SaskTel Centre	L 6–18		7,736	0–1
2	December 17, 2022	@ Panther City Lacrosse Club	Dickies Arena	W 12–9		1,842	1–1
3	January 7, 2023	Calgary Roughnecks	Ball Arena	W 9–8		11,239	2–1
4	January 13, 2023	Saskatchewan Rush	Ball Arena	W 11–10	OT	8,952	3–1
5	January 28, 2023	San Diego Seals	Ball Arena	L 9–13		10,021	3–2
6	February 3, 2023	Georgia Swarm	Ball Arena	W 13–10		9,271	4–2
7	February 4, 2023	@ Las Vegas Desert Dogs	Michelob Ultra Arena	L 8–13		6,053	4–3
8	February 11, 2023	@ Calgary Roughnecks	Scotiabank Saddledome	L 9–13		11,819	4–4
9	February 18, 2023	@ Panther City Lacrosse Club	Dickies Arena	L 7–13		2,421	4–5
10	February 24, 2023	Panther City Lacrosse Club	Ball Arena	W 14–12		9,973	5–5
11	March 10, 2023	Calgary Roughnecks	Ball Arena	L 10–16		9,632	5–6
12	March 18, 2023	@ Buffalo Bandits	KeyBank Center	W 13–10		15,496	6–6
13	March 25, 2023	@ Vancouver Warriors	Rogers Arena	L 12–14		7,837	6–7
14	March 31, 2023	Las Vegas Desert Dogs	Ball Arena	W 11–9		9,798	7–7
15	April 8, 2023	Vancouver Warriors	Ball Arena	W 12–5		10,419	8–7
16	April 14, 2023	San Diego Seals	Ball Arena	W 15–14		10,443	9–7
17	April 22, 2023	@ Saskatchewan Rush	SaskTel Centre	L 11–12	OT	10,781	9–8
18	April 29, 2023	@ San Diego Seals	Pechanga Arena	L 8–11		3,883	9–9

=== Playoffs ===
Game	Date	Opponent	Location	Score	OT	Attendance	Record
Western Conference Quarterfinals	May 5, 2023	@ San Diego Seals	Pechanga Arena	W 13–12		5,210	1–0
Western Conference finals (game 1)	May 11, 2023	Calgary Roughnecks	Ball Arena	W 8–7		8,183	2–0
Western Conference finals (game 2)	May 13, 2023	@ Calgary Roughnecks	Scotiabank Saddledome	L 12–13		7,681	2–1
Western Conference finals (game 3)	May 20, 2023	Calgary Roughnecks	Ball Arena	W 9–7		8,251	3–1
NLL Finals (game 1)	May 27, 2023	@ Buffalo Bandits	KeyBank Center	L 12–13		14,260	3–2
NLL Finals (game 2)	May 29, 2023	Buffalo Bandits	Ball Arena	W 16–10		10,686	4–2
NLL finals (game 3)	June 3, 2023	@ Buffalo Bandits	KeyBank Center	L 4–13		18,296	4–3

== Roster ==
=== Entry Draft ===
The 2022 NLL Entry Draft took place on September 10, 2022. The Colorado Mammoth selected:

Round	Overall	Player	Position	College/Club
1	15	Owen Down	D	Robert Morris University / Coburg Kodiaks
3	51	Nick Musso	D	Coquitlam Adanacs
5	89	Zach Geddes	D	Georgetown
6	104	Evan Dinn	D	University of Virginia
