= 2023 Albany FireWolves season =

2023 Albany FireWolves
- League: NLL
- Division: East
- 2023 record: 3-15
- Home record: 0-9
- Road record: 3-6
- Goals for: 167
- Goals against: 233
- General Manager: Chris Seinko
- Coach: Glenn Clark
- Arena: MVP Arena
- Average attendance: 3,610

The Albany FireWolves are a lacrosse team based in Albany, New York playing in the National Lacrosse League (NLL). The 2023 season is the franchise's 7th season in the league, 2nd as the Albany FireWolves.

A month before the season started, the team announced that George Manias resigned as team president. Chris Porreca, who was previously Vice President of Corporate Sales & Business Operations has taken over the position of president.

== Regular season ==
=== Current standings ===
East Conference
P	Team	GP	W	L	PCT	GB	Home	Road	GF	GA	Diff	GF/GP	GA/GP
1	Buffalo Bandits – xyz	18	14	4	.778	0.0	7–2	7–2	215	191	+24	11.94	10.61
2	Toronto Rock – x	18	13	5	.722	1.0	8–1	5–4	234	164	+70	13.00	9.11
3	Halifax Thunderbirds – x	18	10	8	.556	4.0	5–4	5–4	238	210	+28	13.22	11.67
4	Rochester Knighthawks – x	18	10	8	.556	4.0	6–3	4–5	218	214	+4	12.11	11.89
5	Philadelphia Wings	18	9	9	.500	5.0	4–5	5–4	200	211	−11	11.11	11.72
6	Georgia Swarm	18	8	10	.444	6.0	3–6	5–4	219	207	+12	12.17	11.50
7	New York Riptide	18	5	13	.278	9.0	3–6	2–7	201	243	−42	11.17	13.50
8	Albany FireWolves	18	3	15	.167	11.0	0–9	3–6	167	233	−66	9.28	12.94

West Conference
P	Team	GP	W	L	PCT	GB	Home	Road	GF	GA	Diff	GF/GP	GA/GP
1	San Diego Seals – xy	18	14	4	.778	0.0	7–2	7–2	240	193	+47	13.33	10.72
2	Calgary Roughnecks – x	18	13	5	.722	1.0	7–2	6–3	218	167	+51	12.11	9.28
3	Panther City Lacrosse Club – x	18	10	8	.556	4.0	6–3	4–5	204	193	+11	11.33	10.72
4	Colorado Mammoth – x	18	9	9	.500	5.0	7–2	2–7	190	208	−18	10.56	11.56
5	Saskatchewan Rush	18	8	10	.444	6.0	5–4	3–6	204	212	−8	11.33	11.78
6	Las Vegas Desert Dogs	18	5	13	.278	9.0	4–5	1–8	179	222	−43	9.94	12.33
7	Vancouver Warriors	18	4	14	.222	10.0	2–7	2–7	188	247	−59	10.44	13.72

== Game log ==
Game	Date	Opponent	Location	Score	OT	Attendance	Record
1	December 3, 2022	@ Buffalo Bandits	KeyBank Center	W 11–10		11,493	1–0
2	December 17, 2022	Rochester Knighthawks	MVP Arena	L 13–14		3,819	1–1
3	January 7, 2023	Halifax Thunderbirds	MVP Arena	L 11–14		3,843	1–2
4	January 13, 2023	@ Halifax Thunderbirds	Scotiabank Centre	W 11–10	OT	9,211	2–2
5	January 21, 2023	New York Riptide	MVP Arena	L 10–16		3,642	2–3
6	February 4, 2023	@ Philadelphia Wings	Wells Fargo Center (Philadelphia)	L 5–13		8,333	2–4
7	February 11, 2023	@ New York Riptide	Nassau Coliseum	L 12–14		4,738	2–5
8	February 18, 2023	Las Vegas Desert Dogs	MVP Arena	L 10–12		3,520	2–6
9	February 25, 2023	@ Georgia Swarm	Gas South Arena	L 4–20		8,715	2–7
10	March 4, 2023	Georgia Swarm	MVP Arena	L 8–9	OT	3,492	2–8
11	March 11, 2023	@ Toronto Rock	FirstOntario Centre	L 9–12		8,421	2–9
12	March 18, 2023	@ New York Riptide	Nassau Coliseum	L 10–13		4,512	2–10
13	March 25, 2023	Toronto Rock	MVP Arena	L 9–11		3,849	2–11
14	April 1, 2023	@ Panther City Lacrosse Club	Dickies Arena	L 8–12		2,329	2–12
15	April 8, 2023	@ Rochester Knighthawks	Blue Cross Arena	W 14–12		4,628	3–12
16	April 15, 2023	Georgia Swarm	MVP Arena	L 6–15		3,661	3–13
17	April 23, 2023	Philadelphia Wings	MVP Arena	L 9–10		3,107	3–14
18	April 29, 2023	Buffalo Bandits	MVP Arena	L 10–16		3,558	3–15

== Roster ==
Albany FireWolves roster
Active (21-man) roster		Inactive roster	Coaches
Goaltenders: 1 (Canada) Jackson Brown; 76 (Canada) Justin Geddie; Defensemen: 27 (Canada) Mike Byrne; 88 (Canada) Curtis Conley; 77 (Canada) Nick Chaykowsky; 8 (United States) Greg Downing; 73 (Canada) Aaron Forster; 19 (Canada) Patrick Kaschalk; 18 (Haudenosaunee) Ty Logan; 13 (United States) Brett Manney (C); 21 (Canada) Brent Mitchell; 11 (Canada) Jackson Nishimura	Forwards: 6 (United States) Charlie Kitchen; 66 (United States) Kieran McArdle; 41 (United States) John Piatelli; 16 (Canada) Justin Scott; 22 (Haudenosaunee) Hiana Thompson; 44 (Canada) Tanner Thomson; 57 (Canada) Ethan Walker; 17 (Canada) Colton Watkinson; Transition: 33 (Canada) John LaFontaine (A)		Head coach: Glenn Clark; Assistant coaches: Darryl Gibson; Clem O'Drasio; Legend: * Suspended list; (C) Captain; (A) Alternate captain; Roster updated 2022-01-12; NLL Transactions

=== Entry Draft ===
The 2022 NLL Entry Draft took place on September 10, 2022. The FireWolves made the following selections:

Round	Overall	Player	College/Club
1	4	Alex Simmons	St Catharines – University of Denver/Syracuse University
1	7	Will Johansen	Nanaimo Timbermen – Robert Morris University
1	17	Tye Kurtz	Cobourg Kodiaks – University of Delaware
3	53	John Piatelli	Cornell University
4	67	Matt Duncan	Toronto Beaches – Robert Morris University
6	98	Aiden Guld	Coquitlam Jr A – University of Toronto****
