= 2023 Rochester Knighthawks season =

Lacrosse team season

2023 Rochester Knighthawks
- League: NLL
- Division: 4th East
- 2023 record: 10-8
- Home record: 6-3
- Road record: 4-5
- Goals for: 218
- Goals against: 214
- General Manager: Dan Carey
- Coach: Mike Hasen
- Captain: Paul Dawson
- Alternate captains: Curtis Knight
- Arena: Blue Cross Arena
- Average attendance: 5,114

Team leaders
- Goals: Connor Fields
- Assists: Curtis Knight
- Points: Connor Fields
- Penalties in minutes: Matt Bennett
- Loose Balls: Matt Gilray
- Wins: Rylan Hartley
- Goals against average: Rylan Hartley

The Rochester Knighthawks are a lacrosse team based in Rochester, New York playing in the National Lacrosse League (NLL). The 2023 season will be the team's 3rd season in the league. The original Knighthawks moved to Halifax for the 2019/2020 season to become the Halifax Thunderbirds.

== Regular season ==
=== Current standings ===
East Conference
P	Team	GP	W	L	PCT	GB	Home	Road	GF	GA	Diff	GF/GP	GA/GP
1	Buffalo Bandits – xyz	18	14	4	.778	0.0	7–2	7–2	215	191	+24	11.94	10.61
2	Toronto Rock – x	18	13	5	.722	1.0	8–1	5–4	234	164	+70	13.00	9.11
3	Halifax Thunderbirds – x	18	10	8	.556	4.0	5–4	5–4	238	210	+28	13.22	11.67
4	Rochester Knighthawks – x	18	10	8	.556	4.0	6–3	4–5	218	214	+4	12.11	11.89
5	Philadelphia Wings	18	9	9	.500	5.0	4–5	5–4	200	211	−11	11.11	11.72
6	Georgia Swarm	18	8	10	.444	6.0	3–6	5–4	219	207	+12	12.17	11.50
7	New York Riptide	18	5	13	.278	9.0	3–6	2–7	201	243	−42	11.17	13.50
8	Albany FireWolves	18	3	15	.167	11.0	0–9	3–6	167	233	−66	9.28	12.94

West Conference
P	Team	GP	W	L	PCT	GB	Home	Road	GF	GA	Diff	GF/GP	GA/GP
1	San Diego Seals – xy	18	14	4	.778	0.0	7–2	7–2	240	193	+47	13.33	10.72
2	Calgary Roughnecks – x	18	13	5	.722	1.0	7–2	6–3	218	167	+51	12.11	9.28
3	Panther City Lacrosse Club – x	18	10	8	.556	4.0	6–3	4–5	204	193	+11	11.33	10.72
4	Colorado Mammoth – x	18	9	9	.500	5.0	7–2	2–7	190	208	−18	10.56	11.56
5	Saskatchewan Rush	18	8	10	.444	6.0	5–4	3–6	204	212	−8	11.33	11.78
6	Las Vegas Desert Dogs	18	5	13	.278	9.0	4–5	1–8	179	222	−43	9.94	12.33
7	Vancouver Warriors	18	4	14	.222	10.0	2–7	2–7	188	247	−59	10.44	13.72

== Game log ==
Game	Date	Opponent	Location	Score	OT	Attendance	Record
1	December 3, 2022	@ Georgia Swarm	Gas South Arena	W 16–11		6,821	1–0
2	December 10, 2022	Toronto Rock	Blue Cross Arena	W 11–7		4,157	2–0
3	December 17, 2022	@ Albany FireWolves	Times Union Center	W 14–13		3,819	3–0
4	January 7, 2023	Panther City Lacrosse Club	Blue Cross Arena	W 17–9		4,062	4–0
5	January 15, 2023	@ New York Riptide	Nassau Coliseum	W 11–8		3,190	5–0
6	January 20, 2023	Buffalo Bandits	Blue Cross Arena	W 15–12		6,948	6–0
7	January 27, 2023	@ Halifax Thunderbirds	Scotiabank Centre	L 7–17		7,985	6–1
8	February 4, 2023	@ Buffalo Bandits	KeyBank Center	L 10–13		14,923	6–2
9	February 11, 2023	Halifax Thunderbirds	Blue Cross Arena	W 16–14		5,219	7–2
10	February 25, 2023	New York Riptide	Blue Cross Arena	W 11–10	OT	4,767	8–2
11	March 4, 2023	@ Toronto Rock	FirstOntario Centre	L 8–9		10,229	8–3
12	March 12, 2023	@ Georgia Swarm	Gas South Arena	W 19–18		9,064	9–3
13	March 19, 2023	Philadelphia Wings	Blue Cross Arena	L 8–9	OT	4,855	9–4
14	March 25, 2023	@ Las Vegas Desert Dogs	Michelob Ultra Arena	L 7–12		5,430	9–5
15	April 2, 2023	@ Philadelphia Wings	Wells Fargo Center (Philadelphia)	L 13–14	OT	9,935	9–6
16	April 8, 2023	Albany FireWolves	Blue Cross Arena	L 12–14		4,628	9–7
17	April 22, 2023	Georgia Swarm	Blue Cross Arena	W 12–10		5,577	10–7
18	April 29, 2023	Philadelphia Wings	Blue Cross Arena	L 11–14		5,811	10–8

=== Playoffs ===
Game	Date	Opponent	Location	Score	OT	Attendance	Record
Eastern Conference Quarterfinals	May 6, 2023	@ Buffalo Bandits	KeyBank Center	L 8–20		14,794	0–1

== Roster ==
Rochester Knighthawks roster
Active (21-man) roster		Inactive roster	Coaches
Goaltenders: 49 (Canada) Rylan Hartley; 1 (Canada) Riley Hutchcraft; Defensemen: 2 (Canada) Paul Dawson (C); 4 (Canada) Ethan Schott; 6 (Canada) Brad Gillies; 8 (Canada) Mitch Ogilvie; 15 (Canada) Matt Bennett; 23 (Canada) Curtis Romanchych; 27 (Canada) Tyler Halls; 29 (Canada) Tyler Biles	Forwards: 5 (Canada) Turner Evans; 7 (Canada) Thomas Vela; 9 (Canada) Curtis Knight (A); 10 (United States) Connor Fields; 18 (Canada) Austin Hasen; 19 (Canada) Holden Cattoni; 43 (Canada) Ryan Smith; 91 (Canada) Thomas Hoggarth; Transition: 17 (Canada) Ryland Rees; 67 (Canada) Jordan Stouros; 81 (Canada) Matt Gilray	Practice squad: 25 (Canada) Parker Pipher (T); 71 (Canada) Jeff Wittig (F); 93 (Canada) Pent Eistrat (F); Injured reserve: 37 (Canada) Dan Coates (D); 96 (Canada) Cory Highfield (T); Unable to play: 3 (Canada) Thomas Whitty (T); 52 (Canada) Carter Schott (T)	Head coach: Mike Hasen; Assistant coaches: Kyle Kallay; Pat O'Toole; Legend: * Suspended list; (C) Captain; (A) Alternate captain; updated 12/5/2023; NLL Transactions

=== Entry Draft ===
The 2022 NLL Entry Draft took place on September 10, 2022. The Knighthawks made the following selections:

Round	Overall	Player	College/Club
1	1	Thomas McConvey	Mimico Mountaineers – University of Virginia
1	18	Austin Hasen	Peterborough Lakers – Belmont Abbey College
2	25	Thomas Vela	Burnaby Jr A
3	45	Parker Pipher	Whitby Jr A
4	60	Spencer Bell	Hawkeyes (UCBLL) – Rochester Institute of Technology
4	65	Carter Schott	Whitby Jr A
