= 2023 Calgary Roughnecks season =

2023 Calgary Roughnecks
- League: NLL
- Division: West
- 2023 record: 13–5
- Home record: 7–2
- Road record: 6–3
- Goals for: 218
- Goals against: 167
- General Manager: Mike Board
- Coach: Josh Sanderson
- Captain: Eli Salama
- Arena: Scotiabank Saddledome
- Average attendance: 11,665

The Calgary Roughnecks are a lacrosse team based in Calgary, Alberta. The team plays in the National Lacrosse League (NLL). The 2023 season is the 21st in franchise history.

With the departure of Curtis Dickson to free agency, the Roughnecks named Jesse King as their ninth captain prior to the start of the season. Eli Salama and Curtis Manning were named assistant captains.

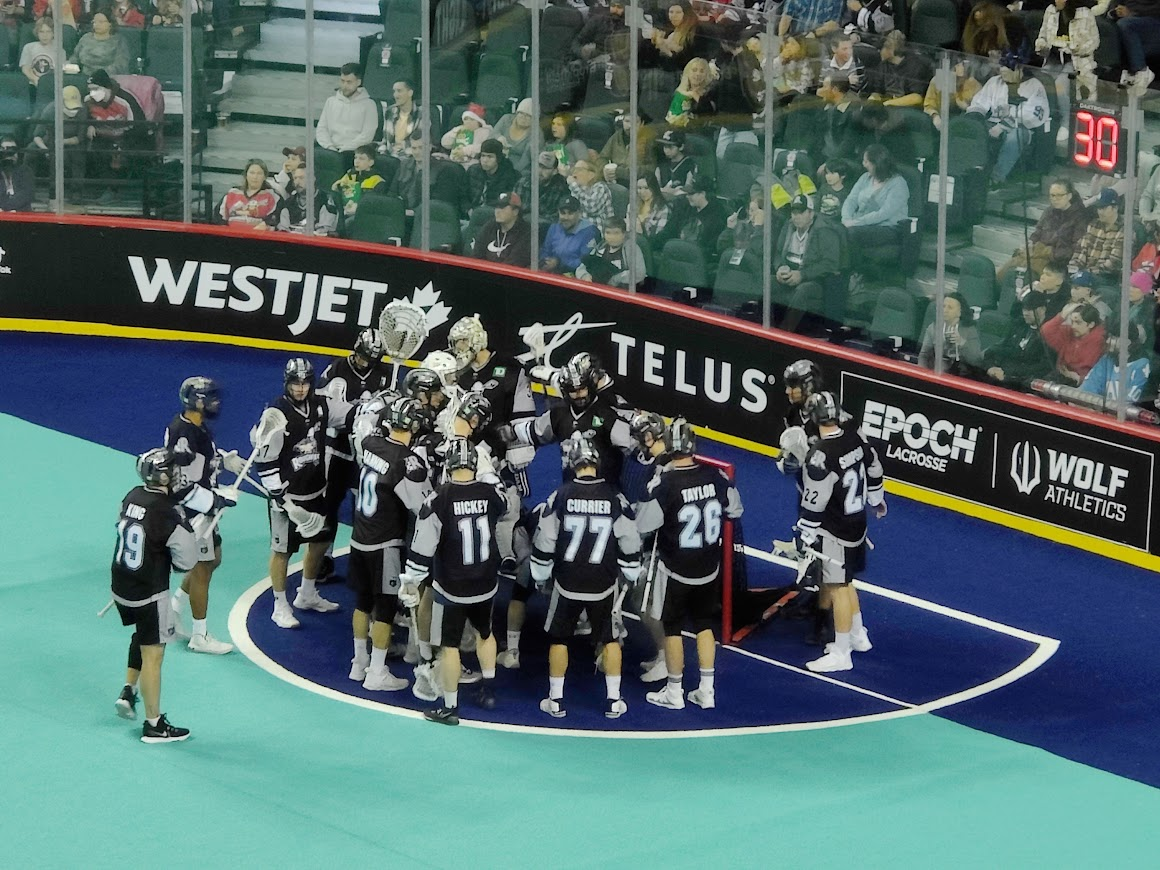
The Roughnecks before a preseason game on November 26, 2022

== Regular season ==
=== Final standings ===
East Conference
P	Team	GP	W	L	PCT	GB	Home	Road	GF	GA	Diff	GF/GP	GA/GP
1	Buffalo Bandits – xyz	18	14	4	.778	0.0	7–2	7–2	215	191	+24	11.94	10.61
2	Toronto Rock – x	18	13	5	.722	1.0	8–1	5–4	234	164	+70	13.00	9.11
3	Halifax Thunderbirds – x	18	10	8	.556	4.0	5–4	5–4	238	210	+28	13.22	11.67
4	Rochester Knighthawks – x	18	10	8	.556	4.0	6–3	4–5	218	214	+4	12.11	11.89
5	Philadelphia Wings	18	9	9	.500	5.0	4–5	5–4	200	211	−11	11.11	11.72
6	Georgia Swarm	18	8	10	.444	6.0	3–6	5–4	219	207	+12	12.17	11.50
7	New York Riptide	18	5	13	.278	9.0	3–6	2–7	201	243	−42	11.17	13.50
8	Albany FireWolves	18	3	15	.167	11.0	0–9	3–6	167	233	−66	9.28	12.94

West Conference
P	Team	GP	W	L	PCT	GB	Home	Road	GF	GA	Diff	GF/GP	GA/GP
1	San Diego Seals – xy	18	14	4	.778	0.0	7–2	7–2	240	193	+47	13.33	10.72
2	Calgary Roughnecks – x	18	13	5	.722	1.0	7–2	6–3	218	167	+51	12.11	9.28
3	Panther City Lacrosse Club – x	18	10	8	.556	4.0	6–3	4–5	204	193	+11	11.33	10.72
4	Colorado Mammoth – x	18	9	9	.500	5.0	7–2	2–7	190	208	−18	10.56	11.56
5	Saskatchewan Rush	18	8	10	.444	6.0	5–4	3–6	204	212	−8	11.33	11.78
6	Las Vegas Desert Dogs	18	5	13	.278	9.0	4–5	1–8	179	222	−43	9.94	12.33
7	Vancouver Warriors	18	4	14	.222	10.0	2–7	2–7	188	247	−59	10.44	13.72

== Game log ==
=== Pre-season ===
Game	Date	Opponent	Location	Score	OT	Attendance	Record
1	November 12, 2022	@ Rochester Knighthawks	Brampton	W 11–9			1–0
2	November 13, 2022	@ Albany FireWolves	Toronto Rock Athletic Centre	L 9–16			1–1
3	November 26, 2022	Saskatchewan Rush	Scotiabank Saddledome	L 8–9	OT		1–2

=== Regular season ===
Game	Date	Opponent	Location	Score	OT	Attendance	Record
1	December 10, 2022	Vancouver Warriors	Scotiabank Saddledome	W 11–9		7,500	1–0
2	December 16, 2022	@ Vancouver Warriors	Rogers Arena	W 14–5		8,369	2–0
3	December 30, 2022	San Diego Seals	Scotiabank Saddledome	L 14–17		10,599	2–1
4	January 7, 2023	@ Colorado Mammoth	Ball Arena	L 8–9		11,239	2–2
5	January 14, 2023	San Diego Seals	Scotiabank Saddledome	W 14–10		10,113	3–2
6	January 28, 2023	Toronto Rock	Scotiabank Saddledome	L 10–11	OT	9,037	3–3
7	February 4, 2023	@ Halifax Thunderbirds	Scotiabank Centre	W 12–11	OT	9,497	4–3
8	February 10, 2023	Saskatchewan Rush	Scotiabank Saddledome	W 13–6		14,070	5–3
9	February 11, 2023	Colorado Mammoth	Scotiabank Saddledome	W 13–9		11,819	6–3
10	February 17, 2023	@ Vancouver Warriors	Rogers Arena	W 14–9		7,538	7–3
11	February 24, 2023	@ Las Vegas Desert Dogs	Michelob Ultra Arena	L 9–11		4,814	7–4
12	March 10, 2023	@ Colorado Mammoth	Ball Arena	W 16–10		9,632	8–4
13	March 17, 2023	Saskatchewan Rush	Scotiabank Saddledome	W 11–6		17,444	9–4
14	March 25, 2023	@ Saskatchewan Rush	SaskTel Centre	W 14–6		8,408	10–4
15	March 31, 2023	@ San Diego Seals	Pechanga Arena	L 8–14		3,114	10–5
16	April 8, 2023	Panther City	Scotiabank Saddledome	W 12–5		11,404	11–5
17	April 14, 2023	Las Vegas Desert Dogs	Scotiabank Saddledome	W 12–7		12,998	12–5
18	April 21, 2023	@ Panther City	Dickies Arena	W 13–12		3,063	13–5

=== Playoffs ===
Game	Date	Opponent	Location	Score	OT	Attendance	Record
Western Conference Quarterfinals	May 6, 2023	Panther City Lacrosse Club	Scotiabank Saddledome	W 12–9		10,104	1–0
Western Conference Finals (game 1)	May 11, 2023	@ Colorado Mammoth	Ball Arena	L 7–8		8,183	1–1
Western Conference Finals (game 2)	May 13, 2023	Colorado Mammoth	Scotiabank Saddledome	W 13–12		7,681	2–1
Western Conference Finals (game 3)	May 20, 2023	@ Colorado Mammoth	Ball Arena	L 7–9		8,251	2–2

== Roster ==
Calgary Roughnecks roster
Active (21-man) roster		Inactive roster	Coaches
Goaltenders: 34 (Canada) Cam MacLeod; 88 (Canada) Aden Walsh; Defencemen: 6 (Canada) Griffen Hall; 10 (Canada) Brayden Laity; 11 (Canada) Tyler Hendrycks; 14 (Canada) Matt Sykes; 18 (Canada) Harrison Matsuoka; 21 (Canada) Bennett Smith; 23 (Canada) Liam LeClair; 30 (Canada) Justin Inacio; 33 (Canada) Kyle Pepper; 45 (Canada) Jack Follows; 83 (Canada) Carter Cook	Forwards: 7 (Canada) Noah Manning; 12 (Canada) Tanner Cook; 20 (Canada) Mathieu Gautier; 55 (Canada) Brayden Mayea; 68 (Canada) Tyler Pace; 89 (Canada) Riley Loewen; 97 (Canada) Haiden Dickson; Transition: 13 (Canada) Eli Salama (C); 18 (Canada) Harrison Matsuoka; 29 (Canada) Riley Isaacs	Practice squad: 1 (Canada) Colby Bowman; 4 (Canada) Brett McIntyre; 48 (Canada) Justin Morgan	Head coach: Josh Sanderson; Assistant coaches: Troy Cordingley; Shawn Cable; Legend: * Suspended list; (C) Captain; (A) Alternate captain; updated 2025-12-13; NLL Transactions

=== Entry Draft ===
The 2022 NLL Entry Draft took place on September 10, 2022.

The Calgary Roughnecks selected:

Round	Overall	Player	Position	Year of Birth	College/Club
1	10	Seth Van Schepen	LO	2000	Whitby Jr A – University of Denver
2	43	Connor Nichols	G		Coquitlam Adanacs (BCJALL)
4	68	Jake Gillis	LO	1999	Rocky Mountaineers (RMLL)
5	84	Jacob Motiuk	RD	1999	Okotoks Raiders (RMLL)
6	99	Kaden Doughty	RD	2001	Langley Thunder (WLA)
