= 2023 Saskatchewan Rush season =

Professional lacrosse season in NLL

2023 Saskatchewan Rush
- League: NLL
- Division: West
- 2023 record: 8–10
- Home record: 5–4
- Road record: 3–6
- Goals for: 204
- Goals against: 212
- General Manager: Derek Keenan
- Coach: Jimmy Quinlan
- Arena: SaskTel Centre
- Average attendance: 8,609

The Saskatchewan Rush are a lacrosse team based in Saskatoon, Saskatchewan playing in the National Lacrosse League (NLL). The 2023 season is the 17th in franchise history, 7th in Saskatchewan.

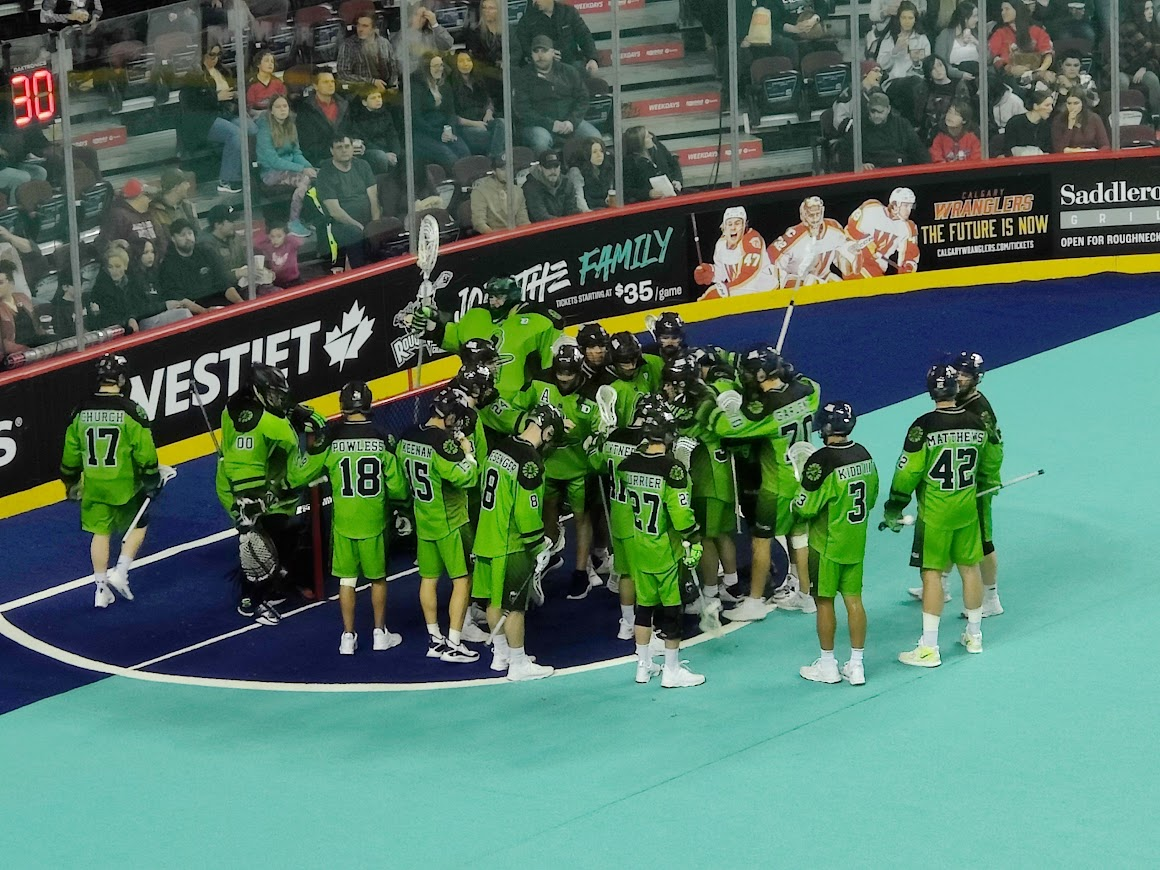
Saskatchewan Rush crowding around the net before a preseason game against the Calgary Roughnecks on November 26, 2022 at the Scotiabank Saddledome.

Jimmy Quinlan will be the head coach. In the 2022 season, Quinlan co-coached the last four games with Derek Keenan after Jeff McComb was fired mid-season.

== Current standings ==
East Conference
| P | Team | GP | W | L | PCT | GB | Home | Road | GF | GA | Diff | GF/GP | GA/GP |
|---|---|---|---|---|---|---|---|---|---|---|---|---|---|
| 1 | Buffalo Bandits – xyz | 18 | 14 | 4 | .778 | 0.0 | 7–2 | 7–2 | 215 | 191 | +24 | 11.94 | 10.61 |
| 2 | Toronto Rock – x | 18 | 13 | 5 | .722 | 1.0 | 8–1 | 5–4 | 234 | 164 | +70 | 13.00 | 9.11 |
| 3 | Halifax Thunderbirds – x | 18 | 10 | 8 | .556 | 4.0 | 5–4 | 5–4 | 238 | 210 | +28 | 13.22 | 11.67 |
| 4 | Rochester Knighthawks – x | 18 | 10 | 8 | .556 | 4.0 | 6–3 | 4–5 | 218 | 214 | +4 | 12.11 | 11.89 |
| 5 | Philadelphia Wings | 18 | 9 | 9 | .500 | 5.0 | 4–5 | 5–4 | 200 | 211 | −11 | 11.11 | 11.72 |
| 6 | Georgia Swarm | 18 | 8 | 10 | .444 | 6.0 | 3–6 | 5–4 | 219 | 207 | +12 | 12.17 | 11.50 |
| 7 | New York Riptide | 18 | 5 | 13 | .278 | 9.0 | 3–6 | 2–7 | 201 | 243 | −42 | 11.17 | 13.50 |
| 8 | Albany FireWolves | 18 | 3 | 15 | .167 | 11.0 | 0–9 | 3–6 | 167 | 233 | −66 | 9.28 | 12.94 |

West Conference
| P | Team | GP | W | L | PCT | GB | Home | Road | GF | GA | Diff | GF/GP | GA/GP |
|---|---|---|---|---|---|---|---|---|---|---|---|---|---|
| 1 | San Diego Seals – xy | 18 | 14 | 4 | .778 | 0.0 | 7–2 | 7–2 | 240 | 193 | +47 | 13.33 | 10.72 |
| 2 | Calgary Roughnecks – x | 18 | 13 | 5 | .722 | 1.0 | 7–2 | 6–3 | 218 | 167 | +51 | 12.11 | 9.28 |
| 3 | Panther City Lacrosse Club – x | 18 | 10 | 8 | .556 | 4.0 | 6–3 | 4–5 | 204 | 193 | +11 | 11.33 | 10.72 |
| 4 | Colorado Mammoth – x | 18 | 9 | 9 | .500 | 5.0 | 7–2 | 2–7 | 190 | 208 | −18 | 10.56 | 11.56 |
| 5 | Saskatchewan Rush | 18 | 8 | 10 | .444 | 6.0 | 5–4 | 3–6 | 204 | 212 | −8 | 11.33 | 11.78 |
| 6 | Las Vegas Desert Dogs | 18 | 5 | 13 | .278 | 9.0 | 4–5 | 1–8 | 179 | 222 | −43 | 9.94 | 12.33 |
| 7 | Vancouver Warriors | 18 | 4 | 14 | .222 | 10.0 | 2–7 | 2–7 | 188 | 247 | −59 | 10.44 | 13.72 |

== Game log ==
=== Regular season ===
| Game | Date | Opponent | Location | Score | OT | Attendance | Record |
|---|---|---|---|---|---|---|---|
| 1 | December 3, 2022 | Colorado Mammoth | SaskTel Centre | W 18–6 | | 7,736 | 1–0 |
| 2 | December 9, 2022 | @ San Diego Seals | Pechanga Arena | L 12–13 | OT | 7,471 | 1–1 |
| 3 | December 31, 2022 | Panther City Lacrosse Club | SaskTel Centre | W 11–9 | | 8,663 | 2–1 |
| 4 | January 13, 2023 | @ Colorado Mammoth | Ball Arena | L 10–11 | OT | 8,952 | 2–2 |
| 5 | January 28, 2023 | Las Vegas Desert Dogs | SaskTel Centre | W 15–10 | | 9,366 | 3–2 |
| 6 | February 4, 2023 | @ Vancouver Warriors | Rogers Arena | W 14–8 | | 7,803 | 4–2 |
| 7 | February 10, 2023 | @ Calgary Roughnecks | Scotiabank Saddledome | L 6–13 | | 14,070 | 4–3 |
| 8 | February 17, 2023 | @ San Diego Seals | Pechanga Arena | W 16–11 | | 4,144 | 5–3 |
| 9 | February 25, 2023 | Vancouver Warriors | SaskTel Centre | L 12–16 | | 8,648 | 5–4 |
| 10 | March 4, 2023 | @ Panther City Lacrosse Club | Dickies Arena | L 10–16 | | 3,478 | 5–5 |
| 11 | March 11, 2023 | San Diego Seals | SaskTel Centre | L 11–12 | | 7,425 | 5–6 |
| 12 | March 17, 2023 | @ Calgary Roughnecks | Scotiabank Saddledome | L 6–11 | | 17,444 | 5–7 |
| 13 | March 25, 2023 | Calgary Roughnecks | SaskTel Centre | L 6–14 | | 8,408 | 5–8 |
| 14 | April 1, 2023 | Vancouver Warriors | SaskTel Centre | W 12–11 | OT | 7,711 | 6–8 |
| 15 | April 8, 2023 | @ Georgia Swarm | Gas South Arena | L 9–13 | | 9,332 | 6–9 |
| 16 | April 15, 2023 | Halifax Thunderbirds | SaskTel Centre | L 11–15 | | 8,746 | 6–10 |
| 17 | April 22, 2023 | Colorado Mammoth | SaskTel Centre | W 12–11 | | 10,781 | 7–10 |
| 18 | April 29, 2023 | @ Las Vegas Desert Dogs | Michelob Ultra Arena | W 13–12 | | 6,947 | 8–10 |

== Current roster ==
Saskatchewan Rush roster
| Active (21-man) roster | | Inactive roster | Coaches |
|---|---|---|---|
| Goaltenders: 0 (Canada) Alex Buque; 46 (Canada) Laine Hruska; 61 (Canada) Eric Penney; Defencemen: 77 (Canada) Ryan Barnable; 2 (Canada) Matt Beers; 23 (Canada) Ryan Dilks; 70 (Canada) Holden Garlent; 3 (Canada) Bobby Kidd III; 13 (Canada) Connor McClelland; 6 (Canada) Isaac Ngyou; 4 (Canada) Kyle Rubisch (A); 95 (Canada) Jerrett Smith | Forwards: 17 (Canada) Robert Church; 32 (Canada) Matthew Dinsdale; 25 (Canada) Ryan Keenan; 41 (Canada) Dan Lintner; 33 (Canada) Austin Madronic; 11 (Canada) Mike Mallory; 42 (Canada) Mark Matthews (A); 9 (Canada) Clark Walter; Transition: 43 (Canada) Jake Boudreau; 22 (Canada) Wyatt Haux; 8 (Canada) Mike Messenger; 72 (Canada) Jeremy Searle | | Head coach: Jimmy Quinlan; Assistant coaches: Cam Sedgwick - Offensive Coach; Jeremy Tallevi - Defensive Coach; Legend: * Suspended list; (C) Captain; (A) Alternate captain; Roster updated 2022-11-01; NLL Transactions |

=== Entry Draft ===
The 2022 NLL Entry Draft took place on September 10, 2022. The Rush made the following selections:

| Round | Overall | Player | College/Club |
|---|---|---|---|
| 1 | 6 | Austin Madronic | Victoria Shamrocks – Harvard |
| 2 | 40 | Isaac Ngyou | Langley Jr A |
| 3 | 49 | Cam Badour | Duke University |
| 4 | 64 | Jeremy Searle | Orangeville Jr A |
| 5 | 80 | Gabriel Procyk | Maple Ridge – UMass |
| 6 | 95 | Carter Brand | University of Denver/Limestone |

== See also ==
- 2023 NLL season
