= 2023 Vancouver Warriors season =

Professional lacrosse team

2023 Vancouver Warriors
- League: NLL
- Division: 7th West
- 2023 record: 4–14
- Home record: 2–7
- Road record: 2–7
- Goals for: 188
- Goals against: 247
- General Manager: Dan Richardson
- Coach: Troy Cordingley
- Captain: Matt Beers
- Alternate captains: Ian Hawksbee; Logan Schuss
- Arena: Rogers Arena
- Average attendance: 8,165

Team leaders
- Goals: Keegan Bal (34)
- Assists: Keegan Bal (53)
- Points: Keegan Bal (87)
- Penalties in minutes: Shawn Evans (82)
- Loose Balls: Reid Bowering (210)
- Wins: Aaron Bold (3)
- Goals against average: Aaron Bold (11.95)

The Vancouver Warriors are a professional lacrosse team based in Vancouver, British Columbia. The team plays in the National Lacrosse League (NLL). The 2023 season was the 23rd in franchise history and the 9th season in Vancouver. The franchise previously played in Everett, Washington, San Jose, and Albany, New York.

Troy Cordingley took over the head coaching position during the season after the Warriors started 6-12 under Chris Gill, whose contract was not renewed.

== Regular season ==
=== Final standings ===
East Conference
P	Team	GP	W	L	PCT	GB	Home	Road	GF	GA	Diff	GF/GP	GA/GP
1	Buffalo Bandits – xyz	18	14	4	.778	0.0	7–2	7–2	215	191	+24	11.94	10.61
2	Toronto Rock – x	18	13	5	.722	1.0	8–1	5–4	234	164	+70	13.00	9.11
3	Halifax Thunderbirds – x	18	10	8	.556	4.0	5–4	5–4	238	210	+28	13.22	11.67
4	Rochester Knighthawks – x	18	10	8	.556	4.0	6–3	4–5	218	214	+4	12.11	11.89
5	Philadelphia Wings	18	9	9	.500	5.0	4–5	5–4	200	211	−11	11.11	11.72
6	Georgia Swarm	18	8	10	.444	6.0	3–6	5–4	219	207	+12	12.17	11.50
7	New York Riptide	18	5	13	.278	9.0	3–6	2–7	201	243	−42	11.17	13.50
8	Albany FireWolves	18	3	15	.167	11.0	0–9	3–6	167	233	−66	9.28	12.94

West Conference
P	Team	GP	W	L	PCT	GB	Home	Road	GF	GA	Diff	GF/GP	GA/GP
1	San Diego Seals – xy	18	14	4	.778	0.0	7–2	7–2	240	193	+47	13.33	10.72
2	Calgary Roughnecks – x	18	13	5	.722	1.0	7–2	6–3	218	167	+51	12.11	9.28
3	Panther City Lacrosse Club – x	18	10	8	.556	4.0	6–3	4–5	204	193	+11	11.33	10.72
4	Colorado Mammoth – x	18	9	9	.500	5.0	7–2	2–7	190	208	−18	10.56	11.56
5	Saskatchewan Rush	18	8	10	.444	6.0	5–4	3–6	204	212	−8	11.33	11.78
6	Las Vegas Desert Dogs	18	5	13	.278	9.0	4–5	1–8	179	222	−43	9.94	12.33
7	Vancouver Warriors	18	4	14	.222	10.0	2–7	2–7	188	247	−59	10.44	13.72

=== Game log ===
Game	Date	Opponent	Location	Score	OT	Attendance	Record
1	December 3, 2022	@ Toronto Rock	FirstOntario Centre	L 8–19		7,344	0–1
2	December 10, 2022	@ Calgary Roughnecks	Scotiabank Saddledome	L 9–11		7,500	0–2
3	December 16, 2022	Calgary Roughnecks	Rogers Arena	L 5–14		8,369	0–3
4	January 7, 2023	@ San Diego Seals	Pechanga Arena	L 11–16		6,283	0–4
5	January 14, 2023	Las Vegas Desert Dogs	Rogers Arena	W 19–16		8,483	1–4
6	January 20, 2023	@ Las Vegas Desert Dogs	Michelob Ultra Arena	L 14–15		5,057	1–5
7	January 28, 2023	Panther City Lacrosse Club	Rogers Arena	L 7–20		7,836	1–6
8	February 4, 2023	Saskatchewan Rush	Rogers Arena	L 8–14		7,803	1–7
9	February 11, 2023	@ Panther City Lacrosse Club	Dickies Arena	L 13–14		3,657	1–8
10	February 17, 2023	Calgary Roughnecks	Rogers Arena	L 9–14		7,538	1–9
11	February 25, 2023	@ Saskatchewan Rush	SaskTel Centre	W 16–12		8,648	2–9
12	March 11, 2023	@ Las Vegas Desert Dogs	Michelob Ultra Arena	W 14–5		7,914	3–9
13	March 17, 2023	San Diego Seals	Rogers Arena	L 9–16		8,583	3–10
14	March 25, 2023	Colorado Mammoth	Rogers Arena	W 14–12		7,837	4–10
15	April 1, 2023	@ Saskatchewan Rush	SaskTel Centre	L 11–12	OT	7,711	4–11
16	April 8, 2023	@ Colorado Mammoth	Ball Arena	L 5–12		10,419	4–12
17	April 15, 2023	Panther City Lacrosse Club	Rogers Arena	L 8–9		7,532	4–13
18	April 29, 2023	New York Riptide	Rogers Arena	L 8–16		9,508	4–14

== Roster ==
Vancouver Warriors roster
Active (21-man) roster		Inactive roster	Coaches
Goaltenders: 77 (Canada) Aaron Bold; 39 (Canada) Steve Fryer; 36 (Canada) Brody Harris; 29 (Canada) Aden Walsh; 35 (Canada) Ethan Woods; Defensemen: 27 (Canada) Owen Barker; 28 (Canada) Reid Bowering; 19 (Canada) Steph Charbonneau; 7 (Canada) Tyler Codron (A); 95 (Canada) Tyrell Hamer-Jackson; 81 (Canada) Anthony Kalinich; 51 (Canada) Tyson Kirkness; 2 (Canada) Brett Mydske (C); 63 (Canada) Harrison Smith; 50 (Canada) Aidan Solomon	Forwards: 45 (Canada) Keegan Bal; 41 (Canada) Isaac Bot; 8 (Canada) Adam Charalambides; 62 (Canada) Matt Delmonico; 15 (Canada) Shawn Evans; 11 (Canada) Dean Fairall; 17 (Canada) Connor Goodwin; (Canada) Drew Kask; 67 (Canada) Kyle Killen; 10 (Canada) Riley Loewen; 96 (Canada) Ryan Martel; 87 (Haudenosaunee) Chase Scanlan; 18 (Canada) Logan Schuss; Transition: 44 (Canada) Jonathan Gagliardi; 14 (Canada) Brandon Goodwin; 54 (Canada) Marcus Klarich; (Canada) Derek Lloyd; 68 (Canada) Jacob Motiuk; 19 (Canada) Justin Salt; (Canada) Thomas Semple		Head coach: Troy Cordingley; Assistant coaches: Phil Sanderson; Curtis Hodgson; Dan Perreault (video); Dwight Maetche (goaltending); Legend: * Suspended list; (C) Captain; (A) Alternate captain; Roster updated NLL Transactions

=== Entry Draft ===
The 2022 NLL Entry Draft took place on September 10, 2022.

The Vancouver Warriors selected:

Round	Overall	Player	Position	Year of Birth	College/Club
1	3	Owen Grant	defence		Delaware University and Toronto Junior Beaches.
2	32	Marcus Klarich	forward		Burnaby Jr Lakers
3	46	Aidan Solomon	defence		Victoria Shamrocks Jr A
3	52	Chase Cosgrove	goalie		Windsor Clippers Jr B
4	61	Henry Follows	forward		Cornell University
4	63	Trent Kellner	defence		Langley Thunder – Limestone University
5	77	Brian Robb	defence		University of Indianapolis
5	85	Drew Kask	forward		Langley Jr Thunder – Lewis University
6	92	Hunter Vines	forward		High Point University
