= 2023 Panther City Lacrosse Club season =

2023 Panther City Lacrosse Club
- League: NLL
- Division: TBD West
- 2023 record: 10–8
- Home record: 6–3
- Road record: 4–5
- Goals for: 204
- Goals against: 193
- General Manager: Bob Hamley
- Coach: Tracey Kelusky
- Captain: TBD
- Alternate captains: TBD
- Arena: Dickies Arena
- Average attendance: 2,813

The Panther City Lacrosse Club is a professional lacrosse team based in Fort Worth, Texas. The team plays in the National Lacrosse League (NLL). The 2023 season is the second season in franchise history.

== Regular season ==
=== Final standings ===
East Conference
P	Team	GP	W	L	PCT	GB	Home	Road	GF	GA	Diff	GF/GP	GA/GP
1	Buffalo Bandits – xyz	18	14	4	.778	0.0	7–2	7–2	215	191	+24	11.94	10.61
2	Toronto Rock – x	18	13	5	.722	1.0	8–1	5–4	234	164	+70	13.00	9.11
3	Halifax Thunderbirds – x	18	10	8	.556	4.0	5–4	5–4	238	210	+28	13.22	11.67
4	Rochester Knighthawks – x	18	10	8	.556	4.0	6–3	4–5	218	214	+4	12.11	11.89
5	Philadelphia Wings	18	9	9	.500	5.0	4–5	5–4	200	211	−11	11.11	11.72
6	Georgia Swarm	18	8	10	.444	6.0	3–6	5–4	219	207	+12	12.17	11.50
7	New York Riptide	18	5	13	.278	9.0	3–6	2–7	201	243	−42	11.17	13.50
8	Albany FireWolves	18	3	15	.167	11.0	0–9	3–6	167	233	−66	9.28	12.94

West Conference
P	Team	GP	W	L	PCT	GB	Home	Road	GF	GA	Diff	GF/GP	GA/GP
1	San Diego Seals – xy	18	14	4	.778	0.0	7–2	7–2	240	193	+47	13.33	10.72
2	Calgary Roughnecks – x	18	13	5	.722	1.0	7–2	6–3	218	167	+51	12.11	9.28
3	Panther City Lacrosse Club – x	18	10	8	.556	4.0	6–3	4–5	204	193	+11	11.33	10.72
4	Colorado Mammoth – x	18	9	9	.500	5.0	7–2	2–7	190	208	−18	10.56	11.56
5	Saskatchewan Rush	18	8	10	.444	6.0	5–4	3–6	204	212	−8	11.33	11.78
6	Las Vegas Desert Dogs	18	5	13	.278	9.0	4–5	1–8	179	222	−43	9.94	12.33
7	Vancouver Warriors	18	4	14	.222	10.0	2–7	2–7	188	247	−59	10.44	13.72

=== Game log ===
Game	Date	Opponent	Location	Score	OT	Attendance	Record
1	December 9, 2022	Las Vegas Desert Dogs	Dickies Arena	W 13–11		4,184	1–0
2	December 16, 2022	@ Las Vegas Desert Dogs	Michelob Ultra Arena	W 9–3		7,072	2–0
3	December 17, 2022	Colorado Mammoth	Dickies Arena	L 9–12		1,842	2–1
4	December 31, 2022	@ Saskatchewan Rush	SaskTel Centre	L 9–11		8,663	2–2
5	January 7, 2023	@ Rochester Knighthawks	Blue Cross Arena	L 9–17		4,062	2–3
6	January 14, 2023	@ Philadelphia Wings	Wells Fargo Center (Philadelphia)	W 12–10		10,234	3–3
7	January 28, 2023	@ Vancouver Warriors	Rogers Arena	W 20–7		7,836	4–3
8	February 4, 2023	@ San Diego Seals	Pechanga Arena	L 10–12		4,214	4–4
9	February 11, 2023	Vancouver Warriors	Dickies Arena	W 14–13		3,657	5–4
10	February 18, 2023	Colorado Mammoth	Dickies Arena	W 13–7		2,421	6–4
11	February 24, 2023	@ Colorado Mammoth	Ball Arena	L 12–14		9,973	6–5
12	March 4, 2023	Saskatchewan Rush	Dickies Arena	W 16–10		3,478	7–5
13	March 18, 2023	Las Vegas Desert Dogs	Dickies Arena	W 11–8		2,238	8–5
14	March 24, 2023	San Diego Seals	Dickies Arena	L 9–17		2,104	8–6
15	April 1, 2023	Albany FireWolves	Dickies Arena	W 12–8		2,329	9–6
16	April 8, 2023	@ Calgary Roughnecks	Scotiabank Saddledome	L 5–12		11,404	9–7
17	April 15, 2023	@ Vancouver Warriors	Rogers Arena	W 9–8		7,532	10–7
18	April 21, 2023	Calgary Roughnecks	Dickies Arena	L 12–13		3,063	10–8

=== Playoffs ===
Game	Date	Opponent	Location	Score	OT	Attendance	Record
western Conference Quarterfinals	May 6, 2023	@ Calgary Roughnecks	Scotiabank Saddledome	L 9–12		10,104	0–1

== Roster ==
Panther City LC roster
Active (21-man) roster		Inactive roster	Coaches
Goaltenders: 39 Nick Damude; Cam MacLeod; Defensemen: 7 Tyler Burton; 21 Liam Byrnes; 10 Chad Cummings; 8 Pat Foley; 94 Matt Hossack; 22 Evan Messenger; Brooker Muir; 12 Liam Patten; Nate Wade	Forwards: 19 Phil Caputo; 15 Patrick Dodds; 3 Jonathan Donville; 22 Dean Fairall; 28 Nathan Grenon; Will Malcom; 7 Cam Milligan; Cam Wengreniuk; Transition: Tony Malcom; 26 Josh Medeiros	Practice squad: 55 Dylan Hutchison; Mathieu Gautier; Ronin Pusch; Holdout: 13 Connor Sellars	Head coach: Tracey Kelusky; Assistant coaches: Steve Toll; Kyle Goundrey; Legend: * Suspended list; (C) Captain; (A) Alternate captain; updated 2022-11-28; NLL Transactions

=== Entry Draft ===
The 2022 NLL Entry Draft took place on September 10, 2022. Panther City made the following selections:

Round	Overall	Player	College/Club
1	5	Jason Knox	Burlington Chiefs – Ohio State University
1	9	Mathieu Gautier	Edmonton Miners
1	21	Colton Lidstone	Nanaimo Timbermen – Robert Morris University
2	30	Ronin Pusch	Edmonton Miners
2	37	Carter Zavitz	St. Catharines Jr A – Princeton University
3	47	Petey Lasala	University of Virginia
5	79	Kaleb Martin	Whitby Jr A
6	94	Jackson Rose	Lakeway Texas – St. Bonaventure
6	97	Michael Ippolito	High Point University
