= 2023 Georgia Swarm season =

2023 Georgia Swarm
- League: NLL
- Division: East
- 2023 record: 8–10
- Home record: 3–6
- Road record: 5–4
- Goals for: 219
- Goals against: 207
- General Manager: John J. Arlotta
- Coach: Ed Comeau
- Arena: Gas South Arena
- Average attendance: 8,624

The 2023 Georgia Swarm season is the 7th season of the Georgia Swarm, a lacrosse team based in Duluth, Georgia, playing in the National Lacrosse League. The team was formerly based in Saint Paul, Minnesota and was known as the Minnesota Swarm.

== Regular season ==
=== Current standings ===
East Conference
P	Team	GP	W	L	PCT	GB	Home	Road	GF	GA	Diff	GF/GP	GA/GP
1	Buffalo Bandits – xyz	18	14	4	.778	0.0	7–2	7–2	215	191	+24	11.94	10.61
2	Toronto Rock – x	18	13	5	.722	1.0	8–1	5–4	234	164	+70	13.00	9.11
3	Halifax Thunderbirds – x	18	10	8	.556	4.0	5–4	5–4	238	210	+28	13.22	11.67
4	Rochester Knighthawks – x	18	10	8	.556	4.0	6–3	4–5	218	214	+4	12.11	11.89
5	Philadelphia Wings	18	9	9	.500	5.0	4–5	5–4	200	211	−11	11.11	11.72
6	Georgia Swarm	18	8	10	.444	6.0	3–6	5–4	219	207	+12	12.17	11.50
7	New York Riptide	18	5	13	.278	9.0	3–6	2–7	201	243	−42	11.17	13.50
8	Albany FireWolves	18	3	15	.167	11.0	0–9	3–6	167	233	−66	9.28	12.94

West Conference
P	Team	GP	W	L	PCT	GB	Home	Road	GF	GA	Diff	GF/GP	GA/GP
1	San Diego Seals – xy	18	14	4	.778	0.0	7–2	7–2	240	193	+47	13.33	10.72
2	Calgary Roughnecks – x	18	13	5	.722	1.0	7–2	6–3	218	167	+51	12.11	9.28
3	Panther City Lacrosse Club – x	18	10	8	.556	4.0	6–3	4–5	204	193	+11	11.33	10.72
4	Colorado Mammoth – x	18	9	9	.500	5.0	7–2	2–7	190	208	−18	10.56	11.56
5	Saskatchewan Rush	18	8	10	.444	6.0	5–4	3–6	204	212	−8	11.33	11.78
6	Las Vegas Desert Dogs	18	5	13	.278	9.0	4–5	1–8	179	222	−43	9.94	12.33
7	Vancouver Warriors	18	4	14	.222	10.0	2–7	2–7	188	247	−59	10.44	13.72

== Game log ==
Game	Date	Opponent	Location	Score	OT	Attendance	Record
1	December 3, 2022	Rochester Knighthawks	Gas South Arena	L 11–16		6,821	0–1
2	December 17, 2022	Philadelphia Wings	Gas South Arena	L 12–13		8,085	0–2
3	January 7, 2023	Buffalo Bandits	Gas South Arena	L 9–18		8,304	0–3
4	January 14, 2023	@ Buffalo Bandits	KeyBank Center	L 9–11		14,189	0–4
5	February 3, 2023	@ Colorado Mammoth	Ball Arena	L 10–13		9,271	0–5
6	February 10, 2023	Toronto Rock	Gas South Arena	L 10–11		8,544	0–6
7	February 18, 2023	@ Toronto Rock	FirstOntario Centre	L 7–16		8,912	0–7
8	February 25, 2023	Albany FireWolves	Gas South Arena	W 20–4		8,715	1–7
9	March 4, 2023	@ Albany FireWolves	MVP Arena	W 9–8	OT	3,492	2–7
10	March 12, 2023	Rochester Knighthawks	Gas South Arena	L 18–19		9,064	2–8
11	March 18, 2023	@ Philadelphia Wings	Wells Fargo Center (Philadelphia)	W 13–12		7,840	3–8
12	March 25, 2023	@ New York Riptide	Nassau Coliseum	W 13–8		5,907	4–8
13	March 31, 2023	New York Riptide	Gas South Arena	W 12–7		9,276	5–8
14	April 2, 2023	@ Halifax Thunderbirds	Scotiabank Centre	W 17–7		7,661	6–8
15	April 8, 2023	Saskatchewan Rush	Gas South Arena	W 13–9		9,332	7–8
16	April 16, 2023	@ Albany FireWolves	MVP Arena	W 15–6		3,661	8–8
17	April 22, 2023	@ Rochester Knighthawks	Blue Cross Arena	L 10–12		5,577	8–9
18	April 29, 2023	Halifax Thunderbirds	Gas South Arena	L 11–17		9,475	8–10

== Roster ==
Georgia Swarm roster
Active (21-man) roster		Inactive roster	Coaches
Goaltenders: 39 (Canada) Brett Dobson; 1 (Canada) Craig Wende; Defensemen: 91 (United States) TJ Comizio; 45 (Canada) Jeff Henrick; 5 (United States) Mike Manley; 10 (Canada) Ethan Riggs; 27 (Canada) Adam Wiedemann	Forwards: 21 (Haudenosaunee) Brendan Bomberry; 8 (Canada) Tanner Buck; 32 (Canada) Shayne Jackson (A); 42 (Canada) Andrew Kew; 7 (Canada) Ryan Lanchbury; 19 (Haudenosaunee) Teioshontathe McComber; 33 (Haudenosaunee) Zach Miller; 4 (Haudenosaunee) Lyle Thompson; Transition: 55 (Canada) Bryan Cole; 37 (Canada) Robert Hudson; 24 (Canada) Jordan MacIntosh (C); 77 (Canada) Ryan MacSpadyen; 15 (Haudenosaunee) Kason Tarbell; 74 (Haudenosaunee) Jeremy Thompson	Practice squad: 40 (United States) Brett Beetow (D); 11 (Canada) Will Cecile (T); 78 Dustin Hill (G); (Haudenosaunee) Jerry Staats (D); Injured reserve: 2 (Haudenosaunee) Miles Thompson (F); Unable to play: (Canada) Jordan Gillis (D); (Canada) Justin Lemcke (D); 30 (Canada) Mike Poulin (G)	Head coach: Ed Comeau; Assistant coaches: Sean Ferris; Dan Ladouceur; Legend: * Suspended list; (C) Captain; (A) Alternate captain; Roster updated 2019-07-01; NLL Transactions

=== Entry Draft ===
The 2022 NLL Entry Draft took place on September 10, 2022. The Swarm made the following selections:

Round	Overall	Player	College/Club
1	11	Brett Dobson	Whitby Warriors – St. Bonaventure University
1	20	Brady Kearnan	Brooklin Lacrosse Club – Mercy College
3	48	Teioshontateh McComber	Nanaimo Timbermen – University of Albany
3	58	Brett Beetow	St. Bonaventure University
4	62	Elijah Gash	University of Albany**
5	81	Cross Ferrara	Salisbury University*
6	96	Jeff Connor	University of Virginia
