= 2023 Halifax Thunderbirds season =

2023 Halifax Thunderbirds
- League: NLL
- Division: East
- 2023 record: 10–8
- Home record: 5–4
- Road record: 5–4
- Goals for: 238
- Goals against: 210
- General Manager: Curt Styres
- Coach: Mike Accursi
- Arena: Scotiabank Centre
- Average attendance: 8,512

The 2023 Halifax Thunderbirds season is the third season in Halifax, Nova Scotia for the National Lacrosse League (NLL) franchise that began play in 2020 after relocating from Rochester, New York, where they operated as the Rochester Knighthawks. The Thunderbirds opened the 2023 season on December 2, 2022, against the Philadelphia Wings.

== Regular season ==
=== Final standings ===
East Conference
P	Team	GP	W	L	PCT	GB	Home	Road	GF	GA	Diff	GF/GP	GA/GP
1	Buffalo Bandits – xyz	18	14	4	.778	0.0	7–2	7–2	215	191	+24	11.94	10.61
2	Toronto Rock – x	18	13	5	.722	1.0	8–1	5–4	234	164	+70	13.00	9.11
3	Halifax Thunderbirds – x	18	10	8	.556	4.0	5–4	5–4	238	210	+28	13.22	11.67
4	Rochester Knighthawks – x	18	10	8	.556	4.0	6–3	4–5	218	214	+4	12.11	11.89
5	Philadelphia Wings	18	9	9	.500	5.0	4–5	5–4	200	211	−11	11.11	11.72
6	Georgia Swarm	18	8	10	.444	6.0	3–6	5–4	219	207	+12	12.17	11.50
7	New York Riptide	18	5	13	.278	9.0	3–6	2–7	201	243	−42	11.17	13.50
8	Albany FireWolves	18	3	15	.167	11.0	0–9	3–6	167	233	−66	9.28	12.94

West Conference
P	Team	GP	W	L	PCT	GB	Home	Road	GF	GA	Diff	GF/GP	GA/GP
1	San Diego Seals – xy	18	14	4	.778	0.0	7–2	7–2	240	193	+47	13.33	10.72
2	Calgary Roughnecks – x	18	13	5	.722	1.0	7–2	6–3	218	167	+51	12.11	9.28
3	Panther City Lacrosse Club – x	18	10	8	.556	4.0	6–3	4–5	204	193	+11	11.33	10.72
4	Colorado Mammoth – x	18	9	9	.500	5.0	7–2	2–7	190	208	−18	10.56	11.56
5	Saskatchewan Rush	18	8	10	.444	6.0	5–4	3–6	204	212	−8	11.33	11.78
6	Las Vegas Desert Dogs	18	5	13	.278	9.0	4–5	1–8	179	222	−43	9.94	12.33
7	Vancouver Warriors	18	4	14	.222	10.0	2–7	2–7	188	247	−59	10.44	13.72

== Game log ==
Game	Date	Opponent	Location	Score	OT	Attendance	Record
1	December 2, 2022	Philadelphia Wings	Scotiabank Centre	W 18–8		7,778	1–0
2	December 17, 2022	@ New York Riptide	Nassau Live Center	W 20–11		3,896	2–0
3	December 30, 2022	@ Buffalo Bandits	KeyBank Center	L 13–18		14,040	2–1
4	January 7, 2023	@ Albany FireWolves	MVP Arena	W 14–11		3,843	3–1
5	January 13, 2023	Albany FireWolves	Scotiabank Centre	L 10–11	OT	9,211	3–2
6	January 14, 2023	@ Toronto Rock	FirstOntario Centre	L 8–17		9,304	3–3
7	January 27, 2023	Rochester Knighthawks	Scotiabank Centre	W 17–7		7,985	4–3
8	February 4, 2023	Calgary Roughnecks	Scotiabank Centre	L 11–12	OT	9,497	4–4
9	February 11, 2023	@ Rochester Knighthawks	Blue Cross Arena	L 14–16		5,219	4–5
10	February 19, 2023	New York Riptide	Scotiabank Centre	W 13–12		7,783	5–5
11	March 3, 2023	Buffalo Bandits	Scotiabank Centre	L 9–10		6,724	5–6
12	March 10, 2023	@ Buffalo Bandits	KeyBank Center	L 9–10		14,896	5–7
13	March 18, 2023	Toronto Rock	Scotiabank Centre	W 14–12		9,957	6–7
14	March 25, 2023	@ Philadelphia Wings	Wells Fargo Center (Philadelphia)	W 14–10		9,819	7–7
15	April 2, 2023	Georgia Swarm	Scotiabank Centre	L 7–17		7,661	7–8
16	April 15, 2023	@ Saskatchewan Rush	SaskTel Centre	W 15–11		8,746	8–8
17	April 22, 2023	New York Riptide	Scotiabank Centre	W 15–6		10,008	9–8
18	April 29, 2023	@ Georgia Swarm	Gas South Arena	W 17–11		9,475	10–8

=== Playoffs ===
Game	Date	Opponent	Location	Score	OT	Attendance	Record
Eastern Conference Quarterfinals	May 5, 2023	@ Toronto Rock	FirstOntario Center	L 11–15		8,831	0–1

== Roster ==
Goaltenders

- 35 (Czech Republic) Peter Dubenski
- 76 (Haudenosaunee) Warren Hill

Defenceman

- 4 (Canada) Graeme Hossack
- 13 (Canada) Ethan O'Connor
- 14 (Canada) Daniel Amesbury
- 15 (Canada) Johnny Pearson
- 18 (Canada) Jake Withers
- 19 (Haudenosaunee) Nonkon Thompson
- 68 (Canada) Trevor Smyth

Forwards

- 00 (Canada) Alex Marinier
- 20 (Canada) Mike Robinson
- 24 (Canada) Clarke Petterson
- 28 (Republic of Ireland) Stephen Keogh
- 47 (United States) Cole Kirst
- 88 (Haudenosaunee) Cody Jamieson

Transition

- 2 (Canada) Casey Wilson
- 8 (United States) Austin Blumbergs
- 44 (Canada) Colton Armstrong

Practice

- 00 (Haudenosaunee) Johnny Jimerson
- 12 (Canada) Chet Koneczny
- 13 (Canada) Brandon Robinson
- 81 (Haudenosaunee) Clay Scanlan

Injured

Head Coach Mike Accursi

Assistant Coaches

- Chad Culp
- Jason Johnson
- Roger Chrysler
- Billy Dee Smith

Athletic Performance Coach

- Dan Noble

Equipment Manager

- Dave Sowden

=== Entry Draft ===
The 2022 NLL Entry Draft took place on September 10, 2022. The Thunderbirds made the following selections:

Round	Overall	Player	College/Club
1	12	Wake:Riat Bowhunter	Six Nations – Jacksonville University
2	29	Jerry Staats	Six Nations Chiefs – Syracuse University
3	54	Jon McConvey	Mimico Jr A – University of Vermont
3	55	Cole Kirst	Syracuse University
4	70	Chris Fake	Notre Dame University
5	86	Tanner Cole	Oakville Jr A
6	101	Keaton Brown	Orangeville Jr B
