= 2023 Buffalo Bandits season =

Lacrosse team season; NLL champions, fifth in team history

2023 Buffalo Bandits
- NLL Champions
- League: NLL
- Division: 1st East
- 2023 record: 14–4
- Home record: 7–2
- Road record: 7–2
- Goals for: 215
- Goals against: 191
- General Manager: Steve Dietrich
- Coach: John Tavares
- Captain: Steve Priolo
- Alternate captains: Dhane Smith, Nick Weiss
- Arena: KeyBank Center
- Average attendance: 14,731

Team leaders
- Goals: Josh Byrne (43)
- Assists: Dhane Smith (96)
- Points: Dhane Smith (132)
- Penalties in minutes: Steve Priolo (70)
- Loose Balls: Steve Priolo (143)
- Wins: Matt Vinc (14)
- Goals against average: Matt Vinc (10.42)

The Buffalo Bandits are a lacrosse team based in Buffalo, New York playing in the National Lacrosse League (NLL). The 2023 season was their 31st season in the NLL.

The Bandits won the Eastern Conference with a 14-4 record in the regular season, as well as first place overall, and home floor advantage throughout the playoffs. They beat the Rochester Knighthawks, 20-8, in the Eastern Conference Quarterfinals. The team would go on to sweep the Toronto Rock in two games in the Eastern Conference Finals, leading to a rematch against the Colorado Mammoth in the NLL Finals, in which Buffalo had fallen to in three games, in the 2022 season.

The Bandits went on to win Game 1 at home over the Mammoth, 14-13, and then lose Game 2, 16-10, on the road in Colorado. The Bandits went on to win the third and deciding game, 13-4, to win their first championship since 2008.

== Regular season ==
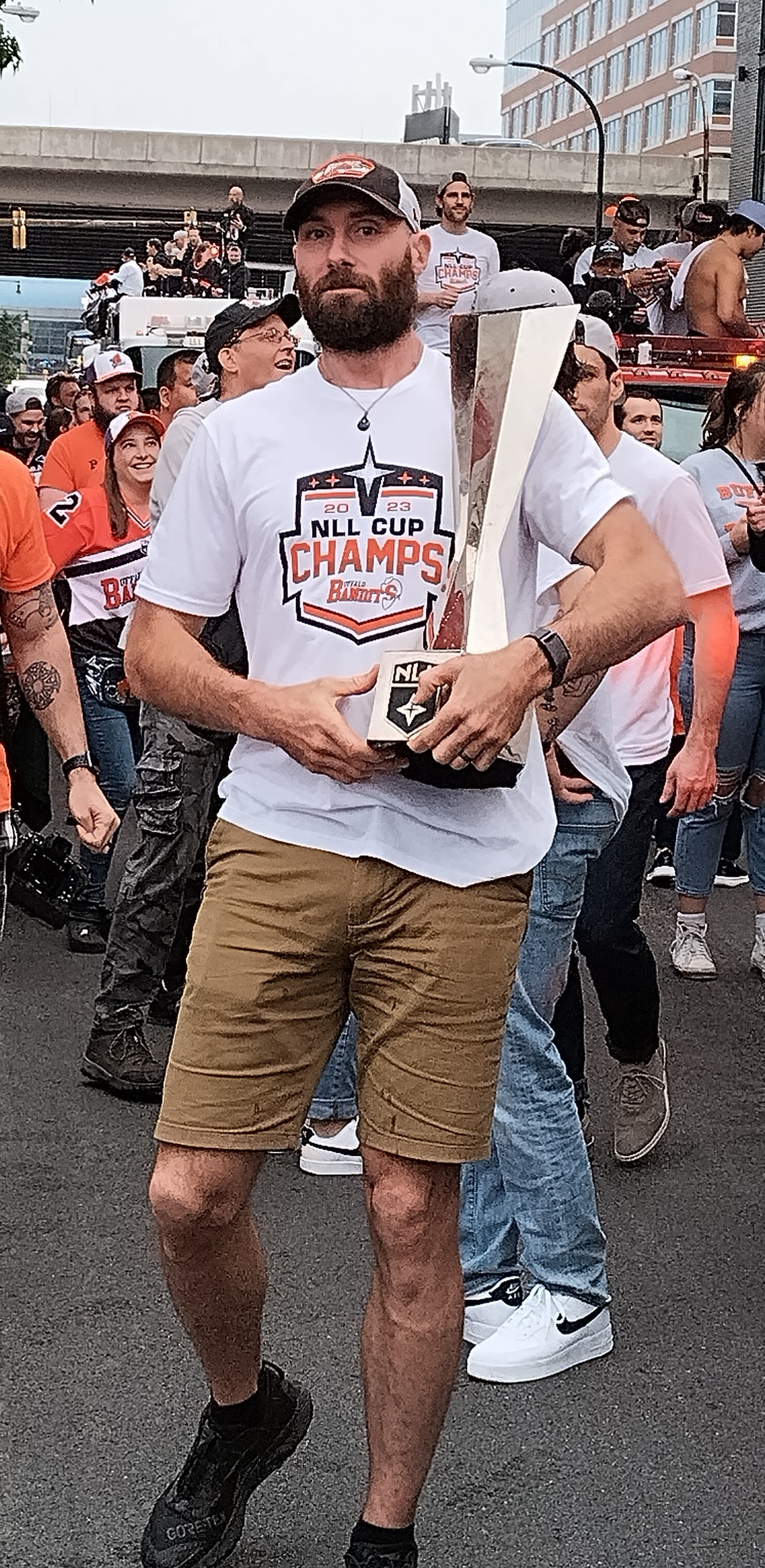
Team captain Steve Priolo holds the NLL Cup

NLL Standings Reference:

East Conference
P	Team	GP	W	L	PCT	GB	Home	Road	GF	GA	Diff	GF/GP	GA/GP
1	Buffalo Bandits – xyz	18	14	4	.778	0.0	7–2	7–2	215	191	+24	11.94	10.61
2	Toronto Rock – x	18	13	5	.722	1.0	8–1	5–4	234	164	+70	13.00	9.11
3	Halifax Thunderbirds – x	18	10	8	.556	4.0	5–4	5–4	238	210	+28	13.22	11.67
4	Rochester Knighthawks – x	18	10	8	.556	4.0	6–3	4–5	218	214	+4	12.11	11.89
5	Philadelphia Wings	18	9	9	.500	5.0	4–5	5–4	200	211	−11	11.11	11.72
6	Georgia Swarm	18	8	10	.444	6.0	3–6	5–4	219	207	+12	12.17	11.50
7	New York Riptide	18	5	13	.278	9.0	3–6	2–7	201	243	−42	11.17	13.50
8	Albany FireWolves	18	3	15	.167	11.0	0–9	3–6	167	233	−66	9.28	12.94

West Conference
P	Team	GP	W	L	PCT	GB	Home	Road	GF	GA	Diff	GF/GP	GA/GP
1	San Diego Seals – xy	18	14	4	.778	0.0	7–2	7–2	240	193	+47	13.33	10.72
2	Calgary Roughnecks – x	18	13	5	.722	1.0	7–2	6–3	218	167	+51	12.11	9.28
3	Panther City Lacrosse Club – x	18	10	8	.556	4.0	6–3	4–5	204	193	+11	11.33	10.72
4	Colorado Mammoth – x	18	9	9	.500	5.0	7–2	2–7	190	208	−18	10.56	11.56
5	Saskatchewan Rush	18	8	10	.444	6.0	5–4	3–6	204	212	−8	11.33	11.78
6	Las Vegas Desert Dogs	18	5	13	.278	9.0	4–5	1–8	179	222	−43	9.94	12.33
7	Vancouver Warriors	18	4	14	.222	10.0	2–7	2–7	188	247	−59	10.44	13.72

== Game log ==
Game	Date	Opponent	Location	Score	OT	Attendance	Record
1	December 3, 2022	Albany FireWolves	KeyBank Center	L 10–11		11,493	0–1
2	December 17, 2022	@ Toronto Rock	FirstOntario Centre	W 11–8		7,730	1–1
3	December 30, 2022	Halifax Thunderbirds	KeyBank Center	W 18–13		14,040	2–1
4	January 7, 2023	@ Georgia Swarm	Gas South Arena	W 18–9		8,304	3–1
5	January 14, 2023	Georgia Swarm	KeyBank Center	W 11–9		14,189	4–1
6	January 20, 2023	@ Rochester Knighthawks	Blue Cross Arena	L 12–15		6,948	4–2
7	January 27, 2023	@ Philadelphia Wings	Wells Fargo Center	W 13–9		7,768	5–2
8	January 28, 2023	@ New York Riptide	Nassau Coliseum	W 16–10		4,990	6–2
9	February 4, 2023	Rochester Knighthawks	KeyBank Center	W 13–10		14,923	7–2
10	February 18, 2023	Philadelphia Wings	KeyBank Center	W 13–12	OT	14,632	8–2
11	March 3, 2023	@ Halifax Thunderbirds	Scotiabank Centre	W 10–9		6,724	9–2
12	March 10, 2023	Halifax Thunderbirds	KeyBank Center	W 10–9	OT	14,896	10–2
13	March 18, 2023	Colorado Mammoth	KeyBank Center	L 8–13		15,496	10–3
14	March 25, 2023	@ San Diego Seals	Pechanga Arena	W 7–6	OT	4,388	11–3
15	April 1, 2023	@ Toronto Rock	FirstOntario Centre	L 7–18		13,127	11–4
16	April 15, 2023	New York Riptide	KeyBank Center	W 11–10	OT	16,051	12–4
17	April 22, 2023	Toronto Rock	KeyBank Center	W 11–10		16,861	13–4
18	April 29, 2023	@ Albany FireWolves	Times Union Center	W 16–10		3,558	14–4

=== Playoffs ===
Game	Date	Opponent	Location	Score	OT	Attendance	Record
Eastern Conference Quarterfinals	May 6, 2023	Rochester Knighthawks	KeyBank Center	W 20–8		14,794	1–0
Eastern Conference Finals (Game 1)	May 12, 2023	Toronto Rock	KeyBank Center	W 14–5		11,510	2–0
Eastern Conference Finals (Game 2)	May 13, 2023	@ Toronto Rock	FirstOntario Centre	W 17–8		8,304	3–0
NLL Finals (Game 1)	May 27, 2023	Colorado Mammoth	KeyBank Center	W 13–12		14,260	4–0
NLL Finals (Game 2)	May 29, 2023	@ Colorado Mammoth	Ball Arena	L 10–16		10,686	4–1
NLL Finals (Game 3)	June 3, 2023	Colorado Mammoth	KeyBank Center	W 13–4		18,296	5–1

== Roster ==
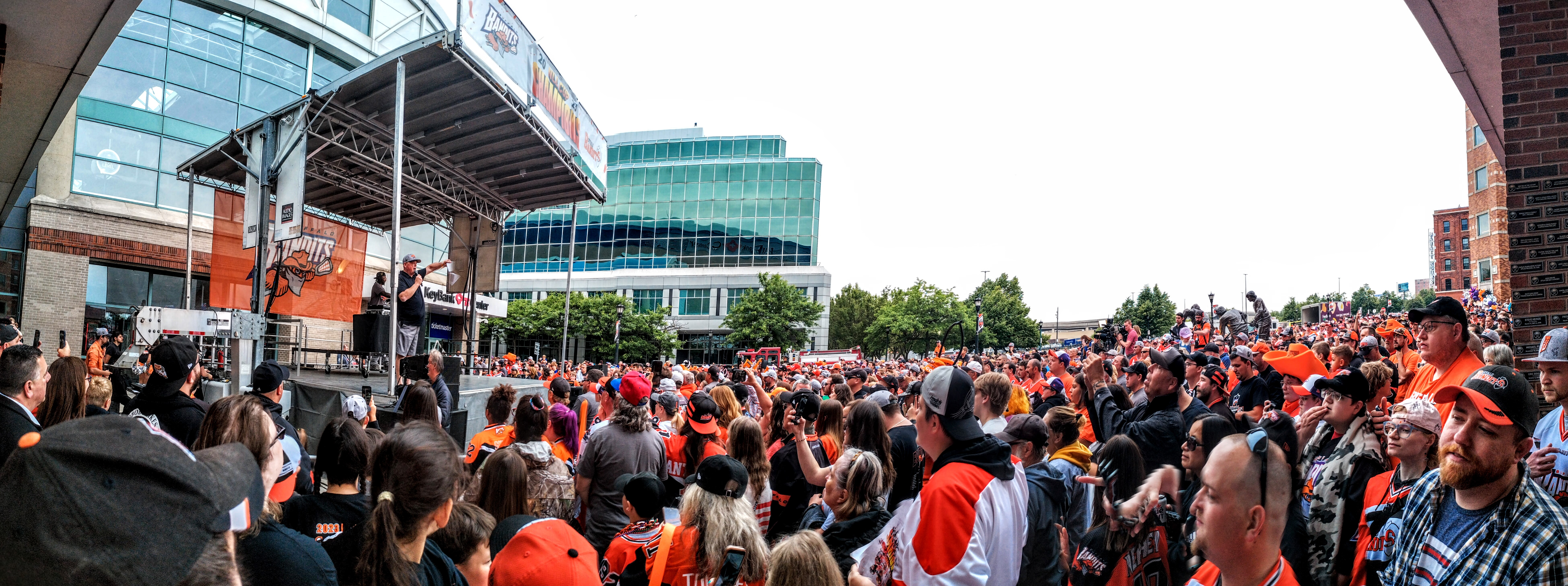
Public address announcer Chris Swenson leads the championship rally for Bandits on June 15, 2023

Buffalo Bandits roster
Active (21-man) roster		Inactive roster	Coaches
Goaltenders: 30 (Canada) Devlin Shanahan; 48 (Canada) Matt Vinc; Defensemen: 8 (Canada) Dylan Robinson; 15 (Canada) Adam Bomberry; 21 (Canada) Justin Martin; 23 (Canada) Steve Priolo (C); 25 (Canada) Matt Spanger; 37 (Canada) Ethan O'Connor; 53 (Canada) Justin Robinson; 94 (Canada) Bryce Sweeting	Forwards: 1 (Haudenosaunee) Tehoka Nanticoke; 2 (Canada) Chris Cloutier; 10 (Canada) Brad McCulley; 12 (Canada) Sam La Roue; 22 (Canada) Josh Byrne; 73 (Canada) Brandon Robinson; 91 (Canada) Kyle Buchanan; 92 (Canada) Dhane Smith (A); 95 (Canada) Chase Fraser; Transition: 4 (Canada) Ian MacKay; 6 (United States) Max Adler; 20 (Canada) Nick Weiss (A); 27 (United States) Dalton Sulver	Practice squad: 29 (Canada) Carter McKenzie; 44 (Canada) Nathaniel Kozevnikov; 70 (Canada) Joel Tayler; Holdout: (Canada) Alec Tulett; 5 (Canada) Devyn Mayea; 57 (Canada) Doug Buchan; 64 (Canada) Greg Harnett; Protected list: (United States) Justin Guterding; Unable to play: 83 (Haudenosaunee) Frank Brown	Head coach: John Tavares; Assistant coaches: Steve Dietrich; Anthony Cosmo; Eric Vinc; Equipment Manager: Ted Cordingley; Legend: * Suspended list; (C) Captain; (A) Alternate captain; Roster updated 2022-02-11; NLL Transactions

=== Entry Draft ===
The 2022 NLL Entry Draft took place on September 10, 2022. The Bandits made the following selections:

Round	Overall	Player	College/Club
1	13	Cam Wyers	Toronto Beaches – Loyola University
1	14	Dylan Robinson	Toronto Beaches
1	19	Zach Belter	Niagara Thunderhawks – St. Bonaventure
4	73	Ryan Sharkey	UCBLL Rapids – Canisius College/UMass
5	82	Christian Watts	UCBLL Rapids – Siena College
5	88	Austin Blumbergs	UCBLL Rapids – St. Bonaventure University

== Player stats ==
= Indicates team leader

= Indicates league leader

=== Runners (Top 10) ===
Player	GP	G	A	Pts	LB	PIM
Dhane Smith	18	36	96	132	99	6
Josh Byrne	18	43	50	93	66	12
Kyle Buchanan	18	21	37	58	97	2
Tehoka Nanticoke	13	21	18	39	31	26
Ian MacKay	18	19	19	38	121	14
Chris Cloutier	9	17	19	36	46	8
Brad McCulley	15	11	19	30	26	23
Brandon Robinson	10	13	8	21	31	9
Nick Weiss	18	6	14	20	117	14
Steve Priolo	17	3	16	19	143	70
Totals		215	336	551	1,260	302

=== Goaltenders ===
Player	GP	MIN	W	L	GA	Sv%	GAA
Matt Vinc	18	1,047:52	14	4	182	.803	10.42
Devlin Shanahan	18	39:10	0	0	9	.750	13.79
Totals		1,087:02	14	4	191	.801	10.54
