= 2023 New York Riptide season =

NLL season

2023 New York Riptide
- League: NLL
- Division: East
- 2023 record: 5–13
- Home record: 3–6
- Road record: 2–7
- Goals for: 201
- Goals against: 243
- General Manager: Jim Veltman
- Coach: Dan Ladouceur
- Captain: Dan MacRae
- Arena: Nassau Coliseum
- Average attendance: 4,611

The New York Riptide are a lacrosse team based in Uniondale, New York playing in the National Lacrosse League (NLL). The 2023 season is the team's 3rd season in the league.

== Regular season ==
=== Current standings ===
East Conference
| P | Team | GP | W | L | PCT | GB | Home | Road | GF | GA | Diff | GF/GP | GA/GP |
|---|---|---|---|---|---|---|---|---|---|---|---|---|---|
| 1 | Buffalo Bandits – xyz | 18 | 14 | 4 | .778 | 0.0 | 7–2 | 7–2 | 215 | 191 | +24 | 11.94 | 10.61 |
| 2 | Toronto Rock – x | 18 | 13 | 5 | .722 | 1.0 | 8–1 | 5–4 | 234 | 164 | +70 | 13.00 | 9.11 |
| 3 | Halifax Thunderbirds – x | 18 | 10 | 8 | .556 | 4.0 | 5–4 | 5–4 | 238 | 210 | +28 | 13.22 | 11.67 |
| 4 | Rochester Knighthawks – x | 18 | 10 | 8 | .556 | 4.0 | 6–3 | 4–5 | 218 | 214 | +4 | 12.11 | 11.89 |
| 5 | Philadelphia Wings | 18 | 9 | 9 | .500 | 5.0 | 4–5 | 5–4 | 200 | 211 | −11 | 11.11 | 11.72 |
| 6 | Georgia Swarm | 18 | 8 | 10 | .444 | 6.0 | 3–6 | 5–4 | 219 | 207 | +12 | 12.17 | 11.50 |
| 7 | New York Riptide | 18 | 5 | 13 | .278 | 9.0 | 3–6 | 2–7 | 201 | 243 | −42 | 11.17 | 13.50 |
| 8 | Albany FireWolves | 18 | 3 | 15 | .167 | 11.0 | 0–9 | 3–6 | 167 | 233 | −66 | 9.28 | 12.94 |

West Conference
| P | Team | GP | W | L | PCT | GB | Home | Road | GF | GA | Diff | GF/GP | GA/GP |
|---|---|---|---|---|---|---|---|---|---|---|---|---|---|
| 1 | San Diego Seals – xy | 18 | 14 | 4 | .778 | 0.0 | 7–2 | 7–2 | 240 | 193 | +47 | 13.33 | 10.72 |
| 2 | Calgary Roughnecks – x | 18 | 13 | 5 | .722 | 1.0 | 7–2 | 6–3 | 218 | 167 | +51 | 12.11 | 9.28 |
| 3 | Panther City Lacrosse Club – x | 18 | 10 | 8 | .556 | 4.0 | 6–3 | 4–5 | 204 | 193 | +11 | 11.33 | 10.72 |
| 4 | Colorado Mammoth – x | 18 | 9 | 9 | .500 | 5.0 | 7–2 | 2–7 | 190 | 208 | −18 | 10.56 | 11.56 |
| 5 | Saskatchewan Rush | 18 | 8 | 10 | .444 | 6.0 | 5–4 | 3–6 | 204 | 212 | −8 | 11.33 | 11.78 |
| 6 | Las Vegas Desert Dogs | 18 | 5 | 13 | .278 | 9.0 | 4–5 | 1–8 | 179 | 222 | −43 | 9.94 | 12.33 |
| 7 | Vancouver Warriors | 18 | 4 | 14 | .222 | 10.0 | 2–7 | 2–7 | 188 | 247 | −59 | 10.44 | 13.72 |

== Game log ==
| Game | Date | Opponent | Location | Score | OT | Attendance | Record |
|---|---|---|---|---|---|---|---|
| 1 | December 3, 2022 | San Diego Seals | Nassau Coliseum | L 14–15 | | 5,028 | 0–1 |
| 2 | December 17, 2022 | Halifax Thunderbirds | Nassau Coliseum | L 11–20 | | 3,896 | 0–2 |
| 3 | January 7, 2023 | Toronto Rock | Nassau Coliseum | L 7–15 | | 4,138 | 0–3 |
| 4 | January 15, 2023 | Rochester Knighthawks | Nassau Coliseum | L 8–11 | | 3,190 | 0–4 |
| 5 | January 21, 2023 | @ Albany FireWolves | MVP Arena | W 16–10 | | 3,642 | 1–4 |
| 6 | January 28, 2023 | Buffalo Bandits | Nassau Coliseum | L 10–16 | | 4,990 | 1–5 |
| 7 | February 4, 2023 | @ Toronto Rock | FirstOntario Centre | L 14–22 | | 9,419 | 1–6 |
| 8 | February 11, 2023 | Albany FireWolves | Nassau Coliseum | W 14–12 | | 4,738 | 2–6 |
| 9 | February 19, 2023 | @ Halifax Thunderbirds | Scotiabank Centre | L 12–13 | | 7,783 | 2–7 |
| 10 | February 25, 2023 | @ Rochester Knighthawks | Blue Cross Arena | L 10–11 | | 4,767 | 2–8 |
| 11 | March 4, 2023 | @ Philadelphia Wings | Wells Fargo Center (Philadelphia) | L 12–19 | | 9,329 | 2–9 |
| 12 | March 11, 2023 | Philadelphia Wings | Nassau Coliseum | W 13–10 | | 5,102 | 3–9 |
| 13 | March 18, 2023 | Albany FireWolves | Nassau Coliseum | W 13–10 | | 4,512 | 4–9 |
| 14 | March 25, 2023 | Georgia Swarm | Nassau Coliseum | L 8–13 | | 5,907 | 4–10 |
| 15 | March 31, 2023 | @ Georgia Swarm | Gas South Arena | L 7–12 | | 9,276 | 4–11 |
| 16 | April 15, 2023 | @ Buffalo Bandits | KeyBank Center | L 10–11 | OT | 16,051 | 4–12 |
| 17 | April 22, 2023 | @ Halifax Thunderbirds | Scotiabank Centre | L 6–15 | | 10,008 | 4–13 |
| 18 | April 29, 2023 | @ Vancouver Warriors | Rogers Arena | W 16–8 | | 9,508 | 5–13 |

== Roster ==
New York Riptide roster
| Active (21-man) roster | | Inactive roster | Coaches |
|---|---|---|---|
| Goaltenders: 12 (United States) Gowah Abrams; 27 (Canada) Alex Buque; Defensemen: 3 (Canada) Dan MacRae (C); 5 (United States) Mike Manley; 11 (Canada) Andrew Suitor; 14 (Haudenosaunee) Tyson Bomberry; 31 (United States) John Ranagan (A); 44 (Canada) Ethan Schott; 88 (Canada) Scott Johnston | Forwards: 1 (United States) Connor Kelly; 4 (Canada) Dan Lomas; 6 (United States) Kieran McArdle; 8 (Haudenosaunee) Travis Longboat; 18 (Israel) Jean Luc-Chetner; 19 (Canada) Tyson Gibson; 41 (Canada) Pat Saunders; 71 (United States) Gale Thorpe; 97 (Canada) John Wagner; Transition: 9 (United States) Alex Woodall; 57 (United States) Cody Radziewicz; 81 (Canada) Ryan Fournier | Practice squad: 15 (United States) Myles Jones; 25 (United States) Connor Farrell; 45 (Haudenosaunee) Jake Fox; Injured reserve: (United States) Jack Rowlett; (Haudenosaunee) Angus Goodleaf; Holdout: (Canada) Dawson Theede | Head coach: Regy Thorpe; Assistant coaches: Marshall Abrams; Joe Smith; Legend: * Suspended list; (C) Captain; (A) Alternate captain; updated 2020-02-15; NLL Transactions |

=== Entry Draft ===
The 2022 NLL Entry Draft took place on September 10, 2022. The Riptide made the following selections:

| Round | Overall | Player | College/Club |
|---|---|---|---|
| 1 | 8 | Zack Deaken | Brooklin Lacrosse Club – Jacksonville University |
| 2 | 27 | Mason Kamminga | Six Nations Chiefs – Detroit Mercy |
| 2 | 42 | Tyler Davis | Six Nations Jr A |
| 3 | 50 | Chris Gray | University of North Carolina* |
| 4 | 72 | Ryan Haigh | Cobourg Kodiaks – Cleveland State University |
| 5 | 78 | Zachary Sunderland | Brooklin LC – Newberry College |
| 5 | 83 | Sam Handley | UPenn |
| 6 | 93 | Andrew Horsley | Brampton |
