= 2023 Toronto Rock season =

2023 Toronto Rock
- League: NLL
- Division: East
- 2023 record: 13-5
- Home record: 8-1
- Road record: 5-4
- Goals for: 234
- Goals against: 164
- General Manager: Jamie Dawick
- Coach: Matt Sawyer
- Captain: Challen Rogers
- Alternate captains: Rob Hellyer; Bill Hostrawser; Brad Kri; Tom Schreiber
- Arena: FirstOntario Centre
- Average attendance: 9,423

The Toronto Rock are a lacrosse team based in Hamilton, Ontario playing in the National Lacrosse League (NLL). The 2023 season is the 25th in franchise history, and 24th as the Rock.

== Regular season ==
=== Final standings ===
East Conference
P	Team	GP	W	L	PCT	GB	Home	Road	GF	GA	Diff	GF/GP	GA/GP
1	Buffalo Bandits – xyz	18	14	4	.778	0.0	7–2	7–2	215	191	+24	11.94	10.61
2	Toronto Rock – x	18	13	5	.722	1.0	8–1	5–4	234	164	+70	13.00	9.11
3	Halifax Thunderbirds – x	18	10	8	.556	4.0	5–4	5–4	238	210	+28	13.22	11.67
4	Rochester Knighthawks – x	18	10	8	.556	4.0	6–3	4–5	218	214	+4	12.11	11.89
5	Philadelphia Wings	18	9	9	.500	5.0	4–5	5–4	200	211	−11	11.11	11.72
6	Georgia Swarm	18	8	10	.444	6.0	3–6	5–4	219	207	+12	12.17	11.50
7	New York Riptide	18	5	13	.278	9.0	3–6	2–7	201	243	−42	11.17	13.50
8	Albany FireWolves	18	3	15	.167	11.0	0–9	3–6	167	233	−66	9.28	12.94

West Conference
P	Team	GP	W	L	PCT	GB	Home	Road	GF	GA	Diff	GF/GP	GA/GP
1	San Diego Seals – xy	18	14	4	.778	0.0	7–2	7–2	240	193	+47	13.33	10.72
2	Calgary Roughnecks – x	18	13	5	.722	1.0	7–2	6–3	218	167	+51	12.11	9.28
3	Panther City Lacrosse Club – x	18	10	8	.556	4.0	6–3	4–5	204	193	+11	11.33	10.72
4	Colorado Mammoth – x	18	9	9	.500	5.0	7–2	2–7	190	208	−18	10.56	11.56
5	Saskatchewan Rush	18	8	10	.444	6.0	5–4	3–6	204	212	−8	11.33	11.78
6	Las Vegas Desert Dogs	18	5	13	.278	9.0	4–5	1–8	179	222	−43	9.94	12.33
7	Vancouver Warriors	18	4	14	.222	10.0	2–7	2–7	188	247	−59	10.44	13.72

== Game log ==
=== Regular season ===
Game	Date	Opponent	Location	Score	OT	Attendance	Record
1	December 3, 2022	Vancouver Warriors	FirstOntario Centre	W 19–8		7,344	1–0
2	December 10, 2022	@ Rochester Knighthawks	Blue Cross Arena	L 7–11		4,157	1–1
3	December 17, 2022	Buffalo Bandits	FirstOntario Centre	L 8–11		7,730	1–2
4	January 7, 2023	@ New York Riptide	Nassau Live Center	W 15–7		4,138	2–2
5	January 14, 2023	Halifax Thunderbirds	FirstOntario Centre	W 17–8		9,304	3–2
6	January 21, 2023	@ Philadelphia Wings	Wells Fargo Center	W 14–5		7,330	4–2
7	January 28, 2023	@ Calgary Roughnecks	Scotiabank Saddledome	W 11–10	OT	9,037	5–2
8	February 4, 2023	New York Riptide	FirstOntario Centre	W 22–14		9,419	6–2
9	February 10, 2023	@ Georgia Swarm	Gas South Arena	W 11–10		8,544	7–2
10	February 18, 2023	Georgia Swarm	FirstOntario Centre	W 16–7		8,912	8–2
11	March 4, 2023	Rochester Knighthawks	FirstOntario Centre	W 9–8		10,229	9–2
12	March 6, 2023	@ Philadelphia Wings	Wells Fargo Center	L 10–11		6,180	9–3
13	March 11, 2023	Albany FireWolves	FirstOntario Centre	W 12–9		8,421	10–3
14	March 18, 2023	@ Halifax Thunderbirds	Scotiabank Centre	L 12–14		9,957	10–4
15	March 25, 2023	@ Albany FireWolves	MVP Arena	W 11–9		3,849	11–4
16	April 1, 2023	Buffalo Bandits	FirstOntario Centre	W 17–8		13,127	12–4
17	April 15, 2023	Philadelphia Wings	FirstOntario Centre	W 12–7		10,320	13–4
18	April 22, 2023	@ Buffalo Bandits	KeyBank Center	L 10–11		16,861	13–5

=== Playoffs ===
Game	Date	Opponent	Location	Score	OT	Attendance	Record
Eastern Conference Quarterfinals	May 5, 2023	Halifax Thunderbirds	FirstOntario Centre	W 15–11		8,831	1–0
Eastern Conference finals (game 1)	May 12, 2023	@ Buffalo Bandits	KeyBank Center	L 5–14		11,510	1–1
Eastern Conference finals (game 2)	May 13, 2023	Buffalo Bandits	FirstOntario Centre	L 8–17		8,304	1–2

== Roster ==
Toronto Rock roster
Active (21-man) roster		Inactive roster	Coaches
Goaltenders: 1 (Canada) Riley Hutchcraft; 66 (Canada) Nick Rose; Defensemen: 71 (Canada) Sheldon Burns; 21 (Canada) Mitch de Snoo; 42 (Canada) Jamison Dilks; 45 (Canada) Damon Edwards; 93 (Canada) Latrell Harris; 91 (Canada) Billy Hostrawser (A); 3 (United States) T. D. Ierlan; 33 (Canada) Josh Jubenville; 20 (Canada) Bradley Kri (A); 22 (Canada) Jason Noble; 61 (Canada) Brandon Slade (D)	Forwards: 25 (Canada) Dan Craig; 6 (Canada) Dan Dawson; 10 (Canada) Rob Hellyer (A); 2 (Canada) Zach Manns; 97 (Canada) Reid Reinholdt; 19 (Canada) Justin Scott; 26 (United States) Tom Schreiber (A); Transition: 14 (Canada) Phil Mazzuca; 23 (Canada) Challen Rogers (C)	Practice squad: 17 (Canada) Aaron Forster (F); 92 (Canada) Troy Holowchuk (G); Injured reserve: 47 (Canada) Adam Jay (D); 55 (Canada) Chris Weier (D); Holdout: 51 (Canada) Jordan McKenna (D)	Head coach: Matt Sawyer; Assistant coaches: Bruce Codd; Blaine Manning; Brandon Miller; Legend: * Suspended list; (C) Captain; (A) Alternate captain; Roster updated 2022-3-1; NLL Transactions

=== Entry Draft ===
The 2022 NLL Entry Draft took place on September 10, 2022. The Toronto Rock made the following selections:

Round	Overall	Player	College/Club
2	28	Josh Dawick	Whitby Jr A – University of Denver
2	35	Tyler Hendrycks	Peterborough Jr A – High Point University
2	36	Brian Cameron	Rutgers University
2	41	Sam Haines	Oakville Buzz Jr A
3	56	Tucker Dordevic	Syracuse
4	71	Marley Angus	Oakville Jr A – Rochester Institute of Technology
5	87	Brendan Nichtern	Army
6	102	Brett Makar	University of Maryland
