= Shawn Williams (lacrosse) =

Canadian lacrosse player and executive (born 1974)

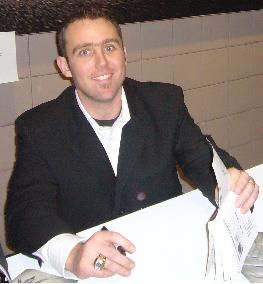

Personal information
- Nickname: Willie
- Born: June 20, 1974 (age 52) Scarborough, Ontario, Canada
- Height: 5 ft 11 in (180 cm)
- Weight: 200 lb (91 kg; 14 st 4 lb)

Sport
- Position: Forward
- Shoots: Left
- NLL teams: Edmonton Rush; Rochester Knighthawks; Buffalo Bandits; Toronto Rock; Ontario Raiders
- MLL teams: Hamilton Nationals
- MSL team: Brooklin Redmen
- Pro career: 1998–2014

Shawn Williams (born June 20, 1974) is the inaugural General Manager and Head Coach of the Las Vegas Desert Dogs in the National Lacrosse League (NLL). He is a former Canadian lacrosse player who played for the Ontario Raiders, Toronto Rock, Buffalo Bandits, Rochester Knighthawks and Edmonton Rush of the NLL and the Hamilton Nationals of Major League Lacrosse. He was also previously a scout for the Buffalo Bandits and assistant coach with the Colorado Mammoth. He was inducted to the NLL Hall of Fame in 2021 as a first ballot nominee.

== NLL career ==
Williams started his NLL career in 1998 with the Ontario Raiders. The Raiders moved to Toronto the next year, becoming the Toronto Rock. Following the 1999 season, Williams was traded to the Buffalo Bandits for a draft pick, and played two seasons in Buffalo. On May 18, 2001, Williams was traded again, this time to the Rochester Knighthawks as part of a seven player blockbuster deal.

Williams played his best season in 2004. When Knighthawk star John Grant, Jr. went down with a season-ending knee injury, Williams picked up the slack, finishing 8th in the league in points with 81, 3rd in goals with 45, and was named to the first All-Pro team. He was named Overall Player of the Week three times — all in the last four weeks of the season — and Offensive Player of the Week five times.

Williams has played in six NLL All-Star games, in 2002, 2005, 2006, 2007, 2008, and 2009 scoring the overtime winning goal in the 2008 game.

After ten seasons in Rochester, Williams was traded in October 2011 along with Aaron Bold to the Edmonton Rush for Ryan Cousins, Alex Kedoh Hill, and Andy Secore.

Williams was traded from Edmonton to Minnesota for two second-round picks in the 2013 NLL Entry Draft. Minnesota then sent him to Buffalo with Brendon Doran, a 2012 first-round pick, and two 2012 second-round picks for the third overall pick in 2012.

== MSL / WLA Career ==
Williams has been a member of the Brooklin Redmen of the MSL since 1996, other than 2003, when he played one year in the WLA for the Coquitlam Adanacs. He was a member of the Mann Cup-winning Redmen in 2000. He has won the Bucko McDonald Memorial Trophy as the top scorer in the MSL three times, in 1999, 2001 (co-winner with Josh Sanderson), and again in 2004. Williams also holds the MSL record for most points in a game — 21, set on July 26, 1999, against the Ohsweken Wolves.

== Field lacrosse ==
Williams is also an accomplished field lacrosse player, and has been a member of Team Canada at the last two World Lacrosse Championships. He also served as the coach for Brock University. On June 9, 2009, Williams was inducted into the Brock Badgers Hall of Fame.

== Statistics ==
=== NLL ===
Shawn Williams		Regular season									Playoffs								
Season	Team	GP	G	A	Pts	LB	PIM	Pts/GP	LB/GP	PIM/GP	GP	G	A	Pts	LB	PIM	Pts/GP	LB/GP	PIM/GP
1998	Ontario Raiders	12	15	21	36	38	12	3.00	3.17	1.00	–	–	–	–	–	–	–	–	–
1999	Toronto Rock	11	5	11	16	26	15	1.45	2.36	1.36	2	1	1	2	6	0	1.00	3.00	0.00
2000	Buffalo Bandits	10	21	19	40	68	4	4.00	6.80	0.40	1	0	0	0	6	0	0.00	6.00	0.00
2001	Buffalo Bandits	14	46	31	77	100	0	5.50	7.14	0.00	–	–	–	–	–	–	–	–	–
2002	Rochester Knighthawks	16	40	35	75	68	4	4.69	4.25	0.25	2	1	5	6	8	0	3.00	4.00	0.00
2003	Rochester Knighthawks	16	27	45	72	83	4	4.50	5.19	0.25	2	3	4	7	9	0	3.50	4.50	0.00
2004	Rochester Knighthawks	16	45	36	81	91	24	5.06	5.69	1.50	1	1	2	3	4	2	3.00	4.00	2.00
2005	Rochester Knighthawks	16	33	50	83	74	12	5.19	4.63	0.75	2	5	2	7	7	0	3.50	3.50	0.00
2006	Rochester Knighthawks	16	31	49	80	68	14	5.00	4.25	0.88	2	3	3	6	5	0	3.00	2.50	0.00
2007	Rochester Knighthawks	16	36	55	91	69	8	5.69	4.31	0.50	3	6	13	19	18	2	6.33	6.00	0.67
2008	Rochester Knighthawks	16	25	55	80	64	2	5.00	4.00	0.13	–	–	–	–	–	–	–	–	–
2009	Rochester Knighthawks	16	26	67	93	85	4	5.81	5.31	0.25	1	1	5	6	2	0	6.00	2.00	0.00
2010	Rochester Knighthawks	16	23	46	69	76	4	4.31	4.75	0.25	–	–	–	–	–	–	–	–	–
2011	Rochester Knighthawks	16	23	54	77	64	2	4.81	4.00	0.13	1	1	3	4	5	0	4.00	5.00	0.00
2012	Edmonton Rush	16	16	52	68	41	8	4.25	2.56	0.50	3	2	11	13	7	4	4.33	2.33	1.33
2013	Buffalo Bandits	16	19	46	65	42	6	4.06	2.63	0.38	–	–	–	–	–	–	–	–	–
2014	Buffalo Bandits	18	13	36	49	44	8	2.72	2.44	0.44	3	1	4	5	7	2	1.67	2.33	0.67
		257	444	708	1,152	1,101	131	4.48	4.28	0.51	23	25	53	78	84	10	3.39	3.65	0.43
Career Total:		280	469	761	1,230	1,185	141	4.39	4.23	0.50									

GP–Games played; G–Goals; A–Assists; Pts–Points; LB–Loose balls; PIM–Penalty minutes; Pts/GP–Points per games played; LB/GP–Loose balls per games played; PIM/GP–Penalty minutes per games played.

=== NLL head coaching statistics ===
Team	Season	Regular Season				Playoffs				Playoff result
Team	Season	GC	W	L	W%	GC	W	L	W%	Playoff result
Las Vegas Desert Dogs	2023	18	5	13	.278	–	–	–	–	Did not qualify
Las Vegas Desert Dogs	2024	18	5	13	.278	–	–	–	–	Did not qualify
Las Vegas Desert Dogs	2025	18	4	14	.222	–	–	–	–	Did not qualify
Las Vegas Desert Dogs	2026	18	8	10	.444	–	–	–	–	Did not qualify
Totals:	4	72	22	50	.306	–	–	–	–	

=== Canadian Lacrosse Association ===
			Regular Season					Playoffs
Season	Team	League	GP	G	A	Pts	PIM	GP	G	A	Pts	PIM
1990	Scarborough	OLA Jr B	14	6	10	16	8	--	--	--	--	--
1991	Scarborough	OLA Jr B	18	70	25	95	55	11	22	15	37	47
1992	Scarborough	OLA Jr B	18	79	44	123	40	12	28	24	52	18
1992	Brampton	OLA Jr A	1	2	0	2	0	--	--	--	--	--
1993	Scarborough	OLA Jr A	19	47	45	92	18	--	--	--	--	--
1994	Scarborough	OLA Jr A	22	62	67	129	66	--	--	--	--	--
1994	Owen Sound	MSL	6	7	10	17	9	--	--	--	--	--
1995	Brampton	OLA Jr A	20	45	33	78	14	3	4	9	13	10
1996	Brooklin	MSL	19	34	15	49	13	5	4	8	12	6
1997	Brooklin	MSL	20	25	30	55	10	4	4	7	11	2
1998	Brooklin	MSL	18	33	37	70	13	5	5	11	16	0
1999	Brooklin	MSL	16	41	49	90	6	10	15	15	30	10
2000	Brooklin	MSL	18	45	51	96	17	15	29	18	47	12
2001	Brooklin	MSL	18	57	36	93	2	10	27	28	55	10
2002	Brooklin	MSL	10	27	28	55	4	10	17	19	36	4
2003	Coquitlam	WLA	14	24	32	56	6	10	11	23	34	17
2004	Brooklin	MSL	18	46	78	124	11	4	10	17	27	4
2005	Brooklin	MSL	16	33	51	84	10	--	--	--	--	--
Junior A Totals			--	--	--	--	--	--	--	--	--	--
Junior B Totals			--	--	--	--	--	--	--	--	--	--
Senior A Totals			--	--	--	--	--	--	--	--	--	--

Preceded by Dan Dawson	NLL Sportsmanship Award; 2010	Succeeded by Jordan Hall
