= 2023 NLL Stadium Showdown =

Outdoor lacrosse game

- Promotional material for the event
San Diego Seals	Las Vegas Desert Dogs
15	12
- Dates: March 4, 2023
- Venue: Snapdragon Stadium, San Diego, California
- Attendance: 8,443

Live Broadcast
- Broadcast(s): ESPN+ (United States); TSN.ca (Canada); KSWB-TV (San Diego)

The 2023 NLL Stadium Showdown was a professional outdoor box lacrosse game that was held on March 4, 2023, at Snapdragon Stadium in San Diego, between the San Diego Seals and the Las Vegas Desert Dogs. It was played on an improvised box around the end zone of the typical American football field. It was the first outdoor game in National Lacrosse League history. The game coincided with an NCAA Division I women's lacrosse tournament.

== Game summary ==
March 4, 2023	San Diego Seals	15–12	Las Vegas Desert Dogs	Snapdragon Stadium	Recap

Scoring summary
Period	Team	Goal	Assist(s)	Time	Score
1st	LV	Jon Phillips (16)	Jack Hannah (17) and Rob Hellyer (40)	01:43	1–0 LV
1st	LV	Reid Reinholdt (6)	Unassisted	04:35	2–0 LV
1st	SD	Mac O'Keefe (10)	Wesley Berg (33) and Curtis Dickson (26)	05:52	2–1 LV
1st	SD	Curtis Dickson (25)	Kevin Crowley (18)	06:56	2–2
1st	SD	Casey Jackson (5) – pp	Curtis Dickson (27) and Tre Leclaire (5)	09:17	3–2 SD
1st	SD	Dane Dobbie (28) – pp	Kevin Crowley (19) and Wesley Berg (34)	10:06	4–2 SD
1st	LV	Charlie Bertrand (11)	Rob Hellyer (41) and Garrett McIntosh (2)	11:03	4–3 SD
1st	LV	Charlie Bertrand (12)	Zack Greer (12) and Rob Hellyer (42)	12:08	4–4
2nd	LV	Connor Kirst (5)	Jacob Ruest (15)	00:27	5–4 LV
2nd	SD	Tre Leclaire (6)	Brodie Merrill (6)	03:27	5–5
2nd	LV	Charlie Bertrand (13)	Unassisted	03:59	6–5 LV
2nd	SD	Dane Dobbie (29) – pp	Wesley Berg (35) and Casey Jackson (5)	05:50	6–6
2nd	SD	Tre Leclaire (7)	Danny Logan (2)	06:17	7–6 SD
2nd	SD	Curtis Dickson (26) – sh	Austin Staats (18) and Cameron Holding (4)	13:15	8–6 SD
2nd	LV	Jack Hannah (19) – pp	Rob Hellyer (43)	13:46	8–7 SD
3rd	LV	Jack Hannah (20) – pp	Zack Greer (13) and Marshal King (2)	00:55	8–8
3rd	SD	Austin Staats (12)	Curtis Dickson (28)	02:55	9–8 SD
3rd	LV	Zack Greer (19)	Jon Phillips (15) and Marshal King (3)	07:31	9–9
3rd	LV	Marshal King (2)	Jack Hannah (18) and Zack Greer (14)	11:12	10–9 LV
3rd	SD	Dane Dobbie (30)	Curtis Dickson (29) and Eli Gobrecht (5)	13:01	10–10
3rd	SD	Wesley Berg (15)	Curtis Dickson (30) and Austin Staats (19)	14:23	11–10 SD
4th	LV	Wesley Berg (16)	Curtis Dickson (31)	00:57	12–10 SD
4th	SD	Casey Jackson (6) – pp	Austin Staats (19) and Dane Dobbie (23)	03:36	13–10 SD
4th	SD	Casey Jackson (7) – pp	Wesley Berg (15) and Austin Staats (20)	07:17	14–10 SD
4th	LV	Zack Greer (20)	Jack Hannah (19) and Charlie Bertrand (18)	09:41	14–11 SD
4th	LV	Rob Hellyer (13)	Reid Reinholdt (6) and Landon Kells (3)	11:04	14–12
4th	SD	Curtis Dickson (27)	Austin Staats (30) and Brodie Merrill (7)	12:15	15–12 SD
Penalty summary
Period	Team	Player	Penalty	Time	PIM
1st	LV	Garrett McIntosh	Roughing	08:15	2:00
1st	LV	Reid Reinholdt	Illegal cross-checking	09:50	2:00
1st	LV	Tor Reinholdt	Dead ball foul	14:24	2:00
1st	SD	Jesse Gamble	Headbutting – major	14:24	5:00
2nd	LV	Connor Kirst	Holding	05:36	2:00
2nd	SD	Jesse Gamble	Illegal cross-checking	06:36	2:00
2nd	LV	Zack Greer	Holding	09:24	2:00
2nd	SD	Bench	Illegal substitution	11:58	2:00
2nd	SD	Dane Dobbie	Holding the stick	14:40	2:00
3rd	None				
4th	LV	Griffin Hall	Hooking	03:00	2:00
4th	LV	Connor Kirst	Illegal cross-checking	05:51	2:00
4th	SD	Drew Belgrave	Holding the stick	12:50	2:00
4th	LV	Zack Greer	Holding	14:50	2:00

Power play opportunities
Team	Goals/Opportunities
San Diego	5/7
Las Vegas	2/4
