= Las Vegas Desert Dogs =

American box lacrosse team

- Sport: Lacrosse
- Founded: 2021
- League: National Lacrosse League
- Location: Henderson, Nevada
- Arena: Lee's Family Forum
- Owners: Joseph Tsai; Wayne Gretzky; Steve Nash; Dustin Johnson
- Head coach: Shawn Williams
- General manager: Shawn Williams
- Website: lasvegasdesertdogs.com

The Las Vegas Desert Dogs are an American professional box lacrosse team based in the Las Vegas metropolitan area that competes in the National Lacrosse League (NLL). The team plays its home games at Lee's Family Forum. The team began play in the 2023 NLL season.

== History ==
On June 21, 2021, the NLL awarded an expansion franchise to the city of Las Vegas and co-owners Joseph Tsai, Wayne Gretzky, Steve Nash and Dustin Johnson. The team began play in the 2022–2023 season beginning in winter 2022 at Michelob Ultra Arena. Tsai is the owner of the San Diego Seals and has received special permission from the NLL to own multiple teams. Shawn Williams, one of the most accomplished players in NLL history, has been selected to lead the Las Vegas Desert Dogs as the franchise’s first general manager and head coach.

== Roster ==
Las Vegas Desert Dogs roster
| Active (21-man) roster | | Inactive roster | Coaches |
|---|---|---|---|
| Goaltenders: 42 (Canada) Landon Kells; 92 (Canada) Joel Watson; Defensemen: 25 (Canada) James Barclay; 90 (Canada) Travis Cornwall; 12 (Canada) Nick Ellerton; 3 (Canada) Garrett McIntosh; 7 (Canada) Tor Reinholdt; 13 (England) Tyson Roe; 37 (Canada) Jackson Suboch; 77 (Canada) John Wagner | Forwards: 61 (United States) Charlie Bertrand; 19 (Canada) Holden Cattoni; 88 (Canada) Zack Greer; 33 (United States) Jack Hannah; 10 (Canada) Rob Hellyer; 9 (Canada) Marshal King; 97 (Canada) Reid Reinholdt; 20 (Canada) Jacob Ruest; Transition: 63 (Canada) Brandon Clelland; 34 (United States) Connor Kirst; 41 (Canada) Erik Turner | Practice squad: 27 (Canada) Emerson Clark (D); 6 (Canada) Griffin Hall (D); 17 (Canada) Jon Phillips (F); 8 (United States) Joe Robertson (F); Injured reserve: 2 (Canada) Conrad Chapman (T) | Head coach Shawn Williams Legend: * Suspended list; (C) Captain; (A) Alternate captain; NLL Transactions |

== All-time record ==
| Season | Conference | W–L | Finish | Home | Road | GF | GA | Coach | Playoffs |
|---|---|---|---|---|---|---|---|---|---|
| 2023 | Western | 5–13 | 6th | 4–5 | 1–8 | 179 | 222 | Shawn Williams | Did not qualify |
| 2024 | Unified | 5–13 | 14th | 2–7 | 3–6 | 176 | 223 | Shawn Williams | Did not qualify |
| 2025 | Unified | 4–14 | 14th | 2–7 | 2–7 | 189 | 256 | Shawn Williams | Did not qualify |
| 2026 | Unified | 8–10 | 9th | 6–3 | 2–7 | 219 | 229 | Shawn Williams | Did not qualify |
| Total | 4 Seasons | 22–50 | | 14–22 | 8–28 | 663 | 930 | | |
| Playoff totals | 0 Appearances | 0–0 | | 0–0 | 0–0 | 0 | 0 | 0 Championships | |

== Draft history ==
=== NLL Entry Draft ===
First Round Selections

- 2022: Dylan Watson (2nd overall), Jake Saunders (16th overall)
- 2023: Adam Poitras (2nd overall)
- 2024: None
- 2025: Casey Wilson (4th overall), Caleb Khan (17th overall)

== Award winners ==
| Year | Player | Award |
|---|---|---|
| 2023 | Mark Fine | Executive of the Year |
| 2024 | Zack Greer | Teammate of the Year |

== Head coaching history ==
| # | Name | Term | Regular Season | | | | Playoffs | | | |
| # | Name | Term | GC | W | L | W% | GC | W | L | W% |
|---|---|---|---|---|---|---|---|---|---|---|
| 1 | Shawn Williams | 2023- | 72 | 22 | 50 | .306 | - | - | - | - |
