= 2014 Buffalo Bandits season =

Lacrosse team season

2014 Buffalo Bandits
- League: NLL
- Division: 3rd East
- 2014 record: 8–10
- Home record: 6–3
- Road record: 2–7
- Goals for: 190
- Goals against: 200
- General Manager: Steve Dietrich
- Coach: Troy Cordingley
- Captain: John Tavares
- Alternate captains: Scott Self; Shawn Williams
- Arena: First Niagara Center

Team leaders
- Goals: Mark Steenhuis (31)
- Assists: Ryan Benesch (53)
- Points: Ryan Benesch (78)
- Penalties in minutes: Steve Priolo (65)
- Loose Balls: Jay Thorimbert (191)
- Wins: Anthony Cosmo (8)
- Goals against average: Anthony Cosmo (10.77)

The Buffalo Bandits are a lacrosse team based in Buffalo, New York playing in the National Lacrosse League (NLL). The 2014 season was their twenty-third season in the NLL.

After finishing last in the East and missing the playoffs in 2013, the Bandits fired head coach Darris Kilgour and hired his former assistant coach Troy Cordingley, recently fired by the Toronto Rock despite winning the Les Bartley Award.

The Bandits started the 2014 season strong. After losing their first game, the Bandits won their next five and eight of their next nine, looking much stronger than the 2013 Bandits, who missed the playoffs. But the Bandits seemed to return to their 2013 form after that, losing their last eight straight, collapsing to 3rd in the division. But the losing streak ended in the playoffs, as they took out the Toronto Rock in Toronto in the division semi-finals. In the division finals, the Bandits won game one of the two-game series against Rochester. However, the Knighthawks came back to win game two and the resulting mini-game to take the division and end the Bandits' season. The Knighthawks would go on to win the NLL Championship, their third straight.

== Standings ==
East Division
P	Team	GP	W	L	PCT	GB	Home	Road	GF	GA	Diff	GF/GP	GA/GP
1	Rochester Knighthawks – xy	18	14	4	.778	0.0	8–1	6–3	210	167	+43	11.67	9.28
2	Toronto Rock – x	18	9	9	.500	5.0	6–3	3–6	219	213	+6	12.17	11.83
3	Buffalo Bandits – x	18	8	10	.444	6.0	6–3	2–7	190	200	−10	10.56	11.11
4	Philadelphia Wings	18	6	12	.333	8.0	2–7	4–5	202	218	−16	11.22	12.11
5	Minnesota Swarm	18	4	14	.222	10.0	2–7	2–7	180	219	−39	10.00	12.17

West Division
P	Team	GP	W	L	PCT	GB	Home	Road	GF	GA	Diff	GF/GP	GA/GP
1	Edmonton Rush – xyz	18	16	2	.889	0.0	8–1	8–1	220	157	+63	12.22	8.72
2	Calgary Roughnecks – x	18	12	6	.667	4.0	6–3	6–3	237	215	+22	13.17	11.94
3	Colorado Mammoth – x	18	8	10	.444	8.0	4–5	4–5	201	228	−27	11.17	12.67
4	Vancouver Stealth	18	4	14	.222	12.0	3–6	1–8	181	223	−42	10.06	12.39

x: Clinched playoff berth; c: Clinched playoff berth by crossing over to another division; y: Clinched division; z: Clinched best regular season record; GP: Games Played
W: Wins; L: Losses; GB: Games back; PCT: Win percentage; Home: Record at Home; Road: Record on the Road; GF: Goals scored; GA: Goals allowed
Differential: Difference between goals scored and allowed; GF/GP: Average number of goals scored per game; GA/GP: Average number of goals allowed per game

=== Game log ===
Game	Date	Opponent	Location	Score	OT	Attendance	Record
1	December 28, 2013	Philadelphia Wings	First Niagara Center	L 13–17		16,347	0–1
2	January 10, 2014	Toronto Rock	First Niagara Center	W 12–10		11,404	1–1
3	January 12, 2014	@ Philadelphia Wings	Wells Fargo Center (Philadelphia)	W 12–11	OT	7,365	2–1
4	January 18, 2014	@ Colorado Mammoth	Pepsi Center	W 16–9		14,822	3–1
5	January 25, 2014	Rochester Knighthawks	First Niagara Center	W 11–10		13,339	4–1
6	February 1, 2014	Toronto Rock	First Niagara Center	W 12–10		12,768	5–1
7	February 8, 2014	@ Rochester Knighthawks	Blue Cross Arena	L 6–9		9,280	5–2
8	February 15, 2014	Philadelphia Wings	First Niagara Center	W 13–7		13,980	6–2
9	March 8, 2014	Minnesota Swarm	First Niagara Center	W 12–9		15,330	7–2
10	March 15, 2014	Colorado Mammoth	First Niagara Center	W 12–9		15,445	8–2
11	March 21, 2014	@ Edmonton Rush	Rexall Place	L 5–14		7,071	8–3
12	March 23, 2014	@ Minnesota Swarm	Xcel Energy Center	L 9–10	OT	6,081	8–4
13	March 29, 2014	@ Vancouver Stealth	Langley Events Centre	L 8–12		3,197	8–5
14	April 5, 2014	Calgary Roughnecks	First Niagara Center	L 13–16		16,606	8–6
15	April 12, 2014	@ Minnesota Swarm	Xcel Energy Center	L 9–10		7,088	8–7
16	April 18, 2014	@ Toronto Rock	Air Canada Centre	L 9–13		11,276	8–8
17	April 19, 2014	@ Rochester Knighthawks	Blue Cross Arena	L 4–8		8,900	8–9
18	April 26, 2014	Rochester Knighthawks	First Niagara Center	L 14–16		19,070	8–10

=== Playoffs ===
New to the 2014 season, the Conference Finals and Championship will expand to a two-game series from the previous single-game elimination setup. The top seed from each division will play the winner of the Division Semifinal game between the second and third seeds, with the lower-seeded team hosting the first game and the higher seed hosting the second game of the series. A team which wins both games will win the two-game series. In the event of a series split with both teams winning one game, a 10-minute tiebreaker game will be played immediately following the conclusion of the second contest to determine the winner of the playoff series. If the teams are still tied after 10 minutes, they would play sudden-death overtime. The Championship would be decided by a similar two-game series.

=== Game log ===
Game	Date	Opponent	Location	Score	OT	Attendance	Record
Division Semifinal	May 3, 2014	@ Toronto Rock	Air Canada Centre	W 15–13		7,867	1–0
Eastern Final Game 1	May 10, 2014	Rochester Knighthawks	First Niagara Center	W 12–8		9,209	2–0
Eastern Final Game 2	May 17, 2014	@ Rochester Knighthawks	Blue Cross Arena	L 8–13		8,651	2–1
Eastern Final Game 3 (10 min game)	May 17, 2014	@ Rochester Knighthawks	Blue Cross Arena	L 1–2	OT	–	2–2

== Roster ==
2014 Buffalo Bandits roster
Active (21-man) roster		Inactive roster	Coaches
Goaltenders: 44 (Canada) Anthony Cosmo; 38 (Canada) Kurtis Wagar; Defensemen: 27 (Canada) Glen Bryan; 23 (Canada) Steve Priolo; 3 (Canada) Billy Dee Smith; 42 (Canada) Rory Smith; 6 (Canada) Derek Suddons	Forwards: 17 (Canada) Ryan Benesch; 19 (Canada) Chad Culp; 5 (United States) Joe Resetarits; 90 (Canada) Jamie Rooney; 9 (Canada) Mark Steenhuis; 11 (Canada) John Tavares (C); 51 (Canada) Shawn Williams (A); 10 (Canada) Aaron Wilson; Transition: 13 (Canada) David Brock; 8 (Canada) Kevin Brownell; 92 (Canada) Dhane Smith; 75 (Canada) Jay Thorimbert; 22 (Canada) Andrew Watt	Practice squad: 74 (Canada) Colin Boucher; 91 (Canada) Jordan Critch; 97 (Canada) Hayden Smith; 55 (Canada) Mitch Wilde; Holdout: 66 (Haudenosaunee) Alex Kedoh Hill; 14 (Canada) Joe Smith; 93 (Canada) Scott Stewart; Unable to play: 40 (Canada) Joel Matthews	Head coach {{{Head Coach}}} Legend: * Suspended list; (C) Captain; (A) Alternate captain; Roster updated 2013-3-16; NLL Transactions

== Player stats ==
=== Runners (Top 10) ===
Player	GP	G	A	Pts	LB	PIM
Ryan Benesch	18	25	53	78	88	10
Mark Steenhuis	18	31	32	63	108	21
Dhane Smith	18	20	39	59	79	9
John Tavares	16	24	27	51	78	31
Shawn Williams	18	13	36	49	44	8
Joe Resetarits	17	25	17	42	65	2
Steve Priolo	18	8	18	26	99	65
Jamie Rooney	11	8	13	21	32	4
Aaron Wilson	8	8	5	13	30	9
Chad Culp	17	7	4	11	59	28
Totals		190	296	486	1,274	329

=== Goaltenders ===
Player	GP	MIN	W	L	GA	Sv%	GAA
Kurtis Wagar	18	25:05	0	1	4	.800	9.57
Anthony Cosmo	18	1,063:36	8	9	191	.797	10.77
Totals		1,088:41	8	10	195	.798	10.75

== Transactions ==
=== Trades ===
July 15, 2013	To Buffalo Bandits Ryan Benesch; Andrew Watt	To Minnesota Swarm 1st round pick, 2015 entry draft 1st round pick, 2016 entry draft 3rd round pick, 2017 entry draft
July 30, 2013	To Buffalo Bandits Rory Smith; 4th round pick, 2015 entry draft	To Colorado Mammoth Carter Bender second round pick, 2013 entry draft second round pick, 2014 entry draft
September 14, 2013	To Buffalo Bandits Two 2nd round picks, 2014 entry draft	To Philadelphia Wings Luke Wiles

=== Entry Draft ===
The 2013 NLL Entry Draft took place on September 16, 2013. The Bandits made the following selections:

Round	Overall	Player	College/Club
2	14	Nick Diachenko	University of Delaware
2	15	Mitch Wilde	Robert Morris University
5	38	Eric Penney	St. Catharines, Ontario
6	47	Kevin Pym	Okotoks, Alberta
6	53	Dylan Goddard	Clarington, Ontario

== See also ==
- 2014 NLL season
