= 2014 Calgary Roughnecks season =

2014 Calgary Roughnecks
- West Division Champions
- League: NLL
- Division: 2nd West
- 2014 record: 12 - 6
- Home record: 6 - 3
- Road record: 6 - 3
- Goals for: 237
- Goals against: 215
- General Manager: Mike Board
- Coach: Curt Malawsky
- Captain: Andrew McBride
- Arena: Scotiabank Saddledome

Team leaders
- Goals: Dane Dobbie (51)
- Assists: Shawn Evans (79)
- Points: Shawn Evans (105)
- Penalties in minutes: Geoff Snider (45)
- Loose Balls: Geoff Snider (209)
- Wins: Mike Poulin (12)
- Goals against average: Mike Poulin (11.45)

The Calgary Roughnecks are a lacrosse team based in Calgary playing in the National Lacrosse League (NLL). The 2014 season was the 13th in franchise history.

== Regular season ==
=== Final standings ===
East Division
P	Team	GP	W	L	PCT	GB	Home	Road	GF	GA	Diff	GF/GP	GA/GP
1	Rochester Knighthawks – xy	18	14	4	.778	0.0	8–1	6–3	210	167	+43	11.67	9.28
2	Toronto Rock – x	18	9	9	.500	5.0	6–3	3–6	219	213	+6	12.17	11.83
3	Buffalo Bandits – x	18	8	10	.444	6.0	6–3	2–7	190	200	−10	10.56	11.11
4	Philadelphia Wings	18	6	12	.333	8.0	2–7	4–5	202	218	−16	11.22	12.11
5	Minnesota Swarm	18	4	14	.222	10.0	2–7	2–7	180	219	−39	10.00	12.17

West Division
P	Team	GP	W	L	PCT	GB	Home	Road	GF	GA	Diff	GF/GP	GA/GP
1	Edmonton Rush – xyz	18	16	2	.889	0.0	8–1	8–1	220	157	+63	12.22	8.72
2	Calgary Roughnecks – x	18	12	6	.667	4.0	6–3	6–3	237	215	+22	13.17	11.94
3	Colorado Mammoth – x	18	8	10	.444	8.0	4–5	4–5	201	228	−27	11.17	12.67
4	Vancouver Stealth	18	4	14	.222	12.0	3–6	1–8	181	223	−42	10.06	12.39

x: Clinched playoff berth; c: Clinched playoff berth by crossing over to another division; y: Clinched division; z: Clinched best regular season record; GP: Games Played
W: Wins; L: Losses; GB: Games back; PCT: Win percentage; Home: Record at Home; Road: Record on the Road; GF: Goals scored; GA: Goals allowed
Differential: Difference between goals scored and allowed; GF/GP: Average number of goals scored per game; GA/GP: Average number of goals allowed per game

== Game log ==
=== Regular season ===
Game	Date	Opponent	Location	Score	OT	Attendance	Record
1	January 3, 2014	@ Toronto Rock	Air Canada Centre	L 11–16		11,120	0–1
2	January 10, 2014	Colorado Mammoth	Scotiabank Saddledome	W 13–11		11,232	1–1
3	January 17, 2014	@ Edmonton Rush	Rexall Place	L 8–15		7,184	1–2
4	January 18, 2014	Vancouver Stealth	Scotiabank Saddledome	W 15–12		8,957	2–2
5	January 25, 2014	Colorado Mammoth	Scotiabank Saddledome	L 13–14	OT	9,121	2–3
6	February 8, 2014	@ Minnesota Swarm	Xcel Energy Center	W 15–13		8,468	3–3
7	February 15, 2014	Vancouver Stealth	Scotiabank Saddledome	W 20–9		11,162	4–3
8	February 22, 2014	Rochester Knighthawks	Scotiabank Saddledome	W 11–10		9,207	5–3
9	March 1, 2014	Toronto Rock	Scotiabank Saddledome	W 19–13		8,990	6–3
10	March 8, 2014	@ Colorado Mammoth	Pepsi Center	L 9–10	OT	17,044	6–4
11	March 14, 2014	Edmonton Rush	Scotiabank Saddledome	L 7–15		10,691	6–5
12	March 21, 2014	@ Vancouver Stealth	Langley Event Centre	W 13–8		3,629	7–5
13	March 29, 2014	Minnesota Swarm	Scotiabank Saddledome	W 15–11		11,008	8–5
14	April 4, 2014	@ Philadelphia Wings	Wells Fargo Center	W 13–9		6,659	9–5
15	April 5, 2014	@ Buffalo Bandits	First Niagara Center	W 16–13		16,606	10–5
16	April 12, 2014	Edmonton Rush	Scotiabank Saddledome	L 11–15		15,167	10–6
17	April 19, 2014	@ Edmonton Rush	Rexall Place	W 14–13	OT	8,756	11–6
18	April 26, 2014	@ Vancouver Stealth	Langley Event Centre	W 14–8		3,443	12–6

=== Playoffs ===
Game	Date	Opponent	Location	Score	OT	Attendance	Record
Division Semifinal	May 3, 2014	Colorado Mammoth	Scotiabank Saddledome	W 16–15	OT	12,375	1–0
Division Final (Game 1)	May 10, 2014	Edmonton Rush	Scotiabank Saddledome	W 12–11	OT	13,618	2–0
Division Final (Game 2)	May 16, 2014	@ Edmonton Rush	Rexall Place	L 13–15		9,120	2–1
Division Final (Game 3)	May 16, 2014	@ Edmonton Rush	Rexall Place	W 2–1		9,120	3–1
Finals; Game 1	May 24, 2014	Rochester Knighthawks	Scotiabank Saddledome	W 10–7		16,541	4–1
Finals; Game 2	May 31, 2014	@ Rochester Knighthawks	Blue Cross Arena	L 10–16		9,188	4–2
Finals; Game 3*	May 31, 2014	@ Rochester Knighthawks	Blue Cross Arena	L 2–3		9,188	4–3

== Roster ==
2014 Calgary Roughnecks roster
Active (21-man) roster		Inactive roster	Coaches
Goaltenders: 35 (Canada) Peter Dubenski; 30 (Canada) Mike Poulin; 92 (Canada) Frankie Scigliano; Defensemen: 16 (Canada) Mike Carnegie (A); 33 (Canada) Jon Harnett; 57 (Canada) Cody Hawkins; 3 (Canada) Dan MacRae; 10 (Canada) Curtis Manning; 37 (Canada) Andrew McBride (C); 6 (Canada) Garrett McIntosh	Forwards: 17 (Canada) Curtis Dickson; 61 (Canada) Matthew Dinsdale; 44 (Canada) Dane Dobbie; 15 (Canada) Shawn Evans; 11 (Canada) Greg Harnett; 71 (Canada) Scott Ranger; 77 (Canada) Jeff Shattler; 36 (Canada) Daryl Veltman; Transition: 21 (Canada) Karsen Leung; 7 (Canada) Tor Reinholdt; 4 (Canada) Geoff Snider	Practice squad: -- (Canada) Brett Baron; 48 (Canada) Jake Hayes; 6 (Canada) Barclay Hickey; Injured reserve: 22 (Canada) Scott Carnegie; Unable to play: 20 (Canada) Travis Cornwall; 80 (Canada) Peter McFetridge	Head coach {{{Head Coach}}} Legend: * Suspended list; (C) Captain; (A) Alternate captain; Roster updated 2012-01-09; NLL Transactions

== See also ==
- 2014 NLL season
