= 2014 Rochester Knighthawks season =

2014 Rochester Knighthawks
- Champion's Cup Champions
- East Division Champions
- League: NLL
- Division: 1st East
- 2014 record: 14 - 4
- Home record: 8 - 1
- Road record: 6 - 3
- Goals for: 210
- Goals against: 167
- General Manager: Curt Styres
- Coach: Mike Hasen
- Captain: Sid Smith
- Alternate captains: Mike Accursi; Mike Kirk
- Arena: Blue Cross Arena

Team leaders
- Goals: Cody Jamieson (36)
- Assists: Cody Jamieson (72)
- Points: Cody Jamieson (108)
- Penalties in minutes: Mac Allen (39)
- Loose Balls: Brad Self (131)
- Wins: Matt Vinc (12)
- Goals against average: Angus Goodleaf (7.08)

The Rochester Knighthawks were a lacrosse team based in Rochester, New York, that played in the National Lacrosse League (NLL). The 2014 season was the 20th in franchise history. The Knighthawks won their third consecutive Champion's Cup becoming the first team in NLL history to win three straight league championships. Dan Dawson was the Most Valuable Player of the Champion's Cup Finals.

The feat of three consecutive championships in the NLL would be accomplished for a second time by the Buffalo Bandits in 2025. Much like with Rochester, goaltender Matt Vinc would also be a part of all three championships with the Bandits.

== Regular season ==
=== Current standings ===
East Division
P	Team	GP	W	L	PCT	GB	Home	Road	GF	GA	Diff	GF/GP	GA/GP
1	Rochester Knighthawks – xy	18	14	4	.778	0.0	8–1	6–3	210	167	+43	11.67	9.28
2	Toronto Rock – x	18	9	9	.500	5.0	6–3	3–6	219	213	+6	12.17	11.83
3	Buffalo Bandits – x	18	8	10	.444	6.0	6–3	2–7	190	200	−10	10.56	11.11
4	Philadelphia Wings	18	6	12	.333	8.0	2–7	4–5	202	218	−16	11.22	12.11
5	Minnesota Swarm	18	4	14	.222	10.0	2–7	2–7	180	219	−39	10.00	12.17

West Division
P	Team	GP	W	L	PCT	GB	Home	Road	GF	GA	Diff	GF/GP	GA/GP
1	Edmonton Rush – xyz	18	16	2	.889	0.0	8–1	8–1	220	157	+63	12.22	8.72
2	Calgary Roughnecks – x	18	12	6	.667	4.0	6–3	6–3	237	215	+22	13.17	11.94
3	Colorado Mammoth – x	18	8	10	.444	8.0	4–5	4–5	201	228	−27	11.17	12.67
4	Vancouver Stealth	18	4	14	.222	12.0	3–6	1–8	181	223	−42	10.06	12.39

x: Clinched playoff berth; c: Clinched playoff berth by crossing over to another division; y: Clinched division; z: Clinched best regular season record; GP: Games Played
W: Wins; L: Losses; GB: Games back; PCT: Win percentage; Home: Record at Home; Road: Record on the Road; GF: Goals scored; GA: Goals allowed
Differential: Difference between goals scored and allowed; GF/GP: Average number of goals scored per game; GA/GP: Average number of goals allowed per game

== Game log ==
Game	Date	Opponent	Location	Score	OT	Attendance	Record
1	December 28, 2013	Minnesota Swarm	Blue Cross Arena	W 8–6		6,238	1–0
2	January 11, 2014	Philadelphia Wings	Blue Cross Arena	W 13–9		6,488	2–0
3	January 18, 2014	Toronto Rock	Blue Cross Arena	W 12–8		8,136	3–0
4	January 25, 2014	@ Buffalo Bandits	First Niagara Center	L 10–11		13,339	3–1
5	February 1, 2014	@ Edmonton Rush	Rexall Place	L 7–8	OT	7,951	3–2
6	February 8, 2014	Buffalo Bandits	Blue Cross Arena	W 9–6		9,280	4–2
7	February 15, 2014	@ Toronto Rock	Air Canada Centre	W 17–9		10,279	5–2
8	February 22, 2014	@ Calgary Roughnecks	Scotiabank Saddledome	L 10–11		9,207	5–3
9	March 1, 2014	@ Colorado Mammoth	Pepsi Center	W 11–9		15,212	6–3
10	March 8, 2014	Philadelphia Wings	Blue Cross Arena	W 13–8		8,560	7–3
11	March 15, 2014	@ Toronto Rock	Air Canada Centre	W 17–12		10,832	8–3
12	March 16, 2014	@ Philadelphia Wings	Wells Fargo Center	W 11–7		7,894	9–3
13	March 29, 2014	Edmonton Rush	Blue Cross Arena	L 11–15		8,632	9–4
14	April 4, 2014	@ Minnesota Swarm	Xcel Energy Center	W 15–14	OT	6,430	10–4
15	April 5, 2014	Minnesota Swarm	Blue Cross Arena	W 12–9		6,410	11–4
16	April 12, 2014	Vancouver Stealth	Blue Cross Arena	W 10–7		6,248	12–4
17	April 19, 2014	Buffalo Bandits	Blue Cross Arena	W 8–4		8,900	13–4
18	April 26, 2014	@ Buffalo Bandits	First Niagara Center	W 16–14		19,070	14–4

== Playoffs ==
=== Game log ===
Game	Date	Opponent	Location	Score	OT	Attendance	Record
Division Finals Game 1	May 10, 2014	@ Buffalo Bandits	First Niagara Center	L 8–12		9,209	0–1
Division Finals Game 2	May 17, 2014	Buffalo Bandits	Blue Cross Arena	W 13–8		8,651	1–1
Division Finals Game 3*	May 17, 2014	Buffalo Bandits	Blue Cross Arena	W 2–1	OT	--	2–1
Finals; Game 1	May 24, 2014	@ Calgary Roughnecks	Scotiabank Saddledome	L 7–10		16,541	2–2
Finals; Game 2	May 31, 2014	Calgary Roughnecks	Blue Cross Arena	W 16–10		9,188	3–2
Finals; Game 3*	May 31, 2014	Calgary Roughnecks	Blue Cross Arena	W 3–2		--	4–2

* 10-minute series tiebreaker mini-game

== Roster ==
Rochester Knighthawks roster
Active (21-man) roster		Inactive roster	Coaches
Goaltenders: 66 (Haudenosaunee) Mike Thompson; 48 (Canada) Matt Vinc; Defensemen: 2 (Canada) Paul Dawson; 5 (Canada) Scott Self; 7 (Canada) Tyler Burton; 16 (Canada) Dylan Evans; 26 (Canada) Mike Kirk (A); 29 (Canada) Ian Llord; 37 (Canada) Scott Campbell; 75 (Canada) Mac Allen; 79 (Haudenosaunee) Sid Smith (C)	Forwards: 1 (United States) Joe Walters; 6 (Canada) Dan Dawson; 9 (Haudenosaunee) Craig Point; 23 (Canada) Cory Vitarelli; 28 (Canada) Stephen Keogh; 88 (Haudenosaunee) Cody Jamieson (A); 93 (Haudenosaunee) Johnny Powless; Transition: 25 (Canada) Brad Self; 10 (Canada) Joel McCready	Practice squad: 77 (Canada) Mark White; 91 (Canada) Chris Attwood; 94 (Haudenosaunee) Wenster Green; Injured reserve: 4 (Canada) Jamie Batson; Holdout: 57 (Canada) Jon Sullivan; 75 (Canada) Cody McLeod; 86 (Canada) Rory Glaves; Unable to play: 55 (Canada) Angus Goodleaf; (Canada) Zac Reid	Head coach {{{Head Coach}}} Legend: * Suspended list; (C) Captain; (A) Alternate captain; updated 2011-12-22; NLL Transactions

== See also ==
- 2014 NLL season
