= 2014 Minnesota Swarm season =

2014 Minnesota Swarm
- League: NLL
- Division: 5th East
- 2014 record: 4 - 14
- Home record: 2 - 7
- Road record: 2 - 7
- Goals for: 180
- Goals against: 219
- General Manager: Joe Sullivan
- Coach: Joe Sullivan
- Captain: Andrew Suitor
- Arena: Xcel Energy Center

Team leaders
- Goals: Logan Schuss (36)
- Assists: Callum Crawford (54)
- Points: Callum Crawford (80)
- Penalties in minutes: Andrew Suitor (73)
- Loose Balls: Jordan MacIntosh (204)
- Wins: Zach Higgins (2); Tyler Carlson (2)
- Goals against average: Tyler Carlson (11.32)

The 2014 Minnesota Swarm season was the tenth season of the Minnesota Swarm, a lacrosse team based in Saint Paul, Minnesota playing in the National Lacrosse League.

== Regular season ==
=== Current standings ===
East Division
P	Team	GP	W	L	PCT	GB	Home	Road	GF	GA	Diff	GF/GP	GA/GP
1	Rochester Knighthawks – xy	18	14	4	.778	0.0	8–1	6–3	210	167	+43	11.67	9.28
2	Toronto Rock – x	18	9	9	.500	5.0	6–3	3–6	219	213	+6	12.17	11.83
3	Buffalo Bandits – x	18	8	10	.444	6.0	6–3	2–7	190	200	−10	10.56	11.11
4	Philadelphia Wings	18	6	12	.333	8.0	2–7	4–5	202	218	−16	11.22	12.11
5	Minnesota Swarm	18	4	14	.222	10.0	2–7	2–7	180	219	−39	10.00	12.17

West Division
P	Team	GP	W	L	PCT	GB	Home	Road	GF	GA	Diff	GF/GP	GA/GP
1	Edmonton Rush – xyz	18	16	2	.889	0.0	8–1	8–1	220	157	+63	12.22	8.72
2	Calgary Roughnecks – x	18	12	6	.667	4.0	6–3	6–3	237	215	+22	13.17	11.94
3	Colorado Mammoth – x	18	8	10	.444	8.0	4–5	4–5	201	228	−27	11.17	12.67
4	Vancouver Stealth	18	4	14	.222	12.0	3–6	1–8	181	223	−42	10.06	12.39

x: Clinched playoff berth; c: Clinched playoff berth by crossing over to another division; y: Clinched division; z: Clinched best regular season record; GP: Games Played
W: Wins; L: Losses; GB: Games back; PCT: Win percentage; Home: Record at Home; Road: Record on the Road; GF: Goals scored; GA: Goals allowed
Differential: Difference between goals scored and allowed; GF/GP: Average number of goals scored per game; GA/GP: Average number of goals allowed per game

=== Game log ===
Game	Date	Opponent	Location	Score	OT	Attendance	Record
1	December 28, 2013	@ Rochester Knighthawks	Blue Cross Arena	L 6–8		6,238	0–1
2	January 11, 2014	@ Vancouver Stealth	Langley Event Centre	L 5–8		5,276	0–2
3	January 18, 2014	@ Philadelphia Wings	Wells Fargo Center (Philadelphia)	W 11–10		5,164	1–2
4	January 19, 2014	Philadelphia Wings	Xcel Energy Center	L 8–15		8,213	1–3
5	February 1, 2014	@ Colorado Mammoth	Pepsi Center	L 12–14		15,127	1–4
6	February 8, 2014	Calgary Roughnecks	Xcel Energy Center	L 13–15		8,468	1–5
7	February 15, 2014	Edmonton Rush	Xcel Energy Center	L 9–14		7,195	1–6
8	February 22, 2014	@ Toronto Rock	Air Canada Centre	L 12–14		9,207	1–7
9	February 23, 2014	@ Philadelphia Wings	Wells Fargo Center (Philadelphia)	W 15–14		6,458	2–7
10	March 8, 2014	@ Buffalo Bandits	First Niagara Center	L 9–12		15,330	2–8
11	March 16, 2014	Toronto Rock	Xcel Energy Center	L 8–9	OT	6,628	2–9
12	March 23, 2014	Buffalo Bandits	Xcel Energy Center	W 10–9	OT	6,081	3–9
13	March 29, 2014	@ Calgary Roughnecks	Scotiabank Saddledome	L 11–15		11,008	3–10
14	April 4, 2014	Rochester Knighthawks	Xcel Energy Center	L 14–15	OT	6,430	3–11
15	April 5, 2014	@ Rochester Knighthawks	Blue Cross Arena	L 9–12		6,410	3–12
16	April 12, 2014	Buffalo Bandits	Xcel Energy Center	W 10–9		7,088	4–12
17	April 19, 2014	Colorado Mammoth	Xcel Energy Center	L 12–18		7,961	4–13
18	April 26, 2014	Toronto Rock	Xcel Energy Center	L 6–8		9,056	4–14

== Roster ==
Minnesota Swarm roster
Active (21-man) roster		Inactive roster	Coaches
Goaltenders: 30 (Canada) Tyler Carlson; 31 (Canada) Zach Higgins; Defensemen: 10 (Canada) Alex Crepinsek; 8 (United States) Greg Downing; 4 (United States) Jeff Gilbert (A); 11 (Canada) Mike Hobbins; 15 (Canada) Jordan Houtby	Forwards: 98 (Canada) Callum Crawford (C); 81 (Canada) Josh Gillam; 32 (Canada) Shayne Jackson; 89 (Canada) Scott Jones; 18 (Canada) Logan Schuss; Transition: 33 (United States) David Earl; 12 (Canada) Cameron Flint; 9 (Canada) Tyler Hass; 24 (Canada) Jordan MacIntosh; 46 (Canada) Kiel Matisz; 45 (Canada) Jason Noble; 3 (Canada) Brock Sorensen; 20 (Canada) Andrew Suitor (C)	Practice squad: 23 (Canada) Dominique Alexander; 7 (Canada) Zach Palmer; 84 (Canada) Corbyn Tao	Head coach {{{Head Coach}}} Legend: * Suspended list; (C) Captain; (A) Alternate captain; updated 2013-04-21; NLL Transactions

== Transactions ==
=== Trades ===
July 15, 2013	To Minnesota Swarm 1st round pick, 2015 entry draft 1st round pick, 2016 entry draft 3rd round pick, 2017 entry draft	To Buffalo Bandits Ryan Benesch; Andrew Watt
September 13, 2013	To Minnesota Swarm 1st round pick, 2015 entry draft 1st round pick, 2017 entry draft	To Philadelphia Wings Evan Kirk

== See also ==
- 2014 NLL season
