= Alex Kedoh Hill =

Haudenosaunee lacrosse player (born 1990)

Personal information
- Nationality: Haudenosaunee
- Born: September 8, 1990 (age 36) Six Nations, Ontario, Canada
- Height: 5 ft 11 in (180 cm)
- Weight: 212 lb (96 kg; 15 st 2 lb)

Sport
- Position: Transition
- Shoots: Right
- NLL draft: 29th overall, 2010; Edmonton Rush
- {{{league}}} team Former teams: Buffalo Bandits; Rochester Knighthawks; Six Nations Chiefs; Edmonton Rush
- Pro career: 2011–2017

Alexander Kedoh Hill (born September 8, 1990) is a Haudenosaunee former professional box lacrosse player. Hailing from Six Nations of the Grand River, Hill began his career with the hometown Six Nations Arrows of the Ontario Junior A Lacrosse League, with whom he played from 2009 to 2011. Hill was eventually called up to the Six Nations Chiefs, and was a member of the 2013 and 2014 Mann Cup winning Chiefs club.

Initially drafted by Edmonton Rush in the 2010 NLL Entry Draft, Hill saw success in his first game, as he recorded two goals and two assists in a 10-7 loss to the Boston Blazers. He, along with Andy Secore and Ryan Cousins, was traded to the Rochester Knighthawks prior to the 2012 season, and spent time in and out of the lineup. At the 2013 trade deadline, Hill was traded to the Bandits for defenseman Scott Self. Currently, Hill is still playing for the Buffalo Bandits. In 2017, he finished with a career high 31 points in 20 games.
