= 2014 Edmonton Rush season =

2014 Edmonton Rush
- League: NLL
- Division: 1st West
- 2014 record: 16 - 2
- Home record: 8 - 1
- Road record: 8 - 1
- Goals for: 220
- Goals against: 157
- General Manager: Derek Keenan
- Coach: Derek Keenan
- Captain: Chris Corbeil
- Alternate captains: Jarrett Davis; Zack Greer; Brett Mydske; Kyle Rubisch
- Arena: Rexall Place

Team leaders
- Goals: Curtis Knight (35)
- Assists: Cory Conway (51)
- Points: Mark Matthews (78)
- Penalties in minutes: Nik Bilic (46)
- Loose Balls: Jeremy Thompson (165)
- Wins: Aaron Bold (15)
- Goals against average: Aaron Bold (8.73)

The Edmonton Rush are a lacrosse team based in Edmonton playing in the National Lacrosse League (NLL). The 2014 season is the 9th in franchise history. The Rush began the season with an NLL record 14 straight victories, clinching the western division title and the best record in the league before they lost their first game, a 10-8 decision to the Colorado Mammoth on April 11.

== Regular season ==
=== Current standings ===
East Division
P	Team	GP	W	L	PCT	GB	Home	Road	GF	GA	Diff	GF/GP	GA/GP
1	Rochester Knighthawks – xy	18	14	4	.778	0.0	8–1	6–3	210	167	+43	11.67	9.28
2	Toronto Rock – x	18	9	9	.500	5.0	6–3	3–6	219	213	+6	12.17	11.83
3	Buffalo Bandits – x	18	8	10	.444	6.0	6–3	2–7	190	200	−10	10.56	11.11
4	Philadelphia Wings	18	6	12	.333	8.0	2–7	4–5	202	218	−16	11.22	12.11
5	Minnesota Swarm	18	4	14	.222	10.0	2–7	2–7	180	219	−39	10.00	12.17

West Division
P	Team	GP	W	L	PCT	GB	Home	Road	GF	GA	Diff	GF/GP	GA/GP
1	Edmonton Rush – xyz	18	16	2	.889	0.0	8–1	8–1	220	157	+63	12.22	8.72
2	Calgary Roughnecks – x	18	12	6	.667	4.0	6–3	6–3	237	215	+22	13.17	11.94
3	Colorado Mammoth – x	18	8	10	.444	8.0	4–5	4–5	201	228	−27	11.17	12.67
4	Vancouver Stealth	18	4	14	.222	12.0	3–6	1–8	181	223	−42	10.06	12.39

x: Clinched playoff berth; c: Clinched playoff berth by crossing over to another division; y: Clinched division; z: Clinched best regular season record; GP: Games Played
W: Wins; L: Losses; GB: Games back; PCT: Win percentage; Home: Record at Home; Road: Record on the Road; GF: Goals scored; GA: Goals allowed
Differential: Difference between goals scored and allowed; GF/GP: Average number of goals scored per game; GA/GP: Average number of goals allowed per game

== Game log ==
=== Regular season ===
Game	Date	Opponent	Location	Score	OT	Attendance	Record
1	December 28, 2013	@ Colorado Mammoth	Pepsi Center	W 13–10		15,596	1–0
2	January 11, 2014	Colorado Mammoth	Rexall Place	W 17–6		7,950	2–0
3	January 17, 2014	Calgary Roughnecks	Rexall Place	W 15–8		7,184	3–0
4	January 25, 2014	@ Vancouver Stealth	Langley Event Centre	W 9–8		3,840	4–0
5	February 1, 2014	Rochester Knighthawks	Rexall Place	W 8–7	OT	7,951	5–0
6	February 8, 2014	@ Philadelphia Wings	Wells Fargo Center	W 8–6		7,194	6–0
7	February 15, 2014	@ Minnesota Swarm	Xcel Energy Center	W 14–9		7,195	7–0
8	February 28, 2014	Toronto Rock	Rexall Place	W 11–10		8,015	8–0
9	March 8, 2014	Vancouver Stealth	Rexall Place	W 10–9		7,898	9–0
10	March 14, 2014	@ Calgary Roughnecks	Scotiabank Saddledome	W 15–7		10,691	10–0
11	March 21, 2014	Buffalo Bandits	Rexall Place	W 14–5		7,071	11–0
12	March 29, 2014	@ Rochester Knighthawks	Blue Cross Arena	W 15–11		8,632	12–0
13	March 30, 2014	@ Toronto Rock	Air Canada Centre	W 13–10		10,655	13–0
14	April 5, 2014	Colorado Mammoth	Rexall Place	W 12–11		8,275	14–0
15	April 11, 2014	@ Colorado Mammoth	Pepsi Center	L 8–10		17,109	14–1
16	April 12, 2014	@ Calgary Roughnecks	Scotiabank Saddledome	W 15–11		15,167	15–1
17	April 19, 2014	Calgary Roughnecks	Rexall Place	L 13–14	OT	8,756	15–2
18	April 25, 2014	Vancouver Stealth	Rexall Place	W 10–5		7,500	16–2

=== Playoffs ===
Game	Date	Opponent	Location	Score	OT	Attendance	Record
Division Final (Game 1)	May 10, 2014	@ Calgary Roughnecks	Scotiabank Saddledome	L 11–12	OT	13,618	0–1
Division Final (Game 2)	May 16, 2014	Calgary Roughnecks	Rexall Place	W 15–13		9,120	1–1
Division Final (10-minute Mini-Game)	May 16, 2014	Calgary Roughnecks	Rexall Place	L 1–2		9,120	1–2

== Transactions ==
=== Trades ===
September 16, 2013	To Edmonton Rush Nik Bilic (D); 1st round pick in 2013 NLL Entry Draft - Robert Church (F); 4th round pick in 2013 NLL Entry Draft - Reid Mydske (D); 6th round pick in 2014 NLL Entry Draft - Mitch McAvoy (F)	To Minnesota Swarm 1st round pick in 2013 NLL Entry Draft - Cameron Flint (T); 5th round pick in 2013 NLL Entry Draft - JJ Laforet (D); 6th round pick in 2013 NLL Entry Draft - Nicholas Jonas (D); *4th round pick in 2014 NLL Entry Draft - Matt MacGrotty (D)
January 24, 2014	To Edmonton Rush 4th round pick in 2014 NLL Entry Draft - Matt MacGrotty (D)	To Minnesota Swarm Dane Stevens (F)

*Later traded back to the Edmonton Rush

=== Entry Draft ===
The 2013 NLL Entry Draft took place on September 16, 2013. The Rush made the following selections:

^{#} Denotes player who never played in the NLL regular season or playoffs

Round	Overall	Player	College/Club
1	5	Robert Church (F)	Drexel University
2	11	Riley Loewen (F)	Limestone College
2	13	Adrian Sorichetti (T)	Hofstra University
4	30	Reid Mydske^{#} (D)	New Westminster, British Columbia
6	51	Ben Snider^{#} (D)	Delta, British Columbia

== Roster ==
Edmonton Rush roster
Active (21-man) roster		Inactive roster	Coaches
Goaltenders: 77 (Canada) Aaron Bold; 50 (Canada) Brodie MacDonald; Defensemen: 79 (Canada) Nik Bilic; 16 (Canada) Chris Corbeil (C); 13 (Canada) Jeff Cornwall; 24 (Canada) Ryan Dilks; 6 (Canada) John Lintz; 2 (Canada) Brett Mydske (A); 4 (Canada) Kyle Rubisch (A)	Forwards: 17 (Canada) Robert Church; 91 (Canada) Cory Conway; 23 (Canada) Jarrett Davis (A); 88 (Canada) Zack Greer (A); 9 (Canada) Curtis Knight; 10 (Canada) Riley Loewen; 42 (Canada) Mark Matthews; 87 (Canada) Alex Turner; Transition: 33 (Canada) John LaFontaine; 72 (Canada) Adrian Sorichetti; 74 (Haudenosaunee) Jeremy Thompson	Practice squad: 20 (Canada) Mitch Banister; 61 (Canada) Mike Burke; -- (Canada) Tyler Burton; 3 (Canada) Jarrett Toll; Protected list: -- (Canada) Tyler Codron; Unable to play: 15 (Canada) Corey Small	Head coach {{{Head Coach}}} Legend: * Suspended list; (C) Captain; (A) Alternate captain; Roster updated 2012-01-08; NLL Transactions

== See also ==
- 2014 NLL season
