= 2014 Toronto Rock season =

2014 Toronto Rock
- League: NLL
- Division: 2nd East
- 2014 record: 9–9
- Home record: 6–3
- Road record: 3–6
- Goals for: 219
- Goals against: 213
- General Manager: Terry Sanderson
- Coach: John Lovell
- Captain: Colin Doyle
- Alternate captains: Sandy Chapman; Patrick Merrill; Josh Sanderson
- Arena: Air Canada Centre

Team leaders
- Goals: Stephan Leblanc (45)
- Assists: Garrett Billings (69)
- Points: Garrett Billings (101)
- Penalties in minutes: Billy Hostrawser (55)
- Loose Balls: Ethan O'Connor (133)
- Wins: Nick Rose (6)
- Goals against average: Brandon Miller (8.95)

The Toronto Rock are a lacrosse team based in Toronto playing in the National Lacrosse League (NLL). The 2014 season was the 17th in franchise history, and 16th as the Rock.

After an up-and-down start to the season, the Rock acquired goaltender Brandon Miller from the Philadelphia Wings at the trade deadline hoping to revitalize their shaky defense.

On April 5, star forward Garrett Billings tore his ACL during a game against the Vancouver Stealth and was lost for the remainder of the season. Despite losing the league's scoring leader, the Rock won that game, which started a four-game winning streak to finish the regular season and clinch second place in the Eastern division ahead of the slumping Buffalo Bandits. But the Bandits ended their 8-game losing streak by beating the Rock in the division semi-finals, 15–3.

== Regular season ==
=== Final standings ===
East Division
P	Team	GP	W	L	PCT	GB	Home	Road	GF	GA	Diff	GF/GP	GA/GP
1	Rochester Knighthawks – xy	18	14	4	.778	0.0	8–1	6–3	210	167	+43	11.67	9.28
2	Toronto Rock – x	18	9	9	.500	5.0	6–3	3–6	219	213	+6	12.17	11.83
3	Buffalo Bandits – x	18	8	10	.444	6.0	6–3	2–7	190	200	−10	10.56	11.11
4	Philadelphia Wings	18	6	12	.333	8.0	2–7	4–5	202	218	−16	11.22	12.11
5	Minnesota Swarm	18	4	14	.222	10.0	2–7	2–7	180	219	−39	10.00	12.17

West Division
P	Team	GP	W	L	PCT	GB	Home	Road	GF	GA	Diff	GF/GP	GA/GP
1	Edmonton Rush – xyz	18	16	2	.889	0.0	8–1	8–1	220	157	+63	12.22	8.72
2	Calgary Roughnecks – x	18	12	6	.667	4.0	6–3	6–3	237	215	+22	13.17	11.94
3	Colorado Mammoth – x	18	8	10	.444	8.0	4–5	4–5	201	228	−27	11.17	12.67
4	Vancouver Stealth	18	4	14	.222	12.0	3–6	1–8	181	223	−42	10.06	12.39

x: Clinched playoff berth; c: Clinched playoff berth by crossing over to another division; y: Clinched division; z: Clinched best regular season record; GP: Games Played
W: Wins; L: Losses; GB: Games back; PCT: Win percentage; Home: Record at Home; Road: Record on the Road; GF: Goals scored; GA: Goals allowed
Differential: Difference between goals scored and allowed; GF/GP: Average number of goals scored per game; GA/GP: Average number of goals allowed per game

== Game log ==
=== Regular season ===
Game	Date	Opponent	Location	Score	OT	Attendance	Record
1	January 3, 2014	Calgary Roughnecks	Air Canada Centre	W 16–11		11,120	1–0
2	January 10, 2014	@ Buffalo Bandits	First Niagara Center	L 10–12		11,404	1–1
3	January 18, 2014	@ Rochester Knighthawks	Blue Cross Arena	L 8–12		8,136	1–2
4	January 31, 2014	Vancouver Stealth	Air Canada Centre	W 17–12		11,234	2–2
5	February 1, 2014	@ Buffalo Bandits	First Niagara Center	L 10–12		12,768	2–3
6	February 7, 2014	Philadelphia Wings	Air Canada Centre	W 20–10		9,087	3–3
7	February 15, 2014	Rochester Knighthawks	Air Canada Centre	L 9–17		10,279	3–4
8	February 22, 2014	Minnesota Swarm	Air Canada Centre	W 14–12		9,207	4–4
9	February 28, 2014	@ Edmonton Rush	Rexall Centre	L 10–11		8,015	4–5
10	March 1, 2014	@ Calgary Roughnecks	Scotiabank Saddledome	L 13–19		8,990	4–6
11	March 15, 2014	Rochester Knighthawks	Air Canada Centre	L 12–17		10,832	4–7
12	March 16, 2014	@ Minnesota Swarm	Xcel Energy Center	W 9–8	OT	6,628	5–7
13	March 22, 2014	@ Philadelphia Wings	Wells Fargo Center	L 13–14		7,157	5–8
14	March 30, 2014	Edmonton Rush	Air Canada Centre	L 10–13		10,655	5–9
15	April 5, 2014	@ Vancouver Stealth	Langley Event Centre	W 17–9		3,721	6–9
16	April 12, 2014	Philadelphia Wings	Air Canada Centre	W 10–9		10,662	7–9
17	April 18, 2014	Buffalo Bandits	Air Canada Centre	W 13–9		11,276	8–9
18	April 26, 2014	@ Minnesota Swarm	Xcel Energy Center	W 8–6		9,056	9–9

=== Playoffs ===
Game	Date	Opponent	Location	Score	OT	Attendance	Record
Division Semifinal	May 3, 2014	Buffalo Bandits	Air Canada Centre	L 13–15		7,867	0–1

== Roster ==
Toronto Rock roster
Active (21-man) roster		Inactive roster	Coaches
Goaltenders: 35 (Canada) Brandon Miller; 66 (Canada) Nick Rose; Defensemen: 5 (Canada) Sandy Chapman (A); 45 (Canada) Damon Edwards; 21 (Canada) Bill Greer; 91 (Canada) Bill Hostrawser; 88 (Canada) Scott Johnston; 41 (Canada) Mike Lum-Walker; 14 (Canada) Rob Marshall; 9 (Canada) Patrick Merrill (A); 98 (Canada) Jimmy Purves	Forwards: 33 (Canada) Kasey Beirnes; 13 (Canada) Garrett Billings; 7 (Canada) Colin Doyle (C); 10 (Canada) Rob Hellyer; 17 (Canada) Stephan Leblanc; 71 (Canada) Kevin Ross; 19 (Canada) Josh Sanderson (A); Transition: 4 (Canada) Jesse Gamble; 37 (Canada) Ethan O'Connor	Practice squad: 77 (Canada) Craig England D; 39 (Canada) Steve Fryer G; 22 (Canada) Cam Woods D; Injured reserve: 8 (Canada) Nick Diachenko D; 12 (Canada) Chris White D; Holdout: 15 (United States) Eric Law F	Head coach {{{Head Coach}}} Legend: * Suspended list; (C) Captain; (A) Alternate captain; Roster updated 2014-3-25; NLL Transactions

== See also ==
- 2014 NLL season
