= 2014 Colorado Mammoth season =

2014 Colorado Mammoth
- League: NLL
- Division: 3rd West
- 2014 record: 8 - 10
- Home record: 4 - 5
- Road record: 4 - 5
- Goals for: 201
- Goals against: 228
- General Manager: Steve Govett
- Coach: Bob Hamley
- Captain: John Grant, Jr.
- Arena: Pepsi Center

Team leaders
- Goals: John Grant, Jr. (40)
- Assists: John Grant, Jr. (51)
- Points: John Grant, Jr. (91)
- Penalties in minutes: Dan Ball (44)
- Loose Balls: Bob Snider (161)
- Wins: Dillon Ward (7)
- Goals against average: Dillon Ward (11.58)

The Colorado Mammoth are a lacrosse team based in Denver, Colorado, playing in the National Lacrosse League (NLL). The 2014 season was the 28th in franchise history and 12th as the Mammoth (previously the Washington Power, Pittsburgh Crossefire, and Baltimore Thunder).

== Regular season ==
=== Final standings ===
East Division
P	Team	GP	W	L	PCT	GB	Home	Road	GF	GA	Diff	GF/GP	GA/GP
1	Rochester Knighthawks – xy	18	14	4	.778	0.0	8–1	6–3	210	167	+43	11.67	9.28
2	Toronto Rock – x	18	9	9	.500	5.0	6–3	3–6	219	213	+6	12.17	11.83
3	Buffalo Bandits – x	18	8	10	.444	6.0	6–3	2–7	190	200	−10	10.56	11.11
4	Philadelphia Wings	18	6	12	.333	8.0	2–7	4–5	202	218	−16	11.22	12.11
5	Minnesota Swarm	18	4	14	.222	10.0	2–7	2–7	180	219	−39	10.00	12.17

West Division
P	Team	GP	W	L	PCT	GB	Home	Road	GF	GA	Diff	GF/GP	GA/GP
1	Edmonton Rush – xyz	18	16	2	.889	0.0	8–1	8–1	220	157	+63	12.22	8.72
2	Calgary Roughnecks – x	18	12	6	.667	4.0	6–3	6–3	237	215	+22	13.17	11.94
3	Colorado Mammoth – x	18	8	10	.444	8.0	4–5	4–5	201	228	−27	11.17	12.67
4	Vancouver Stealth	18	4	14	.222	12.0	3–6	1–8	181	223	−42	10.06	12.39

x: Clinched playoff berth; c: Clinched playoff berth by crossing over to another division; y: Clinched division; z: Clinched best regular season record; GP: Games Played
W: Wins; L: Losses; GB: Games back; PCT: Win percentage; Home: Record at Home; Road: Record on the Road; GF: Goals scored; GA: Goals allowed
Differential: Difference between goals scored and allowed; GF/GP: Average number of goals scored per game; GA/GP: Average number of goals allowed per game

== Game log ==
=== Regular season ===
Game	Date	Opponent	Location	Score	OT	Attendance	Record
1	December 28, 2013	Edmonton Rush	Pepsi Center	L 10–13		15,596	0–1
2	January 4, 2014	Vancouver Stealth	Pepsi Center	W 13–12		15,101	1–1
3	January 10, 2014	@ Calgary Roughnecks	Scotiabank Saddledome	L 11–13		11,232	1–2
4	January 11, 2014	@ Edmonton Rush	Rexall Place	L 6–17		7,950	1–3
5	January 17, 2014	@ Vancouver Stealth	Langley Event Centre	L 13–14	OT	2,981	1–4
6	January 18, 2014	Buffalo Bandits	Pepsi Center	L 9–16		14,822	1–5
7	January 25, 2014	@ Calgary Roughnecks	Scotiabank Saddledome	W 14–13	OT	9,121	2–5
8	February 1, 2014	Minnesota Swarm	Pepsi Center	W 14–12		15,127	3–5
9	February 8, 2014	@ Vancouver Stealth	Langley Event Centre	W 10–9		3,614	4–5
10	February 14, 2014	Vancouver Stealth	Pepsi Center	L 9–19		15,023	4–6
11	March 1, 2014	Rochester Knighthawks	Pepsi Center	L 9–11		15,212	4–7
12	March 8, 2014	Calgary Roughnecks	Pepsi Center	W 10–9	OT	17,044	5–7
13	March 15, 2014	@ Buffalo Bandits	First Niagara Center	L 9–12		15,445	5–8
14	March 29, 2014	Philadelphia Wings	Pepsi Center	L 12–14		16,322	5–9
15	April 5, 2014	@ Edmonton Rush	Rexall Place	L 11–12		8,275	5–10
16	April 11, 2014	Edmonton Rush	Pepsi Center	W 10–8		17,109	6–10
17	April 19, 2014	@ Minnesota Swarm	Xcel Energy Center	W 18–12		7,961	7–10
18	April 26, 2014	@ Philadelphia Wings	Wells Fargo Center	W 13–12		7,783	8–10

=== Playoffs ===
Game	Date	Opponent	Location	Score	OT	Attendance	Record
Division Semifinal	May 3, 2014	@ Calgary Roughnecks	Scotiabank Saddledome	L 15–16	OT	12,375	0–1

== Roster ==
Colorado Mammoth roster
Active (21-man) roster		Inactive roster	Coaches
Goaltenders: 31 (Canada) Tye Belanger; 45 (Canada) Dillon Ward; Defensemen: 39 (Canada) Dan Ball; 10 (Canada) Colton Clark; 37 (Canada) Dan Coates; 11 (Canada) John Gallant; 21 (Canada) Chet Koneczny; 7 (Canada) Mike McNamara; 56 (United States) Jon Orsen; 62 (Canada) Creighton Reid; 41 (Canada) Bob Snider	Forwards: 96 (Canada) Joel Dalgarno; 24 (Canada) John Grant, Jr. (C); 23 (Canada) Athan Iannucci; 16 (Canada) Adam Jones; 17 (Canada) Sean Pollock; 2 (United States) Casey Powell; 26 (United States) Drew Westervelt; Transition: 82 (Canada) Joey Cupido; 19 (Canada) Cameron Holding; 4 (Canada) Cameron Mann	Practice squad: 43 (Canada) Cody McMahon	Head coach {{{Head Coach}}} Legend: * Suspended list; (C) Captain; (A) Alternate captain; updated 2014-02-04; NLL Transactions

== Transactions ==
=== Trades ===
August 21, 2013	To Colorado Mammoth Bob Snider	To Vancouver Stealth Ilija Gajic
September 13, 2013	To Colorado Mammoth Drew Westervelt; 4th round pick, 2013 entry draft	To Philadelphia Wings Ryan Hotaling; Two 2nd round picks, 2013 entry draft 1st round pick, 2015 entry draft

== See also ==
- 2014 NLL season
