= 2014 Philadelphia Wings season =

2014 Philadelphia Wings
- League: NLL
- Division: 4th East
- 2014 record: 6–12
- Home record: 2–7
- Road record: 4–5
- Goals for: 202
- Goals against: 218
- General Manager: Johnny Mouradian
- Coach: Blane Harrison
- Captain: Brodie Merrill
- Alternate captains: Kevin Ross; Brett Manney
- Arena: Wells Fargo Center

Team leaders
- Goals: Jordan Hall (34)
- Assists: Kyle Buchanan (46); Ryan Ward (46)
- Points: Jordan Hall (76)
- Penalties in minutes: Brodie Merrill (29)
- Loose Balls: Brodie Merrill (189)
- Wins: Evan Kirk (5)
- Goals against average: Evan Kirk (11.60)

The Philadelphia Wings were a lacrosse team based in Philadelphia playing in the National Lacrosse League (NLL). The 2014 season was the 28th in franchise history and the final season in Philadelphia. After this season, the Wings relocated to Uncasville, Connecticut, to become the New England Black Wolves.

== Regular season ==
=== Current standings ===
East Division
P	Team	GP	W	L	PCT	GB	Home	Road	GF	GA	Diff	GF/GP	GA/GP
1	Rochester Knighthawks – xy	18	14	4	.778	0.0	8–1	6–3	210	167	+43	11.67	9.28
2	Toronto Rock – x	18	9	9	.500	5.0	6–3	3–6	219	213	+6	12.17	11.83
3	Buffalo Bandits – x	18	8	10	.444	6.0	6–3	2–7	190	200	−10	10.56	11.11
4	Philadelphia Wings	18	6	12	.333	8.0	2–7	4–5	202	218	−16	11.22	12.11
5	Minnesota Swarm	18	4	14	.222	10.0	2–7	2–7	180	219	−39	10.00	12.17

West Division
P	Team	GP	W	L	PCT	GB	Home	Road	GF	GA	Diff	GF/GP	GA/GP
1	Edmonton Rush – xyz	18	16	2	.889	0.0	8–1	8–1	220	157	+63	12.22	8.72
2	Calgary Roughnecks – x	18	12	6	.667	4.0	6–3	6–3	237	215	+22	13.17	11.94
3	Colorado Mammoth – x	18	8	10	.444	8.0	4–5	4–5	201	228	−27	11.17	12.67
4	Vancouver Stealth	18	4	14	.222	12.0	3–6	1–8	181	223	−42	10.06	12.39

x: Clinched playoff berth; c: Clinched playoff berth by crossing over to another division; y: Clinched division; z: Clinched best regular season record; GP: Games Played
W: Wins; L: Losses; GB: Games back; PCT: Win percentage; Home: Record at Home; Road: Record on the Road; GF: Goals scored; GA: Goals allowed
Differential: Difference between goals scored and allowed; GF/GP: Average number of goals scored per game; GA/GP: Average number of goals allowed per game

== Game log ==
Game	Date	Opponent	Location	Score	OT	Attendance	Record
1	December 28, 2013	@ Buffalo Bandits	First Niagara Center	W 17–13		16,347	1–0
2	January 11, 2014	@ Rochester Knighthawks	Blue Cross Arena	L 9–13		6,488	1–1
3	January 12, 2014	Buffalo Bandits	Wells Fargo Center	L 11–12	OT	7,365	1–2
4	January 18, 2014	Minnesota Swarm	Wells Fargo Center	L 10–11		5,164	1–3
5	January 19, 2014	@ Minnesota Swarm	Xcel Energy Center	W 15–8		8,213	2–3
6	February 1, 2014	Vancouver Stealth	Wells Fargo Center	W 15–9		6,104	3–3
7	February 7, 2014	@ Toronto Rock	Air Canada Centre	L 10–20		9,087	3–4
8	February 8, 2014	Edmonton Rush	Wells Fargo Center	L 6–8		7,194	3–5
9	February 15, 2014	@ Buffalo Bandits	First Niagara Center	L 7–13		13,980	3–6
10	February 23, 2014	Minnesota Swarm	Wells Fargo Center	L 14–15		6,458	3–7
11	March 8, 2014	@ Rochester Knighthawks	Blue Cross Arena	L 8–13		8,560	3–8
12	March 16, 2014	Rochester Knighthawks	Wells Fargo Center	L 7–11		7,894	3–9
13	March 22, 2014	Toronto Rock	Wells Fargo Center	W 14–13		7,157	4–9
14	March 29, 2014	@ Colorado Mammoth	Pepsi Center	W 14–12		16,322	5–9
15	April 4, 2014	Calgary Roughnecks	Wells Fargo Center	L 9–13		6,659	5–10
16	April 12, 2014	@ Toronto Rock	Air Canada Centre	L 9–10		10,662	5–11
17	April 19, 2014	@ Vancouver Stealth	Langley Events Centre	W 15–11		2,856	6–11
18	April 26, 2014	Colorado Mammoth	Wells Fargo Center	L 12–13		7,783	6–12

== Roster ==
Philadelphia Wings roster
Active (21-man) roster		Inactive roster	Coaches
Goaltenders: 95 (Canada) Don Alton; 51 (Canada) Evan Kirk; Defensemen: 13 (United States) Brett Manney; 5 (United States) Michael Manley; 84 (United States) Brian Megill; 55 (United States) Chad Wiedmaier; 84 (United States) Brian Megill; 29 (United States) Mike Poppleton; 31 (United States) John Ranagan	Forwards: 91 (United States) Kevin Buchanan; 21 (Canada) Kevin Crowley; 44 (Canada) Jordan Hall; 63 (Canada) Tracey Kelusky; 71 (Canada) Kevin Ross; 14 (Canada) Pat Saunders; 99 (United States) Garrett Thul; 4 (Canada) Ryan Ward; Transition: 9 (United States) C.J. Costabile; 17 (Canada) Brodie Merrill (C); 7 (United States) Kyle Sweeney; 11 (United States) Joel White	Practice squad: 6 (United States) Michael Diehl; 37 (United States) Eric Hoffman; 33 (United States) Bill McGlone	Head coach {{{Head Coach}}} Legend: * Suspended list; (C) Captain; (A) Alternate captain; Roster updated 2012-08-10; NLL Transactions

== Transactions ==
=== Trades ===
September 13, 2013	To Philadelphia Wings Evan Kirk	To Minnesota Swarm 1st round pick, 2015 entry draft 1st round pick, 2017 entry draft
September 13, 2013	To Philadelphia Wings Ryan Hotaling; Two 2nd round picks, 2013 entry draft 1st round pick, 2015 entry draft	To Colorado Mammoth Drew Westervelt; 4th round pick, 2013 entry draft
September 14, 2013	To Philadelphia Wings Luke Wiles	To Buffalo Bandits Two 2nd round picks, 2014 entry draft

== See also ==
- 2014 NLL season
