= 2014 NLL season =

- League: National Lacrosse League
- Sport: Indoor lacrosse
- Duration: December 28, 2013 – May 31, 2014
- Games: 18
- Teams: 9

Draft
- Top draft pick: Logan Schuss
- Picked by: Minnesota Swarm

Regular Season
- Top seed: Edmonton Rush
- Season MVP: Cody Jamieson (Rochester Knighthawks)
- Top scorer: Cody Jamieson (Rochester Knighthawks)

Playoffs
- Finals champions: Rochester Knighthawks (5th title)
- Runners-up: Calgary Roughnecks
- Finals MVP: Dan Dawson (Knighthawks)

NLL seasons
- ← 2013 season 2015 season →

The 2014 National Lacrosse League season, the 28th in the history of the NLL, began on December 28, 2013 and ended on May 31, 2014, the date of Game 2 and 3 of the championship series. After finishing the regular season atop the East Division, the Rochester Knighthawks continued winning in the playoffs and took their third consecutive Champion's Cup, the first time a team has won the league title three straight years.

== Teams ==
2014 National Lacrosse League
Division	Team	City	Arena	Capacity
East	Buffalo Bandits	Buffalo, New York	First Niagara Center	19,070
East	Minnesota Swarm	Saint Paul, Minnesota	XCEL Energy Center	18,064
East	Philadelphia Wings	Philadelphia, Pennsylvania	Wachovia Center	19,537
East	Rochester Knighthawks	Rochester, New York	Blue Cross Arena	10,662
East	Toronto Rock	Toronto, Ontario	Air Canada Centre	18,800
West	Calgary Roughnecks	Calgary, Alberta	Scotiabank Saddledome	19,289
West	Colorado Mammoth	Denver, Colorado	Pepsi Center	18,007
West	Edmonton Rush	Edmonton, Alberta	Rexall Place	16,839
West	Vancouver Stealth	Langley, British Columbia	Langley Events Centre	5,276

=== Map of teams ===
East Division West Division

== Milestones and events ==
=== Pre-season ===
- March 15, 2013: Midway through the 2013 season, the league announced that the schedule would expand from 16 games to 18 games in 2014.
- June 27, 2013: The NLL announced that the Washington Stealth would relocate to Langley, British Columbia for 2014. It was later announced that the team would be known as the Vancouver Stealth.
- August 23, 2013: IL Indoor reported that the Minnesota Swarm would be moving back to the Eastern division. The Swarm played in the East from 2005 to 2008 before moving to the West.
- August 23, 2013: IL Indoor also reported that the playoff structure would be changing in 2014. The top three teams, not four, in each division would make the playoffs. Each division winner would receive a bye in the first round while the second- and third-place teams played a one-game division semi-final. The winner would play the division winner in a two-game playoff series. If one team won both games, they would win the series, otherwise the teams would play a 10-minute game to decide the series. If the teams are still tied after 10 minutes, they would play sudden-death overtime. The Championship would be decided by a similar two-game series.
- October 22, 2013: The NLL and the PLPA announced that they had agreed on a new Collective Bargaining Agreement. The new agreement covers the 2014 through 2020 NLL seasons, and includes the previously reported move of the Swarm to the Eastern division as well as the two-game playoff series. Highlights of the CBA include no pay increases for players during the first two years of the agreement, reduction in the size of player rosters and the number of players who dress for games, reduction in the age for free agency from 32 to 30, and the ability for players to reject the "franchise player" designation.

=== Regular season ===
- February 22, 2014: Toronto Rock forward Colin Doyle scored his 499th and 500th goals in Toronto's victory over the Minnesota Swarm.
- March 1, 2014: Just a week after scoring his 500th goal, Colin Doyle recorded his 800th assist and 1300th point in the NLL.
- March 4, 2014: After a 4–7 start, the Colorado Mammoth fired head coach Bob Hamley and assistant coaches Ed Comeau and Sean Ferris.
- March 14, 2014: The Edmonton Rush clinched a playoff berth with a 15–7 road win against the Calgary Roughnecks which gave them a 10–0 record. It is the third straight playoff appearance for the Rush.
- March 16, 2014: The Rochester Knighthawks clinched a playoff berth with an 11–7 road win against the Philadelphia Wings which gave them a 9–3 record. It is the fourth straight playoff appearance for the Knighthawks.
- March 21, 2014: The Edmonton Rush clinched no worse than home-turf advantage for the division semifinals with a 14–5 win at home over the Buffalo Bandits which gave the Rush an 11–0 record. The home playoff game will be the first in franchise history.
- March 30, 2014: The Rochester Knighthawks with a record of 9-4 clinched no worse than home-turf advantage for the division semifinals when the Edmonton Rush won 13–10 on the road against the Toronto Rock. It will be the third straight year the NLL Playoffs have come to Rochester. The loss by the Rock also clinched a playoff berth for the Buffalo Bandits with a record of 8–5, their first playoff appearance since 2012.
- April 5, 2014: John Tavares scored his league-record 800th goal in the Bandits' loss to Calgary. The 16–13 road win by the Roughnecks improved their record to 10–5, clinched them a playoff berth and guaranteed them no worse than home-turf advantage in the division semifinals. It is the 12th straight playoff appearance for the Roughnecks and the eighth consecutive year the NLL Playoffs will visit Calgary.
- April 5, 2014: The Edmonton Rush clinched the West Division regular-season title as well as the league's best overall regular-season record with a 12–11 home victory over the Colorado Mammoth which gave the Rush a 14–0 record. It is the first regular-season division title for the Rush.
- April 11, 2014: The longest season-opening winning streak in NLL history comes to an end, as the Colorado Mammoth hand the Edmonton Rush their first loss of the year, 10–8 at Pepsi Center. The Rush began the season with 14 straight wins.
- April 12, 2014: The Toronto Rock clinched a playoff berth with a 10–9 win at home against the Philadelphia Wings that improved their record to 7–9. It is the fifth straight playoff appearance for the Rock.
- April 12, 2014: The Rochester Knighthawks who had improved their record to 12–4 with a win earlier in the evening clinched the East Division regular-season title when the Buffalo Bandits lost 10–9 on the road against the Minnesota Swarm. It is the first time the Knighthawks have finished the regular season atop their division since 2007.
- April 19, 2014: The Colorado Mammoth clinch a playoff berth with an 18–12 road win over the Minnesota Swarm which improved their record to 7–10. In the game, John Grant, Jr. became the third player in league history to reach the 600 career goal plateau. It is the fourth straight playoff appearance for the Mammoth.
- April 26, 2014: The Toronto Rock clinched home-turf for the East Division Semifinal with an 8–6 road win against the Minnesota Swarm that evened their record at 9-9. It is the fifth straight year the NLL Playoffs have come to Toronto.

=== Playoffs ===
- May 3, 2014: The division semifinal playoff games were played with the Buffalo Bandits defeating the Toronto Rock on the road and the Calgary Roughnecks winning in overtime at home against the Colorado Mammoth. The win for the Bandits snapped their season-ending 8-game losing streak.
- May 10, 2014: The first multiple-game playoff series since the 1998 NLL Championship Series began as the Rochester Knighthawks visited the Buffalo Bandits in Game 1 of the East Finals, and the Edmonton Rush visited the Calgary Roughnecks in Game 1 of the West Finals.
- May 16, 2014: In the first NLL division finals series to conclude under the newly adopted format, the Edmonton Rush won Game 2 at home to force the 10-minute Game 3 which started at 9:20 pm PDT. The Calgary Roughnecks scored 2 goals in the first three minutes of Game 3 and held on for a 2–1 win in the NLL's first mini-game. The first goal ever scored in a mini-game came from Shawn Evans.
- May 17, 2014: Just as Edmonton did the previous day, the Rochester Knighthawks also won Game 2 at home to force the 10-minute Game 3 which started at 9:45 pm EDT. The Knighthawks and Buffalo Bandits exchanged goals in regulation time of Game 3. It took 2:08 for Cory Vitarelli to score the first series-winning, deciding mini-game overtime goal under the new playoff format for Rochester.
- May 24, 2014: The Champion's Cup Finals got underway with the Calgary Roughnecks winning Game 1 at home against the Rochester Knighthawks in front of 16,541 fans. Dane Dobbie was the game's first star leading the Roughnecks offensively with three goals and an assist on 10 shots. He also collected two loose balls. Roughnecks' goaltender Mike Poulin had 36 saves and collected a loose ball to record the win. Craig Point had two goals on nine shots to take third star honors for the Knighthawks. The Roughnecks jumped out in front 1-0 less than three minutes into the game and 2-0 less than 10 minutes in. The Knighthawks got within a goal twice at 4–3 in the second quarter and 7-6 late in the third quarter. But the Roughnecks scored the first three goals of the fourth quarter to ice the game.
- May 31, 2014: In Game 2 of the Champion's Cup Finals, the Rochester Knighthawks broke open a tight game by scoring the first four goals of the fourth quarter in less than six minutes to extend their lead to five goals over the Calgary Roughnecks. The Knighthawks ended with a 6–1 advantage in the fourth quarter leading them to a 16–10 victory in front of 9,188 home fans. Dan Dawson led the way for the Knighthawks with three goals and four assists on nine shots and was named the game's first star. Cody Jamieson chipped in with three goals and three assists on eight shots while retrieving four loose balls. Stephen Keogh had three goals and an assist on nine shots with six loose balls. Paul Dawson and Dylan Evans each scooped up seven loose balls. Evans also won 15 of 28 (54%) faceoffs. Knighthawks netminder Matt Vinc had 38 saves to record the win. In the ensuing Game 3, the Roughnecks jumped out to an early 2–0 lead in the first five minutes on goals by Shawn Evans and Curtis Dickson. However, less than four minutes later, the Knighthawks tied the game on goals by Craig Point and Joe Walters. Just 24 seconds after the Knighthawks tied the game, they took the lead on another goal by Point with 59 seconds to play. Dylan Evans collected three loose balls and won five of six (83%) faceoffs in the mini-game. Vinc had seven saves to record the win. Point took first-star honors for the mini-game. With the victory, the Knighthawks became the first team in NLL history to win three consecutive league championships. Dawson, who missed Game 1 with a chest injury he suffered in the East Finals, was named Champion's Cup Finals Most Valuable Player.

== Final standings ==
East Division
P	Team	GP	W	L	PCT	GB	Home	Road	GF	GA	Diff	GF/GP	GA/GP
1	Rochester Knighthawks – xy	18	14	4	.778	0.0	8–1	6–3	210	167	+43	11.67	9.28
2	Toronto Rock – x	18	9	9	.500	5.0	6–3	3–6	219	213	+6	12.17	11.83
3	Buffalo Bandits – x	18	8	10	.444	6.0	6–3	2–7	190	200	−10	10.56	11.11
4	Philadelphia Wings	18	6	12	.333	8.0	2–7	4–5	202	218	−16	11.22	12.11
5	Minnesota Swarm	18	4	14	.222	10.0	2–7	2–7	180	219	−39	10.00	12.17

West Division
P	Team	GP	W	L	PCT	GB	Home	Road	GF	GA	Diff	GF/GP	GA/GP
1	Edmonton Rush – xyz	18	16	2	.889	0.0	8–1	8–1	220	157	+63	12.22	8.72
2	Calgary Roughnecks – x	18	12	6	.667	4.0	6–3	6–3	237	215	+22	13.17	11.94
3	Colorado Mammoth – x	18	8	10	.444	8.0	4–5	4–5	201	228	−27	11.17	12.67
4	Vancouver Stealth	18	4	14	.222	12.0	3–6	1–8	181	223	−42	10.06	12.39

x: Clinched playoff berth; c: Clinched playoff berth by crossing over to another division; y: Clinched division; z: Clinched best regular season record; GP: Games Played
W: Wins; L: Losses; GB: Games back; PCT: Win percentage; Home: Record at Home; Road: Record on the Road; GF: Goals scored; GA: Goals allowed
Differential: Difference between goals scored and allowed; GF/GP: Average number of goals scored per game; GA/GP: Average number of goals allowed per game

== Scoring leaders ==
Note: GP = Games played; G = Goals; A = Assists; Pts = Points; PIM = Penalty minutes; LB = Loose Balls

Player	Team	GP	G	A	Pts	PIM	LB
Cody Jamieson	Rochester Knighthawks	18	36	72	108	26	70
Shawn Evans	Calgary Roughnecks	18	26	79	105	8	89
Garrett Billings	Toronto Rock	15	32	69	101	2	86
Dan Dawson	Rochester Knighthawks	18	19	72	91	8	60
John Grant Jr.	Colorado Mammoth	17	40	51	91	20	64
Dane Dobbie	Calgary Roughnecks	18	51	39	90	22	32
Stephan Leblanc	Toronto Rock	18	45	43	88	27	93
Jeff Shattler	Calgary Roughnecks	18	35	49	84	10	71
Callum Crawford	Minnesota Swarm	18	26	54	80	8	92
Rhys Duch	Vancouver Stealth	17	36	44	80	28	83

== Leading goaltenders ==
Note: GP = Games played; Mins = Minutes played; W = Wins; L = Losses: GA = Goals Allowed; SV% = Save Percentage; GAA = Goals against average

Player	Team	GP	Mins	W	L	GA	SV%	GAA
Aaron Bold	Edmonton Rush	18	1010	15	2	147	0.791	8.73
Matt Vinc	Rochester Knighthawks	16	947	12	3	151	0.798	9.57
Anthony Cosmo	Buffalo Bandits	18	1063	8	9	191	0.797	10.77
Tyler Carlson	Minnesota Swarm	18	593	2	7	112	0.727	11.32
Mike Poulin	Calgary Roughnecks	18	942	12	5	180	0.770	11.45

== Playoffs ==
Division semifinals
East Division
E2	Toronto	13
E3	Buffalo	15
West Division
W2	Calgary	16*
W3	Colorado	15

Division finals
E1	Rochester	2
E3	Buffalo	1
W1	Edmonton	1
W2	Calgary	2

Finals
2	Rochester	2
3	Calgary	1

*Overtime

=== Division semifinals ===
==== (E2) Rochester Knighthawks vs. (E3) Buffalo Bandits ====
May 3, 2014	Toronto Rock	13–15 (2–4, 4–5, 3–2, 3–5)	Buffalo Bandits	Air Canada Centre; Attendance: 7,867

Game reference

Brandon Miller
Goalies
Anthony Cosmo

	0–1	03:31 – Watt (Benesch)
Doyle (Hellyer, Johnston)	1–1
	1–2	09:19 – Benesch (D. Smith, Cosmo)
	1–3	10:51 – Williams
	1–4	11:48 – Benesch (Tavares, D. Smith)
Beirnes (Hellyer, Diachenko) – 14:07	2–4
	2–5	18:10 – Steenhuis (R. Smith)
Sanderson (Doyle, Leblanc) – 18:49	3–5
	3–6	19:20 – Rooney (Tavares, Suddons)
Hellyer (Leblanc, Edwards) – 20:36	4–6
Doyle (Beirnes) (PP) – 23:06	5–6
Doyle (Hellyer, Sanderson) – 24:28	6–6
	6–7	24:49 – Benesch (Resetarits, Wilde)
Beirnes (Sanderson, Hellyer) – 27:35	7–7
	7–8	29:06 – Benesch (Steenhuis) (PP)
Beirnes (Doyle, Sanderson) – 32:38	8–8
Sanderson (Beirnes, Doyle) (PP) – 36:07	9–8
	9–9	40:37 – Benesch (Steenhuis, Williams)
	9–10	43:26 – Benesch (Williams, Rooney)
Diachenko (Hellyer, Doyle) – 42:27	10–10
	10–11	45:33 – Tavares (Steenhuis, Benesch) (PP)
	10–12	46:13 – D. Smith
Diachenko (Leblanc, Hellyer) – 48:09	11–12
	11–13	49:25 – Benesch (Steenhuis) (PP)
Diachenko – 55:11	12–13
	12–14	55:35 – Culp (Steenhuis, Thorimbert)
Beirnes (Sanderson, Doyle) (PP) – 56:08	13–14
	13–15	56:50 – Tavares (Benesch, Resetarits) (PP)

12 min
Penalties
12 min
54
Shots
57

==== (W2) Colorado Mammoth vs. (W3) Calgary Roughnecks ====
May 3, 2014	Calgary Roughnecks	16–15 OT (2–3, 7–7, 5–4, 1–1, 1–0)	Colorado Mammoth	Scotiabank Saddledome; Attendance: 12,375

Game reference

Mike Poulin
Frankie Scigliano
Goalies
Dillon Ward
Alex Buque

Dobbie (Ranger, Veltman) – 01:24	1–0
	1–1	04:53 – Iannucci (Cupido, Ward)
	1–2	08:53 – Coates (Ward)
	1–3	08:24 – Jones (Grant, Snider)
Snider (Leung, Manning) – 08:57	2–3
	2–4	15:45 – Jones (Grant, Pollock)
	2–5	16:18 – Grant (Reid, Holding)
Shattler (Evans, Dickson) – 16:43	3–5
	3–6	17:29 – Dalgarno (Reid)
Evans (Veltman, Dickson) – 18:48	4–6
Veltman (Dobbie, Evans) – 19:20	5–6
Snider – 19:26	6–6
	6–7	21:01 – Cupido (Holding) (SH)
	6–8	21:09 – Snider (SH)
Dobbie (Evans, Veltman) (PP) – 21:49	7–8
Dickson (Veltman, Dobbie) – 22:15	8–8
	8–9	24:17 – Iannucci (Grant, Holding)
	8–10	26:04 – Pollock (Grant, Reid)
Dobbie (Shattler) – 29:41	9–10
Evans (Veltman) (PP) – 31:12	10–10
Dickson (Shattler, Dobbie) – 33:49	11–10
Shattler (Veltman, Dickson) (PP) – 35:49	12–10
	12–11	41:00 – Jones (Coates, Koneczny)
Dobbie (Evans) – 41:21	13–11
	13–12	42:27 – Jones (Iannucci, Decker)
	13–13	43:42 – Grant (MacLeod, Pollock)
Evans (McBride) – 44:26	14–13
	14–14	44:44 – Holding (Reid)
	14–15	45:41 – Jones (Grant, Iannucci) (PP)
Dickson (Evans) – 53:58	15–15
Evans (Ranger, Dobbie) – 61:23	16–15

6 min
Penalties
10 min
60
Shots
50

=== Division Finals (best of three) ===
==== (E1) Rochester Knighthawks vs. (E3) Buffalo Bandits ====
May 10, 2014	Buffalo Bandits	12–8 (2–3, 4–2, 0–2, 6–1)	Rochester Knighthawks	First Niagara Center; Attendance: 9,209

Game reference

Anthony Cosmo
Goalies
Matt Vinc

Steenhuis (Brock) – 01:05	1–0
	1–1	09:04 – Jamieson (D. Dawson, Keogh)
Steenhuis (Tavares) (PP) – 01:29	2–1
	2–2	09:49 – D. Dawson (S. Self, Vinc)
	2–3	11:48 – Walters (D. Dawson, Point)
	2–4	17:44 – Keogh (Campbell, Llord)
Culp (Resetarits, Tavares) – 18:14	3–4
Tavares (Suddons, Brock) – 21:08	4–4
Tavares (Steenhuis, Benesch) – 22:35	5–4
Steenhuis (Culp, Brock) – 24:27	6–4
	6–5	26:32 – Jamieson (Vitarelli) (PP)
	6–6	38:51 – D. Dawson (Point, Jamieson)
	6–7	42:36 – Vitarelli (Walters, Jamieson)
D. Smith (Benesch, Steenhuis) – 45:55	7–7
	7–8	52:34 – Vitarelli (D. Dawson, Jamieson) (PP)
Tavares (Resetarits) – 53:50	8–8
D. Smith (Benesch, Williams) – 54:09	9–8
D. Smith (Steenhuis, Benesch) – 55:08	10–8
Steenhuis (D. Smith, Williams) – 56:35	11–8
Tavares (D. Smith, Brock) – 57:20	12–8

10 min
Penalties
6 min
42
Shots
44

May 17, 2014	Rochester Knighthawks	2–1 OT (1–1, 1–0)	Buffalo Bandits	Blue Cross Arena; Attendance: 8,651

Game reference

Matt Vinc
Goalies
Anthony Cosmo

	0–1	05:22 – Resetarits (Steenhuis)
McCready (Walters) – 07:38	1–1
Vitarelli (Sullivan, B. Self) – 11:36	2–1

0 min
Penalties
2 min
9
Shots
7

May 17, 2014	Rochester Knighthawks	13–8 (4–4, 6–1, 1–1, 2–2)	Buffalo Bandits	Blue Cross Arena; Attendance: 8,651

Game reference

Matt Vinc
Goalies
Anthony Cosmo

Vitarelli (Jamieson) – 03:16	1–0
	1–1	04:03 – Benesch (D. Smith, Priolo)
	1–2	06:10 – D. Smith (Culp)
	1–3	09:46 – D. Smith (Steenhuis)
D. Dawson – 10:41	2–3
Powless (Keogh) (PP) – 13:41	3–3
D. Dawson (Walters, Jamieson) – 14:11	4–3
	4–4	14:37 – Rooney (D. Smith, Priolo)
Jamieson (Powless) (PP) – 16:34	5–4
Jamieson (B. Self) – 18:31	6–4
Powless (Jamieson, McCready) – 22:54	7–4
Powless (Jamieson) (PP) – 23:33	8–4
McCready (Walters) – 24:05	9–4
	9–5	26:51 – Steenhuis (Benesch, Tavares) (PP)
Keogh (Jamieson, McCready) – 27:40	10–5
Campbell – 34:01	11–5
	11–6	38:04 – Tavares (D. Smith, Cosmo)
McCready (Walters) – 50:17	12–6
	12–7	51:55 – D. Smith
	12–8	52:15 – Rooney (Benesch, Culp)
Jamieson (Powless) – 53:21	13–8

12 min
Penalties
16 min
43
Shots
35

Knighthawks win series 2–1.

==== (W1) Edmonton Rush vs. (E3) Calgary Roughnecks ====
May 10, 2014	Calgary Roughnecks	12–11 OT (1–4, 4–3, 4–1, 2–3, 1–0)	Edmonton Rush	Scotiabank Saddledome; Attendance: 13,618

Game reference

Aaron Bold
Goalies
Mike Poulin

Ranger (Shattler, Evans) – 03:06	1–0
	1–1	03:32 – Lintz
	1–2	03:53 – Matthews (Loewen)
	1–3	07:57 – Church (Matthews, Knight)
	1–4	10:07 – Church (Matthews, Conway) (PP)
	1–5	17:19 – Matthews (Conway, Knight) (PP)
Dobbie (Dickson) (PP) – 20:05	2–5
Shattler – 24:55	3–5
Dickson (Leung) – 25:08	4–5
	4–6	26:53 – Greer (Conway, Davis)
	4–7	27:13 – Matthews (Knight, Davis)
Harnett (PP) – 29:11	5–7
Leung – 35:03	6–7
Evans (Dickson) – 37:20	7–7
	7–8	38:04 – Bilic (Dilks)
Veltman (Evans, Shattler) – 41:54	8–8
Dickson (Evans) – 43:20	9–8
	9–9	46:58 – Knight (Conway, Matthews) (PP)
	9–10	53:39 – Loewen (Greer, Cornwall)
Dickson (Evans) – 55:11	10–10
	10–11	58:36 – Greer (Matthews, Bilic)
Dickson (PS) – 59:38	11–11
Shattler – 60:46	12–11

19 min
Penalties
8 min
40
Shots
56

May 16, 2014	Edmonton Rush	1–2	Calgary Roughnecks	Rexall Place; Attendance: 9,120

Game reference

Aaron Bold
Goalies
Mike Poulin

	0–1	Evans (Veltman, Shattler) – 01:55
	0–2	Evans (Shattler) – 02:59
Greer (Knight, Conway) – 08:21	1–2

0 min
Penalties
0 min
10
Shots
6

May 16, 2014	Edmonton Rush	15–13 (8–2, 4–4, 2–4, 1–3)	Calgary Roughnecks	Rexall Place; Attendance: 9,120

Game reference

Aaron Bold
Goalies
Mike Poulin
Frankie Scigliano

Matthews – 04:37	1–0
Greer (Loewen, Church) – 05:02	2–0
	2–1	07:33 – Evans (Ranger, Leung)
Bilic (Bold) – 08:33	3–1
	3–2	09:15 – Dickson (Ranger)
Matthews (Loewen, Cornwall) – 10:10	4–2
Dilks – 10:46	5–2
Davis (Greer, Cornwall) – 10:58	6–2
LaFontaine (Bold) – 11:33	7–2
Greer – 11:40	8–2
Knight (Davis, Corbeil) (SH) – 15:23	9–2
Conway (Knight) (PP) – 18:33	10–2
Corbeil (Rubisch, LaFontaine) (PP) – 20:35	11–2
	11–3	21:00 – Veltman (Leung)
	11–4	22:02 – Shattler (Evans, Harnett)
	11–5	24:09 – Dobbie (Veltman) (PP)
	11–6	27:13 – Dobbie (Evans)
Knight (Greer) – 27:45	12–6
Loewen (Conway, Church) – 32:23	13–6
	13–7	32:38 – Evans (Veltman, Dickson)
	13–8	38:05 – Dobbie (Evans, Dickson)
	13–9	41:48 – Veltman (Dobbie, Dickson) (PP)
Matthews (Conway) (PP) – 43:06	14–9
	14–10	44:13 – Evans (McBride)
	14–11	48:23 – Ranger
	14–12	48:45 – Harnett
	14–13	54:37 – Ranger (Shattler, Dickson)
Bilic (Rubisch) (ENG) – 59:46	15–13

12 min
Penalties
16 min
50
Shots
44

Roughnecks win series 2–1.

=== NLL Final (best of three) ===
==== (E1) Rochester Knighthawks vs. (W2) Calgary Roughnecks ====
May 24, 2014	Calgary Roughnecks	10–7 (3–1, 4–3, 0–2, 3–1)	Rochester Knighthawks	Scotiabank Saddledome; Attendance: 16,541

Game reference

Mike Poulin
Goalies
Matt Vinc

Shattler (Evans, Veltman) – 02:19	1–0
Ranger (Evans) (SH) – 09:35	2–0
	2–1	10:11 – Keogh (PP)
Dickson (Veltman, Evans) – 13:04	3–1
Ranger (Dickson, Shattler) – 17:43	4–1
	4–2	17:59 – Powless (McCready, Vitarelli)
	4–3	19:16 – Point (McCready, Walters)
Dobbie (Veltman) – 22:55	5–3
Dobbie (MacRae) – 23:29	6–3
Dickson (Evans, Shattler) – 28:49	7–3
	7–4	29:07 – Walters (Jamieson, P. Dawson)
	7–5	41:49 – Vitarelli (Walters, McCready)
	7–6	44:41 – Point (Jamieson, Vitarelli) (PP)
Dobbie (Leung, Carnegie) – 47:07	8–6
Carnegie (Dobbie) (PP) – 50:48	9–6
Evans – 54:32	10–6
	10–7	59:50 – Jamieson (Powless, Walters)

10 min
Penalties
12 min
41
Shots
43

May 31, 2014	Rochester Knighthawks	3–2	Calgary Roughnecks	Blue Cross Arena; Attendance: 9,188

Game reference

Matt Vinc
Goalies
Mike Poulin

	0–1	02:42 – Evans (Shattler, Dickson)
	0–2	04:40 – Dickson (Evans)
Point (Walters, Sullivan) – 07:46	1–2
Walters (Llord) – 08:37	2–2
Point (Walters, D. Dawson) – 09:01	3–2

0 min
Penalties
2 min
11
Shots
9

May 31, 2014	Rochester Knighthawks	16–10 (3–3, 4–3, 3–3, 6–1)	Calgary Roughnecks	Blue Cross Arena; Attendance: 9,188

Game reference

Matt Vinc
Goalies
Mike Poulin
Frankie Scigliano

	0–1	00:36 – Evans (Dobbie)
	0–2	01:57 – Dickson
Jamieson (D. Dawson, Vitarelli) – 02:20	1–2
	1–3	06:14 – Veltman (Dobbie)
Keogh – 08:32	2–3
D. Dawson (Jamieson) (PP) – 12:56	3–3
Walters (Point) – 17:32	4–3
	4–4	18:16 – Dickson (Harnett, Poulin) (SH)
	4–5	19:43 – Dickson
	4–6	20:06 – Shattler (McBride)
Keogh (Dawson, Walters) – 22:54	5–6
Vitarelli (Dawson, Walters) – 26:25	6–6
Jamieson (Point, B. Self)	7–6
Vitarelli – 32:23	8–6
P. Dawson – 33:41	9–6
S. Self (SH) – 37:42	10–6
	10–7	40:12 – Shattler (Dickson)
	10–8	41:29 – Dobbie (Shattler, Veltman)
	10–9	44:59 – Shattler (Dickson, Evans)
D. Dawson (Keogh) – 46:05	11–9
Jamieson (Powless, D. Dawson) – 48:57	12–9
D. Dawson (Walters) – 49:29	13–9
Point (Walters, Jamieson) – 50:14	14–9
	14–10	51:23 – Ranger (Shattler, Dickson)
Keogh (Jamieson) – 53:41	15–10
Sullivan – 54:31	16–10

14 min
Penalties
14 min
46
Shots
48

Knighthawks wins series 2–1.

== Regular-season results table ==
Abbreviation and Color Key: Buffalo Bandits - BUF • Calgary Roughnecks - CAL • Colorado Mammoth - COL • Edmonton Rush - EDM • Philadelphia Wings - PHI Minnesota Swarm - MIN • Rochester Knighthawks - ROC • Toronto Rock - TOR • Vancouver Stealth - VAN Win • Loss • Home
Club	Match																	
Club	1	2	3	4	5	6	7	8	9	10	11	12	13	14	15	16	17	18
Buffalo Bandits	PHI	TOR	PHI	COL	ROC	TOR	ROC	PHI	MIN	COL	EDM	MIN	VAN	COL	MIN	TOR	ROC	ROC
Buffalo Bandits	13-17	12-10	12-11 (OT)	16-9	11-10	12-10	6-9	13-7	12-9	12-9	5-14	9-10	8-12	13-16	9-10	9-13	4-8	14-16
Calgary Roughnecks	TOR	COL	EDM	VAN	COL	MIN	VAN	ROC	TOR	COL	EDM	VAN	MIN	PHI	BUF	EDM	EDM	VAN
Calgary Roughnecks	11-16	13-11	8-15	15-12	13-14 (OT)	15-13	20-9	11-10	19-13	9-10 (OT)	7-15	13-8	15-11	13-9	16-13	11-15	14-13 (OT)	14-8
Colorado Mammoth	EDM	VAN	CAL	EDM	VAN	BUF	CAL	MIN	VAN	VAN	ROC	CAL	BUF	PHI	EDM	EDM	MIN	PHI
Colorado Mammoth	10-13	13-12	11-13	6-17	13-14	9-16	14-13 (OT)	14-12	10-9	9-19	9-11	10-9 (OT)	9-12	12-14	11-12	10-8	18-12	13-12
Edmonton Rush	COL	COL	CAL	VAN	ROC	PHI	MIN	TOR	VAN	CAL	BUF	ROC	TOR	COL	COL	CAL	CAL	VAN
Edmonton Rush	13-10	17-6	15-8	9-8	8-7 (OT)	8-6	14-9	11-10	10-9	15-7	14-5	15-11	13-10	12-11	8-10	15-11	13-14 (OT)	10-5
Minnesota Swarm	ROC	VAN	PHI	PHI	COL	CAL	EDM	TOR	PHI	BUF	TOR	BUF	CAL	ROC	ROC	BUF	COL	TOR
Minnesota Swarm	6-8	5-8	11-10	8-15	12-14	13-15	9-14	12-14	15-14	9-12	8-9 (OT)	10-9	11-15	14-15	9-12	10-9	12-18	6-8
Philadelphia Wings	BUF	ROC	BUF	MIN	MIN	VAN	TOR	EDM	BUF	MIN	ROC	ROC	TOR	COL	CAL	TOR	VAN	COL
Philadelphia Wings	17-13	9-13	11-12 (OT)	10-11	15-8	15-9	10-20	6-8	7-13	14-15	8-13	7-11	14-13	14-12	9-13	9-10	15-11	12-13
Rochester Knighthawks	MIN	PHI	TOR	BUF	EDM	BUF	TOR	CAL	COL	PHI	TOR	PHI	EDM	MIN	MIN	VAN	BUF	BUF
Rochester Knighthawks	8-6	13-9	12-8	10-11	7-8 (OT)	9-6	17-9	10-11	11-9	13-8	17-12	11-7	11-15	15-14	12-9	10-7	8-4	16-14
Toronto Rock	CAL	BUF	ROC	VAN	BUF	PHI	ROC	MIN	EDM	CAL	ROC	MIN	PHI	EDM	VAN	PHI	BUF	MIN
Toronto Rock	16-11	10-12	8-12	17-12	10-12	20-10	9-17	14-12	10-11	13-19	12-17	9-8 (OT)	13-14	10-13	17-9	10-9	13-9	8-6
Vancouver Stealth	COL	MIN	COL	CAL	EDM	TOR	PHI	COL	COL	CAL	EDM	CAL	BUF	TOR	ROC	PHI	EDM	CAL
Vancouver Stealth	12-13	8-5	14-13	12-15	8-9	12-17	9-15	9-10	19-9	9-20	9-10	8-13	12-8	9-17	7-10	11-15	5-10	8-14

== Awards ==
=== Annual awards ===
For the first time, the winners of the NLL's annual awards were not announced during the playoffs. Instead, three finalists for each award were announced during the two weeks following the final Championship game. The winners were announced at the first-ever NLL Season Awards Ceremony on September 21, 2014.

Award	Winner	Other Finalists
Most Valuable Player	Cody Jamieson, Rochester	Garrett Billings, Toronto; Matt Vinc, Rochester
Goaltender of the Year	Matt Vinc, Rochester	Aaron Bold, Edmonton; Anthony Cosmo, Buffalo
Defensive Player of the Year	Kyle Rubisch, Edmonton	Chris Corbeil, Edmonton; Steve Priolo, Buffalo
Transition Player of the Year	Jordan MacIntosh, Minnesota	Brodie Merrill, Philadelphia; Jeremy Thompson, Edmonton
Rookie of the Year	Logan Schuss, Minnesota	Robert Church, Edmonton; Dillon Ward, Colorado
Sportsmanship Award	Garrett Billings, Toronto	Curtis Knight, Edmonton; Shawn Williams, Buffalo
GM of the Year	Derek Keenan, Edmonton	Mike Board, Calgary; Curt Styres, Rochester
Les Bartley Award	Derek Keenan, Edmonton	Mike Hasen, Rochester; Curt Malawsky, Calgary
Executive of the Year Award	John Bean, Calgary	Curt Styres, Rochester; Bruce Urban, Edmonton
Tom Borrelli Award	Bob Chavez, ILIndoor.com	

=== All-Rookie team ===
- Robert Church, Edmonton
- Tyler Digby, Vancouver
- Karsen Leung, Calgary
- Logan Schuss, Minnesota
- Garrett Thul, Philadelphia
- Dillon Ward, Colorado

=== All-Pro teams ===
==== First team ====
- Cody Jamieson, Rochester
- Shawn Evans, Calgary
- Garrett Billings, Toronto
- Jordan MacIntosh, Minnesota
- Kyle Rubisch, Edmonton
- Matt Vinc, Rochester

==== Second team ====
- Dane Dobbie, Calgary
- Adam Jones, Colorado
- Curtis Dickson, Calgary
- Brodie Merrill, Philadelphia
- Chris Corbeil, Edmonton
- Aaron Bold, Edmonton

=== Monthly awards ===
Awards are given out monthly for the best overall player and best rookie.

Month	Overall	Rookie
January	Adam Jones	Tyler Digby
February	Garrett Billings	Logan Schuss
March	Garrett Billings	Logan Schuss
April	Rob Hellyer	Logan Schuss

== Stadiums and locations ==
Buffalo Bandits	Minnesota Swarm	Philadelphia Wings	Rochester Knighthawks	Toronto Rock
First Niagara Center	Xcel Energy Center	Wells Fargo Center	Blue Cross Arena	Air Canada Centre
Capacity: 19,070	Capacity: 17,954	Capacity: 19,537	Capacity: 11,200	Capacity: 18,819

Calgary Roughnecks	Colorado Mammoth	Edmonton Rush	Vancouver Stealth
Scotiabank Saddledome	Pepsi Center	Rexall Place	Langley Events Centre
Capacity: 19,289	Capacity: 18,007	Capacity: 16,839	Capacity: 5,276

== Attendance ==
=== Regular season ===
Home team	Home games	Average attendance	Total attendance
Colorado Mammoth	9	15,706	141,356
Buffalo Bandits	9	14,611	131,506
Calgary Roughnecks	9	10,615	95,535
Toronto Rock	9	10,533	94,802
Edmonton Rush	9	7,844	70,600
Rochester Knighthawks	9	7,654	68,892
Minnesota Swarm	9	7,457	67,120
Philadelphia Wings	9	6,864	61,778
Vancouver Stealth	9	3,590	32,312
League	81	9,430	763,901

=== Playoffs ===
Home team	Home games	Average attendance	Total attendance
Calgary Roughnecks	3	14,178	42,534
Buffalo Bandits	1	9,209	9,209
Edmonton Rush	2	9,120	18,240
Toronto Rock	1	7,867	7,867
Rochester Knighthawks	4	6,622	26,490
League	11	9,485	104,340

== See also ==
- 2014 in sports
