= 2014 Vancouver Stealth season =

2014 Vancouver Stealth
- League: NLL
- Division: 4th West
- 2014 record: 4 - 14
- Home record: 3 - 6
- Road record: 1 - 8
- Goals for: 181
- Goals against: 223
- General Manager: Doug Locker
- Coach: Chris Hall
- Captain: Kyle Sorensen
- Alternate captains: Rhys Duch; Mike Grimes
- Arena: Langley Event Centre

Team leaders
- Goals: Rhys Duch (36)
- Assists: Rhys Duch (44)
- Points: Rhys Duch (80)
- Penalties in minutes: Matt Beers (70)
- Loose Balls: Tyler Garrison (106)
- Wins: Tyler Richards (4)
- Goals against average: Tyler Richards (12.01)

The Vancouver Stealth are a lacrosse team based in Vancouver, British Columbia. The team plays in the National Lacrosse League (NLL). The 2014 season was the inaugural season in Vancouver, though it was the 15th in franchise history. They previously played in Everett, Washington, San Jose, and Albany, New York.

== Regular season ==
=== Current standings ===
East Division
P	Team	GP	W	L	PCT	GB	Home	Road	GF	GA	Diff	GF/GP	GA/GP
1	Rochester Knighthawks – xy	18	14	4	.778	0.0	8–1	6–3	210	167	+43	11.67	9.28
2	Toronto Rock – x	18	9	9	.500	5.0	6–3	3–6	219	213	+6	12.17	11.83
3	Buffalo Bandits – x	18	8	10	.444	6.0	6–3	2–7	190	200	−10	10.56	11.11
4	Philadelphia Wings	18	6	12	.333	8.0	2–7	4–5	202	218	−16	11.22	12.11
5	Minnesota Swarm	18	4	14	.222	10.0	2–7	2–7	180	219	−39	10.00	12.17

West Division
P	Team	GP	W	L	PCT	GB	Home	Road	GF	GA	Diff	GF/GP	GA/GP
1	Edmonton Rush – xyz	18	16	2	.889	0.0	8–1	8–1	220	157	+63	12.22	8.72
2	Calgary Roughnecks – x	18	12	6	.667	4.0	6–3	6–3	237	215	+22	13.17	11.94
3	Colorado Mammoth – x	18	8	10	.444	8.0	4–5	4–5	201	228	−27	11.17	12.67
4	Vancouver Stealth	18	4	14	.222	12.0	3–6	1–8	181	223	−42	10.06	12.39

x: Clinched playoff berth; c: Clinched playoff berth by crossing over to another division; y: Clinched division; z: Clinched best regular season record; GP: Games Played
W: Wins; L: Losses; GB: Games back; PCT: Win percentage; Home: Record at Home; Road: Record on the Road; GF: Goals scored; GA: Goals allowed
Differential: Difference between goals scored and allowed; GF/GP: Average number of goals scored per game; GA/GP: Average number of goals allowed per game

== Game log ==
Game	Date	Opponent	Location	Score	OT	Attendance	Record
1	January 4, 2014	@ Colorado Mammoth	Pepsi Center	L 12–13		15,101	0–1
2	January 11, 2014	Minnesota Swarm	Langley Event Centre	W 8–5		5,276	1–1
3	January 17, 2014	Colorado Mammoth	Langley Event Centre	W 14–13	OT	2,981	2–1
4	January 18, 2014	@ Calgary Roughnecks	Scotiabank Saddledome	L 12–15		8,957	2–2
5	January 25, 2014	Edmonton Rush	Langley Event Centre	L 8–9		3,840	2–3
6	January 31, 2014	@ Toronto Rock	Air Canada Centre	L 12–17		11,234	2–4
7	February 1, 2014	@ Philadelphia Wings	Wells Fargo Center	L 9–15		6,104	2–5
8	February 8, 2014	Colorado Mammoth	Langley Event Centre	L 9–10		3,614	2–6
9	February 14, 2014	@ Colorado Mammoth	Pepsi Center	W 19–9		15,023	3–6
10	February 15, 2014	@ Calgary Roughnecks	Scotiabank Saddledome	L 9–20		11,162	3–7
11	March 8, 2014	@ Edmonton Rush	Rexall Place	L 9–10		7,898	3–8
12	March 21, 2014	Calgary Roughnecks	Langley Event Centre	L 8–13		3,629	3–9
13	March 29, 2014	Buffalo Bandits	Langley Event Centre	W 12–8		3,197	4–9
14	April 5, 2014	Toronto Rock	Langley Event Centre	L 9–17		3,721	4–10
15	April 12, 2014	@ Rochester Knighthawks	Blue Cross Arena	L 7–10		6,248	4–11
16	April 19, 2014	Philadelphia Wings	Langley Event Centre	L 11–15		2,856	4–12
17	April 25, 2014	@ Edmonton Rush	Rexall Place	L 5–10		7,500	4–13
18	April 26, 2014	Calgary Roughnecks	Langley Event Centre	L 8–14		3,443	4–14

== Roster ==
Vancouver Stealth roster
Active (21-man) roster		Inactive roster	Coaches
Goaltenders: 00 (Canada) Tyler Richards; 33 (Canada) Matt Roik; Defensemen: 2 (Canada) Matt Beers; 23 (Canada) Mike Grimes (A); 6 (Canada) Curtis Hodgson; 28 (Canada) Bill Hostrawser; 3 (Canada) Jeff Moleski; 24 (United States) Chris O'Dougherty; 11 (Canada) Kyle Sorenson (C); 44 (Canada) Nick Weiss	Forwards: 12 (Canada) Cody Bremner; 26 (Haudenosaunee) Brett Bucktooth; 7 (Canada) Tyler Digby; 10 (Canada) Rhys Duch (A); 9 (Canada) Alex Gajic; 22 (Canada) Brett Hickey; 42 (Canada) Lewis Ratcliff; 5 (Canada) Cliff Smith; Transition: 15 (Canada) Ilija Gajic; 19 (Canada) Justin Salt; 91 (Canada) Tyler Garrison	Practice squad: 27 (Canada) Josh Hawkins; 34 (Canada) Neil Tyacke; 17 (Canada) Chris Wardle; Holdout: 21 (United States) Tim Henderson; Unable to play: 32 (Canada) Mitch McMichael	Head coach {{{Head Coach}}} Legend: * Suspended list; (C) Captain; (A) Alternate captain; updated 2014-01-07; NLL Transactions

== Transactions ==
=== Trades ===
August 21, 2013	To Vancouver Stealth Ilija Gajic	To Colorado Mammoth Bob Snider

== See also ==
- 2014 NLL season
