= Les Bartley Award (Toronto Rock) =

The Les Bartley Award is an award given annually by the Toronto Rock lacrosse team. The award was established during the 2007 season, and is named in honour of the late Les Bartley, the former GM, head coach, and vice president of the Toronto Rock during their reign as one of the top teams in the National Lacrosse League from 1999 to 2005. The award is given to "the Rock player that best exemplifies Les' emphasis on the importance of character and commitment to the team". The inaugural winner was team captain Jim Veltman.

This award is not to be confused with the similarly named Les Bartley Award, given by the NLL to its Coach of the Year.

== Past winners ==
Season	Winner
2007	Jim Veltman
2008	Bob Watson
2009	Chris Driscoll
2010	Sandy Chapman
2011	Bob Watson
2012	Patrick "Paddy" Campbell
2013	Patrick Merrill
2014	Josh Sanderson
2015	
2016	
2017	Billy Hostrawser
2018	
2019	Damon Edwards
