= Mac Allen =

Canadian lacrosse player

Personal information
- Nationality: Canadian
- Born: June 7, 1985 (age 41)
- Height: 6 ft 2 in (188 cm)
- Weight: 200 lb (91 kg; 14 st 4 lb)

Sport
- Position: Defense
- Shoots: Right
- NLL team Former teams: Rochester Knighthawks; Colorado Mammoth; Edmonton Rush
- MLL teams: Hamilton Nationals

Macdonald Allen (born June 7, 1985) is a lacrosse player for the Colorado Mammoth in the National Lacrosse League and formerly of the Hamilton Nationals of Major League Lacrosse. Allen was a member of the Edmonton Rush from 2007 to 2008 and the Rochester Knighthawks from 2009 to 2010. He was traded along with superstar John Grant, Jr. to Colorado for goaltender Matt Vinc.

Allen and Grant were both named to the 2011 NLL All-Star team.

After three years in Colorado, Allen was signed to an offer sheet by the Rochester Knighthawks prior to the 2014 season.

He played Junior A lacrosse from 2004 to 2006 with the Toronto Beaches of the Ontario Lacrosse Association. Allen played for four years for the Bishop's Gaiters in the CUFLA from 2003 to 2006.

Allen is currently a lawyer and practises general civil and commercial litigation at WeirFoulds LLP in Toronto.

== Statistics ==
=== NLL ===
		Regular Season						Playoffs
Season	Team	GP	G	A	Pts	LB	PIM	GP	G	A	Pts	LB	PIM
2007	Edmonton	14	1	4	5	61	12	--	--	--	--	--	--
2008	Edmonton	5	0	0	0	6	12	--	--	--	--	--	--
2009	Rochester	11	2	5	7	68	50	1	0	0	0	5	0
2010	Rochester	14	1	0	1	56	38	--	--	--	--	--	--
2011	Colorado	13	2	5	7	83	55	1	0	0	0	2	0
NLL totals		57	6	14	20	274	167	2	0	0	0	7	0
