= Scott Self =

Canadian lacrosse player

Personal information
- Born: August 4, 1979 (age 46) Peterborough, Ontario, Canada
- Height: 6 ft 1 in (185 cm)
- Weight: 213 lb (97 kg; 15 st 3 lb)

Sport
- Position: Defense
- Shoots: Right
- NLL draft: 28th overall, 1999; Buffalo Bandits
- NLL team Former teams: New England Black Wolves; Rochester Knighthawks; Chicago Shamrox; Arizona Sting; Buffalo Bandits; New York Saints; Ottawa Rebel; Minnesota Swarm; Edmonton Rush
- Pro career: 2001–2017

Scott Self (born August 4, 1979) is a Canadian former professional box lacrosse player who last played for the New England Black Wolves in the National Lacrosse League.

== Personal life ==
Scott Self who started playing lacrosse when he was seven first picked up the sport when he watched his younger brother, Brad play it. Growing up, Self was very competitive in both hockey and lacrosse. In 1999, Self was drafted by the Buffalo Bandits while he was playing college hockey at the University of Guelph.

== International ==
Scott Self played for team Canada. He won a gold medal with Team Canada at the 2007 ILF World Indoor Lacrosse Championship when they beat the Iroquois Nationals 15-14 in overtime.

== Professional career ==
Scott Self was drafted by the Buffalo Bandits 28th overall in the fourth round of the 1999 NLL Entry Draft, but didn't make an appearance until the 2001 NLL season, where he only made one. After his rookie season, Self was signed by the New York Saints, where he appeared in fifteenth games and recorded eleven points. After the 2002 NLL season, Self was traded to the Ottawa Rebel. In his first season with the Rebel, Self appeared in sixteen games and became a key player to the struggling franchise. After his third season in the NLL, the Ottawa Rebel folded and Scott Self was released into the NLL dispersal draft, where he was drafted third overall by the Arizona Sting. With the Sting, Self went to two NLL Championship games and collected 69 points, 312 loose balls and 64 penalty minutes in 61 games. He also made two appearances to the NLL All-star games as a reserve for the west team during his four-year stretch with the Sting. Despite the Sting's success, the franchise suspended operations in 2007 due to a lack of funds. Because of this, Self once again entered the NLL dispersal draft. This time, he was drafted fourth overall by the Chicago Shamrox. Self had a successful season with the Shamrox, gathering 15 points, 13 penalty minutes, and 100 loose balls and an appearance to the NLL all-star game. But for the third time in his career, the team he was on folded and he would have to enter the NLL dispersal draft, where he went second overall to the Edmonton Rush. After one season with the Rush, he was acquired by the Minnesota Swarm in a trade on July 7, 2009. After his season with the Swarm, he was traded to the Buffalo Bandits, where he would spend his next two and a half seasons with. In his three years with the Bandits, he gathered 33 points, 48 penalty minutes, 187 loose balls and an appearance in the 2012 NLL all-star game, where he replaced Toronto's Colin Doyle who was unable to play due to an injury. During his third season with the Bandits, Self was traded to the Rochester Knighthawks before the trade deadline for Alexander-Kedoh Hill. In his three years with the Knighthawks, he played 45 games and recorded 15 points, 15 penalty minutes and 181 loose balls. He also appeared in two championship games, one of which he won. On October 26, 2016, Self signed with the New England Black Wolves. He retired in 2017 while he was injured.

== Statistics ==
		Regular Season						Playoffs
Season	Team	GP	G	A	Pts	LB	PIM	GP	G	A	Pts	LB	PIM
2001	Buffalo	1	0	0	0	5	2	--	--	--	--	--	--
2002	New York	15	6	5	11	58	6	--	--	--	--	--	--
2003	Ottawa	16	4	9	13	90	15	--	--	--	--	--	--
2004	Arizona	16	3	12	15	71	8	--	--	--	--	--	--
2005	Arizona	13	4	15	19	64	16	3	0	3	3	12	4
2006	Arizona	16	1	17	18	86	8	2	1	1	2	9	0
2007	Arizona	16	3	14	17	91	21	3	2	3	5	11	6
2008	Chicago	16	4	11	15	100	13	--	--	--	--	--	--
2009	Edmonton	16	5	8	13	90	14	--	--	--	--	--	--
2010	Minnesota	16	1	11	12	76	12	1	0	0	0	5	0
2011	Buffalo	15	2	8	10	77	36	2	0	0	0	9	0
2012	Buffalo	16	6	11	17	78	8	1	1	1	2	7	0
2013	Rochester	7	0	1	1	22	3	0	0	0	0	12	4
2014	Rochester	18	1	8	9	106	13	6	1	1	2	21	2
2015	Rochester	18	2	3	5	53	15	4	0	0	0	14	4
	NLL totals	177	33	109	142	811	162	25	5	9	14	100	20
