= Jordan Houtby =

Canadian lacrosse player (born 1991)

- Born: November 1, 1991 (age 33)
- Nationality: Canadian
- Height: 6 ft 3 in (1.91 m)
- Weight: 180 pounds (82 kg)
- Shoots: Right
- Position: Defense
- NLL draft: 22nd overall, 2013; Minnesota Swarm
- NLL team: Georgia Swarm
- MSL team: Brooklin Redmen
- Pro career: 2014–

Jordan Houtby (born November 1, 1991) is a professional lacrosse player with the Georgia Swarm of the National Lacrosse League and the Brooklin Redmen of Major Series Lacrosse. Hailing from St. Catharines, Ontario, Houtby began his Canadian amateur career with the Jr. B St. Catharines Spartans before being called up to the Jr. A St. Catharines Athletics. He played for the Athletics through 2012, when he was traded to the Whitby Warriors for their playoff run. Houtby was drafted 22nd overall in the 2013 MSL Draft by the Brooklin Redmen, and made his debut for the Redmen that summer. Houtby attended Holy Cross Catholic Secondary School in St. Catharines, with whom he won regional championships in 2007 and 2008, and went on to play lacrosse at the Detroit Titans, where he was named MAAC Long Stick Midfield Player of the Year in 2011 and 2012.

Houtby was drafted in the fourth round of the 2013 NLL Draft, and played 6 games during his rookie season. He was re-signed to a one-year contract extension after his rookie campaign.
