= Troy Cordingley =

Canadian lacrosse player and coach

Personal information
- Born: January 9, 1967 (age 59)
- Height: 5 ft 10 in (178 cm)
- Weight: 175 lb (79 kg; 12 st 7 lb)

Sport
- Position: Forward
- Shoots: Right
- NLL teams: Buffalo Bandits; Albany Attack; Rochester Knighthawks
- Pro career: 1993–2001

Troy Cordingley (born January 9, 1967) is an indoor lacrosse coach and former player. The current head coach of the Rochester Knighthawks, Cordingley is one of five NLL coaches with at least 100 career wins.

== Playing career ==
Cordingley played in the NLL from 1993 to 2001, spending his first seven years with the Buffalo Bandits, followed by two seasons with the Albany Attack and one with the Rochester Knighthawks. In nine NLL seasons, he scored 128 goals and 312 points in 87 regular season games and 15 goals and 33 points in 9 playoff games. As a player, he won the NLL Championship in 1993 and 1996 with the Bandits.

Cordingley also played Canadian box lacrosse for the Brampton Excelsiors and Coquitam Adanacs and the Six Nations Chiefs winning four Mann Cups.

== Coaching career ==
Cordingley served as the head coach of the Calgary Roughnecks in 2008 and 2009, finishing with a 19–13 record. From 2010 to 2013, he was the head coach of the Toronto Rock from 2010 to 2013, advancing to the Champion's Cup finals in 2010, and winning the Cup in 2011 During his time in Toronto, Cordingley garnered a 38–26 record. On July 3, 2013, he was hired as head coach of the Buffalo Bandits, replacing the fired Darris Kilgour. He was relieved of his head coaching duties with the Bandits on September 20, 2018, and was reassigned to the Bandits' scouting department. On June 28, 2022, he was hired as the head coach of the Vancouver Warriors.

On June 17, 2026, he was hired by the Rochester Knighthawks to be the new head coach.

Cordingley has won the Les Bartley Award twice, the first time in 2009 with the Roughnecks and again in 2013 with the Rock.

=== NLL head coaching statistics ===
Team	Season	Regular Season				Playoffs				Playoff result
Team	Season	GC	W	L	W%	GC	W	L	W%	Playoff result
Calgary Roughnecks	2008	16	7	9	.438	2	1	1	.500	Lost Division Final (POR)
Calgary Roughnecks	2009	16	12	4	.750	3	3	0	1.000	Won Champions' Cup (NY)
Toronto Rock	2010	16	9	7	.562	3	2	1	.667	Lost Champions' Cup (WSH)
Toronto Rock	2011	16	10	6	.625	3	3	0	1.000	Won Champions' Cup (WSH)
Toronto Rock	2012	16	9	7	.562	2	1	1	.500	Lost Division Final (ROC)
Toronto Rock	2013	16	10	6	.625	1	0	1	.000	Lost Divisional Semifinal (MIN)
Buffalo Bandits	2014	18	8	10	.444	4	2	2	.500	Lost Division Finals (ROC)
Buffalo Bandits	2015	18	11	7	.611	1	0	1	.000	Lost Division Semifinal (ROC)
Buffalo Bandits	2016	18	13	5	.722	4	2	2	.500	Lost NLL Finals (SSK)
Buffalo Bandits	2017	18	6	12	.333	–	–	–	–	Did not qualify
Buffalo Bandits	2018	18	8	10	.444	–	–	–	–	Did not qualify
Vancouver Warriors	2023	18	4	14	.222	–	–	–	–	Did not qualify
Totals:	12	204	107	97	.525	23	14	9	.609	
