= Scott Ranger =

Canadian lacrosse player

Personal information
- Nationality: Canadian
- Born: June 21, 1983 (age 43) Nanaimo, BC, CAN
- Height: 5 ft 10 in (178 cm)
- Weight: 200 lb (91 kg; 14 st 4 lb)

Sport
- Position: Forward
- Shoots: Right
- NLL draft: 7th overall, 2003; San Jose Stealth
- NLL team Former teams: Calgary Roughnecks; San Jose Stealth
- WLA team: Nanaimo Timbermen
- Pro career: 2004–2014

Scott Ranger (born June 21, 1983, in Nanaimo, British Columbia) is a Canadian former professional box lacrosse player who played for the Calgary Roughnecks and San Jose Stealth in the National Lacrosse League.

Ranger was drafted by the San Jose Stealth in 2003, but only played nine games over two seasons. Ranger signed with the Calgary Roughnecks before the 2007 season, and led the team in scoring in his first season.

Ranger is also the team captain for the Victoria Shamrocks in the WLA. Ranger was named league MVP in 2011, and team MVP in both 2011 and 2012, when he led not only his former Nanaimo Timbermen team but the league in scoring.

== Statistics ==
=== NLL ===
Scott Ranger		Regular season									Playoffs								
Season	Team	GP	G	A	Pts	LB	PIM	Pts/GP	LB/GP	PIM/GP	GP	G	A	Pts	LB	PIM	Pts/GP	LB/GP	PIM/GP
2004	San Jose Stealth	4	1	2	3	5	0	0.75	1.25	0.00	–	–	–	–	–	–	–	–	–
2005	San Jose Stealth	5	2	6	8	0	11	1.60	0.00	2.20	–	–	–	–	–	–	–	–	–
2007	Calgary Roughnecks	16	24	19	43	65	15	2.69	4.06	0.94	1	2	1	3	0	0	3.00	0.00	0.00
2008	Calgary Roughnecks	16	27	39	66	55	7	4.13	3.44	0.44	2	3	4	7	4	0	3.50	2.00	0.00
2009	Calgary Roughnecks	15	19	32	51	46	4	3.40	3.07	0.27	3	4	9	13	8	0	4.33	2.67	0.00
2010	Calgary Roughnecks	16	24	27	51	62	11	3.19	3.88	0.69	1	1	1	2	1	2	2.00	1.00	2.00
2011	Calgary Roughnecks	14	29	32	61	42	8	4.36	3.00	0.57	2	4	5	9	5	0	4.50	2.50	0.00
2012	Calgary Roughnecks	16	24	37	61	30	8	3.81	1.88	0.50	1	4	1	5	3	0	5.00	3.00	0.00
2013	Calgary Roughnecks	16	20	33	53	30	4	3.31	1.88	0.25	2	4	1	5	3	0	2.50	1.50	0.00
2014	Calgary Roughnecks	9	6	14	20	21	0	2.22	2.33	0.00	5	5	4	9	4	4	1.80	0.80	0.80
		127	176	241	417	356	68	3.28	2.80	0.54	17	27	26	53	28	6	3.12	1.65	0.35
Career Total:		144	203	267	470	384	74	3.26	2.67	0.51									

GP–Games played; G–Goals; A–Assists; Pts–Points; LB–Loose balls; PIM–Penalty minutes; Pts/GP–Points per games played; LB/GP–Loose balls per games played; PIM/GP–Penalty minutes per games played.
