= Andy Secore =

Personal information
- Nickname: Seeks / The Cat
- Nationality: Haudenosaunee
- Born: April 28, 1984 (age 42) Hamilton, Ontario, Canada
- Height: 5 ft 11 in (180 cm)
- Weight: 210 lb (95 kg; 15 st 0 lb)

Sport
- Position: Forward / Transition
- Shoots: Left
- NLL draft: 20th overall, 2005; Calgary Roughnecks
- NLL teams: Edmonton Rush; Minnesota Swarm; Arizona Sting
- Pro career: 2006–2011

Andy Secore (born April 28, 1984) was a former lacrosse player for the Edmonton Rush in the National Lacrosse League. Additionally, Secore represented the Iroquois Nationals in international competitions. He is a former assistant coach of the Rochester Knighthawks.

== Professional career ==
Andy Secore was drafted 20th overall in the 2005 NLL Daft by the Calgary Roughnecks but never made an appearance for the team. Instead, Secore began his career with the Arizona Sting for his first two seasons before being selected in the NLL 2007 dispersal draft by the Minnesota Swarm, where he signed a one-year contract. In his season with the Swarm he recorded 76 points in just 14 starts and was called to play in the All-Star Game, although he was unable to participate due to an injury. Secore then entered the NLL 2008 dispersal draft after the Sting were unable to re-sign him. He was subsequently drafted second overall by the Edmonton Rush. Secore spent his next three years with the Rush until retiring from the National Lacrosse League.

== International career ==
Secore played for the Iroquois Nationals at the 2011 World Indoor Lacrosse Championship in the Czech Republic. The Nationals earned silver medals after losing to Team Canada in the final.

== Statistics ==
		Regular Season						Playoffs
Season	Team	GP	G	A	Pts	LB	PIM	GP	G	A	Pts	LB	PIM
2006	Arizona	3	0	3	3	6	0	--	--	--	--	--	--
2007	Arizona	14	10	12	22	47	8	3	3	3	6	6	2
2008	Minnesota	14	28	48	76	59	4	1	3	3	6	5	0
2009	Edmonton	16	23	40	63	119	9	--	--	--	--	--	--
2010	Edmonton	16	22	34	56	141	14	1	0	1	1	9	0
2011	Edmonton	12	12	13	25	93	2	--	--	--	--	--	--
	NLL totals	75	95	150	245	255	37	6	9	12	21	14	2
