= Les Bartley Award =

The Les Bartley Award is given annually to the National Lacrosse League head coach of the year. The award was simply called the Head Coach of the Year award until 2004, when the award was renamed in honour of Les Bartley, the most successful coach in NLL history.

This award is distinct from the Les Bartley Award given out by the Toronto Rock.

== Past winners ==
Season	Winner	Team	Win #	Other finalists
2026	Pat Coyle	Colorado Mammoth	1	Ed Comeau, Georgia Swarm Curt Malawsky, Vancouver Warriors
2025	Jimmy Quinlan	Saskatchewan Rush	1	Curt Malawsky, Vancouver Warriors Mike Hasen, Rochester Knighthawks
2024	Glenn Clark	Albany FireWolves	2	Curt Malawsky, Vancouver Warriors; Matt Sawyer, Toronto Rock
2023	Curt Malawsky	Calgary Roughnecks	1	Mike Hasen, Rochester Knighthawks; Tracey Kelusky, Panther City Lacrosse Club
2022	Tracey Kelusky	Panther City Lacrosse Club	1	Matt Sawyer, Toronto Rock; John Tavares, Buffalo Bandits
2021	Season cancelled			
2020	Paul Day	Philadelphia Wings	2	Mike Accursi, Halifax Thunderbirds; Glenn Clark, New England Black Wolves
2019	John Tavares/Rich Kilgour	Buffalo Bandits	1	Curt Malawsky, Calgary Roughnecks; Matt Sawyer, Toronto Rock
2018	Derek Keenan	Saskatchewan Rush	4	Pat Coyle, Colorado Mammoth; Mike Hasen, Rochester Knighthawks
2017	Ed Comeau	Georgia Swarm	2	Derek Keenan, Saskatchewan Rush; Jamie Batley, Vancouver Stealth
2016	Glenn Clark	New England Black Wolves	1	Troy Cordingley, Buffalo Bandits; Derek Keenan, Saskatchewan Rush
2015	John Lovell	Toronto Rock	1	Mike Hasen, Rochester Knighthawks; Derek Keenan, Edmonton Rush
2014	Derek Keenan	Edmonton Rush	3	Mike Hasen, Rochester Knighthawks; Curt Malawsky, Calgary Roughnecks
2013	Troy Cordingley	Toronto Rock	2	
2012	Joe Sullivan	Minnesota Swarm	1	
2011	Mike Hasen	Rochester Knighthawks	1	
2010 (tie)	Derek Keenan	Edmonton Rush	2	
2010 (tie)	Chris Hall	Washington Stealth	1	
2009	Troy Cordingley	Calgary Roughnecks	1	
2008	Adam Mueller	New York Titans	1	
2007	Ed Comeau	Rochester Knighthawks	1	
2006	Derek Keenan	Portland LumberJax	1	
2005	Bob Hamley	Arizona Sting	1	
2004	Paul Day	Rochester Knighthawks	1	
2003	Darris Kilgour	Buffalo Bandits	1	
2002	Bob McMahon	Albany Attack	1	
2001	Tony Resch	Philadelphia Wings	1	
