= Karsen Leung =

Canadian lacrosse player (born 1990)

Karsen Leungj
Personal information
- Nationality: Canadian
- Born: April 21, 1990 (age 36) Victoria, British Columbia, Canada
- Height: 6 ft 0 in (183 cm)
- Weight: 180 lb (82 kg; 12 st 12 lb)

Sport
- Position: Transition
- Shoots: Right
- NLL draft: 10th overall, 2013; Calgary Roughnecks
- NLL team: Calgary Roughnecks
- WLA team: Victoria Shamrocks
- Pro career: 2014–

Karsen Leung (born April 21, 1990, in Victoria, British Columbia) is a Canadian professional box lacrosse transition who played for the Calgary Roughnecks in the National Lacrosse League, wearing #21. He played for Bellarmine University of ECAC Lacrosse League in college.

Leung was named to the 2014 NLL All-Rookie team. He is a finalist for the 2015 National Lacrosse League Transition Player of the Year Award, along with Joey Cupido and Brodie Merrill.

== Statistics ==
=== NLL ===
Karsen Leung		Regular season									Playoffs								
Season	Team	GP	G	A	Pts	LB	PIM	Pts/GP	LB/GP	PIM/GP	GP	G	A	Pts	LB	PIM	Pts/GP	LB/GP	PIM/GP
2014	Calgary Roughnecks	18	11	18	29	93	14	1.61	5.17	0.78	7	1	5	6	31	0	0.86	4.43	0.00
2015	Calgary Roughnecks	17	11	24	35	79	12	2.06	4.65	0.71	4	0	1	1	12	2	0.25	3.00	0.50
		35	22	42	64	172	26	1.83	4.91	0.74	11	1	6	7	43	2	0.64	3.91	0.18
Career Total:		46	23	48	71	215	28	1.54	4.67	0.61									

GP–Games played; G–Goals; A–Assists; Pts–Points; LB–Loose balls; PIM–Penalty minutes; Pts/GP–Points per games played; LB/GP–Loose balls per games played; PIM/GP–Penalty minutes per games played.
