= Mitch Wilde =

Canadian lacrosse player

- Born: June 21, 1991 (age 33); Brooklin, Ontario, Canada
- Height: 6 ft 3 in (1.91 m)
- Weight: 210 pounds (95 kg)
- Shoots: Right
- Position: Transition
- NLL draft: 15th overall, 2013; Buffalo Bandits
- NLL team Former teams: Halifax Thunderbirds; Calgary Roughnecks; Buffalo Bandits; New York Riptide
- MSL team Former teams: Brooklin Redmen; Kitchener-Waterloo Kodiaks
- Pro career: 2014–

Mitchell "Mitch" Wilde (born June 21, 1991) is a Canadian professional box lacrosse player for the Halifax Thunderbirds of the National Lacrosse League and the Kitchener-Waterloo Kodiaks of Major Series Lacrosse. Hailing from Brooklin, Ontario, Wilde attended Donald A. Wilson Secondary School, where he was named MVP of his lacrosse team in 2008 and 2009. He played collegiality at Robert Morris University.

Wilde began his junior career in 2009 with the Clarington Green Gaels of the Ontario Junior B Lacrosse League and was traded to the Orillia Kings in 2010. He played for Junior A Whitby Warriors in 2011 and 2012, winning the Minto Cup in 2011, and was drafted 11th overall in the 2013 MSL draft by the Kodiaks.

Wilde was drafted in the second round of the 2013 NLL Entry Draft by the Buffalo Bandits.
