= Daryl Veltman =

Canadian lacrosse player

Personal information
- Born: September 25, 1985 (age 40) Brampton, Ontario, Canada
- Height: 6 ft 0 in (183 cm)
- Weight: 180 lb (82 kg; 12 st 12 lb)

Sport
- Position: Attack
- Shoots: Left
- NCAA team: Hobart College
- NLL draft: 1st overall, 2008; Boston Blazers
- NLL teams: Calgary Roughnecks; Buffalo Bandits; New England Black Wolves
- Pro career: 2009–2017

Daryl Veltman (born September 25, 1985) is a Canadian former professional lacrosse player. He is currently a member of the New England Black Wolves in the National Lacrosse League.

== High School/College career ==
Veltman attended the Connecticut college-preparatory Salisbury School, before enrolling at Hobart and William Smith Colleges. Veltman played collegiate lacrosse for the Hobart College Statesmen. As a freshman in 2005, he was honored by the ECAC Lacrosse League as "Rookie of the Year." During his freshman season, Veltman led his team in scoring. In all three subsequent seasons, he would continue his team's leading scorer. Veltman was recognized by the conference with ALL-ECAC team honors three times, including first-team recognition as a senior.

== Canadian Box career ==
=== Junior ===
Veltman played junior box lacrosse in the Ontario Lacrosse Association. From 2000 to 2002, Veltman was a member of the Halton Hills Bulldogs in the OLA Junior B Lacrosse League. In 2002, he was named his conference's Most Valuable Player. From 2003 to 2006 he played Junior A lacrosse with the Orangeville Northmen. In 2005, he led the OLA Junior A Lacrosse League in scoring with a career high 102 points.

=== Senior ===
After some controversy about transferring provinces within the Canadian Lacrosse Association, Veltman moved west to British Columbia and joined the Coquitlam Adanacs of the Western Lacrosse Association in 2007. During his rookie season, Veltmen helped the Adanacs to a league championship and their first Mann Cup appearance since 2001.

== Professional career ==
Veltman was selected with the first overall pick by the expansion Boston Blazers of the National Lacrosse League in the 2008 NLL Entry Draft. In his rookie season, Veltman was named Rookie of the Week twice, and was also named Rookie of the Month for both January and February.

Veltman is the nephew of Jim Veltman, former Toronto Rock captain and current Rock advisor and National Lacrosse League all-time loose-ball leader.

On August 8, 2015, Veltman signed a two-year contract with the Buffalo Bandits

== International career ==
In 2003, he represented Team Canada at the Under-19 World Lacrosse Championships, helping his team win the silver medal.

== Statistics ==
=== Hobart College ===
Season	Team	GP	G	A	Pts	GB
2005	Hobart	14	28	22	50	30
2006	Hobart	13	22	9	31	16
2007	Hobart	14	33	11	44	38
2008	Hobart	11	26	11	37	23
Totals		52	109	53	162	107

=== National Lacrosse League ===
		Regular Season						Playoffs
Season	Team	GP	G	A	Pts	LB	PIM	GP	G	A	Pts	LB	PIM
2009	Boston	15	34	43	77	92	2	1	3	4	7	6	0
NLL totals		15	34	43	77	92	2	1	3	4	7	6	0

=== Canadian Lacrosse Association ===
			Regular Season					Playoffs
Season	Team	League	GP	G	A	Pts	PIM	GP	G	A	Pts	PIM
2000	Halton Hills Bulldogs	OLA Jr.B	5	5	4	9	2	1	0	0	0	0
2001	Halton Hills Bulldogs	OLA Jr.B	19	22	25	47	14	7	8	7	15	6
2002	Halton Hills Bulldogs	OLA Jr.B	22	44	49	93	22	8	16	11	27	2
2003	Orangeville Northmen	OLA Jr.A	8	12	19	31	2	13	10	30	40	6
2004	Orangeville Northmen	OLA Jr.A	19	30	47	77	4	9	7	17	24	2
2005	Orangeville Northmen	OLA Jr.A	22	38	64	102	41	13	19	29	48	28
2006	Orangeville Northmen	OLA Jr.A	11	9	23	32	13	11	12	11	23	4
2007	Coquitlam Adanacs	WLA	9	8	11	19	0	9	10	6	16	0
Mann Cup	Coquitlam Adanacs	CLA	--	--	--	--	--	5	5	4	9	4
2009	Coquitlam Adanacs	WLA	10	20	27	47	10	6	4	14	18	6
Junior A Totals			60	89	153	242	60	46	48	87	135	40
Junior B Totals			46	71	78	149	38	16	24	18	42	8
Senior A Totals			19	28	38	66	10	15	14	20	34	6
Mann Cup Totals			--	--	--	--	--	5	5	4	9	4
