= Chris Corbeil =

Canadian lacrosse player

Personal information
- Born: May 22, 1988 (age 38) Mississauga, Ontario, Canada
- Height: 6 ft 3 in (191 cm)
- Weight: 195 lb (88 kg; 13 st 13 lb)

Sport
- Position: Defense
- NLL draft: 15th overall, 2009; Buffalo Bandits
- NLL team Former teams: Saskatchewan Rush; Buffalo Bandits
- MSL team: Brooklin Redmen
- Pro career: 2010–

Chris Corbeil (born May 22, 1988 in Mississauga, Ontario) is a Canadian box lacrosse player for the Toronto Rock in the National Lacrosse League. Corbeil was drafted in the second round (15th overall) in the 2009 NLL Entry Draft by the Buffalo Bandits.

Heading into the 2023 NLL season, Inside Lacrosse ranked Corbeil the #9 best defender in the NLL.

He represented Canada at the 2015 and 2019 World Box Lacrosse Championships, winning gold on both occasions. He was captain of Team Canada for the 2019 tournament.

== Statistics ==
=== NLL ===
		Regular Season						Playoffs
Season	Team	GP	G	A	Pts	LB	PIM	GP	G	A	Pts	LB	PIM
2010	Buffalo	12	3	6	9	81	2	1	0	0	0	12	0
2011	Buffalo	16	5	6	11	121	10	2	0	1	1	19	0
2012	Edmonton	11	3	7	10	53	9	3	1	1	2	12	2
2013	Edmonton	16	9	5	14	107	8	1	0	1	1	6	0
2014	Edmonton	18	17	10	27	137	18	3	1	1	2	13	0
2015	Edmonton	17	7	11	18	94	13	5	1	2	3	24	2
2016	Saskatchewan	18	7	13	20	121	4	4	2	4	6	29	2
2017	Saskatchewan	18	6	13	19	100	4	2	0	2	2	6	0
2018	Saskatchewan	18	7	5	12	97	20	4	3	1	4	21	0
NLL totals		144	64	76	140	911	88	25	8	13	21	142	6
