= Brad Self =

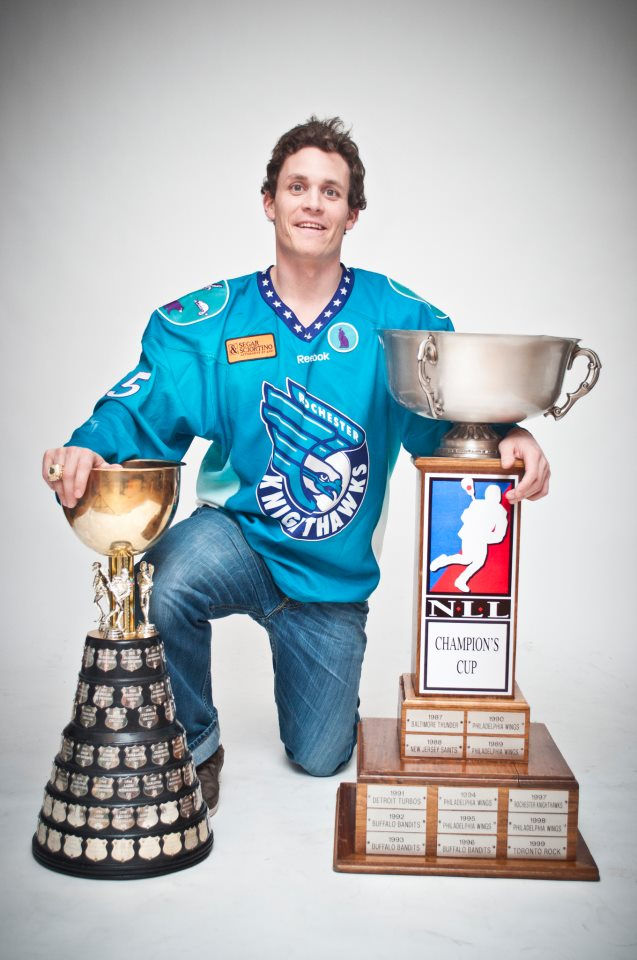
Self with the NLL Champions Cup and the Mann Cup.

Brad Self (born February 27, 1981, in Peterborough, Ontario) is a Canadian retired dual-sport athlete and current lacrosse executive. He is the general manager of the Colorado Mammoth of the National Lacrosse League (NLL).

Self played professional box lacrosse for the Colorado Mammoth and the Peterborough Lakers of Major Series Lacrosse (MSL). Known for his speed and versatility, he was named the NLL Transition Player of the Year in 2016. During his career, he was traded to the Mammoth at the NLL trade deadline and played a key role in several championship runs.

In addition to his lacrosse career, Self also played professional ice hockey in Germany. He was selected by the Buffalo Sabres in the eighth round, 235th overall, of the 1999 NHL Entry Draft.

Self was a member of the Rochester Knighthawks during their championship "three-peat" seasons in 2012, 2013, and 2014. In 2019, he was announced as one of the members of Chaos Lacrosse Club in Paul Rabil's new Premier Lacrosse League (PLL).

Originally from Peterborough, Ontario, Self grew up playing both lacrosse and ice hockey before committing to lacrosse full-time. Following his retirement from professional play, he transitioned into an executive role and now leads the Colorado Mammoth front office.

2012-17 stats	Goals	Assists	GP	Team
2012	7	10	16	Rochester
2013	9	13	16	Rochester
2014	7	18	18	Rochester
2015	6	14	18	Rochester
2016	8	13	15	Rochester
2017	13	23	12	Buffalo
2017 (New Team)	N/A	N/A	N/A	Colorado
