= Edmonton Rush =

NLL professional box lacrosse team in Edmonton, Alberta

- Founded: 2005
- Division: Western
- Team history: Syracuse Smash (1998–2000); Ottawa Rebel (2001–2003)
- Based in: Edmonton, Alberta
- Arena: Rexall Place
- Colours
- Championships: 1 (2015)
- Division titles: 2 (2014, 2015)
- Local media: Shaw TV Edmonton, Global Edmonton, CTV Edmonton, City Edmonton, CBC Edmonton, Edmonton Sun, Edmonton Journal
- Later: Saskatchewan Rush

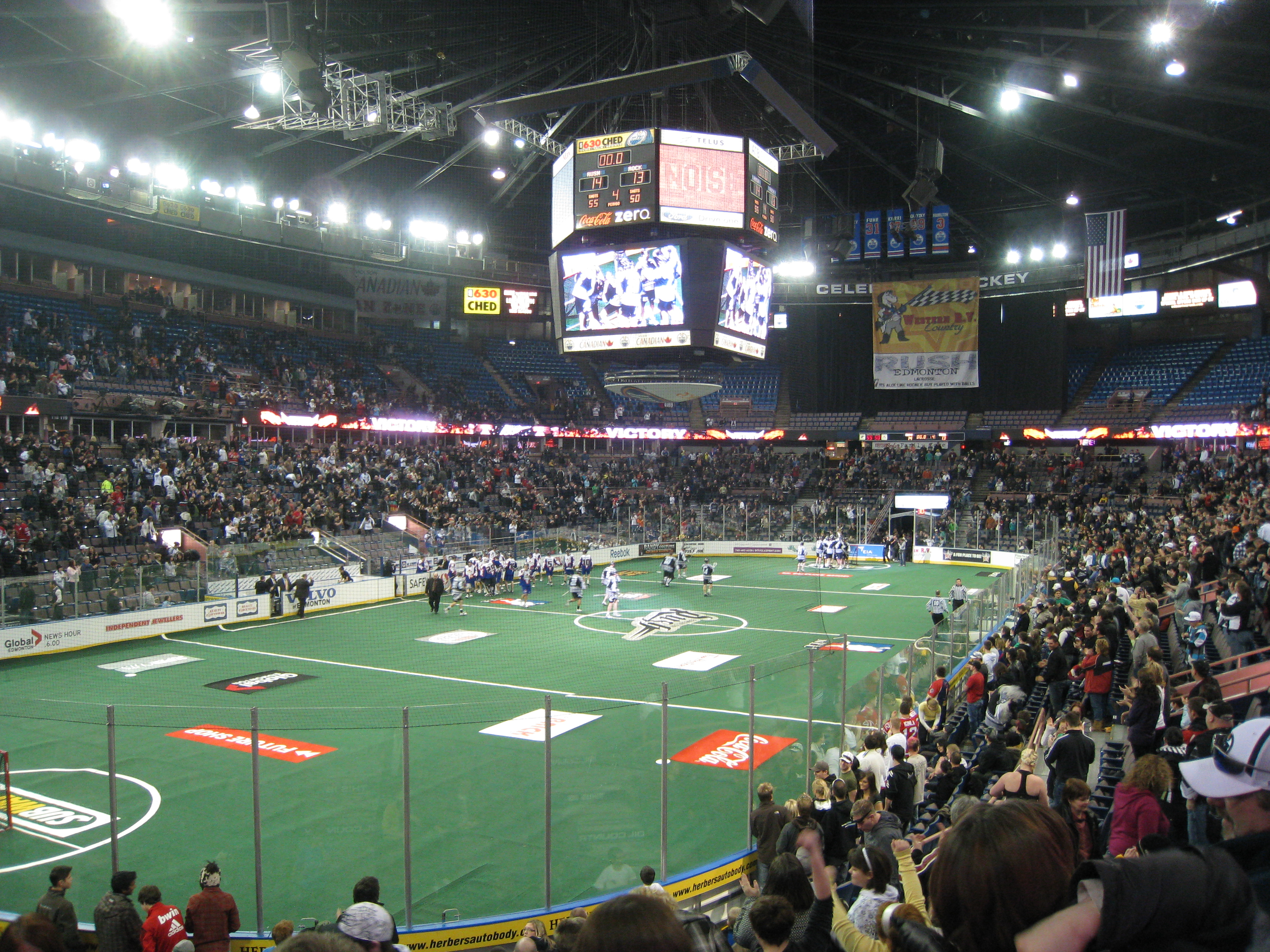
An Edmonton Rush game in Rexall Place (2010)

The Edmonton Rush were a professional lacrosse team in the National Lacrosse League (NLL) that played from the 2006 to 2015 NLL seasons.

The team announced on July 20, 2015, that they would be relocating to Saskatoon, Saskatchewan, for the 2016 season, where they would play at the SaskTel Centre as the Saskatchewan Rush.

== History ==
The NLL announced that Edmonton, Alberta would receive an NLL franchise on May 5, 2005. They played their home games at Rexall Place. The Edmonton team was owned by businessman Bruce Urban, who purchased the dormant Ottawa Rebel to start the Edmonton team. Although early reports suggested that they would be playing as the Edmonton Speed, they selected the name Rush on June 9, 2005.

On February 17, 2006, the Rush recorded the first victory in their franchise history, defeating the Calgary Roughnecks 12–11 in a thrilling game, scoring the winning goal with only 0.2 seconds left in the game. Their first home victory didn't come until their second season, when they defeated the Philadelphia Wings 13–12 on January 6, 2007, in the season opener.

After starting the 2008 NLL season with an 0–5 record, the Rush fired the franchise's original head coach and general manager, Paul Day, and replaced him with former NLL Coach and GM of the Year, Bob Hamley. The Rush finished the season last in the West with a 4–12 record, and after rebuilding much of the team in the off-season, the Rush struggled again in 2009. After finishing last in the West for the second straight season, Hamley was fired.

=== Relocation ===
During Edmonton's playoff run in 2015, Urban began threatening to move the team, telling the Edmonton Sun "It appears that it's coming to an end." After much speculation, the team officially announced they'd be moving to Saskatoon, Saskatchewan to play as the Saskatchewan Rush beginning in 2016. Urban cited the lack of a long-term deal at Rogers Place, which was slated to replace Rexall Place as Edmonton's main arena. Additionally, the Oilers refused to let the Rush put any of their signage at Rexall Place, a move that Urban claimed harmed the Rush's marketing efforts. By the end of the season prior to relocation, the Rush won the Champion's Cup for the first and only time in franchise history, defeating the Toronto Rock 11-10 in Game 2.

== Rivalry with the Calgary Roughnecks ==
The arrival of the Rush created another version of "The Battle Of Alberta". The head coach of the Edmonton Rush however, has come under fire by the Calgary Roughnecks. The Rush took out ads in Calgary newspapers before their first meeting that the Rush would "Open a Can" on the Roughnecks. This proved to backfire as the Roughnecks defeated the Rush in their first meeting. The tactic continued though when the Rush were playing the Toronto Rock, but once again it proved to backfire as the Rock easily won.

However, Calgary tried this tactic against Edmonton before the April 5, 2008 game by taking an ad in the Edmonton Sun saying that Edmonton was a "City of Losers" instead of a city of champions. Just as it had for the Rush, the plan backfired as the Rush won 11–9. The rivalry heated up March 13, 2009 in Edmonton as Calgary built up a 14–3 halftime lead over the Rush. At the one second mark of the 3rd quarter, a line brawl broke out between the two teams resulting in nine fighting majors and nine misconducts. Edmonton did get the upper hand in the first playoff meeting between the teams as the Rush won 11–7 in Calgary on May 1, 2010.

Edmonton had played four games against the Calgary Roughnecks in the 2012 season. The Rush went 0/4 in the regular season when they faced the Calgary Roughnecks. Calgary ended their season with the record of 12–4, while Edmonton dominated the second ever playoff Battle Of Alberta with a win over Calgary 19–11. Edmonton went on to the Western division final against the Minnesota Swarm toward another win, 15–3, and headed to the NLL finals.

== Roster ==
=== Final season’s opening roster ===
Edmonton Rush roster
Active (21-man) roster		Inactive roster	Coaches
Goaltenders: 77 (Canada) Aaron Bold; 30 (Canada) Tyler Carlson; Defensemen: 79 (Canada) Nik Bilic; 24 (Canada) Ryan Dilks; 6 (Canada) John Lintz; 4 (Canada) Kyle Rubisch (A)	Forwards: 17 (Canada) Robert Church; 61 (Canada) Matthew Dinsdale; 88 (Canada) Zack Greer (A); 10 (Canada) Riley Loewen; 42 (Canada) Mark Matthews; 90 (Canada) Ben McIntosh; 27 (Canada) Tyler Melnyk; Transition: 16 (Canada) Chris Corbeil (C); 13 (Canada) Jeff Cornwall; 23 (Canada) Jarrett Davis (A); 33 (Canada) John LaFontaine; 2 (Canada) Brett Mydske (A); 72 (Canada) Adrian Sorichetti; 74 (Haudenosaunee) Jeremy Thompson	Practice squad: 20 (Canada) Mitch Banister (D); 47 (Canada) Matt MacGrotty (D); 35 (Canada) Adam Shute (G); Unable to play: 9 (Canada) Curtis Knight (F); 3 (Canada) Jarrett Toll (D)	Head coach {{{Head Coach}}} Legend: * Suspended list; (C) Captain; (A) Alternate captain; Roster updated 2014-12-18; NLL Transactions

=== Retired numbers ===
Edmonton Rush retired numbers
No.	Player	Position	Career	No. retirement
81	Jimmy Quinlan	F/T	2006–13	January 17, 2014

=== Hall of Famers ===
Name	Position	Seasons played	Year inducted
Dan Stroup	Forward	2007–2008	2010

=== Team captains ===
Name	Seasons served
Andrew Turner	2006–2007
Chris McElroy	2008–2010
Brodie Merrill	2011
Jimmy Quinlan	2012–2013
Chris Corbeil	2014–2015

=== Head coaches ===
#	Name	Term	Regular season				Playoffs			
#	Name	Term	GC	W	L	W%	GC	W	L	W%
1	Paul Day	2005–2008	37	7	30	.289	—	—	—	—
2	Bob Hamley	2008–2009	27	9	18	.333	—	—	—	—
3	Derek Keenan	2010–2015	100	59	41	.590	10	6	4	.600

== All-time record ==
Season	Division	W–L	Finish	Home	Road	GF	GA	Coach	Playoffs	Avg attendance
2006	Western	1–15	6th	0–8	1–7	150	202	Paul Day	Missed playoffs	10,367
2007	Western	6–10	5th	4–4	2–6	160	189	Paul Day	Missed playoffs	10,815
2008	Western	4–12	5th	3–5	1–7	141	197	Paul Day (0–5); Bob Hamley (4–7)	Missed playoffs	8,820
2009	Western	5–11	6th	4–4	1–7	159	200	Bob Hamley	Missed playoffs	8,347
2010	Western	10–6	3rd	5–3	5–3	186	201	Derek Keenan	Lost West Division Final	7,558
2011	Western	5–11	5th	4–4	1–7	175	204	Derek Keenan	Missed playoffs	7,151
2012	Western	6–10	4th	4–4	2–6	167	175	Derek Keenan	Lost NLL Championship	7,050
2013	Western	9–7	3rd	2–6	7–1	203	170	Derek Keenan	Lost in Western Semi-Final	6,714
2014	Western	16–2	1st	8–1	8–1	220	157	Derek Keenan	Lost West Division Final	7,844
2015	Western	13–5	1st	6–3	7–2	241	177	Derek Keenan	Won Championship	6,578
Total	10 seasons	75–89		40–42	35–47	1,802	1,872			8,103
Playoff totals		8–6		3–1	5–5	152	116			9,695

== Playoff results ==
Season	Game	Visiting	Home
2010	West Division Semi-Finals	Edmonton 11	Calgary 7
2010	West Division Finals	Edmonton 11	Washington 12 OT
2012	West Division Semi-Finals	Edmonton 19	Calgary 11
2012	West Division Finals	Edmonton 15	Minnesota 3
2012	NLL Championship	Edmonton 6	Rochester 9
2013	West Division Semi-Finals	Edmonton 11	Washington 12
2014	West Division Finals Game 1	Edmonton 11	Calgary 12 OT
2014	West Division Finals Game 2	Calgary 13	Edmonton 15
2014	West Division Finals Tiebreaker	Calgary 2	Edmonton 1
2015	West Division Finals Game 1	Calgary 8	Edmonton 10
2015	West Division Finals Game 2	Edmonton 9	Calgary 12
2015	West Division Finals Tiebreaker	Edmonton 4	Calgary 1
2015	NLL Championship Game 1	Edmonton 15	Toronto 9
2015	NLL Championship Game 2	Toronto 10	Edmonton 11

== Franchise scoring leaders ==
These are the top-ten point-scorers in franchise history. Figures are updated after each completed NLL regular season.

Note: Pos = Position; GP = Games Played; G = Goals; A = Assists; Pts = Points; P/G = Points per game; G/G = Goals per game; A/G = Assists per game; * = current Rush player

Points
Player	Pos	GP	G	A	Pts	P/G
Ryan Ward	F	64	96	168	264	4.13
Mark Matthews*	F	52	122	140	262	5.04
Zack Greer*	F	72	142	105	247	3.43
Jimmy Quinlan	F/T	127	100	119	219	1.72
Corey Small	F	64	88	129	217	3.39
Robert Church*	F	34	58	86	144	4.24
(Haudenosaunee) Andy Secore	F	44	57	87	144	3.27
Jarrett Davis*	F	51	45	95	140	2.75
Cory Conway*	F	42	27	103	130	3.10
Curtis Knight*	F	34	54	64	118	3.47

Goals
Player	Pos	G	G/G
Zack Greer*	F	142	1.97
Mark Matthews*	F	122	2.35
Jimmy Quinlan	F/T	100	0.79
Ryan Ward	F	96	1.50
Corey Small	F	88	1.38
Robert Church*	F	58	1.71
(Haudenosaunee) Andy Secore	F	57	1.30
Curtis Knight*	F	54	1.59
Scott Evans	F	50	2.00
Dan Stroup	F	50	1.56

Assists
Player	Pos	A	A/G
Ryan Ward	F	168	2.63
Mark Matthews*	F	140	2.69
Corey Small	F	129	2.02
Jimmy Quinlan	F/T	119	0.94
Zack Greer*	F	105	1.46
Cory Conway*	F	103	2.56
Jarrett Davis*	F	95	1.86
(Haudenosaunee) Andy Secore	F	87	1.98
Robert Church*	F	86	2.53
Brodie Merrill	T	74	2.31

== Team records ==
Single season goals - Mark Matthews, 53 (2015)
Assists - Mark Matthews, 62 (2015)
Points - Mark Matthews, 114 (2015)
PIM - Jamie Floris, 67 (2009)
Loose balls - Brodie Merrill, 190 (2010)
Forced turnovers - Kyle Rubisch, 61 (2014)

== NLL awards ==
Champion's Cup

- 2015

Finals MVP

- Mark Matthews: 2015

Rookie of the Year Award

- Mark Matthews: 2013
- Ben McIntosh: 2015

Defensive Player of the Year Award

- Kyle Rubisch: 2012, 2013, 2014, 2015

Transition Player of the Year Award

- Brodie Merrill: 2010

Les Bartley Award

- Derek Keenan: 2010, 2014

GM of the Year Award

- Derek Keenan: 2010, 2014

== See also ==
- Edmonton Rush seasons
