= List of National Lacrosse League records =

This article lists all-time records for the National Lacrosse League, as well as the predecessors Major Indoor Lacrosse League and Eagle Pro Box Lacrosse League.

== Franchise records ==
Through the end of the 2025–26 season

=== All time records ===
==== Championships won ====
Rank	Franchise	Titles	Years
1	Buffalo Bandits	7	1992, 1993, 1996, 2008, 2023, 2024, 2025
1	Toronto Rock	7	1999, 2000, 2002, 2003, 2005, 2011, 2026
2	Philadelphia Wings	6	1989, 1990, 1994, 1995, 1998, 2001
3	Rochester Knighthawks	5	1997, 2007, 2012, 2013, 2014
4	Saskatchewan Rush	3	2015, 2016, 2018
4	Calgary Roughnecks	3	2004, 2009, 2019
4	Colorado Mammoth	3	1987, 2006, 2022

==== Championship appearances ====
Rank	Franchise	Appearances
1	Buffalo Bandits	14
2	Toronto Rock	10
3 (tied)	Colorado Mammoth	6
3 (tied)	Saskatchewan Rush	6
4 (tied)	Vancouver Warriors	4
4 (tied)	Calgary Roughnecks	4

==== Playoff appearances ====
Rank	Franchise	Playoffs
1	Buffalo Bandits	27
2	Toronto Rock	21
3	Rochester Knighthawks	20
4 (tied)	Calgary Roughnecks	19
4 (tied)	Colorado Mammoth	19
5	Philadelphia Wings	18

==== Overall record ====
Minimum 50 games played

Rank	Franchise	W	L	Pct
1	Buffalo Bandits	303	200	.602
2	Toronto Rock	266	185	.590
3	San Diego Seals	70	50	.583
4	Halifax Thunderbirds	274	206	.571
5	Calgary Roughnecks	217	183	.543

==== Season records ====
Record	Franchise	Record	Year
Most Goals Scored	Georgia Swarm	266	2017
Most Goals per Game	Buffalo Bandits	20.13	1992
Fewest Goals Scored	New England Blazers	70	1989
Fewest Goals per Game	Charlotte Cobras	8.50	1996
Most Goals Allowed	Vancouver Stealth	277	2018
Most Goals All. per Game	Charlotte Cobras	18.60	1996
Fewest Goals Allowed	New Jersey Saints	75	1987
Fewest Goals All. per Game	Boston Blazers	8.72	2011

=== Streaks ===
==== Longest winning streaks ====
Rank	Franchise	Wins	Dates
1	Buffalo Bandits	22	February 8, 1992 - February 5, 1994
2 (tied)	Rochester Knighthawks	16	January 20, 2007 - January 11, 2008
2 (tied)	Buffalo Bandits	16	March 30, 2024 - February 14, 2025
3	Edmonton Rush	14	December 28, 2013 - April 5, 2014

=== Longest losing streaks ===
Rank	Franchise	Losses	Dates
1	Ottawa Rebel	13	April 15, 2000 - March 19, 2001
2	Charlotte Cobras	10	January 12, 1996 - March 23, 1996
2	Syracuse Smash	10	January 8, 2000 - April 1, 2000

== Player records ==
Through the end of the 2025–26 season

=== All time leaderboards ===
Players listed in bold are still active

==== Games played ====
As of April 18, 2026

Rank	Player	Games
1	Dan Dawson	322
2	**Matt Vinc**	321
3	John Tavares	306
4	**Ryan Benesch**	302
5	**Paul Dawson**	302
6	**Ian Llord**	283
7	Mike Poulin	283
8	Brodie Merrill	280
9	Derek Suddons	274
10	Shawn Evans	270

==== Goals ====
Rank	Player	Goals
1	John Tavares	815
2	John Grant, Jr.	668
3	Gary Gait	635
4	**Curtis Dickson**	619
5	**Ryan Benesch**	594
6	Dane Dobbie	574
7	Dan Dawson	551
8	Colin Doyle	527
9	Callum Crawford	498
10	Shawn Evans	479

==== Average goals per game ====
Minimum 50 games required

Rank	Player	Goals/Game
1	Gary Gait	3.21
2	Paul Gait	3.20
3	John Grant, Jr.	2.97
4	Tom Marechek	2.73
5	John Tavares	2.71

==== Assists ====
Rank	Player	Assists
1	Dan Dawson	954
2	John Tavares	934
3	Josh Sanderson	908
4	**Dhane Smith**	886
5	Shawn Evans	879
6	Colin Doyle	857
7	**Ryan Benesch**	803
8	Callum Crawford	794
9	John Grant Jr.	778
10	**Mark Matthews**	736

==== Average assists per game ====
Minimum 50 games required

Rank	Player	Assists/Game
1	Garrett Billings	4.04
2	Gavin Prout	3.38
3	Josh Sanderson	3.32
3	John Grant Jr.	3.32
5	Colin Doyle	3.21

==== Total points ====
Rank	Player	Points
1	John Tavares	1,749
2	Dan Dawson	1,505
3	John Grant, Jr.	1,446
4	**Ryan Benesch**	1,397
5	Colin Doyle	1,384
6	Shawn Evans	1,358
7	Josh Sanderson	1,357
8	**Dhane Smith**	1,336
9	Callum Crawford	1,292
10	Dane Dobbie	1,197

==== Faceoff wins ====
Rank	Player	Faceoffs Won
1	**Jay Thorimbert**	3,479
2	**Jeremy Thompson**	2,679
3	**Jake Withers**	2,437
4	Geoff Snider	2,150
5	**Trevor Baptiste**	1,949
6	**Jordan MacIntosh**	1,684
7	**Tyler Burton**	1,583
8	Bob Snider	1,576
9	**Tim Edwards**	1,507
10	Jamie Hanford	1,280

==== Loose balls ====
Rank	Player	Loose Balls
1	Brodie Merrill	2,796
2	Jim Veltman	2,324
3	John Tavares	2,065
4	**Jay Thorimbert**	2,027
5	**Jeremy Thompson**	2,008
6	**Jordan MacIntosh**	1,957
7	Geoff Snider	1,853
8	**Kyle Rubisch**	1,852
9	**Jake Withers**	1,649
10	**Zach Currier**	1,549

==== Penalty minutes ====
Rank	Player	Minutes
1	Billy Dee Smith	685
2	**Matt Beers**	675
3	Shawn Evans	660
4	**Paul Dawson**	647
5	Kyle Laverty	627
6	Brodie Merrill	599
7	**Steve Priolo**	599
8	Geoff Snider	582
9	Patrick Merrill	570
10	**Billy Hostrawser**	564

==== Goalie Saves ====
Rank	Player	Saves
1	**Matt Vinc**	11,823
2	**Nick Rose**	7,704
3	**Dillon Ward**	7,268
4	Anthony Cosmo	7,222
5	Bob Watson	6,471
6	Pat O'Toole	6,464
7	Dallas Eliuk	6,356
8	Mike Poulin	6,305
9	**Frank Scigliano**	5,627
10	Aaron Bold	5,610

=== Season records ===
Record	Player	Record	Year
Most Goals	Dhane Smith	72	2016
Most Goals per Game	Gary Gait	4.75	1998
Most Assists	Dhane Smith	103	2025
Most Assists per Game	Dhane Smith	5.72	2025
Most Points	Dhane Smith	137	2016
Most Points per Game	John Grant, Jr.	8.29	2012
Most Loose Balls	Jake Withers	282	2024
Most Loose Balls per game	Jim Veltman	16.25	1994
Most Penalty Minutes	Rory Smith	104	2010
Most Penalty Minutes per game	Tony Millon / Brian Reese	7.00	2000 / 2001
Most Face-Offs Won	Trevor Baptiste	362	2019
Most Face-Offs Won per game	Bob Snider	19.94	2012
Most Saves	Zach Higgins	757	2024
Most Saves per Game	Anthony Cosmo	41.78	2014

=== Single game records ===
Record	Date	Player	Team	Opponent	Record
Most Goals	January 9, 1999	Gary Gait	Baltimore Thunder	Toronto Rock	10
Most Goals	March 26, 1994	Paul Gait	Philadelphia Wings	Boston Blazers	10
Most Assists	February 14, 2009	Mark Steenhuis	Buffalo Bandits	Toronto Rock	13
Most Points	February 14, 2009	Mark Steenhuis	Buffalo Bandits	Toronto Rock	17

== Attendance records ==
Through May 17, 2026

=== All time records ===
==== Total attendance ====
As of April 18, 2026

Rank	Franchise	Attendance	Home Games
1	Buffalo Bandits	3,497,369	253
2	Colorado Mammoth	2,715,591	193
3	Toronto Rock	2,532,378	218
4	Calgary Roughnecks	2,213,914	200
5	Rochester Knighthawks	1,498,479	189

==== Average attendance ====
As of April 18, 2026

Rank	Franchise	Average per game attendance
1	Colorado Mammoth	14,070
2	Buffalo Bandits	13,824
3	Toronto Rock	11,616
4	Calgary Roughnecks	11,070
5	Saskatchewan Rush	10,477

=== Regular season records ===
Record	Franchise	Record	Year
Most Fans, Season	Buffalo Bandits	166,238	2025
Highest Average, Season	Buffalo Bandits	18,471	2025
Fewest Fans, Season	Charlotte Cobras	13,802	1996
Lowest Average, Season	Syracuse Smash	2,660	2000

=== Game records ===
==== Highest attendance ====
Rank	Date	Home team	Score	Road team	Score	Attendance
1	May 12, 2005	Toronto Rock	19	Arizona Sting	13	19,432
2	April 27, 2001	Toronto Rock	8	Philadelphia Wings	9	19,409
3	May 7, 2004	Calgary Roughnecks	14	Buffalo Bandits	11	19,289
3	April 20, 2019	Calgary Roughnecks	18	Saskatchewan Rush	8	19,289
4	April 20, 2013	Buffalo Bandits	10	Rochester Knighthawks	9	19,070
4	April 26, 2014	Buffalo Bandits	14	Rochester Knighthawks	16	19,070
4	April 30, 2016	Buffalo Bandits	17	New England Black Wolves	12	19,070
4	April 28, 2018	Buffalo Bandits	13	Rochester Knighthawks	15	19,070
4	April 13, 2024	Buffalo Bandits	14	Calgary Roughnecks	7	19,070
4	May 18, 2024	Buffalo Bandits	15	Albany FireWolves	13	19,070
4	December 28, 2024	Buffalo Bandits	13	Rochester Knighthawks	6	19,070
4	March 8, 2025	Buffalo Bandits	11	Calgary Roughnecks	17	19,070
4	March 29, 2025	Buffalo Bandits	12	Vancouver Warriors	13	19,070
4	April 12, 2025	Buffalo Bandits	15	Halifax Thunderbirds	12	19,070
4	May 24, 2025	Buffalo Bandits	15	Saskatchewan Rush	6	19,070
4	November 29, 2025	Buffalo Bandits	15	Georgia Swarm	11	19,070
4	January 3, 2026	Buffalo Bandits	15	Las Vegas Desert Dogs	13	19,070
4	February 7, 2026	Buffalo Bandits	11	Philadelphia Wings	13	19,070
4	March 13, 2026	Buffalo Bandits	13	Colorado Mammoth	10	19,070
4	April 11, 2026	Buffalo Bandits	12	Rochester Knighthawks	6	19,070

==== Lowest attendance ====
Rank	Date	Home team	Score	Road team	Score	Attendance
1	April 13, 2008	San Jose Stealth	14	Edmonton Rush	6	1,437
2	December 31, 2000	Washington Power	13	Toronto Rock	12	1,778
3	December 17, 2022	Panther City Lacrosse Club	9	Colorado Mammoth	12	1,842
4	February 13, 2000	Syracuse Smash	13	New York Saints	15	1,846
5	March 31, 2000	Syracuse Smash	6	Albany Attack	17	1,873

== Other records ==
Record	Date	Home team	Score	Road team	Score
Most goals, both teams	November 21, 2002	Calgary Roughnecks	17	Montreal Express	32
Most goals, one team	November 21, 2002	Calgary Roughnecks	17	Montreal Express	32
Fewest goals, both teams	April 25, 2025	Buffalo Bandits	5	San Diego Seals	4
Fewest goals, both teams	January 11, 2001	Toronto Rock	7	Albany Attack	4
Fewest goals, one team	December 5, 2025	Halifax Thunderbirds	11	Oshawa FireWolves	2
Fewest goals, one team	April 4, 2015	Rochester Knighthawks	10	Minnesota Swarm	2
Fewest goals, one team	April 16, 1999	Toronto Rock	13	Philadelphia Wings	2
