= 2026 San Diego Seals season =

American lacrosse team season

2026 San Diego Seals
- League: NLL
- 2026 record: 8-10
- Home record: 3-6
- Road record: 5-4
- Goals for: 185
- Goals against: 191
- General Manager: Patrick Merrill
- Coach: Patrick Merrill
- Captain: Wesley Berg
- Arena: Pechanga Arena
- Average attendance: 6,615

Team leaders
- Goals: Tre Leclaire
- Assists: Wesley Berg
- Points: Wesley Berg
- Penalties in minutes: Graydon Bradley
- Loose Balls: Zach Currier

The San Diego Seals are a professional box lacrosse team based in San Diego, California playing in the National Lacrosse League (NLL). The 2026 season was their seventh season in the NLL.

The Seals ended the regular season and entered the playoffs with the seventh overall ranking. They lost to the Toronto Rock in the Quarterfinals.

== Regular season ==
Zach Currier won the Transition Player of the Year Award.

=== Standings ===
P	Team	GP	W	L	PCT	GB	Home	Road	GF	GA	Diff	GF/GP	GA/GP
1	Vancouver Warriors – xz	18	13	5	.722	0.0	6–3	7–2	200	170	+30	11.11	9.44
2	Colorado Mammoth – x	18	12	6	.667	1.0	7–2	5–4	206	179	+27	11.44	9.94
3	Saskatchewan Rush – x	18	12	6	.667	1.0	7–2	5–4	206	176	+30	11.44	9.78
4	Georgia Swarm – x	18	12	6	.667	1.0	5–4	7–2	193	156	+37	10.72	8.67
5	Buffalo Bandits – x	18	11	7	.611	2.0	6–3	5–4	199	183	+16	11.06	10.17
6	Toronto Rock – x	18	11	7	.611	2.0	6–3	5–4	195	186	+9	10.83	10.33
7	San Diego Seals – x	18	8	10	.444	5.0	3–6	5–4	185	191	−6	10.28	10.61
8	Halifax Thunderbirds – x	18	8	10	.444	5.0	4–5	4–5	187	182	+5	10.39	10.11
9	Las Vegas Desert Dogs	18	8	10	.444	5.0	6–3	2–7	219	229	−10	12.17	12.72
10	Ottawa Black Bears	18	8	10	.444	5.0	4–5	4–5	185	203	−18	10.28	11.28
11	Calgary Roughnecks	18	6	12	.333	7.0	3–6	3–6	187	205	−18	10.39	11.39
12	Rochester Knighthawks	18	6	12	.333	7.0	3–6	3–6	205	239	−34	11.39	13.28
13	Oshawa FireWolves	18	6	12	.333	7.0	4–5	2–7	179	212	−33	9.94	11.78
14	Philadelphia Wings	18	5	13	.278	8.0	3–6	2–7	165	200	−35	9.17	11.11

== Game log ==
The Seals' schedule was released on September 19, 2025.

Game	Date	Opponent	Location	Score	OT	Attendance	Record
1	November 29, 2025	@ Ottawa Black Bears	Canadian Tire Centre	W 16–13		4,387	1–0
2	December 14, 2025	Rochester Knighthawks	Pechanga Arena	L 7–15		7,662	1–1
3	January 3, 2026	Calgary Roughnecks	Pechanga Arena	L 11–15		9,675	1–2
4	January 9, 2026	Toronto Rock	Pechanga Arena	L 7–12		4,584	1–3
5	January 16, 2026	@ Vancouver Warriors	Rogers Arena	W 11–9		10,971	2–3
6	January 23, 2026	@ Philadelphia Wings	Xfinity Mobile Arena	W 9–7		6,313	3–3
7	January 30, 2026	Philadelphia Wings	Pechanga Arena	W 13–7		6,540	4–3
8	February 7, 2026	Saskatchewan Rush	Pechanga Arena	L 9–12		4,729	4–4
9	February 14, 2026	@ Oshawa FireWolves	Tribute Communities Centre	W 13–7		5,418	5–4
10	February 21, 2026	Halifax Thunderbirds	Pechanga Arena	W 9–8		4,992	6–4
11	February 27, 2026	@ Colorado Mammoth	Ball Arena	L 12–14		10,041	6–5
12	March 1, 2026	Vancouver Warriors	Pechanga Arena	L 7–9		5,784	6–6
13	March 14, 2026	@ Saskatchewan Rush	SaskTel Centre	L 9–10		6,715	6–7
14	March 21, 2026	@ Buffalo Bandits	Pechanga Arena	L 8–9	OT	6,034	6–8
15	April 4, 2026	@ Toronto Rock	TD Coliseum	L 5–7		7,897	6–9
16	April 12, 2026	@ Georgia Swarm	Gas South Arena	W 9–7		5,532	7–9
17	April 17, 2026	Las Vegas Desert Dogs	Pechanga Arena	W 14–12		9,542	8–9
18	April 18, 2026	@ Las Vegas Desert Dogs	Lee's Family Forum	L 16–18		5,825	8–10

=== Playoffs ===
Game	Date	Opponent	Location	Score	OT	Attendance	Record
1	April 25, 2026	@ Colorado Mammoth	Ball Arena	W 13–12	OT	8,991	1–0
2	May 1, 2026	@ Toronto Rock	TD Coliseum	L 7–14		5,541	1–1
3	May 3, 2026	Toronto Rock	Pechanga Arena	W 11–6		5,643	2–1
4	May 9, 2026	@ Toronto Rock	TD Coliseum	L 8–14		5,263	2–2

Against the Colorado Mammoth, Tre Leclaire scored the game-winning goal in overtime, however he had received a pass from Wesley Berg after exiting the crease, which violated League Rules 67.3 and 17.81. A day later, NLL commissioner Brett Frood released a statement that said the goal should have been disallowed and possession awarded to Colorado, and the officials working the game were suspended for the remainder of the playoffs.

== Roster ==
San Diego Seals roster
Active (21-man) roster		Inactive roster	Coaches
Goaltenders: 31 (Canada) Chris Origlieri; 80 (Canada) Cameron Dunkerley; Defensemen: 10 (Canada) Kellen LeClair; 15 (Canada) Graydon Bradley; 20 (United States) Matt Wright; 22 (Canada) James Barclay; 23 (Canada) Zack Deaken; 25 (United States) Eli Gobrecht; 26 (Canada) Patrick Shoemay	Forwards: 14 (Canada) Wesley Berg (C); 33 (Canada) Tre Leclaire; 43 (Canada) Corey Small; 45 (Canada) Dylan Watson; 55 (Canada) Noah Armitage; 88 (United States) Jake Govett; 90 (Canada) Ben McIntosh; 96 (Canada) Connor Robinson; Transition: 9 (United States) Trevor Baptiste; 18 (Canada) Trent DiCicco; 77 (Canada) Zach Currier; 93 (Canada) Ari Steenhuis	Practice squad: 12 (United States) Aidan Carroll; 24 (United States) Marquez White; 72 (Canada) Tyden Redlick; Injured reserve: 21 (Canada) Cam Acchione; 51 (United States) Pat Kavanagh; 91 (United States) Danny Logan; Unable to play: 50 (United States) Chris Kavanagh	Head coach: Patrick Merrill; Assistant coaches: Jordan Hall; Cam Woods; Legend: * Suspended list; (C) Captain; (A) Alternate captain; updated 2026-1-11; NLL Transactions

=== Entry Draft ===
The 2025 NLL Entry Draft was held on September 6, 2025. The Seals' selections are listed below.

Round	Overall	Player	College - Club
1	18	Ari Steenhuis	St. Catharines Athletics Jr. A
2	25	Chris Kavanagh	Notre Dame
4	51	Coulter Mackesy	Princeton
4	54	Ben Ramsey	Notre Dame
5	68	Eddie Qu	Yale
