= 2025 San Diego Seals season =

Lacrosse team season

2025 San Diego Seals
- League: NLL
- 2025 record: 9-9
- Home record: 6-3
- Road record: 3-6
- Goals for: 215
- Goals against: 209
- General Manager: Patrick Merrill
- Coach: Patrick Merrill
- Captain: Wesley Berg
- Arena: Pechanga Arena
- Average attendance: 5,229

Team leaders
- Goals: Wesley Berg
- Assists: Rob Hellyer
- Points: Rob Hellyer
- Penalties in minutes: Trent DiCicco
- Loose Balls: Zach Currier

The San Diego Seals are a box lacrosse team based in San Diego, California, playing in the National Lacrosse League (NLL). The 2025 season was their sixth season in the NLL.

The Seals ended the regular season and entered the playoffs with the eighth overall ranking. They lost to the Buffalo Bandits in the Quarterfinals.

== Regular season ==
NLL Standings Reference:

P	Team	GP	W	L	PCT	GB	Home	Road	GF	GA	Diff	GF/GP	GA/GP
1	Buffalo Bandits – xz	18	13	5	.722	0.0	6–3	7–2	242	195	+47	13.44	10.83
2	Saskatchewan Rush – x	18	13	5	.722	0.0	6–3	7–2	213	179	+34	11.83	9.94
3	Halifax Thunderbirds – x	18	11	7	.611	2.0	6–3	5–4	239	213	+26	13.28	11.83
4	Vancouver Warriors – x	18	11	7	.611	2.0	7–2	4–5	196	172	+24	10.89	9.56
5	Rochester Knighthawks – x	18	10	8	.556	3.0	4–5	6–3	228	209	+19	12.67	11.61
6	Calgary Roughnecks – x	18	10	8	.556	3.0	3–6	7–2	219	209	+10	12.17	11.61
7	Georgia Swarm – x	18	9	9	.500	4.0	4–5	5–4	214	217	−3	11.89	12.06
8	San Diego Seals – x	18	9	9	.500	4.0	6–3	3–6	215	209	+6	11.94	11.61
9	Ottawa Black Bears	18	8	10	.444	5.0	4–5	4–5	183	202	−19	10.17	11.22
10	Colorado Mammoth	18	8	10	.444	5.0	4–5	4–5	195	212	−17	10.83	11.78
11	Albany FireWolves	18	7	11	.389	6.0	5–4	2–7	192	209	−17	10.67	11.61
12	Philadelphia Wings	18	7	11	.389	6.0	4–5	3–6	207	231	−24	11.50	12.83
13	Toronto Rock	18	6	12	.333	7.0	2–7	4–5	189	208	−19	10.50	11.56
14	Las Vegas Desert Dogs	18	4	14	.222	9.0	2–7	2–7	189	256	−67	10.50	14.22

== Game log ==
The Seals' schedule was released on September 17, 2024.

Game	Date	Opponent	Location	Score	OT	Attendance	Record
1	December 1, 2024	Philadelphia Wings	Pechanga Arena	W 18–15		5,527	1–0
2	December 7, 2024	@ Georgia Swarm	Gas South Arena	L 12–13	OT	4,358	1–1
3	December 13, 2024	Colorado Mammoth	Pechanga Arena	W 14–11		3,611	2–1
4	December 21, 2024	Georgia Swarm	Pechanga Arena	L 8–11		3,645	2–2
5	January 4, 2025	Ottawa Black Bears	Pechanga Arena	W 6–5		5,000	3–2
6	January 10, 2025	@ Vancouver Warriors	Rogers Arena	L 9–11		9,551	3–3
7	January 18, 2025	@ Las Vegas Desert Dogs	Lee's Family Forum	L 10–12		5,597	3–4
8	February 1, 2025	Saskatchewan Rush	Pechanga Arena	L 8–12		4,578	3–5
9	February 8, 2025	@ Toronto Rock	Paramount Fine Foods Centre	W 11–10		5,030	4–5
10	February 15, 2025	@ Buffalo Bandits	KeyBank Center	W 14–13	OT	18,224	5–5
11	February 22, 2025	Buffalo Bandits	Pechanga Arena	L 12–13		6,280	5–6
12	March 7, 2025	Vancouver Warriors	Pechanga Arena	W 13–11		4,154	6–6
13	March 16, 2025	Las Vegas Desert Dogs	Pechanga Arena	W 20–11		5,571	7–6
14	March 22, 2025	@ Calgary Roughnecks	Scotiabank Saddledome	W 16–12		11,459	8–6
15	March 29, 2025	@ Rochester Knighthawks	Blue Cross Arena	L 13–14		5,463	8–7
16	April 5, 2025	@ Halifax Thunderbirds	Scotiabank Centre	L 10–13		10,798	8–8
17	April 12, 2025	@ Albany FireWolves	MVP Arena	L 10–12		5,399	8–9
18	April 18, 2025	Albany FireWolves	Pechanga Arena	W 11–10		8,697	9–9

=== Playoffs ===
Game	Date	Opponent	Location	Score	OT	Attendance	Record
NLL Quarterfinals	April 25, 2025	@ Buffalo Bandits	KeyBank Center	L 4–5		17,703	0–1

== Roster ==
San Diego Seals roster
Active (21-man) roster		Inactive roster	Coaches
Goaltenders: 31 (Canada) Chris Origlieri; 30 (Canada) Mike Poulin; Defensemen: 2 (Canada) Drew Belgrave; 15 (Canada) Graydon Bradley; 23 (Canada) Zack Deaken; 25 (United States) Eli Gobrecht; 19 (Canada) Cam Holding (A); 7 (Canada) Jesse Gamble; 10 (Canada) Kellen LeClair; 91 (United States) Danny Logan; 4 (Canada) Kyle Rubisch; 20 (United States) Matt Wright	Forwards: 21 (Canada) Ryan Benesch; 14 (Canada) Wesley Berg (C); 10 (Canada) Robert Hellyer; 47 (Canada) Kyle Jackson; 90 (Canada) Ben McIntosh; 16 (Canada) Adam Noakes; Transition: 9 (United States) Trevor Baptiste; 77 (Canada) Zach Currier; 33 (Canada) Tre Leclaire	Practice squad: 51 (Canada) Cam Aacchione; 18 (Canada) Trent DiCicco; 88 (United States) Jake Govett; 11 (Canada) Cameron Lumb; 44 (United States) Jacob Power; 26 (Canada) Patrick Shoemay; 13 (Canada) Justin Sykes; 12 (Canada) Matt Sykes; 92 (Canada) Ty Thompson; 32 (Canada) Robbie Turpin; Restricted list: 83 (Haudenosaunee) Austin Staats	Head coach: Patrick Merrill; Assistant coaches: Jordan Hall; Cam Woods; Legend: * Suspended list; (C) Captain; (A) Alternate captain; updated 2024-12-16; NLL Transactions

=== Dispersal Draft ===
On August 30, 2024, the NLL announced that the Panther City Lacrosse Club would cease operations. The league held a dispersal draft on September 2.

Round	Overall	Player
1	11	Justin Sykes
2	25	Callum Crawford

=== Entry Draft ===
The 2024 NLL Entry Draft was held virtually on September 15. The Seals' selections are listed below.

Round	Overall	Player	College - Club
1	9	Trent DiCicco	Ohio State University - Victoria Shamrocks
1	12	Jacob Power	Belmont Abbey College - Nanaimo Timbermen
1	14	Robbie Turpin	Simon Fraser University - Coquitlam Adanacs
3	39	Cam Occhione	University of Delaware - Owen Sound North Stars
3	40	Ethan M'Lot	Burnaby Lakers Jr. A
3	43	Arthur Miller	New Jersey Institute of Technology - Victoria Shamrocks
5	69	Jordy Neary	Port Coquitlam Saints
6	84	Tyden Redlick	Edmonton Miners
