= 2024 San Diego Seals season =

National Lacrosse League season

2024 San Diego Seals
- League: NLL
- 2024 record: 13-5
- Home record: 8-1
- Road record: 5-4
- Goals for: 210
- Goals against: 178
- General Manager: Patrick Merrill
- Coach: Patrick Merrill
- Captain: Wesley Berg
- Arena: Pechanga Arena
- Average attendance: 4,636

Team leaders
- Goals: Austin Staats
- Assists: Wesley Berg
- Points: Wesley Berg
- Penalties in minutes: Austin Staats
- Loose Balls: Trevor Baptiste

The San Diego Seals are a lacrosse team based in San Diego, California. The team plays in the National Lacrosse League (NLL). The 2024 season was their fifth season in the NLL. The season started on December 9, 2022, as a home opener against the Calgary Roughnecks.

On September 13, 2023, before the start of the season, team captain Brodie Merrill announced his retirement from professional lacrosse. His number (#17) was retired at the home opener. Wesley Berg was named as the new team captain. However, on March 15, 2024 it was announced that Merrill would be returning to the active roster, and plans to finish the remainder of the 2024 season on the Seals.

The Seals ended the regular season and entered the playoffs with the second overall ranking. They lost to the Albany FireWolves in the Semifinals.

== Regular season ==
=== Standings ===
P	Team	GP	W	L	PCT	GB	Home	Road	GF	GA	Diff	GF/GP	GA/GP
1	Toronto Rock – xz	18	15	3	.833	0.0	7–2	8–1	218	169	+49	12.11	9.39
2	San Diego Seals – x	18	13	5	.722	2.0	8–1	5–4	210	178	+32	11.67	9.89
3	Albany FireWolves – x	18	11	7	.611	4.0	5–4	6–3	206	191	+15	11.44	10.61
4	Buffalo Bandits – x	18	11	7	.611	4.0	6–3	5–4	237	212	+25	13.17	11.78
5	Georgia Swarm – x	18	10	8	.556	5.0	6–3	4–5	198	197	+1	11.00	10.94
6	Halifax Thunderbirds – x	18	10	8	.556	5.0	6–3	4–5	228	200	+28	12.67	11.11
7	Panther City Lacrosse Club – x	18	9	9	.500	6.0	5–4	4–5	205	202	+3	11.39	11.22
8	Rochester Knighthawks – x	18	8	10	.444	7.0	4–5	4–5	214	226	−12	11.89	12.56
9	New York Riptide	18	8	10	.444	7.0	4–5	4–5	206	234	−28	11.44	13.00
10	Saskatchewan Rush	18	8	10	.444	7.0	4–5	4–5	217	210	+7	12.06	11.67
11	Calgary Roughnecks	18	8	10	.444	7.0	6–3	2–7	198	194	+4	11.00	10.78
12	Vancouver Warriors	18	8	10	.444	7.0	5–4	3–6	202	211	−9	11.22	11.72
13	Philadelphia Wings	18	6	12	.333	9.0	1–8	5–4	198	233	−35	11.00	12.94
14	Las Vegas Desert Dogs	18	5	13	.278	10.0	2–7	3–6	176	223	−47	9.78	12.39
15	Colorado Mammoth	18	5	13	.278	10.0	4–5	1–8	193	226	−33	10.72	12.56

x = clinched playoff berth | z = clinched top overall record

== Scoring leaders ==
Note: GP = Games played; G = Goals; A = Assists; Pts = Points; PIM = Penalty minutes; LB = Loose Balls

Player	GP	G	A	Pts	PIM	LB
Wesley Berg	18	41	67	108	18	96
Austin Staats	18	50	52	102	38	84
Dane Dobbie	18	24	46	70	8	51
Curtis Dickson	13	27	37	64	2	60
Tre Leclaire	18	23	36	59	7	80

== Game log ==
=== Regular season ===
Game	Date	Opponent	Location	Score	OT	Attendance	Record
1	December 9, 2023	Calgary Roughnecks	Pechanga Arena	W 12–9		5,345	1–0
2	December 16, 2023	@ Buffalo Bandits	KeyBank Center	L 9–12		17,200	1–1
3	December 29, 2023	Rochester Knighthawks	Pechanga Arena	W 17–14		4,339	2–1
4	January 12, 2024	@ Las Vegas Desert Dogs	Michelob Ultra Arena	L 8–10		6,203	2–2
5	January 13, 2024	@ Colorado Mammoth	Ball Arena	W 12–8		9,652	3–2
6	January 20, 2024	@ Albany FireWolves	MVP Arena	W 14–7		3,578	4–2
7	January 27, 2024	@ Philadelphia Wings	Wells Fargo Center	W 12–11		8,482	5–2
8	February 4, 2024	Colorado Mammoth	Pechanga Arena	W 16–7		5,354	6–2
9	February 10, 2024	@ New York Riptide	Nassau Coliseum	L 8–10		5,001	6–3
10	February 23, 2024	Georgia Swarm	Pechanga Arena	W 12–11	OT	4,392	7–3
11	March 1, 2024	@ Panther City Lacrosse Club	Dickies Arena	W 10–9	OT	2,654	8–3
12	March 2, 2024	Toronto Rock	Pechanga Arena	L 13–15		4,199	8–4
13	March 9, 2024	Halifax Thunderbirds	Pechanga Arena	W 13–8		4,055	9–4
14	March 15, 2024	@ Calgary Roughnecks	Scotiabank Saddledome	W 7–6		14,143	10–4
15	March 23, 2024	Las Vegas Desert Dogs	Pechanga Arena	W 10–9	OT	5,324	11–4
16	April 5, 2024	Panther City Lacrosse Club	Pechanga Arena	W 14–10		4,075	12–4
17	April 13, 2024	@ Saskatchewan Rush	SaskTel Centre	L 8–13		7,090	12–5
18	April 19, 2024	Vancouver Warriors	Pechanga Arena	W 16–9		4,639	13–5

=== Playoffs ===
Game	Date	Opponent	Location	Score	OT	Attendance	Record
Quarterfinals	April 27, 2024	Panther City Lacrosse Club	Pechanga Arena	W 9–8	OT	4,804	1–0
Semifinals (game 1)	May 3, 2024	Albany FireWolves	Pechanga Arena	L 12–14		5,001	1–1
Semifinals (game 2)	May 5, 2024	@ Albany FireWolves	MVP Arena	L 10–13		4,237	1–2

== Roster ==
San Diego Seals roster
Active (21-man) roster		Inactive roster	Coaches
Goaltenders: 31 (Canada) Chris Origlieri; 30 (Canada) Mike Poulin; Defensemen: 2 (Canada) Drew Belgrave; 15 (Canada) Graydon Bradley; 19 (Canada) Cam Holding (A); 10 (Canada) Kellen LeClair; 91 (United States) Danny Logan; 4 (Canada) Kyle Rubisch; 26 (Canada) Patrick Shoemay	Forwards: 14 (Canada) Wesley Berg (C); 71 (Canada) Curtis Dickson; 44 (Canada) Dane Dobbie; 88 (United States) Jake Govett; 47 (Canada) Kyle Jackson; 34 (United States) Payton Rezanka; 83 (Haudenosaunee) Austin Staats; Transition: 9 (United States) Trevor Baptiste; 7 (Canada) Jesse Gamble; 33 (Canada) Tre Leclaire	Practice squad: 24 (Canada) Matthew Abbott; 41 (United States) Xander Dickson; 25 (United States) Eli Gobrecht; 11 (Canada) Cameron Lumb; 16 (Canada) Adam Noakes; 12 (Canada) Matt Sykes	Head coach: Patrick Merrill; Assistant coaches: Jordan Hall; Cam Woods; Bob Watson; Legend: * Suspended list; (C) Captain; (A) Alternate captain; updated 2023-12-18; NLL Transactions

=== Entry Draft ===
The 2023 NLL Entry Draft took place on September 15, 2023. The Seals made the following selections:

Round	Overall	Player	College/Club
1	13	Matthew Wright	University of North Carolina/Syracuse University- Peterborough
2	23	Ben Stewart	Hofstra University- Burnaby Lakers
2	27	Noah Armitage	Stonybrook University – New West
3	44	Matthew Abbott	Queens University (NC)- Langley Thunder Sr. WLA
4	62	Xander Dickson	University of Virginia
5	76	Marcus Hudgins	Ohio State University
5	80	JJ Sillstrop	University of Denver
6	95	Oscar Hertz	Brown University
