= 2026 Toronto Rock season =

Season of Toronto Rock lacrosse team

2026 Toronto Rock
- National Lacrosse League Cup Champions
- League: National Lacrosse League
- Rank: 6th
- 2026 record: 11–7
- Home record: 6–3
- Road record: 5–4
- Goals for: 195
- Goals against: 186
- General Manager: Jamie Dawick
- Coach: Matt Sawyer
- Captain: Challen Rogers
- Arena: TD Coliseum

The Toronto Rock are a professional lacrosse team based in Hamilton, Ontario playing in the National Lacrosse League (NLL). The 2026 season was the 28th in franchise history, and 27th as the Rock. The Rock returned to playing their home games at the newly renovated TD Coliseum this season, after playing the prior season at the Paramount Fine Foods Centre in Mississauga while their home arena was closed for renovations.

Toronto finished the regular season with an 11–7 record, earning the sixth seed in the playoffs. They went on to win the National Lacrosse League Cup over the Halifax Thunderbirds, winning their seventh championship and the franchise’s first title since 2011, ending a 15 year championship drought.

== Regular season ==
The Rock temporarily relocated their home games to the Paramount Fine Foods Centre in Mississauga, Ontario for the 2024–25 season, as Hamilton's FirstOntario Centre was closed for renovations.

The Rock had a disappointing 2025 season, finishing with a 6–12 record and missing the playoffs, after a franchise best 15–3 regular season record and first place in the league the prior year.

Rookies Sam English and CJ Kirst, drafted 2nd and 1st overall in the 2024 and 2025 NLL Entry Drafts respectively, made their debuts this season. Goaltender Nick Rose, who had been traded the prior year, returned to the team.

The teaam's season opener was against the Oshawa FireWolves, which was the team's first games since relocating from Albany in the offseason. They opened their home season at the newly renovated TD Coliseum on 13 December.

Toronto finished the regular season with an 11–7 record, earning the sixth seed. In the playoffs, they went on to sweap the Halifax Thunderbirds in the finals to win the National Lacrosse League Cup. It was the franchises 7th championship, tied with the Buffalo Bandits for the most in league history.

English won the NLL Finals MPV, while Kirst won the National Lacrosse League Rookie of the Year Award.

=== Standings ===
P	Team	GP	W	L	PCT	GB	Home	Road	GF	GA	Diff	GF/GP	GA/GP
1	Vancouver Warriors – xz	18	13	5	.722	0.0	6–3	7–2	200	170	+30	11.11	9.44
2	Colorado Mammoth – x	18	12	6	.667	1.0	7–2	5–4	206	179	+27	11.44	9.94
3	Saskatchewan Rush – x	18	12	6	.667	1.0	7–2	5–4	206	176	+30	11.44	9.78
4	Georgia Swarm – x	18	12	6	.667	1.0	5–4	7–2	193	156	+37	10.72	8.67
5	Buffalo Bandits – x	18	11	7	.611	2.0	6–3	5–4	199	183	+16	11.06	10.17
6	Toronto Rock – x	18	11	7	.611	2.0	6–3	5–4	195	186	+9	10.83	10.33
7	San Diego Seals – x	18	8	10	.444	5.0	3–6	5–4	185	191	−6	10.28	10.61
8	Halifax Thunderbirds – x	18	8	10	.444	5.0	4–5	4–5	187	182	+5	10.39	10.11
9	Las Vegas Desert Dogs	18	8	10	.444	5.0	6–3	2–7	219	229	−10	12.17	12.72
10	Ottawa Black Bears	18	8	10	.444	5.0	4–5	4–5	185	203	−18	10.28	11.28
11	Calgary Roughnecks	18	6	12	.333	7.0	3–6	3–6	187	205	−18	10.39	11.39
12	Rochester Knighthawks	18	6	12	.333	7.0	3–6	3–6	205	239	−34	11.39	13.28
13	Oshawa FireWolves	18	6	12	.333	7.0	4–5	2–7	179	212	−33	9.94	11.78
14	Philadelphia Wings	18	5	13	.278	8.0	3–6	2–7	165	200	−35	9.17	11.11

== Game log ==
=== Regular season ===
Game	Date	Opponent	Location	Score	OT	Attendance	Record
1	November 28, 2025	@ Oshawa FireWolves	Tribute Communities Centre	L 7–8		5,943	0–1
2	December 13, 2025	Calgary Roughnecks	TD Coliseum	W 11–10		5,706	1–1
3	December 27, 2025	Las Vegas Desert Dogs	TD Coliseum	L 11–17		6,725	1–2
4	January 9, 2026	@ San Diego Seals	Pechanga Arena	W 12–7		4,584	2–2
5	January 17, 2026	@ Rochester Knighthawks	Blue Cross Arena	W 11–10		3,897	3–2
6	January 24, 2026	Georgia Swarm	TD Coliseum	L 9–10	OT	6,774	3–3
7	January 31, 2026	Ottawa Black Bears	TD Coliseum	W 17–10		6,903	4–3
8	February 7, 2026	Oshawa FireWolves	TD Coliseum	W 12–10		6,119	5–3
9	February 14, 2026	@ Colorado Mammoth	Ball Arena	L 8–16		9,363	5–4
10	February 20, 2026	Colorado Mammoth	TD Coliseum	W 13–9		5,747	6–4
11	February 28, 2026	Buffalo Bandits	TD Coliseum	L 9–14		8,960	6–5
12	March 6, 2026	@ Vancouver Warriors	Rogers Arena	W 13–10		9,747	7–5
13	March 13, 2026	@ Halifax Thunderbirds	Scotiabank Centre	W 14–13	OT	10,595	8–5
14	March 20, 2026	Saskatchewan Rush	TD Coliseum	W 13–9		7,477	9–5
15	March 29, 2026	@ Philadelphia Wings	Xfinity Mobile Arena	L 9–12		6,071	9–6
16	April 4, 2026	San Diego Seals	TD Coliseum	W 7–5		7,897	10–6
17	April 10, 2026	@ Ottawa Black Bears	Canadian Tire Centre	W 10–6		5,344	11–6
18	April 18, 2026	@ Saskatchewan Rush	SaskTel Centre	L 9–10	OT	7,761	11–7

=== Playoffs ===
Game	Date	Opponent	Location	Score	OT	Attendance	Record
Quarterfinals	April 25, 2026	@ Saskatchewan Rush	SaskTel Centre	W 16–13		5,653	1–0
Semifinals (game 1)	May 1, 2026	San Diego Seals	TD Coliseum	W 14–12		5,541	2–0
Semifinals (game 2)	May 3, 2026	@ San Diego Seals	Pechanga Arena	L 6–11		5,643	2–1
Semifinals (game 3)	May 9, 2026	San Diego Seals	TD Coliseum	W 14–8		5,263	3–1
Finals (game 1)	May 15, 2026	Halifax Thunderbirds	TD Coliseum	W 13–11		7,812	4–1
Finals (game 2)	May 17, 2026	@ Halifax Thunderbirds	Scotiabank Centre	W 12–7		10,889	5–1

== Roster ==
Toronto Rock roster
Active (21-man) roster		Inactive roster	Coaches
Goaltenders: 92 (Canada) Troy Holowchuk; 35 (Canada) Dante Mancini; 30 (Canada) Steve Orleman; 66 (Canada) Nick Rose; Defensemen: 22 (Canada) Jake Darlison; 81 (United States) Elijah Gash; 16 (Canada) Kobe Handsor; 93 (Canada) Latrell Harris; 91 (Canada) Billy Hostrawser (A); 45 (Canada) Lucas Hucal; 44 (Canada) Josh Jackson; 33 (Canada) Josh Jubenville; 27 (United States) Hugh Kelleher; 20 (Canada) Bradley Kri (A); 24 (Canada) Justin J. Martin; 55 (Canada) Chris Weier	Forwards: 21 (South Africa) Chris Boushy; 25 (Canada) Dan Craig; 8 (Austria) Josh Dawick; 77 (Canada) Owen Hiltz; 5 (Canada) Zack Kearney; 1 (United States) CJ Kirst; 42 (Canada) Mark Matthews; 88 (Canada) Isiah Moran-Weekes; 23 (Canada) Challen Rogers (C); Transition: 15 (Canada) Sam English; 37 (Canada) Robert Hudson; 14 (Canada) Phil Mazzuca; 73 (United States) Nicholas Rowlett		Head coach: Matt Sawyer; Assistant coaches: Bruce Codd; Dan Dawson; Blaine Manning; Brandon Miller; Legend: * Suspended list; (C) Captain; (A) Alternate captain; Roster updated 2026-5-18; NLL Transactions

=== Entry Draft ===
The 2025 NLL Entry Draft took place on September 6, 2025. The Toronto Rock made the following selections:

Round	Overall	Player	Position	College/Club	Notes
1	1	CJ Kirst	F	Mimico Mountaineers Jr. A - Cornell University	Traded from Las Vegas Desert Dogs
1	2	Ty English	F/T	Oakville Rock - University of North Carolina	
1	3	Owen Hiltz	F	Peterborough Lakers (MSL) - Syracuse University	Traded from Philadelphia Wings
2	20	Hugh Kelleher	F	Cornell	
3	35	Isiah Moran-Weekes	F	High Point/Owen Sound North Stars MSL	
5	63	Kobe Handsor	D	Mercer/Brooklin Merchants Sr. B	
6	77	Dakota Eierman		Lehigh	
