= Austin Staats =

Canadian lacrosse player (born 1998)

Personal information
- Nationality: Haudenosaunee
- Born: April 23, 1998 (age 28) Six Nations, Ontario, Canada
- Height: 5 ft 10 in (178 cm)
- Weight: 220 lb (100 kg; 15 st 10 lb)

Sport
- Position: Attack
- Shoots: Left
- NCAA team: Onondaga Community College
- NLL draft: 1st overall, 2018; San Diego Seals
- NLL team: San Diego Seals
- PLL team: Chaos Lacrosse Club
- Pro career: 2019–2024

Career highlights
- NLL: Rookie Of The Year (2019); All-Rookie Team (2019); WLC: Best Attacker (2023 Revoked); 2x All-World Team (2018, 2023 Revoked); U-19 All-World Team (2016); NJCAA: 2x National Champion (2017, 2018); 2x All-American (2017, 2018); OJLL: Minto Cup MVP (2017)
Medal record
Representing Haudenosaunee
Men's box lacrosse
World Indoor Lacrosse Championship
Silver medal – second place	2015 Onondaga Nation
Men's field lacrosse
World Lacrosse Championship
Bronze medal – third place	2018 Netanya
Bronze medal – third place	2023 San Diego
U-19 World Lacrosse Championship
Bronze medal – third place	2016 Coquitlam

Austin Staats (born April 23, 1998) is a Haudenosaunee former professional lacrosse player who played for the San Diego Seals of the National Lacrosse League (NLL), and the Chaos Lacrosse Club of the Premier Lacrosse League (PLL). He was drafted 1st overall by the San Diego Seals in the 2018 NLL Entry Draft. He was known for his aggressive style of play, but his career ended amongst drug use violations, and numerous counts of aggravated assault.

== Early life and education ==
Austin Staats was born April 23, 1998, in Six Nations, Ontario, Canada, where he grew up learning to play lacrosse from his older brother, Randy Staats. By the time Staats graduated from Assumption College High School in 2016, he knew that his grades did not meet the requirements needed to play NCAA Division I lacrosse, so instead followed his brother Randy's steps by attending and playing at Onondaga Community College (OCC).

In July 2016, Staats was named to the Haudenosaunee National Lacrosse team, which he competed for in the 2016 Men's U-19 World Lacrosse Championship in Coquitlam, British Columbia. The team won the bronze medal and Staats was named to the All-World Team.

Additionally, throughout his high school and junior collegiate career, Staats played for the Six Nations Arrows in the OLA Junior A Lacrosse League. In 2017, led by coach Patrick Merrill, he won the Minto Cup for the Six Nations Arrows and earned MVP honors in the championship game.

Playing at OCC, Staats had back-to-back breakout seasons in 2017 and 2018, where he totaled 156 points and helped the team go undefeated, winning the NJCAA national championship and earning All-America honors in both years.

== Professional career ==
=== National Lacrosse League ===
Rather than continuing his collegiate career and transferring to an NCAA program, Staats decided instead to become declare himself for the 2018 NLL Entry Draft. He was selected first overall by the San Diego Seals, which was their first ever draft selection and reunited him with head coach Patrick Merrill. In his first season, he scored 61 points, helping guide the Seals to the playoffs, however Staats missed the postseason after tearing his ACL with only two regular season games remaining. He was named NLL Rookie of the Week four times, as well as NLL Rookie of the Year and he was named to the All-Rookie Team.

After his ACL injury in 2019 and the COVID-19 pandemic shortening the 2020 season, Staats was able to play his first full NLL season in 2022. He scored 79 points and led the team to its second playoff berth, where the Seals lost 2 games to 1 in the Western Conference Final to the Colorado Mammoth. In the final minutes of the game, Staats was issued a gross misconduct penalty by the referees. Though no further details were released, Staats was issued a two-game suspension to start the 2023 season.

In the 2024 season, Staats scored a career high 102 points, which helped send the Seals to their fourth playoff run. The Seals lost 2 games to 0 in the semi-finals to the Albany FireWolves, and in the final moments of their final game, Staats threw two unprovoked cross-checks into the back of FireWolves player Anthony Joaquim's head. Staats was issued a major penalty for the hits, and was suspended for the first seven games of the 2025 season. After his suspension was due to expire, the NLL extended it through the rest of the 2025 season after being arrested on multiple counts of assault.

On November 13, 2025, the NLL reinstated Staats, but he was released by the Seals on December 2. A few days later, the NLL again suspended Staats, placing him on investigative leave as his legal issues continued.

=== Premier Lacrosse League ===
After his torn ACL prevented him from playing in the PLL's inaugural season, Staats made his Premier Lacrosse League debut in 2020 playing for the Chaos Lacrosse Club. He scored 6 points across his 7 appearances.

In the 2021 PLL season, after playing only a single game, Staats' contract was abruptly terminated by the PLL after an off-field fight between himself and Chrome Lacrosse Club player Matt Gaudet, in which he bit off part of Gaudet's middle finger. Staats' PLL contract with the Chaos was reinstated in June 2022, after he completed a program organized by the PLL's Discipline and Conduct Committee. In the 2022 season, he only played in two games before being let go by the Chaos.

=== International Competition ===
In 2015, Staats competed in the 2015 World Indoor Lacrosse Championship in the Onondaga Nation in the United States, south of Syracuse, New York. The team won silver.

In July 2018, Staats competed in the 2018 World Lacrosse Championship in Netanya, Israel, again playing for the Haudenosaunee National team. The team won a bronze medal and he was named to the All-World team.

In January 2019, World Games named Staats as their Athlete of the Month.

In 2023, Staats again competed for the Haudenosaunee National Lacrosse team at the 2023 World Lacrosse Championship in San Diego, California. The team again came in third, winning the bronze medal, and he was named as the Best Attacker and named to the All-World Team. However, in January 2024, after an investigation by the International Testing Agency found that Staats tested positive for recreational cocaine usage, his individual awards were revoked by World Lacrosse.

== Personal life ==
Because of the low pay issued to professional lacrosse players, Staats supplements his income by being a part-time firefighter.

In October 2023, Staats was charged with aggravated assault in the aftermath of an consensual bar fight. In August 2024, Staats was arrested in Brantford, Ontario, on three counts of assault. In June 2025, he was charged with mischief.

== Player stats ==
=== National Lacrosse League ===
Austin Staats		Regular season									Playoffs								
Season	Team	GP	G	A	Pts	LB	PIM	Pts/GP	LB/GP	PIM/GP	GP	G	A	Pts	LB	PIM	Pts/GP	LB/GP	PIM/GP
2019	San Diego Seals	14	32	29	61	81	25	4.36	5.79	1.79	0	0	0	0	0	0	0.00	0.00	0.00
2020	San Diego Seals	5	10	16	26	22	5	5.20	4.40	1.00	0	0	0	0	0	0	0.00	0.00	0.00
2022	San Diego Seals	15	37	42	79	53	35	5.27	3.53	2.33	4	10	9	19	21	12	4.75	5.25	3.00
2023	San Diego Seals	16	37	38	75	83	35	4.69	5.19	2.19	1	3	1	4	8	0	4.00	8.00	0.00
2024	San Diego Seals	18	50	52	102	84	38	5.67	4.67	2.11	3	9	6	15	18	24	5.00	6.00	8.00
		68	166	177	343	323	138	5.04	4.75	2.03	8	22	16	38	47	36	4.75	5.88	4.50
Career Total:		76	188	193	381	370	174	5.01	4.87	2.29									

GP–Games played; G–Goals; A–Assists; Pts–Points; LB–Loose balls; PIM–Penalty minutes; Pts/GP–Points per games played; LB/GP–Loose balls per games played; PIM/GP–Penalty minutes per games played.

=== Premier Lacrosse League ===
Season	Team	Regular season											Playoffs										
Season	Team	GP	G	2PG	A	Pts	Sh	GB	Pen	PIM	FOW	FOA	GP	G	2PG	A	Pts	Sh	GB	Pen	PIM	FOW	FOA
2020	Chaos Lacrosse Club	7	5	0	1	6	10	0	0	2	0	0	–	–	–	–	–	–	–	–	–	–	–
2021	Chaos Lacrosse Club	1	0	0	0	0	1	0	0	0	0	0	–	–	–	–	–	–	–	–	–	–	–
2022	Chaos Lacrosse Club	2	1	0	2	3	5	0	0	0	0	0	–	–	–	–	–	–	–	–	–	–	–
		10	6	0	3	9	16	0	0	2	0	0	0	0	0	0	0	0	0	0	0	0	0
Career total:		10	6	0	3	9	16	0	0	2	0	0											

GP–Games played; G–Goals; 2PG–2-point goals; A–Assists; Pts–Points; Sh–Shots; GB–Ground balls; Pen–Penalties; PIM–Penalty minutes; FOW–Faceoffs won; FOA–Faceoffs attempted
