= 2025 Toronto Rock season =

Season of Toronto Rock lacrosse team

2025 Toronto Rock
- League: National Lacrosse League
- Rank: 13th
- 2025 record: 6–13
- Home record: 2–7
- Road record: 4–5
- Goals for: 189
- Goals against: 208
- General Manager: Jamie Dawick
- Coach: Matt Sawyer
- Captain: Challen Rogers
- Arena: Paramount Fine Foods Centre

The Toronto Rock are a professional lacrosse team based in Hamilton, Ontario playing in the National Lacrosse League (NLL). The 2025 season is the 27th in franchise history, and 26th as the Rock. The Rock played this season at the Paramount Fine Foods Centre in Mississauga while their home arena was closed for renovations.

== Regular season ==
The Rock temporarily relocated their home games to the Paramount Fine Foods Centre in Mississauga, Ontario for the 2024–25 season, as Hamilton's FirstOntario Centre was closed for renovations.

The Rock had a strong 2024 season, finishing with a franchise best 15–3 regular season record and first place in the league. However, the team lost to the eventual champion Buffalo Bandits in the semi-finals of the playoffs.

Latrell Harris, the National Lacrosse League Defensive Player of the Year Award in 2023 who missed all of the 2023 season due to an injury to his ACL sustained in the offseason, will return to the team.

The team struggled at the start of the regular season, losing its first 5 games before defeating the Saskatchewan Rush 18 January.

=== Standings ===
P	Team	GP	W	L	PCT	GB	Home	Road	GF	GA	Diff	GF/GP	GA/GP
1	Buffalo Bandits – xz	18	13	5	.722	0.0	6–3	7–2	242	195	+47	13.44	10.83
2	Saskatchewan Rush – x	18	13	5	.722	0.0	6–3	7–2	213	179	+34	11.83	9.94
3	Halifax Thunderbirds – x	18	11	7	.611	2.0	6–3	5–4	239	213	+26	13.28	11.83
4	Vancouver Warriors – x	18	11	7	.611	2.0	7–2	4–5	196	172	+24	10.89	9.56
5	Rochester Knighthawks – x	18	10	8	.556	3.0	4–5	6–3	228	209	+19	12.67	11.61
6	Calgary Roughnecks – x	18	10	8	.556	3.0	3–6	7–2	219	209	+10	12.17	11.61
7	Georgia Swarm – x	18	9	9	.500	4.0	4–5	5–4	214	217	−3	11.89	12.06
8	San Diego Seals – x	18	9	9	.500	4.0	6–3	3–6	215	209	+6	11.94	11.61
9	Ottawa Black Bears	18	8	10	.444	5.0	4–5	4–5	183	202	−19	10.17	11.22
10	Colorado Mammoth	18	8	10	.444	5.0	4–5	4–5	195	212	−17	10.83	11.78
11	Albany FireWolves	18	7	11	.389	6.0	5–4	2–7	192	209	−17	10.67	11.61
12	Philadelphia Wings	18	7	11	.389	6.0	4–5	3–6	207	231	−24	11.50	12.83
13	Toronto Rock	18	6	12	.333	7.0	2–7	4–5	189	208	−19	10.50	11.56
14	Las Vegas Desert Dogs	18	4	14	.222	9.0	2–7	2–7	189	256	−67	10.50	14.22

== Game log ==
=== Regular season ===
Game	Date	Opponent	Location	Score	OT	Attendance	Record
1	November 29, 2024	@ Ottawa Black Bears	Canadian Tire Centre	L 5–11		6,995	0–1
2	December 7, 2024	Albany FireWolves	Paramount Fine Foods Centre	L 4–15		5,044	0–2
3	December 14, 2024	@ Georgia Swarm	Gas South Arena	L 9–10		4,570	0–3
4	December 28, 2024	Ottawa Black Bears	Paramount Fine Foods Centre	L 11–12		5,196	0–4
5	January 10, 2025	@ Buffalo Bandits	KeyBank Center	L 13–15		17,240	0–5
6	January 18, 2025	Saskatchewan Rush	Paramount Fine Foods Centre	W 11–8		5,011	1–5
7	January 24, 2025	@ Calgary Roughnecks	Scotiabank Saddledome	W 9–5		11,759	2–5
8	February 1, 2025	@ Colorado Mammoth	Ball Arena	W 9–8	OT	10,441	3–5
9	February 8, 2025	San Diego Seals	Paramount Fine Foods Centre	L 10–11		5,030	3–6
10	February 14, 2025	Buffalo Bandits	Paramount Fine Foods Centre	L 12–13		5,167	3–7
11	February 22, 2025	Georgia Swarm	Paramount Fine Foods Centre	L 10–11	OT	5,184	3–8
12	March 7, 2025	@ Halifax Thunderbirds	Scotiabank Centre	W 15–12		9,892	4–8
13	March 14, 2025	@ Vancouver Warriors	Rogers Arena	L 8–13		9,990	4–9
14	March 22, 2025	Philadelphia Wings	Paramount Fine Foods Centre	W 15–8		5,232	5–9
15	April 6, 2025	@ Las Vegas Desert Dogs	Lee's Family Forum	L 13–14	OT	4,916	5–10
16	April 11, 2025	Vancouver Warriors	Paramount Fine Foods Centre	L 10–12		5,014	5–11
17	April 18, 2025	Halifax Thunderbirds	Paramount Fine Foods Centre	L 9–16		5,235	5–12
18	April 19, 2025	@ Rochester Knighthawks	Blue Cross Arena	W 11–10		6,445	6–12

== Roster ==
Toronto Rock roster
Active (21-man) roster		Inactive roster	Coaches
Goaltenders: 92 (Canada) Troy Holowchuk; 31 (Canada) Gowah Abrams; Defensemen: 22 (Canada) Jake Darlison; 81 (United States) Elijah Gash; 93 (Canada) Latrell Harris; 91 (Canada) Billy Hostrawser (A); 37 (Canada) Robert Hudson; 3 (United States) T. D. Ierlan; 33 (Canada) Josh Jubenville; 20 (Canada) Bradley Kri (A); 24 (Canada) Justin J. Martin; 55 (Canada) Chris Weier	Forwards: 21 (Canada) Chris Boushy; 44 (Canada) Brian Cameron; 25 (Canada) Dan Craig; 8 (Canada) Josh Dawick; 5 (Canada) Zack Kearney; 2 (Canada) Zach Manns; 42 (Canada) Mark Matthews; 34 (Canada) Luke Robinson; 26 (United States) Tom Schreiber; 15 (Canada) Corey Small; 9 (Canada) Gavin Thibeau; 95 (Canada) Aaron Woods; Transition: 14 (Canada) Phil Mazzuca; 23 (Canada) Challen Rogers (C)		Head coach: Matt Sawyer; Assistant coaches: Bruce Codd; Rusty Kruger; Blaine Manning; Brandon Miller; Colin Doyle; Legend: * Suspended list; (C) Captain; (A) Alternate captain; Roster updated 2025-3-6; NLL Transactions

=== Entry Draft ===
The 2024 NLL Entry Draft took place on September 15, 2024, at the Toronto Rock Athletic Centre in Toronto. The Toronto Rock made the following selections:

Round	Overall	Player	Position	College/Club
1	2	Sam English	F	Oakville Rock - Syracuse University
1	13	Jake Darlison	T	Whitby Warriors Jr. A
3	36	Alex Messier	D	Halton Hills Bulldogs Jr. B
4	47	Landen Sinfield	O	Akwesasne Jr. B
4	55	Colton Armitage	O	St. Catharines Athletics Jr. A
5	63	Connor Shellenberger		University of Virginia
5	70	Ethan Fisher	D	St. Catharines Athletics Jr. A
