= Ethan Walker (lacrosse) =

Canadian lacrosse player (born 1997)

Personal information
- Nickname: "E-Walk"
- Born: September 1, 1997 (age 29) Peterborough, Ontario, Canada
- Height: 5 ft 9 in (175 cm)
- Weight: 170 lb (77 kg; 12 st 2 lb)

Sport
- Position: Attack (field), Forward (box)
- Shoots: Left
- NCAA team: Denver (2021)
- NLL draft: 10th overall, 2020; Georgia Swarm
- NLL team Former teams: Oshawa FireWolves; Albany FireWolves; Georgia Swarm
- PLL team: Philadelphia Waterdogs
- Pro career: 2021–present

Ethan Walker (born September 1, 1997) is a Canadian professional lacrosse player for the Philadelphia Waterdogs of the Premier Lacrosse League (PLL) and the Oshawa FireWolves of the National Lacrosse League (NLL). He played collegiately for the Denver Pioneers, where he was a three-time All-American and holds the programs all-time points record. Walker is currently a lacrosse coach for Rockhurst High School in Kansas City, Missouri.

== Early life ==
Walker was born in Peterborough, Ontario. He began playing lacrosse at age two. He played box lacrosse before moving during his sophomore year to play field lacrosse at Culver Military Academy in Culver, Indiana. He verbally committed to the University of Denver at the age of 15. In his senior season in 2015–16, he tallied 108 goals and 53 assists, helping the team to a 20–3 record, and was named the USA Today Boys National Lacrosse Player of the Year. He totaled 316 goals and 105 assists over three seasons, passing the 100-goal mark every year.

== College career ==
Walker scored a hat trick in each of his first three games for the Denver Pioneers to start the 2017 season. He contributed eight points in the game that clinched the Big East Conference regular-season title, setting the single-game program record for points by a freshman. He then set the program record for total points by a freshman with 72 points on 40 goals and 32 assists and was named the Big East freshman of the year. Denver made it to the semifinals of the 2017 NCAA tournament but lost to eventual champions Maryland, though Walker was named to the all-tournament team.

Walker led the Pioneers with 70 points on 48 goals and 22 assists in the 2018 season, being nominated for the Tewaaraton Award and named third-team USILA All-American. He again led the team with 52 points on 39 goals and 13 assists in 2019 and was nominated for the Tewaaraton Award for a second time. In the off-season later that year, he won the Mann Cup with the Peterborough Lakers. Following his 2020 senior season being truncated by the COVID-19 pandemic, he returned to lead the team with 39 goals and totaled 60 points in the 2021 season. A four-time first-team Big East honoree, Walker holds multiple career program records, including most points (279) and most assists (98).

== Professional career ==
=== NLL ===
==== Georgia Swarm ====
Walker was drafted 10th overall by the Georgia Swarm in the 2020 NLL entry draft. He made 10 appearances for the Swarm in the 2022 season, registering 30 points on 8 goals and 22 assists.

==== Albany FireWolves ====
Walker was traded to the Albany FireWolves on August 24, 2022. He recorded 56 points on 26 goals and 30 assists in the 2023 season, though the team won only three games. He became an assistant captain of the FireWolves in the 2024 season. He recorded 40 points in the first eight games of the season. Walker finished the season with 85 points and helped lead the FireWolves to the NLL Finals where they fell to the Buffalo Bandits.

=== PLL ===
==== Philadelphia Waterdogs ====
Walker was drafted 27th overall by the Philadelphia Waterdogs in the 2021 PLL college draft. He made five appearances in the 2021 season, recording 14 points on 4 goals and 10 assists. He recorded 13 points on 9 goals and 4 assists in the 2022 season as the Waterdogs went on to win the PLL championship. In the 2023 season, he recorded 30 points on 16 goals and 14 assists in 10 appearances. The 2023 season ended with Walker and the Waterdogs losing 14–15 in the PLL Championship to the Carolina Chaos.

== International career ==
Walker represented Canada at the Under-19 World Lacrosse Championships in 2016, where they finished runners-up to the United States.

== Statistics ==
=== PLL ===
| Season | Team | Regular season | | | | | | | | | | | Playoffs | | | | | | | | | | |
| Season | Team | GP | G | 2PG | A | Pts | Sh | GB | Pen | PIM | FOW | FOA | GP | G | 2PG | A | Pts | Sh | GB | Pen | PIM | FOW | FOA |
|---|---|---|---|---|---|---|---|---|---|---|---|---|---|---|---|---|---|---|---|---|---|---|---|
| 2021 | Waterdogs LC | 5 | 4 | 0 | 10 | 14 | 14 | 10 | 0 | 0 | 0 | 0 | 1 | 2 | 0 | 0 | 2 | 2 | 2 | 0 | 0 | 0 | 0 |
| 2022 | Waterdogs LC | 9 | 9 | 0 | 4 | 13 | 30 | 11 | 1 | 0.5 | 0 | 0 | 3 | 6 | 0 | 2 | 8 | 8 | 6 | 0 | 0 | 0 | 0 |
| 2023 | Waterdogs LC | 10 | 16 | 0 | 14 | 30 | 57 | 20 | 1 | 0.5 | 0 | 0 | 3 | 4 | 0 | 4 | 8 | 10 | 3 | 0 | 0 | 0 | 0 |
| 2024 | Philadelphia Waterdogs | 10 | 5 | 0 | 5 | 10 | 29 | 11 | 0 | 0 | 0 | 0 | – | – | – | – | – | – | – | – | – | – | – |
| | | 34 | 34 | 0 | 33 | 67 | 130 | 52 | 2 | 1 | 0 | 0 | 7 | 12 | 0 | 6 | 18 | 20 | 11 | 0 | 0 | 0 | 0 |
| Career total: | | 41 | 46 | 0 | 39 | 85 | 150 | 63 | 2 | 1 | 0 | 0 | | | | | | | | | | | |

GP–Games played; G–Goals; 2PG–2-point goals; A–Assists; Pts–Points; Sh–Shots; GB–Ground balls; Pen–Penalties; PIM–Penalty minutes; FOW–Faceoffs won; FOA–Faceoffs attempted

=== NLL ===
| Ethan Walker | | Regular season | | | | | | | | | Playoffs | | | | | | | | |
| Season | Team | GP | G | A | Pts | LB | PIM | Pts/GP | LB/GP | PIM/GP | GP | G | A | Pts | LB | PIM | Pts/GP | LB/GP | PIM/GP |
|---|---|---|---|---|---|---|---|---|---|---|---|---|---|---|---|---|---|---|---|
| 2022 | Georgia Swarm | 10 | 8 | 22 | 30 | 42 | 2 | 3.00 | 4.20 | 0.20 | – | – | – | – | – | – | – | – | – |
| 2023 | Albany FireWolves | 17 | 26 | 30 | 56 | 67 | 7 | 3.29 | 3.94 | 0.41 | – | – | – | – | – | – | – | – | – |
| 2024 | Albany FireWolves | 18 | 32 | 53 | 85 | 89 | 4 | 4.72 | 4.94 | 0.22 | 5 | 7 | 19 | 26 | 14 | 2 | 5.20 | 2.80 | 0.40 |
| 2025 | Albany FireWolves | 17 | 27 | 48 | 75 | 77 | 4 | 4.41 | 4.53 | 0.24 | – | – | – | – | – | – | – | – | – |
| 2026 | Oshawa FireWolves | 18 | 19 | 34 | 53 | 53 | 4 | 2.94 | 2.94 | 0.22 | – | – | – | – | – | – | – | – | – |
| | | 80 | 112 | 187 | 299 | 328 | 21 | 3.74 | 4.10 | 0.26 | 5 | 7 | 19 | 26 | 14 | 2 | 5.20 | 2.80 | 0.40 |
| Career Total: | | 85 | 119 | 206 | 325 | 342 | 23 | 3.82 | 4.02 | 0.27 | | | | | | | | | |

GP–Games played; G–Goals; A–Assists; Pts–Points; LB–Loose balls; PIM–Penalty minutes; Pts/GP–Points per games played; LB/GP–Loose balls per games played; PIM/GP–Penalty minutes per games played.

== Personal life ==
In September 2022, Walker moved to Kansas City, Missouri, to become the director of Building Champions Lacrosse, an academy program at the HomeField KC sports facility.

Walker is married to former professional soccer player Jenna Walker, formerly of the Kansas City Current. They got engaged in July 2024.
