= Ryan Benesch =

Canadian lacrosse player (born 1985)

Personal information
- Nickname: The Bullet Eric Benesch’s brother
- Nationality: Canadian
- Born: January 30, 1985 (age 41) Kitchener, Ontario, Canada
- Height: 5 ft 9 in (175 cm)
- Weight: 180 lb (82 kg; 12 st 12 lb)

Sport
- Position: Forward
- Shoots: Left
- NLL draft: 1st overall, 2006; San Jose Stealth
- NLL teams: Buffalo Bandits; Rochester Knighthawks; Colorado Mammoth; Minnesota Swarm; Edmonton Rush; Toronto Rock; Panther City LC; Albany FireWolves; Halifax Thunderbirds; San Diego Seals; Oshawa FireWolves
- MSL team: Kitchener-Waterloo Kodiaks
- Pro career: 2007–2026

Ryan Benesch (born January 30, 1985) is a Canadian former professional box lacrosse player. Benesch played for the Buffalo Bandits, Halifax Thunderbirds, Albany FireWolves, Colorado Mammoth, Minnesota Swarm, Edmonton Rush, Toronto Rock, Panther City LC, San Diego Seals, and Oshawa FireWolves. He was the 2011 NLL scoring leader. Benesch was born in Kitchener, Ontario, Canada.

== Professional career ==
Benesch was drafted first overall by the San Jose Stealth in the 2006 NLL entry draft, but was traded to Toronto Rock along with Chad Thompson and Kevin Fines for 2005 NLL MVP Colin Doyle. Benesch played his minor lacrosse in Kitchener-Waterloo as well as his Junior 'A' lacrosse. He is currently the second leading scorer all-time in Kitchener-Waterloo Braves history behind Colin Doyle.

Benesch was named Rookie of the Week three times in the 2007 season, in weeks 4, 11, and 12, and was also named Rookie of the Month in March. On May 8, 2007, Benesch was awarded the Rookie of the Year Award, and named to the All-Rookie team.

Early in the 2009 NLL season, Benesch and veteran Derek Suddons were traded to the Edmonton Rush for future draft picks. After one season in Edmonton, he was traded again, this time to the Minnesota Swarm along with Scott Self and a draft pick for Scott Stewart, Ryan Ward, Justin Norbraten, and Richard Morgan.

After four seasons in Minnesota where he averaged 83 points per season (leading the league in 2011), Benesch was traded to the Buffalo Bandits along with Andrew Watt for two first round draft picks and a third round pick. Benesch was traded to the Colorado Mammoth, along with a conditional third round draft pick in exchange for Callum Crawford and Alex Buque on August 1, 2017. After spending one and a half seasons with the Colorado Mammoth, on March 6, 2019 he was traded to the Rochester Knighthawks for Cory Vitarelli. He finished the season in Rochester, but signed with the Halifax Thunderbirds for the 2020 season.

Benesch was then selected by the Panther City LC in the 2021 NLL expansion draft. He was traded to the Albany FireWolves after three games with Panther City LC. On October 10, 2022 Benesch returned to the Halifax Thunderbirds for a second stint, spending the 2023 and 2024 seasons there. On September 3, 2024 the San Diego Seals signed Ryan Benesch to a one year contract. On October 28, 2025, Benesch returned to the Buffalo Bandits on a one-year contract. On March 10, 2026, Benesch was released by the Bandits. On March 11, 2026, Benesch was signed by the Oshawa FireWolves to a one-year contract. On September 30, 2026, Benesch announced his retirement from lacrosse after 19 seasons.

== Canadian Box career ==
=== Junior ===
Benesch played five full years for the Kitchener-Waterloo Braves of the OLA Junior A Lacrosse League. In 2002, Benesch was given the "Joey Nieuwendyk Award" for Rookie of the Year. He finished his junior career with an outstanding 178 goals and 391 points in just 104 games.

=== Senior ===
Benesch played for the Victoria Shamrocks of the Western Lacrosse Association after his playing rights were acquired from the Kitchener-Waterloo Kodiaks on 29 May 2010, along with those of Chet Koneczny. He was awarded the "Gene Dopp Memorial Trophy" for Rookie of the year in 2007. In 2009, Benesch won the Presidents Cup with the Owen Sound Woodsmen of the OLA Senior B Lacrosse League.

== Statistics ==
=== NLL ===
Ryan Benesch		Regular season									Playoffs								
Season	Team	GP	G	A	Pts	LB	PIM	Pts/GP	LB/GP	PIM/GP	GP	G	A	Pts	LB	PIM	Pts/GP	LB/GP	PIM/GP
2007	Toronto Rock	15	33	25	58	64	6	3.87	4.27	0.40	1	3	0	3	8	0	3.00	8.00	0.00
2008	Toronto Rock	14	19	31	50	71	38	3.57	5.07	2.71	–	–	–	–	–	–	–	–	–
2009	Edmonton Rush	14	17	27	44	71	2	3.14	5.07	0.14	–	–	–	–	–	–	–	–	–
2010	Minnesota Swarm	15	28	55	83	85	2	5.53	5.67	0.13	1	1	3	4	5	0	4.00	5.00	0.00
2011	Minnesota Swarm	16	46	49	95	79	4	5.94	4.94	0.25	1	0	3	3	6	2	3.00	6.00	2.00
2012	Minnesota Swarm	13	33	39	72	38	18	5.54	2.92	1.38	2	4	5	9	9	2	4.50	4.50	1.00
2013	Minnesota Swarm	16	34	50	84	59	14	5.25	3.69	0.88	2	7	9	16	9	0	8.00	4.50	0.00
2014	Buffalo Bandits	18	25	53	78	88	10	4.33	4.89	0.56	3	8	9	17	11	0	5.67	3.67	0.00
2015	Buffalo Bandits	18	55	58	113	99	6	6.28	5.50	0.33	1	2	4	6	9	5	6.00	9.00	5.00
2016	Buffalo Bandits	17	39	53	92	101	17	5.41	5.94	1.00	4	10	12	22	32	4	5.50	8.00	1.00
2017	Buffalo Bandits	14	33	35	68	62	7	4.86	4.43	0.50	–	–	–	–	–	–	–	–	–
2018	Colorado Mammoth	18	36	57	93	96	6	5.17	5.33	0.33	1	2	3	5	7	0	5.00	7.00	0.00
2019	Colorado Mammoth	10	17	30	47	55	2	4.70	5.50	0.20	–	–	–	–	–	–	–	–	–
2019	Rochester Knighthawks	8	18	15	33	42	0	4.13	5.25	0.00	–	–	–	–	–	–	–	–	–
2020	Halifax Thunderbirds	12	18	33	51	76	5	4.25	6.33	0.42	–	–	–	–	–	–	–	–	–
2022	Panther City Lacrosse Club	3	3	9	12	13	2	4.00	4.33	0.67	–	–	–	–	–	–	–	–	–
2022	Albany FireWolves	16	26	43	69	55	8	4.31	3.44	0.50	1	0	1	1	7	0	1.00	7.00	0.00
2023	Halifax Thunderbirds	18	31	44	75	98	4	4.17	5.44	0.22	1	2	1	3	3	4	3.00	3.00	4.00
2024	Halifax Thunderbirds	18	42	39	81	86	10	4.50	4.78	0.56	1	0	1	1	6	0	1.00	6.00	0.00
2025	San Diego Seals	16	27	39	66	65	6	4.13	4.06	0.38	1	0	0	0	9	0	0.00	9.00	0.00
2026	Buffalo Bandits	8	8	10	18	9	2	2.25	1.13	0.25	–	–	–	–	–	–	–	–	–
		297	588	794	1,382	1,412	169	4.65	4.75	0.57	20	39	51	90	121	17	4.50	6.05	0.85
Career Total:		317	627	845	1,472	1,533	186	4.64	4.84	0.59									

GP–Games played; G–Goals; A–Assists; Pts–Points; LB–Loose balls; PIM–Penalty minutes; Pts/GP–Points per games played; LB/GP–Loose balls per games played; PIM/GP–Penalty minutes per games played.

=== OLA ===
			Regular Season					Playoffs
Season	Team	League	GP	G	A	Pts	PIM	GP	G	A	Pts	PIM
2001	Kitchener-Waterloo Braves	OLA Jr.A	3	3	3	6	0	--	--	--	--	--
2002	Kitchener-Waterloo Braves	OLA Jr.A	19	25	35	60	4	--	--	--	--	--
2003	Kitchener-Waterloo Braves	OLA Jr.A	19	37	57	94	17	5	2	11	13	14
2004	Kitchener-Waterloo Braves	OLA Jr.A	19	28	36	64	25	5	4	3	7	2
2005	Kitchener-Waterloo Braves	OLA Jr.A	22	43	43	86	19	7	8	9	17	2
2006	Kitchener-Waterloo Braves	OLA Jr.A	22	42	39	81	34	5	3	4	7	4
2006	Kitchener-Waterloo Kodiaks	MSL	0	0	0	0	0	4	7	9	16	0
2007	Kitchener-Waterloo Kodiaks	MSL	17	29	30	59	4	3	6	5	11	2
2008	Kitchener-Waterloo Kodiaks	MSL	18	30	36	66	0	3	5	4	9	0
2009	Kitchener-Waterloo Kodiaks	MSL	17	31	41	72	6	1	2	1	3	0
2009	Owen Sound Woodsmen	OLA Sr.B	6	24	21	45	0	3	8	7	15	0
Presidents Cup	Owen Sound Woodsmen	CLA	--	--	--	--	--	5	16	10	26	4
Junior A Totals			104	178	213	391	99	22	17	27	44	22
Senior A Totals			52	90	107	197	10	40	20	19	39	2
Senior B Totals			6	24	21	45	0	3	8	7	15	0
Presidents Cup Totals			--	--	--	--	--	5	16	10	26	4

== Awards ==
Preceded by Brodie Merrill	NLL Rookie of the Year; 2007	Succeeded by Craig Point
