= National Lacrosse League Monthly Awards =

Sports awards

In the 1994 season, the National Lacrosse League (then called the Major Indoor Lacrosse League) began naming a Player of the Month. The award is determined by a vote of the general managers and head coaches of the NLL teams.

The first recipient was Buffalo Bandits goaltender Steve Dietrich.

In 1998, the league added the Rookie of the Month award.

== Player of the Month ==
Players listed in italics are retired.

Player	Count
John Tavares	9
Gary Gait	6
Paul Gait	5
Ted Dowling	3
Athan Iannucci	3
Rob Blasdell	2
John Grant, Jr.	2
Gavin Prout	2
Bob Watson	2

== Rookie of the Month ==
1998-present

Player	Count
Ryan Boyle	2
Craig Conn	2
John Grant, Jr.	2
Tracey Kelusky	2
Brodie Merrill	2

== See also ==
- National Lacrosse League Weekly Awards
- List of NLL seasons -- contains the winners for each month
