= San Diego Seals =

National Lacrosse League team in San Diego County, California

- Sport: Box lacrosse
- Founded: 2017
- League: National Lacrosse League
- Location: Oceanside, California
- Arena: Frontwave Arena
- Colors: Purple, black, gold, gray
- Owner: Joseph Tsai
- Head coach: Patrick Merrill
- General manager: Patrick Merrill
- Division titles: 2 (2022, 2023)
- Playoff berths: 6 (2019, 2022, 2023, 2024, 2025, 2026)
- Retired numbers: 1 (17)
- Website: sealslax.com

The San Diego Seals are an American professional box lacrosse team based in San Diego County, California, that competes in the National Lacrosse League (NLL). The team plays its home games at Frontwave Arena. The Seals began play in the 2018–19 season.

== History ==
On August 30, 2017, the NLL awarded an expansion franchise to the city of San Diego and owner Joseph Tsai, co-founder of the Chinese e-commerce platform Alibaba Group. Tsai, a La Jolla resident, "played lacrosse at Yale University and retains a passion for the sport." The franchise fee for San Diego and fellow expansion team Philadelphia Wings was a reported $5 million.

On October 24, 2017, the name of the franchise was revealed as the San Diego Seals.

== Current roster ==
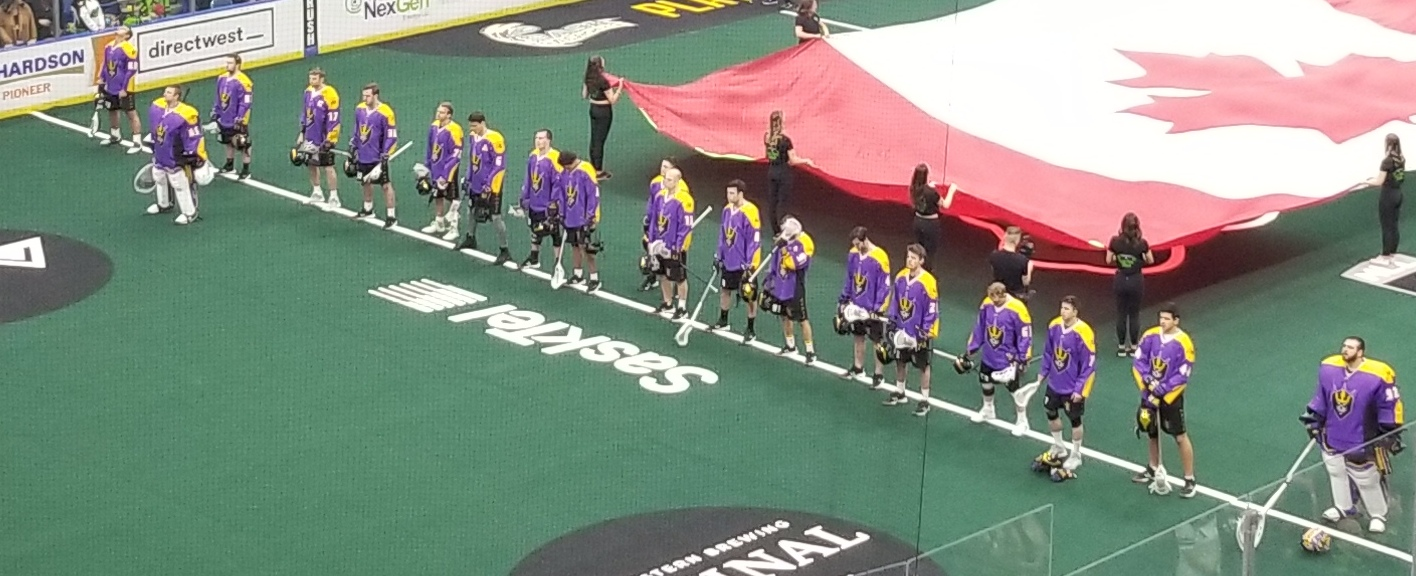
The San Diego Seals playing at the SaskTel Centre in 2019

San Diego Seals roster
| Active (21-man) roster | | Inactive roster | Coaches |
|---|---|---|---|
| Goaltenders: 31 (Canada) Chris Origlieri; 30 (Canada) Mike Poulin; Defensemen: 2 (Canada) Drew Belgrave; 15 (Canada) Graydon Bradley; 23 (Canada) Zack Deaken; 25 (United States) Eli Gobrecht; 19 (Canada) Cam Holding (A); 7 (Canada) Jesse Gamble; 10 (Canada) Kellen LeClair; 91 (United States) Danny Logan; 4 (Canada) Kyle Rubisch; 20 (United States) Matt Wright | Forwards: 21 (Canada) Ryan Benesch; 14 (Canada) Wesley Berg (C); 10 (Canada) Robert Hellyer; 47 (Canada) Kyle Jackson; 90 (Canada) Ben McIntosh; 16 (Canada) Adam Noakes; Transition: 9 (United States) Trevor Baptiste; 77 (Canada) Zach Currier; 33 (Canada) Tre Leclaire | Practice squad: 51 (Canada) Cam Aacchione; 18 (Canada) Trent DiCicco; 88 (United States) Jake Govett; 11 (Canada) Cameron Lumb; 44 (United States) Jacob Power; 26 (Canada) Patrick Shoemay; 13 (Canada) Justin Sykes; 12 (Canada) Matt Sykes; 92 (Canada) Ty Thompson; 32 (Canada) Robbie Turpin; Restricted list: 83 (Haudenosaunee) Austin Staats | Head coach: Patrick Merrill; Assistant coaches: Jordan Hall; Cam Woods; Legend: * Suspended list; (C) Captain; (A) Alternate captain; updated 2024-12-16; NLL Transactions |

== All-time record ==
| Season | Standing (Note: League was separated into "Divisions" until 2022, called "Conferences" in 2022 and 2023, system was dissolved in 2024.) | W–L | Home | Road | GF | GA | Avg. attendance | 1st round | 2nd round | Finals | Awards | Coach |
|---|---|---|---|---|---|---|---|---|---|---|---|---|
| 2019 | 2nd, Western | 10–8 | 6–3 | 4–5 | 208 | 217 | 7,769 | L, 11–12, CAL | — | — | Austin Staats _{ROY} | Patrick Merrill |
| 2020 | 3rd, Western | 6–6 | 3–3 | 3–3 | 138 | 131 | 4,829 | Playoffs canceled | | | | Patrick Merrill |
| 2021 | Season canceled due to COVID-19 pandemic | | | | | | | | | | | Patrick Merrill |
| 2022 | 1st, Western | 10–8 | 5–4 | 5–4 | 202 | 183 | 5,777 | W, 9–8, PHI | L, 1–2, COL | — | | Patrick Merrill |
| 2023 | 1st, Western | 14–4 | 7–2 | 7–2 | 240 | 193 | 5,114 | L, 12–13, COL | — | — | | Patrick Merrill |
| 2024 | 2nd | 13–5 | 8–1 | 5–4 | 210 | 178 | 4,710 | W, 9–8, PCLC | L, 0–2, ALB | — | | Patrick Merrill |
| 2025 | 8th | 9–9 | 6–3 | 3–6 | 215 | 210 | 5,229 | L, 4–5, BUF | — | — | | Patrick Merrill |
| 2026 | 7th | 8–10 | 3–6 | 5–4 | 185 | 191 | 6,616 | W, 13–12 (OT), COL | L, 1–2, TOR | — | Zach Currier _{TPOY} | Patrick Merrill |
| Total | 7 seasons | 70–50 | 38–22 | 32–28 | 1,398 | 1,303 | 5,759 | 6 Appearances, 0 Championships | | | | |

== Playoff results ==
| Season | Game | Visiting | Home |
|---|---|---|---|
| 2019 | Western Division Semi-Finals | Calgary 12 | San Diego 11 |
| 2022 | Western Conference Semi-finals | Philadelphia 8 | San Diego 9 |
| 2022 | Western Conference Finals Game 1 | Colorado 14 | San Diego 12 |
| 2022 | Western Conference Finals Game 2 | San Diego 11 | Colorado 10 |
| 2022 | Western Conference Finals Game 3 | Colorado 15 | San Diego 13 |
| 2023 | Western Conference Semi-Finals | Colorado 13 | San Diego 12 |
| 2024 | Quarterfinals | Panther City 8 | San Diego 9 |
| 2024 | Semifinals Game 1 | Albany 14 | San Diego 12 |
| 2024 | Semifinals Game 2 | San Diego 10 | Albany 13 |
| 2025 | Quarterfinals | San Diego 4 | Buffalo 5 |
| 2026 | Quarterfinals | San Diego 13 | Colorado 12 (OT) |
| 2026 | Semifinals Game 1 | San Diego 12 | Toronto 14 |
| 2026 | Semifinals Game 2 | Toronto 6 | San Diego 11 |
| 2026 | Semifinals Game 3 | San Diego 8 | Toronto 14 |

== Awards and honors ==
| Year | Player | Award |
|---|---|---|
| 2019 | Austin Staats | Rookie of the Year |
| 2026 | Zach Currier | Transition Player of the Year |

=== Retired numbers ===
| No. | Player | Date | Tenure |
|---|---|---|---|
| 17 | Brodie Merrill | December 9, 2023 | 2019–24 |

== Draft history ==
=== NLL Entry Draft ===
First Round Selections

- 2018: Austin Staats (1st overall), Connor Fields (10th overall), Connor Kearnan (11th overall)
- 2019: None
- 2020: Tre Leclaire (4th overall), Mac O'Keefe (15th overall)
- 2021: Mike McCannell (5th overall), Patrick Shoemay (9th overall), Jacob Dunbar (13th overall)
- 2022: Jake Govett (22nd overall)
- 2023: Matthew Wright (13th overall)
- 2024: Trent DiCicco (9th overall), Jacob Power (12th overall), Robbie Turpin (14th overall)
- 2025: Ari Steenhuis (18th overall)

=== NLL Dispersal Draft ===
- 2024 from Panther City Lacrosse Club: Justin Sykes (11th overall); Callum Crawford (25th overall)

=== NLL Entry Draft ===
- 2019 to Rochester Knighthawks & New York Riptide: Rylan Hartley (5th overall), Connor Kelly (6th overall)
- 2021 to Panther City Lacrosse Club: Nick Damude (5th overall)
- 2022 to Las Vegas Desert Dogs: Frank Scigliano (12th overall)

== Head coaching history ==
| # | Name | Term | Regular season | | | | Playoffs | | | |
| # | Name | Term | GC | W | L | W% | GC | W | L | W% |
|---|---|---|---|---|---|---|---|---|---|---|
| 1 | Patrick Merrill | 2019– | 120 | 70 | 50 | .583 | 14 | 5 | 9 | .357 |

== Media ==
In November 2023, a five-part docuseries recounting the Seals' 2022 season was released on Amazon Prime. It was titled War on the Floor: A Season with the San Diego Seals.
