= Callum Crawford =

Canadian lacrosse player- co owner of Impulse lacrosse

Personal information
- Nickname: Showtime
- Born: November 7, 1984 (age 41) Ottawa, Ontario, Canada
- Height: 6 ft 3 in (191 cm)
- Weight: 205 lb (93 kg; 14 st 9 lb)

Sport
- Position: Forward
- Shoots: Right
- NCAA team: Dowling
- NLL draft: 18th overall, 2005; Calgary Roughnecks
- NLL team Former teams: Albany FireWolves; Buffalo Bandits; Colorado Mammoth; Minnesota Swarm; Edmonton Rush; Chicago Shamrox; San Jose Stealth; Calgary Roughnecks; New England Black Wolves; New York Riptide; Panther City Lacrosse Club; Philadelphia Wings; San Diego Seals
- MLL teams: Boston Cannons; Denver Outlaws; Atlanta Blaze
- PLL teams: Denver Outlaws
- Pro career: 2006–2025

Callum Crawford (born November 7, 1984) is a retired Canadian lacrosse player who played in the National Lacrosse League. He has played for the Buffalo Bandits, Edmonton Rush, Calgary Roughnecks, Philadelphia Wings, San Jose Stealth, Chicago Shamrox, Panther City Lacrosse Club, and Albany FireWolves during his career. He was drafted 18th overall in the 2005 NLL Entry Draft by the Calgary Roughnecks, and was later drafted 25th overall in the 2024 NLL Dispersal Draft by the San Diego Seals, however, as an unrestricted free-agent, he instead signed with the Philadelphia Wings, before playing any games with the Seals.

He is also the founder of the Ottawa Capitals Lacrosse club.

Heading into the 2023 NLL season, Inside Lacrosse ranked Crawford the #6 best forward in the NLL.

== Statistics ==
=== NLL ===
Callum Crawford		Regular season									Playoffs								
Season	Team	GP	G	A	Pts	LB	PIM	Pts/GP	LB/GP	PIM/GP	GP	G	A	Pts	LB	PIM	Pts/GP	LB/GP	PIM/GP
2006	Calgary Roughnecks	5	4	4	8	13	2	1.60	2.60	0.40	–	–	–	–	–	–	–	–	–
2007	San Jose Stealth	13	10	13	23	44	21	1.77	3.38	1.62	2	3	0	3	10	2	1.50	5.00	1.00
2008	Chicago Shamrox	12	14	13	27	37	4	2.25	3.08	0.33	–	–	–	–	–	–	–	–	–
2009	Edmonton Rush	13	19	22	41	48	0	3.15	3.69	0.00	–	–	–	–	–	–	–	–	–
2010	Minnesota Swarm	16	32	64	96	68	2	6.00	4.25	0.13	1	2	0	2	6	0	2.00	6.00	0.00
2011	Minnesota Swarm	16	27	43	70	57	6	4.38	3.56	0.38	1	2	1	3	3	2	3.00	3.00	2.00
2012	Minnesota Swarm	16	25	58	83	56	8	5.19	3.50	0.50	2	1	5	6	13	2	3.00	6.50	1.00
2013	Minnesota Swarm	14	32	63	95	55	2	6.79	3.93	0.14	2	2	13	15	11	0	7.50	5.50	0.00
2014	Minnesota Swarm	18	26	54	80	92	8	4.44	5.11	0.44	–	–	–	–	–	–	–	–	–
2015	Minnesota Swarm	12	19	34	53	54	4	4.42	4.50	0.33	–	–	–	–	–	–	–	–	–
2016	Colorado Mammoth	18	32	83	115	89	15	6.39	4.94	0.83	1	0	3	3	3	0	3.00	3.00	0.00
2017	Colorado Mammoth	18	36	62	98	74	8	5.44	4.11	0.44	3	3	9	12	11	2	4.00	3.67	0.67
2018	Buffalo Bandits	9	18	22	40	29	16	4.44	3.22	1.78	–	–	–	–	–	–	–	–	–
2018	New England Black Wolves	9	15	20	35	47	15	3.89	5.22	1.67	1	3	1	4	8	0	4.00	8.00	0.00
2019	New England Black Wolves	16	48	61	109	78	33	6.81	4.88	2.06	1	4	2	6	5	0	6.00	5.00	0.00
2020	New England Black Wolves	11	33	43	76	52	2	6.91	4.73	0.18	–	–	–	–	–	–	–	–	–
2022	New York Riptide	15	39	49	88	81	6	5.87	5.40	0.40	–	–	–	–	–	–	–	–	–
2023	New York Riptide	3	6	4	10	15	0	3.33	5.00	0.00	–	–	–	–	–	–	–	–	–
2023	Panther City Lacrosse Club	10	19	27	46	38	6	4.60	3.80	0.60	1	1	3	4	4	0	4.00	4.00	0.00
2024	Panther City Lacrosse Club	10	19	27	46	38	6	4.60	3.80	0.60	1	1	3	4	5	0	4.00	5.00	0.00
2025	Philadelphia Wings	1	1	4	5	2	0	5.00	2.00	0.00	–	–	–	–	–	–	–	–	–
2025	Albany FireWolves	1	1	0	1	4	2	1.00	4.00	2.00	–	–	–	–	–	–	–	–	–
		256	475	770	1,245	1,071	166	4.86	4.18	0.65	16	22	40	62	79	8	3.88	4.94	0.50
Career Total:		272	497	810	1,307	1,150	174	4.81	4.23	0.64									

GP–Games played; G–Goals; A–Assists; Pts–Points; LB–Loose balls; PIM–Penalty minutes; Pts/GP–Points per games played; LB/GP–Loose balls per games played; PIM/GP–Penalty minutes per games played.

=== MLL ===
Season	Team	Regular season											Playoffs										
Season	Team	GP	G	2PG	A	Pts	Sh	GB	Pen	PIM	FOW	FOA	GP	G	2PG	A	Pts	Sh	GB	Pen	PIM	FOW	FOA
2016	Boston Cannons	1	0	0	0	0	0	1	0	0	0	0	–	–	–	–	–	–	–	–	–	–	–
2016	Denver Outlaws	4	7	0	7	14	19	5	0	5	0	0	–	–	–	–	–	–	–	–	–	–	–
2017	Atlanta Blaze	1	2	0	0	2	5	0	0	0	0	0	–	–	–	–	–	–	–	–	–	–	–
		6	9	0	7	16	24	6	0	5	0	0	0	0	0	0	0	0	0	0	0	0	0
Career total:		6	9	0	7	16	24	6	0	5	0	0											

GP–Games played; G–Goals; 2PG–2-point goals; A–Assists; Pts–Points; Sh–Shots; GB–Ground balls; Pen–Penalties; PIM–Penalty minutes; FOW–Faceoffs won; FOA–Faceoffs attempted
