= Wesley Berg =

Canadian lacrosse player (born 1993)

Personal information
- Nationality: Canadian
- Born: April 19, 1993 (age 33) Coquitlam, British Columbia, Canada
- Height: 6 ft 2 in (188 cm)
- Weight: 205 lb (93 kg; 14 st 9 lb)

Sport
- Position: Forward (box), Attack (field)
- Shoots: Right
- NCAA team: Denver (2015)
- NLL draft: 4th overall, 2015; Calgary Roughnecks
- NLL team Former teams: San Diego Seals; Calgary Roughnecks
- MLL draft: 15th overall, 2015; Denver Outlaws
- MLL teams: Denver Outlaws
- PLL team Former teams: Redwoods L.C. Waterdogs L.C. Chaos L.C.
- MSL team: Oakville Rock
- Pro career: 2016–
Medal record
Representing Canada
Men's lacrosse
World Lacrosse Championship
Winner	2014 Denver
Runner-up	2018 Netanya
Runner-up	2023 San Diego
Men's box lacrosse
World Lacrosse Box Championships
Winner	2024 Utica

Wesley Berg (born April 19, 1993 in Coquitlam, British Columbia, Canada) is a Canadian professional lacrosse player for the San Diego Seals of the National Lacrosse League (NLL) and the California Redwoods of the Premier Lacrosse League (PLL), serving as captain for the former.

== Junior and Major ==
Berg began his amateur career with the Coquitlam Adanacs Jr. A of the BC Junior A Lacrosse League in 2010. In his first season with the Adanacs, Berg finished with 42 points. Berg and the Adanacs went on to win the Minto Cup. In 2011, Berg finished first in the league in both goals (60) and points (114) and was awarded the Bill Dickinson Trophy as the league's scoring champion. Berg only appeared in 19 regular season games in the following three seasons putting up 98 points during this span.

Berg was drafted in the second round (17th overall) of the 2015 Major Series Lacrosse entry draft by the Oakville Rock. In 2016, Berg finished 9th in scoring with 52 points.

== NCAA ==
Prior to joining the University of Denver Pioneers, Berg attended and played lacrosse at Charles Best Secondary School in Coquitlam, British Columbia.

Playing for Coach Bill Tierney at Denver, Berg started at midfield in his freshman season. He was named the Eastern College Athletic Conference (ECAC) Rookie of the Year after finishing the season tied for second on the team in goals (26) and fifth in points (37).

Moving to the attack position in his sophomore year, Berg helped the Pioneers earn their first No. 1 ranking in program history. He started in 17-of-19 games, leading the team in goals (56) and points (72).

In his junior season, Berg started in all 19 games and finished the season ranked first on the team in goals (48) and points (68).

In his senior season, Berg started in all 19 games and finished the season ranked first on the team in goals (58) and second in points (78). Berg tied for the program's second-most points in a season and broke his own program single-season goals record. Berg and the Pioneers won the 2015 NCAA Division I Men's Lacrosse Championship 10–5 against Maryland as Berg was awarded the Most Outstanding Player of the Tournament.

Denver was 56–14 in Berg's four years there, with three consecutive trips to the final four as well as one national title in his senior season. Berg finished his college career as Denver's career leader in points (255) and goals (188). He also finished his career on a 38-game active point streak and scored 39 career NCAA Tournament goals, the second most in NCAA history.

== MLL ==
Berg was drafted in the second round (15th overall) of the 2015 Major League Lacrosse Collegiate Draft by the Denver Outlaws. In his rookie season with the Outlaws, Berg appeared in only 2 games scoring his first career goal against the Ohio Machine on May 29, 2015. In 2016, Berg was fifth on the team in scoring with 22 points in 10 games. Berg made his first playoff appearance during the 2016 Major League Lacrosse Playoffs. He notably scored 3 goals in the 2016 MLL Championship game as the Denver Outlaws went on to win 19–18 over Ohio.

== NLL ==
Berg was drafted in the first round (4th overall) of the 2015 NLL Entry Draft by the Calgary Roughnecks. In 2016, Berg was named the NLL Rookie of the Month for March, leading all NLL rookies in scoring with 20 points. Berg finished the 2016 NLL season as a NLL Rookie of the Year finalist, finishing the season with 67 points. In 2017, Berg ranked third on the Roughnecks and 14th overall in scoring.

== Premier Lacrosse League ==
On October 22, 2018 it was announced that Berg was joining the Premier Lacrosse League for the summer 2019 season. On March 4, 2019 it was announced that Berg was joining the Chrome Lacrosse Club.

On May 3, 2021, Berg was traded from Waterdogs Lacrosse Club to Chaos Lacrosse Club along with a first round pick in the 2022 College Draft in exchange for goaltender Dillon Ward.

Berg signed a two-year contract with Redwoods Lacrosse Club ahead of the 2023 season.

== International ==
Berg was selected to play for Team Canada at the FIL 2014 World Lacrosse Championship in Denver, Colorado. On Saturday, July 19, 2014, Canada defeated the United States 8–5 to win gold. Berg played in all seven games, finishing the tournament with 5 goals and 7 points.

== Statistics ==
=== NLL ===
Wesley Berg		Regular season									Playoffs								
Season	Team	GP	G	A	Pts	LB	PIM	Pts/GP	LB/GP	PIM/GP	GP	G	A	Pts	LB	PIM	Pts/GP	LB/GP	PIM/GP
2016	Calgary Roughnecks	18	27	40	67	88	16	3.72	4.89	0.89	3	3	6	9	16	0	3.00	5.33	0.00
2017	Calgary Roughnecks	18	35	44	79	75	7	4.39	4.17	0.39	–	–	–	–	–	–	–	–	–
2018	Calgary Roughnecks	18	37	49	86	82	4	4.78	4.56	0.22	2	6	6	12	8	0	6.00	4.00	0.00
2020	San Diego Seals	12	19	39	58	52	4	4.83	4.33	0.33	–	–	–	–	–	–	–	–	–
2022	San Diego Seals	17	34	50	84	79	12	4.94	4.65	0.71	4	7	10	17	19	2	4.25	4.75	0.50
2023	San Diego Seals	18	39	70	109	100	12	6.06	5.56	0.67	1	2	2	4	5	0	4.00	5.00	0.00
2024	San Diego Seals	18	41	67	108	96	18	6.00	5.33	1.00	3	2	12	14	21	0	4.67	7.00	0.00
2025	San Diego Seals	18	49	39	88	82	6	4.89	4.56	0.33	1	1	0	1	6	0	1.00	6.00	0.00
2026	San Diego Seals	18	26	48	74	83	4	4.11	4.61	0.22	4	5	17	22	14	12	5.50	3.50	3.00
		155	307	446	753	737	83	4.86	4.75	0.54	18	26	53	79	89	14	4.39	4.94	0.78
Career Total:		173	333	499	832	826	97	4.81	4.77	0.56									

GP–Games played; G–Goals; A–Assists; Pts–Points; LB–Loose balls; PIM–Penalty minutes; Pts/GP–Points per games played; LB/GP–Loose balls per games played; PIM/GP–Penalty minutes per games played.

=== MLL ===
Season	Team	Regular season											Playoffs										
Season	Team	GP	G	2PG	A	Pts	Sh	GB	Pen	PIM	FOW	FOA	GP	G	2PG	A	Pts	Sh	GB	Pen	PIM	FOW	FOA
2015	Denver Outlaws	2	1	0	0	1	5	0	0	0	0	0	–	–	–	–	–	–	–	–	–	–	–
2016	Denver Outlaws	10	18	0	4	22	70	13	0	3	0	0	2	5	0	0	5	17	2	0	0	0	0
2017	Denver Outlaws	10	20	0	5	25	73	13	0	0	0	0	2	5	0	1	6	12	2	0	0	0	0
2018	Denver Outlaws	7	5	0	7	12	25	8	0	0	0	0	–	–	–	–	–	–	–	–	–	–	–
		29	44	0	16	60	173	34	0	3	0	0	4	10	0	1	11	29	4	0	0	0	0
Career total:		33	54	0	17	71	202	38	0	3	0	0											

GP–Games played; G–Goals; 2PG–2-point goals; A–Assists; Pts–Points; Sh–Shots; GB–Ground balls; Pen–Penalties; PIM–Penalty minutes; FOW–Faceoffs won; FOA–Faceoffs attempted

=== PLL ===
Season	Team	Regular season											Playoffs										
Season	Team	GP	G	2PG	A	Pts	Sh	GB	Pen	PIM	FOW	FOA	GP	G	2PG	A	Pts	Sh	GB	Pen	PIM	FOW	FOA
2019	Redwoods LC	4	4	0	0	4	8	4	0	0	0	0	3	5	0	0	5	13	5	0	0	0	0
2020	Waterdogs LC	5	1	0	4	5	12	3	1	0.5	0	0	–	–	–	–	–	–	–	–	–	–	–
2021	Chaos LC	5	5	0	2	7	11	4	0	0	0	0	3	0	0	0	0	3	2	1	0.5	0	0
2022	Chaos LC	4	3	0	3	6	10	2	0	0	0	0	–	–	–	–	–	–	–	–	–	–	–
2023	Redwoods LC	10	21	0	2	23	43	21	2	1	0	0	2	7	0	0	7	14	1	0	0	0	0
2024	California Redwoods	10	14	0	1	15	28	6	3	2	0	0	–	–	–	–	–	–	–	–	–	–	–
		38	48	0	12	60	112	40	6	3.5	0	0	8	12	0	0	12	30	8	1	0.5	0	0
Career total:		46	60	0	12	72	142	48	7	4	0	0											

GP–Games played; G–Goals; 2PG–2-point goals; A–Assists; Pts–Points; Sh–Shots; GB–Ground balls; Pen–Penalties; PIM–Penalty minutes; FOW–Faceoffs won; FOA–Faceoffs attempted
