= Patrick Merrill =

Canadian lacrosse player (born 1979)

Personal information
- Nickname: Mad Dog
- Born: February 22, 1979 (age 47) Montreal, Quebec, Canada
- Height: 6 ft 0 in (183 cm)
- Weight: 180 lb (82 kg; 12 st 12 lb)

Sport
- Position: Defenseman
- Shoots: Right
- Coached by: San Diego Seals (2019-Present); Six Nations Arrows (2015-2017)
- NLL draft: 1st overall, 2002; Toronto Rock
- NLL team: Toronto Rock (2003-2007, 2011-2017); New York Titans (2008-2009); Orlando Titans (2010)
- MLL team: Toronto Nationals (2009-20010)
- MSL team: Brampton Excelsiors (2009-2010)
- Pro career: 2003–2017

Patrick Merrill (born February 22, 1979) is a Canadian former professional lacrosse player who is the head coach and general manager of the San Diego Seals of the National Lacrosse League (NLL). He played for the Toronto Rock of the NLL and the Toronto Nationals of Major League Lacrosse (MLL).

== Professional career ==
Merrill was a first-round draft choice of the Toronto Rock in 2002, and after four seasons with the Rock, was chosen first overall by the Boston Blazers in the 2008 expansion draft. However, following the cancellation and subsequent reinstatement of the 2008 season, the Blazers, along with the Arizona Sting, announced that they would not participate in the 2008 season. A dispersal draft was held, and Merrill was chosen second overall by the Titans.

Merrill's brother Brodie Merrill also played in the NLL for the San Diego Seals.

== Player statistics ==
=== NLL ===
Patrick Merrill		Regular season									Playoffs								
Season	Team	GP	G	A	Pts	LB	PIM	Pts/GP	LB/GP	PIM/GP	GP	G	A	Pts	LB	PIM	Pts/GP	LB/GP	PIM/GP
2003	Toronto Rock	16	3	2	5	63	39	0.31	3.94	2.44	2	1	1	2	7	6	1.00	3.50	3.00
2004	Toronto Rock	13	1	3	4	49	41	0.31	3.77	3.15	1	0	0	0	7	0	0.00	7.00	0.00
2005	Toronto Rock	12	1	7	8	68	39	0.67	5.67	3.25	2	0	4	4	13	6	2.00	6.50	3.00
2006	Toronto Rock	16	2	9	11	93	45	0.69	5.81	2.81	1	0	0	0	7	2	0.00	7.00	2.00
2007	Toronto Rock	13	0	10	10	57	53	0.77	4.38	4.08	1	1	1	2	3	0	2.00	3.00	0.00
2008	New York Titans	14	0	5	5	78	61	0.36	5.57	4.36	2	0	1	1	8	21	0.50	4.00	10.50
2009	New York Titans	14	3	4	7	64	32	0.50	4.57	2.29	3	1	0	1	13	8	0.33	4.33	2.67
2010	Orlando Titans	16	1	12	13	75	41	0.81	4.69	2.56	2	0	2	2	6	6	1.00	3.00	3.00
2011	Toronto Rock	15	2	2	4	55	26	0.27	3.67	1.73	3	1	1	2	9	2	0.67	3.00	0.67
2012	Toronto Rock	16	2	1	3	44	48	0.19	2.75	3.00	2	0	0	0	8	0	0.00	4.00	0.00
2013	Toronto Rock	16	1	6	7	56	27	0.44	3.50	1.69	1	0	0	0	5	2	0.00	5.00	2.00
2014	Toronto Rock	10	1	1	2	31	33	0.20	3.10	3.30	1	0	0	0	2	0	0.00	2.00	0.00
2015	Toronto Rock	17	1	3	4	62	73	0.24	3.65	4.29	4	0	0	0	12	11	0.00	3.00	2.75
2016	Toronto Rock	4	0	0	0	17	6	0.00	4.25	1.50	–	–	–	–	–	–	–	–	–
2017	Toronto Rock	2	0	0	0	1	6	0.00	0.50	3.00	1	0	0	0	3	0	0.00	3.00	0.00
		194	18	65	83	813	570	0.43	4.19	2.94	26	4	10	14	103	64	0.54	3.96	2.46
Career Total:		220	22	75	97	916	634	0.44	4.16	2.88									

GP–Games played; G–Goals; A–Assists; Pts–Points; LB–Loose balls; PIM–Penalty minutes; Pts/GP–Points per games played; LB/GP–Loose balls per games played; PIM/GP–Penalty minutes per games played.

=== MLL ===
Season	Team	Regular season											Playoffs										
Season	Team	GP	G	2PG	A	Pts	Sh	GB	Pen	PIM	FOW	FOA	GP	G	2PG	A	Pts	Sh	GB	Pen	PIM	FOW	FOA
2009	Toronto Nationals	2	0	0	0	0	0	0	0	0	0	1	0	0	0	0	0	0	0	0	0	0	0
2010	Toronto Nationals	8	0	0	0	0	2	6	0	2	0	1	–	–	–	–	–	–	–	–	–	–	–
		10	0	0	0	0	2	6	0	2	0	2	0	0	0	0	0	0	0	0	0	0	0
Career total:		10	0	0	0	0	2	6	0	2	0	2											

GP–Games played; G–Goals; 2PG–2-point goals; A–Assists; Pts–Points; Sh–Shots; GB–Ground balls; Pen–Penalties; PIM–Penalty minutes; FOW–Faceoffs won; FOA–Faceoffs attempted

=== MSL ===
Patrick Merrill		Regular season									Playoffs								
Season	Team	GP	G	A	Pts	LB	PIM	Pts/GP	LB/GP	PIM/GP	GP	G	A	Pts	LB	PIM	Pts/GP	LB/GP	PIM/GP
2009	Brampton Excelsiors	16	2	3	5	0	16	0.31	0.00	1.00	14	1	0	1	3	29	0.07	0.21	2.07
2010	Brampton Excelsiors	6	2	4	6	4	11	1.00	0.67	1.83	12	0	4	4	0	39	0.33	0.00	3.25
		22	4	7	11	4	27	0.50	0.18	1.23	26	1	4	5	3	68	0.19	0.12	2.62
Career Total:		48	5	11	16	7	95	0.33	0.15	1.98									

GP–Games played; G–Goals; A–Assists; Pts–Points; LB–Loose balls; PIM–Penalty minutes; Pts/GP–Points per games played; LB/GP–Loose balls per games played; PIM/GP–Penalty minutes per games played.

== Coaching Statistics ==
=== NLL ===
Team	Season	Regular Season				Playoffs				Playoff result
Team	Season	GC	W	L	W%	GC	W	L	W%	Playoff result
San Diego Seals	2019	18	10	8	.556	1	0	1	.000	Lost Western Division Semi-final (CGY)
San Diego Seals	2020	12	6	6	.500	–	–	–	–	Season suspended due to COVID-19 pandemic
San Diego Seals	2022	18	10	8	.556	4	2	2	.500	Lost Western Conference Final (COL)
San Diego Seals	2023	18	14	4	.777	1	0	1	.000	Lost Western Division Semi-final (COL)
San Diego Seals	2024	18	13	5	.722	3	1	2	.333	Lost NLL Semifinals (ALB)
San Diego Seals	2025	18	9	9	.500	1	0	1	.000	Lost NLL Quarterfinal (BUF)
San Diego Seals	2026	18	8	10	.444	4	2	2	.500	Lost Semifinals (TOR)
Totals:	7	120	70	50	.583	14	5	9	.357	

=== OJLL ===
Team	Season	Regular Season				Playoffs			
Team	Season	GC	W	L	W%	GC	W	L	W%
Six Nations Arrows	2015	20	17	3	.850	13	12	1	.923
Six Nations Arrows	2016	20	18	2	.900	11	7	4	.636
Six Nations Arrows	2017	20	18	2	.900	9	9	0	1.000
Totals:	3	60	53	7	.883	33	28	5	.848
