= Brodie Merrill =

Canadian lacrosse player (born 1981)

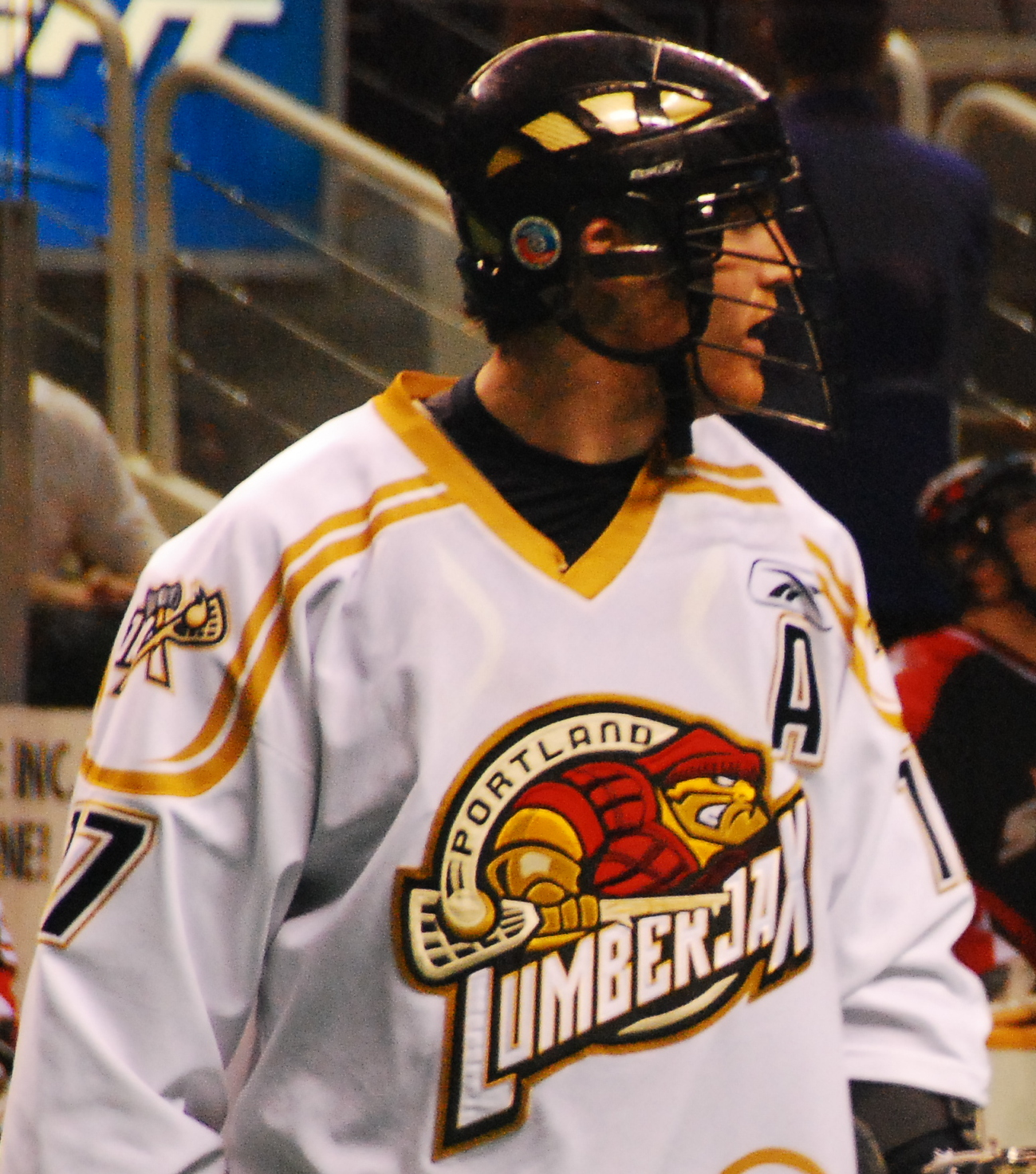
- Merrill with the Portland Lumberjax in 2009

Personal information
- Born: November 5, 1981 (age 44) Montreal, Quebec, Canada
- Height: 6 ft 4 in (193 cm)
- Weight: 205 lb (93 kg; 14 st 9 lb)

Sport
- Position: Defense/LSM (Field), Transition (Box)
- Shoots: Left
- NCAA team: Georgetown (2005)
- NLL draft: 1st overall, 2005; Portland LumberJax
- NLL teams: Toronto Rock; Philadelphia Wings; Edmonton Rush; Portland LumberJax; San Diego Seals
- MLL draft: 3rd overall, 2005; Baltimore Bayhawks
- MLL teams: Hamilton Nationals; Rochester Rattlers; Baltimore Bayhawks; Boston Cannons
- PLL teams: Chaos; Waterdogs; Cannons
- MSL team: Brampton Excelsiors
- Pro career: 2005–2024

Career highlights
- NCAA: 2x USILA First Team All-American (2004-05); 2x Tewaaraton Award nominee (2004-05); 2x First Team All-ECAC (2004-05); USILA Schmeisser Award (2005); ECAC Defensive Player of the Year (2005); MLL: 3x MLL Champion (2005, 2008, 2009); MLL Rookie of the Year (2005); 7x MLL All-Star; 6x MLL Defensive Player of the Year (2006-11); NLL: Rookie of the Year (2006); Defensive Player of the Year (2006); 3x Transition Player of the Year (2009-10, 2017); 9x All Pro; San Diego Seals No. 17 retired; PLL: PLL All-Star (2019); Jimmy Regan Teammate Award (2022); LSM of the Year Award named in his honor**; All-Time Lacrosse Records: Most career ground balls, PLL/MLL; Most career loose balls, NLL; Most career Defensive Player of the Year awards; Most career games played, PLL/MLL; Most seasons played in a career; International: 2x World Lacrosse Championships Best Defenseman (2006, 2010); 3x All World Team (2006, 2010, 2014)
Medal record
Representing Canada
Men's lacrosse
World Lacrosse Championship
Gold medal – first place	2006 London
Gold medal – first place	2014 Denver
Silver medal – second place	2010 Manchester
Silver medal – second place	2018 Netanya
Silver medal – second place	2023 San Diego
World Indoor Lacrosse Championship
Gold medal – first place	2007 Halifax
Gold medal – first place	2011 Prague
Gold medal – first place	2015 Onondaga

Brodie Merrill (born November 5, 1981) is a Canadian former professional lacrosse player. Merrill is recognized by the Premier Lacrosse League as having revolutionized the LSM position, and is the namesake for the Brodie Merrill Long Stick Midfielder of the Year Award, being the only active PLL player to have an award named after them. Merrill is widely regarded as one of the greatest defensemen in lacrosse history, in both the indoor and outdoor game.

== Early life ==
Merrill was born in Montreal to Peter and Patricia, where he grew up playing hockey, soccer, and baseball. He has an older brother, Patrick, and a younger sister Tory. His family moved to Orangeville at the age of eight, in part due to the Quebec secession movement.

== High school career ==
Merrill attended the Salisbury School in Connecticut. While attending Salisbury, he was a standout lacrosse player, and was named the New England Defensive Player of the Year, was selected to the All-New England team, and was selected as a First Team High School All-American.

== College career ==
Merrill attended Georgetown University from 2002 to 2005. During his final two years, he was a First-team All-American, and won the Schmeisser Award in his senior year for defensive player of the year. During his final two seasons, Merrill was a Tewaaraton Award finalist, first team All-American and All-ECAC player, and won the William Corcoran Memorial Trophy for team MVP. Additionally, he was the ECAC Defensive Player of the Year in 2005 and finished his collegiate career with 250 ground balls, a Georgetown record for non-faceoff specialists.

== Professional career ==
=== NLL career ===
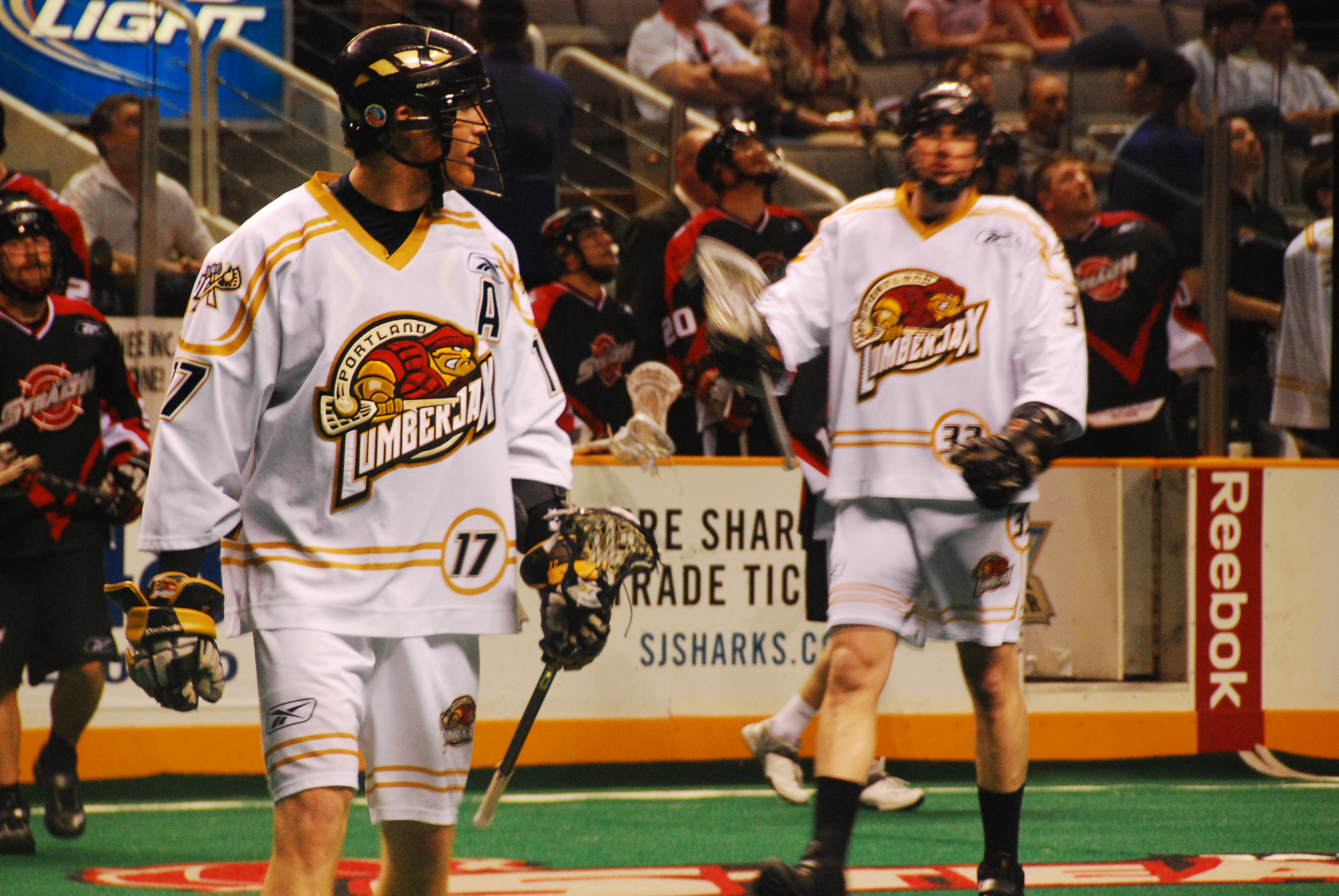
Merrill (left) in 2009

Merrill was the first player taken overall in the 2005 National Lacrosse League Draft by the Portland LumberJax, and in 2006 was named both the NLL's Rookie of the Year and Defensive Player of the Year. During the 2009 NLL season, he was named a starter to the All-Star Game.

When the LumberJax left Portland at the end of the 2009 season, the league held a dispersal draft. Merrill was selected with the first overall pick in the draft by the Edmonton Rush.

On August 9, 2011, he was traded to the Philadelphia Wings, along with Rush forwards Dean Hill, Mike McLellan, and Edmonton's 41st selection in the 2011 entry draft, and the 4th round selection in 2013. In return, Philadelphia sent Athan Iannucci with teammates Alex Turner and Brodie McDonald, along with Philadelphia's first-round draft picks in 2012, 2013 and 2014.

On November 29, 2018, Brodie was signed by the San Diego Seals where he was named captain. He played under his brother, head coach Patrick Merrill.

On February 22, 2020, Merrill became the NLL's all time loose ball leader.

Merrill announced his retirement from professional lacrosse on September 13, 2023. Merrill's number 17 jersey was retired by the Seals in a halftime ceremony during their opening game of the 2023–24 season. However, on March 15, 2024, it was announced that Merrill was placed on the active roster, and planned to finish the remainder of the 2024 season on the Seals. He played an additional two games with the Seals before again retiring.

=== MLL career ===
Merrill was the MLL Rookie of the Year in 2005 as a member of the Baltimore Bayhawks. From 2006 to 2007, he played for the Rochester Rattlers. For four consecutive years he was awarded the Major League Lacrosse Defensive Player of the Year Awards. He then helped the Toronto Nationals win their first MLL championship in their inaugural season, and won the defensive player of the year award for a record fourth consecutive year. Merrill is the all-time ground ball leader in the MLL.

=== PLL career ===
In 2019, Merrill joined Paul Rabil’s new Premier Lacrosse League as a member of the Chaos Lacrosse Club.

On March 11, 2021, Merrill was selected first overall by Cannons Lacrosse Club, the reincarnation of the Boston Cannons, in the PLL Expansion Draft.

Merrill played in his 200th professional field lacrosse game on August 21, 2021, the most of any player in history.

== Canadian Box career ==
=== Junior ===
Merrill played his junior lacrosse with the Orangeville Northmen of the OLA Junior A Lacrosse League. In 2000, Merrill lead the Northmen to a league championship. In 2001, Merrill was awarded the "John McCauley Award" for Best Defensive Player, and shared the "B.W. Evans Award" for Top Graduating Player with Dan Bowman the following year.

=== Senior ===
Merrill began his senior career with the Coquitlam Adanacs of the Western Lacrosse Association, and later the Brampton Excelsiors of Major Series Lacrosse, winning two consecutive Mann Cup championships (2008–2009). Merrill is currently playing for the Kahnawake Mohawks in the Quebec Senior Lacrosse League.

== International career ==
In 2006, he helped the Canadian national lacrosse team to an historic win at the World Lacrosse Championship in London, Ontario. He had an outstanding tournament, being named Best Defender and earning All-World honours.

== Personal ==
Brodie and his brother Patrick were a member of the Toronto Rock. Both Brodie and Patrick are members of the Brampton Excelsiors in the Major Series Lacrosse and both were members the Hamilton Nationals of Major League Lacrosse. Additionally, Patrick currently coaches Brodie with the San Diego Seals. He was named by Inside Lacrosse as "The Best Player in the World."-Inside Lacrosse. He is also the dean of students and head men's lacrosse coach at The Hill Academy in Caledon, Ontario. At a very young age, he was best friends with lacrosse player Kyle Miller. Both loved the game and chose to play together at the Salisbury School, a prep school in Connecticut, but went on to different colleges. Kyle and Brodie were reunited as teammates on the Canadian roster for the 2006 World Lacrosse Championships. Kyle was diagnosed in 2011 as having Osteosarcoma. He died on June 8, 2013. Brodie is the main editor for the online lacrosse magazine, Brodie Merrill Lacrosse.

Merrill is a fan of the Montreal Canadiens.

== Legacy ==
Merrill is regarded as one of the best players in the history of lacrosse. He is the NLL's all-time leader in loose balls with 2,778, and is tied with Greg Gurenlian for the most ground balls in the history of professional outdoor lacrosse with 1,120. His 200 games between MLL and PLL are also a record for a field lacrosse player. Additionally, Merrill is the highest scoring long stick in professional field lacrosse history, tallying 146 career points in MLL and PLL. He won the NLL Transition Player of the Year Award a record setting 3 times, and the MLL Defensive Player of the Year a record setting 6 times, all consecutive. Merrill revolutionized the LSM position with his offensive abilities, with the Premier Lacrosse League naming their award for the top LSM in the league after him.

== Statistics ==
=== NLL ===
Brodie Merrill		Regular season									Playoffs								
Season	Team	GP	G	A	Pts	LB	PIM	Pts/GP	LB/GP	PIM/GP	GP	G	A	Pts	LB	PIM	Pts/GP	LB/GP	PIM/GP
2006	Portland LumberJax	16	17	32	49	214	33	3.06	13.38	2.06	1	0	4	4	15	0	4.00	15.00	0.00
2007	Portland LumberJax	15	4	19	23	196	49	1.53	13.07	3.27	–	–	–	–	–	–	–	–	–
2008	Portland LumberJax	16	17	21	38	211	53	2.38	13.19	3.31	3	4	5	9	43	0	3.00	14.33	0.00
2009	Portland LumberJax	16	14	33	47	216	38	2.94	13.50	2.38	1	2	5	7	14	2	7.00	14.00	2.00
2010	Edmonton Rush	16	17	36	53	190	31	3.31	11.88	1.94	2	1	1	2	24	2	1.00	12.00	1.00
2011	Edmonton Rush	16	9	38	47	187	34	2.94	11.69	2.13	–	–	–	–	–	–	–	–	–
2012	Philadelphia Wings	16	17	15	32	157	29	2.00	9.81	1.81	1	3	0	3	7	2	3.00	7.00	2.00
2013	Philadelphia Wings	14	10	16	26	123	16	1.86	8.79	1.14	1	0	2	2	4	0	2.00	4.00	0.00
2014	Philadelphia Wings	18	8	26	34	189	29	1.89	10.50	1.61	–	–	–	–	–	–	–	–	–
2015	Toronto Rock	18	8	24	32	151	21	1.78	8.39	1.17	4	0	3	3	31	2	0.75	7.75	0.50
2016	Toronto Rock	18	4	12	16	180	54	0.89	10.00	3.00	–	–	–	–	–	–	–	–	–
2017	Toronto Rock	18	7	12	19	171	41	1.06	9.50	2.28	3	3	3	6	36	2	2.00	12.00	0.67
2018	Toronto Rock	17	6	16	22	127	33	1.29	7.47	1.94	–	–	–	–	–	–	–	–	–
2019	San Diego Seals	16	3	11	14	123	24	0.88	7.69	1.50	1	0	0	0	7	0	0.00	7.00	0.00
2020	San Diego Seals	12	2	10	12	95	19	1.00	7.92	1.58	–	–	–	–	–	–	–	–	–
2022	San Diego Seals	17	3	7	10	134	23	0.59	7.88	1.35	4	0	1	1	24	2	0.25	6.00	0.50
2023	San Diego Seals	17	2	12	14	116	56	0.82	6.82	3.29	1	0	0	0	9	0	0.00	9.00	0.00
2024	San Diego Seals	2	0	1	1	11	2	0.50	5.50	1.00	–	–	–	–	–	–	–	–	–
		278	148	341	489	2,791	585	1.76	10.04	2.10	22	13	24	37	214	12	1.68	9.73	0.55
Career Total:		300	161	365	526	3,005	597	1.75	10.02	1.99									

GP–Games played; G–Goals; A–Assists; Pts–Points; LB–Loose balls; PIM–Penalty minutes; Pts/GP–Points per games played; LB/GP–Loose balls per games played; PIM/GP–Penalty minutes per games played.

=== Premier Lacrosse League ===
Season	Team	Regular season											Playoffs										
Season	Team	GP	G	2PG	A	Pts	Sh	GB	Pen	PIM	FOW	FOA	GP	G	2PG	A	Pts	Sh	GB	Pen	PIM	FOW	FOA
2019	Chaos	10	0	0	0	0	1	36	0	0	0	0	2	0	0	0	0	0	4	0	0	0	0
2020	Waterdogs	5	0	0	0	0	0	10	2	1	0	0	–	–	–	–	–	–	–	–	–	–	–
2021	Cannons	9	0	0	0	0	0	40	2	2	0	0	1	0	0	0	0	0	2	0	0	0	0
2022	Cannons	6	0	0	1	1	0	15	2	1.5	0	0	–	–	–	–	–	–	–	–	–	–	–
		30	0	0	1	1	1	101	6	4.5	0	0	3	0	0	0	0	0	6	0	0	0	0
Career total:		33	0	0	1	1	1	107	6	4.5	0	0											

GP–Games played; G–Goals; 2PG–2-point goals; A–Assists; Pts–Points; Sh–Shots; GB–Ground balls; Pen–Penalties; PIM–Penalty minutes; FOW–Faceoffs won; FOA–Faceoffs attempted

=== Major League Lacrosse ===
Season	Team	Regular season											Playoffs										
Season	Team	GP	G	2PG	A	Pts	Sh	GB	Pen	PIM	FOW	FOA	GP	G	2PG	A	Pts	Sh	GB	Pen	PIM	FOW	FOA
2005	Baltimore Bayhawks	11	3	0	1	4	8	52	0	2	0	0	2	1	0	0	1	2	0	0	0	0	0
2006	Rochester Rattlers	11	6	1	5	12	17	95	0	9	0	1	–	–	–	–	–	–	–	–	–	–	–
2007	Rochester Rattlers	12	5	0	9	14	14	101	0	5	0	0	–	–	–	–	–	–	–	–	–	–	–
2008	Rochester Rattlers	10	6	0	12	18	10	75	0	4.5	0	0	–	–	–	–	–	–	–	–	–	–	–
2009	Toronto Nationals	12	8	0	12	20	20	69	0	5.5	3	11	2	1	0	1	2	2	14	0	0.5	0	0
2010	Toronto Nationals	10	3	0	9	12	13	55	0	2.5	1	3	–	–	–	–	–	–	–	–	–	–	–
2011	Hamilton Nationals	12	4	1	12	17	14	77	0	7.5	0	1	2	1	0	0	1	1	13	0	0.5	0	0
2012	Hamilton Nationals	13	4	1	6	11	21	96	0	5.5	0	0	–	–	–	–	–	–	–	–	–	–	–
2013	Hamilton Nationals	13	2	0	9	11	16	91	0	4.5	0	3	1	1	0	0	1	1	11	0	3	0	0
2014	Boston Cannons	13	4	0	1	5	7	62	0	3.5	0	0	–	–	–	–	–	–	–	–	–	–	–
2015	Boston Cannons	7	0	0	2	2	2	33	0	1.5	0	0	1	0	0	0	0	0	2	0	0	0	0
2016	Boston Cannons	13	3	1	0	4	4	60	0	1	0	0	–	–	–	–	–	–	–	–	–	–	–
2017	Boston Cannons	9	1	0	4	5	3	39	0	1.5	0	2	–	–	–	–	–	–	–	–	–	–	–
2018	Boston Cannons	11	1	0	0	1	6	49	0	2	0	0	–	–	–	–	–	–	–	–	–	–	–
		157	50	4	82	136	155	954	0	55.5	4	21	8	4	0	1	5	6	40	0	4	0	0
Career total:		165	54	4	83	141	161	994	0	59.5	4	21											

GP–Games played; G–Goals; 2PG–2-point goals; A–Assists; Pts–Points; Sh–Shots; GB–Ground balls; Pen–Penalties; PIM–Penalty minutes; FOW–Faceoffs won; FOA–Faceoffs attempted

=== Canadian Lacrosse Association ===
			Regular Season					Playoffs
Season	Team	League	GP	G	A	Pts	PIM	GP	G	A	Pts	PIM
1997	Orangeville Northmen	OLA Jr.A	1	0	0	0	0	0	0	0	0	0
1998	Orangeville Northmen	OLA Jr.A	20	8	9	17	44	9	1	2	3	8
1999	Orangeville Northmen	OLA Jr.A	15	13	20	33	20	10	6	25	31	10
2000	Orangeville Northmen	OLA Jr.A	14	21	24	45	32	14	13	30	43	19
Minto Cup	Orangeville Northmen	CLA	--	--	--	--	--	6	3	11	14	4
2001	Orangeville Northmen	OLA Jr.A	14	20	33	53	49	5	7	7	14	15
2002	Orangeville Northmen	OLA Jr.A	14	16	15	31	30	11	8	14	22	31
2003	Coquitlam Adanacs	WLA	14	6	12	18	41	10	5	7	12	25
2004	Brampton Excelsiors	MSL	6	2	7	9	21	14	8	9	17	56
2006	Brampton Excelsiors	MSL	7	7	12	19	6	11	7	14	21	27
2007	Brampton Excelsiors	MSL	4	4	1	5	4	9	12	17	29	12
2008	Brampton Excelsiors	MSL	4	0	9	9	10	9	4	10	14	21
Mann Cup	Brampton Excelsiors	CLA	--	--	--	--	--	4	2	3	5	13
2009	Brampton Excelsiors	MSL	7	7	6	13	12	9	3	5	8	31
Mann Cup	Brampton Excelsiors	CLA	--	--	--	--	--	7	2	2	4	14
Junior A Totals			78	78	86	164	175	49	35	78	113	83
Minto Cup Totals			--	--	--	--	--	6	3	11	14	4
Senior A Totals			42	26	47	73	94	62	39	62	101	172
Mann Cup Totals			--	--	--	--	--	11	4	5	9	27

== Awards ==
Preceded by Ryan Boyle	MLL Rookie of the Year; 2005	Succeeded by Matt Ward
Preceded by Ryan Boyle	NLL Rookie of the Year; 2006	Succeeded by Ryan Benesch
Preceded by Andrew Turner	NLL Defensive Player of the Year; 2006	Succeeded by Ryan Cousins
Preceded by Nicky Polanco	MLL Defensive Player of the Year; 2006-2011	Succeeded by Lee Zink
Preceded by Mark Steenhuis	NLL Transition Player of the Year; 2009, 2010	Succeeded by Jeff Shattler
Preceded by Brad Self	NLL Transition Player of the Year; 2017	Succeeded by Joey Cupido
Preceded by Colin Doyle	Toronto Rock captain 2017-2018	Succeeded by Challen Rogers
