= Zach Currier =

Canadian lacrosse player (born 1994)

Personal information
- Nationality: Canadian
- Born: 30 May 1994 (age 32)
- Height: 6 ft 0 in (183 cm)
- Weight: 180 lb (82 kg; 12 st 12 lb)

Sport
- Position: Midfield (field), Transition (box)
- Shoots: Left
- NCAA team: Princeton (2017)
- NLL draft: 3rd overall, 2017; Calgary Roughnecks
- NLL team Former teams: San Diego Seals; Calgary Roughnecks
- MLL draft: 6th overall, 2017; Denver Outlaws
- MLL teams: Denver Outlaws
- PLL team: Waterdogs LC
- Pro career: 2017–

Career highlights
- NCAA: 2x First Team All-Ivy (2016-17); 1x First Team All-America (2017); 1x Honorable Mention All-America (2016); NLL: 1x Champion (2019); 3x Transition Player of the Year (2022-23, 2026); Single season record for caused turnovers (62, 2022); 3x All-League First Team (2022-23, 2026); 2x All-League Second Team (2018,2019); All Rookie Team (2018); MLL: 1x Champion (2018); 3x All-Star (2017-19); PLL: 2x PLL Champion (2022, 2026); 2× Gait Brothers Midfielder of the Year (2021, 2026); 4x First Team All-Pro (2021-23, 2026); 2x Second Team All-Pro (2024, 2025); 5x All-Star (2019, 2021-2023, 2026)
Medal record
Representing Canada
Men's field lacrosse
World Lacrosse Championship
Runner-up	2018 Netanya
Runner-up	2023 San Diego
Box lacrosse
World Indoor Lacrosse Championship
Winner	2019 Langley
Winner	2024 Utica

Zach Currier is a Canadian professional lacrosse player who currently plays as a midfielder for the Philadelphia Waterdogs of the Premier Lacrosse League (PLL) and as a transition player for the San Diego Seals of the National Lacrosse League (NLL). He previously played for the Calgary Roughnecks of the NLL.

== Early life and career ==
A native of Peterborough, Ontario, Currier has two older brothers, Josh, who is also a professional lacrosse player, and Andrei, and a younger sister, Grace. He is the son of Roger Currier and Michelle Dunn. He initially began playing lacrosse at the age of eight as a way to toughen him up for hockey. He attended Culver Military Academy for high school.

== College career ==
Currier attended Princeton University where he played four years of lacrosse, playing in all situations. As a senior, he led the nation in assists (34) and points (58) among midfielders, earning first team All-American honors. Additionally, he led the Tigers in caused turnovers in both of his last two seasons. Currier graduated second all-time in ground balls at Princeton with 302.

== Professional career ==
=== NLL ===
Currier was drafted 3rd overall by the Calgary Roughnecks in 2017, winning a championship in his second season. During the 2022 season, Currier broke the NLL record for caused turnovers in a season with 62, while also collecting 237 loose balls, the most in a single season for any player who was not a primary faceoff taker, with Inside Lacrosse considering this potentially the best season ever for a transition player. He was named the NLL Transition Player of the Year

Heading into the 2023 NLL season, Inside Lacrosse named Currier the #1 best defender in the NLL.

Currier was named the 2023 NLL Transition Player of the Year, becoming the fourth player to win the award in consecutive years, and fifth to win the award twice, also being named first team All-NLL.

Currier has been the president of the NLL Players' Association since 2020.

On 11 July 2024 Currier was traded to the Seals in exchange for former teammate Curtis Dickson also included in the deal to San Diego was Calgary's 14th overall selection in the 2024 Entry Draft, and Calgary's second-round selection in the 2026 Entry Draft. Calgary also received San Diego's fourth round selection in the 2024 Entry Draft.

Currier was named Transition Player of the Year for a third time in 2026.

=== MLL ===
Currier was selected 6th overall by the Denver Outlaws in the 2017 MLL Draft, winning the championship in his second year.

=== PLL ===
Currier elected to defect from MLL to the Premier Lacrosse League ahead of the 2020 season, being taken first overall in the PLL Entry Draft by Waterdogs Lacrosse Club. He won the Gait Brothers Midfielder of the Year Award in the 2021 season, as well as being a finalist for the Jim Brown MVP Award, having led the Waterdogs in scoring from midfield with 11 goals and 11 assists, as well as leading all non-faceoff specialists in the PLL in ground balls with 51. In the 2022 season, Currier once again led all non-faceoff specialists in ground balls with 53, with his closest competitor having only 38, as Waterdogs won their first PLL Championship.

== Off the field ==
Currier graduated with an engineering degree from Princeton and works for Warrior, helping design lacrosse equipment.

== Style of play ==
Currier is regarded as a "throwback" player, as he is a two-way midfielder equally capable of playing offense, defense, and taking faceoffs, a rarity in modern lacrosse. The Premier lacrosse League considers Currier as the best two-way player in the world, noting his ability to pick up ground balls and be an effective faceoff wing, while being able to push transition play and beat defenders.

== Statistics ==
=== NCAA ===
Season	Team	GP	GS	G	A	Pts	GB	CT	FOW	FOA
2014	Princeton	13	1	6	4	10	16	2	3	10
2017	Princeton	15	13	11	14	25	81	17	55	123
2017	Princeton	12	9	14	17	31	75	15	43	101
2017	Princeton	15	15	24	34	58	130	21	114	202
Total		55	38	55	69	124	302	55	215	436

=== NLL ===
Zach Currier		Regular season									Playoffs								
Season	Team	GP	G	A	Pts	LB	PIM	Pts/GP	LB/GP	PIM/GP	GP	G	A	Pts	LB	PIM	Pts/GP	LB/GP	PIM/GP
2018	Calgary Roughnecks	18	9	13	22	200	10	1.22	11.11	0.56	2	0	0	0	14	0	0.00	7.00	0.00
2019	Calgary Roughnecks	18	6	16	22	199	16	1.22	11.06	0.89	4	1	2	3	40	6	0.75	10.00	1.50
2020	Calgary Roughnecks	10	3	2	5	108	8	0.50	10.80	0.80	–	–	–	–	–	–	–	–	–
2022	Calgary Roughnecks	18	10	9	19	237	14	1.06	13.17	0.78	1	0	0	0	13	0	0.00	13.00	0.00
2023	Calgary Roughnecks	18	15	18	33	228	14	1.83	12.67	0.78	4	5	3	8	54	2	2.00	13.50	0.50
2024	Calgary Roughnecks	18	1	16	17	184	18	0.94	10.22	1.00	–	–	–	–	–	–	–	–	–
2025	San Diego Seals	17	18	29	47	193	20	2.76	11.35	1.18	1	2	0	2	12	2	2.00	12.00	2.00
2026	San Diego Seals	18	22	35	57	200	18	3.17	11.11	1.00	4	8	12	20	49	4	5.00	12.25	1.00
		135	84	138	222	1,549	118	1.64	11.47	0.87	16	16	17	33	182	14	2.06	11.38	0.88
Career Total:		151	100	155	255	1,731	132	1.69	11.46	0.87									

GP–Games played; G–Goals; A–Assists; Pts–Points; LB–Loose balls; PIM–Penalty minutes; Pts/GP–Points per games played; LB/GP–Loose balls per games played; PIM/GP–Penalty minutes per games played.

=== MLL ===
Season	Team	Regular season											Playoffs										
Season	Team	GP	G	2PG	A	Pts	Sh	GB	Pen	PIM	FOW	FOA	GP	G	2PG	A	Pts	Sh	GB	Pen	PIM	FOW	FOA
2017	Denver Outlaws	9	11	0	15	26	38	32	0	1	1	4	2	2	0	5	7	3	4	0	0	0	0
2018	Denver Outlaws	7	12	0	10	22	27	30	0	4	0	0	–	–	–	–	–	–	–	–	–	–	–
2019	Denver Outlaws	13	18	1	17	36	72	47	5	8	0	0	–	–	–	–	–	–	–	–	–	–	–
		29	41	1	42	84	137	109	5	13	1	4	2	2	0	5	7	3	4	0	0	0	0
Career total:		31	43	1	47	91	140	113	5	13	1	4											

GP–Games played; G–Goals; 2PG–2-point goals; A–Assists; Pts–Points; Sh–Shots; GB–Ground balls; Pen–Penalties; PIM–Penalty minutes; FOW–Faceoffs won; FOA–Faceoffs attempted

=== PLL ===
Season	Team	Regular season											Playoffs										
Season	Team	GP	G	2PG	A	Pts	Sh	GB	Pen	PIM	FOW	FOA	GP	G	2PG	A	Pts	Sh	GB	Pen	PIM	FOW	FOA
2020	Waterdogs	7	4	0	3	7	8	20	0	0	0	0	–	–	–	–	–	–	–	–	–	–	–
2021	Waterdogs	9	11	0	11	22	40	51	0	0	1	7	1	1	0	0	1	4	1	0	0	0	0
2022	Waterdogs	10	11	0	8	19	28	53	3	2.5	3	31	3	3	0	2	5	10	16	1	2	0	0
2023	Waterdogs	10	5	0	9	14	28	50	0	0	34	58	3	5	0	2	7	13	24	0	0	30	48
2024	Philadelphia Waterdogs	10	11	1	7	19	25	34	1	0.5	8	46	–	–	–	–	–	–	–	–	–	–	–
2025	Philadelphia Waterdogs	10	8	0	3	11	30	38	2	2	1	10	2	1	0	0	1	6	12	0	0	2	2
2026	Philadelphia Waterdogs	11	2	0	11	13	10	68	2	1.5	6	13	2	2	0	0	2	3	18	0	0	2	2
		67	52	1	52	105	169	314	8	6.5	53	165	11	12	0	4	16	30	71	1	2	34	52
Career total:		78	64	1	56	121	199	385	9	8.5	87	217											

GP–Games played; G–Goals; 2PG–2-point goals; A–Assists; Pts–Points; Sh–Shots; GB–Ground balls; Pen–Penalties; PIM–Penalty minutes; FOW–Faceoffs won; FOA–Faceoffs attempted
