= Oshawa FireWolves =

NLL professional box lacrosse team

- Sport: Box lacrosse
- First season: 2025-26
- League: National Lacrosse League
- Team history: Philadelphia Wings (1987–2014); New England Black Wolves (2015–2020); Albany FireWolves (2021–2025)
- Location: Oshawa, Ontario
- Arena: Tribute Communities Centre
- Colours: Maroon, Tan, White
- Owner: Oliver Marti and others
- Head coach: Glenn Clark
- General manager: Glenn Clark
- Website: oshawafirewolves.com

The Oshawa FireWolves are a Canadian professional box lacrosse team based in Oshawa, Ontario, that competes in the National Lacrosse League (NLL). The team plays its home games at Tribute Communities Centre, which is also the home arena of the Oshawa Generals of the Ontario Hockey League. The FireWolves began play in the 2025–26 season.

== History ==
On August 14, 2025, the City of Oshawa announced a $50 million renovation project to the Tribute Communities Centre set to begin in 2027 which would expand seating capacity to 7,000 seats. On August 18, 2025, reports from local and national sports media surfaced that the Albany FireWolves would relocate to Oshawa prior to the start of the 2026 NLL season. The team declined to comment when inquired about the reports. However, the following day, on August 19, the NLL would officially announced the FireWolves' relocation to Oshawa, where they were temporarily be known as the FireWolves Lacrosse Club.

On September 9, the FireWolves announced they would be known as the Oshawa FireWolves.

== Current roster ==
Oshawa FireWolves roster
Active (21-man) roster		Inactive roster	Coaches
Goaltenders: 29 (Canada) Andrew Kidd; 30 (Haudenosaunee) Doug Jamieson; Defensemen: 11 (Canada) Jackson Nishimura; 14 (Canada) Nicholas Volkov; 16 (Canada) Zac Masson; 22 (Canada) Nick Chaykowsky; 24 (Canada) Zachary Young; 27 (Canada) Mike Byrne; 37 (Canada) Ethan O'Connor; 77 (Canada) John Wagner; 91 (United States) Joe Nardella	Forwards: 2 (Canada) Tye Kurtz; 6 (Canada) Alex Simmons; 7 (Canada) Ben MacDonnell; 41 (United States) John Piatelli; 47 (Canada) Kyle Jackson; 51 (Canada) Dyson Williams; 57 (Canada) Ethan Walker; 94 (Canada) Sam Firth; Transition: 15 (Haudenosaunee) Blake Gibson-McDonald; 17 (Canada) Colton Watkinson; 19 (Canada) Patrick Kaschalk; 43 (Canada) Will Johansen	Practice squad: 20 (Canada) Jackson Raposo; 21 (Canada) Johnathan Peshko; 31 (Canada) Cameron Pilon; 45 (Canada) Carson Moyer	Head coach Glenn Clark Legend: * Suspended list; (C) Captain; (A) Alternate captain; updated 2025-03-28; NLL Transactions

== All-time record ==
Season	Conference	W–L	Finish	Home	Road	GF	GA	Coach	Playoffs
2026	Unified	6–12	13th	4–5	2–7	179	212	Glenn Clark	Did not qualify
Total	1 season	6–12		4–5	2–7	179	212		
Playoff Totals	0 appearances	–		–	–	–	–	0 Championships	

== Draft history ==
The following lists Oshawa FireWolves first-round selections in the NLL Entry Draft.

Year	Player(s) selected
2025	None
