= 2015 NLL season =

- League: National Lacrosse League
- Sport: Indoor lacrosse
- Duration: January 2 – June 5, 2015
- Games: 18
- Teams: 9

Draft
- Top draft pick: Ben McIntosh
- Picked by: Edmonton Rush

Regular Season
- Top seed: Toronto Rock
- Season MVP: Shawn Evans (Calgary Roughnecks)
- Top scorer: Shawn Evans (Calgary Roughnecks)

Playoffs
- Finals champions: Edmonton Rush (1st title)
- Runners-up: Toronto Rock
- Finals MVP: Mark Matthews (Rush)

NLL seasons
- ← 2014 season 2016 season →

The 2015 National Lacrosse League season, the 29th in the history of the NLL, began on January 2, 2015, and ended with Game 2 of the Champion's Cup Finals series on June 5, 2015. In the finals, the Edmonton Rush defeated the Toronto Rock two games to none to win their first-ever Champion's Cup.

== Teams ==
2015 National Lacrosse League
Division	Team	City	Arena	Capacity
East	Buffalo Bandits	Buffalo, New York	First Niagara Center	19,070
East	Minnesota Swarm	Saint Paul, Minnesota	XCEL Energy Center	18,064
East	New England Black Wolves	Uncasville, Connecticut	Mohegan Sun Arena	7,074
East	Rochester Knighthawks	Rochester, New York	Blue Cross Arena	10,662
East	Toronto Rock	Toronto, Ontario	Air Canada Centre	18,800
West	Calgary Roughnecks	Calgary, Alberta	Scotiabank Saddledome	19,289
West	Colorado Mammoth	Denver, Colorado	Pepsi Center	18,007
West	Edmonton Rush	Edmonton, Alberta	Rexall Place	16,839
West	Vancouver Stealth	Langley, British Columbia	Langley Events Centre	5,276

=== Map of teams ===
East Division West Division

== Milestones and events ==
=== Pre-season ===
- August 5, 2014: The Philadelphia Wings announced that they have been purchased and will be moving to Connecticut, to play at the Mohegan Sun arena. In September, it was announced that the team would be known as the New England Black Wolves.
- September 21, 2014: The league announces the winners of 2014's annual awards. Winners include Cody Jamieson (MVP), Logan Schuss (Rookie of the Year), Matt Vinc (Goaltender of the Year), and Derek Keenan (Les Bartley Award and GM of the Year)
- September 22, 2014: The league announced that the Champion's Cup finals will expand to a best-of-three series for 2015. In 2014, a two-game series with a deciding "mini-game" was used.
- September 22, 2014: The Rochester Knighthawks traded young star Johnny Powless along with Joel McCready and two 2014 draft picks to the Vancouver Stealth for two 2014 draft picks and first round picks in 2015 and 2017.
- October 23, 2014: The Vancouver Stealth announced that team captain Kyle Sorensen would miss the entire 2015 season due to knee surgery. Less than a week later, the Toronto Rock announced that their captain Colin Doyle would also miss the season due to a shoulder injury.
- November 21, 2014: Scott Ranger announced his retirement from the NLL after eight seasons.
- November 27, 2014: Toronto Rock GM Terry Sanderson died of a heart attack at age 62.
- December 7, 2014: Former league commissioner Jim Jennings died of long-standing cancer at age 53.
- December 11, 2014: Stealth forward Johnny Powless is announced as a finalist in the voting for the Lou Marsh Trophy, given annually to Canada's top athlete. In 2014, Powless won the NLL Championship with the Rochester Knighthawks, the Mann Cup with the Six Nations Arrows, and the Minto Cup with the Six Nations Arrows.
- December 15, 2014: The Edmonton Rush announced that head coach and GM Derek Keenan would be taking an indefinite leave of absence for personal reasons. Keenan's wife Wendy had suffered from cancer for a year, and died on January 3, 2015.
- December 21, 2014: Former Vancouver Stealth and Calgary Roughnecks head coach and NLL Hall of Famer Chris Hall died of cancer. Hall missed the entire 2012 season due to his illness, but returned in 2013. He retired after the 2014 season and was named to the NLL Hall of Fame in the Class of 2014.

=== Regular season ===
- January 21, 2015: The Edmonton Rush announce that Derek Keenan would resume his head coaching duties beginning with their game in Calgary on January 24.
- March 28, 2015: The Toronto Rock clinched a playoff berth with a 12–10 road win against the Calgary Roughnecks which gave them an 11–3 record. It is the sixth straight playoff appearance for the Rock.
- March 30, 2015: The Minnesota Swarm traded captain Andrew Suitor to the New England Black Wolves in exchange for their captain Joel White as well as a 2017 second round draft pick.
- April 4, 2015: With a record of 11–4, the Toronto Rock clinched no worse than home-floor advantage for the division semifinals when the Buffalo Bandits lost at home to the New England Black Wolves, 12–11.
- April 4, 2015: The Edmonton Rush clinched a playoff berth and no worse than home-floor advantage for the division semifinals with a 17–10 road win over the Vancouver Stealth which gave the Rush a 9–4 record. It is the fourth straight playoff appearance for the Rush.
- April 4, 2015: With a record of 8–6, the Colorado Mammoth clinched a playoff berth when the Vancouver Stealth lost at home to the Edmonton Rush, 17–10. It is the fifth straight playoff appearance for the Mammoth.
- April 10, 2015: With a record of 8–6, the Colorado Mammoth clinched no worse than home-floor advantage for the division semifinals when the Vancouver Stealth lost, 14–7, on the road to the Toronto Rock. It will be the first home playoff game for the Mammoth since 2012.
- April 11, 2015: The Rochester Knighthawks clinched a playoff berth with a 14–5 win at home against the Colorado Mammoth which gave the Knighthawks a 10–4 record. It is the fourth straight playoff appearance for the Knighthawks.
- April 11, 2015: The Minnesota Swarm was eliminated from playoff contention when its record dropped to 5–10 with a 12–9 home loss to the Buffalo Bandits. It is the second straight season the Swarm has missed the playoffs.
- April 18, 2015: The Edmonton Rush clinched the top seed in the West Division and a bye to the West Division Finals with a record of 11–5 when it beat the Colorado Mammoth at home, 13–12. It is the second consecutive first-place finish for the Rush.
- April 18, 2015: The Rochester Knighthawks clinched no worse than home-floor advantage for the division semifinals when they improved their record to 11–5 with a 13–9 win on the road against the Vancouver Stealth.
- April 25, 2015: The New England Black Wolves were eliminated from playoff contention with a 14–6 road loss to the Rochester Knighthawks that dropped their record to 4–11. The Black Wolves' loss clinched a playoff berth for the Buffalo Bandits with a record of 8–7. Seven minutes later, the Bandits improved to 9–7 when they completed a 17–9 home victory over the Vancouver Stealth.
- May 1, 2015: The Toronto Rock clinched the top seed in the East Division, a bye to the East Division Finals and the best overall record in NLL with a 10–7 road victory over the New England Black Wolves in their final regular-season game.
- May 2, 2015: The Calgary Roughnecks defeated the Vancouver Stealth on the road, 14–13, in a game that decided the final playoff berth in the West Division on the final day of the regular season. Jeff Shattler's goal with 5:11 remaining broke a 13–13 tie and provided the winning margin. After an 0–6 start to their season, the Roughnecks went 7–5 in their final 12 games to secure the playoff berth.

=== Playoffs ===
- April 29, 2015: With Rexall Place unavailable for the weekend of May 21–24, the Edmonton Rush had requested permission to host Game 2 of the Western Conference Finals on Wednesday, May 20, and that request was approved by NLL. However, the Rush announced that, in the interest of the team's fans, it would give up its home-floor advantage and host Game 1 on Friday, May 15, with its opponent hosting Game 2. This means that if the series is tied, 1–1, after two games, the Rush's lower-seeded opponent would host the deciding mini-game.
- May 8, 2015: The Rochester Knighthawks defeated the Buffalo Bandits at home, 14–11, in an East Division Semifinal game. After the Bandits took the lead 26 seconds into the game, the Knighthawks answered with five straight goals in a span of less than nine minutes. The Bandits cut the Knighthawks' lead to one goal at 7–6 late in the second quarter. But Rochester responded with a goal 23 seconds later to take a two-goal lead to halftime. After a Buffalo power play goal early in the third quarter cut the Bandits' deficit to one goal at 8–7, the Knighthawks got three straight goals from Joe Resetarits in a span of less than six minutes to increase their advantage to 11–7. The Bandits never got closer than two goals the rest of the way. Resetarits finished with four goals and was named the game's first star. Cody Jamieson had two goals and seven assists and picked up nine loose balls for the Knighthawks to earn second star honors. Dhane Smith had three goals and four assists and picked up six loose balls in a losing effort and was named the third star. Matt Vinc had 44 saves in earning the win for the Knighthawks. The Bandits had won four straight and seven of their previous nine games entering the contest.
- May 9, 2015: The Calgary Roughnecks defeated the Colorado Mammoth on the road, 11–6, in a West Division Semifinal game. With the score tied, 1–1, in the latter part of the first quarter, the Roughnecks scored four straight goals to take a 5–1 lead less than five minutes into the second quarter. Two Mammoth goals cut the Colorado deficit to two. But Calgary responded 28 seconds later with the first of two goals in a 37-second span to take a 7–3 halftime lead. The teams exchanged two goals each in the third quarter, and after the Mammoth scored early in the fourth quarter, the Roughnecks held a 9–6 lead. Calgary held Colorado off the scoreboard the rest of the way while the Roughnecks scored two goals of their own to complete the victory. The game was delayed 26 minutes with 7:06 remaining in the fourth quarter by a power surge caused by inclement weather in the Denver area that resulted in the arena lights going out. Roughnecks goaltender Frankie Scigliano had 45 saves to earn the win and first-star honors. Mammoth goaltender Alex Buque entered the game with 2:15 remaining in the second quarter and the Roughnecks leading, 7–3. He saved 19 of the 23 shots he faced and was named the second star. Shawn Evans had three goals and two assists and picked up eight loose balls to take third-star honors for the Roughnecks.
- May 15, 2015: The Edmonton Rush defeated the Calgary Roughnecks at home, 10–8, in Game 1 of the West Division Finals. The Rush shut out the Roughnecks in the first quarter and led 4–0 early in the second quarter. Calgary responded by scoring six of the next nine goals and trailed by only 7–6 after three quarters. After a power play goal put the Rush ahead, 8–6, the Roughnecks scored two goals in just over three minutes to tie the score at 8 with 3:12 to play. Just over a minute later, Ben McIntosh put the Rush ahead, 9–8, with 2:10 remaining. Edmonton added an insurance goal 37 seconds later to complete the scoring. Mark Matthews had three goals and four assists and picked up five loose balls to take first-star honors for the Rush. Winning goaltender Aaron Bold had 29 saves and was named the second star. Zack Greer had three goals and one assist for Edmonton and was the game's third star.
- May 16, 2015: The Rochester Knighthawks defeated the Toronto Rock at home, 10–9, in Game 1 of the East Division Finals. After the Rock opened the scoring, the Knighthawks responded with a run that put them in front, 5–1, early in the second quarter. Toronto regrouped and scored three goals in the final 4:12 of the first half to cut the deficit to 5–4. The final Toronto goal was scored as time expired in the half and was initially ruled good by the referee. Rochester challenged saying that the goal came too late. A review of the replay proved inconclusive, and the call on the field stood. The Rock tied the score early in the third quarter. Then the Knighthawks twice took one-goal leads only to see Toronto respond and tie the score. Rochester went ahead by two goals, 9–7, when Craig Point completed his hat trick with 7:24 remaining. But Brett Hickey replied for the Rock with two goals to give him a hat trick of his own and tie the score at 9 with 3:59 to play. Dan Dawson scored the winner for the Knighthawks with 36.1 seconds remaining. Brad Self had three goals and three assists and picked up 16 loose balls for the Knighthawks to earn first-star honors. Winning goaltender Matt Vinc had 35 saves and was named the game's second star. Brandon Miller had 47 saves in a losing effort and was the third star.
- May 23, 2015: The Toronto Rock defeated the Rochester Knighthawks, 11–8, and then went on to win the tiebreaker mini-game, 8–2, to win the East Division Championship in Toronto. In Game 2, the Rock took a 3–0 lead less than four minutes into the game. When Brett Hickey completed his hat trick late in the second quarter, the Rock had an 8–2 advantage. The Knighthawks played with an empty net in the closing moments of the first half and scored a goal to cut the deficit to 8–3. After Toronto opened the second half scoring, Rochester scored four straight goals and trailed by only 9–7 early in the fourth quarter. Less than two minutes after the Knighthawks had cut the Rock's lead to two goals, they surrendered a shorthanded goal scored by Josh Sanderson. Another goal by Stephan Leblanc completed his hat trick and gave the Rock an 11–7 lead. Stephen Keogh's sixth goal of the game on a late power play completed the scoring. In the ensuing tiebreaker mini-game, a roughing penalty assessed to Keogh with 45 seconds remaining in Game 2 carried over, and the Rock converted the power play 29 seconds into the game. In all, the Rock scored five goals on six shots in the first 4:13 against Matt Vinc who was pulled in favor of Angus Goodleaf. Goodleaf surrendered two more goals before the Knighthawks got on the board with two of their own. Patrick Merrill scored for the Rock on a penalty shot in the final minute to complete the victory. Brandon Miller had 48 saves over the two games for the Rock and was named the first star. Sanderson had three goals, two in the mini-game, and five assists on the night to take second-star honors. The third star was Rob Hellyer who had two goals and two assists in the mini-game and added another six assists in Game 2 for Toronto.
- May 23, 2015: The Edmonton Rush won the West Division Championship with a 4–1 road victory over the Calgary Roughnecks in the tiebreaker mini-game after dropping Game 2, 12–9. In Game 2, after the Roughnecks took a 3–0 lead in the first 7:26, the Rush responded with seven straight goals in the final 8:05 of the first quarter. Calgary dominated the second quarter, scoring six goals while holding Edmonton off the scoreboard, to take a 9–7 halftime lead. After the Rush scored the only goal of the third quarter, the Roughnecks restored their two-goal advantage when Shawn Evans completed his hat trick with less than seven minutes remaining. Just 1:21 later, Robert Church completed a hat trick of his own to cut Calgary's lead to 10–9. Curtis Dickson followed with his third and fourth goals of the game to complete the Roughnecks' victory. Goaltender Mike Poulin who entered the game in relief for the Roughnecks and had 31 saves while allowing only two goals was named the first star. Andrew McBride's defensive play and four loose balls earned him second-star honors. Dickson added two assists to his four goals and was the third star. In the ensuing mini-game, the Roughnecks opened the scoring inside the first two minutes. The Rush responded with two goals 46 seconds apart and took the lead before the five-minute mark. Edmonton added an insurance goal with less than three minutes remaining and an empty-net goal in the final minute to complete the victory. Mark Matthews had two goals and one assist in the mini-game to earn first-star honors. Rush goaltender Aaron Bold had six saves and was the second star of the mini-game. Dane Dobbie scored the Roughnecks' lone goal of the mini-game and was the third star.
- May 30, 2015: The Edmonton Rush won Game 1 of the Champion's Cup Finals on the road, 15–9, over the Toronto Rock. After the Rock scored two early goals to open the game, the Rush responded with five straight goals to close the first quarter and another to start the second quarter to take a 6–2 lead. Toronto answered with two goals in less than three minutes. But Edmonton again closed the quarter strong with three unanswered goals to take a 9–4 halftime lead. In a tight third quarter, the Rock managed to score four goals but surrendered three and still trailed, 12–8, heading to the final period. The Rush scored three goals in the first six minutes of the fourth quarter capped by Robert Church's goal which completed his hat trick. The Rock answered with a goal just over two minutes later but was unable to score again over the final seven minutes of the game. Mark Matthews had a hat trick and three assists for the Rush and was named the game's first star. Winning goaltender Aaron Bold had 39 saves and an assist to take second-star honors. The third star was Church who contributed three assists along with his hat trick.
- June 5, 2015: The Edmonton Rush completed its sweep of the Toronto Rock in the Champion's Cup Finals with an 11–10 home victory in Game 2 that gave the team its first-ever NLL title. During the first 29:59 of the game, the Rock took a one-goal lead four times, but the Rush answered with a goal to tie the game each time. Mark Matthews gave the Rush its first lead with a power play goal and Edmonton employing an extra attacker just before halftime. Less than two minutes into the third quarter, Matthews scored again to give the Rush a 6–4 lead. After the teams exchanged goals, the Rock scored three straight goals in a span of 3:23 to take an 8–7 lead. Less than two minutes later, Robert Church scored his second goal of the game to tie the score at 8 at the end of three quarters. Rob Hellyer scored his second goal of the game to give the Rock its sixth one-goal lead of the game, 9–8. But Matthews scored the next two goals, the first on a power play and the second, his fifth of the game, shorthanded, to give the Rush a 10–9 lead. Colin Doyle's second goal of the game with 2:18 remaining tied the score at 10. With just 1:02 left on the clock, Matthew Dinsdale scored the Champion's Cup-winning goal. The five goals and three assists registered by Matthews earned him first-star honors. Hellyer added four assists to his two goals and was named second star. Kyle Rubisch played stellar defense for the Rush and added and assist to take the third star. Matthews had a total of eight goals and six assists in the finals and was named Champion's Cup Finals Most Valuable Player. He also led all players in postseason points with 27 and goals with 13.

=== League business ===
- May 29, 2015: The Minnesota Swarm announced that the franchise has been relocated, with NLL approval, to the Atlanta metropolitan area where it will be known as the Georgia Swarm. The team has agreed in principle to sign a lease to play its home games at the Arena at Gwinnett Center in Duluth, Georgia.

== Final standings ==
East Division
P	Team	GP	W	L	PCT	GB	Home	Road	GF	GA	Diff	GF/GP	GA/GP
1	Toronto Rock – xyz	18	14	4	.778	0.0	7–2	7–2	230	185	+45	12.78	10.28
2	Rochester Knighthawks – x	18	12	6	.667	2.0	7–2	5–4	205	173	+32	11.39	9.61
3	Buffalo Bandits – x	18	11	7	.611	3.0	7–2	4–5	236	208	+28	13.11	11.56
4	Minnesota Swarm	18	6	12	.333	8.0	3–6	3–6	185	226	−41	10.28	12.56
5	New England Black Wolves	18	4	14	.222	10.0	2–7	2–7	186	249	−63	10.33	13.83

West Division
P	Team	GP	W	L	PCT	GB	Home	Road	GF	GA	Diff	GF/GP	GA/GP
1	Edmonton Rush – xy	18	13	5	.722	0.0	6–3	7–2	241	177	+64	13.39	9.83
2	Colorado Mammoth – x	18	9	9	.500	4.0	6–3	3–6	212	218	−6	11.78	12.11
3	Calgary Roughnecks – x	18	7	11	.389	6.0	4–5	3–6	212	217	−5	11.78	12.06
4	Vancouver Stealth	18	5	13	.278	8.0	3–6	2–7	211	265	−54	11.72	14.72

x: Clinched playoff berth; c: Clinched playoff berth by crossing over to another division; y: Clinched division; z: Clinched best regular season record; GP: Games Played
W: Wins; L: Losses; GB: Games back; PCT: Win percentage; Home: Record at Home; Road: Record on the Road; GF: Goals scored; GA: Goals allowed
Differential: Difference between goals scored and allowed; GF/GP: Average number of goals scored per game; GA/GP: Average number of goals allowed per game

=== Overall seeds ===
Team	Wins	Losses	Pct.	Seed
Toronto Rock	14	4	.778	1
Edmonton Rush	13	5	.722	2
Rochester Knighthawks	12	6	.667	3
Buffalo Bandits	11	7	.611	4
Colorado Mammoth	9	9	.500	5
Calgary Roughnecks	7	11	.389	6
Minnesota Swarm	6	12	.333	7
Vancouver Stealth	5	13	.278	8
New England Black Wolves	4	14	.222	9

== Regular-season results table ==
Abbreviation and Color Key: Buffalo Bandits - BUF • Calgary Roughnecks - CAL • Colorado Mammoth - COL Edmonton Rush - EDM • Minnesota Swarm - MIN • New England Black Wolves - NE Rochester Knighthawks - ROC • Toronto Rock - TOR • Vancouver Stealth - VAN Win • Loss • Home
Club	Match																	
Club	1	2	3	4	5	6	7	8	9	10	11	12	13	14	15	16	17	18
Buffalo Bandits	NE	EDM	VAN	TOR	MIN	ROC	CAL	ROC	ROC	COL	TOR	TOR	MIN	NE	MIN	VAN	NE	NE
Buffalo Bandits	8–12	9–8	14–13	11–13	15–12	11–17	15–14 (OT)	10–15	12–13 (OT)	14–10	15–12	10–11 (OT)	12–8	11–12	12–9	17–9	20–9	20–10
Calgary Roughnecks	VAN	COL	EDM	TOR	BUF	VAN	VAN	ROC	EDM	ROC	NE	TOR	COL	COL	EDM	EDM	MIN	VAN
Calgary Roughnecks	14–18	16–17 (OT)	8–16	11–12	14–15 (OT)	9–13	16–13	11–12	12–11 (OT)	7–13	20–9	10–12	8–9 (OT)	14–9	9–8	9–11	10–6	14–13
Colorado Mammoth	MIN	CAL	VAN	VAN	EDM	EDM	NE	BUF	TOR	MIN	VAN	VAN	CAL	CAL	ROC	ROC	EDM	EDM
Colorado Mammoth	20–13	17–16 (OT)	20–9	13–16	7–11	7–13	14–12	10–14	9–17	12–8	14–11	12–6	9–8 (OT)	9–14	5–14	11–10	12–13	10–13
Edmonton Rush	BUF	MIN	CAL	NE	COL	COL	TOR	CAL	VAN	TOR	ROC	VAN	VAN	CAL	CAL	COL	MIN	COL
Edmonton Rush	8–9	10–14	16–8	18–9	11–7	13–7	15–16 (OT)	11–12 (OT)	19–7	11–9	16–3	15–14 (OT)	17–10	8–9	11–9	13–12	16–12	13–10
Minnesota Swarm	COL	EDM	NE	BUF	ROC	TOR	TOR	VAN	NE	COL	BUF	NE	NE	ROC	BUF	CAL	EDM	ROC
Minnesota Swarm	13–20	14–10	19–13	12–15	7–6 (OT)	4–16	9–14	15–21	9–10	8–12	8–12	13–9	12–8	2–10	9–12	6–10	12–16	13–12 (OT)
New England Black Wolves	BUF	ROC	MIN	EDM	ROC	TOR	COL	MIN	CAL	MIN	MIN	BUF	VAN	TOR	ROC	BUF	TOR	BUF
New England Black Wolves	12–8	17–7	13–19	9–18	10–15	12–13 (OT)	12–14	10–9	9–20	9–13	8–12	12–11	9–11	12–15	6–14	9–20	7–10	10–20
Rochester Knighthawks	TOR	NE	TOR	BUF	MIN	BUF	NE	BUF	CAL	CAL	EDM	TOR	MIN	COL	COL	VAN	NE	MIN
Rochester Knighthawks	12–13	7–17	8–6	17–11	6–7 (OT)	15–10	15–10	13–12 (OT)	12–11	13–7	3–16	11–7	10–2	14–5	10–11	13–9	14–6	12–13 (OT)
Toronto Rock	ROC	VAN	BUF	ROC	CAL	MIN	MIN	NE	EDM	COL	BUF	BUF	EDM	CAL	ROC	VAN	NE	NE
Toronto Rock	13–12	20–11	13–11	6–8	12–11	16–4	14–9	13–12 (OT)	16–15 (OT)	17–9	12–15	11–10 (OT)	9–11	12–10	7–11	14–7	15–12	10–7
Vancouver Stealth	CAL	TOR	BUF	COL	COL	CAL	CAL	MIN	EDM	COL	COL	EDM	EDM	TOR	NE	ROC	BUF	CAL
Vancouver Stealth	18–14	11–20	13–14	9–20	16–13	13–9	13–16	21–15	7–19	11–14	6–12	14–15 (OT)	10–17	7–14	11–9	9–13	9–17	13–14

== Player statistics ==
=== Scoring leaders ===
Note: GP = Games played; G = Goals; A = Assists; Pts = Points; PIM = Penalty minutes; LB = Loose Balls The following players lead the league in regular season points at the conclusion of games played on May 3, 2015.

Player	Team	GP	G	A	Pts	PIM	LB
Shawn Evans	Calgary Roughnecks	18	47	83	130	39	96
Mark Matthews	Edmonton Rush	18	53	62	115	6	64
Ryan Benesch	Buffalo Bandits	18	55	58	113	6	99
Dhane Smith	Buffalo Bandits	18	39	68	107	11	75
Rhys Duch	Vancouver Stealth	18	41	62	103	10	63
Josh Sanderson	Toronto Rock	18	19	83	102	10	90
Mark Steenhuis	Buffalo Bandits	17	36	59	95	25	68
Curtis Dickson	Calgary Roughnecks	18	48	46	94	16	58
Adam Jones	Colorado Mammoth	16	51	42	93	16	73
Cody Jamieson	Rochester Knighthawks	18	36	56	92	40	67

=== Leading goaltenders ===
Note: GP = Games played; Mins = Minutes played; W = Wins; L = Losses: GA = Goals Allowed; SV% = Save Percentage; GAA = Goals against average

The following goaltenders lead the league at the conclusion regular season on May 3, 2015.

Player	Team	GP	MP	W	L	GA	SV%	GAA
Aaron Bold	Edmonton Rush	18	1016:54	12	5	160	.779	9.44
Matt Vinc	Rochester Knighthawks	18	1003:58	10	6	161	.803	9.62
Brandon Miller	Toronto Rock	18	654:10	8	2	113	.792	10.36
Frankie Scigliano	San Diego Seals	18	734:02	6	6	136	.773	11.12
Anthony Cosmo	Buffalo Bandits	17	1013:41	10	7	191	.780	11.31

== Playoffs ==
Division semifinals
East Division
E2	Rochester	14
E3	Buffalo	11
West Division
W2	Colorado	6
W3	Calgary	11

Division finals (3-game series)
E1	Toronto	2
E2	Rochester	1
W1	Edmonton	2
W3	Calgary	1

Finals (3-game series)
E1	Toronto	0
W1	Edmonton	2

=== Division semifinals ===
==== (E2) Rochester Knighthawks vs. (E3) Buffalo Bandits ====
May 8, 2015	Rochester Knighthawks	14–11 (5–2, 3–4, 4–3, 2–2)	Buffalo Bandits	Blue Cross Arena; Attendance: 6,526

Game reference

Matt Vinc
Goalies
Anthony Cosmo
Davide DiRuscio

	0–1	00:26 – Culp (D. Smith, Benesch)
Hall (Jamieson, D. Dawson) – 01:06	1–1
Resetarits (D. Dawson, Walters) – 01:36	2–1
Hall (Jamieson, B. Self) – 02:12	3–1
Jamieson (Walters) – 05:37	4–1
Hall (D. Dawson) (PP) – 09:50	5–1
	5–2	11:17 – Weiss (Steenhuis)
Vitarelli (Jamieson) – 15:55	6–2
	6–3	16:13 – D. Smith (Tavares, Jones)
	6–4	19:14 – Culp (Tavares, D. Smith)
Jamieson (B. Self, Evans) – 20:01	7–4
	7–5	24:17 – Benesch (D. Smith, Steenhuis) (PP)
	7–6	26:16 – Benesch (Steenhuis, D. Smith)
Vitarelli (Keogh, Walters) – 26:39	8–6
	8–7	32:28 – D. Smith (Tavares, Steenhuis) (PP)
Resetarits (Jamieson, D. Dawson) – 34:05	9–7
Resetarits (Jamieson) – 35:21	10–7
Resetarits (Kirk) – 39:43	11–7
	11–8	41:01 – Hill (Benesch)
	11–9	41:57 – Hill (Tavares, Benesch)
D. Dawson (Jamieson) (PP) – 43:37	12–9
	12–10	46:35 – Steenhuis (D. Smith, Jones)
Vitarelli (D. Dawson, Hall) – 48:09	13–10
	13–11	52:15 – D. Smith (Tavares, Benesch)
Keogh (Jamieson, Vitarelli) – 55:21	14–11

16 min
Penalties
27 min
55
Shots
55

==== (W2) Colorado Mammoth vs. (W3) Calgary Roughnecks ====
May 7, 2016	Colorado Mammoth	6–11 (1–2, 2–5, 2–2, 1–2)	Calgary Roughnecks	Pepsi Center; Attendance: 16,027

Game reference

Dillon Ward
Alex Buque
Goalies
Frankie Scigliano

	0–1	01:14 – Pollock (Shattler, Dobbie)
Westervelt (Grant, McLaughlin) (PP) – 07:06	1–1
	1–2	11:50 – Dickson (Evans, Dobbie) (PP)
	1–3	15:17 – Evans (Dickson, Snider) (SH)
	1–4	18:06 – Evans (Shattler)
	1–5	19:34 – Dobbie (Veltman)
McLaughlin (Westervelt) – 22:34	2–5
Noble (Grant, McLaughlin) (PP) – 26:40	3–5
	3–6	27:08 – Dickson (Shattler, Dobbie)
	3–7	27:45 – Evans (Shattler)
Cupido (Holding) – 30:12	4–7
	4–8	33:08 – Veltman (Dickson) (PP)
	4–9	37:34 – Dickson (Dobbie)
Noble (Westervelt) – 40:11	5–9
Grant (Holding) – 48:53	6–9
	6–10	49:19 – Veltman (Evans, MacRae)
	6–11	56:28 – Veltman (MacRae, Shattler)

18 min
Penalties
18 min
51
Shots
51

=== Division Finals (best of three) ===
==== (E1) Toronto Rock vs. (E2) Rochester Knighthawks ====
May 16, 2015	Rochester Knighthawks	10–9 (3–1, 2–3, 1–2, 4–3)	Toronto Rock	Blue Cross Arena; Attendance: 5,808

Game reference

Matt Vinc
Goalies
Brandon Miller

	0–1	02:02 – Hellyer (Crowley, Leblanc) (PP)
Point (Hall, Campbell) – 09:38	1–1
B. Self (Smith) – 12:09	2–1
Point (Hall, B. Self) – 13:58	3–1
B. Self (Vitarelli) – 16:00	4–1
Vitarelli (B. Self) – 19:30	5–1
	5–2	25:48 – Leblanc (Hickey, Gamble)
	5–3	27:44 – Doyle (Beirnes, Hickey)
	5–4	29:59 – Hickey
	5–5	34:25 – Beirnes (Crowley, Gamble)
	5–6	44:59 – Beirnes (Sanderson, Leblanc)
Hall (B. Self) – 36:02	6–6
	6–7	48:26 – Hellyer (Sanderson, Hickey)
Resetarits (D. Dawson, Hall) – 45:49	7–7
	7–8	52:40 – Hickey (Doyle, Leblanc) (SH)
	7–9	56:01 – Hickey (Hellyer)
B. Self – 50:44	8–9
Point (Hall, Vitarelli) – 52:36	9–9
D. Dawson (Point, Vitarelli) – 59:23	10–9

12 min
Penalties
4 min
57
Shots
44

May 23, 2015	Toronto Rock	8–2	Rochester Knighthawks	Air Canada Centre; Attendance: 10,210

Game reference

Brandon Miller
Goalies
Matt Vinc
Angus Goodleaf

Sanderson (Hickey, Leblanc) (PP) – 00:29	1–0
Sanderson (Hellyer, Hickey) – 01:13	2–0
Doyle (Crowley) – 03:02	3–0
Leblanc (Hellyer, Hickey) – 03:42	4–0
Crowley (Doyle, Sanderson) – 04:13	5–0
Hellyer (Hickey, Leblanc) – 04:45	6–0
Hellyer (Hickey, Beirnes) – 06:19	7–0
	7–1	06:40 – Resetarits (Point, Walters)
	7–2	08:14 – Walters (D. Dawson)
P. Merrill (PS) – 09:05	8–2

0 min
Penalties
2 min
11
Shots
7

May 23, 2015	Toronto Rock	11–8 (4–2, 4–1, 1–3, 2–2)	Rochester Knighthawks	Air Canada Centre; Attendance: 10,210

Game reference

Brandon Miller
Goalies
Matt Vinc

Hickey (Hellyer, Crowley) – 00:30	1–0
Hickey (Hellyer, Sanderson) – 01:36	2–0
Leblanc (Hellyer, Edwards) – 03:20	3–0
	3–1	04:13 – Keogh (B. Self, Evans)
Sorensen (Leblanc) – 08:05	4–1
	4–2	11:46 – Point (D. Dawson, Vitarelli)
Crowley (Leblanc, Doyle) (PP) – 18:17	5–2
Doyle (Beirnes, B. Merrill) – 20:05	6–2
Marshall (Gamble) – 23:58	7–2
Hickey (Hellyer, Sanderson) (PP) – 28:47	8–2
	8–3	29:57 – Keogh (Hall)
Leblanc (Sanderson, Hellyer) – 31:10	9–3
	9–4	39:03 – Keogh (D. Dawson, Walters)
	9–5	40:16 – Keogh (D. Dawson, Hall)
	9–6	44:19 – B. Self (Evans, Smith)
	9–7	46:06 – Keogh (D. Dawson)
Sanderson (B. Merrill, Chapman) (SH) – 47:43	10–7
Leblanc (Sanderson, Hellyer) – 55:01	11–7
	11–8	57:59 – Keogh (Vitarelli) (PP)

12 min
Penalties
14 min
43
Shots
51

Rock wins series 2–1.

==== (W1) Edmonton Rush vs. (W3) Calgary Roughnecks ====
May 15, 2015	Edmonton Rush	10–8 (3–0, 3–3, 1–3, 3–2)	Calgary Roughnecks	Rexall Place; Attendance: 5,808

Game reference

Aaron Bold
Goalies
Frankie Scigliano

Matthews (Davis, Greer) – 08:31	1–0
Greer (Matthews, Dinsdale) – 09:39	2–0
Corbeil – 11:16	3–0
Matthews (Davis, Bilic) – 17:18	4–0
	4–1	20:49 – Dickson
	4–2	21:04 – Evans (Dickson, Moleski)
Matthews (Dinsdale) (PP) – 23:30	5–2
Dinsdale (Matthews) (PP) – 28:33	6–2
	6–3	29:58 – Veltman (Evans, Dobbie)
Greer – 30:28	7–3
	7–4	31:58 – Manning (Carnegie)
	7–5	34:58 – Dobbie (Evans) (PP)
	7–6	41:22 – Dickson (Leung, Scigliano)
Loewen (Matthews, Dinsdale) (PP) – 51:19	8–6
	8–7	53:42 – Dickson (Pollock, Evans)
	8–8	56:48 – Dobbie (Evans, Pollock)
McIntosh (Matthews) – 57:50	9–8
Greer – 58:27	10–8

10 min
Penalties
20 min
45
Shots
37

May 23, 2015	Calgary Roughnecks	1–4	Edmonton Rush	Scotiabank Saddledome; Attendance: 12,785

Game reference

Frankie Scigliano
Goalies
Aaron Bold

Dobbie (Dickson, Evans) – 01:52	1–0
	1–1	04:12 – Matthews (Davis, Dinsdale)
	1–2	04:58 – Cornwall
	1–3	07:07 – McIntosh (Matthews, Dinsdale)
	1–4	09:21 – Matthews (Bold) (ENG)

2 min
Penalties
2 min
7
Shots
6

May 23, 2015	Calgary Roughnecks	12–9 (3–7, 6–0, 0–1, 3–1)	Edmonton Rush	Scotiabank Saddledome; Attendance: 12,785

Game reference

Frankie Scigliano
Mike Poulin
Goalies
Aaron Bold
Tyler Carlson

Dickson (Moleski) – 01:56	1–0
Shattler (Evans, Veltman) – 05:37	2–0
Dobbie (Evans, Dickson) (SH) – 07:26	3–0
	3–1	07:55 – Greer (PP, PS)
	3–2	09:09 – Church (Matthews, Greer) (PP)
	3–3	09:09 – Loewen (Church, Matthews) (PP)
	3–4	11:11 – Thompson
	3–5	11:30 – Loewen (Greer)
	3–6	13:51 – Greer (Dinsdale, Davis)
	3–7	Dilks (LaFontaine) – 14:39
Dickson (Dobbie) – 15:49	4–7
Evans (Veltman, Shattler) – 18:29	5–7
Dobbie (Evans, Veltman) – 26:05	6–7
Evans (Shattler, Dobbie) – 26:30	7–7
Dobbie (Veltman, Dickson) (PP) – 27:16	8–7
Snider – 26:24	9–7
	9–8	Church (Matthews) (PP) – 37:16
Evans (Snider, Harnett) – 53:14	10–8
	10–9	Church (Corbeil) – 54:35
Dickson (Evans, Shattler) – 56:26	11–9
Dickson (ENG) – 59:45	12–9

8 min
Penalties
4 min
51
Shots
47

Rush wins series 2–1.

=== NLL Finals (best of three) ===
==== (W1) Toronto Rock vs. (E1) Edmonton Rush ====
May 30, 2015	Toronto Rock	9–15 (2–5, 2–4, 4–3, 1–3)	Edmonton Rush	Air Canada Centre; Attendance: 9,257

Game reference

Brandon Miller
Nick Rose
Goalies
Aaron Bold

Beirnes (Leblanc) – 00:49	1–0
Sorensen – 03:18	2–0
	2–1	04:48 – Matthews (Church) (PP)
	2–2	09:48 – Matthews (Dinsdale, Mydske)
	2–3	10:34 – McIntosh (Church, Corbeil)
	2–4	11:30 – Church (Greer, Loewen)
	2–5	14:09 – Davis (Bold) (SH)
	2–6	17:34 – Loewen (Thompson)
Beirnes (Hellyer, Crowley) – 18:00	3–6
Hellyer (Doyle) (PP) – 20:48	4–6
	4–7	22:27 – McIntosh (Loewen)
	4–8	24:54 – Thompson (Dilks)
	4–9	28:42 – Sorichetti
Crowley (B. Merrill) – 31:42	5–9
	5–10	34:03 – Matthews (Church, McIntosh) (PP)
Sanderson (Hellyer, Leblanc) (PP) – 35:57	6–10
Doyle (Hickey, Crowley) – 37:54	7–10
	7–11	38:15 – Church (Dinsdale, Matthews)
Crowley (Sanderson) – 39:40	8–11
	8–12	44:15 – Greer (Matthews, McIntosh)
	8–13	48:07 – Thompson (McIntosh, Greer)
	8–14	48:54 – Greer (Davis, McIntosh)
	8–15	50:46 – Church (Dinsdale, Matthews)
Hickey (Hellyer, Leblanc) – 52:57	9–15

19 min
Penalties
13 min
48
Shots
54

June 5, 2015	Edmonton Rush	11–10 (1–2, 4–2, 3–4, 3–2)	Toronto Rock	Rexall Place; Attendance: 12,275

Game reference

Aaron Bold
Goalies
Brandon Miller

	0–1	04:06 – Sanderson (Hellyer, Doyle)
Cornwall – 07:18	1–1
	1–2	13:22 – Hellyer (Sanderson) (PP)
Greer (Loewen, Church) – 15:27	2–2
	2–3	17:15 – Crowley (Hellyer)
Church (McIntosh, Dinsdale) – 23:50	3–3
	3–4	24:37 – Beirnes (Sanderson, Leblanc)
Matthews (Rubisch) – 25:26	4–4
Matthews (McIntosh, Church) (PP) – 29:59	5–4
Matthews (Greer) (PP) – 31:54	6–4
	6–5	34:29 – Beirnes (Doyle, Hellyer) (PP)
McIntosh (Dinsdale, Matthews) – 36:17	7–5
	7–6	37:52 – Leblanc (Crowley)
	7–7	40:40 – Gilbert (PP)
	7–8	41:15 – Doyle (Hellyer)
Church (Matthews, Davis) – 43:13	8–8
	8–9	51:03 – Hellyer (Sanderson, Leblanc) (SH)
Matthews (McIntosh, Church) (PP) – 52:32	9–9
Matthews (Lintz) (SH) – 55:28	10–9
	10–10	57:42 – Doyle (Leblanc, Gilbert)
Dinsdale (McIntosh, Matthews) – 58:58	11–10

10 min
Penalties
17 min
52
Shots
42

Rush wins series 2–0.

== Awards ==
=== Annual awards ===
Award	Winner	Other Finalists
Most Valuable Player	Shawn Evans, Calgary	Mark Matthews, Edmonton; Ryan Benesch, Buffalo
Goaltender of the Year	Matt Vinc, Rochester	Aaron Bold, Edmonton; Brandon Miller, Toronto
Defensive Player of the Year	Kyle Rubisch, Edmonton	Chris Corbeil, Edmonton; Steve Priolo, Buffalo
Transition Player of the Year	Joey Cupido, Colorado	Brodie Merrill, Toronto; Karsen Leung, Calgary
Rookie of the Year	Ben McIntosh, Edmonton	Jeremy Noble, Colorado; Miles Thompson, Minnesota
Sportsmanship Award	Kyle Buchanan, New England	Jordan Hall, Rochester; Curtis Hodgson, Vancouver
GM of the Year	Terry Sanderson, Toronto	Steve Dietrich, Buffalo; Curt Styres, Rochester
Les Bartley Award	John Lovell, Toronto	Mike Hasen, Rochester; Derek Keenan, Edmonton
Executive of the Year Award	Bruce Urban, Edmonton	Scott Loffler, Buffalo; Lewis Staats, Rochester
Tom Borrelli Award	Steve Ewan, The Province	

=== Monthly awards ===
Awards are presented monthly for the best overall player and best rookie.

Month	Overall	Rookie
January	Josh Sanderson	Ben McIntosh
February	Rob Hellyer	Miles Thompson
March	Aaron Bold	Jeremy Noble
April	Ryan Benesch	Ben McIntosh

== Stadiums and locations ==
Buffalo Bandits	Minnesota Swarm	New England Black Wolves	Rochester Knighthawks	Toronto Rock
First Niagara Center	Xcel Energy Center	Mohegan Sun Arena	Blue Cross Arena	Air Canada Centre
Capacity: 19,070	Capacity: 17,954	Capacity: 7,700	Capacity: 11,200	Capacity: 18,819

Calgary Roughnecks	Colorado Mammoth	Edmonton Rush	Vancouver Stealth
Scotiabank Saddledome	Pepsi Center	Rexall Place	Langley Events Centre
Capacity: 19,289	Capacity: 18,007	Capacity: 16,839	Capacity: 5,276

== Attendance ==
=== Regular season ===
Home team	Home games	Average attendance	Total attendance
Colorado Mammoth	9	14,787	133,091
Buffalo Bandits	9	14,316	128,847
Calgary Roughnecks	9	11,642	104,785
Toronto Rock	9	10,011	90,102
Minnesota Swarm	9	8,699	78,291
Rochester Knighthawks	9	7,051	63,465
Edmonton Rush	9	6,578	59,207
New England Black Wolves	9	3,914	35,234
Vancouver Stealth	9	3,734	33,610
League	81	8,970	726,632

=== Playoffs ===
Home team	Home games	Average attendance	Total attendance
Colorado Mammoth	1	16,027	16,027
Calgary Roughnecks	2	12,785	25,570
Edmonton Rush	2	9,982	19,965
Toronto Rock	3	9,892	29,677
Rochester Knighthawks	2	6,167	12,335
League	10	10,357	103,574

== See also ==
- 2015 in sports
