= 2015 Calgary Roughnecks season =

2015 Calgary Roughnecks
- League: NLL
- Division: 3rd West
- 2015 record: 7 - 11
- Home record: 4 - 5
- Road record: 3 - 6
- Goals for: 212
- Goals against: 217
- General Manager: Mike Board
- Coach: Curt Malawsky
- Captain: Andrew McBride
- Alternate captains: Mike Carnegie
- Arena: Scotiabank Saddledome

Team leaders
- Goals: Curtis Dickson (48)
- Assists: Shawn Evans (83)
- Points: Shawn Evans (130)
- Penalties in minutes: Geoff Snider (42)
- Loose Balls: Geoff Snider (121)
- Wins: Frankie Scigliano (6)
- Goals against average: Frankie Scigliano (11.12)

The Calgary Roughnecks are a lacrosse team based in Calgary playing in the National Lacrosse League (NLL). The 2015 season is the 14th in franchise history.

== Regular season ==
=== Final standings ===
East Division
P	Team	GP	W	L	PCT	GB	Home	Road	GF	GA	Diff	GF/GP	GA/GP
1	Toronto Rock – xyz	18	14	4	.778	0.0	7–2	7–2	230	185	+45	12.78	10.28
2	Rochester Knighthawks – x	18	12	6	.667	2.0	7–2	5–4	205	173	+32	11.39	9.61
3	Buffalo Bandits – x	18	11	7	.611	3.0	7–2	4–5	236	208	+28	13.11	11.56
4	Minnesota Swarm	18	6	12	.333	8.0	3–6	3–6	185	226	−41	10.28	12.56
5	New England Black Wolves	18	4	14	.222	10.0	2–7	2–7	186	249	−63	10.33	13.83

West Division
P	Team	GP	W	L	PCT	GB	Home	Road	GF	GA	Diff	GF/GP	GA/GP
1	Edmonton Rush – xy	18	13	5	.722	0.0	6–3	7–2	241	177	+64	13.39	9.83
2	Colorado Mammoth – x	18	9	9	.500	4.0	6–3	3–6	212	218	−6	11.78	12.11
3	Calgary Roughnecks – x	18	7	11	.389	6.0	4–5	3–6	212	217	−5	11.78	12.06
4	Vancouver Stealth	18	5	13	.278	8.0	3–6	2–7	211	265	−54	11.72	14.72

x: Clinched playoff berth; c: Clinched playoff berth by crossing over to another division; y: Clinched division; z: Clinched best regular season record; GP: Games Played
W: Wins; L: Losses; GB: Games back; PCT: Win percentage; Home: Record at Home; Road: Record on the Road; GF: Goals scored; GA: Goals allowed
Differential: Difference between goals scored and allowed; GF/GP: Average number of goals scored per game; GA/GP: Average number of goals allowed per game

== Game log ==
=== Regular season ===
Game	Date	Opponent	Location	Score	OT	Attendance	Record
1	January 3, 2015	Vancouver Stealth	Scotiabank Saddledome	L 14–18		11,563	0–1
2	January 10, 2015	@ Colorado Mammoth	Pepsi Center	L 16–17	OT	15,107	0–2
3	January 24, 2015	Edmonton Rush	Scotiabank Saddledome	L 8–16		12,266	0–3
4	January 31, 2015	@ Toronto Rock	Air Canada Centre	L 11–12		11,716	0–4
5	February 7, 2015	Buffalo Bandits	Scotiabank Saddledome	L 14–15	OT	10,312	0–5
6	February 14, 2015	@ Vancouver Stealth	Langley Events Centre	L 9–13		3,715	0–6
7	February 21, 2015	Vancouver Stealth	Scotiabank Saddledome	W 16–13		11,645	1–6
8	February 28, 2015	@ Rochester Knighthawks	Blue Cross Arena	L 11–12		7,018	1–7
9	March 8, 2015	@ Edmonton Rush	Rexall Place	W 12–11	OT	6,202	2–7
10	March 14, 2015	Rochester Knighthawks	Scotiabank Saddledome	L 7–13		13,212	2–8
11	March 20, 2015	New England Black Wolves	Scotiabank Saddledome	W 20–9		9,478	3–8
12	March 28, 2015	Toronto Rock	Scotiabank Saddledome	L 10–12		12,330	3–9
13	April 3, 2015	@ Colorado Mammoth	Pepsi Center	L 8–9	OT	15,027	3–10
14	April 4, 2015	Colorado Mammoth	Scotiabank Saddledome	W 14–9		9,871	4–10
15	April 10, 2015	Edmonton Rush	Scotiabank Saddledome	W 9–8		14,108	5–10
16	April 11, 2015	@ Edmonton Rush	Rexall Place	L 9–11		7,289	5–11
17	April 18, 2015	@ Minnesota Swarm	Xcel Energy Center	W 10–6		8,131	6–11
18	May 2, 2015	@ Vancouver Stealth	Langley Event Centre	W 14–13		4,833	7–11

=== Playoffs ===
Game	Date	Opponent	Location	Score	OT	Attendance	Record
Western division semi-final	May 9, 2015	@ Colorado Mammoth	Pepsi Center	W 11–6		16,027	1–0
Western Final (Game 1)	May 15, 2015	@ Edmonton Rush	Rexall Place	L 6–10			1–1
Western Final (Game 2)	May 22, 2015	Edmonton Rush	Scotiabank Saddledome	W 12–9		12,785	2–1
Western Final (Tiebreaker)	May 22, 2015	Edmonton Rush	Scotiabank Saddledome	L 1–4		12,785	2–2

== Roster ==
2015 Calgary Roughnecks roster
Active (21-man) roster		Inactive roster	Coaches
Goaltenders: 30 (Canada) Mike Poulin; 92 (Canada) Frankie Scigliano; Defensemen: 16 (Canada) Mike Carnegie (A); 22 (Canada) Scott Carnegie; 11 (Canada) Greg Harnett; 3 (Canada) Dan MacRae; 37 (Canada) Andrew McBride (C); 6 (Canada) Garrett McIntosh; 14 (Canada) Jeff Moleski	Forwards: 17 (Canada) Curtis Dickson; 61 (Canada) Matthew Dinsdale; 44 (Canada) Dane Dobbie; 15 (Canada) Shawn Evans; 77 (Canada) Jeff Shattler; 36 (Canada) Daryl Veltman; Transition: 20 (Canada) Travis Cornwall; 21 (Canada) Karsen Leung; 10 (Canada) Curtis Manning; 80 (Canada) Peter McFetridge; 4 (Canada) Geoff Snider	Practice squad: 33 (Canada) Jon Harnett (D); 24 (Canada) Patrick O'Meara (D); 7 (Canada) Tor Reinholdt (T); 87 (Canada) Tyson Roe (T)	Head coach {{{Head Coach}}} Legend: * Suspended list; (C) Captain; (A) Alternate captain; Roster updated 2012-01-09; NLL Transactions

== Transactions ==
=== Trades ===
September 22, 2014	To New England Black Wolves 6th, 8th, 26th, 27th selections, 2014 entry draft	To Calgary Roughnecks 1st round selection, 2015 entry draft 3rd round selection, 2016 entry draft

=== Entry Draft ===
The 2014 NLL Entry Draft took place on September 22, 2014. The Roughnecks made the following selections:

Round	Overall	Player	College/Club
2	16	Tyson Roe	
4	36	Pat Henry	
5	45	Cam Gardner	
6	54	Andrew Smistad	

== See also ==
- 2015 NLL season
