= 2015 Toronto Rock season =

Lacrosse season

2015 Toronto Rock
- East Division Champions
- League: NLL
- Division: 1st East
- 2015 record: 14–4
- Home record: 7–2
- Road record: 7–2
- Goals for: 230
- Goals against: 185
- General Manager: Jamie Dawick
- Coach: John Lovell
- Captain: Colin Doyle (injured); Josh Sanderson
- Alternate captains: Sandy Chapman; Patrick Merrill
- Arena: Air Canada Centre

Team leaders
- Goals: Brett Hickey (50)
- Assists: Josh Sanderson (83)
- Points: Josh Sanderson (102)
- Penalties in minutes: Bill Hostrawser (90)
- Loose Balls: Brodie Merrill (151)
- Wins: Brandon Miller (8)
- Goals against average: Nick Rose (9.70)

The Toronto Rock are a lacrosse team based in Toronto playing in the National Lacrosse League (NLL). The 2015 season is the 18th in franchise history, and 17th as the Rock.

== Regular season ==
=== Current standings ===
East Division
P	Team	GP	W	L	PCT	GB	Home	Road	GF	GA	Diff	GF/GP	GA/GP
1	Toronto Rock – xyz	18	14	4	.778	0.0	7–2	7–2	230	185	+45	12.78	10.28
2	Rochester Knighthawks – x	18	12	6	.667	2.0	7–2	5–4	205	173	+32	11.39	9.61
3	Buffalo Bandits – x	18	11	7	.611	3.0	7–2	4–5	236	208	+28	13.11	11.56
4	Minnesota Swarm	18	6	12	.333	8.0	3–6	3–6	185	226	−41	10.28	12.56
5	New England Black Wolves	18	4	14	.222	10.0	2–7	2–7	186	249	−63	10.33	13.83

West Division
P	Team	GP	W	L	PCT	GB	Home	Road	GF	GA	Diff	GF/GP	GA/GP
1	Edmonton Rush – xy	18	13	5	.722	0.0	6–3	7–2	241	177	+64	13.39	9.83
2	Colorado Mammoth – x	18	9	9	.500	4.0	6–3	3–6	212	218	−6	11.78	12.11
3	Calgary Roughnecks – x	18	7	11	.389	6.0	4–5	3–6	212	217	−5	11.78	12.06
4	Vancouver Stealth	18	5	13	.278	8.0	3–6	2–7	211	265	−54	11.72	14.72

x: Clinched playoff berth; c: Clinched playoff berth by crossing over to another division; y: Clinched division; z: Clinched best regular season record; GP: Games Played
W: Wins; L: Losses; GB: Games back; PCT: Win percentage; Home: Record at Home; Road: Record on the Road; GF: Goals scored; GA: Goals allowed
Differential: Difference between goals scored and allowed; GF/GP: Average number of goals scored per game; GA/GP: Average number of goals allowed per game

== Game log ==
=== Regular season ===
Game	Date	Opponent	Location	Score	OT	Attendance	Record
1	January 3, 2015	@ Rochester Knighthawks	Blue Cross Arena	W 13–12		6,421	1–0
2	January 10, 2015	@ Vancouver Stealth	Langley Events Centre	W 20–11		4,724	2–0
3	January 23, 2015	Buffalo Bandits	Air Canada Centre	W 13–11		11,413	3–0
4	January 24, 2015	@ Rochester Knighthawks	Blue Cross Arena	L 6–8		6,745	3–1
5	January 31, 2015	Calgary Roughnecks	Air Canada Centre	W 12–11		11,716	4–1
6	February 13, 2015	@ Minnesota Swarm	Xcel Energy Center	W 16–4		8,945	5–1
7	February 14, 2015	Minnesota Swarm	Air Canada Centre	W 14–9		8,668	6–1
8	February 20, 2015	New England Black Wolves	Air Canada Centre	W 13–12	OT	7,743	7–1
9	February 27, 2015	@ Edmonton Rush	Rexall Centre	W 16–15	OT	6,239	8–1
10	March 6, 2015	@ Colorado Mammoth	Pepsi Center	W 17–9		14,116	9–1
11	March 13, 2015	@ Buffalo Bandits	First Niagara Center	L 12–15		12,903	9–2
12	March 14, 2015	Buffalo Bandits	Air Canada Centre	W 11–10	OT	11,460	10–2
13	March 21, 2015	Edmonton Rush	Air Canada Centre	L 9–11		10,296	10–3
14	March 28, 2015	@ Calgary Roughnecks	Scotiabank Saddledome	W 12–10		12,330	11–3
15	April 3, 2015	Rochester Knighthawks	Air Canada Centre	L 7–11		10,218	11–4
16	April 10, 2015	Vancouver Stealth	Air Canada Centre	W 14–7		9,317	12–4
17	April 17, 2015	New England Black Wolves	Air Canada Centre	W 15–12		9,271	13–4
18	May 1, 2015	@ New England Black Wolves	Mohegan Sun Arena	W 10–7		3,514	14–4

=== Playoffs ===
Game	Date	Opponent	Location	Score	OT	Attendance	Record
Division Finals Game 1	May 16, 2015	@ Rochester Knighthawks	Blue Cross Arena	L 9–10		5,808	0–1
Division Finals Game 2	May 23, 2015	Rochester Knighthawks	Air Canada Centre	W 11–8		10,210	1–1
Division Finals tiebreaker game*	May 23, 2015	Rochester Knighthawks	Air Canada Centre	W 8–2		–	2–1
Finals; Game 1	May 30, 2015	Edmonton Rush	Air Canada Centre	L 9–15		9,257	2–2
Finals; Game 2	June 5, 2015	@ Edmonton Rush	Rexall Place	L 10–11		12,275	2–3

* 10-minute series tiebreaker mini-game played immediately following game 2

== Roster ==
Toronto Rock roster
Active (21-man) roster		Inactive roster	Coaches
Goaltenders: 35 (Canada) Brandon Miller; 66 (Canada) Nick Rose; Defensemen: 5 (Canada) Sandy Chapman (A); 45 (Canada) Damon Edwards; 44 (Canada) Jeff Gilbert; 21 (Canada) Bill Greer; 91 (Canada) Bill Hostrawser; 14 (Canada) Rob Marshall; 9 (Canada) Patrick Merrill (A)	Forwards: 33 (Canada) Kasey Beirnes; 12 (Canada) Kevin Crowley; 7 (Canada) Colin Doyle; 10 (Canada) Rob Hellyer; 11 (Canada) Brett Hickey; 17 (Canada) Stephan Leblanc; 71 (Canada) Kevin Ross; 19 (Canada) Josh Sanderson (C); Transition: 4 (Canada) Jesse Gamble; 37 (Canada) Brodie Merrill; 3 (Canada) Brock Sorensen	Practice squad: 27 (Canada) Glen Bryan (D); 8 (Canada) Nick Diachenko (D); 39 (Canada) Steve Fryer (G); 77 (Canada) Mark White (T); Injured reserve: 92 (Canada) Brandon Benn; 88 (Canada) Scott Johnston; 16 (Canada) Jordan Robertson	Head coach {{{Head Coach}}} Legend: * Suspended list; (C) Captain; (A) Alternate captain; Roster updated 2015-2-25; NLL Transactions

== Transactions ==
=== Trades ===
August 20, 2014	To Toronto Rock Brock Sorensen	To Minnesota Swarm Ethan O'Connor; 1st round selection, 2017 entry draft
August 28, 2014	To Toronto Rock Brodie Merrill; 2nd round selection, 2015 entry draft	To New England Black Wolves Craig England; Mike Burke; 2nd round selection, 2014 entry draft 1st round selection, 2015 entry draft 2nd round selection, 2016 entry draft
March 31, 2015	To Toronto Rock Kevin Crowley	To New England Black Wolves Garrett Billings

=== Entry Draft ===
The 2014 NLL Entry Draft took place on September 22, 2014. The Rock made the following selections:

Round	Overall	Player	College/Club
4	33	Brandon Benn	
5	43	Jordan Robertson	
6	51	Brady Heseltine	
6	52	Darryl Robertson	

== See also ==
- 2015 NLL season
