= 2015 Vancouver Stealth season =

2015 Vancouver Stealth
- League: NLL
- Division: 4th West
- 2015 record: 5 - 13
- Home record: 3 - 8
- Road record: 2 - 7
- Goals for: 211
- Goals against: 265
- General Manager: Doug Locker
- Coach: Dan Perreault
- Captain: Curtis Hodgson
- Alternate captains: Rhys Duch; Cliff Smith
- Arena: Langley Event Centre

Team leaders
- Goals: Rhys Duch (41)
- Assists: Rhys Duch (62)
- Points: Rhys Duch (103)
- Penalties in minutes: Rory Smith (42)
- Loose Balls: Mitch McMichael (135)
- Wins: Tyler Richards (4)
- Goals against average: Tyler Richards (14.57)

The Vancouver Stealth are a lacrosse team based in Vancouver, British Columbia. The team plays in the National Lacrosse League (NLL). The 2015 season is the second season in Vancouver, though it will be the 16th in franchise history. They previously played in Everett, Washington, San Jose, and Albany, New York.

== Regular season ==
=== Current standings ===
East Division
P	Team	GP	W	L	PCT	GB	Home	Road	GF	GA	Diff	GF/GP	GA/GP
1	Toronto Rock – xyz	18	14	4	.778	0.0	7–2	7–2	230	185	+45	12.78	10.28
2	Rochester Knighthawks – x	18	12	6	.667	2.0	7–2	5–4	205	173	+32	11.39	9.61
3	Buffalo Bandits – x	18	11	7	.611	3.0	7–2	4–5	236	208	+28	13.11	11.56
4	Minnesota Swarm	18	6	12	.333	8.0	3–6	3–6	185	226	−41	10.28	12.56
5	New England Black Wolves	18	4	14	.222	10.0	2–7	2–7	186	249	−63	10.33	13.83

West Division
P	Team	GP	W	L	PCT	GB	Home	Road	GF	GA	Diff	GF/GP	GA/GP
1	Edmonton Rush – xy	18	13	5	.722	0.0	6–3	7–2	241	177	+64	13.39	9.83
2	Colorado Mammoth – x	18	9	9	.500	4.0	6–3	3–6	212	218	−6	11.78	12.11
3	Calgary Roughnecks – x	18	7	11	.389	6.0	4–5	3–6	212	217	−5	11.78	12.06
4	Vancouver Stealth	18	5	13	.278	8.0	3–6	2–7	211	265	−54	11.72	14.72

x: Clinched playoff berth; c: Clinched playoff berth by crossing over to another division; y: Clinched division; z: Clinched best regular season record; GP: Games Played
W: Wins; L: Losses; GB: Games back; PCT: Win percentage; Home: Record at Home; Road: Record on the Road; GF: Goals scored; GA: Goals allowed
Differential: Difference between goals scored and allowed; GF/GP: Average number of goals scored per game; GA/GP: Average number of goals allowed per game

=== Game log ===
Game	Date	Opponent	Location	Score	OT	Attendance	Record
1	January 3, 2015	@ Calgary Roughnecks	Scotiabank Saddledome	W 18–14		11,563	1–0
2	January 10, 2015	Toronto Rock	Langley Event Centre	L 11–20		4,724	1–1
3	January 17, 2015	Buffalo Bandits	Langley Event Centre	L 13–14		3,478	1–2
4	January 24, 2015	@ Colorado Mammoth	Pepsi Center	L 9–20		14,345	1–3
5	January 31, 2015	Colorado Mammoth	Langley Event Centre	W 16–13		3,516	2–3
6	February 14, 2015	Calgary Roughnecks	Langley Event Centre	W 13–9		3,715	3–3
7	February 21, 2015	@ Calgary Roughnecks	Scotiabank Saddledome	L 13–16		11,645	3–4
8	February 28, 2015	Minnesota Swarm	Langley Event Centre	W 21–15		3,259	4–4
9	March 14, 2015	@ Edmonton Rush	Rexall Place	L 7–19		5,808	4–5
10	March 21, 2015	Colorado Mammoth	Langley Event Centre	L 11–14		3,678	4–6
11	March 29, 2015	@ Colorado Mammoth	Pepsi Center	L 6–12		13,509	4–7
12	April 3, 2015	@ Edmonton Rush	Rexall Place	L 14–15	OT	6,448	4–8
13	April 4, 2015	Edmonton Rush	Langley Event Centre	L 10–17		3,365	4–9
14	April 10, 2015	@ Toronto Rock	Air Canada Centre	L 7–14		9,317	4–10
15	April 12, 2015	@ New England Black Wolves	Mohegan Sun	W 11–9		3,066	5–10
16	April 18, 2015	Rochester Knighthawks	Langley Event Centre	L 9–13		3,042	5–11
17	April 25, 2015	@ Buffalo Bandits	First Niagara Center	L 9–17		15,897	5–12
18	May 2, 2015	Calgary Roughnecks	Langley Event Centre	L 13–14		4,833	5–13

== Roster ==
Vancouver Stealth roster
Active (21-man) roster		Inactive roster	Coaches
Goaltenders: 00 (Canada) Tyler Richards; 61 (Canada) Eric Penney; Defensemen: 74 (Canada) Colin Boucher; 6 (Canada) Curtis Hodgson (C); 9 (Canada) Bradley Kri; 4 (United States) Chris O'Dougherty; 24 (Canada) Rory Smith	Forwards: 7 (Canada) Tyler Digby; 10 (Canada) Rhys Duch (A); 55 (Canada) Joel McCready; 93 (Iroquois) Johnny Powless; 15 (Canada) Corey Small; 5 (Canada) Cliff Smith (A); Transition: 23 (Canada) Conrad Chapman; 63 (Canada) Brandon Clelland; 87 (Canada) Kyle Belton; 15 (Canada) Ilija Gajic; 8 (Canada) Tyler Hass; 32 (Canada) Mitch McMichael; 19 (Canada) Justin Salt	Practice Squad: 14 (Canada) Matt Delmonico (F); 50 (Canada) Cody Hagedorn (G); Injured Reserve: 77 (Canada) Tyler Burton (D); 91 (Canada) Tyler Garrison (T); Holdout: 2 (Canada) Matt Beers (D); 21 (United States) Tim Henderson (D); 34 (Canada) Neil Tyacke (G); Unable to play: 11 (Canada) Kyle Sorenson (D)	Head Coach {{{Head Coach}}} Legend: * Suspended list; (C) Captain; (A) Alternate captain; Roster updated 2015-03-12; NLL Transactions

== Transactions ==
=== Trades ===
August 13, 2014	To Vancouver Stealth Tyler Hass; Dane Stevens	To Minnesota Swarm Mike Grimes; 3rd round selection, 2016 entry draft
September 22, 2014	To Vancouver Stealth Rory Smith; Eric Penney; 12th selection, 2014 entry draft	To Buffalo Bandits Nick Weiss; 9th selection, 2014 entry draft 2nd round selection, 2015 entry draft 1st round selection, 2018 entry draft
September 22, 2014	To Vancouver Stealth Johnny Powless; Joel McCready; 9th & 23rd selections, 2014 entry draft	To Rochester Knighthawks 2nd & 11th selections, 2014 entry draft 1st round selection, 2015 entry draft 1st round selection, 2017 entry draft
January 19, 2015	To Vancouver Stealth Corey Small	To Edmonton Rush 1st round selection, 2016 entry draft 1st round selection, 2019 entry draft

=== Entry Draft ===
The 2014 NLL Entry Draft took place on September 22, 2014. The Stealth made the following selections:

Round	Overall	Player	College/Club
2	12	Conrad Chapman	
3	21	Brandon Clelland	
3	23	Dan Keane	
3	25	Jakob Doucet	
4	30	Matt Delmonico	
5	39	DJ Saari	
6	48	Steve Ferdinandi	

== See also ==
- 2015 NLL season
