= 2015 Edmonton Rush season =

2015 Edmonton Rush
- Champion's Cup Champions
- West Division Champions
- League: NLL
- Division: 1st West
- 2015 record: 13 - 5
- Home record: 6 - 3
- Road record: 7 - 2
- Goals for: 241
- Goals against: 177
- General Manager: Derek Keenan
- Coach: Derek Keenan
- Captain: Chris Corbeil
- Alternate captains: Jarrett Davis; Zack Greer; Brett Mydske; Kyle Rubisch
- Arena: Rexall Place
- Average attendance: 6,579

Team leaders
- Goals: Mark Matthews (53)
- Assists: Mark Matthews (62)
- Points: Mark Matthews (115)
- Penalties in minutes: Jeremy Thompson (41)
- Loose Balls: Jeremy Thompson (181)
- Wins: Aaron Bold (12)
- Goals against average: Aaron Bold (9.44)

The Edmonton Rush are a lacrosse team based in Edmonton playing in the National Lacrosse League (NLL). The 2015 season is the 10th in franchise history. After an 0-2 start to the season, the Rush picked up where they left off in 2014, winning 13 of their last 16 games to win the West division. They then defeated the Calgary Roughnecks in the division finals, winning game 1 of the 2-game series followed by the tie-breaker. The Rush then beat the Toronto Rock two games to none in the finals, winning their first-ever NLL Championship.

Edmonton received their 2nd number one overall pick, Ben McIntosh, in the past three NLL drafts, Mark Matthews was the other. 2015 was the final season in Edmonton for the Rush, as they moved to Saskatchewan after the season ended.

== Regular season ==
=== Finalstandings ===
East Division
P	Team	GP	W	L	PCT	GB	Home	Road	GF	GA	Diff	GF/GP	GA/GP
1	Toronto Rock – xyz	18	14	4	.778	0.0	7–2	7–2	230	185	+45	12.78	10.28
2	Rochester Knighthawks – x	18	12	6	.667	2.0	7–2	5–4	205	173	+32	11.39	9.61
3	Buffalo Bandits – x	18	11	7	.611	3.0	7–2	4–5	236	208	+28	13.11	11.56
4	Minnesota Swarm	18	6	12	.333	8.0	3–6	3–6	185	226	−41	10.28	12.56
5	New England Black Wolves	18	4	14	.222	10.0	2–7	2–7	186	249	−63	10.33	13.83

West Division
P	Team	GP	W	L	PCT	GB	Home	Road	GF	GA	Diff	GF/GP	GA/GP
1	Edmonton Rush – xy	18	13	5	.722	0.0	6–3	7–2	241	177	+64	13.39	9.83
2	Colorado Mammoth – x	18	9	9	.500	4.0	6–3	3–6	212	218	−6	11.78	12.11
3	Calgary Roughnecks – x	18	7	11	.389	6.0	4–5	3–6	212	217	−5	11.78	12.06
4	Vancouver Stealth	18	5	13	.278	8.0	3–6	2–7	211	265	−54	11.72	14.72

x: Clinched playoff berth; c: Clinched playoff berth by crossing over to another division; y: Clinched division; z: Clinched best regular season record; GP: Games Played
W: Wins; L: Losses; GB: Games back; PCT: Win percentage; Home: Record at Home; Road: Record on the Road; GF: Goals scored; GA: Goals allowed
Differential: Difference between goals scored and allowed; GF/GP: Average number of goals scored per game; GA/GP: Average number of goals allowed per game

== Game log ==
=== Regular season ===
Game	Date	Opponent	Location	Score	OT	Attendance	Record
1	January 3, 2015	@ Buffalo Bandits	First Niagara Center	L 8–9		14,236	0–1
2	January 10, 2015	Minnesota Swarm	Rexall Place	L 10–14		7,415	0–2
3	January 24, 2015	@ Calgary Roughnecks	Scotiabank Saddledome	W 16–8		12,266	1–2
4	January 30, 2015	New England Black Wolves	Rexall Place	W 18–9		5,257	2–2
5	February 13, 2015	@ Colorado Mammoth	Pepsi Center	W 11–7		16,082	3–2
6	February 15, 2015	Colorado Mammoth	Rexall Place	W 13–7		6,904	4–2
7	February 27, 2015	Toronto Rock	Rexall Place	L 15–16	OT	6,239	4–3
8	March 8, 2015	Calgary Roughnecks	Rexall Place	L 11–12	OT	6,202	4–4
9	March 14, 2015	Vancouver Stealth	Rexall Place	W 19–7		5,808	5–4
10	March 21, 2015	@ Toronto Rock	Air Canada Centre	W 11–9		10,296	6–4
11	March 28, 2015	@ Rochester Knighthawks	Blue Cross Arena	W 16–3		6,801	7–4
12	April 3, 2015	Vancouver Stealth	Rexall Place	W 15–14	OT	6,448	8–4
13	April 4, 2015	@ Vancouver Stealth	Langley Event Centre	W 17–10		3,365	9–4
14	April 10, 2015	@ Calgary Roughnecks	Scotiabank Saddledome	L 8–9		14,108	9–5
15	April 11, 2015	Calgary Roughnecks	Rexall Place	W 11–9		7,289	10–5
16	April 18, 2015	Colorado Mammoth	Rexall Place	W 13–12		7,645	11–5
17	April 25, 2015	@ Minnesota Swarm	Xcel Energy Center	W 16–12		8,013	12–5
18	May 2, 2015	@ Colorado Mammoth	Pepsi Center	W 13–10		16,239	13–5

=== Playoffs ===
Game	Date	Opponent	Location	Score	OT	Attendance	Record
Western Final (Game 1)	May 15, 2015	Calgary Roughnecks	Rexall Place	W 10–6		7,690	1–0
Western Final (Game 2)	May 22, 2015	@ Calgary Roughnecks	Scotiabank Saddledome	L 9–12		12,785	1–1
Western Final (Tiebreaker)	May 22, 2015	@ Calgary Roughnecks	Scotiabank Saddledome	W 4–1		12,785	2–1
Finals (Game 1)	May 30, 2015	@ Toronto Rock	Air Canada Centre	W 15–9		9,257	3–1
Finals (Game 2)	June 5, 2015	Toronto Rock	Rexall Place	W 11–10		12,275	4–1

== Transactions ==
=== Trades ===
July 1, 2014	To Edmonton Rush Tyler Carlson; 1st round pick in 2014 NLL Entry Draft - Ben McIntosh; 2nd round pick in 2015 NLL Entry Draft	To Minnesota Swarm Brodie MacDonald; 1st round pick in 2014 NLL Entry Draft - Miles Thompson
July 29, 2014	To Edmonton Rush 3rd round pick in 2015 NLL Entry Draft	To Minnesota Swarm Alex Turner
September 22, 2014	To Edmonton Rush 2nd round pick in 2014 NLL Entry Draft - Adam Shute; 2nd round pick in 2015 NLL Entry Draft	To Colorado Mammoth 1st round pick in 2014 NLL Entry Draft - Robert Hope
January 19, 2015	To Edmonton Rush 1st round pick in 2016 NLL Entry Draft; 1st round pick in 2019 NLL Entry Draft	To Vancouver Stealth Corey Small
March 31, 2015	To Edmonton Rush Matthew Dinsdale	To Calgary Roughnecks 3rd round pick in 2015 NLL Entry Draft

=== Entry Draft ===
The 2014 NLL Entry Draft took place on September 22, 2014. The Rush made the following selections:

Round	Overall	Player	College/Club
1	1	Ben McIntosh	Drexel University
2	13	Adam Shute	New England College
2	19	Tyler Melnyk	Marquette University
4	35	Matt MacGrotty	Bryant University
5	44	Chad Mitchell	Bellarmine University
6	47	Mitch McAvoy	Mercyhurst University
6	53	Michael Degirolamo	Sherwood Park, AB

== Roster ==
Edmonton Rush roster
Active (21-man) roster		Inactive roster	Coaches
Goaltenders: 77 (Canada) Aaron Bold; 30 (Canada) Tyler Carlson; Defensemen: 79 (Canada) Nik Bilic; 24 (Canada) Ryan Dilks; 6 (Canada) John Lintz; 4 (Canada) Kyle Rubisch (A)	Forwards: 17 (Canada) Robert Church; 61 (Canada) Matthew Dinsdale; 88 (Canada) Zack Greer (A); 10 (Canada) Riley Loewen; 42 (Canada) Mark Matthews; 90 (Canada) Ben McIntosh; 27 (Canada) Tyler Melnyk; Transition: 16 (Canada) Chris Corbeil (C); 13 (Canada) Jeff Cornwall; 23 (Canada) Jarrett Davis (A); 33 (Canada) John LaFontaine; 2 (Canada) Brett Mydske (A); 72 (Canada) Adrian Sorichetti; 74 (Haudenosaunee) Jeremy Thompson	Practice squad: 20 (Canada) Mitch Banister (D); 47 (Canada) Matt MacGrotty (D); 35 (Canada) Adam Shute (G); Unable to play: 9 (Canada) Curtis Knight (F); 3 (Canada) Jarrett Toll (D)	Head coach {{{Head Coach}}} Legend: * Suspended list; (C) Captain; (A) Alternate captain; Roster updated 2014-12-18; NLL Transactions

== See also ==
- 2015 NLL season
