= 2015 Rochester Knighthawks season =

2015 Rochester Knighthawks
- League: NLL
- Division: 2nd East
- 2015 record: 12 - 6
- Home record: 7 - 2
- Road record: 5 - 4
- Goals for: 205
- Goals against: 173
- General Manager: Curt Styres
- Coach: Mike Hasen
- Captain: Sid Smith
- Arena: Blue Cross Arena

Team leaders
- Goals: Cody Jamieson (36)
- Assists: Dan Dawson (62)
- Points: Cody Jamieson (92)
- Penalties in minutes: Paul Dawson (73)
- Loose Balls: Brad Self (133)
- Wins: Matt Vinc (10)
- Goals against average: Angus Goodleaf (7.85)

The Rochester Knighthawks were a lacrosse team based in Rochester, New York, that played in the National Lacrosse League (NLL). The 2015 season was the 21st in franchise history.

== Regular season ==
=== Current standings ===
East Division
P	Team	GP	W	L	PCT	GB	Home	Road	GF	GA	Diff	GF/GP	GA/GP
1	Toronto Rock – xyz	18	14	4	.778	0.0	7–2	7–2	230	185	+45	12.78	10.28
2	Rochester Knighthawks – x	18	12	6	.667	2.0	7–2	5–4	205	173	+32	11.39	9.61
3	Buffalo Bandits – x	18	11	7	.611	3.0	7–2	4–5	236	208	+28	13.11	11.56
4	Minnesota Swarm	18	6	12	.333	8.0	3–6	3–6	185	226	−41	10.28	12.56
5	New England Black Wolves	18	4	14	.222	10.0	2–7	2–7	186	249	−63	10.33	13.83

West Division
P	Team	GP	W	L	PCT	GB	Home	Road	GF	GA	Diff	GF/GP	GA/GP
1	Edmonton Rush – xy	18	13	5	.722	0.0	6–3	7–2	241	177	+64	13.39	9.83
2	Colorado Mammoth – x	18	9	9	.500	4.0	6–3	3–6	212	218	−6	11.78	12.11
3	Calgary Roughnecks – x	18	7	11	.389	6.0	4–5	3–6	212	217	−5	11.78	12.06
4	Vancouver Stealth	18	5	13	.278	8.0	3–6	2–7	211	265	−54	11.72	14.72

x: Clinched playoff berth; c: Clinched playoff berth by crossing over to another division; y: Clinched division; z: Clinched best regular season record; GP: Games Played
W: Wins; L: Losses; GB: Games back; PCT: Win percentage; Home: Record at Home; Road: Record on the Road; GF: Goals scored; GA: Goals allowed
Differential: Difference between goals scored and allowed; GF/GP: Average number of goals scored per game; GA/GP: Average number of goals allowed per game

== Game log ==
Game	Date	Opponent	Location	Score	OT	Attendance	Record
1	January 3, 2015	Toronto Rock	Blue Cross Arena	L 12–13		6,421	0–1
2	January 10, 2015	@ New England Black Wolves	Mohegan Sun	L 7–17		4,004	0–2
3	January 24, 2015	Toronto Rock	Blue Cross Arena	W 8–6		6,745	1–2
4	January 31, 2015	Buffalo Bandits	Blue Cross Arena	W 17–11		6,994	2–2
5	February 6, 2015	@ Minnesota Swarm	Xcel Energy Center	L 6–7	OT	9,645	2–3
6	February 14, 2015	@ Buffalo Bandits	First Niagara Center	W 15–10		14,737	3–3
7	February 15, 2015	@ New England Black Wolves	Mohegan Sun	W 15–10		3,558	4–3
8	February 21, 2015	Buffalo Bandits	Blue Cross Arena	W 13–12	OT	6,669	5–3
9	February 28, 2015	Calgary Roughnecks	Blue Cross Arena	W 12–11		7,018	6–3
10	March 14, 2015	@ Calgary Roughnecks	Scotiabank Saddledome	W 13–7		13,212	7–3
11	March 28, 2015	Edmonton Rush	Blue Cross Arena	L 3–16		6,801	7–4
12	April 3, 2015	@ Toronto Rock	Air Canada Centre	W 11–7		10,218	8–4
13	April 4, 2015	Minnesota Swarm	Blue Cross Arena	W 10–2		6,294	9–4
14	April 11, 2015	Colorado Mammoth	Blue Cross Arena	W 14–5		7,988	10–4
15	April 17, 2015	@ Colorado Mammoth	Pepsi Center	L 10–11		15,621	10–5
16	April 18, 2015	@ Vancouver Stealth	Langley Events Centre	W 13–9		3,042	11–5
17	April 25, 2015	New England Black Wolves	Blue Cross Arena	W 14–6		8,535	12–5
18	May 2, 2015	@ Minnesota Swarm	Xcel Energy Center	L 12–13	OT	9,086	12–6

== Roster ==
Rochester Knighthawks roster
Active (21-man) roster		Inactive roster	Coaches
Goaltenders: 55 (Iroquois) Angus Goodleaf; 48 (Canada) Matt Vinc; Defensemen: 74 (Canada) Colin Boucher; 37 (Canada) Scott Campbell; 2 (Canada) Paul Dawson; 16 (Canada) Dylan Evans; 26 (Canada) Mike Kirk (A); 29 (Canada) Ian Llord; 40 (Canada) Justin Pychel; 19 (Canada) Zac Reid; 5 (Canada) Scott Self; 79 (Iroquois) Sid Smith (C); 32 (Canada) Jon Sullivan	Forwards: 6 (Canada) Dan Dawson; 20 (Canada) Derek Hopcroft; 88 (Iroquois) Cody Jamieson (A); 28 (Iroquois) Stephen Keogh; 9 (Iroquois) Craig Point; 15 (United States) Joe Resetarits; 23 (Canada) Cory Vitarelli; 1 (United States) Joe Walters; Transition: 44 (Canada) Jordan Hall; 17 (Iroquois) Brier Jonathan; 91 (Canada) Joel Matthews; 25 (Canada) Brad Self	Practice squad: 66 (Iroquois) Zach Williams (T)	Head coach {{{Head Coach}}} Legend: * Suspended list; (C) Captain; (A) Alternate captain; updated 2015-04-20; NLL Transactions

== Transactions ==
=== Trades ===
September 22, 2014	To Rochester Knighthawks 2nd & 11th selections, 2014 entry draft 1st round selection, 2015 entry draft 1st round selection, 2017 entry draft	To Vancouver Stealth Johnny Powless; Joel McCready; 9th & 23rd selections, 2014 entry draft
September 22, 2014	To Rochester Knighthawks 27th selection, 2014 entry draft	To New England Black Wolves 3rd round selection, 2015 entry draft
September 22, 2014	To Rochester Knighthawks Jordan Hall	To New England Black Wolves 11th & 28th selection, 2014 entry draft 1st round selection, 2015 entry draft

=== Entry Draft ===
The 2014 NLL Entry Draft took place on September 22, 2014. The Knighthawks made the following selections:

Round	Overall	Player	College/Club
1	2	Jeremy Noble	
3	27	Brier Jonathan	
4	37	Ian Martin	
5	46	Anthony Patterson	
6	55	Zach Williams	

== See also ==
- 2015 NLL season
