= 2015 New England Black Wolves season =

2015 New England Black Wolves
- League: NLL
- Division: 5th East
- 2015 record: 4 - 14
- Home record: 2 - 7
- Road record: 2 - 7
- Goals for: 186
- Goals against: 249
- General Manager: Chris Seinko
- Coach: Blane Harrison
- Captain: Joel White
- Alternate captains: Kevin Crowley
- Arena: Mohegan Sun

Team leaders
- Goals: Pat Saunders (38)
- Assists: Kyle Buchanan (37)
- Points: Pat Saunders (68)
- Penalties in minutes: William O'Brien (68)
- Loose Balls: Ryan Hotaling (115)
- Wins: Evan Kirk (4)
- Goals against average: Evan Kirk (13.60)

The New England Black Wolves are a professional lacrosse team based in Uncasville, Connecticut, competing in the National Lacrosse League (NLL). The 2015 season marked the team's debut in New England team after relocating from Philadelphia Wings for 28 years.

== Regular season ==
=== Current standings ===
East Division
P	Team	GP	W	L	PCT	GB	Home	Road	GF	GA	Diff	GF/GP	GA/GP
1	Toronto Rock – xyz	18	14	4	.778	0.0	7–2	7–2	230	185	+45	12.78	10.28
2	Rochester Knighthawks – x	18	12	6	.667	2.0	7–2	5–4	205	173	+32	11.39	9.61
3	Buffalo Bandits – x	18	11	7	.611	3.0	7–2	4–5	236	208	+28	13.11	11.56
4	Minnesota Swarm	18	6	12	.333	8.0	3–6	3–6	185	226	−41	10.28	12.56
5	New England Black Wolves	18	4	14	.222	10.0	2–7	2–7	186	249	−63	10.33	13.83

West Division
P	Team	GP	W	L	PCT	GB	Home	Road	GF	GA	Diff	GF/GP	GA/GP
1	Edmonton Rush – xy	18	13	5	.722	0.0	6–3	7–2	241	177	+64	13.39	9.83
2	Colorado Mammoth – x	18	9	9	.500	4.0	6–3	3–6	212	218	−6	11.78	12.11
3	Calgary Roughnecks – x	18	7	11	.389	6.0	4–5	3–6	212	217	−5	11.78	12.06
4	Vancouver Stealth	18	5	13	.278	8.0	3–6	2–7	211	265	−54	11.72	14.72

x: Clinched playoff berth; c: Clinched playoff berth by crossing over to another division; y: Clinched division; z: Clinched best regular season record; GP: Games Played
W: Wins; L: Losses; GB: Games back; PCT: Win percentage; Home: Record at Home; Road: Record on the Road; GF: Goals scored; GA: Goals allowed
Differential: Difference between goals scored and allowed; GF/GP: Average number of goals scored per game; GA/GP: Average number of goals allowed per game

== Game log ==
Game	Date	Opponent	Location	Score	OT	Attendance	Record
1	January 2, 2015	Buffalo Bandits	Mohegan Sun	W 12–8		5,768	1–0
2	January 10, 2015	Rochester Knighthawks	Mohegan Sun	W 17–7		4,004	2–0
3	January 24, 2015	Minnesota Swarm	Mohegan Sun	L 13–19		3,563	2–1
4	January 30, 2015	@ Edmonton Rush	Rexall Place	L 9–18		5,257	2–2
5	February 15, 2015	Rochester Knighthawks	Mohegan Sun	L 10–15		3,558	2–3
6	February 20, 2015	@ Toronto Rock	Air Canada Centre	L 12–13	OT	7,743	2–4
7	February 22, 2015	Colorado Mammoth	Mohegan Sun	L 12–14		3,711	2–5
8	March 14, 2015	@ Minnesota Swarm	Xcel Energy Center	W 10–9		8,912	3–5
9	March 20, 2015	@ Calgary Roughnecks	Scotiabank Saddledome	L 9–20		9,478	3–6
10	March 28, 2015	Minnesota Swarm	Mohegan Sun	L 9–13		5,014	3–7
11	April 3, 2015	@ Minnesota Swarm	Xcel Energy Center	L 8–12		7,599	3–8
12	April 4, 2015	@ Buffalo Bandits	First Niagara Center	W 12–11		13,674	4–8
13	April 12, 2015	Vancouver Stealth	Mohegan Sun	L 9–11		3,066	4–9
14	April 17, 2015	@ Toronto Rock	Air Canada Centre	L 12–15		9,271	4–10
15	April 25, 2015	@ Rochester Knighthawks	Blue Cross Arena	L 6–14		8,535	4–11
16	April 26, 2015	Buffalo Bandits	Mohegan Sun	L 9–20		3,036	4–12
17	May 1, 2015	Toronto Rock	Mohegan Sun	L 7–10		3,514	4–13
18	May 2, 2015	@ Buffalo Bandits	First Niagara Center	L 10–20		15,374	4–14

== Roster ==
New England Black Wolves roster
Active (21-man) roster		Inactive roster	Coaches
Goaltenders: 31 (Canada) Tye Belanger; 35 (Canada) Evan Kirk; Defensemen: 71 (Canada) Sheldon Burns; 6 (United States) Michael Diehl; 88 (Canada) Craig England; 5 (United States) Michael Manley; 13 (United States) Brett Manney; 58 (Canada) Mike McNamara; 84 (United States) Brian Megill; 96 (United States) Bill O'Brien	Forwards: 27 (United States) Kevin Buchanan; 91 (Canada) Kyle Buchanan; 26 (Haudenosaunee) Brett Bucktooth; 41 (Canada) Mark Cockerton; 21 (Canada) Kevin Crowley (A); 42 (Canada) Jamie Lincoln; 77 (Haudenosaunee) Quinn Powless; 14 (Canada) Pat Saunders; Transition: 18 (Canada) Jesse Fehr; 20 (United States) Ryan Hotaling; 11 (United States) Joel White (C)	Practice squad: -- (Canada) Brent Adams (D); -- (United States) Matt Crough (F); -- (United States) Josh Johnson (F)	Head coach {{{Head Coach}}} Legend: * Suspended list; (C) Captain; (A) Alternate captain; Roster updated 2014-09-27; NLL Transactions

== Transactions ==
=== Trades ===
August 28, 2014	To New England Black Wolves Craig England; Mike Burke; 2nd round selection, 2014 entry draft 1st round selection, 2015 entry draft 2nd round selection, 2016 entry draft	To Toronto Rock Brodie Merrill; 2nd round selection, 2015 entry draft
September 22, 2014	To New England Black Wolves 3rd round selection, 2015 entry draft	To Rochester Knighthawks 27th overall selection, 2014 entry draft
September 22, 2014	To New England Black Wolves 6th, 8th, 26th, 27th selections, 2014 entry draft	To Calgary Roughnecks 1st round selection, 2015 entry draft 3rd round selection, 2016 entry draft
September 22, 2014	To New England Black Wolves 11th, 28th selections, 2014 entry draft 1st round selection, 2015 entry draft	To Rochester Knighthawks Jordan Hall
September 22, 2014	To New England Black Wolves Jay Card	To Minnesota Swarm 40th selection, 2014 entry draft
September 22, 2014	To New England Black Wolves Mike McNamara	To Colorado Mammoth 17th selection, 2014 entry draft
September 22, 2014	To New England Black Wolves 6th round selection, 2016 entry draft	To Buffalo Bandits 49th selection, 2014 entry draft
December 16, 2014	To New England Black Wolves Tye Belanger	To Colorado Mammoth 4th round selection, 2015 entry draft

=== Entry Draft ===
The 2014 NLL Entry Draft took place on September 22, 2014. The Black Wolves made the following selections:

Round	Overall	Player	College/Club
1	6	Mark Cockerton	
1	8	Quinn Powless	
2	11	Rodd Squire	
2	15	Matt Crough	
3	20	Josh Johnson	
3	22	Sheldon Burns	
3	26	Ty Thompson	
3	28	Connor Campbell	
4	31	Mike Mawdsley	
4	34	Jayson Crawford	

== See also ==
- 2015 NLL season
