= 2015 Colorado Mammoth season =

2015 Colorado Mammoth
- League: NLL
- Division: 2nd West
- 2015 record: 9 - 9
- Home record: 6 - 3
- Road record: 3 - 6
- Goals for: 212
- Goals against: 218
- General Manager: Steve Govett
- Coach: Dan Stroup, Pat Coyle, Chris Gill
- Captain: John Grant, Jr.
- Arena: Pepsi Center

Team leaders
- Goals: Adam Jones (51)
- Assists: John Grant, Jr. (57)
- Points: Adam Jones (93)
- Penalties in minutes: Dan Ball (25)
- Loose Balls: Bob Snider (119)
- Wins: Dillon Ward (7)
- Goals against average: Alex Buque (9.36)

The Colorado Mammoth are a lacrosse team based in Denver, Colorado playing in the National Lacrosse League (NLL). The 2015 season is the 29th in franchise history and 13th as the Mammoth (previously the Washington Power, Pittsburgh Crossefire, and Baltimore Thunder).

== Regular season ==
=== Final standings ===
East Division
| P | Team | GP | W | L | PCT | GB | Home | Road | GF | GA | Diff | GF/GP | GA/GP |
|---|---|---|---|---|---|---|---|---|---|---|---|---|---|
| 1 | Toronto Rock – xyz | 18 | 14 | 4 | .778 | 0.0 | 7–2 | 7–2 | 230 | 185 | +45 | 12.78 | 10.28 |
| 2 | Rochester Knighthawks – x | 18 | 12 | 6 | .667 | 2.0 | 7–2 | 5–4 | 205 | 173 | +32 | 11.39 | 9.61 |
| 3 | Buffalo Bandits – x | 18 | 11 | 7 | .611 | 3.0 | 7–2 | 4–5 | 236 | 208 | +28 | 13.11 | 11.56 |
| 4 | Minnesota Swarm | 18 | 6 | 12 | .333 | 8.0 | 3–6 | 3–6 | 185 | 226 | −41 | 10.28 | 12.56 |
| 5 | New England Black Wolves | 18 | 4 | 14 | .222 | 10.0 | 2–7 | 2–7 | 186 | 249 | −63 | 10.33 | 13.83 |

West Division
| P | Team | GP | W | L | PCT | GB | Home | Road | GF | GA | Diff | GF/GP | GA/GP |
|---|---|---|---|---|---|---|---|---|---|---|---|---|---|
| 1 | Edmonton Rush – xy | 18 | 13 | 5 | .722 | 0.0 | 6–3 | 7–2 | 241 | 177 | +64 | 13.39 | 9.83 |
| 2 | Colorado Mammoth – x | 18 | 9 | 9 | .500 | 4.0 | 6–3 | 3–6 | 212 | 218 | −6 | 11.78 | 12.11 |
| 3 | Calgary Roughnecks – x | 18 | 7 | 11 | .389 | 6.0 | 4–5 | 3–6 | 212 | 217 | −5 | 11.78 | 12.06 |
| 4 | Vancouver Stealth | 18 | 5 | 13 | .278 | 8.0 | 3–6 | 2–7 | 211 | 265 | −54 | 11.72 | 14.72 |

x: Clinched playoff berth; c: Clinched playoff berth by crossing over to another division; y: Clinched division; z: Clinched best regular season record; GP: Games Played
W: Wins; L: Losses; GB: Games back; PCT: Win percentage; Home: Record at Home; Road: Record on the Road; GF: Goals scored; GA: Goals allowed
Differential: Difference between goals scored and allowed; GF/GP: Average number of goals scored per game; GA/GP: Average number of goals allowed per game

== Game log ==
=== Regular season ===
| Game | Date | Opponent | Location | Score | OT | Attendance | Record |
|---|---|---|---|---|---|---|---|
| 1 | January 3, 2015 | @ Minnesota Swarm | Xcel Energy Center | W 20–13 | | 8,974 | 1–0 |
| 2 | January 10, 2015 | Calgary Roughnecks | Pepsi Center | W 17–16 | OT | 15,107 | 2–0 |
| 3 | January 24, 2015 | Vancouver Stealth | Pepsi Center | W 20–9 | | 14,345 | 3–0 |
| 4 | January 31, 2015 | @ Vancouver Stealth | Langley Events Centre | L 13–16 | | 3,516 | 3–1 |
| 5 | February 13, 2015 | Edmonton Rush | Pepsi Center | L 7–11 | | 16,082 | 3–2 |
| 6 | February 15, 2015 | @ Edmonton Rush | Rexall Place | L 7–13 | | 6,904 | 3–3 |
| 7 | February 22, 2015 | @ New England Black Wolves | Mohegan Sun | W 14–12 | | 3,711 | 4–3 |
| 8 | February 28, 2015 | @ Buffalo Bandits | First Niagara Center | L 11–14 | | 14,669 | 4–4 |
| 9 | March 6, 2015 | Toronto Rock | Pepsi Center | L 9–17 | | 14,116 | 4–5 |
| 10 | March 15, 2015 | Minnesota Swarm | Pepsi Center | W 12–8 | | 13,045 | 5–5 |
| 11 | March 21, 2015 | @ Vancouver Stealth | Langley Events Centre | W 14–11 | | 3,678 | 6–5 |
| 12 | March 29, 2015 | Vancouver Stealth | Pepsi Center | W 12–6 | | 13,509 | 7–5 |
| 13 | April 3, 2015 | Calgary Roughnecks | Pepsi Center | W 9–8 | OT | 15,027 | 8–5 |
| 14 | April 4, 2015 | @ Calgary Roughnecks | Scotiabank Saddledome | L 9–14 | | 9,871 | 8–6 |
| 15 | April 11, 2015 | @ Rochester Knighthawks | Blue Cross Arena | L 5–14 | | 7,988 | 8–7 |
| 16 | April 17, 2015 | Rochester Knighthawks | Pepsi Center | W 11–10 | | 15,621 | 9–7 |
| 17 | April 18, 2015 | @ Edmonton Rush | Rexall Place | L 12–13 | | 7,645 | 9–8 |
| 18 | May 2, 2015 | Edmonton Rush | Pepsi Center | L 10–13 | | 16,239 | 9–9 |

=== Playoffs ===
| Game | Date | Opponent | Location | Score | OT | Attendance | Record |
|---|---|---|---|---|---|---|---|
| Western division semi-final | May 9, 2015 | Calgary Roughnecks | Pepsi Center | L 6–11 | | 16,027 | 0–1 |

== Roster ==
Colorado Mammoth roster
| Active (21-man) roster | | Inactive roster | Coaches |
|---|---|---|---|
| Goaltenders: 27 (Canada) Alexis Buque; 45 (Canada) Dillon Ward; Defensemen: 39 (Canada) Dan Ball; 37 (Canada) Dan Coates; 77 (Canada) Tyler Codron; 18 (Canada) Robert Hope; 79 (Canada) Colton Porter; 62 (Canada) Creighton Reid; 41 (Canada) Bob Snider; 25 (Canada) Mike Woods | Forwards: 24 (Canada) John Grant, Jr. (C); 16 (Canada) Adam Jones; 51 (Canada) Eli McLaughlin; 35 (Canada) Jeremy Noble; 87 (Canada) Alex Turner; 26 (United States) Drew Westervelt; Transition: 82 (Canada) Joey Cupido; 19 (Canada) Cameron Holding | Injured reserve: 88 (Canada) Jackson Decker (T); 11 (Canada) John Gallant (D); 83 (Canada) Ian Hawksbee (D); Unable to play: 15 (United States) Eric Law (F) | Head coach {{{Head Coach}}} Legend: * Suspended list; (C) Captain; (A) Alternate captain; updated 2014-02-04; NLL Transactions |

== Transactions ==
=== Trades ===
| September 22, 2014 | To Colorado Mammoth 7th selection, 2014 entry draft | To Edmonton Rush 13th selection, 2014 entry draft 2nd round selection, 2015 entry draft |
| September 22, 2014 | To Colorado Mammoth 17th selection, 2014 entry draft | To New England Black Wolves Mike McNamara |
| December 16, 2014 | To Colorado Mammoth 4th round selection, 2015 entry draft | To New England Black Wolves Tye Belanger |

=== Entry Draft ===
The 2014 NLL Entry Draft took place on September 22, 2014. The Mammoth made the following selections:

| Round | Overall | Player | College/Club |
|---|---|---|---|
| 1 | 4 | Eli McLaughlin | |
| 1 | 7 | Robert Hope | |
| 2 | 17 | Alexis Buque | |
| 4 | 32 | Zach Rogers | |
| 5 | 41 | DJ Giacobbo | |
| 5 | 42 | Terry Ellis | |
| 6 | 50 | Mike Crampton | |

== See also ==
- 2015 NLL season
