= 2015 Minnesota Swarm season =

2015 Minnesota Swarm
- League: NLL
- Division: 4th East
- 2015 record: 6 - 12
- Home record: 3 - 6
- Road record: 3 - 6
- Goals for: 185
- Goals against: 226
- General Manager: Joe Sullivan
- Coach: Joe Sullivan
- Captain: Andrew Suitor
- Arena: Xcel Energy Center

Team leaders
- Goals: Shayne Jackson (30)
- Assists: Shayne Jackson (48)
- Points: Shayne Jackson (78)
- Penalties in minutes: Jason Noble (36)
- Loose Balls: Joel White (182)
- Wins: Zach Higgins (5)
- Goals against average: Zach Higgins (11.70)

The 2015 Minnesota Swarm season is the eleventh and final season of the Minnesota Swarm, a lacrosse team based in Saint Paul, Minnesota playing in the National Lacrosse League. Beginning in 2016 the Swarm will relocate to Duluth, Georgia and become the Georgia Swarm.

== Regular season ==
=== Current standings ===
East Division
P	Team	GP	W	L	PCT	GB	Home	Road	GF	GA	Diff	GF/GP	GA/GP
1	Toronto Rock – xyz	18	14	4	.778	0.0	7–2	7–2	230	185	+45	12.78	10.28
2	Rochester Knighthawks – x	18	12	6	.667	2.0	7–2	5–4	205	173	+32	11.39	9.61
3	Buffalo Bandits – x	18	11	7	.611	3.0	7–2	4–5	236	208	+28	13.11	11.56
4	Minnesota Swarm	18	6	12	.333	8.0	3–6	3–6	185	226	−41	10.28	12.56
5	New England Black Wolves	18	4	14	.222	10.0	2–7	2–7	186	249	−63	10.33	13.83

West Division
P	Team	GP	W	L	PCT	GB	Home	Road	GF	GA	Diff	GF/GP	GA/GP
1	Edmonton Rush – xy	18	13	5	.722	0.0	6–3	7–2	241	177	+64	13.39	9.83
2	Colorado Mammoth – x	18	9	9	.500	4.0	6–3	3–6	212	218	−6	11.78	12.11
3	Calgary Roughnecks – x	18	7	11	.389	6.0	4–5	3–6	212	217	−5	11.78	12.06
4	Vancouver Stealth	18	5	13	.278	8.0	3–6	2–7	211	265	−54	11.72	14.72

x: Clinched playoff berth; c: Clinched playoff berth by crossing over to another division; y: Clinched division; z: Clinched best regular season record; GP: Games Played
W: Wins; L: Losses; GB: Games back; PCT: Win percentage; Home: Record at Home; Road: Record on the Road; GF: Goals scored; GA: Goals allowed
Differential: Difference between goals scored and allowed; GF/GP: Average number of goals scored per game; GA/GP: Average number of goals allowed per game

=== Game log ===
Game	Date	Opponent	Location	Score	OT	Attendance	Record
1	January 3, 2015	Colorado Mammoth	Xcel Energy Center	L 13–20		8,974	0–1
2	January 10, 2015	@ Edmonton Rush	Rexall Place	W 14–10		7,415	1–1
3	January 24, 2015	@ New England Black Wolves	Mohegan Sun	W 19–13		3,563	2–1
4	January 30, 2015	@ Buffalo Bandits	First Niagara Center	L 12–15		12,756	2–2
5	February 6, 2015	Rochester Knighthawks	Xcel Energy Center	W 7–6	OT	9,645	3–2
6	February 13, 2015	Toronto Rock	Xcel Energy Center	L 4–16		8,945	3–3
7	February 14, 2015	@ Toronto Rock	Air Canada Centre	L 9–14		8,668	3–4
8	February 28, 2015	@ Vancouver Stealth	Langley Events Centre	L 15–21		3,259	3–5
9	March 14, 2015	New England Black Wolves	Xcel Energy Center	L 9–10		8,912	3–6
10	March 15, 2015	@ Colorado Mammoth	Pepsi Center	L 8–12		13,045	3–7
11	March 21, 2015	@ Buffalo Bandits	First Niagara Center	L 8–12		14,601	3–8
12	March 29, 2015	@ New England Black Wolves	Mohegan Sun	W 13–9		5,014	4–8
13	April 3, 2015	New England Black Wolves	Xcel Energy Center	W 12–8		7,599	5–8
14	April 4, 2015	@ Rochester Knighthawks	Blue Cross Arena	L 2–10		6,294	5–9
15	April 11, 2015	Buffalo Bandits	Xcel Energy Center	L 9–12		8,986	5–10
16	April 18, 2015	Calgary Roughnecks	Xcel Energy Center	L 6–10		8,131	5–11
17	April 25, 2015	Edmonton Rush	Xcel Energy Center	L 12–16		8,013	5–12
18	May 2, 2015	Rochester Knighthawks	Xcel Energy Center	W 13–12	OT	9,086	6–12

== Roster ==
Minnesota Swarm roster
Active (21-man) roster		Inactive roster	Coaches
Goaltenders: 31 (Canada) Zach Higgins; 50 (Canada) Brodie MacDonald; Defensemen: 85 (United States) Mitch Belisle; 10 (Canada) Alex Crepinsek; 8 (United States) Greg Downing; 15 (Canada) Jordan Houtby; 46 (Canada) Kiel Matisz	Forwards: 98 (Canada) Callum Crawford (A); 73 (Iroquois) Dean Hill; 32 (Canada) Shayne Jackson; 66 (Canada) Shane MacDonald; 93 (Canada) Johnny Powless; 84 (Canada) Corbyn Tao; 2 (Iroquois) Miles Thompson; Transition: 11 (United States) Sam Bradman; 33 (United States) David Earl; 24 (Canada) Jordan MacIntosh (A); 45 (Canada) Jason Noble; 37 (Canada) Ethan O'Connor; 11 (Canada) Joel White	Practice squad: 44 (Canada) Nick Cotter (T); 97 (Canada) Ian Crawford (D); 88 (Iroquois) Joe Maracle (F); 67 (Canada) Patrick Miles (D); Unable to play: -- (Canada) Matt Gibson (F); -- (Canada) Josh Gillam (F)	Head coach {{{Head Coach}}} Legend: * Suspended list; (C) Captain; (A) Alternate captain; Roster updated 2015-02-05; NLL Transactions

== Transactions ==
=== Trades ===
July 1, 2014	To Minnesota Swarm Brodie MacDonald; 3rd overall selection, 2014 entry draft (Miles Thompson)	To Edmonton Rush Tyler Carlson; 1st overall selection, 2014 entry draft (Ben McIntosh); 2nd round selection, 2015 entry draft
July 29, 2014	To Minnesota Swarm Alex Turner	To Edmonton Rush 3rd round selection, 2015 entry draft
August 13, 2014	To Minnesota Swarm Mike Grimes; 3rd round selection, 2016 entry draft	To Vancouver Stealth Tyler Hass; Dane Stevens
August 20, 2014	To Minnesota Swarm Ethan O'Connor; 1st round selection, 2017 entry draft	To Toronto Rock Brock Sorensen
September 22, 2014	To Minnesota Swarm 40th selection, 2014 entry draft	To New England Black Wolves Jay Card

=== Entry Draft ===
The 2014 NLL Entry Draft took place on September 22, 2014. The Swarm made the following selections:

Round	Overall	Player	College/Club
1	3	Miles Thompson	
1	5	Shane McDonald	
2	10	Joe Maracle	
4	29	Eric Guiltinan	
5	38	Patrick Miles	
5	40	Paxton Leroux	

== See also ==
- 2015 NLL season
