= Sean Pollock =

Canadian lacrosse player

Personal information
- Born: July 7, 1982 (age 43) Wallaceburg, Ontario, Canada
- Height: 5 ft 10 in (178 cm)
- Weight: 170 lb (77 kg; 12 st 2 lb)

Sport
- Position: Forward/Transition
- Shoots: Right
- NLL draft: 40th, 2002; Calgary Roughnecks
- NLL teams: Calgary Roughnecks; Colorado Mammoth; Minnesota Swarm; Arizona Sting
- Pro career: 2002–2015

Sean Pollock (born July 7, 1982, in Wallaceburg, Ontario Canada) is a Canadian former professional box lacrosse player. Pollock played 12 seasons in the National Lacrosse League, much of it with the Minnesota Swarm.

== Professional career ==
Sean Pollock was drafted in the 2002 National Lacrosse League Entry Draft by the Columbus Landsharks (Later the Arizona Sting), 40th overall in the 4th round. Pollock didn't see any NLL action until the 2004 season where he made five appearances for the Arizona Sting recording three points. The following season Pollock was drafted by the Minnesota Swarm in the 2005 National lacrosse league expansion draft and was signed to a one-year contract with the Swarm. Pollock spent the next seven seasons with the Swarm starting almost every game with the Swarm and broke the goal, assist and points records for the Swarm which lasted until 2012. After the 2011 season Pollock was traded with two other players to the Colorado Mammoth for a third overall pick in the Boston Blazers dispersal draft. Pollock appeared in every game for the Mammoth for 3 years until his fourth season with the Mammoth began. Midway through the season Sean Pollock was cut from the team shortly after the team acquired Jeremy Noble. Soon after being released from the Mammoth the Calgary Roughnecks signed Pollock to a one-year contract. He finished the season with 42 points in 21 games including the playoffs.

Pollock retired after the 2015 season.

== Statistics ==
		Regular Season						Playoffs
Season	Team	GP	G	A	Pts	LB	PIM	GP	G	A	Pts	LB	PIM
2004	Arizona	5	3	0	3	3	7	--	--	--	--	--	--
2005	Minnesota	13	9	16	25	0	17	--	--	--	--	--	--
2006	Minnesota	15	16	24	40	62	20	1	1	2	3	5	0
2007	Minnesota	15	26	41	67	60	28	1	0	1	1	5	0
2008	Minnesota	16	24	36	60	64	26	1	2	1	3	3	0
2009	Minnesota	15	26	39	65	74	14	--	--	--	--	--	--
2010	Minnesota	15	21	26	47	56	46	1	2	0	2	2	0
2011	Minnesota	16	9	18	27	19	33	1	0	0	0	2	0
2012	Colorado	16	26	35	61	61	12	1	0	1	1	3	0
2013	Colorado	16	15	36	51	58	11	1	0	1	1	2	0
2014	Colorado	17	23	28	51	33	15	1	1	2	3	2	0
2015	Colorado	9	9	18	27	33	21	--	--	--	--	--	--
2015	Calgary	8	6	6	12	22	0	4	1	2	3	3	2
	NLL totals	171	210	323	533	255	555	243	12	7	10	27	4
