= Mark Matthews =

American soldier (1894–2005)

- Matthews during his tenure as a Buffalo Soldier (date unknown)
- Born: August 7, 1894; Greenville, Alabama, U.S.
- Died: September 6, 2005 (aged 111 years, 30 days); Washington, D.C., U.S.
- Burial place: Arlington National Cemetery
- Military career
- Allegiance: United States of America
- Branch: United States Army
- Service years: 1910–1947/9
- Rank: First Sergeant
- Unit: 10th Cavalry
- Conflicts: Pancho Villa Expedition; World War I World War II: Battle of Saipan

Mark Matthews (August 7, 1894 – September 6, 2005) was an American soldier. Born in Alabama and growing up in Ohio, Matthews joined the 10th Cavalry Regiment when he was only 15 years old, after having been recruited at a Lexington, Kentucky, racetrack and having documents forged so that he appeared to meet the minimum age of 17. While stationed in Arizona, he joined General John J. Pershing's Mexico expedition to hunt down Mexican general Pancho Villa. He was later transferred to Virginia, where he took care of President Roosevelt and First Lady Eleanor's horses and was a member of the Buffalo Soldiers' drum and bugle corps. In his late 40s, he served in combat operations in the South Pacific during World War II and achieved the rank of first sergeant. He was noted as an excellent marksman and horse showman.

Leaving the United States Army a few years before it was integrated, Matthews then took a job as a security guard in Maryland, rising to the rank of chief of the guards and then retiring in 1970. After the war, he told stories of military experiences and grew to become a symbol of the Buffalo Soldiers. In his later years he met with Bill Clinton and Colin Powell and also dedicated a barracks in Virginia in honor of the Buffalo Soldiers. Having experienced excellent health for most of his life, Matthews died of pneumonia aged 111 and was buried in Arlington National Cemetery. At the time of his death, he was recognized as the oldest living Buffalo Soldier as well as the oldest man, and the second-oldest person, in the District of Columbia.

== Early life ==
Matthews was born in Greenville, Alabama, and grew up in Mansfield, Ohio. His horse riding career began early, when he would deliver newspapers on the back of a pony. When he was only 15 years old, he met members of the 10th Cavalry, the original Buffalo Soldier unit, while tending to horses on a racetrack in Lexington, Kentucky. Although there is disagreement as to the origins of the name "Buffalo Soldiers," it referred to several segregated units within the United States army. Although the legal age of recruitment was 17 at the time, documents were forged and Matthews signed up to join the army in Columbus, Ohio.

== Military career ==
After his training, Matthews was first stationed in Fort Huachuca in Arizona. At the time, the army was still using Native Americans as guides in the western United States. During his tenure in the state, he was regarded as an excellent marksman. Next, he joined General John J. Pershing's campaign into Mexico in 1916 to hunt for Pancho Villa. Although Matthews admitted to never having met Villa, he would claim that "I knew where he was at." During World War I, the battlefields of Europe were not conducive to cavalry; the 10th Regiment performed duty on the border with Mexico, including skirmishes with Mexicans and their German military advisors in the vicinity of Nogales, Arizona.

In 1931, he was transferred to Fort Myer in Virginia. While stationed there, Matthews and some of his troops were escorts for King George VI and his wife Queen Elizabeth when they came to visit President Franklin D. Roosevelt at the White House. He earned acclaim for his horse shows, which helped sell war bonds during World War II and he tended to First Lady Eleanor Roosevelt's personal horses. He also played on the polo team while stationed in the state.

He was also a member of the Buffalo Soldiers' drum and bugle corps, and performed at funerals in Arlington National Cemetery, where he himself would later be buried. Since the Army would not allow colored soldiers to be seen at white funerals at this time, he was forced to hide in the woods while playing "Taps". A decade later, he fought in World War II and saw combat action at the Battle of Saipan in the South Pacific. During the conflict, he rose to the rank of First Sergeant. He had originally been sent to train with the Tuskegee Airmen, but was deemed to be too old at the time.

== Later life ==
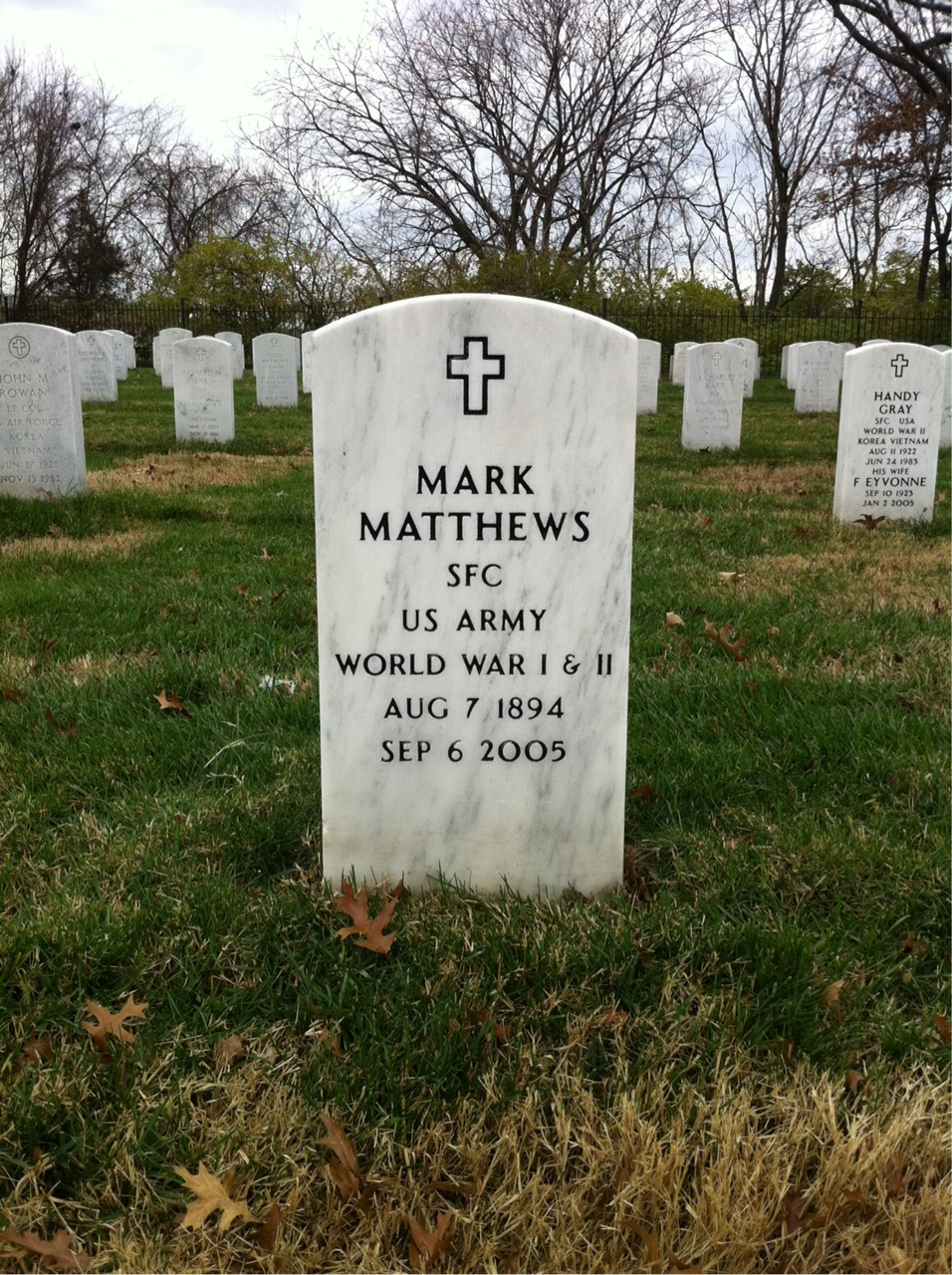
Grave at Arlington National Cemetery

Although there were conflicting reports on whether he retired from the Army in 1947, 1949 or 1950, he left the army only shortly before the Buffalo Soldiers were disbanded as part of President Harry S. Truman's initiative to integrate the Army. His next job was at the National Institutes of Health in Bethesda where he worked as a security guard. By the time he retired for a second time, in 1970, he had become the chief of the guards at the institution. He spent much of his spare time fishing, reading the Bible, and recounting tales of his extensive military experiences, which made him a popular and respected figure within the community. His wife of 57 years, Genevieve Hill Matthews, died in 1986 and one of his daughters, Shirley Ann, died two years later.

In his old age, he became a symbol for the Buffalo Soldiers. In 1994, he met with President Bill Clinton at the White House. In 1997, aged 103, Matthews was present at Arlington National Cemetery for a service honoring the Buffalo Soldiers, where he unveiled a plaque that dedicated his former barracks in honor of the soldiers. For his 108th birthday in 2002, he met with then-United States Secretary of State Colin Powell, where Powell was presented with a portrait of Matthews. He was a member of his local church, a Prince Hall Masonic Temple and the Washington chapter of the 9th and 10th Cavalry Association until his death.

Although partially blind from glaucoma by the age of 109 and completely blind from cataracts by 111, he nevertheless retained his memory and good health until his final days; his medical history showed no signs of high blood pressure, heart or kidney trouble or diabetes. He was able to walk without a cane or walker, preferring not to use one, and was able to feed himself, including Cheerios for breakfast, his favorite vanilla ice cream with his other meals and a daily can of Ensure for energy. While he enjoyed recounting tales from his military experience, he never emphasized the segregated nature of his unit, preferring instead to focus on his own exploits on the job.

Matthews died at the claimed age of 111 of pneumonia in Washington, D.C. At the time of his death, he was recognized as the oldest living former Buffalo Soldier, the oldest man in Washington and the second oldest person in Washington overall behind then-oldest American Corinne Dixon Taylor. He was survived by three of his four daughters, his son, nine grandchildren and seventeen great-grandchildren. He was buried at Arlington National Cemetery in September 2005 and Washington, D.C. Mayor Anthony A. Williams spoke at his funeral, which was also attended by councilman and future mayor Adrian Fenty.

== See also ==
- Longevity
- Supercentenarian
