= Kasey Beirnes =

Canadian lacrosse player (born 1980)

Personal information
- Born: June 17, 1980 (age 45) Elora, Ontario, Canada
- Height: 5 ft 11 in (180 cm)
- Weight: 200 lb (91 kg; 14 st 4 lb)

Sport
- Position: Forward
- Shoots: Right
- NLL team Former teams: retired Columbus Landsharks; Arizona Sting; Minnesota Swarm; Toronto Rock
- Pro career: 2002–2017

Kasey Beirnes (born June 17, 1980, in Elora, Ontario) is a Canadian former professional box lacrosse player in the National Lacrosse League. He was drafted in the third round, the 28th overall pick, by the Columbus Landsharks. He retired after 16 seasons. He played for the Columbus Landsharks, Arizona Sting, Minnesota Swarm and Toronto Rock.

== Early years ==
Beirnes was born on June 17, 1980, in Elora, Ontario. He grew up playing baseball and hockey until he was about 12, when he fell in love with lacrosse. He attended Fanshawe College.

== Professional career ==
=== NLL ===
Beirnes was drafted 28th overall by the Columbus Landsharks. As a rookie, Beirnes made the 2002 National Lacrosse League all-rookie team as a member of the Landsharks. In 2003, Beirnes had his most career assists with 35. After the 2004 season, the Landsharks moved to Arizona and become the Arizona Sting. He had his most career points that year with 62. On June 23, 2005, Beirnes and Darryl Gibson were traded to the Minnesota Swarm in exchange for two first round draft picks. In 2006, Beirnes led the Swarm in goals with 24. Beirnes was traded from the Swarm to the Toronto Rock in exchange for two picks during the 2008 draft. During the 2010 Champions Cup, Beirnes scored four goals. In 2011, Beirnes was a member of the Champions Cup winning Rock. He had 2 goals and 2 assists in the game. In 2015, Beirnes had his most career goals with 35. He retired in 2017 after 16 seasons in the NLL.

=== Not NLL ===
While with the Wellington Aces, Beirnes won the Presidents Cup. In 2013 and 2014, Beirnes was a member of the Six Nations Chiefs, who won the Mann Cup.

== Statistics ==
=== NLL ===
Kasey Beirnes		Regular season									Playoffs								
Season	Team	GP	G	A	Pts	LB	PIM	Pts/GP	LB/GP	PIM/GP	GP	G	A	Pts	LB	PIM	Pts/GP	LB/GP	PIM/GP
2002	Columbus Landsharks	16	32	13	45	78	6	2.81	4.88	0.38	–	–	–	–	–	–	–	–	–
2003	Columbus Landsharks	16	25	35	60	75	6	3.75	4.69	0.38	–	–	–	–	–	–	–	–	–
2004	Arizona Sting	16	33	29	62	61	4	3.88	3.81	0.25	–	–	–	–	–	–	–	–	–
2005	Arizona Sting	1	1	0	1	3	0	1.00	3.00	0.00	–	–	–	–	–	–	–	–	–
2006	Minnesota Swarm	15	24	28	52	60	12	3.47	4.00	0.80	1	1	0	1	9	0	1.00	9.00	0.00
2007	Minnesota Swarm	15	23	20	43	49	8	2.87	3.27	0.53	1	0	1	1	1	0	1.00	1.00	0.00
2008	Toronto Rock	16	15	14	29	57	8	1.81	3.56	0.50	–	–	–	–	–	–	–	–	–
2009	Toronto Rock	15	23	15	38	86	12	2.53	5.73	0.80	–	–	–	–	–	–	–	–	–
2010	Toronto Rock	12	20	10	30	58	2	2.50	4.83	0.17	3	7	3	10	14	0	3.33	4.67	0.00
2011	Toronto Rock	15	23	17	40	69	2	2.67	4.60	0.13	3	3	2	5	15	2	1.67	5.00	0.67
2012	Toronto Rock	16	28	25	53	78	2	3.31	4.88	0.13	2	5	0	5	15	0	2.50	7.50	0.00
2013	Toronto Rock	16	31	23	54	48	6	3.38	3.00	0.38	1	1	0	1	4	0	1.00	4.00	0.00
2014	Toronto Rock	18	27	25	52	55	2	2.89	3.06	0.11	1	4	2	6	6	0	6.00	6.00	0.00
2015	Toronto Rock	18	35	25	60	62	14	3.33	3.44	0.78	4	6	2	8	8	0	2.00	2.00	0.00
2016	Toronto Rock	17	29	13	42	48	4	2.47	2.82	0.24	–	–	–	–	–	–	–	–	–
2017	Toronto Rock	13	14	12	26	35	4	2.00	2.69	0.31	3	5	2	7	15	0	2.33	5.00	0.00
		235	383	304	687	922	92	2.92	3.92	0.39	19	32	12	44	87	2	2.32	4.58	0.11
Career Total:		254	415	316	731	1,009	94	2.88	3.97	0.37									

GP–Games played; G–Goals; A–Assists; Pts–Points; LB–Loose balls; PIM–Penalty minutes; Pts/GP–Points per games played; LB/GP–Loose balls per games played; PIM/GP–Penalty minutes per games played.
