= Scott Carnegie =

Canadian lacrosse player

- Born: December 17, 1985 (age 39); London, ON, CAN
- Height: 6 ft 1 in (1.85 m)
- Weight: 170 pounds (77 kg)
- Shoots: right
- Position: defence
- NLL teams: Calgary Roughnecks; Colorado Mammoth
- Pro career: 2008–2022

Scott Carnegie (born December 17, 1985, in London, Ontario) is a Canadian former professional box lacrosse defenceman. He wore #22 for the Calgary Roughnecks and #27 for the Colorado Mammoth in the National Lacrosse League. He is currently the Head of Player Development for the Mammoth. His brother Mike Carnegie is also a former lacrosse player. They played together for the Roughnecks from 2008 to 2017.

Carnegie joined the Roughnecks as a free agent in 2008. He missed the entire 2014 NLL season due to an Achilles injury during training camp. In the 2018 NLL season, he joined the Colorado Mammoth. He has won the NLL Championship twice: 2009 with Calgary and 2022 with Colorado.

During his time with the Calgary Roughnecks he has also worked as a Firefighter with the Rocky View County Fire Services.
