= Rob Hellyer =

Canadian lacrosse player

Personal information
- Nickname: Robbie “hell ya”
- Born: June 28, 1992 (age 34) Lion's Head, Ontario, Canada
- Height: 5 ft 8 in (173 cm)
- Weight: 220 lb (100 kg; 15 st 10 lb)

Sport
- Position: Forward
- NLL draft: 30th overall, 2010; Toronto Rock
- NLL team: Ottawa Black Bears
- team Former teams: Toronto Rock, Las Vegas Desert Dogs, San Diego Seals

Rob Hellyer (born June 28, 1992) is a Canadian professional box lacrosse player. He is a forward for the Ottawa Black Bears of the National Lacrosse League.

== Early life ==
Hellyer was born on June 28, 1992, in Lion's Head, Ontario, Canada. Growing up, he played junior lacrosse for Wiarton and was eventually called up by the Owen Sound North Stars’ organization to play with their Jr. B team. Following this, Hellyer played four years of Jr. A with the Orangeville Northmen, scoring 117 goals and 171 assists for 288 points in 69 games. While with the team, he was named to the league's second all-star team and won the Minto Cup in 2012. After his first year in Orangeville, Hellyer was drafted 30th overall by the Toronto Rock of the National Lacrosse League.

== Career ==
Following the 2010 draft, Hellyer made his NLL debut at the age of 18 due to an injury to Garrett Billings. He made his debut as the youngest player in the league on March 4, 2011, and scored a goal late in the third quarter to break a 9–9 tie. The Rock would eventually win and game and beat the Philadelphia Wings 15–10. He remained with the team as they qualified for the 2011 NLL playoffs and won the National Lacrosse League Cup. In spite of his play during the playoffs, Hellyer was not a consistent member in the Rock's lineup until the 2014 NLL season.

During the 2016 off-season, Hellyer underwent knee surgery to repair a torn ACL in his right knee and was expected to miss the 2017 NLL season. While recovering from surgery, he signed a 3-year contract extension to remain with the Rock. During the 2020 NLL season, Hellyer reached the 500-career points mark in a 13–12 win over the Rochester Knighthawks. At the time of the game, he had a total of 190 goals and 314 assists for 504 career points. At the conclusion of the season, Hellyer had scored 32 goals in 11 regular-season games to become a finalist for the NLL's Most Valuable Player. Prior to the 2021 National Lacrosse League expansion draft, Hellyer was one of twelve players protected by the Rock. Later in 2022 Rob would be traded to the Las Vegas Desert Dogs after he approached GM Jamie Dawick about a possible relocation to a team out west. He then played in San Diego on the Seals but, beginning with the 2025–2026 season, is now a member of the Ottawa Black Bears.

== Personal life ==
Hellyer works as a real estate agent for Century 21 through B.J. Roth Realty Ltd. Brokerage.
