= Curtis Dickson =

Canadian lacrosse player (born 1988)

Personal information
- Nickname: Superman
- Nationality: Canadian
- Born: July 18, 1988 (age 38)
- Height: 6 ft 2 in (188 cm)
- Weight: 195 lb (88 kg; 13 st 13 lb)

Sport
- Position: Attack/Forward
- Shoots: Right
- NCAA team: Delaware (2010)
- NLL draft: 3rd overall, 2010; Calgary Roughnecks
- NLL team Former teams: Vancouver Warriors; Calgary Roughnecks; San Diego Seals
- MLL teams: Denver Outlaws; New York Lizards
- PLL teams: Chaos LC
- Pro career: 2011–

Career highlights
- NLL: 2019 NLL Champion; Rookie Of The Year (2011); 5x Second Team All-League (2013, 2014, 2016, 2017, 2018); International: 2018 World Lacrosse Championship All World Team; NCAA: All-time Goals Scored Leader at University of Delaware
Medal record
Representing Canada
Men's lacrosse
World Lacrosse Championship
Winner	2014 Denver
Runner-up	2018 Netanya
Runner-up	2023 San Diego
Box lacrosse
World Indoor Lacrosse Championship
Winner	2015 Onondaga
Winner	2019 Langley

Curtis Dickson (born July 18, 1988) is a Canadian professional lacrosse player who currently plays for the Vancouver Warriors of the National Lacrosse League. Dickson previously played for the San Diego Seals and prior to signing with the Seals in August 2022, he also played 11 seasons with the Calgary Roughnecks. He has also played for the Chaos Lacrosse Club in the Premier Lacrosse League and Denver Outlaws and New York Lizards in the MLL.

He was a two-time All-American lacrosse player at University of Delaware from 2007 to 2010, where he served as captain of the 2010 NCAA Tournament Blue Hens team and was a member of the only Final Four team in school history.

== Lacrosse career ==
Dickson grew up in Port Coquitlam, British Columbia and honed his lacrosse skills in the Western Lacrosse Association and BC Junior A Lacrosse Leagues, on teams such as the New Westminster Salmonbellies and the Maple Ridge Burrards.

In 2007, during Delaware's Final Four run, Dickson contributed seven goals and one assist in that year's NCAA Tournament. Dickson is among the top 20 all-time in single-season goals scored and career goals scored. He completed his college career as the fourth leading scorer and all-time Delaware leader in goals, with 62 goals and 15 assists his senior season. He was a finalist for the Tewaaraton Trophy player of the year award in 2010, and finished among the all-time leaders in career goals.

In 2011, he won the NLL Rookie Of The Year Award.

Heading into the 2023 NLL season, Inside Lacrosse ranked Dickson the #8 best forward in the NLL.

On July 11, 2024, Dickson was brought back to Calgary where he spent the first 11 seasons of his career in a trade with San Diego which sent former teammate Zach Currier to the Seals also included was Calgary's 14th overall selection in the 2024 Entry Draft, and Calgary's second-round selection in the 2026 Entry Draft. Calgary also received San Diego's fourth round selection in the 2024 Entry Draft.

== Statistics ==
=== University of Delaware ===
Season	GP	G	A	Pts	PPG
2007	15	21	7	28	--
2008	16	46	16	62	--
2009	15	33	12	45	--
2010	16	62	15	77	4.5
Totals	62	162	50	212	--

=== MLL ===
Season	Team	Regular season											Playoffs										
Season	Team	GP	G	2PG	A	Pts	Sh	GB	Pen	PIM	FOW	FOA	GP	G	2PG	A	Pts	Sh	GB	Pen	PIM	FOW	FOA
2014	Denver Outlaws	5	11	0	5	16	37	1	0	0	0	0	–	–	–	–	–	–	–	–	–	–	–
2017	New York Lizards	6	13	0	1	14	36	8	0	0	0	0	–	–	–	–	–	–	–	–	–	–	–
		11	24	0	6	30	73	9	0	0	0	0	0	0	0	0	0	0	0	0	0	0	0
Career total:		11	24	0	6	30	73	9	0	0	0	0											

GP–Games played; G–Goals; 2PG–2-point goals; A–Assists; Pts–Points; Sh–Shots; GB–Ground balls; Pen–Penalties; PIM–Penalty minutes; FOW–Faceoffs won; FOA–Faceoffs attempted

=== NLL ===
Curtis Dickson		Regular season									Playoffs								
Season	Team	GP	G	A	Pts	LB	PIM	Pts/GP	LB/GP	PIM/GP	GP	G	A	Pts	LB	PIM	Pts/GP	LB/GP	PIM/GP
2011	Calgary Roughnecks	16	33	19	52	34	6	3.25	2.13	0.38	2	3	2	5	3	0	2.50	1.50	0.00
2012	Calgary Roughnecks	16	31	25	56	38	4	3.50	2.38	0.25	–	–	–	–	–	–	–	–	–
2013	Calgary Roughnecks	16	42	20	62	50	21	3.88	3.13	1.31	2	8	2	10	3	5	5.00	1.50	2.50
2014	Calgary Roughnecks	18	44	28	72	46	8	4.00	2.56	0.44	7	14	14	28	17	2	4.00	2.43	0.29
2015	Calgary Roughnecks	18	48	45	93	58	16	5.17	3.22	0.89	4	10	6	16	5	4	4.00	1.25	1.00
2017	Calgary Roughnecks	18	54	54	108	79	18	6.00	4.39	1.00	–	–	–	–	–	–	–	–	–
2018	Calgary Roughnecks	18	47	45	92	86	26	5.11	4.78	1.44	2	10	5	15	8	0	7.50	4.00	0.00
2019	Calgary Roughnecks	14	35	46	81	57	21	5.79	4.07	1.50	4	9	8	17	19	0	4.25	4.75	0.00
2020	Calgary Roughnecks	10	21	20	41	26	4	4.10	2.60	0.40	–	–	–	–	–	–	–	–	–
2022	Calgary Roughnecks	15	42	40	82	55	11	5.47	3.67	0.73	1	0	6	6	6	0	6.00	6.00	0.00
2023	San Diego Seals	18	44	56	100	72	10	5.56	4.00	0.56	1	1	5	6	4	0	6.00	4.00	0.00
2024	San Diego Seals	13	27	37	64	60	2	4.92	4.62	0.15	3	6	7	13	12	4	4.33	4.00	1.33
2025	Calgary Roughnecks	18	48	60	108	73	6	6.00	4.06	0.33	1	3	5	8	3	0	8.00	3.00	0.00
2026	Vancouver Warriors	18	42	33	75	59	12	4.17	3.28	0.67	1	1	1	2	1	4	2.00	1.00	4.00
		244	619	574	1,193	877	178	4.89	3.59	0.73	31	74	69	143	96	23	4.61	3.10	0.74
Career Total:		275	693	643	1,336	973	201	4.86	3.54	0.73									

GP–Games played; G–Goals; A–Assists; Pts–Points; LB–Loose balls; PIM–Penalty minutes; Pts/GP–Points per games played; LB/GP–Loose balls per games played; PIM/GP–Penalty minutes per games played.

=== PLL ===
Season	Team	Regular season											Playoffs										
Season	Team	GP	G	2PG	A	Pts	Sh	GB	Pen	PIM	FOW	FOA	GP	G	2PG	A	Pts	Sh	GB	Pen	PIM	FOW	FOA
2020	Chaos	7	12	0	6	18	43	7	0	0	0	0	–	–	–	–	–	–	–	–	–	–	–
		7	12	0	6	18	43	7	0	0	0	0	0	0	0	0	0	0	0	0	0	0	0
Career total:		7	12	0	6	18	43	7	0	0	0	0											

GP–Games played; G–Goals; 2PG–2-point goals; A–Assists; Pts–Points; Sh–Shots; GB–Ground balls; Pen–Penalties; PIM–Penalty minutes; FOW–Faceoffs won; FOA–Faceoffs attempted

== OLA/WLA/MSL statistics ==
			Regular Season					Playoffs
Season	Team	League	GP	G	A	Pts	PIM	GP	G	A	Pts	PIM
2007	Owen Sound Crescents	MSL	14	43	35	78	4	6	14	18	32	2
2008	Brampton Excelsiors	MSL	--	--	--	--	--	7	9	13	22	10
2009	Owen Sound Crescents	MSL	8	16	25	41	11	15	21	37	58	12
2010	Maple Ridge	WLA	12	18	16	34	--	6	5	11	16	2
PRO/MAJOR/SENIOR TOTALS			32	456	376	832	39	34	49	79	128	26

== See also ==
- Delaware Fighting Blue Hens men's lacrosse

== Awards ==
Preceded by Stephan Leblanc	NLL Rookie of the Year; 2011	Succeeded by Adam Jones
