= Stephan Leblanc =

Canadian lacrosse player

- Born: January 20, 1986; Dundas, Ontario (now Hamilton, Ontario)
- Nationality: Canadian
- Height: 6 ft 1 in (1.85 m)
- Weight: 205 pounds (93 kg)
- Shoots: left
- Position: Forward
- NLL draft: 11th overall, 2009; Toronto Rock
- NLL teams: Toronto Rock; New England Black Wolves; Halifax Thunderbirds; Georgia Swarm
- Pro career: 2010–2022

Career highlights
- NLL: Rookie of the Year (2010); NLL Cup (2011)

Stephan Leblanc (born January 20, 1986) is a former Canadian professional box lacrosse player having played for the Toronto Rock, New England Black Wolves, Halifax Thunderbirds and Georgia Swarm in the National Lacrosse League. In November 2022, he announced is retirement as a player.

Leblanc was chosen by the Rock in the first round of the 2009 NLL entry draft, and joined the team along with fellow draft choice Garrett Billings in the 2010 season. He was named Rookie of the Month for both February and April, and after scoring 82 points in his rookie year, was named NLL Rookie of the Year.

In 2020, Leblanc became the second men's lacrosse player inducted into the Queens Athletics Hall of Fame.

== Statistics ==
=== NLL ===
Stephan Leblanc		Regular Season									Playoffs								
Season	Team	GP	G	A	Pts	LB	PIM	Pts/GP	LB/GP	PIM/GP	GP	G	A	Pts	LB	PIM	Pts/GP	LB/GP	PIM/GP
2010	Toronto Rock	16	36	46	82	76	12	5.13	4.75	0.75	3	8	9	17	14	0	5.67	4.67	0.00
2011	Toronto Rock	15	33	43	76	75	8	5.07	5.00	0.53	3	4	5	9	14	0	3.00	4.67	0.00
2012	Toronto Rock	16	28	37	65	65	8	4.06	4.06	0.50	2	1	4	5	12	0	2.50	6.00	0.00
2013	Toronto Rock	16	22	36	58	80	14	3.63	5.00	0.88	1	1	0	1	5	8	1.00	5.00	8.00
2014	Toronto Rock	18	45	43	88	93	27	4.89	5.17	1.50	1	0	3	3	2	0	3.00	2.00	0.00
2015	Toronto Rock	18	31	55	86	96	15	4.78	5.33	0.83	4	5	11	16	20	2	4.00	5.00	0.50
2016	Toronto Rock	17	32	38	70	78	24	4.12	4.59	1.41	–	–	–	–	–	–	–	–	–
2017	Toronto Rock	15	20	53	73	76	6	4.87	5.07	0.40	3	4	9	13	8	0	4.33	2.67	0.00
2018	Toronto Rock	2	2	1	3	9	0	1.50	4.50	0.00	–	–	–	–	–	–	–	–	–
2018	New England Black Wolves	17	25	45	70	70	12	4.12	4.12	0.71	1	3	1	4	3	0	4.00	3.00	0.00
2019	New England Black Wolves	18	27	66	93	58	13	5.17	3.22	0.72	1	0	2	2	5	0	2.00	5.00	0.00
2020	New England Black Wolves	10	8	28	36	45	2	3.60	4.50	0.20	–	–	–	–	–	–	–	–	–
2022	Halifax Thunderbirds	10	8	26	34	39	2	3.40	3.90	0.20	–	–	–	–	–	–	–	–	–
2022	Georgia Swarm	6	6	9	15	31	0	2.50	5.17	0.00	–	–	–	–	–	–	–	–	–
		194	323	526	849	891	143	4.38	4.59	0.74	19	26	44	70	83	10	3.68	4.37	0.53
Career Total:		213	349	570	919	974	153	4.31	4.57	0.72									

GP–Games played; G–Goals; A–Assists; Pts–Points; LB–Loose balls; PIM–Penalty minutes; Pts/GP–Points per games played; LB/GP–Loose balls per games played; PIM/GP–Penalty minutes per games played.

== Awards ==
Preceded by Rhys Duch	NLL Rookie of the Year; 2010	Succeeded by Curtis Dickson
