= Rhys Duch =

Canadian lacrosse player

Rhys W. Duch
Personal information
- Nationality: Canadian
- Born: July 14, 1986 (age 39) Victoria, British Columbia, Canada
- Height: 5 ft 11 in (180 cm)
- Weight: 200 lb (91 kg; 14 st 4 lb)

Sport
- Position: Forward
- Shoots: Right
- NLL draft: 3rd overall, 2008; San Jose Stealth
- NLL team: Saskatchewan Rush
- WLA team: Victoria Shamrocks
- Pro career: 2009–

Rhys W. Duch (born July 14, 1986, in Victoria, British Columbia) is a Canadian professional box lacrosse player for the Saskatchewan Rush of the National Lacrosse League. During high school, he played for three years at Baggataway Club in Victoria, B.C. He was a two-time Provincial and overall MVP selection, and an eight-time Provincial All-Star.

== College career ==
Duch played college lacrosse for the Stony Brook University Seawolves.

In 2005, he was an America East All-Rookie pick. He scored two goals in the America East Championship game vs Albany (5/7); tallied three points on two goals and one assist in the win over Vermont (4/16); had one assist and one goal in the win over Hartford (4/9); recorded four points on three goals and one assist vs Army (4/5); tallied three points on two goals and one assist vs Albany (4/2); totaled three points with one goal and two assists to help boost the Brook over Wagner (3/5); registered two goals against UMass; and tallied three points on two goals and one assist in the win over Rutgers (3/22).

In 2006, Duch as named to the All-America East second team. He appeared in all 15 games and recorded 22 points off 15 goals and seven assists, and scooped up 16 ground balls During the season, he handed out an assist and picked up three ground balls versus Harvard (3/4); tallied a goal and recorded three ground balls at Army (3/7); dished an assist at home against Rutgers (3/28); tallied two goals in America East opening win against Vermont (4/1); tallied a goal and an assist in win over Denver (4/3); had a career game at Albany (4/8), registering six points off five goals and an assist to lead the Seawolves to victory and earn America East Player of the Week honors; recorded a goal and two assists in a win at Lehigh (4/12); registered a goal and an assist vs. Hartford (4/15); found the back of the cage three times and scooped up three ground balls in a win over in-state rival Binghamton (4/22); and scored a goal against Hofstra (4/25).

In 2007, he saw action in all 13 games for the Seawolves with a pair of starts, a pair of multi-goal games, and scored points in eight contests. He scored a goal and assist vs. Virginia (2/28); two points on a goal and assist vs. Lehigh (3/24); a pair of goals at Siena (4/10); and another pair of goals in the OT win at #20 Hofstra (4/24).

In 2008, Duch played in every game with nine starts, was named to the second team All-America East, and led the Seawolves with a career-high 28 assists. That mark placed him seventh in the Stoney Brook record book for assists in a season. He finished fifth in the nation with his 2.0 assists per game average. He was second on the team in ground balls with a career-high 44, third on the team in points (41), and sixth in goals (13). He finished his career 14th all-time at Stoney Brook with 106 points, with at least one point in every game but two.; He scored three goals and a pair of assists vs. Siena (3/8); had a career high seven points (1g, 6a) at Delaware (3/15); tallied a career best six ground balls vs. Marist (3/25); scored seven points again (3g, 4a) at UMBC (3/29); and five points (1g, 4a) against Vermont (4/5) (that capped a seven-game run that saw him accumulate 33 points); and scored two assists and 10 shots against Albany (5/1) in the America East Semifinals.

== WLA career ==
Plays for the Victoria Shamrocks. During the 2008 season, he played in 9 games, scored 15 goals and 17 assists. He was the Shamrocks top scorer in 2007.

== Statistics ==
=== NLL ===
Rhys Duch		Regular season									Playoffs								
Season	Team	GP	G	A	Pts	LB	PIM	Pts/GP	LB/GP	PIM/GP	GP	G	A	Pts	LB	PIM	Pts/GP	LB/GP	PIM/GP
2009	San Jose Stealth	16	35	54	89	97	4	5.56	6.06	0.25	2	4	4	8	10	0	4.00	5.00	0.00
2010	Washington Stealth	16	33	53	86	70	4	5.38	4.38	0.25	3	11	14	25	24	0	8.33	8.00	0.00
2011	Washington Stealth	16	42	48	90	74	6	5.63	4.63	0.38	3	5	10	15	14	0	5.00	4.67	0.00
2012	Washington Stealth	14	33	46	79	84	17	5.64	6.00	1.21	0	0	0	0	0	0	0.00	0.00	0.00
2013	Washington Stealth	16	45	51	96	62	6	6.00	3.88	0.38	3	10	7	17	10	0	5.67	3.33	0.00
2014	Vancouver Stealth	17	36	44	80	83	28	4.71	4.88	1.65	0	0	0	0	0	0	0.00	0.00	0.00
2015	Vancouver Stealth	18	41	62	103	63	10	5.72	3.50	0.56	0	0	0	0	0	0	0.00	0.00	0.00
2016	Vancouver Stealth	18	48	63	111	83	8	6.17	4.61	0.44	0	0	0	0	0	0	0.00	0.00	0.00
2017	Vancouver Stealth	17	38	56	94	70	7	5.53	4.12	0.41	1	0	2	2	0	0	2.00	0.00	0.00
2018	Vancouver Stealth	18	19	46	65	73	9	3.61	4.06	0.50	0	0	0	0	0	0	0.00	0.00	0.00
2019	Calgary Roughnecks	18	27	47	74	66	2	4.11	3.67	0.11	4	4	7	11	17	0	2.75	4.25	0.00
2020	Calgary Roughnecks	6	8	17	25	17	0	4.17	2.83	0.00	0	0	0	0	0	0	0.00	0.00	0.00
2022	Halifax Thunderbirds	2	3	1	4	3	0	2.00	1.50	0.00	0	0	0	0	0	0	0.00	0.00	0.00
2023	Colorado Mammoth	8	10	23	33	25	2	4.13	3.13	0.25	0	0	0	0	0	0	0.00	0.00	0.00
2023	Saskatchewan Rush	5	4	5	9	10	0	1.80	2.00	0.00	0	0	0	0	0	0	0.00	0.00	0.00
		205	422	616	1,038	880	103	5.06	4.29	0.50	16	34	44	78	75	0	4.88	4.69	0.00
Career Total:		221	456	660	1,116	955	103	5.05	4.32	0.47									

GP–Games played; G–Goals; A–Assists; Pts–Points; LB–Loose balls; PIM–Penalty minutes; Pts/GP–Points per games played; LB/GP–Loose balls per games played; PIM/GP–Penalty minutes per games played.

== Awards ==
Preceded by Craig Point	NLL Rookie of the Year; 2009	Succeeded by Stephan Leblanc
