= Mike Carnegie =

Canadian lacrosse player

Personal information
- Born: March 4, 1984 (age 42) London, Ontario, Canada
- Height: 5 ft 10 in (178 cm)
- Weight: 190 lb (86 kg; 13 st 8 lb)

Sport
- Position: defence
- Shoots: right
- NLL teams: Calgary Roughnecks; San Diego Seals
- Pro career: 2008–2020

Mike Carnegie (born March 4, 1984) is a Canadian former professional box lacrosse defender. He wore #16 for the Calgary Roughnecks and San Diego Seals in the National Lacrosse League. He won the Champion's Cup with the Roughnecks in 2009 and the Mann Cup in 2008 and 2009 with Brampton Excelsiors. In 2011, he won the gold medal at 2011 FIL World Indoor Lacrosse Championship playing for Team Canada.

In 2011, Carnegie was named one of Calgary's "Top 40 Under 40" by Avenue Magazine. He donates half of his NLL salary to charity, especially to assist the people of Burma, and is Christian. His wife Hailey is also actively involved in his charitable work. His younger brother Scott Carnegie is also a lacrosse player.

Carnegie was the captain of the Western Ontario Mustangs lacrosse team.
