= 2013 NLL season =

- League: National Lacrosse League
- Sport: Indoor lacrosse
- Duration: January 4, 2013 – May 11, 2013
- Games: 16
- Teams: 9
- TV partner: CBS Sports Network

Draft
- Top draft pick: Mark Matthews
- Picked by: Edmonton Rush

Regular Season
- Top seed: Toronto Rock
- Season MVP: Shawn Evans (Calgary Roughnecks)
- Top scorer: Shawn Evans (Calgary Roughnecks)

Playoffs
- Finals champions: Rochester Knighthawks (4th title)
- Runners-up: Washington Stealth
- Finals MVP: Cody Jamieson (Knighthawks)

NLL seasons
- ← 2012 season 2014 season →

The 2013 National Lacrosse League season, the 27th in the history of the NLL, began on January 5, 2013 and ended with the Championship game on May 11, 2013. The Rochester Knighthawks overcame a mediocre 8-8 season to get hot in the playoffs for the second straight year, defeating the Philadelphia Wings, Minnesota Swarm, and Washington Stealth to win their second straight Championship. The Knighthawks became the first team to repeat as NLL Champions since the 2002-2003 Toronto Rock.

2013 featured a very close regular season, as the top and bottom teams were only separated by 4 games (the 10-6 Toronto Rock vs. 6-10 Buffalo Bandits). The final playoff spot was up for grabs right up until the final weekend of the season. In the end, the Bandits were the lone team out of the playoffs, missed the post-season for the first time since 2002.

== Teams ==
2013 National Lacrosse League
Division	Team	City	Arena	Capacity
East	Buffalo Bandits	Buffalo, New York	First Niagara Center	19,070
East	Philadelphia Wings	Philadelphia, Pennsylvania	Wachovia Center	19,537
East	Rochester Knighthawks	Rochester, New York	Blue Cross Arena	10,662
East	Toronto Rock	Toronto, Ontario	Air Canada Centre	18,800
West	Calgary Roughnecks	Calgary, Alberta	Scotiabank Saddledome	19,289
West	Colorado Mammoth	Denver, Colorado	Pepsi Center	18,007
West	Edmonton Rush	Edmonton, Alberta	Rexall Place	16,839
West	Minnesota Swarm	Saint Paul, Minnesota	XCEL Energy Center	18,064
West	Washington Stealth	Everett, Washington	Comcast Arena at Everett	8,513

=== Map of teams ===
East Division West Division

== Final standings ==
East Division
P	Team	GP	W	L	PCT	GB	Home	Road	GF	GA	Diff	GF/GP	GA/GP
1	Toronto Rock – xyz	16	10	6	.625	0.0	5–3	5–3	194	176	+18	12.12	11.00
2	Rochester Knighthawks – x	16	8	8	.500	2.0	3–5	5–3	179	165	+14	11.19	10.31
3	Philadelphia Wings – x	16	7	9	.438	3.0	4–4	3–5	170	207	−37	10.62	12.94
4	Buffalo Bandits	16	6	10	.375	4.0	2–6	4–4	171	211	−40	10.69	13.19

West Division
P	Team	GP	W	L	PCT	GB	Home	Road	GF	GA	Diff	GF/GP	GA/GP
1	Calgary Roughnecks – xy	16	9	7	.562	0.0	3–5	6–2	222	211	+11	13.88	13.19
2	Washington Stealth – x	16	9	7	.562	0.0	5–3	4–4	193	192	+1	12.06	12.00
3	Edmonton Rush – x	16	9	7	.562	0.0	2–6	7–1	203	170	+33	12.69	10.62
4	Colorado Mammoth – x	16	7	9	.438	2.0	3–5	4–4	185	202	−17	11.56	12.62
5	Minnesota Swarm – c	16	7	9	.438	2.0	5–3	2–6	219	202	+17	13.69	12.62

x: Clinched playoff berth; c: Clinched playoff berth by crossing over to another division; y: Clinched division; z: Clinched best regular season record; GP: Games Played
W: Wins; L: Losses; GB: Games back; PCT: Win percentage; Home: Record at Home; Road: Record on the Road; GF: Goals scored; GA: Goals allowed
Differential: Difference between goals scored and allowed; GF/GP: Average number of goals scored per game; GA/GP: Average number of goals allowed per game

== Statistical leaders ==
=== Scoring leaders ===
Note: GP = Games played; G = Goals; A = Assists; Pts = Points; PIM = Penalty minutes; LB = Loose Balls The following players lead the league in regular season points at the conclusion of games played on May 11, 2013.

Player	Team	GP	G	A	Pts	PIM	LB
Shawn Evans	Calgary Roughnecks	16	32	80	112	25	69
Garrett Billings	Toronto Rock	16	30	70	100	4	66
Rhys Duch	Washington Stealth	16	45	51	96	6	62
Callum Crawford	Minnesota Swarm	14	32	63	95	2	55
John Grant Jr.	Colorado Mammoth	16	43	48	91	22	42
Cody Jamieson	Rochester Knighthawks	16	28	61	89	25	56
Colin Doyle	Toronto Rock	15	26	58	84	13	41
Ryan Benesch	Minnesota Swarm	16	34	50	84	14	59
Ryan Ward	Edmonton Rush	16	21	54	75	6	29
Dan Dawson	Rochester Knighthawks	16	23	52	75	4	67

=== Leading goaltenders ===
Note: GP = Games played; Mins = Minutes played; W = Wins; L = Losses: GA = Goals Allowed; SV% = Save Percentage; GAA = Goals against average

The following goaltenders lead the league at the conclusion regular season on May 11, 2013.

Player	Team	GP	MP	W	L	GA	SV%	GAA
Matt Vinc	Rochester Knighthawks	16	955:29	8	8	162	.803	10.17
Aaron Bold	Edmonton Rush	16	857:56	8	5	151	.744	10.56
Nick Rose	Toronto Rock	16	905:01	10	5	160	.791	10.61
Tye Belanger	Colorado Mammoth	9	412:13	5	2	74	.776	10.77
Tyler Richards	Washington Stealth	15	818:50	8	5	149	.795	10.92

== Playoffs ==
Divisional Semifinal
E1	Toronto Rock	11
W5	Minnesota Swarm	20
Eastern Division
E2	Rochester Knighthawks	10
E3	Philadelphia Wings	8
W1	Calgary Roughnecks	15
W4	Colorado Mammoth	10
Western Division
W2	Washington Stealth	12
W3	Edmonton Rush	11

Divisional Final
W5	Minnesota Swarm	10
E2	Rochester Knighthawks	12
W1	Calgary Roughnecks	13
W2	Washington Stealth	14

Champion's Cup Final
W2	Washington Stealth	10
E2	Rochester Knighthawks	11

•Final played at Langley Events Centre due to arena conflict in Washington.

NOTE: In 2013, the NLL added a crossover rule to the playoff format:

"Eight teams shall earn playoff berths. There is also a crossover allowed which will allow the 5th place team in the West Division to take the place of the 4th place team in the East Division if the 5th place team has a better record. Each division champion faces the fourth place finisher from their division (or the crossover team should that team qualify for the playoffs). The second place finisher in each division faces the third place finisher from their division in the Division Semifinals. Each game is hosted by the higher-seeded team."

With a record of 7-9, the Minnesota Swarm was the 5th place West Division team. With a record of 6-10, the Buffalo Bandits were the 4th place East Division team. Since Minnesota had a better record than Buffalo, the crossover rule went into effect with Minnesota replacing Buffalo and playing as the 4th place team in the East Division playoffs.

=== Division semifinals ===
==== (E1) Toronto Rock vs. (W5) Minnesota Swarm ====
April 28, 2013	Toronto Rock	11–20 (4–5, 1–5, 3–4, 3–6)	Minnesota Swarm	Air Canada Centre; Attendance: 9,066

Game reference

Nick Rose
Zak Boychuk
Goalies
Tyler Carlson

Doyle (Billings) (PP) – 03:20	1–0
	1–1	03:57 – Matisz (Crawford, Earl)
	1–2	07:42 – Benesch (MacIntosh) (PP)
Evans (Billings) – 08:26	2–2
Belton – 09:27	3–2
	3–3	10:06 – MacIntosh (Earl)
	3–4	10:47 – Card (Benesch, Crawford)
	3–5	11:24 – Jackson (Crawford)
Beirnes (Doyle, Billings) (PP) – 13:19	4–5
	4–6	16:21 – Jackson (Sorensen) (SH)
	4–7	21:34 – Jackson (Benesch, Matisz)
	4–8	22:51 – Card
	4–9	24:11 – Benesch (Matisz, Crawford)
Evans – 26:44	5–9
	5–10	29:02 – Benesch (Jackson) (PP)
	5–11	33:36 – MacIntosh (Ball, Carlson)
Edwards (Chapman) – 34:52	6–11
	6–12	38:13 – Matisz (Crawford, Watt)
Doyle (Evans) – 38:45	7–12
	7–13	39:21 – MacIntosh
Doyle (Billings, Hobbins) – 43:43	8–13
	8–14	44:59 – Gillam (Jackson, Benesch)
	8–15	45:29 – MacIntosh (Earl)
	8–16	45:57 – Matisz (Crawford, Jackson)
	8–17	46:17 – Jackson (Crawford, Benesch) (PP)
	8–18	51:20 – Tao (Benesch, Card) (PP)
	8–19	52:22 – Gillam (MacIntosh, Benesch) (PP)
Chapman (Sanderson) – 47:55	9–19
Leblanc (Manning, Doyle) (SH) – 54:05	10–19
	10–20	55:56 – Gillam (Card, Matisz) (PP)
Manning (Doyle, Billings) (PP) – 59:31	11–20

47 min
Penalties
27 min
65
Shots
55

==== (E2) Rochester Knighthawks vs. (E3) Philadelphia Wings ====
April 27, 2013	Rochester Knighthawks	10–8 (3–0, 3–4, 1–2, 3–2)	Philadelphia Wings	Blue Cross Arena; Attendance: 5,963

Game reference

Matt Vinc
Goalies
Brandon Miller

D. Dawson (Keogh, Jamieson) – 06:07	1–0
Walters (Burton) – 09:45	2–0
D. Dawson (Jamieson, Campbell) – 14:34	3–0
	3–1	15:21 – Mundorf (Westervelt, Buchanan)
	3–2	16:24 – Buchanan (Merrill, Miller)
Jamieson (B. Self) – 18:33	4–2
	4–3	18:56 – Westervelt (Buchanan, Mundorf)
	4–4	20:11 – Westervelt (Sweeney, Merrill) (SH)
D. Dawson (Powless) (PP) – 20:37	5–4
D. Dawson (Walters, Powless) – 25:10	6–4
	6–5	32:07 – Crowley (Hall, Ross) (PP)
Keogh (Powless) – 36:51	7–5
	7–6	43:23 – Crowley (Reynolds, White)
	7–7	45:21 – Mundorf (Westervelt, Rabil)
Point (D. Dawson, Walters) (PP) – 54:20	8–7
P. Dawson (Smith) – 58:37	9–7
Accursi (Keogh, D. Dawson)	10–7
	10–8	59:53 – Reynolds

11 min
Penalties
10 min
38
Shots
37

==== (W1) Calgary Roughnecks vs. (W4) Colorado Mammoth ====
April 27, 2013	Calgary Roughnecks	15–10 (4–3, 3–4, 0–4, 4–3)	Colorado Mammoth	Scotiabank Saddledome; Attendance: 8,726

Game reference

Mike Poulin
Frankie Scigliano
Goalies
Tye Belanger
Dan Lewis

	0–1	02:01 – Jones (Powell, McBride)
	0–2	04:01 – Grant (Powell, Reid) – 04:01
Ranger (Shattler, Evans) – 05:41	1–2
Shattler (Resetarits, Veltman) – 06:10	2–2
Evans (Shattler, Veltman) – 07:02	3–2
	3–3	13:25 – MacLeod (McBride)
Evans (Dobbie, Veltman) – 14:43	4–3
	4–4	17:31 – Jones (Grant)
	4–5	19:15 – Powell (McBride, MacLeod) (PP)
McFetridge (Dobbie) – 19:40	5–5
	5–6	24:19 – Jones (Powell, Grant)
Dickson (Ranger, Dobbie) – 25:15	6–6
	6–7	25:58 – Powell (Jones, Coates)
Resetarits (Dobbie, Veltman) – 29:20	7–7
Ranger (McBride, Harnett) (SH) – 35:07	8–7
Shattler (McFetridge, Snider) (SH) – 38:10	9–7
Veltman (Dickson, Snider) – 39:14	10–7
Cornwall (Evans) – 42:27	11–7
Ranger (Veltman) (PP) – 45:21	12–7
Heavenor (Shattler) – 47:26	13–7
	13–8	47:53 – Powell (Grant, Coates)
Evans (Shattler, McBride) – 49:33	14–8
Shattler (Cornwall) – 57:31	15–8
	15–9	58:53 – Jones (Pollock, McBride)
	15–10	59:33 – Grant (McBride)

13 min
Penalties
8 min
56
Shots
44

==== (W2) Washington Stealth vs. (W3) Edmonton Rush ====
April 27, 2013	Washington Stealth	12–11 (0–4, 2–3, 7–3, 3–1)	Edmonton Rush	Comcast Arena at Everett; Attendance: 3,022

Game reference

Tyler Richards
Matt Roik
Goalies
Aaron Bold

	0–1	05:38 – Knight (Small, Thompson)
	0–2	12:38 – Small (Davis, Conway)
	0–3	12:57 – Small (Knight, Ward)
	0–4	14:31 – LaFontaine (Corbeil, Rubisch)
	0–5	16:12 – Matthews (Small)
	0–6	16:43 – Small (Conway)
Duch (Hill, Bucktooth) (PP) – 19:03	1–6
	1–7	27:07 – Matthews (Ward, Small) (PP)
Iannucci (Grimes, Hostrawser) – 28:36	2–7
Duch (Ratcliff, Smith) – 30:20	3–7
Duch (Iannucci, Ratcliff) (PP) – 31:04	4–7
	4–8	32:47 – Cornwall
Garrison (Richards) – 35:22	5–8
Duch (Bucktooth, Smith) – 35:47	6–8
	6–9	38:51 – Davis (Matthews)
Garrison (Richards) – 42:07	7–9
	7–10	43:00 – Turner (Matthews, Quinlan)
Iannucci (Duch, Bucktooth) – 43:29	8–10
Grimes (Richards) – 44:59	9–10
Moleski – 45:22	10–10
Ratcliff (Bucktooth) – 47:20	11–10
Bucktooth (Duch, Ratcliff) (PP) – 48:29	12–10
	12–11	54:48 – Davis (Ward, Thompson)

18 min
Penalties
16 min
54
Shots
48

=== Division Finals ===
==== (E2) Rochester Knighthawks vs. (W5) Minnesota Swarm ====
May 4, 2013	Rochester Knighthawks	12–10 (3–0, 2–5, 2–1, 5–4)	Minnesota Swarm	Blue Cross Arena; Attendance: 5,093

Game reference

Matt Vinc
Goalies
Tyler Carlson

Powless (Accursi, Jamieson) – 02:03	1–0
Powless (Vitarelli, Jamieson)	2–0
Walters (B. Self, Smith) – 09:52	3–0
	3–1	20:35 – Matisz (Crawford, Sorensen)
	3–2	21:02 – Crawford (Benesch)
Point (D. Dawson) – 21:35	4–2
	4–3	23:26 – Crawford (Gillam, Matisz)
Point (Keogh, Jamieson) – 24:10	5–3
	5–4	29:01 – Benesch (Crawford)
	5–5	29:17 – MacIntosh (Crepinsek)
D. Dawson – 32:24	6–5
Accursi (Walters, Powless) – 42:10	7–5
	7–6	43:17 – Benesch (Tao, Matisz)
	7–7	49:41 – Benesch (Crawford)
	7–8	50:34 – Matisz (Benesch, Crawford)
	7–9	51:21 – Jackson (Crawford, Benesch) (PP)
Powless (Walters) – 53:22	8–9
Point (Keogh) – 54:17	9–9
Jamieson (Accursi) – 55:12	10–9
Point (Jamieson, D. Dawson) – 58:20	11–9
Purves – 58:46	12–9
	12–10	59:47 – Benesch (Crawford, MacIntosh)

8 min
Penalties
10 min
42
Shots
35

==== (W1) Calgary Roughnecks vs. (W2) Washington Stealth ====
May 4, 2013	Calgary Roughnecks	13–14 (0–2, 5–6, 5–3, 3–3)	Washington Stealth	Scotiabank Saddledome; Attendance: 9,583

Game reference

Mike Poulin
Goalies
Tyler Richards

	0–1	08:15 – Smith (Ratcliff, Iannucci)
	0–2	10:08 – Ratcliff (Iannucci, Bucktooth)
Evans (Shattler) (PP) – 15:49	1–2
Dobbie (MacRae, Carnegie) (SH) – 17:10	2–2
	2–3	19:11 – Iannucci (Duch, Moleski)
	2–4	19:23 – Salt
	2–5	21:47 – Iannucci (Duch, Grimes)
Dobbie (Evans) – 22:51	3–5
Dobbie (Veltman) – 23:05	4–5
Resetarits (Shattler, Cornwall) (SH) – 25:40	5–5
	5–6	26:31 – Duch (Hill, Snider) (PP)
	5–7	27:42 – Bucktooth (Ratcliff)
	5–8	29:02 – Iannucci (Duch, Smith)
	5–9	30:30 – Henderson (Garrison, Richards)
	5–10	32:49 – Hill (Ratcliff, Iannucci) (PP)
Dickson (McBride, Snider) (SH) – 33:15	6–10
Dickson (McFetridge, Heavenor) (PP) – 35:37	7–10
Dickson (Evans) – 36:11	8–10
	8–11	37:38 – Bucktooth (Duch)
Dickson (Shattler, McBride) – 38:30	9–11
Ranger (Dobbie, Dickson) – 40:06	10–11
Dickson (Dobbie) – 46:44	11–11
	11–12	48:58 – Duch (Bucktooth, Smith)
Dickson (McBride) – 50:36	12–12
	12–13	51:04 – Salt (Sorensen, Grimes)
Dickson (Evans, Shattler) – 52:05	13–13
	13–14	53:06 – Duch (Iannucci, Smith)

8 min
Penalties
6 min
43
Shots
52

=== NLL Finals ===
==== (W2) Washington Stealth vs. (E2) Rochester Knighthawks ====
May 11, 2013	Washington Stealth	10–11 (2–5, 5–5, 2–0, 1–1)	Rochester Knighthawks	Xfinity Arena; Attendance: 5,200

Game reference

Tyler Richards
Goalies
Matt Vinc

	0–1	03:16 – Vitarelli (Walters, Jamieson)
Duch (Bucktooth, Iannucci) – 03:56	1–1
	1–2	05:58 – Jamieson (D. Dawson, Smith)
Iannucci (PP) – 06:27	2–2
	2–3	10:00 – D. Dawson (Point, Powless)
	2–4	10:25 – B. Self (Burton)
	2–5	12:29 – Accursi (D. Dawson, Walters)
Ratcliff (Smith, Moleski) – 17:19	3–5
	3–6	17:47 – Jamieson (D. Dawson, Powless)
	3–7	19:39 – Jamieson (Walters)
Garrison (Grimes, Sorensen) – 20:33	4–7
Smith (Bucktooth, Duch) – 21:09	5–7
Duch (Ratcliff, Bucktooth) (PP) – 23:18	6–7
Smith (Ratcliff) – 24:16	7–7
	7–8	25:09 – Vitarelli (Jamieson, Walters)
	7–9	27:13 –Powless (Jamieson, Walters)
	7–10	27:51 – Point (D. Dawson, Vitarelli)
Duch (Ratcliff, Bucktooth) – 33:29	8–10
Bucktooth (Iannucci) – 35:55	9–10
	9–11	47:24 – Walters (Accursi, Point)
Garrison – 48:19	10–11

8 min
Penalties
12 min
49
Shots
49

== Milestones and events ==
=== Pre-season ===
- August 13, 2012: The league announced that the 2012 entry draft would be held in Toronto on October 1. There would also be a player combine the day before the draft at the new Toronto Rock practice facility in Oakville, Ontario.
- October 2, 2012: Former NLL goaltender and current Buffalo Bandits GM Steve Dietrich was inducted into the National Lacrosse League Hall of Fame in a ceremony in Toronto.
- December 8, 2012: The Calgary Roughnecks defeated the Colorado Mammoth 20-11 in a pre-season game at the Langley Events Centre in Langley, British Columbia. This was the second pre-season game at the LEC, as the Toronto Rock and Washington Stealth played there in 2012.
- December 14, 2012: The National Lacrosse League returned to Montreal as the Toronto Rock defeated the Rochester Knighthawks 14-10 at the Bell Centre in front of 7,269 fans.
- December 14, 2012: In a blockbuster trade, NLL superstar Dan Dawson was traded to the Rochester Knighthawks along with his brother Paul Dawson and a first-round draft pick in 2016 for Paul Rabil, Jordan Hall, Joel White, Robbie Campbell, and a second round draft pick in 2014.
- December 20, 2012: Kaleb Toth, the longest-serving member of the Calgary Roughnecks, announced his retirement from the NLL.

=== Regular season ===
- January 22, 2013: Buffalo Bandits forward Shawn Williams continued his record-setting consecutive game streak, playing in his 200th consecutive NLL game.
- February 15, 2013: The rare "sock-trick" was accomplished twice on the same night, as Edmonton Rush rookie Mark Matthews and Toronto Rock forward Garrett Billings scored six goals each to lead their teams to victory.
- February 25, 2013: Minnesota Swarm captain Andrew Suitor suffered a knee injury in a game against the Edmonton Rush, ending his 2013 season.
- March 12, 2013: Former league MVP Casey Powell was traded by the Rochester Knighthawks to the Colorado Mammoth in exchange for Jon Sullivan and a 3rd round draft pick in 2014.
- March 14, 2013: Buffalo Bandits GM and retired goaltender Steve Dietrich traded a 6th round draft pick to the Toronto Rock for his own playing rights.
- March 15, 2013: The league announced that the regular season schedule would be expanded to 18 games for the 2014 NLL season. The league had been playing a 16-game schedule since 2002.

=== Playoffs ===
- May 11, 2013: Despite having earned the right to host the Championship game, the Washington Stealth were forced to play the game in a neutral site arena because of schedule conflicts with Comcast Arena. The game was played at the Langley Events Centre in Langley, British Columbia.

== Awards ==
Award	Winner	Team
Most Valuable Player	Shawn Evans	Calgary Roughnecks
Goaltender of the Year	Matt Vinc	Rochester Knighthawks
Defensive Player of the Year	Kyle Rubisch	Edmonton Rush
Transition Player of the Year	Jordan MacIntosh	Minnesota Swarm
Rookie of the Year	Mark Matthews	Edmonton Rush
Sportsmanship Award	Garrett Billings	Toronto Rock
GM of the Year	Doug Locker	Washington Stealth
Les Bartley Award	Troy Cordingley	Toronto Rock
Executive of the Year Award	Jamie Dawick	Toronto Rock
Tom Borrelli Award	Stephen Stamp	ILIndoor.com

=== All-Rookie team ===
- Joey Cupido, Colorado
- Shayne Jackson, Minnesota
- Curtis Knight, Edmonton
- Mark Matthews, Edmonton
- Kiel Matisz, Minnesota
- Joe Resetarits, Calgary
- Dhane Smith, Buffalo

=== All-Pro teams ===
First team

- Garrett Billings, Toronto
- Rhys Duch, Washington
- Shawn Evans, Calgary
- Jordan MacIntosh, Minnesota
- Kyle Rubisch, Edmonton
- Matt Vinc, Rochester

Second team

- Callum Crawford, Minnesota
- Curtis Dickson, Calgary
- John Grant, Jr., Colorado
- Jesse Gamble, Toronto
- Mike Grimes, Washington
- Brandon Miller, Philadelphia

=== Weekly awards ===
The NLL gives out awards weekly for the best offensive player, best transition player, best defensive player, and best rookie.

Month	Week	Offensive	Defensive	Transition	Rookie
January	1	Cliff Smith	Matt Vinc	Mitch McMichael	Kyle Buchanan
January	2	Cliff Smith	Nick Rose	Brodie Merrill	Curtis Knight
January	3	John Grant, Jr.	Brandon Miller	Brodie Merrill	Mark Matthews
January	4	Shawn Evans	Mike Poulin	Geoff Snider	Kiel Matisz
February	5	John Grant, Jr.	Matt Vinc	Geoff Snider	Shayne Jackson
February	6	Cody Jamieson	Tyler Richards	Tyler Hass	Mitch McMichael
February	7	Mark Matthews	Anthony Cosmo	Jeremy Thompson	Kiel Matisz
February	8	Rhys Duch	Brandon Miller	Jordan MacIntosh	Kiel Matisz
March	9	Ryan Ward	Kyle Rubisch	Jay Thorimbert	Mark Matthews
March	10	Dane Dobbie	Tyler Richards	Jesse Gamble	Tye Belanger
March	11	Callum Crawford	Tyler Carlson	Jordan MacIntosh	Kyle Belton
March	12	Corey Small	Aaron Bold	Alex Kedoh Hill	Curtis Knight
March	13	Callum Crawford	Matt Vinc	Jordan MacIntosh	Kiel Matisz
April	14	Callum Crawford	Tye Belanger	Jordan MacIntosh	Shayne Jackson
April	15	Dan Dawson	Brandon Miller	Jordan MacIntosh	Jordan Critch
April	16	Shawn Evans	Mike Grimes	Jordan MacIntosh	Dhane Smith

=== Monthly awards ===
Awards are also given out monthly for the best overall player and best rookie.

Month	Overall	Rookie
January	Shawn Evans	Mark Matthews
February	Garrett Billings	Mark Matthews
March	Colin Doyle	Mark Matthews
April	Callum Crawford	Kiel Matisz

== Attendance ==
=== Regular season ===
Home team	Home games	Average attendance	Total attendance
Buffalo Bandits	8	15,620	124,960
Colorado Mammoth	8	13,731	109,853
Toronto Rock	8	10,729	85,835
Calgary Roughnecks	8	10,215	81,724
Minnesota Swarm	8	8,741	69,930
Philadelphia Wings	8	7,647	61,178
Rochester Knighthawks	8	7,353	58,829
Edmonton Rush	8	6,713	53,708
Washington Stealth	8	4,184	33,475
League	72	9,437	679,492

=== Playoffs ===
Home team	Home games	Average attendance	Total attendance
Calgary Roughnecks	2	9,154	18,309
Toronto Rock	1	9,066	9,066
Rochester Knighthawks	2	5,528	11,056
Washington Stealth	2	4,111	8,222
League	7	6,664	46,653

== See also ==
- 2013 in sports
