= 2013 Toronto Rock season =

2013 Toronto Rock
- League: NLL
- Division: 1st East
- 2013 record: 10 – 6
- Home record: 5 – 3
- Road record: 5 – 3
- Goals for: 194
- Goals against: 176
- General Manager: Terry Sanderson
- Coach: Troy Cordingley
- Captain: Colin Doyle
- Alternate captains: Sandy Chapman; Blaine Manning; Josh Sanderson; Cam Woods
- Arena: Air Canada Centre

Team leaders
- Goals: Kasey Beirnes (31)
- Assists: Garrett Billings (70)
- Points: Garrett Billings (100)
- Penalties in minutes: Damon Edwards (32)
- Loose Balls: Jesse Gamble (108)
- Wins: Nick Rose (10)
- Goals against average: Nick Rose (10.61)

The Toronto Rock are a lacrosse team based in Toronto playing in the National Lacrosse League (NLL). The 2013 season was the 16th in franchise history, and 15th as the Rock.

After a strong 5-1 start to the season, the Rock went 5-5 the rest of the way, but it was still enough to clinch first place overall. In the division semi-finals, the Rock faced the western division's Minnesota Swarm who, because their record was better than that of the Buffalo Bandits, crossed over into the East division. The Swarm ended the Rock's season by defeating them 20-11 at the Air Canada Centre to advance to the Eastern final.

== Regular season ==
=== Final standings ===
East Division
P	Team	GP	W	L	PCT	GB	Home	Road	GF	GA	Diff	GF/GP	GA/GP
1	Toronto Rock – xyz	16	10	6	.625	0.0	5–3	5–3	194	176	+18	12.12	11.00
2	Rochester Knighthawks – x	16	8	8	.500	2.0	3–5	5–3	179	165	+14	11.19	10.31
3	Philadelphia Wings – x	16	7	9	.438	3.0	4–4	3–5	170	207	−37	10.62	12.94
4	Buffalo Bandits	16	6	10	.375	4.0	2–6	4–4	171	211	−40	10.69	13.19

West Division
P	Team	GP	W	L	PCT	GB	Home	Road	GF	GA	Diff	GF/GP	GA/GP
1	Calgary Roughnecks – xy	16	9	7	.562	0.0	3–5	6–2	222	211	+11	13.88	13.19
2	Washington Stealth – x	16	9	7	.562	0.0	5–3	4–4	193	192	+1	12.06	12.00
3	Edmonton Rush – x	16	9	7	.562	0.0	2–6	7–1	203	170	+33	12.69	10.62
4	Colorado Mammoth – x	16	7	9	.438	2.0	3–5	4–4	185	202	−17	11.56	12.62
5	Minnesota Swarm – c	16	7	9	.438	2.0	5–3	2–6	219	202	+17	13.69	12.62

x: Clinched playoff berth; c: Clinched playoff berth by crossing over to another division; y: Clinched division; z: Clinched best regular season record; GP: Games Played
W: Wins; L: Losses; GB: Games back; PCT: Win percentage; Home: Record at Home; Road: Record on the Road; GF: Goals scored; GA: Goals allowed
Differential: Difference between goals scored and allowed; GF/GP: Average number of goals scored per game; GA/GP: Average number of goals allowed per game

=== Game log ===
Game	Date	Opponent	Location	Score	OT	Attendance	Record
1	January 12, 2013	@ Calgary Roughnecks	Scotiabank Saddledome	W 13–11		11,653	1–0
2	January 13, 2013	@ Edmonton Rush	Rexall Place	W 10–9		6,523	2–0
3	January 19, 2013	Philadelphia Wings	Air Canada Centre	L 7–8		11,703	2–1
4	January 25, 2013	Minnesota Swarm	Air Canada Centre	W 13–12		10,504	3–1
5	January 26, 2013	@ Rochester Knighthawks	Blue Cross Arena	W 11–7		5,762	4–1
6	February 1, 2013	@ Buffalo Bandits	First Niagara Center	W 14–12		14,918	5–1
7	February 8, 2013	@ Minnesota Swarm	Xcel Energy Center	L 12–13	OT	7,722	5–2
8	February 15, 2013	Calgary Roughnecks	Air Canada Centre	W 17–12		10,026	6–2
9	February 28, 2013	Buffalo Bandits	Air Canada Centre	L 13–15		8,213	6–3
10	March 8, 2013	Colorado Mammoth	Air Canada Centre	W 14–10		10,823	7–3
11	March 16, 2013	@ Philadelphia Wings	Wells Fargo Center	W 13–8		7,593	8–3
12	March 24, 2013	Edmonton Rush	Air Canada Centre	L 12–17		9,947	8–4
13	March 29, 2013	Buffalo Bandits	Air Canada Centre	W 18–11		11,546	9–4
14	March 30, 2013	@ Rochester Knighthawks	Blue Cross Arena	L 8–12		7,013	9–5
15	April 7, 2013	Rochester Knighthawks	Air Canada Centre	W 10–9		13,073	10–5
16	April 13, 2013	@ Philadelphia Wings	Wells Fargo Center	L 9–10	OT	7,437	10–6

== Playoffs ==
=== Game log ===
Game	Date	Opponent	Location	Score	OT	Attendance	Record
Division Semifinal	April 28, 2013	Minnesota Swarm	Air Canada Centre	L 11–20		9,066	0–1

== Roster ==
2013 Toronto Rock roster
Active (21-man) roster		Inactive roster	Coaches
Goaltenders: 35 (Canada) Zak Boychuk; 66 (Canada) Nick Rose; Defensemen: 5 (Canada) Sandy Chapman (A); 45 (Canada) Damon Edwards; 21 (Canada) Bill Greer; 44 (Canada) Stephen Hoar; 11 (Canada) Mike Hobbins; 88 (Canada) Scott Johnston; 14 (Canada) Rob Marshall; 9 (Canada) Patrick Merrill; 12 (Canada) Chris White; 22 (Canada) Cam Woods (A)	Forwards: 33 (Canada) Kasey Beirnes; 87 (Canada) Kyle Belton; 13 (Canada) Garrett Billings; 7 (Canada) Colin Doyle (C); 15 (Canada) Scott Evans; 10 (Canada) Rob Hellyer; 17 (Canada) Stephan Leblanc; 16 (Canada) Blaine Manning (A); 19 (Canada) Josh Sanderson (A); 81 (Canada) Roger Vyse; Transition: 4 (Canada) Jesse Gamble	Practice squad: 15 (Canada) Brandon Ivey; 93 (Canada) Bradley Kri; 24 (Canada) Brenden Thenhaus; Injured reserve: 41 (Canada) Mike Lum-Walker; Unable to play: 52 (Canada) Tyler Glebe	Head coach {{{Head Coach}}} Legend: * Suspended list; (C) Captain; (A) Alternate captain; Roster updated 2013-03-18; NLL Transactions

== Transactions ==
=== Trades ===
July 26, 2012	To Calgary Roughnecks Aaron Pascas	To Toronto Rock Third round selection, 2012 Entry Draft
August 4, 2012	To Buffalo Bandits; Glen Bryan; Jamie Rooney	To Toronto Rock 14th overall selection, 2012 Entry Draft; Fourth round selection, 2014 Entry Draft
March 14, 2013	To Buffalo Bandits; Rights to Steve Dietrich	To Toronto Rock Sixth round selection, 2015 Entry Draft

=== Entry Draft ===
The 2012 NLL Entry Draft took place on October 1, 2012. The Rock made the following selections:

Round	Overall	Player	College/Club
2	14	Bradley Kri	Orangeville, Ontario
2	20	Mike Lum-Walker	Whitby, Ontario
3	25	Kyle Pereira	Brampton, Ontario
3	27	Kyle Belton	Stony Brook University
4	34	Dustin Caravello	Orangeville, Ontario
5	43	Robert Koger	Georgetown University
6	52	Tyler Glebe	London, Ontario

== See also ==
- 2013 NLL season
