= 2013 Edmonton Rush season =

2013 Edmonton Rush
- League: NLL
- Division: 3rd West
- 2013 record: 9 – 7
- Home record: 2 – 6
- Road record: 7 – 1
- Goals for: 203
- Goals against: 170
- General Manager: Derek Keenan
- Coach: Derek Keenan
- Captain: Jimmy Quinlan
- Alternate captains: Brett Mydske; Chris Corbeil; Ryan Ward; Kyle Rubisch
- Arena: Rexall Place

Team leaders
- Goals: Mark Matthews (38)
- Assists: Ryan Ward (54)
- Points: Ryan Ward (75)
- Penalties in minutes: Kyle Rubisch (38)
- Loose Balls: Jeremy Thompson (131)
- Wins: Aaron Bold (8)
- Goals against average: Aaron Bold (10.56)

The Edmonton Rush are a lacrosse team based in Edmonton playing in the National Lacrosse League (NLL). The 2013 season was the 8th in franchise history.

After making the Championship game in 2012, the Rush started the 2013 season with only a single win in their first five games. They won 7 of their next 8 games to improve to 8-5, tied for first in the division. Losses to division rivals Colorado and Calgary dropped the Rush to 3rd place and they faced the second place Washington Stealth in the first round of the playoffs.

But the Stealth ended any thoughts the Rush had of returning to the Championship game, winning 12-11 in the division semi-finals.

== Regular season ==
=== Conference standings ===
East Division
P	Team	GP	W	L	PCT	GB	Home	Road	GF	GA	Diff	GF/GP	GA/GP
1	Toronto Rock – xyz	16	10	6	.625	0.0	5–3	5–3	194	176	+18	12.12	11.00
2	Rochester Knighthawks – x	16	8	8	.500	2.0	3–5	5–3	179	165	+14	11.19	10.31
3	Philadelphia Wings – x	16	7	9	.438	3.0	4–4	3–5	170	207	−37	10.62	12.94
4	Buffalo Bandits	16	6	10	.375	4.0	2–6	4–4	171	211	−40	10.69	13.19

West Division
P	Team	GP	W	L	PCT	GB	Home	Road	GF	GA	Diff	GF/GP	GA/GP
1	Calgary Roughnecks – xy	16	9	7	.562	0.0	3–5	6–2	222	211	+11	13.88	13.19
2	Washington Stealth – x	16	9	7	.562	0.0	5–3	4–4	193	192	+1	12.06	12.00
3	Edmonton Rush – x	16	9	7	.562	0.0	2–6	7–1	203	170	+33	12.69	10.62
4	Colorado Mammoth – x	16	7	9	.438	2.0	3–5	4–4	185	202	−17	11.56	12.62
5	Minnesota Swarm – c	16	7	9	.438	2.0	5–3	2–6	219	202	+17	13.69	12.62

x: Clinched playoff berth; c: Clinched playoff berth by crossing over to another division; y: Clinched division; z: Clinched best regular season record; GP: Games Played
W: Wins; L: Losses; GB: Games back; PCT: Win percentage; Home: Record at Home; Road: Record on the Road; GF: Goals scored; GA: Goals allowed
Differential: Difference between goals scored and allowed; GF/GP: Average number of goals scored per game; GA/GP: Average number of goals allowed per game

== Game log ==
Game	Date	Opponent	Location	Score	OT	Attendance	Record
1	January 13, 2013	Toronto Rock	Rexall Place	L 9–10		6,523	0–1
2	January 20, 2013	@ Washington Stealth	Comcast Arena	W 18–10		3,766	1–1
3	January 25, 2013	Washington Stealth	Rexall Place	L 10–12		5,416	1–2
4	February 2, 2013	Calgary Roughnecks	Rexall Place	L 15–18		7,349	1–3
5	February 9, 2013	@ Calgary Roughnecks	Scotiabank Saddledome	L 8–9		10,002	1–4
6	February 15, 2013	Washington Stealth	Rexall Place	W 15–10		5,627	2–4
7	February 16, 2013	@ Colorado Mammoth	Pepsi Center	W 14–7		17,059	3–4
8	February 22, 2013	Minnesota Swarm	Rexall Place	L 8–13		6,292	3–5
9	February 24, 2013	@ Minnesota Swarm	Xcel Energy Center	W 14–9		6,882	4–5
10	March 2, 2013	@ Calgary Roughnecks	Scotiabank Saddledome	W 18–13		11,385	5–5
11	March 16, 2013	@ Rochester Knighthawks	Blue Cross Arena	W 11–9		7,009	6–5
12	March 23, 2013	@ Buffalo Bandits	First Niagara Center	W 14–7		16,629	7–5
13	March 24, 2013	@ Toronto Rock	Air Canada Centre	W 17–12		9,947	8–5
14	April 6, 2013	Colorado Mammoth	Rexall Place	L 7–9		7,172	8–6
15	April 14, 2013	Rochester Knighthawks	Rexall Place	W 14–10		6,116	9–6
16	April 20, 2013	Calgary Roughnecks	Rexall Place	L 11–12		9,213	9–7

== Playoffs ==
=== Game log ===
Game	Date	Opponent	Location	Score	OT	Attendance	Record
1	April 27, 2013	@ Washington Stealth	Comcast Arena	L 11–12		3,022	0–1

== Transactions ==
=== Trades ===
July 27, 2012	To Edmonton Rush 2nd round pick in 2013 Entry Draft - Riley Loewen (F); 2nd round pick in 2013 Entry Draft - Adrian Sorichetti (T)	To Minnesota Swarm Shawn Williams (F)
July 27, 2012	To Edmonton Rush Jarrett Davis (F)	To Rochester Knighthawks Paul Rabil (F)
October 1, 2012	To Edmonton Rush 4th round pick in 2012 Entry Draft - Simon Giourmetakis (F); 4th round pick in 2012 Entry Draft - Mitchell Bannister (T)	To Minnesota Swarm 4th round pick in 2012 Entry Draft - Tyler Tanguay (T); 5th round pick in 2012 Entry Draft - Matt Gibson (F); 3rd round pick in 2013 Entry Draft - Zach Palmer (F)
November 14, 2012	To Edmonton Rush Jeremy Thompson (T)	To Buffalo Bandits Aaron Wilson (F); 2nd round pick in 2013 Entry Draft - Nick Diachenko (D)
November 15, 2012	To Edmonton Rush Cory Conway (F); *6th round pick in 2013 Entry Draft - Nicholas Jonas (D)	To Calgary Roughnecks **3rd round pick in 2014 Entry Draft - Ty Thompson (F)

*Later traded to the Minnesota Swarm
**Later traded to the New England Black Wolves

=== Entry Draft ===
The 2012 NLL Entry Draft took place on October 1, 2012. The Rush made the following selections:

^{x} Denotes player who won at least one NLL Award
^{#} Denotes player who never played in the NLL regular season or playoffs

Round	Overall	Player	College/Club
1	1	Mark Matthews^{x} (F)	University of Denver
1	8	Curtis Knight (F)	Whitby, Ontario
2	15	Michael Cudmore (D)	University of Hartford
3	28	Michael Burke (F)	Brampton, Ontario
4	33	Simon Giourmetakis^{#} (F)	Canisius College
4	35	Mitchell Banister (T)	Okotoks, Alberta
6	55	Kyle Goodchild^{#} (D)	University of Hartford

== Roster ==
2013 Edmonton Rush roster
Active (21-man) roster		Inactive roster	Coaches
Goaltenders: 77 (Canada) Aaron Bold; 50 (Canada) Brodie MacDonald; Defensemen: 16 (Canada) Chris Corbeil (A); 13 (Canada) Jeff Cornwall; 89 (Canada) Mike Cudmore; 24 (Canada) Ryan Dilks; 6 (Canada) John Lintz; 2 (Canada) Brett Mydske (A); 4 (Canada) Kyle Rubisch (A); 3 (Canada) Jarrett Toll	Forwards: 20 (Canada) Mitch Bannister; 61 (Canada) Mike Burke; 91 (Canada) Cory Conway; 23 (Canada) Jarrett Davis; 88 (Canada) Zack Greer; 9 (Canada) Curtis Knight; 42 (Canada) Mark Matthews; 15 (Canada) Corey Small; 87 (Canada) Alex Turner; 44 (Canada) Ryan Ward (A); Transition: 33 (Canada) John LaFontaine; 81 (Canada) Jimmy Quinlan (C); 74 (Iroquois) Jeremy Thompson	Practice squad: 18 (Canada) Jesse Fehr; 27 (Canada) Simon Giourmetakis; 31 (Canada) David Marrese; Holdout: 71 (Canada) Tyler Codron; -- (Canada) Eric Lewthwaite; Protected list: -- (Canada) Dane Stevens; -- (Canada) Andrew Turner; Unable to play: -- (Canada) Buck Stobart	Head coach {{{Head Coach}}} Legend: * Suspended list; (C) Captain; (A) Alternate captain; Roster updated 2012-01-08; NLL Transactions

== See also ==
- 2013 NLL season
