= 2013 Buffalo Bandits season =

2013 Buffalo Bandits
- League: NLL
- Division: 4th East
- 2013 record: 6–10
- Home record: 2–6
- Road record: 4–4
- Goals for: 171
- Goals against: 211
- General Manager: Steve Dietrich
- Coach: Darris Kilgour
- Captain: John Tavares
- Alternate captains: Scott Self; Shawn Williams
- Arena: First Niagara Center

Team leaders
- Goals: Dhane Smith (24)
- Assists: Shawn Williams (46)
- Points: Shawn Williams (65)
- Penalties in minutes: David Brock (46); Steve Priolo (46)
- Loose Balls: Jay Thorimbert (180)
- Wins: Anthony Cosmo (4)
- Goals against average: Kurtis Wagar (12.22)

The Buffalo Bandits are a lacrosse team based in Buffalo, New York playing in the National Lacrosse League (NLL). The 2013 season was their 22nd season in the NLL.

The Bandits started the season with a fairly strong 5–3 record, with wins over their division rivals the Toronto Rock and Philadelphia Wings and two wins over the defending champion Rochester Knighthawks. But for the second straight season, the Bandits lost six straight games to put their playoff hopes in jeopardy. They finished the season with a 6–10 record, and out of the playoffs for the first time since 2002.

After the season, long-time coach Darris Kilgour was fired by the Bandits. Despite the low season, the Bandits drafted Dhane Smith with the fifth overall pick in the NLL draft.

As of 2026, this is the Bandits' lowest win total in franchise history since the league expanded to at least 16 games.

== Standings ==
East Division
P	Team	GP	W	L	PCT	GB	Home	Road	GF	GA	Diff	GF/GP	GA/GP
1	Toronto Rock – xyz	16	10	6	.625	0.0	5–3	5–3	194	176	+18	12.12	11.00
2	Rochester Knighthawks – x	16	8	8	.500	2.0	3–5	5–3	179	165	+14	11.19	10.31
3	Philadelphia Wings – x	16	7	9	.438	3.0	4–4	3–5	170	207	−37	10.62	12.94
4	Buffalo Bandits	16	6	10	.375	4.0	2–6	4–4	171	211	−40	10.69	13.19

West Division
P	Team	GP	W	L	PCT	GB	Home	Road	GF	GA	Diff	GF/GP	GA/GP
1	Calgary Roughnecks – xy	16	9	7	.562	0.0	3–5	6–2	222	211	+11	13.88	13.19
2	Washington Stealth – x	16	9	7	.562	0.0	5–3	4–4	193	192	+1	12.06	12.00
3	Edmonton Rush – x	16	9	7	.562	0.0	2–6	7–1	203	170	+33	12.69	10.62
4	Colorado Mammoth – x	16	7	9	.438	2.0	3–5	4–4	185	202	−17	11.56	12.62
5	Minnesota Swarm – c	16	7	9	.438	2.0	5–3	2–6	219	202	+17	13.69	12.62

x: Clinched playoff berth; c: Clinched playoff berth by crossing over to another division; y: Clinched division; z: Clinched best regular season record; GP: Games Played
W: Wins; L: Losses; GB: Games back; PCT: Win percentage; Home: Record at Home; Road: Record on the Road; GF: Goals scored; GA: Goals allowed
Differential: Difference between goals scored and allowed; GF/GP: Average number of goals scored per game; GA/GP: Average number of goals allowed per game

=== Game log ===
Game	Date	Opponent	Location	Score	OT	Attendance	Record
1	January 11, 2013	@ Philadelphia Wings	Wells Fargo Center	L 8–13		9,096	0–1
2	January 12, 2013	Minnesota Swarm	First Niagara Center	W 13–12		15,238	1–1
3	January 19, 2013	@ Rochester Knighthawks	Blue Cross Arena	W 14–13		7,834	2–1
4	January 26, 2013	Philadelphia Wings	First Niagara Center	W 14–13		13,808	3–1
5	February 2, 2013	Toronto Rock	First Niagara Center	L 12–14		14,918	3–2
6	February 9, 2013	Rochester Knighthawks	First Niagara Center	L 7–15		14,833	3–3
7	February 16, 2013	@ Rochester Knighthawks	Blue Cross Arena	W 10–6		9,156	4–3
8	February 28, 2013	@ Toronto Rock	Air Canada Centre	W 15–13		8,213	5–3
9	March 1, 2013	Philadelphia Wings	First Niagara Center	L 10–11	OT	14,036	5–4
10	March 9, 2013	Colorado Mammoth	First Niagara Center	L 6–12		16,428	5–5
11	March 16, 2013	@ Colorado Mammoth	Pepsi Center	L 13–16		15,511	5–6
12	March 23, 2013	Edmonton Rush	First Niagara Center	L 7–14		16,629	5–7
13	March 29, 2013	@ Toronto Rock	Air Canada Centre	L 11–18		11,546	5–8
14	April 6, 2013	@ Minnesota Swarm	Xcel Energy Center	L 7–21		10,167	5–9
15	April 13, 2013	@ Washington Stealth	Comcast Arena	W 15–10		3,442	6–9
16	April 20, 2013	Rochester Knighthawks	First Niagara Center	L 9–10		19,070	6–10

== Roster ==
2013 Buffalo Bandits roster
Active (21-man) roster		Inactive roster	Coaches
Goaltenders: 44 (Canada) Anthony Cosmo; 38 (Canada) Kurtis Wagar; Defensemen: 18 (Canada) Glen Bryan; 14 (Canada) Mike McNamara; 23 (Canada) Steve Priolo; 3 (Canada) Billy Dee Smith; 6 (Canada) Derek Suddons	Forwards: 89 (Canada) Carter Bender; 37 (Canada) Nick Cotter; 19 (Canada) Chad Culp; 28 (Canada) Mike Hominuck; 20 (Canada) Derek Hopcroft; 66 (Haudenosaunee) Alex Kedoh Hill; 90 (Canada) Jamie Rooney; 92 (Canada) Dhane Smith; 11 (Canada) John Tavares (C); 51 (Canada) Shawn Williams (A); 15 (Canada) Luke Wiles; 10 (Canada) Aaron Wilson; Transition: 13 (Canada) David Brock; 7 (Canada) Jon Harasym; 9 (Canada) Mark Steenhuis; 75 (Canada) Jay Thorimbert	Practice squad: 8 (Canada) Kevin Brownell; 77 (Canada) Craig England; 97 (Canada) Hayden Smith; Injured reserve: 91 (Canada) Jordan Critch; 17 (Canada) Tracey Kelusky; Holdout: 14 (Canada) Joe Smith; 93 (Canada) Scott Stewart; Unable to play: 40 (Canada) Joel Matthews	Head coach {{{Head Coach}}} Legend: * Suspended list; (C) Captain; (A) Alternate captain; Roster updated 2013-3-16; NLL Transactions

== Player stats ==
=== Runners (Top 10) ===
Player	GP	G	A	Pts	LB	PIM
Shawn Williams	16	19	46	65	42	6
Aaron Wilson	16	23	23	46	53	4
Dhane Smith	15	24	20	44	42	4
John Tavares	12	14	25	39	38	6
Mark Steenhuis	16	13	26	39	71	29
Mike Hominuck	12	14	7	21	48	6
Luke Wiles	12	10	11	21	30	10
Chad Culp	11	7	14	21	54	11
David Brock	15	6	7	13	55	46
Jay Thorimbert	16	2	10	12	180	4
Totals		171	251	422	1,069	328

=== Goaltenders ===
Player	GP	MIN	W	L	GA	Sv%	GAA
Anthony Cosmo	16	628:21	4	4	140	.751	13.37
Kurtis Wagar	15	333:51	2	6	68	.713	12.22
Scott Komer	1	0:00	0	0	0	N/A	N/A
Totals		962:12	6	10	208	.740	12.97

== Transactions ==
=== Trades ===
July 27, 2012	To Buffalo Bandits Shawn Williams; Brendan Doran; 5th, 14th, and 18th overall selections, 2012 entry draft	To Minnesota Swarm 3rd overall selection, 2012 entry draft
August 4, 2012	To Buffalo Bandits Glen Bryan; Jamie Rooney	To Toronto Rock 14th overall selection, 2012 Entry Draft; Fourth round selection, 2014 Entry Draft
August 13, 2012	To Buffalo Bandits David Brock; Mike Hominuck	To Philadelphia Wings Kevin Buchanan; Third round selection, 2013 Entry Draft
November 14, 2012	To Buffalo Bandits Aaron Wilson; 2nd round pick in 2013 Entry Draft	To Edmonton Rush Jeremy Thompson
December 5, 2012	To Buffalo Bandits Derek Hopcroft	To Colorado Mammoth Conditional 5th round pick, 2014 entry draft

=== Entry Draft ===
The 2012 NLL Entry Draft took place on October 1, 2012. The Bandits made the following selections:

Round	Overall	Player	College/Club
1	5	Dhane Smith	Kitchener, Ontario
2	13	Hayden Smith	Orangeville, Ontario
2	16	Jordan Critch	Orangeville, Ontario
2	18	Carter Bender	University of Hartford
3	22	Kevin Brownell	Robert Morris University
4	31	Joel Matthews	University of Detroit Mercy
5	50	Wenster Green	Six Nations, Ontario

== See also ==
- 2013 NLL season
