= 2013 Calgary Roughnecks season =

2013 Calgary Roughnecks
- League: NLL
- Division: 1st West
- 2013 record: 9 – 7
- Home record: 3 – 5
- Road record: 6 – 2
- Goals for: 222
- Goals against: 211
- General Manager: Mike Board
- Coach: Curt Malawsky
- Captain: Andrew McBride
- Arena: Scotiabank Saddledome

Team leaders
- Goals: Curtis Dickson (42)
- Assists: Shawn Evans (80)
- Points: Shawn Evans (112)
- Penalties in minutes: Geoff Snider (69)
- Loose Balls: Geoff Snider (235)
- Wins: Mike Poulin (9)
- Goals against average: Mike Poulin (12.70)

The Calgary Roughnecks are a lacrosse team based in Calgary playing in the National Lacrosse League (NLL). The 2013 season was the 12th in franchise history.

For the third straight season, the Roughnecks finished the season first in the west, but ran into trouble in the playoffs. Calgary defeated the Colorado Mammoth 15-10 in the division semi-finals but in a thrilling division final game, the Washington Stealth held on to win 14-13 and end the Roughnecks season.

== Regular season ==
=== Conference standings ===
East Division
| P | Team | GP | W | L | PCT | GB | Home | Road | GF | GA | Diff | GF/GP | GA/GP |
|---|---|---|---|---|---|---|---|---|---|---|---|---|---|
| 1 | Toronto Rock – xyz | 16 | 10 | 6 | .625 | 0.0 | 5–3 | 5–3 | 194 | 176 | +18 | 12.12 | 11.00 |
| 2 | Rochester Knighthawks – x | 16 | 8 | 8 | .500 | 2.0 | 3–5 | 5–3 | 179 | 165 | +14 | 11.19 | 10.31 |
| 3 | Philadelphia Wings – x | 16 | 7 | 9 | .438 | 3.0 | 4–4 | 3–5 | 170 | 207 | −37 | 10.62 | 12.94 |
| 4 | Buffalo Bandits | 16 | 6 | 10 | .375 | 4.0 | 2–6 | 4–4 | 171 | 211 | −40 | 10.69 | 13.19 |

West Division
| P | Team | GP | W | L | PCT | GB | Home | Road | GF | GA | Diff | GF/GP | GA/GP |
|---|---|---|---|---|---|---|---|---|---|---|---|---|---|
| 1 | Calgary Roughnecks – xy | 16 | 9 | 7 | .562 | 0.0 | 3–5 | 6–2 | 222 | 211 | +11 | 13.88 | 13.19 |
| 2 | Washington Stealth – x | 16 | 9 | 7 | .562 | 0.0 | 5–3 | 4–4 | 193 | 192 | +1 | 12.06 | 12.00 |
| 3 | Edmonton Rush – x | 16 | 9 | 7 | .562 | 0.0 | 2–6 | 7–1 | 203 | 170 | +33 | 12.69 | 10.62 |
| 4 | Colorado Mammoth – x | 16 | 7 | 9 | .438 | 2.0 | 3–5 | 4–4 | 185 | 202 | −17 | 11.56 | 12.62 |
| 5 | Minnesota Swarm – c | 16 | 7 | 9 | .438 | 2.0 | 5–3 | 2–6 | 219 | 202 | +17 | 13.69 | 12.62 |

x: Clinched playoff berth; c: Clinched playoff berth by crossing over to another division; y: Clinched division; z: Clinched best regular season record; GP: Games Played
W: Wins; L: Losses; GB: Games back; PCT: Win percentage; Home: Record at Home; Road: Record on the Road; GF: Goals scored; GA: Goals allowed
Differential: Difference between goals scored and allowed; GF/GP: Average number of goals scored per game; GA/GP: Average number of goals allowed per game

=== Game log ===
| Game | Date | Opponent | Location | Score | OT | Attendance | Record |
|---|---|---|---|---|---|---|---|
| 1 | January 12, 2013 | Toronto Rock | Scotiabank Saddledome | L 11–13 | | 11,653 | 0–1 |
| 2 | January 19, 2013 | Colorado Mammoth | Scotiabank Saddledome | L 12–13 | OT | 8,221 | 0–2 |
| 3 | January 25, 2013 | @ Colorado Mammoth | Pepsi Center | W 19–12 | | 15,103 | 1–2 |
| 4 | January 27, 2013 | @ Philadelphia Wings | Wells Fargo Center | W 16–8 | | 8,785 | 2–2 |
| 5 | February 2, 2013 | @ Edmonton Rush | Rexall Place | W 18–15 | | 7,349 | 3–2 |
| 6 | February 9, 2013 | Edmonton Rush | Scotiabank Saddledome | W 9–8 | | 10,002 | 4–2 |
| 7 | February 15, 2013 | @ Toronto Rock | Air Canada Centre | L 12–17 | | 10,026 | 4–3 |
| 8 | February 16, 2013 | @ Minnesota Swarm | Xcel Energy Center | W 17–16 | | 8,254 | 5–3 |
| 9 | February 23, 2013 | @ Washington Stealth | Comcast Arena | L 14–16 | | 3,819 | 5–4 |
| 10 | March 2, 2013 | Edmonton Rush | Scotiabank Saddledome | L 13–18 | | 11,385 | 5–5 |
| 11 | March 8, 2013 | Minnesota Swarm | Scotiabank Saddledome | W 19–15 | | 8,622 | 6–5 |
| 12 | March 23, 2013 | Colorado Mammoth | Scotiabank Saddledome | W 12–11 | OT | 9,493 | 7–5 |
| 13 | March 30, 2013 | @ Washington Stealth | Comcast Arena | W 13–11 | | 4,727 | 8–5 |
| 14 | April 6, 2013 | Washington Stealth | Scotiabank Saddledome | L 11–12 | | 10,008 | 8–6 |
| 15 | April 13, 2013 | Rochester Knighthawks | Scotiabank Saddledome | L 14–15 | | 12,340 | 8–7 |
| 16 | April 20, 2013 | @ Edmonton Rush | Rexall Place | W 12–11 | | 9,213 | 9–7 |

=== Game log ===
| Game | Date | Opponent | Location | Score | OT | Attendance | Record |
|---|---|---|---|---|---|---|---|
| Division Semifinal | April 27, 2013 | Colorado Mammoth | Scotiabank Saddledome | W 15–10 | | 8,726 | 1–0 |
| Division Final | May 4, 2013 | Washington Stealth | Scotiabank Saddledome | L 12–13 | | 9,583 | 1–1 |

== Roster ==
2013 Calgary Roughnecks roster
| Active (21-man) roster | | Inactive roster | Coaches |
|---|---|---|---|
| Goaltenders: 30 (Canada) Mike Poulin; 92 (Canada) Frankie Scigliano; Defensemen: 16 (Canada) Mike Carnegie (A); 22 (Canada) Scott Carnegie; 11 (Canada) Greg Harnett; 33 (Canada) Jon Harnett; 3 (Canada) Dan MacRae; 37 (Canada) Andrew McBride (C) | Forwards: 88 (Canada) Jackson Decker; 17 (Canada) Curtis Dickson; 44 (Canada) Dane Dobbie; 15 (Canada) Shawn Evans; 93 (Canada) Aaron Pascas; 71 (Canada) Scott Ranger; 5 (United States) Joe Resetarits; 77 (Canada) Jeff Shattler; 36 (Canada) Daryl Veltman; Transition: 20 (Canada) Travis Cornwall; 61 (Canada) Matthew Dinsdale; 40 (Canada) Nolan Heavenor; 10 (Canada) Curtis Manning; 80 (Canada) Peter McFetridge; 4 (Canada) Geoff Snider | Practice squad: 23 (Canada) Barclay Hickey; 25 (Canada) Darren Kinnear; 12 (Canada) Andrew Murphy; Injured reserve: -- (Canada) Ryan Haynes; -- (Canada) Sam Kowalyk; Holdout: -- (Canada) Brock Armour; 11 (Canada) Ryan McNish; Unable to play: -- (Canada) Jordan Guindon | Head coach {{{Head Coach}}} Legend: * Suspended list; (C) Captain; (A) Alternate captain; Roster updated 2012-01-09; NLL Transactions |

== Transactions ==
=== Trades ===
| July 26, 2012 | To Toronto Rock Third round selection, 2012 Entry Draft | To Calgary Roughnecks Aaron Pascas |
| November 15, 2012 | To Edmonton Rush Cory Conway; 6th round pick in 2013 Entry Draft | To Calgary Roughnecks 3rd round pick in 2014 Entry Draft |

=== Entry Draft ===
The 2012 NLL Entry Draft took place on October 1, 2012. The Roughnecks made the following selections:

| Round | Overall | Player | College/Club |
|---|---|---|---|
| 1 | 6 | Joe Resetarits | University of Albany |
| 1 | 7 | Matthew Dinsdale | Coquitlam, BC |
| 2 | 17 | Jackson Decker | Burnaby, BC |
| 4 | 36 | Chad Cummings | Kitchener, Ontario |
| 5 | 45 | Kyle Dexter | Calgary, Alberta |
| 6 | 50 | Curtis Pridham | Calgary, Alberta |
| 6 | 54 | Myles Dennett | Calgary, Alberta |

== See also ==
- 2013 NLL season
