= 2013 Washington Stealth season =

2013 Washington Stealth
- West Division Champions
- League: NLL
- Division: 2nd West
- 2013 record: 9 – 7
- Home record: 5 – 3
- Road record: 4 – 4
- Goals for: 193
- Goals against: 192
- General Manager: Doug Locker
- Coach: Chris Hall
- Captain: Kyle Sorensen
- Alternate captains: Rhys Duch; Mike Grimes
- Arena: Comcast Arena

Team leaders
- Goals: Rhys Duch (45)
- Assists: Rhys Duch (51)
- Points: Rhys Duch (96)
- Penalties in minutes: Matt Beers (60)
- Loose Balls: Bob Snider (169)
- Wins: Tyler Richards (8)
- Goals against average: Tyler Richards (10.92)

The Washington Stealth are a lacrosse team based in Everett, Washington. The team plays in the National Lacrosse League (NLL). The 2013 season was the fourth season in Washington, and the 14th in franchise history. It was also the final season the team played in Washington, as they were relocated to Langley, BC for the 2014 season.

After a terrible 2012 season that saw only four wins, the Stealth rebounded in 2013, winning three of their first four games on their way to a 9–7 record. They tied with the Calgary Roughnecks for the best record in the West, but were seeded second due to tiebreakers. In the playoffs, the Stealth defeated the Edmonton Rush and Calgary Roughnecks to advance to the Championship game for the third year in the last four.

The Stealth earned the right to host the Championship game, but the Comcast Arena was booked, so the game was moved to the Langley Events Centre in Langley, British Columbia. The Rochester Knighthawks defeated the Stealth 11–10 to win their second straight Championship.

== Regular season ==
=== Conference standings ===
East Division
P	Team	GP	W	L	PCT	GB	Home	Road	GF	GA	Diff	GF/GP	GA/GP
1	Toronto Rock – xyz	16	10	6	.625	0.0	5–3	5–3	194	176	+18	12.12	11.00
2	Rochester Knighthawks – x	16	8	8	.500	2.0	3–5	5–3	179	165	+14	11.19	10.31
3	Philadelphia Wings – x	16	7	9	.438	3.0	4–4	3–5	170	207	−37	10.62	12.94
4	Buffalo Bandits	16	6	10	.375	4.0	2–6	4–4	171	211	−40	10.69	13.19

West Division
P	Team	GP	W	L	PCT	GB	Home	Road	GF	GA	Diff	GF/GP	GA/GP
1	Calgary Roughnecks – xy	16	9	7	.562	0.0	3–5	6–2	222	211	+11	13.88	13.19
2	Washington Stealth – x	16	9	7	.562	0.0	5–3	4–4	193	192	+1	12.06	12.00
3	Edmonton Rush – x	16	9	7	.562	0.0	2–6	7–1	203	170	+33	12.69	10.62
4	Colorado Mammoth – x	16	7	9	.438	2.0	3–5	4–4	185	202	−17	11.56	12.62
5	Minnesota Swarm – c	16	7	9	.438	2.0	5–3	2–6	219	202	+17	13.69	12.62

x: Clinched playoff berth; c: Clinched playoff berth by crossing over to another division; y: Clinched division; z: Clinched best regular season record; GP: Games Played
W: Wins; L: Losses; GB: Games back; PCT: Win percentage; Home: Record at Home; Road: Record on the Road; GF: Goals scored; GA: Goals allowed
Differential: Difference between goals scored and allowed; GF/GP: Average number of goals scored per game; GA/GP: Average number of goals allowed per game

== Game log ==
Game	Date	Opponent	Location	Score	OT	Attendance	Record
1	January 5, 2013	Rochester Knighthawks	Comcast Arena	W 13–12		7,023	1–0
2	January 12, 2013	@ Colorado Mammoth	Pepsi Center	W 17–13		13,148	2–0
3	January 20, 2013	Edmonton Rush	Comcast Arena	L 10–18		3,766	2–1
4	January 25, 2013	@ Edmonton Rush	Rexall Place	W 12–10		5,416	3–1
5	January 26, 2013	@ Minnesota Swarm	Xcel Energy Center	L 14–15		8,782	3–2
6	February 2, 2013	@ Rochester Knighthawks	Blue Cross Arena	L 6–7		7,914	3–3
7	February 9, 2013	Colorado Mammoth	Comcast Arena	W 13–6		3,683	4–3
8	February 15, 2013	@ Edmonton Rush	Rexall Place	L 10–15		5,627	4–4
9	February 23, 2013	Calgary Roughnecks	Comcast Arena	W 16–14		3,819	5–4
10	March 3, 2013	Minnesota Swarm	Comcast Arena	W 11–8		2,663	6–4
11	March 9, 2013	@ Philadelphia Wings	Wells Fargo Center	W 16–10		7,661	7–4
12	March 16, 2013	@ Minnesota Swarm	Xcel Energy Center	L 5–12		7,830	7–5
13	March 30, 2013	Calgary Roughnecks	Comcast Arena	L 11–13		4,727	7–6
14	April 6, 2013	@ Calgary Roughnecks	Scotiabank Saddledome	W 12–11		10,008	8–6
15	April 13, 2013	Buffalo Bandits	Comcast Arena	L 10–15		3,442	8–7
16	April 20, 2013	Philadelphia Wings	Comcast Arena	W 17–13		4,352	9–7

== Playoffs ==
=== Game log ===
Game	Date	Opponent	Location	Score	OT	Attendance	Record
Division Semifinal	April 27, 2013	Edmonton Rush	Comcast Arena	W 12–11		3,022	1–0
Division Final	May 4, 2013	@ Calgary Roughnecks	Scotiabank Saddledome	W 13–12		9,583	2–0
Final	May 11, 2013	Rochester Knighthawks	Comcast Arena	L 10–11		5,200	2–1

== Roster ==
2013 Washington Stealth roster
Active (21-man) roster		Inactive roster	Coaches
Goaltenders: 00 (Canada) Tyler Richards; 33 (Canada) Matt Roik; Defensemen: 2 (Canada) Matt Beers; 91 (Canada) Tyler Garrison; 23 (Canada) Mike Grimes (A); 21 (United States) Tim Henderson; 6 (Canada) Curtis Hodgson; 28 (Canada) Bill Hostrawser; 44 (Canada) Chris McElroy; 3 (Canada) Jeff Moleski; 24 (United States) Chris O'Dougherty; 20 (Canada) Justin Pychel; 19 (Canada) Justin Salt; 11 (Canada) Kyle Sorenson (C)	Forwards: 9 (Canada) Kyle Buchanan; 26 (Haudenosaunee) Brett Bucktooth; 10 (Canada) Rhys Duch (A); 73 (Haudenosaunee) Dean Hill; 83 (Canada) Athan Iannucci; 42 (Canada) Lewis Ratcliff; 27 (Canada) Cliff Smith; Transition: 32 (Canada) Mitch McMichael; 41 (Canada) Bob Snider; 5 (United States) Drew Snider	Practice squad: 22 (Canada) Brett Hickey; 88 (Canada) Mike Mallory; 34 (Canada) Neil Tyacke; Holdout: 74 (Canada) Mitch Jones	Head coach {{{Head Coach}}} Legend: * Suspended list; (C) Captain; (A) Alternate captain; updated 2012-10-24; NLL Transactions

== Transactions ==
=== Trades ===
September 22, 2012	To Washington Stealth 3rd round pick, 2012 Entry Draft; 5th round pick, 2013 Entry Draft	To Philadelphia Wings Kyle Hartzell; 5th round pick, 2012 Entry Draft

=== Entry Draft ===
The 2012 NLL Entry Draft took place on October 1, 2012. The Stealth made the following selections:

Round	Overall	Player	College/Club
2	11	Tyler Garrison	Coquitlam, BC
2	12	Billy Hostrawser	Orangeville, Ontario
2	19	Justin Pychel	Six Nations, Ontario
3	21	Mitch Jones	Orangeville, Ontario
3	23	Tim Henderson	Army
4	30	TJ Cowx	Mars Hill College
6	48	Kyle Buchanan	Robert Morris University

== See also ==
- 2013 NLL season
