= 2013 Minnesota Swarm season =

2013 Minnesota Swarm
- League: NLL
- Division: 5th West
- 2013 record: 7 – 9
- Home record: 5 – 3
- Road record: 2 – 6
- Goals for: 219
- Goals against: 202
- General Manager: Joe Sullivan
- Coach: Joe Sullivan
- Captain: Andrew Suitor
- Arena: Xcel Energy Center

Team leaders
- Goals: Ryan Benesch (34)
- Assists: Callum Crawford (63)
- Points: Callum Crawford (95)
- Penalties in minutes: Tyler Hass (41)
- Loose Balls: Jordan MacIntosh (197)
- Wins: Tyler Carlson (4)
- Goals against average: Tyler Carlson (11.04)

The 2013 Minnesota Swarm season was the ninth season of the Minnesota Swarm, a lacrosse team based in Saint Paul, Minnesota playing in the National Lacrosse League.

The season did not start the way the Swarm might have hoped. Five of their first six games were decided by a single goal, but the Swarm only won two of them. They fell to 3-7 before dominating three straight home games, winning by 7, 9, and 14 goals. They finished at 7-9, good for fifth in the West but thanks to the Buffalo Bandits' 6-10 record, the Swarm crossed over to the Eastern division and made the playoffs.

In the first round, they had another dominating game, defeating the regular season champion Toronto Rock 20-11 in Toronto. But their visit to the Blue Cross Arena in Rochester was less successful, and the eventual champion Knighthawks ended the Swarm's season with a 12-10 win.

== Regular season ==
=== Final standings ===
East Division
P	Team	GP	W	L	PCT	GB	Home	Road	GF	GA	Diff	GF/GP	GA/GP
1	Toronto Rock – xyz	16	10	6	.625	0.0	5–3	5–3	194	176	+18	12.12	11.00
2	Rochester Knighthawks – x	16	8	8	.500	2.0	3–5	5–3	179	165	+14	11.19	10.31
3	Philadelphia Wings – x	16	7	9	.438	3.0	4–4	3–5	170	207	−37	10.62	12.94
4	Buffalo Bandits	16	6	10	.375	4.0	2–6	4–4	171	211	−40	10.69	13.19

West Division
P	Team	GP	W	L	PCT	GB	Home	Road	GF	GA	Diff	GF/GP	GA/GP
1	Calgary Roughnecks – xy	16	9	7	.562	0.0	3–5	6–2	222	211	+11	13.88	13.19
2	Washington Stealth – x	16	9	7	.562	0.0	5–3	4–4	193	192	+1	12.06	12.00
3	Edmonton Rush – x	16	9	7	.562	0.0	2–6	7–1	203	170	+33	12.69	10.62
4	Colorado Mammoth – x	16	7	9	.438	2.0	3–5	4–4	185	202	−17	11.56	12.62
5	Minnesota Swarm – c	16	7	9	.438	2.0	5–3	2–6	219	202	+17	13.69	12.62

x: Clinched playoff berth; c: Clinched playoff berth by crossing over to another division; y: Clinched division; z: Clinched best regular season record; GP: Games Played
W: Wins; L: Losses; GB: Games back; PCT: Win percentage; Home: Record at Home; Road: Record on the Road; GF: Goals scored; GA: Goals allowed
Differential: Difference between goals scored and allowed; GF/GP: Average number of goals scored per game; GA/GP: Average number of goals allowed per game

=== Game log ===
Game	Date	Opponent	Location	Score	OT	Attendance	Record
1	January 12, 2013	@ Buffalo Bandits	First Niagara Center	L 12–13		15,238	0–1
2	January 25, 2013	@ Toronto Rock	Air Canada Centre	L 12–13		10,504	0–2
3	January 26, 2013	Washington Stealth	Xcel Energy Center	W 15–14		8,782	1–2
4	February 2, 2013	@ Colorado Mammoth	Pepsi Center	L 9–15		16,231	1–3
5	February 8, 2013	Toronto Rock	Xcel Energy Center	W 13–12	OT	7,722	2–3
6	February 16, 2013	Calgary Roughnecks	Xcel Energy Center	L 16–17		8,254	2–4
7	February 22, 2013	@ Edmonton Rush	Rexall Place	W 13–8		6,292	3–4
8	February 24, 2013	Edmonton Rush	Xcel Energy Center	L 9–14		6,882	3–5
9	March 3, 2013	@ Washington Stealth	Comcast Arena	L 8–11		2,663	3–6
10	March 8, 2013	@ Calgary Roughnecks	Scotiabank Saddledome	L 15–19		8,622	3–7
11	March 16, 2013	Washington Stealth	Xcel Energy Center	W 12–5		7,830	4–7
12	March 29, 2013	Philadelphia Wings	Xcel Energy Center	W 20–11		8,079	5–7
13	April 6, 2013	Buffalo Bandits	Xcel Energy Center	W 21–7		10,167	6–7
14	April 7, 2013	@ Philadelphia Wings	Wells Fargo Center	L 13–15		6,861	6–8
15	April 13, 2013	@ Colorado Mammoth	Pepsi Center	W 17–12		17,622	7–8
16	April 20, 2013	Colorado Mammoth	Xcel Energy Center	L 14–16		12,214	7–9

== Playoffs ==
=== Game log ===
Game	Date	Opponent	Location	Score	OT	Attendance	Record
Division Semifinal	April 28, 2013	@ Toronto Rock	Air Canada Centre	W 20–11		9,066	1–0
Division Final	May 4, 2013	@ Rochester Knighthawks	Blue Cross Arena	L 10–12		5,096	1–1

== Roster ==
2013 Minnesota Swarm roster
Active (21-man) roster		Inactive roster	Coaches
Goaltenders: 30 (Canada) Tyler Carlson; 31 (Canada) Zach Higgins; 35 (Canada) Evan Kirk; Defensemen: 39 (Canada) Dan Ball; 85 (United States) Mitch Belisle; 79 (Canada) Nik Bilic; 10 (Canada) Alex Crepinsek; 8 (United States) Greg Downing; 4 (United States) Jeff Gilbert (A)	Forwards: 21 (Canada) Ryan Benesch; 77 (Canada) Jay Card; 98 (Canada) Callum Crawford (C); 66 (United States) Matt Gibson; 81 (Canada) Josh Gillam; 32 (Canada) Shayne Jackson; 27 (United States) Pat Smith; 84 (Canada) Corbyn Tao; Transition: 33 (United States) David Earl; 9 (Canada) Tyler Hass; 24 (Canada) Jordan MacIntosh; 46 (Canada) Kiel Matisz; 3 (Canada) Brock Sorensen; 20 (Canada) Andrew Suitor (C); 22 (Canada) Andrew Watt	Practice squad: 89 (Canada) Ryan Masters; 16 (United States) Michael O'Brien	Head coach {{{Head Coach}}} Legend: * Suspended list; (C) Captain; (A) Alternate captain; updated 2013-04-21; NLL Transactions

== Transactions ==
=== Trades ===
July 26, 2012	To Minnesota Swarm 1st round selection, 2015 entry draft	To Philadelphia Wings Kevin Ross
July 27, 2012	To Minnesota Swarm Shawn Williams	To Edmonton Rush Two 2nd round selections, 2013 entry draft
July 27, 2012	To Minnesota Swarm 3rd overall selection, 2012 entry draft	To Buffalo Bandits Shawn Williams; Brendan Doran; 5th, 14th, and 18th overall selections, 2012 entry draft

=== Entry Draft ===
The 2012 NLL Entry Draft took place on October 1, 2012. The Swarm made the following selections:

Round	Overall	Player	College/Club
1	2	Brock Sorenson	Ohio State University
1	3	Kiel Matisz	Robert Morris University
1	4	Shayne Jackson	Limestone College
1	10	Alex Crepinsek	Rochester Institute of Technology
3	24	Sam Bradman	Salisbury College
4	37	Tyler Tanguay	Adrian College
5	42	Bryan Campbell	Brock University
5	46	Matt Gibson	Yale University
6	49	Michael Teeter	Victoria, BC
6	51	Chris Cudmore	Mars Hill College

== See also ==
- 2013 NLL season
