= 2013 Rochester Knighthawks season =

2013 Rochester Knighthawks
- Champion's Cup Champions
- East Division Champions
- League: NLL
- Division: 2nd East
- 2013 record: 8 – 8
- Home record: 3 – 5
- Road record: 5 – 3
- Goals for: 179
- Goals against: 165
- General Manager: Curt Styres
- Coach: Mike Hasen
- Captain: Sid Smith
- Alternate captains: Mike Accursi; Mike Kirk
- Arena: Blue Cross Arena

Team leaders
- Goals: Cody Jamieson (28)
- Assists: Cody Jamieson (61)
- Points: Cody Jamieson (89)
- Penalties in minutes: Ian Llord (34); Paul Dawson (34)
- Loose Balls: Brad Self (96)
- Wins: Matt Vinc (8)
- Goals against average: Matt Vinc (10.17)

The Rochester Knighthawks were a lacrosse team based in Rochester, New York, that played in the National Lacrosse League (NLL). The 2013 season was the 19th in franchise history.

The Knighthawks finished the season second in the East division with an 8-8 record. But for the second straight year, they got hot in the playoffs, defeating the Philadelphia Wings, Minnesota Swarm, and Washington Stealth to win their second straight NLL Championship.

== Regular season ==
=== Final standings ===
East Division
P	Team	GP	W	L	PCT	GB	Home	Road	GF	GA	Diff	GF/GP	GA/GP
1	Toronto Rock – xyz	16	10	6	.625	0.0	5–3	5–3	194	176	+18	12.12	11.00
2	Rochester Knighthawks – x	16	8	8	.500	2.0	3–5	5–3	179	165	+14	11.19	10.31
3	Philadelphia Wings – x	16	7	9	.438	3.0	4–4	3–5	170	207	−37	10.62	12.94
4	Buffalo Bandits	16	6	10	.375	4.0	2–6	4–4	171	211	−40	10.69	13.19

West Division
P	Team	GP	W	L	PCT	GB	Home	Road	GF	GA	Diff	GF/GP	GA/GP
1	Calgary Roughnecks – xy	16	9	7	.562	0.0	3–5	6–2	222	211	+11	13.88	13.19
2	Washington Stealth – x	16	9	7	.562	0.0	5–3	4–4	193	192	+1	12.06	12.00
3	Edmonton Rush – x	16	9	7	.562	0.0	2–6	7–1	203	170	+33	12.69	10.62
4	Colorado Mammoth – x	16	7	9	.438	2.0	3–5	4–4	185	202	−17	11.56	12.62
5	Minnesota Swarm – c	16	7	9	.438	2.0	5–3	2–6	219	202	+17	13.69	12.62

x: Clinched playoff berth; c: Clinched playoff berth by crossing over to another division; y: Clinched division; z: Clinched best regular season record; GP: Games Played
W: Wins; L: Losses; GB: Games back; PCT: Win percentage; Home: Record at Home; Road: Record on the Road; GF: Goals scored; GA: Goals allowed
Differential: Difference between goals scored and allowed; GF/GP: Average number of goals scored per game; GA/GP: Average number of goals allowed per game

== Game log ==
Game	Date	Opponent	Location	Score	OT	Attendance	Record
1	January 5, 2013	@ Washington Stealth	Comcast Arena	L 12–13		7,023	0–1
2	January 19, 2013	Buffalo Bandits	Blue Cross Arena	L 13–14		7,834	0–2
3	January 26, 2013	Toronto Rock	Blue Cross Arena	L 7–11		5,762	0–3
4	February 2, 2013	Washington Stealth	Blue Cross Arena	W 7–6		7,914	1–3
5	February 8, 2013	Philadelphia Wings	Blue Cross Arena	W 20–10		5,139	2–3
6	February 9, 2013	@ Buffalo Bandits	First Niagara Center	W 15–7		14,833	3–3
7	February 16, 2013	Buffalo Bandits	Blue Cross Arena	L 6–10		9,156	3–4
8	February 23, 2013	Philadelphia Wings	Blue Cross Arena	L 8–10		6,674	3–5
9	March 2, 2013	@ Colorado Mammoth	Pepsi Center	W 12–11		16,118	4–5
10	March 16, 2013	Edmonton Rush	Blue Cross Arena	L 9–11		7,009	4–6
11	March 30, 2013	Toronto Rock	Blue Cross Arena	W 12–8		7,013	5–6
12	April 6, 2013	Philadelphia Wings	Blue Cross Arena	W 14–7		7,467	6–6
13	April 7, 2013	@ Toronto Rock	Air Canada Centre	L 9–10		10,073	6–7
14	April 13, 2013	@ Calgary Roughnecks	Scotiabank Saddledome	W 15–14		12,340	7–7
15	April 14, 2013	@ Edmonton Rush	Rexall Place	L 10–14		6,116	7–8
16	April 20, 2013	@ Buffalo Bandits	First Niagara Center	W 10–9		19,070	8–8

== Playoffs ==
=== Game log ===
Game	Date	Opponent	Location	Score	OT	Attendance	Record
Division Semifinal	April 27, 2013	Philadelphia Wings	Blue Cross Arena	W 10–8		5,963	1–0
Division Final	May 4, 2013	Minnesota Swarm	Blue Cross Arena	W 12–10		5,096	2–0
Final	May 11, 2013	@ Washington Stealth	Comcast Arena	W 11–10		5,200	3–0

== Roster ==
2013 Rochester Knighthawks roster
Active (21-man) roster		Inactive roster	Coaches
Goaltenders: 55 (Haudenosaunee) Angus Goodleaf; 48 (Canada) Matt Vinc; Defensemen: 4 (Canada) Jamie Batson; 7 (Canada) Tyler Burton; 37 (Canada) Scott Campbell; 2 (Canada) Paul Dawson; 16 (Canada) Dylan Evans; 86 (Canada) Rory Glaves; 26 (Canada) Mike Kirk (A); 79 (Haudenosaunee) Sid Smith (C); 29 (Canada) Ian Llord	Forwards: 44 (Canada) Mike Accursi (A); 6 (Canada) Dan Dawson; 66 (Haudenosaunee) Alex Kedoh Hill; 88 (Haudenosaunee) Cody Jamieson; 28 (Canada) Stephen Keogh; 9 (Haudenosaunee) Craig Point; 22 (United States) Casey Powell; 93 (Haudenosaunee) Johnny Powless; 23 (Canada) Cory Vitarelli; 1 (United States) Joe Walters; Transition: 14 (Canada) Matt Hummel; 10 (Canada) Joel McCready; 25 (Canada) Brad Self	Practice squad: 45 (Canada) Cody McLeod; 83 (Haudenosaunee) Tom Montour; Holdout: -- (Canada) Jamison Koesterer; 17 (Canada) Kyle Laverty; Unable to play: 50 (Canada) Ryan Cousins	Head coach {{{Head Coach}}} Legend: * Suspended list; (C) Captain; (A) Alternate captain; updated 2011-12-22; NLL Transactions

== Transactions ==
=== Trades ===
December 14, 2012	To Rochester Knighthawks Dan Dawson; Paul Dawson; 1st round pick, 2016 entry draft	To Philadelphia Wings Paul Rabil; Jordan Hall; Joel White; Rob Campbell; 2nd round pick, 2014 entry draft

=== Entry Draft ===
The 2012 NLL Entry Draft took place on October 1, 2012. The Knighthawks made the following selections:

Round	Overall	Player	College/Club
3	26	Robbie Campbell	Stony Brook University
3	29	Cody Hawkins	Delta, BC
4	38	Matt Hummel	Mercyhurst University
5	47	Chris Attwood	St. Catharines, Ontario
6	56	Cody McLeod	Orangeville, Ontario

== See also ==
- 2013 NLL season
