= 2013 Philadelphia Wings season =

2013 Philadelphia Wings
- League: NLL
- Division: 3rd East
- 2013 record: 7–9
- Home record: 4–4
- Road record: 3–5
- Goals for: 170
- Goals against: 207
- General Manager: Johnny Mouradian
- Coach: Johnny Mouradian
- Captain: Brodie Merrill
- Alternate captains: Kevin Ross; Brett Manney
- Arena: Wells Fargo Center
- Average attendance: 7,647

Team leaders
- Goals: Kevin Crowley (34)
- Assists: Kevin Crowley (38); Kevin Buchanan (38)
- Points: Kevin Crowley (72)
- Penalties in minutes: Mike Manley (26)
- Loose Balls: Brodie Merrill (123)
- Wins: Brandon Miller (7)
- Goals against average: Brandon Miller (11.92)

The Philadelphia Wings are a lacrosse team based in Philadelphia playing in the National Lacrosse League (NLL). The 2013 season was the 27th in franchise history.

The Wings finished with a 7–9 record, good for 3rd place in the Eastern division. They made the playoffs in consecutive years for the first time since 2002, but fell to the defending (and eventual) Champion Rochester Knighthawks 10–8 in the division semi-final.

== Regular season ==
=== Conference standings ===
East Division
P	Team	GP	W	L	PCT	GB	Home	Road	GF	GA	Diff	GF/GP	GA/GP
1	Toronto Rock – xyz	16	10	6	.625	0.0	5–3	5–3	194	176	+18	12.12	11.00
2	Rochester Knighthawks – x	16	8	8	.500	2.0	3–5	5–3	179	165	+14	11.19	10.31
3	Philadelphia Wings – x	16	7	9	.438	3.0	4–4	3–5	170	207	−37	10.62	12.94
4	Buffalo Bandits	16	6	10	.375	4.0	2–6	4–4	171	211	−40	10.69	13.19

West Division
P	Team	GP	W	L	PCT	GB	Home	Road	GF	GA	Diff	GF/GP	GA/GP
1	Calgary Roughnecks – xy	16	9	7	.562	0.0	3–5	6–2	222	211	+11	13.88	13.19
2	Washington Stealth – x	16	9	7	.562	0.0	5–3	4–4	193	192	+1	12.06	12.00
3	Edmonton Rush – x	16	9	7	.562	0.0	2–6	7–1	203	170	+33	12.69	10.62
4	Colorado Mammoth – x	16	7	9	.438	2.0	3–5	4–4	185	202	−17	11.56	12.62
5	Minnesota Swarm – c	16	7	9	.438	2.0	5–3	2–6	219	202	+17	13.69	12.62

x: Clinched playoff berth; c: Clinched playoff berth by crossing over to another division; y: Clinched division; z: Clinched best regular season record; GP: Games Played
W: Wins; L: Losses; GB: Games back; PCT: Win percentage; Home: Record at Home; Road: Record on the Road; GF: Goals scored; GA: Goals allowed
Differential: Difference between goals scored and allowed; GF/GP: Average number of goals scored per game; GA/GP: Average number of goals allowed per game

== Game log ==
Game	Date	Opponent	Location	Score	OT	Attendance	Record
1	January 11, 2013	Buffalo Bandits	Wells Fargo Center	W 13–8		9,096	1–0
2	January 19, 2013	@ Toronto Rock	Air Canada Centre	W 8–7		11,703	2–0
3	January 26, 2013	@ Buffalo Bandits	First Niagara Center	L 13–14		13,808	2–1
4	January 27, 2013	Calgary Roughnecks	Wells Fargo Center	L 8–16		8,785	2–2
5	February 8, 2013	Rochester Knighthawks	Wells Fargo Center	L 10–20		5,139	2–3
6	February 23, 2013	@ Rochester Knighthawks	Blue Cross Arena	W 10–8		6,674	3–3
7	February 24, 2013	Colorado Mammoth	Wells Fargo Center	W 14–12		8,606	4–3
8	March 1, 2013	@ Buffalo Bandits	First Niagara Center	W 11–10	OT	14,036	5–3
9	March 9, 2013	Washington Stealth	Wells Fargo Center	L 10–16		7,661	5–4
10	March 16, 2013	Toronto Rock	Wells Fargo Center	L 8–13		7,593	5–5
11	March 29, 2013	@ Minnesota Swarm	Xcel Energy Center	L 11–20		8,079	5–6
12	March 30, 2013	@ Colorado Mammoth	Pepsi Center	L 9–10		15,292	5–7
13	April 6, 2013	@ Rochester Knighthawks	Blue Cross Arena	L 7–14		7,467	5–8
14	April 7, 2013	Minnesota Swarm	Wells Fargo Center	W 15–13		6,861	6–8
15	April 13, 2013	Toronto Rock	Wells Fargo Center	W 10–9	OT	7,437	7–8
16	April 20, 2013	@ Washington Stealth	Comcast Arena	L 13–17		4,352	7–9

=== Playoffs ===
Game	Date	Opponent	Location	Score	OT	Attendance	Record
Division Semifinal	April 27, 2013	@ Rochester Knighthawks	Blue Cross Arena	L 8–10		5,963	0–1

== Roster ==
2013 Philadelphia Wings roster
Active (21-man) roster		Inactive roster	Coaches
Goaltenders: 31 (Canada) Angus Dineley; 36 (Canada) Brandon Miller; Defensemen: 4 (United States) C.J. Costabile; 25 (United States) Pat Heim; 8 (United States) Steve Holmes; 13 (United States) Brett Manney; 5 (United States) Michael Manley; 21 (United States) Jeff Reynolds; 55 (United States) Chad Wiedmaier	Forwards: 27 (United States) Kevin Buchanan; 22 (United States) Ned Crotty; 10 (Canada) Kevin Crowley; 99 (Haudenosaunee) Brandon Francis; 19 (United States) Mike McLellan; 2 (United States) Brendan Mundorf; 71 (Canada) Kevin Ross; 26 (United States) Drew Westervelt; Transition: 44 (Canada) Jordan Hall; 81 (United States) Kyle Hartzell; 17 (Canada) Brodie Merrill (C); 9 (United States) Paul Rabil; 7 (United States) Kyle Sweeney; 11 (United States) Joel White	Practice squad: 3 (United States) Ethan Farrell; 20 (United States) Jim Forsythe; Injured reserve: -- (United States) Dan Hardy; – (United States) Eric Hoffman; Unable to play: 6 (Canada) Rob Campbell; 41 (United States) John McFadyen; 18 (United States) Max Seibald (A)	Head coach {{{Head Coach}}} Legend: * Suspended list; (C) Captain; (A) Alternate captain; Roster updated 2012-08-10; NLL Transactions

== Transactions ==
=== Trades ===
August 13, 2012	To Philadelphia Wings Kevin Buchanan; Third round selection, 2013 Entry Draft	To Buffalo Bandits David Brock; Mike Hominuck
September 22, 2012	To Philadelphia Wings Kyle Hartzell; 5th round pick, 2012 Entry Draft	To Washington Stealth 3rd round pick, 2012 Entry Draft; 5th round pick, 2013 Entry Draft
December 14, 2012	To Philadelphia Wings Paul Rabil; Jordan Hall; Joel White; Rob Campbell; 2nd round pick, 2014 entry draft	To Rochester Knighthawks Dan Dawson; Paul Dawson; 1st round pick, 2016 entry draft
December 18, 2012	To Philadelphia Wings Kevin Croswell	To Washington Stealth 3rd round selection, 2013 Entry Draft

=== Entry Draft ===
The 2012 NLL Entry Draft took place on October 1, 2012. The Wings made the following selections:

Round	Overall	Player	College/Club
4	32	Michael Manley	Duke University
5	39	CJ Costabile	Duke University
5	41	Kevin Randall	University of Notre Dame

== See also ==
- 2013 NLL season
