= Jim Moss =

Canadian lacrosse player

Personal information
- Nickname: The Axe
- Born: March 3, 1977 (age 49) Toronto, Ontario, Canada
- Height: 6 ft 0 in (183 cm)
- Weight: 210 lb (95 kg; 15 st 0 lb)

Sport
- Position: Defense
- Shoots: Right
- NLL team Former teams: Colorado Mammoth; San Jose Stealth; Albany Attack
- Pro career: 2001–2008

Jim Moss (born March 3, 1977, in Toronto, Ontario) is a former professional lacrosse player. Moss was named the National Lacrosse League's Defensive Player of the Year in 2003. Entered into the Brampton Sports Hall of Fame in 2007 as well as the Canadian Lacrosse Hall of Fame as a member of Team Canada in 2007. Moss represented Team Canada in three sports (Ice Hockey, Field Lacrosse, Indoor Lacrosse) winning gold, silver, and bronze medals in international competition and is a winner of Canada's historic Mann Cup.

== Hockey and Lacrosse Statistics ==
=== National Lacrosse League ===
		Regular Season						Playoffs
Season	Team	GP	G	A	Pts	LB	PIM	GP	G	A	Pts	LB	PIM
2001	Albany	5	2	6	8	24	4	--	--	--	--	--	--
2002	Albany	16	9	12	21	127	53	2	0	1	1	16	7
2003	Albany	16	11	5	16	113	42	--	--	--	--	--	--
2004	San Jose	16	11	5	16	82	44	1	1	1	2	9	0
2005	San Jose	16	4	5	9	85	34	--	--	--	--	--	--
2006	San Jose	12	1	1	2	57	35	--	--	--	--	--	--
2007	Colorado	8	3	8	11	40	36	0	0	0	0	0	0
NLL totals		89	41	42	83	528	248	3	1	2	3	25	7

== Hockey and Lacrosse career ==
Jim Moss played both ice hockey and lacrosse his entire early life and ultimately earned the opportunity to represent team Canada in three sports - Ice Hockey, Field Lacrosse, and Indoor Lacrosse.

Growing up, he played hockey in Brampton, Ontario, Canada starting at the age of seven, where he is now a member of the Brampton Sports Hall of Fame. He began playing Junior A tier 2 for the Brampton Capitals at the age of 15 and then went on to become a member of the London Knights OHL hockey club for the 96-97 season and the 97-98 season. He was named team captain of the 97-98 squad. Following the Ontario Hockey League, he played for the Western Mustangs University team in the CIAU and represented Team Canada at the FISU World Games in Slovakia, where the team earned a bronze medal. He finished his hockey career off with the Huntington Blizzards of the ECHL after suffering a number of concussions he was forced to take a season off and decided at that time to return to professional lacrosse in NLL.

Jim's lacrosse career also began in Brampton Ontario, playing in the Ontario Minor Lacrosse Association. He was called up to play Junior for the Brampton Excelsiors in 1992, and then represented Canada with the Jr Men's National Lacrosse team in 1996. Jim served as Team Captain in their silver medal winning effort. Jim was also selected to represent Team Canada in the first ever World Indoor Lacrosse Championship where he won his first gold medal. Jim also played for the Brampton Excelsiors Sr. Lacrosse team where he won his first Mann Cup in 2005, scoring the series winning goal against the Victoria Shamrocks. While living and playing lacrosse in San Jose California, Jim coached children at all ages and competitive classes, both men's and women's lacrosse, and including an assistant coaching role with the Stanford NCAA Division 1 Women's lacrosse program.

== Personal life ==
Jim has been married to his wife Jennifer Leigh Moss (née Young) since July 9, 2005. The couple has three daughters, Willow, Olivia and Lyla.

In September 2009, Jim Moss contracted what was believed to be Guillane-Barre Syndrome. Since then this diagnosis has been rescinded, leaving his diagnosis as an undefined post-viral neuro-muscular disease. The Auto-immune disease ended Jim's professional sports career.

Preceded by Pat Coyle	NLL Defensive Player of the Year; 2003	Succeeded by Cam Woods, Taylor Wray
