= 2013 Colorado Mammoth season =

Lacrosse team season

2013 Colorado Mammoth
- League: NLL
- Division: 4th West
- 2013 record: 7 – 9
- Home record: 3 – 5
- Road record: 4 – 4
- Goals for: 185
- Goals against: 202
- General Manager: Steve Govett
- Coach: Bob Hamley
- Captain: Gavin Prout
- Alternate captains: John Grant, Jr. Jon Sullivan
- Arena: Pepsi Center

Team leaders
- Goals: John Grant, Jr. (43)
- Assists: John Grant, Jr. (48)
- Points: John Grant, Jr. (91)
- Penalties in minutes: Chet Koneczny (54)
- Loose Balls: Joey Cupido (101)
- Wins: Tye Belanger (5)
- Goals against average: Tye Belanger (10.77)

The Colorado Mammoth are a lacrosse team based in Denver, Colorado playing in the National Lacrosse League (NLL). The 2013 season was the 27th in franchise history and 11th as the Mammoth (previously the Washington Power, Pittsburgh Crossefire, and Baltimore Thunder).

The Mammoth survived a 2-7 start to the season, finishing strong and ending up at 7-9, good for 4th place in the West. But for the third straight year, they were ousted in the first round of the playoffs, this time by the Calgary Roughnecks, 15-10.

== Regular season ==
=== Conference standings ===
East Division
P	Team	GP	W	L	PCT	GB	Home	Road	GF	GA	Diff	GF/GP	GA/GP
1	Toronto Rock – xyz	16	10	6	.625	0.0	5–3	5–3	194	176	+18	12.12	11.00
2	Rochester Knighthawks – x	16	8	8	.500	2.0	3–5	5–3	179	165	+14	11.19	10.31
3	Philadelphia Wings – x	16	7	9	.438	3.0	4–4	3–5	170	207	−37	10.62	12.94
4	Buffalo Bandits	16	6	10	.375	4.0	2–6	4–4	171	211	−40	10.69	13.19

West Division
P	Team	GP	W	L	PCT	GB	Home	Road	GF	GA	Diff	GF/GP	GA/GP
1	Calgary Roughnecks – xy	16	9	7	.562	0.0	3–5	6–2	222	211	+11	13.88	13.19
2	Washington Stealth – x	16	9	7	.562	0.0	5–3	4–4	193	192	+1	12.06	12.00
3	Edmonton Rush – x	16	9	7	.562	0.0	2–6	7–1	203	170	+33	12.69	10.62
4	Colorado Mammoth – x	16	7	9	.438	2.0	3–5	4–4	185	202	−17	11.56	12.62
5	Minnesota Swarm – c	16	7	9	.438	2.0	5–3	2–6	219	202	+17	13.69	12.62

x: Clinched playoff berth; c: Clinched playoff berth by crossing over to another division; y: Clinched division; z: Clinched best regular season record; GP: Games Played
W: Wins; L: Losses; GB: Games back; PCT: Win percentage; Home: Record at Home; Road: Record on the Road; GF: Goals scored; GA: Goals allowed
Differential: Difference between goals scored and allowed; GF/GP: Average number of goals scored per game; GA/GP: Average number of goals allowed per game

== Game log ==
Game	Date	Opponent	Location	Score	OT	Attendance	Record
1	January 12, 2013	Washington Stealth	Pepsi Center	L 13–17		13,148	0–1
2	January 19, 2013	@ Calgary Roughnecks	Scotiabank Saddledome	W 13–12	OT	8,221	1–1
3	January 25, 2013	Calgary Roughnecks	Pepsi Center	L 12–19		15,103	1–2
4	February 2, 2013	Minnesota Swarm	Pepsi Center	W 15–9		16,231	2–2
5	February 9, 2013	@ Washington Stealth	Comcast Arena	L 6–13		3,683	2–3
6	February 16, 2013	Edmonton Rush	Pepsi Center	L 7–14		17,059	2–4
7	February 24, 2013	@ Philadelphia Wings	Wells Fargo Center	L 12–14		8,606	2–5
8	March 2, 2013	Rochester Knighthawks	Pepsi Center	L 11–12		16,118	2–6
9	March 8, 2013	@ Toronto Rock	Air Canada Centre	L 10–14		10,823	2–7
10	March 9, 2013	@ Buffalo Bandits	First Niagara Center	W 12–6		16,428	3–7
11	March 16, 2013	Buffalo Bandits	Pepsi Center	W 16–13		15,511	4–7
12	March 23, 2013	@ Calgary Roughnecks	Scotiabank Saddledome	L 11–12	OT	9,493	4–8
13	March 30, 2013	Philadelphia Wings	Pepsi Center	W 10–9		15,292	5–8
14	April 6, 2013	@ Edmonton Rush	Rexall Place	W 9–7		7,172	6–8
15	April 13, 2013	Minnesota Swarm	Pepsi Center	L 12–17		17,622	6–9
16	April 20, 2013	@ Minnesota Swarm	Xcel Energy Center	W 16–14		12,214	7–9

== Playoffs ==
=== Game log ===
Game	Date	Opponent	Location	Score	OT	Attendance	Record
Division Semifinal	April 27, 2013	@ Calgary Roughnecks	Scotiabank Saddledome	L 10–15		8,726	0–1

== Roster ==
2013 Colorado Mammoth roster
Active (21-man) roster		Inactive roster	Coaches
Goaltenders: 31 (Canada) Tye Belanger; 35 (Canada) Dan Lewis; Defensemen: 37 (Canada) Dan Coates; 11 (Canada) John Gallant; 12 (United States) Jarett Park; 62 (Canada) Creighton Reid; 42 (Canada) Rory Smith; 23 (Canada) Jon Sullivan (A)	Forwards: 82 (Canada) Joey Cupido; 77 (Canada) Colton Clark; 96 (Canada) Joel Dalgarno; 24 (Canada) John Grant, Jr. (A); 16 (Canada) Adam Jones; 44 (Canada) Jamie Lincoln; 14 (Canada) Jordan McBride; 17 (Canada) Sean Pollock; 9 (Canada) Gavin Prout (C); Transition: 15 (Canada) Ilija Gajic; 4 (Canada) Jaeden Gastaldo; 19 (Canada) Cameron Holding; 21 (Canada) Chet Koneczny; 13 (Canada) Mat MacLeod; 88 (Canada) Richard Morgan	Practice squad: 3 (United States) Alex Demopoulos; 25 (United States) Eric Martin; Injured reserve: 55 (Canada) Mac Allen; Holdout: 88 (Canada) Ian Hawksbee; Protected list: -- (United States) Tom Ethington; -- (United States) Ryan Hotaling; Unable to play: -- (United States) Ken Clausen; 56 (United States) Jon Orsen	Head coach {{{Head Coach}}} Legend: * Suspended list; (C) Captain; (A) Alternate captain; updated 2011-12-21; NLL Transactions

== Transactions ==
=== Trades ===
December 5, 2012	To Colorado Mammoth Conditional 5th round pick, 2014 entry draft	To Buffalo Bandits Derek Hopcroft

=== Entry Draft ===
The 2012 NLL Entry Draft took place on October 1, 2012. The Mammoth made the following selections:

Round	Overall	Player	College/Club
1	9	Colton Clark	Bellarmine University
5	44	Jaden Gastaldo	Burnaby, BC
6	53	Alex Demopoulos	University of Denver

== See also ==
- 2013 NLL season
