= National Lacrosse League Defensive Player of the Year Award =

The Defensive Player of the Year Award is given annually to the National Lacrosse League player (not goaltenders) who is chosen as the best defensive player.

== Past winners ==
Season	Winner	Team	Win #	Other finalists
2026	Callum Jones	Ottawa Black Bears	1	Ryan Dilks, Vancouver Warriors; Brad Kri, Toronto Rock
2025	Matt Hossack	Saskatchewan Rush	1	Ryan Dilks, Vancouver Warriors; Graeme Hossack, Halifax Thunderbirds
2024	Ryan Dilks	Vancouver Warriors	2	Mitch de Snoo, Toronto Rock; Brad Kri, Toronto Rock
2023	Latrell Harris	Toronto Rock	1	Graeme Hossack, Halifax Thunderbirds; Brad Kri, Toronto Rock
2022	Mitch de Snoo	Toronto Rock	1	Steve Priolo, Buffalo Bandits; Kyle Rubisch, Saskatchewan Rush
2021	Season cancelled			
2020	Graeme Hossack	Halifax Thunderbirds	3	Robert Hope, Colorado Mammoth; Kyle Rubisch, Saskatchewan Rush
2019	Graeme Hossack	Rochester Knighthawks	2	Steve Priolo, Buffalo Bandits; Kyle Rubisch, Saskatchewan Rush
2018	Graeme Hossack	Rochester Knighthawks	1	Robert Hope, Colorado Mammoth; Kyle Rubisch, Saskatchewan Rush
2017	Jason Noble	Georgia Swarm	1	Graeme Hossack, Rochester Knighthawks; Steve Priolo, Buffalo Bandits
2016	Ryan Dilks	Saskatchewan Rush	1	Chris Corbeil, Saskatchewan Rush; Steve Priolo, Buffalo Bandits
2015	Kyle Rubisch	Edmonton Rush	4	Chris Corbeil, Edmonton Rush; Steve Priolo, Buffalo Bandits
2014	Kyle Rubisch	Edmonton Rush	3	Chris Corbeil, Edmonton Rush; Steve Priolo, Buffalo Bandits
2013	Kyle Rubisch	Edmonton Rush	2	
2012	Kyle Rubisch	Edmonton Rush	1	
2011	Pat McCready	Rochester Knighthawks	1	
2010	Sandy Chapman	Toronto Rock	1	
2009	Billy Dee Smith	Buffalo Bandits	1	
2008	Ryan Cousins	Minnesota Swarm	2	
2007	Ryan Cousins	Minnesota Swarm	1	
2006	Brodie Merrill	Portland LumberJax	1	
2005	Andrew Turner	Rochester Knighthawks	1	
2004 (Tie)	Cam Woods	San Jose Stealth	1	
2004 (Tie)	Taylor Wray	Calgary Roughnecks	1	
2003	Jim Moss	Albany Attack	1	
2002	Pat Coyle	Toronto Rock	1	
