= Taylor Wray =

American lacrosse coach

Current position
- Title: Head coach
- Team: Penn
- Record: 120–69

Biographical details
- Born: June 27, 1981 (age 45); Edmonton, Alberta

Playing career
- 2000–2003: Duke
- 2004–2006: Calgary Roughnecks
- 2007–2012: Philadelphia Wings

Coaching career (HC unless noted)
- 2003–2006: Queens University of Charlotte (asst.)
- 2007: National Sports Academy
- 2008–2011: Lehigh (asst.)
- 2012–2025: Saint Joseph's
- 2026–present: Penn

Accomplishments and honors

Championships
- As a Player: 2-time ACC Tournament Champion; 2004 NLL Champion; As a Coach: 2022 NEC Tournament Champion; 2024 A10 Tournament Champion

Awards
- As a Player: 2003 Eric Tyler Hardy Defensive Player of the Year; 2004 NLL Rookie of the Year; 2004 NLL Defensive Player of the Year; 2004 First-Team All Pro; As a Coach: 6-time NEC Coach of the Year; 2-time A10 Coach of the Year

Records
- Saint Joseph's All-Time Winningest Coach

Taylor Wray (born June 27, 1981) is a Canadian lacrosse coach and former player. Wray is the current Head Coach of the University of Pennsylvania men's lacrosse team. Wray played for the Calgary Roughnecks and Philadelphia Wings of the National Lacrosse League. Taylor's older brother Devan Wray is a former NLL player and former assistant coach for the Edmonton Rush.

== Professional career ==
Born in Edmonton, Alberta, Wray began his career with the Calgary Roughnecks in 2004, and won the NLL Championship with the Roughnecks that year. Wray was named both Rookie of the Year and Defensive Player of the Year in 2004.

In July 2007, Wray was traded to the Philadelphia Wings in a three-team blockbuster trade.

== Coaching career ==
Prior to the 2008 NCAA season, Wray was named Assistant Coach of the Lehigh University lacrosse team, under Head Coach Kevin Cassese. Prior to this, He had served as Assistant Coach for Queens University of Charlotte.

During the summer of 2011, Wray was named Head Coach of the Saint Joseph's University men's lacrosse team. Prior to the start of the 2013 season, Philadelphia head coach Johnny Mouradian announced that Wray has told the team he will not be returning to Wings.

Wray improved the St. Joseph Hawks' win total by six in 2012. In his third season as coach, Wray led the Hawks to the NEC Regular Season Championship, after going undefeated in conference play. The Hawks were regular season champions four out of the next five seasons and appeared in three NEC Title Games.

Wray won his first conference tournament in 2022 while once again leading the Hawks through NEC play undefeated. The Hawks made their first ever NCAA Tournament that year, losing to Yale in the first round 18–16.

Wray is the winningest coach in Saint Joseph's lacrosse history with a record of 120–69 in 13 seasons. Over that time, Wray has won eight conference coach of the years, coached four All-Americans, and two PLL draft picks.

== Personal life ==
Wray married Lauren Gallagher, a former All-American Lacrosse player at Duke. They have two sons and a daughter.

== Statistics ==
=== NLL ===
		Regular Season						Playoffs
Season	Team	GP	G	A	Pts	LB	PIM	GP	G	A	Pts	LB	PIM
2004	Calgary	14	8	8	16	82	44	3	4	2	6	24	4
2005	Calgary	11	2	13	15	90	26	1	0	1	1	13	4
2006	Calgary	14	6	16	22	102	33	1	0	0	0	8	0
2007	Calgary	16	5	9	14	119	45	1	0	1	1	8	0
2008	Philadelphia	12	3	8	11	86	31	1	0	1	1	7	0
2009	Philadelphia	12	2	9	11	60	24	–	–	–	–	–	–
2010	Philadelphia	13	0	3	3	51	29	–	–	–	–	–	–
2011	Philadelphia	12	0	1	1	44	18	–	–	–	–	–	–
NLL totals		104	26	67	93	634	250	7	4	5	9	60	8

== Awards ==
Preceded by Brian Langtry	NLL Rookie of the Year; 2004	Succeeded by Ryan Boyle
Preceded by Jim Moss	NLL Defensive Player of the Year (tie with Cam Woods); 2004	Succeeded by Andrew Turner
