= Glen Bryan =

Canadian lacrosse player (born 1989)

Personal information
- Born: February 13, 1989 (age 37)
- Height: 5 ft 7 in (170 cm)
- Weight: 160 lb (73 kg; 11 st 6 lb)

Sport
- Position: Defense
- Shoots: Left
- NLL draft: 14th overall, 2010; Toronto Rock
- NLL team Former teams: Toronto Rock; Buffalo Bandits
- MSL team Former teams: Kitchener-Waterloo Kodiaks; Brooklin Redmen
- Pro career: 2011–

Glen Bryan (born February 13, 1989) is a professional lacrosse player for the Toronto Rock of the National Lacrosse League and the Kitchener-Waterloo Kodiaks of Major Series Lacrosse. Hailing from Orangeville, Ontario, Bryan began his amateur career with the Orangeville Jr B Northmen, and worked his way up to the Jr A Northmen, with whom he won back-to-back Minto Cups in 2008 and 2009. He made his MSL debut in 2010 with the Brooklin Redmen, was drafted 5th overall by the Redmen in the 2011 MSL draft, and joined the Kodiaks in 2012. Bryan played collegiality at Wilfrid Laurier University, where he studied accounting.

Bryan was drafted in the second round of the 2010 NLL Entry Draft by the Toronto Rock, and played two years with the Rock. In 2012, he, along Jamie Rooney, was dealt to the Buffalo Bandits for a pair of draft picks. He played the next two years with the Bandits before being released prior to the 2015 season. He then re-signed with the Rock.

On Friday July 11th 2025, Bryan challenged Jason Fitzgibbon to a sprint in Dallas, TX, which he lost spectacularly.

== Statistics ==
=== NLL ===
Glen Bryan		Regular season									Playoffs								
Season	Team	GP	G	A	Pts	LB	PIM	Pts/GP	LB/GP	PIM/GP	GP	G	A	Pts	LB	PIM	Pts/GP	LB/GP	PIM/GP
2011	Toronto Rock	8	1	4	5	44	0	0.63	5.50	0.00	3	1	0	1	14	2	0.33	4.67	0.67
2012	Toronto Rock	8	1	3	4	45	9	0.50	5.63	1.13	2	0	0	0	9	2	0.00	4.50	1.00
2013	Buffalo Bandits	16	3	1	4	67	11	0.25	4.19	0.69	–	–	–	–	–	–	–	–	–
2014	Buffalo Bandits	14	1	6	7	72	4	0.50	5.14	0.29	–	–	–	–	–	–	–	–	–
2015	Toronto Rock	6	0	1	1	22	6	0.17	3.67	1.00	–	–	–	–	–	–	–	–	–
2016	Toronto Rock	3	0	0	0	11	0	0.00	3.67	0.00	–	–	–	–	–	–	–	–	–
		55	6	15	21	261	30	0.38	4.75	0.55	5	1	0	1	23	4	0.20	4.60	0.80
Career Total:		60	7	15	22	284	34	0.37	4.73	0.57									

GP–Games played; G–Goals; A–Assists; Pts–Points; LB–Loose balls; PIM–Penalty minutes; Pts/GP–Points per games played; LB/GP–Loose balls per games played; PIM/GP–Penalty minutes per games played.
