= Alex Crepinsek =

Canadian lacrosse player (born 1989)

Personal information
- Nationality: Canadian
- Born: February 18, 1989 (age 36)
- Height: 5 ft 11 in (180 cm)
- Weight: 170 lb (77 kg; 12 st 2 lb)

Sport
- Position: Transition
- Shoots: Right
- NLL draft: 10th overall, 2012; Minnesota Swarm
- NLL team: Georgia Swarm
- CLA team Former teams: Oakville Rock; Langley Thunder; Ajax Rock
- Pro career: 2013–2020

Alex Crepinsek (born February 18, 1989) is a professional lacrosse player with the Georgia Swarm of the National Lacrosse League and the Oakville Rock of Major Series Lacrosse. Hailing from Oakville, Ontario, Crepinsek began his Canadian amateur career with the Jr. B Oakville Buzz in 2006, with whom he won a Founders Cup. He moved up to the Jr. A Burlington Chiefs in 2007 and played for the Chiefs through 2010. Crepinsek was drafted 23rd overall in the 2011 MSL Draft by the Ajax Rock and made his debut for the Rock that summer. He moved on to play for the Langley Thunder of the Western Lacrosse Association in 2013, and returned to the Rock, now based in Oakville, in 2014. Crepinsek attended St. Thomas Aquinas Catholic Secondary School in Oakville and went on to play lacrosse at the Rochester Institute of Technology, with whom he won three conference championships.

Crepinsek was drafted with the last pick in the first round of the 2012 NLL Draft, and played all 16 games during his rookie season, collecting a Swarm rookie record of 18 loose balls in the process. He was re-signed to a two-year contract extension after his rookie campaign.
