= Nolan Heavenor =

Canadian lacrosse player

Personal information
- Nationality: Canadian
- Born: June 30, 1982 (age 43) Victoria, BC, CAN
- Height: 5 ft 7 in (170 cm)
- Weight: 185 lb (84 kg; 13 st 3 lb)

Sport
- Position: transition
- Shoots: right
- NLL draft: 17th overall, 2005; Minnesota Swarm.
- NLL team: Calgary Roughnecks
- Pro career: 2006–2013

Nolan Heavenor (born June 30, 1982 in Victoria, British Columbia) is Canadian a former professional box lacrosse transition player for the Calgary Roughnecks and Minnesota Swarm of the National Lacrosse League. He was drafted 17th overall by the Minnesota Swarm in the 2005 NLL Entry Draft from Limestone College (NCAA Division II). After playing his first season in 2006 for Minnesota, he was traded to the Calgary Roughnecks in exchange for a 2nd round (23rd overall) pick and 3rd round (31st overall) pick in the 2006 NLL Entry Draft.

Heavenor was part of three championship teams: 2009 NLL Champion's Cup with the Roughnecks, 2005 Western Lacrosse Association Mann Cup with the Victoria Shamrocks and the 2002 NCAA Division II Championship with Limestone College.
