= Kyle Rubisch =

Canadian lacrosse player

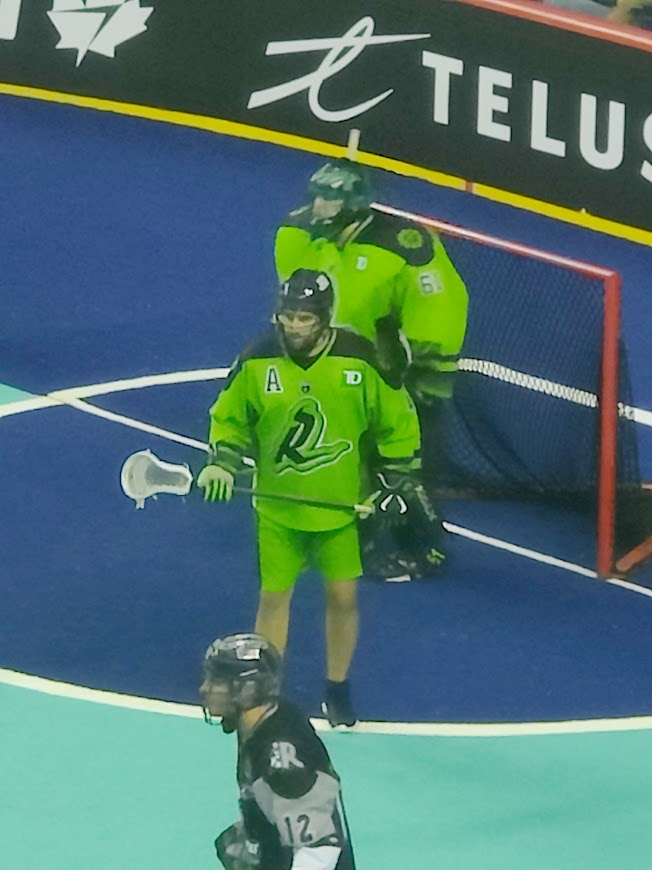
- Rubisch with the Saskatchewan Rush in 2022

Personal information
- Born: August 29, 1988 (age 37) Brampton, Ontario, Canada
- Height: 6 ft 2 in (188 cm)
- Weight: 225 lb (102 kg; 16 st 1 lb)

Sport
- Position: Defense
- Shoots: Right
- NLL draft: 2nd overall, 2010; Boston Blazers
- NLL team Former teams: San Diego Seals; Boston Blazers; Saskatchewan Rush
- MLL teams: Hamilton Nationals
- MSL team: Brooklin Redmen
- Pro career: 2010–

Kyle Rubisch (born August 29, 1988) is a Canadian professional lacrosse player for the San Diego Seals of the National Lacrosse League (NLL).

== College and Club career ==
Rubisch is a graduate from Dowling College. During his tenure there, he was named to the 2010 Eastern College Athletic Conference (ECAC) All-Star Team and was a First Team All American. He has also received several accolades with his hometown team, the Brampton Excelsiors of Major Series Lacrosse.

== Professional career ==
Rubisch was the 2nd overall draft pick, going to the Boston Blazers in the 2010 NLL Entry Draft. In his rookie season Rubisch headed the Blazers defense recording a team-high 143 loose balls and 20 forced turnovers. Rubisch also netted his first NLL goal against Rochester on April 2. No surprise that after the season, Rubisch was named to NLL All-Rookie Team.

In August 2011, the Blazers announced that they would be suspending operations, and a dispersal draft was held. Rubisch was picked second overall by the Edmonton Rush. Rubisch was named the NLL Defensive Player of the year in 2012, 2013, and 2014.

Heading into the 2023 NLL season, Inside Lacrosse named Rubisch the #6 best defender in the NLL.

Ahead of the 2024 season, Rubisch was traded to the San Diego Seals.

== International career ==
Rubisch also represented Canada on the 2011 FIL World Indoor Lacrosse Championship in Prague. He helped his team to win gold medals and he was also named to tournament All-Star Team.

== Statistics ==
=== NLL ===
Kyle Rubisch		Regular season									Playoffs								
Season	Team	GP	G	A	Pts	LB	PIM	Pts/GP	LB/GP	PIM/GP	GP	G	A	Pts	LB	PIM	Pts/GP	LB/GP	PIM/GP
2011	Boston Blazers	16	1	3	4	143	36	0.25	8.94	2.25	1	0	0	0	12	2	0.00	12.00	2.00
2012	Edmonton Rush	16	4	6	10	151	18	0.63	9.44	1.13	3	0	0	0	16	2	0.00	5.33	0.67
2013	Edmonton Rush	16	3	8	11	128	38	0.69	8.00	2.38	1	0	1	1	6	2	1.00	6.00	2.00
2014	Edmonton Rush	18	2	7	9	156	25	0.50	8.67	1.39	2	0	2	2	19	4	1.00	9.50	2.00
2015	Edmonton Rush	18	1	5	6	118	23	0.33	6.56	1.28	4	0	1	1	24	0	0.25	6.00	0.00
2016	Saskatchewan Rush	18	3	4	7	133	22	0.39	7.39	1.22	4	0	2	2	30	0	0.50	7.50	0.00
2017	Saskatchewan Rush	16	0	7	7	103	34	0.44	6.44	2.13	4	0	1	1	22	0	0.25	5.50	0.00
2018	Saskatchewan Rush	17	1	8	9	130	10	0.53	7.65	0.59	4	0	2	2	23	2	0.50	5.75	0.50
2019	Saskatchewan Rush	18	2	6	8	144	18	0.44	8.00	1.00	1	0	0	0	8	2	0.00	8.00	2.00
2020	Saskatchewan Rush	10	2	6	8	92	10	0.80	9.20	1.00	–	–	–	–	–	–	–	–	–
2022	Saskatchewan Rush	18	2	3	5	148	10	0.28	8.22	0.56	–	–	–	–	–	–	–	–	–
2023	Saskatchewan Rush	18	1	7	8	123	4	0.44	6.83	0.22	–	–	–	–	–	–	–	–	–
2024	San Diego Seals	18	0	2	2	125	12	0.11	6.94	0.67	3	0	0	0	22	4	0.00	7.33	1.33
2025	San Diego Seals	0	0	0	0	0	0	0.00	0.00	0.00	–	–	–	–	–	–	–	–	–
		217	22	72	94	1,694	260	0.43	7.81	1.20	27	0	9	9	182	18	0.33	6.74	0.67
Career Total:		244	22	81	103	1,876	278	0.42	7.69	1.14									

GP–Games played; G–Goals; A–Assists; Pts–Points; LB–Loose balls; PIM–Penalty minutes; Pts/GP–Points per games played; LB/GP–Loose balls per games played; PIM/GP–Penalty minutes per games played.

== Awards ==
Preceded by Pat McCready	NLL Defensive Player of the Year; 2012, 2013, 2014, 2015	Succeeded by Ryan Dilks
