= Andrew Turner (lacrosse) =

Canadian lacrosse player

Personal information
- Nickname(s): Andy, Turns
- Nationality: Canada
- Born: January 11, 1978 (age 47) Beamsville, Ontario, Canada
- Height: 6 ft 1 in (185 cm)
- Weight: 195 lb (88 kg; 13 st 13 lb)

Sport
- Position: Defense
- Shoots: Left
- NLL draft: 9th overall, 1998; Rochester Knighthawks
- NLL team Former teams: Edmonton Rush; Rochester Knighthawks
- Pro career: 2000–2007

Andrew Turner (born January 11, 1978) is a lacrosse player for the Edmonton Rush in the National Lacrosse League.

He plays for the Victoria Shamrocks in the Western Lacrosse Association during the summer. He has been named Best Defensive Player three times in 2001, 2003, and in 2005. In 2003 he was named Playoff MVP and also won the Mike Kelly Memorial Trophy as the Mann Cup MVP. He is a two-time Mann Cup champion. In 2007 he made his fourth appearance in the NLL All-star game.

== Statistics ==
=== NLL ===
		Regular Season						Playoffs
Season	Team	GP	G	A	Pts	LB	PIM	GP	G	A	Pts	LB	PIM
2000	Rochester	4	0	2	2	12	6	--	--	--	--	--	--
2001	Rochester	12	2	4	6	50	44	1	0	1	1	7	0
2002	Rochester	16	2	8	10	87	41	2	0	0	0	10	2
2003	Rochester	16	4	6	10	78	38	2	0	1	1	12	2
2004	Rochester	12	1	10	11	63	14	1	0	0	0	5	0
2005	Rochester	16	0	13	13	80	28	2	2	1	3	8	8
2006	Edmonton	16	1	5	6	95	32	--	--	--	--	--	--
2007	Edmonton	16	1	6	7	71	34	--	--	--	--	--	--
NLL totals		108	11	54	65	536	237	8	2	3	5	42	12

== Awards ==
Preceded by Cam Woods, Taylor Wray	NLL Defensive Player of the Year; 2005	Succeeded by Brodie Merrill
