= Cam Woods =

Canadian lacrosse player (born 1976)

Personal information
- Nationality: Canadian
- Born: April 27, 1976 (age 49) Montreal, Quebec
- Height: 6 ft 3 in (191 cm)
- Weight: 205 lb (93 kg; 14 st 9 lb)

Sport
- Position: Defense
- Shoots: Left
- NLL draft: 18th overall, 1997; Boston Blazers
- NLL team Former teams: Toronto Rock; Chicago Shamrox; San Jose Stealth; Albany Attack
- Pro career: 2000–2014

Cam Woods (born April 27, 1976 in Montreal, Quebec) is a former professional lacrosse player for the Toronto Rock and current assistant coach and defensive coordinator for the San Diego Seals of the National Lacrosse League. Woods tied with Taylor Wray for the Defensive Player of the Year Award in 2004, and was a 4 time all star (2002, 2004, 2007, 2009). Woods was named as the captain in his second season with the Albany Attack and then served as team captain for the next 7 seasons (3 Albany, 3 San Jose, 1 Chicago) before being traded to the Rock. Woods won his first NLL champions cup in 2011 with the Toronto Rock, to go along with his 2 Mann cups (2000 Brooklin Redmen, 2008 Brampton Excelsiors). Cam is a father of two children, Avalyn and Marchel Woods.

Woods announced his retirement from the NLL shortly before the 2014 NLL season, then came out of retirement to sign a practice roster agreement with the Toronto Rock on March 20, 2014.

Woods represented Canada playing in the World Indoor games, the Heritage Cup, and at the World Field Lacrosse Championships in Perth, Australia.

== Statistics ==
=== NLL ===
Cam Woods		Regular season									Playoffs								
Season	Team	GP	G	A	Pts	LB	PIM	Pts/GP	LB/GP	PIM/GP	GP	G	A	Pts	LB	PIM	Pts/GP	LB/GP	PIM/GP
2000	Albany Attack	12	2	12	14	99	18	1.17	8.25	1.50	–	–	–	–	–	–	–	–	–
2001	Albany Attack	14	12	7	19	154	43	1.36	11.00	3.07	–	–	–	–	–	–	–	–	–
2002	Albany Attack	16	8	15	23	113	44	1.44	7.06	2.75	2	1	2	3	20	4	1.50	10.00	2.00
2003	Albany Attack	16	4	10	14	119	26	0.88	7.44	1.63	–	–	–	–	–	–	–	–	–
2004	San Jose Stealth	16	6	13	19	111	48	1.19	6.94	3.00	1	0	2	2	5	0	2.00	5.00	0.00
2005	San Jose Stealth	16	6	3	9	109	30	0.56	6.81	1.88	–	–	–	–	–	–	–	–	–
2006	San Jose Stealth	16	2	10	12	94	20	0.75	5.88	1.25	–	–	–	–	–	–	–	–	–
2007	Chicago Shamrox	16	5	15	20	122	50	1.25	7.63	3.13	–	–	–	–	–	–	–	–	–
2008	Toronto Rock	14	6	12	18	81	78	1.29	5.79	5.57	–	–	–	–	–	–	–	–	–
2009	Toronto Rock	13	0	5	5	74	26	0.38	5.69	2.00	–	–	–	–	–	–	–	–	–
2010	Toronto Rock	9	3	3	6	45	4	0.67	5.00	0.44	2	0	1	1	10	2	0.50	5.00	1.00
2011	Toronto Rock	14	0	3	3	95	5	0.21	6.79	0.36	3	0	1	1	12	4	0.33	4.00	1.33
2012	Toronto Rock	16	2	5	7	72	6	0.44	4.50	0.38	2	0	0	0	7	0	0.00	3.50	0.00
2013	Toronto Rock	15	1	4	5	64	12	0.33	4.27	0.80	1	0	0	0	1	0	0.00	1.00	0.00
2014	Toronto Rock	4	0	1	1	19	4	0.25	4.75	1.00	1	0	0	0	6	4	0.00	6.00	4.00
		207	57	118	175	1,371	414	0.85	6.62	2.00	12	1	6	7	61	14	0.58	5.08	1.17
Career Total:		219	58	124	182	1,432	428	0.83	6.54	1.95									

GP–Games played; G–Goals; A–Assists; Pts–Points; LB–Loose balls; PIM–Penalty minutes; Pts/GP–Points per games played; LB/GP–Loose balls per games played; PIM/GP–Penalty minutes per games played.

== Awards ==
Preceded by Jim Moss	NLL Defensive Player of the Year (tie with Taylor Wray); 2004	Succeeded by Andrew Turner
