= Jeff Cornwall =

Canadian lacrosse player

Personal information
- Nationality: Canadian
- Born: May 28, 1991 (age 35) Coquitlam, British Columbia, Canada
- Height: 6 ft 2 in (188 cm)
- Weight: 210 lb (95 kg; 15 st 0 lb)

Sport
- Position: Defense
- Shoots: Left
- NLL draft: 15th overall, 2011; Buffalo Bandits
- NLL team Former teams: Vancouver Warriors; Calgary Roughnecks; Buffalo Bandits; Edmonton Rush; Saskatchewan Rush
- Pro career: 2012–
Medal record
Representing Canada
Men's box lacrosse
World Lacrosse Box Championships
Winner	2024 Utica

Jeff Cornwall (born May 29, 1991, in Coquitlam, British Columbia) is a Canadian professional box lacrosse player for the Vancouver Warriors in the National Lacrosse League. Cornwall was drafted in the second round (15th overall) of the 2011 NLL Entry Draft by the Buffalo Bandits. His brother Travis plays for the Las Vegas Desert Dogs.

After playing five games for the Buffalo Bandits in his rookie year, Cornwall was traded to the Edmonton Rush for two second-round draft picks in the 2012 Entry Draft (Jordan Critch and Carter Bender). He was selected by the New York Riptide in the 2019 Expansion Draft. New York traded him back to the now-Saskatchewan Rush prior to the season for the 10th overall pick (Tyson Bomberry) in the 2019 draft. In the 2022 Expansion Draft, he was selected by the Las Vegas Desert Dogs. Las Vegas traded him to Calgary for Marshal King and their 1st-round pick (18th overall, Austin Hasen) in the 2022 Entry Draft.

== Statistics ==
=== NLL ===
		Regular Season					Playoffs
Season	Team	GP	G	A	Pts	PIM	GP	G	A	Pts	PIM
2012	Buffalo Bandits	5	0	1	1	0	--	--	--	--	--
2012	Edmonton Rush	13	0	3	3	2	3	0	0	0	4
2013	Edmonton Rush	16	2	7	9	0	1	1	0	1	4
2014	Edmonton Rush	18	7	6	13	10	3	0	3	3	2
2015	Edmonton Rush	16	1	1	2	4	5	2	0	2	2
2016	Saskatchewan Rush	17	6	8	14	2	4	3	1	4	0
2017	Saskatchewan Rush	18	10	16	26	4	4	1	2	3	0
2018	Saskatchewan Rush	18	2	6	8	4	4	2	1	3	2
2020	Saskatchewan Rush	7	2	2	4	0	--	--	--	--	--
2022	Saskatchewan Rush	17	7	4	11	6	--	--	--	--	--
NLL totals		145	37	54	91	32	24	9	7	16	14
