= Travis Cornwall =

Canadian lacrosse player

Personal information
- Nationality: Canadian
- Born: February 1, 1990 (age 36) Coquitlam, BC, Canada
- Height: 6 ft 2 in (188 cm)
- Weight: 210 lb (95 kg; 15 st 0 lb)

Sport
- Position: Transition
- Shoots: Left
- NLL draft: 7th overall, 2011; Calgary Roughnecks
- NLL team Former teams: Las Vegas Desert Dogs; Calgary Roughnecks; Vancouver Stealth; Saskatchewan Rush; Panther City Lacrosse Club
- Pro career: 2012–

Travis Cornwall (born February 1, 1990, in Coquitlam, British Columbia) is a Canadian professional box lacrosse player who plays for the Las Vegas Desert Dogs in the National Lacrosse League. He was drafted in the 1st round (7th overall) in the 2011 NLL Entry Draft. He won the Minto Cup with the Coquitlam Adanacs in 2010. His brother Jeff plays for the Calgary Roughnecks. On October 25, 2022, Cornwall signed with the Las Vegas Desert Dogs.

== Statistics ==
=== NLL ===
Travis Cornwall		Regular Season					Playoffs
Season	Team	GP	G	A	Pts	PIM	GP	G	A	Pts	PIM
2012	Calgary Roughnecks	12	10	4	14	4	1	0	0	0	0
2013	Calgary Roughnecks	11	3	3	6	2	2	1	2	3	0
2014	Calgary Roughnecks	10	0	4	4	4	4	0	0	0	2
2015	Calgary Roughnecks	5	0	4	4	4	--	--	--	--	--
2016	Vancouver Stealth	15	5	6	11	0	--	--	--	--	--
2017	Vancouver Stealth	11	2	1	3	4	--	--	--	--	--
2018	Vancouver Stealth	11	4	4	8	9	--	--	--	--	--
2019	Saskatchewan Rush	17	0	6	6	2	1	0	0	0	0
2020	Saskatchewan Rush	10	0	5	5	18	--	--	--	--	--
2022	Panther City LC	14	3	0	3	2	--	--	--	--	--
2023	Las Vegas Desert Dogs	5	1	1	2	2	--	--	--	--	--
NLL totals		121	28	38	66	51	8	1	2	3	2
