= Tyler Richards =

Canadian lacrosse player (born 1986)

Personal information
- Nationality: Canadian
- Born: September 22, 1986 (age 40) Coquitlam, British Columbia, Canada
- Height: 5 ft 11 in (180 cm)
- Weight: 205 lb (93 kg; 14 st 9 lb)

Sport
- Position: Goalie
- Shoots: Right
- NLL draft: 46th overall, 2007; San Jose Stealth
- NLL teams: Calgary Roughnecks, Washington Stealth, Vancouver Stealth, San Jose Stealth
- WLA team: New Westminster Salmonbellies
- Pro career: 2008–2020

Tyler Richards (born September 22, 1986 in Coquitlam, British Columbia) is a Canadian professional box lacrosse coach and former goaltender. He is the goaltending coach for the Calgary Roughnecks of the National Lacrosse League. As a player, he played for the Calgary Roughnecks, Washington Stealth, Vancouver Stealth and San Jose Stealth of the NLL as well as the New Westminster Salmonbellies of the WLA. From 2005 to 2007, he played for the Coquitlam, BC, Adanacs of the BC Junior A Lacrosse League.

== NLL career ==
Richards was drafted by the Stealth in the fourth round (46th overall) of the 2007 Entry Draft. In 2009 Richards was selected to the All-Rookie Team. In 2010 Richards was a part of the NLL Champions Washington Stealth. Richards was also part of the 2019 NLL championship team with the Calgary Roughnecks

== OLA / WLA Career ==
Richards was the co-winner of the Western Lacrosse Association Ed Bailey Trophy as Rookie of the Year. Richards also won the WLA Leo Nicholson Trophy for Outstanding Goaltender in the WLA for 2008. Tyler in his rookie season led the WLA in wins with 13 and had a .849 save percentage and goals against average of 6.35.

== Coaching ==
Richards was named assistant coach of the Calgary Roughnecks in October, 2021.
