= Jamie Rooney (lacrosse) =

Canadian lacrosse player

Personal information
- Nationality: Canadian
- Born: July 31, 1984 (age 41) Arthur, Ontario, Canada
- Height: 5 ft 10 in (178 cm)
- Weight: 185 lb (84 kg; 13 st 3 lb)

Sport
- Position: Forward
- Shoots: Right
- NLL draft: 21st overall, 2004; Buffalo Bandits
- NLL team Former teams: Buffalo Bandits; Toronto Rock; Washington Stealth; Boston Blazers; Rochester Knighthawks; New York Titans; Philadelphia Wings; Calgary Roughnecks
- OLA Sr. B team: Arthur Aces
- Pro career: 2008-2014–

Jamie Rooney (born July 31, 1984 in Arthur, Ontario) is a Canadian lacrosse player who plays for the Buffalo Bandits in the National Lacrosse League.

== Professional career ==
Rooney began his professional career with the Philadelphia Wings in the 2008 NLL season. He was drafted by the Wings in the second round (22nd overall) of the 2007 National Lacrosse League dispersal draft from the Arizona Sting. Previously, Rooney was drafted in the 2004 Entry Draft by the Buffalo Bandits, and was also signed as a free agent with the Calgary Roughnecks in 2006, but never appeared in a game for either team

Prior to the 2009 NLL season, Rooney was acquired by the New York Titans in the 2008 dispersal draft. He played in ten games for the Titans before being traded to Rochester for Bill Greer. Midway through the 2010 season, Rooney was traded again, this time to the Boston Blazers.

The Blazers ceased operations following the 2011 season, and a dispersal draft was held. Rooney was taken in the first round (8th overall) by the Washington Stealth. Rooney was subsequently released by the Stealth, and then signed by the Toronto Rock.

== Statistics ==
=== NLL ===
Jamie Rooney		Regular season									Playoffs								
Season	Team	GP	G	A	Pts	LB	PIM	Pts/GP	LB/GP	PIM/GP	GP	G	A	Pts	LB	PIM	Pts/GP	LB/GP	PIM/GP
2008	Philadelphia Wings	15	20	23	43	59	12	2.87	3.93	0.80	1	3	1	4	4	0	4.00	4.00	0.00
2009	New York Titans	10	7	7	14	30	4	1.40	3.00	0.40	–	–	–	–	–	–	–	–	–
2009	Rochester Knighthawks	7	5	3	8	16	6	1.14	2.29	0.86	1	1	1	2	0	0	2.00	0.00	0.00
2010	Rochester Knighthawks	1	0	0	0	2	0	0.00	2.00	0.00	–	–	–	–	–	–	–	–	–
2010	Boston Blazers	7	10	11	21	41	2	3.00	5.86	0.29	1	2	1	3	1	0	3.00	1.00	0.00
2011	Boston Blazers	16	15	9	24	37	6	1.50	2.31	0.38	1	2	1	3	1	0	3.00	1.00	0.00
2012	Toronto Rock	10	8	6	14	34	2	1.40	3.40	0.20	–	–	–	–	–	–	–	–	–
2013	Buffalo Bandits	3	3	4	7	6	2	2.33	2.00	0.67	–	–	–	–	–	–	–	–	–
2014	Buffalo Bandits	11	8	13	21	32	4	1.91	2.91	0.36	3	3	1	4	2	2	1.33	0.67	0.67
		80	76	76	152	257	38	1.90	3.21	0.48	7	11	5	16	8	2	2.29	1.14	0.29
Career Total:		87	87	81	168	265	40	1.93	3.05	0.46									

GP–Games played; G–Goals; A–Assists; Pts–Points; LB–Loose balls; PIM–Penalty minutes; Pts/GP–Points per games played; LB/GP–Loose balls per games played; PIM/GP–Penalty minutes per games played.
