= Paul Dawson (lacrosse) =

Brother of Dan Dawson

Personal information
- Nationality: Canadian
- Born: September 16, 1985 (age 40) Oakville, Ontario, Canada
- Height: 6 ft 5 in (196 cm)
- Weight: 225 lb (102 kg; 16 st 1 lb)

Sport
- Position: Defense
- NLL draft: 7th overall, 2006; San Jose Stealth
- NLL team Former teams: Buffalo Bandits; Colorado Mammoth; Rochester Knighthawks; San Diego Seals; Rochester Knighthawks (1995-2019); Philadelphia Wings; San Jose Stealth; Boston Blazers
- Pro career: 2007–

Paul Dawson (born September 16, 1985) is a Canadian box lacrosse player who plays defense for the Buffalo Bandits. His older brother Dan, played for the Toronto Rock.

Dawson was drafted as a goaltender in the first round (7th overall) in the 2006 National Lacrosse League entry draft. As a goaltender, Dawson played with the Brampton Excelsiors in the Senior A Major Series Lacrosse League. The San Jose Stealth converted him from a goaltender to a defenseman starting with the 2008 NLL season. He was then traded to the Boston Blazers, where he played two seasons with his brother Dan.

In 2010, Dawson was traded to the Calgary Roughnecks, who subsequently traded him to the Philadelphia Wings. A year later, Dawson was reunited with his brother when Dan Dawson was acquired in the Boston Blazers dispersal draft. Both Dawsons played one season in Philadelphia before being traded together to the Rochester Knighthawks for a package of four players including Paul Rabil. Paul Dawson remained in Rochester until being traded to the San Diego Seals during the middle of the 2019 season. The following season he returned to Rochester, joining the newly formed Rochester Knighthawks, after the original Knighthawks franchise moved to Canada becoming the Halifax Thunderbirds. After 3 seasons Paul became a free agent and was signed by the Colorado Mammoth for the 2024 season.

== Statistics ==
=== NLL ===
		Regular Season						Playoffs
Season	Team	GP	G	A	Pts	LB	PIM	GP	G	A	Pts	LB	PIM
2007	San Jose Stealth	2	0	0	0	0	0	--	--	--	--	--	--
2008	San Jose Stealth	15	0	5	5	31	22	1	1	1	2	3	0
2009	Boston Blazers	16	3	9	12	50	31	1	0	0	0	1	0
2010	Boston Blazers	16	2	4	6	75	65	1	0	0	0	7	0
2011	Philadelphia Wings	16	5	9	14	50	35	--	--	--	--	--	--
2012	Philadelphia Wings	16	0	6	6	53	67	1	0	0	0	3	0
2013	Rochester Knighthawks	16	1	0	1	38	34	3	1	0	1	9	2
2014	Rochester Knighthawks	18	2	3	5	61	29	6	1	1	2	14	8
2015	Rochester Knighthawks	17	3	3	6	59	73	4	0	0	0	10	0
2016	Rochester Knighthawks	13	1	4	5	52	18	--	--	--	--	--	--
2017	Rochester Knighthawks	18	3	3	6	62	30	--	--	--	--	--	--
2018	Rochester Knighthawks	18	3	7	10	71	29	5	0	4	4	15	0
2019	Rochester Knighthawks	10	0	3	3	34	18	--	--	--	--	--	--
2019	San Diego Seals	8	0	0	0	25	4	1	0	0	0	4	0
2020	Rochester Knighthawks	12	2	4	6	64	29	--	--	--	--	--	--
2022	Rochester Knighthawks	18	0	2	2	65	72	--	--	--	--	--	--
2023	Rochester Knighthawks	18	2	5	7	74	28	1	0	0	0	3	0
2024	Colorado Mammoth	13	0	2	2	47	29	--	--	--	--	--	--
2024	Buffalo Bandits	6	0	0	0	18	4	5	0	1	1	13	4
2025	Buffalo Bandits	18	0	2	2	60	18	6	0	0	0	17	4
2026	Buffalo Bandits	18	0	2	2	59	12	1	0	0	0	1	2
NLL totals		314	29	75	104	1,080	653	36	3	7	10	100	20

== Awards ==
- 4x NLL champion (2013, 2014, 2024, 2025)
