= 2002 Toronto Rock season =

2002 Toronto Rock
- Champion's Cup Champions
- Northern Division Champions
- League: NLL
- Division: 1st Northern
- 2002 record: 11-5
- Home record: 8-0
- Road record: 3-5
- Goals for: 223
- Goals against: 176
- General Manager: Les Bartley
- Coach: Les Bartley
- Captain: Jim Veltman
- Arena: Air Canada Centre
- Average attendance: 15,689

Team leaders
- Goals: Colin Doyle (47)
- Assists: Blaine Manning (50)
- Points: Colin Doyle (80)
- Penalties in minutes: Pat Coyle (60)
- Loose Balls: Jim Veltman (203)
- Wins: Bob Watson (9)
- Goals against average: Anthony Cosmo (10.55)

The Toronto Rock are a lacrosse team based in Toronto playing in the National Lacrosse League (NLL). The 2002 season was the 5th in franchise history and 4th as the Rock.

The Rock continued its dynasty on top of the NLL standings, finishing first in its division for the fourth straight year. The Rock beat the Washington Power in the semifinals, to advance to the championship game against the Albany Attack. Their victory in this game gave the Rock three out of the last four championships.

== Regular season ==
=== Conference standings ===
Central Division
P	Team	GP	W	L	PCT	GB	Home	Road	GF	GA	Diff	GF/GP	GA/GP
1	Albany Attack – xyz	16	14	2	.875	0.0	7–1	7–1	252	194	+58	15.75	12.12
2	Rochester Knighthawks – x	16	13	3	.812	1.0	8–0	5–3	261	202	+59	16.31	12.62
3	Montreal Express	16	8	8	.500	6.0	4–4	4–4	237	227	+10	14.81	14.19
4	Buffalo Bandits	16	8	8	.500	6.0	4–4	4–4	210	215	−5	13.12	13.44
5	Columbus Landsharks	16	5	11	.312	9.0	2–6	3–5	198	230	−32	12.38	14.38

East Division
P	Team	GP	W	L	PCT	GB	Home	Road	GF	GA	Diff	GF/GP	GA/GP
1	Washington Power – xy	16	9	7	.562	0.0	6–2	3–5	253	243	+10	15.81	15.19
2	Philadelphia Wings – x	16	8	8	.500	1.0	6–2	2–6	222	237	−15	13.88	14.81
3	New York Saints	16	5	11	.312	4.0	2–6	3–5	200	249	−49	12.50	15.56
4	New Jersey Storm	16	5	11	.312	4.0	3–5	2–6	178	232	−54	11.12	14.50

North Division
P	Team	GP	W	L	PCT	GB	Home	Road	GF	GA	Diff	GF/GP	GA/GP
1	Toronto Rock – xy	16	11	5	.688	0.0	8–0	3–5	223	176	+47	13.94	11.00
2	Vancouver Ravens – x	16	10	6	.625	1.0	6–2	4–4	236	192	+44	14.75	12.00
3	Calgary Roughnecks	16	4	12	.250	7.0	2–6	2–6	224	264	−40	14.00	16.50
4	Ottawa Rebel	16	4	12	.250	7.0	1–7	3–5	202	245	−43	12.62	15.31

x: Clinched playoff berth; c: Clinched playoff berth by crossing over to another division; y: Clinched division; z: Clinched best regular season record; GP: Games Played
W: Wins; L: Losses; GB: Games back; PCT: Win percentage; Home: Record at Home; Road: Record on the Road; GF: Goals scored; GA: Goals allowed
Differential: Difference between goals scored and allowed; GF/GP: Average number of goals scored per game; GA/GP: Average number of goals allowed per game

=== Game log ===
Game	Date	Opponent	Location	Score	OT	Attendance	Record
1	November 17, 2001	Vancouver Ravens	Air Canada Centre	W 16–11		13,049	1–0
2	December 1, 2001	@ Vancouver Ravens	GM Place	L 12–13		13,772	1–1
3	December 14, 2001	Ottawa Rebel	Air Canada Centre	W 12–6		14,169	2–1
4	January 5, 2002	@ Washington Power	Capital Centre	L 11–12		3,512	2–2
5	January 12, 2002	@ Calgary Roughnecks	Pengrowth Saddledome	W 15–12		9,428	3–2
6	February 26, 2002	Rochester Knighthawks	Air Canada Centre	W 14–9		18,543	4–2
7	February 3, 2002	Montreal Express	Air Canada Centre	W 17–12		14,515	5–2
8	February 10, 2002	Washington Power	Air Canada Centre	W 17–14		13,802	6–2
9	February 16, 2002	@ Ottawa Rebel	Corel Centre	W 15–8		7,826	7–2
10	February 23, 2002	Calgary Roughnecks	Air Canada Centre	W 14–13	OT	17,138	8–2
11	March 2, 2002	@ Buffalo Bandits	HSBC Arena	W 8–7		7,948	9–2
12	March 8, 2002	@ Montreal Express	Molson Centre	L 9–15		9,339	9–3
13	March 15, 2002	New York Saints	Air Canada Centre	W 21–7		16,796	10–3
14	March 16, 2002	@ Rochester Knighthawks	Blue Cross Arena	L 14–16		10,481	10–4
15	March 22, 2002	Philadelphia Wings	Air Canada Centre	W 17–9		17,501	11–4
16	March 23, 2002	@ Philadelphia Wings	First Union Center	L 11–12	OT	14,361	11–5

== Playoffs ==
=== Game log ===
Game	Date	Opponent	Location	Score	OT	Attendance	Record
Semifinals	April 5, 2002	Washington Power	Air Canada Centre	W 12–11	2OT	14,442	1–0
Championship Game	April 13, 2002	@ Albany Attack	Pepsi Arena	W 13–12		9,289	2–0

== Player stats ==
=== Runners (Top 10) ===
Note: GP = Games played; G = Goals; A = Assists; Pts = Points; LB = Loose Balls; PIM = Penalty minutes

Player	GP	G	A	Pts	LB	PIM
Colin Doyle	16	47	33	80	58	17
Blaine Manning	16	21	50	71	109	13
Steve Toll	16	26	39	65	125	11
Dan Stroup	16	37	23	60	86	12
Kim Squire	16	27	28	55	57	54
Jim Veltman	16	16	37	53	203	22
Ken Millin	14	11	12	23	40	2
Mike Murray	10	10	9	19	19	6
Darryl Gibson	15	3	15	18	84	12
Glenn Clark	16	10	7	17	98	19
Totals		223	298	521	1290	360

=== Goaltenders ===
Note: GP = Games played; MIN = Minutes; W = Wins; L = Losses; GA = Goals against; Sv% = Save percentage; GAA = Goals against average

Player	GP	MIN	W	L	GA	Sv%	GAA
Bob Watson	12	681:21	9	3	131	.764	11.54
Anthony Cosmo	6	255:56	2	2	45	.791	10.55
Totals			11	5	176	.772	10.94

== Awards ==
Player	Award
Blaine Manning	Rookie of the Year Award
Pat Coyle	Defensive Player of the Year Award
Jim Veltman	Sportsmanship Award
Colin Doyle	Championship Game MVP
Blaine Manning	Rookie of the Month, March
Pat Coyle	First All-Pro Team
Colin Doyle	Second All-Pro Team
Blaine Manning	All-Rookie Team
Colin Doyle	All-Stars
Pat Coyle	All-Stars
Jim Veltman	All-Stars
Bob Watson	All-Stars
Steve Toll	All-Stars

== Roster ==
No.		Position	Player
26	(Canada)	Fwd	Burke, Wayne
25		??	Candy, Drew
5	(Canada)	Fwd	Chapman, Sandy
11	(Canada)	Def	Clark, Glenn
2	(Canada)	Def	Coyle, Pat
44	(Canada)	Goalie	Cosmo, Anthony
7	(Canada)	Fwd	Doyle, Colin
19	(Canada)	Def	Gibson, Darryl
6	(Canada)	Def	Ladouceur, Dan
4	(Canada)	Def	Livingstone, Carter

No.		Position	Player
16	(Canada)	Fwd	Manning, Blaine
33	(Canada)	Fwd	Millin, Ken
18	(Canada)	Fwd	Murray, Mike
40	(Canada)	Def	Rubel, Ian
93	(Canada)	Fwd	Squire, Kim
34	(Canada)	Def	Squire, Rodd
8	(Canada)	Fwd	Stroup, Dan
17	(Canada)	Def	Toll, Steve
32	(Canada)	Fwd	Veltman, Jim
29	(Canada)	Goalie	Watson, Bob

== See also ==
- 2002 NLL season
