= 2003 Toronto Rock season =

Lacrosse team season

2003 Toronto Rock
- Champion's Cup Champions
- Northern Division Champions
- League: NLL
- Division: 1st Northern
- 2003 record: 11–5
- Home record: 6–2
- Road record: 5–3
- Goals for: 195
- Goals against: 164
- General Manager: Les Bartley
- Coach: Les Bartley
- Captain: Jim Veltman
- Arena: Air Canada Centre
- Average attendance: 16,733

Team leaders
- Goals: Blaine Manning (40)
- Assists: Colin Doyle (55)
- Points: Colin Doyle (94)
- Penalties in minutes: Dan Ladouceur (54)
- Loose Balls: Jim Veltman (207)
- Wins: Bob Watson (6)
- Goals against average: Bob Watson (10.06)

The Toronto Rock are a lacrosse team based in Toronto playing in the National Lacrosse League (NLL). The 2003 season was the 6th in franchise history and 5th as the Rock.

The Rock continued its dynasty on top of the NLL standings, finishing first in its division for the fifth straight year. The Rock beat the Colorado Mammoth in the semifinals, to advance to the championship game against the Rochester Knighthawks. Their victory in this game gave the Rock two consecutive championships, and four out of five years.

== Regular season ==
=== Conference standings ===
Central Division
| P | Team | GP | W | L | PCT | GB | Home | Road | GF | GA | Diff | GF/GP | GA/GP |
|---|---|---|---|---|---|---|---|---|---|---|---|---|---|
| 1 | Rochester Knighthawks – xyz | 16 | 12 | 4 | .750 | 0.0 | 6–2 | 6–2 | 214 | 173 | +41 | 13.38 | 10.81 |
| 2 | Buffalo Bandits – x | 16 | 12 | 4 | .750 | 0.0 | 8–0 | 4–4 | 231 | 188 | +43 | 14.44 | 11.75 |
| 3 | Albany Attack | 16 | 8 | 8 | .500 | 4.0 | 4–4 | 4–4 | 198 | 191 | +7 | 12.38 | 11.94 |
| 4 | Columbus Landsharks | 16 | 8 | 8 | .500 | 4.0 | 4–4 | 4–4 | 184 | 203 | −19 | 11.50 | 12.69 |

East Division
| P | Team | GP | W | L | PCT | GB | Home | Road | GF | GA | Diff | GF/GP | GA/GP |
|---|---|---|---|---|---|---|---|---|---|---|---|---|---|
| 1 | Colorado Mammoth – xy | 16 | 9 | 7 | .562 | 0.0 | 6–2 | 3–5 | 226 | 223 | +3 | 14.12 | 13.94 |
| 2 | Philadelphia Wings | 16 | 8 | 8 | .500 | 1.0 | 6–2 | 2–6 | 203 | 209 | −6 | 12.69 | 13.06 |
| 3 | New York Saints | 16 | 3 | 13 | .188 | 6.0 | 2–6 | 1–7 | 198 | 239 | −41 | 12.38 | 14.94 |
| 4 | New Jersey Storm | 16 | 3 | 13 | .188 | 6.0 | 3–5 | 0–8 | 187 | 220 | −33 | 11.69 | 13.75 |

North Division
| P | Team | GP | W | L | PCT | GB | Home | Road | GF | GA | Diff | GF/GP | GA/GP |
|---|---|---|---|---|---|---|---|---|---|---|---|---|---|
| 1 | Toronto Rock – xy | 16 | 11 | 5 | .688 | 0.0 | 6–2 | 5–3 | 195 | 164 | +31 | 12.19 | 10.25 |
| 2 | Calgary Roughnecks – x | 16 | 9 | 7 | .562 | 2.0 | 6–2 | 3–5 | 209 | 207 | +2 | 13.06 | 12.94 |
| 3 | Vancouver Ravens – x | 16 | 9 | 7 | .562 | 2.0 | 5–3 | 4–4 | 208 | 196 | +12 | 13.00 | 12.25 |
| 4 | Ottawa Rebel | 16 | 4 | 12 | .250 | 7.0 | 3–5 | 1–7 | 174 | 214 | −40 | 10.88 | 13.38 |

x: Clinched playoff berth; c: Clinched playoff berth by crossing over to another division; y: Clinched division; z: Clinched best regular season record; GP: Games Played
W: Wins; L: Losses; GB: Games back; PCT: Win percentage; Home: Record at Home; Road: Record on the Road; GF: Goals scored; GA: Goals allowed
Differential: Difference between goals scored and allowed; GF/GP: Average number of goals scored per game; GA/GP: Average number of goals allowed per game

=== Game log ===
| Game | Date | Opponent | Location | Score | OT | Attendance | Record |
|---|---|---|---|---|---|---|---|
| 1 | December 27, 2002 | @ Albany Attack | Pepsi Arena | W 13–9 | | 5,179 | 1–0 |
| 2 | January 3, 2003 | @ Colorado Mammoth | Pepsi Center | L 12–13 | 2OT | 16,125 | 1–1 |
| 3 | January 11, 2003 | Albany Attack | Air Canada Centre | L 9–12 | | 17,059 | 1–2 |
| 4 | January 17, 2003 | @ Calgary Roughnecks | Pengrowth Saddledome | W 13–10 | | 11,333 | 2–2 |
| 5 | January 23, 2003 | @ Ottawa Rebel | Ottawa Civic Centre | W 15–6 | | 2,794 | 3–2 |
| 6 | January 24, 2003 | Buffalo Bandits | Air Canada Centre | W 17–13 | | 15,221 | 4–2 |
| 7 | February 1, 2003 | @ Philadelphia Wings | First Union Center | W 13–9 | | 13,585 | 5–2 |
| 8 | February 7, 2003 | Ottawa Rebel | Air Canada Centre | W 13–10 | | 16,059 | 6–2 |
| 9 | February 8, 2003 | @ Buffalo Bandits | HSBC Arena | L 8–14 | | 8,414 | 6–3 |
| 10 | February 14, 2003 | @ Vancouver Ravens | GM Place | W 13–10 | | 7,594 | 7–3 |
| 11 | February 22, 2003 | Rochester Knighthawks | Air Canada Centre | W 11–10 | | 18,209 | 8–3 |
| 12 | February 28, 2003 | Calgary Roughnecks | Air Canada Centre | W 15–6 | | 16,169 | 9–3 |
| 13 | March 7, 2003 | Vancouver Ravens | Air Canada Centre | W 11–7 | | 15,723 | 10–3 |
| 14 | March 14, 2003 | @ Rochester Knighthawks | Blue Cross Arena | L 10–13 | | 9,112 | 10–4 |
| 15 | March 21, 2003 | Philadelphia Wings | Air Canada Centre | W 12–9 | | 17,539 | 11–4 |
| 16 | April 13, 2003 | Colorado Mammoth | Air Canada Centre | L 10–13 | | 17,888 | 11–5 |

== Playoffs ==
=== Game log ===
| Game | Date | Opponent | Location | Score | OT | Attendance | Record |
|---|---|---|---|---|---|---|---|
| Semifinals | April 26, 2003 | Colorado Mammoth | Air Canada Centre | W 15–11 | | 16,733 | 1–0 |
| Championship Game | May 3, 2003 | @ Rochester Knighthawks | Blue Cross Arena | W 8–6 | | 11,051 | 2–0 |

== Player stats ==
=== Runners (Top 10) ===
Note: GP = Games played; G = Goals; A = Assists; Pts = Points; LB = Loose Balls; PIM = Penalty Minutes

| Player | GP | G | A | Pts | LB | PIM |
|---|---|---|---|---|---|---|
| Colin Doyle | 16 | 39 | 55 | 94 | 63 | 16 |
| Blaine Manning | 16 | 40 | 38 | 78 | 78 | 13 |
| Jim Veltman | 16 | 16 | 43 | 59 | 207 | 12 |
| Kevin Finneran | 16 | 25 | 30 | 55 | 51 | 6 |
| Steve Toll | 16 | 27 | 26 | 53 | 91 | 2 |
| Aaron Wilson | 14 | 21 | 16 | 37 | 59 | 6 |
| Pat Coyle | 16 | 2 | 10 | 12 | 99 | 31 |
| Todd Richard | 6 | 5 | 5 | 10 | 7 | 0 |
| Darryl Gibson | 15 | 4 | 6 | 10 | 62 | 12 |
| Sandy Chapman | 16 | 3 | 7 | 10 | 49 | 4 |
| Totals | | 195 | 271 | 466 | 1199 | 300 |

=== Goaltenders ===
Note: GP = Games played; MIN = Minutes; W = Wins; L = Losses; GA = Goals against; Sv% = Save percentage; GAA = Goals against average

| Player | GP | MIN | W | L | GA | Sv% | GAA |
|---|---|---|---|---|---|---|---|
| Bob Watson | 10 | 602:19 | 6 | 4 | 101 | .777 | 10.06 |
| Anthony Cosmo | 6 | 359:20 | 5 | 1 | 61 | .788 | 10.19 |
| Totals | | | 11 | 5 | 164 | .779 | 10.21 |

== Awards ==
| Player | Award |
|---|---|
| Chris Driscoll | Sportsmanship Award |
| Bob Watson | Championship Game MVP |
| Aaron Wilson | Rookie of the Month, February |
| Colin Doyle | First All-Pro Team |
| Blaine Manning | Second All-Pro Team |
| Jim Veltman | Second All-Pro Team |
| Aaron Wilson | All-Rookie Team |

== Roster ==
| No. | | Position | Player |
|---|---|---|---|
| 26 | | ?? | Burke, Wayne |
| 5 | (Canada) | Fwd | Chapman, Sandy |
| 11 | (Canada) | Def | Clark, Glenn |
| 2 | (Canada) | Def | Coyle, Pat |
| 44 | (Canada) | Goalie | Cosmo, Anthony |
| 7 | (Canada) | Fwd | Doyle, Colin |
| 73 | (Canada) | Fwd | Driscoll, Chris |
| 80 | | ?? | Finneran, Kevin |
| 19 | (Canada) | Def | Gibson, Darryl |
| 12 | | ?? | Jones, Pat |
| 6 | (Canada) | Def | Ladouceur, Dan |
| 4 | | ?? | Livingstone, Carter |

| No. | | Position | Player |
|---|---|---|---|
| 89 | | ?? | Low, Jon |
| 16 | (Canada) | Fwd | Manning, Blaine |
| 9 | (Canada) | Def | Merrill, Patrick |
| 97 | | ?? | Montour, Tom |
| 27 | | ?? | Richard, Todd |
| 40 | (Canada) | Def | Rubel, Ian |
| 93 | | ?? | Squire, Kim |
| 20 | | ?? | Stapleford, Scott |
| 17 | (Canada) | Def | Toll, Steve |
| 32 | (Canada) | Fwd | Veltman, Jim |
| 29 | (Canada) | Goalie | Watson, Bob |
| 10 | (Canada) | Fwd | Wilson, Aaron |

== See also ==
- 2003 NLL season
