= 2004 Toronto Rock season =

Lacrosse season

2004 Toronto Rock
- East Division Champions
- League: NLL
- Division: 1st East
- 2004 record: 10-6
- Home record: 5-3
- Road record: 5-3
- Goals for: 202
- Goals against: 176
- General Manager: Derek Keenan (interim); Terry Sanderson
- Coach: Ed Comeau (interim); Terry Sanderson
- Captain: Jim Veltman
- Arena: Air Canada Centre
- Average attendance: 16,907

Team leaders
- Goals: Blaine Manning (36)
- Assists: Colin Doyle (55)
- Points: Blaine Manning (90)
- Penalties in minutes: Patrick Merrill (19)
- Loose Balls: Jim Veltman (193)
- Wins: Bob Watson & Anthony Cosmo (5)
- Goals against average: Anthony Cosmo (10.39)

The Toronto Rock are a lacrosse team based in Toronto playing in the National Lacrosse League (NLL). The 2004 season was the 7th in franchise history and 6th as the Rock.

The Rock continued its dynasty on top of the NLL standings, finishing first in its division for the sixth straight year. The Rock lost to the Buffalo Bandits in the division final, failing in their attempt at three consecutive championships.

== Regular season ==
=== Conference standings ===
East Division
P	Team	GP	W	L	PCT	GB	Home	Road	GF	GA	Diff	GF/GP	GA/GP
1	Toronto Rock – xy	16	10	6	.625	0.0	5–3	5–3	202	176	+26	12.62	11.00
2	Rochester Knighthawks – x	16	8	8	.500	2.0	6–2	2–6	173	186	−13	10.81	11.62
3	Buffalo Bandits – x	16	8	8	.500	2.0	4–4	4–4	205	198	+7	12.81	12.38
4	Philadelphia Wings	16	7	9	.438	3.0	3–5	4–4	192	198	−6	12.00	12.38

West Division
P	Team	GP	W	L	PCT	GB	Home	Road	GF	GA	Diff	GF/GP	GA/GP
1	Colorado Mammoth – xyz	16	13	3	.812	0.0	7–1	6–2	223	173	+50	13.94	10.81
2	San Jose Stealth – x	16	11	5	.688	2.0	7–1	4–4	204	201	+3	12.75	12.56
3	Calgary Roughnecks – x	16	10	6	.625	3.0	4–4	6–2	214	187	+27	13.38	11.69
4	Arizona Sting	16	7	9	.438	6.0	6–2	1–7	200	208	−8	12.50	13.00
5	Vancouver Ravens	16	5	11	.312	8.0	3–5	2–6	188	213	−25	11.75	13.31
6	Anaheim Storm	16	1	15	.062	12.0	1–7	0–8	171	227	−56	10.69	14.19

x: Clinched playoff berth; c: Clinched playoff berth by crossing over to another division; y: Clinched division; z: Clinched best regular season record; GP: Games Played
W: Wins; L: Losses; GB: Games back; PCT: Win percentage; Home: Record at Home; Road: Record on the Road; GF: Goals scored; GA: Goals allowed
Differential: Difference between goals scored and allowed; GF/GP: Average number of goals scored per game; GA/GP: Average number of goals allowed per game

=== Game log ===
Game	Date	Opponent	Location	Score	OT	Attendance	Record
1	January 10, 2004	@ Rochester Knighthawks	Blue Cross Arena	L 8–13		8,214	0–1
2	January 16, 2004	Calgary Roughnecks	Air Canada Centre	W 18–12		16,124	1–1
3	January 23, 2004	Vancouver Ravens	Air Canada Centre	W 17–12		15,400	2–1
4	January 31, 2004	@ Rochester Knighthawks	Blue Cross Arena	L 10–11		8,786	2–2
5	February 7, 2004	Philadelphia Wings	Air Canada Centre	L 8–10		17,550	2–3
6	February 13, 2004	Buffalo Bandits	Air Canada Centre	L 9–13		15,107	2–4
7	February 20, 2004	@ Vancouver Ravens	GM Place	W 15–6		8,824	3–4
8	February 27, 2004	Philadelphia Wings	Air Canada Centre	W 18–15		15,820	4–4
9	February 28, 2004	@ Philadelphia Wings	Wachovia Center	W 11–10		13,606	5–4
10	March 5, 2004	@ Buffalo Bandits	HSBC Arena	W 13–11		9,299	6–4
11	March 12, 2004	Rochester Knighthawks	Air Canada Centre	W 13–9		17,625	7–4
12	March 13, 2004	@ Philadelphia Wings	Wachovia Center	W 12–10		14,184	8–4
13	March 26, 2004	Buffalo Bandits	Air Canada Centre	W 14–11		18,809	9–4
14	March 27, 2004	@ Buffalo Bandits	HSBC Arena	W 15–9		10,599	10–4
15	April 2, 2004	@ Calgary Roughnecks	Pengrowth Saddledome	L 10–11	2OT	12,454	10–5
16	April 9, 2004	Rochester Knighthawks	Air Canada Centre	L 11–13		18,821	10–6

== Playoffs ==
=== Game log ===
Game	Date	Opponent	Location	Score	OT	Attendance	Record
Division Final	April 25, 2004	Buffalo Bandits	Air Canada Centre	L 10–19		14,618	0–1

== Player stats ==
=== Runners (Top 10) ===
Note: GP = Games played; G = Goals; A = Assists; Pts = Points; LB = Loose Balls; PIM = Penalty Minutes

Player	GP	G	A	Pts	LB	PIM
Blaine Manning	16	36	54	90	81	7
Colin Doyle	16	33	55	88	64	11
Jim Veltman	16	12	53	65	179	9
Matt Shearer	12	26	18	44	32	3
Aaron Wilson	13	24	18	42	58	3
Steve Toll	16	15	19	34	141	1
Chris Driscoll	16	15	19	34	64	9
Ken Millin	14	12	15	27	48	5
Ryan Painter	8	8	11	19	25	3
Darryl Gibson	16	6	8	14	62	11
Totals		202	311	513	1110	147

=== Goaltenders ===
Note: GP = Games played; MIN = Minutes; W = Wins; L = Losses; GA = Goals against; Sv% = Save percentage; GAA = Goals against average

Player	GP	MIN	W	L	GA	Sv%	GAA
Bob Watson	11	571:07	5	5	106	.755	11.14
Anthony Cosmo	9	392:44	5	1	68	.766	10.39
Totals			10	6	176	.757	10.92

== Awards ==
Player	Award
Jim Veltman	NLL Most Valuable Player
Jim Veltman	Player of the Month, March
Jim Veltman	First All-Pro Team
Blaine Manning	Second All-Pro Team
Colin Doyle	Second All-Pro Team
Colin Doyle	All-Stars
Blaine Manning	All-Stars
Pat Coyle	All-Stars
Glenn Clark	All-Stars
Jim Veltman	All-Stars

== Roster ==
No.		Position	Player
5	(Canada)	Fwd	Sandy Chapman
11	(Canada)	Def	Glenn Clark
2	(Canada)	Def	Pat Coyle
44	(Canada)	Goalie	Anthony Cosmo
91		??	Brian Croswell
7	(Canada)	Fwd	Colin Doyle
73	(Canada)	Fwd	Chris Driscoll
19	(Canada)	Def	Darryl Gibson
12		??	Pat Jones
6	(Canada)	Def	Dan Ladouceur
21		??	Marc Landriault
4		??	Carter Livingstone

No.		Position	Player
16	(Canada)	Fwd	Blaine Manning
9	(Canada)	Def	Patrick Merrill
33	(Canada)	Fwd	Ken Millin
42		??	Eric Pacey
14		??	Ryan Painter
40	(Canada)	Def	Ian Rubel
24	(Canada)	Fwd	Matt Shearer
27	(Canada)	Def	Derek Suddons
17	(Canada)	Def	Steve Toll
32	(Canada)	Fwd	Jim Veltman
29	(Canada)	Goalie	Bob Watson
10	(Canada)	Fwd	Aaron Wilson

== See also ==
- 2004 NLL season
