= 2001 Toronto Rock season =

2001 Toronto Rock
- Division Champions
- League: NLL
- Rank: 1st
- 2001 record: 11-3
- Home record: 6-1
- Road record: 5-2
- Goals for: 168
- Goals against: 125
- General Manager: Les Bartley
- Coach: Les Bartley
- Captain: Jim Veltman
- Arena: Air Canada Centre
- Average attendance: 15,749

Team leaders
- Goals: Colin Doyle & Kim Squire (26)
- Assists: Colin Doyle (33)
- Points: Colin Doyle (59)
- Penalties in minutes: Pat Coyle (65)
- Loose Balls: Jim Veltman (161)
- Wins: Bob Watson (10)
- Goals against average: Anthony Cosmo (8.62)

The Toronto Rock are a lacrosse team based in Toronto playing in the National Lacrosse League (NLL). The 2001 season was the 4th in franchise history and 3rd as the Rock.

The Rock continued its dynasty on top of the NLL standings, finishing first in its division for the third straight year. The Rock beat the Washington Power in the semifinals, to advance to the championship game. However they lost to the Philadelphia Wings and failed in their attempt at three consecutive championships.

== Regular season ==
=== Conference standings ===
P	Team	GP	W	L	PCT	GB	Home	Road	GF	GA	Diff	GF/GP	GA/GP
1	Toronto Rock – xyz	14	11	3	.786	0.0	6–1	5–2	168	125	+43	12.00	8.93
2	Philadelphia Wings – x	14	10	4	.714	1.0	6–1	4–3	205	177	+28	14.64	12.64
3	Rochester Knighthawks – x	14	10	4	.714	1.0	6–1	4–3	198	159	+39	14.14	11.36
4	Washington Power – x	14	9	5	.643	2.0	4–3	5–2	226	204	+22	16.14	14.57
5	Buffalo Bandits	14	8	6	.571	3.0	4–3	4–3	248	218	+30	17.71	15.57
6	New York Saints	14	6	8	.429	5.0	3–4	3–4	179	181	−2	12.79	12.93
7	Albany Attack	14	5	9	.357	6.0	3–4	2–5	152	169	−17	10.86	12.07
8	Columbus Landsharks	14	3	11	.214	8.0	1–6	2–5	134	201	−67	9.57	14.36
9	Ottawa Rebel	14	1	13	.071	10.0	0–7	1–6	144	220	−76	10.29	15.71

x: Clinched playoff berth; c: Clinched playoff berth by crossing over to another division; y: Clinched division; z: Clinched best regular season record; GP: Games Played
W: Wins; L: Losses; GB: Games back; PCT: Win percentage; Home: Record at Home; Road: Record on the Road; GF: Goals scored; GA: Goals allowed
Differential: Difference between goals scored and allowed; GF/GP: Average number of goals scored per game; GA/GP: Average number of goals allowed per game

=== Game log ===
Game	Date	Opponent	Location	Score	OT	Attendance	Record
1	December 21, 2000	Ottawa Rebel	Air Canada Centre	W 17–7		13,333	1–0
2	December 31, 2000	@ Washington Power	MCI Center	L 12–13		1,778	1–1
3	January 5, 2001	@ Ottawa Rebel	Corel Centre	W 16–7		12,193	2–1
4	January 11, 2001	Albany Attack	Air Canada Centre	W 7–4		12,222	3–1
5	January 26, 2001	Washington Power	Air Canada Centre	L 13–16		16,373	3–2
6	January 27, 2001	@ Buffalo Bandits	HSBC Arena	W 14–13	2OT	8,452	4–2
7	February 3, 2001	@ New York Saints	Nassau Veterans Memorial Coliseum	W 14–9		7,638	5–2
8	February 9, 2001	Philadelphia Wings	Air Canada Centre	W 17–11		15,497	6–2
9	February 17, 2001	@ Rochester Knighthawks	Blue Cross Arena	L 7–12		9,361	6–3
10	February 25, 2001	New York Saints	Air Canada Centre	W 10–9	OT	17,059	7–3
11	March 10, 2001	@ Philadelphia Wings	First Union Center	W 11–7		13,485	8–3
12	March 16, 2001	@ Columbus Landsharks	Nationwide Arena	W 8–5		5,120	9–3
13	March 31, 2001	Columbus Landsharks	Air Canada Centre	W 11–8		19,059	10–3
14	April 5, 2001	Rochester Knighthawks	Air Canada Centre	W 11–4		16,700	11–3

== Playoffs ==
=== Game log ===
Game	Date	Opponent	Location	Score	OT	Attendance	Record
Semifinals	April 21, 2001	Washington Power	Air Canada Centre	W 10–9		15,831	1–0
Championship Game	April 27, 2001	Philadelphia Wings	Air Canada Centre	L 8–9		19,409	1–1

== Player stats ==
=== Runners (Top 10) ===
Note: GP = Games played; G = Goals; A = Assists; Pts = Points; LB = Loose Balls; PIM = Penalty minutes

Player	GP	G	A	Pts	LB	PIM
Colin Doyle	14	26	33	59	55	28
Kim Squire	13	26	30	56	72	31
Kaleb Toth	14	23	22	45	81	10
Dan Stroup	14	19	19	38	87	0
Steve Toll	14	15	20	35	128	6
Chris Gill	14	19	15	34	57	0
Jim Veltman	14	9	23	32	161	13
Ken Millin	14	7	10	17	49	12
Pat Coyle	14	4	10	14	104	65
Chris Langdale	14	5	9	14	35	18
Totals		168	213	381	1202	369

=== Goaltenders ===
Note: GP = Games played; MIN = Minutes; W = Wins; L = Losses; GA = Goals against; Sv% = Save percentage; GAA = Goals against average

Player	GP	MIN	W	L	GA	Sv%	GAA
Bob Watson	13	715:28	10	2	106	.797	8.89
Anthony Cosmo	4	132:17	1	1	19	.784	8.62
Totals			11	3	125	.795	8.83

== Awards ==
Player	Award
Bob Watson	Goaltender of the Year Award
Bob Watson	First All-Pro Team
Jim Veltman	Second All-Pro Team
Kim Squire	Second All-Pro Team
Colin Doyle	Second All-Pro Team

== Roster ==
No.		Position	Player
97		??	Bullen, Terry
11	(Canada)	Def	Clark, Glenn
2	(Canada)	Def	Coyle, Pat
44	(Canada)	Goalie	Cosmo, Anthony
7	(Canada)	Fwd	Doyle, Colin
23		??	Gelsvik, Craig
25		??	Gill, Chris
14		??	Harrison, Dean
6	(Canada)	Def	Ladouceur, Dan
10		??	Langdale, Chris
76		??	Maynard, Niall

No.		Position	Player
33	(Canada)	Fwd	Millin, Ken
67		??	O'Connor, Ryan
93		??	Squire, Kim
34		??	Squire, Rodd
8	(Canada)	Fwd	Stroup, Dan
43		??	Taylor, Jamie
17	(Canada)	Def	Toll, Steve
9	(Canada)	Fwd	Toth, Kaleb
32	(Canada)	Fwd	Veltman, Jim
29	(Canada)	Goalie	Watson, Bob

== See also ==
- 2001 NLL season
