= 2000 Toronto Rock season =

2000 Toronto Rock
- Champion's Cup Champions
- Division Champions
- League: NLL
- Rank: 1st
- 2000 record: 9-3
- Home record: 5-1
- Road record: 4-2
- Goals for: 162
- Goals against: 130
- General Manager: John Mouradian
- Coach: Les Bartley
- Captain: Jim Veltman
- Arena: Maple Leaf Gardens
- Average attendance: 13,881

Team leaders
- Goals: Chris Gill (30)
- Assists: Jim Veltman (37)
- Points: Chris Gill (50)
- Penalties in minutes: Dan Ladouceur (43)
- Loose Balls: Jim Veltman (164)
- Wins: Bob Watson (9)

The Toronto Rock are a lacrosse team based in Toronto playing in the National Lacrosse League (NLL). The 2000 season was the 3rd in franchise history and 2nd as the Rock.

The Rock finished on top of the NLL standings, winning its division for the second straight year. The Rock beat the Philadelphia Wings in the semifinals, to advance to the championship game. Their victory over the Rochester Knighthawks in this game gave them their second consecutive championship.

== Regular season ==
=== Conference standings ===
P	Team	GP	W	L	PCT	GB	Home	Road	GF	GA	Diff	GF/GP	GA/GP
1	Toronto Rock – xyz	12	9	3	.750	0.0	5–1	4–2	162	130	+32	13.50	10.83
2	Buffalo Bandits – x	12	8	4	.667	1.0	5–1	3–3	202	194	+8	16.83	16.17
3	Rochester Knighthawks – x	12	8	4	.667	1.0	5–1	3–3	187	149	+38	15.58	12.42
4	Philadelphia Wings – x	12	7	5	.583	2.0	4–2	3–3	172	165	+7	14.33	13.75
5	Albany Attack	12	6	6	.500	3.0	4–2	2–4	169	160	+9	14.08	13.33
6	Pittsburgh CrosseFire	12	6	6	.500	3.0	4–2	2–4	184	164	+20	15.33	13.67
7	New York Saints	12	3	9	.250	6.0	2–4	1–5	152	194	−42	12.67	16.17
8	Syracuse Smash	12	1	11	.083	8.0	1–5	0–6	135	207	−72	11.25	17.25

x: Clinched playoff berth; c: Clinched playoff berth by crossing over to another division; y: Clinched division; z: Clinched best regular season record; GP: Games Played
W: Wins; L: Losses; GB: Games back; PCT: Win percentage; Home: Record at Home; Road: Record on the Road; GF: Goals scored; GA: Goals allowed
Differential: Difference between goals scored and allowed; GF/GP: Average number of goals scored per game; GA/GP: Average number of goals allowed per game

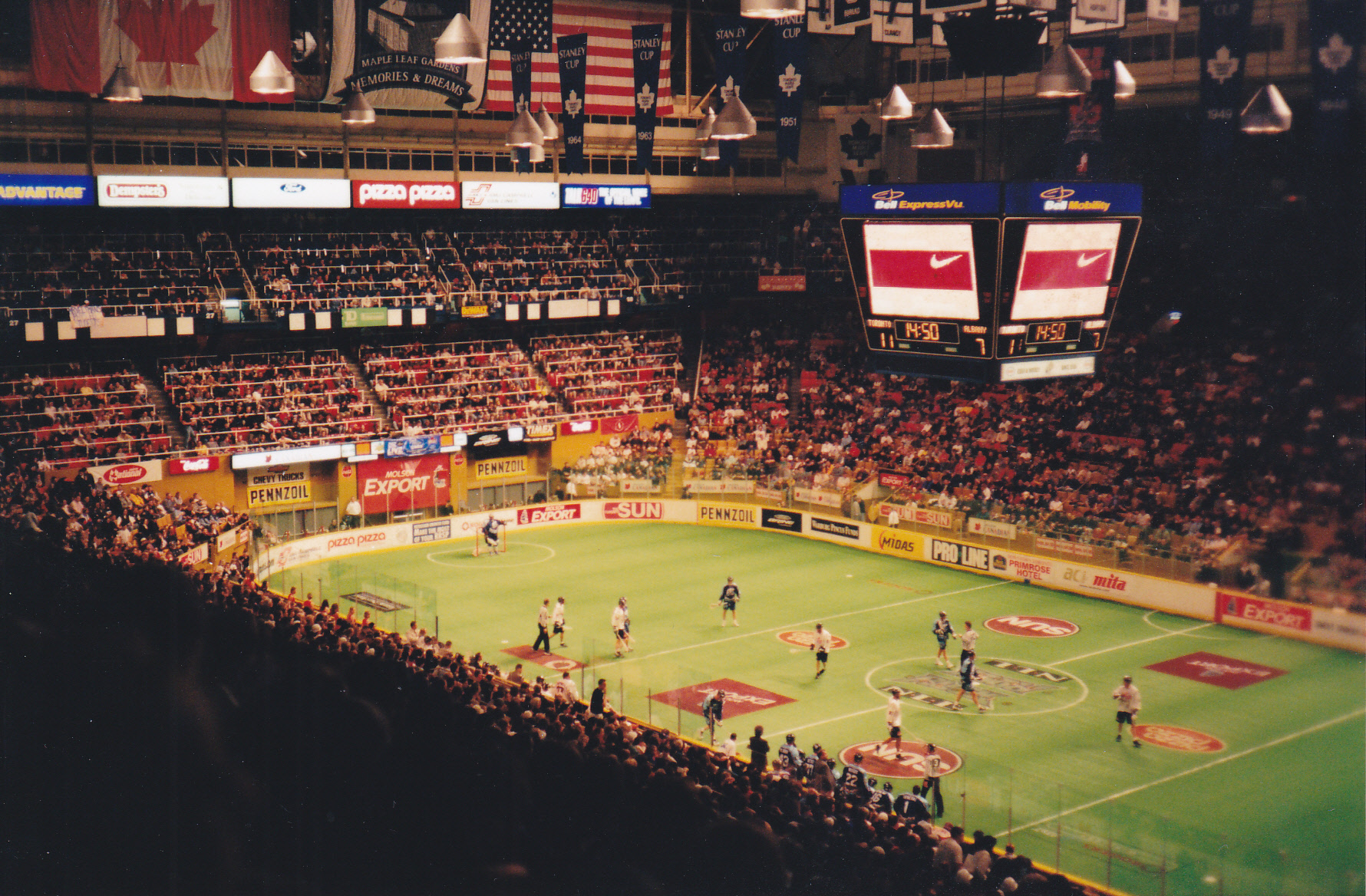
The Toronto Rock vs Albany Attack on 8 April 2000

=== Game log ===
Game	Date	Opponent	Location	Score	OT	Attendance	Record
1	January 8, 2000	@ Buffalo Bandits	Marine Midland Arena	W 17–14		7,457	1–0
2	January 21, 2000	New York Saints	Maple Leaf Gardens	W 9–5		14,026	2–0
3	January 28, 2000	@ Pittsburgh CrosseFire	Mellon Arena	W 11–9		3,217	3–0
4	February 5, 2000	@ Rochester Knighthawks	Blue Cross Arena	L 9–14		10,181	3–1
5	February 11, 2000	Rochester Knighthawks	Maple Leaf Gardens	W 11–10		13,646	4–1
6	February 26, 2000	Buffalo Bandits	Maple Leaf Gardens	L 12–18		14,075	4–2
7	March 3, 2000	Syracuse Smash	Maple Leaf Gardens	W 15–10		12,012	5–2
8	March 11, 2000	@ Albany Attack	Pepsi Arena	L 7–8		4,355	5–3
9	March 25, 2000	@ Philadelphia Wings	First Union Center	W 15–13		16,544	6–3
10	March 31, 2000	Pittsburgh CrosseFire	Maple Leaf Gardens	W 14–10		15,050	7–3
11	April 8, 2000	Albany Attack	Maple Leaf Gardens	W 17–8		15,078	8–3
12	April 15, 2000	@ Syracuse Smash	Onondaga County War Memorial	W 25–11		1,987	9–3

== Playoffs ==
=== Game log ===
Game	Date	Opponent	Location	Score	OT	Attendance	Record
Semifinal	April 22, 2000	Philadelphia Wings	Maple Leaf Gardens	W 14–10		10,561	1–0
Championship Game	May 6, 2000	Rochester Knighthawks	Maple Leaf Gardens	W 14–13		14,211	2–0

== Player stats ==
=== Runners (Top 10) ===
Note: GP = Games played; G = Goals; A = Assists; Pts = Points; LB = Loose Balls; PIM = Penalty minutes

Player	GP	G	A	Pts	LB	PIM
Chris Gill	12	30	20	50		6
Dan Stroup	12	29	17	46		6
Jim Veltman	12	7	37	44	164	10
Colin Doyle	11	16	26	42		35
Kaleb Toth	12	18	22	40		10
Kim Squire	5	14	11	25		5
Steve Toll	12	9	13	22		6
Chris Langdale	10	8	11	19		14
Ryan O'Connor	9	7	12	19		6
Glenn Clark	12	7	10	17		24
Totals		162	239	401		284

=== Goaltenders ===
Note: GP = Games played; MIN = Minutes; W = Wins; L = Losses; GA = Goals against; Sv% = Save percentage; GAA = Goals against average

Player	GP	MIN	W	L	GA	Sv%	GAA
Bob Watson	12	679	9	3	125	.772	11.05
Pat Campbell			0	0			
Totals			9	3			

== Awards ==
Player	Award
Dan Stroup	Championship Game MVP
Jim Veltman	First All-Pro Team
Bob Watson	First All-Pro Team

== Roster ==
No.		Position	Player
97		Def	Bullen, Terry
37		Goalie	Campbell, Pat
11	(Canada)	Def	Clark, Glenn
2	(Canada)	Def	Coyle, Pat
19		Fwd	Diaron, Brad
7	(Canada)	Fwd	Doyle, Colin
25		Fwd	Gill, Chris
22			Graham, Rory
14		??	Harrison, Dean
99		Fwd	Heard, Russ
6	(Canada)	Def	Ladouceur, Dan

No.		Position	Player
10		Fwd	Langdale, Chris
76		Fwd	Maynard, Niall
33	(Canada)	Fwd	Millin, Ken
67		Fwd	O'Connor, Ryan
93		Fwd	Squire, Kim
34		??	Squire, Rodd
8	(Canada)	Fwd	Stroup, Dan
17	(Canada)	Def	Toll, Steve
9	(Canada)	Fwd	Toth, Kaleb
32	(Canada)	Fwd	Veltman, Jim
29	(Canada)	Goalie	Watson, Bob

== See also ==
- 2000 NLL season
