= National Lacrosse League Hall of Fame =

North American hall of fame for indoor lacrosse

The National Lacrosse League Hall of Fame was established on June 16, 2005. The National Lacrosse League's board of governors will vote in the Hall of Fame members based on the individual’s record, ability, integrity, sportsmanship, character and contributions to the team or teams that individual was affiliated with or the league. The league will also have contributions of journalists and broadcasters inducted into the Hall of Fame.

Currently, there is no building or location associated with the NLL Hall of Fame.

== Members ==
=== Charter members ===
Inducted, February 23, 2006

- Russ Cline
- Chris Fritz
- Gary Gait
- Paul Gait
- Les Bartley

=== 2007 Inductees ===
Inducted February 16, 2007

- Tom Marechek
- Darris Kilgour
- Mike French
- Tom Borrelli

=== 2008 Inductees ===
Inducted February 28, 2008

- Sal LoCascio
- Johnny Mouradian
- Tony Resch
- Neil Stevens

=== 2009 Inductees ===
Inducted March 7, 2009

- Dallas Eliuk
- Jim Veltman

=== 2010 Inductees ===
Inducted September 9, 2010

- Rich Kilgour
- Dan Stroup
- John Tucker

=== 2011 Inductees ===
- Bob Watson

=== 2012 Inductees ===
- Steve Dietrich

=== 2013 Inductees ===
- Pat O'Toole

=== 2014 Inductees ===
- Pat Coyle
- Chris Hall

=== 2015 Inductees ===
- Terry Sanderson

=== 2016 Inductees ===
- Tracey Kelusky
- Josh Sanderson
- John Tavares

=== 2021 Inductees ===
After a five-year hiatus, ten new members were inducted into the Hall of Fame in 2021.

Players

- Colin Doyle
- Kevin Finneran
- John Grant Jr.
- Casey Powell
- Shawn Williams
- Pat McCready
- Regy Thorpe
- Steve Toll

Officials

- Roy Condon
- Bill Fox

=== 2026 Inductees ===
Players

- Sandy Chapman
- Dan Dawson
- Shawn Evans
- Mark Steenhuis

Veterans

- Mike Accursi
- Jake Bergey
- Gavin Prout

Builders

- John Gurtler
