= Brad Watters =

Canadian sports executive

Brad Watters (born 1971) is a sports executive who was president of the Toronto Argonauts and Toronto Rock. He ran Ottawa Rebel and the Ottawa Renegades.

== Biography ==
He grew up in Leaside, Toronto, studied at Huron University College part of the University of Western Ontario and is the son of Bill Watters.

He bought the Ontario Raiders in 1999 and moved them to Toronto where they became Toronto Rock. From 2001 to 2003, Brad Watters owned the Ottawa Rebel National Lacrosse League franchise. The team became inactive after the 2003 season and was later purchased by Bruce Urban and moved to Edmonton, Alberta, becoming the Edmonton Rush. Watters also established the Ottawa Renegades of the Canadian Football League in 2001. Watters sold the team to Bernard Glieberman in 2005. The team suspended operations the following year, before folding in 2008.

Throughout his time in sports management he was in charge of his own company, BJW Sports Inc. From 2007, he was joint team president of the Toronto Argonauts with Pinball Clemons. In 2009, he was succeeded by Bob Nicholson who was previously team president of the Argonauts from 1995 to 1999. He went on to return as president and chief executive officer of Toronto Rock National Lacrosse League team.
