= 1999 Toronto Rock season =

1999 Toronto Rock
- Champion's Cup Champions
- Division Champions
- League: NLL
- Rank: 1st
- 1999 record: 9-3
- Home record: 6-0
- Road record: 3-3
- Goals for: 157
- Goals against: 139
- General Manager: John Mouradian
- Coach: Les Bartley
- Captain: Jim Veltman
- Arena: Maple Leaf Gardens
- Average attendance: 11,075

Team leaders
- Assists: Colin Doyle (37)
- Points: Colin Doyle (54)
- Loose Balls: Jim Veltman (166)
- Wins: Bob Watson (6)

The Toronto Rock are a lacrosse team based in Toronto playing in the National Lacrosse League (NLL). The 1999 season was the 2nd in franchise history and 1st time as "the Rock" after a season in Hamilton, Ontario as the Ontario Raiders.

The Rock finished on top of the NLL standings, winning its first division in franchise history. The Rock beat the Philadelphia Wings in the semifinals, to advance to the championship game. Their victory over the Rochester Knighthawks in this game gave them their first NLL championship.

== Regular season ==
=== Conference standings ===
P	Team	GP	W	L	PCT	GB	Home	Road	GF	GA	Diff	GF/GP	GA/GP
1	Toronto Rock – xyz	12	9	3	.750	0.0	6–0	3–3	157	139	+18	13.08	11.58
2	Baltimore Thunder – x	12	8	4	.667	1.0	5–1	3–3	211	175	+36	17.58	14.58
3	Rochester Knighthawks – x	12	8	4	.667	1.0	4–2	4–2	169	160	+9	14.08	13.33
4	Philadelphia Wings – x	12	5	7	.417	4.0	4–2	1–5	153	153	−-0	12.75	12.75
5	New York Saints	12	5	7	.417	4.0	2–4	3–3	149	156	−7	12.42	13.00
6	Buffalo Bandits	12	4	8	.333	5.0	1–5	3–3	158	177	−19	13.17	14.75
7	Syracuse Smash	12	3	9	.250	6.0	3–3	0–6	161	198	−37	13.42	16.50

x: Clinched playoff berth; c: Clinched playoff berth by crossing over to another division; y: Clinched division; z: Clinched best regular season record; GP: Games Played
W: Wins; L: Losses; GB: Games back; PCT: Win percentage; Home: Record at Home; Road: Record on the Road; GF: Goals scored; GA: Goals allowed
Differential: Difference between goals scored and allowed; GF/GP: Average number of goals scored per game; GA/GP: Average number of goals allowed per game

=== Game log ===
The 1999 Regular Season games are listed below.

Game	Date	Opponent	Location	Score	OT	Attendance	Record
1	January 9, 1999	@ Baltimore Thunder	Baltimore Arena	L 10–21		5,738	0–1
2	January 22, 1999	Buffalo Bandits	Maple Leaf Gardens	W 11–10		11,052	1–1
3	January 29, 1999	Rochester Knighthawks	Maple Leaf Gardens	W 16–9		9,691	2–1
4	February 6, 1999	@ Rochester Knighthawks	Blue Cross Arena	L 10–11	OT	9,042	2–2
5	February 19, 1999	Philadelphia Wings	Maple Leaf Gardens	W 9–7		10,166	3–2
6	February 26, 1999	New York Saints	Maple Leaf Gardens	W 13–9		9,012	4–2
7	February 27, 1999	@ Philadelphia Wings	First Union Center	L 11–12	OT	17,057	4–3
8	March 13, 1999	@ Syracuse Smash	Onondaga County War Memorial	W 19–12		4,237	5–3
9	March 26, 1999	Syracuse Smash	Maple Leaf Gardens	W 19–12		13,300	6–3
10	March 27, 1999	@ Buffalo Bandits	Marine Midland Arena	W 13–12	OT	10,723	7–3
11	April 2, 1999	Baltimore Thunder	Maple Leaf Gardens	W 16–15		13,230	8–3
12	April 9, 1999	@ New York Saints	Nassau Coliseum	W 10–9		5,619	9–3

== Playoffs ==
=== Game log ===
Game	Date	Opponent	Location	Score	OT	Attendance	Record
Semifinals	April 16, 1999	Philadelphia Wings	Maple Leaf Gardens	W 13–2		12,026	1–0
Championship Game	April 23, 1999	Rochester Knighthawks	Maple Leaf Gardens	W 13–10		15,691	2–0

== Player stats ==
=== Runners (Top 10) ===
Note: GP = Games played; G = Goals; A = Assists; Pts = Points; LB = Loose Balls; PIM = Penalty minutes

Player	GP	G	A	Pts	LB	PIM
Colin Doyle	12	17	37	54		
Totals						

=== Goaltenders ===
Note: GP = Games played; MIN = Minutes; W = Wins; L = Losses; GA = Goals against; Sv% = Save percentage; GAA = Goals against average

Player	GP	MIN	W	L	GA	Sv%	GAA
Bob Watson		548	6	2	110	.758	12.04
Totals							

== Awards ==
Player	Award
Colin Doyle	Championship Game MVP
Bob Watson	Player of the Month, February
Jim Veltman	First All-Pro Team
Bob Watson	Second All-Pro Team
Bob Watson	All-Stars
Colin Doyle	All-Stars
Chris Gill	All-Stars
Jim Veltman	All-Stars

== Roster ==
No.		Position	Player
11	(Canada)	Def	Clark, Glenn
2	(Canada)	Def	Coyle, Pat
7	(Canada)	Fwd	Doyle, Colin
25		Fwd	Gill, Chris

No.		Position	Player
6	(Canada)	Def	Ladouceur, Dan
8	(Canada)	Fwd	Stroup, Dan
32	(Canada)	Fwd	Veltman, Jim
29	(Canada)	Goalie	Watson, Bob

== See also ==
- 1999 NLL season
