= Ed Comeau =

Canadian lacrosse head coach

Ed Comeau is a Canadian lacrosse head coach, best known for being head coach of the Georgia Swarm of the NLL. He is the former head coach of the Orlando Titans, until they folded in 2010.

Comeau began his NLL coaching career with the Toronto Rock, as an assistant coach under the legendary Les Bartley. The Rock won four NLL Championships under Bartley (1999, 2000, 2002, and 2003 NLL season).

In November 2003, Bartley stepped down as he was suffering from colon cancer, and Comeau was promoted to interim head coach. However, less than four months later, after a 2-4 start, both Comeau and interim GM Derek Keenan were fired by the Rock, replaced by Terry Sanderson.

In 2004, Comeau joined the Rochester Knighthawks as an assistant coach, and was then promoted to head coach at the beginning of the 2006 season, replacing Paul Day. Rochester finished with a 9-7 record, second in the Eastern division, but were eliminated from the playoffs by the Buffalo Bandits in the division finals.

In 2007, the Knighthawks began the season 2-2, and then won a franchise record 12 straight games to finish the season with a 14-2 mark, tied for the best record since the NLL went to a 16-game schedule. They continued the winning streak in the postseason, defeating Toronto, Buffalo, and finally Arizona to win their first championship since 1997. After the season, Comeau was named the winner of the Les Bartley Award for coach of the year.

After a disappointing 2008 season in which the Knighthawks missed the playoffs for the first time in franchise history, Comeau announced that he would not be returning to the Knighthawks. Only three days later, Comeau was announced as the new head coach of the New York Titans, after former coach Adam Mueller announced his retirement. The same year, he achieved a master’s degree in sports coaching from the United States Sports Academy.

== NLL head coaching statistics ==
Team	Season	Regular season				Playoffs				Playoff result
Team	Season	GC	W	L	W%	GC	W	L	W%	Playoff result
Toronto Rock	2004*	6	2	4	.333	–	–	–	–	Fired
Rochester Knighthawks	2006	16	9	7	.562	2	1	1	.500	Lost Division Final (BUF)
Rochester Knighthawks	2007	16	14	2	.875	3	3	0	1.000	Won Champions' Cup (ARZ)
Rochester Knighthawks	2008	16	8	8	.500	–	–	–	–	Did not qualify
New York Titans	2009	16	10	6	.625	3	2	1	.667	Lost Champions' Cup (CGY)
Orlando Titans	2010	16	11	5	.688	2	1	1	.500	Lost Division Final (TOR)
Georgia Swarm	2016	18	8	10	.444	1	0	1	.000	Lost Eastern Division Semifinal (NE)
Georgia Swarm	2017	18	13	5	.722	4	4	0	1.000	Won NLL Finals (SSK)
Georgia Swarm	2018	18	11	7	.611	1	0	1	.000	Lost Eastern Division Final (ROC)
Georgia Swarm	2019	18	12	6	.667	1	0	1	.000	Lost Eastern Division Final (TOR)
Georgia Swarm	2020	12	7	5	.583	–	–	–	–	Season suspended due to the COVID-19 pandemic
Georgia Swarm	2022	18	9	9	.500	–	–	–	–	Did not qualify
Georgia Swarm	2023	18	8	10	.444	–	–	–	–	Did not qualify
Georgia Swarm	2024	18	10	8	.556	1	0	1	.000	Lost NLL Quarterfinal (BUF)
Georgia Swarm	2025	18	9	9	.500	1	0	1	.000	Lost NLL Quarterfinal (SSK)
Georgia Swarm	2026	18	12	6	.667	4	2	2	.500	Lost NLL Semifinals (HFX)
Totals:	16	260	153	107	.588	23	12	11	.522	

* - interim head coach

== Awards ==
Preceded by Derek Keenan	Les Bartley Award; 2007	Succeeded by Adam Mueller
Preceded by Marty O'Neill	NLL GM of the Year; 2009	Succeeded by Derek Keenan
