= Whipper Watson =

Whipper Watson may refer to:

- Whipper Billy Watson (1915–1990), Canadian professional wrestler
- Harry Watson (ice hockey b. 1923) (1923–2002), Canadian National Hockey League hockey player
- Bob Watson (lacrosse) (b. 1970), goaltender for the Toronto Rock of the National Lacrosse League
- Kenan Thompson, from Kenan and Kel
