= Pat Coyle =

Pat Coyle may refer to:

- Pat Coyle (basketball) (born 1960), female WNBA coach for the New York Liberty
- Pat Coyle (lacrosse) (born 1969), male retired lacrosse player
