= Montreal Express =

Canadian lacrosse team

- League: National Lacrosse League
- Division: Central Division
- Based in: Montreal, Quebec, Canada
- Arena: Molson Centre
- Colours: Black, Blue

The Montreal Express was a member of the National Lacrosse League during the 2002 season. They played at the Molson Centre in Montreal, Quebec. They were inactive during the 2003 and 2004 seasons. The team remained inactive and the franchise was returned to the NLL after the 2004 season. The NLL in turn sold the rights to the franchise to the Minnesota Swarm for the 2005 NLL season.

The first-ever Express game was a record-setting affair, with the Express defeating their expansion cousins the Calgary Roughnecks by a final score of 32-17. New NLL records for most goals by one team (32), most goals by two teams (49), and most penalty minutes by two teams (155) were all set in this game.

== All time Record ==
| Season | Division | W-L | Finish | Home | Road | GF | GA | Coach | Playoffs |
|---|---|---|---|---|---|---|---|---|---|
| 2002 | Central | 8-8 | 3rd | 4-4 | 4-4 | 237 | 227 | Terry Sanderson | Missed playoffs |
| Total | 1 season | 8-8 | | 4-4 | 4-4 | 237 | 227 | | |

=== 2001–02 schedule ===
| Game | Date | Opponent | Location | Score | OT | Attendance | Record |
|---|---|---|---|---|---|---|---|
| 1 | November 24, 2001 | @ Calgary Roughnecks | Scotiabank Saddledome | W 32–17 | | 9,517 | 1–0 |
| 2 | November 29, 2001 | Calgary Roughnecks | Bell Centre | W 23–16 | | 7,634 | 2–0 |
| 3 | December 2, 2001 | @ Buffalo Bandits | HSBC Arena | W 18–17 | OT | 6,118 | 3–0 |
| 4 | December 4, 2001 | Vancouver Ravens | Bell Centre | L 13–17 | | 6,590 | 3–1 |
| 5 | January 11, 2002 | Columbus Landsharks | Bell Centre | L 12–13 | | 9,296 | 3–2 |
| 6 | January 25, 2002 | Ottawa Rebel | Bell Centre | W 20–15 | | 7,132 | 4–2 |
| 7 | January 27, 2002 | @ Ottawa Rebel | Canadian Tire Centre | W 13–7 | | 6,304 | 5–2 |
| 8 | February 1, 2002 | Buffalo Bandits | Bell Centre | W 10–7 | | 8,317 | 6–2 |
| 9 | February 3, 2002 | @ Toronto Rock | Air Canada Centre | L 12–17 | | 14,515 | 6–3 |
| 10 | February 9, 2001 | @ Rochester Knighthawks (1995–2019) | Blue Cross Arena | L 10–13 | | 8,349 | 6–4 |
| 11 | February 17, 2001 | Rochester Knighthawks (1995-2019) | Bell Centre | L 16–21 | | 8,101 | 6–5 |
| 12 | February 23, 2001 | @ Vancouver Ravens | General Motors Place | L 11–16 | | 9,084 | 6–6 |
| 13 | March 2, 2002 | @ Columbus Landsharks | Nationwide Arena | W 12–10 | | 3,122 | 7–6 |
| 14 | March 8, 2002 | Toronto Rock | Bell Centre | W 15–9 | | 9,339 | 8–6 |
| 15 | March 15, 2002 | Albany Attack | Bell Centre | L 13–14 | | 7,346 | 8–7 |
| 16 | March 24, 2002 | @ Albany Attack | Times Union Center | L 6–14 | | 3,562 | 8–8 |
