= Roy Condon =

American lacrosse referee

Roy A. Condon (born Watertown, Massachusetts) is a former lacrosse referee. He started officiating in 1971 and has officiated in all levels up to professional leagues and international championships. Officiated in the National Lacrosse League (NLL) from 1989 to 2011 and Major League Lacrosse (MLL) from 2000 to 2015. He officiated in seven NCAA Division I Men's Lacrosse Championship games and international competitions such as the 1990 World Lacrosse Championship and the 1999 Under-19 World Lacrosse Championships.

Condon was inducted into the National Lacrosse Hall of Fame in 2020 and the National Lacrosse League Hall of Fame in 2021. In 1995, he was named to the NCAA's Silver Anniversary Team. In 1996, he was named to US Lacrosse New England Chapter's Hall of Fame.

In college, Condon played for UMass Minutemen lacrosse.
