= Terry Sanderson (lacrosse) =

Canadian lacrosse executive (1952–2014)

Terry Sanderson (August 22, 1952 – November 27, 2014) was the general manager of the Toronto Rock of the National Lacrosse League and has also held various coaching positions through the NLL. He was a member of the Sanderson family of Orangeville, Ontario, which has produced a number of lacrosse players and coaches.

Sanderson began his NLL coaching career in 2000 with the Albany Attack. He coached the Attack for two seasons, compiling an 11–15 record. After the 2001 season, Sanderson resigned in order to take the head coach and GM position for the expansion Montreal Express. The Express only lasted a single season before folding.

In 2002, Sanderson replaced his brother Lindsay as head coach of the Ottawa Rebel. The Rebel finished the 2003 season last in the NLL at 4–12, and folded after the season.

Sanderson was inducted into the Canadian Lacrosse Hall of Fame as a builder in 2015.

== The Toronto Rock ==
Before the 2004 season began, Toronto Rock head coach and GM Les Bartley announced that he would not be behind the bench for the upcoming season due to his battle with colon cancer, and assistant coaches Ed Comeau and Derek Keenan were promoted to interim head coach and GM respectively. However, after beginning the season 2-4, Comeau and Keenan were fired, and Terry Sanderson was hired as the new GM and head coach. Sanderson turned the Rock around, guiding them to a 10-6 record and first place in the Eastern Division. They lost to Buffalo 19-10 in the division finals.

During the off-season, Sanderson made a blockbuster trade with GM Johnny Mouradian of the San Jose Stealth (himself a former Rock GM), acquiring his son Josh, nephew Phil, and Rusty Kruger for fan favourite Steve Toll, Darryl Gibson, two draft picks, and a player to be named later, who ended up being goaltender Anthony Cosmo. Any cries of "nepotism" were silenced during the next season, as Josh set a new single-season assists record with 71, and the Rock finished 12-4 and in first place in the Eastern division for the seventh straight year. They defeated the Rochester Knighthawks in the division finals, and then beat the Arizona Sting in the Championship game, held in Toronto, to win their fifth NLL championship in seven years. Former coach and GM Les Bartley died the day after the Championship game.

2006 was a disappointing season for the Rock, finishing with their worst record ever, 8-8, and losing to Rochester in the division semi-finals. Less than two weeks after the end of the regular season, Sanderson was fired.

== 2007 and beyond ==
Sanderson worked with his brother Lindsay once again during the 2007 season. Lindsay, the head coach and GM of the Philadelphia Wings, hired Terry as an assistant coach. Both were relieved of their coaching duties after the season as the Wings missed the playoffs for the fifth consecutive year.

On July 17, 2007, Sanderson was hired by the Calgary Roughnecks to be their defensive coach for the 2008 NLL season.

On June 10, 2009, after two seasons in Calgary, including the 2009 championship season, Sanderson was re-hired by the Rock as their new GM and assistant coach.

On November 13, 2014, Toronto Rock owner, Jamie Dawick, announced that Sanderson would be taking an indefinite leave of absence from his role as General Manager, with Dawick serving as the interim General Manager in his place.

== Death ==
On November 27, 2014, Toronto Rock owner, Jamie Dawick, confirmed, via Twitter, that Sanderson had died due to health issues.

== Personal life ==
Sanderson owned and operated Sanderson's Source for Sports, a hockey and lacrosse equipment store located in Orangeville.

== NLL head coaching statistics ==
Team	Season	Regular Season				Playoffs				Playoff result
Team	Season	GC	W	L	W%	GC	W	L	W%	Playoff result
Albany Attack	2000	12	6	6	.500	–	–	–	–	Did not qualify
Albany Attack	2001	14	5	9	.357	–	–	–	–	Did not qualify
Montreal Express	2002	16	8	8	.500	–	–	–	–	Did not qualify
Ottawa Rebel	2003	16	4	12	.250	–	–	–	–	Did not qualify
Toronto Rock	2004*	10	8	2	.800	1	0	1	.000	Lost Division Final (BUF)
Toronto Rock	2005	16	12	4	.750	2	2	0	1.000	Won Champions' Cup (ARZ)
Toronto Rock	2006	16	8	8	.500	1	0	1	.000	Lost Division Semifinal (ROC)
Totals:	7	100	51	49	.510	4	2	2	.500	

* - took over HC duties after February 13 from Derek Keenan
