= Defensive Player of the Year Award =

Defensive Player of the Year (DPOY or DPOTY) is the name of an award given in sports for outstanding defensive play by a single player over the course of a season. Many sports leagues award this type of award. League awards for Defensive Player of the Year is include:

== American football ==
=== Professional ===
- National Football League Defensive Player of the Year Award
  - Associated Press NFL Defensive Player of the Year Award
  - Newspaper Enterprise Association NFL Defensive Player of the Year Award (1966–1999)
  - Pro Football Writers of America NFL Defensive Player of the Year Award

=== College ===
- ACC Defensive Player of the Year
- Big East Conference Defensive Player of the Year
- Mid-American Conference Defensive Player of the Year
- Nagurski–Woodson Defensive Player of the Year
- STATS FCS Defensive Player of the Year

== Baseball ==
- Wilson Defensive Player of the Year Award
- Fielding Bible Defensive Player of the Year Award

== Basketball ==
=== Professional ===
- Basketball Champions League Defensive Player of the Year
- BAL Defensive Player of the Year
- DBL Defensive Player of the Year
- Israeli Basketball Premier League Defensive Player of the Year
- NBA Defensive Player of the Year Award
- NBA G League Defensive Player of the Year Award
- NBL Defensive Player of the Year
- NBL Canada Defensive Player of the Year Award
- Korisliiga Defensive Player of the Year
- Lega Basket Serie A Defensive Player of the Year
- ABA League Defensive Player of the Year
- New Zealand NBL Defensive Player of the Year Award
- PBA Defensive Player of the Year Award
- VTB United League Defensive Player of the Year
- Greek Basketball League Defensive Player of the Year
- WNBA Defensive Player of the Year Award
- WNBL Defensive Player of the Year Award
- KBL Defensive Player of the Year
- Úrvalsdeild Women's Defensive Player of the Year

=== College ===
- Big East Conference Men's Basketball Defensive Player of the Year
- Lefty Driesell Defensive Player of the Year Award
- NABC Defensive Player of the Year
- Naismith Defensive Player of the Year Award
- Pac-12 Conference Men's Basketball Defensive Player of the Year
- WBCA Defensive Player of the Year

== Ice hockey ==
- MAAC Defensive Player of the Year

== Lacrosse ==
- National Lacrosse League Defensive Player of the Year Award

== Softball ==
- Big 12 Conference Softball Defensive Player of the Year
