= Ottawa Rebel =

Former NLL box lacrosse team

- First season: 2001
- Team history: Syracuse Smash (1998–2000)
- Based in: Ottawa, Ontario
- Arena: Corel Centre (2001–02); Ottawa Civic Centre (2002–03)
- Colours: Black, grey, and red
- Formerly: Syracuse Smash

The Ottawa Rebel were a team in the National Lacrosse League based in Ottawa, Ontario from 2001 until 2003. They initially played at the Corel Centre (now called the Canadian Tire Centre), but part-way through the 2002 season moved to the smaller, but centrally located, Ottawa Civic Centre. From 1997 until 2000 the team was located in Syracuse, New York and was called the Syracuse Smash.

The Rebel was owned by the Brad Watters group which also brought lacrosse to Toronto and Montreal.

== History ==
In their first season in Ottawa, the Rebel had one win and thirteen losses and finished last of nine teams. Their second season was slightly better, with four wins and twelve losses, but due to tie breakers they finished fourth in the Northern Division and thirteenth overall behind the Calgary Roughnecks, who also finished with a 4–12 record. In their third and final year in Ottawa they again had four wins and twelve losses, placing them fourth in the Northern Division again but tenth out of twelve in the overall league standings.

As the Syracuse Smash, they were last overall in all three years — prompting the move to the Canadian capital.

The franchise became inactive after the 2003 season. In 2005, it was purchased by Bruce Urban and moved to Edmonton, Alberta, becoming the Edmonton Rush. In 2024, it was announced that the National Lacrosse League would return to Ottawa as the Ottawa Black Bears. The Blackbears lasted for two seasons without a winning record until the franchise folded after the conclusion of the 2025-2026 season due to ownership mismanagement which prompted the league to strip Ottawa of its team.

== All time Record ==
Season	Division	W-L	Finish	Home	Road	GF	GA	Coach	Playoffs
2001	None	1–13	9th	0–7	1–6	144	220	Mark Vitarelli	Missed playoffs
2002	Northern	4–12	4th	1–7	3–5	202	245	Marty Cooper, Lindsay Sanderson	Missed playoffs
2003	Northern	4–12	4th	3–5	1–7	174	215	Terry Sanderson	Missed playoffs
Total	3 seasons	9–37		4–19	5–18	520	680		

=== 2000-01 schedule ===
Game	Date	Opponent	Location	Score	OT	Attendance	Record
1	December 21, 2000	@ Toronto Rock	Air Canada Centre	L 7–17		13,333	0–1
2	December 29, 2000	@ Albany Attack	Times Union Center	L 7–14		4,921	0–2
3	January 5, 2001	Toronto Rock	Canadian Tire Centre	L 7–16		12,193	0–3
4	January 12, 2001	@ Philadelphia Wings	Wachovia Center	L 8–17		14,386	0–4
5	January 14, 2001	@ Washington Power	Capital One Arena	L 14–18		3,519	0–5
6	January 19, 2001	New York Saints	Canadian Tire Centre	L 8–9		7,893	0–6
7	January 26, 2001	@ Columbus Landsharks	Nationwide Arena	L 10–11		6,138	0–7
8	February 3, 2001	@ Buffalo Bandits	HSBC Arena	L 14–25		8,111	0–8
9	February 9, 2001	Albany Attack	Canadian Tire Centre	L 10–13		5,780	0–9
10	February 16, 2001	Buffalo Bandits	Canadian Tire Centre	L 12–21		7,083	0–10
11	March 2, 2001	Rochester Knighthawks	Canadian Tire Centre	L 11–17		7,420	0–11
12	March 18, 2001	Washington Power	Canadian Tire Centre	L 13–17		6,715	0–12
13	March 30, 2001	@ New York Saints	Nassau Veterans Memorial Coliseum	W 15–14		4,183	1–12
14	April 6, 2001	Columbus Landsharks	Canadian Tire Centre	L 8–11		9,325	1–13

=== 2001-02 schedule ===
Game	Date	Opponent	Location	Score	OT	Attendance	Record
1	November 18, 2001	Vancouver Ravens	Canadian Tire Centre	W 13–10		6,230	1–0
2	December 2, 2001	Calgary Roughnecks	Canadian Tire Centre	L 11–17		5,140	1–1
3	December 14, 2001	@ Toronto Rock	Air Canada Centre	L 6–12		14,169	1–2
4	December 21, 2001	Rochester Knighthawks	Canadian Tire Centre	L 10–14		4,654	1–3
5	January 4, 2002	Columbus Landsharks	Canadian Tire Centre	L 11–15		5,500	1–4
6	January 19, 2002	@ Albany Attack	Times Union Center	L 17–18		3,027	1–5
7	January 25, 2002	@ Montreal Express	Bell Centre	L 15–20		7,132	1–6
8	January 27, 2002	Montreal Express	Canadian Tire Centre	L 9–13		6,304	1–7
9	February 2, 2002	@ Vancouver Ravens	General Motors Place	L 10–21		9,613	1–8
10	February 9, 2002	@ Calgary Roughnecks	Scotiabank Saddledome	W 20–15		8,854	2–8
11	February 16, 2002	Toronto Rock	Canadian Tire Centre	L 8–15		7,826	2–9
12	March 2, 2002	@ Philadelphia Wings	Wachovia Center	L 17–19		14,016	2–10
13	March 7, 2002	Washington Power	Canadian Tire Centre	L 15–18		5,308	2–11
14	March 16, 2002	@ New Jersey Storm	Izod Center	W 12–10		6,535	3–11
15	March 23, 2002	@ New York Saints	Nassau Veterans Memorial Coliseum	W 17–16		5,452	4–11
16	March 24, 2002	New Jersey Storm	Canadian Tire Centre	L 11–12	OT	6,535	4–12

=== 2002-03 schedule ===
Game	Date	Opponent	Location	Score	OT	Attendance	Record
1	December 28, 2002	Calgary Roughnecks	Rona Centre	L 9–14		3,642	0–1
2	January 3, 2003	@ Columbus Landsharks	Nationwide Arena	L 13–14		2,103	0–2
3	January 4, 2003	@ New York Saints	Nassau Veterans Memorial Coliseum	W 16–12		4,274	1–2
4	January 11, 2003	Colorado Mammoth	Rona Centre	W 13–11		3,586	2–2
5	January 23, 2003	Toronto Rock	Rona Centre	L 6–15		2,794	2–3
6	February 1, 2003	New Jersey Storm	Rona Centre	W 12–8		2,713	3–3
7	February 7, 2003	@ Toronto Rock	Air Canada Centre	L 10–13		16,059	3–4
8	February 15, 2003	Philadelphia Wings	Rona Centre	W 11–9		4,816	4–4
9	February 28, 2003	@ Rochester Knighthawks	Blue Cross Arena	L 7–13		8,531	4–5
10	March 8, 2003	Vancouver Ravens	Rona Centre	L 10–13		6,267	4–6
11	March 15, 2003	@ New Jersey Storm	Izod Center	L 15–16		6,302	4–7
12	March 21, 2003	@ Buffalo Bandits	HSBC Arena	L 9–12		7,943	4–8
13	March 22, 2003	Buffalo Bandits	Rona Centre	L 9–11		4,512	4–9
14	March 28, 2003	@ Vancouver Ravens	General Motors Place	L 7–10		9,233	4–10
15	March 30, 2003	@ Calgary Roughnecks	Scotiabank Saddledome	L 16–26		10,603	4–11
16	April 12, 2003	Columbus Landsharks	Rona Centre	L 12–17		5,289	4–12
