= Les Bartley =

Canadian lacrosse coach (1954–2005)

- Born: March 11, 1954; St. Catharines, Ontario, Canada
- Died: May 15, 2005 (aged 51); St. Catharines, Ontario, Canada
- Occupation: lacrosse coach
- Known for: seven-time lacrosse champion

Les Bartley (March 11, 1954 – May 15, 2005) was a Canadian lacrosse coach. Bartley led the Buffalo Bandits to three of their four championships in the Major Indoor Lacrosse League (MILL), and won four more championships with the Toronto Rock in the renamed National Lacrosse League (NLL). He was named NLL Executive of the Year in 2005.

== Personal and early life ==
Bartley was born in St. Catharines, Ontario. He attended St. Catharines Collegiate, playing football and lacrosse. After graduating from high school, he worked at the GM plant in St. Catharines, and later became a union official.

== Coaching career ==
=== Buffalo Bandits ===
Bartley became the assistant coach of the Bandits in 1992. When the team started off the 1992 season 0-3, Bandits head coach Buff McCready was fired, and Bartley was given the job of head coach. He then led the team on a 22-game winning streak and MILL championships in 1992 and 1993. The streak included the entire 1993 season, during which the Bandits were 8-0, the only undefeated season in NLL/MILL history. The streak came to an end on February 19, 1994.

Bartley's only losing season as a professional lacrosse coach came in the 1995 season after going 3-5. In 1996, he coached the Bandits to their third championship in the MILL. After the 1997 season, Les left the Bandits after leading them to a 36–13 record in six seasons.

=== Toronto Rock ===
When the MILL became the NLL in 1998, the league added its first Canadian franchise: the Ontario Raiders, who played in Copps Coliseum in Hamilton, Ontario. Bartley, a native of nearby St. Catharines, Ontario, helped get the new franchise off the ground. In 1999, the Ontario Raiders moved to Toronto and became the Toronto Rock. Les coached the Rock to four championships in five years.

Prior to the 2005 season, Bartley lent his labour negotiation expertise to the league, helping the NLL to reach a collective bargaining agreement with the NLL players' association. On May 9, 2005, Bartley was named by the NLL as its Executive of the Year, and renamed its coach-of-the-year award the Les Bartley Trophy.

== Death ==
In November 2003, Les gave up his role of coach and general manager of the Rock to fight colon cancer, though he maintained the title of vice-president of the Rock. Bartley retired as a General Motors union representative in 2004.

Less than a week later after being named NLL Executive of the Year, Les Bartley died at his home on May 15, 2005, in St. Catharines after his 18-month battle with cancer. Bartley was 51. He died 18 hours after the Toronto Rock won their fifth NLL Championship. He was survived by his wife Gloria and children Matt and Laura.

=== Legacy ===
Bartley led the Rock to a 51–19 record in five seasons in the NLL, and 9–1 in the post-season. His overall record of 93–38 (.709) in the regular season is second all-time. Only current Buffalo Bandits coach Darris Kilgour has more. His 18–4 (.818) record in the playoffs is the most wins of any coach in NLL history.

In recognition of Bartley's contribution to the NLL and his success as a coach, the NLL renamed the annual Coach of the Year award as the Les Bartley Award. Fittingly, two of the first recipients of the renamed award were Derek Keenan of the Portland Lumberjax in 2006 and Ed Comeau of the Rochester Knighthawks in 2007, both former assistants of Bartley in Toronto.

In June 2005, the National Lacrosse League announced that Bartley would be a Charter member of the National Lacrosse League Hall of Fame. He was inducted into the Hall of Fame at the 2006 NLL All-Star Game in Toronto.

In March 2007, the Toronto Rock announced a new award in honour of Bartley. The Les Bartley Award (not to be confused with the Les Bartley Award given by the league) will be "given annually to the Rock player that best exemplifies Les' emphasis on the importance of character and commitment to the team".

== MILL/NLL head coaching statistics ==
Team	Season	Regular Season				Playoffs				Playoff result
Team	Season	GC	W	L	W%	GC	W	L	W%	Playoff result
Buffalo Bandits	1992*	5	5	0	1.000	3	3	0	1.000	Won North American Cup (PHI)
Buffalo Bandits	1993	8	8	0	1.000	2	2	0	1.000	Won North American Cup (PHI)
Buffalo Bandits	1994	8	6	2	.750	2	1	1	.500	Lost North American Cup (PHI)
Buffalo Bandits	1995	8	3	5	.375	1	0	1	.000	Lost Semifinal (PHI)
Buffalo Bandits	1996	10	8	2	.800	2	2	0	1.000	Won North American Cup (PHI)
Buffalo Bandits	1997	10	6	4	.600	2	1	1	.500	Lost North American Cup (ROC)
Ontario Raiders	1998	12	6	6	.500	–	–	–	–	Did not qualify
Toronto Rock	1999	12	9	3	.750	2	2	0	1.000	Won Champions' Cup (ROC)
Toronto Rock	2000	12	9	3	.750	2	2	0	1.000	Won Champions' Cup (ROC)
Toronto Rock	2001	14	11	3	.786	2	1	1	.500	Lost Champions' Cup (PHI)
Toronto Rock	2002	16	11	5	.688	2	2	0	1.000	Won Champions' Cup (ALB)
Toronto Rock	2003	16	11	5	.688	2	2	0	1.000	Won Champions' Cup (ROC)
Totals:	12	131	93	38	.710	22	18	4	.818	

* - Took over HC duties from Bob McCready
