= Toronto Rock =

Professional lacrosse team in Hamilton, Ontario, Canada

- Sport: Box lacrosse
- Founded: 1998
- League: National Lacrosse League
- Team history: Ontario Raiders (1998)
- Location: Hamilton, Ontario
- Arena: TD Coliseum
- Colours: Blue, red, silver, white
- Owner: Jamie Dawick
- Head coach: Matt Sawyer
- General manager: Jamie Dawick
- League titles: 7 (1999, 2000, 2002, 2003, 2005, 2011, 2026)
- Division titles: 9 (1999, 2000, 2001, 2002, 2003, 2005, 2010, 2011, 2015)
- Local media: TSN / TSN2; TSN Radio 1050
- Retired numbers: 3 (7, 29, 32)
- Website: torontorock.com

The Toronto Rock are a Canadian professional box lacrosse team based in Hamilton, Ontario, that competes in the National Lacrosse League (NLL). The team plays its home games at TD Coliseum. The Rock have won seven NLL championships, tied for the most in league history with the Buffalo Bandits.

The franchise was founded in 1998 as the Ontario Raiders in Hamilton, being the first Canadian based franchise in the NLL. The Raiders played at Copps Coliseum before being sold to a group of investors led by then Toronto Maple Leafs Assistant GM Bill Watters, who relocated the franchise to Toronto. They were subsequently renamed the "Toronto Rock", and began play at Maple Leaf Gardens in the 1999 season. In the 2001 season, the Rock moved from the Maple Leaf Gardens to Scotiabank Arena (then known as Air Canada Centre) where they played for 20 seasons. On May 11, 2021, the team announced the relocation from Scotiabank Arena in Toronto to FirstOntario Centre in Hamilton, beginning with the 2021–22 NLL season in December. The team continues to represent Toronto while playing home games in Hamilton. The Rock temporarily relocated to Mississauga for the 2025 season while the FirstOntario Centre was closed for renovations.

== History ==
The franchise was founded as an NLL expansion team in Hamilton, Ontario and began play in the 1998 season. They were known as the Ontario Raiders, and played their home games at Copps Coliseum. Former Buffalo Bandits coach Les Bartley was hired to coach the new team, and he lured former Bandit Jim Veltman to join him, becoming the Raiders' captain. The team finished a respectable 6–6 in their inaugural season, but missed the playoffs on a tie-breaker. Following the season, losses of $250,000 forced owner Chris Fritz to look for partners. Maple Leaf Sports & Entertainment considered purchasing the team, but ultimately a group which included Bill Watters, the then Assistant General Manager of the Toronto Maple Leafs, Paul Beeston, former president of the Toronto Blue Jays, Tie Domi, player for the Maple Leafs, and Bobby Orr, former NHL player, bought it for $250,000 and promptly relocated the team to Toronto's Maple Leaf Gardens where they rebranded it the Toronto Rock, a name chosen to reflect the city's lively rock music scene.

=== Championships/Dynasty era (1999–2005) ===
In 1999, their first year in Toronto, the Rock won their first NLL Championship, defeating the Rochester Knighthawks 13–10 in Toronto. The next year, the Rock became the first team since the 1994-95 Wings to win back-to-back championships, once again defeating the Knighthawks. That game featured Kaleb Toth's dramatic game-winning goal with a second left on the clock, in the last-ever professional sporting event held at Maple Leaf Gardens.

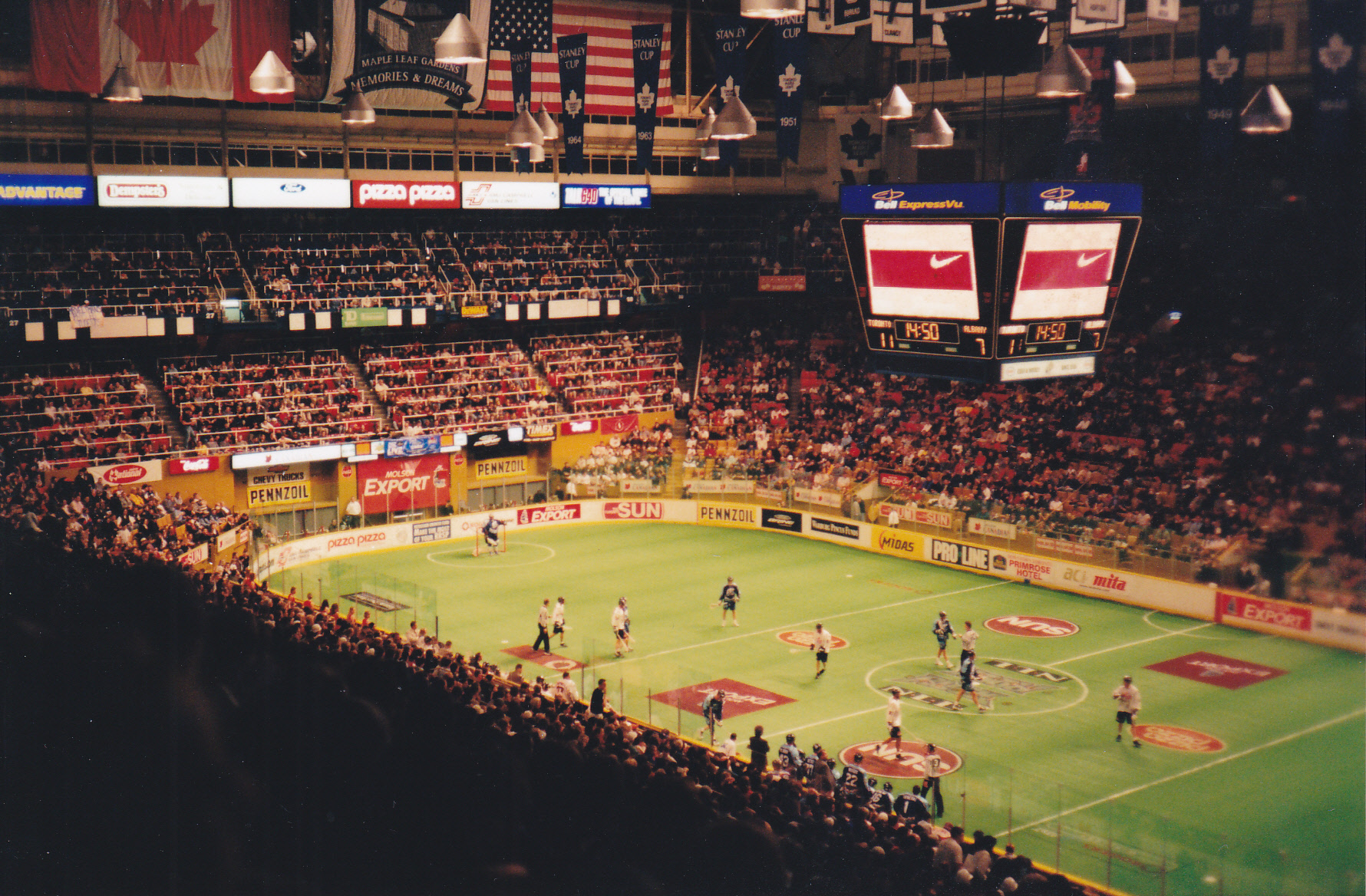
The Rock at Maple Leaf Gardens during the 2000 season

2001 saw the Rock follow the Leafs to the Air Canada Centre, where they advanced to the championship game once again. But the visiting Philadelphia Wings held the Rock to just eight goals, and won their sixth championship. The next season, the Rock recovered from the championship game loss by finishing first overall for the fourth straight year. They advanced to the championship game once again, but for the first time as the visiting team. The Rock defeated the Albany Attack in Albany 13–12. 2002 was also one of the most productive years for the Rock in terms of awards; in addition to winning the Champion's Cup, three players were honoured by the league. Blaine Manning was named Rookie of the Year, Pat Coyle was named Defensive Player of the Year, and captain Jim Veltman was given the Sportsmanship Award.

In 2003, Toronto advanced to the championship game for the fifth straight year, once again as the visitors. The game was held in Rochester, where Rock had never won a game, but they prevailed in the lowest-scoring championship game in NLL history, winning 8–6.

Shortly before the 2004 season began, head coach and GM Les Bartley announced that he was fighting colon cancer, and was stepping down. Assistant coaches Ed Comeau and Derek Keenan were named interim coach and interim GM respectively. After a 2–4 start to the season, Comeau and Keenan were fired, and the Rock hired Terry Sanderson to try to turn the team around. The Rock went 8-2 the rest of the season, earning a first round bye after clinching the East Division regular season crown. However, the Buffalo Bandits came to town and upset the Rock 19–10, sending the Bandits to the first NLL championship game not featuring the Rock since they joined the league. Jim Veltman was honoured by the league by being named league MVP. This was the first year in the 10-year history of the award that it did not go to Gary Gait, Paul Gait, or John Tavares and the first Toronto Rock player to be named league MVP.

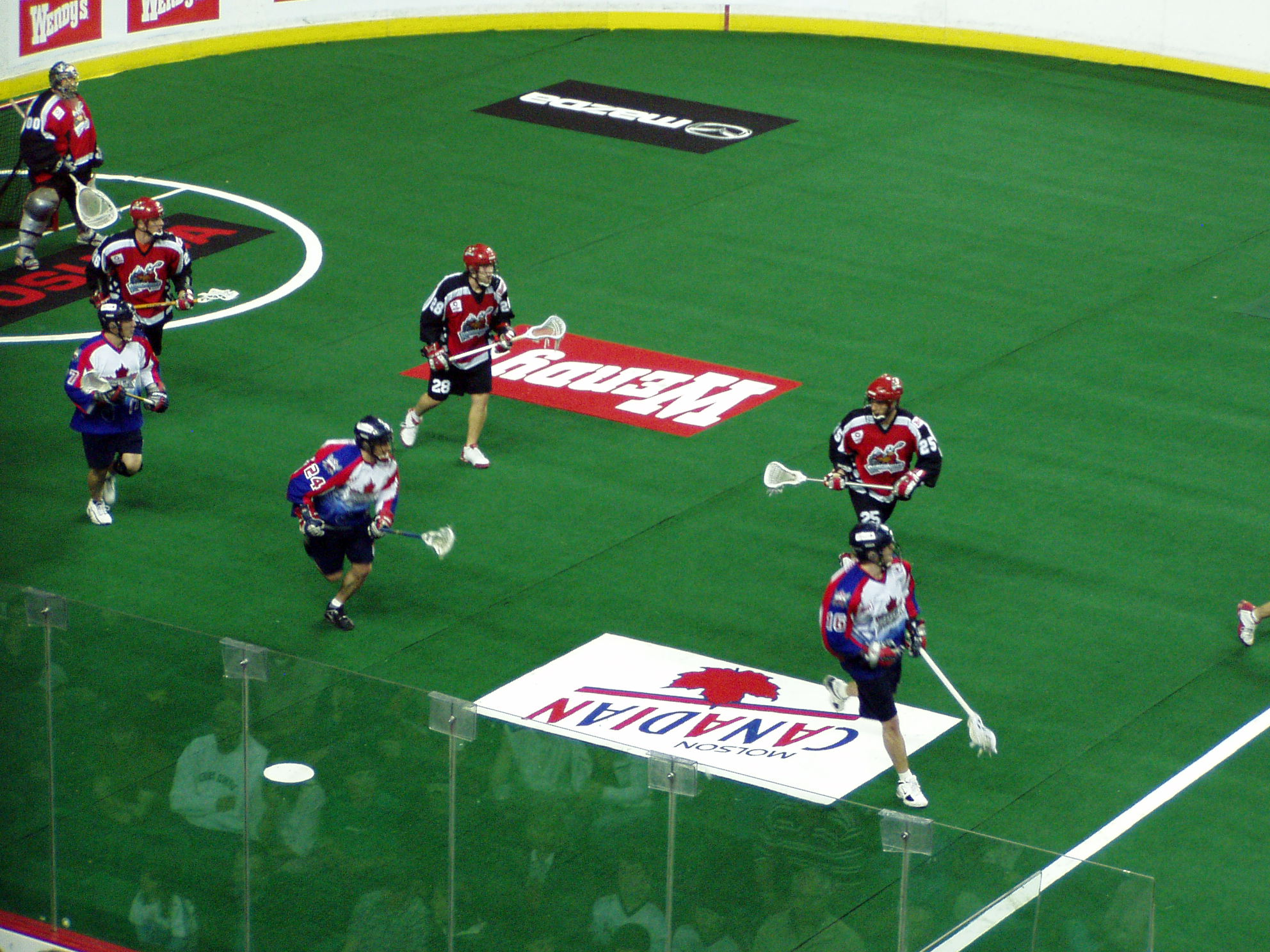
The Rock playing against the Calgary Roughnecks during the Rock's final game of the 2005 NLL season

In 2005, the Rock defeated the Rochester Knighthawks in the East Division Final by a score of 12–10 in front of approximately 17,200 fans at the Air Canada Centre. The Rock went on to defeat the Arizona Sting with a 19–13 win in front of an NLL record crowd of 19,432, becoming NLL champions for the fifth time in seven years and solidifying their distinction as an NLL dynasty. Colin Doyle was named league MVP, the second straight year that the award was won by a Rock player.

Despite the championship, the season ended on a sad note for the Rock franchise, as Les Bartley died of cancer at the age of 51 the day after the championship game. Bartley is remembered as an exceptional coach, having led the Toronto Rock to NLL Championships in 1999, 2000, 2002, and 2003.

In 2004, the NLL Coach of the Year Award was renamed the Les Bartley Award in honour of Bartley.

=== Kloepfer era (2006–2009) ===
From 1999 to 2005, the Rock finished either first overall or first in their division every year, winning five championships. The next few years, however, would bring the franchise back down to Earth. The Rock struggled during the early part of the 2006 season; however, their record balanced out to 8–8 at season's end. They made the playoffs, only to be defeated by the first place Knighthawks at Blue Cross Arena in Rochester by a score of 16–8. Head coach and GM Terry Sanderson was fired after the season, and was replaced by new Director of Lacrosse Operations Mike Kloepfer and new head coach Glenn Clark. Clark had played eight seasons with the Rock and had just finished an All-Star season as a member of the Philadelphia Wings, but retired from playing to take the head coaching job with his old club.

Kloepfer made his mark on the team quickly, trading perennial All-Star, former Rookie of the Year and league MVP Colin Doyle to the San Jose Stealth along with Darren Halls and a draft pick for first overall draft pick Ryan Benesch, Kevin Fines, Chad Thompson and two draft picks. Benesch had a very good rookie year, scoring 33 goals and winning the Rookie of the Year award, but the Rock under rookie coach Clark struggled to a worst-ever 6–10 record, barely making the playoffs. They lost the division semifinal against Rochester, who would go on to win their first championship since 1997.

In 2007, the Toronto Rock established an award also called the Les Bartley Award, given to "the Rock player that best exemplifies Les' emphasis on the importance of character and commitment to the team". The first winner of this award was team captain Jim Veltman.

Toronto's struggles continued in 2008, as the Rock lost their last five games of the season. They finished below .500 for the second straight year, and for the first time since their move to Toronto in 1999, the Rock finished out of the playoffs. Despite the losing season, goaltender Bob Watson was named Goaltender of the Year. 2008 also featured the final season of the only captain the Rock franchise had ever had, Jim Veltman. Veltman retired after fifteen seasons in the NLL, winning seven championships (two with the Bandits and five with the Rock). Chris Driscoll was named the new Rock captain.

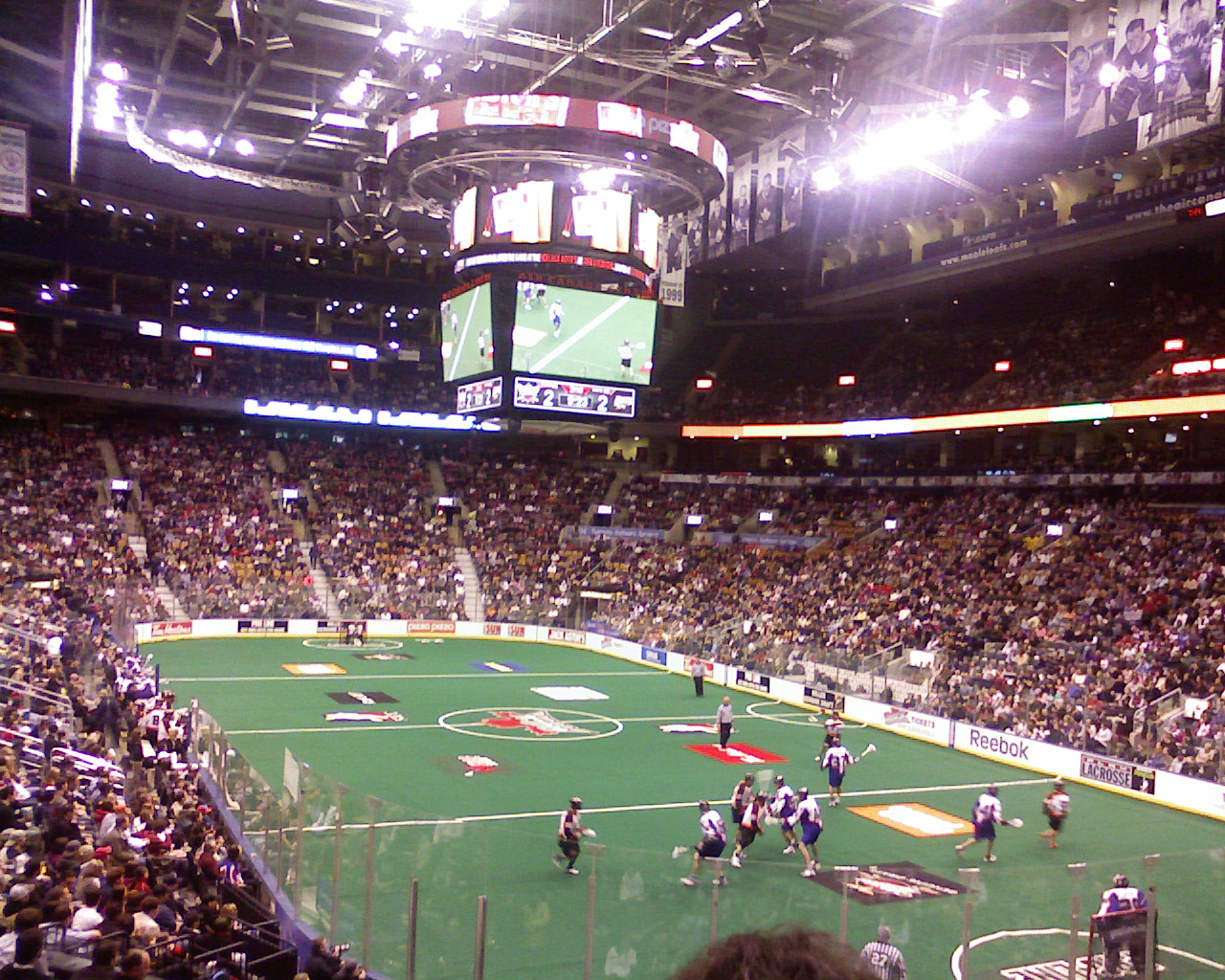
The Rock during their first home game of the 2009 NLL season, playing against the Buffalo Bandits

After starting the 2009 season with a 1–2 record, the Rock relieved Clark and assistant coach Veltman and Terry Bullen of their coaching duties, and hired former Chicago and Colorado coach Jamie Batley as the new Rock head coach. Clark and Bullen were fired, and Veltman was retained in an advisory position. The coaching change was not enough to propel the Rock back into the playoffs, however. They finished last in the East and out of the playoffs for the second straight year. Director of Lacrosse Operations Mike Kloepfer resigned shortly after the season ended.

=== Jamie Dawick era (2009–present) ===
On June 10, 2009, the Rock announced that former GM and coach Terry Sanderson had been brought back as the new GM. Jamie Batley was also told by the Rock that he would not be returning as head coach. At the end of the month, the team announced that the Rock had been sold to Oakville-based businessman James Dawick, with Waters saying the price was "in the seven figures." Two weeks later, former Calgary Roughnecks head coach Troy Cordingley was named as the new coach, giving the Rock an entirely new staff from ownership on down.

Sanderson wasted no time in the rebuilding efforts, most notably re-acquiring Colin Doyle from Washington in exchange for Lewis Ratcliff, Tyler Codron and Joel Dalgarno. He also traded Luke Wiles to Washington and Bill McGlone to Philadelphia, and re-acquiring former Rock defender Sandy Chapman from Rochester. He then traded team captain Chris Driscoll to the Buffalo Bandits for another former Rock defender Phil Sanderson, and acquired Mike Hominuck from Edmonton and Pat McCready from Buffalo, both for draft picks.

The moves paid off immediately, as the Rock began the 2010 season 6-1 en route to a 9–7 record. This was good for second place in the East and the Rock's first playoff berth in four years. In the playoffs, the Rock defeated Buffalo and Orlando on their way to their seventh Championship game, and first since 2005. The Washington Stealth, in their first season in Everett, Washington, proved too strong for the Rock and won the Championship 15–11.

In 2011, the Rock found themselves in the Championship game for the second straight year against the Washington Stealth, this time winning 8–7.

In August 2011, Dawick broke ground on constructing the new $20 million-dollar, privately financed Toronto Rock Athletic Centre (TRAC) in Oakville. The lacrosse facility, which opened in 2012, features two pads, one of which seats 500 fans, and serves as the Rock's practice facility as well as the team's offices. The arena has played host to exhibition NLL games, the NLL Entry Draft and the NLL Combine.

On May 11, 2021, Dawick announced that the Rock would relocate from Scotiabank Arena in Toronto to FirstOntario Centre in Hamilton, Ontario with a five-year arena lease with an option to extend the agreement afterwards. Their relocation will commence in time for the beginning of the 2022 NLL season in December 2021. The team name will not be changed despite the relocation to Hamilton due their branding as a team that has "always represented the GTHA". Toronto Rock also partners with local Canadian companies including Bachly Construction, Iceberg Vodka, Rheem Canada, and Rock Solid Lager.

It was originally announced that beginning in January 2024, the Rock would need to temporarily relocate their home games to the Paramount Fine Foods Centre in Mississauga, Ontario, as following their home games in December 2023 Hamilton's FirstOntario Centre would close for renovations for approximately two years. This also forced the Bulldogs (OHL) and Honey Badgers (CEBL) to relocate to Brantford and Brampton, respectively. However, in September 2023 it was announced that the renovations would be delayed and that the Toronto Rock would play the entirety of the 2023/24 season in Hamilton before temporarily relocating to Mississauga for the following season until the renovations are completed.

In 2026, the Rock once again won the Championship game against the Halifax Thunderbirds, winning their final game 12-7.

== Awards and honours ==
Year	Player	Award
1999	Colin Doyle	Champion's Cup MVP
2000	Dan Stroup	Champion's Cup MVP
2001	Bob Watson	Goaltender of the Year
2002	Blaine Manning	Rookie of the Year
2002	Pat Coyle	Defensive Player of the Year
2002	Jim Veltman	Sportsmanship Award
2002	Colin Doyle	Champion's Cup MVP
2003	Chris Driscoll	Sportsmanship Award
2003	Bob Watson	Champion's Cup MVP
2004	Jim Veltman	Most Valuable Player
2005	Colin Doyle	Most Valuable Player
2005	Les Bartley	Executive of the Year
2005	Colin Doyle	Champion's Cup MVP
2007	Ryan Benesch	Rookie of the Year
2008	Bob Watson	Goaltender of the Year
2010	Stephan Leblanc	Rookie of the Year
2011	Bob Watson	Champion's Cup MVP
2013	Garrett Billings	Sportsmanship Award
2013	Troy Cordingley	Les Bartley Award
2013	Jamie Dawick	Executive of the Year
2014	Garrett Billings	Sportsmanship Award
2015	Terry Sanderson	GM of the Year
2017	Brodie Merrill	Transition Player of the Year
2017	Tom Schreiber	Rookie of the Year
2019	Challen Rogers	Transition Player of the Year
2019	Terri Giberson	Executive of the Year
2020	Challen Rogers	Transition Player of the Year
2020	Dan Dawson	Teammate of the Year
2022	Mitch de Snoo	Defensive Player of the Year
2023	Latrell Harris	Defensive Player of the Year
2023	Dan Dawson	Teammate of the Year
2024	Nick Rose	Goaltender of the Year

=== Retired numbers ===
No.	Player	Date	Tenure
7	Colin Doyle	March 11, 2017	1999–2006, 2010–16
29	Bob Watson	February 24, 2012	1999–2011
32	Jim Veltman	April 12, 2019	1999–2008

=== NLL Hall of Fame members ===
- Les Bartley (Class of 2006)
- Johnny Mouradian (Class of 2008)
- Jim Veltman (Class of 2009)
- Dan Stroup (Class of 2010)
- Bob Watson (Class of 2011)
- Steve Dietrich (Class of 2012)
- Pat Coyle (Class of 2014)
- Terry Sanderson (Class of 2015)
- Josh Sanderson (Class of 2016)
- Colin Doyle (Class of 2021)
- Pat McCready (Class of 2021)
- Steve Toll (Class of 2021)

== Roster ==
Toronto Rock roster
Active (21-man) roster		Inactive roster	Coaches
Goaltenders: 92 (Canada) Troy Holowchuk; 35 (Canada) Dante Mancini; 30 (Canada) Steve Orleman; 66 (Canada) Nick Rose; Defensemen: 22 (Canada) Jake Darlison; 81 (United States) Elijah Gash; 16 (Canada) Kobe Handsor; 93 (Canada) Latrell Harris; 91 (Canada) Billy Hostrawser (A); 45 (Canada) Lucas Hucal; 44 (Canada) Josh Jackson; 33 (Canada) Josh Jubenville; 27 (Canada) Hugh Kelleher; 20 (Canada) Bradley Kri (A); 24 (Canada) Justin J. Martin; 55 (Canada) Chris Weier	Forwards: 21 (Germany) Chris Boushy; 25 (Canada) Dan Craig; 8 (Austria) Josh Dawick; 77 (Canada) Owen Hiltz; 5 (Canada) Zack Kearney; 1 (United States) CJ Kirst; 42 (Canada) Mark Matthews; 88 (Canada) Isiah Moran-Weekes; 23 (Canada) Challen Rogers (C); Transition: 15 (Canada) Sam English; 37 (Canada) Robert Hudson; 14 (Italy) Phil Mazzuca; 73 (United States) Nicholas Rowlett		Head coach: Matt Sawyer; Assistant coaches: Bruce Codd; Dan Dawson; Blaine Manning; Brandon Miller; Legend: * Suspended list; (C) Captain; (A) Alternate captain; Roster updated 2026-5-18; NLL Transactions

== All-time record ==
Season	Division/Conference (Note: Conference play began in the 2022 season, and ended with the 2024 season)	W	L	Finish	Home	Road	GF	GA	Coach	Playoffs
1999		9	3	1st	6–0	3–3	157	139	Les Bartley	Won NLL Championship
2000		9	3	1st	5–1	4–2	162	130	Les Bartley	Won NLL Championship
2001		11	3	1st	6–1	5–2	168	125	Les Bartley	Lost final
2002	Northern	11	5	1st	8–0	3–5	223	176	Les Bartley	Won NLL Championship
2003	Northern	11	5	1st	6–2	5–3	195	164	Les Bartley	Won NLL Championship
2004	Eastern	10	6	1st	5–3	5–3	202	176	ED Comeau/Terry Sanderson	Lost division final
2005	Eastern	12	4	1st	6–2	6–2	227	190	Terry Sanderson	Won NLL Championship
2006	Eastern	8	8	3rd	5–3	3–5	182	179	Terry Sanderson	Lost division semi-final
2007	Eastern	6	10	4th	3–5	3–5	187	183	Glenn Clark	Lost division semi-final
2008	Eastern	7	9	6th	4–5	3–4	172	174	Glenn Clark	Did not qualify
2009	Eastern	6	10	6th	3–5	3–5	194	218	Glenn Clark/Jamie Batley	Did not qualify
2010	Eastern	9	7	2nd	6–2	3–5	197	156	Troy Cordingley	Lost final
2011	Eastern	10	6	2nd	7–1	3–5	187	168	Troy Cordingley	Won NLL Championship
2012	Eastern	9	7	1st	3–5	6–2	198	196	Troy Cordingley	Lost division final
2013	Eastern	10	6	1st	5–3	5–3	194	176	Troy Cordingley	Lost division semi-final
2014	Eastern	9	9	2nd	6–3	3–6	219	213	John Lovell	Lost division semi-final
2015	Eastern	14	4	1st	7–2	7–2	230	185	John Lovell	Lost final
2016	Eastern	5	13	5th	4–5	1–8	190	224	John Lovell	Did not qualify
2017	Eastern	9	9	2nd	4–5	5–4	219	200	Matt Sawyer	Lost division final
2018	Eastern	8	10	4th	3–6	5–4	237	216	Matt Sawyer	Did not qualify
2019	Eastern	12	6	3rd	8–1	4–5	213	207	Matt Sawyer	Lost division final
2020 (Note: 2020 regular season shortened and playoffs cancelled due to the COVID-19 pandemic.)	North	7	4	2nd	4–2	3–2	122	106	Matt Sawyer	No playoffs held
2021	Eastern	Season cancelled due to COVID-19 pandemic								
2022	Eastern	13	5	2nd	7–2	6–3	207	166	Matt Sawyer	Lost conference final
2023	Eastern	13	5	2nd	8–1	5–4	234	164	Matt Sawyer	Lost conference final
2024		15	3	1st	7–2	8–1	218	169	Matt Sawyer	Lost semi-finals
2025		6	12	13th	2–7	4–5	189	208	Matt Sawyer	Did not qualify
2026		11	7	6th	6–3	5–4	195	186	Matt Sawyer	Won NLL Championship
Total	27 seasons	260	179		150–79	117–101	5,318	4,794		
Playoff totals	21 appearances	29	21		22–10	7–11	558	560	7 championships	

== Playoff results ==
Season	Game	Visiting	Home
1999	Semifinals	Philadelphia 2	Toronto 13
1999	Championship	Rochester 10	Toronto 13
2000	Semifinals	Philadelphia 10	Toronto 14
2000	Championship	Rochester 13	Toronto 14
2001	Semifinals	Washington 9	Toronto 10
2001	Championship	Philadelphia 9	Toronto 8
2002	Semifinals	Washington 11	Toronto 12
2002	Championship	Toronto 13	Albany 12
2003	Semifinals	Colorado 11	Toronto 15
2003	Championship	Toronto 8	Rochester 6
2004	Division Final	Buffalo 19	Toronto 10
2005	Division Final	Rochester 10	Toronto 12
2005	Championship	Arizona 13	Toronto 19
2006	Division Semifinals	Toronto 8	Rochester 16
2007	Division Semifinals	Toronto 6	Rochester 10
2010	Division Semifinal	Buffalo 11	Toronto 13
2010	Division Final	Toronto 15	Orlando 10
2010	Championship	Toronto 11	Washington 15
2011	Division Semifinal	Rochester 8	Toronto 10
2011	Division Final	Toronto 12	Buffalo 11
2011	Championship	Washington 7	Toronto 8
2012	Division Semifinal	Buffalo 6	Toronto 7
2012	Division Final	Rochester 17	Toronto 13
2013	Division Semifinal	Minnesota 20	Toronto 11
2014	Division Semifinal	Buffalo 15	Toronto 13
2015	Division Final 1	Toronto 9	Rochester 10
2015	Division Final 2	Rochester 8	Toronto 11
2015	Division Final 3	Rochester 2	Toronto 8
2015	Championship 1	Edmonton 15	Toronto 9
2015	Championship 2	Toronto 10	Edmonton 11
2017	Division Semifinal	New England 10	Toronto 18
2017	Division Final 1	Georgia 11	Toronto 8
2017	Division Final 2	Toronto 9	Georgia 13
2019	Division Semifinal	Toronto 16	Georgia 14
2019	Division Final	Toronto 8	Buffalo 12
2022	Conference Semifinal	Halifax 13	Toronto 14
2022	Conference Final	Toronto 17	Buffalo 18
2022	Conference Final	Buffalo 10	Toronto 9
2023	Conference Semifinal	Halifax 11	Toronto 15
2023	Conference Final	Toronto 5	Buffalo 14
2023	Conference Final	Buffalo 17	Toronto 8
2024	Quarterfinal	Rochester 6	Toronto 9
2024	Semi-final Game 1	Buffalo 12	Toronto 4
2024	Semi-final Game 2	Toronto 8	Buffalo 10
2026	Quarterfinals	Toronto 16	Saskatchewan 13
2026	Semi-final Game 1	San Diego 12	Toronto 14
2026	Semi-final Game 2	Toronto 6	San Diego 11
2026	Semi-final Game 3	San Diego 8	Toronto 14
2026	NLL Finals Game 1	Halifax 11	Toronto 13
2026	NLL Finals Game 2	Toronto 12	Halifax 7

== Head coaching history ==
#	Name	Term	Regular season				Playoffs			
#	Name	Term	GC	W	L	W%	GC	W	L	W%
1	Les Bartley	1999–2003	70	51	19	.729	10	9	1	.900
2	Ed Comeau	2004	6	2	4	.333	—	—	—	—
3	Terry Sanderson	2004–2006	42	28	14	.667	4	2	2	.500
4	Glenn Clark	2007–2009	31	12	19	.387	1	0	1	.000
5	Terry Bullen †	2008	4	2	2	.500	—	—	—	—
6	Jamie Batley	2009	13	5	8	.385	0	0	0	—
7	Troy Cordingley	2010–2013	64	38	26	.594	9	6	3	.667
8	John Lovell	2014–2016	54	28	26	.519	6	2	4	.333
9	Matt Sawyer	2017–	148	94	61	.606	20	10	10	.500

† Bullen served as head coach during Clark's suspension.

== See also ==
- Toronto Rock seasons
- Sports in Hamilton, Ontario

Preceded by Philadelphia Wings	National Lacrosse League Champions; 1999, 2000	Succeeded by Philadelphia Wings
Preceded by Philadelphia Wings	National Lacrosse League Champions; 2002, 2003	Succeeded by Calgary Roughnecks
Preceded by Calgary Roughnecks	National Lacrosse League Champions; 2005	Succeeded by Colorado Mammoth
Preceded by Washington Stealth	National Lacrosse League Champions; 2011	Succeeded by Rochester Knighthawks
Preceded by Buffalo Bandits	National Lacrosse League Champions; 2026	Succeeded by incumbent
