= Kaleb Toth =

Canadian lacrosse player

Personal information
- Nickname: Niner
- Born: August 8, 1977 (age 49) Calgary, Alberta, Canada
- Height: 6 ft 0 in (183 cm)
- Weight: 190 lb (86 kg; 13 st 8 lb)

Sport
- Position: Forward
- Shoots: Right
- NLL draft: 2nd overall, 1998; Toronto Rock
- NLL teams: Calgary Roughnecks; Toronto Rock
- WLA team: Nanaimo Timbermen
- Pro career: 2000–2012

Kaleb Toth (born August 8, 1977) is a Canadian former professional lacrosse player. He played for the Toronto Rock and Calgary Roughnecks of the National Lacrosse League (NLL). He is now an assistant coach for the Vancouver Warriors of the NLL.

== Professional career ==
Toth was the second overall draft pick in the 1999 NLL draft by the Toronto Rock and he played with them for two seasons. A game-winning goal by Toth in the last remaining second of play won the Rock their second straight Champion's Cup with a win over the Rochester Knighthawks in 2000. This goal was the last goal (in any sport) ever scored at Maple Leaf Gardens.

After the 2001 NLL season, Toth was traded to the expansion Calgary Roughnecks for first-round draft pick Blaine Manning. A Calgary native, Toth played minor lacrosse with Calgary's Axemen Lacrosse Club. He then went on to play for the Victoria Shamrocks, where he was named both rookie of the year and most sportsmanlike player in 1999. That year he led the Western Lacrosse Association with 52 goals in 17 games and was third overall in scoring with 83 points. He also had a reputation for owning one of the hardest shots in the league, a skill he confirmed by coming in near the top of several 'Hardest Shot' contests at NLL All-Star games.

He retired from the NLL on December 12, 2012. Kaleb played for the Calgary Roughnecks for eleven seasons, making him the longest-tenured member of the franchise to date.

== Hockey career ==
Toth has also played hockey in the Western Hockey League (Prince Albert Raiders, Moose Jaw Warriors & Lethbridge Hurricanes) and ECHL (Baton Rouge Kingfish & Chesapeake Icebreakers).

== Statistics ==
=== NLL ===
Kaleb Toth		Regular season									Playoffs								
Season	Team	GP	G	A	Pts	LB	PIM	Pts/GP	LB/GP	PIM/GP	GP	G	A	Pts	LB	PIM	Pts/GP	LB/GP	PIM/GP
2000	Toronto Rock	12	18	22	40	54	10	3.33	4.50	0.83	2	4	6	10	6	4	5.00	3.00	2.00
2001	Toronto Rock	14	23	22	45	81	10	3.21	5.79	0.71	2	5	0	5	18	2	2.50	9.00	1.00
2002	Calgary Roughnecks	16	38	41	79	86	15	4.94	5.38	0.94	–	–	–	–	–	–	–	–	–
2003	Calgary Roughnecks	16	31	30	61	97	20	3.81	6.06	1.25	1	0	1	1	9	0	1.00	9.00	0.00
2004	Calgary Roughnecks	16	33	27	60	58	8	3.75	3.63	0.50	3	5	10	15	12	2	5.00	4.00	0.67
2005	Calgary Roughnecks	16	38	34	72	93	14	4.50	5.81	0.88	1	2	2	4	5	0	4.00	5.00	0.00
2006	Calgary Roughnecks	16	22	33	55	69	27	3.44	4.31	1.69	1	1	4	5	5	0	5.00	5.00	0.00
2007	Calgary Roughnecks	16	28	47	75	53	24	4.69	3.31	1.50	1	2	0	2	2	0	2.00	2.00	0.00
2008	Calgary Roughnecks	15	19	31	50	57	4	3.33	3.80	0.27	2	6	4	10	8	0	5.00	4.00	0.00
2009	Calgary Roughnecks	16	33	47	80	70	13	5.00	4.38	0.81	3	4	11	15	17	2	5.00	5.67	0.67
2010	Calgary Roughnecks	10	13	22	35	29	13	3.50	2.90	1.30	1	1	0	1	3	0	1.00	3.00	0.00
2011	Calgary Roughnecks	16	16	37	53	41	11	3.31	2.56	0.69	2	1	2	3	4	4	1.50	2.00	2.00
2012	Calgary Roughnecks	7	3	5	8	8	7	1.14	1.14	1.00	1	0	0	0	0	0	0.00	0.00	0.00
		186	315	398	713	796	176	3.83	4.28	0.95	20	31	40	71	89	14	3.55	4.45	0.70
Career Total:		206	346	438	784	885	190	3.81	4.30	0.92									

GP–Games played; G–Goals; A–Assists; Pts–Points; LB–Loose balls; PIM–Penalty minutes; Pts/GP–Points per games played; LB/GP–Loose balls per games played; PIM/GP–Penalty minutes per games played.
