= Pat Coyle (lacrosse) =

Canadian lacrosse player

Personal information
- Nickname: King
- Born: September 17, 1969 (age 56) Orangeville, ON, CAN
- Height: 6 ft 0 in (183 cm)
- Weight: 220 lb (100 kg; 15 st 10 lb)

Sport
- Position: Defense
- Shoots: Left
- NLL teams: Colorado Mammoth; Vancouver Ravens; Toronto Rock; Ontario Raiders; Detroit Turbos
- Pro career: 1994–2008

Pat Coyle (born September 17, 1969 in Orangeville, Ontario) is a retired lacrosse player. He was inducted into the NLL Hall of Fame in 2014 and the Canadian Lacrosse Hall of Fame in 2017.

In his National Lacrosse League career, Coyle played for the Detroit Turbos, the Ontario Raiders, the Toronto Rock, and the Colorado Mammoth. Coyle was named Defensive Player of the Year in 2002, and won five NLL Championships; four with the Toronto Rock and one with the Colorado Mammoth. He has been the head coach of the Colorado Mammoth since 2017.

== Professional career ==
In 1994, Coyle played with the Detroit Turbos of the MILL, but was suspended indefinitely from the MILL for striking a referee. When the MILL became the NLL in 1998, it was decided that the suspension did not apply to the new league, and Coyle was signed by the Ontario Raiders. The Raiders became the Toronto Rock the next season, and Coyle went on to win four championships with the Rock before being traded to the Vancouver Ravens after the 2004 season. However, just weeks before the 2005 season began, the league announced that the Ravens would not play in 2005, and Coyle immediately became a free agent. He was signed by the Colorado Mammoth, where he won his fifth championship in 2006. During the 2008 season, Coyle announced that he would be retiring after the season.

Capturing the league's first-ever Defensive Player of the Year honors in 2002, he was later named to the Mammoth's All-Decade Team in 2012 and eventually became the first defenseman in NLL history to be inducted into the NLL Hall of Fame in 2014. Coyle joined his 2006 championship winning teammates in the Canadian Lacrosse Hall of Fame Class of 2017.

As a coach, Coyle was originally hired during the 2014 season to coach alongside Chris Gill and Dan Stroup as a collective unit, he was named head coach in 2018.

== Statistics ==
=== NLL ===
Pat Coyle		Regular season									Playoffs								
Season	Team	GP	G	A	Pts	LB	PIM	Pts/GP	LB/GP	PIM/GP	GP	G	A	Pts	LB	PIM	Pts/GP	LB/GP	PIM/GP
1994	Detroit Turbos	6	3	3	6	23	25	1.00	3.83	4.17	1	0	0	0	7	19	0.00	7.00	19.00
1998	Ontario Raiders	8	0	8	8	51	48	1.00	6.38	6.00	–	–	–	–	–	–	–	–	–
1999	Toronto Rock	11	6	5	11	82	43	1.00	7.45	3.91	2	1	1	2	15	16	1.00	7.50	8.00
2000	Toronto Rock	10	3	7	10	66	39	1.00	6.60	3.90	2	0	1	1	11	18	0.50	5.50	9.00
2001	Toronto Rock	14	4	10	14	104	65	1.00	7.43	4.64	2	0	1	1	15	9	0.50	7.50	4.50
2002	Toronto Rock	15	4	12	16	109	60	1.07	7.27	4.00	2	0	1	1	25	4	0.50	12.50	2.00
2003	Toronto Rock	16	2	10	12	99	31	0.75	6.19	1.94	2	1	2	3	6	10	1.50	3.00	5.00
2004	Toronto Rock	16	1	13	14	86	19	0.88	5.38	1.19	1	0	1	1	6	2	1.00	6.00	2.00
2005	Colorado Mammoth	16	2	15	17	88	21	1.06	5.50	1.31	1	0	0	0	3	2	0.00	3.00	2.00
2006	Colorado Mammoth	15	1	11	12	97	6	0.80	6.47	0.40	3	0	2	2	16	2	0.67	5.33	0.67
2007	Colorado Mammoth	12	1	3	4	61	4	0.33	5.08	0.33	1	1	0	1	8	0	1.00	8.00	0.00
2008	Colorado Mammoth	15	1	8	9	74	14	0.60	4.93	0.93	1	0	0	0	7	0	0.00	7.00	0.00
		154	28	105	133	940	375	0.86	6.10	2.44	18	3	9	12	119	82	0.67	6.61	4.56
Career Total:		172	31	114	145	1,059	457	0.84	6.16	2.66									

GP–Games played; G–Goals; A–Assists; Pts–Points; LB–Loose balls; PIM–Penalty minutes; Pts/GP–Points per games played; LB/GP–Loose balls per games played; PIM/GP–Penalty minutes per games played.

=== NLL head coaching statistics ===
Team	Season	Regular Season				Playoffs				Playoff result
Team	Season	GC	W	L	W%	GC	W	L	W%	Playoff result
Colorado Mammoth	2014*	18	8	10	.444	1	0	1	.000	Lost Division Semifinals (CGY)
Colorado Mammoth	2015**	18	9	9	.500	1	0	1	.000	Lost Division Semifinals (CGY)
Colorado Mammoth	2016**	18	12	6	.667	1	0	1	.000	Lost Division Semifinals (CGY)
Colorado Mammoth	2017**	18	9	9	.500	3	1	2	.333	Lost Western Finals (SSK)
Colorado Mammoth	2018	18	11	7	.611	1	0	1	.000	Lost Division Semifinals (CGY)
Colorado Mammoth	2019	18	6	12	.333	2	1	1	.500	Lost Western Division Final (CGY)
Colorado Mammoth	2020	13	7	6	.538	–	–	–	–	Season suspended due to the COVID-19 pandemic
Colorado Mammoth	2022	18	10	8	.556	7	5	2	.714	Won NLL Finals (BUF)
Colorado Mammoth	2023	18	9	9	.500	7	4	3	.571	Lost NLL Finals (BUF)
Colorado Mammoth	2024	18	5	13	.278	–	–	–	–	Did not qualify
Colorado Mammoth	2025	18	8	10	.444	–	–	–	–	Did not qualify
Colorado Mammoth	2026	18	12	6	.667	1	0	1	.000	Lost Quarterfinals (SD)
Totals:	12	211	106	105	.502	24	11	13	.458	

* - Shared head coaching duties with Bob Hamley, Chris Gill, and Dan Stroup

** - Shared head coaching duties with Chris Gill and Dan Stroup

Preceded by none	NLL Defensive Player of the Year; 2002	Succeeded by Jim Moss
