= Glenn Clark =

Canadian lacrosse player and coach

Personal information
- Nickname: The Professor
- Nationality: Canadian
- Born: December 1, 1969 (age 56) Pickering, Ontario
- Height: 6 ft 2 in (188 cm)
- Weight: 211 lb (96 kg; 15 st 1 lb)

Sport
- Position: Defender
- Shoots: Left
- NLL draft: 27th overall, 1997; Ontario Raiders
- NLL teams: Philadelphia Wings; Toronto Rock; Ontario Raiders
- Pro career: 1998–2006

Glenn Clark (born December 1, 1969, in Pickering, Ontario) is the head coach of the Oshawa FireWolves (previously the Albany FireWolves) and the former head coach of the Toronto Rock of the National Lacrosse League. He was also a former NLL player. Clark played in the NLL from 1998-2006 for both the Rock and the Philadelphia Wings. With the Rock, Clark won five NLL Championships. He also appeared in three National Lacrosse League All-Star Games, two with the Rock, and one with the Wings. In 2003, Clark played for Team Canada as they won the World Indoor Lacrosse Championships. In 2011, he became goaltending coach for Team Canada. Glenn played for the Eastenders ball hockey team out of Toronto, Ontario from 2013 to 2016

Off the floor, Clark was a former physical education teacher at Bayview Secondary School in Richmond Hill, Ontario before his retirement in 2019. He currently has 4 kids, one drafted in the 2022 NLL draft.

== Biography ==
Clark first played lacrosse for Ajax at the age of nine. He played five years of Junior lacrosse, three and one half years for Scarborough and one and one half years for Whitby.

Clark was called up in 1990 to help Brooklin win the Mann Cup, and was drafted by the Redmen in 1991, scoring 55 goals and 126 assists plus 467 PIM in 190 games, including a brief stint for Brantford in the "old" NLL in 1991. Glenn was the Defensive Player of the Year for Brooklin all five of the summers in which he played the full schedule.

=== NLL career ===
Clark was drafted by the Ontario Raiders, and played in 1998, the Raiders' only season. The next year, the Raiders moved to Toronto, becoming the Toronto Rock. Clark played seven seasons with the Rock, helping lead them to five NLL championships (1999, 2000, 2002, 2003, and 2005). Clark appeared in two All-Star Games as a member of the Rock, in 2004 and 2005. After the 2005 season, Clark signed as a free agent with the Philadelphia Wings. He played the 2006 season as a member of the Wings and was selected to the All-Star team for a third time.

After the 2006 season, Clark was offered the position of head coach of the Toronto Rock, and immediately retired from playing to take the job. His debut season with the Rock was not as successful as Clark was hoping for; the Rock opened the season with three straight losses before climbing to a final 6–10 record. This was good enough to make the playoffs, but the Rock were beaten 10-6 by the eventual Champion's Cup-winning Rochester Knighthawks.

On January 11, 2008, the Minnesota Swarm defeated the Toronto Rock 17–16 in overtime. After the game, Clark was involved in an altercation with Minnesota forward Sean Pollock outside the Rock dressing room. Clark was later charged with assault by Toronto Police. On January 17, the NLL announced that Clark was suspended indefinitely. The charges against Clark were eventually dropped, and the suspension was lifted on February 13.

The Rock won their 2009 season opener against the New York Titans, but after they lost their next two games, scoring a total of only 15 goals, Clark was fired on January 20, 2009, along with assistant coach Terry Bullen. Assistant coach Jim Veltman was retained by the Rock in an advisory position. Clark was replaced with Jamie Batley.

On June 24, 2015, Clark was named the second head coach of the New England Black Wolves, joined by assistants Jim Veltman and Tracey Kelusky.

== Statistics ==
=== NLL ===
| Glenn Clark | | Regular season | | | | | | | | | Playoffs | | | | | | | | |
| Season | Team | GP | G | A | Pts | LB | PIM | Pts/GP | LB/GP | PIM/GP | GP | G | A | Pts | LB | PIM | Pts/GP | LB/GP | PIM/GP |
|---|---|---|---|---|---|---|---|---|---|---|---|---|---|---|---|---|---|---|---|
| 1998 | Ontario Raiders | 3 | 0 | 1 | 1 | 10 | 8 | 0.33 | 3.33 | 2.67 | – | – | – | – | – | – | – | – | – |
| 1999 | Toronto Rock | 5 | 0 | 1 | 1 | 27 | 10 | 0.20 | 5.40 | 2.00 | 2 | 2 | 1 | 3 | 18 | 0 | 1.50 | 9.00 | 0.00 |
| 2000 | Toronto Rock | 12 | 7 | 10 | 17 | 94 | 24 | 1.42 | 7.83 | 2.00 | 2 | 3 | 3 | 6 | 16 | 2 | 3.00 | 8.00 | 1.00 |
| 2001 | Toronto Rock | 7 | 5 | 2 | 7 | 67 | 16 | 1.00 | 9.57 | 2.29 | 2 | 0 | 2 | 2 | 17 | 2 | 1.00 | 8.50 | 1.00 |
| 2002 | Toronto Rock | 16 | 10 | 7 | 17 | 98 | 19 | 1.06 | 6.13 | 1.19 | 2 | 1 | 5 | 6 | 21 | 6 | 3.00 | 10.50 | 3.00 |
| 2003 | Toronto Rock | 12 | 3 | 6 | 9 | 79 | 36 | 0.75 | 6.58 | 3.00 | 2 | 1 | 0 | 1 | 11 | 2 | 0.50 | 5.50 | 1.00 |
| 2004 | Toronto Rock | 13 | 3 | 2 | 5 | 60 | 31 | 0.38 | 4.62 | 2.38 | 1 | 0 | 0 | 0 | 4 | 7 | 0.00 | 4.00 | 7.00 |
| 2005 | Toronto Rock | 8 | 3 | 2 | 5 | 43 | 18 | 0.63 | 5.38 | 2.25 | – | – | – | – | – | – | – | – | – |
| 2006 | Philadelphia Wings | 16 | 2 | 10 | 12 | 79 | 41 | 0.75 | 4.94 | 2.56 | – | – | – | – | – | – | – | – | – |
| | | 92 | 33 | 41 | 74 | 557 | 203 | 0.80 | 6.05 | 2.21 | 11 | 7 | 11 | 18 | 87 | 19 | 1.64 | 7.91 | 1.73 |
| Career Total: | | 103 | 40 | 52 | 92 | 644 | 222 | 0.89 | 6.25 | 2.16 | | | | | | | | | |

GP–Games played; G–Goals; A–Assists; Pts–Points; LB–Loose balls; PIM–Penalty minutes; Pts/GP–Points per games played; LB/GP–Loose balls per games played; PIM/GP–Penalty minutes per games played.

=== NLL coaching statistics ===
| Team | Season | Regular Season | | | | Playoffs | | | | Playoff result |
| Team | Season | GC | W | L | W% | GC | W | L | W% | Playoff result |
|---|---|---|---|---|---|---|---|---|---|---|
| Toronto Rock | 2007 | 16 | 6 | 10 | .375 | 1 | 0 | 1 | .000 | Lost Division Semifinal (ROC) |
| Toronto Rock | 2008 | 16 | 7 | 9 | .438 | – | – | – | – | Did not qualify |
| Toronto Rock | 2009 | 3 | 1 | 2 | .333 | – | – | – | – | Fired |
| New England Black Wolves | 2016 | 18 | 10 | 8 | .556 | 3 | 1 | 2 | .333 | Lost Eastern Finals (BUF) |
| New England Black Wolves | 2017 | 18 | 8 | 10 | .444 | 1 | 0 | 1 | .000 | Lost Eastern Division Semi-final (TOR) |
| New England Black Wolves | 2018 | 18 | 9 | 9 | .500 | 1 | 0 | 1 | .000 | Lost Eastern Division Semi-final (ROC) |
| New England Black Wolves | 2019 | 18 | 9 | 9 | .500 | 1 | 0 | 1 | .000 | Lost Eastern Division Semi-final (BUF) |
| New England Black Wolves | 2020 | 11 | 8 | 3 | .727 | – | – | – | – | Season suspended due to COVID-19 pandemic |
| Albany FireWolves | 2022 | 18 | 9 | 9 | .500 | 1 | 0 | 1 | .000 | Lost Eastern Conference quarterfinal (BUF) |
| Albany FireWolves | 2023 | 18 | 3 | 15 | .167 | – | – | – | – | Did not qualify |
| Albany FireWolves | 2024 | 18 | 11 | 7 | .611 | 5 | 3 | 2 | .600 | Lost NLL Finals (BUF) |
| Albany FireWolves | 2025 | 18 | 7 | 11 | .389 | – | – | – | – | Did not qualify |
| Oshawa FireWolves | 2026 | 18 | 6 | 12 | .333 | – | – | – | – | Did not qualify |
| Totals: | 13 | 208 | 94 | 114 | .452 | 13 | 4 | 9 | .308 | |
