= Dan Stroup =

Canadian lacrosse player and coach

Personal information
- Nickname: Swoop
- Nationality: Canadian
- Born: December 18, 1968 Vancouver, British Columbia, Canada
- Height: 6 ft 0 in (183 cm)
- Weight: 195 lb (88 kg; 13 st 13 lb)

Sport
- Position: Forward
- Shoots: Right
- NLL teams: Portland LumberJax; Edmonton Rush; Colorado Mammoth; Vancouver Ravens; Toronto Rock; Ontario Raiders; Baltimore Thunder
- Pro career: 1995–2009

Dan Stroup (born December 18, 1968, in Vancouver, British Columbia) is a coach for the Washington Stealth of the National Lacrosse League. Prior to his retirement, Stroup played for several teams over a 13-season career which included winning the Champion's Cup four times: three (1999, 2000, and 2002) with the Toronto Rock, and one (2006) with the Colorado Mammoth.

== Statistics ==
=== NLL ===
Dan Stroup		Regular season									Playoffs								
Season	Team	GP	G	A	Pts	LB	PIM	Pts/GP	LB/GP	PIM/GP	GP	G	A	Pts	LB	PIM	Pts/GP	LB/GP	PIM/GP
1995	Baltimore Thunder	8	6	4	10	22	6	1.25	2.75	0.75	–	–	–	–	–	–	–	–	–
1998	Ontario Raiders	11	7	15	22	49	0	2.00	4.45	0.00	–	–	–	–	–	–	–	–	–
1999	Toronto Rock	12	27	20	47	74	7	3.92	6.17	0.58	2	4	1	5	13	0	2.50	6.50	0.00
2000	Toronto Rock	12	29	17	46	63	6	3.83	5.25	0.50	2	7	0	7	7	0	3.50	3.50	0.00
2001	Toronto Rock	14	19	19	38	87	0	2.71	6.21	0.00	2	4	1	5	15	2	2.50	7.50	1.00
2002	Toronto Rock	16	37	23	60	86	12	3.75	5.38	0.75	2	7	4	11	8	0	5.50	4.00	0.00
2003	Vancouver Ravens	16	34	36	70	62	7	4.38	3.88	0.44	1	3	2	5	3	0	5.00	3.00	0.00
2004	Vancouver Ravens	16	23	28	51	55	10	3.19	3.44	0.63	–	–	–	–	–	–	–	–	–
2005	Colorado Mammoth	16	31	10	41	67	0	2.56	4.19	0.00	1	0	1	1	4	0	1.00	4.00	0.00
2006	Colorado Mammoth	15	22	12	34	52	2	2.27	3.47	0.13	3	4	4	8	11	0	2.67	3.67	0.00
2007	Edmonton Rush	16	29	22	51	51	6	3.19	3.19	0.38	–	–	–	–	–	–	–	–	–
2008	Edmonton Rush	16	21	21	42	63	8	2.63	3.94	0.50	–	–	–	–	–	–	–	–	–
2009	Portland LumberJax	14	9	8	17	35	14	1.21	2.50	1.00	1	1	0	1	1	0	1.00	1.00	0.00
		182	294	235	529	766	78	2.91	4.21	0.43	14	30	13	43	62	2	3.07	4.43	0.14
Career Total:		196	324	248	572	828	80	2.92	4.22	0.41									

GP–Games played; G–Goals; A–Assists; Pts–Points; LB–Loose balls; PIM–Penalty minutes; Pts/GP–Points per games played; LB/GP–Loose balls per games played; PIM/GP–Penalty minutes per games played.

Preceded by Colin Doyle	Champion's Cup MVP; 2000	Succeeded by Dallas Eliuk
