= Blaine Manning =

Canadian lacrosse player

Personal information
- Born: September 10, 1979 (age 46) Calgary, Alberta, Canada
- Height: 6 ft 1 in (185 cm)
- Weight: 210 lb (95 kg; 15 st 0 lb)

Sport
- Position: Forward
- Shoots: Right
- NLL draft: 2nd overall, 2001; Calgary Roughnecks
- NLL team: Toronto Rock
- Pro career: 2002–2013

Blaine Manning (born September 10, 1979) is a Canadian former box lacrosse player for the Toronto Rock in the National Lacrosse League (NLL). During his tenure with the team, he won four NLL Championships (2002, 2003, 2005, 2011), most notably in 2011.

== Early life ==
Manning was born in Calgary, Alberta, Canada, while his mother was on a weekend business trip. Growing up as the youngest of four boys in Sherwood Park, he competed on Team Albera's Under-19 field lacrosse team with two of his brothers; Blake and Blair. In 1999, he played Jr. An indoor lacrosse for the Victoria Shamrocks, where he was voted to 2nd All-Star team in B.C.L.A Jr. A Series and received the team's Sportsman of the Year. Manning eventually moved to a private school in Maryland in order to play lacrosse and graduated from Radford University.

== Career in the National Lacrosse League ==
Coming out of Junior A lacrosse, Manning was drafted second overall by the Calgary Roughnecks in the 2001 National Lacrosse League (NLL) draft. However, neither Manning nor the first overall pick Gavin Prout wished to play for their respective teams. At the time, Manning stated he would have preferred a selection by the Washington Power because of his girlfriend's location. He was eventually traded to the Toronto Rock in exchange for Kaleb Toth and a first round draft pick on October 2, 2001, before he ever suited up for the Roughnecks. In his rookie season with the Rock, he won the NLL Rookie of the Year Award after recording 71 points in 16 games.

In his sophomore season, Manning scored five goals and had eight assists for 13 points in a game against Buffalo, tying a Toronto Rock single-game record. This earned him the NLL Offensive Player of the Week honours. In 2005, Manning recorded 105 points in 16 games to finish second overall in scoring league wide. He helped lead the team to their third NLL championship in four years, while also earning his third Second All-Pro Teams honours. He signed a one-year contract extension with the team on October 21, 2006.

In the following five years, Toronto failed to qualify for the NLL post-season. During the 2006 and 2007 NLL seasons, they failed to qualify for the season rounds, and from 2008 to 2009, they were eliminated during the regular season. Upon acquiring new owners, the Rock played their first playoff game at the Air Canada Centre in five years on April 17, 2010. Although they failed to make the finals, the Rock bounced back and won the 2011 National Lacrosse League Championship, breaking their drought. After winning his fourth championship with the team, he announced his retirement on July 31, 2013.

=== Coaching career ===
On August 6, 2013, Manning was announced as an assistant coach for the Toronto Rock alongside Dan Ladouceur. He was renamed an assistant coach for the Toronto Rock on July 26, 2016, under head coach Matt Sawyer. His contract was once again extended in 2019.

== Statistics ==
=== NLL ===
| Blaine Manning | | Regular season | | | | | | | | | Playoffs | | | | | | | | |
| Season | Team | GP | G | A | Pts | LB | PIM | Pts/GP | LB/GP | PIM/GP | GP | G | A | Pts | LB | PIM | Pts/GP | LB/GP | PIM/GP |
|---|---|---|---|---|---|---|---|---|---|---|---|---|---|---|---|---|---|---|---|
| 2002 | Toronto Rock | 16 | 21 | 50 | 71 | 109 | 13 | 4.44 | 6.81 | 0.81 | 2 | 4 | 8 | 12 | 20 | 0 | 6.00 | 10.00 | 0.00 |
| 2003 | Toronto Rock | 16 | 40 | 38 | 78 | 78 | 13 | 4.88 | 4.88 | 0.81 | 2 | 4 | 2 | 6 | 4 | 0 | 3.00 | 2.00 | 0.00 |
| 2004 | Toronto Rock | 16 | 36 | 54 | 90 | 81 | 17 | 5.63 | 5.06 | 1.06 | 1 | 2 | 5 | 7 | 5 | 0 | 7.00 | 5.00 | 0.00 |
| 2005 | Toronto Rock | 16 | 39 | 66 | 105 | 83 | 18 | 6.56 | 5.19 | 1.13 | 2 | 4 | 6 | 10 | 10 | 0 | 5.00 | 5.00 | 0.00 |
| 2006 | Toronto Rock | 16 | 28 | 52 | 80 | 79 | 19 | 5.00 | 4.94 | 1.19 | 1 | 0 | 1 | 1 | 6 | 0 | 1.00 | 6.00 | 0.00 |
| 2007 | Toronto Rock | 16 | 21 | 56 | 77 | 56 | 2 | 4.81 | 3.50 | 0.13 | 1 | 1 | 0 | 1 | 6 | 0 | 1.00 | 6.00 | 0.00 |
| 2008 | Toronto Rock | 16 | 30 | 44 | 74 | 90 | 4 | 4.63 | 5.63 | 0.25 | – | – | – | – | – | – | – | – | – |
| 2009 | Toronto Rock | 16 | 20 | 42 | 62 | 68 | 22 | 3.88 | 4.25 | 1.38 | – | – | – | – | – | – | – | – | – |
| 2010 | Toronto Rock | 16 | 35 | 47 | 82 | 82 | 21 | 5.13 | 5.13 | 1.31 | 3 | 5 | 7 | 12 | 18 | 0 | 4.00 | 6.00 | 0.00 |
| 2011 | Toronto Rock | 16 | 23 | 52 | 75 | 62 | 14 | 4.69 | 3.88 | 0.88 | 3 | 2 | 6 | 8 | 14 | 0 | 2.67 | 4.67 | 0.00 |
| 2012 | Toronto Rock | 6 | 3 | 6 | 9 | 19 | 7 | 1.50 | 3.17 | 1.17 | 2 | 0 | 5 | 5 | 11 | 0 | 2.50 | 5.50 | 0.00 |
| 2013 | Toronto Rock | 15 | 11 | 19 | 30 | 40 | 6 | 2.00 | 2.67 | 0.40 | 1 | 1 | 1 | 2 | 3 | 0 | 2.00 | 3.00 | 0.00 |
| | | 181 | 307 | 526 | 833 | 847 | 156 | 4.60 | 4.68 | 0.86 | 18 | 23 | 41 | 64 | 97 | 0 | 3.56 | 5.39 | 0.00 |
| Career Total: | | 199 | 330 | 567 | 897 | 944 | 156 | 4.51 | 4.74 | 0.78 | | | | | | | | | |

GP–Games played; G–Goals; A–Assists; Pts–Points; LB–Loose balls; PIM–Penalty minutes; Pts/GP–Points per games played; LB/GP–Loose balls per games played; PIM/GP–Penalty minutes per games played.

== Personal life ==
Manning married his fiance Christine in 2010 and they have one son together.

| Preceded by Tracy Kelusky | NLL Rookie of the Year; 2002 | Succeeded by Brian Langtry |
