= Ontario Raiders =

Former NLL professional box lacrosse team

- Division: East
- Based in: Hamilton, Ontario
- Arena: Copps Coliseum
- Colours: Black, Gold, Red
- Chairman: Chris Fritz
- Head coach: Les Bartley
- General manager: John Mouradian
- Later: Toronto Rock

The Ontario Raiders were a member of the National Lacrosse League during the 1998 NLL season. The franchise was founded as an expansion team in Hamilton, Ontario, and played their home games at Copps Coliseum. Former Buffalo Bandits coach Les Bartley was hired to coach the new team, and he lured former Bandit Jim Veltman to join him, becoming the Raiders' captain. The team finished a respectable 6-6 in their inaugural season, but missed the playoffs on a tie-breaker. Following the season, losses of $250,000 forced owner Chris Fritz to look for partners. Maple Leaf Sports & Entertainment considered purchasing the team, but ultimately a group which included Bill Watters, the then assistant general manager of the Toronto Maple Leafs, Paul Beeston, former president of the Toronto Blue Jays, Tie Domi, player for the Maple Leafs, and Bobby Orr, former NHL player, bought it for $250,000 and promptly relocated the team to Toronto's Maple Leaf Gardens where they rebranded it the Toronto Rock.

== Awards and honours ==
Year	Player	Award
1998	Colin Doyle	Rookie of the Year

== Notable players ==
- Bob Watson
- Colin Doyle
- Jim Veltman
- Mike Accursi

=== Team roster ===
No.		Position	Player
11	(Canada)	Def	Clark, Glenn
2	(Canada)	Def	Coyle, Pat
7	(Canada)	Fwd	Doyle, Colin
25	(Canada)	Fwd	Gill, Chris

No.		Position	Player
8	(Canada)	Fwd	Stroup, Dan
32	(Canada)	Fwd	Veltman, Jim
29	(Canada)	Goalie	Watson, Bob

== Records ==
Season	Division	W–L	Finish	Home	Road	GF	GA	Coach	Playoffs
1998		6–6	5th	4–2	2–4	165	157	Les Bartley	Missed playoffs
Total	1 season	6–6		4–2	2–4	165	157		
