= Vancouver Ravens =

Former NLL professional box lacrosse team

- Sport: Box lacrosse
- Founded: 2002
- Last season: 2004
- League: National Lacrosse League
- Division: Northern/Western
- Location: Vancouver, British Columbia
- Arena: General Motors Place
- Colours: Red, Black, Yellow
- Head coach: Paul Dal Monte
- Championships: 0
- Playoff appearances: 2 (2002, 2003)

The Vancouver Ravens were the original Vancouver National Lacrosse League (NLL) franchise from 2002 to 2004. The team played their home games at General Motors Place, now Rogers Arena, in Vancouver, British Columbia, Canada. At the conclusion of their three-year lease at GM Place, they were unable to secure an extension with GM Place nor able to negotiate with Pacific Coliseum. Combined with a lack of attendance due to unstable ownership, on December 14, 2004, the NLL announced that the Ravens would cease operations and not be playing in the 2005 NLL season.

On June 18, 2007, a bid was submitted to the NLL for the return of the Vancouver Ravens for the 2008 season. The bid that was submitted to the NLL was approved on the condition that an arena lease is obtained and 2,500 season tickets are sold.

On July 16, 2007, there was confirmation that the Vancouver Ravens could play in the 2008 season at GM Place. On July 19, 2007, contrary to earlier reports, the NLL announced that the Vancouver Ravens would not play in the 2008 season.

On August 26, 2008, retired Olympic Boxer and bronze medallist Dale Walters, along with Jeff Hughes, applied to return professional lacrosse back to Vancouver through the purchase and relocation of the Portland Lumberjax.

Since the folding of the Ravens franchise, the National Lacrosse League has returned to British Columbia in the form of the Vancouver Warriors, who play out of Rogers Arena in Vancouver. The franchise was formerly named the Washington Stealth and played in Everett, Washington, before relocating to Langley, BC in 2013, and then to Vancouver in 2018.

== Awards and honours ==
Year	Player	Award
2002	Tom Mayenknecht	Executive of the Year
2002	Dave Evans	GM of the Year

== All time record ==
Season	Division	W-L	Finish	Home	Road	GF	GA	Coach	Playoffs
2002	Northern	10–6	2nd	6–2	4–4	236	192	Paul Dal Monte	Lost in quarterfinals
2003	Northern	9–7	3rd	5–3	4–4	208	196	Paul Dal Monte	Lost in quarterfinals
2004	Western	5–11	5th	3–5	2–6	188	213	Paul Dal Monte	Missed playoffs
Total	3 seasons	24–24		14–10	10–14	632	601		

== Playoff results ==
Season	Game	Visiting	Home
2002	Quarterfinals	Vancouver 10	Rochester 11
2003	Quarterfinals	Vancouver 12	Colorado 15
