= Bob Watson (lacrosse) =

Canadian lacrosse player

Personal information
- Nickname: Whipper
- Born: April 6, 1970 (age 56) Guelph, Ontario, Canada
- Height: 6 ft 0 in (183 cm)
- Weight: 195 lb (88 kg; 13 st 13 lb)

Sport
- Position: Goaltender
- Shoots: Left
- NLL teams: Toronto Rock; Ontario Raiders; Baltimore Thunder
- Pro career: 1996–2011

Bob "Whipper" Watson (born April 6, 1970) is a Canadian former professional box lacrosse goaltender for the Toronto Rock in the National Lacrosse League and is regarded as one of the best goaltenders ever to play indoor lacrosse. Watson won six NLL Championships with the Rock, and was named Championship Game MVP in both 2003 and 2011. Watson was named NLL Goaltender of the Year in 2001 and again in 2008. After 13 years in Toronto and winning 6 Championships, Watson decided to retire to devote his time to family and a new job with the Waterloo Regional Police Service.

Watson considered retirement after the 2010 season when the Rock lost to the Washington Stealth in the Championship game, but he later decided to come back for one more season. Mid-way through the 2011 season, Watson announced that it would be his last in the NLL. The Rock made it back to the Championship and in his final NLL game, Watson was named Championship Game MVP for the second time in his career as the Rock beat the Stealth 8–7 in a rematch of the 2010 game.

Bob Watson was the only 2011 inductee into the NLL Hall of Fame. He received 86% of the Hall entry votes, the only player that year to surpass the mandatory 75%. He was the third goaltender to be entered into the NLL Hall of Fame.

== Statistics ==
=== NLL ===
Bob Watson		Regular Season								Playoffs							
Season	Team	GP	Min	W	L	GA	GAA	Sv	Sv %	GP	Min	W	L	GA	GAA	Sv	Sv %
1996	Baltimore Thunder	9	268:00	0	0	77	17.24	155	0.668	–	–	–	–	–	–	–	–
1998	Ontario Raiders	12	574:00	5	5	115	12.02	370	0.763	–	–	–	–	–	–	–	–
1999	Toronto Rock	11	548:00	6	2	110	12.04	344	0.758	2	119:00	2	0	12	6.05	69	0.852
2000	Toronto Rock	12	678:22	9	3	125	11.06	422	0.771	2	120:00	2	0	23	11.50	81	0.779
2001	Toronto Rock	14	715:16	10	2	106	8.89	415	0.797	2	115:30	1	1	18	9.35	72	0.800
2002	Toronto Rock	16	681:12	9	3	131	11.54	425	0.764	2	125:24	2	0	23	11.00	67	0.744
2003	Toronto Rock	16	602:11	6	4	101	10.06	351	0.777	2	120:00	2	0	17	8.50	80	0.825
2004	Toronto Rock	16	571:04	5	5	106	11.14	327	0.755	1	20:30	0	0	7	20.49	11	0.611
2005	Toronto Rock	16	886:16	11	4	174	11.78	543	0.757	2	120:00	2	0	23	11.50	69	0.750
2006	Toronto Rock	16	909:36	8	8	170	11.21	575	0.772	1	57:00	0	1	16	16.84	38	0.704
2007	Toronto Rock	15	855:37	6	8	157	11.01	586	0.789	1	59:10	0	1	8	8.11	52	0.867
2008	Toronto Rock	15	812:38	7	6	140	10.34	513	0.786	–	–	–	–	–	–	–	–
2009	Toronto Rock	16	820:46	6	8	180	13.16	525	0.745	–	–	–	–	–	–	–	–
2010	Toronto Rock	13	670:12	7	4	104	9.31	390	0.789	3	176:51	2	1	32	10.86	96	0.750
2011	Toronto Rock	16	850:22	10	4	143	10.09	530	0.788	3	180:00	3	0	26	8.67	114	0.814
		213	10,443:32	105	66	1,939	11.14	6,471	0.769	21	1,213:25	16	4	205	10.14	749	0.785
Career Total:		234	11,656:57	121	70	2,144	11.04	7,220	0.771								

GP–Games played;Min–Minutes played;W–Wins;L–Losses;GA–Goals against;GAA–Goals against average;Sv–Number of saves;Sv %–Save percentage;

Preceded by none	NLL Goaltender of the Year; 2001	Succeeded by Rob Blasdell
Preceded by Colin Doyle	Champion's Cup MVP; 2003	Succeeded by Curtis Palidwor
Preceded by Anthony Cosmo	NLL Goaltender of the Year; 2008	Succeeded by Ken Montour
Preceded by Lewis Ratcliff	Champion's Cup MVP; 2011	Succeeded by Cody Jamieson
