= 2017 NLL season =

- League: National Lacrosse League
- Sport: Indoor lacrosse
- Duration: December 29, 2016 – June 10, 2017
- Games: 18
- Teams: 9

Draft
- Top draft pick: Ryan Keenan
- Picked by: Saskatchewan Rush

Regular Season
- Top seed: Georgia Swarm
- Season MVP: Lyle Thompson (Georgia Swarm)
- Top scorer: Lyle Thompson (Georgia Swarm)

Playoffs
- Finals champions: Georgia Swarm (1st title)
- Runners-up: Saskatchewan Rush
- Finals MVP: Lyle Thompson (Swarm)

NLL seasons
- ← 2016 season 2018 season →

The 2017 National Lacrosse League season, the 31st in the history of the NLL began on December 29, 2016, and ended with the Champion's Cup Finals series on June 10, 2017, as the Georgia Swarm defeated the Saskatchewan Rush to win their franchise's first Champions Cup.

== Teams ==
2017 National Lacrosse League
Division	Team	City	Arena	Capacity
East	Buffalo Bandits	Buffalo, New York	KeyBank Center	19,070
East	Georgia Swarm	Duluth, Georgia	Infinite Energy Arena	10,500
East	New England Black Wolves	Uncasville, Connecticut	Mohegan Sun Arena	7,074
East	Rochester Knighthawks	Rochester, New York	Blue Cross Arena	10,662
East	Toronto Rock	Toronto, Ontario	Air Canada Centre	18,800
West	Calgary Roughnecks	Calgary, Alberta	Scotiabank Saddledome	19,289
West	Colorado Mammoth	Denver, Colorado	Pepsi Center	18,007
West	Saskatchewan Rush	Saskatoon, Saskatchewan	SaskTel Centre	15,195
West	Vancouver Stealth	Langley, British Columbia	Langley Events Centre	5,276

=== Map of teams ===
East Division West Division

== Regular Season Standings ==
East Division
P	Team	GP	W	L	PCT	GB	Home	Road	GF	GA	Diff	GF/GP	GA/GP
1	Georgia Swarm – xyz	18	13	5	.722	0.0	7–2	6–3	266	213	+53	14.78	11.83
2	Toronto Rock – x	18	9	9	.500	4.0	4–5	5–4	219	200	+19	12.17	11.11
3	New England Black Wolves – x	18	8	10	.444	5.0	5–4	3–6	220	244	−24	12.22	13.56
4	Rochester Knighthawks	18	7	11	.389	6.0	4–5	3–6	175	209	−34	9.72	11.61
5	Buffalo Bandits	18	6	12	.333	7.0	3–6	3–6	226	251	−25	12.56	13.94

West Division
P	Team	GP	W	L	PCT	GB	Home	Road	GF	GA	Diff	GF/GP	GA/GP
1	Saskatchewan Rush – xy	18	12	6	.667	0.0	8–1	4–5	231	212	+19	12.83	11.78
2	Vancouver Stealth – x	18	9	9	.500	3.0	4–5	5–4	218	221	−3	12.11	12.28
3	Colorado Mammoth – x	18	9	9	.500	3.0	5–4	4–5	202	199	+3	11.22	11.06
4	Calgary Roughnecks	18	8	10	.444	4.0	5–4	3–6	212	220	−8	11.78	12.22

x: Clinched playoff berth; c: Clinched playoff berth by crossing over to another division; y: Clinched division; z: Clinched best regular season record; GP: Games Played
W: Wins; L: Losses; GB: Games back; PCT: Win percentage; Home: Record at Home; Road: Record on the Road; GF: Goals scored; GA: Goals allowed
Differential: Difference between goals scored and allowed; GF/GP: Average number of goals scored per game; GA/GP: Average number of goals allowed per game

== Scoring leaders ==
Note: GP = Games played; G = Goals; A = Assists; Pts = Points; PIM = Penalty minutes; LB = Loose Balls

Player	Team	GP	G	A	Pts	PIM	LB
Lyle Thompson	Georgia Swarm	18	45	71	116	8	126
Mark Matthews	Saskatchewan Rush	18	40	73	113	25	61
Corey Small	Vancouver Stealth	18	46	65	111	2	34
Curtis Dickson	Calgary Roughnecks	18	54	53	107	18	79
Shawn Evans	New England Black Wolves	17	38	65	103	50	90
Callum Crawford	Colorado Mammoth	18	36	62	98	8	74
Rhys Duch	Vancouver Stealth	17	38	56	94	7	70
Tom Schreiber	Toronto Rock	18	33	61	94	0	83
Dane Dobbie	Calgary Roughnecks	18	39	50	89	6	51
Kevin Crowley	New England Black Wolves	18	45	40	85	11	80

== Leading goaltenders ==
Note: GP = Games played; Mins = Minutes played; W = Wins; L = Losses: GA = Goals Allowed; SV% = Save Percentage; GAA = Goals against average

Player	Team	GP	Mins	W	L	GA	SV%	GAA
Nick Rose	Toronto Rock	18	1019	8	8	184	0.774	10.82
Dillon Ward	Colorado Mammoth	18	909	9	6	165	0.792	10.89
Aaron Bold	Saskatchewan Rush	17	935	11	4	175	0.763	11.22
Tye Belanger	Vancouver Warriors	18	818	7	7	154	0.794	11.28
Matt Vinc	Rochester Knighthawks	18	902	6	9	171	0.796	11.37

== Playoffs ==
Division semifinals
East Division
E2	Toronto	18
E3	New England	10
West Division
W2	Vancouver	12
W3	Colorado	13

Division finals (3-game series)
E1	Georgia	2
E2	Toronto	0
W1	Saskatchewan	2
W3	Colorado	0

Finals (3-game series)
E1	Georgia	2
W1	Saskatchewan	0

*Overtime

=== Division Semifinals ===
==== (E2) Toronto Rock vs. (E3) New England Black Wolves ====
May 6, 2017	Toronto Rock	18–10 (5–6, 4–0, 3–1, 6–3)	New England Black Wolves	Air Canada Centre; Attendance: 6,260

Game reference

Nick Rose
Brandon Miller
Goalies
Evan Kirk
Doug Jamieson

Beirnes (Hickey, Reinholdt) – 02:27	1–0
Edwards (Rose) – 05:39	2–0
	2–1	07:29 – O'Connor (Suddons, Thorimbert)
	2–2	07:56 – Crowley (Buchanan)
Schreiber (McArdle) – 08:20	3–2
	3–3	08:49 – Buchanan (O'Connor, Culp)
	3–4	09:27 – Bucktooth (Muir)
Schreiber (McArdle, Leblanc) – 11:27	4–4
	4–5	12:41 – Crowley (Buchanan, Bucktooth)
Edwards (B. Merrill) – 14:10	5–5
	5–6	14:28 – Culp (Buchanan, Coyle)
Hickey (Schreiber, Leblanc) (PP) – 19:14	6–6
B. Merrill – 19:22	7–6
Gamble – 24:13	8–6
Hickey (Kri) (PP) – 27:37	9–6
Schreiber (Beirnes, Magnuson) – 32:23	10–6
	10–7	36:11 – Evans (Culp, O'Connor)
Linter (Schreiber, McArdle) – 36:43	11–7
Reinholdt (Leblanc, Hickey) – 37:16	12–7
Leblanc (Hickey, Reinholdt) – 47:15	13–7
Schreiber (Reinholdt, Hickey) – 51:24	14–7
	14–8	52:22 – Evans (Crowley, Bucktooth)
Leblanc (Hickey, Linter) – 52:58	15–8
	15–9	53:04 – Thorimbert
B. Merrill (Kri) (ENG) – 53:29	16–9
Gilbert (Gamble) – 54:25	17–9
Beirnes (Schreiber, Hickey) (PP) – 56:54	18–9
	18–10	59:53 – Burns (Manney, Jamieson)

11 min
Penalties
13 min
60
Shots
46

==== (E2) Vancouver Stealth vs. (E3) Colorado Mammoth ====
May 6, 2017	Vancouver Stealth	12–13 (1–3, 5–4, 2–3, 4–3)	Colorado Mammoth	Langley Events Centre; Attendance: 4,011

Game reference

Tye Belanger
Goalies
Dillon Ward

	0–1	03:06 – Greer (Noble, Crawford)
	0–2	06:22 – Wardle (Adams, Keogh)
	0–3	08:50 – McLaughlin (Greer)
Small (Schuss) – 10:03	1–3
Small (Schuss, Durtson) – 16:34	2–3
	2–4	20:40 – Cupido
	2–5	22:12 – Crawford (Noble, Keogh)
	2–6	24:51 – Gilles (Ward)
Schuss (Duch) (PP) – 26:04	3–6
Durtson (Conway, Schuss) (PP) – 27:01	4–6
Schuss (Harnett, Beers) – 27:44	5–6
Schuss (Duch, Smith) – 28:56	6–6
	6–7	29:59 – Cupido (Ward)
Salt (Durtson) – 31:51	7–7
	7–8	33:15 – Crawford (Self, Greer)
McCready (Messenger, Schuss) – 34:17	8–8
	8–9	38:40 – McLaughlin (Keogh)
	8–10	41:38 – Self (Ward)
Small (Schuss, Conway) – 46:15	9–10
	9–11	47:27 – Gillies (Gajic)
	9–12	52:52 – Greer (Keogh, Self)
	9–13	53:09 – Crawford (Wardle, Greer)
Small (Salt, Belanger) – 55:24	10–13
Small (Beers) – 57:25	11–13
Small (Schuss, McCready) – 58:49	12–13

0 min
Penalties
4 min
52
Shots
45

=== Division Finals (best of three) ===
==== (E1) Georgia Swarm vs. (E2) Toronto Rock ====
May 13, 2017	Toronto Rock	8–11 (1–0, 3–2, 1–4, 3–5)	Georgia Swarm	Air Canada Centre; Attendance: 7,329

Game reference

Brandon Miller
Goalies
Mike Poulin

Litner (Leblanc, Reinholdt) – 03:45	1–0
Edwards (Gamble, Kri) – 15:14	2–0
Leblanc (McArdle, Chapman) – 18:47	3–0
	3–1	21:02 – Jackson (L. Thompson, White)
Hickey (Reinholdt, Leblanc) – 21:34	4–1
	4–2	24:04 – Hall (Sellars, Tutton)
	4–3	34:37 – White
	4–4	37:28 – Tutton (Hall, White)
	4–5	39:28 – Hall (Jackson, Staats)
	4–6	40:28 – Jackson (Matisz, L. Thompson)
Beirnes (Reinholdt) (PP) – 44:09	5–6
	5–7	47:16 – Staats (White)
Lintner (Gamble, Harris) – 48:36	6–7
	6–8	52:09 – M. Thompson (Staats, O'Connor)
	6–9	55:54 – Hall (Jackson, L. Thompson)
	6–10	56:33 – White (ENG)
Schreiber (Leblanc, Rogers) – 56:43	7–10
Beirnes (Leblanc, Schreiber) – 58:29	8–10
	8–11	59:08 – MacIntosh (ENG)

12 min
Penalties
4 min
47
Shots
56

May 20, 2017	Georgia Swarm	13–9 (5–4, 4–2, 1–1, 3–2)	Toronto Rock	Infinite Energy Arena; Attendance: 7,992

Game reference

Mike Poulin
Goalies
Brandon Miller
Nick Rose

Staats (Ranagan, O'Connor) – 00:14	1–0
M. Thompson (Matisz, L. Thompson) – 01:15	2–0
Matisz (Jackson, Powless) – 02:56	3–0
	3–1	05:07 – Reinholdt (Hickey, Schreiber)
	3–2	06:03 – B. Merrill (Edwards)
L. Thompson (Hall) (SH) – 09:18	4–2
Cole (Staats) – 10:10	5–2
	5–3	12:34 – Leblanc (McArdle)
	5–4	12:56 – Reinholdt (Schreiber, B. Merrill)
Staats (Jackson) – 20:25	6–4
Hall (Staats, M. Thompson) – 21:08	7–4
	7–5	24:51 – Beirnes (Leblanc, Hickey)
Jackson (Staats, Hall) – 26:12	8–5
	8–6	26:56 – McArdle (Leblanc, B. Merrill)
Jackson (Staats, L. Thompson) – 28:30	9–6
	9–7	30:23 – Reinholdt (Leblanc, Lintner)
L. Thompson – 42:56	10–7
	10–8	49:39 – Reinholdt (Schreiber, Beirnes)
Jackson (L. Thompson) (PP) – 50:26	11–8
Powless (Staats, L. Thompson) – 55:11	12–8
	12–9	58:41 – Rogers
Hall (MacIntosh) (ENG) – 58:49	13–9

2 min
Penalties
5 min
49
Shots
51

Swarm wins series 2–0.

==== (W1) Saskatchewan Rush vs. (W3) Colorado Mammoth ====
May 13, 2017	Colorado Mammoth	9–18 (2–2, 3–3, 3–4, 1–9)	Saskatchewan Rush	Pepsi Center; Attendance: 11,012

Game reference

Dillon Ward
Alex Buque
Goalies
Aaron Bold

McLaughlin (Keogh, Crawford) – 01:41	1–0
Noble (Hope, Ward) (SH) – 03:54	2–0
	2–1	07:07 – McIntosh (Jones, Church)
	2–2	12:59 – Keenan (McIntosh, Dilks)
	2–3	16:30 – McIntosh (Matthews, Church)
Noble (McLaughlin) (SH) – 18:15	3–3
Noble (Greer) (PP) – 24:10	4–3
	4–4	24:55 – Reinholdt
	4–5	26:31 – Church (Matthews) (PP)
Ruest (Keogh, Coates) – 28:54	5–5
Wardle (Crawford, Ruest) – 30:25	6–5
	6–6	34:40 – Jones (Keenan, Matthews)
	6–7	35:51 – Church (Keenan, McIntosh)
	6–8	36:18 – McIntosh (Jones, Knight)
	6–9	39:37 – Jones (Church, Matthews) (PP)
McLaughlin (Crawford, Noble) (PP) – 40:07	7–9
Noble (Crawford, Greer) – 44:37	8–9
	8–10	45:26 – Matthews (Church, Dinsdale)
	8–11	47:07 – Matthews (Reinholdt)
	8–12	50:14 – McIntosh (Church, Jones) (PP)
	8–13	51:04 – Jones (Matthews, Church) (PP)
	8–14	51:32 – Jones (Knight, Mydske)
	8–15	53:58 – Messenger (Bold)
	8–16	54:29 – Jones (McIntosh, Knight)
Greer (PS) – 55:27	9–16
	9–17	56:47 – Jones (Matthews, Cornwall)
	9–18	57:51 – Knight (Matthews)

19 min
Penalties
6 min
40
Shots
57

May 20, 2017	Saskatchewan Rush	11–10 (2–3, 2–1, 5–4, 2–2)	Colorado Mammoth	SaskTel Centre; Attendance: 14,052

Game reference

Aaron Bold
Goalies
Dillon Ward

	0–1	08:15 – Downing (Stuart)
Matthews (Church, Messenger) – 10:27	1–1
Cornwall (Keenan, Knight) – 11:58	2–1
	2–2	12:27 – McLaughlin (Greer, Wardle)
	2–3	14:32 – Greer (Crawford)
	2–4	22:47 – Noble (Crawford, Wardle)
McIntosh (Church, Jones) (PP) – 22:47	3–4
Church (Matthews) – 26:43	4–4
McIntosh (Matthews, Church) (PP) – 32:35	5–4
	5–5	32:57 – McLaughlin (Noble, Crawford)
Dinsdale (Matthews, Jones) – 33:29	6–5
Jones (Reinholdt) – 34:42	7–5
	7–6	37:02 – Greer (Keogh, Ruest)
	7–7	38:45 – McLaughlin (Crawford, Greer) (PP)
	7–8	41:31 – Cupido (Ward)
Matthews (Keenan, Dinsdale) – 42:00	8–8
Church (McIntosh, Knight) – 44:54	9–8
Keenan (Matthews) – 45:45	10–8
Messenger – 46:26	11–8
	11–9	53:28 – Ruest (Self)
	11–10	55:26 – Noble (McLaughlin, Wardle)

7 min
Penalties
6 min
48
Shots
42

Rush wins series 2–0.

=== NLL Finals (best of three) ===
==== (E1) Georgia Swarm vs. (W1) Saskatchewan Rush ====
June 4, 2017	Georgia Swarm	18–14 (3–4, 4–5, 4–2, 7–3)	Saskatchewan Rush	Infinite Energy Arena; Attendance: 7,642

Game reference

Mike Poulin
Goalies
Aaron Bold
Tyler Carlson

Staats (Matisz, Hall) – 02:16	1–0
Matisz (L. Thompson, Powless) – 02:43	2–0
	2–1	04:54 – Thompson (Bold)
	2–2	07:14 – Knight (Matthews, Dinsdale)
Hall (Jackson) – 08:22	3–2
	3–3	12:44 – Matthews (Church) (PP)
	3–4	14:50 – Matthews (Church) (PP)
	3–5	16:38 – Jones (Corbeil, McIntosh) (SH)
L. Thompson – 18:09	4–5
	4–6	19:23 – Keenan (Messenger)
	4–7	19:52 – Thompson (Sorichetti, Rubisch)
Hall (Jackson, Powless) – 21:16	5–7
Powless (Jackson, L. Thompson) – 23:44	6–7
Powless (M. Thompson, Staats) – 24:49	7–7
	7–8	27:15 – Church (Knight, Keenan)
	7–9	29:57 – Knight (Matthews, Church)
	7–10	31:00 – Church (Matthews)
	7–11	37:18 – Jones (Matthews, McIntosh) (PP)
Hall (Sellars, Noble) – 38:59	8–11
Matisz (Staats, Powless) – 40:27	9–11
Jackson (Hall, Sellars) – 43:31	10–11
Jackson (Hall, L. Thompson) – 44:46	11–11
Hall (L. Thompson, MacIntosh) – 45:17	12–11
Staats (White) – 47:59	13–11
M. Thompson (Staats, White) – 48:38	14–11
	14–12	50:14 – Jones (Church)
	14–13	51:06 – Matthews (Church) (PP)
M. Thompson (White) – 52:50	15–13
Matisz (Jackson) – 53:20	16–13
Hall (Matisz, M. Thompson) – 56:27	17–13
Cole (Sellars) (ENG) – 59:03	18–13
	18–14	59:10 – Thompson

34 min
Penalties
4 min
54
Shots
50

June 10, 2017	Saskatchewan Rush	14–15 OT (3–5, 3–2, 2–3, 6–4, 0–1)	Georgia Swarm	SaskTel Centre; Attendance: 14,264

Game reference

Aaron Bold
Tyler Carlson
Goalies
Mike Poulin

	0–1	00:58 – Staats (M. Thompson)
	0–2	01:13 – Powless (O'Connor)
	0–3	02:43 – Staats (Jackson, Matisz)
Jones (Matthews, Church) (PP) – 04:13	1–3
Church (Knight, Matthews) – 10:35	2–3
	2–4	11:26 – L. Thompson (Jackson, Staats)
McIntosh (Matthews, Dinsdale) – 12:12	3–4
	3–5	14:34 – L. Thompson (Jackson, Powless) (PP)
Keenan (Hossack) – 20:51	4–5
Jones (LaFontaine) – 23:23	5–5
	5–6	22:48 – Staats (Powless, Jackson)
	5–7	26:29 – Staats (Powless, Jackson) (PP)
McIntosh (Knight, Jones) – 26:41	6–7
Keenan (Cornwall) – 31:08	7–7
	7–8	32:18 – M. Thompson (L. Thompson, Poulin)
Church (Keenan, Knight) – 33:04	8–8
	8–9	42:18 – Powless (Matisz)
	8–10	43:24 – Hall (L. Thompson, Matisz)
Church (Matthews) – 45:30	9–10
Hossack (Bold) – 47:29	10–10
McIntosh (Keenan) – 48:12	11–10
Church (Corbeil, Thompson) – 48:36	12–10
	12–11	53:17 – Hall (Staats)
	12–12	54:27 – L. Thompson (Matisz, Jackson)
	12–13	57:16 – Jackson (Matisz, Staats)
Thompson (Bold) – 58:26	13–13
Jones (Matthews, Keenan) – 58:48	14–13
	14–14	59:48 – White (L. Thompson) (ENG)
	14–15	61:17 – M. Thompson (L. Thompson)

4 min
Penalties
4 min
62
Shots
53

Swarm wins series 2–0.

== Awards ==
=== Annual awards ===
Award	Winner	Other Finalists
Most Valuable Player	Lyle Thompson, Georgia	Corey Small, Vancouver; Mark Matthews, Saskatchewan
Goaltender of the Year	Dillon Ward, Colorado	Mike Poulin, Georgia; Nick Rose, Toronto
Defensive Player of the Year	Jason Noble, Georgia	Graeme Hossack, Rochester; Steve Priolo, Buffalo
Transition Player of the Year	Brodie Merrill, Toronto	Jay Thorimbert, New England; Jordan MacIntosh, Georgia
Rookie of the Year	Tom Schreiber, Toronto	Kyle Jackson, Rochester; Latrell Harris, Toronto
Sportsmanship Award	Jordan Hall, Georgia	Kyle Buchanan, New England; Dan MacRae, Calgary
GM of the Year	John Arlotta, Georgia	Jamie Dawick, Toronto; Derek Keenan, Saskatchewan
Les Bartley Award	Ed Comeau, Georgia	Derek Keenan, Saskatchewan; Jamie Batley, Vancouver
Executive of the Year Award	Amber Cox, New England	Andy Arlotta, Georgia; John Catalano, Rochester
Teammate of the Year Award	Mike Poulin, Georgia	Kyle Buchanan, New England; Joel McCready, Vancouver
Tom Borrelli Award	Jake Elliott	Budd Bailey; Neil Stevens

=== All-pro teams ===
==== First Team ====
- Lyle Thompson, Georgia Swarm
- Mark Matthews, Saskatchewan Rush
- Corey Small, Vancouver Stealth
- Jason Noble, Georgia Swarm
- Brodie Merrill, Toronto Rock
- Dillon Ward, Colorado Mammoth

==== Second Team ====
- Curtis Dickson, Calgary Roughnecks
- Kevin Crowley, New England Black Wolves
- Shayne Jackson, Georgia Swarm
- Graeme Hossack, Rochester Knighthawks
- Jay Thorimbert, New England Black Wolves
- Mike Poulin, Georgia Swarm

=== All-Rookie Team ===
- Tom Schreiber, Toronto Rock
- Kyle Jackson, Rochester Knighthawks
- Josh Currier, Rochester Knighthawks
- Latrell Harris, Toronto Rock
- Mike Messenger, Saskatchewan Rush
- Joel Coyle, New England Black Wolves

== Stadiums and locations ==
Buffalo Bandits	Georgia Swarm	New England Black Wolves	Rochester Knighthawks	Toronto Rock
KeyBank Center	Infinite Energy Arena	Mohegan Sun Arena	Blue Cross Arena	Air Canada Centre
Capacity: 19,070	Capacity: 11,355	Capacity: 7,700	Capacity: 11,200	Capacity: 18,819

Calgary Roughnecks	Colorado Mammoth	Saskatchewan Rush	Vancouver Stealth
Scotiabank Saddledome	Pepsi Center	SaskTel Centre	Langley Events Centre
Capacity: 19,289	Capacity: 18,007	Capacity: 15,190	Capacity: 5,276

== Attendance ==
=== Regular season ===
Home team	Home games	Average attendance	Total attendance
Buffalo Bandits	9	15,148	136,340
Saskatchewan Rush	9	14,921	134,289
Colorado Mammoth	9	14,458	130,128
Calgary Roughnecks	9	11,622	104,599
Toronto Rock	9	9,623	86,613
Rochester Knighthawks	9	6,755	60,798
New England Black Wolves	9	5,402	48,626
Georgia Swarm	9	3,950	35,558
Vancouver Stealth	9	3,206	28,860
League	81	9,454	765,811

=== Playoffs ===
Home team	Home games	Average attendance	Total attendance
Saskatchewan Rush	2	14,158	28,316
Colorado Mammoth	1	11,012	11,012
Georgia Swarm	2	7,012	14,024
Toronto Rock	2	6,794	13,589
Vancouver Stealth	1	4,011	4,011
League	8	8,869	70,952

== See also ==
- 2017 in sports
