= 2017 Saskatchewan Rush season =

2017 Saskatchewan Rush
- West Division Champions
- League: NLL
- Division: 1st West
- 2017 record: 12-6
- Home record: 8-1
- Road record: 4-5
- Goals for: 231
- Goals against: 212
- General Manager: Derek Keenan
- Coach: Derek Keenan
- Captain: Chris Corbeil
- Alternate captains: Brett Mydske; Kyle Rubisch
- Arena: SaskTel Centre
- Average attendance: 14,921

Team leaders
- Goals: Mark Matthews (40)
- Assists: Mark Matthews (73)
- Points: Mark Matthews (113)
- Penalties in minutes: Mike Messenger (40)
- Loose Balls: Jeremy Thompson (179)
- Wins: Aaron Bold (11)
- Goals against average: Aaron Bold (11.17)

The Saskatchewan Rush is a lacrosse team based in Saskatoon, Saskatchewan playing in the National Lacrosse League (NLL). The 2017 season was the 12th in franchise history and 2nd in Saskatchewan. They originally played in Edmonton.

== Current standings ==
East Division
P	Team	GP	W	L	PCT	GB	Home	Road	GF	GA	Diff	GF/GP	GA/GP
1	Georgia Swarm – xyz	18	13	5	.722	0.0	7–2	6–3	266	213	+53	14.78	11.83
2	Toronto Rock – x	18	9	9	.500	4.0	4–5	5–4	219	200	+19	12.17	11.11
3	New England Black Wolves – x	18	8	10	.444	5.0	5–4	3–6	220	244	−24	12.22	13.56
4	Rochester Knighthawks	18	7	11	.389	6.0	4–5	3–6	175	209	−34	9.72	11.61
5	Buffalo Bandits	18	6	12	.333	7.0	3–6	3–6	226	251	−25	12.56	13.94

West Division
P	Team	GP	W	L	PCT	GB	Home	Road	GF	GA	Diff	GF/GP	GA/GP
1	Saskatchewan Rush – xy	18	12	6	.667	0.0	8–1	4–5	231	212	+19	12.83	11.78
2	Vancouver Stealth – x	18	9	9	.500	3.0	4–5	5–4	218	221	−3	12.11	12.28
3	Colorado Mammoth – x	18	9	9	.500	3.0	5–4	4–5	202	199	+3	11.22	11.06
4	Calgary Roughnecks	18	8	10	.444	4.0	5–4	3–6	212	220	−8	11.78	12.22

x: Clinched playoff berth; c: Clinched playoff berth by crossing over to another division; y: Clinched division; z: Clinched best regular season record; GP: Games Played
W: Wins; L: Losses; GB: Games back; PCT: Win percentage; Home: Record at Home; Road: Record on the Road; GF: Goals scored; GA: Goals allowed
Differential: Difference between goals scored and allowed; GF/GP: Average number of goals scored per game; GA/GP: Average number of goals allowed per game

== Game log ==
=== Regular season ===
Game	Date	Opponent	Location	Score	OT	Attendance	Record
1	January 7, 2017	@ Georgia Swarm	Infinite Energy Arena	L 10–18		4,809	0–1
2	January 14, 2017	@ Toronto Rock	Air Canada Centre	L 11–13		10,275	0–2
3	January 21, 2017	Rochester Knighthawks	SaskTel Centre	W 16–8		15,007	1–2
4	January 27, 2017	Vancouver Stealth	SaskTel Centre	W 16–12		14,502	2–2
5	February 4, 2017	@ Calgary Roughnecks	Scotiabank Saddledome	W 15–11		13,558	3–2
6	February 11, 2017	@ Rochester Knighthawks	Blue Cross Arena	W 21–12		7,194	4–2
7	February 18, 2017	Colorado Mammoth	SaskTel Centre	W 8–7		15,037	5–2
8	February 25, 2017	Calgary Roughnecks	SaskTel Centre	W 12–11	OT	15,045	6–2
9	March 4, 2017	@ Vancouver Stealth	Langley Events Centre	L 9–13		2,876	6–3
10	March 11, 2017	Colorado Mammoth	SaskTel Centre	W 12–11	OT	15,037	7–3
11	March 24, 2017	Calgary Roughnecks	SaskTel Centre	W 13–10		15,039	8–3
12	March 25, 2017	@ Colorado Mammoth	Pepsi Center	L 11–14		15,144	8–4
13	April 1, 2017	@ Buffalo Bandits	KeyBank Center	W 17–14		16,419	9–4
14	April 8, 2017	Vancouver Stealth	SaskTel Centre	W 16–12		15,045	10–4
15	April 15, 2017	New England Black Wolves	SaskTel Centre	L 12–13	OT	14,532	10–5
16	April 22, 2017	Toronto Rock	SaskTel Centre	W 15–10		15,045	11–5
17	April 28, 2017	@ Colorado Mammoth	Pepsi Center	W 10–9		17,209	12–5
18	April 29, 2017	@ Calgary Roughnecks	Scotiabank Saddledome	L 7–14		18,845	12–6

=== Playoffs ===
Game	Date	Opponent	Location	Score	OT	Attendance	Record
Western Final (Game 1)	May 13, 2017	@ Colorado Mammoth	Pepsi Center	W 18–9		11,012	1–0
Western Final (Game 2)	May 20, 2017	Colorado Mammoth	SaskTel Centre	W 11–10		14,052	2–0
Finals (Game 1)	June 4, 2017	@ Georgia Swarm	Infinite Energy Arena	L 14–18		7,642	2–1
Finals (Game 2)	June 10, 2017	Georgia Swarm	SaskTel Centre	L 14–15	OT	14,264	2–2

== Player stats ==
=== Runners (Top 10) ===
Note: GP = Games played; G = Goals; A = Assists; Pts = Points; LB = Loose balls; PIM = Penalty minutes

Player	GP	G	A	Pts	LB	PIM
Mark Matthews	18	40	73	113	61	25
Robert Church	18	35	42	77	57	2
Adam Jones	16	26	31	57	75	8
Curtis Knight	18	18	37	55	56	6
Ben McIntosh	17	32	22	54	56	6
Ryan Keenan	16	13	29	42	45	2
Matthew Dinsdale	16	14	14	28	25	2
Jeff Cornwall	18	10	16	26	78	4
Chris Corbeil	18	6	13	19	100	4
Jeremy Thompson	18	5	12	17	179	18
Team Totals	18	233	339	572	1393	257

=== Goaltenders ===
Note: GP = Games played; MIN = Minutes; W = Wins; L = Losses; GA = Goals against; Sv% = Save percentage; GAA = Goals against average

Player	GP	MIN	W	L	GA	Sv%	GAA
Aaron Bold	16	934:44	11	4	174	.765	11.17
Tyler Carlson	3	150:00	1	2	37	.709	14.80
Totals			13	5	190	.758	10.56

Saskatchewan Rush roster
Active (21-man) roster		Inactive roster	Coaches
Goaltenders: 77 (Canada) Aaron Bold; 30 (Canada) Tyler Carlson; Defensemen: 94 (Canada) Matt Hossack; 15 (Canada) Matt MacGrotty; 8 (Canada) Mike Messenger; 2 (Canada) Brett Mydske (A); 4 (Canada) Kyle Rubisch (A)	Forwards: 17 (Canada) Robert Church; 32 (Canada) Matthew Dinsdale; 9 (Canada) Curtis Knight; 42 (Canada) Mark Matthews; 90 (Canada) Ben McIntosh; 41 (Canada) Dan Taylor; Transition: 16 (Canada) Chris Corbeil (C); 13 (Canada) Jeff Cornwall; 25 (Canada) Ryan Keenan; 33 (Canada) John LaFontaine; 7 (Canada) Tor Reinholdt; 72 (Canada) Adrian Sorichetti; 74 (Haudenosaunee) Jeremy Thompson	Practice squad: 35 (Canada) Peter Dubenski (G); Holdout: 24 (Canada) Ryan Dilks(D); 19 (Canada) Adam Jones (F); Unable to play: 79 (Canada) Nik Bilic (D)	Head coach {{{Head Coach}}} Legend: * Suspended list; (C) Captain; (A) Alternate captain; Roster updated 2017-04-28; NLL Transactions

=== Entry Draft ===
The 2016 NLL Entry Draft took place on September 26, 2016. The Rush made the following selections:

Round	Overall	Player	College/Club
1	1	Ryan Keenan	Quinnipiac
1	3	Michael Messenger	Limestone
2	14	Matt Hossack	RIT
3	30	Mason Pynn	Drexel
4	40	Michael Kaminski	
5	48	Spencer Bromley	McGill
6	57	Rylee McKinnon	

== See also ==
- 2017 NLL season
