= 2017 Toronto Rock season =

2017 Toronto Rock
- League: NLL
- Division: 2nd East
- 2017 record: 9-9
- Home record: 4-5
- Road record: 5-4
- Goals for: 219
- Goals against: 200
- General Manager: Jamie Dawick
- Coach: Matt Sawyer
- Captain: Brodie Merrill
- Alternate captains: Sandy Chapman; Stephan Leblanc
- Arena: Air Canada Centre
- Average attendance: 9,623

Team leaders
- Goals: Brett Hickey (45)
- Assists: Tom Schreiber (61)
- Points: Tom Schreiber (94)
- Penalties in minutes: Brodie Merrill (41)
- Loose Balls: Brodie Merrill (171)
- Wins: Nick Rose (8)
- Goals against average: Brandon Miller (10.31)

The Toronto Rock are a lacrosse team based in Toronto playing in the National Lacrosse League (NLL). The 2017 season is the 20th in franchise history, and 19th as the Rock.

== Regular season ==
=== Finalstandings ===
East Division
P	Team	GP	W	L	PCT	GB	Home	Road	GF	GA	Diff	GF/GP	GA/GP
1	Georgia Swarm – xyz	18	13	5	.722	0.0	7–2	6–3	266	213	+53	14.78	11.83
2	Toronto Rock – x	18	9	9	.500	4.0	4–5	5–4	219	200	+19	12.17	11.11
3	New England Black Wolves – x	18	8	10	.444	5.0	5–4	3–6	220	244	−24	12.22	13.56
4	Rochester Knighthawks	18	7	11	.389	6.0	4–5	3–6	175	209	−34	9.72	11.61
5	Buffalo Bandits	18	6	12	.333	7.0	3–6	3–6	226	251	−25	12.56	13.94

West Division
P	Team	GP	W	L	PCT	GB	Home	Road	GF	GA	Diff	GF/GP	GA/GP
1	Saskatchewan Rush – xy	18	12	6	.667	0.0	8–1	4–5	231	212	+19	12.83	11.78
2	Vancouver Stealth – x	18	9	9	.500	3.0	4–5	5–4	218	221	−3	12.11	12.28
3	Colorado Mammoth – x	18	9	9	.500	3.0	5–4	4–5	202	199	+3	11.22	11.06
4	Calgary Roughnecks	18	8	10	.444	4.0	5–4	3–6	212	220	−8	11.78	12.22

x: Clinched playoff berth; c: Clinched playoff berth by crossing over to another division; y: Clinched division; z: Clinched best regular season record; GP: Games Played
W: Wins; L: Losses; GB: Games back; PCT: Win percentage; Home: Record at Home; Road: Record on the Road; GF: Goals scored; GA: Goals allowed
Differential: Difference between goals scored and allowed; GF/GP: Average number of goals scored per game; GA/GP: Average number of goals allowed per game

== Game log ==
=== Regular season ===
Game	Date	Opponent	Location	Score	OT	Attendance	Record
1	December 29, 2016	@ Rochester Knighthawks	Blue Cross Arena	W 12–5		8,137	1–0
2	January 14, 2017	Saskatchewan Rush	Air Canada Centre	W 13–11		10,275	2–0
3	January 28, 2017	Rochester Knighthawks	Air Canada Centre	L 8–9		10,817	2–1
4	February 3, 2017	Buffalo Bandits	Air Canada Centre	W 18–10		8,314	3–1
5	February 12, 2017	@ Calgary Roughnecks	Scotiabank Saddledome	W 11–7		8,635	4–1
6	February 17, 2017	Georgia Swarm	Air Canada Centre	L 12–13	OT	8,385	4–2
7	February 18, 2017	@ Rochester Knighthawks	Blue Cross Arena	W 10–6		5,483	5–2
8	February 25, 2017	@ Buffalo Bandits	KeyBank Center	L 12–15		14,803	5–3
9	March 3, 2017	New England Black Wolves	Air Canada Centre	L 9–10	OT	8,477	5–4
10	March 11, 2017	Calgary Roughnecks	Air Canada Centre	W 16–10		10,370	6–4
11	March 17, 2017	Colorado Mammoth	Air Canada Centre	L 11–14		8,596	6–5
12	March 24, 2017	@ Georgia Swarm	Infinite Energy Arena	W 12–11	OT	3,654	7–5
13	March 25, 2017	Vancouver Stealth	Air Canada Centre	W 13–7		9,266	8–5
14	March 31, 2017	@ Vancouver Stealth	Langley Events Centre	L 11–14		3,013	8–6
15	April 2, 2017	@ New England Black Wolves	Mohegan Sun Arena	L 14–15		5,255	8–7
16	April 14, 2017	Buffalo Bandits	Air Canada Centre	L 8–13		12,113	8–8
17	April 22, 2017	@ Saskatchewan Rush	SaskTel Centre	L 10–15		15,045	8–9
18	April 29, 2017	@ Buffalo Bandits	KeyBank Center	W 19–15		18,417	9–9

=== Playoffs ===
Game	Date	Opponent	Location	Score	OT	Attendance	Record
Eastern Division Semi-final	May 6, 2017	New England Black Wolves	Air Canada Centre	W 18–10		6,260	1–0
Eastern final (Game 1)	May 13, 2017	Georgia Swarm	Air Canada Centre	L 8–11		7,329	1–1
Eastern final (Game 2)	May 20, 2017	@ Georgia Swarm	Infinite Energy Arena	L 9–13		6,382	1–2

== Roster ==
Toronto Rock roster
Active (21-man) roster		Inactive roster	Coaches
Goaltenders: 35 (Canada) Brandon Miller; 66 (Canada) Nick Rose; Defensemen: 22 (Canada) Phil Caputo; 5 (Canada) Sandy Chapman (A); 45 (Canada) Damon Edwards; 93 (Canada) Latrell Harris; 91 (Canada) Bill Hostrawser; 20 (Canada) Bradley Kri; 82 (Canada) Jordan Magnuson	Forwards: 10 (Canada) Rob Hellyer; 11 (Canada) Brett Hickey; 16 (Canada) Adam Jones; 17 (Canada) Stephan Leblanc (A); 41 (Canada) Dan Lintner; 6 (United States) Kieran McArdle; 97 (Canada) Reid Reinholdt; 26 (United States) Tom Schreiber; Transition: 37 (Canada) Brodie Merrill (C); 3 (Canada) Brock Sorensen (T)	Practice Squad: 1 (Canada) Riley Hutchcraft; 47 (Canada) Adam Jay; 27 (Canada) Darryl Robertson; 61 (Canada) Brandon Slade; Injured Reserve: 15 (Canada) Turner Evans; 23 (Canada) Challen Rogers; Holdout: 4 (Canada) Jesse Gamble; Protected list: 99 (United States) Paul Rabil (T)	Head Coach {{{Head Coach}}} Legend: * Suspended list; (C) Captain; (A) Alternate captain; Roster updated 2017-12-03; NLL Transactions

=== Entry Draft ===
The 2016 NLL Entry Draft took place on September 26, 2016. The Rock made the following selections:

Round	Overall	Player	College/Club
1	2	Challen Rogers	
2	12	Latrell Harris	
3	23	Jordan Magnuson	
5	42	Jackson Hullbert	
6	50	Jamie McMahon	

== See also ==
- 2017 NLL season
