= 2017 Buffalo Bandits season =

2017 Buffalo Bandits
- League: NLL
- Division: 5th East
- 2017 record: 6–12
- Home record: 3–6
- Road record: 3–6
- Goals for: 226
- Goals against: 251
- General Manager: Steve Dietrich
- Coach: Troy Cordingley
- Captain: Billy Dee Smith
- Arena: KeyBank Center
- Average attendance: 15,148

Team leaders
- Goals: Ryan Benesch (33)
- Assists: Dhane Smith (51)
- Points: Dhane Smith (81)
- Penalties in minutes: Mitch de Snoo (42)
- Loose Balls: Steve Priolo (131)
- Wins: Anthony Cosmo (5)
- Goals against average: Anthony Cosmo (13.58)

The Buffalo Bandits are a lacrosse team based in Buffalo, New York playing in the National Lacrosse League (NLL). The 2017 season was their 26th season in the NLL.

Buffalo took a massive step back in 2017, after falling in the Championship to Saskatchewan in 2016. The Bandits began the season by losing five of their first six games, but followed up with a three-game win streak to keep their playoff hopes alive at midseason. However, Buffalo would only win two more games for the rest of the season, with the team going on two separate three-game losing streaks in the back half of the regular season.

Buffalo finished with a 6–12 record, which remains their worst record in franchise history as of 2026. This is also the most recent season where the Bandits finished with the worst record in the NLL.

== Regular season ==
=== Final standings ===
East Division
P	Team	GP	W	L	PCT	GB	Home	Road	GF	GA	Diff	GF/GP	GA/GP
1	Georgia Swarm – xyz	18	13	5	.722	0.0	7–2	6–3	266	213	+53	14.78	11.83
2	Toronto Rock – x	18	9	9	.500	4.0	4–5	5–4	219	200	+19	12.17	11.11
3	New England Black Wolves – x	18	8	10	.444	5.0	5–4	3–6	220	244	−24	12.22	13.56
4	Rochester Knighthawks	18	7	11	.389	6.0	4–5	3–6	175	209	−34	9.72	11.61
5	Buffalo Bandits	18	6	12	.333	7.0	3–6	3–6	226	251	−25	12.56	13.94

West Division
P	Team	GP	W	L	PCT	GB	Home	Road	GF	GA	Diff	GF/GP	GA/GP
1	Saskatchewan Rush – xy	18	12	6	.667	0.0	8–1	4–5	231	212	+19	12.83	11.78
2	Vancouver Stealth – x	18	9	9	.500	3.0	4–5	5–4	218	221	−3	12.11	12.28
3	Colorado Mammoth – x	18	9	9	.500	3.0	5–4	4–5	202	199	+3	11.22	11.06
4	Calgary Roughnecks	18	8	10	.444	4.0	5–4	3–6	212	220	−8	11.78	12.22

x: Clinched playoff berth; c: Clinched playoff berth by crossing over to another division; y: Clinched division; z: Clinched best regular season record; GP: Games Played
W: Wins; L: Losses; GB: Games back; PCT: Win percentage; Home: Record at Home; Road: Record on the Road; GF: Goals scored; GA: Goals allowed
Differential: Difference between goals scored and allowed; GF/GP: Average number of goals scored per game; GA/GP: Average number of goals allowed per game

=== Game log ===
Game	Date	Opponent	Location	Score	OT	Attendance	Record
1	December 30, 2016	Colorado Mammoth	KeyBank Center	L 8–12		14,268	0–1
2	January 14, 2017	Georgia Swarm	KeyBank Center	L 14–18		14,268	0–2
3	January 21, 2017	Vancouver Stealth	KeyBank Center	W 21–15		12,903	1–2
4	January 28, 2017	@ New England Black Wolves	Mohegan Sun Arena	L 12–13		7,074	1–3
5	February 3, 2017	@ Toronto Rock	Air Canada Centre	L 10–18		8,314	1–4
6	February 17, 2017	New England Black Wolves	KeyBank Center	L 11–14		13,813	1–5
7	February 19, 2017	@ New England Black Wolves	Mohegan Sun Arena	W 16–15	OT	5,381	2–5
8	February 25, 2017	Toronto Rock	KeyBank Center	W 15–12		14,803	3–5
9	March 3, 2017	Rochester Knighthawks	KeyBank Center	W 13–9		14,475	4–5
10	March 4, 2017	@ Rochester Knighthawks	Blue Cross Arena	L 8–9	OT	6,102	4–6
11	March 17, 2017	@ Vancouver Stealth	Langley Events Centre	W 15–11		2,853	5–6
12	March 25, 2017	@ Rochester Knighthawks	Blue Cross Arena	L 10–11		8,765	5–7
13	April 1, 2017	Saskatchewan Rush	KeyBank Center	L 14–17		16,419	5–8
14	April 8, 2017	@ Calgary Roughnecks	Scotiabank Saddledome	L 8–13		10,855	5–9
15	April 14, 2017	@ Toronto Rock	Air Canada Centre	W 13–8		12,113	6–9
16	April 15, 2017	@ Georgia Swarm	Infinite Energy Arena	L 16–17		3,528	6–10
17	April 22, 2017	Georgia Swarm	KeyBank Center	L 7–20		16,833	6–11
18	April 29, 2017	Toronto Rock	KeyBank Center	L 15–19		18,417	6–12

== Roster ==
2017 Buffalo Bandits roster
Active (21-man) roster		Inactive roster	Coaches
Goaltenders: 44 (Canada) Anthony Cosmo; 65 (Canada) Davide DiRuscio; Defensemen: 12 (Canada) Mitch de Snoo; 23 (Canada) Steve Priolo (A); 3 (Canada) Billy Dee Smith (C); 5 (Canada) Adam Will	Forwards: 17 (Canada) Ryan Benesch; 19 (Canada) Chad Culp; 21 (Canada) Tyler Ferreira; 93 (Canada) Anthony Malcom; 92 (Canada) Dhane Smith; 9 (Canada) Mark Steenhuis; 36 (Canada) Daryl Veltman; Transition: 13 (Canada) David Brock (A); 8 (Canada) Kevin Brownell; 66 (Haudenosaunee) Alex Kedoh Hill; 24 (Canada) Mitch Jones; 75 (Canada) Jay Thorimbert; 22 (Canada) Andrew Watt; 20 (Canada) Nick Weiss	Injured reserve: 15 (Canada) Matthew Bennett; 55 (Canada) Mitch Wilde	Head coach {{{Head Coach}}} Legend: * Suspended list; (C) Captain; (A) Alternate captain; Roster updated 2016-01-04; NLL Transactions

=== Entry Draft ===
The 2016 NLL Entry Draft took place on September 26, 2016. The Bandits made the following selections:

Round	Overall	Player	College/Club
2	13	Justin Martin	
2	18	Kevin Orleman	
3	31	TJ Sanders	
4	39	Bryce Brochu	
5	47	Drake Smith	
6	52	Logan Holmes	

== Player stats ==
Player	GP	G	A	Pts	LB	PIM
Dhane Smith	14	30	51	81	63	8
Mitch Jones	18	31	38	69	93	2
Ryan Benesch	14	33	35	68	62	7
Mark Steenhuis	18	24	43	67	67	32
Brad Self	12	13	23	36	75	4
Alexander-Kedoh-Hill	14	12	20	32	85	22
Tony Malcom	9	12	19	31	29	0
Craig England	12	17	7	24	23	6
Pat Saunders	10	17	6	23	25	2
Steve Priolo	18	7	15	22	131	27
Totals		226	334	560	1,310	311

=== Goaltenders ===
Player	GP	MIN	W	L	GA	Sv%	GAA
Anthony Cosmo	18	583:01	5	6	132	.768	13.58
Davide DiRuscio	18	498:23	1	6	116	.746	13.97
Totals		1,081:24	6	12	248	.758	13.76

== See also ==
- 2017 NLL season
