= 2017 Rochester Knighthawks season =

2017 Rochester Knighthawks
- League: NLL
- Division: 4th East
- 2017 record: 7-11
- Home record: 4-5
- Road record: 3-6
- Goals for: 175
- Goals against: 209
- General Manager: Curt Styres
- Coach: Mike Hasen
- Captain: Sid Smith
- Alternate captains: Scott Campbell
- Arena: Blue Cross Arena
- Average attendance: 6,755

Team leaders
- Goals: Joe Resetarits (27)
- Assists: Joe Resetarits (39)
- Points: Joe Resetarits (66)
- Penalties in minutes: Paul Dawson (30)
- Loose Balls: Graeme Hossack (125)
- Wins: Matt Vinc (6)
- Goals against average: Matt Vinc (11.37)

The Rochester Knighthawks were a lacrosse team based in Rochester, New York, that played in the National Lacrosse League (NLL). The 2017 season was the 23rd in franchise history.

== Regular season ==
=== Final standings ===
East Division
P	Team	GP	W	L	PCT	GB	Home	Road	GF	GA	Diff	GF/GP	GA/GP
1	Georgia Swarm – xyz	18	13	5	.722	0.0	7–2	6–3	266	213	+53	14.78	11.83
2	Toronto Rock – x	18	9	9	.500	4.0	4–5	5–4	219	200	+19	12.17	11.11
3	New England Black Wolves – x	18	8	10	.444	5.0	5–4	3–6	220	244	−24	12.22	13.56
4	Rochester Knighthawks	18	7	11	.389	6.0	4–5	3–6	175	209	−34	9.72	11.61
5	Buffalo Bandits	18	6	12	.333	7.0	3–6	3–6	226	251	−25	12.56	13.94

West Division
P	Team	GP	W	L	PCT	GB	Home	Road	GF	GA	Diff	GF/GP	GA/GP
1	Saskatchewan Rush – xy	18	12	6	.667	0.0	8–1	4–5	231	212	+19	12.83	11.78
2	Vancouver Stealth – x	18	9	9	.500	3.0	4–5	5–4	218	221	−3	12.11	12.28
3	Colorado Mammoth – x	18	9	9	.500	3.0	5–4	4–5	202	199	+3	11.22	11.06
4	Calgary Roughnecks	18	8	10	.444	4.0	5–4	3–6	212	220	−8	11.78	12.22

x: Clinched playoff berth; c: Clinched playoff berth by crossing over to another division; y: Clinched division; z: Clinched best regular season record; GP: Games Played
W: Wins; L: Losses; GB: Games back; PCT: Win percentage; Home: Record at Home; Road: Record on the Road; GF: Goals scored; GA: Goals allowed
Differential: Difference between goals scored and allowed; GF/GP: Average number of goals scored per game; GA/GP: Average number of goals allowed per game

== Game log ==
Game	Date	Opponent	Location	Score	OT	Attendance	Record
1	December 29, 2016	Toronto Rock	Blue Cross Arena	L 5–12		8,137	0–1
2	January 7, 2017	New England Black Wolves	Blue Cross Arena	W 15–8		6,256	1–1
3	January 21, 2017	@ Saskatchewan Rush	SaskTel Centre	L 8–16		15,007	1–2
4	January 28, 2017	@ Toronto Rock	Air Canada Centre	W 9–8		10,817	2–2
5	February 3, 2017	@ New England Black Wolves	Mohegan Sun Arena	L 9–10	OT	4,543	2–3
6	February 11, 2017	Saskatchewan Rush	Blue Cross Arena	L 12–21		7,194	2–4
7	February 18, 2017	Toronto Rock	Blue Cross Arena	L 6–10		5,483	2–5
8	February 19, 2017	@ Georgia Swarm	Infinite Energy Arena	L 9–15		4,170	2–6
9	February 25, 2017	@ Vancouver Stealth	Langley Events Centre	W 12–8		2,651	3–6
10	March 3, 2017	@ Buffalo Bandits	KeyBank Center	L 9–13		14,475	3–7
11	March 4, 2017	Buffalo Bandits	Blue Cross Arena	W 9–8	OT	6,102	4–7
12	March 17, 2017	@ New England Black Wolves	Mohegan Sun Arena	L 11–12		4,449	4–8
13	March 25, 2017	Buffalo Bandits	Blue Cross Arena	W 11–10		8,765	5–8
14	April 1, 2017	Calgary Roughnecks	Blue Cross Arena	L 9–11		6,824	5–9
15	April 15, 2017	@ Colorado Mammoth	Pepsi Center	L 7–13		16,003	5–10
16	April 22, 2017	New England Black Wolves	Blue Cross Arena	W 15–13		5,816	6–10
17	April 28, 2017	Georgia Swarm	Blue Cross Arena	L 10–13		6,221	6–11
18	April 29, 2017	@ Georgia Swarm	Infinite Energy Arena	W 9–8		5,126	7–11

== Roster ==
Rochester Knighthawks roster
Active (21-man) roster		Inactive roster	Coaches
Goaltenders: 55 (Iroquois) Angus Goodleaf; 48 (Canada) Matt Vinc; Defensemen: 37 (Canada) Scott Campbell; 2 (Canada) Paul Dawson; 16 (Canada) Dylan Evans; 26 (Canada) Mike Kirk (A); 29 (Canada) Ian Llord; 19 (Canada) Zac Reid; 5 (Canada) Scott Self; 79 (Iroquois) Sid Smith (C); 32 (Canada) Jon Sullivan	Forwards: 6 (Canada) Dan Dawson; 88 (Iroquois) Cody Jamieson (A); 28 (Iroquois) Stephen Keogh; 9 (Iroquois) Craig Point; 15 (United States) Joe Resetarits; 23 (Canada) Cory Vitarelli; 1 (United States) Joe Walters; Transition: 91 (Canada) Joel Matthews; 25 (Canada) Brad Self	Practice squad: 66 (Iroquois) Zach Williams (T)	Head coach {{{Head Coach}}} Legend: * Suspended list; (C) Captain; (A) Alternate captain; updated 2015-05-01; NLL Transactions

=== Entry Draft ===
The 2016 NLL Entry Draft took place on September 26, 2016. The Knighthawks made the following selections:

Round	Overall	Player	College/Club
1	6	Josh Currier	
1	7	Kyle Jackson	
2	16	Dan Lomas	
4	34	Tyler Albrecht	
5	43	Luke Laszkiewicz	
6	51	Brine Rice	

== See also ==
- 2017 NLL season
