= 2017 Calgary Roughnecks season =

2017 Calgary Roughnecks
- League: NLL
- Division: 4th West
- 2017 record: 8-10
- Home record: 5-4
- Road record: 3-6
- Goals for: 212
- Goals against: 220
- General Manager: Mike Board
- Coach: Curt Malawsky
- Captain: Mike Carnegie
- Arena: Scotiabank Saddledome
- Average attendance: 11,622

Team leaders
- Goals: Curtis Dickson (54)
- Assists: Curtis Dickson (54)
- Points: Curtis Dickson (108)
- Penalties in minutes: Greg Harnett (50)
- Loose Balls: Tyson Bell (108)
- Wins: Frank Scigliano (8)
- Goals against average: Frank Scigliano (12.00)

The Calgary Roughnecks are a lacrosse team based in Calgary playing in the National Lacrosse League (NLL). The 2017 season is the 16th in franchise history.

== Final standings ==
East Division
P	Team	GP	W	L	PCT	GB	Home	Road	GF	GA	Diff	GF/GP	GA/GP
1	Georgia Swarm – xyz	18	13	5	.722	0.0	7–2	6–3	266	213	+53	14.78	11.83
2	Toronto Rock – x	18	9	9	.500	4.0	4–5	5–4	219	200	+19	12.17	11.11
3	New England Black Wolves – x	18	8	10	.444	5.0	5–4	3–6	220	244	−24	12.22	13.56
4	Rochester Knighthawks	18	7	11	.389	6.0	4–5	3–6	175	209	−34	9.72	11.61
5	Buffalo Bandits	18	6	12	.333	7.0	3–6	3–6	226	251	−25	12.56	13.94

West Division
P	Team	GP	W	L	PCT	GB	Home	Road	GF	GA	Diff	GF/GP	GA/GP
1	Saskatchewan Rush – xy	18	12	6	.667	0.0	8–1	4–5	231	212	+19	12.83	11.78
2	Vancouver Stealth – x	18	9	9	.500	3.0	4–5	5–4	218	221	−3	12.11	12.28
3	Colorado Mammoth – x	18	9	9	.500	3.0	5–4	4–5	202	199	+3	11.22	11.06
4	Calgary Roughnecks	18	8	10	.444	4.0	5–4	3–6	212	220	−8	11.78	12.22

x: Clinched playoff berth; c: Clinched playoff berth by crossing over to another division; y: Clinched division; z: Clinched best regular season record; GP: Games Played
W: Wins; L: Losses; GB: Games back; PCT: Win percentage; Home: Record at Home; Road: Record on the Road; GF: Goals scored; GA: Goals allowed
Differential: Difference between goals scored and allowed; GF/GP: Average number of goals scored per game; GA/GP: Average number of goals allowed per game

== Game log ==
=== Regular season ===
Game	Date	Opponent	Location	Score	OT	Attendance	Record
1	January 6, 2017	Vancouver Stealth	Scotiabank Saddledome	L 11–12		11,510	0–1
2	January 14, 2017	@ Vancouver Stealth	Langley Events Centre	W 14–10		3,513	1–1
3	January 20, 2017	@ Colorado Mammoth	Pepsi Center	W 14–12		12,735	2–1
4	January 28, 2017	Colorado Mammoth	Scotiabank Saddledome	W 12–8		11,280	3–1
5	February 4, 2017	Saskatchewan Rush	Scotiabank Saddledome	L 11–15		13,558	3–2
6	February 12, 2017	Toronto Rock	Scotiabank Saddledome	L 7–11		8,635	3–3
7	February 18, 2017	Vancouver Stealth	Scotiabank Saddledome	L 10–13		9,361	3–4
8	February 25, 2017	@ Saskatchewan Rush	SaskTel Centre	L 11–12	OT	15,045	3–5
9	March 3, 2017	@ Colorado Mammoth	Pepsi Center	L 9–18		15,898	3–6
10	March 4, 2017	Georgia Swarm	Scotiabank Saddledome	W 18–11		9,780	4–6
11	March 11, 2017	@ Toronto Rock	Air Canada Centre	L 10–16		10,370	4–7
12	March 17, 2017	@ Georgia Swarm	Infinite Energy Arena	L 8–17		3,793	4–8
13	March 24, 2017	@ Saskatchewan Rush	SaskTel Centre	L 10–13		15,039	4–9
14	March 26, 2017	New England Black Wolves	Scotiabank Saddledome	W 18–13		10,775	5–9
15	April 1, 2017	@ Rochester Knighthawks	Blue Cross Arena	W 11–9		6,824	6–9
16	April 8, 2017	Buffalo Bandits	Scotiabank Saddledome	W 13–8		10,855	7–9
17	April 15, 2017	@ Vancouver Stealth	Langley Events Centre	L 11–15		3,725	7–10
18	April 29, 2017	Saskatchewan Rush	Scotiabank Saddledome	W 14–7		18,845	8–10

=== Entry Draft ===
The 2016 NLL Entry Draft took place on September 26, 2016. The Roughnecks made the following selections:

Round	Overall	Player	College/Club
1	5	Holden Cattoni	
2	15	Vaughn Harris	
2	21	Matt Symes	
3	26	Brody Eastwood	
3	27	Keegan Rittinger	
4	36	Jake Archdekin	
5	45	Tony Tremblay	
6	53	Austin Rockwell	

== See also ==
- 2017 NLL season
