= 2017 Georgia Swarm season =

National Lacrosse League season

2017 Georgia Swarm
- NLL Champions
- East Division Champions
- League: NLL
- Division: 1st East
- 2017 record: 13-5
- Home record: 7-2
- Road record: 6-3
- Goals for: 266
- Goals against: 213
- General Manager: John J. Arlotta
- Coach: Ed Comeau
- Captain: Jordan MacIntosh
- Alternate captains: Shayne Jackson; Jason Noble
- Arena: Infinite Energy Arena
- Average attendance: 3,950

Team leaders
- Goals: Lyle Thompson (45)
- Assists: Lyle Thompson (71)
- Points: Lyle Thompson (116)
- Penalties in minutes: Jason Noble (35)
- Loose Balls: Jordan MacIntosh (153)
- Wins: Mike Poulin (12)
- Goals against average: Brodie MacDonald (11.70)

The 2017 Georgia Swarm season is the 2nd season of the Georgia Swarm, a lacrosse team based in Duluth, Georgia playing in the National Lacrosse League. The team was formerly based in Saint Paul, Minnesota and was known as the Minnesota Swarm.

== Regular season ==
=== Final standings ===
East Division
P	Team	GP	W	L	PCT	GB	Home	Road	GF	GA	Diff	GF/GP	GA/GP
1	Georgia Swarm – xyz	18	13	5	.722	0.0	7–2	6–3	266	213	+53	14.78	11.83
2	Toronto Rock – x	18	9	9	.500	4.0	4–5	5–4	219	200	+19	12.17	11.11
3	New England Black Wolves – x	18	8	10	.444	5.0	5–4	3–6	220	244	−24	12.22	13.56
4	Rochester Knighthawks	18	7	11	.389	6.0	4–5	3–6	175	209	−34	9.72	11.61
5	Buffalo Bandits	18	6	12	.333	7.0	3–6	3–6	226	251	−25	12.56	13.94

West Division
P	Team	GP	W	L	PCT	GB	Home	Road	GF	GA	Diff	GF/GP	GA/GP
1	Saskatchewan Rush – xy	18	12	6	.667	0.0	8–1	4–5	231	212	+19	12.83	11.78
2	Vancouver Stealth – x	18	9	9	.500	3.0	4–5	5–4	218	221	−3	12.11	12.28
3	Colorado Mammoth – x	18	9	9	.500	3.0	5–4	4–5	202	199	+3	11.22	11.06
4	Calgary Roughnecks	18	8	10	.444	4.0	5–4	3–6	212	220	−8	11.78	12.22

x: Clinched playoff berth; c: Clinched playoff berth by crossing over to another division; y: Clinched division; z: Clinched best regular season record; GP: Games Played
W: Wins; L: Losses; GB: Games back; PCT: Win percentage; Home: Record at Home; Road: Record on the Road; GF: Goals scored; GA: Goals allowed
Differential: Difference between goals scored and allowed; GF/GP: Average number of goals scored per game; GA/GP: Average number of goals allowed per game

=== Game log ===
Game	Date	Opponent	Location	Score	OT	Attendance	Record
1	January 7, 2017	Saskatchewan Rush	Infinite Energy Arena	W 18–10		4,809	1–0
2	January 14, 2017	@ Buffalo Bandits	KeyBank Center	W 18–14		13,915	2–0
3	January 20, 2017	New England Black Wolves	Infinite Energy Arena	W 14–9		2,386	3–0
4	January 28, 2017	@ Vancouver Stealth	Langley Events Centre	W 14–12		3,456	4–0
5	February 4, 2017	@ Colorado Mammoth	Pepsi Center	L 10–14		15,254	4–1
6	February 11, 2017	New England Black Wolves	Infinite Energy Arena	W 17–15		4,189	5–1
7	February 17, 2017	@ Toronto Rock	Air Canada Centre	W 13–12	OT	8,385	6–1
8	February 19, 2017	Rochester Knighthawks	Infinite Energy Arena	W 15–9		4,170	7–1
9	March 4, 2017	@ Calgary Roughnecks	Scotiabank Saddledome	L 11–18		9,780	7–2
10	March 12, 2017	@ New England Black Wolves	Mohegan Sun Arena	L 8–13		5,324	7–3
11	March 17, 2017	Calgary Roughnecks	Infinite Energy Arena	W 17–8		3,793	8–3
12	March 24, 2017	Toronto Rock	Infinite Energy Arena	L 11–12	OT	3,654	8–4
13	April 1, 2017	Colorado Mammoth	Infinite Energy Arena	W 21–13		3,903	9–4
14	April 7, 2017	@ New England Black Wolves	Mohegan Sun Arena	W 21–12		5,205	10–4
15	April 15, 2017	Buffalo Bandits	Infinite Energy Arena	W 17–16		3,528	11–4
16	April 22, 2017	@ Buffalo Bandits	KeyBank Center	W 20–7		16,833	12–4
17	April 28, 2017	@ Rochester Knighthawks	Blue Cross Arena	W 13–10		6,221	13–4
18	April 29, 2017	Rochester Knighthawks	Infinite Energy Arena	L 8–9		5,126	13–5

=== Playoffs ===
Game	Date	Opponent	Location	Score	OT	Attendance	Record
Eastern Final (Game 1)	May 13, 2017	@ Toronto Rock	Air Canada Centre	W 11–8		7,329	1–0
Eastern Final (Game 2)	May 20, 2017	Toronto Rock	Infinite Energy Arena	W 13–9		6,382	2–0
Finals (Game 1)	June 4, 2017	Saskatchewan Rush	Infinite Energy Arena	W 18–14		7,642	3–0
Finals (Game 2)	June 10, 2017	@ Saskatchewan Rush	SaskTel Centre	W 15–14	OT	14,264	4–0

== Roster ==
Georgia Swarm roster
Active (21-man) roster		Inactive roster	Coaches
Goaltenders: 50 (Canada) Brodie MacDonald; 30 (Canada) Mike Poulin; Defensemen: 13 (Canada) Connor Sellars; 85 (United States) Mitch Belisle; 10 (Canada) Alex Crepinsek; 25 (Canada) Leo Stouros; 31 (United States) John Ranagan	Forwards: 32 (Canada) Shayne Jackson (A); 46 (Canada) Kiel Matisz; 83 (Haudenosaunee) Randy Staats; 22 (Haudenosaunee) Jerome Thompson; 4 (Haudenosaunee) Lyle Thompson; 2 (Haudenosaunee) Miles Thompson; 20 (Canada) Jordan Hall; Transition: 24 (Canada) Jordan MacIntosh (C); 45 (Canada) Jason Noble (A); 37 (Canada) Ethan O'Connor; 44 (Canada) Chad Tutton; 55 (Canada) Bryan Cole; 98 (Canada) Sean Young	Practice squad: 35 (United States) Adam Shute (G); 21 (United States) Liam Byrnes (T); 56 (Canada) Drew Petkoff (D); 76 (Haudenosaunee) Warren Hill (G)	Head coach {{{Head Coach}}} Legend: * Suspended list; (C) Captain; (A) Alternate captain; updated 2017-01-30; NLL Transactions

=== Entry Draft ===
The 2016 NLL Entry Draft took place on September 26, 2016. The Swarm made the following selections:

Round	Overall	Player	College/Club
1	4	Bryan Cole	
1	10	Connor Sellars	
2	17	Leo Stouros	
2	20	Warren Hill	
3	22	Lachlan Elder	
3	25	Brayden Hill	
3	28	Matt Kavanagh	
5	44	Liam Byrnes	

== See also ==
- 2017 NLL season
