= 2017 Colorado Mammoth season =

2017 Colorado Mammoth
- League: NLL
- Division: 3rd West
- 2017 record: 9-9
- Home record: 5-4
- Road record: 4-5
- Goals for: 202
- Goals against: 199
- General Manager: Steve Govett
- Coach: Dan Stroup, Pat Coyle, Chris Gill
- Captain: Dan Coates
- Alternate captains: John Grant, Jr; Zack Greer
- Arena: Pepsi Center
- Average attendance: 14,458

Team leaders
- Goals: Callum Crawford (36)
- Assists: Callum Crawford (62)
- Points: Callum Crawford (98)
- Penalties in minutes: Bryce Sweeting (33)
- Loose Balls: Cameron Holding (160)
- Wins: Dillon Ward (9)
- Goals against average: Alex Buque (10.34)

The Colorado Mammoth are a lacrosse team based in Denver, Colorado playing in the National Lacrosse League (NLL). The 2017 season was the 31st in franchise history and 15th as the Mammoth (previously the Washington Power, Pittsburgh Crossefire, and Baltimore Thunder).

== Final standings ==
East Division
P	Team	GP	W	L	PCT	GB	Home	Road	GF	GA	Diff	GF/GP	GA/GP
1	Georgia Swarm – xyz	18	13	5	.722	0.0	7–2	6–3	266	213	+53	14.78	11.83
2	Toronto Rock – x	18	9	9	.500	4.0	4–5	5–4	219	200	+19	12.17	11.11
3	New England Black Wolves – x	18	8	10	.444	5.0	5–4	3–6	220	244	−24	12.22	13.56
4	Rochester Knighthawks	18	7	11	.389	6.0	4–5	3–6	175	209	−34	9.72	11.61
5	Buffalo Bandits	18	6	12	.333	7.0	3–6	3–6	226	251	−25	12.56	13.94

West Division
P	Team	GP	W	L	PCT	GB	Home	Road	GF	GA	Diff	GF/GP	GA/GP
1	Saskatchewan Rush – xy	18	12	6	.667	0.0	8–1	4–5	231	212	+19	12.83	11.78
2	Vancouver Stealth – x	18	9	9	.500	3.0	4–5	5–4	218	221	−3	12.11	12.28
3	Colorado Mammoth – x	18	9	9	.500	3.0	5–4	4–5	202	199	+3	11.22	11.06
4	Calgary Roughnecks	18	8	10	.444	4.0	5–4	3–6	212	220	−8	11.78	12.22

x: Clinched playoff berth; c: Clinched playoff berth by crossing over to another division; y: Clinched division; z: Clinched best regular season record; GP: Games Played
W: Wins; L: Losses; GB: Games back; PCT: Win percentage; Home: Record at Home; Road: Record on the Road; GF: Goals scored; GA: Goals allowed
Differential: Difference between goals scored and allowed; GF/GP: Average number of goals scored per game; GA/GP: Average number of goals allowed per game

== Game log ==
=== Regular season ===
Game	Date	Opponent	Location	Score	OT	Attendance	Record
1	December 30, 2016	@ Buffalo Bandits	KeyBank Center	W 12–8		14,268	1–0
2	January 7, 2017	Vancouver Stealth	Pepsi Center	L 9–15		14,631	1–1
3	January 14, 2017	New England Black Wolves	Pepsi Center	W 11–10	OT	11,246	2–1
4	January 20, 2017	Calgary Roughnecks	Pepsi Center	L 12–14		12,735	2–2
5	January 28, 2017	@ Calgary Roughnecks	Scotiabank Saddledome	L 8–12		11,280	2–3
6	February 4, 2017	Georgia Swarm	Pepsi Center	W 14–10		15,254	3–3
7	February 12, 2017	@ Vancouver Stealth	Langley Events Centre	W 10–9	OT	3,015	4–3
8	February 18, 2017	@ Saskatchewan Rush	SaskTel Centre	L 7–8		15,037	4–4
9	February 26, 2017	@ New England Black Wolves	Mohegan Sun Arena	W 14–9		5,069	5–4
10	March 3, 2017	Calgary Roughnecks	Pepsi Center	W 18–9		15,898	6–4
11	March 11, 2017	@ Saskatchewan Rush	SaskTel Centre	L 11–12	OT	15,037	6–5
12	March 12, 2017	Vancouver Stealth	Pepsi Center	L 6–10		12,008	6–6
13	March 17, 2017	@ Toronto Rock	Air Canada Centre	W 14–11		8,596	7–6
14	March 25, 2017	Saskatchewan Rush	Pepsi Center	W 14–11		15,144	8–6
15	April 1, 2017	@ Georgia Swarm	Infinite Energy Center	L 13–21		3,903	8–7
16	April 15, 2017	Rochester Knighthawks	Pepsi Center	W 13–7		16,003	9–7
17	April 22, 2017	@ Vancouver Stealth	Langley Events Centre	L 7–13		3,758	9–8
18	April 28, 2017	Saskatchewan Rush	Pepsi Center	L 9–10		17,209	9–9

=== Playoffs ===
Game	Date	Opponent	Location	Score	OT	Attendance	Record
Western division semi-final	May 6, 2017	@ Vancouver Stealth	Langley Events Centre	W 13–12		4,011	1–0
Western final (Game 1)	May 13, 2017	Saskatchewan Rush	Pepsi Center	L 9–18		11,012	1–1
Western final (Game 2)	May 20, 2017	@ Saskatchewan Rush	SaskTel Centre	L 10–11		14,052	1–2

== Roster ==
Colorado Mammoth roster
Active (21-man) roster		Inactive roster	Coaches
Goaltenders: 27 (Canada) Alexis Buque; 45 (Canada) Dillon Ward; Defensemen: 37 (Canada) Dan Coates (C); 82 (Canada) Joey Cupido; 15 (Canada) Ilija Gajic; 19 (Canada) Cameron Holding (A); 18 (Canada) Robert Hope; 23 (Canada) Jordan Gilles; 4 (Canada) Josh Sullivan; 94 (Canada) Bryce Sweeting	Forwards: 98 (Canada) Callum Crawford; 90 (Canada) Jackson Decker; 24 (Canada) John Grant, Jr. (A); 16 (Canada) Adam Jones; 51 (Canada) Eli McLaughlin; 35 (Canada) Jeremy Noble; 17 (Canada) Chris Wardle	Injured reserve: 61 (Canada) Mike Burke (F); 8 (United States) Greg Downing (D)	Head coach {{{Head Coach}}} Legend: * Suspended list; (C) Captain; (A) Alternate captain; updated 2017-04-29; NLL Transactions

== Transactions ==
=== Entry Draft ===
The 2016 NLL Entry Draft took place on September 26, 2016. The Mammoth made the following selections:

Round	Overall	Player	College/Club
1	9	Zach Herreweyers	
4	35	Taylor Stuart	
5	46	Kyle Whitlow	
6	55	Jahmal Shear	

== See also ==
- 2017 NLL season
