= 2017 New England Black Wolves season =

2017 New England Black Wolves
- League: NLL
- Division: 3rd East
- 2017 record: 8-10
- Home record: 5-4
- Road record: 3-6
- Goals for: 220
- Goals against: 244
- General Manager: Chris Seinko
- Coach: Glenn Clark
- Captain: Shawn Evans
- Alternate captains: Brett Manney; Kyle Buchanan
- Arena: Mohegan Sun Arena
- Average attendance: 5,402

Team leaders
- Goals: Kevin Crowley (45)
- Assists: Shawn Evans (66)
- Points: Shawn Evans (104)
- Penalties in minutes: Bill OBrien (59)
- Loose Balls: Jay Thorimbert (192)
- Wins: Evan Kirk (8)
- Goals against average: Evan Kirk (12.83)

The New England Black Wolves are a lacrosse team based in Uncasville, Connecticut playing in the National Lacrosse League (NLL). The 2017 season will be the team's 3rd season in the league.

== Regular season ==
=== Current standings ===
East Division
P	Team	GP	W	L	PCT	GB	Home	Road	GF	GA	Diff	GF/GP	GA/GP
1	Georgia Swarm – xyz	18	13	5	.722	0.0	7–2	6–3	266	213	+53	14.78	11.83
2	Toronto Rock – x	18	9	9	.500	4.0	4–5	5–4	219	200	+19	12.17	11.11
3	New England Black Wolves – x	18	8	10	.444	5.0	5–4	3–6	220	244	−24	12.22	13.56
4	Rochester Knighthawks	18	7	11	.389	6.0	4–5	3–6	175	209	−34	9.72	11.61
5	Buffalo Bandits	18	6	12	.333	7.0	3–6	3–6	226	251	−25	12.56	13.94

West Division
P	Team	GP	W	L	PCT	GB	Home	Road	GF	GA	Diff	GF/GP	GA/GP
1	Saskatchewan Rush – xy	18	12	6	.667	0.0	8–1	4–5	231	212	+19	12.83	11.78
2	Vancouver Stealth – x	18	9	9	.500	3.0	4–5	5–4	218	221	−3	12.11	12.28
3	Colorado Mammoth – x	18	9	9	.500	3.0	5–4	4–5	202	199	+3	11.22	11.06
4	Calgary Roughnecks	18	8	10	.444	4.0	5–4	3–6	212	220	−8	11.78	12.22

x: Clinched playoff berth; c: Clinched playoff berth by crossing over to another division; y: Clinched division; z: Clinched best regular season record; GP: Games Played
W: Wins; L: Losses; GB: Games back; PCT: Win percentage; Home: Record at Home; Road: Record on the Road; GF: Goals scored; GA: Goals allowed
Differential: Difference between goals scored and allowed; GF/GP: Average number of goals scored per game; GA/GP: Average number of goals allowed per game

== Game log ==
Game	Date	Opponent	Location	Score	OT	Attendance	Record
1	January 7, 2017	@ Rochester Knighthawks	Blue Cross Arena	L 8–15		6,256	0–1
2	January 14, 2017	@ Colorado Mammoth	Pepsi Center	L 10–11	OT	11,246	0–2
3	January 20, 2017	@ Georgia Swarm	Infinite Energy Arena	L 9–14		2,386	0–3
4	January 28, 2017	Buffalo Bandits	Mohegan Sun Arena	W 13–12		7,074	1–3
5	February 3, 2017	Rochester Knighthawks	Mohegan Sun Arena	W 10–9	OT	4,543	2–3
6	February 11, 2017	@ Georgia Swarm	Infinite Energy Arena	L 15–17		4,189	2–4
7	February 17, 2017	@ Buffalo Bandits	KeyBank Center	W 14–11		13,813	3–4
8	February 19, 2017	Buffalo Bandits	Mohegan Sun Arena	L 15–16	OT	5,381	3–5
9	February 26, 2017	Colorado Mammoth	Mohegan Sun Arena	L 9–14		5,069	3–6
10	March 3, 2017	@ Toronto Rock	Air Canada Centre	W 10–9	OT	8,477	4–6
11	March 12, 2017	Georgia Swarm	Mohegan Sun Arena	W 13–8		5,324	5–6
12	March 17, 2017	Rochester Knighthawks	Mohegan Sun Arena	W 12–11		4,449	6–6
13	March 26, 2017	@ Calgary Roughnecks	Scotiabank Saddledome	L 13–18		10,775	6–7
14	April 2, 2017	Toronto Rock	Mohegan Sun Arena	W 15–14		5,255	7–7
15	April 7, 2017	Georgia Swarm	Mohegan Sun Arena	L 12–21		5,205	7–8
16	April 15, 2017	@ Saskatchewan Rush	SaskTel Centre	W 13–12	OT	14,532	8–8
17	April 22, 2017	@ Rochester Knighthawks	Blue Cross Arena	L 13–15		5,816	8–9
18	April 29, 2017	Vancouver Stealth	Mohegan Sun Arena	L 16–17	OT	6,326	8–10

=== Playoffs ===
Game	Date	Opponent	Location	Score	OT	Attendance	Record
Eastern division semi-final	May 6, 2017	@ Toronto Rock	Air Canada Centre	L 10–18		6,260	0–1

== Roster ==
New England Black Wolves roster
Active (21-man) roster		Inactive roster	Coaches
Goaltenders: 77 (Canada) Aaron Bold; 30 (Canada) Doug Jamieson; Defensemen: 10 (Iroquois) Adam Bomberry; 4 (Canada) David Brock; 71 (Canada) Sheldon Burns; 24 (Canada) Joel Coyle; 13 (United States) Brett Manney (A); 45 (Canada) Matt Spanger; 7 (Canada) Derek Suddons	Forwards: 27 (United States) Kevin Buchanan; 91 (Canada) Kyle Buchanan (A); 41 (Canada) Mark Cockerton; 21 (Canada) Kevin Crowley; 15 (Canada) Shawn Evans (C); 83 (Canada) JP Kealey; 9 (Canada) Reilly O'Connor; 12 (United States) Seth Oakes; Transition: 33 (Canada) John LaFontaine; 75 (Canada) Jay Thorimbert; 17 (Canada) Colton Watkinson		Head coach {{{Head Coach}}} Legend: * Suspended list; (C) Captain; (A) Alternate captain; Roster updated 2017-12-09; NLL Transactions

=== Entry Draft ===
The 2016 NLL Entry Draft took place on September 26, 2016. The Black Wolves made the following selections:

Round	Overall	Player	College/Club
1	8	Seth Oakes	
2	19	Doug Jamieson	
3	24	Joel Coyle	
3	29	Kyle Trolley	
4	33	Brandon Robinson	
4	37	Myles Jones	
4	38	Dan Michel	
6	54	Garrett Lewis	
6	56	Andrew Mullen	

== See also ==
- 2017 NLL season
