= Johnny Powless =

Haudenosaunee lacrosse player

Personal information
- Nationality: Haudenosaunee
- Born: April 15, 1993 (age 33) Six Nations, Ontario, Canada
- Height: 5 ft 11 in (180 cm)
- Weight: 175 lb (79 kg; 12 st 7 lb)

Sport
- Position: Forward
- Shoots: Left
- NLL draft: 5th overall, 2011; Rochester Knighthawks
- NLL team Former teams: Toronto Rock; New England Black Wolves; Georgia Swarm; Minnesota Swarm; Vancouver Stealth; Rochester Knighthawks
- Pro career: 2012–2020

Johnny Powless (born March 15, 1993, in Six Nations, Ontario) is a Haudenosaunee former professional box lacrosse player. Powless won NLL Championships in each of his first three seasons, and has also won two Mann Cups with the Chiefs.

== NLL career ==
Powless was drafted 5th overall by the Knighthawks in the 2011 entry draft. After winning the NLL Championship with the Knighthawks in his first season (2012), Powless was also given the NLL's Sportsmanship Award. The Knighthawks went on to win the 2013 and 2014 NLL Championships, giving Powless three NLL titles at the age of 21.

== Statistics ==
=== NLL ===
Johnny Powless		Regular season									Playoffs								
Season	Team	GP	G	A	Pts	LB	PIM	Pts/GP	LB/GP	PIM/GP	GP	G	A	Pts	LB	PIM	Pts/GP	LB/GP	PIM/GP
2012	Rochester Knighthawks	16	26	24	50	43	10	3.13	2.69	0.63	3	5	6	11	4	0	3.67	1.33	0.00
2013	Rochester Knighthawks	16	22	19	41	37	5	2.56	2.31	0.31	3	4	6	10	10	0	3.33	3.33	0.00
2014	Rochester Knighthawks	18	30	23	53	50	17	2.94	2.78	0.94	4	4	4	8	6	0	2.00	1.50	0.00
2015	Vancouver Stealth	11	7	32	39	22	2	3.55	2.00	0.18	–	–	–	–	–	–	–	–	–
2015	Minnesota Swarm	6	5	8	13	16	6	2.17	2.67	1.00	–	–	–	–	–	–	–	–	–
2016	Georgia Swarm	18	35	37	72	41	4	4.00	2.28	0.22	1	2	2	4	1	0	4.00	1.00	0.00
2017	Georgia Swarm	10	23	27	50	21	2	5.00	2.10	0.20	3	5	7	12	7	0	4.00	2.33	0.00
2018	Georgia Swarm	7	3	11	14	14	4	2.00	2.00	0.57	–	–	–	–	–	–	–	–	–
2018	New England Black Wolves	10	8	9	17	18	4	1.70	1.80	0.40	1	0	2	2	0	0	2.00	0.00	0.00
2019	Toronto Rock	18	23	21	44	32	0	2.44	1.78	0.00	2	1	0	1	0	2	0.50	0.00	1.00
2020	Toronto Rock	11	7	17	24	22	2	2.18	2.00	0.18	–	–	–	–	–	–	–	–	–
		141	189	228	417	316	56	2.96	2.24	0.40	17	21	27	48	28	2	2.82	1.65	0.12
Career Total:		158	210	255	465	344	58	2.94	2.18	0.37									

GP–Games played; G–Goals; A–Assists; Pts–Points; LB–Loose balls; PIM–Penalty minutes; Pts/GP–Points per games played; LB/GP–Loose balls per games played; PIM/GP–Penalty minutes per games played.

== Awards ==
Preceded by Jordan Hall	NLL Sportsmanship Award; 2012	Succeeded by Garrett Billings
