= 2017 Vancouver Stealth season =

2017 Vancouver Stealth
- League: NLL
- Division: 2nd West
- 2017 record: 9-9
- Home record: 4-5
- Road record: 5-4
- Goals for: 218
- Goals against: 221
- General Manager: Doug Locker
- Coach: Jamie Batley
- Captain: Curtis Hodgson
- Alternate captains: Rhys Duch; Cliff Smith
- Arena: Langley Event Centre
- Average attendance: 3,206

Team leaders
- Goals: Corey Small (46)
- Assists: Corey Small (65)
- Points: Corey Small (111)
- Penalties in minutes: Matt Beers (71)
- Loose Balls: Ian Hawksbee (115)
- Wins: Tye Belanger (7)
- Goals against average: Tye Belanger (11.28)

The Vancouver Stealth are a lacrosse team based in Vancouver, British Columbia. The team plays in the National Lacrosse League (NLL). The 2017 season was the 18th in franchise history and the 4th season in Vancouver. The franchise previously played in Everett, Washington, San Jose, and Albany, New York.

== Regular season ==
=== Final standings ===
East Division
P	Team	GP	W	L	PCT	GB	Home	Road	GF	GA	Diff	GF/GP	GA/GP
1	Georgia Swarm – xyz	18	13	5	.722	0.0	7–2	6–3	266	213	+53	14.78	11.83
2	Toronto Rock – x	18	9	9	.500	4.0	4–5	5–4	219	200	+19	12.17	11.11
3	New England Black Wolves – x	18	8	10	.444	5.0	5–4	3–6	220	244	−24	12.22	13.56
4	Rochester Knighthawks	18	7	11	.389	6.0	4–5	3–6	175	209	−34	9.72	11.61
5	Buffalo Bandits	18	6	12	.333	7.0	3–6	3–6	226	251	−25	12.56	13.94

West Division
P	Team	GP	W	L	PCT	GB	Home	Road	GF	GA	Diff	GF/GP	GA/GP
1	Saskatchewan Rush – xy	18	12	6	.667	0.0	8–1	4–5	231	212	+19	12.83	11.78
2	Vancouver Stealth – x	18	9	9	.500	3.0	4–5	5–4	218	221	−3	12.11	12.28
3	Colorado Mammoth – x	18	9	9	.500	3.0	5–4	4–5	202	199	+3	11.22	11.06
4	Calgary Roughnecks	18	8	10	.444	4.0	5–4	3–6	212	220	−8	11.78	12.22

x: Clinched playoff berth; c: Clinched playoff berth by crossing over to another division; y: Clinched division; z: Clinched best regular season record; GP: Games Played
W: Wins; L: Losses; GB: Games back; PCT: Win percentage; Home: Record at Home; Road: Record on the Road; GF: Goals scored; GA: Goals allowed
Differential: Difference between goals scored and allowed; GF/GP: Average number of goals scored per game; GA/GP: Average number of goals allowed per game

=== Game log ===
Game	Date	Opponent	Location	Score	OT	Attendance	Record
1	January 6, 2017	@ Calgary Roughnecks	Scotiabank Saddledome	W 12–11		11,510	1–0
2	January 7, 2017	@ Colorado Mammoth	Pepsi Center	W 15–9		14,631	2–0
3	January 14, 2017	Calgary Roughnecks	Langley Events Centre	L 10–14		3,513	2–1
4	January 21, 2017	@ Buffalo Bandits	KeyBank Center	L 15–21		12,903	2–2
5	January 27, 2017	@ Saskatchewan Rush	SaskTel Centre	L 12–16		14,502	2–3
6	January 28, 2017	Georgia Swarm	Langley Events Centre	L 12–14		3,456	2–4
7	February 12, 2017	Colorado Mammoth	Langley Events Centre	L 9–10	OT	3,015	2–5
8	February 18, 2017	@ Calgary Roughnecks	Scotiabank Saddledome	W 13–10		9,361	3–5
9	February 25, 2017	Rochester Knighthawks	Langley Events Centre	L 8–12		2,651	3–6
10	March 4, 2017	Saskatchewan Rush	Langley Events Centre	W 13–9		2,876	4–6
11	March 12, 2017	@ Colorado Mammoth	Pepsi Center	W 10–6		12,008	5–6
12	March 17, 2017	Buffalo Bandits	Langley Events Centre	L 11–15		2,853	5–7
13	March 25, 2017	@ Toronto Rock	Air Canada Centre	L 7–13		9,266	5–8
14	March 31, 2017	Toronto Rock	Langley Events Centre	W 14–11		3,013	6–8
15	April 8, 2017	@ Saskatchewan Rush	SaskTel Centre	L 12–16		15,045	6–9
16	April 15, 2017	Calgary Roughnecks	Langley Events Centre	W 15–11		3,725	7–9
17	April 22, 2017	Colorado Mammoth	Langley Events Centre	W 13–7		3,758	8–9
18	April 29, 2017	@ New England Black Wolves	Mohegan Sun Arena	W 17–16	OT	6,326	9–9

=== Playoffs ===
Game	Date	Opponent	Location	Score	OT	Attendance	Record
Western division semi-final	May 6, 2017	Colorado Mammoth	Langley Events Centre	L 12–13		4,011	0–1

== Roster ==
Vancouver Stealth roster
Active (21-man) roster		Inactive roster	Coaches
Goaltenders: 00 (Canada) Tyler Richards; 61 (Canada) Eric Penney; Defensemen: 2 (Canada) Matt Beers; 6 (Canada) Curtis Hodgson (C); 88 (Canada) Ian Hawksbee; 3 (Canada) Jeff Moleski; 4 (United States) Chris O'Dougherty; 42 (Canada) Rory Smith; 16 (Canada) Ryan Wagner	Forwards: 13 (Canada) Garrett Billings; 78 (Canada) Jordan Durston; 10 (Canada) Rhys Duch (A); 55 (Canada) Joel McCready; 18 (Canada) Logan Schuss; 15 (Canada) Corey Small; Transition: 20 (Canada) Travis Cornwall; 32 (Canada) Mitch McMichael; 23 (Canada) Thomas Hoggarth; 19 (Canada) Justin Salt; 43 (Canada) Jarrett Toll	Practice Squad: 9 (Canada) Keegan Bal (F); 63 (Canada) Brandon Clelland; 50 (Canada) Cody Hagedorn (G); Injured Reserve: 91 (Canada) Tyler Garrison; Holdout: 66 (Canada) Connor Brown (F); 14 (Canada) Matt Delmonico (F); 7 (Canada) Connor Goodwin (F); 21 (United States) Tim Henderson (D); 44 (Canada) Brendan Ranford (T); Unable to play: 8 (Canada) Tyler Hass (T); 5 (Canada) Cliff Smith (A) (F)	Head Coach {{{Head Coach}}} Legend: * Suspended list; (C) Captain; (A) Alternate captain; Roster updated 2017-04-29; NLL Transactions

=== Entry Draft ===
The 2016 NLL Entry Draft took place on September 26, 2016. The Stealth made the following selections:

Round	Overall	Player	College/Club
2	11	James Rahe	
4	32	Adam Jay	
5	41	Cody Teichroeb	
6	49	Danton Miller	

== See also ==
- 2017 NLL season
