= Ethan O'Connor =

Canadian lacrosse player (born 1991)

Personal information
- Nationality: Canadian
- Born: March 5, 1991 (age 35) Milton Ontario
- Height: 6 ft 1 in (185 cm)
- Weight: 190 lb (86 kg; 13 st 8 lb)

Sport
- Position: Defense/Transition
- Shoots: Right
- NLL draft: 9th overall, 2013; Toronto Rock
- NLL team: Halifax Thunderbirds (2025-present)
- MSL team: Six Nations Chiefs (2016-present)
- Pro career: 2013–
Medal record
Representing United States
Men's box lacrosse
World Lacrosse Box Championships
Runner-up	2024 Utica

Ethan O'Connor (born March 5, 1991) is a Canadian professional box lacrosse player for the Halifax Thunderbirds of the National Lacrosse League and the Six Nations Chiefs of Major Series Lacrosse. Born in Milton, Ontario, O'Connor began his minor lacrosse career playing for the Milton Mavericks. He was taken by the Burlington Chiefs in the Ontario Junior A Lacrosse draft, was twice named a team captain, and earned First Team All League honors in his final season. During his junior career, O'Connor also played for the Oakville Buzz and Halton Hills Bulldogs of the OLA Junior B Lacrosse League. He played Division I lacrosse for Hobart College. O'Connor was drafted by the Toronto Rock in the first round (9th overall) of the 2013 NLL Entry Draft. After one season with the Rock, he was traded to the Minnesota Swarm (now Georgia Swarm) where he won his first NLL Championship, in 2017. Prior to the 2018–19 season, O'Connor was traded to the Buffalo Bandits and won an NLL championship with them in 2022. Prior to the 2025-26 NLL season, he signed a one-year deal with the Halifax Thunderbirds.

Ethan is also a US citizen, and won silver as a member of Team USA at the 2024 World Lacrosse Box Championships in Utica, NY.
