= National Lacrosse League Sportsmanship Award =

The National Lacrosse League Sportsmanship Award is given annually to a National Lacrosse League (NLL) player. It "honors the combination of character and performance" shown by a player.

== Past winners ==
Season	Winner	Team	Win #	Other finalists
2026	Ryan Keenan	Saskatchewan Rush	1	Kyle Buchanan, Buffalo Bandits; Jeff Teat, Ottawa Black Bears
2025	Kyle Buchanan	Buffalo Bandits	2	Lyle Thompson, Georgia Swarm; Keegan Bal, Vancouver Warriors
2024	Lyle Thompson	Georgia Swarm	6	Keegan Bal, Vancouver Warriors; Tom Schreiber, Toronto Rock
2023	Lyle Thompson	Georgia Swarm	5	Kyle Buchanan, Buffalo Bandits; Tom Schreiber, Toronto Rock
2022	Lyle Thompson	Georgia Swarm	4	Keegan Bal, Vancouver Warriors; Dan Dawson, Toronto Rock
2021	Season cancelled			
2020	Lyle Thompson	Georgia Swarm	3	Kyle Buchanan, San Diego Seals; Curtis Knight, Rochester Knighthawks
2019	Lyle Thompson	Georgia Swarm	2	Dan Dawson, San Diego Seals; Tom Schreiber, Toronto Rock
2018	Lyle Thompson	Georgia Swarm	1	Jordan Gilles, Colorado Mammoth; John LaFontaine, New England Black Wolves
2017	Jordan Hall	Georgia Swarm	2	Kyle Buchanan, New England Black Wolves; Dan MacRae, Calgary Roughnecks
2016	Ben McIntosh	Saskatchewan Rush	1	Karsen Leung, Calgary Roughnecks; Kiel Matisz, Georgia Swarm
2015	Kyle Buchanan	New England Black Wolves	1	Jordan Hall, Rochester Knighthawks; Curtis Hodgson, Vancouver Stealth
2014	Garrett Billings	Toronto Rock	2	Curtis Knight, Edmonton Rush; Shawn Williams, Buffalo Bandits
2013	Garrett Billings	Toronto Rock	1	
2012	Johnny Powless	Rochester Knighthawks	1	
2011	Jordan Hall	Rochester Knighthawks	1	
2010	Shawn Williams	Rochester Knighthawks	1	
2009	Dan Dawson	Boston Blazers	1	
2008	Dan Carey	Colorado Mammoth	1	
2007	Tracey Kelusky	Calgary Roughnecks	1	
2006	Sean Greenhalgh	Philadelphia Wings	1	
2005	Gary Gait	Colorado Mammoth	2	
2004 (Tie)	Gary Gait	Colorado Mammoth	1	
2004 (Tie)	Peter Lough	Arizona Sting	1	
2003	Chris Driscoll	Toronto Rock	1	
2002	Jim Veltman	Toronto Rock	1	
