= Mark Matthews (lacrosse) =

Canadian lacrosse player (born 1990)

Personal information
- Nationality: Canadian
- Born: January 27, 1990 (age 36) Oshawa, Ontario, Canada
- Height: 6 ft 6 in (198 cm)
- Weight: 230 lb (100 kg; 16 st 6 lb)

Sport
- Position: Attack
- Shoots: Left
- NCAA team: Denver (2012)
- NLL draft: 1st overall, 2012; Edmonton Rush
- NLL team Former teams: Toronto Rock; Edmonton/Saskatchewan Rush
- MLL draft: 4th overall, 2012; Denver Outlaws
- MLL teams: Denver Outlaws; New York Lizards; Atlanta Blaze; Ohio Machine; Philadelphia Barrage
- Pro career: 2012–
Medal record
Representing Canada
Men's lacrosse
World Lacrosse Championship
Winner	2014 Denver
Runner-up	2018 Netanya
World Indoor Lacrosse Championship
Winner	2015 Onondaga
Winner	2019 Langley

Mark Matthews (born January 27, 1990) is a Canadian professional lacrosse player for the Toronto Rock in the National Lacrosse League. He won the 2018 NLL MVP award.

He popularized the toe drag dodge, his signature move.

== Early life ==
Matthews played minor hockey growing up in Oshawa and was drafted by the OHL's Saginaw Spirit in 2006.

== College career ==
Matthews played for the University of Denver for four years. Matthews made the USILA All-American team his junior and senior seasons. He was a USILA 2nd team All American at attack in both 2011 and 2012.

With Matthews leading the team in scoring, the Denver Pioneers surprised the lacrosse world by reaching the 2011 NCAA lacrosse semi-finals.

== Canadian Lacrosse Association career ==
Matthews played for the OLA Jr A Whitby Warriors for three years, winning a Minto Cup in 2011. In 2010 he played for the Coquitlam Adanacs, where he won his first Minto Cup. Matthews currently plays for the Peterborough Lakers in the Major Series Lacrosse league.

== NLL career ==
Matthews was drafted by the Edmonton Rush in the first round of the 2012 NLL Entry Draft. After scoring 38 goals and 31 assists in his rookie year, Matthews was named NLL Rookie of the Year. The Rush won their first championship on June 5, 2015, and Matthews was named MVP of the championship finals. In 2018, Matthews won the National Lacrosse League MVP Award after a year where he broke the league record for assists in a season with 84.

Heading into the 2023 NLL season, Inside Lacrosse ranked Matthews the #10 best forward in the NLL.

Matthews was traded from the Rush to the Toronto Rock on July 10, 2023 in exchange for forward Zach Manns, defenseman Adam Jay, and the 12th overall pick in the 2023 NLL Entry Draft.

== MLL career ==
Matthews was drafted in the first round of the 2012 Major League Lacrosse draft by the Denver Outlaws, where he scored 19 goals in 9 games. In 2013, he joined the New York Lizards, where he had 11 goals in 8 games. He switched teams again for the 2014 season, this time to the Rochester Rattlers. In his two years there, he played in 8 games and scored 17 goals. In 2016, for the Atlanta Blaze, Matthews has his career high goals with 23. He stayed with the Blaze for the 2017 season, where he had 13 goals in 6 games. In 2018, Matthews joined the Ohio Machine, but only participated in 2 games for them.

== Personal ==
Outside of lacrosse, Matthews works as a real estate agent in the Durham region.

== Statistics ==
=== University of Denver ===
Season	GP	G	A	Pts	PPG
2009	15	24	9	33	2.2
2010	16	39	11	50	2.9
2011	14	46	24	70	5.0
2012	16	47	17	64	4.0
Totals	61	156	61	217 (a)	3.6

^{(a)} graduated as all-time career points leader at University of Denver

=== NLL ===
Mark Matthews		Regular season									Playoffs								
Season	Team	GP	G	A	Pts	LB	PIM	Pts/GP	LB/GP	PIM/GP	GP	G	A	Pts	LB	PIM	Pts/GP	LB/GP	PIM/GP
2013	Edmonton Rush	16	38	31	69	47	12	4.31	2.94	0.75	1	2	2	4	2	0	4.00	2.00	0.00
2014	Edmonton Rush	18	31	47	78	54	18	4.33	3.00	1.00	2	6	5	11	5	4	5.50	2.50	2.00
2015	Edmonton Rush	18	53	62	115	64	6	6.39	3.56	0.33	4	11	13	24	11	4	6.00	2.75	1.00
2016	Saskatchewan Rush	18	40	69	109	76	23	6.06	4.22	1.28	4	8	14	22	16	2	5.50	4.00	0.50
2017	Saskatchewan Rush	18	40	73	113	61	25	6.28	3.39	1.39	4	7	20	27	17	0	6.75	4.25	0.00
2018	Saskatchewan Rush	18	32	84	116	67	6	6.44	3.72	0.33	4	3	19	22	11	2	5.50	2.75	0.50
2019	Saskatchewan Rush	18	41	64	105	70	8	5.83	3.89	0.44	1	1	3	4	2	0	4.00	2.00	0.00
2020	Saskatchewan Rush	10	13	41	54	37	2	5.40	3.70	0.20	–	–	–	–	–	–	–	–	–
2022	Saskatchewan Rush	18	30	62	92	57	10	5.11	3.17	0.56	–	–	–	–	–	–	–	–	–
2023	Saskatchewan Rush	18	25	73	98	57	10	5.44	3.17	0.56	–	–	–	–	–	–	–	–	–
2024	Toronto Rock	18	31	66	97	62	8	5.39	3.44	0.44	3	3	7	10	8	0	3.33	2.67	0.00
2025	Toronto Rock	4	1	11	12	11	6	3.00	2.75	1.50	–	–	–	–	–	–	–	–	–
2026	Toronto Rock	16	18	53	71	46	2	4.44	2.88	0.13	6	8	13	21	6	0	3.50	1.00	0.00
		208	393	736	1,129	709	136	5.43	3.41	0.65	29	49	96	145	78	12	5.00	2.69	0.41
Career Total:		237	442	832	1,274	787	148	5.38	3.32	0.62									

GP–Games played; G–Goals; A–Assists; Pts–Points; LB–Loose balls; PIM–Penalty minutes; Pts/GP–Points per games played; LB/GP–Loose balls per games played; PIM/GP–Penalty minutes per games played.

=== Major League Lacrosse ===
Season	Team	Regular season											Playoffs										
Season	Team	GP	G	2PG	A	Pts	Sh	GB	Pen	PIM	FOW	FOA	GP	G	2PG	A	Pts	Sh	GB	Pen	PIM	FOW	FOA
2012	Denver Outlaws	9	19	0	9	28	48	9	0	0	0	0	2	3	0	5	8	15	1	0	5	0	0
2013	New York Lizards	8	11	0	6	17	28	9	0	1	0	0	–	–	–	–	–	–	–	–	–	–	–
2014	Rochester Rattlers	3	6	0	2	8	19	9	0	0	0	0	–	–	–	–	–	–	–	–	–	–	–
2015	Rochester Rattlers	5	11	0	4	15	33	7	0	2	0	0	2	5	0	1	6	17	2	0	0	0	0
2016	Atlanta Blaze	7	23	0	5	28	50	14	0	2	0	0	–	–	–	–	–	–	–	–	–	–	–
2017	Atlanta Blaze	6	13	0	7	20	34	6	0	1	0	0	–	–	–	–	–	–	–	–	–	–	–
2018	Ohio Machine	2	3	0	1	4	12	0	0	2	0	0	–	–	–	–	–	–	–	–	–	–	–
2019	New York Lizards	3	4	0	3	7	16	5	0	1	0	0	–	–	–	–	–	–	–	–	–	–	–
2019	Atlanta Blaze	4	4	0	12	16	20	3	0	0	0	0	–	–	–	–	–	–	–	–	–	–	–
2020	Philadelphia Barrage	5	6	0	5	11	12	6	0	1	0	0	–	–	–	–	–	–	–	–	–	–	–
		52	100	0	54	154	272	68	0	10	0	0	4	8	0	6	14	32	3	0	5	0	0
Career total:		56	108	0	60	168	304	71	0	15	0	0											

GP–Games played; G–Goals; 2PG–2-point goals; A–Assists; Pts–Points; Sh–Shots; GB–Ground balls; Pen–Penalties; PIM–Penalty minutes; FOW–Faceoffs won; FOA–Faceoffs attempted

=== Canadian Lacrosse Association ===
			Regular Season					Playoffs
Season	Team	League	GP	G	A	Pts	PIM	GP	G	A	Pts	PIM
2008	Whitby Warriors	OLA Jr A	20	28	36	64	10	--	--	--	--	--
2009	Whitby Warriors	OLA Jr A	12	20	32	52	--	--	--	--	--	--
2011	Whitby Warriors	OLA Jr A	13	34	39	73	6	--	--	--	--	--
Junior A Totals			--	--	--	--	--	--	--	--	--	--
Senior A Totals			--	--	--	--	--	--	--	--	--	--

== Accomplishments ==
- 2010 Minto Cup Champion (Coquitlam Adanacs)
- 2011 Minto Cup Champion (Whitby Warriors)
- 2015 NLL Champions Cup (Edmonton Rush)
- 2016 NLL Champions Cup (Saskatchewan Rush)
- 2018 NLL Cup (Saskatchewan Rush)
- 2018 NLL MVP (Saskatchewan Rush)
- 2026 NLL Cup (Toronto Rock)

== Awards ==
Preceded by Adam Jones	NLL Rookie of the Year; 2013	Succeeded by Logan Schuss
Preceded by Dan Dawson	Champion's Cup MVP; 2015	Succeeded by Aaron Bold
Preceded by Lyle Thompson	National Lacrosse League MVP Award; 2018	Succeeded by Dane Dobbie

== See also ==
- Denver Pioneers men's lacrosse
- 2011 NCAA Division I Men's Lacrosse Championship
