= Jordan Hall (lacrosse) =

Canadian lacrosse player

Personal information
- Nationality: Canadian
- Born: August 31, 1984 (age 41) Surrey, British Columbia, Canada
- Height: 6 ft 0 in (183 cm)
- Weight: 185 lb (84 kg; 13 st 3 lb)

Sport
- Position: Midfield
- Shoots: Left
- NCAA team: Delaware (2007)
- NLL draft: 1st overall, 2007; New York Titans
- NLL team Former teams: Georgia Swarm; Philadelphia Wings; New England Black Wolves; Philadelphia Wings; Rochester Knighthawks; Orlando Titans; New York Titans
- MLL team Former teams: Hamilton Nationals; Rochester Rattlers; Chicago Machine
- WLA team: New Westminster Salmonbellies
- Pro career: 2007–2022

Jordan Rhys Hall (born August 31, 1984) is a Canadian lacrosse player who plays for the Rochester Knighthawks of the National Lacrosse League (NLL) and the Hamilton Nationals of Major League Lacrosse (MLL).

== College career ==
Hall attended University of Delaware, where he played alongside Alex Smith to help the Blue Hens reach the 2007 NCAA Division I Men's Final Four. In 2006, he was named Colonial Athletic Association Player of the Year.

== Professional career ==
Hall was selected in the first round (first overall) by the New York Titans of the National Lacrosse League in the 2007 NLL Entry Draft. A lacrosse scout said that Hall was "the most NLL-ready player in the draft". Hall was awarded "Rookie of the Month" honors in March of the 2008 NLL season. Hall also joined the Rochester Rattlers of Major League Lacrosse midseason from Chicago, helping the team to its first MLL title in 2008.

During the 2009 NLL season, he was named a reserve to the All-Star game.

Hall played two years in New York and moved with the team to Orlando, where he played one more year before the team disbanded. Hall was picked up by the Rochester Knighthawks in the dispersal draft. After two years in Rochester, Hall was traded to the Philadelphia Wings as part of a blockbuster deal involving Paul Rabil and Dan Dawson. Two years later Hall would find himself back with the Rochester Knighthawks when the newly named New England Black Wolves traded him to Rochester for the 11th and 28th overall picks in 2014, as well as a 2015 1st round pick.

Hall also plays summer box lacrosse in his native British Columbia with the New Westminster Salmonbellies of the Western Lacrosse Association. In 2006, he was named the winner of the league's Ed Bailey Trophy as the year's top rookie.

== Statistics ==
=== University of Delaware ===
Season	GP	G	A	Pts	PPG
2004	16	13	6	19	2.06
2005	17	29	18	47	2.41
2006	16	17	20	37	3.50
2007	17	26	12	38	3.18
Totals	66	85	56	141	2.79

=== MLL ===
		Regular Season						Playoffs
Season	Team	GP	G	A	Pts	GB	PIM	GP	G	A	Pts	GB	PIM
2007	Chicago	6	1	4	5	6	5	0	0	0	0	0	0
2008	Rochester	11	9	5	14	18	2	2	1	4	0	2	0
2009	Toronto	10	9	7	16	32	2	2	0	1	1	2	0
MLL Totals		27	19	16	35	52	9	4	3	2	5	4	0

=== NLL ===
		Regular Season						Playoffs
Season	Team	GP	G	A	Pts	LB	PIM	GP	G	A	Pts	LB	PIM
2008	New York	16	24	45	69	109	18	2	0	3	3	10	2
2009	New York	16	25	56	81	97	12	3	2	6	8	22	4
2010	Orlando	15	16	58	74	67	12	2	1	4	5	13	2
2011	Rochester	12	18	22	40	58	2	1	2	3	5	5	0
2012	Rochester	10	7	24	31	61	11	0	0	0	0	0	0
2013	Philadelphia	15	14	28	42	78	12	1	0	1	1	4	0
2014	Philadelphia	16	34	42	76	95	12	0	0	0	0	0	0
2015	Rochester	18	25	39	64	72	2	4	4	7	11	17	2
2016	Rochester	4	4	4	8	24	4	-	-	-	-	-	-
2016	New England	13	18	33	51	77	6	3	1	11	12	25	2
2017	Georgia	18	20	60	80	70	10	4	12	6	18	18	0
2018	Georgia	10	14	18	32	38	21	1	0	1	1	2	0
2019	Philadelphia	18	19	48	67	92	10	-	-	-	-	-	-
2020	Georgia	11	10	37	47	62	4	-	-	-	-	-	-
2022	Georgia	18	16	35	51	67	17	-	-	-	-	-	-
NLL totals		210	264	549	813	1067	153	21	22	42	64	116	12

== Awards ==
Preceded by Shawn Williams	NLL Sportsmanship Award; 2011	Succeeded by Johnny Powless
Preceded by Ben McIntosh	NLL Sportsmanship Award; 2017	Succeeded by incumbent

== See also ==
- University of Delaware Mens Lacrosse
