= Randy Staats =

Canadian lacrosse player (born 1992)

Personal information
- Nationality: Haudenosaunee
- Born: November 23, 1992 (age 33) Six Nations, Ontario, Canada
- Height: 6 ft 2 in (188 cm)
- Weight: 200 lb (91 kg; 14 st 4 lb)

Sport
- Position: Attack
- Shoots: Right
- NCAA team: Onondaga Community College; Syracuse University (2015)
- NLL draft: 6th overall, 2015; Georgia Swarm
- NLL team Former teams: Halifax Thunderbirds; Georgia Swarm
- MLL draft: 29th overall, 2015; Rochester Rattlers
- MLL teams: Rochester/Dallas Rattlers; Atlanta Blaze; Boston Cannons
- Pro career: 2015–

Career highlights
- NLL: Rookie of the Year (2016); 1x Champion (2017); MLL: 1x Champion (2020); 2x All-Star (2016, 2019); NCAA: Honorable mention All-American (2015); International: All-World Team (2019, 2024)
Medal record
Representing Haudenosaunee
Men's lacrosse
World Lacrosse Championship
Third place	2014 Denver
Third place	2018 Netanya
Third place	2023 San Diego
World Indoor Lacrosse Championship/World Lacrosse Box Championships
Runner-up	2015 Onondaga
Runner-up	2019 Langley
Third place	2024 Utica

Randy Staats (born November 23, 1992) is a Haudenosaunee professional lacrosse player with the Halifax Thunderbirds in the National Lacrosse League (NLL) and the Six Nations Chiefs of the Major Series Lacrosse (MSL). He was drafted 6th overall by the Georgia Swarm in the 2015 NLL Entry Draft. He also played in the Premier Lacrosse League (PLL) and Major League Lacrosse (MLL), drafted 29th overall in the 2015 MLL Entry Draft.

== Early career and education ==
After attending McKinnon Park Secondary School, Randy Staats began his collegiate lacrosse career at Onondaga Community College (OCC), where he was a standout player. In the two seasons he played for OCC, the team went undefeated and won the NJCAA national championship both years. He joined the Syracuse Orange in 2014 after his two years at OCC. At Syracuse, he earned USILA Honorable Mention All-American, Inside Lacrosse Preseason Second Team All-American, and ACC All-Tournament Team honors.

== Professional career ==
Drafted 6th overall by the Georgia Swarm in the 2015 NLL Entry Draft, Staats quickly established himself as a key player. He made a significant impact in his rookie season, earning the 2016 NLL Rookie of the Year award after producing 95 points, setting a rookie point record at the time. Throughout his career, Staats has played for several teams, including the Swarm, Panther City Lacrosse Club, and most recently, the Halifax Thunderbirds

In the MLL, Staats was a two-time All-Star (2016, 2019) and won the 2020 championship with the Cannons.

He is the brother of fellow professional lacrosse player Austin Staats and cousin of Cody Jamieson.

== Personal life and advocacy ==
Staats is also a prominent figure in promoting the sport, especially among Indigenous communities. He has been an advocate of the inclusion of the Haudenosaunee, who lack International Olympic Committee recognition, in the 2028 Olympics.

== Statistics ==
Randy Staats		Regular season									Playoffs								
Season	Team	GP	G	A	Pts	LB	PIM	Pts/GP	LB/GP	PIM/GP	GP	G	A	Pts	LB	PIM	Pts/GP	LB/GP	PIM/GP
2016	Georgia Swarm	18	36	59	95	84	22	5.28	4.67	1.22	1	2	3	5	1	2	5.00	1.00	2.00
2017	Georgia Swarm	13	31	45	76	67	17	5.85	5.15	1.31	4	9	13	22	20	4	5.50	5.00	1.00
2018	Georgia Swarm	16	30	39	69	57	13	4.31	3.56	0.81	1	2	3	5	3	0	5.00	3.00	0.00
2019	Georgia Swarm	17	37	59	96	45	12	5.65	2.65	0.71	1	3	3	6	0	0	6.00	0.00	0.00
2020	Georgia Swarm	12	22	48	70	63	17	5.83	5.25	1.42	–	–	–	–	–	–	–	–	–
2023	Halifax Thunderbirds	17	34	59	93	65	20	5.47	3.82	1.18	1	3	0	3	6	2	3.00	6.00	2.00
2024	Halifax Thunderbirds	9	23	24	47	27	4	5.22	3.00	0.44	1	0	2	2	1	0	2.00	1.00	0.00
		102	213	333	546	408	105	5.35	4.00	1.03	9	19	24	43	31	8	4.78	3.44	0.89
Career Total:		111	232	357	589	439	113	5.31	3.95	1.02									

GP–Games played; G–Goals; A–Assists; Pts–Points; LB–Loose balls; PIM–Penalty minutes; Pts/GP–Points per games played; LB/GP–Loose balls per games played; PIM/GP–Penalty minutes per games played.

=== MLL ===
Season	Team	Regular season											Playoffs										
Season	Team	GP	G	2PG	A	Pts	Sh	GB	Pen	PIM	FOW	FOA	GP	G	2PG	A	Pts	Sh	GB	Pen	PIM	FOW	FOA
2015	Rochester Rattlers	5	7	0	2	9	17	1	0	0	0	0	2	3	0	2	5	6	2	0	0	0	0
2016	Atlanta Blaze	11	30	1	15	46	83	22	0	2	0	0	–	–	–	–	–	–	–	–	–	–	–
2017	Atlanta Blaze	7	16	0	8	24	45	3	0	2	0	0	–	–	–	–	–	–	–	–	–	–	–
2018	Dallas Rattlers	2	6	0	1	7	11	1	0	0	0	0	2	5	0	2	7	13	3	0	1	0	0
2019	Atlanta Blaze	11	17	0	33	50	82	14	3	7	0	0	1	2	0	2	4	7	0	0	0	0	0
2020	Boston Cannons	5	3	0	10	13	29	5	0	0	0	0	–	–	–	–	–	–	–	–	–	–	–
		41	79	1	69	149	267	46	3	11	0	0	5	10	0	6	16	26	5	0	1	0	0
Career total:		46	89	1	75	165	293	51	3	12	0	0											

GP–Games played; G–Goals; 2PG–2-point goals; A–Assists; Pts–Points; Sh–Shots; GB–Ground balls; Pen–Penalties; PIM–Penalty minutes; FOW–Faceoffs won; FOA–Faceoffs attempted

=== NCAA ===
Season	Team	GP	GS	G	A	Pts	Sh	GB	CT
2014	Syracuse	14	9	33	23	56	70	15	4
2015	Syracuse	13	13	29	24	53	75	19	3
Career	Syracuse	27	22	62	47	109	145	34	7
