= Shayne Jackson =

Canadian lacrosse player (born 1990)

Personal information
- Nationality: Canadian
- Born: November 16, 1990 (age 36) Bowmanville, Ontario, Canada
- Height: 5 ft 9 in (175 cm)
- Weight: 180 lb (82 kg; 12 st 12 lb)

Sport
- Position: Forward
- Shoots: Left
- NCAA team: Limestone (2012)
- NLL draft: 4th overall, 2012; Minnesota Swarm
- NLL team Former teams: Georgia Swarm; Minnesota Swarm
- MLL draft: 62nd overall, 2012; Denver Outlaws
- MLL teams: Charlotte Hounds; Atlanta Blaze; Philadelphia Barrage
- PLL team: Cannons LC
- Pro career: 2013–

Career highlights
- NLL: MVP (2020)
Medal record
Representing Canada
Men's box lacrosse
World Lacrosse Box Championships
Winner	2024 Utica

Shayne Jackson is a Canadian professional lacrosse player playing for the Georgia Swarm of the National Lacrosse League (NLL) and Cannons LC of the Premier Lacrosse League (PLL). He previously played for the Charlotte Hounds, Atlanta Blaze & Philadelphia Barrage in the Major League Lacrosse (MLL).

Drafted fourth overall in 2012 NLL Entry Draft by the Minnesota Swarm, he has played his entire NLL career with the Swarm franchise. He was named the National Lacrosse League MVP Award winner of the pandemic shortened 2020 NLL season.

For college, Jackson started out playing for Onondaga Community College. With them, he won two NJCAA national titles and was the 2010 NJCAA player of the year. He followed that with two years at Limestone College.

== Statistics ==
=== NLL ===
Shayne Jackson		Regular season									Playoffs								
Season	Team	GP	G	A	Pts	LB	PIM	Pts/GP	LB/GP	PIM/GP	GP	G	A	Pts	LB	PIM	Pts/GP	LB/GP	PIM/GP
2013	Minnesota Swarm	16	24	39	63	54	11	3.94	3.38	0.69	2	5	3	8	6	4	4.00	3.00	2.00
2014	Minnesota Swarm	18	18	33	51	56	9	2.83	3.11	0.50	–	–	–	–	–	–	–	–	–
2015	Minnesota Swarm	18	30	48	78	77	12	4.33	4.28	0.67	–	–	–	–	–	–	–	–	–
2016	Georgia Swarm	18	40	43	83	75	20	4.61	4.17	1.11	1	1	2	3	5	0	3.00	5.00	0.00
2016	Georgia Swarm	18	39	45	84	75	8	4.67	4.17	0.44	4	8	14	22	14	0	5.50	3.50	0.00
2018	Georgia Swarm	18	33	52	85	75	9	4.72	4.17	0.50	1	1	5	6	3	0	6.00	3.00	0.00
2019	Georgia Swarm	18	31	49	80	69	13	4.44	3.83	0.72	1	2	6	8	0	0	8.00	0.00	0.00
2020	Georgia Swarm	12	31	42	73	63	8	6.08	5.25	0.67	–	–	–	–	–	–	–	–	–
2022	Georgia Swarm	17	36	41	77	55	6	4.53	3.24	0.35	–	–	–	–	–	–	–	–	–
2023	Georgia Swarm	18	33	60	93	70	18	5.17	3.89	1.00	–	–	–	–	–	–	–	–	–
		171	315	452	767	669	114	4.49	3.91	0.67	9	17	30	47	28	4	5.22	3.11	0.44
Career Total:		180	332	482	814	697	118	4.52	3.87	0.66									

GP–Games played; G–Goals; A–Assists; Pts–Points; LB–Loose balls; PIM–Penalty minutes; Pts/GP–Points per games played; LB/GP–Loose balls per games played; PIM/GP–Penalty minutes per games played.

=== MLL ===
Season	Team	Regular season											Playoffs										
Season	Team	GP	G	2PG	A	Pts	Sh	GB	Pen	PIM	FOW	FOA	GP	G	2PG	A	Pts	Sh	GB	Pen	PIM	FOW	FOA
2013	Charlotte Hounds	1	1	0	0	1	5	1	0	0	0	0	–	–	–	–	–	–	–	–	–	–	–
2016	Atlanta Blaze	3	2	0	1	3	9	2	0	0	0	0	–	–	–	–	–	–	–	–	–	–	–
2019	Atlanta Blaze	15	43	0	15	58	89	14	1	1	0	0	1	0	0	1	1	3	0	0	0	0	0
2020	Philadelphia Barrage	5	9	0	3	12	22	10	0	0	0	0	–	–	–	–	–	–	–	–	–	–	–
		24	55	0	19	74	125	27	1	1	0	0	1	0	0	1	1	3	0	0	0	0	0
Career total:		25	55	0	20	75	128	27	1	1	0	0											

GP–Games played; G–Goals; 2PG–2-point goals; A–Assists; Pts–Points; Sh–Shots; GB–Ground balls; Pen–Penalties; PIM–Penalty minutes; FOW–Faceoffs won; FOA–Faceoffs attempted

=== PLL ===
Season	Team	Regular season											Playoffs										
Season	Team	GP	G	2PG	A	Pts	Sh	GB	Pen	PIM	FOW	FOA	GP	G	2PG	A	Pts	Sh	GB	Pen	PIM	FOW	FOA
2021	Cannons LC	5	10	0	3	13	27	6	0	0	0	0	–	–	–	–	–	–	–	–	–	–	–
2022	Cannons LC	3	3	0	1	4	18	2	1	0.5	0	0	–	–	–	–	–	–	–	–	–	–	–
		8	13	0	4	17	45	8	1	0.5	0	0	0	0	0	0	0	0	0	0	0	0	0
Career total:		8	13	0	4	17	45	8	1	0.5	0	0											

GP–Games played; G–Goals; 2PG–2-point goals; A–Assists; Pts–Points; Sh–Shots; GB–Ground balls; Pen–Penalties; PIM–Penalty minutes; FOW–Faceoffs won; FOA–Faceoffs attempted

== Awards and achievements ==
Preceded by Dane Dobbie	NLL Most Valuable Player; 2020	Succeeded by Dhane Smith
