= City Centre Arena and Cultural Event Centre =

The City Centre Arena and Cultural Event Centre is a future 10,000 seat arena in Surrey, British Columbia with a planned opening in 2030. It will be the home of the Vancouver Giants of the Western Hockey League.

It will be located across the street from the Surrey City Hall and Surrey Central SkyTrain station. Around the arena will be an entertainment district with a hotel, conference space, and housing.
