= Logan Schuss =

Canadian professional lacrosse player

Personal information
- Born: January 23, 1991 (age 35) Delta, British Columbia

Sport
- NCAA team: Ohio State University
- NLL draft: 1st Overall, 2013; Minnesota Swarm
- NLL team: Calgary Roughnecks

Logan Schuss (born January 23, 1991) is a Canadian professional box lacrosse player with the Calgary Roughnecks. He previously played with the Vancouver Warriors, Vancouver Stealth, and Minnesota Swarm. He was the 1st overall pick in the 2013 National Lacrosse League Draft.

== Early career and education ==
Schuss grew up in Delta, BC, and played for the Delta Islanders in his youth. He later attended Ohio State University. During his collegiate career, Schuss earned numerous accolades, including being a three-time NCAA All-American and the 2010 ECAC Rookie of the Year.

== Professional career ==
Logan Schuss was drafted first overall in the 2013 NLL Draft by the Minnesota Swarm, where he quickly established himself by leading all rookies in scoring in his debut season and earning the NLL Rookie of the Year award in 2014. Throughout his career, he has played for the Vancouver Stealth, Vancouver Warriors, and most recently, the Calgary Roughnecks in the NLL. In the WLA, Schuss has been a key player for the New Westminster Salmonbellies, where he led the league in scoring in 2018.

Career Statistics (2015–Present)
Year	Team	GP	G	A	PTS	PPG	PIM	LB	TO	FT	FOW	FOA
2019	Vancouver Warriors	17	24	48	72	4.24	8	74	43	3	0	1
2020	Vancouver Warriors	10	14	12	26	2.6	7	52	22	4	0	0
2022	Vancouver Warriors	16	19	51	70	4.38	8	76	24	6	0	0
2023	Vancouver Warriors	7	8	7	15	2.14	-	25	10	1	-	-
2015	Vancouver Stealth	7	8	26	34	4.86	2	23	20	2	0	0
2016	Vancouver Stealth	15	29	57	86	5.73	15	82	52	2	0	0
2017	Vancouver Stealth	17	35	41	76	4.47	20	85	51	4	0	0
2018	Vancouver Stealth	15	26	36	62	4.13	4	65	43	7	0	0
2014	Minnesota	18	36	37	73	4.06	9	77	40	4	0	0
2015	Minnesota	9	14	18	32	3.56	6	44	24	1	0	0
Total		131	213	333	546	4.17	79	603	329	34	0	1

== Recent activities and coaching ==
In 2023, Schuss took on a coaching role with the New Westminster Salmonbellies while recovering from an ACL surgery. He serves as the team's offensive coach, bringing his expertise and experience to the sidelines. Schuss is also involved with Fusion West Lacrosse as the Box Lacrosse Director and Offensive Coordinator, working with young athletes to develop their skills.
