= Adam Jones (lacrosse) =

Canadian lacrosse player (born 1989)

Personal information
- Nationality: Canadian
- Born: July 31, 1989 (age 37) Owen Sound, Ontario
- Height: 5 ft 9 in (175 cm)
- Weight: 200 lb (91 kg; 14 st 4 lb)

Sport
- Position: Forward
- Shoots: Left
- NLL draft: 3rd overall, 2011; Colorado Mammoth
- NLL team Former teams: Toronto Rock; Saskatchewan Rush; Colorado Mammoth
- WLA team: Langley Thunder
- Pro career: 2012–

Adam Jones (born July 31, 1989) is a Canadian professional lacrosse player who plays for the Toronto Rock in the National Lacrosse League. Jones is also a member of Owen Sound Northstars in the Ontario Senior B lacrosse league and the Langley Thunder in the Western Lacrosse Association (WLA). In 2013 he was named the sixteenth best indoor lacrosse player in the world by Ilindoor magazine.

== Box Lacrosse career ==
Jones began his lacrosse career in Owen Sound. He starred for the Owen Sound Rams in Junior B where he led the league in scoring in 2006 with 94 points in 20 games. He moved on to the Junior A Orangeville Northmen in 2010. Jones helped the Northmen win two Minto Cups and was named Most Outstanding Player in the tournament in 2009. He was selected in the first round, third overall, by the Colorado Mammoth in the 2011 NLL draft. and in the first round, second overall, by the Brooklin Redmen in the 2012 MSL draft. Jones won NLL rookie of the year honors in 2012 leading all rookies with 76 points on 29 goals and 47 assists. He is also a member of the Peterborough Lakers in the MSL. On September 19, 2016 Jones was traded from the Colorado Mammoth along with a second round draft pick in 2017 to the Saskatchewan Rush for Zach Greer and a 1st round pick in 2016 (9th overall pick). On July 25, 2017, he was traded to the Toronto Rock in exchange for a 1st round pick in each of the 2018 and 2019 NLL Drafts.

== Field Lacrosse career ==
Jones starred for Team Canada at the World U-19 Field Lacrosse Championships in 2008. He was named tournament MVP and top Midfielder. He played for Canisius College Golden Griffins in the NCAA from 2008 until he graduated in 2011 and was named an All American in his freshman season. He was drafted 38th overall in the 2011 MLL draft by the Rochester Rattlers. Jones was a member of the Canadian National Team which won gold at the 2014 World Field Lacrosse Championships.

== Statistics ==
=== NLL ===
Adam Jones		Regular season									Playoffs								
Season	Team	GP	G	A	Pts	LB	PIM	Pts/GP	LB/GP	PIM/GP	GP	G	A	Pts	LB	PIM	Pts/GP	LB/GP	PIM/GP
2012	Colorado Mammoth	16	29	47	76	77	8	4.75	4.81	0.50	1	3	0	3	6	0	3.00	6.00	0.00
2013	Colorado Mammoth	16	33	39	72	87	19	4.50	5.44	1.19	1	4	1	5	2	0	5.00	2.00	0.00
2014	Colorado Mammoth	13	39	26	65	65	6	5.00	5.00	0.46	1	5	0	5	0	2	5.00	0.00	2.00
2015	Colorado Mammoth	16	51	42	93	73	16	5.81	4.56	1.00	1	0	0	0	6	2	0.00	6.00	2.00
2016	Colorado Mammoth	14	42	26	68	63	11	4.86	4.50	0.79	1	4	0	4	9	0	4.00	9.00	0.00
2017	Saskatchewan Rush	16	26	31	57	75	8	3.56	4.69	0.50	4	13	6	19	21	0	4.75	5.25	0.00
2018	Toronto Rock	18	37	52	89	109	9	4.94	6.06	0.50	–	–	–	–	–	–	–	–	–
2019	Toronto Rock	12	25	31	56	63	2	4.67	5.25	0.17	2	7	9	16	5	2	8.00	2.50	1.00
2020	Toronto Rock	1	1	0	1	4	2	1.00	4.00	2.00	–	–	–	–	–	–	–	–	–
		122	283	294	577	616	81	4.73	5.05	0.66	11	36	16	52	49	6	4.73	4.45	0.55
Career Total:		133	319	310	629	665	87	4.73	5.00	0.65									

GP–Games played; G–Goals; A–Assists; Pts–Points; LB–Loose balls; PIM–Penalty minutes; Pts/GP–Points per games played; LB/GP–Loose balls per games played; PIM/GP–Penalty minutes per games played.
