= Langley Events Centre =

Multipurpose venue in Langley, British Columbia

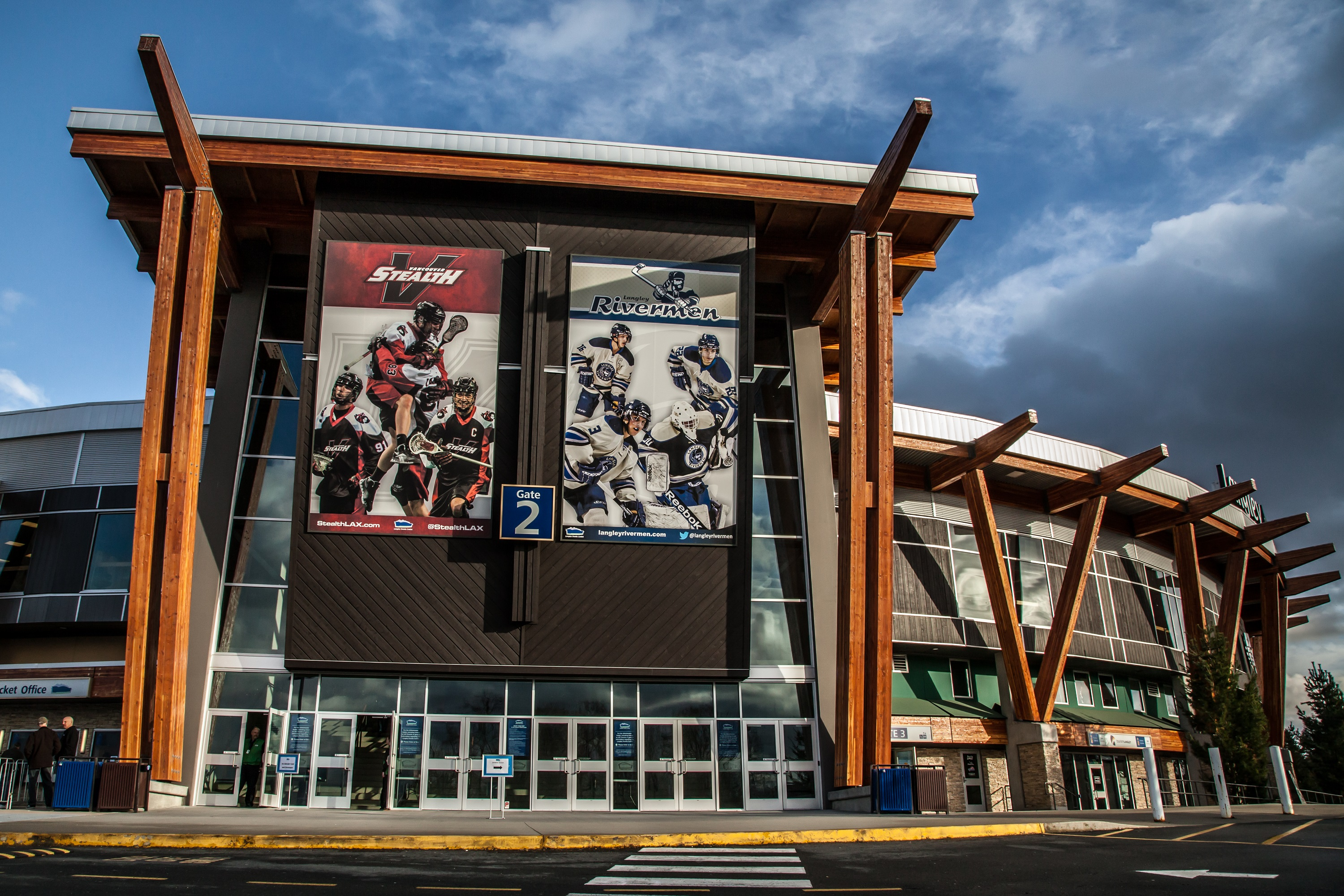
- Interactive map of Langley Events Centre
- Location: 7888 200th Street; Langley, British Columbia; V2Y 3J4
- Coordinates: 49°8′45″N 122°39′58″W
- Owner: Township of Langley
- Capacity: Arena: 5,276; Field House: 520; Centre Gymnasium: 2,200; South Gymnasium: 1,000

Construction
- Opened: April 1, 2009
- Cost: CA$56 million

Tenants
- Langley Chiefs/Rivermen (BCHL) (2009–2016); Trinity Western Spartans (U Sports) (2009–present); Langley Thunder (WLA) (2009–present); Langley Thunder (BCJALL) (2009–present); BC Titans (IBL) (2009–2010); Vancouver Stealth (NLL) (2013–2018); Vancouver Giants (WHL) (2016–present); Vancouver Bandits (CEBL) (2022–present)

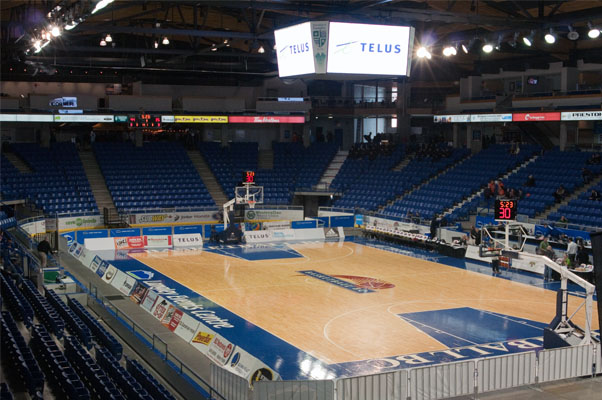
Langley Events Centre before the 2011 BC Boys AAA High School Basketball Championship

The Langley Events Centre is a 322,312-square-foot (29,943.8 m^{2}) multipurpose facility in the Township of Langley, British Columbia, Canada. The LEC debuted in April 2009, hosting the 2009 BC Gymnastics Championships. It boasts an arena bowl with a 5,276 capacity for sports, including 24 individual suites. The LEC also showcases a triple Gymnasium with a capacity of 2,200 spectators under its centre court configuration. The venue's second building, the Fieldhouse at Langley Events Centre, houses a dry floor arena, as well as a double gymnasium with a capacity of 1,100 spectators. Other highlights of the facility include a Banquet Hall with an 800-person capacity, an indoor walking surface, meeting rooms, an outdoor playground and various grass and turf fields. The LEC is home to the Langley Gymnastics Foundation, a non-profit organization offering gymnastics programming for recreational and competitive athletes.

== History ==
The Langley Events Centre, the largest sports and recreation project in Langley's history to date, opened its doors after more than two years of construction. Plans were unveiled on December 18, 2006, for what was then a $45 million multi-use facility. Costs ultimately rose to $56 million, partially funded by the Township, the province, and private builders. The first event hosted at the LEC was the 2009 BC Gymnastics Championships.

== Teams ==
=== Vancouver Stealth ===
The Washington Stealth of the National Lacrosse League relocated to the LEC on June 27, 2013 to become the Vancouver Stealth. They are the second NLL team to play in Greater Vancouver, following the Vancouver Ravens from 2002 through 2004 at General Motors Place. The Stealth played in Langley from 2013 to 2018, until the team was purchased by Canucks Sports and Entertainment and moved to Rogers Arena in downtown Vancouver. In the following season, the team was rebranded to become the Vancouver Warriors.

=== Langley Rivermen ===
The LEC was home to the Langley Rivermen of the British Columbia Hockey League. The team began play in 2011 after the Langley Chiefs returned to their original home, becoming the Chilliwack Chiefs. In 2016, the Rivermen relocated to the George Preston Recreation Centre, due to the WHL's Vancouver Giants moving from the Pacific Coliseum to the LEC.

=== Langley Thunder ===
The LEC hosts two Langley Thunder lacrosse teams, the Langley Thunder Western Lacrosse Association team and the Langley Thunder BC Junior A Lacrosse League team.

=== Trinity Western University Athletics ===
Five Trinity Western Spartans sports teams play at Langley Events Centre: basketball (men's and women's), volleyball (men's and women's), and hockey (men's and women's). The LEC replaced David E. Enarson Gymnasium as the home of the Spartans.

=== BC Titans ===
The BC Titans of the International Basketball League (IBL) called the LEC home from 2009-2010. Team management opted not to participate in the IBL for the 2011 season.

=== Vancouver Giants ===
The Vancouver Giants of the WHL have started play with the beginning of the 2016–2017 season at the Langley Events Centre. They had previously played at the Pacific Coliseum. They're expected to move to the City Centre Arena and Cultural Event Centre in Surrey in 2030.

=== Vancouver Bandits ===
On September 23, 2021, the Fraser Valley Bandits announced that the club had chosen Langley Events Centre (LEC) as its home for the upcoming Canadian Elite Basketball League (CEBL) season, which began in May 2022.

=== Vancouver FC ===
On April 13, 2022, the Canadian Premier League announced that the soccer club Vancouver FC would begin playing at Willoughby Stadium, adjacent to Langley Events Centre.

=== Arena Lacrosse League ===
Since its inception in 2022, the 4 teams of the Western Division of the Arena Lacrosse League have played every game at the LEC Fieldhouse, located just to the north of the main arena. The women's division, which began at the same time, also called the Fieldhouse home. For the upcoming 2026-27 season, both leagues, joined by a new U21 division, have moved their games to the new ARENAS at LEC, although the women's division still plans to play some games at the Fieldhouse.

== Notable events ==
- 2009 BC Artistic Gymnastics Provincial Championships
- 2010 Vancouver/Whistler Winter Olympics Torch Relay Community Celebration site
- 2010 Women’s Hockey Pre-Olympic exhibition game, Russia vs Slovakia
- 2010 Vancouver Giants of the Western Hockey League (WHL), 6 regular season home games
- 2011 NLL Pre-Season (Washington Stealth vs Toronto Rock)
- 2011 Mann Cup (Langley Thunder vs. Brampton Excelsiors)
- 2011 World Junior A Hockey Challenge
- 2012 World Curling Financial Group Continental Cup
- 2012 NLL Pre-Season (Calgary Roughnecks vs Colorado Mammoth)
- 2012 U23 Pan American Men's Volleyball Cup
- 2013 Special Olympics BC Provincial Summer Games Opening Ceremony
- 2013 NORCECA Men's Volleyball Continental Cup
- 2013 NLL Championship Game
- 2014 Vancouver Stealth Franchise Opener
- 2014 Minto Cup (Coquitlam Adanacs vs Six Nations Arrows)
- Eight High School Basketball tournaments are played at the LEC each year, including the 4A Boys Basketball Championships
- 2018 LORDCO Road to the World Junior (Finland vs Denmark, USA vs Czech Republic)
- 2019 BC Compulsory Women's Artistic Gymnastics Championships
- 2019 World Indoor Lacrosse Championship
- 2022 Canadian Ninja League National Finals
- 2022 World Under-17 Hockey Challenge
- 2022 CCAA Men's Soccer National Championship
- 2022-Present Stalew Powwow

== Other notes ==
The LEC is home to a number of groups and organizations, including Tourism Langley and the Langley Sports Medicine Clinic.
