= Vancouver Warriors =

NLL professional box lacrosse team

- Sport: Box lacrosse
- Founded: 2014
- League: National Lacrosse League
- Team history: Albany Attack (2000–2003); San Jose Stealth (2004–2009); Washington Stealth (2010–2013); Vancouver Stealth (2014–2018); Vancouver Warriors (2018–Present)
- Location: Vancouver, British Columbia
- Arena: Rogers Arena
- Colours: Gold, White, Black
- Owner: Canucks Sports & Entertainment
- Head coach: Curt Malawsky
- General manager: Curt Malawsky
- Playoff berths: 3 (2017, 2025, 2026)
- Formerly: Vancouver Stealth; Washington Stealth; San Jose Stealth; Albany Attack
- Website: vancouverwarriors.com

The Vancouver Warriors are a Canadian professional box lacrosse team based in Vancouver, British Columbia, that competes in the National Lacrosse League (NLL). The team moved from Everett, Washington, for the 2014 NLL season.

== History ==
The Warriors are based in Vancouver, British Columbia, and play at Rogers Arena, home of the Vancouver Canucks of the NHL. From the 2014 season to the 2017–18 season the Warriors (then known as the Stealth) played at the Langley Events Centre (LEC) in the Vancouver suburb of Langley, British Columbia. The team officially relocated into the city after being sold in 2018 to Canucks Sports & Entertainment, who announced that they would be rebranding the team. On September 21, 2018, the team unveiled their new logo and announced that their new name would be the Vancouver Warriors.

The franchise began as the Albany Attack which played from 2000 until 2003. The franchise adopted the Stealth nickname upon its move to San Jose in 2004. The team kept the name following their subsequent moves to Everett in 2010 and Vancouver in 2014. The Stealth won the Champion's Cup in 2010 while playing as the Washington Stealth. In 2017, the Vancouver Stealth qualified for the NLL Playoffs for the first time since 2013.

In 2025, the Vancouver qualified for the playoffs for the first time since their 2018 rebrand as the Warriors, and corresponding move to Rogers Arena. After defeating Rochester 15-10 in the quarterfinal, they faced the Buffalo Bandits, who were in the process of their championship 3peat. The Warriors fell 2-0 in the best of 3.

The 2026 Warriors entered the season looking to progress further in the playoffs. They improved their record by 2 wins, finishing 13-5 and earning 1st place. This bought them a match against the 8th place Halifax Thunderbirds. Vancouver dominated the first two quarters, stretching their lead to 7-1 going into halftime. Halifax responded with a spectacular comeback in the second half, as the Warriors completely fell apart and offered no resistance. The Thunderbirds prevailed 10-7 by games end, shocking the box lacrosse world, and beginning a surprise run to the NLL Finals, where they would eventually lose in 2 games to the Toronto Rock.

== Current roster ==
Vancouver Warriors roster
Active (21-man) roster		Inactive roster	Coaches
Goaltenders: 35 (Canada) Christian Del Bianco; 39 (Canada) Connor O'Toole; Defencemen: 2 (Canada) Matt Beers (A); 28 (Canada) Reid Bowering (A); 11 (Canada) Reece Callies; 18 (Canada) Steph Charbonneau; 13 (Canada) Jeff Cornwall; 24 (Canada) Ryan Dilks (A); 15 (Canada) Tyler Garrison; 12 (Canada) Brett Mydske (C); 88 (Canada) Remo Schenato; 37 (Canada) Jackson Suboch; 20 (Canada) Nathan Miller	Forwards: 45 (Canada) Keegan Bal (A); 8 (Canada) Adam Charalambides; 42 (Canada) Payton Cormier; 17 (Canada) Curtis Dickson; 19 (Canada) Jesse King; 14 (Canada) Marcus Klarich; 96 (Canada) Ryan Martel; 91 (Canada) Ryan Sheridan; Transition: 16 (Canada) Owen Grant; 22 (Canada) Shane Simpson; 73 (United States) Alec Stathakis; 74 (Canada) Ethan Ticehurst		Head coach: Curt Malawsky; Assistant coaches: Bob McMahon (offence); Rob Williams (defence); Tyler Richards (player development); Grant Coghill (video); Legend: * Suspended list; (C) Captain; (A) Alternate captain; Roster updated NLL Transactions

== Awards and honours ==
Year	Player	Award
2024	Ryan Dilks	Defensive Player of the Year

=== Hall of Fame members ===
- Chris Hall, Class of 2014

== All-time record ==
Season	Division/Conference (Note: Conference play began in the 2022 season. As of the 2024 season, the teams are no longer separated into conferences.)	W–L	Finish	Home	Road	GF	GA	Coach	Playoffs
2014	Western	4–14	4th	3–6	1–8	181	223	Chris Hall	Did not qualify
2015	Western	5–13	4th	3–6	2–7	211	265	Dan Perreault	Did not qualify
2016	Western	5–13	4th	4–5	1–8	198	245	Dan Perreault	Did not qualify
2017	Western	9–9	2nd	4–5	5–4	218	221	Jamie Batley	Lost in division semi-final
2018	Western	2–16	4th	0–9	2–7	186	277	Chris Gill	Did not qualify
2019	Western	5–13	5th	3–6	2–7	179	221	Chris Gill	Did not qualify
2020	Western	4–9	5th	2–4	2–5	117	160	Chris Gill	No playoffs held
2021	Western	Season cancelled due to COVID-19 pandemic							
2022	Western	6–12	6th	3–6	3–6	199	209	Chris Gill	Did not qualify
2023	Western	4–14	7th	2–7	2–7	188	247	Troy Cordingley	Did not qualify
2024	Unified	8–10	12th	5–4	3–6	202	211	Curt Malawsky	Did not qualify
2025	Unified	11–7	4th	7–2	4–5	196	172	Curt Malawsky	Lost Semifinals
2026	Unified	13–5	1st	6–3	7–2	200	170	Curt Malawsky	Lost Quarterfinals
Total	11 seasons	76–134		42–63	34–71	2,275	2,621		
Playoff totals	3 Appearances	1–4		1–3	0–1	46	53	0 championships	

== Playoff results ==
Season	Game	Visiting	Home
2017	West Division Semifinal	Colorado 13	Vancouver 12
2025	Quarterfinals	Rochester 10	Vancouver 15
2025	Semi Final 1	Vancouver 3	Buffalo 9
2025	Semi Final 2	Buffalo 11	Vancouver 9
2026	Quarterfinals	Halifax 10	Vancouver 7

== Head coaching history ==
Note: This list does not include coaches from the San Jose Stealth or the Washington Stealth or the Albany Attack.

#	Name	Term	Regular season				Playoffs			
#	Name	Term	GC	W	L	W%	GC	W	L	W%
1	Chris Hall	2014	18	4	14	.222	—	—	—	—
2	Dan Perreault	2015–2016	22	8	14	.364	—	—	—	—
3	Jamie Batley	2016–2017	24	10	14	.417	1	0	1	.000
4	Chris Gill	2018–2022	67	17	50	.254	—	—	—	—
5	Troy Cordingley	2023	18	4	14	.222	—	—	—	—
6	Curt Malawsky	2024–	54	32	22	.593	3	1	2	.333

== Draft history ==
=== NLL Entry Draft ===
First Round Selections

- 2013: Cody Bremner (8th overall)
- 2014: None
- 2015: None
- 2016: None
- 2017: None
- 2018: None
- 2019: None
- 2020: Reid Bowering (2nd overall)
- 2021: Adam Charalambides (4th overall)
- 2022: Owen Grant (3rd overall)
- 2023: Payton Cormier (4th overall), Brock Haley (7th overall), Brayden Laity (9th overall), Connor O’Toole (18th overall)
- 2024: Johnathan Peshko (4th overall), Remo Schenato (6th overall)
- 2025: None
- 2026: Matt Collison (3rd overall), Marcus Khan (16th overall)
