= Georgia Swarm =

NLL professional box lacrosse team

- Sport: Box lacrosse
- First season: 2016
- League: National Lacrosse League
- Team history: Montreal Express (2002); Minnesota Swarm (2004–2015)
- Location: Duluth, Georgia
- Arena: Gas South Arena
- Colors: Gold, Navy, White
- Owner: John and Andy Arlotta
- Head coach: Ed Comeau
- General manager: John Arlotta
- Championships: 1 (2017)
- Division titles: 2 (2017, 2018)
- Playoff berths: 6 (2016, 2017, 2018, 2019, 2024, 2025)
- Website: georgiaswarm.com

The Georgia Swarm are an American professional box lacrosse team based in the Atlanta metropolitan area that competes in the National Lacrosse League (NLL). They have been playing at the 13,000-seat Gas South Arena since their 2016 season.

== Team history ==
Originally formed as the 2002 expansion Montreal Express, the owners of the Minnesota Swarm purchased the inactive Express franchise from the NLL to create the Swarm in 2004. They played at the Xcel Energy Center in Saint Paul, Minnesota from 2004 until 2015. On May 22, 2015, team owner John Arlotta announced that the Xcel Energy Center did not renew the contract for the team. Instead of negotiating for a new lease, the Swarm began looking for potential relocation sites and eventually chose the Atlanta metro area.

In 2017 the Swarm won the NLL championship title against the defending Saskatchewan Rush 2–0 in a best of three series.

== Current roster ==
2024 Georgia Swarm season

== Head coaching history ==
Note: This list does not include coaches from the Minnesota Swarm.

#	Name	Term	Regular season				Playoffs			
#	Name	Term	GC	W	L	W%	GC	W	L	W%
1	Ed Comeau	2016-	174	99	75	.569	13	6	7	.462

== Awards and honors ==
Note: This list does not include awards from the Minnesota Swarm Note: Mike Poulin's 2020 Teammate of the year award was a tie with Dan Dawson of the Toronto Rock.

Year	Player	Award
2016	Randy Staats	Rookie of the Year
2017	Lyle Thompson	Most Valuable Player
2017	Lyle Thompson	Championship Game MVP
2017	Jason Noble	Defensive Player of the Year
2017	Jordan Hall	Sportsmanship Award
2017	John Arlotta	GM of the Year
2017	Ed Comeau	Les Bartley Award
2017	Mike Poulin	Teammate of the Year
2018	Lyle Thompson	Sportsmanship Award
2019	Lyle Thompson	Sportsmanship Award
2019	John Ranagan	Teammate of the Year
2020	Shayne Jackson	Most Valuable Player
2020	Lyle Thompson	Sportsmanship Award
2020	Mike Poulin	Teammate of the Year
2022	Lyle Thompson	Sportsmanship Award
2023	Lyle Thompson	Sportsmanship Award
2024	Lyle Thompson	Sportsmanship Award

== All-time record ==
Season	Division/Conference (Note: Conference play began in the 2022 season)	W–L	Finish	Home	Road	GF	GA	Coach	Playoffs
2016	Eastern	8–10	3rd	4–5	4–5	238	240	Ed Comeau	Lost division semi-final
2017	Eastern	13–5	1st	7–2	6–3	266	213	Ed Comeau	Won Championship
2018	Eastern	11–7	1st	6–3	5–4	226	215	Ed Comeau	Lost division final
2019	Eastern	12–6	2nd	7–2	5–4	230	210	Ed Comeau	Lost Eastern Division semi-final
2020	Eastern	7–5	2nd	2–4	5–1	149	126	Ed Comeau	No playoffs held
2021	Eastern	Season cancelled due to COVID-19 pandemic							
2022	Eastern	9–9	6th	4–5	5–4	205	212	Ed Comeau	Did not qualify
2023	Eastern	8–10	6th	3–6	5–4	219	207	Ed Comeau	Did not qualify
2024	Unified	10–8	5th	6–3	4–5	198	197	Ed Comeau	Lost Quarterfinals
2025	Unified	9–9	7th	4–5	5–4	214	217	Ed Comeau	Lost Quarterfinals
2026	Unified	12–6	4th	5–4	7–2	193	156	Ed Comeau	Lost Semifinals
Total	10 seasons	99–75		48–39	51–36	2,138	1,993		
Playoff totals	7 Appearances	6–7		3–3	3–4	166	154	1 Championship	

== Playoff results ==
Season	Game	Visiting	Home
2016	East Division semi-final	Georgia 13	New England 14 OT
2017	East Division Finals Game 1	Georgia 11	Toronto 8
2017	East Division Finals Game 2	Toronto 9	Georgia 13
2017	NLL Finals Game 1	Saskatchewan 14	Georgia 18
2017	NLL Finals Game 2	Georgia 15 OT	Saskatchewan 14
2018	East Division Finals	Rochester 9	Georgia 8
2019	East Division semi-final	Toronto 16	Georgia 14
2024	Quarterfinals	Georgia 9	Buffalo 10 OT
2025	Quarterfinals	Georgia 9	Saskatchewan 13
2026	Quarterfinals	Buffalo 10	Georgia 17
2026	Semi Final 1	Halifax 12	Georgia 7
2026	Semi Final 2	Georgia 21	Halifax 10
2026	Semi Final 3	Halifax 15	Georgia 11

== Draft history ==
=== NLL entry draft ===
First-round selections

- 2015: Lyle Thompson (1st overall), Chad Tutton (5th overall), Randy Staats (6th overall)
- 2016: Bryan Cole (4th overall), Connor Sellars (10th overall)
- 2017: Zed Williams (4th overall)
- 2018: Brendan Bomberry (7th overall), Adam Wiedemann (8th overall)
- 2019: Kason Tarbell (11th overall), Ryan MacSpadyen (13th overall)
- 2020: Robert Hudson (6th overall), Jeff Henrick (8th overall), Ethan Walker (10th overall), Laine Hruska (13th overall)
- 2021: Ryan Lanchbury (2nd overall)
- 2022: Brett Dobson (11th overall), Brady Kearnan (20th overall)
- 2023: Toron Eccleston (6th overall), Jacob Hickey (8th overall), Kaleb Benedict (19th overall)
- 2024: Michael Grace (3rd overall), Alex Bean (11th overall)
- 2025: Ben Trumble (7th overall), Nolan Byrne (8th overall), Jeremi Phoenix-Lefebvre (16th overall)
