= 2016 NLL season =

- League: National Lacrosse League
- Sport: Indoor lacrosse
- Duration: January 1 – June 4, 2016
- Games: 18
- Teams: 9

Draft
- Top draft pick: Lyle Thompson
- Picked by: Georgia Swarm

Regular Season
- Top seed: Buffalo Bandits
- Season MVP: Dhane Smith (Buffalo Bandits)
- Top scorer: Dhane Smith (Buffalo Bandits)

Playoffs
- Finals champions: Saskatchewan Rush (2nd title)
- Runners-up: Buffalo Bandits
- Finals MVP: Aaron Bold (Rush)

NLL seasons
- ← 2015 season 2017 season →

The 2016 National Lacrosse League season, the 30th in the history of the NLL, began on January 1, 2016, and ended with the Champion's Cup Finals series on June 4, 2016. The Saskatchewan Rush won their 2nd straight title; their first while located in Saskatchewan.

== Milestones and events ==
=== Pre-season ===
- May 29, 2015: The Minnesota Swarm announce that they would move to the Arena at Gwinnett Center in Duluth, Georgia as the Georgia Swarm.
- July 20, 2015: The Edmonton Rush announce that they would move to the SaskTel Centre in Saskatoon, Saskatchewan as the Saskatchewan Rush.
- September 2, 2015: Buffalo Bandits forward John Tavares announced his retirement after 24 seasons. Tavares is the career leader in goals, assists, points, and games played. He will remain with the Bandits organization as an assistant coach.

== Teams ==
2016 National Lacrosse League
Division	Team	City	Arena	Capacity
East	Buffalo Bandits	Buffalo, New York	First Niagara Center	19,070
East	Georgia Swarm	Duluth, Georgia	Infinite Energy Arena	10,500
East	New England Black Wolves	Uncasville, Connecticut	Mohegan Sun Arena	7,074
East	Rochester Knighthawks	Rochester, New York	Blue Cross Arena	10,662
East	Toronto Rock	Toronto, Ontario	Air Canada Centre	18,800
West	Calgary Roughnecks	Calgary, Alberta	Scotiabank Saddledome	19,289
West	Colorado Mammoth	Denver, Colorado	Pepsi Center	18,007
West	Saskatchewan Rush	Saskatoon, Saskatchewan	SaskTel Centre	15,195
West	Vancouver Stealth	Langley, British Columbia	Langley Events Centre	5,276

=== Map of teams ===
East Division West Division

== Standings ==
East Division
P	Team	GP	W	L	PCT	GB	Home	Road	GF	GA	Diff	GF/GP	GA/GP
1	Buffalo Bandits – xyz	18	13	5	.722	0.0	8–1	5–4	251	214	+37	13.94	11.89
2	New England Black Wolves – x	18	10	8	.556	3.0	6–3	4–5	229	212	+17	12.72	11.78
3	Georgia Swarm – x	18	8	10	.444	5.0	4–5	4–5	238	240	−2	13.22	13.33
4	Rochester Knighthawks	18	7	11	.389	6.0	3–6	4–5	200	215	−15	11.11	11.94
5	Toronto Rock	18	5	13	.278	8.0	4–5	1–8	190	224	−34	10.56	12.44

West Division
P	Team	GP	W	L	PCT	GB	Home	Road	GF	GA	Diff	GF/GP	GA/GP
1	Saskatchewan Rush – xy	18	13	5	.722	0.0	7–2	6–3	233	190	+43	12.94	10.56
2	Colorado Mammoth – x	18	12	6	.667	1.0	8–1	4–5	203	202	+1	11.28	11.22
3	Calgary Roughnecks – x	18	8	10	.444	5.0	5–4	3–6	216	216	−-0	12.00	12.00
4	Vancouver Stealth	18	5	13	.278	8.0	4–5	1–8	198	245	−47	11.00	13.61

x: Clinched playoff berth; c: Clinched playoff berth by crossing over to another division; y: Clinched division; z: Clinched best regular season record; GP: Games Played
W: Wins; L: Losses; GB: Games back; PCT: Win percentage; Home: Record at Home; Road: Record on the Road; GF: Goals scored; GA: Goals allowed
Differential: Difference between goals scored and allowed; GF/GP: Average number of goals scored per game; GA/GP: Average number of goals allowed per game

== Scoring leaders ==
Note: GP = Games played; G = Goals; A = Assists; Pts = Points; PIM = Penalty minutes; LB = Loose Balls

Player	Team	GP	G	A	Pts	PIM	LB
Dhane Smith	Buffalo Bandits	18	72	65	137	9	111
Shawn Evans	New England Black Wolves	17	50	68	118	39	116
Callum Crawford	Colorado Mammoth	18	32	83	115	15	89
Rob Hellyer	Toronto Rock	18	45	68	113	23	88
Rhys Duch	Vancouver Stealth	18	48	63	111	8	83
Mark Matthews	Saskatchewan Rush	18	40	69	109	23	76
Curtis Dickson	Calgary Roughnecks	18	61	46	107	13	84
Cody Jamieson	Rochester Knighthawks	18	33	61	94	0	83
Dan Dawson	Rochester Knighthawks	18	40	55	95	12	62
Randy Staats	Georgia Swarm	18	36	59	95	22	84

== Leading goaltenders ==
Note: GP = Games played; Mins = Minutes played; W = Wins; L = Losses: GA = Goals Allowed; SV% = Save Percentage; GAA = Goals against average

Player	Team	GP	Mins	W	L	GA	SV%	GAA
Aaron Bold	Saskatchewan Rush	18	1042	12	5	179	0.761	10.30
Dillon Ward	Colorado Mammoth	16	743	7	3	128	0.799	10.33
Nick Rose	Toronto Rock	18	719	5	7	133	0.783	11.10
Mike Poulin	Calgary Roughnecks	17	591	4	5	113	0.778	11.46
Matt Vinc	Rochester Knighthawks	18	890	5	9	172	0.775	12.82

== Playoffs ==
Division semifinals
East Division
E2	New England	14*
E3	Georgia	13
West Division
W2	Colorado	10
W3	Calgary	11*

Division finals (3-game series)
E1	Buffalo	2
E2	New England	0
W1	Saskatchewan	2
W3	Calgary	0

Finals (3-game series)
W1	Saskatchewan	2
E1	Buffalo	0

*Overtime

=== Division semifinals ===
==== (E2) New England Black Wolves vs. (E3) Georgia Swarm ====
May 6, 2016	New England Black Wolves	14–13 OT (3–2, 5–5, 3–5, 2–1, 1–0)	Georgia Swarm	Mohegan Sun Arena; Attendance: 3,266

Game reference

Evan Kirk
Goalies
Brodie MacDonald

Crowley (Hoar) (SH) – 02:28	1–0
Burns (Kirk) – 03:52	2–0
	2–1	10:17 – White (SH)
Hall (Evans, Kyle Buchanan) – 11:12	3–1
	3–2	11:50 – Powless (Matisz, Staats)
Evans (Hall, Saunders) – 21:12	4–2
	4–3	22:59 – M. Thompson (Staats, King) (PP)
	4–4	23:12 – Jackson (MacIntosh)
Kyle Buchanan (Ball, Kirk) – 23:56	5–4
	5–5	24:13 – Staats (White)
Crowley (Saunders, Kevin Buchanan) – 24:52	6–5
	6–6	27:11 – L. Thompson (MacIntosh)
Evans (Saunders) – 27:28	7–6
	7–7	28:57 – Powless (Matisz, Jackson)
Kyle Buchanan – 29:08	8–7
Evans (Hall, Crowley) – 31:31	9–7
Crowley (Kyle Buchanan, Hall) (PP) – 41:16	10–7
	10–8	41:51 – L. Thompson (Jackson, Powless)
Crowley – 42:56	11–8
	11–9	43:11 – L. Thompson (O'Connor)
	11–10	43:42 – M. Thompson (L. Thompson, Tutton)
	11–11	44:37 – Staats (Tutton, Powless)
	11–12	44:59 – King (Staats, L. Thompson)
Kevin Buchanan (Evans, Crowley) – 46:11	12–12
Kevin Buchanan (Hall, Crowley) – 46:44	13–12
	13–13	54:50 – L. Thompson (King) (PP)
Evans (Crowley) (PP) – 60:57	14–13

12 min
Penalties
19 min
52
Shots
66

==== (W2) Colorado Mammoth vs. (W3) Calgary Roughnecks ====
May 7, 2016	Colorado Mammoth	10–11 OT (2–3, 3–2, 1–2, 4–3, 0–1)	Calgary Roughnecks	Pepsi Center; Attendance: 13,116

Game reference

Dillon Ward
Goalies
Mike Poulin
Frankie Scigliano

Noble (Crawford, Grant) (PP) – 03:14	1–0
Wardle (Gajic) – 06:24	2–0
	2–1	09:18 – Digby (O'Connor, Shattler)
	2–2	09:46 – Digby (Dickson, Dobbie)
	2–3	11:59 – Dobbie (Berg, Dickson) (PP)
	2–4	16:02 – Dickson (Dobbie, Berg)
Jones (Mallroy) (PP) – 21:58	3–4
Noble – 22:47	4–4
	4–5	24:29 – Berg (Dobbie)
Noble – 29:36	5–5
	5–6	37:27 – Dickson (Shattler, Poulin) (SH)
Jones (Grant) (PP) – 43:21	6–6
	6–7	43:41 – Dickson (Burton, Shattler) (SH)
Noble (Crawford, Mallroy) – 46:34	7–7
Jones (Noble, Crawford) – 48:14	8–7
	8–8	49:36 – Dickson (Poulin)
	8–9	51:19 – Digby (Berg, Dickson)
Cupido (Gajic) – 51:28	9–9
Jones (Grant, Mallroy) – 51:48	10–9
	10–10	59:35 – Dickson (Shattler)
	10–11	70:17 – Dobbie (Shattler, Dickson)

10 min
Penalties
18 min
67
Shots
58

=== Division Finals (best of three) ===
==== (E1) Buffalo Bandits vs. (E2) New England Black Wolves ====
May 16, 2016	New England Black Wolves	10–15 (3–5, 2–3, 3–3, 2–4)	Buffalo Bandits	Mohegan Sun Arena; Attendance: 3,697

Game reference

Evan Kirk
Tye Belanger
Goalies
Anthony Cosmo

Kevin Buchanan (Kyle Buchanan, Saunders) – 01:45	1–0
Saunders (Crowley) (PP) – 04:32	2–0
Kyle Buchanan (Crowley) – 05:07	3–0
	3–1	06:31 – Benesch (D. Smith) (PP)
	3–2	08:51 – Hill (D. Smith)
	3–3	09:56 – Jones (Benesch)
	3–4	11:32 – D. Smith (Benesch) (PP)
	3–5	13:35 – Hill (Benesch)
Evans (Crowley, Hall) (PP) – 16:05	4–5
	4–6	17:02 – Hill (Weiss)
	4–7	18:09 – D. Smith (Benesch, Culp)
	4–8	21:02 – D. Smith (Malcom)
Saunders (Evans, Kyle Buchanan) (SH) – 27:31	5–8
	5–9	30:33 – Culp (Benesch, Steenhuis)
	5–10	33:33 – Steenhuis (Veltman, Culp)
	5–11	33:53 – D. Smith (Jones)
Burns (PP) – 39:28	6–11
Bucktooth (Manney, Belanger) – 42:47	7–11
Kyle Buchanan – 42:54	8–11
	8–12	51:08 – Hill (Benesch)
Saunders (Evans) – 51:36	9–12
	9–13	52:51 – D. Smith (Culp)
	9–14	53:05 – Benesch (Brownwell, Thorimbert)
Kyle Buchanan (Kevin Buchanan, Hall) – 58:04	10–14
	10–15	58:45 – Benesch (Brownwell, Weiss) (ENG)

38 min
Penalties
32 min
55
Shots
52

May 21, 2016	Buffalo Bandits	20–15 (3–5, 6–4, 5–4, 6–2)	New England Black Wolves	First Niagara Center; Attendance: 14,255

Game reference

Anthony Cosmo
Goalies
Evan Kirk

Thorimbert (Jones) – 00:11	1–0
Steenhuis (D. Smith, Hill) – 02:18	2–0
	2–1	02:58 – Hoar (Kirk)
	2–2	08:38 – Kevin Buchanan (Evans, Kyle Buchanan)
	2–3	09:07 – Crowley (Bucktooth, Kirk)
	2–4	12:03 – Evans (Bucktooth, Reid) (PP)
	2–5	13:52 – Evans (Bucktooth)
Jones (Benesch, Hill) – 12:37	3–5
Malcom (Culp, Benesch) – 15:31	4–5
Steenhuis (PP) – 15:59	5–5
	5–6	16:53 – Saunders (Hall, Kevin Buchanan)
Hill (Steenhuis) (PP) – 19:05	6–6
	6–7	20:39 – Saunders (Evans, Hall) (PP)
	6–8	21:16 – Crowley (Evans, Hall) (PP)
	6–9	22:31 – Suddons (Bucktooth) (SH)
Hill (D. Smith, Brownwell) – 23:56	7–9
Benesch (D. Smith) (PP) – 27:23	8–9
D. Smith (Watt) – 29:05	9–9
Culp (D. Smith) – 35:10	10–9
	10–10	35:40 – Kevin Buchanan (Crowley, Saunders)
D. Smith (Malcom, Steenhuis) – 36:15	11–10
	11–11	38:36 – Burns (Kirk) (SH)
Hill (Benesch, D. Smith) (PP) – 39:14	12–11
	12–12	39:46 – Kevin Buchanan (Crowley, Evans)
D. Smith (Priolo, Weiss) (SH) – 41:48	13–12
	13–13	43:58 – Kevin Buchanan
Malcom – 44:17	14–13
Culp (Brownwell, Cosmo) – 48:04	15–13
	15–14	52:53 – Kevin Buchanan (Hall, Evans)
Benesch (Hill) – 54:29	16–14
Benesch (Weiss, Cosmo) – 55:13	17–14
	17–15	55:53 – Kevin Buchanan (Hall)
Culp (Benesch) – 58:07	18–15
Steenhuis (PS) – 58:52	19–15
Hill (Jones) – 58:57	20–15

28 min
Penalties
21 min
61
Shots
50

Bandits win series 2–0.

==== (W1) Saskatchewan Rush vs. (W3) Calgary Roughnecks ====
May 14, 2016	Calgary Roughnecks	10–16 (3–4, 2–2, 3–2, 2–8)	Saskatchewan Rush	Scotiabank Saddledome; Attendance: 12,211

Game reference

Mike Poulin
Frankie Scigliano
Goalies
Aaron Bold

	0–1	01:18 – Davis (Taylor, Matthews)
O'Connor (Dobbie, Dickson) – 01:44	1–1
	1–2	03:32 – Matthews (Mydske)
Dickson (Shattler, Manning) – 04:19	2–2
	2–3	05:21 – Bilic
Harnett (Dobbie) (PP) – 11:35	3–3
	3–4	14:51 – Church (Taylor, Davis)
	3–5	21:25 – McIntosh (Matthews, Greer) (PP)
Berg (Dobbie, O'Connor) – 22:22	4–5
	4–6	25:12 – McIntosh (Taylor, Corbeil)
Shattler (Leung, McIntosh) – 27:05	5–6
	5–7	30:06 – Thompson
Dobbie (Dickson, Berg) (PP) – 31:01	6–7
Digby (O'Connor, Harnett) – 31:50	7–7
Dickson (Bell, Harnett) –33:42	8–7
	8–8	41:21 – Mydske
	8–9	47:09 – Church (Dilks, Bold)
	8–10	48:52 – Matthews (Church) (PP)
	8–11	50:42 – Bilic
Shattler (Dobbie, Digby) – 51:19	9–11
	9–12	52:22 – McIntosh (Matthews, Church)
	9–13	54:50 – Corbeil
	9–14	57:49 – McIntosh (Sorichetti, Corbeil) (ENG)
Dickson (Shattler, O'Connor) – 58:22	10–14
	10–15	58:33 – Corbeil (Rubisch) (ENG)
	10–16	59:33 – Cornwall (Corbeil, Taylor) (ENG)

14 min
Penalties
12 min
45
Shots
52

May 21, 2016	Saskatchewan Rush	12–9 (1–1, 4–2, 3–2, 4–4)	Calgary Roughnecks	SaskTel Centre; Attendance: 15,192

Game reference

Aaron Bold
Goalies
Mike Poulin
Frankie Scigliano

Church (Matthews) – 04:11	1–0
	1–1	11:47 – Digby (Berg, O'Connor)
Greer (Matthews, Church) – 16:09	2–1
Matthews (LaFontaine, Bold) – 16:34	3–1
	3–2	18:25 – Berg (O'Connor, McFetridge)
Church (Greer, Matthews) (PP) – 20:32	4–2
	4–3	27:23 – Dobbie (Dickson) (PP)
McIntosh (Church, Greer)	5–3
LaFontaine (Matthews, Davis) – 35:11	6–3
McIntosh (Cornwall) – 38:33	7–3
	7–4	39:43 – McFetridge (Harnett)
Sorichetti (Rubisch) – 41:24	8–4
	8–5	43:00 – Dickson (Dobbie, Shattler) (PP)
	8–6	47:04 – Digby (Berg)
Greer (Davis) – 50:26	9–6
Matthews (Bilic, Thompson) (ENG) – 50:34	10–6
Greer (Matthews, Church) – 53:51	11–6
Greer (McIntosh, Taylor) – 55:10	12–6
	12–7	56:08 – Dobbie (O'Connor)
	12–8	57:47 – Digby (O'Connor)
	12–9	59:10 – Digby (O'Connor)

6 min
Penalties
10 min
49
Shots
48

Rush wins series 2–0.

=== NLL Finals (best of three) ===
==== (E1) Buffalo Bandits vs. (W1) Saskatchewan Rush ====
May 28, 2016	Buffalo Bandits	9–11 (0–2, 6–4, 2–2, 1–3)	Saskatchewan Rush	First Niagara Center; Attendance: 12,692

Game reference

Anthony Cosmo
Goalies
Aaron Bold

	0–1	07:51 – Matthews (Church, Davis)
	0–2	13:50 – Sorichetti
	0–3	15:53 – Matthews (Church) (PP)
Malcom (Weiss, Jones) – 17:13	1–3
D. Smith (PP) – 18:19	2–3
	2–4	20:26 – Cornwall
Benesch (D. Smith) (PP) – 21:58	3–4
Steenhuis (D. Smith, Culp) – 23:53	4–4
Malcom (D. Smith, Benesch) – 24:01	5–4
Hill (Thorimbert) – 24:43	6–4
	6–5	25:49 – Greer (Matthews)
	6–6	27:20 – Davis (Knight, Matthews)
D. Smith (Veltman, Culp) – 32:36	7–6
	7–7	36:37 – Church (Knight)
D. Smith (Steenhuis) – 42:12	8–7
	8–8	42:50 – McIntosh (Greer) (PP)
Benesch – 49:18	9–8
	9–9	50:04 – Church (McIntosh, Sorichetti)
	9–10	55:44 – McIntosh (Davis)
	9–11	56:34 – Greer (Church, Knight)

6 min
Penalties
4 min
52
Shots
52

June 4, 2016	Saskatchewan Rush	11–10 (3–4, 2–1, 2–4, 4–1)	Buffalo Bandits	SaskTel Centre; Attendance: 15,182

Game reference

Aaron Bold
Goalies
Anthony Cosmo

Matthews (Church, Knight) – 01:14	1–0
Knight (Taylor, Davis) – 01:50	2–0
	2–1	06:49 – Malcom (D. Smith, Culp)
	2–2	09:09 – Watt
	2–3	11:25 – Benesch (D. Smith, Hill)
McIntosh (Taylor, Matthews) (PP) – 12:36	3–3
	3–4	13:37 – D. Smith (Benesch)
Knight (Church, Bilic) – 19:11	4–4
	4–5	29:12 – Hill (D. Smith, Culp)
Greer (Matthews, Church) – 29:55	5–5
	5–6	31:05 – Weiss (Jones)
	5–7	34:04 – Benesch (D. Smith, Steenhuis) (PP)
McIntosh (Knight) – 36:49	6–7
Greer (Corbeil, Dilks) (SH) – 38:51	7–7
	7–8	42:48 – Steenhuis (Brock)
	7–9	44:16 – D. Smith (Culp)
Matthews (Church) (PP) – 49:12	8–9
Church (Greer, Matthews) – 54:29	9–9
	9–10	55:36 – Brownwell (Brock)
Church (Matthews, Knight) – 55:25	10–10
Cornwall – 59:48	11–10

11 min
Penalties
8 min
54
Shots
57

Rush wins series 2–0.

== Awards ==
=== Annual awards ===
Award	Winner	Other Finalists
Most Valuable Player	Dhane Smith, Buffalo	Shawn Evans, New England; Mark Matthews, Saskatchewan
Goaltender of the Year	Evan Kirk, New England	Nick Rose, Toronto; Dillon Ward, Colorado
Defensive Player of the Year	Ryan Dilks, Saskatchewan	Chris Corbeil, Saskatchewan; Steve Priolo, Buffalo
Transition Player of the Year	Brad Self, Rochester	Jordan MacIntosh, Georgia; Jeremy Thompson, Saskatchewan
Rookie of the Year	Randy Staats, Georgia	Wesley Berg, Calgary; Jesse King, Georgia
Sportsmanship Award	Ben McIntosh, Saskatchewan	Karsen Leung, Calgary; Kiel Matisz, Georgia
GM of the Year	Steve Dietrich, Buffalo	John Arlotta, Georgia; Rich Lisk, New England
Les Bartley Award	Glenn Clark, New England	Troy Cordingley, Buffalo; Derek Keenan, Saskatchewan
Executive of the Year Award	Lee Genier, Saskatchewan	Mike French, New England; Scott Loffler, Buffalo
Teammate of the Year Award	Mike Poulin, Calgary	Joel McCready, Vancouver; Andrew Watt, Buffalo
Air Canada Wingman of the Year Award	Callum Crawford, Colorado	Rob Hellyer, Toronto; Dhane Smith
Tom Borrelli Award	Teddy Jenner, ILIndoor.com	

=== Monthly awards ===
Awards are presented monthly for the best overall player and best rookie.

Month	Overall	Rookie
January	Dhane Smith- Buffalo Bandits	Randy Staats- Georgia Swarm
February	Dhane Smith- Buffalo Bandits	Jesse King- Georgia Swarm
March	Dhane Smith- Buffalo Bandits	Wesley Berg- Calgary Roughnecks
April	Rob Hellyer- Toronto Rock	Randy Staats- Georgia Swarm

== Stadiums and locations ==
Buffalo Bandits	Georgia Swarm	New England Black Wolves	Rochester Knighthawks	Toronto Rock
KeyBank Center	Infinite Energy Arena	Mohegan Sun Arena	Blue Cross Arena	Air Canada Centre
Capacity: 19,070	Capacity: 11,355	Capacity: 7,700	Capacity: 11,200	Capacity: 18,819

Calgary Roughnecks	Colorado Mammoth	Saskatchewan Rush	Vancouver Stealth
Scotiabank Saddledome	Pepsi Center	SaskTel Centre	Langley Events Centre
Capacity: 19,289	Capacity: 18,007	Capacity: 15,190	Capacity: 5,276

== Attendance ==
=== Regular season ===
Home team	Home games	Average attendance	Total attendance
Buffalo Bandits	9	15,833	142,505
Colorado Mammoth	9	13,832	124,489
Saskatchewan Rush	9	11,737	105,637
Calgary Roughnecks	9	11,471	103,246
Toronto Rock	9	9,159	82,432
Rochester Knighthawks	9	8,164	73,483
Georgia Swarm	9	4,667	42,010
Vancouver Stealth	9	3,758	33,828
New England Black Wolves	9	3,751	33,761
League	81	9,152	741,391

=== Playoffs ===
Home team	Home games	Average attendance	Total attendance
Saskatchewan Rush	2	15,187	30,374
Buffalo Bandits	2	13,473	26,947
Colorado Mammoth	1	13,116	13,116
Calgary Roughnecks	1	13,116	13,116
New England Black Wolves	2	3,481	6,963
League	8	11,201	89,611

== See also ==
- 2016 in sports
