= 2016 Buffalo Bandits season =

2016 Buffalo Bandits
- East Division Champions
- League: NLL
- Division: 1st East
- 2016 record: 13–5
- Home record: 8–1
- Road record: 5–4
- Goals for: 251
- Goals against: 214
- General Manager: Steve Dietrich
- Coach: Troy Cordingley
- Captain: Billy Dee Smith
- Arena: First Niagara Center

Team leaders
- Goals: Dhane Smith (72)
- Assists: Dhane Smith (65)
- Points: Dhane Smith (137)
- Penalties in minutes: Steve Priolo (61)
- Loose Balls: Jay Thorimbert (129)
- Wins: Anthony Cosmo (8)
- Goals against average: Anthony Cosmo (11.73)

The Buffalo Bandits are a lacrosse team based in Buffalo, New York playing in the National Lacrosse League (NLL). The 2016 season was their 25th season in the NLL.

The Bandits had their best season in years, finishing with a franchise-record 13 wins. Their 13–5 record gave the team first place in the East Division and also clinched the first seed for the playoffs. The team only lost two games in a row once and finished the season winning 9 of their last 10 games.

Buffalo beat New England 2 games to none in the semifinals, but lost two close games to the Saskatchewan Rush in the Championship.

The team was led by Dhane Smith, who had one of the best offensive years in NLL history. Smith set new records for both goals in a season with 72 and points in a season with 137.

== Regular season ==
=== Final standings ===
East Division
P	Team	GP	W	L	PCT	GB	Home	Road	GF	GA	Diff	GF/GP	GA/GP
1	Buffalo Bandits – xyz	18	13	5	.722	0.0	8–1	5–4	251	214	+37	13.94	11.89
2	New England Black Wolves – x	18	10	8	.556	3.0	6–3	4–5	229	212	+17	12.72	11.78
3	Georgia Swarm – x	18	8	10	.444	5.0	4–5	4–5	238	240	−2	13.22	13.33
4	Rochester Knighthawks	18	7	11	.389	6.0	3–6	4–5	200	215	−15	11.11	11.94
5	Toronto Rock	18	5	13	.278	8.0	4–5	1–8	190	224	−34	10.56	12.44

West Division
P	Team	GP	W	L	PCT	GB	Home	Road	GF	GA	Diff	GF/GP	GA/GP
1	Saskatchewan Rush – xy	18	13	5	.722	0.0	7–2	6–3	233	190	+43	12.94	10.56
2	Colorado Mammoth – x	18	12	6	.667	1.0	8–1	4–5	203	202	+1	11.28	11.22
3	Calgary Roughnecks – x	18	8	10	.444	5.0	5–4	3–6	216	216	−-0	12.00	12.00
4	Vancouver Stealth	18	5	13	.278	8.0	4–5	1–8	198	245	−47	11.00	13.61

x: Clinched playoff berth; c: Clinched playoff berth by crossing over to another division; y: Clinched division; z: Clinched best regular season record; GP: Games Played
W: Wins; L: Losses; GB: Games back; PCT: Win percentage; Home: Record at Home; Road: Record on the Road; GF: Goals scored; GA: Goals allowed
Differential: Difference between goals scored and allowed; GF/GP: Average number of goals scored per game; GA/GP: Average number of goals allowed per game

=== Game log ===
Game	Date	Opponent	Location	Score	OT	Attendance	Record
1	January 9, 2016	Calgary Roughnecks	First Niagara Center	W 10–9		14,286	1–0
2	January 16, 2016	@ Colorado Mammoth	Pepsi Center	L 14–15	OT	14,125	1–1
3	January 23, 2016	Toronto Rock	First Niagara Center	W 12–6		13,359	2–1
4	January 30, 2016	@ New England Black Wolves	Mohegan Sun Arena	L 11–15		3,874	2–2
5	February 6, 2016	New England Black Wolves	First Niagara Center	W 12–10		13,556	3–2
6	February 14, 2016	@ Georgia Swarm	Infinite Energy Arena	W 21–14		4,971	4–2
7	February 19, 2016	@ Toronto Rock	Air Canada Centre	L 12–14		7,837	4–3
8	February 20, 2016	Georgia Swarm	First Niagara Center	L 15–19		14,515	4–4
9	February 26, 2016	@ Saskatchewan Rush	SaskTel Centre	W 19–18	OT	10,433	5–4
10	March 5, 2016	@ Vancouver Stealth	Langley Events Centre	W 13–8		3,382	6–4
11	March 11, 2016	Rochester Knighthawks	First Niagara Center	W 13–10		18,751	7–4
12	March 25, 2016	Vancouver Stealth	First Niagara Center	W 17–10		14,301	8–4
13	April 2, 2016	@ Georgia Swarm	Infinite Energy Arena	W 18–14		3,355	9–4
14	April 9, 2016	Rochester Knighthawks	First Niagara Center	W 14–12		17,397	10–4
15	April 15, 2016	@ Toronto Rock	Air Canada Centre	L 9–12		9,237	10–5
16	April 16, 2016	Toronto Rock	First Niagara Center	W 14–8		17,270	11–5
17	April 23, 2016	@ Rochester Knighthawks	Blue Cross Arena	W 15–13		10,716	12–5
18	April 30, 2016	New England Black Wolves	First Niagara Center	W 17–12		19,070	13–5

== Playoffs ==
Game	Date	Opponent	Location	Score	OT	Attendance	Record
Eastern Final (Game 1)	May 16, 2016	@ New England Black Wolves	Mohegan Sun Arena	W 15–10		3,697	1–0
Eastern Final (Game 2)	May 21, 2016	New England Black Wolves	First Niagara Center	W 20–15		14,423	2–0
Finals; Game 1	May 28, 2016	Saskatchewan Rush	First Niagara Center	L 9–11		12,692	2–1
Finals; Game 2	June 4, 2016	@ Saskatchewan Rush	SaskTel Centre	L 10–11		15,182	2–2

== Roster ==
2016 Buffalo Bandits roster
Active (21-man) roster		Inactive roster	Coaches
Goaltenders: 44 (Canada) Anthony Cosmo; 65 (Canada) Davide DiRuscio; Defensemen: 12 (Canada) Mitch de Snoo; 23 (Canada) Steve Priolo (A); 3 (Canada) Billy Dee Smith (C); 5 (Canada) Adam Will	Forwards: 17 (Canada) Ryan Benesch; 19 (Canada) Chad Culp; 21 (Canada) Tyler Ferreira; 93 (Canada) Anthony Malcom; 92 (Canada) Dhane Smith; 9 (Canada) Mark Steenhuis; 36 (Canada) Daryl Veltman; Transition: 13 (Canada) David Brock (A); 8 (Canada) Kevin Brownell; 66 (Haudenosaunee) Alex Kedoh Hill; 24 (Canada) Mitch Jones; 75 (Canada) Jay Thorimbert; 22 (Canada) Andrew Watt; 20 (Canada) Nick Weiss	Injured reserve: 15 (Canada) Matthew Bennett; 55 (Canada) Mitch Wilde	Head coach {{{Head Coach}}} Legend: * Suspended list; (C) Captain; (A) Alternate captain; Roster updated 2016-01-04; NLL Transactions

== Player stats ==
=== Runners (Top 10) ===
Player	GP	G	A	Pts	LB	PIM
Dhane Smith	18	72	65	137	111	9
Ryan Benesch	17	39	53	92	101	17
Mark Steenhuis	18	34	38	72	68	36
Alexander-Kedoh-Hill	15	16	23	39	120	29
Tony Malcom	17	17	21	38	59	2
Daryl Veltman	17	14	24	38	41	2
Mitch Jones	17	11	22	33	119	4
Chad Culp	14	9	23	32	46	14
Kevin Brownell	18	8	14	22	101	14
Steve Priolo	18	7	12	19	112	61
Totals		251	360	611	1,436	312

=== Goaltenders ===
Player	GP	MIN	W	L	GA	Sv%	GAA
Anthony Cosmo	18	711:00	8	2	139	.783	11.73
Davide DiRuscio	18	376:08	5	3	74	.782	11.80
Totals		1,087:08	13	5	213	.782	11.76

== Transactions ==
=== Trades ===
September 28, 2015	To Buffalo Bandits 55th overall selection, 2015 entry draft	To Saskatchewan Rush 6th round selection, 2018 entry draft

=== Entry Draft ===
The 2015 NLL Entry Draft took place on September 28, 2015. The Bandits made the following selections:

Round	Overall	Player	College/Club
2	11	Anthony Malcom	
3	27	Mike Triolo	
4	36	Tim Edwards	
6	55	Matt Francisco	

== See also ==
- 2016 NLL season
