= 2016 Saskatchewan Rush season =

Overview of lacrosse team's 2016 performance

2016 Saskatchewan Rush
- Champion's Cup Champions
- West Division Champions
- League: NLL
- Division: 1st West
- 2016 record: 13-5
- Home record: 7-2
- Road record: 6-3
- Goals for: 233
- Goals against: 190
- General Manager: Derek Keenan
- Coach: Derek Keenan
- Captain: Chris Corbeil
- Alternate captains: Jarrett Davis; Zack Greer; Brett Mydske; Kyle Rubisch
- Arena: SaskTel Centre
- Average attendance: 12,081

Team leaders
- Goals: Zack Greer (42)
- Assists: Mark Matthews (69)
- Points: Mark Matthews (109)
- Penalties in minutes: Nik Bilic (52)
- Loose Balls: Jeremy Thompson (174)
- Wins: Aaron Bold (12)
- Goals against average: Aaron Bold (10.30)

The Saskatchewan Rush are a lacrosse team based in Saskatoon, Saskatchewan playing in the National Lacrosse League (NLL). The 2016 season was the 11th in franchise history but first in Saskatchewan after playing 10 seasons in Edmonton as the Edmonton Rush. The Rush won the NLL championship in 2015 before relocating.

== Current standings ==
East Division
P	Team	GP	W	L	PCT	GB	Home	Road	GF	GA	Diff	GF/GP	GA/GP
1	Buffalo Bandits – xyz	18	13	5	.722	0.0	8–1	5–4	251	214	+37	13.94	11.89
2	New England Black Wolves – x	18	10	8	.556	3.0	6–3	4–5	229	212	+17	12.72	11.78
3	Georgia Swarm – x	18	8	10	.444	5.0	4–5	4–5	238	240	−2	13.22	13.33
4	Rochester Knighthawks	18	7	11	.389	6.0	3–6	4–5	200	215	−15	11.11	11.94
5	Toronto Rock	18	5	13	.278	8.0	4–5	1–8	190	224	−34	10.56	12.44

West Division
P	Team	GP	W	L	PCT	GB	Home	Road	GF	GA	Diff	GF/GP	GA/GP
1	Saskatchewan Rush – xy	18	13	5	.722	0.0	7–2	6–3	233	190	+43	12.94	10.56
2	Colorado Mammoth – x	18	12	6	.667	1.0	8–1	4–5	203	202	+1	11.28	11.22
3	Calgary Roughnecks – x	18	8	10	.444	5.0	5–4	3–6	216	216	−-0	12.00	12.00
4	Vancouver Stealth	18	5	13	.278	8.0	4–5	1–8	198	245	−47	11.00	13.61

x: Clinched playoff berth; c: Clinched playoff berth by crossing over to another division; y: Clinched division; z: Clinched best regular season record; GP: Games Played
W: Wins; L: Losses; GB: Games back; PCT: Win percentage; Home: Record at Home; Road: Record on the Road; GF: Goals scored; GA: Goals allowed
Differential: Difference between goals scored and allowed; GF/GP: Average number of goals scored per game; GA/GP: Average number of goals allowed per game

== Game log ==
=== Regular season ===
Game	Date	Opponent	Location	Score	OT	Attendance	Record
1	January 2, 2016	@ Calgary Roughnecks	Scotiabank Saddledome	W 10–8		11,977	1–0
2	January 15, 2016	Vancouver Stealth	SaskTel Centre	L 11–13		9,147	1–1
3	January 29, 2016	Colorado Mammoth	SaskTel Centre	W 12–10		8,624	2–1
4	February 5, 2016	Calgary Roughnecks	SaskTel Centre	W 19–12		9,580	3–1
5	February 11, 2016	@ Colorado Mammoth	Pepsi Center	L 7–9		10,841	3–2
6	February 19, 2016	Rochester Knighthawks	SaskTel Centre	W 11–8		11,042	4–2
7	February 26, 2016	Buffalo Bandits	SaskTel Centre	L 18–19	OT	10,423	4–3
8	February 28, 2016	@ Calgary Roughnecks	Scotiabank Saddledome	W 12–11	OT	10,005	5–3
9	March 12, 2016	Georgia Swarm	SaskTel Centre	W 14–8		13,720	6–3
10	March 19, 2016	@ Vancouver Stealth	Langley Events Centre	W 24–16		3,425	7–3
11	March 25, 2016	@ Toronto Rock	Air Canada Centre	W 11–9		8,836	8–3
12	March 26, 2016	Toronto Rock	SaskTel Centre	W 13–8		13,123	9–3
13	April 2, 2016	Calgary Roughnecks	SaskTel Centre	W 11–9		14,941	10–3
14	April 8, 2016	@ New England Black Wolves	Mohegan Sun Arena	L 13–14		2,892	10–4
15	April 15, 2016	@ Colorado Mammoth	Pepsi Center	W 11–5		11,544	11–4
16	April 16, 2016	Colorado Mammoth	SaskTel Centre	W 11–8		15,027	12–4
17	April 23, 2016	@ Vancouver Stealth	Langley Events Centre	L 12–14		4,409	12–5
18	April 30, 2016	@ Rochester Knighthawks	Blue Cross Arena	W 13–9		6,547	13–5

=== Playoffs ===
Game	Date	Opponent	Location	Score	OT	Attendance	Record
Western Final (Game 1)	May 14, 2016	@ Calgary Roughnecks	Scotiabank Saddledome	W 16–10		12,211	1–0
Western Final (Game 2)	May 21, 2016	Calgary Roughnecks	SaskTel Centre	W 12–9		15,192	2–0
Finals; Game 1	May 28, 2016	@ Buffalo Bandits	First Niagara Center	W 11–9		12,692	3–0
Finals; Game 2	June 4, 2016	Buffalo Bandits	SaskTel Centre	W 11–10		15,182	4–0

== Player stats ==
=== Runners (Top 10) ===
Note: GP = Games played; G = Goals; A = Assists; Pts = Points; LB = Loose balls; PIM = Penalty minutes

Player	GP	G	A	Pts	LB	PIM
Mark Matthews	18	40	69	109	76	23
Robert Church	18	35	51	86	98	7
Zack Greer	16	42	28	70	76	16
Ben McIntosh	18	36	26	62	89	9
Curtis Knight	15	22	20	42	51	4
Jarrett Davis	17	8	20	28	54	16
Riley Loewen	12	3	21	24	35	2
Dan Taylor	8	5	18	23	22	0
Chris Corbeil	18	7	13	20	121	4
Jeremy Thompson	18	7	13	20	174	6
Team totals	18	233	339	572	1393	257

=== Goaltenders ===
Note: GP = Games played; MIN = Minutes; W = Wins; L = Losses; GA = Goals against; Sv% = Save percentage; GAA = Goals against average

Player	GP	MIN	W	L	GA	Sv%	GAA
Aaron Bold	18	1042:14	12	5	179	.761	10.30
Tyler Carlson	5	46:33	1	0	10	.706	12.89
Totals			13	5	190	.758	10.56

== Transactions ==
=== Trades ===
September 24, 2015	To Saskatchewan Rush 1st round pick, 2018 entry draft	To Rochester Knighthawks 14th overall pick, 2015 entry draft
September 24, 2015	To Saskatchewan Rush 1st round pick, 2016 NLL Entry Draft	To Rochester Knighthawks 9th overall pick, 2015 entry draft
September 28, 2015	To Saskatchewan Rush 6th round pick, 2018 entry draft	To Buffalo Bandits 55th overall pick, 2015 entry draft

=== Entry Draft ===
The 2015 NLL Entry Draft took place on September 28, 2015. The Rush made the following selections:

Round	Overall	Player	College/Club
2	12	Dan Taylor	Lehigh
2	18	Doug Buchan	Niagara
3	30	Justin Goodwin	
3	31	Luke Gillespie	
4	40	Jimmy McBride	
5	47	Reagan Harding	

== Roster ==
Saskatchewan Rush roster
Active (21-man) roster		Inactive roster	Coaches
Goaltenders: 77 (Canada) Aaron Bold; 30 (Canada) Tyler Carlson; Defensemen: 79 (Canada) Nik Bilic; 24 (Canada) Ryan Dilks; 6 (Canada) John Lintz; 4 (Canada) Kyle Rubisch (A)	Forwards: 17 (Canada) Robert Church; 88 (Canada) Zack Greer (A); 9 (Canada) Curtis Knight; 10 (Canada) Riley Loewen; 42 (Canada) Mark Matthews; 90 (Canada) Ben McIntosh; Transition: 16 (Canada) Chris Corbeil (C); 13 (Canada) Jeff Cornwall; 23 (Canada) Jarrett Davis (A); 33 (Canada) John LaFontaine; 2 (Canada) Brett Mydske (A); 72 (Canada) Adrian Sorichetti; 74 (Haudenosaunee) Jeremy Thompson	Practice squad: 65 (Canada) Doug Buchan (G); 7 (Canada) Jakob Doucet (D); 61 (Canada) Matthew Dinsdale (F); 47 (Canada) Matt MacGrotty (D)	Head coach {{{Head Coach}}} Legend: * Suspended list; (C) Captain; (A) Alternate captain; [www.saskrush.com] updated 2016-05-01; NLL Transactions

== See also ==
- 2016 NLL season
