= Evan Kirk =

Canadian lacrosse player

Personal information
- Nickname: Kirky
- Nationality: Canadian
- Born: July 22, 1987 (age 38) Orangeville, Ontario
- Height: 5 ft 11 in (180 cm)
- Weight: 190 lb (86 kg; 13 st 8 lb)

Sport
- Position: Goaltender
- Shoots: Right
- NLL draft: 6th overall, 2011; Minnesota Swarm
- NLL team Former teams: Rochester Knighthawks; New England Black Wolves; Minnesota Swarm
- MSL team: Peterborough Lakers
- Pro career: 2011–

Evan Kirk (born July 22, 1987), is a Canadian professional box lacrosse goaltender in the National Lacrosse League, currently playing for the Rochester Knighthawks and for the Peterborough Lakers of the Major Series Lacrosse. He was a member of Team Canada during the 2010 World Lacrosse Championship.

Evan was born in Orangeville, Ontario. Outside of professional lacrosse, Kirk is an Under Armour product rep under their lacrosse line. He graduated Hobart College in New York where he majored in Environmental Studies.

== Junior career ==
Kirk had a four-year junior career. He played for three seasons with the Orangeville Northmen Jr. A from 2005-2007 and one season with the Kitchener-Waterloo Braves in 2008 in the OLA Junior A Lacrosse League.

== High school career ==
Evan played high school field lacrosse at Salisbury School. The Salisbury Knights compete in the NEPSAC league where the lacrosse program is nationally recognized and has been crowned Western New England Champions five out of the last ten years to 2014.

== College career ==
Kirk is also a graduate of Hobart and William Smith Colleges, where he played goal and was named team Captain. Kirk also won the Hobart and William Smith Colleges' Kent W. Marbury Memorial Award which is presented to a member of the lacrosse team who, through dedication and hard work best exemplifies the characteristics of Kent Marbury.

== NLL career ==
Kirk was acquired by the Minnesota Swarm in the 2011 NLL entry draft in the first round (sixth overall). In the 2011 NLL season, Evan played sparingly with the Swarm. Following his two season in Minnesota, he was traded to the New England Black Wolves.

In 2016, Kirk took over the starting goaltender role for the Black Wolves. In 2016, Kirk won the NLL Goalie of the Year Award and was named to the NLL All-Pro Team. Kirk played in 70 games for the Black Wolves over his four seasons, compiling a record of 26-32 and set the 2017 franchise record for most saves by a goaltender in a single season of 676. In 2016, Kirk won the NLL Goalie of the Year Award and was named to the NLL All-Pro Team.

On August 1, 2017, the New England Black Wolves announced that they have traded goalie Evan Kirk to the Saskatchewan Rush, in exchange, New England received the No. 8 overall pick in the 2017 NLL Entry Draft as well as a second round pick in the 2018 NLL Entry Draft and Saskatchewan's Goaltender Aaron Bold and John LaFontaine. In 2018, the Rush posted a league-best 14-4 record during the regular season and Kirk helped lead them to the NLL Division Title and Kirk's first ever NLL Cup in the 2018 season.

== Statistics ==
=== NLL ===
Evan Kirk		Regular Season								Playoffs							
Season	Team	GP	Min	W	L	GA	GAA	Sv	Sv %	GP	Min	W	L	GA	GAA	Sv	Sv %
2012	Minnesota Swarm	16	415:47	4	4	68	9.81	284	0.807	2	116:06	1	0	20	10.34	64	0.762
2013	Minnesota Swarm	16	393:59	3	3	95	14.47	262	0.734	2	0:00	0	0	0	0.00	0	0.000
2014	Philadelphia Wings	16	817:35	5	8	158	11.60	518	0.766	–	–	–	–	–	–	–	–
2015	New England Black Wolves	18	943:18	4	13	213	13.55	571	0.728	–	–	–	–	–	–	–	–
2016	New England Black Wolves	18	844:58	9	4	166	11.79	620	0.789	3	154:30	1	1	43	16.70	118	0.733
2017	New England Black Wolves	18	940:17	8	7	201	12.83	676	0.771	1	52:58	0	1	15	16.99	38	0.717
2018	Saskatchewan Rush	18	926:05	12	3	167	10.82	583	0.777	4	237:37	3	1	44	11.11	145	0.767
		120	5,281:59	45	42	1,068	12.13	3,514	0.767	12	561:11	5	3	122	13.04	365	0.749
Career Total:		132	5,843:10	50	45	1,190	12.22	3,879	0.765								

GP–Games played;Min–Minutes played;W–Wins;L–Losses;GA–Goals against;GAA–Goals against average;Sv–Number of saves;Sv %–Save percentage;

== Awards ==
Preceded by Matt Vinc	NLL Goaltender of the Year; 2017	Succeeded by TBD

- Earned a silver medal with Team Canada for the 2010 FIL World Lacrosse Championships
- 2018 NLL Cup Winner with Saskatchewan Rush
- 2017 NLL Goalie of the Year
- 2012 NLL All Rookie Team
- 2012 MSL Most valuable Player
- 2013 Mann Cup Winner with Six Nations
- 2014 Mann Cup Winner with Six Nations
- 2017 Mann Cup Winner with Peterborough
- 2013 Harry Lumley Trophy for Fewest Goals in an MSL Season
- 2014 Harry Lumley Trophy for Fewest Goals in an MSL Season
- 2017 Harry Lumley Trophy for Fewest Goals in an MSL Season
- 2011 Kent W. Marbury Memorial Award
- 2012 Jim Murphy Award as the league MSL MVP
