= 2016 Colorado Mammoth season =

2016 Colorado Mammoth
- League: NLL
- Division: 2nd West
- 2016 record: 12-6
- Home record: 8-1
- Road record: 4-5
- Goals for: 203
- Goals against: 202
- General Manager: Steve Govett
- Coach: Dan Stroup, Pat Coyle, Chris Gill
- Captain: Dan Coates
- Arena: Pepsi Center

Team leaders
- Goals: Adam Jones (42)
- Assists: Callum Crawford (83)
- Points: Callum Crawford (115)
- Penalties in minutes: Dan Coates (25)
- Loose Balls: Robert Hope (128)
- Wins: Dillon Ward (7)
- Goals against average: Dillon Ward (10.33)

The Colorado Mammoth are a lacrosse team based in Denver, Colorado playing in the National Lacrosse League (NLL). The 2016 season was the 30th in franchise history and 14th as the Mammoth (previously the Washington Power, Pittsburgh Crossefire, and Baltimore Thunder).

== Final standings ==
East Division
P	Team	GP	W	L	PCT	GB	Home	Road	GF	GA	Diff	GF/GP	GA/GP
1	Buffalo Bandits – xyz	18	13	5	.722	0.0	8–1	5–4	251	214	+37	13.94	11.89
2	New England Black Wolves – x	18	10	8	.556	3.0	6–3	4–5	229	212	+17	12.72	11.78
3	Georgia Swarm – x	18	8	10	.444	5.0	4–5	4–5	238	240	−2	13.22	13.33
4	Rochester Knighthawks	18	7	11	.389	6.0	3–6	4–5	200	215	−15	11.11	11.94
5	Toronto Rock	18	5	13	.278	8.0	4–5	1–8	190	224	−34	10.56	12.44

West Division
P	Team	GP	W	L	PCT	GB	Home	Road	GF	GA	Diff	GF/GP	GA/GP
1	Saskatchewan Rush – xy	18	13	5	.722	0.0	7–2	6–3	233	190	+43	12.94	10.56
2	Colorado Mammoth – x	18	12	6	.667	1.0	8–1	4–5	203	202	+1	11.28	11.22
3	Calgary Roughnecks – x	18	8	10	.444	5.0	5–4	3–6	216	216	−-0	12.00	12.00
4	Vancouver Stealth	18	5	13	.278	8.0	4–5	1–8	198	245	−47	11.00	13.61

x: Clinched playoff berth; c: Clinched playoff berth by crossing over to another division; y: Clinched division; z: Clinched best regular season record; GP: Games Played
W: Wins; L: Losses; GB: Games back; PCT: Win percentage; Home: Record at Home; Road: Record on the Road; GF: Goals scored; GA: Goals allowed
Differential: Difference between goals scored and allowed; GF/GP: Average number of goals scored per game; GA/GP: Average number of goals allowed per game

== Game log ==
=== Regular season ===
Game	Date	Opponent	Location	Score	OT	Attendance	Record
1	January 1, 2016	Georgia Swarm	Pepsi Center	W 16–15		15,090	1–0
2	January 9, 2016	@ Rochester Knighthawks	Blue Cross Arena	W 16–14		7,982	2–0
3	January 16, 2016	Buffalo Bandits	Pepsi Center	W 15–14		14,125	3–0
4	January 23, 2016	@ Vancouver Stealth	Langley Events Centre	W 14–5		3,626	4–0
5	January 29, 2016	@ Saskatchewan Rush	SaskTel Centre	L 10–12		8,624	4–1
6	February 6, 2016	@ Vancouver	Langley Events Centre	L 7–15		4,066	4–2
7	February 11, 2016	Saskatchewan Rush	Pepsi Center	W 9–7		10,841	5–2
8	February 13, 2016	@ Calgary Roughnecks	Scotiabank Saddledome	W 13–8		9,888	6–2
9	February 27, 2016	Vancouver Stealth	Pepsi Center	W 11–10		14,009	7–2
10	March 5, 2016	New England Black Wolves	Pepsi Center	W 14–13		15,009	8–2
11	March 19, 2016	@ Calgary Roughnecks	Scotiabank Saddledome	L 9–13		10,139	8–3
12	March 26, 2016	Calgary Roughnecks	Pepsi Center	W 13–12		14,127	9–3
13	April 2, 2016	@ New England Black Wolves	Mohegan Sun Arena	W 12–10		3,554	10–3
14	April 10, 2016	@ Georgia Swarm	Infinite Energy Center	L 10–17		3,577	10–4
15	April 15, 2016	Saskatchewan Rush	Pepsi Center	L 5–11		11,544	10–5
16	April 16, 2016	@ Saskatchewan Rush	SaskTel Centre	L 8–11		15,027	10–6
17	April 23, 2016	Toronto Rock	Pepsi Center	W 10–5		14,122	11–6
18	April 29, 2016	Vancouver Stealth	Pepsi Center	W 11–10		15,622	12–6

=== Playoffs ===
Game	Date	Opponent	Location	Score	OT	Attendance	Record
Western division semi-final	May 7, 2016	Calgary Roughnecks	Pepsi Center	L 10–11	OT	13,116	0–1

== Roster ==
Colorado Mammoth roster
Active (21-man) roster		Inactive roster	Coaches
Goaltenders: 27 (Canada) Alexis Buque; 45 (Canada) Dillon Ward; Defensemen: 37 (Canada) Dan Coates (C); 82 (Canada) Joey Cupido; 15 (Canada) Ilija Gajic; 19 (Canada) Cameron Holding (A); 18 (Canada) Robert Hope; 23 (Canada) Jordan Gilles; 62 (Canada) Creighton Reid; 4 (Canada) Josh Sullivan; 94 (Canada) Bryce Sweeting	Forwards: 98 (Canada) Callum Crawford; 90 (Canada) Jackson Decker; 24 (Canada) John Grant, Jr. (A); 16 (Canada) Adam Jones; 51 (Canada) Eli McLaughlin; 35 (Canada) Jeremy Noble; 17 (Canada) Chris Wardle	Injured reserve: 61 (Canada) Mike Burke (F); 8 (United States) Greg Downing (D)	Head coach {{{Head Coach}}} Legend: * Suspended list; (C) Captain; (A) Alternate captain; updated 2016-06-01; NLL Transactions

== Transactions ==
=== Entry Draft ===
The 2015 NLL Entry Draft took place on September 28, 2015. The Mammoth made the following selections:

Round	Overall	Player	College/Club
4	32	Bryce Sweeting	
5	45	Dane Sorensen	
6	52	Jordan Gilles	

== See also ==
- 2016 NLL season
