= 2016 Calgary Roughnecks season =

2016 Calgary Roughnecks
- League: NLL
- Division: 3rd West
- 2016 record: 8-10
- Home record: 5-4
- Road record: 3-6
- Goals for: 216
- Goals against: 216
- General Manager: Mike Board
- Coach: Curt Malawsky
- Captain: Mike Carnegie
- Arena: Scotiabank Saddledome

Team leaders
- Goals: Curtis Dickson (61)
- Assists: Jeff Shattler (57)
- Points: Curtis Dickson (108)
- Penalties in minutes: Tyson Bell (52)
- Loose Balls: Dan MacRae (104)
- Wins: Mike Poulin (4); Frankie Scigliano (4)
- Goals against average: Mike Poulin (11.45)

The Calgary Roughnecks are a lacrosse team based in Calgary playing in the National Lacrosse League (NLL). The 2016 season was the 15th in franchise history.

== Final standings ==
East Division
P	Team	GP	W	L	PCT	GB	Home	Road	GF	GA	Diff	GF/GP	GA/GP
1	Buffalo Bandits – xyz	18	13	5	.722	0.0	8–1	5–4	251	214	+37	13.94	11.89
2	New England Black Wolves – x	18	10	8	.556	3.0	6–3	4–5	229	212	+17	12.72	11.78
3	Georgia Swarm – x	18	8	10	.444	5.0	4–5	4–5	238	240	−2	13.22	13.33
4	Rochester Knighthawks	18	7	11	.389	6.0	3–6	4–5	200	215	−15	11.11	11.94
5	Toronto Rock	18	5	13	.278	8.0	4–5	1–8	190	224	−34	10.56	12.44

West Division
P	Team	GP	W	L	PCT	GB	Home	Road	GF	GA	Diff	GF/GP	GA/GP
1	Saskatchewan Rush – xy	18	13	5	.722	0.0	7–2	6–3	233	190	+43	12.94	10.56
2	Colorado Mammoth – x	18	12	6	.667	1.0	8–1	4–5	203	202	+1	11.28	11.22
3	Calgary Roughnecks – x	18	8	10	.444	5.0	5–4	3–6	216	216	−-0	12.00	12.00
4	Vancouver Stealth	18	5	13	.278	8.0	4–5	1–8	198	245	−47	11.00	13.61

x: Clinched playoff berth; c: Clinched playoff berth by crossing over to another division; y: Clinched division; z: Clinched best regular season record; GP: Games Played
W: Wins; L: Losses; GB: Games back; PCT: Win percentage; Home: Record at Home; Road: Record on the Road; GF: Goals scored; GA: Goals allowed
Differential: Difference between goals scored and allowed; GF/GP: Average number of goals scored per game; GA/GP: Average number of goals allowed per game

== Game log ==
=== Regular season ===
Game	Date	Opponent	Location	Score	OT	Attendance	Record
1	January 2, 2016	Saskatchewan Rush	Scotiabank Saddledome	L 8–10		11,977	0–1
2	January 9, 2016	@ Buffalo Bandits	First Niagara Center	L 9–10		14,286	0–2
3	January 15, 2016	@ New England Black Wolves	Mohegan Sun Arena	W 9–8		5,589	1–2
4	January 30, 2016	Vancouver Stealth	Scotiabank Saddledome	W 15–13		13,769	2–2
5	February 5, 2016	@ Saskatchewan Rush	SaskTel Centre	L 12–19		9,580	2–3
6	February 6, 2016	Georgia Swarm	Scotiabank Saddledome	W 12–11		9,531	3–3
7	February 13, 2016	Colorado Mammoth	Scotiabank Saddledome	L 8–13		9,888	3–4
8	February 20, 2016	@ Vancouver Stealth	Langley Events Centre	L 13–14	OT	3,974	3–5
9	February 28, 2016	Saskatchewan Rush	Scotiabank Saddledome	L 11–12	OT	10,005	3–6
10	March 5, 2016	Rochester Knighthawks	Scotiabank Saddledome	L 8–9	OT	9,101	3–7
11	March 11, 2016	@ Toronto Rock	Air Canada Centre	W 15–10		8,178	4–7
12	March 19, 2016	Colorado Mammoth	Scotiabank Saddledome	W 13–9		10,139	5–7
13	March 25, 2016	@ Georgia Swarm	Infinite Energy Arena	W 16–12		3,348	6–7
14	March 26, 2016	@ Colorado Mammoth	Pepsi Center	L 12–13	OT	14,127	6–8
15	April 2, 2016	@ Saskatchewan Rush	SaskTel Centre	L 9–11		14,941	6–9
16	April 9, 2016	Vancouver Stealth	Scotiabank Saddledome	W 16–12		12,856	7–9
17	April 16, 2016	@ Vancouver Stealth	Langley Events Centre	L 12–13		3,156	7–10
18	April 30, 2016	Toronto Rock	Scotiabank Saddledome	W 18–17	OT	15,980	8–10

=== Playoffs ===
Game	Date	Opponent	Location	Score	OT	Attendance	Record
Western division semi-final	May 7, 2016	@ Colorado Mammoth	Pepsi Center	W 11–10	OT	13,116	1–0
Western Final (Game 1)	May 14, 2016	Saskatchewan Rush	Scotiabank Saddledome	L 10–16		12,211	1–1
Western Final (Game 2)	May 21, 2016	@ Saskatchewan Rush	SaskTel Centre	L 9–12		15,192	1–2

== Transactions ==
=== Trades ===
October 26, 2015	To Calgary Roughnecks Tyler Digby; 1st round selection, 2018 entry draft 1st round selection, 2019 entry draft	To New England Black Wolves Shawn Evans; 3rd round selection, 2018 entry draft

=== Entry Draft ===
The 2015 NLL Entry Draft took place on September 28, 2015. The Roughnecks made the following selections:

Round	Overall	Player	College/Club
1	4	Wesley Berg	
1	7	Reilly O'Connor	
2	13	Mitch De Snoo	
2	15	Christian Del Bianco	
3	24	Tyson Bell	
3	25	Kellen LeClair	
4	35	Jacob Ruest	
5	44	Jordan Kanscal	
6	51	Carson Barton	

== See also ==
- 2016 NLL season
