= 2016 Rochester Knighthawks season =

2016 Rochester Knighthawks
- League: NLL
- Division: 4th East
- 2016 record: 6-11
- Home record: 3-6
- Road record: 3-5
- Goals for: 190
- Goals against: 207
- General Manager: Curt Styres
- Coach: Mike Hasen
- Captain: Sid Smith
- Arena: Blue Cross Arena

Team leaders
- Goals: Dan Dawson (38)
- Assists: Cody Jamieson (60)
- Points: Cody Jamieson (93)
- Penalties in minutes: Sid Smith (46)
- Loose Balls: Brad Self (100)
- Wins: Matt Vinc (5)
- Goals against average: Matt Vinc (11.60)

The Rochester Knighthawks were a lacrosse team based in Rochester, New York, that played in the National Lacrosse League (NLL). The 2016 season was the 22nd in franchise history.

== Regular season ==
=== Final standings ===
East Division
P	Team	GP	W	L	PCT	GB	Home	Road	GF	GA	Diff	GF/GP	GA/GP
1	Buffalo Bandits – xyz	18	13	5	.722	0.0	8–1	5–4	251	214	+37	13.94	11.89
2	New England Black Wolves – x	18	10	8	.556	3.0	6–3	4–5	229	212	+17	12.72	11.78
3	Georgia Swarm – x	18	8	10	.444	5.0	4–5	4–5	238	240	−2	13.22	13.33
4	Rochester Knighthawks	18	7	11	.389	6.0	3–6	4–5	200	215	−15	11.11	11.94
5	Toronto Rock	18	5	13	.278	8.0	4–5	1–8	190	224	−34	10.56	12.44

West Division
P	Team	GP	W	L	PCT	GB	Home	Road	GF	GA	Diff	GF/GP	GA/GP
1	Saskatchewan Rush – xy	18	13	5	.722	0.0	7–2	6–3	233	190	+43	12.94	10.56
2	Colorado Mammoth – x	18	12	6	.667	1.0	8–1	4–5	203	202	+1	11.28	11.22
3	Calgary Roughnecks – x	18	8	10	.444	5.0	5–4	3–6	216	216	−-0	12.00	12.00
4	Vancouver Stealth	18	5	13	.278	8.0	4–5	1–8	198	245	−47	11.00	13.61

x: Clinched playoff berth; c: Clinched playoff berth by crossing over to another division; y: Clinched division; z: Clinched best regular season record; GP: Games Played
W: Wins; L: Losses; GB: Games back; PCT: Win percentage; Home: Record at Home; Road: Record on the Road; GF: Goals scored; GA: Goals allowed
Differential: Difference between goals scored and allowed; GF/GP: Average number of goals scored per game; GA/GP: Average number of goals allowed per game

== Game log ==
Game	Date	Opponent	Location	Score	OT	Attendance	Record
1	January 9, 2016	Colorado Mammoth	Blue Cross Arena	L 14–16		7,982	0–1
2	January 14, 2016	@ Toronto Rock	Air Canada Centre	W 12–7		9,387	1–1
3	January 16, 2016	Toronto Rock	Blue Cross Arena	W 12–5		8,365	2–1
4	January 30, 2016	Georgia Swarm	Blue Cross Arena	L 9–13		8,770	2–2
5	February 13, 2016	Vancouver Stealth	Blue Cross Arena	W 16–15	OT	7,362	3–2
6	February 19, 2016	@ Saskatchewan Rush	SaskTel Centre	L 8–11		11,042	3–3
7	February 27, 2016	@ Toronto Rock	Air Canada Centre	L 6–17		10,299	3–4
8	March 5, 2016	@ Calgary Roughnecks	Scotiabank Saddledome	W 9–8	OT	9,101	4–4
9	March 11, 2016	@ Buffalo Bandits	First Niagara Center	L 10–13		18,751	4–5
10	March 12, 2016	New England Black Wolves	Blue Cross Arena	W 17–13		7,589	5–5
11	March 18, 2016	Georgia Swarm	Blue Cross Arena	W 11–4		4,523	6–5
12	March 25, 2016	@ New England Black Wolves	Mohegan Sun Arena	L 13–16		3,604	6–6
13	March 26, 2016	New England Black Wolves	Blue Cross Arena	L 8–10		7,582	6–7
14	April 9, 2016	@ Buffalo Bandits	First Niagara Center	L 12–14		17,397	6–8
15	April 16, 2016	Georgia Swarm	Blue Cross Arena	L 11–17		8,570	6–9
16	April 23, 2016	Buffalo Bandits	Blue Cross Arena	L 13–15		10,716	6–10
17	April 30, 2016	Saskatchewan Rush	Blue Cross Arena	L 9–13		6,547	6–11
18	May 1, 2016	@ New England Black Wolves	Mohegan Sun Arena	W 10–8		2,895	7–11

== Roster ==
Rochester Knighthawks roster
Active (21-man) roster		Inactive roster	Coaches
Goaltenders: 55 (Iroquois) Angus Goodleaf; 48 (Canada) Matt Vinc; Defensemen: 37 (Canada) Scott Campbell; 2 (Canada) Paul Dawson; 16 (Canada) Dylan Evans; 26 (Canada) Mike Kirk (A); 29 (Canada) Ian Llord; 19 (Canada) Zac Reid; 5 (Canada) Scott Self; 79 (Iroquois) Sid Smith (C); 32 (Canada) Jon Sullivan	Forwards: 6 (Canada) Dan Dawson; 88 (Iroquois) Cody Jamieson (A); 28 (Iroquois) Stephen Keogh; 9 (Iroquois) Craig Point; 15 (United States) Joe Resetarits; 23 (Canada) Cory Vitarelli; 1 (United States) Joe Walters; Transition: 91 (Canada) Joel Matthews; 25 (Canada) Brad Self	Practice squad: 66 (Iroquois) Zach Williams (T)	Head coach {{{Head Coach}}} Legend: * Suspended list; (C) Captain; (A) Alternate captain; updated 2015-05-01; NLL Transactions

== Transactions ==
=== Trades ===
September 24, 2015	To Rochester Knighthawks 9th overall selection, 2015 entry draft	To Saskatchewan Rush 1st round selection, 2016 entry draft
September 24, 2015	To Rochester Knighthawks 14th overall selection, 2015 entry draft	To Saskatchewan Rush 1st round selection, 2018 entry draft

=== Entry Draft ===
The 2015 NLL Entry Draft took place on September 28, 2015. The Knighthawks made the following selections:

Round	Overall	Player	College/Club
1	2	Graeme Hossack	
1	9	Brad Gillies	
2	14	Derek Searle	
2	16	Adam Bomberry	
3	26	John St. John	
4	38	Greg Longboat	

== See also ==
- 2016 NLL season
