= 2016 Vancouver Stealth season =

2016 Vancouver Stealth
- League: NLL
- Division: 4th West
- 2016 record: 5-13
- Home record: 4-5
- Road record: 1-8
- Goals for: 198
- Goals against: 245
- General Manager: Doug Locker
- Coach: Dan Perreault; Jamie Batley
- Captain: Curtis Hodgson
- Alternate captains: Rhys Duch; Cliff Smith
- Arena: Langley Event Centre

Team leaders
- Goals: Rhys Duch (48)
- Assists: Rhys Duch (63)
- Points: Rhys Duch (111)
- Penalties in minutes: Matt Beers (54)
- Loose Balls: Ian Hawksbee (119)
- Wins: Tyler Richards (3)
- Goals against average: Tyler Richards (12.89)

The Vancouver Stealth are a lacrosse team based in Vancouver, British Columbia. The team plays in the National Lacrosse League (NLL). The 2016 season was the 17th in franchise history and the third season in Vancouver. The franchise previously played in Everett, Washington, San Jose, and Albany, New York.

== Regular season ==
=== Final standings ===
East Division
P	Team	GP	W	L	PCT	GB	Home	Road	GF	GA	Diff	GF/GP	GA/GP
1	Buffalo Bandits – xyz	18	13	5	.722	0.0	8–1	5–4	251	214	+37	13.94	11.89
2	New England Black Wolves – x	18	10	8	.556	3.0	6–3	4–5	229	212	+17	12.72	11.78
3	Georgia Swarm – x	18	8	10	.444	5.0	4–5	4–5	238	240	−2	13.22	13.33
4	Rochester Knighthawks	18	7	11	.389	6.0	3–6	4–5	200	215	−15	11.11	11.94
5	Toronto Rock	18	5	13	.278	8.0	4–5	1–8	190	224	−34	10.56	12.44

West Division
P	Team	GP	W	L	PCT	GB	Home	Road	GF	GA	Diff	GF/GP	GA/GP
1	Saskatchewan Rush – xy	18	13	5	.722	0.0	7–2	6–3	233	190	+43	12.94	10.56
2	Colorado Mammoth – x	18	12	6	.667	1.0	8–1	4–5	203	202	+1	11.28	11.22
3	Calgary Roughnecks – x	18	8	10	.444	5.0	5–4	3–6	216	216	−-0	12.00	12.00
4	Vancouver Stealth	18	5	13	.278	8.0	4–5	1–8	198	245	−47	11.00	13.61

x: Clinched playoff berth; c: Clinched playoff berth by crossing over to another division; y: Clinched division; z: Clinched best regular season record; GP: Games Played
W: Wins; L: Losses; GB: Games back; PCT: Win percentage; Home: Record at Home; Road: Record on the Road; GF: Goals scored; GA: Goals allowed
Differential: Difference between goals scored and allowed; GF/GP: Average number of goals scored per game; GA/GP: Average number of goals allowed per game

=== Game log ===
Game	Date	Opponent	Location	Score	OT	Attendance	Record
1	January 9, 2016	New England Black Wolves	Langley Events Centre	L 7–17		4,230	0–1
2	January 15, 2016	@ Saskatchewan Rush	SaskTel Centre	W 13–11		9,147	1–1
3	January 23, 2016	Colorado Mammoth	Langley Events Centre	L 5–14		3,626	1–2
4	January 30, 2016	@ Calgary Roughnecks	Scotiabank Saddledome	L 13–15		13,769	1–3
5	February 6, 2016	Colorado Mammoth	Langley Events Centre	W 15–7		4,066	2–3
6	February 13, 2016	@ Rochester Knighthawks	Blue Cross Arena	L 15–16	OT	7,362	2–4
7	February 20, 2016	Calgary Roughnecks	Langley Events Centre	W 14–13	OT	3,974	3–4
8	February 27, 2016	@ Colorado Mammoth	Pepsi Center	L 10–11		14,009	3–5
9	March 5, 2016	Buffalo Bandits	Langley Events Centre	L 8–13		3,382	3–6
10	March 13, 2016	@ Toronto Rock	Air Canada Centre	L 6–9		8,185	3–7
11	March 19, 2016	Saskatchewan Rush	Langley Events Centre	L 16–24		3,425	3–8
12	March 25, 2016	@ Buffalo Bandits	First Niagara Center	L 10–17		14,301	3–9
13	April 2, 2016	Toronto Rock	Langley Events Centre	L 11–13		3,560	3–10
14	April 9, 2016	@ Calgary Roughnecks	Scotiabank Saddledome	L 12–16		12,856	3–11
15	April 16, 2016	Calgary Roughnecks	Langley Events Centre	W 13–12		3,156	4–11
16	April 23, 2016	Saskatchewan Rush	Langley Events Centre	W 14–12		4,409	5–11
17	April 29, 2016	@ Colorado Mammoth	Pepsi Center	L 10–11		15,622	5–12
18	April 30, 2016	@ Georgia Swarm	Infinite Energy Arena	L 6–14		5,347	5–13

== Roster ==
Vancouver Stealth roster
Active (21-man) roster		Inactive roster	Coaches
Goaltenders: 00 (Canada) Tyler Richards; 61 (Canada) Eric Penney; Defensemen: 2 (Canada) Matt Beers; 6 (Canada) Curtis Hodgson (C); 88 (Canada) Ian Hawksbee; 3 (Canada) Jeff Moleski; 4 (United States) Chris O'Dougherty; 42 (Canada) Rory Smith; 16 (Canada) Ryan Wagner	Forwards: 13 (Canada) Garrett Billings; 78 (Canada) Jordan Durston; 10 (Canada) Rhys Duch (A); 55 (Canada) Joel McCready; 18 (Canada) Logan Schuss; 15 (Canada) Corey Small; Transition: 20 (Canada) Travis Cornwall; 32 (Canada) Mitch McMichael; 23 (Canada) Thomas Hoggarth; 19 (Canada) Justin Salt; 43 (Canada) Jarrett Toll	Practice Squad: 9 (Canada) Keegan Bal (F); 63 (Canada) Brandon Clelland; 50 (Canada) Cody Hagedorn (G); Injured Reserve: 91 (Canada) Tyler Garrison; Holdout: 66 (Canada) Connor Brown (F); 14 (Canada) Matt Delmonico (F); 7 (Canada) Connor Goodwin (F); 21 (United States) Tim Henderson (D); 44 (Canada) Brendan Ranford (T); Unable to play: 8 (Canada) Tyler Hass (T); 5 (Canada) Cliff Smith (A) (F)	Head Coach {{{Head Coach}}} Legend: * Suspended list; (C) Captain; (A) Alternate captain; Roster updated 2016-05-01; NLL Transactions

== Transactions ==
=== Trades ===
October 25, 2015	To Vancouver Stealth Garrett Billings	To New England Black Wolves Tyler Digby; 2nd round selection, 2017 entry draft

=== Entry Draft ===
The 2015 NLL Entry Draft took place on September 28, 2015. The Stealth made the following selections:

Round	Overall	Player	College/Club
2	19	Jordan Durston	
2	21	Shayne Adams	
3	23	Connor Brown	
4	33	Riley Campbell	
4	39	Evan Messenger	
5	42	Ryan Wagner	
5	46	Keegan Letourneau	
6	49	Marvin "Blake" Curry	

== See also ==
- 2016 NLL season
