= 2016 Toronto Rock season =

2016 Toronto Rock
- League: NLL
- Division: 5th East
- 2016 record: 5–13
- Home record: 4–5
- Road record: 1–8
- Goals for: 190
- Goals against: 224
- General Manager: Jamie Dawick
- Coach: John Lovell
- Captain: Colin Doyle
- Alternate captains: Sandy Chapman; Patrick Merrill; Josh Sanderson
- Arena: Air Canada Centre

Team leaders
- Goals: Rob Hellyer (45)
- Assists: Rob Hellyer (69)
- Points: Rob Hellyer (114)
- Penalties in minutes: Billy Hostrawser (95)
- Loose Balls: Brodie Merrill (180)
- Wins: Nick Rose (5)
- Goals against average: Nick Rose (11.26)

The Toronto Rock are a lacrosse team based in Toronto playing in the National Lacrosse League (NLL). The 2016 season was the 19th in franchise history, and 18th as the Rock.

After an 0–6 start to the season, the Rock were able to turn things around, winning three of four including a 17–6 shelling of the Knighthawks. But the turnaround was temporary, as injuries decimated the team. The Rock only won two more games the rest of the season, finishing out of the playoffs for the first time since 2009.

== Regular season ==
=== Finalstandings ===
East Division
P	Team	GP	W	L	PCT	GB	Home	Road	GF	GA	Diff	GF/GP	GA/GP
1	Buffalo Bandits – xyz	18	13	5	.722	0.0	8–1	5–4	251	214	+37	13.94	11.89
2	New England Black Wolves – x	18	10	8	.556	3.0	6–3	4–5	229	212	+17	12.72	11.78
3	Georgia Swarm – x	18	8	10	.444	5.0	4–5	4–5	238	240	−2	13.22	13.33
4	Rochester Knighthawks	18	7	11	.389	6.0	3–6	4–5	200	215	−15	11.11	11.94
5	Toronto Rock	18	5	13	.278	8.0	4–5	1–8	190	224	−34	10.56	12.44

West Division
P	Team	GP	W	L	PCT	GB	Home	Road	GF	GA	Diff	GF/GP	GA/GP
1	Saskatchewan Rush – xy	18	13	5	.722	0.0	7–2	6–3	233	190	+43	12.94	10.56
2	Colorado Mammoth – x	18	12	6	.667	1.0	8–1	4–5	203	202	+1	11.28	11.22
3	Calgary Roughnecks – x	18	8	10	.444	5.0	5–4	3–6	216	216	−-0	12.00	12.00
4	Vancouver Stealth	18	5	13	.278	8.0	4–5	1–8	198	245	−47	11.00	13.61

x: Clinched playoff berth; c: Clinched playoff berth by crossing over to another division; y: Clinched division; z: Clinched best regular season record; GP: Games Played
W: Wins; L: Losses; GB: Games back; PCT: Win percentage; Home: Record at Home; Road: Record on the Road; GF: Goals scored; GA: Goals allowed
Differential: Difference between goals scored and allowed; GF/GP: Average number of goals scored per game; GA/GP: Average number of goals allowed per game

== Game log ==
=== Regular season ===
Game	Date	Opponent	Location	Score	OT	Attendance	Record
1	January 9, 2016	@ Georgia Swarm	Infinite Energy Arena	L 7–12		9,087	0–1
2	January 14, 2016	Rochester Knighthawks	Air Canada Centre	L 7–12		9,387	0–2
3	January 16, 2016	@ Rochester Knighthawks	Blue Cross Arena	L 5–12		8,365	0–3
4	January 23, 2016	@ Buffalo Bandits	First Niagara Center	L 6–12		13,359	0–4
5	January 29, 2016	Georgia Swarm	Air Canada Centre	L 17–20		10,345	0–5
6	February 14, 2016	@ New England Black Wolves	Mohegan Sun Arena	L 16–17	OT	3,512	0–6
7	February 19, 2016	Buffalo Bandits	Air Canada Centre	W 14–12		7,837	1–6
8	February 27, 2016	Rochester Knighthawks	Air Canada Centre	W 17–6		10,299	2–6
9	March 11, 2016	Calgary Roughnecks	Air Canada Centre	L 10–15		8,178	2–7
10	March 13, 2016	Vancouver Stealth	Air Canada Centre	W 9–6		8,185	3–7
11	March 25, 2016	Saskatchewan Rush	Air Canada Centre	L 9–11		8,836	3–8
12	March 26, 2016	@ Saskatchewan Rush	SaskTel Centre	L 8–13		13,123	3–9
13	April 2, 2016	@ Vancouver Stealth	Langley Events Centre	W 9–6		3,560	4–9
14	April 9, 2016	New England Black Wolves	Air Canada Centre	L 10–14		10,128	4–10
15	April 15, 2016	Buffalo Bandits	Air Canada Centre	W 12–9		9,237	5–10
16	April 16, 2016	@ Buffalo Bandits	First Niagara Center	L 8–14		17,270	5–11
17	April 23, 2016	@ Colorado Mammoth	Pepsi Center	L 5–10		14,122	5–12
18	April 30, 2016	@ Calgary Roughnecks	Scotiabank Saddledome	L 17–18	OT	15,980	5–13

== Roster ==
Toronto Rock roster
Active (21-man) roster		Inactive roster	Coaches
Goaltenders: 35 (Canada) Brandon Miller; 66 (Canada) Nick Rose; Defensemen: 16 (Canada) Jamie Batson; 74 (Canada) Colin Boucher; 5 (Canada) Sandy Chapman (A); 44 (Canada) Jeff Gilbert; 91 (Canada) Bill Hostrawser; 20 (Canada) Bradley Kri; 14 (Canada) Rob Marshall; 48 (Canada) Luc Magnan	Forwards: 18 (Canada) Kyle Aquin; 33 (Canada) Kasey Beirnes; 15 (Canada) Turner Evans; 10 (Canada) Rob Hellyer; 17 (Canada) Stephan Leblanc; 41 (Canada) Dan Lintner; 19 (Canada) Josh Sanderson; 71 (Canada) Kevin Ross; Transition: 4 (Canada) Jesse Gamble; 37 (Canada) Brodie Merrill	Practice Squad: 39 (Canada) Steve Fryer (G); Injured Reserve: 21 (Canada) Bill Greer (D); 97 (Canada) Mark Farthing (D); 11 (Canada) Brett Hickey (F); 88 (Canada) Scott Johnston (D); 9 (Canada) Patrick Merrill (A) (D); 3 (Canada) Brock Sorensen (T); Protected list: 23 (Canada) Mike Grimes; Unable to play: 7 (Canada) Colin Doyle (C); 45 (Canada) Damon Edwards	Head Coach {{{Head Coach}}} Legend: * Suspended list; (C) Captain; (A) Alternate captain; Roster updated 2016-02-24; NLL Transactions

== Transactions ==
=== Trades ===
September 28, 2015	To Toronto Rock Mike Grimes; 34th overall selection, 2015 entry draft	To Georgia Swarm 29th overall selection, 2015 entry draft 2nd round selection, 2018 entry draft
October 12, 2015	To Toronto Rock Dan Lintner; 2nd round selection, 2016 entry draft	To New England Black Wolves Kevin Crowley

=== Entry Draft ===
The 2015 NLL Entry Draft took place on September 28, 2015. The Rock made the following selections:

Round	Overall	Player	College/Club
2	10	Turner Evans	
2	17	Luc Magnan	
4	34	Kyle Acquin	
6	53	Jamie Batten	
6	54	Tyler Roche	

== See also ==
- 2016 NLL season
