= 2016 Georgia Swarm season =

National Lacrosse League season

2016 Georgia Swarm
- League: NLL
- Division: 3rd East
- 2016 record: 8-10
- Home record: 4-5
- Road record: 4-5
- Goals for: 238
- Goals against: 240
- General Manager: Joe Sullivan
- Coach: Joe Sullivan
- Captain: Jordan MacIntosh
- Alternate captains: Shayne Jackson; Jason Noble
- Arena: Infinite Energy Arena

Team leaders
- Goals: Shayne Jackson (40)
- Assists: Randy Staats (58)
- Points: Randy Staats (94)
- Penalties in minutes: Jason Noble (39)
- Loose Balls: Jordan MacIntosh (182)
- Wins: Brodie MacDonald (6)
- Goals against average: Brodie MacDonald (12.82)

The 2016 Georgia Swarm season is the first season of the Georgia Swarm, a lacrosse team based in Duluth, Georgia playing in the National Lacrosse League. The team was formerly based in Saint Paul, Minnesota and was known as the Minnesota Swarm.

== Regular season ==
=== Final standings ===
East Division
P	Team	GP	W	L	PCT	GB	Home	Road	GF	GA	Diff	GF/GP	GA/GP
1	Buffalo Bandits – xyz	18	13	5	.722	0.0	8–1	5–4	251	214	+37	13.94	11.89
2	New England Black Wolves – x	18	10	8	.556	3.0	6–3	4–5	229	212	+17	12.72	11.78
3	Georgia Swarm – x	18	8	10	.444	5.0	4–5	4–5	238	240	−2	13.22	13.33
4	Rochester Knighthawks	18	7	11	.389	6.0	3–6	4–5	200	215	−15	11.11	11.94
5	Toronto Rock	18	5	13	.278	8.0	4–5	1–8	190	224	−34	10.56	12.44

West Division
P	Team	GP	W	L	PCT	GB	Home	Road	GF	GA	Diff	GF/GP	GA/GP
1	Saskatchewan Rush – xy	18	13	5	.722	0.0	7–2	6–3	233	190	+43	12.94	10.56
2	Colorado Mammoth – x	18	12	6	.667	1.0	8–1	4–5	203	202	+1	11.28	11.22
3	Calgary Roughnecks – x	18	8	10	.444	5.0	5–4	3–6	216	216	−-0	12.00	12.00
4	Vancouver Stealth	18	5	13	.278	8.0	4–5	1–8	198	245	−47	11.00	13.61

x: Clinched playoff berth; c: Clinched playoff berth by crossing over to another division; y: Clinched division; z: Clinched best regular season record; GP: Games Played
W: Wins; L: Losses; GB: Games back; PCT: Win percentage; Home: Record at Home; Road: Record on the Road; GF: Goals scored; GA: Goals allowed
Differential: Difference between goals scored and allowed; GF/GP: Average number of goals scored per game; GA/GP: Average number of goals allowed per game

=== Game log ===
Game	Date	Opponent	Location	Score	OT	Attendance	Record
1	January 1, 2016	@ Colorado Mammoth	Pepsi Center	L 15–16		15,090	0–1
2	January 9, 2016	Toronto Rock	Infinite Energy Arena	W 12–7		9,087	1–1
3	January 17, 2016	New England Black Wolves	Infinite Energy Arena	L 6–11		4,845	1–2
4	January 29, 2016	@ Toronto Rock	Air Canada Centre	W 20–17		10,345	2–2
5	January 30, 2016	@ Rochester Knighthawks	Blue Cross Arena	W 13–9		8,770	3–2
6	February 6, 2016	@ Calgary Roughnecks	Scotiabank Saddledome	L 11–12		9,531	3–3
7	February 14, 2016	Buffalo Bandits	Infinite Energy Arena	L 14–21		4,971	3–4
8	February 20, 2016	@ Buffalo Bandits	First Niagara Center	W 19–15		14,515	4–4
9	February 28, 2016	@ New England Black Wolves	Mohegan Sun Arena	L 15–16		3,744	4–5
10	March 12, 2016	@ Saskatchewan Rush	SaskTel Centre	L 8–14		13,720	4–6
11	March 18, 2016	Rochester Knighthawks	Infinite Energy Arena	L 4–11		4,523	4–7
12	March 25, 2016	Calgary Roughnecks	Infinite Energy Arena	L 12–16		3,348	4–8
13	April 2, 2016	Buffalo Bandits	Infinite Energy Arena	L 14–18		3,355	4–9
14	April 10, 2016	Colorado Mammoth	Infinite Energy Arena	W 17–10		3,577	5–9
15	April 15, 2016	New England Black Wolves	Infinite Energy Arena	W 16–9		2,957	6–9
16	April 16, 2016	@ Rochester Knighthawks	Blue Cross Arena	W 17–11		8,570	7–9
17	April 23, 2016	@ New England Black Wolves	Mohegan Sun Arena	L 11–21		4,097	7–10
18	April 30, 2016	Vancouver Stealth	Infinite Energy Arena	W 14–6		5,347	8–10

=== Playoffs ===
Game	Date	Opponent	Location	Score	OT	Attendance	Record
Eastern division semi-final	May 6, 2016	@ New England Black Wolves	Mohegan Sun Arena	L 13–14	OT	3,266	0–1

== Roster ==
Georgia Swarm roster
Active (21-man) roster		Inactive roster	Coaches
Goaltenders: 50 (Canada) Brodie MacDonald; 31 (Canada) Zach Higgins; Defensemen: 27 (Canada) Reid Acton; 85 (United States) Mitch Belisle; 10 (Canada) Alex Crepinsek; 56 (Canada) Drew Petkoff	Forwards: 32 (Canada) Shayne Jackson (A); 19 (Canada) Jesse King; 46 (Canada) Kiel Matisz; 93 (Iroquois) Johnny Powless; 83 (Iroquois) Randy Staats; 22 (Iroquois) Jerome Thompson; 4 (Iroquois) Lyle Thompson; 2 (Iroquois) Miles Thompson; Transition: 33 (United States) David Earl; 24 (Canada) Jordan MacIntosh (C); 45 (Canada) Jason Noble (A); 37 (Canada) Ethan O'Connor; 44 (Canada) Chad Tutton; 11 (United States) Joel White	Practice squad: 61 (Iroquois) Wenster Green (D); 47 (United States) Michael Seidel (D); 35 (United States) Adam Shute (G); 98 (Canada) Sean Young (T)	Head coach {{{Head Coach}}} Legend: * Suspended list; (C) Captain; (A) Alternate captain; updated 2016-05-01; NLL Transactions

== Transactions ==
=== Trades ===
September 28, 2015	To Georgia Swarm 29th overall selection, 2015 entry draft 2nd round selection, 2018 entry draft	To Toronto Rock Mike Grimes; 34th overall selection, 2015 entry draft

=== Entry Draft ===
The 2015 NLL Entry Draft took place on September 28, 2015. The Swarm made the following selections:

Round	Overall	Player	College/Club
1	1	Lyle Thompson	
1	3	Jesse King	
1	5	Chad Tutton	
1	6	Randy Staats	
2	20	Thomas Hoggarth	
3	29	Michael Seidel	
5	43	Nick Ossello	
6	50	Rick Lewis	

== See also ==
- 2016 NLL season
