= Ottawa Black Bears =

NLL professional box lacrosse team

- Sport: Box lacrosse
- Founded: 2024
- Dissolved: 2026
- League: National Lacrosse League
- Team history: New York Riptide 2018–2024; Ottawa Black Bears 2024–2026
- Colours: Black, red, gold, white
- Owner: GF Sports
- Head coach: Dan MacRae
- General manager: Dan MacRae
- Website: ottawablackbears.com

The Ottawa Black Bears (French: Ours Noirs d'Ottawa) were a Canadian professional box lacrosse team based in Ottawa, Ontario, that competed in the National Lacrosse League (NLL). From 2024 to 2026, the team played its home games at Canadian Tire Centre, which is also the home arena of the Ottawa Senators of the National Hockey League. The Black Bears began play in the 2024–25 season and lasted only two seasons without a winning record. After terminating the ownership of the Black Bears by GF Lacrosse after the 2025-2026 season, the NLL announced the club would cease operations.

== History ==
On February 20, 2024, John Rodenburg of CFGO Radio reported that the New York Riptide would be relocating to Ottawa following the conclusion of the 2023–24 season and will play their home games at Canadian Tire Centre for the 2024–25 season. The team cited poor attendance and their eviction from Nassau Coliseum as factors in the move. The next day, NLL commissioner Brett Frood made the official announcement that the Riptide would be relocating to Ottawa and rebranding as the Ottawa Black Bears. This marks the first time professional box lacrosse has been played in Ottawa since 2003, when the Ottawa Rebel played their final season in Canada's capital before relocating to Edmonton and later to Saskatchewan, where they are now known as the Saskatchewan Rush.

In June 2026, ticket holders for the 2026–27 season were informed that the team would not play the upcoming season at the Canadian Tire Centre, and that tickets would be refunded. Later, on June 25, the NLL stated that it had terminated "GF Lacrosse LLC's ownership" of the team, but that it intended to keep the franchise in the Ottawa-Gatineau region. On September 10, the NLL announced that the Black Bears alongside the Philadelphia Wings would cease operations and a combined dispersal draft will occur after the league failed to find a new ownership group to keep the Ottawa based franchise afloat.

== Roster ==
Ottawa Black Bears roster
Active (21-man) roster		Inactive roster	Coaches
Goaltenders: 30 (Canada) Devlin Shanahan; 31 (Canada) Zach Higgins; 86 (Canada) Cameron Dunkerly; Defencemen: 2 (Canada) Luc Magnan; 5 (Canada) Riley Delill; 11 (Canada) Callum Jones; 19 (Canada) Mackenzie Mitchell; 44 (Canada) Matt Marinier; 58 (Canada) Andrew Borgatti; 75 (Canada) Jay Thorimbert; 77 (Canada) Reed Kurtz; 82 (Canada) Justin Robinson	Forwards: 4 (Canada) Dustyn Birkhof; 9 (Canada) Reilly O'Connor (A); 10 (Canada) Rob Hellyer; 25 (Canada) Jacob Dunbar; 28 (Canada) Nathan Grenon; 41 (Canada) Taggart Clark; 43 (Canada) Corson Kealey; 51 (Canada) Jeff Teat (C); 68 (United States) Larson Sundown; 92 (Canada) Connor Kearnan; Transition: 8 (Canada) Kevin Brownell (A); 14 (Canada) Jake Stevens; 15 (Canada) Brent Noseworthy; 16 (Canada) Jacob Gasperetti; 33 (Canada) John LaFontaine; 46 (Canada) Kiel Matisz; 88 (United States) Ron John		Head coach Dan Macrae Legend: * Suspended list; (C) Captain; (A) Alternate captain; NLL Transactions

== All-time record ==
Season	W–L	Finish	Home	Road	GF	GA	Coach	Playoffs
2025	8–10	9th	4–5	4–5	183	202	Dan Ladouceur	Did not qualify
2026	8–10	10th	4–5	4–5	185	203	Dan MacRae	Did not qualify
Total	16–20		8–10	8–10	368	405		

== Head coaching history ==
#	Name	Term	Regular season				Playoffs			
#	Name	Term	GC	W	L	W%	GC	W	L	W%
1	Dan Ladouceur	2025	18	8	10	.444	-	-	-	-
2	Dan MacRae	2026	18	8	10	.444	-	-	-	-

== Draft history ==
=== NLL Entry Draft ===
First Round Selections

- 2024: None
- 2025: None
