= 2016 New England Black Wolves season =

2016 lacrosse season of the New England Black Wolves

2016 New England Black Wolves
- League: NLL
- Division: East
- General Manager: Chris Seinko
- Coach: Glenn Clark
- Arena: Mohegan Sun Arena

The New England Black Wolves are a lacrosse team based in Uncasville, Connecticut playing in the National Lacrosse League (NLL). The 2016 season was the team's second season in the league.

== Regular season ==
=== Current standings ===
East Division
P	Team	GP	W	L	PCT	GB	Home	Road	GF	GA	Diff	GF/GP	GA/GP
1	Buffalo Bandits – xyz	18	13	5	.722	0.0	8–1	5–4	251	214	+37	13.94	11.89
2	New England Black Wolves – x	18	10	8	.556	3.0	6–3	4–5	229	212	+17	12.72	11.78
3	Georgia Swarm – x	18	8	10	.444	5.0	4–5	4–5	238	240	−2	13.22	13.33
4	Rochester Knighthawks	18	7	11	.389	6.0	3–6	4–5	200	215	−15	11.11	11.94
5	Toronto Rock	18	5	13	.278	8.0	4–5	1–8	190	224	−34	10.56	12.44

West Division
P	Team	GP	W	L	PCT	GB	Home	Road	GF	GA	Diff	GF/GP	GA/GP
1	Saskatchewan Rush – xy	18	13	5	.722	0.0	7–2	6–3	233	190	+43	12.94	10.56
2	Colorado Mammoth – x	18	12	6	.667	1.0	8–1	4–5	203	202	+1	11.28	11.22
3	Calgary Roughnecks – x	18	8	10	.444	5.0	5–4	3–6	216	216	−-0	12.00	12.00
4	Vancouver Stealth	18	5	13	.278	8.0	4–5	1–8	198	245	−47	11.00	13.61

x: Clinched playoff berth; c: Clinched playoff berth by crossing over to another division; y: Clinched division; z: Clinched best regular season record; GP: Games Played
W: Wins; L: Losses; GB: Games back; PCT: Win percentage; Home: Record at Home; Road: Record on the Road; GF: Goals scored; GA: Goals allowed
Differential: Difference between goals scored and allowed; GF/GP: Average number of goals scored per game; GA/GP: Average number of goals allowed per game

== Game log ==
Game	Date	Opponent	Location	Score	OT	Attendance	Record
1	January 9, 2016	@ Vancouver Stealth	Langley Events Centre	W 17–7		4,230	1–0
2	January 15, 2016	Calgary Roughnecks	Mohegan Sun Arena	L 8–9		5,589	1–1
3	January 17, 2016	@ Georgia Swarm	Infinite Energy Arena	W 11–6		4,845	2–1
4	January 30, 2016	Buffalo Bandits	Mohegan Sun Arena	W 15–11		3,874	3–1
5	February 6, 2016	@ Buffalo Bandits	First Niagara Center	L 10–12		13,556	3–2
6	February 14, 2016	Toronto Rock	Mohegan Sun Arena	W 17–16	OT	3,512	4–2
7	February 28, 2016	Georgia Swarm	Mohegan Sun Arena	W 16–15		3,744	5–2
8	March 5, 2016	@ Colorado Mammoth	Pepsi Center	L 13–14		15,009	5–3
9	March 12, 2016	@ Rochester Knighthawks	Blue Cross Arena	L 13–17		7,589	5–4
10	March 25, 2016	Rochester Knighthawks	Mohegan Sun Arena	W 16–13		3,604	6–4
11	March 26, 2016	@ Rochester Knighthawks	Blue Cross Arena	W 10–8		7,582	7–4
12	April 2, 2016	Colorado Mammoth	Mohegan Sun Arena	L 10–12		3,554	7–5
13	April 8, 2016	Saskatchewan Rush	Mohegan Sun Arena	W 14–13		2,982	8–5
14	April 9, 2016	@ Toronto Rock	Air Canada Centre	W 14–10		10,128	9–5
15	April 15, 2016	@ Georgia Swarm	Infinite Energy Arena	L 9–16		2,957	9–6
16	April 23, 2016	Georgia Swarm	Mohegan Sun Arena	W 21–11		4,097	10–6
17	April 30, 2016	@ Buffalo Bandits	First Niagara Center	L 7–12		19,070	10–7
18	May 1, 2016	Rochester Knighthawks	Mohegan Sun Arena	L 8–10		2,895	10–8

=== Playoffs ===
Game	Date	Opponent	Location	Score	OT	Attendance	Record
Eastern division semi-final	May 6, 2016	Georgia Swarm	Mohegan Sun Arena	W 14–13	OT	3,266	1–0
Eastern Final (Game 1)	May 16, 2016	Buffalo Bandits	Mohegan Sun Arena	L 10–15		3,697	1–1
Eastern Final (Game 2)	May 21, 2016	@ Buffalo Bandits	First Niagara Center	L 15–20		14,000	1–2

== Roster ==
New England Black Wolves roster
Active (21-man) roster		Inactive roster	Coaches
Goaltenders: 31 (Canada) Tye Belanger; 35 (Canada) Evan Kirk; Defensemen: 39 (Canada) Dan Ball; 71 (Canada) Sheldon Burns; 13 (United States) Brett Manney; 84 (United States) Brian Megill; 96 (Iroquois) Bill O'Brien; 98 (Canada) Jimmy Purves; 44 (Canada) John Ranagan; 7 (Canada) Derek Suddons	Forwards: 27 (United States) Kevin Buchanan; 91 (Canada) Kyle Buchanan; 26 (Iroquois) Brett Bucktooth; 21 (Canada) Kevin Crowley; 8 (Canada) Mike MacDonald; 66 (Canada) Shane MacDonald; 77 (Iroquois) Quinn Powless; 14 (Canada) Pat Saunders; Transition: 20 (United States) Ryan Hotaling	Practice squad: -- (Canada) Brent Adams (D); -- (United States) Matt Crough (F); -- (United States) Josh Johnson (F); Injured reserve: -- (Canada) Andrew Suitor	Head coach {{{Head Coach}}} Legend: * Suspended list; (C) Captain; (A) Alternate captain; Roster updated 2014-09-27; NLL Transactions

== Transactions ==
=== Trades ===
October 12, 2015	To New England Black Wolves Kevin Crowley	To Toronto Rock Dan Lintner; 2nd round selection, 2016 entry draft
October 25, 2015	To New England Black Wolves Tyler Digby; 2nd round selection, 2017 entry draft	To Vancouver Stealth Garrett Billings
October 26, 2015	To New England Black Wolves Shawn Evans; 3rd round selection, 2018 entry draft	To Calgary Roughnecks Tyler Digby; 1st round selection, 2018 entry draft 1st round selection, 2019 entry draft

=== Entry Draft ===
The 2015 NLL Entry Draft took place on September 28, 2015. The Black Wolves made the following selections:

Round	Overall	Player	College/Club
1	8	Dan Lintner	
3	22	Mike MacDonald	
3	28	Philip Caputo	
4	37	Brooker Muir	
5	41	Ryan McSpadyen	
6	48	Jordi Jones-Smith	

== See also ==
- 2016 NLL season
