= Levi Anderson =

Canadian lacrosse player (born 1998)

Personal information
- Born: December 22, 1998 (age 27) Calgary, Alberta, Canada
- Height: 6 ft 4 in (193 cm)
- Weight: 215 lb (98 kg; 15 st 5 lb)

Sport
- Position: Midfielder
- Shoots: Left
- NCAA team: Saint Joseph's
- NLL draft: 12th overall, 2023
- NLL team: Saskatchewan Rush
- PLL team Former teams: New York Atlas; Maryland Whipsnakes
- Pro career: 2024–

Career highlights
- NCAA: USILA All-American (Honorable Mention 2024); All-Atlantic 10 (First-Team 2023, Second-Team 2024); All-NEC (First-Team 2021, Second-Team 2022); Saint Joseph's All-Time Points Leader

Levi Anderson (born December 22, 1998) is a Canadian professional lacrosse player for the New York Atlas of the Premier Lacrosse League and the Saskatchewan Rush of the National Lacrosse League. He played college lacrosse at Saint Joseph's University in Philadelphia, Pennsylvania

== Early life ==
Anderson attended Crescent Heights High School in Calgary, where he ran track. In Juniors, Anderson played a year with the Juniors B Victoria Shamrocks and then the Juniors A Okotoks Raiders. Anderson led the Raiders to the Minto Cup in 2018, where he scored four goals and had five assists in four games.

In 2017, Anderson committed to play college lacrosse for fellow Calgary native Taylor Wray at Saint Joseph's.

== College Career ==
Anderson redshirted his first season on Hawk Hill to adjust to college across the continent and transition from box to field lacrosse.

Anderson made an immediate impact for the Hawks. In his debut against St. Bonaventure, he scored four goals and one assist. On March 12th, the NCAA announced they were canceling all remaining winter and spring sports due to the spreading COVID-19 pandemic. While this cut the season to only seven games, all NCAA athletes were granted an extra year of eligibility to compensate for the lost year. Anderson finished his shortened first season with 24 points, 15 goals and 9 assists.

In his second season, Anderson finished with 20 goals and 27 assists, earning him First-Team all NEC nods. Anderson had a hat-trick against Hobart, including the overtime game-winner.

Anderson broke out in his junior season. He had 64 points (second most in program history) with 32 assists (third most in program history. Anderson led the Hawks to their first NEC title in 2022, scoring two goals and two assists in the title game. The win brought St. Joe's to its first NCAA Tournament in program history. Anderson had a hat-trick in the loss to 4-seeded Yale. Anderson again won NEC honors, this season recognized as a Second-Team all-conference player.

Anderson opened the 2023 season scoring a hat-trick in each of the first three games. In a game against St. John's, Anderson broke the St. Joe's record for goals in a game with 8. On April 15th, Anderson scored his 100th collegiate goal, against Hobart, the Hawks went on to win 11-10. He finished the season with 50 points, 39 goals, 11 assists, earning him First-Team all Atlantic 10 honors. The Hawks lost to High Point in the A10 tournament semifinals, ending Anderson's senior season.

Anderson became the second Hawk to reach 200 career points on April 20th, 2024. In the Atlantic 10 tournament semifinal match against UMass, Anderson passed his teammate, Matt Bohmer, for the all-time points record at St. Joe's. In the Atlantic 10 Championship Game, Anderson had his best game all season, scoring 7 goals and adding 2 assists, defeating Richmond 17-13. He won the tournament's Most Outstanding Player award and Second-Team All-Conference honors in the Atlantic 10. Anderson led the Hawks to their second NCAA Tournament, where they lost to #5 Virginia 17-11.

== PLL Career ==
Anderson was originally drafted by the Chaos in the 2023 PLL Draft, but he chose to return to St. Joe's for his fifth year of eligibility, voiding the Chaos' pick.

In the 2024 PLL Draft, the California Redwoods selected Anderson with the 21st overall pick. The Redwoods traded Anderson to the Maryland Whipsnakes for a 2025 4th-Round pick before the season started.

Anderson debuted for the Maryland Whipsnakes on June 28th against the New York Atlas. He shot 40%, scoring 2 goals, and adding an assist in his debut. He finished his rookie season with 9 goals and 4 assists. In their 2024 semifinal upset of the 1-seeded Atlas, Anderson had his first career hat-trick, including the overtime winner

On April 14th 2026, Anderson was traded to the New York Atlas for the 32nd Overall Pick, as a part of a draft day trade. Anderson scored a career-high 7 points, including two 2-point goals in his debut, helping the Atlas defeat the Carolina Chaos 16-12.

== NLL Career ==
In the 2023 National Lacrosse League Draft, the Saskatchewan Rush selected Anderson with the 12th overall pick. Anderson was a highly touted prospect, not just at his natural position of forward. Due to his large frame and quickness, Anderson was viewed as a player who could defend and excel in scoring in the transition game.

Anderson made his debut against the Halifax Thunderbirds on December 14th. He scored a goal, an assist, and caused a turnover in the overtime win. He finished the regular season with 5 goals and 8 assists in 6 games. The Rush made it to the NLL Final, where Anderson played in game one, scoring a goal and an assist in the loss to the Buffalo Bandits. The Rush would go on to lose the series, 2 games to 1 to the Bandits.

Anderson had an expanded role with the Rush in his second season, playing 13 games. Anderson scored 9 goals and assisted 16, both sixth on the Rush.
