= Adrian Sorichetti =

Canadian professional lacrosse player (born 1990)

Personal information
- Born: October 8, 1990 (age 36) Whitby, Ontario, Canada
- Height: 6 ft 0 in (183 cm)
- Weight: 200 lb (91 kg; 14 st 4 lb)

Sport
- Position: Transition
- Shoots: Left
- NCAA team: Hoftstra Pride
- NLL draft: 13th overall, 2013; Edmonton Rush
- NLL team: San Diego Seals
- Pro career: 2013–2019

Adrian Sorichetti (born October 8, 1990 in Whitby, Ontario) is a retired Canadian professional box lacrosse player who played for the San Diego Seals and the Saskatchewan Rush of the National Lacrosse League. Adrian was drafted in the second round (13th overall) in the 2013 NLL Entry Draft by the Edmonton Rush. Adrian attended high school at All Saints Catholic Secondary School in Whitby for two years before receiving a hockey and lacrosse scholarship to Trinity Pawling Preparatory School in Pawling, NY. Adrian grew up playing hockey and lacrosse in Whitby, Ontario.

== College career ==
=== Hofstra University ===
2010: CAA All-Rookie Team selection

2012: All-CAA first team selection...Played in 12 games and started 11...Led the team in assists with 14 and points with 38...Ranked sixth in the CAA and 39th in Division I in points per game (3.17)...Tallied 24 goals on the year which ranked second on the team, fifth in the CAA and 41st in Division I in goals average (2.0)...Seven multi-goal games...Recorded career-highs of seven goals, three assists and 10 points against St. John's...It was the most goals by a Pride player since 2003 and the most points since 1989

2013 Preseason All-America second team selection by Inside Lacrosse Face-Off Yearbook...Named to Preseason All-CAA team in the Inside Lacrosse Face-Off Yearbook Coaches Poll...2013 Preseason All-CAA Team selection...

=== NLL ===
Adrian Sorichetti		Regular season									Playoffs								
Season	Team	GP	G	A	Pts	LB	PIM	Pts/GP	LB/GP	PIM/GP	GP	G	A	Pts	LB	PIM	Pts/GP	LB/GP	PIM/GP
2014	Edmonton Rush	4	3	2	5	4	0	1.25	1.00	0.00	0	0	0	0	0	0	0.00	0.00	0.00
2015	Edmonton Rush	15	5	3	8	56	13	0.53	3.73	0.87	5	1	0	1	13	4	0.20	2.60	0.80
2016	Saskatchewan Rush	17	5	6	11	81	11	0.65	4.76	0.65	4	2	2	4	18	5	1.00	4.50	1.25
2017	Saskatchewan Rush	18	10	4	14	65	19	0.78	3.61	1.06	4	0	1	1	13	7	0.25	3.25	1.75
2018	Saskatchewan Rush	18	7	8	15	64	8	0.83	3.56	0.44	4	0	1	1	15	9	0.25	3.75	2.25
2019	San Diego Seals	18	5	6	11	60	21	0.61	3.33	1.17	1	0	0	0	8	0	0.00	8.00	0.00
		90	35	29	64	330	72	0.71	3.67	0.80	18	3	4	7	67	25	0.39	3.72	1.39
Career Total:		108	38	33	71	397	97	0.66	3.68	0.90									

GP–Games played; G–Goals; A–Assists; Pts–Points; LB–Loose balls; PIM–Penalty minutes; Pts/GP–Points per games played; LB/GP–Loose balls per games played; PIM/GP–Penalty minutes per games played.
