= Ben McIntosh =

Canadian lacrosse player (born 1991)

Personal information
- Nationality: Canadian
- Born: May 28, 1991 (age 35) Coquitlam, British Columbia, Canada
- Height: 5 ft 11 in (180 cm)
- Weight: 200 lb (91 kg; 14 st 4 lb)

Sport
- Position: Forward/Transition (Box), Midfield (Field)
- Shoots: Right
- NCAA team: Drexel (2014)
- NLL draft: 1st overall, 2014; Edmonton Rush
- NLL team Former teams: Philadelphia Wings; Edmonton/Saskatchewan Rush
- MLL draft: 62nd overall, 2014; Denver Outlaws
- MLL teams: Charlotte Hounds
- PLL team Former teams: Waterdogs; Archers
- Pro career: 2015–

Career highlights
- 2018 World Lacrosse Championship All World Team; 2018 National Lacrosse League Cup; 2018 Western Lacrosse Association League Champions; 2016 NLL Champion's Cup; 2016 Western Lacrosse Association League Champions; 2015 NLL Champion's Cup; 2015 NLL Rookie of the Year; 2014 NCAA Quarterfinals; 3rd Team Division I All American 2014
Medal record
Representing Canada
Men's field lacrosse
World Lacrosse Championship
Runner-up	2018 Netanya
Men's box lacrosse
World Indoor Lacrosse Championship
Winner	2019 Langley

Ben McIntosh (born May 28, 1991) is a Canadian professional lacrosse player for the Philadelphia Wings in the National Lacrosse League and Waterdogs Lacrosse Club in the Premier Lacrosse League. McIntosh was named to the All World Team at the 2018 World Lacrosse Championship.

== Prep and college career ==
McIntosh prepped at Western Reserve Academy where he was first team All Midwest in lacrosse, and also a well regarded center on their ice hockey team. McIntosh was a teammate of NCAA Goaltender of the Year, Kyle Bernlohr.

At Drexel University, McIntosh was a two time All American and led Drexel to its first ever NCAA tournament appearance as well as the 2014 NCAA Quarterfinals. McIntosh is the single season record holder for goals at Drexel with 48 in 2014.

=== NCAA Statistics ===
		Regular Season
Season	Team	GP	G	A	Pts
2011	Drexel	14	4	3	7
2012	Drexel	15	10	4	14
2013	Drexel	15	38	18	56
2014	Drexel	18	48	17	65
College Totals		62	100	42	142

== Professional career ==
=== NLL career ===
Ben McIntosh was selected first overall in the 2015 National Lacrosse League Entry Draft by the Edmonton Rush who had received the pick in a trade with the Minnesota Swarm. In his rookie season in the National Lacrosse League McIntosh had a tremendous initial season collecting 37 goals, 49 assist and 86 points in his 18 starts with the Rush. McIntosh won 2015 NLL's rookie of the year award with seven first place votes and also helped lead the Rush to its first NLL title. The Rush won the 2016 and 2018 Champion's Cup as well, while reaching the finals in 2017. McIntosh was traded in mid-2020 to the Philadelphia Wings for Josh Currier.

Ben McIntosh		Regular season									Playoffs								
Season	Team	GP	G	A	Pts	LB	PIM	Pts/GP	LB/GP	PIM/GP	GP	G	A	Pts	LB	PIM	Pts/GP	LB/GP	PIM/GP
2015	Edmonton Rush	18	37	49	86	69	10	4.78	3.83	0.56	5	5	8	13	12	0	2.60	2.40	0.00
2016	Saskatchewan Rush	18	36	26	62	89	9	3.44	4.94	0.50	4	10	2	12	13	2	3.00	3.25	0.50
2017	Saskatchewan Rush	17	32	22	54	60	6	3.18	3.53	0.35	4	9	6	15	21	0	3.75	5.25	0.00
2018	Saskatchewan Rush	18	46	34	80	70	17	4.44	3.89	0.94	4	8	10	18	17	0	4.50	4.25	0.00
2019	Saskatchewan Rush	18	41	36	77	65	4	4.28	3.61	0.22	1	3	1	4	6	0	4.00	6.00	0.00
2020	Saskatchewan Rush	10	20	15	35	49	6	3.50	4.90	0.60	–	–	–	–	–	–	–	–	–
2022	Philadelphia Wings	16	31	19	50	60	8	3.13	3.75	0.50	1	0	4	4	3	0	4.00	3.00	0.00
2023	Philadelphia Wings	18	39	34	73	75	6	4.06	4.17	0.33	–	–	–	–	–	–	–	–	–
2024	Philadelphia Wings	18	30	39	69	54	2	3.83	3.00	0.11	–	–	–	–	–	–	–	–	–
		151	312	274	586	591	68	3.88	3.91	0.45	19	35	31	66	72	2	3.47	3.79	0.11
Career Total:		170	347	305	652	663	70	3.84	3.90	0.41									

GP–Games played; G–Goals; A–Assists; Pts–Points; LB–Loose balls; PIM–Penalty minutes; Pts/GP–Points per games played; LB/GP–Loose balls per games played; PIM/GP–Penalty minutes per games played.

Stats reference:

=== WLA career ===
McIntosh was also the first overall selection in the 2013 Western Lacrosse Association draft. He played for the Maple Ridge Burrards. McIntosh won WLA titles with the Burrards in 2016 and 2018.

=== PLL career ===
In 2019, McIntosh started playing for Archers Lacrosse Club in Paul Rabil’s PLL inaugural season. In the 2020 expansion draft, he was picked up by the Waterdogs.

Season	Team	Regular season											Playoffs										
Season	Team	GP	G	2PG	A	Pts	Sh	GB	Pen	PIM	FOW	FOA	GP	G	2PG	A	Pts	Sh	GB	Pen	PIM	FOW	FOA
2019	Archers	10	11	0	2	13	44	7	0	1	0	0	2	1	0	2	3	7	0	0	0	0	0
2020	Waterdogs	5	6	0	0	6	21	3	0	0	0	0	–	–	–	–	–	–	–	–	–	–	–
2021	Waterdogs	4	3	0	0	3	11	3	0	0	0	0	1	0	0	0	0	1	0	0	0	0	0
		19	20	0	2	22	76	13	0	1	0	0	3	1	0	2	3	8	0	0	0	0	0
Career total:		22	21	0	4	25	84	13	0	1	0	0											

GP–Games played; G–Goals; 2PG–2-point goals; A–Assists; Pts–Points; Sh–Shots; GB–Ground balls; Pen–Penalties; PIM–Penalty minutes; FOW–Faceoffs won; FOA–Faceoffs attempted

=== MLL career ===
Ben McIntosh was selected with the sixty second pick in the eighth round by the Denver Outlaws in the 2014 Major League Lacrosse Collegiate Draft. Although being drafted by Denver that year, McIntosh wouldn't make a single appearance that season. The following season a MLL Supplemental Draft was called upon to increase the roster size from 23 to 35. McIntosh was available to be drafted and was by the Chesapeake Bayhawks with the seventy fifth pick of the draft.

== See also ==
- Drexel Dragons men's lacrosse
