= Chad Culp =

Canadian lacrosse player

Personal information
- Nationality: Canadian
- Born: February 5, 1982 Arthur, Ontario
- Height: 5 ft 9 in (175 cm)
- Weight: 185 lb (84 kg; 13 st 3 lb)

Sport
- Position: Forward
- Shoots: Left
- NLL draft: 9th overall, 2002; New York Saints
- NLL teams: Colorado Mammoth; Minnesota Swarm; Arizona Sting; New York Saints; Buffalo Bandits; New England Black Wolves
- Pro career: 2003–2017

Chad Culp (born February 5, 1982, in Arthur, Ontario) is a Canadian lacrosse coach and former player currently serving an assistant coach for the Halifax Thunderbirds of the National Lacrosse League (NLL). He has played for the Buffalo Bandits, Minnesota Swarm New England Black Wolves, Colorado Mammoth, Arizona Sting, and New York Saints.

Chad got married in 2010 in Barrie. He and his wife have a daughter and a son.

== Statistics ==
=== NLL ===
		Regular Season						Playoffs
Season	Team	GP	G	A	Pts	LB	PIM	GP	G	A	Pts	LB	PIM
2003	New York	13	12	14	26	60	21	--	--	--	--	--	--
2004	Arizona	7	3	3	6	13	8	--	--	--	--	--	--
2005	Minnesota	14	18	23	41	87	17	--	--	--	--	--	--
2006	Minnesota	15	20	35	55	69	25	1	1	3	4	6	0
2007	Minnesota	11	13	24	37	29	12	1	1	1	2	2	2
2008	Minnesota	16	23	32	55	89	14	1	0	5	5	2	2
2009	Minnesota	15	12	23	35	87	7	--	--	--	--	--	--
2010	Colorado	13	7	23	30	42	6	--	--	--	--	--	--
2011	Buffalo	15	21	19	40	61	10	2	3	3	6	9	0
NLL totals		119	129	196	325	537	120	5	5	12	17	19	4
