= Jay Thorimbert =

Canadian lacrosse player (born 1986)

Personal information
- Nationality: Canadian
- Born: July 6, 1986 (age 40) Whitby, Ontario, Canada
- Height: 6 ft 0 in (183 cm)
- Weight: 205 lb (93 kg; 14 st 9 lb)

Sport
- Position: Midfield
- Shoots: Right
- NLL draft: 24th overall, 2006; Buffalo Bandits
- NLL team Former teams: Ottawa Black Bears; Boston Blazers; Minnesota Swarm; Buffalo Bandits; New England Black Wolves; Toronto Rock; Rochester Knighthawks; New York Riptide
- MSL team Former teams: Kitchener-Waterloo Kodiaks; St. Regis Indians

Jay Thorimbert (born July 6, 1986) is a Canadian professional box lacrosse player, currently a member of the Ottawa Black Bears of the National Lacrosse League and the Kitchener-Waterloo Kodiaks of Major Series Lacrosse.

He was a member of the Buffalo Bandits in 2007, 2011 and 2012 and the Boston Blazers in 2008. While attending University of Guelph, he was a four-year captain for the lacrosse team. He was a three-time CUFLA All-Canadian, and in 2008, he was a member of the Championship team winning the Begattaway Cup. Thorimbert was named the 2008 CUFLA Most Valuable Player along with Most Valuable Midfield.

Thorimbert played junior lacrosse in the Ontario Lacrosse Association for the Niagara Thunderhawks (Jr. B) and Akwesasne Indians (Jr. A). He played in Major Series Lacrosse for the St. Regis Indians in 2008 and then traded to the Kitchener-Waterloo Kodiaks in 2009.

== Statistics ==
=== NLL ===
Jay Thorimbert		Regular season									Playoffs								
Season	Team	GP	G	A	Pts	LB	PIM	Pts/GP	LB/GP	PIM/GP	GP	G	A	Pts	LB	PIM	Pts/GP	LB/GP	PIM/GP
2009	Boston Blazers	15	5	7	12	84	0	0.80	5.60	0.00	1	0	0	0	5	0	0.00	5.00	0.00
2010	Minnesota Swarm	15	8	6	14	152	9	0.93	10.13	0.60	1	0	1	1	11	2	1.00	11.00	2.00
2011	Buffalo Bandits	14	1	5	6	81	0	0.43	5.79	0.00	2	0	0	0	5	0	0.00	2.50	0.00
2012	Buffalo Bandits	9	2	2	4	73	2	0.44	8.11	0.22	1	0	0	0	3	0	0.00	3.00	0.00
2013	Buffalo Bandits	16	2	10	12	180	4	0.75	11.25	0.25	–	–	–	–	–	–	–	–	–
2014	Buffalo Bandits	18	5	6	11	191	6	0.61	10.61	0.33	3	0	1	1	41	0	0.33	13.67	0.00
2015	Buffalo Bandits	18	7	6	13	246	14	0.72	13.67	0.78	1	0	0	0	14	0	0.00	14.00	0.00
2016	Buffalo Bandits	17	1	6	7	129	7	0.41	7.59	0.41	4	1	2	3	41	0	0.75	10.25	0.00
2017	New England Black Wolves	18	7	8	15	192	9	0.83	10.67	0.50	1	1	1	2	12	0	2.00	12.00	0.00
2018	New England Black Wolves	18	1	6	7	136	2	0.39	7.56	0.11	1	0	0	0	2	0	0.00	2.00	0.00
2019	Toronto Rock	16	1	4	5	105	0	0.31	6.56	0.00	–	–	–	–	–	–	–	–	–
2020	Rochester Knighthawks	6	1	0	1	36	0	0.17	6.00	0.00	–	–	–	–	–	–	–	–	–
2022	New York Riptide	18	3	3	6	104	10	0.33	5.78	0.56	–	–	–	–	–	–	–	–	–
2023	New York Riptide	16	2	4	6	113	6	0.38	7.06	0.38	–	–	–	–	–	–	–	–	–
2024	New York Riptide	17	4	1	5	108	4	0.29	6.35	0.24	–	–	–	–	–	–	–	–	–
		231	50	74	124	1,930	73	0.54	8.35	0.32	15	2	5	7	134	2	0.47	8.93	0.13
Career Total:		246	52	79	131	2,064	75	0.53	8.39	0.30									

GP–Games played; G–Goals; A–Assists; Pts–Points; LB–Loose balls; PIM–Penalty minutes; Pts/GP–Points per games played; LB/GP–Loose balls per games played; PIM/GP–Penalty minutes per games played.
