= John LaFontaine =

Canadian lacrosse player

Personal information
- Born: May 15, 1990 (age 36) Whitby, Ontario, Canada
- Height: 6 ft 2 in (188 cm)
- Weight: 205 lb (93 kg; 14 st 9 lb)

Sport
- Position: Transition
- Shoots: Right
- NLL draft: 28th overall, 2010; Edmonton Rush
- NLL team Former teams: Ottawa Black Bears; New York Riptide; Albany FireWolves; New England Black Wolves; Saskatchewan Rush; Edmonton Rush
- Pro career: 2011–

John LaFontaine (born May 15, 1990) is a Canadian professional box lacrosse player currently playing for the Ottawa Black Bears of the National Lacrosse League. LaFontaine was drafted in the third round (28th overall) in the 2010 NLL Entry Draft by the Edmonton Rush.

== Statistics ==
=== NLL ===
		Regular Season						Playoffs
Season	Team	GP	G	A	Pts	LB	PIM	GP	G	A	Pts	LB	PIM
2011	Edmonton	11	6	1	7	23	2	--	--	--	--	--	--
2012	Edmonton	16	3	7	10	31	6	3	1	4	5	7	0
2013	Edmonton	16	3	9	12	39	19	1	1	0	1	1	0
2014	Edmonton	18	2	5	7	35	6	3	1	1	2	7	0
2015	Edmonton	9	1	6	7	22	6	5	0	1	1	10	0
2016	Saskatchewan	13	2	6	8	34	0	4	1	1	2	13	2
2017	Saskatchewan	15	1	4	5	39	0	2	0	0	0	11	0
2018	New England	18	5	5	10	61	7	1	0	0	0	4	0
2019	New England	15	1	5	6	42	0	1	0	0	0	2	0
2020	New England	11	1	4	5	37	4	--	--	--	--	--	--
2022	Albany	18	1	7	8	74	4	1	0	0	0	4	0
2023	Albany	17	4	10	14	91	6	--	--	--	--	--	--
2024	New York	18	1	6	7	52	5	--	--	--	--	--	--
NLL totals		195	31	75	106	580	65	21	4	7	11	59	2
