= Aaron Bold =

Canadian professional lacrosse player

Personal information
- Nickname: Boldy
- Nationality: Canadian
- Born: April 22, 1985 (age 41) Victoria, British Columbia, Canada
- Height: 6 ft 2 in (188 cm)
- Weight: 207 lb (94 kg; 14 st 11 lb)

Sport
- Position: Goaltender
- NLL draft: 29th overall, 2005; Portland Lumberjax
- NLL team Former teams: Halifax Thunderbirds; San Jose Stealth; Portland Lumberjax; Rochester Knighthawks; Saskatchewan Rush; New England Black Wolves
- Pro career: 2006–

Aaron Bold (born April 22, 1985) is a Canadian professional box lacrosse goaltender for the Vancouver Warriors of the National Lacrosse League. Bold was drafted in the third round (29th overall) of the 2005 National Lacrosse League entry draft by the Portland Lumberjax.

Bold was named Defensive Player of the Week for his performance in the Stealth's 12–7 win at New York in week 6 of the 2008 NLL season.

== Statistics ==
=== NLL ===
		Regular Season						Playoffs
Season	Team	GP	Min	GA	Sv	GAA	Sv %	GP	Min	GA	Sv	GAA	Sv %
2006	Portland	3	45	8	30	10.61	.790	--	--	--	--	--	--
2007	San Jose	13	158	32	110	12.13	.775	2	16	3	12	11.56	.800
2008	San Jose	16	139	21	87	9.05	.806	--	--	--	--	--	--
2009	San Jose	7	102	27	63	15.86	.700	--	--	--	--	--	--
2010	Rochester	16	313	58	201	11.12	.776	--	--	--	--	--	--
2011	Rochester	16	32	6	18	11.42	.750	--	--	--	--	-	--
2012	Edmonton	16	951	166	571	10.47	.775	3	179	23	104	7.69	.819
2013	Edmonton	16	858	151	439	10.56	.744	1	60	12	36	12.00	.750
2014	Edmonton	17	1011	147	558	8.73	.791	3	131	27	63	12.39	.700
2015	Edmonton	17	1017	160	565	9.44	.779	5	249	39	143	9.39	.786
2016	Saskatchewan	18	1042	179	570	10.30	.779	4	240	38	164	9.50	.812
2017	Saskatchewan	17	935	175	565	11.22	.764	--	--	--	--	--	--
NLL totals		177	6598	1134	3779	10.94	.767	22	993	161	585	5.98	.494
