= Mitchell Jones =

Canadian lacrosse player (born 1991)

Personal information
- Nationality: Canadian
- Born: December 12, 1991 (age 34) Delta, British Columbia, Canada
- Height: 6 ft 3 in (191 cm)
- Weight: 215 lb (98 kg; 15 st 5 lb)

Sport
- Position: Forward
- Shoots: Left
- NLL draft: 21st overall, 2012; Washington Stealth
- NLL team Former teams: Philadelphia Wings; Vancouver Warriors; Washington Stealth; Buffalo Bandits
- WLA team: New Westminster Salmonbellies
- Pro career: 2013–

Mitchell Jones (born December 12, 1991, in Delta, British Columbia) is a Canadian professional lacrosse player for the Philadelphia Wings of the National Lacrosse League (NLL). Jones also played for the Chrome Lacrosse Club of the Premier Lacrosse League.

== Junior and Major ==
Jones began his amateur career with the Delta Jr. A Islanders of the BC Junior A Lacrosse League in 2007. He played for the Brampton Excelsiors Jr. A of the Ontario Junior A Lacrosse League for the 2010 and 2011 seasons. In 2012, Jones played for the Orangeville Northmen Jr. A and was a key player in the club's Minto Cup championship run. Jones amassed 67 points in 11 regular season games and went on to finish third in the Minto Cup tournament scoring, finishing with 21 points over 4 games. In 2013, Jones signed with the Victoria Shamrocks of the Western Lacrosse Association (WLA) and won the Mann Cup in 2015. The following season Jones was traded to the New Westminster Salmonbellies for several draft picks. Jones holds a Canadian Lacrosse record for ”Most points in a Minto Cup finals game (13)."

== National Lacrosse League ==
Jones was drafted in the third round (21st overall) of the 2012 NLL Entry Draft by the Washington Stealth, and played three games in his rookie year. In 2013, Jones was dealt to the Buffalo Bandits in exchange for several draft picks. Jones had his first breakout season in the National Lacrosse League in 2016, tallying 33 points over 17 games. The following season, Jones had his best season with 69 points. On November 28, 2018, Jones was traded from the Buffalo Bandits to the Vancouver Warriors in exchange for Corey Small.

== Premier Lacrosse League ==
On October 22, 2018, it was announced that Jones was joining the Premier Lacrosse League for the summer 2019 season. On March 4, 2019, it was announced that Jones was joining the Chrome Lacrosse Club.

== Statistics ==
=== NLL ===
Mitchell Jones		Regular season									Playoffs								
Season	Team	GP	G	A	Pts	LB	PIM	Pts/GP	LB/GP	PIM/GP	GP	G	A	Pts	LB	PIM	Pts/GP	LB/GP	PIM/GP
2013	Washington Stealth	3	1	3	4	1	0	1.33	0.33	0.00	–	–	–	–	–	–	–	–	–
2014	Buffalo Bandits	4	2	3	5	22	4	1.25	5.50	1.00	–	–	–	–	–	–	–	–	–
2015	Buffalo Bandits	3	8	3	11	16	0	3.67	5.33	0.00	1	0	2	2	3	0	2.00	3.00	0.00
2016	Buffalo Bandits	17	11	22	33	119	4	1.94	7.00	0.24	4	5	2	7	25	0	1.75	6.25	0.00
2017	Buffalo Bandits	18	31	38	69	93	2	3.83	5.17	0.11	–	–	–	–	–	–	–	–	–
		45	53	69	122	251	10	2.71	5.58	0.22	5	5	4	9	28	0	1.80	5.60	0.00
Career Total:		50	58	73	131	279	10	2.62	5.58	0.20									

GP–Games played; G–Goals; A–Assists; Pts–Points; LB–Loose balls; PIM–Penalty minutes; Pts/GP–Points per games played; LB/GP–Loose balls per games played; PIM/GP–Penalty minutes per games played.
