= New England Black Wolves =

NLL professional box lacrosse team

- Sport: Lacrosse
- Founded: 2015
- Dissolved: 2020
- League: National Lacrosse League
- Division: East
- Based in: Uncasville, Connecticut
- Arena: Mohegan Sun Arena
- Colors: Black, Orange, White
- Head coach: Glenn Clark
- General manager: Rich Lisk
- Division titles: 1 (2020)
- Playoff berths: 4 (2016, 2017, 2018, 2019)
- Website: www.blackwolves.com

The New England Black Wolves were a professional box lacrosse team based in Uncasville, Connecticut. They were members of the East Division of the National Lacrosse League and began play in the winter of 2014–2015 at the Mohegan Sun Arena in Uncasville. The team was partially owned by the Mohegan Tribe of Indians of Connecticut, partially owned by Ted Goldthorpe, and partially owned by Brad Brewster.

The Black Wolves relocated from Philadelphia, Pennsylvania, where they were known as the Philadelphia Wings from 1987 to 2014 and won 6 championships.

On February 22, 2021, the team was reported to have been sold and was relocated to Albany, New York, to play out of the MVP Arena as the Albany FireWolves.

== History ==
The Black Wolves won their first game at home on January 2, 2015 against the Buffalo Bandits in front of just under 6,000 fans. Kyle Buchanan scored the first ever goal for the Black Wolves in New England's 12-8 win. The team would finish with a record of 4-14 in its inaugural season. With a new coach behind the bench, the Black Wolves would bounce back and have a much improved 2016 season, which led them to a 10-8 record and playoff run that ended to the Bandits in the East Division final.

The Black Wolves' third year was not as successful as their second, as they fell to a 8-10 record and lost in the East Division semi-final. The Black Wolves continued to struggle in the regular season and playoffs, as in 2018 and 2019 they finished with a 9-9 record and a first round exit in the playoffs in each of those seasons.

2020 appeared to be a different season for the Black Wolves with the emergence of Doug Jamieson as a legitimate starting goalie and forward Callum Crawford. Having an MVP caliber season, the Black Wolves seemed poised for a deep playoff run and potentially a championship. However, with the onset of the COVID-19 pandemic, the NLL cancelled the rest of the season.

After struggling with attendance at the end of the season, it was announced that the New England Black Wolves franchise would move to Albany and rebrand as the Albany FireWolves. The franchise finished with one main notable achievement as a team and it was being declared the East Division Champions in 2020 after the stoppage of the season.

== Final roster ==
New England Black Wolves roster
Active (21-man) roster		Inactive roster	Coaches
Goaltenders: 30 (Canada) Doug Jamieson; 35 (Canada) Ethan Woods; Defensemen: 10 (Haudenosaunee) Adam Bomberry; 22 (Canada) Nick Chaykowsky; 8 (United States) Greg Downing; 19 (Haudenosaunee) Ty Logan; 13 (United States) Brett Manney (C); 21 (Canada) Mackenzie Mitchell; 91 (United States) Joe Nardella; 26 (Canada) Jackson Nishimura; 62 (Canada) Creighton Reid	Forwards: 98 (Canada) Callum Crawford; 78 (Canada) Jordan Durston; 14 (United States) Dave Emala; 42 (Canada) Andrew Kew; 86 (Canada) Stephan Leblanc (A); 9 (Canada) Reilly O'Connor; 44 (Canada) Tanner Thomson; 15 (United States) Joe Resetarits; Transition: 33 (Canada) John LaFontaine (A); 4 (Canada) Anthony Malcom; 17 (Canada) Colton Watkinson	Practice squad: 27 (Canada) Bailey Brown; 21 (Canada) Mike Byrne; 55 (Canada) Joel Tinney	Head coach: Glenn Clark; Assistant coaches: Darryl Gibson; Clem O'Drasio; Legend: * Suspended list; (C) Captain; (A) Alternate captain; Roster updated 2019-09-18; NLL Transactions

== All-time record ==
Season	Division	W–L	Finish	Home	Road	GF	GA	Coach	Playoffs
2015	Eastern	4–14	5th	2–7	2–7	186	249	Blane Harrison	Did not qualify
2016	Eastern	10–8	2nd	6–3	4–5	229	212	Glenn Clark	Lost East Division Final
2017	Eastern	8–10	3rd	5–4	3–6	220	244	Glenn Clark	Lost East Division Semi-final
2018	Eastern	9–9	3rd	4–5	5–4	194	242	Glenn Clark	Lost East Division Semi-final
2019	Eastern	9–9	4th	7–2	2–7	213	223	Glenn Clark	Lost East Division Semi-final
2020	Eastern	8–3	1st	4–3	4–0	135	101	Glenn Clark	No playoffs held
Total	6 Seasons	48-53		28-24	20–29	1,177	1,271		
Playoff totals	4 Appearances	1-5		1–1	0–4	66	94		0 championship

== Playoff results ==
Season	Game	Visiting	Home
2016	East Division Semi-finals	Georgia 13	New England 14 OT
2016	East Division Finals Game 1	Buffalo 15	New England 10
2016	East Division Finals Game 2	New England 15	Buffalo 20
2017	East Division Semi-finals	New England 10	Toronto 18
2018	East Division Semi-finals	New England 11	Rochester 15
2019	East Division Semi-finals	New England 6	Buffalo 13

== Draft history ==
=== NLL entry draft ===
First-round selections

- 2014: Mark Cockerton (4th overall), Quinn Powless (8th overall)
- 2015: Dan Lintner (8th overall)
- 2016: Seth Oakes (8th overall)
- 2017: Colton Watkinson (7th overall), Anthony Joaquim (8th overall), JP Kealey (10th overall)
- 2018: None
- 2019: Andrew Kew (3rd overall), Zach Goodrich (17th overall)
- 2020: None

== Head coaching history ==
Note: This list does not include head coaches from the Philadelphia Wings.

#	Name	Term	Regular season				Playoffs			
#	Name	Term	GC	W	L	W%	GC	W	L	W%
1	Blaine Harrison	2015	18	4	14	.222	—	—	—	—
2	Glenn Clark	2016-2020	83	44	39	.530	5	1	4	.200
