= Saskatchewan Rush =

NLL professional box lacrosse team

- Sport: Box lacrosse
- First season: 2016
- League: National Lacrosse League
- Team history: Edmonton Rush (2005–2015); Ottawa Rebel (2001–2003); Syracuse Smash (1998–2000)
- Location: Saskatoon, Saskatchewan
- Arena: SaskTel Centre
- Colours: Green, Black, White
- Owner: Priestner Sports Corporation
- Head coach: Jimmy Quinlan
- General manager: Derek Keenan
- Championships: 2 (2016, 2018)
- Division titles: 5 (2016, 2017, 2018, 2019, 2020)
- Local media: CKBL-FM
- Website: saskrush.com

The Saskatchewan Rush are a Canadian professional box lacrosse team based in Saskatoon, Saskatchewan, that competes in the National Lacrosse League (NLL). The team plays its home games at SaskTel Centre. Formerly the Edmonton Rush, the team has won the NLL championship twice since their move to Saskatchewan, in 2016 and 2018.

== History ==
=== Franchise relocations ===
The Rush franchise has a long history in the NLL, a league historically known for frequent expansion and relocations. Founded in the late 1990s in New York as the Syracuse Smash, the last-place team was bought and moved, and became the Ottawa Rebel in time for the 2001 season. The perennially-struggling franchise became inactive after 2003, and in 2005 was bought by Bruce Urban and relocated to Alberta, becoming the Edmonton Rush. The Rush turned things around on the field, twice claiming West Division titles and twice making it to the NLL Championship, winning the league title in what would be their final season in Edmonton in 2015. However, as the team's existing arena lease came to an end in 2015, it became clear that year that despite successful play another relocation was possible and that Saskatoon was a likely candidate. In Edmonton, the team had struggled to consistently draw fans, facing competition from the Edmonton Oil Kings junior hockey team, and were denied the ability to promote the Rush branding within Rexall Place by the Edmonton Oilers. Lacking any agreement with the City of Edmonton to play at its new arena, Rogers Place, Urban opted to relocate for the 2016 season. The move to Saskatoon brought the city its first professional sports team in decades, and the Rush joined the CFL's Saskatchewan Roughriders as a second professional team in the province. The new team would open their inaugural season as defending NLL champions. Derek Keenan, who became coach and manager of the Rush in 2010, made the move to continue those roles in Saskatchewan.

=== Immediate success ===
After the move to Saskatoon, the Rush managed to keep their on-field success going. In their inaugural season, Saskatchewan finished atop the West Division with a 13–5 record and advanced to the championship final, where they faced the Buffalo Bandits. The Rush won back-to-back games in the best-of-three series, clinching a second-consecutive championship–and their first in Saskatchewan–with a last-minute 11–10 victory at SaskTel Centre on 4 June 2016. Goalie Aaron Bold was named Champion's Cup Most-Valuable-Player. In addition to their success on the field, the Rush were a success at the gate, regularly drawing sell-out crowds. The team held a championship rally in downtown Saskatoon on 7 June.

In 2017, the team reached a new sponsorship deal with Saskatoon Co-op, under which the team's venue is referred to as "Co-op Field at SaskTel Centre" during Rush games.

The Rush again topped the West Division in 2017, and returned to the Championship Final, this time facing the Georgia Swarm. After losing the first game of the series, the Rush led game 2 14–13 before the Swarm tied the game in the dying seconds and won in overtime, denying the Rush a third-consecutive title. However, the Rush returned to the final for a fourth-straight season in 2018 after again winning the West Division. In the championship final, they defeated the Rochester Knighthawks 15–10 in the series-deciding third game to secure a third title in four years, winning the inaugural National Lacrosse League Cup, which replaced the Champion's Cup that season. Jeff Shattler, who scored four goals in the final match, was named MVP.

Saskatchewan posted the best record in the West for a fourth-straight season in 2019, but lost the West Division playoff semi-final to the Colorado Mammoth, dropping the match 11–10 in overtime at SaskTel Centre, and thus failing to advance to the championship final for the first time since relocating to Saskatoon. During the 2020 season, the Rush were leading the West Division with a 7–3 record when the season was paused due to the COVID-19 pandemic; the season was ultimately cut-short, and the playoffs and 2021 season were cancelled.

After the cancellation of the 2020 season, Keenan announced that he was stepping aside as coach after eight years, although he stayed on as manager and promoted former assistant Jeff McComb to the head coach position. Keenan left the coaching ranks as the NLL's all-time leader in coaching wins with 155.

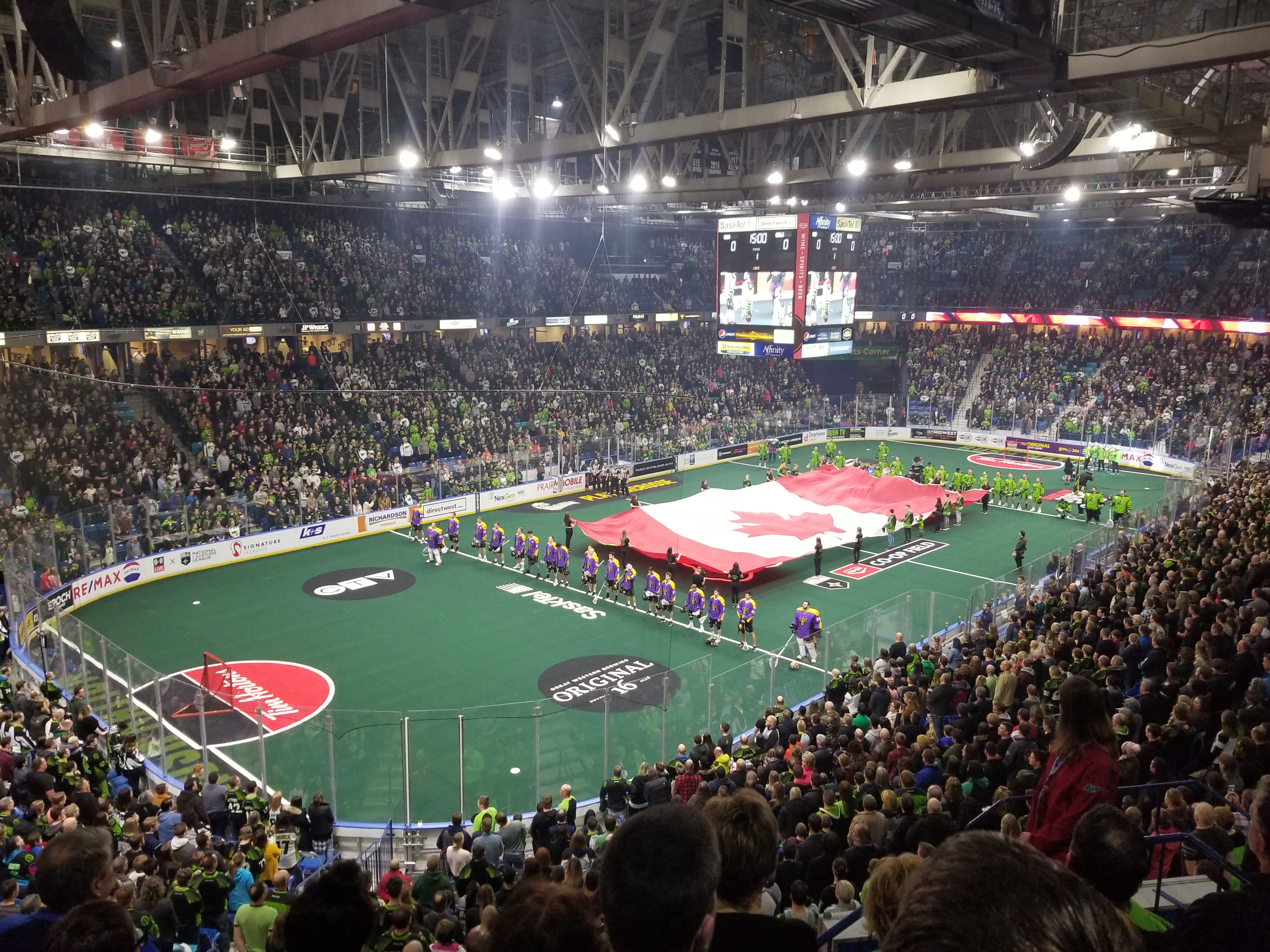
The Rush and San Diego Seals before a game at SaskTel Centre in January 2019

=== New ownership ===
In May 2021, the team was bought by Mike and Colin Priestner of Priestner Sports Corporation, who had previously purchased the Saskatoon Blades of the Western Hockey League, the other major tenant of the SaskTel Centre, in 2013.

When NLL play resumed in 2022, the Rush struggled to regain their previous form. After a 4–10 start to the season, the team fired McComb as coach, with Keenan and assistant coach Jimmy Quinlan taking over as associate coaches for the remainder of the year. Despite winning their final four games, the Rush went on to miss the playoffs for the first time since moving to Saskatoon with an 8–10 record. After the season, Quinlan was named the new head coach. The Rush went 8–10 again in the 2023 season, missing the playoffs for a second straight year.

== All-time record ==
| = Indicates League Championship |

| Season | Division/Conference (Note: Conference play began in the 2022 season) | W–L | Finish | Home | Road | GF | GA | Coach | Playoffs | Avg Attendance |
|---|---|---|---|---|---|---|---|---|---|---|
| 2016 | Western | 13–5 | 1st | 7–2 | 6–3 | 233 | 190 | Derek Keenan | Won NLL championship | 11,736 |
| 2017 | Western | 12–6 | 1st | 8–1 | 4–5 | 231 | 212 | Derek Keenan | Lost NLL Finals | 14,921 |
| 2018 | Western | 14–4 | 1st | 6–3 | 8–1 | 254 | 196 | Derek Keenan | Won NLL championship | 14,639 |
| 2019 | Western | 11–7 | 1st | 7–2 | 4–5 | 222 | 202 | Derek Keenan | Lost Division Semi-finals | 13,459 |
| 2020 | Western | 7–3* | 1st | 2–3 | 5–0 | 111 | 93 | Derek Keenan | NLL playoffs cancelled | 12,007 |
| 2021 | Western | Season cancelled due to COVID-19 pandemic | | | | | | | | |
| 2022 | Western | 8–10 | 4th | 6–3 | 2–7 | 196 | 194 | Jeff McComb / Derek Keenan & Jimmy Quinlan** | Did not qualify | 8,743 |
| 2023 | Western | 8–10 | 5th | 5–4 | 3–6 | 204 | 212 | Jimmy Quinlan | Did not qualify | 8,606 |
| 2024 | Unified | 8–10 | 10th | 4–5 | 4–5 | 217 | 210 | Jimmy Quinlan | Did not qualify | 8,085 |
| 2025 | Unified | 13–5 | 2nd | 6–3 | 7–2 | 213 | 179 | Jimmy Quinlan | Lost NLL Finals | 6,571 |
| 2026 | Unified | 12–6 | 3rd | 7–2 | 5–4 | 206 | 176 | Jimmy Quinlan | Lost Quarterfinals | 6,475 |
| Total | 10 seasons | 106–66 | | 58–28 | 48–38 | 2,087 | 1,864 | | | 10,477 |
| Playoff totals | 6 appearances | 13–7 | | 9–3 | 4–4 | 250 | 224 | | 2 championships | 11,534 |

*2020 season ended in March 2020 because of COVID-19
**Before the 2022 season Derek Keenan stepped down as head coach. New hire Jeff McComb would go on to be fired mid-season. General Manager Derek Keenan and Offensive Coach Jimmy Quinlan became associate head coaches.

== Playoff results ==
| Season | Game | Visiting | Home |
|---|---|---|---|
| 2016 | West Division Finals Game 1 | Saskatchewan 16 | Calgary 10 |
| 2016 | West Division Finals Game 2 | Calgary 9 | Saskatchewan 12 |
| 2016 | NLL championship game 1 | Saskatchewan 11 | Buffalo 9 |
| 2016 | NLL championship game 2 | Buffalo 10 | Saskatchewan 11 |
| 2017 | West Division Finals Game 1 | Saskatchewan 18 | Colorado 9 |
| 2017 | West Division Finals Game 2 | Colorado 10 | Saskatchewan 11 |
| 2017 | NLL Finals Game 1 | Saskatchewan 14 | Georgia 18 |
| 2017 | NLL Finals Game 2 | Georgia 15 (OT) | Saskatchewan 14 |
| 2018 | West Division Finals | Calgary 13 | Saskatchewan 15 |
| 2018 | NLL Finals Game 1 | Rochester 9 | Saskatchewan 16 |
| 2018 | NLL Finals Game 2 | Saskatchewan 8 | Rochester 13 |
| 2018 | NLL Finals Game 3 | Rochester 10 | Saskatchewan 15 |
| 2019 | West Division Semi-finals | Colorado 11 (OT) | Saskatchewan 10 |
| 2025 | Quarterfinals | Georgia 9 | Saskatchewan 13 |
| 2025 | Semi Final 1 | Saskatchewan 16 | Halifax 7 |
| 2025 | Semi Final 2 | Halifax 9 | Saskatchewan 10 (OT) |
| 2025 | NLL Finals Game 1 | Saskatchewan 10 | Buffalo 12 |
| 2025 | NLL Finals Game 2 | Buffalo 10 | Saskatchewan 11 |
| 2025 | NLL Finals Game 3 | Saskatchewan 6 | Buffalo 15 |
| 2026 | Quarterfinals | Toronto 16 | Saskatchewan 13 |

== Head coaching history ==
Note: This list does not include head coaches from the Edmonton Rush.

| # | Name | Term | Regular season | | | | Playoffs | | | |
| # | Name | Term | GC | W | L | W% | GC | W | L | W% |
|---|---|---|---|---|---|---|---|---|---|---|
| 1 | Derek Keenan | 2016–2020 | 82 | 57 | 25 | .695 | 13 | 9 | 4 | .692 |
| 2 | Jeff McComb | 2022 | 14 | 4 | 10 | .285 | - | - | - | - |
| 3 | Derek Keenan, Jimmy Quinlan | 2022 | 4 | 4 | 0 | 1.000 | - | - | - | - |
| 4 | Jimmy Quinlan | 2023– | 76 | 45 | 31 | .592 | 6 | 4 | 2 | .667 |

== Draft history ==
The following lists Saskatchewan Rush first-round selections in the NLL Entry Draft.

| Year | Player(s) selected |
|---|---|
| 2015 | No pick |
| 2016 | Ryan Keenan*; Michael Messenger |
| 2017 | No pick |
| 2018 | Connor Robinson |
| 2019 | Holden Garlent; Justin Robinson; Tanner Thomson |
| 2020 | Marshall Powless; Connor McClelland |
| 2021 | Jake Boudreau; Ryan Barnable |
| 2022 | Austin Madronic |
| 2023 | Levi Anderson |
| 2024 | Matt Acchione |
| 2025 | Levi Verch |

*First overall selection

== Team operations ==
=== Branding ===
When the Rush moved to Saskatoon, the team updated the Edmonton Rush branding by changing the colours, replacing silver with green in the logo and on the jerseys. In September 2023, the team launched a new logo designed to connect more with the team's home. The new logo features a bison head. The team unveiled new jerseys alongside the re-brand.

=== Media ===
The Rush reached deals with Saskatoon Media Group's CKBL-FM and SaskTel MaxTV to broadcast its 2016 playoff games. In the subsequent season, the team began to carry radio broadcasts of all games on its sister station CJMK-FM, with Tanner Fetch as play-by-play announcer. The team returned to CKBL-FM for 2018–19 with Dave Thomas as the radio voice of the Rush.

As part of its exclusive broadcast rights to the league in the 2018–19 season, all Rush telecasts moved to the streaming service B/R Live, with Ryan Flaherty on play-by-play, former Vancouver Stealth play-by-play announcer Jake Elliott on colour, and local radio personality Daniella Ponticelli as reporter. As of the 2022 season, TSN carries all Rush games on either television or streaming on TSN+ as part of its national broadcast rights to the NLL.
