= Jeremy Thompson (lacrosse) =

Haudenosaunee lacrosse player (born 1987)

Jeremy Thompson Gaä gwa gye hé
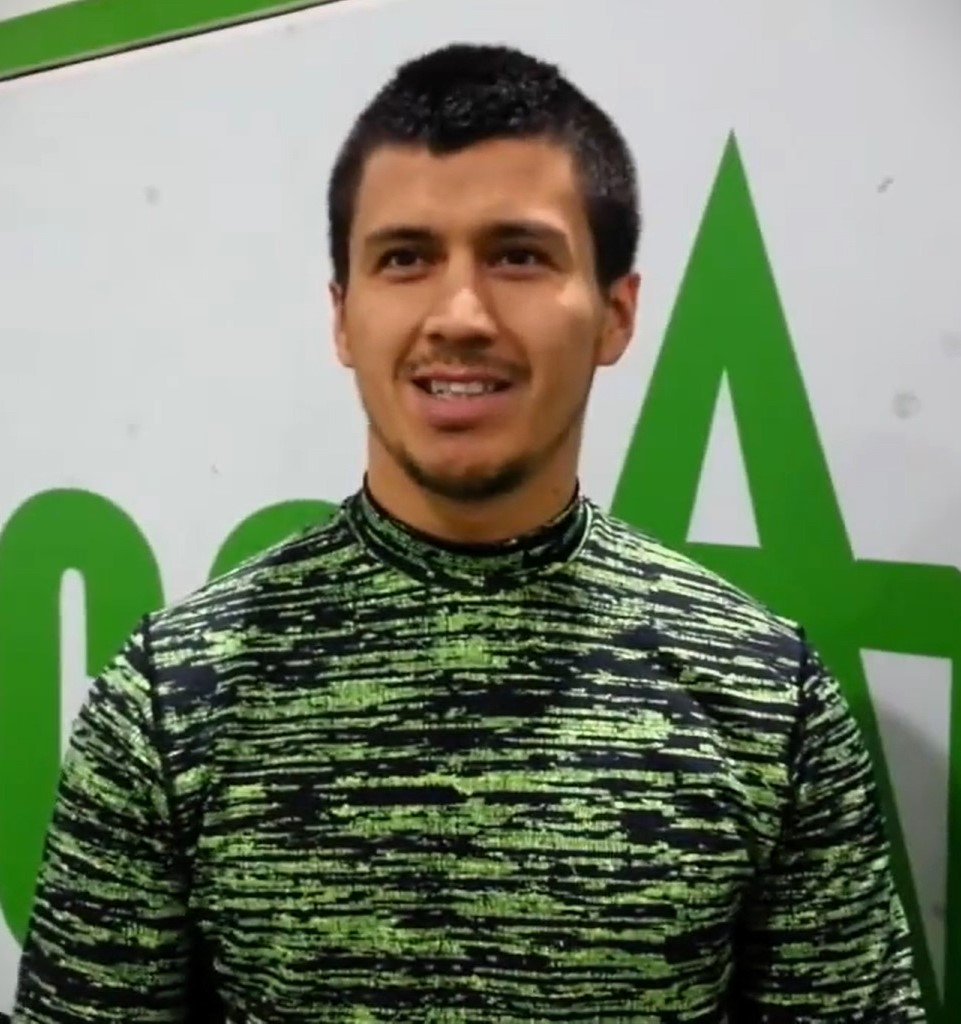
- Thompson in 2015

Personal information
- Nationality: Haudenosaunee
- Born: January 3, 1987 (age 39) Syracuse, New York, U.S.
- Height: 6 ft 0 in (183 cm)
- Weight: 190 lb (86 kg; 13 st 8 lb)

Sport
- Position: Midfield (field), Transition (box)
- Shoots: Right
- NCAA team: Syracuse (2011)
- NLL draft: 9th overall, 2011; Buffalo Bandits
- NLL team Former teams: Georgia Swarm; Buffalo Bandits; Edmonton/Saskatchewan Rush; Panther City Lacrosse Club
- MLL draft: 6th overall, 2011; Hamilton Nationals
- MLL teams: Hamilton Nationals; Rochester Rattlers; Florida Launch; Atlanta Blaze
- PLL team Former teams: New York Atlas; Carolina Chaos
- Pro career: 2011–

Jeremy Thompson (Onondaga: Gaä gwa gye hé; born January 3, 1987 (age 38)) is a Haudenosaunee professional lacrosse player from the Hawk Clan of the Onondaga Nation. He plays for the Georgia Swarm of the National Lacrosse League, and the Atlas of Premier Lacrosse League. He was a two-time Junior College Lacrosse National Champion and was 2nd-team All-American at Syracuse University. Jeremy is also a member of the Haudenosaunee men's national lacrosse team with his brothers.

== Early life ==
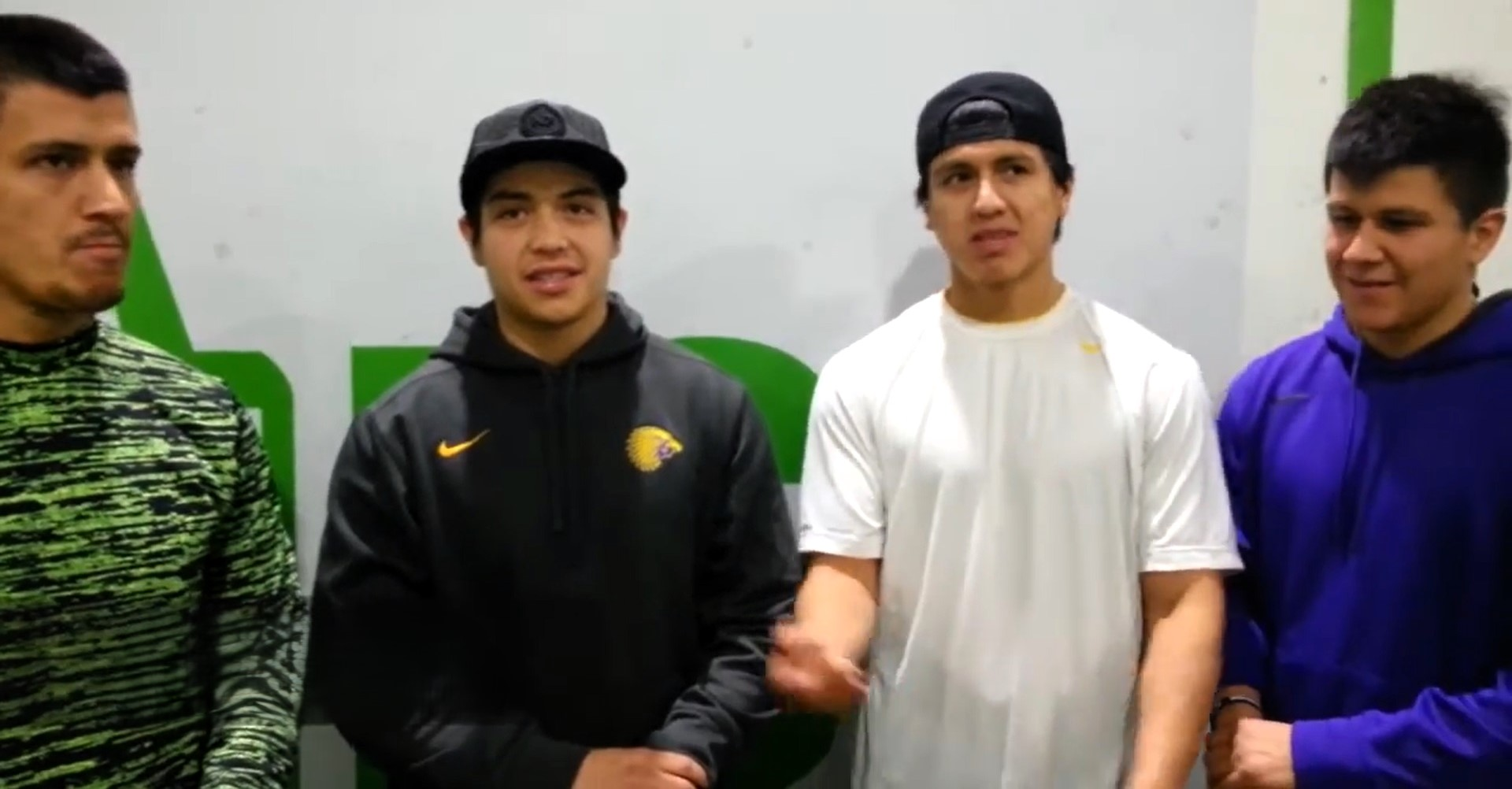
Left to right: Jeremy, Miles, Lyle, and Jerome "Hiana" Thompson in 2015

Jeremy grew up in the Onondaga Nation, NY, and was one of five children of Doloris, an Onondaga mother, and Jerome Thompson, a Mohawk father from Akwesasne. Jeremy and his brothers, Jerome (Hiana), Miles, and Lyle, began playing lacrosse at a very young age due to the spiritual and cultural significance lacrosse has in the Native American community. He attended LaFayette High School outside Syracuse, New York, where he led them to two state championships and became an Under Armour and US Lacrosse All-American.

== College ==
After high school, Jeremy Thompson went on to attend Onondaga Community College. While he was there, Jeremy helped them win two NJCAA national championships, two Mid-State Conference championships, as well as two Region III championships. In his two seasons at OCC, the Lazers went 31–0 with two undefeated national championship seasons. After his time in Junior College, he attended Syracuse University, nearby to his hometown of Nedrow, NY. His first season at Syracuse, he was a USILA Second Team All-American and was All Big East. His senior season he was Third Team All-American as well as All Big East for the second straight year. His brothers Miles and Lyle both played lacrosse at the University of Albany with their cousin Ty Thompson. His other brother Jerome (Haina) played with him at Onondaga Community College.

== Professional career ==
Jeremy Thompson currently plays in both the National Lacrosse League and Premier Lacrosse League. In the NLL, he plays for the Georgia Swarm and in PLL, he plays for the Atlas. He started his MLL career on the Florida Launch but was traded with his brother Lyle Thompson to the Chesapeake Bayhawks on March 3, 2017. He signed with the Atlas on June 16 from the waiver wire after playing for the Chaos in the inaugural PLL season.

Thompson has previously played with the Buffalo Bandits, Edmonton Rush, Saskatchewan Rush and Panther City Lacrosse Club. Prior to the 2023 NLL season, he was traded to the Georgia Swarm. This will be the first time he is playing his brothers Lyle and Miles on the same team in the NLL. They previously played together for the Florida Launch in the MLL. Their brother Hiana currently plays for the Albany FireWolves, but has also previously played for the Georgia Swarm with Lyle and Miles.

=== MLL ===
Season	Team	Regular season											Playoffs										
Season	Team	GP	G	2PG	A	Pts	Sh	GB	Pen	PIM	FOW	FOA	GP	G	2PG	A	Pts	Sh	GB	Pen	PIM	FOW	FOA
2011	Hamilton Nationals	7	6	0	4	10	24	4	0	1	0	2	2	1	0	0	1	6	1	0	0	0	1
2012	Hamilton Nationals	9	5	0	1	6	25	5	0	0.5	0	1	–	–	–	–	–	–	–	–	–	–	–
2013	Hamilton Nationals	11	6	0	2	8	22	16	0	3	0	1	1	0	0	0	0	1	0	0	0	0	0
2015	Rochester Rattlers	3	1	0	0	1	4	10	0	1.5	0	3	–	–	–	–	–	–	–	–	–	–	–
2016	Florida Launch	2	1	0	0	1	6	3	0	0	0	0	–	–	–	–	–	–	–	–	–	–	–
2017	Atlanta Blaze	2	0	0	0	0	3	3	0	0	2	2	–	–	–	–	–	–	–	–	–	–	–
		34	19	0	7	26	84	41	0	6	2	9	3	1	0	0	1	7	1	0	0	0	1
Career total:		37	20	0	7	27	91	42	0	6	2	10											

GP–Games played; G–Goals; 2PG–2-point goals; A–Assists; Pts–Points; Sh–Shots; GB–Ground balls; Pen–Penalties; PIM–Penalty minutes; FOW–Faceoffs won; FOA–Faceoffs attempted

=== PLL ===
Season	Team	Regular season											Playoffs										
Season	Team	GP	G	2PG	A	Pts	Sh	GB	Pen	PIM	FOW	FOA	GP	G	2PG	A	Pts	Sh	GB	Pen	PIM	FOW	FOA
2019	Chaos	4	0	0	0	0	5	4	0	0	0	3	–	–	–	–	–	–	–	–	–	–	–
2020	Atlas	5	0	0	0	0	0	0	0	0	0	7	–	–	–	–	–	–	–	–	–	–	–
		9	0	0	0	0	5	4	0	0	0	10	0	0	0	0	0	0	0	0	0	0	0
Career total:		9	0	0	0	0	5	4	0	0	0	10											

GP–Games played; G–Goals; 2PG–2-point goals; A–Assists; Pts–Points; Sh–Shots; GB–Ground balls; Pen–Penalties; PIM–Penalty minutes; FOW–Faceoffs won; FOA–Faceoffs attempted

=== NLL ===
Jeremy Thompson		Regular season									Playoffs								
Season	Team	GP	G	A	Pts	LB	PIM	Pts/GP	LB/GP	PIM/GP	GP	G	A	Pts	LB	PIM	Pts/GP	LB/GP	PIM/GP
2012	Buffalo Bandits	14	3	6	9	72	25	0.64	5.14	1.79	0	0	0	0	0	0	0.00	0.00	0.00
2013	Edmonton Rush	16	7	5	12	131	32	0.75	8.19	2.00	1	0	2	2	6	0	2.00	6.00	0.00
2014	Edmonton Rush	18	9	8	17	165	23	0.94	9.17	1.28	3	0	0	0	25	0	0.00	8.33	0.00
2015	Edmonton Rush	18	8	7	15	181	41	0.83	10.06	2.28	5	3	1	4	34	0	0.80	6.80	0.00
2016	Saskatchewan Rush	18	7	13	20	174	6	1.11	9.67	0.33	4	1	1	2	37	0	0.50	9.25	0.00
2017	Saskatchewan Rush	18	5	12	17	179	18	0.94	9.94	1.00	4	4	1	5	44	0	1.25	11.00	0.00
2018	Saskatchewan Rush	18	6	9	15	164	26	0.83	9.11	1.44	3	1	2	3	17	0	1.00	5.67	0.00
2019	Saskatchewan Rush	18	3	7	10	208	28	0.56	11.56	1.56	1	0	0	0	8	0	0.00	8.00	0.00
2020	Saskatchewan Rush	10	4	9	13	81	20	1.30	8.10	2.00	–	–	–	–	–	–	–	–	–
2022	Panther City Lacrosse Club	17	4	13	17	143	13	1.00	8.41	0.76	–	–	–	–	–	–	–	–	–
2023	Georgia Swarm	18	4	5	9	168	27	0.50	9.33	1.50	–	–	–	–	–	–	–	–	–
		183	60	94	154	1,666	259	0.84	9.10	1.42	21	9	7	16	171	0	0.76	8.14	0.00
Career Total:		204	69	101	170	1,837	259	0.83	9.00	1.27									

GP–Games played; G–Goals; A–Assists; Pts–Points; LB–Loose balls; PIM–Penalty minutes; Pts/GP–Points per games played; LB/GP–Loose balls per games played; PIM/GP–Penalty minutes per games played.
