= 2027 Vancouver Warriors season =

Canadian lacrosse team season

2027 Vancouver Warriors
- League: NLL
- 2027 record: 0–0
- Home record: 0–0
- Road record: 0–0
- Goals for: 0
- Goals against: 0
- General Manager: Curt Malawsky
- Coach: Curt Malawsky
- Captain: Brett Mydske
- Alternate captains: Keegan Bal (home); Matt Beers (home); Reid Bowering (away); Ryan Dilks (away)
- Arena: Rogers Arena
- Average attendance: TBD

Team leaders
- Goals: TBD
- Assists: TBD
- Points: TBD
- Penalties in minutes: TBD
- Loose Balls: TBD
- Wins: TBD
- Goals against average: TBD

The Vancouver Warriors are a professional lacrosse team based in Vancouver, British Columbia. The team plays in the National Lacrosse League (NLL). The 2027 season was the 27th in franchise history and the 13th season in Vancouver. The franchise previously played in Everett, Washington, San Jose, and Albany, New York.

== Regular season ==
=== Current standings ===
P	Team	GP	W	L	PCT	GB	Home	Road	GF	GA	Diff	GF/GP	GA/GP
1	Oshawa FireWolves	0	0	0	.000	0.0	0–0	0–0	0	0	−-0	0.00	0.00
2	Buffalo Bandits	0	0	0	.000	0.0	0–0	0–0	0	0	−-0	0.00	0.00
3	Calgary Roughnecks	0	0	0	.000	0.0	0–0	0–0	0	0	−-0	0.00	0.00
4	Colorado Mammoth	0	0	0	.000	0.0	0–0	0–0	0	0	−-0	0.00	0.00
5	Georgia Swarm	0	0	0	.000	0.0	0–0	0–0	0	0	−-0	0.00	0.00
6	Halifax Thunderbirds	0	0	0	.000	0.0	0–0	0–0	0	0	−-0	0.00	0.00
7	Las Vegas Desert Dogs	0	0	0	.000	0.0	0–0	0–0	0	0	−-0	0.00	0.00
8	Rochester Knighthawks	0	0	0	.000	0.0	0–0	0–0	0	0	−-0	0.00	0.00
9	San Diego Seals	0	0	0	.000	0.0	0–0	0–0	0	0	−-0	0.00	0.00
10	Saskatchewan Rush	0	0	0	.000	0.0	0–0	0–0	0	0	−-0	0.00	0.00
11	Toronto Rock	0	0	0	.000	0.0	0–0	0–0	0	0	−-0	0.00	0.00
12	Vancouver Warriors	0	0	0	.000	0.0	0–0	0–0	0	0	−-0	0.00	0.00

=== Regular season ===
Game	Date	Opponent	Location	Score	OT	Attendance	Record
1	December 5, 2026	@ Saskatchewan Rush	SaskTel Centre				
2	December 18, 2026	Georgia Swarm	Rogers Arena				
3	January 2, 2027	@ Buffalo Bandits	KeyBank Center				
4	January 3, 2027	@ Rochester Knighthawks	Blue Cross Arena				
5	January 8, 2027	Calgary Roughnecks	Rogers Arena				
6	January 15, 2027	Toronto Rock	Rogers Arena				
7	January 22, 2027	@ Halifax Thunderbirds	Scotiabank Centre				
8	February 6, 2027	San Diego Seals	Rogers Arena				
9	February 12, 2027	Oshawa FireWolves	Rogers Arena				
10	February 20, 2027	@ Las Vegas Desert Dogs	Lee's Family Forum				
11	March 5, 2027	Las Vegas Desert Dogs	Rogers Arena				
12	March 19, 2027	Buffalo Bandits	Rogers Arena				
13	March 26, 2027	@ Colorado Mammoth	Ball Arena				
14	April 2, 2027	Saskatchewan Rush	Rogers Arena				
15	April 3, 2027	@ Calgary Roughnecks	Scotiabank Saddledome				
16	April 9, 2027	@ Toronto Rock	TD Coliseum				
17	April 17, 2027	Colorado Mammoth	Rogers Arena				
18	April 25, 2027	@ San Diego Seals	Frontwave Arena				

== Roster ==
Vancouver Warriors roster
Active (21-man) roster		Inactive roster	Coaches
Goaltenders: 35 (Canada) Christian Del Bianco; 39 (Canada) Connor O'Toole; Defencemen: 2 (Canada) Matt Beers (A); 28 (Canada) Reid Bowering (A); 11 (Canada) Reece Callies; 13 (Canada) Jeff Cornwall; 24 (Canada) Ryan Dilks (A); 15 (Canada) Tyler Garrison; 20 (Canada) Nathan Miller; 12 (Canada) Brett Mydske (C); 88 (Canada) Remo Schenato; 37 (Canada) Jackson Suboch	Forwards: 45 (Canada) Keegan Bal (A); 8 (Canada) Adam Charalambides; 17 (Canada) Curtis Dickson; 19 (Canada) Jesse King; –– (Canada) Marshal King; 14 (Canada) Marcus Klarich; 96 (Canada) Ryan Martel; 91 (Canada) Ryan Sheridan; Transition: 16 (Canada) Owen Grant; 73 (United States) Alec Stathakis; 74 (Canada) Ethan Ticehurst		Head coach: Curt Malawsky; Assistant coaches: Bob McMahon (offence); Rob Williams (defence); Tyler Richards (player development); Grant Coghill (video); Legend: * Suspended list; (C) Captain; (A) Alternate captain; Roster updated NLL Transactions

=== Entry Draft ===
The 2026 NLL Entry Draft took place on September 24, 2026.

The Vancouver Warriors selected:

Round	Overall	Player	Position	Year of Birth	College/Club
1	3	Matt Collison	midfield	2003	Johns Hopkins University
1	16	Marcus Khan	goaltender	2008	Coquitlam Adanacs Jr. A (BCJALL)
2	27	Jeremy Wudrick	forward	2004	Lander University
2	28	Blake Young	defence	2006	Port Coquitlam Saints Jr. A (BCJALL)
3	32	Joel Mullen	defence	2004	University of Utah
5	61	Henry Dodge	faceoff	2004	University of Maryland
6	66	Joel McCormick	forward	2003	Robert Morris University
