= 2027 NLL season =

- League: National Lacrosse League
- Sport: Indoor lacrosse (box lacrosse)
- Duration: November 27, 2026 - April 25, 2027
- Games: 18
- Teams: 12
- TV partner: FloSports

Draft
- Top draft pick: Finn Thomson
- Picked by: Rochester Knighthawks

NLL seasons
- ← 2026 season 2028 season →

The 2027 NLL season is the 40th season of play of the National Lacrosse League (NLL). The season begins in November 2026, and ends in spring of 2027.

== League business ==
On August 21, 2026, the San Diego Seals announced that they were relocating to Frontwave Arena

On September 10, the league announced that the Philadelphia Wings and the Ottawa Black Bears would cease operations. The league held a dispersal draft on September 15.

== Teams ==
2026 National Lacrosse League
Team	City	Arena	Capacity
Buffalo Bandits	Buffalo, New York	KeyBank Center	19,070
Calgary Roughnecks	Calgary, Alberta	Scotiabank Saddledome	19,289
Colorado Mammoth	Denver, Colorado	Ball Arena	18,000
Georgia Swarm	Duluth, Georgia	Gas South Arena	10,500
Halifax Thunderbirds	Halifax, Nova Scotia	Scotiabank Centre	10,595
Las Vegas Desert Dogs	Henderson, Nevada	Lee's Family Forum	5,567
Oshawa FireWolves	Oshawa, Ontario	Tribute Communities Centre	5,180
Rochester Knighthawks	Rochester, New York	Blue Cross Arena	10,662
San Diego Seals	Oceanside, California	Frontwave Arena	5,500
Saskatchewan Rush	Saskatoon, Saskatchewan	SaskTel Centre	15,195
Toronto Rock	Hamilton, Ontario	TD Coliseum	18,000
Vancouver Warriors	Vancouver, British Columbia	Rogers Arena	18,910

== Map of teams ==
NLL Teams

== Regular season ==
P	Team	GP	W	L	PCT	GB	Home	Road	GF	GA	Diff	GF/GP	GA/GP
1	Oshawa FireWolves	0	0	0	.000	0.0	0–0	0–0	0	0	−-0	0.00	0.00
2	Buffalo Bandits	0	0	0	.000	0.0	0–0	0–0	0	0	−-0	0.00	0.00
3	Calgary Roughnecks	0	0	0	.000	0.0	0–0	0–0	0	0	−-0	0.00	0.00
4	Colorado Mammoth	0	0	0	.000	0.0	0–0	0–0	0	0	−-0	0.00	0.00
5	Georgia Swarm	0	0	0	.000	0.0	0–0	0–0	0	0	−-0	0.00	0.00
6	Halifax Thunderbirds	0	0	0	.000	0.0	0–0	0–0	0	0	−-0	0.00	0.00
7	Las Vegas Desert Dogs	0	0	0	.000	0.0	0–0	0–0	0	0	−-0	0.00	0.00
8	Rochester Knighthawks	0	0	0	.000	0.0	0–0	0–0	0	0	−-0	0.00	0.00
9	San Diego Seals	0	0	0	.000	0.0	0–0	0–0	0	0	−-0	0.00	0.00
10	Saskatchewan Rush	0	0	0	.000	0.0	0–0	0–0	0	0	−-0	0.00	0.00
11	Toronto Rock	0	0	0	.000	0.0	0–0	0–0	0	0	−-0	0.00	0.00
12	Vancouver Warriors	0	0	0	.000	0.0	0–0	0–0	0	0	−-0	0.00	0.00

x = clinched playoff berth | z = clinched top overall record

== Awards ==
=== Annual awards ===
Award	Winner	Other Finalists
Most Valuable Player		
Goaltender of the Year		
Defensive Player of the Year		
Transition Player of the Year		
Offensive Player of the Year		
Rookie of the Year		
Sportsmanship Award		
GM of the Year		
Les Bartley Award		
Executive of the Year Award		
Teammate of the Year Award		
Tom Borrelli Award		

== Stadiums and locations ==
Georgia Swarm	Oshawa FireWolves	Vancouver Warriors	Las Vegas Desert Dogs
Gas South Arena	Tribute Communities Centre	Rogers Arena	Lee's Family Forum
Capacity: 11,355	Capacity: 5,180	Capacity: 18,910	Capacity: 5,567

Buffalo Bandits	Halifax Thunderbirds	Rochester Knighthawks	Toronto Rock
KeyBank Center	Scotiabank Centre	Blue Cross Arena	TD Coliseum
Capacity: 19,070	Capacity: 10,595	Capacity: 11,200	Capacity: 17,383

Calgary Roughnecks	Colorado Mammoth	San Diego Seals	Saskatchewan Rush
WestJet Field at Scotiabank Saddledome	Ball Arena	Frontwave Arena	Co-op Field at SaskTel Centre
Capacity: 19,289	Capacity: 18,007	Capacity: 5,500	Capacity: 15,190

=== Regular season ===
Home Team	Home Games	Average Attendance	Total Attendance
Buffalo Bandits			
Calgary Roughnecks			
Colorado Mammoth			
Halifax Thunderbirds			
Vancouver Warriors			
Toronto Rock			
Saskatchewan Rush			
Las Vegas Desert Dogs			
Georgia Swarm			
Rochester Knighthawks			
San Diego Seals			
Oshawa FireWolves			
League	0	0	0

== See also ==
- 2027 in sports
