= Lyle Thompson =

Haudenosaunee lacrosse player (born 1992)

Lyle Thompson Deyhahsanoondey
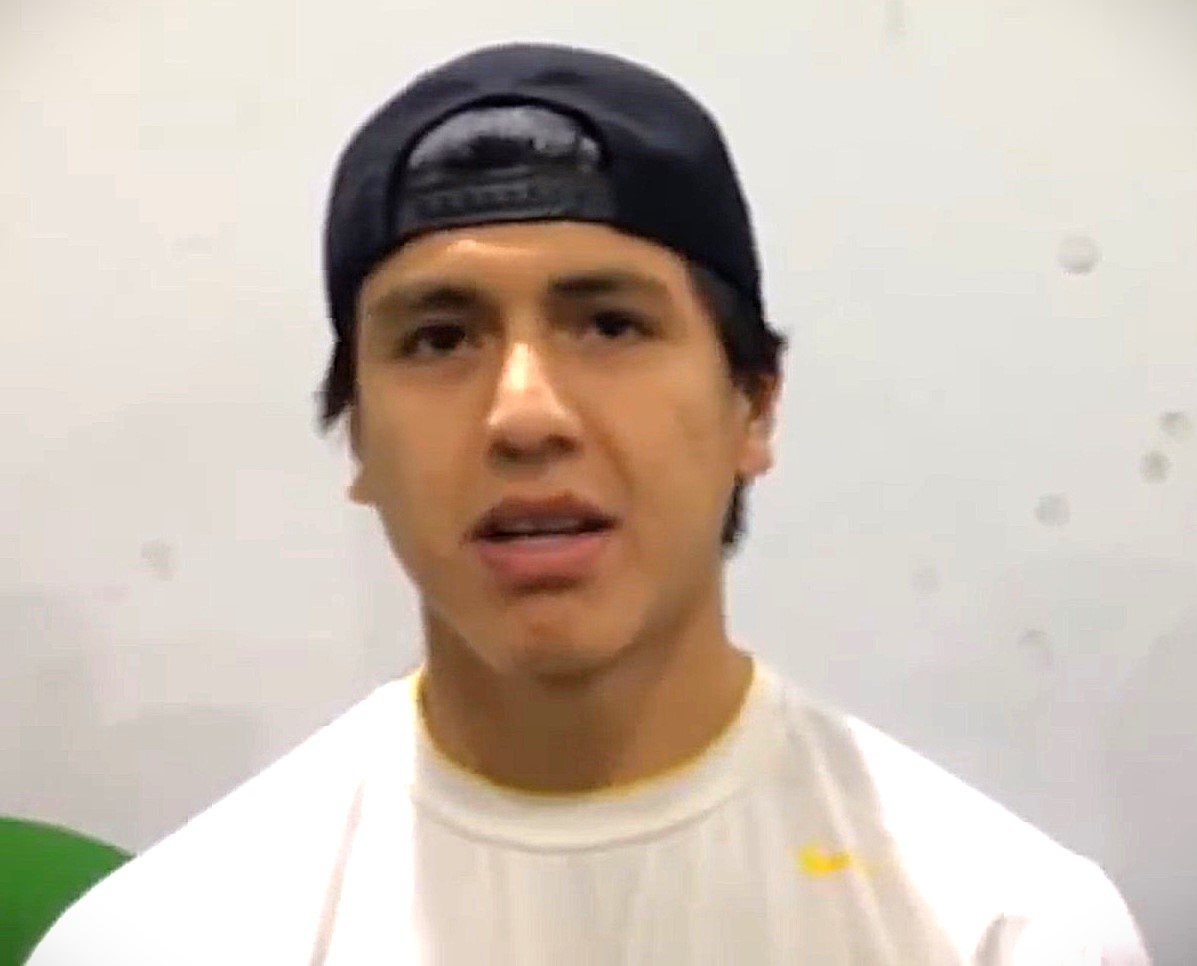
- Thompson in 2015

Personal information
- Nationality: Haudenosaunee
- Born: September 9, 1992 (age 34) Nedrow, New York, U.S.
- Height: 6 ft 1 in (185 cm)
- Weight: 180 lb (82 kg; 12 st 12 lb)

Sport
- Position: Attack / Forward
- Shoots: Right
- NCAA team: Albany (2015)
- NLL draft: 1st overall, 2015; Georgia Swarm
- NLL team: Georgia Swarm
- MLL draft: 1st overall, 2015; Florida Launch
- MLL teams: Florida Launch; Chesapeake Bayhawks
- PLL team: Boston Cannons
- NCAA team: Albany
- Pro career: 2015–present

Career highlights
- PLL: Eamon McEneaney Attackman of the Year (2022); 2x 1st Team All-Pro (2021, 2022); Welles Crowther Humanitarian Award (2021, 2022); PLL Top Scorer (2022); NLL: 2017 NLL Championship; 2017 NLL Championship MVP; NLL MVP (2017); NLL Top Scorer (2017); 6× Sportsmanship Award (2018, 2019, 2020, 2022, 2023, 2024); First Team All-Pro (2019); Second Team All-Pro (2018); All-Rookie Team (2016); International Box: 2× Silver Medal (2015, 2019); 1st Team All-World (2015); International Field: 3× Bronze Medal (2014, 2018, 2023); 1st Team All-World (2014); MLL: 2019 MLL Championship; MLL MVP (2019); MLL Top Scorer (2019); MLL Offensive Player of the Year (2019); NCAA: 2× Tewaaraton Trophy (2014, 2015); 2× Lt. Raymond Enners Award (2014, 2015); 2× Jack Turnbull Award (2014, 2015); 3× USILA All-American (2013, 2014, 2015)
Medal record
Representing Haudenosaunee
Men's lacrosse
World Lacrosse Championship
Third place	2014 Denver
Third place	2018 Netanya
Third place	2023 San Diego
World Indoor Lacrosse Championship
Runner-up	2015 Onondaga
Runner-up	2019 Langley

Lyle Thompson (born September 9, 1992) is a Haudenosaunee professional lacrosse player from the Hawk Clan of the Onondaga Nation. His native name is Deyhahsanoondey ('He is Flying Over Us'). He plays both indoor and outdoor professional lacrosse. In professional outdoor lacrosse, he plays at the attack position for the Cannons Lacrosse Club of the Premier Lacrosse League. In professional indoor lacrosse, he plays at the forward position for the Georgia Swarm of the National Lacrosse League. He also competes internationally in both indoor lacrosse for Haudenosaunee men's national indoor lacrosse team, and outdoor lacrosse for the Haudenosaunee men's national outdoor lacrosse team.

He played lacrosse in college at the University at Albany. In his junior year he shared the 2014 men's Tewaaraton Award with his older brother Miles. In the same year, that attack line consisting of those two and their cousin, Ty Thompson, dubbed the Thompson Trio, shattered multiple NCAA Division 1 records, and is widely considered one of the greatest attack lines in college lacrosse history. In his senior year, he won the award again alone. As a professional indoor lacrosse player, Lyle has won the 2017 NLL MVP award, championship and championship MVP. He was first-team all-pro in 2019. As a professional outdoor lacrosse player, he was named the 2022 PLL Attackman of the Year. As an international player, he won the 2015 and 2019 world box lacrosse medals being named first-team all-world honors in 2015, and won the 2014, 2018 and 2023 bronze world field lacrosse medals, being named first-team all-world honors in 2014.

Lyle Thompson is widely regarded as one of the greatest lacrosse players of all time, and the greatest lacrosse player of his generation. (Note: Attributed to multiple sources:) He is renowned for his creativity, (Note: Attributed to multiple sources:) extraordinary stick skills, vision and keen playmaking ability. The USA men's outdoor lacrosse team head coach, John Danowski, stated of Lyle Thompson that "he transcends the sport."

Lyle pioneered backhand play, especially in shooting, also known as the shovel shot, which is the salient component of his signature move, the Deyhaus Dunk. Together, the Thompson collective has popularized the traditional Indigenous American style of playing lacrosse, involving a more inspired, freestyle, versatile approach that incorporates a wider variety of stick handling, passing and shooting techniques, previously considered more unorthodox in mainstream codified lacrosse. They have been an inspiration and served as role models to the next generation of lacrosse players, especially within the Indigenous American community.

He cofounded the lacrosse company Thompson Brothers Lacrosse, which engages in event speaking, lacrosse development projects, and community building initiatives, while emphasizing the indigenous roots of the sport.

Lyle Thompson is also an active humanitarian, using his platform for positive change, and has won humanitarian awards multiple times for these ventures. Among these pursuits are his participation in the #everychildmatters movement and spreading awareness about the atrocities of the residential schools that were designed to indoctrinate Indigenous children into Christian Canadian culture.

== Early life ==
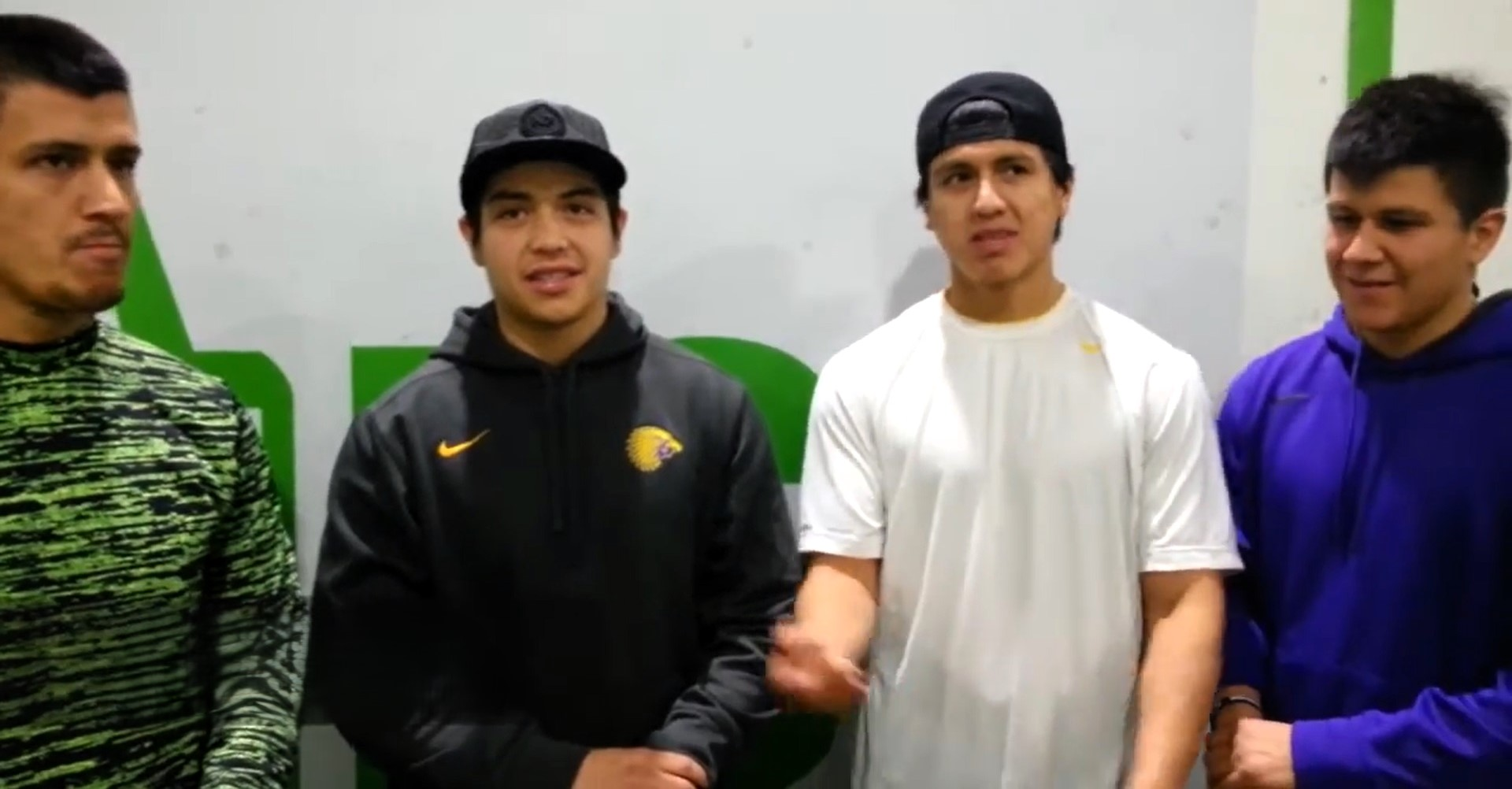
Left to right: Jeremy, Miles, Lyle, and Jerome "Hiana" Thompson in 2015

Lyle grew up on the Native American reservation, Onondaga Nation, NY. He is the second youngest of the five children of Jerome "Ji" Thompson Sr., a Mohawk father from Akwesasne and third generation ironworker with 'Ironworkers Local 60', and his wife, Doloris Thompson, an Onondaga mother. His three older brothers Jeremy Thompson, Jerome (“Hiana”) Thompson and Miles Thompson are also professional lacrosse players, along with his cousin Ty Thompson, who is from the Mohawk Nation. In accordance with Haudenosaunee tradition, he and his brothers were each given a wooden stick as a newborn. He began playing lacrosse from a very early age as lacrosse carries spiritual and cultural significance with the Onondaga nation. Growing up, he and his brothers would spend much of their time playing lacrosse in the backyard, often with their father coaching them for hours.

In 1999, the Thompsons moved from St. Regis Mohawk Reservation south to the Onondaga Reservation. The Onondaga house that they grew up in was built by Ji himself, and had no electricity or running water until about 2003. This was a factor in the amount of time they spent playing backyard lacrosse, as they did not have things like television or video games. Lyle had not grown up doing strength training, and developed those attributes later in his career.

Growing up, Lyle admired his eldest brother, Jeremy, as he served as a role model for Lyle. Also, the Thompson brothers have an extensive lacrosse heritage, as their father played lacrosse and their grandfather played lacrosse. Their father, Jerome Thompson Sr. played men's Senior B lacrosse until he was 37, playing on the Akwesasne Thunder Sr. B squad, winning the 1995 and 1997 President's Cups, Canada's national second-division box lacrosse championships. He also played with the 1990 Iroquois Nationals international lacrosse team.

Early in grade school, Lyle would often get into physical altercations with anti-Indigenous students, who were ignorant of Indigenous people and culture, especially his traditional hair braid.

== High School: 2007–2011 ==
Lyle Thompson's high school lacrosse career spanned two different teams, Salmon River High School lacrosse team and LaFayette High School lacrosse team. He played a total of five years of high lacrosse, as he was on Salmon River's high school varsity team as an eighth grader. Paul Rabil stated that Lyle was "the #1 High School recruit in the country...as a sophomore".

=== Salmon River High School: 2007-2008 ===
Lyle Thompson played for Salmon River High School during his eighth grade year. He scored 50 points that season before he injured his collarbone, shortening his season. After the injury, one arm was in a sling, but Lyle would still attend lacrosse practice wielding his lacrosse with the one arm that was healthy. During this time, he developed an advanced skill set of one-handed lacrosse play, particularly bottom-hand one-handed play. This technique was integrated into his style of play, Lyle becoming noted for his "uncanny ability to wield the stick with one hand under immense pressure". It was later popularized in the sport overall, despite being previously viewed as unorthodox, and generally discouraged by lacrosse coaches, including his father.

In his freshman year of high school, he scored 114 points. He received first-team Times All-North honors and was named the section’s most valuable player as a freshman.

=== LaFayette High School: 2009-2010 ===
Lyle Thompson played for LaFayette High School for his sophomore and junior years. In his sophomore year, he scored 59 goals 52 assists leading his team to the Class C State Final against Manhasset. He had a breakout performance in the state title game that year, scoring five goals.

In his junior year, he totaled 111 points. This was second-most in Section 3. He was awarded first-team All-CNY honors for the second time.

=== Salmon River High School: 2011 ===
For his senior year of high school, Lyle re-transferred back to Salmon River High School. There, he scored 66 goals and 54 assists and received All-American honors.

== College: 2011–2015 ==
Lyle Thompson attended college at the University at Albany, majoring in sociology, although he initially pursued an art major as he has a passion for drawing. Inside Lacrosse ranked him as the #1 recruit for the 2011-12 high school graduating class. Lyle committed to play for the Albany Great Danes men's lacrosse team under head coach, Scott Marr. Typically, Indigenous American lacrosse recruits would play for Syracuse University. The Thompsons choosing UAlbany over Syracuse University was a landmark decision, stating that they wanted to make their impact on their own.

Lyle Thompson is widely considered the greatest lacrosse player in University at Albany history and one of the greatest college lacrosse players of all time. He has also been referred to as one of the greatest college athletes of his generation. ESPN lacrosse analyst, Paul Carcaterra, has referred to Lyle as the most prolific passer in NCAA lacrosse history. Another ESPN lacrosse analyst, Anish Shroff said about Lyle in a 2015 Sportscenter episode:

"He's been more than just the best player in college lacrosse. He's been more than just a generational player. Lyle Thompson has been transformative and transcendent."

In a decade-retrospective piece for 2010s college lacrosse, Inside Lacrosse referred to Lyle Thompson as "the biggest “hit” of a No. 1 recruit this decade".

Lyle won the University of Albany 2024 Stoneman Distinguished Alumni Award.

=== Freshman season: 2012 ===
Initially, he started at midfield in his freshman season in 2012, scoring 22 goals and 16 assists along with 32 face-off draws. That was his last collegiate season scoring less than 100 points.

=== Sophomore season: 2013 ===
Moving to attack in his sophomore year, Thompson had 113 points. In this season, Albany defeated Syracuse for the first time. Miles Thompson scored the winning goal in double overtime.

=== Junior season: 2014 ===
In 2014, Lyle, along with his brother Miles were the first Native American players to win the Tewaaraton Trophy; tewaaraton being the Mohawk term for the precursor of modern lacrosse. In the same year, Lyle was nominated for the 2014 Best Male College Athlete ESPY Award. He was also named the Lacrosse Magazine 2014 'Person of the Year', and is the only person to do so as a college player.

=== Senior season: 2015 ===
In his last season of college lacrosse, Lyle won the Tewaaraton Award a second consecutive time. He is the only college men's lacrosse player to win the award twice consecutively, and one of only two to win the award twice, the other being Mikey Powell.

Lyle also set a new career points record of 400 points, which was later broken by Chris Gray, who scored 401 points (which was across an extra year of eligibility due to the COVID pandemic).

== Professional career: 2015–present ==
Lyle Thompson plays both indoor and outdoor professional lacrosse. He is widely regarded as one of the greatest lacrosse players of all time. ESPN lacrosse analyst, Paul Carcaterra, has described Lyle as being on his 'Mount Rushmore' of greatest lacrosse players, alongside attackman Mikey Powell, midfielder Gary Gait and defenseman David Pietramala. In 2017, Paul Rabil stated that Lyle's "legacy of success on the field will live on for generations to come."

=== Outdoor Lacrosse ===
==== Major League Lacrosse: 2015–2020 ====
Lyle Thompson was drafted as the top overall pick in the 2015 Collegiate Draft by the Florida Launch; his brother Miles was drafted by the Launch the previous year. Lyle's first game was played against the Ohio Machine, and he played a total of eight games for the Launch during the 2015 season. He had 22 goals and 16 assists in his first season in Major League Lacrosse. On March 3, 2017, Lyle Thompson and his brother Jeremy Thompson were traded from the Florida Launch to the Chesapeake Bayhawks. In 2018 Lyle appeared in 6 games for the Bayhawks netting 20 goals, 1-2pt goal, 8 assists, and 17 ground balls.

==== Premier Lacrosse League: 2021–present ====
Lyle Thompson is an attackman for Cannons Lacrosse Club of the Premier Lacrosse League (PLL). He was not initially signed to PLL when it started in 2019 because he had signed a long-term contract with the MLL in 2017. Lyle joined the PLL when the two leagues merged in 2020. The PLL president, Paul Rabil, stated "For me, the MLL merger was about getting Lyle Thompson - that was it."

In the 2022 season, he set a new league record for most points (44 points) in a season across 9 games, while missing a game due to injury. He also led the league in one-point goals (26 goals). The record was broken two seasons later by Jeff Teat.

Thompson opted to take a sabbatical from the PLL for the 2023 and 2024 season. He stated that he wants to focus on himself, his family and his community.

The PLL website describes Lyle Thompson as "one of the greatest players of all-time" in the bio of his player page.

=== Indoor Lacrosse ===
==== National Lacrosse League: 2015–present ====
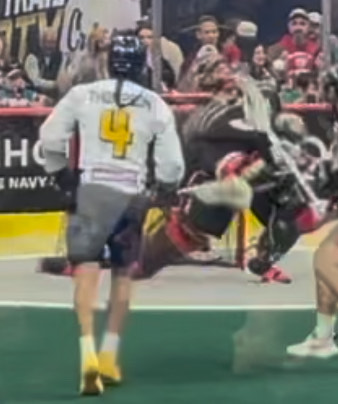
Lyle Thompson during NLL game

On September 28, 2015, Lyle was drafted first overall in the 2015 NLL draft by the Georgia Swarm. Lyle played alongside his brother Miles on the Swarm. In 2017, Thompson was named both league MVP and Championship MVP as the Swarm won their first NLL title. Winning the MVP award in only his third year in the NLL is the fastest any player has ever won the MVP award.

On January 7, 2017, the Thompson brothers, Lyle, Miles, Jeremy and Jerome set the Guinness World Record for “Most siblings to compete in same professional lacrosse game”.

Heading into the 2023 NLL season, Inside Lacrosse ranked Thompson the #4 best forward in the NLL.

Lyle Thompson has won the NLL Sportsmanship award multiple times.

===== 2019 discrimination incident =====
On Saturday January 12, 2019, the Georgia Swarm played at the Wells Fargo Center against the Philadelphia Wings. The game concluded with a Swarm victory 13-11, with Lyle scoring 3 goals and 3 assists. The game received widespread media coverage because of derogatory and discriminatory statements made during the game. Specifically, Philadelphia Wings public address announcer, Shawny Hill stated "let's snip the ponytail right here" about Lyle Thompson's traditional Indigenous American hair braid. Lyle also reported that two fans seated behind the Georgia Swarm bench stated they were going to scalp him.

Historically, it was routine for administrators at residential schools in Canada and the United States to remove the original hairstyle of Indigenous children in part of a deculturalization process designed to sever the children's connection to their heritage, families and communities. Reminiscent of this history, Swarm teammate Brendan Bomberry tweeted that Hill's statement "was disgusting and a reality for my ancestors when they were forced into Christian residential schools". Lyle Thompson tweeted that he had not heard discriminatory hostility like that since he was in high school.

The announcer was promptly fired from his position. The Philadelphia Wings issued the following statement:

"Shawny Hill has been permanently removed from his role with the Philadelphia Wings and has been suspended from all in-arena announcing assignments at the Wells Fargo Center. In addition, the Wings are working closely with the National Lacrosse League to implement ongoing diversity training for all employees which will include a focus on the Native North American roots and traditions of the sport. The Wings remain deeply apologetic for the offensive comments that overshadowed Saturday night’s game and are fully committed to furthering a culture of respect."

Announcer Shawny Hill apologized on Twitter stating

"I am deeply sorry for my insensitive statements during last night's game. My words were poorly chosen and were not intended as racially motivated. I understand the profound hurt my words have caused. I offer my sincere apology. My words do not reflect my personal beliefs, but represent a lack of knowledge on heritage and history."

In accordance with the league administrative decision, Hill has since not returned to announcing.

==== Major Series Lacrosse: 2023 - Present ====
Thompson played for the Six Nations Chiefs of the Major Series Lacrosse League in the 2023 season, winning that season's MVP award and the championship. The Chiefs won the championship again in the 2024 season, with Lyle winning the finals MVP award. In 2025, the Chiefs won the championship again.

== International competition: 2014–present ==
=== International Box Lacrosse: 2015-present ===
==== 2015 World Lacrosse Box Championship ====
Lyle Thompson played at the forward position for the Haudenosaunee men's national lacrosse team (then under the name Iroquois) at the 2015 World Indoor Lacrosse Championship. The team won the silver medal, falling to Canada (12-8) in the championship finals game. Lyle was award first-team all world honors.

==== 2019 World Lacrosse Box Championship ====
Lyle Thompson played at the forward position for the Haudenosaunee men's national lacrosse team (then under the name Iroquois) at the 2019 World Indoor Lacrosse Championship. The team won the silver medal, falling to Canada (19-12) in the championship finals game.

=== International Field Lacrosse: 2014-present ===
==== 2014 World Lacrosse Championship ====
Lyle Thompson played at the attack position for the Haudenosaunee men's national lacrosse team (then under the name Iroquois) in the 2014 World Lacrosse Championship. The team placed third, a new high placement record for the team. Lyle won first-team all-world honors.

==== 2018 World Lacrosse Championship ====
Lyle played at the attack position for the Haudenosaunee men's national lacrosse team (then under the name Iroquois) in the 2018 World Lacrosse Championship in Israel. The team placed third.

==== 2023 World Lacrosse Championship ====
Lyle played at the attack position for the Haudenosaunee men's national lacrosse team in the 2023 World Lacrosse Championship in San Diego, California. The team placed third.

== Statistics ==
=== College statistics ===
Season	GP	G	A	Pts	PPG
2015	19	52	69	121	6.37
2014	18	51	77	128 ^{(a)}	7.11
2013	17	50	63	113	6.65
2012	16	22	16	38	2.38
Totals	70	175	225 ^{(b)}	400 ^{(c)}	5.71

^{(a)} 2nd in Division I career points
^{(b)} 2nd in Division I career assists
^{(c)} 1st in Division I single season points

=== NLL career statistics ===
Lyle Thompson		Regular season									Playoffs								
Season	Team	GP	G	A	Pts	LB	PIM	Pts/GP	LB/GP	PIM/GP	GP	G	A	Pts	LB	PIM	Pts/GP	LB/GP	PIM/GP
2016	Georgia Swarm	18	27	33	60	81	14	3.33	4.50	0.78	1	4	2	6	8	0	6.00	8.00	0.00
2017	Georgia Swarm	18	45	71	116	126	8	6.44	7.00	0.44	4	6	15	21	20	0	5.25	5.00	0.00
2018	Georgia Swarm	18	46	40	86	123	6	4.78	6.83	0.33	1	1	2	3	10	0	3.00	10.00	0.00
2019	Georgia Swarm	18	43	62	105	94	6	5.83	5.22	0.33	1	3	4	7	7	0	7.00	7.00	0.00
2020	Georgia Swarm	12	27	33	60	87	4	5.00	7.25	0.33	–	–	–	–	–	–	–	–	–
2022	Georgia Swarm	17	47	55	102	107	8	6.00	6.29	0.47	–	–	–	–	–	–	–	–	–
2023	Georgia Swarm	18	46	60	106	113	2	5.89	6.28	0.11	–	–	–	–	–	–	–	–	–
2024	Georgia Swarm	18	42	45	87	115	8	4.83	6.39	0.44	1	2	3	5	10	2	5.00	10.00	2.00
2025	Georgia Swarm	18	42	52	94	111	2	5.22	6.17	0.11	1	1	3	4	5	0	4.00	5.00	0.00
2026	Georgia Swarm	18	29	48	77	89	6	4.28	4.94	0.33	4	9	17	26	6	0	6.50	1.50	0.00
		173	394	499	893	1,046	64	5.16	6.05	0.37	13	26	46	72	66	2	5.54	5.08	0.15
Career Total:		186	420	545	965	1,112	66	5.19	5.98	0.35									

GP–Games played; G–Goals; A–Assists; Pts–Points; LB–Loose balls; PIM–Penalty minutes; Pts/GP–Points per games played; LB/GP–Loose balls per games played; PIM/GP–Penalty minutes per games played.

=== MLL career statistics ===
Season	Team	Regular season											Playoffs										
Season	Team	GP	G	2PG	A	Pts	Sh	GB	Pen	PIM	FOW	FOA	GP	G	2PG	A	Pts	Sh	GB	Pen	PIM	FOW	FOA
2015	Florida Launch	8	22	0	16	38	53	17	0	0	0	0	–	–	–	–	–	–	–	–	–	–	–
2016	Florida Launch	9	14	0	18	32	50	18	0	0	0	0	–	–	–	–	–	–	–	–	–	–	–
2017	Chesapeake Bayhawks	6	19	1	8	28	54	17	0	1	0	0	–	–	–	–	–	–	–	–	–	–	–
2018	Chesapeake Bayhawks	3	7	0	3	10	23	5	0	1	0	0	1	4	0	1	5	7	3	0	0	0	0
2019	Chesapeake Bayhawks	15	46	0	27	73	137	35	1	1	0	0	2	5	0	3	8	14	5	0	0	0	0
2020	Chesapeake Bayhawks	5	14	0	5	19	37	12	0	0	0	0	–	–	–	–	–	–	–	–	–	–	–
		46	122	1	77	200	354	104	1	3	0	0	3	9	0	4	13	21	8	0	0	0	0
Career total:		49	131	1	81	213	375	112	1	3	0	0											

GP–Games played; G–Goals; 2PG–2-point goals; A–Assists; Pts–Points; Sh–Shots; GB–Ground balls; Pen–Penalties; PIM–Penalty minutes; FOW–Faceoffs won; FOA–Faceoffs attempted

=== PLL statistics ===
Season	Team	Regular season											Playoffs										
Season	Team	GP	G	2PG	A	Pts	Sh	GB	Pen	PIM	FOW	FOA	GP	G	2PG	A	Pts	Sh	GB	Pen	PIM	FOW	FOA
2021	Cannons	9	22	0	10	32	67	21	2	1	0	0	1	1	0	2	3	6	4	0	0	0	0
2022	Cannons	9	26	0	18	44	66	22	1	0.5	0	0	–	–	–	–	–	–	–	–	–	–	–
		18	48	0	28	76	133	43	3	1.5	0	0	1	1	0	2	3	6	4	0	0	0	0
Career total:		19	49	0	30	79	139	47	3	1.5	0	0											

GP–Games played; G–Goals; 2PG–2-point goals; A–Assists; Pts–Points; Sh–Shots; GB–Ground balls; Pen–Penalties; PIM–Penalty minutes; FOW–Faceoffs won; FOA–Faceoffs attempted

== Humanitarianism ==
The Thompson brothers founded the non-profit philanthropic organization, the 4 The Future Foundation, which aims to help Indigenous and underserved kids grow and thrive.

In the early 2020s, when hundreds of Canadian Indigenous residential school gravesites were found, Lyle Thompson took the initiative to raise awareness about the issue using various methods, such as popularizing the #everychildmatters movement, wearing its specialized orange helmet chinstraps and wearing an orange ribbon in his braid during games. He was on the Sports Illustrated cover to raise awareness for the movement.

Lyle Thompson was also present at Dakota Access Pipeline protests in support of the Standing Rock Reservation. His college lacrosse coach Scott Marr, was also actively advocating for the Standing Rock Reservation.

== Personal life ==
Lyle Thompson is a devout constituent of the Haudenosaunee religion, which emphasizes the Great Spirit, often conceptualized in Haudenosaunee tradition as a single creation entity, also referred to as 'the Creator'. His spirit animal is the eagle. He wears his hair in a braid in accordance with Haudenosaunee tradition. He is bilingual, fluent in both English and Onondaga language. He relearned Mohawk language after his ability to speak it deteriorated after attending public school outside of the reservation.

Lyle has emphasized that he adheres to the Haudenosaunee religious tradition of playing lacrosse primarily to entertain the Creator. In this regard, lacrosse is more than a game, it is salient feature of Haudenosaunee religion and culture. Lyle said in an interview:

It isn't just a game. It isn't just about going out and winning. You hear me talk about that all the time. It's not about winning; it's about having fun and playing with the right mindset and using the game as medicine.

He has expressed concerns about the presence of commercialism in youth sports and a fixated win-at-all costs mentality, which can be counterproductive to the deeper value of participation in sports. He has also expressed concerns that there is a trend amongst some parents of children participating in sports to curtail their children "in a certain direction, overtrain them, push them to the next level or make sure they’re the best on the team... and forget to ask them if they just had fun.”

Lyle is a lifelong teetotaler and abstainer of drugs. He is a drawing artist, and he designed the stylized T logo himself for his company Thompson Brothers, with a braided spine like his family's recognizable hairstyle, one tip up and one tip down. He is also a sneaker collector. He has expressed support for Palestinians in the Israeli–Palestinian conflict.

Lyle Thompson is married to Amanda Longboat; together they have four daughters and one son. Currently, they live on the Six Nations reservation on the Canadian side of the border. His children are homeschooled; Lyle covers the subjects of art and physical education.

== Awards ==
Preceded by Dhane Smith	NLL Most Valuable Player; 2017	Succeeded by Mark Matthews

== See also ==
- 2014 NCAA Division I Men's Lacrosse Championship
- Albany Great Danes men's lacrosse
- Miles Thompson
- Jeremy Thompson
