= Jerome Thompson =

American lacrosse player (born 1988)

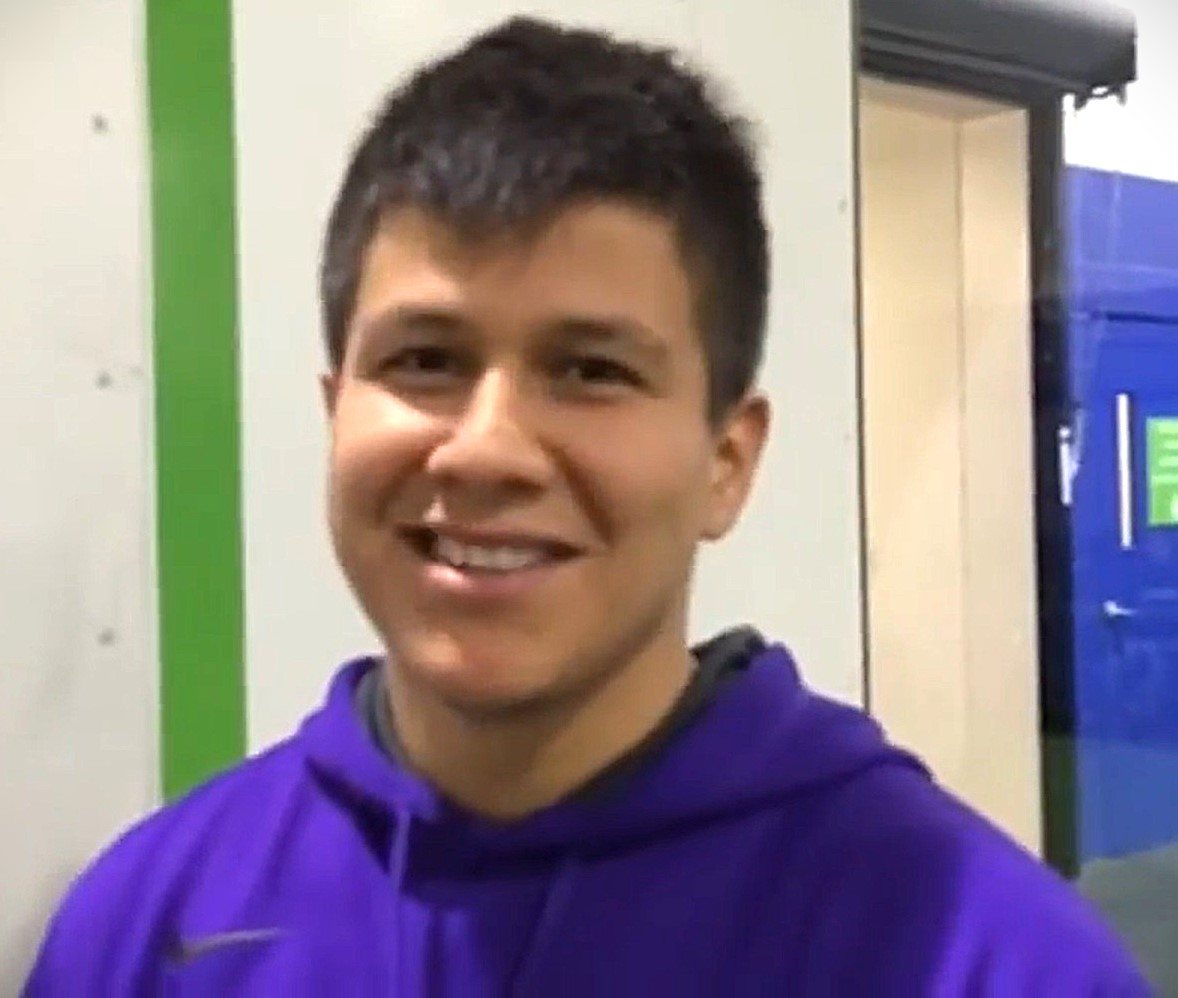
- Thompson in 2015

Personal information
- Nickname: Hiana
- Nationality: Haudenosaunee
- Born: June 4, 1988 (age 38) Nedrow, New York, U.S.
- Height: 5 ft 11 in (180 cm)
- Weight: 194 lb (88 kg; 13 st 12 lb)

Sport
- Position: Forward
- Shoots: Left
- NLL draft: 25th overall, 2011; Buffalo Bandits
- NLL team Former teams: Georgia Swarm; Buffalo Bandits
- Pro career: 2015–2019

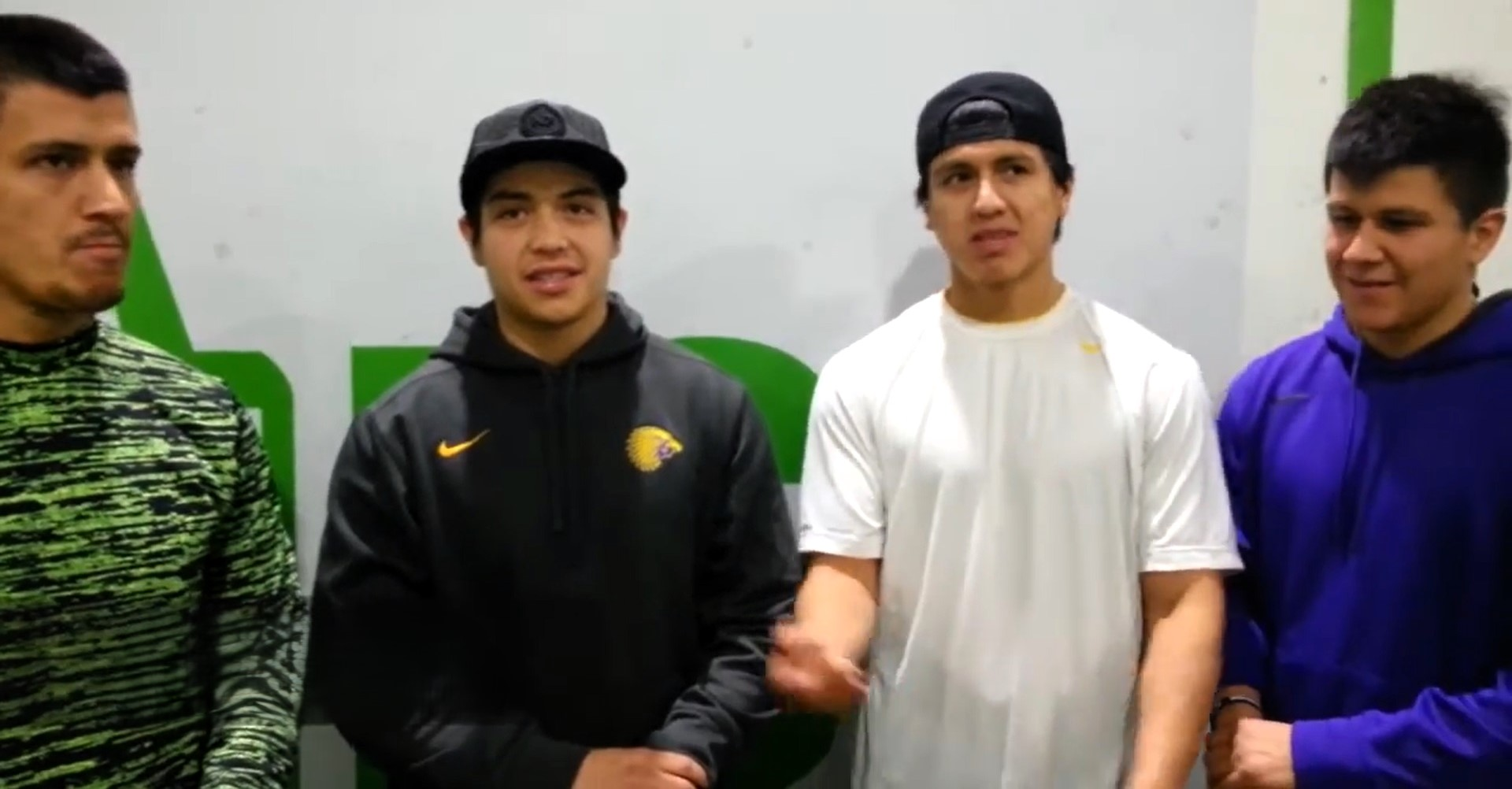
Left to right: Jeremy, Miles, Lyle, and Jerome "Hiana" Thompson in 2015

Jerome "Hiana" Thompson, Jr. (born June 4, 1988) is a Haudenosaunee former professional box lacrosse player from the Hawk Clan of the Onondaga Nation. He plays for the Albany Firewolves of the National Lacrosse League (NLL). Initially drafted by the Buffalo Bandits in 2011, he gained a roster spot for the 2015 NLL season. He is the son of Doloris Thompson, an Onondaga mother, and Jerome Thompson, Sr., a Mohawk father from Akwesasne, and is the brother of fellow NLL players Jeremy, Lyle and Miles. Outside of the NLL, Thompson has played for the St. Regis Braves, Iroquois Ironmen, Onondaga Redhawks, and the Iroquois Nationals.
