= Miles Thompson =

Haudenosaunee lacrosse player (born 1990)

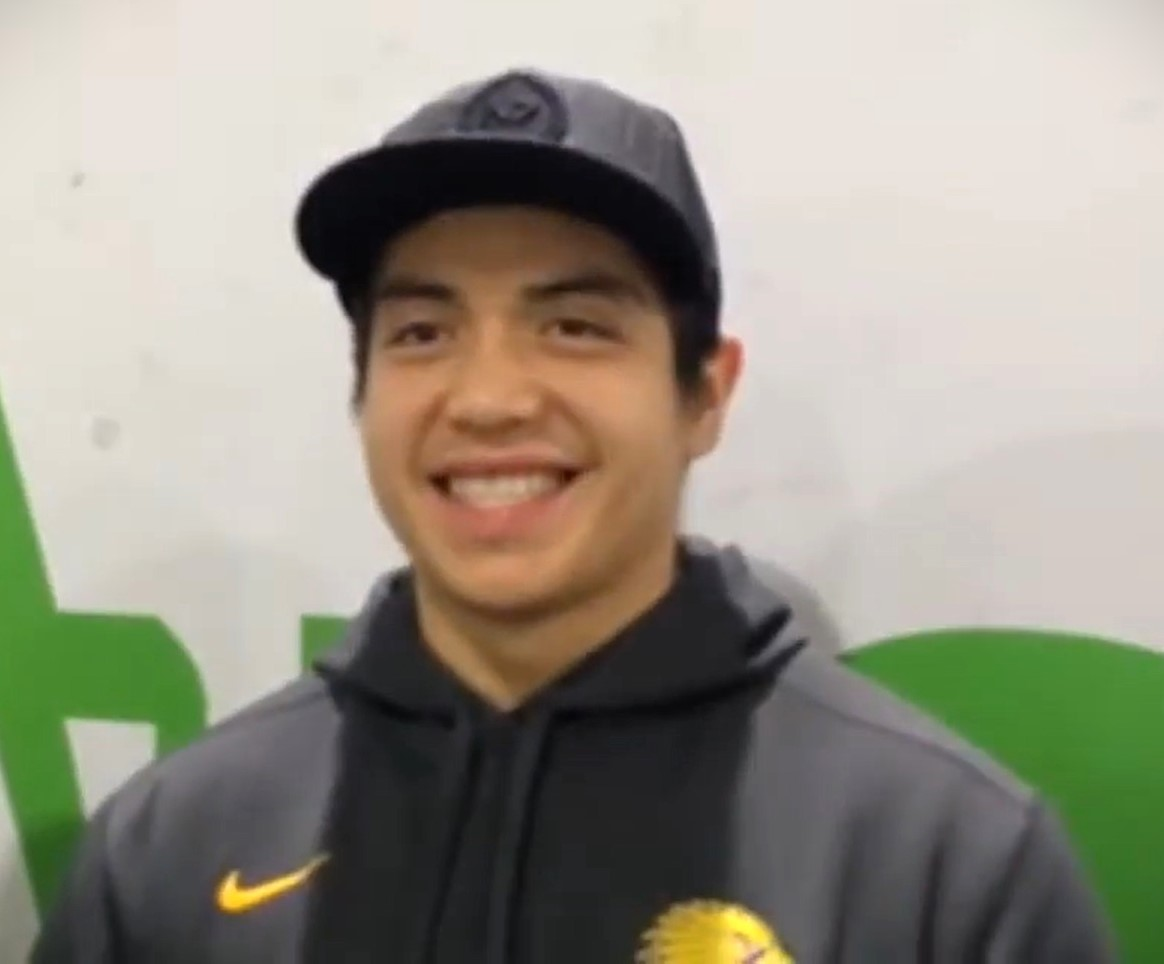
- Thompson in 2015

Personal information
- Nationality: Haudenosaunee
- Born: December 8, 1990 (age 35) Nedrow, New York, U.S.
- Height: 5 ft 11 in (180 cm)
- Weight: 185 lb (84 kg; 13 st 3 lb)

Sport
- Position: Attack
- Shoots: Right
- NLL draft: 3rd overall, 2014; Minnesota Swarm
- NLL team: Georgia Swarm
- MLL draft: 20th overall, 2014; Rochester Rattlers
- PLL team: Carolina Chaos
- Pro career: 2014–

Career highlights
- 2014 Tewaaraton Trophy; 2017 NLL Championship

Miles Thompson (born December 8, 1990) is a Haudenosaunee professional lacrosse player from the Hawk Clan of the Onondaga Nation. He played for the University at Albany in NCAA Division I college lacrosse and plays for the Georgia Swarm in the National Lacrosse League and the Carolina Chaos in the Premier Lacrosse League. He shared the 2014 Tewaaraton Trophy with his brother Lyle.

During that year, that attack line consisting of those two and their cousin, Ty Thompson, dubbed the "Thompson Trio", shattered multiple NCAA Division 1 records, and is widely considered one of the greatest attack lines in college lacrosse history.

== Early life ==
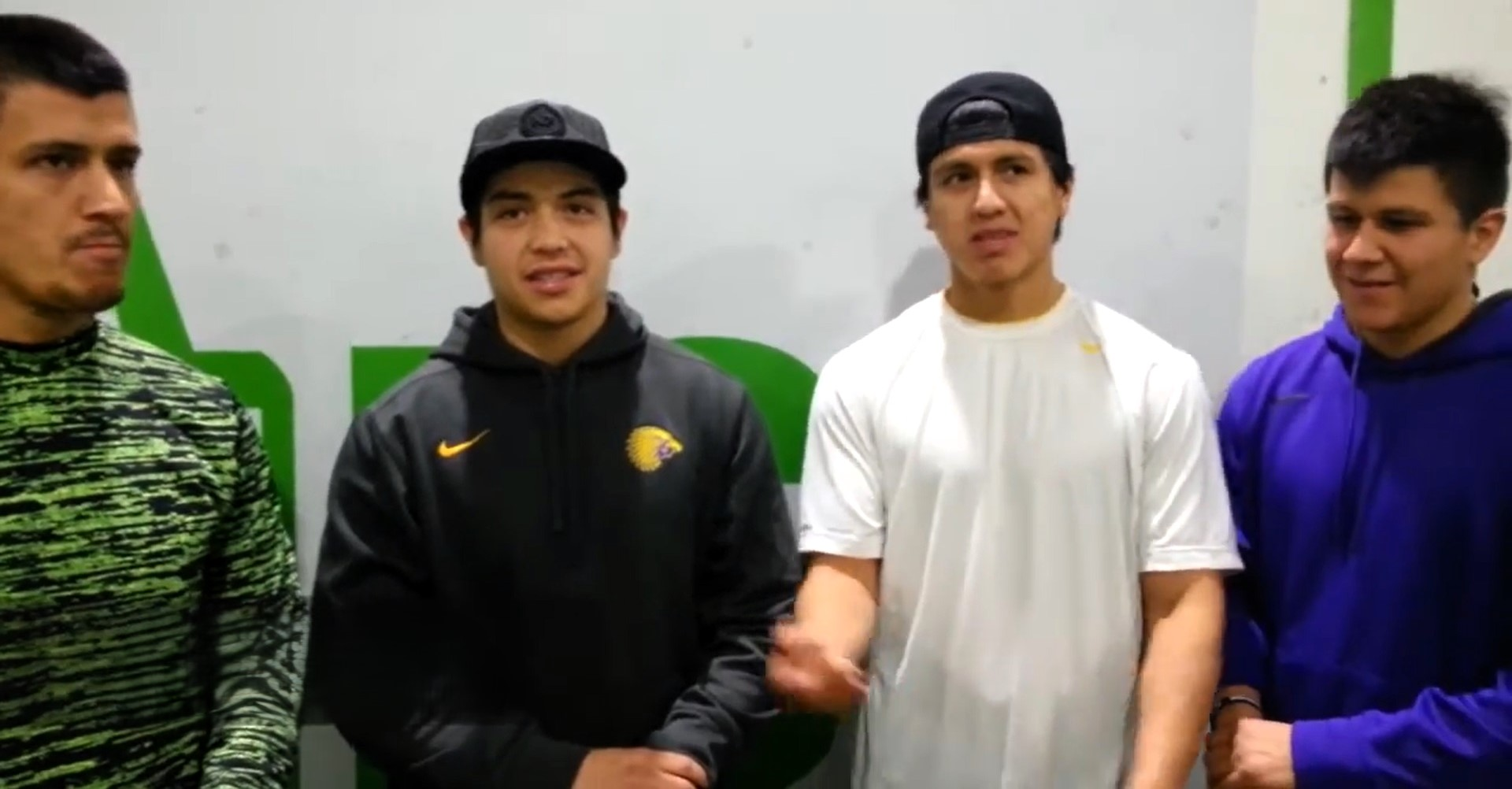
Left to right: Jeremy, Miles, Lyle, and Jerome "Hiana" Thompson in 2015

Miles grew up in the Onondaga Nation with parents Doloris, an Onondaga mother, and Jerome Thompson, a Mohawk father from Akwesasne. He was one of five children in the family, which included brothers Jeremy, Lyle, and Jerome Jr. (Hiana). Miles attended LaFayette High School, outside of Syracuse, New York, and was a standout in their lacrosse program.

== College ==
Miles attended the University at Albany, SUNY, where he played lacrosse with his brother Lyle and cousin Ty Thompson. The three Thompsons all played attack and scored 259 points in 2013. In 2014, Miles and Lyle were the first Native American players to win the Tewaaraton Trophy; tewaaraton is the Mohawk term for the precursor of modern lacrosse. He finished at the University of Albany with 293 total points and holds an NCAA Record for scoring a goal in every game he played in.

== Major League Lacrosse ==
Miles Thompson was drafted in the third round, 20th overall, in the 2014 MLL Draft by the Rochester Rattlers. He was then traded to the Florida Launch and was on the active roster with them in their inaugural season. In 2015, the Launch selected Miles' brother Lyle first overall in the 2015 MLL Draft. The brothers' first game together was against the Ohio Machine.

== National Lacrosse League ==
Miles was drafted third overall in the 2014 NLL draft by the Minnesota Swarm. After his rookie season in Minnesota, the Swarm relocated to Georgia, becoming the Georgia Swarm. Thompson's younger brother Lyle was also drafted by the Swarm the next season, and older brother Jerome was acquired by the Swarm in 2016.

== Premier Lacrosse League ==
Thompson signed with the PLL and was selected to play for the Chaos Lacrosse Club prior to the PLL's inaugural season in 2019.

== International competition ==
As a player for the Iroquois men's national lacrosse team in the 2014 World Lacrosse Championship, Miles helped the Iroquois Nationals place third, their best-ever result in international field lacrosse competition.

Miles played for the Iroquois national indoor lacrosse team at the 2015 World Indoor Lacrosse Championship. The Iroquois won the silver medal, falling to Canada in the final match on September 27, 2015.

Miles again led the Iroquois to a 3rd place finish at the 2018 World Lacrosse Championship.

== NLL career statistics ==
Miles Thompson		Regular season									Playoffs								
Season	Team	GP	G	A	Pts	LB	PIM	Pts/GP	LB/GP	PIM/GP	GP	G	A	Pts	LB	PIM	Pts/GP	LB/GP	PIM/GP
2015	Minnesota Swarm	18	27	35	62	69	7	3.44	3.83	0.39	–	–	–	–	–	–	–	–	–
2016	Georgia Swarm	17	19	17	36	56	9	2.12	3.29	0.53	1	2	0	2	5	0	2.00	5.00	0.00
2017	Georgia Swarm	16	32	25	57	65	11	3.56	4.06	0.69	4	6	4	10	19	0	2.50	4.75	0.00
2018	Georgia Swarm	17	21	22	43	53	8	2.53	3.12	0.47	1	1	1	2	6	0	2.00	6.00	0.00
2019	Georgia Swarm	18	23	20	43	39	12	2.39	2.17	0.67	1	1	1	2	0	0	2.00	0.00	0.00
2020	Georgia Swarm	11	17	16	33	43	6	3.00	3.91	0.55	–	–	–	–	–	–	–	–	–
2022	Georgia Swarm	3	6	2	8	3	0	2.67	1.00	0.00	–	–	–	–	–	–	–	–	–
		100	145	137	282	328	53	2.82	3.28	0.53	7	10	6	16	30	0	2.29	4.29	0.00
Career Total:		107	155	143	298	358	53	2.79	3.35	0.50									

GP–Games played; G–Goals; A–Assists; Pts–Points; LB–Loose balls; PIM–Penalty minutes; Pts/GP–Points per games played; LB/GP–Loose balls per games played; PIM/GP–Penalty minutes per games played.

== PLL career statistics ==
Season	Team	Regular season											Playoffs										
Season	Team	GP	G	2PG	A	Pts	Sh	GB	Pen	PIM	FOW	FOA	GP	G	2PG	A	Pts	Sh	GB	Pen	PIM	FOW	FOA
2019	Chaos LC	6	11	0	6	17	28	7	0	0	0	0	2	2	0	3	5	5	4	0	0	0	0
2020	Chaos LC	7	4	0	1	5	11	0	0	0	0	0	–	–	–	–	–	–	–	–	–	–	–
		13	15	0	7	22	39	7	0	0	0	0	2	2	0	3	5	5	4	0	0	0	0
Career total:		15	17	0	10	27	44	11	0	0	0	0											

GP–Games played; G–Goals; 2PG–2-point goals; A–Assists; Pts–Points; Sh–Shots; GB–Ground balls; Pen–Penalties; PIM–Penalty minutes; FOW–Faceoffs won; FOA–Faceoffs attempted

== See also ==
- 2014 NCAA Division I Men's Lacrosse Championship
- Albany Great Danes men's lacrosse
