= 2026 NLL season =

- League: National Lacrosse League
- Sport: Indoor lacrosse (box lacrosse)
- Duration: November 28, 2025 — May 17, 2026
- Games: 18
- Teams: 14
- TV partner(s): ESPN (United States); TSN (Canada)

Draft
- Top draft pick: CJ Kirst
- Picked by: Toronto Rock

Regular season
- Top seed: Vancouver Warriors
- Season MVP: Brett Dobson (Georgia Swarm)
- Top scorer: Keegan Bal (Vancouver Warriors)

Playoffs
- Finals champions: Toronto Rock
- Runners-up: Halifax Thunderbirds
- Finals MVP: Sam English (Rock)

NLL seasons
- ← 2025 season 2027 season →

The 2026 NLL season was the 39th season of play of the National Lacrosse League (NLL). The season began on November 28, 2025, and ended on May 17, 2026, with the Toronto Rock defeating the Halifax Thunderbirds, 2–0, in the NLL Finals.

== League business ==
On August 19, 2025, the NLL announced that the Albany FireWolves would relocate to Oshawa, and be renamed the Oshawa FireWolves for competition in the 2026 season.

== Teams ==
2026 National Lacrosse League
Team	City	Arena	Capacity
Buffalo Bandits	Buffalo, New York	KeyBank Center	19,070
Calgary Roughnecks	Calgary, Alberta	Scotiabank Saddledome	19,289
Colorado Mammoth	Denver, Colorado	Ball Arena	18,000
Georgia Swarm	Duluth, Georgia	Gas South Arena	10,500
Halifax Thunderbirds	Halifax, Nova Scotia	Scotiabank Centre	10,595
Las Vegas Desert Dogs	Henderson, Nevada	Lee's Family Forum	5,567
Oshawa FireWolves	Oshawa, Ontario	Tribute Communities Centre	5,180
Ottawa Black Bears	Ottawa, Ontario	Canadian Tire Centre	18,655
Philadelphia Wings	Philadelphia, Pennsylvania	Xfinity Mobile Arena	19,306
Rochester Knighthawks	Rochester, New York	Blue Cross Arena	10,662
San Diego Seals	San Diego, California	Pechanga Arena	12,920
Saskatchewan Rush	Saskatoon, Saskatchewan	SaskTel Centre	15,195
Toronto Rock	Hamilton, Ontario	TD Coliseum	18,000
Vancouver Warriors	Vancouver, British Columbia	Rogers Arena	18,910

=== Map of teams ===
NLL Teams

== Regular season ==
P	Team	GP	W	L	PCT	GB	Home	Road	GF	GA	Diff	GF/GP	GA/GP
1	Vancouver Warriors – xz	18	13	5	.722	0.0	6–3	7–2	200	170	+30	11.11	9.44
2	Colorado Mammoth – x	18	12	6	.667	1.0	7–2	5–4	206	179	+27	11.44	9.94
3	Saskatchewan Rush – x	18	12	6	.667	1.0	7–2	5–4	206	176	+30	11.44	9.78
4	Georgia Swarm – x	18	12	6	.667	1.0	5–4	7–2	193	156	+37	10.72	8.67
5	Buffalo Bandits – x	18	11	7	.611	2.0	6–3	5–4	199	183	+16	11.06	10.17
6	Toronto Rock – x	18	11	7	.611	2.0	6–3	5–4	195	186	+9	10.83	10.33
7	San Diego Seals – x	18	8	10	.444	5.0	3–6	5–4	185	191	−6	10.28	10.61
8	Halifax Thunderbirds – x	18	8	10	.444	5.0	4–5	4–5	187	182	+5	10.39	10.11
9	Las Vegas Desert Dogs	18	8	10	.444	5.0	6–3	2–7	219	229	−10	12.17	12.72
10	Ottawa Black Bears	18	8	10	.444	5.0	4–5	4–5	185	203	−18	10.28	11.28
11	Calgary Roughnecks	18	6	12	.333	7.0	3–6	3–6	187	205	−18	10.39	11.39
12	Rochester Knighthawks	18	6	12	.333	7.0	3–6	3–6	205	239	−34	11.39	13.28
13	Oshawa FireWolves	18	6	12	.333	7.0	4–5	2–7	179	212	−33	9.94	11.78
14	Philadelphia Wings	18	5	13	.278	8.0	3–6	2–7	165	200	−35	9.17	11.11

== Scoring leaders ==
Note: GP = Games played; G = Goals; A = Assists; Pts = Points; PIM = Penalty minutes; LB = Loose Balls

Player	Team	GP	G	A	Pts	PIM	LB
Keegan Bal	Vancouver Warriors	18	45	79	124	6	106
Connor Fields	Rochester Knighthawks	18	41	78	119	12	135
Dhane Smith	Buffalo Bandits	18	39	79	118	6	86
Jeff Teat	Ottawa Black Bears	18	44	71	115	0	119
Josh Byrne	Buffalo Bandits	18	36	77	113	8	64
Alex Simmons	Oshawa FireWolves	18	41	68	109	20	119
Ryan Lanchbury	Rochester Knighthawks	18	24	82	106	16	82
Jonathan Donville	Las Vegas Desert Dogs	18	27	78	105	10	98
Mitchell Jones	Las Vegas Desert Dogs	18	35	69	104	10	93
Tyler Pace	Calgary Roughnecks	18	31	72	103	2	46

== Leading goaltenders ==
Note: GP = Games played; Mins = Minutes played; W = Wins; L = Losses: GA = Goals Allowed; SV% = Save Percentage; GAA = Goals against average

Player	Team	GP	Mins	W	L	GA	SV%	GAA
Brett Dobson	Georgia Swarm	18	1022	11	6	134	0.847	7.86
Nick Rose	Toronto Rock	12	608	7	3	93	0.815	9.17
Christian Del Bianco	Vancouver Warriors	18	1062	13	5	166	0.814	9.38
Frankie Scigliano	Saskatchewan Rush	18	1024	12	5	161	0.789	9.43
Matt Vinc	Buffalo Bandits	18	1054	11	7	173	0.791	9.85

== Awards ==
=== Annual awards ===
Reference for nominees:

Reference for winners:

Award	Winner	Other finalists
Most Valuable Player	Brett Dobson, Georgia Swarm	Keegan Bal, Vancouver Warriors; Dhane Smith, Buffalo Bandits
Goaltender of the Year	Brett Dobson, Georgia Swarm	Christian Del Bianco, Vancouver Warriors; Dillon Ward, Colorado Mammoth
Defensive Player of the Year	Callum Jones, Ottawa Black Bears	Ryan Dilks, Vancouver Warriors; Brad Kri, Toronto Rock
Transition Player of the Year	Zach Currier, San Diego Seals	Sam English, Toronto Rock; Jordan MacIntosh, Georgia Swarm
Offensive Player of the Year	Keegan Bal, Vancouver Warriors	Andrew Kew, Colorado Mammoth; Dhane Smith, Buffalo Bandits
Rookie of the Year	CJ Kirst, Toronto Rock	Nolan Byrne, Georgia Swarm; Michael Grace, Georgia Swarm
Sportsmanship Award	Ryan Keenan, Saskatchewan Rush	Kyle Buchanan, Buffalo Bandits; Jeff Teat, Ottawa Black Bears
GM of the Year	Brad Self, Colorado Mammoth	Jamie Dawick, Toronto Rock; Curt Malawsky, Vancouver Warriors
Les Bartley Award	Pat Coyle, Colorado Mammoth	Ed Comeau, Georgia Swarm; Curt Malawsky, Vancouver Warriors
Executive of the Year Award		Dax Aquilini, Vancouver Warriors; Dan Carey, Rochester Knighthawks; Jonah Haas, Las Vegas Desert Dogs
Teammate of the Year Award	Luc Magnan, Ottawa Black Bears	Robert Hope, Colorado Mammoth; Cam Dunkerley, San Diego Seals
Tom Borrelli Award		Ashley Docking, Toronto Rock, TSN; Maki Jenner, Halifax Thunderbirds, TSN; Graeme Perrow, NLL Chatter

== Playoffs ==
Quarterfinal
1	Vancouver	7
8	Halifax	10
4	Georgia	17
5	Buffalo	10
2	Colorado	12
7	San Diego	13*
3	Saskatchewan	13
6	Toronto	16

Semifinal (best of 3)
8	Halifax	2
4	Georgia	1
7	San Diego	1
6	Toronto	2

NLL Final (best of 3)
6	Toronto	2
8	Halifax	0

*Overtime

=== Quarterfinals ===
==== (1) Vancouver Warriors vs. (8) Halifax Thunderbirds ====
April 24, 2026	Vancouver Warriors	7–10 (2–1, 5–0, 0–6, 0–3)	Halifax Thunderbirds	Rogers Arena; Attendance: 9,073

Game reference

Christian Del Bianco
Goalies
Warren Hill

Klarich (Bal, Charalambides) – 07:28	1–0
King (Simpson, Dilks) – 10:19	2–0
	2–1	14:01 – Knox (Bomberry)
Dickson (Bal, King) (PP) – 21:07	3–1
Bal (King, Dickson) (SH) – 22:54	4–1
Klarich (Charalambides, Bal) – 24:42	5–1
Bal (King) – 24:51	6–1
Bal (King) – 29:04	7–1
	7–2	38:14 – Jamieson (Petterson, C. Wilson) (PP)
	7–3	40:48 – Knox (C. Wilson, Withers)
	7–4	41:31 – Knox (Armstrong)
	7–5	42:46 – Petterson (Jamieson, Knox) (PP)
	7–6	43:50 – Knox (Jamieson, Petterson) (PP)
	7–7	44:35 – Robinson (Petterson, Bomberry)
	7–8	48:53 – Withers
	7–9	53:58 – Petterson (Terefenko, Withers)
	7–10	53:54 – Robinson (Knox, Terefenko)

28 min
Penalties
20 min
43
Shots
71

==== (4) Georgia Swarm vs. (5) Buffalo Bandits ====
April 25, 2026	Georgia Swarm	17–10 (3–1, 6–4, 3–1, 5–4)	Buffalo Bandits	Gas South Arena; Attendance: 4,134

Game reference

Brett Dobson
Goalies
Matt Vinc
Evan Constantopoulos

Thompson (Byrne, Hickey) – 00:40	1–0
	1–1	06:14 – Robinson (Dooley)
Benedict (Cole, Van Schepen) – 07:13	2–1
Benedict (Thompson, Henrick) – 11:31	3–1
Byrne (Moon, Connell) – 16:18	4–1
	4–2	17:27 – MacKay (Byrne, de Snoo)
Byrne (Benedict, Thompson) (PP) – 19:44	5–2
Jackson (Moon, Wiedemann) – 20:50	6–2
Byrne (Thompson) (PP) – 21:33	7–2
Jackson (Thompson, Moon) – 22:00	8–2
	8–3	24:48 – Scanlan (MacKay)
Connell (Moon, MacIntosh) – 27:05	9–3
	9–4	28:07 – Wyers
	9–5	29:47 – de Snoo
Thompson (Cole, Jackson) – 31:38	10–5
	10–6	36:41 – Resetarits (MacKay, Byrne)
Trumble (Tabell) – 41:05	11–6
Cole (Moon, Byrne) – 44:22	12–6
Thompson (Moon, Cole) – 46:26	13–6
Connell (Benedict, Thompson) – 47:37	14–6
Thompson (Connell, Jackson) – 49:00	15–6
	15–7	49:52 – MacKay (Smith, Byrne) (PP)
	15–8	51:45 – MacKay (Resetarits, Smith)
Jackson (Thompson, Benedict) (PP) – 54:58	16–8
Connell (Byrne, Benedict) – 55:50	17–8
	17–9	59:01 – Buchanan (Resetarits, Byrne)
	17–10	59:14 – Byrne (Nanticoke, Smith)

8 min
Penalties
4 min
53
Shots
46

==== (2) Colorado Mammoth vs. (7) San Diego Seals ====
April 25, 2026	Colorado Mammoth	12–13 OT (3–3, 3–2, 5–4, 1–3, 0–1)	San Diego Seals	Ball Arena; Attendance: 8,991

Game reference

Dillon Ward
Goalies
Christopher Origlieri

McIntosh (Malcom, Vela) – 01:23	1–0
	1–1	03:59 – Currier (McIntosh, Berg)
	1–2	05:19 – McIntosh (Currier)
Malcom (Saris) – 07:28	2–2
	2–3	07:48 – Watson (Currier, Gobrecht)
Kew (Malcom, Hannah) – 08:55	3–3
	3–4	17:16 – Currier (Armitage)
Gilles – 17:29	4–4
Kew (Vela, Saris) – 18:48	5–4
Kew (Malcom) – 29:51	6–4
	6–5	29:57 – Gobrecht (Baptiste)
Saris (Kew, McIntosh) – 32:19	7–5
Hannah (Kew, Malcom) – 34:01	8–5
	8–6	34:56 – Berg (Watson, Armitage)
McIntosh (Hannah, Malcom) – 35:40	9–6
Kew (Hannah, Malcom) – 38:11	10–6
	10–7	40:04 – Currier (Leclaire, Barclay)
Malcom (Saris, Kew) (PP) – 42:19	11–7
	11–8	43:14 – Watson (Berg, Steenhuis)
	11–9	43:29 – Berg (McIntosh, Currier)
	11–10	52:46 – Leclaire (Robinson, Armitage)
	11–11	54:27 – Watson (Berg, DiCicco)
	11–12	55:20 – Berg (Currier)
McIntosh (Rahn, Malcom) – 56:05	12–12
	12–13	60:59 – Leclaire (Berg)

14 min
Penalties
8 min
45
Shots
68

* Note: When Tre Leclaire scored the game-winning goal in overtime, he had received a pass from Wesley Berg after exiting the crease, which violated League Rules 67.3 and 17.81. A day later, NLL commissioner Brett Frood released a statement that said the goal should have been disallowed and possession should have been awarded to Colorado, and the officials working the game were suspended for the remainder of the playoffs.

==== (3) Saskatchewan Rush vs. (6) Toronto Rock ====
April 25, 2026	Saskatchewan Rush	13–16 (2–6, 5–2, 2–3, 4–5)	Toronto Rock	SaskTel Centre; Attendance: 5,653

Game reference

Frankie Scigliano
Thomas Kiazyk
Goalies
Nick Rose

	0–1	02:23 – Dawick (Craig, Matthews)
Shanks (Church) – 03:17	1–1
	1–2	06:41 – Kirst (Kri)
	1–3	07:17 – Boushy (English)
Church (Boudreau, Messenger) – 07:53	2–3
	2–4	09:52 – Boushy (Dawick, Rogers)
	2–5	11:16 – Boushy (Dawick, Hiltz)
	2–6	11:34 – Dawick (Hiltz, Matthews)
Anderson (Messenger) – 22:31	3–6
Keenan (Church) – 23:02	4–6
	4–7	24:18 – Kirst (Matthews, Rogers) (PP)
McClelland (Barnable) – 24:31	5–7
Barnable – 25:23	6–7
Church (Manns, Shanks) (PP) – 27:17	7–7
	7–8	29:22 – Harris
Haley (Jay, Boudreau) – 30:17	8–8
Church (Shanks, Manns) – 33:23	9–8
	9–9	35:11 – Dawick (Matthews) (PP)
	9–10	38:23 – Boushy (Hiltz)
	9–11	44:56 – Matthews (Hostrawser)
	9–12	47:00 – Kelleher
Church (Anderson, Shanks) – 47:14	10–12
	10–13	48:41 – Gash
	10–14	52:48 – Boushy (Hiltz)
	10–15	53:37 – Kirst (Dawick, Boushy)
Keenan (Shanks, Church) – 55:19	11–15
	11–16	56:52 – Kri (ENG)
Shanks (Manns, Haley) – 58:54	12–16
Shanks (Anderson) – 59:17	13–16

4 min
Penalties
4 min
62
Shots
48

=== Semifinals ===
==== (6) Toronto Rock vs. (7) San Diego Seals ====
May 1, 2026	Toronto Rock	14–12 (4–1, 2–5, 3–3, 5–3)	San Diego Seals	TD Coliseum; Attendance: 5,541

Game reference

Nick Rose
Goalies
Christopher Origlieri
Cameron Dunkerley

English – 05:05	1–0
	1–1	07:47 – Watson (Currier, Berg)
Matthews (Rogers, Craig) – 09:37	2–1
Rogers (Rose) – 10:08	3–1
Hiltz (Kelleher, Jubenville) – 10:42	4–1
	4–2	16:32 – Watson (McIntosh, Leclaire)
	4–3	17:44 – Leclaire (Currier, Watson)
Boushy (Dawick, Hiltz) – 18:50	5–3
	5–4	19:40 – Armitage (Berg, DiCicco)
	5–5	20:58 – Leclaire (Currier)
Boushy (Jubenville) – 22:12	6–5
	6–6	25:20 – Robinson (Berg, Bradley)
Matthews (Harris, Rose) (SH) – 31:34	7–6
Craig (Jubenville, Kelleher) – 38:22	8–6
English – 38:32	9–6
	9–7	39:51 – Currier (Leclaire, Berg)
	9–8	41:02 – McIntosh (Armitage, Steenhuis)
	9–9	44:30 – Leclaire (Berg, Watson)
Hiltz (Matthews, Dawick) (PP) – 46:10	10–9
	10–10	47:12 – Robinson (Berg, Leclaire) (PP)
	10–11	49:26 – McIntosh (Leclaire)
Rogers (Boushy, Dawick) – 50:28	11–11
Matthews (Rogers, English) – 58:27	12–11
Rogers (English, Jubenville) – 58:52	13–11
	13–12	59:13 – McIntosh (Robinson, Berg)
English (Rose) (ENG) – 59:37	14–12

9 min
Penalties
8 min
46
Shots
56

May 3, 2026	San Diego Seals	11–6 (2–1, 2–0, 4–1, 3–4)	Toronto Rock	Pechanga Arena; Attendance: 5,643

Game reference

Cameron Dunkerley
Tyden Redlick
Goalies
Nick Rose
Troy Holowchuk

	0–1	01:17 – Rogers (Boushy, Kri)
Watson (Currier, McIntosh) – 07:24	1–1
Watson (Berg) – 10:55	2–1
Robinson (Leclaire, Berg) (PP) – 18:39	3–1
Leclaire (Berg) – 28:15	4–1
Berg (Robinson, Leclaire) – 33:29	5–1
Currier (McIntosh, Leclaire) – 35:23	6–1
Barclay (DiCicco) – 38:31	7–1
	7–2	38:55 – Boushy (Hiltz, Kirst)
Watson (Leclaire, DiCicco) – 39:26	8–2
	8–3	45:50 – Kirst (Kelleher) (SH)
Robinson (Currier, Berg) – 46:52	9–3
	9–4	47:18 – Matthews (Kirst, Dawick)
Watson (Berg) – 52:22	10–4
	10–5	54:29 – Hiltz (SH)
Gobrecht (DiCicco) (PP, ENG) – 55:29	11–5
	11–6	59:10 – Boushy (Dawick, Rogers)

28 min
Penalties
52 min
52
Shots
42

May 9, 2026	Toronto Rock	14–8 (4–1, 0–4, 5–1, 5–2)	San Diego Seals	TD Coliseum; Attendance: 5,263

Game reference

Nick Rose
Goalies
Cameron Dunkerley

Kri (Rose) – 02:14	1–0
English (Kri) – 07:59	2–0
Craig (Hostrawser) – 09:04	3–0
Kelleher – 09:26	4–0
	4–1	10:56 – Currier (Armitage)
	4–2	17:44 – Berg (Currier)
	4–3	25:51 – McIntosh (Berg, Robinson) (PP)
	4–4	26:29 – Steenhuis (Currier)
	4–5	28:18 – Currier (Robinson)
Kelleher (English, Rose) – 32:12	5–5
	5–6	39:56 – Currier (PP)
Kirst (Dawick, English) – 40:44	6–6
Boushy (Kirst, Kri) – 43:12	7–6
Kirst – 44:11	8–6
Boushy (Matthews, Rogers) – 44:56	9–6
English – 46:55	10–6
Matthews (Craig, Hostrawser) – 51:10	11–6
	11–7	51:20 – Baptiste
Hiltz (Kirst, Kelleher) – 51:59	12–7
Hiltz (Matthews, Jackson) – 52:28	13–7
	13–8	53:37 – Leclaire (Robinson, Currier) (PP)
Jackson (English) (PP, ENG) – 58:47	14–8

12 min
Penalties
6 min
46
Shots
61

Rock wins series 2–1.

==== (4) Georgia Swarm vs. (8) Halifax Thunderbirds ====
May 2, 2026	Georgia Swarm	7–12 (2–1, 2–4, 2–4, 1–3)	Halifax Thunderbirds	Gas South Arena; Attendance: 4,118

Game reference

Brett Dobson
Goalies
Warren Hill

Connell (Jackson, Thompson) – 01:18	1–0
	1–1	09:06 – Knox (Robinson, Petterson)
Manley (Hickey) – 10:15	2–1
MacIntosh (Hickey, Van Schepen) – 15:16	3–1
Thompson (Jackson, Henrick) – 15:49	4–1
	4–2	18:26 – Bomberry (Knox, Petterson)
	4–3	21:23 – Petterson (C. Wilson, Knox)
	4–4	22:01 – Keogh (Robinson)
	4–5	28:02 – Knox (Petterson, C. Wilson)
	4–6	30:28 – Knox (Petterson, Jamieson) (PP)
Connell (Wiedemann, Manley) – 31:01	5–6
	5–7	38:06 – Keogh (Jamieson, C. Wilson)
	5–8	38:36 – C. Wilson (Petterson)
	5–9	39:36 – Bomberry (Petterson)
Benedict (Thompson, Jackson) (PP) – 44:56	6–9
Jackson (Tarbell) – 50:38	7–9
	7–10	52:26 – Pearson (O'Connor)
	7–11	52:49 – Knox (Jamieson, Petterson)
	7–12	58:09 – Petterson (Terefenko) (ENG)

6 min
Penalties
6 min
42
Shots
65

May 9, 2026	Halifax Thunderbirds	10–21 (2–5, 5–6, 1–5, 2–5)	Georgia Swarm	Scotiabank Centre; Attendance: 10,995

Game reference

Warren Hill
Drew Hutchinson
Goalies
Brett Dobson
Devlin Shanahan

	0–1	01:07 – Henrick (McGrath)
Jamieson (Petterson, C. Wilson) – 04:23	1–1
	1–2	05:45 – Connell (Thompson, Dobson) (SH)
Robinson (Petterson) (PP) – 06:07	2–2
	2–3	07:58 – Cole (Wiedemann, Hickey)
	2–4	10:29 – Jackson (Benedict, Thompson)
	2–5	12:15 – Thompson (Benedict, Byrne) (PP)
	2–6	17:13 – Thompson (Cole)
	2–7	17:58 – Benedict (MacIntosh, Manley)
C. Wilson (Petterson, Jamieson) – 19:54	3–7
	3–8	20:57 – Benedict (Connell, Thompson)
Knox (Jamieson, Petterson) – 22:40	4–8
Jamieson (Petterson, Terefenko) – 22:49	5–8
	5–9	25:37 – Byrne (Benedict, Jackson)
Knox (Petterson, Jamieson) – 26:09	6–9
Robinson (Petterson, Jamieson) – 26:32	7–9
	7–10	28:24 – Byrne (Jackson, Benedict) (PP)
	7–11	29:59 – Byrne (Jackson, Thompson)
	7–12	30:41 – Byrne (Wiedemann, Manley)
Knox (Robinson, Petterson) – 33:24	8–12
	8–13	34:28 – Moon (Benedict, Jackson)
	8–14	39:31 – Thompson (Cole, Jackson)
	8–15	42:47 – Jackson (Cole) (PP)
	8–16	43:01 – Henrick (Wiedemann, Hickey)
	8–17	46:08 – Connell (Thompson, Trumble)
	8–18	46:54 – Benedict (Jackson, Cole)
	8–19	50:29 – MacIntosh (Dobson)
Bomberry (Petterson, Jamieson) – 50:49	9–19
	9–20	52:10 – Thompson (Jackson, Cole)
	9–21	53:59 – Jackson (Benedict, Moon) (PP)
Knox (Terefenko, Smyth) – 58:04	10–21

16 min
Penalties
6 min
55
Shots
51

May 10, 2026	Halifax Thunderbirds	15–11 (7–6, 2–2, 2–0, 4–3)	Georgia Swarm	Scotiabank Centre; Attendance: 7,482

Game reference

Warren Hill
Goalies
Brett Dobson

	0–1	02:32 – Moon (Benedict, Jackson)
Jamieson (Romanchych, Withers) – 02:44	1–1
	1–2	04:47 – Eccleston (Jackson)
	1–3	05:30 – Jackson (Hickey, Wiedemann)
C. Wilson (Petterson, Knox) – 06:47	2–3
Jamieson (Robinson, Terefenko) – 07:03	3–3
	3–4	07:50 – Jackson (Benedict, Wiedemann)
Bomberry (Petterson, Staats) – 08:44	4–4
BowHunter (Petterson, Jamieson) – 09:06	5–4
	5–5	09:55 – Hickey (Tarbell) (SH)
Staats (Knox, Robinson) (PP) – 11:11	6–5
Knox (Petterson, Jamieson) (PP)	7–5
	7–6	13:08 – Connell (Cole, Thompson)
Knox (Staats, Petterson) – 17:21	8–6
	8–7	19:52 – Jackson (Benedict, Eccleston) (PP)
Robinson (Staats, C. Wilson) – 24:00	9–7
	9–8	25:32 – Eccleston (Thompson, Jackson)
Petterson (Jamieson) – 34:09	10–8
BowHunter (Robinson) – 35:31	11–8
	11–9	50:19 – Tarbell (Connell)
Knox (Petterson) (PP) – 50:43	12–9
Bomberry (Knox, Staats) (PP) – 51:38	13–9
	13–10	53:45 – Cole (Thompson) (PP)
Petterson (Armstrong, Hossack) – 57:51	14–10
	14–11	58:47 – Cole (Thompson, Henrick)
Terefenko (Petterson, Withers) (ENG) – 59:01	15–11

12 min
Penalties
24 min
57
Shots
48

* Note: In game two, the Georgia Swarm scored 21 goals, breaking an NLL record for most goals scored by a team in a single playoff game.

Thunderbirds win series 2–1.

=== NLL Finals ===
==== (6) Toronto Rock vs. (8) Halifax Thunderbirds ====
May 15, 2026	Toronto Rock	13–11 (3–4, 2–5, 4–0, 4–2)	Halifax Thunderbirds	TD Coliseum; Attendance: 7,812

Game reference

Nick Rose
Goalies
Warren Hill

Craig (Dawick, Matthews) – 04:04	1–0
Hiltz (Matthews, English) – 04:28	2–0
	2–1	04:56 – BowHunter (Knox, Robinson)
	2–2	08:47 – Robinson (C. Wilson, Bomberry)
	2–3	11:10 – Knox (Keogh, Petterson)
	2–4	11:33 – Petterson (Bomberry, BowHunter)
Matthews (Hiltz) – 12:59	3–4
	3–5	15:07 – Withers
	3–6	15:25 – Knox (Jamieson)
Kirst (English, Hostrawser) – 21:53	4–6
	4–7	26:43 – C. Wilson (Bomberry, BowHunter)
	4–8	27:15 – Keogh (Petterson, Robinson)
	4–9	27:33 – Knox (Jamieson)
Kirst (Kelleher, English) – 27:53	5–9
Kirst (Boushy, Dawick) – 31:10	6–9
Kirst (Hiltz) – 34:14	7–9
Dawick (Craig, Kirst) – 37:30	8–9
Boushy (Rogers, Kirst) – 41:13	9–9
Rogers (Matthews) (PP) – 47:04	10–9
	10–10	52:15 – Jamieson (Petterson) (PP)
	10–11	53:19 – Jamieson (Terefenko, Pearson)
Hiltz (Rowlett) – 53:33	11–11
English (Rogers) – 54:19	12–11
English (ENG) – 59:43	13–11

8 min
Penalties
6 min
49
Shots
58

May 17, 2026	Halifax Thunderbirds	7–12 (3–5, 3–3, 1–1, 0–3)	Toronto Rock	Scotiabank Centre; Attendance: 10,889

Game reference

Warren Hill
Drew Hutchison
Goalies
Nick Rose

	0–1	01:56 – English
	0–2	02:42 – Hiltz (Kirst, Boushy)
Petterson (Robinson, Jamieson) – 03:47	1–2
Staats (Jamieson, Knox) (PP) – 06:48	2–2
	2–3	07:36 – Hucal (Gash)
	2–4	12:36 – Boushy (Matthews, Rogers)
Petterson (Robinson, Terefenko) – 13:43	3–4
	3–5	14:24 – Matthews (Hucal, Kelleher)
Petterson (Withers, Hossack) – 16:35	4–5
Robinson (Staats, Bomberry) – 17:49	5–5
Jamieson (Knox) (PP) – 18:49	6–5
	6–6	26:12 – Boushy (Matthews, Rogers) (PP)
	6–7	28:05 – Kelleher
	6–8	29:58 – Hiltz (Matthews, Dawick)
Bomberry (C. Wilson, Petterson) – 31:28	7–8
	7–9	34:28 – Hiltz (English)
	7–10	54:22 – Kirst (Craig, Rogers)
	7–11	58:10 – Boushy (Hiltz, Dawick)
	7–12	59:15 – Harris (ENG)

6 min
Penalties
4 min
41
Shots
52

Rock wins series 2–0.

== Stadiums and locations ==
Georgia Swarm	Ottawa Black Bears	Oshawa FireWolves	Philadelphia Wings
Gas South Arena	Canadian Tire Centre	Tribute Communities Centre	Xfinity Mobile Arena
Capacity: 11,355	Capacity: 18,655	Capacity: 5,180	Capacity: 19,543

Buffalo Bandits	Halifax Thunderbirds	Rochester Knighthawks	Toronto Rock
KeyBank Center	Scotiabank Centre	Blue Cross Arena	TD Coliseum
Capacity: 19,070	Capacity: 10,595	Capacity: 11,200	Capacity: 17,383

Calgary Roughnecks	Colorado Mammoth	San Diego Seals	Saskatchewan Rush
WestJet Field at Scotiabank Saddledome	Ball Arena	Pechanga Arena	Co-op Field at SaskTel Centre
Capacity: 19,289	Capacity: 18,007	Capacity: 12,920	Capacity: 15,190

Vancouver Warriors	Las Vegas Desert Dogs
Rogers Arena	Lee's Family Forum
Capacity: 18,910	Capacity: 5,567

=== Regular season ===
Home team	Home games	Average attendance	Total attendance
Buffalo Bandits	9	18,290	164,614
Calgary Roughnecks	9	11,650	104,489
Halifax Thunderbirds	9	10,338	93,041
Vancouver Warriors	9	9,690	87,214
Colorado Mammoth	9	9,599	86,391
Toronto Rock	9	6,923	62,308
San Diego Seals	9	6,616	59,542
Saskatchewan Rush	9	6,475	58,278
Philadelphia Wings	9	6,420	57,776
Rochester Knighthawks	9	5,643	50,787
Oshawa FireWolves	9	5,538	49,841
Las Vegas Desert Dogs	9	5,078	45,700
Georgia Swarm	9	4,919	44,275
Ottawa Black Bears	9	4,651	41,863
League	126	7,985	1,006,119

=== Playoffs ===
Home team	Home games	Average attendance	Total attendance
Halifax Thunderbirds	3	9,789	29,366
Toronto Rock	3	6,205	18,616
Vancouver Warriors	1	9,073	9,073
Colorado Mammoth	1	8,991	8,991
Georgia Swarm	2	4,126	8,252
Saskatchewan Rush	1	5,653	5,653
San Diego Seals	1	5,643	5,643
League	12	7,133	85,594

=== Announcing ===
On February 14, 2026, Maki Jenner did play-by-play for the Halifax Thunderbirds in a game in Halifax between them and the Buffalo Bandits, which made her the first woman to do play-by-play for the NLL.

== See also ==
- 2026 in sports
