= Tom Borrelli Award =

The Tom Borrelli Award is presented by the National Lacrosse League to the league's "Media Person of the Year". The award was originally awarded to the Writer of the Year, but "was changed to Media Person of the Year in 2011 to allow for a wider range of media members to be considered for the award, including broadcasters."

The award is named for Tom Borrelli (1957–2008), a writer for The Buffalo News who covered the Buffalo Bandits from the team's inception in 1992 to his death in 2008. He was inducted into the National Lacrosse League Hall of Fame in 2007.

The award was created at the end of the 2005 season and, surprisingly, Borrelli was never a recipient. However, Tom Borrelli was the first sportswriter inducted into the NLL Hall of Fame.

In 2009, The Buffalo News began awarding a lacrosse scholarship and trophy named for Tom Borrelli to the top high school lacrosse player in Western New York. The inaugural Tom Borrelli Memorial Award winner was Jeff Tundo of Orchard Park, who played collegiately at Ohio State and Stony Brook.

== Past winners ==
Season	Winner	Media Outlet	Win #	Other finalists
2026	Graeme Perrow	NLLStats.com	1	Ashley Docking, TSN; Maki Jenner, Halifax Thunderbirds, TSN, "Box Out" podcast
2025	John Gurtler	Buffalo Bandits	1	Maki Jenner, Halifax Thunderbirds, TSN, "Box Out" podcast Teddy Jenner, TSN, "Off the CrosseBar" podcast
2024	Adam Levi	Inside Lacrosse, NLLPA, and NLL.com, "Lacrosse Matrix" podcast	1	Teddy Jenner, TSN, "Off the CrosseBar" podcast Graeme Perrow, NLL Chatter
2023	Teddy Jenner	TSN	2	Pat Gregoire, Halifax Thunderbirds; Adam Levi, Inside Lacrosse, NLLPA, and NLL.com
2022	Pat Gregoire	Halifax Thunderbirds	1	Jake Elliott, Vancouver Warriors; Tyson Geick, Halifax Thunderbirds / Lacrosse Flash
2021	Season cancelled			
2020	Craig Rybczynski	Rochester Knighthawks	1	Jake Elliott; Teddy Jenner
2019	Tyson Geick	Lacrosse Flash	1	Bob Chavez; Barstool Jordie
2018	Stephen Stamp	ILIndoor.com	2	Jake Elliott; Teddy Jenner
2017	Jake Elliott	TSN 1410, Vancouver	2	
2016	Teddy Jenner	ILIndoor.com	1	
2015	Steve Ewen	The Province	1	
2014	Bob Chavez	ILIndoor.com	1	
2013	Stephen Stamp	ILIndoor.com	1	
2012	Jake Elliott	Minnesota Swarm	1	
2011	Budd Bailey	The Buffalo News	1	
2010	Paul Tutka	NLLInsider.com	3	
2009	Paul Tutka	NLLInsider.com	2	
2008	Paul Tutka	NLLInsider.com	1	
2007	Ty Pilson	Calgary Sun	1	
2006	Sal Maiorana	Rochester Democrat and Chronicle	1	
2005	Mike Koreen	Toronto Sun	1	
