= Nedrow, New York =

Nedrow, New York Onondaga: Dyodeñ·wá·deʼ
- Census-designated place
- Location in Onondaga County and the state of New York.
- Coordinates: 42°58′40″N 76°8′38″W
- Country: United States
- State: New York
- County: Onondaga

Area
  - Total: 0.96 sq mi (2.49 km^{2})
  - Land: 0.96 sq mi (2.49 km^{2})
  - Water: 0 sq mi (0.00 km^{2})
- Elevation: 472 ft (144 m)

Population (2020)
  - Total: 2,095
  - Density: 2,178.1/sq mi (840.98/km^{2})
- Time zone: UTC-5 (Eastern (EST))
  - Summer (DST): UTC-4 (EDT)
- ZIP code: 13120
- Area code: 315
- FIPS code: 49726
- GNIS feature ID: 0958323

Nedrow (/ˈnɛdroʊ/, Onondaga: Dyodeñ·wá·deʼ) is a hamlet (and census-designated place) located in the town of Onondaga in Onondaga County, New York, United States. As of the 2020 census, Nedrow had a population of 2,095. It is a suburb of Syracuse, whose southern border it adjoins.

The name "Nedrow" is an anadrome of founder's name Worden. It is known as Dyodeñ·wá·deʼ in the indigenous Onondaga language.

== Geography ==
Nedrow is located at 42°58′40″N 76°8′38″W (42.977666, -76.143764), on U.S. Route 11, south of Syracuse. Interstate 81 passes through the community.

According to the United States Census Bureau, Nedrow has a total area of 1.0 square mile (2.6 km^{2}), all land.

== Demographics ==
Historical population
Census	Pop.	Note	%±
2020	2,095		—
U.S. Decennial Census

=== 2020 census ===
As of the 2020 census, Nedrow had a population of 2,095. The median age was 41.3 years. 22.2% of residents were under the age of 18 and 17.0% of residents were 65 years of age or older. For every 100 females there were 93.1 males, and for every 100 females age 18 and over there were 92.7 males age 18 and over.

99.3% of residents lived in urban areas, while 0.7% lived in rural areas.

There were 859 households in Nedrow, of which 27.7% had children under the age of 18 living in them. Of all households, 37.4% were married-couple households, 20.0% were households with a male householder and no spouse or partner present, and 33.5% were households with a female householder and no spouse or partner present. About 33.4% of all households were made up of individuals and 12.7% had someone living alone who was 65 years of age or older.

There were 898 housing units, of which 4.3% were vacant. The homeowner vacancy rate was 0.8% and the rental vacancy rate was 4.3%.

Racial composition as of the 2020 census
Race	Number	Percent
White	1,462	69.8%
Black or African American	251	12.0%
American Indian and Alaska Native	98	4.7%
Asian	20	1.0%
Native Hawaiian and Other Pacific Islander	0	0.0%
Some other race	33	1.6%
Two or more races	231	11.0%
Hispanic or Latino (of any race)	99	4.7%

=== 2000 census ===
As of the 2000 census, there were 2,265 people, 868 households, and 604 families residing in the community. The population density was 2,323.0 inhabitants per square mile (896.9/km^{2}). There were 916 housing units at an average density of 939.4 per square mile (362.7/km^{2}). The racial makeup of the CDP was 83.49% White, 7.06% African American, 5.96% Native American, 0.22% Asian, 0.26% from other races, and 3.00% from two or more races. Hispanic or Latino of any race were 1.50% of the population.

There were 868 households, out of which 33.1% had children under the age of 18 living with them, 49.2% were married couples living together, 15.2% had a female householder with no husband present, and 30.4% were non-families. 24.9% of all households were made up of individuals, and 12.6% had someone living alone who was 65 years of age or older. The average household size was 2.61 and the average family size was 3.10.

In the CDP, the population was spread out, with 27.5% under the age of 18, 5.7% from 18 to 24, 29.3% from 25 to 44, 22.0% from 45 to 64, and 15.5% who were 65 years of age or older. The median age was 38 years. For every 100 females, there were 93.8 males. For every 100 females age 18 and over, there were 85.0 males.

The median income for a household in the CDP was $39,423, and the median income for a family was $43,491. Males had a median income of $31,518 versus $21,523 for females. The per capita income for the CDP was $19,470. About 1.7% of families and 4.2% of the population were below the poverty line, including 0.9% of those under age 18 and 10.5% of those age 65 or over.

== Education ==
Most of the census-designated place is in the Onondaga Central School District. A portion is in the LaFayette Central School District.

== Notable people ==
- Jerome Thompson (b. 1988), professional box lacrosse player
- Lyle Thompson (b. 1992), professional lacrosse player
- Miles Thompson (b. 1990), professional lacrosse player
- Mike Hart (b. 1986), professional football NFL player
- Latavius Murray (b. 1990), professional football NFL player
